= Malaysian National Badminton Championships =

The Malaysian National Badminton Championships is a tournament organized by the Badminton Association of Malaysia to crown the best badminton players in Malaysia. The tournament started in the 1980s and is held annually.

== Locations ==
The table below gives an overview of all host cities of the Malaysian National Badminton Championships.

Year	Date	Venue	Ref
Proton-EON National Circuit Grand Prix Finals
1999	17–20 February 2000	Negeri Sembilan Chinese Recreation Hall, Seremban, Negeri Sembilan	
2000	7–10 February 2001	Dewan Persatuan Badminton Perlis, Perlis	
2001	24–27 January 2002	Juara Stadium, Mont Kiara, Kuala Lumpur	
2002	23–26 January 2003	Dewan Persatuan Badminton Selangor, Kuala Lumpur	
2003	8–11 January 2004	Negeri Sembilan Chinese Recreation Hall, Seremban, Negeri Sembilan	
2004	21–24 December 2004	Indera Mulia Stadium, Ipoh, Perak	
Proton National Circuit Grand Prix Finals
2005	12–15 December 2005	Likas Stadium, Kota Kinabalu, Sabah	
2006	8–11 February 2007	State Stadium, Kuala Terengganu, Terengganu	
2007	25–29 March 2008	KBA Badminton Hall, Alor Setar, Kedah	
2008	9–12 December 2008	KBA Badminton Hall, Alor Setar, Kedah	
2009	4–7 February 2010	Johor Bahru Indoor Stadium, Johor Bahru, Johor	
2010	18–21 February 2011	State Stadium, Kuala Terengganu, Terengganu	
2011	12–15 October 2011	Juara Stadium, Mont Kiara, Kuala Lumpur	
Maybank National Circuit Grand Prix Finals
2012	27–30 December 2012	KBA Badminton Hall, Alor Setar, Kedah	
2013	27–30 December 2013	Dewan Serbaguna, Kompleks Kejiranan Precinct 11, Putrajaya	
2014	27–30 December 2014	State Stadium, Kuala Terengganu, Terengganu	
2015	17–20 December 2015	Juara Stadium, Mont Kiara, Kuala Lumpur	
Celcom Axiata National Circuit Grand Prix Finals
2016	8–11 December 2016	Juara Stadium, Mont Kiara, Kuala Lumpur	
Celcom Axiata National Championships
2017	19–25 February 2017	Dewan Sri Perdana, Ulu Kinta, Perak	
2018	26 February–3 March 2018	Juara Stadium, Mont Kiara, Kuala Lumpur	
2019	18–23 February 2019	Arena Badminton Perak, Ipoh, Perak	
PETRONAS National Championships
2023	4–9 July 2023	Stadium Juara, Bukit Kiara, Kuala Lumpur	

== Past winners ==
Year	Men's singles	Women's singles	Men's doubles	Women's doubles	Mixed doubles
1997	Yong Hock Kin	no competition			
1998	Wong Choong Hann	no competition			
1999	Wong Choong Hann	no competition	Choong Tan Fook; Lee Wan Wah	no competition	
2000	Roslin Hashim	Lee Yin Yin	Choong Tan Fook; Lee Wan Wah	Norashikin Amin; Fong Chew Yen	Rosman Razak; Norashikin Amin
2001	James Chua	Lee Yin Yin	Chang Kim Wai; Hong Chieng Hun	Lim Pek Siah; Ang Li Peng	Chan Chong Ming; Lim Pek Siah
2002	Lee Chong Wei	Wong Mew Choo	Chan Chong Ming; Chew Choon Eng	Chin Eei Hui; Wong Pei Tty	Chew Choon Eng; Chin Eei Hui
2003	Lee Chong Wei	Wong Mew Choo	Koo Kien Keat; Gan Teik Chai	Chin Eei Hui; Wong Pei Tty	Mohd Zakry Latif; Joanne Quay Swee Ling
2004	Lee Chong Wei	Anita Raj Kaur	Chan Chong Ming; Koo Kien Keat	Chin Eei Hui; Wong Pei Tty	Gan Teik Chai; Fong Chew Yen
2005	Lee Chong Wei	Julia Wong Pei Xian	Lin Woon Fui; Mohd Fairuzizuan Mohd Tazari	Ooi Sock Ai; Mooi Hing Yau	Koo Kien Keat; Wong Pei Tty
2006	Lee Chong Wei	Wong Mew Choo	Koo Kien Keat; Tan Boon Heong	Julia Wong Pei Xian; Haw Chiou Hwee	Koo Kien Keat; Wong Pei Tty
2007	Lee Chong Wei	Julia Wong Pei Xian	Koo Kien Keat; Tan Boon Heong	Fong Chew Yen; Mooi Hing Yau	Mohd Razif Latif; Chong Sook Chin
2008	Lee Chong Wei	Julia Wong Pei Xian	Chan Peng Soon; Lim Khim Wah	Goh Liu Ying; Ng Hui Lin	Koo Kien Keat; Ng Hui Lin
2009	Lee Chong Wei	Tee Jing Yi	Choong Tan Fook; Lee Wan Wah	Chin Eei Hui; Wong Pei Tty	Mohd Fairuzizuan Mohd Tazari; Wong Pei Tty
2010	Lee Chong Wei	Tee Jing Yi	Hoon Thien How; Tan Boon Heong	Marylen Ng; Woon Khe Wei	Tan Boon Heong; Chin Eei Hui
2011	Lee Chong Wei	Lyddia Cheah Li Ya	Mohd Fairuzizuan Mohd Tazari; Ong Soon Hock	Vivian Hoo Kah Mun; Woon Khe Wei	Chan Peng Soon; Goh Liu Ying
2012	Misbun Ramdan Misbun	Tee Jing Yi	Hoon Thien How; Tan Wee Kiong	Amelia Alicia Anscelly; Soong Fie Cho	Goh V Shem; Soong Fie Cho
2013	Chong Wei Feng	Yang Li Lian	Hoon Thien How; Tan Wee Kiong	Chow Mei Kuan; Vivian Hoo Kah Mun	Chan Peng Soon; Lai Pei Jing
2014	Zulfadli Zulkiffli	Yang Li Lian	Mak Hee Chun; Tan Bin Shen	Amelia Alicia Anscelly; Soong Fie Cho	Mohd Lutfi Zaim Abdul Khalid; Soong Fie Cho
2015	Iskandar Zulkarnain Zainuddin	Tee Jing Yi	Mohamad Arif Abdul Latif; Nur Mohd Azriyn Ayub	Chin Kah Mun; Chow Mei Kuan	Tan Aik Quan; Lai Pei Jing
2016	Lim Chi Wing	Goh Jin Wei	Ong Yew Sin; Teo Ee Yi	Chow Mei Kuan; Lee Meng Yean	Tan Kian Meng; Lai Pei Jing
2017	Lim Chi Wing	Thinaah Muralitharan	Ong Yew Sin; Tan Wee Kiong	Vivian Hoo Kah Mun; Woon Khe Wei	Goh Soon Huat; Shevon Jemie Lai
2018	Iskandar Zulkarnain Zainuddin	Soniia Cheah Su Ya	Goh V Shem; Tan Wee Kiong	Goh Yea Ching; Soong Fie Cho	Goh Soon Huat; Shevon Jemie Lai
2019	Soong Joo Ven	Soniia Cheah Su Ya	Ong Yew Sin; Teo Ee Yi	Anna Cheong; Lim Chiew Sien	Chan Peng Soon; Goh Liu Ying
2023	Leong Jun Hao	Letshanaa Karupathevan	Junaidi Arif; Yap Roy King	Vivian Hoo; Lim Chiew Sien	Yap Roy King; Valeree Siow

== Successful players ==
Below is the list of the most ever successful players in the Malaysian National Badminton Championships:

Players	MS	WS	MD	WD	XD	Total
Lee Chong Wei	10					10
Koo Kien Keat			4		3	7
Wong Pei Tty				4	3	7
Chin Eei Hui				4	2	6
Soong Fie Cho				3	2	5
Julia Wong Pei Xian		3		1		4
Tan Boon Heong			3		1	4
Tee Jing Yi		4				4
Tan Wee Kiong			4			4
Chan Peng Soon			1		3	4
Vivian Hoo Kah Mun				4		4
