= Khunakorn Sudhisodhi =

Thai badminton player

Personal information
- Born: 29 March 1974 (age 52)
- Height: 1.74 m (5 ft 9 in)
- Weight: 59 kg (130 lb)

Sport
- Country: Thailand
- Sport: Badminton
- Handedness: Right
- Event: Men's & mixed doubles

Men's & mixed doubles
- BWF profile
Medal record
Men's badminton
Representing Thailand
Asian Games
Silver medal – second place	2002 Busan	Mixed doubles
Asian Championships
Silver medal – second place	2002 Bangkok	Mixed doubles
Southeast Asian Games
Bronze medal – third place	1995 Chiang Mai	Mixed doubles
Bronze medal – third place	1999 Bandar Seri Begawan	Men's doubles
Bronze medal – third place	1999 Bandar Seri Begawan	Mixed doubles
Bronze medal – third place	2001 Kuala Lumpur	Mixed doubles
Bronze medal – third place	1993 Singapore	Men's team
Bronze medal – third place	1995 Chiang Mai	Men's team
Bronze medal – third place	1997 Jakarta	Men's team
Bronze medal – third place	1999 Bandar Seri Begawan	Men's team
Bronze medal – third place	2001 Kuala Lumpur	Men's team

Khunakorn Sudhisodhi (Thai: คุณากร สุทธิโสตถิ์; born on 29 March 1974) is a Thai badminton player. He competed at the 1996 and 2000 Summer Olympics. He won the men's doubles title at the National Championships in 1996, 1998 and 2000; and in the mixed doubles event he clinched six times National title consecutively from 1997-2002. Sudhisodhi was the silver medalists at the 2002 Asian Games and Asian Championships in the mixed doubles event partnered with Saralee Thungthongkam.

== Achievements ==
=== Asian Games ===
Mixed doubles
Year	Venue	Partner	Opponent	Score	Result
2002	Gangseo Gymnasium; Busan, South Korea	(Thailand) Saralee Thungthongkam	(South Korea) Kim Dong-moon (South Korea) Ra Kyung-min	4–11, 0–11	Silver

=== Asian Championships ===
Mixed doubles
Year	Venue	Partner	Opponent	Score	Result
2002	Bangkok, Thailand	(Thailand) Saralee Thungthongkam	(China) Zhang Jun (China) Gao Ling	7–11, 8–11	Silver

=== Southeast Asian Games ===
Men's doubles
Year	Venue	Partner	Opponent	Score	Result
1999	Hassanal Bolkiah Sports Complex; Bandar Seri Begawan, Brunei	(Thailand) Kitipon Kitikul	(Indonesia) Flandy Limpele (Indonesia) Eng Hian	3–15, 7–15	Bronze

Mixed doubles
Year	Venue	Partner	Opponent	Score	Result
2001	Malawati Stadium; Selangor, Malaysia	(Thailand) Saralee Thungthongkam	(Indonesia) Bambang Suprianto (Indonesia) Emma Ermawati	11–15, 3–15	Bronze
1999	Hassanal Bolkiah Sports Complex; Bandar Seri Begawan, Brunei	(Thailand) Saralee Thungthongkam	(Malaysia) Rosman Razak (Malaysia) Norashikin Amin	16–17, 12–15	Bronze
1995	700th Anniversary Stadium; Chiang Mai, Thailand	(Thailand) Sujitra Ekmongkolpaisarn	(Indonesia) Denny Kantono (Indonesia) Eliza Nathanael	8–15, 6–15	Bronze

=== IBF World Grand Prix ===
The World Badminton Grand Prix sanctioned by International Badminton Federation (IBF) since 1983.

Men's doubles
Year	Tournament	Partner	Opponent	Score	Result
2000	Swedish Open	(Thailand) Kitipon Kitikul	(Denmark) Michael Lamp (Denmark) Jonas Rasmussen	15–8, 15–11	(gold) Winner

Mixed doubles
Year	Tournament	Partner	Opponent	Score	Result
2001	Hong Kong Open	(Thailand) Saralee Thungthongkam	(South Korea) Kim Dong-moon (South Korea) Ra Kyung-min	7–3, 0–7, 2–7, 2–7	(silver) Runner-up

=== IBF International ===
Men's doubles
Year	Tournament	Partner	Opponent	Score	Result
2002	Macau Satellite	(Thailand) Patapol Ngernsrisuk	(Japan) Shuichi Nakao (Japan) Shuichi Sakamoto	5–15, 15–2, 15–6	(gold) Winner
2001	Smiling Fish Satellite	(Thailand) Patapol Ngernsrisuk	(Thailand) Kitipon Kitikul (Thailand) Sudket Prapakamol	15–9, 15–7	(gold) Winner
