= Rony Agustinus =

Indonesian badminton player and coach

Personal information
- Born: 7 October 1978 (age 48)
- Height: 1.80 m (5 ft 11 in)

Sport
- Country: Indonesia
- Sport: Badminton
- Handedness: Right
- Event: Men's singles & doubles

Men's singles & doubles
- BWF profile
Medal record
Men's badminton
Representing Indonesia
Thomas Cup
Gold medal – first place	2002 Guangzhou	Men's team
Asian Games
Silver medal – second place	2002 Busan	Men's team
Asian Championships
Silver medal – second place	2000 Jakarta	Men's singles
Southeast Asian Games
Gold medal – first place	1999 Bandar Seri Begawan	Men's team
Silver medal – second place	2001 Kuala Lumpur	Men's team
Bronze medal – third place	1999 Bandar Seri Begawan	Men's singles
Bronze medal – third place	2001 Kuala Lumpur	Men's singles
World Junior Championships
Bronze medal – third place	1996 Silkeborg	Boys' singles

Rony Agustinus (born 7 October 1978) is an Indonesian former badminton player, who now works as a badminton coach. As a junior player, he represented his country at the 1996 World Junior Championships and won the bronze medal in the boys' singles event. In 1997, he finished as a semi-finalist at the French and Indonesia International tournaments. He took the silver medal at the 2000 Asian Championships but was defeated by his teammate Taufik Hidayat in the final. In 2001, he reached the final of the 2001 Malaysia Open as an unseeded player, defeating a former All England champion Pullela Gopichand of India, his compatriot Hendrawan, the world champion, Park Tae-sang of South Korea, and Chen Hong of China en route to the final. He failed to win the title after he lost to host player Ong Ewe Hock. Agustinus played at the 2002 Busan Asian Games, and helped the team win the silver medal. He was also part of the national team that won the 2002 Thomas Cup.

Agustinus started his career as a coach in Indonesia, and was Malaysia national coach from 2013 to 2019. Currently he is a coach for South Korea national men's and women's single team.

== Achievements ==
=== Asian Championships ===
Men's singles
Year	Venue	Opponent	Score	Result
2000	Istora Senayan; Jakarta, Indonesia	(Indonesia) Taufik Hidayat	17–14, 2–15, 3–15	Silver

=== Southeast Asian Games ===
Men's singles
Year	Venue	Opponent	Score	Result
1999	Hassanal Bolkiah Sports Complex; Bandar Seri Begawan, Brunei	(Malaysia) Wong Choong Hann	15–17, 2–15	Bronze
2001	Malawati Stadium; Selangor, Malaysia	(Thailand) Boonsak Ponsana	6–15, 1–15	Bronze

=== World Junior Championships ===
Boys' singles
Year	Venue	Opponent	Score	Result
1996	Silkeborg Hallerne; Silkeborg, Denmark	(China) Zhu Feng	11–15, 7–15	Bronze

=== IBF Grand Prix ===
The World Badminton Grand Prix was sanctioned by the International Badminton Federation from 1983 to 2006.

Men's singles
Year	Tournament	Opponent	Score	Result
2001	Malaysia Open	(Malaysia) Ong Ewe Hock	7–3, 2–7, 0–7, 8–6, 1–7	(silver) Runner-up
