= Sujitra Ekmongkolpaisarn =

Thai badminton player

Personal information
- Born: 17 June 1977 (age 49) Bangkok, Thailand
- Height: 1.74 m (5 ft 9 in)
- Weight: 61 kg (134 lb)

Sport
- Country: Thailand
- Sport: Badminton
- Handedness: Right
- Event: Women's singles & doubles

Women's singles & doubles
- BWF profile
Medal record
Women's badminton
Representing Thailand
Asian Games
Bronze medal – third place	2002 Busan	Women's team
Bronze medal – third place	1998 Bangkok	Women's singles
Asian Championships
Bronze medal – third place	1999 Kuala Lumpur	Women's doubles
Southeast Asian Games
Gold medal – first place	2005 Manila	Women's team
Gold medal – first place	2001 Kuala Lumpur	Women's singles
Silver medal – second place	2001 Kuala Lumpur	Women's team
Silver medal – second place	1999 Bandar Seri Begawan	Women's singles
Silver medal – second place	1999 Bandar Seri Begawan	Women's team
Silver medal – second place	1995 Chiang Mai	Women's team
Bronze medal – third place	1999 Bandar Seri Begawan	Women's doubles
Bronze medal – third place	1995 Chiang Mai	Mixed doubles

Sujitra Ekmongkolpaisarn (Thai: สุจิตรา เอกมงคลไพศาล; born 17 June 1977) is a former Thai badminton player. She competed at the 2000 Summer Olympics in Sydney, Australia in the women's singles and doubles event. Ekmongkolpaisarn was the bronze medalists at the 1998 Asian Games in the women's team event, 2002 Asian Games in the singles event, and at the 1999 Asian Championships in the doubles event. She reached a career high ranking of World No. 5.

In 2017, Ekmongkolpaisarn announced about her marriage plan with a woman Viraradis Tippadabhorn, which she had dating for three and a half years.

== Achievements ==
=== Asian Games ===
Women's singles
Year	Venue	Opponent	Score	Result
1998	Thammasat Gymnasium 2 Bangkok, Thailand	(Japan) Kanako Yonekura	5–11, 2–11	Bronze

=== Asian Championships ===
Women's doubles
Year	Venue	Partner	Opponent	Score	Result
1999	Kuala Lumpur, Malaysia	(Thailand) Saralee Thungthongkam	(South Korea) Ra Kyung-min (South Korea) Chung Jae-hee	1–15, 8–15	Bronze

=== Southeast Asian Games ===
Women's singles
Year	Venue	Opponent	Score	Result
2001	Malawati Stadium; Selangor, Malaysia	(Indonesia) Lidya Djaelawijaya	11–8, 11–7	Gold
1999	Hassanal Bolkiah Sports Complex; Bandar Seri Begawan, Brunei	(Indonesia) Cindana Hartono Kusuma	5–11, 2–11	Silver

Women's doubles
Year	Venue	Partner	Opponent	Score	Result
1999	Hassanal Bolkiah Sports Complex; Bandar Seri Begawan, Brunei	(Thailand) Saralee Thungthongkam	(Indonesia) Indarti Isolina (Indonesia) Emma Ermawati	10–15, 11–15	Bronze

Mixed doubles
Year	Venue	Partner	Opponent	Score	Result
1995	700th Anniversary Stadium; Chiang Mai, Thailand	(Thailand) Khunakorn Sudhisodhi	(Indonesia) Denny Kantono (Indonesia) Eliza Nathanael	8–15, 6–15	Bronze

=== IBF World Grand Prix ===
The World Badminton Grand Prix sanctioned by International Badminton Federation (IBF) since 1983.

Women's singles
Year	Tournament	Opponent	Score	Result
2002	Chinese Taipei Open	(Hong Kong) Wang Chen	3–11, 1–11	(silver) Runner-up
2001	Hong Kong Open	(South Korea) Jun Jae-youn	7–4, 8–6, 7–0	(gold) Winner
2000	Swedish Open	(Japan) Kanako Yonekura	9–11, 13–10, 10–13	(silver) Runner-up
2000	Chinese Taipei Open	(Netherlands) Mia Audina	11–13, 2–11	(silver) Runner-up
1992	Brunei Open	(Indonesia) Meiluawati	0–11, 7–11	(silver) Runner-up

Women's doubles
Year	Tournament	Partner	Opponent	Score	Result
2002	Indonesia Open	(Thailand) Saralee Thungthongkam	(China) Gao Ling (China) Huang Sui	5–11, 4–11	(silver) Runner-up

=== IBF International ===
Women's singles
Year	Tournament	Opponent	Score	Result
2005	Sri Lanka Satellite	(Thailand) Molthila Meemeak	11–7, 11–2	(gold) Winner
2005	Vietnam Satellite	(Malaysia) Julia Wong Pei Xian	11–1, 11–4	(gold) Winner

Women's doubles
Year	Tournament	Partner	Opponent	Score	Result
2001	Smiling Fish Satellite	(Thailand) Sathinee Chankrachangwong	(Thailand) Duanganong Aroonkesorn (Thailand) Kunchala Voravichitchaikul	13–15, 15–5, 15–9	(gold) Winner

Mixed doubles
Year	Tournament	Partner	Opponent	Score	Result
2001	Smiling Fish Satellite	(Thailand) Sudket Prapakamol	(Malaysia) Ng Kean Kok (Malaysia) Fong Chen Yen	15–6, 15–8	(gold) Winner
