= Lidya Djaelawijaya =

Indonesian badminton player

Personal information
- Born: 15 October 1974 (age 52) Tasikmalaya, West Java, Indonesia
- Height: 1.64 m (5 ft 5 in)
- Weight: 55 kg (121 lb)

Sport
- Country: Indonesia
- Sport: Badminton
- Handedness: Right
- Event: Women's singles

Women's singles
- BWF profile
Medal record
Women's badminton
Representing Indonesia
Sudirman Cup
Silver medal – second place	2001 Seville	Mixed team
Bronze medal – third place	1999 Copenhagen	Mixed team
Uber Cup
Gold medal – first place	1996 Hong Kong	Women's team
Bronze medal – third place	2000 Kuala Lumpur	Women's team
Asian Championships
Bronze medal – third place	1997 Kuala Lumpur	Women's singles
Asian Cup
Bronze medal – third place	1996 Seoul	Women's singles
Southeast Asian Games
Gold medal – first place	1995 Chiang Mai	Women's team
Gold medal – first place	1999 Bandar Seri Begawan	Women's team
Gold medal – first place	2001 Kuala Lumpur	Women's team
Silver medal – second place	2001 Kuala Lumpur	Women's singles
Bronze medal – third place	1995 Chiang Mai	Women's singles
Bronze medal – third place	1999 Bandar Seri Begawan	Women's singles

Lidya Djaelawijaya (born 15 October 1974) is a former Indonesian badminton player, who play in the singles event. She won the Russian Open in 1995, and Indonesia Open in 1999. Djaelawijaya was part of the Indonesia women's team that won the 1996 Uber Cup. The team also reach in to the semi-finals in 2000, clinched the bronze medal. Djaelawijaya competed at the 2000 Summer Olympics in Sydney, Australia, finished in the third round.

== Achievements ==
=== Asian Championships ===
Women's singles
Year	Venue	Opponent	Score	Result
1997	Stadium Negara; Kuala Lumpur, Malaysia	(China) Yu Hua	7–11, 11–2, 8–11	Bronze

=== Asian Cup ===
Women's singles
Year	Venue	Opponent	Score	Result
1996	Olympic Gymnasium No. 2 Seoul, South Korea	(China) Zeng Yaqiong	4–11, 0–11	Bronze

=== Southeast Asian Games ===
Women's singles
Year	Venue	Opponent	Score	Result
1995	700th Anniversary Stadium; Chiang Mai, Thailand	(Thailand) Somharuthai Jaroensiri	11–12, 10–12	Bronze
1999	Hassanal Bolkiah Sports Complex; Bandar Seri Begawan, Brunei	(Thailand) Sujitra Ekmongkolpaisarn	9–11, 13–10, 9–11	Bronze
2001	Malawati Stadium; Selangor, Malaysia	(Thailand) Sujitra Ekmongkolpaisarn	8–11, 7–11	Silver

=== IBF World Grand Prix (2 titles, 1 runner-up) ===
The World Badminton Grand Prix has been sanctioned by the International Badminton Federation from 1983 to 2006.

Women's singles
Year	Tournament	Opponent	Score	Result
1995	Russian Open	(Russia) Elena Rybkina	11–4, 11–3	(gold) Winner
1998	Hong Kong Open	(Denmark) Camilla Martin	3–11, 0–11	(silver) Runner-up
1999	Indonesia Open	(Indonesia) Ellen Angelina	11–8, 9–11, 11–2	(gold) Winner

IBF Grand Prix tournament
IBF Grand Prix Finals tournament
