= Badminton at the 2001 SEA Games =

- Venue: Malawati Stadium, Selangor
- Dates: 9–15 September 2001

A badminton tournament was held at the 2001 SEA Games in Malawati Stadium, Selangor, Malaysia from 9 to 15 September 2001.

== Medalists ==
Event	Gold	Silver	Bronze
Men's singles	Roslin Hashim; Malaysia	Boonsak Ponsana; Thailand	Marleve Mainaky; Indonesia
Men's singles	Roslin Hashim; Malaysia	Boonsak Ponsana; Thailand	Rony Agustinus; Indonesia
Women's singles	Sujitra Ekmongkolpaisarn; Thailand	Lidya Djaelawijaya; Indonesia	Wong Miew Kheng; Malaysia
Women's singles	Sujitra Ekmongkolpaisarn; Thailand	Lidya Djaelawijaya; Indonesia	Ng Mee Fen; Malaysia
Men's doubles	Indonesia; Sigit Budiarto; Candra Wijaya	Indonesia; Tony Gunawan; Bambang Suprianto	Malaysia; Chan Chong Ming; Chew Choon Eng
Men's doubles	Indonesia; Sigit Budiarto; Candra Wijaya	Indonesia; Tony Gunawan; Bambang Suprianto	Malaysia; Lee Wan Wah; Wong Choong Hann
Women's doubles	Indonesia; Deyana Lomban; Vita Marissa	Malaysia; Ang Li Peng; Lim Pek Siah	Malaysia; Norhasikin Amin; Wong Pei Tty
Women's doubles	Indonesia; Deyana Lomban; Vita Marissa	Malaysia; Ang Li Peng; Lim Pek Siah	Thailand; Duanganong Aroonkesorn; Kunchala Voravichitchaikul
Mixed doubles	Indonesia; Nova Widianto; Vita Marissa	Indonesia; Bambang Suprianto; Emma Ermawati	Malaysia; Chew Choon Eng; Wong Pei Tty
Mixed doubles	Indonesia; Nova Widianto; Vita Marissa	Indonesia; Bambang Suprianto; Emma Ermawati	Thailand; Khunakorn Sudhisodhi; Saralee Thungthongkam
Men's team	Malaysia; Roslin Hashim; Ong Ewe Hock; Wong Choong Hann; Choong Tan Fook; Lee Wan Wah; Chew Choon Eng; Chan Chong Ming	Indonesia; Hendrawan; Marleve Mainaky; Rony Agustinus; Candra Wijaya; Sigit Budiarto; Tony Gunawan; Bambang Suprianto; Nova Widianto	Thailand; Boonsak Ponsana; Anuphap Theeraratsakul; Sudket Prapakamol; Patapol Ngernsrisuk; Tesana Panvisvas; Pramote Teerawiwatana; Jakrapan Thanathiratham; Khunakorn Sudhisodhi
Men's team	Malaysia; Roslin Hashim; Ong Ewe Hock; Wong Choong Hann; Choong Tan Fook; Lee Wan Wah; Chew Choon Eng; Chan Chong Ming	Indonesia; Hendrawan; Marleve Mainaky; Rony Agustinus; Candra Wijaya; Sigit Budiarto; Tony Gunawan; Bambang Suprianto; Nova Widianto	Singapore; Gerald Ho; Noor Izwan Paini; Kenny Quek; Mohd Malik Masri; Patrick Lau; Jack Hee; Chua Yong Joo; Khoo Kian Teck
Women's team	Indonesia; Lidya Djaelawijaya; Yuli Marfuah; Cindana Hartono Kusuma; Deyana Lomban; Vita Marissa; Emma Ermawati; Enny Erlangga; Jo Novita	Thailand; Sujitra Ekmongkolpaisarn; Salakjit Ponsana; Nucharintra Teekatakul; Saralee Thungthongkam; Sathinee Chankrachangwong; Duanganong Aroonkesorn; Kunchala Voravichitchaikul	Malaysia; Ng Mee Fen; Wong Miew Kheng; Norhasikin Amin; Wong Pei Tty; Ang Li Peng; Lim Pek Siah; Joanne Quay
Women's team	Indonesia; Lidya Djaelawijaya; Yuli Marfuah; Cindana Hartono Kusuma; Deyana Lomban; Vita Marissa; Emma Ermawati; Enny Erlangga; Jo Novita	Thailand; Sujitra Ekmongkolpaisarn; Salakjit Ponsana; Nucharintra Teekatakul; Saralee Thungthongkam; Sathinee Chankrachangwong; Duanganong Aroonkesorn; Kunchala Voravichitchaikul	Vietnam; Lê Ngọc Nguyên Nhung; Ngô Hải Vân; Nguyễn Hạnh Dung; Hà Thị Kim Nhân

== Results ==
=== Men's team ===
Quarter-final
Thailand (THA)	3
Vietnam (VIE)	0
Myanmar (MYA)	2
Singapore (SIN)	3
Brunei (BRU)	0
Malaysia (MAS)	3

Semi-Final
Indonesia (INA)	3
Thailand (THA)	0
Singapore (SIN)	0
Malaysia (MAS)	3

Final
Indonesia (INA)	2
Malaysia (MAS)	3

==== Quarter-final ====
9 September	Thailand (THA)	3–0	Vietnam (VIE)

Boonsak Ponsana	2–0	Nguyễn Hoàng Long	15-3, 15-1
Anuphap Theeraratsakul	2–0	Nguyễn Phú Cường	15-5, 15-7
Sudket Prapakamol / Patapol Ngernsrisuk	2–1	Trần Thanh Hải / Bùi Quang Sơn	12-15, 15-10, 15-6

9 September	Myanmar (MYA)	2–3	Singapore (SIN)

Lwin Aung	2–0	Gerald Ho	15-11, 17-15
Zaw Win	2–0	Noor Izwan Paini	15-3, 15-9
Zarni Htay	0–2	Kenny Quek	12-15, 14-17
Lwin Aung / Zaw Win	0–2	Patrick Lau / Jack Hee	12-15, 5-15
Zarni Htay / Zaw Maung Maung Soe	0–2	Chua Yong Joo / Khoo Kian Teck	4-15, 6-15

9 September	Brunei (BRU)	0–3	Malaysia (MAS)

Amran Kambar	0–2	Roslin Hashim	2-15, 0-15
Michael Nyau Mee Yinn / Zailani Yuin	0–2	Wong Choong Hann / Lee Wan Wah	3-15, 3-15
Huzaini Md Salleh	0–2	Ong Ewe Hock	2-15, 2-15

==== Semi-final ====
10 September	Indonesia (INA)	3–0	Thailand (THA)

Hendrawan	2–1	Boonsak Ponsana	16-17, 15-12, 15-4
Candra Wijaya / Sigit Budiarto	2–1	Tesana Panvisvas / Pramote Teerawiwatana	15-13, 7-15, 15-5
Marleve Mainaky	2–1	Anuphap Theeraratsakul	15-9, 14-17, 15-9

10 September	Singapore (SIN)	0–3	Malaysia (MAS)

Gerald Ho	0–2	Ong Ewe Hock	9–15, 7–15
Kenny Quek	0–2	Wong Choong Hann	2–15, 7–15
Mohd Malik Masri	0–2	Chan Chong Ming	7–15, 4–15

==== Final ====
11 September	Indonesia (INA)	2–3	Malaysia (MAS)

Hendrawan	2–1	Mohd Roslin Hashim	2-15, 15-13, 15-10
Candra Wijaya / Sigit Budiarto	2–0	Choong Tan Fook / Lee Wan Wah	13-5, ret
Marleve Mainaky	0–2	Ong Ewe Hock	12-15, 9-15
Tony Gunawan / Bambang Suprianto	1–2	Chew Choon Eng / Chan Chong Ming	7-15, 15-10, 9-15
Rony Agustinus	0–2	Wong Choong Hann	1-15, 5-15

=== Women's team ===
Semi-final
Indonesia (INA)	3
Malaysia (MAS)	0
Vietnam (VIE)	0
Thailand (THA)	3

Final
Indonesia (INA)	3
Thailand (THA)	1

==== Semi-final ====
10 September	Indonesia (INA)	3–0	Malaysia (MAS)

Lidya Djaelawijaya	2–0	Ng Mee Fen	11-7, 11-6
Deyana Lomban / Vita Marissa	2–0	Norhasikin Amin / Wong Pei Tty	15-8, 15-8
Yuli Marfuah	2–1	Wong Miew Kheng	11-6, 9-11, 11-5

10 September	Vietnam (VIE)	0–3	Thailand (THA)

Lê Ngọc Nguyên Nhung	0–2	Sujitra Ekmongkolpaisarn	2-11, 1-11
Ngô Hải Vân	0–2	Salakjit Ponsana	0-11, 0-11
Nguyễn Hạnh Dung	0–2	Nucharintra Teekatakul	1-11, 5-11

==== Final ====
11 September	Indonesia (INA)	3–1	Thailand (THA)

Lidya Djaelawijaya	2–0	Sujitra Ekmongkolpaisarn	11-7, 11-2
Deyana Lomban / Vita Marissa	2–0	Sathinee Chankrachangwong / Saralee Thungthongkam	15-10, 15-6
Yuli Marfuah	1–2	Salakjit Ponsana	11-6, 2-11, 8-11
Emma Ermawati / Enny Erlangga	2–0	Duanganong Aroonkesorn / Kunchala Voravichitchaikul	15-7, 15-8

=== Men's singles ===
==== Final ====
Gold-medal match 15 September 14:00
	Boonsak Ponsana (THA)	14	3
3	Roslin Hashim (MAS)	17	15

==== Top half ====
Round of 32; 12 September 09:00

Round of 16; 12 September 15:00
Rony Agustinus (INA)	15	15
Noor Izwan Paini (SIN)	1	8
Zaw Win (MYA)	15	14	15
Amran Kambar (BRU)	13	15	1
4	Ong Ewe Hock (MAS)	11	9
Boonsak Ponsana (THA)	15	15
Nguyễn Quang Minh (VIE)	15	15
Khun Vanna (CAM)	8	1

Quarterfinal; 13 September 20:00
Rony Agustinus (INA)	15	15
Zaw Win (MYA)	4	10
Boonsak Ponsana (THA)	15	15
Nguyễn Quang Minh (VIE)	4	2

Semifinal; 14 September 14:40
Rony Agustinus (INA)	6	1
Boonsak Ponsana (THA)	15	15

==== Bottom half ====
Round of 32; 12 September 09:00
8	Lwin Aung (MYA)	16	15	15
9	Nguyễn Hoàng Long (VIE)	17	5	11

Round of 16; 12 September 15:00
HM Salleh (BRU)	7	7
Lwin Aung (MYA)	15	15
Gerald Ho (SIN)	5	3
3	Roslin Hashim (MAS)	15	15
Kennevic Asuncion (PHI)	15	15
Krang Sokhang (CAM)	0	3
Anuphap Theeraratsakul (THA)	15	6	4
2	Marleve Mainaky (INA)	3	15	15

Quarterfinal; 13 September 20:00
Lwin Aung (MYA)	7	1
3	Roslin Hashim (MAS)	15	15
Kennevic Asuncion (PHI)	1	10
2	Marleve Mainaky (INA)	15	15

Semifinal; 14 September 15:20
3	Roslin Hashim (MAS)	13	15	15
2	Marleve Mainaky (INA)	15	11	7

=== Women's singles ===
Round of 16; 12 September 15:00
4	Kennie Asuncion (PHI)
13	Lê Ngọc Nguyên Nhung (VIE)
3	Fatimah Kumin Lim (SIN)	11	11
14	Ha Thi Kim Nhan (VIE)	3	7

Quarterfinal; 13 September 19:30
Lidya Djaelawijaya (INA)
Salakjit Ponsana (THA)
Wong Miew Kheng (MAS)
Ng Mee Fen (MAS)
Fatimah Kumin Lim (SIN)
Cindana Hartono Kusuma (INA)
Sujitra Ekmongkolpaisarn (THA)

Semifinal; 14 September 14:40
Lidya Djaelawijaya (INA)	11	11
Wong Miew Kheng (MAS)	7	7
Ng Mee Fen (MAS)	7	6
Sujitra Ekmongkolpaisarn (THA)	11	11

Gold-medal match 15 September 14:00
Lidya Djaelawijaya (INA)	8	7
Sujitra Ekmongkolpaisarn (THA)	11	11

=== Men's doubles ===
Round of 16; 12 September 09:00
8	Trần Thanh Hải (VIE); Bùi Quang Sơn (VIE)	w/o
9	Lwin Aung (MYA); Zaw Win (MYA)
5	Pramote Teerawiwatana (THA); Tesana Panvisvas (THA)	15	15
12	Ermadena Hj Talip (BRU); Mohd Fadzli Masri (BRU)	1	1
4	Wong Choong Hann (MAS); Lee Wan Wah (MAS)	15	15
13	Patrick Lau (SIN); Jack Hee (SIN)	2	8
6	Khoo Kian Teck (SIN); Chua Yong Joo (SIN)	8	15	15
11	Khun Vanna (CAM); Krang Sokhang (CAM)	15	6	2
3	Michael Nyau Mee Yinn (BRU); Zailani Yuin (BRU)	5	5
14	Tony Gunawan (INA); Bambang Suprianto (INA)	15	15
7	Nguyễn Phú Cường (VIE); Nguyễn Như Mỹ (VIE)	1	6
10	Patapol Ngernsrisuk (THA); Sudket Prapakamol (THA)	15	15
2	Zarni Htay (MYA); Zaw Maung Maung Soe (MYA)	3	2
15	Chan Chong Ming (MAS); Chew Choon Eng (MAS)	15	15

Quarterfinal; 13 September 21:00
Candra Wijaya (INA); Sigit Budiarto (INA)	15	15
Trần Thanh Hải (VIE); Bùi Quang Sơn (VIE)	5	2
Pramote Teerawiwatana (THA); Tesana Panvisvas (THA)	15	13	10
Wong Choong Hann (MAS); Lee Wan Wah (MAS)	8	15	15
Khoo Kian Teck (SIN); Chua Yong Joo (SIN)	0	3
Tony Gunawan (INA); Bambang Suprianto (INA)	15	15
Patapol Ngernsrisuk (THA); Sudket Prapakamol (THA)	7	6
Chan Chong Ming (MAS); Chew Choon Eng (MAS)	15	15

Semifinal; 14 September 16:00
Candra Wijaya (INA); Sigit Budiarto (INA)	15	15
Wong Choong Hann (MAS); Lee Wan Wah (MAS)	4	5
Tony Gunawan (INA); Bambang Suprianto (INA)	9	15	15
Chan Chong Ming (MAS); Chew Choon Eng (MAS)	15	3	4

Gold-medal match 15 September 14:00
Candra Wijaya (INA); Sigit Budiarto (INA)	15	15
Tony Gunawan (INA); Bambang Suprianto (INA)	4	6

=== Women's doubles ===
Round of 16; 12 September 09:00
3	Fatimah Kumin Lim (SIN); Foo Shui Yen (SIN)	11	10
14	Ngô Hải Vân (VIE); Nguyễn Hạnh Dung (VIE)	15	15

Quarterfinal; 13 September 20:30
Deyana Lomban (INA); Vita Marissa (INA)
Sathinee Chankrachangwong (THA); Saralee Thungthongkam (THA)
Wong Pei Tty (MAS); Norhasikin Amin (MAS)
Hà Thị Kim Nhân (VIE); Lê Ngọc Nguyên Nhung (VIE)
Duanganong Aroonkesorn (THA); Kunchala Voravichitchaikul (THA)
Ngô Hải Vân (VIE); Nguyễn Hạnh Dung (VIE)
Eny Erlangga (INA); Jo Novita (INA)
Lim Pek Siah (MAS); Ang Li Peng (MAS)

Semifinal; 14 September 16:00
Deyana Lomban (INA); Vita Marissa (INA)	15	15	15
Wong Pei Tty (MAS); Norhasikin Amin (MAS)	7	17	5
Duanganong Aroonkesorn (THA); Kunchala Voravichitchaikul (THA)	4	15	6
Lim Pek Siah (MAS); Ang Li Peng (MAS)	15	10	15

Gold-medal match 15 September 14:00
Deyana Lomban (INA); Vita Marissa (INA)	15	4	15
Lim Pek Siah (MAS); Ang Li Peng (MAS)	5	15	9

=== Mixed doubles ===
Round of 16; 12 September 09:00
4	Chew Choon Eng (MAS); Wong Pei Tty (MAS)	15	8	15
13	Jakrapan Thanathiratham (THA); Kunchala Voravichitchaikul (THA)	2	15	5
3	Bambang Suprianto (INA); Emma Ermawati (INA)	15	15
14	Khoo Kian Teck (SIN); Foo Shui Yen (SIN)	9	1

Quarterfinal; 13 September 19:00
Nova Widianto (INA); Vita Marissa (INA)	15	15
Kennevic Asuncion (PHI); Kennie Asuncion (PHI)	11	3
Bùi Quang Sơn (VIE); Nguyễn Hạnh Dung (VIE)	4	11
Chew Choon Eng (MAS); Wong Pei Tty (MAS)	15	15
Nguyễn Phú Cường (VIE); Ngô Hải Vân (VIE)	5	6
Bambang Suprianto (INA); Emma Ermawati (INA)	15	15
Chan Chong Ming (MAS); Joanne Quay (MAS)	15	4	13
Khunakorn Sudhisodhi (THA); Saralee Thungthongkam (THA)	11	15	15

Semifinal; 14 September 14:00
Nova Widianto (INA); Vita Marissa (INA)	15	15
Chew Choon Eng (MAS); Wong Pei Tty (MAS)	2	8
Bambang Suprianto (INA); Emma Ermawati (INA)	15	15
Khunakorn Sudhisodhi (THA); Saralee Thungthongkam (THA)	11	3

Gold-medal match 15 September 14:00
Nova Widianto (INA); Vita Marissa (INA)	3	15	17
Bambang Suprianto (INA); Emma Ermawati (INA)	15	7	15

== Medal tally ==
Legend

* Host nation (Malaysia)

Rank	Nation	Gold	Silver	Bronze	Total
1	Indonesia (INA)	4	4	2	10
2	Malaysia (MAS)*	2	1	7	10
3	Thailand (THA)	1	2	3	6
4	Singapore (SIN)	0	0	1	1
4	Vietnam (VIE)	0	0	1	1
Totals (5 entries)		7	7	14	28
