= Badminton at the 1997 SEA Games =

Badminton at the 1997 Asian Games
- Venue: Asia-Africa hall, Senayan sports complex
- Dates: October 12–18, 1997
- Nations: 7

A badminton tournament was held at the 1997 SEA Games in Asia-Africa hall at the Senayan sports complex, Jakarta from 12 to 18 October 1997. Both men and women competed in their own team, singles, and doubles events and together they competed in a mixed doubles event. There was also a playoff between the two semifinal losers to determine the sole winner of the bronze medal.

== Medalists ==
Event	Gold	Silver	Bronze
Men's singles	(Indonesia) Heryanto Arbi	(Malaysia) Ong Ewe Hock	(Indonesia) Joko Suprianto
Women's singles	(Indonesia) Mia Audina	(Indonesia) Meiluawati	(Thailand) Pornsawan Plungwech
Men's doubles	(Indonesia) Candra Wijaya (Indonesia) Sigit Budiarto	(Indonesia) Ricky Subagja (Indonesia) Rexy Mainaky	(Thailand) Siripong Siripol (Thailand) Pramote Teerawiwatana
Women's doubles	(Indonesia) Eliza Nathanael (Indonesia) Zelin Resiana	(Indonesia) Indarti Issolina (Indonesia) Deyana Lomban	(Philippines) Amparo Lim (Philippines) Kennie Asuncion
Mixed doubles	(Indonesia) Candra Wijaya (Indonesia) Eliza Nathanael	(Indonesia) Tri Kusharjanto (Indonesia) Minarti Timur	(Malaysia) Chew Choon Eng (Malaysia) Ang Li Peng
Men's team	Indonesia; Heryanto Arbi; Sigit Budiarto; Tri Kusharjanto; Rexy Mainaky; Ricky Subagja; Joko Suprianto; Candra Wijaya; Indra Wijaya	Malaysia; Cheah Soon Kit; Chew Choon Eng; Lee Chee Leong; Ong Ewe Hock; Rosman Razak; Tan Kim Her; Jason Wong; Yong Hock Kin	Thailand; Krid Chuaynarong; Kittipon Kittikul; Natapon Sarawan; Siripong Siripool; Khunakorn Sudhisodhi; Anuphap Theeraratsakul; Apichai Teeraratsakul; Pramote Teerawiwatana
Women's team	Indonesia; Mia Audina; Indarti Isolina; Deyana Lomban; Meiluawati; Eliza Nathanael; Zelin Resiana; Susi Susanti; Minarti Timur	Thailand; Ticha Boonyarak; Natsaran Boonvorametee; Thitikan Duangsiri; Somharuthai Jaroensiri; Pornsawan Plungwech; Saralee Thungthongkam	Malaysia; Norhasikin Amin; Ang Li Peng; Ishwari Boopathy; Chong Nga Fan; Lee Yin Yin; Woon Sze Mei

== Results ==
=== Men's team ===
Quarterfinals
1	Indonesia
Bye
Philippines	3
Singapore	2
Myanmar	1
Thailand	4
Vietnam	0
2	Malaysia	5

Semifinals
1	Indonesia	5
Philippines	0
Thailand	1
2	Malaysia	4

Finals
1	Indonesia	4
2	Malaysia	1
Third place
Philippines	1
Thailand	4

==== Quarter-final ====
12 October	Philippines	3–2	Singapore

Melvin Llanes	2–1	Tan Sian Peng	8-15, 18-15, 15-9
Ian Piencenaves	2–1	Tay Kuan Yang	10-15, 15-10, 15-11
Kennevic Asuncion	1–2	Patrick Lau	15-8, 4-15, 8-15
Melvin Llanes / Ian Piencenaves	0–2	Patrick Lau / Tan Sian Peng	11-15, 10-15
Naresh Ramnani / Anthony Ave	2–0	Eric Law / Kevin Lim	15-11, 15-10

12 October	Myanmar	1–4	Thailand

Lwin Aung	0–2	Apichai Teeraratsakul	5-15, 16-18
Zaw Win	2–0	Natapon Sarawan	15-7, 15-6
Lin Naing Oo	1–2	Anuphap Theeraratsakul	10-15, 15-10, 12-15
Win Tun Thein / Zaw Win	0–2	Pramote Teerawiwatana / Siripong Siripool	5-15, 4-15
Lwin Aung / Lin Naing Oo	0–2	Khunakorn Sudhisodhi / Kittipon Kittikul	7-15, 14-17

12 October	Vietnam	0–5	Malaysia

Nguyễn Anh Hoàng	0–2	Ong Ewe Hock	7-15, 8-15
Hồ Văn Lợi	0–2	Yong Hock Kin	5-15, 5-15
Pham Le The Hung	0–2	Jason Wong	3-15, 8-15
Pham Le The Hung / Tran Quang Nhan	0–2	Chew Choon Eng / Lee Chee Leong	6-15, 10-15
Nguyễn Phú Cường / Hồ Văn Lợi	0–2	Tan Kim Her / Rosman Razak	1-15, 2-15

==== Semi-final ====
13 October	Indonesia	5–0	Philippines

Heryanto Arbi	2–0	Jaime Llanes	15-2, 15-2
Indra Wijaya	2–0	Antonio Ramir	15-2, 15-8
Joko Suprianto	2–0	Arolas Amahit	15-4, 15-1
Sigit Budiarto / Candra Wijaya	2–0	Melvin Llanes / Ian Piencenaves	15-6, 15-6
Rexy Mainaky / Ricky Subagja	2–0	Naresh Ramnani / Anthony Ave	15-2, 15-2

13 October	Thailand	1–4	Malaysia

Apichai Teeraratsakul	0–2	Ong Ewe Hock	1-15, 6-15
Natapon Sarawan	0–2	Yong Hock Kin	6-15, 2-15
Anuphap Theeraratsakul	0–2	Jason Wong	15-12, 3-15, 2-15
Pramote Teerawiwatana / Kittipon Kittikul	0–2	Tan Kim Her / Rosman Razak	7-15, 2-15
Siripong Siripool / Khunakorn Sudhisodhi	2–0	Chew Choon Eng / Lee Chee Leong	15-5, 15-12

==== Bronze-medal match ====
14 October	Philippines	1–4	Thailand

Melvin Llanes	0–2	Apichai Teeraratsakul	10-15, 16-18
Anthony Ave / Naresh Ramnani	0–2	Khunakorn Sudhisodhi / Kittipon Kittikul	4-15, 4-15
Ian Piencenaves	0–2	Anuphap Theeraratsakul	3-15, 8-15
Melvin Llanes / Ian Piencenaves	0–2	Pramote Teerawiwatana / Siripong Siripool	6-15, 10-15
Kennevic Asuncion	2–0	Krid Chuaynarong	15-12, 15-9

==== Gold-medal match ====
14 October	Indonesia	4–1	Malaysia

Heryanto Arbi	2–1	Ong Ewe Hock	15-13, 4-15, 15-13
Sigit Budiarto / Candra Wijaya	1–2	Tan Kim Her / Rosman Razak	15-9, 6-15, 14-17
Indra Wijaya	2–0	Yong Hock Kin	15-7, 15-8
Rexy Mainaky / Ricky Subagja	2–0	Chew Choon Eng / Lee Chee Leong	15-6, 15-9
Joko Suprianto	2–0	Jason Wong	15-3, 15-9

=== Women's team ===
Quarterfinals
1	Indonesia
Bye
Malaysia	5
Vietnam	0
Philippines	2
Singapore	3
Bye
2	Thailand

Semifinals
1	Indonesia	5
Malaysia	0
Singapore	2
2	Thailand	3

Finals
1	Indonesia	5
2	Thailand	0
Third place
Malaysia	4
Singapore	1

==== Quarter-final ====
12 October	Malaysia	5–0	Vietnam

Lee Yin Yin	2–0	Lam Ai Thuy	11-3, 11-0
Ishwari Boopathy	2–0	Phạm Quỳnh Anh	11-0, 11-4
Woon Sze Mei	2–0	Bùi Kim Hà	11-5, 11-3
Chong Nga Fan / Ang Li Peng	2–0	Nguyen Thi Thanh / Lam My Hanh	15-2, 15-4
Lee Yin Yin / Norhasikin Amin	2–0	Bùi Kim Hà / Phạm Quỳnh Anh	15-7, 15-6

12 October	Philippines	2–3	Singapore

Amparo Lim	0–2	Zarinah Abdullah	3-11, 8-11
Kennie Asuncion	2–1	Chin Yeng Peng	11-8, 5-11, 11-4
Maria Elena Garcia	0–2	Fatimah Kumin Lim	7-11, 1-11
Amparo Lim / Kennie Asuncion	2–0	Zarinah Abdullah / Fatimah Kumin Lim	15-5, 15-6
Maria Elena Garcia / Mylene Delgado	0–2	Chin Yeng Peng / Zanetta Lee	7-15, 1-15

==== Semi-final ====
13 October	Indonesia	5–0	Malaysia

Susi Susanti	2–0	Lee Yin Yin	11-2, 11-3
Mia Audina	2–0	Ishwari Boopathy	11-1, 11-1
Meiluawati	2–0	Woon Sze Mei	11-7, 11-3
Eliza Nathanael / Zelin Resiana	2–0	Chong Nga Fan / Ang Li Peng	15-1, 15-3
Indarti Isolina / Deyana Lomban	2–0	Lee Yin Yin / Norhasikin Amin	15-3, 15-5

13 October	Singapore	2–3	Thailand

Zarinah Abdullah	2–1	Pornsawan Plungwech	8-11, 11-6, 11-4
Chin Yeng Peng	2–0	Thitikan Duangsiri	11-8, 12-10
Fatimah Kumin Lim	0–2	Natsaran Boonvorametee	6-11, 8-11
Zarinah Abdullah / Zanetta Lee	0–2	Saralee Thungthongkam / Ticha Boonyarak	8-15, 1-15
Fatimah Kumin Lim / Chin Yeng Peng	0–2	Pornsawan Plungwech / Somharuthai Jaroensiri	3-15, 1-15

==== Bronze-medal match ====
14 October	Malaysia	4–1	Singapore

Lee Yin Yin	0–2	Zarinah Abdullah	0-11, 6-11
Ishwari Boopathy	2–0	Chin Yen Peng	11-3, 11-3
Woon Sze Mei	2–1	Fatimah Kumin Lim	11-4, 8-11, 11-2
Ang Li Peng / Norhasikin Amin	2–0	Zarinah Abdullah / Zanetta Lee	15-3, 15-10
Lee Yin Yin / Ishwari Boopathy	2–0	Chin Yen Peng / Fatimah Kumin Lim	15-12, 15-3

==== Gold-medal match ====
14 October	Indonesia	5–0	Thailand

Susi Susanti	2–0	Pornsawan Plungwech	11-1, 11-4
Indarti Isolina / Deyana Lomban	2–0	Saralee Thungthongkam / Ticha Boonyarak	15-7, 15-5
Mia Audina	2–0	Thitikan Duangsiri	11-5, 11-6
Eliza Nathanael / Zelin Resiana	2–0	Pornsawan Plungwech / Somharuthai Jaroensiri	15-5, 15-8
Meiluawati	2–0	Natsaran Boonvorametee	11-4, 11-5

=== Men's singles ===
First Round; 15 October
Heryanto Arbi (INA)
Zaw Win (MYA)
Yong Hock Kin (MAS)
Apichai Teeraratsakul (THA)
Nguyễn Anh Hoàng (VIE)
Joko Suprianto (INA)
Melvin Llanes (PHI)
Ong Ewe Hock (MAS)

Quarterfinals; 16 October
Heryanto Arbi (INA)	15	15
Zaw Win (MYA)	5	1
Yong Hock Kin (MAS)	15	15
Apichai Teeraratsakul (THA)	8	7
Nguyễn Anh Hoàng (VIE)	7	6
Joko Suprianto (INA)	15	15
Melvin Llanes (PHI)	6	7
Ong Ewe Hock (MAS)	15	15

Semifinals; 17 October
Heryanto Arbi (INA)	15	15
Yong Hock Kin (MAS)	9	11
Joko Suprianto (INA)	15	11
Ong Ewe Hock (MAS)	18	15

Final; 18 October
Heryanto Arbi (INA)	15	15
Ong Ewe Hock (MAS)	8	0
Third place
Yong Hock Kin (MAS)	5	3
Joko Suprianto (INA)	15	15

=== Women's singles ===
First Round; 15 October
Meiluawati (INA)
Natsaran Boonvorametee (THA)
Zarinah Abdullah (SIN)
Ishwari Boopathy (MAS)
Kennie Asuncion (PHI)
Pornsawan Plungwech (THA)
Fatimah Kumin Lim (SIN)
Mia Audina (INA)

Quarterfinals; 16 October
Meiluawati (INA)	11	11
Natsaran Boonvorametee (THA)	0	0
Zarinah Abdullah (SIN)	11	11
Ishwari Boopathy (MAS)	1	3
Kennie Asuncion (PHI)	4	6
Pornsawan Plungwech (THA)	11	11
Fatimah Kumin Lim (SIN)	0	0
Mia Audina (INA)	11	11

Semifinals; 17 October
Meiluawati (INA)	11	11
Zarinah Abdullah (SIN)	5	0
Pornsawan Plungwech (THA)	11	7	10
Mia Audina (INA)	6	11	12

Final; 18 October
Meiluawati (INA)	10	11
Mia Audina (INA)	12	12
Third place
Zarinah Abdullah (SIN)	10	1
Pornsawan Plungwech (THA)	12	11

=== Men's doubles ===
First Round; 15 October
1	Candra Wijaya (INA); Sigit Budiarto (INA)
Melvin Llanes (PHI); Ian Piencenaves (PHI)
Khunakorn Sudhisodhi (THA); Kittipon Kittikul (THA)
Tan Kim Her (MAS); Rosman Razak (MAS)
Tan Sian Peng (SIN); Patrick Lau (SIN)
Siripong Siripol (THA); Pramote Teerawiwatana (THA)
Chew Choon Eng (MAS); Lee Chee Leong (MAS)
2	Ricky Subagja (INA); Rexy Mainaky (INA)

Quarterfinals; 16 October
1	Candra Wijaya (INA); Sigit Budiarto (INA)	15	15
Melvin Llanes (PHI); Ian Piencenaves (PHI)	2	4
Khunakorn Sudhisodhi (THA); Kittipon Kittikul (THA)	15	15	15
Tan Kim Her (MAS); Rosman Razak (MAS)	17	9	9
Tan Sian Peng (SIN); Patrick Lau (SIN)	7	11
Siripong Siripol (THA); Pramote Teerawiwatana (THA)	15	15
Chew Choon Eng (MAS); Lee Chee Leong (MAS)	7	9
2	Ricky Subagja (INA); Rexy Mainaky (INA)	15	15

Semifinals; 17 October
1	Candra Wijaya (INA); Sigit Budiarto (INA)	15	15
Khunakorn Sudhisodhi (THA); Kittipon Kittikul (THA)	2	5
Siripong Siripol (THA); Pramote Teerawiwatana (THA)	4	15	12
2	Ricky Subagja (INA); Rexy Mainaky (INA)	15	9	15

Final; 18 October
1	Candra Wijaya (INA); Sigit Budiarto (INA)	15	14	15
2	Ricky Subagja (INA); Rexy Mainaky (INA)	4	17	11
Third place
Khunakorn Sudhisodhi (THA); Kittipon Kittikul (THA)
Siripong Siripol (THA); Pramote Teerawiwatana (THA)	w/o

=== Women's doubles ===
First Round; 15 October
Eliza Nathanael (INA); Zelin Resiana (INA)
Bùi Kim Hà (VIE); Phạm Quỳnh Anh (VIE)
Pornsawan Plungwech (THA); Thitikan Duangsiri (THA)
Amparo Lim (PHI); Kennie Asuncion (PHI)
Chin Yen Peng (SIN); Fatimah Kumin Lim (SIN)
Somharuthai Jaroensiri (THA); Saralee Thungthongkam (THA)
Lee Yin Yin (MAS); Norhasikin Amin (MAS)
Indarti Isolina (INA); Deyana Lomban (INA)

Quarterfinals; 16 October
Eliza Nathanael (INA); Zelin Resiana (INA)	15	15
Bùi Kim Hà (VIE); Phạm Quỳnh Anh (VIE)	3	1
Pornsawan Plungwech (THA); Thitikan Duangsiri (THA)	15	7	7
Amparo Lim (PHI); Kennie Asuncion (PHI)	11	15	15
Chin Yen Peng (SIN); Fatimah Kumin Lim (SIN)	0	0
Somharuthai Jaroensiri (THA); Saralee Thungthongkam (THA)	15	15
Lee Yin Yin (MAS); Norhasikin Amin (MAS)	2	4
Indarti Isolina (INA); Deyana Lomban (INA)	15	15

Semifinals; 17 October
Eliza Nathanael (INA); Zelin Resiana (INA)	15	15
Amparo Lim (PHI); Kennie Asuncion (PHI)	10	3
Somharuthai Jaroensiri (THA); Saralee Thungthongkam (THA)	3	4
Indarti Isolina (INA); Deyana Lomban (INA)	15	15

Final; 18 October
Eliza Nathanael (INA); Zelin Resiana (INA)	15	15
Indarti Isolina (INA); Deyana Lomban (INA)	5	13
Third place
Amparo Lim (PHI); Kennie Asuncion (PHI)	4	17	15
Somharuthai Jaroensiri (THA); Saralee Thungthongkam (THA)	15	14	13

=== Mixed doubles ===
First Round; 15 October
Tri Kusharjanto (INA); Minarti Timur (INA)
Tan Sian Peng (SIN); Zarinah Abdullah (SIN)
Khunakorn Sudhisodhi (THA); Somharuthai Jaroensiri (THA)
Chew Choon Eng (MAS); Ang Li Peng (MAS)
Candra Wijaya (INA); Eliza Nathanael (INA)
Kittipon Kittikul (THA); Ticha Boonyarak (THA)
Patrick Lau (SIN); Chin Yen Peng (SIN)
Cheah Soon Kit (MAS); Norhasikin Amin (MAS)

Quarterfinals; 16 October
Tri Kusharjanto (INA); Minarti Timur (INA)	15	15
Tan Sian Peng (SIN); Zarinah Abdullah (SIN)	1	2
Khunakorn Sudhisodhi (THA); Somharuthai Jaroensiri (THA)	11	9
Chew Choon Eng (MAS); Ang Li Peng (MAS)	15	15
Candra Wijaya (INA); Eliza Nathanael (INA)	15	15
Kittipon Kittikul (THA); Ticha Boonyarak (THA)	2	1
Patrick Lau (SIN); Chin Yen Peng (SIN)	7	6
Cheah Soon Kit (MAS); Norhasikin Amin (MAS)	15	15

Semifinals; 17 October
Tri Kusharjanto (INA); Minarti Timur (INA)	15	15
Chew Choon Eng (MAS); Ang Li Peng (MAS)	11	12
Candra Wijaya (INA); Eliza Nathanael (INA)	15	15
Cheah Soon Kit (MAS); Norhasikin Amin (MAS)	7	2

Final; 18 October
Tri Kusharjanto (INA); Minarti Timur (INA)	15	7	2
Candra Wijaya (INA); Eliza Nathanael (INA)	12	15	15
Third place
Chew Choon Eng (MAS); Ang Li Peng (MAS)	15	17
Cheah Soon Kit (MAS); Norhasikin Amin (MAS)	8	14

== Medal tally ==
Legend

* Host nation (Host country)

Rank	Nation	Gold	Silver	Bronze	Total
1	Indonesia (IDN)*	7	4	1	12
2	Malaysia (MYS)	0	2	2	4
3	Thailand (THA)	0	1	3	4
4	Philippines (PHI)	0	0	1	1
Totals (4 entries)		7	7	7	21
