= Anuphap Theeraratsakul =

Thai badminton player (born 1979)

Personal information
- Born: 4 October 1979 (age 47)
- Height: 1.66 m (5 ft 5 in)

Sport
- Country: Thailand
- Sport: Badminton
- Handedness: Right
- Event: Men's singles

Men's singles
- BWF profile
Medal record
Men's badminton
Representing Thailand
Southeast Asian Games
Silver medal – second place	2003 Ho Chi Minh	Men's team
Bronze medal – third place	2001 Kuala Lumpur	Men's team
Bronze medal – third place	1999 Bandar Seri Begawan	Men's team
Bronze medal – third place	1997 Jakarta	Men's team

Anuphap Theeraratsakul (Thai: อนุภาพ ธีระรัตน์สกุล; born 4 October 1979) is a Thai badminton player who specializes in singles. He won the men's singles title at the Thai national championships in 1998 and 2002, and at the same year, he represented his country at the 1998 and 2002 Asian Games. Theeraratsakul helps the Thai national team won the silver medal at the 2003 Southeast Asian Games, also the bronzes in 1997, 1999, and 2001. Together with his brother Apichai and Anurak, they found the T.Thailand badminton club.

== Achievements ==
=== IBF International ===
Men's singles
Year	Tournament	Opponent	Score	Result
2000	Smiling Fish Satellite	(Thailand) Jakrapan Thanathiratham	15–11, 15–4	(gold) Winner
1999	Myanmar International	(Thailand) Boonsak Ponsana	3–15, 6–15	(silver) Runner-up
1998	Thailand Satellite	(China) Chen Huang	17–16, 6–15, 15–5	(gold) Winner
