= Ang Li Peng =

Malaysian badminton player

Ang Li Peng 洪俪萍
Personal information
- Born: 8 July 1981 (age 45) Banting, Selangor, Malaysia
- Height: 1.65 m (5 ft 5 in)
- Weight: 54 kg (119 lb)

Sport
- Country: Malaysia
- Sport: Badminton
- Handedness: Right
- Event: Women's & mixed doubles

Women's & mixed doubles
- BWF profile
Medal record
Women's badminton
Representing Malaysia
Commonwealth Games
Gold medal – first place	2002 Manchester	Women's doubles
Southeast Asian Games
Silver medal – second place	2001 Kuala Lumpur	Women's doubles
Bronze medal – third place	1997 Jakarta	Mixed doubles
Bronze medal – third place	1997 Jakarta	Women's team
Bronze medal – third place	1999 Bandar Seri Begawan	Women's team
Bronze medal – third place	2001 Kuala Lumpur	Women's team

Ang Li Peng (born 8 July 1981) is a former Malaysian badminton player. She was the women's doubles gold medalist at the 2002 Commonwealth Games in Manchester, England. At the IBF World Grand Prix event, she won the women's doubles title in 1999 Polish Open partnered with Chor Hooi Yee. She emerged as the National champion in 2002 in the women's doubles event with Lim Pek Siah.

Ang graduated with law degree at the University of Manchester in 2010.

== Achievements ==
=== Commonwealth Games ===
Women's doubles
Year	Venue	Partner	Opponent	Score	Result
2002	Bolton Arena; Manchester, England	(Malaysia) Lim Pek Siah	(New Zealand) Nicole Gordon (New Zealand) Sara Petersen	7–8, 7–4, 2–7, 7–5, 7–0	Gold

=== Southeast Asian Games ===
Women's doubles
Year	Venue	Partner	Opponent	Score	Result
2001	Malawati Stadium; Selangor, Malaysia	(Malaysia) Lim Pek Siah	(Indonesia) Deyana Lomban (Indonesia) Vita Marissa	5–15, 15–5, 9–15	Silver

Mixed doubles
Year	Venue	Partner	Opponent	Score	Result
1997	Asia-Africa hall, Gelora Bung Karno Sports Complex; Jakarta, Indonesia	(Malaysia) Chew Choon Eng	(Malaysia) Cheah Soon Kit (Malaysia) Norhasikin Amin	15–8, 17–14	Bronze

=== IBF World Grand Prix ===
The World Badminton Grand Prix sanctioned by International Badminton Federation (IBF) since 1983.

Women's doubles
Year	Tournament	Partner	Opponent	Score	Result
1999	Polish Open	(Malaysia) Chor Hooi Yee	(Ukraine) Victoria Evtushenko (Ukraine) Elena Nozdran	2–15, 15–13, 15–10	(gold) Winner

=== IBF International ===
Year	Tournament	Partner	Opponent	Score	Result
2006	Fiji International	(Malaysia) Lim Pek Siah	(Canada) Charmaine Reid (Canada) Fiona McKee	21–5, 21–13	(gold) Winner
2005	Norwegian International	(Malaysia) Lim Pek Siah	(Germany) Nicole Grether (Germany) Juliane Schenk	8–15, 6–15	(silver) Runner-up
2002	Singapore Sateliite	(Malaysia) Lim Pek Siah	(China) Li Huei (China) Yu Peng	15–7, 15–8	(gold) Winner
1999	Singapore Sateliite	(Malaysia) Chor Hooi Yee	(Indonesia) Angeline de Pauw (Indonesia) Eny Widiowati	15–13, 8–15, 15–5	(gold) Winner
1999	French International	(Malaysia) Chor Hooi Yee	(China) Qin Yiyuan (China) Gao Ling	0–15, 3–15	(silver) Runner-up
1999	Malaysia Satellite	(Malaysia) Chor Hooi Yee	(Thailand) Sathinee Chankrachangwong (Thailand) Thitikan Duangsiri	5–15, 10–15	(silver) Runner-up
