= Badminton at the 1999 SEA Games =

- Venue: Hassanal Bolkiah Sports Complex, Bandar Seri Begawan
- Dates: August 8–14, 1999
- Nations: 7

The badminton tournament at the 1999 SEA Games was held from 8 to 14 August in Hassanal Bolkiah Sports Complex, Bandar Seri Begawan. Both men and women competed in their own team, singles, and doubles events. A mixed doubles event was also held.

== Medalists ==
Event	Gold	Silver	Bronze
Men's singles	(Indonesia) Taufik Hidayat	(Malaysia) Wong Choong Hann	(Malaysia) Roslin Hashim
Men's singles	(Indonesia) Taufik Hidayat	(Malaysia) Wong Choong Hann	(Indonesia) Rony Agustinus
Women's singles	(Indonesia) Cindana Hartono Kusuma	(Thailand) Sujitra Ekmongkolpaisarn	(Indonesia) Lidya Djaelawijaya
Women's singles	(Indonesia) Cindana Hartono Kusuma	(Thailand) Sujitra Ekmongkolpaisarn	(Thailand) Sathinee Chankrachangwong
Men's doubles	(Thailand) Tesana Panvisvas (Thailand) Pramote Teerawiwatana	(Indonesia) Eng Hian (Indonesia) Flandy Limpele	(Thailand) Kitipon Kitikul (Thailand) Khunakorn Sudhisodhi
Men's doubles	(Thailand) Tesana Panvisvas (Thailand) Pramote Teerawiwatana	(Indonesia) Eng Hian (Indonesia) Flandy Limpele	(Malaysia) Choong Tan Fook (Malaysia) Lee Wan Wah
Women's doubles	(Indonesia) Etty Tantri (Indonesia) Cynthia Tuwankotta	(Indonesia) Emma Ermawati (Indonesia) Indarti Issolina	(Thailand) Sathinee Chankrachangwong (Thailand) Thitikan Duangsiri
Women's doubles	(Indonesia) Etty Tantri (Indonesia) Cynthia Tuwankotta	(Indonesia) Emma Ermawati (Indonesia) Indarti Issolina	(Thailand) Sujitra Ekmongkolpaisarn (Thailand) Saralee Thungthongkam
Mixed doubles	(Malaysia) Chew Choon Eng (Malaysia) Chor Hooi Yee	(Malaysia) Rosman Razak (Malaysia) Norhasikin Amin	(Indonesia) Wahyu Agung Setiawan (Indonesia) Emma Ermawati
Mixed doubles	(Malaysia) Chew Choon Eng (Malaysia) Chor Hooi Yee	(Malaysia) Rosman Razak (Malaysia) Norhasikin Amin	(Thailand) Khunakorn Sudhisodhi (Thailand) Saralee Thungthongkam
Men's team	Indonesia; Rony Agustinus; Halim Haryanto; Eng Hian; Taufik Hidayat; Flandy Limpele; Jeffer Rosobin; Wahyu Agung Setiawan; Yohan Hadikusumo Wiratama	Malaysia; Chew Choon Eng; Choong Tan Fook; Roslin Hashim; Lee Wan Wah; Rosman Razak; Rashid Sidek; Wong Choong Hann; Jason Wong	Singapore; Chua Yong Hong; Gerald Hee; Ho Yeow Nam; Jack Hee; Wayne Kuo; Patrick Lau; Kendrick Lee; Mohd Fadzli Masri; Noor Izwan Paini; Zailani Yuin
Men's team	Indonesia; Rony Agustinus; Halim Haryanto; Eng Hian; Taufik Hidayat; Flandy Limpele; Jeffer Rosobin; Wahyu Agung Setiawan; Yohan Hadikusumo Wiratama	Malaysia; Chew Choon Eng; Choong Tan Fook; Roslin Hashim; Lee Wan Wah; Rosman Razak; Rashid Sidek; Wong Choong Hann; Jason Wong	Thailand; Kitipon Kitikul; Tesana Panvisvas; Boonsak Ponsana; Sudket Prapakamol; Khunakorn Sudhisodhi; Pramote Teerawiwatana; Anuphap Theeraratsakul
Women's team	Indonesia; Ellen Angelina; Lidya Djaelawijaya; Emma Ermawati; Indarti Issolina; Cindana Hartono Kusuma; Etty Tantri; Cynthia Tuwankotta	Thailand; Sathinee Chankrachangwong; Thitikan Duangsiri; Sujitra Ekmongkolpaisarn; Saralee Thungthongkam	Vietnam; Le Thị Kim Anh; Ngô Hải Vân; Nguyễn Hạnh Dung; Trần Thị Thanh Thảo
Women's team	Indonesia; Ellen Angelina; Lidya Djaelawijaya; Emma Ermawati; Indarti Issolina; Cindana Hartono Kusuma; Etty Tantri; Cynthia Tuwankotta	Thailand; Sathinee Chankrachangwong; Thitikan Duangsiri; Sujitra Ekmongkolpaisarn; Saralee Thungthongkam	Malaysia; Norhasikin Amin; Ang Li Peng; Chor Hooi Yee; Ng Mee Fen; Joanne Quay; Woon Sze Mei; Lee Yin Yin

== Results ==
=== Men's team ===
Quarter-final
Singapore	3
Brunei	1
Vietnam	0
Thailand	5
Philippines	0
2	Malaysia	5

Semi-Final
1	Indonesia	5
Singapore	0
Thailand	0
2	Malaysia	3

Final
1	Indonesia	3
2	Malaysia	0

==== Quarter-final ====
8 August	Singapore	3–1	Brunei

Patrick Lau	2–0	Mohd Fadzli Masri	15-6, 15-3
Kendrick Lee	1–2	Amran Kambar	15-13, 10-15, 9-15
Noor Izwan Paini	2–0	Ak Noor Rumaizi	15-8, 15-2
Jack Hee / Ho Yeow Nam	2–0	Mohd Fadzli Masri / Zailani Yuin	15-7, 17-14
Patrick Lau / Noor Izwan Paini		Ermadena Hj Talip / Michael Nyau	results not available

8 August	Vietnam	0–5	Thailand

Nguyễn Anh Hoàng	0–2	Boonsak Ponsana	5-15, 3-15
Hồ Văn Lợi	0–2	Anuphap Theeraratsakul	2-15, 6-15
Nguyễn Phú Cường	0–2	Sudket Prapakamol	13-15, 6-15
Nguyễn Anh Hoàng / Hồ Văn Lợi	0–2	Pramote Teerawiwatana / Tesana Panvisvas	3-15, 7-15
Nguyễn Phú Cường / Trần Đức Sang	0–2	Khunakorn Sudhisodhi / Kitipon Kitikul	2-15, 4-15

8 August	Philippines	0–5	Malaysia

Melvin Llanes	0–2	Rashid Sidek	5-15, 1-15
Ian Piencenaves	0–2	Mohd. Roslin Hashim	4-15, 2-15
Amahit Arolas Jr.	0–2	Jason Wong	5-15, 9-15
Melvin Llanes / Ian Piencenaves	0–2	Choong Tan Fook / Lee Wan Wah	5-15, 4-15
Jaime Llanes / Amahit Arolas Jr.	0–2	Wong Choong Hann / Chew Choon Eng	3-15, 4-15

==== Semi-final ====
9 August	Indonesia	5–0	Singapore

Taufik Hidayat	2–0	Gerald Hee	15-2, 15-5
Eng Hian / Flandy Limpele	2–0	Jack Hee / Ho Yeow Nam	15-1, 15-5
Jeffer Rosobin	2–0	Chua Yong Hong	15-4, 15-0
Wahyu Agung Setiawan / Halim Haryanto	2–0	Gerald Hee / Wayne Kuo	15-0, 15-1
Rony Agustinus	2–0	Kendrick Lee	15-6, 15-3

9 August	Thailand	0–3	Malaysia

Boonsak Ponsana	1–2	Wong Choong Hann	14-17, 15-12, 4-15
Khunakorn Sudhisodhi / Kitipon Kitikul	0–2	Rosman Razak / Chew Choon Eng	10-15, 13-15
Anuphap Theeraratsakul	1–2	Rashid Sidek	12-15, 15-0, 10-15

==== Final ====
10 August	Indonesia	3–0	Malaysia

Taufik Hidayat	2–0	Wong Choong Hann	15-5, 15-2
Eng Hian / Flandy Limpele	2–1	Choong Tan Fook / Lee Wan Wah	15-3, 6-15, 15-12
Rony Agustinus	2–1	Rashid Sidek	15-8, 5-15, 15-12

=== Women's team ===
Semi-final
1	Indonesia	5
Vietnam	0
Malaysia	1
2	Thailand	3

Final
1	Indonesia	3
2	Thailand	0

==== Semi-final ====
9 August	Indonesia	5–0	Vietnam

Cindana Hartono Kusuma	2–0	Le Thị Kim Anh	11-3, 11-5
Lidya Djaelawijaya	2–0	Trần Thị Thanh Thảo	11-0, 11-1
Ellen Angelina	2–0	Ngô Hải Vân	11-4, 11-4
Etty Tantri / Cynthia Tuwankotta	2–0	Le Thị Kim Anh / Trần Thị Thanh Thảo	15-2, 15-0
Indarti Issolina / Emma Ermawati	2–0	Nguyễn Hạnh Dung / Ngô Hải Vân	15-3, 4-0(r)

9 August	Malaysia	1–3	Thailand

Ng Mee Fen	0–2	Sujitra Ekmongkolpaisarn	6-11, 4-11
Woon Sze Mei	2–0	Sathinee Chankrachangwong	11-6, 13-11
Joanne Quay / Ang Li Peng	1–2	Sujitra Ekmongkolpaisarn / Saralee Thungthongkam	15-13, 12-15, 13-15
Lee Yin Yin	0–2	Thitikan Duangsiri	1-11, 0-11

==== Final ====
10 August	Indonesia	3–0	Thailand

Cindana Hartono Kusuma	2–0	Sujitra Ekmongkolpaisarn	11-6, 11-1
Lidya Djaelawijaya	2–0	Sathinee Chankrachangwong	11-0, 11-2
Etty Tantri / Cynthia Tuwankotta	2–1	Sujitra Ekmongkolpaisarn / Saralee Thungthongkam	15-9, 6-15, 15-2

=== Men's singles ===
Round of 16; 11 August
1	Wong Choong Hann (MAS)
Bye
Ian Piencenaves (PHI)	15	16	15
Ak Noor Rumaizi (BRU)	12	17	5
4	Rony Agustinus (INA)	15	15
Hồ Văn Lợi (VIE)	8	1
Boonsak Ponsana (THA)	15	15
Patrick Lau (SIN)	5	13
Melvin Llanes (PHI)	2	2
Anuphap Theeraratsakul (THA)	15	15
Kendrick Lee (SIN)	6	1
3	Roslin Hashim (MAS)	15	15
Arman Kambar (BRU)	15	15
Nguyễn Phú Cường (VIE)	6	6
Bye
2	Taufik Hidayat (INA)

Quarterfinal; 12 August
1	Wong Choong Hann (MAS)	15	15
Ian Piencenaves (PHI)	8	5
4	Rony Agustinus (INA)	15	15
Boonsak Ponsana (THA)	7	8
Anuphap Theeraratsakul (THA)	12	7
3	Roslin Hashim (MAS)	15	15
Arman Kambar (BRU)	2	3
2	Taufik Hidayat (INA)	15	15

Semifinal; 13 August
1	Wong Choong Hann (MAS)	17	15
4	Rony Agustinus (INA)	15	2
3	Roslin Hashim (MAS)	8	13
2	Taufik Hidayat (INA)	15	15

Final; 14 August
1	Wong Choong Hann (MAS)	10	15	11
2	Taufik Hidayat (INA)	15	11	15

=== Women's singles ===
Round of 16; 11 August
1	Cindana Hartono Kusuma (INA)
Bye
Kennie Asuncion (PHI)
Bye
Woon Sze Mei (MAS)
Bye
Sathinee Chankrachangwong (THA)	11	11
Le Thị Kim Anh (VIE)	4	2
Ng Mee Fen (MAS)	11	11
Winnie Lim (PHI)	3	2
Bye
Sujitra Ekmongkolpaisarn (THA)
Bye
Nguyễn Hạnh Dung (VIE)
Bye
2	Lidya Djaelawijaya (INA)

Quarterfinal; 12 August
1	Cindana Hartono Kusuma (INA)	11	11
Kennie Asuncion (PHI)	1	0
Woon Sze Mei (MAS)	2	10
Sathinee Chankrachangwong (THA)	11	13
Ng Mee Fen (MAS)	3	8
Sujitra Ekmongkolpaisarn (THA)	11	11
Nguyễn Hạnh Dung (VIE)	1	2
2	Lidya Djaelawijaya (INA)	11	11

Semifinal; 13 August
1	Cindana Hartono Kusuma (INA)	11	11
Sathinee Chankrachangwong (THA)	1	2
Sujitra Ekmongkolpaisarn (THA)	11	10	11
2	Lidya Djaelawijaya (INA)	9	13	9

Final; 14 August
1	Cindana Hartono Kusuma (INA)	11	11
Sujitra Ekmongkolpaisarn (THA)	5	2

=== Men's doubles ===
Round of 16; 11 August
1	Flandy Limpele (INA); Eng Hian (INA)
Bye
Ian Piencenaves (PHI); Melvin Llanes (PHI)	15	15
Zailani Yuin (BRU); Mohd Fadzli Masri (BRU)	10	8
Chew Choon Eng (MAS); Rosman Razak (MAS)	15	15
Nguyễn Anh Hoàng (VIE); Hồ Văn Lợi (VIE)	3	3
Khunakorn Sudhisodhi (THA); Kitipon Kitikul (THA)	15	15
Patrick Lau (SIN); Noor Izwan Paini (SIN)	3	2
Jack Hee (SIN); Ho Yeow Nam (SIN)	5	2
Halim Haryanto (INA); Wahyu Agung Setiawan (INA)	15	15
Amahit Arolas Jr. (PHI); Jaime Llanes (PHI)	1	9
Lee Wan Wah (MAS); Choong Tan Fook (MAS)	15	15
Ermadena Hj Talip (BRU); Michael Nyau Mee Yinn (BRU)	15	8	7
Nguyễn Phú Cường (VIE); Trần Đức Sang (VIE)	12	15	15
Bye
2	Pramote Teerawiwatana (THA); Tesana Panvisvas (THA)

Quarterfinal; 12 August
1	Flandy Limpele (INA); Eng Hian (INA)	15	15
Ian Piencenaves (PHI); Melvin Llanes (PHI)	4	9
Chew Choon Eng (MAS); Rosman Razak (MAS)	5	5
Khunakorn Sudhisodhi (THA); Kitipon Kitikul (THA)	15	15
Halim Haryanto (INA); Wahyu Agung Setiawan (INA)	10	13
Lee Wan Wah (MAS); Choong Tan Fook (MAS)	15	15
Nguyễn Phú Cường (VIE); Trần Đức Sang (VIE)	9	4
2	Pramote Teerawiwatana (THA); Tesana Panvisvas (THA)	15	15

Semifinal; 13 August
1	Flandy Limpele (INA); Eng Hian (INA)	15	15
Khunakorn Sudhisodhi (THA); Kitipon Kitikul (THA)	3	7
Lee Wan Wah (MAS); Choong Tan Fook (MAS)	15	10	12
2	Pramote Teerawiwatana (THA); Tesana Panvisvas (THA)	12	15	15

Final; 14 August
1	Flandy Limpele (INA); Eng Hian (INA)	8	15	13
2	Pramote Teerawiwatana (THA); Tesana Panvisvas (THA)	15	8	15

=== Women's doubles ===
Round of 16; 11 August
1	Etty Tantri (INA); Cynthia Tuwankotta (INA)
Bye
Ngô Hải Vân (VIE); Nguyễn Hạnh Dung (VIE)
Bye
Sathinee Chankrachangwong (THA); Thitikan Duangsiri (THA)
Bye
Ang Li Peng (MAS); Chor Hooi Yee (MAS)
Bye
Le Thị Kim Anh (VIE); Trần Thị Thanh Thảo (VIE)	1	1
Indarti Issolina (INA); Emma Ermawati (INA)	15	15
Bye
Norhasikin Amin (MAS); Joanne Quay (MAS)
Bye
Winnie Lim (PHI); Kennie Asuncion (PHI)
Bye
2	Sujitra Ekmongkolpaisarn (THA); Saralee Thungthongkam (THA)

Quarterfinal; 12 August
1	Etty Tantri (INA); Cynthia Tuwankotta (INA)	15	15
Ngô Hải Vân (VIE); Nguyễn Hạnh Dung (VIE)	3	2
Sathinee Chankrachangwong (THA); Thitikan Duangsiri (THA)	15	15
Ang Li Peng (MAS); Chor Hooi Yee (MAS)	13	11
Indarti Issolina (INA); Emma Ermawati (INA)	15	15
Norhasikin Amin (MAS); Joanne Quay (MAS)	3	4
Winnie Lim (PHI); Kennie Asuncion (PHI)	3	4
2	Sujitra Ekmongkolpaisarn (THA); Saralee Thungthongkam (THA)	15	15

Semifinal; 13 August
1	Etty Tantri (INA); Cynthia Tuwankotta (INA)	15	15
Sathinee Chankrachangwong (THA); Thitikan Duangsiri (THA)	1	6
Indarti Issolina (INA); Emma Ermawati (INA)	15	15
2	Sujitra Ekmongkolpaisarn (THA); Saralee Thungthongkam (THA)	10	11

Final; 14 August
1	Etty Tantri (INA); Cynthia Tuwankotta (INA)	17	15
Indarti Issolina (INA); Emma Ermawati (INA)	15	6

=== Mixed doubles ===
Round of 16; 11 August
1	Wahyu Agung Setiawan (INA); Emma Ermawati (INA)
Bye
Trần Đức Sang (VIE); Le Thị Kim Anh (VIE)
Bye
Chew Choon Eng (MAS); Chor Hooi Yee (MAS)
Bye
Kitipon Kitikul (THA); Thitikan Duangsiri (THA)	15	3	15
Ian Piencenaves (PHI); Winnie Lim (PHI)	10	15	13
Nguyễn Phú Cường (VIE); Trần Thị Thanh Thảo (VIE)	1	3
Rosman Razak (MAS); Norhasikin Amin (MAS)	15	15
Bye
Halim Haryanto (INA); Indarti Issolina (INA)
Bye
Melvin Llanes (PHI); Kennie Asuncion (PHI)
Bye
2	Khunakorn Sudhisodhi (THA); Saralee Thungthongkam (THA)

Quarterfinal; 12 August
1	Wahyu Agung Setiawan (INA); Emma Ermawati (INA)	15	15
Trần Đức Sang (VIE); Le Thị Kim Anh (VIE)	6	8
Chew Choon Eng (MAS); Chor Hooi Yee (MAS)	15	15
Kitipon Kitikul (THA); Thitikan Duangsiri (THA)	7	6
Rosman Razak (MAS); Norhasikin Amin (MAS)	15	15
Halim Haryanto (INA); Indarti Issolina (INA)	13	10
Melvin Llanes (PHI); Kennie Asuncion (PHI)	6	2
2	Khunakorn Sudhisodhi (THA); Saralee Thungthongkam (THA)	15	15

Semifinal; 13 August
1	Wahyu Agung Setiawan (INA); Emma Ermawati (INA)	15	10	4
Chew Choon Eng (MAS); Chor Hooi Yee (MAS)	9	15	15
Rosman Razak (MAS); Norhasikin Amin (MAS)	17	15
2	Khunakorn Sudhisodhi (THA); Saralee Thungthongkam (THA)	16	12

Final; 14 August
Chew Choon Eng (MAS); Chor Hooi Yee (MAS)	12	15	15
Rosman Razak (MAS); Norhasikin Amin (MAS)	15	6	7

== Medal tally ==
Rank	Nation	Gold	Silver	Bronze	Total
1	Indonesia (IDN)	5	2	3	10
2	Malaysia (MYS)	1	3	3	7
3	Thailand (THA)	1	2	6	9
4	Singapore (SIN)	0	0	1	1
4	Vietnam (VIE)	0	0	1	1
Totals (5 entries)		7	7	14	28
