= Sathinee Chankrachangwong =

Thai badminton player (born 1982)

Personal information
- Born: 25 June 1982 (age 44) Bangkok, Thailand
- Height: 1.67 m (5 ft 6 in)
- Weight: 62 kg (137 lb)

Sport
- Country: Thailand
- Sport: Badminton
- Handedness: Right
- Event: Women's singles & doubles

Women's singles & doubles
- BWF profile
Medal record
Women's badminton
Representing Thailand
Asian Games
Bronze medal – third place	2002 Busan	Women's team
Asian Championships
Bronze medal – third place	2002 Bangkok	Women's doubles
Bronze medal – third place	2004 Kuala Lumpur	Women's doubles
Southeast Asian Games
Gold medal – first place	2005 Manila	Women's team
Silver medal – second place	1999 Bandar Seri Begawan	Women's team
Silver medal – second place	2001 Kuala Lumpur	Women's team
Bronze medal – third place	1999 Bandar Seri Begawan	Women's singles
Bronze medal – third place	1999 Bandar Seri Begawan	Women's doubles
Bronze medal – third place	2005 Manila	Women's doubles

Sathinee Chankrachangwong (Thai: สาธินี จันทร์กระจ่างวงศ์; born 25 June 1982) is a badminton player from Thailand.

Chankrachangwong competed in badminton at the 2004 Summer Olympics in women's doubles with partner Saralee Thungthongkam. They defeated Denyse Julien and Anna Rice of Canada in the first round, and Chikako Nakayama and Keiko Yoshimoti of Japan in the second. In the quarterfinals, Chankrachangwong and Thungthongkam lost to Zhang Jiewen and Yang Wei of China 15-2, 15-4.

== Achievements ==
=== Asian Championships ===
Women's doubles
Year	Venue	Partner	Opponent	Score	Result
2004	Kuala Lumpur Badminton Stadium; Kuala Lumpur, Malaysia	(Thailand) Saralee Thungthongkam	(China) Du Jing (China) Yu Yang	10–15, 7–15	Bronze
2002	Bangkok, Thailand	(Thailand) Saralee Thungthongkam	(China) Yang Wei (China) Zhang Jiewen	6–11, 2–11	Bronze

=== Southeast Asian Games ===
Women's singles
Year	Venue	Opponent	Score	Result
1999	Hassanal Bolkiah Sports Complex; Bandar Seri Begawan, Brunei	(Indonesia) Cindana Hartono Kusuma	1–11, 2–11	Bronze

Women's doubles
Year	Venue	Partner	Opponent	Score	Result
2005	PhilSports Arena; Metro Manila, Philippines	(Thailand) Saralee Thungthongkam	(Indonesia) Jo Novita (Indonesia) Greysia Polii	8–15, 15–17	Bronze
1999	Hassanal Bolkiah Sports Complex; Bandar Seri Begawan, Brunei	(Thailand) Thitikan Duangsiri	(Indonesia) Etty Tantri (Indonesia) Cynthia Tuwankotta	1–15, 6–15	Bronze

=== IBF World Grand Prix ===
The World Badminton Grand Prix sanctioned by International Badminton Federation (IBF) since 1983.

Women's doubles
Year	Tournament	Partner	Opponent	Score	Result
2006	Thailand Open	(Thailand) Saralee Thungthongkam	(South Korea) Lee Kyung-won (South Korea) Lee Hyo-jung	18–21, 9–21	(silver) Runner-up
2004	Singapore Open	(Thailand) Saralee Thungthongkam	(China) Yang Wei (China) Zhang Jiewen	5–15, 15–9, 11–15	(silver) Runner-up
2002	Dutch Open	(Thailand) Saralee Thungthongkam	(Denmark) Ann-Lou Jorgensen (Denmark) Rikke Olsen	3–11, 5–11	(silver) Runner-up
2002	Indonesia Open	(Thailand) Saralee Thungthongkam	(China) Gao Ling (China) Huang Sui	5–11, 4–11	(silver) Runner-up
2002	Chinese Taipei Open	(Thailand) Saralee Thungthongkam	(South Korea) Hwang Yu-mi (South Korea) Lee Hyo-jung	4–11, 13–12, 11–8	(gold) Winner
2001	Hong Kong Open	(Thailand) Saralee Thungthongkam	(Singapore) Liu Zhen (Singapore) Xiao Luxi	6–8, 7–3, 7–2, 7–8, 3–7	(silver) Runner-up

=== IBF International ===
Women's doubles
Year	Tournament	Partner	Opponent	Score	Result
2002	Smiling Fish Satellite	(Thailand) Salakjit Ponsana	(Thailand) Duanganong Aroonkesorn (Thailand) Kunchala Voravichitchaikul	7–1, 1–7, 6–8	(silver) Runner-up
2001	Smiling Fish Satellite	(Thailand) Sujitra Ekmongkolpaisarn	(Thailand) Duanganong Aroonkesorn (Thailand) Kunchala Voravichitchaikul	13–15, 15–5, 15–9	(gold) Winner
2000	Smiling Fish Satellite	(Thailand) Thitikan Duangsiri	(Singapore) Jiang Yanmei (Singapore) Fatimah Kumin Lim	10–15, 17–16, 15–13	(gold) Winner
1999	Malaysia Satellite	(Thailand) Thitikan Duangsiri	(Malaysia) Ang Li Peng (Malaysia) Chor Hooi Yee	15–5, 15–10	(gold) Winner

Mixed doubles
Year	Tournament	Partner	Opponent	Score	Result
2003	Smiling Fish Satellite	(Thailand) Sudket Prapakamol	(Thailand) Songphon Anugritayawon (Thailand) Duanganong Aroonkesorn		(silver) Runner-up
2002	Smiling Fish Satellite	(Thailand) Songphon Anugritayawon	(Thailand) Panuwat Ngernsrisul (Thailand) Kunchala Voravichitchaikul	3–7, 7–5, 3–7	(silver) Runner-up
1999	Smiling Fish Satellite	(Thailand) Sudket Prapakamol	(Thailand) Anurak Thiraratsakul (Thailand) Methinee Narawirawuth	11–15, 9–15	(silver) Runner-up
