= Badminton at the 1998 Asian Games – Women's team =

Women's team at the 1998 Asian Games
- Venue: Thammasat Gymnasium 2
- Dates: 8–11 December
- Nations: 8

Medalists
gold medal	China; Dai Yun, Ge Fei, Gong Zhichao, Gu Jun, Qin Yiyuan, Tang Hetian, Ye Zhaoying, Zhang Ning
silver medal	South Korea; Chung Jae-hee, Kim Ji-hyun, Kim Shin-young, Lee Joo-hyun, Lee Kyung-won, Lee Soon-deuk, Ra Kyung-min, Yim Kyung-jin
bronze medal	Japan; Takako Ida, Saori Ito, Yoshiko Iwata, Haruko Matsuda, Yasuko Mizui, Kanako Yonekura
bronze medal	Indonesia; Mia Audina, Carmelita, Indarti Issolina, Cindana Hartono Kusuma, Deyana Lomban, Meiluawati, Eliza Nathanael, Minarti Timur

The Badminton women's team event at the 1998 Asian Games was scheduled from 8th - 11 December 1998 at Thamassat University Sports Complex, Bangkok, Thailand.

== Schedule ==
All times are Indochina Time (UTC+07:00)

Date	Time	Event
Tuesday, 8 December 1998	13:00	Quarterfinals
Wednesday, 9 December 1998	13:00	Quarterfinals
Thursday, 10 December 1998	13:00	Semifinals
Friday, 11 December 1998	13:00	Final

== Results ==
Quarterfinals
1	China	5
Hong Kong	0
Japan	4
Thailand	1
Chinese Taipei	2
South Korea	3
Malaysia	0
2	Indonesia	5

Semifinals
1	China	5
Japan	0
South Korea	4
2	Indonesia	1

Final
1	China	3
South Korea	1

=== Quarterfinals ===
9 December	China	5–0	Hong Kong

9 December	Japan	4–1	Thailand

8 December	Chinese Taipei	2–3	South Korea

8 December	Malaysia	0–5	Indonesia

Woon Sze Mei	0–2	Mia Audina	1–11, 2–11
Lim Pek Siah / Chor Hooi Yee	0–2	Eliza Nathanael / Deyana Lomban	6–15, 10–15
Lee Yin Yin	0–2	Meiluawati	3–11, 2–11
Law Pei Pei / Joanne Quay	0–2	Indarti Issolina / Carmelita	0–15, 1–15
Ng Mee Fen	0–2	Cindana Hartono Kusuma	3–15, 7–15

=== Semifinals ===
10 December	China	5–0	Japan

Ye Zhaoying	2–0	Yasuko Mizui	11–3, 11–6
Ge Fei / Gu Jun	2–0	Yoshiko Iwata / Haruko Matsuda	15–4, 15–5
Gong Zhichao	2–0	Kanako Yonekura
Qin Yiyuan / Tang Hetian	2–1
Dai Yun	2–0	Takako Ida

10 December	South Korea	4–1	Indonesia

Kim Ji-hyun	2–0	Mia Audina	11–6, 11–5
Yim Kyung-jin / Chung Jae-hee	2–1	Deyana Lomban / Indarti Issolina	17–14, 1–15, 15–7
Lee Joo-hyun	0–2	Meiluawati	1–11, 8–11
Ra Kyung-min / Kim Shin-young	2–0	Eliza Nathanael / Minarti Timur	15–2, 15–12
Lee Kyung-won	2–1	Cindana Hartono Kusuma	11–8, 8–11, 11–5

=== Final ===
11 December	China	3–1	South Korea

Ye Zhaoying	2–0	Kim Ji-hyun	11–9, 13–11
Ge Fei / Gu Jun	2–0	Ra Kyung-min / Chung Jae-hee	15–13, 15–11
Gong Zhichao	2–0	Lee Joo-hyun	11–4, 11–1
Tang Hetian / Zhang Ning	0–2	Kim Shin-young / Yim Kyung-jin	11–15, 7–15
