= Deyana Lomban =

Indonesian badminton player

Personal information
- Born: Deyana Gresye Susanti Lomban; 27 January 1976 (age 50) Manado, North Sulawesi, Indonesia
- Height: 1.65 m (5 ft 5 in)
- Weight: 60 kg (132 lb)

Sport
- Country: Indonesia
- Sport: Badminton
- Handedness: Right
- Event: Women's & mixed doubles

Women's & mixed doubles
- BWF profile
Medal record
Women's badminton
Representing Indonesia
Sudirman Cup
Silver medal – second place	2001 Seville	Mixed team
Bronze medal – third place	1997 Glasgow	Mixed team
Bronze medal – third place	1999 Copenhagen	Mixed team
Uber Cup
Gold medal – first place	1996 Hong Kong	Women's team
Silver medal – second place	1998 Hong Kong	Women's team
Bronze medal – third place	2000 Kuala Lumpur	Women's team
Asian Games
Silver medal – second place	1998 Bangkok	Women's doubles
Bronze medal – third place	1998 Bangkok	Women's team
Asian Championships
Silver medal – second place	1996 Surabaya	Women's doubles
Silver medal – second place	2001 Manila	Women's doubles
Bronze medal – third place	1998 Bangkok	Women's doubles
Asian Cup
Silver medal – second place	1996 Seoul	Women's doubles
Southeast Asian Games
Gold medal – first place	1997 Jakarta	Women's team
Gold medal – first place	2001 Kuala Lumpur	Women's doubles
Gold medal – first place	2001 Kuala Lumpur	Women's team
Silver medal – second place	1997 Jakarta	Women's doubles

Deyana Gresye Susanti Lomban (born 27 January 1976) is a former Indonesian badminton player who also plays for the PB Jaya Raya. She competed at the 2000 Summer Olympics in the women's doubles event partnered with Eliza Nathanael. Lomban who was partnered with Vita Marissa in the women's doubles event was part of Indonesia triumph by made a clean sweep of the five titles at the 2001 Indonesia Open. Lomban with her ability in jumping smash, had won four World Grand Prix titles with three different partners, winning German and Thailand Open in 1996 with Indarti Issolina; two times champion at the Indonesia Open in 1998 with Eliza Nathanael and in 2001 with Marissa. Lomban opted out from the national team in 2002, and moved to the United States in 2003. She then began her career as a badminton coach in 2009.

== Achievements ==
=== Asian Games ===
Women's doubles
Year	Venue	Partner	Opponent	Score	Result
1998	Thammasat Gymnasium 2, Bangkok, Thailand	(Indonesia) Eliza Nathanael	(China) Ge Fei (China) Gu Jun	15–12, 9–15, 11–15	Silver

=== Asian Championships ===
Women's doubles
Year	Venue	Partner	Opponent	Score	Result
1996	Pancasila Hall, Surabaya, Indonesia	(Indonesia) Indarti Issolina	(Indonesia) Finarsih (Indonesia) Eliza Nathanael	8–15, 6–15	Silver
1998	Nimibutr Stadium, Bangkok, Thailand	(Indonesia) Eliza Nathanael	(China) Ge Fei (China) Gu Jun	2–15, 10–15	Bronze
2001	PhilSports Arena, Manila, Philippines	(Indonesia) Vita Marissa	(China) Gao Ling (China) Huang Sui	15–12, 4–15, 6–15	Silver

=== Asian Cup ===
Women's doubles
Year	Venue	Partner	Opponent	Score	Result
1996	Olympic Gymnasium No. 2, Seoul, South Korea	(Indonesia) Indarti Issolina	(South Korea) Chung So-young (South Korea) Jang Hye-ock	7–15, 8–15	Silver

=== Southeast Asian Games ===
Women's doubles
Year	Venue	Partner	Opponent	Score	Result
1997	Asia-Africa hall, Gelora Bung Karno Sports Complex Jakarta, Indonesia	(Indonesia) Indarti Issolina	(Indonesia) Eliza Nathanael (Indonesia) Zelin Resiana	5–15, 13–15	Silver
2001	Malawati Stadium, Selangor, Malaysia	(Indonesia) Vita Marissa	(Malaysia) Lim Pek Siah (Malaysia) Ang Li Peng	15–5, 4–15, 15–9	Gold

=== IBF World Grand Prix ===
The World Badminton Grand Prix was sanctioned by the International Badminton Federation from 1983 to 2006.

Women's doubles
Year	Tournament	Partner	Opponent	Score	Result
1996	German Open	(Indonesia) Indarti Issolina	(Netherlands) Eline Coene (Netherlands) Erica van den Heuvel	18–15, 18–13	(gold) Winner
1996	Hong Kong Open	(Indonesia) Indarti Issolina	(Denmark) Lisbet Stuer-Lauridsen (Denmark) Marlene Thomsen	9–15, 12–15	(silver) Runner-up
1996	Thailand Open	(Indonesia) Indarti Issolina	(Denmark) Lisbet Stuer-Lauridsen (Denmark) Marlene Thomsen	15–9, 15–4	(gold) Winner
1997	Singapore Open	(Indonesia) Indarti Issolina	(China) Ge Fei (China) Gu Jun	4–15, 9–15	(silver) Runner-up
1997	Vietnam Open	(Indonesia) Indarti Issolina	(Indonesia) Eliza Nathanael (Indonesia) Zelin Resiana	11–15, 15–12, 11–15	(silver) Runner-up
1998	Indonesia Open	(Indonesia) Eliza Nathanael	(Denmark) Rikke Olsen (Denmark) Marlene Thomsen	7–15, 17–15, 15–7	(gold) Winner
1999	Indonesia Open	(Indonesia) Eliza Nathanael	(Denmark) Helene Kirkegaard (Denmark) Rikke Olsen	12–15, 7–15	(silver) Runner-up
2001	Indonesia Open	(Indonesia) Vita Marissa	(Denmark) Ann-Lou Jørgensen (Denmark) Jane F. Bramsen	7–5, 7–5, 7–3	(gold) Winner

IBF Grand Prix tournament
IBF Grand Prix Finals tournament
