= Roslin Hashim =

Malaysian badminton player

Muhammad Roslin Hashim
Personal information
- Born: Muhammad Roslin bin Hashim; 23 October 1975 (age 51) Kota Bharu, Kelantan, Malaysia
- Years active: 1996–2009
- Height: 1.75 m (5 ft 9 in)
- Weight: 65 kg (143 lb)

Sport
- Country: Malaysia
- Sport: Badminton
- Handedness: Right

Men's singles
- Highest ranking: 1 (30 Apr 2001)
- BWF profile
Medal record
Men's badminton
Representing Malaysia
Thomas Cup
Silver medal – second place	1998 Hong Kong	Men's team
Silver medal – second place	2002 Guangzhou	Men's team
Asian Games
Bronze medal – third place	1998 Bangkok	Men's team
SEA Games
Gold medal – first place	2001 Kuala Lumpur	Men's singles
Gold medal – first place	2001 Kuala Lumpur	Men's team
Silver medal – second place	1995 Chiang Mai	Men's team
Silver medal – second place	1999 Bandar Seri Begawan	Men's team
Bronze medal – third place	1995 Chiang Mai	Mixed doubles
Bronze medal – third place	1999 Bandar Seri Begawan	Men's singles
Bronze medal – third place	2003 Vietnam	Men's singles
Bronze medal – third place	2003 Vietnam	Men's team

Muhammad Roslin bin Hashim (born 23 October 1975) is a Malaysian former badminton player. Hashim was a gold medalists in the men's singles at the 2001 SEA Games. He is the elder brother of Muhammad Hafiz Hashim.

== Career ==
=== 2004 Summer Olympics ===
Hashim played badminton at the 2004 Summer Olympics in men's singles, losing in the first round to the bronze medalist Soni Dwi Kuncoro of Indonesia.

=== BAM relationship ===
In 2007, Hashim had several problems with the Badminton Association of Malaysia (BAM) and threatened to take them to court, because they forgot to enter his name for the Singapore Open and Indonesia Open, in addition to the 2006 China Open and the 2007 Malaysia Super Series.

== Achievements ==
=== SEA Games ===
Men's singles
Year	Venue	Opponent	Score	Result
1999	Hassanal Bolkiah Sports Complex, Bandar Seri Begawan, Brunei	(Indonesia) Taufik Hidayat	8–15, 3–15	Bronze
2001	Malawati Stadium, Selangor, Malaysia	(Thailand) Boonsak Ponsana	17–14, 15–3	(gold) Gold
2003	Tan Binh Sport Center, Ho Chi Minh City, Vietnam	(Indonesia) Sony Dwi Kuncoro	8–15, 1–15	Bronze

Mixed doubles
Year	Venue	Partner	Opponent	Score	Result
1995	700th Anniversary Sport Complex; Chiang Mai, Thailand	(Malaysia) Chor Hooi Yee	(Indonesia) Tri Kusharjanto (Indonesia) Minarti Timur	1–15, 1–15	Bronze

=== BWF Grand Prix ===
The BWF Grand Prix has two levels, the BWF Grand Prix and Grand Prix Gold. It is a series of badminton tournaments sanctioned by the Badminton World Federation (BWF) since 2007. The World Badminton Grand Prix sanctioned by International Badminton Federation (IBF) from 1983 to 2006.

Men's singles
Year	Tournament	Opponent	Score	Result
1998	Dutch Open	(Sweden) Thomas Johansson	15–12, 15–6	(gold) Winner
2000	Dutch Open	(China) Chen Hong	11–15, 17–15, 7–15	(silver) Runner-up
2001	Swiss Open	(Malaysia) Lee Tsuen Seng	1–7, 7–4, 7–4, 7–0	(gold) Winner
2001	Japan Open	(South Korea) Lee Hyun-il	15–11, 15–6	(gold) Winner
2006	Philippine Open	(Malaysia) Muhd Hafiz Hashim	19–21, 7–21	(silver) Runner-up
2006	Korean Open	(China) Bao Chunlai	18–21, 16–21	(silver) Runner-up
2007	Vietnam Open	(Indonesia) Andre Kurniawan Tedjono	21–12, 25–23	(gold) Winner
2008	Chinese Taipei Open	(Indonesia) Simon Santoso	18–21, 21–13, 10–21	(silver) Runner-up

BWF Grand Prix Gold tournament
BWF Grand Prix tournament
