= Tesana Panvisvas =

Thai badminton player

Tesana Panvisavas
Personal information
- Born: 14 March 1978 (age 48)
- Height: 1.92 m (6 ft 4 in)
- Weight: 83 kg (183 lb)

Sport
- Country: Thailand
- Sport: Badminton
- Handedness: Right
- Event: Men's doubles

Men's doubles
- BWF profile
Medal record
Men's badminton
Representing Thailand
Asian Games
Silver medal – second place	2002 Busan	Men's doubles
Asian Championships
Bronze medal – third place	2002 Bangkok	Men's doubles
Southeast Asian Games
Gold medal – first place	1999 Bandar Seri Begawan	Men's doubles
Silver medal – second place	2003 Ho Chim Minh	Men's team
Bronze medal – third place	2007 Nakhon Ratchasima	Men's team
Bronze medal – third place	2001 Kuala Lumpur	Men's team
Bronze medal – third place	1999 Bandar Seri Begawan	Men's team

Tesana Panvisvas (เทศนา พันธ์วิศวาส; born 14 March 1978) is a male badminton player from Thailand. He competed at the 2000 and 2004 Olympic Games. In 2002 Asian Games, and won the men's doubles silver with Pramote Teerawiwatana. He and Teerawiwatana also won the men's doubles gold at the 1999 Southeast Asian Games.

== Career ==
Panvisvas started playing badminton at the age of 12, and then he represented his country at the 1998 Asian Games. Together with Pramote Teerawiwatana in the men's doubles event, they competed at the 2000 Summer Olympics. In the first round, they had beaten the Dutch pair, Dennis Lens and Quinten van Dalm, and defeated by Choong Tan Fook and Lee Wan Wah in the second round. In 2004, they defeated Ashley Brehaut and Travis Denney of Australia in the first round, then were defeated in the round of 16 by Choong Tan Fook and Lee Wan Wah of Malaysia.

== Achievements ==
=== Asian Games ===
Men's doubles
Year	Venue	Partner	Opponent	Score	Result
2002	Gangseo Gymnasium; Busan, South Korea	(Thailand) Pramote Teerawiwatana	(South Korea) Lee Dong-soo (South Korea) Yoo Yong-sung	11–15, 6–15	Silver

=== Asian Championships ===
Men's doubles
Year	Venue	Partner	Opponent	Score	Result
1999	Kuala Lumpur, Malaysia	(Thailand) Pramote Teerawiwatana	(South Korea) Kim Dong-moon (South Korea) Ha Tae-kwon	11–15, 7–15	Bronze
2002	Bangkok, Thailand	(Thailand) Pramote Teerawiwatana	(Indonesia) Sigit Budiarto (Indonesia) Candra Wijaya	16–17, 7–15	Bronze

=== Southeast Asian Games ===
Men's doubles
Year	Venue	Partner	Opponent	Score	Result
1999	Hassanal Bolkiah Sports Complex; Bandar Seri Begawan, Brunei	(Thailand) Pramote Teerawiwatana	(Indonesia) Flandy Limpele (Indonesia) Eng Hian	15–8, 8–15, 15–13	Gold

=== IBF World Grand Prix ===
The World Badminton Grand Prix sanctioned by International Badminton Federation (IBF) from 1983 to 2006.

Men's doubles
Year	Tournament	Partner	Opponent	Score	Result
2001	Thailand Open	(Thailand) Pramote Teerawiwatana	(Indonesia) Sigit Budiarto (Indonesia) Luluk Hadiyanto	7–5, 5–7, 6–8	(silver) Runner-up
2002	China Open	(Thailand) Pramote Teerawiwatana	(Malaysia) Chan Chong Ming (Malaysia) Chew Choon Eng	15–8, 15–8	(gold) Winner
2003	Indonesia Open	(Thailand) Pramote Teerawiwatana	(China) Sang Yang (China) Zheng Bo	17–16, 15–17, 5–15	(silver) Runner-up
