= Badminton at the 2002 Asian Games – Women's singles =

Women's singles at the 2002 Asian Games
- Venue: Gangseo Gymnasium
- Dates: 10–13 October
- Competitors: 16 from 10 nations

Medalists
gold medal	Zhou Mi	China
silver medal	Gong Ruina	China
bronze medal	Wang Chen	Hong Kong
bronze medal	Kim Kyeung-ran	South Korea

The badminton women's singles tournament at the 2002 Asian Games in Busan took place from 10 November to 13 November at Gangseo Gymnasium.

== Schedule ==
All times are Korea Standard Time (UTC+09:00)

Date	Time	Event
Thursday, 10 October 2002	14:00	Preliminaries 1st
Friday, 11 October 2002	16:15	Quarterfinals
Saturday, 12 October 2002	15:00	Semifinals
Sunday, 13 October 2002	15:00	Final

== Results ==
Legend

- r — Retired

Preliminaries 1st
1	Zhou Mi (CHN)	11	11
Eva Katrib (SYR)	2	1
Kanako Yonekura (JPN)	9	11	11
Salakjit Ponsana (THA)	11	3	5
3	Wang Chen (HKG)	11	11
Wong Mew Choo (MAS)	4	7
Huang Chia-chi (TPE)	11	9	1
Jun Jae-youn (KOR)	5	11	11
Long Ying (MAC)	3	2
Kim Kyeung-ran (KOR)	11	11
Ng Mee Fen (MAS)	11	2	2
4	Sujitra Ekmongkolpaisarn (THA)	8	11	1^{r}
Kaori Mori (JPN)	4	6
Li Li (SIN)	11	11
Ling Wan Ting (HKG)	4	5
2	Gong Ruina (CHN)	11	11

Quarterfinals
1	Zhou Mi (CHN)	11	11
Kanako Yonekura (JPN)	4	0
3	Wang Chen (HKG)	11	11
Jun Jae-youn (KOR)	1	0
Kim Kyeung-ran (KOR)	11	11
Ng Mee Fen (MAS)	1	7
Li Li (SIN)	1	5
2	Gong Ruina (CHN)	11	11

Semifinals
1	Zhou Mi (CHN)	11	11
3	Wang Chen (HKG)	1	4
Kim Kyeung-ran (KOR)	3	3
2	Gong Ruina (CHN)	11	11

Finals
1	Zhou Mi (CHN)	11	11
2	Gong Ruina (CHN)	1	1
