= Julia Wong Pei Xian =

Malaysian badminton player

Julia Wong Pei Xian 黄佩娴
Personal information
- Born: 12 September 1987 (age 39) Malacca, Malaysia
- Height: 1.58 m (5 ft 2 in)

Sport
- Country: Malaysia
- Sport: Badminton
- Handedness: Right
- Coached by: Rashid Sidek

Women's singles
- Highest ranking: 16 (19 February 2009)
- BWF profile
Medal record
Women's badminton
Representing Malaysia
Sudirman Cup
| Bronze medal – third place | 2009 Guangzhou | Mixed team |
Commonwealth Games
| Gold medal – first place | 2006 Melbourne | Mixed team |
Southeast Asian Games
| Bronze medal – third place | 2007 Nakhon Ratchasima | Women's singles |
| Bronze medal – third place | 2007 Nakhon Ratchasima | Women's team |
| Bronze medal – third place | 2005 Manila | Women's team |
Asian Junior Championships
| Silver medal – second place | 2005 Jakarta | Girls' team |

Julia Wong Pei Xian (Chinese: 黄佩娴, born 12 September 1987) is a badminton player from Malaysia.

== Career ==
Wong was a champion of the women' singles event at the national championships in 2005, 2007 and 2008, also in the doubles event in 2006. In 2006, she won the women's singles title in Sri Lanka Satellite tournament. Wong played the 2007 BWF World Championships in women's singles, and was defeated in the second round by Maria Kristin Yulianti, of Indonesia, 16–21, 21–14, 21–18. In 2008, she played at the Macau Open Badminton Championships in women's singles, and cruised to the final against Zhou Mi but she lost to her 21–13, 21–19. Before that she did beat Wang Lin and Yip Pui Yin.

== Achievements ==
=== Southeast Asian Games ===
Women's singles
| Year | Venue | Opponent | Score | Result |
|---|---|---|---|---|
| 2007 | Wongchawalitkul University, Nakhon Ratchasima, Thailand | (Indonesia) Maria Kristin Yulianti | 15–21, 22–24 | Bronze |

=== ASEAN University Games ===
Women's singles
| Year | Venue | Opponent | Score | Result | Ref. |
|---|---|---|---|---|---|
| 2008 | Kuala Lumpur Badminton Stadium, Kuala Lumpur, Malaysia | (Indonesia) Fransisca Ratnasari | 19–21, 21–10, 21–15 | Gold | |

=== BWF Grand Prix ===
The BWF Grand Prix has two levels: Grand Prix and Grand Prix Gold. It is a series of badminton tournaments, sanctioned by Badminton World Federation (BWF) since 2007. The World Badminton Grand Prix sanctioned by International Badminton Federation (IBF) since 1983.

Women's singles
| Year | Tournament | Opponent | Score | Result |
|---|---|---|---|---|
| 2009 | India Open | (France) Pi Hongyan | 21–17, 15–21, 14–21 | (silver) Runner-up |
| 2008 | Macau Open | (Hong Kong) Zhou Mi | 13–21, 19–21 | (silver) Runner-up |
| 2006 | Philippines Open | (India) Saina Nehwal | 15–21, 20–22 | (silver) Runner-up |

BWF Grand Prix Gold tournament
BWF Grand Prix tournament

=== BWF International Challenge/Series/Satellite ===
Women's singles
| Year | Tournament | Opponent | Score | Result |
|---|---|---|---|---|
| 2015 | Maribyrnong International | (Australia) Wendy Chen Hsuan-yu | 20–22, 21–19, 21–14 | (gold) Winner |
| 2007 | Malaysia International | (Thailand) Porntip Buranaprasertsuk | 11–21, 19–21 | (silver) Runner-up |
| 2006 | Surabaya Satellite | (Indonesia) Maria Kristin Yulianti | 16–21, 15–21 | (silver) Runner-up |
| 2006 | Cheers Asian Satellite | (Indonesia) Maria Kristin Yulianti | 13–21, 20–22 | (silver) Runner-up |
| 2006 | Sri Lanka Satellite | (Malaysia) Anita Raj Kaur | 21–14, 16–21, 21–19 | (gold) Winner |
| 2005 | Vietnam Satellite | (Thailand) Sujitra Ekmongkolpaisarn | 1–11, 4–11 | (silver) Runner-up |

BWF International Challenge tournament
BWF International Series tournament
