= Kim Kyeung-ran =

South Korean badminton player (born 1977)

Kim Kyeung-ran 김경란
Personal information
- Born: 15 October 1977 (age 49)
- Years active: 1995-2005
- Height: 167 cm (5 ft 6 in)
- Weight: 57 kg (126 lb)
- Spouse: Jang Cheon-woong (m. 2004)

Sport
- Country: South Korea
- Sport: Badminton
- Handedness: Right
- Retired: 2005
- Event: Women's singles and doubles

Women's singles and doubles
- BWF profile
Medal record
Representing South Korea
Sudirman Cup
Gold medal – first place	2003 Eindhoven	Mixed team
Uber Cup
Silver medal – second place	2002 Guangzhou	Women's team
Bronze medal – third place	2000 Kuala Lumpur	Women's team
Asian Games
Bronze medal – third place	2002 Busan	Women's singles
Silver medal – second place	2002 Busan	Women's team

Kim Kyeung-ran (Korean: 김경란; Hanja: 金京兰; born 15 October 1977) is a former South Korea national team female badminton player that associated with Daegyo Noonhi and a badminton coach for several universities and colleges in Korea.

== Career ==
As a badminton player, Kim biggest individual achievement is winning the U.S. Open in 2001 with her partner, Ra Kyung-min. Kim also won a bronze medal in women's singles in 2002 Asian Games in women's singles, losing to Gong Ruina in semifinals. In the same Asian Games, Kim also won the silver medal in team event.

Kim also a member of the 2002 Uber Cup whereas in the final, she won against the world number 1 at that time from China, Zhou Mi in the first single games on a titanic battle of 5 sets with scorelines of 7–4, 7–3, 3–7, 3–7, 7–5. Despite that effort, South Korea fell to China eventually and only grabbed the silver medal.

In the next year, Kim won the 2003 Sudirman Cup against China, ending their 10 years drought of the said championship. In 2003 World Badminton Championships, Kim suffered a major injury by twisting her left knee joint after a jumping smash in the second round match against Aparna Popat of India. This injury causing her to miss a lot of tournaments the next year and also missing the 2004 Olympics in Athens. She fully retired from national team by 2005.

== Post-retirement and coaching ==
During her injuries period in 2004, Kim married with Jang Cheon-woong, another former South Korea national team player. She is also being inducted as Namyangju City public relations ambassador in 2005. In 2011, Daejin University launched the women's badminton team and Kim is one of the head coach of the team. Under her tutelage, Daejin woman's team manage to win the national team event 4 years later. Nowadays, she is the head director of Technist badminton team named "Team Technician", a youth badminton club.

== Achievements ==
=== Asian Games ===
Women's singles
Year	Venue	Opponent	Score	Result
2002	Gangseo Gymnasium; Busan, South Korea	(China) Gong Ruina	3–11, 3–11	Bronze

=== IBF Grand Prix ===
The World Badminton Grand Prix sanctioned by International Badminton Federation (IBF) since 1983.

Women's doubles
Year	Tournament	Partner	Opponent	Score	Result
2001	Korea Open	(South Korea) Ra Kyung-min	(China) Huang Nanyan (China) Yang Wei	13–15, 10–15	(silver) Runner-up
2001	U.S. Open	(South Korea) Ra Kyung-min	(Denmark) Pernille Harder (Denmark) Majken Vange	7–1, 7–0, 7–3	(gold) Winner
