= Badminton at the 2002 Asian Games =

- Venue: Gangseo Gymnasium
- Dates: 6–14 October
- Competitors: 120 from 16 nations

Badminton was contested at the 2002 Asian Games at the Gangseo Gymnasium in Busan, South Korea from 6 October to 14 October 2002. Singles, doubles, and team events were contested for both men and women. Mixed doubles were also contested.

== Schedule ==
P	Preliminary rounds	¼	Quarterfinals	½	Semifinals	F	Final

Event↓/Date →	6th Sun	7th Mon	8th Tue	9th Wed	10th Thu	11th Fri	12th Sat	13th Sun	14th Mon
Men's singles					P	P	¼	½	F
Men's doubles						P	¼	½	F
Men's team	¼	½		F					
Women's singles					P	¼	½	F	
Women's doubles						P	¼	½	F
Women's team	¼	½	F						
Mixed doubles					P	¼	½	F	

== Medalists ==
Event	Gold	Silver	Bronze
Men's singles	Taufik Hidayat; Indonesia	Lee Hyun-il; South Korea	Hendrawan; Indonesia
Men's singles	Taufik Hidayat; Indonesia	Lee Hyun-il; South Korea	Shon Seung-mo; South Korea
Men's doubles	South Korea; Lee Dong-soo; Yoo Yong-sung	Thailand; Pramote Teerawiwatana; Tesana Panvisvas	Malaysia; Chan Chong Ming; Chew Choon Eng
Men's doubles	South Korea; Lee Dong-soo; Yoo Yong-sung	Thailand; Pramote Teerawiwatana; Tesana Panvisvas	Indonesia; Halim Haryanto; Tri Kusharjanto
Men's team	South Korea; Ha Tae-kwon; Jang Young-soo; Kim Dong-moon; Lee Dong-soo; Lee Hyun-il; Lee Jae-jin; Park Tae-sang; Shon Seung-mo; Yim Bang-eun; Yoo Yong-sung	Indonesia; Rony Agustinus; Sigit Budiarto; Halim Haryanto; Hendrawan; Taufik Hidayat; Tri Kusharjanto; Marleve Mainaky; Bambang Suprianto; Nova Widianto; Candra Wijaya	China; Bao Chunlai; Chen Hong; Chen Qiqiu; Lin Dan; Liu Yong; Wang Wei; Xia Xuanze; Zhang Jun; Zhang Wei
Men's team	South Korea; Ha Tae-kwon; Jang Young-soo; Kim Dong-moon; Lee Dong-soo; Lee Hyun-il; Lee Jae-jin; Park Tae-sang; Shon Seung-mo; Yim Bang-eun; Yoo Yong-sung	Indonesia; Rony Agustinus; Sigit Budiarto; Halim Haryanto; Hendrawan; Taufik Hidayat; Tri Kusharjanto; Marleve Mainaky; Bambang Suprianto; Nova Widianto; Candra Wijaya	Malaysia; Mohd Zakry Abdul Latif; Chan Chong Ming; Chang Kim Wai; Chew Choon Eng; Choong Tan Fook; James Chua; Mohd Hafiz Hashim; Lee Tsuen Seng; Ong Ewe Hock; Wong Choong Hann
Women's singles	Zhou Mi; China	Gong Ruina; China	Wang Chen; Hong Kong
Women's singles	Zhou Mi; China	Gong Ruina; China	Kim Kyeung-ran; South Korea
Women's doubles	South Korea; Ra Kyung-min; Lee Kyung-won	China; Gao Ling; Huang Sui	China; Yang Wei; Huang Nanyan
Women's doubles	South Korea; Ra Kyung-min; Lee Kyung-won	China; Gao Ling; Huang Sui	South Korea; Lee Hyo-jung; Hwang Yu-mi
Women's team	China; Dai Yun; Gao Ling; Gong Ruina; Huang Nanyan; Huang Sui; Wei Yili; Yang Wei; Zhang Jiewen; Zhang Ning; Zhou Mi	South Korea; Bae Seung-hee; Hwang Yu-mi; Jun Jae-youn; Kim Kyeung-ran; Kwon Hee-sook; Lee Hae-young; Lee Hyo-jung; Lee Kyung-won; Ra Kyung-min; Shin Ja-young	Hong Kong; Koon Wai Chee; Li Wing Mui; Ling Wan Ting; Siu Ching Man; Wang Chen
Women's team	China; Dai Yun; Gao Ling; Gong Ruina; Huang Nanyan; Huang Sui; Wei Yili; Yang Wei; Zhang Jiewen; Zhang Ning; Zhou Mi	South Korea; Bae Seung-hee; Hwang Yu-mi; Jun Jae-youn; Kim Kyeung-ran; Kwon Hee-sook; Lee Hae-young; Lee Hyo-jung; Lee Kyung-won; Ra Kyung-min; Shin Ja-young	Thailand; Sathinee Chankrachangwong; Sujitra Ekmongkolpaisarn; Salakjit Ponsana; Saralee Thungthongkam
Mixed doubles	South Korea; Kim Dong-moon; Ra Kyung-min	Thailand; Khunakorn Sudhisodhi; Saralee Thungthongkam	China; Chen Qiqiu; Zhang Jiewen
Mixed doubles	South Korea; Kim Dong-moon; Ra Kyung-min	Thailand; Khunakorn Sudhisodhi; Saralee Thungthongkam	Indonesia; Nova Widianto; Vita Marissa

== Medal table ==
Rank	Nation	Gold	Silver	Bronze	Total
1	South Korea (KOR)	4	2	3	9
2	China (CHN)	2	2	3	7
3	Indonesia (INA)	1	1	3	5
4	Thailand (THA)	0	2	1	3
5	Hong Kong (HKG)	0	0	2	2
5	Malaysia (MAS)	0	0	2	2
Totals (6 entries)		7	7	14	28

== Participating nations ==
A total of 120 athletes from 16 nations competed in badminton at the 2002 Asian Games:

- China (19)
- Chinese Taipei (4)
- Hong Kong (10)
- India (2)
- Indonesia (12)
- Japan (11)
- Macau (2)
- Malaysia (17)
- Mongolia (4)
- Philippines (1)
- Singapore (2)
- South Korea (20)
- Sri Lanka (1)
- Syria (1)
- Thailand (12)
- Timor-Leste (2)
