= Indarti Issolina =

Indonesian badminton player

Personal information
- Born: 10 February 1976 (age 50) Purwokerto, Banyumas, Central Java, Indonesia
- Height: 1.68 m (5 ft 6 in)

Sport
- Country: Indonesia
- Sport: Badminton
- Handedness: Right
- BWF profile
Medal record
Women's badminton
Representing Indonesia
World Cup
Bronze medal – third place	1997 Yogyakarta	Women's doubles
Uber Cup
Silver medal – second place	1998 Hong Kong	Women's team
Sudirman Cup
Silver medal – second place	2001 Seville	Mixed team
Bronze medal – third place	1997 Glasgow	Mixed team
Bronze medal – third place	1999 Copenhagen	Mixed team
Asian Games
Bronze medal – third place	1998 Bangkok	Women's team
Asian Championships
Silver medal – second place	1996 Surabaya	Women's doubles
Asian Cup
Silver medal – second place	1996 Seoul	Women's doubles
Bronze medal – third place	1996 Seoul	Mixed doubles
SEA Games
Gold medal – first place	1997 Jakarta	Women's team
Gold medal – first place	1999 Bandar Seri Begawan	Women's team
Silver medal – second place	1997 Jakarta	Women's doubles
Silver medal – second place	1999 Bandar Seri Begawan	Women's doubles
World Junior Championships
Bronze medal – third place	1992 Jakarta	Girls' doubles

Indarti Issolina (born 10 February 1976) is a retired badminton player from Indonesia who specialized in doubles events. She married her compatriot in Indonesia national team, Wahyu Agung Setiawan, in June 2001.

== Achievements ==
=== World Cup ===
Women's doubles
Year	Venue	Partner	Opponent	Score	Result
1997	Among Rogo Sports Hall; Yogyakarta, Indonesia	(Indonesia) Finarsih	(China) Qin Yiyuan (China) Tang Yongshu	4–15, 9–15	Bronze

=== Asian Championships ===
Women's doubles
Year	Venue	Partner	Opponent	Score	Result
1996	Pancasila Hall; Surabaya, Indonesia	(Indonesia) Deyana Lomban	(Indonesia) Eliza Nathanael (Indonesia) Finarsih	8–15, 6–15	Silver

=== Asian Cup ===
Women's doubles
Year	Venue	Partner	Opponent	Score	Result
1996	Olympic Gymnasium No. 2 Seoul, South Korea	(Indonesia) Deyana Lomban	(South Korea) Jang Hye-ock (South Korea) Chung So-young	7–15, 8–15	Silver

Mixed doubles
Year	Venue	Partner	Opponent	Score	Result
1996	Olympic Gymnasium No. 2 Seoul, South Korea	(Indonesia) Sandiarto	(South Korea) Kang Kyung-jin (South Korea) Kim Mee-hyang	12–15, 11–15	Bronze

=== SEA Games ===
Women's doubles
Year	Venue	Partner	Opponent	Score	Result
1997	Asia-Africa hall, Gelora Bung Karno Sports Complex; Jakarta, Indonesia	(Indonesia) Deyana Lomban	(Indonesia) Eliza Nathanael (Indonesia) Zelin Resiana	5–15, 13–15	Silver
1999	Hassanal Bolkiah Sports Complex; Bandar Seri Begawan, Brunei	(Indonesia) Emma Ermawati	(Indonesia) Etty Tantri (Indonesia) Cynthia Tuwankotta	15–17, 6–15	Silver

=== World Junior Championships ===
Girls' doubles
Year	Venue	Partner	Opponent	Score	Result
1992	Istora Senayan; Jakarta, Indonesia	(Indonesia) Mia Audina	(China) Tang Yongshu (China) Yuan Yali	6–15, 9–15	Bronze

=== IBF World Grand Prix ===
The World Badminton Grand Prix has been sanctioned by the International Badminton Federation from 1983 to 2006.

Women's doubles
Year	Tournament	Partner	Opponent	Score	Result
1995	Polish Open	(Indonesia) Emma Ermawati	(Denmark) Mette Pedersen (Denmark) Majken Vange	15–13, 15–8	(gold) Winner
1995	Brunei Open	(Indonesia) Emma Ermawati	(Indonesia) Eny Oktaviani (Indonesia) Nonong Denis Zanati	11–15, 12–15	(silver) Runner-up
1996	German Open	(Indonesia) Deyana Lomban	(Netherlands) Eline Coene (Netherlands) Erica van den Heuvel	18–15, 18–13	(gold) Winner
1996	Hong Kong Open	(Indonesia) Deyana Lomban	(Denmark) Lisbet Stuer-Lauridsen (Denmark) Marlene Thomsen	9–15, 12–15	(silver) Runner-up
1996	Thailand Open	(Indonesia) Deyana Lomban	(Denmark) Lisbet Stuer-Lauridsen (Denmark) Marlene Thomsen	15–9, 15–4	(gold) Winner
1997	Singapore Open	(Indonesia) Deyana Lomban	(China) Ge Fei (China) Gu Jun	4–15, 9–15	(silver) Runner-up
1997	Vietnam Open	(Indonesia) Deyana Lomban	(Indonesia) Eliza Nathanael (Indonesia) Zelin Resiana	11–15, 15–12, 11–15	(silver) Runner-up
1999	Singapore Open	(Indonesia) Carmelita	(China) Huang Nanyan (China) Yang Wei	3–15, 8–15	(silver) Runner-up

Mixed doubles
Year	Tournament	Partner	Opponent	Score	Result
1995	Sydney Open	(Indonesia) Halim Haryanto	(Australia) Peter Blackburn (Australia) Rhonda Cator	17–14, 15–3	(gold) Winner

IBF Grand Prix tournament
IBF Grand Prix Finals tournament

=== IBF Junior International ===
Girls' doubles
Year	Tournament	Partner	Opponent	Score	Result	Ref.
1993	Dutch Junior	(Indonesia) Emma Ermawati	(Japan) Takae Masumo (Japan) Chikako Nakayama	15–9, 15–4	(gold) Winner	
