= Norhasikin Amin =

Malaysian badminton player (born 1975)

Personal information
- Born: 1975 (age 50–51)

Sport
- Country: Malaysia
- Sport: Badminton
- Handedness: Right

Women's & mixed doubles
- Highest ranking: 22 (WD 2001)
- BWF profile
Medal record
Women's badminton
Representing Malaysia
Commonwealth Games
Silver medal – second place	1998 Kuala lumpur	Women's team
Southeast Asian Games
Silver medal – second place	1999 Bandar Seri Begawan	Mixed doubles
Bronze medal – third place	1997 Jakarta	Women's team
Bronze medal – third place	1999 Bandar Seri Begawan	Women's team
Bronze medal – third place	2001 Kuala Lumpur	Women's doubles
Bronze medal – third place	2001 Kuala Lumpur	Women's team
World Junior Championships
Bronze medal – third place	1994 Kuala Lumpur	Girls' doubles

Norhasikin Amin (born c. 1975) is a Malaysian badminton player. She was part of the national team that won the women's team silver medal at the 1998 Commonwealth Games. Amin had collected five medals at the Southeast Asian Games, a silver in the mixed doubles event in 1999, a bronze in the women's doubles in 2001, also another three bronzes in the women's team in 1997, 1999 and 2001.

== Achievements ==
=== Southeast Asian Games ===
Women's doubles
Year	Venue	Partner	Opponent	Score	Result
2001	Malawati Stadium; Selangor, Malaysia	(Malaysia) Wong Pei Tty	(Indonesia) Deyana Lomban (Indonesia) Vita Marissa	7–15, 17–15, 5–15	Bronze

Mixed doubles
Year	Venue	Partner	Opponent	Score	Result
1999	Hassanal Bolkiah Sports Complex; Bandar Seri Begawan, Brunei	(Malaysia) Rosman Razak	(Malaysia) Chew Choon Eng (Malaysia) Chor Hooi Yee	15–12, 6–15, 7–15	Silver

=== World Junior Championships ===
Girls' doubles
Year	Venue	Partner	Opponent	Score	Result	Ref.
1994	Kuala Lumpur Badminton Stadium; Kuala Lumpur, Malaysia	(Malaysia) Chan Chia Fong	(China) Qian Hong (China) Wang Li	4–15, 6–15	Bronze	

=== IBF World Grand Prix ===
The World Badminton Grand Prix sanctioned by International Badminton Federation (IBF) since 1983.

Women's doubles
Year	Tournament	Partner	Opponent	Score	Result
2001	Thailand Open	(Malaysia) Wong Pei Tty	(Indonesia) Eny Erlangga (Indonesia) Jo Novita	4–7, 7–5, 0–7, 2–7	(silver) Runner-up

=== IBF International ===
Women's doubles
Year	Tournament	Partner	Opponent	Score	Result
1994	Mauritius International	(Malaysia) Winnie Lee	(England) Joanne Davies (England) Tanya Woodward	8–15, 10–15	(silver) Runner-up
1998	Malaysia Satellite	(Malaysia) Joanne Quay	(Malaysia) Ishwarii Boopathy (Malaysia) Woon Sze Mei	13–15, 15–11, 17–14	(gold) Winner
2001	Indonesia International	(Malaysia) Wong Pei Tty	(Indonesia) Ninna Ernita (Indonesia) Yunita Tetty	7–15, 17–15, 7–15	(silver) Runner-up
2003	Singapore Sateliite	(Malaysia) Fong Chew Yen	(Singapore) Jiang Yanmei (Singapore) Li Yujia	8–15, 1–15	(silver) Runner-up

Mixed doubles
Year	Tournament	Partner	Opponent	Score	Result
1997	Malaysia International	(Malaysia) Chew Choon Eng	(Malaysia) Rosman Razak (Malaysia) Joanne Quay	9–15, 4–15	(silver) Runner-up
1997	Korea International	(Malaysia) Pang Cheh Chang	(Chinese Taipei) Choi Min-ho (South Korea) Lee Hyo-jung	8–15, 9–15	(silver) Runner-up
1997	Chinese Taipei International	(Malaysia) Pang Cheh Chang	(Chinese Taipei) Huang Yeu-der (Chinese Taipei) Peng Ju-yu	11–15, 1–15	(silver) Runner-up
1998	Malaysia Satellite	(Malaysia) Pang Cheh Chang	(Malaysia) Wong Keng Loo (Malaysia) Ng Soo Mui	15–8, 15–9	(gold) Winner
1999	Malaysia Satellite	(Malaysia) Rosman Razak	(Malaysia) Kantharoopan Ponniah (Malaysia) Wong Pei Tty	6–15, 15–2, 15–10	(gold) Winner
