= Cindana Hartono Kusuma =

Indonesian badminton player

Personal information
- Born: 8 June 1976 (age 50) Jakarta, Indonesia

Sport
- Country: Indonesia
- Sport: Badminton
- Handedness: Right
- Coached by: Retno Kustijah; Liang Qiuxia
- Event: Women's singles

Women's singles
- BWF profile
Medal record
Women's badminton
Representing Indonesia
Sudirman Cup
Bronze medal – third place	1999 Copenhagen	Mixed team
Uber Cup
Silver medal – second place	1998 Hong Kong	Women's team
Asian Games
Bronze medal – third place	1998 Bangkok	Women's team
Southeast Asian Games
Gold medal – first place	1999 Bandar Seri Begawan	Women's singles
Gold medal – first place	1999 Bandar Seri Begawan	Women's team
Gold medal – first place	2001 Kuala Lumpur	Women's team

Cindana Hartono Kusuma (born 8 June 1976) is a retired Indonesian badminton player in the 90s and early 2000s. She won the women's singles gold medal at the 1999 Southeast Asian Games, and was part of the Indonesian women's winning team at the 1999 and 2001 Southeast Asian Games.

== Career ==
Hartono Kusuma managed to steal the attention during the 1997 India Open tournament by defeating the Korean player Lee Soon-deuk with a score of 11–6, 11–4, Kusuma was then trusted to strengthen Indonesian women's team in the 1998 Uber Cup in Hong Kong. Kusuma was again given the trust to compete in the 1999 Southeast Asian Games, where she managed to become the champion in the women's singles by defeating Sujitra Ekmongkolpaisarn with a score of 11–5, 11–2. Kusuma also managed to become the champion in the women's team with her friends by beating Thailand with a 3–0 aggregate score. Kusuma also won the Swiss Open by defeating Yasuko Mizui of Japan in the final with a score of 7–11, 11–6, 13–10. Entering the early 2000s. Hartono Kusuma was predicted as a substitute for Mia Audina in the 2000 Uber Cup who moved to the Netherlands, but Kusuma got injured.

== Achievements ==
=== Southeast Asian Games ===
Women's singles
Year	Venue	Opponent	Score	Result
1999	Hassanal Bolkiah Sports Complex; Bandar Seri Begawan, Brunei	(Thailand) Sujitra Ekmongkolpaisarn	11–5, 11–2	Gold

=== IBF World Grand Prix (2 titles) ===
The World Badminton Grand Prix has been sanctioned by the International Badminton Federation from 1983 to 2006.

Women's singles
Year	Tournament	Opponent	Score	Result
1997	India Open	(South Korea) Lee Soon-deuk	11–6, 11–4	(gold) Winner
1999	Swiss Open	(Japan) Yasuko Mizui	7–11, 11–6, 13–10	(gold) Winner

IBF Grand Prix tournament
IBF Grand Prix Finals tournament
