= Rosman Razak =

Malaysian badminton player and coach

Rosman Abd Razak
Personal information
- Born: Rosman bin Abd Razak; 9 February 1976 (age 50) Negeri Sembilan, Malaysia
- Years active: 1994–2001
- Height: 1.83 m (6 ft 0 in)

Sport
- Country: Malaysia
- Sport: Badminton
- Handedness: Right
- Event: Men's & mixed doubles

Men's & mixed doubles
- BWF profile
Medal record
Men's badminton
Representing Malaysia
Asia Cup
Silver medal – second place	1999 Ho Chi Minh	Men's team
SEA Games
Silver medal – second place	1999 Bandar Seri Begawan	Mixed doubles
Silver medal – second place	1997 Jakarta	Men's team
Silver medal – second place	1999 Bandar Seri Begawan	Men's team

Rosman Razak (born 9 February 1976) is a former badminton player from Malaysia and coach. Currently he is the headcoach of Malaysia in the Women's Doubles department since October 2026. He also was an independent coach for Malaysian men's doubles Ong Yew Sin-Teo Ee Yi and mixed doubles Tan Kian Meng-Lai Pei Jing and Goh Soon Huat-Shevon Jemie Lai.

== Career ==
He is an international doubles player during the late 1990s to early 2000s. He used to partner with Chew Choon Eng and Tan Kim Her.

== Coaching ==
Rosman served as a national doubles coach for almost two decades. Rosman left BAM after the association did not renew his contract at the end of 2020. Then, he joined the Philippines national team. In 2022, he left and returned to coach in his homeland Malaysia.

== Achievements ==
=== SEA Games ===
Mixed doubles
Year	Venue	Partner	Opponent	Score	Result
1999	Hassanal Bolkiah Sports Complex; Bandar Seri Begawan, Brunei	(Malaysia) Norhasikin Amin	(Malaysia) Chew Choon Eng (Malaysia) Chor Hooi Yee	15–12, 6–15, 7–15	Silver

=== IBF International ===
Men's doubles
Year	Tournament	Partner	Opponent	Score	Result
1999	Malaysia Satellite	(Malaysia) Tan Kim Her	(Malaysia) Chang Kim Wai (Malaysia) Lee Chee Leong	15–13, 15–5	(gold) Winner
2001	India Asian Satellite	(Malaysia) Ng Kean Kok	(Thailand) Kitipon Kitikul (Thailand) Sudket Prapakamol	11–15, 15–13, 15–2	(gold) Winner

Mixed doubles
Year	Tournament	Partner	Opponent	Score	Result
1997	Malaysia International	(Malaysia) Joanne Quay	(Malaysia) Chew Choon Eng (Malaysia) Norhasikin Amin	15–9, 15–4	(gold) Winner
1999	Malaysia Satellite	(Malaysia) Norhasikin Amin	(Malaysia) Kantharoopan Ponniah (Malaysia) Wong Pei Tty	6–15, 15–2, 15–10	(gold) Winner
