= Hồ Văn Lợi =

Vietnamese footballer (1970–2025)

Personal information
- Date of birth: 5 April 1970
- Place of birth: Huế, South Vietnam
- Date of death: 12 November 2025 (aged 55)
- Place of death: Ho Chi Minh City, Vietnam
- Height: 1.61 m (5 ft 3 in)
- Position: Midfielder

Youth career
- 1983–1989: Cảng Sài Gòn

Senior career*
Years	Team	Apps	(Gls)
1990–2009	Cảng Sài Gòn		

Managerial career
- 2009–2010: Cảng Sài Gòn (assistant)
- 2013: Xuân Thành Sài Gòn (assistant)
- 2013–2017: PVF Football Academy (youth coach)
- 2022–2023: Lâm Đồng (assistant)
- * Club domestic league appearances and goals

Hồ Văn Lợi (5 April 1970 – 12 November 2025) was a Vietnamese football player and manager. He spent his entire playing career with Vietnamese side TPHCM where he also worked as coach after retiring from playing.

== Career ==
At the age of 17, Lợi joined the Ho Chi Minh City football academy and was eliminated right from the "parking lot" because he was quite short. However, he asked to join the club as a janitor and then got accepted.

Lợi finally joined Ho Chi Minh City FC after being called up by coach Phạm Huỳnh Tam Lang and made his debut in the 1991 season. In the 2001–02 season, he was the top scorer with nine goals, became the first Vietnamese top goalscorer in the V.League. On 11 May 2006, Lợi and Huỳnh Hồng Sơn were temporarily detained in Hanoi and it was decided to prosecute them for bribery in the 2000–01 season Sông Lam Nghệ An case.

== Retirement and death ==
At the end of 2009, Văn Lợi retired at the age of 39. He died as a result of a serious illness on 12 November 2025, at the age of 55.
