= Chor Hooi Yee =

Malaysian badminton player

Chor Hooi Yee 左会漪
Personal information
- Born: 4 May 1979 (age 47)
- Height: 1.54 m (5 ft 1 in)

Sport
- Country: Malaysia
- Sport: Badminton
- Handedness: Right
- Event: Women's & mixed doubles

Women's & mixed doubles
- BWF profile
Medal record
Women's badminton
Representing Malaysia
Commonwealth Games
Silver medal – second place	1998 Kuala lumpur	Women's doubles
Silver medal – second place	1998 Kuala lumpur	Women's team
Southeast Asian Games
Gold medal – first place	1999 Bandar Seri Begawan	Mixed doubles
Bronze medal – third place	1999 Bandar Seri Begawan	Women's team
Bronze medal – third place	1995 Chiang Mai	Mixed doubles
Bronze medal – third place	1995 Chiang Mai	Women's team
Asian Junior Championships
Silver medal – second place	1997 Manila	Girls' doubles

Chor Hooi Yee (born 4 May 1979) is a Malaysian former badminton player. Chor was the women's doubles silver medalist at the 1998 Commonwealth Games in Kuala Lumpur partnered with Lim Pek Siah, also helped the team reach the final and clinch the silver medal. Teamed-up with Chew Choon Eng in the mixed doubles, they claimed the gold medal at the 1999 Southeast Asian Games in Brunei. She previously left the Badminton Association of Malaysia due to nagging injuries and her studies in 2001, and in 2004 she made a comeback to the national squad. Chor educated business in HELP University. She now works as an executive committee member of Cheras club.

== Achievements ==
=== Commonwealth Games ===
Women's doubles
Year	Venue	Partner	Opponent	Score	Result
1998	Kuala Lumpur Badminton Stadium; Kuala Lumpur, Malaysia	(Malaysia) Lim Pek Siah	(England) Donna Kellogg (England) Joanne Goode	8–15, 6–15	Silver

=== Southeast Asian Games ===
Mixed doubles
Year	Venue	Partner	Opponent	Score	Result
1999	Hassanal Bolkiah Sports Complex; Bandar Seri Begawan, Brunei	(Malaysia) Chew Choon Eng	(Malaysia) Rozman Razak (Malaysia) Norhasikin Amin	12–15, 15–6, 15–7	Gold
1995	700th Anniversary Sport Complex; Chiang Mai, Thailand	(Malaysia) Roslin Hashim	(Indonesia) Tri Kusharjanto (Indonesia) Minarti Timur	1–15, 1–15	Bronze

=== Asian Junior Championships ===
Girls' doubles
Year	Venue	Partner	Opponent	Score	Result
1997	Ninoy Aquino Stadium; Manila, Philippines	(Malaysia) Lim Pek Siah	(China) Yang Wei (China) Gao Ling	10–15, 8–15	Silver

=== BWF Grand Prix (1 title, 1 runner-up) ===
The BWF Grand Prix has two levels: Grand Prix and Grand Prix Gold. It is a series of badminton tournaments, sanctioned by Badminton World Federation (BWF) since 2007. The World Badminton Grand Prix sanctioned by International Badminton Federation (IBF) since 1983.

Women's doubles
Year	Tournament	Partner	Opponent	Score	Result
2005	Thessaloniki Grand Prix	(Malaysia) Lim Pek Siah	(England) Gail Emms (England) Donna Kellogg	14–17, 8–15	(silver) Runner-up
1999	Polish Open	(Malaysia) Ang Li Peng	(Ukraine) Victoria Evtushenko (Ukraine) Elena Nozdran	2–15, 15–13, 15–10	(gold) Winner

=== BWF International Challenge/Series (4 titles, 7 runners-up) ===
Women's doubles
Year	Tournament	Partner	Opponent	Score	Result
2007	Bahrain Satellite	(Malaysia) Wong Wai See	(Indonesia) Shendy Puspa Irawati (Indonesia) Meiliana Jauhari	13–21, 14–21	(silver) Runner-up
2004	Irish International	(Malaysia) Lim Pek Siah	(Denmark) Pernille Harder (Denmark) Helle Nielsen	7–15, 6–15	(silver) Runner-up
2004	Scottish International	(Malaysia) Lim Pek Siah	(Poland) Kamila Augustyn (Poland) Nadieżda Kostiuczyk	8–15, 11–15	(silver) Runner-up
2004	Hungarian International	(Malaysia) Lim Pek Siah	(Italy) Agnese Allegrini (Italy) Hui Ding	15–4, 15–3	(gold) Winner
2004	Slovak International	(Malaysia) Lim Pek Siah	(England) Sarah Bok (England) Hayley Connor	15–2, 9–0 Retired	(gold) Winner
2004	Australian International	(Malaysia) Lim Pek Siah	(Australia) Renuga Veeran (Australia) Susan Wang	15–13, 8–15, 12–15	(silver) Runner-up
2004	Western Australia International	(Malaysia) Fong Chew Yen	(Japan) Noriko Okuma (Japan) Miyuki Tai	7–15, 11–15	(silver) Runner-up
1999	Singapore Satellite	(Malaysia) Ang Li Peng	(Indonesia) Angeline De Pauw (Indonesia) Eny Widiowati	15–13, 8–15, 15–5	(gold) Winner
1999	French International	(Malaysia) Ang Li Peng	(China) Qin Yiyuan (China) Gao Ling	0–15, 3–15	(silver) Runner-up
1999	Malaysia Satellite	(Malaysia) Ang Li Peng	(Thailand) Sathinee Chankrachangwong (Thailand) Thitikan Duangsiri	5–15, 10–15	(silver) Runner-up

Mixed doubles
Year	Tournament	Partner	Opponent	Score	Result
2003	Australian International	(Malaysia) Ng Kean Kok	(Malaysia) Ong Ewe Hock (Malaysia) Sutheaswari Mudukasan	15–9, 15–13	(gold) Winner

BWF International Challenge tournament
BWF International Series tournament
BWF Future Series tournament
