= Malawati Stadium =

Indoor arena in Shah Alam, Selangor, Malaysia

Coordinates: 3.0801°N 101.5471°E

Malawati Stadium Stadium Malawati
- Interactive map of Malawati Stadium; Stadium Malawati
- Location: Shah Alam, Selangor, Malaysia
- Owner: Government of Malaysia
- Operator: Shah Alam City Council
- Capacity: 13,000
- Field size: 50 × 50 meters
- Public transit: KD10 Batu Tiga Komuter station SA10 Stadium Shah Alam LRT station

Construction
- Built: 1992-1996
- Opened: 12 May 1998
- Closed: 2025
- Demolished: 1 August 2025

Malawati Stadium (Malay: Stadium Malawati) is an indoor stadium located in Shah Alam, Selangor, Malaysia. The stadium is located beside the Shah Alam Stadium. The stadium has a maximum seated capacity of 13,000 and is capable of housing different events including sports events, warehouse sales, concerts, exhibitions and talks in its fully air conditioned 50 × 50 meters square arena.

== History ==
On 12 May 1998, the stadium was officially opened by Sultan Salahuddin of Selangor. On 1 January 2001, the Shah Alam City Council began taking charge of the maintenance of the stadium. On 1 April 2005, the stadium's management responsibility was fully transferred to the Shah Alam City Council.

== Notable events ==
=== Sport events ===
- World Table Tennis Championship (2016)
- Malaysia Open Badminton Championship (2016)
- 2021–22 Malaysia Purple League group stage (2022)

=== Entertainment events ===
- Major All Stars Season 1
- Konsert Jelajah M. Nasir (2015)
- Russell Peters - Almost Famous World Tour (2015)
- The Script - No Sound Without Silence Tour (2015)
- A-Lin Sonar World Tour Live in Malaysia (2015)
- Selena Gomez - Revival Tour (2016)
- Journey - Eclipse Tour (2017)
- Imagine Dragons - Evolve World Tour (2018)
- Charlie Puth - Voicenotes Tour (2018)
- iKon - iKon 2018 Continue Tour (2018)
- Winner - Winner 2018 Everywhere Tour
- Dewa 19 - Dewa 19 Reunion Live In Malaysia (2019)
- Blackpink - In Your Area World Tour (2019)
- Boyzone - Thank You & Goodnight Tour (2019)
- Monsta X - We Are Here World Tour (2019)
- GFriend - Go Go GFriend! Tour (2019)
- Kim Jae-hwan - 2019 Kim Jae-hwan Fanmeeting [MIN:D] (2019)
- Westlife - The Twenty Tour (2019)
- NU'EST - 2019 NU'EST Concert 'Segno' (2019)
- Super Junior-D&E - The D&E (2019)
- Khalid - Free Spirit Asia Tour (2020)
- MAMAMOO - MY CON World Tour (2023)
- Treasure - Treasure Tour Hello (2023)
- Anuar Zain - Anuar Zain 40th Anniversary Concert (2023)
- Konsert Wings The Rock Emperor - Kuala Lumpur Chapter (2023)
- Konsert Butterfinggers - Transendence (2019)
- Konsert Butterfinggers - Malayneum (2023)

== Notable tournaments ==
- 1998 Sukma Games
- 1998 Commonwealth Games
- 2017 SEA Games

== Transportation ==
The stadium is connected to LRT Kelana Jaya line via Glenmarie LRT station by RapidKL feeder bus T774 LRT Glenmarie ↺ Stadium Shah Alam as well as KTM Port Klang line via Batu Tiga Komuter station by SmartSelangor bus SA02 MBSA / Hentian Bandar Shah Alam ↺ KTM Batu Tiga via Stadium Shah Alam.

The stadium will be connected to LRT Shah Alam line by Stadium Shah Alam LRT station once the line starts operating in 2024, delay to June 2026.
