= Kazakhstan national badminton team =

National badminton team representing Kazakhstan

Kazakhstan
- Association: Kazakhstan Badminton Federation (KBF)
- Confederation: BA (Asia)
- President: Ulan Baizhanov

BWF ranking
- Current ranking: 26 ▲1 (2 January 2024)
- Highest ranking: 26 (2 January 2024)

Sudirman Cup
- Appearances: 9 (first in 1993)
- Best result: Group stage

Asian Mixed Team Championships
- Appearances: 1 (first in 2023)
- Best result: Group stage

Asian Men's Team Championships
- Appearances: 3 (first in 2018)
- Best result: Group stage

Asian Women's Team Championships
- Appearances: 2 (first in 2020)
- Best result: Quarter-finals (2020)

The Kazakhstan national badminton team (Kazakh: Бадминтондан Қазақстан ұлттық құрамасы) represents Kazakhstan in international badminton team competitions. The national team is controlled by the Kazakhstan Badminton Federation (Kazakh: Қазақстан Республикасының Ұлттық бадминтон федерациясы), the governing body for badminton in Kazakhstan.

The Kazakhstani team debuted in the Sudirman Cup in 1989 Sudirman Cup, when the team was playing as part of the Soviet Union national team. The mixed team also played in the 2019 Sudirman Cup and was placed into Group 4 with Greenland and Macau. The Kazakhstani team won both ties and finished in 30th place.

The men's and women's team have participated in the Badminton Asia Team Championships. The best result was when the women's team reached the quarterfinals in the 2020 Badminton Asia Team Championships.

== Competitive record ==
The following tables show the Kazakhstan national badminton team's competitive record in international tournaments.

Key

| CH | RU | 3rd | SF | 4th | QF | #R | GS | Q# | #th | A | NH | WDN | DNQ |

(CH) champion; (RU) runners-up; (3rd) third place; (SF) semi-finalists; (4th) fourth place; (QF) quarter-finalist; (#R) rounds 4, 3, 2, 1; (#th) places 5, 6...; (GS) group stage; (Q#) qualification round; (A) absent; (NH) not held; (WDN) withdrawn; (DNQ) did not qualify.

=== Thomas Cup ===
| Year | 1949 | 1952 | 1955 | 1958 | 1961 | 1964 | 1967 | 1970 | 1973 | 1976 |
| Result | Part of the Soviet Union | | | | | | | | | |
| Year | 1979 | 1982 | 1984 | 1986 | 1988 | 1990 | 1992 | 1994 | 1996 | 1998 |
| Result | Part of the Soviet Union | | | | | | Part of the CIS | WDN | DNQ | |
| Year | 2000 | 2002 | 2004 | 2006 | 2008 | 2010 | 2012 | 2014 | 2016 | 2018 |
| Result | A | | | | | | DNQ | A | | DNQ |
| Year | 2020 | 2022 | 2024 | 2026 | 2028 | 2030 | 2032 | 2034 | 2036 | 2038 |
| Result | DNQ | | | TBD | | | | | | |

=== Uber Cup ===
| Year | 1950–1953 | | | 1957 | 1960 | 1963 | 1966 | 1969 | 1972 | 1975 |
| Result | NH | | | Part of the Soviet Union | | | | | | |
| Year | 1978 | 1981 | 1984 | 1986 | 1988 | 1990 | 1992 | 1994 | 1996 | 1998 |
| Result | Part of the Soviet Union | | | | | | Part of the CIS | DNQ | | |
| Year | 2000 | 2002 | 2004 | 2006 | 2008 | 2010 | 2012 | 2014 | 2016 | 2018 |
| Result | DNQ | A | | | | | | | | |
| Year | 2020 | 2022 | 2024 | 2026 | 2028 | 2030 | 2032 | 2034 | 2036 | 2038 |
| Result | DNQ | | | TBD | | | | | | |

=== Sudirman Cup ===
| Year | 1989 | 1991 | 1993 | 1995 | 1997 | 1999 | 2001 | 2003 | 2005 | 2007 |
| Result | Part of the Soviet Union | | GS | GS | GS | GS | GS | A | GS | A |
| Year | 2009 | 2011 | 2013 | 2015 | 2017 | 2019 | 2021 | 2023 | 2025 | 2027 |
| Result | A | | GS | GS | A | GS | A | DNQ | TBD | |

=== Asian Games ===
==== Men's team ====
| Year | 1962 | 1966 | 1970 | 1974 | 1978 | 1982 | 1986 | 1990 | 1994 | 1998 |
| Result | Part of the Soviet Union | | | | | | | | A | |
| Year | 2002 | 2006 | 2010 | 2014 | 2018 | 2022 | 2026 | 2030 | 2034 | 2038 |
| Result | A | | | | | | R-16 | TBD | | |

==== Women's team ====
| Year | 1962 | 1966 | 1970 | 1974 | 1978 | 1982 | 1986 | 1990 | 1994 | 1998 |
| Result | Part of the Soviet Union | | | | | | | | A | |
| Year | 2002 | 2006 | 2010 | 2014 | 2018 | 2022 | 2026 | 2030 | 2034 | 2038 |
| Result | A | | | | | | R-16 | TBD | | |

=== Asian Team Championships ===
==== Men's team ====
| Year | 1962 | 1965 | 1969 | 1971 | 1976 | 1983 | 1985 | 1987 | 1989 | 1993 |
| Result | Part of the Soviet Union | | | | | | | | | A |
| Year | 2016 | 2018 | 2020 | 2022 | 2024 | 2026 | 2028 | 2030 | 2032 | 2034 |
| Result | A | GS | GS | GS | GS | TBD | | | | |

==== Women's team ====
| Year | 2016 | 2018 | 2020 | 2022 | 2024 | 2026 | 2028 | 2030 | 2032 | 2034 |
| Result | A | | QF | GS | GS | TBD | | | | |

==== Mixed team ====
| Year | 2017 | 2019 | 2023 | 2025 | 2027 | 2029 | 2031 | 2033 | 2035 | 2037 |
| Result | A | | GS | GS | TBD | | | | | |

**Red border color indicates tournament was held on home soil.

== Junior competitive record ==
=== Suhandinata Cup ===
| Year | 2000 | 2002 | 2004 | 2006 | 2007 | 2008 | 2009 | 2010 | 2011 | 2012 |
| Result | A | | | | | | | | | |
| Year | 2013 | 2014 | 2015 | 2016 | 2017 | 2018 | 2019 | 2022 | 2023 | 2024 |
| Result | WDN | A | | | | | GS | A | | |

=== Asian Junior Team Championships ===
==== Boys' team ====
| Year | 1997 | 1998 | 1999 | 2000 | 2001 | 2002 | 2004 | 2005 |
| Result | 2R | 1R | 1R | 2R | A | | | |

==== Girls' team ====
| Year | 1997 | 1998 | 1999 | 2000 | 2001 | 2002 | 2004 | 2005 |
| Result | 1R | A | | | | | | |

==== Mixed team ====
| Year | 2006 | 2007 | 2008 | 2009 | 2010 | 2011 | 2012 | 2013 | 2014 | 2015 |
| Result | 1R | GS | GS | GS | GS | A | | GS | A | GS |
| Year | 2016 | 2017 | 2018 | 2019 | 2023 | 2024 | 2025 | 2026 | 2027 | 2028 |
| Result | GS | GS | GS | A | | GS | GS | GS | TBD | |

=== Central Asian Junior Team Championships ===
==== Mixed team (U17) ====
| Year | 2022 | 2023 | 2024 |
| Result | RU | RU | CH |

==== Mixed team (U15) ====
| Year | 2022 | 2023 | 2024 |
| Result | RU | RU | RU |

**Red border color indicates tournament was held on home soil.

== Players ==
=== Current squad ===
As of 2 January 2024

==== Men's team ====
| Name | DoB/Age | Ranking of event | | |
| Name | DoB/Age | MS | MD | XD |
|---|---|---|---|---|
| Dmitriy Panarin | 8 January 2000 (age 26) | 73 | - | 137 |
| Khaitmurat Kulmatov | 19 February 1996 (age 30) | 614 | 428 | 285 |
| Artur Niyazov | 30 August 1993 (age 33) | 668 | 428 | 518 |
| Jangir Ibrayev | 14 June 2003 (age 23) | 757 | 337 | - |
| Ilya Lysenko | 15 November 2002 (age 23) | 757 | 337 | - |
| Ibray Bayken | 21 July 2006 (age 20) | 619 | 425 | 633 |
| Yevgeniy Yevseyev | 21 August 1997 (age 29) | 757 | 425 | 633 |
| Makhsut Tajibullayev | 3 October 2004 (age 21) | 650 | 941 | 517 |

==== Women's team ====
| Name | DoB/Age | Ranking of event | | |
| Name | DoB/Age | WS | WD | XD |
|---|---|---|---|---|
| Kamila Smagulova | 14 June 1997 (age 29) | 193 | 322 | 137 |
| Aisha Zhumabek | 7 June 2000 (age 26) | 384 | 322 | 285 |
| Romualda Batyrova | 8 June 1992 (age 34) | - | 324 | 459 |
| Dilyara Jumadilova | 20 August 2004 (age 22) | 447 | 324 | 633 |
| Darya Nam | 30 May 2011 (age 15) | - | 502 | - |
| Viktoriya Tkachyova | 9 September 2007 (age 19) | - | 502 | - |
| Diana Namenova | 11 April 2008 (age 18) | 447 | - | 633 |
| Nargiza Rakhmetullayeva | 16 July 2004 (age 22) | 490 | 331 | 517 |
