= Macau national badminton team =

National badminton team representing Macau

Macau
- Association: Badminton Federation of Macau
- Confederation: Badminton Asia
- President: Maria Carvalho

BWF ranking
- Current ranking: 79 ▲5 (2 January 2024)
- Highest ranking: 33 (4 January 2018)

Sudirman Cup
- Appearances: 2 (first in 2017)
- Best result: Group stage

Asian Mixed Team Championships
- Appearances: 1 (first in 2019)
- Best result: Group stage

The Macau national badminton team (Chinese: 澳門國家羽毛球隊; pinyin: Àomén guójiā yǔmáoqiú duì; Jyutping: Ou3 mun4 gwok3 gaa1 jyu5 mou4 kau4 deoi6; Portuguese: Seleção nacional de badminton de Macau) represents Macau, China in international badminton team competitions. Macau participated in the 2019 Badminton Asia Mixed Team Championships, also known as the Tong Yun Kai Cup. They were eliminated in the group stage.

Macau also participated in the 2019 Sudirman Cup and got placed into Group 4 with Kazakhstan and Greenland. They finished in 29th place.

== Competitive record ==
The following tables show the Macau national badminton team's competitive record in international tournaments.

Key

CH	RU	3rd	SF	4th	QF	#R	GS	Q#	#th	A	NH	WDN	DNQ

(CH) champion; (RU) runners-up; (3rd) third place; (SF) semi-finalists; (4th) fourth place; (QF) quarter-finalist; (#R) rounds 4, 3, 2, 1; (#th) places 5, 6...; (GS) group stage; (Q#) qualification round; (A) absent; (NH) not held; (WDN) withdrawn; (DNQ) did not qualify.

=== Thomas Cup ===
Year	1949	1952	1955	1958	1961	1964	1967	1970	1973	1976
Result	A									
Year	1979	1982	1984	1986	1988	1990	1992	1994	1996	1998
Result	A					DNQ				
Year	2000	2002	2004	2006	2008	2010	2012	2014	2016	2018
Result	A	DNQ		A	DNQ	A	DNQ	A		
Year	2020	2022	2024	2026	2028	2030	2032	2034	2036	2038
Result	A			TBD						

=== Uber Cup ===
Year	1950–1953			1957	1960	1963	1966	1969	1972	1975
Result	NH			A						
Year	1978	1981	1984	1986	1988	1990	1992	1994	1996	1998
Result	A					DNQ		A		DNQ
Year	2000	2002	2004	2006	2008	2010	2012	2014	2016	2018
Result	A									
Year	2020	2022	2024	2026	2028	2030	2032	2034	2036	2038
Result	A			TBD						

=== Sudirman Cup ===
Year	1989	1991	1993	1995	1997	1999	2001	2003	2005	2007
Result	A									
Year	2009	2011	2013	2015	2017	2019	2021	2023	2025	2027
Result	A				GS	GS	A		TBD	

=== Asian Games ===
==== Men's team ====
Year	1962	1966	1970	1974	1978	1982	1986	1990	1994	1998
Result	A									
Year	2002	2006	2010	2014	2018	2022	2026	2030	2034	2038
Result	A			1R	A		1R	TBD		

==== Women's team ====
Year	1962	1966	1970	1974	1978	1982	1986	1990	1994	1998
Result	A									
Year	2002	2006	2010	2014	2018	2022	2026	2030	2034	2038
Result	A		WDN	A				TBD		

=== Asian Team Championships ===
==== Men's team ====
Year	1962	1965	1969	1971	1976	1983	1985	1987	1989	1993
Result	A									QF (D2)
Year	2016	2018	2020	2022	2024	2026	2028	2030	2032	2034
Result	A					GS	TBD			

==== Women's team ====
Year	2016	2018	2020	2022	2024	2026	2028	2030	2032	2034
Result	A						TBD			

==== Mixed team ====
Year	2017	2019	2023	2025	2027	2029	2031	2033	2035	2037
Result	A	GS	A	GS	TBD					

=== East Asian Games ===
==== Men's team ====
Year	1993	1997	2009	2013
Result	QF	QF	A	

==== Women's team ====
Year	1993	1997	2009	2013
Result	A		QF	QF

=== FISU World University Games ===
==== Mixed team ====
Year	2007	2011	2013	2015	2017	2021	2025	2029	2023	2037
Result	GS	GS	GS	A			TBD			

=== World University Team Championships ===
==== Mixed team ====
Year	2008	2010	2012	2014	2016	2018
Result	GS	A				

**Red border color indicates tournament was held on home soil.

== Junior competitive record ==
=== Suhandinata Cup ===
Year	2000	2002	2004	2006	2007	2008	2009	2010	2011	2012
Result	GS	A					GS	A	GS	A
Year	2013	2014	2015	2016	2017	2018	2019	2022	2023	2024
Result	A	GS	GS	GS	GS	GS	GS	A		GS
Year	2025	2026								
Result	A	WDN								

=== Asian Junior Team Championships ===
==== Boys' team ====
Year	1997	1998	1999	2000	2001	2002	2004	2005
Result	2R	2R	A	2R	WDN	A		

==== Girls' team ====
Year	1997	1998	1999	2000	2001	2002	2004	2005
Result	A					1R	A	

==== Mixed team ====
Year	2006	2007	2008	2009	2010	2011	2012	2013	2014	2015
Result	A	GS	GS	A				GS	GS	GS
Year	2016	2017	2018	2019	2023	2024	2025	2026	2027	2028
Result	GS	GS	GS	GS	A	GS	GS	GS	TBD	

**Red border color indicates tournament was held on home soil.

== Players ==
=== Current squad ===
As of 2 January 2024

==== Men's team ====
Name	DoB/Age	Ranking of event		
Name	DoB/Age	MS	MD	XD
Pui Pang Fong	13 March 2000 (age 26)	300	-	-
Pui Chi Chon	27 April 2003 (age 23)	400	423	-
Ng Ka Seng	4 January 2003 (age 23)	-	423	-
Leong Iok Chong	8 February 2002 (age 24)	-	236	171
Vong Kok Weng	10 February 2002 (age 24)	-	236	-

==== Women's team ====
Name	DoB/Age	Ranking of event		
Name	DoB/Age	WS	WD	XD
Ng Weng Chi	31 March 1998 (age 28)	-	190	171
Pui Chi Wa	1 February 2005 (age 21)	311	190	-
Ao I Kuan	9 October 1999 (age 26)	-	-	-
Wong Kit Ieng	24 October 1996 (age 29)	-	-	-
Kuan Chi Leng	19 September 1998 (age 28)	-	-	-
