= Cambodia national badminton team =

National badminton team representing Cambodia

Cambodia
- Association: Cambodia Badminton Federation (CBF)
- Confederation: BA (Asia)
- President: Ly Kosal

BWF ranking
- Current ranking: 104 (2 January 2024)
- Highest ranking: 84 (1 July 2011)

Asian Men's Team Championships
- Appearances: 2 (first in 2008)
- Best result: Group stage

Asian Women's Team Championships
- Appearances: 1 (first in 2008)
- Best result: Group stage

The Cambodia national badminton team (Khmer: ក្រុមកីឡាវាយសីជម្រើសជាតិកម្ពុជា។) represents Cambodia in international badminton team competitions. It is controlled by the Cambodia Badminton Federation (Khmer: សហព័ន្ធកីឡាវាយសីកម្ពុជា). Cambodia have never competed in any BWF organized team tournaments.

The Cambodian junior badminton squad competed in the Badminton Asia Junior Championships mixed team event in 2009 and 2010. Cambodia also competes in badminton at the Badminton at the Southeast Asian Games but have yet to win a medal in the team events.

== History ==
Badminton was introduced to Cambodia in the 1950s and the national team was formed shortly after the formation of Cambodia Badminton Federation in 1958. Cambodia has had weak results in badminton compared to its Southeast Asian neighbors. They've yet to win a medal in badminton at the Southeast Asian Games but did however win a bronze medal in mixed doubles at the 1971 Asian Badminton Championships when the country was under civil war.

In 2022, the Cambodian team hired South Korean coach Choi Seung-kook as preparation for the 2023 Southeast Asian Games. In 2023, the Cambodia Badminton Federation received backlash for banning the national teams of Indonesia, Malaysia, Thailand, Philippines, Singapore and Vietnam from competing in the mixed team event at the 2023 Southeast Asian Games.

=== Men's team ===
The Cambodian men's team first competed in the 1962 Asian Games. The team were eliminated in the quarter-finals after losing 5-0 to Malaysia.

Cambodia sent a total of 4 players to compete at the 2007 Southeast Asian Games men's team event. The team lost 3–0 to Malaysia. Cambodia then lost to Thailand in the quarter-finals at the 2009 and 2011 Southeast Asian Games. Cambodia lost to Malaysia again at the 2015 Southeast Asian Games. In 2017, the team lost to Indonesia 3–0 and then lost to Thailand again at the 2019 Southeast Asian Games.

In the 2023 Southeast Asian Games men's team event, the men's team lost 3–0 to Thailand in the quarter-finals.

=== Women's team ===
The Cambodian women's team were scheduled to debut and compete against Malaysia in the quarter-finals at the 2019 Southeast Asian Games but withdrew without any reason given from the national federation. In the 2023 Southeast Asian Games women's team event, the women's team lost 3–0 to Indonesia in the quarter-finals.

=== Mixed team ===
The Cambodian mixed team were the home team in the mixed team event at the 2023 Southeast Games. In the quarter-finals, the team defeated Timor-Leste 3–0. In the semi-finals, the team went head to head against Laos. The team lost their first match in mixed doubles but then came back from trailing 0–1 when Sok Rikreay defeated Manut Phiasoulin in the men's singles match 10–21, 22–20, 21–10. The team won 3–2 over Laos after the Cambodian team claimed victory in women's doubles and singles. In the final, the team won 3–2 against Myanmar and won gold in the mixed team event.

== Competitive record ==
=== Thomas Cup ===
Year	Round	Pos
1949	Part of France	
1952	Part of France	
1955	Did not enter	
1958	Did not enter	
1961	Did not enter	
1964	Did not enter	
1967	Did not enter	
1970	Did not enter	
1973	Did not enter	
1976	Did not enter	
1979	Did not enter	
1982	Did not enter	
1984	Did not enter	
1986	Did not enter	
1988	Did not enter	
1990	Did not enter	
1992	Did not enter	
1994	Did not enter	
1996	Did not enter	
1998	Did not enter	
2000	Did not enter	
2002	Did not enter	
2004	Did not enter	
2006	Did not enter	
2008	Did not qualify	
2010	Did not qualify	
2012	Did not enter	
2014	Did not enter	
2016	Did not enter	
2018	Did not enter	
2020	Did not enter	
2022	Did not enter	
2024	Did not enter	
2026	TBD	
2028	TBD	
2030	TBD	

=== Uber Cup ===
Year	Round	Pos
1957	Did not enter	
1960	Did not enter	
1963	Did not enter	
1966	Did not enter	
1969	Did not enter	
1972	Did not enter	
1975	Did not enter	
1978	Did not enter	
1981	Did not enter	
1984	Did not enter	
1986	Did not enter	
1988	Did not enter	
1990	Did not enter	
1992	Did not enter	
1994	Did not enter	
1996	Did not enter	
1998	Did not enter	
2000	Did not enter	
2002	Did not enter	
2004	Did not enter	
2006	Did not enter	
2008	Did not qualify	
2010	Did not enter	
2012	Did not enter	
2014	Did not enter	
2016	Did not enter	
2018	Did not enter	
2020	Did not enter	
2022	Did not enter	
2024	Did not enter	
2026	TBD	
2028	TBD	
2030	TBD	

=== Sudirman Cup ===
Year	Round	Pos
1989	Did not enter	
1991	Did not enter	
1993	Did not enter	
1995	Did not enter	
1997	Did not enter	
1999	Did not enter	
2001	Did not enter	
2003	Did not enter	
2005	Did not enter	
2007	Did not enter	
2009	Did not enter	
2011	Did not enter	
2013	Did not enter	
2015	Did not enter	
2017	Did not enter	
2019	Did not enter	
2021	Did not enter	
2023	Did not enter	
2025	TBD	
2027	TBD	
2029	TBD	

=== GANEFO ===
==== Men's team ====
Year	Round	Pos
1963	Group stage	
1966	Runners-up	2nd

==== Women's team ====
Year	Round	Pos
1963	Did not enter	
1966	Runners-up	2nd

=== Asian Games ===
==== Men's team ====
Year	Round	Pos
1962	Quarter-finals	7th
1966	Did not enter	
1970	Did not enter	
1974	Did not enter	
1978	Did not enter	
1982	Did not enter	
1986	Did not enter	
1990	Did not enter	
1994	Did not enter	
1998	Did not enter	
2002	Did not enter	
2006	Did not enter	
2010	Did not enter	
2014	Did not enter	
2018	Did not enter	
2022	Did not enter	
2026	TBD	
2030	TBD	
2034	TBD	
2038	TBD	

==== Women's team ====
Year	Round	Pos
1962	Did not enter	
1966	Did not enter	
1970	Did not enter	
1974	Did not enter	
1978	Did not enter	
1982	Did not enter	
1986	Did not enter	
1990	Did not enter	
1994	Did not enter	
1998	Did not enter	
2002	Did not enter	
2006	Did not enter	
2010	Did not enter	
2014	Did not enter	
2018	Did not enter	
2022	Did not enter	
2026	TBD	
2030	TBD	
2034	TBD	
2038	TBD	

=== Asian Team Championships ===
==== Men's team ====
Year	Round	Pos
1962	Did not enter	
1965	Did not enter	
1969	Did not enter	
1971	Withdrew	
1976	Did not enter	
1983	Did not enter	
1985	Did not enter	
1987	Did not enter	
1989	Did not enter	
1993	Did not enter	
2004	Did not enter	
2006	Did not enter	
2008	Group stage	
2010	Group stage	
2012	Did not enter	
2016	Did not enter	
2018	Did not enter	
2020	Did not enter	
2022	Did not enter	
2024	Did not enter	
2026	TBD	
2028	TBD	
2030	TBD	

==== Women's team ====
Year	Round	Pos
2004	Did not enter	
2006	Did not enter	
2008	Group stage	
2010	Did not enter	
2012	Did not enter	
2016	Did not enter	
2018	Did not enter	
2020	Did not enter	
2022	Did not enter	
2024	Did not enter	
2026	TBD	
2028	TBD	
2030	TBD	

==== Mixed team ====
Year	Round	Pos
2017	Did not enter	
2019	Did not enter	
2023	Did not enter	
2025	TBD	
2027	TBD	
2029	TBD	

=== SEA Games ===
==== Men's team ====
Year	Round	Pos
1965	Did not enter	
1971	Quarter-finals	5th
1973	Fourth place	4th
1975	Did not enter	
1977	Did not enter	
1979	Did not enter	
1981	Did not enter	
1983	Did not enter	
1985	Did not enter	
1987	Did not enter	
1989	Did not enter	
1991	Did not enter	
1993	Did not enter	
1995	Quarter-finals	
1997	Did not enter	
1999	Did not enter	
2001	Did not enter	
2003	Did not enter	
2005	Did not enter	
2007	Quarter-finals	
2009	Quarter-finals	
2011	Quarter-finals	
2015	Quarter-finals	
2017	Quarter-finals	
2019	Quarter-finals	
2021	Quarter-finals	
2023	Quarter-finals	
2025	Did not enter	
2027	TBD	
2029	TBD	
2031	TBD	
2033	TBD	

==== Women's team ====
Year	Round	Pos
1965	Did not enter	
1971	Did not enter	
1973	Did not enter	
1975	Did not enter	
1977	Did not enter	
1979	Did not enter	
1981	Did not enter	
1983	Did not enter	
1985	Did not enter	
1987	Did not enter	
1989	Did not enter	
1991	Did not enter	
1993	Did not enter	
1995	Did not enter	
1997	Did not enter	
1999	Did not enter	
2001	Did not enter	
2003	Did not enter	
2005	Did not enter	
2007	Did not enter	
2009	Did not enter	
2011	Did not enter	
2015	Did not enter	
2017	Did not enter	
2019	Quarter-finals	
2021	Did not enter	
2023	Quarter-finals	
2025	Did not enter	
2027	TBD	
2029	TBD	
2031	TBD	
2033	TBD	

==== Mixed team ====
Year	Round	Pos
2023	Champions	1st

=== ASEAN University Games ===
==== Men's team ====
Year	Round	Pos
2004	Did not enter	
2006	Did not enter	
2008	Did not enter	
2010	Did not enter	
2012	Did not enter	
2014	Did not enter	
2016	Did not enter	
2018	Did not enter	
2022	Did not enter	
2024	TBD	

==== Women's team ====
Year	Round	Pos
2004	Did not enter	
2006	Did not enter	
2008	Did not enter	
2010	Did not enter	
2012	Did not enter	
2014	Did not enter	
2016	Did not enter	
2018	Did not enter	
2022	Did not enter	
2024	TBD	

**Red border color indicates tournament was held on home soil.

== Junior competitive record ==
=== Suhandinata Cup ===
Year	Round	Pos
2000	Did not enter	
2002	Did not enter	
2004	Did not enter	
2006	Did not enter	
2007	Did not enter	
2008	Did not enter	
2009	Withdrew	
2010	Did not enter	
2011	Did not enter	
2012	Did not enter	
2013	Did not enter	
2014	Did not enter	
2015	Did not enter	
2016	Did not enter	
2017	Did not enter	
2018	Did not enter	
2019	Did not enter	
2022	Did not enter	
2023	Did not enter	
2024	TBD	

=== Asian Junior Team Championships ===
==== Boys' team ====
Year	Round	Pos
1997	Round of 16	
1998	Round of 16	
1999	Round of 16	
2000	Round of 16	
2001	Round of 16	
2002	Did not enter	
2004	Did not enter	
2005	Did not enter	

==== Girls' team ====
Year	Round	Pos
1997	Did not enter	
1998	Did not enter	
1999	Did not enter	
2000	Did not enter	
2001	Did not enter	
2002	Did not enter	
2004	Did not enter	
2005	Did not enter	

==== Mixed team ====
Year	Round	Pos
2006	Group stage	
2007	Group stage	
2008	Did not enter	
2009	Group stage	
2010	Group stage	
2011	Did not enter	
2012	Did not enter	
2013	Did not enter	
2014	Did not enter	
2015	Did not enter	
2016	Did not enter	
2017	Did not enter	
2018	Did not enter	
2019	Did not enter	
2023	Did not enter	
2024	TBD	
2025	TBD	

=== ASEAN School Games ===
==== Boys' team ====
Year	Round	Pos
2009	Did not enter	
2010	Did not enter	
2011	Did not enter	
2012	Did not enter	
2013	Did not enter	
2014	Did not enter	
2015	Did not enter	
2016	Group stage	
2017	Group stage	
2018	Group stage	
2019	Group stage	

==== Girls' team ====
Year	Round	Pos
2009	Did not enter	
2010	Did not enter	
2011	Did not enter	
2012	Did not enter	
2013	Did not enter	
2014	Did not enter	
2015	Did not enter	
2016	Did not enter	
2017	Did not enter	
2018	Group stage	
2019	Group stage	

**Red border color indicates tournament was held on home soil.

== Staff ==
The following list shows the coaching staff for the Cambodian national badminton team.

Name	Role
(Cambodia) Chheth Samean	Coach
(South Korea) Choi Seung-kook	Assistant coach

== Players ==
=== Current squad ===
As of 2 January 2024

==== Men's team ====
Name	DoB/Age	Ranking of event		
Name	DoB/Age	MS	MD	XD
Sok Rikreay	9 January 2003 (age 22)	306	328	-
Vannthoun Vath	22 October 2001 (age 24)	-	328	-
Heng Mengly	9 December 1999 (age 26)	-		-
Sorn Liza	11 August 2004 (age 21)	-	-	-
Heng Mengleap	12 November 2003 (age 22)	-	-	-
Phal Risatsya	22 November 2003 (age 22)	-	-	-
Yam Samnang	10 April 2005 (age 20)	-	-	-
Reach Sophanith	13 November 2006 (age 19)	-	-	-

==== Women's team ====
Name	DoB/Age	Ranking of event		
Name	DoB/Age	WS	WD	XD
Phon Chenda	3 March 2000 (age 25)	-	-	-
Sok Somalyta	25 August 2005 (age 20)	-	-	-
Rathanisa Ker	15 March 1996 (age 29)	-	-	-
Rany Vandy	3 November 1994 (age 31)	-	-	-
Ker Pechhoravy	24 May 1995 (age 30)	-	-	-
Ros Somonea	7 January 2004 (age 21)	-	-	-
Seavty Teav	15 October 2001 (age 24)	-	-	-
Heang Leakhena	2 June 2003 (age 22)	-	-	-

=== Previous squads ===
==== Southeast Asian Games ====
- Men's team: 2021, 2023
- Women's team: 2023
- Mixed team: 2023
