= Timor-Leste national badminton team =

Timor-Leste
- Association: Federação de Badminton de Timor Leste (FBTL)
- Confederation: BA (Asia)
- President: Francisco Yong

BWF ranking
- Current ranking: 99 ▲12 (2 January 2024)
- Highest ranking: 99 (2 January 2024)

The Timor-Leste national badminton team (Portuguese: Equipa nacional de badminton de Timor-Leste; Tetum: Ekipa badminton nasionál Timor-Leste) represents East Timor in international badminton competitions. While badminton is not a popular sport in East Timor, the nation has competed in tournaments such as the Asian Games and the BWF World Junior Championships.

East Timor has also made its presence in para-badminton. National para-badminton player, Anibal Gusmao Pereira was the first Timorese para-badminton player to play in the Asian Games. According to Pereira, badminton is highly unrecognized in East Timor and locals enjoy football more than badminton.

== History ==
Although East Timor used to be part of Indonesia which is one of the countries with a prestigious history in badminton, the sport was unrecognized in the region until 2002. The Timor Leste Badminton Federation was then established in 2002 and sent its first two athletes to compete at the 2002 Asian Games, the two being Francisco Yong and Tes Fac Sing. The Timor Leste Badminton Federation took part in partnering with Badminton Asia and the Badminton World Federation and organized the Badminton for Peace campaign (Tetum: Badminton ba Dame) to teach peace culture to young people in Timor-Leste by facilitating dialogue and social cohesion as well as to promote the sport in the country. In 2017, East Timor sent its junior players to the PB Djarum training camp as preparation for the 2017 BWF World Junior Championships in Yogyakarta.

=== Mixed team ===
The Timorese mixed team competed in the mixed team event at the 2023 SEA Games. In the quarter-final stage, the team lost 3–0 to hosts Cambodia.

== Competitive record ==
=== Thomas Cup ===
Year	Round	Pos
1949	Part of Portugal	
1952	Part of Portugal	
1955	Part of Portugal	
1958	Part of Portugal	
1961	Part of Portugal	
1964	Part of Portugal	
1967	Part of Portugal	
1970	Part of Portugal	
1973	Part of Portugal	
1976	Part of Indonesia	
1979	Part of Indonesia	
1982	Part of Indonesia	
1984	Part of Indonesia	
1986	Part of Indonesia	
1988	Part of Indonesia	
1990	Part of Indonesia	
1992	Part of Indonesia	
1994	Part of Indonesia	
1996	Part of Indonesia	
1998	Part of Indonesia	
2000	Part of Indonesia	
2002	Part of Indonesia	
2004	Did not enter	
2006	Did not enter	
2008	Did not enter	
2010	Did not enter	
2012	Did not enter	
2014	Did not enter	
2016	Did not enter	
2018	Did not enter	
2020	Did not enter	
2022	Did not enter	
2024	TBD	
2026	TBD	
2028	TBD	
2030	TBD	

=== Uber Cup ===
Year	Round	Pos
1957	Part of Portugal	
1960	Part of Portugal	
1963	Part of Portugal	
1966	Part of Portugal	
1969	Part of Portugal	
1972	Part of Portugal	
1975	Part of Portugal	
1978	Part of Indonesia	
1981	Part of Indonesia	
1984	Part of Indonesia	
1986	Part of Indonesia	
1988	Part of Indonesia	
1990	Part of Indonesia	
1992	Part of Indonesia	
1994	Part of Indonesia	
1996	Part of Indonesia	
1998	Part of Indonesia	
2000	Part of Indonesia	
2002	Part of Indonesia	
2004	Did not enter	
2006	Did not enter	
2008	Did not enter	
2010	Did not enter	
2012	Did not enter	
2014	Did not enter	
2016	Did not enter	
2018	Did not enter	
2020	Did not enter	
2022	Did not enter	
2024	TBD	
2026	TBD	
2028	TBD	
2030	TBD	

=== Sudirman Cup ===
Year	Round	Pos
1989	Part of Indonesia	
1991	Part of Indonesia	
1993	Part of Indonesia	
1995	Part of Indonesia	
1997	Part of Indonesia	
1999	Part of Indonesia	
2001	Part of Indonesia	
2003	Did not enter	
2005	Did not enter	
2007	Did not enter	
2009	Did not enter	
2011	Did not enter	
2013	Did not enter	
2015	Did not enter	
2017	Did not enter	
2019	Did not enter	
2021	Did not enter	
2023	Did not enter	
2025	TBD	
2027	TBD	
2029	TBD	

=== Asian Games ===
==== Men's team ====
Year	Round	Pos
1962	Part of Portugal	
1966	Part of Portugal	
1970	Part of Portugal	
1974	Part of Portugal	
1978	Part of Indonesia	
1982	Part of Indonesia	
1986	Part of Indonesia	
1990	Part of Indonesia	
1994	Part of Indonesia	
1998	Part of Indonesia	
2002	Did not enter	
2006	Did not enter	
2010	Did not enter	
2014	Did not enter	
2018	Did not enter	
2022	Did not enter	
2026	TBD	
2030	TBD	
2034	TBD	
2038	TBD	

==== Women's team ====
Year	Round	Pos
1962	Part of Portugal	
1966	Part of Portugal	
1970	Part of Portugal	
1974	Part of Portugal	
1978	Part of Indonesia	
1982	Part of Indonesia	
1986	Part of Indonesia	
1990	Part of Indonesia	
1994	Part of Indonesia	
1998	Part of Indonesia	
2002	Did not enter	
2006	Did not enter	
2010	Did not enter	
2014	Did not enter	
2018	Did not enter	
2022	Did not enter	
2026	TBD	
2030	TBD	
2034	TBD	
2038	TBD	

=== Asian Team Championships ===
==== Men's team ====
Year	Round	Pos
1962	Part of Portugal	
1965	Part of Portugal	
1969	Part of Portugal	
1971	Part of Portugal	
1976	Part of Indonesia	
1983	Part of Indonesia	
1985	Part of Indonesia	
1987	Part of Indonesia	
1989	Part of Indonesia	
1993	Part of Indonesia	
2004	Did not enter	
2006	Did not enter	
2008	Did not enter	
2010	Did not enter	
2012	Did not enter	
2016	Did not enter	
2018	Did not enter	
2020	Did not enter	
2022	Did not enter	
2024	TBD	
2026	TBD	
2028	TBD	
2030	TBD	

==== Women's team ====
Year	Round	Pos
2004	Did not enter	
2006	Did not enter	
2008	Did not enter	
2010	Did not enter	
2012	Did not enter	
2016	Did not enter	
2018	Did not enter	
2020	Did not enter	
2022	Did not enter	
2024	TBD	
2026	TBD	
2028	TBD	
2030	TBD	

==== Mixed team ====
Year	Round	Pos
2017	Did not enter	
2019	Did not enter	
2023	Did not enter	
2025	TBD	
2027	TBD	
2029	TBD	

=== SEA Games ===
==== Men's team ====
Year	Round	Pos
1965	Part of Portugal	
1971	Part of Portugal	
1973	Part of Portugal	
1975	Part of Portugal	
1977	Part of Indonesia	
1979	Part of Indonesia	
1981	Part of Indonesia	
1983	Part of Indonesia	
1985	Part of Indonesia	
1987	Part of Indonesia	
1989	Part of Indonesia	
1991	Part of Indonesia	
1993	Part of Indonesia	
1995	Part of Indonesia	
1997	Part of Indonesia	
1999	Part of Indonesia	
2001	Part of Indonesia	
2003	Did not enter	
2005	Did not enter	
2007	Did not enter	
2009	Did not enter	
2011	Did not enter	
2015	Did not enter	
2017	Did not enter	
2019	Did not enter	
2021	Did not enter	
2023	Did not enter	
2025	Did not enter	
2027	TBD	
2029	TBD	
2031	TBD	
2033	TBD	

==== Women's team ====
Year	Round	Pos
1965	Part of Portugal	
1971	Part of Portugal	
1973	Part of Portugal	
1975	Part of Portugal	
1977	Part of Indonesia	
1979	Part of Indonesia	
1981	Part of Indonesia	
1983	Part of Indonesia	
1985	Part of Indonesia	
1987	Part of Indonesia	
1989	Part of Indonesia	
1991	Part of Indonesia	
1993	Part of Indonesia	
1995	Part of Indonesia	
1997	Part of Indonesia	
1999	Part of Indonesia	
2001	Part of Indonesia	
2003	Did not enter	
2005	Did not enter	
2007	Did not enter	
2009	Did not enter	
2011	Did not enter	
2015	Did not enter	
2017	Did not enter	
2019	Did not enter	
2021	Did not enter	
2023	Did not enter	
2025	Did not enter	
2027	TBD	
2029	TBD	
2031	TBD	
2033	TBD	

==== Mixed team ====
Year	Round	Pos
2023	Quarter-finals	5th

=== ASEAN University Games ===
==== Men's team ====
Year	Round	Pos
2004	Did not enter	
2006	Did not enter	
2008	Did not enter	
2010	Did not enter	
2012	Did not enter	
2014	Did not enter	
2016	Did not enter	
2018	Did not enter	
2022	Did not enter	
2024	TBD	

==== Women's team ====
Year	Round	Pos
2004	Did not enter	
2006	Did not enter	
2008	Did not enter	
2010	Did not enter	
2012	Did not enter	
2014	Did not enter	
2016	Did not enter	
2018	Did not enter	
2022	Did not enter	
2024	TBD	

**Red border color indicates tournament was held on home soil.

== Junior competitive record ==
=== Suhandinata Cup ===
Year	Round	Pos
2000	Part of Indonesia	
2002	Did not enter	
2004	Did not enter	
2006	Did not enter	
2007	Did not enter	
2008	Did not enter	
2009	Did not enter	
2010	Did not enter	
2011	Did not enter	
2012	Did not enter	
2013	Did not enter	
2014	Did not enter	
2015	Did not enter	
2016	Did not enter	
2017	Did not enter	
2018	Did not enter	
2019	Did not enter	
2022	Did not enter	
2023	Did not enter	
2024	TBD	

=== Asian Junior Team Championships ===
==== Boys' team ====
Year	Round	Pos
1997	Part of Indonesia	
1998	Part of Indonesia	
1999	Part of Indonesia	
2000	Part of Indonesia	
2001	Part of Indonesia	
2002	Did not enter	
2004	Did not enter	
2005	Did not enter	

==== Girls' team ====
Year	Round	Pos
1997	Part of Indonesia	
1998	Part of Indonesia	
1999	Part of Indonesia	
2000	Part of Indonesia	
2001	Part of Indonesia	
2002	Did not enter	
2004	Did not enter	
2005	Did not enter	

==== Mixed team ====
Year	Round	Pos
2006	Did not enter	
2007	Did not enter	
2008	Did not enter	
2009	Did not enter	
2010	Did not enter	
2011	Did not enter	
2012	Did not enter	
2013	Did not enter	
2014	Did not enter	
2015	Did not enter	
2016	Did not enter	
2017	Did not enter	
2018	Did not enter	
2019	Did not enter	
2023	Did not enter	
2024	TBD	
2025	TBD	

=== ASEAN School Games ===
==== Boys' team ====
Year	Round	Pos
2009	Did not enter	
2010	Did not enter	
2011	Did not enter	
2012	Did not enter	
2013	Did not enter	
2014	Did not enter	
2015	Did not enter	
2016	Did not enter	
2017	Did not enter	
2018	Did not enter	
2019	Did not enter	

==== Girls' team ====
Year	Round	Pos
2009	Did not enter	
2010	Did not enter	
2011	Did not enter	
2012	Did not enter	
2013	Did not enter	
2014	Did not enter	
2015	Did not enter	
2016	Did not enter	
2017	Did not enter	
2018	Did not enter	
2019	Did not enter	

**Red border color indicates tournament was held on home soil.

== Players ==
=== Current squad ===
As of 2 January 2024

==== Men's team ====
Name	DoB/Age	Ranking of event		
Name	DoB/Age	MS	MD	XD
Raymond Sing	27 September 1996 (age 29)	233	328	335
Mourinho Zefi	17 May 2004 (age 21)	622	328	-
Zidane Evaldo Zefi	19 June 2008 (age 17)	-	-	-
Cristiano Galhos	1 April 2006 (age 19)	-	-	-
Alberto Gusmão	29 July 2007 (age 18)	-	-	-

==== Women's team ====
Name	DoB/Age	Ranking of event		
Name	DoB/Age	WS	WD	XD
Zoraida Dela Torre	8 June 2005 (age 20)	532	-	335
Hulda Meredith	23 February 2002 (age 23)	-	-	-
Rihana da Costa Oliveira	27 September 2006 (age 19)	-	-	-
Maria Fatima	5 April 2007 (age 18)	-	-	-
Jesia Amaral	26 July 2009 (age 16)	-	-	-

=== Previous squads ===
==== Southeast Asian Games ====
- Mixed team: 2023
