= 1997 Asian Junior Badminton Championships – Boys' team =

Badminton championship in Manila, Philippines

Boys' team at the 1997 Asian Junior Badminton Championships
- Venue: Ninoy Aquino Stadium
- Location: Manila, Philippines
- Dates: 7–9 April 1997

The boys' team tournament at the 1997 Asian Junior Badminton Championships took place from 7 to 9 April 1997 at the Ninoy Aquino Stadium in Manila, Philippines. A total of 24 teams competed in this event.

== Results ==
=== Bracket ===
Round of 32
Singapore	w/o
Iran
Vietnam	3
Syria	1
Nepal	2
Cambodia	3
Myanmar	3
Bangladesh	0

Round of 16
China	3
Singapore	0
India	3
Macau	0
South Korea	3
Vietnam	0
Philippines	w/o
Pakistan
Malaysia	3
Cambodia	0
Chinese Taipei	3
Sri Lanka	0
Indonesia	3
Myanmar	0
Kazakhstan	0
Japan	3

Quarter-finals
China	3
India	0
South Korea	3
Philippines	0
Malaysia	3
Chinese Taipei	1
Indonesia	3
Japan	1

Semi-finals
China	5
South Korea	0
Malaysia	2
Indonesia	3

Final
China	3
Indonesia	2

=== Final ===
China
3
Ninoy Aquino Stadium
9 April 1997

Indonesia
2

			1	2	3
1	(China) (Indonesia)	Xia Xuanze; Taufik Hidayat	12; 15	11; 15
2	(China) (Indonesia)	Chen Hong; Ignatius Rudy	7; 15	15; 10	15; 8
3	(China) (Indonesia)	Cheng Rui; Hartawan	15; 5	13; 18	15; 2
4	(China) (Indonesia)	Chen Hong / Xia Xuanze; Luluk Hadiyanto / Mohammed Noor Misuari	4; 15	10; 15
5	(China) (Indonesia)	Cheng Rui / Jiang Shan; Denny Setiawan / Alvent Yulianto	15; 7	18; 14
