= 2000 Asian Junior Badminton Championships – Boys' team =

Badminton championship in Kyoto, Japan

Boys' team at the 2000 Asian Junior Badminton Championships
- Venue: Nishiyama Park Gymnasium
- Location: Kyoto, Japan
- Dates: 21–24 July 2000

The boys' team tournament at the 2000 Asian Junior Badminton Championships took place from 21 to 24 July 2000 at the Nishiyama Park Gymnasium in Kyoto, Japan. A total of 17 countries competed in this event.

== Results ==
=== Bracket ===
Round of 32
Singapore	3
Iran	0

Round of 16
Indonesia	3
Cambodia	0
Myanmar	0
Chinese Taipei	3
South Korea	3
Macau	0
Japan	3
Sri Lanka	0
Singapore	0
Thailand	3
Maldives	0
Malaysia	3
Kazakhstan	0
India	3
Bangladesh	0
China	3

Quarter-finals
Indonesia	3
Chinese Taipei	0
South Korea	3
Japan	2
Thailand	1
Malaysia	3
India	0
China	3

Semi-finals
Indonesia	3
South Korea	0
Malaysia	1
China	3

Final
Indonesia	0
China	3

=== Round of 32 ===
Singapore
3
Nishiyama Park Gymnasium
21 July 2000

Iran
0

			1	2	3
1	(Singapore) (Iran)	Hendra Wijaya; Kaveh Mehrabi	15; 5	15; 6
2	(Singapore) (Iran)	Kendrick Lee; Mehdi Karimi	15; 2	15; 7
3	(Singapore) (Iran)	Gerald Ho; Mehdi Shorjeh	15; 7	15; 10
4	(Singapore) (Iran)	Kendrick Lee / Hendra Wijaya; Mehdi Karimi / Ali Shahhosseini				not played
5	(Singapore) (Iran)	Gerald Ho / Wayne Kuo; Kaveh Mehrabi / Said Cheraghchi				not played

=== Round of 16 ===
Indonesia
3
Nishiyama Park Gymnasium
21 July 2000

Cambodia
0

			1	2	3
1	(Indonesia) (Cambodia)	Sony Dwi Kuncoro; Saviak Khet Abdol	15; 1	15; 4
2	(Indonesia) (Cambodia)	Anggun Nugroho; Sam Ratana	15; 4	15; 3
3	(Indonesia) (Cambodia)	Markis Kido; Deng Titrasmey	15; 5	15; 7
4	(Indonesia) (Cambodia)	Yan Peter / Tri Heru Pamungkas; Sam Ratana / Long Titsidy				not played
5	(Indonesia) (Cambodia)	Hendra Aprida Gunawan / Bambang Saifulloh; Saviak Khet Abdol / Deng Titrasmey				not played

Chinese Taipei
3
Nishiyama Park Gymnasium
21 July 2000

Myanmar
0

			1	2	3
1	(Chinese Taipei) (Myanmar)	Liao Sheng-shiun; Zin Latt	15; 5	15; 6
2	(Chinese Taipei) (Myanmar)	Chin Sheng-ming; Thet Lwin Myint	15; 1	15; 1
3	(Chinese Taipei) (Myanmar)	Hsieh Yu-hsing; Khaing Kyaw Soe	15; 5	15; 5
4	(Chinese Taipei) (Myanmar)	Hsu Wei-hung / Liu Chia-cheng; Zin Latt / Htun Htun Oo				not played
5	(Chinese Taipei) (Myanmar)	Tien Kuo-chung / Tsai Chia-hsin; Khaing Kyaw Soe / Thet Lwin Myint				not played

South Korea
3
Nishiyama Park Gymnasium
21 July 2000

Macau
0

			1	2	3
1	(South Korea) (Macau)	Jang Young-soo; Liao Ching Fung	15; 2	15; 0
2	(South Korea) (Macau)	Lee Seung-yoon; Hong Kuok Hei	15; 4	15; 1
3	(South Korea) (Macau)	Jung Jae-sung; Kuok Weng Sang	15; 2	15; 0
4	(South Korea) (Macau)	Jung Jin-chul / Kim Sang-soo; Hong Kuok Hei / Wong Io Meng				not played
5	(South Korea) (Macau)	Jung Jae-sung / Lee Jae-jin; Liao Ching Fung / Kuok Weng Sang				not played

Japan
3
Nishiyama Park Gymnasium
21 July 2000

Sri Lanka
0

			1	2	3
1	(Japan) (Sri Lanka)	Shoji Sato; Naveen Perera	15; 2	15; 0
2	(Japan) (Sri Lanka)	Sho Sasaki; Devaka Ekanayake	15; 4	15; 1
3	(Japan) (Sri Lanka)	Yoshinaga Enomoto; Prabath Kumarasinghe	15; 2	15; 0
4	(Japan) (Sri Lanka)	Naoki Kawamae / Yusuke Shinkai; Devaka Ekanayake / Prasad Sylvester				not played
5	(Japan) (Sri Lanka)	Sho Sasaki / Shoji Sato; Edirimuni Karunaratne / Naveen Perera				not played

Thailand
3
Nishiyama Park Gymnasium
21 July 2000

Singapore
0

			1	2	3
1	(Thailand) (Singapore)	Jackaphan Thanat; Hendra Wijaya	8; 15	15; 5	15; 11
2	(Thailand) (Singapore)	Noppanon Wuthiwikaikarn; Kendrick Lee	6; 15	15; 11	15; 13
3	(Thailand) (Singapore)	Parnuvat Ngernsrisuk; Gerald Ho	15; 11	15; 13
4	(Thailand) (Singapore)	Vasin Nilyoke / Noppanon Wuthiwikaikarn; Kendrick Lee / Hendra Wijaya				not played
5	(Thailand) (Singapore)	Jackaphan Thanat / Parnuvat Ngernsrisuk; Gerald Ho / Wayne Kuo				not played

Malaysia
3
Nishiyama Park Gymnasium
21 July 2000

Maldives
0

			1	2	3
1	(Malaysia) (Maldives)	Lee Chong Wei; Ishfan Mohamed	15; 0	15; 0
2	(Malaysia) (Maldives)	Kuan Beng Hong; Hassan Afsheen Shaheem	15; 0	15; 2
3	(Malaysia) (Maldives)	Yogendran Khrishnan; Ibrahim Shamiu	15; 1	15; 0
4	(Malaysia) (Maldives)	Mohd Fairuzizuan Mohd Tazari / Lin Woon Fui; Ishfan Mohamed / Hassan Afsheen Shaheem				not played
5	(Malaysia) (Maldives)	Gan Teik Chai / Tan Chin Lee; Ibrahim Shamiu / Nasheeu Sharafuddeen				not played

India
3
Nishiyama Park Gymnasium
21 July 2000

Kazakhstan
0

			1	2	3
1	(India) (Kazakhstan)	Anup Sridhar; Anuar Musafirov	15; 2	15; 9
2	(India) (Kazakhstan)	S. D. S. Krishna; Alexander Zverev	15; 0	15; 2
3	(India) (Kazakhstan)	Nishad Dravid; Mikhail Zakharov	15; 1	15; 9
4	(India) (Kazakhstan)	Amar Mohite / Ajit Phatak; Anuar Musafirov / Alexander Zverev				not played
5	(India) (Kazakhstan)	S. D. S. Krishna / Anup Sridhar; Zhanbolat Bekenov / Mikhail Zakharov				not played

China
3
Nishiyama Park Gymnasium
21 July 2000

Bangladesh
0

			1	2	3
1	(China) (Bangladesh)	Zhu Weilun; Maruf Alam	15; 2	15; 1
2	(China) (Bangladesh)	Lin Dan; Mohammed Jabed Mostafa	15; 4	15; 1
3	(China) (Bangladesh)	Bao Chunlai; Ahsan Habib Parash	15; 5	15; 3
4	(China) (Bangladesh)	Cao Chen / Xie Zhongbo; Maruf Alam / Mohammad Ohiduzaman Razu				not played
5	(China) (Bangladesh)	Sang Yang / Zheng Bo; Mohammed Jabed Mostafa / Ahsan Habib Parash				not played

=== Quarter-finals ===
Indonesia
3
Nishiyama Park Gymnasium
22 July 2000

Chinese Taipei
0

			1	2	3
1	(Indonesia) (Chinese Taipei)	Sony Dwi Kuncoro; Liao Sheng-shiun	15; 3	15; 3
2	(Indonesia) (Chinese Taipei)	Anggun Nugroho; Chin Sheng-ming	15; 3	15; 3
3	(Indonesia) (Chinese Taipei)	Markis Kido; Hsieh Yu-hsing	15; 13	15; 12
4	(Indonesia) (Chinese Taipei)	Yan Peter / Tri Heru Pamungkas; Hsu Wei-hung / Liu Chia-cheng				not played
5	(Indonesia) (Chinese Taipei)	Hendra Aprida Gunawan / Bambang Saifulloh; Tien Kuo-chung / Tsai Chia-hsin				not played

South Korea
3
Nishiyama Park Gymnasium
22 July 2000

Japan
2

			1	2	3
1	(South Korea) (Japan)	Jang Young-soo; Shoji Sato	15; 11	15; 11
2	(South Korea) (Japan)	Lee Seung-yoon; Sho Sasaki	9; 15	15; 5	8; 15
3	(South Korea) (Japan)	Jung Jae-sung; Yoshinaga Enomoto	15; 3	15; 8
4	(South Korea) (Japan)	Jung Jin-chul / Kim Sang-soo; Naoki Kawamae / Yusuke Shinkai	9; 15	6; 15
5	(South Korea) (Japan)	Jung Jae-sung / Lee Jae-jin; Kohei Hayasaka / Shoji Sato	12; 15	15; 2	17; 14

Malaysia
3
Nishiyama Park Gymnasium
22 July 2000

Thailand
1

			1	2	3
1	(Malaysia) (Thailand)	Lee Chong Wei; Jackaphan Thanat	11; 15	2; 15
2	(Malaysia) (Thailand)	Kuan Beng Hong; Vasin Nilyoke	12; 15	15; 11	15; 5
3	(Malaysia) (Thailand)	Yogendran Khrishnan; Parnuvat Ngernsrisuk	15; 4	15; 5
4	(Malaysia) (Thailand)	Mohd Fairuzizuan Mohd Tazari / Lin Woon Fui; Vasin Nilyoke / Noppanon Wuthiwikaikarn	15; 7	15; 11
5	(Malaysia) (Thailand)	Gan Teik Chai / Tan Chin Lee; Parnuvat Ngernsrisuk / Jackaphan Thanat				not played

China
3
Nishiyama Park Gymnasium
22 July 2000

India
0

			1	2	3
1	(China) (India)	Zhu Weilun; Anup Sridhar	17; 14	17; 14
2	(China) (India)	Lin Dan; Nishad Dravid	15; 5	15; 3
3	(China) (India)	Bao Chunlai; S. D. S. Krishna	15; 9	15; 4
4	(China) (India)	Cao Chen / Xie Zhongbo; Amar Mohite / Ajit Phatak				not played
5	(China) (India)	Sang Yang / Zheng Bo; S. D. S. Krishna / Anup Sridhar				not played

=== Semi-finals ===
Indonesia
3
Nishiyama Park Gymnasium
23 July 2000

South Korea
0

			1	2	3
1	(Indonesia) (South Korea)	Sony Dwi Kuncoro; Jang Young-soo	17; 14	15; 6
2	(Indonesia) (South Korea)	Anggun Nugroho; Lee Jae-jin	13; 15	15; 11	15; 8
3	(Indonesia) (South Korea)	Markis Kido; Jung Jae-sung	15; 6	15; 6
4	(Indonesia) (South Korea)	Yan Peter / Tri Heru Pamungkas; Jung Jin-chul / Kim Sang-soo				not played
5	(Indonesia) (South Korea)	Hendra Aprida Gunawan / Bambang Saifulloh; Jung Jae-sung / Lee Jae-jin				not played

China
3
Nishiyama Park Gymnasium
23 July 2000

Malaysia
1

			1	2	3
1	(China) (Malaysia)	Zhu Weilun; Lee Chong Wei	12; 15	9; 15
2	(China) (Malaysia)	Lin Dan; Kuan Beng Hong	15; 6	15; 9
3	(China) (Malaysia)	Bao Chunlai; Yogendran Khrishnan	15; 3	15; 7
4	(China) (Malaysia)	Sang Yang / Zheng Bo; Gan Teik Chai / Tan Chin Lee	15; 13	15; 3
5	(China) (Malaysia)	Cao Chen / Xie Zhongbo; Mohd Fairuzizuan Mohd Tazari / Lin Woon Fui				not played

=== Final ===
Indonesia
0
Nishiyama Park Gymnasium
24 July 2000

China
3

			1	2	3
1	(Indonesia) (China)	Sony Dwi Kuncoro; Zhu Weilun	4; 15	11; 15
2	(Indonesia) (China)	Anggun Nugroho; Lin Dan	10; 15	15; 7	8; 15
3	(Indonesia) (China)	Markis Kido; Bao Chunlai	8; 15	5; 15
4	(Indonesia) (China)	Yan Peter / Tri Heru Pamungkas; Sang Yang / Zheng Bo				not played
5	(Indonesia) (China)	Hendra Aprida Gunawan / Bambang Saifulloh; Cao Chen / Xie Zhongbo				not played
