= 1998 Asian Junior Badminton Championships – Boys' team =

Badminton championship in Kuala Lumpur, Malaysia

Boys' team at the 1998 Asian Junior Badminton Championships
- Venue: Kuala Lumpur Badminton Stadium
- Location: Kuala Lumpur, Malaysia
- Dates: 15–17 June 1998

The boys' team tournament at the 1998 Asian Junior Badminton Championships took place from 15 to 17 June 1998 at the Kuala Lumpur Badminton Stadium in Kuala Lumpur, Malaysia. A total of 20 countries competed in this event.

== Results ==
=== Bracket ===
Round of 32
Vietnam	1
Bangladesh	4
Myanmar	5
Sri Lanka	0
Philippines	5
Kazakhstan	0

Round of 16
China	5
Maldives	0
India	3
Singapore	2
Chinese Taipei	5
Bangladesh	0
South Korea	5
Brunei	0
Malaysia	5
Macau	0
Thailand	5
Myanmar	0
Japan	4
Philippines	1
Cambodia	0
Indonesia	5

Quarter-finals
China	3
India	2
Chinese Taipei	2
South Korea	3
Malaysia	3
Thailand	2
Japan	0
Indonesia	5

Semi-finals
China	4
Chinese Taipei	1
Malaysia	3
Indonesia	2

Final
China	3
Malaysia	2

=== Final ===
China
3
Kuala Lumpur Badminton Stadium
17 June 1998

Malaysia
2

			1	2	3
1	(China) (Malaysia)	Zhang Yi; Yeoh Kay Bin	13; 15	6; 15
2	(China) (Malaysia)	Chen Yu / Sang Yang; Chan Chong Ming / Charles Khoo	15; 2	8; 15	5; 15
3	(China) (Malaysia)	Cai Yun; Ong Huck Lee	15; 4	15; 7
4	(China) (Malaysia)	Jiang Shan / Zhang Yi; Tan Wei Meng / Teo Kok Seng	15; 9	18; 11
5	(China) (Malaysia)	Xiao Li; Allan Tai	15; 9	15; 8
