= 2001 Asian Junior Badminton Championships – Boys' team =

Badminton championship in Taipei, Taiwan

Boys' team at the 2001 Asian Junior Badminton Championships
- Venue: Taipei Gymnasium
- Location: Taipei, Taiwan
- Dates: 8–10 July 2001

The boys' team tournament at the 2001 Asian Junior Badminton Championships took place from 8 to 10 July 2001 at the Taipei Gymnasium in Taipei, Taiwan. A total of 16 countries competed in this event. Due to the 2001 Pacific typhoon season, flights from Hong Kong, Macau and Mongolia were disrupted which resulted in the withdrawal of all three teams. The Hong Kong team arrived later to compete in the individual events.

== Results ==
=== Bracket ===
Round of 16
Malaysia	w/o
Mongolia
Thailand	3
Maldives	0
Vietnam	w/o
Hong Kong
South Korea	3
Cambodia	0
Singapore	3
Bangladesh	0
Chinese Taipei	3
India	0
Japan	3
Philippines	0
Macau
Indonesia	w/o

Quarter-finals
Malaysia	3
Thailand	0
Vietnam	0
South Korea	3
Singapore	0
Chinese Taipei	3
Japan	0
Indonesia	3

Semi-finals
Malaysia	3
South Korea	2
Chinese Taipei	3
Indonesia	1

Final
Malaysia	3
Chinese Taipei	0
