= Badminton at the 2023 SEA Games – Mixed team =

Badminton – Mixed team at the 2023 SEA Games
- Venue: Morodok Techo Badminton Hall
- Dates: 8–10 May 2023
- Nations: 5

Medalists
| gold medal | Cambodia (CAM) |
| silver medal | Myanmar (MYA) |
| bronze medal | Brunei (BRU) |
| bronze medal | Laos (LAO) |

The mixed team badminton tournament at the 2023 SEA Games was held from 8 to 10 May 2023 at the Morodok Techo Badminton Hall, Phnom Penh, Cambodia. This is for the first time the mixed team event has been contested in the SEA Games. This event particularly contested for non stronger badminton nations. It is to provide an opportunity for other nations to win medals in badminton event and also introduced to help the development of badminton sport.

== Schedule ==
All times are Cambodia Standard Time (UTC+07:00)

| Date | Time | Event |
|---|---|---|
| Monday, 8 May | 15:00 | Quarter-final |
| Tuesday, 9 May | 12:30 | Semi-final |
| Wednesday, 10 May | 15:00 | Gold medal match |

== Bracket ==
Quarter-finals
3/4 | Cambodia (CAM) | 3
Timor-Leste (TLS) | 0

Semi-finals
1 | Myanmar (MYA) | 3
3/4 | Brunei (BRU) | 0
3/4 | Cambodia (CAM) | 3
2 | Laos (LAO) | 2

Final
1 | Myanmar (MYA) | 2
3/4 | Cambodia (CAM) | 3

== Quarter-finals ==
=== Cambodia vs Timor Leste ===
Cambodia
3
Morodok Techo Badminton Hall - 1
8 May 2023 15:00 UTC+7

Timor-Leste
0

| | | | 1 | 2 | 3 |
|---|---|---|---|---|---|---|
| 1 | (Cambodia) (Timor-Leste) | Vannthoun Vath / Kimloung Lim; Mourinho Zefi Costa Gusmao de Jesus / Zoraida Dela Torre Costa Gusmao de Jesus | 21; 7 | 21; 7 |
| 2 | (Cambodia) (Timor-Leste) | Sok Rikreay; Zidane Evaldo Costa Gusmao de Jesus | 21; 2 | 21; 6 |
| 3 | (Cambodia) (Timor-Leste) | Chourng Meng; Zoraida Dela Torre Costa Gusmao de Jesus | 21; 4 | 21; 7 |
| 4 | (Cambodia) (Timor-Leste) | Heng Mengleap / Yam Samnang; Mourinho Zefi Costa Gusmao de Jesus / Zidane Evaldo Costa Gusmao de Jesus | | | | not played |
| 5 | (Cambodia) (Timor-Leste) | Chheng Huy / Seavty Teav; Zoraida Dela Torre Costa Gusmão de Jesus / Hulda Meredith da Costa Gusmao Ribeiro | | | | not played |

== Semi-finals ==
=== Myanmar vs Brunei ===
Myanmar
3
Morodok Techo Badminton Hall - 1
9 May 2023 12:30 UTC+7

Brunei
0

| | | | 1 | 2 | 3 |
|---|---|---|---|---|---|---|
| 1 | (Myanmar) (Brunei) | Aung Myo Myo Htoo / Thet Htar Thuzar; Mohammad Shahirul Jenin / Siti Marinah Salleh | 21; 7 | 21; 10 |
| 2 | (Myanmar) (Brunei) | Hein Htut; Ahmad Mahyuddin Haji Abas | 21; 14 | 21; 12 |
| 3 | (Myanmar) (Brunei) | Thet Htar Thuzar; Nuraqilah Shahroney | 21; 2 | 21; 5 |
| 4 | (Myanmar) (Brunei) | Hein Htut / Arkar Phone Myat; Azri Safwan Jofri / Chang Huei Woo | | | | not played |
| 5 | (Myanmar) (Brunei) | Zun Myo Thet / Twal Tar Oo; Siti Marinah Salleh / Nuraqilah Shahroney | | | | not played |

=== Cambodia vs Laos ===
Cambodia
3
Morodok Techo Badminton Hall - 3
9 May 2023 12:30 UTC+7

Laos
2

| | | | 1 | 2 | 3 |
|---|---|---|---|---|---|
| 1 | (Cambodia) (Laos) | Yam Samnang / Seavty Teav; Namboun Luangamath / Thidachane Sypaseuth | 20; 22 | 20; 22 |
| 2 | (Cambodia) (Laos) | Sok Rikreay; Manut Phiasoulin | 10; 21 | 22; 20 | 21; 10 |
| 3 | (Cambodia) (Laos) | Chourng Meng; Phoutsavanh Daopasith | 21; 8 | 21; 12 |
| 4 | (Cambodia) (Laos) | Heng Mengleap / Yam Samnang; Namboun Luangamath / Phonesack Sokthavy | 19; 21 | 13; 21 |
| 5 | (Cambodia) (Laos) | Chheng Huy / Chourng Meng; Phoutsavanh Daopasith / Thidachane Sypaseuth | 21; 16 | 21; 3 |

== Finals ==
=== Myanmar vs Cambodia ===
Myanmar
2
Morodok Techo Badminton Hall - 1
10 May 2023 15:00 UTC+7

Cambodia
3

| | | | 1 | 2 | 3 |
|---|---|---|---|---|---|
| 1 | (Myanmar) (Cambodia) | Hein Htut; Sok Rikreay | 20; 22 | 8; 21 |
| 2 | (Myanmar) (Cambodia) | Thet Htar Thuzar; Seavty Teav | 21; 10 | 21; 12 |
| 3 | (Myanmar) (Cambodia) | Zun Myo Thet / Thwe Tar Oo; Chheng Huy / Chourng Meng | 11; 21 | 7; 21 |
| 4 | (Myanmar) (Cambodia) | Hein Htut / Arkar Phone Myat; Heng Mengleap / Yam Samnang | 21; 17 | 16; 21 | 21; 17 |
| 5 | (Myanmar) (Cambodia) | Aung Myo Htoo / Thet Htar Thuzar; Sok Rikreay / Chourng Meng | 19; 21 | 19; 21 |

== Controversy ==
Throughout the history of badminton events at the SEA Games, this is the first time that there has been a restriction on participation for the mixed team event. The countries affected by this restriction are Indonesia, Malaysia, the Philippines, Singapore, Thailand, and Vietnam. However, this is also the first time the mixed team event has been contested. Usually, badminton has seven gold medals in contention with two medals from the men's and women's team events, and five from the individual events.

Bambang Roedyanto, a technical official for the games, claimed that “Cambodia [wanted] the opportunity to win medals from [badminton], so [the mixed team event] was held with countries [with developing badminton teams]”.

== See also ==
- Individual event tournament
- Men's team tournament
- Women's team tournament
