= Laos national badminton team =

National badminton team

Laos
- Association: Badminton Lao Federation (BLF)
- Confederation: BA (Asia)
- President: Bounleua Sixayvoravong

BWF ranking
- Current ranking: 131 ▼16 (2 January 2024)
- Highest ranking: 66 (1 July 2011)

Asian Men's Team Championships
- Appearances: 3 (first in 1969)
- Best result: Quarter-finals (1969)

The Laos national badminton team represents Laos in international badminton team competitions. It reached the semifinals of the 2023 Southeast Asian Games mixed team event. The Laotian junior boys team were semi-finalists at the 2018 ASEAN School Games.

== History ==
The team was formed in February 1955 after the formation of the Badminton Lao Federation which was then called Association de Badminton du Royaume de Laos. It then competed in local sport events. It won its first medals in badminton at the 1959 Southeast Asian Peninsular Games when Boonpheng Siaksone and Tiock won bronze in men's doubles.

In 2009, Khamkouy Phontexa and Somsaveng Semsylvong were appointed as coaches for the team.

=== Men's team ===
Laos first competed in the 1965 Southeast Asian Peninsular Games. The team defeated South Vietnam 3–2 in the quarter-finals. In the semi-finals, the team lost 3–2 to Malaya. In the bronze medal match, the team lost 3–2 to Singapore. In 2007, Laos competed at the 2007 Southeast Asian Games. The team lost 0–3 to Thailand in 2007. In the 2009 Southeast Games, the team had a bye in a first round and lost 0–3 to Indonesia in the quarter-finals.

=== Women's team ===
The team first competed at the 2007 Southeast Asian Games. It had the same fate as the men's team when it lost in the quarter-finals to Thailand. In 2009, it lost 0–3 to Singapore.

=== Mixed team ===
The team competed in the 2023 Southeast Asian Games. It was given a bye in the quarter-finals and entered the semi-finals where it went head to head against home team Cambodia. It scored the first point when national mixed doubles pair Namboun Luangamath and Thidachane Sypaseuth defeated Cambodia's Yam Samnang and Seavty Teav 22–20, 22–20. In the second match, it failed to win the second point after Manut Phiasoulin lost to Sok Rikreay 21–10, 20–22, 10–21. It lost in the semi-finals after it lost in the women's doubles tiebreaker match. It was awarded bronze.

== Tournament ==
=== Asian Team Championships ===
==== Men's team ====
Year	Round	Pos
1962	Did not enter	
1965	Did not enter	
1969	Quarter-finals	
1971	Round of 16	
1976	Did not enter	
1983	Did not enter	
1985	Did not enter	
1987	Did not enter	
1989	Did not enter	
1993	Did not enter	
2004	Did not enter	
2006	Did not enter	
2008	Did not enter	
2010	Group stage	
2012	Did not enter	
2016	Did not enter	
2018	Did not enter	
2020	Did not enter	
2022	Did not enter	
2024	Did not enter	
2026	TBD	
2028	TBD	
2030	TBD	

=== SEA Games ===
==== Men's team ====
Year	Round	Pos
1965	Fourth place	4th
1971	Did not enter	
1973	Did not enter	
1975	Did not enter	
1977	Did not enter	
1979	Did not enter	
1981	Did not enter	
1983	Did not enter	
1985	Did not enter	
1987	Did not enter	
1989	Quarter-finals	
1991	Did not enter	
1993	Did not enter	
1995	Did not enter	
1997	Did not enter	
1999	Did not enter	
2001	Did not enter	
2003	Did not enter	
2005	Did not enter	
2007	Quarter-finals	
2009	Quarter-finals	
2011	Quarter-finals	
2015	Quarter-finals	
2017	Quarter-finals	
2019	Did not enter	
2021	Quarter-finals	
2023	Did not enter	
2025	Quarter-finals	
2027	TBD	
2029	TBD	
2031	TBD	
2033	TBD	

==== Women's team ====
Year	Round	Pos
1965	Did not enter	
1971	Did not enter	
1973	Did not enter	
1975	Did not enter	
1977	Did not enter	
1979	Did not enter	
1981	Did not enter	
1983	Did not enter	
1985	Did not enter	
1987	Did not enter	
1989	Did not enter	
1991	Did not enter	
1993	Did not enter	
1995	Did not enter	
1997	Did not enter	
1999	Did not enter	
2001	Did not enter	
2003	Did not enter	
2005	Did not enter	
2007	Quarter-finals	
2009	Quarter-finals	
2011	Did not enter	
2015	Did not enter	
2017	Did not enter	
2019	Did not enter	
2021	Did not enter	
2023	Did not enter	
2025	Did not enter	
2027	TBD	
2029	TBD	
2031	TBD	
2033	TBD	

==== Mixed team ====
Year	Round	Pos
2023	Semi-finals	3rd

=== ASEAN University Games ===
==== Men's team ====
Year	Round	Pos
2004	Did not enter	
2006	Did not enter	
2008	Did not enter	
2010	Did not enter	
2012	Quarter-finals	5th
2014	Did not enter	
2016	Did not enter	
2018	Did not enter	
2022	Did not enter	
2024	TBD	

==== Women's team ====
Year	Round	Pos
2004	Did not enter	
2006	Did not enter	
2008	Did not enter	
2010	Did not enter	
2012	Semi-finals	4th
2014	Did not enter	
2016	Did not enter	
2018	Did not enter	
2022	Did not enter	
2024	TBD	

**Red border color indicates tournament was held on home soil.

== Junior competitive record ==
=== Asian Junior Team Championships ===
==== Boys' team ====
Year	Round	Pos
1997	Did not enter	
1998	Did not enter	
1999	Did not enter	
2000	Did not enter	
2001	Did not enter	
2002	Round of 16	
2004	Did not enter	
2005	Did not enter	

==== Mixed team ====
Year	Round	Pos
2006	Did not enter	
2007	Did not enter	
2008	Did not enter	
2009	Group stage	
2010	Did not enter	
2011	Did not enter	
2012	Did not enter	
2013	Did not enter	
2014	Did not enter	
2015	Did not enter	
2016	Did not enter	
2017	Did not enter	
2018	Did not enter	
2019	Did not enter	
2023	Did not enter	
2024	TBD	
2025	TBD	

=== ASEAN School Games ===
==== Boys' team ====
Year	Round	Pos
2009	Did not enter	
2010	Did not enter	
2011	Did not enter	
2012	Did not enter	
2013	Group stage	
2014	Did not enter	
2015	Did not enter	
2016	Group stage	
2017	Group stage	
2018	Semi-finals	4th
2019	Group stage	

==== Girls' team ====
Year	Round	Pos
2009	Did not enter	
2010	Did not enter	
2011	Did not enter	
2012	Did not enter	
2013	Group stage	
2014	Did not enter	
2015	Did not enter	
2016	Group stage	
2017	Group stage	
2018	Group stage	
2019	Group stage	

**Red border color indicates tournament was held on home soil.

== Roster ==
As of 2 January 2024

=== Men's team ===
Name	DoB/Age	Ranking of event		
Name	DoB/Age	MS	MD	XD
Namboun Luangamath	24 September 1997 (age 28)	-	503	-
Vixunnalath Phichith	6 May 1998 (age 27)	-	-	-
Phonesack Sokthavy	13 September 2002 (age 23)	-	-	-
Manut Phiasoulin	6 October 2005 (age 20)	-	-	-
Daomixay Vorlasing	6 December 2001 (age 24)	-	503	-

=== Women's team ===
Name	DoB/Age	Ranking of event		
Name	DoB/Age	WS	WD	XD
Phoutsavanh Daopasith	27 September 2006 (age 19)	-	-	-
Vilakone Kommanivanh	22 November 2002 (age 23)	-	-	-
Xiliphone Soukkhaphonh	23 July 1997 (age 28)	-	-	-
Thidachane Sypaseuth	20 January 1999 (age 27)	-	-	-
Mimi Sixomxeuane	20 June 2000 (age 25)	-	-	-

=== Previous squads ===
==== Southeast Asian Games ====
- Men's team: 2021
- Mixed team: 2023
