= 1999 Asian Junior Badminton Championships – Boys' team =

Badminton championship in Yangon, Myanmar

Boys' team at the 1999 Asian Junior Badminton Championships
- Venue: Thuwunna National Indoor Stadium (1)
- Location: Yangon, Myanmar
- Dates: 11–13 July 1999

The boys' team tournament at the 1999 Asian Junior Badminton Championships took place from 11 to 13 July 1999 at the Thuwunna National Indoor Stadium (1) in Yangon, Myanmar. A total of 20 countries competed in this event.

== Results ==
=== Bracket ===
Round of 32
India	5
Sri Lanka	0
Myanmar	5
Kazakhstan	0

Round of 16
China	5
Brunei	0
India	2
Singapore	3
South Korea	5
Cambodia	0
Thailand	5
Syria	0
Japan	4
Vietnam	1
Iran	0
Indonesia	5
Chinese Taipei	4
Myanmar	1
Maldives	0
Malaysia	5

Quarter-finals
China	3
Singapore	2
South Korea	3
Thailand	2
Japan	2
Indonesia	3
Chinese Taipei	2
Malaysia	3

Semi-finals
China	3
South Korea	2
Indonesia	3
Malaysia	2

Final
China	2
Indonesia	3

=== Semi-finals ===
China
3
Thuwunna National Indoor Stadium – 1
12 July 1999

South Korea
2

			1	2	3
1	(China) (South Korea)	Sang Yang; Jang Young-soo	15; 12	15; 4
2	(China) (South Korea)	Chen Yu; Lee Jae-jin	15; 4	15; 2
3	(China) (South Korea)	Xiao Li; Heo Hoon-hoi	15; 3	15; 10
4	(China) (South Korea)	Chen Yu / Lin Guangyun; Cho Han-sung / Lee Jae-jin				w/o
5	(China) (South Korea)	Xiao Li / Xie Zhongbo; Heo Hoon-hoi / Jung Jae-sung				w/o

Indonesia
3
Thuwunna National Indoor Stadium – 1
12 July 1999

Malaysia
2

			1	2	3
1	(Indonesia) (Malaysia)	Bobby Santoso; Alvin Chew	8; 15	5; 15
2	(Indonesia) (Malaysia)	Endra Feriyanto; Kuan Beng Hong	15; 5	10; 15	15; 3
3	(Indonesia) (Malaysia)	Wiempie Mahardi; Nazree Latifi	15; 5	15; 11
4	(Indonesia) (Malaysia)	Hendri Saputra / Wandry Saputra; Charles Khoo / Teo Kok Seng	15; 5	13; 15	15; 3
5	(Indonesia) (Malaysia)	Wiempie Mahardi / Bobby Santoso; Gan Teik Chai / Gavin Liew				w/o

=== Final ===
China
2
Thuwunna National Indoor Stadium – 1
13 July 1999

Indonesia
3

			1	2	3
1	(China) (Indonesia)	Sang Yang; Bobby Santoso	15; 12	16; 17	15; 3
2	(China) (Indonesia)	Chen Yu; Endra Feriyanto	15; 12	9; 15	9; 15
3	(China) (Indonesia)	Xiao Li; Wiempie Mahardi	13; 15	15; 6	12; 15
4	(China) (Indonesia)	Xiao Li / Xie Zhongbo; Hendri Saputra / Wandry Saputra				w/o
5	(China) (Indonesia)	Chen Yu / Lin Guangyun; Wiempie Mahardi / Bobby Santoso	15; 3	15; 0
