= 2002 Asian Junior Badminton Championships – Boys' team =

Badminton championship in Kuala Lumpur, Malaysia

Boys' team at the 2002 Asian Junior Badminton Championships
- Venue: Kuala Lumpur Badminton Stadium
- Location: Kuala Lumpur, Malaysia
- Dates: 14–16 July 2002

The boys' team tournament at the 2002 Asian Junior Badminton Championships took place from 14 to 16 July 2002 at the Kuala Lumpur Badminton Stadium in Kuala Lumpur, Malaysia. A total of 12 countries competed in this event.

== Results ==
=== Bracket ===
Round of 16
Chinese Taipei	3
Bangladesh	0
Singapore	3
Laos	0
Hong Kong	2
India	3
Japan	3
Myanmar	0

Quarter-finals
China	3
Chinese Taipei	1
South Korea	3
Singapore	0
Indonesia	3
India	0
Japan	2
Malaysia	3

Semi-finals
China	1
South Korea	3
Indonesia	3
Malaysia	0

Final
South Korea	1
Indonesia	3

=== Final ===
Indonesia
3
Kuala Lumpur Badminton Stadium
16 July 2002

South Korea
1

			1	2	3
1	(Indonesia) (South Korea)	Holvy de Pauw; Hong Seung-ki	15; 12	9; 15	15; 9
2	(Indonesia) (South Korea)	Simon Santoso; Park Sung-hwan	11; 15	15; 2	15; 10
3	(Indonesia) (South Korea)	Roy Purnomo; Hwang Ji-man	9; 15	1; 15
4	(Indonesia) (South Korea)	Markis Kido / Rian Sukmawan; Han Sang-hoon / Kim Dae-sung	15; 12	7; 15	15; 7
5	(Indonesia) (South Korea)	Joko Riyadi / Hendra Setiawan; Jung Hoon-min / Jung Ra-sub				not played
