= Bangladesh Badminton Federation =

Sports governing body

Bangladesh Badminton Federation (BBF)
- বাংলাদেশ ব্যাডমিন্টন ফেডারেশন
- Abbreviation: BBF
- Formation: 1972
- Type: Autonomous
- Purpose: Development of Badminton in Bangladesh
- Headquarters: Dhaka, Bangladesh
- Location: Shahid Tajuddin Ahmed Indoor Stadium, Bangabandhu National Stadium Rd
- Region served: Bangladesh
- Official language: Bengali, English
- Secretary General: Rasel Kabir Sumon
- President: Abdul Malek
- Parent organization: Badminton World Federation
- Budget: 15 m BDT

Bangladesh Badminton Federation is the national organization governing the sport of badminton in Bangladesh.

As of 2017, Abdul Malek is the president of the federation.

Md. Alamgir Hossain has been the general secretary since 2022, and Moshiur Rahman has been the chief executive officer since 2018.

== History ==
Bangladesh Badminton Federation was established in 1972 after the Bangladesh Liberation war. Md. Yousuf Ali was the founding president of the organization and served till 1976.

The federation is headquartered at Shaheed Tajuddin Ahmed National Indoor Stadium, in Dhaka. In December 2020, they sought to limit use of the stadium by locking the electrical panels that power the main lights. General secretary Hossain said it was necessary to reduce their electric bill and maintenance costs.

In August 2021, Ekattor TV reported that the stadium was in disrepair. The courts had broken wooden floors which dipped when walking. During the quarter-final 'Bangabandhu Bangladesh Games' in April, player Gazi Nur Alam Tushar tore a ligament, which the report blamed on the condition of the floors. The federation contributed towards Tushar's medical expenses.
