= Badminton at the 2011 SEA Games – Men's team =

These are the results of the men's team competition in badminton at the 2011 SEA Games in Jakarta.

== Medalists ==
Gold	Silver	Bronze
Indonesia (INA)	Malaysia (MAS)	Thailand (THA) Singapore (SIN)

== Draw ==
Round 1
Indonesia
Bye
Laos
Bye
Thailand
Bye
Cambodia
Bye
Myanmar	1
Philippines	3
Bye
Singapore
Bye
Vietnam
Bye
Malaysia

Quarterfinal
Indonesia	3
Laos	0
Thailand	3
Cambodia	0
Philippines	0
Singapore	3
Vietnam	1
Malaysia	3

Semifinal
Indonesia	3
Thailand	2
Singapore	0
Malaysia	3

Final
Indonesia	3
Malaysia	1

=== First round ===
Myanmar
1
Senayan Sport Complex
2011-11-12
09:00

Philippines
3

			1	2	3
1	(Myanmar) (Philippines)	Ye Min Aung; Antonino Benjamin Gadi	15; 21	16; 21
2	(Myanmar) (Philippines)	Myo Min Tun; Peter Gabriel Magnaye	16; 21	21; 17	21; 16
3	(Myanmar) (Philippines)	Thet Khine; Paul Jefferson Vivas	10; 21	4; 21
4	(Myanmar) (Philippines)	Ye Min Aung / Thein Win Aung; Paul Jefferson Vivas / Ronel Estanislao	13; 21	21; 18	12; 21
5	(Myanmar) (Philippines)	Thet Lwin Myint / Myo Zaw Oo; Antonino Benjamin Gadi / Peter Gabriel Magnaye				not played

=== Quarterfinal ===
Indonesia
3
Senayan Sport Complex
2011-11-12
14:00

Laos
0

			1	2	3
1	(Indonesia) (Laos)	Simon Santoso; Phongthanom Ouankhamchanh	21; 12	21; 12
2	(Indonesia) (Laos)	Markis Kido / Hendra Setiawan; Xaysomphone Vongpachith / Tommy Sivilay	21; 5	21; 7
3	(Indonesia) (Laos)	Tommy Sugiarto; Xaychaleun Xayasit	21; 7	21; 8

Thailand
3
Senayan Sport Complex
2011-11-12
14:00

Cambodia
0

			1	2	3
1	(Thailand) (Cambodia)	Tanongsak Saensomboonsuk; Teav Yongvannak	21; 14	21; 10
2	(Thailand) (Cambodia)	Pakkawat Vilailak; Vann Chanpisey	21; 6	21; 9
3	(Thailand) (Cambodia)	Pisit Poodchalat; Prum Saravuth	21; 17	21; 9

Philippines
0
Senayan Sport Complex
2011-11-12
16:00

Singapore
3

			1	2	3
1	(Philippines) (Singapore)	Antonino Benjamin Gadi; Derek Wong	18; 21	21; 18	12; 21
2	(Philippines) (Singapore)	Peter Gabriel Magnaye; Ashton Chen	12; 21	14; 21
3	(Philippines) (Singapore)	Paul Jefferson Vivas; Huang Chao	11; 21	14; 21

Vietnam
1
Senayan Sport Complex
2011-11-12
14:00

Malaysia
3

			1	2	3
1	(Vietnam) (Malaysia)	Nguyễn Tiến Minh; Daren Liew	22; 20	21; 14
2	(Vietnam) (Malaysia)	Bùi Bằng Đức / Đào Mạnh Thắng; Goh Wei Shem / Lim Khim Wah	14; 21	8; 21
3	(Vietnam) (Malaysia)	Lê Hà Anh; Mohamad Arif Abdul Latif	8; 21	10; 21
4	(Vietnam) (Malaysia)	Dương Bảo Đức / Nguyễn Hoàng Nam; Mak Hee Chun / Ong Soon Hock	10; 21	14; 21

=== Semifinal ===
Indonesia
3
Senayan Sport Complex
2011-11-13
14:00

Thailand
2

			1	2	3
1	(Indonesia) (Thailand)	Taufik Hidayat; Tanongsak Saensomboonsuk	13; 21	16; 21
2	(Indonesia) (Thailand)	Mohammad Ahsan / Bona Septano; Sudket Prapakamol / Songphon Anugritayawon	14; 21	21; 16	21; 14
3	(Indonesia) (Thailand)	Simon Santoso; Suppanyu Avihingsanon	21; 11	21; 14
4	(Indonesia) (Thailand)	Markis Kido / Hendra Setiawan; Maneepong Jongjit / Bodin Isara	20; 22	23; 21	18; 21
5	(Indonesia) (Thailand)	Dionysius Hayom Rumbaka; Pakkawat Vilailak	21; 15	21; 18

Singapore
0
Senayan Sport Complex
2011-11-13
14:00

Malaysia
3

			1	2	3
1	(Singapore) (Malaysia)	Derek Wong; Daren Liew	17; 21	18; 21
2	(Singapore) (Malaysia)	Liu Yi / Terry Yeo; Goh Wei Shem / Lim Khim Wah	13; 21	13; 21
3	(Singapore) (Malaysia)	Ashton Chen; Mohamad Arif Abdul Latif	14; 21	21; 12	15; 21

=== Final ===
Indonesia
3
Senayan Sport Complex
2011-11-15
15:00

Malaysia
1

			1	2	3
1	(Indonesia) (Malaysia)	Simon Santoso; Daren Liew	22; 20	21; 12
2	(Indonesia) (Malaysia)	Mohammad Ahsan / Bona Septano; Goh Wei Shem / Lim Khim Wah	18; 21	21; 15	23; 25
3	(Indonesia) (Malaysia)	Tommy Sugiarto; Mohamad Arif Abdul Latif	21; 13	21; 17
4	(Indonesia) (Malaysia)	Markis Kido / Hendra Setiawan; Mak Hee Chun / Ong Soon Hock	21; 10	21; 14
