= Badminton at the 2023 SEA Games – Women's team =

Badminton – Women's team at the 2023 SEA Games
- Venue: Morodok Techo Badminton Hall
- Dates: 8–11 May 2023
- Nations: 7

Medalists
gold medal	Thailand (THA)
silver medal	Indonesia (INA)
bronze medal	Singapore (SGP)
bronze medal	Philippines (PHI)

The women's team badminton tournament at the 2023 SEA Games was held from 8 to 11 May 2023 at the Morodok Techo Badminton Hall, Phnom Penh, Cambodia. Thailand women's team is the defending champions in this event. The team targeted to retain the title.

== Schedule ==
All times are Cambodia Standard Time (UTC+07:00)

Date	Time	Event
Monday, 8 May	10:00	Quarter-final
Monday, 8 May	12:30	Quarter-final
Monday, 9 May	10:00	Quarter-final
Tuesday, 10 May	10:00	Semi-final
Wednesday, 11 May	10:00	Gold medal match

== Bracket ==
Quarter-finals
3/4	Singapore (SGP)	3
Vietnam (VIE)	0
Philippines (PHI)	3
3/4	Malaysia (MAS)	0
Cambodia (CAM)	0
2	Indonesia (INA)	3

Semi-finals
1	Thailand (THA)	3
3/4	Singapore (SGP)	1
Philippines (PHI)	0
2	Indonesia (INA)	3

Final
1	Thailand (THA)	3
2	Indonesia (INA)	0

== Quarter-finals ==
=== Singapore vs Vietnam ===
Singapore
3
Morodok Techo Badminton Hall - 2
8 May 2023 10:00 UTC+7

Vietnam
0

			1	2	3
1	(Singapore) (Vietnam)	Yeo Jia Min; Nguyễn Thùy Linh	22; 20	21; 18
2	(Singapore) (Vietnam)	Insyirah Khan; Vũ Thị Trang	21; 16	13; 21	22; 20
3	(Singapore) (Vietnam)	Jin Yujia / Crystal Wong; Đinh Thị Phương Hồng / Phạm Thị Khánh	21; 14	21; 19
4	(Singapore) (Vietnam)	Megan Lee; Trần Thị Phương Thúy				not played
5	(Singapore) (Vietnam)	Heng Xiao En / Yeo Jia Min; Thân Vân Anh / Vũ Thị Trang				not played

=== Philippines vs Malaysia ===
Philippines
3
Morodok Techo Badminton Hall - 3
8 May 2023 12:30 UTC+7

Malaysia
0

			1	2	3
1	(Philippines) (Malaysia)	Mikaela de Guzman; Tan Zhing Yi	24; 22	21; 18
2	(Philippines) (Malaysia)	Alyssa Leonardo / Thea Pomar; Low Yeen Yuan / Valeree Siow	22; 20	19; 21	24; 22
3	(Philippines) (Malaysia)	Bianca Carlos; Siti Nurshuhaini	21; 16	21; 18
4	(Philippines) (Malaysia)	Nicole Albo / Eleanor Inlayo; Cheng Su Hui / Cheng Su Yin				not played
5	(Philippines) (Malaysia)	Christel Fuentespina; Ong Xin Yee				not played

=== Cambodia vs Indonesia ===
Cambodia
0
Morodok Techo Badminton Hall - 2
9 May 2023 10:00 UTC+7

Indonesia
3

			1	2	3
1	(Cambodia) (Indonesia)	Phon Chenda; Komang Ayu Cahya Dewi	4; 21	4; 21
2	(Cambodia) (Indonesia)	Chheng Huy / Seavty Teav; Febriana Dwipuji Kusuma / Amalia Cahaya Pratiwi	12; 21	15; 21
3	(Cambodia) (Indonesia)	Heang Leakhena; Ester Nurumi Tri Wardoyo	6; 21	8; 21
4	(Cambodia) (Indonesia)	Phon Chenda / Kimloung Lim; Meilysa Trias Puspita Sari / Rachel Allessya Rose				not played
5	(Cambodia) (Indonesia)	Bun Srey Hong; Mutiara Ayu Puspitasari				not played

== Semi-finals ==
=== Thailand vs Singapore ===
Thailand
3
Morodok Techo Badminton Hall - 1
10 May 2023 10:00 UTC+7

Singapore
1

			1	2	3
1	(Thailand) (Singapore)	Lalinrat Chaiwan; Yeo Jia Min	15; 21	6; 21
2	(Thailand) (Singapore)	Jongkolphan Kititharakul / Rawinda Prajongjai; Jin Yujia / Crystal Wong	12; 21	21; 9	21; 14
3	(Thailand) (Singapore)	Supanida Katethong; Insyirah Khan	21; 11	21; 8
4	(Thailand) (Singapore)	Benyapa Aimsaard / Nuntakarn Aimsaard; Heng Xiao En / Elsa Lai	21; 6	21; 7
5	(Thailand) (Singapore)	Pitchamon Opatniputh; Megan Lee				not played

=== Philippines vs Indonesia ===
Philippines
0
Morodok Techo Badminton Hall - 2
10 May 2023 10:00 UTC+7

Indonesia
3

			1	2	3
1	(Philippines) (Indonesia)	Mikaela de Guzman; Komang Ayu Cahya Dewi	13; 21	5; 21
2	(Philippines) (Indonesia)	Nicole Albo / Thea Pomar; Febriana Dwipuji Kusuma / Amalia Cahaya Pratiwi	11; 21	12; 21
3	(Philippines) (Indonesia)	Bianca Carlos; Ester Nurumi Tri Wardoyo	19; 21	9; 21
4	(Philippines) (Indonesia)	Alyssa Leonardo / Susmita Ramos; Meilysa Trias Puspita Sari / Rachel Allessya Rose				not played
5	(Philippines) (Indonesia)	Christel Fuentespina; Mutiara Ayu Puspitasari				not played

== Finals ==
=== Thailand vs Indonesia ===
Thailand
3
Morodok Techo Badminton Hall - 1
11 May 2023 10:00 UTC+7

Indonesia
0

			1	2	3
1	(Thailand) (Indonesia)	Lalinrat Chaiwan; Komang Ayu Cahya Dewi	21; 19	21; 17
2	(Thailand) (Indonesia)	Jongkolphan Kititharakul / Rawinda Prajongjai; Febriana Dwipuji Kusuma / Amalia Cahaya Pratiwi	21; 11	21; 15
3	(Thailand) (Indonesia)	Supanida Katethong; Ester Nurumi Tri Wardoyo	21; 11	21; 12
4	(Thailand) (Indonesia)	Benyapa Aimsaard / Nuntakarn Aimsaard; Meilysa Trias Puspita Sari / Rachel Allessya Rose				not played
5	(Thailand) (Indonesia)	Pitchamon Opatniputh; Mutiara Ayu Puspitasari				not played

== See also ==
- Individual event tournament
- Men's team tournament
- Mixed team tournament
