= 2010 Badminton Asia Thomas & Uber Cup Preliminaries =

Badminton championships

Tournament details
- Dates: 22–28 February
- Venue: Nakhon Ratchasima Sports Complex
- Location: Nakhon Ratchasima, Thailand

The 2010 Badminton Asia Thomas & Uber Cup Preliminaries were the Asian qualifiers for the 2010 Thomas & Uber Cup. The tournament was held from 22 to 28 February.

== Tournament ==
The 2010 Badminton Asia Thomas & Uber Cup Preliminaries serve as the Asian qualification event towards the 2010 Thomas & Uber Cup in Kuala Lumpur, Malaysia.

=== Venue ===
The tournament was held at the Nakhon Ratchasima Sports Complex in Nakhon Ratchasima, Thailand.

=== Draw ===
- Men's team

Group A	Group B	Group C	Group D
Indonesia; Singapore; Vietnam	Hong Kong; Philippines; Chinese Taipei	Cambodia; India; Sri Lanka; Thailand	Japan; South Korea; Laos

- Women's team

Group X	Group Y
Indonesia; South Korea; Singapore; Sri Lanka; Thailand	Chinese Taipei; Hong Kong; India; Japan; Philippines

== Men's team ==
All times are Indochina Time (UTC+07:00).

=== Group stage ===
==== Group A ====
Pos	Team	Pld	W	L	MF	MA	MD	GF	GA	GD	PF	PA	PD	Pts	Qualification
1	Indonesia	2	2	0	9	1	+8	18	2	+16	415	239	+176	2	Knockout stage
2	Vietnam	2	1	1	3	7	−4	7	14	−7	337	403	−66	1	Knockout stage
3	Singapore	2	0	2	3	7	−4	6	15	−9	317	427	−110	0	

Source: BWF

Indonesia
4
Nakhon Ratchasima Sports Complex, Court 3
22 February 2010, 18:00 UTC+7

Singapore
1

			1	2	3
1	(Indonesia) (Singapore)	Taufik Hidayat; Derek Wong	21; 10	21; 18
2	(Indonesia) (Singapore)	Yonathan Suryatama Dasuki / Rian Sukmawan; Hendri Saputra / Hendra Wijaya	19; 21	18; 21
3	(Indonesia) (Singapore)	Sony Dwi Kuncoro; Ashton Chen	21; 12	21; 9
4	(Indonesia) (Singapore)	Mohammad Ahsan / Alvent Yulianto; Jonathan Tang / Terry Yeo	21; 3	21; 19
5	(Indonesia) (Singapore)	Simon Santoso; Kelvin Ho	21; 5	21; 6

Vietnam
3
Nakhon Ratchasima Sports Complex, Court 3
23 February 2010, 17:30 UTC+7

Singapore
2

			1	2	3
1	(Vietnam) (Singapore)	Nguyễn Tiến Minh; Derek Wong	21; 13	21; 19
2	(Vietnam) (Singapore)	Nguyễn Hoàng Nam; Ashton Chen	17; 21	21; 9	21; 19
3	(Vietnam) (Singapore)	Dương Bảo Đức; Chen Guorui	21; 15	21; 19
4	(Vietnam) (Singapore)	Nguyễn Hoàng Nam / Nguyễn Tiến Minh; Hendri Saputra / Jonathan Tang	21; 14	20; 22		retired
5	(Vietnam) (Singapore)	Dương Bảo Đức / Phạm Cao Hiếu; Hendra Wijaya / Terry Yeo	19; 21	19; 21

Indonesia
5
Nakhon Ratchasima Sports Complex, Court 3
24 February 2010, 17:30 UTC+7

Vietnam
0

			1	2	3
1	(Indonesia) (Vietnam)	Taufik Hidayat; Nguyễn Tiến Minh	21; 15	21; 11
2	(Indonesia) (Vietnam)	Sony Dwi Kuncoro; Nguyễn Hoàng Nam	21; 12	21; 15
3	(Indonesia) (Vietnam)	Simon Santoso; Huỳnh Vinh	21; 6	21; 8
4	(Indonesia) (Vietnam)	Markis Kido / Alvent Yulianto; Dương Bảo Đức / Phạm Cao Hiếu	21; 13	21; 13
5	(Indonesia) (Vietnam)	Yonathan Suryatama Dasuki / Rian Sukmawan; Huỳnh Vinh / Nguyễn Hoàng Nam	21; 6	21; 16

==== Group B ====
Pos	Team	Pld	W	L	MF	MA	MD	GF	GA	GD	PF	PA	PD	Pts	Qualification
1	Chinese Taipei	2	2	0	8	2	+6	17	5	+12	444	318	+126	2	Knockout stage
2	Hong Kong	2	1	1	7	3	+4	15	7	+8	416	345	+71	1	Knockout stage
3	Philippines	2	0	2	0	10	−10	0	20	−20	223	420	−197	0	

Source: BWF

Chinese Taipei
5
Nakhon Ratchasima Sports Complex, Court 4
22 February 2010, 18:00 UTC+7

Philippines
0

			1	2	3
1	(Chinese Taipei) (Philippines)	Hsueh Hsuan-yi; Ian Mendez	21; 8	21; 11
2	(Chinese Taipei) (Philippines)	Fang Chieh-min / Lee Sheng-mu; Ronel Estanislao / Paul Jefferson Vivas	21; 8	21; 13
3	(Chinese Taipei) (Philippines)	Hsu Jen-hao; Andrei Babad	21; 6	21; 15
4	(Chinese Taipei) (Philippines)	Chou Tien-chen; Paul Jefferson Vivas	21; 11	21; 19
5	(Chinese Taipei) (Philippines)	Chen Hung-ling / Lin Yu-lang; Andrei Babad / Peter Gabriel Magnaye	21; 9	21; 12

Hong Kong
5
Nakhon Ratchasima Sports Complex, Court 4
23 February 2010, 17:30 UTC+7

Philippines
0

			1	2	3
1	(Hong Kong) (Philippines)	Hu Yun; Ian Mendez	21; 16	21; 13
2	(Hong Kong) (Philippines)	Chan Yan Kit; Peter Gabriel Magnaye	21; 7	21; 12
3	(Hong Kong) (Philippines)	Wong Wing Ki; Ronel Estanislao	21; 7	21; 6
4	(Hong Kong) (Philippines)	Yohan Hadikusumo Wiratama / Wong Wai Hong; Andrei Babad / Peter Gabriel Magnaye	21; 10	21; 11
5	(Hong Kong) (Philippines)	Leung Chun Yiu / Lo Lok Kei; Ronel Estanislao / Paul Jefferson Vivas	21; 19	21; 10

Chinese Taipei
2
Nakhon Ratchasima Sports Complex, Court 4
24 February 2010, 17:30 UTC+7

Hong Kong
3

			1	2	3
1	(Chinese Taipei) (Hong Kong)	Hsueh Hsuan-yi; Hu Yun	21; 14	18; 21	15; 21
2	(Chinese Taipei) (Hong Kong)	Chen Hung-ling / Lin Yu-lang; Wiratama Yohan Hadikusumo / Wong Wai Hong	17; 21	21; 15	21; 16
3	(Chinese Taipei) (Hong Kong)	Hsu Jen-hao; Chan Yan Kit	21; 15	21; 18
4	(Chinese Taipei) (Hong Kong)	Fang Chieh-min / Lee Sheng-mu; Leung Chun Yiu / Lo Lok Kei	21; 10	21; 10
5	(Chinese Taipei) (Hong Kong)	Chou Tien-chen; Wong Wing Ki	22; 24	15; 21

==== Group C ====
Pos	Team	Pld	W	L	MF	MA	MD	GF	GA	GD	PF	PA	PD	Pts	Qualification
1	India	3	3	0	13	2	+11	26	7	+19	670	443	+227	3	Knockout stage
2	Thailand (H)	3	2	1	11	4	+7	23	10	+13	636	475	+161	2	Knockout stage
3	Sri Lanka	3	1	2	6	9	−3	16	18	−2	567	578	−11	1	
4	Cambodia	3	0	3	0	15	−15	0	30	−30	253	630	−377	0	

Source: BWF
(H) Host

India
5
Nakhon Ratchasima Sports Complex, Court 1
22 February 2010, 14:00 UTC+7

Sri Lanka
0

			1	2	3
1	(India) (Sri Lanka)	Chetan Anand; Niluka Karunaratne	21; 18	19; 21	21; 17
2	(India) (Sri Lanka)	Parupalli Kashyap; Dinuka Karunaratne	21; 11	21; 10
3	(India) (Sri Lanka)	Gurusai Dutt; Rajitha Sandeepana Dhanayaka	21; 13	21; 9
4	(India) (Sri Lanka)	Rupesh Kumar K. T. / Sanave Thomas; Diluka Karunaratne / Niluka Karunaratne	21; 14	18; 21	21; 12
5	(India) (Sri Lanka)	Akshay Dewalkar / Valiyaveetil Diju; Manami Hewa Hasitha / Rajitha Sandeepana Dhanayaka	21; 11	21; 8

Thailand
5
Nakhon Ratchasima Sports Complex, Court 3
22 February 2010, 14:00 UTC+7

Cambodia
0

			1	2	3
1	(Thailand) (Cambodia)	Tanongsak Saensomboonsuk; Chanpisey Vann	21; 4	21; 11
2	(Thailand) (Cambodia)	Suppanyu Avihingsanon; Veasna Troeung	21; 8	21; 10
3	(Thailand) (Cambodia)	Watchara Buranakuea; Mesa Vandy	21; 7	21; 2
4	(Thailand) (Cambodia)	Patiphat Chalardchaleam / Thitipong Lapho; Puthicheat Chindet / Nuon Sophorn	21; 2	21; 1
5	(Thailand) (Cambodia)	Tin Caballes / Nipitphon Phuangphuapet; Chanpisey Vann / Veasna Troeung	21; 11	21; 14

India
5
Nakhon Ratchasima Sports Complex, Court 2
23 February 2010, 13:30 UTC+7

Cambodia
0

			1	2	3
1	(India) (Cambodia)	Chetan Anand; Chanpisey Vann	21; 11	21; 10
2	(India) (Cambodia)	Arvind Bhat; Veasna Troeung	21; 4	21; 9
3	(India) (Cambodia)	Valiyaveetil Diju / Jishnu Sanyal; Dethputhicheat Chin / Mesa Vandy	21; 7	21; 9
4	(India) (Cambodia)	Anup Sridhar; Nuon Sophorn	21; 9	21; 13
5	(India) (Cambodia)	Rupesh Kumar K. T. / Sanave Thomas; Chanpisey Vann / Veasna Troeung	21; 10	21; 8

Thailand
4
Nakhon Ratchasima Sports Complex, Court 3
23 February 2010, 13:30 UTC+7

Sri Lanka
1

			1	2	3
1	(Thailand) (Sri Lanka)	Tanongsak Saensomboonsuk; Niluka Karunaratne	21; 19	21; 14
2	(Thailand) (Sri Lanka)	Suppanyu Avihingsanon; Dinuka Karunaratne	21; 19	21; 17
3	(Thailand) (Sri Lanka)	Watchara Buranakuea; Rajitha Sandeepana Dhanayaka	21; 5	18; 21	21; 10
4	(Thailand) (Sri Lanka)	Patiphat Chalardchaleam / Thitipong Lapho; Dinuka Karunaratne / Niluka Karunaratne	21; 10	19; 21	21; 14
5	(Thailand) (Sri Lanka)	Nipitphon Phuangphuapet / Tanongsak Saensomboonsuk; Manami Hewa Hasitha / Rajitha Sandeepana Dhanayaka	19; 21	14; 21

Sri Lanka
5
Nakhon Ratchasima Sports Complex, Court 2
24 February 2010, 13:30 UTC+7

Cambodia
0

			1	2	3
1	(Sri Lanka) (Cambodia)	Niluka Karunaratne; Chanpisey Vann	21; 7	21; 1
2	(Sri Lanka) (Cambodia)	Dinuka Karunaratne; Veasna Troeung	21; 9	21; 6
3	(Sri Lanka) (Cambodia)	Rajitha Sandeepana Dhanayaka; Nuon Sophorn	21; 14	21; 8
4	(Sri Lanka) (Cambodia)	Dinuka Karunaratne / Niluka Karunaratne; Chanpisey Vann / Veasna Troeung	21; 14	21; 6
5	(Sri Lanka) (Cambodia)	Rajitha Sandeepana Dhanayaka / Manami Hewa Hasitha; Dethputhicheat Chin / Mesa Vandy	21; 14	21; 14

India
3
Nakhon Ratchasima Sports Complex, Court 3
24 February 2010, 13:30 UTC+7

Thailand
2

			1	2	3
1	(India) (Thailand)	Chetan Anand; Tanongsak Saensomboonsuk	18; 21	14; 21
2	(India) (Thailand)	Rupesh Kumar K. T. / Sanave Thomas; Patiphat Chalardchaleam / Thitipong Laphio	19; 21	20; 22
3	(India) (Thailand)	Arvind Bhat; Suppanyu Avihingsanon	21; 15	21; 16
4	(India) (Thailand)	Akshay Dewalkar / Valiyaveetil Diju; Tin Caballes / Nipitphon Phuangphuapet	16; 21	21; 18	21; 14
5	(India) (Thailand)	Gurusai Dutt; Watchara Buranakuea	21; 6	21; 13

==== Group D ====
Pos	Team	Pld	W	L	MF	MA	MD	GF	GA	GD	PF	PA	PD	Pts	Qualification
1	South Korea	2	2	0	10	0	+10	20	1	+19	434	266	+168	2	Knockout stage
2	Japan	2	1	1	5	5	0	11	10	+1	383	315	+68	1	Knockout stage
3	Laos	2	0	2	0	10	−10	0	20	−20	184	420	−236	0	

Source: BWF

Japan
5
Nakhon Ratchasima Sports Complex, Court 3
22 February 2010, 09:00 UTC+7

Laos
0

			1	2	3
1	(Japan) (Laos)	Kenichi Tago; Phakornkham Fongmalayseng	21; 7	21; 7
2	(Japan) (Laos)	Hirokatsu Hashimoto / Noriyasu Hirata; Mouksavanh Lomany / Vanhpasith Philavanh	21; 6	21; 7
3	(Japan) (Laos)	Kazushi Yamada; Bounphasone Doungvilay	21; 12	21; 10
4	(Japan) (Laos)	Hiroyuki Endo / Yoshiteru Hirobe; Phonepadit Phengsakoun / Anousone Sihalath	21; 9	21; 7
5	(Japan) (Laos)	Shōji Satō; Phonepasith Phengchunseng	21; 9	21; 17

South Korea
5
Nakhon Ratchasima Sports Complex, Court 3
23 February 2010, 09:00 UTC+7

Laos
0

			1	2	3
1	(South Korea) (Laos)	Park Sung-hwan; Phonepasith Phengchunseng	21; 9	21; 11
2	(South Korea) (Laos)	Ko Sung-hyun / Yoo Yeon-seong; Phakornkham Fongmalayseng / Vanhpasith Philavanh	21; 13	21; 8
3	(South Korea) (Laos)	Son Wan-ho; Bounphasone Doungvilay	21; 9	21; 6
4	(South Korea) (Laos)	Hwang Ji-man / Kim Gi-jung; Mouksavanh Lomany / Anousone Sihalath	21; 11	21; 16
5	(South Korea) (Laos)	Choi Ho-jin; Phonepadit Phengsakoun	21; 5	21; 5

Japan
0
Nakhon Ratchasima Sports Complex, Court 3
24 February 2010, 09:00 UTC+7

South Korea
5

			1	2	3
1	(Japan) (South Korea)	Sho Sasaki; Park Sung-hwan	14; 21	8; 21
2	(Japan) (South Korea)	Kenichi Hayakawa / Kenta Kazuno; Hwang Ji-man / Jung Jae-sung	17; 21	14; 21
3	(Japan) (South Korea)	Kazushi Yamada; Son Wan-ho	19; 21	14; 21
4	(Japan) (South Korea)	Hiroyuki Endo / Yoshiteru Hirobe; Ko Sung-hyun / Yoo Yeon-seong	21; 13	15; 21	19; 21
5	(Japan) (South Korea)	Shōji Satō; Kim Sa-rang	12; 21	20; 22

=== Knockout stage ===
==== Bracket ====
Quarter-finals
A1	Indonesia	3
C2	Thailand	0
B1	Chinese Taipei	1
D2	Japan	3
D1	South Korea	3
B2	Hong Kong	1
A2	Vietnam	0
C1	India	3

Semi-finals
A1	Indonesia	3
D2	Japan	0
D1	South Korea	3
C1	India	0

Final
A1	Indonesia	3
D1	South Korea	2
Third place
D2	Japan	2
C1	India	3

==== Quarter-finals ====
Hong Kong
1
Nakhon Ratchasima Sports Complex, Court 2
25 February 2010, 09:00 UTC+7

South Korea
3

			1	2	3
1	(Hong Kong) (South Korea)	Hu Yun; Park Sung-hwan	13; 21	4; 21
2	(Hong Kong) (South Korea)	Yohan Hadikusumo Wiratama / Wong Wai Hong; Hwang Ji-man / Jung Jae-sung	21; 18	19; 21	17; 21
3	(Hong Kong) (South Korea)	Chan Yan Kit; Kim Sa-rang	21; 17	21; 18
4	(Hong Kong) (South Korea)	Leung Chun Yiu / Lo Lok-kei; Ko Sung-hyun / Yoo Yeon-seong	14; 21	12; 21
5	(Hong Kong) (South Korea)	Wong Wing Ki; Choi Ho-jin				not played

Vietnam
0
Nakhon Ratchasima Sports Complex, Court 4
25 February 2010, 09:00 UTC+7

India
3

			1	2	3
1	(Vietnam) (India)	Nguyễn Hoàng Nam; Parupalli Kashyap	22; 20	10; 21	18; 21
2	(Vietnam) (India)	Phạm Cao Hiếu; Arvind Bhat	21; 16	7; 21	10; 21
3	(Vietnam) (India)	Huỳnh Vĩnh; Anup Sridhar	13; 21	6; 21
4	(Vietnam) (India)	Dương Bảo Đức / Phạm Cao Hiếu; Rupesh Kumar K. T. / Sanave Thomas				not played
5	(Vietnam) (India)	Huỳnh Vĩnh / Nguyễn Hoàng Nam; Chetan Anand / Valiyaveetil Diju				not played

Indonesia
3
Nakhon Ratchasima Sports Complex, Court 2
25 February 2010, 17:30 UTC+7

Thailand
0

			1	2	3
1	(Indonesia) (Thailand)	Taufik Hidayat; Tanongsak Saensomboonsuk	21; 15	21; 19
2	(Indonesia) (Thailand)	Markis Kido / Alvent Yulianto; Patiphat Chalardchaleam / Thitipong Lapho	21; 12	21; 16
3	(Indonesia) (Thailand)	Sony Dwi Kuncoro; Suppanyu Avihingsanon	21; 10	21; 12
4	(Indonesia) (Thailand)	Yonathan Suryatama Dasuki / Rian Sukmawan; Tin Caballes / Nipitphon Phuangphuapet				not played
5	(Indonesia) (Thailand)	Simon Santoso; Watchara Buranakuea				not played

Chinese Taipei
1
Nakhon Ratchasima Sports Complex, Court 4
25 February 2010, 17:30 UTC+7

Japan
3

			1	2	3
1	(Chinese Taipei) (Japan)	Hsieh Yu-hsing; Kenichi Tago	14; 21	12; 21
2	(Chinese Taipei) (Japan)	Chen Hung-ling / Lin Yu-lang; Hirokatsu Hashimoto / Noriyasu Hirata	11; 21	21; 19	20; 22
3	(Chinese Taipei) (Japan)	Hsueh Hsuan-yi; Kazushi Yamada	21; 17	21; 16
4	(Chinese Taipei) (Japan)	Fang Chieh-min / Lee Sheng-mu; Kenichi Hayakawa / Kenta Kazuno	17; 21	15; 21
5	(Chinese Taipei) (Japan)	Hsu Jen-hao; Shōji Satō				not played

==== Semi-finals ====
Indonesia
3
Nakhon Ratchasima Sports Complex, Court 2
26 February 2010, 17:30 UTC+7

Japan
0

			1	2	3
1	(Indonesia) (Japan)	Taufik Hidayat; Kenichi Tago	21; 16	21; 23	21; 18
2	(Indonesia) (Japan)	Markis Kido / Alvent Yulianto; Hirokatsu Hashimoto / Noriyasu Hirata	21; 17	21; 19
3	(Indonesia) (Japan)	Sony Dwi Kuncoro; Sho Sasaki	21; 18	21; 11
4	(Indonesia) (Japan)	Yonathan Suryatama Dasuki / Rian Sukmawan; Kenichi Hayakawa / Kenta Kazuno				not played
5	(Indonesia) (Japan)	Simon Santoso; Shōji Satō				not played

India
1
Nakhon Ratchasima Sports Complex, Court 3
26 February 2010, 17:30 UTC+7

South Korea
3

			1	2	3
1	(India) (South Korea)	Parupalli Kashyap; Park Sung-hwan	16; 21	17; 21
2	(India) (South Korea)	Akshay Dewalkar / Sanave Thomas; Jung Jae-sung / Hwang Ji-man	10; 21	20; 22
3	(India) (South Korea)	Arvind Bhat; Son Wan-ho	21; 13	21; 15
4	(India) (South Korea)	Valiyaveetil Diju / Rupesh Kumar K. T. Ko Sung-hyun / Yoo Yeon-seong	21; 16	15; 21	9; 21
5	(India) (South Korea)	Anup Sridhar; Choi Ho-jin				not played

==== Third place ====
Japan
2
Nakhon Ratchasima Sports Complex, Court 2
27 February 2010, 09:00 UTC+7

India
3

			1	2	3
1	(Japan) (India)	Sho Sasaki; Chetan Anand	16; 21	21; 23
2	(Japan) (India)	Hirokatsu Hashimoto / Noriyasu Hirata; Rupesh Kumar K. T. / Sanave Thomas	19; 21	21; 18	15; 21
3	(Japan) (India)	Kazushi Yamada; Arvind Bhat	21; 15	14; 21	21; 7
4	(Japan) (India)	Kenichi Hayakawa / Kenta Kazuno; Akshay Dewalkar / Valiyaveetil Diju	17; 21	21; 16	21; 19
5	(Japan) (India)	Shōji Satō; Anup Sridhar	7; 21	21; 19	22; 24

==== Final ====
Indonesia
3
Nakhon Ratchasima Sports Complex, Court 2
27 February 2010, 17:30 UTC+7

South Korea
2

			1	2	3
1	(Indonesia) (South Korea)	Taufik Hidayat; Park Sung-hwan	21; 19	21; 15
2	(Indonesia) (South Korea)	Markis Kido / Alvent Yulianto; Ko Sung-hyun / Yoo Yeon-seong	21; 14	19; 21	14; 21
3	(Indonesia) (South Korea)	Sony Dwi Kuncoro; Kim Sa-rang	21; 9	24; 22
4	(Indonesia) (South Korea)	Yonathan Suryatama Dasuki / Rian Sukmawan; Hwang Ji-man / Kim Gi-jung	21; 19	11; 21	12; 21
5	(Indonesia) (South Korea)	Simon Santoso; Choi Ho-jin	21; 18	21; 19

=== Qualified teams ===
- Indonesia (23rd appearance)
- South Korea (14th appearance)
- India (8th appearance)
- Japan (10th appearance)

== Women's team ==
All times are Indochina Time (UTC+08:00).

=== Group stage ===
==== Group X ====
Pos	Team	Pld	W	L	MF	MA	MD	GF	GA	GD	PF	PA	PD	Pts	Qualification
1	Indonesia	4	4	0	17	3	+14	34	9	+25	873	602	+271	4	Knockout stage
2	South Korea	4	3	1	13	7	+6	30	15	+15	877	687	+190	3	Knockout stage
3	Thailand	4	2	2	10	10	0	24	24	0	841	873	−32	2	
4	Singapore	4	1	3	10	10	0	22	23	−1	810	792	+18	1	
5	Sri Lanka	4	0	4	0	20	−20	1	40	−39	411	858	−447	0	

Source: BWF

South Korea
5
Nakhon Ratchasima Sports Complex, Court 1
22 February 2010, 18:00 UTC+7

Sri Lanka
0

			1	2	3
1	(South Korea) (Sri Lanka)	Bae Seung-hee; Thilini Jayasinghe	21; 9	21; 8
2	(South Korea) (Sri Lanka)	Kim Moon-hi; Achini Ratnasiri	21; 13	23; 21
3	(South Korea) (Sri Lanka)	Sung Ji-hyun; Lekha Shehani	21; 7	21; 13
4	(South Korea) (Sri Lanka)	Ha Jung-eun / Yoo Hyun-young; Achini Ratnasiri / Upuli Weerasinghe	21; 4	21; 10
5	(South Korea) (Sri Lanka)	Jung Kyung-eun / Kim Min-jung; Thilini Jayasinghe / Lekha Shehani	21; 5	21; 9

Indonesia
3
Nakhon Ratchasima Sports Complex, Court 2
22 February 2010, 18:00 UTC+7

Singapore
2

			1	2	3
1	(Indonesia) (Singapore)	Adriyanti Firdasari; Zhang Beiwen	27; 29	20; 22
2	(Indonesia) (Singapore)	Nitya Krishinda Maheswari / Greysia Polii; Shinta Mulia Sari / Yao Lei	21; 15	21; 16
3	(Indonesia) (Singapore)	Maria Febe Kusumastuti; Xing Aiying	14; 21	19; 21
4	(Indonesia) (Singapore)	Shendy Puspa Irawati / Liliyana Natsir; Frances Liu / Vanessa Neo	21; 15	21; 12
5	(Indonesia) (Singapore)	Maria Kristin Yulianti; Fu Mingtian	21; 4	21; 9

Thailand
5
Nakhon Ratchasima Sports Complex, Court 1
23 February 2010, 17:30 UTC+7

Sri Lanka
0

			1	2	3
1	(Thailand) (Sri Lanka)	Ratchanok Intanon; Thilini Jayasinghe	21; 9	21; 10
2	(Thailand) (Sri Lanka)	Nitchaon Jindapol; Achini Ratnasiri	21; 10	21; 9
3	(Thailand) (Sri Lanka)	Kewalin Akarakulchai; Lekha Shehani	21; 16	21; 14
4	(Thailand) (Sri Lanka)	Chayanit Chaladchalam / Pijitjan Wangpaiboonkij; Achini Ratnasiri / Upuli Weerasinghe	21; 14	21; 10
5	(Thailand) (Sri Lanka)	Savitree Amitrapai / Vacharaporn Munkit; Thilini Jayasinghe / Lekha Shehani	21; 6	21; 16

South Korea
4
Nakhon Ratchasima Sports Complex, Court 2
23 February 2010, 17:30 UTC+7

Singapore
1

			1	2	3
1	(South Korea) (Singapore)	Bae Seung-hee; Zhang Beiwen	22; 24	19; 21
2	(South Korea) (Singapore)	Kim Min-jung / Lee Hyo-jung; Shinta Mulia Sari / Yao Lei	22; 20	21; 12
3	(South Korea) (Singapore)	Bae Yeon-ju; Xing Aiying	21; 9	21; 15
4	(South Korea) (Singapore)	Ha Jung-eun / Lee Kyung-won; Frances Liu / Vanessa Neo	21; 11	21; 8
5	(South Korea) (Singapore)	Sung Ji-hyun; Fu Mingtian	21; 16	21; 14

Indonesia
5
Nakhon Ratchasima Sports Complex, Court 1
24 February 2010, 17:30 UTC+7

Sri Lanka
0

			1	2	3
1	(Indonesia) (Sri Lanka)	Adriyanti Firdasari; Thilini Jayasinghe	21; 6	21; 9
2	(Indonesia) (Sri Lanka)	Maria Febe Kusumastuti; Achini Ratnasiri	21; 8	21; 8
3	(Indonesia) (Sri Lanka)	Aprilia Yuswandari; Lekha Shehani	21; 9	21; 8
4	(Indonesia) (Sri Lanka)	Anneke Feinya Agustin / Meiliana Jauhari; Achini Ratnasiri / Upuli Weerasinghe	21; 14	21; 8
5	(Indonesia) (Sri Lanka)	Shendy Puspa Irawati / Nitya Krishinda Maheswari; Thilini Jayasinghe / Lekha Shehani	21; 5	21; 5

South Korea
2
Nakhon Ratchasima Sports Complex, Court 2
24 February 2010, 17:30 UTC+7

Thailand
3

			1	2	3
1	(South Korea) (Thailand)	Bae Seung-hee; Ratchanok Intanon	21; 13	13; 21	19; 21
2	(South Korea) (Thailand)	Lee Hyo-jung / Lee Kyung-won; Savitree Amitrapai / Vacharaporn Munkit	22; 20	22; 24	21; 16
3	(South Korea) (Thailand)	Kim Moon-hi; Nitchaon Jindapol	21; 18	19; 21	13; 21
4	(South Korea) (Thailand)	Jung Kyung-eun / Kim Min-jung; Ratchanok Intanon / Pijitjan Wangpaiboonkj	21; 9	21; 10
5	(South Korea) (Thailand)	Bae Yeon-ju; Kewalin Akarakulchai	21; 13	21; 8

Indonesia
5
Nakhon Ratchasima Sports Complex, Court 1
25 February 2010, 17:30 UTC+7

Thailand
0

			1	2	3
1	(Indonesia) (Thailand)	Adriyanti Firdasari; Ratchanok Intanon	21; 10	29; 27
2	(Indonesia) (Thailand)	Nitya Krishinda Maheswari / Greysia Polii; Savitree Amitrapai / Vacharaporn Munkit	21; 16	21; 17
3	(Indonesia) (Thailand)	Maria Kristin Yulianti; Nitchaon Jindapol	21; 13	16; 21	21; 10
4	(Indonesia) (Thailand)	Shendy Puspa Irawati / Liliyana Natsir; Chayanit Chaladchalam / Preyaporn Vechsuwannapat	21; 5	21; 11
5	(Indonesia) (Thailand)	Aprilia Yuswandari; Kewalin Akarakulchai	21; 12	21; 16

Singapore
5
Nakhon Ratchasima Sports Complex, Court 3
25 February 2010, 17:30 UTC+7

Sri Lanka
0

			1	2	3
1	(Singapore) (Sri Lanka)	Zhang Beiwen; Thilini Jayasinghe	21; 11	21; 6
2	(Singapore) (Sri Lanka)	Xing Aiying; Achini Ratnasiri	21; 15	21; 6
3	(Singapore) (Sri Lanka)	Chen Jiayuan; Lekha Shehani	21; 6	21; 17
4	(Singapore) (Sri Lanka)	Fu Mingtian / Vanessa Neo; Achini Ratnasiri / Upuli Weerasinghe	21; 11	16; 21	21; 9
5	(Singapore) (Sri Lanka)	Shinta Mulia Sari / Yao Lei; Thilini Jayasinghe / Lekha Shehani	21; 4	21; 12

Thailand
3
Nakhon Ratchasima Sports Complex, Court 2
26 February 2010, 13:30 UTC+7

Singapore
2

			1	2	3
1	(Thailand) (Singapore)	Ratchanok Intanon; Zhang Beiwen	21; 10	13; 21	22; 20
2	(Thailand) (Singapore)	Savitree Amitrapai / Peeraya Munkitamorn; Shinta Mulia Sari / Yao Lei	17; 21	21; 18	21; 17
3	(Thailand) (Singapore)	Nitchaon Jindapol; Xing Aiying	21; 16	21; 19
4	(Thailand) (Singapore)	Pijitjan Wangpaiboonkj / Chayanit Chaladchalam; Fu Mingtian / Vanessa Neo	16; 21	26; 24	13; 21
5	(Thailand) (Singapore)	Kewalin Akarakulchai; Chen Jiayuan	10; 21	22; 20	14; 21

South Korea
2
Nakhon Ratchasima Sports Complex, Court 3
26 February 2010, 13:30 UTC+7

Indonesia
3

			1	2	3
1	(South Korea) (Indonesia)	Bae Seung-hee; Adriyanti Firdasari	17; 21	21; 15	15; 21
2	(South Korea) (Indonesia)	Ha Jung-eun / Kim Min-jung; Meiliana Jauhari / Greysia Polii	15; 21	14; 21
3	(South Korea) (Indonesia)	Bae Yeon-ju; Maria Febe Kusumastuti	21; 10	21; 14
4	(South Korea) (Indonesia)	Lee Hyo-jung / Lee Kyung-won; Shendy Puspa Irawati / Liliyana Natsir	12; 21	21; 16	15; 21
5	(South Korea) (Indonesia)	Sung Ji-hyun; Aprilia Yuswandari	18; 21	10; 21

==== Group Y ====
Pos	Team	Pld	W	L	MF	MA	MD	GF	GA	GD	PF	PA	PD	Pts	Qualification
1	Japan	4	4	0	17	3	+14	35	8	+27	857	652	+205	4	Knockout stage
2	India	4	3	1	12	8	+4	26	18	+8	794	725	+69	3	Knockout stage
3	Chinese Taipei	4	2	2	11	9	+2	23	19	+4	784	695	+89	2	
4	Hong Kong	4	1	3	10	10	0	22	21	+1	759	726	+33	1	
5	Philippines	4	0	4	0	20	−20	0	40	−40	444	840	−396	0	

Source: BWF

Japan
5
Nakhon Ratchasima Sports Complex, Court 1
22 February 2010, 09:00 UTC+8

Philippines
0

			1	2	3
1	(Japan) (Philippines)	Ai Goto; Malvinne Alcala	21; 13	21; 16
2	(Japan) (Philippines)	Sayaka Sato; Gelita Castilo	21; 13	21; 13
3	(Japan) (Philippines)	Yu Hirayama; Fatima Cruz	21; 5	21; 11
4	(Japan) (Philippines)	Mizuki Fujii / Reika Kakiiwa; Malvinne Alcala / Gelita Castilo	21; 6	21; 14
5	(Japan) (Philippines)	Shizuka Matsuo / Mami Naito; Fatima Cruz / Dia Nicole Magno	21; 8	21; 9

Hong Kong
2
Nakhon Ratchasima Sports Complex, Court 2
22 February 2010, 09:00 UTC+8

India
3

			1	2	3
1	(Hong Kong) (India)	Zhou Mi; Saina Nehwal	21; 14	10; 21	21; 23
2	(Hong Kong) (India)	Yip Pui Yin; Sayali Gokhale	21; 13	21; 11
3	(Hong Kong) (India)	Chan Tsz Ka; Trupti Murgunde	18; 21	16; 21
4	(Hong Kong) (India)	Tse Ying Suet / Zhou Mi; Jwala Gutta / Ashwini Ponnappa	13; 21	16; 21
5	(Hong Kong) (India)	Chau Hoi Wah / Chan Tsz Ka; Aparna Balan / Shruti Kurien	21; 9	21; 13

Chinese Taipei
5
Nakhon Ratchasima Sports Complex, Court 1
23 February 2010, 09:00 UTC+8

Philippines
0

			1	2	3
1	(Chinese Taipei) (Philippines)	Chen Hsiao-huan; Malvinne Alcala	21; 19	21; 10
2	(Chinese Taipei) (Philippines)	Hung Shih-han; Gelita Castilo	21; 11	21; 11
3	(Chinese Taipei) (Philippines)	Pai Hsiao-ma; Fatima Cruz	21; 8	21; 6
4	(Chinese Taipei) (Philippines)	Chang Hsin-yun / Wang Pei-rong; Malvinne Alcala / Gelita Castilo	21; 16	21; 17
5	(Chinese Taipei) (Philippines)	Chiang Kai-hsin / Hsieh Pei-chen; Fatima Cruz / Dia Nicole Magno	21; 7	21; 9

Japan
4
Nakhon Ratchasima Sports Complex, Court 2
23 February 2010, 09:00 UTC+7

India
1

			1	2	3
1	(Japan) (India)	Ai Goto; Saina Nehwal	13; 21			retired
2	(Japan) (India)	Shizuka Matsuo / Mami Naito; Aparna Balan / Shruti Kurien	21; 18	17; 21	21; 14
3	(Japan) (India)	Sayaka Sato; Trupti Murgunde	21; 16	21; 19
4	(Japan) (India)	Miyuki Maeda / Satoko Suetsuna; Jwala Gutta / Ashwini Ponnappa	21; 13	13; 21	21; 12
5	(Japan) (India)	Eriko Hirose; Gayatri Vartak	21; 12	21; 7

Hong Kong
5
Nakhon Ratchasima Sports Complex, Court 1
24 February 2010, 09:00 UTC+7

Philippines
0

			1	2	3
1	(Hong Kong) (Philippines)	Zhou Mi; Malvinne Alcala	21; 16	21; 12
2	(Hong Kong) (Philippines)	Yip Pui Yin; Gelita Castilo	21; 9	21; 11
3	(Hong Kong) (Philippines)	Mong Kwan Yi; Fatima Cruz	21; 6	21; 11
4	(Hong Kong) (Philippines)	Chau Hoi Wah / Chan Tsz Ka; Malvinne Alcala / Gelita Castilo	21; 14	21; 18
5	(Hong Kong) (Philippines)	Poon Lok Yan / Tse Ying Suet; Fatima Cruz / Dia Nicole Magno	21; 6	21; 12

Japan
4
Nakhon Ratchasima Sports Complex, Court 2
24 February 2010, 09:00 UTC+7

Chinese Taipei
1

			1	2	3
1	(Japan) (Chinese Taipei)	Sayaka Sato; Chen Hsiao-huan	21; 18	22; 20
2	(Japan) (Chinese Taipei)	Mizuki Fujii / Reika Kakiiwa; Cheng Wen-hsing / Chien Yu-chin	14; 21	18; 21
3	(Japan) (Chinese Taipei)	Eriko Hirose; Hung Shih-han	21; 13	21; 16
4	(Japan) (Chinese Taipei)	Miyuki Maeda / Satoko Suetsuna; Chang Hsin-yun / Wang Pei-rong	21; 19	21; 17
5	(Japan) (Chinese Taipei)	Yu Hirayama; Pai Hsiao-ma	21; 14	21; 19

Hong Kong
2
Nakhon Ratchasima Sports Complex, Court 1
25 February 2010, 09:00 UTC+7

Chinese Taipei
3

			1	2	3
1	(Hong Kong) (Chinese Taipei)	Zhou Mi; Chen Hsiao-huan	21; 17	21; 16
2	(Hong Kong) (Chinese Taipei)	Yip Pui Yin; Hung Shih-han	21; 12	21; 17
3	(Hong Kong) (Chinese Taipei)	Chan Tsz Ka; Pai Hsiao-ma	14; 21	13; 21
4	(Hong Kong) (Chinese Taipei)	Poon Lok Yan / Tse Ying Suet; Cheng Wen-hsing / Chiang Kai-hsin	12; 21	13; 21
5	(Hong Kong) (Chinese Taipei)	Chau Hoi Wah / Chan Tsz Ka; Chien Yu-chin / Wang Pei-rong	13; 21	9; 21

India
5
Nakhon Ratchasima Sports Complex, Court 3
25 February 2010, 09:00 UTC+7

Philippines
0

			1	2	3
1	(India) (Philippines)	Saina Nehwal; Malvinne Alcala	21; 9	21; 13
2	(India) (Philippines)	Sayali Gokhale; Gelita Castilo	21; 9	21; 16
3	(India) (Philippines)	Trupti Murgunde; Dia Nicole Magno	21; 4	21; 8
4	(India) (Philippines)	Jwala Gutta / Ashwini Ponnappa; Malvinne Alcala / Gelita Castilo	21; 15	21; 11
5	(India) (Philippines)	Aparna Balan / Saina Nehwal; Fatima Cruz / Dia Nicole Magno	21; 9	21; 13

Japan
4
Nakhon Ratchasima Sports Complex, Court 1
26 February 2010, 09:00 UTC+7

Hong Kong
1

			1	2	3
1	(Japan) (Hong Kong)	Ai Goto; Yip Pui Yin	21; 18	15; 21	19; 21
2	(Japan) (Hong Kong)	Mizuki Fujii / Reika Kakiiwa; Chau Hoi Wah / Chan Tsz Ka	21; 13	21; 15
3	(Japan) (Hong Kong)	Sayaka Sato; Mong Kwan Yi	21; 13	21; 12
4	(Japan) (Hong Kong)	Mami Naito / Shizuka Matsuo; Poon Lok Yan / Tse Ying Suet	21; 15	12; 21	21; 15
5	(Japan) (Hong Kong)	Yu Hirayama; Chan Hung Yung	21; 13	21; 15

Chinese Taipei
2
Nakhon Ratchasima Sports Complex, Court 2
26 February 2010, 09:00 UTC+7

India
3

			1	2	3
1	(Chinese Taipei) (India)	Chen Hsiao-huan; Saina Nehwal	15; 21	14; 21
2	(Chinese Taipei) (India)	Chien Yu-chin / Wang Pei-rong; Aparna Balan / Shruti Kurien	11; 21	21; 14	21; 18
3	(Chinese Taipei) (India)	Hung Shih-han; Sayali Gokhale	21; 15	10; 21	21; 23
4	(Chinese Taipei) (India)	Chang Hsin-yun / Cheng Wen-hsing; Jwala Gutta / Ashwini Ponnappa	16; 21	16; 21
5	(Chinese Taipei) (India)	Pai Hsiao-ma; Trupti Murgunde	21; 14	21; 12

=== Knockout stage ===
Semi-finals
X2	South Korea	3
Y1	Japan	1
X1	Indonesia	3
Y2	India	0

Final
X2	South Korea	3
X1	Indonesia	2
Third place
Y1	Japan	3
Y2	India	2

==== Semi-finals ====
South Korea
3
Nakhon Ratchasima Sports Complex, Court 2
27 February 2010, 13:30 UTC+7

Japan
1

			1	2	3
1	(South Korea) (Japan)	Bae Seung-hee; Ai Goto	10; 21	19; 21
2	(South Korea) (Japan)	Ha Jung-eun / Lee Kyung-won; Mizuki Fujii / Reika Kakiiwa	23; 21	21; 14
3	(South Korea) (Japan)	Bae Yeon-ju; Sayaka Sato	21; 13	21; 12
4	(South Korea) (Japan)	Lee Hyo-jung / Jung Kyung-eun; Miyuki Maeda / Satoko Suetsuna	21; 14	21; 18
5	(South Korea) (Japan)	Sung Ji-hyun; Eriko Hirose				not played

Indonesia
3
Nakhon Ratchasima Sports Complex, Court 3
27 February 2010, 13:30 UTC+7

India
2

			1	2	3
1	(Indonesia) (India)	Adriyanti Firdasari; Saina Nehwal	21; 16	21; 15
2	(Indonesia) (India)	Nitya Krishinda Maheswari / Greysia Polii; Aparna Balan / Shruti Kurien	21; 16	21; 15
3	(Indonesia) (India)	Maria Kristin Yulianti; Sayali Gokhale	24; 22	21; 12
4	(Indonesia) (India)	Shendy Puspa Irawati / Liliyana Natsir; Jwala Gutta / Ashwini Ponnappa				not played
5	(Indonesia) (India)	Aprilia Yuswandari; Trupti Murgunde				not played

==== Third place ====
India
2
Nakhon Ratchasima Sports Complex, Court 3
28 February 2010, 09:00 UTC+7

Japan
3

			1	2	3
1	(India) (Japan)	Saina Nehwal; Ai Goto	21; 17	21; 16
2	(India) (Japan)	Jwala Gutta / Ashwini Ponnappa; Mizuki Fujii / Reika Kakiiwa	16; 21	15; 21
3	(India) (Japan)	Sayali Gokhale; Eriko Hirose	20; 22	13; 21
4	(India) (Japan)	Trupti Murgunde; Yu Hirayama	21; 8	21; 16
5	(India) (Japan)	Aparna Balan / Saina Nehwal; Miyuki Maeda / Satoko Suetsuna	16; 21	10; 21

==== Final ====
Indonesia
2
Nakhon Ratchasima Sports Complex, Court 1
28 February 2010, 13:30 UTC+7

South Korea
3

			1	2	3
1	(Indonesia) (South Korea)	Adriyanti Firdasari; Bae Seung-hee	21; 10	21; 13
2	(Indonesia) (South Korea)	Meiliana Jauhari / Greysia Polii; Ha Jung-eun / Lee Kyung-won	21; 14	21; 12
3	(Indonesia) (South Korea)	Maria Kristin Yulianti; Bae Yeon-ju	21; 17	14; 21	7; 21
4	(Indonesia) (South Korea)	Shendy Puspa Irawati / Liliyana Natsir; Jung Kyung-eun / Lee Hyo-jung	21; 13	12; 21	13; 21
5	(Indonesia) (South Korea)	Aprilia Yuswandari; Sung Ji-hyun	12; 21	14; 21

=== Qualified teams ===
- South Korea (14th appearance)
- Indonesia (20th appearance)
- Japan (16th appearance)
- India (3rd appearance)
