= 2004 Asian Junior Badminton Championships – Boys' team =

Badminton championship in Hwacheon, South Korea

Boys' team at the 2004 Asian Junior Badminton Championships
- Venue: Hwacheon Indoor Stadium
- Location: Hwacheon, Malaysia
- Dates: 12–15 July 2004

The boys' team tournament at the 2004 Asian Junior Badminton Championships took place from 12 to 15 July 2004 at the Hwacheon Indoor Stadium in Hwacheon, South Korea. A total of 13 countries competed in this event.

== Results ==
=== Bracket ===
Round of 16
Iran
Singapore	w/o
Vietnam	0
Chinese Taipei	3
Japan	3
India	0
Maldives	0
Indonesia	3
Hong Kong	3
Sri Lanka	0

Quarter-finals
China	3
Singapore	0
Malaysia	3
Chinese Taipei	0
Japan	2
Indonesia	3
Hong Kong	0
South Korea	3

Semi-finals
China	3
Malaysia	0
Indonesia	0
South Korea	3

Final
China	3
South Korea	1
