= 2001 Asian Junior Badminton Championships – Girls' team =

Badminton championship in Taipei, Taiwan

Girls' team at the 2001 Asian Junior Badminton Championships
- Venue: Taipei Gymnasium
- Location: Taipei, Taiwan
- Dates: 8–10 July 2001

The girls' team tournament at the 2001 Asian Junior Badminton Championships took place from 8 to 10 July 2001 at the Taipei Gymnasium in Taipei, Taiwan. A total of 10 countries competed in this event.

== Results ==
=== Bracket ===
Round of 16
Indonesia	3
Sri Lanka	0
Japan	3
Vietnam	1

Quarter-finals
South Korea	3
India	0
Malaysia	0
Indonesia	3
Japan	2
Thailand	3
North Korea	0
Chinese Taipei	3

Semi-finals
South Korea	3
Indonesia	2
Thailand	1
Chinese Taipei	3

Final
South Korea	3
Chinese Taipei	0
