= 2004 Asian Junior Badminton Championships – Girls' team =

Badminton championship in Hwacheon, South Korea

Girls' team at the 2004 Asian Junior Badminton Championships
- Venue: Hwacheon Indoor Stadium
- Location: Hwacheon, Malaysia
- Dates: 12–15 July 2004

The girls' team tournament at the 2004 Asian Junior Badminton Championships took place from 12 to 15 July 2004 at the Hwacheon Indoor Stadium in Hwacheon, South Korea. A total of 10 countries competed in this event.

== Results ==
=== Bracket ===
Round of 16
Vietnam	0
Hong Kong	3
Japan	3
Singapore	0

Quarter-finals
South Korea	3
India	0
Chinese Taipei	3
Hong Kong	0
Japan	2
Indonesia	3
Sri Lanka	0
China	3

Semi-finals
South Korea	3
Chinese Taipei	0
Indonesia	0
China	3

Final
South Korea	1
China	3
