= Bangladesh national badminton team =

National badminton team

Bangladesh
- Association: Bangladesh Badminton Federation (BBF)
- Confederation: BA (Asia)
- President: Abdul Malek

BWF ranking
- Current ranking: 130 ▼18 (2 January 2024)
- Highest ranking: 70 (5 January 2017)

Asian Men's Team Championships
- Appearances: 4 (first in 1976)
- Best result: Round of 16 (1976, 1983)

The Bangladesh national badminton team (Bengali: বাংলাদেশ জাতীয় ব্যাডমিন্টন দল) represents Bangladesh in international badminton team competitions and is controlled by the Bangladesh Badminton Federation, the governing body for badminton in Bangladesh. The Bangladeshi junior mixed team competed in the 2011 Asian Junior Badminton Championships.

Bangladesh has also participated in the South Asian Games. The men's team and women's team both achieved a semifinal bronze position in 2010 and 2016.

== History ==
Badminton was introduced to Bangladesh in the 1900s by the British. At the time, the sport was only played throughout urban areas. In 1972, the Bangladesh Badminton Federation was formed and the sport started to gain popularity. The national team competed in one of their first international team events at the 2004 South Asian Games.

=== Men's team ===
The Bangladeshi men's team first competed in the 2004 South Asian Games but were eliminated in the quarter-finals. In 2010, the team competed at the 2010 South Asian Games as host team and finished in third place. The team were eliminated semi-finals at the next edition of the South Asian Games in 2016 after losing 3–0 to Sri Lanka.

=== Women's team ===
The women's team competed alongside the men's team at the 2004 South Asian Games. The team won bronze consecutively at the 2010 South Asian Games and the 2016 South Asian Games.

== Competitive record ==
=== Thomas Cup ===
Year	Round	Pos
1949	Part of Pakistan	
1952	Part of Pakistan	
1955	Part of Pakistan	
1958	Part of Pakistan	
1961	Part of Pakistan	
1964	Part of Pakistan	
1967	Part of Pakistan	
1970	Part of Pakistan	
1973	Did not enter	
1976	Did not enter	
1979	Did not enter	
1982	Did not enter	
1984	Did not enter	
1986	Did not enter	
1988	Did not enter	
1990	Did not enter	
1992	Did not enter	
1994	Did not enter	
1996	Did not enter	
1998	Did not enter	
2000	Did not enter	
2002	Did not enter	
2004	Did not enter	
2006	Did not enter	
2008	Did not enter	
2010	Did not enter	
2012	Did not enter	
2014	Did not enter	
2016	Did not enter	
2018	Did not enter	
2020	Did not enter	
2022	Did not enter	
2024	TBD	
2026	TBD	
2028	TBD	
2030	TBD	

=== Uber Cup ===
Year	Round	Pos
1957	Part of Pakistan	
1960	Part of Pakistan	
1963	Part of Pakistan	
1966	Part of Pakistan	
1969	Part of Pakistan	
1972	Did not enter	
1975	Did not enter	
1978	Did not enter	
1981	Did not enter	
1984	Did not enter	
1986	Did not enter	
1988	Did not enter	
1990	Did not enter	
1992	Did not enter	
1994	Did not enter	
1996	Did not enter	
1998	Did not enter	
2000	Did not enter	
2002	Did not enter	
2004	Did not enter	
2006	Did not enter	
2008	Did not enter	
2010	Did not enter	
2012	Did not enter	
2014	Did not enter	
2016	Did not enter	
2018	Did not enter	
2020	Did not enter	
2022	Did not enter	
2024	TBD	
2026	TBD	
2028	TBD	
2030	TBD	

=== Sudirman Cup ===
Year	Round	Pos
1989	Did not enter	
1991	Did not enter	
1993	Did not enter	
1995	Did not enter	
1997	Did not enter	
1999	Did not enter	
2001	Did not enter	
2003	Did not enter	
2005	Did not enter	
2007	Did not enter	
2009	Did not enter	
2011	Did not enter	
2013	Did not enter	
2015	Did not enter	
2017	Did not enter	
2019	Did not enter	
2021	Did not enter	
2023	Did not enter	
2025	TBD	
2027	TBD	
2029	TBD	

=== WBF World Championships ===
==== Men's team ====
Year	Round	Pos
1979	Group stage	

==== Women's team ====
Year	Round	Pos
1979	Did not enter	

=== Commonwealth Games ===
==== Men's team ====
Year	Round	Pos
1998	Did not enter	

==== Women's team ====
Year	Round	Pos
1998	Did not enter	

==== Mixed team ====
Year	Round	Pos
1978	Did not enter	
1982	Did not enter	
1986	Did not enter	
1990	Did not enter	
1994	Did not enter	
2002	Did not enter	
2006	Did not enter	
2010	Did not enter	
2014	Did not enter	
2018	Did not enter	
2022	Did not enter	
2026	TBD	

=== Asian Games ===
==== Men's team ====
Year	Round	Pos
1962	Part of Pakistan	
1966	Part of Pakistan	
1970	Part of Pakistan	
1974	Did not enter	
1978	Did not enter	
1982	Did not enter	
1986	Did not enter	
1990	Did not enter	
1994	Did not enter	
1998	Did not enter	
2002	Did not enter	
2006	Did not enter	
2010	Did not enter	
2014	Did not enter	
2018	Did not enter	
2022	Did not enter	
2026	Round of 16	
2030	TBD	
2034	TBD	
2038	TBD	

==== Women's team ====
Year	Round	Pos
1962	Part of Pakistan	
1966	Part of Pakistan	
1970	Part of Pakistan	
1974	Did not enter	
1978	Did not enter	
1982	Did not enter	
1986	Did not enter	
1990	Did not enter	
1994	Did not enter	
1998	Did not enter	
2002	Did not enter	
2006	Did not enter	
2010	Did not enter	
2014	Did not enter	
2018	Did not enter	
2022	Did not enter	
2026	Did not enter	
2030	TBD	
2034	TBD	
2038	TBD	

=== Asian Team Championships ===
==== Men's team ====
Year	Round	Pos
1962	Part of Pakistan	
1965	Part of Pakistan	
1969	Part of Pakistan	
1971	Part of Pakistan	
1976	Round of 16	
1983	Round of 16	
1985	Did not enter	
1987	Did not enter	
1989	Group stage	
1993	Group stage	
2004	Did not enter	
2006	Did not enter	
2008	Did not enter	
2010	Did not enter	
2012	Did not enter	
2016	Did not enter	
2018	Did not enter	
2020	Did not enter	
2022	Did not enter	
2024	TBD	
2026	TBD	
2028	TBD	
2030	TBD	

==== Women's team ====
Year	Round	Pos
2004	Did not enter	
2006	Did not enter	
2008	Did not enter	
2010	Did not enter	
2012	Did not enter	
2016	Did not enter	
2018	Did not enter	
2020	Did not enter	
2022	Did not enter	
2024	TBD	
2026	TBD	
2028	TBD	
2030	TBD	

==== Mixed team ====
Year	Round	Pos
2017	Did not enter	
2019	Did not enter	
2023	Did not enter	
2025	TBD	
2027	TBD	
2029	TBD	

=== South Asian Games ===
==== Men's team ====
Year	Round	Pos
2004	Did not enter	
2006	Did not enter	
2010	Semi-finals	3rd
2016	Semi-finals	4th
2019	Quarter-finals	
2024	TBD	

==== Women's team ====
Year	Round	Pos
2004	Did not enter	
2006	Did not enter	
2010	Semi-finals	3rd
2016	Semi-finals	4th
2019	Quarter-finals	
2024	TBD	

== Junior competitive record ==
=== Suhandinata Cup ===
Year	Round	Pos
2000	Did not enter	
2002	Did not enter	
2004	Did not enter	
2006	Did not enter	
2007	Did not enter	
2008	Did not enter	
2009	Did not enter	
2010	Did not enter	
2011	Did not enter	
2012	Did not enter	
2013	Did not enter	
2014	Did not enter	
2015	Did not enter	
2016	Did not enter	
2017	Did not enter	
2018	Did not enter	
2019	Did not enter	
2022	Did not enter	
2023	Did not enter	
2024	TBD	

=== Asian Junior Team Championships ===
==== Boys' team ====
Year	Round	Pos
1997	Round of 32	
1998	Round of 32	
1999	Round of 32	
2000	Round of 16	
2001	Round of 16	
2002	Round of 32	
2004	Did not enter	
2005	Did not enter	

==== Girls' team ====
Year	Round	Pos
1997	Did not enter	
1998	Did not enter	
1999	Did not enter	
2000	Did not enter	
2001	Did not enter	
2002	Did not enter	
2004	Did not enter	
2005	Did not enter	

==== Mixed team ====
Year	Round	Pos
2006	Did not enter	
2007	Did not enter	
2008	Did not enter	
2009	Did not enter	
2010	Did not enter	
2011	Did not enter	
2012	Did not enter	
2013	Group stage	
2014	Did not enter	
2015	Did not enter	
2016	Did not enter	
2017	Did not enter	
2018	Did not enter	
2019	Did not enter	
2023	Group stage	
2024	TBD	
2025	TBD	

=== South Asian Junior Team Championships ===
==== Mixed team ====
Year	Round	Pos
2019	Group stage	

== Staff ==
The following list shows the coaching staff for the national badminton team of Bangladesh.

Name	Role
(Bangladesh) Enayetullah Khan	Coach
(Bangladesh) Ohiduzzaman Raju	Coach

== Players ==
=== Current squad ===
As of 2 January 2021

==== Men's team ====
Name	DoB/Age	Ranking of event		
Name	DoB/Age	MS	MD	XD
Gourab Singha	13 October 2003 (age 23)	-	665	-
Mohammad Salman Khan	27 October 1995 (age 31)	-	-	-
Zayan Alfat Sporsho	3 December 2008 (age 17)	-	-	-
Md. Abdul Hamid Lukman	15 July 2002 (age 24)	-	665	-
Al Amin Zumar	25 August 1999 (age 27)	-	-	-
Syed Saker Mohammad	16 February 2004 (age 22)	-	-	-

==== Women's team ====
Name	DoB/Age	Ranking of event		
Name	DoB/Age	WS	WD	XD
Bristy Khatun	17 October 1995 (age 31)	-	-	-
Urmi Akter	1 February 2003 (age 23)	-	-	-
Rasma Akter	24 June 2000 (age 26)	-	-	-
Alina Sultana	3 December 1984 (age 41)	-	-	-
Lika Podder	27 November 2002 (age 23)	-	-	-
Mst. Nasima Khatun	23 December 2005 (age 20)	-	-	-
