= Brunei national badminton team =

Brunei Darussalam
- Association: Brunei National Badminton Association (PBKBD)
- Confederation: BA (Asia)
- President: Mohd Zuno Kartono Haji Ali

BWF ranking
- Current ranking: 112 ▼3 (2 January 2024)
- Highest ranking: 91 (7 July 2014)

Asian Men's Team Championships
- Appearances: 2 (first in 1985)
- Best result: Round of 16 (1985)

The Brunei national badminton team (Malay: Pasukan badminton kebangsaan Brunei Darussalam; Jawi: ڤاسوكن بدمينتون كبڠسأن بروني دارالسلام) represents Brunei in international badminton competitions. It is controlled by the Brunei National Badminton Association. The Bruneian team competed in the Summer Universiade in 2007. The team was placed in Group D and finished in 20th place.

The Bruneian men's team only competed in badminton at the SEA Games two times, in 1999 where it was the host team and in 2001. Brunei has yet to win a medal in badminton. Brunei made their badminton debut at the Summer Olympics in 2016, when Jaspar Yu Woon Chai was called up to represent Brunei at the 2016 Rio Olympics men's singles event from a tripartite invitation.

Former Indonesian badminton player, Imay Hendra was called up to the national team as a doubles coach.

== History ==
=== Men's team ===
Brunei first competed in the qualifying rounds for the 1986 Thomas & Uber Cup in Bangkok. The team lost to Malaysia and Australia 0-5 in their group. In 1999, the Bruneian men's team debuted in the 1999 SEA Games as host nation. The home team lost 3–1 against Singapore but managed to scored their first win in a team event when Amran Kambar performed an upsetting defeat against Kendrick Lee 13–15, 15–10, 15–9. Brunei competed for a second time in the 2001 SEA Games but lost to Malaysia 3-0 in the quarter-finals.

=== Women's team ===
The Bruneian women's team entered the qualifying rounds for the 1986 Thomas & Uber Cup but withdrew from the competition.

=== Mixed team ===
Brunei competed in the 2007 Summer Universiade mixed team event. The team were placed into Group D but withdrew from the competition. The team placed 20th in the overall rankings. In 2023, Brunei competed in the mixed team event at the 2023 SEA Games. The team had a bye in the quarter-finals and entered the next round with a guaranteed bronze medal. The team then lost 3–0 in the semi-finals to Myanmar.

== Competitive record ==
=== Thomas Cup ===
Year	Round	Pos
1949	Did not enter	
1952	Did not enter	
1955	Did not enter	
1958	Did not enter	
1961	Did not enter	
1964	Did not enter	
1967	Did not enter	
1970	Did not enter	
1973	Did not enter	
1976	Did not enter	
1979	Did not enter	
1982	Did not enter	
1984	Withdrew	
1986	Did not qualify	
1988	Did not enter	
1990	Did not enter	
1992	Did not enter	
1994	Did not enter	
1996	Did not enter	
1998	Did not enter	
2000	Did not enter	
2002	Did not enter	
2004	Did not enter	
2006	Did not enter	
2008	Did not enter	
2010	Did not enter	
2012	Did not enter	
2014	Did not enter	
2016	Did not enter	
2018	Did not enter	
2020	Did not enter	
2022	Did not enter	
2024	Did not qualify	
2026	TBD	
2028	TBD	
2030	TBD	

=== Uber Cup ===
Year	Round	Pos
1957	Did not enter	
1960	Did not enter	
1963	Did not enter	
1966	Did not enter	
1969	Did not enter	
1972	Did not enter	
1975	Did not enter	
1978	Did not enter	
1981	Did not enter	
1984	Did not enter	
1986	Did not qualify	
1988	Did not enter	
1990	Did not enter	
1992	Did not enter	
1994	Did not enter	
1996	Did not enter	
1998	Did not enter	
2000	Did not enter	
2002	Did not enter	
2004	Did not enter	
2006	Did not enter	
2008	Did not enter	
2010	Did not enter	
2012	Did not enter	
2014	Did not enter	
2016	Did not enter	
2018	Did not enter	
2020	Did not enter	
2022	Did not enter	
2024	Did not enter	
2026	TBD	
2028	TBD	
2030	TBD	

=== Sudirman Cup ===
Year	Round	Pos
1989	Did not enter	
1991	Did not enter	
1993	Did not enter	
1995	Did not enter	
1997	Did not enter	
1999	Did not enter	
2001	Did not enter	
2003	Did not enter	
2005	Did not enter	
2007	Did not enter	
2009	Did not enter	
2011	Did not enter	
2013	Did not enter	
2015	Did not enter	
2017	Did not enter	
2019	Did not enter	
2021	Did not enter	
2023	Did not enter	
2025	TBD	
2027	TBD	
2029	TBD	

=== Commonwealth Games ===
==== Men's team ====
Year	Round	Pos
1998	Group stage	

==== Women's team ====
Year	Round	Pos
1998	Did not enter	

==== Mixed team ====
Year	Round	Pos
1978	Did not enter	
1982	Did not enter	
1986	Did not enter	
1990	Did not enter	
1994	Group stage	
2002	Did not enter	
2006	Did not enter	
2010	Did not enter	
2014	Did not enter	
2018	Did not enter	
2022	Did not enter	
2026	TBD	

=== Asian Games ===
==== Men's team ====
Year	Round	Pos
1962	Did not enter	
1966	Did not enter	
1970	Did not enter	
1974	Did not enter	
1978	Did not enter	
1982	Did not enter	
1986	Did not enter	
1990	Did not enter	
1994	Did not enter	
1998	Did not enter	
2002	Did not enter	
2006	Did not enter	
2010	Did not enter	
2014	Did not enter	
2018	Did not enter	
2022	Did not enter	
2026	TBD	
2030	TBD	
2034	TBD	
2038	TBD	

==== Women's team ====
Year	Round	Pos
1962	Did not enter	
1966	Did not enter	
1970	Did not enter	
1974	Did not enter	
1978	Did not enter	
1982	Did not enter	
1986	Did not enter	
1990	Did not enter	
1994	Did not enter	
1998	Did not enter	
2002	Did not enter	
2006	Did not enter	
2010	Did not enter	
2014	Did not enter	
2018	Did not enter	
2022	Did not enter	
2026	TBD	
2030	TBD	
2034	TBD	
2038	TBD	

=== Asian Team Championships ===
==== Men's team ====
Year	Round	Pos
1962	Did not enter	
1965	Did not enter	
1969	Did not enter	
1971	Did not enter	
1976	Did not enter	
1983	Did not enter	
1985	Round of 16	
1987	Did not enter	
1989	Did not enter	
1993	Did not enter	
2004	Did not enter	
2006	Did not enter	
2008	Did not enter	
2010	Did not enter	
2012	Did not enter	
2016	Did not enter	
2018	Did not enter	
2020	Did not enter	
2022	Did not enter	
2024	Group stage	14th
2026	TBD	
2028	TBD	
2030	TBD	

==== Women's team ====
Year	Round	Pos
2004	Did not enter	
2006	Did not enter	
2008	Did not enter	
2010	Did not enter	
2012	Did not enter	
2016	Did not enter	
2018	Did not enter	
2020	Did not enter	
2022	Did not enter	
2024	Did not enter	
2026	TBD	
2028	TBD	
2030	TBD	

==== Mixed team ====
Year	Round	Pos
2017	Did not enter	
2019	Did not enter	
2023	Did not enter	
2025	TBD	
2027	TBD	
2029	TBD	

=== SEA Games ===
==== Men's team ====
Year	Round	Pos
1965	Did not enter	
1971	Did not enter	
1973	Did not enter	
1975	Did not enter	
1977	Did not enter	
1979	Did not enter	
1981	Quarter-finals	
1983	Quarter-finals	
1985	Quarter-finals	
1987	Did not enter	
1989	Did not enter	
1991	Did not enter	
1993	Quarter-finals	6th
1995	Quarter-finals	
1997	Did not enter	
1999	Quarter-finals	
2001	Quarter-finals	
2003	Did not enter	
2005	Did not enter	
2007	Did not enter	
2009	Did not enter	
2011	Did not enter	
2015	Did not enter	
2017	Did not enter	
2019	Did not enter	
2021	Did not enter	
2023	Did not enter	
2025	Did not enter	
2027	TBD	
2029	TBD	
2031	TBD	
2033	TBD	

==== Women's team ====
Year	Round	Pos
1965	Did not enter	
1971	Did not enter	
1973	Did not enter	
1975	Did not enter	
1977	Did not enter	
1979	Did not enter	
1981	Did not enter	
1983	Did not enter	
1985	Quarter-finals	5th
1987	Did not enter	
1989	Did not enter	
1991	Did not enter	
1993	Did not enter	
1995	Did not enter	
1997	Did not enter	
1999	Did not enter	
2001	Did not enter	
2003	Did not enter	
2005	Did not enter	
2007	Did not enter	
2009	Did not enter	
2011	Did not enter	
2015	Did not enter	
2017	Did not enter	
2019	Did not enter	
2021	Did not enter	
2023	Did not enter	
2025	Did not enter	
2027	TBD	
2029	TBD	
2031	TBD	
2033	TBD	

==== Mixed team ====
Year	Round	Pos
2023	Semi-finals	4th

=== FISU World University Games ===
==== Mixed team ====
Year	Round	Pos
2007	Group stage	
2011	Did not enter	
2013	Did not enter	
2015	Did not enter	
2017	Did not enter	
2021	Did not enter	
2025	TBD	

=== World University Team Championships ===
==== Mixed team ====
Year	Round	Pos
2008	Did not enter	
2010	Did not enter	
2012	Did not enter	
2014	Did not enter	
2016	Did not enter	
2018	Did not enter	

=== ASEAN University Games ===
==== Men's team ====
Year	Round	Pos
2004	Did not enter	
2006	Did not enter	
2008	Did not enter	
2010	Did not enter	
2012	Did not enter	
2014	Group stage	
2016	Group stage	
2018	Did not enter	
2022	Did not enter	
2024	TBD	

==== Women's team ====
Year	Round	Pos
2004	Did not enter	
2006	Did not enter	
2008	Did not enter	
2010	Did not enter	
2012	Did not enter	
2014	Did not enter	
2016	Did not enter	
2018	Did not enter	
2022	Did not enter	
2024	TBD	

**Red border color indicates tournament was held on home soil.

== Junior competitive record ==
=== Suhandinata Cup ===
Year	Round	Pos
2000	Did not enter	
2002	Did not enter	
2004	Did not enter	
2006	Did not enter	
2007	Did not enter	
2008	Did not enter	
2009	Did not enter	
2010	Did not enter	
2011	Did not enter	
2012	Did not enter	
2013	Did not enter	
2014	Did not enter	
2015	Did not enter	
2016	Did not enter	
2017	Did not enter	
2018	Did not enter	
2019	Did not enter	
2022	Did not enter	
2023	Did not enter	
2024	TBD	

=== Asian Junior Team Championships ===
==== Boys' team ====
Year	Round	Pos
1997	Did not enter	
1998	Did not enter	
1999	Did not enter	
2000	Did not enter	
2001	Did not enter	
2002	Did not enter	
2004	Did not enter	
2005	Did not enter	

==== Girls' team ====
Year	Round	Pos
1997	Did not enter	
1998	Did not enter	
1999	Did not enter	
2000	Did not enter	
2001	Did not enter	
2002	Did not enter	
2004	Did not enter	
2005	Did not enter	

==== Mixed team ====
Year	Round	Pos
2006	Did not enter	
2007	Group stage	
2008	Did not enter	
2009	Did not enter	
2010	Did not enter	
2011	Did not enter	
2012	Did not enter	
2013	Did not enter	
2014	Did not enter	
2015	Did not enter	
2016	Did not enter	
2017	Did not enter	
2018	Did not enter	
2019	Did not enter	
2023	Did not enter	
2024	TBD	
2025	TBD	

=== ASEAN School Games ===
==== Boys' team ====
Year	Round	Pos
2009	Did not enter	
2010	Did not enter	
2011	Did not enter	
2012	Did not enter	
2013	Did not enter	
2014	Group stage	
2015	Group stage	
2016	Did not enter	
2017	Did not enter	
2018	Did not enter	
2019	Did not enter	

==== Girls' team ====
Year	Round	Pos
2009	Did not enter	
2010	Did not enter	
2011	Did not enter	
2012	Did not enter	
2013	Did not enter	
2014	Group stage	
2015	Group stage	
2016	Did not enter	
2017	Did not enter	
2018	Did not enter	
2019	Did not enter	

**Red border color indicates tournament was held on home soil.

== Staff ==
The following list shows the coaching staff for the Brunei national badminton team.

Name	Role
(Brunei) Mohd Zuno Kartono Ali	Coach
(Brunei) Imay Hendra	Doubles coach

== Players ==
=== Current squad ===
As of 2 January 2024

==== Men's team ====
Name	DoB/Age	Ranking of event		
Name	DoB/Age	MS	MD	XD
Kan Kah Kit	5 December 2000 (age 25)	451	991	-
Mattew Minggat	6 January 2000 (age 26)	1444	991	-
Marhanif Ali	6 August 2001 (age 24)	1322	-	-
Azri Safwan Jofri	29 April 1996 (age 30)	-	-	-

==== Women's team ====
Name	DoB/Age	Ranking of event		
Name	DoB/Age	WS	WD	XD
Samantha Lee Harn Rou	16 June 2002 (age 23)	-	-	-
Siti Marinah Salleh	26 February 1989 (age 37)	-	-	-
Nuraqilah Shahroney	26 April 1993 (age 33)	-	-	-

=== Previous squads ===
==== SEA Games ====
- Men's team: 1999, 2001
- Mixed team: 2023
