= Philippines national badminton team =

Philippines
- Nickname(s): Smash Pilipinas
- Association: Philippine Badminton Association (PBAD)
- Confederation: BA (Asia)
- President: Arnold Bacera

BWF ranking
- Current ranking: 69 ▼16 (2 January 2024)
- Highest ranking: 32 (1 July 2011)

Sudirman Cup
- Appearances: 4 (first in 2009)
- Best result: Group stage (2009, 2011, 2013, 2015)

Asian Mixed Team Championships
- Appearances: 1 (first in 2017)
- Best result: Group stage (2017)

Asian Men's Team Championships
- Appearances: 12 (first in 1962)
- Best result: Fourth place (1969)

Asian Women's Team Championships
- Appearances: 3 (first in 2010)
- Best result: Group stage (2018, 2020)

The Philippines national badminton team (Filipino: Pambansang koponan ng badminton ng Pilipinas) represents the Philippines in international badminton competitions. It is controlled by the Philippine Badminton Association. Nicknamed Smash Pilipinas, The Filipino team won bronze in the men's and women's team events at the Southeast Asian Games, in 1987 and 1981 respectively.

== History ==
Badminton has been played in the Philippines since the 1920s when British and American expatriates introduced the sport to the country. The national team was formed after the establishment of the Philippine Badminton Association in 1952. The Philippines made a couple of appearances at the Sudirman Cup in the 2010s.

In 2023, Indonesian coach Chafidz Yusuf was appointed as the doubles coach for the national team.

=== Men's team ===
The Philippines men's team first competed in the qualifiers for the 1984 Thomas Cup. The team were drawn with Hong Kong, Australia and Singapore and lost all of their matches in the group tie. Three years later, the Philippines competed in the 1987 Southeast Asian Games, where the team entered the semifinals for a guaranteed bronze medal but lost 3–0 to Malaysia. In 1992, the Philippines failed to qualify for the 1992 Thomas Cup after losing 4–1 to Pakistan, 5–0 to India and Singapore in the first stage of the qualifiers. In 1997, the Philippines lost the third place tie to Thailand at the Southeast Asian Games. In 1998, The Philippines tried to qualify for the 1998 Thomas Cup. The team shown improvement as they lost 4–1 to Singapore, 3–2 to Australia and won 5–0 against Iran.

The Philippines men's team made their Badminton Asia Team Championships debut in 2016. The team lost 5–0 to South Korea and 4–1 to Hong Kong and were eliminated in the group stages. They made their second appearance at the Asian Team Championships in 2018 and were eliminated in the group stages. The men's team made history when the team beat arch rival Singapore 3–2 to reach the quarterfinals in the 2020 edition of the championships. The team lost to Indonesia 3–0 in the quarter-finals.

=== Women's team ===
The Philippines women's team debuted at the 1981 Southeast Asian Games and entered the semifinals to claim bronze. Ten years later, the women's team entered their second semifinal at the 1991 Southeast Asian Games and finished in fourth place. In 1992, the Philippines competed in the 1992 Uber Cup qualifiers. The team lost 5–0 to New Zealand and Hong Kong but won 5–0 against Tanzania to finish 3rd in the group. In 1998, the Philippines women's team failed to qualify again for the Uber Cup. Much like the men's team, the women's team lost 4–1 to Singapore and 3–2 to Australia but won 4–1 against Mauritius.

The women's team debuted in the Badminton Asia Team Championships in 2018. They were eliminated in the group stages in 2018 and 2020. In 2023, the Philippines women's team competed in the 2023 Southeast Asian Games women's team event in Phnom Penh. In the quarter-finals, the team pulled off a big upset after defeating the Malaysian women's team 3–0 and entered the semi-finalists once again after 42 years. In the semi-finals, the team went up against Indonesia but lost 3–0 to win bronze.

=== Mixed team ===
The Philippines have made several appearances in the Sudirman Cup, their first one being in 2009. They achieved 23rd place in the 2013 Sudirman Cup. and later 29th place in the 2015 Sudirman Cup. The mixed team competed in the 2017 Badminton Asia Mixed Team Championships but were halted in the group stages.

== Competitive record ==
=== Thomas Cup ===
Year	Round	Pos
1949	Did not enter	
1952	Did not enter	
1955	Did not enter	
1958	Did not enter	
1961	Did not enter	
1964	Did not enter	
1967	Did not enter	
1970	Did not enter	
1973	Did not enter	
1976	Did not enter	
1979	Did not enter	
1982	Did not enter	
1984	Did not qualify	
1986	Did not enter	
1988	Did not enter	
1990	Did not enter	
1992	Did not qualify	
1994	Withdrew	
1996	Did not enter	
1998	Did not qualify	
2000	Did not enter	
2002	Did not enter	
2004	Did not enter	
2006	Did not enter	
2008	Did not qualify	
2010	Did not qualify	
2012	Did not enter	
2014	Did not enter	
2016	Did not qualify	
2018	Did not qualify	
2020	Did not qualify	
2022	Did not enter	
2024	Did not enter	
2026	TBD	
2028	TBD	
2030	TBD	

=== Uber Cup ===
Year	Round	Pos
1957	Did not enter	
1960	Did not enter	
1963	Did not enter	
1966	Did not enter	
1969	Did not enter	
1972	Did not enter	
1975	Did not enter	
1978	Did not enter	
1981	Did not enter	
1984	Did not enter	
1986	Did not enter	
1988	Did not enter	
1990	Did not enter	
1992	Did not qualify	
1994	Did not qualify	
1996	Did not enter	
1998	Did not qualify	
2000	Did not enter	
2002	Did not enter	
2004	Did not enter	
2006	Did not enter	
2008	Did not enter	
2010	Did not qualify	
2012	Did not enter	
2014	Did not enter	
2016	Did not enter	
2018	Did not qualify	
2020	Did not qualify	
2022	Did not enter	
2024	Did not enter	
2026	TBD	
2028	TBD	
2030	TBD	

=== Sudirman Cup ===
Year	Round	Pos
1989	Did not enter	
1991	Did not enter	
1993	Did not enter	
1995	Did not enter	
1997	Did not enter	
1999	Did not enter	
2001	Did not enter	
2003	Did not enter	
2005	Did not enter	
2007	Did not enter	
2009	Group stage	27th
2011	Group stage	30th
2013	Group stage	23rd
2015	Group stage	29th
2017	Did not enter	
2019	Did not enter	
2021	Did not enter	
2023	Did not enter	
2025	TBD	
2027	TBD	
2029	TBD	

=== WBF World Championships ===
==== Men's team ====
Year	Round	Pos
1979	Group stage	

==== Women's team ====
Year	Round	Pos
1979	Did not enter	

=== Asian Games ===
==== Men's team ====
Year	Round	Pos
1962	Quarter-finals	
1966	Quarter-finals	
1970	Quarter-finals	
1974	Quarter-finals	7th
1978	Did not enter	
1982	Did not enter	
1986	Did not enter	
1990	Did not enter	
1994	Did not enter	
1998	Did not enter	
2002	Did not enter	
2006	Did not enter	
2010	Did not enter	
2014	Did not enter	
2018	Did not enter	
2022	Did not enter	
2026	TBD	
2030	TBD	
2034	TBD	
2038	TBD	

==== Women's team ====
Year	Round	Pos
1962	Did not enter	
1966	Did not enter	
1970	Did not enter	
1974	Did not enter	
1978	Did not enter	
1982	Did not enter	
1986	Did not enter	
1990	Did not enter	
1994	Did not enter	
1998	Did not enter	
2002	Did not enter	
2006	Did not enter	
2010	Did not enter	
2014	Did not enter	
2018	Did not enter	
2022	Did not enter	
2026	TBD	
2030	TBD	
2034	TBD	
2038	TBD	

=== Asian Team Championships ===
==== Men's team ====
Year	Round	Pos
1962	Round of 32	
1965	Quarter-finals	
1969	Fourth place	4th
1971	Round of 16	
1976	Did not enter	
1983	Did not enter	
1985	Round of 16	
1987	Group stage	
1989	Did not enter	
1993	Group stage	
2004	Did not enter	
2006	Did not enter	
2008	Group stage	
2010	Group stage	
2012	Did not enter	
2016	Group stage	
2018	Group stage	
2020	Quarter-finals	
2022	Did not enter	
2024	Did not enter	
2026	TBD	
2028	TBD	
2030	TBD	

==== Women's team ====
Year	Round	Pos
2004	Did not enter	
2006	Did not enter	
2008	Did not enter	
2010	Group stage	
2012	Did not enter	
2016	Did not enter	
2018	Group stage	
2020	Group stage	
2022	Did not enter	
2024	Did not enter	
2026	TBD	
2028	TBD	
2030	TBD	

==== Mixed team ====
Year	Round	Pos
2017	Group stage	
2019	Did not enter	
2023	Did not enter	
2025	Withdrew	

=== SEA Games ===
==== Men's team ====
Year	Round	Pos
1965	Did not enter	
1971	Did not enter	
1973	Did not enter	
1975	Did not enter	
1977	Did not enter	
1979	Did not enter	
1981	Quarter-finals	5th
1983	Quarter-finals	5th
1985	Quarter-finals	7th
1987	Semi-finals	4th
1989	Quarter-finals	5th
1991	Quarter-finals	5th
1993	Quarter-finals	5th
1995	Quarter-finals	
1997	Fourth place	4th
1999	Quarter-finals	
2001	Did not enter	
2003	Quarter-finals	
2005	Quarter-finals	
2007	Did not enter	
2009	Did not enter	
2011	Quarter-finals	
2015	Did not enter	
2017	Did not enter	
2019	Quarter-finals	
2021	Quarter-finals	
2023	Quarter-finals	
2025	Quarter-finals	
2027	TBD	
2029	TBD	
2031	TBD	
2033	TBD	

==== Women's team ====
Year	Round	Pos
1965	Did not enter	
1971	Did not enter	
1973	Did not enter	
1975	Did not enter	
1977	Did not enter	
1979	Did not enter	
1981	Semi-finals	4th
1983	Quarter-finals	5th
1985	Did not enter	
1987	Did not enter	
1989	Quarter-finals	5th
1991	Semi-finals	4th
1993	Quarter-finals	5th
1995	Quarter-finals	
1997	Quarter-finals	
1999	Did not enter	
2001	Did not enter	
2003	Quarter-finals	
2005	Quarter-finals	
2007	Did not enter	
2009	Did not enter	
2011	Quarter-finals	
2015	Did not enter	
2017	Did not enter	
2019	Quarter-finals	
2021	Quarter-finals	
2023	Semi-finals	4th
2025	Quarter-finals	
2027	TBD	
2029	TBD	
2031	TBD	
2033	TBD	

==== Mixed team ====
Year	Round	Pos
2023	Ineligible (Note: In the 2023 SEA Games mixed team event, Indonesia, Malaysia, Thailand, Vietnam, Singapore and the Philippines were all restricted from entering the competition.)	

=== FISU World University Games ===
==== Mixed team ====
Year	Round	Pos
2007	Did not enter	
2011	Did not enter	
2013	Did not enter	
2015	Group stage	
2017	Group stage	
2021	Did not enter	
2025	TBD	

=== World University Team Championships ===
==== Mixed team ====
Year	Round	Pos
2008	Did not enter	
2010	Did not enter	
2012	Did not enter	
2014	Did not enter	
2016	Did not enter	
2018	Did not enter	

=== ASEAN University Games ===
==== Men's team ====
Year	Round	Pos
2004	Did not enter	
2006	Did not enter	
2008	Did not enter	
2010	Did not enter	
2012	Did not enter	
2014	Did not enter	
2016	Did not enter	
2018	Did not enter	
2022	Did not enter	
2024	TBD	

==== Women's team ====
Year	Round	Pos
2004	Did not enter	
2006	Did not enter	
2008	Did not enter	
2010	Did not enter	
2012	Did not enter	
2014	Did not enter	
2016	Did not enter	
2018	Did not enter	
2022	Did not enter	
2024	TBD	

**Red border color indicates tournament was held on home soil.

== Junior competitive record ==
=== Suhandinata Cup ===
Year	Round	Pos
2000	Did not enter	
2002	Did not enter	
2004	Did not enter	
2006	Group stage	25th
2007	Group stage	22nd
2008	Did not enter	
2009	Group stage	10th
2010	Did not enter	
2011	Did not enter	
2012	Group stage	13th
2013	Group stage	29th
2014	Group stage	15th
2015	Did not enter	
2016	Did not enter	
2017	Group stage	19th
2018	Did not enter	
2019	Did not enter	
2020	Cancelled because of COVID-19 pandemic	
2021	Cancelled because of COVID-19 pandemic	
2022	Did not enter	
2023	Did not enter	
2024	Group stage	25th
2025	Group stage	10th of 36
2026	Group stage	33rd of 47

=== Asian Junior Team Championships ===
==== Boys' team ====
Year	Round	Pos
1997	Quarter-finals	
1998	Round of 16	
1999	Round of 16	
2000	Did not enter	
2001	Round of 16	
2002	Round of 16	
2004	Did not enter	
2005	Did not enter	

==== Girls' team ====
Year	Round	Pos
1997	Round of 16	
1998	Round of 16	
1999	Round of 16	
2000	Did not enter	
2001	Round of 16	
2002	Quarter-finals	
2004	Did not enter	
2005	Did not enter	

==== Mixed team ====
Year	Round	Pos
2006	Round of 16	
2007	Group stage	
2008	Did not enter	
2009	Did not enter	
2010	Group stage	
2011	Did not enter	
2012	Did not enter	
2013	Did not enter	
2014	Group stage	
2015	Group stage	
2016	Group stage	
2017	Group stage	
2018	Did not enter	
2019	Did not enter	
2023	Group stage	
2024	Group stage	14th
2025	Group stage	10th
2026	Group stage	10th

=== ASEAN School Games ===
==== Boys' team ====
Year	Round	Pos
2009	Did not enter	
2010	Did not enter	
2011	Did not enter	
2012	Did not enter	
2013	Group stage	
2014	Group stage	
2015	Group stage	
2016	Did not enter	
2017	Group stage	
2018	Group stage	
2019	Semi-finals	4th

==== Girls' team ====
Year	Round	Pos
2009	Did not enter	
2010	Did not enter	
2011	Did not enter	
2012	Did not enter	
2013	Group stage	
2014	Group stage	
2015	Group stage	
2016	Did not enter	
2017	Semi-finals	4th
2018	Semi-finals	4th
2019	Semi-finals	4th

**Red border color indicates tournament was held on home soil.

== Coaches ==
The following list shows the coaching staff for the Philippines national badminton team.

=== Current coaches ===
- (Philippines) Philip Joper Escueta (2021–present)
- (Philippines) Bianca Carlos (2021–present)
- (Philippines) Paul Jefferson Vivas (2018–present)
- (Philippines) John Kenneth Monterubio (2021–present)
- (Philippines) Ronald Magnaye (2017–present)

=== Former coaches ===
- (Philippines) Adriano Torres Jr. (1977–1980)
- (Singapore) Ong Poh Lim (August–September 1980)
- (Philippines) Nelson Asuncion (1983–1998)
- (Philippines) Antonio Mance Jr. (1997–2002)
- (Philippines) Frederico Ferrer (1997–1999)
- (Philippines) Jesus Araneta Martin (1999–2003)
- (Philippines) Arolas Amahit Jr. (2012–2021)
- (Indonesia) Paulus Firman (2014–2018)
- (Malaysia) Rosman Razak (November 2021 – December 2022)
- (Indonesia) Chafidz Yusuf (February 2023 – May 2024)

== Players ==
=== Current squad ===
As of 2 January 2024

==== Men's team ====
Name	DoB/Age	Ranking of event		
Name	DoB/Age	MS	MD	XD
Jewel Albo	20 December 2003 (age 22)	301	-	-
Mark Velasco	20 May 2001 (age 25)	563	-	-
Alvin Morada	12 April 1997 (age 29)	-	74	115
Christian Bernardo	25 July 1998 (age 28)	-	74	494
Solomon Padiz Jr.	13 November 2000 (age 25)	-	140	131
Julius Villabrille	29 October 2000 (age 25)	-	140	-
Lanz Zafra	8 September 2001 (age 25)	-	-	-
Lance Vargas	11 September 2004 (age 22)	-	-	-

==== Women's team ====
Name	DoB/Age	Ranking of event		
Name	DoB/Age	WS	WD	XD
Nicole Albo	15 March 1999 (age 27)	-	493	-
Janelle Anne Andres	18 January 1999 (age 27)	-	-	-
Sarah Barredo	17 October 1999 (age 26)	-	-	-
Mikaela de Guzman	25 October 2001 (age 24)	212	-	-
Thea Pomar	25 January 1998 (age 28)	-	159	494
Alyssa Leonardo	15 September 1997 (age 29)	-	159	115
Eleanor Inlayo	9 January 1998 (age 28)	-	866	131
Susmita Ramos	27 November 2001 (age 24)	-	493	-

=== Previous squads ===
==== Asian Team Championships ====
- Women's team: 2020
