= Myanmar national badminton team =

National badminton team of Myanmar

Myanmar
- Association: Myanmar Badminton Federation (MBF)
- Confederation: BA (Asia)
- President: Aung Paing

BWF ranking
- Current ranking: 64 ▼2 (2 January 2024)
- Highest ranking: 57 (4 October 2018)

Asian Men's Team Championships
- Appearances: 3 (first in 1969)
- Best result: Quarter-finals (1969)

The Myanmar national badminton team (Burmese: မြန်မာ့လက်ရွေးစင် ကြက်တောင်ရိုက်အသင်း) represents Myanmar in international badminton team competitions. The best result for both men and women's team was a third place finish at the 1979 and 1995 Southeast Asian Games. The men's team was selected to take part in the 1976 Thomas Cup but failed to qualify into the first round.

== History ==
The Burmese national badminton team was formed in 1948 after the formation of Myanmar Badminton Federation. The team was sent to compete in the 1959 Southeast Asian Peninsular Games.

=== Men's team ===
Myanmar first competed in the 1966 Asian Games. The team lost 4–5 in the first round to Malaysia. Myanmar have faced difficulties in qualifying for the Thomas Cup, having failed to qualify for the 1958 Thomas Cup after losing to Pakistan with a score of 8–1 in the qualifying tie and conceding a walkover to Hong Kong in the 1976 Thomas Cup Asian zone qualification round. Myanmar finished third at the Southeast Asian Games in 1971 and 1981. The men's team finished in third place for a third time at the 1995 Southeast Asian Games. Myanmar later took part in qualifying 1998 Thomas & Uber Cup. The team were drawn into Group C and won against Pakistan and Macau but lost to Canada.

In 2018, the Burmese men's team made their debut at the Badminton Asia Team Championships, with a total of 6 players selected to represent the team. The team lost all their matches and were eliminated in the group stages.

=== Women's team ===
The Burmese women's team competed in the women's team event at the 1966 Asian Games and were eliminated in the quarter-final stage. The team enjoyed slight success in the late 70s, achieving third place at the 1979 WBF World Championships women's team event and winning third place in the 1979 Southeast Asian Games.

=== Mixed team ===
The Burmese mixed team first competed in the 2023 Southeast Asian Games mixed team event. They had a bye in the quarter-finals and defeated Brunei 3–0 in the semi-finals. In the final, the Burmese team finished as runners-up after the team lost 3–2 to the Cambodian host team.

== Competitive record ==
=== Thomas Cup ===
Year	Round	Pos
1949	Did not enter	
1952	Did not enter	
1955	Did not qualify	
1958	Did not qualify	
1961	Did not enter	
1964	Did not enter	
1967	Did not enter	
1970	Did not enter	
1973	Did not enter	
1976	Did not qualify	
1979	Did not enter	
1982	Did not enter	
1984	Did not enter	
1986	Did not enter	
1988	Did not enter	
1990	Did not qualify	
1992	Did not enter	
1994	Did not enter	
1996	Did not enter	
1998	Did not qualify	
2000	Did not enter	
2002	Did not enter	
2004	Did not enter	
2006	Did not enter	
2008	Did not enter	
2010	Did not enter	
2012	Did not enter	
2014	Did not enter	
2016	Did not enter	
2018	Did not qualify	
2020	Did not enter	
2022	Did not enter	
2024	TBD	
2026	TBD	
2028	TBD	
2030	TBD	

=== Uber Cup ===
Year	Round	Pos
1957	Did not enter	
1960	Did not enter	
1963	Did not enter	
1966	Did not enter	
1969	Did not enter	
1972	Did not enter	
1975	Did not enter	
1978	Did not enter	
1981	Did not enter	
1984	Did not enter	
1986	Did not enter	
1988	Did not enter	
1990	Did not enter	
1992	Did not enter	
1994	Did not enter	
1996	Did not enter	
1998	Did not enter	
2000	Did not enter	
2002	Did not enter	
2004	Did not enter	
2006	Did not enter	
2008	Did not enter	
2010	Did not enter	
2012	Did not enter	
2014	Did not enter	
2016	Did not enter	
2018	Did not enter	
2020	Did not enter	
2022	Did not enter	
2024	TBD	
2026	TBD	
2028	TBD	
2030	TBD	

=== Sudirman Cup ===
Year	Round	Pos
1989	Did not enter	
1991	Did not enter	
1993	Did not enter	
1995	Did not enter	
1997	Did not enter	
1999	Did not enter	
2001	Did not enter	
2003	Did not enter	
2005	Did not enter	
2007	Did not enter	
2009	Did not enter	
2011	Did not enter	
2013	Did not enter	
2015	Did not enter	
2017	Did not enter	
2019	Did not enter	
2021	Did not enter	
2023	Did not enter	
2025	TBD	
2027	TBD	
2029	TBD	

=== WBF World Championships ===
==== Men's team ====
Year	Round	Pos
1979	Group stage	8th

==== Women's team ====
Year	Round	Pos
1979	Third place	3rd

=== Asian Games ===
==== Men's team ====
Year	Round	Pos
1962	Did not enter	
1966	Round of 16	11th
1970	Did not enter	
1974	Did not enter	
1978	Did not enter	
1982	Did not enter	
1986	Did not enter	
1990	Did not enter	
1994	Did not enter	
1998	Did not enter	
2002	Did not enter	
2006	Did not enter	
2010	Did not enter	
2014	Did not enter	
2018	Did not enter	
2022	Did not enter	
2026	TBD	
2030	TBD	
2034	TBD	
2038	TBD	

==== Women's team ====
Year	Round	Pos
1962	Did not enter	
1966	Quarter-finals	6th
1970	Did not enter	
1974	Did not enter	
1978	Did not enter	
1982	Did not enter	
1986	Did not enter	
1990	Did not enter	
1994	Did not enter	
1998	Did not enter	
2002	Did not enter	
2006	Did not enter	
2010	Did not enter	
2014	Did not enter	
2018	Did not enter	
2022	Did not enter	
2026	TBD	
2030	TBD	
2034	TBD	
2038	TBD	

=== Asian Team Championships ===
==== Men's team ====
Year	Round	Pos
1962	Round of 16	10th
1965	Did not enter	
1969	Quarter-finals	7th
1971	Did not enter	
1976	Did not enter	
1983	Did not enter	
1985	Did not enter	
1987	Did not enter	
1989	Did not enter	
1993	Did not enter	
2004	Did not enter	
2006	Did not enter	
2008	Did not enter	
2010	Did not enter	
2012	Did not enter	
2016	Did not enter	
2018	Group stage	13th
2020	Did not enter	
2022	Did not enter	
2024	Group Stage	13th
2026	Group stage	11th
2028	TBD	
2028	TBD	
2030

==== Women's team ====
Year	Round	Pos
2004	Did not enter	
2006	Did not enter	
2008	Did not enter	
2010	Did not enter	
2012	Did not enter	
2016	Did not enter	
2018	Did not enter	
2020	Did not enter	
2022	Did not enter	
2024	Did not enter	
2026	Group stage	11th
2028	TBD	
2030	TBD	

==== Mixed team ====
Year	Round	Pos
2017	Did not enter	
2019	Did not enter	
2023	Did not enter	
2025	TBD	
2027	TBD	
2029	TBD	

=== SEA Games ===
==== Men's team ====
Year	Round	Pos
1965	Did not enter	
1971	Third place	3rd
1973	Did not enter	
1975	Fourth place	4th
1977	Did not enter	
1979	Quarter-finals	5th
1981	Third place	3rd
1983	Did not enter	
1985	Quarter-finals	5th
1987	Withdrew	
1989	Did not enter	
1991	Quarter-finals	6th
1993	Did not enter	
1995	Third place	3rd
1997	Quarter-finals	6th
1999	Did not enter	
2001	Quarter-finals	5th
2003	Did not enter	
2005	Did not enter	
2007	Did not enter	
2009	Did not enter	
2011	Round of 16	9th
2015	Did not enter	
2017	Quarter-finals	5th
2019	Quarter-finals	6th
2021	Did not enter	
2023	Did not enter	
2025	Quarter-finals	
2027	TBD	
2029	TBD	
2031	TBD	
2033	TBD	

==== Women's team ====
Year	Round	Pos
1965	Did not enter	
1971	Did not enter	
1973	Did not enter	
1975	Did not enter	
1977	Fourth place	4th
1979	Third place	3rd
1981	Did not enter	
1983	Did not enter	
1985	Did not enter	
1987	Withdrew	
1989	Did not enter	
1991	Did not enter	
1993	Did not enter	
1995	Quarter-finals	6th
1997	Did not enter	
1999	Did not enter	
2001	Did not enter	
2003	Did not enter	
2005	Did not enter	
2007	Did not enter	
2009	Did not enter	
2011	Quarter-finals	7th
2015	Did not enter	
2017	Quarter-finals	6th
2019	Did not enter	
2021	Did not enter	
2023	Did not enter	
2025	Quarter-finals	
2027	TBD	
2029	TBD	
2031	TBD	
2033	TBD	

==== Mixed team ====
Year	Round	Pos
2023	Runners-up	2nd

=== ASEAN University Games ===
==== Men's team ====
Year	Round	Pos
2004	Did not enter	
2006	Did not enter	
2008	Did not enter	
2010	Did not enter	
2012	Did not enter	
2014	Group stage	5th
2016	Did not enter	
2018	Group stage	5th
2022	Did not enter	
2024	TBD	

==== Women's team ====
Year	Round	Pos
2004	Did not enter	
2006	Did not enter	
2008	Did not enter	
2010	Did not enter	
2012	Did not enter	
2014	Fifth place	5th
2016	Did not enter	
2018	Group stage	5th
2022	Did not enter	
2024	TBD	

**Red border color indicates tournament was held on home soil.

== Junior competitive record ==
=== Suhandinata Cup ===
Year	Round	Pos
2000	Did not enter	
2002	Did not enter	
2004	Did not enter	
2006	Did not enter	
2007	Did not enter	
2008	Did not enter	
2009	Did not enter	
2010	Did not enter	
2011	Did not enter	
2012	Did not enter	
2013	Did not enter	
2014	Did not enter	
2015	Did not enter	
2016	Did not enter	
2017	Did not enter	
2018	Did not enter	
2019	Did not enter	
2022	Did not enter	
2023	Did not enter	
2024	TBD	

=== Asian Junior Team Championships ===
==== Boys' team ====
Year	Round	Pos
1997	Round of 16	11th
1998	Round of 16	
1999	Round of 16	10th
2000	Round of 16	10th
2001	Did not enter	
2002	Round of 16	10th
2004	Did not enter	
2005	Round of 16	10th

==== Girls' team ====
Year	Round	Pos
1997	Did not enter	
1998	Did not enter	
1999	Round of 16	10th
2000	Did not enter	
2001	Did not enter	
2002	Did not enter	
2004	Did not enter	
2005	Did not enter	

==== Mixed team ====
Year	Round	Pos
2006	Did not enter	
2007	Did not enter	
2008	Did not enter	
2009	Did not enter	
2010	Did not enter	
2011	Did not enter	
2012	Did not enter	
2013	Did not enter	
2014	Did not enter	
2015	Did not enter	
2016	Group stage	11th
2017	Group stage	14th
2018	Group stage	13th
2019	Did not enter	
2023	Did not enter	
2024	Did not enter	
2025	Group stage	14th
2026	Did not enter	

=== ASEAN School Games ===
==== Boys' team ====
Year	Result	Pos
2009	Did not enter	
2010	Did not enter	
2011	Did not enter	
2012	Did not enter	
2013	Did not enter	
2014	Did not enter	
2015	Did not enter	
2016	Did not enter	
2017	Did not enter	
2018	Group stage	6th
2019	Group stage	7th

==== Girls' team ====
Year	Result	Pos
2009	Did not enter	
2010	Did not enter	
2011	Did not enter	
2012	Did not enter	
2013	Did not enter	
2014	Did not enter	
2015	Did not enter	
2016	Did not enter	
2017	Did not enter	
2018	Group stage	7th
2019	Group stage	7th

**Red border color indicates tournament was held on home soil.

== Staff ==
The following list shows the coaching staff for the Myanmar national badminton team.

Name	Role
(Indonesia) Didit Suluh Patria	Coach

== Players ==
=== Current squad ===
As of 2 January 2024

==== Men's team ====
Name	DoB/Age	Ranking of event		
Name	DoB/Age	MS	MD	XD
Aung Myo Htoo	10 October 2001 (aged 24)	1	-	-
Arkar Phone Myat	26 December 1999 (aged 26)	2	-	-
Phone Pyae Naing	29 March 1998 (aged 28)	1	-	-
Chan Win Oo	15 May 1997 (aged 29)	-	-	-
Hein Si Thu Toe	5 November 1999 (aged 26)	-	-	-
Hein Htut	3 March 2006 (aged 20)	338	-	-
Zaw Lin Htoo	5 August 2004 (aged 21)	-	-	-
Hein Kaung san	25 February 2001 (aged 25)	1684	-	-

==== Women's team ====
Name	DoB/Age	Ranking of event		
Name	DoB/Age	WS	WD	XD
Thet Htar Thuzar	15 March 1999 (aged 27)	42	-	-
Zun Myo Thet	4 November 2003 (aged 22)	-	-	-
Khin Gone Yi Linn	24 December 1998 (aged 27)	-	-	-
Khaing Thin Zar	4 May 2000 (aged 26)	-	-	-
May Myat Noe Oo	4 May 2006 (aged 20)	-	-	-
Hnin Shwe Sin Oo	25 April 2003 (aged 23)	-	-	-
Kye Sin Thant	28 October 2002 (aged 23)	-	-	-
Thin Thin San	19 January 2001 (aged 25)	-	-	-

=== Previous squads ===
==== Asian Team Championships ====
- Men's team: 2018

==== Southeast Asian Games ====
- Mixed team: 2023
