= Singapore national badminton team =

National badminton team representing Singapore

Singapore
- Association: Singapore Badminton Association (SBA)
- Confederation: BA (Asia)
- President: Lawrence Leow

BWF ranking
- Current ranking: 17 (6 October 2026)
- Highest ranking: 9 (16 October 2014)

Sudirman Cup
- Appearances: 10 (first in 2001)
- Best result: Group stage (2001, 2005, 2007, 2009, 2011, 2013, 2015, 2017, 2019, 2023)

Thomas Cup
- Appearances: 3 (first in 1986)
- Best result: Group stage (1986, 2014, 2022)

Uber Cup
- Appearances: 2 (first in 2006)
- Best result: Quarter-finals (2006)

Asian Mixed Team Championships
- Appearances: 2 (first in 2017)
- Best result: Group stage (2017, 2019)

Asian Men's Team Championships
- Appearances: 6 (first in 2016)
- Best result: Semi-finals (2022)

Asian Women's Team Championships
- Appearances: 5 (first in 2016)
- Best result: Quarter-finals (2020)

The Singapore national badminton team (Note: Chinese: 新加坡国家羽毛球队; Malay: Pasukan Badminton Negara Singapura; Tamil: சிங்கப்பூர் தேசிய பூப்பந்து அணி) is a badminton team that represents Singapore in international badminton competitions. The national team is organised by the Singapore Badminton Association (SBA), the top governing body for badminton in the country.

== History ==
=== Thomas Cup ===
During the 1970 Thomas Cup qualification, Wee Choon Seng was Singapore team's captain. Singapore competes in the Australasian Zone, consisting of three teams. It received a bye in the semi-final but lost to New Zealand 2–7 in the finals and failed to qualify for the Thomas Cup.

For the 1973 Thomas Cup qualification, Singapore competes in the Asian Zone and lost to Thailand 2–7 in the first round and eliminated from qualification.

In August 1975, Singapore beat Sri Lanka 9–0 in the first round of qualification for 1976 Thomas Cup. The team then went on a training tour of China, playing 12 games in 16 days in three cities. Within a week, the team then played its Thomas Cup matches against Malaysia and lost 1–8 and eliminated from qualification.

=== SEA Games ===
During the 2025 SEA Games, Yeo Jia Min, top seed women's singles player, was the flagbearer of the Singapore's SEA Games contingent. The SBA targeted to win four medals but failed to achieve it. The men's and women's teams won bronze in their events while failed to gain any medals in the individuals and doubles event. Top seed Loh Kean Yew was eliminated in the quarter-finals and Jason Teh was knocked out in the first round. Yeo did not play in the Games as she was injured.

== Competitive record ==
=== Thomas Cup ===
Year	Round	Pos
1949	Did not enter	
1952	Did not enter	
1955	Did not enter	
1958	Did not enter	
1961	Did not enter	
1964	Did not enter	
1967	Did not enter	
1970	Did not qualify	
1973	Did not qualify	
1976	Did not qualify	
1979	Did not qualify	
1982	Did not qualify	
1984	Did not qualify	
1986	Group stage	8th
1988	Did not qualify	
1990	Did not qualify	
1992	Did not qualify	
1994	Did not qualify	
1996	Did not qualify	
1998	Did not qualify	
2000	Did not qualify	
2002	Did not qualify	
2004	Did not qualify	
2006	Did not qualify	
2008	Did not qualify	
2010	Did not qualify	
2012	Did not qualify	
2014	Group stage	10th
2016	Did not qualify	
2018	Did not qualify	
2020	Did not qualify	
2022	Group stage	13th
2024	Did not qualify	
2026	Did not qualify	
2028	TBD	
2030	TBD	

=== Uber Cup ===
Year	Round	Pos
1957	Did not enter	
1960	Did not enter	
1963	Did not enter	
1966	Did not enter	
1969	Did not enter	
1972	Did not enter	
1975	Did not enter	
1978	Did not enter	
1981	Did not enter	
1984	Did not enter	
1986	Did not enter	
1988	Did not enter	
1990	Did not qualify	
1992	Did not enter	
1994	Did not qualify	
1996	Did not qualify	
1998	Did not qualify	
2000	Did not qualify	
2002	Did not qualify	
2004	Did not enter	
2006	Quarter-finals	8th
2008	Did not qualify	
2010	Did not qualify	
2012	Did not qualify	
2014	Group stage	11th
2016	Did not qualify	
2018	Did not qualify	
2020	Did not qualify	
2022	Did not qualify	
2024	Group stage	14th
2026	Did not qualify	
2028	TBD	
2030	TBD	

=== Sudirman Cup ===
Year	Round	Pos
1989	Did not enter	
1991	Did not enter	
1993	Did not enter	
1995	Did not enter	
1997	Did not enter	
1999	Did not enter	
2001	Group stage	23rd
2003	Did not enter	
2005	Group stage	11th
2007	Group stage	10th
2009	Group stage	12th
2011	Group stage	13th
2013	Group stage	9th
2015	Group stage	16th
2017	Group stage	14th
2019	Group stage	17th
2021	Did not qualify	
2023	Group stage	10th
2025	Did not qualify	
2027	TBD	
2029	TBD	

=== Commonwealth Games ===
==== Men's team ====
Year	Round	Pos
1998	Did not enter	

==== Women's team ====
Year	Round	Pos
1998	Did not enter	

==== Mixed team ====
Year	Round	Pos
1978	Did not enter	
1982	Did not enter	
1986	Did not enter	
1990	Did not enter	
1994	Did not enter	
2002	Runners-up	2nd
2006	Quarter-finals	
2010	Fourth place	4th
2014	Third place	3rd
2018	Fourth place	4th
2022	Third place	3rd
2026	TBD	

=== GANEFO ===
==== Men's team ====
Year	Round	Pos
1963	Did not enter	
1966	Third place	3rd

==== Women's team ====
Year	Round	Pos
1963	Did not enter	
1966	Third place	3rd

=== Asian Games ===
==== Men's team ====
Year	Round	Pos
1962	Fourth place	4th
1966	Did not enter	
1970	Did not enter	
1974	Did not enter	
1978	Did not enter	
1982	Did not enter	
1986	Did not enter	
1990	Did not enter	
1994	Did not enter	
1998	Did not enter	
2002	Did not enter	
2006	Did not enter	
2010	Did not enter	
2014	Did not enter	
2018	Did not enter	
2022	Round of 16	
2026	TBD	
2030	TBD	
2034	TBD	
2038	TBD	

==== Women's team ====
Year	Round	Pos
1962	Did not enter	
1966	Did not enter	
1970	Did not enter	
1974	Did not enter	
1978	Did not enter	
1982	Did not enter	
1986	Did not enter	
1990	Did not enter	
1994	Did not enter	
1998	Did not enter	
2002	Did not enter	
2006	Semi-finals	4th
2010	Did not enter	
2014	Did not enter	
2018	Did not enter	
2022	Did not enter	
2026	TBD	
2030	TBD	
2034	TBD	
2038	TBD	

=== Asian Team Championships ===
==== Men's team ====
Year	Round	Pos
1962	Did not enter	
1965	Did not enter	
1969	Did not enter	
1971	Quarter-finals	
1976	Quarter-finals	
1983	Did not enter	
1985	Quarter-finals	
1987	Group stage	
1989	Group stage	
1993	Group stage	10th
2004	Group stage	8th
2006	Group stage	10th
2008	Quarter-finals	
2010	Group stage	
2012	Group stage	
2016	Group stage	
2018	Group stage	
2020	Group stage	
2022	Semi-finals	4th
2024	Quarter-finals	7th
2026	Group stage	10th
2028	TBD	
2030	TBD	

==== Women's team ====
Year	Round	Pos
2004	Did not enter	
2006	Third place	3rd
2008	Quarter-finals	5th
2010	Group stage	
2012	Quarter-finals	6th
2016	Group stage	
2018	Group stage	
2020	Quarter-finals	
2022	Withdrew	
2024	Group stage	9th
2026	Group stage	10th
2028	TBD	
2030	TBD	

==== Mixed team ====
Year	Round	Pos
2017	Group stage	
2019	Quarter-finals	
2023	Group stage	11th
2025	Group stage	10th

=== Asia Cup ===
==== Men's team ====
Year	Round	Pos
1997	Did not enter	
1999	Did not enter	
2001	Group stage	

=== SEA Games ===
==== Men's team ====
Year	Round	Pos
1965	Third place	3rd
1971	Fourth place	4th
1973	Third place	3rd
1975	Third place	3rd
1977	Fourth place	4th
1979	Did not enter	
1981	Did not enter	
1983	Semi-finals	4th
1985	Semi-finals	4th
1987	Withdrew	
1989	Semi-finals	4th
1991	Semi-finals	4th
1993	Semi-finals	4th
1995	Quarter-finals	5th
1997	Quarter-finals	5th
1999	Semi-finals	4th
2001	Semi-finals	4th
2003	Semi-finals	3rd
2005	Quarter-finals	5th
2007	Runners-up	2nd
2009	Semi-finals	4th
2011	Semi-finals	4th
2015	Semi-finals	4th
2017	Semi-finals	4th
2019	Semi-finals	4th
2021	Semi-finals	4th
2023	Semi-finals	4th
2025	Semi-finals	3rd
2027	TBD	
2029	TBD	
2031	TBD	
2033	TBD	

==== Women's team ====
Year	Round	Pos
1965	Third place	3rd
1971	Third place	3rd
1973	Third place	3rd
1975	Third place	3rd
1977	Fourth place	4th
1979	Did not enter	
1981	Did not enter	
1983	Semi-finals	4th
1985	Semi-finals	4th
1987	Did not enter	
1989	Semi-finals	4th
1991	Did not enter	
1993	Semi-finals	4th
1995	Semi-finals	4th
1997	Fourth place	4th
1999	Did not enter	
2001	Did not enter	
2003	Champions	1st
2005	Runners-up	2nd
2007	Runners-up	2nd
2009	Semi-finals	3rd
2011	Semi-finals	4th
2015	Semi-finals	4th
2017	Semi-finals	4th
2019	Semi-finals	3rd
2021	Semi-finals	4th
2023	Semi-finals	3rd
2025	Semi-finals	3rd
2027	TBD	
2029	TBD	
2031	TBD	
2033	TBD	

==== Mixed team ====
Year	Round	Pos
2023	Ineligible (Note: In the 2023 SEA Games mixed team event, Indonesia, Malaysia, Thailand, Vietnam, Singapore and the Philippines were all restricted from entering the competition.)	

=== FISU World University Games ===
==== Mixed team ====
Year	Round	Pos
2007	Did not enter	
2011	Did not enter	
2013	Did not enter	
2015	Did not enter	
2017	Group stage	21st
2021	Group stage	
2025	TBD	

=== World University Team Championships ===
==== Mixed team ====
Year	Round	Pos
2008	Did not enter	
2010	Group stage	11th
2012	Did not enter	
2014	Did not enter	
2016	Did not enter	
2018	Group stage	9th

=== ASEAN University Games ===
==== Men's team ====
Year	Round	Pos
2004	Fourth place	4th
2006	Fourth place	4th
2008	Third place	3rd
2010	Fourth place	4th
2012	Semi-finals	4th
2014	Semi-finals	4th
2016	Fourth place	4th
2018	Fourth place	4th
2022	Fourth place	4th
2024	TBD	

==== Women's team ====
Year	Round	Pos
2004	Fourth place	4th
2006	Fourth place	4th
2008	Third place	3rd
2010	Fourth place	4th
2012	Quarter-finals	5th
2014	Fourth place	4th
2016	Fourth place	4th
2018	Fourth place	4th
2022	Fourth place	4th
2024	TBD	

== Junior competitive record ==
=== Suhandinata Cup ===
Year	Round	Pos
(China) 2000	Group stage	9th of 24
(South Africa) 2002	Did not enter	
(Canada) 2004	Group stage	15th of 20
(South Korea) 2006	Group stage	6th of 28
(New Zealand) 2007	Third place	3rd of 25
(India) 2008	Group stage	11th of 21
(Malaysia) 2009	Group stage	12th of 21
(Mexico) 2010	Group stage	15th of 24
(Taiwan) 2011	Group stage	13th of 22
(Japan) 2012	Group stage	11th of 30
(Thailand) 2013	Group stage	10th of 30
(Malaysia) 2014	Group stage	10th of 33
(Peru) 2015	Group stage	11th of 39
(Spain) 2016	Group stage	10th of 52
(Indonesia) 2017	Group stage	12th of 44
(Canada) 2018	Group stage	10th of 39
(Russia) 2019	Group stage	13th of 43
(New Zealand) 2020	Cancelled because of COVID-19 pandemic	
(China) 2021	Cancelled because of COVID-19 pandemic	
(Spain) 2022	Group stage	18th of 37
(United States) 2023	Group stage	15th of 38
(China) 2024	Group stage	21st of 39
(India) 2025	Group stage	22nd of 36
(Egypt) 2026	Group stage	27th of 47

=== Commonwealth Youth Games ===
==== Mixed team ====
Year	Round	Pos
2004	Fourth place	4th

=== Asian Junior Team Championships ===
==== Boys' team ====
Year	Round	Pos
1997	Round of 16	
1998	Round of 16	
1999	Round of 16	
2000	Round of 16	
2001	Quarter-finals	
2002	Quarter-finals	
2004	Quarter-finals	
2005	Quarter-finals	

==== Girls' team ====
Year	Round	Pos
1997	Round of 16	
1998	Round of 16	
1999	Round of 16	
2000	Quarter-finals	
2001	Quarter-finals	
2002	Quarter-finals	
2004	Round of 16	
2005	Round of 16	

==== Mixed team ====
Year	Round	Pos
2006	Quarter-finals	
2007	Quarter-finals	
2008	Group stage	
2009	Group stage	
2010	Group stage	
2011	Group stage	
2012	Group stage	
2013	Group stage	
2014	Group stage	
2015	Group stage	
2016	Group stage	
2017	Quarter-finals	
2018	Group stage	
2019	Quarter-finals	
2023	Group stage	
2024	Group stage	11th
2025	Group stage	12th
2026	Group stage	12th

=== ASEAN School Games ===
==== Boys' team ====
Year	Round	Pos
2009	Third place	3rd
2010	Fourth place	4th
2011	Fourth place	4th
2012	Fourth place	4th
2013	Fourth place	4th
2014	Group stage	5th
2015	Semi-finals	4th
2016	Semi-finals	4th
2017	Group stage	5th
2018	Semi-finals	3rd
2019	Group stage	5th

==== Girls' team ====
Year	Round	Pos
2009	Third place	3rd
2010	Fourth place	4th
2011	Fourth place	4th
2012	Fourth place	4th
2013	Fourth place	4th
2014	Semi-finals	4th
2015	Semi-finals	4th
2016	Third place	3rd
2017	Group stage	5th
2018	Group stage	5th
2019	Group stage	5th

== Players ==
=== Current squad ===
As of 11 February 2026

==== Men's team ====
Name	DoB/Age	Ranking of event		
Name	DoB/Age	MS	MD	XD
Loh Kean Yew	26 June 1997 (age 29)	14	-	-
Jason Teh	25 August 2000 (age 26)	29	-	-
Joel Koh	23 November 2000 (age 25)	153	-	-
Marcus Phil Lau	28 January 2005 (age 21)	213	-	-
Eng Keat Wesley Koh	13 July 2002 (age 24)	-	48	-
Junsuke Kubo	11 May 2002 (age 24)	-	48	-
Jia Hao Howin Wong	17 April 2001 (age 25)	-	78	-
Donovan Willard Wee	15 January 2003 (age 23)	-	78	-
Kriston Jun Hao Choo	18 September 2002 (age 24)	-	273	164
Nge Joo Jin	19 April 2006 (age 20)	-	273	534
Nge Joo Jie	26 March 2002 (age 24)	-	710	-
Johann Prajogo	26 July 2004 (age 22)	-	-	-
Terry Hee	16 July 1995 (age 31)	-	928	36

==== Women's team ====
Name	DoB/Age	Ranking of event		
Name	DoB/Age	WS	WD	XD
Yeo Jia Min	1 February 1999 (age 27)	28	-	-
Megan Lee Xin Yi	27 May 2005 (age 21)	148	372	-
Nur Insyirah Khan	12 September 2001 (age 25)	150	372	-
Jaslyn Hooi	5 October 2000 (age 26)	172	-	-
Jin Yujia	6 February 1997 (age 29)	-	131	36
Heng Xiao En	9 June 2006 (age 20)	-	131	164
Elsa Lai Yi Ting	24 February 2005 (age 21)	-	-	-
