= Triady Fauzi Sidiq =

Indonesian swimmer

Personal information
- Full name: Triady Fauzi Sidiq
- National team: Indonesia
- Born: 29 September 1991 (age 34) Cimahi, Indonesia

Sport
- Sport: Swimming
- Strokes: Freestyle, Butterfly, Medley
Medal record
Men's swimming
Representing Indonesia
Asian Indoor and Martial Arts Games
Silver medal – second place	2013 Incheon	50 m freestyle
Islamic Solidarity Games
Gold medal – first place	2013 Palembang	50 m butterfly
Gold medal – first place	2013 Palembang	100 m butterfly
Gold medal – first place	2013 Palembang	200 m butterfly
Silver medal – second place	2013 Palembang	4x100 m medley
Silver medal – second place	2017 Baku	200 m medley
Silver medal – second place	2017 Baku	4x100 m freestyle
Silver medal – second place	2017 Baku	4x200 m freestyle
Silver medal – second place	2017 Baku	4x100 m medley
Bronze medal – third place	2013 Palembang	4x100 m freestyle
Bronze medal – third place	2017 Baku	50 m freestyle
Bronze medal – third place	2017 Baku	100 m butterfly
SEA Games
Gold medal – first place	2009 Vientiane	4x100 m medley
Gold medal – first place	2011 Jakarta–Palembang	4x100 m medley
Gold medal – first place	2013 Naypyidaw	50 m freestyle
Gold medal – first place	2013 Naypyidaw	100 m freestyle
Gold medal – first place	2017 Kuala Lumpur	200 m medley
Silver medal – second place	2011 Jakarta–Palembang	50 m freestyle
Silver medal – second place	2011 Jakarta–Palembang	4x100 m freestyle
Silver medal – second place	2013 Naypyidaw	100 m butterfly
Silver medal – second place	2015 Singapore	4×100 m medley
Silver medal – second place	2017 Kuala Lumpur	50 m freestyle
Silver medal – second place	2017 Kuala Lumpur	50 m butterfly
Silver medal – second place	2017 Kuala Lumpur	100 m butterfly
Silver medal – second place	2017 Kuala Lumpur	4×100 m medley
Silver medal – second place	2019 Philippines	4×100 m medley
Bronze medal – third place	2009 Vientiane	4x100 m freestyle
Bronze medal – third place	2011 Jakarta–Palembang	100 m freestyle
Bronze medal – third place	2013 Naypyidaw	4×200 m freestyle
Bronze medal – third place	2015 Singapore	50 m freestyle
Bronze medal – third place	2015 Singapore	100 m butterfly
Bronze medal – third place	2015 Singapore	4×100 m freestyle
Bronze medal – third place	2015 Singapore	4×200 m freestyle
Bronze medal – third place	2017 Kuala Lumpur	4×100 m freestyle
Bronze medal – third place	2019 Philippines	200 m medley
Southeast Asian Championships
Gold medal – first place	2012 Singapore	50 m freestyle
Gold medal – first place	2012 Singapore	4x100 m freestyle
Gold medal – first place	2012 Singapore	4x100 m medley
Gold medal – first place	2014 Singapore	200 m medley
Gold medal – first place	2014 Singapore	4x100 m medley
Silver medal – second place	2012 Singapore	200 m butterfly
Silver medal – second place	2014 Singapore	50 m freestyle
Silver medal – second place	2014 Singapore	50 m butterfly
Silver medal – second place	2014 Singapore	100 m butterfly
Silver medal – second place	2014 Singapore	4x100 m freestyle
Bronze medal – third place	2012 Singapore	100 m freestyle
Bronze medal – third place	2012 Singapore	100 m butterfly
Bronze medal – third place	2012 Singapore	4x200 m freestyle
ASEAN University Games
Gold medal – first place	2012 Vientiane	50 m freestyle
Gold medal – first place	2012 Vientiane	100 m freestyle
Gold medal – first place	2012 Vientiane	100 m butterfly
Gold medal – first place	2012 Vientiane	200 m butterfly
Gold medal – first place	2012 Vientiane	4x200 m freestyle
Gold medal – first place	2012 Vientiane	4x100 m medley
Gold medal – first place	2014 Palembang	50 m freestyle
Gold medal – first place	2014 Palembang	50 m butterfly
Gold medal – first place	2014 Palembang	100 m freestyle
Gold medal – first place	2014 Palembang	100 m butterfly
Gold medal – first place	2014 Palembang	200 m butterfly
Gold medal – first place	2014 Palembang	200 m medley
Gold medal – first place	2014 Palembang	4x100 m freestyle
Gold medal – first place	2014 Palembang	4x100 m medley
Gold medal – first place	2016 Singapore	50 m freestyle
Gold medal – first place	2016 Singapore	50 m butterfly
Gold medal – first place	2016 Singapore	100 m freestyle
Gold medal – first place	2016 Singapore	100 m butterfly
Gold medal – first place	2016 Singapore	4x100 m freestyle
Gold medal – first place	2016 Singapore	4x100 m medley
Silver medal – second place	2016 Singapore	4x200 m freestyle
SEA Age Groups Championships
Gold medal – first place	2009 Kuala Lumpur	100 m freestyle
Gold medal – first place	2009 Kuala Lumpur	100 m butterfly
Silver medal – second place	2009 Kuala Lumpur	50 m freestyle

Triady Fauzi Sidiq is an Indonesian swimmer who won a gold medal at the 2013 SEA Games and a bronze medal at the 2015 SEA Games in 50 metres freestyle. He currently holds Indonesian records in swimming in 50m, 100m and 200m freestyle; 200m butterfly; 200m individual medley; 4 × 100m freestyle relay; 4 × 200m freestyle relay; and 4 × 100m medley relay.
