= List of multi-sport events held by Thailand =

This article lists multi-sport events held by Thailand.

== Bangkok ==
Host city	Year	Event	Start date	End date	Officially opened by	Top placed team
Bangkok	1959	Southeast Asian Peninsular Games	December 12	December 17	King Bhumibol Adulyadej	Thailand
Bangkok	1966	Asian Games	December 9	December 20	King Bhumibol Adulyadej	Japan
Bangkok	1967	Southeast Asian Peninsular Games	December 9	December 16	King Bhumibol Adulyadej	Thailand
Bangkok	1970	Asian Games	December 9	December 20	King Bhumibol Adulyadej	Japan
Bangkok	1975	Southeast Asian Peninsular Games	December 9	December 16	King Bhumibol Adulyadej	Thailand
Bangkok	1978	Asian Games	December 9	December 20	King Bhumibol Adulyadej	Japan
Bangkok	1985	Southeast Asian Games	December 8	December 17	King Bhumibol Adulyadej	Thailand
Bangkok	1998	Asian Games	December 6	December 20	King Bhumibol Adulyadej	China
Bangkok	1999	FESPIC Games	January 10	January 16	Crown Prince Maha Vajiralongkorn	China
Bangkok	1999	ASEAN University Games	June 30	July 8	King Bhumibol Adulyadej	Thailand
Bangkok	2005	Asian Indoor Games	November 12	November 19	Crown Prince Maha Vajiralongkorn	China
Bangkok	2007	Summer Universiade	August 8	August 18	Crown Prince Maha Vajiralongkorn	China
Bangkok	2009	Asian Martial Arts Games	August 1	August 9	Crown Prince Maha Vajiralongkorn	Thailand

== Chiang Mai ==
Host city	Year	Event	Start date	End date	Officially opened by	Top placed team
Chiang Mai	1980	ASEAN University Games	July 20	July 29	Crown Prince Maha Vajiralongkorn	Thailand
Chiang Mai	1995	Southeast Asian Games	December 9	December 17	Crown Prince Maha Vajiralongkorn	Thailand
Chiang Mai	2010	ASEAN University Games	December 15	December 23	Minister Somchai Wongsawat	Thailand
Chiang Mai	2016	ASEAN School Games	July 22	July 29	Deputy Prime Minister Thanasak Patimaprakorn	Thailand

== Chonburi ==
Host city	Year	Event	Start date	End date	Officially opened by	Top placed team
Pattaya	1988	ASEAN University Games	June 22	June 30	Unknown	Thailand

== Nakhon Ratchasima ==
Host city	Year	Event	Start date	End date	Officially opened by	Top placed team
Nakhon Ratchasima	2007	Southeast Asian Games (Note: Bangkok and Chonburi were the co-host cities.)	December 6	December 15	Crown Prince Maha Vajiralongkorn	Thailand
Nakhon Ratchasima	2008	ASEAN Para Games	January 20	January 26	Prime Minister Surayud Chulanont	Thailand

== Phuket ==
Host city	Year	Event	Start date	End date	Officially opened by	Top placed team
Phuket	2014	Asian Beach Games	November 14	November 23	Privy Councillor Surayud Chulanont	Thailand

== Suphan Buri ==
Host city	Year	Event	Start date	End date	Officially opened by	Top placed team
Suphan Buri	2009	ASEAN School Games	July 20	July 29	Crown Prince Maha Vajiralongkorn	Thailand
