= Gagarin Nathaniel =

Indonesian swimmer (born 1995)

Gagarin Nathaniel Yus
Personal information
- Nationality: Indonesia
- Born: 28 December 1995 (age 30) Jakarta, Indonesia

Sport
- Sport: Swimming
Medal record
Men's swimming
Representing Indonesia
Event	1st	2nd	3rd
Islamic Solidarity Games	1	1	0
SEA Games	1	3	2
ASEAN University Games	5	5	1
Islamic Solidarity Games
Gold medal – first place	2017 Baku	200 m breaststroke
Silver medal – second place	2017 Baku	4x100 m medley
SEA Games
Gold medal – first place	2017 Kuala Lumpur	100 m breaststroke
Silver medal – second place	2017 Kuala Lumpur	4x100 m medley
Silver medal – second place	2019 Philippines	4x100 m medley
Silver medal – second place	2021 Vietnam	50 m breaststroke
Bronze medal – third place	2019 Philippines	50 m breaststroke
Bronze medal – third place	2021 Vietnam	100 m breaststroke
ASEAN University Games
Gold medal – first place	2016 Singapore	100 m breaststroke
Gold medal – first place	2016 Singapore	4x100 m freestyle
Gold medal – first place	2016 Singapore	4x100 m medley
Gold medal – first place	2018 Naypyidaw	100 m breaststroke
Gold medal – first place	2018 Naypyidaw	4x100 m medley
Silver medal – second place	2016 Singapore	50 m breaststroke
Silver medal – second place	2016 Singapore	4x200 m freestyle
Silver medal – second place	2018 Naypyidaw	50 m freestyle
Silver medal – second place	2018 Naypyidaw	4x100 m freestyle
Silver medal – second place	2018 Naypyidaw	4x200 m freestyle
Bronze medal – third place	2016 Singapore	200 m breaststroke

Gagarin Nathaniel (born December 28, 1995) is an Indonesian competitive swimmer. He is currently first rank, holding two all-time records for 100 M & 200 M Men's Breaststroke in Indonesia (2017–present). He is best known for his highest career achievement at SEA Games 2017, breaking the national record for 100 M Men's Breaststroke last made in 2009 by Indra Gunawan, and won Indonesia's first gold medal for that event since 1993 by Wirmandi Sugriat.

National Records
No	Distance	Event	Time	Location	Year	Ref
1	200 M	Breaststroke	2:16:61	Jakabaring Aquatic Stadium, Palembang	2017	
2	100 M	Breaststroke	1:01:76	National Aquatic Centre, Kuala Lumpur	2017	

== Swimming career ==
Gagarin first broke the national record at the Jakabaring Aquatic Stadium in Palembang. He broke the record in the 200 M Men's Breaststroke with a time of 2:15:35. He broke the old record of 2:16:61. In the 2017 Islamic Solidarity Games (ISG) event, Gagarin also won a gold medal which took place at the Baku Aquatics Center in Azerbaijan. In the event, he managed to record the fastest time of 2 minutes 17.23 seconds.

In SEA Games 2017 held in National Aquatic Centre, Kuala Lumpur, Gagarin won his gold medal from 100m breaststroke, with a recorded a time of 1:01:76. While the second position was occupied by the Filipino swimmer, James Deiparine with a time of 1:02:11. While the third position was won by a Thai swimmer, Radomyos Matjiur with a time of 1:02:24. This also marked his second national record, which was last made in 2009 by Indra Gunawan, and marked Indonesia's first gold medal for that event since 1993 by Wirmandi Sugriat.

His latest big achievement was PON Papua XX held in Lukas Enembe Stadium, Jayapura, where he won four gold medals and broke four game records. Gagarin won gold for 50m, 100m and 200m breaststroke along with 4 × 100 m men's medley.

For 50m breaststroke, in the preliminary round of the morning session Gagarin also recorded a PON record of 28.50 seconds, previously held by Indra Gunawan 28.60 seconds in 2016 PON. In the final session, Gagarin sharpened it to 28.34 seconds. For 100 M Breaststroke, Gagarin won another gold medal with a record of 01:02:49, which also became a PON record, previously belonging to Indra Gunawan 01:02:57 at PON 2012. Lastly, for 200m breaststroke, Gagarin won gold medal with a recorded time of 2:17:82, breaking another game record by Indra Gunawan made in 2012 PON in Riau, which had lasted since the 2012 PON, 2:17:98.

Currently, Gagarin is placed first rank in Indonesia's men's breaststroke event, holding his all time national records.
