= Swimming at the 2013 SEA Games – Men's 50 metre freestyle =

Swimming – Men's 50 metre freestyle at the 2013 SEA Games
- Venue: Wunna Theikdi Aquatics Centre
- Date: 15 December 2013
- Competitors: 15 from 8 nations
- Winning time: 23.12

Medalists
gold medal	Triady Fauzi Sidiq	Indonesia
silver medal	Russell Ong	Singapore
bronze medal	Gavin Alexander Lewis	Thailand

The Men's 50 metre freestyle event at the 2013 SEA Games took place on 15 December 2013 at Wunna Theikdi Aquatics Centre.

There were 15 competitors from 8 countries who took part in this event. Two heats were held. The heat in which a swimmer competed did not formally matter for advancement, as the swimmers with the top eight times from both field qualified for the finals.

== Schedule ==
All times are Myanmar Standard Time (UTC+06:30)

Date	Time	Event
Sunday, 15 December 2013	09:00	Heats
Sunday, 15 December 2013	18:00	Final

== Records ==
Prior to this competition, the existing world, Asian, and Southeast Asian Games records were as follows.

World Record	César Cielo (BRA)	20.91	São Paulo, Brazil	18 December 2009
Asian Record	Ning Zetao (CHN)	21.91	Shenyang, China	9 September 2013
Games Record	Daniel Eugenio Coakley (PHI)	22.62	Vientiane, Laos	13 December 2009

== Results ==
=== Heats ===
Rank	Heat	Lane	Athlete	Time	Notes
1	1	4	Triady Fauzi Sidiq (INA)	23.18	Q
2	2	4	Fang Yue Darren Lim (SIN)	23.24	Q
3	1	6	Gavin Alexander Lewis (THA)	23.40	Q
3	1	5	Russell Ong (SIN)	23.40	Q
5	2	5	Hoang Quy Phuoc (VIE)	24.05	Q
6	1	3	Papungkorn Ingkanont (THA)	24.07	Q
7	2	6	Guntur Pratama Putera (INA)	24.24	Q
8	2	3	Lim Ching Hwang (MAS)	24.42	Q
9	1	2	Ye Myint Hein (MYA)	24.52	
10	2	7	Win Htet Oo (MYA)	24.53	
11	2	2	Tran Duy Khoi (VIE)	25.16	
12	1	7	Chamraen Youri Maximov (CAM)	26.12	
13	2	8	Sergey Sihanouvong (LAO)	27.14	
14	1	1	Soulasen Phommasen (LAO)	27.59	
15	2	1	Hem Thonponloeu (CAM)	27.90	

=== Final ===
Rank	Lane	Athlete	Time	Notes
1st place, gold medalist(s)	4	Triady Fauzi Sidiq (INA)	23.12	
2nd place, silver medalist(s)	6	Kaiyi Russell Ong (SIN)	23.14	
3rd place, bronze medalist(s)	3	Gavin Alexander Lewis (THA)	23.41	
4	8	Lim Ching Hwang (MAS)	23.54	
5	5	Fang Yue Darren Lim (SIN)	23.58	
6	7	Papungkorn Ingkanont (THA)	23.80	
7	1	Guntur Pratama Putera (INA)	24.36	
8	2	Hoang Quy Phuoc (VIE)	25.08	
