= Swimming at the 2013 SEA Games – Men's 100 metre freestyle =

The Men's 100 metre freestyle event at the 2013 SEA Games took place on 13 December 2013 at Wunna Theikdi Aquatics Centre.

There were 17 competitors from 9 countries who took part in this event. Three heats were held. The heat in which a swimmer competed did not formally matter for advancement, as the swimmers with the top eight times from both field qualified for the finals.

== Schedule ==
All times are Myanmar Standard Time (UTC+06:30)

Date	Time	Event
Thursday, 13 December 2013	09:00	Heats
Thursday, 13 December 2013	18:07	Final

== Records ==
Prior to this competition, the existing world, Asian, and Southeast Asian Games records were as follows.

World Record	César Cielo (BRA)	46.91	Rome, Italy	30 July 2009
Asian Record	Ning Zetao (CHN)	48.27	Shenyang, China	8 September 2013
Games Record	Daniel Bego (MAS)	50.16	Vientiane, Laos	11 December 2009

== Results ==
=== Heats ===
Rank	Heat	Lane	Athlete	Time	Notes
1	2	5	Triady Fauzi Sidiq (INA)	51.21	Q
2	1	4	Danny Yeo (SIN)	51.54	Q
3	3	5	Hoang Quy Phuoc (VIE)	51.56	Q
4	1	3	Cholawat Phoduang (THA)	52.01	Q
5	3	4	Lim Ching Hwang (MAS)	52.02	Q
6	1	5	Darren Lim Fang Yue (SIN)	52.13	Q
6	2	3	Jessie Khing Lacuna (PHI)	52.13	Q
8	2	4	Daniel Bego (MAS)	52.17	Q
9	3	6	Napat Wesshasartar (THA)	52.33	
10	3	3	Alexis Wijaya Ohmar (INA)	52.48	
11	2	6	Pham Thanh Nguyen (VIE)	53.16	
12	1	6	Ye Myint Hein (MYA)	54.26	
13	3	2	Chamraen Youri Maximov (CAM)	57.71	
14	2	2	Myat Thu Oo (MYA)	58.48	
15	1	2	Thol Thoeun (CAM)	1:00.89	
16	3	7	Soulasen Phommasen (LAO)	1:01.95	
17	2	7	Saylom Souvannala (LAO)	1:04.58	

=== Final ===
Rank	Lane	Athlete	Time	Notes
1st place, gold medalist(s)	4	Triady Fauzi Sidiq (INA)	49.99	GR
2nd place, silver medalist(s)	3	Hoang Quy Phuoc (VIE)	50.52	
3rd place, bronze medalist(s)	5	Danny Yeo (SIN)	50.83	
4	8	Daniel Bego (MAS)	51.21	
5	1	Jessie Khing Lacuna (PHI)	51.52	
6	6	Cholawat Phoduang (THA)	51.64	
7	7	Darren Lim Fang Yue (SIN)	51.65	
8	2	Lim Ching Hwang (MAS)	52.04	
