= Myanmar Badminton Federation =

Governing body of badminton in Myanmar

- Sport: Badminton
- Abbreviation: MBF
- Affiliation: BWF, BAC
- Headquarters: Lanmadaw Township, Yangon
- President: Aung Paing
- Secretary: Nyan Lywin

The Myanmar Badminton Federation is the badminton organization of Myanmar. It was founded in the late 1950s and later on it became a member of the Badminton World Federation and the Badminton Asia Confederation. The MBF's main court is located in 320/332, Anawrahta Street West Gymnasium, Lanmadaw Township, Yangon, Myanmar.
