= Badminton at the 1965 SEAP Games – Women's team =

Badminton – Men's team at the 1965 Southeast Asian Peninsular Games
- Venue: Selangor Badminton Association Hall
- Dates: 15 December 1965
- Nations: 4

Medalists
gold medal	Thailand (THA)
silver medal	Malaysia (MAL)
bronze medal	Singapore (SIN)

The women's team badminton tournament at the 1965 SEAP Games was held from 15 to 16 December 1965 at the Selangor Badminton Association Hall, Kuala Lumpur, Malaysia. The tournament was held along with the men's team event. There were only three teams present in the event, the teams were Thailand, Singapore and hosts Malaysia. Burma withdrew from the event.

According to Sin Chew Daily, the Burmese women's team consisted of players who were also competing in athletics at the Games and could not compete due to athletics coinciding with the badminton team events. Therefore, the team withdrew at the last second. Thailand were automatically granted a place in the finals and the bronze medal play-off will not be played.

== Schedule ==
All times are Malaysia Standard Time (UTC+07:30)

Date	Time	Event
Wednesday, 15 December	14:00	Semi-final
Wednesday, 15 December	19:00	Bronze medal match
Wednesday, 15 December	19:00	Gold medal match

== Bracket ==
Semi-finals
Thailand (THA)	w/o
Burma (BIR)
Singapore (SIN)	0
Malaysia (MAL)	3

Gold medal match
Thailand (THA)	3
Malaysia (MAL)	2
Bronze medal match
Burma (BIR)
Singapore (SIN)	w/o

== Semi-finals ==
=== Thailand vs Burma ===
Thailand
-
Selangor Badminton Association Hall
15 December 1965, 14:00

Burma
Withdrew

		1	2	3
1	(Thailand) (Myanmar)
2	(Thailand) (Myanmar)
3	(Thailand) (Myanmar)
4	(Thailand) (Myanmar)
5	(Thailand) (Myanmar)

=== Malaysia vs Singapore ===
Malaysia
3
Selangor Badminton Association Hall
15 December 1965, 14:00

Singapore
0

			1	2	3
1	(Malaysia) (Singapore)	Rosalind Singha Ang; Lim Choo Eng	11; 5	11; 1
2	(Malaysia) (Singapore)	Teoh Siew Yong; Amy Yap	11; 3	11; 0
3	(Malaysia) (Singapore)	Ho Cheng Yoke / Sylvia Tan; Aishah Attan / Woo Ti Soo	15; 3	15; 0
4	(Malaysia) (Singapore)	Teoh Siew Yong; Lim Choo Eng				not played
5	(Malaysia) (Singapore)	Rosalind Singha Ang; Amy Yap				not played

== Bronze medal match ==
=== Singapore vs Burma ===
Singapore
-
Selangor Badminton Association Hall
15 December 1965, 19:00

Burma
Withdrew

		1	2	3
1	(Singapore) (Myanmar)
2	(Singapore) (Myanmar)
3	(Singapore) (Myanmar)
4	(Singapore) (Myanmar)
5	(Singapore) (Myanmar)

== Gold medal match ==
=== Malaysia vs Thailand ===
Malaysia
2
Selangor Badminton Association Hall
16 December 1965, 19:00

Thailand
3

			1	2	3
1	(Malaysia) (Thailand)	Rosalind Singha Ang; Pratuang Pattabongse	11; 6	9; 11	11; 0
2	(Malaysia) (Thailand)	Teoh Siew Yong; Sumol Chanklum	4; 11	11; 2	11; 5
3	(Malaysia) (Thailand)	Ho Cheng Yoke / Sylvia Tan; Pachara Pattabongse / Pratuang Pattabongse	8; 15	9; 15
4	(Malaysia) (Thailand)	Rosalind Singha Ang; Sumol Chanklum	1; 11	11; 8	3; 11
5	(Malaysia) (Thailand)	Teoh Siew Yong; Pratuang Pattabongse	6; 11	3; 11

== See also ==
- Individual event tournament
- Men's team tournament
