= Badminton at the 1965 SEAP Games – Men's team =

Badminton – Men's team at the 1965 Southeast Asian Peninsular Games
- Venue: Selangor Badminton Association Hall
- Dates: 15 December 1965
- Nations: 6

Medalists
gold medal	Malaysia (MAL)
silver medal	Thailand (THA)
bronze medal	Singapore (SIN)

The men's team badminton tournament at the 1965 SEAP Games was held from 15 to 16 December 1965 at the Selangor Badminton Association Hall, Kuala Lumpur, Malaysia. This was the first occasion in which the team competition was held in the SEAP Games.

== Schedule ==
All times are Malaysia Standard Time (UTC+07:30)

Date	Time	Event
Wednesday, 15 December	09:00	First round
Wednesday, 15 December	14:00	Semi-final
Wednesday, 15 December	19:00	Bronze medal match
Wednesday, 15 December	19:00	Gold medal match

== Bracket ==
First round
Laos (LAO)	3
South Vietnam (VNM)	0

Semi-finals
Malaysia (MAL)	3
Laos (LAO)	0
Singapore (SIN)	0
Thailand (THA)	3

Gold medal match
Malaysia (MAL)	3
Thailand (THA)	1
Bronze medal match
Laos (LAO)	2
Singapore (SIN)	3

== First round ==
=== Laos vs South Vietnam ===
Laos
3
Selangor Badminton Association Hall
15 December 1965, 09:00

South Vietnam
0

			1	2	3
1	(Laos) (South Vietnam)	Boun Minh; Âu Tâm Đế	15; 2	15; 3
2	(Laos) (South Vietnam)	Champadeng Outhabong; Lâm Trình	15; 3	15; 12
3	(Laos) (South Vietnam)	Champadeng Outhabong / Bounpheng Siaksone; Nguyễn Văn Ngọc / Thái Luân Hiển	15; 4	15; 3
4	(Laos) (South Vietnam)	Souvanthong Thammavongsa; Nguyễn Khương Phước				not played
5	(Laos) (South Vietnam)	Boun Minh; Nguyễn Văn Ngọc				not played

== Semi-finals ==
=== Malaysia vs Laos ===
Malaysia
3
Selangor Badminton Association Hall
15 December 1965, 14:00

Laos
0

			1	2	3
1	(Malaysia) (Kingdom of Laos)	Yew Cheng Hoe; Champadeng Outhabong	15; 2	15; 1
2	(Malaysia) (Kingdom of Laos)	Tan Aik Huang; Boun Minh	15; 1	15; 4
3	(Malaysia) (Kingdom of Laos)	Ng Boon Bee / Tan Yee Khan; Champadeng Outhabong / Bounpheng Siaksone	18; 13	15; 1
4	(Malaysia) (Kingdom of Laos)	Yew Cheng Hoe; Boun Minh				not played
5	(Malaysia) (Kingdom of Laos)	Tan Aik Huang; Champadeng Outhabong				not played

=== Thailand vs Singapore ===
Thailand
3
Selangor Badminton Association Hall
15 December 1965, 14:00

Singapore
0

			1	2	3
1	(Thailand) (Singapore)	Sangob Rattanusorn; Wong Tew Ghee	15; 7	15; 6
2	(Thailand) (Singapore)	Soonchai Akyapisut; Wee Sen	15; 5	15; 6
3	(Thailand) (Singapore)	Narong Bhornchima / Raphi Kanchanaraphi; Omar Ibrahim / Ismail Ibrahim	15; 6	15; 3
4	(Thailand) (Singapore)	Soonchai Akyapisut; Wong Tew Ghee				not played
5	(Thailand) (Singapore)	Sangob Rattanusorn; Wee Sen				not played

== Bronze medal match ==
=== Singapore vs Laos ===
Singapore
3
Selangor Badminton Association Hall
16 December 1965, 19:00

Laos
2

			1	2	3
1	(Singapore) (Laos)	Wong Tew Ghee; Souvanthong Thammavongsa	15; 4	15; 7
2	(Singapore) (Laos)	Wee Sen; Boun Minh	15; 5	15; 6
3	(Singapore) (Laos)	Omar Ibrahim / Ismail Ibrahim; Champadeng Outhabong / Bounpheng Siaksone	15; 18	14; 18
4	(Singapore) (Laos)	Wong Tew Ghee; Boun Minh				w/o
5	(Singapore) (Laos)	Wee Sen; Souvanthong Thammavongsa	15; 3	15; 5

== Gold medal match ==
=== Malaysia vs Thailand ===
Malaysia
3
Selangor Badminton Association Hall
16 December 1965, 19:00

Thailand
1

			1	2	3
1	(Malaysia) (Thailand)	Yew Cheng Hoe; Narong Bhornchima	10; 15	15; 10	15; 6
2	(Malaysia) (Thailand)	Tan Aik Huang; Sangob Rattanusorn	11; 15	7; 15
3	(Malaysia) (Thailand)	Ng Boon Bee / Tan Yee Khan; Narong Bhornchima / Raphi Kanchanaraphi	15; 11	15; 7
4	(Malaysia) (Thailand)	Yew Cheng Hoe; Sangob Rattanusorn	4; 15	15; 10	15; 3
5	(Malaysia) (Thailand)	Tan Aik Huang; Narong Bhornchima				not played

== See also ==
- Individual event tournament
- Women's team tournament
