= 2008 ASEAN University Games =

2008 sporting event

XIV ASEAN University Games
- Host city: Kuala Lumpur, Malaysia
- Motto: Together We Reach for the Stars (Malay: Bersama Kita Menggapai Bintang)
- Nations: 10
- Athletes: 1789
- Events: 219 in 21 sports
- Opening: 11 December
- Closing: 21 December
- Main venue: Bukit Jalil National Stadium (Opening); Putra Stadium (Closing)
- Website: 2008 ASEAN University Games

The 2008 ASEAN University Games, (Malay: Sukan Universiti ASEAN 2008) officially known as the 14th ASEAN University Games, (Malay: Sukan Universiti ASEAN ke-14) was a Southeast Asian university multi-sport event held in Kuala Lumpur, Malaysia from 11 to 21 December 2008. This was the third time Malaysia hosted the games after 1984 and 1993.

Around 1789 athletes participated at the event which featured 219 events in 21 sports. The final medal tally was led by host Malaysia.

== Venues ==
The 14th ASEAN University Games had 24 venues for the games, 9 in Kuala Lumpur, 14 in Selangor and 1 in Negeri Sembilan.

State	Competition Venue	Sports
Kuala Lumpur	National Sports Complex, Malaysia
Kuala Lumpur	Bukit Jalil National Stadium	Athletics, Opening ceremony
Kuala Lumpur	National Aquatic Center, Bukit Jalil	Swimming
Kuala Lumpur	Putra Stadium	Closing ceremony
Kuala Lumpur	Family Park	Volleyball (Beach)
Kuala Lumpur	National Hockey Stadium	Hockey
Kuala Lumpur	Others
Kuala Lumpur	Bukit Kiara Sports Complex	Netball
Kuala Lumpur	Kuala Lumpur Badminton Stadium	Badminton
Kuala Lumpur	MABA Stadium	Basketball
Kuala Lumpur	University of Malaya	Pencak silat
Selangor	National University of Malaysia
Selangor	Danau Golf Club	Golf
Selangor	Tun Abdul Razak Chancellor Hall	Karate
Selangor	Squash Complex	Squash
Selangor	Gemilang Hall	Table tennis
Selangor	Universiti Teknologi MARA
Selangor	Stadium	Rugby sevens
Selangor	Sports complex	Sepak takraw
Selangor	Others
Selangor	Universiti Putra Malaysia	Archery
Selangor	Petronas Stadium Bangi	Football (group)
Selangor	Maybank Stadium Bangi	Football (Finals, semi-finals, group)
Selangor	Panasonic Sport Complex Shah Alam	Futsal
Selangor	Bayuemas Lawn Bowls Indoor Stadium	Lawn bowls
Selangor	Subang National Shooting Range	Shooting
Selangor	Sunway Pyramid	Bowling
Selangor	Shah Alam City Council Hall	Volleyball (Indoor)
Negeri Sembilan	Universiti Sains Islam Malaysia	Taekwondo

== Branding and design ==
A1 Angkasawan, the official mascot of the games.

The logo of the games is an image of a red brush stroke human figure which represents high spirit, glory, victory, power and strength. The stars on the logo represent the targets and ambitions of the athletes. The font used for the logo, a mixture of Century Gothic and Trajan, represents the games being an event that has a variety of formal and informal agendas, while the font's stair-like arrangement represents the desire to achieve success. Meanwhile, the colours used for the font (blue, red, white and yellow) are the colours of the Malaysian flag, the ASEAN logo and the flags of its member nations.

The official mascot of the games is A1 Angkasawan the astronaut, who is described as friendly, smart, high-spirited and strong. The aim of using a cartoon astronaut as the event's mascot was to remind people about Malaysia's achievement as the first ASEAN member country to send an astronaut to space back in 2007. The mortar board of the mascot represents the academic excellent and the participation of university students as athletes of the games. The logo on the chest represents the sportsmanship spirit of the athletes participating at the games. The colours of the mascot (blue, red, white and yellow) represent Malaysia as the host of the games, with blue also representing the symbol of excellence in hosting the games. The mascot also represents the determination of participating athletes to achieve their respective dreams.

"Menggapai bintang" (Reach for the stars) was the theme song of the games. It was composed by Mohd Zaki Bin Ahmad from Universiti Malaysia Pahang and sung by Shahnizal bt. Mohd Arshad with lyrics written by Ahmad Fedtri Bin Yahya.

The Games' torch is shaped like a pen, an instrument commonly used in worldwide universities.

== The games ==
=== Participating nations ===
- Brunei
- Cambodia
- Indonesia
- Laos
- Malaysia
- Philippines
- Singapore
- Thailand
- Timor-Leste
- Vietnam

Note: Myanmar did not participate

=== Sports ===
- Archery (8)
- Athletics (39)
- Badminton (7)
- Basketball (1)
- Bowling (13)
- Football (1)
- Futsal (1)
- Golf (4)
- Hockey (1)
- Karate (19)
- Lawn bowls (10)
- Netball (1)
- Pencak silat (18)
- Rugby sevens (1)
- Sepak takraw (3)
- Shooting (24)
- Squash (3)
- Swimming (38)
- Table tennis (7)
- Taekwondo (16)
- Volleyball (4)

=== Calendar ===
OC	Opening ceremony	●	Event competitions	1	Gold medal events	CC	Closing ceremony

December	11 Thu	12 Fri	13 Sat	14 Sun	15 Mon	16 Tue	17 Wed	18 Thu	19 Fri	20 Sat	21 Sun	Events
Ceremonies	OC										CC	—N/a
Archery					●	●	4	4				8
Athletics					6	12	9	12				39
Badminton				●	●	2	●	●	5			7
Basketball	●	●	●	●	1							1
Bowling			2	2	1	2	2	4				13
Football		●		●		●		●		1		1
Futsal						●	●	●	●	1		1
Golf					●	●	●	4				4
Hockey					●	●	●		●	1		1
Karate						6	6	7				19
Lawn bowls					●	●	●	2	4	4		10
Netball						●	●	●	1			1
Pencak silat					●	2	4	●	12			18
Rugby sevens						●	●	1				1
Sepak takraw				●	1	●	●	1	1			3
Shooting						4	6	6	6	2		24
Squash							●	●	2	1		3
Swimming							10	8	10	10		38
Table tennis		●	●	3	2	●	2					7
Taekwondo							6	6	4			16
Volleyball			●	●	●	●	●	4				4
Daily medal events			2	5	11	28	49	59	45	20	0	219
Cumulative total			2	7	18	46	95	154	199	219	219	219
December	11 Thu	12 Fru	13 Sat	14 Sun	15 Mon	16 Tue	17 Wed	18 Thu	19 Fri	20 Sat	21 Sun	Events

== Medal table ==
* Host nation (Malaysia)

Rank	NOC	Gold	Silver	Bronze	Total
1	Malaysia (MAS)*	90	79	47	216
2	Vietnam (VIE)	45	28	23	96
3	Thailand (THA)	32	29	59	120
4	Indonesia (INA)	28	52	48	128
5	Singapore (SIN)	18	16	39	73
6	Philippines (PHI)	8	12	21	41
7	Laos (LAO)	1	2	3	6
8	Timor-Leste (TLS)	0	1	9	10
9	Brunei (BRU)	0	0	2	2
10	Cambodia (CAM)	0	0	1	1
Totals (10 entries)		222	219	252	693

== Results ==
=== Archery ===
Preceded by Hanoi	ASEAN University Games; Kuala Lumpur; XIV ASEAN University Games (2008)	Succeeded by Chiang Mai
