= Badminton Asia =

Governing body of badminton in Asia

- Abbreviation: BA
- Type: Sports federation
- Headquarters: Petaling Jaya, Malaysia
- Members: 43 member associations
- President: (South Korea) Kim Joong-soo
- Website: www.badmintonasia.org

Badminton Asia is the governing body of badminton in Asia. It is one of the five continental bodies under the flag of the Badminton World Federation. Established in 1959, it was headquartered in Kuala Lumpur, Malaysia until it moved to Maldives briefly in 2021. In 2023, it was announced that it would be moved back to Malaysia. It aims to maintain Asia as the benchmark for world badminton in many years to come. It now has 43 member federations. At the Annual General Meeting in July 2006, the name of the confederation was changed from Asian Badminton Confederation to Badminton Asia Confederation.

During Badminton Asia Extraordinary General Meeting on 16 October 2015 in Kuwait, the organization re-branded itself by unveiling the new logo for the confederation renaming the organization as Badminton Asia.

== Member associations ==
Zones:

=== West (11) ===
- Bahrain
- Iran
- Iraq
- Jordan
- Kuwait
- Lebanon
- Palestine
- Qatar
- Saudi Arabia
- Syria
- United Arab Emirates

=== Central (5) ===
- Kazakhstan
- Kyrgyzstan
- Tajikistan
- Turkmenistan
- Uzbekistan

=== South (8) ===
- Afghanistan
- Bangladesh
- Bhutan
- India
- Maldives
- Nepal
- Pakistan
- Sri Lanka

=== East (8) ===
- China
- Hong Kong
- Japan
- Macau
- Mongolia
- North Korea
- South Korea
- Chinese Taipei

=== Southeast (11) ===
- Brunei
- Cambodia
- Indonesia
- Laos
- Malaysia
- Myanmar
- Philippines
- Singapore
- Thailand
- (Timor-Leste) Timor Leste
- Vietnam

=== Associate members ===
- Oman
- Yemen

== Tournaments ==
Tournament	Latest	Champions	Next
Asia Championships	2025	Various	2026
Asia Team Championships	2024	China India	2026
Asia Mixed Team Championships	2025	Indonesia	2027

- Asia Junior Championships (1997–)
- Asia U17 & U15 Championships (2006–)
- Asia Para Championships (2008–)
- Asia Senior Championships (2020–)
