= 2016 ASEAN University Games =

Sports event in Singapore

XVIII ASEAN University Games
- Host city: Singapore
- Motto: In Celebration of Diversity and Unity
- Nations: 11
- Athletes: 1000
- Events: 173 in 15 sports
- Opening: 10 July
- Closing: 19 July
- Opened by: Ong Ye Kung; Acting Minister of Education
- Athlete's Oath: Mervyn Teo
- Judge's Oath: Mohd Azhar Bin Yusof
- Torch lighter: Ang Han Teng and Nur Shafiqa Binti Sheik Alauddin
- Main venue: Nanyang Technological University (Opening); National University of Singapore (Closing)
- Website: 2016 ASEAN University Games

The 2016 ASEAN University Games, officially known as the 18th ASEAN University Games, was a Southeast Asian university multi-sports event held in Singapore. This was the third time Singapore hosted the ASEAN University Games, and its first time since 1994. Previously, Singapore also hosted the 1986 games.

The games was held from 10 to 19 July 2016, although several events had commenced from 9 July 2016. Around 1000 athletes from 11 participating nations participated at the games which featured 173 events in 15 sports. It was opened by Ong Ye Kung, the acting minister of education of Singapore at the Nanyang Technological University. The final medal tally was led by Thailand, with host Singapore in fifth place.

== Venues ==
The 18th ASEAN University Games had 15 venues for the games with the Nanyang Technological University served as the athletes' village.

Competition Venue	Sports
Nanyang Technological University
Auditorium	Opening ceremony
National Institute of Education	Archery
Sports Hall 2, 3	Basketball, Table tennis
Main field	Football
Field 2	Rugby sevens
National University of Singapore
Town green	Closing Ceremony
Utown2	Fencing
Multi purpose sports hall	Volleyball
Others
Silat and Sepak Takraw Centre of Excellence	Pencak Silat, Sepak Takraw
OCBC Aquatic Centre	Swimming, Water Polo
Choa Chu Kang Stadium	Athletics
The Promontory, Marina Bay	Canoeing
Singapore Institute of Management	Badminton
Toa Payoh Sports Complex	Petanque
SAFRA Yishun	Shooting

== Marketing ==
Nila, the lion, the official mascot of the games.

=== Motto ===
The official motto of the 2016 ASEAN University Games is In Celebration of Diversity and Unity. It was chosen to represent celebration of common goals, achievements, and love of sport, showcase of dedication, skills, and sense of fair play and celebration of passion to excel despite the difference in racial and lingual identity.

=== Logo ===
The logo of the 2016 ASEAN University Games is an image of the stylised brush strokes of the ASEAN University Games acronym, AUG surrounded by 11 stars of blue, yellow and red colour. The stylised brush strokes of the logo represents the youth, energy, and vibrancy of the games. The eleven stars, representing the 10 ASEAN countries and the candidate nation Timor-Leste that participates at the games. The brush stroke across the letter G that slants upward towards the first of the eleven stars represents the idea that sport provides a pathway for bringing people together to create and share common goals and purpose. The three colours of the stars, which are red, blue, and yellow, the common colours of the ASEAN countries, represent the inclusiveness of the university games. The logo overall, represents the aspirations of the ASEAN countries through sports and also the diversity and unity of the participants.

=== Mascot ===
The mascot of the 2016 ASEAN University Games is a lion named Nila, which is also previously the mascot of the 2015 Southeast Asian Games and the 2015 ASEAN Para Games. The name comes from Sang Nila Utama, the founder of Singapura. Nila has a red mane and heart-shaped face and is described as courage, passionate and friendly. The rehash of Nila as the mascot of the games is meant to promote friendship and ASEAN solidarity in the youth of ASEAN through sports.

== The games ==
=== Opening ceremony ===
The opening ceremony was held at the Nanyang Technological University Auditorium at 20:00 (SST) on 10 July 2016. Before the opening ceremony, Singapore university students put up a series of performance with mascot Nila making its appearance for a brief while. The Opening ceremony begins with the performance by Singapore Dance Crew, followed by the parade of athletes from the participating nations of the games, began with the Brunei delegate. The Singaporean delegate received the warmest welcome when they marched into the auditorium. After the athletes marched into the auditorium, the National Anthem of Singapore was sung by Sophie Zara. After that, Dr. Tan Eng Liang, the chairman of the games organising committee and the vice president of the Singapore National Olympic Council and Prof Datuk Dr Abdullah Mohamad Said, the president of ASEAN University Sports Council then gave their respective speech and the games was declared open by acting minister of education of Singapore, Mr Ong Ye Kung after he gave his speech. After the games was declared open, Mervyn Teo took the athletes' oath and Mohd Azhar Bin Yusof took the judge's oath. Ang Han Teng and Nur Shafiqa Binti Sheik Alauddin then took the torch into the auditorium and lit the cauldron on the stage. The ceremony concludes with a series of dance performance, including the traditional dances of Singapore's main races by Singapore university students.

=== Closing ceremony ===
The closing ceremony was held at the National University of Singapore Town Green at 20:00 (SST) on 19 July 2016. The closing ceremony begins with the participating athletes walked to the center of the field, followed by a dance performance by Singapore university students. After that, Dr. Tan Eng Liang, the chairman of the games organising committee and the vice president of the Singapore National Olympic Council and Prof Datuk Dr Abdullah Mohamad Said, the president of ASEAN University Sports Council then gave their respective speech and the games was declared close by Ms Sim Ann, Senior Minister of State of the Ministry of Culture, Community and Youth and Ministry of Finance. Sophie Zara then performed a song, with the games' flags lowered and the cauldron extinguished. After that, the ASEAN University Games responsibility was handed over to Myanmar, host of the 2018 ASEAN University Games where Dr Thien Wi, President of the Myanmar University Sports Federation receive the ASEAN University Sports Federation flag as its symbol. The national flag of Myanmar was raised as the National Anthem of Myanmar was played. The ceremony concluded with a Myanmar Segment Performance and an after-ceremony rock concert, featuring rock bands from five different Singapore universities.

=== Participating nations ===
- Brunei
- Cambodia
- Indonesia
- Laos
- Malaysia
- Myanmar
- Philippines
- Singapore
- Thailand
- Timor-Leste
- Vietnam

=== Sports ===
- Archery (10)
- Athletics (37)
- Badminton (7)
- Basketball (2)
- Canoeing (21)
- Fencing (11)
- Football (1)
- Pencak silat (18)
- Pétanque (7)
- Rugby sevens (1)
- Sepak takraw (2)
- Shooting (8)
- Swimming (38)
- Table tennis (7)
- Volleyball (2)
- Water polo (1)

=== Calendar ===
OC	Opening ceremony	●	Event competition	1	Gold medal events	CC	Closing ceremony

July	9th Sat	10th Sun	11th Mon	12th Tue	13th Wed	14th Thu	15th Fri	16th Sat	17th Sun	18th Mon	19th Tue	Events
Ceremonies		OC									CC	—N/a
Archery						●	●	●	10			10
Athletics						9	11	8	9			37
Badminton				●	●	2	●	●	5			7
Basketball			●	●	●	●	●		2			2
Canoeing							●	6	15			21
Fencing						●	5	●	6			11
Football	●		●		●		●		1			1
Pencak silat					●	2	2	●	14			18
Petanque						●	3	●	2	2		7
Rugby sevens								1				1
Sepak takraw					●	●	1	●	●	1		2
Shooting						4	4					8
Swimming				11	7	10	10					38
Table tennis				●	●	2	●	●	5			7
Volleyball			●	●	●	●	●	2				2
Water polo								●	●	●	1	1
Daily medal events				11	7	29	36	17	69	3	1	173
Cumulative total				11	18	47	83	100	169	172	173	173
July	9th Sat	10th Sun	11th Mon	12th Tue	13th Wed	14th Thu	15th Fri	16th Sat	17th Sun	18th Mon	19th Tue	Total events

=== Medal table ===
* Host nation (Singapore)

Rank	Nation	Gold	Silver	Bronze	Total
1	Thailand (THA)	51	35	34	120
2	Indonesia (INA)	32	54	27	113
3	Malaysia (MAS)	27	29	33	89
4	Vietnam (VIE)	26	10	13	49
5	Singapore (SIN)*	24	20	33	77
6	Philippines (PHI)	6	12	18	36
7	Cambodia (CAM)	4	1	2	7
8	Laos (LAO)	3	9	10	22
9	Timor-Leste (TLS)	0	2	2	4
10	Myanmar (MYA)	0	1	0	1
11	Brunei (BRU)	0	0	0	0
Totals (11 entries)		173	173	172	518

== Results ==
=== Archery ===
Event	Gold	Silver	Bronze
Men Individual Recurve	Teo Kee Hui Keith; Singapore	Nugraha Nucky; Indonesia	Yahya Rudini Yushari; Indonesia
Men Team Recurve	Singapore; Ong Yong Jia; Teo Kee Hui Keith; Zhang Zhenjie Justin	Indonesia; Edwar Alek; Nugraha Nucky; Yahya Rudini Yushari	Malaysia; Muhammad Shaiffuddin Mohd Kamro; Omar Nazir; Rosli Muhamad Fareez
Women Individual Recurve	Ayuni Mesra; Indonesia	Quah Kai Zhi; Singapore	Teo Zhi Ning; Singapore
Women Team Recurve	Malaysia; Abdullah Azuanis; Azizi Nur Atiqah; Mohamed Hamzah Ezryn Meza	Singapore; Quah Kai Zhi; Teo Zhi Ning; Wong Shi Ya Crystal	Thailand; Sukanya Buayen; Nanthiya Kharuram; Jidapa Swangpharnich
Mixed Team Recurve	Singapore; Teo Kee Hui Keith; Teo Zhi Ning	Malaysia; Mohamed Hamzah Ezryn Meza; Rosli Muhamad Fareez	Thailand; Sukanya Buayen; Wachiranarong Tinrasri
Men Individual Compound	Ruslan Zulfadhli; Malaysia	Mazuki Mohd Juwaidi; Malaysia	Wardhana Prima Wisnu; Indonesia
Men Team Compound	Malaysia; Mazuki Mohd Juwaidi; Ruslan Zulfadhli; Saeri Ahmad Syafiq Azim	Thailand; Poovanai Budtho; Jatuthep Muenhong; Worrayut Sornpala	Singapore; Aang Han Teng; Pang Qing Liang; Tay Han Yueh Shawn
Women Individual Compound	Mat Salleh Fatin Nurfatehah; Malaysia	Mohd Asmi Nurul Syazhera; Malaysia	Kanyavee Maneesombaktul; Thailand
Women Team Compound	Malaysia; Cham Nong Saritha; Mat Salleh Fatin Nurfatehah; Mohd Asmi Nurul Syazhera	Indonesia; Fitriana Norsa; Handayani Della Adisty; Ramadhani Tiara Sakti	Singapore; Ang Hwee Ying; Guanwan Christina; Ong Madeleine Xue Li
Mixed Team Compound	Malaysia; Mat Salleh Fatin Nurfatehah; Ruslan Zulfadhli	Indonesia; Ramadhani Tiara Sakti; Wardhana Prima Wisnu	Singapore; Ang Han Teng; Gunawan Christina

=== Athletics ===
Event	Gold		Silver		Bronze	
Men 100m	Nyepa Jonathan; Malaysia	10.62	Le Trong Hinh; Vietnam	10.66	Iswandi Iswandi; Indonesia	10.75
Men 200m	Jirapong Meenapra; Thailand	20.99	Le Trong Hinh; Vietnam	21.02	Kang Calvin Lee Loong; Singapore	21.97
Men 400m	Luong Van Thao; Vietnam	47.40	Apisit Chamsri; Thailand	47.99	Alet Mohamad Arif Zulhe; Malaysia	48.08
Men 800m	Neri Elbren; Philippines	1:52.69	Maniam Keesavan; Malaysia	1:53.49	Azman Putra Azrul Syazw; Malaysia	1:55.09
Men 1500m	Angus Jomar; Philippines	3:59.47	Neri Elbren; Philippines	3:59.51	Hamizan Ahmad Luth; Malaysia	4:00.03
Men 5000m	Le Van Thao; Vietnam	15:08.10	Nurshodiq Nurshodiq; Indonesia	15:11.78	Soundararajah Jeevanesh; Singapore	15:41.33
Men 10000m	Le Van Thao; Vietnam	31:49.07	Nurshodiq Nurshodiq; Indonesia	31:58.26	Thamavongchith Sysavath; Laos	33:31.75
Men 110m hurdles	Xaysa Anousone; Laos	14.06	Maholtra Rio; Indonesia	14.22	Ang Chen Xiang; Singapore	14.44
Men 400m hurdles	Andrian Andrian; Indonesia	52.83	Nattapong Khanom; Thailand	52.85	Bautista Clinton; Philippines	53.14
Men 3000m steeplechase	Hamizan Ahmad Luth; Malaysia	9:30.96	Angus Jomar; Philippines	9:41.49	Thamavongchith Sysavath; Laos	9:53.64
Men 4 × 100 m relay	Thailand	40.41	Indonesia	40.52	Malaysia	40.98
Men 4 × 400 m relay	Thailand	3:14.85	Indonesia	3:15.25	Malaysia	3:15.89
Men High jump	Nguyen Thanh Nhan; Vietnam	2.13m	Angus Jomar; Philippines	2.00m	Thamavongchith Sysavath; Laos	2.00m
Men Long jump	Sawaturrahman Sawaturrahman; Indonesia	7.50m	Ubas Janry; Philippines	7.50m	Nguyen Van Cong; Vietnam	7.41m
Men Triple jump	Nguyen Van Cong; Vietnam	15.61m	Muhammad Hussain Ismail; Malaysia	14.67m	Khan Meng Linn; Singapore	14.35m
Men Pole vault	Porranot Purahong; Thailand	5.20m	Alwi Iskandar; Malaysia	5.05m	Wicaksono Eko; Indonesia	4.60m
Men Discus throw	Irfan Shamsuddin; Malaysia	54.25m	Aroonsil Malasri; Thailand	47.10m	Phan Than Binh; Vietnam	43.01m
Men Javelin throw	Peerachet Jantra; Thailand	74.29m	Hafiz Abd; Indonesia	66.51m	Kenny Gonzales; Philippines	61.77m
Men Shot put	Husin Adi Alifuddin; Malaysia	16.33m	Thawat Khachin; Thailand	16.15m	Mohd Afandi Mohamad Hal; Malaysia	14.07m
Women 100m	Zulkifli Zaidatul Husniah; Malaysia	11.94	Nguyen Thi Oanh; Vietnam	12.27	Yuliana Yuliana; Indonesia	12.32
Women 200m	Supawan Thipat; Thailand	24.27	Zulkifli Zaidatul Husniah; Malaysia	24.36	Nguyen Thi Oanh; Vietnam	24.96
Women 400m	Hoang Thi Ngoc; Vietnam	54.65	Mayasari Sri Rahayu; Indonesia	55.38	Mazlan Nurul Faizah Asm; Malaysia	56.44
Women 800m	Inthakouman Lodkeo; Laos	2:15.75	Pamatian Louielyn; Philippines	2:17.57	Dos Santos Mariquita; Timor-Leste	2:22.54
Women 1500m	Nguyen Thi Oanh; Vietnam	4:34.10	Paijo Afriana; Indonesia	4:45.63	Sivakumar Sharmila; Malaysia	4:50.25
Women 5000m	Pham Thi Hue; Vietnam	17:57.00	Inthakoumman Lodkeo; Laos	18:22.33	Napoleao Juventina; Timor-Leste	19:24.71
Women 10000m	Pham Thi Hue; Vietnam	38:07.22	Napoleao Juventina; Timor-Leste	41:08.50	Neo Hoon Suan; Singapore	42:30.03
Women 100m hurdles	Emilia Nova; Indonesia	13.97	Chanthavong Manivanh; Laos	14.51	Mohd Ali Aini Nurazira; Malaysia	14.71
Women 400m hurdles	Avila Marylyn; Philippines	1:02.22	Jutamas Khonkham; Thailand	1:02.44	Suhaimi Saidatul; Malaysia	1:02.61
Women 3000m steeplechase	Nguyen Thi Oanh; Vietnam	10:21.00	Paijo Afriana; Indonesia	11:27.02	Gagnao Joida; Philippines	12:02.96
Women 4 × 100 m relay	Thailand	46.06	Indonesia	46.80	Malaysia	46.99
Women 4 × 400 m relay	Vietnam	3:47.66	Thailand	3:48.67	Indonesia	3:50.89
Women High jump	Duong Thi Viet Anh; Vietnam	1.82m	Yeap Sean Yee; Malaysia	1.79m	Nguyen Thi Hoai Nhi; Vietnam	1.76m
Women Long jump	Muhammad Zuki Noor Shah; Malaysia	5.95m	Tran Hue Hoa; Vietnam	5.70m	Chanthavong Manivanh; Laos	5.17m
Women Triple jump	Tran Hue Hoa; Vietnam	13.17m	Muhammad Zuki Noor Shah; Malaysia	13.11m	Phoutthavong Lanly; Laos	12.21m
Women Discus throw	Subenrat Insaeng; Thailand	56.37m	Choo Kang Ni; Malaysia	44.24m	Paosavad Phonexai; Laos	35.82m
Women Javelin throw	Bui Thi Xuan; Vietnam	49.03m	Palabrica Evalyn; Philippines	44.40m	Dequinan Sarah; Philippines	40.79m
Women Shot put	Areerat Intadis; Thailand	14.23m	Ishak Bibi Nuraishah; Malaysia	12.07m	Paosavad Phonexai; Laos	10.67m

=== Badminton ===
Event	Gold	Silver	Bronze
Men's singles	Zulfadli Zulkiffli; Malaysia	R Ivanudin; Indonesia	Setyaldi Putra; Indonesia
Women's singles	S Suwannakitborihan; Thailand	H Chua; Singapore	Natcha Saengchote; Thailand
Men's doubles	Thailand; Trawut Potieng; N Yordphaisong	Indonesia; A Putera; Rian Swastedian	Thailand; W Ampunsuwan; Tinn Isriyanet
Women's doubles	Thailand; C Chaladchalam; Phataimas Muenwong	Thailand; T Chanisa; P Chochuwong	Indonesia; Aris Budiharti; Dian Fitriani
Mixed doubles	Indonesia; A Putera; Dian Fitriani	Indonesia; Rian Swastedian; Aris Budiharti	Thailand; P Thongnuam; P Chochuwong
Men's team	Indonesia	Thailand	Malaysia
Women's team	Thailand	Indonesia	Malaysia

=== Basketball ===
Event	Gold	Silver	Bronze
Men's team	Indonesia	Thailand	Malaysia
Women's team	Thailand	Philippines	Malaysia

=== Canoeing ===
Event	Gold	Silver	Bronze
Men C1 200m	Thailand	Singapore	Thailand
Men C1 500m	Thailand	Singapore	Indonesia
Men C1 1000m	Indonesia	Singapore	Thailand
Men C2 200m	Singapore	Thailand	Singapore
Men C2 500m	Singapore	Thailand	Indonesia
Men C2 1000m	Singapore	Indonesia	Singapore
Men K1 200m	Singapore	Singapore	Indonesia
Men K1 500m	Singapore	Singapore	Thailand
Men K1 1000m	Singapore	Singapore	Indonesia
Men K2 200m	Singapore	Indonesia	Thailand
Men K2 500m	Indonesia	Singapore	Thailand
Men K2 1000m	Indonesia	Singapore	Thailand
Men K4 200m	Singapore	Thailand	Singapore
Men K4 500m	Singapore	Indonesia	Singapore
Men K4 1000m	Indonesia	Singapore	Thailand
Women K1 200m	Thailand	Indonesia	Vietnam
Women K1 500m	Vietnam	Thailand	Singapore
Women K2 200m	Thailand	Vietnam	Indonesia
Women K2 500m	Vietnam	Singapore	Singapore
Women K4 200m	Vietnam	Indonesia	Singapore
Women K4 500m	Vietnam	Indonesia	Singapore

=== Fencing ===
Event	Gold	Silver	Bronze
Men Individual Foil	Perez Nathaniel; Philippines	Zhang Zhenggang; Singapore	Nicanor Michael; Philippines
Men Individual Épée	Koh Joshua I Jie; Malaysia	Pratama Ryan; Indonesia	Jose Noelito Jr; Philippines
Men Individual Sabre	Phisullimah Ridey; Indonesia	Leu Uwe Yi Yang; Singapore	Concepcion Christian Hester; Philippines
Men Team Foil	Singapore	Philippines	Indonesia
Men Team Épée	Philippines	Malaysia	Singapore
Men Team Sabre	Indonesia	Malaysia	Thailand
Women Individual Foil	Abu Bakar Natasha Ezzra; Malaysia	Tinio Justine Gail; Philippines	Penaflor Dyren Faith; Philippines
Women Individual Épée	Wanwipa Thathongkueak; Thailand	Megawati Megawati; Indonesia	Lim Victoria Ann Xiu Yan; Singapore
Women Individual Sabre	Safitri Ima; Indonesia	Pornsavan Ngernrungruangroj; Thailand	Yong Christabel Mei Xin; Singapore
Women Team Foil	Philippines	Malaysia	Singapore
Women Team Sabre	Thailand	Indonesia	Philippines

=== Football ===
Event	Gold	Silver	Bronze
Men	Thailand	East Timor	Singapore

=== Swimming ===
Event	Gold		Silver		Bronze	
Men 50m Freestyle	Triady Fauzi Sidiq; Indonesia	22.79	Keith Lim Kit Sern; Malaysia	23.32	Kitiphat Pipimnan; Thailand	23.65
Men 100m Freestyle	Triady Fauzi Sidiq; Indonesia	50.22	Keith Lim Kit Sern; Malaysia	50.74	Danny Yeo Kai Quan; Singapore	50.93
Men 200m Freestyle	Danny Yeo Kai Quan; Singapore	1:50.79	Zheng Yang Yeap; Malaysia	1:52.63	Ricky Anggawijaya; Indonesia	1:52.90
Men 400m Freestyle	Pang Sheng Jun; Singapore	3:56.01	Aflah Fadlan Prawira; Indonesia	3:58.52	Kevin Yeap Soon Choy; Malaysia	4:00.96
Men 1500m Freestyle	Kevin Yeap Soon Choy; Malaysia	15:45.63	Peerapat Lertsathapornsuk; Thailand	16:06.24	Aflah Fadlan Prawira; Indonesia	16:15.48
Men 50m Backstroke	I Gede Siman Sudartawa; Indonesia	25.27	Ricky Anggawijaya; Indonesia	26.39	Kasipat Chograthin; Thailand	26.44
Men 100m Backstroke	I Gede Siman Sudartawa; Indonesia	55.38	Ricky Anggawijaya; Indonesia	57.00	Kasipat Chograthin; Thailand	58.80
200m Backstroke	Ricky Anggawijaya; Indonesia	2:02.75	I Gede Siman Sudartawa; Indonesia	2:04.46	Settawut Manomaisakul; Thailand	2:11.65
50m Breaststroke	Wong Fu Kang; Malaysia	28.91	Gagarin Nathaniel; Indonesia	29.08	Dennis Joshua Tiwa; Indonesia	29.15
100m Breaststroke	Gagarin Nathaniel; Indonesia	1:02.71	Dennis Joshua Tiwa; Indonesia	1:03.63	Wong Fu Kang; Malaysia	1:03.70
200m Breaststroke	Lionel Khoo; Singapore	2:16.19	Dennis Joshua Tiwa; Indonesia	2:16.61	Gagarin Nathaniel; Indonesia	2:17.74
50m Butterfly	Triady Fauzi Sidiq; Indonesia	24.40	Navaphat Wongcharoen; Thailand	25.23	Yang Chan; Malaysia	25.44
100m Butterfly	Triady Fauzi Sidiq; Indonesia	52.88	Navaphat Wongcharoen; Thailand	54.69	Keith Lim Kit Sern; Malaysia	55.66
200m Butterfly	Navaphat Wongcharoen; Thailand	2:02.56	Tia'a Faang Der; Malaysia	2:04.55	Muhammad Hamgari; Indonesia	2:05.13
200m Individual Medley	Lionel Khoo; Singapore	2:04.26	Jiarapong Sangkhawat; Thailand	2:07.44	Muhammad Hamgari; Indonesia	2:07.89
400m Individual Medley	Pang Sheng Jun; Singapore	4:25.29	Jiarapong Sangkhawat; Thailand	4:29.29	Muhammad Hamgari; Indonesia	4:33.10
4 × 100 m Freestyle Relay	Indonesia	3:36.72	Malaysia	3:27.01	Thailand	3:28.35
4 × 200 m Freestyle Relay	Malaysia	7:34.21	Indonesia	7:34.66	Thailand	7:39.64
4 × 100 m Medley Relay	Indonesia	3:44.94	Thailand	3:50.60	Malaysia	3:50.66
Women 50m Freestyle	Amanda Lim; Singapore	25.70	Jenjira Srisaard; Thailand	26.02	Lai Kwan Chui; Malaysia	26.56
Women 100m Freestyle	Amanda Lim; Singapore	56.58	Benjaporn Sriphanomthorn; Thailand	57.62	Hannah Dato; Philippines	58.13
Women 200m Freestyle	Benjaporn Sriphanomthorn; Thailand	2:04.15	Cai Lin Khoo; Malaysia	2:05.13	Raina Saumi Grahana Ramdhani; Indonesia	2:05.42
Women 400m Freestyle	Benjaporn Sriphanomthorn; Thailand	4:19.72	Raina Saumi Grahana Ramdhani; Indonesia	4:20.38	Ammiga Himathongkom; Thailand	4:21.82
Women 800m Freestyle	Benjaporn Sriphanomthorn; Thailand	8:51.19	Raina Saumi Grahana Ramdhani; Indonesia	8:53.61	Ammiga Himathongkom; Thailand	9:17.83
50m Backstroke	Araya Wongvat; Thailand	30.32	Yessy Venisia Yosaputra; Indonesia	31.18	Patricia Yosita Hapsari; Indonesia	31.63
100m Backstroke	Araya Wongvat; Thailand	1:05.18	Yessy Venisia Yosaputra; Indonesia	1:05.81	Patricia Yosita Hapsari; Indonesia	1:07.35
200m Backstroke	Yessy Venisia Yosaputra; Indonesia	2:19.81	Araya Wongvat; Thailand	2:23.19	Ariana Herranz; Philippines	2:26.78
50m Breaststroke	Erika Kong Chia Chia; Malaysia	32.87	Jenjira Srisaard; Thailand	33.15	Margareta Kretapradani; Indonesia	33.92
100m Breaststroke	Erika Kong Chia Chia; Malaysia	1:12.85	Pornsuda Viniyompong; Thailand	1:13.07	Chavunnooch Salubluek; Thailand	1:13.58
200m Breaststroke	Pornsuda Viniyompong; Thailand	2:36.11	Ressa Kania Dewi; Indonesia	2:39.39	Chavunnooch Salubluek; Thailand	2:39.67
50m Butterfly	Jenjira Srisaard; Thailand	27.24	Hannah Dato; Philippines	27.82	Amanda Lim; Singapore	28.11
100m Butterfly	Pattarawadee Kittiya; Thailand	1:01.50	Hannah Dato; Philippines	1:02.42	Supasuta Sounthornchote; Thailand	1:02.66
200m Butterfly	Pattarawadee Kittiya; Thailand	2:14.20	Raina Saumi Grahana Ramdhani; Indonesia	2:17.19	Hannah Dato; Philippines	2:17.48
200m Individual Medley	Ressa Kania Dewi; Indonesia	2:21.46	Hannah Dato; Philippines	2:22.32	Erika Kong Chia Chia; Malaysia	2:22.32
400m Individual Medley	Pattarawadee Kittiya; Thailand	4:56.25	Ressa Kania Dewi; Indonesia	4:58.72	Hannah Dato; Philippines	5:05.28
4 × 100 m Freestyle Relay	Thailand	3:54.66	Indonesia	3:55.82	Malaysia	4:02.67
4 × 200 m Freestyle Relay	Thailand	8:26.60	Indonesia	8:30.00	Malaysia	8:56.34
4 × 100 m Medley Relay	Thailand	4:22.12	Indonesia	4:25.03	Philippines	4:30.50

Preceded by Palembang	ASEAN University Games; Singapore; XVIII ASEAN University Games (2016)	Succeeded by Naypyidaw
