= 2010 ASEAN University Games =

Sports event in Chiang Mai, Thailand

XV ASEAN University Games
- Host city: Chiang Mai, Thailand
- Motto: We are one
- Nations: 11
- Athletes: 1064
- Events: 183 in 15 sports
- Opening: 15 December
- Closing: 23 December
- Opened by: Chinaworn Bunyakiart; Minister of Education of Thailand
- Torch lighter: Thanyaluck Chotipiboon
- Main venue: Maejo University Stadium
- Website: thai2010aug.com

The 2010 ASEAN University Games officially known as the 15th ASEAN University Games was a Southeast Asian university multi-sport event held in Chiang Mai, Thailand from 15 to 23 December 2010. Around 1064 athletes participated at the event, which featured 183 events in 15 sports.

== Development and preparation ==
The Organising Committee of the 15th ASEAN University Games was formed to oversee the staging of the games.

=== Venues ===
The 15th ASEAN University Games had 13 venues for the games.

City	Competition Venue	Sports
Chiang Mai
Chiang Mai	Maejo University
Chiang Mai	Gymnasium	Opening and closing ceremonies, Sepak takraw, Volleyball (Indoor)
Chiang Mai	Main stadium	Athletics, Football (finals)
Chiang Mai	Swimming Pool	Aquatics
Chiang Mai	Chiang Mai University
Chiang Mai	Gymnasium	Badminton, Table tennis
Chiang Mai	Beech Volleyball Court	Volleyball (Beech)
Chiang Mai	Chiang Mai Sports Complex
Chiang Mai	Gymnasium	Basketball, Futsal
Chiang Mai	Tennis center	Tennis
Chiang Mai	Others
Chiang Mai	Prince Royal College	Football
Chiang Mai	Montfort College	Football
Chiang Mai	Maejo Golf club and resort	Golf
Chiang Mai	UFO Bowl	Bowling
Chiang Mai	Payap University	Pencak Silat
Chiang Mai	North Chiang Mai University	Karate, Taekwondo

== Marketing ==
=== Logo ===
Nong Hug, the hill tribe youth, The official Mascot of the games.

The logo of the 2010 ASEAN University Games is a Galae, a traditional house constructed with Northern Lanna style intended to prevent bad things or bad luck from entering the houses. In the logo, the Galae symbol represents the good things and happiness brought to the host nation of the games and visitors and participants from all ASEAN nations.

=== Mascot ===
The official mascot of the 2010 ASEAN University Games is a hill tribe youth named Nong Hug. The name Hug was chosen for the mascot, because Hug means Love in Northern Thai language which is also the beginning of unity and harmony. In English, the word Hug defines as to embrace or hold one's arms to show the love shared and to hug each other. Nong is the Thai word for young man, or little brother. The combination of love and hug as shown in the red cloth wrapped around Nong Hug's waist represents the existence of love when being hug for not just people of the host country Thailand but also participating countries of the games from Southeast Asia.

== The games ==
=== Opening ceremony ===
The Games opening ceremony was held at the Maejo University gymnasium on 15 December 2010, 16:14 (TST). The ceremony began with the athletes from participating nations paraded into the university's gymnasium led by flag bearers. After that, the Thai National Anthem was played as the national flag of Thailand was raised by students from the military school. This was followed by a hill tribe dance performance to honor the country's King and Queen for aiding and providing the hill tribespeople services such as crop replacement and outlet for handicrafts, and the speeches from Chiang Mai Deputy Governor Naruemol Palwat, Secretary General of the Office Higher Education Commission and President of the Organizing Committee Dr. Sumet and President of the ASEAN University Sports Council, Honorable Dato Professor Omar Osman. Chinaworn Bunyakiart, the Minister of Education for Thailand later gave his speech as well and went on to declare the games opened by the ceremonial gong three times, symbolizing good luck, health and prosperity. After that, Nonthiya Jiewbangpa, the singer of the 1995 Southeast Asian Games theme song, sang the games theme song, "We are one", and the athlete and referee oath were taken. Then three athletes, 2 footballers from Maejo and a karate exponent from Rajaphat University carried in the torch into the stadium and pass it on to Chiang Mai University student Thanyaluck Chotipiboon who carried the torch to light a giant Yi Peng lantern cauldron to start the games. The ceremony concluded with a Lanna cultural dance performance.

=== Closing ceremony ===
The Ceremony was held at Maejo University Gymnasium on 23 December 2010 5 p.m. (TST). The ceremony began with the playing of Thai national anthem and the first dance performance by Maejo University students entitled "The Glory of the Land of Culture", represented the beauty of Thailand's regions, nature, tradition and culture. After that, the local girls carry the signs of the 11 participating nations and the signs of 15 sports. Speeches were given by Chiang Mai Governor ML Panadda Diskul, Dr. Sumate Yamnoon, President of the Organizing Committee and Hon. Dato’ Prof. Omar Osman, Chairman of the ASEAN University Sports Council. Deputy Education Minister Chaiyos gave his speech as well and went on to declare the games closed. The games flag was lowered and was passed on to Laos, host of the 2012 ASEAN University Games when Sengdeuane Lachathabun, Deputy Minister of Education received the flag from Dr Sumate Yamnoon, and the games Council Chairman Osman. A Lao cultural dance segment performance was shown by Lao dancers, to symbolise Laos as the next host country. The flame of the 2010 ASEAN University Games was put out during the performance of "Together as One" by the students of Sansai Withayakhom School and Ranard Khun Inn Symphony. The ceremony concluded with dance and sing section by athletes from the 11 participating nations.

=== Participating nations ===
- Brunei
- Cambodia
- Indonesia
- Laos
- Malaysia
- Myanmar
- Philippines
- Singapore
- Thailand
- East Timor
- Vietnam

=== Sports ===
- Athletics (42)
- Swimming (40)
- Badminton (7)
- Basketball (2)
- Bowling (10)
- Football (1)
- Futsal (1)
- Golf (4)
- Karate (17)
- Pencak silat (17)
- Sepak takraw (3)
- Taekwondo (21)
- Table tennis (7)
- Tennis (7)
- Volleyball (4)

=== Calendar ===
OC	Opening ceremony	●	Event competitions	1	Gold medal events	CC	Closing ceremony

December	14 Tue	15 Wed	16 Thu	17 Fri	18 Sat	19 Sun	20 Mon	21 Tue	22 Wed	23 Thu	Events
Ceremonies		OC								CC	—N/a
Aquatics					10		10	10	10		40
Athletics					9		12	10	11		42
Badminton		●	●	●	2		●	●	5		7
Basketball			●	●	●		●	●	2		2
Bowling				2	2		4	2			10
Football	●		●		●			●		1	1
Futsal			●	●	●		●		1		1
Golf							●	●	●	4	4
Karate			4	7	6						17
Pencak silat							●	4	13		17
Sepak takraw			●	1	●		1	●	1		3
Table tennis			●	●	2		●	1	4		7
Taekwondo							5	6	6	4	21
Tennis			●	●	2		●	3	2		7
Volleyball			●	●	●		●	1	3		4
Daily medal events			4	10	33	0	32	37	58	9	183
Cumulative total			4	14	47	47	79	116	174	183	183
December	14 Tue	15 Wed	16 Thu	17 Fri	18 Sat	19 Sun	20 Mon	21 Tue	22 Wed	23 Thu	Total events

- 19 December 2010 was a rest day for the games.

=== Medal table ===
* Host nation (Thailand)

Rank	Nation	Gold	Silver	Bronze	Total
1	Thailand (THA)*	58	61	50	169
2	Indonesia (INA)	46	51	50	147
3	Malaysia (MAS)	37	36	44	117
4	Vietnam (VIE)	34	16	14	64
5	Philippines (PHI)	5	4	24	33
6	Laos (LAO)	2	9	30	41
7	Singapore (SIN)	1	6	23	30
8	Brunei (BRU)	0	0	3	3
8	Timor-Leste (TLS)	0	0	3	3
10	Myanmar (MYA)	0	0	2	2
11	Cambodia (CAM)	0	0	0	0
Totals (11 entries)		183	183	243	609

Preceded by Kuala Lumpur	ASEAN University Games; Chiang Mai; XV ASEAN University Games (2010)	Succeeded by Vientiane
