= 2012 ASEAN University Games =

Sports event in Vientiane, Laos

XVI ASEAN University Games
- Host city: Vientiane, Laos
- Motto: We Are ASEAN Family
- Nations: 11
- Athletes: 1700
- Events: 240 in 17 sports
- Opening: 12 December
- Closing: 20 December
- Opened by: Thongsing Thammavong; Prime Minister of Laos
- Torch lighter: Vatsana Sijan and Saton Sutina
- Main venue: New Laos National Stadium
- Website: auglaos2012.com

The 2012 ASEAN University Games officially known as the 16th ASEAN University Games was a Southeast Asian university multi-sports event held in Vientiane, Laos. This was the first time Laos hosted the games. Laos is the eighth nation to host the ASEAN University Games after Thailand, Indonesia, Malaysia, Singapore, Brunei, Philippines and Vietnam.

The games was held from 12 to 20 December 2012, although several events had commenced from 11 December 2012. Around 1700 athletes participated at the event which featured 240 events in 17 sports. It was opened and closed by Thongsing Thammavong, the Prime Minister of Laos at the New Laos National Stadium.

The final medal tally was led by Malaysia, followed by Vietnam and Thailand with host Laos in fifth place.

== Development and preparation ==
The Organising Committee of the 16th ASEAN University Games was formed to oversee the staging of the games.

=== Venues ===
The 16th ASEAN University Games had 16 venues for the games.

City	Competition Venue	Sports
Vientiane
Vientiane	National Sport Complex
Vientiane	Main Stadium	Athletics, Football, Opening and closing ceremonies
Vientiane	Aquatic Center	Aquatics
Vientiane	Archery Field	Archery
Vientiane	Gymnasium I	Badminton
Vientiane	Tennis Court	Tennis
Vientiane	Gymnasium II	Indoor Volleyball
Vientiane	Beach Volleyball Stadium	Beach Volleyball
Vientiane	National University of Laos
Vientiane	National University Stadium	Football
Vientiane	Olympasia Gymnasium	Sepak Takraw
Vientiane	Convention Hall	Table Tennis
Vientiane	Booyong Gymnasium	Taekwondo, Pencak Silat
Vientiane	Petanque Court	Petanque
Vientiane	Others
Vientiane	Chao Anou Vong Stadium	Football
Vientiane	Gymnasium, Lao -Thai Beung Kha Nhong	Basketball, Muay
Vientiane	Chao Anou Vong, Gymnasium (Budo Centre)	Judo, Karate
Vientiane	Phonsawan School	Wushu

== Marketing ==
=== Logo ===
Mr. Santiphab and Miss Mittaphab, the bees, the official mascot of the games

The 2012 ASEAN University Games logo is a "Nark" or "Naga" a worshipped animal throughout the ASEAN nations. According to Laotian myths, "Nark" or "Naga" appeared 450 years ago in the Lao saga before the establishment of Vientiane in which it took its name "Vientiane Chanthabury Sisattanabhut". It is said to be an animal full of omnipotent power and it's believed to parry spirits and evilness. The "Naga" logo bears the Plumeria alba, commonly known as Frangipani and locally known as Dok Champa, the symbolic and national flower of Laos, symbolises Laos as the host nation of the games. Overall, the logo represents the ASEAN University Games aim of creating good will of spiritual solidarity, friendship and peace within the ASEAN community.

=== Mascot ===
The official mascot of the 2012 ASEAN University Games is a pair of bees named Mr. Santiphap and Miss Mittaphap. The adoption of the Bee as the games' mascot is to relate the bees who work together in solidarity, strength and efficiency to the savants and architectures of the ASEAN nations. The name of the male mascot, Mr. Santiphab (Mr. Peace) represents the Peace between the ASEAN nations whereas the name of the female mascot, Miss Mittaphab (Miss Friendship) represents the Friendship between the ASEAN nations.

=== Motto ===
The official motto of the games is "We Are ASEAN Family". It was chosen to highlight the unity of the ASEAN countries through sport as well as the purpose of ASEAN University Games in creating solidarity, friendship and peace within the ASEAN Community.

== The games ==
=== Opening ceremony ===
The opening ceremony was held on 12 December 2012 at 17:30 (LST) at the New Laos National Stadium. The opening ceremony begins with the parade of athletes from participating nations into the stadium. The Laos contingent was led by Sonexay Mangkhuela, the gold medalist of Taekwondo event at the 2011 Southeast Asian Games in Indonesia. This was followed by the speech of the minister of Sports and Education of Laos, Phankham Viphavanh, the declaration of the games' opening by Thongsing Thammovong, then Prime minister of Laos and the athlete and referee oath and the lighting of the games cauldron. The ceremony concludes with the song and dance performance by 1600 Laotian primary school students.

=== Closing ceremony ===
The closing ceremony was held on 20 December 2012 at 17:30 (LST) at the New Laos National Stadium in which Deputy Prime Minister of Laos, Mr Asang Laoly declared the Games closed.

=== Participating nations ===
- Brunei
- Cambodia
- Indonesia
- Laos
- Malaysia
- Myanmar
- Philippines
- Singapore
- Thailand
- East Timor
- Vietnam

=== Sports ===
The 2012 ASEAN University Games programme featured 334 events in 17 sports and disciplines. The number of events in each discipline is noted in parentheses.

- Athletics (38)
- Swimming (44)
- Archery (10)
- Badminton (7)
- Basketball (2)
- Football (2)
- Judo (16)
- Karate (17)
- Muay (13)
- Pencak silat (19)
- Petanque (11)
- Sepak takraw (6)
- Table tennis (7)
- Taekwondo (19)
- Tennis (7)
- Volleyball (4)
- Wushu (18)

=== Calendar ===
OC	Opening ceremony	●	Event competitions	1	Gold medal events	CC	Closing ceremony

December	11 Tue	12 Wed	13 Thu	14 Fri	15 Sat	16 Sun	17 Mon	18 Tue	19 Wed	20 Thu	Gold medal events
Ceremonies		OC								CC	N/A
Aquatics			1	2	1	12	8	10	10		44
Archery					●	●	4	4	2		10
Athletics					8	12	10	8			38
Badminton			●	●	2	●	●	●	5		7
Basketball			●	●	●	●	●		2		2
Football	●		●		●		●	1	1		2
Judo							4	7	5		16
Karate			8	7	2						17
Muay				●	●	6		7			13
Pencak silat							6	●	13		19
Petanque			●	3	●	3	2	●	2	1	11
Sepak takraw			●	2	●	2	●	2			6
Table tennis			●	●	2		●	1	4		7
Taekwondo			5	4	6	4					19
Tennis			●	●	2	●	●	●	5		7
Volleyball			●	●	●	●	●	●	4		4
Wushu						10	2	6			18
Daily medal events			14	18	23	49	36	46	53	1	240
Cumulative total			14	32	55	104	140	186	239	240	240
December	11 Tue	12 Wed	13 Thu	14 Fri	15 Sat	16 Sun	17 Mon	18 Tue	19 Wed	20 Thu	Gold medal events

=== Medal table ===
* Host nation (Laos)

Rank	Nation	Gold	Silver	Bronze	Total
1	Malaysia (MAS)	60	48	72	180
2	Vietnam (VIE)	56	35	28	119
3	Thailand (THA)	45	52	56	153
4	Indonesia (INA)	41	52	61	154
5	Laos (LAO)*	32	35	46	113
6	Singapore (SIN)	3	6	23	32
7	Philippines (PHI)	2	12	16	30
8	Myanmar (MYA)	1	0	2	3
9	Cambodia (CAM)	0	0	8	8
10	Brunei (BRU)	0	0	5	5
11	Timor-Leste (TLS)	0	0	3	3
Totals (11 entries)		240	240	320	800

Preceded by Chiang Mai	ASEAN University Games; Vientiane; XVI ASEAN University Games (2012)	Succeeded by Palembang
