= 2014 ASEAN University Games =

Sports event in Palembang, Indonesia

XVII ASEAN University Games
- Host city: Palembang, Indonesia
- Motto: ASEAN In Harmony
- Nations: 11
- Athletes: 1000
- Events: 497 in 18 sports
- Opening: 11 December
- Closing: 21 December
- Opened by: Jusuf Kalla; Vice President of Indonesia
- Main venue: Gelora Sriwijaya Stadium
- Website: 2014 ASEAN University Games

The 2014 ASEAN University Games, officially known as the 17th ASEAN University Games, was a Southeast Asian university multi-sport event held in Palembang, Indonesia from 11 to 21 December 2014.

It was the fourth time Indonesia hosted the games and its first time since 2004. Previously, Indonesia also hosted the 1982 games and the 1990 games. Around 1000 athletes from 11 participating nations participated at the games which featured 226 events in 18 sports. Palembang is the fourth Indonesian city to host the ASEAN University Games after Jakarta in 1982, Bandung in 1990 and Surabaya in 2004. The games was opened by Jusuf Kalla, the vice-president of Indonesia at the Gelora Sriwijaya Stadium.

The final medal tally was led by host Indonesia, followed by Thailand and Malaysia. Several games records were broken during the games. The games were deemed generally successful, with the rising standard of university sports competition among the Southeast Asian nations.

== Development and preparation ==
The Organising committee of the 17th ASEAN University Games was formed to oversee the staging of the games.

=== Venues ===
The 17th ASEAN University Games had 16 venues for the games.

City	Competition Venue	Sports
Palembang	Gelora Sriwijaya Stadium	Opening and closing ceremony, Athletics, Football
Palembang	Jakabaring Aquatic Centre	Aquatics (Swimming, Diving)
Palembang	Jakabaring Archery Field	Archery
Palembang	GOR Dempo Jakabaring	Badminton
Palembang	GOR PSCC Palembang	Basketball, Volleyball (Indoor)
Palembang	Jakabaring Beach Volley Arena	Volleyball (Beech)
Palembang	Sriwijaya Promotion Centre	Fencing, Taekwondo
Palembang	Bumi Sriwijaya Stadium	Football
Palembang	GOR Ranau Jakabaring	Sepak takraw, Wushu
Palembang	OPI Jakabaring	Futsal
Palembang	Jakabaring multi-purpose hall	Karate, Pencak silat
Palembang	Jakabaring Petanque Field	Petanque
Palembang	Unsri Bukit hall	Table tennis
Palembang	Jakabaring Tennis Court	Tennis
Palembang	Bank Sumsel Babel	Chess

== Marketing ==
=== Motto ===
The official motto for the 2014 ASEAN University Games is ASEAN in harmony. It was chosen to highlight the games organiser's commitment in instilling Friendship and harmony among the youths of Southeast Asia.

=== Logo ===
The logo of the 2014 ASEAN University Games is an image of Palembang's landmark, the Ampera Bridge a vertical lift bridge that connects Seberang Ulu and Seberang Ilir, two regions of Palembang and Bidar, a boat of the South Sumatra Province. The Bidar boat represents Palembang, while the Ampera Bridge represents the connection between and the unity of the youths of ASEAN and the countries in Southeast Asia. The chain symbolises the close friendship between the countries and participants involved in the events, while the gold colour of the chain symbolises the achievement of the objectives of the participants.

=== Mascot ===
The mascot of the 2014 ASEAN University Games is a pair of male and female Sumatran elephants, namely Bonna and Bonni respectively. The adoption of the Sumatran elephant pair as the games mascot is to represent harmony among the Southeast Asian countries. Both the mascots wear Palembang traditional clothes with songket design which represents Palembang as the host of the games.

== The games ==
=== Opening ceremony ===
The opening ceremony was held at 19:00 on 11 December 2014 at the Gelora Sriwijaya Stadium. The games was opened by Jusuf Kalla, the vice-president of Indonesia.

=== Closing ceremony ===
The closing ceremony was held at 19:00 on 22 December 2014 at the Gelora Sriwijaya Stadium. The games was closed by Imam Nahrawi, the minister of youth and sports of Indonesia and the ASEAN University Games responsibility was officially handed over to Singapore, host of the 2016 ASEAN University Games.

=== Participating nations ===
- Brunei
- Cambodia
- Indonesia
- Laos
- Malaysia
- Myanmar
- Philippines
- Singapore
- Thailand
- Timor-Leste
- Vietnam

=== Sports ===
The 2014 ASEAN University Games programme featured 497 events in 18 sports and disciplines. The number of events in each discipline is noted in parentheses.

- Aquatics
  - Swimming (36)
  - Diving (8)
- Archery (10)
- Athletics (38)
- Badminton (7)
- Basketball (2)
- Chess (4)
- Fencing (12)
- Football (1)
- Futsal (2)
- Karate (17)
- Pencak silat (20)
- Petanque (5)
- Sepak takraw (6)
- Table tennis (7)
- Taekwondo (21)
- Tennis (7)
- Volleyball (4)
- Wushu (19)

=== Medal table ===
A total of 1514 medals comprising 504 Gold medals, 503 Silver medals and 507 Bronze medals were awarded to athletes. The host Indonesia' performance was its best ever yet and emerged as overall champion of the games.

* Host nation (Indonesia)

Rank	Nation	Gold	Silver	Bronze	Total
1	Indonesia (INA)*	66	78	46	190
2	Thailand (THA)	53	34	27	114
3	Malaysia (MAS)	40	42	29	111
4	Vietnam (VIE)	27	15	4	46
5	Philippines (PHI)	10	11	21	42
6	Laos (LAO)	7	6	13	26
7	Singapore (SIN)	4	7	13	24
8	Myanmar (MYA)	0	3	7	10
9	Cambodia (CAM)	0	3	0	3
10	Brunei (BRU)	0	0	1	1
10	Timor-Leste (TLS)	0	0	1	1
Totals (11 entries)		207	199	162	568

Preceded by Vientiane	ASEAN University Games; Palembang; XVII ASEAN University Games (2014)	Succeeded by Singapore
