= ASEAN University Games =

Multi-sport event

- Abbreviation: AUG
- Frequency: Every 2 years
- Inaugurated: 1981 Chiang Mai, Thailand
- Most recent: 2024 Surabaya and Malang, Indonesia
- Next event: 2026 Kuala Lumpur, Malaysia

ASEAN University Sports Council (AUSC)
- Formation: 1980
- Type: Sports federation
- Headquarters: Kuala Lumpur, Malaysia
- Members: 11 countries
- Official language: English
- Website: ausc.my

ASEAN University Games (AUG) is a biennial sports event that involves athletes from the universities of the ASEAN member countries. It is regulated by ASEAN University Sports Council (AUSC) which was established in 1980.

== Sports ==
- Athletics
- Basketball
- Badminton
- Football
- Petanque
- Pencak silat
- Sepak takraw
- Shooting
- Swimming
- Table tennis
- Tennis
- Taekwondo
- Volleyball
- Rugby sevens
- Archery
- Beach volleyball
- Bowling
- Chess
- Chinlone
- Diving
- Field hockey
- Futsal
- Golf
- Judo
- Lawn bowls
- Netball
- Squash
- Vovinam
- Wushu

== Participating nations ==
- Brunei
- Cambodia
- Indonesia
- Laos
- Malaysia
- Myanmar
- Philippines
- Singapore
- Thailand
- Timor-Leste
- Vietnam

== List of ASEAN University Games ==
Location of the ASEAN University Games host

Edition	Year	Host city	Host country	Date	Sports	Events	Nations	Top ranked team	Ref
I	1981	Chiang Mai	Thailand		4			Indonesia	
II	1982	Jakarta	Indonesia					Indonesia	
III	1984	Bangi	Malaysia	10–17 November 1984	6		6	Indonesia	
IV	1986	Singapore	Singapore					Indonesia	
V	1988	Pattaya	Thailand					Thailand	
VI	1990	Bandung	Indonesia					Indonesia	
VII	1993	Shah Alam	Malaysia					Indonesia	
VIII	1994	Singapore	Singapore	19–25 June 1994	8		6	Indonesia	
IX	1996	Bandar Seri Begawan	Brunei					Indonesia	
X	1999	Bangkok	Thailand			79	9	Thailand	
XI	2002	Manila	Philippines	19–24 January 2002	8			Thailand	
XII	2004	Surabaya	Indonesia	5–12 December 2004	10	112	10	Thailand	
XIII	2006	Hanoi	Vietnam	16–22 December 2006	12	157	9	Vietnam	
XIV	2008	Kuala Lumpur	Malaysia	11–21 December 2008	21	219	10	Malaysia	
XV	2010	Chiang Mai	Thailand	15–23 December 2010	15	183	11	Thailand	
XVI	2012	Vientiane	Laos	12–20 December 2012	17	240	11	Malaysia	
XVII	2014	Palembang	Indonesia	11–21 December 2014	18	208	11	Indonesia	
XVIII	2016	Singapore	Singapore	10–19 July 2016	15	173	11	Thailand	
XIX	2018	Naypyidaw	Myanmar	10–19 December 2018	17	203	11	Thailand	
XX	2022	Ubon Ratchathani	Thailand	26 July–6 August 2022^{[a]}	23	236	11	Thailand	
XXI	2024	Surabaya–Malang	Indonesia	25 June–6 July 2024	21	250	11	Indonesia	
XXII	2026	Kuala Lumpur	Malaysia	10–19 December 2026	19	193	11		
XXIII	2028	Phnom Penh	Cambodia	May 2028					

Note
^[a] Originally scheduled for 13–22 December 2020, previously postponed to 18–27 June 2021, 22–30 June 2022 and finally to 26 July - 6 August 2022.
