= 1969 Asian Badminton Championships – Men's team =

Badminton championship in Manila, Philippines

Men's team at the 1969 Asian Badminton Championships
- Venue: Rizal Memorial Coliseum
- Location: Manila, Philippines
- Dates: 3 – 8 February 1969

The men's team tournament at the 1969 Asian Badminton Championships, also known as the Tunku Abdul Rahman Cup (Malay: Piala Tunku Abdul Rahman) took place from 3 to 8 February 1969 at the Rizal Memorial Coliseum in Manila, Philippines. A total of 14 teams competed in this event.

== Results ==
=== Bracket ===
Round of 16
Indonesia	5
Ceylon	0
Philippines	5
South Vietnam	0
Laos	w/o
South Korea
Burma	3
Taiwan	2
Japan	3
Pakistan	2
Hong Kong	2
India	3

Quarter-finals
Indonesia	3
Thailand	2
Philippines	3
Laos	2
Malaysia	3
Burma	2
Japan	3
India	2

Semi-finals
Indonesia	3
Philippines	2
Malaysia	3
Japan	2

Final
Indonesia	3
Malaysia	2
Third place
Philippines	2
Japan	3

=== Round of 16 ===
Japan
3
Rizal Memorial Coliseum
3 February 1969

Pakistan
2

			1	2	3
1	(Japan) (Pakistan)	Ippei Kojima; Fazal Haq	15; 1	15; 1
2	(Japan) (Pakistan)	Yukinori Hori; Khawaja Salahuddin	3; 15	12; 15
3	(Japan) (Pakistan)	Yukinori Hori / Ippei Kojima; Naqi Mohsin / Khawaja Salahuddin	15; 6	15; 5
4	(Japan) (Pakistan)	Yukinori Hori; Fazal Haq	15; 8	15; 6
5	(Japan) (Pakistan)	Ippei Kojima; Khawaja Salahuddin				w/o

Taiwan
2
Rizal Memorial Coliseum
3 February 1969

Burma
3

			1	2	3
1	(Taiwan) (Myanmar)	Ho Wen-ming; Kyi Nyunt	9; 15	4; 15
2	(Taiwan) (Myanmar)	Huang Liang-en; San Myint	15; 11	5; 15	10; 15
3	(Taiwan) (Myanmar)	Eow Ching-lee / Huang Liang-en; Kyi Nyunt / Wai Nyunt	15; 11	6; 15	15; 6
4	(Taiwan) (Myanmar)	Ho Wen-ming; San Myint	5; 15	6; 15
5	(Taiwan) (Myanmar)	Huang Liang-en; Kyi Nyunt				w/o

Philippines
5
Rizal Memorial Coliseum
3 February 1969

South Vietnam
0

			1	2	3
1	(Philippines) (South Vietnam)	Daniel So; Lâm Trình	15; 12	15; 5
2	(Philippines) (South Vietnam)	Conrado Co; Âu Đức Minh	15; 4	15; 3
3	(Philippines) (South Vietnam)	Armando Yanga / Oscar Yanga; Âu Đức Minh / Lâm Trình	8; 15	15; 5	15; 9
4	(Philippines) (South Vietnam)	Daniel So; Âu Đức Minh				w/o
5	(Philippines) (South Vietnam)	Conrado Co; Lâm Trình				w/o

Indonesia
5
Rizal Memorial Coliseum
3 February 1969

Ceylon
0

			1	2	3
1	(Indonesia) (Dominion of Ceylon)	Darmadi; L. R. Ariyananda	15; 1	15; 1
2	(Indonesia) (Dominion of Ceylon)	Muljadi; Gerry Chandrasena	15; 1	15; 0
3	(Indonesia) (Dominion of Ceylon)	Indratno / Mintarja; Gerry Chandrasena / Sam Chandrasena	15; 1	15; 1
4	(Indonesia) (Dominion of Ceylon)	Darmadi; Gerry Chandrasena				w/o
5	(Indonesia) (Dominion of Ceylon)	Muljadi; L. R. Ariyananda				w/o

India
5
Rizal Memorial Coliseum
3 February 1969

Hong Kong
0

			1	2	3
1	(India) (Hong Kong)	Dinesh Khanna; Tsoi Fai	15; 2	15; 5
2	(India) (Hong Kong)	Satish Bhatia; Koo Man For	15; 2	15; 2
3	(India) (Hong Kong)	Satish Bhatia / Raman Ghosh; Koo Man For / Tsoi Fai	15; 8	15; 2
4	(India) (Hong Kong)	Dinesh Khanna; Koo Man For				w/o
5	(India) (Hong Kong)	Satish Bhatia; Tsoi Fai				w/o

=== Quarter-finals ===
Indonesia
3
Rizal Memorial Coliseum
6 February 1969

Thailand
2

			1	2	3
1	(Indonesia) (Thailand)	Darmadi; Sangob Rattanusorn	8; 15	15; 7	10; 7	retired
2	(Indonesia) (Thailand)	Muljadi; Somsook Boonyasukhanonda	10; 15	15; 8	15; 7
3	(Indonesia) (Thailand)	Indratno / Mintarja; Chavalert Chumkum / Raphi Kanchanaraphi	15; 1	15; 8
4	(Indonesia) (Thailand)	Darmadi; Somsook Boonyasukhanonda				w/o
5	(Indonesia) (Thailand)	Muljadi; Sangob Rattanusorn				w/o

Philippines
3
Rizal Memorial Coliseum
6 February 1969

Laos
2

			1	2	3
1	(Philippines) (Laos)	Daniel So; Champadeng Outhabong	15; 5	10; 15	15; 4
2	(Philippines) (Laos)	Conrado Co; Somsack Thao	15; 6	15; 6
3	(Philippines) (Laos)	Armando Yanga / Oscar Yanga; Champadeng Outhabong / Somsack Thao	15; 9	5; 15	8; 15
4	(Philippines) (Laos)	Conrado Co; Champadeng Outhabong	15; 4	15; 7
5	(Philippines) (Laos)	Daniel So; Somsack Thao				w/o

Malaysia
3
Rizal Memorial Coliseum
6 February 1969

Burma
2

			1	2	3
1	(Malaysia) (Myanmar)	Tan Aik Huang; San Myint	15; 2	15; 7
2	(Malaysia) (Myanmar)	Tan Aik Mong; Kyi Nyunt	9; 15	15; 11	15; 5
3	(Malaysia) (Myanmar)	Ng Boon Bee / Punch Gunalan; Kyi Nyunt / Wai Nyunt	15; 8	15; 4
4	(Malaysia) (Myanmar)	Tan Aik Huang; Kyi Nyunt				w/o
5	(Malaysia) (Myanmar)	Tan Aik Mong; San Myint				w/o

India
2
Rizal Memorial Coliseum
6 February 1969

Japan
3

			1	2	3
1	(India) (Japan)	Satish Bhatia; Ippei Kojima	5; 15	4; 15
2	(India) (Japan)	Dinesh Khanna; Yukinori Hori	15; 11	15; 4
3	(India) (Japan)	Satish Bhatia / Raman Ghosh; Yukinori Hori / Ippei Kojima	15; 8	4; 15	15; 17
4	(India) (Japan)	Dinesh Khanna; Ippei Kojima	15; 9	15; 7
5	(India) (Japan)	Satish Bhatia; Yukinori Hori	6; 15	15; 12	14; 17

=== Semi-finals ===
Indonesia
3
Rizal Memorial Coliseum
7 February 1969

Philippines
2

			1	2	3
1	(Indonesia) (Philippines)	Darmadi; James Lim	15; 2	15; 1
2	(Indonesia) (Philippines)	Muljadi; Daniel So	15; 10	15; 9
3	(Indonesia) (Philippines)	Indratno / Mintarja; Conrado Co / Armando Yanga	18; 13	15; 10
4	(Indonesia) (Philippines)	Darmadi; Daniel So				w/o
5	(Indonesia) (Philippines)	Muljadi; James Lim				w/o

Malaysia
3
Rizal Memorial Coliseum
7 February 1969

Japan
2

			1	2	3
1	(Malaysia) (Japan)	Tan Aik Huang; Ippei Kojima	15; 12	15; 7
2	(Malaysia) (Japan)	Tan Aik Mong; Yukinori Hori	15; 11	15; 1
3	(Malaysia) (Japan)	Ng Boon Bee / Punch Gunalan; Ippei Kojima / Yukinori Hori	15; 1	15; 7
4	(Malaysia) (Japan)	Tan Aik Huang; Yukinori Hori				w/o
5	(Malaysia) (Japan)	Tan Aik Mong; Ippei Kojima				w/o

=== Third place ===
Japan
3
Rizal Memorial Coliseum
8 February 1969

Philippines
2

			1	2	3
1	(Japan) (Philippines)	Ippei Kojima; Daniel So	15; 5	15; 2
2	(Japan) (Philippines)	Yukinori Hori; Conrado Co	15; 3	15; 7
3	(Japan) (Philippines)	Yukinori Hori / Ippei Kojima; Conrado Co / Armando Yanga	15; 10	15; 11
4	(Japan) (Philippines)	Yukinori Hori; Daniel So				w/o
5	(Japan) (Philippines)	Ippei Kojima; Conrado Co				w/o

=== Final ===
Malaysia
2
Rizal Memorial Coliseum
8 February 1969

Indonesia
3

			1	2	3
1	(Malaysia) (Indonesia)	Tan Aik Huang; Darmadi	6; 15	3; 15
2	(Malaysia) (Indonesia)	Tan Aik Mong; Muljadi	15; 18	10; 15
3	(Malaysia) (Indonesia)	Ng Boon Bee / Punch Gunalan; Indratno / Mintarja	15; 8	15; 6
4	(Malaysia) (Indonesia)	Tan Aik Mong; Darmadi	8; 15	15; 3	15; 3
5	(Malaysia) (Indonesia)	Tan Aik Huang; Muljadi	8; 15	7; 15
