= Vietnam national badminton team =

Vietnamese national badminton team

Vietnam
- Association: Vietnam Badminton Federation (VBF)
- Confederation: BA (Asia)
- President: Lê Đăng Xu

BWF ranking
- Current ranking: 44 ▼ (2 January 2024)
- Highest ranking: 15 (6 July 2017)

Sudirman Cup
- Appearances: 5 (first in 2011)
- Best result: Group stage (2011, 2013, 2015, 2017, 2019)

Asian Mixed Team Championships
- Appearances: 1 (first in 2017)
- Best result: Group stage (2017)

Asian Men's Team Championships
- Appearances: 5 (first in 2004)
- Best result: Quarter-finals (2008)

Asian Women's Team Championships
- Appearances: 4 (first in 2004)
- Best result: Group stage

The Vietnam national badminton team (Vietnamese: Đội tuyển cầu lông Việt Nam) represents Vietnam in international badminton team competitions. The national team is controlled by the Vietnam Badminton Federation, the governing body for badminton in Vietnam. The Vietnamese team competes in the biennial Southeast Asian Games and have made several achievements in badminton at the games.

== History ==
The Vietnamese badminton team was formed following the establishment of the Vietnam Badminton Federation in 1958. In the 1960s, sports clubs in Hanoi and Saigon (now Ho Chi Minh City) began to play the sport and started to spread its popularity across the North and the South. The team have never qualified for the Thomas Cup and Uber Cup. Nguyễn Tiến Minh won Vietnam's first World Championship medal at the 2013 BWF World Championships.

=== Men's team ===
The Vietnamese men's team first competed in the 1995 Southeast Asian Games. The team have lost in the quarterfinals until 2005 when the team defeat Singapore 3–2 to enter the semi-finals for a guaranteed bronze. The team won when scratch pair Nguyễn Quang Minh and Nguyễn Hoàng Hải defeat Khoo Kian Teck and Alvin Fu to deliver the winning point for Vietnam.

Vietnam competed in the 2023 SEA Games men's team event. The team put in their best efforts against the Malaysian team. Lê Đức Phát earned the team's first point when he defeated Lee Shun Yang, whom he previously lost to in the 2021 Southeast Asian Games. The team failed to convert and lost 3–1 in the quarter-final stage.

=== Women's team ===
The Vietnamese women's team debuted at the 1995 Southeast Asian Games. The team then reached the semi-finals at the 1999 Southeast Asian Games but lost to Indonesia 5–0. They reached the semi-finals again in 2001 but lost to Thailand 3–0. At the 2003 Southeast Asian Games, the women's team reached their third consecutive semi-final by beating the Philippines 3–2 in the quarter-finals.

In 2018, the Vietnamese women's team made their first appearance at the Badminton Asia Team Championships. The team lost to Thailand and Malaysia but won against the Philippines in the group stage. In 2021, the Vietnamese women's team made history by beating Malaysia for the first time to enter the semi-finals at the 2021 Southeast Asian Games. In 2023, the Vietnamese women's team competed in the 2023 SEA Games women's team event and lost 3–0 to Singapore.

=== Mixed team ===
The Vietnamese mixed team made their debut in the 2011 Sudirman Cup. The team were drawn to classification Group 3B and won all their matches against Bulgaria and South Africa but lost to Sweden to finish in 23rd place. In 2017, the team debuted at the Badminton Asia Mixed Team Championships as host nation. They were eliminated in the group stages. In that same year, the team participated in the 2017 Sudirman Cup. They were drawn into classification Group 2A with Scotland, New Zealand and Canada. The team reached a new high when they topped their group and defeated Singapore 3–1 to finish in 13th place.

== Competitive record ==
=== Thomas Cup ===
Year	Round	Pos
1949	See South Vietnam	
1952	See South Vietnam	
1955	See South Vietnam	
1958	See South Vietnam	
1961	See South Vietnam	
1964	See South Vietnam	
1967	See South Vietnam	
1970	See South Vietnam	
1973	See South Vietnam	
1976	Did not enter	
1979	Did not enter	
1982	Did not enter	
1984	Did not enter	
1986	Did not enter	
1988	Did not enter	
1990	Did not enter	
1992	Did not enter	
1994	Did not enter	
1996	Did not enter	
1998	Did not enter	
2000	Did not enter	
2002	Did not enter	
2004	Did not qualify	
2006	Did not qualify	
2008	Did not qualify	
2010	Did not qualify	
2012	Did not qualify	
2014	Did not qualify	
2016	Did not enter	
2018	Did not enter	
2020	Did not enter	
2022	Did not enter	
2024	Did not enter	
2026	TBD	
2028	TBD	
2030	TBD	

=== Uber Cup ===
Year	Round	Pos
1957	See South Vietnam	
1960	See South Vietnam	
1963	See South Vietnam	
1966	See South Vietnam	
1969	See South Vietnam	
1972	See South Vietnam	
1975	Did not enter	
1978	Did not enter	
1981	Did not enter	
1984	Did not enter	
1986	Did not enter	
1988	Did not enter	
1990	Did not enter	
1992	Did not enter	
1994	Did not enter	
1996	Did not enter	
1998	Did not enter	
2000	Did not enter	
2002	Did not enter	
2004	Did not qualify	
2006	Did not enter	
2008	Did not qualify	
2010	Did not enter	
2012	Did not qualify	
2014	Did not qualify	
2016	Did not enter	
2018	Did not qualify	
2020	Did not enter	
2022	Did not enter	
2024	TBD	
2026	TBD	
2028	TBD	
2030	TBD	

=== Sudirman Cup ===
Year	Round	Pos
1989	Did not enter	
1991	Did not enter	
1993	Did not enter	
1995	Did not enter	
1997	Did not enter	
1999	Did not enter	
2001	Did not enter	
2003	Did not enter	
2005	Did not enter	
2007	Did not enter	
2009	Did not enter	
2011	Group stage	23rd
2013	Group stage	21st
2015	Group stage	21st
2017	Group stage	13th
2019	Group stage	18th
2021	Did not enter	
2023	Did not enter	
2025	TBD	
2027	TBD	
2029	TBD	

=== Asian Games ===
==== Men's team ====
Year	Round	Pos
1962	See South Vietnam	
1966	See South Vietnam	
1970	See South Vietnam	
1974	See South Vietnam	
1978	Did not enter	
1982	Did not enter	
1986	Did not enter	
1990	Did not enter	
1994	Did not enter	
1998	Did not enter	
2002	Did not enter	
2006	Group stage	7th
2010	Did not enter	
2014	Did not enter	
2018	Did not enter	
2022	Did not enter	
2026	TBD	
2030	TBD	
2034	TBD	
2038	TBD	

==== Women's team ====
Year	Round	Pos
1962	See South Vietnam	
1966	See South Vietnam	
1970	See South Vietnam	
1974	See South Vietnam	
1978	Did not enter	
1982	Did not enter	
1986	Did not enter	
1990	Did not enter	
1994	Did not enter	
1998	Did not enter	
2002	Did not enter	
2006	Did not enter	
2010	Did not enter	
2014	Did not enter	
2018	Did not enter	
2022	Did not enter	
2026	TBD	
2030	TBD	
2034	TBD	
2038	TBD	

=== Asian Team Championships ===
==== Men's team ====
Year	Round	Pos
1962	See South Vietnam	
1965	See South Vietnam	
1969	See South Vietnam	
1971	See South Vietnam	
1976	Did not enter	
1983	Did not enter	
1985	Did not enter	
1987	Did not enter	
1989	Did not enter	
1993	Did not enter	
2004	Group stage	11th
2006	Group stage	12th
2008	Group stage	11th
2010	Quarter-finals	8th
2012	Group stage	12th
2016	Did not enter	
2018	Did not enter	
2020	Did not enter	
2022	Did not enter	
2024	Did not enter	
2026	TBD	
2028	TBD	
2030	TBD	

==== Women's team ====
Year	Round	Pos
2004	Group stage	9th
2006	Did not enter	
2008	Group stage	9th
2010	Did not enter	
2012	Group stage	11th
2016	Did not enter	
2018	Group stage	9th
2020	Did not enter	
2022	Did not enter	
2024	TBD	
2026	TBD	
2028	TBD	
2030	TBD	

==== Mixed team ====
Year	Round	Pos
2017	Group stage	9th
2019	Did not enter	
2023	Did not enter	
2025	TBD	
2027	TBD	
2029	TBD	

=== SEA Games ===
==== Men's team ====
Year	Round	Pos
1965	See South Vietnam	
1971	See South Vietnam	
1973	See South Vietnam	
1975	Did not enter	
1977	Did not enter	
1979	Did not enter	
1981	Did not enter	
1983	Did not enter	
1985	Did not enter	
1987	Did not enter	
1989	Did not enter	
1991	Did not enter	
1993	Did not enter	
1995	Did not enter	
1997	Quarter-finals	7th
1999	Quarter-finals	6th
2001	Quarter-finals	6th
2003	Quarter-finals	5th
2005	Semi-finals	4th
2007	Quarter-finals	5th
2009	Quarter-finals	5th
2011	Quarter-finals	6th
2015	Quarter-finals	5th
2017	Quarter-finals	6th
2019	Did not enter	
2021	Quarter-finals	5th
2023	Quarter-finals	6th
2025	Did not enter	
2027	TBD	
2029	TBD	
2031	TBD	
2033	TBD	

==== Women's team ====
Year	Round	Pos
1965	See South Vietnam	
1971	See South Vietnam	
1973	See South Vietnam	
1975	Did not enter	
1977	Did not enter	
1979	Did not enter	
1981	Did not enter	
1983	Did not enter	
1985	Did not enter	
1987	Did not enter	
1989	Did not enter	
1991	Did not enter	
1993	Did not enter	
1995	Did not enter	
1997	Quarter-finals	6th
1999	Semi-finals	4th
2001	Semi-finals	4th
2003	Semi-finals	4th
2005	Quarter-finals	5th
2007	Quarter-finals	6th
2009	Did not enter	
2011	Quarter-finals	6th
2015	Quarter-finals	5th
2017	Quarter-finals	5th
2019	Quarter-finals	6th
2021	Semi-finals	3rd
2023	Quarter-finals	5th
2025	Quarter-finals	
2027	TBD	
2029	TBD	
2031	TBD	
2033	TBD	

==== Mixed team ====
Year	Round	Pos
2023	Ineligible (Note: In the 2023 SEA Games mixed team event, Indonesia, Malaysia, Thailand, Vietnam, Singapore and the Philippines were all restricted from entering the competition.)	

=== FISU World University Games ===
==== Mixed team ====
Year	Round	Pos
2007	Did not enter	
2011	Did not enter	
2013	Did not enter	
2015	Did not enter	
2017	Did not enter	
2021	Did not enter	
2025	Did not enter	

=== World University Team Championships ===
==== Mixed team ====
Year	Round	Pos
2008	Did not enter	
2010	Did not enter	
2012	Did not enter	
2014	Did not enter	
2016	Did not enter	
2018	Did not enter	

=== ASEAN University Games ===
==== Men's team ====
Year	Round	Pos
2004	Did not enter	
2006	Group stage	6th
2008	Did not enter	
2010	Did not enter	
2012	Did not enter	
2014	Did not enter	
2016	Did not enter	
2018	Did not enter	
2022	Did not enter	
2024	TBD	

==== Women's team ====
Year	Round	Pos
2004	Did not enter	
2006	Group stage	6th
2008	Did not enter	
2010	Did not enter	
2012	Did not enter	
2014	Did not enter	
2016	Did not enter	
2018	Did not enter	
2022	Did not enter	
2024	TBD	

**Red border color indicates tournament was held on home soil.

== Junior competitive record ==
=== Suhandinata Cup ===
Year	Round	Pos
2000	Did not enter	
2002	Did not enter	
2004	Did not enter	
2006	Group stage	19th
2007	Group stage	18th
2008	Did not enter	
2009	Group stage	13th
2010	Did not enter	
2011	Did not enter	
2012	Group stage	14th
2013	Quarter-finals	8th
2014	Group stage	12th
2015	Did not enter	
2016	Did not enter	
2017	Did not enter	
2018	Did not enter	
2019	Did not enter	
2020	Cancelled because of COVID-19 pandemic	
2021	Cancelled because of COVID-19 pandemic	
2022	Did not enter	
2023	Did not enter	
2024	Group stage	17th
2025	Group stage	18th of 36

=== Asian Junior Team Championships ===
==== Boys' team ====
Year	Round	Pos
1997	Round of 16	10th
1998	Round of 16	10th
1999	Did not enter	
2000	Did not enter	
2001	Round of 16	11th
2002	Did not enter	
2004	Round of 16	10th
2005	Round of 16	10th

==== Girls' team ====
Year	Round	Pos
1997	Did not enter	
1998	Did not enter	
1999	Did not enter	
2000	Did not enter	
2001	Round of 16	9th
2002	Did not enter	
2004	Round of 16	9th
2005	Round of 16	9th

==== Mixed team ====
Year	Round	Pos
2006	Group stage	11th
2007	Group stage	10th
2008	Group stage	10th
2009	Group stage	9th
2010	Group stage	9th
2011	Group stage	11th
2012	Group stage	12th
2013	Group stage	11th
2014	Did not enter	
2015	Group stage	10th
2016	Group stage	13th
2017	Group stage	10th
2018	Did not enter	
2019	Did not enter	
2023	Group stage	12th
2024	Group stage	9th
2025	Group stage	16th
2026	Did not enter	

=== ASEAN School Games ===
==== Boys' team ====
Year	Round	Pos
2009	Fourth place	4th
2010	Group stage	5th
2011	Group stage	5th
2012	Group stage	5th
2013	Group stage	5th
2014	Semi-finals	4th
2015	Group stage	5th
2016	Did not enter	
2017	Did not enter	
2018	Did not enter	
2019	Did not enter	
2024	Champions	1st

==== Girls' team ====
Year	Round	Pos
2009	Fourth place	4th
2010	Group stage	5th
2011	Group stage	5th
2012	Group stage	5th
2013	Group stage	5th
2014	Did not enter	
2015	Did not enter	
2016	Did not enter	
2017	Did not enter	
2018	Did not enter	
2019	Did not enter	
2024	Semi-finals	4th

**Red border color indicates tournament was held on home soil.

== Staff ==
The following list shows the coaching staff for the national badminton team of Vietnam.

Name	Role
(Vietnam) Ngô Trung Dũng	Coach
(Vietnam) Trần Đức Dương	Coach
(Indonesia) Hariawan Hong	Coach

== Players ==
=== Current squad ===
As of 2 January 2024

==== Men's team ====
Name	DoB/Age	Ranking of event		
Name	DoB/Age	MS	MD	XD
Lê Đức Phát	1 February 1998 (age 28)	83	–	–
Nguyễn Hải Đăng	24 September 2000 (age 25)	99	–	–
Phan Phúc Thịnh	7 April 2003 (age 23)	438	–	–
Nguyễn Tiên Tuấn	25 February 2002 (age 24)	465	338	–
Nguyễn Chí Đức	27 January 2001 (age 25)	–	338	–
Trần Quốc Khánh	22 July 2006 (age 19)	679	350	–
Nguyễn Đinh Hoàng	4 March 2003 (age 23)	–	149	740
Trần Đinh Mạnh	23 May 2003 (age 23)	–	149	369
Phạm Văn Hải	3 January 2001 (age 25)	–	350	113
Nguyễn Hoàng Thiên Bảo	1 January 2010 (age 16)	–	937	–

==== Women's team ====
Name	DoB/Age	Ranking of event		
Name	DoB/Age	WS	WD	XD
Nguyễn Thùy Linh	20 November 1997 (age 28)	21	–	–
Vũ Thị Trang	19 May 1992 (age 34)	196	351	–
Vũ Thị Anh Thư	16 July 2001 (age 24)	114	–	–
Trần Thị Phương Thúy	8 October 2000 (age 25)	538	–	–
Nguyễn Thị Ngọc Lan	23 February 2002 (age 24)	–	309	1021
Thân Vân Anh	1 March 2003 (age 23)	–	309	113
Phạm Thị Diệu Ly	16 June 2002 (age 24)	484	274	1021
Phạm Thị Khánh	12 April 1999 (age 27)	–	274	369
Huỳnh Khánh My	11 June 2006 (age 20)	823	343	1284
Lê Thị Ngọc Hân	5 September 2011 (age 14)	298	343	–

=== Previous squads ===
- Sudirman Cup (2015, 2017, 2019)

== See also ==
- South Vietnam national badminton team
- Sport in Vietnam
