= South Vietnam national badminton team =

Former national badminton team representing South Vietnam

South Vietnam
- Association: Vietnam Badminton Federation (VBF)
- Confederation: BA (Asia)

Asian Men's Team Championships
- Appearances: 1 (first in 1969)
- Best result: Round of 16 (1969)

The South Vietnam national badminton team (Vietnamese: Đội tuyển cầu lông quốc gia Việt Nam Cộng hòa; French: Équipe nationale de badminton du Sud-Vietnam) represented the sovereign country of South Vietnam in international badminton competitions. The national team was controlled by the Republic of Vietnam Badminton Federation.

The national team have competed in continental events, such as the Asian Games, particularly in 1966. South Vietnam made their appearance in an international team tournament when the men's team represented the country at the 1965 Southeast Asian Peninsular Games.

The national team ceased after the reunification of the North and South regions. The Republic of Vietnam Badminton Federation was then revived as the Vietnam Badminton Federation in 1990.

== History ==
Badminton was first played in Vietnam in the early 1960s. For South Vietnam, the sport gained small popularity in the country and was played in Saigon (now called Ho Chi Minh City).

=== Men's team ===
South Vietnam competed in the men's team event at the 1965 Southeast Asian Peninsular Games. In the quarter-finals, they went head-to-head against Laos were eliminated after losing 3–0 to the Laotian team. In 1969, the team competed in the 1969 Asian Badminton Championships men's team event. The team failed to advance further as they lost 5–0 to the Philippines in the round of 16.

In 1971, the team were invited by the president of Indonesia, Suharto to participate in the 1971 Asian Badminton Championships in Jakarta. The team later declined their participation in the championships.

== Competitive record ==
=== Thomas Cup ===
| Year | Round | Pos |
|---|---|---|
| 1949 to 1973 | Did not enter | |

=== Uber Cup ===
| Year | Round | Pos |
|---|---|---|
| 1957 to 1972 | Did not enter | |

=== Asian Games ===
==== Men's team ====
| Year | Round | Pos |
|---|---|---|
| 1962 to 1974 | Did not enter | |

==== Women's team ====
| Year | Round | Pos |
|---|---|---|
| 1962 to 1974 | Did not enter | |

=== Asian Team Championships ===
==== Men's team ====
| Year | Round | Pos |
|---|---|---|
| 1962 | Did not enter | |
| 1965 | Did not enter | |
| 1969 | Round of 16 | 13th |
| 1971 | Withdrew | |

=== SEA Games ===
==== Men's team ====
| Year | Round | Pos |
|---|---|---|
| 1965 | Quarter-finals | 5th |
| 1971 | Did not enter | |
| 1973 | Did not enter | |

==== Women's team ====
| Year | Round | Pos |
|---|---|---|
| 1965 | Did not enter | |
| 1971 | Did not enter | |
| 1973 | Did not enter | |

**Red border color indicates tournament was held on home soil.

== Players ==
=== Squad ===
As of 1965 Southeast Asian Peninsular Games

==== Men's team ====
| Name | DoB/Age | Ranking of event | | |
| Name | DoB/Age | MS | MD | XD |
|---|---|---|---|---|
| Âu Tâm Đệ | | - | - | - |
| Nguyễn Văn Ngọc | | - | - | - |
| Thái Luân Hiền | | - | - | - |
| Nguyễn Không Phước | | - | - | - |
| Lâm Trình | | - | - | - |

==== Women's team ====
| Name | DoB/Age | Ranking of event | | |
| Name | DoB/Age | WS | WD | XD |
|---|---|---|---|---|
| Nguyễn Thị Thúy Hồng | | - | - | - |

== See also ==
- Vietnam national badminton team
- Sport in Vietnam
