= Badminton at the 1970 Asian Games – Men's team =

Men's team at the 1970 Asian Games
- Venue: Kittikachorn Stadium, Thailand
- Dates: 11 – 14 December 1970

Medalists
| gold medal | Indonesia; Indra Gunawan, Rudy Hartono, Indratno, Mintarja, Muljadi, Iie Sumirat |
| silver medal | Thailand; Soonchai Akyapisut, Chavalert Chumkum, Bandid Jaiyen, Sangob Rattanusorn, Pornchai Sakuntaniyom, Sila Ulao |
| bronze medal | Malaysia; Punch Gunalan, Lee Kok Peng, Abdul Rahman Mohamed, Ng Boon Bee, Ng Tat Wai, Tan Soon Hooi |
| bronze medal | Japan; Junji Honma, Ippei Kojima, Hiroshi Taniguchi, Shōichi Toganoo |

The badminton men's team tournament at the 1970 Asian Games took place from 11 to 14 December at the Kittikachorn Stadium in Bangkok, Thailand.

== Schedule ==
All times are Indochina Time (UTC+07:00)

| Date | Time | Event |
|---|---|---|
| Friday, 11 December 1970 | 14:00 | Quarter-finals |
| Saturday, 12 December 1970 | 14:00 | Semi-finals |
| Monday, 14 December 1970 | 14:00 | Gold medal match |

== Bracket ==
Quarter-finals
Thailand | 3
Republic of China | 0
Philippines | 0
Malaysia | 3
Japan | 3
Hong Kong | 0
Nepal | 0
Indonesia | 3

Semi-finals
Thailand | 3
Malaysia | 1
Japan | 1
Indonesia | 3

Gold medal match
Thailand | 0
Indonesia | 3

== Quarter-finals ==
=== Thailand vs Republic of China (Taiwan) ===
Thailand
3
Kittikachorn Stadium
11 December 1970, 14:00

Republic оf China
0

| | | | 1 | 2 | 3 |
|---|---|---|---|---|---|---|
| 1 | (Thailand) (Taiwan) | Sangob Rattanusorn; Ho Wen-ming | 15; 1 | 15; 1 |
| 2 | (Thailand) (Taiwan) | Bandid Jaiyen; Lin Chiung-chih | 15; 0 | 17; 2 |
| 3 | (Thailand) (Taiwan) | Sangob Rattanusorn / Sila Ulao; Lin Tsung-ping / Lu Wen-hui | 15; 2 | 15; 5 |
| 4 | (Thailand) (Taiwan) | Chavalert Chumkum / Pornchai Sakuntaniyom; Ho Wen-ming / Lin Chiung-chih | | | | not played |
| 5 | (Thailand) (Taiwan) | Soonchai Akyapisut; Lu Wen-hui | | | | not played |

=== Malaysia vs Philippines ===
Malaysia
3
Kittikachorn Stadium
11 December 1970, 14:00

Philippines
0

| | | | 1 | 2 | 3 |
|---|---|---|---|---|---|---|
| 1 | (Malaysia) (Philippines) | Punch Gunalan; James Lim | 15; 2 | 15; 3 |
| 2 | (Malaysia) (Philippines) | Abdul Rahman Mohamed; Daniel So | 15; 2 | 15; 8 |
| 3 | (Malaysia) (Philippines) | Punch Gunalan / Ng Boon Bee; Conrado Co / Armando Yanga | 15; 3 | 15; 11 |
| 4 | (Malaysia) (Philippines) | Punch Gunalan; Daniel So | | | | not played |
| 5 | (Malaysia) (Philippines) | Abdul Rahman Mohamed; James Lim | | | | not played |

=== Japan vs Hong Kong ===
Japan
3
Kittikachorn Stadium
11 December 1970, 14:00

Hong Kong
0

| | | | 1 | 2 | 3 |
|---|---|---|---|---|---|---|
| 1 | (Japan) (Hong Kong) | Ippei Kojima; Wong Fai Hung | 15; 5 | 15; 1 |
| 2 | (Japan) (Hong Kong) | Shōichi Toganoo; Tsoi Fai | 15; 2 | 17; 3 |
| 3 | (Japan) (Hong Kong) | Junji Honma / Shōichi Toganoo; Wong Cheong Leong / Wong Fai Hung | 15; 12 | 15; 2 |
| 4 | (Japan) (Hong Kong) | Ippei Kojima / Hiroshi Taniguchi; Koo Man For / Tsoi Fai | | | | not played |
| 5 | (Japan) (Hong Kong) | Junji Honma; Tsoi Fai | | | | not played |

=== Indonesia vs Nepal ===
Indonesia
3
Kittikachorn Stadium
11 December 1970, 14:00

Nepal
0

| | | | 1 | 2 | 3 |
|---|---|---|---|---|---|---|
| 1 | (Indonesia) (Nepal) | Rudy Hartono; Singha Bahadur Basnyat | 15; 0 | 15; 0 |
| 2 | (Indonesia) (Nepal) | Iie Sumirat; K. C. Balaram | 15; 0 | 15; 0 |
| 3 | (Indonesia) (Nepal) | Indra Gunawan / Rudy Hartono; Girendra Singh / Kishor Bahadur Singha | 15; 0 | 15; 1 |
| 4 | (Indonesia) (Nepal) | Indratno / Mintarja; Singha Bahadur Basnyat / K. C. Balaram | | | | not played |
| 5 | (Indonesia) (Nepal) | Muljadi; Kishor Bahadur Singha | | | | not played |

== Semi-finals ==
=== Thailand vs Malaysia ===
Thailand
3
Kittikachorn Stadium
12 December 1970, 14:00

Malaysia
1

| | | | 1 | 2 | 3 |
|---|---|---|---|---|---|---|
| 1 | (Thailand) (Malaysia) | Sangob Rattanusorn; Lee Kok Peng | 15; 8 | 15; 10 |
| 2 | (Thailand) (Malaysia) | Bandid Jaiyen; Punch Gunalan | 17; 14 | 10; 15 | 15; 11 |
| 3 | (Thailand) (Malaysia) | Chavalert Chumkum / Pornchai Sakuntaniyom; Ng Boon Bee / Punch Gunalan | 10; 15 | 15; 10 | 11; 15 |
| 4 | (Thailand) (Malaysia) | Sangob Rattanusorn / Sila Ulao; Ng Tat Wai / Tan Soon Hooi | 15; 9 | 15; 3 |
| 5 | (Thailand) (Malaysia) | Soonchai Akyapisut; Abdul Rahman Mohamed | | | | not played |

=== Indonesia vs Japan ===
Indonesia
3
Kittikachorn Stadium
12 December 1970, 14:00

Japan
1

| | | | 1 | 2 | 3 |
|---|---|---|---|---|---|---|
| 1 | (Indonesia) (Japan) | Rudy Hartono; Junji Honma | 15; 1 | 15; 4 |
| 2 | (Indonesia) (Japan) | Muljadi; Ippei Kojima | 15; 9 | 12; 15 | 5; 15 |
| 3 | (Indonesia) (Japan) | Indra Gunawan / Rudy Hartono; Junji Honma / Shōichi Toganoo | 15; 12 | 15; 4 |
| 4 | (Indonesia) (Japan) | Indratno / Mintarja; Ippei Kojima / Hiroshi Taniguchi | 15; 4 | 15; 10 |
| 5 | (Indonesia) (Japan) | Iie Sumirat; Shōichi Toganoo | | | | not played |

== Gold medal match ==
=== Indonesia vs Thailand ===
Indonesia
3
Kittikachorn Stadium
14 December 1970, 14:00

Thailand
0

| | | | 1 | 2 | 3 |
|---|---|---|---|---|---|---|
| 1 | (Indonesia) (Thailand) | Muljadi; Sangob Rattanusorn | 15; 7 | 8; 15 | 15; 12 |
| 2 | (Indonesia) (Thailand) | Rudy Hartono; Soonchai Akyapisut | 15; 8 | 15; 1 |
| 3 | (Indonesia) (Thailand) | Indra Gunawan / Rudy Hartono; Sangob Rattanusorn / Sila Ulao | 15; 6 | 15; 6 |
| 4 | (Indonesia) (Thailand) | Indratno / Mintarja; Sangob Rattanusorn / Sila Ulao | | | | not played |
| 5 | (Indonesia) (Thailand) | Iie Sumirat; Bandid Jaiyen | | | | not played |
