= Nhat Nam =

Nhat Nam may refer to:

- Nhất Nam (martial art), (from "One Vietnam" 一南)
- Nhật Nam (region), Chinese Rinan Han commandery (日南)
