= Badminton at the 1971 SEAP Games – Individual event =

Event at 1971 SEAP Games

Tournament details
- Dates: 14–15 December 1971
- Venue: Selangor Badminton Association Hall
- Location: Kuala Lumpur, Malaysia

Champions
- Men's singles: (Malaysia) Tan Aik Huang
- Women's singles: (Malaysia) Rosalind Singha Ang
- Men's doubles: (Malaysia) Punch Gunalan (Malaysia) Ng Boon Bee
- Women's doubles: (Thailand) Thongkam Kingmanee (Thailand) Pachara Pattabongse
- Mixed doubles: (Malaysia) Ng Tat Wai (Malaysia) Teh Mei Ling

The individual events for badminton at the 1971 SEAP Games were held from 14 to 15 December 1971 at the Selangor Badminton Association Hall, Kuala Lumpur, Malaysia, with finals played at the Stadium Negara. Five events were contested: the men's singles, women's singles, men's doubles, women's doubles and mixed doubles.

== Men's singles ==
=== Seeds ===
1. (Malaysia) Punch Gunalan (silver medalist)
2. (Thailand) Bandid Jaiyen (bronze medalist)

=== Draw ===
First round
Heng Sinuon (KHM)	10	9
Ng Chor Yau (SIN)	15	15

Quarter-final
1	Punch Gunalan (MAL)	15	15
Chaisak Thongdejsri (THA)	0	2
San Myint (BIR)	18	15
Ng Chor Yau (SIN)	13	8
Wee Kin (SIN)	7	2
Tan Aik Huang (MAL)	15	15
Wai Nyunt (BIR)	2	7
2	Bandid Jaiyen (THA)	15	15

Semi-final
1	Punch Gunalan (MAL)	15	15
San Myint (BIR)	6	6
Tan Aik Huang (MAL)	15	15
2	Bandid Jaiyen (THA)	6	1

Final
1	Punch Gunalan (MAL)	12	11
Tan Aik Huang (MAL)	15	15
Third place
San Myint (BIR)	3	6
2	Bandid Jaiyen (THA)	15	15

== Women's singles ==
=== Seeds ===
1. (Thailand) Thongkam Kingmanee (silver medalist)
2. (Malaysia) Rosalind Singha Ang (gold medalist)

=== Draw ===
First round
1	Thongkam Kingmanee (THA)	6	11	11
Lim Choo Eng (SIN)	11	6	1
Yap Hei Lin (MAL)	9	11	11
Thi Do My Lanh (KHM)	11	2	4
Lim Siew Choo (SIN)	8	11	9
Petchroong Liengtrakulngam (THA)	11	7	12

Semi-final
1	Thongkam Kingmanee (THA)	11	11	11
Yap Hei Lin (MAL)	1	12	3
Petchroong Liengtrakulngam (THA)	4	3
2	Rosalind Singha Ang (MAL)	11	11

Final
1	Thongkam Kingmanee (THA)	5	6
2	Rosalind Singha Ang (MAL)	11	11
Third place
Yap Hei Lin (MAL)	4	7
Petchroong Liengtrakulngam (THA)	11	11

== Men's doubles ==
=== Seeds ===
1. (Malaysia) Punch Gunalan / (Malaysia) Ng Boon Bee (gold medalist)
2. (Thailand) Bandid Jaiyen / (Thailand) Thonchai Pongpoon (bronze medalist)

=== Draw ===
First round
Lee Ah Ngo (SIN); Ong Tiong Khiam (SIN)	7	4
Chirasak Champakao (THA); Pornchai Sakuntaniyom (THA)	15	15
Ho Khim Kooi (MAL); Ng Tat Wai (MAL)	15	15
San Maung (BIR); San Myint (BIR)	3	1

Quarter-final
1	Punch Gunalan (MAL); Ng Boon Bee (MAL)	15	15
Sek Sampoing (KHM); Smas Slayman (KHM)	1	9
Sai Khan Pan (BIR); Wai Nyunt (BIR)	9	11
Chirasak Champakao (THA); Pornchai Sakuntaniyom (THA)	15	15
Ho Khim Kooi (MAL); Ng Tat Wai (MAL)	15	15
Low Kee Wah (SIN); Ng Chor Yau (SIN)	1	2
Heng Sinuon (KHM); Heng Siphan (KHM)	7	5
2	Bandid Jaiyen (THA); Thonchai Pongpoon (THA)	15	15

Semi-final
1	Punch Gunalan (MAL); Ng Boon Bee (MAL)	15	15
Chirasak Champakao (THA); Pornchai Sakuntaniyom (THA)	3	7
Ho Khim Kooi (MAL); Ng Tat Wai (MAL)	15	15
2	Bandid Jaiyen (THA); Thonchai Pongpoon (THA)	6	4

Final
1	Punch Gunalan (MAL); Ng Boon Bee (MAL)	15	15
Ho Khim Kooi (MAL); Ng Tat Wai (MAL)	10	10
Third place
Chirasak Champakao (THA); Pornchai Sakuntaniyom (THA)
2	Bandid Jaiyen (THA); Thonchai Pongpoon (THA)	w	/	o

== Women's doubles ==
=== Seeds ===
1. (Thailand) Thongkam Kingmanee / (Thailand) Pachara Pattabongse (gold medalist)
2. (Malaysia) Rosalind Singha Ang / (Malaysia) Teoh Siew Yong (silver medalist)

=== Draw ===
First round
Juliana Lee (SIN); Lim Choo Eng (SIN)	2	10
Sylvia Tan (MAL); Teh Mei Ling (MAL)	15	15
Sumol Chanklum (THA); Petchroong Liengtrakulngam (THA)	15	15
Leong Kaye Peng (SIN); Leong Kaye Sine (SIN)	6	1

Semi-final
1	Thongkam Kingmanee (THA); Pachara Pattabongse (THA)	15	15
Sylvia Tan (MAL); Teh Mei Ling (MAL)	10	8
Sumol Chanklum (THA); Petchroong Liengtrakulngam (THA)	8	6
2	Rosalind Singha Ang (MAL); Teoh Siew Yong (MAL)	15	15

Final
1	Thongkam Kingmanee (THA); Pachara Pattabongse (THA)	15	15
2	Rosalind Singha Ang (MAL); Teoh Siew Yong (MAL)	8	8
Third place
Sylvia Tan (MAL); Teh Mei Ling (MAL)	15	11	15
Sumol Chanklum (THA); Petchroong Liengtrakulngam (THA)	6	15	3

== Mixed doubles ==
=== Seeds ===
1. (Malaysia) Ng Boon Bee / (Malaysia) Rosalind Singha Ang (silver medalist)
2. (Malaysia) Ng Tat Wai / (Malaysia) Teh Mei Ling (gold medalist)

=== Draw ===
First round
2	Ng Tat Wai (MAL); Teh Mei Ling (MAL)	11	15	15
Pornchai Sakuntaniyom (THA); Pachara Pattabongse (THA)	15	13	3

Semi-final
1	Ng Boon Bee (MAL); Rosalind Singha Ang (MAL)	15	15
Chirasak Champakao (THA); Sumol Chanklum (THA)	4	2
Smas Slayman (KHM); Thi Do My Lanh (KHM)	8	6
2	Ng Tat Wai (MAL); Teh Mei Ling (MAL)	15	15

Final
1	Ng Boon Bee (MAL); Rosalind Singha Ang (MAL)
2	Ng Tat Wai (MAL); Teh Mei Ling (MAL)	w	/	o
Third place
Chirasak Champakao (THA); Sumol Chanklum (THA)	15	15
Smas Slayman (KHM); Thi Do My Lanh (KHM)	1	2

== See also ==
- Men's team tournament
- Women's team tournament
