= Badminton at the 1963 GANEFO =

- Venue: Istora Senayan, Jakarta, Indonesia
- Dates: 14 – 19 November 1963
- Competitors: 52 from 9 nations

Badminton was contested at the 1963 GANEFO from 14 to 19 November 1963. The events were held at the Istora Senayan Stadium in Jakarta, Indonesia. The events held were men's singles, women's singles, men's doubles, women's doubles as well as the men's and women's team competition.

Eight national teams took part in the men's team competitions with hosts Indonesia seeded first and China seeded second. Only two teams competed in the women's team event. Therefore, no bronze medal was awarded for the women's team event. Indonesia's top players, Tan Joe Hok and Ferry Sonneville did not take part in the competition.

== Medalists ==
Event	Gold	Silver	Bronze
Men's singles	Tang Xianhu; China	Hou Jiachang; China	Ang Tjin Siang; Indonesia
Women's singles	Minarni; Indonesia	Liang Xiaomu; China	Chen Yuniang; China
Men's doubles	Indonesia; Tan King Gwan; Abdul Patah Unang	China; Lin Jiancheng; Wu Junsheng	China; Tang Xianhu; Zhang Zhucheng
Women's doubles	Indonesia; Retno Koestijah; Minarni	China; Chen Yuniang; Liang Xiaomu	China; Chen Jiayan; Chen Liquan
Men's team	Indonesia; Johnny Tjoa; Ting Oen Hie; Tan King Gwan; Abdul Patah Unang; Nana Soetisna; Ang Tjin Siang	China; Lin Jiancheng; Hou Jiachang; Tang Xianhu; Wu Junsheng; Zhang Zhucheng	Pakistan; Nazir Rajput; Akram Baig; Saleem Butt
Women's team	China; Chen Yuniang; Liang Xiaomu; Chen Jiayan; Lin Jianying; Chen Liquan	Indonesia; Minarni; Retno Koestijah; Megah Idawati; Corry Kawilarang; Oei Lin Nio; Happy Herowati	Not awarded

== Medal table ==
* Host nation (Indonesia)

Rank	Nation	Gold	Silver	Bronze	Total
1	Indonesia (INA)*	4	1	1	6
2	China (CHN)	2	5	3	10
3	Pakistan (PAK)	0	0	1	1
Totals (3 entries)		6	6	5	17

== Team results ==
=== Men's team ===
Quarter-finals
1	Indonesia	5
Japan	0
Ceylon	3
4	Mexico	2
3	Pakistan	4
Laos	1
Philippines	0
2	China	5

Semi-finals
1	Indonesia	5
Ceylon	0
3	Pakistan	0
2	China	5

Final
1	Indonesia	3
2	China	2
Third place
Ceylon	0
3	Pakistan	5

==== Semi-finals ====
Indonesia
5
Istora Senayan
15 November 1963

Ceylon
0

			1	2	3
1	(Indonesia) (Dominion of Ceylon)	Johnny Tjoa; L. R. Ariyananda	15; 3	15; 3
2	(Indonesia) (Dominion of Ceylon)	Ting Oen Hie; Gerry Chandrasena	15; 3	15; 6
3	(Indonesia) (Dominion of Ceylon)	Tan King Gwan / Abdul Patah Unang; Sam Chandrasena / V. Sriskandarajah	15; 6	15; 6
4	(Indonesia) (Dominion of Ceylon)	Ting Oen Hie; L. R. Ariyananda	15; 2	15; 0
5	(Indonesia) (Dominion of Ceylon)	Johnny Tjoa; Gerry Chandrasena				w/o

China
5
Istora Senayan
15 November 1963

Pakistan
0

			1	2	3
1	(China) (Pakistan)	Tang Xianhu; Nazir Rajput	15; 6	15; 4
2	(China) (Pakistan)	Zhang Zhucheng; Akram Baig	15; 8	15; 4
3	(China) (Pakistan)	Lin Jiancheng / Wu Junsheng; Saleem Butt / Nazir Rajput	15; 2	15; 2
4	(China) (Pakistan)	Zhang Zhucheng; Nazir Rajput	15; 6	15; 8
5	(China) (Pakistan)	Tang Xianhu; Akram Baig	15; 2	15; 2

==== 3rd place ====
Pakistan
5
Istora Senayan
16 November 1963

Ceylon
0

			1	2	3
1	(Pakistan) (Dominion of Ceylon)	Nazir Rajput; L. R. Ariyananda	15; 10	15; 5
2	(Pakistan) (Dominion of Ceylon)	Akram Baig; Gerry Chandrasena	15; 3	15; 7
3	(Pakistan) (Dominion of Ceylon)	Saleem Butt / Nazir Rajput; Sam Chandrasena / V. Sriskandarajah	15; 11	15; 7
4	(Pakistan) (Dominion of Ceylon)	Akram Baig; L. R. Ariyananda	15; 8	15; 6
5	(Pakistan) (Dominion of Ceylon)	Nazir Rajput; Gerry Chandrasena	15; 4	15; 3

==== Final ====
Indonesia
3
Istora Senayan
16 November 1963

China
2

			1	2	3
1	(Indonesia) (China)	Nana Soetisna; Hou Jiachang	4; 15	6; 15
2	(Indonesia) (China)	Johnny Tjoa; Tang Xianhu	16; 17	15; 13	15; 7
3	(Indonesia) (China)	Tan King Gwan / Abdul Patah Unang; Lin Jiancheng / Wu Junsheng	15; 4	15; 6
4	(Indonesia) (China)	Nana Soetisna; Tang Xianhu	15; 11	15; 12
5	(Indonesia) (China)	Johnny Tjoa; Hou Jiachang				w/o

=== Women's team ===
==== Indonesia vs China ====
Indonesia
1
Istora Senayan
15 November 1963

China
3

			1	2	3
1	(Indonesia) (China)	Corry Kawilarang; Liang Xiaomu	11; 3	3; 11	9; 12
2	(Indonesia) (China)	Megah Idawati; Chen Yuniang	2; 11	12; 10	7; 11
3	(Indonesia) (China)	Retno Koestijah / Minarni; Chen Yuniang / Liang Xiaomu	15; 12	15; 10
4	(Indonesia) (China)	Corry Kawilarang; Chen Yuniang	3; 11	3; 11
5	(Indonesia) (China)	Megah Idawati; Liang Xiaomu				not played

== Participating nations ==
A total of nine countries took part in badminton at the 1963 GANEFO.

- Ceylon (4)
- China (11)
- East Germany (2)
- Indonesia (12)
- Japan (5)
- Laos (5)
- Mexico (6)
- Pakistan (3)
- Philippines (4)
