= Badminton at the 1971 SEAP Games =

SEA Games event

Badminton at the 1971 Southeast Asian Peninsular Games
- Venue: Selangor Badminton Association Hall & Stadium Negara (final matches)
- Dates: 12 – 15 December 1971
- Nations: 5

Badminton events for the 1971 SEAP Games were held at Kuala Lumpur, Malaysia, between 12 and 15 December 1971. At the end of the competitions, host Malaysia stood top in the tally by winning five gold medals while Thailand won gold medals in women's doubles and women's team events.

== Medal table ==
* Host nation (Malaysia)

Rank	Nation	Gold	Silver	Bronze	Total
1	Malaysia*	5	5	1	11
2	Thailand	2	2	4	8
3	Burma	0	0	1	1
3	Singapore	0	0	1	1
Totals (4 entries)		7	7	7	21

== Medalists ==
Event	Gold	Silver	Bronze
Men's singles	Tan Aik Huang; Malaysia	Punch Gunalan; Malaysia	Bandid Jaiyen; Thailand
Women's singles	Rosalind Singha Ang; Malaysia	Thongkam Kingmanee; Thailand	Petchroong Liengtrakulngam; Thailand
Men's doubles	Ng Boon Bee; Punch Gunalan; Malaysia	Ho Khim Kooi; Ng Tat Wai; Malaysia	Bandid Jaiyen; Thonchai Pongpoon; Thailand
Women's doubles	Thongkam Kingmanee; Pachara Pattabongse; Thailand	Rosalind Singha Ang; Teoh Siew Yong; Malaysia	Sylvia Tan; Teh Mei Ling; Malaysia
Mixed doubles	Ng Tat Wai; Teh Mei Ling; Malaysia	Ng Boon Bee; Rosalind Singha Ang; Malaysia	Chirasak Champakao; Sumol Chanklum; Thailand
Men's team	Malaysia; Punch Gunalan; Ho Khim Kooi; Ng Boon Bee; Ng Tat Wai; Abdul Rahman Mohamad; Tan Aik Huang	Thailand; Soonchai Akyapisut; Chirasak Champakao; Bandid Jaiyen; Thonchai Pongpoon; Pornchai Sakuntaniyom; Chaisak Thongdejsri	Burma; Sai Kham Pan; San Maung; San Myint; Wai Nyunt
Women's team	Thailand; Sumol Chanklum; Thongkam Kingmanee; Petchroong Liengtrakulngam; Pachara Pattabongse	Malaysia; Rosalind Singha Ang; Sylvia Tan; Teh Mei Ling; Teoh Siew Yong; Yap Hei Lin	Singapore; Juliana Lee; Leong Kay Peng; Leong Kay Sine; Lim Choo Eng; Lim Siew Choo
