= Chen Liquan =

Chinese materials scientist

Chen Liquan (Chinese: 陈立泉)
- Born: March 29, 1940 (age 86); Sichuan, China
- Education: University of Science and Technology of China
- Known for: Founding China's lithium battery industry
- Awards: China's Highest Science and Technology Award
- Scientific career
- Fields: Nanoionics, New Energy Materials and Their Applications
- Workplaces: Institute of Physics, Chinese Academy of Sciences

Chen Liquan, or "Liquan Chen" (surname last), is an academician of the Chinese Academy of Engineering and a researcher at the Institute of Physics, Chinese Academy of Sciences. He is honored with China's Highest Science and Technology Award and the title of "Founding Father of China's Battery Industry".

== Resume ==
Chen Liquan was born in 1940 in a mountain area of Nanchong in Sichuan Province of southwest China. The family used dim oil lamp at night. He did not experienced electric lighting until his high school exam, which made him select the electric power industry as his future career.

After graduating from the University of Science and Technology of China in 1964, Chen joined the Institute of Physics of the Chinese Academy of Sciences.

In 1976, on a 2-year research visit to Germany, at the Max Planck Institute for Solid State Research in Germany, Chen saw that a small button-sized lithium nitride solid-state battery could far outperform conventional lead-acid batteries.

In 1978, after returning to China from Germany, he started research on lithium-battery.

In 1981, China's first solid-state ionics laboratory was founded in the Chinese Academy of Sciences.

In 1988, China's first all-solid-state lithium metal battery was developed by Chen's research team.

In 1989, Chen Liquan won the first prize of the National Natural Science Award.

In 1995, Chen's team successfully developed the first liquid-electrolyte lithium battery of China.

In 1998, Chen led the construction of China's first pilot production line for lithium-ion batteries, with a capacity of producing 200,000 units annually.

In 2001, Chen was elected as an academician of the Chinese Academy of Engineering.

In 2014, China became the world's largest lithium battery producer.

In 2016, Chen and his colleagues presented the concept of in-situ solidification, for the liquid electrolyte to transform into solid state inside the battery cell.

In 2023, Chen's core technology enabled China to become the first country to achieve commercial deployment of solid-state batteries. Their cells reached a world record energy density of 360 watt-hours/kg.

In 2026, Chen Liquan received the Highest Science and Technology Award at the 11th national congress of the China Association for Science and Technology.

In the resent years, Chen's team is working on the development of all-solid-state and sodium-ion batteries.

== Contributions ==
Honored as the "Father of Lithium Batteries in China", Chen Liquan has made the following contributions:

- The development of China's first lithium battery
- The establishment of China's first pilot production line for lithium-ion batteries
- Nurturing industry giants such as CATL, supporting the development of new energy vehicles driven by lithium batteries.
- Proposing an in-situ solidification battery technology for development of new generation batteries, such as sodium-ion batteries.
- Cultivating a large number of research talents for the development of lithium battery industry.

== See also ==
- Highest Science and Technology Award
- Solid-state battery
- Institute of Physics, Chinese Academy of Sciences
