= Lee Young-soon =

South Korean politician (born 1962)

- 이영순

Member of the National Assembly
- In office 30 May 2004 – 29 May 2008
- Constituency: Proportional representation

Personal details
- Born: 5 March 1962 (age 64)
- Party: Progressive Party (2017–)
- Other political affiliations: New People's Party (2017); Independent (1999–2000, 2014–2017); Unified Progressive Party (2011–2014); Democratic Labor Party (2000–2011)

Lee Young-soon (Korean: 이영순, born 5 March 1962) is a South Korean politician who served as the 2nd head of Dong-gu, Ulsan Metropolitan City, and as a member of the 17th National Assembly.

== Political career ==
Between October 1999 and June 2002 she served as the District Mayor of Dong-gu in Ulsan Metropolitan City. She later joined the Democratic Labor Party. In the 2004 South Korean legislative election, she was elected as a proportional representative for the Democratic Labor Party. In 2008, she became a member of the Supreme Council of the Democratic Labor Party.

== Electoral history ==
Year	Election	Constituency	Position	Electoral district	Party	Votes	Vote share	Result	Notes
1999	October 28 by-election	2nd district	District head	Dong-gu, Ulsan	Independent	31,014	45.86%	1st	Elected
2004	2004 South Korean legislative election	17th National Assembly	Member of the National Assembly	Proportional representation	Democratic Labor Party	2,774,061	13.03%	3rd on proportional representative	Elected
2008	2008 South Korean legislative election	18th National Assembly	Member of the National Assembly	Nam-gu Gap, Ulsan	Democratic Labor Party	21,610	36.77%	2nd	Lost

== See also ==
- 17th National Assembly
- Democratic Labor Party
