= Badminton at the 1971 SEAP Games – Women's team =

Badminton competition

Badminton – Women's team at the 1971 Southeast Asian Peninsular Games
- Venue: Selangor Badminton Association Hall
- Dates: 12–13 December 1971
- Nations: 3

Medalists
gold medal	Thailand (THA)
silver medal	Malaysia (MAL)
bronze medal	Singapore (SGP)

The women's team badminton tournament at the 1971 SEAP Games was held from 12 to 13 December 1971 at the Selangor Badminton Association Hall, Kuala Lumpur, Malaysia. Only three teams (Malaysia, Singapore and defending champions Thailand) competed in this event, with Singapore and Thailand facing off first with the loser having to play Malaysia in a second semi-final tie to determine the finalists.

== Schedule ==
All times are Malaysia Standard Time (UTC+07:30)

Date	Time	Event
Sunday, 12 December	09:00	Semi-final
Sunday, 12 December	19:00	Semi-final
Monday, 13 December	09:00	Gold medal match

== Round robin ==
Pos	Team	Pld	W	L	MF	MA	MD	GF	GA	GD	PF	PA	PD	Pts	Qualification
1	Thailand	2	2	0	6	2	+4	13	4	+9	194	143	+51	2	Gold medal
2	Malaysia	2	1	1	5	3	+2	10	7	+3	186	143	+43	1	Silver medal
3	Singapore	2	0	2	0	6	−6	0	12	−12	55	149	−94	0	Bronze medal

Source: NewspaperSG

=== Thailand vs Singapore ===
Thailand
3
Selangor Badminton Association Hall
12 December 1971 09:00 7:30

Singapore
0

			1	2	3
1	(Thailand) (Singapore)	Thongkam Kingmanee; Lim Choo Eng	11; 7	11; 7
2	(Thailand) (Singapore)	Petchroong Liengtrakulngam; Lim Siew Choo	11; 7	11; 2
3	(Thailand) (Singapore)	Thongkam Kingmanee / Pachara Pattabongse; Lim Choo Eng / Lim Siew Choo	15; 1	15; 8
4	(Thailand) (Singapore)	Sumol Chanklum / Petchroong Liengtrakulngam; Leong Kay Peng / Leong Kay Sine				not played
5	(Thailand) (Singapore)	Sumol Chanklum; Juliana Lee				not played

=== Malaysia vs Singapore ===
Malaysia
3
Selangor Badminton Association Hall
12 December 1971 19:00 7:30

Singapore
0

			1	2	3
1	(Malaysia) (Singapore)	Rosalind Singha Ang; Lim Choo Eng	12; 10	11; 1
2	(Malaysia) (Singapore)	Yap Hei Lin; Lim Siew Choo	11; 8	11; 2
3	(Malaysia) (Singapore)	Rosalind Singha Ang / Teoh Siew Yong; Lim Choo Eng / Lim Siew Choo	15; 1	15; 1
4	(Malaysia) (Singapore)	Sylvia Tan / Teh Mei Ling; Leong Kay Peng / Leong Kay Sine	15	15		not played
5	(Malaysia) (Singapore)	Sylvia Tan; Juliana Lee				not played

=== Thailand vs Malaysia ===
Thailand
3
Selangor Badminton Association Hall
13 December 1971 09:00 7:30

Malaysia
2

			1	2	3
1	(Thailand) (Malaysia)	Thongkam Kingmanee; Yap Hei Lin	11; 1	11; 2
2	(Thailand) (Malaysia)	Petchroong Liengtrakulngam; Rosalind Singha Ang	4; 11	1; 11
3	(Thailand) (Malaysia)	Thongkam Kingmanee / Pachara Pattabongse; Rosalind Singha Ang / Teoh Siew Yong	17; 16	15; 10
4	(Thailand) (Malaysia)	Sumol Chanklum / Petchroong Liengtrakulngam; Sylvia Tan / Yap Hei Lin	15; 12	16; 17	8; 15
5	(Thailand) (Malaysia)	Sumol Chanklum; Sylvia Tan	11; 8	11; 8

== See also ==
- Individual event tournament
- Men's team tournament
