= Sport in Vietnam =

This article presents an overview of the Sports in Vietnam.

== Team sports ==
=== Australian rules football ===
Australian rules football has been played in Vietnam since 1998, when the Saigon Saints was formed by expatriate Australians. It was followed after by rivals the Hanoi Hawks, established by Australian expatriates. The Saigon Saints stopped playing in 2001.

In 2003, Australian rules football was reborn in Hanoi under the Hanoi Swans banner with a tri-nations tournament against Hong Kong and Thailand. In 2007, a movement started in Saigan to get footy up again with the goal of combining with Hanoi to form a national team, the Vietnam Swans.

In July 2007, the Vietnam Swans played together for the first time in Bangkok for the 8th Annual Asian Championships. They returned to the Asian Championships in 2008 in Singapore and have been playing since.

In 2009, highlights included the ANZAC Day Match against the Thailand Tigers at Hellfire Pass on the Death Burma Railway; a Black Saturday Tribute Match and Fundraiser against the Bali Geckos a match against HMAS Darwin and the Asian Championships.

=== Basketball ===
Basketball has been played in Ho Chi Minh City, Hanoi and Soc Trang.

The Vietnamese national basketball team at the 2019 Southeast Asian Games earned the bronze medal. Vietnam women's national basketball team get gold medal at the Basketball at the 2023 Southeast Asian Games in 3x3 competition after defeating Philippines in the final.

=== Football (Association) ===
Association football in Vietnam is run by the Vietnam Football Federation. The federation administers the Vietnam national football team, the Vietnam Second Division, and the Vietnam Third Division. The top 2 leagues in the country, V.League 1 and V.League 2 are administered by the Vietnam Professional Football (VPF) company.

When Vietnam was split into North Vietnam and South Vietnam, 2 national teams existed. The North Vietnamese national team played mostly exclusively against other Communist countries between 1956 and 1966, while the South Vietnamese national team took part in the first 2 AFC Asian Cup finals, finishing fourth place both times.

=== Handball ===
Vietnam men's and women's national handball won gold medals at the 2021 Southeast Asian Games.

=== Rugby union ===
Rugby union was introduced when Vietnam was part of French Indochina, and this was by French expatriates. After independence there was a hiatus because of financial and political forces, from famine to the Vietnam War.

A number of people who could qualify for Vietnam's national rugby union team play in France. An example is the MHRC player François Trinh-Duc, who has a Vietnamese grandfather.

=== Volleyball ===
The National volleyball team won silver medals at the Southeast Asian Games. At the 2023 Asian Women's Club Volleyball Championship, the national team played as Sport Center won the title for the first time. The women's team won 2023 AVC Women's Challenge Cup.

== Individual sports ==
=== Athletics ===
Bui Thi Nhung and Vu Thi Huong are 2 athletes from Vietnam.

Bui Thi Nhung won the gold medal at the 2003 Asian Athletics Championships, and finished 4th at the 2006 Asian Games. Bui Thi Nhung competed at the 2004 Summer Olympics without reaching the final.

Vu Thi Huong is a track and field sprint athlete who competes internationally for Vietnam.

Huong won the silver medal in women's 100m event and the bronze medal in women's 200m event at the 2007 Asian Athletics Championship in Amman, Jordan.

At some Southeast Asian Games editions, she has been dominating the short distances. She won the double (both 100m and 200m) gold medal at the 2007 Southeast Asian Games in Thailand, and the 100m gold and 200m silver at the 2005 Southeast Asian Games in the Philippines. At the first SEA Games in her career (2003 in Vietnam), she won bronze medal in the 100m and silver medal in the 4x100 relay with the Vietnam team.

Huong represented Vietnam at the 2008 Summer Olympics in Beijing. She competed at the 100m sprint and placed third in her first round heat, after Kim Gevaert and Yulia Nestsiarenka in a time of 11.65 seconds. She qualified for the second round in which she failed to qualify for the semi-finals as her time of 11.70 seconds was the 8th and slowest time of her race.

=== Chess ===
Vietnam is home to chess players who compete successfully internationally, some being Hoang Thanh Trang, Lê Quang Liêm, and Nguyen Ngoc Truong Son.

Lê Quang Liêm won the World Blitz Chess Champion in 2013. Also ranked 16th on Chess.com live ratings and 18th on FIDE rankings (as of March 2025)

=== Motorsport ===
Powerboating was one of the first motorsport disciplines to be contested in Vietnam. The inaugural event was held in Quy Nhon in 2024, featuring two major disciplines: F1H2O and Aquabike. Vietnam gained significant recognition in the sport by sponsoring Team Vietnam, which achieved remarkable success during the 2024 season. The team, led by driver Jonas Andersson, clinched the championship title in the F1H2O category, marking a historic milestone for Vietnam in international motorsport.

== Martial arts ==
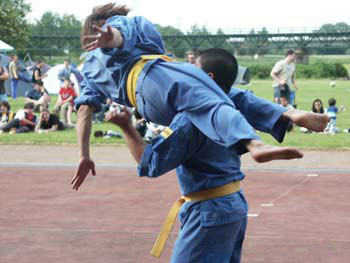
Flying scissors to the neck. The opponent is forced to the ground with a twist of the body.

Some of the martial arts schools emerging from Vo Co Truyen's development practice Vo Thuat:

- Van Vo Dao (Vo Su Kinh Chu)
- Vo Vietnam (Nguyen Duc Moc)
- Vo Thuat (Nguyen Van Trung)
- Vo Binh Dinh/Tay Son Binh Dinh (Thanh Long)
- Minh Long (Tran Minh Long)
- Kim Long (Nguyen Trung Hoa)
- Vovinam Viet Vo Dao (Nguyen Loc)
- Nhat Nam (Ngo Xuan Bing)
- Tay Son Nhan (Vo Su To Dinh Thanh)
- Lam Chanh Tong
- Viet Dao Quan (Giao Su Tien Si Dang Quang Luong)

In Vietnam, people practice:

- Vo Co Truyen
- Thieu Lam Viet Nam
- Kim Ke-Tay Son Nhan
- Phakwondo (Hoa Quyen Dao)
- Hong Gia Viet Nam
- Nam Huynh Dao
- Lam Son

There are Sino-Vietnamese styles. These are styles that are partially Vietnamese which were among Chinese who lived in Vietnam, for example:

- Thieu Lam (Shaolinquan)
- Noi Quyen (Neiquan)
- Bach My Phai (Baimeipai, Baimeiquan)

Other styles include:

- Mai Hoa Quyen (Meihuaquan)
- Sa Long Cuong
- Quan Khi Dao

Vovinam and Nhat Nam are some of the Vietnamese martial arts, followed by others.

== See also ==
- Traditional games of Vietnam
- List of Vietnam world champions in sports
