= Darmadi =

Indonesian badminton player (born 1945)

Personal information
- Born: Wong Pek Sen 黄培森; 1945 (age 80–81) Surakarta, Central Java, Indonesia

Sport
- Country: Indonesia
- Sport: Badminton
Medal record
Men's badminton
Representing Indonesia
Thomas Cup
| Gold medal – first place | 1970 Kuala Lumpur | Men's team |
Asian Games
| Silver medal – second place | 1966 Bangkok | Men's singles |
| Bronze medal – third place | 1966 Bangkok | Mixed doubles |
Asian Championships
| Gold medal – first place | 1969 Manila | Men's team |

Darmadi (born 1945; as Wong Pek Sen; Chinese: 黄培森) is an Indonesian badminton player from the 60s to 70s.

== Career ==
Darmadi competed at the 1966 Asian Games in Bangkok, Thailand. He managed to bring home two medals; a silver in the men's singles and bronze in the mixed doubles. He and with the men's team also succeeded in bringing Indonesia to conquer Malaysia in the third 1969 Asian Badminton Championships in the Philippines for the first time. He also played in the men's doubles with partner Ang Tjin Siang (later known as Muljadi) and won the French Open in 1966. Partnered with Minarni in the mixed doubles, they won 1967 Singapore and Canada Opens. Darmadi and the Indonesian men's team also succeeded in bringing Indonesia back to the winner of the 1970 Thomas Cup men's team championship after defeating Malaysia in the final.

== Achievements ==
=== Asian Games ===
Men's singles
| Year | Venue | Opponent | Score | Result |
|---|---|---|---|---|
| 1966 | Kittikachorn Stadium, Bangkok, Thailand | (Indonesia) Ang Tjin Siang | 5–3, retired | Silver |

Mixed's doubles
| Year | Venue | Partner | Opponent | Score | Result |
|---|---|---|---|---|---|
| 1966 | Kittikachorn Stadium, Bangkok, Thailand | (Indonesia) Minarni | (Malaysia) Teh Kew San (Malaysia) Rosalind Singha Ang | 15–3, 8–15, 6–15 | Bronze |

=== International tournaments ===
Men's singles
| Year | Tournament | Opponent | Score | Result | Ref. |
|---|---|---|---|---|---|
| 1965 | Den Haag Championships | (Indonesia) Ang Tjin Siang | 17–14, 15–9 | (gold) Winner | |
| 1967 | Malaysia Open | (Denmark) Erland Kops | 10–15, 3–15 | (silver) Runner-up | |
| 1968 | Singapore Pesta | (Indonesia) Rudy Hartono | 15–9, 7–15, 15–10 | (gold) Winner | |
| 1969 | All England | (Indonesia) Rudy Hartono | 1–15, 3–15 | (silver) Runner-up | |

Men's doubles
| Year | Tournament | Partner | Opponent | Score | Result |
|---|---|---|---|---|---|
| 1966 | French Open | (Indonesia) Ang Tjin Siang | (England) J. T. Woolhouse (England) Lance Ellwood | 15–8, 15–6 | (gold) Winner |

Mixed doubles
| Year | Tournament | Partner | Opponent | Score | Result |
|---|---|---|---|---|---|
| 1967 | Malaysia Open | (Indonesia) Minarni | (Indonesia) Tan Joe Hok (Indonesia) Retno Koestijah | 9–15, 8–15 | (silver) Runner-up |
| 1967 | Singapore Open | (Indonesia) Minarni | (Malaysia) Ng Boon Bee (Malaysia) Rosalind Singha Ang | 15–4, 15–5 | (gold) Winner |
| 1969 | Canada Open | (Indonesia) Minarni | (Malaysia) Ng Boon Bee (Indonesia) Retno Koestijah | 15–5, 17–15 | (gold) Winner |
