= Badminton at the 1971 SEAP Games – Men's team =

Badminton – Men's team at the 1971 Southeast Asian Peninsular Games
- Venue: Selangor Badminton Association Hall
- Dates: 12–13 December 1971
- Nations: 5

Medalists
gold medal	Malaysia (MAL)
silver medal	Thailand (THA)
bronze medal	Burma (BIR)

The men's team badminton tournament at the 1971 SEAP Games was held from 12 to 13 December 1971 at the Selangor Badminton Association Hall, Kuala Lumpur, Malaysia.

== Schedule ==
All times are Malaysia Standard Time (UTC+07:30)

Date	Time	Event
Sunday, 12 December	09:00	Semi-final
Sunday, 12 December	19:00	Semi-final
Monday, 13 December	09:00	Gold medal match

== Bracket ==
1st round
Burma (BIR)	3
Khmer Republic (KHM)	0

Semi-finals
Malaysia (MAL)	3
Burma (BIR)	1
Singapore (SIN)	1
Thailand (THA)	3

Final
Malaysia (MAL)	3
Thailand (THA)	2
Third place
Singapore (SIN)	0
Burma (BIR)	3

== First round ==
=== Burma vs Khmer Republic ===
Burma
3
Selangor Badminton Association Hall
12 December 1971 09:00 7:30

Khmer Republic
0

			1	2	3
1	(Myanmar) (Cambodia)	San Myint; Smas Slayman	15; 4	15; 7
2	(Myanmar) (Cambodia)	Wai Nyunt; Sek Sampoing	15; 8	11; 15	15; 2
3	(Myanmar) (Cambodia)	Sai Kham Pan / Wai Nyunt; Heng Sinuon / Heng Siphan	15; 5	15; 8
4	(Myanmar) (Cambodia)	San Maung / San Myint; Sek Sampoing / Smas Slayman				not played
5	(Myanmar) (Cambodia)	Sai Kham Pan; Heng Sinuon				not played

== Semi-finals ==
=== Thailand vs Singapore ===
Thailand
3
Selangor Badminton Association Hall
12 December 1971 14:00 7:30

Singapore
1

			1	2	3
1	(Thailand) (Singapore)	Bandid Jaiyen; Wee Kin	15; 1	15; 1
2	(Thailand) (Singapore)	Soonchai Akyapisut; Ong Tiong Khiam	15; 10	13; 18	14; 17
3	(Thailand) (Singapore)	Chirasak Champakao / Pornchai Sakuntaniyom; Low Kee Wah / Ng Chor Yau	15; 7	17; 4
4	(Thailand) (Singapore)	Bandid Jaiyen / Thonchai Pongpoon; Lee Ah Ngo / Wee Kin	15; 8	15; 7
5	(Thailand) (Singapore)	Chaisak Thongdejsri; Lee Ah Ngo				not played

=== Malaysia vs Burma ===
Malaysia
3
Selangor Badminton Association Hall
12 December 1971 14:00 7:30

Burma
1

			1	2	3
1	(Malaysia) (Myanmar)	Tan Aik Huang; San Myint	15; 4	15; 12
2	(Malaysia) (Myanmar)	Abdul Rahman Mohamad; Wai Nyunt	17; 18	2; 15
3	(Malaysia) (Myanmar)	Punch Gunalan / Ng Boon Bee; Sai Kham Pan / Wai Nyunt	15; 6	15; 2
4	(Malaysia) (Myanmar)	Ho Khim Kooi / Ng Tat Wai; San Maung / San Myint	15; 9	15; 3
5	(Malaysia) (Myanmar)	Punch Gunalan; Sai Kham Pan				not played

== Bronze medal match ==
=== Singapore vs Burma ===
Singapore
0
Selangor Badminton Association Hall
13 December 1971 09:00 7:30

Burma
3

			1	2	3
1	(Singapore) (Myanmar)	Wee Kin; San Myint	15; 9	8; 15	4; 15
2	(Singapore) (Myanmar)	Ong Tiong Khiam; Wai Nyunt	3; 15	8; 15
3	(Singapore) (Myanmar)	Low Kee Wah / Ng Chor Yau; Sai Kham Pan / Wai Nyunt	16; 17	16; 18
4	(Singapore) (Myanmar)	Lee Ah Ngo / Wee Kin; San Maung / San Myint				not played
5	(Singapore) (Myanmar)	Lee Ah Ngo; Sai Kham Pan				not played

== Finals ==
=== Thailand vs Malaysia ===
Malaysia
3
Selangor Badminton Association Hall
12 December 1971 19:00 7:30

Thailand
2

			1	2	3
1	(Malaysia) (Thailand)	Abdul Rahman Mohamad; Bandid Jaiyen	7; 15	8; 15
2	(Malaysia) (Thailand)	Tan Aik Huang; Chaisak Thongdejsri	15; 4	15; 2
3	(Malaysia) (Thailand)	Punch Gunalan / Ng Boon Bee; Chirasak Champakao / Pornchai Sakuntaniyom	15; 6	15; 6
4	(Malaysia) (Thailand)	Ho Khim Kooi / Ng Tat Wai; Bandid Jaiyen / Thonchai Pongpoon	8; 15	15; 5	9; 15
5	(Malaysia) (Thailand)	Punch Gunalan; Soonchai Akyapisut	15; 9	15; 7

== See also ==
- Individual event tournament
- Women's team tournament
