= Muljadi =

Indonesian badminton player

Personal information
- Born: Ang Tjin Siang; 11 September 1942 Jember, Dutch East Indies
- Died: 14 March 2010 (aged 67) Malang, Indonesia

Sport
- Country: Indonesia
- Sport: Badminton
Medal record
Men's badminton
Representing Indonesia
Thomas Cup
Gold medal – first place	1964 Tokyo	Men's team
Gold medal – first place	1970 Kuala Lumpur	Men's team
Gold medal – first place	1973 Jakarta	Men's team
Silver medal – second place	1967 Jakarta	Men's team
Asian Games
Gold medal – first place	1966 Bangkok	Men's singles
Gold medal – first place	1970 Bangkok	Men's team
Silver medal – second place	1966 Bangkok	Men's doubles
Silver medal – second place	1970 Bangkok	Men's singles
Asian Championships
Gold medal – first place	1969 Manila	Men's team
Gold medal – first place	1969 Manila	Men's singles
Gold medal – first place	1971 Jakarta	Men's team
GANEFO
Gold medal – first place	1963 Jakarta	Men's team
Bronze medal – third place	1963 Jakarta	Men's singles

Muljadi (born 1942; as Ang Tjin Siang; Chinese: 翁振祥) was a world class badminton player who represented Indonesia between 1963 and 1973. He officially changed his name to Muljadi in 1967 following the government regulation on name change.

== Career ==
Muljadi (right) with U.S. Open champion Rudy Hartono and Arnold Kilpatrick after the 1969 men's singles final.

Muljadi's career spanned two separate eras of Indonesian domination of the then triennial Thomas Cup (men's international team) competition: 1958 to 1964 and 1970 to 1979. Though he occasionally dropped matches in earlier Thomas Cup rounds, he was undefeated in singles (6–0) in four consecutive final round showdowns (1964, 1967, 1970, 1973), a record unmatched by better known teammates such as Ferry Sonneville, Tan Joe Hok, and Rudy Hartono. He won several Indonesian national singles titles during the 1960s as well as the French Open (1966), the Asian Championships (1969), and individual honors in the Asian Games (1966). He was runner-up to Hartono at the prestigious All-England Championships in 1971 but defeated Hartono to win the U.S. Open title that year. Muljadi died on 14 March 2010.

=== Thomas Cup ===
His story in the Thomas Cup began in 1964 in Tokyo. At that time, still competing as Ang Tjin Siang, he was a young player who had just won his first Indonesian national singles titles in 1963 and 1964. He was placed as the third singles behind his two seniors Ferry Sonneville and Tan Joe Hok. Indonesia, as the defending champion, had to go through the Challenge Round system. In the very tight final against Denmark that ended 5–4 for Indonesia, the young Ang Tjin Siang was fielded as the secret weapon against Henning Borch, the All England finalist that year, and he won convincingly in straight sets 15–10, 15–5. That point was crucial in securing the Thomas Cup for Indonesia and marked his first title.

Three years later in the 1967 Thomas Cup held in Jakarta, he had already changed his name to Muljadi. Indonesia faced Malaysia in the final and lost 3–6, having to settle for silver. Although the team lost, Muljadi's personal undefeated record in the final round remained intact.

The great comeback came in the 1970 Thomas Cup in Kuala Lumpur. Now firmly known as Muljadi and trusted as the first singles, he was the spearhead to avenge the 1967 defeat. He delivered perfectly by contributing two winning points in the final against Malaysia. He defeated Punch Gunalan 15–9, 15–5 and Abdul Rahman Mohamed 15–5, 15–5. Indonesia reclaimed the Cup with a resounding 7–2 score, giving Muljadi his second Thomas Cup title, his first under his new name.

The peak and final chapter of his Thomas Cup service came in 1973 in Jakarta. Still as the first singles, Muljadi again contributed two full points in the dominant 8–1 victory over Denmark. He defeated Elo Hansen in a tough three-set battle 15–6, 10–15, 15–10 and then crushed Danish legend Svend Pri 15–11, 15–1. After that 1973 final, Muljadi retired from badminton and returned to Jember.

Overall, competing as Ang Tjin Siang in 1964 and as Muljadi in 1967, 1970 and 1973, he played in four consecutive Thomas Cup finals, won three gold medals and one silver, and set a phenomenal record unmatched even by more famous teammates like Ferry Sonneville, Tan Joe Hok and Rudy Hartono. He was undefeated in singles in the final round with a perfect 6–0 record.

=== Asian Games ===
Muljadi's achievements in the Asian Games also span two editions, and again show his journey under two different names. His most brilliant moment came at the 1966 Asian Games in Bangkok, Thailand. At that time he was still competing under his birth name Ang Tjin Siang. In the men's singles event, he made history by creating an All-Indonesian final. In the final held at the Kittikachorn Stadium, he faced his compatriot Wong Pek Sen and won the gold medal after Wong Pek Sen retired with the score 5-3 in favor of Ang Tjin Siang. That gold became one of Indonesia's two golds from badminton in 1966.

In the same 1966 Games, he also competed in men's doubles paired with Tjoa Tjong Boen. They reached the final but had to settle for silver after a very tight three-set battle against the strong Malaysian pair Ng Boon Bee and Tan Yee Khan with a score of 15-12, 8-15, 16-18.

Four years later, at the 1970 Asian Games, also in Bangkok, he was already known as Muljadi. In the individual event, he again reached the men's singles final, this time against Malaysia's Punch Gunalan. After winning the first set 15-4, he lost the next two sets 3-15, 12-15 and had to settle for the silver medal. However, in the team event of the 1970 Asian Games, Muljadi got his revenge. He was part of the Indonesian men's team together with Indra Gunawan, Rudy Hartono, Indratno and Mintarja that won the gold medal.

== Achievements ==
=== Asian Games ===
Men's singles
Year	Venue	Opponent	Score	Result	Ref.
1966	Kittikachorn Stadium, Bangkok, Thailand	(Indonesia) Wong Pek Sen	5–3, retired	Gold	
1970	Kittikachorn Stadium, Bangkok, Thailand	(Malaysia) Punch Gunalan	15–4, 3–15, 12–15	Silver	

Men's doubles
Year	Venue	Partner	Opponent	Score	Result	Ref.
1966	Kittikachorn Stadium, Bangkok, Thailand	(Indonesia) Tjoa Tjong Boen	(Malaysia) Ng Boon Bee (Malaysia) Tan Yee Khan	15–12, 8–15, 16–18	Silver	

=== Asian Championships ===
Men's singles
Year	Venue	Opponent	Score	Result	Ref.
1969	Rizal Stadium, Manila, Philippines	(Malaysia) Punch Gunalan	15–11, 15–3	Gold	

=== International tournaments (5 titles, 10 runners-up) ===
Men's singles
Year	Tournament	Opponent	Score	Result	Ref.
1965	Den Haag Championships	(Indonesia) Wong Pek Sen	14–17, 9–15	(silver) Runner-up	
1966	French Open	(Denmark) Erland Kops	15–6, 6–15, 15–7	(gold) Winner	
1966	Malaysia Open	(Malaysia) Tan Aik Huang	12–15, 5–15	(silver) Runner-up	
1966	Penang Open	(Malaysia) Tan Aik Huang	5–15, 12–15	(silver) Runner-up	
1968	Northern Indian	(Indonesia) Rudy Hartono	2–15, 10–15	(silver) Runner-up	
1969	Singapore Pesta	(Malaysia) Tan Aik Mong	18–13, 15–4	(gold) Winner	
1969	U.S. Open	(Indonesia) Rudy Hartono	9–15, 12–15	(silver) Runner-up	
1969	Singapore Open	(Indonesia) Rudy Hartono	7–15, 4–15	(silver) Runner-up	
1970	Singapore Open	(Indonesia) Darmawan	18–16, 15–8	(gold) Winner	
1971	Western Indian	(Indonesia) Rudy Hartono	11–15, 12–15	(silver) Runner-up	
1971	All England	(Indonesia) Rudy Hartono	1–15, 5–15	(silver) Runner-up	
1971	U.S. Open	(Indonesia) Rudy Hartono	15–8, 15–9	(gold) Winner	

Men's doubles
Year	Tournament	Partner	Opponent	Score	Result	Ref.
1966	French Open	(Indonesia) Wong Pek Sen	(England) J. T. Woolhouse (England) Lance Ellwood	15–8, 15–6	(gold) Winner	
1966	Penang Open	(Indonesia) Rudy Nio	(Malaysia) Teh Kew San (Malaysia) Yew Cheng Hoe	0–15, 0–15	(silver) Runner-up	
1971	Western Indian	(Indonesia) Sumiratta	(Indonesia) Rudy Hartono (Indonesia) Indra Gunawan	13–18, 12–15	(silver) Runner-up	

=== GANEFO ===
Men's singles
Year	Venue	Opponent	Score	Result	Ref.
1963	Istora Senayan, Jakarta, Indonesia	(China) Zhang Zhucheng		Bronze	
