= Ng Tat Wai =

Malaysian badminton player (born 1947)

Ng Tat Wai 吴达伟
Personal information
- Born: 5 September 1947 (age 79) Penang, Malayan Union
- Height: 1.70 m (5 ft 7 in)

Sport
- Country: Malaysia
- Sport: Badminton
- Handedness: Right
- Event: Men's doubles
Medal record
Men's badminton
Representing Malaysia
Thomas Cup
Silver medal – second place	1970 Kuala Lumpur	Men's team
Commonwealth Games
Silver medal – second place	1970 Edinburgh	Men's doubles
Asian Games
Bronze medal – third place	1970 Bangkok	Men's team
Asian Championships
Silver medal – second place	1971 Jakarta	Men's team
Southeast Asian Games
Gold medal – first place	1971 Kuala Lumpur	Mixed doubles
Gold medal – first place	1971 Kuala Lumpur	Men's team

Ng Tat Wai

Chinese name
- Traditional Chinese: 吳達偉
- Hanyu Pinyin: Wú Dá Wěi
- Jyutping: Ng4 Daat6 Wai5
- Hokkien POJ: Gô͘ Ta̍t-úi
- Tâi-lô: Gôo Ta̍t-uí

Ng Tat Wai (born 5 September 1947) was one of the top badminton players during the 1970s.

== Career ==
A right-handed doubles player, Tat Wai had represented and won medals for Malaysia in various tournaments including the Thomas Cup, Commonwealth Games, Asian Games and Southeast Asian Games. During his student years in England, Tat Wai played and won several County open tournaments.

Currently Tat Wai stays in Penang and devotes his time to training.

== Achievements ==
=== Southeast Asian Peninsular Games ===
Men's doubles
Year	Venue	Partner	Opponent	Score	Result
1971	Stadium Negara; Kuala Lumpur, Malaysia	(Malaysia) Ho Khim Kooi	(Malaysia) Ng Boon Bee (Malaysia) Punch Gunalan	10–15, 10–15	Silver

Mixed doubles
Year	Venue	Partner	Opponent	Score	Result
1971	Stadium Negara; Kuala Lumpur, Malaysia	(Malaysia) Teh Mei Ling	(Malaysia) Ng Boon Bee (Malaysia) Rosalind Singha Ang	walkover	Gold

=== Commonwealth Games ===
Men's doubles
Year	Venue	Partner	Opponent	Score	Result
1970	Edinburgh, Scotland	(Malaysia) Tan Soon Hoi	(Malaysia) Ng Boon Bee (Malaysia) Punch Gunalan	3–15, 3–15	Silver

=== International tournament ===
Men's doubles
Year	Tournament	Partner	Opponent	Score	Result
1972	Poona Open	(Malaysia) Abdul Rahman Mohamad	(Malaysia) Ng Boon Bee (Malaysia) Punch Gunalan	15–10, 8–15, 8–15	(silver) Runner-up
