= Malaysia at the 1971 SEAP Games =

Malaysia at the 1971 Southeast Asian Peninsular Games
- IOC code: MAS
- NOC: Olympic Council of Malaysia
- Website: www.olympic.org.my (in English)

in Kuala Lumpur
- Competitors: 299 in 14 sports
- Medals Ranked 2nd: Gold 41 Silver 43 Bronze 55 Total 139

Southeast Asian Peninsular Games appearances
- 1959; 1961; 1965; 1967; 1969; 1971; 1973; 1975; 1977; 1979; 1981; 1983; 1985; 1987; 1989; 1991; 1993; 1995; 1997; 1999; 2001; 2003; 2005; 2007; 2009; 2011; 2013; 2015; 2017; 2019; 2021; 2023; 2025; 2027; 2029

Malaysia competed in the 1971 Southeast Asian Peninsular Games as the host nation in Kuala Lumpur from 6 to 13 December 1971. It won 41 gold, 43 silver and 55 bronze medals.

== Medal summary ==
=== Medals by sport ===
Sport	Gold	Silver	Bronze	Total	Rank
Athletics	14	6	8	28	1
Badminton	5	5	1	11	1
Basketball	0	1	0	1	2
Boxing	1	0	0	1	
Cycling	3	1	1	5	
Diving	1	0	0	1	
Field hockey	1	0	0	1	1
Football	0	1	0	1	2
Shooting	1	1	5	7	
Swimming	1	2	8	11	
Table tennis	0	0	2	2	3
Water polo	0	1	0	1	2
Weightlifting	0	0	2	2	
Total	41	43	55	139	2

=== Medallists ===
Medal	Name	Sport	Event
Gold	Thambu Krishnan	Athletics	Men's 400 metres
Gold	Ramasamy Subramaniam	Athletics	Men's 800 metres
Gold	Ishtiaq Mubarak	Athletics	Men's 110 metres hurdles
Gold	Muthiah Dattaya	Athletics	Men's hammer throw
Gold	Nashatar Singh Sidhu	Athletics	Men's javelin throw
Gold	Khoo Chong Beng	Athletics	Men's 20 kilometres road walk
Gold	Abdul Aziz Khalil	Athletics	Men's 50 kilometres road walk
Gold	A.S. Nathan Ramasamy Subramaniam Thambu Krishnan S. Sivaraman	Athletics	Men's 4 × 400 metres relay
Gold	Junaidah Aman	Athletics	Women's 400 metres
Gold	Chong Soo Luan	Athletics	Women's 200 metres hurdles
Gold	Mona Chin	Athletics	Women's long jump
Gold	Paramasiva Savithri	Athletics	Women's heptathlon
Gold	Yamuna Nair; Junaidah Aman; Fazillah Ahmad; Noreen Pereira	Athletics	Women's 4 × 100 metres relay
Gold		Athletics	Women's 4 × 400 metres relay
Gold	Tan Aik Huang	Badminton	Men's singles
Gold	Rosalind Singha Ang	Badminton	Women's singles
Gold	Ng Boon Bee; Punch Gunalan	Badminton	Men's doubles
Gold	Ng Tat Wai; Teh Mei Ling	Badminton	Mixed doubles
Gold	Malaysia national badminton team: Ng Boon Bee; Punch Gunalan; Ng Tat Wai; Ho Khim Kooi; Tan Aik Huang; Abdul Rahman Mohamad	Badminton	Men's team
Gold	Daud Ibrahim	Cycling	Men's 1000 metre individual time trial
Gold	Daud Ibrahim; Fadzil Ibrahim; Rahim Baharuddin; Kamarudeen Ali	Cycling	Men's 1600 metre team time trial
Gold		Cycling	Men's 4000 metre team pursuit
Gold	Chan Wee Keong	Diving	Men's springboard
Gold	Malaysia men's national field hockey team	Field hockey	Men's tournament
Gold	Ally Ong	Shooting	Men's skeet individual
Gold	Wong Mei Lin	Swimming	Women's 200 metre individual medley
Gold	Nordin Hamzah	Boxing	Men's light middleweight
Silver	Thomboo Krishnan	Athletics	Men's 200 metres
Silver	P. Palanisamy	Athletics	Men's 1500 metres
Silver	Bala Ditta	Athletics	Men's 110 metres hurdles
Silver	Vijayan Janarthan	Athletics	Men's decathlon
Silver	Fazillah Ahmad	Athletics	Women's 100 metres
Silver	Junaidah Aman	Athletics	Women's 200 metres
Silver	Punch Gunalan	Badminton	Men's singles
Silver	Ng Tat Wai; Ho Khim Kooi	Badminton	Men's doubles
Silver	Rosalind Singha Ang; Teoh Siew Yong	Badminton	Women's doubles
Silver	Ng Boon Bee; Rosalind Singha Ang	Badminton	Mixed doubles
Silver	Malaysia national badminton team: Teh Mei Ling; Teoh Siew Yong; Rosalind Singha Ang; Sylvia Tan	Badminton	Women's team
Silver	Malaysia national basketball team	Basketball	Women's tournament
Silver		Cycling	Men's 200 kilometre massed start team
Silver	Malaysia national football team	Football	Men's tournament
Silver		Shooting	Men's skeet team
Silver	Chiang Jin Choon	Swimming	Men's 400 metre individual medley
Silver	Ong Mei Lin	Swimming	Women's 200 metre backstroke
Silver	Malaysia national water polo team	Water polo	Men's tournament
Bronze	Peter Govind	Athletics	Men's 1500 metres
Bronze	M. Arumugam	Athletics	Men's 5000 metres
Bronze	Chin Wan Loy	Athletics	Men's long jump
Bronze	Kamal Din	Athletics	Men's discus throw
Bronze	Zambrose Abdul Rahman	Athletics	Men's decathlon
Bronze	Thor Gim Soon; Poopathy; Zainuddin Wahab; Thomboo Krishnan	Athletics	Men's 4 × 100 metre relay
Bronze	Fazillah Ahmad	Athletics	Women's 200 metres
Bronze	Vijaya Kumari	Athletics	Women's 800 metres
Bronze	Silvia Tan; Teh Mei Ling	Badminton	Women's doubles
Bronze	Omar Saad	Cycling	Men's 200 kilometre massed start team
Bronze		Shooting	Men's small bore rifle prone individual
Bronze		Shooting	Men's small bore rifle prone team
Bronze	Mohd Jaafar	Shooting	Men's air rifle
Bronze	Loke Tat Chew	Shooting	Men's 25 metre rapid fire pistol individual
Bronze		Shooting	Men's 25 metre rapid fire pistol team
Bronze	Liew Chuan Wai	Swimming	Men's 400 metre freestyle
Bronze	Chiang Jin Choon	Swimming	Men's 100 metre backstroke
Bronze		Swimming	Men's 4 × 200 metre freestyle relay
Bronze		Swimming	Men's 4 × 100 metre medley relay
Bronze	Lam Po Leng	Swimming	Women's 200 metre backstroke
Bronze	Lim Ai Leng	Swimming	Women's 200 metre breaststroke
Bronze	Jean de Bruyne	Swimming	Women's 200 metre butterfly
Bronze		Swimming	Women's 4 × 100 metre freestyle relay
Bronze	Soong Poh Wah	Table tennis	Men's singles
Bronze	Peong Tah Seng; Yong Ng Loong	Table tennis	Men's doubles
Bronze	Leong Ah Wah	Weightlifting	Men's bantamweight
Bronze	Yan Chee	Weightlifting	Men's featherweight
