= 1969 Asian Badminton Championships =

Badminton championships

Tournament information
- Location: Manila, Philippines
- Date: 3–15 February, 1969

The 1969 Asian Badminton Championships took place from 3–15 February 1969, in Manila, Philippines. Indonesia won the men's team competition after beating Malaysia 3–2 in the final. The match for third place between Japan and Philippines also ended 3–2.

== Medalists ==
| Discipline | Gold | Silver | Bronze |
|---|---|---|---|
| Men's singles | (Indonesia) Muljadi | (Malaysia) Punch Gunalan | (India) Dinesh Khanna |
| Men's singles | (Indonesia) Muljadi | (Malaysia) Punch Gunalan | (Thailand) Sangob Rattanusorn |
| Women's singles | (Hong Kong) Pang Yuet Mui | (Myanmar) Ma Than Ngwe | (South Korea) Lee Young-soon |
| Women's singles | (Hong Kong) Pang Yuet Mui | (Myanmar) Ma Than Ngwe | (Philippines) Mary Tan |
| Men's doubles | (Malaysia) Ng Boon Bee (Malaysia) Punch Gunalan | (Japan) Ippei Kojima (Japan) Yukinori Hori | (Thailand) Chavalert Chumkum (Thailand) Sangob Rattanusorn |
| Men's doubles | (Malaysia) Ng Boon Bee (Malaysia) Punch Gunalan | (Japan) Ippei Kojima (Japan) Yukinori Hori | (Philippines) Sy Khim Piao (Philippines) Armando Yanga |
| Women's doubles | (South Korea) Lee Young-soon (South Korea) Kang Young-sin | (Hong Kong) Pang Yuet Mui (Hong Kong) Cynder Ho | (Philippines) Lily Tan (Philippines) Mary Tan |
| Women's doubles | (South Korea) Lee Young-soon (South Korea) Kang Young-sin | (Hong Kong) Pang Yuet Mui (Hong Kong) Cynder Ho | (Myanmar) Ma Than Ngwe (Myanmar) Khin Hyin (Note: refer to 킹후인 Donga Ilbo 1969-2-15 page 8) |
| Men's team | Indonesia; Muljadi; Darmadi; Indratno; Mintarja | Malaysia; Tan Aik Mong; Ng Boon Bee; Punch Gunalan; Tan Aik Huang | Japan; Ippei Kojima; Yukinori Hori; Masao Akiyama |

== Medal table ==
| Rank | Nation | Gold | Silver | Bronze | Total |
|---|---|---|---|---|---|
| 1 | Indonesia | 2 | 0 | 0 | 2 |
| 2 | Malaysia | 1 | 2 | 0 | 3 |
| 3 | Hong Kong | 1 | 1 | 0 | 2 |
| 4 | South Korea | 1 | 0 | 1 | 2 |
| 5 | Japan | 0 | 1 | 1 | 2 |
| 5 | Myanmar | 0 | 1 | 1 | 2 |
| 7 | Philippines | 0 | 0 | 3 | 3 |
| 8 | Thailand | 0 | 0 | 2 | 2 |
| 9 | India | 0 | 0 | 1 | 1 |
| Totals (9 entries) | | 5 | 5 | 9 | 19 |

== Men's singles ==
=== Finals ===
Semi-finals
(India) Dinesh Khanna | 7 | 13
(Malaysia) Punch Gunalan | 15 | 18
(Indonesia) Muljadi | 15 | 15
(Thailand) Sangob Rattanusorn | 10 | 3

Final
(Malaysia) Punch Gunalan | 11 | 3
(Indonesia) Muljadi | 15 | 15

=== Top half ===
==== Section 1 ====
First round
(South Vietnam) Âu T Đ | 15 | 15
(Philippines) V Oreta | 10 | 14
(Dominion of Ceylon) S Chandrasena | 15 | 15
(Hong Kong) R Young | 3 | 1
(Laos) S Thao | 11 | 18 | 15
(Philippines) R Gutierrez | 15 | 17 | 10
(Pakistan) N Mohsin | 15 | 15
(Taiwan) Ho W-m | 3 | 11
(Japan) Y Hori | 15 | 15
(Philippines) P Yuson | 4 | 2

Second round
(India) D Khanna | 15 | 15
(South Vietnam) Âu T Đ | 0 | 3
(Dominion of Ceylon) S Chandrasena | 15 | 6
(Laos) S Thao | 17 | 15
(Malaysia) Tan A M | 15 | 15
(Pakistan) N Mohsin | 12 | 8
(Japan) Y Hori | w | / | o
(Indonesia) Darmadi

Third round
(India) D Khanna | 15 | 18
(Laos) S Thao | 5 | 15
(Malaysia) Tan A M | 15 | 15
(Japan) Y Hori | 9 | 5

Quarter-finals
(India) D Khanna | 12 | 18 | 18
(Malaysia) Tan A M | 15 | 15 | 15

==== Section 2 ====
First round
(India) S Bhatia | 15 | 14 | 15
(Hong Kong) Koo M F | 12 | 17 | 12
(Philippines) C Co | w | / | o
(Dominion of Ceylon) A Perera
(South Vietnam) Lâm T | 17 | 15
(Hong Kong) Ma K S | 16 | 9
(Thailand) S Boonyasukhanonda | 15 | 15
(Taiwan) Eow C-l | 2 | 2
(Philippines) D Valerio | w | / | o
(Laos) B Siaksone

Second round
(Indonesia) Mintarja
(India) S Bhatia | w | / | o
(Philippines) C Co | 15 | 15
(South Vietnam) Lâm T | 12 | 8
(Thailand) S Boonyasukhanonda | w | / | o
(Japan) M Akiyama
(Philippines) D Valerio | 3 | 1
(Malaysia) P Gunalan | 15 | 15

Third round
(India) S Bhatia | 15 | 15
(Philippines) C Co | 6 | 8
(Thailand) S Boonyasukhanonda | 2 | 15 | 8
(Malaysia) P Gunalan | 15 | 11 | 15

Quarter-finals
(India) S Bhatia | 5 | 10
(Malaysia) P Gunalan | 15 | 15

=== Bottom half ===
==== Section 3 ====
First round
(Pakistan) K Salahuddin | 15 | 15
(Dominion of Ceylon) G Chandrasena | 7 | 7
(Myanmar) S Myint | 15 | 15
(Philippines) R Navarro | 2 | 4
(Hong Kong) Cheng K C | 2 | 8
(Thailand) S Boonyasukhanonda | 15 | 15
(Dominion of Ceylon) L R Ariyananda | 15 | 15
(Laos) C Outhabong | 11 | 11
(Taiwan) Huang L-e | 15 | 15
(South Vietnam) Âu Đ M | 6 | 3

Second round
(Japan) I Kojima | 15 | 15
(Pakistan) K Salahuddin | 9 | 3
(Indonesia) Muljadi | 15 | 15
(Myanmar) S Myint | 12 | 2
(Philippines) A Yanga | 17 | 15
(Dominion of Ceylon) L R Ariyananda | 15 | 6
(Taiwan) Huang L-e | w | / | o
(Malaysia) Tan A H

Third round
(Japan) I Kojima | 15 | 5 | 6
(Indonesia) Muljadi | 6 | 15 | 15
(Philippines) A Yanga | 15 | 6 | 10
(Taiwan) Huang L-e | 12 | 15 | 15

Quarter-finals
(Indonesia) Muljadi | 15 | 15
(Taiwan) Huang L-e | 3 | 2

==== Section 4 ====
First round
(Myanmar) K Nyunt | 15 | 15
(Pakistan) F Haq | 10 | 8
(Malaysia) Abdul Rahman M | w | / | o
(South Korea) Kim B-s
(Hong Kong) Tsoi F | 17 | 15
(Philippines) D Pascual | 15 | 5
(Hong Kong) Chu S W | w | / | o
(Dominion of Ceylon) A Dickson
(India) R Ghosh | 15 | 15
(Laos) S Thammavongsa | 2 | 1

Second round
(Indonesia) Indratno | 15 | 18
(Myanmar) K Nyunt | 10 | 13
(Malaysia) Abdul Rahman M | 15 | 15
(Hong Kong) Tsoi F | 7 | 2
(Philippines) D So | 15 | 15
(Hong Kong) Chu S W | 10 | 7
(India) R Ghosh | 15 | 5 | 3
(Thailand) S Rattanusorn | 5 | 15 | 15

Third round
(Indonesia) Indratno | 15 | 11 | 15
(Malaysia) Abdul Rahman M | 11 | 15 | 10
(Philippines) D So | 7 | 3
(Thailand) S Rattanusorn | 15 | 15

Quarter-finals
(Indonesia) Indratno
(Thailand) S Rattanusorn | w | / | o

== Women's singles ==
=== Finals ===
Round of 16
(South Korea) Lee Young-soon | w | / | o
(Dominion of Ceylon) Namal de Silva
(Taiwan) Lee Yu-mei | 11 | 2
(Myanmar) Khin Hyin | 12 | 11
(Hong Kong) Pang Yuet Mui | 11 | 11
(Philippines) Helen Uy | 0 | 0
(South Korea) Kang Young-sin | w | / | o
(Hong Kong) Cynder Ho

Quarter-finals
(Indonesia) Minarni
(South Korea) Lee Young-soon | w | / | o
(Myanmar) Khin Hyin | 0 | 0
(Hong Kong) Pang Yuet Mui | 11 | 11
(Myanmar) Ma Than Ngwe | 11 | 11
(Taiwan) Yu Yu-e | 6 | 2
(South Korea) Kang Young-sin | 6 | 9
(Philippines) Mary Tan | 11 | 11

Semi-finals
(South Korea) Lee Young-soon | 4 | 6
(Hong Kong) Pang Yuet Mui | 11 | 11
(Myanmar) Ma Than Ngwe | 11 | 11
(Philippines) Mary Tan | 7 | 1

Final
(Hong Kong) Pang Yuet Mui | 11 | 11
(Myanmar) Ma Than Ngwe | 0 | 0

== Men's doubles ==
=== Finals ===
Semi-finals
(Malaysia) Punch Gunalan (Malaysia) Ng Boon Bee | 15 | 15
(Thailand) Chavalert Chumkum (Thailand) Sangob Rattanusorn | 7 | 3
(Philippines) Sy Khim Piao (Philippines) Armando Yanga | 2 | 4
(Japan) Yukinori Hori (Japan) Ippei Kojima | 15 | 15

Final
(Malaysia) Punch Gunalan (Malaysia) Ng Boon Bee | 15 | 5 | 15
(Japan) Yukinori Hori (Japan) Ippei Kojima | 8 | 15 | 11

=== Top half ===
==== Section 1 ====
First round
(Malaysia) P Gunalan (Malaysia) Ng B B | 15 | 15
(Philippines) D Valerio (Philippines) P Yuson | 12 | 7
(Philippines) R Gutierrez (Philippines) O Yanga | 17 | 15
(Dominion of Ceylon) G Chandrasena (Dominion of Ceylon) S Chandrasena | 14 | 11
(Hong Kong) Koo M F (Hong Kong) Tsoi F | 15 | 17
(South Vietnam) Âu T Đ (South Vietnam) Nguyễn K P | 8 | 14

Second round
(Malaysia) P Gunalan (Malaysia) Ng B B | 15 | 15
(Philippines) R Gutierrez (Philippines) O Yanga | 4 | 6
(Indonesia) Indratno (Indonesia) Mintarja | w | / | o
(Hong Kong) Koo M F (Hong Kong) Tsoi F

Quarter-finals
(Malaysia) P Gunalan (Malaysia) Ng B B | 15 | 15
(Indonesia) Indratno (Indonesia) Mintarja | 8 | 13

==== Section 2 ====
First round
(Pakistan) N Mohsin (Pakistan) K Salahuddin | 18 | 9 | 15
(Myanmar) S Maung (Myanmar) W Nyunt | 17 | 15 | 7
(Philippines) C Co (Philippines) D So | 15 | 17
(Hong Kong) Cheng K C (Hong Kong) Chu S W | 10 | 14

Second round
(Thailand) C Chumkum (Thailand) S Rattanusorn | 15 | 15
(Pakistan) N Mohsin (Pakistan) K Salahuddin | 6 | 3
(Taiwan) Ho W-m (Taiwan) Shao P-h | 6 | 9
(Philippines) C Co (Philippines) D So | 15 | 15

Quarter-finals
(Thailand) C Chumkum (Thailand) S Rattanusorn | 15 | 13 | 15
(Philippines) C Co (Philippines) D So | 13 | 18 | 2

=== Bottom half ===
==== Section 3 ====
First round
(Taiwan) Eow C-l (Taiwan) Huang L-e | 15 | 15
(Hong Kong) Ma K S (Hong Kong) R Young | 4 | 2
(Laos) B Siaksone (Laos) S Thao
(Dominion of Ceylon) L R Ariyananda (Dominion of Ceylon) A Perera | w | / | o

Second round
(Taiwan) Eow C-l (Taiwan) Huang L-e | w | / | o
(Malaysia) Tan A H (Malaysia) Tan A M
(Dominion of Ceylon) L R Ariyananda (Dominion of Ceylon) A Perera
(Philippines) Sy K P (Philippines) A Yanga | w | / | o

Quarter-finals
(Taiwan) Eow C-l (Taiwan) Huang L-e | 12 | 17 | 5
(Philippines) Sy K P (Philippines) A Yanga | 15 | 14 | 15

==== Section 4 ====
First round
(Myanmar) S Myint (Myanmar) K Nyunt | 15 | 15
(Philippines) R Navarro (Philippines) D Pascual | 6 | 10
(India) S Bhatia (India) R Ghosh | 15 | 9 | 15
(Laos) C Outhabong (Laos) S Thammavongsa | 11 | 15 | 12
(Philippines) V Oreta (Philippines) A Uy | w | / | o
(Indonesia) Darmadi (Indonesia) Muljadi

Second round
(Myanmar) S Myint (Myanmar) K Nyunt | 2 | 9
(Japan) Y Hori (Japan) I Kojima | 15 | 15
(India) S Bhatia (India) R Ghosh | 15 | 15
(Philippines) V Oreta (Philippines) A Uy | 8 | 2

Quarter-finals
(Japan) Y Hori (Japan) I Kojima | 15 | 15
(India) S Bhatia (India) R Ghosh | 9 | 8

== Women's doubles ==
=== Finals ===
Quarter-finals
(Philippines) Lily Tan (Philippines) Mary Tan | 15 | 15
(South Korea) Son Deok-suk (South Korea) Yoon Im-soon | 7 | 13
(South Korea) Kang Young-sin (South Korea) Lee Young-soon | 15 | 15
(Taiwan) Lee Yu-mei (Taiwan) Yu Yu-e | 0 | 6
(Myanmar) Khin Hyin (Myanmar) Ma Than Ngwe | w | / | o
(Dominion of Ceylon) Namal de Silva (Dominion of Ceylon) Shirani Perera
(South Korea) Bae Hyo-ryeon (South Korea) Han Sook-ee | 6 | 15 | 6
(Hong Kong) Cynder Ho (Hong Kong) Pang Yuet Mui | 15 | 7 | 15

Semi-finals
(Philippines) Lily Tan (Philippines) Mary Tan | 9 | 12
(South Korea) Kang Young-sin (South Korea) Lee Young-soon | 15 | 15
(Myanmar) Khin Hyin (Myanmar) Ma Than Ngwe | 3 | 0
(Hong Kong) Cynder Ho (Hong Kong) Pang Yuet Mui | 15 | 15

Final
(South Korea) Kang Young-sin (South Korea) Lee Young-soon | 15 | 15
(Hong Kong) Cynder Ho (Hong Kong) Pang Yuet Mui | 8 | 5
