= Nhất Nam =

Vietnamese martial art

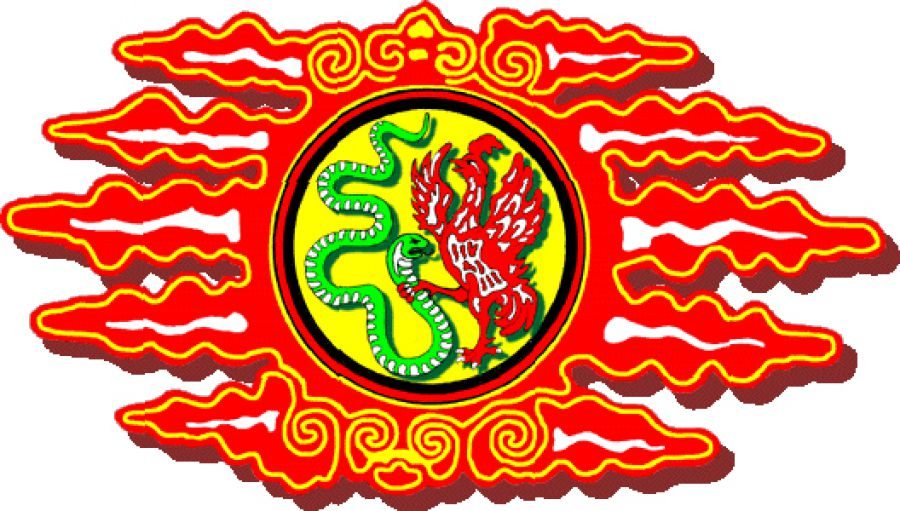
Logo of Nhất Nam

Nhất Nam (Chữ Hán: 一南) is a martial art originating from Vietnam, formalised in Hanoi from 1983 onwards by Ngô Xuân Bính.

The name Nhất Nam derives from Sino-Vietnamese characters from "One South" (一南), and is to be distinguished from Nhật Nam ("Sun South" 日南), the Vietnamese name for the ancient Chinese Rinan Han commandery in northern Vietnam. The "One" expresses the "unification" of features of Vietnamese martial arts. Ngô Xuân Bính formalised these features in his book on the basics of this unified approach in “Nhất Nam căn bản” Volumes 1 and 2, ("Basic Nhất Nam," căn bản means "basic.")

According to the English Nhất-Nam Federation's website "Nhất-Nam was mentioned for the first time in sources dating from the thirteenth and fourteenth centuries." However Vietnamese sources generally refer that the techniques were recorded centuries earlier, but the specific "One-Nam" name dates the art to 1983.

Nhất Nam was established in Russia in the 1990s and is also practised in Lithuania, Belarus, Ukraine, Switzerland, and the UK.

Nhất Nam is mentioned in the novel The Zenith (set in the final months of Ho Chi Minh's life) by Vietnamese author Duong Thu Huong.
