= Conrado Co =

Filipino badminton player and official

Personal information
- Born: 1940 (age 85–86)

Sport
- Country: Philippines
- Sport: Badminton

Conrado Co is a former Filipino badminton player and currently a ranking official working at the Philippine Badminton Association.

== Early life ==
Co came from a big family of eight children. He first took badminton at age 14, the only one to show interest in the sport among his siblings.

== Career ==
During the early 1960s, Conrado Co travelled to Hong Kong with his trainer Sy Khim Piao to watch his favorite players in an international tournament. Later Co, decided to play competitive badminton and played doubles with his trainer-coach Sy at the 1963 Hong Kong Open Badminton Championship.

Co later went on to win more tournaments. He won 18 national titles, won the singles at the 1963 National Open, won both the singles of the 1963 and 1965 edition of the All-Filipino Metropolitan Open and won 14 in doubles with three different partners in 1964 and 1969. and 14. Conrado Co won doubles champion with partners Sy Khim Piao, Dany So and Armando Yanga.

Co was also part of the Philippine national badminton team that won the team event in the 1977 South Vietnam Invitational tournament and a member of the national team at the 1962, 1966 and 1974 Asian Games. Co also won the 1967 Taipei Open doubles tournament.

Co was also part of the Philippine national badminton team that participated at the 1963, 1965, 1967 and 1969 Asian Badminton Championship. His best result was reaching the quarter-finals with Daniel So at the 1969 Asian Badminton Championships.

After his retirement as a player in competitive badminton, Co became a ranking official for the Philippine Badminton Association.

== Personal life ==
Conrado Co married Pacita Uy, who was 1972 Miss Freshman of the UST College of Commerce. Pacita is also a badminton player and has played in competitive badminton winning at a doubles event in 1983 in a non-ranking national tournament. Conrado and Pacita have three children named Karen, Joseph Ryan and Theodore who are all badminton players.

== Achievements ==
=== International tournaments ===
Men's doubles

Year	Tournament	Partner	Opponent	Score	Result
1969	Taipei Championships	(Philippines) Daniel So			(gold) Winner
1970	Taipei Championships	(Philippines) Daniel So			(gold) Winner
