= 2002 Uber Cup knockout stage =

2002 Knockout stage of the Uber Cup badminton team championship

The knockout stage for the 2002 Uber Cup in Guangzhou began on 15 May 2002 with the semi-finals and ended on 18 May 2002 with the final.

== Qualified teams ==
The top two placed teams from each of the two groups qualified for this stage.

Group	Winners	Runners-up
A	Netherlands	Hong Kong
B	China	South Korea

== Bracket ==
Semi-finals
Netherlands	2
South Korea	3
Hong Kong	0
China	3

Final
South Korea	1
China	3

== Semi-finals ==
=== Semi-final 1 ===
South Korea
3
Tianhe Sports Center
15 May 2002, 19:30 UTC+8

Netherlands
2

			1	2	3	4	5
1	(South Korea) (Netherlands)	Kim Kyung-ran; Mia Audina	7; 4	7; 5	3; 7	0; 7	0; 7
2	(South Korea) (Netherlands)	Lee Kyung-won; Judith Meulendijks	7; 2	2; 7	7; 2	7; 3
3	(South Korea) (Netherlands)	Kim Kyung-ran / Ra Kyung-min; Mia Audina / Lotte Jonathans	3; 7	5; 7	8; 6	5; 7
4	(South Korea) (Netherlands)	Kwon Hee-sook; Brenda Beenhakker	7; 5	7; 4	4; 7	7; 3
5	(South Korea) (Netherlands)	Hwang Yu-mi / Lee Hyo-jung; Karina de Wit / Judith Meulendijks	7; 5	7; 0	8; 6

=== Semi-final 2 ===
China
3
Tianhe Sports Center
15 May 2002, 19:30 UTC+8

Hong Kong
0

			1	2	3	4	5
1	(China) (Hong Kong)	Zhou Mi; Wang Chen	7; 0	7; 2	7; 5
2	(China) (Hong Kong)	Gong Ruina; Ling Wan Ting	7; 0	7; 0	4; 7	7; 1
3	(China) (Hong Kong)	Dai Yun; Koon Wai Chee	7; 2	7; 0	7; 2
4	(China) (Hong Kong)	Gao Ling / Huang Sui; Li Wing Mui / Ling Wan Ting						not played
5	(China) (Hong Kong)	Huang Nanyan / Yang Wei; Koon Wai Chee / Wang Chen						not played

== Final ==
China
3
Tianhe Sports Center
18 May 2002, 13:30 UTC+8

South Korea
1

			1	2	3	4	5
1	(China) (South Korea)	Zhou Mi; Kim Kyung-ran	4; 7	3; 7	7; 3	7; 3	5; 7
2	(China) (South Korea)	Gao Ling / Huang Sui; Lee Kyung-won / Ra Kyung-min	7; 4	2; 7	7; 2	5; 7	7; 1
3	(China) (South Korea)	Gong Ruina; Kwon Hee-sook	7; 3	7; 4	5; 7	7; 3
4	(China) (South Korea)	Huang Nanyan / Yang Wei; Hwang Yu-mi / Lee Hyo-jung	7; 0	7; 2	7; 3
5	(China) (South Korea)	Dai Yun; Lee Jong-boon						not played
