= 2002 Thomas Cup knockout stage =

2002 Knockout stage of the Thomas Cup badminton team championship

The knockout stage for the 2002 Thomas Cup in Guangzhou began on 16 May 2002 with the semi-finals and ended on 19 May 2002 with the final.

== Qualified teams ==
The top two placed teams from each of the two groups qualified for this stage.

Group	Winners	Runners-up
A	China	Denmark
B	Indonesia	Malaysia

== Bracket ==
Semi-finals
China	1
Malaysia	3
Denmark	0
Indonesia	3

Final
Malaysia	2
Indonesia	3

== Semi-finals ==
=== Semi-final 1 ===
China
1
Tianhe Sports Center
16 May 2002, 19:30 UTC+8

Malaysia
3

			1	2	3	4	5
1	(China) (Malaysia)	Xia Xuanze; Wong Choong Hann	6; 8	8; 6	7; 5	8; 6
2	(China) (Malaysia)	Bao Chunlai; Muhammad Hafiz Hashim	7; 1	4; 7	5; 7	7; 1	5; 7
3	(China) (Malaysia)	Chen Qiqiu / Zhang Wei; Choong Tan Fook / Lee Wan Wah	7; 1	8; 6	1; 7	3; 7	3; 7
4	(China) (Malaysia)	Wang Wei / Zhang Jun; Chan Chong Ming / Chew Choon Eng	4; 7	5; 7	2; 7
5	(China) (Malaysia)	Lin Dan; Lee Tsuen Seng						not played

=== Semi-final 2 ===
Indonesia
3
Tianhe Sports Center
17 May 2002, 19:30 UTC+8

Denmark
0

			1	2	3	4	5
1	(Indonesia) (Denmark)	Marleve Mainaky; Kenneth Jonassen	3; 7	6; 8	7; 5	7; 0	7; 2
2	(Indonesia) (Denmark)	Sigit Budiarto / Candra Wijaya; Jens Eriksen / Martin Lundgaard Hansen	7; 1	7; 2	6; 8	7; 4
3	(Indonesia) (Denmark)	Taufik Hidayat; Anders Boesen	6; 8	3; 7	7; 5	7; 3	7; 1
4	(Indonesia) (Denmark)	Halim Haryanto / Tri Kusharyanto; Lars Paaske / Jonas Rasmussen						not played
5	(Indonesia) (Denmark)	Hendrawan; Peter Rasmussen						not played

== Final ==
Indonesia
3
Tianhe Sports Center
19 May 2002, 13:30 UTC+8

Malaysia
2

			1	2	3	4	5
1	(Indonesia) (Malaysia)	Marleve Mainaky; Wong Choong Hann	5; 7	5; 7	1; 7
2	(Indonesia) (Malaysia)	Sigit Budiarto / Candra Wijaya; Chan Chong Ming / Chew Choon Eng	7; 3	7; 4	7; 2
3	(Indonesia) (Malaysia)	Taufik Hidayat; Lee Tsuen Seng	7; 1	5; 7	2; 7	7; 2	3; 7
4	(Indonesia) (Malaysia)	Halim Haryanto / Tri Kusharyanto; Choong Tan Fook / Lee Wan Wah	8; 7	7; 8	7; 1	7; 3
5	(Indonesia) (Malaysia)	Hendrawan; Roslin Hashim	8; 7	7; 2	7; 1
