= 2002 Uber Cup group stage =

Badminton team Tournament in Kuala Lumpur

The 2002 Uber Cup group stage was held at Tianhe Sports Center in Guangzhou, China, from 9 to 13 May 2002.

The group stage was first stage of the tournament where only the two highest-placing teams in each of the two groups advanced to the knockout stage.

== Draw ==
The original draw for the tournament was conducted on 2 April 2002. The 8 teams will be drawn into two groups each containing four teams.

=== Group composition ===
Group
Group A	Group B
Denmark; Hong Kong; Indonesia; Netherlands	China (Host); Germany; Japan; South Korea

== Group A ==
Pos	Team	Pld	W	L	GF	GA	GD	PF	PA	PD	Pts	Qualification
1	Netherlands	3	3	0	30	25	+5	289	267	+22	3	Advance to semi-finals
2	Hong Kong	3	2	1	26	30	−4	286	297	−11	2	Advance to semi-finals
3	Indonesia	3	1	2	32	26	+6	293	320	−27	1	
4	Denmark	3	0	3	24	31	−7	286	270	+16	0	

Source: BadmintonCN

=== Denmark vs Netherlands ===
Denmark
2
Tianhe Sports Center
9 May 2002, 19:30 UTC+8

Netherlands
3

			1	2	3	4	5
1	(Denmark) (Netherlands)	Camilla Martin; Mia Audina	7; 2	7; 2	7; 4
2	(Denmark) (Netherlands)	Tine Rasmussen; Judith Meulendijks	5; 7	5; 7	5; 7
3	(Denmark) (Netherlands)	Anne Marie Pedersen; Brenda Beenhakker	2; 7	2; 7	1; 7
4	(Denmark) (Netherlands)	Pernille Harder / Mette Schjoldager; Mia Audina / Lotte Jonathans	7; 2	7; 1	7; 0
5	(Denmark) (Netherlands)	Jane Bramsen / Ann-Lou Jørgensen; Karina de Wit / Lonneke Janssen	5; 7	7; 3	7; 5	5; 7	1; 7

=== Indonesia vs Hong Kong ===
Indonesia
2
Tianhe Sports Center
9 May 2002, 19:30 UTC+8

Hong Kong
3

			1	2	3	4	5
1	(Indonesia) (Hong Kong)	Lidya Djaelawijaya; Wang Chen	7; 5	2; 7	4; 7	2; 7
2	(Indonesia) (Hong Kong)	Ellen Angelina; Ling Wan Ting	7; 2	5; 7	7; 8	1; 7
3	(Indonesia) (Hong Kong)	Yuli Marfuah; Koon Wai Chee	8; 6	8; 7	7; 4
4	(Indonesia) (Hong Kong)	Eny Erlangga / Jo Novita; Koon Wai Chee / Wang Chen	8; 6	2; 7	8; 6	3; 7	4; 7
5	(Indonesia) (Hong Kong)	Deyana Lomban / Vita Marissa; Li Wing Mui / Ling Wan Ting	7; 1	7; 2	7; 4

=== Denmark vs Hong Kong ===
Denmark
2
Tianhe Sports Center
11 May 2002, 19:30 UTC+8

Hong Kong
3

			1	2	3	4	5
1	(Denmark) (Hong Kong)	Camilla Martin; Wang Chen	5; 7	7; 1	4; 7	2; 7
2	(Denmark) (Hong Kong)	Christina Sørensen; Ling Wan Ting	4; 7	0; 7	4; 7
3	(Denmark) (Hong Kong)	Tine Høy; Koon Wai Chee	7; 4	2; 7	7; 5	2; 7	4; 7
4	(Denmark) (Hong Kong)	Jane Bramsen / Ann-Lou Jørgensen; Li Wing Mui / Ling Wan Ting	7; 1	7; 1	8; 6
5	(Denmark) (Hong Kong)	Rikke Olsen / Tine Rasmussen; Koon Wai Chee / Wang Chen	7; 0	7; 5	7; 3

=== Indonesia vs Netherlands ===
Indonesia
2
Tianhe Sports Center
11 May 2002, 19:30 UTC+8

Netherlands
3

			1	2	3	4	5
1	(Indonesia) (Netherlands)	Lidya Djaelawijaya; Mia Audina	2; 7	4; 7	2; 7
2	(Indonesia) (Netherlands)	Ellen Angelina; Judith Meulendijks	8; 6	2; 7	0; 7	3; 7
3	(Indonesia) (Netherlands)	Yuli Marfuah; Brenda Beenhakker	1; 7	7; 4	7; 3	8; 6
4	(Indonesia) (Netherlands)	Emma Ermawati / Minarti Timur; Mia Audina / Lotte Jonathans	7; 0	7; 5	4; 7	4; 7	3; 7
5	(Indonesia) (Netherlands)	Deyana Lomban / Vita Marissa; Brenda Beenhakker / Karina de Wit	7; 5	7; 2	7; 4

=== Netherlands vs Hong Kong ===
Netherlands
3
Tianhe Sports Center
13 May 2002, 19:30 UTC+8

Hong Kong
2

			1	2	3	4	5
1	(Netherlands) (Hong Kong)	Mia Audina; Wang Chen	7; 5	7; 1	7; 5
2	(Netherlands) (Hong Kong)	Judith Meulendijks; Ling Wan Ting	1; 7	3; 7	7; 1	4; 7
3	(Netherlands) (Hong Kong)	Karina de Wit; Koon Wai Chee	1; 7	3; 7	8; 7	4; 7
4	(Netherlands) (Hong Kong)	Mia Audina / Lotte Jonathans; Koon Wai Chee / Wang Chen	7; 4	7; 1	8; 6
5	(Netherlands) (Hong Kong)	Karina de Wit / Judith Meulendijks; Li Wing Mui / Ling Wan Ting	5; 7	3; 7	7; 1	7; 0	7; 5

=== Denmark vs Indonesia ===
Denmark
1
Tianhe Sports Center
13 May 2002, 19:30 UTC+8

Indonesia
4

			1	2	3	4	5
1	(Denmark) (Indonesia)	Camilla Martin; Lidya Djaelawijaya	7; 1	7; 0	2; 7	7; 2
2	(Denmark) (Indonesia)	Pernille Harder / Mette Schjoldager; Deyana Lomban / Vita Marissa	6; 8	7; 1	7; 8	7; 8
3	(Denmark) (Indonesia)	Christina Sørensen; Atu Rosalina	4; 7	4; 7	3; 7
4	(Denmark) (Indonesia)	Jane Bramsen / Ann-Lou Jørgensen; Eny Erlangga / Jo Novita	1; 7	7; 5	0; 7	4; 7
5	(Denmark) (Indonesia)	Tine Høy; Yuli Marfuah	3; 7	7; 3	8; 7	3; 7	0; 7

== Group B ==
Pos	Team	Pld	W	L	GF	GA	GD	PF	PA	PD	Pts	Qualification
1	China (H)	3	3	0	43	6	+37	321	124	+197	3	Advance to semi-finals
2	South Korea	3	2	1	29	23	+6	260	230	+30	2	Advance to semi-finals
3	Japan	3	1	2	19	37	−18	261	324	−63	1	
4	Germany	3	0	3	16	41	−25	196	360	−164	0	

Source: BadmintonCN
(H) Host

=== South Korea vs Japan ===
South Korea
4
Tianhe Sports Center
10 May 2002, 19:30 UTC+8

Japan
1

			1	2	3	4	5
1	(South Korea) (Japan)	Kim Kyung-ran; Kanako Yonekura	5; 7	7; 8	4; 7
2	(South Korea) (Japan)	Lee Kyung-won; Kaori Mori	7; 3	8; 6	7; 3
3	(South Korea) (Japan)	Ra Kyung-min; Miho Tanaka	7; 4	3; 7	7; 1	7; 0
4	(South Korea) (Japan)	Hwang Yu-mi / Lee Hyo-jung; Seiko Yamada / Shizuka Yamamoto	7; 2	7; 2	7; 5
5	(South Korea) (Japan)	Ra Kyung-min / Lee Kyung-won; Chikako Nakayama / Keiko Yoshitomi	7; 2	7; 2	7; 1

=== China vs Germany ===
China
5
Tianhe Sports Center
10 May 2002, 19:30 UTC+8

Germany
0

			1	2	3	4	5
1	(China) (Germany)	Zhou Mi; Petra Overzier	7; 3	7; 0	7; 1
2	(China) (Germany)	Gao Ling / Huang Sui; Nicole Grether / Nicol Pitro	7; 1	7; 1	7; 5
3	(China) (Germany)	Zhang Ning; Nicole Grether	8; 6	7; 1	7; 0
4	(China) (Germany)	Wei Yili / Zhang Jiewen; Caren Hückstädt / Carina Mette	7; 1	7; 0	7; 0
5	(China) (Germany)	Dai Yun; Katja Michalowsky	7; 1	7; 1	7; 0

=== China vs South Korea ===
China
4
Tianhe Sports Center
12 May 2002, 19:30 UTC+8

South Korea
1

			1	2	3	4	5
1	(China) (South Korea)	Zhou Mi; Kwon Hee-sook	7; 1	7; 5	7; 1
2	(China) (South Korea)	Wei Yili / Zhang Jiewen; Hwang Yu-mi / Lee Hyo-jung	7; 0	1; 7	5; 7	0; 7
3	(China) (South Korea)	Gong Ruina; Shin Ja-young	7; 0	7; 3	7; 0
4	(China) (South Korea)	Huang Nanyan / Yang Wei; Kim Kyung-ran / Kwon Hee-sook	7; 0	7; 0	7; 0
5	(China) (South Korea)	Dai Yun; Lee Jong-boon	7; 2	7; 0	7; 0

=== Japan vs Germany ===
Japan
3
Tianhe Sports Center
12 May 2002, 19:30 UTC+8

Germany
2

			1	2	3	4	5
1	(Japan) (Germany)	Kanako Yonekura; Petra Overzier	7; 3	4; 7	8; 7	7; 4
2	(Japan) (Germany)	Kaori Mori; Nicole Grether	2; 7	8; 6	2; 7	1; 7
3	(Japan) (Germany)	Miho Tanaka; Juliane Schenk	7; 2	7; 0	3; 7	6; 8	0; 7
4	(Japan) (Germany)	Seiko Yamada / Shizuka Yamamoto; Nicole Grether / Nicol Pitro	7; 5	7; 3	3; 7	7; 2
5	(Japan) (Germany)	Chikako Nakayama / Keiko Yoshitomi; Carina Mette / Juliane Schenk	5; 7	7; 2	7; 0	5; 7	7; 2

=== South Korea vs Germany ===
South Korea
4
Tianhe Sports Center
13 May 2002, 19:30 UTC+8

Germany
1

			1	2	3	4	5
1	(South Korea) (Germany)	Kim Kyung-ran; Petra Overzier	7; 4	7; 4	2; 7	7; 0
2	(South Korea) (Germany)	Kwon Hee-sook; Nicole Grether	7; 8	7; 5	7; 8	7; 1	7; 0
3	(South Korea) (Germany)	Shin Ja-young; Juliane Schenk	8; 6	7; 0	3; 7	1; 7	4; 7
4	(South Korea) (Germany)	Lee Kyung-won / Ra Kyung-min; Nicol Pitro / Nicole Grether	7; 3	7; 1	7; 1
5	(South Korea) (Germany)	Hwang Yu-mi / Lee Hyo-jung; Carina Mette / Juliane Schenk	7; 1	7; 2	7; 1

=== China vs Japan ===
China
5
Tianhe Sports Center
13 May 2002, 19:30 UTC+8

Japan
0

			1	2	3	4	5
1	(China) (Japan)	Zhou Mi; Kanako Yonekura	5; 7	7; 5	7; 4	7; 0
2	(China) (Japan)	Gao Ling / Huang Sui; Seiko Yamada / Shizuka Yamamoto	7; 2	7; 0	7; 0
3	(China) (Japan)	Gong Ruina; Kaori Mori	7; 4	0; 7	8; 6	7; 3
4	(China) (Japan)	Wei Yili / Zhang Jiewen; Chikako Nakayama / Keiko Yoshitomi	7; 0	7; 3	4; 7	7; 3
5	(China) (Japan)	Dai Yun; Miho Tanaka	7; 0	7; 0	7; 4
