= 2002 Thomas & Uber Cup =

Biennial international badminton team championship

2002 Thomas & Uber Cup 2002年汤姆斯杯和尤伯杯

Tournament details
- Dates: 9 May–19 May 2002
- Edition: 22nd (Thomas Cup); 19th (Uber Cup)
- Level: International
- Venue: Tianhe Sports Center
- Location: Guangzhou, China

The 2002 Thomas & Uber Cup was held in Guangzhou, China from May 9 to May 19, 2002. It was the 22nd tournament of World Men's Team Badminton Championships of Thomas Cup and 19th tournament of World Women's Team Badminton Championships of Uber Cup.

It is the only Thomas & Uber Cup that was played in a 7 points / 5 sets scoring system.

Indonesia won the Thomas Cup for the fifth time in a row and China won the Uber Cup for the third time in a row.

== Host city selection ==
Hong Kong, Bangkok, Singapore, Jakarta, Kuala Lumpur, New Delhi and Tokyo were among the cities interested to host the events. However, after a long discussion with Chinese Badminton Association, Guangzhou was confirmed as host in January 2002.

== Qualification ==
China qualified automatically as hosts. Indonesia qualified for the Thomas Cup as title holders.

=== Thomas Cup ===
Means of qualification	Date	Venue	Slot	Qualified teams
Host country	15 January 2002	Beijing	1	China
2000 Thomas Cup	11 – 21 May 2000	Kuala Lumpur	1	Indonesia
European Zone	15 – 18 February 2002	Eindhoven	3	Denmark
European Zone	15 – 18 February 2002	Eindhoven	3	Germany
European Zone	15 – 18 February 2002	Eindhoven	3	Sweden
Oceania Zone	20 – 24 February 2002	Melbourne	3	Malaysia
Oceania Zone	20 – 24 February 2002	Melbourne	3	South Korea
Oceania Zone	20 – 24 February 2002	Melbourne	3	Thailand
Total			8	

=== Uber Cup ===
Means of qualification	Date	Venue	Slot	Qualified teams
Host country	15 January 2002	Beijing	1	China
European Zone	15 – 18 February 2002	Eindhoven	3	Denmark
European Zone	15 – 18 February 2002	Eindhoven	3	Germany
European Zone	15 – 18 February 2002	Eindhoven	3	Netherlands
Oceania Zone	20 – 24 February 2002	Melbourne	4	Hong Kong
Oceania Zone	20 – 24 February 2002	Melbourne	4	Indonesia
Oceania Zone	20 – 24 February 2002	Melbourne	4	Japan
Oceania Zone	20 – 24 February 2002	Melbourne	4	South Korea
Total			8	

== Medal summary ==
=== Medalists ===
Event	Gold	Silver	Bronze
Thomas Cup	Indonesia	Malaysia	Denmark
Thomas Cup	Indonesia	Malaysia	China
Uber Cup	China	South Korea	Hong Kong
Uber Cup	China	South Korea	Netherlands

=== Medal table ===
* Host nation (China)

Rank	Nation	Gold	Silver	Bronze	Total
1	China*	1	0	1	2
2	Indonesia	1	0	0	1
3	Malaysia	0	1	0	1
3	South Korea	0	1	0	1
5	Denmark	0	0	1	1
5	Hong Kong	0	0	1	1
5	Netherlands	0	0	1	1
Totals (7 entries)		2	2	4	8

== Thomas Cup ==
=== Group stage ===
==== Group A ====
Pos	Team	Pld	W	L	GF	GA	GD	PF	PA	PD	Pts	Qualification
1	China	3	3	0	36	13	+23	296	185	+111	3	Advance to semi-finals
2	Denmark	3	2	1	35	23	+12	318	262	+56	2	Advance to semi-finals
3	South Korea	3	1	2	29	27	+2	286	281	+5	1	
4	Sweden	3	0	3	8	45	−37	178	350	−172	0	

Source: BadmintonCN

9 May 2002
19:30 UTC+8

China	5–0	Sweden
Report

Tianhe Sports Center, Guangzhou

9 May 2002
19:30 UTC+8

Denmark	3–2	South Korea
Report

Tianhe Sports Center, Guangzhou

11 May 2002
19:30 UTC+8

South Korea	5–0	Sweden
Report

Tianhe Sports Center, Guangzhou

11 May 2002
19:30 UTC+8

China	3–2	Denmark
Report

Tianhe Sports Center, Guangzhou

14 May 2002
19:30 UTC+8

Denmark	5–0	Sweden
Report

Tianhe Sports Center, Guangzhou

14 May 2002
19:30 UTC+8

China	4–1	South Korea
Report

Tianhe Sports Center, Guangzhou

==== Group B ====
Pos	Team	Pld	W	L	GF	GA	GD	PF	PA	PD	Pts	Qualification
1	Indonesia	3	3	0	43	12	+31	322	232	+90	3	Advance to semi-finals
2	Malaysia	3	2	1	36	14	+22	310	212	+98	2	Advance to semi-finals
3	Thailand	3	1	2	18	35	−17	263	297	−34	1	
4	Germany	3	0	3	7	43	−36	162	316	−154	0	

Source: BadmintonCN

10 May 2002
19:30 UTC+8

Indonesia	5–0	Thailand
Report

Tianhe Sports Center, Guangzhou

10 May 2002
19:30 UTC+8

Malaysia	5–0	Germany
Report

Tianhe Sports Center, Guangzhou

12 May 2002
19:30 UTC+8

Indonesia	4–1	Malaysia
Report

Tianhe Sports Center, Guangzhou

12 May 2002
19:30 UTC+8

Thailand	4–1	Germany
Report

Tianhe Sports Center, Guangzhou

14 May 2002
19:30 UTC+8

Malaysia	5–0	Thailand
Report

Tianhe Sports Center, Guangzhou

14 May 2002
19:30 UTC+8

Indonesia	5–0	Germany
Report

Tianhe Sports Center, Guangzhou

=== Knockout stage ===
==== Bracket ====
Semi-finals
China	1
Malaysia	3
Denmark	0
Indonesia	3

Final
Malaysia	2
Indonesia	3

==== Semi-finals ====
16 May 2002
19:30 UTC+8

China	1–3	Malaysia
Report

Tianhe Sports Center, Guangzhou

17 May 2002
19:30 UTC+8

Indonesia	3–0	Denmark
Report

Tianhe Sports Center, Guangzhou

==== Final ====
19 May 2002
19:30 UTC+8

Indonesia	3–2	Malaysia
Report

Tianhe Sports Center, Guangzhou

2002 Thomas Cup winner

Indonesia
Thirteenth title

== Uber Cup ==
=== Group stage ===
==== Group A ====
Pos	Team	Pld	W	L	GF	GA	GD	PF	PA	PD	Pts	Qualification
1	Netherlands	3	3	0	30	25	+5	289	267	+22	3	Advance to semi-finals
2	Hong Kong	3	2	1	26	30	−4	286	297	−11	2	Advance to semi-finals
3	Indonesia	3	1	2	32	26	+6	293	320	−27	1	
4	Denmark	3	0	3	24	31	−7	286	270	+16	0	

Source: BadmintonCN

11 May 2002
19:30 UTC+8

Denmark	2–3	Netherlands
Report

Tianhe Sports Center, Guangzhou

11 May 2002
19:30 UTC+8

Indonesia	2–3	Hong Kong
Report

Tianhe Sports Center, Guangzhou

13 May 2002
19:30 UTC+8

Denmark	2–3	Hong Kong
Report

Tianhe Sports Center, Guangzhou

13 May 2002
19:30 UTC+8

Indonesia	2–3	Netherlands
Report

Tianhe Sports Center, Guangzhou

15 May 2002
19:30 UTC+8

Netherlands	3–2	Hong Kong
Report

Tianhe Sports Center, Guangzhou

15 May 2002
19:30 UTC+8

Denmark	1–4	Indonesia
Report

Tianhe Sports Center, Guangzhou

==== Group B ====
Pos	Team	Pld	W	L	GF	GA	GD	PF	PA	PD	Pts	Qualification
1	China	3	3	0	43	6	+37	321	124	+197	3	Advance to semi-finals
2	South Korea	3	2	1	29	23	+6	260	230	+30	2	Advance to semi-finals
3	Japan	3	1	2	19	37	−18	261	324	−63	1	
4	Germany	3	0	3	16	41	−25	196	360	−164	0	

Source: BadmintonCN

12 May 2002
19:30 UTC+8

South Korea	4–1	Japan
Report

Tianhe Sports Center, Guangzhou

12 May 2002
19:30 UTC+8

China	5–0	Germany
Report

Tianhe Sports Center, Guangzhou

14 May 2002
19:30 UTC+8

China	4–1	South Korea
Report

Tianhe Sports Center, Guangzhou

14 May 2002
19:30 UTC+8

Japan	3–2	Germany
Report

Tianhe Sports Center, Guangzhou

15 May 2002
19:30 UTC+8

South Korea	4–1	Hong Kong
Report

Tianhe Sports Center, Guangzhou

15 May 2002
19:30 UTC+8

China	5–0	Japan
Report

Tianhe Sports Center, Guangzhou

=== Knockout stage ===
==== Bracket ====
Semi-finals
Netherlands	2
South Korea	3
Hong Kong	0
China	3

Final
South Korea	1
China	3

==== Semi-finals ====
15 May 2002
19:30 UTC+8

South Korea	3–2	Netherlands
Report

Tianhe Sports Center, Guangzhou

15 May 2002
19:30 UTC+8

China	3–0	Hong Kong
Report

Tianhe Sports Center, Guangzhou

==== Final ====
18 May 2002
13:30 UTC+8

China	3–0	South Korea
Report

Tianhe Sports Center, Guangzhou

2002 Uber Cup winner

China
Eighth title
