= 2002 Thomas Cup group stage =

Badminton team Tournament in Kuala Lumpur

The 2002 Thomas Cup group stage was held at Tianhe Sports Center in Guangzhou, China, from 9 to 14 May 2002.

The group stage was first stage of the tournament where only the two highest-placing teams in each of the two groups advanced to the knockout stage.

== Draw ==
The original draw for the tournament was conducted on 2 April 2002. The 8 teams will be drawn into two groups each containing four teams.

=== Group composition ===
Group
Group A	Group B
China (Host); Denmark; South Korea; Sweden	Germany; Indonesia; Malaysia; Thailand

== Group A ==
Pos	Team	Pld	W	L	GF	GA	GD	PF	PA	PD	Pts	Qualification
1	China (H)	3	3	0	36	13	+23	296	185	+111	3	Advance to semi-finals
2	Denmark	3	2	1	35	23	+12	318	262	+56	2	Advance to semi-finals
3	South Korea	3	1	2	29	27	+2	286	281	+5	1	
4	Sweden	3	0	3	8	45	−37	178	350	−172	0	

Source: BadmintonCN
(H) Host

=== China vs Sweden ===
China
5
Tianhe Sports Center
9 May 2002, 19:30 UTC+8

Sweden
0

			1	2	3	4	5
1	(China) (Sweden)	Xia Xuanze; Rasmus Wengberg	7; 0	7; 2	7; 2
2	(China) (Sweden)	Zhang Jun / Zhang Wei; Joakim Andersson / Johan Holm	7; 3	7; 3	7; 1
3	(China) (Sweden)	Lin Dan; Daniel Eriksson	7; 2	8; 7	7; 4
4	(China) (Sweden)	Cheng Rui / Wang Wei; Henrik Andersson / Fredrik Bergström	7; 1	7; 0	3; 7	7; 3
5	(China) (Sweden)	Luo Yigang; Per-Henrik Croona	7; 3	7; 2	7; 4

=== Denmark vs South Korea ===
Denmark
3
Tianhe Sports Center
9 May 2002, 19:30 UTC+8

South Korea
2

			1	2	3	4	5
1	(Denmark) (South Korea)	Kenneth Jonassen; Lee Hyun-il	7; 5	7; 0	4; 7	6; 8	7; 3
2	(Denmark) (South Korea)	Jens Eriksen / Martin Lundgaard Hansen; Ha Tae-kwon / Kim Dong-moon	1; 7	8; 6	7; 2	7; 8	1; 7
3	(Denmark) (South Korea)	Anders Boesen; Shon Seung-mo	7; 4	3; 7	4; 7	1; 7
4	(Denmark) (South Korea)	Lars Paaske / Jonas Rasmussen; Lee Dong-soo / Yoo Yong-sung	7; 2	8; 6	3; 7	7; 2
5	(Denmark) (South Korea)	Peter Rasmussen; Park Tae-sang	8; 7	7; 3	7; 1

=== South Korea vs Sweden ===
South Korea
5
Tianhe Sports Center
11 May 2002, 19:30 UTC+8

Sweden
0

			1	2	3	4	5
1	(South Korea) (Sweden)	Lee Hyun-il; Rasmus Wengberg	1; 7	7; 2	7; 3	2; 7	7; 2
2	(South Korea) (Sweden)	Ha Tae-kwon / Kim Dong-moon; Joakim Andersson / Johan Holm	7; 0	7; 1	7; 2
3	(South Korea) (Sweden)	Shon Seung-mo; Daniel Eriksson	7; 1	7; 5	7; 1
4	(South Korea) (Sweden)	Lee Dong-soo / Yoo Yong-sung; Henrik Andersson / Fredrik Bergström	7; 5	7; 5	7; 2
5	(South Korea) (Sweden)	Jang Young-soo; Martin Hagberg	6; 8	7; 3	8; 6	7; 4

=== China vs Denmark ===
China
3
Tianhe Sports Center
11 May 2002, 19:30 UTC+8

Denmark
2

			1	2	3	4	5
1	(China) (Denmark)	Xia Xuanze; Kenneth Jonassen	8; 6	2; 7	7; 1	7; 1
2	(China) (Denmark)	Zhang Jun / Zhang Wei; Jens Eriksen / Martin Lundgaard Hansen	2; 7	3; 7	3; 7
3	(China) (Denmark)	Bao Chunlai; Anders Boesen	7; 3	7; 2	7; 5
4	(China) (Denmark)	Cheng Rui / Wang Wei; Lars Paaske / Jonas Rasmussen	4; 7	5; 7	7; 2	5; 7
5	(China) (Denmark)	Lin Dan; Peter Rasmussen	7; 1	7; 3	1; 7	7; 2

=== Denmark vs Sweden ===
Denmark
5
Tianhe Sports Center
14 May 2002, 19:30 UTC+8

Sweden
0

			1	2	3	4	5
1	(Denmark) (Sweden)	Kenneth Jonassen; Rasmus Wengberg	7; 4	5; 7	8; 6	7; 5
2	(Denmark) (Sweden)	Anders Boesen; Per-Henrik Croona	7; 3	7; 1	7; 1
3	(Denmark) (Sweden)	Peter Rasmussen; Martin Hagberg	7; 2	7; 1	5; 7	7; 1
4	(Denmark) (Sweden)	Jens Eriksen / Martin Lundgaard Hansen; Joakim Andersson / Johan Holm	7; 1	7; 1	8; 6
5	(Denmark) (Sweden)	Lars Paaske / Jonas Rasmussen; Henrik Andersson / Fredrik Bergström	7; 4	7; 0	4; 7	5; 7	7; 5

=== China vs South Korea ===
China
4
Tianhe Sports Center
14 May 2002, 19:30 UTC+8

South Korea
1

			1	2	3	4	5
1	(China) (South Korea)	Xia Xuanze; Lee Hyun-il	7; 5	7; 1	7; 5
2	(China) (South Korea)	Cheng Rui / Wang Wei; Kim Dong-moon / Yoo Yong-sung	4; 7	4; 7	4; 7
3	(China) (South Korea)	Lin Dan; Shon Seung-mo	7; 5	7; 2	7; 2
4	(China) (South Korea)	Chen Qiqiu / Zhang Wei; Ha Tae-kwon / Lee Dong-soo	7; 3	4; 7	7; 3	7; 1
5	(China) (South Korea)	Luo Yigang; Jang Young-soo	7; 4	7; 4	7; 2

== Group B ==
Pos	Team	Pld	W	L	GF	GA	GD	PF	PA	PD	Pts	Qualification
1	Indonesia	3	3	0	43	12	+31	322	232	+90	3	Advance to semi-finals
2	Malaysia	3	2	1	36	14	+22	310	212	+98	2	Advance to semi-finals
3	Thailand	3	1	2	18	35	−17	263	297	−34	1	
4	Germany	3	0	3	7	43	−36	162	316	−154	0	

Source: BadmintonCN

=== Indonesia vs Thailand ===
Indonesia
5
Tianhe Sports Center
10 May 2002, 19:30 UTC+8

Thailand
0

			1	2	3	4	5
1	(Indonesia) (Thailand)	Marleve Mainaky; Boonsak Ponsana	7; 4	7; 4	7; 2
2	(Indonesia) (Thailand)	Sigit Budiarto / Candra Wijaya; Tesana Panvisavas / Pramote Teerawiwatana	8; 6	7; 0	7; 4
3	(Indonesia) (Thailand)	Taufik Hidayat; Anupap Thiraratsakul	1; 7	2; 7	8; 7	8; 7	7; 0
4	(Indonesia) (Thailand)	Halim Haryanto / Tri Kusharjanto; Patapol Ngernsrisuk / Khunakorn Sudhisodhi	7; 5	7; 5	7; 1
5	(Indonesia) (Thailand)	Hendrawan; Jakrapan Thanathiratham	0; 7	8; 7	7; 5	2; 7	7; 1

=== Malaysia vs Germany ===
Malaysia
5
Tianhe Sports Center
10 May 2002, 19:30 UTC+8

Germany
0

			1	2	3	4	5
1	(Malaysia) (Germany)	Wong Choong Hann; Björn Joppien	7; 4	7; 5	7; 3
2	(Malaysia) (Germany)	Chan Chong Ming / Chew Choon Eng; Kristof Hopp / Thomas Tesche	7; 1	7; 4	7; 3
3	(Malaysia) (Germany)	Muhammad Hafiz Hashim; Jens Roch	7; 2	7; 0	7; 4
4	(Malaysia) (Germany)	Chang Kim Wai / Choong Tan Fook; Jochen Cassel / Joachim Tesche	8; 6	7; 1	7; 3
5	(Malaysia) (Germany)	Lee Tsuen Seng; Oliver Pongratz	7; 0	7; 1	7; 0

=== Indonesia vs Malaysia ===
Indonesia
4
Tianhe Sports Center
12 May 2002, 19:30 UTC+8

Malaysia
1

			1	2	3	4	5
1	(Indonesia) (Malaysia)	Marleve Mainaky; Wong Choong Hann	1; 7	2; 7	7; 2	5; 7
2	(Indonesia) (Malaysia)	Sigit Budiarto / Candra Wijaya; Chan Chong Ming / Lee Wan Wah	7; 0	7; 4	7; 4
3	(Indonesia) (Malaysia)	Taufik Hidayat; Ong Ewe Hock	2; 7	7; 2	7; 0	8; 6
4	(Indonesia) (Malaysia)	Halim Haryanto / Tri Kusharjanto; Chew Choon Eng / Choong Tan Fook	7; 4	7; 4	7; 5
5	(Indonesia) (Malaysia)	Hendrawan; Muhammad Hafiz Hashim	3; 7	8; 7	7; 8	7; 5	7; 4

=== Thailand vs Germany ===
Thailand
4
Tianhe Sports Center
12 May 2002, 19:30 UTC+8

Germany
1

			1	2	3	4	5
1	(Thailand) (Germany)	Boonsak Ponsana; Björn Joppien	7; 4	7; 1	1; 7	7; 0
2	(Thailand) (Germany)	Tesana Panvisavas / Pramote Teerawiwatana; Kristof Hopp / Thomas Tesche	7; 5	7; 0	6; 8	8; 6
3	(Thailand) (Germany)	Anupap Thiraratsakul; Jens Roch	7; 3	7; 0	7; 3
4	(Thailand) (Germany)	Patapol Ngernsrisuk / Khunakorn Sudhisodhi; Ingo Kindervater / Björn Siegemund	7; 3	7; 3	7; 5
5	(Thailand) (Germany)	Jakrapan Thanathiratham; Oliver Pongratz	7; 1	5; 7	2; 7	4; 7

=== Malaysia vs Thailand ===
Malaysia
5
Tianhe Sports Center
14 May 2002, 19:30 UTC+8

Thailand
0

			1	2	3	4	5
1	(Malaysia) (Thailand)	Wong Choong Hann; Boonsak Ponsana	7; 5	7; 1	7; 3
2	(Malaysia) (Thailand)	Chan Chong Ming / Chew Choon Eng; Pramote Teerawiwatana / Tesana Panvisavas	8; 6	8; 6	7; 5
3	(Malaysia) (Thailand)	Ong Ewe Hock; Anupap Thiraratsakul	7; 0	7; 3	7; 3
4	(Malaysia) (Thailand)	Choong Tan Fook / Lee Wan Wah; Khunakorn Sudhisodhi / Patapol Ngernsrisuk	8; 7	5; 7	8; 6	7; 2
5	(Malaysia) (Thailand)	Roslin Hashim; Jakrapan Thanathiratham	7; 5	7; 2	7; 4

=== Indonesia vs Germany ===
Indonesia
5
Tianhe Sports Center
14 May 2002, 19:30 UTC+8

Germany
0

			1	2	3	4	5
1	(Indonesia) (Germany)	Hendrawan; Björn Joppien	5; 7	7; 5	7; 1	7; 5
2	(Indonesia) (Germany)	Sigit Budiarto / Halim Haryanto; Ingo Kindervater / Björn Siegemund	8; 6	7; 4	7; 3
3	(Indonesia) (Germany)	Budi Santoso; Jens Roch	7; 5	7; 0	5; 7	7; 5
4	(Indonesia) (Germany)	Candra Wijaya / Bambang Suprianto; Jochen Cassel / Joachim Tesche	7; 1	7; 0	7; 4
5	(Indonesia) (Germany)	Rony Agustinus; Conrad Hückstädt	7; 4	7; 1	7; 3
