= List of National Sports Award recipients in badminton =

National Sports Awards in Badminton
- Various civilian awards for contributions to Sports (Individual/Team)
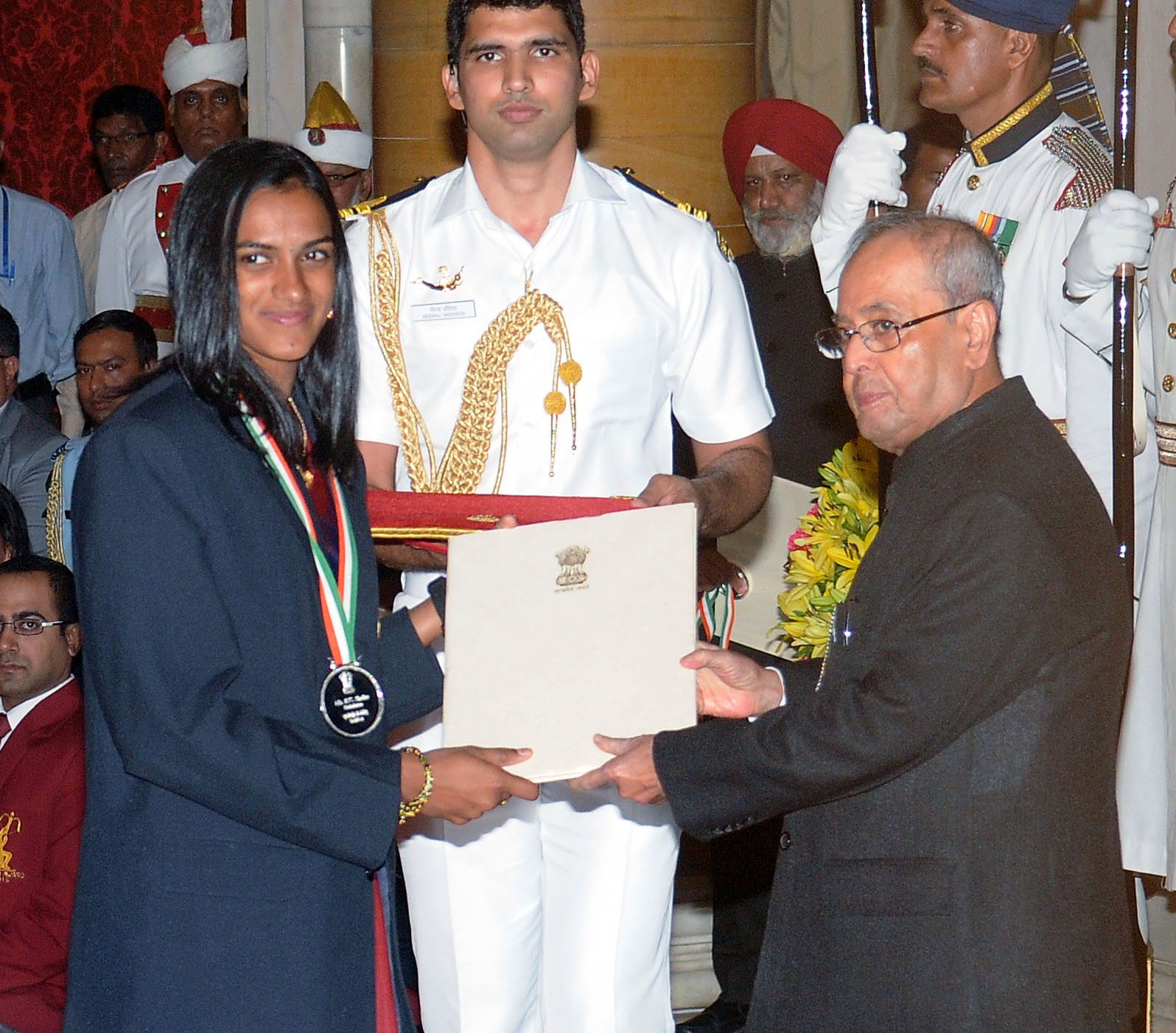
- Awarded for: Various sports honour of India
- Sponsored by: Government of India
- Location: Rashtrapati Bhavan
- Country: Republic of India
- Presented by: President of India
- First award: 1961
- Final award: 2024

Highlights
- Total awarded: 47
- Awards: Arjuna Award; Dronacharya Award; Major Dhyan Chand Khel Ratna; Dhyan Chand Award

The National Sports Awards is the collective name given to the six sports awards of Republic of India. It is awarded annually by the Ministry of Youth Affairs and Sports. They are presented by the President of India in the same ceremony at the Rashtrapati Bhavan usually on 29 August each year along with the national adventure award. As of 2024, a total of forty-seven individuals have been awarded the various National Sports Awards in badminton. The four awards presented in badminton are Rajiv Gandhi Khel Ratna, Arjuna Award, Dhyan Chand Award and Dronacharya Award.

First presented in the year 1961, a total of thirty-seven individuals have been honoured with the Arjuna Award in badminton for their "good performance at the international level" over the period of last four years. First presented in the year 2000, a total of three coaches have been honoured with the Dronacharya Award in badminton for their "outstanding work on a consistent basis and enabling sportspersons to excel in international events" over the period of last four years, with two coaches being awarded in the lifetime contribution category. First presented in the year 2000–2001, a total of five sportspersons have been honoured with the Rajiv Gandhi Khel Ratna, the highest sporting honour of India, in badminton for their "most outstanding performance at the international level" over the period of last four years. First presented in the year 2020, a total of three retired sportspersons have been honoured with the Dhyan Chand Award, the lifetime achievement sporting honour of India, in badminton for their "good performance at the international level and their continued contributions to the promotion of sports even after their career as a sportsperson is over."

== Recipients ==
Key
+ Indicates a Lifetime contribution honour

List of National Sports award recipients, showing the year, award and gender
Year	Recipient	Award	Gender
2000–2001	Pullela Gopichand	Rajiv Gandhi Khel Ratna	Male
2010	Saina Nehwal	Rajiv Gandhi Khel Ratna	Female
2016	P. V. Sindhu	Rajiv Gandhi Khel Ratna	Female
2023	Satwiksairaj Rankireddy	Major Dhyan Chand Khel Ratna	Male
2023	Chirag Shetty	Major Dhyan Chand Khel Ratna	Male
1961	Nandu M. Natekar	Arjuna Award	Male
1962	Meena Shah	Arjuna Award	Female
1965	Dinesh Khanna	Arjuna Award	Male
1967	Suresh Goel	Arjuna Award	Male
1969	Dipu Ghosh	Arjuna Award	Male
1970	Damayanti Tambay	Arjuna Award	Female
1971	Sobha Morthy	Arjuna Award	Female
1972	Prakash Padukone	Arjuna Award	Male
1974	Raman Ghosh	Arjuna Award	Male
1975	Devinder Ahuja	Arjuna Award	Male
1976	Ami Ghia	Arjuna Award	Female
1977–1978	Kanwal Thakar Singh	Arjuna Award	Female
1980–1981	Syed Modi	Arjuna Award	Male
1982	Madhumita Bisht	Arjuna Award	Female
1982	Partho Ganguli	Arjuna Award	Male
1999	Pullela Gopichand	Arjuna Award	Male
2000	George Thomas	Arjuna Award	Male
2004	Abhinn Shyam Gupta	Arjuna Award	Male
2005	Aparna Popat	Arjuna Award	Female
2006	Chetan Anand	Arjuna Award	Male
2007	Anup Sridhar	Arjuna Award	Male
2009	Saina Nehwal	Arjuna Award	Female
2011	Jwala Gutta	Arjuna Award	Female
2012	Parupalli Kashyap	Arjuna Award	Male
2012	Ashwini Ponnappa	Arjuna Award	Female
2013	P. V. Sindhu	Arjuna Award	Female
2014	Valiyaveetil Diju	Arjuna Award	Male
2015	Srikanth Kidambi	Arjuna Award	Male
2018	N. Sikki Reddy	Arjuna Award	Female
2019	B. Sai Praneeth	Arjuna Award	Male
2020	Satwiksairaj Rankireddy	Arjuna Award	Male
2020	Chirag Shetty	Arjuna Award	Male
2022	Lakshya Sen	Arjuna Award	Male
2022	Prannoy H. S.	Arjuna Award	Male
2020	Pradeep Gandhe	Dhyan Chand Award	Male
2020	Trupti Murgunde	Dhyan Chand Award	Female
2023	Manjusha Kanwar	Dhyan Chand Award	Female
2017	G. S. S. V. Prasad ^{+}	Dronacharya Award	Male
2024	S Muralidharan ^{+}	Dronacharya Award	Male
2000	S. M. Arif	Dronacharya Award	Male
2009	Pullela Gopichand	Dronacharya Award	Male
2019	U. Vimal Kumar	Dronacharya Award	Male
