= Badminton in India =

- Country: India
- Governing body: Badminton Association of India
- National team: India national badminton team

National competitions
- National Championships (1934–present)

Club competitions
- Premier Badminton League (2016–present)

International competitions
- Olympic Games; World Championships; Paralympic Games; Asian Games; Asian Para Games; Asian Championships; South Asian Games

Badminton is a popular sport in India. It is managed by the Badminton Association of India which is associated with Badminton Asia and Badminton World Federation.

Indian shuttlers Prakash Padukone, Srikanth Kidambi, Jwala Gutta, Saina Nehwal, P. V. Sindhu, Lakshya Sen, Prannoy H. S., Satwiksairaj Rankireddy and Chirag Shetty have all ranked in the world's top ten.

Prakash Padukone was the first player from India to achieve the world no. 1 spot in the game, after which Srikanth Kidambi became the second male player to make it to the top spot in April 2018. Saina Nehwal was the first female player from India to achieve the world no. 1 spot, which she did in April 2015, and the first Indian badminton player to win a medal at the Olympic Games.

P. V. Sindhu is the first Indian to become the World Champion, which she achieved in 2019, and the only badminton player from India to win two consecutive medals at the Olympic Games. One of the most successful Indian doubles player is Jwala Gutta, who was the only Indian to have rank in the top 10 of two categories. She peaked at #6 with Valiyaveetil Diju in mixed doubles and at #10 with Ashwini Ponnappa in women's doubles.

Other successful players include Pullela Gopichand, Aparna Popat, Syed Modi, Chetan Anand, and Parupalli Kashyap.

== History ==
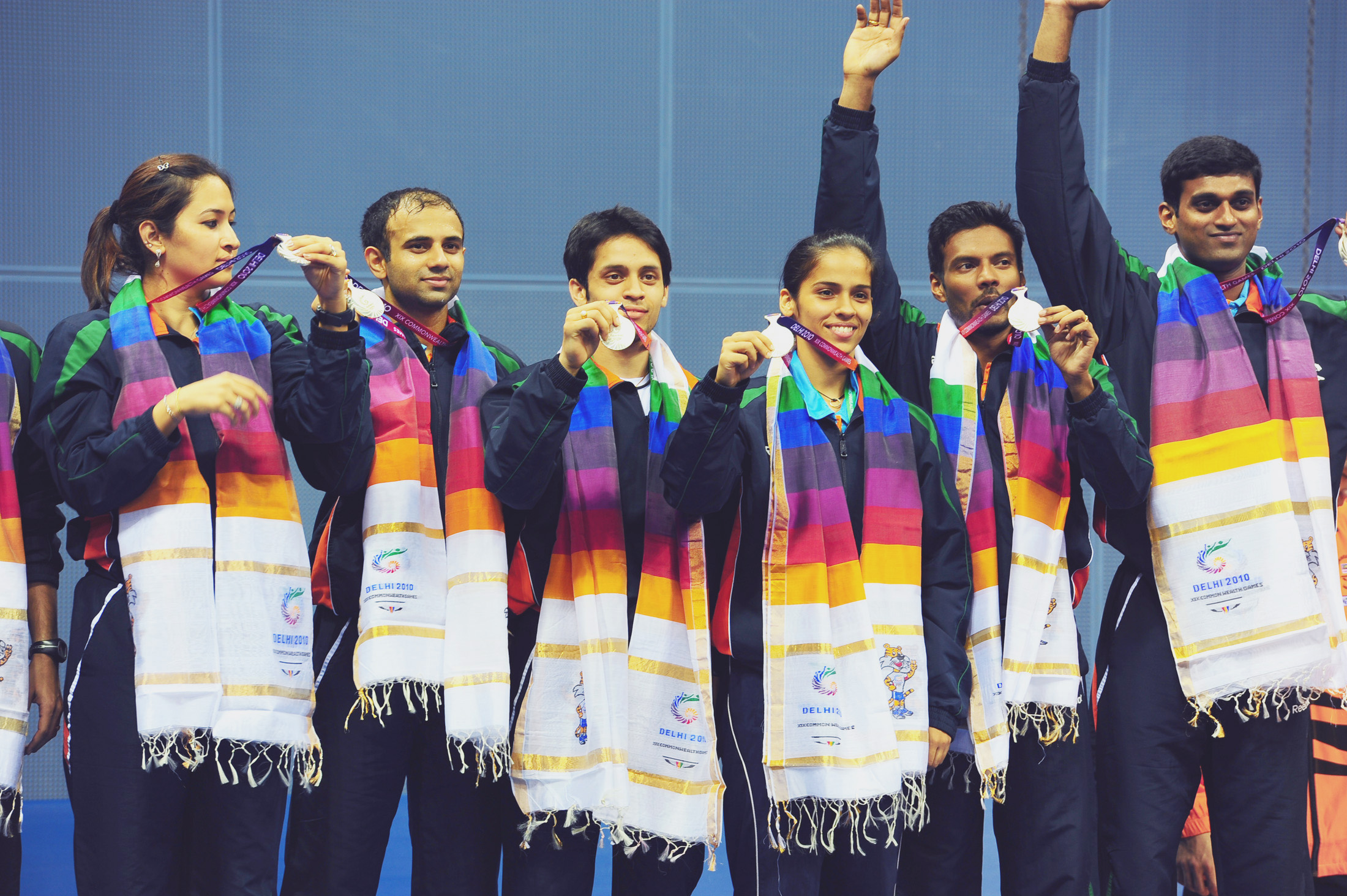
Indian National Badminton Team at the Delhi 2010 Commonwealth Games.

Prakash Padukone and Pullela Gopichand both won the All England Open in 1980 and 2001 respectively, making them the only Indians to win the prestigious title.

Saina Nehwal won the bronze medal in the individual women's competition at the 2012 London Olympic Games, the first Olympic medal for the country in badminton. P. V. Sindhu won the second and the third Olympic medals in badminton for India, winning a silver and a bronze medal at the 2016 Rio Olympics and the 2020 Tokyo Olympics respectively.

India has won several medals at the BWF World Championships as well, with Prakash Padukone winning the first in 1982. The doubles pairing of Jwala Gutta and Ashwini Ponnappa became the first women to win a medal when they won the bronze in 2011. P. V. Sindhu then won consecutive bronze medals at 2013 and 2014 editions, the first Indian player to do so. Saina Nehwal won a first-ever silver at the 2015 Championships, and then a bronze in 2017. P. V. Sindhu won silver in consecutive editions in 2017 and 2018. Sindhu then went on to win the gold at the 2019 BWF World Championships and become the first Indian to ever finish on top of the podium. At the same edition, B. Sai Praneeth medalled in the men's singles after 36 years, clinching the bronze. As a result, for the first time, India won medals in two different disciplines in the same BWF World Championships edition. In 2021, Lakshya Sen won the bronze medal in men's singles while Srikanth Kidambi won the silver, the first time India had two medallists in the same edition in the men's singles discipline. In 2022, Satwiksairaj Rankireddy and Chirag Shetty won India's first World Championship medal in the men's doubles, a bronze. Till date, India has never returned empty handed from the World Championships since 2011.

At the BWF World Junior Championships, Saina Nehwal is the only gold medalist for India, which she achieved in 2008. At the Badminton Asia Junior Championships, P. V. Sindhu and Lakshya Sen are the only gold medalists for India, winning in their respective categories in 2012 and 2018 respectively.

== Olympic Games ==
Year	Event	Player	Result
2024	Men's singles	Lakshya Sen	4th
2024	Men's singles	Prannoy H. S.	Round of 16
2024	Women's singles	P. V. Sindhu	Round of 16
2024	Men's doubles	Satwiksairaj Rankireddy; Chirag Shetty	Quarter Finals
2024	Women's doubles	Ashwini Ponnappa; Tanisha Crasto	Group Stage
2020	Men's singles	B. Sai Praneeth	Group Stage
2020	Women's singles	P. V. Sindhu	3rd place, bronze medalist(s)
2020	Men's doubles	Satwiksairaj Rankireddy; Chirag Shetty	Group Stage
2016	Men's singles	Srikanth Kidambi	Quarter-finals
2016	Women's singles	P. V. Sindhu	2nd place, silver medalist(s)
2016	Women's singles	Saina Nehwal	Group Stage
2016	Men's doubles	Manu Attri; B. Sumeeth Reddy	Group Stage
2016	Women's doubles	Jwala Gutta; Ashwini Ponnappa	Group Stage
2012	Men's singles	Parupalli Kashyap	Quarter Finals
2012	Women's singles	Saina Nehwal	3rd place, bronze medalist(s)
2012	Women's doubles	Jwala Gutta; Ashwini Ponnappa	Group Stage
2012	Mixed doubles	Valiyaveetil Diju; Jwala Gutta	Group Stage
2008	Men's singles	Anup Sridhar	Second Round
2008	Women's singles	Saina Nehwal	Quarter Finals
2004	Men's singles	Nikhil Kanetkar	Round of 16
2004	Men's singles	Abhinn Shyam Gupta	Round of 32
2004	Women's singles	Aparna Popat	Round of 16
2000	Men's singles	Pullela Gopichand	Third Round
2000	Women's singles	Aparna Popat	First Round
1996	Men's singles	Deepankar Bhattacharya	Second Round
1996	Women's singles	P. V. V. Lakshmi	Second Round
1992	Men's singles	Deepankar Bhattacharya	Third Round
1992	Women's singles	Madhumita Bisht	Second Round
1992	Men's doubles	Deepankar Bhattacharya; U. Vimal Kumar	First Round

== Paralympic Games ==
Year	Event	Player	Result
2024	Men's singles SL3	Manoj Sarkar	Group stage
2024	Men's singles SL3	Nitesh Kumar	1st place, gold medalist(s)
2024	Men's singles SL4	Suhas Yathiraj	2nd place, silver medalist(s)
2024	Men's singles SL4	Sukant Kadam	4th
2024	Men's singles SL4	Tarun Dhillon	Group stage
2024	Men's singles SH6	Krishna Nagar	Group stage
2024	Men's singles SH6	Sivarajan Solaimalai	Group stage
2024	Women's singles SL3	Manasi Joshi	Group stage
2024	Women's singles SL3	Mandeep Kaur	Quarter-finals
2024	Women's singles SL4	Palak Kohli	Quarter-finals
2024	Women's singles SU5	Thulasimathi Murugesan	2nd place, silver medalist(s)
2024	Women's singles SU5	Manisha Ramadass	3rd place, bronze medalist(s)
2024	Women's singles SH6	Nithya Sivan	3rd place, bronze medalist(s)
2024	Mixed doubles SL3–SU5	Nitesh Kumar; Thulasimathi Murugesan	Group stage
2024	Mixed doubles SL3–SU5	Suhas Yathiraj; Palak Kohli	Group stage
2024	Mixed doubles SH6	Sivarajan Solaimalai; Nithya Sivan	4th
2020	Men's singles SL3	Pramod Bhagat	1st place, gold medalist(s)
2020	Men's singles SL3	Manoj Sarkar	3rd place, bronze medalist(s)
2020	Men's singles SL1	Tarun Dhillon	4th
2020	Men's singles SL1	Suhas Yathiraj	2nd place, silver medalist(s)
2020	Men's singles SH6	Krishna Nagar	1st place, gold medalist(s)
2020	Women's singles SL4	Parul Parmar	Group stage
2020	Women's singles SU5	Palak Kohli	Quarter-finals
2020	Women's doubles SL3–SU5	Parul Parmar; Palak Kohli	Group stage
2020	Mixed doubles SL3–SU5	Pramod Bhagat; Palak Kohli	4th

== National award recipients ==
Year	Recipient	Award	Gender
2000–2001	Pullela Gopichand	Rajiv Gandhi Khel Ratna	Male
2010	Saina Nehwal	Rajiv Gandhi Khel Ratna	Female
2016	P. V. Sindhu	Rajiv Gandhi Khel Ratna	Female
1961	Nandu M. Natekar	Arjuna Award	Male
1962	Meena Shah	Arjuna Award	Female
1965	Dinesh Khanna	Arjuna Award	Male
1967	Suresh Goel	Arjuna Award	Male
1969	Dipu Ghosh	Arjuna Award	Male
1970	Damayanti Tambay	Arjuna Award	Female
1971	Sobha Morthy	Arjuna Award	Female
1972	Prakash Padukone	Arjuna Award	Male
1974	Raman Ghosh	Arjuna Award	Male
1975	Devinder Ahuja	Arjuna Award	Male
1976	Ami Ghia	Arjuna Award	Female
1977–1978	Kanwal Thakar Singh	Arjuna Award	Female
1980–1981	Syed Modi	Arjuna Award	Male
1982	Madhumita Bisht	Arjuna Award	Female
1982	Partho Ganguli	Arjuna Award	Male
1999	Pullela Gopichand	Arjuna Award	Male
2000	George Thomas	Arjuna Award	Male
2004	Abhinn Shyam Gupta	Arjuna Award	Male
2005	Aparna Popat	Arjuna Award	Female
2006	Chetan Anand	Arjuna Award	Male
2007	Anup Sridhar	Arjuna Award	Male
2009	Saina Nehwal	Arjuna Award	Female
2011	Jwala Gutta	Arjuna Award	Female
2012	Parupalli Kashyap	Arjuna Award	Male
2012	Ashwini Ponnappa	Arjuna Award	Female
2013	P. V. Sindhu	Arjuna Award	Female
2014	Valiyaveetil Diju	Arjuna Award	Male
2015	Srikanth Kidambi	Arjuna Award	Male
2018	N. Sikki Reddy	Arjuna Award	Female
2019	B. Sai Praneeth	Arjuna Award	Male
2020	Satwiksairaj Rankireddy	Arjuna Award	Male
2020	Chirag Shetty	Arjuna Award	Male
2022	Lakshya Sen	Arjuna Award	Male
2022	Prannoy H. S.	Arjuna Award	Male
2020	Pradeep Shrikrishna Gandhe	Dhyan Chand Award	Male
2020	Trupti Murgunde	Dhyan Chand Award	Female
2017	G. S. S. V. Prasad ^{+}	Dronacharya Award	Male
2000	S. M. Arif	Dronacharya Award	Male
2009	Pullela Gopichand	Dronacharya Award	Male
2019	U. Vimal Kumar	Dronacharya Award	Male

Key
+ Indicates a Lifetime contribution honour

== See also ==
- Badminton Association of India
- India national badminton team
- Indian National Badminton Championships
