= Indian National Badminton Championships =

National badminton championship of India

- Sport: Badminton
- Founded: 1934
- Organizing body: Badminton Association of India
- Country: India

The Indian National Badminton Championships is a tournament organized to crown the best badminton players in India since 1934. Until the 1960s, foreign players could compete in the championships, which is why the winners' lists includes Malaysians and Danes (e.g. Erland Kops).

The championships are locally now referred to as the All Indian National Badminton Championships. The National titles in India are the following:

- Men's Singles: Vikas Topiwala Challenge Cup
- Women's Singles: Olympian Badminton Challenge Cup
- Men's Doubles: Calcutta Badminton Cup
- Women's Doubles: All India Badminton Association Cup
- Mixed Doubles: Burdwan Challenge Cup
- Men's Team: Ibrahim Rahimtoola Cup
- Women's Team: Gulab Rai Chadha Cup

== List of winners ==
Ch. No.	Year (Venue)	Men's singles	Women's singles	Men's doubles	Women's doubles	Mixed doubles
1st	1934	Vijay A. Madgavkar	no competition	D. Minas; V. Minas	no competition	no competition
2nd	1935	T. Banerji	T. P. Boland	Vijay A. Madgavkar; B. Roy	T. P. Boland; Cameron	no competition
3rd	1936	George Lewis	Pearl Goss	Harmarain; Hadait	Pearl Goss; D. Shandley	N. Knight; I. Brydges
4th	1937	George Lewis	Pearl Goss	Harmarain; Hadait	Pearl Goss; D. Shandley	George Lewis; Novina George
5th	1938	George Lewis	Pearl Goss	George Lewis; Kartar Singh	Pearl Goss; K. Minos	George Lewis; Novina George
6th	1939	George Lewis	Easdon	Harmarain; Sahur Ahmed	Easdon; Holloway	Kartar Singh; Easdon
7th	1940	(Malaysia) Chee Choon Keng	Pearl Goss	Dattu Mugwe; M. G. Mugwe	P. Cook; Catchik	Vijay A. Madgavkar; Pearl Goss
	1941	no competition				
8th	1942	Prakash Nath	Tara Deodhar	Ashok Nath; Prakash Nath	Tara Deodhar; Sunder Deodhar	Raja Patwardhan; Sunder Deodhar
9th	1943	Devinder Mohan	Tara Deodhar	George Lewis; Devinder Mohan	Tara Deodhar; Sunder Deodhar	V. N. Iyer; Ravibala Chitale
10th	1944	Devinder Mohan	Tara Deodhar	Khandu Rangnekar; Dattu Mugwe	Frenee Talyarkhan; Mumtaj Chinoy	Prakash Nath; Sunder Deodhar
11th	1945	Prakash Nath	Mumtaj Chinoy	George Lewis; Devinder Mohan	Frenee Talyarkhan; Mumtaj Chinoy	Prakash Nath; Sunder Deodhar
12th	1946	Devinder Mohan	Sunder Deodhar	Ashok Nath; Prakash Nath	Suman Deodhar; Sunder Deodhar	Devinder Mohan; Sunder Deodhar
13th	1947	S. A. Durai	(Denmark) Tonny Ahm	A. S. Samuel; Chan Kon Leong	Suman Deodhar; Sunder Deodhar	(Denmark) Tage Madsen (India) Suman Deodhar
	1948	no competition				
14th	1949	Devinder Mohan	Pearl Goss	Dattu Mugwe; Bala V. Ullal	Acharya; Tambe	George Lewis; Novina George
15th	1950	Devinder Mohan	Betty Farias	Henry Ferreira; Devinder Mohan	Betty Farias; Sindhu Phansalkar	Henry Ferreira; Betty Farias
16th	1951	Amrit Lal Diwan	Suman Deodhar	Gajanan Hemmady; Manoj Guha	Suman Deodhar; Sunder Deodhar	Trilok Nath Seth; D. H. Devid
17th	1952	Trilok Nath Seth	Sushila Rege	Henry Ferreira; Devinder Mohan	Sushila Rege; Shashi Bhatt	Henry Ferreira; Sushila Rege
18th	1953	Nandu M. Natekar	Sushila Rege	Gajanan Hemmady; Manoj Guha	Sushila Rege; Shashi Bhatt	Nandu M. Natekar; Shashi Bhat
19th	1954	Nandu M. Natekar	Sunder Deodhar	Gajanan Hemmady; Manoj Guha	Suman Deodhar; Sunder Patwardhan	Nandu M. Natekar; Shashi Bhat
20th	1955	Trilok Nath Seth	Prema Prashar	Nandu M. Natekar; Ravindra. A. Dongre	Prema Prashar; Sushila Kapadia	D. N. Dhongade; Prama Prashar
21st	1956	Trilok Nath Seth	Tara Dandige	Nandu M. Natekar; R. D. Vimawala	J. Kour; Meena Shah	D. N. Dhongade; M. Gokhale
22nd	1957	Trilok Nath Seth	Prema Prashar	D. N. Dhongade; R. D. Vimawala	Prema Prashar; Sushila Kapadia	Chandrakant Deoras; Sushila Kapadia
23rd	1958	Nandu M. Natekar	Sushila Kapadia	Nandu M. Natekar; M. K. Bopardikar	Prema Prashar; Sushila Kapadia	Amrit Lal Diwan; Meena Shah
24th	1959	(Denmark) Erland Kops	Meena Shah	(Denmark) Erland Kops (India) R. D. Vimawala	(Malaysia) Cecilia Samuel (Malaysia) Tan Gaik Bee	(Denmark) Erland Kops (Malaysia) Tan Gaik Bee
25th	1960	Nandu M. Natekar	Meena Shah	Nandu M. Natekar; Chandrakant Deoras	Prema Prashar; Manda Kelkar	Chandrakant Deoras; Prema Prashar
26th	1961	Nandu M. Natekar	Meena Shah	Nandu M. Natekar; Chandrakant Deoras	Prema Prashar; Manda Kelkar	Nandu M. Natekar; Manda Kelkar
27th	1962	Suresh Goel	Meena Shah	A. I. Sheikh; P. J. Banphot	Sarojini Apte; Sunila Apte	Chandrakant Deoras; Manda Kelkar
28th	1963	Suresh Goel	Meena Shah	Nandu M. Natekar; Chandrakant Deoras	Sushila Kapadia; Manda Kelkar	Satiash Bhatia; Surinder Pannu
29th	1964	Suresh Goel	Meena Shah	Dipu Ghosh; Raman Ghosh	Meena Shah; Sunila Apte	Chandrakant Deoras; Meena Shah
30th	1965	Nandu M. Natekar	Meena Shah	Suresh Goel; Chandrakant Deoras	Meena Shah; Sarojini Apte	A. I. Sheikh; Shobha Moorthy
31st	1966	Dinesh Khanna	Sarojini Gogte	(Malaysia) Khor Cheng Chye (Malaysia) Lee Guan Choong	Shobha Moorthy; Manda Kelkar	Nandu M. Natekar; Manda Kelkar
32nd	1967	Suresh Goel	Sarojini Gogte	Dipu Ghosh; Raman Ghosh	Sarojini Gogte; Sunila Apte	Dipu Ghosh; Sushila Gogte
33rd	1968	Satish Bhatia	Damayanti Tambay	Raman Ghosh; Chandrakant Deoras	Damayanti Tambay; Joe Phillips	Raman Ghosh; Malati Tambe Vaidya
34th	1969	Dipu Ghosh	Damayanti Tambay	Dipu Ghosh; Raman Ghosh	Shobha Moorthy; Morin Mathias	Asif Parpia; Rafia Latif
35th	1970	Suresh Goel	Damayanti Tambay	Dipu Ghosh; Raman Ghosh	Shobha Moorthy; Morin Mathias	Nandu M. Natekar; Shobha Moorthy
36th	1971	Prakash Padukone	Shobha Moorthy	Dipu Ghosh; Suresh Goel	Shobha Moorthy; Morin Mathias	Asif Parpia; Morin Mathias
37th	1972	Prakash Padukone	Rafia Latif	Asif Parpia; Anil Pradhan	Shobha Moorthy; Morin Mathias	Satish Bhatia; Rafia Latif
38th	1973	Prakash Padukone	Ami M. Ghia	Prakash Padukone; Leroy D'Sa	Morin Mathias; Vatsala Ramamoorthy	Asif Parpia; Morin Mathias
39th	1974	Prakash Padukone	Ami M. Ghia	Raman Ghosh; Davinder Ahuja	Ami M. Ghia; Morin Mathias	Suresh Goel; Morin Mathias
40th	1975	Prakash Padukone	Ami M. Ghia	Suresh Goel; Leroy D'Sa	Ami M. Ghia; Morin Mathias	Suresh Goel; Morin Mathias
41st	1976	Prakash Padukone	Ami M. Ghia	Prakash Padukone; Leroy D'Sa	Ami M. Ghia; Morin D'Souza	Suresh Goel; Morin D'Souza
42nd	1977	Prakash Padukone	Kanwal Thakur Singh	Prakash Padukone; Leroy D'Sa	Latha Kailash; Noreen Padua	P. G. Chengappa; Uma Moorthy
43rd	1978	Prakash Padukone	Kanwal Thakur Singh	Pradeep S. Gandhe; Sanjay Sharma	Kanwal Thakur Singh; Ami M. Ghia	Satish Bhatia; Latha Kailash
44th	1979	Prakash Padukone	Ami M. Ghia	Prakash Padukone; Kiran Kaushik	Ami M. Ghia; Morin D'Souza	Parthasarathy; B. Raman
45th	1980	Syed Modi	Ami M. Ghia	Partho Ganguli; P. G. Chengappa	Radhika Bose; Ami M. Ghia	Leroy D'sa; Ami M. Ghia
46th	1981	Syed Modi	Madhumita Bisht	Partho Ganguli; Vikam Singh	Kanwal Thakur Singh; Sunita	Sanat Misra; Madhumita Goswami
47th	1982	Syed Modi	Radhika Bose	Uday Pawar; Pradeep S. Gandhe	Radhika Bose; Ami M. Ghia	Partho Ganguli; Ami M. Ghia
48th	1983	Syed Modi	Ami M. Ghia	Leroy D'Sa; Sanat Misra	Radhika Bose; Ami M. Ghia	P. G. Chengappa; Radhika Bose
49th	1984	Syed Modi	Madhumita Bisht	Leroy D'Sa; Sanat Misra	Ami M. Ghia; Deepti Thanekar	Pradeep S. Gandhe; Ami M. Ghia
50th	1985	Syed Modi	Madhumita Bisht	Partho Ganguli; Vikram Singh	Madhumita Bisht; Mallika Barua	Pradeep S. Gandhe; Ami M. Ghia
51st	1986	Syed Modi	Madhumita Bisht	Leroy D'Sa; Sanat Misra	Madhumita Bisht; Ami M. Ghia	Sanat Misra; Madhumita Bisht
52nd	1987	Syed Modi	Madhumita Bisht	Uday Pawar; Ravi Kunte	Madhumita Bisht; Ami M. Ghia	Sanat Misra; Madhumita Bisht
53rd	1988	U. Vimal Kumar	Madhumita Bisht	Prakash Padukone; Vinod Kumar	Madhumita Bisht; Ami M. Ghia	Sanat Misra; Madhumita Bisht
54th	1989	U. Vimal Kumar	Madhumita Bisht	Partho Ganguli; Vikam Singh	Madhumita Bisht; Ami M. Ghia	Harjeet Singh; Madhumita Bisht
55th	1990	George Thomas	Madhumita Bisht	Uday Pawar; Vinod Kumar	Madhumita Bisht; Sudha Padmanabhan	Harjeet Singh; Madhumita Bisht
56th	1991	Rajeev Bagga	Manjusha Pawangadkar	Uday Pawar; Vinod Kumar	Manjusha Pawangadkar; Archana Deodhar	Harjeet Singh; Sindhu Gulati
57th	1992	Rajeev Bagga	Manjusha Pawangadkar	George Thomas; Jaseel P. Ismail	Manjusha Pawangadkar; Archana Deodhar	Harjeet Singh; Sindhu Gulati
58th	1993	Dipankar Bhattacharjee	Manjusha Pawangadkar	Vinod Kumar; Bhushan Akut	Nancy Keith; Sindhu Gulati	Anil Nair; Archana Deodhar
59th	1994	Dipankar Bhattacharjee	P.V.V. Lakshmi	Vinod Kumar; Bhushan Akut	Nancy Keith; Sindhu Gulati	Vinod Kumar; Madhumita Bisht
60th	1995	Dipankar Bhattacharjee	P.V.V. Lakshmi	Jaseel P. Ismail; Vijaydeep Singh	P.V.V. Lakshmi; P. V. Sharada	Vinod Kumar; Madhumita Bisht
61st	1996	Pullela Gopichand	Manjusha Pawangadkar	Jaseel P. Ismail; Vijaydeep Singh	Manjusha Kanwar; Archana Deodhar	Vinod Kumar; Madhumita Bisht
62nd	1997	Pullela Gopichand	Aparna Popat	Rajeev Bagga; Vinod Kumar	Madhumita Bisht; Sindhu Gulati	Vinod Kumar; Madhumita Bisht
63rd	1998	Pullela Gopichand	Aparna Popat	Jaseel P. Ismail; Vincent Lobo	Manjusha Kanwar; Archana Deodhar	Vincent Lobo; Archana Deodhar
64th	1999	Pullela Gopichand	Aparna Popat	Markose Bristow; Vijaydeep Singh	Madhumita Bisht; P. V. V. Lakshmi	Jaseel P. Ismail; Manjusha Kanwar
65th	2000	Pullela Gopichand	Aparna Popat	Vincent Lobo; Jaseel P. Ismail	Jwala Gutta; Shruti Kurien	Vincent Lobo; Madhumita Bisht
66th	2001	Abhinn Shyam Gupta	Aparna Popat	Sanave Thomas; Valiyaveetil Diju	Neelima Chowdary; D. Swetha	Markose Bristow; Madhumita Bisht
67th	2002	Abhinn Shyam Gupta	Aparna Popat	Markose Bristow; Rupesh Kumar	Jwala Gutta; Shruti Kurien	Jaseel P. Ismail; Manjusha Kanwar
68th	2003	Chetan Anand	Aparna Popat	Markose Bristow; Rupesh Kumar	Jwala Gutta; Shruti Kurien	Pullela Gopichand; Jwala Gutta
69th	2004	Anup Sridhar	Aparna Popat	Rupesh Kumar; Sanave Thomas	Jwala Gutta; Shruti Kurien	Markose Bristow; B. R. Meenakshi
70th	2005	Anup Sridhar	Aparna Popat	Rupesh Kumar; Sanave Thomas	Jwala Gutta; Shruti Kurien	Valiyaveetil Diju; Jwala Gutta
71st	2006	Chetan Anand	Saina Nehwal	Rupesh Kumar; Sanave Thomas	Jwala Gutta; Shruti Kurien	Valiyaveetil Diju; Aparna Balan
72nd	2007	Chetan Anand	Saina Nehwal	Rupesh Kumar; Sanave Thomas	Jwala Gutta; Shruti Kurien	Valiyaveetil Diju; Jwala Gutta
73rd	2008	Arvind Bhat	Sayali Gokhale	Rupesh Kumar; Sanave Thomas	Jwala Gutta; Shruti Kurien	Valiyaveetil Diju; Jwala Gutta
74th	2009	Chetan Anand	Trupti Murgunde	Rupesh Kumar; Sanave Thomas	Jwala Gutta; Ashwini Ponnappa	Valiyaveetil Diju; Jwala Gutta
75th	2010	Arvind Bhat	Aditi Mutatkar	Rupesh Kumar; Sanave Thomas	Aparna Balan; Prajakta Sawant	Pranav Chopra; Prajakta Sawant
76th	2011	Sourabh Verma	P. V. Sindhu	Tarun Kona; Arun Vishnu	Prajakta Sawant; Pradnya Gadre	Arun Vishnu; Aparna Balan
77th	2012	Parupalli Kashyap	Sayali Gokhale	Manu Attri; B. Sumeeth Reddy	Aparna Balan; N. Sikki Reddy	Arun Vishnu; Aparna Balan
78th	2013	Srikanth Kidambi	P. V. Sindhu	Pranav Chopra; Akshay Dewalkar	Jwala Gutta; Ashwini Ponnappa	Arun Vishnu; Aparna Balan
79th	2014	B. Sai Praneeth	Ruthvika Gadde	Manu Attri; B. Sumeeth Reddy	Pradnya Gadre; N. Sikki Reddy	Arun Vishnu; Aparna Balan
80th	2015	Sameer Verma	P. C. Thulasi	Pranav Chopra; Akshay Dewalkar	Pradnya Gadre; N. Sikki Reddy	Arun Vishnu; Aparna Balan
81st	2016	Sourabh Verma	Rituparna Das	Satwiksairaj Rankireddy; Chirag Shetty	Aparna Balan; Prajakta Sawant	Satwiksairaj Rankireddy; K. Maneesha
82nd	2017	Prannoy H. S.	Saina Nehwal	Manu Attri; B. Sumeeth Reddy	Ashwini Ponnappa; N. Sikki Reddy	Satwiksairaj Rankireddy; Ashwini Ponnappa
83rd	2018	Sourabh Verma	Saina Nehwal	Pranav Chopra; Chirag Shetty	Shikha Gautam; Ashwini Bhat	Manu Attri; K. Maneesha
84th	2023	Mithun Manjunath	Anupama Upadhyaya	Kushal Raj S. Prakash Raj S.	Treesa Jolly; Gayatri Gopichand	T. Hemanagendra Babu; Kanika Kanwal
85th	2023	Chirag Sen	Anmol Kharb	K. Pruthvi Roy; Suraj Goala	Shruti Mishra; Priya Devi Konjengbam	Dhruv Kapila; Tanisha Crasto
86th	2024	Raghu Mariswamy	Devika Sihag	Arsh Mohammad; Sanskar Saraswat	Arathi Sara Sunil; Varshini V. S.	Ayush Agarwal; Shruti Mishra
87th	2025	Rithvik Sanjeevi	Surya Charishma Tamiri	Hariharan Amsakarunan; Ruban Rethinasabapathi	Shikha Gautam; Ashwini Bhat	Sathwik Reddy Kanapuram; Radhika Sharma

== See also ==
- Badminton in India
- Badminton Association of India
- India national badminton team
