= 1965 Asian Badminton Championships – Men's team =

Badminton championship in Lucknow, India

Men's team at the 1965 Asian Badminton Championships
- Venue: Babu Banarasi Das Indoor Stadium
- Location: Lucknow, India
- Dates: 30 October – 5 November 1965

The men's team tournament at the 1965 Asian Badminton Championships, also known as the Tunku Abdul Rahman Cup (Malay: Piala Tunku Abdul Rahman) took place from 30 October to 5 November 1965 at Babu Banarasi Das Indoor Stadium in Lucknow, Uttar Pradesh, India. A total of 8 countries took part in the event. Burma and Pakistan withdrew from the event.

== Bracket ==
Quarter-finals
Thailand	5
Nepal	0
Japan	5
Ceylon	0
India	5
Philippines	0
Malaysia	5
Hong Kong	0

Semi-finals
Thailand	3
Japan	2
India	2
Malaysia	3

Final
Thailand	1
Malaysia	4

== Quarter-finals ==
Malaysia
5
Babu Banarasi Das Indoor Stadium
30 October 1965

Hong Kong
0

			1	2	3
1	(Malaysia) (Hong Kong)	Omar Manap; Koo Man For	11; 15	15; 9	15; 11
2	(Malaysia) (Hong Kong)	Yew Cheng Hoe; Wong Cheong Leong	15; 9	15; 3
3	(Malaysia) (Hong Kong)	Tan Yee Khan / Teh Kew San; Koo Man For / Wong Fai Hung	15; 5	18; 14
4	(Malaysia) (Hong Kong)	Omar Manap; Wong Cheong Leong	8; 15	15; 12	15; 9
5	(Malaysia) (Hong Kong)	Yew Cheng Hoe; Koo Man For	12; 15	15; 6	15; 1

India
5
Babu Banarasi Das Indoor Stadium
31 October 1965

Philippines
0

			1	2	3
1	(India) (Philippines)	Suresh Goel; Armando Yanga	15; 3	15; 3
2	(India) (Philippines)	Dipu Ghosh; Daniel So	15; 10	15; 0
3	(India) (Philippines)	Raman Ghosh / Nandu Natekar; Conrado Co / Oscar Yanga	15; 6	15; 3
4	(India) (Philippines)	Suresh Goel; Daniel So	15; 7	15; 2
5	(India) (Philippines)	Dipu Ghosh; Armando Yanga				w/o

Thailand
5
Babu Banarasi Das Indoor Stadium
1 November 1965

Nepal
0

			1	2	3
1	(Thailand) (Nepal)	Sangob Rattanusorn; Gyan Bahadur Khadka	15; 1	15; 0
2	(Thailand) (Nepal)	Somsook Boonyasukhanonda; Singha Bahadur Basnyat	15; 12	15; 0
3	(Thailand) (Nepal)	Narong Bhornchima / Raphi Kanchanaraphi; Buddhi Rana / Hemant Rana	15; 1	15; 2
4	(Thailand) (Nepal)	Sangob Rattanusorn; Singha Bahadur Basnyat	15; 1	15; 2
5	(Thailand) (Nepal)	Somsook Boonyasukhanonda; Gyan Bahadur Khadka	15; 2	15; 4

Japan
5
Babu Banarasi Das Indoor Stadium
2 November 1965

Ceylon
0

			1	2	3
1	(Japan) (Dominion of Ceylon)	Takeshi Anzawa; L. R. Ariyananda	15; 4	15; 3
2	(Japan) (Dominion of Ceylon)	Yoshinori Itagaki; Gerry Chandrasena	15; 5	15; 4
3	(Japan) (Dominion of Ceylon)	Koichi Ōtake / Takeshi Anzawa; Gerry Chandrasena / Ranjit de Silva	15; 5	15; 3
4	(Japan) (Dominion of Ceylon)	Takeshi Anzawa; Gerry Chandrasena				w/o
5	(Japan) (Dominion of Ceylon)	Yoshinori Itagaki; L. R. Ariyananda				w/o

== Semi-finals ==
Malaysia
3
Babu Banarasi Das Indoor Stadium
3 November 1965

India
2

			1	2	3
1	(Malaysia) (India)	Teh Kew San; Suresh Goel	15; 18	15; 7	15; 7
2	(Malaysia) (India)	Yew Cheng Hoe; Dinesh Khanna	17; 15	15; 10
3	(Malaysia) (India)	Tan Yee Khan / Teh Kew San; Dipu Ghosh / Nandu Natekar	15; 12	18; 13
4	(Malaysia) (India)	Teh Kew San; Dinesh Khanna				w/o
5	(Malaysia) (India)	Yew Cheng Hoe; Suresh Goel				w/o

Thailand
3
Babu Banarasi Das Indoor Stadium
4 November 1965

Japan
2

			1	2	3
1	(Thailand) (Japan)	Narong Bhornchima; Takeshi Yazawa	18; 13	15; 12
2	(Thailand) (Japan)	Sangob Rattanusorn; Yoshinori Itagaki	5; 15	9; 15
3	(Thailand) (Japan)	Chavalert Chumkum / Raphi Kanchanaraphi; Yoshinori Itagaki / Koichi Ōtake	15; 8	15; 17	17; 14
4	(Thailand) (Japan)	Sangob Rattanusorn; Takeshi Yazawa	15; 10	15; 8
5	(Thailand) (Japan)	Narong Bhornchima; Yoshinori Itagaki				w/o

== Final ==
Malaysia
4
Babu Banarasi Das Indoor Stadium
5 November 1965

Thailand
1

			1	2	3
1	(Malaysia) (Thailand)	Yew Cheng Hoe; Narong Bhornchima	15; 10	15; 6
2	(Malaysia) (Thailand)	Teh Kew San; Sangob Rattanusorn	18; 14	15; 9
3	(Malaysia) (Thailand)	Tan Yee Khan / Teh Kew San; Chavalert Chumkum / Raphi Kanchanaraphi	15; 11	15; 11
4	(Malaysia) (Thailand)	Yew Cheng Hoe; Sangob Rattanusorn	15; 6	17; 14
5	(Malaysia) (Thailand)	Teh Kew San; Narong Bhornchima				w/o
