= India national badminton team =

Indian national badminton team

India
- Association: Badminton Association of India
- Confederation: Badminton Asia
- President: Himanta Biswa Sarma

BWF ranking
- Current ranking: 7 ▲3 (6 October 2026)
- Highest ranking: 5 (July 2023)

Sudirman Cup
- Appearances: 16 (first in 1991)
- Best result: Quarter-finals (2011, 2017)

Thomas Cup
- Appearances: 15 (first in 1952)
- Best result: Champions (2022)

Uber Cup
- Appearances: 10 (first in 1957)
- Best result: Semi-finals (1957, 2014, 2016)

Asian Mixed Championship
- Appearances: 3 (first in 2017)
- Best result: Semi-finals (2023)

Asian Men's Championship
- Appearances: 14 (first in 1965)
- Best result: Runners-up (1983)

Asian Women's Championship
- Appearances: 4 (first in 2016)
- Best result: Champions (2024)

The India national badminton team is the representative of India in international men's and women's badminton team tournaments. It is governed by the Badminton Association of India. The men's team won the Thomas Cup in 2022, while the women's team have been semi-finalists at the Uber Cup in 2014 and 2016. The team competed in the 2011 Sudirman Cup and shared the fifth rank and also repeated the performance in 2017.

The Indian team is currently 8th in the world rankings. The players have won 3 medals at the Summer Olympics, 16 at the World Championships, 7 at the Asian Games, 19 at the Asian Championships and 25 at the Commonwealth Games.

== Coaches ==
Years	Coach	Role	Ref
2020–present	(South Korea) Park Tae-sang	NCE Coach	
2025–present	(Malaysia) Tan Kim Her	Doubles Coach	
2025–present	(Indonesia) Irwansyah Adi Pratama	Women's Singles Coach	

== Medal table ==
=== Individual ===
Tournament	1st place, gold medalist(s)	2nd place, silver medalist(s)	3rd place, bronze medalist(s)	Total
Olympic Games	0	1	2	3
World Championships	1	4	11	16
Asian Games	1	1	5	7
Asian Championships	2	1	16	19
Commonwealth Games	9	5	11	25
South Asian Games	24	21	3	48
Defunct
World Games	0	0	1	1
World Cup	1	0	1	2
Total	38	33	50	121

=== Team ===
Tournament	Team	1st place, gold medalist(s)	2nd place, silver medalist(s)	3rd place, bronze medalist(s)	Total
Thomas Cup	M	1	0	1	2
Uber Cup	F	0	0	2	2
Sudirman Cup	X	0	0	0	0
Commonwealth Games	M	0	1	0	1
Commonwealth Games	F	0	0	1	1
Commonwealth Games	X	1	2	1	4
Asian Games	M	0	1	4	5
Asian Games	F	0	0	2	2
Asian Team Championships	M	0	1	3	4
Asian Team Championships	F	1	0	0	1
Asian Mixed Team Championships	X	0	0	1	1
South Asian Games	M	5	0	0	5
South Asian Games	F	5	0	0	5
Total		13	5	15	33

== Current rankings ==
As of April 2026

=== Men's singles ===
World Rank	Player
10	Lakshya Sen
18	Ayush Shetty
30	Srikanth Kidambi
35	Prannoy H. S.
43	Tharun Mannepalli
48	Kiran George
53	Priyanshu Rajawat
56	Mithun Manjunath
65	Manraj Singh
66	Sankar Subramanian
76	Rithvik Sanjeevi
91	Saneeth Dayanand
96	Alap Mishra
98	Sathish Karunakaran

=== Women's singles ===
World Rank	Player
5	P. V. Sindhu
21	Tanvi Sharma
24	Unnati Hooda
35	Devika Sihag
44	Rakshitha Ramraj
47	Anupama Upadhyaya
49	Malvika Bansod
53	Isharani Baruah
55	Tasnim Mir
56	Anmol Kharb
57	Shriyanshi Valishetty
58	Aakarshi Kashyap
68	Tanya Hemanth
80	Shreya Lele
87	Ashmita Chaliha
93	Ira Sharma
94	Mansi Singh

=== Men's doubles ===
World Rank	Players
4	Chirag Shetty; Satwiksairaj Rankireddy
24	Arjun M. R. Hariharan Amsakarunan
44	Pruthvi Roy Sai Pratheek K.

=== Women's doubles ===
World Rank	Players
13	Treesa Jolly; Gayatri Gopichand
47	Shruti Mishra; Priya Konjengbam
50	Rutaparna Panda; Swetaparna Panda
51	Simran Singhi; Kavipriya Selvam

=== Mixed doubles ===
World karu	Players
18	Tanisha Crasto; Dhruv Kapila
36	Rohan Kapoor; Ruthvika Gadde
45	Aadya Variyath; Sathish Karunakaran
46	Ashith Surya; Amrutha Pramuthesh

== Highest rankings ==
Note: Active players in bold

Player	Discipline	Highest
Prakash Padukone **Srikanth Kidambi**	MS	1
Saina Nehwal	WS	1
**Satwiksairaj Rankireddy**; **Chirag Shetty**	MD	1
**Treesa Jolly**; **Gayatri Gopichand**	WD	9
Jwala Gutta; Valiyaveetil Diju	XD	6
India	Team	5

== Top 10 rankers ==
Note: Active players in bold

Player	Best Ranking	Olympic Games			World Championship		
Player	Best Ranking	1st place, gold medalist(s)	2nd place, silver medalist(s)	3rd place, bronze medalist(s)	1st place, gold medalist(s)	2nd place, silver medalist(s)	3rd place, bronze medalist(s)
Men's Singles
Prakash Padukone	1	—	—	—	—	—	1
**Srikanth Kidambi**	1	—	—	—	—	1	—
**Lakshya Sen**	6	—	—	—	—	—	1
**Prannoy H. S.**	6	—	—	—	—	—	1
B. Sai Praneeth	10	—	—	—	—	—	1
Women's Singles
Saina Nehwal	1	—	—	1	—	1	1
**P. V. Sindhu**	2	—	1	1	1	2	2
Men's Doubles
**Satwiksairaj Rankireddy**; **Chirag Shetty**	1	—	—	—	—	—	2
Women's Doubles
**Treesa Jolly**; **Gayatri Gopichand**	9	—	—	—	—	—	1
Jwala Gutta; Ashwini Ponnappa	10	—	—	—	—	—	1
Mixed Doubles
Jwala Gutta; Valiyaveetil Diju	6	—	—	—	—	—	—

== Individual record ==
=== Olympic Games ===
Year	Host	Player	Category	Medal
2012	(United Kingdom) London	Saina Nehwal	Women's singles	3rd place, bronze medalist(s)
2016	(Brazil) Rio de Janeiro	P. V. Sindhu	Women's singles	2nd place, silver medalist(s)
2020	(Japan) Tokyo	P. V. Sindhu	Women's singles	3rd place, bronze medalist(s)

=== World Championships ===
Year	Player(s)	Category	Medal
1983	Prakash Padukone	Men's singles	3rd place, bronze medalist(s)
2011	Jwala Gutta; Ashwini Ponnappa	Women's doubles	3rd place, bronze medalist(s)
2013	P. V. Sindhu	Women's singles	3rd place, bronze medalist(s)
2014	P. V. Sindhu	Women's singles	3rd place, bronze medalist(s)
2015	Saina Nehwal	Women's singles	2nd place, silver medalist(s)
2017	P. V. Sindhu	Women's singles	2nd place, silver medalist(s)
2017	Saina Nehwal	Women's singles	3rd place, bronze medalist(s)
2018	P. V. Sindhu	Women's singles	2nd place, silver medalist(s)
2019	P. V. Sindhu	Women's singles	1st place, gold medalist(s)
2019	B. Sai Praneeth	Men's singles	3rd place, bronze medalist(s)
2021	Srikanth Kidambi	Men's singles	2nd place, silver medalist(s)
2021	Lakshya Sen	Men's singles	3rd place, bronze medalist(s)
2022	Chirag Shetty; Satwiksairaj Rankireddy	Men's doubles	3rd place, bronze medalist(s)
2023	Prannoy H. S.	Men's singles	3rd place, bronze medalist(s)
2025	Chirag Shetty; Satwiksairaj Rankireddy	Men's doubles	3rd place, bronze medalist(s)
2026	Treesa Jolly; Gayatri Gopichand	Women's doubles	3rd place, bronze medalist(s)

=== Super Series / World Tour Finals ===
Year	Player	Category	Medal
2009	Jwala Gutta; Valiyaveetil Diju	Mixed doubles	2nd place, silver medalist(s)
2011	Saina Nehwal	Women's singles	2nd place, silver medalist(s)
2017	P. V. Sindhu	Women's singles	2nd place, silver medalist(s)
2018	P. V. Sindhu	Women's singles	1st place, gold medalist(s)
2021	P. V. Sindhu	Women's singles	2nd place, silver medalist(s)

=== Asian Games ===
Year	Player(s)	Category	Medal
1982	Syed Modi	Men's singles	3rd place, bronze medalist(s)
1982	Leroy D'Sa; Pradeep Gandhe	Men's doubles	3rd place, bronze medalist(s)
1982	Leroy D'Sa; Kanwal Thakar Singh	Mixed doubles	3rd place, bronze medalist(s)
2018	P. V. Sindhu	Women's singles	2nd place, silver medalist(s)
2018	Saina Nehwal	Women's singles	3rd place, bronze medalist(s)
2022	Chirag Shetty; Satwiksairaj Rankireddy	Men's doubles	1st place, gold medalist(s)
2022	Prannoy H. S.	Men's singles	3rd place, bronze medalist(s)

=== Asian Championships ===
Year	Player(s)	Category	Medal
1965	Dinesh Khanna	Men's singles	1st place, gold medalist(s)
1965	Suresh Goel	Men's singles	3rd place, bronze medalist(s)
1965	Meena Shah	Women's singles	3rd place, bronze medalist(s)
1965	Sarojini Apte	Women's singles	3rd place, bronze medalist(s)
1965	Owen Roncon; Sarojini Apte	Mixed doubles	3rd place, bronze medalist(s)
1965	A. I. Sheikh; Achala Karnik	Mixed doubles	3rd place, bronze medalist(s)
1969	Dinesh Khanna	Men's singles	3rd place, bronze medalist(s)
1976	Prakash Padukone	Men's singles	3rd place, bronze medalist(s)
2000	Pullela Gopichand	Men's singles	3rd place, bronze medalist(s)
2007	Anup Sridhar	Men's singles	3rd place, bronze medalist(s)
2010	Saina Nehwal	Women's singles	3rd place, bronze medalist(s)
2014	P. V. Sindhu	Women's singles	3rd place, bronze medalist(s)
2014	Jwala Gutta; Ashwini Ponnappa	Women's doubles	3rd place, bronze medalist(s)
2016	Saina Nehwal	Women's singles	3rd place, bronze medalist(s)
2018	Prannoy H. S.	Men's singles	3rd place, bronze medalist(s)
2018	Saina Nehwal	Women's singles	3rd place, bronze medalist(s)
2022	P. V. Sindhu	Women's singles	3rd place, bronze medalist(s)
2023	Chirag Shetty; Satwiksairaj Rankireddy	Men's doubles	1st place, gold medalist(s)
2026	Ayush Shetty	Men's singles	2nd place, silver medalist(s)

=== Commonwealth Games ===
Year	Player(s)	Category	Medal
1966	Dinesh Khanna	Men's singles	3rd place, bronze medalist(s)
1978	Prakash Padukone	Men's singles	1st place, gold medalist(s)
1978	Ami Ghia; Kanwal Thakar Singh	Women's doubles	3rd place, bronze medalist(s)
1982	Syed Modi	Men's singles	1st place, gold medalist(s)
1998	Aparna Popat	Women's singles	2nd place, silver medalist(s)
1998	Pullela Gopichand	Men's singles	3rd place, bronze medalist(s)
2002	Aparna Popat	Women's singles	3rd place, bronze medalist(s)
2006	Chetan Anand	Men's singles	3rd place, bronze medalist(s)
2010	Saina Nehwal	Women's singles	1st place, gold medalist(s)
2010	Jwala Gutta; Ashwini Ponnappa	Women's doubles	1st place, gold medalist(s)
2010	Parupalli Kashyap	Men's singles	3rd place, bronze medalist(s)
2014	Parupalli Kashyap	Men's singles	1st place, gold medalist(s)
2014	Jwala Gutta; Ashwini Ponnappa	Women's doubles	2nd place, silver medalist(s)
2014	Gurusai Dutt	Men's singles	3rd place, bronze medalist(s)
2014	P. V. Sindhu	Women's singles	3rd place, bronze medalist(s)
2018	Saina Nehwal	Women's singles	1st place, gold medalist(s)
2018	Srikanth Kidambi	Men's singles	2nd place, silver medalist(s)
2018	P. V. Sindhu	Women's singles	2nd place, silver medalist(s)
2018	Chirag Shetty; Satwiksairaj Rankireddy	Men's doubles	2nd place, silver medalist(s)
2018	Ashwini Ponnappa; N. Sikki Reddy	Women's doubles	3rd place, bronze medalist(s)
2022	Lakshya Sen	Men's singles	1st place, gold medalist(s)
2022	P. V. Sindhu	Women's singles	1st place, gold medalist(s)
2022	Chirag Shetty; Satwiksairaj Rankireddy	Men's doubles	1st place, gold medalist(s)
2022	Srikanth Kidambi	Men's singles	3rd place, bronze medalist(s)
2022	Treesa Jolly; Gayatri Gopichand	Women's doubles	3rd place, bronze medalist(s)

=== South Asian Games ===
Year	Player(s)	Category	Medal
2004	Chetan Anand	Men's singles	1st place, gold medalist(s)
2004	Trupti Murgunde	Women's singles	1st place, gold medalist(s)
2004	Rupesh Kumar K. T. Marcos Bristow	Men's doubles	1st place, gold medalist(s)
2004	Jwala Gutta; Shruti Kurien	Women's doubles	1st place, gold medalist(s)
2004	Jaseel P. Ismail; Jwala Gutta	Mixed doubles	1st place, gold medalist(s)
2004	Abhinn Shyam Gupta	Men's singles	2nd place, silver medalist(s)
2004	B. R. Meenakshi	Women's singles	2nd place, silver medalist(s)
2004	Jaseel P. Ismail; JBS Vidyadhar	Men's doubles	2nd place, silver medalist(s)
2004	Fathima Nazneen; Manjusha Kanwar	Women's doubles	2nd place, silver medalist(s)
2004	Marcos Bristow; Manjusha Kanwar	Mixed doubles	2nd place, silver medalist(s)
2006	Chetan Anand	Men's singles	1st place, gold medalist(s)
2006	Trupti Murgunde	Women's singles	1st place, gold medalist(s)
2006	Rupesh Kumar K. T. Sanave Thomas	Men's doubles	1st place, gold medalist(s)
2006	Jaseel P. Ismail; Jwala Gutta	Women's doubles	1st place, gold medalist(s)
2006	Valiyaveetil Diju; Jwala Gutta	Mixed doubles	1st place, gold medalist(s)
2010	Chetan Anand	Men's singles	1st place, gold medalist(s)
2010	Sayali Gokhale	Women's singles	1st place, gold medalist(s)
2010	Rupesh Kumar K. T. Sanave Thomas	Men's doubles	1st place, gold medalist(s)
2010	Aparna Balan; Shruti Kurien	Women's doubles	1st place, gold medalist(s)
2010	Valiyaveetil Diju; Ashwini Ponnappa	Mixed doubles	1st place, gold medalist(s)
2016	Srikanth Kidambi	Men's singles	1st place, gold medalist(s)
2016	Ruthvika Gadde	Women's singles	1st place, gold medalist(s)
2016	Manu Attri; B. Sumeeth Reddy	Men's doubles	1st place, gold medalist(s)
2016	Jwala Gutta; Ashwini Ponnappa	Women's doubles	1st place, gold medalist(s)
2016	Pranav Chopra; N. Sikki Reddy	Mixed doubles	1st place, gold medalist(s)
2019	Siril Verma	Men's singles	1st place, gold medalist(s)
2019	Ashmita Chaliha	Women's singles	1st place, gold medalist(s)
2019	Krishna Prasad Garaga; Dhruv Kapila	Men's doubles	1st place, gold medalist(s)
2019	Dhruv Kapila; Meghana Jakkampudi	Mixed doubles	1st place, gold medalist(s)

== Senior team record ==
=== Thomas Cup ===
Year	Round	Pos
1949	Did not qualify	
1952	Second round	3rd
1955	Second round	3rd
1958	Did not qualify	
1961	Did not qualify	
1964	Did not qualify	
1967	Did not qualify	
1970	Did not qualify	
1973	First round inter-zone	5th
1976	Did not qualify	
1979	Semi-finals	3rd
1982	Did not qualify	
1984	Did not qualify	
1986	Did not qualify	
1988	Group stage	8th
1990	Did not qualify	
1992	Did not qualify	
1994	Did not qualify	
1996	Did not qualify	
1998	Did not qualify	
2000	Group stage	7th
2002	Did not qualify	
2004	Did not qualify	
2006	Quarter-finals	—N/a
2008	Did not qualify	
2010	Quarter-finals	—N/a
2012	Did not qualify	
2014	Group stage	11th
2016	Group stage	13th
2018	Group stage	10th
2020	Quarter-finals	5th
2022	**Champions**	**1st**
2024	Quarter-finals	8th
2026	Semi-finals	**3rd**
2028	To be determined	
2030	To be determined	

=== Uber Cup ===
Year	Round	Pos
1957	First round	**3rd**
1960	First round	5th
1963	Did not qualify	
1966	Did not qualify	
1969	Did not qualify	
1972	Did not qualify	
1975	Did not qualify	
1978	Did not qualify	
1981	Did not qualify	
1984	Did not qualify	
1986	Did not qualify	
1988	Did not qualify	
1990	Did not qualify	
1992	Did not qualify	
1994	Did not qualify	
1996	Did not qualify	
1998	Did not qualify	
2000	Did not qualify	
2002	Did not qualify	
2004	Did not qualify	
2006	Did not qualify	
2008	Did not qualify	
2010	Quarter-finals	—N/a
2012	Did not qualify	
2014	Semi-finals	**3rd**
2016	Semi-finals	**3rd**
2018	Group stage	11th
2020	Quarter-finals	8th
2022	Quarter-finals	8th
2024	Quarter-finals	7th
2026	Group stage	11th
2028	To be determined	
2030	To be determined	

=== Sudirman Cup ===
Year	Round	Pos
1989	Withdrew	
1991	Group stage	19th
1993	Group stage	18th
1995	Group stage	20th
1997	Group stage	19th
1999	Group stage	16th
2001	Group stage	17th
2003	Group stage	16th
2005	Group stage	18th
2007	Group stage	18th
2009	Group stage	17th
2011	Quarter-finals	—N/a
2013	Group stage	**10th**
2015	Group stage	**10th**
2017	Quarter-finals	—N/a
2019	Group stage	12th
2021	Group stage	12th
2023	Group stage	11th
2025	Group stage	11th
2027	To be determined	
2029	To be determined	

=== Commonwealth Games ===
==== Mixed team ====
Year	Round	Position
1978	Group stage	—N/a
1982	Group stage	—N/a
1986	Did not enter	
1990	Group stage	—N/a
1994	Did not enter	
2002	Group stage	—N/a
2006	Third place	3rd
2010	Runners-up	2nd
2014	Fourth place	4th
2018	**Champions**	**1st**
2022	Runners-up	2nd
2026	Event not held	
2030	To be determined	
2034	To be determined	

==== Men's team ====
Year	Round	Position
1998	**Runners-up**	**2nd**

==== Women's team ====
Year	Round	Position
1998	**Semi-finals**	**3rd**

=== Asian Games ===
==== Men's team ====
Year	Round	Position
1962	Did not enter	
1966	Withdrew	
1970	Did not enter	
1974	Third place	3rd
1978	Quarter-finals	—N/a
1982	Semi-finals	4th
1986	Semi-finals	4th
1990	Did not enter	
1994	Did not enter	
1998	Did not enter	
2002	Did not enter	
2006	Group stage	9th
2010	Round of 16	—N/a
2014	Round of 16	—N/a
2018	Quarter-finals	—N/a
2022	**Runners-up**	**2nd**
2026	To be determined	
2030	To be determined	
2034	To be determined	
2038	To be determined	

==== Women's team ====
Year	Round	Position
1962	Did not enter	
1966	Did not enter	
1970	Did not enter	
1974	Did not enter	
1978	Did not enter	
1982	Semi-finals	4th
1986	Quarter-finals	5th
1990	Did not enter	
1994	Did not enter	
1998	Did not enter	
2002	Did not enter	
2006	Did not enter	
2010	Round of 16	—N/a
2014	**Semi-finals**	**3rd**
2018	Quarter-finals	—N/a
2022	Quarter-finals	—N/a
2026	Quarter-finals	—N/a
2030	To be determined	
2034	To be determined	
2038	To be determined	

=== Asian Championships ===
==== Mixed team ====
Year	Round	Position
2017	Quarter-finals	—N/a
2019	Group stage	—N/a
2023	**Semi-finals**	**3rd**
2025	Quarter-finals	6th
2027		
2029		

==== Men's team ====
Year	Round	Position
1962	Did not enter	
1965	Semi-finals	3rd
1969	Quarter-finals	—N/a
1971	Round of 16	—N/a
1976	Round of 16	—N/a
1983	**Runners-up**	**2nd**
1985	Quarter-finals	—N/a
1987	Group stage	—N/a
1989	Group stage	—N/a
1993	Group stage	—N/a
2016	Semi-finals	4th
2018	Quarter-finals	—N/a
2020	Semi-finals	3rd
2022	Group stage	6th
2024	Quarter-finals	8th
2026	Quarter-finals	8th
2028	To be determined	
2030	To be determined	

==== Women's team ====
Year	Round	Position
2016	Quarter-finals	—N/a
2018	Quarter-finals	—N/a
2020	Did not enter	
2022	Group stage	6th
2024	**Champions**	**1st**
2026	Quarter-finals	7th
2028	To be determined	
2030	To be determined	

=== South Asian Games ===
==== Men's team ====
Year	Round	Pos
2004	**Champions**	**1st**
2006	**Champions**	**1st**
2010	**Champions**	**1st**
2016	**Champions**	**1st**
2019	**Champions**	**1st**
2026	To be determined	

==== Women's team ====
Year	Round	Pos
2004	**Champions**	**1st**
2006	**Champions**	**1st**
2010	**Champions**	**1st**
2016	**Champions**	**1st**
2019	**Champions**	**1st**
2026	To be determined	

Note: Red border indicates tournament was held on home soil.

== Junior team record ==
=== World Junior Championships ===
Year	Round	Position
2000	Group stage	13th
2002	Group stage	9th
2004	Group stage	11th
2006	Group stage	8th
2007	Group stage	8th
2008	Semi-finals	4th
2009	Group stage	7th
2010	Group stage	9th
2011	Group stage	6th
2012	Group stage	9th
2013	Group stage	14th
2014	Group stage	13th
2015	Group stage	9th
2016	Quarter-finals	8th
2017	Quarter-finals	6th
2018	Quarter-finals	6th
2019	Group stage	12th
2020	Cancelled due to COVID-19 pandemic	
2021	Cancelled due to COVID-19 pandemic	
2022	Group stage	13th
2023	Quarter-finals	7th
2024	Quarter-finals	6th
2025	Semi-finals	3rd
2026	Group stage	13th of 47

=== Asia Junior Championships ===
==== Men's team ====
Year	Round	Position
1997	Quarter-finals	—N/a
1998	Quarter-finals	—N/a
1999	Quarter-finals	—N/a
2000	Quarter-finals	—N/a
2001	Quarter-finals	—N/a
2002	Quarter-finals	—N/a
2004	Round of 16	—N/a
2005	Quarter-finals	—N/a

==== Women's team ====
Year	Round	Position
1997	Round of 16	—N/a
1998	Quarter-finals	—N/a
1999	Quarter-finals	—N/a
2000	Quarter-finals	—N/a
2001	Quarter-finals	—N/a
2002	Semi-finals	3rd
2004	Quarter-finals	—N/a
2005	Quarter-finals	—N/a

==== Mixed team ====
Year	Round	Position
2006	Round of 16	—N/a
2007	Group stage	—N/a
2008	Group stage	—N/a
2009	Quarter-finals	—N/a
2010	Quarter-finals	—N/a
2011	Semi-finals	3rd
2012	Group stage	—N/a
2013	Group stage	—N/a
2014	Group stage	—N/a
2015	Quarter-finals	—N/a
2016	Quarter-finals	—N/a
2017	Group stage	—N/a
2018	Quarter-finals	—N/a
2019	Quarter-finals	—N/a
2023	Quarter-finals	—N/a
2024	Quarter-finals	6th
2025	Quarter-finals	6th
2026	Quarter-finals	5th

Note: Red border indicates tournament was held on home soil.

== Notable former players ==
- Prakash Padukone
- Pullela Gopichand
- Saina Nehwal
- Jwala Gutta
- Syed Modi
- Parupalli Kashyap
- Ami Ghia
- Aparna Popat
- P. V. V. Lakshmi
- Madhumita Bisht
- Kanwal Thakar Singh
- Dinesh Khanna
- Leroy D'Sa
- U. Vimal Kumar
- Chetan Anand
- B. Sai Praneeth

== See also ==
- Badminton in India
