= 1973 Thomas Cup squads =

This article lists the squads for the 1973 Thomas Cup participating teams. The age listed for each player is on 25 May 1973 which was the first day of the tournament.

== Teams ==
=== Canada ===
Six players represented Canada in the 1973 Thomas Cup.

Name	DoB/Age
Jamie Paulson	26 April 1948 (aged 25)
Yves Paré	25 May 1945 (aged 28)
Wayne Macdonnell	28 June 1940 (aged 32)
Bruce Rollick	11 April 1943 (aged 30)
Raphi Kanchanaraphi	6 November 1936 (aged 36)
Channarong Ratanaseangsuang	1939 (aged 33–34)

=== Denmark ===
Six players represented Denmark in the 1973 Thomas Cup.

Name	DoB/Age
Elo Hansen	1945 (aged 27–28)
Svend Pri	18 March 1945 (aged 28)
Tom Bacher	16 November 1941 (aged 31)
Poul Petersen	1950 (aged 22–23)
Henning Borch	9 March 1938 (aged 35)
Flemming Delfs	7 September 1951 (aged 21)

=== India ===
Six players represented India in the 1973 Thomas Cup.

Name	DoB/Age
Prakash Padukone	10 June 1955 (aged 17)
Dipu Ghosh	17 June 1940 (aged 32)
Raman Ghosh	15 August 1942 (aged 30)
Asif Parpia	1945 (aged 27–28)
Suresh Goel	20 June 1943 (aged 29)
Davinder Ahuja	25 December 1949 (aged 23)

=== Indonesia ===
Six players represented Indonesia in the 1973 Thomas Cup.

Name	DoB/Age
Rudy Hartono	18 August 1949 (aged 23)
Muljadi	11 September 1942 (aged 30)
Amril Nurman	1948 (aged 24–25)
Ade Chandra	4 February 1950 (aged 23)
Christian Hadinata	11 December 1949 (aged 23)
Tjun Tjun	4 October 1952 (aged 20)

=== Thailand ===
Eight players represented Thailand in the 1973 Thomas Cup.

Name	DoB/Age
Sangob Rattanusorn	1943 (aged 29–30)
Bandid Jaiyen	5 March 1950 (aged 23)
Chaisak Thongdejsri	10 May 1947 (aged 26)
Chirasak Champakao	1945 (aged 27–28)
Pornchai Sakuntaniyom	1950 (aged 22–23)
Preecha Sopajaree	1951 (aged 21–22)
Sila Ulao	1945 (aged 27–28)
Thongchai Pongpul	1945 (aged 28–29)
