= Tamil Nadu Badminton Association =

TamilNadu Badminton Association
- Sport: Badminton
- Jurisdiction: India
- Abbreviation: TNBA
- Founded: 1960
- Headquarters: Chennai, TamilNadu
- President: Anbumani Ramadoss
- Secretary: V.E.Arunachalam

Official website
- tnba.co

Tamil Nadu Badminton Association (TNBA) is the central governing body of badminton in Tamil Nadu formed as back as late 1960’s. TNBA current president is Anbumani Ramadoss and the Secretary is V.E.Arunachalam. TNBA is duly recognized by Badminton Association of India. It is headquartered in Chennai, Tamil Nadu.

== Tournaments ==
- TamilNadu Badminton Super League – TNBSL
- Junior Badminton League – JBL
- Tamilnadu State Senior Ranking Tournament
- Tamilnadu State Under 13 Ranking Tournament
- Tamilnadu State Sub Junior (Under 15 & Under 17) Championship
- Tamilnadu State Under 10 Championship
- Tamilnadu State Sub Junior Open Badminton Tournament
- Tamilnadu State Under 10 Ranking Tournament
- Tamilnadu State Sub Junior Under 17 Ranking Badminton Tournament
- Tamilnadu State Veterans Championships
- Tamilnadu State Senior Championship
- Yonex-Sunrise All India Senior Ranking Badminton Tournament-2015 at Chennai, Tamil Nadu - Anna University Championship
- Yonex-Sunrise All India Masters Ranking Badminton Tournament 2019 at Ooty, Tamil Nadu
- Tamilnadu State Masters Badminton Championship

== Affiliated Associations ==
As of 2023, TNBA has a total of 30 affiliated districts associations.

- Chennai District Badminton Association
- Coimbatore District Badminton Association
- Cuddalore District Badminton Association
- Dindigul District Badminton Association
- Dharmapuri District Badminton Association
- Erode District Badminton Association
- Kancheepuram District Badminton Association
- Kanyakumari District Badminton Association
- Karur District Badminton Association
- Krishnagiri District Badminton Association
- Madurai District Badminton Association
- Nagapattinam District Badminton Association
- Namakkal District Badminton Association
- Nilgiris District Badminton Association
- Pudukkottai District Badminton Association
- Perambalur District Badminton Association
- Ramanathapuram District Badminton Association
- Salem District Badminton Association
- Tiruvannamalai District Badminton Association
- Thanjavur District Badminton Association
- Theni District Badminton Association
- Thiruvallur District Badminton Association
- Tirupur District Badminton Association
- Thiruvarur District Badminton Association
- Tirunelveli District Badminton Association
- Thoothukudi District Badminton Association
- Tiruchirappalli District Badminton Association
- Vellore District Badminton Association
- Villupuram District Badminton Association
- Virudhunagar District Badminton Association

== See also ==
- Badminton in India
- India national badminton team
- Badminton Association of India
- Junior Badminton League
