= 1971 Asian Badminton Championships – Men's team =

Badminton championship in Jakarta, Indonesia

Men's team at the 1971 Asian Badminton Championships
- Venue: Istora Senayan
- Location: Jakarta, Indonesia
- Dates: 13 – 16 August 1971

The men's team tournament at the 1971 Asian Badminton Championships, also known as the Tunku Abdul Rahman Cup (Malay: Piala Tunku Abdul Rahman) took place from 13 to 16 August 1971 at the Istora Senayan in Jakarta, Indonesia. A total of 14 teams competed in this event. Taiwan and the Khmer Republic withdrew from the event.

== Results ==
=== Bracket ===
Round of 16
South Korea	4
Philippines	1
Japan	5
Hong Kong	0
India	2
Singapore	3
Laos	0
Thailand	5
Pakistan	3
Ceylon	2
Nepal	1
Burma	4

Quarter-finals
Indonesia	5
South Korea	0
Japan	5
Singapore	0
Thailand	5
Pakistan	0
Burma	0
Malaysia	5

Semi-finals
Indonesia	5
Japan	0
Thailand	0
Malaysia	5

Final
Indonesia	5
Malaysia	0
Third place
Japan	3
Thailand	2

=== Round of 16 ===
Philippines
1
Istora Senayan
13 August 1971

South Korea
4

			1	2	3
1	(Philippines) (South Korea)	James Lim; Kim Bong-sub	7; 15	4; 15
2	(Philippines) (South Korea)	Daniel So; Kim Eui-gon	10; 15	4; 15
3	(Philippines) (South Korea)	Renato Navarro / Armando Yanga; Han Sung-ki / Kim Eui-gon	15; 6	10; 15	15; 8
4	(Philippines) (South Korea)	Daniel So; Kim Bong-sub	7; 15	1; 15
5	(Philippines) (South Korea)	James Lim; Kim Eui-gon	7; 15	6; 15

Japan
5
Istora Senayan
13 August 1971

Hong Kong
0

			1	2	3
1	(Japan) (Hong Kong)	Junji Honma; Tsoi Fai	15; 4	15; 6
2	(Japan) (Hong Kong)	Ippei Kojima; Ko Ying	15; 5	15; 7
3	(Japan) (Hong Kong)	Junji Honma / Shoichi Toganoo; Tsoi Fai / Wong Cheong Leong	15; 7	15; 2
4	(Japan) (Hong Kong)	Junji Honma; Ko Ying	15; 9	15; 1
5	(Japan) (Hong Kong)	Ippei Kojima; Tsoi Fai	15; 5	15; 5

India
2
Istora Senayan
13 August 1971

Singapore
3

			1	2	3
1	(India) (Singapore)	Suresh Goel; Wee Kin	12; 15	16; 18
2	(India) (Singapore)	Dipu Ghosh; Yeo Ah Seng	11; 15	15; 4	9; 15
3	(India) (Singapore)	Dipu Ghosh / Raman Ghosh; Sudirman Noordin / Tan Joo Chye	15; 0	15; 7
4	(India) (Singapore)	Suresh Goel; Yeo Ah Seng	15; 6	15; 2
5	(India) (Singapore)	Dipu Ghosh; Wee Kin				w/o

Thailand
5
Istora Senayan
13 August 1971

Laos
0

			1	2	3
1	(Thailand) (Laos)	Bandid Jaiyen; Champadeng Outhabong	15; 8	15; 4
2	(Thailand) (Laos)	Soonchai Akyapisut; Boun Minh	15; 2	15; 3
3	(Thailand) (Laos)	Chirasak Champakao / Chavalert Chumkum; Boun Minh / Vieng Kham	15; 3	15; 1
4	(Thailand) (Laos)	Soonchai Akyapisut; Champadeng Outhabong	15; 1	15; 5
5	(Thailand) (Laos)	Bandid Jaiyen; Boun Minh	15; 4	15; 5

Pakistan
3
Istora Senayan
13 August 1971

Ceylon
2

			1	2	3
1	(Pakistan) (Dominion of Ceylon)	Khawaja Salahuddin; L. R. Ariyananda	12; 15	11; 15
2	(Pakistan) (Dominion of Ceylon)	Hassan Shaheed; K. D. Nallatamby	15; 5	15; 7
3	(Pakistan) (Dominion of Ceylon)	Javed Iqbal / Hassan Shaheed; L. R. Ariyananda / A.R.T. de Silva	15; 4	15; 9
4	(Pakistan) (Dominion of Ceylon)	Khawaja Salahuddin; K. D. Nallatamby	15; 2	15; 8
5	(Pakistan) (Dominion of Ceylon)	Hassan Shaheed; L. R. Ariyananda	5; 15	15; 7	3; 15

Burma
4
Istora Senayan
13 August 1971

Nepal
1

			1	2	3
1	(Myanmar) (Nepal)	San Myint; Kishor Bahadur Singha	15; 3	15; 4
2	(Myanmar) (Nepal)	Kyaw Sein Shaung; Mohan B. Sahi	15; 5	15; 7
3	(Myanmar) (Nepal)	San Myint / Thet Naing; Prem Pandey / Shankar Singha	15; 3	15; 9
4	(Myanmar) (Nepal)	Kyaw Sein Shaung; Kishor Bahadur Singha	15; 5	6; 15	10; 15
5	(Myanmar) (Nepal)	San Myint; Mohan B. Sahi	15; 1	15; 2

=== Quarter-finals ===
Indonesia
5
Istora Senayan
14 August 1971

South Korea
0

			1	2	3
1	(Indonesia) (South Korea)	Muljadi; Kim Bong-sub	15; 1	15; 0
2	(Indonesia) (South Korea)	Rudy Hartono; Han Sung-ki	15; 2	15; 0
3	(Indonesia) (South Korea)	Ade Chandra / Christian Hadinata; Kim Bong-sub / Lee Ok-hyun	15; 3	15; 1
4	(Indonesia) (South Korea)	Rudy Hartono; Kim Bong-sub	15; 2	15; 3
5	(Indonesia) (South Korea)	Muljadi; Han Sung-ki	15; 1	15; 0

Japan
5
Istora Senayan
14 August 1971

Singapore
0

			1	2	3
1	(Japan) (Singapore)	Junji Honma; Yeo Ah Seng	15; 9	9; 15	15; 10
2	(Japan) (Singapore)	Ippei Kojima; Wee Kin	15; 4	15; 6
3	(Japan) (Singapore)	Junji Honma / Shoichi Toganoo; Sudirman Noordin / Tan Joo Chye	15; 3	15; 9
4	(Japan) (Singapore)	Ippei Kojima; Yeo Ah Seng				w/o
5	(Japan) (Singapore)	Junji Honma; Wee Kin				w/o

Thailand
5
Istora Senayan
14 August 1971

Pakistan
0

			1	2	3
1	(Thailand) (Pakistan)	Bandid Jaiyen; Khawaja Salahuddin	15; 0	15; 0
2	(Thailand) (Pakistan)	Soonchai Akyapisut; Hassan Shaheed	15; 10	15; 12
3	(Thailand) (Pakistan)	Chirasak Champakao / Chavalert Chumkum; Javed Iqbal / Hassan Shaheed	15; 4	15; 12
4	(Thailand) (Pakistan)	Soonchai Akyapisut; Khawaja Salahuddin				w/o
5	(Thailand) (Pakistan)	Bandid Jaiyen; Hassan Shaheed				w/o

Malaysia
5
Istora Senayan
14 August 1971

Burma
0

			1	2	3
1	(Malaysia) (Myanmar)	Tan Aik Mong; San Myint	15; 2	15; 9
2	(Malaysia) (Myanmar)	Tan Aik Huang; Kyaw Sein Shaung	15; 3	15; 5
3	(Malaysia) (Myanmar)	Abdul Rahman Mohamed / Ng Tat Wai; San Myint / Thet Naing	15; 8	15; 3
4	(Malaysia) (Myanmar)	Tan Aik Mong; Kyaw Sein Shaung	15; 1	15; 0
5	(Malaysia) (Myanmar)	Tan Aik Huang; San Myint				w/o

=== Semi-finals ===
Indonesia
5
Istora Senayan
15 August 1971

Japan
0

			1	2	3
1	(Indonesia) (Japan)	Rudy Hartono; Junji Honma	15; 12	15; 3
2	(Indonesia) (Japan)	Muljadi; Ippei Kojima	15; 10	15; 10
3	(Indonesia) (Japan)	Ade Chandra / Christian Hadinata; Junji Honma / Shoichi Toganoo	15; 3	15; 13
4	(Indonesia) (Japan)	Rudy Hartono; Ippei Kojima				w/o
5	(Indonesia) (Japan)	Muljadi; Junji Honma				w/o

Malaysia
5
Istora Senayan
15 August 1971

Thailand
0

			1	2	3
1	(Malaysia) (Thailand)	Tan Aik Huang; Bandid Jaiyen	15; 4	15; 4
2	(Malaysia) (Thailand)	Tan Aik Mong; Soonchai Akyapisut	15; 13	15; 1
3	(Malaysia) (Thailand)	Abdul Rahman Mohamed / Ng Tat Wai; Chavalert Chumkum / Thongchai Phongful	17; 14	15; 1
4	(Malaysia) (Thailand)	Tan Aik Huang; Soonchai Akyapisut				w/o
5	(Malaysia) (Thailand)	Tan Aik Mong; Bandid Jaiyen				w/o

=== Third place ===
Japan
3
Istora Senayan
16 August 1971

Thailand
2

			1	2	3
1	(Japan) (Thailand)	Junji Honma; Bandid Jaiyen	12; 15	9; 15
2	(Japan) (Thailand)	Ippei Kojima; Soonchai Akyapisut	15; 10	15; 8
3	(Japan) (Thailand)	Junji Honma / Shoichi Toganoo; Chavalert Chumkum / Thongchai Phongful	15; 6	15; 7
4	(Japan) (Thailand)	Junji Honma; Soonchai Akyapisut	15; 3	15; 5
5	(Japan) (Thailand)	Ippei Kojima; Bandid Jaiyen	1; 15	5; 15

=== Final ===
Indonesia
3
Istora Senayan
16 August 1971

Malaysia
2

			1	2	3
1	(Indonesia) (Malaysia)	Rudy Hartono; Tan Aik Huang	15; 5	15; 3
2	(Indonesia) (Malaysia)	Muljadi; Tan Aik Mong	15; 11	14; 18	10; 15
3	(Indonesia) (Malaysia)	Ade Chandra / Christian Hadinata; Abdul Rahman Mohamed / Ng Tat Wai	15; 5	15; 7
4	(Indonesia) (Malaysia)	Rudy Hartono; Tan Aik Mong	15; 4	15; 3
5	(Indonesia) (Malaysia)	Muljadi; Tan Aik Huang				w/o
