= 1960 Uber Cup squads =

This article lists the squads for the 1960 Uber Cup participating teams. The age listed for each player is on 4 April 1960 which was the first day of the tournament.

== Teams ==
=== Canada ===
Six players represented Denmark in the 1960 Uber Cup.

Name	DoB/Age
Marjory Shedd	17 March 1926 (aged 34)
Joy Campbell	1935 (aged 24–25)
Jean Miller	1935 (aged 24–25)
Dorothy Tinline	25 December 1921 (aged 38)
Joan Hennessy	6 June 1920 (aged 39)
Kae Grant	1931 (aged 28–29)

=== Denmark ===
Six players represented Denmark in the 1960 Uber Cup.

Name	DoB/Age
Tonny Holst-Christensen	1935 (aged 24–25)
Hanne Jensen	1935 (aged 24–25)
Inge Hasselsteen	1931 (aged 28–29)
Birte Kristiansen	1933 (aged 23–24)
Aase Winther	1939 (aged 20–21)
Kirsten Thorndahl	9 April 1928 (aged 31)

=== India ===
Five players represented India in the 1960 Uber Cup.

Name	DoB/Age
Meena Shah	31 January 1937 (aged 23)
Mumtaj Lotwalla	1922 (aged 37–38)
Sarojini Apte	1942 (aged 17–18)
Sushila Kapadia	27 September 1932 (aged 27)
Prem Prashar	1931 (aged 28–29)
Suman Athavale	1930 (aged 29–30)

=== New Zealand ===
Six players represented Denmark in the 1960 Uber Cup.

Name	DoB/Age
Sonia Cox	25 December 1936 (aged 23)
Heather Robson	6 May 1928 (aged 31)
Glenys Hopkinson	26 February 1938 (aged 22)
Elizabeth M. Meyer	1929 (aged 30–31)
Val Gow	8 March 1929 (aged 31)
Nancy Fleming	1911 (aged 48–49)

=== United States ===
Six players represented the United States in the 1960 Uber Cup.

Name	DoB/Age
Judy Devlin	22 October 1935 (aged 24)
Margaret Varner	4 October 1927 (aged 32)
Dorothy O'Neil	5 September 1930 (aged 32)
Lois Alston	1931 (aged 28–29)
Beulah Armendariz	1929 (aged 30–31)
Susan Devlin	1931 (aged 25–26)
