= Sunder Deodhar =

Indian badminton player

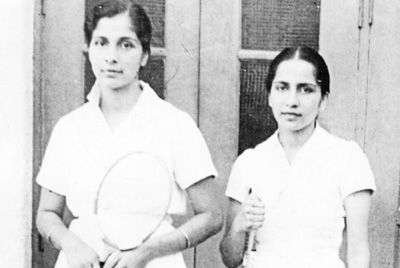
Tara and Sunder Deodhar

Sunder Deodhar (later Sunder Patwardhan) was an Indian badminton player. She was the daughter of Indian cricket player D. B. Deodhar.

== Life and career ==
Sunder Deodhar won her first national title in 1942 in the women's doubles with her sister Tara Deodhar. Between 1942 and 1954 the Deodhar sisters, Suman, Sunder, and Tara, dominated the Indian National Badminton Championships, including winning both the women's singles and doubles in 1942 and 1943. She also had a twin, Sham.

Sunder Deodhar is deceased.
