= 1999 French Open (badminton) =

Badminton championships

The 1999 French Open in badminton was an A-level tournament in the European Circuit held in Paris, from 17 to 21 March 1999. The prize money was US$10,000.

== Venue ==
- Halle Carpentier, Paris, France

== Final results ==
| Category | Winners | Runners-up | Score |
|---|---|---|---|
| Men's singles | (China) Chen Gang | (India) Pullela Gopichand | 15–8, 10–15, 15–10 |
| Women's singles | (China) Zhou Mi | (India) Aparna Popat | 11–0, 11–2 |
| Men's doubles | (England) Anthony Clark & Ian Sullivan | (Poland) Robert Mateusiak & Michal Logosz | 15–11, 15–10 |
| Women's doubles | (China) Qin Yiyuan & Gao Ling | (Malaysia) Ang Li Peng & Chor Hooi Yee | 15–0, 15–3 |
| Mixed doubles | (China) Chen Gang & Qin Yiyuan | (England) Ian Sullivan & Gail Emms | 15–12, 15–12 |

| Preceded by 1998 French Open | French Open | Succeeded by 2000 French Open |
