= 1965 Asian Badminton Championships =

Badminton championships

Tournament details
- Dates: 30 October – 14 November
- Edition: 2
- Location: Lucknow, Uttar Pradesh, India

The 1965 Asia Badminton Championships was the 2nd tournament of the Badminton Asia Championships. It was held in Lucknow, India.

== Medal summary ==
=== Medalists ===
Discipline	Gold	Silver	Bronze
Men's singles	(India) Dinesh Khanna	(Thailand) Sangob Rattanusorn	(Malaysia) Tan Yee Khan
Men's singles	(India) Dinesh Khanna	(Thailand) Sangob Rattanusorn	(India) Suresh Goel
Women's singles	(England) Angela Bairstow	(England) Ursula Smith	(India) Meena Shah
Women's singles	(England) Angela Bairstow	(England) Ursula Smith	(India) Sarojini Apte
Men's doubles	(Thailand) Narong Bhornchima (Thailand) Chavalert Chumkum	(Malaysia) Tan Yee Khan (Thailand) Temshakdi Mahakonok	(Hong Kong) Wong Fai Hung (Hong Kong) Koo Man For
Men's doubles	(Thailand) Narong Bhornchima (Thailand) Chavalert Chumkum	(Malaysia) Tan Yee Khan (Thailand) Temshakdi Mahakonok	(Thailand) Sangob Rattanusorn (Thailand) Sila Ulao
Women's doubles	(England) Angela Bairstow (England) Ursula Smith	(Malaysia) Rosalind Singha Ang (Malaysia) Teoh Siew Yong	(Sri Lanka) Lucky Dharmasena (Sri Lanka) Nilanthi Kannangara
Women's doubles	(England) Angela Bairstow (England) Ursula Smith	(Malaysia) Rosalind Singha Ang (Malaysia) Teoh Siew Yong	(Thailand) Sumol Chanklum (Thailand) Boopha Kaenthong
Mixed doubles	(Malaysia) Tan Yee Khan (England) Angela Bairstow	(Thailand) Chavalert Chumkum (England) Ursula Smith	(India) A. I. Sheikh (India) Achala Karnik
Mixed doubles	(Malaysia) Tan Yee Khan (England) Angela Bairstow	(Thailand) Chavalert Chumkum (England) Ursula Smith	(India) Owen Roncon (India) Sarojini Apte
Men's team	Malaysia; Omar Manap; Tan Yee Khan; Teh Kew San; Yew Cheng Hoe	Thailand; Sangob Rattanusorn; Narong Bhornchima; Somsook Boonyasukhanonda; Raphi Kanchanaraphi	India; Dipu Ghosh; Suresh Goel; Nandu Natekar; Dinesh Khanna; Raman Ghosh
Men's team	Malaysia; Omar Manap; Tan Yee Khan; Teh Kew San; Yew Cheng Hoe	Thailand; Sangob Rattanusorn; Narong Bhornchima; Somsook Boonyasukhanonda; Raphi Kanchanaraphi	Japan; Takeshi Anzawa; Koichi Ohtake; Yoshinori Itagaki

=== Medal table ===
* Host nation (India)

Rank	Nation	Gold	Silver	Bronze	Total
1	England	2.5	1.5	0	4
2	Malaysia	1.5	1.5	1	4
3	Thailand	1	3	2	6
4	India*	1	0	6	7
5	Hong Kong	0	0	1	1
5	Japan	0	0	1	1
5	Sri Lanka	0	0	1	1
Totals (7 entries)		6	6	12	24

== Men's singles ==
=== Finals ===
Semi-finals
(India) Suresh Goel	9	8
(India) Dinesh Khanna	15	15
(Malaysia) Tan Yee Khan	15	13	1
(Thailand) Sangob Rattanusorn	12	15	15

Final
(India) Dinesh Khanna	15	15
(Thailand) Sangob Rattanusorn	3	11

=== Top half ===
==== Section 1 ====
First round
(Malaysia) Yew C H	w	/	o
(Nepal) S B Basnyat
(Dominion of Ceylon) L R Ariyananda	9	5
(Hong Kong) Yeung L M	15	15
(India) S Goel	15	15
(Thailand) P Sakuntaniyom	6	3
(Japan) K Ōtake	15	10	15
(Philippines) D So	11	15	12

Second round
(Malaysia) Yew C H	15	15
(Hong Kong) Yeung L M	9	5
(India) S Goel	15	15
(Japan) K Ōtake	0	10

Quarter-finals
(Malaysia) Yew C H	12	15	13
(India) S Goel	15	8	15

==== Section 2 ====
First round
(Japan) Y Itagaki	15	15
(Nepal) D Pandey	1	3
(Thailand) N Bhornchima	15	15
(Malaysia) Omar M	2	8
(Hong Kong) Wong C L	15	15
(Philippines) A Yanga	2	3
(Dominion of Ceylon) G Chandrasena	1	2
(India) D Khanna	15	15

Second round
(Japan) Y Itagaki	18	15
(Thailand) N Bhornchima	15	5
(Hong Kong) Wong C L	18	2	2
(India) D Khanna	16	15	15

Quarter-finals
(Japan) Y Itagaki	1	12
(India) D Khanna	15	15

=== Bottom half ===
==== Section 3 ====
First round
(Nepal) G B Khadka	2	0
(Hong Kong) Koo M F	15	15
(Japan) T Anzawa	1	5
(Malaysia) Tan Y K	15	15
(Dominion of Ceylon) R de Silva	15	12	6
(Thailand) S Ulao	7	15	15
(Philippines) R Gutierrez	2	3
(India) N Natekar	15	15

Second round
(Hong Kong) Koo M F	6	9
(Malaysia) Tan Y K	15	15
(Thailand) S Ulao	3	11
(India) N Natekar	15	15

Quarter-finals
(Malaysia) Tan Y K	15	2	15
(India) N Natekar	13	15	11

==== Section 4 ====
First round
(Singapore) Lee K T	15	15
(Hong Kong) Wong F H	12	6
(Nepal) S Shamsher	w	/	o
(Malaysia) Ng B B
(Dominion of Ceylon) S Chandrasena	10	1
(India) R Ghosh	15	15
(Philippines) C Co	4	0
(Thailand) S Rattanusorn	15	15

Second round
(Singapore) Lee K T	15	15
(Nepal) S Shamsher	2	1
(India) R Ghosh	15	5	10
(Thailand) S Rattanusorn	9	15	15

Quarter-finals
(Singapore) Lee K T	10	6
(Thailand) S Rattanusorn	15	15

== Women's singles ==
=== Finals ===
First round
(Dominion of Ceylon) Lucky Dharmasena
(India) Sarojini Apte	w	/	o
(Malaysia) Teoh Siew Yong	11	11
(India) Shobha Moorthy	5	5
(England) Angela Bairstow	11	11
(Thailand) Boopha Kaenthong	3	1
(Malaysia) Rosalind Singha Ang	11	11
(Dominion of Ceylon) Nilanthi Kannangara	3	0
(India) Meena Shah	11	11
(Thailand) Sumol Chanklum	2	2

Quarter-finals
(United States) Judy Hashman
(India) Sarojini Apte	w	/	o
(Malaysia) Teoh Siew Yong	0	8
(England) Angela Bairstow	11	11
(Malaysia) Rosalind Singha Ang	8	3
(India) Meena Shah	11	11
(India) Damayanti Subedar	6	0
(England) Ursula Smith	11	11

Semi-finals
(India) Sarojini Apte	5	0
(England) Angela Bairstow	11	11
(India) Meena Shah	4	6
(England) Ursula Smith	11	11

Final
(England) Angela Bairstow	11	11
(England) Ursula Smith	6	4

== Men's doubles ==
=== Finals ===
Semi-finals
(Thailand) Temshakdi Mahakonok (Malaysia) Tan Yee Khan	15	15	15
(Thailand) Sangob Rattanusorn (Thailand) Sila Ulao	12	18	8
(Hong Kong) Koo Man For (Hong Kong) Wong Fai Hung	13	16
(Thailand) Narong Bhornchima (Thailand) Chavalert Chumkum	15	17

Final
(Thailand) Temshakdi Mahakonok (Malaysia) Tan Yee Khan	8	10
(Thailand) Narong Bhornchima (Thailand) Chavalert Chumkum	15	15

=== Top half ===
==== Section 1 ====
First round

Second round
(Thailand) T Mahakonok (Malaysia) Tan Y K	w	/	o
(Nepal) D Pandey (Nepal) D Rana
(Thailand) S Boonyasukhanonda (Thailand) R Kanchanaraphi
(India) S Bhatia (India) O Roncon	w	/	o

Quarter-finals
(Thailand) T Mahakonok (Malaysia) Tan Y K	7	15	15
(India) S Bhatia (India) O Roncon	15	13	10

==== Section 2 ====
First round
(Hong Kong) Wong C L (Hong Kong) Yeung L M	15	15
(Dominion of Ceylon) L R Ariyananda (Dominion of Ceylon) K Vijendra	3	6
(Philippines) D So (Philippines) A Yanga	9	7
(Thailand) S Rattanusorn (Thailand) S Ulao	15	15
(Nepal) S B Basnyat (Nepal) G B Khadka	10	11
(India) C Deoras (India) S Goel	15	15

Second round
(Japan) T Anzawa (Japan) K Ōtake	15	15
(Hong Kong) Wong C L (Hong Kong) Yeung L M	5	8
(Thailand) S Rattanusorn (Thailand) S Ulao	9
(India) C Deoras (India) S Goel	11^{r}

Quarter-finals
(Japan) T Anzawa (Japan) K Ōtake	15	13	9
(Thailand) S Rattanusorn (Thailand) S Ulao	8	15	15

=== Bottom half ===
==== Section 3 ====
First round
(Malaysia) Omar M (Malaysia) Yew C H	15	15
(Dominion of Ceylon) S Chandrasena (Dominion of Ceylon) R de Silva	12	6
(Hong Kong) Koo M F (Hong Kong) Wong F H	15	15
(Nepal) B Rana (Nepal) H Rana	4	0
(Philippines) C Co (Philippines) O Yanga	17	15
(Hong Kong) Chu S W (India) D Khanna	14	9

Second round
(Malaysia) Omar M (Malaysia) Yew C H	12	12
(Hong Kong) Koo M F (Hong Kong) Wong F H	15	15
(Philippines) C Co (Philippines) O Yanga
(India) R Ghosh (India) N Natekar	w	/	o

Quarter-finals
(Hong Kong) Koo M F (Hong Kong) Wong F H	9	15	15
(India) R Ghosh (India) N Natekar	15	9	7

==== Section 4 ====
First round

Second round
(Japan) Y Itagaki (Singapore) Lee K T
(India) D Ghosh (India) A I Shaikh	w	/	o
(Dominion of Ceylon) G Chandrasena (Dominion of Ceylon) A R L Wijesekera	9	4
(Thailand) N Bhornchima (Thailand) C Chumkum	15	15

Quarter-finals
(India) D Ghosh (India) A I Shaikh	15	3	3
(Thailand) N Bhornchima (Thailand) C Chumkum	12	15	15

== Women's doubles ==
=== Finals ===
Quarter-finals
(United States) Judy Hashman (India) Shobha Moorthy
(Dominion of Ceylon) Lucky Dharmasena (Dominion of Ceylon) Nilanthi Kannangara	w	/	o
(Malaysia) Rosalind Singha Ang (Malaysia) Teoh Siew Yong	15	15
(India) Achala Karnik (India) Meena Shah	5	8
(Thailand) Sumol Chanklum (Thailand) Boopha Kaenthong	15	15
(India) Sarojini Apte (India) Sunila Apte	2	6
(England) Angela Bairstow (England) Ursula Smith	15	15
(India) Nirupama Pradhan (India) Damayanti Subedar	10	3

Semi-finals
(Dominion of Ceylon) Lucky Dharmasena (Dominion of Ceylon) Nilanthi Kannangara	2	1
(Malaysia) Rosalind Singha Ang (Malaysia) Teoh Siew Yong	15	15
(Thailand) Sumol Chanklum (Thailand) Boopha Kaenthong	4	10
(England) Angela Bairstow (England) Ursula Smith	15	15

Final
(Malaysia) Rosalind Singha Ang (Malaysia) Teoh Siew Yong	13	11
(England) Angela Bairstow (England) Ursula Smith	18	15

== Mixed doubles ==
=== Finals ===
Quarter-finals
(India) A. I. Shaikh (India) Achala Karnik	15	15
(Hong Kong) Wong Cheong Leong (India) Shobha Moorthy	6	13
(Thailand) Chavalert Chumkum (England) Ursula Smith	4	15	15
(India) Raman Ghosh (India) Damayanti Subedar	15	10	5

Semi-finals
(Malaysia) Tan Yee Khan (England) Angela Bairstow	15	15
(India) A. I. Shaikh (India) Achala Karnik	10	11
(Thailand) Chavalert Chumkum (England) Ursula Smith	15	15
(India) Owen Roncon (India) Sarojini Apte	2	9

Final
(Malaysia) Tan Yee Khan (England) Angela Bairstow	6	15	15
(Thailand) Chavalert Chumkum (England) Ursula Smith	15	3	2
