= Tara Deodhar =

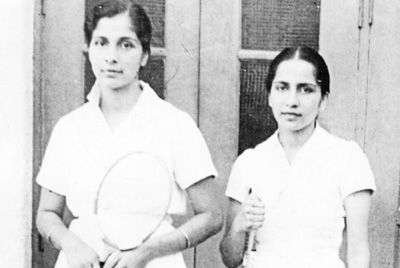
- Tara and Sunder Deodhar

Personal information
- Born: 1924 Pune, Maharashtra, India

Sport
- Country: India
- Sport: Badminton

Tara Deodhar (born 1924, date of death unknown) was an Indian badminton and tennis player. She was the daughter of cricketer D. B. Deodhar.

== Life and career ==
Deodhar won her first national title in 1942 in the women's doubles with her sister Sunder Deodhar. Between 1942 and 1954 the Deodhar sisters, Suman, Sunder, and Tara dominated the Indian National Badminton Champion competition. Besides becoming the singles national champion for three consecutive years (1942–1944), Tara was the women's doubles champion in 1942 and 1943 with her sister Sunder.

While studying at University of Wisconsin-Madison in the United States, she was seeded fifth among foreign tennis players in the U.S. Tennis Championship.

Tara Deodhar is deceased.
