= Pearl Goss =

Indian badminton player

Pearl Goss was an Indian badminton player.

She was the national women's singles badminton champion of India in 1936, 1937, 1938, 1940, and 1949.

In 2011 she was given a lifetime achievement award by the organisation "Badminton 45" at an event celebrating the history of badminton in India. A sum of 50,000 rupees was presented to her or, according to another source, to her close family.
