= Junior Badminton League =

India's First Junior Badminton League

- Sport: Badminton
- First season: 2022
- Administrator: EVI Sports Private Limited
- No. of teams: 10
- Country: India
- Venues: Chennai, Trichy
- Most recent champion: Madurai Indians
- Broadcasters: Eurosport; Jio cinemas
- Tournament format: Round-robin and knock-out
- Website: jbl-india.com

The Junior Badminton League (JBL) was India's First Junior Badminton League that is annually held in Tamil Nadu, India under the auspices of Tamil Nadu Badminton Association (TNBA) affiliated to Badminton Association of India (BAI). The league has Ten franchises across the state. The League is usually held in summer between May and August every year. Its 2023 league was the streamed live event on Eurosport & Jio Cinemas . The current champions are Madurai Indians, who won the season 2023 after defeating Trichy Tamil Veeras in the final at the JMC Indoor Stadium in Trichy.

== Foundation ==
The first season of Junior Badminton League started in July 2022 at Chennai. In 2022, There were totally 464 International and National ranked Tamil Nadu players available for the auction out of which 88 players were selected by franchises and Auction happened in Le Méridien, Coimbatore.

In 2023, There were totally 516 International and National ranked Tamil Nadu players available for the auction out of which 88 players were selected by franchises and Auction happened in Crowne Plaza, Dubai.

== Teams ==
As of the 2024 season, the league has ten teams based in Districts across Tamil Nadu. All 10 JBL teams in the districts they are based in

Team	Districts	Debut
Chennai City Gangsters	Chennai	2022
Kovai Super Kings	Coimbatore	2022
Thanjai Thalaivas	Thanjavur	2022
Madurai Indians	Madurai	2023
Rainbow Rockers	Erode	2023
Tiruppur Warriors	Tiruppur	2024
Team Tirunelveli	Tirunelveli	2024
Team Tuticorin	Tuticorin	2024
Team Kanchi	Kanchipuram	2024

== Tournament seasons and results ==
The current champions are Madurai Indians, who defeated Trichy Tamil Veeras by three ties in the 2023 JBL final to secure their second title.

Season	Winner	Winning margin	Runner-up	Final venue
2022	Chettinadu Champs	3-2	Tiruppur Warriors	Jawaharlal Nehru Indoor Stadium, Chennai
2023	Madurai Indians	3-2	Trichy Tamil Veeras	JMC Indoor Stadium, Trichy

== Broadcasting ==
Eurosport and Jio Cinema as our official broadcasting partner for 2024.
Season	Year	Live Broadcast in	Viewership
JBL Season 2	2023	Eurosport	12 million across Global
JBL Season 2	2023	Jio Cinemas	12 million across Global
JBL Season 3	2024	Eurosport	
JBL Season 3	2024	Jio Cinemas	
