= D. B. Deodhar =

Former Indian cricketer (born 1892)

Dinkar Balwant Deodhar
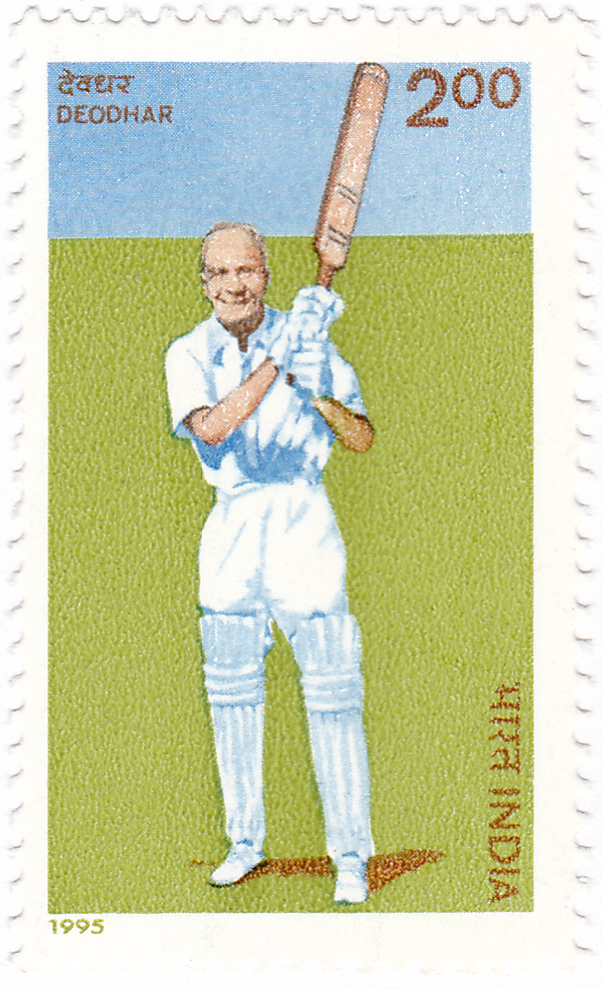
- Deodhar on a 1996 stamp of India

Personal information
- Born: 14 January 1892; Poona, Bombay presidency, British India
- Died: 24 August 1993 (aged 101); Pune, Maharashtra, India
- Batting: Right-handed
- Bowling: Legbreak

Career statistics
Competition	First-class
Matches	81
Runs scored	4,522
Batting average	39.32
100s/50s	9/27
Top score	246
Balls bowled	970
Wickets	11
Bowling average	53.27
5 wickets in innings	0
10 wickets in match	0
Best bowling	2/24
Catches/stumpings	70/–
- Source: CricketArchive, 7 July 2019

Dinkar Balwant Deodhar (14 January 1892 – 24 August 1993) was an Indian cricketer. He played first-class cricket from 1911 to 1948.

== Cricket career ==
Deodhar was born in Poona (now Pune), British India. He was a professor of Sanskrit at Pune College.

Popularly known as the Grand Old Man of Indian Cricket, Deodhar was an aggressive right-hand batsman and a leg-break bowler. He captained Maharashtra in Ranji Trophy matches from 1939 to 1941. In his first-class career, he played 81 matches, scoring 4,522 runs at an average of 39.32 with a highest score of 246.

Deodhar was vice-president of the Board of Control for Cricket in India, the President of the Maharashtra Cricket Association, and also a national team selector.

Like Bill Ashdown, Deodhar is one of the few people known to have played first-class cricket both before the First World War and after the Second World War, having played in the Bombay Triangular in 1911 and the Ranji Trophy in 1946. In a Ranji Trophy game against Nawanagar in 1944, he scored centuries in both innings, helping his team win. He was aged 53 at the time.

He was awarded the Padma Shri award in 1965 and the Padma Bhushan in 1991 by the Indian Government. He was the first Indian first-class cricketer known to have lived to 100. Vasant Raiji became the second in 2020. Raiji died a few months after becoming a centenarian.

== Personal life ==
India's former National Badminton Champions Tara Deodhar, Sunder Deodhar, and Suman Deodhar are his daughters.

== Legacy ==
The Deodhar Trophy, a limited overs inter-zonal cricket tournament played in India since 1973, is named after him. In 1996, India Post issued a commemorative stamp in his honour. A bronze statue of Deodhar was unveiled at Pune's Maharashtra Cricket Association Stadium in 2012.
