= Vijay A. Madgavkar =

Indian badminton player

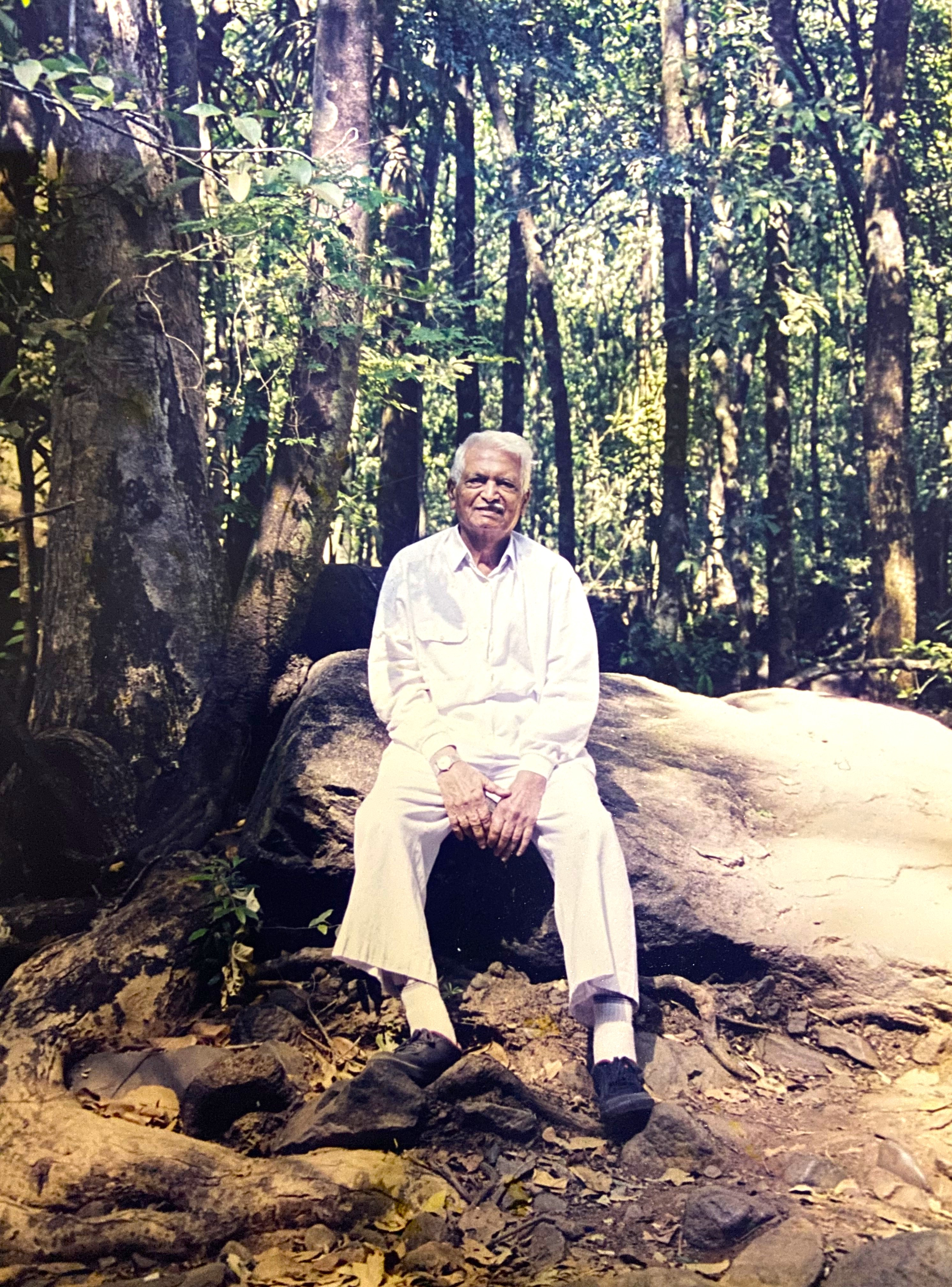
- Madgavkar in Goa, 2001

Personal information
- Country: India
- Born: 8 July 1914
- Died: 13 March 2004 (aged 89); Goa, India

Vijay A. Madgavkar (July 8, 1914 – March 13, 2004) was an Indian badminton player. He was the first player to win men's singles in the first edition of Indian National Badminton Championships in 1934 at the Calcutta Nationals. Vijay Madgavkar claimed the national doubles title playing alongside B. Roy in 1935.

His son, Annand Madgavkar, followed in his father's footsteps, and won several badminton championship, including winning the All India Inter University Championship continually for 1967, 1968 and 1969. When the Government of Goa failed to allow Anil Kudchadkar, the junior national badminton champion and a citizen of Goa, admission for medicine at the GMC because he was short by two marks, both Vijay and Annand returned top state awards to the government in protest. The Goa Government eventually gave it's approval to adopt a formal "Goa Sports Policy" - a decision credited to the movement started by Vijay Madgavkar and his son Annand with the return of their awards.
