= Suman Deodhar =

Indian badminton player (born 1930)

Suman Deodhar (later Suman Athavale, born October 1930) is an Indian former badminton player. She is the daughter of Indian cricket player D. B. Deodhar.

== Life and career ==
Between 1942 and 1954 the Deodhar sisters, Suman, Tara, Sunder Deodhar, dominated the Indian National Badminton Champion competition. Suman won her first national title in 1946 in the women's doubles with her sister Sunder. More titles in the women's doubles followed in 1947, 1951 and 1954. In 1947 she also reached gold in the mixed doubles and in 1951 gold in the women's singles.

As of April 2020, Suman Deodhar and her brother Sharad were the last surviving of the five Deodhar siblings.

== Results ==
Year	Tournament	Event	Rank	Name
1946	India: National Championships	Women's doubles	1	Suman Deodhar / Sunder Deodhar
1947	India: National Championships	Mixed doubles	1	Tage Madsen / Suman Deodhar
1947	India: National Championships	Women's doubles	1	Suman Deodhar / Sunder Deodhar
1951	India: National Championships	Women's singles	1	Suman Deodhar
1951	India: National Championships	Women's doubles	1	Suman Deodhar / Sunder Deodhar
1954	India: National Championships	Women's doubles	1	Suman Deodhar / Sunder Patwardhan

== Sources ==
- http://www.badmintonindia.org/frmArcChampionship.aspx?id=0
- thehindu.com
