= Badminton Association of India =

Sports governing body in India

- Sport: Badminton
- Jurisdiction: India
- Abbreviation: BAI
- Founded: 1934; 92 years ago
- Affiliation: Badminton World Federation
- Regional affiliation: Badminton Asia
- Headquarters: New Delhi
- President: Himanta Biswa Sarma

Official website
- www.badmintonindia.org
- (India)

Badminton Association of India, is the governing body of badminton in India. The association, which was formed in 1934, is registered under the societies act. The body has been hosting annual national-level badminton tournaments in India since 1936.

BAI has 28 state members that conduct badminton tournaments and have a two-times voting power compared to the affiliate members, who do not conduct tournaments and have a single vote in the association. It is headquartered in New Delhi, India.

== Tournaments ==
- India Open, an annual tournament which is currently part of BWF World Tour
- Syed Modi International Badminton Championships, a tournament created in memory of the Commonwealth Games gold medalist Syed Modi.
- India International Challenge
- Hyderabad Open
- Odisha Masters
- Guwahati Masters
- Premier Badminton League
- Indian National Badminton Championships

== Affiliated associations ==
As of 2018, BAI has a total of 33 affiliated associations.

- Andhra Pradesh Badminton Association
- Andaman & Nicobar Island Badminton Association
- Arunachal State Badminton Association
- Assam Badminton Association
- Bihar Badminton Association
- Chandigarh Badminton Association
- Chhattisgarh Badminton Association
- Delhi Capital Badminton Association
- Goa Badminton Association
- Gujarat Badminton Association
- Haryana Badminton Association
- Himachal Pradesh Badminton Association
- Jammu and Kashmir Badminton Association
- Jharkhand Badminton Association
- Karnataka Badminton Association
- Kerala Badminton Association
- Maharashtra Badminton Association
- Madhya Pradesh Badminton Association
- Manipur Badminton Association
- Meghalaya Badminton Association
- Mizoram Badminton Association
- Nagaland Badminton Association
- Orissa State Badminton Association
- Pondicherry Badminton Association
- Punjab Badminton Association
- Rajasthan Badminton Association
- Badminton Association Of Sikkim
- Tamil Nadu Badminton Association
- Telangana Badminton Association
- Tripura Badminton Association
- Uttar Pradesh Badminton Association
- Uttarakhand Badminton Association
- West Bengal Badminton Association

== See also ==
- Badminton in India
- India national badminton team
- Indian National Badminton Championships
