= Surya Charishma Tamiri =

Indian badminton player

Tamiri Surya Charishma (born 2006) is an Indian badminton player from Andhra Pradesh.

Charishma is from Dandamudi village, Vijayawada, Andhra Pradesh. Her father Tamiri Naveen Babu is a goldsmith. Her first coach was K. Bhaskar under whom she learnt her basics. She is studying BBA at Chitkara University.

In December 2025, Charishma won her maiden National women's singles title at the 87th Senior National Badminton Championships at Chennupati Ramakotaiah Indoor Stadium in Vijayawada, Andhra Pradesh. She defeated Tanvi Patri of Odisha 17–21, 21–12, 21–14 in the women's finals.
