= Sunila Apte =

Indian badminton player

- Known for: Badminton

Sunila Apte is a female badminton player from India.

== Career ==
Apte has won three doubles titles at Indian National Badminton Championship, with her sister Sarojini Gogte.
