= Sarojini Gogte =

Indian badminton player

Personal information
- Birth name: Sarojini Apte
- Country: India
- Born: 1942
Medal record
Women's badminton
Representing India
Asian Championships
Bronze medal – third place	1965 Lucknow	Women's singles
Bronze medal – third place	1965 Lucknow	Mixed doubles

Sarojini Gogte née Apte (born 1942) is an Indian former badminton player.

== Career ==
Gogte has won two individual and three doubles titles at Indian National Badminton Championship, with her sister Sunila Apte.
