= Kanwal Thakar Singh =

Indian badminton player

Personal information
- Born: 2 November 1954 (age 71) Chandigarh, India

Sport
- Country: India
- Sport: Badminton
- Handedness: Right
- Event: Women's singles, Women's doubles, Mixed doubles
Medal record
Women's badminton
Representing India
Commonwealth Games
Bronze medal – third place	1978 Edmonton	Women's doubles
Asian Games
Bronze medal – third place	1982 New Delhi	Women's Team
Bronze medal – third place	1982 New Delhi	Mixed doubles

Kanwal Thakar Singh (born Kanwal Thakar Kaur; born 2 November 1954) is a former Indian badminton player and an Arjuna Award recipient. She presently lives in the United States of America.

== Early life ==
Singh was born on 2 November 1954 in Chandigarh, India into a Jat Sikh family to an Army officer Colonel Thakur Singh Sandhu and theatre actress Diljit Kaur. Singh's sister Kirron Kher is a Bollywood actress and a member of the Bharatiya Janata Party.

== Education ==
Singh was bright in her studies and finished her postgraduate degree in history from the Post Graduate Government College for Girls, Chandigarh. She was a topper in her class.

== Badminton ==
Singh started playing badminton at the age of 11. She won the women's singles title at the Punjab State Championship at the age of 15 and made her foray into the national games.

In 1974, she was a runner up to Ami Ghia in the National Championship at Ludhiana.

She won a silver medal in the team event at the Jinnah Centenary Championship in Karachi in 1976.

Singh won her first singles title at Panjim in 1977. Then she again won the Women's Singles title at the National Championships. In 1978, she was able to defend her title and was also successful in women's doubles, playing against Ami Ghia. It was the same year that she became a member of the Indian team that participated in the Uber Cup competition against Malaysia in Kuala Lumpur.

At the 1978 Commonwealth Games in Edmonton, she won bronze in doubles with Ami Ghia.

Ami Ghia and Singh reached the quarterfinals at the All England Championship in 1979 where they lost to the top seeded Indonesian pair of Verawati Vaharo and Imelda Wigeono.

In 1981, Singh won gold in the doubles and then a bronze in the 1982 New Delhi Asian Games, both in the team and mixed doubles events.

In July 2002, she became the Chief Patron of the Chandigarh Badminton Players Welfare Association.

== Awards ==
In 1977–78, Singh was the recipient of the Arjuna Award. She also won the Maharaja Ranjit Singh Award.
