= Dipu Ghosh =

Indian badminton player

Personal information
- Born: 17 June 1940 (age 86) Munger, Bihar, British India

Sport
- Country: India
- Sport: Badminton
- Retired: in 1973
Medal record
Men's badminton
Representing India
Asian Championships
Bronze medal – third place	1965 Lucknow	Men's team

Dipu Ghosh (born 17 June 1940) is a former badminton player from India who shined in the 1960s. His brother Raman Ghosh, his long time partner in doubles was also a prominent badminton talent in the country. Ghosh is a former national champion for seven times, in all the three possible categories. Notably in singles, he reached the finals six times but won only once in 1969. Most of the time he finished second to the best singles players of the country that time like Nandu Natekar, Suresh Goel and Dinesh Khanna. In doubles the Ghosh brothers reached every final between 1963 and 1970 by winning the title 5 times during this period.

In the 1970 Thomas Cup tie, India was beaten 2–7 by Indonesia. One of the victories was recorded by the Ghosh brothers, who defeated the pair of Indratno and Mintarja. Ghosh also played in the 1973 Thomas Cup where India lost to Canada 4–5. Other big victories for the Ghosh brothers were against All-England runners-up from Denmark Svend Pri and Per Walsøe when they came to India in 1969; one against Punch Gunalan and Ng Boon Bee, the Malaysian pairing in their home ground; and one against another team from Malaysia, Tan Yee Khan and Boon Bee, winners of the All-England in 1966.

== Playing style ==
In partnership with his brother Raman, Dipu would be the main playmaker, creating the rallies with intricate manoeuvres at the net; also pressing the shuttle down on his opponents’ bodies and inducing them to lift the bird, while his partner employed his power-packed smash from the back.

== Accident ==
In 1968, Dipu was the victim of an accident when a truck cannoned into his scooter from the rear as he was on his way to the Garden Reach court for badminton practice. Dipu was dragged for some distance, and his right thigh was badly injured. Bleeding heavily, he was rushed to the nearest Railway hospital, some 8 km away. He was in the hospital for seven months, and the doctors had ruled him out of playing badminton anymore. However, he returned strongly and won the 1969 Indian nationals by beating Suresh Goel, having defeated Dinesh Khanna in semifinals before. He won the Arjuna Award same year.

== Retirement ==
Dipu retired from international competitive play in early 1973 and moved into coaching while continuing with the Indian Railways, throughout his career in India; and only took voluntary retirement in 1990. He was Iran’s national coach during the 1974 Asian Games and also coached the Indian team before the 1982 Asiad in New Delhi.
