= Nandu Natekar =

Indian badminton player (1933–2021)

Personal information
- Born: 12 May 1933 Sangli State, British India
- Died: 28 July 2021 (aged 88) Pune, Maharashtra, India

Sport
- Country: India
- Sport: Badminton
Medal record
Men's badminton
Representing India
Asian Championships
Bronze medal – third place	1965 Lucknow	Men's team

Nandu M. Natekar (12 May 1933 – 28 July 2021) was an Indian badminton national champion.

== Career ==
Natekar won over 100 national and international titles for India in a career spanning 15 years. Natekar was the first Indian to win a title abroad, in 1956. Natekar was a director of Natekar Sports and Fitness (NSF).

He won the Men's Doubles National Championship a total of six times, Men's Singles National Championship a total of six times, and Mixed Doubles National Championship a total of five times.

He was an alumnus of Ramnarain Ruia College, Mumbai. His son, Gaurav Natekar, is a seven-time Indian National Champion in tennis.

Natekar died in Pune on 28 July 2021 at the age of 88.

== Achievements ==
- Won National level Men's Singles and Doubles Championship, as well as Mixed Doubles, multiple times in India.
- He has reached the last 8 in the All England Championships.
- Included among 'the Greats' in a souvenir published by Malaysia during the Thomas Cup series in 1954–55.
- Men's Singles Champion in the Selangor International Tournament in Kuala Lumpur in 1956. His victory was also the first international victory by an Indian badminton player.
- Recipient of the first Arjuna Award instituted in 1961.
- Voted the most popular sportsperson of India in 1961.
- Natekar and Meena Shaw won the Mixed Doubles title at Bangkok's King's Cup International Tournament in 1962. Won the Men's Singles title at the same event in 1963.
- Represented India at the Commonwealth Games in Jamaica in 1966.
- Awarded Meritorious Service Award by the IBF in 1989.
- Honoured at the Jagatik Marathi Parishad in Mauritius in 1991.
- Awarded Life-time Achievement Award by the Petroleum Sports Control Board of India in January 2001.
- Awarded Sahyadri Navratna Puraskar in 2002, titled Ratna Saurabh.
