= Ami Ghia =

Indian badminton player (born 1956)

Personal information
- Born: 8 December 1956 (age 69) Surat, Gujarat, India

Sport
- Country: India
- Sport: Badminton
- Handedness: Right
- Highest ranking: 7
Medal record
Women's badminton
Representing India
Commonwealth Games
Bronze medal – third place	1978 Edmonton	Women's doubles
Asian Games
Bronze medal – third place	1982 New Delhi	Women's team

Ami Ghia Shah (born 8 December 1956) is an Indian former badminton player. She is a seven-time National singles champion, twelve-time doubles winner and a four-time mixed doubles winner. She received the Arjuna Award in 1976.
