= Aparna Popat =

Indian badminton player

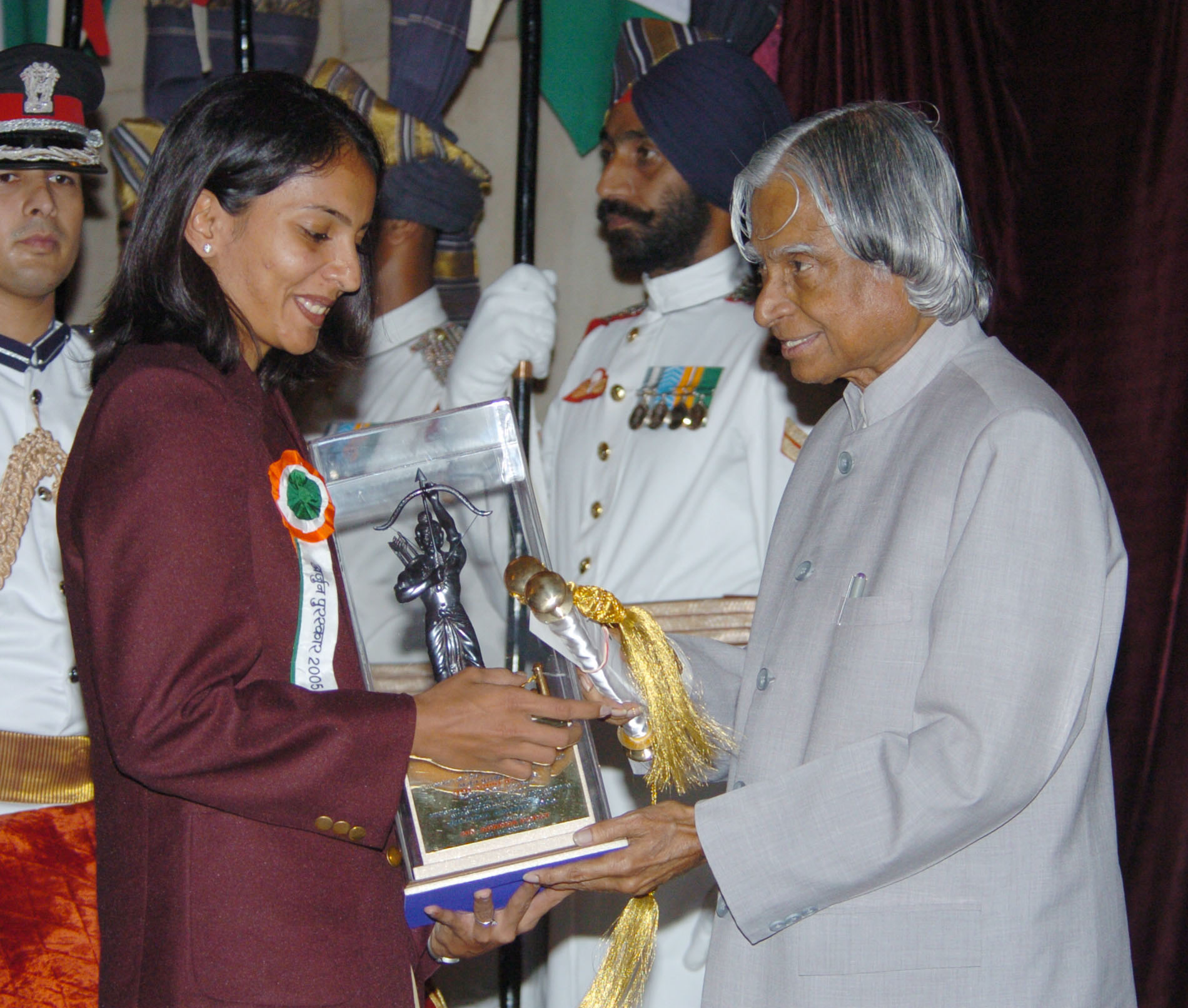
- Popat receiving the Arjuna Award from A. P. J. Abdul Kalam

Personal information
- Born: Aparna Lalji Popat; 18 January 1978 (age 48) Mumbai, Maharashtra, India
- Years active: 1989–2006
- Height: 1.63 m (5 ft 4 in)

Sport
- Country: India
- Sport: Badminton
- Handedness: Right

Women's singles
- Highest ranking: 16 (1997)
- BWF profile
Medal record
Women's badminton
Representing India
Commonwealth Games
Silver medal – second place	1998 Kuala Lumpur	Women's singles
Bronze medal – third place	1998 Kuala lumpur	Women's team
Bronze medal – third place	2002 Manchester	Women's singles
Bronze medal – third place	2006 Melbourne	Mixed team
World Junior Championships
Silver medal – second place	1996 Silkeborg	Girls' singles

Aparna Popat (born 18 January 1978) is a former Indian badminton player. She was India's national champion for a record equaling nine times when she won all the senior national championships between 1997 and 2006.

== Early life ==
Aparna Popat was born on 18 January 1978 in Mumbai, Maharashtra into a Gujarati family of Lalji Popat and Heena Popat. She studied at J. B. Petit High School in Mumbai and attended a pre-university course at Mount Carmel College in Bangalore. Aparna also holds a bachelor's degree in commerce from the Mumbai University.

== Training background ==
Aparna started playing badminton in 1986 in Mumbai. As an 8-year-old, when she approached Anil Pradhan for coaching, he saw a spark in the girl and told her parents "Give me this girl and I will put her on the map of Indian badminton". Being a national champion himself, he helped her develop skills required to face the many challenges of the game.

In 1994, she shifted to the Prakash Padukone Badminton Academy in Bangalore to further expand her capabilities. Training under the legendary Prakash Padukone, a former All-England champion, she built up her fitness and learned techniques to be more competitive at the international level.

Yearning to expand her learning, in 2002 she shifted to the Sports Authority of India training centre at Kengeri, Bangalore where she learnt the nuances of the game under coach Gangula Prasad.

== Career ==
Aparna captured her first Senior National title at Hyderabad in 1997. She went on to win the Senior National title till 2006, thereby equaling the Prakash Padukone's record of winning nine consecutive national singles titles. She won her last of the nine Senior Nationals titles at the age of 27 after defeating the 15-year-old Saina Nehwal at Bangalore in January 2006.

The highlights of her achievements at the international level are participation in 2 Olympic Games, 1 Asian Games, a silver medal at the World Junior Championships in 1996 and 4 medals in 3 Commonwealth Games appearances. She reached career-high world ranking of 16.

- 1989: Won the national title (under-12) title at Bangalore. This was the 1st tournament she played at the national level.
- 1990: Finished runner up in the Nationals in the Sub-Junior girls category (under-15). This was the only year that she did not win the national title in her age group.
- 1991: Won the National Sub-Junior girls title (under-15).
- 1992: Retained the National Sub Junior Girls title (under-15) and was finalist in the Junior girls (under-18) category. Also, got a chance to represent India at the World Junior Championships held at Jakarta. This was her maiden international tournament.
- 1993: Won the Junior National title (under-18) at Pune.
- 1994: Retained the Junior National title (under-18). Represented India at the World Junior Championships held at Kuala Lumpur. This year she also made her foray into the senior category at the international level being part of the Indian squad for the Uber Cup at Prague.
- 1995: Retained the Junior National title (under-18). Finalist at the Senior Nationals.
- 1996: Won bronze medal at Prince Asian Junior Championships at Hong Kong. Later that year, she won a silver medal at the World Junior Championships at Silkeborg, Denmark. This was India's first ever medal at this event. She also retained the Junior National title (under-19) and was finalist at the Senior Nationals held at Pune. Represented India in the Uber Cup.
- 1997: After finishing runners-up in the previous two years, she won her maiden Senior National title at Hyderabad defeating Manjusha Kanwar in straight games.
- 1998: This was one of her most fruitful years as a player. Apart retaining the Senior National title, she won an individual silver medal and team bronze medal at the Commonwealth Games held at Kuala Lumpur. She participated in the Asian Games at Bangkok and the Uber Cup. She also won a gold medal at the Asian Satellite Tournament.
- 1999: Riding on the good form of the previous year, she reached the semi-finals of the Swedish Open and finished runner-up at the French Open. Retained her Senior National title in the Women's singles and finished runner-up in the Women's Doubles category. Won a gold medal at the Asian Satellite Tournament.
- 2000: She represented the country at the Sydney Olympic Games 2000 as India's sole woman's badminton representative. Represented India in the Uber Cup. Retained the Senior National title.
- 2001: Retained the Senior National title. Won a gold medal at the Asian Satellite Tournament.
- 2002: She was the lone Indian medalist at the Commonwealth Games held at Manchester, UK winning a bronze medal in the Women's singles. Retained the Senior National title. Represented India in the Uber Cup.
- 2003: Retained the Senior national title. Won a gold medal at the Asian Satellite Tournament.
- 2004: Participated in her second Olympic Games held at Athens, Greece. She reached the pre-quarter final losing to the eventual silver medalist, Mia Audina in 3 games. At this point in time she was the only Indian woman badminton player to have represented India in 2 Olympics. Retained the Senior National title. Represented India in the Uber Cup.
- 2005: Retained the Senior National title. However, this year she developed a pain in her playing wrist.
- 2006: By this time, the injury was chronic. Yet managed to play the Senior Nationals and win her record 9th consecutive title. Thereafter, represented India in the Uber Cup at Jaipur. She played her 3rd Commonwealth Games at Melbourne, Australia which was the last international tournament she participated in. She reached the quarter-finals in the Women's singles and won a bronze medal in the team championships. The wrist injury forced her to retire from the game. She retired at the top of the game being the No.1 player in the country.

== Achievements ==
=== Commonwealth Games ===
Women's singles
Year	Venue	Opponent	Score	Result
1998	Kuala Lumpur Badminton Stadium; Kuala Lumpur, Malaysia	(Wales) Kelly Morgan	10–13, 5–11	Silver
2002	Bolton Arena; Manchester, England	(England) Tracey Hallam	3–7, 3–7, 1–7	Bronze

=== World Junior Championships ===
Girls' singles
Year	Venue	Opponent	Score	Result
1996	Silkeborg Hallerne; Silkeborg, Denmark	(China) Yu Hua	7–11, 3–11	Silver

=== IBF International ===
Women's singles
Year	Tournament	Opponent	Score	Result
1998	Sri Lanka International	(India) K. Neelima Chowdary	1–11, 13–12, 11–3	(gold) Winner
1998	French International	(Germany) Katja Michalowsky	11–8, 11–4	(gold) Winner
1998	India International	(India) K. Neelima Chowdary	6–11, 11–6, 11–8	(gold) Winner
1999	French International	(China) Zhou Mi	0–11, 2–11	(silver) Runner-up
2001	India International	(India) B. R. Meenakshi	11–5, 11–4	(gold) Winner
2002	India Satellite	(Thailand) Salakjit Ponsana	7–11, 11–8, 5–11	(silver) Runner-up
2003	India Satellite	(Thailand) Salakjit Ponsana	11–4, 10–13, 11–4	(gold) Winner
2005	India Satellite	(India) Saina Nehwal	8–11, 6–11	(silver) Runner-up

== Retirement ==
After 17 years of professional badminton, Popat retired from the game in 2006 after suffering a wrist injury that remained undiagnosed. She remained undefeated at the national championships. Post-retirement, Popat was employed with the Indian Oil Corporation in Mumbai until 2015.

== Coaching ==
Aparna Popat took up the coaching role for the Mumbai Masters in the first edition of the Indian Badminton League.

== Awards ==
Popat received the Arjuna Award in 2005, one of the highest sporting honors awarded by the Government of India.

She was one of seventeen participants from around the world—and the lone Indian—to be selected for the Global Sports Mentoring Programme, an initiative promoted by then-U.S. Secretary of State Hillary Clinton and ESPN. This prestigious programme was aimed at empowering women and girls through sport.
