= Meena Shah =

Indian badminton player

Personal information
- Country: India
- Born: 31 January 1937; Balrampur, Uttar Pradesh, India
- Died: 10 March 2015 (aged 78); Sahara Hospital, Lucknow, Uttar Pradesh, India
Medal record
Women's badminton
Representing India
Asian Championships
Bronze medal – third place	1965 Lucknow	Women's singles

Meena Shah (31 January 1937 – 10 March 2015) was an Indian badminton player. A national badminton champion, she won twelve National titles including seven consecutive women's singles from 1959 to 1965. She was a recipient of the Padma Shri and the Arjuna Award.

== Achievements ==
=== Asian Championships ===
Women's singles

Year	Venue	Opponent	Score	Result
1965	Lucknow, India	(England) Ursula Smith	4–11, 6–11	Bronze

=== International tournaments ===
Women's singles

Year	Tournament	Opponent	Score	Result	Ref
1959	Northern India International	(Thailand) Pratuang Pattabongs	11–9, 9–12, 1–11	(silver) Runner-up	

Mixed doubles

Year	Tournament	Partner	Opponent	Score	Result	Ref
1959	Northern India International	(India) Amrit Diwan	(Thailand) Thanoo Khadjadbhye (Thailand) Pratuang Pattabongs	16–17, 15–7, 5–15	(silver) Runner-up	
