= Dinesh Khanna =

Indian badminton player

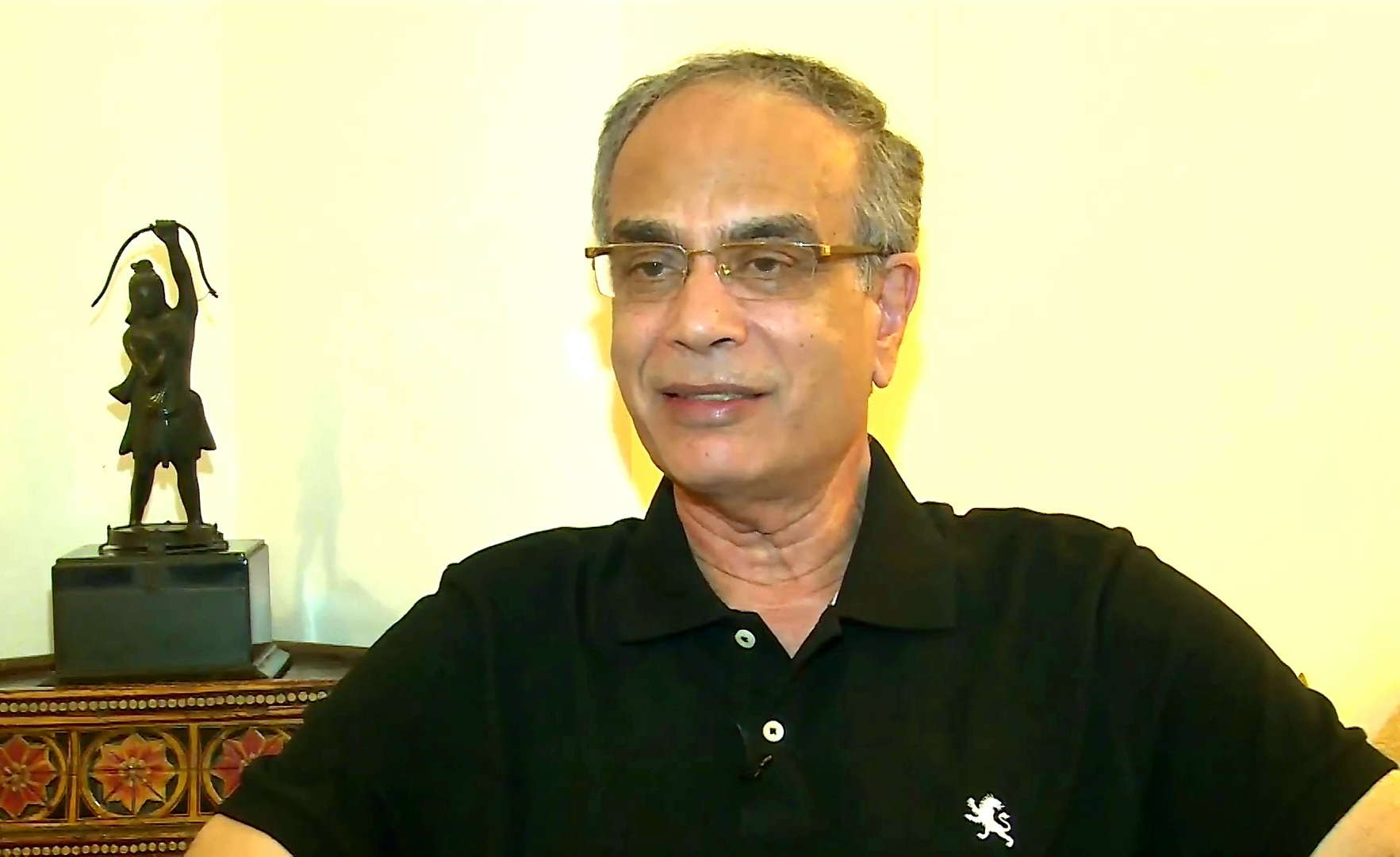

Personal information
- Born: 4 January 1943 (age 83) Fatehgarh Churian, Gurdaspur, Punjab, British India

Sport
- Country: India
- Sport: Badminton
Medal record
Men's badminton
Representing India
Commonwealth Games
Bronze medal – third place	1966 Kingston	Men's singles
Asian Games
Bronze medal – third place	1974 Tehran	Men's Team
Asian Championships
Gold medal – first place	1965 Lucknow	Men's singles
Bronze medal – third place	1969 Manila	Men's singles
Bronze medal – third place	1965 Lucknow	Men's team

Dinesh Kumar Khanna is an Indian former badminton player. Dinesh Khanna belongs to a prominent family of Punjab based out of Fatehgarh Churian (District Gurdaspur). His great-great-grandfather Diwan Tek Chand was a Diwan in the Darbar of Maharaja Ranjit Singh. His father, the late Diwan Dilbagh Rai was an Honorary Magistrate during the British regime and a prominent land owner. Dinesh got married in 1968 to Veena Tuli who was also a sportswomen.

Their Son, Rakesh Khanna, represented Delhi state in the National Badminton championship and their daughter, Ritika was selected to represent Delhi University in Badminton.

Education: Dinesh Khanna is an alumnus of Hindu College (Amritsar), and Punjab Engineering College, Chandigarh (PEC, now a deemed University) from where he completed his engineering degree Bsc. Civil engineering in 1965. He was honoured by PEC in 2017 with distinguished Alumnus Award.

Profession: Served in Indian Oil Corporation and retired as General Manager in 2003.

== Career ==
Dinesh Khanna was the men's singles Asian champion in 1965, and became the first Indian to win an Asian badminton title on 14 November 1965. He won a bronze medal in the 1966 Commonwealth Games . He was Indian national badminton champion in 1966 and a recipient of Arjuna award in 1965. He was the first Indian, post-independence, to reach the semi-finals of the All England Open Badminton Championships, in 1966. Based on his performance in various international tournaments in 1966, he was seeded joint 3rd in 1967 All England championship, which reflected unofficial world ranking, in the absence of regular formal world ranking at that time. Represented India from 1961 to 1976 in various international tournaments, including 5 Thomas Cup series from 1963 to 1976. Runners-up in youth international tournament held in Malaya (now Malaysia) in 1962.

Sports related assignments post playing career:

Chairperson Arjuna Award and Khel Ratan Award selection Committee 2011.

Vice president of BAI (Badminton Association of India) 2000–04.

Associated with SAI as an expert / advisor from time to time.

Observer Badminton, Government of India 2008–14.

Accompanied Indian teams from time to time, as Coach for Select key International events.

Member disciplinary panel of National Anti Doping Agency (NADA) 2009–12.

Member Secretary, Petroleum Sports Promotion board 2000–03.

Honoured with Life Time Achievement Award by PSPB (Petroleum Sports Promotion Board).

He has been running a badminton academy at Siri Fort sports complex since 2003 for basic and Intermediate level players.

== Achievements ==
=== Asian Championships ===
Men's singles
Year	Venue	Opponent	Score	Result
1965	Lucknow, India	(Thailand) Sangob Rattanusorn	15–3, 15–11	Gold
1969	Manila, Philippines	(Malaysia) Punch Gunalan	7–15, 13–18	Bronze

=== Commonwealth Games ===
Men's singles
Year	Venue	Opponent	Score	Result
1966	Kingston, Jamaica	(Scotland) Bob McCoig	15–8, 15–7	Bronze
