= Raman Ghosh =

Indian badminton player

Personal information
- Country: India
- Born: 15 August 1942 (age 82)
Medal record
Men's badminton
Representing India
Asian Games
Bronze medal – third place	1974 Tehran	Men's team
Asian Championships
Bronze medal – third place	1965 Lucknow	Men's team

Romen Ghosh (born 15 August 1942) is an Indian sportsman who represented India in several badminton tournaments in the 1960s and 1970s.

Ghosh was a member of the Indian badminton team, which won the 1975 Thomas Cup qualification by defeating Pakistan at Lahore. He received the Arjuna award for badminton in 1974.

== See also ==
- Dipu Ghosh
