= Suresh Goel =

Indian badminton player

Medal record

Men's badminton

Representing India

Asian Championships
Bronze medal – third place	1965 Lucknow	Men's singles
Bronze medal – third place	1965 Lucknow	Men's team

Suresh Goel (20 June 1943 – 13 April 1978) was an Indian national badminton champion and a recipient of Arjuna award.

== Early life ==
Goel was born in Allahabad in Uttar Pradesh in 1943. He started playing badminton at young age of 10 and at the age of 14 was national junior champion.

== Career ==
He was the men's national singles champion on five occasions from 1962 to 1970 and also won national titles in men's doubles and mixed doubles. He was honoured with Arjuna award in 1967. He represented India in Thomas Cup in 1960-61 and captained the Indian team against Indonesia at Jaipur in 1969–70. He also played in U.S. Open Badminton Championships in 1967 and reached the final where he lost to Erland Kops of Denmark.

Goel played at the prestigious All England Championship many times. He represented India at 1966 Kingston and 1970 Edinburgh Commonwealth Games and in 1972 Munich Olympic Games. In 1978 at the age of 35, he died of heart failure while exercising at the running track of the amphitheatre grounds of the Banaras Hindu University.
