= List of BWF World Championships medalists =

Below is listed the Badminton World Federation's World Championships medalists in the men's and women's singles, also in the men's, women's and mixed doubles events. The champion(s) of the tournament win a gold medal, the runners-up take the silver medal, and both losing semifinalists are awarded bronze medals.

== History ==
Since its inaugural edition in 1977, only 22 countries have achieved at least a bronze medal in the tournament: eleven in Asia, eight in Europe, two in Pan America and one in Oceania. Africa is the only continent that has not won a medal.

The big winner at the first edition in Malmö 1977 was Denmark. The country won three golds, a silver, and a bronze, with Lene Køppen winning gold in both singles and mixed doubles event. At the second edition in Jakarta 1980, the host country sent their players to the finals round in all events. Indonesia had won four titles, except in women's doubles taken by the English pair, Christian Hadinata secured two golds in the men's and mixed doubles events. China and South Korea made their first appearance in the third edition in Copenhagen 1983, and the Chinese team topped the medal standing by winning the women's singles and doubles. China won the remaining three titles in Calgary 1985 and made a truly indelible mark on the next edition by sweeping all five gold medals in Beijing 1987.

At the age of 18, Ratchanok Intanon became the youngest winner of a singles title at the Championships. Ratchanok was less than 3 months older than Jang Hye-ock was when she won the women's doubles title at the 1995 Championships.

In Nanjing 2018, Kento Momota became the first Japanese player to win the gold medal in the men's singles event, also in 2015, he secured first medal for Japan in the men's singles by winning a bronze.

In Basel 2019, for the first time since 1983, China only had one representative in the final round. P.V. Sindhu became the first Indian player to win the gold medal at the World Championships and also became the only other woman singles player along with China's Zhang Ning to have won five World Championship medals. Japanese Kento Momota, and the duo Mayu Matsumoto and Wakana Nagahara retained their titles from the previous edition. Japanese mixed doubles pair Yuta Watanabe and Arisa Higashino and the Thai men's singles player Kantaphon Wangcharoen, became the first players from their countries that won medals in the mixed doubles and men's singles events respectively.

== Men's singles ==
Year	Host city	Gold	Silver	Bronze
1977	Malmö	(Denmark) Flemming Delfs	(Denmark) Svend Pri	(Indonesia) Iie Sumirat
1977	Malmö	(Denmark) Flemming Delfs	(Denmark) Svend Pri	(Sweden) Thomas Kihlström
1980	Jakarta	(Indonesia) Rudy Hartono	(Indonesia) Liem Swie King	(Indonesia) Hadiyanto
1980	Jakarta	(Indonesia) Rudy Hartono	(Indonesia) Liem Swie King	(Indonesia) Lius Pongoh
1983	Copenhagen	(Indonesia) Icuk Sugiarto	(Indonesia) Liem Swie King	(China) Han Jian
1983	Copenhagen	(Indonesia) Icuk Sugiarto	(Indonesia) Liem Swie King	(India) Prakash Padukone
1985	Calgary	(China) Han Jian	(Denmark) Morten Frost	(China) Yang Yang
1985	Calgary	(China) Han Jian	(Denmark) Morten Frost	(Denmark) Jens Peter Nierhoff
1987	Beijing	(China) Yang Yang	(Denmark) Morten Frost	(China) Zhao Jianhua
1987	Beijing	(China) Yang Yang	(Denmark) Morten Frost	(Indonesia) Icuk Sugiarto
1989	Jakarta	(China) Yang Yang	(Indonesia) Ardy Wiranata	(Indonesia) Eddy Kurniawan
1989	Jakarta	(China) Yang Yang	(Indonesia) Ardy Wiranata	(Indonesia) Icuk Sugiarto
1991	Copenhagen	(China) Zhao Jianhua	(Indonesia) Alan Budikusuma	(China) Liu Jun
1991	Copenhagen	(China) Zhao Jianhua	(Indonesia) Alan Budikusuma	(Indonesia) Ardy Wiranata
1993	Birmingham	(Indonesia) Joko Suprianto	(Indonesia) Hermawan Susanto	(Denmark) Thomas Stuer-Lauridsen
1993	Birmingham	(Indonesia) Joko Suprianto	(Indonesia) Hermawan Susanto	(Indonesia) Ardy Wiranata
1995	Lausanne	(Indonesia) Hariyanto Arbi	(South Korea) Park Sung-woo	(Denmark) Poul-Erik Høyer Larsen
1995	Lausanne	(Indonesia) Hariyanto Arbi	(South Korea) Park Sung-woo	(Denmark) Thomas Stuer-Lauridsen
1997	Glasgow	(Denmark) Peter Rasmussen	(China) Sun Jun	(Denmark) Poul-Erik Høyer Larsen
1997	Glasgow	(Denmark) Peter Rasmussen	(China) Sun Jun	(Indonesia) Hariyanto Arbi
1999	Copenhagen	(China) Sun Jun	(Chinese Taipei) Fung Permadi	(Denmark) Peter Gade
1999	Copenhagen	(China) Sun Jun	(Chinese Taipei) Fung Permadi	(Denmark) Poul-Erik Høyer Larsen
2001	Seville	(Indonesia) Hendrawan	(Denmark) Peter Gade	(China) Chen Hong
2001	Seville	(Indonesia) Hendrawan	(Denmark) Peter Gade	(Indonesia) Taufik Hidayat
2003	Birmingham	(China) Xia Xuanze	(Malaysia) Wong Choong Hann	(China) Bao Chunlai
2003	Birmingham	(China) Xia Xuanze	(Malaysia) Wong Choong Hann	(South Korea) Shon Seung-mo
2005	Anaheim	(Indonesia) Taufik Hidayat	(China) Lin Dan	(Denmark) Peter Gade
2005	Anaheim	(Indonesia) Taufik Hidayat	(China) Lin Dan	(Malaysia) Lee Chong Wei
2006	Madrid	(China) Lin Dan	(China) Bao Chunlai	(China) Chen Hong
2006	Madrid	(China) Lin Dan	(China) Bao Chunlai	(South Korea) Lee Hyun-il
2007	Kuala Lumpur	(China) Lin Dan	(Indonesia) Sony Dwi Kuncoro	(China) Bao Chunlai
2007	Kuala Lumpur	(China) Lin Dan	(Indonesia) Sony Dwi Kuncoro	(China) Chen Yu
2009	Hyderabad	(China) Lin Dan	(China) Chen Jin	(Indonesia) Taufik Hidayat
2009	Hyderabad	(China) Lin Dan	(China) Chen Jin	(Indonesia) Sony Dwi Kuncoro
2010	Paris	(China) Chen Jin	(Indonesia) Taufik Hidayat	(Denmark) Peter Gade
2010	Paris	(China) Chen Jin	(Indonesia) Taufik Hidayat	(South Korea) Park Sung-hwan
2011	London	(China) Lin Dan	(Malaysia) Lee Chong Wei	(China) Chen Jin
2011	London	(China) Lin Dan	(Malaysia) Lee Chong Wei	(Denmark) Peter Gade
2013	Guangzhou	(China) Lin Dan	(Malaysia) Lee Chong Wei	(China) Du Pengyu
2013	Guangzhou	(China) Lin Dan	(Malaysia) Lee Chong Wei	(Vietnam) Nguyễn Tiến Minh
2014	Copenhagen	(China) Chen Long	~~(Malaysia) Lee Chong Wei~~ (disqualified)	(Denmark) Viktor Axelsen
2014	Copenhagen	(China) Chen Long	~~(Malaysia) Lee Chong Wei~~ (disqualified)	(Indonesia) Tommy Sugiarto
2015	Jakarta	(China) Chen Long	(Malaysia) Lee Chong Wei	(Denmark) Jan Ø. Jørgensen
2015	Jakarta	(China) Chen Long	(Malaysia) Lee Chong Wei	(Japan) Kento Momota
2017	Glasgow	(Denmark) Viktor Axelsen	(China) Lin Dan	(China) Chen Long
2017	Glasgow	(Denmark) Viktor Axelsen	(China) Lin Dan	(South Korea) Son Wan-ho
2018	Nanjing	(Japan) Kento Momota	(China) Shi Yuqi	(China) Chen Long
2018	Nanjing	(Japan) Kento Momota	(China) Shi Yuqi	(Malaysia) Liew Daren
2019	Basel	(Japan) Kento Momota	(Denmark) Anders Antonsen	(India) B. Sai Praneeth
2019	Basel	(Japan) Kento Momota	(Denmark) Anders Antonsen	(Thailand) Kantaphon Wangcharoen
2021	Huelva	(Singapore) Loh Kean Yew	(India) Srikanth Kidambi	(Denmark) Anders Antonsen
2021	Huelva	(Singapore) Loh Kean Yew	(India) Srikanth Kidambi	(India) Lakshya Sen
2022	Tokyo	(Denmark) Viktor Axelsen	(Thailand) Kunlavut Vitidsarn	(Chinese Taipei) Chou Tien-chen
2022	Tokyo	(Denmark) Viktor Axelsen	(Thailand) Kunlavut Vitidsarn	(China) Zhao Junpeng
2023	Copenhagen	(Thailand) Kunlavut Vitidsarn	(Japan) Kodai Naraoka	(India) Prannoy H. S.
2023	Copenhagen	(Thailand) Kunlavut Vitidsarn	(Japan) Kodai Naraoka	(Denmark) Anders Antonsen
2025	Paris	(China) Shi Yuqi	(Thailand) Kunlavut Vitidsarn	(Canada) Victor Lai
2025	Paris	(China) Shi Yuqi	(Thailand) Kunlavut Vitidsarn	(Denmark) Anders Antonsen
2026	New Delhi	(France) Alex Lanier	(Japan) Kodai Naraoka	(Chinese Taipei) Chou Tien-chen
2026	New Delhi	(France) Alex Lanier	(Japan) Kodai Naraoka	(Canada) Victor Lai

== Women's singles ==
Year	Host city	Gold	Silver	Bronze
1977	Malmö	(Denmark) Lene Køppen	(England) Gillian Gilks	(England) Margaret Lockwood
1977	Malmö	(Denmark) Lene Køppen	(England) Gillian Gilks	(Japan) Hiroe Yuki
1980	Jakarta	(Indonesia) Verawaty Fadjrin	(Indonesia) Ivana Lie	(Denmark) Lene Køppen
1980	Jakarta	(Indonesia) Verawaty Fadjrin	(Indonesia) Ivana Lie	(Indonesia) Taty Sumirah
1983	Copenhagen	(China) Li Lingwei	(China) Han Aiping	(China) Zhang Ailing
1983	Copenhagen	(China) Li Lingwei	(China) Han Aiping	(England) Helen Troke
1985	Calgary	(China) Han Aiping	(China) Wu Jianqui	(China) Li Lingwei
1985	Calgary	(China) Han Aiping	(China) Wu Jianqui	(China) Zheng Yuli
1987	Beijing	(China) Han Aiping	(China) Li Lingwei	(China) Gu Jiaming
1987	Beijing	(China) Han Aiping	(China) Li Lingwei	(China) Zheng Yuli
1989	Jakarta	(China) Li Lingwei	(China) Huang Hua	(China) Tang Jiuhong
1989	Jakarta	(China) Li Lingwei	(China) Huang Hua	(Indonesia) Sarwendah Kusumawardhani
1991	Copenhagen	(China) Tang Jiuhong	(Indonesia) Sarwendah Kusumawardhani	(Indonesia) Susi Susanti
1991	Copenhagen	(China) Tang Jiuhong	(Indonesia) Sarwendah Kusumawardhani	(South Korea) Lee Heung-soon
1993	Birmingham	(Indonesia) Susi Susanti	(South Korea) Bang Soo-hyun	(China) Tang Jiuhong
1993	Birmingham	(Indonesia) Susi Susanti	(South Korea) Bang Soo-hyun	(China) Ye Zhaoying
1995	Lausanne	(China) Ye Zhaoying	(China) Han Jingna	(Indonesia) Susi Susanti
1995	Lausanne	(China) Ye Zhaoying	(China) Han Jingna	(South Korea) Bang Soo-hyun
1997	Glasgow	(China) Ye Zhaoying	(China) Gong Zhichao	(China) Han Jingna
1997	Glasgow	(China) Ye Zhaoying	(China) Gong Zhichao	(China) Wang Chen
1999	Copenhagen	(Denmark) Camilla Martin	(China) Dai Yun	(China) Gong Ruina
1999	Copenhagen	(Denmark) Camilla Martin	(China) Dai Yun	(Denmark) Mette Sørensen
2001	Seville	(China) Gong Ruina	(China) Zhou Mi	(China) Gong Zhichao
2001	Seville	(China) Gong Ruina	(China) Zhou Mi	(China) Zhang Ning
2003	Birmingham	(China) Zhang Ning	(China) Gong Ruina	(China) Zhou Mi
2003	Birmingham	(China) Zhang Ning	(China) Gong Ruina	(Netherlands) Mia Audina
2005	Anaheim	(China) Xie Xingfang	(China) Zhang Ning	(Germany) Xu Huaiwen
2005	Anaheim	(China) Xie Xingfang	(China) Zhang Ning	(Chinese Taipei) Cheng Shao-chieh
2006	Madrid	(China) Xie Xingfang	(China) Zhang Ning	(Germany) Petra Overzier
2006	Madrid	(China) Xie Xingfang	(China) Zhang Ning	(Germany) Xu Huaiwen
2007	Kuala Lumpur	(China) Zhu Lin	(Hong Kong) Wang Chen	(China) Lu Lan
2007	Kuala Lumpur	(China) Zhu Lin	(Hong Kong) Wang Chen	(China) Zhang Ning
2009	Hyderabad	(China) Lu Lan	(China) Xie Xingfang	(China) Wang Lin
2009	Hyderabad	(China) Lu Lan	(China) Xie Xingfang	(France) Pi Hongyan
2010	Paris	(China) Wang Lin	(China) Wang Xin	(China) Wang Shixian
2010	Paris	(China) Wang Lin	(China) Wang Xin	(Denmark) Tine Baun
2011	London	(China) Wang Yihan	(Chinese Taipei) Cheng Shao-chieh	(China) Wang Xin
2011	London	(China) Wang Yihan	(Chinese Taipei) Cheng Shao-chieh	(Germany) Juliane Schenk
2013	Guangzhou	(Thailand) Ratchanok Intanon	(China) Li Xuerui	(India) P. V. Sindhu
2013	Guangzhou	(Thailand) Ratchanok Intanon	(China) Li Xuerui	(South Korea) Bae Yeon-ju
2014	Copenhagen	(Spain) Carolina Marín	(China) Li Xuerui	(India) P. V. Sindhu
2014	Copenhagen	(Spain) Carolina Marín	(China) Li Xuerui	(Japan) Minatsu Mitani
2015	Jakarta	(Spain) Carolina Marín	(India) Saina Nehwal	(Indonesia) Lindaweni Fanetri
2015	Jakarta	(Spain) Carolina Marín	(India) Saina Nehwal	(South Korea) Sung Ji-hyun
2017	Glasgow	(Japan) Nozomi Okuhara	(India) P. V. Sindhu	(China) Chen Yufei
2017	Glasgow	(Japan) Nozomi Okuhara	(India) P. V. Sindhu	(India) Saina Nehwal
2018	Nanjing	(Spain) Carolina Marín	(India) P. V. Sindhu	(China) He Bingjiao
2018	Nanjing	(Spain) Carolina Marín	(India) P. V. Sindhu	(Japan) Akane Yamaguchi
2019	Basel	(India) P. V. Sindhu	(Japan) Nozomi Okuhara	(China) Chen Yufei
2019	Basel	(India) P. V. Sindhu	(Japan) Nozomi Okuhara	(Thailand) Ratchanok Intanon
2021	Huelva	(Japan) Akane Yamaguchi	(Chinese Taipei) Tai Tzu-ying	(China) He Bingjiao
2021	Huelva	(Japan) Akane Yamaguchi	(Chinese Taipei) Tai Tzu-ying	(China) Zhang Yiman
2022	Tokyo	(Japan) Akane Yamaguchi	(China) Chen Yufei	(South Korea) An Se-young
2022	Tokyo	(Japan) Akane Yamaguchi	(China) Chen Yufei	(Chinese Taipei) Tai Tzu-ying
2023	Copenhagen	(South Korea) An Se-young	(Spain) Carolina Marín	(China) Chen Yufei
2023	Copenhagen	(South Korea) An Se-young	(Spain) Carolina Marín	(Japan) Akane Yamaguchi
2025	Paris	(Japan) Akane Yamaguchi	(China) Chen Yufei	(South Korea) An Se-young
2025	Paris	(Japan) Akane Yamaguchi	(China) Chen Yufei	(Indonesia) Putri Kusuma Wardani
2026	New Delhi	(South Korea) An Se-young	(Japan) Akane Yamaguchi	(China) Wang Zhiyi
2026	New Delhi	(South Korea) An Se-young	(Japan) Akane Yamaguchi	(Thailand) Pornpawee Chochuwong

== Men's doubles ==
Year	Host city	Gold	Silver	Bronze
1977	Malmö	(Indonesia) Tjun Tjun (Indonesia) Johan Wahjudi	(Indonesia) Ade Chandra (Indonesia) Christian Hadinata	(England) Ray Stevens (England) Mike Tredgett
1977	Malmö	(Indonesia) Tjun Tjun (Indonesia) Johan Wahjudi	(Indonesia) Ade Chandra (Indonesia) Christian Hadinata	(Sweden) Bengt Fröman (Sweden) Thomas Kihlström
1980	Jakarta	(Indonesia) Ade Chandra (Indonesia) Christian Hadinata	(Indonesia) Rudy Heryanto (Indonesia) Hariamanto Kartono	(Denmark) Flemming Delfs (Denmark) Steen Skovgaard
1980	Jakarta	(Indonesia) Ade Chandra (Indonesia) Christian Hadinata	(Indonesia) Rudy Heryanto (Indonesia) Hariamanto Kartono	(Malaysia) Jalani Sidek (Malaysia) Misbun Sidek
1983	Copenhagen	(Denmark) Steen Fladberg (Denmark) Jesper Helledie	(England) Martin Dew (England) Mike Tredgett	(Indonesia) Bobby Ertanto (Indonesia) Christian Hadinata
1983	Copenhagen	(Denmark) Steen Fladberg (Denmark) Jesper Helledie	(England) Martin Dew (England) Mike Tredgett	(South Korea) Lee Eun-ku (South Korea) Park Joo-bong
1985	Calgary	(South Korea) Kim Moon-soo (South Korea) Park Joo-bong	(China) Li Yongbo (China) Tian Bingyi	(Denmark) Mark Christiansen (Denmark) Michael Kjeldsen
1985	Calgary	(South Korea) Kim Moon-soo (South Korea) Park Joo-bong	(China) Li Yongbo (China) Tian Bingyi	(Indonesia) Hariamanto Kartono (Indonesia) Liem Swie King
1987	Beijing	(China) Li Yongbo (China) Tian Bingyi	(Malaysia) Jalani Sidek (Malaysia) Razif Sidek	(Denmark) Michael Kjeldsen (Denmark) Jens Peter Nierhoff
1987	Beijing	(China) Li Yongbo (China) Tian Bingyi	(Malaysia) Jalani Sidek (Malaysia) Razif Sidek	(South Korea) Kim Moon-soo (South Korea) Park Joo-bong
1989	Jakarta	(China) Li Yongbo (China) Tian Bingyi	(China) Chen Hongyong (China) Chen Kang	(Indonesia) Rudy Gunawan (Indonesia) Eddy Hartono
1989	Jakarta	(China) Li Yongbo (China) Tian Bingyi	(China) Chen Hongyong (China) Chen Kang	(Malaysia) Jalani Sidek (Malaysia) Razif Sidek
1991	Copenhagen	(South Korea) Kim Moon-soo (South Korea) Park Joo-bong	(Denmark) Jon Holst-Christensen (Denmark) Thomas Lund	(China) Li Yongbo (China) Tian Bingyi
1991	Copenhagen	(South Korea) Kim Moon-soo (South Korea) Park Joo-bong	(Denmark) Jon Holst-Christensen (Denmark) Thomas Lund	(Indonesia) Imay Hendra (Indonesia) Bagus Setiadi
1993	Birmingham	(Indonesia) Rudy Gunawan (Indonesia) Ricky Subagja	(Malaysia) Cheah Soon Kit (Malaysia) Soo Beng Kiang	(China) Chen Hongyong (China) Chen Kang
1993	Birmingham	(Indonesia) Rudy Gunawan (Indonesia) Ricky Subagja	(Malaysia) Cheah Soon Kit (Malaysia) Soo Beng Kiang	(Sweden) Peter Axelsson (Sweden) Pär-Gunnar Jönsson
1995	Lausanne	(Indonesia) Rexy Mainaky (Indonesia) Ricky Subagja	(Denmark) Jon Holst-Christensen (Denmark) Thomas Lund	(Malaysia) Cheah Soon Kit (Malaysia) Yap Kim Hock
1995	Lausanne	(Indonesia) Rexy Mainaky (Indonesia) Ricky Subagja	(Denmark) Jon Holst-Christensen (Denmark) Thomas Lund	(South Korea) Kim Dong-moon (South Korea) Yoo Yong-sung
1997	Glasgow	(Indonesia) Sigit Budiarto (Indonesia) Candra Wijaya	(Malaysia) Cheah Soon Kit (Malaysia) Yap Kim Hock	(Indonesia) Rexy Mainaky (Indonesia) Ricky Subagja
1997	Glasgow	(Indonesia) Sigit Budiarto (Indonesia) Candra Wijaya	(Malaysia) Cheah Soon Kit (Malaysia) Yap Kim Hock	(South Korea) Lee Dong-soo (South Korea) Yoo Yong-sung
1999	Copenhagen	(South Korea) Ha Tae-kwon (South Korea) Kim Dong-moon	(South Korea) Lee Dong-soo (South Korea) Yoo Yong-sung	(China) Zhang Jun (China) Zhang Wei
1999	Copenhagen	(South Korea) Ha Tae-kwon (South Korea) Kim Dong-moon	(South Korea) Lee Dong-soo (South Korea) Yoo Yong-sung	(England) Simon Archer (England) Nathan Robertson
2001	Seville	(Indonesia) Tony Gunawan (Indonesia) Halim Haryanto	(South Korea) Ha Tae-kwon (South Korea) Kim Dong-moon	(Malaysia) Chan Chong Ming (Malaysia) Chew Choon Eng
2001	Seville	(Indonesia) Tony Gunawan (Indonesia) Halim Haryanto	(South Korea) Ha Tae-kwon (South Korea) Kim Dong-moon	(Malaysia) Choong Tan Fook (Malaysia) Lee Wan Wah
2003	Birmingham	(Denmark) Lars Paaske (Denmark) Jonas Rasmussen	(Indonesia) Sigit Budiarto (Indonesia) Candra Wijaya	(China) Cai Yun (China) Fu Haifeng
2003	Birmingham	(Denmark) Lars Paaske (Denmark) Jonas Rasmussen	(Indonesia) Sigit Budiarto (Indonesia) Candra Wijaya	(China) Sang Yang (China) Zheng Bo
2005	Anaheim	(United States) Howard Bach (United States) Tony Gunawan	(Indonesia) Sigit Budiarto (Indonesia) Candra Wijaya	(Indonesia) Luluk Hadiyanto (Indonesia) Alvent Yulianto
2005	Anaheim	(United States) Howard Bach (United States) Tony Gunawan	(Indonesia) Sigit Budiarto (Indonesia) Candra Wijaya	(Malaysia) Chan Chong Ming (Malaysia) Koo Kien Keat
2006	Madrid	(China) Cai Yun (China) Fu Haifeng	(England) Robert Blair (England) Anthony Clark	(Denmark) Jens Eriksen (Denmark) Martin Lundgaard Hansen
2006	Madrid	(China) Cai Yun (China) Fu Haifeng	(England) Robert Blair (England) Anthony Clark	(Denmark) Lars Paaske (Denmark) Jonas Rasmussen
2007	Kuala Lumpur	(Indonesia) Markis Kido (Indonesia) Hendra Setiawan	(South Korea) Jung Jae-sung (South Korea) Lee Yong-dae	(Japan) Shintaro Ikeda (Japan) Shuichi Sakamoto
2007	Kuala Lumpur	(Indonesia) Markis Kido (Indonesia) Hendra Setiawan	(South Korea) Jung Jae-sung (South Korea) Lee Yong-dae	(Malaysia) Choong Tan Fook (Malaysia) Lee Wan Wah
2009	Hyderabad	(China) Cai Yun (China) Fu Haifeng	(South Korea) Jung Jae-sung (South Korea) Lee Yong-dae	(Malaysia) Mohd Zakry Abdul Latif (Malaysia) Mohd Fairuzizuan Mohd Tazari
2009	Hyderabad	(China) Cai Yun (China) Fu Haifeng	(South Korea) Jung Jae-sung (South Korea) Lee Yong-dae	(Malaysia) Koo Kien Keat (Malaysia) Tan Boon Heong
2010	Paris	(China) Cai Yun (China) Fu Haifeng	(Malaysia) Koo Kien Keat (Malaysia) Tan Boon Heong	(China) Guo Zhendong (China) Xu Chen
2010	Paris	(China) Cai Yun (China) Fu Haifeng	(Malaysia) Koo Kien Keat (Malaysia) Tan Boon Heong	(Indonesia) Markis Kido (Indonesia) Hendra Setiawan
2011	London	(China) Cai Yun (China) Fu Haifeng	(South Korea) Ko Sung-hyun (South Korea) Yoo Yeon-seong	(Indonesia) Mohammad Ahsan (Indonesia) Bona Septano
2011	London	(China) Cai Yun (China) Fu Haifeng	(South Korea) Ko Sung-hyun (South Korea) Yoo Yeon-seong	(South Korea) Jung Jae-sung (South Korea) Lee Yong-dae
2013	Guangzhou	(Indonesia) Mohammad Ahsan (Indonesia) Hendra Setiawan	(Denmark) Mathias Boe (Denmark) Carsten Mogensen	(China) Cai Yun (China) Fu Haifeng
2013	Guangzhou	(Indonesia) Mohammad Ahsan (Indonesia) Hendra Setiawan	(Denmark) Mathias Boe (Denmark) Carsten Mogensen	(South Korea) Kim Ki-jung (South Korea) Kim Sa-rang
2014	Copenhagen	(South Korea) Ko Sung-hyun (South Korea) Shin Baek-cheol	(South Korea) Lee Yong-dae (South Korea) Yoo Yeon-seong	(Denmark) Mathias Boe (Denmark) Carsten Mogensen
2014	Copenhagen	(South Korea) Ko Sung-hyun (South Korea) Shin Baek-cheol	(South Korea) Lee Yong-dae (South Korea) Yoo Yeon-seong	(South Korea) Kim Ki-jung (South Korea) Kim Sa-rang
2015	Jakarta	(Indonesia) Mohammad Ahsan (Indonesia) Hendra Setiawan	(China) Liu Xiaolong (China) Qiu Zihan	(South Korea) Lee Yong-dae (South Korea) Yoo Yeon-seong
2015	Jakarta	(Indonesia) Mohammad Ahsan (Indonesia) Hendra Setiawan	(China) Liu Xiaolong (China) Qiu Zihan	(Japan) Hiroyuki Endo (Japan) Kenichi Hayakawa
2017	Glasgow	(China) Liu Cheng (China) Zhang Nan	(Indonesia) Mohammad Ahsan (Indonesia) Rian Agung Saputro	(China) Chai Biao (China) Hong Wei
2017	Glasgow	(China) Liu Cheng (China) Zhang Nan	(Indonesia) Mohammad Ahsan (Indonesia) Rian Agung Saputro	(Japan) Takeshi Kamura (Japan) Keigo Sonoda
2018	Nanjing	(China) Li Junhui (China) Liu Yuchen	(Japan) Takeshi Kamura (Japan) Keigo Sonoda	(China) Liu Cheng (China) Zhang Nan
2018	Nanjing	(China) Li Junhui (China) Liu Yuchen	(Japan) Takeshi Kamura (Japan) Keigo Sonoda	(Chinese Taipei) Chen Hung-ling (Chinese Taipei) Wang Chi-lin
2019	Basel	(Indonesia) Mohammad Ahsan (Indonesia) Hendra Setiawan	(Japan) Takuro Hoki (Japan) Yugo Kobayashi	(China) Li Junhui (China) Liu Yuchen
2019	Basel	(Indonesia) Mohammad Ahsan (Indonesia) Hendra Setiawan	(Japan) Takuro Hoki (Japan) Yugo Kobayashi	(Indonesia) Fajar Alfian (Indonesia) Muhammad Rian Ardianto
2021	Huelva	(Japan) Takuro Hoki (Japan) Yugo Kobayashi	(China) He Jiting (China) Tan Qiang	(Denmark) Kim Astrup (Denmark) Anders Skaarup Rasmussen
2021	Huelva	(Japan) Takuro Hoki (Japan) Yugo Kobayashi	(China) He Jiting (China) Tan Qiang	(Malaysia) Ong Yew Sin (Malaysia) Teo Ee Yi
2022	Tokyo	(Malaysia) Aaron Chia (Malaysia) Soh Wooi Yik	(Indonesia) Mohammad Ahsan (Indonesia) Hendra Setiawan	(Indonesia) Fajar Alfian (Indonesia) Muhammad Rian Ardianto
2022	Tokyo	(Malaysia) Aaron Chia (Malaysia) Soh Wooi Yik	(Indonesia) Mohammad Ahsan (Indonesia) Hendra Setiawan	(India) Satwiksairaj Rankireddy (India) Chirag Shetty
2023	Copenhagen	(South Korea) Kang Min-hyuk (South Korea) Seo Seung-jae	(Denmark) Kim Astrup (Denmark) Anders Skaarup Rasmussen	(Malaysia) Aaron Chia (Malaysia) Soh Wooi Yik
2023	Copenhagen	(South Korea) Kang Min-hyuk (South Korea) Seo Seung-jae	(Denmark) Kim Astrup (Denmark) Anders Skaarup Rasmussen	(China) Liang Weikeng (China) Wang Chang
2025	Paris	(South Korea) Kim Won-ho (South Korea) Seo Seung-jae	(China) Chen Boyang (China) Liu Yi	(Denmark) Kim Astrup (Denmark) Anders Skaarup Rasmussen
2025	Paris	(South Korea) Kim Won-ho (South Korea) Seo Seung-jae	(China) Chen Boyang (China) Liu Yi	(India) Satwiksairaj Rankireddy (India) Chirag Shetty
2026	New Delhi	(China) Liang Weikeng (China) Wang Chang	(Malaysia) Aaron Chia (Malaysia) Soh Wooi Yik	(South Korea) Kim Won-ho (South Korea) Seo Seung-jae
2026	New Delhi	(China) Liang Weikeng (China) Wang Chang	(Malaysia) Aaron Chia (Malaysia) Soh Wooi Yik	(Chinese Taipei) Lee Jhe-huei (Chinese Taipei) Yang Po-hsuan

== Women's doubles ==
Year	Host city	Gold	Silver	Bronze
1977	Malmö	(Japan) Etsuko Toganoo (Japan) Emiko Ueno	(Netherlands) Marjan Ridder (Netherlands) Joke van Beusekom	(Denmark) Inge Borgstrøm (Denmark) Pia Nielsen
1977	Malmö	(Japan) Etsuko Toganoo (Japan) Emiko Ueno	(Netherlands) Marjan Ridder (Netherlands) Joke van Beusekom	(England) Margaret Beck (England) Nora Perry
1980	Jakarta	(England) Nora Perry (England) Jane Webster	(Indonesia) Verawaty Fadjrin (Indonesia) Imelda Wiguna	(England) Karen Bridge (England) Barbara Sutton
1980	Jakarta	(England) Nora Perry (England) Jane Webster	(Indonesia) Verawaty Fadjrin (Indonesia) Imelda Wiguna	(Japan) Atsuko Tokuda (Japan) Yoshiko Yonekura
1983	Copenhagen	(China) Lin Ying (China) Wu Dixi	(England) Nora Perry (England) Jane Webster	(China) Wu Jianqiu (China) Xu Rong
1983	Copenhagen	(China) Lin Ying (China) Wu Dixi	(England) Nora Perry (England) Jane Webster	(England) Gillian Clark (England) Gillian Gilks
1985	Calgary	(China) Han Aiping (China) Li Lingwei	(China) Lin Ying (China) Wu Dixi	(South Korea) Hwang Sun-ae (South Korea) Kang Haeng-suk
1985	Calgary	(China) Han Aiping (China) Li Lingwei	(China) Lin Ying (China) Wu Dixi	(South Korea) Kim Yun-ja (South Korea) Yoo Sang-hee
1987	Beijing	(China) Guan Weizhen (China) Lin Ying	(China) Han Aiping (China) Li Lingwei	(South Korea) Chung Myung-hee (South Korea) Hwang Hye-young
1987	Beijing	(China) Guan Weizhen (China) Lin Ying	(China) Han Aiping (China) Li Lingwei	(South Korea) Chung So-young (South Korea) Kim Yun-ja
1989	Jakarta	(China) Guan Weizhen (China) Lin Ying	(South Korea) Chung Myung-hee (South Korea) Hwang Hye-young	(China) Sun Xiaoqing (China) Zhou Lei
1989	Jakarta	(China) Guan Weizhen (China) Lin Ying	(South Korea) Chung Myung-hee (South Korea) Hwang Hye-young	(Sweden) Maria Bengtsson (Sweden) Christine Magnusson
1991	Copenhagen	(China) Guan Weizhen (China) Nong Qunhua	(Sweden) Maria Bengtsson (Sweden) Christine Magnusson	(South Korea) Chung So-young (South Korea) Hwang Hye-young
1991	Copenhagen	(China) Guan Weizhen (China) Nong Qunhua	(Sweden) Maria Bengtsson (Sweden) Christine Magnusson	(South Korea) Gil Young-ah (South Korea) Shim Eun-jung
1993	Birmingham	(China) Nong Qunhua (China) Zhou Lei	(China) Chen Ying (China) Wu Yuhong	(Denmark) Lotte Olsen (Denmark) Lisbeth Stuer-Lauridsen
1993	Birmingham	(China) Nong Qunhua (China) Zhou Lei	(China) Chen Ying (China) Wu Yuhong	(South Korea) Chung So-young (South Korea) Gil Young-ah
1995	Lausanne	(South Korea) Gil Young-ah (South Korea) Jang Hye-ock	(Indonesia) Finarsih (Indonesia) Lili Tampi	(China) Qin Yiyuan (China) Tang Yongshu
1995	Lausanne	(South Korea) Gil Young-ah (South Korea) Jang Hye-ock	(Indonesia) Finarsih (Indonesia) Lili Tampi	(Denmark) Helene Kirkegaard (Denmark) Rikke Olsen
1997	Glasgow	(China) Ge Fei (China) Gu Jun	(China) Qin Yiyuan (China) Tang Yongshu	(China) Liu Lu (China) Qiang Hong
1997	Glasgow	(China) Ge Fei (China) Gu Jun	(China) Qin Yiyuan (China) Tang Yongshu	(Indonesia) Eliza Nathanael (Indonesia) Zelin Resiana
1999	Copenhagen	(China) Ge Fei (China) Gu Jun	(South Korea) Chung Jae-hee (South Korea) Ra Kyung-min	(China) Gao Ling (China) Qin Yiyuan
1999	Copenhagen	(China) Ge Fei (China) Gu Jun	(South Korea) Chung Jae-hee (South Korea) Ra Kyung-min	(Denmark) Ann Jørgensen (Denmark) Majken Vange
2001	Seville	(China) Gao Ling (China) Huang Sui	(China) Wei Yili (China) Zhang Jiewen	(China) Chen Lin (China) Jiang Xuelian
2001	Seville	(China) Gao Ling (China) Huang Sui	(China) Wei Yili (China) Zhang Jiewen	(South Korea) Lee Kyung-won (South Korea) Ra Kyung-min
2003	Birmingham	(China) Gao Ling (China) Huang Sui	(China) Wei Yili (China) Zhao Tingting	(Denmark) Ann-Lou Jørgensen (Denmark) Rikke Olsen
2003	Birmingham	(China) Gao Ling (China) Huang Sui	(China) Wei Yili (China) Zhao Tingting	(Japan) Seiko Yamada (Japan) Shizuka Yamamoto
2005	Anaheim	(China) Yang Wei (China) Zhang Jiewen	(China) Gao Ling (China) Huang Sui	(China) Zhang Dan (China) Zhang Yawen
2005	Anaheim	(China) Yang Wei (China) Zhang Jiewen	(China) Gao Ling (China) Huang Sui	(South Korea) Lee Hyo-jung (South Korea) Lee Kyung-won
2006	Madrid	(China) Gao Ling (China) Huang Sui	(China) Wei Yili (China) Zhang Yawen	(China) Du Jing (China) Yu Yang
2006	Madrid	(China) Gao Ling (China) Huang Sui	(China) Wei Yili (China) Zhang Yawen	(China) Yang Wei (China) Zhang Jiewen
2007	Kuala Lumpur	(China) Yang Wei (China) Zhang Jiewen	(China) Gao Ling (China) Huang Sui	(China) Wei Yili (China) Zhang Yawen
2007	Kuala Lumpur	(China) Yang Wei (China) Zhang Jiewen	(China) Gao Ling (China) Huang Sui	(Japan) Kumiko Ogura (Japan) Reiko Shiota
2009	Hyderabad	(China) Zhang Yawen (China) Zhao Tingting	(China) Cheng Shu (China) Zhao Yunlei	(China) Du Jing (China) Yu Yang
2009	Hyderabad	(China) Zhang Yawen (China) Zhao Tingting	(China) Cheng Shu (China) Zhao Yunlei	(China) Ma Jin (China) Wang Xiaoli
2010	Paris	(China) Du Jing (China) Yu Yang	(China) Ma Jin (China) Wang Xiaoli	(China) Cheng Shu (China) Zhao Yunlei
2010	Paris	(China) Du Jing (China) Yu Yang	(China) Ma Jin (China) Wang Xiaoli	(Chinese Taipei) Cheng Wen-hsing (Chinese Taipei) Chien Yu-chin
2011	London	(China) Wang Xiaoli (China) Yu Yang	(China) Tian Qing (China) Zhao Yunlei	(India) Jwala Gutta (India) Ashwini Ponnappa
2011	London	(China) Wang Xiaoli (China) Yu Yang	(China) Tian Qing (China) Zhao Yunlei	(Japan) Miyuki Maeda (Japan) Satoko Suetsuna
2013	Guangzhou	(China) Wang Xiaoli (China) Yu Yang	(South Korea) Eom Hye-won (South Korea) Chang Ye-na	(China) Tian Qing (China) Zhao Yunlei
2013	Guangzhou	(China) Wang Xiaoli (China) Yu Yang	(South Korea) Eom Hye-won (South Korea) Chang Ye-na	(Denmark) Kamilla Rytter Juhl (Denmark) Christinna Pedersen
2014	Copenhagen	(China) Tian Qing (China) Zhao Yunlei	(China) Wang Xiaoli (China) Yu Yang	(Japan) Reika Kakiiwa (Japan) Miyuki Maeda
2014	Copenhagen	(China) Tian Qing (China) Zhao Yunlei	(China) Wang Xiaoli (China) Yu Yang	(South Korea) Lee So-hee (South Korea) Shin Seung-chan
2015	Jakarta	(China) Tian Qing (China) Zhao Yunlei	(Denmark) Kamilla Rytter Juhl (Denmark) Christinna Pedersen	(Indonesia) Nitya Krishinda Maheswari (Indonesia) Greysia Polii
2015	Jakarta	(China) Tian Qing (China) Zhao Yunlei	(Denmark) Kamilla Rytter Juhl (Denmark) Christinna Pedersen	(Japan) Naoko Fukuman (Japan) Kurumi Yonao
2017	Glasgow	(China) Chen Qingchen (China) Jia Yifan	(Japan) Yuki Fukushima (Japan) Sayaka Hirota	(Denmark) Kamilla Rytter Juhl (Denmark) Christinna Pedersen
2017	Glasgow	(China) Chen Qingchen (China) Jia Yifan	(Japan) Yuki Fukushima (Japan) Sayaka Hirota	(Japan) Misaki Matsutomo (Japan) Ayaka Takahashi
2018	Nanjing	(Japan) Mayu Matsumoto (Japan) Wakana Nagahara	(Japan) Yuki Fukushima (Japan) Sayaka Hirota	(Indonesia) Greysia Polii (Indonesia) Apriyani Rahayu
2018	Nanjing	(Japan) Mayu Matsumoto (Japan) Wakana Nagahara	(Japan) Yuki Fukushima (Japan) Sayaka Hirota	(Japan) Shiho Tanaka (Japan) Koharu Yonemoto
2019	Basel	(Japan) Mayu Matsumoto (Japan) Wakana Nagahara	(Japan) Yuki Fukushima (Japan) Sayaka Hirota	(China) Du Yue (China) Li Yinhui
2019	Basel	(Japan) Mayu Matsumoto (Japan) Wakana Nagahara	(Japan) Yuki Fukushima (Japan) Sayaka Hirota	(Indonesia) Greysia Polii (Indonesia) Apriyani Rahayu
2021	Huelva	(China) Chen Qingchen (China) Jia Yifan	(South Korea) Lee So-hee (South Korea) Shin Seung-chan	(Japan) Mayu Matsumoto (Japan) Wakana Nagahara
2021	Huelva	(China) Chen Qingchen (China) Jia Yifan	(South Korea) Lee So-hee (South Korea) Shin Seung-chan	(South Korea) Kim So-yeong (South Korea) Kong Hee-yong
2022	Tokyo	(China) Chen Qingchen (China) Jia Yifan	(South Korea) Kim So-yeong (South Korea) Kong Hee-yong	(Japan) Mayu Matsumoto (Japan) Wakana Nagahara
2022	Tokyo	(China) Chen Qingchen (China) Jia Yifan	(South Korea) Kim So-yeong (South Korea) Kong Hee-yong	(Thailand) Puttita Supajirakul (Thailand) Sapsiree Taerattanachai
2023	Copenhagen	(China) Chen Qingchen (China) Jia Yifan	(Indonesia) Apriyani Rahayu (Indonesia) Siti Fadia Silva Ramadhanti	(China) Zhang Shuxian (China) Zheng Yu
2023	Copenhagen	(China) Chen Qingchen (China) Jia Yifan	(Indonesia) Apriyani Rahayu (Indonesia) Siti Fadia Silva Ramadhanti	(South Korea) Kim So-yeong (South Korea) Kong Hee-yong
2025	Paris	(China) Liu Shengshu (China) Tan Ning	(Malaysia) Pearly Tan (Malaysia) Thinaah Muralitharan	(Japan) Rin Iwanaga (Japan) Kie Nakanishi
2025	Paris	(China) Liu Shengshu (China) Tan Ning	(Malaysia) Pearly Tan (Malaysia) Thinaah Muralitharan	(Japan) Nami Matsuyama (Japan) Chiharu Shida
2026	New Delhi	(South Korea) Baek Ha-na (South Korea) Lee So-hee	(China) Liu Shengshu (China) Tan Ning	(India) Treesa Jolly (India) Gayatri Gopichand
2026	New Delhi	(South Korea) Baek Ha-na (South Korea) Lee So-hee	(China) Liu Shengshu (China) Tan Ning	(China) Li Yijing (China) Luo Xumin

== Mixed doubles ==
Year	Host city	Gold	Silver	Bronze
1977	Malmö	(Denmark) Steen Skovgaard (Denmark) Lene Køppen	(England) Derek Talbot (England) Gillian Gilks	(England) Mike Tredgett (England) Nora Perry
1977	Malmö	(Denmark) Steen Skovgaard (Denmark) Lene Køppen	(England) Derek Talbot (England) Gillian Gilks	(Scotland) Billy Gilliland (Scotland) Joanne Flockhart
1980	Jakarta	(Indonesia) Christian Hadinata (Indonesia) Imelda Wiguna	(England) Mike Tredgett (England) Nora Perry	(Denmark) Steen Fladberg (Denmark) Pia Nielsen
1980	Jakarta	(Indonesia) Christian Hadinata (Indonesia) Imelda Wiguna	(England) Mike Tredgett (England) Nora Perry	(Denmark) Steen Skovgaard (Denmark) Lene Køppen
1983	Copenhagen	(Sweden) Thomas Kihlström (England) Nora Perry	(Denmark) Steen Fladberg (Denmark) Pia Nielsen	(China) Jiang Guoliang (China) Lin Ying
1983	Copenhagen	(Sweden) Thomas Kihlström (England) Nora Perry	(Denmark) Steen Fladberg (Denmark) Pia Nielsen	(England) Mike Tredgett (England) Karen Chapman
1985	Calgary	(South Korea) Park Joo-bong (South Korea) Yoo Sang-hee	(Sweden) Stefan Karlsson (Sweden) Maria Bengtsson	(China) Zhang Xinguang (China) Lao Yujing
1985	Calgary	(South Korea) Park Joo-bong (South Korea) Yoo Sang-hee	(Sweden) Stefan Karlsson (Sweden) Maria Bengtsson	(England) Nigel Tier (England) Gillian Gowers
1987	Beijing	(China) Wang Pengren (China) Shi Fangjing	(South Korea) Lee Deuk-choon (South Korea) Chung Myung-hee	(China) He Yiming (China) Yang Xinfang
1987	Beijing	(China) Wang Pengren (China) Shi Fangjing	(South Korea) Lee Deuk-choon (South Korea) Chung Myung-hee	(England) Martin Dew (England) Gillian Gilks
1989	Jakarta	(South Korea) Park Joo-bong (South Korea) Chung Myung-hee	(Indonesia) Eddy Hartono (Indonesia) Verawaty Fadjrin	(China) Wang Pengren (China) Shi Fangjing
1989	Jakarta	(South Korea) Park Joo-bong (South Korea) Chung Myung-hee	(Indonesia) Eddy Hartono (Indonesia) Verawaty Fadjrin	(China) Wu Chibing (China) Yang Xinfang
1991	Copenhagen	(South Korea) Park Joo-bong (South Korea) Chung Myung-hee	(Denmark) Thomas Lund (Denmark) Pernille Dupont	(Denmark) Jon Holst-Christensen (Denmark) Grete Mogensen
1991	Copenhagen	(South Korea) Park Joo-bong (South Korea) Chung Myung-hee	(Denmark) Thomas Lund (Denmark) Pernille Dupont	(South Korea) Kang Kyung-jin (South Korea) Shim Eun-jung
1993	Birmingham	(Denmark) Thomas Lund (Sweden) Catrine Bengtsson	(Denmark) Jon Holst-Christensen (Denmark) Grete Mogensen	(England) Nick Ponting (England) Gillian Clark
1993	Birmingham	(Denmark) Thomas Lund (Sweden) Catrine Bengtsson	(Denmark) Jon Holst-Christensen (Denmark) Grete Mogensen	(Indonesia) Aryono Miranat (Indonesia) Eliza Nathanael
1995	Lausanne	(Denmark) Thomas Lund (Denmark) Marlene Thomsen	(Denmark) Jens Eriksen (Denmark) Helene Kirkegaard	(China) Liu Jianjun (China) Ge Fei
1995	Lausanne	(Denmark) Thomas Lund (Denmark) Marlene Thomsen	(Denmark) Jens Eriksen (Denmark) Helene Kirkegaard	(Sweden) Jan-Eric Antonsson (Sweden) Astrid Crabo
1997	Glasgow	(China) Liu Yong (China) Ge Fei	(Denmark) Jens Eriksen (Denmark) Marlene Thomsen	(Denmark) Michael Søgaard (Denmark) Rikke Olsen
1997	Glasgow	(China) Liu Yong (China) Ge Fei	(Denmark) Jens Eriksen (Denmark) Marlene Thomsen	(Indonesia) Tri Kusharjanto (Indonesia) Minarti Timur
1999	Copenhagen	(South Korea) Kim Dong-moon (South Korea) Ra Kyung-min	(England) Simon Archer (England) Joanne Goode	(China) Liu Yong (China) Ge Fei
1999	Copenhagen	(South Korea) Kim Dong-moon (South Korea) Ra Kyung-min	(England) Simon Archer (England) Joanne Goode	(Denmark) Michael Søgaard (Denmark) Rikke Olsen
2001	Seville	(China) Zhang Jun (China) Gao Ling	(South Korea) Kim Dong-moon (South Korea) Ra Kyung-min	(Denmark) Jens Eriksen (Denmark) Mette Schjoldager
2001	Seville	(China) Zhang Jun (China) Gao Ling	(South Korea) Kim Dong-moon (South Korea) Ra Kyung-min	(Denmark) Michael Søgaard (Denmark) Rikke Olsen
2003	Birmingham	(South Korea) Kim Dong-moon (South Korea) Ra Kyung-min	(China) Zhang Jun (China) Gao Ling	(China) Chen Qiqiu (China) Zhao Tingting
2003	Birmingham	(South Korea) Kim Dong-moon (South Korea) Ra Kyung-min	(China) Zhang Jun (China) Gao Ling	(Denmark) Jonas Rasmussen (Denmark) Rikke Olsen
2005	Anaheim	(Indonesia) Nova Widianto (Indonesia) Liliyana Natsir	(China) Xie Zhongbo (China) Zhang Yawen	(New Zealand) Daniel Shirley (New Zealand) Sara Petersen
2005	Anaheim	(Indonesia) Nova Widianto (Indonesia) Liliyana Natsir	(China) Xie Zhongbo (China) Zhang Yawen	(Thailand) Sudket Prapakamol (Thailand) Saralee Thungthongkam
2006	Madrid	(England) Nathan Robertson (England) Gail Emms	(England) Anthony Clark (England) Donna Kellogg	(Malaysia) Koo Kien Keat (Malaysia) Wong Pei Tty
2006	Madrid	(England) Nathan Robertson (England) Gail Emms	(England) Anthony Clark (England) Donna Kellogg	(Thailand) Sudket Prapakamol (Thailand) Saralee Thungthongkam
2007	Kuala Lumpur	(Indonesia) Nova Widianto (Indonesia) Liliyana Natsir	(China) Zheng Bo (China) Gao Ling	(China) Xie Zhongbo (China) Zhang Yawen
2007	Kuala Lumpur	(Indonesia) Nova Widianto (Indonesia) Liliyana Natsir	(China) Zheng Bo (China) Gao Ling	(Indonesia) Flandy Limpele (Indonesia) Vita Marissa
2009	Hyderabad	(Denmark) Thomas Laybourn (Denmark) Kamilla Rytter Juhl	(Indonesia) Nova Widianto (Indonesia) Liliyana Natsir	(Denmark) Joachim Fischer Nielsen (Denmark) Christinna Pedersen
2009	Hyderabad	(Denmark) Thomas Laybourn (Denmark) Kamilla Rytter Juhl	(Indonesia) Nova Widianto (Indonesia) Liliyana Natsir	(South Korea) Lee Yong-dae (South Korea) Lee Hyo-jung
2010	Paris	(China) Zheng Bo (China) Ma Jin	(China) He Hanbin (China) Yu Yang	(South Korea) Ko Sung-hyun (South Korea) Ha Jung-eun
2010	Paris	(China) Zheng Bo (China) Ma Jin	(China) He Hanbin (China) Yu Yang	(Chinese Taipei) Lee Sheng-mu (Chinese Taipei) Chien Yu-chin
2011	London	(China) Zhang Nan (China) Zhao Yunlei	(England) Chris Adcock (Scotland) Imogen Bankier	(China) Xu Chen (China) Ma Jin
2011	London	(China) Zhang Nan (China) Zhao Yunlei	(England) Chris Adcock (Scotland) Imogen Bankier	(Indonesia) Tontowi Ahmad (Indonesia) Liliyana Natsir
2013	Guangzhou	(Indonesia) Tontowi Ahmad (Indonesia) Liliyana Natsir	(China) Xu Chen (China) Ma Jin	(China) Zhang Nan (China) Zhao Yunlei
2013	Guangzhou	(Indonesia) Tontowi Ahmad (Indonesia) Liliyana Natsir	(China) Xu Chen (China) Ma Jin	(South Korea) Shin Baek-cheol (South Korea) Eom Hye-won
2014	Copenhagen	(China) Zhang Nan (China) Zhao Yunlei	(China) Xu Chen (China) Ma Jin	(China) Liu Cheng (China) Bao Yixin
2014	Copenhagen	(China) Zhang Nan (China) Zhao Yunlei	(China) Xu Chen (China) Ma Jin	(Denmark) Joachim Fischer Nielsen (Denmark) Christinna Pedersen
2015	Jakarta	(China) Zhang Nan (China) Zhao Yunlei	(China) Liu Cheng (China) Bao Yixin	(China) Xu Chen (China) Ma Jin
2015	Jakarta	(China) Zhang Nan (China) Zhao Yunlei	(China) Liu Cheng (China) Bao Yixin	(Indonesia) Tontowi Ahmad (Indonesia) Liliyana Natsir
2017	Glasgow	(Indonesia) Tontowi Ahmad (Indonesia) Liliyana Natsir	(China) Zheng Siwei (China) Chen Qingchen	(England) Chris Adcock (England) Gabby Adcock
2017	Glasgow	(Indonesia) Tontowi Ahmad (Indonesia) Liliyana Natsir	(China) Zheng Siwei (China) Chen Qingchen	(Hong Kong) Lee Chun Hei (Hong Kong) Chau Hoi Wah
2018	Nanjing	(China) Zheng Siwei (China) Huang Yaqiong	(China) Wang Yilyu (China) Huang Dongping	(China) Zhang Nan (China) Li Yinhui
2018	Nanjing	(China) Zheng Siwei (China) Huang Yaqiong	(China) Wang Yilyu (China) Huang Dongping	(Hong Kong) Tang Chun Man (Hong Kong) Tse Ying Suet
2019	Basel	(China) Zheng Siwei (China) Huang Yaqiong	(Thailand) Dechapol Puavaranukroh (Thailand) Sapsiree Taerattanachai	(China) Wang Yilyu (China) Huang Dongping
2019	Basel	(China) Zheng Siwei (China) Huang Yaqiong	(Thailand) Dechapol Puavaranukroh (Thailand) Sapsiree Taerattanachai	(Japan) Yuta Watanabe (Japan) Arisa Higashino
2021	Huelva	(Thailand) Dechapol Puavaranukroh (Thailand) Sapsiree Taerattanachai	(Japan) Yuta Watanabe (Japan) Arisa Higashino	(Hong Kong) Tang Chun Man (Hong Kong) Tse Ying Suet
2021	Huelva	(Thailand) Dechapol Puavaranukroh (Thailand) Sapsiree Taerattanachai	(Japan) Yuta Watanabe (Japan) Arisa Higashino	(Japan) Kyohei Yamashita (Japan) Naru Shinoya
2022	Tokyo	(China) Zheng Siwei (China) Huang Yaqiong	(Japan) Yuta Watanabe (Japan) Arisa Higashino	(China) Wang Yilyu (China) Huang Dongping
2022	Tokyo	(China) Zheng Siwei (China) Huang Yaqiong	(Japan) Yuta Watanabe (Japan) Arisa Higashino	(Germany) Mark Lamsfuß (Germany) Isabel Lohau
2023	Copenhagen	(South Korea) Seo Seung-jae (South Korea) Chae Yu-jung	(China) Zheng Siwei (China) Huang Yaqiong	(China) Jiang Zhenbang (China) Wei Yaxin
2023	Copenhagen	(South Korea) Seo Seung-jae (South Korea) Chae Yu-jung	(China) Zheng Siwei (China) Huang Yaqiong	(Japan) Yuta Watanabe (Japan) Arisa Higashino
2025	Paris	(Malaysia) Chen Tang Jie (Malaysia) Toh Ee Wei	(China) Jiang Zhenbang (China) Wei Yaxin	(France) Thom Gicquel (France) Delphine Delrue
2025	Paris	(Malaysia) Chen Tang Jie (Malaysia) Toh Ee Wei	(China) Jiang Zhenbang (China) Wei Yaxin	(China) Guo Xinwa (China) Chen Fanghui
2026	New Delhi	(France) Thom Gicquel (France) Delphine Delrue	(China) Feng Yanzhe (China) Huang Dongping	(Indonesia) Amri Syahnawi (Indonesia) Nita Violina Marwah
2026	New Delhi	(France) Thom Gicquel (France) Delphine Delrue	(China) Feng Yanzhe (China) Huang Dongping	(China) Jiang Zhenbang (China) Wei Yaxin
