= 1983 IBF World Championships – Men's singles =

Badminton championships

Men's singles at the 1983 IBF World Championships
- Venue: Brøndbyhallen
- Location: Copenhagen, Denmark
- Dates: May 2, 1983 – May 8, 1983

Medalists
gold medal	Icuk Sugiarto	Indonesia
silver medal	Liem Swie King	Indonesia
bronze medal	Prakash Padukone	India
bronze medal	Han Jian	China

The 1983 IBF World Championships (World Badminton Championships) were held in Copenhagen, Denmark, in 1983. The gold medal was won by Icuk Sugiarto; the silver by Liem Swie King; and the bronze by Prakash Padukone and Han Jian. What follows are the detailed results of the men's singles.

== Main stage ==
=== Section 1 ===
First round
(Denmark) Morten Frost	15	15
(China) Yang Kesen	1	10
(India) Syed Modi	15	15
(Netherlands) Guus van der Vlugt	8	9
(Wales) Philip Sutton	15	15
(Norway) Tomm Eriksen	10	12
(New Zealand) Graeme Robson	18	15
(Sweden) Torbjörn Petersson	14	7
(Indonesia) Icuk Sugiarto	15	15
(South Korea) Sung Han-kook	12	9
(England) Nick Yates	15	18
(Thailand) Udom Luangpetcharaporn	5	14
(Canada) John Goss	15	10	15
(Germany) Rolf Rüsseler	8	15	11
(Germany) Thomas Künstler	10	15	15
(Japan) Koji Gondo	15	9	9

Second round
(Denmark) Morten Frost	15	15
(India) Syed Modi	2	4
(Wales) Philip Sutton	15	11
(New Zealand) Graeme Robson	11	15	6
(Indonesia) Icuk Sugiarto	15	15
(England) Nick Yates	12	2
(Canada) John Goss	15	15
(Germany) Thomas Künstler	7	8

Third round
(Denmark) Morten Frost	15	15
(Wales) Philip Sutton	8	7
(Indonesia) Icuk Sugiarto	15	15
(Canada) John Goss	5	0

Quarterfinals
(Denmark) Morten Frost	5	3
(Indonesia) Icuk Sugiarto	15	15

=== Section 2 ===
First round
(China) Luan Jin	15	15
(Netherlands) Rob Ridder	4	2
(Japan) Hiroyuki Hasegawa	15	15
(Germany) Uwe Scherpen	9	4
(Norway) Petter Thoresen	15	13	15
(South Korea) Kim Moon-soo	6	18	1
(Denmark) Michael Kjeldsen	15	15
(Malaysia) Ong Beng Teong	3	2
(India) Prakash Padukone	18	15
(Sweden) Stefan Karlsson	4	16
(Austria) Heinz Fischer	18	15
(Norway) Geir Dahl	14	7
(Australia) Paul Kong	3	15	15
(Scotland) Dan Travers	15	12	12
(England) Andy Goode	15	15
(Canada) Bob MacDougall	4	3

Second round
(China) Luan Jin	15	15
(Japan) Hiroyuki Hasegawa	2	4
(Norway) Petter Thoresen	3	13
(Denmark) Michael Kjeldsen	15	18
(India) Prakash Padukone	15	15
(Austria) Heinz Fischer	1	5
(Australia) Paul Kong	11	13
(England) Andy Goode	15	15

Third round
(China) Luan Jin	15	15
(Denmark) Michael Kjeldsen	11	9
(India) Prakash Padukone	15	15
(England) Andy Goode	5	8

Quarterfinals
(China) Luan Jin	3	9
(India) Prakash Padukone	15	15

=== Section 3 ===
First round
(China) Chen Changjie	15	15
(Netherlands) Uun Santosa	2	1
(Pakistan) Tariq Wadood	15	15
(Canada) Mike Butler	3	2
(England) Kevin Jolly	15	15
(Socialist Federal Republic of Yugoslavia) Gregor Berden	0	2
(Japan) Kinji Zeniya	15	15
(Switzerland) Pascal Kaul	2	2
(Indonesia) Liem Swie King	15	15
(Mexico) Roy Díaz González	3	4
(South Korea) Park Joo-bong	15	15
(Jamaica) Trevor Stewart	0	1
(Denmark) Steen Fladberg	15	15
(India) Pradeep Gandhe	4	4
(Sweden) Göran Carlsson	15	18
(Germany) Harald Klauer	11	15

Second round
(China) Chen Changjie	8	15	15
(Pakistan) Tariq Wadood	15	11	3
(England) Kevin Jolly	15	15
(Japan) Kinji Zeniya	11	5
(Indonesia) Liem Swie King	7	15	15
(South Korea) Park Joo-bong	15	4	12
(Denmark) Steen Fladberg	15	15
(Sweden) Göran Carlsson	9	6

Third round
(China) Chen Changjie	15	15
(England) Kevin Jolly	8	6
(Indonesia) Liem Swie King	15	15
(Denmark) Steen Fladberg	6	12

Quarterfinals
(China) Chen Changjie	15	5	4
(Indonesia) Liem Swie King	12	15	15

=== Section 4 ===
First round
(Denmark) Jens Peter Nierhoff	15	15
(Netherlands) Lex Coene	7	8
(Japan) Masao Tsuchida	w.o.
(United States) Chris Kinard
(Malaysia) Misbun Sidek	15	15
(Nigeria) Samson Egbeyemi	8	8
(England) Steve Baddeley	15	15
(India) Uday Pawar	2	9
(China) Han Jian	15	15
(Australia) Darren McDonald	5	1
(South Korea) Choi Byung-hak	15	15
(Austria) Klaus Fischer	2	5
(Hong Kong) Sze Yu	1	18	15
(Thailand) Sompol Kukasemkij	15	17	4
(Sweden) Ulf Johansson	15	15
(Wales) Chris Rees	11	10

Second round
(Denmark) Jens Peter Nierhoff	15	15
(Japan) Masao Tsuchida	8	5
(Malaysia) Misbun Sidek	15	12	15
(England) Steve Baddeley	6	15	6
(China) Han Jian	15	15
(South Korea) Choi Byung-hak	6	5
(Hong Kong) Sze Yu	w/o
(Sweden) Ulf Johansson	scr

Third round
(Denmark) Jens Peter Nierhoff	15	17
(Malaysia) Misbun Sidek	11	16
(China) Han Jian	15	15
(Sweden) Ulf Johansson	2	2

Quarterfinals
(Denmark) Jens Peter Nierhoff	15	4	4
(China) Han Jian	1	15	15

== Final stage ==
Quarterfinals
1	(Denmark) Morten Frost	5	3
8	(Indonesia) Icuk Sugiarto	15	15
4	(China) Luan Jin	3	9
5	(India) Prakash Padukone	15	15
3	(China) Chen Changjie	15	5	4
6	(Indonesia) Liem Swie King	12	15	15
2	(Denmark) Jens Peter Nierhoff	15	4	4
7	(China) Han Jian	12	15	15

Semifinals
(Indonesia) Icuk Sugiarto	9	15	15
(India) Prakash Padukone	15	7	1
(Indonesia) Liem Swie King	15	15
(China) Han Jian	9	3

Finals
(Indonesia) Icuk Sugiarto	15	12	17
(Indonesia) Liem Swie King	8	15	16
