= 1984 World Badminton Grand Prix Finals =

Tournament details
- Dates: 12–16 December
- Edition: 2
- Total prize money: US$70,000
- Location: Kuala Lumpur, Malaysia

The 1984 World Badminton Grand Prix was the second edition of the World Badminton Grand Prix finals. It was held in Kuala Lumpur, Malaysia, from December 12 to December 16, 1984.

== Results ==
=== Third place ===
Category	Winner	Runner-up	Score
Men's singles	(China) Han Jian	(Indonesia) Icuk Sugiarto	15–4, 15–6
Women's singles	(England) Helen Troke	(China) Li Lingwei	Walkover

=== Finals ===
Category	Winners	Runners-up	Score
Men's singles	(Denmark) Morten Frost	(Indonesia) Liem Swie King	15–5, 15–4
Women's singles	(China) Han Aiping	(Indonesia) Ivana Lie	11–3, 11–2
