= 1985 IBF World Championships – Men's singles =

Badminton championships

Men's singles at the 1985 IBF World Championships
- Venue: Olympic Saddledome
- Location: Calgary, Canada
- Dates: June 10, 1985 – June 16, 1985

Medalists
gold medal	Han Jian	China
silver medal	Morten Frost	Denmark
bronze medal	Jens Peter Nierhoff	Denmark
bronze medal	Yang Yang	China

The 1985 IBF World Championships (World Badminton Championships) were held in Calgary, Canada, from June 10 to June 16, 1985. Following the results of the men's singles. Men's top seed Zhao Jianhua of China withdrew from the tournament after suffering from pneumonia.

== Main stage ==
=== Section 1 ===
First Round
(China) Ding Qiqing	15	17
(Hong Kong) Chan Chi Choi	3	15
(Canada) Mike Butler	15	15
(Thailand) Sakrapee Thongsari	6	5
(Scotland) Dan Travers	15	15
(New Zealand) Chris Trapper	3	2
(Peru) Gustavo Salazar	2	6
(Mexico) Roy Díaz González	15	15
(Denmark) Jens Peter Nierhoff	15	15
(South Korea) Sung Han-kook	9	11
(West Germany) Rolf Rüsseler	10	5
(England) Darren Hall	15	15
(Sweden) Ulf Johansson	15	15
(Chinese Taipei) Gan Rong-Yih	2	11
(Japan) Hiroshi Nishiyami	11	9
(India) Sanat Misra	15	15

Second Round
(China) Ding	15	18
(Canada) Butler	13	14
(Scotland) Travers	15	15
(Mexico) González	7	2
(Denmark) Nierhoff	15	15
(England) Hall	9	4
(Sweden) Johansson	4	9
(India) Misra	15	15

Third Round
(China) Ding	15	15
(Scotland) Travers	7	2
(Denmark) Nierhoff	15	15
(India) Misra	6	5

Quarter Finals
(China) Ding	15	11	7
(Denmark) Nierhoff	11	15	15

=== Section 2 ===
First Round
(China) Han Jian	15	5	15
(Malaysia) Ong Beng Teong	3	15	10
(Japan) Shuuji Matsuno	10	15	13
(India) Syed Modi	15	7	15
(Sweden) Pär-Gunnar Jönsson	15	15
(Socialist Federal Republic of Yugoslavia) Gregor Berden	2	4
(Austria) Claus Fischer	7	3
(Indonesia) Hendry Saputra	15	15
(England) Nick Yates	15	15
(South Korea) Lee Deuk-choon	8	8
(Iceland) Broddi Kristjansson	17	15
(Nigeria) Samson Egbeyemi	14	1
(Canada) Peter Rawlek	12	10
(Denmark) Torben Carlsen	15	15
(United States) Chris Jogis	15	18
(West Germany) Uwe Scherpen	11	16

Second Round
(China) Han	15	15
(India) Modi	1	7
(Sweden) Jönsson	9	11
(Indonesia) Saputra	15	15
(England) Yates	15	15
(Iceland) Kristjansson	7	2
(Denmark) Carlsen	15	15
(United States) Jogis	12	11

Third Round
(China) Han	15	15
(Indonesia) Saputra	7	3
(England) Yates	15	7	12
(Denmark) Carlsen	13	15	15

Quarter Finals
(China) Han	15	15
(Denmark) Carlsen	10	2

=== Section 3 ===
First Round
(Austria) Heinz Fischer	15	18
(United States) Rodney Barton	12	16
(Indonesia) Icuk Sugiarto	15	15
(Japan) Hiroyuki Hasegawa	3	5
(Malaysia) Foo Kok Keong	11	15	12
(India) Vimal Kumar	15	7	8
(Chinese Taipei) Chang Wen-Sung	5	3
(England) Steve Baddeley	15	15
(Denmark) Ib Frederiksen	15	15
(Mexico) Ernesto de la Torre	0	3
(Thailand) Surachi Makkasasithorn	15	10	18
(Mexico) Fernando de la Torre	9	15	13
(Sweden) Jan-Eric Antonsson	15	6	15
(New Zealand) Graeme Robson	8	15	13
(South Korea) Choi Byung-hak	3	9
(China) Yang Yang	15	15

Second Round
(Austria) H. Fischer	0	5
(Indonesia) Sugiarto	15	15
(Malaysia) Foo K. K.	6	15
(England) Baddeley	15	15
(Denmark) Frederiksen	15	15
(Thailand) Makkasasithorn	6	4
(Sweden) Antonsson	11	7
(China) Yang	15	15

Third Round
(Indonesia) Sugiarto	15	15	15
(England) Baddeley	18	8	11
(Denmark) Frederiksen	18	10	11
(China) Yang	17	15	15

Quarter Finals
(Indonesia) Sugiarto	8	6
(China) Yang	15	15

=== Section 4 ===
First Round
(England) Steve Butler	15	4	15
(China) Yang Qiangli	11	15	13
(Canada) Claude Tremblay	5	3
(Thailand) Sompol Kukasemkij	15	15
(Nigeria) Benjamin Orakpo	9	10
(Nigeria) Clement Ogbo	15	15
(Austria) Tariq Farooq	7	3
(India) Prakash Padukone	15	15
(Scotland) Alex White	15	15
(United States) Kevin Hussey	2	10
(Peru) Federico Valdez	1	6
(South Korea) Park Sung-bae	15	15
(West Germany) Harald Klauer	13	16
(Canada) John Goss	15	17
(Japan) Shinji Matsuura	4	5
(Denmark) Morten Frost	15	15

Second Round
(England) Butler	7	11
(Thailand) Kukasemkij	15	15
(Nigeria) Ogbo	3	1
(India) Padukone	15	15
(Scotland) White	17	15
(South Korea) Park	15	2
(Canada) Goss	3	3
(Denmark) Frost	15	15

Third Round
(Thailand) Kukasemkij	12	12
(India) Padukone	15	15
(Scotland) White	3	3
(Denmark) Frost	15	15

Quarter Finals
(India) Padukone	4	6
(Denmark) Frost	15	15

== Finals ==
Quarterfinals
1	(China) Ding Qiqing	15	11	7
8	(Denmark) Jens Peter Nierhoff	11	15	15
4	(China) Han Jian	15	15
5	(Denmark) Torben Carlsen	10	2
3	(Indonesia) Icuk Sugiarto	6	8
6	(China) Yang Yang	15	15
2	(India) Prakash Padukone	4	6
7	(Denmark) Morten Frost	15	15

Semifinals
(Denmark) Jens Peter Nierhoff	9	14
(China) Han Jian	15	17
(China) Yang Yang	8	5
(Denmark) Morten Frost	15	15

Finals
(China) Han Jian	14	15	15
(Denmark) Morten Frost	18	10	8
