= 1980 Asian Invitational Badminton Championships =

Badminton championships

Tournament details
- Dates: 10 – 14 December
- Edition: 4
- Location: Bangkok, Thailand

The 1980 Asian Invitational Badminton Championships which was the fourth edition of Asian Invitational Championships took place in the month of December in Bangkok, Thailand.

== About ==
This tourney was hosted by Badminton Association of Thailand, which was the member of now defunct World Badminton Federation (WBF). A total of 12 countries participated, which were Sri Lanka, Singapore, China, Brunei, South Korea, Thailand, Bangladesh, Pakistan, Hong Kong, Burma, Philippines and Nepal. Due to orders from International Badminton Federation (IBF), Asian countries which were members of IBF like Malaysia, Japan, India & Indonesia declined the participation as IBF and WBF were rival organisations at that time period.

There was a controversy when Malaysian players Ho Khim Soon & Teh Kew San competed in this tournament, without prior permission from Badminton Association of Malaysia even when Malaysian team didn't opt to participate in this tournament. As a result, both the players along with Ng Mei Ling were banned for one month by Penang Badminton Association from competing in any tournament.

Tournament didn't feature Mixed doubles event. China was dominant all through in the competition, with Thailand having two of its doubles combinations in finals. At the end China registered a clean sweep by winning all four individual titles.

== Medalists ==
Discipline	Gold	Silver	Bronze
Men's singles	(China) Han Jian	(China) Chen Changjie	(China) Li Zhifeng
Men's singles	(China) Han Jian	(China) Chen Changjie	(China) Yang Kesen
Women's singles	(China) Song Youping	(China) Sang Yanqin	(China) Chen Ruizhen
Women's singles	(China) Song Youping	(China) Sang Yanqin	(China) Li Lingwei
Men's doubles	(China) Li Zhifeng & Yang Kesen	(Thailand) Bandid Jaiyen & Preecha Sopajaree	(Thailand) Sawei Chanseorasmee & Sarit Pisudchaikul
Men's doubles	(China) Li Zhifeng & Yang Kesen	(Thailand) Bandid Jaiyen & Preecha Sopajaree	(China) Chen Changjie & Wang Yueping
Women's doubles	(China) Li Lingwei & Sang Yanqin	(Thailand) Jutatip Banjongsilp & Suleeporn Jittariyakul	(China) Chen Ruizhen & Song Youping
Women's doubles	(China) Li Lingwei & Sang Yanqin	(Thailand) Jutatip Banjongsilp & Suleeporn Jittariyakul	(Thailand) Phanwad Jinasuyanont & Kanitta Mansamuth

== Semifinal results ==
Discipline	Winner	Runner-up	Score
Men's singles	(China) Han Jian	(China) Yang Kesen	15–12, 15–8
Men's singles	(China) Chen Changjie	(China) Li Zhifeng	15–11, 15–7
Women's singles	(China) Sang Yanqin	(China) Chen Ruizhen	6–11, 11–7, 11–7
Women's singles	(China) Song Youping	(China) Li Lingwei	12–9, 11–6
Men's doubles	(Thailand) Bandid Jaiyen & Preecha Sopajaree	(China) Chen Changjie & Wang Yueping	15–1, 15–9
Men's doubles	(China) Li Zhifeng & Yang Kesen	(Thailand) Sawei Chanseorasmee & Sarit Pisudchaikul	17–15, 15–2
Women's doubles	(Thailand) Jutatip Banjongsilp & Suleeporn Jittariyakul	(China) Chen Ruizhen & Song Youping	17–14, 15–7
Women's doubles	(China) Li Lingwei & Sang Yanqin	(Thailand) Phanwad Jinasuyanont & Kanitta Mansamuth	15–8, 15–5

== Final results ==
Discipline	Winner	Finalist	Score
Men's singles	(China) Han Jian	(China) Chen Changjie	15–11, 15–8
Women's singles	(China) Song Youping	(China) Sang Yanqin	11–6, 11–8
Men's doubles	(China) Li Zhifeng & Yang Kesen	(Thailand) Bandid Jaiyen & Preecha Sopajaree	15–10, 15–6
Women's doubles	(China) Li Lingwei & Sang Yanqin	(Thailand) Jutatip Banjongsilp & Suleeporn Jittariyakul	15–10, 15–6
