= 1982 Badminton World Cup =

Badminton championships

Tournament details
- Dates: 15–19 September 1982
- Edition: 4th
- Venue: Stadium Negara
- Location: Kuala Lumpur, Malaysia

The 1982 Badminton World Cup was the fourth edition of an international tournament Badminton World Cup. The event was held in Kuala Lumpur, Malaysia from 15 September to 19 September 1982. Competitions for doubles were not conducted. Indonesia won men's singles event while Denmark won women's singles event.

== Medalists ==
Event	Gold	Silver	Bronze
Men's singles	(Indonesia) Liem Swie King	(Malaysia) Misbun Sidek	(China) Han Jian
Women's singles	(Denmark) Lene Køppen	(Indonesia) Verawaty Fajrin	(China) Zheng Yuli

== Men's singles ==
Semifinal
(Malaysia) Misbun Sidek	7	15	15
(India) Prakash Padukone	15	5	9
(Indonesia) Liem Swie King	18	15
(China) Han Jian	14	11

Final
(Malaysia) Misbun Sidek	12	15	12
(Indonesia) Liem Swie King	15	3	15
Third place
(India) Prakash Padukone	5	5
(China) Han Jian	15	15

== Women's singles ==
Semifinal
(Indonesia) Verawaty Fajrin	9	12	11
(China) Zheng Yuli	12	10	8
(China) Song Youping	12	10	4
(Denmark) Lene Køppen	11	12	11

Final
(Indonesia) Verawaty Fajrin	2	10
(Denmark) Lene Køppen	11	12
Third place
(China) Zheng Yuli	11	5	11
(China) Song Youping	6	11	7
