= Jens Peter Nierhoff =

Danish badminton player (born 1960)

Personal information
- Born: 2 September 1960 (age 66) Kolding, Denmark
- Height: 1.88 m (6 ft 2 in)

Sport
- Country: Denmark
- Sport: Badminton
- BWF profile
Medal record
Men's badminton
Representing Denmark
World Championships
Bronze medal – third place	1985 Calgary	Men's singles
Bronze medal – third place	1987 Beijing	Men's doubles
World Cup
Bronze medal – third place	1983 Kuala Lumpur	Men's doubles
Bronze medal – third place	1988 Bangkok	Men's doubles
Sudirman Cup
Bronze medal – third place	1989 Jakarta	Mixed team
Thomas Cup
Bronze medal – third place	1990 Nagoya & Tokyo	Men's team
European Championships
Gold medal – first place	1982 Böblingen	Men's singles
Gold medal – first place	1988 Kristiansand	Men's doubles
Silver medal – second place	1984 Preston	Men's singles
Silver medal – second place	1984 Preston	Men's doubles
European Mixed Team Championships
Gold medal – first place	1988 Kristiansand	Mixed team
Silver medal – second place	1984 Preston	Mixed team
Bronze medal – third place	1982 Böblingen	Mixed team
European Junior Championships
Gold medal – first place	1979 Mülheim an der Ruhr	Boys' singles
Gold medal – first place	1979 Mülheim an der Ruhr	Mixed doubles
Gold medal – first place	1979 Mülheim an der Ruhr	Mixed team

Jens Peter Nierhoff (born 2 September 1960) is a Danish retired badminton player, noted for his powerful smash, who won a number of international titles in singles and men's doubles during the 1980s.

== Career ==
Nierhoff won men's singles at the 1982 European Championships, and men's doubles at the 1988 European Championships with Michael Kjeldsen. He competed at the 1983 IBF World Championships in men's singles and lost to Han Jian in the quarter-finals. Two years later he won the bronze medal at the 1985 IBF World Championships, losing to Han Jian] again, this time in the semi-finals. Nierhoff's accomplishments included singles victories at the Dutch (1984, 1988), Swedish (1984) Canadian (1985), and Scottish (1987) Opens; and doubles titles at the Swiss (1981), Dutch (1988), Canadian (1985, 1988), and Scottish (1987) Opens.

== Achievements ==
=== World Championships ===
Men's singles
Year	Venue	Opponent	Score	Result
1985	Olympic Saddledome, Calgary, Canada	(China) Han Jian	9–15, 14–17	Bronze

Men's doubles
Year	Venue	Partner	Opponent	Score	Result
1987	Capital Indoor Stadium, Beijing, China	(Denmark) Michael Kjeldsen	(China) Li Yongbo (China) Tian Bingyi	4–15, 4–15	Bronze

=== World Cup ===
Men's doubles
Year	Venue	Partner	Opponent	Score	Result
1983	Stadium Negara, Kuala Lumpur, Malaysia	(Denmark) Morten Frost	(Indonesia) Bobby Ertanto (Indonesia) Christian Hadinata	11–15, 15–4, 13–15	Bronze
1988	National Stadium, Bangkok, Thailand	(Denmark) Michael Kjeldsen	(Malaysia) Jalani Sidek (Malaysia) Razif Sidek	6–15, 7–15	Bronze

=== European Championships ===
Men's singles
Year	Venue	Opponent	Score	Result
1982	Sporthalle, Böblingen, West Germany	(England) Ray Stevens	15–9, 15–4	Gold
1984	Guild Hall, Preston, England	(Denmark) Morten Frost	8–15, 2–15	Silver

Men's doubles
Year	Venue	Partner	Opponent	Score	Result
1984	Guild Hall, Preston, England	(Denmark) Morten Frost	(England) Martin Dew (England) Mike Tredgett	8–15, 10–15	Silver
1988	Badmintonsenteret, Kristiansand, Norway	(Denmark) Michael Kjeldsen	(Denmark) Steen Fladberg (Denmark) Jan Paulsen	15–9, 15–11	Gold

=== European Junior Championships ===
Boys' singles
Year	Venue	Opponent	Score	Result
1979	Carl Diem Halle; Mülheim an der Ruhr, West Germany	(England) Nick Yates	17–16, 15–1	Gold

Mixed doubles
Year	Venue	Partner	Opponent	Score	Result
1979	Carl Diem Halle; Mülheim an der Ruhr, West Germany	(Denmark) Charlotte Pilgaard	(Sweden) Peter Isaksson (Sweden) Lena Axelsson	15–7, 15–7	Gold

=== IBF World Grand Prix ===
The World Badminton Grand Prix sanctioned by International Badminton Federation (IBF) from 1983 to 2006.

Men's singles
Year	Tournament	Opponent	Score	Result
1983	Canadian Open	(Malaysia) Misbun Sidek	6–15, 15–11, 12–15	(silver) Runner-up
1984	Dutch Open	(Denmark) Ib Frederiksen	12–15, 15–9, 18–16	(gold) Winner
1984	Denmark Open	(Denmark) Morten Frost	1–15, 2–15	(silver) Runner-up
1984	Swedish Open	(Australia) Sze Yu	15–3, 10–15, 15–12	(gold) Winner
1985	Canadian Open	(Denmark) Ib Frederiksen	15–6, 15–2	(gold) Winner
1987	Poona Open	(Denmark) Morten Frost	11–15, 11–15	(silver) Runner-up
1987	Scottish Open	(Denmark) Michael Kjeldsen	11–15, 15–9, 15–4	(gold) Winner
1988	Dutch Open	(Indonesia) Icuk Sugiarto	15–11, 9–15, 15–4	(gold) Winner
1989	Scottish Open	(Denmark) Morten Frost	2–15, 5–15	(silver) Runner-up
1990	German Open	(Indonesia) Fung Permadi	Walkover	(silver) Runner-up

Men's doubles
Year	Tournament	Partner	Opponent	Score	Result
1984	Denmark Open	(Denmark) Morten Frost	(China) Li Yongbo (China) Tian Bingyi	7–15, 2–15	(silver) Runner-up
1985	Canadian Open	(Denmark) Henrik Svarrer	(Scotland) Billy Gilliland (Scotland) Dan Travers	15–12, 15–11	(gold) Winner
1987	Poona Open	(Denmark) Michael Kjeldsen	(Denmark) Peter Buch (Denmark) Nils Skeby	15–3, 17–15	(gold) Winner
1987	Scandinavian Open	(Denmark) Michael Kjeldsen	(China) Li Yongbo (China) Tian Bingyi	2–15, 11–15	(silver) Runner-up
1987	Scottish Open	(Denmark) Michael Kjeldsen	(Wales) Chris Rees (Wales) Lyndon Williams	15–4, 15–4	(gold) Winner
1988	Poona Open	(Denmark) Michael Kjeldsen	(Malaysia) Cheah Soon Kit (Malaysia) Ong Beng Teong	15–10, 10–15, 15–6	(gold) Winner
1988	Dutch Open	(Denmark) Michael Kjeldsen	(Indonesia) Rudy Gunawan (Indonesia) Eddy Hartono	15–12, 7–15, 15–4	(gold) Winner
1988	Canadian Open	(Denmark) Henrik Svarrer	(China) Yang Kesen (China) Zheng Shoutai	15–9, 15–4	(gold) Winner

=== IBF International ===
Men's singles

Year	Tournament	Partner	Score	Result
1979	Czechoslovakian International	(Denmark) Steen Fladberg	9–15, 2–15	(silver) Runner-up
1982	German Open	(Denmark) Morten Frost	12–15, 15–13, 8–15	(silver) Runner-up
1982	Nordic Championships	(Denmark) Morten Frost	2–15, 6–15	(silver) Runner-up
1983	English Masters	(Indonesia) Icuk Sugiarto	15–7, 15–12	(gold) Winner
1984	Nordic Championships	(Denmark) Morten Frost	14–17, 6–15	(silver) Runner-up
1984	Scottish Open	(China) Zhao Jianhua	5–15, 7–15	(silver) Runner-up
1985	Intersport-Cup	(Germany) Jürgen Gebhardt	15–4, 15–3	(gold) Winner

Men's doubles
Year	Tournament	Partner	Opponent	Score	Result
1979	Czechoslovakian International	(Denmark) Steen Fladberg	(Denmark) Kenneth Larsen (Denmark) Mogens Neergaard	15–11, 15–11	(gold) Winner
1980	German Open	(Denmark) Steen Skovgaard	(Denmark) Kenneth Larsen (Denmark) Mogens Neergaard	15–7, 15–5	(gold) Winner
1980	Czechoslovakian International	(Denmark) Jan Hammergaard Hansen	(England) Gerry Asquith (England) Duncan Bridge	18–14, 15–8	(gold) Winner
1981	Swiss Open	(Denmark) Kenn H. Nielsen	(Denmark) Torben Christensen (Denmark) Mogens Neergaard	15–11, 15–6	(gold) Winner
1982	Indonesia Open	(Indonesia) Christian Hadinata	(Indonesia) Rudy Heryanto (Indonesia) Hariamanto Kartono	1–15, 15–10, 2–15	(silver) Runner-up
1983	Nordic Championships	(Denmark) Morten Frost	(Sweden) Stefan Karlsson (Sweden) Thomas Kihlström	12–15, 15–17	(silver) Runner-up
1983	India Masters	(Denmark) Jesper Helledie	(England) Steve Baddeley (England) Martin Dew	7–15, 15–6, 15–14	(gold) Winner
1984	English Masters	(Denmark) Morten Frost	(Indonesia) Hadibowo (Indonesia) Christian Hadinata	3–15, 3–15	(silver) Runner-up
1984	Scottish Open	(Denmark) Morten Frost	(England) Andy Goode (England) Nigel Tier	12–15, 15–8, 9–15	(silver) Runner-up
1988	Nordic Championships	(Denmark) Michael Kjeldsen	(Sweden) Jan-Eric Antonsson (Sweden) Stellan Österberg	15–0, 15–10	(gold) Winner
