= 1981 Badminton World Cup =

Badminton championships

Tournament details
- Dates: 7–11 October 1981
- Edition: 3rd
- Total prize money: US$118,000
- Venue: Stadium Negara
- Location: Kuala Lumpur, Malaysia

The 1981 Badminton World Cup was the third edition of an international tournament Badminton World Cup. The event was held in Kuala Lumpur, Malaysia from 7 October to 11 October 1981. Competitions for doubles were not conducted. India won men's singles event while China won women's singles event.

== Medalists ==
Event	Gold	Silver	Bronze
Men's singles	(India) Prakash Padukone	(China) Han Jian	(China) Chen Changjie
Women's singles	(China) Chen Ruizhen	(China) Li Lingwei	(Indonesia) Ivana Lie

== Men's singles ==
Semifinal
(India) Prakash Padukone	15	15
(China) Chen Changjie	6	8
(Indonesia) Hadiyanto	15	15	5
(China) Han Jian	17	13	15

Final
(India) Prakash Padukone	15	18
(China) Han Jian	0	16
Third place
(China) Chen Changjie	15	15
(Indonesia) Hadiyanto	12	10

== Women's singles ==
Semifinal
(China) Chen Ruizhen	11	11
(Indonesia) Ivana Lie	5	5
(Canada) Wendy Carter	3	6
(China) Li Lingwei	11	11

Final
(China) Chen Ruizhen	12	2	11
(China) Li Lingwei	10	11	7
Third place
(Indonesia) Ivana Lie	11	11
(Canada) Wendy Carter	0	8
