= Chen Changjie (badminton) =

Chinese badminton player (born 1959)

Chen Changjie 陈昌杰
Personal information
- Born: 4 January 1959 (age 67) Dalian, Liaoning, China

Sport
- Country: China
- Sport: Badminton
- Handedness: Right
- Event: Men's singles
Medal record
Men's badminton
Representing China
World Games
Gold medal – first place	1981 Santa Clara	Men's singles
World Cup
Bronze medal – third place	1981 Kuala Lumpur	Men's singles
Thomas Cup
Gold medal – first place	1982 London	Men's team
Asian Games
Gold medal – first place	1982 New Delhi	Men's team
Bronze medal – third place	1982 New Delhi	Men's singles
Asian Championships
Gold medal – first place	1983 Calcutta	Men's singles
Gold medal – first place	1983 Calcutta	Men's team

Chen Changjie (Chinese: 陈昌杰); is a retired professional badminton player from China.

== Career ==
Chen rated among the world's leading singles players when China entered the International Badminton Federation (now Badminton World Federation) in 1981. The powerful Changjie won the first major IBF sanctioned tournament in which China participated, the multi-sport 1981 World Games in Santa Clara, California, by successively beating Prakash Padukone and Morten Frost in the semifinal and final rounds. He helped China to win the 1982 Thomas Cup (world men's team championship) by winning three of his four matches in the last two rounds against Denmark and Indonesia. In 1983 Changjie won the Asian Championships in a grueling duel with Indonesia's Eddy Kurniawan The following year Changjie married Zhang Ailing, a brilliant player on the Chinese women's team, and neither appeared in international competition after 1984.

== Achievements ==
=== World Cup ===
Men's singles
Year	Venue	Opponent	Score	Result
1981	Stadium Negara, Kuala Lumpur, Malaysia	(Indonesia) Hadiyanto	15–12, 15–10	Bronze

=== World Games ===
Men's singles
Year	Venue	Opponent	Score	Result
1981	San Jose Civic Auditorium, California, United States	(Denmark) Morten Frost	9–15, 15–7, 15–12	Gold

=== Asian Games ===
Men's singles
Year	Venue	Opponent	Score	Result
1982	Indraprastha Indoor Stadium; New Delhi, India	(Indonesia) Liem Swie King	4–15, 6–15	Bronze

=== Asian Championships ===
Men's singles
Year	Venue	Opponent	Score	Result
1983	Shanghai, China	(Indonesia) Eddy Kurniawan	11–15, 15–6, 18–15	Gold
