= Icuk Sugiarto =

Indonesian badminton player (born 1962)

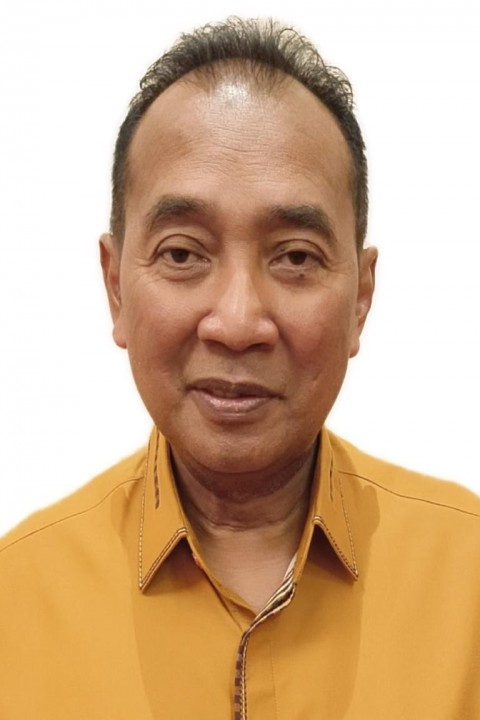

Personal information
- Born: 4 October 1962 (age 64) Surakarta, Central Java, Indonesia
- Height: 1.73 m (5 ft 8 in)
- Weight: 70 kg (154 lb)

Sport
- Country: Indonesia
- Sport: Badminton
- Handedness: Right
- Event: Men's singles
Medal record
Men's badminton
Representing Indonesia
World Championships
Gold medal – first place	1983 Copenhagen	Men's singles
Bronze medal – third place	1987 Beijing	Men's singles
Bronze medal – third place	1989 Jakarta	Men's singles
World Cup
Gold medal – first place	1985 Jakarta	Men's singles
Gold medal – first place	1986 Jakarta	Men's singles
Bronze medal – third place	1983 Kuala Lumpur	Men's singles
Sudirman Cup
Gold medal – first place	1989 Jakarta	Mixed team
Thomas Cup
Gold medal – first place	1984 Kuala Lumpur	Men's team
Silver medal – second place	1986 Jakarta	Men's team
Bronze medal – third place	1988 Kuala Lumpur	Men's team
Bronze medal – third place	1990 Tokyo	Men's team
Asian Games
Gold medal – first place	1982 New Delhi	Men's doubles
Silver medal – second place	1982 New Delhi	Mixed doubles
Silver medal – second place	1982 New Delhi	Men's team
Bronze medal – third place	1986 Seoul	Men's team
Asian Championships
Silver medal – second place	1989 Shanghai	Men's team
Bronze medal – third place	1985 Kuala Lumpur	Men's team
SEA Games
Gold medal – first place	1981 Manila	Men's team
Gold medal – first place	1983 Singapore	Men's team
Gold medal – first place	1985 Bangkok	Men's singles
Gold medal – first place	1985 Bangkok	Men's team
Gold medal – first place	1987 Jakarta	Men's singles
Gold medal – first place	1987 Jakarta	Men's team
Gold medal – first place	1989 Kuala Lumpur	Men's singles
Silver medal – second place	1989 Kuala Lumpur	Men's team
Southeast Asian Junior Championships
Gold medal – first place	1979 Jakarta	Boys' singles
Gold medal – first place	1979 Jakarta	Boys' doubles
Gold medal – first place	1979 Jakarta	Boys' team
Gold medal – first place	1980 Kuala Lumpur	Boys' singles
Gold medal – first place	1980 Kuala Lumpur	Boys' doubles
Gold medal – first place	1980 Kuala Lumpur	Boys' team
- Political party: United Development Party

Icuk Sugiarto (born 4 October 1962) is an Indonesian former champion badminton player.

== Career ==
Largely a speed and power player, Sugiarto won the gold medal at the 1983 IBF World Championships, upsetting fellow countryman Liem Swie King in the final, and the bronze medal at the 1987 and 1989 IBF World Championships. He captured singles titles at the Indonesia (1982, 1986, 1988), Malaysia (1984), Thailand (1984, 1985), French (1988), and Hong Kong (1988) Opens; at the Badminton World Cup (1985, 1986); and at the SEA Games (three consecutive times) in 1985, 1987, and 1989. At nineteen, he shared the 1982 Asian Games men's doubles title with doubles maestro Christian Hadinata. Sugiarto was a member of Indonesia's world champion Thomas Cup (men's international) team of 1984.

Sugiarto is known for his rally game, with lobs and dropshots, relying on his physical fitness and defensive game.

== Personal life ==
Sugiarto married Nina Yaroh in 1983. They have three children — Natassia Octaviani (1984), Tommy (1988), and Jauza (1999). Tommy and Jauza are also badminton players. Jauza won doubles medals at the junior level; Tommy is an elite men's singles player.

== Achievements ==
=== Olympic Games (exhibition) ===
Men's singles
Year	Venue	Opponent	Score	Result	Ref.
1988	Seoul National University Gymnasium, Seoul, South Korea	(China) Yang Yang	4–15, 10–15	Silver	

=== World Championships ===
Men's singles
Year	Venue	Opponent	Score	Result	Ref.
1983	Brøndbyhallen, Copenhagen, Denmark	(Indonesia) Liem Swie King	15–8, 12–15, 17–16	Gold	
1987	Capital Indoor Stadium, Beijing, China	(China) Yang Yang	11–15, 5–15	Bronze	
1989	Istora Senayan, Jakarta, Indonesia	(China) Yang Yang	15–13, 7–15, 9–15	Bronze	

=== World Cup ===
Men's singles
Year	Venue	Opponent	Score	Result	Ref.
1983	Stadium Negara, Kuala Lumpur, Malaysia	(China) Han Jian	6–15, 5–15	Bronze	
1985	Istora Senayan, Jakarta, Indonesia	(Denmark) Morten Frost	15–11, 8–15, 15–4	Gold	
1986	Istora Senayan, Jakarta, Indonesia	(Denmark) Morten Frost	5–15, 15–6, 15–11	Gold	

=== Asian Games ===
Men's doubles
Year	Venue	Partner	Opponent	Score	Result	Ref.
1982	Indraprastha Indoor Stadium, New Delhi, India	(Indonesia) Christian Hadinata	(China) Lin Jiangli (China) Luan Jin	15–6, 15–8	Gold	

Mixed doubles
Year	Venue	Partner	Opponent	Score	Result	Ref.
1982	Indraprastha Indoor Stadium, New Delhi, India	(Indonesia) Ruth Damayanti	(Indonesia) Christian Hadinata (Indonesia) Ivana Lie	15–3, 8–15, 10–15	Silver	

=== SEA Games ===
Men's singles
Year	Venue	Opponent	Score	Result	Ref.
1985	Chulalongkorn University Indoor Stadium, Bangkok, Thailand	(Indonesia) Eddy Kurniawan	15–9, 15–6	Gold	
1987	Kuningan Hall, Jakarta, Indonesia	(Indonesia) Eddy Kurniawan	15–13, 0–15, 15–9	Gold	
1989	Stadium Negara, Kuala Lumpur, Malaysia	(Indonesia) Eddy Kurniawan	15–7, 15–10	Gold	

=== IBF World Grand Prix (9 titles, 5 runners-up) ===
The World Badminton Grand Prix has been sanctioned by the International Badminton Federation from 1983 to 2006.

Men's singles
Year	Tournament	Opponent	Score	Result	Ref.
1984	Thailand Open	(India) Prakash Padukone	13–15, 15–5, 15–4	(gold) Winner	
1984	Malaysia Open	(Denmark) Morten Frost	15–9, 15–4	(gold) Winner	
1985	Thailand Open	(China) Xiong Guobao	15–6, 15–3	(gold) Winner	
1986	China Open	(Malaysia) Misbun Sidek	15–13, 15–11	(gold) Winner	
1986	Indonesia Open	(Australia) Sze Yu	15–6, 15–6	(gold) Winner	
1986	Hong Kong Open	(China) Yang Yang	15–6, 8–15, 6–15	(silver) Runner-up	
1986	Chinese Taipei Open	(Australia) Sze Yu	15–4, 14–17, 5–15	(silver) Runner-up	
1987	All England Open	(Denmark) Morten Frost	10–15, 0–15	(silver) Runner-up	
1987	Scandinavian Open	(China) Yang Yang	Walkover	(silver) Runner-up	
1988	Indonesia Open	(Indonesia) Lius Pongoh	15–6, 15–4	(gold) Winner	
1988	Chinese Taipei Open	(Indonesia) Lius Pongoh	15–8, 15–11	(gold) Winner	
1988	French Open	(Denmark) Morten Frost	15–10, 6–15, 15–2	(gold) Winner	
1988	Hong Kong Open	(China) Yang Yang	7–15, 15–1, 15–11	(gold) Winner	
1988	Dutch Open	(Denmark) Jens Peter Nierhoff	11–15, 15–9, 4–15	(silver) Runner-up	

BWF Grand Prix tournament

=== International tournaments (3 titles, 4 runners-up) ===
Men's singles
Year	Tournament	Opponent	Score	Result	Ref.
1981	Chinese Taipei Open	(England) Kevin Jolly	15–8, 7–15, 0–1 retired	(silver) Runner-up	
1982	India Open	(Indonesia) Lius Pongoh	12–15, 5–15	(silver) Runner-up	
1982	Indonesia Open	(Indonesia) Lius Pongoh	15–9, 15–8	(gold) Winner	
1982	Swedish Open	(Malaysia) Misbun Sidek	15–9, 14–18, 13–15	(silver) Runner-up	
1983	Chinese Taipei Open	(India) Prakash Padukone	15–10, 15–8	(gold) Winner	
1983	English Masters	(Denmark) Jens Peter Nierhoff	7–15, 12–15	(silver) Runner-up	
1983	Holland Masters	(Indonesia) Hastomo Arbi	15–11, 15–6	(gold) Winner	
