= 1983 IBF World Championships =

Tournament details
- Dates: 2 May – 8 May
- Edition: 3rd
- Level: International
- Venue: Brøndbyhallen
- Location: Copenhagen, Denmark

The 1983 IBF World Championships (World Badminton Championships) were held in 1983 in Copenhagen, Denmark.

== Medalists ==
=== Medal table ===
* Host nation (Denmark)

Rank	Nation	Gold	Silver	Bronze	Total
1	China	2	1	4	7
2	Indonesia	1	1	1	3
3	Denmark*	1	1	0	2
4	England	0.5	2	3	5.5
5	Sweden	0.5	0	0	0.5
6	India	0	0	1	1
6	South Korea	0	0	1	1
Totals (7 entries)		5	5	10	20

=== Events ===
Event	Gold	Silver	Bronze
Men's singles	(Indonesia) Icuk Sugiarto	(Indonesia) Liem Swie King	(India) Prakash Padukone
Men's singles	(Indonesia) Icuk Sugiarto	(Indonesia) Liem Swie King	(China) Han Jian
Women's singles	(China) Li Lingwei	(China) Han Aiping	(England) Helen Troke
Women's singles	(China) Li Lingwei	(China) Han Aiping	(China) Zhang Ailing
Men's doubles	(Denmark) Steen Fladberg (Denmark) Jesper Helledie	(England) Mike Tredgett (England) Martin Dew	(South Korea) Park Joo-bong (South Korea) Lee Eun-ku
Men's doubles	(Denmark) Steen Fladberg (Denmark) Jesper Helledie	(England) Mike Tredgett (England) Martin Dew	(Indonesia) Christian Hadinata (Indonesia) Bobby Ertanto
Women's doubles	(China) Lin Ying (China) Wu Dixi	(England) Nora Perry (England) Jane Webster	(China) Wu Jianqiu (China) Xu Rong
Women's doubles	(China) Lin Ying (China) Wu Dixi	(England) Nora Perry (England) Jane Webster	(England) Gillian Clark (England) Gillian Gilks
Mixed doubles	(Sweden) Thomas Kihlström (England) Nora Perry	(Denmark) Steen Fladberg (Denmark) Pia Nielsen	(England) Mike Tredgett (England) Karen Chapman
Mixed doubles	(Sweden) Thomas Kihlström (England) Nora Perry	(Denmark) Steen Fladberg (Denmark) Pia Nielsen	(China) Jiang Guoliang (China) Lin Ying
