= Morten Frost =

Danish badminton player

Personal information
- Nickname: Mr Badminton
- Born: Morten Frost Hansen; 4 April 1958 (age 68) Nykøbing Sjælland, Odsherred, Denmark.

Sport
- Country: Denmark
- Sport: Badminton
- Handedness: Right

Men's singles
- Highest ranking: 1
Medal record
Men's badminton
Representing Denmark
World Championships
Silver medal – second place	1985 Calgary	Men's singles
Silver medal – second place	1987 Beijing	Men's singles
World Games
Silver medal – second place	1981 Santa Clara	Men's singles
World Cup
Silver medal – second place	1985 Jakarta	Men's singles
Silver medal – second place	1986 Jakarta	Men's singles
Bronze medal – third place	1983 Kuala Lumpur	Men's doubles
Sudirman Cup
Bronze medal – third place	1989 Jakarta	Mixed team
Thomas Cup
Silver medal – second place	1979 Jakarta	Men's team
Bronze medal – third place	1990 Tokyo	Men's team
European Championships
Gold medal – first place	1984 Preston	Men's singles
Gold medal – first place	1986 Uppsala	Men's singles
Silver medal – second place	1980 Groningen	Men's singles
Silver medal – second place	1984 Preston	Men's doubles
Silver medal – second place	1988 Kristiansand	Men's singles
European Mixed Team Championships
Gold medal – first place	1980 Groningen	Mixed team
Gold medal – first place	1986 Uppsala	Mixed team
Gold medal – first place	1988 Kristiansand	Mixed team
Gold medal – first place	1990 Moscow	Mixed team
Silver medal – second place	1984 Preston	Mixed team
European Junior Championships
Gold medal – first place	1975 Copenhagen	Mixed team
Silver medal – second place	1975 Copenhagen	Boys' singles

Morten Frost Hansen (born 4 April 1958) is a badminton player and later coach, who represented Denmark. As a player, he spent twelve years in the top three of the world rankings. After his retirement in 1991, he became director of performance for Badminton Denmark and also coaches in Malaysia and South Africa. He has been appointed Badminton Association of Malaysia's national technical director from 2015 to 2020, and later as the performance director of Badminton England.

== Badminton career ==
Danish player Morten Frost achieved significant international success in badminton but notably never won the World Championships, securing silver medals in 1985 and 1987. Despite this gap in his record, he won multiple All England Open, European, and Nordic titles.

Frost is also distinguished by winning all of the invitational Grand Prix tournaments at least once, including his home country's Denmark Open, of which he was champion 1980–1986 and 1989. Morten Frost represented Denmark on the national team from 1976 to 1991, longer than anyone else.

Noted for his exceptionally smooth and fluid footwork, Frost's playing style was something of a cross between the traditional singles game featuring numerous clears (lobs) and drops, with smashes often reserved for weak returns, and the modern singles game featuring more smashing from the outset of a rally to create openings.

Morten Frost was inducted into the BWF Badminton Hall of Fame in 1998.

=== Coaching career ===
After his playing years were over, he went on to successfully coach the Danish national team. During his tenure as coach, the Danish national squad achieved over 20 major international wins, including an Olympic gold medal in 1996, six gold medals and three silver medals at the European Championships in 1996, the men's singles titles at the 1995 and 1996 All England Championships, and a gold, two silver and four bronze medals at the World Championships in 1995. He later coached the national teams of Malaysia and South Africa. Frost also worked as a commentator on the BBC's TV coverage of the badminton tournament at the 2014 Commonwealth Games in Glasgow.

In 2015, Frost accepted a contract to be technical director of the Malaysian national team until the end of 2020. Early 2017, Frost had a fallout with Malaysian former world number 1 player Lee Chong Wei regarding what Lee considered unfair treatment towards him after an injury. In September 2017, Frost resigned from his position in Malaysia, citing personal reasons.

In February 2019, Frost signed a one-year contract to coach India's junior players at the Prakash Padukone Badminton Academy.

In 2020, Frost has been appointed as the performance director of Badminton England.

== Achievements ==
=== World Championships ===
Men's singles
Year	Venue	Opponent	Score	Result
1985	Olympic Saddledome, Calgary, Canada	(China) Han Jian	18–14, 10–15, 8–15	Silver
1987	Capital Indoor Stadium, Beijing, China	(China) Yang Yang	2–15, 15–13, 12–15	Silver

=== World Cup ===
Men's singles
Year	Venue	Opponent	Score	Result
1985	Istora Senayan, Jakarta, Indonesia	(Indonesia) Icuk Sugiarto	11–15, 15–8, 4–15	Silver
1986	Istora Senayan, Jakarta, Indonesia	(Indonesia) Icuk Sugiarto	15–5, 6–15, 11–15	Silver

Men's doubles
Year	Venue	Partner	Opponent	Score	Result
1983	Stadium Negara, Kuala Lumpur, Malaysia	(Denmark) Jens Peter Nierhoff	(Indonesia) Bobby Ertanto (Indonesia) Christian Hadinata	11–15, 15–4, 13–15	Bronze

=== World Games ===
Men's singles
Year	Venue	Opponent	Score	Result
1981	San Jose Civic Auditorium, California, United States	(China) Chen Changjie	15–9, 7–15, 12–15	Silver

=== European Championships ===
Men's singles
Year	Venue	Opponent	Score	Result
1980	Martinihal, Groningen, Netherlands	(Denmark) Flemming Delfs	4–15, 15–1, 14–17	Silver
1984	Guild Hall, Preston, England	(Denmark) Jens Peter Nierhoff	15–8, 15–2	Gold
1986	Fyrishallen, Uppsala, Sweden	(Denmark) Ib Frederiksen	15–8, 15–2	Gold
1988	Badmintonsenteret, Kristiansand, Norway	(England) Darren Hall	15–8, 12–15, 9–15	Silver

Men's doubles
Year	Venue	Partner	Opponent	Score	Result
1984	Guild Hall, Preston, England	(Denmark) Jens Peter Nierhoff	(England) Martin Dew (England) Mike Tredgett	8–15, 10–15	Silver

=== European Junior Championships ===
Boys' singles
Year	Venue	Opponent	Score	Result
1975	Copenhagen, Denmark	(Sweden) Bruno Wackfelt	15–18, 2–15	Silver

=== IBF World Grand Prix (32 titles, 12 runners-up) ===
The World Badminton Grand Prix sanctioned by International Badminton Federation (IBF) from 1983 to 2006.

Men's singles
Year	Tournament	Opponent	Score	Result
1983	Swedish Open	(Malaysia) Misbun Sidek	15–9, 10–15, 13–15	(silver) Runner-up
1983	All England Open	(China) Luan Jin	2–15, 15–12, 4–15	(silver) Runner-up
1983	Scandinavian Open	(India) Prakash Padukone	18–17, 15–2	(gold) Winner
1983	World Grand Prix Finals	(China) Luan Jin	2–15, 6–15	(silver) Runner-up
1984	Chinese Taipei Open	(Indonesia) Hastomo Arbi	15–11, 15–7	(gold) Winner
1984	Japan Open	(Indonesia) Liem Swie King	15–1, 18–15	(gold) Winner
1984	Scottish Open	(England) Kevin Jolly	15–11, 15–2	(gold) Winner
1984	Denmark Open	(Denmark) Jens Peter Nierhoff	15–1, 15–2	(gold) Winner
1984	All England Open	(Indonesia) Liem Swie King	9–15, 15–10, 15–10	(gold) Winner
1984	Malaysia Open	(Indonesia) Icuk Sugiarto	9–15, 4–15	(silver) Runner-up
1984	Scandinavian Open	(China) Han Jian	15–10, 15–9	(gold) Winner
1984	World Grand Prix Finals	(Indonesia) Liem Swie King	15–5, 15–4	(gold) Winner
1985	Hong Kong Open	(China) Yang Yang	10–15, 11–15	(silver) Runner-up
1985	Denmark Open	(South Korea) Sung Han-kuk	15–4, 15–5	(gold) Winner
1985	All England Open	(China) Zhao Jianhua	15–6, 10–15, 15–18	(silver) Runner-up
1985	English Masters	(England) Steve Baddeley	15–12, 11–15, 15–11	(gold) Winner
1985	Malaysia Masters	(Malaysia) Misbun Sidek	15–4, 15–7	(gold) Winner
1985	Scandinavian Open	(Indonesia) Lius Pongoh	15–5, 15–8	(gold) Winner
1986	German Open	(Denmark) Michael Kjeldsen	15–4, 15–3	(gold) Winner
1986	Scandinavian Open	(Denmark) Torben Carlsen	15–5, 15–5	(gold) Winner
1986	All England Open	(Malaysia) Misbun Sidek	15–2, 15–8	(gold) Winner
1986	Denmark Open	(Denmark) Michael Kjeldsen	15–9, 15–10	(gold) Winner
1986	English Masters	(Australia) Sze Yu	15–8, 15–5	(gold) Winner
1986	World Grand Prix Finals	(China) Yang Yang	13–18, 8–15	(silver) Runner-up
1987	Poona Open	(Denmark) Jens Peter Nierhoff	15–11, 15–11	(gold) Winner
1987	All England Open	(Indonesia) Icuk Sugiarto	15–10, 15–0	(gold) Winner
1987	English Masters	(England) Steve Baddeley	18–13, 15–18, 15–12	(gold) Winner
1988	Poona Open	(Denmark) Ib Frederiksen	15–10, 15–9	(gold) Winner
1988	German Open	(China) Xiong Guobao	15–4, 15–6	(gold) Winner
1988	All England Open	(Denmark) Ib Frederiksen	15–8, 7–15, 10–15	(silver) Runner-up
1988	French Open	(Indonesia) Icuk Sugiarto	10–15, 15–6, 2–15	(silver) Runner-up
1988	English Masters	(Indonesia) Ardy Wiranata	15–8, 15–8	(gold) Winner
1988	Scottish Open	(England) Nick Yates	15–7, 15–5	(gold) Winner
1989	Chinese Taipei Open	(Indonesia) Eddy Kurniawan	15–12, 15–3	(gold) Winner
1989	Swedish Open	(Indonesia) Alan Budikusuma	15–4, 15–4	(gold) Winner
1989	All England Open	(China) Yang Yang	6–15, 7–15	(silver) Runner-up
1989	German Open	(England) Steve Baddeley	15–6, 15–4	(gold) Winner
1989	Denmark Open	(China) Zhao Jianhua	15–12, 15–13	(gold) Winner
1989	Scottish Open	(Denmark) Jens Peter Nierhoff	15–2, 15–5	(gold) Winner
1990	Finnish Open	(Indonesia) Hermawan Susanto	15–13, 4–15, 15–9	(gold) Winner
1990	Japan Open	(Denmark) Poul-Erik Høyer Larsen	15–9, 15–4	(gold) Winner
1990	Denmark Open	(Denmark) Poul-Erik Høyer Larsen	15–4, 10–15, 15–17	(silver) Runner-up

Men's doubles
Year	Tournament	Partner	Opponent	Score	Result
1984	Scottish Open	(Denmark) Jesper Helledie	(England) Duncan Bridge (England) Nigel Tier	15–11, 15–11	(gold) Winner
1984	Denmark Open	(Denmark) Jens Peter Nierhoff	(China) Li Yongbo (China) Tian Bingyi	7–15, 2–15	(silver) Runner-up

=== IBF International ===
Men's singles

Year	Tournament	Partner	Score	Result
1977	USSR International			(gold) Winner
1977	Norwegian International	(Sweden) Thomas Angarth	15–2, 15–5	(gold) Winner
1978	Nordic Championships	(Denmark) Flemming Delfs	5–15, 15–6, 15–4	(gold) Winner
1979	Dutch Open	(Denmark) Flemming Delfs	6–15, 15–3, 15–16	(silver) Runner-up
1979	Denmark Open	(Denmark) Flemming Delfs	7–15, 7–15	(silver) Runner-up
1979	English Masters	(India) Prakash Padukone	4–15, 11–15	(silver) Runner-up
1979	Canadian Open	(Denmark) Flemming Delfs	15–7, 14–17, 15–7	(gold) Winner
1979	Randers Open	(Denmark) Flemming Delfs	10–15, 15–18	(silver) Runner-up
1979	Nordic Championships	(Denmark) Flemming Delfs	15–6, 15–4	(gold) Winner
1980	Copenhagen Cup	(India) Prakash Padukone	15–8, 10–15, 15–9	(gold) Winner
1980	Denmark Open	(India) Prakash Padukone	7–15, 13–18	(silver) Runner-up
1980	Canadian Open	(Denmark) Steen Fladberg	15–7, 15–11	(gold) Winner
1980	Nordic Championships	(Sweden) Thomas Kihlström	15–4, 15–7	(gold) Winner
1981	Denmark Open	(India) Prakash Padukone	15–7, 15–5	(gold) Winner
1981	Swedish Open	(Indonesia) Lius Pongoh	14–18, 13–15	(silver) Runner-up
1981	Scandinavian Cup	(India) Prakash Padukone	15–4, 15–11	(gold) Winner
1981	Nordic Championships	(Denmark) Flemming Delfs	18–17, 15–5	(gold) Winner
1982	Scottish Open	(Denmark) Flemming Delfs	15–4, 15–2	(gold) Winner
1982	German Open	(Denmark) Jens Peter Nierhoff	15–12, 13–15, 15–8	(gold) Winner
1982	Denmark Open	(India) Prakash Padukone	15–7, 15–8	(gold) Winner
1982	All England Open	(China) Luan Jin	11–15, 15–2, 15–7	(gold) Winner
1982	Nordic Championships	(Denmark) Jens Peter Nierhoff	15–2, 15–6	(gold) Winner
1982	Scandinavian Cup	(India) Prakash Padukone	15–3, 15–4	(gold) Winner
1983	Scottish Open	(England) Kevin Jolly	15–2, 15–6	(gold) Winner
1983	Dutch Open	(India) Prakash Padukone	15–11, 15–4	(gold) Winner
1983	Denmark Open			(gold) Winner
1983	Nordic Championships	(Denmark) Michael Kjeldsen	10–15, 15–12, 15–1	(gold) Winner
1983	India Masters	(India) Prakash Padukone	15–7, 15–13	(gold) Winner
1984	English Masters	(China) Han Jian	15–8, 18–15	(gold) Winner
1984	Dutch Masters	(China) Han Jian	9–15, 14–18	(silver) Runner-up
1984	Nordic Championships	(Denmark) Jens Peter Nierhoff	17–14, 15–6	(gold) Winner
1984	Scottish Open	(China) Zhao Jianhua	12–15, 15–8, 9–15	(silver) Runner-up
1984	Welsh International	(England) Darren Hall	15–2, 15–6	(gold) Winner
1985	Malaysia Masters	(Malaysia) Misbun Sidek	15–4, 15–7	(gold) Winner
1986	Bell's Open	(Denmark) Ib Frederiksen	15–6, 15–5	(gold) Winner
1983	Nordic Championships	(Denmark) Michael Kjeldsen	12–15, 9–15	(silver) Runner-up
1988	Nordic Championships	(Denmark) Poul-Erik Høyer Larsen	15–6, 15–6	(gold) Winner

Men's doubles
Year	Tournament	Partner	Opponent	Score	Result
1976	Czechoslovakian International	(Denmark) Steen Fladberg	(Germany) Wolfgang Bochow (Germany) Roland Maywald	12–15, 8–15	(silver) Runner-up
1977	USSR International	(Denmark) Steen Skovgaard			(gold) Winner
1977	Norwegian International	(Denmark) Mogens Neergaard	(Sweden) Ola Eriksson (Sweden) Christian Lundberg	9–15, 6–15	(silver) Runner-up
1979	Swedish Open	(Denmark) Steen Fladberg	(Denmark) Flemming Delfs (Denmark) Steen Skovgaard	12–15, 15–12, 10–15	(silver) Runner-up
1979	Dutch Open	(Denmark) Steen Fladberg	(England) Elliot Stuart (England) Derek Talbot	8–15, 17–18	(silver) Runner-up
1979	Canadian Open	(Denmark) Flemming Delfs	(Indonesia) Ade Chandra (Indonesia) Christian Hadinata	5–15, 1–15	(silver) Runner-up
1980	Copenhagen Cup	(Denmark) Steen Fladberg	(Denmark) Flemming Delfs (Denmark) Steen Skovgaard	8–15, 6–15	(silver) Runner-up
1980	Nordic Championships	(Denmark) Steen Fladberg	(Sweden) Claes Nordin (Sweden) Lars Wengberg	3–15, 15–3, 15–11	(gold) Winner
1981	Nordic Championships	(Denmark) Steen Fladberg	(Denmark) Flemming Delfs (Denmark) Steen Skovgaard	15–9, 15–5	(gold) Winner
1981	Scandinavian Cup	(Denmark) Steen Fladberg	(China) Luan Jin (China) Lin Jiangli	11–15, 15–6, 12–15	(silver) Runner-up
1982	German Open	(Denmark) Steen Fladberg	(China) Jiang Guoliang (China) He Shangquan	15–5, 15–6	(gold) Winner
1982	Nordic Championships	(Denmark) Steen Fladberg	(Denmark) Jesper Helledie (Denmark) Steen Skovgaard	15–6, 15–18, 15–6	(gold) Winner
1983	Nordic Championships	(Denmark) Jens Peter Nierhoff	(Sweden) Stefan Karlsson (Sweden) Thomas Kihlström	12–15, 15–17	(silver) Runner-up
1984	English Masters	(Denmark) Jens Peter Nierhoff	(Indonesia) Hadibowo (Indonesia) Christian Hadinata	3–15, 3–15	(silver) Runner-up
1984	Scottish Open	(Denmark) Jens Peter Nierhoff	(England) Andy Goode (England) Nigel Tier	12–15, 15–8, 9–15	(silver) Runner-up
1984	Welsh International	(England) Martin Dew	(Scotland) Billy Gilliland (Scotland) Dan Travers	8–15, 15–18	(silver) Runner-up
1986	Nordic Championships	(Denmark) Steen Fladberg	(Sweden) Jan-Eric Antonsson (Sweden) Pär-Gunnar Jönsson	15–10, 15–12	(gold) Winner

Mixed doubles
Year	Tournament	Partner	Opponent	Score	Result
1977	Norwegian International	(Denmark) Pia Nielsen	(Denmark) Mogens Neergaard (Denmark) Inge Borgstrøm	6–15, 3–15	(silver) Runner-up
1981	English Masters	(Denmark) Lene Køppen	(England) Mike Tredgett (England) Nora Perry	5–15, 6–15	(silver) Runner-up
1982	Scottish Open	(Denmark) Lene Køppen	(Scotland) Billy Gilliland (England) Gillian Gilks	13–18, 9–15	(silver) Runner-up
1983	Scottish Open	(Denmark) Nettie Nielsen	(Netherlands) Rob Ridder (Netherlands) Marjan Ridder	15–9, 6–15, 15–12	(gold) Winner

== Quotes ==
- "Jeg hader at tabe mere end de fleste. Jeg har en vilje til at vinde HVER gang!" ("I hate to lose more than most. I have the will to win EVERY time!") – Morten Frost
- "He used to give international players in England a 14-0 start. And if they won, the bet was they would take the money. And most of the players would take the bet, but they made very little money. After that they found they couldn't win, so they never took the bet. But that's how you train not to make errors." – Tom John on Morten Frost
