= Liem Swie King =

Indonesian badminton player (born 1956)

Personal information
- Born: 28 February 1956 (age 70) Kudus Regency, Central Java, Indonesia
- Years active: 1974–1988
- Height: 1.68 m (5 ft 6 in)

Sport
- Country: Indonesia
- Sport: Badminton
- Handedness: Right

Men's singles& doubles
- Highest ranking: 1 (MS 1978)
Medal record
Men's badminton
Representing Indonesia
World Championships
Silver medal – second place	1980 Jakarta	Men's singles
Silver medal – second place	1983 Copenhagen	Men's singles
Bronze medal – third place	1985 Calgary	Men's doubles
World Cup
Gold medal – first place	1979 Tokyo	Men's singles
Gold medal – first place	1980 Kyoto	Men's singles
Gold medal – first place	1982 Kuala Lumpur	Men's singles
Gold medal – first place	1984 Jakarta	Men's doubles
Gold medal – first place	1985 Jakarta	Men's doubles
Gold medal – first place	1986 Jakarta	Men's doubles
Bronze medal – third place	1984 Jakarta	Men's singles
Bronze medal – third place	1987 Jakarta	Men's doubles
Thomas Cup
Gold medal – first place	1976 Bangkok	Men's Team
Gold medal – first place	1979 Jakarta	Men's Team
Gold medal – first place	1984 Kuala Lumpur	Men's team
Silver medal – second place	1982 London	Men's Team
Silver medal – second place	1986 Jakarta	Men's team
Bronze medal – third place	1988 Kuala Lumpur	Men's team
World Games
Bronze medal – third place	1981 Santa Clara	Men's singles
Asian Games
Gold medal – first place	1978 Bangkok	Men's singles
Gold medal – first place	1978 Bangkok	Men's team
Silver medal – second place	1982 New Delhi	Men's singles
Silver medal – second place	1982 New Delhi	Men's team
Silver medal – second place	1974 Tehran	Men's team
Bronze medal – third place	1974 Tehran	Men's singles
Bronze medal – third place	1986 Seoul	Men's doubles
Bronze medal – third place	1986 Seoul	Men's team
Asian Championships
Gold medal – first place	1976 Hyderabad	Men's team
Silver medal – second place	1976 Hyderabad	Men's singles
Silver medal – second place	1987 Semarang	Men's team
SEA Games
Gold medal – first place	1977 Kuala Lumpur	Men's singles
Gold medal – first place	1977 Kuala Lumpur	Men's team
Gold medal – first place	1979 Jakarta	Men's team
Gold medal – first place	1981 Manila	Men's singles
Gold medal – first place	1981 Manila	Men's team
Gold medal – first place	1983 Singapore	Men's team
Gold medal – first place	1985 Bangkok	Men's team
Gold medal – first place	1987 Jakarta	Men's doubles
Gold medal – first place	1987 Jakarta	Men's team
Silver medal – second place	1985 Bangkok	Men's doubles

Liem Swie King (Chinese: 林水鏡; pinyin: Lín Shuǐjìng; born 28 February 1956) is an Indonesian badminton player who excelled from the late 1970s through the mid-1980s. He won the All England in 1978, 1979 and 1981. He was one of the world's leading singles players of his era. A world level player in men's doubles as well as men's singles, he was known for the ferocity of his jumping smash. Liem was the first ever men's singles number one in the first IBF world ranking release in 1978.

== Early life ==
Liem was born on 28 February 1956 in Kudus Regency, Central Java. His parents were Ng Thian Poo and Oei See Moi from Putian, Fujian. He was the only son among his parents' eight children. During elementary school, he studied at Sekolah Tionghoa, and later moved to SD Negeri Dema'an II in 1965. In 1974, he chose a name suggested by his older sister, Guntur (meaning: thunder), in order to comply with government direction for any Indonesian with Chinese name to adopt what is considered as an "Indonesian name", however it did not affect how people addressed him in public or in competition. His physical trainer, Tahir Djide, said, "It is easier to pronounce King, rather than Guntur".

== Career ==
While watching a local badminton competition, Budi Hartono, the owner of a prestigious badminton club, Djarum Badminton Club, recognized Liem's talent at the age of 14. Despite the loss he took in the final match, Liem was invited to join the club. With proper coaching, it did not take long for the teenage Liem to start overwhelming opponents with his fast-paced style in various local youth badminton tournaments.

In 1972 at the age of 15, Liem became the junior single champion of Central Java. In November 1972, he tasted his first international tournament, the First Djakarta Badminton Open Tournament, defeating Singapore's Ng Choi Yu in the first stage, before succumbing to Thailand's Sangob Ratananusorn. Later, he won Moenadi Cup, in men's singles and men's doubles categories, pairing with his childhood friend, Hariamanto Kartono.

In 1973, Liem was called to join the provincial badminton squad for National Sports Competition (Pekan Olahraga Nasional) VIII. He reached the men's singles final by defeating senior players, before finally losing to a veteran national squad member, Iie Sumirat. In the same year, he won a local tournament, Kejuaraan Dunia Bulu Tangkis Piala Garuda (Garuda Cup Badminton World Championship) in Tegal.

While still in high school, in 1974, Liem won the national championship. In the same year he participated in the All England for the first time. Later on, Liem won the All-England Men's Singles Championships in 1978, 1979 and 1981 during a six-consecutive-year run to the finals (1976–1981) of what was then perhaps the world's most prestigious badminton tournament. He was the runner-up at the then triennial World Championships in both 1980 and 1983 to, consecutively, fellow Indonesians Rudy Hartono and Icuk Sugiarto. He was a member of the Thomas Cup winning Indonesian teams of 1976, 1979, and 1984, playing both singles and doubles on the latter two occasions. He also played in the Thomas Cup in the years 1982 and 1986. He was a bronze medalist in the men's doubles together with Kartono at the 1985 IBF World Championships in Calgary.

He retired from badminton in 1988, and now owns a health spa in Jakarta.

== "King Smash" ==
Liem's is well known for his iconic jumping smash, which has been recognized as the most aggressive type of offensive strokes in badminton. Although some players were claimed to originate the move, Liem was widely accepted as the man who popularized the jumping smash. Unlike most pro players before him, who used hopping leg action to compensate the lateral gap to reach the shuttlecock, Liem effectively used a higher vertical leap in executing his smash.

As his popularity increased, badminton enthusiasts around the world began to associate that kind of hard-hitting, leaping smash with Liem, earning it the nickname King Smash. Liem's move was considered revolutionary during his era, but now it has become a standard attacking skill for badminton pros.

Liem's vertical leap explosiveness came from his low crouching stance before launching his jump, he then intercepted the shuttlecock at high altitude with a ferocious whipping strike, or sometimes a deceptive drop shot which immobilized his opponent who was expecting a slamming hit from him. By intercepting the shuttlecock at higher altitude, Liem was able to deliver a shot with steeper angle. Given his average stature, his jump-smash made a quite dramatic visual for the spectators, due to the perceived height of his leap. In an interview, Liem explained that he began to do jump-smash around 1977. He liked fast-paced style and simply wanted to hit the shuttlecock quicker. No coaches complained about it since they saw it improved Liem's game.

Racket known to have been used by Liem is Carbonex 15.

== Personal life ==
King met his wife Lucia Alamsah in 1976 and they have three children, Alexander, Stephanie and Michelle. King's life and achievements were the inspiration for the 2009 Indonesian movie "King" (2009) in which he made a cameo appearance. That same year, Robert Adhi Kusumaputra published a biography on the Indonesian legend, titled "Call Me, King" (Panggil Aku, King).

== Awards and nominations ==
Award	Year	Category	Result	Ref.
International Badminton Federation Awards	1986	Distinguished Service Award	Honored	
International Badminton Federation Awards	2002	Badminton Hall of Fame	Honored	

== Achievements ==
=== World Championships ===
Men's singles
Year	Venue	Opponent	Score	Result	Ref.
1980	Istora Senayan, Jakarta, Indonesia	(Indonesia) Rudy Hartono	9–15, 9–15	Silver	
1983	Brøndbyhallen, Copenhagen, Denmark	(Indonesia) Icuk Sugiarto	8–15, 15–12, 16–17	Silver	

Men's doubles
Year	Venue	Partner	Opponent	Score	Result
1985	Olympic Saddledome, Calgary, Canada	(Indonesia) Hariamanto Kartono	(South Korea) Kim Moon-soo (South Korea) Park Joo-bong	11–15, 15–17	Bronze

=== World Cup ===
Men's singles
Year	Venue	Opponent	Score	Result	Ref.
1979	Tokyo, Japan	(Indonesia) Iie Sumirat	15–8, 15–8	Gold	
1980	Kyoto, Japan	(Japan) Masao Tsuchida	15–6, 15–10	Gold	
1982	Stadium Negara, Kuala Lumpur, Malaysia	(Malaysia) Misbun Sidek	15–12, 3–15, 15–12	Gold	
1984	Istora Senayan, Jakarta, Indonesia	(China) Han Jian	14–17, 13–15	Bronze	

Men's doubles
Year	Venue	Partner	Opponent	Score	Result	Ref.
1984	Istora Senayan, Jakarta, Indonesia	(Indonesia) Hariamanto Kartono	(China) Li Yongbo (China) Tian Bingyi	15–8, 15–1	Gold	
1985	Istora Senayan, Jakarta, Indonesia	(Indonesia) Hariamanto Kartono	(China) Li Yongbo (China) Tian Bingyi	15–11, 11–15, 15–11	Gold	
1986	Istora Senayan, Jakarta, Indonesia	(Indonesia) Bobby Ertanto	(Indonesia) Hadibowo Susanto (Indonesia) Rudy Heryanto	15–6, 15–5	Gold	
1987	Stadium Negara, Kuala Lumpur, Malaysia	(Indonesia) Eddy Hartono	(South Korea) Park Joo-bong (South Korea) Kim Moon-soo	7–15, 18–13, 13–15	Bronze	

=== World Games ===
Men's singles
Year	Venue	Opponent	Score	Result
1981	San Jose Civic Auditorium, California, United States	(Denmark) Morten Frost	14–18, 15–11, 6–15	Bronze

=== Asian Games ===
Men's singles
Year	Venue	Opponent	Score	Result
1974	Amjadieh Sport Complex, Tehran, Iran	(Malaysia) Tan Aik Mong	15–12, 15–10	Bronze
1978	Bangkok, Thailand	(China) Han Jian	15–7, 15–11	Gold
1982	Indraprastha Indoor Stadium; New Delhi, India	(China) Han Jian	16–18, 10–15	Silver

Men's doubles
Year	Venue	Partner	Opponent	Score	Result
1986	Olympic Gymnastics Arena, Seoul, South Korea	(Indonesia) Bobby Ertanto	(China) Li Yongbo (China) Tian Bingyi	6–15, 9–15	Bronze

=== Asian Championships ===
Men's singles
Year	Venue	Opponent	Score	Result	Ref.
1976	Lal Bahadur Shastri Stadium, Hyderabad; India	(China) Hou Jiachang	16–17, 9–15	Silver	

=== SEA Games ===
Men's singles
Year	Venue	Opponent	Score	Result
1977	Kuala Lumpur, Malaysia	(Indonesia) Dhany Sartika	15–9, 15–5	Gold
1981	Camp Crame Gymnasium, Quezon City, Philippines	(Indonesia) Hastomo Arbi	15–2, 15–7	Gold

Men's doubles
Year	Venue	Partner	Opponent	Score	Result
1983	Singapore Badminton Hall, Singapore	(Indonesia) Hadibowo Susanto	(Indonesia) Bobby Ertanto (Indonesia) Christian Hadinata	15–8, 9–15, 5–15	Silver
1985	Chulalongkorn University Indoor Stadium; Bangkok, Thailand	(Indonesia) Hariamanto Kartono	(Malaysia) Jalani Sidek (Malaysia) Razif Sidek	15–6, 11–15, 5–15	Silver
1987	Kuningan Hall, Jakarta, Indonesia	(Indonesia) Eddy Hartono	(Thailand) Sawei Chanseorasmee (Thailand) Sakrapee Thongsari	17–14, 15–9	Gold

=== International open tournaments (14 titles, 8 runners-up) ===
Men's singles
Year	Tournament	Opponent	Score	Result
1976	All England	(Indonesia) Rudy Hartono	7–15, 7–15	(silver) Runner-up
1977	All England	(Denmark) Flemming Delfs	17–15, 11–15, 8–15	(silver) Runner-up
1977	Swedish Open	(Denmark) Flemming Delfs	15–4, 15–8	(gold) Winner
1978	All England	(Indonesia) Rudy Hartono	15–10, 15–3	(gold) Winner
1978	Denmark Open	(Sweden) Thomas Kihlström	8–15, 15–9, 15–7	(gold) Winner
1979	All England	(Denmark) Flemming Delfs	15–7, 15–8	(gold) Winner
1980	All England	(India) Prakash Padukone	3–15, 10–15	(silver) Runner-up
1980	English Masters	(Indonesia) Rudy Hartono	15–11, 15–3	(gold) Winner
1981	All England	(India) Prakash Padukone	11–15, 15–4, 15–6	(gold) Winner
1983	Indonesia Open	(Indonesia) Hastomo Arbi	15–6, 15–1	(gold) Winner
1983	Malaysia Open	(Indonesia) Hastomo Arbi	15–1, 15–11	(gold) Winner
1984	All England	(Denmark) Morten Frost	15–9, 10–15, 10–15	(silver) Runner-up
1984	Japan Open	(Denmark) Morten Frost	8–15, 1–15	(silver) Runner-up
1984	World Grand Prix Finals	(Denmark) Morten Frost	5–15, 4–15	(silver) Runner-up

Men's doubles
Year	Tournament	Partner	Opponent	Score	Result
1985	Indonesia Open	(Indonesia) Hariamanto Kartono	(China) Li Yongbo (China) Tian Bingyi	15–5, 15–10	(gold) Winner
1986	Indonesia Open	(Indonesia) Hariamanto Kartono	(Malaysia) Jalani Sidek (Malaysia) Razif Sidek	15–3, 12–15, 15–12	(gold) Winner
1987	Chinese Taipei Open	(Indonesia) Eddy Hartono	(Denmark) Mark Christiansen (Sweden) Stefan Karlsson	15–4, 15–5	(gold) Winner
1987	Japan Open	(Indonesia) Eddy Hartono	(South Korea) Lee Deuk-choon (South Korea) Shon Jin-hwan	15–4, 15–7	(gold) Winner
1987	Thailand Open	(Indonesia) Eddy Hartono	(China) Li Yongbo (China) Tian Bingyi	13–15, 11–15	(silver) Runner-up
1987	Indonesia Open	(Indonesia) Eddy Hartono	(Indonesia) Bobby Ertanto (Indonesia) Rudy Heryanto	15–6, 15–8	(gold) Winner
1987	Singapore Open	(Indonesia) Bobby Ertanto	(Indonesia) Hadibowo (Indonesia) Rudy Heryanto	15–2, 15–4	(gold) Winner
1988	US Open	(India) Prakash Padukone	(Indonesia) Christian Hadinata (Indonesia) Lius Pongoh	15–7, 11–15, 13–15	(silver) Runner-up

IBF Grand Prix tournament
IBF Grand Prix Finals tournament

== Bibliography ==
- Kusumaputra, Robert Adhi (2009). Panggil Aku King [Call Me King] (in Indonesian). Jakarta: Penerbit Buku Kompas. ISBN 978-979-709-421-8.
- Setyautama, Sam; Mihardja, Suma (2008). Tokoh-Tokoh Etnis Tionghoa di Indonesia [Figures of Ethnic Chinese in Indonesia] (in Indonesian). Jakarta: Kepustakaan Populer Gramedia. ISBN 978-979-9101-25-9.
