= Prakash Padukone =

Indian badminton player (born 1955)

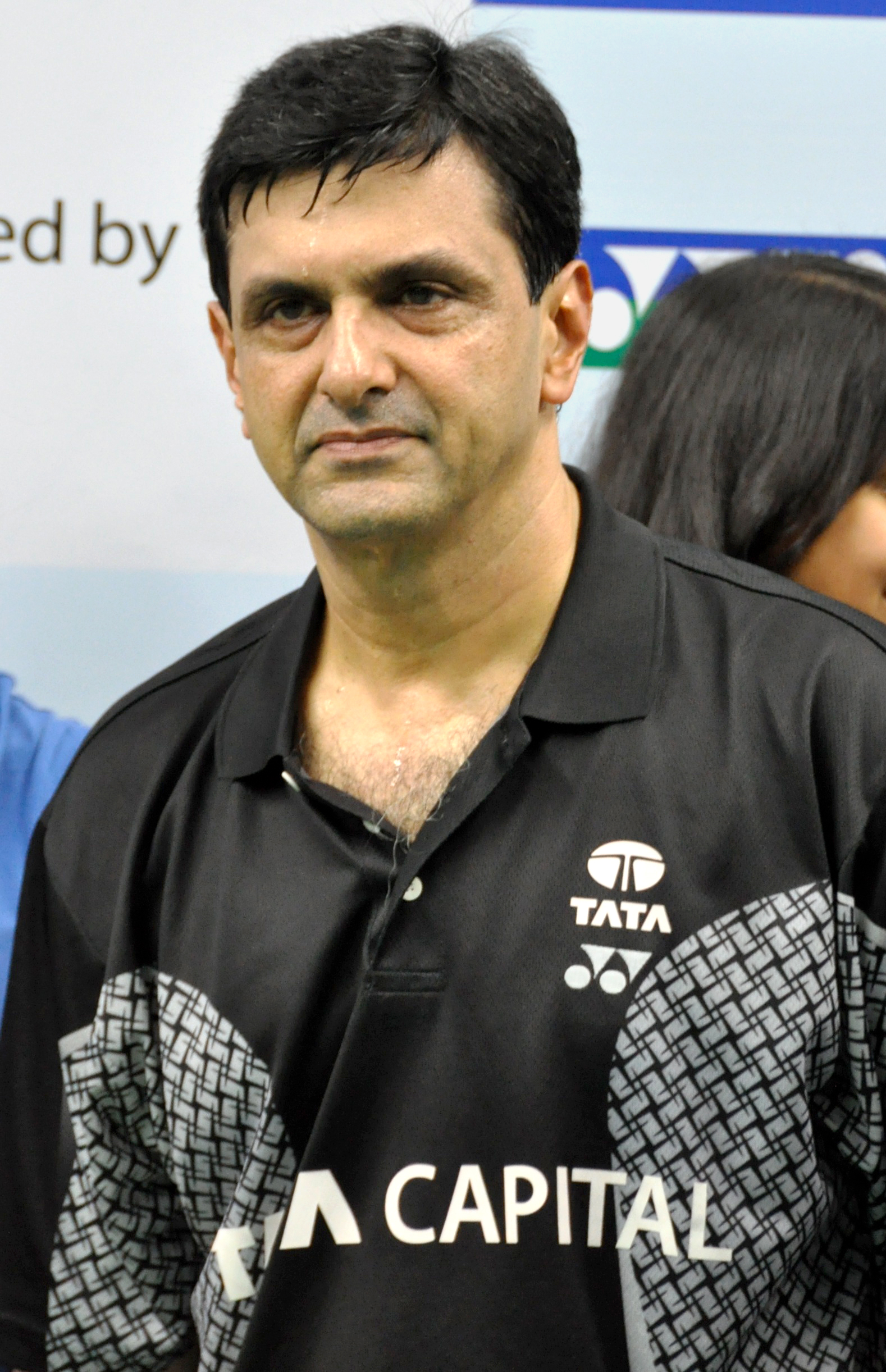
- Padukone at the Tata Open championship in 2009

Personal information
- Born: Prakash Padukone; 10 June 1955 (age 71) Bengaluru, Mysore State (present-day Karnataka), India
- Height: 1.85 m (6 ft 1 in)
- Weight: 75 kg (165 lb)

Sport
- Country: India
- Sport: Badminton
- Handedness: Right

Men's singles
- Highest ranking: 1 (1980)
Medal record
Men's badminton
Representing India
World Championships
Bronze medal – third place	1983 Copenhagen	Men's singles
World Cup
Gold medal – first place	1981 Kuala Lumpur	Men's singles
Bronze medal – third place	1980 Kyoto	Men's singles
World Games
Bronze medal – third place	1981 Santa Clara	Men's singles
Commonwealth Games
Gold medal – first place	1978 Edmonton	Men's singles
Asian Games
Bronze medal – third place	1974 Tehran	Men's Team
Bronze medal – third place	1986 Seoul	Men's Team
Asian Championships
Silver medal – second place	1983 Calcutta	Men's team
Bronze medal – third place	1976 Hyderabad	Men's singles
- Honours: Arjuna award (1972); Padma Shri (1982)

Prakash Padukone (born 10 June 1955) is an Indian former badminton player. He was ranked World No. 1 in 1980 and the same year he became the first Indian to win the All England Open. He was awarded the Arjuna award in 1972 and the Padma Shri in 1982 by the Government of India. He is one of the co-founders of Olympic Gold Quest, a foundation dedicated to the promotion of Olympic sports in India.

== Early life ==
Padukone was born on 10 June 1955 in Bangalore in Karnataka. His father, Ramesh, was a secretary of the Mysore Badminton Association.

== Career ==
Prakash was initiated into the game by his father Ramesh Padukone, who was the Secretary of Mysore Badminton Association for many years.

Padukone's first official tournament was the Karnataka state junior championship in 1962, which he lost in the very first round. However, two years later he managed to win the state junior title. He changed his playing style to a more aggressive one in 1971, and won the Indian national junior title in 1972. He also won the senior title the same year. He won the national title consecutively for the next seven years. In 1978, he won his first major international title, the men's singles gold medal at the 1978 Commonwealth Games in Edmonton, Canada. In 1979, he won the "Evening of Champions" at the Royal Albert Hall, London.

In 1980, he won the Danish Open, the Swedish Open and became the first Indian to win the men's singles title at the All England Championship with a victory over Indonesia's Liem Swie King, who was one of the world's leading singles players of his era. Padukone spent much of his international career training in Denmark, and developed close friendships with European players such as Morten Frost.

== Other services ==
After his retirement from competitive sports in 1991, Padukone served as the chairman of the Badminton Association of India for a short while. He also served as the coach of the Indian national badminton team from 1993 to 1996. He co-founded Olympic Gold Quest with Geet Sethi, a foundation dedicated to the promotion of Olympic sports in India.

== Personal life ==
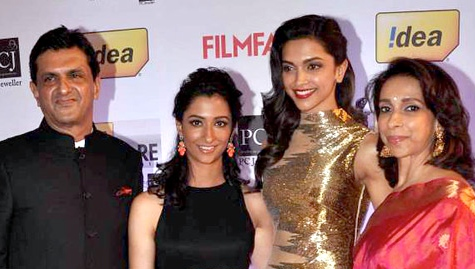
Prakash Padukone with family

Padukone is married to his second cousin, Ujjala Padukone, a homemaker, since 1984. They have two daughters, actress Deepika Padukone and badminton player Anisha Padukone. Deepika Padukone is married to actor Ranveer Singh.

== Achievements ==
=== World Championships ===
Men's singles
Year	Venue	Opponent	Score	Result
1983	Brøndbyhallen, Copenhagen, Denmark	(Indonesia) Icuk Sugiarto	15–9, 7–15, 1–15	Bronze

=== World Cup ===
Men's singles
Year	Venue	Opponent	Score	Result
1980	Kyoto, Japan	(Indonesia) Liem Swie King	12–15, 6–15	Bronze
1981	Stadium Negara, Kuala Lumpur, Malaysia	(China) Han Jian	15–0, 18–16	Gold

=== World Games ===
Men's singles
Year	Venue	Opponent	Score	Result
1981	San Jose Civic Auditorium, California, United States	(China) Chen Changjie	14–18, 16–18	Bronze

=== Asian Championships ===
Men's singles
Year	Venue	Opponent	Score	Result
1976	Lal Bahadur Shastri Stadium, Hyderabad; India	(Indonesia) Liem Swie King	8–15, 3–15	Bronze

=== Commonwealth Games ===
Men's singles
Year	Venue	Opponent	Score	Result
1978	Edmonton, Alberta, Canada	(England) Derek Talbot	15–9, 15–8	Gold

=== International tournaments ===
Men's singles
Year	Tournament	Opponent	Score	Result
1979	India Open	(Indonesia) Dhany Sartika	15–10, 11–15, 12–15	(silver) Runner-up
1979	English Masters	(Denmark) Morten Frost	15–4, 15–11	(gold) Winner
1980	Copenhagen Cup	(Denmark) Morten Frost	8–15, 15–10, 9–15	(silver) Runner-up
1980	Denmark Open	(Denmark) Morten Frost	15–7, 18–13	(gold) Winner
1980	All England	(Indonesia) Liem Swie King	15–3, 15–10	(gold) Winner
1980	Swedish Open	(Indonesia) Rudy Hartono	9–15, 15–12, 15–1	(gold) Winner
1981	Denmark Open	(Denmark) Morten Frost	7–15, 5–15	(silver) Runner-up
1981	All England	(Indonesia) Liem Swie King	15–11, 4–15, 6–15	(silver) Runner-up
1981	English Masters	(China) Luan Jin	9–15, 8–15	(silver) Runner-up
1981	India Open	(China) Han Jian	9–15, 15–5, 15–12	(gold) Winner
1981	Scandinavian Open	(Denmark) Morten Frost	4–15, 11–15	(silver) Runner-up
1982	Dutch Open	(England) Ray Stevens	5–15, 15–2, 15–2	(gold) Winner
1982	Denmark Open	(Denmark) Morten Frost	7–15, 8–15	(silver) Runner-up
1982	Scandinavian Open	(Denmark) Morten Frost	3–15, 4–15	(silver) Runner-up
1983	Chinese Taipei Open	(Indonesia) Icuk Sugiarto	10–15, 8–15	(silver) Runner-up
1983	Japan Open	(China) Han Jian	15–6, 8–15, 9–15	(silver) Runner-up
1983	Dutch Open	(Denmark) Morten Frost	11–15, 4–15	(silver) Runner-up
1983	Scandinavian Open	(Denmark) Morten Frost	17–18, 2–15	(silver) Runner-up
1983	India Open	(Denmark) Morten Frost	7–15, 13–15	(silver) Runner-up
1984	Thailand Open	(Indonesia) Icuk Sugiarto	15–13, 5–15, 4–15	(silver) Runner-up
1985	Chinese Taipei Open	(Indonesia) Lius Pongoh	15–5, 9–15, 10–15	(silver) Runner-up

Men's doubles
Year	Tournament	Partner	Opponent	Score	Result
1981	Japan Open	(Denmark) Flemming Delfs	(Indonesia) Christian Hadinata (Indonesia) Lius Pongoh	4–15, 5–15	(silver) Runner-up
1988	U.S. Open	(Indonesia) Liem Swie King	(Indonesia) Christian Hadinata (Indonesia) Lius Pongoh	15–7, 11–15, 13–15	(silver) Runner-up

=== Invitational tournaments ===
Men's doubles
Year	Tournament	Partner	Opponent	Score	Result
1978	Asian Invitational Championships; Capital Indoor Stadium; Peking, China	(India) Syed Modi	(China) Lin Shiquan (China) Tang Xianhu	3–15, 5–15	Silver
