= Han Jian (badminton) =

Chinese badminton player

Han Jian 韩健
Personal information
- Born: 6 July 1956 (age 70) Liaoning, China

Sport
- Country: China
- Sport: Badminton
- Event: Men's singles
Medal record
Representing China
Men's badminton
World Championships
Gold medal – first place	1979 Hangzhou	Men's singles
Gold medal – first place	1979 Hangzhou	Men's team
Gold medal – first place	1985 Calgary	Men's Singles
Silver medal – second place	1978 Bangkok	Men's singles
Bronze medal – third place	1983 Copenhagen	Men's Singles
World Cup
Gold medal – first place	1983 Kuala Lumpur	Men's singles
Gold medal – first place	1984 Jakarta	Men's singles
Silver medal – second place	1981 Kuala Lumpur	Men's singles
Bronze medal – third place	1982 Kuala Lumpur	Men's singles
Asian Games
Gold medal – first place	1982 New Delhi	Team
Gold medal – first place	1982 New Delhi	Men's Singles
Silver medal – second place	1978 Bangkok	Team
Silver medal – second place	1978 Bangkok	Men's Singles
Thomas Cup
Gold medal – first place	1982 London	Team
Gold medal – first place	1986 Jakarta	Team
Silver medal – second place	1984 Kuala Lumpur	Team

Han Jian (Chinese: 韩健; born July 6, 1956, in Liaoning) is a Chinese retired badminton player in the early and mid 1980s when China first entered the International Badminton Federation (now Badminton World Federation).

== Career ==
He was one of the world's leading players in his era, known for his cool and steady play. In China he is nicknamed "sticky candy" (牛皮糖), owing to his much-used tactic of using long rallies to pressurize an opponent into making mistakes. Han won the 1985 IBF World Championships beating Morten Frost in the final. He also won a bronze medal at the 1983 IBF World Championships and played singles for China's world champion Thomas Cup (men's international) teams of 1982 and 1986.

== Achievements ==
=== World Championships ===
Men's singles
Year	Venue	Opponent	Score	Result
1978	Bangkok, Thailand	(China) Yu Yaodong	11–15, 11–15	Silver
1979	Hangzhou, China	(Pakistan) Tariq Wadood	15–0, 15–11	Gold
1983	Brøndbyhallen, Copenhagen, Denmark	(Indonesia) Liem Swie King	9–15, 3–15	Bronze
1985	Olympic Saddledome, Calgary, Canada	(Denmark) Morten Frost	14–18, 15–10, 15–8	Gold

=== World Cup ===
Men's singles
Year	Venue	Opponent	Score	Result
1981	Stadium Negara, Kuala Lumpur, Malaysia	(India) Prakash Padukone	0–15, 16–18	Silver
1982	Stadium Negara, Kuala Lumpur, Malaysia	(India) Prakash Padukone	15–5, 15–5	Bronze
1983	Stadium Negara, Kuala Lumpur, Malaysia	(Indonesia) Hastomo Arbi	15–4, 15–13	Gold
1984	Istora Senayan, Jakarta, Indonesia	(China) Yang Yang	15–12, 15–10	Gold

=== Asian Games ===
Men's singles
Year	Venue	Opponent	Score	Result
1978	Bangkok, Thailand	(Indonesia) Liem Swie King	7–15, 11–15	Silver
1982	Indraprastha Indoor Stadium; New Delhi, India	(Indonesia) Liem Swie King	18–16, 15–10	Gold

=== IBF World Grand Prix (5 titles, 2 runners-up) ===
The World Badminton Grand Prix sanctioned by International Badminton Federation (IBF) from 1983 to 2006.

Men's singles
Year	Tournament	Opponent	Score	Result
1981	India Open	(India) Prakash Padukone	15–9, 5–15, 12–15	(silver) Runner-Up
1983	Japan Open	(India) Prakash Padukone	6–15, 15–8, 15–9	(gold) Winner
1984	Scandinavian Open	(Denmark) Morten Frost	10–15, 9–15	(silver) Runner-up
1984	Dutch Masters	(Denmark) Morten Frost	15–9, 18–14	(gold) Winner
1985	Japan Open	(China) Zhao Jianhua	10–15, 3–15	(silver) Runner-up
1985	Swedish Open	(China) Zhao Jianhua	18–14, 1–15, 18–15	(gold) Winner
1985	Indonesia Open	(China) Xu Biao	15–4, 15–3	(gold) Winner
1985	World Grand Prix Finals	(Australia) Sze Yu	15–6, 15–3	(gold) Winner

=== Invitational Tournament ===
Year	Tournament	Opponent	Score	Result
1980	Asian Invitational Badminton Championships	(China) Chen Changjie	15–11, 15–8	(gold) Winner
