= 1986 Thomas Cup qualification =

Tournament details
- Dates: 17 – 23 February 1986
- Location: Asian zone: Bangkok American zone: Vancouver European zone: Mülheim

The qualifying process for the 1986 Thomas Cup took place from 17 to 23 February 1986 to decide the final teams which will play in the final tournament.

== Qualification process ==
The qualification process will be divided into three regions, the Asian Zone, the European Zone and the Pan American Zone. Teams in their respective zone will first compete in a round-robin elimination format. The top two teams will advance to the knockout stages to compete for a place in the final tournament to be held in Jakarta.

Since Indonesia had qualified for the final tournament as both hosts and defending champions, an extra quota was awarded for the third-placed team in the Asian Zone.

=== Qualified teams ===
Country	Qualified as	Qualified on	Final appearance
Indonesia	1984 Thomas Cup winners, 1986 Thomas Cup hosts	18 May 1984	11th
China	Asian Zone winners	23 February 1986	3rd
Malaysia	Asian Zone runners-up	23 February 1986	11th
Singapore	Third place in Asian Zone	22 February 1986	1st
Denmark	European Zone winners	23 February 1986	14th
England	European Zone runners-up	23 February 1986	3rd
Sweden	Third place in European Zone	23 February 1986	2nd
South Korea	American Zone winners	22 February 1986	2nd

== Asian Zone ==
The qualification rounds for the Asian Zone were held from 17 to 22 February at the Nimibutr Stadium in Bangkok, Thailand. Eleven teams took part in qualifying for the final tournament.

=== Group stage ===
==== Group A ====
Pos	Team	Pld	W	L	MF	MA	MD	Pts	Qualification
1	China	2	2	0	10	0	+10	2	Advance to knockout stage
2	Hong Kong	2	1	1	4	6	−2	1	
3	Pakistan	2	0	2	1	9	−8	0	

Source: NewspaperSG

Hong Kong
4
Nimibutr Stadium
17 February 1986

Pakistan
1

		Result
1	Chan Chi Choi	2 – 1 (7–15, 15–8, 15–7)	Zubair Ahmed
2	Yeung Yik Kei	2 – 1 (15–18, 15–2, 15–5)	Zahid Maqbool
3	Lee To Shing	0 – 2 (13–15, 3–15)	Iqbal Hussain
4	Chan Chi Choi; Lai Hung	2 – 0 (15–10, 15–3)	Sher Afghan; Zahid Maqbool
5	Lee To Shing; Wong Lap Chuen	2 – 0 (15–8, 15–2)	Anjum Nishar; Amir Shanim

China
5
Nimibutr Stadium
19 February 1986

Pakistan
0

		Result
1	Han Jian	2 – 0 (15–3, 15–4)	Zubair Ahmed
2	Yang Yang	2 – 0 (15–2, 15–4)	Zahid Maqbool
3	Xu Biao	2 – 0 (15–7, 15–1)	Iqbal Hussain
4	Li Yongbo; Tian Bingyi	2 – 0 (15–3, 15–1)	Sher Afghan; Zahid Maqbool
5	Ding Qiqing; Jiang Guoliang	2 – 0 (15–0, 15–2)	Anjum Nishar; Amir Shanim

China
5
Nimibutr Stadium
21 February 1986

Hong Kong
0

		Result
1	Yang Yang	2 – 0 (15–4, 15–6)	Chan Chi Choi
2	Xiong Guobao	2 – 1 (15–8, 15–4)	Yeung Yik Kei
3	Xu Biao	2 – 0 (15–8, 15–0)	Lee To Shing
4	Ding Qiqing; Jiang Guoliang	2 – 0 (15–3, 15–1)	Chan Chi Choi; Lai Hung
5	Han Jian; Li Yongbo	2 – 0 (15–8, 15–10)	Lee To Shing; Wong Lap Chuen

==== Group B ====
Pos	Team	Pld	W	L	MF	MA	MD	Pts	Qualification
1	Thailand	4	4	0	17	3	+14	4	Advance to knockout stage
2	Singapore	4	3	1	12	8	+4	3	Advance to knockout stage
3	India	4	2	2	14	5	+9	2	
4	Sri Lanka	4	1	3	4	14	−10	1	
5	Nepal	4	0	4	2	19	−17	0	

Source: NewspaperSG

India
2
Nimibutr Stadium
17 February 1986

Singapore
3

		Result
1	Prakash Padukone	2 – 0 (15–4, 15–5)	Wong Shoon Keat
2	Syed Modi	2 – 1 (15–10, 13–15, 15–5)	Abdul Hamid Khan
3	U. Vimal Kumar	0 – 2 (12–15, 4–15)	Lau Wing Cheok
4	Sanat Misra; Sanjay Sharma	0 – 2 (4–15, 8–15)	Tan Eng Han; Tan Khee Wee
5	Partho Ganguli; Vikram Singh	1 – 2 (15–11, 14–17, 6–15)	Lau Wing Cheok; Wong Shoon Keat

Thailand
5
Nimibutr Stadium
17 February 1986

Sri Lanka
0

		Result
1	Sompol Kukasemkij	2 – 0 (15–7, 15–6)	Niroshan Wijekoon
2	Wichit Assavanapakas	2 – 0 (15–7, 15–10)	Udaya Weerakoon
3	Surachai Makkasasithorn	2 – 0 (15–7, 15–4)	Priyantha Wijesekera
4	Sawei Chanseorasmee; Siripong Siripool	2 – 0 (15–5, 15–3)	Udaya Weerakoon; Niroshan Wijekoon
5	Chaiwat Chalermphusitarak; Sarit Pisudchaikul	2 – 0 (15–11, 15–6)	Prasanna Gunasekera; Nihal Sendanayaka

Singapore
4
Nimibutr Stadium
18 February 1986

Nepal
1

		Result
1	Abdul Hamid Khan	2 – 1 (15–8, 14–17, 15–4)	Prakash Rana
2	Lau Wing Cheok	2 – 0 (15–2, 15–1)	Ramji Bahadur Shrestha
3	Benson Wong	1 – 2 (15–10, 3–15, 4–15)	Pratap Adhikari
4	Tan Eng Han; Tan Khee Wee	2 – 0 (15–3, 15–5)	Prakash Rana; Ramji Bahadur Shrestha
5	Wong Shoon Keat; Wong Shoon Soo	2 – 0 (15–6, 15–5)	Pratap Adhikari; Naresh Bahadur Singh

India
5
Nimibutr Stadium
18 February 1986

Sri Lanka
0

		Result
1	Prakash Padukone	2 – 0 (15–6, 15–2)	Niroshan Wijekoon
2	Syed Modi	2 – 0 (15–7, 15–3)	Udaya Weerakoon
3	U. Vimal Kumar	2 – 0 (15–1, 15–5)	Priyantha Wijesekera
4	Partho Ganguli; Vikram Singh	2 – 0 (15–8, 15–3)	Udaya Weerakoon; Niroshan Wijekoon
5	Sanat Misra; Sanjay Sharma	2 – 0 (15–4, 15–2)	Nihal Sendanayaka; Ranil Uduwela

Singapore
4
Nimibutr Stadium
19 February 1986

Sri Lanka
1

		Result
1	Abdul Hamid Khan	0 – 2 (5–15, 8–15)	Niroshan Wijekoon
2	Lau Wing Cheok	2 – 0 (15–5, 15–5)	Udaya Weerakoon
3	Wong Shoon Keat	2 – 0 (15–9, 15–2)	Priyantha Wijesekera
4	Tan Eng Han; Tan Khee Wee	2 – 0 (15–5, 15–3)	Udaya Weerakoon; Niroshan Wijekoon
5	Benson Wong; Wong Shoon Keat	2 – 0 (15–7, 15–8)	K.S. Pushpakumara; Ranil Uduwela

Thailand
5
Nimibutr Stadium
19 February 1986

Nepal
0

		Result
1	Sompol Kukasemkij	2 – 0 (15–6, 15–3)	Prakash Rana
2	Wichit Assavanapakas	2 – 0 (15–12, 15–1)	Ramji Bahadur Shrestha
3	Kasemsak Chatujinda	2 – 0 (15–8, 15–9)	Pratap Adhikari
4	Siripong Siripool; Chaiwat Chalermphusitarak	2 – 0 (15–2, 15–2)	Ramji Bahadur Shrestha; Naresh Bahadur Singh
5	Sawei Chanseorasmee; Sarit Pisudchaikul	2 – 0 (15–6, 15–5)	Pratap Adhikari; Prakash Rana

Thailand
4
Nimibutr Stadium
20 February 1986

Singapore
1

		Result
1	Sompol Kukasemkij	2 – 0 (15–2, 15–1)	Wong Shoon Keat
2	Wichit Assavanapakas	2 – 1 (15–9, 15–8)	Abdul Hamid Khan
3	Surachai Makkasasithorn	1 – 2 (15–9, 16–17, 9–15)	Lau Wing Cheok
4	Sawei Chanseorasmee; Sarit Pisudchaikul	2 – 0 (15–9, 15–7)	Tan Eng Han; Tan Khee Wee
5	Chaiwat Chalermphusitarak; Siripong Siripool	2 – 1 (13–15, 15–13, 15–6)	Abdul Hamid Khan; Lau Wing Cheok

India
5
Nimibutr Stadium
20 February 1986

Nepal
0

		Result
1	Prakash Padukone	2 – 0 (15–1, 15–1)	Ramji Bahadur Shrestha
2	Partho Ganguli	2 – 0 (15–5, 15–4)	Naresh Bahadur Singh
3	U. Vimal Kumar	2 – 0 (15–2, 15–0)	Lava Shrestha
4	Partho Ganguli; Vikram Singh	2 – 0 (15–1, 15–0)	Ramji Bahadur Shrestha; Naresh Bahadur Singh
5	Sanat Misra; Sanjay Sharma	2 – 0 (15–5, 15–2)	Pratap Adhikari; Bal Shankar Shrestha

India
2
Nimibutr Stadium
21 February 1986

Thailand
3

		Result
1	Prakash Padukone	2 – 0 (17–13, 15–9)	Sompol Kukasemkij
2	Syed Modi	1 – 2 (12–15, 17–16, 5–15)	Wichit Assavanapakas
3	U. Vimal Kumar	2 – 0 (18–15, 15–4)	Kasemsak Chatujinda
4	Partho Ganguli; Vikram Singh	0 – 2 (9–15, 10–15)	Chaiwat Chalermphusitarak; Siripong Siripool
5	Sanat Misra; Prakash Padukone	1 – 2 (15–7, 5–15, 8–15)	Sawei Chanseorasmee; Sarit Pisudchaikul

Sri Lanka
3
Nimibutr Stadium
21 February 1986

Nepal
2

		Result
1	Niroshan Wijekoon	2 – 0	Prakash Rana
2	Udaya Weerakoon	2 – 0	Ramji Bahadur Shrestha
3	Priyantha Wijesekera	1 – 2	Pratap Adhikari
4	Niroshan Wijekoon; Udaya Weerakoon	1 – 2	Pratap Adhikari; Prakash Rana
5	Prasanna Gunasekera; Nihal Sendanayaka	2 – 1	Ramji Bahadur Shrestha; Naresh Bahadur Singh

==== Group C ====
Pos	Team	Pld	W	L	MF	MA	MD	Pts	Qualification
1	Malaysia	2	2	0	10	0	+10	2	Advance to knockout stage
2	Australia	2	1	1	4	6	−2	1	
3	Brunei	2	0	2	1	9	−8	0	

Source: NewspaperSG

Australia
4
Nimibutr Stadium
18 February 1986

Brunei
1

		Result
1	Darren McDonald	2 – 0 (15–7, 15–5)	Dallan Foo
2	Michael Scandolera	2 – 0 (15–5, 15–0)	Hasri Ghafar
3	Dennis Todd	2 – 0 (15–3, 15–0)	Sabtu Awang Besar
4	Darren McDonald; Michael Scandolera	0 – 2 (2–15, 7–15)	Dallan Foo; Ishak Mohammad
5	Paul Kong; Dennis Todd	2 – 0 (15–0, 15–1)	Sabtu Awang Besar; Hamdan Abu Bakar

Malaysia
5
Nimibutr Stadium
19 February 1986

Brunei
0

		Result
1	Misbun Sidek	2 – 0 (17–14, 15–3)	Dallan Foo
2	Ong Beng Teong	2 – 0 (15–2, 15–0)	Hasri Ghafar
3	Foo Kok Keong	2 – 0 (15–5, 15–0)	Sabtu Awang Besar
4	Jalani Sidek; Razif Sidek	2 – 0 (15–1, 15–3)	Dallan Foo; Ishak Mohammad
5	Chong Weng Kai; Rashid Sidek	2 – 0 (15–2, 15–3)	Sabtu Awang Besar; Hamdan Abu Bakar

Malaysia
5
Nimibutr Stadium
20 February 1986

Australia
0

		Result
1	Misbun Sidek	2 – 0 (15–4, 15–12)	Darren McDonald
2	Ong Beng Teong	2 – 0 (15–0, 15–7)	Michael Scandolera
3	Foo Kok Keong	2 – 0 (15–3, 15–1)	Dennis Todd
4	Jalani Sidek; Razif Sidek	2 – 0 (15–2, 15–5)	Darren McDonald; Michael Scandolera
5	Ong Beng Teong; Rashid Sidek	2 – 0 (15–11, 15–10)	Paul Kong; Dennis Todd

=== Knockout stage ===
Semi-finals
China	5
Singapore	0
Thailand	1
Malaysia	4

Final
China	4
Malaysia	1
Third place
Thailand	2
Singapore	3

==== Semi-finals ====
China
5
Nimibutr Stadium
22 February 1986

Singapore
0

		Result
1	Han Jian	2 – 0 (15–4, 15–1)	Hamid Khan
2	Yang Yang	2 – 0 (15–4, 15–6)	Benson Wong
3	Xiong Guobao	2 – 0 (15–9, 15–1)	Wong Shoon Keat
4	Li Yongbo; Tian Bingyi	2 – 0 (15–4, 15–4)	Tan Eng Han; Tan Khee Wee
5	Ding Qiqing; Jiang Guoliang	2 – 0 (15–3, 15–4)	Benson Wong; Wong Shoon Soo

Malaysia
4
Nimibutr Stadium
22 February 1986

Thailand
1

		Result
1	Misbun Sidek	1 – 2 (16–17, 15–6, 16–17)	Sompol Kukasemkij
2	Ong Beng Teong	2 – 0 (15–3, 15–4)	Wichit Assavanapakas
3	Foo Kok Keong	2 – 0 (15–8, 15–10)	Kasemsak Chatujinda
4	Jalani Sidek; Razif Sidek	2 – 0 (15–1, 15–3)	Chaiwat Chalermphusitarak; Surachai Makkasasithorn
5	Ong Beng Teong; Rashid Sidek	2 – 0 (15–9, 15–7)	Sawei Chanseorasmee; Siripong Siripool

==== Third place ====
Thailand
2
Nimibutr Stadium
23 February 1986

Singapore
3

		Result
1	Sompol Kukasemkij	2 – 0 (15–6, 15–9)	Abdul Hamid Khan
2	Wichit Assavanapakas	0 – 2 (5–15, 13–15)	Lau Wing Cheok
3	Surachai Makkasasithorn	1 – 2 (16–18, 15–12, 4–15)	Wong Shoon Keat
4	Siripong Siripool; Chaiwat Chalermphusitarak	0 – 2 (8–15, 9–15)	Lau Wing Cheok; Abdul Hamid Khan
5	Sawei Chanseorasmee; Sarit Pisudchaikul	2 – 0 (15–9, 15–7)	Tan Eng Han; Tan Khee Wee

==== Final ====
China
4
Nimibutr Stadium
23 February 1986

Malaysia
1

		Result
1	Yang Yang	2 – 1 (11–15, 15–4, 17–16)	Misbun Sidek
2	Xiong Guobao	2 – 0 (15–6, 15–8)	Ong Beng Teong
3	Xu Biao	1 – 2 (15–7, 16–17, 4–15)	Foo Kok Keong
4	Li Yongbo; Tian Bingyi	2 – 0 (15–11, 15–10)	Jalani Sidek; Razif Sidek
5	Ding Qiqing; Jiang Guoliang	2 – 1 (17–18, 15–9, 15–12)	Ong Beng Teong; Rashid Sidek

== European Zone ==
The European qualifying rounds were held in Sporthalle Mülheim an der Ruhr in Mülheim, West Germany. Eighteen teams took part in the qualifiers with Mauritius, Mozambique and Switzerland making their debut in the competition. Nigeria withdrew from the tournament.

=== Group stage ===
==== Group A ====
Pos	Team	Pld	W	L	MF	MA	MD	Pts	Qualification
1	Denmark	3	3	0	15	0	+15	3	Advance to knockout stage
2	West Germany	3	2	1	10	5	+5	2	
3	Belgium	3	1	2	5	10	−5	1	
4	Mauritius	3	0	3	0	15	−15	0	

Source: New Sunday Times

Denmark
5
Sporthalle Mülheim an der Ruhr
19 February 1986

Mauritius
0

		Result
1	Morten Frost	2 – 0	Joseph Patrick Richard
2	Ib Frederiksen	2 – 0	Ravindren Sandrasagren
3	Torben Carlsen	2 – 0	Omar Bahemia
4	Steen Fladberg; Jesper Helledie	2 – 0	Jacques Foo Kune; Hervé Hardy
5	Mark Christiansen; Michael Kjeldsen	2 – 0	Joseph Patrick Richard; Philippe Lesage

West Germany
5
Sporthalle Mülheim an der Ruhr
19 February 1986

Belgium
0

		Result
1	Uwe Scherpen	2 – 0	Eddy van Herbruggen
2	Michael Ferlings	2 – 0	Jan de Mulder
3	Gerhard Treitinger	2 – 0	Christian Bene
4	Stefan Frey; Thomas Künstler	2 – 0	Jan de Mulder; José Isasi
5	Harald Klauer; Guido Schänzler	2 – 0	Michel Bauduin; Patrick de Ruisseau

West Germany
5
Sporthalle Mülheim an der Ruhr
20 February 1986

Mauritius
0

		Result
1	Uwe Scherpen	2 – 0	Joseph Patrick Richard
2	Michael Ferlings	2 – 0	Ravindren Sandrasagren
3	Gerhard Treitinger	2 – 0	Jacques Foo Kune
4	Stefan Frey; Thomas Künstler	2 – 0	Jacques Foo Kune; Hervé Hardy
5	Harald Klauer; Guido Schänzler	2 – 0	Joseph Patrick Richard; Philippe Lesage

Denmark
5
Sporthalle Mülheim an der Ruhr
20 February 1986

West Germany
0

		Result
1	Morten Frost	2 – 0 (15–1, 15–3)	Uwe Scherpen
2	Torben Carlsen	2 – 0 (15–10, 15–9)	Michael Ferlings
3	Michael Kjeldsen	2 – 0 (15–3, 15–11)	Gerhard Treitinger
4	Steen Fladberg; Jesper Helledie	2 – 0 (15–7, 15–3)	Thomas Künstler; Gerhard Treitinger
5	Mark Christiansen; Michael Kjeldsen	2 – 0 (15–11, 15–5)	Michael Ferlings; Ralf Rausch

Denmark
5
Sporthalle Mülheim an der Ruhr
21 February 1986

Belgium
0

		Result
1	Morten Frost	2 – 0 (15–1, 15–11)	Eddy van Herbruggen
2	Ib Frederiksen	2 – 0 (15–7, 15–8)	Christian Bene
3	Torben Carlsen	2 – 0 (15–1, 15–4)	Alain de Leeuw
4	Mark Christiansen; Michael Kjeldsen	2 – 0 (15–5, 15–11)	Eddy van Herbruggen; Christian Bene
5	Jesper Helledie; Jens Peter Nierhoff	2 – 0 (15–6, 15–11)	Yves de Negri; Dario van Nauw

Belgium
5
Sporthalle Mülheim an der Ruhr
21 February 1986

Mauritius
0

		Result
1	Eddy van Herbruggen	2 – 0	Joseph Patrick Richard
2	Jan de Mulder	2 – 0	Ravindren Sandrasagren
3	José Isasi	2 – 1	Philippe Lesage
4	Jan de Mulder; Eddy van Herbruggen	2 – 0	Jacques Foo Kune; Hervé Hardy
5	Michel Bauduin; Christian Bene	2 – 0	Joseph Patrick Richard; Omar Bahemia

==== Group B ====
Pos	Team	Pld	W	L	MF	MA	MD	Pts	Qualification
1	Sweden	4	4	0	20	0	+20	4	Advance to knockout stage
2	Austria	4	3	1	14	7	+7	3	
3	Iceland	4	2	2	11	9	+2	2	
4	France	4	1	3	5	15	−10	1	
5	Zambia	4	0	4	0	20	−20	0	

Source: New Sunday Times

Iceland
5
Sporthalle Mülheim an der Ruhr
19 February 1986

Zambia
0

		Result
1	Broddi Kristjánsson	2 – 0	Simon Gondwe
2	Þorsteinn Páll Hængsson	2 – 0	Majority Chola
3	Guðmundur Adolfsson	2 – 0	Bernard Chimfwembe
4	Sigfús Ægir Árnason; Jóhann Kjartansson	2 – 0	Abraham Mutale; Ramesh Patel
5	Árni Þór Hallgrímsson; Broddi Kristjánsson	2 – 0	Chenda Chilufya; Bernard Chimfwembe

Austria
5
Sporthalle Mülheim an der Ruhr
19 February 1986

France
0

		Result
1	Klaus Fischer	2 – 0	Benoît Pitte
2	Tariq Farooq	2 – 0	Christophe Jeanjean
3	Heinz Fischer	2 – 0	Hervé Maréchal
4	Gerald Hofegger; Johann Ratheyser	2 – 0	Christophe Jeanjean; Benoît Pitte
5	Heinz Fischer; Klaus Fischer	2 – 0	Jean-Claude Bertrand; Franck Panel

Sweden
5
Sporthalle Mülheim an der Ruhr
19 February 1986

Zambia
0

		Result
1	Ulf Johansson	2 – 0 (15–0, 15–0)	Simon Gondwe
2	Jan-Eric Antonsson	2 – 0 (15–2, 15–0)	Chenda Chilufya
3	Jonas Herrgårdh	2 – 0 (15–1, 15–1)	Bernard Chimfwembe
4	Stefan Karlsson; Thomas Kihlström	2 – 0 (15–2, 15–1)	Abraham Mutale; Ramesh Patel
5	Jan-Eric Antonsson; Pär-Gunnar Jönsson	2 – 0 (15–2, 15–2)	Chenda Chilufya; Bernard Chimfwembe

Austria
4
Sporthalle Mülheim an der Ruhr
19 February 1986

Iceland
1

		Result
1	Klaus Fischer	1 – 2	Broddi Kristjánsson
2	Tariq Farooq	2 – 0	Þorsteinn Páll Hængsson
3	Heinz Fischer	2 – 0	Guðmundur Adolfsson
4	Gerald Hofegger; Johann Ratheyser	2 – 1	Þorsteinn Páll Hængsson; Broddi Kristjánsson
5	Heinz Fischer; Klaus Fischer	2 – 0	Sigfús Ægir Árnason; Jóhann Kjartansson

France
5
Sporthalle Mülheim an der Ruhr
20 February 1986

Zambia
0

		Result
1	Benoît Pitte	2 – 0	Simon Gondwe
2	Christophe Jeanjean	2 – 0	Chenda Chilufya
3	Hervé Maréchal	2 – 0	Bernard Chimfwembe
4	Christophe Jeanjean; Benoît Pitte	2 – 0	Abraham Mutale; Ramesh Patel
5	Jean-Claude Bertrand; Franck Panel	2 – 0	Chenda Chilufya; Bernard Chimfwembe

Sweden
5
Sporthalle Mülheim an der Ruhr
20 February 1986

Iceland
0

		Result
1	Ulf Johansson	2 – 1	Broddi Kristjánsson
2	Jan-Eric Antonsson	2 – 0	Þorsteinn Páll Hængsson
3	Jonas Herrgårdh	2 – 0	Guðmundur Adolfsson
4	Stefan Karlsson; Thomas Kihlström	2 – 0	Þorsteinn Páll Hængsson; Broddi Kristjánsson
5	Jan-Eric Antonsson; Pär-Gunnar Jönsson	2 – 0	Sigfús Ægir Árnason; Jóhann Kjartansson

Sweden
5
Sporthalle Mülheim an der Ruhr
21 February 1986

France
0

		Result
1	Ulf Johansson	2 – 0 (15–8, 15–4)	Benoît Pitte
2	Jonas Herrgårdh	2 – 0 (15–5, 15–5)	Christophe Jeanjean
3	Stellan Österberg	2 – 0 (15–1, 15–10)	Hervé Maréchal
4	Stefan Karlsson; Thomas Kihlström	2 – 0 (15–6, 15–2)	Christophe Jeanjean; Benoît Pitte
5	Jan-Eric Antonsson; Pär-Gunnar Jönsson	2 – 0 (15–0, 15–6)	Jean-Claude Bertrand; Franck Panel

Austria
5
Sporthalle Mülheim an der Ruhr
21 February 1986

Zambia
0

		Result
1	Klaus Fischer	2 – 0	Simon Gondwe
2	Tariq Farooq	2 – 0	Chenda Chilufya
3	Heinz Fischer	2 – 0	Bernard Chimfwembe
4	Gerald Hofegger; Johann Ratheyser	2 – 0	Abraham Mutale; Ramesh Patel
5	Heinz Fischer; Klaus Fischer	2 – 0	Chenda Chilufya; Bernard Chimfwembe

Iceland
5
Sporthalle Mülheim an der Ruhr
21 February 1986

France
0

		Result
1	Broddi Kristjánsson	2 – 0	Benoît Pitte
2	Þorsteinn Páll Hængsson	2 – 1	Christophe Jeanjean
3	Guðmundur Adolfsson	2 – 1	Hervé Maréchal
4	Þorsteinn Páll Hængsson; Broddi Kristjánsson	2 – 1	Christophe Jeanjean; Benoît Pitte
5	Sigfús Ægir Árnason; Jóhann Kjartansson	2 – 1	Jean-Claude Bertrand; Franck Panel

Sweden
5
Sporthalle Mülheim an der Ruhr
21 February 1986

Austria
0

		Result
1	Ulf Johansson	2 – 0 (15–11, 15–7)	Klaus Fischer
2	Jan-Eric Antonsson	2 – 0 (15–0, 15–7)	Tariq Farooq
3	Jonas Herrgårdh	2 – 0 (15–0, 15–10)	Heinz Fischer
4	Stefan Karlsson; Thomas Kihlström	2 – 0 (15–7, 15–9)	Gerald Hofegger; Johann Ratheyser
5	Jan-Eric Antonsson; Ulf Johansson	2 – 0 (15–0, 15–6)	Heinz Fischer; Klaus Fischer

==== Group C ====
Pos	Team	Pld	W	L	MF	MA	MD	Pts	Qualification
1	Scotland	4	4	0	18	2	+16	4	Advance to knockout stage
2	Netherlands	4	3	1	17	3	+14	3	
3	Switzerland	4	2	2	14	6	+8	2	
4	Ireland	4	1	3	6	14	−8	1	
5	Mozambique	4	0	4	0	20	−20	0	

Source: New Sunday Times

Switzerland
5
Sporthalle Mülheim an der Ruhr
19 February 1986

Mozambique
0

		Result
1	Thomas Althaus	2 – 0	Sozinho Guerra
2	Pascal Kaul	2 – 0	Luís Antonio Timm
3	Daniel Hänggi	2 – 0	Luís Filipe
4	Michael Althaus; Thomas Althaus	2 – 0	Sozinho Guerra; Luís Antonio Timm
5	Werner Riesen; Jorgen van der Pot	2 – 0	Arnaldo Bongo; Luís Filipe

Netherlands
5
Sporthalle Mülheim an der Ruhr
19 February 1986

Ireland
0

		Result
1	Lex Coene	2 – 0 (15–6, 15–3)	Pat Marron
2	Pierre Pelupessy	2 – 0 (15–7, 15–7)	John Taylor
3	Alex Meijer	2 – 1 (15–8, 16–17, 15–12)	Rikki Keag
4	Pierre Pelupessy; Bas von Barnau Sijthoff	2 – 0 (15–8, 15–7)	Rikki Keag; John Taylor
5	Rob Ridder; Uun Santosa	2 – 1 (15–1, 6–15, 15–5)	Pat Marron; Mark Peard

Scotland
5
Sporthalle Mülheim an der Ruhr
19 February 1986

Mozambique
0

		Result
1	Alex White	2 – 0 (15–0, 15–1)	Sozinho Guerra
2	Kenny Middlemiss	2 – 0 (15–1, 15–3)	Luís Antonio Timm
3	Iain Pringle	2 – 0 (15–1, 15–2)	Luís Filipe
4	Billy Gilliland; Dan Travers	2 – 0 (15–3, 15–0)	Sozinho Guerra; Luís Antonio Timm
5	David Shaylor; Alex White	2 – 0 (15–0, 15–0)	Arnaldo Bongo; Luís Filipe

Netherlands
5
Sporthalle Mülheim an der Ruhr
19 February 1986

Switzerland
0

		Result
1	Lex Coene	2 – 0 (15–13, 15–7)	Thomas Althaus
2	Pierre Pelupessy	2 – 1 (9–15, 15–7, 15–0)	Jorgen van der Pot
3	Alex Meijer	2 – 0 (15–10, 15–13)	Pascal Kaul
4	Pierre Pelupessy; Bas von Barnau Sijthoff	2 – 0 (15–8, 15–5)	Michael Althaus; Thomas Althaus
5	Rob Ridder; Uun Santosa	2 – 0 (15–0, 15–5)	Daniel Hänggi; Pascal Kaul

Ireland
5
Sporthalle Mülheim an der Ruhr
20 February 1986

Mozambique
0

		Result
1	Pat Marron	2 – 0	Sozinho Guerra
2	John Taylor	2 – 0	Luís Antonio Timm
3	Rikki Keag	2 – 0	Luís Filipe
4	Rikki Keag; John Taylor	2 – 0	Sozinho Guerra; Luís Antonio Timm
5	Pat Marron; Mark Peard	2 – 0	Arnaldo Bongo; Luís Filipe

Scotland
5
Sporthalle Mülheim an der Ruhr
20 February 1986

Switzerland
0

		Result
1	Alex White	2 – 0 (15–3, 15–3)	Thomas Althaus
2	Dan Travers	2 – 0 (15–4, 15–7)	Pascal Kaul
3	Kenny Middlemiss	2 – 0 (15–2, 15–4)	Daniel Hänggi
4	Billy Gilliland; Dan Travers	2 – 0 (15–5, 15–2)	Michael Althaus; Thomas Althaus
5	Iain Pringle; David Shaylor	2 – 0 (15–9, 15–3)	Werner Riesen; Jorgen van der Pot

Netherlands
5
Sporthalle Mülheim an der Ruhr
21 February 1986

Mozambique
0

		Result
1	Pierre Pelupessy	2 – 0 (15–5, 15–6)	Sozinho Guerra
2	Alex Meijer	2 – 0 (15–7, 15–4)	Luís Antonio Timm
3	Bas von Barnau Sijthoff	2 – 0 (15–3, 15–4)	Luís Filipe
4	Rob Ridder; Uun Santosa	2 – 0 (15–4, 15–8)	Sozinho Guerra; Luís Antonio Timm
5	Alex Meijer; Bas von Barnau Sijthoff	2 – 0 (15–4, 15–4)	Arnaldo Bongo; Luís Filipe

Scotland
5
Sporthalle Mülheim an der Ruhr
21 February 1986

Ireland
0

		Result
1	Dan Travers	2 – 0 (15–4, 15–7)	Pat Marron
2	Kenny Middlemiss	2 – 0 (15–6, 15–1)	Robert Taylor
3	Billy Gilliland	2 – 0 (15–6, 15–2)	Mark Peard
4	Iain Pringle; Alex White	2 – 0 (15–11, 15–8)	Rikki Keag; John Taylor
5	Billy Gilliland; David Shaylor	2 – 0 (15–3, 15–2)	Pat Marron; Mark Peard

Scotland
3
Sporthalle Mülheim an der Ruhr
21 February 1986

Netherlands
2

		Result
1	Alex White	2 – 0 (15–2, 15–2)	Lex Coene
2	Dan Travers	0 – 2 (6–15, 7–15)	Pierre Pelupessy
3	Kenny Middlemiss	1 – 2 (17–15, 15–17, 11–15)	Uun Santosa
4	Billy Gilliland; Dan Travers	2 – 0 (15–5, 15–4)	Uun Santosa; Bas von Barnau Sijthoff
5	Iain Pringle; Alex White	2 – 0 (18–14, 15–3)	Pierre Pelupessy; Rob Ridder

Ireland
1
Sporthalle Mülheim an der Ruhr
21 February 1986

Switzerland
4

		Result
1	Pat Marron	2 – 1	Thomas Althaus
2	John Taylor	1 – 2	Jorgen van der Pot
3	Rikki Keag	0 – 2	Pascal Kaul
4	Rikki Keag; John Taylor	1 – 2	Michael Althaus; Thomas Althaus
5	Pat Marron; Mark Peard	1 – 2	Werner Riesen; Jorgen van der Pot

==== Group D ====
Pos	Team	Pld	W	L	MF	MA	MD	Pts	Qualification
1	England	3	3	0	14	1	+13	3	Advance to knockout stage
2	Wales	3	2	1	10	6	+4	2	
3	Finland	3	1	2	6	9	−3	1	
4	Norway	3	0	3	1	15	−14	0	
5	Nigeria	0	0	0	0	0	0	0	Withdrew

Source: New Sunday Times

Wales
5
Sporthalle Mülheim an der Ruhr
19 February 1986

Norway
0

		Result
1	Philip Sutton	2 – 1	Øyvind Berntsen
2	Chris Rees	2 – 0	Erik Lia
3	Andrew Spencer	2 – 0	Espen Larsen
4	Chris Rees; Lyndon Williams	2 – 0	Øyvind Berntsen; Roar Kaupang
5	Andrew Spencer; Philip Sutton	2 – 0	Jørn Myrestrand; Hans Sperre Jr.

Wales
4
Sporthalle Mülheim an der Ruhr
19 February 1986

Finland
1

		Result
1	Philip Sutton	0 – 2 (11–15, 10–15)	Tony Tuominen
2	Chris Rees	2 – 0 (18–13, 15–5)	Heikki Holvikari
3	Barry Burns	2 – 1 (12–15, 17–16, 15–7)	Lasse Lindelöf
4	Chris Rees; Lyndon Williams	2 – 0 (15–5, 15–5)	Mika Heinonen; Tony Tuominen
5	Andrew Spencer; Philip Sutton	2 – 0 (15–2, 15–3)	Heikki Holvikari; Thomas Westerholm

England
5
Sporthalle Mülheim an der Ruhr
20 February 1986

Finland
0

		Result
1	Nick Yates	2 – 0 (15–4, 15–0)	Tony Tuominen
2	Steve Butler	2 – 0 (15–1, 15–4)	Mika Heinonen
3	Darren Hall	2 – 0 (15–3, 15–7)	Lasse Lindelöf
4	Andy Goode; Nigel Tier	2 – 0 (15–8, 15–10)	Mika Heinonen; Tony Tuominen
5	Chris Dobson; Dipak Tailor	2 – 0 (15–4, 15–6)	Heikki Holvikari; Thomas Westerholm

England
5
Sporthalle Mülheim an der Ruhr
20 February 1986

Norway
0

		Result
1	Nick Yates	2 – 0 (15–1, 15–0)	Øyvind Berntsen
2	Steve Butler	2 – 0 (15–7, 15–5)	Erik Lia
3	Darren Hall	2 – 0 (15–3, 15–0)	Espen Larsen
4	Andy Goode; Nigel Tier	2 – 0 (15–13, 15–9)	Øyvind Berntsen; Roar Kaupang
5	Darren Hall; Dipak Tailor	2 – 0 (15–7, 15–2)	Erik Lia; Jørn Myrestrand

England
5
Sporthalle Mülheim an der Ruhr
21 February 1986

Wales
0

		Result
1	Nick Yates	2 – 0	Philip Sutton
2	Steve Butler	2 – 0	Chris Rees
3	Darren Hall	2 – 0	Giles Pierce
4	Andy Goode; Nigel Tier	2 – 1	Chris Rees; Lyndon Williams
5	Chris Dobson; Dipak Tailor	2 – 0	Andrew Spencer; Philip Sutton

Finland
4
Sporthalle Mülheim an der Ruhr
21 February 1986

Norway
1

		Result
1	Tony Tuominen	2 – 0	Øyvind Berntsen
2	Mika Heinonen	1 – 2	Erik Lia
3	Lasse Lindelöf	2 – 0	Espen Larsen
4	Tony Tuominen; Mika Heinonen	2 – 1	Øyvind Berntsen; Roar Kaupang
5	Heikki Holvikari; Thomas Westerholm	2 – 1	Erik Lia; Jørn Myrestrand

=== Knockout stage ===
Semi-finals
Denmark	5
Sweden	0
Scotland	1
England	4

Final
Denmark	5
England	0
Third place
Sweden	4
Scotland	1

==== Semi-finals ====
Denmark
5
Sporthalle Mülheim an der Ruhr
22 February 1986

Sweden
0

		Result
1	Morten Frost	2 – 0 (15–5, 15–1)	Ulf Johansson
2	Ib Frederiksen	2 – 0 (15–12, 18–15)	Jan-Eric Antonsson
3	Torben Carlsen	2 – 0 (15–8, 15–9)	Jonas Herrgårdh
4	Steen Fladberg; Jesper Helledie	2 – 0 (15–7, 18–13)	Stefan Karlsson; Thomas Kihlström
5	Mark Christiansen; Michael Kjeldsen	2 – 0 (15–13, 15–7)	Jan-Eric Antonsson; Pär-Gunnar Jönsson

England
4
Sporthalle Mülheim an der Ruhr
22 February 1986

Scotland
1

		Result
1	Nick Yates	2 – 0	Alex White
2	Steve Butler	2 – 0	Dan Travers
3	Darren Hall	2 – 0	Kenny Middlemiss
4	Andy Goode; Nigel Tier	1 – 2	Billy Gilliland; Dan Travers
5	Chris Dobson; Dipak Tailor	2 – 0	Iain Pringle; David Shaylor

==== Third place ====
Sweden
4
Sporthalle Mülheim an der Ruhr
23 February 1986

Scotland
1

		Result
1	Ulf Johansson	2 – 0 (15–10, 15–5)	Alex White
2	Jan-Eric Antonsson	2 – 0 (15–7, 15–8)	Dan Travers
3	Jonas Herrgårdh	1 – 2 (6–15, 15–12, 11–15)	Kenny Middlemiss
4	Stefan Karlsson; Thomas Kihlström	2 – 1 (15–8, 11–15, 15–7)	Billy Gilliland; Dan Travers
5	Jan-Eric Antonsson; Pär-Gunnar Jönsson	2 – 1 (6–15, 15–8, 15–2)	Iain Pringle; Alex White

==== Final ====
Denmark
5
Sporthalle Mülheim an der Ruhr
23 February 1986

England
0

		Result
1	Morten Frost	2 – 0 (15–12, 15–5)	Nick Yates
2	Ib Frederiksen	2 – 0 (15–4, 15–5)	Steve Butler
3	Michael Kjeldsen	2 – 0 (18–14, 18–14)	Darren Hall
4	Steen Fladberg; Jesper Helledie	2 – 0 (15–8, 15–3)	Chris Dobson; Dipak Tailor
5	Mark Christiansen; Michael Kjeldsen	2 – 1 (15–7, 12–15, 15–5)	Steve Baddeley; Andy Goode

== Pan American Zone ==
The qualifying rounds for the Pan American zone were held at the Vancouver Racquets Club in Vancouver, Canada. Nine teams competed in qualifying for the final tournament.

=== Group stage ===
==== Group A ====
Pos	Team	Pld	W	L	MF	MA	MD	Pts	Qualification
1	South Korea	3	3	0	14	1	+13	3	Advance to knockout stage
2	Canada	3	2	1	10	5	+5	2	Advance to knockout stage
3	United States	3	1	2	6	10	−4	1	
4	Mexico	3	0	3	0	14	−14	0	

Source: The Straits Times

Canada
5
Vancouver Racquets Club
19 February 1986

Mexico
0

		Result
1	Mike Butler	2 – 0 (15–4, 15–4)	Fernando de la Torre
2	John Goss	2 – 0 (15–10, 15–12)	Eugenio Tapia
3	Ken Poole	2 – 0 (15–6, 15–4)	Ernesto de la Torre
4	Ian Johnston; Steve Johnston	2 – 0 (15–4, 15–2)	Juan Carlos García; Gerardo Cedillo
5	Mike Bitten; Mike deBelle	2 – 0 (15–4, 15–9)	Ernesto de la Torre; Fernando de la Torre

South Korea
5
Vancouver Racquets Club
19 February 1986

Canada
0

		Result
1	Park Joo-bong	2 – 1 (15–8, 14–17, 15–1)	Mike Butler
2	Choi Byung-hak	2 – 0 (15–3, 15–13)	John Goss
3	Sung Han-kook	2 – 0 (15–7, 15–5)	Jamie Marks
4	Kim Moon-soo; Park Joo-bong	2 – 0 (15–2, 15–5)	Mike Bitten; Mike deBelle
5	Kim Joong-soo; Lee Deuk-choon	2 – 0 (18–15, 17–15)	Ken Poole; Mike Butler

United States
5
Vancouver Racquets Club
19 February 1986

Mexico
0

		Result
1	Chris Jogis	2 – 1 (15–4, 16–18, 15–8)	Fernando de la Torre
2	Tony Alston	2 – 0 (15–10, 15–7)	Eugenio Tapia
3	Sanjay Malde	2 – 1 (10–15, 17–16, 15–4)	Ernesto de la Torre
4	John Britton; Mike Walker	2 – 0 (15–2, 15–1)	Juan Carlos García; Gerardo Cedillo
5	Mathew Fogarty; Bruce Pontow	2 – 0 (18–17, 15–2)	Ernesto de la Torre; Fernando de la Torre

South Korea
5
Vancouver Racquets Club
20 February 1986

Mexico
0

		Result
1	Choi Byung-hak	2 – 0 (15–4, 15–6)	Fernando de la Torre
2	Lee Deuk-choon	2 – 0 (15–4, 15–4)	Ernesto de la Torre
3	Shon Jin-hwan	2 – 0 (15–3, 15–0)	Gerardo Cedillo
4	Kim Joong-soo; Lee Deuk-choon	2 – 0 (15–2, 15–2)	Ernesto de la Torre; Fernando de la Torre
5	Park Sung-bae; Shon Jin-hwan	2 – 0 (15–0, 15–0)	Juan Carlos García; Gerardo Cedillo

South Korea
4
Vancouver Racquets Club
20 February 1986

United States
1

		Result
1	Park Joo-bong	2 – 0 (15–4, 15–1)	Chris Jogis
2	Park Sung-bae	2 – 0 (15–4, 15–1)	Tony Alston
3	Sung Han-kook	2 – 0 (15–1, 15–0)	Sanjay Malde
4	Kim Moon-soo; Lee Deuk-choon	0 – 2 (12–15, 12–15)	Mathew Fogarty; Bruce Pontow
5	Kim Joong-soo; Shon Jin-hwan	2 – 0 (15–9, 15–3)	John Britton; Mike Walker

Canada
5
Vancouver Racquets Club
21 February 1986

United States
0

		Result
1	Mike Butler	2 – 0 (15–5, 15–9)	Chris Jogis
2	John Goss	2 – 0 (15–5, 15–3)	Tony Alston
3	Ken Poole	2 – 0 (17–15, 15–9)	Guy Chadwick
4	Mike Bitten; Mike deBelle	2 – 0 (15–7, 15–12)	Mathew Fogarty; Bruce Pontow
5	Mike Butler; Ken Poole	2 – 0 (15–3, 15–8)	John Britton; Mike Walker

==== Group B ====
Pos	Team	Pld	W	L	MF	MA	MD	Pts	Qualification
1	Japan	4	4	0	19	1	+18	4	Advance to knockout stage
2	New Zealand	4	3	1	12	8	+4	3	Advance to knockout stage
3	Chinese Taipei	4	2	2	12	8	+4	2	
4	Peru	4	1	3	7	13	−6	1	
5	Jamaica	4	0	4	0	20	−20	0	

Source: The Straits Times

Peru
5
Vancouver Racquets Club
19 February 1986

Jamaica
0

		Result
1	Gustavo Salazar	2 – 0 (15–8, 15–6)	Robert Richards
2	Federico Valdez	2 – 0 (15–4, 15–5)	George Hugh
3	Alfredo Salazar	2 – 0 (15–8, 15–11)	Garth King
4	Gustavo Salazar; Federico Valdez	2 – 0 (15–5, 15–12)	George Hugh; Tommy Lee
5	Alfredo Salazar; Germán Valdez	2 – 0 (15–5, 15–3)	Sammy Leyow; Robert Richards

Japan
4
Vancouver Racquets Club
19 February 1986

Chinese Taipei
1

		Result
1	Hiroshi Nishiyama	2 – 0 (18–15, 15–5)	Chang Wen-sung
2	Shinji Matsuura	2 – 1 (13–15, 15–10, 17–15)	Chen Neng-piao
3	Tetsuaki Inoue	0 – 2 (12–15, 11–15)	Gan Rong-yih
4	Shuji Matsuno; Shinji Matsuura	2 – 0 (15–4, 15–5)	Chung Chia-jen; Gan Rong-yih
5	Tetsuaki Inoue; Shōkichi Miyamori	2 – 1 (13–15, 15–7, 15–9)	Lin Hsueh-hsin; Lin Yuan-dien

New Zealand
3
Vancouver Racquets Club
19 February 1986

Chinese Taipei
2

		Result
1	Graeme Robson	0 – 2 (11–15, 4–15)	Chang Wen-sung
2	Kerrin Harrison	2 – 1 (15–10, 9–15, 15–5)	Chen Neng-piao
3	Glenn Stewart	1 – 2 (6–15, 15–11, 5–15)	Gan Rong-yih
4	Stephen Lobb; Jacob van Selm	2 – 1 (17–14, 9–15, 15–12)	Lin Hsueh-hsin; Lin Yuan-dien
5	Graeme Robson; Kerrin Harrison	2 – 1 (15–7, 13–18, 15–8)	Chung Chia-jen; Gan Rong-yih

Japan
5
Vancouver Racquets Club
19 February 1986

Jamaica
0

		Result
1	Hiroshi Nishiyama	2 – 0 (15–3, 15–3)	Robert Richards
2	Shinji Matsuura	2 – 0 (15–7, 15–5)	George Hugh
3	Shuji Matsuno	2 – 0 (15–0, 15–6)	Garth King
4	Tetsuaki Inoue; Shōkichi Miyamori	2 – 0 (15–3, 15–6)	Robert Richards; Sammy Leyow
5	Shuji Matsuno; Shinji Matsuura	2 – 0 (15–3, 15–5)	George Hugh; Tommy Lee

New Zealand
4
Vancouver Racquets Club
20 February 1986

Peru
1

		Result
1	Graeme Robson	2 – 0 (15–5, 15–9)	Gustavo Salazar
2	Kerrin Harrison	2 – 0 (15–8, 15–2)	Federico Valdez
3	Glenn Stewart	2 – 0 (17–15, 15–12)	Alfredo Salazar
4	Graeme Robson; Kerrin Harrison	0 – 2 (1–15, 7–15)	Gustavo Salazar; Federico Valdez
5	Stephen Lobb; Jacob van Selm	2 – 0 (15–7, 15–1)	Alfredo Salazar; Germán Valdez

Japan
5
Vancouver Racquets Club
20 February 1986

Peru
0

		Result
1	Hiroshi Nishiyama	2 – 0 (15–9, 15–4)	Gustavo Salazar
2	Tetsuaki Inoue	2 – 0 (15–8, 15–5)	Germán Valdez
3	Shuji Matsuno	2 – 0 (15–3, 15–2)	José Iturriaga
4	Shuji Matsuno; Shinji Matsuura	2 – 1 (12–15, 15–3, 15–9)	Gustavo Salazar; Federico Valdez
5	Tetsuaki Inoue; Shōkichi Miyamori	2 – 0 (15–7, 15–8)	José Iturriaga; Germán Valdez

New Zealand
5
Vancouver Racquets Club
20 February 1986

Jamaica
0

		Result
1	Graeme Robson	2 – 0 (15–7, 15–4)	Robert Richards
2	Glenn Stewart	2 – 0 (15–8, 15–9)	George Hugh
3	Jacob van Selm	2 – 0 (15–6, 15–5)	Garth King
4	Graeme Robson; Kerrin Harrison	2 – 0 (15–3, 15–9)	George Hugh; Tommy Lee
5	Jacob van Selm; Stephen Lobb	2 – 0 (15–3, 15–4)	Robert Richards; Sammy Leyow

Chinese Taipei
4
Vancouver Racquets Club
21 February 1986

Peru
1

		Result
1	Chang Wen-sung	2 – 0 (15–11, 15–11)	Gustavo Salazar
2	Chen Neng-piao	2 – 0 (15–4, 15–12)	Federico Valdez
3	Gan Rong-yih	2 – 0 (15–4, 15–11)	Alfredo Salazar
4	Gan Rong-yih; Chung Chia-jen	0 – 2 (14–17, 6–15)	Gustavo Salazar; Federico Valdez
5	Lin Hsueh-hsin; Lin Yuan-dien	2 – 0 (15–3, 15–3)	Alfredo Salazar; Germán Valdez

Japan
5
Vancouver Racquets Club
21 February 1986

New Zealand
0

		Result
1	Hiroshi Nishiyama	2 – 1 (15–9, 10–15, 15–4)	Graeme Robson
2	Shuji Matsuno	2 – 0 (18–14, 15–7)	Kerrin Harrison
3	Tetsuaki Inoue	2 – 0 (15–2, 15–7)	Glenn Stewart
4	Shuji Matsuno; Shinji Matsuura	2 – 0 (15–11, 15–6)	Graeme Robson; Kerrin Harrison
5	Tetsuaki Inoue; Shōkichi Miyamori	2 – 0 (15–7, 15–9)	Stephen Lobb; Jacob van Selm

Chinese Taipei
5
Vancouver Racquets Club
21 February 1986

Jamaica
0

		Result
1	Chang Wen-sung	2 – 0 (15–8, 15–3)	Robert Richards
2	Chen Neng-piao	2 – 0 (15–0, 15–0)	George Hugh
3	Gan Rong-yih	2 – 0 (15–1, 15–2)	Tommy Lee
4	Lin Hsueh-hsin; Lin Yuan-dien	2 – 0 (15–8, 15–7)	Garth King; Sammy Leyow
5	Gan Rong-yih; Chung Chia-jen	2 – 0 (15–5, 15–6)	Robert Richards; Tommy Lee

=== Knockout stage ===
Semi-finals
South Korea	5
New Zealand	0
Canada	1
Japan	4

Final
South Korea	4
Japan	1
Third place
New Zealand	2
Canada	3

==== Semi-finals ====
South Korea
5
Vancouver Racquets Club
22 February 1986

New Zealand
0

		Result
1	Park Joo-bong	2 – 0 (15–5, 15–3)	Glenn Stewart
2	Park Sung-bae	2 – 0 (15–4, 15–1)	Jacob van Selm
3	Sung Han-kook	2 – 0 (15–2, 15–1)	Stephen Lobb
4	Kim Joong-soo; Lee Deuk-choon	2 – 0 (15–4, 15–3)	Graeme Robson; Kerrin Harrison
5	Park Sung-bae; Shon Jin-hwan	2 – 0 (15–1, 15–2)	Stephen Lobb; Jacob van Selm

Japan
4
Vancouver Racquets Club
22 February 1986

Canada
1

		Result
1	Hiroshi Nishiyama	0 – 2 (5–15, 9–15)	Mike Butler
2	Shinji Matsuura	2 – 0 (15–9, 15–9)	John Goss
3	Tetsuaki Inoue	2 – 0 (15–8, 15–6)	Ken Poole
4	Shuji Matsuno; Shinji Matsuura	1 – 0^{r} (15–6, 5–0)	Mike Bitten; Mike deBelle
5	Tetsuaki Inoue; Shōkichi Miyamori	2 – 0 (15–11, 15–8)	Ian Johnston; Steve Johnston

==== Third place ====
New Zealand
2
Vancouver Racquets Club
22 February 1986

Canada
3

		Result
1	Graeme Robson	0 – 2 (15–11, 2–15, 4–15)	Mike Butler
2	Kerrin Harrison	0 – 2 (6–15, 4–15)	John Goss
3	Glenn Stewart	2 – 0 (15–9, 15–10)	Jamie Marks
4	Graeme Robson; Kerrin Harrison	2 – 0 (15–11, 15–7)	Mike Bitten; Mike deBelle
5	Stephen Lobb; Jacob van Selm	0 – 2 (8–15, 4–15)	Mike Butler; Ken Poole

==== Final ====
South Korea
4
Vancouver Racquets Club
22 February 1986

Japan
1

		Result
1	Park Joo-bong	2 – 0 (15–5, 15–10)	Hiroshi Nishiyama
2	Choi Byung-hak	0 – 2 (12–15, 10–15)	Shinji Matsuura
3	Sung Han-kook	2 – 0 (15–5, 15–6)	Tetsuaki Inoue
4	Kim Moon-soo; Park Joo-bong	2 – 0 (15–0, 15–6)	Shuji Matsuno; Shinji Matsuura
5	Lee Deuk-choon; Sung Han-kook	2 – 0 (15–4, 15–7)	Tetsuaki Inoue; Shōkichi Miyamori
