= 1984 Thomas Cup qualification =

Tournament details
- Dates: 20 – 26 February 1984
- Location: Asian zone: Hong Kong; New Delhi American zone: Toronto European zone: Ostend

The qualifying process for the 1984 Thomas Cup took place from 20 to 26 February 1984 to decide the final teams which will play in the final tournament.

== Qualification process ==
Starting from 1984, the qualification process will be divided into three regions, the Asian Zone, the European Zone and the Pan American Zone. The Asian Zone is subdivided into two subzones, the West and the East. Teams in their respective zone will first compete in a round-robin elimination format. The top two teams will advance to the knockout stages to compete for a place in the final tournament to be held in Kuala Lumpur.

China qualified for the final tournament as defending champions while Malaysia qualified as hosts.

=== Qualified teams ===
Country	Qualified as	Qualified on	Final appearance
Malaysia	1984 Thomas Cup hosts	8 March 1983	10th
China	1982 Thomas Cup winners	21 May 1982	2nd
South Korea	West Asian Zone winners	26 February 1984	1st
Indonesia	East Asian Zone winners	25 February 1984	10th
Denmark	European Zone winners	26 February 1984	13th
England	European Zone runners-up	26 February 1984	2nd
Sweden	Third place in European Zone	26 February 1984	1st
Japan	American Zone winners	25 February 1984	5th

== Asian Zone (West) ==
The qualification rounds for the West Asian Zone were held from 22 to 26 February at the Indraprashtha Indoor Stadium in New Delhi, India. Originally, six teams took part in qualifying for the final tournament. Burma withdrew from the competition.

=== Group stage ===
==== Group A ====
Pos	Team	Pld	W	L	MF	MA	MD	Pts	Qualification
1	South Korea	2	2	0	10	0	+10	2	Advance to knockout stage
2	Thailand	2	1	1	5	5	0	1	Advance to knockout stage
3	Nepal	2	0	2	0	10	−10	0	

Source: Singapore Monitor

South Korea
5
Indraprashtha Indoor Stadium
22 February 1984

Nepal
0

			1	2	3
1	(South Korea) (Nepal)	Park Joo-bong; Prakash Rana	15; 9	15; 2
2	(South Korea) (Nepal)	Sung Han-kook; Pratap Adhikari	15; 9	15; 0
3	(South Korea) (Nepal)	Choi Byung-hak; Chandra Krishnan	15; 2	15; 1
4	(South Korea) (Nepal)	Kim Byung-sik / Lee Deuk-choon; Pratap Adhikari / Naresh Bahadur Singh	15; 2	15; 3
5	(South Korea) (Nepal)	Lee Eun-ku / Park Joo-bong; Chandra Krishnan / Prakash Rana	15; 1	15; 5

Thailand
0
Indraprashtha Indoor Stadium
23 February 1984

South Korea
5

			1	2	3
1	(Thailand) (South Korea)	Sompol Kukasemkij; Park Joo-bong	11; 15	6; 15
2	(Thailand) (South Korea)	Somchai Leea Nansaksiri; Sung Han-kook	4; 15	5; 15
3	(Thailand) (South Korea)	Wichit Assavanapakas; Choi Byung-hak	5; 15	11; 15
4	(Thailand) (South Korea)	Chaiwat Chalermphusitarak / Surachai Makkasasithorn; Kim Moon-soo / Park Joo-bong	1; 15	1; 15
5	(Thailand) (South Korea)	Wichit Assavanapakas / Somchai Leea Nansaksiri; Kim Byung-sik / Lee Deuk-choon	10; 15	15; 12	8; 15

Thailand
5
Indraprashtha Indoor Stadium
24 February 1984

Nepal
0

			1	2	3
1	(Thailand) (Nepal)	Sompol Kukasemkij; Prakash Rana	15; 7	15; 8
2	(Thailand) (Nepal)	Udom Luangpetcharaporn; Pratap Adhikari	15; 6	15; 9
3	(Thailand) (Nepal)	Wichit Assavanapakas; Naresh Bahadur Singh	15; 7	15; 4
4	(Thailand) (Nepal)	Wichit Assavanapakas / Somchai Leea Nansaksiri; Pratap Adhikari / Prakash Rana	15; 8	15; 5
5	(Thailand) (Nepal)	Surachai Makkasasithorn / Songchai Pandsathitwong; Ramji Bahadur Shrestha / Naresh Bahadur Singh	15; 1	15; 9

==== Group B ====
Pos	Team	Pld	W	L	MF	MA	MD	Pts	Qualification
1	India	1	1	0	5	0	+5	1	Advance to knockout stage
2	Sri Lanka	1	0	1	0	5	−5	0	Advance to knockout stage
3	Burma	0	0	0	0	0	0	0	Withdrew

Source: Singapore Monitor

India
5
Indraprashtha Indoor Stadium
24 February 1984

Sri Lanka
0

			1	2	3
1	(India) (Sri Lanka)	Prakash Padukone; Niroshan Wijekoon	15; 1	15; 8
2	(India) (Sri Lanka)	Syed Modi; Priyantha Wijesekera	15; 1	15; 7
3	(India) (Sri Lanka)	Sanjay Sharma; Udaya Weerakoon	15; 6	15; 3
4	(India) (Sri Lanka)	Leroy D'Sa / Sanat Misra; Ranjith Weerasinghe / Niranjan Wijesekera	15; 4	15; 3
5	(India) (Sri Lanka)	Partho Ganguli / Vikram Singh; Niroshan Wijekoon / Priyantha Wijesekera	15; 10	15; 3

=== Knockout stage ===
Semi-finals
South Korea	5
Sri Lanka	0
Thailand	1
India	4

Final
South Korea	4
India	1
Third place
Sri Lanka	0
Thailand	5

==== Semi-finals ====
South Korea
5
Indraprashtha Indoor Stadium
25 February 1984

Sri Lanka
0

			1	2	3
1	(South Korea) (Sri Lanka)	Choi Byung-hak; Niroshan Wijekoon	15; 9	15; 12
2	(South Korea) (Sri Lanka)	Lee Deuk-choon; Udaya Weerakoon	15; 5	15; 1
3	(South Korea) (Sri Lanka)	Kim Byung-sik; Ranjith Weerasinghe	15; 5	15; 12
4	(South Korea) (Sri Lanka)	Lee Eun-ku / Park Joo-bong; Ranjith Weerasinghe / Niranjan Wijesekera	15; 1	15; 1
5	(South Korea) (Sri Lanka)	Kim Moon-soo / Lee Deuk-choon; Niroshan Wijekoon / Priyantha Wijesekera	15; 7	15; 2

Thailand
1
Indraprashtha Indoor Stadium
25 February 1984

India
4

			1	2	3
1	(Thailand) (India)	Sompol Kukasemkij; Prakash Padukone	3; 15	7; 15
2	(Thailand) (India)	Udom Luangpetcharaporn; Syed Modi	13; 15	8; 15
3	(Thailand) (India)	Wichit Assavanapakas; Sanjay Sharma	2; 15	4; 15
4	(Thailand) (India)	Wichit Assavanapakas / Somchai Leea Nansaksiri; Leroy D'Sa / Pradeep Gandhe	5; 15	5; 15
5	(Thailand) (India)	Surachai Makkasasithorn / Songchai Pandsathitwong; Partho Ganguli / Vikram Singh	16; 18	15; 3	15; 13

==== Third place ====
Thailand
5
Indraprashtha Indoor Stadium
26 February 1984

Sri Lanka
0

			1	2	3
1	(Thailand) (Sri Lanka)	Sompol Kukasemkij; Niroshan Wijekoon	15; 11	15; 6
2	(Thailand) (Sri Lanka)	Udom Luangpetcharaporn; Udaya Weerakoon	15; 2	15; 3
3	(Thailand) (Sri Lanka)	Wichit Assavanapakas; Priyantha Wijesekera	15; 5	15; 6
4	(Thailand) (Sri Lanka)	Wichit Assavanapakas / Somchai Leea Nansaksiri; Niroshan Wijekoon / Priyantha Wijesekera	15; 1	15; 7
5	(Thailand) (Sri Lanka)	Surachai Makkasasithorn / Songchai Pandsathitwong; Ranjith Weerasinghe / Niranjan Wijesekera	15; 3	15; 6

==== Final ====
India
1
Indraprashtha Indoor Stadium
26 February 1984

South Korea
4

			1	2	3
1	(India) (South Korea)	Prakash Padukone; Park Joo-bong	15; 3	15; 9
2	(India) (South Korea)	Syed Modi; Sung Han-kook	10; 15	5; 15
3	(India) (South Korea)	Sanjay Sharma; Lee Deuk-choon	5; 15	11; 15
4	(India) (South Korea)	Leroy D'Sa / Sanat Misra; Lee Eun-ku / Park Joo-bong	13; 15	5; 15
5	(India) (South Korea)	Prakash Padukone / Uday Pawar; Kim Moon-soo / Lee Deuk-choon	10; 15	13; 15

== Asian Zone (East) ==
The East Asian zone qualifying rounds were held from 20 to 25 February at the Queen Elizabeth Stadium in Hong Kong. Seven teams took part in qualifying with the Philippines making their first ever appearance in qualifying for the Thomas Cup.

=== Group stage ===
==== Group A ====
Pos	Team	Pld	W	L	MF	MA	MD	Pts	Qualification
1	Hong Kong	3	3	0	11	4	+7	3	Advance to knockout stage
2	Australia	3	2	1	10	5	+5	2	Advance to knockout stage
3	Singapore	3	1	2	9	6	+3	1	
4	Philippines	3	0	3	0	15	−15	0	

Source: Singapore Monitor

Hong Kong
3
Queen Elizabeth Stadium
20 February 1984

Singapore
2

			1	2	3
1	(Hong Kong) (Singapore)	Sze Yu; Wong Shoon Keat	15; 9	15; 10
2	(Hong Kong) (Singapore)	Chan Chi Choi; Lau Wing Cheok	4; 15	15; 10	15; 5
3	(Hong Kong) (Singapore)	Poon Fai Hung; Eddy Goh	7; 15	16; 17
4	(Hong Kong) (Singapore)	Chan Chi Choi / Sze Yu; Sulaiman Zaini / Wong Shoon Keat	15; 11	15; 6
5	(Hong Kong) (Singapore)	Sit Chung Leung / Wong Man Hing; Abdul Hamid Khan / Lau Wing Cheok	10; 15	5; 15

Australia
5
Queen Elizabeth Stadium
20 February 1984

Philippines
0

			1	2	3
1	(Australia) (Philippines)	Michael Scandolera; Renato Reyes	15; 3	15; 3
2	(Australia) (Philippines)	Darren McDonald; Salvador Banquiles	15; 2	18; 14
3	(Australia) (Philippines)	Paul Kong; Jessie Alonzo	15; 2	15; 9
4	(Australia) (Philippines)	Darren McDonald / Michael Scandolera; Nelson Asuncion / Daniel So	15; 6	15; 7
5	(Australia) (Philippines)	Trevor James / Paul Kong; Jessie Alonzo / Renato Reyes	15; 5	15; 2

Singapore
5
Queen Elizabeth Stadium
21 February 1984

Philippines
0

			1	2	3
1	(Singapore) (Philippines)	Wong Shoon Keat; Renato Reyes	18; 14	15; 1
2	(Singapore) (Philippines)	Lau Wing Cheok; Salvador Banquiles	15; 5	15; 8
3	(Singapore) (Philippines)	Eddy Goh; Jessie Alonzo	15; 3	15; 8
4	(Singapore) (Philippines)	Sulaiman Zaini / Wong Shoon Keat; Nelson Asuncion / Daniel So	15; 11	15; 5
5	(Singapore) (Philippines)	Abdul Hamid Khan / Lau Wing Cheok; Jessie Alonzo / Renato Reyes	15; 3	15; 8

Hong Kong
3
Queen Elizabeth Stadium
21 February 1984

Australia
2

			1	2	3
1	(Hong Kong) (Australia)	Sze Yu; Michael Scandolera	15; 5	15; 4
2	(Hong Kong) (Australia)	Chan Chi Choi; Darren McDonald	15; 11	15; 6
3	(Hong Kong) (Australia)	Poon Fai Hung; Paul Kong	6; 15	8; 15
4	(Hong Kong) (Australia)	Chan Chi Choi / Sze Yu; Darren McDonald / Michael Scandolera	8; 15	15; 6	12; 15
5	(Hong Kong) (Australia)	Sit Chung Leung / Wong Man Hing; Trevor James / Paul Kong	11; 15	15; 11	15; 7

Australia
3
Queen Elizabeth Stadium
22 February 1984

Singapore
2

			1	2	3
1	(Australia) (Singapore)	Michael Scandolera; Wong Shoon Keat	15; 11	6; 15	5; 15
2	(Australia) (Singapore)	Darren McDonald; Lau Wing Cheok	3; 15	15; 7	10; 15
3	(Australia) (Singapore)	Paul Kong; Eddy Goh	15; 17	15; 8	15; 7
4	(Australia) (Singapore)	Darren McDonald / Michael Scandolera; Sulaiman Zaini / Wong Shoon Keat	15; 7	15; 6
5	(Australia) (Singapore)	Trevor James / Paul Kong; Abdul Hamid Khan / Lau Wing Cheok	18; 14	2; 15	15; 4

Hong Kong
5
Queen Elizabeth Stadium
22 February 1984

Philippines
0

			1	2	3
1	(Hong Kong) (Philippines)	Sze Yu; Renato Reyes	15; 4	17; 14
2	(Hong Kong) (Philippines)	Chan Chi Choi; Salvador Banquiles	15; 3	15; 1
3	(Hong Kong) (Philippines)	Wong Yung; Jessie Alonzo	10; 15	17; 14	15; 13
4	(Hong Kong) (Philippines)	Sze Yu / Chan Chi Choi; Nelson Asuncion / Daniel So	15; 5	15; 10
5	(Hong Kong) (Philippines)	Sit Chung Leung / Wong Man Hing; Jessie Alonzo / Renato Reyes	15; 11	8; 15	15; 3

==== Group B ====
Pos	Team	Pld	W	L	MF	MA	MD	Pts	Qualification
1	Indonesia	2	1	0	5	0	+5	1	Advance to knockout stage
2	New Zealand	2	0	1	0	5	−5	0	Advance to knockout stage
3	Brunei	0	0	0	0	0	0	0	Withdrew

Source: Singapore Monitor

Indonesia
5
Queen Elizabeth Stadium
22 February 1984

New Zealand
0

			1	2	3
1	(Indonesia) (New Zealand)	Liem Swie King; Graeme Robson	15; 9	17; 4
2	(Indonesia) (New Zealand)	Icuk Sugiarto; Phil Horne	15; 8	15; 6
3	(Indonesia) (New Zealand)	Hadiyanto; John Miles	15; 0	15; 3
4	(Indonesia) (New Zealand)	Bobby Ertanto / Christian Hadinata; Phil Horne / Graeme Robson	15; 5	15; 5
5	(Indonesia) (New Zealand)	Rudy Heryanto / Hariamanto Kartono; Stephen Lobb / Jacob van Selm	15; 4	15; 1

=== Knockout stage ===
Semi-finals
Hong Kong	2
New Zealand	3
Australia	1
Indonesia	4

Final
New Zealand	0
Indonesia	5
Third place
Hong Kong	1
Australia	4

==== Semi-finals ====
Hong Kong
2
Queen Elizabeth Stadium
24 February 1984

New Zealand
3

			1	2	3
1	(Hong Kong) (New Zealand)	Sze Yu; Graeme Robson	15; 9	15; 3
2	(Hong Kong) (New Zealand)	Chan Chi Choi; Phil Horne	9; 15	15; 8	15; 9
3	(Hong Kong) (New Zealand)	Yeung Yik Kei; Jacob van Selm	3; 15	9; 15
4	(Hong Kong) (New Zealand)	Sze Yu / Chan Chi Choi; Phil Horne / Graeme Robson	4; 15	11; 15
5	(Hong Kong) (New Zealand)	Sit Chung Leung / Wong Man Hing; Stephen Lobb / Jacob van Selm	14; 17	10; 15

Indonesia
4
Queen Elizabeth Stadium
24 February 1984

Australia
1

			1	2	3
1	(Indonesia) (Australia)	Liem Swie King; Michael Scandolera	15; 1	17; 3
2	(Indonesia) (Australia)	Icuk Sugiarto; Darren McDonald	15; 3	15; 3
3	(Indonesia) (Australia)	Hadiyanto; Trevor James	15; 12	11; 15	11; 15
4	(Indonesia) (Australia)	Bobby Ertanto / Christian Hadinata; Darren McDonald / Michael Scandolera	15; 10	15; 13
5	(Indonesia) (Australia)	Rudy Heryanto / Hariamanto Kartono; Trevor James / Paul Kong	15; 8	15; 1

==== Third place ====
Hong Kong
1
Queen Elizabeth Stadium
25 February 1984

Australia
4

			1	2	3
1	(Hong Kong) (Australia)	Sze Yu; Michael Scandolera	15; 10	15; 1
2	(Hong Kong) (Australia)	Wong Yung; Darren McDonald	10; 15	9; 15
3	(Hong Kong) (Australia)	Lee To Shing; Paul Kong	7; 15	2; 15
4	(Hong Kong) (Australia)	Sze Yu / Wong Man Hing; Darren McDonald / Michael Scandolera	9; 15	11; 15
5	(Hong Kong) (Australia)	Poon Fai Hung / Wong Man Hing; Trevor James / Paul Kong	2; 15	2; 15

==== Final ====
Indonesia
5
Queen Elizabeth Stadium
25 February 1984

New Zealand
0

			1	2	3
1	(Indonesia) (New Zealand)	Liem Swie King; Graeme Robson	15; 5	15; 1
2	(Indonesia) (New Zealand)	Icuk Sugiarto; Phil Horne	15; 11	15; 2
3	(Indonesia) (New Zealand)	Hadiyanto; Jacob van Selm	15; 4	15; 1
4	(Indonesia) (New Zealand)	Bobby Ertanto / Christian Hadinata; Phil Horne / Graeme Robson	15; 10	15; 7
5	(Indonesia) (New Zealand)	Rudy Heryanto / Hariamanto Kartono; Stephen Lobb / Jacob van Selm	15; 6	15; 5

== European Zone ==
The European qualifying rounds were held in the Koninklijke Stallingen in Ostend, Belgium. Fourteen teams took part in the qualifiers with newcomers Belgium, Iceland and Zambia competing in qualifying for the final tournament for the first time.

=== Group stage ===
==== Group A ====
Pos	Team	Pld	W	L	MF	MA	MD	Pts	Qualification
1	England	2	2	0	10	0	+10	2	Advance to knockout stage
2	Austria	2	1	1	3	7	−4	1	
3	Norway	2	0	2	2	8	−6	0	
4	Uganda	0	0	0	0	0	0	0	Withdrew

Source: The Straits Times

England
5
Koninklijke Stallingen
23 February 1984

Norway
0

			1	2	3
1	(England) (Norway)	Nick Yates; Per Rose	15; 4	15; 0
2	(England) (Norway)	Andy Goode; Øyvind Berntsen	15; 9	15; 5
3	(England) (Norway)	Steve Butler; Jan Jacobsen	15; 5	15; 0
4	(England) (Norway)	Duncan Bridge / Martin Dew; Øyvind Berntsen / Espen Larsen	15; 9	15; 6
5	(England) (Norway)	Steve Baddeley / Mike Tredgett; Jan Jacobsen / Per Rose	15; 3	15; 6

Austria
3
Koninklijke Stallingen
23 February 1984

Norway
2

			1	2	3
1	(Austria) (Norway)	Tariq Farooq; Per Rose	15; 8	15; 12
2	(Austria) (Norway)	Klaus Fischer; Øyvind Berntsen	9; 15	15; 12	8; 15
3	(Austria) (Norway)	Heinz Fischer; Espen Larsen	15; 10	15; 12
4	(Austria) (Norway)	Gerald Hofegger / Johann Ratheyser; Øyvind Berntsen / Espen Larsen	15; 7	16; 17	15; 8
5	(Austria) (Norway)	Heinz Fischer / Klaus Fischer; Jan Jacobsen / Per Rose	10; 15	6; 15

England
5
Koninklijke Stallingen
24 February 1984

Austria
0

			1	2	3
1	(England) (Austria)	Steve Baddeley; Tariq Farooq	15; 9	15; 7
2	(England) (Austria)	Nick Yates; Klaus Fischer	15; 3	15; 10
3	(England) (Austria)	Steve Butler; Heinz Fischer	15; 9	15; 0
4	(England) (Austria)	Martin Dew / Mike Tredgett; Gerald Hofegger / Johann Ratheyser	15; 5	15; 1
5	(England) (Austria)	Duncan Bridge / Nigel Tier; Heinz Fischer / Klaus Fischer	15; 7	15; 2

==== Group B ====
Pos	Team	Pld	W	L	MF	MA	MD	Pts	Qualification
1	Sweden	3	3	0	13	2	+11	3	Advance to knockout stage
2	Netherlands	3	1	2	6	9	−3	1	
3	Wales	3	2	1	9	6	+3	2	
4	Finland	3	0	3	2	13	−11	0	

Source: The Straits Times

Sweden
5
Koninklijke Stallingen
23 February 1984

Finland
0

			1	2	3
1	(Sweden) (Finland)	Stefan Karlsson; Heikki Holvikari	15; 5	15; 5
2	(Sweden) (Finland)	Ulf Johansson; Tony Tuominen	15; 3	15; 10
3	(Sweden) (Finland)	Göran Carlsson; Thomas Westerholm	15; 7	15; 11
4	(Sweden) (Finland)	Stefan Karlsson / Claes Nordin; Heikki Holvikari / Thomas Westerholm	15; 3	15; 11
5	(Sweden) (Finland)	Torbjörn Pettersson / Lars Wengberg; Mika Heinonen / Tony Tuominen	15; 4	15; 6

Netherlands
1
Koninklijke Stallingen
23 February 1984

Wales
4

			1	2	3
1	(Netherlands) (Wales)	Rob Ridder; Chris Rees	12; 15	15; 18
2	(Netherlands) (Wales)	Pierre Pelupessy; Barry Burns	17; 15	15; 10
3	(Netherlands) (Wales)	Guus van der Vlugt; John Murtagh	13; 15	15; 11	15; 18
4	(Netherlands) (Wales)	Rob Ridder / Uun Santosa; Chris Rees / Lyndon Williams	15; 11	10; 15	13; 15
5	(Netherlands) (Wales)	Pierre Pelupessy / Bas von Barnau Sijthoff; Barry Burns / Lim Yim Chong	15; 18	9; 15

Sweden
4
Koninklijke Stallingen
23 February 1984

Wales
1

			1	2	3
1	(Sweden) (Wales)	Stefan Karlsson; Chris Rees	15; 3	15; 8
2	(Sweden) (Wales)	Ulf Johansson; Barry Burns	15; 10	15; 6
3	(Sweden) (Wales)	Göran Carlsson; Andrew Carlotti	15; 5	15; 2
4	(Sweden) (Wales)	Stefan Karlsson / Claes Nordin; Chris Rees / Lyndon Williams	15; 4	8; 15	13; 15
5	(Sweden) (Wales)	Torbjörn Pettersson / Lars Wengberg; Barry Burns / Lim Yim Chong	15; 8	15; 11

Netherlands
4
Koninklijke Stallingen
23 February 1984

Finland
1

			1	2	3
1	(Netherlands) (Finland)	Rob Ridder; Heikki Holvikari	11; 15	14; 18
2	(Netherlands) (Finland)	Pierre Pelupessy; Tony Tuominen	15; 7	15; 3
3	(Netherlands) (Finland)	Guus van der Vlugt; Thomas Westerholm	15; 7	7; 15	15; 5
4	(Netherlands) (Finland)	Ivan Kristanto / Frank van Dongen; Heikki Holvikari / Thomas Westerholm	15; 6	15; 10
5	(Netherlands) (Finland)	Uun Santosa / Bas von Barnau Sijthoff; Mika Heinonen / Tony Tuominen	15; 11	15; 7

Sweden
4
Koninklijke Stallingen
24 February 1984

Netherlands
1

			1	2	3
1	(Sweden) (Netherlands)	Stefan Karlsson; Lex Coene	15; 9	15; 5
2	(Sweden) (Netherlands)	Ulf Johansson; Uun Santosa	15; 3	15; 4
3	(Sweden) (Netherlands)	Göran Carlsson; Pierre Pelupessy	15; 17	15; 5	18; 16
4	(Sweden) (Netherlands)	Stefan Karlsson / Claes Nordin; Ivan Kristanto / Frank van Dongen	15; 5	15; 6
5	(Sweden) (Netherlands)	Torbjörn Pettersson / Lars Wengberg; Uun Santosa / Bas von Barnau Sijthoff	15; 5	10; 15	10; 15

Wales
4
Koninklijke Stallingen
24 February 1984

Finland
1

			1	2	3
1	(Wales) (Finland)	Chris Rees; Heikki Holvikari	15; 3	15; 11
2	(Wales) (Finland)	Barry Burns; Tony Tuominen	13; 15	15; 12	15; 11
3	(Wales) (Finland)	John Murtagh; Thomas Westerholm	17; 18	15; 7	13; 15
4	(Wales) (Finland)	Chris Rees / Lyndon Williams; Heikki Holvikari / Thomas Westerholm	15; 6	15; 8
5	(Wales) (Finland)	Barry Burns / Lim Yim Chong; Mika Heinonen / Tony Tuominen	15; 9	15; 8

==== Group C ====
Pos	Team	Pld	W	L	MF	MA	MD	Pts	Qualification
1	Scotland	3	3	0	13	2	+11	3	Advance to knockout stage
2	West Germany	3	2	1	9	6	+3	2	
3	Belgium	3	1	2	5	10	−5	1	
4	Iceland	3	0	3	3	12	−9	0	

Source: The Straits Times

West Germany
5
Koninklijke Stallingen
23 February 1984

Belgium
0

			1	2	3
1	(West Germany) (Belgium)	Thomas Künstler; Eddy van Herbruggen	15; 7	15; 4
2	(West Germany) (Belgium)	Uwe Scherpen; Jan de Mulder	15; 7	15; 10
3	(West Germany) (Belgium)	Ulli Rost; Jos Warmoes	15; 6	15; 8
4	(West Germany) (Belgium)	Harald Klauer / Gerhard Treitinger; Patrick de Ruisseau / Eddy van Herbruggen	15; 4	15; 10
5	(West Germany) (Belgium)	Stefan Frey / Thomas Künstler; Christian Bene / Jan de Mulder	15; 5	15; 4

Scotland
5
Koninklijke Stallingen
23 February 1984

Iceland
0

			1	2	3
1	(Scotland) (Iceland)	Alex White; Broddi Kristjánsson	2; 15	15; 11	15; 3
2	(Scotland) (Iceland)	Kenny Middlemiss; Þorsteinn Páll Hængsson	15; 8	15; 4
3	(Scotland) (Iceland)	Gordon Hamilton; Jóhann Kjartansson	7; 15	15; 9	15; 12
4	(Scotland) (Iceland)	Billy Gilliland / Dan Travers; Guðmundur Adolfsson / Broddi Kristjánsson	15; 1	15; 1
5	(Scotland) (Iceland)	Iain Pringle / Alex White; Sigfús Ægir Árnason / Jóhann Kjartansson	15; 1	15; 4

Scotland
3
Koninklijke Stallingen
23 February 1984

Belgium
2

			1	2	3
1	(Scotland) (Belgium)	Alex White; Eddy van Herbruggen	13; 18	9; 15
2	(Scotland) (Belgium)	Kenny Middlemiss; Jan de Mulder	13; 15	7; 15
3	(Scotland) (Belgium)	Gordon Hamilton; Jos Warmoes	15; 4	15; 7
4	(Scotland) (Belgium)	Billy Gilliland / Dan Travers; Patrick de Ruisseau / Eddy van Herbruggen	15; 12	15; 9
5	(Scotland) (Belgium)	Iain Pringle / Alex White; Michel Bauduin / Christian Bene	15; 5	15; 7

West Germany
4
Koninklijke Stallingen
23 February 1984

Iceland
1

			1	2	3
1	(West Germany) (Iceland)	Harald Klauer; Broddi Kristjánsson	15; 7	9; 15	4; 15
2	(West Germany) (Iceland)	Thomas Künstler; Þorsteinn Páll Hængsson	15; 1	15; 5
3	(West Germany) (Iceland)	Uwe Scherpen; Guðmundur Adolfsson	15; 8	15; 8
4	(West Germany) (Iceland)	Harald Klauer / Gerhard Treitinger; Þorsteinn Páll Hængsson / Broddi Kristjánsson	15; 4	15; 3
5	(West Germany) (Iceland)	Stefan Frey / Thomas Künstler; Sigfús Ægir Árnason / Jóhann Kjartansson	15; 2	15; 3

West Germany
0
Koninklijke Stallingen
24 February 1984

Scotland
5

			1	2	3
1	(West Germany) (Scotland)	Thomas Künstler; Alex White	15; 11	7; 15	0; 15
2	(West Germany) (Scotland)	Uwe Scherpen; Kenny Middlemiss	15; 9	11; 15	4; 15
3	(West Germany) (Scotland)	Ulli Rost; Billy Gilliland	7; 15	15; 4	4; 15
4	(West Germany) (Scotland)	Stefan Frey / Thomas Künstler; Iain Pringle / Alex White	8; 15	10; 15
5	(West Germany) (Scotland)	Harald Klauer / Gerhard Treitinger; Billy Gilliland / Dan Travers	7; 15	9; 15

Belgium
3
Koninklijke Stallingen
24 February 1984

Iceland
2

			1	2	3
1	(Belgium) (Iceland)	Eddy van Herbruggen; Broddi Kristjánsson	15; 10	8; 15	14; 17
2	(Belgium) (Iceland)	Jan de Mulder; Jóhann Kjartansson	15; 11	15; 4
3	(Belgium) (Iceland)	Jos Warmoes; Guðmundur Adolfsson	15; 11	15; 2
4	(Belgium) (Iceland)	Michel Bauduin / Christian Bene; Sigfús Ægir Árnason / Jóhann Kjartansson	8; 15	8; 15
5	(Belgium) (Iceland)	Patrick de Ruisseau / Eddy van Herbruggen; Þorsteinn Páll Hængsson / Broddi Kristjánsson	12; 15	15; 10	15; 10

==== Group D ====
Pos	Team	Pld	W	L	MF	MA	MD	Pts	Qualification
1	Denmark	2	2	0	10	0	+10	2	Advance to knockout stage
2	Ireland	2	1	1	5	5	0	1	
3	Zambia	2	0	2	0	10	−10	0	

Source: The Straits Times

Denmark
5
Koninklijke Stallingen
23 February 1984

Zambia
0

			1	2	3
1	(Denmark) (Zambia)	Michael Kjeldsen; Simon Gondwe	15; 3	15; 6
2	(Denmark) (Zambia)	Ib Frederiksen; Bernard Mwape	15; 5	15; 1
3	(Denmark) (Zambia)	Claus Andersen; Majority Chola	15; 5	15; 0
4	(Denmark) (Zambia)	Steen Fladberg / Jesper Helledie; Simon Gondwe / Bernard Mwape	15; 2	15; 3
5	(Denmark) (Zambia)	Mark Christiansen / Michael Kjeldsen; Bernard Chimfwembe / Ramesh Patel	15; 1	15; 1

Ireland
5
Koninklijke Stallingen
23 February 1984

Zambia
0

			1	2	3
1	(Republic of Ireland) (Zambia)	Bill Thompson; Simon Gondwe	15; 2	15; 2
2	(Republic of Ireland) (Zambia)	Pat Marron; Bernard Chimfwembe	15; 4	15; 3
3	(Republic of Ireland) (Zambia)	Stephen Beveridge; Majority Chola	15; 1	15; 1
4	(Republic of Ireland) (Zambia)	Frazer Evans / Bill Thompson; Simon Gondwe / Bernard Mwape	15; 0	15; 5
5	(Republic of Ireland) (Zambia)	Graham Henderson / Pat Marron; Bernard Chimfwembe / Majority Chola	15; 1	15; 1

Denmark
5
Koninklijke Stallingen
24 February 1984

Ireland
0

			1	2	3
1	(Denmark) (Republic of Ireland)	Michael Kjeldsen; Bill Thompson	15; 4	15; 5
2	(Denmark) (Republic of Ireland)	Ib Frederiksen; Pat Marron	15; 1	15; 8
3	(Denmark) (Republic of Ireland)	Claus Andersen; Stephen Beveridge	15; 5	15; 5
4	(Denmark) (Republic of Ireland)	Steen Fladberg / Jesper Helledie; Frazer Evans / Bill Thompson	15; 3	15; 9
5	(Denmark) (Republic of Ireland)	Mark Christiansen / Michael Kjeldsen; Graham Henderson / Pat Marron	15; 8	15; 4

=== Knockout stage ===
Semi-finals
England	4
Sweden	1
Scotland	0
Denmark	5

Final
England	2
Denmark	3
Third place
Sweden	5
Scotland	0

==== Semi-finals ====
Denmark
5
Koninklijke Stallingen
25 February 1984

Scotland
0

			1	2	3
1	(Denmark) (Scotland)	Morten Frost; Alex White	15; 2	15; 1
2	(Denmark) (Scotland)	Jens Peter Nierhoff; Kenny Middlemiss	15; 3	15; 6
3	(Denmark) (Scotland)	Ib Frederiksen; Gordon Hamilton	15; 3	17; 18	15; 7
4	(Denmark) (Scotland)	Morten Frost / Jens Peter Nierhoff; Billy Gilliland / Dan Travers	15; 4	15; 11
5	(Denmark) (Scotland)	Mark Christiansen / Michael Kjeldsen; Iain Pringle / Alex White	15; 7	15; 5

England
4
Koninklijke Stallingen
25 February 1984

Sweden
1

			1	2	3
1	(England) (Sweden)	Steve Baddeley; Stefan Karlsson	10; 15	7; 15
2	(England) (Sweden)	Nick Yates; Ulf Johansson	15; 13	15; 5
3	(England) (Sweden)	Steve Butler; Göran Carlsson	12; 15	15; 11	15; 4
4	(England) (Sweden)	Martin Dew / Mike Tredgett; Stefan Karlsson / Claes Nordin	6; 15	15; 0	15; 8
5	(England) (Sweden)	Duncan Bridge / Nigel Tier; Torbjörn Pettersson / Lars Wengberg	15; 8	15; 8

==== Third place ====
Sweden
5
Koninklijke Stallingen
26 February 1984

Scotland
0

			1	2	3
1	(Sweden) (Scotland)	Stefan Karlsson; Alex White	15; 1	15; 3
2	(Sweden) (Scotland)	Ulf Johansson; Kenny Middlemiss	15; 12	15; 5
3	(Sweden) (Scotland)	Göran Carlsson; Thomas Westerholm	15; 6	11; 15	15; 6
4	(Sweden) (Scotland)	Stefan Karlsson / Claes Nordin; Billy Gilliland / Dan Travers	15; 3	15; 11
5	(Sweden) (Scotland)	Torbjörn Pettersson / Lars Wengberg; Iain Pringle / Alex White	15; 12	12; 15	15; 12

==== Final ====
Denmark
3
Koninklijke Stallingen
26 February 1984

England
2

			1	2	3
1	(Denmark) (England)	Morten Frost; Steve Baddeley	15; 10	18; 15
2	(Denmark) (England)	Jens Peter Nierhoff; Nick Yates	2; 15	5; 15
3	(Denmark) (England)	Michael Kjeldsen; Steve Butler	8; 15	15; 10	15; 3
4	(Denmark) (England)	Morten Frost / Jens Peter Nierhoff; Martin Dew / Mike Tredgett	15; 8	15; 17	4; 15
5	(Denmark) (England)	Mark Christiansen / Michael Kjeldsen; Duncan Bridge / Nigel Tier	15; 10	15; 10

== Pan American Zone ==
The qualifying rounds for the Pan American zone were held at the Humber College Athletic Center in Toronto, Canada. Seven teams competed in qualifying for the final tournament.

=== Group stage ===
==== Group A ====
Pos	Team	Pld	W	L	MF	MA	MD	Pts	Qualification
1	Japan	3	3	0	15	0	+15	3	Advance to knockout stage
2	United States	3	2	1	8	7	+1	2	Advance to knockout stage
3	Chinese Taipei	3	1	2	7	8	−1	1	
4	Nigeria	3	0	3	0	15	−15	0	

Source: The Straits Times

United States
5
Humber College
22 February 1984

Nigeria
0

			1	2	3
1	(United States) (Nigeria)	Rodney Barton; Samson Egbeyemi	15; 7	15; 7
2	(United States) (Nigeria)	Tony Alston; Clement Ogbo	15; 9	15; 2
3	(United States) (Nigeria)	Danny Brady; Fatai Tokosi	15; 9	18; 15
4	(United States) (Nigeria)	Mathew Fogarty / Bruce Pontow; Clement Ogbo / Fatai Tokosi	15; 2	15; 6
5	(United States) (Nigeria)	Mike Adams / John Britton; Samson Egbeyemi / Benjamin Orakpo	15; 10	18; 1

Japan
5
Humber College
22 February 1984

Chinese Taipei
0

			1	2	3
1	(Japan) (Chinese Taipei)	Hiroyuki Hasegawa; Liu Han-chia	15; 5	6; 15	15; 10
2	(Japan) (Chinese Taipei)	Shinji Matsuura; Chen Huo-chuan	15; 6	15; 7
3	(Japan) (Chinese Taipei)	Hiroshi Nishiyama; Chung Chia-chen	15; 8	15; 10
4	(Japan) (Chinese Taipei)	Shuji Matsuno / Shinji Matsuura; Liu Han-chia / Tseng Hsueh-chih	15; 7	15; 6
5	(Japan) (Chinese Taipei)	Tetsuaki Inoue / Shōkichi Miyamori; Chung Tsung-lieh / Liao Kun-fu	18; 14	15; 9

Japan
5
Humber College
23 February 1984

Nigeria
0

			1	2	3
1	(Japan) (Nigeria)	Hiroyuki Hasegawa; Samson Egbeyemi	15; 0	18; 16
2	(Japan) (Nigeria)	Shinji Matsuura; Benjamin Orakpo	15; 1	15; 6
3	(Japan) (Nigeria)	Hiroshi Nishiyama; Oyelolo Oyebola	15; 5	15; 1
4	(Japan) (Nigeria)	Shuji Matsuno / Shinji Matsuura; Clement Ogbo / Fatai Tokosi	15; 5	15; 2
5	(Japan) (Nigeria)	Tetsuaki Inoue / Shōkichi Miyamori; Samson Egbeyemi / Benjamin Orakpo	15; 10	15; 4

United States
3
Humber College
23 February 1984

Chinese Taipei
2

			1	2	3
1	(United States) (Chinese Taipei)	Rodney Barton; Liu Han-chia	10; 15	9; 15
2	(United States) (Chinese Taipei)	Tony Alston; Chen Huo-chuan	15; 12	15; 11
3	(United States) (Chinese Taipei)	Danny Brady; Chung Chia-chen	15; 6	11; 15	1; 15
4	(United States) (Chinese Taipei)	Mathew Fogarty / Bruce Pontow; Liu Han-chia / Tseng Hsueh-chih	15; 12	15; 8
5	(United States) (Chinese Taipei)	Mike Adams / John Britton; Chung Tsung-lieh / Liao Kun-fu	15; 8	18; 13

Chinese Taipei
5
Humber College
23 February 1984

Nigeria
0

			1	2	3
1	(Chinese Taipei) (Nigeria)	Liu Han-chia; Samson Egbeyemi	15; 5	15; 9
2	(Chinese Taipei) (Nigeria)	Chen Huo-chuan; Clement Ogbo	15; 8	15; 3
3	(Chinese Taipei) (Nigeria)	Chung Chia-chen; Fatai Tokosi	15; 2	15; 4
4	(Chinese Taipei) (Nigeria)	Liu Han-chia / Tseng Hsueh-chih; Clement Ogbo / Fatai Tokosi	15; 2	15; 11
5	(Chinese Taipei) (Nigeria)	Chung Tsung-lieh / Liao Kun-fu; Samson Egbeyemi / Benjamin Orakpo	15; 5	15; 4

Japan
5
Humber College
23 February 1984

United States
0

			1	2	3
1	(Japan) (United States)	Hiroyuki Hasegawa; Rodney Barton	15; 13	15; 5
2	(Japan) (United States)	Shinji Matsuura; Tony Alston	15; 2	15; 5
3	(Japan) (United States)	Hiroshi Nishiyama; Gary Higgins	2; 15	15; 2	13; 10	retired
4	(Japan) (United States)	Shuji Matsuno / Shinji Matsuura; Mike Adams / Danny Brady	15; 11	15; 7
5	(Japan) (United States)	Tetsuaki Inoue / Shōkichi Miyamori; Mathew Fogarty / Bruce Pontow	15; 6	14; 17	15; 11

==== Group B ====
Pos	Team	Pld	W	L	MF	MA	MD	Pts	Qualification
1	Canada	2	2	0	10	9	+1	2	Advance to knockout stage
2	Mexico	2	1	1	4	6	−2	1	Advance to knockout stage
3	Peru	2	0	2	1	9	−8	0	

Source: The Straits Times

Canada
5
Humber College
22 February 1984

Peru
0

			1	2	3
1	(Canada) (Peru)	Mike Butler; Gustavo Salazar	15; 11	15; 7
2	(Canada) (Peru)	Bob MacDougall; Federico Valdez	15; 12	15; 4
3	(Canada) (Peru)	John Goss; Germán Valdez	15; 1	17; 18	15; 5
4	(Canada) (Peru)	Mike Bitten / Mike deBelle; Federico Valdez / Germán Valdez	15; 10	15; 6
5	(Canada) (Peru)	Mark Freitag / Bob MacDougall; Armando del Carpio / Gustavo Salazar	15; 3	15; 7

Mexico
4
Humber College
22 February 1984

Peru
1

			1	2	3
1	(Mexico) (Peru)	Roy Díaz González; Gustavo Salazar	13; 18	15; 2	12; 15
2	(Mexico) (Peru)	Fernando de la Torre; Federico Valdez	15; 4	13; 15	17; 14
3	(Mexico) (Peru)	Eugenio Tapia; Germán Valdez	15; 12	8; 15	15; 12
4	(Mexico) (Peru)	Ricardo Jaramillo / Victor Jaramillo; Federico Valdez / Germán Valdez	15; 12	13; 18	15; 10
5	(Mexico) (Peru)	Ernesto de la Torre / Fernando de la Torre; Armando del Carpio / Gustavo Salazar	15; 7	15; 7

Canada
5
Humber College
23 February 1984

Mexico
0

			1	2	3
1	(Canada) (Mexico)	Mike Butler; Roy Díaz González	18; 14	15; 7
2	(Canada) (Mexico)	John Goss; Fernando de la Torre	15; 3	15; 9
3	(Canada) (Mexico)	Keith Priestman; Eugenio Tapia	15; 5	15; 7
4	(Canada) (Mexico)	Mike Bitten / Mike deBelle; Ricardo Jaramillo / Victor Jaramillo	15; 12	15; 0
5	(Canada) (Mexico)	Mark Freitag / Bob MacDougall; Ernesto de la Torre / Fernando de la Torre	15; 3	15; 6

=== Knockout stage ===
Semi-finals
Japan	5
Mexico	0
United States	1
Canada	4

Final
Japan	3
Canada	2
Third place
Mexico	0
United States	5

==== Semi-finals ====
Japan
5
Humber College
24 February 1984

Mexico
0

			1	2	3
1	(Japan) (Mexico)	Hiroyuki Hasegawa; Roy Díaz González	15; 8	15; 2
2	(Japan) (Mexico)	Shinji Matsuura; Fernando de la Torre	18; 15	15; 10
3	(Japan) (Mexico)	Hiroshi Nishiyama; Ernesto de la Torre	15; 7	15; 10
4	(Japan) (Mexico)	Shuji Matsuno / Shinji Matsuura; Ricardo Jaramillo / Victor Jaramillo	15; 2	15; 2
5	(Japan) (Mexico)	Tetsuaki Inoue / Shōkichi Miyamori; Ernesto de la Torre / Eugenio Tapia	15; 4	15; 4

Canada
4
Humber College
24 February 1984

United States
1

			1	2	3
1	(Canada) (United States)	Mike Butler; Rodney Barton	18; 5	15; 9
2	(Canada) (United States)	Bob MacDougall; Tony Alston	8; 15	15; 13	15; 6
3	(Canada) (United States)	John Goss; Danny Brady	15; 12	15; 5
4	(Canada) (United States)	Mike Bitten / Mike deBelle; Mathew Fogarty / Bruce Pontow	8; 15	6; 15
5	(Canada) (United States)	Mark Freitag / Bob MacDougall; Mike Adams / John Britton	15; 10	15; 8

==== Third place ====
United States
5
Humber College
25 February 1984

Mexico
0

			1	2	3
1	(United States) (Mexico)	Rodney Barton; Fernando de la Torre	15; 8	15; 11
2	(United States) (Mexico)	Tony Alston; Eugenio Tapia	18; 1	15; 10
3	(United States) (Mexico)	Danny Brady; Ernesto de la Torre	15; 2	15; 7
4	(United States) (Mexico)	Mathew Fogarty / Bruce Pontow; Ricardo Jaramillo / Victor Jaramillo	15; 11	15; 4
5	(United States) (Mexico)	Mike Adams / John Britton; Ernesto de la Torre / Eugenio Tapia	15; 10	15; 7

==== Final ====
Japan
3
Humber College
25 February 1984

Canada
2

			1	2	3
1	(Japan) (Canada)	Hiroyuki Hasegawa; Mike Butler	15; 8	15; 2
2	(Japan) (Canada)	Shinji Matsuura; Bob MacDougall	10; 15	17; 18
3	(Japan) (Canada)	Hiroshi Nishiyama; John Goss	15; 9	15; 12
4	(Japan) (Canada)	Shuji Matsuno / Shinji Matsuura; Mike Bitten / Mike deBelle	15; 10	15; 2
5	(Japan) (Canada)	Tetsuaki Inoue / Shōkichi Miyamori; Mark Freitag / Bob MacDougall	15; 11	15; 11
