= 1985 IBF World Championships – Men's doubles =

Men's doubles at the 1985 IBF World Championships
- Venue: Olympic Saddledome
- Location: Calgary, Canada
- Dates: June 10, 1985 – June 16, 1985

Medalists
gold medal	Park Joo-bong; Kim Moon-soo	South Korea
silver medal	Li Yongbo; Tian Bingyi	China
bronze medal	Liem Swie King; Hariamanto Kartono	Indonesia
bronze medal	Mark Christensen; Michael Kjeldsen	Denmark

The 1985 IBF World Championships (World Badminton Championships) were held in Calgary, Canada, from June 10 to June 16, 1985. Following the results of the men's doubles.

== Qualification ==
- (Thailand) Sakrapee Thongsari/Surachai Makkasasithorn - (Germany) Harald Klauer/Uwe Scherpen: 15:7, 15:9
- (Nigeria) Benjamin Orakpo/Tamuno Gibson - (Pakistan) S. Afgan/A. Mugeet: w.o.
- (Japan) Shinji Matsuura/Shūji Matsuno - (England) Nigel Tier/Andy Goode: 18:13, 15:12
- (Scotland) Billy Gilliland/Dan Travers - (Zambia) S. Gondwe/A. Mutale: w.o.
- (India) Leory D'Sa/Sanat Misra - (Pakistan) : w.o.

== Main stage ==
=== Section 1 ===
First round
(South Korea) Kim Moon-soo (South Korea) Park Joo-bong	15	15
(India) Pradeep S. Gandhe (India) Vimal Kumar	5	8
(China) Zhou Jincan (China) Ding Qiqing	15	15
(Mexico) Fernando de la Torre (Mexico) Ernesto de la Torre	7	3
(Denmark) Steen Fladberg (Denmark) Jesper Helledie	15	15
(Canada) Bob MacDougall (Canada) Ken Poole	6	4
(Thailand) Sakrapee Thongsari (Thailand) Surachai Makkasasithorn	15	9	18
(Taiwan) Chang Wen-Sung (Taiwan) Gan Rong-Yih	6	15	15
(Indonesia) Hariamanto Kartono (Indonesia) Liem Swie King	w.o.
(Scotland) Iain Pringle (Scotland) Alex White
(United States) Chris Jogis (United States) Kevin Hussey	15	15
(Nigeria) Benjamin Orakpo (Nigeria) Tamuno Gibson	0	6
(Sweden) Stefan Karlsson (Sweden) Thomas Kihlström	15	15
(Peru) Alfredo Salazar (Peru) Gustavo Salazar	1	2
(Zambia) R. Patel (Zambia) Raj Patel (badminton)
(Japan) Shinji Matsuura (Japan) Shūji Matsuno	w.o.

Second round
(South Korea) Kim Moon-soo (South Korea) Park Joo-bong	15	15
(China) Zhou Jincan (China) Ding Qiqing	0	2
(Denmark) Steen Fladberg (Denmark) Jesper Helledie	15	15
(Thailand) Sakrapee Thongsari (Thailand) Surachai Makkasasithorn	8	5
(Indonesia) Hariamanto Kartono (Indonesia) Liem Swie King	15	15
(United States) Chris Jogis (United States) Kevin Hussey	8	1
(Sweden) Stefan Karlsson (Sweden) Thomas Kihlström	15	15
(Japan) Shinji Matsuura (Japan) Shūji Matsuno	7	4

Quarterfinals
(South Korea) Kim Moon-soo (South Korea) Park Joo-bong	15	15
(Denmark) Steen Fladberg (Denmark) Jesper Helledie	12	6
(Indonesia) Hariamanto Kartono (Indonesia) Liem Swie King	18	15
(Sweden) Stefan Karlsson (Sweden) Thomas Kihlström	16	8

Semi finals
(South Korea) Kim Moon-soo (South Korea) Park Joo-bong	15	17
(Indonesia) Hariamanto Kartono (Indonesia) Liem Swie King	11	15

=== Section 2 ===
First round
(Scotland) Billy Gilliland (Scotland) Dan Travers	15	15
(Peru) Federico Valdez (Peru) German Valdez	5	8
(England) Steve Baddeley (England) Martin Dew	15	15
(Nigeria) Samson Egbeyemi (Nigeria) Clement Ogbo	4	7
(Japan) Hiroyuki Hasegawa (Japan) Hiroshi Nishiyama	15	15
(Austria) Klaus Fischer (Austria) Heinz Fischer	4	4
(Denmark) Mark Christiansen (Denmark) Michael Kjeldsen	15	15
(Canada) Mike deBelle (Canada) Mike Bitten	2	5
(India) Leroy D'Sa (India) Sanat Misra	15	15
(New Zealand) Graeme Robson (Germany) Rolf Rüsseler	11	9
(Indonesia) Hadibowo Susanto (Indonesia) Rudy Heryanto	15	18
(Sweden) Jan-Eric Antonsson (Sweden) Pär-Gunnar Jönsson	8	17
(South Korea) Lee Suk Ho (South Korea) Kwak Chan Ho	12	15	15
(United States) Rodney Barton (United States) Bob Gilmour	15	2	4
(Socialist Federal Republic of Yugoslavia) Gregor Berden (Iceland) Broddi Kristjansson	5	1
(China) Li Yongbo (China) Tian Bingyi	15	15

Second round
(Scotland) Billy Gilliland (Scotland) Dan Travers	18	15
(England) Steve Baddeley (England) Martin Dew	16	13
(Japan) Hiroyuki Hasegawa (Japan) Hiroshi Nishiyama	8	13
(Denmark) Mark Christiansen (Denmark) Michael Kjeldsen	15	15
(India) Leroy D'Sa (India) Sanat Misra	6	7
(Indonesia) Hadibowo Susanto (Indonesia) Rudy Heryanto	15	15
(South Korea) Lee Suk Ho (South Korea) Kwak Chan Ho	10	9
(China) Li Yongbo (China) Tian Bingyi	15	15

Quarterfinals
(Scotland) Billy Gilliland (Scotland) Dan Travers	15	10	5
(Denmark) Mark Christiansen (Denmark) Michael Kjeldsen	12	15	15
(Indonesia) Hadibowo Susanto (Indonesia) Rudy Heryanto	18	1	6
(China) Li Yongbo (China) Tian Bingyi	17	15	15

Semi finals
(Denmark) Mark Christiansen (Denmark) Michael Kjeldsen	16	18	3
(China) Li Yongbo (China) Tian Bingyi	18	14	15

== Final stage ==
Quarterfinals
(South Korea) Kim Moon-soo (South Korea) Park Joo-bong	15	15
(Denmark) Steen Fladberg (Denmark) Jesper Helledie	12	6
(Indonesia) Hariamanto Kartono (Indonesia) Liem Swie King	18	15
(Sweden) Stefan Karlsson (Sweden) Thomas Kihlström	16	8
(Scotland) Billy Gilliland (Scotland) Dan Travers	15	10	5
(Denmark) Mark Christiansen (Denmark) Michael Kjeldsen	12	15	15
(Indonesia) Hadibowo Susanto (Indonesia) Rudy Heryanto	18	1	6
(China) Li Yongbo (China) Tian Bingyi	17	15	15

Semifinals
(South Korea) Kim Moon-soo (South Korea) Park Joo-bong	15	17
(Indonesia) Hariamanto Kartono (Indonesia) Liem Swie King	11	15
(Denmark) Mark Christiansen (Denmark) Michael Kjeldsen	16	18	3
2	(China) Li Yongbo (China) Tian Bingyi	18	14	15

Finals
(South Korea) Kim Moon-soo (South Korea) Park Joo-bong	5	15	15
(China) Li Yongbo (China) Tian Bingyi	15	7	9
