= Kumar (name) =

Kumar (Sanskrit: कुमार), meaning child, may be used as a personal title, a given name or a family name. It was also the name of Kartikeya, the son of the Hindu god Shiva.

== People ==
=== First name ===
- Kumar Bhattacharyya, Baron Bhattacharyya (born 1940), Indian-British engineer and politician
- Kumar Mangalam Birla (born 1967), Indian businessman
- Kumar Dharmasena (born 1971), Sri Lankan cricketer
- Kumar Gandharva (1924–1992), Indian singer
- Kumar Gaurav (born 1960), Indian film actor
- Kumar Indrajitsinhji (born 1937), Indian cricketer
- Kumar Malavalli, Indian businessman
- Kumar Pallana (born 1918), Indian film actor
- Kumar Ponnambalam (1940–2000), Sri Lankan lawyer and politician
- Kumar Sangakkara (born 1977), Sri Lankan cricketer
- Kumar Sanu (born 1957), Indian playback singer
- Kumar Shahani, Indian film director
- Kumar Shri Duleepsinhji (1905–1959), Indian cricketer
- Kumar Vishwas, Hindi-language performance poet

=== Middle name ===
- Shiv Kumar Batalvi (1936–1973), Indian poet
- Pawan Kumar Chamling (born 1950), Indian politician
- Suniti Kumar Chatterji (1890–1977), Indian linguist
- Akshay Kumar Datta (1820–1886), Bengali writer
- Sunil Kumar Desai, Indian film director
- Ananth Kumar Hegde (born 1968), Indian politician
- Krishna Kumar Kunnath (born 1970), Indian playback singer
- Hemanta Kumar Mukhopadhyay (1920–1989), Indian singer, composer and producer
- Sushil Kumar Modi, Indian politician
- Braj Kumar Nehru (1909–2001), Indian politician and diplomat
- Madhav Kumar Nepal (born 1953), Nepalese politician
- Roop Kumar Rathod (born 1973), Indian playback singer and music director
- Tapan Kumar Pradhan (born 1972), Indian bank, activist and poet
- C. Kumar N. Patel (born 1938), Indian engineer and inventor
- Yogesh Kumar Sabharwal (born 1942), Indian judge
- Srinivas Kumar Sinha (born 1926), Indian military officer
- Devendra Kumar Joshi (born 1954), 21st Chief of Naval Staff of the Indian Navy
- Nani Kumar Ghanta (born 1984), Indian Telugu film actor

=== Last name ===
==== A ====
- Ajith Kumar (born 1971), Indian film actor and car racer
- Akhil Kumar (born 1981), Indian boxer
- Akshay Kumar (born 1967), Indian film actor
- Amit Kumar (born 1952), Indian film actor, playback singer and director
- Anant Kumar (born 1969), is a German author of Indian descent
- Ananth Kumar (born 1959), Indian politician
- Anil Kumar (discus thrower) (born 1975), Indian discus thrower
- Anoop Kumar (1926–1997), Indian film actor
- Anup Kumar (actor) (1930–1998), Indian film actor
- Anup Kumar (politician), Fijian politician
- Anurag Kumar, Indian engineer
- Ashok Kumar (1911–2001), Indian film actor
- Ashok Kumar (British politician) (born 1956), Indian-British politician

==== B–F ====
- Bhushan Kumar, Indian film producer
- Deepak Kumar (historian) (born 1952), Indian historian and philosopher
- Digendra Kumar (born 1969), Indian military officer
- Dilip Kumar (born 1922), Indian film actor and politician
- Dinesh Kumar (boxer) (born 1988), Indian boxer
- Dinesh Kumar (choreographer), Indian choreographer
- Divya Khosla Kumar, Indian actress

==== G–J ====
- Girish Kumar (born 1989), Indian film actor
- Gulshan Kumar (1956–1997), Indian film producer
- Guran Ditt Kumar, Indian revolutionary
- G. V. Prakash Kumar (born 1987), Indian music score composer
- Hri Kumar, Singaporean politician
- Indra Kumar, Indian film director and producer
- Jainendra Kumar (1905–1988), Indian writer
- Jitender Kumar (middleweight boxer) (born 1977), Indian boxer
- Jitender Kumar (flyweight boxer) (born 1988), Indian boxer

==== K–O ====
- Karthik Kumar (born 1977), Indian theatre and film actor
- Kiran Kumar, Indian film actor
- Kishore Kumar (1929–1987), Indian film actor and playback singer
- Krishan Kumar (sociologist) (born 1942), British sociologist
- Krishan Kumar (actor), Indian film actor and producer
- Krishna Kumar (actor), Indian film actor
- Manoj Kumar (born 1937), Indian film actor and director
- Meira Kumar (born 1945), Indian politician
- Mukesh Kumar (field hockey) (born 1970), Indian field hockey player
- Naresh Kumar (born 1928), Indian tennis player
- Nish Kumar, British stand-up comedian
- Nikhil Kumar (disambiguation)
- Nitish Kumar (born 1951), Indian politician

==== P–R ====
- Pawan Kumar (director), film Director, actor and screenwriter
- Pooja Kumar (model), American film actress and model
- Pradeep Kumar (actor) (1925–2001), Bengali film actor
- Praveen Kumar (Delhi politician) (born 1986), Indian cricketer
- Prem Kumar (Malayalam actor) (born 1967), Indian film actor in Malayalam films
- Prem Kumar (Kannada actor), Indian film actor in Kannada films
- Prem Kumar (footballer) (born 1989), Indian footballer
- Prem Kumar (politician) (born 1960), Indian politician
- R. Sarath Kumar (born 1954), Indian film actor and politician
- Raaj Kumar (1926–1996), Indian film actor
- Rajeev Kumar (IPS) (born 1966), Indian Police Service officer and administrator
- Rajendra Kumar (1929–1999), Indian film actor
- Rajesh Kumar (actor), Indian actor
- Ram Kumar (artist) (born 1924), Indian painter and writer
- Ravinder Kumar, Indian historian
- Ravish Kumar (born 1974), Indian Journalist
- Ritu Kumar, (born 1944), Indian fashion designer

==== S ====
- Sajjan Kumar (born 1945), Indian politician
- Salesh Kumar (born 1981), Fijian footballer
- Salim Kumar (born 1969), Indian film actor
- Sanjay Kumar (born 1962), Sri Lankan businessman
- Sanjeev Kumar (1938–1985), Indian film actor
- Santosh Kumar, real name: Syed Musa Raza (1925–1982), Pakistani film actor
- Satish Kumar (born 1936), Indian Jain monk and nuclear disarmament advocate
- Shabbir Kumar, Indian playback singer
- Shalini Kumar (born 1980), Indian film actress
- Shanta Kumar (born 1934), Indian politician
- Shivrajkumar (born 1961), Indian film actor
- Shyam Kumar, Indian cricketer
- Sujit Kumar (1934-2010), Indian film actor and producer
- Sushil Kumar (admiral) (1940–2019), Indian Navy admiral
- Sushil Kumar (wrestler) (born 1983), Indian wrestler

==== T–U ====
- Tarun Kumar (born 1983), Indian film actor
- Tulsi Kumar, Indian playback singer
- Uttam Kumar (1926–1980), Bengali film actor, director and producer
- U. Vimal Kumar, Indian badminton player

==== V–Z ====
- Vaman Kumar (born 1935), Indian cricketer
- Vedhika Kumar (born 1982), Indian film actress
- Vijender Kumar (born 1985), Indian boxer
- Vijay Kumar (sport shooter), Indian sport shooter
- Vineet Kumar, Indian theatre, television and film actor
- V. Kumar (1934–1996), Indian film score composer
- V. R. Naren Kumar, Indian rally driver
- Yukteshwar Kumar (born 1970), Indian sinologist

== See also ==
- Raj Kumar (disambiguation)
- Sai Kumar (disambiguation)
- Ananth Kumar (disambiguation)
