= 1985 Asian Badminton Championships – Men's team =

Badminton championship in Hyderabad, India

Men's team at the 1985 Asian Badminton Championships
- Venue: Stadium Negara
- Location: Kuala Lumpur, Malaysia
- Dates: 15 – 18 April 1985

The men's team tournament at the 1985 Asian Badminton Championships, also known as the Tunku Abdul Rahman Cup (Malay: Piala Tunku Abdul Rahman) took place from 15 to 18 April 1985 at Stadium Negara in Kuala Lumpur, Malaysia. A total of 16 teams competed in this event.

Bangladesh and Nepal both failed to arrive at the venue in time, thus had to concede their matches to their opponents.

== Results ==
=== Bracket ===
Round of 16
Indonesia	5
Sri Lanka	0
Thailand	3
Philippines	2
China	w/o
Bangladesh
Singapore	5
Brunei	0
Nepal
India	w/o
Hong Kong	0
South Korea	5
Bahrain	0
Japan	5
Pakistan	0
Malaysia	5

Quarter-finals
Indonesia	5
Thailand	0
China	5
Singapore	0
India	0
South Korea	5
Japan	0
Malaysia	5

Semi-finals
Indonesia	1
China	4
South Korea	2
Malaysia	3

Final
China	4
Malaysia	1
Third place
Indonesia	4
South Korea	1

=== Round of 16 ===
Singapore
5
Stadium Negara
15 April 1985

Brunei
0

			1	2	3
1	(Singapore) (Brunei)	Wong Shoon Keat; Wahab Moksin	15; 4	15; 2
2	(Singapore) (Brunei)	Benson Wong; Dallan Foo	15; 4	15; 5
3	(Singapore) (Brunei)	Wong Shoon Keat / Wong Shoon Soo; John Lu / Michael Lu	15; 11	15; 6
4	(Singapore) (Brunei)	Wong Shoon Keat; Dallan Foo				w/o
5	(Singapore) (Brunei)	Benson Wong; Wahab Moksin				w/o

Indonesia
5
Stadium Negara
15 April 1985

Sri Lanka
0

			1	2	3
1	(Indonesia) (Sri Lanka)	Hendry Saputra; Niroshan Wijekoon	15; 2	15; 10
2	(Indonesia) (Sri Lanka)	Kurniahu; Udaya Weerakoon	15; 5	15; 3
3	(Indonesia) (Sri Lanka)	Sigit Pamungkas / Icuk Sugiarto; Udaya Weerakoon / Niroshan Wijekoon	15; 0	15; 0
4	(Indonesia) (Sri Lanka)	Hendry Saputra; Udaya Weerakoon				w/o
5	(Indonesia) (Sri Lanka)	Kurniahu; Niroshan Wijekoon				w/o

Thailand
5
Stadium Negara
15 April 1985

Philippines
0

			1	2	3
1	(Thailand) (Philippines)	Sawei Chanseorasmee; Jessie Alonzo	15; 1	15; 2
2	(Thailand) (Philippines)	Vacharapan Khamthong; Salvador Banquilles	15; 4	15; 8
3	(Thailand) (Philippines)	Prapas Chamsrithong / Somkiat Sonthinen; Jessie Alonzo / Errol Chan	15; 9	15; 7
4	(Thailand) (Philippines)	Sawei Chanseorasmee; Salvador Banquilles				w/o
5	(Thailand) (Philippines)	Vacharapan Khamthong; Jessie Alonzo				w/o

Malaysia
5
Stadium Negara
15 April 1985

Pakistan
0

			1	2	3
1	(Malaysia) (Pakistan)	Misbun Sidek; Sher Afghan	15; 9	15; 4
2	(Malaysia) (Pakistan)	Ong Beng Teong; Abdul Moqueet	15; 2	15; 7
3	(Malaysia) (Pakistan)	Jalani Sidek / Soh Goon Chup; Sher Afghan / Abdul Moqueet	15; 0	15; 9
4	(Malaysia) (Pakistan)	Misbun Sidek; Abdul Moqueet				w/o
5	(Malaysia) (Pakistan)	Ong Beng Teong; Sher Afghan				w/o

Japan
5
Stadium Negara
15 April 1985

Bahrain
0

			1	2	3
1	(Japan) (Bahrain)	Shinji Matsuura; Ali Fakhroo	15; 1	15; 1
2	(Japan) (Bahrain)	Shuji Matsuno; Hisham Al-Khan	15; 3	15; 3
3	(Japan) (Bahrain)	Yasumasa Tsujita / Tatsuya Yanagiya; Hisham Al-Khan / Khalid Hamza	15; 1	15; 8
4	(Japan) (Bahrain)	Shinji Matsuura; Hisham Al-Khan				w/o
5	(Japan) (Bahrain)	Shuji Matsuno; Ali Fakhroo				w/o

South Korea
5
Stadium Negara
15 April 1985

Hong Kong
0

			1	2	3
1	(South Korea) (Hong Kong)	Park Joo-bong; Chan Chi Choi	15; 11	12; 15	15; 3
2	(South Korea) (Hong Kong)	Sung Han-kook; Yeung Yik Kei	15; 9	15; 7
3	(South Korea) (Hong Kong)	Kim Moon-soo / Lee Deuk-choon; Poon Fai Chung / Chan Siu Kwong	15; 3	15; 3
4	(South Korea) (Hong Kong)	Park Joo-bong; Yeung Yik Kei				w/o
5	(South Korea) (Hong Kong)	Sung Han-kook; Chan Chi Choi				w/o

=== Quarter-finals ===
China
5
Stadium Negara
16 April 1985

Singapore
0

			1	2	3
1	(China) (Singapore)	Zhao Jianhua; Wong Shoon Keat	15; 11	15; 9
2	(China) (Singapore)	Yang Yang; Benson Wong	15; 5	15; 1
3	(China) (Singapore)	Zhang Qiang / Zhou Jincan; Wong Shoon Keat / Wong Shoon Soo	15; 2	15; 8
4	(China) (Singapore)	Zhao Jianhua; Benson Wong				w/o
5	(China) (Singapore)	Yang Yang; Wong Shoon Keat				w/o

Indonesia
5
Stadium Negara
16 April 1985

Thailand
0

			1	2	3
1	(Indonesia) (Thailand)	Icuk Sugiarto; Sawei Chanseorasmee	15; 4	15; 5
2	(Indonesia) (Thailand)	Hendry Saputra; Vacharapan Khamthong	15; 7	15; 3
3	(Indonesia) (Thailand)	Sigit Pamungkas / Icuk Sugiarto; Sawei Chanseorasmee / Pramote Teerawiwatana	15; 11	15; 12
4	(Indonesia) (Thailand)	Icuk Sugiarto; Vacharapan Khamthong				w/o
5	(Indonesia) (Thailand)	Hendry Saputra; Sawei Chanseorasmee				w/o

Malaysia
5
Stadium Negara
16 April 1985

Japan
0

			1	2	3
1	(Malaysia) (Japan)	Misbun Sidek; Shinji Matsuura	15; 8	15; 9
2	(Malaysia) (Japan)	Ong Beng Teong; Shuji Matsuno	15; 8	15; 4
3	(Malaysia) (Japan)	Jalani Sidek / Razif Sidek; Yasumasa Tsujita / Tatsuya Yanagiya	15; 7	15; 6
4	(Malaysia) (Japan)	Misbun Sidek; Shuji Matsuno				w/o
5	(Malaysia) (Japan)	Ong Beng Teong; Shinji Matsuura				w/o

South Korea
5
Stadium Negara
16 April 1985

India
0

			1	2	3
1	(South Korea) (India)	Park Joo-bong; U. Vimal Kumar	15; 1	15; 2
2	(South Korea) (India)	Sung Han-kook; Uday Pawar	15; 10	15; 6
3	(South Korea) (India)	Kim Moon-soo / Lee Deuk-choon; Leroy D'Sa / Sanat Misra	15; 10	15; 10
4	(South Korea) (India)	Park Joo-bong; U. Vimal Kumar				w/o
5	(South Korea) (India)	Sung Han-kook; Uday Pawar				w/o

=== Semi-finals ===
Indonesia
1
Stadium Negara
17 April 1985

China
4

			1	2	3
1	(Indonesia) (China)	Hendry Saputra; Zhao Jianhua	15; 17	17; 14	15; 6
2	(Indonesia) (China)	Kurniahu; Yang Yang	5; 15	9; 15
3	(Indonesia) (China)	Sigit Pamungkas / Icuk Sugiarto; Zhang Qiang / Zhou Jincan	4; 15	9; 15
4	(Indonesia) (China)	Hendry Saputra; Yang Yang	10; 15	14; 17
5	(Indonesia) (China)	Kurniahu; Zhao Jianhua				w/o

Malaysia
3
Stadium Negara
17 April 1985

South Korea
2

			1	2	3
1	(Malaysia) (South Korea)	Misbun Sidek; Park Joo-bong	15; 10	8; 15	18; 16
2	(Malaysia) (South Korea)	Ong Beng Teong; Sung Han-kook	15; 10	15; 9
3	(Malaysia) (South Korea)	Jalani Sidek / Razif Sidek; Kim Moon-soo / Park Joo-bong	15; 17	13; 15
4	(Malaysia) (South Korea)	Misbun Sidek; Sung Han-kook	10; 15	9; 15
5	(Malaysia) (South Korea)	Ong Beng Teong; Park Joo-bong	15; 11	15; 11

=== Third place ===
Indonesia
4
Stadium Negara
18 April 1985

South Korea
1

			1	2	3
1	(Indonesia) (South Korea)	Icuk Sugiarto; Choi Byung-hak	15; 7	15; 8
2	(Indonesia) (South Korea)	Kurniahu; Lee Sang-hee	15; 9	15; 9
3	(Indonesia) (South Korea)	Sigit Pamungkas / Hendry Saputra; Kim Moon-soo / Lee Deuk-choon	8; 15	10; 15
4	(Indonesia) (South Korea)	Icuk Sugiarto; Lee Sang-hee	15; 9	15; 0
5	(Indonesia) (South Korea)	Kurniahu; Choi Byung-hak				w/o

=== Final ===
China
4
Stadium Negara
18 April 1985

Malaysia
1

			1	2	3
1	(China) (Malaysia)	Zhao Jianhua; Misbun Sidek	14; 18	17; 14	17; 15
2	(China) (Malaysia)	Yang Yang; Ong Beng Teong	15; 10	15; 11
3	(China) (Malaysia)	Zhang Qiang / Zhou Jincan; Jalani Sidek / Razif Sidek	7; 15	12; 15
4	(China) (Malaysia)	Yang Yang; Misbun Sidek	15; 8	15; 8
5	(China) (Malaysia)	Zhao Jianhua; Ong Beng Teong	15; 6	15; 10
