= Anand Kumar (disambiguation) =

Anand Kumar (born 1973) is an Indian mathematician.

Anand Kumar may also refer to:

- Anand Kumar (director) (born 1970), Indian film director
- Anand Kumar (sociologist) (born 1950), Indian sociologist and politician
- Anand Kumar (UP politician)

== See also ==
- Ananth Kumar (disambiguation)
