= Sai Kumar =

Sai Kumar or Saikumar is the name of:

- Sai Kumar (Malayalam actor) (born 1963), Indian actor in Malayalam language films
- P. Sai Kumar (born 1960), Indian actor in Telugu, Tamil, and Kannada language films
