= Ananth Kumar (disambiguation) =

Ananth Kumar (1959–2018) was an Indian politician.

Ananth Kumar may also refer to:

- Anant Kumar (author) (born September 28, 1969), German author, translator and literary critic of Indian descent
- Ananth Kumar Hegde (born 1968), Indian politician

== See also ==
- Anand Kumar (disambiguation)
