= Kim Joong-soo =

South Korean badminton player

- Hangul: 김중수
- Hanja: 金重洙
- RR: Gim Jungsu
- MR: Kim Chungsu

Kim Joong-soo (born 17 April 1960) is a South Korean former badminton player and coach. He now serves as Badminton World Federation director, Badminton Asia president, and Badminton Korea Association vice-chairman.

Kim was a member of the Korean men's team that won gold at the 1986 Asian Games.

== Post retirements ==
Kim is better known as a coach. After several years coaching the national team in the 1990s, he became the head coach of the national team after the Sydney Olympics and held the post until he was replaced by Sung Han-kook in December 2010. He served briefly as the interim head coach after Sung was dismissed in August 2012 but in early 2013, Lee Deuk-choon was named as a permanent replacement.

In May 2021, Kim was elected as a director of the Badminton World Federation (BWF), with the term of office is until 2025.

At the 2023 Badminton Asia general meeting, Kim was elected as a president of Badminton Asia with 29 votes out of 40 countries. He will serve until 2027.

== Personal life ==
In 1991, Kim married two-time World Champion Chung Myung-hee.

== Achievements ==
=== IBF World Grand Prix ===
The World Badminton Grand Prix sanctioned by International Badminton Federation (IBF) from 1983 to 2006.

Men's doubles

| Year | Tournament | Partner | Opponent | Score | Result |
|---|---|---|---|---|---|
| 1986 | Chinese Taipei Open | (South Korea) Lee Deuk-choon | (Malaysia) Jalani Sidek (Malaysia) Razif Sidek | 4–15, 5–15 | (silver) Runner-up |
