= Nikhil Kumar =

Nikhil Kumar may refer to:

- Nikhil Kumar (governor), IPS officer-turned politician, governor of Nagaland, and of Kerala
- Nikhil Kumar (actor), Indian actor and politician
- Nikhil Kumar (table tennis), American table tennis player
- Nikhil Kumar (chess player), American chess player
