= Ib Frederiksen =

Danish badminton player

Personal information
- Born: Ib Frederiksen; 7 May 1964 (age 62) Skive, Denmark
- Height: 186 cm (6 ft 1 in)

Sport
- Country: Denmark
- Sport: Badminton
- Handedness: Right
- Event: Men's singles

Men's singles
- BWF profile
Medal record
Men's badminton
Representing Denmark
Thomas Cup
Bronze medal – third place	1990 Tokyo	Men's team
European Championships
Silver medal – second place	1986 Uppsala	Men's singles
European Mixed Team Championships
Gold medal – first place	1986 Uppsala	Mixed team

Ib Frederiksen is a former Danish badminton player.

== Career ==
Frederiksen competed at the 1987 IBF World Championships, and he was defeated in the quarterfinals by Yang Yang, of China. He won the 1988 All England Open Badminton Championships in men's singles beating Jens Peter Nierhoff in the semifinal and Morten Frost in the final 8–15, 15–7, 15–10.

== Achievements ==
=== European Championships ===
Men's singles
Year	Venue	Opponent	Score	Result
1986	Fyrishallen, Uppsala, Sweden	(Denmark) Morten Frost	8–15, 2–15	Silver

=== IBF World Grand Prix ===
The World Badminton Grand Prix was sanctioned by the International Badminton Federation (IBF) from 1983 to 2006.

Men's singles
Year	Tournament	Opponent	Score	Result
1984	Dutch Open	(Denmark) Jens Peter Nierhoff	15–12, 9–15, 16–18	(silver) Runner-up
1985	Canadian Open	(Denmark) Jens Peter Nierhoff	6–15, 2–15	(silver) Runner-up
1986	Japan Open	(China) Yang Yang	15–5, 6–15, 8–15	(silver) Runner-up
1986	Dutch Open	(England) Steve Baddeley	18–15, 8–15, 15–2	(gold) Winner
1987	German Open	(England) Darren Hall	16–17, 15–4, 6–15	(silver) Runner-up
1987	French Open	(Indonesia) Hermawan Susanto	15–2, 15–4	(gold) Winner
1988	Poona Open	(Denmark) Morten Frost	10–15, 9–15	(silver) Runner-up
1988	All England Open	(Denmark) Morten Frost	8–15, 15–7, 15–10	(gold) Winner
1990	Scottish Open	(England) Anders Nielsen	18–15, 15–7	(gold) Winner
1991	Swiss Open	(Sweden) Pär-Gunnar Jönsson	17–18, 15–3, 7–15	(silver) Runner-up
