= Michael Scandolera =

Australian badminton player

Personal information
- Born: 19 August 1959 (age 67)

Sport
- Country: Australia
- Sport: Badminton
- Handedness: Right
- BWF profile
Medal record
Men's badminton
Representing Australia
Commonwealth Games
Gold medal – first place	1986 Glasgow	Mixed doubles
Bronze medal – third place	1986 Glasgow	Mixed team

Michael George "Mike" Scandolera (born 19 August 1959) is an Australian badminton player.

Scandolera took part in the 1989 Badminton World Championships. He achieved a world ranking of 17 in the men's doubles and 65 in the men's singles. At the 1986 Commonwealth Games he won the bronze medal with the Australian team and the gold medal in the mixed doubles with Audrey Tuckey. Four years earlier he won another bronze medal with the Australian team at the Commonwealth Games. This was the first ever Commonwealth Games badminton gold medal won by an Australian.

== Results ==
Year	Tournament	Event	Rank	Name
1982	Commonwealth Games	Team	3	Australia
1982	Australian Championships	Mixed doubles	1	Mike Scandolera / Maxine Evans
1986	Commonwealth Games	Mixed doubles	1	Mike Scandolera / Audrey Tuckey
1986	Commonwealth Games	Team	3	Australia
1989	World Championships	Men's singles	65	Mike Scandolera
1989	World Championships	Men's doubles	17	Mike Scandolera / Gordon Lang
