= Rodney Barton =

American badminton player

Personal information
- Nationality: American
- Education: Arizona State University

Sport
- Sport: Badminton

Achievements and titles
- National finals: 1983 U.S National Men's Singles Champion; 1984 U.S National Men's Singles Champion

Rodney Barton is an American badminton player. He was the U.S. National Badminton Men's Champion in 1983 and 1984. He attended Palo Alto High School. He is African American.
