= Alex White (badminton) =

Scottish international badminton player

Personal information
- Nationality: British (Scottish)
- Born: 7 June 1961

Sport
- Sport: Badminton
- Club: Kilmarnock
Medal record
Representing Scotland
Scottish Nationals
Gold medal – first place	1984, 85	singles
Gold medal – first place	1987, 88	doubles
Irish Open
Gold medal – first place	1986, 87, 88	singles
Gold medal – first place	1986, 87, 88	doubles

Alexander White (born 7 June 1961) is a former international badminton player from Scotland who competed at three Commonwealth Games.

== Biography ==
White was based in Kilmarnock and represented Scotland at international level. In 1981, White was the national U21 champion and made his international debut in November 1981 in the Thomas Cup.

White represented the Scottish team at the 1982 Commonwealth Games in Brisbane, Australia, where he competed in the badminton events. The following year he won his first international title in June 1983, winning the Portuguese Open doubles with Billy Gilliland.

White became licensed in 1986, which allowed prize money to go into a trust fund administered by the Scottish Badminton Union. Also in 1986 he represented his nation at the European Championships.

He was twice singles champion and twice doubles champion with Iain Pringle, at the Scottish National Badminton Championships. Additionally, he was the three times singles and doubles champion at the Irish Open.

White went on to represent Scotland at both the 1986 Commonwealth Games and 1990 Commonwealth Games.
