= Iain Pringle =

Scottish international badminton player

Personal information
- Nationality: British (Scottish)
- Born: c.1961

Sport
- Sport: Badminton
- Club: Paisley
Medal record
Representing Scotland
Scottish Nationals
Gold medal – first place	1987, 88	doubles
Irish Open
Gold medal – first place	1987, 88	doubles

Iain Pringle (born c.1961) is a former international badminton player from Scotland who competed at the Commonwealth Games.

== Biography ==
Pringle was based in Paisley and represented Scotland at international level.

In 1986 he represented his nation at the European Championships and represented the Scottish team at the 1986 Commonwealth Games in Edinburgh, Scotland, where he competed in the badminton events.

He was twice doubles champion, partnering Alex White, at the Scottish National Badminton Championships in 1987 and 1988. Additionally, he won the doubles title, with White, at the Irish Open during the same two seasons.

In 1989 he won the Highland doubles with Dan Travers and in February 1996 he collected his 50th international cap.
