= U. Vimal Kumar =

Indian badminton player

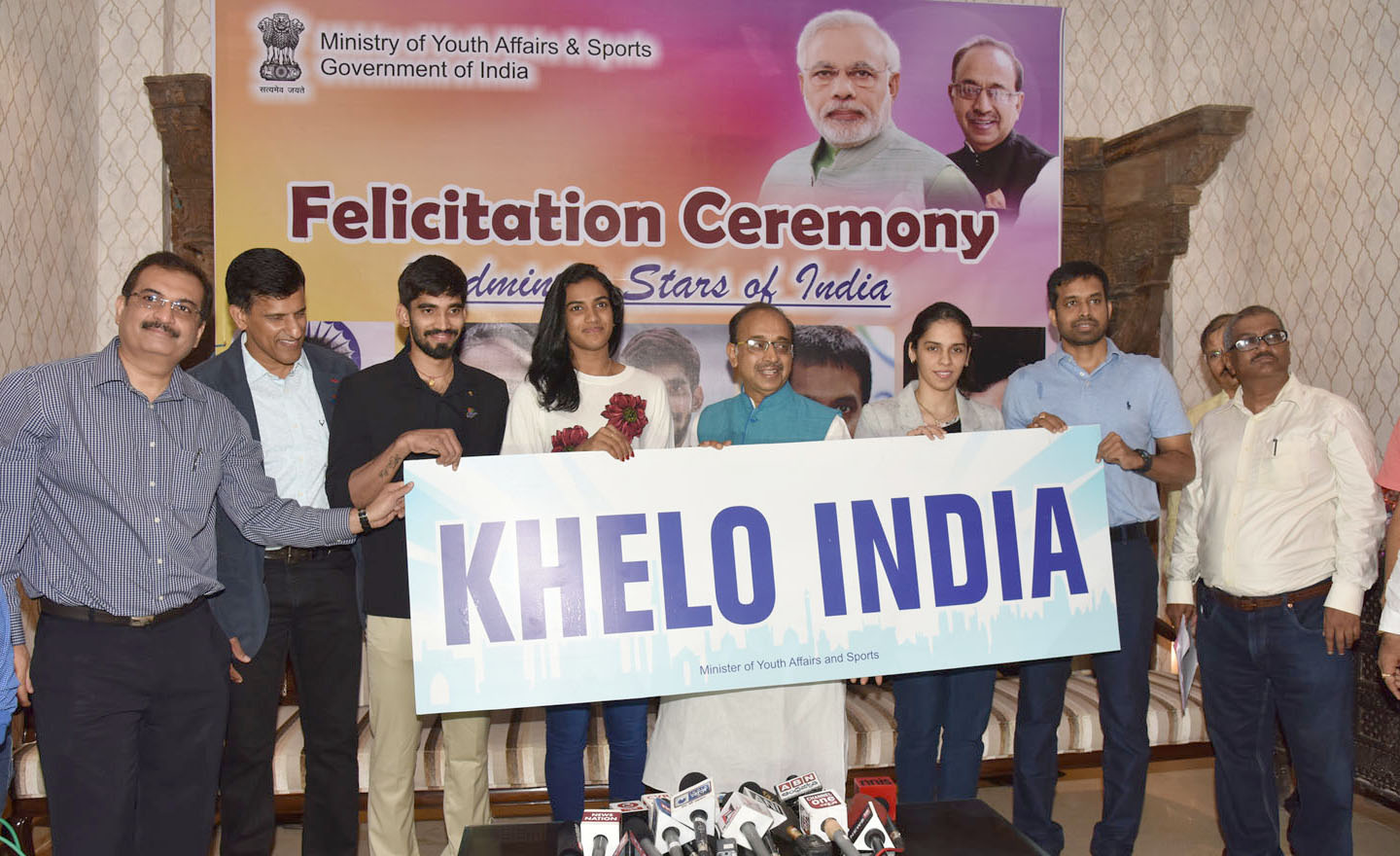

Personal information
- Born: 19 November 1962 (age 64) Trivandrum, Kerala
- Height: 1.84 m (6 ft 0 in)
- Weight: 78 kg (172 lb)

Sport
- Country: India
- Sport: Badminton
- Handedness: Right
- BWF profile
Medal record
Men's badminton
Representing India
Asian Games
Bronze medal – third place	1986 Seoul	Men's team

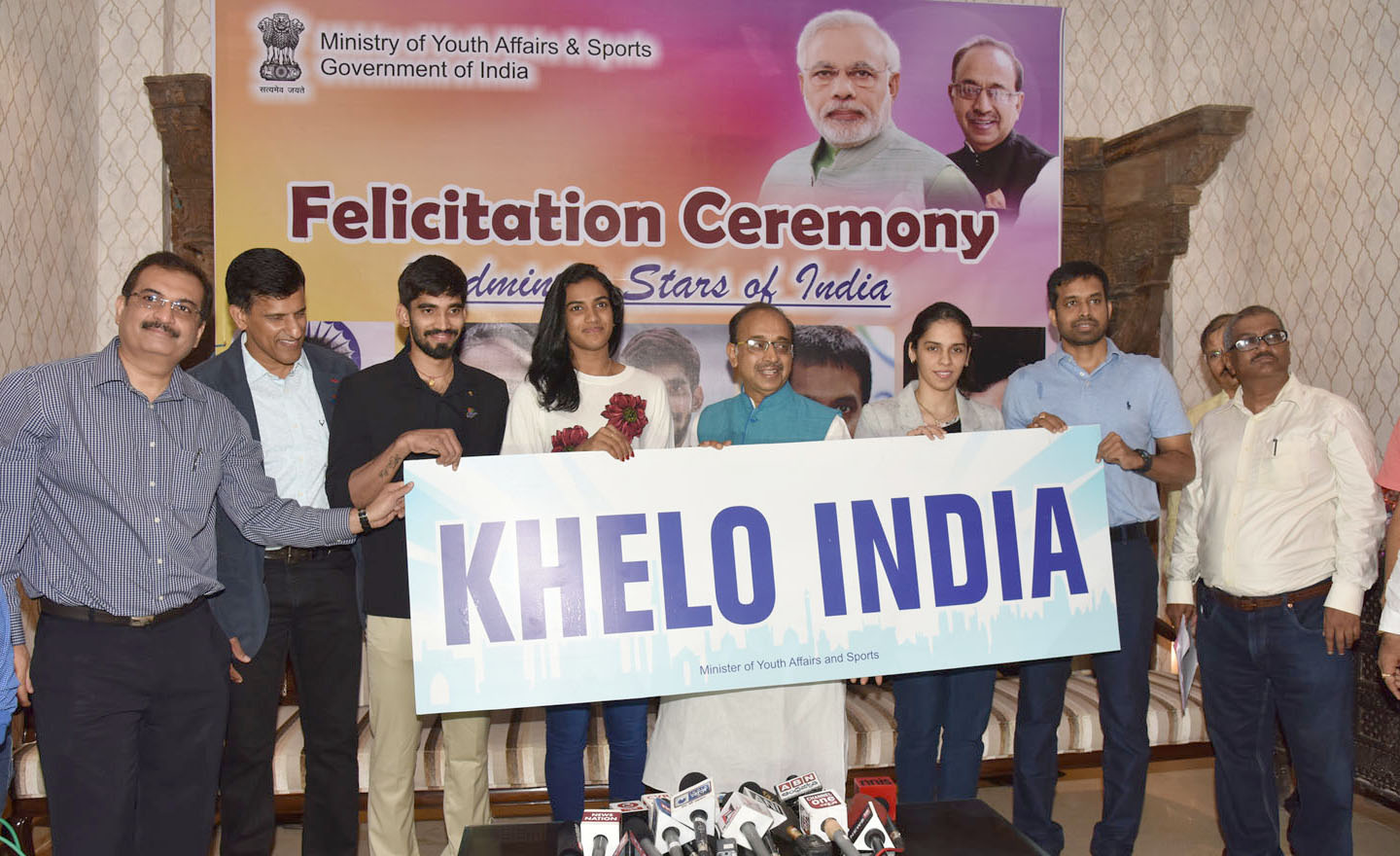

U. Vimal Kumar (born 19 November 1962) is an Indian former badminton player. He won the Indian National title consecutively for two years, 1988 and 1989. He also served as Chief National Coach of India. He is the Co Founder, Director and Chief Coach in Prakash Padukone Badminton Academy. He was awarded the Dronacharya Award in 2019. He was the bronze medalist in badminton at the 1986 Asian Games in the Men's team event.

== Career ==
During his career he won French Open in 1983 & 1984 and Welsh International Open in 1988 & 1991. Vimal also represented India at the Barcelona Olympics in 1992, and was ranked within the top 20 in the world. He was the National chief coach of the Indian badminton squad for several years. He quit the post in 2006 to concentrate on coaching youngsters at the Prakash Padukone Badminton Academy. Now, he is currently coaching star player Saina Nehwal in Bangalore.He also coaches Parupalli Kashyap. Malayalam film actor Kalidas Jayaram is his nephew.

== Achievements ==
=== IBF International ===
Men's singles
Year	Tournament	Opponent	Score	Result
1983	French Open	(West Germany) Jürgen Gebhardt	15–5, 15–1	(gold) Winner
1984	French Open	(Pakistan) Tariq Farooq	10–15, 15–6, 15–2	(gold) Winner
1987	Bells Open	(Denmark) Torben Carlsen	15–6, 5–15, 9–15	(silver) Runner-up
1987	Welsh International	(England) Steve Baddeley	Walkover	(gold) Winner
1989	Amor International	(Denmark) Claus Overbeck	15–12, 13–18, 1–15	(silver) Runner-up
1990	Portugal International	(England) Peter Smith	15–8, 12–15, 3–15	(silver) Runner-up
1990	Strasbourg International			(gold) Winner
1990	Welsh International	(Canada) Iain Sydie	15–11, 15–5	(gold) Winner
1991	Strasbourg International			(gold) Winner

Men's doubles
Year	Tournament	Partner	Opponent	Score	Result
1990	Portugal International	(England) Clive Palmer	(England) Nitin Panesar (England) Steve Smith	15–7, 16–17, 5–15	(silver) Runner-up
