= Shuji Matsuno =

Japanese badminton player

Personal information
- Born: 11 September 1963 (age 63) Yamanashi Prefecture, Japan
- Height: 1.7 m (5 ft 7 in)

Sport
- Country: Japan
- Sport: Badminton
- Handedness: Right
- BWF profile
Medal record
Men's badminton
Representing Japan
World Cup
Bronze medal – third place	1989 Guangzhou	Men's doubles

Shuji Matsuno (松野 修二, Matsuno Shūji; born 11 September 1963) is a Japanese former badminton player and current coach.

== Career ==
After graduating from university, Matsuno joined NTT East Japan (formerly part of NTT) and became a professional badminton player. He primarily partnered with Shinji Matsuura in men's doubles, a collaboration that began during their university days.

Matsuno and Matsuura earned a bronze medal in men's doubles at the 1988 Summer Olympics in Seoul, where badminton was a demonstration sport. At the 1992 Summer Olympics, they finished fifth in men’s doubles and received an Olympic diploma. Additionally, the pair reached the semifinals at the 1987 Japan Open.

== Coaching career ==
Following his retirement from competitive play, Matsuno transitioned into coaching. He served as a coach for the Japanese national team at the 2000 Summer Olympics in Sydney. In 1999, he became the general director of the NTT East Japan badminton team, later holding positions as vice director and general supervisor.

Matsuno later joined the Yonex badminton team, where he has served as general manager and head coach. He has coached several players, including Ayako Sakuramoto, Sayaka Hobara, Rui Hirokami, and Natsuki Nidaira

== Achievements ==
=== World Cup ===
Men's doubles
Year	Venue	Partner	Opponent	Score	Result
1989	Guangzhou Gymnasium; Guangzhou, China	(Japan) Shinji Matsuura	(South Korea) Park Joo-bong (South Korea) Kim Moon-soo	1–15, 9–15	Bronze

=== IBF World Grand Prix ===
The World Badminton Grand Prix sanctioned by International Badminton Federation (IBF) from 1983 to 2006.

Men's doubles
Year	Tournament	Partner	Opponent	Score	Result
1987	English Masters	Shinji Matsuura	(Malaysia) Razif Sidek (Malaysia) Jalani Sidek	11–15, 9–15	(silver) Runner-up
