= Sanat Misra =

Indian badminton player

Personal information
- Born: 1962 Cuttack, Odisha, India
- Died: 17 June 2006 (aged 44) Bhubaneswar, Odisha

Sport
- Country: India
- Sport: Badminton
Medal record
Representing India
Men's badminton
Asian Games
| Bronze medal – third place | 1986 Seoul | Men's team |

Sanat Misra also spelt Mishra (1962 – 17 June 2006) was an Indian badminton player. He was the national doubles champion and mixed doubles champion. He was the bronze medalist in badminton at the 1986 Asian Games in the Men's team event.
