= Shinji Matsuura =

Japanese badminton player

Personal information
- Born: 15 February 1964 (age 62) Shiga Prefecture, Japan
- Height: 1.83 m (6 ft 0 in)

Sport
- Country: Japan
- Sport: Badminton
- Handedness: Right
- BWF profile
Medal record
Men's badminton
Representing Japan
World Cup
Bronze medal – third place	1989 Guangzhou	Men's doubles

Shinji Matsuura (松浦 進二, Matsuura Shinji; born February 15, 1964) is a retired male badminton player from Japan.

== Career ==
Matsuura competed in badminton at the 1992 Summer Olympics in the men's doubles with Shuji Matsuno. They lost in quarterfinals to Razif Sidek and Jalani Sidek, of Malaysia, 5–15, 4–15.

== Achievements ==
=== World Cup ===
Men's doubles
Year	Venue	Partner	Opponent	Score	Result
1989	Guangzhou Gymnasium; Guangzhou, China	(Japan) Shuji Matsuno	(South Korea) Park Joo-bong (South Korea) Kim Moon-soo	1–15, 9–15	Bronze

=== IBF World Grand Prix ===
The World Badminton Grand Prix sanctioned by International Badminton Federation (IBF) from 1983 to 2006.

Men's doubles
Year	Tournament	Partner	Opponent	Score	Result
1987	English Masters	Shuji Matsuno	(Malaysia) Razif Sidek (Malaysia) Jalani Sidek	11–15, 9–15	(silver) Runner-up
