= 1983 Asian Badminton Championships – Men's team =

Badminton championship in Hyderabad, India

Men's team at the 1983 Asian Badminton Championships
- Venue: Netaji Indoor Stadium
- Location: Calcutta, India
- Dates: 1 – 5 December 1983

The men's team tournament at the 1983 Asian Badminton Championships, also known as the Tunku Abdul Rahman Cup (Malay: Piala Tunku Abdul Rahman) took place from 1 to 5 December 1983 at the Netaji Indoor Stadium in Calcutta, India. A total of 13 teams competed in this event. Japan received a walkover from Bangladesh after the team failed to arrive at the venue in time.

== Results ==
=== Bracket ===
Round of 16
Malaysia	3
Hong Kong	2
Japan	w/o
Bangladesh
Sri Lanka	0
Pakistan	5
India	3
Nepal	2
South Korea	3
Thailand	2

Quarter-finals
China	3
Malaysia	2
Japan	4
Pakistan	1
India	3
South Korea	2
Brunei	0
Indonesia	5

Semi-finals
China	4
Japan	1
India	3
Indonesia	2

Final
China	3
India	2
Third place
Japan	2
Indonesia	3

=== Round of 16 ===
Malaysia
3
Netaji Indoor Stadium
2 December 1983

Hong Kong
2

			1	2	3
1	(Malaysia) (Hong Kong)	Foo Kok Keong; Chan Chi Choi	15; 12	12; 15	7; 15
2	(Malaysia) (Hong Kong)	Mohd Ajib Mohidin; Yeung Yik Kei	15; 9	15; 9
3	(Malaysia) (Hong Kong)	Leong Wee Chan / Soh Goon Chup; Chan Chi Choi / Wong Yung	15; 4	15; 5
4	(Malaysia) (Hong Kong)	Foo Kok Keong; Yeung Yik Kei	15; 0	15; 10
5	(Malaysia) (Hong Kong)	Mohd Ajib Mohidin; Chan Chi Choi				w/o

Pakistan
5
Netaji Indoor Stadium
2 December 1983

Sri Lanka
0

			1	2	3
1	(Pakistan) (Sri Lanka)	Tariq Wadood; Priyantha Wijesekera	15; 4	15; 3
2	(Pakistan) (Sri Lanka)	Sher Afghan; Niroshan Wijekoon	12; 15	15; 8	15; 5
3	(Pakistan) (Sri Lanka)	Zahid Maqbool / Tariq Wadood; Vijitha de Silva / Ranjith Weerasinghe	15; 1	15; 6
4	(Pakistan) (Sri Lanka)	Sher Afghan; Priyantha Wijesekera	15; 8	14; 18	17; 16
5	(Pakistan) (Sri Lanka)	Tariq Wadood; Niroshan Wijekoon				w/o

India
3
Netaji Indoor Stadium
2 December 1983

Nepal
2

			1	2	3
1	(India) (Nepal)	Syed Modi; Pratap Adhikari	15; 7	15; 1
2	(India) (Nepal)	Partho Ganguli; Prakash Rana	15; 7	17; 15
3	(India) (Nepal)	Pradeep Gandhe / Uday Pawar; Prakash Rana / Naresh Bahadur Singh	15; 3	15; 1
4	(India) (Nepal)	Syed Modi; Prakash Rana				w/o
5	(India) (Nepal)	Partho Ganguli; Pratap Adhikari				w/o

South Korea
3
Netaji Indoor Stadium
2 December 1983

Thailand
2

			1	2	3
1	(South Korea) (Thailand)	Park Joo-bong; Sarit Pisudchaikul	15; 8	10; 15	15; 5
2	(South Korea) (Thailand)	Sung Han-kook; Sawei Chanseorasmee	15; 11	15; 12
3	(South Korea) (Thailand)	Kim Moon-soo / Lee Deuk-choon; Bandid Jaiyen / Preecha Sopajaree	15; 10	15; 9
4	(South Korea) (Thailand)	Park Joo-bong; Sawei Chanseorasmee				w/o
5	(South Korea) (Thailand)	Sung Han-kook; Sarit Pisudchaikul				w/o

=== Quarter-finals ===
China
3
Netaji Indoor Stadium
3 December 1983

Malaysia
2

			1	2	3
1	(China) (Malaysia)	Chen Changjie; Foo Kok Keong	15; 8	15; 4
2	(China) (Malaysia)	Zhao Jianhua; Mohd Ajib Mohidin	15; 5	15; 9
3	(China) (Malaysia)	He Shangquan / Jiang Guoliang; Leong Wee Chan / Soh Goon Chup	15; 7	15; 3
4	(China) (Malaysia)	Chen Changjie; Mohd Ajib Mohidin				w/o
5	(China) (Malaysia)	Zhao Jianhua; Foo Kok Keong				w/o

Japan
4
Netaji Indoor Stadium
3 December 1983

Pakistan
1

			1	2	3
1	(Japan) (Pakistan)	Shinji Matsuura; Tariq Wadood	3; 15	5; 15
2	(Japan) (Pakistan)	Shuji Matsuno; Sher Afghan	15; 11	15; 3
3	(Japan) (Pakistan)	Tetsuaki Inoue / Shōkichi Miyamori; Zahid Maqbool / Tariq Wadood	15; 11	4; 15	15; 9
4	(Japan) (Pakistan)	Shinji Matsuura; Sher Afghan	15; 0	15; 3
5	(Japan) (Pakistan)	Shuji Matsuno; Tariq Wadood				w/o

India
3
Netaji Indoor Stadium
3 December 1983

South Korea
2

			1	2	3
1	(India) (South Korea)	Prakash Padukone; Park Joo-bong	12; 15	14; 18
2	(India) (South Korea)	Syed Modi; Lee Deuk-choon	15; 7	15; 6
3	(India) (South Korea)	Pradeep Gandhe / Uday Pawar; Kim Moon-soo / Sung Han-kook	5; 15	8; 15
4	(India) (South Korea)	Prakash Padukone; Lee Deuk-choon	15; 5	15; 4
5	(India) (South Korea)	Syed Modi; Park Joo-bong	15; 5	15; 0

Indonesia
5
Netaji Indoor Stadium
3 December 1983

Brunei
0

			1	2	3
1	(Indonesia) (Brunei)	Kurniahu; Michael Leo Vuin Min	15; 0	15; 1
2	(Indonesia) (Brunei)	Eddy Kurniawan; Cheong Chong Keen	15; 4	15; 3
3	(Indonesia) (Brunei)	Hadibowo / Chafidz Yusuf; Ishak Mohammad / Hasri Ghafar	15; 3	15; 1
4	(Indonesia) (Brunei)	Kurniahu; Cheong Chong Keen				w/o
5	(Indonesia) (Brunei)	Eddy Kurniawan; Michael Leo Vuin Min				w/o

=== Semi-finals ===
China
4
Netaji Indoor Stadium
4 December 1983

Japan
1

			1	2	3
1	(China) (Japan)	Chen Changjie; Shinji Matsuura	15; 3	15; 1
2	(China) (Japan)	Wei Yan; Shuji Matsuno	15; 3	15; 11
3	(China) (Japan)	Sun Zhian / Zhao Jianhua; Tetsuaki Inoue / Shōkichi Miyamori	5; 15	15; 3	15; 6
4	(China) (Japan)	Chen Changjie; Shuji Matsuno				w/o
5	(China) (Japan)	Wei Yan; Shinji Matsuura	15; 7	15; 7

Indonesia
2
Netaji Indoor Stadium
4 December 1983

India
3

			1	2	3
1	(Indonesia) (India)	Kurniahu; Prakash Padukone	11; 15	5; 15
2	(Indonesia) (India)	Eddy Kurniawan; Syed Modi	10; 15	15; 5	14; 17
3	(Indonesia) (India)	Hadibowo / Chafidz Yusuf; Leroy D'Sa / Uday Pawar	15; 6	15; 10
4	(Indonesia) (India)	Kurniahu; Syed Modi	9; 15	7; 15
5	(Indonesia) (India)	Eddy Kurniawan; Prakash Padukone				w/o

=== Third place ===
Indonesia
3
Netaji Indoor Stadium
5 December 1983

Japan
2

			1	2	3
1	(Indonesia) (Japan)	Kurniahu; Shinji Matsuura	4; 15	15; 6	15; 10
2	(Indonesia) (Japan)	Eddy Kurniawan; Shuji Matsuno	15; 4	15; 3
3	(Indonesia) (Japan)	Hadibowo / Chafidz Yusuf; Tetsuaki Inoue / Shōkichi Miyamori	15; 5	15; 7
4	(Indonesia) (Japan)	Kurniahu; Shuji Matsuno				w/o
5	(Indonesia) (Japan)	Eddy Kurniawan; Shinji Matsuura				w/o

=== Final ===
China
3
Netaji Indoor Stadium
5 December 1983

India
2

			1	2	3
1	(China) (India)	Chen Changjie; Prakash Padukone	15; 8	15; 8
2	(China) (India)	Zhao Jianhua; Syed Modi	15; 1	18; 14
3	(China) (India)	He Shangquan / Jiang Guoliang; Leroy D'Sa / Uday Pawar	15; 2	15; 11
4	(China) (India)	Chen Changjie; Syed Modi				w/o
5	(China) (India)	Zhao Jianhua; Prakash Padukone				w/o
