= 1982 Thomas Cup qualification =

Tournament details
- Dates: 4 August 1981 – 4 April 1982
- Location: Asian zone: Bangkok; Beijing; Hyderabad; Taipei American zone: Claremont; Lima; Kitchener; Pomona; San Diego; European zone: Copenhagen; Duisburg; Grangemouth; Haarlem; Pressbaum Australasian zone: Hamilton

The qualifying process for the 1982 Thomas Cup took place from 4 August 1981 to 4 April 1982 to decide the final teams which will play in the final tournament.

== Qualification process ==
The qualification process is divided into four regions, the Asian Zone, the American Zone, the European Zone and the Australasian Zone. Teams in their respective zone will compete in a knockout format. Teams will compete for two days, with two singles and doubles played on the first day and three singles and two doubles played on the next day. The teams that win their respective zone will earn a place in the final tournament to be held in England.

Indonesia qualified for the inter-zone play-offs as defending champions and hosts. England qualified for their first ever appearance in the Thomas Cup as hosts.

=== Qualified teams ===
Country	Qualified as	Qualified on	Final appearance
England	1982 Thomas Cup hosts	24 July 1981	1st
Indonesia	1979 Thomas Cup winners	2 June 1979	9th
China	Asian Zone winners	5 March 1982	1st
Denmark	European Zone winners	18 February 1982	12th
Japan	American Zone winners	4 April 1982	4th
Malaysia	Australasian Zone winners	8 August 1981	9th

== Asian Zone ==
=== Bracket ===
First round
26 October 1981 – Beijing
China	9
Pakistan	0
31 October 1981 – Hyderabad
India	9
Sri Lanka	0
5 December 1981 – Taipei
South Korea	6
Chinese Taipei	3
2 October 1981 – Bangkok
Thailand	8
Singapore	1

Semi-finals
30 January 1982 – Beijing
China	9
India	0
30 January 1982 – Bangkok
South Korea	2
Thailand	8

Final
4 March 1982 – Bangkok
China	7
Thailand	2

=== First round ===
Thailand
8
Bangkok, Thailand
2–3 October 1981

Singapore
1

			1	2	3
1	(Thailand) (Singapore)	Udom Luangpetcharaporn; Wong Shoon Keat	17; 14	15; 9
2	(Thailand) (Singapore)	Surapong Suharitdamrong; Lee Ah Ngo	3; 15	15; 13	15; 12
3	(Thailand) (Singapore)	Sakchai Thanasriwanijai / Kriangsak Traiwekin; Tan Eng Han / Tan Khee Wee	15; 8	12; 15	14; 17
4	(Thailand) (Singapore)	Pinit Boonoon / Surapong Suharitdamrong; Robert Han / Lee Ah Ngo	15; 17	15; 4	15; 10
5	(Thailand) (Singapore)	Surapong Suharitdamrong; Wong Shoon Keat	15; 7	15; 11
6	(Thailand) (Singapore)	Udom Luangpetcharaporn; Lee Ah Ngo	15; 13	15; 6
7	(Thailand) (Singapore)	Akkaraporn Sriratanakul; Tan Ban Chew	18; 4	15; 2
8	(Thailand) (Singapore)	Pinit Boonoon / Surapong Suharitdamrong; Tan Eng Han / Tan Khee Wee	10; 15	15; 2	15; 5
9	(Thailand) (Singapore)	Sakchai Thanasriwanijai / Kriangsak Traiwekin; Robert Han / Lee Ah Ngo	15; 12	15; 3

China
9
Beijing, China
26–27 October 1981

Pakistan
0

			1	2	3
1	(China) (Pakistan)	Han Jian; Tariq Wadood	15; 9	15; 9
2	(China) (Pakistan)	Chen Tianlong; Tariq Farooq	15; 5	15; 5
3	(China) (Pakistan)	Sun Zhian / Yao Ximing; Javed Iqbal / Zahid Maqbool	15; 5	15; 4
4	(China) (Pakistan)	Lin Jiangli / Luan Jin; Asif Bajwa / Tariq Wadood	15; 4	15; 2
5	(China) (Pakistan)	Luan Jin; Zubair Ahmed	15; 4	15; 0
6	(China) (Pakistan)	Chen Tianlong; Tariq Wadood	18; 14	4; 15	15; 10
7	(China) (Pakistan)	Han Jian; Tariq Farooq	15; 4	15; 5
8	(China) (Pakistan)	Lin Jiangli / Luan Jin; Javed Iqbal / Zahid Maqbool	15; 5	15; 8
9	(China) (Pakistan)	Sun Zhian / Yao Ximing; Asif Bajwa / Tariq Wadood	15; 4	15; 3

India
9
Hyderabad, India
31 October – 1 November 1981

Sri Lanka
0

			1	2	3
1	(India) (Sri Lanka)	Syed Modi; Ravi Kuruppu	15; 1	15; 5
2	(India) (Sri Lanka)	U. Vimal Kumar; Priyantha Wijesekara	15; 8	17; 16
3	(India) (Sri Lanka)	Leroy D'Sa / Sanat Misra; Malik Jhan / Ravi Kuruppu	15; 1	15; 5
4	(India) (Sri Lanka)	Uday Pawar / Sanjay Sharma; Niroshan Wijekoon / D. Wijesooriya	15; 3	15; 1
5	(India) (Sri Lanka)	Uday Pawar; Malik Jhan	15; 2	15; 4
6	(India) (Sri Lanka)	U. Vimal Kumar; Ravi Kuruppu	15; 5	15; 3
7	(India) (Sri Lanka)	Syed Modi; Priyantha Wijesekara	18; 14	15; 4
8	(India) (Sri Lanka)	Leroy D'Sa / Sanat Misra; Niroshan Wijekoon / D. Wijesooriya	15; 7	15; 4
9	(India) (Sri Lanka)	Uday Pawar / Sanjay Sharma; Malik Jhan / Ravi Kuruppu	15; 3	15; 4

South Korea
6
Taipei, Taiwan
5–6 December 1981

Chinese Taipei
3

			1	2	3
1	(South Korea) (Chinese Taipei)	Kim Byung-sik; Huang Chien-tung	8; 15	15; 10	15; 10
2	(South Korea) (Chinese Taipei)	Park Joo-bong; Liu Han-chia	15; 8	14; 17	15; 10
3	(South Korea) (Chinese Taipei)	Kim Joong-soo / Lee Jae-bok; Chi Shih-ching / Ho Chien-tung	5; 15	15; 8	8; 15
4	(South Korea) (Chinese Taipei)	Lee Eun-ku / Park Joo-bong; Liu Han-chia / Tseng Hsueh-chih	15; 7	15; 9
5	(South Korea) (Chinese Taipei)	Choi Byung-hak; Liao Kun-fu	15; 5	15; 3
6	(South Korea) (Chinese Taipei)	Park Joo-bong; Huang Chien-tung	15; 10	18; 15
7	(South Korea) (Chinese Taipei)	Kim Byung-sik; Liu Han-chia	4; 15	12; 15
8	(South Korea) (Chinese Taipei)	Kim Joong-soo / Lee Jae-bok; Liu Han-chia / Tseng Hsueh-chih	13; 15	11; 15
9	(South Korea) (Chinese Taipei)	Lee Eun-ku / Park Joo-bong; Chi Shih-ching / Ho Chien-tung	15; 8	15; 2

=== Semi-finals ===
China
9
Beijing, China
30–31 January 1982

India
0

			1	2	3
1	(China) (India)	Chen Changjie; U. Vimal Kumar	15; 0	15; 1
2	(China) (India)	Han Jian; Syed Modi	15; 0	15; 3
3	(China) (India)	Lin Jiangli / Luan Jin; Uday Pawar / Sanjay Sharma	15; 9	15; 0
4	(China) (India)	Sun Zhian / Yao Ximing; Partho Ganguli / Vikram Singh	15; 8	15; 11
5	(China) (India)	Luan Jin; Uday Pawar	15; 4	15; 4
6	(China) (India)	Han Jian; U. Vimal Kumar	18; 1	15; 2
7	(China) (India)	Chen Changjie; Syed Modi	15; 2	15; 4
8	(China) (India)	Sun Zhian / Yao Ximing; Uday Pawar / Sanjay Sharma	15; 7	15; 11
9	(China) (India)	Lin Jiangli / Luan Jin; Partho Ganguli / Vikram Singh	15; 8	15; 6

Thailand
7
Bangkok, Thailand
30–31 January 1982

South Korea
2

			1	2	3
1	(Thailand) (South Korea)	Udom Luangpetcharaporn; Choi Byung-hak	15; 6	14; 17	15; 10
2	(Thailand) (South Korea)	Akkaraporn Sriratanakul; Park Joo-bong	15; 10	15; 4
3	(Thailand) (South Korea)	Pinit Boonoon / Surapong Suharitdamrong; Choi Byung-hak / Kim Joong-soo	15; 1	15; 7
4	(Thailand) (South Korea)	Sakchai Thanasriwanijai / Kriangsak Traiwekin; Lee Eun-ku / Park Joo-bong	7; 15	12; 15
5	(Thailand) (South Korea)	Udom Luangpetcharaporn; Park Joo-bong	15; 9	15; 6
6	(Thailand) (South Korea)	Akkaraporn Sriratanakul; Choi Byung-hak	15; 13	15; 9
7	(Thailand) (South Korea)	Sakchai Thanasriwanijai; Kim Joong-soo	15; 9	8; 15	9; 15
8	(Thailand) (South Korea)	Pinit Boonoon / Surapong Suharitdamrong; Lee Eun-ku / Park Joo-bong	10; 15	15; 12	15; 9
9	(Thailand) (South Korea)	Sakchai Thanasriwanijai / Kriangsak Traiwekin; Choi Byung-hak / Kim Joong-soo	17; 14	15; 10

=== Final ===
China
7
Bangkok, Thailand
4–5 March 1982

Thailand
2

			1	2	3
1	(China) (Thailand)	Han Jian; Udom Luangpetcharaporn	15; 9	15; 10
2	(China) (Thailand)	Chen Changjie; Akkaraporn Sriratanakul	15; 10	15; 5
3	(China) (Thailand)	Sun Zhian / Yao Ximing; Pinit Boonoon / Surapong Suharitdamrong	15; 11	15; 5
4	(China) (Thailand)	Luan Jin / Yang Kesen; Sakchai Thanasriwanijai / Kriangsak Traiwekin	18; 16	7; 15	12; 15
5	(China) (Thailand)	Luan Jin; Surapong Suharitdamrong	11; 15	15; 8	15; 13
6	(China) (Thailand)	Chen Changjie; Udom Luangpetcharaporn	15; 8	15; 12
7	(China) (Thailand)	Han Jian; Akkaraporn Sriratanakul	15; 10	15; 12
8	(China) (Thailand)	Luan Jin / Yang Kesen; Pinit Boonoon / Surapong Suharitdamrong	15; 17	12; 15
9	(China) (Thailand)	Sun Zhian / Yao Ximing; Sakchai Thanasriwanijai / Kriangsak Traiwekin	15; 10	15; 7

== American Zone ==
=== Bracket ===
First round
24 October 1981 – San Diego
Nigeria	0
United States	9
Mexico
Bye
26 October 1981 – Lima
Japan	9
Peru	0
Canada
Bye

Semi-finals
27 February 1982 – Pomona
United States	6
Canada	3
30 January 1982 – Kitchener
Japan	8
Canada	1

Final
3 April 1982 – Claremont
United States	1
Japan	8

=== First round ===
United States
9
San Diego, United States
24–25 October 1981

Nigeria
0

			1	2	3
1	(United States) (Nigeria)	Charles Coakley; Folusho Davies	15; 11	15; 12
2	(United States) (Nigeria)	Tony Alston; Samson Egbeyemi	15; 12	18; 13
3	(United States) (Nigeria)	Charles Coakley / Gary Higgins; Babatunde Badiru / Samson Egbeyemi	15; 9	15; 4
4	(United States) (Nigeria)	Gary Shelstad / Mike Walker; Folusho Davies / Fatai Tokosi	15; 5	15; 4
5	(United States) (Nigeria)	Charles Coakley; Samson Egbeyemi	15; 1	15; 9
6	(United States) (Nigeria)	Rodney Barton; Babatunde Badiru	15; 11	15; 10
7	(United States) (Nigeria)	Tony Alston; Folusho Davies	15; 12	15; 5
8	(United States) (Nigeria)	Gary Shelstad / Mike Walker; Babatunde Badiru / Samson Egbeyemi	15; 6	15; 7
9	(United States) (Nigeria)	Charles Coakley / Gary Higgins; Folusho Davies / Fatai Tokosi	15; 4	15; 3

Japan
9
Lima, Peru
26–27 October 1981

Peru
0

			1	2	3
1	(Japan) (Peru)	Kinji Zeniya; Alfredo Salazar	15; 1	15; 4
2	(Japan) (Peru)	Masao Tsuchida; Federico Valdez	15; 5	15; 2
3	(Japan) (Peru)	Shokichi Miyamori / Masao Tsuchida; Federico Valdez / Germán Valdez	15; 4	15; 5
4	(Japan) (Peru)	Toshihiro Tsuji / Kinji Zeniya; Alfredo Salazar / Gustavo Salazar	15; 8	15; 1
5	(Japan) (Peru)	Hiroyuki Hasegawa; Gustavo Salazar	15; 3	15; 3
6	(Japan) (Peru)	Masao Tsuchida; Alfredo Salazar	15; 2	15; 9
7	(Japan) (Peru)	Kinji Zeniya; Federico Valdez	15; 7	15; 8
8	(Japan) (Peru)	Toshihiro Tsuji / Kinji Zeniya; Federico Valdez / Germán Valdez	15; 5	15; 9
9	(Japan) (Peru)	Toshihiro Tsuji / Kinji Zeniya; Alfredo Salazar / Gustavo Salazar	15; 5	15; 5

=== Semi-finals ===
Japan
9
Kitchener, Canada
30–31 January 1982

Canada
0

			1	2	3
1	(Japan) (Canada)	Kinji Zeniya; Keith Priestman	15; 10	16; 18	15; 5
2	(Japan) (Canada)	Hiroyuki Hasegawa; John Goss	18; 17	8; 15	15; 5
3	(Japan) (Canada)	Shokichi Miyamori / Masao Tsuchida; Mark Freitag / Bob MacDougall	15; 8	10; 15	14; 17
4	(Japan) (Canada)	Hiroshi Nishiyama / Toshihiro Tsuji; Keith Priestman / Ken Priestman	15; 8	18; 16
5	(Japan) (Canada)	Hiroshi Nishiyama; Bob MacDougall	15; 7	15; 8
6	(Japan) (Canada)	Hiroyuki Hasegawa; Keith Priestman	9; 15	15; 10	15; 6
7	(Japan) (Canada)	Kinji Zeniya; John Goss	15; 3	15; 8
8	(Japan) (Canada)	Hiroshi Nishiyama / Toshihiro Tsuji; Mark Freitag / Bob MacDougall	15; 8	15; 2
9	(Japan) (Canada)	Shokichi Miyamori / Masao Tsuchida; Keith Priestman / Ken Priestman	15; 6	15; 11

United States
6
Pomona, California, United States
27–28 February 1982

Mexico
3

			1	2	3
1	(United States) (Mexico)	Tony Alston; Fernando de la Torre	15; 12	10; 15	4; 15
2	(United States) (Mexico)	Chris Kinard; Roy Díaz González	12; 15	1; 15
3	(United States) (Mexico)	John Britton / Gary Higgins; Victor Jaramillo / Jorge Palazuelos	17; 14	15; 7
4	(United States) (Mexico)	Gary Shelstad / Mike Walker; Roy Díaz González / Eugenio Tapia	15; 4	15; 11
5	(United States) (Mexico)	Gary Higgins; Eugenio Tapia	15; 9	15; 5
6	(United States) (Mexico)	Tony Alston; Roy Díaz González	11; 15	10; 15
7	(United States) (Mexico)	Chris Kinard; José Icaza	15; 9	15; 3
8	(United States) (Mexico)	Gary Shelstad / Mike Walker; Victor Jaramillo / Jorge Palazuelos	15; 9	17; 9
9	(United States) (Mexico)	John Britton / Gary Higgins; Roy Díaz González / Eugenio Tapia	15; 7	15; 9

=== Final ===
Japan
8
Claremont, California, United States
3–4 April 1982

United States
1

			1	2	3
1	(Japan) (United States)	Kinji Zeniya; Chris Kinard	15; 10	15; 9
2	(Japan) (United States)	Hiroyuki Hasegawa; Tony Alston	15; 8	15; 0
3	(Japan) (United States)	Shokichi Miyamori / Masao Tsuchida; Gary Shelstad / Mike Walker	15; 7	15; 5
4	(Japan) (United States)	Toshihiro Tsuji / Kinji Zeniya; John Britton / Gary Higgins	11; 15	14; 18
5	(Japan) (United States)	Hiroyuki Hasegawa; Chris Kinard	15; 9	15; 5
6	(Japan) (United States)	Masao Tsuchida; Gary Higgins	12; 15	15; 9	15; 5
7	(Japan) (United States)	Kinji Zeniya; Tony Alston	15; 7	15; 4
8	(Japan) (United States)	Shokichi Miyamori / Masao Tsuchida; John Britton / Gary Higgins	15; 10	15; 5
9	(Japan) (United States)	Hiroyuki Hasegawa / Kinji Zeniya; Gary Shelstad / Mike Walker	15; 11	4; 15	15; 6

== European Zone ==
=== Bracket ===
First round
Scotland
Bye
30 October 1981 – Pressbaum
Austria	0
Netherlands	9
Bye
Bye
Denmark
Bye
West Germany
Bye
Soviet Union
Bye
Bye
Bye
Bye
Sweden

Second round
1 December 1981 – Haarlem
Scotland	9
Netherlands	0
Bye
Denmark
7 December 1981 – Duisburg
West Germany	6
Soviet Union	3
Bye
Sweden

Semi-finals
25 January 1982 – Grangemouth
Scotland	0
Denmark	9
27 January 1982 – Duisburg
West Germany	1
Sweden	9

Final
17 February 1982 – Copenhagen
Denmark	8
Sweden	1

=== First round ===
Netherlands
9
Pressbaum, Austria
30–31 October 1981

Austria
0

			1	2	3
1	(Netherlands) (Austria)	Rob Ridder; Gerald Hofegger	15; 2	15; 2
2	(Netherlands) (Austria)	Uun Santosa; Alfred Hofer	15; 12	15; 6
3	(Netherlands) (Austria)	Herman Leidelmeijer / Rob Ridder; Gerald Hofegger / Johann Ratheyser	15; 5	15; 6
4	(Netherlands) (Austria)	Uun Santosa / Guus van der Vlugt; Herwig Baltz / Ernst Stingl	15; 7	15; 8
5	(Netherlands) (Austria)	Uun Santosa; Gerald Hofegger	15; 0	15; 5
6	(Netherlands) (Austria)	Rob Ridder; Alfred Hofer	15; 3	15; 3
7	(Netherlands) (Austria)	Lex Coene; Klaus Fischer	15; 2	15; 2
8	(Netherlands) (Austria)	Uun Santosa / Guus van der Vlugt; Gerald Hofegger / Johann Ratheyser	8; 15	18; 13	15; 11
9	(Netherlands) (Austria)	Herman Leidelmeijer / Rob Ridder; Herwig Baltz / Ernst Stingl	15; 6	15; 9

=== Second round ===
Scotland
9
Haarlem, Netherlands
1–2 December 1981

Netherlands
0

			1	2	3
1	(Scotland) (Netherlands)	Charlie Gallagher; Rob Ridder	15; 11	15; 8
2	(Scotland) (Netherlands)	Gordon Hamilton; Uun Santosa	9; 15	15; 14	15; 12
3	(Scotland) (Netherlands)	Billy Gilliland / Dan Travers; Herman Leidelmeijer / Rob Ridder	15; 2	15; 10
4	(Scotland) (Netherlands)	David Shaylor / Alex White; Ivan Kristanto / Frank van Dongen	15; 9	15; 9
5	(Scotland) (Netherlands)	Gordon Hamilton; Rob Ridder	15; 11	15; 7
6	(Scotland) (Netherlands)	Charlie Gallagher; Uun Santosa	15; 12	15; 4
7	(Scotland) (Netherlands)	Dan Travers; Lex Coene	18; 16	15; 8
8	(Scotland) (Netherlands)	David Shaylor / Alex White; Herman Leidelmeijer / Rob Ridder	15; 7	15; 9
9	(Scotland) (Netherlands)	Billy Gilliland / Dan Travers; Ivan Kristanto / Frank van Dongen	15; 1	15; 4

West Germany
6
Duisburg, Germany
8–9 December 1981

Soviet Union
3

			1	2	3
1	(West Germany) (Soviet Union)	Michael Schnaase; Anatoli Skripko	3; 15	7; 15
2	(West Germany) (Soviet Union)	Georg Simon; Vitaliy Shmakov	7; 15	11; 15
3	(West Germany) (Soviet Union)	Harald Klauer / Gerhard Treitinger; Nikolay Peshekhonov / Vitaliy Shmakov	2; 15	15; 10	15; 11
4	(West Germany) (Soviet Union)	Stefan Frey / Thomas Künstler; Viktor Samarin / Konstantin Vavilov	15; 7	15; 9
5	(West Germany) (Soviet Union)	Georg Simon; Anatoli Skripko	12; 15	11; 15
6	(West Germany) (Soviet Union)	Michael Schnaase; Vitaliy Shmakov	15; 9	7; 15	15; 7
7	(West Germany) (Soviet Union)	Thomas Künstler; Nikolay Peshekhonov	15; 11	15; 6
8	(West Germany) (Soviet Union)	Harald Klauer / Gerhard Treitinger; Viktor Samarin / Konstantin Vavilov	15; 12	15; 8
9	(West Germany) (Soviet Union)	Thomas Künstler / Stefan Frey; Nikolay Peshekhonov / Vitaliy Shmakov	15; 4	15; 2

=== Semi-finals ===
Denmark
9
Grangemouth, Scotland
25–26 January 1982

Scotland
0

			1	2	3
1	(Denmark) (Scotland)	Morten Frost; Charlie Gallagher	15; 3	15; 5
2	(Denmark) (Scotland)	Flemming Delfs; Gordon Hamilton	15; 7	10; 15	15; 2
3	(Denmark) (Scotland)	Steen Fladberg / Morten Frost; Billy Gilliland / Dan Travers	15; 3	15; 5
4	(Denmark) (Scotland)	Jesper Helledie / Jens Peter Nierhoff; David Shaylor / Alex White	14; 17	15; 9	15; 12
5	(Denmark) (Scotland)	Morten Frost; Gordon Hamilton	15; 1	15; 4
6	(Denmark) (Scotland)	Flemming Delfs; Charlie Gallagher	15; 5	15; 4
7	(Denmark) (Scotland)	Claus Andersen; Dan Travers	15; 12	15; 8
8	(Denmark) (Scotland)	Steen Fladberg / Morten Frost; David Shaylor / Alex White	15; 9	15; 11
9	(Denmark) (Scotland)	Jesper Helledie / Jens Peter Nierhoff; Billy Gilliland / Dan Travers	15; 7	15; 7

Sweden
9
Duisburg, Germany
27–28 January 1982

West Germany
0

			1	2	3
1	(Sweden) (West Germany)	Thomas Kihlström; Michael Schnaase	15; 2	15; 6
2	(Sweden) (West Germany)	Stefan Karlsson; Ulrich Rost	15; 11	15; 6
3	(Sweden) (West Germany)	Claes Nordin / Lars Wengberg; Stefan Frey / Thomas Künstler	15; 8	15; 4
4	(Sweden) (West Germany)	Stefan Karlsson / Thomas Kihlström; Harald Klauer / Gerhard Treitinger	13; 18	15; 3	15; 8
5	(Sweden) (West Germany)	Stefan Karlsson; Michael Schnaase	15; 8	15; 5
6	(Sweden) (West Germany)	Christian Lundberg; Thomas Künstler	15; 8	15; 4
7	(Sweden) (West Germany)	Thomas Kihlström; Ulrich Rost	15; 9	12; 15	15; 7
8	(Sweden) (West Germany)	Claes Nordin / Lars Wengberg; Harald Klauer / Gerhard Treitinger	4; 15	17; 14	15; 6
9	(Sweden) (West Germany)	Stefan Karlsson / Christian Lundberg; Stefan Frey / Thomas Künstler	15; 6	15; 11

=== Final ===
Denmark
8
Copenhagen, Denmark
17–18 February 1982

Sweden
1

			1	2	3
1	(Denmark) (Sweden)	Morten Frost; Thomas Kihlström	15; 4	15; 8
2	(Denmark) (Sweden)	Jens Peter Nierhoff; Stefan Karlsson	15; 8	15; 3
3	(Denmark) (Sweden)	Steen Fladberg / Morten Frost; Thomas Kihlström / Lars Wengberg	11; 15	7; 15
4	(Denmark) (Sweden)	Jesper Helledie / Jens Peter Nierhoff; Claes Nordin / Stefan Karlsson	15; 11	15; 5
5	(Denmark) (Sweden)	Morten Frost; Stefan Karlsson	15; 4	15; 1
6	(Denmark) (Sweden)	Flemming Delfs; Sture Johnsson	15; 5	15; 6
7	(Denmark) (Sweden)	Jens Peter Nierhoff; Thomas Kihlström	3; 0			retired
8	(Denmark) (Sweden)	Steen Fladberg / Morten Frost; Claes Nordin / Stefan Karlsson	18; 17	15; 6
9	(Denmark) (Sweden)	Jesper Helledie / Jens Peter Nierhoff; Christian Lundberg / Lars Wengberg	15; 4	15; 10

== Australasian Zone ==
=== Bracket ===
Semi-finals
4 August 1981 – Hamilton
Malaysia	9
Australia	0
New Zealand
Bye

Final
7 August 1981 – Hamilton
Malaysia	7
New Zealand	2

=== Semi-finals ===
Malaysia
9
Hamilton, New Zealand
4–5 August 1981

Australia
0

			1	2	3
1	(Malaysia) (Australia)	Misbun Sidek; Mark Harry	15; 9	15; 8
2	(Malaysia) (Australia)	Phua Ah Hua; Darren McDonald	15; 10	15; 3
3	(Malaysia) (Australia)	Jalani Sidek / Razif Sidek; Mark Harry / Paul Kong	15; 3	15; 2
4	(Malaysia) (Australia)	Misbun Sidek / Ong Beng Teong; Darren McDonald / Michael Scandolera	15; 6	15; 9
5	(Malaysia) (Australia)	Phua Ah Hua; Mark Harry	15; 13	4; 15	15; 10
6	(Malaysia) (Australia)	Misbun Sidek; Darren McDonald	15; 13	15; 4
7	(Malaysia) (Australia)	James Selvaraj; Trevor James	18; 5	15; 6
8	(Malaysia) (Australia)	Jalani Sidek / Razif Sidek; Darren McDonald / Michael Scandolera	15; 9	15; 3
9	(Malaysia) (Australia)	Misbun Sidek / Ong Beng Teong; Mark Harry / Paul Kong	15; 8	10; 15	15; 10

=== Final ===
Malaysia
7
Hamilton, New Zealand
7–8 August 1981

New Zealand
2

			1	2	3
1	(Malaysia) (New Zealand)	Saw Swee Leong; Graeme Robson	17; 14	15; 2
2	(Malaysia) (New Zealand)	Misbun Sidek; Bryan Purser	15; 9	15; 9
3	(Malaysia) (New Zealand)	Jalani Sidek / Razif Sidek; Phil Horne / Steve Wilson	15; 7	15; 6
4	(Malaysia) (New Zealand)	Misbun Sidek / Ong Beng Teong; Chris Bullen / Bryan Purser	15; 4	6; 15	15; 8
5	(Malaysia) (New Zealand)	Misbun Sidek; Graeme Robson	2; 15	6; 15
6	(Malaysia) (New Zealand)	Phua Ah Hua; Steve Wilson	17; 18	13; 15
7	(Malaysia) (New Zealand)	Saw Swee Leong; Bryan Purser	15; 11	15; 11
8	(Malaysia) (New Zealand)	Misbun Sidek / Ong Beng Teong; Phil Horne / Steve Wilson	15; 3	15; 9
9	(Malaysia) (New Zealand)	Misbun Sidek / Ong Beng Teong; Chris Bullen / Bryan Purser	15; 9	15; 5
