= Badminton at the 1982 Asian Games – Men's team =

Men's team at the 1982 Asian Games
- Venue: Indraprashtha Indoor Stadium
- Dates: 25–28 November
- Nations: 11

Medalists
gold medal	China; Chen Changjie, Han Jian, Lin Jiangli, Luan Jin, Sun Zhian, Yao Ximing
silver medal	Indonesia; Christian Hadinata, Hadiyanto Wirawan, Rudy Heryanto, Kartono, Liem Swie King, Icuk Sugiarto
bronze medal	India; Leroy D'Sa, Pradeep Gandhe, Partho Ganguli, Syed Modi, Uday Pawar, Vikram Singh
bronze medal	South Korea; Choi Byung-hak, Kim Byung-sik, Lee Deuk-choon, Lee Eun-ku, Park Joo-bong, Sung Han-kook

The badminton men's team tournament at the 1982 Asian Games in New Delhi took place from 25 November to 28 November.

Eleven countries took part in the tournament. In the semi-finals, Indonesia and China both defeated India and South Korea 5–0 respectively. In the final, China defeated Indonesia 3–2 to win the gold medal.

== Schedule ==
All times are Indian Standard Time (UTC+05:30)

Date	Event
25 November	Round of 16
26 November	Quarter-finals
27 November	Semi-finals
28 November	Final

== Results ==
Legend

- WO — Won by walkover

Round of 16
Thailand	4
Nepal	1
Hong Kong	1
Malaysia	4
Pakistan	0
South Korea	5

Quarter-finals
Indonesia	5
Japan	0
India	4
Thailand	1
Malaysia	1
South Korea	4
Maldives	0
China	5

Semi-finals
Indonesia	5
India	0
South Korea	0
China	5

Gold medal match
Indonesia	2
China	3

=== Round of 16 ===
25 November	Thailand	4–1	Nepal

Sawei Chanseorasmee	2–0	Pradeep B. Shah	15–1, 15–1
Sarit Pisudchaikul	2–0	Prakash Rana	15–1, 15–2
Udom Luangpetcharaporn / Surapong Suharitdamrong	2–0	Pratap Adhikari / Naresh Bahadur Singh	15–8, 15–2
Surapong Suharitdamrong	1–2	Pratap Adhikari	15–9, 7–15, 6–15
Sawei Chanseorasmee / Sarit Pisudchaikul	2–0	Prakash Rana / Pradeep B. Shah	Walkover

25 November	Malaysia	4–1	Hong Kong

Foo Kok Keong	2–0	Poon Fai Hung	15–10, 15–5
Razif Sidek	2–0	Wong Yung	15–13, 15–4
Ong Beng Teong / Soh Goon Chup	2–0	Chan Chi Choi / Sze Yu	15–4, 15–4
Jalani Sidek / Razif Sidek	2–0	Chan Chi Choi / Fung Ming Chi	15–0, 15–1
Ong Beng Teong	0–2	Sze Yu	11–15, 9–15

25 November	South Korea	5–0	Pakistan

Park Joo-bong	2–0	Tariq Wadood	18–13, 15–10
Choi Byung-hak	2–1	Zubair Ahmed	18–14, 15–18, 18–14
Lee Eun-ku / Park Joo-bong	2–0	Zubair Ahmed / Mirza Ali Yar Beg	15–4, 15–5
Kim Byung-sik / Lee Deuk-choon	2–1	Zahid Maqbool / Tariq Wadood	15–10, 1–15, 15–8
Sung Han-kook	2–0	Nadeem Ur Rahman	15–5, 15–5

=== Quarter-finals ===
25 November	Indonesia	5–0	Japan

25 November	India	4–1	Thailand

Syed Modi	2–0	Sawei Chanseorasmee	15–5, 15–5
Uday Pawar	0–2	Sarit Pisudchaikul	9–15, 2–15
Partho Ganguli / Vikram Singh	2–1	Bandid Jaiyen / Preecha Sopajaree	15–18, 15–10, 15–12
Leroy D'Sa / Pradeep Gandhe	2–0	Sawei Chanseorasmee / Sarit Pisudchaikul	15–6, 15–7
Pradeep Gandhe	2–0	Udom Luangpetcharaporn	15–12, 15–12

25 November	Malaysia	1–4	South Korea

Foo Kok Keong	0–2	Park Joo-bong	7–15, 7–15
Razif Sidek	0–2	Choi Byung-hak	12–15, 13–18
Jalani Sidek / Razif Sidek	0–2	Lee Eun-ku / Park Joo-bong	4–15, 8–15
Ong Beng Teong / Soh Goon Chup	0–2	Kim Byung-sik / Lee Deuk-choon	17–18, 18–14, 12–15
Ong Beng Teong	2–0	Sung Han-kook	Walkover

25 November	China	5–0	Maldives

Han Jian	2–0	Ahmed Saleem	15–1, 15–1
Chen Changjie	2–0	M. Abbas	15–1, 15–1
Sun Zhian / Yao Ximing	2–0	Ismail Shareef / Mohamed Vajeeh	15–3, 15–2
Lin Jiangli / Luan Jin	2–0	Hussain Rasheed / Ahmed Saleem	15–1, 15–2
Luan Jin	2–0	Mohamed Vajeeh	15–1, 15–2

=== Semi-finals ===
27 November	Indonesia	5–0	India

Liem Swie King	2–1	Syed Modi	15–12, 12–15, 18–13
Icuk Sugiarto	2–0	Uday Pawar	15–10, 15–5
Rudy Heryanto / Kartono	2–0	Partho Ganguli / Vikram Singh	15–9, 15–11
Christian Hadinata / Icuk Sugiarto	2–0	Leroy D'Sa / Pradeep Gandhe	15–17, 15–1, 15–10
Christian Hadinata	2–0	Pradeep Gandhe	15–6, 15–6

27 November	China	5–0	South Korea

Han Jian	2–0	Park Joo-bong	15–5, 15–6
Luan Jin	2–0	Sung Han-kook	15–6, 15–11
Sun Zhian / Yao Ximing	2–0	Lee Eun-ku / Park Joo-bong	17–14, 15–4
Lin Jiangli / Luan Jin	2–0	Kim Byung-sik / Lee Deuk-choon	15–7, 15–8
Chen Changjie	2–0	Choi Byung-hak	15–4, 15–9

=== Final ===
28 November	Indonesia	2–3	China

Liem Swie King	0–2	Han Jian	9–15, 2–15
Icuk Sugiarto	2–0	Luan Jin	15–9, 15–8
Rudy Heryanto / Kartono	0–2	Sun Zhian / Yao Ximing	12–15, 8–15
Christian Hadinata / Liem Swie King	2–0	Lin Jiangli / Luan Jin	15–8, 15–12
Hadiyanto Wirawan	0–2	Chen Changjie	10–15, 9–15
