= 1979 Thomas Cup squads =

This article lists the squads for the 1979 Thomas Cup participating teams. The age listed for each player is on 24 May 1979 which was the first day of the tournament.

== Teams ==
=== Canada ===
Six players represented Canada in the 1979 Thomas Cup.

Name	DoB/Age
John Czich	1952 (aged 26–27)
Pat Tryon	1956 (aged 22–23)
Ian Johnson	1957 (aged 21–22)
Paul Johnson	1959 (aged 19–20)
Bob MacDougall	1960 (aged 18–19)
David deBelle	1960 (aged 18–19)

=== Denmark ===
Five players represented Denmark in the 1979 Thomas Cup.

Name	DoB/Age
Svend Pri	18 March 1945 (aged 34)
Flemming Delfs	7 September 1951 (aged 27)
Morten Frost	4 April 1958 (aged 21)
Steen Skovgaard	1950 (aged 28–29)
Steen Fladberg	11 October 1956 (aged 22)

=== India ===
Five players represented India in the 1979 Thomas Cup.

Name	DoB/Age
Prakash Padukone	10 June 1955 (aged 23)
Syed Modi	31 December 1962 (aged 16)
Uday Pawar	1956 (aged 22–23)
Partho Ganguli	March 1953 (aged 26)
Pradeep Gandhe	1955 (aged 20–21)

=== Indonesia ===
Nine players represented Indonesia in the 1979 Thomas Cup.

Name	DoB/Age
Rudy Hartono	18 August 1949 (aged 29)
Liem Swie King	28 February 1956 (aged 23)
Iie Sumirat	15 November 1950 (aged 28)
Tjun Tjun	4 October 1952 (aged 26)
Johan Wahjudi	10 February 1953 (aged 26)
Ade Chandra	4 February 1950 (aged 29)
Christian Hadinata	11 December 1949 (aged 29)
Hadiyanto	31 March 1955 (aged 24)
Lius Pongoh	3 December 1960 (aged 18)

=== Japan ===
Eight players represented Japan in the 1979 Thomas Cup.

Name	DoB/Age
Kinji Zeniya	13 March 1953 (aged 26)
Masao Tsuchida	9 September 1953 (aged 25)
Yoshitaka Iino	1953 (aged 25–26)
Hiroyuki Hasegawa	19 January 1957 (aged 22)
Nobutaka Ikeda	1957 (aged 21–22)
Shoichi Toganoo	1947 (aged 31–32)
Toshihiro Tsuji	1946 (aged 32–33)
Mikio Ozaki	1949 (aged 29–30)
