= 1983 IBF World Championships – Men's doubles =

Men's doubles at the 1983 IBF World Championships
- Venue: Brøndbyhallen
- Location: Copenhagen, Denmark
- Dates: May 2, 1983 – May 8, 1983

Medalists
gold medal	Steen Fladberg; Jesper Helledie	Denmark
silver medal	Mike Tredgett; Martin Dew	England
bronze medal	Park Joo-bong; Lee Eun-ku	South Korea
bronze medal	Christian Hadinata; Bobby Ertanto	Indonesia

The 1983 IBF World Championships (World Badminton Championships) were held in Copenhagen, Denmark. Men's doubles results are listed.

== Main stage ==
=== Section 1 ===
First round
(Denmark) Steen Fladberg (Denmark) Jesper Helledie
(England) Steve Baddeley (England) Dipak Tailor
(Jamaica) Trevor Stewart (Wales) Lim Yim Chong
(Norway) Tomm Eriksen (Norway) Oyvind Berntsen
(South Korea) Kim Moon-soo (South Korea) Kim Byung-sik	15	15
(Peru) German Valdez (Finland) Heikki Holvikari	5	4
(Malaysia) Razif Sidek (Malaysia) Jalani Sidek
(Sweden) Thorbjörn Petersson (Sweden) Lars Wengberg	10	15	15
(Germany) Thomas Künstler (Germany) Stefan Frey	15	8	5
(India) Uday Pawar (India) Pradeep Gandhe	15	15
(Netherlands) Lex Coene (Netherlands) Guus van der Vlugt	6	5

Second round
(Denmark) Steen Fladberg (Denmark) Jesper Helledie	15	17	15
(England) Steve Baddeley (England) Dipak Tailor	10	18	2
(Jamaica) Trevor Stewart (Wales) Lim Yim Chong	15	5	15
(Norway) Tomm Eriksen (Norway) Oyvind Berntsen	11	15	5
(South Korea) Kim Moon-soo (South Korea) Kim Byung-sik	6	1
(Malaysia) Razif Sidek (Malaysia) Jalani Sidek	15	2	(Aufg.)
(Sweden) Thorbjörn Petersson (Sweden) Lars Wengberg	15	15
(India) Uday Pawar (India) Pradeep Gandhe	6	10

Third round
(Denmark) Steen Fladberg (Denmark) Jesper Helledie	15	15
(Jamaica) Trevor Stewart (Wales) Lim Yim Ching	5	2
(South Korea) Kim Moon-soo (South Korea) Kim Byung-sik	2	15	15
15	(Sweden) Thorbjörn Petersson (Sweden) Lars Wengberg	8	7

Quarterfinals
(Denmark) Steen Fladberg (Denmark) Jesper Helledie	15	15
(South Korea) Kim Moon-soo (South Korea) Kim Byung-sik	10	3

=== Section 2 ===
First round
(Indonesia) Christian Hadinata (Indonesia) Bobby Ertanto
(Canada) Mike Butler (Canada) Paul Johnson
(Japan) Masao Tsuchida (Japan) Shokichi Miyamori	15	15
(Nigeria) Samson Egbeyemi (Nigeria) Babatunde Badiru	1	3
(Austria) Klaus Fischer (Austria) Heinz Fischer
(China) Sun Zhian (China) Yao Ximing
(Socialist Federal Republic of Yugoslavia) Gregor Berden (Poland) Jerzy Dołhan
(New Zealand) Graeme Robson (Australia) Sze Yu

Second round
(Indonesia) Christian Hadinata (Indonesia) Bobby Ertanto	15	15
(Canada) Mike Butler (Canada) Paul Johnson	8	5
(Japan) Masao Tsuchida (Japan) Shokichi Miyamori	15	15
(Austria) Klaus Fischer (Austria) Heinz Fischer	4	8
(China) Sun Zhian (China) Yao Ximing	15	15
(Socialist Federal Republic of Yugoslavia) Gregor Berden (Poland) Jerzy Dołhan	7	3
(New Zealand) Graeme Robson (Australia) Sze Yu

Third round
(Indonesia) Christian Hadinata (Indonesia) Bobby Ertanto	15	15
(Japan) Masao Tsuchida (Japan) Shokichi Miyamori	7	13
(China) Sun Zhian (China) Yao Ximing	15	15
(New Zealand) Graeme Robson (Australia) Sze Yu	7	3

Quarterfinals
(Indonesia) Christian Hadinata (Indonesia) Bobby Ertanto	15	18
(China) Sun Zhian (China) Yao Ximing	8	14

=== Section 3 ===
First round
(England) Martin Dew (England) Mike Tredgett
(Peru) Federico Valdez (Peru) Armando del Carpio
(Wales) Philip Sutton (Wales) Chris Rees
(Nigeria) Clement Ogbo (Nigeria) Folusho Davies
(China) Jiang Guoliang (China) He Shangquan
(Iceland) Broddi Kristjánsson (Iceland) Gudmundur Adolfsson	3	5
(Canada) Bob MacDougall (Canada) Mark Freitag	15	15
(Pakistan) Tariq Wadood (Pakistan) Aamir Shameen	9	9
(Indonesia) Rudy Heryanto (Indonesia) Hadibowo	15	15
(Switzerland) Pascal Kaul (Switzerland) Werner Riesen	4	5
(Denmark) Steen Skovgaard (Denmark) Jens Peter Nierhoff

Second round
(England) Martin Dew (England) Mike Tredgett	15	15
(Peru) Federico Valdez (Peru) Armando del Carpio	1	3
(Wales) Philip Sutton (Wales) Chris Rees	15	15
(Nigeria) Clement Ogbo (Nigeria) Folusho Davies	4	8
(China) Jiang Guoliang (China) He Shangquan	15	15
(Canada) Bob MacDougall (Canada) Mark Freitag	10	5
(Indonesia) Rudy Heryanto (Indonesia) Hadibowo	17	17
(Denmark) Steen Skovgaard (Denmark) Jens Peter Nierhoff	15	15

Third round
(England) Martin Dew (England) Mike Tredgett	15	15
(Wales) Philip Sutton (Wales) Chris Rees	3	10
(China) Jiang Guoliang (China) He Shangquan	15	15
(Indonesia) Rudy Heryanto (Indonesia) Hadibowo	10	9

Quarterfinals
(England) Martin Dew (England) Mike Tredgett	18	15
(China) Jiang Guoliang (China) He Shangquan	14	11

=== Section 4 ===
First round
(South Korea) Park Joo-bong (South Korea) Lee Eun-ku
(Japan) Hiroyuki Hasegawa (Japan) Yukihiro Miyamoto
(Scotland) Billy Gilliland (Scotland) Dan Travers	w.o.
(Mozambique) Sozinho Guerra (Mozambique) Luis Philippe Leboeuf
(Netherlands) Rob Ridder (Netherlands) Uun Santosa	15	15
(Australia) Paul Kong (Australia) Darren McDonald	5	10
(Sweden) Stefan Karlsson (Sweden) Thomas Kihlström
(Norway) Peter Thoresen (Norway) Geir Dahl
(Malaysia) Ong Beng Teong (Malaysia) Soh Goon Chup
(Germany) Harald Klauer (Germany) Uwe Scherpen

Second round
(South Korea) Park Joo-bong (South Korea) Lee Eun-ku	15	15
(Japan) Hiroyuki Hasegawa (Japan) Yukihiro Miyamoto	3	7
(Scotland) Billy Gilliland (Scotland) Dan Travers	15	15
(Netherlands) Rob Ridder (Netherlands) Uun Santosa	12	7
(Sweden) Stefan Karlsson (Sweden) Thomas Kihlström	w.o.
(Norway) Peter Thoresen (Norway) Geir Dahl
(Malaysia) Ong Beng Teong (Malaysia) Soh Goon Chup	15	17
(Germany) Harald Klauer (Germany) Uwe Scherpen	11	15

Third round
(South Korea) Park Joo-bong (South Korea) Lee Eun-ku	15	15
(Scotland) Billy Gilliland (Scotland) Dan Travers	7	9
(Sweden) Stefan Karlsson (Sweden) Thomas Kihlström	15	13	17
(Malaysia) Ong Beng Teong (Malaysia) Soh Goon Chup	9	15	14

Quarterfinals
(South Korea) Park Joo-bong (South Korea) Lee Eun-ku	15	15
(Sweden) Stefan Karlsson (Sweden) Thomas Kihlström	13	8

== Final stage ==
Quarterfinals
(Denmark) Steen Fladberg (Denmark) Jesper Helledie	15	15
(South Korea) Kim Moon-soo (South Korea) Kim Byung-sik	10	3
(Indonesia) Christian Hadinata (Indonesia) Bobby Ertanto	15	18
(China) Sun Zhian (China) Yao Ximing	8	14
(England) Martin Dew (England) Mike Tredgett	18	15
(China) Jiang Guoliang (China) He Shangquan	14	11
(South Korea) Park Joo-bong (South Korea) Lee Eun-ku	15	15
(Sweden) Stefan Karlsson (Sweden) Thomas Kihlström	13	8

Semifinals
(Denmark) Steen Fladberg (Denmark) Jesper Helledie	18	15
(Indonesia) Christian Hadinata (Indonesia) Bobby Ertanto	16	11
(England) Martin Dew (England) Mike Tredgett	15	2	15
(South Korea) Park Joo-bong (South Korea) Lee Eun-ku	8	15	4

Finals
(Denmark) Steen Fladberg (Denmark) Jesper Helledie	15	15
(England) Martin Dew (England) Mike Tredgett	10	10
