= Badminton at the 1986 Asian Games – Men's team =

Men's team at the 1986 Asian Games
- Venue: Olympic Gymnastics Arena
- Dates: 27–29 September
- Competitors: 51 from 8 nations

Medalists
gold medal	South Korea; Choi Byung-hak, Kim Chang-kook, Kim Joong-soo, Kim Moon-soo, Lee Deuk-choon, Park Joo-bong, Park Sung-bae, Sung Han-kook
silver medal	China; Chen Kang, Ding Qiqing, Jiang Guoliang, Li Yongbo, Tian Bingyi, Xiong Guobao, Yang Yang, Zhao Jianhua
bronze medal	India; Leroy D'Sa, U. Vimal Kumar, Ravi Kunte, Sanat Misra, Syed Modi, Prakash Padukone, Uday Pawar
bronze medal	Indonesia; Bobby Ertanto, Christian Hadinata, Eddy Hartono, Eddy Kurniawan, Liem Swie King, Lius Pongoh, Icuk Sugiarto, Hadibowo Susanto

The badminton men's team tournament at the 1986 Asian Games in Seoul took place from 27 September to 29 September.

== Schedule ==
All times are Korea Standard Time (UTC+09:00)

Date	Time	Event
27 September	11:00	Quarter-finals
28 September	21:00	Semi-finals
29 September	14:00	Final

== Results ==
Quarterfinals
1	China	5
Hong Kong	0
Japan	2
India	3
Nepal	0
South Korea	5
Malaysia	2
2	Indonesia	3

Semifinals
1	China	4
India	1
South Korea	3
2	Indonesia	2

Final
1	China	0
South Korea	5

=== Quarterfinals ===
27 September	China	5–0	Hong Kong

Yang Yang	2–0	Yeung Yik Kei	15–1, 15–3
Zhao Jianhua	2–0	Tsang To	15–1, 15–4
Tian Bingyi / Li Yongbo	2–0	Yeung Yik Kei / Lai Hung	15–10, 15–4
Chen Kang / Ding Qiqing	2–0	Tsang To / Lee To Shing	15–2, 15–5
Xiong Guobao	2–0	Lee To Shing	15–5, 15–2

27 September	Japan	2–3	India

Hiroki Eto	0–2	Prakash Padukone	7–15, 4–15
Hiroshi Nishiyama	0–2	U. Vimal Kumar	12–15, 2–15
Shinji Matsuura / Hiroshi Nishiyama	1–2	Prakash Padukone / Uday Pawar	14–17, 15–11, 13–18
Shokichi Miyamori / Tetsuaki Inoue	2–1	Leroy D'Sa / Sanat Misra	15–17, 15–7, 15–13
Shinji Matsuura	2–0	Syed Modi	18–17, 15–12

27 September	Nepal	0–5	South Korea

Pratap Adhikari	0–2	Sung Han-kook	3–15, 2–15
Ramji Bahadur Shrestha	0–2	Park Sung-bae	0–15, 5–15
Prakash Dhoj Rana / Pratap Adhikari	0–2	Park Joo-bong / Kim Moon-soo	2–15, 2–15
Ramji Bahadur Shrestha / Krishna Chakradhar	0–2	Kim Joong-soo / Lee Deuk-choon	1–15, 2–15
Prakash Dhoj Rana	0–2	Choi Byung-hak	3–15, 8–15

27 September	Malaysia	2–3	Indonesia

Misbun Sidek	1–2	Icuk Sugiarto	6–15, 15–11, 10–15
Foo Kok Keong	0–2	Eddy Kurniawan	10–15, 8–15
Chong Weng Kai / Misbun Sidek	0–2	Liem Swie King / Bobby Ertanto	2–15, 4–15
Razif Sidek / Cheah Soon Kit	2–1	Christian Hadinata / Hadibowo Susanto	15–7, 14–17, 15–2
Rashid Sidek	2–0	Lius Pongoh	Walkover

=== Semifinals ===
28 September	China	4–1	India

Zhao Jianhua	0–2	Prakash Padukone	3–15, 4–15
Yang Yang	2–0	U. Vimal Kumar	15–6, 15–4
Tian Bingyi / Li Yongbo	2–0	Prakash Padukone / Uday Pawar	15–6, 15–8
Ding Qiqing / Chen Kang	2–0	Leroy D'Sa / Sanat Misra	15–4, 15–4
Xiong Guobao	2–0	Ravi Kunte	15–1, 15–3

28 September	South Korea	3–2	Indonesia

Park Joo-bong	2–1	Icuk Sugiarto	8–15, 15–11, 15–9
Sung Han-kook	2–1	Eddy Kurniawan	15–5, 12–15, 15–4
Park Joo-bong / Kim Moon-soo	2–0	Christian Hadinata / Hadibowo Susanto	15–8, 15–5
Kim Joong-soo / Lee Deuk-choon	0–2	Liem Swie King / Bobby Ertanto	3–15, 13–15
Park Sung-bae	1–2	Lius Pongoh	15–7, 11–15, 9–15

=== Final ===
29 September	China	0–5	South Korea

Zhao Jianhua	0–2	Park Joo-bong	7–15, 5–15
Yang Yang	0–2	Sung Han-kook	16–18, 4–15
Ding Qiqing / Chen Kang	0–2	Park Joo-bong / Kim Moon-soo	4–15, 5–15
Tian Bingyi / Li Yongbo	0–2	Kim Joong-soo / Lee Deuk-choon	Walkover
Xiong Guobao	0–2	Park Sung-bae	Walkover

== Non-participating athletes ==
- Jiang Guoliang (CHN)
- Eddy Hartono (INA)
- Kim Chang-kook (KOR)
- Kwan Yoke Meng (MAL)
