= 1983 IBF World Championships – Mixed doubles =

Mixed doubles at the 1983 IBF World Championships
- Venue: Brøndbyhallen
- Location: Copenhagen, Denmark
- Dates: May 2, 1983 – May 8, 1983

Medalists
| gold medal | (Sweden) Thomas Kihlström (England) Nora Perry |
| silver medal | Steen Fladberg; Pia Nielsen | Denmark |
| bronze medal | Mike Tredgett; Karen Chapman | England |
| bronze medal | Jiang Guoliang; Lin Ying | China |

The 1983 IBF World Championships (World Badminton Championships) were held in Copenhagen, Denmark, in 1983. Following the results of the mixed doubles.

== Main stage ==
=== Section 1 ===
First round
(Sweden) Thomas Kihlström (England) Nora Perry
(Australia) Paul Kong (Australia) Audrey Swaby
(India) Pradeep Gandhe (India) Ami Ghia
(Canada) Paul Johnson (Canada) Claire Backhouse | 15 | 17
(Denmark) Jesper Helledie (Denmark) Dorte Kjær
(China) Tian Bingyi (China) Han Aiping
(Japan) Koji Gondo (Japan) Shigemi Kawamura | 15 | 15
(Peru) Armando del Carpio (Peru) Ximena Bellido | 5 | 10
(Netherlands) Rob Ridder (Netherlands) Marjan Ridder
(Indonesia) Hariamanto Kartono (Indonesia) Ruth Damayanti | 15 | 15
(Japan) Kinji Zeniya (Japan) Fumiko Tookairin | 9 | 5

Second round
(Sweden) Thomas Kihlström (England) Nora Perry | 15 | 15
(Australia) Paul Kong (Australia) Audrey Swaby | 9 | 3
(India) Pradeep Gandhe (India) Ami Ghia
(Canada) Paul Johnson (Canada) Claire Backhouse
(China) Tian Bingyi (China) Han Aiping
(Japan) Koji Gondo (Japan) Shigemi Kawamura
(Netherlands) Rob Ridder (Netherlands) Marjan Ridder | 15 | 15
(Indonesia) Hariamanto Kartono (Indonesia) Ruth Damayanti | 7 | 10

Third round
(Sweden) Thomas Kihlström (England) Nora Perry
(India) Pradeep Gandhe (India) Ami Ghia
(China) Tian Bingyi (China) Han Aiping | 15 | 13 | 15
(Netherlands) Rob Ridder (Netherlands) Marjan Ridder | 2 | 15 | 4

Quarterfinals
(Sweden) Thomas Kihlström (England) Nora Perry | 15 | 7 | 15
(China) Tian Bingyi (China) Han Aiping | 12 | 15 | 11

=== Section 2 ===
First round
(England) Mike Tredgett (England) Karen Chapman | 15 | 15
(Japan) Shokichi Miyamori (Japan) Kimiko Jinnai | 5 | 2
(Australia) Darren McDonald (Australia) Julie McDonald | 15 | 15
(Switzerland) Werner Riesen (Switzerland) Sylvia Lüthi | 2 | 0
(Canada) Mike Butler (Canada) Linda Cloutier | 15 | 15
(South Korea) Kim Byung Sik (South Korea) Yoo Sang Hee | 6 | 10
(Poland) Jerzy Dołhan (Poland) Bożena Wojtkowska
(Denmark) Steen Skovgaard (Denmark) Anne Skovgaard
(Scotland) Billy Gilliland (Scotland) Christine Heatly
(Peru) Federico Valdez (Peru) Carmen Bellido

Second round
(England) Mike Tredgett (England) Karen Chapman
(Australia) Darren McDonald (Australia) Julie McDonald
(Canada) Mike Butler (Canada) Linda Cloutier | 15 | 15
(Poland) Jerzy Dołhan (Poland) Bożena Wojtkowska | 4 | 3
(Denmark) Steen Skovgaard (Denmark) Anne Skovgaard | 8 | 15 | 15
(Scotland) Billy Gilliland (Scotland) Christine Heatly | 15 | 4 | 9
(Peru) Federico Valdez (Peru) Carmen Bellido

Third round
(England) Mike Tredgett (England) Karen Chapman | 15 | 15
(Canada) Mike Butler (Canada) Linda Cloutier | 3 | 9
(Denmark) Steen Skovgaard (Denmark) Anne Skovgaard | 15 | 15
(Peru) Federico Valdez (Peru) Carmen Bellido | 0 | 2

Quarterfinals
(England) Mike Tredgett (England) Karen Chapman | 15 | 4 | 17
(Denmark) Steen Skovgaard (Denmark) Anne Skovgaard | 11 | 15 | 16

=== Section 3 ===
First round
(Denmark) Steen Fladberg (Denmark) Pia Nielsen
(Indonesia) Bobby Ertanto (Indonesia) Maria Fransisca
(Canada) Bon MacDougall (Canada) Denyse Julien
(Sweden) Göran Carlsson (Sweden) Christine Magnusson | 15 | 15
(Germany) Rolf Rüsseler (Germany) Eva-Maria Zwiebler | 5 | 2
(England) Dipak Tailor (England) Gillian Clark | 15 | 15
(Peru) German Valdez (Iceland) Kristin Kristjansdottir | 3 | 3
(New Zealand) Graeme Robson (New Zealand) Toni Whittaker | 18 | 18
(Scotland) Dan Travers (Scotland) Pamela Hamilton | 15 | 17
(Netherlands) Guus van der Vlugt (Netherlands) Joke van Beusekom | 15 | 15
(South Korea) Kim Byung Sik (South Korea) Yoo Sang Hee | 6 | 16

Second round
(Denmark) Steen Fladberg (Denmark) Pia Nielsen | 15 | 15
(Indonesia) Bobby Ertanto (Indonesia) Maria Fransisca | 5 | 6
(Canada) Bon MacDougall (Canada) Denyse Julien
(Sweden) Göran Carlsson (Sweden) Christine Magnusson
(England) Dipak Tailor (England) Gillian Clark
(New Zealand) Graeme Robson (New Zealand) Toni Whittaker | 15 | 15
(Netherlands) Guus van der Vlugt (Netherlands) Joke van Beusekom | 5 | 10

Third round
(Denmark) Steen Fladberg (Denmark) Pia Nielsen | 15 | 15
(Canada) Bon MacDougall (Canada) Denyse Julien | 7 | 2
(England) Dipak Tailor (England) Gillian Clark | 17 | 18
(New Zealand) Graeme Robson (New Zealand) Toni Whittaker | 15 | 16

Quarterfinals
(Denmark) Steen Fladberg (Denmark) Pia Nielsen | 15 | 15
(England) Dipak Tailor (England) Gillian Clark | 6 | 10

=== Section 4 ===
First round
(China) Jiang Guoliang (China) Lin Ying
(England) Steve Baddeley (England) Karen Bridge
(Denmark) Kenneth Larsen (Denmark) Gitte Paulsen | 15 | 15
(Wales) Lim Yim Chong (Wales) Linda Blake | 3 | 5
(Netherlands) Uun Santosa (Netherlands) Karin van der Valk
(England) Martin Dew (England) Gillian Gilks
(Canada) Mark Freitag (Canada) Johanne Falardeau

Second round
(China) Jiang Guoliang (China) Lin Ying | 15 | 11 | 15
(England) Steve Baddeley (England) Karen Bridge | 10 | 15 | 10
(Denmark) Kenneth Larsen (Denmark) Gitte Paulsen | 15 | 17 | 15
(Netherlands) Uun Santosa (Netherlands) Karin van der Valk | 1 | 18 | 6
(England) Martin Dew (England) Gillian Gilks
(Canada) Mark Freitag (Canada) Johanne Falardeau

Third round
(China) Jiang Guoliang (China) Lin Ying | 15 | 15
(Denmark) Kenneth Larsen (Denmark) Gitte Paulsen | 11 | 9
(England) Martin Dew (England) Gillian Gilks | 15 | 15
(Canada) Mark Freitag (Canada) Johanne Falardeau | 4 | 7

Quarterfinals
(China) Jiang Guoliang (China) Lin Ying | 15 | 8 | 15
(England) Martin Dew (England) Gillian Gilks | 7 | 15 | 7

== Final stage ==
Quarterfinals
(Sweden) Thomas Kihlström (England) Nora Perry | 15 | 7 | 15
(China) Tian Bingyi (China) Han Aiping | 12 | 15 | 11
(England) Mike Tredgett (England) Karen Chapman | 15 | 4 | 17
(Denmark) Steen Skovgaard (Denmark) Anne Skovgaard | 11 | 15 | 16
(Denmark) Steen Fladberg (Denmark) Pia Nielsen | 15 | 15
(England) Dipak Tailor (England) Gillian Clark | 6 | 10
(China) Jiang Guoliang (China) Lin Ying | 15 | 8 | 15
(England) Martin Dew (England) Gillian Gilks | 7 | 15 | 7

Semifinals
(Sweden) Thomas Kihlström (England) Nora Perry | 15 | 9 | 15
(England) Mike Tredgett (England) Karen Chapman | 10 | 15 | 6
(Denmark) Steen Fladberg (Denmark) Pia Nielsen | 15 | 15
(China) Jiang Guoliang (China) Lin Ying | 5 | 6

Finals
(Sweden) Thomas Kihlström (England) Nora Perry | 15 | 15
(Denmark) Steen Fladberg (Denmark) Pia Nielsen | 1 | 11
