= 2017 BWF World Senior Championships – 60+ =

Tournament details
- Dates: 11 September 2017 – 17 September 2017
- Edition: 9
- Level: International
- Nations: 18
- Venue: Rajiv Gandhi Indoor Stadium
- Location: Kochi, India

Champions
- Men's singles: (Scotland) Dan Travers
- Women's singles: (England) Christine M. Corssley
- Men's doubles: (Russia) Sergey Bushuev (Russia) Vladimir Koloskov
- Women's doubles: (Japan) Sugako Morita (Japan) Sayoko Takebayashi
- Mixed doubles: (England) Ian M. Purton (England) Christine M. Crossley

These are the results of 2017 BWF World Senior Championships' 60+ events.

== Men's singles ==
=== Seeds ===
1. (Scotland) Dan Travers (champion, gold medal)
2. (Sri Lanka) Arnold Dendeng (final, silver medal)
3. (Japan) Toshio Kawaguchi (third round)
4. (Russia) Vladimir Koloskov (quarterfinals)
5. (Malaysia) Chan Wan Seong (semifinals, bronze medal)
6. (Austria) Tariq Farooq (quarterfinals)
7. (Russia) Sergey Bushuev (quarterfinals)
8. (Malaysia) Ong Then Lin (semifinals, bronze medal)

=== Finals ===
Semifinals
1	(Scotland) Dan Travers	21	22	21
5	(Malaysia) Chan Wan Seong	11	24	10
8	(Malaysia) Ong Then Lin	14	13
2	(Sri Lanka) Arnold Dendeng	21	21

Final
1	(Scotland) Dan Travers	13	21	26
2	(Sri Lanka) Arnold Dendeng	21	16	24

=== Top half ===
==== Section 1 ====
First Round
(Malaysia) Lee T Y	21	21
(Thailand) V Kimsunthorn	16	13

Second Round
1	(Scotland) D Travers	21	21
(Sweden) C Liljestrom	14	12
(France) P Premat	21	20	18
(Denmark) J C. Nielsen	15	22	21
7	(Russia) S Bushuev	21	21
(India) A K A Latheef	11	12
(England) L P Loo	21	19	21
(Malaysia) Lee T Y	15	21	17

Third Round
1	(Scotland) D Travers	21	21
(Denmark) J C. Nielsen	13	7
7	(Russia) S Bushuev	21	21
(England) L P Loo	14	7

Quarterfinals
1	(Scotland) D Travers	21	21
7	(Russia) S Bushuev	15	12

==== Section 2 ====
First Round
(India) P B Chirakkaparambil	19	22	22
(Denmark) J Wohlert	21	20	20
(Sweden) J Widoff	21	21
(Russia) I Ponomarev	8	18

Second Round
3	(Japan) T Kawaguchi	21	21
(England) J Clapp	13	10
(France) M Chanteur	11	7
(India) P B Chirakkaparambil	21	21
5	(Malaysia) Chan W S	w	/	o
(Sri Lanka) J R U de Silva
(Switzerland) P Dodd	6	14
(Sweden) J Widoff	21	21

Third Round
3	(Japan) T Kawaguchi	19	21
(India) P B Chirakkaparambil	23	21
5	(Malaysia) Chan W S	18	21	21
(Sweden) J Widoff	21	18	17

Quarterfinals
(India) P B Chirakkaparambil	10	21	14
5	(Malaysia) Chan W S	21	16	21

=== Bottom half ===
==== Section 3 ====
First Round
(Uzbekistan) O Kuzaev	8	14
(Sweden) C Forsgren	21	21
(Denmark) O K Mortensen	18	21	14
(Thailand) C Suvanich	21	16	21

Second Round
(Sweden) C Forsgren	w	/	o
(India) K Leishangthem
(Hong Kong) Zee J J	11	17
8	(Malaysia) Ong T L	21	21
(Thailand) C Suvanich	21	19	21
(England) P Jeffreys	18	21	17
(France) K Sethuraman	13	7
4	(Russia) V Koloskov	21	21

Third Round
(Sweden) C Forsgren	25	15
8	(Malaysia) Ong T L	27	21
(Thailand) C Suvanich	11	19
4	(Russia) V Koloskov	21	21

Quarterfinals
8	(Malaysia) Ong T L	21	12	21
4	(Russia) V Koloskov	15	21	19

==== Section 4 ====
First Round
(Sweden) B Wigardt	21	21
(France) J Y Breard	10	13
(Russia) Y Smirnov	21	21
(Nepal) R Bhattachan	3	9

Second Round
(Sweden) B Wigardt	19	15
(Denmark) K Meier	21	21
(India) G Ashra	11	8
6	(Austria) T Farooq	21	21
(Russia) Y Smirnov	21	21
(Japan) T Aoyama	18	11
(England) R Traviss	9	7
2	(Sri Lanka) A Dendeng	21	21

Third Round
(Denmark) K Meier	17	9
6	(Austria) T Farooq	21	21
(Russia) Y Smirnov	15	18
2	(Sri Lanka) A Dendeng	21	21

Quarterfinals
6	(Austria) T Farooq	20	8
2	(Sri Lanka) A Dendeng	21	21

== Women's singles ==
=== Seeds ===
1. (England) Christine M. Crossley (champion, gold medal)
2. (Scotland) Christine Black (final, silver medal)
3. (Japan) Sugako Morita (semifinals, bronze medal)
4. (Japan) Sayolo Takebayashi (semifinals, bronze medal)

=== Finals ===
Semifinals
1	(England) Christine M. Crossley	21	21
4	(Japan) Sayoko Takebayashi	9	13
3	(Japan) Sugako Morita	22	16	17
2	(Scotland) Christine Black	20	21	21

Final
1	(England) Christine M. Crossley	21	21
2	(Scotland) Christine Black	11	7

=== Top half ===
==== Section 1 ====
First Round
(Canada) M Jackson	21	21
(Russia) N Patrikeeva	14	11

Second Round
1	(England) C M. Crossley	21	21
(India) S Chitre	5	3
(Japan) F Araki	11	9
(Canada) M Jackson	21	21

Quarterfinals
1	(England) C M. Crossley	21	21
(Canada) M Jackson	16	9

==== Section 2 ====
First Round
(France) H Hay	21	21
(Russia) F Dayanova	19	14
(Germany) A Niesner	20	21	21
(England) A Harris	22	13	13

Second Round
4	(Japan) S Takebayashi	21	21
(France) H Hay	14	15
(India) M Dsa	9	13
(Germany) A Niesner	21	21

Quarterfinals
4	(Japan) S Takebayashi	21	21
(Germany) A Niesner	8	10

=== Bottom half ===
==== Section 3 ====
First Round
(France) S Leverdez	21	8	26
(India) S V John	19	21	24
(Hong Kong) Ng K C	21	17	10
(England) A C. Bridge	18	21	21

Second Round
(France) S Leverdez	21	21
(Russia) V Bikmullina	8	11
(England) A C. Bridge	11	13
3	(Japan) S Morita	21	21

Quarterfinals
(France) S Leverdez	7	17
3	(Japan) S Morita	21	21

==== Section 4 ====
First Round
(Russia) V Kolosova	14	14
(Austria) I Matt	21	21
(India) V Deogirikar	3	8
(Japan) M Sato	21	21

Second Round
(Austria) I Matt	19	21	23
(England) J Flower	21	17	21
(Japan) M Sato	14	21	16
2	(Scotland) C Black	21	13	21

Quarterfinals
(Austria) I Matt	11	12
2	(Scotland) C Black	21	21

== Men's doubles ==
=== Seeds ===
1. (Thailand) Jiamsak Panitchaikul / (England) Richard Traviss (quarterfinals)
2. (Austria) Tariq Farooq / (Denmark) Karsten Meier (final, silver medal)
3. (Malaysia) Chan Wan Seong / Yap Foo Keong (second round)
4. (England) John Kindred / Ian M. Purton (semifinals, bronze medal)

=== Finals ===
Semifinals
(Japan) Tadao Aoyama (Japan) Toshio Kawaguchi	14	21
(Russia) Sergey Bushuev (Russia) Vladimir Koloskov	21	23
4	(England) John Kindred (England) Ian M. Purton	15	17
2	(Austria) Tariq Farooq (Denmark) Karsten Meier	21	21

Final
(Russia) Sergey Bushuev (Russia) Vladimir Koloskov	21	19	21
2	(Austria) Tariq Farooq (Denmark) Karsten Meier	15	21	17

=== Top half ===
==== Section 1 ====
First Round
(France) P Premat (Germany) J Reiche	24	16	10
(India) A K A Latheef (India) C Mendez	22	21	21
(Russia) I Ponomarev (Sweden) J Widoff	9	9
(Japan) T Aoyama (Japan) T Kawaguchi	21	21

Second Round
1	(Thailand) J Panitchaikul (England) R Traviss	21	21
(India) A K A Latheef (India) C Mendez	15	19
(England) P Jeffreys (England) L P Loo	15	7
(Japan) T Aoyama (Japan) T Kawaguchi	21	21

Quarterfinals
1	(Thailand) J Panitchaikul (England) R Traviss	21	19	9
(Japan) T Aoyama (Japan) T Kawaguchi	13	21	21

==== Section 2 ====
First Round
(India) B S Chingshubam (India) K Leishangthem	21	21
(England) J Clapp (England) R Wells	14	14
(Russia) S Bushuev (Russia) V Koloskov	21	21
(Denmark) O K Mortensen (Denmark) J Wohlert	13	13

Second Round
3	(Malaysia) Chan W S (Malaysia) Yap F K	21	16	21
(India) B S Chingshubam (India) K Leishangthem	10	21	23
(Sweden) C Forsgren (Sweden) C Lijestrom	19	17
(Russia) S Bushuev (Russia) V Koloskov	21	21

Quarterfinals
(India) B S Chingshubam (India) K Leishangthem	9	13
(Russia) S Bushuev (Russia) V Koloskov	21	21

=== Bottom half ===
==== Section 3 ====
First Round
(India) S Anekal (India) B N Sakaleshpura Krishnaiah	21	21
(Nepal) R Bhattachan (Canada) W Metcalfe	11	18
(Uzbekistan) O Kuzaev (Hong Kong) Zee J J	21	21
(Sri Lanka) J R U de Silva (Sri Lanka) F Mainaky	15	11

Second Round
(India) S Anekal (India) B N Sakaleshpura Krishnaiah	17	18
(Malaysia) Lee T Y (Malaysia) Ong T L	21	21
(Uzbekistan) O Kuzaev (Hong Kong) Zee J J	22	16	13
4	(England) J Kindred (England) I M. Purton	20	21	21

Quarterfinals
(Malaysia) Lee T Y (Malaysia) Ong T L	20	19
4	(England) J Kindred (England) I M. Purton	22	21

==== Section 4 ====
First Round
(India) S Abraham (India) P Ganguli	18	19
(Sweden) L Strömberg (Sweden) B Wigardt	21	21

Second Round
(Sweden) L Strömberg (Sweden) B Wigardt	21	21
(France) J Y Breard (France) K Sethuraman	18	16
(Brunei) Obey A G (Brunei) Yong J	12	3
2	(Austria) T Farooq (Denmark) K Meier	21	21

Quarterfinals
(Sweden) L Strömberg (Sweden) B Wigardt	11	16
2	(Austria) T Farooq (Denmark) K Meier	21	21

== Women's doubles ==
=== Seeds ===
1. (Scotland) Christine Black / (England) Christine M. Crossley (final, silver medal)
2. (Japan) Sugako Morita / Sayoko Takebayashi (champions, gold medal)

=== Group A ===
Rank	Player	Pts	Pld	W	L	SF	SA	PF	PA
1	(Scotland) Christine Black (England) Christine M. Crossley	1	1	1	0	2	0	42	14
2	(England) Reggie Baker (England) Anne C. Bridge	0	1	0	1	0	2	14	42
	(India) Jessie Philip (India) Susy V. John	Retired							

Date		Score		Set 1	Set 2	Set 3
11 Sep; 15:00	Christine Black (Scotland); Christine M. Crossley (England)	2–0	(England) Reggie Baker (England) Anne C. Bridge	21–6	21–8	
12 Sep; 16:30	Jessie Philip (India); Susy V. John (India)	Retired	(England) Reggie Baker (England) Anne C. Bridge	8–21	10^{r}–15	
13 Sep; 17:20	Christine Black (Scotland); Christine M. Crossley (England)	w/o	(India) Jessie Philip (India) Susy V. John			

=== Group B ===
Rank	Player	Pts	Pld	W	L	SF	SA	PF	PA
1	(Canada) Siew Har Hong (Canada) Marcia Jackson	3	3	3	0	6	0	126	70
2	(Austria) Irene Matt (Hong Kong) Ng Kit Ching	2	3	2	1	4	3	121	116
3	(England) Janice Flower (England) Janet B. Williams	1	3	1	2	3	4	136	119
4	(India) Madhu Ahuja (India) Vandana Deogirikar	0	3	0	3	0	6	48	126

Date		Score		Set 1	Set 2	Set 3
11 Sep; 15:00	Madhu Ahuja (India); Vandana Deogirikar (India)	0–2	(Canada) Siew Har Hong (Canada) Marcia Jackson	13–21	2–21	
11 Sep; 15:30	Janice Flower (England); Janet B. Williams (England)	1–2	(Austria) Irene Matt (Hong Kong) Ng Kit Ching	19–21	21–15	20–22
12 Sep; 16:30	Madhu Ahuja (India); Vandana Deogirikar (India)	0–2	(Austria) Irene Matt (Hong Kong) Ng Kit Ching	7–21	7–21	
12 Sep; 16:30	Janice Flower (England); Janet B. Williams (England)	0–2	(Canada) Siew Har Hong (Canada) Marcia Jackson	17–21	17–21	
13 Sep; 17:20	Madhu Ahuja (India); Vandana Deogirikar (India)	0–2	(England) Janice Flower (England) Janet B. Williams	8–21	11–21	
13 Sep; 17:20	Irene Matt (Austria); Ng Kit Ching (Hong Kong)	0–2	(Canada) Siew Har Hong (Canada) Marcia Jackson	9–21	12–21	

=== Group C ===
Rank	Player	Pts	Pld	W	L	SF	SA	PF	PA
1	(Russia) Flera Dayanova (Russia) Nataliia Patrikeeva	3	3	3	0	6	1	142	105
2	(France) Helene Hay (France) Sylvia Leverdez	2	3	2	1	5	2	133	98
3	(Russia) Venera Bikmullina (Germany) Angelika Niesner	1	3	1	2	2	5	115	134
4	(India) Sucheta Chitra (India) Neera Pasricha	0	3	0	3	1	6	95	148

Date		Score		Set 1	Set 2	Set 3
11 Sep; 15:00	Sucheta Chitre (India); Neera Pasricha (India)	0–2	(France) Helene Hay (France) Sylvia Leverdez	9–21	9–21	
11 Sep; 16:00	Flera Dayanova (Russia); Nataliia Patrikeeva (Russia)	2–0	(Russia) Venera Bikmullina (Germany) Angelika Niesner	21–13	21–16	
12 Sep; 17:00	Sucheta Chitre (India); Neera Pasricha (India)	1–2	(Russia) Venera Bikmullina (Germany) Angelika Niesner	12–21	24–22	14–21
12 Sep; 17:00	Flera Dayanova (Russia); Nataliia Patrikeeva (Russia)	2–1	(France) Helene Hay (France) Sylvia Leverdez	16–21	21–11	21–17
13 Sep; 17:20	Sucheta Chitre (India); Neera Pasricha (India)	0–2	(Russia) Flera Dayanova (Russia) Nataliia Patrikeeva	16–21	11–21	
13 Sep; 17:55	Venera Bikmullina (Russia); Angelika Niesner (Germany)	0–2	(France) Helene Hay (France) Sylvia Leverdez	10–21	12–21	

=== Group D ===
Rank	Player	Pts	Pld	W	L	SF	SA	PF	PA
1	(Japan) Sugako Morita (Japan) Sayoko Takebayashi	2	2	2	0	4	0	84	38
2	(England) Anna Bowskill (England) Sylvia Penn	1	2	1	1	2	2	64	66
3	(India) Kanyakumari Salekoppa Lax Bhatta (India) Saroja B. R. Shetty	0	2	0	2	0	4	40	84

Date		Score		Set 1	Set 2	Set 3
11 Sep; 16:00	Sugako Morita (Japan); Sayoko Takebayashi (Japan)	2–0	(England) Anna Bowskill (England) Sylvia Penn	21–7	21–15	
12 Sep; 17:00	Kenyakumari Salekoppa Lax Bhatta (India); Saroja B. R. Shetty (India)	0–2	(England) Anna Bowskill (England) Sylvia Penn	15–21	9–21	
13 Sep; 17:55	Sugako Morita (Japan); Sayoko Takebayashi (Japan)	2–0	(India) Kanyakumari Salekoppa Lax Bhatta (India) Saroja B. R. Shetty	21–10	21–6	

=== Finals ===
Quarterfinals
A1	(Scotland) Christine Black (England) Christine M. Crossley	21	21
B2	(Austria) Irene Matt (Hong Kong) Ng Kit Ching	7	7
C1	(Russia) Flera Dayanova (Russia) Nataliia Patrikeeva	15	22	19
D2	(England) Anna Bowskill (England) Sylvia Penn	21	20	21
C2	(France) Helene Hay (France) Sylvia Leverdez	21	13	13
B1	(Canada) Siew Har Hong (Canada) Marcia Jackson	16	21	21
A2	(England) Reggie Baker (England) Anne C. Bridge	11	10
D1	(Japan) Sugako Morita (Japan) Sayoko Takebayashi	21	21

Semifinals
A1	(Scotland) Christine Black (England) Christine M. Crossley	21	21
D2	(England) Anna Bowskill (England) Sylvia Penn	14	12
B1	(Canada) Siew Har Hong (Canada) Marcia Jackson	18	13
D1	(Japan) Sugako Morita (Japan) Sayoko Takebayashi	21	21

Final
A1	(Scotland) Christine Black (England) Christine M. Crossley	24	18	14
D1	(Japan) Sugako Morita (Japan) Sayoko Takebayashi	22	21	21

== Mixed doubles ==
=== Seeds ===
1. (Scotland) Dan Travers / Christine Black (final, silver medal)
2. (England) Ian M. Purton / Christine M. Crossley (champions, gold medal)
3. (Canada) William Metcalfe / Marcia Jackson (quarterfinals)
4. (England) Roger Taylor / Anne C. Bridge (quarterfinals)

=== Finals ===
Semifinals
1	(Scotland) Dan Travers (Scotland) Christine Black	21	21
(Japan) Roshio Kawaguchi (Japan) Sayoko Takebayashi	16	16
(England) Robin Wells (England) Janet B. Williams	15	6
2	(England) Ian M. Purton (England) Christine M. Crossley	21	21

Final
1	(Scotland) Dan Travers (Scotland) Christine Black	15	3^{r}
2	(England) Ian M. Purton (England) Christine M. Crossley	21	5

=== Top half ===
==== Section 1 ====
First Round
(Denmark) J C. Nielsen (Sweden) L Wengberg	21	21
(India) L F D'Sa (India) M Dsa	17	6

Second Round
1	(Scotland) D Traver (Scotland) C Black	21	21
(Russia) S Bushuev (Russia) N Patrikeeva	8	7
(Denmark) K Meier (England) R Baker	21	21
(Denmark) J C. Nielsen (Sweden) L Wengberg	19	6

Quarterfinals
1	(Scotland) D Traver (Scotland) C Black	21	21
(Denmark) K Meier (England) R Baker	10	10

==== Section 2 ====
First Round
(Japan) R Kawaguchi (Japan) S Takebayashi	21	21
(Austria) T Farooq (Austria) I Matt	13	11

Second Round
4	(England) R Taylor (England) A C. Bridge	w	/	o
(India) P B Chirakkaparambil (India) J Philip
(Sweden) C Lijestrom (Sweden) V Kolosova	6	11
(Japan) R Kawaguchi (Japan) S Takebayashi	21	21

Quarterfinals
4	(England) R Taylor (England) A C. Bridge	10	15
(Japan) R Kawaguchi (Japan) S Takebayashi	21	21

=== Bottom half ===
==== Section 3 ====
First Round
(India) S K Patet (India) P Nagalia	21	21
(Germany) J Reiche (Germany) A Niesner	16	19
(Russia) I Ponomarev (Russia) F Dayanova	21	21
(Denmark) O K Mortensen (Russia) V Bikmullina	7	18

Second Round
(India) S K Patet (India) P Nagalia	18	11
(England) R Wells (England) J B. Williams	21	21
(Russia) I Ponomarev (Russia) F Dayanova	18	14
3	(Canada) W Metcalfe (Canada) M Jackson	21	'21

Quarterfinals
(England) R Wells (England) J B. Williams	21	13	21
3	(Canada) W Metcalfe (Canada) M Jackson	16	21	15

==== Section 4 ====
First Round
(Japan) T Aoyama (Japan) H Asakoshi	21	16	10
(India) G Ashra (India) P Desai	18	21	21

Second Round
(India) G Ashra (India) P Desai	12	17
(Hong Kong) Zee J J (Hong Kong) Ng K C	21	21
(France) P Premat (France) M Bontemps	7	5
2	(England) I M. Purton (England) C M. Crossley	21	21

Quarterfinals
(Hong Kong) Zee J J (Hong Kong) Ng K C	19	7
2	(England) I M. Purton (England) C M. Crossley	21	21

== Sources ==
- Men's singles
  - Results
- Women's singles
  - Results
- Men's doubles
  - Results
- Women's doubles
  - Group A Results
  - Group B Results
  - Group C Results
  - Group D Results
  - Finals Results
- Mixed doubles
  - Results
