= Syed Modi Railway Stadium =

Cricket stadium in Gorakhpur, Uttar Pradesh, India

- Railway Stadium
- Interactive map of Syed Modi Railway Stadium

Ground information
- Location: Gorakhpur, Uttar Pradesh
- Country: India
- Coordinates: 26.7514°N 83.3969°E
- Establishment: 1967
- Capacity: n/a

Team information
Railways cricket team	(1967-present)
- As of 22 August 2015; Source: Ground profile

Syed Modi Railway Stadium is a cricket stadium in Gorakhpur, Uttar Pradesh, India. The ground has hosted two Ranji matches when home team Railways cricket team played against Vidarbha cricket team in 1982. Again the stadium was used in 1983 when home team Railways cricket team played against Rajasthan cricket team. The stadium was established and governed by Indian Railways and was named as Railway Stadium. But later it was named after former Indian badminton player Syed Modi.
