= 1983 Asian Badminton Championships =

Badminton championships

Tournament details
- Dates: 1 – 8 December
- Edition: 6
- Venue: Netaji Indoor Stadium
- Location: Calcutta, West Bengal, India

The Asian Badminton Championships 1983 took place from 1 to 8 December in Calcutta, India. Both individual competitions and men's team competitions were conducted. Ultimately, China took titles from four disciplines, Men's singles, Men's doubles, Women's doubles and Men's team competitions while South Korea won Women's singles and Mixed doubles events.

== Medalists ==
Discipline	Gold	Silver	Bronze
Men's singles	(China) Chen Changjie	(Indonesia) Eddy Kurniawan	(South Korea) Park Joo-bong
Men's singles	(China) Chen Changjie	(Indonesia) Eddy Kurniawan	(China) Zhao Jianhua
Women's singles	(South Korea) Yoo Sang-hee	(South Korea) Kim Yun-ja	(China) Fan Ming
Women's singles	(South Korea) Yoo Sang-hee	(South Korea) Kim Yun-ja	(China) Guan Weizhen
Men's doubles	(China) He Shangquan (China) Jiang Guoliang	(South Korea) Sung Han-kuk (South Korea) Yoo Byung-hwan	(Indonesia) Hadibowo (Indonesia) Hafid Yusuf
Men's doubles	(China) He Shangquan (China) Jiang Guoliang	(South Korea) Sung Han-kuk (South Korea) Yoo Byung-hwan	(China) Sun Zhian (China) Zhao Jianhua
Women's doubles	(China) Fan Ming (China) Guan Weizhen	(South Korea) Kim Bok-sun (South Korea) Park Hyun-suk	(South Korea) Chung Myung-hee (South Korea) Yoo Sang-hee
Women's doubles	(China) Fan Ming (China) Guan Weizhen	(South Korea) Kim Bok-sun (South Korea) Park Hyun-suk	(China) Lu Qing (China) Song Youping
Mixed doubles	(South Korea) Park Joo-bong (South Korea) Kim Yun-ja	(Indonesia) Hafid Yusuf (Indonesia) Ruth Damayanti	(Indonesia) Hadibowo (Indonesia) Maria Francisca
Mixed doubles	(South Korea) Park Joo-bong (South Korea) Kim Yun-ja	(Indonesia) Hafid Yusuf (Indonesia) Ruth Damayanti	(Thailand) Preecha Sopajaree (Thailand) Jutatip Banjongsilp
Men's team	China; Chen Changjie; Zhao Jianhua; Jiang Guoliang; He Shangquan	India; Prakash Padukone; Leroy D'Sa; Uday Pawar; Syed Modi; Partho Ganguli	Indonesia; Eddy Kurniawan; Hadibowo; Chafidz Yusuf; Kurniahu

== Medal table ==
Rank	Nation	Gold	Silver	Bronze	Total
1	China (CHN)	4	0	5	9
2	South Korea	2	3	2	7
3	Indonesia (INA)	0	2	3	5
4	India (IND)	0	1	0	1
5	Thailand (THA)	0	0	1	1
Totals (5 entries)		6	6	11	23

== Final results ==
Discipline	Winner	Finalist	Score
Men's singles	(China) Chen Changjie	(Indonesia) Eddy Kurniawan	11–15, 15–6, 18–15
Women's singles	(South Korea) Yoo Sang-hee	(South Korea) Kim Yun-ja	11–6, 11–2
Men's doubles	(China) He Shangquan (China) Jiang Guoliang	(South Korea) Sung Han-kook (South Korea) Yoo Byung-hwan	18–15, 15–4
Women's doubles	(China) Fan Ming (China) Guan Weizhen	(South Korea) Kim Bok-sun (South Korea) Park Hyun-suk	15–11, 15–3
Mixed doubles	(South Korea) Park Joo-bong (South Korea) Kim Yun-ja	(Indonesia) Hafid Yusuf (Indonesia) Ruth Damayanti	15–3, 15–2

== Semifinal results ==
Discipline	Winner	Runner-up	Score
Men's singles	(China) Chen Changjie	(South Korea) Park Joo-bong	15–9, 15–7
Men's singles	(Indonesia) Eddy Kurniawan	(China) Zhao Jianhua	18–15, 6–15, 18–15
Women's singles	(South Korea) Yoo Sang-hee	(China) Fan Ming	11–7, 9–12, 11–4
Women's singles	(South Korea) Kim Yun-ja	(China) Guan Weizhen	7–11, 11–4, 11–1
Men's doubles	(China) He Shangquan (China) Jiang Guoliang	(Indonesia) Hadibowo (Indonesia) Hafid Yusuf	15–9, 6–15, 15–1
Men's doubles	(South Korea) Sung Han-kook (South Korea) Yoo Byung-hwan	(China) Sun Zhian (China) Zhao Jianhua	15–10, 15–6
Women's doubles	(China) Fan Ming (China) Guan Weizhen	(South Korea) Chung Myung-hee (South Korea) Yoo Sang-hee	10–15, 15–6, 17–14
Women's doubles	(South Korea) Kim Bok-sun (South Korea) Park Hyun-suk	(China) Lu Qing (China) Song Youping	18–13, 15–10
Mixed doubles	(South Korea) Park Joo-bong (South Korea) Kim Yun-ja	(Indonesia) Hadibowo (Indonesia) Maria Francisca	15–4, 15–5
Mixed doubles	(Indonesia) Hafid Yusuf (Indonesia) Ruth Damayanti	(Thailand) Preecha Sopajaree (Thailand) Jutatip Banjongsilp	15–10, 17–14
