= David Shaylor =

Scottish international badminton player

Personal information
- Nationality: British (Scottish)
- Born: born c.1962

Sport
- Sport: Badminton
- Club: Glasgow

David Shaylor (born c.1962) is a former international badminton player from Scotland who competed at the Commonwealth Games.

== Biography ==
Shaylor was based in Glasgow and represented Scotland at international level. He was named the most improved player in 1980 and made his international debut in November 1981 in the Thomas Cup.

Shaylor represented the Scottish team at the 1982 Commonwealth Games in Brisbane, Australia, where he competed in the badminton events. Four years later, he was named as the reserve for the 1986 Commonwealth Games in Edinburgh.

He earned 19 caps for Scotland between 1981 and 1988.
