= Lee Jae-bok =

South Korean pole vaulter

Personal information
- Nationality: South Korean
- Born: 27 June 1961 (age 65)

Sport
- Sport: Athletics
- Event: Pole vault

Lee Jae-bok (Korean: 이재복; born June 27, 1961) is a South Korean athlete. He competed in the men's pole vault at the 1988 Summer Olympics.
