= Sung Han-kook =

South Korean badminton player (born 1963)

Sung Han-kook 성한국
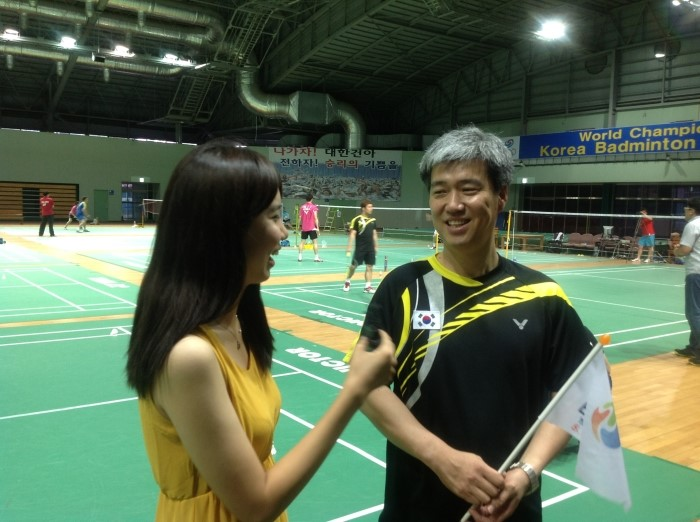

Personal information
- Born: 19 November 1963 (age 62) South Korea

Sport
- Country: South Korea
- Sport: Badminton
- Event: Men's singles
Medal record
Men's badminton
Representing South Korea
Sudirman Cup
Silver medal – second place	1989 Jakarta	Mixed team
Asian Games
Gold medal – first place	1986 Seoul	Men's team
Bronze medal – third place	1986 Seoul	Men's singles
Bronze medal – third place	1982 New Delhi	Men's team
Bronze medal – third place	1990 Beijing	Men's team
Asian Championships
Silver medal – second place	1983 Calcutta	Men's doubles
Bronze medal – third place	1987 Semarang	Men's team
Bronze medal – third place	1989 Shanghai	Men's team

- Sung Han-kook
- Hangul: 성한국
- Hanja: 成漢國
- RR: Seong Hanguk
- MR: Sŏng Han'guk

Sung Han-kook (Korean: 성한국; born November 19, 1963) is a former badminton player and coach from South Korea.

== Career ==
Sung won the men's singles title at the 1986 U.S. Open and earlier that year, he won bronze at the 1986 Asian Games as well as men's team gold. He was also a part of the team that finished as runner-up at the inaugural Sudirman Cup in 1989.

In 1989, Sung married two-time All England winner Kim Yun-ja. Sung and Kim's daughter Sung Ji-hyun is also a badminton player.

After retiring, Sung had a long career as a coach, both for Korean professional teams and for the national team. He became the head coach of the national team in December 2010 and held the post until he was dismissed in August 2012 following a match-throwing scandal at the London Olympics.

== Achievements ==
=== Asian Games ===
Men's singles
Year	Venue	Opponent	Score	Result
1986	Olympic Gymnastics Arena, Seoul, South Korea	(China) Yang Yang	7–15, 14–17	Bronze

=== Asian Championships ===
Men's doubles
Year	Venue	Partner	Opponent	Score	Result
1983	Netaji Indoor Stadium, Calcutta, India	(South Korea) Yoo Byung-hwan	(China) He Shangquan (China) Jiang Guoliang	15–18, 4–15	Silver

=== IBF World Grand Prix ===
The World Badminton Grand Prix sanctioned by International Badminton Federation (IBF) from 1983 to 2006.

Men's doubles
Year	Tournament	Partner	Opponent	Score	Result
1983	Malaysia Open	(South Korea) Park Joo-bong	(Indonesia) Bobby Ertanto (Indonesia) Christian Hadinata	10–15, 5–15	(silver) Runner-up
1988	French Open	(South Korea) Park Joo-bong	(Malaysia) Razif Sidek (Malaysia) Jalani Sidek	15–8, 12–15, 15–12	(gold) Winner

Men's singles
Year	Tournament	Opponent	Score	Result
1985	Denmark Open	(Denmark) Morten Frost	4–15, 5–15	(silver) Runner-up

=== IBF International ===
Men's singles
Year	Tournament	Opponent	Score	Result
1986	U.S. Open	(Canada) Mike Butler	15–3, 15–9	(gold) Winner

Men's doubles
Year	Tournament	Partner	Opponent	Score	Result
1989	Hungarian International	(South Korea) Shon Jin-hwan	(Soviet Union) Andrey Antropov (Soviet Union) Sergey Sevryukov	15–11, 15–11	(gold) Winner

Mixed doubles
Year	Tournament	Partner	Opponent	Score	Result
1989	Hungarian International	(South Korea) Chung Myung-hee	(South Korea) Shon Jin-hwan (South Korea) Chung So-young	9–15, 15–10, 15–4	(gold) Winner
