= Jiang Guoliang =

Chinese badminton player

Jiang Guoliang 蒋国良
Personal information
- Born: 1965 (age 60–61) Zhejiang, China

Sport
- Country: China
- Sport: Badminton
- Handedness: Right
- Event: Men's doubles & Mixed doubles
Medal record
Men's badminton
Representing China
World Championships
Bronze medal – third place	1983 Copenhagen	Mixed doubles
World Cup
Bronze medal – third place	1989 Guangzhou	Mixed doubles
Sudirman Cup
Bronze medal – third place	1989 Jakarta	Mixed team
Thomas Cup
Silver medal – second place	1984 Kuala Lumpur	Men's team
Asian Games
Silver medal – second place	1986 Seoul	Men's team
Bronze medal – third place	1986 Seoul	Mixed doubles
Asian Championships
Gold medal – first place	1983 Calcutta	Men's doubles
Gold medal – first place	1983 Calcutta	Men's team

Jiang Guoliang (Chinese: 蒋国良; pinyin: Jiǎng Guóliáng, born 1965) is a retired male badminton player from China.

== Career ==
He won the bronze medal at the 1983 IBF World Championships in mixed doubles with Lin Ying. In the same year, he won the men's doubles championship with He Shangquan in the Asian Badminton Championships.

== Achievements ==
=== World Championships ===
Mixed doubles
Year	Venue	Partner	Opponent	Score	Result
1983	Brøndby Arena, Copenhagen,Denmark	(China) Lin Ying	(Denmark) Steen Fladberg (Denmark) Pia Nielsen	5–15, 6–15	Bronze

=== World Cup ===
Mixed doubles
Year	Venue	Partner	Opponent	Score	Result
1989	Canton Gymnasium, Guangzhou, China	(China) Nong Qunhua	(South Korea) Kim Moon-soo (South Korea) Chung So-young	7–15, 12–15	Bronze

=== Asian Games ===
Mixed doubles
Year	Venue	Partner	Opponent	Score	Result
1986	Olympic Gymnastics Arena, Seoul, South Korea	(China) Lin Ying	(South Korea) Lee Deuk-choon (South Korea) Chung So-young	9–15, 4–15	Bronze

=== Asian Championships ===
Men's doubles
Year	Venue	Partner	Opponent	Score	Result
1983	Netaji Indoor Stadium, Calcutta, India	(China) He Shangquan	(South Korea) Sung Han-kook (South Korea) Yoo Byung-hwan	18–15, 15–4	Gold

=== IBF World Grand Prix ===
The World Badminton Grand Prix was sanctioned by International Badminton Federation (IBF) from 1983 to 2006.

Men's doubles
Year	Tournament	Partner	Opponent	Score	Result
1984	Dutch Masters	(China) Ding Qiqing	(Indonesia) Christian Hadinata (Indonesia) Hadibowo Susanto	9–15, 10–15	(silver) Runner-up

Mixed Doubles
Year	Tournament	Partner	Opponent	Score	Result
1984	Dutch Masters	(China) Lin Ying	(England) Martin Dew (England) Gillian Gilks	10–15, 17–14, 10–15	(silver) Runner-up
1987	Hong Kong Open	(China) Nong Qunhua	(Scotland) Billy Gilliland (England) Gillian Gowers	14–18, 15–13, 7–15	(silver) Runner-up
1989	French Open	(China) Nong Qunhua	(China) Wang Pengren (China) Shi Fangjing	15–12, 5–15, 11–15	(silver) Runner-up

=== International Tournament ===
Men's doubles
Year	Tournament	Partner	Opponent	Score	Result
1982	German Open	(China) He Shangquan	(Denmark) Morten Frost (Denmark) Steen Fladberg	5–15, 6–15	(silver) Runner-up
