= Lee Eun-ku =

South Korean badminton player

Medal record

Men's badminton

Representing South Korea

World Championships
| Bronze medal – third place | 1983 Copenhagen | Men's doubles |

Asian Games
| Bronze medal – third place | 1982 New Delhi | Men's doubles |
| Bronze medal – third place | 1982 New Delhi | Men's team |

Lee Eun-ku is a retired male badminton player from South Korea.

== Career ==
He won the bronze medal at the 1983 IBF World Championships in men's doubles with Park Joo-bong.

== Achievements ==
=== World Championships ===
Men's doubles
| Year | Venue | Partner | Opponent | Score | Result |
|---|---|---|---|---|---|
| 1983 | Brøndbyhallen, Copenhagen, Denmark | (South Korea) Park Joo-bong | (England) Martin Dew (England) Mike Tredgett | 8–15, 15–2, 4–15 | Bronze |

=== Asian Games ===
Men's doubles
| Year | Venue | Partner | Opponent | Score | Result |
|---|---|---|---|---|---|
| 1982 | Indraprastha Indoor Stadium; New Delhi, India | (South Korea) Park Joo-bong | (China) Lin Jiangli (China) Luan Jin | 3–15, 15–10, 16–17 | Bronze |

=== International Tournament ===
Men's doubles
| Year | Tournament | Partner | Opponent | Score | Result |
|---|---|---|---|---|---|
| 1982 | Denmark Open | (South Korea) Park Joo-bong | (Indonesia) Christian Hadinata (Indonesia) Lius Pongoh | 15–9, 11–15, 18–16 | (gold) Winner |
| 1982 | India Open | (South Korea) Park Joo-bong | (Sweden) Stefan Karlsson (Sweden) Thomas Kihlström | 10–15, 12–15 | (silver) Runner-up |
