= Steen Fladberg =

Danish badminton player (born 1956)

Personal information
- Born: Steen Fladberg Nielsen; 11 October 1956 (age 70)

Sport
- Country: Denmark
- Sport: Badminton
- Event: Doubles
Medal record
Men's badminton
Representing Denmark
World Championships
Gold medal – first place	1983 Copenhagen	Men's doubles
Silver medal – second place	1983 Copenhagen	Mixed doubles
Bronze medal – third place	1980 Jakarta	Mixed doubles
World Cup
Silver medal – second place	1985 Jakarta	Mixed doubles
Silver medal – second place	1986 Bandung & Jakarta	Mixed doubles
Silver medal – second place	1987 Kuala Lumpur	Mixed doubles
World Senior Championships
Gold medal – first place	2003 Sofia	Mixed doubles 40+
Gold medal – first place	2003 Sofia	Men's doubles 45+
Gold medal – first place	2009 Punta Umbría	Men's doubles 50+
Thomas Cup
Silver medal – second place	1979 Jakarta	Men's team
Bronze medal – third place	1982 London	Men's team
European Championships
Gold medal – first place	1980 Groningen	Mixed team
Gold medal – first place	1986 Uppsala	Men's doubles
Gold medal – first place	1986 Uppsala	Mixed team
Gold medal – first place	1988 Kristiansand	Mixed doubles
Gold medal – first place	1988 Kristiansand	Mixed team
Silver medal – second place	1988 Kristiansand	Men's doubles
Bronze medal – third place	1982 Böblingen	Mixed team

Steen Fladberg Nielsen (born 11 October 1956) is a Danish badminton player, noted for his speed of foot, who excelled during the 1980s. Though a strong international level singles player, his biggest achievements came in doubles. He is now works as a director of Sport One Denmark.

== Career ==
Fladberg won the gold medal at the 1983 IBF World Championships in men's doubles with Jesper Helledie, defeating Mike Tredgett and Martin Dew 15–10, 15–10 in the final. He was a silver medalist at the same tournament in mixed doubles with Pia Nielsen.

He also won at the 1986 European Championships in the men's doubles with Helledie, and in 1988 in the mixed doubles with England's Gillian Clark.

== Personal information ==
Fladberg married the former Danish badminton player Kirsten Larsen. Their son Rasmus Fladberg is also a professional badminton player.

== Achievements ==
=== World Championships ===
Men's doubles
Year	Venue	Partner	Opponent	Score	Result
1983	Brøndbyhallen, Copenhagen, Denmark	(Denmark) Jesper Helledie	(England) Martin Dew (England) Mike Tredgett	15–10, 15–10	Gold

Mixed doubles
Year	Venue	Partner	Opponent	Score	Result
1980	Istora, Jakarta, Indonesia	(Denmark) Pia Nielsen	(England) Mike Tredgett (England) Nora Perry	8–15, 14–17	Bronze
1983	Brøndbyhallen, Copenhagen, Denmark	(Denmark) Pia Nielsen	(Sweden) Thomas Kihlström (England) Nora Perry	1–15, 11–15	Silver

=== World Cup ===
Mixed doubles
Year	Venue	Partner	Opponent	Score	Result
1985	Istora Senayan, Jakarta, Indonesia	(England) Nora Perry	(Indonesia) Christian Hadinata (Indonesia) Ivana Lie	11–15, 17–18	Silver
1986	Istora Senayan, Jakarta, Indonesia	(England) Gillian Clark	(Indonesia) Eddy Hartono (Indonesia) Verawaty Fadjrin	8–15, 15–17	Silver
1987	Stadium Negara, Kuala Lumpur, Malaysia	(England) Gillian Clark	(China) Wang Pengren (China) Shi Fangjing	11–15, 15–1, 4–15	Silver

=== World Senior Championships ===
Men's doubles doubles

Year	Venue	Event	Partner	Opponent	Score	Result	Ref
2003	Winter Sports Palace, Sofia, Bulgaria	Men's doubles 45+	(Denmark) Claus Andersen	(Scotland) Leon Douglas (Scotland) Dan Travers		Gold	
2009	Pabellón Municipal de Deportes, Punta Umbría, Spain	Men's doubles 50+	(Denmark) Jesper Helledie	(Thailand) Surapong Suharitdumrong (Thailand) Taveesup Waranusast	21–13, 20–22, 21–16	Gold	

Mixed doubles

Year	Venue	Event	Partner	Opponent	Score	Result	Ref
2003	Winter Sports Palace, Sofia, Bulgaria	Mixed doubles 40+	(Denmark) Annette Vollertzen	(Denmark) Morten Christensen (Denmark) Jeanette Koldsø	7–15, 15–6, 15–9	Gold	

=== European Championships ===
Men's doubles
Year	Venue	Partner	Opponent	Score	Result
1986	Fyrishallen, Uppsala, Sweden	(Denmark) Jesper Helledie	(Sweden) Stefan Karlsson (Sweden) Thomas Kihlström	15–12, 18–17	Gold
1988	Badmintonsenteret, Kristiansand, Norway	(Denmark) Jan Paulsen	(Denmark) Michael Kjeldsen (Denmark) Jens Peter Nierhoff	9–15, 11–15	Silver

Mixed doubles
Year	Venue	Partner	Opponent	Score	Result
1988	Badmintonsenteret, Kristiansand, Norway	(England) Gillian Clark	(Netherlands) Alex Meijer (Netherlands) Erica van Dijck	17–16, 4–15, 15–10	Gold

=== IBF World Grand Prix ===
The World Badminton Grand Prix sanctioned by International Badminton Federation (IBF) from 1983 to 2006.

Men's singles
Year	Tournament	Opponent	Score	Result
1987	Malaysia Open	(China) Yang Yang	15–4, 10–15, 7–15	(silver) Runner-up

Men's doubles
Year	Tournament	Partner	Opponent	Score	Result
1983	Swedish Open	(Denmark) Jesper Helledie	(Sweden) Stefan Karlsson (Sweden) Thomas Kihlström	4–15, 18–13, 15–10	(gold) Winner
1984	Chinese Taipei Open	(Denmark) Jesper Helledie	(Sweden) Stefan Karlsson (Sweden) Thomas Kihlström	3–15, 6–15	(silver) Runner-up
1985	Hong Kong Open	(Denmark) Jesper Helledie	(Denmark) Mark Christiansen (Denmark) Michael Kjeldsen	15–8, 7–15, 15–12	(gold) Winner
1985	Dutch Open	(Denmark) Jesper Helledie	(Denmark) Mark Christiansen (Denmark) Michael Kjeldsen	15–8, 15–9	(gold) Winner
1985	Scandinavian Open	(Denmark) Jesper Helledie	(England) Martin Dew (England) Dipak Tailor	15–12, 15–9	(gold) Winner
1986	German Open	(Denmark) Jesper Helledie	(South Korea) Kim Moon-soo (South Korea) Park Joo-bong	8–15, 12–15	(silver) Runner-up
1986	Scandinavian Open	(Denmark) Jesper Helledie	(England) Martin Dew (England) Dipak Tailor	15–9, 15–18, 15–7	(gold) Winner
1986	Carlton-Intersport Cup	(Denmark) Jesper Helledie	(England) Martin Dew (England) Dipak Tailor	9–15, 14–18	(silver) Runner-up
1988	German Open	(Denmark) Jan Paulsen	(China) Chen Hongyong (China) Chen Kang	15–8, 6–15, 18–13	(gold) Winner
1989	Poona Open	(Denmark) Jesper Knudsen	(China) Zhang Qiang (China) Zhou Jincan	10–15, 6–15	(silver) Runner-up

Mixed doubles
Year	Tournament	Partner	Opponent	Score	Result
1985	Dutch Open	(Denmark) Gitte Paulsen	(Denmark) Jesper Helledie (Denmark) Dorte Kjær	15–9, 15–11	(gold) Winner
1985	English Masters	(Denmark) Gitte Paulsen	(Scotland) Billy Gilliland (England) Gillian Gowers	7–15, 5–15	(silver) Runner-up
1986	Malaysia Open	(England) Gillian Gilks	(Indonesia) Bobby Ertanto (Indonesia) Verawaty Fadjrin	7–15, 15–18	(silver) Runner-up
1986	Indonesia Open	(England) Gillian Clark	(England) Steve Baddeley (England) Gillian Gowers	15–5, 15–4	(gold) Winner
1987	Chinese Taipei Open	(England) Gillian Clark	(Scotland) Billy Gilliland (England) Gillian Gowers	15–7, 14–18, 15–5	(gold) Winner
1987	Malaysia Open	(England) Gillian Clark	(Scotland) Billy Gilliland (England) Gillian Gowers	15–7, 15–6	(gold) Winner
1988	Poona Open	(England) Gillian Clark	(Denmark) Nils Skeby (Denmark) Dorte Kjær	15–8, 15–6	(gold) Winner
1988	German Open	(England) Gillian Clark	(England) Martin Dew (England) Gillian Gilks	9–15, 18–14, 15–4	(gold) Winner
1988	Thailand Open	(England) Gillian Clark	(China) Wang Pengren (China) Shi Fangjing	17–14, 4–15, 15–9	(gold) Winner
1988	English Masters	(England) Gillian Clark	(Denmark) Jesper Knudsen (Denmark) Nettie Nielsen	11–15, 6–15	(silver) Runner-up

=== IBF International ===
Men's singles
Year	Tournament	Opponent	Score	Result
1976	Swiss Open	(Denmark) Hans Olaf Birkholm	15–6, 15–4	(gold) Winner
1977	Swiss Open	(Denmark) Gert Helsholt	11–15, 2–15	(silver) Runner-up
1976	Czechoslovakian International	(Germany) Michael Schnaase	15–5, 5–15, 10–15	(silver) Runner-up
1978	Norwegian International	(Sweden) Sture Johnsson	10–15, 6–5 walkover	(gold) Winner
1979	Czechoslovakian International	(Denmark) Jens Peter Nierhoff	15–9, 15–2	(gold) Winner
1980	Canadian Open	(Denmark) Morten Frost	7–15, 11–15	(silver) Runner-up
1983	German Open	(Malaysia) Misbun Sidek	13–18, 6–15	(silver) Runner-up

Men's doubles
Year	Tournament	Partner	Opponent	Score	Result
1976	Czechoslovakian International	(Denmark) Morten Frost	(Germany) Wolfgang Bochow (Germany) Roland Maywald	12–15, 8–15	(silver) Runner-up
1978	Norwegian International	(Denmark) Jesper Helledie	(Denmark) Kenneth Larsen (Denmark) Mogens Neergaard	15–5, 15–8	(gold) Winner
1979	Swedish Open	(Denmark) Morten Frost	(Denmark) Flemming Delfs (Denmark) Steen Skovgaard	12–15, 15–12, 10–15	(silver) Runner-up
1979	Dutch Open	(Denmark) Morten Frost	(England) Elliot Stuart (England) Derek Talbot	8–15, 17–18	(silver) Runner-up
1979	Czechoslovakian International	(Denmark) Jens Peter Nierhoff	(Denmark) Kenneth Larsen (Denmark) Mogens Neergaard	15–11, 15–11	(gold) Winner
1980	Nordic Championships	(Denmark) Morten Frost	(Sweden) Claes Nordin (Sweden) Lars Wengberg	3–15, 15–3, 15–11	(gold) Winner
1980	Copenhagen Cup	(Denmark) Morten Frost	(Denmark) Flemming Delfs (Denmark) Steen Skovgaard	8–15, 6–15	(silver) Runner-up
1981	Nordic Championships	(Denmark) Morten Frost	(Denmark) Flemming Delfs (Denmark) Steen Skovgaard	15–9, 15–5	(gold) Winner
1981	Scandinavian Cup	(Denmark) Morten Frost	(China) Luan Jin (China) Lin Jiangli	11–15, 15–6, 12–15	(silver) Runner-up
1982	German Open	(Denmark) Morten Frost	(China) Jiang Guoliang (China) He Shangquan	15–5, 15–6	(gold) Winner
1982	Nordic Championships	(Denmark) Morten Frost	(Denmark) Jesper Helledie (Denmark) Steen Skovgaard	15–6, 15–18, 15–6	(gold) Winner
1983	Dutch Open	(Denmark) Jesper Helledie	(England) Martin Dew (England) Mike Tredgett	18–13, 15–10	(gold) Winner
1986	Nordic Championships	(Denmark) Morten Frost	(Sweden) Jan-Eric Antonsson (Sweden) Pär-Gunnar Jönsson	15–10, 15–12	(gold) Winner
1987	Nordic Championships	(Denmark) Jan Paulsen	(Sweden) Max Gandrup (Denmark) Thomas Lund	15–12, 18–15	(gold) Winner

Mixed doubles

Year	Tournament	Partner	Opponent	Score	Result
1978	Norwegian International	(Denmark) Lonny Bostofte	(Denmark) Mogens Neergaard (Denmark) Susanne Berg	15–12, 15–7	(gold) Winner
1980	Canadian Open	(Canada) Johanne Falardeau	(England) Mike Tredgett (England) Nora Perry	7–15, 9–15	(silver) Runner-up
1981	German Open	(Denmark) Pia Nielsen	(Netherlands) Rob Ridder (Netherlands) Marjan Ridder	12–15, 15–10, 15–10	(gold) Winner
1982	Scandinavian Cup	(Denmark) Pia Nielsen	(Sweden) Thomas Kihlström (England) Nora Perry	15–18, 12–15	(silver) Runner-up
1983	German Open	(Denmark) Pia Nielsen	(England) Dipak Tailor (England) Gillian Clark	11–15, 15–12, 15–11	(gold) Winner
1983	Nordic Championships	(Denmark) Grete Mogensen	(Sweden) Thomas Kihlström (Sweden) Maria Bengtsson	2–15, 15–9, 5–15	(silver) Runner-up
1985	Malaysia Master	(England) Nora Perry	(Sweden) Thomas Kihlström (Sweden) Christine Magnusson	15–9, 15–5	(gold) Winner
1985	Malaysia Master	(England) Nora Perry	(England) Martin Dew (England) Gillian Gilks	17–15, 15–12	(gold) Winner
1985	Malaysia Master	(England) Nora Perry	(Sweden) Stefan Karlsson (Sweden) Maria Bengtsson	15–10, 9–15, 10–15	(gold) Winner
1986	Nordic Championships	(Denmark) Gitte Paulsen	(Sweden) Jan-Eric Antonsson (Sweden) Maria Bengtsson	16–17, 3–15	(silver) Runner-up
