= Netaji Indoor Stadium =

Sports venue in Kolkata, India

Netaji Subhash Chandra Bose Indoor Stadium
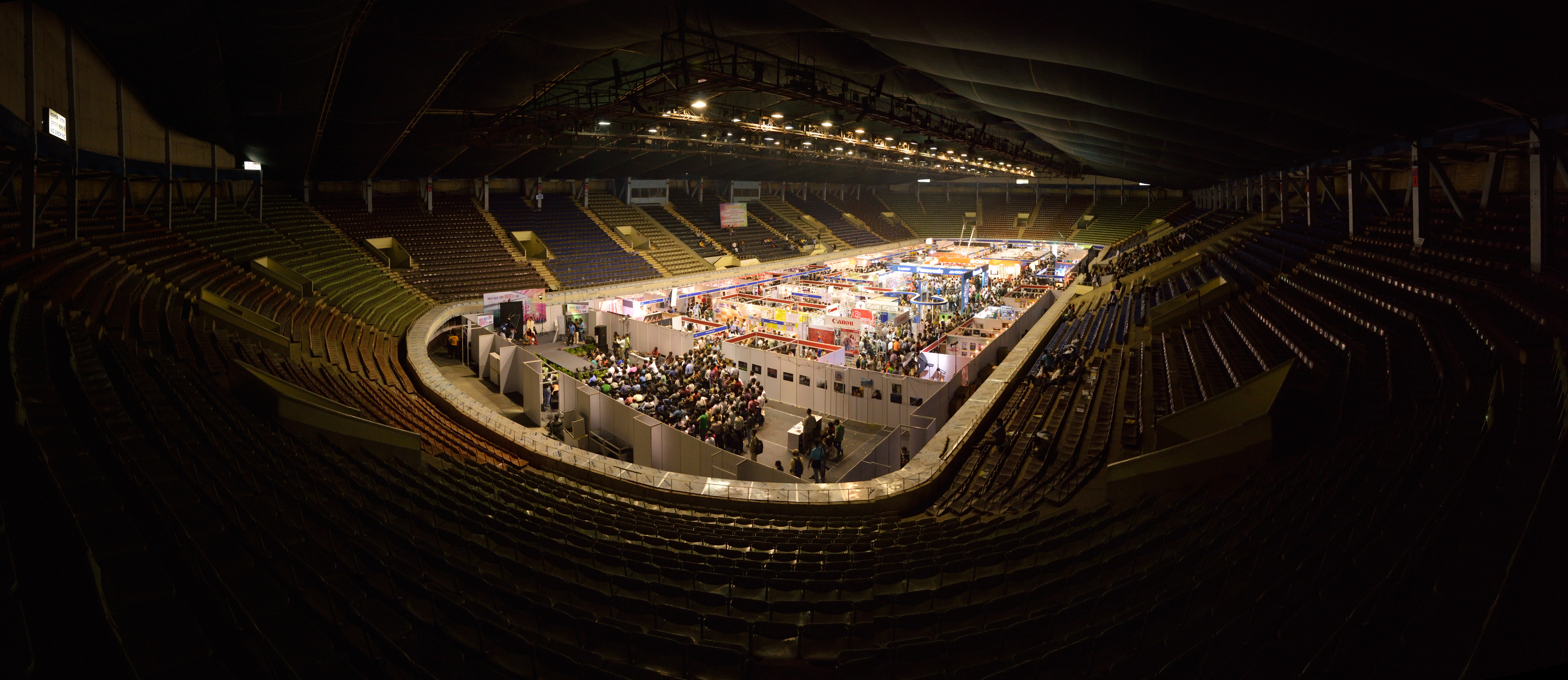
- Interactive map of Netaji Subhash Chandra Bose Indoor Stadium
- Full name: Netaji Subhash Chandra Bose Indoor Stadium
- Location: Kolkata, West Bengal, India
- Coordinates: 22°33′58.06″N 88°20′30″E
- Owner: Governor of West Bengal
- Operator: Governor of West Bengal
- Capacity: 12,126
- Field size: 60m radius

Construction
- Groundbreaking: 1950
- Built: 1975
- Opened: 1975
- Renovated: 2004

Tenants
- Sunfeast Open (until 2008); Bengal Warriors (since 2014); IFA Futsal Championship

The Netaji Subhash Chandra Bose Indoor Stadium is an indoor sports arena in Kolkata, West Bengal, India. The facility seats 12,000 people. This indoor stadium is located just beside Eden Gardens. It used to host the Sunfeast Open, a WTA Tour tennis tournament. Other international events hosted by the Stadium include the 1981 Asian Basketball Championship. The stadium has served as a home venue for the Bengal Warriors of the Pro Kabaddi League, including during the league's inaugural 2014 season.

The Netaji Indoor Stadium is used for a variety of sporting and non-sporting events, including trade fairs. It has also served as a counting centre during elections in West Bengal.

The venue was inaugurated in 1975 by the then Chief Minister of West Bengal, Siddhartha Shankar Ray, to host indoor sporting events, cultural programmes, and musical and other functions.

== History ==
Construction of the stadium was completed in January 1975. It was constructed specifically to host the 1975 World Table Tennis Championships, which were held at the venue that year.

On 13 September 1997, the stadium hosted the state funeral service of Mother Teresa. The funeral Mass was attended by thousands of mourners and international dignitaries.

The stadium has also hosted major cultural events. In December 2023, it hosted the opening ceremony of the Kolkata International Film Festival, whose 29th edition screened 219 films from 39 countries.

== See also ==
- List of indoor arenas in India
- List of tennis stadiums by capacity
