= Syed Modi =

Indian badminton player (1962–1988)

Syed Mahdi

Personal information
- Nicknames: Babua by family and friends
- Born: Syed Mahdi Hassan Zaidi; 31 December 1962 Gorakhpur, Uttar Pradesh, India
- Died: 28 July 1988 (aged 25) Lucknow, Uttar Pradesh, India
- Years active: 1976–1988
- Height: 5 ft 9 in (1.75 m)

Sport
- Country: India
- Sport: Badminton
- Coached by: Dipu Ghosh
- Event: Men's singles
Medal record
Men's badminton
Representing India
Commonwealth Games
Gold medal – first place	1982 Brisbane	Men's singles
Asian Games
Bronze medal – third place	1982 New Delhi	Men's singles
Bronze medal – third place	1982 New Delhi	Men's team
Bronze medal – third place	1986 Seoul	Men's team
Asian Championships
Silver medal – second place	1983 Calcutta	Men's team

Syed Modi (31 December 1962 – 28 July 1988), born as Syed Mehdi Hassan Zaidi, was an Indian badminton singles player and eight-time National Badminton champion (1980–1987). His most notable achievement at the international badminton circuit came in the form of men's singles title at the 1982 Commonwealth Games. He also won three other international titles, namely Austrian International (in 1983 & 1984) and USSR International (in 1985), both of which were European Badminton Circuit tournaments.

Modi's career was cut short in his prime when he was shot dead on 28 July 1988 in Lucknow as he came out of the K. D. Singh Babu Stadium after a practice session. The murder sent shockwaves through India, especially after the police filed murder charges against Modi's wife, then Ameeta Modi, and then Janata Dal leader (and Ameeta's future husband) Sanjaya Sinh.

== Early life and education ==
Syed Mehdi Hassan Zaidi was born in the town of Sardarnagar, 5 Km from Chauri Chaura in Uttar Pradesh. He grew up there, but his family hailed from Zaidi Sadat Kandipur (or Kadipur) near Jalalpur town in Ambedkar Nagar District, Uttar Pradesh. His father, Syed Meer Hassan Zaidi, worked in Sardarnagar Sugar Mill and his mother was a housewife. Syed Modi was the youngest of their eight children (six sons and two daughters). Modi's elder brothers were educated, but they worked and contributed significantly towards meeting family expenses and supporting Modi in his childhood, including for his badminton coaching, after it became clear that he had the potential to become a great player.

When Modi first began going to the local school, the person who entered his name in the school roster mistook his name "Mehdi" for the more common Indian surname "Modi" and wrote it down that way.

== Career ==
Modi fulfilled their hopes and prayers during his short life. In 1976, aged only 14, Syed Modi became junior national Badminton champion. The same year, Modi started training under P.K. Bhandari (Pushp Kumar Bhandari – chief badminton coach, N.I.S, Patiala) which continued until 1982. Thereafter, he trained under Dipu Ghosh, National Coach of Indian team.

In 1980, as soon as he was eligible (aged 18), Modi won the national badminton championship. In the same year, the department of sports (Government of India) recommended his name, and Modi was given a paying job as a Welfare Officer in the Indian Railways (NE). He was initially posted in Gorakhpur, nearest to his hometown and family. In 1982, his new coach wanted that he should train in Lucknow which had better facilities, so he was transferred there.

Syed Modi went on to win the national badminton championship every single year between 1980 and 1987 (eight times in a row). In 1981, he received the Arjuna Award from the Government of India. At the 1982 Asian Games, he won the bronze at the men's singles event. The same year (1982), he beat England's Nick Yates, 7–15, 15–5, 15–7 to take home the Men's singles Gold at the 1982 Commonwealth Games.In 1983 and 1984, he won the Australian International. His game started going downhill only in 1987–88 when his marriage came under strain and Modi lost the national badminton championship for the first time ever in 1988. A few months later, he was murdered.

== Achievements ==
=== Commonwealth Games ===
Men's singles
Year	Venue	Opponent	Score	Result
1982	Chandler Sports Hall, Brisbane, Australia	(England) Nick Yates	7–15, 15–6, 15–5	Gold

=== Asian Games ===
Men's singles
Year	Venue	Opponent	Score	Result
1982	Indraprastha Indoor Stadium; New Delhi, India	(China) Han Jian	1–15, 2–15	Bronze

=== IBF International ===
Men's singles
Year	Tournament	Opponent	Score	Result
1981	German International	(Malaysia) Misbun Sidek	17–18, 10–15	(silver) Runner-up
1983	Austrian International	(Pakistan) Tariq Farooq	15–5, 15–2	(gold) Winner
1984	Austrian International	(Soviet Union) Vitaliy Shmakov	15–2, 15–6	(gold) Winner
1985	USSR International	(Soviet Union) Andrey Antropov		(gold) Winner

Men's doubles
Year	Tournament	Partner	Opponent	Score	Result
1983	Austrian International	(India) Pradeep Gandhe	(India) Leroy D'Sa (India) Partho Ganguli	8–15, 13–18	(silver) Runner-up

=== Invitational tournaments ===
Men's doubles
Year	Tournament	Partner	Opponent	Score	Result
1978	Asian Invitational Championships; Capital Indoor Stadium; Peking, China	(India) Prakash Padukone	(China) Lin Shiquan (China) Tang Xianhu	3–15, 5–15	Silver

== Personal life ==
=== Marriage ===
In 1978, while he was a junior national champion, the 16-year-old Modi was selected for participating in an international tournament to be held in Beijing, China. A girl badminton player of his own age named Ameeta Kulkarni was in the women's team, and, as the Supreme Court would later record, "there arose intimacy between the two." Ameeta was engaged to Modi in the year 1982.

While Modi was a Muslim from north India, Ameeta was a Marathi Brahmin from Maharashtra, had grown up in cosmopolitan Mumbai and came from an affluent, upper-class English-educated family. Both families were stridently opposed to this marriage. However, Modi and Ameeta were adamant and got married on 14 May 1984 under the Special Marriage Act, though it was later said to be solemnized at te residence of Sanjaya Sinh as well.

As the facts later emerged during the Criminal cases related with Modi's murder, the couple began having problems after the marriage. Behavioural expectations and professional jealousies have been identified conclusively, but religious issues have also been hinted at in a Central Bureau of Investigation (CBI) report. CBI claimed after investigation that Ameeta started having positive leanings toward Sanjaya Sinh from the beginning of 1984 and soon they entered into extra-marital relations, patronized to some extent by Ameeta's mother Pushplata Kulkarni.

=== Murder ===
Two months after the birth of his daughter, Syed Modi was murdered. On the evening of 28 July 1988, at the age of 25, Modi was shot dead as he was coming out of KD Singh Babu Stadium, Lucknow after a routine practice. A brilliant career was cut short and a severe blow was dealt to badminton in India as Modi was touted to be a superstar like Prakash Padukone.

The CBI claimed extramarital relation between Sanjay Singh and Ameeta as being the main cause of murder. It said:

Infatuation of Sanjay Singh for Ameeta increased as time passed. Within Lucknow he would ring her up some time ten times a day; coming to Ameeta often twice at night to seek sexual gratification with her consent." As per CBI- "Sanjay Singh spent thousands of rupees to phone Ameeta from all over India. Syed Modi, the deceased resented this relationship. he suspected the infatuation of Sanjay Singh for his wife Ameeta and her most willing participation. They had frequent quarrels over this issue. Ameeta Modi wrote passionate love letters to Sanjay Singh.

CBI also presented the events and sequence of conspiracy that allegedly took place between these conspirators. Bhagwati Singh, Amar Bahadur Singh and Balai Singh, using Maruti Van No.HYG 1959, were said to be actual shooters. During investigation, Akhilesh Singh and Jitendera Singh admitted their alleged crimes.

On 17 September 1990, the Court of Sessions Lucknow discharged Sanjaya Sinh and Ameeta saying that the material on record does not, prima facie, establish any physical manifestation on the part of Ammeta in any part of the conspiracy, while also saying that on the basis of the entire facts, circumstances and the material before Court, it does not appear that Sanjaya Sinh can reasonably be connected with the murder. This order was upheld by the Allahabad High Court and the Supreme Court, which said- "The circumstantial evidence even if accepted in its entirety, as pointed out by the courts below creates only a suspicion of motive."

Later accused Balai Singh and Amar Bahadur Singh were murdered between 1992 and 1994.

Accused Akhilesh Singh filed a petition before the Allahabad High Court, which quashed the charges framed against him by Session Court and he was discharged in 1996.The Supreme Court upheld this decision in 2004 saying that once the main accused, Sanjaya Sinh, who is alleged to have hatched the conspiracy and who had the motive to kill Modi was discharged, then no purpose would be served in further proceeding against Akhilesh Sinh.

During Trial, the eye witness identified the accused Bhagwati Singh @ Pappu and not Jitendra Singh @ Tinku. Thus, Bhagwati Singh @ Pappu was convicted for murder by Session Court Lucknow in August 2009. In 2022, the Allahabad High Court upheld this order of conviction.

=== Aftermath ===
Later Modi's widow, Ameeta, married Sanjaya Sinh in April 1995. As per the facts stated in a Court case filed by Sanjaya's wife Garima Singh- "Thereafter it is stated that a news item was published in the daily newspaper The Pioneer' on 23.4.1995 viz. "Sanjai Singh marries Amita." It says that Sanjaya Sinh disclosed to Garima that he married Ameeta on 21 April 1995.

This marriage received sensational reportage in the press and became front-page news in India. It later turned out that Sanjay Singh had obtained a decree of divorce by stating a wrong address as his wife's residence, so that the Court had granted an ex-parte divorce because Garima could not appear in court despite repeated summons, because of wrong address.

== Memorial tournament ==
After Modi's death, a badminton tournament was constituted in his memory. The All India Syed Modi badminton championship was hosted each year in Lucknow, which turned into "Syed Modi International Challenge" in 2004, and starting December 2009 it would turn into "Syed Modi Grand Prix", organized by Badminton Association of India. This event later transformed to Super 300 level tournament in the newly introduced BWF World Tour format since 2018 under the name of "Syed Modi International" and since 2020 as the Syed Modi India International". The Railways of which he was an employee, opened the Syed Modi Railway Stadium and auditorium at his native place, Gorakhpur.

== Movie and TV Series ==
Actor and director Dev Anand made a thriller movie based on the murder of Modi. Sau Crore was released in 1991 with the role of Modi being played by Raman Kapoor. The movie was a surprise hit at the box office.

A 2020 ZEE5 web series The Chargesheet: Innocent or Guilty is based on the sensational murder of Syed Modi, though it does not officially acknowledge so, where the characters of Table Tennis player Shiraz Malik, his wife Antara Dixit, politician Ranveer Pratap Singh and his wife Chitrangada Singh prime-facie very apparently resemble Badminton player Syed Modi, his wife Amita Singh, then Amita Modi, Sanjay Sinh and his wife Garima Singh.
