= Leroy D'Sa =

Indian badminton player

Personal information
- Born: 12 October 1953 (age 72)

Sport
- Country: India
- Sport: Badminton

Doubles
- Current ranking: Retired
Medal record
Men's badminton
Representing India
Asian Games
Bronze medal – third place	1982 New Delhi	Men's doubles
Bronze medal – third place	1982 New Delhi	Mixed doubles
Bronze medal – third place	1982 New Delhi	Men's team
Bronze medal – third place	1986 Seoul	Men's team
Asian Championships
Silver medal – second place	1983 Calcutta	Men's team

Leroy Francis D'Sa (born 12 October 1953) is an Indian former badminton player.

D'sa remains the only player from India ever to have managed to claim four Asian games medals. He initially learned the basics of the sport in Hyderabad where his father was posted in Reserve Bank of India. Further he moved to Kanpur then Mumbai to develop his game even more. In Mumbai he was employed by the Railway in 1974. Indian contingent went on to win silver at the 1983 Asian championships in Calcutta. D'sa was part of that team. The same year he won Austrian International in men's doubles with Partho Ganguly. Again at the Asian games in 1986, he bagged men's team medal.

In 1982, D'sa claimed two bronze medals in men's and mixed doubles with Pradeep Gandhe and Kanwal Thakar Singh in a scratch pairing. Usually D'sa played men' doubles with Sanat Mishra in international circuit. He has 7 national championship titles to his name with different partners, Prakash Padukone, Ami Ghia, Sanat Mishra and Suresh Goel. D'sa was coaching the Pullela Gopichand when he won the 2001 All England title. He played at the state level until his late 50s and has shaped next generation of Indian doubles which includes players like Jwala Gutta, V. Diju, Sanave Thomas and many others. Currently he is training new crop of players in Hindu Gymkhana in Mumbai.

== Achievements ==
=== Asian Games ===
Men's doubles

Year	Venue	Partner	Opponent	Score	Result
1982	Indraprastha Indoor Stadium, New Delhi, India	(India) Pradeep Gandhe	(Indonesia) Christian Hadinata (Indonesia) Icuk Sugiarto	15–11, 2–15, 5–15	Bronze

Mixed doubles

Year	Venue	Partner	Opponent	Score	Result
1982	Indraprastha Indoor Stadium, New Delhi, India	(India) Kanwal Thakar Singh	(Indonesia) Christian Hadinata (Indonesia) Ivana Lie	10–15, 3–15	Bronze

=== IBF International ===
Men's doubles

Year	Tournament	Partner	Opponent	Score	Result
1983	Austrian International	(India) Partho Ganguli	(India) Pradeep Gandhe (India) Syed Modi	15–8, 18–13	(gold) Winner
