= Partho Ganguli =

Indian badminton player

Sport
- Country: India
- Sport: Badminton
Medal record
Representing India
Men's badminton
Asian Games
Bronze medal – third place	1974 Tehran	Men's team
Bronze medal – third place	1982 New Delhi	Men's team
Asian Championships
Silver medal – second place	1983 Calcutta	Men's team

Partho Ganguli also spelt Ganguly is an Indian former badminton player. He was the national doubles champion four times and bronze medalist in mixed doubles once.He was awarded the Arjuna award in 1982.

== Achievements ==
=== IBF International ===
Men's doubles
Year	Tournament	Partner	Opponent	Score	Result
1983	French International	(India) Vikram Singh	(West Germany) Stefan Frey (West Germany) Thomas Künstler	10–15, 15–9, 15–8	(gold) Winner
1983	Austrian International	(India) Leroy D'Sa	(India) Pradeep Gandhe (India) Syed Modi	15–8, 18–13	(gold) Winner
