= Pradeep Gandhe =

Indian badminton player

Personal information
- Height: 5"10

Sport
- Country: India
- Sport: Badminton
- Event: Mens Badminton Doubles
Medal record
Representing India
Men's badminton
Asian Games
Bronze medal – third place	1982 New Delhi	Men's doubles
Bronze medal – third place	1982 New Delhi	Men's team

Pradeep Gandhe is a former Indian badminton player. He was the national doubles champion and bronze medalist in mixed doubles twice.

== Achievements ==
Pradeep has played at several competitive events such as the National Doubles Championship, the National Mixed Doubles Championship, the Asian Games and the IBF International games.

=== Asian Games ===
Men's doubles
Year	Venue	Partner	Opponent	Score	Result
1982	Indraprastha Indoor Stadium, New Delhi, India	(India) Leroy D'Sa	(Indonesia) Christian Hadinata (Indonesia) Icuk Sugiarto	15–11, 2–15, 5–15	Bronze

=== IBF International ===
Men's doubles
Year	Tournament	Partner	Opponent	Score	Result
1983	Austrian International	(India) Syed Modi	(India) Leroy D'Sa (India) Partho Ganguli	8–15, 13–18	(silver) Runner-up
