= Uday Pawar =

Indian badminton player

Sport
- Country: India
- Sport: Badminton
Medal record
Representing India
Men's badminton
Asian Games
Bronze medal – third place	1982 New Delhi	Men's team
Bronze medal – third place	1986 Seoul	Men's team
Asian Championships
Silver medal – second place	1983 Calcutta	Men's team

Uday Pawar is a former badminton player. He was the national doubles champion four times. He was the bronze medalist in badminton at the 1982 Asian Games in the Men's team event and again won the bronze medalist in badminton at the 1986 Asian Games in the Men's team event.
