= List of Commonwealth Games medallists in badminton =

This is the complete list of Commonwealth Games medallists in badminton from 1966 to 2022.

== 1966 British Empire and Commonwealth Games ==
Event	Gold	Silver	Bronze
Men's singles	(Malaysia) Tan Aik Huang	(Malaysia) Yew Cheng Hoe	(India) Dinesh Khanna
Men's doubles	(Malaysia) Tan Aik Huang (Malaysia) Yew Cheng Hoe	(Malaysia) Ng Boon Bee (Malaysia) Tan Yee Khan	(England) David Horton (England) Roger Mills
Women's singles	(England) Angela Bairstow	(Canada) Sharon Whittaker	(England) Ursula Smith
Women's doubles	(England) Helen Horton (England) Ursula Smith	(England) Angela Bairstow (England) Iris Rogers	(Malaysia) Rosalind Singha Ang (Malaysia) Teoh Siew Yong
Mixed doubles	(England) Roger Mills (England) Angela Bairstow	(England) Tony Jordan (England) Helen Horton	(Scotland) Robert McCoig (Scotland) Muriel Ferguson

== 1970 British Commonwealth Games ==
Event	Gold	Silver	Bronze
Men's singles	(Canada) Jamie Paulson	(England) Paul Whetnall	(England) Ray Sharp
Men's doubles	(Malaysia) Ng Boon Bee (Malaysia) Punch Gunalan	(Malaysia) Ng Tat Wai (Malaysia) Tan Soon Hooi	(Canada) Yves Paré (Canada) Jamie Paulson
Women's singles	(England) Margaret Beck	(England) Gillian Perrin	(England) Margaret Boxall
Women's doubles	(England) Margaret Boxall (England) Susan Whetnall	(England) Gillian Perrin (England) Julie Rickard	(Malaysia) Rosalind Singha Ang (Malaysia) Teoh Siew Yong
Mixed doubles	(England) Derek Talbot (England) Margaret Boxall	(England) Roger Mills (England) Gillian Perrin	(England) David Eddy (England) Susan Whetnall

== 1974 British Commonwealth Games ==
Event	Gold	Silver	Bronze
Men's singles	(Malaysia) Punch Gunalan	(Canada) Jamie Paulson	(England) Derek Talbot
Men's doubles	(England) Elliot Stuart (England) Derek Talbot	(England) Ray Stevens (England) Mike Tredgett	(Malaysia) Punch Gunalan (Malaysia) Dominic Soong
Women's singles	(England) Gillian Gilks	(England) Margaret Beck	(Malaysia) Sylvia Ng
Women's doubles	(England) Margaret Beck (England) Gillian Gilks	(England) Margaret Boxall (England) Susan Whetnall	(Malaysia) Rosalind Singha Ang (Malaysia) Sylvia Ng
Mixed doubles	(England) Derek Talbot (England) Gillian Gilks	(England) Paul Whetnall (England) Nora Gardner	(England) Elliot Stuart (England) Susan Whetnall

== 1978 Commonwealth Games ==
Event	Gold	Silver	Bronze
Men's singles	(India) Prakash Padukone	(England) Derek Talbot	(England) Ray Stevens
Men's doubles	(England) Ray Stevens (England) Mike Tredgett	(Malaysia) Moo Foot Lian (Malaysia) Ong Teong Boon	(New Zealand) Bryan Purser (New Zealand) Richard Purser
Women's singles	(Malaysia) Sylvia Ng	(Malaysia) Katherine Swee Phek Teh	(Canada) Wendy Clarkson
Women's doubles	(England) Nora Perry-Gardner (England) Anne Statt	(Canada) Claire Backhouse (Canada) Jane Youngberg	(India) Ami Ghia (India) Kanwal Singh
Mixed doubles	(England) Mike Tredgett (England) Nora Perry-Gardner	(Scotland) Billy Gilliland (Scotland) Joanne Flockhart	(England) Derek Talbot (England) Barbara Sutton
Teams	(England) England; Anne Statt; Barbara Sutton; David Eddy; Derek Talbot; Jane Webster; Karen Bridge; Kevin Jolly; Mike Tredgett; Nora Perry-Gardner; Raymond Stevens	(Canada) Canada; Claire Backhouse; Gregory Carter; Jamie McKee; Jane Youngberg; Johanne Falardeau; John Czich; Kenneth Priestman; Lucio Fabris; Sharon Crawford; Wendy Clarkson	(Malaysia) Malaysia; Abu Bakar Sufian; Chee Geok Whee; Moo Foot Lian; James Selvaraj; Katherine Swee Phek Teh; Saw Swee Leong; Sylvia Ng; Ong Teong Boon

== 1982 Commonwealth Games ==
Event	Gold	Silver	Bronze
Men's singles	(India) Syed Modi	(England) Nick Yates	(Malaysia) Razif Sidek
Men's doubles	(Malaysia) Ong Beng Teong (Malaysia) Razif Sidek	(England) Martin Dew (England) Nick Yates	(Canada) Paul Johnson (Canada) Pat Tryon
Women's singles	(England) Helen Troke	(England) Sally Podger	(England) Gillian Clark
Women's doubles	(Canada) Claire Backhouse (Canada) Johanne Falardeau	(England) Gillian Clark (England) Karen Beckman	(England) Karen Chapman (England) Sally Podger
Mixed doubles	(England) Martin Dew (England) Karen Chapman	(England) Duncan Bridge (England) Karen Beckman	(New Zealand) Steve Wilson (New Zealand) Robin Denton
Teams	(England) England; Dipak Tailor; Duncan Bridge; Gillian Clark; Helen Troke; Karen Beckman; Karen Chapman; Martin Dew; Nick Yates; Sally Podger; Steve Baddeley	(Canada) Canada; Claire Backhouse; Denyse Julien; Jane Youngberg; Johanne Falardeau; Keith Priestman; Mark Freitag; Patrick Tryon; Paul Johnson; Robert MacDougall; Sandra Skillings	(Australia) Australia; Audrey Swaby; Darren McDonald; Jane Forrest; Jennifer Cunningham; Julie McDonald; Mark Harry; Maxine Evans; Michael Scandolera; Paul Morgan; Trevor James

== 1986 Commonwealth Games ==
Event	Gold	Silver	Bronze
Men's singles	(England) Steve Baddeley	(Australia) Sze Yu	(England) Nick Yates
Men's doubles	(Scotland) Billy Gilliland (Scotland) Dan Travers	(England) Andy Goode (England) Nigel Tier	(New Zealand) Kerrin Harrison (New Zealand) Glenn Stewart
Women's singles	(England) Helen Troke	(England) Fiona Elliott	(England) Gillian Clark
Women's doubles	(England) Gillian Clark (England) Gillian Gowers	(Canada) Johanne Falardeau (Canada) Denyse Julien	(England) Fiona Elliott (England) Helen Troke
Mixed doubles	(Australia) Michael Scandolera (Australia) Audrey Tuckey	(England) Andy Goode (England) Fiona Elliott	(Scotland) Billy Gilliland (Scotland) Christine Heatly
Teams	(England) England; Andy Goode; Fiona Elliott; Gillian Clark; Gillian Gowers; Helen Troke; Nigel Tier; Nick Yates; Richard Outterside; Steve Baddeley	(Canada) Canada; Claire Backhouse-Sharpe; Denyse Julien; John Goss; Johanne Falardeau; Ken Poole; Linda Cloutier-Marks; Mike deBelle; Mike Bitten; Michael Butler; Sandra Skillings	(Australia) Australia; Audrey Tuckey; Darren McDonald; Gordon Lang; Julie McDonald; Karen Jupp; Michael Scandolera; Paul Heng Kong; Rhonda Cator; Tracey Small; Sze Yu

== 1990 Commonwealth Games ==
Event	Gold	Silver	Bronze
Men's singles	(Malaysia) Rashid Sidek	(Malaysia) Foo Kok Keong	(England) Darren Hall
Men's doubles	(Malaysia) Jalani Sidek (Malaysia) Razif Sidek	(Malaysia) Cheah Soon Kit (Malaysia) Rashid Sidek	(Canada) Mike Bitten (Canada) Bryan Blanshard
Women's singles	(England) Fiona Smith	(Canada) Denyse Julien	(England) Helen Troke
Women's doubles	(England) Sara Sankey (England) Fiona Smith	(England) Gillian Clark (England) Gillian Gowers	(Canada) Johanne Falardeau (Canada) Denyse Julien
Mixed doubles	(Hong Kong) Chan Chi Choi (Hong Kong) Amy Chan	(England) Miles Johnson (England) Sara Sankey	(England) Andy Goode (England) Gillian Clark
Teams	(England) England; Andy Goode; Darren Hall; Fiona Smith; Gillian Clark; Gillian Gowers; Helen Troke; Miles Johnson; Sara Sankey; Steve Baddeley; Steve Butler	(Canada) Canada; Anil Kaul; Bryan Blanshard; Claire Backhouse-Sharpe; David Humble; Denyse Julien; Doris Piché; Johanne Falardeau; Linda Cloutier-Marks; Mike Bitten; Michael Butler	(Hong Kong) Hong Kong; Amy Chan; Chi Choi Chan; Chan Kin Ngai; Man Wa Chan; Mei Yin Chui; Ng Pak Kum; Chan Siu Kwong; Yick Kei Yeung; Yin Sat Cheng

== 1994 Commonwealth Games ==
Event	Gold	Silver	Bronze
Men's singles	(Malaysia) Rashid Sidek	(Malaysia) Ong Ewe Hock	(New Zealand) Nick Hall
Men's singles	(Malaysia) Rashid Sidek	(Malaysia) Ong Ewe Hock	(England) Anders Nielsen
Men's doubles	(Malaysia) Cheah Soon Kit (Malaysia) Soo Beng Kiang	(England) Simon Archer (England) Chris Hunt	(Australia) Peter Blackburn (Australia) Mark Nichols
Men's doubles	(Malaysia) Cheah Soon Kit (Malaysia) Soo Beng Kiang	(England) Simon Archer (England) Chris Hunt	(Malaysia) Ong Ewe Hock (Malaysia) Tan Kim Her
Women's singles	(Australia) Lisa Campbell	(Canada) Si-An Deng	(New Zealand) Rhona Robertson
Women's singles	(Australia) Lisa Campbell	(Canada) Si-An Deng	(Australia) Song Yang
Women's doubles	(England) Joanne Muggeridge (England) Joanne Wright	(England) Julie Bradbury (England) Gillian Clark	(Canada) Si-An Deng (Canada) Denyse Julien
Women's doubles	(England) Joanne Muggeridge (England) Joanne Wright	(England) Julie Bradbury (England) Gillian Clark	(Malaysia) Lee Wai Leng (Malaysia) Tan Lee Wai
Mixed doubles	(England) Chris Hunt (England) Gillian Clark	(England) Simon Archer (England) Julie Bradbury	(Australia) Peter Blackburn (Australia) Rhonda Cator
Mixed doubles	(England) Chris Hunt (England) Gillian Clark	(England) Simon Archer (England) Julie Bradbury	(England) Nick Ponting (England) Joanne Wright
Teams	England	Malaysia	Australia
Teams	England	Malaysia	Hong Kong

== 1998 Commonwealth Games ==
Event	Gold	Silver	Bronze
Men's singles	(Malaysia) Wong Choong Hann	(Malaysia) Yong Hock Kin	(India) Pullela Gopichand
Men's singles	(Malaysia) Wong Choong Hann	(Malaysia) Yong Hock Kin	(England) Darren Hall
Women's singles	(Wales) Kelly Morgan	(India) Aparna Popat	(England) Tracey Hallam
Women's singles	(Wales) Kelly Morgan	(India) Aparna Popat	(England) Julia Mann
Men's doubles	(Malaysia) Choong Tan Fook (Malaysia) Lee Wan Wah	(Malaysia) Cheah Soon Kit (Malaysia) Yap Kim Hock	(England) Simon Archer (England) Chris Hunt
Men's doubles	(Malaysia) Choong Tan Fook (Malaysia) Lee Wan Wah	(Malaysia) Cheah Soon Kit (Malaysia) Yap Kim Hock	(England) Julian Robertson (England) Nathan Robertson
Women's doubles	(England) Joanne Goode (England) Donna Kellogg	(Malaysia) Chor Hooi Yee (Malaysia) Lim Pek Siah	(New Zealand) Tammy Jenkins (New Zealand) Rhona Robertson
Women's doubles	(England) Joanne Goode (England) Donna Kellogg	(Malaysia) Chor Hooi Yee (Malaysia) Lim Pek Siah	(Scotland) Elinor Middlemiss (Scotland) Sandra Watt
Mixed doubles	(England) Simon Archer (England) Joanne Goode	(England) Nathan Robertson (England) Joanne Davies	(Australia) Peter Blackburn (Australia) Rhonda Cator
Mixed doubles	(England) Simon Archer (England) Joanne Goode	(England) Nathan Robertson (England) Joanne Davies	(England) Chris Hunt (England) Donna Kellogg
Men Teams	(Malaysia) Malaysia; Wong Choong Hann; Ong Ewe Hock; Yong Hock Kin; Yap Kim Hock; Cheah Soon Kit; Choong Tan Fook; Lee Wan Wah	(India) India; Abhinn Shyam Gupta; George Thomas; Pullela Gopichand; Jaseel P. Ismail; Marcos Bristow; Nikhil Kanetkar; Vincent Lobo	(England) England; Chris Hunt; Darren Hall; Julian Robertson; Mark Constable; Nathan Robertson; Peter Knowles; Simon Archer
Men Teams	(Malaysia) Malaysia; Wong Choong Hann; Ong Ewe Hock; Yong Hock Kin; Yap Kim Hock; Cheah Soon Kit; Choong Tan Fook; Lee Wan Wah	(India) India; Abhinn Shyam Gupta; George Thomas; Pullela Gopichand; Jaseel P. Ismail; Marcos Bristow; Nikhil Kanetkar; Vincent Lobo	(New Zealand) New Zealand; Anton Gargiulo; Chris Blair; Daniel Shirley; Dean Galt; Geoff Bellingham; Jarrod King; Nick Hall
Women Teams	(England) England; Donna Kellogg; Joanne Davies; Joanne Goode; Julia Mann; Rebecca Pantaney; Sara Sankey; Tracey Hallam	(Malaysia) Malaysia; Chor Hooi Yee; Joanne Quay; Ng Mee Fen; Norhasikin Amin; Law Pei Pei; Lim Pek Siah; Woon Sze Mei	(India) India; Aparna Popat; Archana Deodhar; Deepthi Chapala; Madhumita Bisht; Manjusha Kanwar; K. Neelima Chowdary; P. V. V. Lakshmi
Women Teams	(England) England; Donna Kellogg; Joanne Davies; Joanne Goode; Julia Mann; Rebecca Pantaney; Sara Sankey; Tracey Hallam	(Malaysia) Malaysia; Chor Hooi Yee; Joanne Quay; Ng Mee Fen; Norhasikin Amin; Law Pei Pei; Lim Pek Siah; Woon Sze Mei	(Australia) Australia; Amanda Hardy; Kate Wilson-Smith; Kellie Lucas; Michaela Smith; Rayoni Head; Rhonda Cator; Sarah Hicks

== 2002 Commonwealth Games ==
Event	Gold	Silver	Bronze
Men's singles	(Malaysia) Muhammad Hafiz Hashim	(Malaysia) Lee Tsuen Seng	(Malaysia) Wong Choong Hann
Men's singles	(Malaysia) Muhammad Hafiz Hashim	(Malaysia) Lee Tsuen Seng	(Wales) Richard Vaughan
Women's singles	(Singapore) Li Li	(England) Tracey Hallam	(Malaysia) Ng Mee Fen
Women's singles	(Singapore) Li Li	(England) Tracey Hallam	(India) Aparna Popat
Men's doubles	(Malaysia) Chan Chong Ming (Malaysia) Chew Choon Eng	(Malaysia) Chang Kim Wai (Malaysia) Choong Tan Fook	(England) James Anderson (England) Simon Archer
Men's doubles	(Malaysia) Chan Chong Ming (Malaysia) Chew Choon Eng	(Malaysia) Chang Kim Wai (Malaysia) Choong Tan Fook	(England) Anthony Clark (England) Nathan Robertson
Women's doubles	(Malaysia) Ang Li Peng (Malaysia) Lim Pek Siah	(New Zealand) Nicole Gordon (New Zealand) Sara Petersen	(England) Gail Emms (England) Joanne Goode
Women's doubles	(Malaysia) Ang Li Peng (Malaysia) Lim Pek Siah	(New Zealand) Nicole Gordon (New Zealand) Sara Petersen	(Malaysia) Chin Eei Hui (Malaysia) Wong Pei Tty
Mixed doubles	(England) Simon Archer (England) Joanne Goode	(Malaysia) Chew Choon Eng (Malaysia) Chin Eei Hui	(England) Anthony Clark (England) Sara Sankey
Mixed doubles	(England) Simon Archer (England) Joanne Goode	(Malaysia) Chew Choon Eng (Malaysia) Chin Eei Hui	(New Zealand) Daniel Shirley (New Zealand) Sara Petersen
Teams	England	Singapore	New Zealand
Teams	England	Singapore	Scotland

== 2006 Commonwealth Games ==
Event	Gold	Silver	Bronze
Men's singles	(Malaysia) Lee Chong Wei	(Malaysia) Wong Choong Hann	(India) Chetan Anand
Women's singles	(England) Tracey Hallam	(Malaysia) Wong Mew Choo	(Scotland) Susan Hughes
Men's doubles	(Malaysia) Chan Chong Ming (Malaysia) Koo Kien Keat	(Malaysia) Choong Tan Fook (Malaysia) Wong Choong Hann	(England) Robert Blair (England) Anthony Clark
Women's doubles	(Malaysia) Chin Eei Hui (Malaysia) Wong Pei Tty	(Singapore) Jiang Yanmei (Singapore) Li Yujia	(England) Gail Emms (England) Donna Kellogg
Mixed doubles	(England) Nathan Robertson (England) Gail Emms	(New Zealand) Daniel Shirley (New Zealand) Sara Runesten	(Singapore) Hendri Saputra (Singapore) Li Yujia
Teams	(Malaysia) Malaysia; Chan Chong Ming; Lee Chong Wei; Wong Choong Hann; Chin Eei Hui; Julia Wong Pei Xian; Koo Kien Keat; Wong Mew Choo; Wong Pei Tty; Ooi Sock Ai; Choong Tan Fook	(England) England; Aamir Ghaffar; Anthony Clark; Donna Kellogg; Ella Tripp; Gail Emms; Joanne Nicholas; Nathan Robertson; Robert Blair; Simon Archer; Tracey Hallam	(India) India; Anup Sridhar; Aparna Popat; Chetan Anand; Jwala Gutta; Rupesh Kumar; Saina Nehwal; Sanave Thomas; Shruti Kurien; Trupti Murgunde; Valiyaveetil Diju

== 2010 Commonwealth Games ==
Event	Gold	Silver	Bronze
Men's singles	(Malaysia) Lee Chong Wei	(England) Rajiv Ouseph	(India) Parupalli Kashyap
Women's singles	(India) Saina Nehwal	(Malaysia) Wong Mew Choo	(England) Elizabeth Cann
Men's doubles	(Malaysia) Koo Kien Keat (Malaysia) Tan Boon Heong	(England) Anthony Clark (England) Nathan Robertson	(Singapore) Hendri Saputra (Singapore) Hendra Wijaya
Women's doubles	(India) Jwala Gutta (India) Ashwini Ponnappa	(Singapore) Shinta Mulia Sari (Singapore) Yao Lei	(Australia) Tang He Tian (Australia) Kate Wilson-Smith
Mixed doubles	(Malaysia) Koo Kien Keat (Malaysia) Chin Eei Hui	(England) Nathan Robertson (England) Jenny Wallwork	(Singapore) Chayut Triyachart (Singapore) Yao Lei
Teams	(Malaysia) Malaysia; Chan Peng Soon; Lyddia Cheah; Chin Eei Hui; Goh Liu Ying; Muhammad Hafiz Hashim; Koo Kien Keat; Lee Chong Wei; Tan Boon Heong; Wong Mew Choo; Woon Khe Wei	(India) India; Sanave Arattukulam; Aparna Balan; Chetan Anand; Jwala Gutta; Rupesh Kumar; Ashwini Ponnappa; Aditi Mutatkar; Saina Nehwal; Parupalli Kashyap; Valiyaveetil Diju	(England) England; Chris Adcock; Mariana Agathangelou; Carl Baxter; Elizabeth Cann; Anthony Clark; Heather Olver; Rajiv Ouseph; Nathan Robertson; Jenny Wallwork; Gabrielle White

== 2014 Commonwealth Games ==
Event	Gold	Silver	Bronze
Men's singles	(India) Parupalli Kashyap	(Singapore) Derek Wong	(India) Gurusai Dutt
Women's singles	(Canada) Michelle Li	(Scotland) Kirsty Gilmour	(India) P. V. Sindhu
Men's doubles	(Malaysia) Goh V Shem (Malaysia) Tan Wee Kiong	(Singapore) Danny Bawa Chrisnanta (Singapore) Chayut Triyachart	(England) Chris Langridge (England) Peter Mills
Women's doubles	(Malaysia) Vivian Hoo (Malaysia) Woon Khe Wei	(India) Jwala Gutta (India) Ashwini Ponnappa	(England) Gabby Adcock (England) Lauren Smith
Mixed doubles	(England) Chris Adcock (England) Gabby Adcock	(England) Chris Langridge (England) Heather Olver	(Scotland) Robert Blair (Scotland) Imogen Bankier
Mixed team	Malaysia; Chong Wei Feng; Liew Daren; Tee Jing Yi; Woon Khe Wei; Lai Pei Jing; Lim Yin Loo; Chan Peng Soon; Vivian Hoo; Tan Wee Kiong; Goh V Shem	England; Andrew Ellis; Chris Adcock; Chris Langridge; Gabby Adcock; Heather Olver; Kate Robertshaw; Lauren Smith; Peter Mills; Rajiv Ouseph; Sarah Walker	Singapore; Huang Chao; Chayut Triyachart; Danny Bawa Chrisnanta; Derek Wong; Yao Lei; Fu Mingtian; Shinta Mulia Sari; Terry Hee; Vanessa Neo; Liang Xiaoyu

== 2018 Commonwealth Games ==
Event	Gold	Silver	Bronze
Men's singles	(Malaysia) Lee Chong Wei	(India) Srikanth Kidambi	(England) Rajiv Ouseph
Women's singles	(India) Saina Nehwal	(India) P. V. Sindhu	(Scotland) Kirsty Gilmour
Men's doubles	(England) Marcus Ellis (England) Chris Langridge	(India) Satwiksairaj Rankireddy (India) Chirag Shetty	(Malaysia) Goh V Shem (Malaysia) Tan Wee Kiong
Women's doubles	(Malaysia) Chow Mei Kuan (Malaysia) Vivian Hoo	(England) Lauren Smith (England) Sarah Walker	(India) Ashwini Ponnappa (India) N. Sikki Reddy
Mixed doubles	(England) Chris Adcock (England) Gabby Adcock	(England) Marcus Ellis (England) Lauren Smith	(Malaysia) Chan Peng Soon (Malaysia) Goh Liu Ying
Mixed team	India; Srikanth Kidambi; Saina Nehwal; Satwiksairaj Rankireddy; Ashwini Ponnappa; Pranav Chopra; Chirag Shetty; N. Sikki Reddy; Ruthvika Gadde; P. V. Sindhu; Prannoy H. S.	Malaysia; Chan Peng Soon; Soniia Cheah; Chow Mei Kuan; Goh Liu Ying; Goh Soon Huat; Goh V Shem; Vivian Hoo; Shevon Jemie Lai; Lee Chong Wei; Tan Wee Kiong	England; Chris Adcock; Gabby Adcock; Chloe Birch; Marcus Ellis; Ben Lane; Chris Langridge; Rajiv Ouseph; Jessica Pugh; Lauren Smith; Sarah Walker

== 2022 Commonwealth Games ==
Event	Gold	Silver	Bronze
Men's singles	(India) Lakshya Sen	(Malaysia) Ng Tze Yong	(India) Srikanth Kidambi
Women's singles	(India) P. V. Sindhu	(Canada) Michelle Li	(Singapore) Yeo Jia Min
Men's doubles	(India) Satwiksairaj Rankireddy (India) Chirag Shetty	(England) Ben Lane (England) Sean Vendy	(Malaysia) Aaron Chia (Malaysia) Soh Wooi Yik
Women's doubles	(Malaysia) Pearly Tan (Malaysia) Thinaah Muralitharan	(England) Chloe Birch (England) Lauren Smith	(India) Treesa Jolly (India) Gayatri Gopichand
Mixed doubles	(Singapore) Terry Hee (Singapore) Tan Wei Han	(England) Marcus Ellis (England) Lauren Smith	(Malaysia) Tan Kian Meng (Malaysia) Lai Pei Jing
Mixed team	Malaysia; Ng Tze Yong; Aaron Chia; Soh Wooi Yik; Goh Jin Wei; Pearly Tan; Thinaah Muralitharan; Chan Peng Soon; Cheah Yee See; Tan Kian Meng; Lai Pei Jing	India; Lakshya Sen; Srikanth Kidambi; B. Sumeeth Reddy; Satwiksairaj Rankireddy; Chirag Shetty; P. V. Sindhu; Aakarshi Kashyap; Gayatri Gopichand; Treesa Jolly; Ashwini Ponnappa	Singapore; Loh Kean Yew; Jason Teh; Terry Hee; Tan Wei Han; Loh Kean Hean; Andy Kwek; Yeo Jia Min; Jin Yujia; Crystal Wong; Nur Insyirah Khan
