= 2006 Badminton Asia Thomas & Uber Cup Preliminaries =

Tournament details
- Dates: 13–19 February 2006
- Venue: Sawai Mansingh Stadium Badminton Hall
- Location: Jaipur, India

The 2006 Badminton Asia Thomas & Uber Cup Preliminaries were the Asian qualifiers for the 2006 Thomas & Uber Cup in Sendai, Tokyo. The tournament was held at the Sawai Mansingh Stadium Badminton Hall in Jaipur, India.

== Tournament ==
The 2006 Badminton Asia Thomas & Uber Cup Preliminaries serve as the Asian qualification event towards the 2006 Thomas & Uber Cup in Sendai and Tokyo, Japan.

=== Venue ===
The tournament was held at the Sawai Mansingh Stadium Badminton Hall in Jaipur, India.

=== Draw ===
- Men's team

Group A	Group B	Group C	Group D
Iran; Malaysia; Nepal; Pakistan	Indonesia; Thailand; Vietnam	Hong Kong; India; Singapore	Chinese Taipei; South Korea; Sri Lanka

- Women's team

Group X	Group Y
Chinese Taipei; Indonesia; Iran; South Korea; Malaysia	Hong Kong; India; Pakistan; Singapore; Thailand

== Squads ==
Men's team
Team	Players
Chinese Taipei	Chien Yu-hsiu, Liao Sheng-shiun, Chen Chih-hao, Chang Jeng-shyuang, Tsai Chia-hsin, Tseng Chung-lin, Huang Shih-chung, Chien Yu-hsun, Lee Wei-jen, Hu Chung-shien
Hong Kong	Ng Wei, Agus Hariyanto, Yohan Hadikusumo Wiratama, Albertus Susanto Njoto, Hung Yuk Wong, Tam Lok Tin, Lam Hoi Tak, Liu Kwok Wa, Zheng Yumin
India	Abhinn Shyam Gupta, Chetan Anand, Arvind Bhat, Anup Sridhar, Sanave Thomas, Valiyaveetil Diju, Rupesh Kumar, Jaseel P. Ismail, Marcos Bristow
Indonesia	Taufik Hidayat, Sony Dwi Kuncoro, Simon Santoso, Markus Wijanu, Luluk Hadiyanto, Alvent Yulianto, Markis Kido, Hendra Aprida Gunawan, Candra Wijaya
Iran	Kaveh Mehrabi, Ali Shahhosseini, Abdul Mohamadian Arash, Golam Reza Bagheri, Jalal Eskandare, Shiri Nikzad
Malaysia	Wong Choong Hann, Muhammad Hafiz Hashim, Lee Chong Wei, Kuan Beng Hong, Choong Tan Fook, Chan Chong Ming, Mohd Fairuzizuan Mohd Tazari, Lin Woon Fui, Koo Kien Keat
Nepal	Ram Singh Chaudhari, Indra Mahata, Pashupati Paneru, Balaram Thapa
Pakistan	Wajid Ali Chaudhry, Omar Zeeshan, Ahsan Qamar, Rizwan Azam, Mohammad Atique, Mirza Ali Yar Beg, Rizwan Asghar Rana
Singapore	Kendrick Lee, Gerald Ho, Philip Phua, Aaron Tan, Chew Swee Hau, Denny Setiawan, Donny Prasetyo
Sri Lanka	Niluka Karunaratne, Dinuka Karunaratne, U. D. R. P. Kumara, Niroshan John, Thushara Edirisinghe, Chameera Kumarapperuma, Duminda Jayakody
South Korea	Lee Hyun-il, Park Tae-sang, Park Sung-hwan, Lee Cheol-ho, Lee Yong-dae, Jung Jae-sung, Lee Jae-jin, Han Sang-hoon
Thailand	Boonsak Ponsana, Anuphap Theeraratsakul, Poompat Sapkulchananart, Peerasak Wirayapadongpong, Songphon Anugritayawon, Nitipong Saengsila, Sudket Prapakamol, Patapol Ngernsrisuk
Vietnam	Nguyễn Anh Quốc, Trần Thanh Hải, Nguyễn Tiến Minh, Nguyễn Quang Minh, Nguyễn Hoàng Hải
Women's team
Team	Players
Chinese Taipei	Cheng Shao-chieh, Chien Yu-chin, Huang Chia-hsin, Cheng Wen-hsing, Chou Chia-chi, Ku Pei-ting
Hong Kong	Wang Chen, Yip Pui Yin, Wong Sin Yee, Louisa Koon, Ng Ka Shun, Li Wing Mui
India	Aparna Popat, B. R. Meenakshi, Trupti Murgunde, Shruti Kurien, Fathima Nazneen, Jwala Gutta, Saina Nehwal, Manjusha Kanwar
Indonesia	Fransisca Ratnasari, Maria Kristin Yulianti, Adriyanti Firdasari, Wiwis Meilyanna, Jo Novita, Greysia Polii, Lita Nurlita, Rani Mundiasti, Natalia Christine Poluakan, Liliyana Natsir
Iran	Nakisa Sultani, Negin Amiripour, Behnaz Pirzamanbein, Samira Zorra
Malaysia	Wong Mew Choo, Julia Wong Pei Xian, Norshahliza Baharum, Anita Raj Kaur, Chin Eei Hui, Wong Pei Tty, Fong Chew Yen, Ooi Sock Ai, Mooi Hing Yau, See Phui Leng
Pakistan	Aisha Akram, Asma Butt, Uzma Butt, Sara Khan, Saima Manzoor, Farzana Saleem, Farzana Shaheen, Zahida Ali
Singapore	Li Li, Xing Aiying, Frances Liu, Shinta Mulia Sari, Jiang Yanmei, Li Yujia
South Korea	Seo Yoon-hee, Hwang Hye-youn, Jang Soo-young, Lee Yun-hwa, Lee Kyung-won, Lee Hyo-jung, Ha Jung-eun, Kim Min-jung, Hwang Yu-mi
Thailand	Salakjit Ponsana, Soratja Chansrisukot, Sujitra Ekmongkolpaisarn, Molthila Meemeak, Sathinee Chankrachangwong, Saralee Thungthongkam, Duanganong Aroonkesorn, Kunchala Voravichitchaikul

== Men's team ==
=== Group stage ===
==== Group A ====
Pos	Team	Pld	W	L	MF	MA	MD	Pts	Qualification	Malaysia	Pakistan	Iran	Nepal
1	Malaysia	3	3	0	15	0	+15	3	Advance to knockout stage	—	5–0	5–0	5–0
2	Pakistan	3	2	1	8	7	+1	2	Advance to classification round		—	3–2	5–0
3	Iran	3	1	2	6	9	−3	1				—	4–1
4	Nepal	3	0	3	1	14	−13	0					—

Source: Badminton Asia

==== Group B ====
Pos	Team	Pld	W	L	MF	MA	MD	Pts	Qualification	Indonesia	Thailand	Vietnam
1	Indonesia	2	2	0	8	2	+6	2	Advance to knockout stage	—	3–2	5–0
2	Thailand	2	1	1	7	3	+4	1	Advance to classification round		—	5–0
3	Vietnam	2	0	2	0	10	−10	0				—

Source: Badminton Asia

==== Group C ====
Pos	Team	Pld	W	L	MF	MA	MD	Pts	Qualification	India	Hong Kong	Singapore
1	India	2	2	0	7	3	+4	2	Advance to knockout stage	—	3–2	4–1
2	Hong Kong	2	1	1	7	3	+4	1	Advance to classification round		—	5–0
3	Singapore	2	0	2	1	9	−8	0				—

Source: Badminton Asia

==== Group D ====
Pos	Team	Pld	W	L	MF	MA	MD	Pts	Qualification	South Korea	Chinese Taipei for Olympic games	Sri Lanka
1	South Korea	2	2	0	10	5	+5	2	Advance to knockout stage	—	5–0	5–0
2	Chinese Taipei	2	1	1	5	5	0	1	Advance to classification round		—	5–0
3	Sri Lanka	2	0	2	0	10	−10	0				—

Source: Badminton Asia

=== 5th to 8th place classification ===
7th place
A2	Pakistan	0
B2	Thailand	3
C2	Hong Kong	0
D2	Chinese Taipei	3

5th place
B2	Thailand	3
D2	Chinese Taipei	1

=== Knockout stage ===
Semi-finals
A1	Malaysia	3
B1	Indonesia	2
C1	India	0
D1	South Korea	3

Final
D1	Malaysia	3
B1	South Korea	2
Third place
A1	Indonesia	3
C1	India	1

==== Semi-finals ====
Indonesia
2
Sawai Mansingh Stadium Badminton Hall
18 February 2006

Malaysia
3

			1	2	3
1	(Indonesia) (Malaysia)	Taufik Hidayat; Lee Chong Wei	13; 21	19; 21
2	(Indonesia) (Malaysia)	Luluk Hadiyanto / Alvent Yulianto; Chan Chong Ming / Koo Kien Keat	21; 16	14; 21	21; 16
3	(Indonesia) (Malaysia)	Sony Dwi Kuncoro; Muhammad Hafiz Hashim	10; 21	9; 21
4	(Indonesia) (Malaysia)	Markis Kido / Hendra Setiawan; Lin Woon Fui / Mohd Fairuzizuan Mohd Tazari	21; 13	21; 17
5	(Indonesia) (Malaysia)	Simon Santoso; Kuan Beng Hong	22; 24	21; 14	17; 21

South Korea
3
Sawai Mansingh Stadium Badminton Hall
18 February 2006

India
0

			1	2	3
1	(South Korea) (India)	Lee Hyun-il; Chetan Anand	21; 13	21; 10
2	(South Korea) (India)	Han Sang-hoon / Lee Jae-jin; Rupesh Kumar K. T. / Sanave Thomas	21; 17	21; 12
3	(South Korea) (India)	Shon Seung-mo; Anup Sridhar	22; 24	27; 25	21; 10
4	(South Korea) (India)	Jung Jae-sung / Lee Yong-dae; Valiyaveetil Diju / Jaseel P. Ismail				not played
5	(South Korea) (India)	Park Sung-hwan; Nikhil Kanetkar				not played

==== Third place ====
Indonesia
3
Sawai Mansingh Stadium Badminton Hall
19 February 2006

India
1

			1	2	3
1	(Indonesia) (India)	Sony Dwi Kuncoro; Chetan Anand	21; 13	21; 18
2	(Indonesia) (India)	Luluk Hadiyanto / Alvent Yulianto; Rupesh Kumar K. T. / Sanave Thomas	21; 12	21; 11
3	(Indonesia) (India)	Simon Santoso; Arvind Bhat	13; 21	15; 21
4	(Indonesia) (India)	Markis Kido / Hendra Setiawan; Valiyaveetil Diju / Jaseel P. Ismail	21; 6	22; 20
5	(Indonesia) (India)	Markus Wijanu; Anup Sridhar				not played

==== Final ====
South Korea
2
Sawai Mansingh Stadium Badminton Hall
19 February 2006

Malaysia
3

			1	2	3
1	(South Korea) (Malaysia)	Lee Hyun-il; Lee Chong Wei	10; 21	17; 21
2	(South Korea) (Malaysia)	Han Sang-hoon / Lee Jae-jin; Chan Chong Ming / Koo Kien Keat	22; 20	21; 19
3	(South Korea) (Malaysia)	Park Sung-hwan; Muhammad Hafiz Hashim	23; 21	21; 23	7; 21
4	(South Korea) (Malaysia)	Jung Jae-sung / Lee Yong-dae; Lin Woon Fui / Mohd Fairuzizuan Mohd Tazari	17; 21	21; 13	21; 15
5	(South Korea) (Malaysia)	Lee Cheol-ho; Kuan Beng Hong	15; 21	12; 21

=== Qualified teams ===
- Malaysia (24th appearance)
- South Korea (12th appearance)
- Indonesia (21st appearance)
- India (7th appearance)

== Women's team ==
=== Group stage ===
==== Group X ====
Pos	Team	Pld	W	L	MF	MA	MD	Pts	Qualification	South Korea	Chinese Taipei for Olympic games	Malaysia	Indonesia	Iran
1	South Korea	4	4	0	17	3	+14	4	Advance to knockout stage	—	3–2	4–1	5–0	5–0
2	Chinese Taipei	4	2	2	12	8	+4	2	Advance to knockout stage		—	3–2	2–3	5–0
3	Malaysia	4	2	2	11	9	+2	2	Advance to classification round			—	3–2	5–0
4	Indonesia	4	2	2	10	10	0	2					—	5–0
5	Iran	4	0	4	0	20	−20	0						—

Source: Badminton Asia

==== Group Y ====
Pos	Team	Pld	W	L	MF	MA	MD	Pts	Qualification	Hong Kong	Singapore	India	Thailand	Pakistan
1	Hong Kong	4	4	0	16	4	+12	4	Advance to knockout stage	—	3–2	3–2	5–0	5–0
2	Singapore	4	3	1	15	5	+10	3	Advance to knockout stage		—	5–0	3–2	5–0
3	India	4	2	2	10	10	0	2	Advance to classification round			—	3–2	5–0
4	Thailand	4	1	3	9	11	−2	1					—	5–0
5	Pakistan	4	0	4	0	20	−20	0						—

Source: Badminton Asia

=== 5th place classification ===
5th place
X3	Malaysia	3
Y3	India	2

=== Knockout stage ===
Semi-finals
X1	South Korea	3
Y2	Singapore	0
Y1	Hong Kong	1
X2	Chinese Taipei	3

Final
Y2	South Korea	3
Y1	Chinese Taipei	0
Third place
Y2	Singapore	3
Y1	Hong Kong	0

==== Semi-finals ====
South Korea
3
Sawai Mansingh Stadium Badminton Hall
18 February 2006

Singapore
1

			1	2	3
1	(South Korea) (Singapore)	Seo Yoon-hee; Li Li	16; 21	12; 21
2	(South Korea) (Singapore)	Lee Yun-hwa; Xing Aiying	22; 20	21; 15
3	(South Korea) (Singapore)	Lee Hyo-jung / Lee Kyung-won; Jiang Yanjiao / Li Yujia	21; 14	21; 17
4	(South Korea) (Singapore)	Jun Jae-youn; Frances Liu	21; 10	21; 16
5	(South Korea) (Singapore)	Ha Jung-eun / Hwang Yu-mi; Frances Liu / Shinta Mulia Sari				not played

Chinese Taipei
3
Sawai Mansingh Stadium Badminton Hall
18 February 2006

Hong Kong
1

			1	2	3
1	(Chinese Taipei) (Hong Kong)	Cheng Shao-chieh; Wang Chen	19; 21	19; 21
2	(Chinese Taipei) (Hong Kong)	Huang Chia-hsin; Wong Sin Yee	21; 18	21; 15
3	(Chinese Taipei) (Hong Kong)	Cheng Wen-hsing / Chien Yu-chin; Koon Wai Chee / Li Wing Mui	21; 13	21; 17
4	(Chinese Taipei) (Hong Kong)	Chiu Yi-ju; Ng Ka Shun	21; 19	16; 21	21; 19
5	(Chinese Taipei) (Hong Kong)	Chou Chia-chi / Ku Pei-ting; Ng Ka Shun / Yip Pui Yin				not played

==== Third place ====
Hong Kong
0
Sawai Mansingh Stadium Badminton Hall
19 February 2006

Singapore
3

			1	2	3
1	(Hong Kong) (Singapore)	Wong Sin Yee; Li Li	13; 21	16; 21
2	(Hong Kong) (Singapore)	Ng Ka Shun; Xing Aiying	17; 21	21; 16	11; 21
3	(Hong Kong) (Singapore)	Chau Hoi Wah; Shinta Mulia Sari	19; 21	17; 21
4	(Hong Kong) (Singapore)	Koon Wai Chee / Li Wing Mui; Jiang Yanjiao / Li Yujia				not played
5	(Hong Kong) (Singapore)	Ng Ka Shun / Yip Pui Yin; Frances Liu / Shinta Mulia Sari				not played

==== Final ====
South Korea
3
Sawai Mansingh Stadium Badminton Hall
19 February 2006

Chinese Taipei
0

			1	2	3
1	(South Korea) (Chinese Taipei)	Seo Yoon-hee; Huang Chia-hsin	21; 13	21; 13
2	(South Korea) (Chinese Taipei)	Ha Jung-eun / Lee Kyung-won; Cheng Wen-hsing / Chien Yu-chin	21; 17	29; 27
3	(South Korea) (Chinese Taipei)	Lee Yun-hwa; Chiu Yi-ju	21; 8	21; 14
4	(South Korea) (Chinese Taipei)	Hwang Yu-mi / Lee Hyo-jung; Chou Chia-chi / Ku Pei-ting				not played
5	(South Korea) (Chinese Taipei)	Jun Jae-youn; Pai Min-jie				not played

=== Qualified teams ===
- South Korea (12th appearance)
- Chinese Taipei (2nd appearance)
- Singapore (Debut)
- Hong Kong (4th appearance)
