= Chandrika de Silva =

Sri Lankan badminton player

Personal information
- Born: 24 February 1974 (age 52)
- Height: 1.62 m (5 ft 4 in)

Sport
- Country: Sri Lanka
- Sport: Badminton
- Handedness: Right

Women's singles & doubles
- Highest ranking: 129 (WS 19 April 2012); 164 (WD 19 January 2012); 116 (XD 31 May 2012)
- BWF profile
Medal record
Women's badminton
Representing Sri Lanka
World Senior Championships
Silver medal – second place	2025 Pattaya	Women's singles 50+
South Asian Games
Silver medal – second place	2004 Islamabad	Women's team
Silver medal – second place	2006 Colombo	Women's team
Silver medal – second place	2010 Dhaka	Women's team
Silver medal – second place	2016 Guwahati–Shillong	Women's team
Bronze medal – third place	2004 Islamabad	Women's singles
Bronze medal – third place	2004 Islamabad	Women's doubles
Bronze medal – third place	2004 Islamabad	Mixed doubles
Bronze medal – third place	2006 Colombo	Women's singles
Bronze medal – third place	2006 Colombo	Women's doubles
Bronze medal – third place	2006 Colombo	Mixed doubles
Bronze medal – third place	2010 Dhaka	Women's doubles
Bronze medal – third place	2010 Dhaka	Mixed doubles

Chandrika de Silva (Sinhalese: චන්ද්‍රිකා ද සිල්වා; Tamils: சந்திரிகா த சில்வா; born 24 February 1974) also known as Renu Chandrika Hettiarachchige is a Sri Lankan badminton player. She represented her country at the 2002, 2006 and 2010 Commonwealth Games.

== Career ==
She won the Sri Lanka national championships in 1997 to 2003 and regained the title back in 2005. In 2004, she won one silver and three bronze medals at the 2004 South Asian Games. At the 2005 Nepal Satellite she clinched the women's singles and mixed doubles event, and at the same year, she reached the women's doubles quarterfinals at the Asian Championships. She also won the women's and mixed doubles titles in Syria and Jordan.

== Achievements ==
=== World Senior Championships ===
Women's singles

Year	Age	Venue	Opponent	Score	Result	Ref
2025	50+	Eastern National Sports Training Centre, Pattaya, Thailand	(Denmark) Janne Vang Nielsen	19–21, 21–23	Silver	

=== South Asian Games ===
Women's singles
Year	Venue	Opponent	Score	Result
2004	Rodham Hall; Islamabad, Pakistan	(India) B. R. Meenakshi	8–11, 1–11	Bronze
2006	Sugathadasa Indoor Stadium; Colombo, Sri Lanka	(India) Trupti Murgunde	11–21, 10–21	Bronze

Women's doubles
Year	Venue	Partner	Opponent	Score	Result
2004	Rodham Hall; Islamabad, Pakistan	(Sri Lanka) Pameesha Dishanthi	(India) Fathima Nazneen (India) Manjusha Kanwar	3–15, 4–15	Bronze
2006	Sugathadasa Indoor Stadium; Colombo, Sri Lanka	(Sri Lanka) Thilini Jayasinghe	(India) Aparna Balan (India) B. R. Meenakshi	7–21, 14–21	Bronze
2010	Wooden-Floor Gymnasium; Dhaka, Bangladesh	(Sri Lanka) Nadeesha Gayanthi	(India) P. C. Thulasi (India) Ashwini Ponnappa	8–21, 13–21	Bronze

Mixed doubles
Year	Venue	Partner	Opponent	Score	Result
2004	Rodham Hall; Islamabad, Pakistan	(Sri Lanka) Thushara Edirisinghe	(India) Markose Bristow (India) Manjusha Kanwar	5–15, 17–15, 10–15	Bronze
2006	Sugathadasa Indoor Stadium; Colombo, Sri Lanka	(Sri Lanka) Thushara Edirisinghe	(India) Thomas Kurian (India) Aparna Balan	12–21, 9–21	Bronze
2010	Wooden-Floor Gymnasium; Dhaka, Bangladesh	(Sri Lanka) Niluka Karunaratne	(India) Sanave Thomas (India) Aparna Balan	14–21, 13–21	Bronze

=== BWF International Challenge/Series (7 titles, 7 runners-up) ===
Women's singles
Year	Tournament	Opponent	Score	Result
2002	Bangladesh Satellite	(Bangladesh) Alina Begum	11–2, 11–1	(gold) Winner
2005	Nepal Satellite	(Sri Lanka) Thilini Jayasinghe	11–5, 11–9	(gold) Winner
2007	Iran Fajr International	(Portugal) Ana Moura	16–21, 21–15, 18–21	(silver) Runner-up

Women's doubles
Year	Tournament	Partner	Opponent	Score	Result
2007	Iran Fajr International	(Sri Lanka) Thilini Jayasinghe	(Iran) Negin Amiripour (Iran) Sahar Zamanian	20–22, 21–13, 12–21	(silver) Runner-up
2007	Syria International	(Sri Lanka) Thilini Jayasinghe	(Iran) Sabereh Kabiri (Iran) Sahar Zamanian	21–13, 21–18	(gold) Winner
2007	Jordan Satellite	(Sri Lanka) Thilini Jayasinghe	(Iran) Sabereh Kabiri (Iran) Sahar Zamanian	21–19, 21–17	(gold) Winner
2007	Pakistan International	(Sri Lanka) Thilini Jayasinghe	(India) Jwala Gutta (India) Shruti Kurien	13–21, 14–21	(silver) Runner-up
2008	Iran Fajr International	(Sri Lanka) Thilini Jayasinghe	(Malaysia) Norshahliza Baharum (Malaysia) Lim Yin Loo	12–21, 15–21	(silver) Runner-up

Mixed doubles
Year	Tournament	Partner	Opponent	Score	Result
2005	Nepal Satellite	(Sri Lanka) Thushara Edirisinghe	(Sri Lanka) Duminda Jayakody (Sri Lanka) Thilini Jayasinghe	15–13, 15–4	(gold) Winner
2007	Jordan Satellite	(Sri Lanka) Diluka Karunaratne	(Sri Lanka) Anushaka Lakshan (Sri Lanka) Thilini Jayasinghe	21–15, 23–21	(gold) Winner
2007	Pakistan International	(Sri Lanka) Diluka Karunaratne	(India) Valiyaveetil Diju (India) Aparna Balan	11–21, 14–21	(silver) Runner-up
2010	Maldives International	(Sri Lanka) Udara Nayanajith	(Philippines) Kennevic Asuncion (United States) Karyn Velez	22–24, 21–17, 13–21	(silver) Runner-up
2010	Syria International	(Sri Lanka) Lasitha Menaka	(Turkey) Emre Vural (Turkey) Özge Bayrak	21–17, 21–19	(gold) Winner
2011	Miami International	(Sri Lanka) Lasitha Menaka	(United States) Phillip Chew (United States) Paula Lynn Obañana	18–21, 21–17, 10–21	(silver) Runner-up

BWF International Challenge tournament
BWF International Series tournament
BWF Future Series tournament
