= India International Challenge =

Badminton tournament

- Sport: Badminton
- Founded: 2007
- Organizing body: Badminton Association of India
- Country: India

The India International Challenge is an international badminton tournament, which is held annually in India. During its first two editions, it was a domestic tournament. Since 2010, it became an international tournament with the grading of International Challenge.

== Locations ==
Locations of India International host cities

Below is the cities that have hosted the tournament.

- Mumbai: 2018–2019
- Bengaluru: 2021–2023, 2026
- Nagpur: 2022
- Raipur: 2022–2024
- Hyderabad: 2024–2026
- Mangaluru: 2025

== Previous winners ==
Year	Men's singles	Women's singles	Men's doubles	Women's doubles	Mixed doubles	Ref
2007	(Malaysia) Chong Wei Feng	(Japan) Kanako Yonekura	(Malaysia) Chang Hun Pin (Malaysia) Chan Peng Soon	(India) Jwala Gutta (India) Shruti Kurien	(India) Valiyaveetil Diju (India) Jwala Gutta	
2008	(India) Arvind Bhat	(India) B. R. Meenakshi	(India) Rupesh Kumar (India) Sanave Thomas	(India) Jwala Gutta (India) Shruti Kurien	(India) Valiyaveetil Diju (India) Jwala Gutta	
2009	(India) Chetan Anand	(India) Sayali Gokhale	(India) Rupesh Kumar (India) Sanave Thomas	(India) Aparna Balan (India) Shruti Kurien	(India) Arun Vishnu (India) Aparna Balan	
2010	(Indonesia) Alamsyah Yunus	(India) P. C. Thulasi	(Indonesia) Joko Riyadi (Indonesia) Yoga Ukikasah	(Thailand) Savitree Amitrapai (Thailand) Nessara Somsri	(Thailand) Savitree Amitrapai (Thailand) Patiphat Chalardchaleam	
2011	(Indonesia) Alamsyah Yunus	(India) P. V. Sindhu	(India) Pranav Chopra (India) Akshay Dewalkar	(Indonesia) Della Destiara Haris (Indonesia) Suci Rizky Andini	(Indonesia) Fran Kurniawan (Indonesia) Shendy Puspa Irawati	
2012	(India) Gurusai Dutt	(India) P. C. Thulasi	(South Korea) Ko Sung-hyun (South Korea) Lee Yong-dae	(South Korea) Lee So-hee (South Korea) Shin Seung-chan	(Indonesia) Irfan Fadhilah (Indonesia) Weni Anggraini	
2013	(India) Sourabh Varma	(Indonesia) Febby Angguni	(India) Manu Attri (India) B. Sumeeth Reddy	(India) Pradnya Gadre (India) N. Sikki Reddy	(India) Pradnya Gadre (India) Akshay Dewalkar	
2014	(India) Prannoy H. S.	(India) Ruthvika Gadde	(India) Manu Attri (India) B. Sumeeth Reddy	(India) Aparna Balan (India) Prajakta Sawant	(India) Manu Attri (India) N. Sikki Reddy	
2015	(India) Sameer Verma	(Thailand) Pornpawee Chochuwong	(Thailand) Wannawat Ampunsuwan (Thailand) Tinn Isriyanet	(Thailand) Chayanit Chaladchalam (Thailand) Phataimas Muenwong	(India) Satwiksairaj Rankireddy (India) K. Maneesha	
2016	(Indonesia) Enzi Shafira	(Malaysia) Soniia Cheah	(India) Satwiksairaj Rankireddy (India) Chirag Shetty	(Indonesia) Mychelle Crhystine Bandaso (Indonesia) Serena Kani	(Indonesia) Fachriza Abimanyu (Indonesia) Bunga Fitriani Romadhini	
2017	(Thailand) Sitthikom Thammasin	(India) Ruthvika Gadde	(Thailand) Maneepong Jongjit (Thailand) Nanthakarn Yordphaisong	(Hong Kong) Ng Tsz Yau (Hong Kong) Yeung Nga Ting	(Hong Kong) Mak Hee Chun (Hong Kong) Yeung Nga Ting	
2018	(India) Lakshya Sen	(India) Ashmita Chaliha	(India) Arjun M. R. (India) B. Sumeeth Reddy	(Hong Kong) Ng Wing Yung (Hong Kong) Yeung Nga Ting	(Thailand) Nipitphon Phuangphuapet (Thailand) Savitree Amitrapai	
2019	(Canada) Xiaodong Sheng	(Thailand) Porntip Buranaprasertsuk	(India) Manu Attri (India) B. Sumeeth Reddy	(Malaysia) Pearly Tan (Malaysia) Thinaah Muralitharan	(Malaysia) Hoo Pang Ron (Malaysia) Cheah Yee See	
2020	Cancelled (Note: This tournament, originally to be played from 10 to 15 November, was later cancelled due to the COVID-19 pandemic in India.)					
2021	(India) Priyanshu Rajawat	(India) Anupama Upadhyaya	(India) Krishna Prasad Garaga (India) Vishnuvardhan Goud Panjala	(India) Treesa Jolly (India) Gayatri Gopichand	(India) Ishaan Bhatnagar (India) Tanisha Crasto	
2022 I	(India) Meiraba Maisnam	(Japan) Miho Kayama	(India) Arjun M. R. (India) Dhruv Kapila	(Japan) Chisato Hoshi (Japan) Miyu Takahashi	(Thailand) Ruttanapak Oupthong (Thailand) Jhenicha Sudjaipraparat	
2022 II	(India) Priyanshu Rajawat	(India) Tasnim Mir	(India) Ishaan Bhatnagar (India) Sai Pratheek K.	(Japan) Chisato Hoshi (Japan) Miyu Takahashi	(India) Rohan Kapoor (India) N. Sikki Reddy	
2022 III	(India) Sourabh Verma	(India) Tanya Hemanth	(Thailand) Chaloempon Charoenkitamorn (Thailand) Nanthakarn Yordphaisong	(India) Ashwini Bhat (India) Shikha Gautam	(India) Sai Pratheek K. (India) Ashwini Ponnappa	
2023 I	(India) Sathish Karunakaran	(India) Isharani Baruah	(India) Hariharan Amsakarunan (India) Ruban Kumar	(Japan) Miku Shigeta (Japan) Maya Taguchi	(Thailand) Phatharathorn Nipornram (Thailand) Nattamon Laisuan	
2023 II	(India) Sathish Karunakaran	(India) Unnati Hooda	(Thailand) Chaloempon Charoenkitamorn (Thailand) Thanawin Madee	(Thailand) Tidapron Kleebyeesun (Thailand) Nattamon Laisuan	(India) Sathish Karunakaran (India) Aadya Variyath	
2024 I	(India) Rithvik Sanjeevi	(India) Isharani Baruah	(India) Pruthvi Roy (India) Sai Pratheek K.	(India) Priya Konjengbam (India) Shruti Mishra	(India) Rohan Kapoor (India) Ruthvika Gadde	
2024 II	(India) Mithun Manjunath	(India) Rakshitha Ramraj	(India) Hariharan Amsakarunan (India) Ruban Kumar	(India) Arathi Sara Sunil (India) Varshini Viswanath Sri	(India) Rohan Kapoor (India) Ruthvika Gadde	
2025 I	(India) Rithvik Sanjeevi	(India) Mansi Singh	(Singapore) Wesley Koh (Singapore) Junsuke Kubo	(Thailand) Hathaithip Mijad (Thailand) Napapakorn Tungkasatan	(India) Dhruv Rawat (India) K. Maneesha	
2025 II	(India) Ginpaul Sonna	(India) Mansi Singh	(India) Hariharan Amsakarunan (India) Arjun M.R.	(Thailand) Hathaithip Mijad (Thailand) Napapakorn Tungkasatan	(India) Sathwik Reddy Kanapuram (India) Reshika Uthayasooriyan	
2026 I	(India) Sathish Karunakaran	(Thailand) Yataweemin Ketklieng	(India) Sai Pratheek K. (India) Ruban Kumar	(Japan) Mei Sudo (Japan) Mai Tanabe	(Individual Neutral Athletes) Rodion Alimov (Individual Neutral Athletes) Alina Davletova	
2026 II	(India) Tushar Suveer	(India) Rakshitha Ramraj	(India) Krishna Prasad Garaga (India) Pruthvi Roy	(Japan) Mei Sudo (Japan) Mai Tanabe	(Individual Neutral Athletes) Rodion Alimov (Individual Neutral Athletes) Alina Davletova	

== Performance by nation ==
As of the 2026 II edition

Pos.	Nation	MS	WS	MD	WD	XD	Total
1	India*	19	18	17	9	14	77
2	Thailand	1	3	4	5	4	17
3	Indonesia	3	1	1	2	3	10
4	Japan		2		5		7
5	Malaysia	1	1	1	1	1	5
6	Hong Kong				2	1	3
7	(Individual Neutral Athletes) Authorised Neutral Athletes					2	2
7	South Korea			1	1		2
9	Canada	1					1
9	Singapore			1			1
Total		25	25	25	25	25	125

* Host nation

== See also ==
- India Open
- Syed Modi International Badminton Championships
- Hyderabad Open (Defunct)
- Odisha Masters
- Guwahati Masters
