= 2009 Australian Open Grand Prix =

Tournament details
- Dates: 22–26 July 2009
- Level: Grand Prix
- Total prize money: US$50,000
- Venue: Melbourne Sports and Aquatic Centre
- Location: Melbourne, Australia

Champions
- Men's singles: (Indonesia) Dionysius Hayom Rumbaka
- Women's singles: (Indonesia) Maria Febe Kusumastuti
- Men's doubles: (Malaysia) Gan Teik Chai (Malaysia) Tan Bin Shen
- Women's doubles: (Australia) Huang Chia-chi (Australia) He Tian Tang
- Mixed doubles: (Hong Kong) Yohan Hadikusumo Wiratama (Hong Kong) Chau Hoi Wah

The 2009 Australian Open Grand Prix was a badminton tournament which took place at the Melbourne Sports and Aquatic Centre in Melbourne, Australia on 22–26 July 2009 and had a total purse of $50,000.

== Men's singles ==
=== Seeds ===
1. (Hong Kong) Chan Yan Kit (semifinals)
2. (Indonesia) Andre Kurniawan Tedjono (second round)
3. (Malaysia) Lee Tsuen Seng (second round)
4. (England) Andrew Smith (third round)
5. (France) Brice Leverdez (quarterfinals)
6. (India) Anup Sridhar (quarterfinals)
7. (India) Anand Pawar (second round)
8. (France) Matthieu Lo Ying Ping (quarterfinals)

=== Finals ===
Quarterfinals
1	(Hong Kong) Chan Yan Kit	21	21
6	(India) Anup Sridhar	17	18
(Indonesia) Dionysius Hayom Rumbaka	21	13	21
8	(France) Matthieu Lo Ying Ping	19	21	17
(Indonesia) Alamsyah Yunus	21	21
(India) Aditya Prakash	13	9
5	(France) Brice Leverdez	18	19
(Indonesia) Andreas Adityawarman	21	21

Semifinals
1	(Hong Kong) Chan Yan Kit	21	13	19
(Indonesia) Dionysius Hayom Rumbaka	16	21	21
(Indonesia) Alamsyah Yunus	21	21
(Indonesia) Andreas Adityawarman	18	17

Final
(Indonesia) Dionysius Hayom Rumbaka	21	21
(Indonesia) Alamsyah Yunus	17	18

== Women's singles ==
=== Seeds ===
1. (Hong Kong) Yip Pui Yin (final)
2. (Indonesia) Maria Febe Kusumastuti (champion)
3. (Czech Republic) Kristína Ludíková (semifinals)
4. (Malaysia) Anita Raj Kaur (semifinals)
5. (India) Neha Pandit (quarterfinals)
6. (New Zealand) Michelle Chan (first round)
7. (Mauritius) Karen Foo Kune (withdrew)
8. (Vietnam) Lê Ngọc Nguyên Nhung (first round)

=== Finals ===
Semifinals
1	(Hong Kong) Yip Pui Yin	21	19	21
3	(Czech Republic) Kristína Ludíková	15	21	17
4	(Malaysia) Anita Raj Kaur	12	9
2	(Indonesia) Maria Febe Kusumastuti	21	21

Final
1	(Hong Kong) Yip Pui Yin	18	19
2	(Indonesia) Maria Febe Kusumastuti	21	21

== Men's doubles ==
=== Seeds ===
1. (India) Rupesh Kumar K. T. / Sanave Thomas (final)
2. (Malaysia) Gan Teik Chai / Tan Bin Shen (champion)
3. (India) Akshay Dewalkar / Jishnu Sanyal (semifinals)
4. (India) Tarun Kona / Arun Vishnu (semifinals)

=== Finals ===
Semifinals
1	(India) Rupesh Kumar K. T. (India) Sanave Thomas	21	21
4	(India) Tarun Kona (India) Arun Vishnu	14	13
3	(India) Akshay Dewalkar (India) Jishnu Sanyal	19	10
2	(Malaysia) Gan Teik Chai (Malaysia) Tan Bin Shen	21	21

Final
1	(India) Rupesh Kumar K. T. (India) Sanave Thomas	13	11
2	(Malaysia) Gan Teik Chai (Malaysia) Tan Bin Shen	21	21

== Women's doubles ==
=== Seeds ===
1. (New Zealand) Danielle Barry / Donna Haliday (semifinals)
2. (Hong Kong) Chan Tsz Ka / Tse Ying Suet (quarterfinals)
3. (India) Aparna Balan / Shruti Kurien (final)
4. (New Zealand) Amanda Brown / Susannah Leydon-Davis (second round)

=== Finals ===
Semifinals
1	(New Zealand) Danielle Barry (New Zealand) Donna Haliday	15	12
3	(India) Aparna Balan (India) Shruti Kurien	21	21
(India) Anjali Kalita (India) Jyotshna Polavarapu	18	21
(Australia) Huang Chia-chi (Australia) He Tian Tang	21	23

Final
3	(India) Aparna Balan (India) Shruti Kurien	13	9
(Australia) Huang Chia-chi (Australia) He Tian Tang	21	21

== Mixed doubles ==
=== Seeds ===
1. (Hong Kong) Yohan Hadikusumo Wiratama / Chau Hoi Wah (champion)
2. (New Zealand) Henry Tam / Donna Haliday (final)
3. (New Zealand) Joe Wu / Danielle Barry (semifinals)
4. (India) Arun Vishnu / Aparna Balan (second round)
5. (New Zealand) Oliver Leydon-Davis / Emma Chapple (quarterfinals)
6. (New Zealand) Luke Charlesworth / Mary O'Connor (first round)
7. (New Zealand) Brock Matheson / Amanda Brown (first round)
8. (New Zealand) Kevin Dennerly-Minturn / Louise McKenzie (first round)

=== Finals ===
Semifinals
1	(Hong Kong) Yohan Hadikusumo Wiratama (Hong Kong) Chau Hoi Wah	21	21
3	(New Zealand) Joe Wu (New Zealand) Danielle Barry	9	7
(Australia) Benjamin Walklate (Australia) Kate Wilson-Smith	23	20	18
2	(New Zealand) Henry Tam (New Zealand) Donna Haliday	21	22	21

Final
1	(Hong Kong) Yohan Hadikusumo Wiratama (Hong Kong) Chau Hoi Wah	21	21
2	(New Zealand) Henry Tam (New Zealand) Donna Haliday	11	5

Preceded by Thailand Open	BWF Grand Prix Gold and Grand Prix; 2010 season	Succeeded by New Zealand Open
