= Badminton at the 2004 South Asian Games =

Badminton championships

2004 South Asian Federation Games
Tournament details
- Dates: 29 March – 7 April
- Edition: 1st
- Venue: Rodham Hall, Islamabad Sports Complex
- Location: Islamabad, Pakistan

The Badminton event at the 2004 South Asian Games was held at Rodham Hall in Islamabad, the capital city of Pakistan from 29 March to 7 April. This was the first time badminton was introduced in the subcontinental games, which included men's and women's singles competitions, as well as men's, women's and mixed doubles competitions and men's and women's team events.

== Medal summary ==
=== Medal table ===
* Host nation (Pakistan)

Rank	Nation	Gold	Silver	Bronze	Total
1	India (IND)	7	5	0	12
2	Sri Lanka (SRI)	0	1	7	8
3	Pakistan (PAK)*	0	1	5	6
Totals (3 entries)		7	7	12	26

=== Medalists ===
Discipline	Gold	Silver	Bronze
Men's singles	(India) Chetan Anand	(India) Abhinn Shyam Gupta	(Sri Lanka) U. D. R. P. Kumara
Men's singles	(India) Chetan Anand	(India) Abhinn Shyam Gupta	(Pakistan) Wajid Ali Chaudhry
Women's singles	(India) Trupti Murgunde	(India) B. R. Meenakshi	(Sri Lanka) Chandrika de Silva
Women's singles	(India) Trupti Murgunde	(India) B. R. Meenakshi	(Sri Lanka) Pameesha Dishanthi
Men's doubles	(India) Rupesh Kumar K. T. (India) Marcos Bristow	(India) Jaseel P. Ismail (India) J. B. S. Vidyadhar	(Sri Lanka) Duminda Jayakody (Sri Lanka) Thushara Edirisinghe
Men's doubles	(India) Rupesh Kumar K. T. (India) Marcos Bristow	(India) Jaseel P. Ismail (India) J. B. S. Vidyadhar	(Pakistan) Rizwan Rana (Pakistan) Omar Zeeshan
Women's doubles	(India) Jwala Gutta (India) Shruti Kurien	(India) Fathima Nazneen (India) Manjusha Kanwar	(Sri Lanka) Renu Hettiarachchige (Sri Lanka) Pameesha Dishanthi
Women's doubles	(India) Jwala Gutta (India) Shruti Kurien	(India) Fathima Nazneen (India) Manjusha Kanwar	(Pakistan) Asma Butt (Pakistan) Uzma Butt
Mixed doubles	(India) Jaseel P. Ismail (India) Jwala Gutta	(India) Marcos Bristow (India) Manjusha Kanwar	(Pakistan) Mirza Ali Yar Beg (Pakistan) Saima Manzoor
Mixed doubles	(India) Jaseel P. Ismail (India) Jwala Gutta	(India) Marcos Bristow (India) Manjusha Kanwar	(Sri Lanka) Thushara Edirisinghe (Sri Lanka) Renu Hettiarachchige
Men's team	India Abhinn Shyam Gupta; Chetan Anand; Rupesh Kumar; Jaseel P. Ismail; J. B. S. Vidyadhar; Utsav Mishra; Marcos Bristow; Hemant Duggal	Pakistan Wajid Ali Chaudhry; Ahsan Qamar; Omar Zeeshan; Rizwan Rana; Mir Tahir Ishaque; Mirza Ali Yar Beg; Waqas Masood; Ashraf Masih	Sri Lanka Niluka Karunaratne; U. D. R. P. Kumara; Chameera Kumarapperuma; Duminda Jayakody; Niroshan John
Women's team	India B. R. Meenakshi; Trupti Murgunde; Krishna Deka Raja; Aparna Balan; Jwala Gutta; Shruti Kurien; Fathima Nazneen; Manjusha Kanwar	Sri Lanka Renu Hettiarachchige; Pameesha Dishanthi; Nadeesha Gayanthi; Kalpana Pasangi; Amali Amarasinghe; Thilini Jayasinghe	Pakistan Asma Butt; Ayesha Akram; Uzma Butt; Farzana Saleem; Saima Manzoor; Farzana Shaheen; Zahida Ali; Sadia Arshad

== Results ==
=== Men's singles ===
Semifinal
(India) Abhinn Shyam Gupta	15	15
(Sri Lanka) U. D. R. P. Kumara	13	7
(Pakistan) Wajid Ali Chaudhry	10	4
(India) Chetan Anand	15	15

Final
(India) Abhinn Shyam Gupta	8	15	13
(India) Chetan Anand	15	10	15

=== Women's singles ===
Semifinal
(India) Trupti Murgunde	11	11
(Sri Lanka) Pamisha Dishanthi	0	1
(Sri Lanka) Renu Hettiarachchige	8	2
(India) B. R. Meenakshi	11	11

Final
(India) Trupti Murgunde	9	11	13
(India) B. R. Meenakshi	11	7	10

=== Men's doubles ===
Semi-finals
(India) Marcos Bristow (India) Rupesh Kumar K. T.	15	15
(Sri Lanka) Thushara Edirisinghe (Sri Lanka) Duminda Jayakody	10	6
(Pakistan) Rizwan Rana (Pakistan) Omar Zeeshan	11	2
(India) Jaseel P. Ismail (India) J. B. S. Vidyadhar	15	15

Final
(India) Marcos Bristow (India) Rupesh Kumar K. T.	15	15
(India) Jaseel P. Ismail (India) J. B. S. Vidyadhar	8	4

=== Women's doubles ===
Semi-finals
(India) Jwala Gutta (India) Shruti Kurien	15	15
(Pakistan) Asma Butt (Pakistan) Uzma Butt	3	1
(Sri Lanka) Pameesha Dishanthi (Sri Lanka) Renu Hettiarachchige	3	4
(India) Manjusha Kanwar (India) Fathima Nazneen	15	15

Final
(India) Jwala Gutta (India) Shruti Kurien	15	15
(India) Manjusha Kanwar (India) Fathima Nazneen	6	3

=== Mixed doubles ===
Semi-finals
(India) Jaseel P. Ismail (India) Jwala Gutta	15	15
(Pakistan) Mirza Ali Yar Beg (Pakistan) Saima Manzoor	4	2
(Sri Lanka) Thushara Edirisinghe (Sri Lanka) Renu Hettiarachchige	5	17	10
(India) Marcos Bristow (India) Manjusha Kanwar	15	15	15

Final
(India) Jaseel P. Ismail (India) Jwala Gutta	15	15
(India) Marcos Bristow (India) Manjusha Kanwar	6	3
