= 2010 India Open Grand Prix Gold =

The 2010 Yonex-Sunrise India Open Grand Prix Gold was a badminton BWF Grand Prix Gold event, which held between June 8–13, 2010 at the Jawaharlal Nehru Stadium (Chennai), India.

== Winners ==
| Men's singles | Women's singles | Men's doubles | Women's doubles | Mixed doubles |
|---|---|---|---|---|
| (Indonesia) Alamsyah Yunus | (India) Saina Nehwal | (Malaysia) Mohd Fairuzizuan Mohd Tazari (Malaysia) Mohd Zakry Abdul Latif | (Singapore) Shinta Mulia Sari (Singapore) Yao Lei | (India) Valiyaveetil Diju (India) Jwala Gutta |

== Finals ==
| Event | Winner | Opponent | Result |
|---|---|---|---|
| MS | (Indonesia) Alamsyah Yunus | (India) R. M. V. Gurusaidutt | 21–13, 21–18 |
| WS | (India) Saina Nehwal | (Malaysia) Wong Mew Choo | 20–22, 21–14, 21–12 |
| MD | (Malaysia) Fairuzizuan Tazari & Zakry Abdul Latif | (India) Rupesh Kumar & Sanave Thomas | 21–12, 22–20 |
| WD | (Singapore) Yao Lei & Shinta Mulia Sari | (India) Jwala Gutta & Ashwini Ponnappa | 21–11, 9–21, 21–15 |
| XD | (India) Valiyaveetil Diju & Jwala Gutta | (Singapore) Chayut Triyachart & Yao Lei | 23–21, 20–22, 21–7 |
