= George Thomas (badminton) =

Indian badminton player

Personal information
- Born: 15 April 1966 (age 60) Kerala, India
- Height: 1.65 m (5 ft 5 in)

Sport
- Country: India
- Sport: Badminton
- Handedness: Left

Doubles
- Current ranking: retired
- BWF profile
Medal record
Representing India
Men's badminton
Commonwealth Games
Silver medal – second place	1998 Kuala Lumpur	Men's team

George Thomas (born 15 April 1966) is an Indian former badminton player from Kerala. He won the National Singles title in 1990 and the doubles title with Jaseel P. Ismail in 1992. He was a member of the Indian team that won a silver medal in the 1998 Commonwealth Games. He was conferred with the Arjuna Award in 2002 for his contribution to Indian Badminton. He was employed with Bharat Petroleum Corporation Limited in the HR Department at Kochi and has now retired from service.

== Achievements ==
=== IBF International ===
Men's doubles
Year	Tournament	Partner	Opponent	Score	Result
1998	Sri Lanka International	(India) Marcos Bristow	(South Korea) Choi Min-ho (South Korea) Jung Sung-gyun	13–15, 12–15	(silver) Runner-up

== Career ==
George began his career by playing for the University of Calicut.
