= Abhinn Shyam Gupta =

Indian badminton player

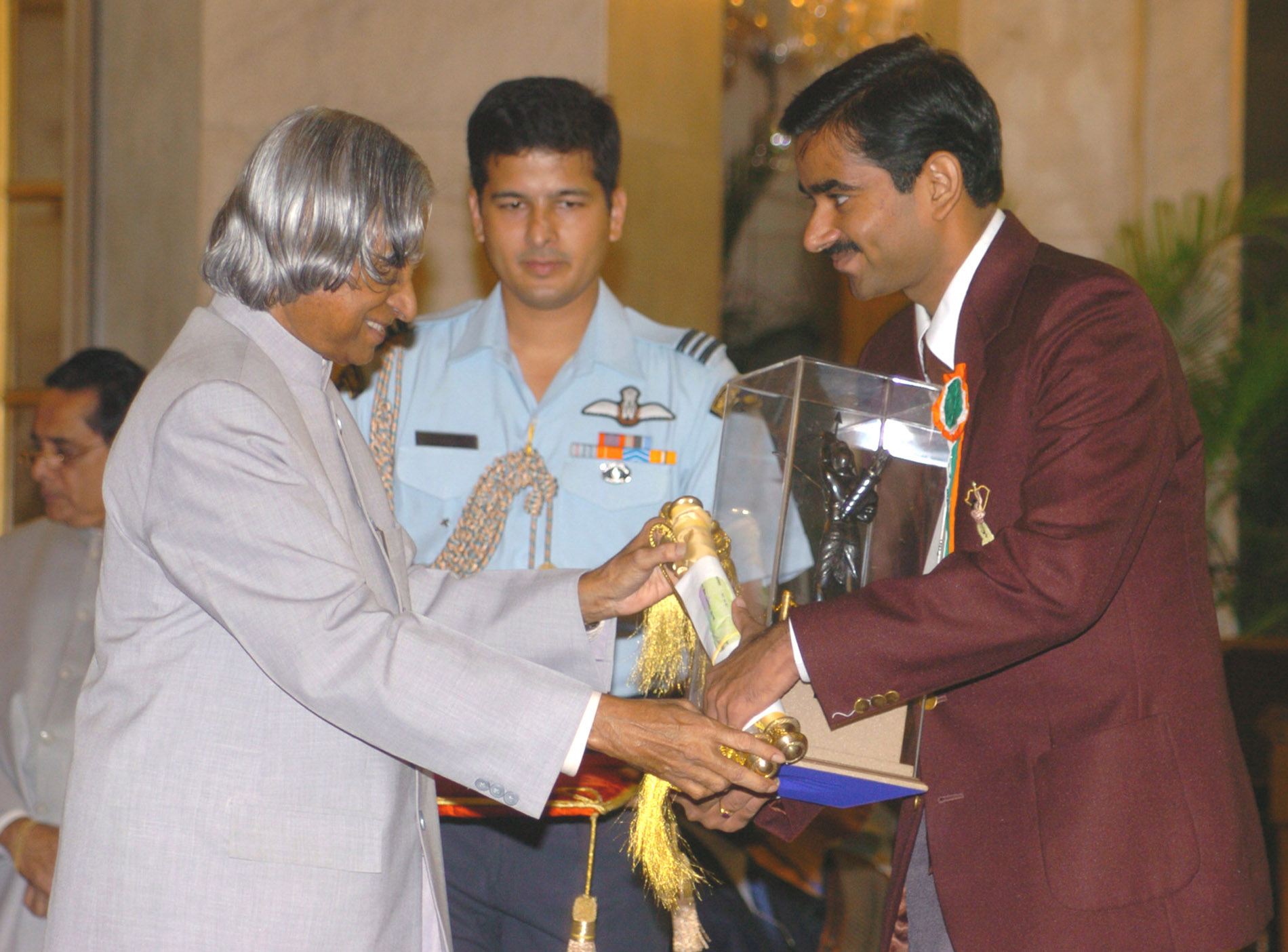

Personal information
- Born: 22 October 1979 (age 47) Allahabad, Uttar Pradesh, India
- Height: 1.73 m (5 ft 8 in)
- Weight: 68 kg (150 lb)

Sport
- Country: India
- Sport: Badminton
- Handedness: Right
- Event: Men's singles

Men's singles
- BWF profile
Medal record
Men's badminton
Representing India
World Senior Championships
Bronze medal – third place	2025 Pattaya	Men's singles 45+
Commonwealth Games
Silver medal – second place	1998 Kuala Lumpur	Men's team
South Asian Games
Gold medal – first place	2004 Islamabad	Men's team
Silver medal – second place	2004 Islamabad	Men's singles

Abhinn Shyam Gupta (born 22 October 1979 in Allahabad) is an Indian former badminton player. Presently he lives in City of Allahabad and is a former national champion in singles. Gupta played badminton at the 2004 Summer Olympics in men's singles, losing in the round of 32 to Park Tae-sang of South Korea. He had been coached by Malik Shamim Sultan.

Gupta received Arjuna Award for his contribution to the Indian badminton. He is also a proud recipient of Honoured Birla Award (1996), Laxman Award (2000) and Yash Bharti Award (2015).

== Education and profession ==
Abhinn is a graduate in B.Com. from Allahabad University, Allahabad. Currently, he is employed with Indian Oil Corporation Limited, Allahabad as a Sr. Manager.

== Records ==
Abhinn is a Limca book record holder in 2004. He is the first shuttler of India who was the national champion in all the categories viz., mini, sub-junior, junior (twice), and senior (twice).

== Major participation ==
- Common Wealth Games-Kualalampur – 1998
- World Championship-Copenhagen – 1999
- French Super Series 2001 – Winner
- Seville – 2001
- Manchester – 2002
- Asian Games-Busan – 2002
- Birmingham – 2003
- World Olympics-Athens Olympic – 2004
- U.S.A. (Qualified for the World Championship) – 2005

== Achievements ==
=== World Senior Championships ===
Men's singles

Year	Age	Venue	Opponent	Score	Result	Ref
2025	45+	Eastern National Sports Training Centre, Pattaya, Thailand	(Denmark) Casper Lund	16–21, 19–21	Bronze	

=== South Asian Games ===
Men's singles
Year	Venue	Opponent	Score	Result
2004	Rodham Hall, Islamabad, Pakistan	(India) Chetan Anand	8–15, 15–10, 13–15	Silver

=== IBF International ===
Men's singles
Year	Tournament	Opponent	Score	Result
1999	Australia International	(Indonesia) Rio Suryana	6–15, 6–15	(silver) Runner-up
2001	French International	(China) Xie Yangchun	7–1, 7–3, 7–3	(gold) Winner
2002	India Satellite	(Thailand) Jakrapan Thanathiratham	15–4, 6–15, 15–4	(gold) Winner
2004	Mauritius International	(India) Nikhil Kanetkar	17–16, 15–8	(gold) Winner
2005	Kenya International	(England) Aamir Ghaffar	15–7, 15–11	(gold) Winner
