= Chetan Anand (badminton) =

Indian badminton player

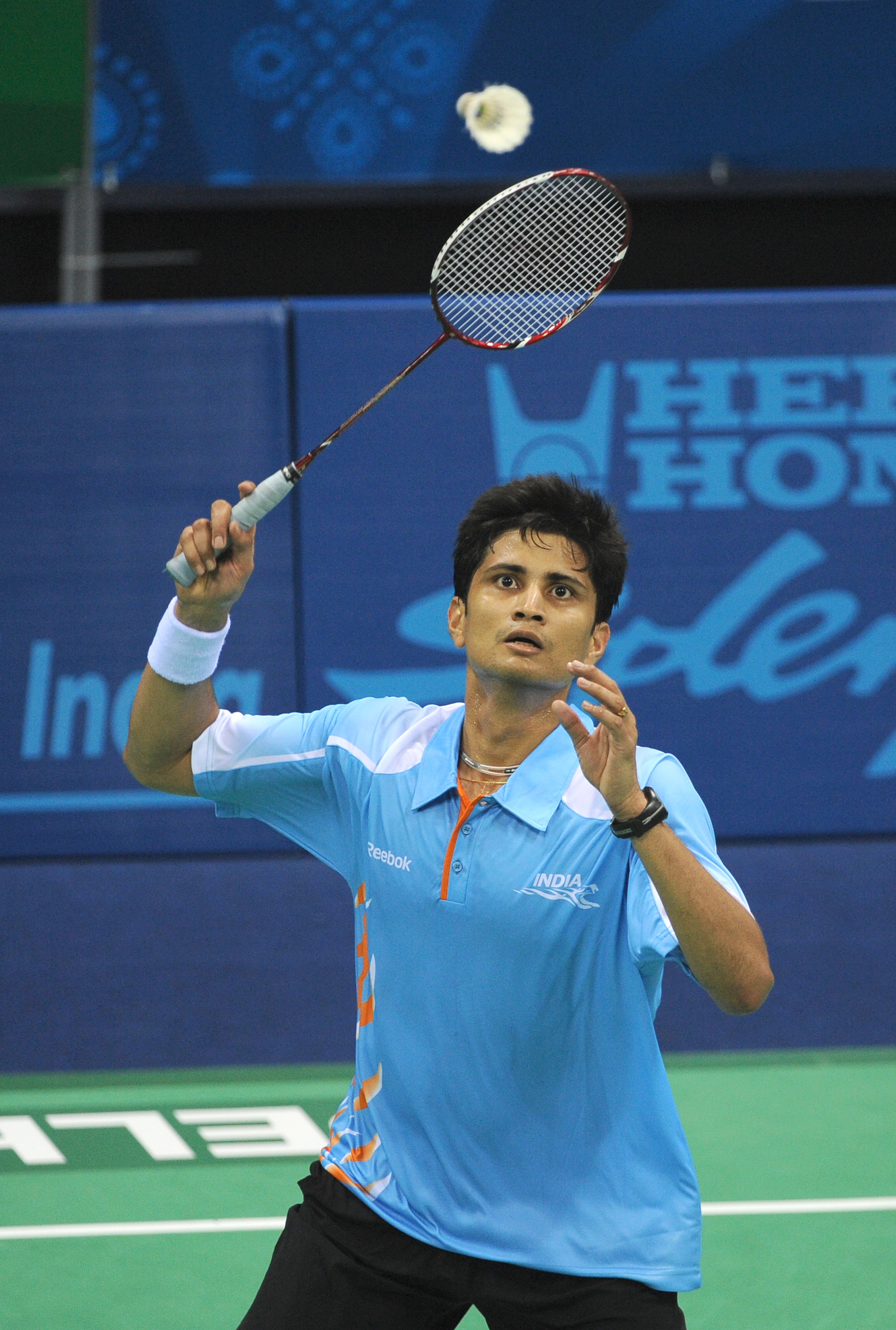
- XIX Commonwealth Games-2010 Delhi Badminton (Men’s Single) Chetan Anand of India in an action against Snider of Canada, at Sirifort Sports Complex, in New Delhi on 7 October 2010.

Personal information
- Born: 8 July 1980 (age 46) Vijayawada, Andhra Pradesh, India
- Height: 5 ft 11 in (1.80 m)
- Weight: 162 lb (73 kg)

Sport
- Country: India
- Sport: Badminton
- Handedness: Right
- Coached by: S. M. Arif

Men's singles
- Highest ranking: 10 (February 2009)
- BWF profile
Medal record
Men's badminton
Representing India
Commonwealth Games
Silver medal – second place	2010 New Delhi	Mixed team
Bronze medal – third place	2006 Melbourne	Men's singles
Bronze medal – third place	2006 Melbourne	Mixed team
South Asian Games
Gold medal – first place	2004 Islamabad	Men's singles
Gold medal – first place	2004 Islamabad	Men's team
Gold medal – first place	2006 Colombo	Men's singles
Gold medal – first place	2006 Colombo	Men's team
Gold medal – first place	2010 Dhaka	Men's singles
Gold medal – first place	2010 Dhaka	Men's team
Silver medal – second place	2010 Dhaka	Men's doubles

Chetan Anand Buradagunta (born 8 July 1980) is a badminton player from India. Anand is a four-time national champion in 2004, 2007, 2008 and 2010, and three-time South Asian Games men's singles champion in 2004, 2006 and 2010. He has a career best world ranking of world no 10. His ranking has dropped to 54 since October 2010 due to his ankle injury. He is a recipient of the Indian Arjuna Award in 2006.

== Badminton career ==
Anand started his badminton career in 1992 at the Mini Nationals in Mumbai. He was successful in doubles in his early badminton career, pairing with A. Prithvi, winning 12 year and 15 years age groups. He reached his first open nationals singles final in Kerala at age fifteen, but failed to win the title and was runner-up though he won the doubles pairing with A. Prithvi. Later, Prakash Padukone sent him to the World Academy camp in Kuala Lumpur, Malaysia, where he made significant improvements to his game. Anand won the first singles title of his career at Chennai in a Junior major ranking tournament. The same year he made his mark in the senior category as well, reaching the semi-finals in all of the senior ranking tournaments, and reaching the top eight in the country. He became the Junior National Champion in 1999. In 2001, he won his first Asian Satellite tournament in Bangalore which marked his beginning in seniors. Later he won more than 15 major ranking tournaments in India.

Anand became the national badminton champion for first time in 2004 after faltering in the finals in 2002 and 2003 to Abhinn Shyam Gupta. He also won the Toulouse Open in France in 2004, recovering from a back injury during the summer 2004. In 2005 he won Irish and Scottish open badminton tournaments in Ireland and Scotland. In 2008 he won his first Grand Prix title at the Bitburger Open. He was also the Runner-up in Dutch Grand Prix in 2008 and followed them with a couple of quarterfinal appearances. He touched his career best world ranking 10 in 2009 February. In 2009, he won the Dutch Open Grand Prix which he lost in the finals in 2008. He also won the Jaypee Syed Modi Memorial Grand Prix at Lucknow in December 2009.

== Early life ==
Anand was born to Harshavardhan and Suguna in Vijayawada, India and has a younger brother Sandeep Anand. Anand's father Harshavardhan had formerly been an annual participant in the Inter-state Lecturer's Tournaments. Anand also took a personal interest in badminton, and he started playing with his father.

He did his schooling at Veeramachineni Paddayya Siddhartha public school and bachelors in engineering in Mechanical Manufacturing from the Potluri V Prasad Siddhartha Institute of Technology in Vijayawada.

== Personal life ==
On 17 July 2005, Anand married fellow badminton player Jwala Gutta. They got divorced in 2010. Chetan married Sarada Govardhini Jasti in October 2012 and has two daughters.

== Career ==
Anand is employed by the Oil and Natural Gas Corporation in India. He was signed as the first Brand Ambassador for promoting Li Ning Sporting goods in India in 2009.He also has a badminton academy in Hyderabad(CABA).

== Achievements ==
=== Commonwealth Games ===
Men's singles
Year	Venue	Opponent	Score	Result
2006	Melbourne Convention and Exhibition Centre; Melbourne, Australia	(England) Aamir Ghaffar	21–17, 18–21, 21–13	Bronze

=== South Asian Games ===
Men's singles
Year	Venue	Opponent	Score	Result
2004	Rodham Hall; Islamabad, Pakistan	(India) Abhinn Shyam Gupta	15–8, 10–15, 15–13	Gold
2006	Sugathadasa Indoor Stadium; Colombo, Sri Lanka	(India) Nikhil Kanetkar	21–14, 21–12	Gold
2010	Wooden-Floor Gymnasium; Dhaka, Bangladesh	(India) Gurusai Dutt	21–16, 21–8	Gold

Men's doubles
Year	Venue	Partner	Opponent	Score	Result
2010	Wooden-Floor Gymnasium; Dhaka, Bangladesh	(India) Valiyaveetil Diju	(India) Rupesh Kumar K. T. (India) Sanave Thomas	19–21, retired	Silver

=== BWF Grand Prix ===
The BWF Grand Prix has two levels, the BWF Grand Prix and Grand Prix Gold. It is a series of badminton tournaments sanctioned by the Badminton World Federation (BWF) since 2007. The World Badminton Grand Prix sanctioned by International Badminton Federation (IBF) since 1983.

Men's singles
Year	Tournament	Opponent	Score	Result
2008	India Open	(Thailand) Boonsak Ponsana	16–21, 12–21	(silver) Runner-up
2008	Bitburger Open	(India) Arvind Bhat	23–25, 24–22, 23–21	(gold) Winner
2008	Dutch Open	(Indonesia) Andre Kurniawan Tedjono	15–21, 21–11, 19–21	(silver) Runner-up
2009	Syed Modi International	(Indonesia) Dionysius Hayom Rumbaka	21–17, 19–21, 21–16	(gold) Winner

BWF Grand Prix Gold tournament
BWF Grand Prix tournament

=== IBF/BWF International ===
Men's singles
Year	Tournament	Opponent	Score	Result
2001	India Satellite	(Malaysia) Allan Tai	15–11, 15–7	(gold) Winner
2004	Le Volant d'Or de Toulouse	(Denmark) Kasper Ødum	15–5, 11–15, 15–10	(gold) Winner
2005	Sri Lanka Satellite	(Malaysia) Law Yew Thien	15–10, 15–4	(gold) Winner
2005	Iceland International	(Denmark) Jens-Kristian Leth	13–15, 10–15	(silver) Runner-up
2005	Welsh International	(England) Rajiv Ouseph	15–6, 15–11	(gold) Winner
2005	Irish International	(Netherlands) Eric Pang	8–15, 15–6, 15–7	(gold) Winner
2006	Polish International	(Poland) Przemysław Wacha	18–21, 12–21	(silver) Runner-up
2007	Cyprus International	(Guatemala) Kevin Cordón	21–8, 26–24	(gold) Winner
2007	India International Challenge	(Malaysia) Chong Wei Feng	18–21, 22–20, 15–21	(silver) Runner-up
2008	Kenya International	(Spain) José Antonio Crespo	21–14, 21–7	(gold) Winner
2008	Nepal International	(India) J. B. S. Vidyadhar	21–16, 21–17	(gold) Winner
2008	Belgian International	(Japan) Kenichi Tago	16–21, 21–15, 19–21	(silver) Runner-up
2008	Czech International	(England) Carl Baxter	21–15, 21–14	(gold) Winner
2011	Maldives International	(Spain) Pablo Abián	15–21, 16–21	(silver) Runner-up
2011	Mauritius International	(Malaysia) Chiang Jiann Shiarng	21–11, 21–14	(gold) Winner

Mixed doubles
Year	Tournament	Partner	Opponent	Score	Result
2006	Sri Lanka Satellite	(India) Jwala Gutta	(Malaysia) Chan Peng Soon (Malaysia) Haw Chiou Hwee	21–10, 15–21, 21–18	(gold) Winner
2007	Cyprus International	(India) Jwala Gutta	(Denmark) Christian John Skovgaard (Denmark) Maria Kaaberbol Thorberg	21–14, 22–20	(gold) Winner

BWF International Challenge tournament
BWF International Series tournament
BWF Future Series tournament

== Record against selected opponents ==
Results are from all international competitions since Chetan Anand made his debut in 2003. The athletes listed are athletes who regularly competed at badminton's major competitions, including those who he faced at the World Championship and Olympic competition.

- (China) Bao Chunlai 0–1
- (China) Chen Hong 0–1
- (China) Chen Jin 0–2
- (China) Du Pengyu 0–1
- (Denmark) Peter Gade 0–2
- (Denmark) Kenneth Jonassen 0–4
- (Denmark) Jan Ø. Jørgensen 1–0
- (Denmark) Joachim Persson 0–3
- (Denmark) Hans-Kristian Vittinghus 3–0
- (England) Carl Baxter 2–0
- (England) Aamir Ghaffar 3–2
- (England) Rajiv Ouseph 3–0
- (England) Andrew Smith 1–3
- (Germany) Marc Zwiebler 1–1
- (Hong Kong) Chan Yan Kit 2–0
- (Hong Kong) Ng Wei 0–1
- (India) Arvind Bhat 1–2
- (India) Anup Sridhar 2–0
- (Indonesia) Sony Dwi Kuncoro 1–3
- (Indonesia) Simon Santoso 0–1
- (Japan) Sho Sasaki 3–1
- (Japan) Shoji Sato 1–1
- (Japan) Kenichi Tago 0–3
- (Malaysia) Lee Chong Wei 0–3
- (Netherlands) Dicky Palyama 2–1
- (Netherlands) Eric Pang 3–0
- (Poland) Przemyslaw Wacha 2–1
- (Singapore) Kendrick Lee Yen Hui 0–1
- (South Korea) Lee Hyun-il 0–2
- (Thailand) Boonsak Ponsana 0–1
- (Thailand) Tanongsak Saensomboonsuk 1–1
- (Vietnam) Nguyen Tien Minh 0–2
