= Marcos Bristow =

Indian badminton player

Personal information
- Born: 31 March 1970 (age 56)

Sport
- Country: India
- Sport: Badminton
- Handedness: Right
- Event: Doubles

Doubles
- BWF profile
Medal record
Men's badminton
Representing India
Commonwealth Games
Silver medal – second place	1998 Kuala Lumpur	Men's team
South Asian Games
Gold medal – first place	2004 Islamabad	Men's doubles
Gold medal – first place	2004 Islamabad	Men's team
Silver medal – second place	2004 Islamabad	Mixed doubles

Marcos Bristow (also spelled Markose, born 31 March 1970) is an Indian former badminton player. He was the silver medalist in the badminton at the 1998 Commonwealth Games in the Men's Team event.

== Achievements ==
=== South Asian Games ===
Men's doubles
Year	Venue	Partner	Opponent	Score	Result
2004	Rodham Hall; Islamabad, Pakistan	(India) Rupesh Kumar K. T.	(India) Jaseel P. Ismail (India) J. B. S. Vidyadhar	15–8, 15–4	Gold

Mixed doubles
Year	Venue	Partner	Opponent	Score	Result
2004	Rodham Hall, Islamabad, Pakistan	(India) Manjusha Kanwar	(India) Jaseel P. Ismail (India) Jwala Gutta	6–15, 3–15	Silver

=== IBF International ===
Men's doubles
Year	Tournament	Partner	Opponent	Score	Result
1998	Sri Lanka International	(India) George Thomas	(South Korea) Choi Min-ho (South Korea) Jung Sung-gyun	13–15, 12–15	(silver) Runner-up
2004	Pakistan Satellite	(India) Jaison Xavier	(Indonesia) Suprobo Bagus (Indonesia) Stenny Kusuma	5–15, 11–15	(silver) Runner-up

Mixed doubles
Year	Tournament	Partner	Opponent	Score	Result
2002	India Satellite	(India) B. R. Meenakshi	(India) Jaseel P. Ismail (India) Manjusha Kanwar	5–11, 3–11	(silver) Runner-up
2004	Pakistan Satellite	(India) B. R. Meenakshi	(Indonesia) Hendri Winarto (Indonesia) Dewi Tira Arisandi	15–11, 15–13	(gold) Winner
2005	India Satellite	(India) Aparna Balan	(India) Valiyaveetil Diju (India) B. R. Meenakshi	10–15, 4–15	(silver) Runner-up
