= Valiyaveetil Diju =

Indian badminton player (born 1981)

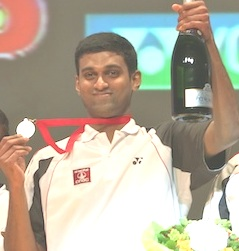
- 5 October 2008

Personal information
- Nickname: V. Diju
- Born: 4 January 1981 (age 45) Ramanattukara, Kozhikode, Kerala, India
- Height: 1.86 m (6 ft 1 in)

Sport
- Country: India
- Sport: Badminton
- Handedness: Right

Men's & mixed doubles
- Highest ranking: 6 (in XD)
- BWF profile
Medal record
Men's badminton
Representing India
Commonwealth Games
Silver medal – second place	2010 New Delhi	Mixed team
Bronze medal – third place	2006 Melbourne	Mixed team
South Asian Games
Gold medal – first place	2006 Colombo	Mixed doubles
Gold medal – first place	2006 Colombo	Men's team
Gold medal – first place	2010 Dhaka	Men's team
Gold medal – first place	2010 Dhaka	Mixed doubles
Silver medal – second place	2010 Dhaka	Men's doubles

Valiyaveetil Diju (born 4 January 1981), also known as V. Diju, is an Indian badminton player from Kozhikode, Kerala. He clinched six National Championships title, once in the men's doubles and five times in the mixed doubles. He represented India in the 2012 London Olympics, became the first Indian player to participate at the Olympics in the mixed doubles alongside Jwala Gutta. He is the winner of Arjuna Award 2014, given by the Ministry of Youth Affairs and Sports, government of India to recognize his outstanding achievement in National sports. He is also the winner of G. V. Raja awards, which is the highest government-level recognition for sports persons in Kerala. He is winner of Jimmy George award 2014. He is also winner of Vivekanandha sports excellence award 2014. He won the Youth excellence award also in 2014.He is the only mixed doubles player from India to reach top 10 in the world badminton ranking(BWF) .His highest ranking is number 6th in world ranking.

== Career ==
Diju started his International career by representing India for Asian junior badminton championship held at Hong Kong in 1997. In 2002, he and Sanave Thomas won the men's doubles title at the Indian National Championships by defeating Jaseel P. Ismail and Jaison Xavier in four games. He won the 2008 Bitburger Open in Germany along with Jwala Gutta. It was India's first mixed-doubles Grand Prix win. Diju is a five-time National mixed-doubles champion. In 2006, he won the mixed team bronze medal in Commonwealth Games at Melbourne. Diju-Gutta pair was runner-up at Indian Open held at Hyderabad in 2009. They lost to Indonesian Flandy Limpele and Vita Marissa in the final.

2009 World Badminton Championship

In August 2009, the Diju-Gutta mixed doubles pair became the first Indians to enter the quarterfinals of World Championship. The Championships was held at Hyderabad, India. The duo, seeded 8th, got a bye in the first round followed by a walkover in the second. In the third round they defeated 12th seed polish pair of Robert Mateusiak and Nadieżda Kostiuczyk 21–11, 22–20 in a 31-minute clash. In the quarter-final they went down to defending champions and second seeds Nova Widianto and Liliyana Natsir of Indonesia. The Indian pair was beaten 16–21, 14–21 in 27 minutes.

Chinese Taipei Grand Prix

On 30 August 2009, Diju partnering Jwala Gutta became the first Indian badminton mixed doubles pair to win a Grand Prix Gold title. They defeated Indonesia's Hendra Aprida Gunawan and Vita Marissa 24–22, 21–18 in the Chinese Taipei Open final. In the quarter-final, the world No. 7 pair and third seed in the tournament, defeated South Korean pair Shin Baek-cheol and Yoo Hyun-Young and in the semi-final Diju and Gutta prevailed over Malaysians Goh Liu Ying and Chan Peng Soon 21–11, 17–21, 24–22.

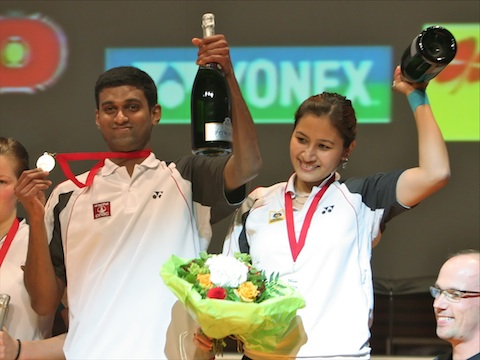
Diju with Jwala Gutta

2009 World Super Series Masters

In December 2009, Diju and his doubles partner Gutta reached the World Superseries Masters final in Johor Bahru, Malaysia. They beat Robert Mateusiak and Nadieżda Kostiuczyk of Poland in straight-games 21–19, 21–11. In the final the Indian pair went down to World Championship bronze medalists Joachim Fischer Nielsen and Christinna Pedersen 14–21, 18–21.

2010 Delhi Commonwealth Games

In 2010, Diju won the silver medal in Commonwealth Games in the mixed team event. He participated at the Asian Games in Guangzhou. Diju and Gutta pair reached the quarter-finals of the World Championships for the second consecutive year beaten by Koreans Ko Sung-hyun and Ha Jung-eun 21–16, 21–19 having beaten the English pair of Chris Adcock and Gabrielle White and Malaysians Goh Liu Ying and Chan Peng Soon in straight games and overcoming Chayut Triyachart and Yao Lei from Singapore in the pre-quarters in three games. The pair also won the 2010 India Open Grand Prix Gold for their second Grand Prix Gold title beating Triyachart and Lei in three games.

2011 Ranchi National Games winner

In 2011, Diju and Gutta reached the quarter-finals or better at three tournaments including two Super Series Premieres events at Denmark Open and China Masters where they reached the semi-finals, their first since 2009. They beat second seeded Chinese pair of Tao Jiaming and Tian Qing in the first round 5–21, 21–14, 21–18.

2012 London Olympics

Diju started his Olympic campaign pairing Jwala Gutta in mixed doubles. However they lost their opening match 16–21, 12–21 in just 25 minutes at the Wembley Arena in London.

G.V Raja Award

Government of Kerala announced him as the recipient of G.V. Raja awards for 2012–13.

== Achievements ==
=== South Asian Games ===
Men's doubles
Year	Venue	Partner	Opponent	Score	Result
2010	Wooden-Floor Gymnasium; Dhaka, Bangladesh	(India) Chetan Anand	(India) Rupesh Kumar K. T. (India) Sanave Thomas	19–21, retired	Silver

Mixed doubles
Year	Venue	Partner	Opponent	Score	Result
2006	Sugathadasa Indoor Stadium; Colombo, Sri Lanka	(India) Jwala Gutta	(India) Thomas Kurien (India) Aparna Balan	21–11, 21–13	Gold
2010	Wooden-Floor Gymnasium; Dhaka, Bangladesh	(India) Ashwini Ponnappa	(India) Sanave Thomas (India) Aparna Balan	21–11, 21–15	Gold

=== BWF Superseries Finals ===
Mixed doubles
Year	Tournament	Partner	Opponent	Score	Result
2009	Superseries Finals	(India) Jwala Gutta	(Denmark) Joachim Fischer Nielsen (Denmark) Christinna Pedersen	14–21, 18–21	(silver) Runner-up

=== BWF Grand Prix ===
The BWF Grand Prix has two levels, the BWF Grand Prix and Grand Prix Gold. It is a series of badminton tournaments sanctioned by the Badminton World Federation (BWF) since 2007. The World Badminton Grand Prix sanctioned by International Badminton Federation (IBF) since 1983.

Mixed doubles
Year	Tournament	Partner	Opponent	Score	Result
2008	Bitburger Open	(India) Jwala Gutta	(Denmark) Joachim Fischer Nielsen (Denmark) Christinna Pedersen	8–21, 21–17, 22–20	(gold) Winner
2008	Bulgarian Open	(India) Jwala Gutta	(Indonesia) Fran Kurniawan (Indonesia) Shendy Puspa Irawati	15–21, 21–18, 21–19	(gold) Winner
2009	India Open	(India) Jwala Gutta	(Indonesia) Flandy Limpele (Indonesia) Vita Marissa	14–21, 17–21	(silver) Runner-up
2009	Chinese Taipei Open	(India) Jwala Gutta	(Indonesia) Hendra Aprida Gunawan (Indonesia) Vita Marissa	23–21, 21–18	(gold) Winner
2010	India Open	(India) Jwala Gutta	(Singapore) Chayut Triyachart (Singapore) Yao Lei	23–21, 20–22, 21–7	(gold) Winner

BWF Grand Prix Gold tournament
BWF Grand Prix tournament

=== IBF International ===
Men's doubles
Year	Tournament	Partner	Opponent	Score	Result
2000	Hungarian International	(India) Sanave Thomas	(Spain) José Antonio Crespo (Spain) Sergio Llopis	17–14, 15–7	(gold) Winner
2004	India Satellite	(India) Jaseel P. Ismail	(India) Rupesh Kumar K. T. (India) Sanave Thomas	15–9, 15–1	(gold) Winner
2005	India Satellite	(India) Jaseel P. Ismail	(India) Rupesh Kumar K. T. (India) Sanave Thomas	14–17, 7–15	(silver) Runner-up
2008	Nepal International	(India) Akshay Dewalkar	(Pakistan) Mohammad Atique (Pakistan) Rizwan Azam	19–21, 21–10, 21–12	(gold) Winner
2013	Bahrain International Series	(India) K. Nandagopal	(India) Rupesh Kumar K. T. (India) Sanave Thomas	21–17, 12–21, 21–19	(gold) Winner
2013	Bahrain International Challenge	(India) K. Nandagopal	(India) Rupesh Kumar K. T. (India) Sanave Thomas	Walkover	(silver) Runner-up

Mixed doubles
Year	Tournament	Partner	Opponent	Score	Result
2005	Jakarta Satellite	(India) Jwala Gutta	(Vietnam) Trần Thanh Hải (Vietnam) Ngô Hải Vân	15–1, 15–3	(gold) Winner
2005	India Satellite	(India) B. R. Meenakshi	(India) Marcos Bristow (India) Aparna Balan	15–10, 15–4	(gold) Winner
2005	Welsh International	(India) Jwala Gutta	(Scotland) Watson Briggs (Scotland) Imogen Bankier	12–15, 15–2, 15–9	(gold) Winner
2007	Pakistan International	(India) Aparna Balan	(Sri Lanka) Diluka Karunaratne (Sri Lanka) Renu Hettiarachchige	21–11, 21–14	(gold) Winner
2007	Tata Open India International	(India) Jwala Gutta	(India) Rupesh Kumar K. T. (India) Aparna Balan	21–14, 21–16	(gold) Winner
2008	Nepal International	(India) Jwala Gutta	(India) J. B. S. Vidyadhar (India) Shruti Kurien	21–12, 21–15	(gold) Winner
2008	Bahrain International	(India) Trupti Murgunde	(India) Arun Vishnu (India) Aparna Balan	21–17, 18–21, 19–21	(silver) Runner-up
2013	Bahrain International Series	(India) N. Sikki Reddy	(India) Arun Vishnu (India) Aparna Balan	14–21, 23–25	(silver) Runner-up
2013	Bahrain International Challenge	(India) N. Sikki Reddy	(India) Sanave Thomas (India) Prajakta Sawant	21–19, 14–21, 23–23 retired	(silver) Runner-up

BWF International Challenge tournament
BWF International Series tournament
BWF Future Series tournament

== Personal life ==
Diju was born at Ramanattukara, in the Calicut district to Karunakaran and Lalitha on 4 January 1981. He did his schooling in Govt. Model Boys School, Thrissur. He completed his graduation from Farook College, Calicut. Diju is currently working as Chief Manager in ONGC, Chennai.He married Dr. Soumya on 16 September 2012. Diju and Soumya have a son, Ivaan, who was born on 16 February 2017. They also have a daughter, who was born on 4 November 2023. Diju has an elder brother Dinu.
