= Aparna Balan =

Indian badminton player (born 1986)

Personal information
- Born: 9 August 1986 (age 40) Kozhikode, Kerala, India
- Height: 1.60 m (5 ft 3 in)

Sport
- Country: India
- Sport: Badminton
- Handedness: Right

Women's & mixed doubles
- Highest ranking: 26 (WD 1 July 2010); 41 (XD 20 November 2014)
- BWF profile
Medal record
Women's badminton
Representing India
Uber Cup
Bronze medal – third place	2014 New Delhi	Women's team
Commonwealth Games
Silver medal – second place	2010 Delhi	Mixed team
South Asian Games
Gold medal – first place	2004 Islamabad	Women's team
Gold medal – first place	2006 Colombo	Women's team
Gold medal – first place	2010 Dhaka	Women's doubles
Gold medal – first place	2010 Dhaka	Women's team
Silver medal – second place	2006 Colombo	Women's doubles
Silver medal – second place	2006 Colombo	Mixed doubles
Silver medal – second place	2010 Dhaka	Mixed doubles
Commonwealth Youth Games
Silver medal – second place	2004 Bendigo	Mixed team
Asian Junior Championships
Bronze medal – third place	2002 Kuala Lumpur	Girls' team

Aparna Balan (born 9 August 1986) is an Indian badminton player from Kozhikode, Kerala. She was part of the national team that won the silver medal in 2010 Commonwealth Games, also gold medals in 2004, 2006 and 2010 South Asian Games. She is 6 times National Champion in mixed doubles and 3 times National Champion in women's doubles. She represented India in many international badminton tournaments.

== Career ==
In 2006, she won the national mixed doubles title partnering with V. Diju. At the same year, she competed at the 2006 South Asian Games and won two silver medals in the women's and mixed doubles event. In 2010 South Asian Games, Balan won the women's doubles gold with Shruti Kurien and mixed doubles silver with Sanave Thomas.

== Personal life ==
On 9 April 2018, she married Sandeep M S.

== Achievements ==
=== South Asian Games ===
Women's doubles
Year	Venue	Partner	Opponent	Score	Result
2006	Sugathadasa Indoor Stadium; Colombo, Sri Lanka	(India) B. R. Meenakshi	(India) Jwala Gutta (India) Shruti Kurien	21–18, 21–23, 12–21	Silver
2010	Wooden-Floor Gymnasium; Dhaka, Bangladesh	(India) Shruti Kurien	(India) P. C. Thulasi (India) Ashwini Ponnappa	21–19, 22–20	Gold

Mixed doubles
Year	Venue	Partner	Opponent	Score	Result
2006	Sugathadasa Indoor Stadium; Colombo, Sri Lanka	(India) Thomas Kurien	(India) V. Diju (India) Jwala Gutta	11–21, 13–21	Silver
2010	Wooden-Floor Gymnasium; Dhaka, Bangladesh	(India) Sanave Thomas	(India) V. Diju (India) Ashwini Ponnappa	11–21, 15–21	Silver

=== BWF Grand Prix ===
The BWF Grand Prix had two levels, the BWF Grand Prix and Grand Prix Gold. It was a series of badminton tournaments sanctioned by the Badminton World Federation (BWF) which was held from 2007 to 2017.

Women's doubles
Year	Tournament	Partner	Opponent	Score	Result
2009	Australian Open	(India) Shruti Kurien	(Australia) Chia Chi Huang (Australia) Tang He Tian	13–21, 19–21	(silver) Runner-up

Mixed doubles
Year	Tournament	Partner	Opponent	Score	Result
2009	India Grand Prix	(India) Arun Vishnu	(India) Tarun Kona (India) Shruti Kurien	21–14, 17–21, 21–19	(gold) Winner

BWF Grand Prix Gold tournament
BWF Grand Prix tournament

=== BWF International Challenge/Series (7 titles, 13 runners-up) ===
Women's doubles
Year	Tournament	Partner	Opponent	Score	Result
2007	Tata Open India International	(India) Jyotshna Polavarapu	(India) Jwala Gutta (India) Shruti Kurien	11–21, 8–21	(silver) Runner-up
2008	Bahrain International	(India) Sampada Sahasrabuddhe	(Germany) Nicole Grether (Canada) Charmaine Reid	16–21, 13–21	(silver) Runner-up
2009	Spanish Open	(India) Shruti Kurien	(Denmark) Line Damkjær Kruse (Denmark) Mie Schjøtt-Kristensen	14–21, 21–17, 15–21	(silver) Runner-up
2011	Bahrain International	(India) N. Siki Reddy	(Canada) Nicole Grether (Canada) Charmaine Reid	10–21, 19–21	(silver) Runner-up
2012	Tata Open India International	(India) N. Siki Reddy	(South Korea) Lee So-hee (South Korea) Shin Seung-chan	21–19, 13–21, 17–21	(silver) Runner-up
2013	Bahrain International	(India) Sanyogita Ghorpade	(India) Prajakta Sawant (India) Arathi Sara Sunil	21–18, 18–21, 16–21	(silver) Runner-up
2013	Bahrain International Challenge	(India) Sanyogita Ghorpade	(India) Pradnya Gadre (India) N. Siki Reddy	13–21, 21–19, 5–21	(silver) Runner-up
2014	Tata Open India International	(India) Prajakta Sawant	(India) Meghana Jakkampudi (India) K. Maneesha	21–13, 10–21, 21–13	(gold) Winner
2017	Nepal International	(India) Sruthi K.P	(India) Harika Veludurthi (India) Karishma Wadkar	21–8, 21–9	(gold) Winner
2018	Nepal International	(India) Sruthi K.P	(Sri Lanka) Thilini Hendahewa (Sri Lanka) Kavidi Sirimannage	21–16, 21–13	(gold) Winner
2018	Bangladesh International	(India) Sruthi K.P	(Malaysia) Vivian Hoo (Malaysia) Yap Cheng Wen	14–21, 13–21	(silver) Runner-up

Mixed doubles
Year	Tournament	Partner	Opponent	Score	Result
2007	Pakistan International	(India) Valiyaveetil Diju	(Sri Lanka) Diluka Karunaratne (Sri Lanka) Renu Hettiarachchige	21–11, 21–14	(gold) Winner
2007	Tata Open India International	(India) Rupesh Kumar	(India) Valiyaveetil Diju (India) Jwala Gutta	14–21, 16–21	(silver) Runner-up
2008	Bahrain International	(India) Arun Vishnu	(India) Valiyaveetil Diju (India) Trupti Murgunde	17–21, 21–18, 21–19	(gold) Winner
2009	Spanish Open	(India) Arun Vishnu	(England) Robin Middleton (England) Mariana Agathangelou	16–21, 15–21	(silver) Runner-up
2010	Tata Open India International	(India) Arun Vishnu	(Thailand) Patipat Chalardchaleam (Thailand) Savitree Amitapai	10–21, 15–21	(silver) Runner-up
2011	Maldives International	(India) Arun Vishnu	(Canada) Toby Ng (Canada) Grace Gao	21–10, 12–21, 9–21	(silver) Runner-up
2013	Bahrain International	(India) Arun Vishnu	(India) Valiyaveetil Diju (India) N. Siki Reddy	21–14, 25–23	(gold) Winner
2015	Sri Lanka International	(India) Arun Vishnu	(Australia) Robin Middleton (Australia) Leanne Choo	15–21, 21–17, 21–13	(gold) Winner
2015	Tata Open India International	(India) Arun Vishnu	(India) Satwiksairaj Rankireddy (India) K. Maneesha	13–21, 16–21	(silver) Runner-up

BWF International Challenge tournament
BWF International Series tournament

=== Major National Achievements ===
- National champion in mixed doubles 2006
- National champion in mixed doubles 2007
- National champion in women doubles 2011
- National champion in mixed doubles 2012
- National champion in women doubles 2012
- National champion in mixed doubles 2013
- National champion in mixed doubles 2014
- National champion in mixed doubles 2015
- National champion in mixed doubles 2016
- National champion in women doubles 2017
- National games 2015 mixed doubles gold
- Premier Badminton League 2016 winners
