= Shruti Kurien =

Indian badminton player

Personal information
- Born: 28 March 1983 (age 43) Chennai, India
- Height: 1.70 m (5 ft 7 in)

Sport
- Country: India
- Sport: Badminton
- Handedness: Right

Women's & mixed doubles
- Highest ranking: 26 (WD 1 July 2010); 62 (XD 14 January 2010)
- BWF profile
Medal record
Women's badminton
Representing India
Commonwealth Games
Bronze medal – third place	2006 Melbourne	Mixed team
South Asian Games
Gold medal – first place	2004 Islamabad	Women's doubles
Gold medal – first place	2004 Islamabad	Women's team
Gold medal – first place	2006 Colombo	Women's doubles
Gold medal – first place	2006 Colombo	Women's team
Gold medal – first place	2010 Dhaka	Women's doubles
Gold medal – first place	2010 Dhaka	Women's team

Shruti Kurien (born 28 March 1983) is an Indian badminton player. She along with partner Jwala Gutta won the National women's doubles championship in 2000 and 2002–2008. She was the gold medalists at the 2004, 2006 and 2010 South Asian Games in the women's doubles and team events, also won mixed team bronze at the 2006 Commonwealth Games. Kurien won the women's doubles Grand Prix title at 2008 Bulgaria Open. She was formerly married to Nikhil Kanetkar, another National badminton champion from Maharashtra, although the two are now divorced.

== Achievements ==
=== South Asian Games ===
Women's doubles
Year	Venue	Partner	Opponent	Score	Result
2004	Rodham Hall; Islamabad, Pakistan	(India) Jwala Gutta	(India) Fathima Nazneen (India) Manjusha Kanwar	15–6, 15–3	Gold
2006	Sugathadasa Indoor Stadium; Colombo, Sri Lanka	(India) Jwala Gutta	(India) Aparna Balan (India) B. R. Meenakshi	18–21, 23–21, 21–12	Gold
2010	Wooden-Floor Gymnasium; Dhaka, Bangladesh	(India) Aparna Balan	(India) P. C. Thulasi (India) Ashwini Ponnappa	21–19, 22–20	Gold

=== BWF Grand Prix ===
The BWF Grand Prix had two levels, the BWF Grand Prix and Grand Prix Gold. It was a series of badminton tournaments sanctioned by the Badminton World Federation (BWF) which was held from 2007 to 2017.

Women's doubles
Year	Tournament	Partner	Opponent	Score	Result
2008	Bulgaria Open	(India) Jwala Gutta	(Indonesia) Shendy Puspa Irawati (Indonesia) Meiliana Jauhari	21–11, 21–19	(gold) Winner
2009	Australian Open	(India) Aparna Balan	(Australia) Chia Chi Huang (Australia) He Tian Tang	13–21, 19–21	(silver) Runner-up

Mixed doubles
Year	Tournament	Partner	Opponent	Score	Result
2009	India Grand Prix	(India) Tarun Kona	(India) Arun Vishnu (India) Aparna Balan	14–21, 21–17, 19–21	(silver) Runner-up

BWF Grand Prix Gold tournament
BWF Grand Prix tournament

=== BWF International Challenge/Series ===
Women's doubles
Year	Tournament	Partner	Opponent	Score	Result
2004	Le Volant d'Or de Toulouse	(India) Jwala Gutta	(Bulgaria) Petya Nedelcheva (Russia) Anastasia Russkikh	11–15, 6–15	(silver) Runner-up
2004	Syed Modi India International	(India) Jwala Gutta	(Malaysia) Anita Raj Kaur (Malaysia) Wong Mew Choo	15–5, 17–15	(gold) Winner
2006	Sri Lanka Satellite	(India) Jwala Gutta	(Malaysia) Haw Chiou Hwee (Malaysia) Lim Yin Loo	21–15, 14–21, 22–20	(gold) Winner
2006	India Satellite	(India) Jwala Gutta	(South Korea) Jung Youn-kyung (South Korea) Kim Min-jung	18–21, 19–21	(silver) Runner-up
2007	Cyprus International	(India) Jwala Gutta	(Iceland) Ragna Ingolfsdottir (Estonia) Kati Tolmoff	21–12, 21–13	(gold) Winner
2007	Pakistan International	(India) Jwala Gutta	(Sri Lanka) Renu Hettiarachchige (Sri Lanka) Thilini Jayasinghe	21–13, 21–14	(gold) Winner
2007	Tata Open India International	(India) Jwala Gutta	(India) Aparna Balan (India) Jyotshna Polavarapu	21–11, 21–8	(gold) Winner
2008	Nepal International	(India) Jwala Gutta	(India) Kalita Anjali (India) Jyotshna Polavarapu	21–6, 21–8	(gold) Winner
2009	Spanish Open	(India) Aparna Balan	(Denmark) Line Damkjær Kruse (Denmark) Mie Schjøtt-Kristensen	14–21, 21–17, 15–21	(silver) Runner-up

Mixed doubles
Year	Tournament	Partner	Opponent	Score	Result
2008	Nepal International	(India) J. B. S. Vidyadhar	(India) Valiyaveetil Diju (India) Jwala Gutta	12–21, 15–21	(silver) Runner-up

BWF International Challenge tournament
BWF International Series tournament
