= Rupesh Kumar K. T. =

Indian badminton player

Personal information
- Born: Rupesh Kumar Kallyad Thazhathe Veetil; 31 August 1979 (age 47) Sirpur, Asifabad district, Andhra Pradesh, India. (present day Telangana, India)
- Height: 1.76 m (5 ft 9 in)

Sport
- Country: India
- Sport: Badminton
- Handedness: Right

Men's doubles
- Highest ranking: 13 (July 2010)
- BWF profile
Medal record
Men's badminton
Representing India
Commonwealth Games
Silver medal – second place	2010 New Delhi	Mixed team
Bronze medal – third place	2006 Melbourne	Mixed team
South Asian Games
Gold medal – first place	2004 Islamabad	Men's doubles
Gold medal – first place	2004 Islamabad	Men's team
Gold medal – first place	2006 Colombo	Men's doubles
Gold medal – first place	2006 Colombo	Men's team
Gold medal – first place	2010 Dhaka	Men's doubles
Gold medal – first place	2010 Dhaka	Men's team

Rupesh Kumar K. T. (born 31 August 1979) is an Indian badminton player from Kerala, born in Sirpur, Telangana. He is one of India's finest-ever doubles player, with nine successive national titles. He won the silver medal in mixed team event in 2010 Commonwealth Games held in Delhi, and a bronze medal in 2006 Melbourne. He, along with his doubles partner Sanave Thomas, won the BWF Grand Prix title at the 2009 New Zealand Open and 2010 Bitburger Open. He was three times men's doubles gold medalists at the South Asian Games, in 2004 partnered with Markose Bristow, and in 2006 and 2010 with Thomas.

== Achievements ==
=== South Asian Games ===
Men's doubles
Year	Venue	Partner	Opponent	Score	Result
2004	Rodham Hall; Islamabad, Pakistan	(India) Markose Bristow	(India) Jaseel P. Ismail (India) J. B. S. Vidyadhar	15–8, 15–4	Gold
2006	Sugathadasa Indoor Stadium; Colombo, Sri Lanka	(India) Sanave Thomas	(Sri Lanka) Thushara Edirisinghe (Sri Lanka) Duminda Jayakody	21–16, 21–10	Gold
2010	Wooden-Floor Gymnasium; Dhaka, Bangladesh	(India) Sanave Thomas	(India) Chetan Anand (India) V. Diju	21–19, retired	Gold

=== BWF Grand Prix ===
The BWF Grand Prix had two levels, the BWF Grand Prix and Grand Prix Gold. It was a series of badminton tournaments sanctioned by the Badminton World Federation (BWF) which was held from 2007 to 2017.

Men's doubles
Year	Tournament	Partner	Opponent	Score	Result
2008	Dutch Open	(India) Sanave Thomas	(Indonesia) Fran Kurniawan (Indonesia) Rendra Wijaya	18–21, 18–21	(silver) Runner-up
2009	Australian Open	(India) Sanave Thomas	(Malaysia) Gan Teik Chai (Malaysia) Tan Bin Shen	13–21, 11–21	(silver) Runner-up
2009	New Zealand Open	(India) Sanave Thomas	(Japan) Hirokatsu Hashimoto (Japan) Noriyasu Hirata	21–16, 15–21, 21–13	(gold) Winner
2009	Bitburger Open	(India) Sanave Thomas	(England) Chris Adcock (England) Andrew Ellis	17–21, 22–20, 24–22	(gold) Winner
2010	India Open	(India) Sanave Thomas	(Malaysia) Mohd Zakry Abdul Latif (Malaysia) Mohd Fairuzizuan Mohd Tazari	12–21, 20–22	(silver) Runner-up

BWF Grand Prix Gold tournament
BWF Grand Prix tournament

=== BWF International Challenge/Series ===
Men's doubles
Year	Tournament	Partner	Opponent	Score	Result
2004	Syed Modi International	(India) Sanave Thomas	(India) V. Diju (India) Jaseel P. Ismail	15–12, 15–8	(gold) Winner
2004	Le Volant d'Or de Toulouse	(India) Sanave Thomas	(Germany) Kristof Hopp (Germany) Ingo Kindervater	15–7, 15–13	(gold) Winner
2004	India Satellite	(India) Sanave Thomas	(India) V. Diju (India) Jaseel P. Ismail	9–15, 1–15	(silver) Runner-up
2005	Surabaya Satellite	(India) Sanave Thomas	(Indonesia) Tri Kusharyanto (Indonesia) Bambang Suprianto	9–15, 12–15	(silver) Runner-up
2005	India Satellite	(India) Sanave Thomas	(India) V. Diju (India) Jaseel P. Ismail	17–14, 15–7	(gold) Winner
2006	India Satellite	(India) Sanave Thomas	(Malaysia) Chan Peng Soon (Malaysia) Chang Hun Pin	19–21, 21–8, 22–20	(gold) Winner
2008	Croatian International	(India) Sanave Thomas	(Czech Republic) Jakub Bitman (Croatia) Zvonimir Đurkinjak	21–9, 21–14	(gold) Winner
2008	Portugal International	(India) Sanave Thomas	(Netherlands) Ruud Bosch (Netherlands) Koen Ridder	19–21, 20–22	(silver) Runner-up
2010	Bahrain International	(India) Sanave Thomas	(India) Bennet Antony Anchery (India) Alwin Francis	21–7, 16–21, 21–14	(gold) Winner
2011	Bahrain International	(India) Sanave Thomas	(Indonesia) Andrei Adistia (Indonesia) Christopher Rusdianto	21–14, 17–21, 13–21	(silver) Runner-up
2011	Tata Open India International	(India) Sanave Thomas	(India) Pranav Chopra (India) Akshay Dewalkar	21–19, 17–21, 21–23	(silver) Runner-up
2012	Austrian International	(India) Sanave Thomas	(Japan) Hiroyuki Saeki (Japan) Ryota Taohata	23–21, 22–20	(gold) Winner
2012	Bahrain International	(India) Sanave Thomas	(India) K. Nandagopal (India) Jishnu Sanyal	21–18, 19–21, 21–18	(gold) Winner
2013	Bahrain International	(India) Sanave Thomas	(India) V. Diju (India) K. Nandagopal	17–21, 21–12, 19–21	(silver) Runner-up
2013	Bahrain International Challenge	(India) Sanave Thomas	(India) V. Diju (India) K. Nandagopal	Walkover	(gold) Winner

Mixed doubles
Year	Tournament	Partner	Opponent	Score	Result
2007	India International	(India) Aparna Balan	(India) V. Diju (India) Jwala Gutta	14–21, 16–21	(silver) Runner-up

BWF International Challenge tournament
BWF International Series tournament
