= Jaseel P. Ismail =

Indian badminton player (born 1972)

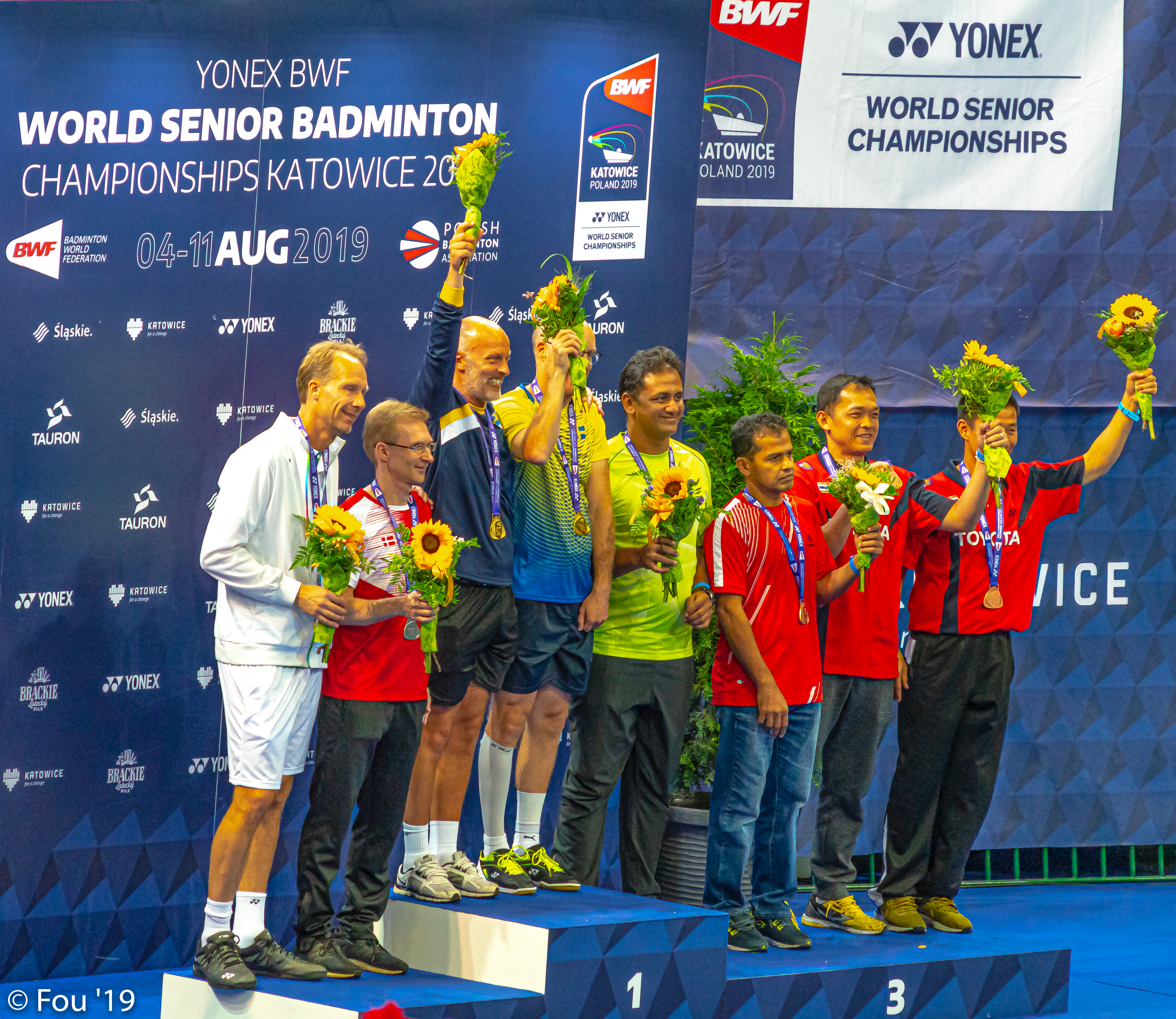

Personal information
- Born: 16 September 1972 (age 54)
- Height: 1.8 m (5 ft 11 in)

Sport
- Country: India
- Sport: Badminton
- Handedness: Right
- Event: Doubles

Doubles
- BWF profile
Medal record
Men's badminton
Representing India
Commonwealth Games
Silver medal – second place	1998 Kuala Lumpur	Men's team
South Asian Games
Gold medal – first place	2004 Islamabad	Mixed doubles
Gold medal – first place	2004 Islamabad	Men's team
Silver medal – second place	2004 Islamabad	Men's doubles

Jaseel P. Ismail (born 16 September 1972) is an Indian former badminton player from Kozhikode, Kerala, who is known for his doubles performances.

== Career ==
During his long career, Jaseel won five doubles titles at Indian National Badminton Championships, partnering George Thomas, Vijaydeep Singh, and Vincent Lobo. He also won two National mixed-doubles titles with Manjusha Kanwar as partner. Jaseel, partnering V. Diju, won the doubles title at Indian Asian Satellite 2004 held at Hyderabad. In the final the pair beat Rupesh Kumar and Sanave Thomas 15-9, 15-1. In the same year, Jaseel and Diju pair also reached the semifinals at Cheers Asian Satellite, Singapore. They upset second seeds Kovit Phisetsarasai and Nitipong Saengsila of Thailand in the men's doubles quarterfinals with a score of 15-7, 15-8. In the semifinal they went down to third-seeded Lin Woon Fui and Mohd Fairuzizuan Mohd Tazari of Malaysia.

== Achievements ==
=== South Asian Games ===
Men's doubles
Year	Venue	Partner	Opponent	Score	Result
2004	Rodham Hall, Islamabad, Pakistan	(India) J. B. S. Vidyadhar	(India) Rupesh Kumar K. T. (India) Marcos Bristow	8–15, 4–15	Silver

Mixed doubles
Year	Venue	Partner	Opponent	Score	Result
2004	Rodham Hall, Islamabad, Pakistan	(India) Jwala Gutta	(India) Marcos Bristow (India) Manjusha Kanwar	15–6, 15–3	Gold

=== IBF International ===
Men's doubles
Year	Tournament	Partner	Opponent	Score	Result
1998	India International	(India) Vincent Lobo	(Malaysia) Jeremy Gan (Malaysia) Chan Chong Ming	10–15, 15–17	(silver) Runner-up
1999	India International	(India) Vincent Lobo	(India) Rajeev Bagga (India) Vinod Kumar	15–4, 17–14	(gold) Winner
2002	Bangladesh Satellite	(India) Jaison Xavier	(India) B. Nagraj (India) J. B. S. Vidyadhar	15–6, 15–7	(gold) Winner
2004	India Satellite	(India) Valiyaveetil Diju	(India) Rupesh Kumar K. T. (India) Sanave Thomas	15–9, 15–1	(gold) Winner
2005	India Satellite	(India) Valiyaveetil Diju	(India) Rupesh Kumar K. T. (India) Sanave Thomas	14–17, 7–15	(silver) Runner-up

Mixed doubles
Year	Tournament	Partner	Opponent	Score	Result
2002	India Satellite	(India) Manjusha Kanwar	(India) Marcos Bristow (India) B. R. Meenakshi	11–5, 11–3	(gold) Winner
