= Trupti Murgunde =

Indian Badminton player

Personal information
- Born: 3 June 1982 (age 44) Pune, India
- Height: 1.69 m (5 ft 7 in)

Sport
- Country: India
- Sport: Badminton
- Handedness: Right

Women's singles & doubles
- Highest ranking: 49
- BWF profile
Medal record
Women's badminton
Representing India
Commonwealth Games
| Bronze medal – third place | 2006 Melbourne | Mixed team |
South Asian Games
| Gold medal – first place | 2004 Islamabad | Women's singles |
| Gold medal – first place | 2004 Islamabad | Women's team |
| Gold medal – first place | 2006 Colombo | Women's singles |
| Gold medal – first place | 2006 Colombo | Women's team |
| Gold medal – first place | 2010 Dhaka | Women's team |
| Silver medal – second place | 2010 Dhaka | Women's singles |

Trupti Murgunde (born 3 June 1982) is an Indian Badminton player who plays singles & doubles. She is a Dhyan Chand Awardee. The shuttler, who was born in Pune, has won the 2009 National Championship for women after remaining runners up for 3 times. She was also senior nationals doubles runner-up and junior national doubles champion. Trupti is also a five times South Asian Games gold medalist, including twice in singles in 2004 and 2006. Known for her deceptive strokes, she has also bagged 6 international titles in singles (and a total of 10 including runner-up and doubles) in BWF events from 1999 to 2014. Trupti is also a Commonwealth Games Bronze Medalist in Team Event at Melbourne in 2006. She, along with Saina Nehwal, reached the semi-finals of the women's doubles event in the Melbourne Commonwealth Games but lost in the Bronze Medal Playoff.

== Career ==
After her retirement in the year 2014, Trupti is also a Badminton Association of India selector for the Indian National Badminton Team from 2017 till date as well as a coach for the Indian Badminton Team since 2017. Besides being a Talent Scout in Khelo India, she is also working as a mentor in Mentor at JITO Foundation supporting leading sportspersons in 5 sports to excel at Olympics. Trupti has been also an expert commentator/commentator on Badminton during Rio Olympics 2016, Commonwealth Games 2018, Asian Games 2018, Thomas & Uber Cup 2014, Premier Badminton League 2013 & 2019 & various other International tournaments on leading channels like Star Sports, Sony TV, DD Sports, NDTV, India Today, Mirror Now, Wion and All India Radio.

Trupti has a long career spanning 22 years. She trained in Pune under Vasant Gore from the age of 9 during her initial years before moving out to Prakash Padukone Academy in Bengaluru and getting coached under the legendary Prakash Padukone and Vimal Kumar in Bengaluru where she has been residing since 1999. Trupti became State Champion in U-10 category in Maharashtra. Then, she went on to become the National Champion in Junior (U-18) category. She represented India for the first time at the age of 17 in Asian Junior Badminton Championships 1999 and then continued to don India colours till 2014.

She has recently been selected for being given 'Dhyan Chand Award for Lifetime Achievement in Sports and Games. The Award was conferred by the President of India on August 29, 2020. Trupti is also a member of the Governing Body of the Sports Authority of India.

Trupti is working in Indian Oil Corporation. She was a part of the expert panel of the Sony Network team that covered the Tokyo 2020 Olympics. She was the lone representative for Indian badminton, featuring as an expert on the show.

== Achievements ==
=== South Asian Games ===
Women's singles
| Year | Venue | Opponent | Score | Result |
|---|---|---|---|---|
| 2010 | Wooden-Floor Gymnasium, Dhaka, Bangladesh | (India) Sayali Gokhale | 16–21, 3–8 Retired | Silver |
| 2006 | Sugathadasa Indoor Stadium, Colombo, Sri Lanka | (India) B. R. Meenakshi | 21–5, 21–14 | Gold |
| 2004 | Rodham Hall, Islamabad, Pakistan | (India) B. R. Meenakshi | 9–11, 11–7, 13–10 | Gold |

=== BWF International Challenge/Series ===
Women's singles
| Year | Tournament | Opponent | Score | Result |
|---|---|---|---|---|
| 2014 | Uganda International | (Sri Lanka) Lekha Handunkuttihettige | 22–20, 21–14 | (gold) Winner |
| 2010 | Maldives International | (Philippines) Malvinne Ann Venice Alcala | 21–10, 11–3 Retired | (gold) Winner |
| 2009 | Czech International | (Switzerland) Jeanine Cicognini | 21–17, 21–12 | (gold) Winner |
| 2008 | Bahrain International | (India) Ashwini Ponnappa | 21–16, 21–13 | (gold) Winner |
| 2007 | Bahrain Satellite | (Italy) Agnese Allegrini | 11–21, 18–21 | (silver) Runner-up |
| 2006 | South Africa International | | | (gold) Winner |
| 2005 | Kenya International | (Mauritius) Amrita Sawaram | 11–0, 11–1 | (gold) Winner |

Women's doubles
| Year | Tournament | Partner | Opponent | Score | Result |
|---|---|---|---|---|---|
| 2005 | Sri Lanka Satellite | (India) B. R. Meenakshi | (Thailand) Soratja Chansrisukot (Thailand) Molthila Meemeak | 15–9, 9–15, 15–6 | (gold) Winner |
| 1999 | India International | (India) Ketaki Thakkar | (India) Archana Deodhar (India) P. V. V. Lakshmi | 15–9, 3–15, 3–15 | (silver) Runner-up |

Mixed doubles
| Year | Tournament | Partner | Opponent | Score | Result |
|---|---|---|---|---|---|
| 2008 | Bahrain International | (India) Valiyaveetil Diju | (India) Arun Vishnu (India) Aparna Balan | 21–17, 18–21, 19–21 | (silver) Runner-up |

BWF International Challenge tournament
BWF International Series tournament
BWF Future Series tournament
