= Sanave Thomas =

Indian badminton player

Personal information
- Full name: Sanave Thomas Arattukulam
- Born: 21 May 1980 (age 46) Mararikulam village, Alappuzha district, Kerala, India
- Height: 1.75 m (5 ft 9 in)

Sport
- Country: India
- Sport: Badminton
- Handedness: Right

Men's & mixed doubles
- Highest ranking: 13 (MD 15 July 2010); 168 (XD 17 April 2014)
- BWF profile
Medal record
Men's badminton
Representing India
Commonwealth Games
Silver medal – second place	2010 New Delhi	Mixed team
Bronze medal – third place	2006 Melbourne	Mixed team
South Asian Games
Gold medal – first place	2006 Colombo	Men's doubles
Gold medal – first place	2006 Colombo	Men's team
Gold medal – first place	2010 Dhaka	Men's doubles
Gold medal – first place	2010 Dhaka	Men's team
Silver medal – second place	2010 Dhaka	Mixed doubles

Sanave Thomas Arattukulam (born 21 May 1980) is an Indian badminton player. He won bronze medal at the 2006 Commonwealth Games and silver medal at the 2010 Commonwealth Games in mixed team event. He was the gold medalists at the 2006 and 2010 South Asian Games in the men's doubles and team events, also won silver medal in the mixed doubles in 2010.

== Achievements ==
=== South Asian Games ===
Men's doubles
Year	Venue	Partner	Opponent	Score	Result
2006	Sugathadasa Indoor Stadium; Colombo, Sri Lanka	(India) Rupesh Kumar K. T.	(Sri Lanka) Thushara Edirisinghe (Sri Lanka) Duminda Jayakody	21–16, 21–10	Gold
2010	Wooden-Floor Gymnasium; Dhaka, Bangladesh	(India) Rupesh Kumar K. T.	(India) Chetan Anand (India) V. Diju	21–19, retired	Gold

Mixed doubles
Year	Venue	Partner	Opponent	Score	Result
2010	Wooden-Floor Gymnasium; Dhaka, Bangladesh	(India) Aparna Balan	(India) V. Diju (India) Ashwini Ponnappa	11–21, 15–21	Silver

=== BWF Grand Prix ===
The BWF Grand Prix had two levels, the BWF Grand Prix and Grand Prix Gold. It was a series of badminton tournaments sanctioned by the Badminton World Federation (BWF) which was held from 2007 to 2017.

Men's doubles
Year	Tournament	Partner	Opponent	Score	Result
2008	Dutch Open	(India) Rupesh Kumar K. T.	(Indonesia) Fran Kurniawan (Indonesia) Rendra Wijaya	18–21, 18–21	(silver) Runner-up
2009	Australian Open	(India) Rupesh Kumar K. T.	(Malaysia) Gan Teik Chai (Malaysia) Tan Bin Shen	13–21, 11–21	(silver) Runner-up
2009	New Zealand Open	(India) Rupesh Kumar K. T.	(Japan) Hirokatsu Hashimoto (Japan) Noriyasu Hirata	21–16, 15–21, 21–13	(gold) Winner
2009	Bitburger Open	(India) Rupesh Kumar K. T.	(England) Chris Adcock (England) Andrew Ellis	17–21, 22–20, 24–22	(gold) Winner
2010	India Open	(India) Rupesh Kumar K. T.	(Malaysia) Mohd Zakry Abdul Latif (Malaysia) Mohd Fairuzizuan Mohd Tazari	12–21, 20–22	(silver) Runner-up

BWF Grand Prix Gold tournament
BWF Grand Prix tournament

=== BWF International Challenge/Series ===
Men's doubles
Year	Tournament	Partner	Opponent	Score	Result
2000	Hungarian International	(India) V. Diju	(Spain) José Antonio Crespo (Spain) Sergio Llopis	17–14, 15–7	(gold) Winner
2004	Syed Modi International	(India) Rupesh Kumar K. T.	(India) V. Diju (India) Jaseel P. Ismail	15–12, 15–8	(gold) Winner
2004	Le Volant d'Or de Toulouse	(India) Rupesh Kumar K. T.	(Germany) Kristof Hopp (Germany) Ingo Kindervater	15–7, 15–13	(gold) Winner
2004	India Satellite	(India) Rupesh Kumar K. T.	(India) V. Diju (India) Jaseel P. Ismail	9–15, 1–15	(silver) Runner-up
2005	Surabaya Satellite	(India) Rupesh Kumar K. T.	(Indonesia) Tri Kusharjanto (Indonesia) Bambang Suprianto	9–15, 12–15	(silver) Runner-up
2005	India Satellite	(India) Rupesh Kumar K. T.	(India) V. Diju (India) Jaseel P. Ismail	17–14, 15–7	(gold) Winner
2006	India Satellite	(India) Rupesh Kumar K. T.	(Malaysia) Chan Peng Soon (Malaysia) Chang Hun Pin	19–21, 21–8, 22–20	(gold) Winner
2008	Croatian International	(India) Rupesh Kumar K. T.	(Czech Republic) Jakub Bitman (Croatia) Zvonimir Đurkinjak	21–9, 21–14	(gold) Winner
2008	Portugal International	(India) Rupesh Kumar K. T.	(Netherlands) Ruud Bosch (Netherlands) Koen Ridder	19–21, 20–22	(silver) Runner-up
2009	Bahrain International	(India) Aneesh Aneefa Kannangayath	(Bahrain) Ebrahim Jaffer Al Sayed Jaffer (Bahrain) Heri Setiawan	21–16, 21–14	(gold) Winner
2010	Bahrain International	(India) Rupesh Kumar K. T.	(India) Bennet Antony Anchery (India) Alwin Francis	21–7, 16–21, 21–14	(gold) Winner
2011	Bahrain International	(India) Rupesh Kumar K. T.	(Indonesia) Andrei Adistia (Indonesia) Christopher Rusdianto	21–14, 17–21, 13–21	(silver) Runner-up
2011	Tata Open India International	(India) Rupesh Kumar K. T.	(India) Pranav Chopra (India) Akshay Dewalkar	21–19, 17–21, 21–23	(silver) Runner-up
2012	Austrian International	(India) Rupesh Kumar K. T.	(Japan) Hiroyuki Saeki (Japan) Ryota Taohata	23–21, 22–20	(gold) Winner
2012	Bahrain International	(India) Rupesh Kumar K. T.	(India) K. Nandagopal (India) Jishnu Sanyal	21–18, 19–21, 21–18	(gold) Winner
2013	Bahrain International	(India) Rupesh Kumar K. T.	(India) V. Diju (India) K. Nandagopal	17–21, 21–12, 19–21	(silver) Runner-up
2013	Bahrain International Challenge	(India) Rupesh Kumar K. T.	(India) V. Diju (India) K. Nandagopal	Walkover	(gold) Winner

Mixed doubles
Year	Tournament	Partner	Opponent	Score	Result
2013	Bahrain International Challenge	(India) Prajakta Sawant	(India) V. Diju (India) N. Siki Reddy	19–21, 21–14, 23–23 retired	(gold) Winner

BWF International Challenge tournament
BWF International Series tournament
