= B. R. Meenakshi =

Indian badminton player (born 1979)

Personal information
- Born: 20 September 1979 (age 47)

Sport
- Sport: Badminton
- BWF profile
Medal record
Women's badminton
Representing India
South Asian Games
Gold medal – first place	2004 Islamabad	Women's team
Gold medal – first place	2006 Colombo	Women's team
Silver medal – second place	2004 Islamabad	Women's singles
Silver medal – second place	2006 Colombo	Women's singles
Silver medal – second place	2006 Colombo	Women's doubles

B. R. Meenakshi (born 20 September 1979) is an Indian badminton player.

== Career ==
B. R. Meenakshi won in 1997 and 1998 four medals at the Indian Individual Junior Championships. In 1999 she finished second and third in the Indian Open. She competed at the 2002 Commonwealth Games in the mixed doubles (with Markose Bristow) and women's singles events. In 2004, she won her only national title among the adults and was third at the Indian Open. In 2006, she once again won two silver medals at the South Asian Games.

== Achievements ==
=== South Asian Games ===
Women's singles
Year	Venue	Opponent	Score	Result
2006	Sugathadasa Indoor Stadium, Colombo, Sri Lanka	(India) Trupti Murgunde	5–21, 14–21	Silver
2004	Rodham Hall, Islamabad, Pakistan	(India) Trupti Murgunde	11–9, 7–11, 10–13	Silver

Women's doubles
Year	Venue	Partner	Opponent	Score	Result
2006	Sugathadasa Indoor Stadium; Colombo, Sri Lanka	(India) Aparna Balan	(India) Jwala Gutta (India) Shruti Kurien	21–18, 21–23, 12–21	Silver

=== IBF International ===
Women's singles
Year	Tournament	Opponent	Score	Result
1999	India International	(India) P. V. V. Lakshmi	7–11, 11–4, 13–10	(gold) Winner
2001	India Satellite	(India) Aparna Popat	4–11, 5–11	(silver) Runner-up
2003	Sri Lanka International	(China) Liu Zhen	11–8, 11–8	(gold) Winner
2004	Pakistan Satellite	(India) Sharada Govardhini	11–3, 11–2	(gold) Winner

Women's doubles
Year	Tournament	Partner	Opponent	Score	Result
2001	India Satellite	(India) Oli Deka	(Thailand) Salakjit Ponsana (Thailand) Nucharin Teekhatrakul	4–15, 5–15	(silver) Runner-up
2003	Sri Lanka International	(India) Fathima Nazneen	(China) Fan Jingjing (China) Liu Zhen	9–11, 9–11	(silver) Runner-up
2005	Sri Lanka International	(India) Trupti Murgunde	(Thailand) Soratja Chansrisukot (Thailand) Molthila Meemeak	15–9, 9–15, 15–6	(gold) Winner

Mixed doubles
Year	Tournament	Partner	Opponent	Score	Result
1999	India International	(India) Vinod Kumar	(India) J. B. S. Vidyadhar (India) P. V. V. Lakshmi	14–17, 6–15	(silver) Runner-up
2001	India Satellite	(India) Sandesh Chouta	(India) J. B. S. Vidyadhar (India) Jwala Gutta	10–15, 15–11, 9–15	(silver) Runner-up
2002	India Satellite	(India) Marcos Bristow	(India) Jaseel P. Ismail (India) Manjusha Kanwar	5–11, 3–11	(silver) Runner-up
2004	Pakistan Satellite	(India) Marcos Bristow	(Indonesia) Hendri Winarto (Indonesia) Dewi Tira Arisandi	15–11, 15–13	(gold) Winner
2005	India Satellite	(India) Valiyaveetil Diju	(India) Marcos Bristow (India) Aparna Balan	15–10, 15–4	(gold) Winner
