= Manjusha Kanwar =

Indian badminton player

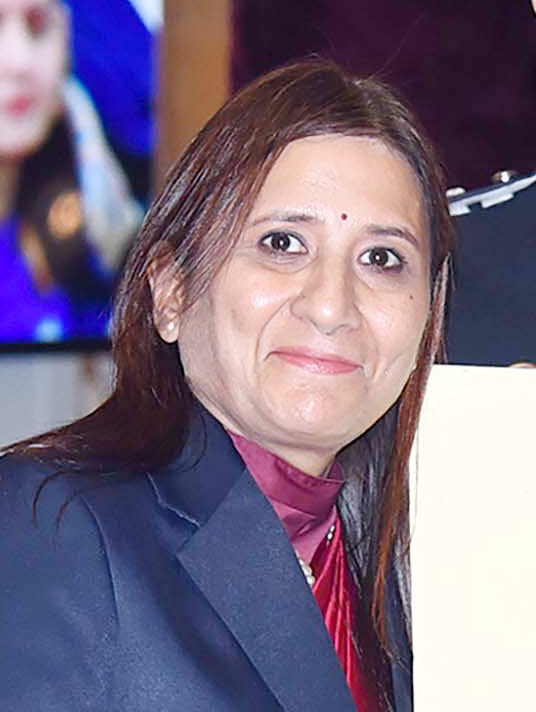
- Kanwar in 2024

Personal information
- Born: 20 March 1971 (age 55) Pune, Maharashtra, India
- Height: 1.75 m (5 ft 9 in)

Sport
- Country: India
- Sport: Badminton
- Handedness: Right
- BWF profile
Medal record
Representing India
Women's badminton
Commonwealth Games
Bronze medal – third place	1998 Kuala Lumpur	Women's team
South Asian Games
Gold medal – first place	2004 Islamabad	Women's team
Silver medal – second place	2004 Islamabad	Women's doubles
Silver medal – second place	2004 Islamabad	Mixed doubles

Manjusha Kanwar (née Pavangadkar, born 20 March 1971) is an Indian former badminton player. She was born in Pune, Maharashtra, India. Presently works as Deputy General Manager in Sports Department Indian Oil Corporation, New Delhi. She was part of Indian Badminton League in 2018–20 as a Coach of Delhi Team. She was honored with the FICCI Life Time Achievement Award in 2020 for her achievements both as a player and her work for the promotion of sports.

== Career ==
Manjusha Kanwar won the National Championships in India for the first time in 1991. Nine more titles followed until 2002. Bronze Medalist in Commonwealth Games in 1998 (Teams) wherein she played both singles and doubles. Gold medalist in South Asian Games 2004 in teams and silver medalist in Women's Doubles and Mixed Doubles. She represented India for 12 years.

== Achievements ==
=== South Asian Games ===
Women's doubles
Year	Venue	Partner	Opponent	Score	Result
2004	Rodham Hall, Islamabad, Pakistan	(India) Fathima Nazneen	(India) Shruti Kurien (India) Jwala Gutta	6–15, 3–15	Silver

Mixed doubles
Year	Venue	Partner	Opponent	Score	Result
2004	Rodham Hall, Islamabad, Pakistan	(India) Marcos Bristow	(India) Jaseel P. Ismail (India) Jwala Gutta	6–15, 3–15	Silver

=== IBF International ===
Women's singles
Year	Tournament	Opponent	Score	Result
1999	Wellington International	(New Zealand) Rhona Robertson	3–11, 3–11	(silver) Runner-up

Women's doubles
Year	Tournament	Partner	Opponent	Score	Result
1998	India International	(India) Archana Deodhar	(India) Madhumita Bisht (India) P. V. V. Lakshmi	15–6, 13–15, 9–15	(silver) Runner-up

Mixed doubles
Year	Tournament	Partner	Opponent	Score	Result
2002	India Satellite	(India) Jaseel P. Ismail	(India) Marcos Bristow (India) B. R. Meenakshi	11–5, 11–3	(gold) Winner
