= Badminton at the 2016 South Asian Games – Women's team =

Badminton – Men's team at the 2016 South Asian Games
- Venue: NEIGRIHMS Indoor Stadium
- Dates: 6 – 8 February 2016

Medalists
gold medal	India
silver medal	Sri Lanka
bronze medal	Bangladesh
bronze medal	Nepal

The women's team badminton event at the 2016 South Asian Games was held from 6 to 8 February at the NEIGRIHMS Indoor Stadium in Shillong.

== Schedule ==
All times are Indian Standard Time (UTC+05:30)

Date	Time	Event
Saturday, 6 February	12:00	Group stage
Sunday, 7 February	10:00	Group stage
Sunday, 7 February	16:00	Group stage
Monday, 8 February	10:00	Semi-finals
Monday, 8 February	11:00	Semi-finals
Monday, 8 February	15:00	Gold medal match

== Group stage ==
=== Group A ===
Pos	Team	Pld	W	L	MF	MA	MD	GF	GA	GD	PF	PA	PD	Pts	Qualification
1	India (H)	2	2	0	6	0	+6	8	0	+8	168	42	+126	2	Knockout stage
2	Nepal	2	1	1	3	3	0	6	6	0	162	159	+3	1	Knockout stage
3	Afghanistan	2	0	2	0	6	−6	0	8	−8	39	168	−129	0	

Source: TS
(H) Host

Nepal
3
NEIGRIHMS Indoor Stadium, Court 2
6 February 2016, 12:00

Afghanistan
0

			1	2	3
1	(Nepal) (Afghanistan)	Sara Devi Tamang; Zainab Yari	21; 3	21; 10
2	(Nepal) (Afghanistan)	Nangsal Tamang; Lidaa Saraj	21; 4	21; 6
3	(Nepal) (Afghanistan)	Nangsal Tamang / Sara Devi Tamang; Lidaa Saraj / Zainab Yari	21; 6	21; 4
4	(Nepal) (Afghanistan)	Amita Giri; Lidaa Saraj				not played
5	(Nepal) (Afghanistan)	Amita Giri / Sichhya Shrestha; Lidaa Saraj / Zainab Yari				not played

India
3
NEIGRIHMS Indoor Stadium, Court 2
7 February 2016, 10:00

Nepal
0

			1	2	3
1	(India) (Nepal)	P. V. Sindhu; Sara Devi Tamang	21; 2	21; 8
2	(India) (Nepal)	Gadde Ruthvika Shivani; Nangsal Tamang	21; 6	21; 2
3	(India) (Nepal)	Ashwini Ponnappa / P. V. Sindhu; Nangsal Tamang / Sara Devi Tamang	21; 10	21; 14
4	(India) (Nepal)	P. C. Thulasi; Amita Giri				not played
5	(India) (Nepal)	K. Maneesha / N. Sikki Reddy; Amita Giri / Sichhya Shrestha				not played

India
3
NEIGRIHMS Indoor Stadium, Court 2
7 February 2016, 16:00

Afghanistan
0

			1	2	3
1	(India) (Afghanistan)	P. V. Sindhu; Zainab Yari	21; 3	21; 3
2	(India) (Afghanistan)	Gadde Ruthvika Shivani; Lidaa Saraj				w/o
3	(India) (Afghanistan)	Ashwini Ponnappa / P. V. Sindhu; Lidaa Saraj / Zainab Yari				w/o
4	(India) (Afghanistan)	P. C. Thulasi; Lidaa Saraj				not played
5	(India) (Afghanistan)	P. C. Thulasi / Vrushali Gummadi; Lidaa Saraj / Zainab Yari				not played

=== Group B ===
Pos	Team	Pld	W	L	MF	MA	MD	GF	GA	GD	PF	PA	PD	Pts	Qualification
1	Sri Lanka	3	3	0	9	0	+9	18	0	+18	378	114	+264	3	Knockout stage
2	Bangladesh	3	2	1	6	3	+3	12	6	+6	299	279	+20	2	Knockout stage
3	Pakistan	3	1	2	3	6	−3	6	13	−7	272	376	−104	1	
4	Maldives	3	0	3	0	9	−9	1	18	−17	219	399	−180	0	

Source: TS

Bangladesh
3
NEIGRIHMS Indoor Stadium, Court 1
6 February 2016, 12:00

Maldives
0

			1	2	3
1	(Bangladesh) (Maldives)	Alina Sultana; Moosa Aminath Shahurunaz	21; 13	21; 11
2	(Bangladesh) (Maldives)	Shapla Akter; Maisa Fathuhulla Ismail	21; 7	21; 6
3	(Bangladesh) (Maldives)	Shapla Akter / Alina Sultana; Aishath Afnaan Rasheed / Moosa Aminath Shahurunaz	21; 16	21; 9
4	(Bangladesh) (Maldives)	Dulali Haldar; Aishath Afnaan Rasheed				not played
5	(Bangladesh) (Maldives)	Dulali Haldar / Bristy Khatun; Aminath Ahmed Didi / Maisa Fathuhulla Ismail				not played

Sri Lanka
3
NEIGRIHMS Indoor Stadium, Court 3
6 February 2016, 12:00

Pakistan
0

			1	2	3
1	(Sri Lanka) (Pakistan)	Kavidi Sirimannage; Khizra Rasheed	21; 6	21; 5
2	(Sri Lanka) (Pakistan)	Thilini Hendahewa; Sidra Hamad	21; 1	21; 10
3	(Sri Lanka) (Pakistan)	Achini Nimeshika Ratnasiri / Upuli Samanthika Weerasinghe; Sara Mohammad / Saima Waqas	21; 3	21; 9
4	(Sri Lanka) (Pakistan)	Lekha Shehani; Sehra Akram				not played
5	(Sri Lanka) (Pakistan)	Oshadie Kuruppu / Kavidi Sirimannage; Sidra Hamad / Khizra Rasheed				not played

Sri Lanka
3
NEIGRIHMS Indoor Stadium, Court 1
7 February 2016, 10:00

Bangladesh
0

			1	2	3
1	(Sri Lanka) (Bangladesh)	Thilini Hendahewa; Dulali Haldar	21; 2	21; 7
2	(Sri Lanka) (Bangladesh)	Lekha Shehani; Bristy Khatun	21; 12	21; 10
3	(Sri Lanka) (Bangladesh)	Achini Nimeshika Ratnasiri / Upuli Samanthika Weerasinghe; Dulali Haldar / Bristy Khatun	21; 9	21; 7
4	(Sri Lanka) (Bangladesh)	Achini Nimeshika Ratnasiri; Rehana Parvin				not played
5	(Sri Lanka) (Bangladesh)	Chandrika de Silva / Nadeesha Gayanthi; Rehana Parvin / Alina Sultana				not played

Pakistan
3
NEIGRIHMS Indoor Stadium, Court 3
7 February 2016, 10:00

Maldives
0

			1	2	3
1	(Pakistan) (Maldives)	Khizra Rasheed; Moosa Aminath Shahurunaz	21; 18	21; 17
2	(Pakistan) (Maldives)	Sidra Hamad; Maisa Fathuhulla Ismail	21; 19	22; 20
3	(Pakistan) (Maldives)	Sara Mohammad / Saima Waqas; Aishath Afnaan Rasheed / Moosa Aminath Shahurunaz	21; 17	20; 22	21; 11
4	(Pakistan) (Maldives)	Sehra Akram; Aishath Afnaan Rasheed
5	(Pakistan) (Maldives)	Sidra Hamad / Khizra Rasheed; Aminath Ahmed Didi / Maisa Fathuhulla Ismail				not played

Sri Lanka
3
NEIGRIHMS Indoor Stadium, Court 1
7 February 2016, 16:00

Maldives
0

			1	2	3
1	(Sri Lanka) (Maldives)	Kavidi Sirimannage; Moosa Aminath Shahurunaz	21; 11	21; 1
2	(Sri Lanka) (Maldives)	Thilini Hendahewa; Maisa Fathuhulla Ismail	21; 4	21; 7
3	(Sri Lanka) (Maldives)	Achini Nimeshika Ratnasiri / Upuli Samanthika Weerasinghe; Aishath Afnaan Rasheed / Moosa Aminath Shahurunaz	21; 3	21; 7
4	(Sri Lanka) (Maldives)	Lekha Shehani; Aishath Afnaan Rasheed				not played
5	(Sri Lanka) (Maldives)	Oshadie Kuruppu / Kavidi Sirimannage; Aminath Ahmed Didi / Maisa Fathuhulla Ismail				not played

Bangladesh
3
NEIGRIHMS Indoor Stadium, Court 3
7 February 2016, 16:00

Pakistan
0

			1	2	3
1	(Bangladesh) (Pakistan)	Alina Sultana; Khizra Rasheed	21; 19	21; 13
2	(Bangladesh) (Pakistan)	Shapla Akter; Sidra Hamad	21; 17	21; 14
3	(Bangladesh) (Pakistan)	Shapla Akter / Alina Sultana; Sara Mohammad / Saima Waqas	21; 17	21; 11
4	(Bangladesh) (Pakistan)	Dulali Haldar; Sehra Akram				not played
5	(Bangladesh) (Pakistan)	Dulali Haldar / Bristy Khatun; Sidra Hamad / Khizra Rasheed				not played

== Knockout stage ==
Semi-finals
A1	India	3
B2	Bangladesh	0
A2	Nepal	0
B1	Sri Lanka	3

Gold medal match
A1	India	3
B1	Sri Lanka	0

=== Semi-finals ===
Sri Lanka
3
NEIGRIHMS Indoor Stadium, Court 3
8 February 2016, 10:00

Nepal
0

			1	2	3
1	(Sri Lanka) (Nepal)	Kavidi Srimannage; Sara Devi Tamang	21; 11	21; 7
2	(Sri Lanka) (Nepal)	Thilini Hendahewa; Nangsal Tamang	21; 10	21; 12
3	(Sri Lanka) (Nepal)	Oshadie Kuruppu / Kavidi Srimannage; Nangsal Tamang / Sara Devi Tamang	21; 10	21; 6
4	(Sri Lanka) (Nepal)	Lekha Shehani; Amita Giri				not played
5	(Sri Lanka) (Nepal)	Chandrika de Silva / Nadeesha Gayanthi; Amita Giri / Sichhya Shrestha				not played

India
3
NEIGRIHMS Indoor Stadium, Court 1
8 February 2016, 11:00

Bangladesh
0

			1	2	3
1	(India) (Bangladesh)	P. V. Sindhu; Alina Sultana	21; 9	21; 9
2	(India) (Bangladesh)	Gadde Ruthvika Shivani; Dulali Haldar	21; 5	21; 6
3	(India) (Bangladesh)	Ashwini Ponnappa / P. V. Sindhu; Dulali Haldar / Bristy Khatun	21; 11	21; 12
4	(India) (Bangladesh)	P. C. Thulasi; Bristy Khatun				not played
5	(India) (Bangladesh)	K. Maneesha / N. Sikki Reddy; Shapla Akter / Rehana Parvin				not played

=== Gold medal match ===
India
3
NEIGRIHMS Indoor Stadium, Court 1
8 February 2016, 15:00

Sri Lanka
0

			1	2	3
1	(India) (Sri Lanka)	P. V. Sindhu; Kavidi Srimannage	21; 7	21; 5
2	(India) (Sri Lanka)	Gadde Ruthvika Shivani; Thilini Hendahewa	23; 21	21; 13
3	(India) (Sri Lanka)	Ashwini Ponnappa / P. V. Sindhu; Achini Nimeshika Ratnasiri / Upuli Samanthika Weerasinghe	21; 11	21; 12
4	(India) (Sri Lanka)	P. C. Thulasi; Lekha Shehani				not played
5	(India) (Sri Lanka)	K. Maneesha / N. Sikki Reddy; Oshadie Kuruppu / Kavidi Srimannage				not played
