= Ghazala Siddique =

Pakistani badminton player

Personal information
- Born: 12 April 1994 (age 32) Pakistan

Sport
- Country: Pakistan
- Sport: Badminton

Singles and mixed doubles
- Highest ranking: 505 (WS 16 August 2018) 493 (XD 17 March 2020)
- Current ranking: 588 (WS 16 November 2020); 493 (XD 16 November 2020)
- BWF profile
Medal record
Women's badminton
Representing Pakistan
South Asian Games
Bronze medal – third place	2019 Kathmandu-Pokhara	Women's team

Ghazala Siddique, also spelled Ghazala Saddique (born 12 April 1994), is a badminton player from Pakistan.

== Career ==
=== National ===
Siddique represents WAPDA in domestic competitions including National Championships and National Games.

2020

At the 57th National Badminton Championship held in Lahore, Pakistan, Siddique was runners-up in the singles event, losing in the final (19–21, 13–21) to defending champion Mahoor Shahzad. In the women's doubles event final, she and her partner, Zubaira Islam (SNGPL) were defeated by Mahoor Shahzad (Wapda) and Palwasha Bashir (NBP) 2-1 (11–21, 21–10, 3-21). In the mixed doubles final, she and her partner, M Ali Larosh were beaten by Zunain Javed and Farzana Ali 2-0 (12–21, 20–22).

=== International ===
In 2014, Siddiqui participated in singles and mixed doubles events at the Indian Club Centenary Li-Ning Bahrain International Challenge held in Manama, Bahrain. In the singles she lost in the round of 32 to Indian, Aparna Balan (14–21, 5-21) while in the mixed doubles, pairing with Muhammad Irfan Saeed Bhatti, she lost in the round of 16 to the Indian pair of Arun Vishnu and Aparna Balan (11–21,7-21). In 2016, at the Yonex Sunrise Pakistan International Series, she competed in singles, doubles and mixed doubles events. In singles, she lost to her compatriot, Sehra Akram, in the round of 16 (18–21, 9-21). In the mixed doubles she teamed up with Anjum Bashir. They lost to compatriots, Muhammad Irfan Saeed Bhatti and Mehmona Ameer (15–21, 17–21) in the quarter-finals. In the women's doubles she and her doubles partner Javeria Tahir lost in the semi-finals to compatriots, Sidra Hamad and Khizra Rasheed (18–21, 18–21). In 2017, she once again competed at the Yonex Sunrise Pakistan International Series event in Islamabad, though only in singles and mixed doubles. In singles she lost to compatriot, Sehra Akram in the quarter-finals (21–23, 10–21). In the mixed doubles, teaming up with Muhammad Attique she lost in the quarter-finals to the Nepali pair of Bishnu Katwal and Sunayana Mukhiya (21–15, 21–23, 19–21). At the Asian Games held in Jakarta, Indonesia in 2018, she competed only in the women's double event where pairing with Saima Waqas she won her first match again the Maldives pair of Neela Najeeb and Moosa Aminath Shahurunaz (22–20, 18–21, 21–15). She then lost in the round of 16 to the Japanese pair of Misaki Matsutomo and Ayaka Takahashi (3-21, 3-21). Siddique was part of the six member women's team which competed at the 2019 South Asian Games held in Kathmandu, Nepal.

Events participated in:

1. The Indian Club Centenary Li-Ning Bahrain International Challenge (2014)
2. Yonex- Sunrise Pakistan International Series (2016)
3. Yonex- Sunrise Pakistan International Series (2017)
4. Asian Games (2018)
5. South Asian Games (2019)

Registered but did not participate in:

1. Dong Feng Citroen Badminton Asia Championships, Wuhan, China (2015) (singles and mixed doubles)
