= Buwaneka Goonethilleka =

Sri Lankan badminton player

Personal information
- Born: Buwaneka Tharindu Dullewa Dumbukola Goonethilleka; 8 May 1996 (age 30) Mahamodara, Southern Province, Sri Lanka
- Years active: 2012–present
- Height: 1.88 m (6 ft 2 in)
- Weight: 64 kg (141 lb)

Sport
- Country: Sri Lanka
- Sport: Badminton
- Handedness: Right

Men's doubles
- Highest ranking: 72 (with Sachin Dias, 15 November 2022)
- BWF profile
Medal record
Men's badminton
Representing Sri Lanka
South Asian Games
Silver medal – second place	2016 Guwahati–Shillong	Men's team
Silver medal – second place	2019 Kathmandu–Pokhara	Men's team
Silver medal – second place	2019 Kathmandu–Pokhara	Men's doubles
Bronze medal – third place	2016 Guwahati–Shillong	Men's doubles
Bronze medal – third place	2016 Guwahati–Shillong	Mixed doubles

Buwenaka Tharindu Dullewa Dumbukola Goonathileka (born 8 May 1996) is a Sri Lankan badminton player. He competed at the 2016 and 2019 South Asian Games and won three silver and two bronze medals.

== Career ==
Goonethilleka partnered with Sachin Dias and won a bronze medal at the 2016 South Asian Games. They reached the semifinals in the 2018 Commonwealth Games but lost the bronze medal match to Goh V Shem and Tan Wee Kiong. He also won silver in the 2019 edition of the Games in Kathmandu–Pokhara.

In 2021, Goonethilleka won the men's doubles at the Bangladesh International. He later represented the Sri Lankan team at the 2022 Commonwealth Games.

== Achievements ==
=== South Asian Games ===
Men's doubles
Year	Venue	Partner	Opponent	Score	Result
2016	Multipurpose Hall SAI–SAG Centre; Shillong, India	(Sri Lanka) Sachin Dias	(India) Manu Attri (India) B. Sumeeth Reddy	12–21, 11–21	Bronze
2019	Badminton Covered Hall; Pokhara, Nepal	(Sri Lanka) Sachin Dias	(India) Krishna Prasad Garaga (India) Dhruv Kapila	19–21, 21–19, 18–21	Silver

Mixed doubles
Year	Venue	Partner	Opponent	Score	Result
2016	Multipurpose Hall SAI–SAG Centre; Shillong, India	(Sri Lanka) Kavidi Sirimannage	(India) Manu Attri (India) Ashwini Ponnappa	17–21, 14–21	Bronze

=== BWF International Challenge/Series (1 title, 1 runner-up) ===
Men's singles
Year	Tournament	Opponent	Score	Result
2025	Sri Lanka International	(Indonesia) Jelang Fajar	18–21, 13–21	(silver) Runner-up

Men's doubles
Year	Tournament	Partner	Opponent	Score	Result
2021	Bangladesh International	(Sri Lanka) Sachin Dias	(India) Bokka Navaneeth (India) S S K Podile	21–15, 21–9	(gold) Winner

BWF International Challenge tournament
BWF International Series tournament
