= Badminton at the 2022 Commonwealth Games – Mixed team =

Badminton – Mixed team at the 2022 Commonwealth Games
- Venue: National Exhibition Centre
- Dates: 29 July – 2 August 2022
- Nations: 16

Medalists
gold medal	Malaysia
silver medal	India
bronze medal	Singapore

The mixed team badminton event at the 2022 Commonwealth Games was held from 29 July to 2 August at the National Exhibition Centre in Solihull.

== Schedule ==
All times based on British Summer Time (UTC+01:00)

Date	Time	Phase
29–30 July	09:00	Group stage
29–30 July	14:00	Group stage
29–30 July	19:00	Group stage
31 July	11:00	Quarter-finals
31 July	17:30	Quarter-finals
1 August	11:00	Semi-finals
1 August	17:30	Semi-finals
2 August	11:00	Bronze medal game
2 August	17:30	Gold medal game

== Qualification ==
Sixteen nations are also entitled to contest the mixed team event; subject to at least four CGF regions being represented and a minimum entry of two men / two women per team, they qualify as follows:

- The host nation.
- The top fourteen nations in the BWF World Ranking as of 1 February 2022, excluding the host nation. Their highest-ranked players in each of the five individual rankings are added together to determine the combined ranking.
- One nation not already qualified receives a CGF/BWF Bipartite Invitation.

Means of qualification	Date	Quotas	Qualified
Host Nation	—N/a	1	England
BWF World Ranking	1 February 2022	14	India; Malaysia; Canada; Singapore; Scotland; Australia; ~~Nigeria~~ (Note: Quota place declined and reallocated to next team in the rankings.); ~~New Zealand~~; Sri Lanka; Mauritius; South Africa; Maldives; Uganda; Jamaica; Barbados; Zambia
Bipartite Invitation	8 March 2022	1	Pakistan
TOTAL		16	

== Competition format ==
In March 2022, sixteen teams were drawn into four groups in accordance with their qualification ranking; the top two performing teams in each group advance to the knockout stage. Each tie consists of five matches, one for each discipline (men's / women's singles, men's / women's / mixed doubles).

== Group stage ==
=== Group A ===
Pos	Team	Pld	W	L	MF	MA	MD	GF	GA	GD	PF	PA	PD	Pts	Qualification
1	India	3	3	0	14	1	+13	28	2	+26	620	329	+291	3	Knockout stage
2	Sri Lanka	3	2	1	7	8	−1	14	16	−2	489	520	−31	2	Knockout stage
3	Australia	3	1	2	6	9	−3	12	18	−6	514	546	−32	1	
4	Pakistan	3	0	3	3	12	−9	6	24	−18	382	610	−228	0	

Source: BWF

India
5
National Exhibition Centre, Court 2
29 July 2022, 14:00 UTC+1

Pakistan
0

			1	2	3
1	(India) (Pakistan)	B. Sumeeth Reddy / Ashwini Ponnappa; Muhammad Irfan Saeed Bhatti / Ghazala Siddique	21; 9	21; 12
2	(India) (Pakistan)	Srikanth Kidambi; Murad Ali	21; 7	21; 12
3	(India) (Pakistan)	P. V. Sindhu; Mahoor Shahzad	21; 7	21; 6
4	(India) (Pakistan)	Satwiksairaj Rankireddy / Chirag Shetty; Murad Ali / Muhammad Irfan Saeed Bhatti	21; 12	21; 9
5	(India) (Pakistan)	Treesa Jolly / Gayatri Gopichand; Mahoor Shahzad / Ghazala Siddique	21; 4	21; 5

Australia
2
National Exhibition Centre, Court 4
29 July 2022, 14:00 UTC+1

Sri Lanka
3

			1	2	3
1	(Australia) (Sri Lanka)	Yingxiang Lin / Gronya Somerville; Sachin Dias / Thilini Hendahewa	18; 21	14; 21
2	(Australia) (Sri Lanka)	Nathan Tang; Niluka Karunaratne	18; 21	12; 21
3	(Australia) (Sri Lanka)	Chen Hsuan-yu; Suhasni Vidanage	21; 10	21; 13
4	(Australia) (Sri Lanka)	Tran Hoang Pham / Jack Yu; Sachin Dias / Niluka Karunaratne	16; 21	14; 21
5	(Australia) (Sri Lanka)	Chen Hsuan-yu / Gronya Somerville; Thilini Hendahewa / Suhasni Vidanage	21; 18	21; 14

Australia
3
National Exhibition Centre, Court 1
30 July 2022, 09:00 UTC+1

Pakistan
2

			1	2	3
1	(Australia) (Pakistan)	Jack Yu / Kaitlyn Ea; Murad Ali / Ghazala Siddique	21; 17	21; 17
2	(Australia) (Pakistan)	Jacob Schueler; Muhammad Irfan Saeed Bhatti	18; 21	16; 21
3	(Australia) (Pakistan)	Tiffany Ho; Mahoor Shahzad	18; 21	19; 21
4	(Australia) (Pakistan)	Tran Hoang Pham / Jack Yu; Murad Ali / Muhammad Irfan Saeed Bhatti	21; 11	21; 19
5	(Australia) (Pakistan)	Angela Yu / Kaitlyn Ea; Mahoor Shahzad / Ghazala Siddique	21; 11	21; 6

India
5
National Exhibition Centre, Court 3
30 July 2022, 09:00 UTC+1

Sri Lanka
0

			1	2	3
1	(India) (Sri Lanka)	Satwiksairaj Rankireddy / Ashwini Ponnappa; Sachin Dias / Thilini Hendahewa	21; 14	21; 9
2	(India) (Sri Lanka)	Lakshya Sen; Niluka Karunaratne	21; 18	21; 5
3	(India) (Sri Lanka)	Aakarshi Kashyap; Suhasni Vidanage	21; 3	21; 9
4	(India) (Sri Lanka)	Chirag Shetty / B. Sumeeth Reddy; Sachin Dias / Dumindu Abeywickrama	21; 10	21; 13
5	(India) (Sri Lanka)	Gayatri Gopichand / Treesa Jolly; Suhasni Vidanage / Thilini Hendahewa	21; 18	21; 6

India
4
National Exhibition Centre, Court 2
30 July 2022, 19:00 UTC+1

Australia
1

			1	2	3
1	(India) (Australia)	Srikanth Kidambi; Yingxiang Lin	21; 14	21; 13
2	(India) (Australia)	P. V. Sindhu; Chen Hsuan-yu	21; 10	21; 12
3	(India) (Australia)	B. Sumeeth Reddy / Chirag Shetty; Tran Hoang Pham / Jack Yu	21; 16	21; 19
4	(India) (Australia)	Treesa Jolly / Gayatri Gopichand; Chen Hsuan-yu / Gronya Somerville	13; 21	19; 21
5	(India) (Australia)	B. Sumeeth Reddy / Ashwini Ponnappa; Yingxiang Lin / Gronya Somerville	21; 14	21; 11

Sri Lanka
4
National Exhibition Centre, Court 3
30 July 2022, 19:00 UTC+1

Pakistan
1

			1	2	3
1	(Sri Lanka) (Pakistan)	Sachin Dias / Thilini Hendahewa; Muhammad Irfan Saeed Bhatti / Ghazala Siddique	21; 9	21; 11
2	(Sri Lanka) (Pakistan)	Niluka Karunaratne; Murad Ali	21; 9	21; 11
3	(Sri Lanka) (Pakistan)	Suhasni Vidanage; Mahoor Shahzad	20; 22	15; 21
4	(Sri Lanka) (Pakistan)	Sachin Dias / Niluka Karunaratne; Mahoor Shahzad / Muhammad Irfan Saeed Bhatti	21; 15	21; 13
5	(Sri Lanka) (Pakistan)	Thilini Hendahewa / Suhasni Vidanage; Murad Ali / Ghazala Siddique	21; 15	21; 8

=== Group B ===
Pos	Team	Pld	W	L	MF	MA	MD	GF	GA	GD	PF	PA	PD	Pts	Qualification
1	Singapore	3	3	0	14	1	+13	29	2	+27	639	301	+338	3	Knockout stage
2	England	3	2	1	11	4	+7	22	9	+13	577	367	+210	2	Knockout stage
3	Mauritius	3	1	2	4	11	−7	9	22	−13	386	583	−197	1	
4	Barbados	3	0	3	1	14	−13	2	29	−27	296	647	−351	0	

Source: BWF

England
5
National Exhibition Centre, Court 1
29 July 2022, 09:00 UTC+1

Barbados
0

			1	2	3
1	(England) (Barbados)	Marcus Ellis / Lauren Smith; Shae Martin / Sabrina Scott	21; 5	21; 9
2	(England) (Barbados)	Toby Penty; Kennie Maarten King	21; 5	21; 9
3	(England) (Barbados)	Freya Patel-Redfearn; Tamisha Williams	21; 6	21; 3
4	(England) (Barbados)	Ben Lane / Sean Vendy; Kennie Maarten King / Shae Martin	21; 5	21; 10
5	(England) (Barbados)	Chloe Birch / Jessica Pugh; Sabrina Scott / Tamisha Williams	21; 6	21; 9

Singapore
5
National Exhibition Centre, Court 2
29 July 2022, 09:00 UTC+1

Mauritius
0

			1	2	3
1	(Singapore) (Mauritius)	Andy Kwek / Tan Wei Han; Tejraj Pultoo / Kobita Dookhee	21; 8	21; 11
2	(Singapore) (Mauritius)	Yeo Jia Min; Jemimah Leung	21; 2	21; 2
3	(Singapore) (Mauritius)	Loh Kean Yew; Julien Paul	21; 10	21; 12
4	(Singapore) (Mauritius)	Crystal Wong / Jin Yujia; Kobita Dookhee / Lorna Bodha	21; 8	21; 6
5	(Singapore) (Mauritius)	Terry Hee / Loh Kean Hean; Alexandre Bongout / Tejraj Pultoo	21; 9	21; 10

England
5
National Exhibition Centre, Court 2
29 July 2022, 19:00 UTC+1

Mauritius
0

			1	2	3
1	(England) (Mauritius)	Callum Hemming / Jessica Pugh; Aatish Lubah / Lorna Bodha	21; 1	21; 13
2	(England) (Mauritius)	Toby Penty; Julien Paul	21; 14	21; 7
3	(England) (Mauritius)	Ben Lane / Sean Vendy; Tejraj Pultoo / Alexandre Bongout	21; 9	21; 9
4	(England) (Mauritius)	Freya Patel-Redfearn; Ganesha Mungrah	21; 9	21; 7
5	(England) (Mauritius)	Lauren Smith / Chloe Birch; Kobita Dookhee / Lorna Bodha	21; 4	21; 8

Singapore
5
National Exhibition Centre, Court 3
29 July 2022, 19:00 UTC+1

Barbados
0

			1	2	3
1	(Singapore) (Barbados)	Terry Hee / Tan Wei Han; Shae Martin / Tamisha Williams	21; 5	21; 10
2	(Singapore) (Barbados)	Jason Teh; Kennie Maarten King	21; 9	21; 7
3	(Singapore) (Barbados)	Insyirah Khan; Sabrina Scott	21; 1	21; 4
4	(Singapore) (Barbados)	Loh Kean Hean / Andy Kwek; Kennie Maarten King / Shae Martin	21; 6	21; 10
5	(Singapore) (Barbados)	Crystal Wong / Jin Yujia; Tamisha Williams / Sabrina Scott	21; 5	21; 9

England
1
National Exhibition Centre, Court 1
30 July 2022, 14:00 UTC+1

Singapore
4

			1	2	3
1	(England) (Singapore)	Marcus Ellis / Lauren Smith; Terry Hee / Tan Wei Han	9; 21	15; 21
2	(England) (Singapore)	Toby Penty; Loh Kean Yew	12; 21	12; 21
3	(England) (Singapore)	Freya Patel-Redfearn; Yeo Jia Min	4; 21	8; 21
4	(England) (Singapore)	Ben Lane / Sean Vendy; Terry Hee / Loh Kean Hean	19; 21	21; 12	21; 18
5	(England) (Singapore)	Chloe Birch / Lauren Smith; Jin Yujia / Crystal Wong	19; 21	17; 21

Mauritius
4
National Exhibition Centre, Court 4
30 July 2022, 14:00 UTC+1

Barbados
1

			1	2	3
1	(Mauritius) (Barbados)	Tejraj Pultoo / Kobita Dookhee; Shae Martin / Sabrina Scott	17; 21	21; 16	19; 21
2	(Mauritius) (Barbados)	Alexandre Bongout; Kennie Maarten King	23; 21	21; 18
3	(Mauritius) (Barbados)	Aatish Lubah / Julien Paul; Kennie Maarten King / Shae Martin	21; 6	21; 15
4	(Mauritius) (Barbados)	Lorna Bodha; Tamisha Williams	21; 11	21; 12
5	(Mauritius) (Barbados)	Lorna Bodha / Kobita Dookhee; Sabrina Scott / Tamisha Williams	21; 14	21; 8

=== Group C ===
Pos	Team	Pld	W	L	MF	MA	MD	GF	GA	GD	PF	PA	PD	Pts	Qualification
1	Canada	3	3	0	13	2	+11	26	4	+22	610	319	+291	3	Knockout stage
2	Scotland	3	2	1	11	4	+7	22	8	+14	562	365	+197	2	Knockout stage
3	Uganda	3	1	2	5	10	−5	11	21	−10	416	597	−181	1	
4	Maldives	3	0	3	1	14	−13	3	29	−26	344	651	−307	0	

Source: BWF

Scotland
5
National Exhibition Centre, Court 1
29 July 2022, 14:00 UTC+1

Maldives
0

			1	2	3
1	(Scotland) (Maldives)	Kirsty Gilmour; Aminath Nabeeha Abdul Razzaq	21; 4	21; 10
2	(Scotland) (Maldives)	Callum Smith; Zayan Zaki	21; 6	21; 10
3	(Scotland) (Maldives)	Eleanor O'Donnell / Ciara Torrance; Aminath Nabeeha Abdul Razzaq / Fathimath Nabaaha Abdul Razzaq	21; 12	21; 5
4	(Scotland) (Maldives)	Alexander Dunn / Matthew Grimley; Ahmed Nibal / Ajfan Rasheed	21; 12	21; 5
5	(Scotland) (Maldives)	Adam Hall / Julie MacPherson; Zayan Zaki / Fathimath Nabaaha Abdul Razzaq	21; 7	21; 6

Canada
5
National Exhibition Centre, Court 3
29 July 2022, 14:00 UTC+1

Uganda
0

			1	2	3
1	(Canada) (Uganda)	Ty Alexander Lindeman / Josephine Wu; Daniel Wanagaliya / Fadilah Mohamed Rafi	21; 13	21; 5
2	(Canada) (Uganda)	Brian Yang; Brian Kasirye	21; 12	21; 14
3	(Canada) (Uganda)	Michelle Li; Husina Kobugabe	21; 8	21; 8
4	(Canada) (Uganda)	Adam Dong / Nyl Yakura; Brian Kasirye / Daniel Wanagaliya	21; 2	21; 9
5	(Canada) (Uganda)	Rachel Honderich / Kristen Tsai; Husina Kobugabe / Fadilah Mohamed Rafi	21; 6	21; 10

Canada
5
National Exhibition Centre, Court 2
30 July 2022, 09:00 UTC+1

Maldives
0

			1	2	3
1	(Canada) (Maldives)	Ty Alexander Lindeman / Josephine Wu; Ajfan Rasheed / Aminath Nabeeha Abdul Razzaq	21; 8	21; 16
2	(Canada) (Maldives)	Brian Yang; Ahmed Nibal	21; 6	21; 8
3	(Canada) (Maldives)	Michelle Li; Fathimath Nabaaha Abdul Razzaq	21; 4	21; 5
4	(Canada) (Maldives)	Adam Dong / Nyl Yakura; Ajfan Rasheed / Zayan Zaki	21; 9	21; 12
5	(Canada) (Maldives)	Kristen Tsai / Rachel Honderich; Fathimath Nabaaha Abdul Razzaq / Aminath Nabeeha Abdul Razzaq	21; 7	21; 3

Scotland
4
National Exhibition Centre, Court 4
30 July 2022, 09:00 UTC+1

Uganda
1

			1	2	3
1	(Scotland) (Uganda)	Christopher Grimley / Eleanor O'Donnell; Daniel Wanagaliya / Husina Kobugabe	21; 7	21; 7
2	(Scotland) (Uganda)	Callum Smith; Brian Kasirye	11; 21	19; 21
3	(Scotland) (Uganda)	Kirsty Gilmour; Fadilah Mohamed Rafi	21; 7	21; 11
4	(Scotland) (Uganda)	Adam Hall / Alexander Dunn; Brian Kasirye / Daniel Wanagaliya	21; 8	21; 5
5	(Scotland) (Uganda)	Ciara Torrance / Julie MacPherson; Husina Kobugabe / Tracy Naluwooza	21; 7	21; 4

Canada
3
National Exhibition Centre, Court 1
30 July 2022, 19:00 UTC+1

Scotland
2

			1	2	3
1	(Canada) (Scotland)	Ty Alexander Lindeman / Josephine Wu; Adam Hall / Julie MacPherson	12; 21	18; 21
2	(Canada) (Scotland)	Michelle Li; Kirsty Gilmour	21; 10	21; 15
3	(Canada) (Scotland)	Brian Yang; Callum Smith	21; 11	21; 9
4	(Canada) (Scotland)	Rachel Honderich / Kristen Tsai; Julie MacPherson / Ciara Torrance	21; 12	21; 13
5	(Canada) (Scotland)	Adam Dong / Nyl Yakura; Alexander Dunn / Adam Hall	16; 21	18; 21

Maldives
1
National Exhibition Centre, Court 4
30 July 2022, 19:00 UTC+1

Uganda
4

			1	2	3
1	(Maldives) (Uganda)	Zayan Zaki; Brian Kasirye	4; 21	4; 21
2	(Maldives) (Uganda)	Aminath Nabeeha Abdul Razzaq; Fadilah Mohamed Rafi	20; 22	17; 21
3	(Maldives) (Uganda)	Ahmed Nibal / Ajfan Rasheed; Brian Kasirye / Daniel Wanagaliya	14; 21	21; 14	15; 21
4	(Maldives) (Uganda)	Aminath Nabeeha Abdul Razzaq / Fathimath Nabaaha Abdul Razzaq; Husina Kobugabe / Fadilah Mohamed Rafi	17; 21	17; 21
5	(Maldives) (Uganda)	Zayan Zaki / Fathimath Nabaaha Abdul Razzaq; Daniel Wanagaliya / Husina Kobugabe	18; 21	21; 14	21; 14

=== Group D ===
Pos	Team	Pld	W	L	MF	MA	MD	GF	GA	GD	PF	PA	PD	Pts	Qualification
1	Malaysia	3	3	0	15	0	+15	30	0	+30	630	228	+402	3	Knockout stage
2	South Africa	3	2	1	7	8	−1	15	17	−2	509	540	−31	2	Knockout stage
3	Jamaica	3	1	2	6	9	−3	12	18	−6	457	546	−89	1	
4	Zambia	3	0	3	2	13	−11	5	27	−22	368	650	−282	0	

Source: BWF

South Africa
3
National Exhibition Centre, Court 3
29 July 2022, 09:00 UTC+1

Jamaica
2

			1	2	3
1	(South Africa) (Jamaica)	Jarred Elliot / Deidre Laurens Jordaan; Joel Angus / Katherine Wynter	21; 15	21; 15
2	(South Africa) (Jamaica)	Carden Kakora; Samuel Ricketts	14; 21	9; 21
3	(South Africa) (Jamaica)	Johanita Scholtz; Tahlia Richardson	21; 12	21; 16
4	(South Africa) (Jamaica)	Jarred Elliott / Robert Summers; Samuel Ricketts / Joel Angus	18; 21	17; 21
5	(South Africa) (Jamaica)	Deidre Laurens Jordaan / Johanita Scholtz; Tahlia Richardson / Katherine Wynter	21; 15	21; 16

Malaysia
5
National Exhibition Centre, Court 4
29 July 2022, 09:00 UTC+1

Zambia
0

			1	2	3
1	(Malaysia) (Zambia)	Tan Kian Meng / Lai Pei Jing; Kalombo Mulenga / Ogar Siamupangila	21; 6	21; 3
2	(Malaysia) (Zambia)	Ng Tze Yong; Chongo Mulenga	21; 9	21; 8
3	(Malaysia) (Zambia)	Goh Jin Wei; Elizaberth Chipeleme	21; 1	21; 2
4	(Malaysia) (Zambia)	Aaron Chia / Soh Wooi Yik; Kalombo Mulenga / Chongo Mulenga	21; 13	21; 9
5	(Malaysia) (Zambia)	Pearly Tan / Thinaah Muralitharan; Ogar Siamupangila / Elizaberth Chipeleme	21; 3	21; 5

Malaysia
5
National Exhibition Centre, Court 1
29 July 2022, 19:00 UTC+1

Jamaica
0

			1	2	3
1	(Malaysia) (Jamaica)	Chan Peng Soon / Cheah Yee See; Joel Angus / Katherine Wynter	21; 5	21; 12
2	(Malaysia) (Jamaica)	Ng Tze Yong; Samuel Ricketts	21; 12	21; 16
3	(Malaysia) (Jamaica)	Goh Jin Wei; Tahlia Richardson	21; 2	21; 5
4	(Malaysia) (Jamaica)	Aaron Chia / Soh Wooi Yik; Joel Angus / Samuel Ricketts	21; 7	21; 11
5	(Malaysia) (Jamaica)	Pearly Tan / Thinaah Muralitharan; Tahlia Richardson / Katherine Wynter	21; 8	21; 2

South Africa
4
National Exhibition Centre, Court 4
29 July 2022, 19:00 UTC+1

Zambia
1

			1	2	3
1	(South Africa) (Zambia)	Jarred Elliot / Deidre Laurens Jordaan; Chongo Mulenga / Ogar Siamupangila	21; 13	21; 10
2	(South Africa) (Zambia)	Carden Kakora; Kalombo Mulenga	17; 21	21; 15	21; 12
3	(South Africa) (Zambia)	Johanita Scholtz; Elizaberth Chipeleme	21; 3	21; 9
4	(South Africa) (Zambia)	Jarred Elliott / Robert Summers; Chongo Mulenga / Kalombo Mulenga	17; 21	21; 16	13; 21
5	(South Africa) (Zambia)	Deidre Laurens Jordaan / Johanita Scholtz; Elizaberth Chipeleme / Ogar Siamupangila	21; 8	21; 8

Malaysia
5
National Exhibition Centre, Court 2
30 July 2022, 14:00 UTC+1

South Africa
0

			1	2	3
1	(Malaysia) (South Africa)	Aaron Chia / Pearly Tan; Jarred Elliot / Deidre Laurens Jordaan	21; 7	21; 8
2	(Malaysia) (South Africa)	Ng Tze Yong; Carden Kakora	21; 11	21; 8
3	(Malaysia) (South Africa)	Goh Jin Wei; Johanita Scholtz	21; 5	21; 4
4	(Malaysia) (South Africa)	Tan Kian Meng / Chan Peng Soon; Jarred Elliot / Robert Summers	21; 6	21; 9
5	(Malaysia) (South Africa)	Lai Pei Jing / Cheah Yee See; Deidre Laurens Jordaan / Johanita Scholtz	21; 18	21; 13

Jamaica
4
National Exhibition Centre, Court 3
30 July 2022, 14:00 UTC+1

Zambia
1

			1	2	3
1	(Jamaica) (Zambia)	Joel Angus / Katherine Wynter; Chongo Mulenga / Ogar Siamupangila	22; 24	14; 21
2	(Jamaica) (Zambia)	Samuel Ricketts; Kalombo Mulenga	21; 15	21; 16
3	(Jamaica) (Zambia)	Tahlia Richardson; Elizaberth Chipeleme	21; 6	21; 13
4	(Jamaica) (Zambia)	Joel Angus / Samuel Ricketts; Chongo Mulenga / Kalombo Mulenga	21; 17	21; 19
5	(Jamaica) (Zambia)	Tahlia Richardson / Katherine Wynter; Ogar Siamupangila / Elizaberth Chipeleme	21; 12	21; 9

== Knockout stage ==
Quarter-finals
1	Malaysia	3
Sri Lanka	0
3	Canada	0
England	3
Scotland	0
4	Singapore	3
South Africa	0
2	India	3

Semi-finals
1	Malaysia	3
England	0
4	Singapore	0
2	India	3

Gold medal game
1	Malaysia	3
2	India	1
Bronze medal game
England	0
4	Singapore	3

=== Quarter-finals ===
Malaysia
3
National Exhibition Centre, Court 2
31 July 2022, 11:00 UTC+1

Sri Lanka
0

			1	2	3
1	(Malaysia) (Sri Lanka)	Tan Kian Meng / Lai Pei Jing; Sachin Dias / Thilini Hendahewa	21; 14	21; 14
2	(Malaysia) (Sri Lanka)	Ng Tze Yong; Niluka Karunaratne	21; 5	21; 14
3	(Malaysia) (Sri Lanka)	Goh Jin Wei; Suhasni Vidanage	21; 9	21; 5
4	(Malaysia) (Sri Lanka)	Aaron Chia / Soh Wooi Yik; Sachin Dias / Dumindu Abeywickrama				not played
5	(Malaysia) (Sri Lanka)	Pearly Tan / Thinaah Muralitharan; Suhasni Vidanage / Thilini Hendahewa				not played

Canada
0
National Exhibition Centre, Court 1
31 July 2022, 11:00 UTC+1

England
3

			1	2	3
1	(Canada) (England)	Ty Alexander Lindeman / Josephine Wu; Marcus Ellis / Lauren Smith	12; 21	9; 21
2	(Canada) (England)	Brian Yang; Toby Penty	19; 21	19; 21
3	(Canada) (England)	Adam Dong / Nyl Yakura; Ben Lane / Sean Vendy	17; 21	12; 21
4	(Canada) (England)	Michelle Li; Freya Patel-Redfearn				not played
5	(Canada) (England)	Rachel Honderich / Kristen Tsai; Chloe Birch / Lauren Smith				not played

Scotland
0
National Exhibition Centre, Court 1
31 July 2022, 17:30 UTC+1

Singapore
3

			1	2	3
1	(Scotland) (Singapore)	Adam Hall / Julie MacPherson; Terry Hee / Tan Wei Han	18; 21	17; 21
2	(Scotland) (Singapore)	Callum Smith; Loh Kean Yew	8; 21	5; 21
3	(Scotland) (Singapore)	Kirsty Gilmour; Yeo Jia Min	15; 21	21; 12	11; 21
4	(Scotland) (Singapore)	Alexander Dunn / Matthew Grimley; Terry Hee / Loh Kean Hean				not played
5	(Scotland) (Singapore)	Julie MacPherson / Ciara Torrance; Jin Yujia / Crystal Wong				not played

South Africa
0
National Exhibition Centre, Court 2
31 July 2022, 17:30 UTC+1

India
3

			1	2	3
1	(South Africa) (India)	Jarred Elliot / Deidré Laurens; B. Sumeeth Reddy / Ashwini Ponnappa	9; 21	11; 21
2	(South Africa) (India)	Carden Kakora; Lakshya Sen	5; 21	6; 21
3	(South Africa) (India)	Johanita Scholtz; Aakarshi Kashyap	11; 21	16; 21
4	(South Africa) (India)	Jarred Elliot / Robert Summers; Satwiksairaj Rankireddy / Chirag Shetty				not played
5	(South Africa) (India)	Deidré Laurens / Johanita Scholtz; Treesa Jolly / Gayatri Gopichand				not played

=== Semi-finals ===
Malaysia
3
National Exhibition Centre, Court 1
1 August 2022, 11:00 UTC+1

England
0

			1	2	3
1	(Malaysia) (England)	Chan Peng Soon / Cheah Yee See; Marcus Ellis / Lauren Smith	12; 21	21; 18	21; 13
2	(Malaysia) (England)	Ng Tze Yong; Toby Penty	21; 13	21; 14
3	(Malaysia) (England)	Aaron Chia / Soh Wooi Yik; Ben Lane / Sean Vendy	21; 17	21; 18
4	(Malaysia) (England)	Goh Jin Wei; Freya Patel-Redfearn				not played
5	(Malaysia) (England)	Pearly Tan / Thinaah Muralitharan; Chloe Birch / Lauren Smith				not played

Singapore
0
National Exhibition Centre
1 August 2022, 17:30 UTC+1

India
3

			1	2	3
1	(Singapore) (India)	Terry Hee / Andy Kwek; Satwiksairaj Rankireddy / Chirag Shetty	11; 21	12; 21
2	(Singapore) (India)	Yeo Jia Min; P. V. Sindhu	11; 21	12; 21
3	(Singapore) (India)	Loh Kean Yew; Lakshya Sen	18; 21	15; 21
4	(Singapore) (India)	Crystal Wong / Jin Yujia; Gayatri Gopichand / Treesa Jolly				not played
5	(Singapore) (India)	Terry Hee / Tan Wei Han; Satwiksairaj Rankireddy / Ashwini Ponnappa				not played

=== Bronze medal game ===
England
0
National Exhibition Centre, Court 1
2 August 2022, 11:00 UTC+1

Singapore
3

			1	2	3
1	(England) (Singapore)	Ben Lane / Lauren Smith; Terry Hee / Tan Wei Han	17; 21	23; 25
2	(England) (Singapore)	Toby Penty; Loh Kean Yew	25; 23	11; 21	23; 25
3	(England) (Singapore)	Freya Patel-Redfearn; Yeo Jia Min	18; 21	14; 21
4	(England) (Singapore)	Ben Lane / Marcus Ellis; Andy Kwek / Terry Hee				not played
5	(England) (Singapore)	Chloe Birch / Lauren Smith; Crystal Wong / Jin Yujia				not played

=== Gold medal game ===
Malaysia
3
National Exhibition Centre, Court 1
2 August 2022, 17:30 UTC+1

India
1

			1	2	3
1	(Malaysia) (India)	Aaron Chia / Soh Wooi Yik; Satwiksairaj Rankireddy / Chirag Shetty	21; 18	21; 15
2	(Malaysia) (India)	Goh Jin Wei; P. V. Sindhu	20; 22	17; 21
3	(Malaysia) (India)	Ng Tze Yong; Srikanth Kidambi	21; 19	6; 21	21; 16
4	(Malaysia) (India)	Pearly Tan / Thinaah Muralitharan; Treesa Jolly / Gayatri Gopichand	21; 18	21; 17
5	(Malaysia) (India)	Tan Kian Meng / Lai Pei Jing; Satwiksairaj Rankireddy / Ashwini Ponnappa				not played
