= Bushra Qayyum =

Pakistani badminton player (born 1995)

Personal information
- Born: 11 July 1995 (age 31) Pakistan

Sport
- Country: Pakistan
- Sport: Badminton

Singles and women's doubles
- Highest ranking: 505 (WS 16 August 2018) 366 (WD 17 March 2020)
- Current ranking: 508 (WS 16 November 2020); 366 (WD 16 November 2020)
- BWF profile
Medal record
Women's badminton
Representing Pakistan
South Asian Games
Bronze medal – third place	2019 Kathmandu-Pokhara	Women's team

Bushra Qayyum (born 11 July 1995) is a badminton player from Pakistan.

== Career ==
=== National ===
Qayyum represents WAPDA in domestic competitions including National Championships and National Games.

2020

At the 57th National Badminton Championship held in Lahore, Pakistan, Qayyum reached the semi-finals in the singles before losing to teammate, Ghazala Siddique in 2 sets (21–23, 6-21). In the team event, she helped WAPDA take the title 3–0 against SNGPL, by winning the second single against Aqsa Zikriya by 21–16, 21-13 21–13, 21–15.

=== International ===
Qayyum was part of the six-member Pakistani women's team which competed at the 2019 South Asian Games held in Kathmandu, Nepal.

=== Ranking ===
Qayyum's current international ranking is 508 in singles and 366 in doubles.

== Achievements ==
=== BWF International Challenge/Series (1 runners-up) ===
Women's doubles
Year	Tournament	Partner	Opponent	Score	Result
2019	Pakistan International	(Pakistan) Mahoor Shahzad	(Maldives) Aminath Nabeeha Abdul Razzaq (Maldives) Fathimath Nabaaha Abdul Razzaq	17–21, 13–21	(silver) Runner-up

BWF International Series tournament
