= 2017 Syed Modi International Grand Prix Gold =

Tournament details
- Dates: 24 – 29 January 2017
- Level: Grand Prix Gold
- Total prize money: US$120,000
- Venue: Babu Banarasi Das Indoor Stadium
- Location: Lucknow, India

Champions
- Men's singles: (India) Sameer Verma
- Women's singles: (India) P. V. Sindhu
- Men's doubles: (Denmark) Mathias Boe (Denmark) Carsten Mogensen
- Women's doubles: (Denmark) Kamilla Rytter Juhl (Denmark) Christinna Pedersen
- Mixed doubles: (India) Pranaav Jerry Chopra (India) N. Sikki Reddy

The 2017 Syed Modi International Grand Prix Gold was the second grand prix's badminton tournament of the 2017 BWF Grand Prix Gold and Grand Prix. The tournament was held at the Babu Banarasi Das Indoor Stadium in Lucknow, India on 24 – 29 January 2017 and had a total purse of $120,000.

== Tournament ==
The 2017 Syed Modi International Grand Prix Gold was the eighth edition of Syed Modi International Badminton Championships. This tournament has been rated as Grand Prix level since it was sanctioned by BWF in 2009. The competition has provided a great platform for some of the younger badminton players to prove their mettle against some of the best in the world. This tournament named to commemorate the 1982 Commonwealth Games champion Syed Modi. This tournament inaugurated by the Uttar Pradesh governor Ram Naik. The inaugural ceremony of the tournament presented a glittering tweet in which many international stars and dance-to-party programs.

=== Venue ===
This international tournament held at the Babu Banarasi Das Indoor Stadium, Lucknow, Uttar Pradesh, India.

=== Point distribution ===
Below is the tables with the point distribution for each phase of the tournament based on the BWF points system.

Winner	Runner-up	3/4	5/8	9/16	17/32	33/64	65/128	129/256	257/512	513/1024
7,000	5,950	4,900	3,850	2,750	1,670	660	320	130	60	30

=== Prize money ===
The total prize money for this year tournament is US$120,000.

Event	W	F
Singles	$9,000	$4,560
Doubles	$9,800	$4,560

=== Blood donation camp ===
This tournament also organized a blood donation camp in the morning session on 27 January with the help of Red Cross Society. The officers of the international umpire, coaches, officials and the U.P. Olympic Association affiliated with badminton also assist in this righteous work of blood donation.

== Men's singles ==
=== Seeds ===
1. (Thailand) Tanongsak Saensomboonsuk (withdrew)
2. (Denmark) Hans-Kristian Vittinghus (quarterfinals)
3. (India) Srikanth Kidambi (semifinals)
4. (India) Ajay Jayaram (withdrew)
5. (Denmark) Anders Antonsen (third round)
6. (India) H.S. Prannoy (third round)
7. (Malaysia) Zulfadli Zulkiffli (quarterfinals)
8. (India) Sameer Verma (champion)
9. (India) B. Sai Praneeth (final)
10. (Malaysia) Chong Wei Feng (third round)
11. (India) Sourabh Varma (quarterfinals)
12. (Denmark) Emil Holst (quarterfinals)
13. (Israel) Misha Zilberman (third round)
14. (India) Parupalli Kashyap (withdrew)
15. (India) Harsheel Dani (semifinals)
16. (India) Pratul Joshi (second round)

=== Finals ===
Quarterfinals
11	(India) Sourabh Varma	19	21	10
9	(India) B. Sai Praneeth	21	12	21
3	(India) Srikanth Kidambi	21	21
7	(Malaysia) Zulfadli Zulkiffli	12	17
15	(India) Harsheel Dani	21	17	21
12	(Denmark) Emil Holst	16	21	11
8	(India) Sameer Verma	21	21
2	(Denmark) Hans-Kristian Vittinghus	15	13

Semifinals
9	(India) B. Sai Praneeth	15	21	21
3	(India) Srikanth Kidambi	21	10	17
15	(India) Harsheel Dani	15	11
8	(India) Sameer Verma	21	21

Final
9	(India) B. Sai Praneeth	19	16
8	(India) Sameer Verma	21	21

=== Top half ===
==== Section 1 ====
First Round
PFQ	(India) A B Goparaju	10	4
(India) L Sen	21	21
PFQ	(India) V Thakran	10	13
(India) A Kumar	21	21
11	(India) S Varma	21	21
(India) R Y Chittaboina	11	17
Q2	(India) S Prajapati	21	21
(India) S Malik	13	16

Second Round
(India) L Sen	21	21
(India) A Kumar	19	10
11	(India) S Varma	21	21
Q2	(India) S Prajapati	6	10

Third Round
(India) L Sen	14	16
11	(India) S Varma	21	21

==== Section 2 ====
First Round
5	(Denmark) A Antonsen	21	21
(India) K George	9	18
(India) M Gupta	11	22	5
(Nepal) R Tamang	21	20	21
9	(India) B. S Praneeth	21	21
(India) A Joshi	14	9
(India) A B Ansari	18	19
Q8	(India) A Sharma	21	21

Second Round
5	(Denmark) A Antonsen	21	21
(Nepal) R Tamang	17	12
9	(India) B. S Praneeth	21	21
Q8	(India) A Sharma	15	10

Third Round
5	(Denmark) A Antonsen	17	19
9	(India) B. S Praneeth	21	21

==== Section 3 ====
First Round
3	(India) S Kidambi	15	21	21
(India) L Sarang	21	7	14
(Malaysia) Zh Zulkiffli	21	14	21
(India) A D Gupta	18	21	15
16	(India) P Joshi	21	21
(India) C. R Yadav	16	13
(India) A Yadav	21	21
Q7	(India) A K Repudi	16	17

Second Round
3	(India) S Kidambi	21	21
(Malaysia) Zh Zulkiffli	5	12
16	(India) P Joshi	21	16	16
(India) A Yadav	18	21	21

Third Round
3	(India) S Kidambi	21	21
(India) A Yadav	15	16

==== Section 4 ====
First Round
7	(Malaysia) Zf Zulkiffli	21	21
(India) S Rawat	15	10
(India) S Dunna	21	21
Q3	(India) K Chaubey	12	17
13	(Israel) M Zilberman	21	21
(India) S Jaiswal	15	16
(India) K G Kumar	21	10	21
(Indonesia) A Yunanto	10	21	17

Second Round
7	(Malaysia) Zf Zulkiffli	21	21
(India) S Dunna	8	11
13	(Israel) M Zilberman	17	21	22
(India) K G Kumar	21	16	20

Third Round
7	(Malaysia) Zf Zulkiffli	21	21
13	(Israel) M Zilberman	15	15

=== Bottom half ===
==== Section 5 ====
First Round
Q1	(India) A Sharma	7	9
(India) A Tandon	21	21
(India) K K Mekala	12	18
15	(India) H Dani	21	21
PFQ	(India) B Joshi	21	21
(India) A Singh	16	19
(India) N. V. S. Vijetha	11	9
6	(India) H.S. Prannoy	21	21

Second Round
(India) A Tandon	12	17
15	(India) H Dani	21	21
PFQ	(India) B Joshi	16	8
6	(India) H.S. Prannoy	21	21

Third Round
15	(India) H Dani	21	21
6	(India) H.S. Prannoy	18	18

==== Section 6 ====
First Round
(Russia) D Grachev	15	19
(India) C Sen	21	21
(India) H M.Gowda	21	11	10
12	(Denmark) E Holst	19	21	21
(India) M Manjunath	19	17
(India) S P Singh	21	21
(India) O Bansal	12	21	22
PFQ	(India) A Kulkarni	21	10	20

Second Round
(India) C Sen	13	19
12	(Denmark) E Holst	21	21
(India) S P Singh	27	21
(India) O Bansal	25	11

Third Round
12	(Denmark) E Holst	21	21
(India) S P Singh	8	11

==== Section 7 ====
First Round
(India) S Jakhar	22	14	21
Q4	(India) B Chakraborty	20	21	18
(India) H Aggarwal	11	12
10	(Malaysia) Chong W F	21	21
Q6	(India) D Kumar	15	21	12
(India) K. A Kumar	21	18	21
(India) K Jindal	1^{r}
8	(India) S Verma	5

Second Round
(India) S Jakhar	15	10
10	(Malaysia) Chong W F	21	21
(India) K. A Kumar	13	14
8	(India) S Verma	21	21

Third Round
10	(Malaysia) Chong W F	15	16
8	(India) S Verma	21	21

==== Section 8 ====
First Round
(India) A Yelegar	21	19	21
Q5	(India) A Mishra	13	21	17
(India) U Arora	21	21
PFQ	(India) S N K Adapa	16	16
(India) N Vashist	22	20	21
PFQ	(India) M Ahuja	20	22	7
(India) M Mohammed	11	12
2	(Denmark) H-K Vittinghus	21	21

Second Round
(India) A Yelegar	21	21
(India) U Arora	17	15
(India) N Vashist	14	22	7
2	(Denmark) H-K Vittinghus	21	20	21

Third Round
(India) A Yelegar	18	5
2	(Denmark) H-K Vittinghus	21	21

== Women's singles ==
=== Seeds ===
1. (India) P. V. Sindhu (champion)
2. (India) Saina Nehwal (withdrew)
3. (Spain) Beatriz Corrales (quarterfinals)
4. (Indonesia) Fitriani (semifinals)
5. (Indonesia) Dinar Dyah Ayustine (second round)
6. (Indonesia) Hanna Ramadini (semifinals)
7. (India) Ruthvika Shivani Gadde (withdrew)
8. (Russia) Ksenia Polikarpova (second round)

=== Finals ===
Semifinals
1	(India) P. V. Sindhu	21	21
4	(Indonesia) Fitriani	11	19
(Indonesia) Gregoria Mariska Tunjung	21	21
6	(Indonesia) Hanna Ramadini	19	14

Final
1	(India) P. V. Sindhu	21	21
(Indonesia) Gregoria Mariska Tunjung	13	14

=== Top half ===
==== Section 1 ====
First Round
1	(India) P. V. Sindhu	21	21
(India) A Prabhudesai	9	11
(India) L Dahiya	21	20	21
(Egypt) H Hosny	6	22	13
PFQ	(India) S Panchal	8	9
PFQ	(India) S Toshniwal	21	21
Q1	(India) V Choudhari	21	21
PFQ	(India) P Mudaliar	14	10

Second Round
1	(India) P. V. Sindhu	21	21
(India) L Dahiya	7	12
PFQ	(India) S Toshniwal	13	12
Q1	(India) V Choudhari	21	21

Quarterfinals
1	(India) P. V. Sindhu	21	21
Q1	(India) V Choudhari	15	11

==== Section 2 ====
First Round
4	(Indonesia) Fitriani	14	21	21
(India) R Raje	21	12	7
(India) I Sharma	21	16	21
Q3	(India) A S Sisodiya	18	21	19
8	(Russia) K Polikarpova	21	21
(India) R Pillai	12	11
(Nepal) N Tamang	5	6
(India) R Das	21	21

Second Round
4	(Indonesia) Fitriani	21	21
(India) I Sharma	11	7
8	(Russia) K Polikarpova	12	19
(India) R Das	21	21

Quarterfinals
4	(Indonesia) Fitriani	21	13	23
(India) R Das	17	21	21

=== Bottom half ===
==== Section 3 ====
First Round
(Indonesia) G M Tunjung	21	21
(India) P Shreyanshi	7	14
(India) M Riya	18	14
5	(Indonesia) D D Ayustine	21	21
(Indonesia) V D Rumete	8	21	21
(India) S U R Chukka	21	15	12
(India) R Karthik	17	13
3	(Spain) B Corrales	21	21

Second Round
(Indonesia) G M Tunjung	12	21	21
5	(Indonesia) D D Ayustine	21	13	17
(Indonesia) V D Rumete	13	13
3	(Spain) B Corrales	21	21

Quarterfinals
(Indonesia) G M Tunjung	21	21
3	(Spain) B Corrales	9	11

==== Section 4 ====
First Round
Q4	(India) D Gupta	17	16
(India) A Kashyap	21	21
(India) P Konadam	9	6
6	(Indonesia) H Ramadini	21	21
Q2	(India) G Asaji	12	5
(India) S K P Kudaravalli	21	21
(India) M Agrey	21	21
PFQ	(Nepal) A Giri	2	6

Second Round
(India) A Kashyap	16	12
6	(Indonesia) H Ramadini	21	21
(India) S K P Kudaravalli	23	21
(India) M Agrey	21	19

Quarterfinals
6	(Indonesia) H Ramadini	21	21
(India) S K P Kudaravalli	17	15

== Men's doubles ==
=== Seeds ===
1. (Denmark) Mathias Boe / Carsten Mogensen (champion)
2. (Denmark) Mathias Christiansen / David Daugaard (quarterfinals)
3. (India) Manu Attri / B. Sumeeth Reddy (second round)
4. (Indonesia) Fajar Alfian / Muhammad Rian Ardianto (semifinals)
5. (Indonesia) Hendra Setiawan / (Malaysia) Tan Boon Heong (quarterfinals)
6. (Singapore) Danny Bawa Chrisnanta / Hendra Wijaya (quarterfinals)
7. (Indonesia) Berry Angriawan / Hardianto (semifinals)
8. (Chinese Taipei) Lu Ching-yao / Yang Po-han (final)

=== Finals ===
Semifinals
1	(Denmark) Mathias Boe (Denmark) Carsten Mogensen	11	21	21
4	(Indonesia) Fajar Alfian (Indonesia) Muhammad Rian Ardianto	21	17	19
8	(Chinese Taipei) Lu Ching-yao (Chinese Taipei) Yang Po-han	21	21
7	(Indonesia) Berry Angriawan (Indonesia) Hardianto	16	17

Final
1	(Denmark) Mathias Boe (Denmark) Carsten Mogensen	21	21
8	(Chinese Taipei) Lu Ching-yao (Chinese Taipei) Yang Po-han	14	15

=== Top half ===
==== Section 1 ====
First Round
1	(Denmark) M Boe (Denmark) C Mogensen	22	21	21
(India) S Rankireddy (India) C Shetty	24	14	14
(India) H Malik (India) S Malik	w	/	o
(Nepal) D Dhami (Nepal) R Tamang
5	(Indonesia) H Setiawan (Malaysia) Tan B H	21	21
(India) M Mohammed (India) V Rajendran	11	9
Q1	(India) R Mali (India) R K Navaneethakrishnan	10	16
(India) A Francis (India) T Kona	21	21

Second Round
1	(Denmark) M Boe (Denmark) C Mogensen	21	21
(India) H Malik (India) S Malik	9	8
5	(Indonesia) H Setiawan (Malaysia) Tan B H	21	21
(India) A Francis (India) T Kona	11	15

Quarterfinals
1	(Denmark) M Boe (Denmark) C Mogensen	25	21	21
5	(Indonesia) H Setiawan (Malaysia) Tan B H	27	10	11

==== Section 2 ====
First Round
4	(Indonesia) F Alfian (Indonesia) M R Ardianto	21	21
(India) Arjun M.R. (India) R Shlok	19	18
(Belgium) M Dierickx (Belgium) F Golinski	w	/	o
(India) B N Geetha (India) S. Sunjith
6	(Singapore) D B Chrisnanta (Singapore) H Wijaya	21	21
(India) M. A Raju (India) V G Prasad	4	9
Q3	(India) V Chawat (India) P S Chouhan	14	12
(India) K. Nandagopal (India) S Shukla	21	21

Second Round
4	(Indonesia) F Alfian (Indonesia) M R Ardianto	14
(Belgium) M Dierickx (Belgium) F Golinski	6^{r}
6	(Singapore) D B Chrisnanta (Singapore) H Wijaya	21	18	21
(India) K. Nandagopal (India) S Shukla	10	21	18

Quarterfinals
4	(Indonesia) F Alfian (Indonesia) M R Ardianto	21	21
6	(Singapore) D B Chrisnanta (Singapore) H Wijaya	15	19

=== Bottom half ===
==== Section 3 ====
First Round
(Russia) E Dremin (Russia) D Grachev	21	21
(India) J Sanyal (India) S Sharma	19	19
(India) V Prasad (India) J Yadav	9	14
8	(Chinese Taipei) Lu C-y (Chinese Taipei) Yang P-h	21	21
(India) U Arora (India) G Deswal	16	13
(Malaysia) M A Abdul Latif (Malaysia) Lim K W	21	21
(Singapore) Terry Hee Y K (Singapore) Loh K H	21	23	14
3	(India) M Attri (India) B. S Reddy	15	25	21

Second Round
(Russia) E Dremin (Russia) D Grachev	16	7
8	(Chinese Taipei) Lu C-y (Chinese Taipei) Yang P-h	21	21
(Malaysia) M A Abdul Latif (Malaysia) Lim K W	21	17	21
3	(India) M Attri (India) B. S Reddy	15	21	17

Quarterfinals
8	(Chinese Taipei) Lu C-y (Chinese Taipei) Yang P-h	15	21	21
(Malaysia) M A Abdul Latif (Malaysia) Lim K W	21	14	11

==== Section 4 ====
First Round
(India) V Devlekar (India) S Sharma	21	21
Q2	(India) K Chaudhary (India) C Tripathi	15	5
(India) A George (India) R Kapoor	15	17
7	(Indonesia) B Angriawan (Indonesia) Hardianto	21	21
Q4	(India) R Raturi (India) M Tiwari	11	18
(India) B Chakraborty (India) T Gill	21	21
(India) K P Garaga (India) D Kapila	18	14
2	(Denmark) M Christiansen (Denmark) D Daugaard	21	21

Second Round
(India) V Devlekar (India) S Sharma	15	8
7	(Indonesia) B Angriawan (Indonesia) Hardianto	21	21
(India) B Chakraborty (India) T Gill	7	8
2	(Denmark) M Christiansen (Denmark) D Daugaard	21	21

Quarterfinals
7	(Indonesia) B Angriawan (Indonesia) Hardianto	21	21
2	(Denmark) M Christiansen (Denmark) D Daugaard	16	14

== Women's doubles ==
=== Seeds ===
1. (Denmark) Kamilla Rytter Juhl / Christinna Pedersen (champion)
2. (Malaysia) Chow Mei Kuan / Lee Meng Yean (quarterfinals)
3. (Malaysia) Lim Yin Loo / Yap Cheng Wen (semifinals)
4. (India) Meghana Jakkampudi / Poorvisha S Ram (quarterfinals)

=== Finals ===
Semifinals
1	(Denmark) Kamilla Rytter Juhl (Denmark) Christinna Pedersen	23	21
3	(Malaysia) Lim Yin Loo (Malaysia) Yap Cheng Wen	21	14
(India) Sanjana Santosh (India) Arathi Sara Sunil	21	12	13
(India) Ashwini Ponnappa (India) N. Sikki Reddy	18	21	21

Final
1	(Denmark) Kamilla Rytter Juhl (Denmark) Christinna Pedersen	21	21
(India) Ashwini Ponnappa (India) N. Sikki Reddy	16	18

=== Top half ===
==== Section 1 ====
First Round
1	(Denmark) K Rytter Juhl (Denmark) C Pedersen
BYE
(Nepal) S Shrestha (Nepal) N Tamang	w	/	o
(India) K Kanwal (India) T Samantaray	w	/	o
(India) P Karki (India) Y Taring	10	15
(India) A Balan (India) P Sawant	21	21
(India) B V R T Bailupudi (India) Ch. Poornima
(India) J Dewangan (India) A Kashyap	w	/	o

Second Round
1	(Denmark) K Rytter Juhl (Denmark) C Pedersen
BYE
(India) A Balan (India) P Sawant	21	16	21
(India) J Dewangan (India) A Kashyap	13	21	11

Quarterfinals
1	(Denmark) K Rytter Juhl (Denmark) C Pedersen	w	/	o
(India) A Balan (India) P Sawant

==== Section 2 ====
First Round
3	(Malaysia) Lim Y L (Malaysia) Yap C W
BYE
(India) K Antil (India) L Dahiya	13	13
(India) P Rai (India) A S Sisodiya	21	21
(India) A Parikh (India) H Veludurthi	21	21
(India) N Patel (India) S Sharma	18	17
(India) R Pillai (India) M Sahdev	13	17
(India) Sruthi K.P (India) H M Harinarayanan	21	21

Second Round
3	(Malaysia) Lim Y L (Malaysia) Yap C W	21	21
(India) P Rai (India) A S Sisodiya	7	7
(India) A Parikh (India) H Veludurthi	20	21	12
(India) Sruthi K.P (India) H M Harinarayanan	22	14	21

Quarterfinals
3	(Malaysia) Lim Y L (Malaysia) Yap C W	21	21
(India) Sruthi K.P (India) H M Harinarayanan	17	9

=== Bottom half ===
==== Section 3 ====
First Round
(Indonesia) C S Ayunidha (Indonesia) D R Vehrenica	13	14
(India) K Garg (India) N B Hazarika	21	21
(India) S Santosh (India) A S Sunil	21	21
(India) M Riya (India) K Wadkar	14	15
(India) R Anand (India) R Jaiswal	4	8
(India) D Choudhary (India) D Gupta	21	21
BYE
4	(India) M Jakkampudi (India) P S Ram

Second Round
(India) K Garg (India) N B Hazarika	21	14	14
(India) S Santosh (India) A S Sunil	19	21	21
(India) D Choudhary (India) D Gupta	16	10
4	(India) M Jakkampudi (India) P S Ram	21	21

Quarterfinals
(India) S Santosh (India) A S Sunil	12	21	21
4	(India) M Jakkampudi (India) P S Ram	21	12	9

==== Section 4 ====
First Round
(India) D Hazarika (India) S Saikia	21	21
(India) S Chowdhary (India) A Goel	17	14
(India) J. A Kowser (India) P Vaddepally	8	3
(India) A Ponnappa (India) N. S Reddy	21	21
(India) F Mather (India) A Roy	12	15
(India) M Aggarwal (India) K. Maneesha	21	21
BYE
2	(Malaysia) Chow M K (Malaysia) Lee M Y

Second Round
(India) D Hazarika (India) S Saikia	7	10
(India) A Ponnappa (India) N. S Reddy	21	21
(India) M Aggarwal (India) K. Maneesha	19	15
2	(Malaysia) Chow M K (Malaysia) Lee M Y	21	21

Quarterfinals
(India) A Ponnappa (India) N. S Reddy	21	21
2	(Malaysia) Chow M K (Malaysia) Lee M Y	14	18

== Mixed doubles ==
=== Seeds ===
1. (Denmark) Joachim Fischer Nielsen / Christinna Pedersen (semifinals)
2. (India) Pranaav Jerry Chopra / N. Sikki Reddy (champion)
3. (Singapore) Terry Hee Yong Kai / Tan Wei Han (quarterfinals)
4. (Russia) Evgenij Dremin / Evgenia Dimova (quarterfinals)
5. (Denmark) Mathias Christiansen / Sara Thygesen (semifinals)
6. (Malaysia) Goh Soon Huat / Shevon Jemie Lai (quarterfinals)
7. (India) B. Sumeeth Reddy / Ashwini Ponnappa (final)
8. (Malaysia) Yogendran Khrishnan / (India) Prajakta Sawant (quarterfinals)

=== Finals ===
Semifinals
1	(Denmark) Joachim Fischer Nielsen (Denmark) Christinna Pedersen	21	18	18
7	(India) B. Sumeeth Reddy (India) Ashwini Ponnappa	19	21	21
5	(Denmark) Mathias Christiansen (Denmark) Sara Thygesen	18	13
2	(India) Pranaav Jerry Chopra (India) N. Sikki Reddy	21	21

Final
7	(India) B. Sumeeth Reddy (India) Ashwini Ponnappa	20	10
2	(India) Pranaav Jerry Chopra (India) N. Sikki Reddy	22	21

=== Top half ===
==== Section 1 ====
First Round
1	(Denmark) J Fischer Nielsen (Denmark) C Pedersen	21	21
(India) M R Raju (India) J. A Kowsar	5	8
(India) A S Bishen (India) P Naqvi	5	15
(India) V G Prasad (India) J Dewangan	21	21
6	(Malaysia) Goh S H (Malaysia) S J Lai	21	21
(India) D Chaudhry (India) L Dahiya	6	8
(India) K. Nandagopal (India) M Aggarwal	21	21
(Nepal) R Tamang (Nepal) N Tamang	13	13

Second Round
1	(Denmark) J Fischer Nielsen (Denmark) C Pedersen	21	21
(India) V G Prasad (India) J Dewangan	8	13
6	(Malaysia) Goh S H (Malaysia) S J Lai	16	22	21
(India) K. Nandagopal (India) M Aggarwal	21	20	16

Quarterfinals
1	(Denmark) J Fischer Nielsen (Denmark) C Pedersen	21	21
6	(Malaysia) Goh S H (Malaysia) S J Lai	15	11

==== Section 2 ====
First Round
3	(Singapore) Terry Hee Y K (Singapore) Tan W H	2
(India) A Nair (India) D Choudhary	0^{r}
(India) R Mali (India) S Panchal	16	24
Q1	(India) O Awate (India) N Patel	21	26
7	(India) B. S Reddy (India) A Ponnappa	21	21
(India) V Thakran (India) R Sahdev	6	8
(India) R Kapoor (India) S Santhosh	21	21
Q4	(India) D Kapila (India) M Jakkampudi	18	15

Second Round
3	(Singapore) Terry Hee Y K (Singapore) Tan W H	21	21
Q1	(India) O Awate (India) N Patel	15	14
7	(India) B. S Reddy (India) A Ponnappa	21	21
(India) R Kapoor (India) S Santhosh	15	18

Quarterfinals
3	(Singapore) Terry Hee Y K (Singapore) Tan W H	18	21
7	(India) B. S Reddy (India) A Ponnappa	21	23

=== Bottom half ===
==== Section 3 ====
First Round
(Indonesia) H Tandjaya (Indonesia) C S Ayunidha	13	15
(India) S Sharma (India) A Parikh	21	21
(India) S. Sunjith (India) Sruthi K.P.	8	14
5	(Denmark) M Christiansen (Denmark) S Thygesen	21	21
(Nepal) D Dhami (Nepal) A Guru
(India) V Devlekar (India) K Garg	w	/	o
(India) S Rankireddy (India) K. Maneesha	21	16
4	(Russia) E Dremin (Russia) E Dimova	23	21

Second Round
(India) S Sharma (India) A Parikh	8	17
5	(Denmark) M Christiansen (Denmark) S Thygesen	21	21
(India) V Devlekar (India) K Garg	7	16
4	(Russia) E Dremin (Russia) E Dimova	21	21

Quarterfinals
5	(Denmark) M Christiansen (Denmark) S Thygesen	15	21	21
4	(Russia) E Dremin (Russia) E Dimova	21	10	15

==== Section 4 ====
First Round
Q3	(India) T Sharma (India) T Samantharay	23	21
(India) G Deswal (India) G Asaji	21	12
(India) K Sharma (India) J Nashier	13	21	11
8	(Malaysia) Y Khrishnan (India) P Sawant	21	17	21
Q2	(India) K Chahal (India) M Sahdev	21	21
(India) B V R T Bailupudi (India) R K Navaneethakrishnan	19	12
PFQ	(Indonesia) A Yunanto (Indonesia) D R Vehrenica	7	18
2	(India) P J Chopra (India) N. S Reddy	21	21

Second Round
Q3	(India) T Sharma (India) T Samantharay	15	22	16
8	(Malaysia) Y Khrishnan (India) P Sawant	21	20	21
Q2	(India) K Chahal (India) M Sahdev	16	15
2	(India) P J Chopra (India) N. S Reddy	21	21

Quarterfinals
8	(Malaysia) Y Khrishnan (India) P Sawant	16	19
2	(India) P J Chopra (India) N. S Reddy	21	21

Preceded by 2017 Malaysia Masters Grand Prix Gold	BWF Grand Prix Gold and Grand Prix; 2017 BWF Season	Succeeded by 2017 Thailand Masters Grand Prix Gold
