= Sidra Hamad =

Pakistani badminton player (born 1986)

Personal information
- Born: 3 December 1986 (age 39)

Sport
- Country: Pakistan
- Sport: Badminton

Women's singles & doubles
- Highest ranking: 570 (WS 27 October 2016); 368 (WD 3 Nov 2016)
- BWF profile
Medal record
Women's badminton
Representing Pakistan
South Asian Games
Bronze medal – third place	2016 Guwahati-Shillong	Women's doubles

Sidra Hamad (born 3 December 1986) is a Pakistani badminton player. She was the bronze medalist at the 2016 South Asian Games in the women's doubles event, and the runner-up at the Pakistan International tournament the same year.

== Achievements ==
=== South Asian Games ===
Women's doubles
Year	Venue	Partner	Opponent	Score	Result
2016	Multipurpose Hall SAI–SAG Centre; Shillong, India	(Pakistan) Khizra Rasheed	(India) Jwala Gutta (India) Ashwini Ponnappa	9–21, 3–21	Bronze

=== BWF International Challenge/Series ===
Women's doubles
Year	Tournament	Partner	Opponent	Score	Result
2016	Pakistan International	(Pakistan) Khizra Rasheed	(Pakistan) Palwasha Bashir (Pakistan) Saima Manzoor	21–13, 11–21, 16–21	(silver) Runner-up

BWF International Challenge tournament
BWF International Series tournament
BWF Future Series tournament
