= Sachin Dias =

Sri Lankan badminton player (born 1996)

Personal information
- Born: 18 July 1996 (age 30) Sri Jayawardenepura Kotte, Sri Lanka
- Years active: 2012–present
- Height: 1.81 m (5 ft 11 in)

Sport
- Country: Sri Lanka
- Sport: Badminton
- Handedness: Right

Men's and mixed doubles
- Highest ranking: 72 (MD with Buwaneka Goonethilleka, 15 November 2022); 89 (XD with Kavidi Sirimannage, 15 November 2022)
- BWF profile
Medal record
Men's badminton
Representing Sri Lanka
South Asian Games
Silver medal – second place	2016 Guwahati–Shillong	Men's team
Silver medal – second place	2019 Kathmandu–Pokhara	Men's team
Silver medal – second place	2019 Kathmandu–Pokhara	Men's doubles
Silver medal – second place	2019 Kathmandu–Pokhara	Mixed doubles
Bronze medal – third place	2016 Guwahati–Shillong	Men's singles
Bronze medal – third place	2016 Guwahati–Shillong	Men's doubles
Representing (International Olympic Committee) Mixed-NOCs
Youth Olympic Games
Bronze medal – third place	2014 Nanjing	Mixed doubles

Sachin Premashan Dias Angodavidanalage (born 18 July 1996) is a Sri Lankan badminton player. He won two silver medals and a bronze in singles and doubles at the South Asian Games. He studied at the St. Sebastian's College, Moratuwa

== Career ==
In his junior stage, Dias participated the 2014 Youth Olympic Games in Nanjing, China. He won a bronze medal in the mixed doubles discipline partnered with He Bingjiao.

He later transitioned from singles to doubles. He partnered with Buwaneka Goonethilleka and won a bronze medal at the 2016 South Asian Games. They reached the semifinals in the 2018 Commonwealth Games but lost the bronze medal match to Goh V Shem and Tan Wee Kiong. They also won silver in the 2019 edition of the Games in Kathmandu.

In 2021, he won two titles at the Bangladesh International, with Goonethilleka in men's doubles and Kavidi Sirimannage in mixed doubles.

In 2022, he and his partner, Thilini Hendahewa won Sri Lanka's first ever BWF World Tour title at the 2022 Odisha Open in the mixed doubles discipline. He later represented the Sri Lankan team at the 2022 Commonwealth Games.

== Achievements ==
=== Youth Olympic Games ===
Mixed doubles
Year	Venue	Partner	Opponent	Score	Result
2014	Nanjing Sport Institute; Nanjing, China	(China) He Bingjiao	(Thailand) Mek Narongrit (China) Qin Jinjing	21–16, 21–18	Bronze

=== South Asian Games ===
Men's singles
Year	Venue	Opponent	Score	Result
2016	Multipurpose Hall SAI–SAG Centre, Shillong, India	(India) Prannoy H. S.	13–21, 16–21	Bronze

Men's doubles
Year	Venue	Partner	Opponent	Score	Result
2019	Badminton Covered Hall; Pokhara, Nepal	(Sri Lanka) Buwaneka Goonethilleka	(India) Krishna Prasad Garaga (India) Dhruv Kapila	19–21, 21–19, 18–21	Silver
2016	Multipurpose Hall SAI–SAG Centre; Shillong, India	(Sri Lanka) Buwaneka Goonethilleka	(India) Manu Attri (India) B. Sumeeth Reddy	12–21, 11–21	Bronze

Mixed doubles
Year	Venue	Partner	Opponent	Score	Result
2019	Badminton Covered Hall; Pokhara, Nepal	(Sri Lanka) Thilini Hendahewa	(India) Dhruv Kapila (India) Meghana Jakkampudi	16–21, 14–21	Silver

=== BWF World Tour (1 title) ===
The BWF World Tour, which was announced on 19 March 2017 and implemented in 2018, is a series of elite badminton tournaments sanctioned by the Badminton World Federation (BWF). The BWF World Tours are divided into levels of World Tour Finals, Super 1000, Super 750, Super 500, Super 300 (part of the HSBC World Tour), and the BWF Tour Super 100.

Mixed doubles
Year	Tournament	Level	Partner	Opponent	Score	Result
2022	Odisha Open	Super 100	(Sri Lanka) Thilini Hendahewa	(India) Arjun M. R. (India) Treesa Jolly	21–16, 22–20	(gold) Winner

=== BWF International Challenge/Series (2 titles) ===
Men's doubles
Year	Tournament	Partner	Opponent	Score	Result
2021	Bangladesh International	(Sri Lanka) Buwaneka Goonethilleka	(India) Bokka Navaneeth (India) S S K Podile	21–15, 21–9	(gold) Winner

Mixed doubles
Year	Tournament	Partner	Opponent	Score	Result
2021	Bangladesh International	(Sri Lanka) Kavidi Sirimannage	(India) Pratik Ranade (India) Akshaya Warang	21–15, 21–18	(gold) Winner

BWF International Challenge tournament
BWF International Series tournament
