= Khizra Rasheed =

Pakistani badminton player (born 1988)

Personal information
- Born: 24 February 1988 (age 38)

Sport
- Country: Pakistan
- Sport: Badminton

Women's singles & doubles
- Highest ranking: 476 (WS 27 October 2016); 368 (WD 3 November 2016); 791 (XD 17 December 2019)
- BWF profile
Medal record
Women's badminton
Representing Pakistan
South Asian Games
Bronze medal – third place	2016 Guwahati-Shillong	Women's doubles

Khizra Rasheed (born 24 February 1988) is a Pakistani badminton player. She was the bronze medalist at the 2016 South Asian Games in the women's doubles event, and the champion at the 2017 Pakistan International tournament.

== Achievements ==
=== South Asian Games ===
Women's doubles
Year	Venue	Partner	Opponent	Score	Result
2016	Multipurpose Hall SAI–SAG Centre; Shillong, India	(Pakistan) Sidra Hamad	(India) Jwala Gutta (India) Ashwini Ponnappa	9–21, 3–21	Bronze

=== BWF International Challenge/Series ===
Women's doubles
Year	Tournament	Partner	Opponent	Score	Result
2017	Pakistan International	(Pakistan) Palwasha Bashir	(Pakistan) Sehra Akram (Pakistan) Huma Javeed	21–12, 21–11	(gold) Winner
2016	Pakistan International	(Pakistan) Sidra Hamad	(Pakistan) Palwasha Bashir (Pakistan) Saima Manzoor	21–13, 11–21, 16–21	(silver) Runner-up

BWF International Challenge tournament
BWF International Series tournament
BWF Future Series tournament
