= Kavidi Sirimannage =

Sri Lankan badminton player (born 1995)

Personal information
- Born: Kavidi Ishadika Sirimannage; 27 September 1995 (age 31) Colombo, Sri Lanka
- Height: 1.60 m (5 ft 3 in)
- Weight: 55 kg (121 lb)

Sport
- Country: Sri Lanka
- Sport: Badminton
- Handedness: Right

Women's singles & doubles
- Highest ranking: 135 (WS 13 August 2019); 72 (WD with Thilini Hendahewa 13 August 2019); 89 (XD with Sachin Dias 15 November 2022)
- BWF profile
Medal record
Women's badminton
Representing Sri Lanka
South Asian Games
| Gold medal – first place | 2019 Kathmandu-Pokhara | Women's doubles |
| Silver medal – second place | 2016 Guwahati-Shillong | Women's team |
| Silver medal – second place | 2019 Kathmandu-Pokhara | Women's team |
| Bronze medal – third place | 2016 Guwahati-Shillong | Women's singles |
| Bronze medal – third place | 2016 Guwahati-Shillong | Mixed doubles |

Kavidi Ishadika Sirimannage (born 27 September 1995) is a Sri Lankan badminton player. In 2010, she won the mixed doubles title at the Sri Lanka Air Force Championships with Niluka Karunaratne. In 2015, she was crowned as the champion in the women's doubles, and the runner-up in the singles and mixed doubles. In 2016 she helped the Sri Lankan women's team win a silver medal at the South Asian Games, and also won a bronze in the singles and the mixed doubles event. She won the 2017 Summer Season Championships in the women's doubles event with Thilini Hendahewa, and was the runner-up in the singles. She won her first international title at the Lagos International tournament in the women's doubles event with Hendahewa. She competed at the 2017 Summer Universiade in Taipei, Taiwan, and at the 2018 Commonwealth Games in Gold Coast.

== Achievements ==
=== South Asian Games ===
Women's singles
| Year | Venue | Opponent | Score | Result |
|---|---|---|---|---|
| 2016 | Multipurpose Hall SAI–SAG Centre; Shillong, India | (India) P. V. Sindhu | 5–21, 16–21 | Bronze |

Women's doubles
| Year | Venue | Partner | Opponent | Score | Result |
|---|---|---|---|---|---|
| 2019 | Badminton Covered Hall; Pokhara, Nepal | (Sri Lanka) Thilini Hendahewa | (Sri Lanka) Achini Ratnasiri (Sri Lanka) Upuli Weerasinghe | 21–10, 21–7 | Gold |

Mixed doubles
| Year | Venue | Partner | Opponent | Score | Result |
|---|---|---|---|---|---|
| 2016 | Multipurpose Hall SAI–SAG Centre; Shillong, India | (Sri Lanka) Buwaneka Goonethilleka | (India) Manu Attri (India) Ashwini Ponnappa | 17–21, 14–21 | Bronze |

=== BWF International Challenge/Series (2 titles, 3 runners-up) ===
Women's doubles
| Year | Tournament | Partner | Opponent | Score | Result |
|---|---|---|---|---|---|
| 2017 | Lagos International | (Sri Lanka) Thilini Hendahewa | (Nigeria) Zainab Momoh (Nigeria) Ramatu Yakubu | 21–8, 21–5 | (gold) Winner |
| 2018 | Nepal International | (Sri Lanka) Thilini Hendahewa | (India) Aparna Balan (India) Sruthi K. P. | 16–21, 13–21 | (silver) Runner-up |
| 2019 | Maldives Future Series | (Sri Lanka) Thilini Hendahewa | (Chinese Taipei) Kuo Yu-wen (Chinese Taipei) Lin Wan-ching | 19–21, 18–21 | (silver) Runner-up |

Mixed doubles
| Year | Tournament | Partner | Opponent | Score | Result |
|---|---|---|---|---|---|
| 2012 | Maldives International | (Sri Lanka) Hasitha Chanaka | (Wales) Raj Popat (Indonesia) Devi Tika Permatasari | 17–21, 17–21 | (silver) Runner-up |
| 2021 | Bangladesh International | (Sri Lanka) Sachin Dias | (India) Pratik Ranade (India) Akshaya Warang | 21–15, 21–18 | (gold) Winner |

BWF International Challenge tournament
BWF International Series tournament
