= Badminton at the 2016 South Asian Games =

- Venue: Multipurpose Hall SAI–SAG Centre and NEIGRIHMS Indoor Stadium
- Dates: 6–10 February

Badminton at the 2016 South Asian Games was held at the Multipurpose Hall SAI–SAG Centre, NEIGRIHMS Indoor Stadium under North-Eastern Hill University in Shillong, India from 6 February to 10 February 2016.

== Medal summary ==
=== Medal table ===
* Host nation (India)

Rank	Nation	Gold	Silver	Bronze	Total
1	India (IND)*	7	5	0	12
2	Sri Lanka (SRI)	0	2	6	8
3	Pakistan (PAK)	0	0	4	4
4	Bangladesh (BAN)	0	0	2	2
4	Nepal (NEP)	0	0	2	2
Totals (5 entries)		7	7	14	28

=== Medalists ===
Event	Gold	Silver	Bronze
Men's singles	Srikanth Kidambi; India	Prannoy Kumar; India	Muhammad Irfan Saeed Bhatti; Pakistan
Men's singles	Srikanth Kidambi; India	Prannoy Kumar; India	Sachin Dias; Sri Lanka
Women's singles	Ruthvika Gadde; India	P. V. Sindhu; India	Nangsal Tamang; Nepal
Women's singles	Ruthvika Gadde; India	P. V. Sindhu; India	Kavidi Sirimannage; Sri Lanka
Men's doubles	India (IND); Manu Attri; B. Sumeeth Reddy	India (IND); Akshay Dewalkar; Pranav Chopra	Sri Lanka (SRI); Buwaneka Goonethilleka; Sachin Dias
Men's doubles	India (IND); Manu Attri; B. Sumeeth Reddy	India (IND); Akshay Dewalkar; Pranav Chopra	Pakistan (PAK); Rizwan Azam; Sulehri Kashif Ali
Women's doubles	India (IND); Jwala Gutta; Ashwini Ponnappa	India (IND); N. Sikki Reddy; K. Maneesha	Pakistan (PAK); Sidra Hamad; Khizra Rasheed
Women's doubles	India (IND); Jwala Gutta; Ashwini Ponnappa	India (IND); N. Sikki Reddy; K. Maneesha	Sri Lanka (SRI); Achini Ratnasiri; Upuli Weerasinghe
Mixed doubles	India (IND); Pranav Chopra; N. Sikki Reddy	India (IND); Manu Attri; Ashwini Ponnappa	Sri Lanka (SRI); Imesh Hasaranga; Achini Ratnasiri
Mixed doubles	India (IND); Pranav Chopra; N. Sikki Reddy	India (IND); Manu Attri; Ashwini Ponnappa	Sri Lanka (SRI); Buwaneka Goonethilleka; Kavidi Sirimannage
Men's team	India (IND); Manu Attri; B. Sai Praneeth; Pranav Chopra; Akshay Dewalkar; Srikanth Kidambi; Prannoy Kumar; B. Sumeeth Reddy	Sri Lanka (SRI); Sachin Dias; Madhuka Dulanjana; Buwaneka Goonethilleka; Imesh Hasaranga; Vibhavi Madusha; Thisara Nimmika; Pramoddya Ranaweera; Thisal Yatawara	Bangladesh (BAN); Jamil Ahmed Dulal; Mohammad Anamul Haque; Ayman Jaman; Md Rahad Kabir Khaled; Ahsan Habib Parash; Md. Rais Uddin; Saif Uddin
Men's team	India (IND); Manu Attri; B. Sai Praneeth; Pranav Chopra; Akshay Dewalkar; Srikanth Kidambi; Prannoy Kumar; B. Sumeeth Reddy	Sri Lanka (SRI); Sachin Dias; Madhuka Dulanjana; Buwaneka Goonethilleka; Imesh Hasaranga; Vibhavi Madusha; Thisara Nimmika; Pramoddya Ranaweera; Thisal Yatawara	Pakistan (PAK); Murad Ali; Rizwan Azam; Syed Shabbar Hussain; Sulehri Kashif Ali; Muhammad Irfan Saeed Bhatti
Women's team	India (IND); Jwala Gutta; K. Maneesha; Ashwini Ponnappa; Ruthvika Gadde; N. Sikki Reddy; P. V. Sindhu; P. C. Thulasi	Sri Lanka (SRI); Nadeesha Gayanthi; Thilini Hendahewa; Oshadie Kuruppu; Achini Ratnasiri; Lekha Shehani; Chandrika de Silva; Kavidi Sirimannage; Upuli Weerasinghe	Bangladesh (BAN); Shapla Akter; Dulali Haldar; Bristy Khatun; Rehana Parvin; Alina Sultana
Women's team	India (IND); Jwala Gutta; K. Maneesha; Ashwini Ponnappa; Ruthvika Gadde; N. Sikki Reddy; P. V. Sindhu; P. C. Thulasi	Sri Lanka (SRI); Nadeesha Gayanthi; Thilini Hendahewa; Oshadie Kuruppu; Achini Ratnasiri; Lekha Shehani; Chandrika de Silva; Kavidi Sirimannage; Upuli Weerasinghe	Nepal (NEP); Megha Chand; Amita Giri; Jessica Gurung; Anu Maya Rai; Sichhya Shrestha; Nangsal Tamang; Sara Devi Tamang

== Results ==
=== Men's singles ===
Semifinal
(India) Srikanth Kidambi	21	21
(Pakistan) Muhammad Irfan Saeed Bhatti	12	12
(Sri Lanka) Sachin Dias	21	13	16
(India) Prannoy H. S.	14	21	21

Final
(India) Srikanth Kidambi	11	21	21
(India) Prannoy H. S.	21	14	6

=== Women's singles ===
Semifinal
(India) P. V. Sindhu	21	21
(Sri Lanka) Kavidi Sirimannage	5	16
(Nepal) Nangsal Tamang	5	5
(India) Ruthvika Gadde	21	21

Final
(India) P. V. Sindhu	11	20
(India) Ruthvika Gadde	21	22

=== Men's doubles ===
Semi-finals
(India) Manu Attri (India) B. Sumeeth Reddy	21	21
(Sri Lanka) Sachin Dias (Sri Lanka) Buwaneka Goonethilleka	17	13
(Pakistan) Rizwan Azam (Pakistan) Sulehri Kashif Ali	22	16
(India) Pranav Chopra (India) Akshay Dewalkar	24	21

Final
(India) Manu Attri (India) B. Sumeeth Reddy	21	21
(India) Pranav Chopra (India) Akshay Dewalkar	18	17

=== Women's doubles ===
Semi-finals
(India) Jwala Gutta (India) Ashwini Ponnappa	21	21
(Pakistan) Sidra Hamad (Pakistan) Khizra Rasheed	9	3
(Sri Lanka) Achini Ratnasiri (Sri Lanka) Upuli Weerasinghe
(India) K. Maneesha (India) N. Sikki Reddy

Final
(India) Jwala Gutta (India) Ashwini Ponnappa	21	21
(India) K. Maneesha (India) N. Sikki Reddy	9	17

=== Mixed doubles ===
Semi-finals
(India) Manu Attri (India) Ashwini Ponnappa	21	21
(Sri Lanka) Buwaneka Goonethilleka (Sri Lanka) Kavidi Sirimannage	17	14
(Sri Lanka) Imesh Hasaranga (Sri Lanka) Achini Ratnasari	16	10
(India) Pranav Chopra (India) N. Sikki Reddy	21	21

Final
(India) Manu Attri (India) Ashwini Ponnappa	29	17
(India) Pranav Chopra (India) N. Sikki Reddy	30	21
