= Muhammad Irfan Saeed Bhatti =

Pakistani badminton player (born 1992)

Personal information
- Born: 18 November 1992 (age 33) Lahore, Pakistan
- Height: 1.73 m (5 ft 8 in)
- Weight: 68 kg (150 lb)

Sport
- Country: Pakistan
- Sport: Badminton

Men's singles & doubles
- Highest ranking: 323 (MS 8 November 2018); 196 (MD 17 October 2023); 426 (XD 26 January 2017)
- BWF profile
Medal record
Men's badminton
Representing Pakistan
South Asian Games
Bronze medal – third place	2016 Guwahati–Shillong	Men's singles
Bronze medal – third place	2016 Guwahati–Shillong	Men's team

Muhammad Irfan Saeed Bhatti (born 18 November 1992) is a Pakistani badminton player. He competed at the 2014 and 2018 Commonwealth Games. He was the men's doubles champion at the 2016 All Pakistan National ranking tournament. He also the runner-up at Pakistan International tournament in the singles and doubles events. Teamed-up with Azeem Sarwar, they won the men's doubles title at the Nepal Annapurna International Badminton Championship. He was the bronze medalists at the 2016 South Asian Games in the men's singles and team events.

== Achievements ==
=== South Asian Games ===
Men's singles
Year	Venue	Opponent	Score	Result
2016	Multipurpose Hall SAI–SAG Centre; Shillong, India	(India) Srikanth Kidambi	12–21, 12–21	Bronze

=== BWF International Challenge/Series ===
Men's singles
Year	Tournament	Opponent	Score	Result
2016	Pakistan International	(Pakistan) Rizwan Azam	15–21, 18–21	(silver) Runner-up

Men's doubles
Year	Tournament	Partner	Opponent	Score	Result
2016	Pakistan International	(Pakistan) Azeem Sarwar	(Pakistan) Rizwan Azam (Pakistan) Sulehri Kashif Ali	14–21, 13–21	(silver) Runner-up
2017	Pakistan International	(Pakistan) Azeem Sarwar	(Pakistan) Rizwan Azam (Pakistan) Sulehri Kashif Ali	18–21, 18–21	(silver) Runner-up

Mixed doubles
Year	Tournament	Partner	Opponent	Score	Result
2016	Pakistan International	(Pakistan) Mehmona Ameer	(Nepal) Ratnajit Tamang (Nepal) Nangsal Tamang	13–21, 15–21	(silver) Runner-up

BWF International Challenge tournament
BWF International Series tournament
BWF Future Series tournament
