= Stenny Kusuma =

Indonesian badminton player (born 1986)

Personal information
- Born: 7 April 1986 (age 40) Surabaya, East Java, Indonesia
- Height: 1.80 m (5 ft 11 in)

Sport
- Country: Indonesia
- Sport: Badminton
- Event: Men's doubles

Men's doubles
- BWF profile
Medal record
Men's badminton
Representing Indonesia
Asian Junior Championships
Bronze medal – third place	2004 Hwacheon	Boys' team

Stenny Kusuma (born 7 April 1986) is an Indonesian badminton player. He was part of the Indonesian junior team that won the bronze medal at the 2004 Asian Junior Championships in the boys' team event. Kusuma who played for the Suryanaga Surabaya club was hired by the Spanish Badminton Federation in 2006. After nine months in Spain, he was selected to join the national team, but due to a personal reason, he left the team and joined the Rinconada club in Seville. Kusuma was the men's doubles champion at the 2004 Pakistan Satellite and 2009 Portugal International tournament.

== Achievements ==
=== BWF International Challenge/Series ===
Men's doubles
Year	Tournament	Partner	Opponent	Score	Result
2004	Pakistan Satellite	(Indonesia) Bagus Suprobo	(India) Markose Bristow (India) Jaison Xavier	15–5, 15–11	(gold) Winner
2009	Portugal International	(Spain) Ruben Gordown Khosadalina	(France) Laurent Constantin (France) Sébastien Vincent	21–12, 21–11	(gold) Winner

BWF International Challenge tournament
BWF International Series tournament
