= Alina Sultana =

Bangladeshi badminton player

Personal information
- Born: 3 December 1984 (age 41) Khulna, Bangladesh

Sport
- Country: Bangladesh
- Sport: Badminton
- Event: Women's singles & doubles

Women's singles & doubles
- BWF profile
Medal record
Women's badminton
Representing Bangladesh
South Asian Games
Bronze medal – third place	2010 Dhaka	Women's team
Bronze medal – third place	2016 Guwahati-Shillong	Women's team

Alina Sultana (born 3 December 1984) is a Bangladeshi badminton player.

== Early life ==
Born in Khulna, Sultana comes from a sports friendly family. Her elder sister, Sabiha Sultana is a national handball player. She first played badminton in class seven in Khulna Fatema Missionary High School.

== Career ==
Alina Sultana won silver at the 2008 national championship in Bangladesh with Shapla Akhter, conceding against Konika Rani and Jebunnesa Seema in the final. She was the national champion in 2010. In the South Asian Games in 2010, Alina Sultana won bronze with the women's team from Bangladesh. She won bronze medal in 2010 South Asian Games. Sultana finished her level one coaches course in 2017 in Kathmandu, Nepal.

== Personal life ==
Sultana married fellow sutler Enayetullah Khan. The couple has a daughter, Arshi, born in 2013. She completed her master's degree from Eden Mohila College in finance and banking earning first class.
