= Oshadie Kuruppu =

Sri Lankan badminton player (1994–2022)

Personal information
- Full name: Oshadie Poornima Kuruppu
- Born: 20 August 1994
- Died: 8 February 2022 (aged 27)

Sport
- Event(s): Singles, doubles, team
Medal record
Women's badminton
Representing Sri Lanka
South Asian Games
Silver medal – second place	2016 Guwahati	Women's team

Oshadie Poornima Kuruppu (also spelt as Oshadi Kuruppu, 20 August 1994 – 8 February 2022) was a Sri Lankan badminton player. Starting in 2015 she represented Sri Lanka at senior level in several international competitions including the 2016 South Asian Games, 2016 Badminton Asia Team Championships and 2017 Summer Universiade. She received her primary and secondary education at Visakha Vidyalaya.

She claimed silver medal in the women's team event at the 2016 South Asian Games. Oshadie pursued a Sports Science and Management Honours Degree from the Sabaragamuwa University of Sri Lanka in 2019. In August 2020, she was admitted at the Apeksha Hospital in Maharagama due to leukaemia and underwent a bone marrow surgery. Kuruppu died from the disease on 8 February 2022, at the age of 27.
