= Palwasha Bashir =

Pakistani badminton player

Personal information
- Born: October 20, 1987 (age 39) Karachi, Sindh, Pakistan
- Height: 1.65 m (5 ft 5 in)
- Weight: 62 kg (137 lb)

Sport
- Country: Pakistan
- Sport: Badminton
- Handedness: Right
- Coached by: Raziuddin Ahmad

Women's singles & doubles
- Highest ranking: 209 (WS 27 October 2016); 185 (WD 28 April 2016); 720 (XD 22 September 2016)
- BWF profile
Medal record
Women's badminton
Representing Pakistan
South Asian Games
Bronze medal – third place	2010 Dhaka	Women's singles
Bronze medal – third place	2019 Kathmandu-Pokhara	Women's team

Palwasha Bashir (born 20 October 1987) is a badminton player, born in Karachi, Pakistan. Bashir was crowned the national champion in 2009, winning the women's singles and doubles titles. Palwasha has been representing Pakistan for several years at different international competitions. Initially, she was a rising star on the national level, winning back-to-back national titles. She won the bronze medal at the 2010 South Asian Games held in Dhaka. This brought her greater fame and acknowledgement in Pakistan. Bashir has represented her country at the 2014 Asian Games, as well as the 2014 and 2018 Commonwealth Games. She has been coached by Raziuddin Ahmad.

== Achievements ==
=== South Asian Games ===
Women's singles
Year	Venue	Opponent	Score	Result
2010	Wooden-Floor Gymnasium; Dhaka, Bangladesh	(India) Sayali Gokhale	8–21, 3–21	Bronze

=== BWF International Challenge/Series (3 titles, 2 runners-up) ===
Women's singles
Year	Tournament	Opponent	Score	Result
2016	Pakistan International	(Pakistan) Mahoor Shahzad	13–21, 21–18, 23–21	(gold) Winner

Women's doubles
Year	Tournament	Partner	Opponent	Score	Result
2020	Kenya International	(Pakistan) Mahoor Shahzad	(Egypt) Doha Hany (Egypt) Hadia Hosny	13–21, 17–21	(silver) Runner-up
2017	Pakistan International	(Pakistan) Khizra Rasheed	(Pakistan) Sehra Akram (Pakistan) Huma Javeed	21–12, 21–11	(gold) Winner
2016	Pakistan International	(Pakistan) Saima Manzoor	(Pakistan) Sidra Hamad (Pakistan) Khizra Rasheed	13–21, 21–11, 21–16	(gold) Winner
2015	Bahrain International	(Pakistan) Sara Mohmand	(India) S. Poorvisha Ram (India) Arathi Sara Sunil	14–21, 8–21	(silver) Runner-up

BWF International Challenge tournament
BWF International Series tournament
BWF Future Series tournament
