= Ratnajit Tamang =

Nepalese badminton player (born 1993)

Personal information
- Born: 1 January 1993 (age 33) Bhojpur, Nepal
- Height: 1.76 m (5 ft 9 in)
- Weight: 59 kg (130 lb)

Sport
- Country: Nepal
- Sport: Badminton
- Handedness: Right

Men's singles & doubles
- Highest ranking: 159 (MS 10 February 2017); 116 (MD 9 July 2019); 132 (XD 13 July 2017)
- BWF profile
Medal record
Men's badminton
Representing Nepal
South Asian Games
Bronze medal – third place	2010 Dhaka	Men's team
Bronze medal – third place	2019 Kathmandu–Pokhara	Men's singles
Bronze medal – third place	2019 Kathmandu–Pokhara	Men's team

Ratna Jit Tamang (born 1 January 1993) is a Nepalese badminton player. He was born in badminton family. His father Dan Bahadur Tamang was a former national player, and his sister Nangsal and Sara Devi also play badminton in the international event. In 2016, he became the first Nepalese that won the international tournament in Pakistan together with Nangsal in the mixed doubles event.

== Achievements ==
=== South Asian Games ===
Men's singles
Year	Venue	Opponent	Score	Result
2019	Badminton Covered Hall; Pokhara, Nepal	(India) Aryamann Tandon	18–21, 21–14, 18–21	Bronze

=== BWF International Challenge/Series (1 title, 2 runners-up) ===
Men's doubles
Year	Tournament	Partner	Opponent	Score	Result
2019	Pakistan International	(Nepal) Dipesh Dhami	(Thailand) Prad Tangsrirapeephan (Thailand) Apichasit Teerawiwat	24–26, 14–21	(silver) Runner-up

Mixed doubles
Year	Tournament	Partner	Opponent	Score	Result
2016	Pakistan International	(Nepal) Nangsal Tamang	(Pakistan) Muhammad Irfan Saeed Bhatti (Pakistan) Mehmona Ameer	21–13, 21–15	(gold) Winner
2017	Pakistan International	(Nepal) Nangsal Tamang	(Nepal) Dipesh Dhami (Nepal) Shova Gauchan	14–21, 13–21	(silver) Runner-up

BWF International Challenge tournament
BWF International Series tournament
BWF Future Series tournament
