= Saima Manzoor =

Pakistani badminton player (born 1981)

Personal information
- Born: 24 March 1981 (age 45)

Sport
- Country: Pakistan
- Sport: Badminton

Women's singles & doubles
- Highest ranking: 476 (WS 27 October 2016); 253 (WD 15 June 2017); 375 (XD 20 September 2018)
- BWF profile
Medal record
Women's badminton
Representing Pakistan
South Asian Games
| Bronze medal – third place | 2004 Islamabad | Mixed doubles |
| Bronze medal – third place | 2004 Islamabad | Women's team |
| Bronze medal – third place | 2006 Colombo | Mixed doubles |
| Bronze medal – third place | 2006 Colombo | Women's team |

Saima Manzoor (born 24 March 1981), also known as Saima Waqas, is a Pakistani badminton player. She was the bronze medalists at the 2006 South Asian Games in both the mixed doubles and team events. Manzoor won the women's doubles event at the 2016 Pakistan International tournament.

== Achievements ==
=== South Asian Games ===
Mixed doubles
| Year | Venue | Partner | Opponent | Score | Result |
|---|---|---|---|---|---|
| 2004 | Rodham Hall; Islamabad, Pakistan | (Pakistan) Mirza Ali Yar Beg | (India) Jaseel P. Ismail (India) Jwala Gutta | 4–15, 2–15 | Bronze |
| 2006 | Sugathadasa Indoor Stadium; Colombo, Sri Lanka | (Pakistan) Waqas Ahmed | (India) Valiyaveetil Diju (India) Jwala Gutta | 21–19, 15–21, 17–21 | Bronze |

=== BWF International Challenge/Series ===
Women's doubles
| Year | Tournament | Partner | Opponent | Score | Result |
|---|---|---|---|---|---|
| 2016 | Pakistan International | (Pakistan) Palwasha Bashir | (Pakistan) Sidra Hamad (Pakistan) Khizra Rasheed | 13–21, 21–11, 21–16 | (gold) Winner |

BWF International Challenge tournament
BWF International Series tournament
BWF Future Series tournament
