= Sehra Akram =

Pakistani badminton player (born 1995)

Personal information
- Born: 1 October 1995 (age 30) Pakistan

Sport
- Country: Pakistan
- Sport: Badminton

Singles and women's doubles
- Highest ranking: 276 (WS 6 September 2018) 354 (WD 6 September 2018)
- Current ranking: 508 (WS 16 November 2020); 416 (WD 16 November 2020)
- BWF profile
Medal record
Women's badminton
Representing Pakistan
South Asian Games
Bronze medal – third place	2019 Kathmandu-Pokhara	Women's team

Sehra Akram (born 1 October 1995) is a badminton player from Pakistan.

== Career ==
=== National ===
Akram represents WAPDA in domestic competitions including National Championships and National Games.

2020
At the 57th National Badminton Championship held in Lahore, Pakistan, Akram competed in singles and women's doubles. In the singles, she reached the semi-finals where lost to Mahoor Shahzad, the eventual champion. In doubles, she paired with Huma Javeed and was beaten by Mahoor Shahzad (Wapda) and Palwasha Bashir (NBP) in 2 sets (21-9 and 21–8).

=== International ===
Akram was part of the six-member Pakistan women's team which competed at the 2019 South Asian Games held in Kathmandu, Nepal.
