= K. Maneesha =

Indian badminton player (born 1995)

Personal information
- Born: Kukkapalli Maneesha; 29 April 1995 (age 31) Guntur, Andhra Pradesh, India

Sport
- Country: India
- Sport: Badminton
- Handedness: Right

Women's & mixed doubles
- Highest ranking: 53 (WD with Rutaparna Panda, 3 March 2020); 41 (XD with Arjun M. R., 6 August 2019)
- Current ranking: 42 (XD with Dhruv Rawat, 29 September 2026)
- BWF profile
Medal record
Women's badminton
Representing India
Uber Cup
Bronze medal – third place	2016 Kunshan	Women's team
South Asian Games
Gold medal – first place	2016 Guwahati–Shillong	Women's team
Silver medal – second place	2016 Guwahati–Shillong	Women's doubles
Commonwealth Youth Games
Silver medal – second place	2011 Douglas	Mixed doubles
Asia Junior Championships
Bronze medal – third place	2011 Lucknow	Mixed team

Kukkapalli Maneesha (born 29 April 1995) is an Indian badminton player who currently plays women's and mixed doubles. She partners Sanyogita Ghorpade for women's doubles events and previously partnered with J. Meghana, P. V. Sindhu. For mixed doubles events she partners with Satwiksairaj Rankireddy, and previously, Manu Attri and K. Nandagopal.

== Achievements ==
=== South Asian Games ===
Women's doubles
Year	Venue	Partner	Opponent	Score	Result
2016	Multipurpose Hall SAI–SAG Centre; Shillong, India	(India) N. Sikki Reddy	(India) Jwala Gutta (India) Ashwini Ponnappa	9–21, 17–21	Silver

=== Commonwealth Youth Games ===
Mixed doubles
Year	Venue	Partner	Opponent	Score	Result
2011	National Sports Centre, Douglas, Isle of Man	(India) Srikanth Kidambi	(Malaysia) Teo Ee Yi (Malaysia) Chow Mei Kuan	21–18, 16–21, 8–21	Silver

=== BWF Grand Prix (1 runner-up) ===
The BWF Grand Prix had two levels, the Grand Prix and Grand Prix Gold. It was a series of badminton tournaments sanctioned by the Badminton World Federation (BWF) and played between 2007 and 2017.

Mixed doubles
Year	Tournament	Partner	Opponent	Score	Result
2015	Syed Modi International	(India) Manu Attri	(Indonesia) Riky Widianto (Indonesia) Richi Puspita Dili	17–21, 17–21	(silver) Runner-up

BWF Grand Prix Gold tournament
BWF Grand Prix tournament

=== BWF International Challenge/Series (12 titles, 12 runners-up) ===
Women's doubles
Year	Tournament	Partner	Opponent	Score	Result
2014	Tata India International	(India) Meghana Jakkampudi	(India) Aparna Balan (India) Prajakta Sawant	13–21, 21–10, 13–21	(silver) Runner-up
2015	Tata India International	(India) N. Sikki Reddy	(Thailand) Chaladchalam Chayanit (Thailand) Phataimas Muenwong	11–21, 21–15, 13–21	(silver) Runner-up
2017	Polish International	(India) Arathi Sara Sunil	(England) Jenny Moore (England) Victoria Williams	19–21, 22–24	(silver) Runner-up
2019	Ghana International	(India) Rutaparna Panda	(Nigeria) Dorcas Ajoke Adesokan (Nigeria) Uchechukwu Deborah Ukeh	21–11, 21–11	(gold) Winner
2019	Nepal International	(India) Rutaparna Panda	(Australia) Setyana Mapasa (Australia) Gronya Somerville	10–21, 21–18, 11–21	(silver) Runner-up
2019	Bangladesh International	(India) Rutaparna Panda	(Malaysia) Pearly Tan (Malaysia) Thinaah Muralitharan	20–22, 19–21	(silver) Runner-up

Mixed doubles
Year	Tournament	Partner	Opponent	Score	Result
2013	Maldives International	(India) K. Nandagopal	(South Korea) Kim Dae-sung (South Korea) Oh Bo-kyung	21–16, 23–21	(gold) Winner
2015	Tata India International	(India) Satwiksairaj Rankireddy	(India) Arun Vishnu (India) Aparna Balan	21–13, 21–16	(gold) Winner
2016	Mauritius International	(India) Satwiksairaj Rankireddy	(Malaysia) Yogendran Khrishnan (India) Prajakta Sawant	21–19, 11–21, 21–17	(gold) Winner
2016	India International Series	(India) Satwiksairaj Rankireddy	(Malaysia) Low Hang Yee (Malaysia) Cheah Yee See	5–11, 11–8, 12–10, 11–8	(gold) Winner
2016	Bangladesh International	(India) Satwiksairaj Rankireddy	(Thailand) Tanupat Viriyangkura (Thailand) Thanyasuda Wongya	21–12, 21–12	(gold) Winner
2018	Lagos International	(India) Manu Attri	(India) Rohan Kapoor (India) Kuhoo Garg	21–17, 23–21	(gold) Winner
2018	Hellas Open	(India) Arjun M. R.	(Poland) Paweł Pietryja (Poland) Agnieszka Wojtkowska	21–15, 21–14	(gold) Winner
2019	Ghana International	(India) Arjun M. R.	(India) Ramchandran Shlok (India) Rutaparna Panda	19–21, 15–21	(silver) Runner-up
2019	Lagos International	(India) Arjun M. R.	(India) Ramchandran Shlok (India) Rutaparna Panda	21–16, 21–17	(gold) Winner
2022 (I)	India International Challenge	(India) Gouse Shaik	(Thailand) Ruttanapak Oupthong (Thailand) Jhenicha Sudjaipraparat	18–21, 9–21	(silver) Runner-up
2022	Bahrain International	(India) B. Sumeeth Reddy	(Thailand) Ruttanapak Oupthong (Thailand) Jhenicha Sudjaipraparat	20–22, 17–21	(silver) Runner-up
2024	Kazakhstan International	(India) Sanjai Srivatsa Dhanraj	(Malaysia) Wong Tien Ci (Malaysia) Lim Chiew Sien	21–9, 7–21, 12–21	(silver) Runner-up
2025	Uganda International	(India) Dhruv Rawat	(India) Ishaan Bhatnagar (India) Srinidhi Narayanan	18–21, 3–9 retired	(silver) Runner-up
2025	Lagos International	(India) Dhruv Rawat	(Indonesia) Bimo Prasetyo (Indonesia) Thesya Munggaran	15–21, 17–21	(silver) Runner-up
2025 (I)	India International	(India) Dhruv Rawat	(Thailand) Thanawin Madee (Thailand) Napapakorn Tungkasatan	18–21, 21–18, 22–20	(gold) Winner
2026	Mexican International	(India) Dhruv Rawat	(Brazil) Davi Silva (Brazil) Sânia Lima	19–21, 25–23, 22–24	(silver) Runner-up
2026	Lagos International	(India) Dhruv Rawat	(India) Sathwik Reddy Kanapuram (India) Radhika Sharma	21–18, 17–21, 16–11 (retired)	(gold) Winner
2026	Cameroon International	(India) Dhruv Rawat	(Algeria) Koceila Mammeri (Algeria) Tanina Mammeri	23–21, 21–17	(gold) Winner

BWF International Challenge tournament
BWF International Series tournament
BWF Future Series tournament
