= Nangsal Tamang =

Nepalese badminton player (born 1987)

Personal information
- Born: Nangsal Devi Tamang; 28 December 1987 (age 38) Bhojpur, Nepal
- Height: 1.55 m (5 ft 1 in)
- Weight: 49 kg (108 lb)

Sport
- Country: Nepal
- Sport: Badminton

Women's singles & doubles
- Highest ranking: 155 (WS 6 July 2017); 208 (WD 12 November 2019); 132 (XD 13 July 2017)
- BWF profile
Medal record
Women's badminton
Representing Nepal
South Asian Games
Bronze medal – third place	2010 Dhaka	Women's team
Bronze medal – third place	2016 Guwahati-Shillong	Women's singles
Bronze medal – third place	2016 Guwahati-Shillong	Women's team
Bronze medal – third place	2019 Kathmandu-Pokhara	Women's team

Nangsal Devi Tamang (born 28 February 1987) is a Nepalese badminton player. In 2014, she competed at the Incheon Asian Games in the women's singles event but was defeated by Bellaetrix Manuputty of Indonesia in the first round. In 2016, she won the mixed doubles title at the Pakistan International tournament with her siblings Ratnajit. She also was the third place in the women's singles. After won the Pakistan International, the siblings received the Zest honours. At the national event, she plays for the Tribuvan Army Club, and at the Pushpa Lal Memorial National Open Badminton Championships, she won the women's singles and doubles event.

== Achievements ==
=== South Asian Games ===
Women's singles
Year	Venue	Opponent	Score	Result
2016	Multipurpose Hall SAI–SAG Centre; Shillong, India	(India) Gadde Ruthvika Shivani	5–21, 5–21	Bronze

=== BWF International Challenge/Series ===
Women's doubles
Year	Tournament	Partner	Opponent	Score	Result
2019	Nepal International	(Nepal) Pooja Shrestha	(Nepal) Jessica Gurung (Nepal) Anu Maya Rai	21–15, 21–16	(gold) Winner

Mixed doubles
Year	Tournament	Partner	Opponent	Score	Result
2016	Pakistan International	(Nepal) Ratnajit Tamang	(Pakistan) Muhammad Irfan Saeed Bhatti (Pakistan) Mehmona Ameer	21–13, 21–15	(gold) Winner
2017	Pakistan International	(Nepal) Ratnajit Tamang	(Nepal) Dipesh Dhami (Nepal) Shova Gauchan	14–21, 13–21	(silver) Runner-up

BWF International Challenge tournament
BWF International Series tournament
BWF Future Series tournament
