= Mahoor Shahzad =

Pakistani badminton player

Personal information
- Born: 17 October 1996 (age 30) Karachi, Pakistan
- Years active: 2014–present
- Height: 170 cm (5 ft 7 in)
- Weight: 56 kg (123 lb)

Sport
- Country: Pakistan
- Sport: Badminton
- Handedness: Right
- Coached by: Muhammad Shahzad

Women's singles & doubles
- Highest ranking: 117 (WS 17 March 2020); 146 (WD 17 March 2020)
- BWF profile
Medal record
Women's badminton
Representing Pakistan
South Asian Games
Bronze medal – third place	2019 Kathmandu–Pokhara	Women's team

Mahoor Shahzad (born 17 October 1996) is a Pakistani badminton player. She represented Pakistan at the 2020 Summer Olympics in Tokyo after receiving a tripartite invitation, becoming the first Pakistani badminton player to compete at the Olympic Games. She was also Pakistan's flag bearer at the opening ceremony along with the sports shooter Muhammad Khalil Akhtar. She also has competed at the 2014, 2018, 2022, 2026 Asian Games and also at the 2018 and 2022 Commonwealth Games.

== Education ==
Shahzad graduated from the Institute of Business Administration, Karachi in 2018, with Economics and Mathematics as her subjects.

== Career ==
Shahzad began playing badminton in 2008 in Karachi. She is a six-time national badminton champion of Pakistan. She won the women's singles titles at the 2017 and 2019 editions of the Pakistan International Series. She achieved career-best world ranking of No. 138, the first Pakistani female badminton player to break into badminton's top 140.

== Achievements ==
=== BWF International Challenge/Series (2 titles, 3 runners-up) ===
Women's singles

Year	Tournament	Opponent	Score	Result
2016	Pakistan International	(Pakistan) Palwasha Bashir	21–13, 18–21, 21–23	(silver) Runner-up
2017	Pakistan International	(Sri Lanka) Hasini Nusaka Ambalangodage	21–15, 21–19	(gold) Winner
2019	Pakistan International	(Iran) Soraya Aghaei	21–15, 16–21, 21–16	(gold) Winner

Women's doubles
Year	Tournament	Partner	Opponent	Score	Result
2019	Pakistan International	(Pakistan) Bushra Qayyum	(Maldives) Aminath Nabeeha Abdul Razzaq (Maldives) Fathimath Nabaaha Abdul Razzaq	17–21, 13–21	(silver) Runner-up
2020	Kenya International	(Pakistan) Palwasha Bashir	(Egypt) Doha Hany (Egypt) Hadia Hosny	13–21, 17–21	(silver) Runner-up

BWF International Challenge tournament
BWF International Series tournament
BWF Future Series tournament

== Personal life ==
Shahzad's father, Muhammad Shahzad, is an indoor rower athlete. Her sister, Rabia Shahzad, is a weightlifter who has won several international medals for Pakistan.

Olympic Games
Preceded by Shah Hussain Shah	Flagbearer for Pakistan; Tokyo 2020	Succeeded by Incumbent
