= Thilini Hendahewa =

Sri Lankan badminton player (born 1996)

Personal information
- Born: 18 September 1996 (age 30) Colombo, Sri Lanka
- Height: 1.69 m (5 ft 7 in)
- Weight: 56 kg (123 lb)

Sport
- Country: Sri Lanka
- Sport: Badminton

Women's singles & doubles
- Highest ranking: 233 (WS 13 August 2019); 72 (WD 13 August 2019); 113 (XD 1 February 2022)
- BWF profile
Medal record
Women's badminton
Representing Sri Lanka
South Asian Games
Gold medal – first place	2019 Kathmandu–Pokhara	Women's doubles
Silver medal – second place	2016 Guwahati–Shillong	Women's team
Silver medal – second place	2019 Kathmandu–Pokhara	Mixed doubles
Silver medal – second place	2019 Kathmandu–Pokhara	Women's team

Thilini Pramodika Hendahewa (born 18 September 1996) is a Sri Lankan badminton player. She competed at the 2014 Summer Youth Olympics in Nanjing, China, also at the 2014 and 2018 Commonwealth Games. Hendahewa was the women' singles champion at the 2014 Sri Lanka national championships. She won her first senior international title at the 2017 Lagos International tournament in the women's singles and doubles event. Together with Kavidi Sirimannage, they claimed the gold medal in the 2019 South Asian Games. She became one of the first two Sri Lankans to win a BWF World Tour tournament, when she won the mixed doubles event alongside Sachin Dias at the 2022 Odisha Open.

Hendahewa educated applied sciences at University of Sri Jayewardenepura in Nugegoda.

== Achievements ==
=== South Asian Games ===
Women's doubles
Year	Venue	Partner	Opponent	Score	Result
2019	Badminton Covered Hall; Pokhara, Nepal	(Sri Lanka) Kavidi Sirimannage	(Sri Lanka) Achini Ratnasiri (Sri Lanka) Upuli Weerasinghe	21–10, 21–7	Gold

Mixed doubles
Year	Venue	Partner	Opponent	Score	Result
2019	Badminton Covered Hall; Pokhara, Nepal	(Sri Lanka) Sachin Dias	(India) Dhruv Kapila (India) Meghana Jakkampudi	16–21, 14–21	Silver

=== BWF World Tour (1 title) ===
The BWF World Tour, which was announced on 19 March 2017 and implemented in 2018, is a series of elite badminton tournaments sanctioned by the Badminton World Federation (BWF). The BWF World Tours are divided into levels of World Tour Finals, Super 1000, Super 750, Super 500, Super 300 (part of the HSBC World Tour), and the BWF Tour Super 100.

Mixed doubles
Year	Tournament	Level	Partner	Opponent	Score	Result
2022	Odisha Open	Super 100	(Sri Lanka) Sachin Dias	(India) Arjun M. R. (India) Treesa Jolly	21–16, 22–20	(gold) Winner

=== BWF International Challenge/Series (2 titles, 2 runners-up) ===
Women's singles
Year	Tournament	Opponent	Score	Result
2017	Lagos International	(India) Mugdha Agrey	21–13, 21–19	(gold) Winner

Women's doubles
Year	Tournament	Partner	Opponent	Score	Result
2017	Lagos International	(Sri Lanka) Kavidi Sirimannage	(Nigeria) Zainab Momoh (Nigeria) Ramatu Yakubu	21–8, 21–5	(gold) Winner
2018	Nepal International	(Sri Lanka) Kavidi Sirimannage	(India) Aparna Balan (India) Sruthi K.P	16–21, 13–21	(silver) Runner-up
2019	Maldives Future Series	(Sri Lanka) Kavidi Sirimannage	(Chinese Taipei) Kuo Yu-wen (Chinese Taipei) Lin Wan-ching	19–21, 18–21	(silver) Runner-up

BWF International Challenge tournament
BWF International Series tournament
BWF Future Series tournament
