= Pakistan International (badminton) =

Badminton tournament held in Pakistan

The Pakistan International is an international badminton tournament held in Pakistan organised by Pakistan Badminton Federation. In 2004, this tournament known as Pakistan Satellite and the International Badminton Federation has graded the tournament with "A grade" and its points would be included in world ranking. This tournament also became the stage for Pakistani players to compete and see their performance in international event.

== Previous winners ==
Year	Men's singles	Women's singles	Men's doubles	Women's doubles	Mixed doubles
2004	(Indonesia) Jeffer Rosobin	(India) B. R. Meenakshi	(Indonesia) Bagus Suprobo (Indonesia) Stenny Kusuma	(India) Dhanya Nair (India) Sharada Govardhini	(India) Markose Bristow (India) B. R. Meenakshi
2005– 2006	Not held				
2007	(Canada) Bobby Milroy	(Slovenia) Maja Tvrdy	(Pakistan) Ahmad Muhammad Waqas (Pakistan) Sulehri Kashif Ali	(India) Jwala Gutta (India) Shruti Kurien	(India) Valiyaveetil Diju (India) Aparna Balan
2008– 2015	Not held				
2016	(Pakistan) Rizwan Azam	(Pakistan) Palwasha Bashir	(Pakistan) Rizwan Azam (Pakistan) Sulehri Kashif Ali	(Pakistan) Palwasha Bashir (Pakistan) Saima Manzoor	(Nepal) Ratnajit Tamang (Nepal) Nangsal Tamang
2017	(Vietnam) Lê Đức Phát	(Pakistan) Mahoor Shahzad	(Pakistan) Rizwan Azam (Pakistan) Sulehri Kashif Ali	(Pakistan) Palwasha Bashir (Pakistan) Khizra Rasheed	(Nepal) Dipesh Dhami (Nepal) Shova Gauchan
2018	Not held				
2019	(Thailand) Saran Jamsri	(Pakistan) Mahoor Shahzad	(Thailand) Prad Tangsrirapeephan (Thailand) Apichasit Teerawiwat	(Maldives) Aminath Nabeeha Abdul Razzaq (Maldives) Fathimath Nabaaha Abdul Razzaq	(Maldives) Hussein Zayan Shaheed (Maldives) Fathimath Nabaaha Abdul Razzaq
2020– 2021	Not held				
2022	Cancelled (Note: This tournament, originally to be played on 25–30 October, was later cancelled due to the COVID-19 pandemic in Pakistan.)				
2022	Cancelled (Note: This tournament, originally to be played on 1–6 November, was later cancelled due to the COVID-19 pandemic in Pakistan.)				

== Performances by nation ==
Pos	Nation	MS	WS	MD	WD	XD	Total
1	Pakistan	1	3	3	2	0	9
2	India	0	1	0	2	2	5
3	Indonesia	1	0	1	0	0	2
3	Maldives	0	0	0	1	1	2
3	Nepal	0	0	0	0	2	2
3	Thailand	1	0	1	0	0	2
7	Canada	1	0	0	0	0	1
7	Slovenia	0	1	0	0	0	1
7	Vietnam	1	0	0	0	0	1
Total		5	5	5	5	5	25
