= Ashwini Ponnappa =

Indian badminton player (born 1989)

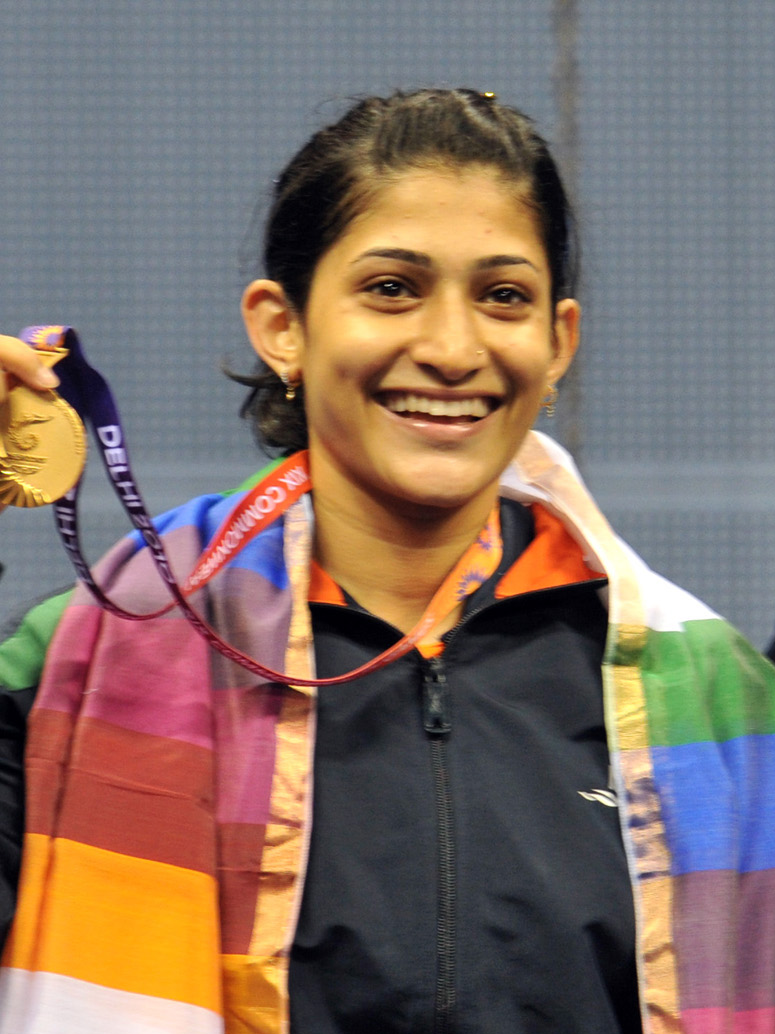
- Ponnappa in 2010

Personal information
- Born: 18 September 1989 (age 37) Bangalore, Karnataka, India
- Years active: 2007–present
- Height: 1.64 m (5 ft 5 in)
- Weight: 60 kg (132 lb)

Sport
- Country: India
- Sport: Badminton
- Handedness: Right

Women's & mixed doubles
- Highest ranking: 10 (WD with Jwala Gutta, 20 August 2015); 19 (XD with Satwiksairaj Rankireddy, 3 February 2021)
- BWF profile
Medal record
Women's badminton
Representing India
World Championships
Bronze medal – third place	2011 London	Women's doubles
Uber Cup
Bronze medal – third place	2014 New Delhi	Women's team
Bronze medal – third place	2016 Kunshan	Women's team
Commonwealth Games
Gold medal – first place	2010 Delhi	Women's doubles
Gold medal – first place	2018 Gold Coast	Mixed team
Silver medal – second place	2010 Delhi	Mixed team
Silver medal – second place	2014 Glasgow	Women's doubles
Silver medal – second place	2022 Birmingham	Mixed team
Bronze medal – third place	2018 Gold Coast	Women's doubles
Asian Games
Bronze medal – third place	2014 Incheon	Women's team
Asian Championships
Bronze medal – third place	2014 Gimcheon	Women's doubles
Asia Team Championships
Gold medal – first place	2024 Selangor	Women's team
South Asian Games
Gold medal – first place	2010 Dhaka	Mixed doubles
Gold medal – first place	2010 Dhaka	Women's team
Gold medal – first place	2016 Guwahati–Shillong	Women's doubles
Gold medal – first place	2016 Guwahati–Shillong	Women's team
Silver medal – second place	2010 Dhaka	Women's doubles
Silver medal – second place	2016 Guwahati–Shillong	Mixed doubles

Ashwini Ponnappa Machimanda (born 18 September 1989) is an Indian badminton player who represents the country at the international badminton circuit in both the women's and mixed doubles disciplines. She had a successful partnership with Jwala Gutta as the pair has won many medals in international events including a gold medal at the Commonwealth Games and bronze medals at the Uber Cup and the Asian Badminton Championships. They were consistently ranked among the top 20 in the BWF World Ranking reaching as high as no. 10. Ponnappa and Gutta also won the bronze medal at the BWF World Championships in 2011, becoming the first Indian pair and women and only the second overall to win a medal at the World Championships.

== Early life ==
Ashwini Ponnappa was born on 18 September 1989 in Bangalore. She was educated at St. Francis Xavier Girls High School, Bangalore and at St. Mary's College, Hyderabad. Her father played hockey for India. However Ashwini preferred badminton over hockey and started training in badminton.

== Career ==
In 2001, Ashwini Ponnappa won her first national title in 2004 in the sub-junior girls' doubles category. She also won the national title in sub-junior girls' doubles in 2005, and the Junior girls' doubles National title in 2006 and 2007. She won the gold medal in mixed doubles and the team events at the South Asian Games held in 2010. In the 2010 Commonwealth Games, she won the gold medal in Women's Doubles event pairing with Jwala Gutta, making history by winning the first gold medal for India in the event. Gutta and Ponnappa became household names after winning the medal in front of home crowd.

Later on in 2011 they came up with one of their finest performances when she and Gutta etched their names in history books becoming the first Indian pair to ensure a medal at the World Badminton Championships. The pair defeated 12th seeds Vita Marrisa and Nadya Melati of Indonesia 17–21, 21–10, 21–17 to storm into the women's doubles semifinal before losing out to Chinese fifth seeds in the semis in London, thereby winning a bronze in the Badminton World Championship.

She participated in the women's doubles at the 2012 London Olympics. Ponnappa and Gutta lost their opening women's doubles match against the Japanese duo of Mizuki Fujii and Reika Kakiiwa. They then went on to beat much higher ranked Wen Hsing Cheng and Yu Chin Chien of Chinese Taipei 25–23, 16–21, 21–18 to register their first win in the group stages. Jwala and Ashwini missed out on a quarterfinal berth by a difference of just one point, even though they beat Shinta Mulia Sari and Lei Yao of Singapore 21–16 21–15 in their last group B match, after tying with Japan and Taipei on the number of wins. Prior to India's final group game on Tuesday night, the World number five Japanese pair of Mizuki Fujii and Reika Kakiiwa had shockingly lost to Chinese Taipei's Cheng Wen Hsing and Chien Yu Chin, ranked 10th, 19–21 11–21. India lodged a formal protest with the Games organizers to probe if the women's doubles badminton match involving Japan and Chinese Taipei was played in the right spirit, following the elimination of medal hopes Jwala Gutta and Ashwini Ponnappa but no action was taken. Following the Olympic Games Jwala went to a temporary sabbatical from the game. Ponnappa then partnered Pradnya Gadre for a brief period of time in 2013 and then re-united with Jwala later in the year. At the 2014 Commonwealth Games, Ponnappa and Gutta won the silver medal in the women's doubles, losing to a Malaysian pair in the final. On 29 June 2015, playing with Jwala, they won the Canada Open women's doubles title by defeating the top-seeded Dutch pair of Eefje Muskens and Selena Piek. She competed with Gutta at the 2016 Olympics, but they lost all three of their group stage matches and therefore did not progress further. At the 2018 Commonwealth Games, Ponnappa was part of the Indian team which won gold in the mixed team event, and won bronze with N. Sikki Reddy in the women's doubles.

== Personal life ==
On 24 December 2017, she married businessman and model Karan Medappa.

== Achievements ==
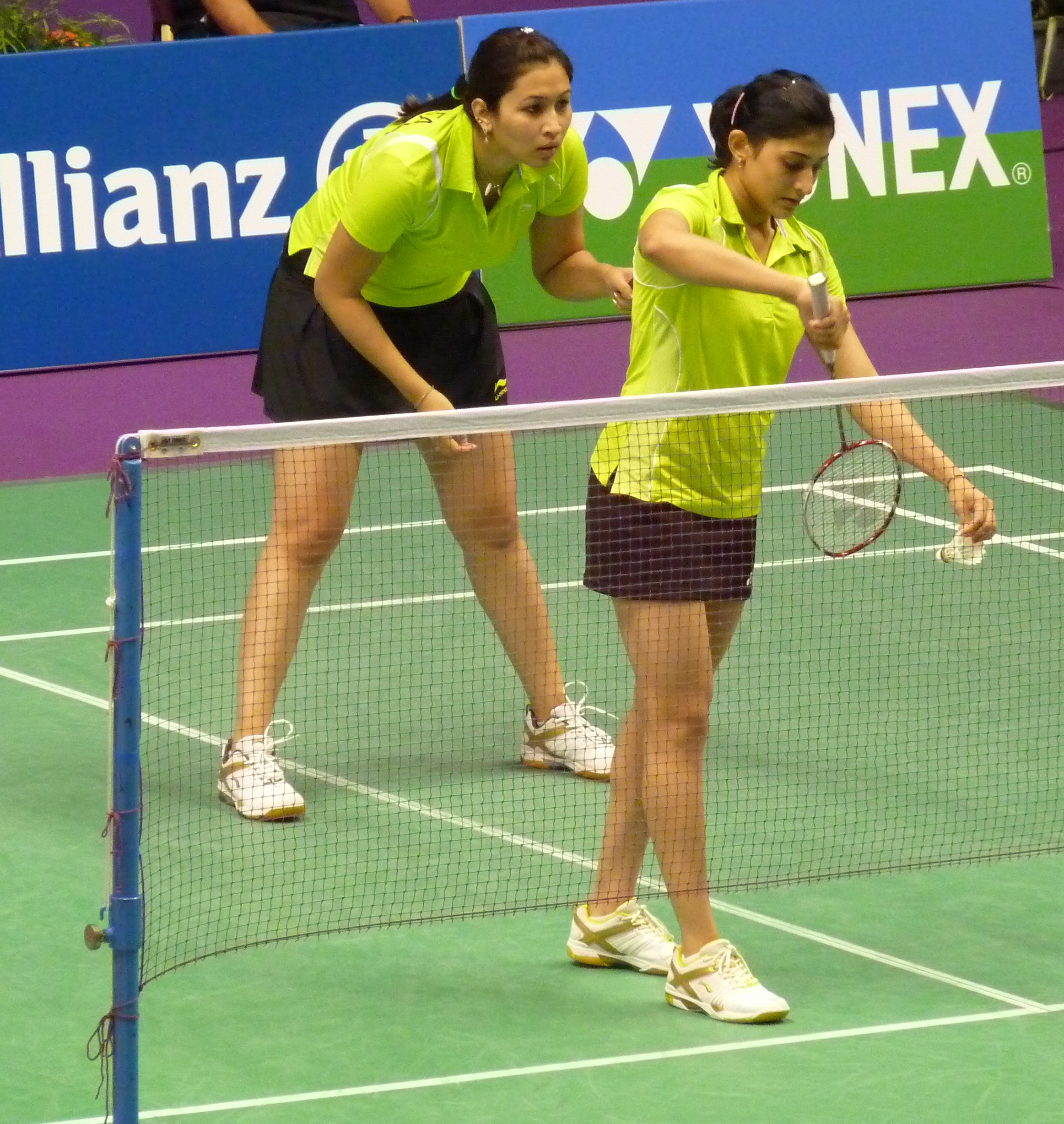
Ponnappa and Jwala Gutta at 2010 BWF World Championships

=== BWF World Championships ===
Women's doubles
Year	Venue	Partner	Opponent	Score	Result
2011	Wembley Arena, London, England	(India) Jwala Gutta	(China) Tian Qing (China) Zhao Yunlei	14–21, 16–21	Bronze

=== Commonwealth Games ===
Women's doubles
Year	Venue	Partner	Opponent	Score	Result
2010	Siri Fort Sports Complex; New Delhi, India	(India) Jwala Gutta	(Singapore) Shinta Mulia Sari (Singapore) Yao Lei	21–16, 21–19	Gold
2014	Emirates Arena; Glasgow, Scotland	(India) Jwala Gutta	(Malaysia) Vivian Hoo (Malaysia) Woon Khe Wei	17–21, 21–23	Silver
2018	Carrara Sports and Leisure Centre; Gold Coast, Australia	(India) N. Sikki Reddy	(Australia) Setyana Mapasa (Australia) Gronya Somerville	21–19, 21–19	Bronze

=== Asian Championships ===
Women's doubles
Year	Venue	Partner	Opponent	Score	Result
2014	Gimcheon Indoor Stadium; Gimcheon, South Korea	(India) Jwala Gutta	(China) Luo Ying (China) Luo Yu	12–21, 7–21	Bronze

=== South Asian Games ===
Women's doubles
Year	Venue	Partner	Opponent	Score	Result
2010	Wooden-Floor Gymnasium; Dhaka, Bangladesh	(India) P. C. Thulasi	(India) Aparna Balan (India) Shruti Kurien	19–21, 20–22	Silver
2016	Multipurpose Hall SAI-SAG Centre; Shillong, India	(India) Jwala Gutta	(India) N. Sikki Reddy (India) K. Maneesha	21–9, 21–17	Gold

Mixed doubles
Year	Venue	Partner	Opponent	Score	Result
2010	Wooden-Floor Gymnasium; Dhaka, Bangladesh	(India) Valiyaveetil Diju	(India) Sanave Thomas (India) Aparna Balan	21–11, 21–15	Gold
2016	Multipurpose Hall SAI-SAG Centre; Shillong, India	(India) Manu Attri	(India) Pranav Chopra (India) N. Sikki Reddy	29–30, 17–21	Silver

=== BWF World Tour (3 titles, 4 runners-up) ===
The BWF World Tour, which was announced on 19 March 2017 and implemented in 2018, is a series of elite badminton tournaments sanctioned by the Badminton World Federation (BWF). The BWF World Tours are divided into levels of World Tour Finals, Super 1000, Super 750, Super 500, Super 300 (part of the HSBC World Tour), and the BWF Tour Super 100.

Women's doubles
Year	Tournament	Level	Partner	Opponent	Score	Result
2018	Syed Modi International	Super 300	(India) N. Sikki Reddy	(Malaysia) Chow Mei Kuan (Malaysia) Lee Meng Yean	15–21, 13–21	(silver) Runner-up
2019	Hyderabad Open	Super 100	(India) N. Sikki Reddy	(South Korea) Baek Ha-na (South Korea) Jung Kyung-eun	17–21, 17–21	(silver) Runner-up
2023	Abu Dhabi Masters	Super 100	(India) Tanisha Crasto	(Denmark) Julie Finne-Ipsen (Denmark) Mai Surrow	21–16, 16–21, 21–8	(gold) Winner
2023	Syed Modi International	Super 300	(India) Tanisha Crasto	(Japan) Rin Iwanaga (Japan) Kie Nakanishi	14–21, 21–17, 15–21	(silver) Runner-up
2023	Guwahati Masters	Super 100	(India) Tanisha Crasto	(Chinese Taipei) Sung Shuo-yun (Chinese Taipei) Yu Chien-hui	21–13, 21–19	(gold) Winner
2023	Odisha Masters	Super 100	(India) Tanisha Crasto	(Indonesia) Meilysa Trias Puspita Sari (Indonesia) Rachel Allessya Rose	14–21, 17–21	(silver) Runner-up
2024	Guwahati Masters	Super 100	(India) Tanisha Crasto	(China) Li Huazhou (China) Wang Zimeng	21–18, 21–12	(gold) Winner

=== BWF Grand Prix (1 title, 3 runners-up) ===
The BWF Grand Prix had two levels, the Grand Prix and Grand Prix Gold. It was a series of badminton tournaments sanctioned by the Badminton World Federation (BWF) and played between 2007 and 2017.

Women's doubles
Year	Tournament	Partner	Opponent	Score	Result
2010	India Open	(India) Jwala Gutta	(Singapore) Shinta Mulia Sari (Singapore) Yao Lei	11–21, 21–9, 15–21	(silver) Runner-up
2015	Canada Open	(India) Jwala Gutta	(Netherlands) Eefje Muskens (Netherlands) Selena Piek	21–19, 21–16	(gold) Winner
2017	Syed Modi International	(India) N. Sikki Reddy	(Denmark) Christinna Pedersen (Denmark) Kamilla Rytter Juhl	16–21, 18–21	(silver) Runner-up

Mixed doubles
Year	Tournament	Partner	Opponent	Score	Result
2017	Syed Modi International	(India) B. Sumeeth Reddy	(India) Pranav Chopra (India) N. Sikki Reddy	20–22, 10–21	(silver) Runner-up

BWF Grand Prix Gold tournament
BWF Grand Prix tournament

=== BWF International Challenge/Series (2 titles, 7 runners-up) ===
Women's singles
Year	Tournament	Opponent	Score	Result
2008	Bahrain International	(India) Trupti Murgunde	16–21, 13–21	(silver) Runner-up

Women's doubles
Year	Tournament	Partner	Opponent	Score	Result
2013	Tata India International	(India) Jwala Gutta	(India) Pradnya Gadre (India) N. Sikki Reddy	19–21, 19–21	(silver) Runner-up
2016	Welsh International	(India) N. Sikki Reddy	(Russia) Anastasia Chervyakova (Russia) Olga Morozova	16–21, 11–21	(silver) Runner-up
2019	Maldives International	(India) N. Sikki Reddy	(Japan) Sayaka Hobara (Japan) Natsuki Sone	10–21, 21–17, 12–21	(silver) Runner-up
2021	Denmark Masters	(India) N. Sikki Reddy	(Denmark) Amalie Magelund (Denmark) Freja Ravn	21–15, 19–21, 14–21	(silver) Runner-up
2023	Nantes International	(India) Tanisha Crasto	(Chinese Taipei) Hung En-tzu (Chinese Taipei) Lin Yu-pei	21–15, 21–14	(gold) Winner

Mixed doubles
Year	Tournament	Partner	Opponent	Score	Result
2013	Tata India International	(India) Tarun Kona	(India) Akshay Dewalkar (India) Pradnya Gadre	17–21, 21–18, 18–21	(silver) Runner-up
2022 (III)	India International	(India) Sai Pratheek K.	(India) Rohan Kapoor (India) N. Sikki Reddy	21–16, 11–21, 21–18	(gold) Winner
2026 (II)	India International	(India) Sathish Karunakaran	(Individual Neutral Athletes) Rodion Alimov (Individual Neutral Athletes) Alina Davletova	21–19, 11–21, 13–21	(silver) Runner-up

BWF International Challenge tournament
BWF International Series tournament
BWF Future Series tournament

== Record against select opponents ==
Women's doubles results with Jwala Gutta against Super Series finalists, World Championships semifinalists, and Olympic quarterfinalists.

- (Australia) Leanne Choo & Renuga Veeran 1–0
- (China) Du Jing & Yu Yang 0–1
- (China) Tang Jinhua & Xia Huan 0–1
- (China) Ma Jin & Wang Xiaoli 0–2
- (China) Tian Qing & Zhao Yunlei 0–9
- (China) Wang Xiaoli & Yu Yang 0–4
- (China) Yang Wei & Zhang Jiewen 0–1
- (China) Luo Ying & Luo Yu 0–4
- (China) Ma Jin & Tang Yuanting 0–1
- (Chinese Taipei) Cheng Wen-hsing & Chien Yu-chin 2–2
- (Denmark) Christinna Pedersen & Kamilla Rytter Juhl 0–2
- (Hong Kong) Poon Lok Yan & Tse Ying Suet 1–1
- (Indonesia) Vita Marissa & Nadya Melati 2–1
- (Japan) Mizuki Fujii & Reika Kakiiwa 1–3
- (Japan) Miyuki Maeda & Satoko Suetsuna 1–4
- (Japan) Shizuka Matsuo & Mami Naito 0–3
- (Japan) Misaki Matsutomo & Ayaka Takahashi 0–2
- (South Korea) Ha Jung-eun & Kim Min-jung 0–3
- (South Korea) Lee Hyo-jung & Kim Min-jung 0–1
- (South Korea) Jung Kyung-eun & Kim Ha-na 1–2
- (Malaysia) Chin Eei Hui & Wong Pei Tty 0–5
- (Netherlands) Eefje Muskens & Selena Piek 2–2
- (Singapore) Shinta Mulia Sari & Yao Lei 2–4
- (Thailand) Duanganong Aroonkesorn & Kunchala Voravichitchaikul 2–0
- (Thailand) Puttita Supajirakul & Sapsiree Taerattanachai 2–0
