= Badminton at the South Asian Games =

Badminton Championships

Badminton competitions for the South Asian Games are being held since its inception at the 2004 South Asian Games, which was the 9th edition of South Asian Games.

== Venues ==
Yeat	Edition	Host city
2004	IX	Islamabad, Pakistan
2006	X	Colombo, Sri Lanka
2010	XI	Dhaka, Bangladesh
2016	XII	Shillong, India
2019	XIII	Pokhara, Nepal
2027	XIV	Pakistan

=== Locations ===
Host cities of Badminton at the South Asian Games

== Winners ==
Year	Men's singles	Women's singles	Men's doubles	Women's doubles	Mixed doubles	Men's team	Women's team
2004	(India) Chetan Anand	(India) Trupti Murgunde	(India) Rupesh Kumar K. T. (India) Marcos Bristow	(India) Jwala Gutta (India) Shruti Kurien	(India) Jaseel P. Ismail (India) Jwala Gutta	India	India
2006	(India) Chetan Anand	(India) Trupti Murgunde	(India) Rupesh Kumar K. T. (India) Sanave Thomas	(India) Jwala Gutta (India) Shruti Kurien	(India) Valiyaveetil Diju (India) Jwala Gutta	India	India
2010	(India) Chetan Anand	(India) Sayali Gokhale	(India) Rupesh Kumar K. T. (India) Sanave Thomas	(India) Aparna Balan (India) Shruti Kurien	(India) Valiyaveetil Diju (India) Ashwini Ponnappa	India	India
2016	(India) Srikanth Kidambi	(India) Ruthvika Gadde	(India) Manu Attri (India) B. Sumeeth Reddy	(India) Jwala Gutta (India) Ashwini Ponnappa	(India) Pranav Chopra (India) N. Sikki Reddy	India	India
2019	(India) Siril Verma	(India) Ashmita Chaliha	(India) Krishna Prasad Garaga (India) Dhruv Kapila	(Sri Lanka) Thilini Hendahewa (Sri Lanka) Kavidi Sirimannage	(India) Dhruv Kapila (India) Meghana Jakkampudi	India	India
2027							

== Medal table ==
Rank	Nation	Gold	Silver	Bronze	Total
1	India (IND)	34	21	3	58
2	Sri Lanka (SRI)	1	13	26	40
3	Pakistan (PAK)	0	1	21	22
4	Nepal (NEP)	0	0	12	12
5	Bangladesh (BAN)	0	0	6	6
Totals (5 entries)		35	35	68	138
