= Badminton at the 2016 South Asian Games – Men's team =

Badminton – Men's team at the 2016 South Asian Games
- Venue: NEIGRIHMS Indoor Stadium
- Dates: 6 – 8 February 2016

Medalists
gold medal	India
silver medal	Sri Lanka
bronze medal	Bangladesh
bronze medal	Pakistan

The men's team badminton event at the 2016 South Asian Games was held from 6 to 8 February at the NEIGRIHMS Indoor Stadium in Shillong.

== Schedule ==
All times are Indian Standard Time (UTC+05:30)

Date	Time	Event
Saturday, 6 February	10:00	Group stage
Saturday, 6 February	14:00	Group stage
Sunday, 7 February	13:00	Group stage
Monday, 8 February	10:00	Semi-finals
Monday, 8 February	14:30	Gold medal match

== Group stage ==
=== Group A ===
Pos	Team	Pld	W	L	MF	MA	MD	GF	GA	GD	PF	PA	PD	Pts	Qualification
1	India (H)	3	3	0	9	0	+9	18	0	+18	378	184	+194	3	Knockout stage
2	Bangladesh	3	2	1	6	3	+3	12	7	+5	350	307	+43	2	Knockout stage
3	Maldives	3	1	2	3	6	−3	7	12	−5	296	336	−40	1	
4	Afghanistan	3	0	3	0	9	−9	0	18	−18	181	378	−197	0	

Source: TS
(H) Host

India
3
NEIGRIHMS Indoor Stadium, Court 2
6 February 2016, 10:00

Maldives
0

			1	2	3
1	(India) (Maldives)	Srikanth Kidambi; Mohamed Ajfan Rasheed	21; 17	21; 12
2	(India) (Maldives)	Ajay Jayaram; Hussein Zayan Shaheed	21; 8	21; 5
3	(India) (Maldives)	Manu Attri / B. Sumeeth Reddy; Mohamed Ajfan Rasheed / Hussein Zayan Shaheed	21; 8	21; 10
4	(India) (Maldives)	Prannoy H. S. Hussain Rifau				not played
5	(India) (Maldives)	Pranav Chopra / Akshay Dewalkar; Ahmed Thoif Mohamed / Hussain Rifau				not played

Bangladesh
3
NEIGRIHMS Indoor Stadium, Court 3
6 February 2016, 10:00

Afghanistan
0

			1	2	3
1	(Bangladesh) (Afghanistan)	Md. Rahad Kabir Khaled; Sayed Mohd Kabir Mirzad	21; 11	21; 11
2	(Bangladesh) (Afghanistan)	Ahsan Habib Parash; Ahmed Fahim Yari	21; 11	21; 14
3	(Bangladesh) (Afghanistan)	Mohammad Anamul Haque / Ahsan Habib Parash; Sayed Imran Miri / Ahmed Fahim Yari	21; 10	21; 14
4	(Bangladesh) (Afghanistan)	Md. Rais Uddin; Sayed Imran Miri				not played
5	(Bangladesh) (Afghanistan)	Ayman Jaman / Md Rais Uddin; Sayed Imran Miri / Sayed Mohd Kabir Mirzad				not played

India
3
NEIGRIHMS Indoor Stadium, Court 1
6 February 2016, 14:00

Bangladesh
0

			1	2	3
1	(India) (Bangladesh)	Prannoy H. S. Ayman Jaman	21; 14	21; 13
2	(India) (Bangladesh)	B. Sai Praneeth; Md. Rais Uddin	21; 17	21; 18
3	(India) (Bangladesh)	Manu Attri / B. Sumeeth Reddy; Ayman Jaman / Md. Rais Uddin	21; 8	21; 9
4	(India) (Bangladesh)	Akshay Dewalkar; Jamil Ahmed Dulal				not played
5	(India) (Bangladesh)	Pranav Chopra / Akshay Dewalkar; Jamil Ahmed Dulal / Md. Rahad Kabir Khaled				not played

Maldives
3
NEIGRIHMS Indoor Stadium, Court 2
6 February 2016, 14:00

Afghanistan
0

			1	2	3
1	(Maldives) (Afghanistan)	Mohamed Ajfan Rasheed; Sayed Mohd Kabir Mirzad	21; 4	21; 11
2	(Maldives) (Afghanistan)	Hussein Zayan Shaheed; Ahmed Fahim Yari	21; 11	21; 10
3	(Maldives) (Afghanistan)	Mohamed Ajfan Rasheed / Hussein Zayan Shaheed; Sayed Imran Miri / Ahmed Fahim Yari	21; 18	21; 11
4	(Maldives) (Afghanistan)	Hussain Rifau; Sayed Imran Miri				not played
5	(Maldives) (Afghanistan)	Ahmed Thoif Mohamed / Hussain Rifau; Sayed Imran Miri / Sayed Mohd Kabir Mirzad				not played

Bangladesh
3
NEIGRIHMS Indoor Stadium, Court 2
7 February 2016, 13:00

Maldives
0

			1	2	3
1	(Bangladesh) (Maldives)	Ahsan Habib Parash; Mohamed Ajfan Rasheed	19; 21	21; 14	21; 17
2	(Bangladesh) (Maldives)	Ayman Jaman; Hussein Zayan Shaheed	21; 19	21; 11
3	(Bangladesh) (Maldives)	Mohammad Anamul Haque / Ahsan Habib Parash; Mohamed Ajfan Rasheed / Hussein Zayan Shaheed	21; 15	21; 13
4	(Bangladesh) (Maldives)	Md. Rais Uddin; Ahmed Thoif Mohamed				not played
5	(Bangladesh) (Maldives)	Jamil Ahmed Dulal / Md. Rahad Kabir Khaled; Ahmed Thoif Mohamed / Hussain Rifau				not played

India
3
NEIGRIHMS Indoor Stadium, Court 4
7 February 2016, 13:00

Afghanistan
0

			1	2	3
1	(India) (Afghanistan)	Ajay Jayaram; Sayed Mohd Kabir Mirzad	21; 4	21; 4
2	(India) (Afghanistan)	Prannoy H. S. Ahmed Fahim Yari	21; 8	21; 11
3	(India) (Afghanistan)	Pranav Chopra / Akshay Dewalkar; Sayed Imran Miri / Ahmed Fahim Yari	21; 9	21; 9
4	(India) (Afghanistan)	B. Sai Praneeth; Sayed Imran Miri				not played
5	(India) (Afghanistan)	Ajay Jayaram / Prannoy H. S. Sayed Imran Miri / Sayed Mohd Kabir Mirzad				not played

=== Group B ===
Pos	Team	Pld	W	L	MF	MA	MD	GF	GA	GD	PF	PA	PD	Pts	Qualification
1	Sri Lanka	3	3	0	9	0	+9	18	1	+17	397	258	+139	3	Knockout stage
2	Pakistan	3	2	1	6	5	+1	15	11	+4	493	442	+51	2	Knockout stage
3	Nepal	3	1	2	5	6	−1	11	14	−3	454	446	+8	1	
4	Bhutan	3	0	3	0	9	−9	0	18	−18	180	378	−198	0	

Source: TS

Pakistan
3
NEIGRIHMS Indoor Stadium, Court 1
6 February 2016, 10:00

Nepal
2

			1	2	3
1	(Pakistan) (Nepal)	Muhammad Irfan Saeed Bhatti; Ratnajit Tamang	21; 17	19; 21	17; 21
2	(Pakistan) (Nepal)	Murad Ali; Bikash Shrestha	15; 21	21; 19	21; 15
3	(Pakistan) (Nepal)	Sulehri Kashif Ali / Rizwan Azam; Dipesh Dhami / Ratnajit Tamang	21; 15	21; 17
4	(Pakistan) (Nepal)	Azeem Sarwar; Dipesh Dhami	21; 17	15; 21	19; 21
5	(Pakistan) (Nepal)	Muhammad Irfan Saeed Bhatti / Azeem Sarwar; Bishnu Katuwal / Bikash Shrestha	21; 16	21; 13

Sri Lanka
3
NEIGRIHMS Indoor Stadium, Court 4
6 February 2016, 10:00

Bhutan
0

			1	2	3
1	(Sri Lanka) (Bhutan)	Buwaneka Goonethilleka; Karma Chendru	21; 4	21; 12
2	(Sri Lanka) (Bhutan)	Sachin Dias; Ugyen Choeda	21; 6	21; 11
3	(Sri Lanka) (Bhutan)	Sachin Dias / Buwaneka Goonethilleka; Gazin Wangchuk / Pema Thinlex	21; 9	21; 8
4	(Sri Lanka) (Bhutan)	Vibavi Madusha Kukulage; Pema Thinlex				not played
5	(Sri Lanka) (Bhutan)	Vibavi Madusha Kukulage / Nimmika Thisara; Karma Chendru / Ugyen Choeda				not played

Sri Lanka
3
NEIGRIHMS Indoor Stadium, Court 3
6 February 2016, 14:00

Nepal
0

			1	2	3
1	(Sri Lanka) (Nepal)	Buwaneka Goonethilleka; Ratnajit Tamang	21; 11	21; 17
2	(Sri Lanka) (Nepal)	Sachin Dias; Bikash Shrestha	21; 15	21; 16
3	(Sri Lanka) (Nepal)	Sachin Dias / Buwaneka Goonethilleka; Dipesh Dhami / Ratnajit Tamang	21; 18	21; 17
4	(Sri Lanka) (Nepal)	Vibavi Madusha Kukulage; Dipesh Dhami				not played
5	(Sri Lanka) (Nepal)	Vibavi Madusha Kukulage / Nimmika Thisara; Bishnu Katuwal / Bikash Shrestha				not played

Pakistan
3
NEIGRIHMS Indoor Stadium, Court 4
6 February 2016, 14:00

Bhutan
0

			1	2	3
1	(Pakistan) (Bhutan)	Muhammad Irfan Saeed Bhatti; Karma Chendru	21; 10	21; 11
2	(Pakistan) (Bhutan)	Murad Ali; Ugyen Choeda	21; 13	21; 9
3	(Pakistan) (Bhutan)	Sulehri Kashif Ali / Rizwan Azam; Gazin Wangchuk / Pema Thinlex	21; 10	21; 10
4	(Pakistan) (Bhutan)	Azeem Sarwar; Pema Thinlex
5	(Pakistan) (Bhutan)	Muhammad Irfan Saeed Bhatti / Azeem Sarwar; Karma Chendru / Ugyen Choeda				not played

Nepal
3
NEIGRIHMS Indoor Stadium, Court 1
7 February 2016, 13:00

Bhutan
0

			1	2	3
1	(Nepal) (Bhutan)	Ratnajit Tamang; Ugyen Choeda	21; 11	21; 16
2	(Nepal) (Bhutan)	Bikash Shrestha; Pema Thinlex	21; 5	21; 17
3	(Nepal) (Bhutan)	Dipesh Dhami / Ratnajit Tamang; Gazin Wangchuk / Pema Thinlex	21; 18	21; 17
4	(Nepal) (Bhutan)	Dipesh Dhami; Gazin Wangchuk				not played
5	(Nepal) (Bhutan)	Bishnu Katuwal / Bikash Shrestha; Karma Chendru / Ugyen Choeda				not played

Sri Lanka
3
NEIGRIHMS Indoor Stadium, Court 3
7 February 2016, 13:00

Pakistan
0

			1	2	3
1	(Sri Lanka) (Pakistan)	Buwaneka Goonethilleka; Muhammad Irfan Saeed Bhatti	21; 9	21; 12
2	(Sri Lanka) (Pakistan)	Sachin Dias; Murad Ali	25; 23	15; 21	21; 15
3	(Sri Lanka) (Pakistan)	Sachin Dias / Buwaneka Goonethilleka; Sulehri Kashif Ali / Rizwan Azam	21; 18	21; 16
4	(Sri Lanka) (Pakistan)	Vibavi Madusha Kukulage; Azeem Sarwar				not played
5	(Sri Lanka) (Pakistan)	Vibavi Madusha Kukulage / Nimmika Thisara; Muhammad Irfan Saeed Bhatti / Azeem Sarwar				not played

== Knockout stage ==
Semi-finals
A1	India	3
B2	Pakistan	0
A2	Bangladesh	0
B1	Sri Lanka	3

Gold medal match
A1	India	3
B1	Sri Lanka	0

=== Semi-finals ===
India
3
NEIGRIHMS Indoor Stadium, Court 1
8 February 2016, 10:00

Pakistan
0

			1	2	3
1	(India) (Pakistan)	Srikanth Kidambi; Muhammad Irfan Saeed Bhatti	21; 19	21; 15
2	(India) (Pakistan)	Ajay Jayaram; Murad Ali	21; 11	21; 16
3	(India) (Pakistan)	Manu Attri / B. Sumeeth Reddy; Sulehri Kashif Ali / Rizwan Azam	21; 9	21; 18
4	(India) (Pakistan)	Prannoy H. S. Azeem Sarwar				not played
5	(India) (Pakistan)	Pranav Chopra / Akshay Dewalkar; Muhammad Irfan Saeed Bhatti / Azeem Sarwar				not played

Sri Lanka
3
NEIGRIHMS Indoor Stadium, Court 2
8 February 2016, 10:00

Bangladesh
0

			1	2	3
1	(Sri Lanka) (Bangladesh)	Buwaneka Goonethilleka; Ahsan Habib Parash	21; 13	21; 10
2	(Sri Lanka) (Bangladesh)	Sachin Dias; Ayman Jaman	21; 12	21; 15
3	(Sri Lanka) (Bangladesh)	Sachin Dias / Buwaneka Goonethilleka; Mohammad Anamul Haque / Ahsan Habib Parash	21; 16	21; 14
4	(Sri Lanka) (Bangladesh)	Vibavi Madusha Kukulage; Md. Rais Uddin				not played
5	(Sri Lanka) (Bangladesh)	Vibavi Madusha Kukulage / Nimmika Thisara; Jamil Ahmed Dulal / Md. Rahad Kabir Khaled				not played

=== Gold medal match ===
India
3
NEIGRIHMS Indoor Stadium, Court 1
8 February 2016, 14:30

Sri Lanka
0

			1	2	3
1	(India) (Sri Lanka)	Srikanth Kidambi; Buwaneka Goonethilleka	21; 14	21; 14
2	(India) (Sri Lanka)	Prannoy H. S. Sachin Dias	21; 13	21; 16
3	(India) (Sri Lanka)	Manu Attri / B. Sumeeth Reddy; Sachin Dias / Buwaneka Goonethilleka	21; 12	21; 11
4	(India) (Sri Lanka)	B. Sai Praneeth; Vibavi Madusha Kukulage				not played
5	(India) (Sri Lanka)	Pranav Chopra / Akshay Dewalkar; Vibavi Madusha Kukulage / Nimmika Thisara				not played
