= Pakistan at the 1991 South Asian Games =

- IOC code: PAK
- NOC: Pakistan Olympic Association

in Colombo
- Medals Ranked 3rd: Gold 28 Silver 32 Bronze 25 Total 85

South Asian Games appearances (overview)
- 1984; 1985; 1987; 1989; 1991; 1993; 1995; 1999; 2004; 2006; 2010; 2016; 2019; 2025

Pakistan participated in the 5th South Asian Games held in Colombo, Sri Lanka in 1991. These games saw women athletes participate for the first time in athletics, table tennis and tennis. Men participated in all the 10 sports: athletics, basketball, boxing, football, shooting, swimming, table tennis, tennis, volleyball, and weightlifting. Its medal tally of 85 placed it third amongst the seven nations. Weightlifting was its most successful event, where it won 30 medals (11 gold, 16 silver, 3 bronze).

== Athletes ==
1. Athletics:
2. Basketball:
3. Boxing:
4. Football:
5. Shooting:
6. Swimming:
7. Table Tennis:
8. Tennis:
9. Volleyball:
10. Weightlifting:
