= Pakistan at the 1989 South Asian Games =

- IOC code: PAK
- NOC: Pakistan Olympic Association

in Islamabad
- Medals Ranked 2nd: Gold 42 Silver 33 Bronze 22 Total 97

South Asian Games appearances (overview)
- 1984; 1985; 1987; 1989; 1991; 1993; 1995; 1999; 2004; 2006; 2010; 2016; 2019; 2025

Pakistan was the host nation for the 4th South Asian Games held in its capital, Islamabad between 20 and 27 October 1989. The country participated in all of the 10 sports: athletics, boxing, kabaddi, squash, swimming, table tennis, volleyball, weightlifting and wrestling. Its medal tally of 97 placed it second amongst the seven nations. Weightlifting was again its most successful event, where it won 28 medals (10 gold, 14 silver, 4 bronze) with athletics a close second with 27 medals (11 gold, 8 silver, 8 bronze).

== Notable Athletes ==
1. Athletics: Jamshed Awan, Fatima Daud, Ibrahim Latif
2. Boxing: TJ Jilani, Sultan Nasir, Abdul Qayum Haider
3. Football:
4. Kabaddi: Saeen Ishfaaq, Qutubudin Awan, Nasir Ali rizwi
5. Squash: Jansher Khan, Jehangir Khan
6. Swimming: Furqaan Ahmaed
7. Table Tennis: Samina Jaffery, Quratul-ain
8. Volleyball: Qaiser Mustafa
9. Weightlifting: Shujja Hashmi, Ali Azam Pasha
10. Wrestling: Shahid Pervaiz Butt
