= Pakistan at the 1987 South Asian Games =

- IOC code: PAK
- NOC: Pakistan Olympic Association

in Calcutta
- Medals Ranked 2nd: Gold 16 Silver 36 Bronze 14 Total 66

South Asian Games appearances (overview)
- 1984; 1985; 1987; 1989; 1991; 1993; 1995; 1999; 2004; 2006; 2010; 2016; 2019; 2025

Pakistan participated in the 3rd South Asian Games held in Calcutta, India in November 1987. The country participated in all of the 10 sports: athletics, basketball, boxing, football, kabaddi, swimming, table tennis, volleyball, weightlifting and wrestling. Its medal tally of 66 placed it second amongst the seven nations. Weightlifting was its most successful event, where it won 29 medals (6 gold, 23 silver).

== Athletes ==
1. Athletics:
2. Basketball:
3. Boxing:
4. Football:
5. Kabaddi:
6. Swimming:
7. Table Tennis:
8. Volleyball: Qaiser Mustafa
9. Weightlifting:
10. Wrestling:
