= Pakistan at the 2006 South Asian Games =

- IOC code: PAK
- NOC: Pakistan Olympic Association

in Colombo
- Medals Ranked 3rd: Gold 41 Silver 43 Bronze 72 Total 156

South Asian Games appearances (overview)
- 1984; 1985; 1987; 1989; 1991; 1993; 1995; 1999; 2004; 2006; 2010; 2016; 2019; 2025

Pakistan participated in the 2006 South Asian Games in Colombo, Sri Lanka from 18 August to 28 August 2006.

== Medal summary ==
Pakistan won 41 gold medals from a total of 216 medals.

=== Medal table ===
Sport	Gold	Silver	Bronze	Total
Weightlifting	6	2	0	8
Wrestling	6	1	0	7
Shooting	5	5	11	21
Boxing	5	3	0	8
Karate	5	2	4	11
Athletics	3	4	13	20
Taekwondo	3	3	6	12
Wushu	2	4	1	7
Squash	2	1	1	4
Judo	1	4	6	11
Cycling	1	1	3	5
Field hockey	1	0	0	1
Football	1	0	0	1
Rowing	0	7	0	7
Swimming	0	5	15	20
Kabaddi	0	1	0	1
Badminton	0	0	6	6
Table tennis	0	0	5	5
Volleyball	0	0	1	1
Archery	0	0	0	0
Handball	0	0	0	0
Totals (21 entries)	41	43	72	156
