= Pakistan at the 1985 South Asian Games =

- IOC code: PAK
- NOC: Pakistan Olympic Association

in Dhaka
- Medals Ranked 2nd: Gold 21 Silver 26 Bronze 12 Total 59

South Asian Games appearances (overview)
- 1984; 1985; 1987; 1989; 1991; 1993; 1995; 1999; 2004; 2006; 2010; 2016; 2019; 2025

Pakistan participated in the 2nd South Asian Games held in Dhaka, Bangladesh between 26 and 20 December 1985. Its medal tally of 59 placed it second amongst the seven nations. The country participated in the following sports: athletics, boxing, kabaddi, swimming, weightlifting and wrestling.

== Athletes ==
1. Athletics:
2. Boxing:
3. Kabaddi:
4. Swimming:
5. Weightlifting:
6. Wrestling:
