= Pakistan at the South Asian Games =

- IOC code: PAK
- NOC: Pakistan Olympic Association
- Medals Ranked 2nd: Gold 297 Silver 421 Bronze 432 Total 1,150

South Asian Games appearances (overview)
- 1984; 1985; 1987; 1989; 1991; 1993; 1995; 1999; 2004; 2006; 2010; 2016; 2019; 2025

Pakistan is a member of the South Asian Zone of the Olympic Council of Asia (OCA) and has participated in the South Asian Games since the inception of the game in 1984. The Pakistan Olympic Association (POA), formed in 1948, and was affiliated by the International Olympic Committee in the same year.

Pakistan has participated all 13 South Asian Games governed by South Asia Olympic Council.

Pakistan has performed reasonably well since 1984 Kathmandu. Pakistan has been second-ranked team 7 times, third ranked team 4 times, fourth ranked team 2 times.

Best performance witnessed by Pakistan was in 2006 Colombo with 158 total Medals including 43 Gold Medals.

== Hosted Games ==
Islamabad, the capital of Pakistan has hosted the South Asian Games twice: 1989 Islamabad, 2004 Islamabad

Pakistan will host 2027 South Asian Games at Lahore.

== Detailed Medals Count ==
A red box around the year indicates the games were hosted by Pakistan.

Note : Updated Medal Table after Doping Results

Games	Rank	Gold	Silver	Bronze	Total
(Nepal) 1984 Kathmandu	3	5	3	2	10
(Bangladesh) 1985 Dhaka	2	21	26	12	59
(India) 1987 Calcutta	2	16	36	14	66
(Pakistan) 1989 Islamabad	2	42	33	22	97
(Sri Lanka) 1991 Colombo	3	28	32	25	85
(Bangladesh) 1993 Dhaka	2	23	22	20	65
(India) 1995 Madras	3	10	33	36	79
(Nepal) 1999 Kathmandu	4	10	36	30	76
(Pakistan) 2004 Islamabad	2	38	55	50	143
(Sri Lanka) 2006 Colombo	2	43	44	71	158
(Bangladesh) 2010 Dhaka	2	19	25	36	80
(India) 2016 Guwahati / Shillong	3	12	35	57	104
(Nepal) 2019 Kathmandu–Pokhara	4	30	41	57	128
(Pakistan) 2025 Lahore	Future event				
Total	2	297	421	432	1150

== See also ==
- Doping at the South Asian Games
