= Pakistan at the 1984 South Asian Games =

- IOC code: PAK
- NOC: Pakistan Olympic Association

in Kathmandu
- Medals Ranked 3rd: Gold 5 Silver 3 Bronze 2 Total 10

South Asian Games appearances (overview)
- 1984; 1985; 1987; 1989; 1991; 1993; 1995; 1999; 2004; 2006; 2010; 2016; 2019; 2025

Pakistan participated in the 1st South Asian Games held in Kathmandu, Nepal in September 1984. Its medal tally of 10 placed it third amongst the seven nations.

== Athletes ==
1. Athletics: Haider Ali Shah; Muhammad Munir
2. Boxing: Asghar Ali; Ilyas Ahmed; Syed Hussain Shah; Muhammad Yousaf
3. Weightlifting: Ghulam Dastagir Butt; Abid Yousaf; Adib Akram
