= Pakistan at the 2004 South Asian Games =

- IOC code: PAK
- NOC: Pakistan Olympic Association

in Islamabad
- Medals Ranked 2nd: Gold 38 Silver 55 Bronze 50 Total 143

South Asian Games appearances (overview)
- 1984; 1985; 1987; 1989; 1991; 1993; 1995; 1999; 2004; 2006; 2010; 2016; 2019; 2025

Pakistan was the host nation for the second time when the 9th South Asian Games were held in its capital, Islamabad between 29 March and 7 April 2004. The country participated in all 15 sports. Its medal tally of 143 placed it second amongst the seven nations. Swimming was its most successful event, where it won 27 medals (13 silver, 14 bronze), though without any gold. Athletics were a close second with 25 medals (5 gold, 8 silver, 12 bronze) and shooting third with 24 medals (2 gold, 14 silver, 8 bronze). It won the most golds in boxing with 9.

== Athletes ==
1. Athletics:
2. Badminton:
3. Boxing:
4. Football:
5. Kabaddi:
6. Karate:
7. Rowing:
8. Shooting:
9. Squash:
10. Swimming:
11. Table Tennis:
12. Taekwondo:
13. Volleyball:
14. Weightlifting:
15. Wrestling:
