= Pakistan at the 2016 South Asian Games =

- IOC code: PAK
- NOC: Pakistan Olympic Association

in Guwahati and Shillong
- Competitors: 337
- Medals Ranked 3rd: Gold 12 Silver 35 Bronze 57 Total 104

South Asian Games appearances (overview)
- 1984; 1985; 1987; 1989; 1991; 1993; 1995; 1999; 2004; 2006; 2010; 2016; 2019; 2025

Pakistan participated in the 2016 South Asian Games in Guwahati and Shillong, India from 5 February to 16 February 2016.

== Medal summary ==
Pakistan won 12 gold medals from a total of 104 medals.

=== Medal table ===
Sport	Gold	Silver	Bronze	Total
Wrestling	2	4	1	7
Judo	2	2	8	12
Wushu	2	2	6	10
Taekwondo	2	1	4	7
Swimming	1	2	5	8
Weightlifting	1	2	4	7
Squash	1	2	1	4
Field hockey	1	0	0	1
Shooting	0	9	4	13
Boxing	0	4	2	6
Athletics	0	3	8	11
Cycling	0	1	3	4
Handball	0	1	1	2
Table tennis	0	1	1	2
Kabaddi	0	1	0	1
Badminton	0	0	4	4
Tennis	0	0	4	4
Volleyball	0	0	1	1
Archery	0	0	0	0
Football	0	0	0	0
Kho-Kho	0	0	0	0
Triathlon	0	0	0	0
Totals (22 entries)	12	35	57	104
