= Afghanistan national badminton team =

National badminton team representing Afghanistan

The Afghanistan national badminton team (Pashto: د افغانستان د بیډمنټن ملي لوبډله) represents Afghanistan in international badminton team competitions. It is controlled by the Badminton Federation of Afghanistan and competes under the South Asian region. Afghanistan competed in the Asian Games individual event. The Afghan junior team has competed in the BWF World Junior Championships mixed team event, also known as the Suhandinata Cup. The team finished in 34th place.

== History ==
The Afghanistan badminton team was formed in 1974. The team, along with the Badminton Federation of Afghanistan were dissolved for a brief period of time during the Afghan War but were later revived in 2002. The national team have had trouble in competing international tournaments as the team lacked equipment and funding from the National Olympic Committee of the Islamic Republic of Afghanistan.

=== Men's team ===
Afghanistan first competed in the 2016 South Asian Games. The team were drawn into Group A with India, Bangladesh and Maldives. The team lost all of their matches and were eliminated in the group stage.

=== Women's team ===
The Afghani women's team competed in the 2016 South Asian Games. They were drawn into Group A with India and Nepal. The team failed to qualify for the knockout stage after losing 3–0 to India and Nepal in the group stage.

== Competitive record ==
=== Thomas Cup ===
Year	Round	Pos
1949 to 2024	Did not enter	
2026	To be determined	
2028	To be determined	
2030	To be determined	

=== Uber Cup ===
Year	Round	Pos
1957 to 2024	Did not enter	
2026	To be determined	
2028	To be determined	
2030	To be determined	

=== Sudirman Cup ===
Year	Round	Pos
1989 to 2025	Did not enter	
2027	To be determined	
2029	To be determined	

=== Asian Games ===
==== Men's team ====
Year	Round	Pos
1962 to 2022	Did not enter	
2026	To be determined	
2030	To be determined	
2034	To be determined	
2038	To be determined	

==== Women's team ====
Year	Round	Pos
1962 to 2022	Did not enter	
2026	To be determined	
2030	To be determined	
2034	To be determined	
2038	To be determined	

=== Asian Team Championships ===
==== Men's team ====
Year	Round	Pos
1962 to 2024	Did not enter	
2026	To be determined	
2028	To be determined	
2030	To be determined	

==== Women's team ====
Year	Round	Pos
2016 to 2024	Did not enter	
2026	To be determined	
2028	To be determined	
2030	To be determined	

==== Mixed team ====
Year	Round	Pos
2017 to 2023	Did not enter	
2025	To be determined	
2027	To be determined	
2029	To be determined	

=== South Asian Games ===
==== Men's team ====
Year	Round	Pos
2004	Did not enter	
2006	Did not enter	
2010	Did not enter	
2016	Group stage	
2019	Did not enter	
2025	To be determined	

==== Women's team ====
Year	Round	Pos
2004	Did not enter	
2006	Did not enter	
2010	Did not enter	
2016	Group stage	
2019	Did not enter	
2025	To be determined	

=== Islamic Solidarity Games ===
==== Men's team ====
Year	Result	Pos
2013	Did not enter	

==== Women's team ====
Year	Result	Pos
2013	Did not enter	

=== Women's Islamic Games ===
==== Women's team ====
Year	Round	Pos
1993	Did not enter	
1997	Group stage	9th
2001	Sixth place	6th
2005	Did not enter	

**Red border color indicates tournament was held on home soil.

== Junior competitive record ==
=== Suhandinata Cup ===
Year	Round	Pos
2000 to 2013	Did not enter	
2014	Withdrew	
2015	Did not enter	
2016	Did not enter	
2017	Did not enter	
2018	Did not enter	
2019	Did not enter	
2022	Did not enter	
2023	Did not enter	
2024	Did not enter	

=== Asian Junior Team Championships ===
==== Boys' team ====
Year	Round	Pos
1997	Did not enter	
1998	Did not enter	
1999	Did not enter	
2000	Did not enter	
2001	Did not enter	
2002	Did not enter	
2004	Did not enter	
2005	Did not enter	

==== Girls' team ====
Year	Round	Pos
1997	Did not enter	
1998	Did not enter	
1999	Did not enter	
2000	Did not enter	
2001	Did not enter	
2002	Did not enter	
2004	Did not enter	
2005	Did not enter	

==== Mixed team ====
Year	Round	Pos
2006	Did not enter	
2007	Did not enter	
2008	Did not enter	
2009	Did not enter	
2010	Did not enter	
2011	Did not enter	
2012	Did not enter	
2013	Did not enter	
2014	Did not enter	
2015	Did not enter	
2016	Did not enter	
2017	Did not enter	
2018	Did not enter	
2019	Did not enter	
2023	Did not enter	
2024	Did not enter	
2025	To be determined	

=== South Asian Junior Team Championships ===
==== Mixed team ====
Year	Round	Pos
2019	Did not enter	

**Red border color indicates tournament was held on home soil.

== Players ==
=== Current squad ===
As of 2 April 2024

==== Men's team ====
Name	DoB/Age	Ranking of event		
Name	DoB/Age	MS	MD	XD
Asadullah Samim	27 Jul 2001 (age 25)			
Hasibullha Nazari	22 April 1998 (age 28)	-	-	-
Nematullah Habibi	24 June 2000 (age 26)	-	-	-
Najibullah Yousufi	29 November 1999 (age 26)	-	-	-
Elyas Gharman	5 May 2001 (age 25)	-	-	-
Sabawoon Gulzad	28 December 2001 (age 24)	-	-	-

==== Women's team ====
Name	DoB/Age	Ranking of event		
Name	DoB/Age	WS	WD	XD
Maryam Afshar	26 Oct 2000 (age 26)			
Shabana Afshar	19 May 1996 (age 30)	-	-	-
Lidaa Saraj	6 March 1998 (age 28)	-	-	-
Zainab Yari	22 August 2001 (age 25)	-	-	-
