= Pakistan at the 2019 South Asian Games =

- IOC code: PAK
- NOC: Pakistan Olympic Association

in Kathmandu and Pokhara, Nepal
- Competitors: 263
- Medals Ranked 4th: Gold 30 Silver 41 Bronze 57 Total 128

South Asian Games appearances (overview)
- 1984; 1985; 1987; 1989; 1991; 1993; 1995; 1999; 2004; 2006; 2010; 2016; 2019; 2025

Pakistan competed in the 2019 South Asian Games in Kathmandu and Pokhara, Nepal from 1 to 10 December 2019. It participated in tennis, table tennis, athletics, handball, taekwondo, kabaddi, badminton, swimming, karate, wrestling, weightlifting, boxing, squash, volleyball, judo and wushu.

== Badminton ==
Pakistan Badminton Federation announced a 5-member men's team for these Games.

1. Murad Ali
2. Awais Zahid
3. Raja Husnain
4. Muqeet Tahir
5. Attique Ch

Women's team: Mahoor Shahzad, Palwasha Bashir, Sehra Akram, Huma Javeed, Ghazala Siddique and Bushra Qayyum.

== Fencing ==
Both men and women's teams competed in all three styles, winning 2 bronze medals in men's épée (singles and team).

Squad: Iqra Asif, Khadija Fatima, Fariha Haneef, Sidra Ashraf, Ali Saeeduddin, Mehmood Sharif, Muhammad Sharif, Khalid, Nazar Abbas, Zaheer Mushtaq and Kashif Ali.

== Handball ==
The team won the gold medal beating India in the final.

Members: Ali Asif, Hussain Muzammal, Bashir Muhammad Sahid, Saeed Asim, Ali Muaaz, Zubair Muhammad, Hussain Hazrat, Hussain Umar, Hayat Asif, Hussain Nasir, Naveed Ur Rehman, Atif Muhammad Uzair, Khan Imran and Ashraf Muhammad Mubeen.

== Judo ==
Both men's and women's team competed. The squad consisted of Shah Hussain Shah, Hamid Ali, Qaiser Khan, Karamat Butt, Beenish Khan, Humaira Ashiq, Amina Toyoda and Mohammad Hasnain.

== Karate ==
Both men's women's teams competed. The squad consisted of Iqra Anwar (-45 kg), Sabira Gul (-50 kg), Sana Kausar (-55 kg), Naz Gul (-61 kg), Kulsoom (-68 kg), Nargis (+68 kg), Shahida (Individual Kata), Nouman Ahmed (-50 kg), Murad Khan (-55 kKG), Zafar Iqbal (-60 kg), Naseer Ahmed (-67 kg), Saadi Abbas (-75 kg), Mohammad Awais (-84 kg), Baz Mohammad (+84 kg), Rehman Ullah (Team Kumite), Shehbaz Khan (Team Kumite), Niamat Ullah (Individual Kata).

== Squash ==
After trials, a 4-member women's team was selected. Members are:

1. Faiza Zafar,
2. Amna Fayyaz,
3. Madina Zafar
4. Muqadas Ashraf

== Taekwondo ==
Both men's and women's teams competed. Squad consisted of Mehrun Nisa, Shabaz Ahmed, Mohammad Mumtaz, Asifa Ali, Muhammad Waseem Javed, Syeda Aleena Batool, Sophiya Nayab Baig, Phool Zaheer, Iqra Zaheer, Muhammad Anas, Wajeehul Hassar and Muhammad Hizer Khan.

== Tennis ==
After trials, Pakistan Tennis Federation (PTF) announced a 4-member women's team.

1. Ushna Suhail
2. Sara Mansoor
3. Sarah Mahboob
4. Mahin Aftab

== Volleyball ==
Men's squad: Aimal Khan ), Abdullah, Mubashir Raza, Mohammad Idrees, (captain) Mohammad Kashif Naved, Murad, Abdul Zaheer, Fahad Raza, Nasir Ali, Usman Faryad Ali, Farooq Haider, Hamid Yazman, Mohammad Usman.

== Weightlifting ==
Both men's and women's squad's were sent to the games.

Men: Talib Talha, Sufyan Abu, Ali Haider, Rehman Abdur, Zhuaib, Rothore Usman Amjad, Butt Hanzala Dastgir, Butt Muhammad Nooh Dastgir,

Women: Veronika Sohail, Saima Shahzad, Saniha Ghafoor, Sonia Azmat, Rabbia Razzaq, Twinkle Sohail and Zara Zubair.

== Doping Bans ==
Three athletes: hurdlers Mehboob Ali (400m) and Mohammad Naeem (110m) and sprinter Samiullah (100m) tested positive for Anabolic Androgenic Steroids (AAS). They were banned for four years (till 5 December 2023) and stripped of their medals (Ali - gold, Naeem - gold and Samiullah - bronze). Since these athletes were also involved in relays, Pakistan was also stripped of bronze medals achieved in the 4 × 100 m and 4 × 400 m.

== Medal tally ==
As of 8 December 2019

Rank	Nation	Gold	Silver	Bronze	Total
1	Pakistan (PAK)	32	41	59	132
Totals (1 entries)		32	41	59	132

As of 13 July 2021 (after positive tests)

Rank	Nation	Gold	Silver	Bronze	Total
1	Pakistan (PAK)	30	41	57	128
Totals (1 entries)		30	41	57	128
