= Badminton at the 2019 South Asian Games – Men's team =

Badminton – Men's team at the 2019 South Asian Games
- Venue: Badminton Covered Hall
- Dates: 1 – 2 December 2019

Medalists
gold medal	India
silver medal	Sri Lanka
bronze medal	Pakistan
bronze medal	Nepal

The men's team badminton event at the 2019 South Asian Games was held from 1 to 2 December at the Badminton Covered Hall in Pokhara.

== Schedule ==
All times are Nepal Standard Time (UTC+05:45)

Date	Time	Event
Sunday, 1 December	10:00	Quarter-finals
Monday, 2 December	10:00	Semi-finals
Monday, 2 December	17:00	Gold medal match

== Bracket ==
Quarter-finals
Bangladesh
Pakistan	w/o
Nepal	3
Bhutan	0

Semi-finals
India	3
Pakistan	0
Nepal	1
Sri Lanka	3

Gold medal match
India	3
Sri Lanka	1

== Quarter-finals ==
=== Nepal vs Bhutan ===
Nepal
3
Badminton Covered Hall, Court 1
1 December 2019, 10:00

Bhutan
0

			1	2	3
1	(Nepal) (Bhutan)	Ratnajit Tamang; Anish Gurung	21; 6	21; 9
2	(Nepal) (Bhutan)	Dipesh Dhami; Nidup Dorji	21; 13	21; 14
3	(Nepal) (Bhutan)	Prince Dahal; Norbu Dradhul	21; 12	21; 5
4	(Nepal) (Bhutan)	Dipesh Dhami / Ratnajit Tamang; Karma Chendru / Anish Gurung				not played
5	(Nepal) (Bhutan)	Prince Dahal / Praful Maharjan; Nidup Dorji / Norbu Dradhul				not played

=== Pakistan vs Bangladesh ===
Pakistan
–
Badminton Covered Hall, Court 2
1 December 2019, 10:00

Bangladesh
Withdrew

		1	2	3
1	(Pakistan) (Bangladesh)
2	(Pakistan) (Bangladesh)
3	(Pakistan) (Bangladesh)
4	(Pakistan) (Bangladesh)
5	(Pakistan) (Bangladesh)

== Semi-finals ==
=== India vs Pakistan ===
India
3
Badminton Covered Hall, Court 1
2 December 2019, 10:00

Pakistan
0

			1	2	3
1	(India) (Pakistan)	Arun George / Sanyam Shukla; Muhammad Atique / Raja Muhammad Hasnain	21; 12	21; 12
2	(India) (Pakistan)	Siril Verma; Zahid Awais	21; 7	21; 7
3	(India) (Pakistan)	Krishna Prasad Garaga; Murad Ali	21; 19	21; 18
4	(India) (Pakistan)	Aryamann Tandon; Muhammad Muqeet Tahir				not played
5	(India) (Pakistan)	Pranav Chopra / Akshay Dewalkar; Murad Ali / Zahid Awais				not played

=== Sri Lanka vs Nepal ===
Sri Lanka
3
Badminton Covered Hall, Court 2
2 December 2019, 10:00

Nepal
1

			1	2	3
1	(Sri Lanka) (Nepal)	Sachin Dias / Buwaneka Goonethilleka; Dipesh Dhami / Ratnajit Tamang	21; 11	21; 15
2	(Sri Lanka) (Nepal)	Dinuka Karunaratne; Ratnajit Tamang	22; 20	21; 9
3	(Sri Lanka) (Nepal)	Ranthushka Karunathilaka; Prince Dahal	18; 21	21; 19	18; 21
4	(Sri Lanka) (Nepal)	Sachin Dias; Dipesh Dhami	22; 24	21; 18	21; 16
5	(Sri Lanka) (Nepal)	Hasitha Chanaka / Dinuka Karunaratne; Prince Dahal / Praful Maharjan				not played

== Gold medal match ==
=== India vs Sri Lanka ===
India
3
Badminton Covered Hall, Court 1
2 December 2019, 17:00

Sri Lanka
1

			1	2	3
1	(India) (Sri Lanka)	Srikanth Kidambi; Dinuka Karunaratne	17; 21	21; 15	21; 11
2	(India) (Sri Lanka)	Siril Verma; Sachin Dias	21; 17	11; 5		retired
3	(India) (Sri Lanka)	Arun George / Sanyam Shukla; Sachin Dias / Buwaneka Goonethilleka	18; 21	21; 14	11; 21
4	(India) (Sri Lanka)	Krishna Prasad Garaga / Dhruv Kapila; Hasitha Chanaka / Dinuka Karunaratne	21; 14	21; 18
5	(India) (Sri Lanka)	Aryamann Tandon; Madhuka Dulanjana				not played
