= Badminton at the 2017 Summer Universiade – Mixed team =

Mixed team at the 2017 Summer Universiade
- Venue: Taipei Gymnasium
- Location: Taipei, Taiwan
- Dates: 23–25 August 2017
- Competitors: 218 from 26 nations

Medalists
gold medal	Chinese Taipei (TPE)
silver medal	Japan (JPN)
bronze medal	Thailand (THA)
bronze medal	Malaysia (MAS)

The mixed team badminton event at the 2017 Summer Universiade was held from August 23 to 25 at the Taipei Gymnasium in Taipei, Taiwan.

== Group composition ==
Group A	Group B	Group C	Group D	Group E	Group F	Group G	Group H
South Korea Sri Lanka Uganda	Japan Poland Bhutan	Germany Canada Estonia Philippines	Malaysia Australia South Africa	Thailand Indonesia Singapore	India Hong Kong Slovenia Sweden	Russia United States Botswana	Chinese Taipei France Brazil

== Group stage ==
All times are Taiwan Standard Time (UTC+08:00).

=== Group A ===
Pos	Team	Pld	W	L	MW	ML	GW	GL	PW	PL	Pts	Qualification
1	South Korea	2	2	0	10	0	20	1	443	188	2	Quarterfinals
2	Sri Lanka	2	1	1	5	5	11	11	353	470	1	9th–16th places
3	Uganda	2	0	2	0	10	1	20	201	439	0	17th - 23rd places

Team 1	Score	Team 2
South Korea	5–0	Sri Lanka
South Korea	5–0	Uganda
Sri Lanka	5–0	Uganda

==== South Korea vs Sri Lanka ====
South Korea
5
Taipei Gymnasium, Court 5
23 August 2017 17:00

Sri Lanka
0

			1	2	3
1	(South Korea) (Sri Lanka)	Jeon Hyeok-jin; Pamudit Ambegoda	21; 5	21; 7
2	(South Korea) (Sri Lanka)	Lee Jang-mi; Promodika Hendahewa	21; 13	21; 9
3	(South Korea) (Sri Lanka)	Kim Jae-hwan / Seo Seung-jae; Chinthaka Manimel Wadu / Sithila Dananja Galba Liyange	21; 3	21; 9
4	(South Korea) (Sri Lanka)	Lee Seung-hui / Ji Jeong-bin; Kavidi Ishadika Sirimannage / Thilini Pramodika Hendahewa	18; 21	24; 22	23; 21
5	(South Korea) (Sri Lanka)	Seo Seung-jae / Ji Jeong-bin; Pamudit Ambegoda / Rathnasiri Kapuru Mud.	21; 7	21; 7

==== South Korea vs Uganda ====
South Korea
5
Taipei Gymnasium, Court 1
23 August 2017 09:00

Uganda
0

			1	2	3
1	(South Korea) (Uganda)	Kim Jae-hwan / Lee Seung-hui; Herbert Ebayo / Aisha Nakiyemba	21; 2	21; 4
2	(South Korea) (Uganda)	Woo Seung-hun; Daniel Mihigo Sebunnya	21; 4	21; 3
3	(South Korea) (Uganda)	Kim Joo-eun; Bridget Shamim Bangi	21; 11	21; 7
4	(South Korea) (Uganda)	Choi Hyuk-gyun / Park Kyung-hoon; Yakoub Musisi / Herbert Ebayo	21; 8	21; 3
5	(South Korea) (Uganda)	Yoon Tae-kyung / Park Min-jeong; Bridget Shamim Bangi / Aisha Nakiyemba	21; 14	21; 8

==== Sri Lanka vs Uganda ====
Sri Lanka
5
Taipei Gymnasium, Court 3
23 August 2017 13:00

Uganda
0

			1	2	3
1	(Sri Lanka) (Uganda)	Pamudit Ambegoda; Daniel Mihigo Sebunnya	21; 16	21; 13
2	(Sri Lanka) (Uganda)	Promodika Hendahewa; Bridget Shamim Bangi	21; 15	21; 4
3	(Sri Lanka) (Uganda)	Pramud Rachinth Weerasuriya / Sanura Charindu Hapuarachchi; Herbert Ebayo / Yakoub Musisi	19; 21	21; 18	21; 18
4	(Sri Lanka) (Uganda)	Rathnasiri Kapuru Mud. / Oshadie Kuruppu; Bridget Shamim Bangi / Aisha Nakiyemba	21; 9	21; 13
5	(Sri Lanka) (Uganda)	Pamudit Ambegoda / Kavidi Ishadika Sirimannage; Herbert Ebayo / Aisha Nakiyemba	21; 6	21; 4

=== Group B ===
Pos	Team	Pld	W	L	MW	ML	GW	GL	PW	PL	Pts	Qualification
1	Japan	2	2	0	10	0	20	0	420	150	2	Quarterfinals
2	Poland	2	1	1	5	5	10	10	331	267	1	9th–16th places
3	Bhutan	2	0	2	0	10	0	20	86	420	0	17th - 23rd places

Team 1	Score	Team 2
Japan	5–0	Poland
Japan	5–0	Bhutan
Poland	5–0	Bhutan

==== Japan vs Poland ====
Japan
5
Taipei Gymnasium, Court 1
23 August 2017 17:00

Poland
0

			1	2	3
1	(Japan) (Poland)	Kenya Mitsuhashi / Rena Miyaura; Przemysław Szydłowski / Magdalena Witek	21; 18	21; 9
2	(Japan) (Poland)	Kenta Nishimoto; Krzysztof Jakowczuk	21; 14	21; 16
3	(Japan) (Poland)	Shuhei Ozeki / Sho Kawabata; Przemysław Szydłowski / Mateusz Biernacki	21; 18	21; 5
4	(Japan) (Poland)	Natsumi Shimoda; Joanna Katarzyn Stanisz	21; 13	21; 4
5	(Japan) (Poland)	Miyuki Kato / Miki Kashihara; Magdalena Witek / Kornelia Agnies Marczak	21; 9	21; 15

==== Japan vs Bhutan ====
Japan
5
Taipei Gymnasium, Court 2
23 August 2017 09:00

Bhutan
0

			1	2	3
1	(Japan) (Bhutan)	Katsuki Tamate / Miyuki Kato; Dorji Khando / Sonam Yangchen	21; 2	21; 1
2	(Japan) (Bhutan)	Yu Igarashi; Nihal Rai	21; 1	21; 6
3	(Japan) (Bhutan)	Ayaho Sugino; Rinzin Wangmo	21; 2	21; 7
4	(Japan) (Bhutan)	Shuhei Ozeki / Sho Kawabata; Nihal Rai / Dorji Khando	21; 3	21; 3
5	(Japan) (Bhutan)	Rena Miyaura / Ririka Katsumata; Rinzin Wangmo / Sonam Yangchen	21; 3	21; 1

==== Poland vs Bhutan ====
Poland
5
Taipei Gymnasium, Court 4
23 August 2017 13:00

Bhutan
0

			1	2	3
1	(Poland) (Bhutan)	Przemysław Szydłowski / Magdalena Witek; Nihal Rai / Rinzin Wangmo	21; 9	21; 5
2	(Poland) (Bhutan)	Mateusz Swierczynski; Dorji Khando	21; 5	21; 7
3	(Poland) (Bhutan)	Joanna Katarzyn Stanisz; Sonam Yangchen	21; 2	21; 5
4	(Poland) (Bhutan)	Przemysław Szydłowski / Mateusz Biernacki; Dorji Biernacki / Rai Nihal	21; 4	21; 8
5	(Poland) (Bhutan)	Magdalena Witek / Kornelia Agnies Marczak; Rinzin Wangmo / Sonam Yangchen	21; 6	21; 6

=== Group C ===
Pos	Team	Pld	W	L	MW	ML	GW	GL	PW	PL	Pts	Qualification
1	Germany	3	3	0	13	2	27	5	654	446	3	Quarterfinals
2	Canada	3	2	1	11	4	24	10	669	517	2	9th–16th places
3	Estonia	3	1	2	5	10	11	22	505	603	1	17th - 23rd places
4	Philippines	3	0	3	1	14	3	28	376	638	0	24th–25th places

Team 1	Score	Team 2
Germany	3–2	Canada
Germany	5–0	Estonia
Canada	4–1	Estonia
Philippines	0–5	Germany
Philippines	0–5	Canada
Philippines	1–4	Estonia

==== Germany vs Canada ====
Germany
3
Taipei Gymnasium, Court 6
24 August 2017 09:00

Canada
2

			1	2	3
1	(Germany) (Canada)	Daniel Hess / Eva Janssens; Josephine Yuenl Wu / Ty Alexander Lindeman	17; 21	21; 23
2	(Germany) (Canada)	Kai Schäfer; Jason Anthony Ho-shue	13; 21	21; 15	17; 21
3	(Germany) (Canada)	Yvonne Li; Brittney Shanno Tam	21; 17	15; 21	21; 15
4	(Germany) (Canada)	Daniel Hess / Johannes Pistorius; Jason Anthony Ho-shue / Jonathan Bing Tsan Lai	25; 23	21; 13
5	(Germany) (Canada)	Eva Janssens / Linda Efler; Josephine Yuenl Wu / Michelle Tong Yee Mi	21; 11	21; 18

==== Germany vs Estonia ====
Germany
5
Taipei Gymnasium, Court 5
23 August 2017 13:00

Estonia
0

			1	2	3
1	(Germany) (Estonia)	Daniel Hess / Eva Janssens; Mihkel Laanes / Sigrid-Laura Moora	21; 9	21; 10
2	(Germany) (Estonia)	Kai Schäfer; Heiko Zoober	21; 8	21; 13
3	(Germany) (Estonia)	Daniel Hess / Johannes Pistorius; Mihkel Laanes / Mikk Järveoja	21; 8	21; 13
4	(Germany) (Estonia)	Yvonne Li; Kätlin Lattik	21; 4	21; 11
5	(Germany) (Estonia)	Eva Janssens / Linda Efler; Hannaliina Piho / Sigrid-Laura Moora	21; 15	21; 16

==== Canada vs Estonia ====
Canada
4
Taipei Gymnasium, Court 5
23 August 2017 09:00

Estonia
1

			1	2	3
1	(Canada) (Estonia)	Ty Alexander Lindeman / Josephine Wu Yuenl; Sander Sauk / Kätlin Lattik	21; 10	21; 16
2	(Canada) (Estonia)	Philippe Giguere; Mihkel Laanes	18; 21	21; 18	14; 21
3	(Canada) (Estonia)	Stéphanie Pakenham; Hannaliina Piho	19; 21	21; 12	21; 10
4	(Canada) (Estonia)	Jason Anthony Ho-shue / Janathan Bing Tsan Lai; Mihkel Laanes / Mikk Järveoja	21; 10	21; 16
5	(Canada) (Estonia)	Anne-Julie Beaulieu / Takeisha Wang; Hannaliina Piho / Sigrid-Laura Moora	21; 9	21; 16

==== Philippines vs Germany ====
Philippines
0
Taipei Gymnasium, Court 3
23 August 2017 09:00

Germany
5

			1	2	3
1	(Philippines) (Germany)	Ruben Haramel Jr. / Christine Garin; Johannes Pistorius / Linda Efler	9; 21	19; 21
2	(Philippines) (Germany)	Jc Clarito; Kai Schäfer	11; 21	9; 21
3	(Philippines) (Germany)	Loverly Dezelle Magallano; Yvonne Li	9; 21	5; 21
4	(Philippines) (Germany)	Jc Clarito / Jerome Pechera; Daniel Hess / Johannes Pistorius	12; 21	19; 21
5	(Philippines) (Germany)	Loverly Dezelle Magallano / Gielyn Erika Ochoa; Eva Janssens / Linda Efler	14; 21	13; 21

==== Philippines vs Canada ====
Philippines
0
Taipei Gymnasium, Court 6
23 August 2017 13:00

Canada
5

			1	2	3
1	(Philippines) (Canada)	Ruben Haramel Jr. / Gielyn Erika Ochoa; Ty Alexander Lindeman / Josephine Wu	11; 21	17; 21
2	(Philippines) (Canada)	Jc Clarito; Jason Anthony Ho-shue	7; 21	14; 21
3	(Philippines) (Canada)	Jerome Pechera / Daniele Adrian Rigonan; Austin James Bauer / Ty Alexander Lindeman	11; 21	7; 21
4	(Philippines) (Canada)	Loverly Dezelle Magallano; Brittney Shanno Tam	9; 21	9; 21
5	(Philippines) (Canada)	Gilly Chavez / Christine Garin; Josephine Wu / Michelle Tong	11; 21	7; 21

==== Philippines vs Estonia ====
Philippines
1
Taipei Gymnasium, Court 2
24 August 2017 09:00

Estonia
4

			1	2	3
1	(Philippines) (Estonia)	Jerome Pechera / Christine Garin; Mihkel Laanes / Sigrid-Laura Moora	10; 21	21; 17	19; 21
2	(Philippines) (Estonia)	Daniele Adrian Rigonan; Heiko Zoober	5; 21	8; 21
3	(Philippines) (Estonia)	Gilly Chavez; Hannaliina Piho	12; 21	5; 21
4	(Philippines) (Estonia)	Ruben haramel Jr. / Joshua Gacis; Mihkel Laanes / Mikk Jaerveoja	12; 21	19; 21
5	(Philippines) (Estonia)	Loverly Dezalle Magallano / Gielyn Erika Ochoa; Hannaliina Piho / Sigrid-Laura Moora	21; 19	21; 14

=== Group D ===
Pos	Team	Pld	W	L	MW	ML	GW	GL	PW	PL	Pts	Qualification
1	Malaysia	2	2	0	10	0	20	0	420	202	2	Quarterfinals
2	Australia	2	1	1	5	5	10	10	319	319	1	9th–16th places
3	South Africa	2	0	2	0	10	0	20	202	420	0	17th - 23rd places

Team 1	Score	Team 2
Malaysia	5–0	Australia
Malaysia	5–0	South Africa
Australia	5–0	South Africa

==== Malaysia vs Australia ====
Malaysia
5
Taipei Gymnasium, Court 7
23 August 2017 17:00

Australia
0

			1	2	3
1	(Malaysia) (Australia)	Muhammad Syawal Mohd Ismail / Nur Mohd Azriyn Ayub; Daniel Fan Fwu Haur / Eric Vuong	21; 9	21; 6
2	(Malaysia) (Australia)	Yang Li Lian; Tiffany Ho	21; 8	21; 15
3	(Malaysia) (Australia)	Satheishtharan Ramachandran; Athithan Selladurai	21; 7	21; 9
4	(Malaysia) (Australia)	Goh Yea Ching / Yang Li Lian; Claudia Denise Lam / Sirina Fan Jing-man	21; 11	21; 9
5	(Malaysia) (Australia)	Jagdish Singh Danoa Kuldip Singh / Lyddia Cheah Yi Yu; Eric Vuong / Jennifer Tam	21; 17	21; 18

==== Malaysia vs South Africa ====
Malaysia
5
Taipei Gymnasium, Court 5
23 August 2017 09:00

South Africa
0

			1	2	3
1	(Malaysia) (South Africa)	Jagdish Singh Danoa Kuldip Singh / Goh Yea Ching; Anoop Nair / Lee Ann Theleen De Wet	21; 4	21; 7
2	(Malaysia) (South Africa)	Vincent Cheng Wei Phuah; Bongani Von Bodenstein	21; 10	21; 9
3	(Malaysia) (South Africa)	Desiree Siow Hao Sha; Janke Van Der Vyver	21; 9	21; 8
4	(Malaysia) (South Africa)	Nur Mohd Azriyn Ayub / Muhammad Syawal Mohd Ismail; Anoop Nair / Bongani Von Bodenstein	21; 10	21; 10
5	(Malaysia) (South Africa)	Yang Li Lian / Lyddia Cheah Yi Yu; Lee Ann Theleen De Wet / Janke Van Der Vyver	21; 15	21; 11

==== Australia vs South Africa ====
Australia
5
Taipei Gymnasium, Court 7
23 August 2017 13:00

South Africa
0

			1	2	3
1	(Australia) (South Africa)	Eric Vuong / Tiffany Ho; Annop Nair / Lee Ann Theleen De Wet	21; 10	21; 12
2	(Australia) (South Africa)	Daniel Fan Fwu Haur; Bongani Von Bodenstein	21; 7	21; 8
3	(Australia) (South Africa)	Jennifer Tam; Janke Van Der Vyver	21; 11	21; 11
4	(Australia) (South Africa)	Athithan Selladurai / Eric Vuong; Anoop Nair / Bongani Von Bodenstein	21; 11	21; 16
5	(Australia) (South Africa)	Jennifer Tam / Tiffany Ho; Lee Ann Theleen De Wet / Janke Van Der Vyver	21; 7	21; 16

=== Group E ===
Pos	Team	Pld	W	L	MW	ML	GW	GL	PW	PL	Pts	Qualification
1	Thailand	2	2	0	9	1	19	5	488	387	2	Quarterfinals
2	Indonesia	2	1	1	5	5	13	12	475	441	1	9th–16th places
3	Singapore	2	0	2	1	9	4	19	330	465	0	17th - 23rd places

Team 1	Score	Team 2
Thailand	4–1	Indonesia
Thailand	5–0	Singapore
Indonesia	4–1	Singapore

==== Thailand vs Indonesia ====
Thailand
4
Taipei Gymnasium, Court 8
23 August 2017 17:00

Indonesia
1

			1	2	3
1	(Thailand) (Indonesia)	Kittsak Namdash / Tinn Isriyanet; Althof Baariq / Reinard Dhanriano	22; 20	21; 12
2	(Thailand) (Indonesia)	Nuntakarn Aimsaard; Marsa Indah Salsabila	25; 23	21; 12
3	(Thailand) (Indonesia)	Pannawit Thongnuam; Panji Akbar Sudrajat	19; 21	21; 11	24; 22
4	(Thailand) (Indonesia)	Chayanit Chaladchalam / Phataimas Muenwong; Aris Budiharti / Della Augustia Surya	19; 21	21; 11	24; 22
5	(Thailand) (Indonesia)	Prinyawat Thongnuam / Natcha Saengchote; Agripina Prima Rahmanto / Masita Mahmudin	13; 21	22; 20	18; 21

==== Thailand vs Singapore ====
Thailand
5
Taipei Gymnasium, Court 6
23 August 2017 09:00

Singapore
0

			1	2	3
1	(Thailand) (Singapore)	Nittisak Namdash / Tinn Isriyanet; Lucas Wee Zi Xuan / Segar Vighnesh	21; 12	21; 8
2	(Thailand) (Singapore)	Nuntakarn Aimsaard; Chong Fui Jin	21; 10	21; 9
3	(Thailand) (Singapore)	Pannawit Thongnuam; Koh Jia Yi	16; 21	21; 15	24; 22
4	(Thailand) (Singapore)	Chanyanit Chakadchalam / Phataimas Muenwong; Lee Shu Zhen / Lim Si Xian	21; 12	21; 14
5	(Thailand) (Singapore)	Prinyawat Thongnuam / Natcha Saengchote; Koh Jia Yi / Fiona Seah Jin Feng	21; 10	21; 15

==== Indonesia vs Singapore ====
Indonesia
4
Taipei Gymnasium, Court 8
23 August 2017 13:00

Singapore
1

			1	2	3
1	(Indonesia) (Singapore)	Marsa Indiah Salsabila; Chnog Fui Jin	21; 15	21; 15
2	(Indonesia) (Singapore)	Panji Akbar Sudrajat; Ngo Yi Chye	21; 17	13; 21	16; 21
3	(Indonesia) (Singapore)	Aris Budiharti / Della Augustia Surya; Fiona Seah Jin Feng / Chong Fui Jin	21; 13	21; 14
4	(Indonesia) (Singapore)	Althof Baariq / Reinard Dhanriano; Lucas Wee Zi Xuan / Koh Jia Yi	21; 14	18; 21	21; 16
5	(Indonesia) (Singapore)	Agripina Prima Rahmanto / Masita Mahmudin; Ngo Yi Chye / Fiona Seah Jin Feng	21; 5	21; 10

=== Group F ===
Pos	Team	Pld	W	L	MW	ML	GW	GL	PW	PL	Pts	Qualification
1	Hong Kong	3	3	0	13	2	27	6	647	428	3	Quarterfinals
2	India	3	2	1	10	5	22	11	588	521	2	9th–16th places
3	Slovenia	3	1	2	4	11	9	24	497	648	1	17th - 23rd places
3	Sweden	3	0	3	3	12	7	24	456	591	0	24th–25th places

Team 1	Score	Team 2
India	1–4	Hong Kong
India	5–0	Slovenia
Hong Kong	4–1	Slovenia
Sweden	1–4	India
Sweden	0–5	Hong Kong
Sweden	2–3	Slovenia

==== India vs Hong Kong ====
India
1
Taipei Gymnasium, Court 3
24 August 2017 09:00

Hong Kong
4

			1	2	3
1	(India) (Hong Kong)	Gopi Raju Garikapati / Harika Veludurthi; Chang Tak Ching / Yuen Sin Ying	4; 21	14; 21
2	(India) (Hong Kong)	Aman Kumar; Yeung Ming Nok	21; 18	9; 21	12; 21
3	(India) (Hong Kong)	Riya Mokerjee; Tang Ho Lam	21; 11	21; 16
4	(India) (Hong Kong)	Gopi Raju Garikapati / Kawaldeep Singh; Yueng Ming Nok / Chang Tak Ching	11; 21	16; 21
5	(India) (Hong Kong)	Revati Ajay Devasthale / Vaishnavi Vikas Bhale; Yuen Sin Ying / Cheryl Chung Zin Yee	21; 11	8; 21	10; 21

==== India vs Slovenia ====
India
5
Taipei Gymnasium, Court 6
23 August 2017 17:00

Slovenia
0

			1	2	3
1	(India) (Slovenia)	Gopi Raju Garikapati / Harika Veludurthi; Mitja Šemrov / Jerca Bajuk	21; 13	21; 16
2	(India) (Slovenia)	Aman Kumar; Primoz Flis	21; 16	21; 11
3	(India) (Slovenia)	Riya Mokerjee; Kaja Stankovic	21; 13	21; 18
4	(India) (Slovenia)	Gopi Raju Garikapati / Kawaldeep Singh; Matevž Bajuk / Urban Turk	13; 21	21; 19	21; 14
5	(India) (Slovenia)	Harika Veludurthi / Riya Bajuk; Jerca Bajuk / Kaja Stankovic	21; 11	21; 19

==== Hong Kong vs Slovenia ====
Hong Kong
4
Taipei Gymnasium, Court 8
23 August 2017 09:00

Slovenia
1

			1	2	3
1	(Hong Kong) (Slovenia)	Chang Tak Ching / Yuen Sin Ying; Urban Turk / Jerca Bajuk	21; 13	21; 16
2	(Hong Kong) (Slovenia)	Tang Hoi Kit; Primoz Flis	21; 7	21; 10
3	(Hong Kong) (Slovenia)	Tang Ho Lam; Kaja Stankovic	9; 21	21; 11	14; 21
4	(Hong Kong) (Slovenia)	Yeung Ming Nok / Chang Tak Ching; Matevž Bajuk / Mitja Šemrov	21; 12	21; 12
5	(Hong Kong) (Slovenia)	Yuen Sin Ying / Cheryl Chung Zin Yee; Jerca Bajuk / Kaja Stankovic	21; 3	21; 17

==== Sweden vs India ====
Sweden
1
Taipei Gymnasium, Court 7
23 August 2017 09:00

India
4

			1	2	3
1	(Sweden) (India)	Karl Patrik Lundqvist / Isabella Berfin Aslan; Gopi Raju Garikapati / Marika Veludurthi	12; 21	16; 21
2	(Sweden) (India)	Simon Bergström; Kartik Jindal	9; 21	4; 21
3	(Sweden) (India)	Amanda Lina Vik Wallin; Riya Mokerjee	4; 21	6; 21
4	(Sweden) (India)	Simon Bergström / Karl Patrik Lundqvist; Gopi Raju Garikapati / Kawaldeep Singh	16; 21	17; 21
5	(Sweden) (India)	Amanda Lina Vik Wallin / Louise Mercy Ke Eriksson; Harika Veludurthi / Kanika Kanwal	21; 11	21; 18

==== Sweden vs Hong Kong ====
Sweden
0
Taipei Gymnasium, Court 2
23 August 2017 17:00

Hong Kong
5

			1	2	3
1	(Sweden) (Hong Kong)	Karl Patrik Lunqvist / Amanda Lina Vik Wallin; Chang Tak Ching / Yuen Sin Ying	20; 22	11; 21
2	(Sweden) (Hong Kong)	Simon Erik Bergström; Tang Hoi Kit	5; 21	12; 21
3	(Sweden) (Hong Kong)	Isabella Berfin Aslan; Tang Ho Lam	13; 21	18; 21
4	(Sweden) (Hong Kong)	Simon Erik Bergström / Karl Patrik Lunqvist; Yueng Ming Nok / Chang Tak Ching	9; 21	10; 21
5	(Sweden) (Hong Kong)	Amanda Lina Vik Wallin / Louise Mercy Ke Eriksson; Yuen Sin Ying / Cheryl Chung Zin Yee	10; 21	9; 21

==== Sweden vs Slovenia ====
Sweden
2
Taipei Gymnasium, Court 4
24 August 2017 09:00

Slovenia
3

			1	2	3
1	(Sweden) (Slovenia)	Karl Patrik Lundqvist / Louise Mercy Ke Eriksson; Jerca Bajuk / Mitja Šemrov	21; 10	21; 7
2	(Sweden) (Slovenia)	Simon Erik Bergström; Primoz Flis	22; 24	21; 19	20; 22
3	(Sweden) (Slovenia)	Isabella Berfin Aslan; Kaja Stankovic	16; 21	16; 21
4	(Sweden) (Slovenia)	Simon Erik Bergström / Karl Patrik Lundqvist; Matevž Bajuk / Urban Turk	14; 21	20; 22
5	(Sweden) (Slovenia)	Amanda Lina Vik Wallin / Louise Mercy Ke Eriksson; Jerca Bajuk / Kaja Stankovic	21; 7	21; 9

=== Group G ===
Pos	Team	Pld	W	L	MW	ML	GW	GL	PW	PL	Pts	Qualification
1	Russia	2	2	0	10	0	20	2	235	180	2	Quarterfinals
2	United States	2	1	1	5	5	12	10	180	235	1	9th–16th places
3	Botswana	2	0	2	0	10	0	0	0	0	0	RET

Team 1	Score	Team 2
Russia	5–0	United States
Russia	5–0	Botswana
United States	5–0	Botswana

==== Russia vs United States ====
Russia
5
Taipei Gymnasium, Court 5
24 August 2017 09:00

United States
0

			1	2	3
1	(Russia) (United States)	Rodion Alimov / Alina Davletova; Vinson Chiu / Victoria Chen	21; 18	21; 6
2	(Russia) (United States)	Andrey Parakhodin; Justin Ma	21; 15	21; 18
3	(Russia) (United States)	Rodion Kargaev / Vasily Kuznetsov; Darren Yang Chungda / Vinson Chiu	14; 21	21; 15	21; 14
4	(Russia) (United States)	Elena Komendrovskaia; Maya Chen	21; 11	21; 6
5	(Russia) (United States)	Ekaterina Bolotova / Alina Davletova; Annie Xu Xinfei / Xu Kerry Yifei	21; 17	11; 21	21; 18

==== Russia vs Botswana ====
Russia
5
Taipei Gymnasium, Court 2
23 August 2017 13:00

Botswana
RET

		1	2	3
1	(Russia) (Botswana)
2	(Russia) (Botswana)
3	(Russia) (Botswana)
4	(Russia) (Botswana)
5	(Russia) (Botswana)

==== United States vs Botswana ====
United States
5
Taipei Gymnasium, Court 3
23 August 2017 17:00

Botswana
RET

		1	2	3
1	(United States) (Botswana)
2	(United States) (Botswana)
3	(United States) (Botswana)
4	(United States) (Botswana)
5	(United States) (Botswana)

RET: Retired.

=== Group H ===
Pos	Team	Pld	W	L	MW	ML	GW	GL	PW	PL	Pts	Qualification
1	Chinese Taipei	2	2	0	10	0	20	1	438	232	2	Quarterfinals
2	France	2	1	1	5	5	11	11	376	381	1	9th–16th places
3	Brazil	2	0	2	0	10	1	20	237	438	0	17th - 23rd places

Team 1	Score	Team 2
Chinese Taipei	5–0	France
Chinese Taipei	5–0	Brazil
France	5–0	Brazil

==== Chinese Taipei vs France ====
Chinese Taipei
5
Taipei Gymnasium, Court 1
24 August 2017 09:00

France
0

			1	2	3
1	(Chinese Taipei) (France)	Yang Po-hsuan / Wen Hao-yun; Vimala Hériau / Thomas Baures	21; 14	21; 14
2	(Chinese Taipei) (France)	Wang Tzu-wei; Lucas Claerbout	18; 21	21; 13	21; 19
3	(Chinese Taipei) (France)	Lee Jhe-huei / Lee Yang; Thomas Baures / Toma Junior Popov	21; 9	21; 13
4	(Chinese Taipei) (France)	Chiang Mei-hui; Yaëlle Hoyaux	21; 18	21; 10
5	(Chinese Taipei) (France)	Lee Chia-hsin / Wu Ti-jung; Verlaine Faulmann / Vimala Hériau	21; 11	21; 6

==== Chinese Taipei vs Brazil ====
Chinese Taipei
5
Taipei Gymnasium, Court 1
23 August 2017 13:00

Brazil
0

			1	2	3
1	(Chinese Taipei) (Brazil)	Wang Chi-lin / Lee Chia-hsin; Luiz dos Santos Junior / Gabriele Cavalcante Pereira	21; 13	21; 10
2	(Chinese Taipei) (Brazil)	Hsu Jen-hao; Alisson de Souza Vasconcellos	21; 4	21; 6
3	(Chinese Taipei) (Brazil)	Tai Tzu-ying; Palo Eduarda Rodrigues D	21; 6	21; 6
4	(Chinese Taipei) (Brazil)	Lee Jhe-huei / Lee Yang; Alisson de Souza Vasconcellos / Luiz dos Santos Junior	21; 12	21; 9
5	(Chinese Taipei) (Brazil)	Hsu Ya-ching / Wu Ti-jung; Gabriele Cavalcante Pereira / Palo Eduarda Rodrigues D	21; 9	21; 9

==== France vs Brazil ====
France
5
Taipei Gymnasium, Court 4
23 August 2017 17:00

Brazil
0

			1	2	3
1	(France) (Brazil)	Toma Junior Popov / Vimala Hériau; Luiz dos Santos Junior / Gabriele Cavalcante Pereira	21; 13	18; 21	21; 14
2	(France) (Brazil)	Lucas Claerbout; Alisson de Souza Vasconcellos	21; 14	21; 17
3	(France) (Brazil)	Yaëlle Hoyaux; Palo Eduarda Rodrigues D	21; 12	21; 12
4	(France) (Brazil)	Mathieu Gangloff / Thomas Baures; Alisson de Souza Vasconcellos / Luiz dos Santos Junior	21; 9	21; 12
5	(France) (Brazil)	Marie Batomene / Verlaine Faulmann; Gabriele Cavalcante Pereira / Palo Eduarda Rodrigues D	21; 12	21; 17

== Ranking Stage ==
=== Top 8 ===
Quarterfinals
South Korea	2
Japan	3
Germany	2
Malaysia	3
Thailand	3
Hong Kong	1
Russia	0
Chinese Taipei	3

Semifinals
Japan	3
Malaysia	2
Thailand	0
Chinese Taipei	3

Final
Japan	0
Chinese Taipei	3

==== Quarterfinals ====
South Korea
2
Taipei Gymnasium, Court 2
24 August 2017 18:00

Japan
3

			1	2	3
1	(South Korea) (Japan)	Kim Jae-hwan / Seo Seung-jae; Shuhei Ozeki / Sho Kawabata	21; 18	21; 13
2	(South Korea) (Japan)	Lee Jang-mi; Natsumi Shimoda	21; 19	21; 14
3	(South Korea) (Japan)	Jeon Hyeok-jin; Kenta Nishimoto	16; 21	14; 21
4	(South Korea) (Japan)	Yoon Tae-kyung / Ji Jeong-bin; Miyuki Kato / Miki Kashihara	14; 21	14; 21
5	(South Korea) (Japan)	Seo Seung-jae / Lee Seung-hui; Kenya Mitsuhashi / Rena Miyaura	21; 16	14; 21	17; 21

Germany
2
Taipei Gymnasium, Court 4
24 August 2017 18:00

Malaysia
3

			1	2	3
1	(Germany) (Malaysia)	Johannes Pistorius / Linda Efler; Jagdish Singh Danoa Kuldip Singh / Goh Yea Ching	21; 14	18; 21	18; 21
2	(Germany) (Malaysia)	Kai Schäfer; Satheishtharan Ramachandran	21; 17	21; 14
3	(Germany) (Malaysia)	Daniel Hess / Johannes Pistorius; Muhammad Syawal Mohd Ismail / Nur Mohd Azriyn Ayub	21; 19	6; 21	9; 21
4	(Germany) (Malaysia)	Yvonne Li; Lyddia Cheah Yi Yu	21; 19	11; 21	21; 18
5	(Germany) (Malaysia)	Eva Janssens / Linda Efler; Goh Yea Ching / Yang Li Lian	19; 21	22; 20	17; 21

Thailand
3
Taipei Gymnasium, Court 3
24 August 2017 18:00

Hong Kong
1

			1	2	3
1	(Thailand) (Hong Kong)	Prinyawat Thongnuam / Natcha Saengchote; Chang Tak Ching / Yuen Sin Ying	13; 21	13; 21
2	(Thailand) (Hong Kong)	Pannawit Thongnuam; Tang Hoi Kit	21; 13	21; 13
3	(Thailand) (Hong Kong)	Kittisak Namdash / Tinn Isriyanet; Yeung Ming Nok / Chang Tak Ching	21; 19	13; 21	21; 17
4	(Thailand) (Hong Kong)	Nuntakarn Aimsaard; Tang Ho Lam	21; 15	21; 8
5	(Thailand) (Hong Kong)	Chayanite Chaladchalam / Phataimas Muenwong; Yuen Sin Ying / Cheryl Chung Zin Yee

Russia
0
Taipei Gymnasium, Court 1
24 August 2017 18:00

Chinese Taipei
3

			1	2	3
1	(Russia) (Chinese Taipei)	Rodion Alimov / Alina Davletova; Wang Chi-lin / Lee Chia-hsin	11; 21	13; 21
2	(Russia) (Chinese Taipei)	Andrei Parakhodin; Hsu Jen-hao	9; 21	9; 21
3	(Russia) (Chinese Taipei)	Rodion Kargaev / Vasily Kuznetsov; Lee Jhe-huei / Lee Yang	9; 21	10; 21
4	(Russia) (Chinese Taipei)	Elena Komendrovskaia; Tai Tzu-ying				not played
5	(Russia) (Chinese Taipei)	Ekaterina Bolotova / Alina Davletova; Hsu Ya-ching / Wu Ti-jung				not played

==== Semifinals ====
Japan
3
Taipei Gymnasium, Court 3
25 August 2017 09:00

Malaysia
2

			1	2	3
1	(Japan) (Malaysia)	Kenya Mitsuhashi / Rena Miyaura; Muhammad Syawal Mohd Ismail / Yang Li Lian	21; 19	21; 15
2	(Japan) (Malaysia)	Yu Igarashi; Vicent Phuah Cheng Wei	22; 20	21; 8
3	(Japan) (Malaysia)	Shuhei Ozeki / Sho Kawabata; Nur Mohd Azriyn Ayub / Jagdish Singh Danoa Kuldip Singh	11; 21	21; 12	14; 21
4	(Japan) (Malaysia)	Ayaho Sugino; Lyddia Cheah Yi Yu	21; 9	19; 21	14; 21
5	(Japan) (Malaysia)	Miyuki Kato / Miki Kashihara; Goh Yea Ching / Yang Li Lian	17; 21	21; 14	21; 14

Thailand
0
Taipei Gymnasium, Court 1
25 August 2017 09:00

Chinese Taipei
3

			1	2	3
1	(Thailand) (Chinese Taipei)	Kittisak Namdash / Tinn Isriyanet; Lee Jhe-huei / Lee Yang	6; 21	13; 21
2	(Thailand) (Chinese Taipei)	Nuntakarn Aimsaard; Tai Tzu-ying	3; 21	15; 21
3	(Thailand) (Chinese Taipei)	Pannawit Thongnuam; Hsu Jen-hao	17; 21	16; 21
4	(Thailand) (Chinese Taipei)	Chayanit Chaladchalam / Phataimas Muenwong; Wu Ti-jung / Hsu Ya-ching				not played
5	(Thailand) (Chinese Taipei)	Prinyawat Thongnuam / Natcha Saengchote; Wang Chi-lin / Lee Chia-hsin				not played

==== Final ====
Japan
0
Taipei Gymnasium, Court 1
25 August 2017

Chinese Taipei
3

			1	2	3
1	(Japan) (Chinese Taipei)	Katsuki Tamate / Kenya Mitsuhashi; Lee Yang / Lee Jhe-huei	5; 21	15; 21
2	(Japan) (Chinese Taipei)	Natsumi Shimoda; Tai Tzu-ying	8; 21	13; 21
3	(Japan) (Chinese Taipei)	Kenta Nishimoto; Wang Tzu-wei	21; 19	17; 21	10; 21
4	(Japan) (Chinese Taipei)	Miyuki Kato / Miki Kashihara; Wu Ti-jung / Hsu Ya-ching				not played
5	(Japan) (Chinese Taipei)	Kenya Mitsuhashi / Rena Miyaura; Wang Chi-lin / Lee Chia-hsin				not played

=== 9th–16th places ===
9th–16th places
Sri Lanka	1
Poland	3
Canada	2
Australia	3
Indonesia	3
India	2
United States	3
France	2

9th–12th places
Poland	3
Australia	0
Indonesia	3
United States	0

9th place
Poland	0
Indonesia	3

==== 9th–16th places ====
Sri Lanka
1
Taipei Gymnasium, Court
August 2017

Poland
3

			1	2	3
1	(Sri Lanka) (Poland)	Pamudit Ambegoda / Kavidi Sirimannage; Przemysław Szydłowski / Magdalena Witek	16; 21	9; 21
2	(Sri Lanka) (Poland)	Sithila Galbada Liyanage; Mateusz Swierczynski	11; 21	14; 21
3	(Sri Lanka) (Poland)	Thilini Pramodika Hendahewa; Joanna Katarzyn Stanisz	21; 15	21; 10
4	(Sri Lanka) (Poland)	Pramod Weerasuriya / Chinthaka Manimel Wadu; Krzysztof Jakowczuk / Przemysław Szydłowski	10; 21	10; 21
5	(Sri Lanka) (Poland)	Kavidi Sirimannage / Thilini Pramodika Hendahewa; Magdalena Witek / Agnieszka Marczak				not played

Canada
2
Taipei Gymnasium, Court 2
24 August 2017 14:00

Australia
3

			1	2	3
1	(Canada) (Australia)	Jonathan Bing Tsan / Takeisha Wang; Eric Vuong / Jennifer Tam	20; 22	22; 20	21; 18
2	(Canada) (Australia)	Philippe Giguere; Daniel Fan Fwu Haur	19; 21	10; 21
3	(Canada) (Australia)	Brittney Tam; Tiffany Ho	21; 7	21; 8
4	(Canada) (Australia)	Austin James Bauer / Jonathan Bing Tsan Lai; Athithan Selladurai / Eric Vuong	21; 16	18; 21	18; 21
5	(Canada) (Australia)	Anne-Julie Beaulieu / Stephanie Pakenham; Jennifer Tam / Tiffany Ho	21; 12	18; 21	14; 21

Indonesia
3
Taipei Gymnasium, Court 1
24 August 2017 14:00

India
2

			1	2	3
1	(Indonesia) (India)	Agripina Prima Rahmanto / Masita Mahmudin; Hardik Makkar / Kanika Kanwal	21; 9	21; 12
2	(Indonesia) (India)	Panji Akbar Sudrajat; Kartik Jindal	21; 12	20; 22	21; 12
3	(Indonesia) (India)	Marsa Indah Salsabila; Revati Ajay Devasthale	9; 21	17; 21
4	(Indonesia) (India)	Althof Baariq / Reinard Dhanriano; Hardik Makkar / Kartik Jindal	17; 21	21; 10	22; 24
5	(Indonesia) (India)	Aris Budiharti / Della Augustia Surya; Harika Veludurthi / Kanika Kanwal	21; 11	22; 20

United States
3
Taipei Gymnasium, Court 4
24 August 2017 14:00

France
2

			1	2	3
1	(United States) (France)	William Cheung Wai Hon / Annie Xu Xinfei; Thomas Baures / Vimala Hériau	12; 21	17; 21
2	(United States) (France)	Joseph Michael Pitman; Toma Junior Popov	11; 21	14; 21
3	(United States) (France)	Kerry Xu Yifei; Yaëlle Hoyaux	13; 21	21; 18	21; 14
4	(United States) (France)	Darren Yang Chungda / Vinson Chiu; Lucas Claerbout / Mathieu Gangloff	21; 17	21; 23	21; 10
5	(United States) (France)	Annie Xu Xinfei / Kerry Xu Yifei; Verlaine Faulmann / Vimala Hériau	21; 17	21; 9

==== 9th–12th places ====
Poland
3
Taipei Gymnasium, Court 5
24 August 2017 18:00

Australia
0

			1	2	3
1	(Poland) (Australia)	Przemysław Szydłowski / Magdalena Witek; Eric Vuong / Tiffany Ho	21; 18	21; 7
2	(Poland) (Australia)	Krzysztof Jakowczuk; Daniel Fan Fwu Haur	21; 19	21; 12
3	(Poland) (Australia)	Przemysław Szydłowski / Mateusz Swierczynski; Athithan Selladurai / Eric Vuong	21; 11	21; 16
4	(Poland) (Australia)	Joanna Katarzyn Stanisz; Jennifer Tam				not played
5	(Poland) (Australia)	Magdalena Witek / Kornella Agnies Marczak; Claudia Lam / Sirian Fan Jing-man				not played

Indonesia
3
Taipei Gymnasium, Court 6
24 August 2017 18:00

United States
0

			1	2	3
1	(Indonesia) (United States)	Althof Baariq / Reinard Dhanriano; Joseph Pitman / Vinson Chiu	21; 9	21; 16
2	(Indonesia) (United States)	Marsa Indah Salsabila; Maya Chen	22; 20	21; 13
3	(Indonesia) (United States)	Panji Akbar Sudrajat; Darren Yang	21; 14	21; 6
4	(Indonesia) (United States)	Aris Budiharti / Della Augustia Surya; Annie Xu Xinfei / Kerry Xu Yifei				not played
5	(Indonesia) (United States)	Agripina Prima Rahmanto / Masita Mahmudin; Justin Ma / Victoria Chen				not played

==== 9th place ====
Poland
0
Taipei Gymnasium, Court 7
25 August 2017 09:00

Indonesia
3

			1	2	3
1	(Poland) (Indonesia)	Magdalena Witek / Przemysław Szydłowski; Agripina Prima Rahmanto / Masita Mahmudin	13; 21	17; 21
2	(Poland) (Indonesia)	Krzysztof Jakowczuk; Panji Akbar Sudrajat	17; 21	14; 21
3	(Poland) (Indonesia)	Przemysław Szydłowski / Mateusz Swierczynski; Althof Baariq / Reinard Dhanriano	14; 21	17; 21
4	(Poland) (Indonesia)	Joanna Katarzyn Stanisz; Marsa Indah Salsabila				not played
5	(Poland) (Indonesia)	Magdalena Witek / Kornelia Agnies Marczak; Aris Budiharti / Della Augustia Surya				not played

=== 17th - 23rd places ===
17th - 23rd places
Uganda
Bhutan	w/o
Estonia	3
South Africa	0
Singapore	1
Slovenia	3
Bye
Brazil

17th–20th places
Uganda	1
Estonia	3
Slovenia	3
Brazil	1

17th place
Estonia	2
Slovenia	3

==== 17th - 23rd places ====
Uganda
5
Taipei Gymnasium, Court 5
24 August 2017 14:00

Bhutan
w/o

			1	2	3
1	(Uganda) (Bhutan)	Herbert Ebayo / Aisha Nakiyemba; Nihal Rai / Rinzin Wangmo				w/o
2	(Uganda) (Bhutan)	Daniel Mihigo Sebunnya; Dorji Khando
3	(Uganda) (Bhutan)	Bridget Shamim Bangi; Rinzin Wangmo
4	(Uganda) (Bhutan)	Yakoub Musisi / Herbert Ebayo; Dorji Khando / Nihal Rai
5	(Uganda) (Bhutan)	Bridget Shamim Bangi / Aisha Nakiyemba; Rinzin Wangmo / Sonam Yangchen

Estonia
3
Taipei Gymnasium, Court 6
24 August 2017 14:00

South Africa
0

			1	2	3
1	(Estonia) (South Africa)	Mihkel Laanes / Hannaliina Piho; Anoop Nair / Lee Ann Theleen De Wet	21; 15	21; 12
2	(Estonia) (South Africa)	Heiko Zoober; Bongani Von Bodenstein	21; 14	21; 19
3	(Estonia) (South Africa)	Hannaliina Piho; Janke Van Der Vyver	21; 11	21; 15
4	(Estonia) (South Africa)	Mikk Järveoja / Sander Sauk; Anoop Nair / Bongani Von Bodenstein				not played
5	(Estonia) (South Africa)	Kätlin Lattik / Sigrid-Laura Moora; Lee Ann Theleen De Wet / Janke Van Der Vyver				not played

Singapore
1
Taipei Gymnasium, Court 7
24 August 2017 14:00

Slovenia
3

			1	2	3
1	(Singapore) (Slovenia)	Koh Jia Yi / Fiona Seah Jin Feng; Matevž Bajuk / Jerca Bajuk	21; 16	14; 21	16; 21
2	(Singapore) (Slovenia)	Poon Jey-Ren; Primoz Flis	21; 17	21; 16
3	(Singapore) (Slovenia)	Chong Fui Jin; Kaja Stankovic	19; 21	13; 21
4	(Singapore) (Slovenia)	Segar Vighnesh / Ngo Yi Chye; Mitja Šemrov / Urban Turk	21; 16	21; 23	16; 21
5	(Singapore) (Slovenia)	Kelly Tan Jia Li / Lee Shu Zhen; Jerca Bajuk / Kaja Stankovic				not played

==== 17th–20th places ====
Uganda
1
Taipei Gymnasium, Court 7
24 August 2017 18:00

Estonia
3

			1	2	3
1	(Uganda) (Estonia)	Herbert Ebayo / Aisha Nakiyemba; Mihkel Laanes / Kätlin Lattik	7; 21	21; 19	19; 21
2	(Uganda) (Estonia)	Daniel Mihigo Sebunnya; Mikk Järveoja	11; 21	16; 21
3	(Uganda) (Estonia)	Bridget Shamim Bangi; Hannaliina Piho	16; 21	21; 13	21; 6
4	(Uganda) (Estonia)	Yakoub Musisi / Herbert Ebayo; Heiko Zoober / Sander Sauk	11; 21	14; 21
5	(Uganda) (Estonia)	Bridget Shamim Bangi / Aisha Nakiyemba; Kätlin Lattik / Sigrid-Laura Moora				not played

Slovenia
3
Taipei Gymnasium, Court 8
24 August 2017 18:00

Brazil
1

			1	2	3
1	(Slovenia) (Brazil)	Jerca Bajuk / Matevž Bajuk; Luiz dos Santos Junior / Gabriele Cavalcante Pereira	21; 17	11; 21	24; 22
2	(Slovenia) (Brazil)	Primož Flis; Alisson Souza Vasconcelos	17; 21	13; 21
3	(Slovenia) (Brazil)	Kaja Stankovic; Paloma Eduarda Rodrigues	21; 16	18; 21	21; 6
4	(Slovenia) (Brazil)	Mitja Šemrov / Urban Turk; Alisson Souza Vasconcelos / Luiz dos Santos Junior	21; 18	21; 19
5	(Slovenia) (Brazil)	Jerca Bajuk / Kaja Stankovic; Gabriele Cavalcante Pereira / Paloma Eduarda Rodrigues				not played

==== 17th place ====
Estonia
2
Taipei Gymnasium, Court 6
25 August 2017 09:00

Slovenia
3

			1	2	3
1	(Estonia) (Slovenia)	Mohkel Laanes / Kätlin Lattik; Urban Turk / Jerca Bajuk	22; 20	21; 12
2	(Estonia) (Slovenia)	Mikk Järveoja; Matevz Bajuk	17; 21	16; 21
3	(Estonia) (Slovenia)	Kätlin Lattik; Kaja Stankovic	12; 21	9; 21
4	(Estonia) (Slovenia)	Heiko Zoober / Sander Sauk; Mitja Šemrov / Urban Turk	21; 18	12; 21	22; 20
5	(Estonia) (Slovenia)	Hannaliina Piho / Sigrid-Laura Moora; Jerca Bajuk / Kaja Stankovic	17; 21	8; 21

=== 24th place ===
24th place
Philippines	1
Sweden	3

Philippines
1
Taipei Gymnasium, Court 8
24 August 2017 14:00

Sweden
3

			1	2	3
1	(Philippines) (Sweden)	Jerome Pechera / Christine Garin; Simon Erik Bergström / Louise Mercy Ke Eriksson	15; 21	17; 21
2	(Philippines) (Sweden)	Ruben Haramel Jr. Karl Patrik Lundqvist	22; 20	8; 21	12; 21
3	(Philippines) (Sweden)	Loverly Dezelle Magallano; Amanda Lina Vik Wallin	21; 17	21; 12
4	(Philippines) (Sweden)	Jc Clarito / Joshua Gacis; Simon Erik Bergström / Karl Patrik Lundqvist	14; 21	13; 21
5	(Philippines) (Sweden)	Gilly Chavez / Gielyn Erika Ochoa; Isabella Berfin Aslan / Luise Mercy Ke Eriksson				not played

== Final ranking ==
Pos	Team
1st place, gold medalist(s)	Chinese Taipei
2nd place, silver medalist(s)	Japan
3rd place, bronze medalist(s)	Malaysia
3rd place, bronze medalist(s)	Thailand
5	South Korea
5	Germany
5	Hong Kong
5	Russia
9	Indonesia
10	Poland
11	Australia
11	United States
13	Sri Lanka
13	Canada
13	India
13	France
17	Slovenia
18	Estonia
19	Uganda
19	Brazil
21	Bhutan
21	South Africa
21	Singapore
24	Sweden
25	Philippines
