= Badminton at the 2019 South Asian Games – Women's team =

Badminton – Women's team at the 2019 South Asian Games
- Venue: Badminton Covered Hall
- Dates: 1 – 2 December 2019

Medalists
gold medal	India
silver medal	Sri Lanka
bronze medal	Pakistan
bronze medal	Nepal

The women's team badminton event at the 2019 South Asian Games was held from 1 to 2 December at the Badminton Covered Hall in Pokhara.

== Schedule ==
All times are Nepal Standard Time (UTC+05:45)

Date	Time	Event
Sunday, 1 December	10:00	Quarter-finals
Monday, 2 December	10:00	Semi-finals
Monday, 2 December	17:00	Gold medal match

== Bracket ==
Quarter-finals
Pakistan	3
Maldives	0
Nepal	3
Bangladesh	0

Semi-finals
India	3
Pakistan	0
Nepal	0
Sri Lanka	3

Gold medal match
India	3
Sri Lanka	0

== Quarter-finals ==
=== Pakistan vs Maldives ===
Pakistan
3
Badminton Covered Hall, Court 2
1 December 2019, 10:00

Maldives
0

			1	2	3
1	(Pakistan) (Maldives)	Mahoor Shahzad; Aminath Nabeeha Abdul Razzaq	21; 19	21; 14
2	(Pakistan) (Maldives)	Palwasha Bashir; Neela Najeeb	16; 21	23; 21	21; 17
3	(Pakistan) (Maldives)	Ghazala Siddique; Fathimath Nabaaha Abdul Razzaq	21; 15	21; 15
4	(Pakistan) (Maldives)	Sehra Akram / Huma Javeed; Aminath Nabeeha Abdul Razzaq / Fathimath Nabaaha Abdul Razzaq				not played
5	(Pakistan) (Maldives)	Palwasha Bashir / Mahoor Shahzad; Maisa Fathuhulla Ismail / Neela Najeeb				not played

=== Nepal vs Bangladesh ===
Nepal
3
Badminton Covered Hall, Court 3
1 December 2019, 10:00

Bangladesh
0

			1	2	3
1	(Nepal) (Bangladesh)	Nangsal Tamang; Shapla Akter	21; 18	15; 21	21; 17
2	(Nepal) (Bangladesh)	Rasila Maharjan; Alina Sultana	28; 26	21; 19
3	(Nepal) (Bangladesh)	Jessica Gurung; Bristy Khatun	21; 19	22; 20
4	(Nepal) (Bangladesh)	Amita Giri / Anu Maya Rai; Shapla Akter / Alina Sultana				not played
5	(Nepal) (Bangladesh)	Jessica Gurung / Rasila Maharjan; Bristy Khatun / Rehana Parvin				not played

== Semi-finals ==
=== India vs Pakistan ===
India
3
Badminton Covered Hall, Court 3
2 December 2019, 10:00

Pakistan
0

			1	2	3
1	(India) (Pakistan)	Gayatri Gopichand; Palwasha Bashir	21; 14	21; 11
2	(India) (Pakistan)	Sai Uttejitha Rao Chukka; Mahoor Shahzad	21; 12	21; 18
3	(India) (Pakistan)	Meghana Jakkampudi / N. Sikki Reddy; Sehra Akram / Huma Javeed	21; 14	21; 12
4	(India) (Pakistan)	Shreyanshi Pardeshi; Ghazala Siddique				not played
5	(India) (Pakistan)	Kuhoo Garg / Anoushka Parikh; Palwasha Bashir / Mahoor Shahzad				not played

=== Sri Lanka vs Nepal ===
Sri Lanka
3
Badminton Covered Hall, Court 4
2 December 2019, 10:00

Nepal
0

			1	2	3
1	(Sri Lanka) (Nepal)	Thilini Hendahewa; Nangsal Tamang	21; 8	21; 16
2	(Sri Lanka) (Nepal)	Achini Ratnasiri; Sima Rajbanshi	21; 12	21; 8
3	(Sri Lanka) (Nepal)	Dilmi Dias; Nita Lamsal	21; 8	21; 8
4	(Sri Lanka) (Nepal)	Thilini Hendahewa / Kavidi Sirimannage; Amita Giri / Anu Maya Rai				not played
5	(Sri Lanka) (Nepal)	Achini Ratnasiri / Upuli Weerasinghe; Jessica Gurung / Rasila Maharjan				not played

== Gold medal match ==
=== India vs Sri Lanka ===
India
3
Badminton Covered Hall, Court 2
2 December 2019, 17:00

Sri Lanka
0

			1	2	3
1	(India) (Sri Lanka)	Ashmita Chaliha; Thilini Hendahewa	21; 12	21; 13
2	(India) (Sri Lanka)	Aakarshi Kashyap; Achini Ratnasiri	21; 19	11; 10
3	(India) (Sri Lanka)	Gayatri Gopichand; Dilmi Dias	13; 21	21; 18	21; 10
4	(India) (Sri Lanka)	Meghana Jakkampudi / N. Sikki Reddy; Thilini Hendahewa / Kavidi Sirimannage				not played
5	(India) (Sri Lanka)	Kuhoo Garg / Anoushka Parikh; Achini Ratnasiri / Upuli Weerasinghe				not played
