= Thilini Jayasinghe =

Sri Lankan badminton player

Personal information
- Born: Thilini Sunari Jayasinghe; 15 January 1985 (age 41) Peradeniya, Kandy, Sri Lanka
- Height: 1.64 m (5 ft 5 in)

Sport
- Country: Sri Lanka
- Sport: Badminton
- Handedness: Right

Women's singles & doubles
- Highest ranking: 105 (WS 15 March 2012); 164 (WD 19 January 2012); 193 (XD 26 August 2010)
- BWF profile
Medal record
Women's badminton
Representing Sri Lanka
South Asian Games
Silver medal – second place	2004 Islamabad	Women's team
Silver medal – second place	2006 Colombo	Women's team
Silver medal – second place	2010 Dhaka	Women's team
Bronze medal – third place	2006 Colombo	Women's doubles
Bronze medal – third place	2010 Dhaka	Women's singles

Thilini Sudhara Jayasinghe (Sinhalese: තිලිනි සුනාරි ජයසිංහ; Tamils: திலினி சுனாரி ஜயசிங்க; born 15 January 1985) is a Sri Lankan badminton player. Born in Peradeniya, Jayasinghe started playing badminton aged 9, and has joined the national team in 2000. She attended Mahamaya College and was named Best Sports Woman in 2004. In 2006 and 2010, she competed at the Asian and Commonwealth Games. Jayasinghe also competed for Sri Lanka at the 2008 and 2012 Summer Olympics in the women's singles event. She is the first woman badminton player to have ever represented Sri Lanka at the Olympic Games.

== Achievements ==
=== South Asian Games ===
Women's singles
Year	Venue	Opponent	Score	Result
2010	Wooden-Floor Gymnasium; Dhaka, Bangladesh	(India) Trupti Murgunde	10–21, 18–21	Bronze

Women's doubles
Year	Venue	Partner	Opponent	Score	Result
2006	Sugathadasa Indoor Stadium; Colombo, Sri Lanka	(Sri Lanka) Renu Hettiarachchige	(India) Aparna Balan (India) B. R. Meenakshi	7–21, 14–21	Bronze

=== BWF International Challenge/Series (2 titles, 9 runners-up) ===
Women's singles
Year	Tournament	Opponent	Score	Result
2005	Nepal Satellite	(Sri Lanka) Chandrika de Silva	5–11, 9–11	(silver) Runner-up
2008	Nepal International	(India) Bibari Basumatary	20–22, 21–23	(silver) Runner-up

Women's doubles
Year	Tournament	Partner	Opponent	Score	Result
2007	Iran Fajr International	(Sri Lanka) Chandrika de Silva	(Iran) Negin Amiripour (Iran) Sahar Zamanian	20–22, 21–13, 12–21	(silver) Runner-up
2007	Syria International	(Sri Lanka) Chandrika de Silva	(Iran) Sabereh Kabiri (Iran) Sahar Zamanian	21–13, 21–18	(gold) Winner
2007	Jordan Satellite	(Sri Lanka) Chandrika de Silva	(Iran) Sabereh Kabiri (Iran) Sahar Zamanian	21–19, 21–17	(gold) Winner
2007	Pakistan International	(Sri Lanka) Chandrika de Silva	(India) Jwala Gutta (India) Shruti Kurien	13–21, 14–21	(silver) Runner-up
2008	Iran Fajr International	(Sri Lanka) Chandrika de Silva	(Malaysia) Norshahliza Baharum (Malaysia) Lim Yin Loo	12–21, 15–21	(silver) Runner-up

Mixed doubles
Year	Tournament	Partner	Opponent	Score	Result
2005	Nepal Satellite	(Sri Lanka) Duminda Jayakody	(Sri Lanka) Thushara Edirisinghe (Sri Lanka) Chandrika de Silva	13–15, 4–15	(silver) Runner-up
2005	Sri Lanka Satellite	(Sri Lanka) Niluka Karunaratne	(Sri Lanka) Thushara Edirisinghe (Sri Lanka) N. Palinda Halangoda	15–11, 11–15, 12–15	(silver) Runner-up
2007	Jordan Satellite	(Sri Lanka) Anushaka Lakshan	(Sri Lanka) Diluka Karunaratne (Sri Lanka) Chandrika de Silva	15–21, 21–23	(silver) Runner-up
2011	Bangladesh International	(Sri Lanka) Hasitha Chanaka	(Vietnam) Lê Hà Anh (Vietnam) Lê Thu Huyền	18–21, 15–21	(silver) Runner-up

BWF International Challenge tournament
BWF International Series tournament
BWF Future Series tournament
