= Pashupati Paneru =

Nepalese badminton player

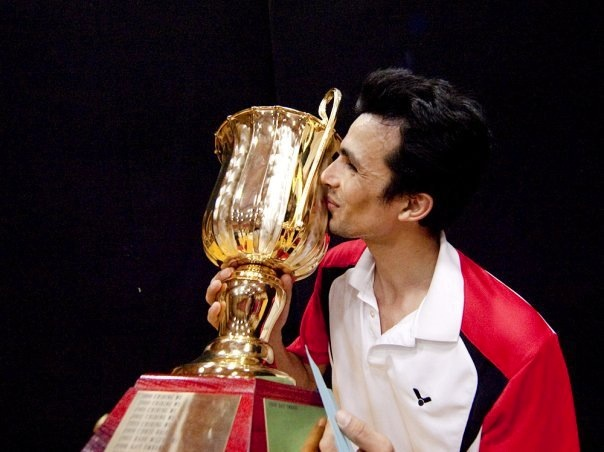

Personal information
- Born: 20 July 1982 (age 43) Dhangadhi, Kailali, Nepal
- Height: 1.75 m (5 ft 9 in)
- Weight: 63 kg (139 lb)

Sport
- Country: Nepal
- Sport: Badminton
- BWF profile
Medal record
Men's badminton
Representing Nepal
South Asian Games
Bronze medal – third place	2006 Colombo	Men's team

Pashupati Paneru (born 20 July 1982) is a retired Nepalese badminton player from Dhangadhi, Kailali, who featured in singles and doubles events in National and the International tournaments. He won fourteen singles, two doubles and three mixed doubles National titles and finished as runner up in numerous other National finals. His record remains among the most successful in Nepal.

== Personal life ==
In his early years, Paneru showed interest in cricket and represented his home town at the Jay Trophy held in Bhairawa. However, he was encouraged to play badminton by his uncle, Umesh Bhandari despite his cricketing success.

== Career ==
Pashupati Paneru claimed bronze medal at the 10th South Asian Games in team event. Paneru participated in six editions of the Asian Championship from 2002 to 2008. He represented Nepal in the Thomas Cup World Team Championship in 2000 and 2006. He won the New York Open, CT Open, Mid-Atlantic Open. His most notable achievement was representing Nepal at the 2006 World Championships in Spain.

He is the recipient of 5th Gorkha Dakshyan Bahu, awarded to individual with exceptional service to the country.

He is made memorable National badminton final performances. Most notably, he came out of a 3-year break to retain APF Krishna Mohan Memorial National Tournament in 2010.

He moved to the US in 2008. He is associated with Wellesley Maugus Club and the Boston Badminton Club.

== Retirement ==
Paneru announced his retirement on 17 January 2013.
