= Bhutan national badminton team =

National badminton team representing Bhutan

Bhutan
- Association: Bhutan Badminton Federation (BBF)
- Confederation: BA (Asia)
- President: Sonam Karma Tshering

BWF ranking
- Current ranking: 116 (2 January 2024)
- Highest ranking: 106 (4 January 2018)

The Bhutan national badminton team (Dzongkha: འབྲུག་པའི་བྱ་སྒྲོ་སྤོ་ལོ་ཨམ་ཚན་གྱིས) represents Bhutan in international badminton team competitions. It is controlled by the Bhutan Badminton Federation (Dzongkha: འབྲུག་རྒྱལ་ཡོངས་སྒྲོ་རྩེད་ཚོགས་པ་གིས་), the national governing body for Bhutanese badminton.

Bhutan made their first team tournament appearance when the men's team competed in the 2016 South Asian Games in Shillong, India. The Bhutanese men's team lost to Nepal and was eliminated in the group stage. The Bhutanese mixed team also competed in the Summer Universiade.

== History ==
Badminton was introduced to Bhutan in the 1990s as part of the nation's economic development and as the nation opened its doors to the outside world. The national team was formed in 1994. Bhutan has been part of the Shuttle Time program organized by the Badminton World Federation since 2012.

=== Men's team ===
The Bhutanese men's team debuted in the 2016 South Asian Games. The team were eliminated in the group stages after losing 3–0 to Nepal, Pakistan and Sri Lanka. The team were eliminated in the group stages again at the 2019 South Asian Games.

=== Women's team ===
The women's team have yet to compete in any international team event.

=== Mixed team ===
The Bhutanese mixed team made their debut at the 2017 Summer Universiade mixed team event. Four players were selected to debut in the event. The team were drawn into Group B with Japan and Poland. The team finished at the bottom of the group after losing 0–5 to Japan and Poland. The team withdrew from the 17th to 23rd place tie against Uganda and finished in 21st place.

== Competitive record ==
=== Thomas Cup ===
Year	Round	Pos
1949	Did not enter	
1952	Did not enter	
1955	Did not enter	
1958	Did not enter	
1961	Did not enter	
1964	Did not enter	
1967	Did not enter	
1970	Did not enter	
1973	Did not enter	
1976	Did not enter	
1979	Did not enter	
1982	Did not enter	
1984	Did not enter	
1986	Did not enter	
1988	Did not enter	
1990	Did not enter	
1992	Did not enter	
1994	Did not enter	
1996	Did not enter	
1998	Did not enter	
2000	Did not enter	
2002	Did not enter	
2004	Did not enter	
2006	Did not enter	
2008	Did not enter	
2010	Did not enter	
2012	Did not enter	
2014	Did not enter	
2016	Did not enter	
2018	Did not enter	
2020	Did not enter	
2022	Did not enter	
2024	Did not enter	
2026	Did not enter	
2028	TBD	
2030	TBD	

=== Uber Cup ===
Year	Round	Pos
1957	Did not enter	
1960	Did not enter	
1963	Did not enter	
1966	Did not enter	
1969	Did not enter	
1972	Did not enter	
1975	Did not enter	
1978	Did not enter	
1981	Did not enter	
1984	Did not enter	
1986	Did not enter	
1988	Did not enter	
1990	Did not enter	
1992	Did not enter	
1994	Did not enter	
1996	Did not enter	
1998	Did not enter	
2000	Did not enter	
2002	Did not enter	
2004	Did not enter	
2006	Did not enter	
2008	Did not enter	
2010	Did not enter	
2012	Did not enter	
2014	Did not enter	
2016	Did not enter	
2018	Did not enter	
2020	Did not enter	
2022	Did not enter	
2024	Did not enter	
2026	Did not enter	
2028	TBD	
2030	TBD	

=== Sudirman Cup ===
Year	Round	Pos
1989	Did not enter	
1991	Did not enter	
1993	Did not enter	
1995	Did not enter	
1997	Did not enter	
1999	Did not enter	
2001	Did not enter	
2003	Did not enter	
2005	Did not enter	
2007	Did not enter	
2009	Did not enter	
2011	Did not enter	
2013	Did not enter	
2015	Did not enter	
2017	Did not enter	
2019	Did not enter	
2021	Did not enter	
2023	Did not enter	
2025	TBD	
2027	TBD	
2029	TBD	

=== Asian Games ===
==== Men's team ====
Year	Round	Pos
1962	Did not enter	
1966	Did not enter	
1970	Did not enter	
1974	Did not enter	
1978	Did not enter	
1982	Did not enter	
1986	Did not enter	
1990	Did not enter	
1994	Did not enter	
1998	Did not enter	
2002	Did not enter	
2006	Did not enter	
2010	Did not enter	
2014	Did not enter	
2018	Did not enter	
2022	Did not enter	
2026	TBD	
2030	TBD	
2034	TBD	
2038	TBD	

==== Women's team ====
Year	Round	Pos
1962	Did not enter	
1966	Did not enter	
1970	Did not enter	
1974	Did not enter	
1978	Did not enter	
1982	Did not enter	
1986	Did not enter	
1990	Did not enter	
1994	Did not enter	
1998	Did not enter	
2002	Did not enter	
2006	Did not enter	
2010	Did not enter	
2014	Did not enter	
2018	Did not enter	
2022	Did not enter	
2026	TBD	
2030	TBD	
2034	TBD	
2038	TBD	

=== Asian Team Championships ===
==== Men's team ====
Year	Round	Pos
1962	Did not enter	
1965	Did not enter	
1969	Did not enter	
1971	Did not enter	
1976	Did not enter	
1983	Did not enter	
1985	Did not enter	
1987	Did not enter	
1989	Did not enter	
1993	Did not enter	
2004	Did not enter	
2006	Did not enter	
2008	Did not enter	
2010	Did not enter	
2012	Did not enter	
2016	Did not enter	
2018	Did not enter	
2020	Did not enter	
2022	Did not enter	
2024	Did not enter	
2026	TBD	
2028	TBD	
2030	TBD	

==== Women's team ====
Year	Round	Pos
2004	Did not enter	
2006	Did not enter	
2008	Did not enter	
2010	Did not enter	
2012	Did not enter	
2016	Did not enter	
2018	Did not enter	
2020	Did not enter	
2022	Did not enter	
2024	Did not enter	
2026	TBD	
2028	TBD	
2030	TBD	

==== Mixed team ====
Year	Round	Pos
2017	Did not enter	
2019	Did not enter	
2023	Did not enter	
2025	TBD	
2027	TBD	
2029	TBD	

=== South Asian Games ===
==== Men's team ====
Year	Round	Pos
2004	Did not enter	
2006	Did not enter	
2010	Did not enter	
2016	Group stage	8th
2019	Quarter-finals	6th
2024	TBD	

==== Women's team ====
Year	Round	Pos
2004	Did not enter	
2006	Did not enter	
2010	Did not enter	
2016	Did not enter	
2019	Did not enter	
2024	TBD	

=== South Asian Team Championships ===
==== Mixed team ====
Year	Round	Pos
2017	Fifth place	5th

=== FISU World University Games ===
==== Mixed team ====
Year	Round	Pos
2007	Did not enter	
2011	Did not enter	
2013	Did not enter	
2015	Did not enter	
2017	Group stage	21st
2021	Did not enter	
2025	TBD	

=== World University Team Championships ===
==== Mixed team ====
Year	Round	Pos
2008	Did not enter	
2010	Did not enter	
2012	Did not enter	
2014	Did not enter	
2016	Did not enter	
2018	Did not enter	

**Red border color indicates tournament was held on home soil.

== Junior competitive record ==
=== Suhandinata Cup ===
Year	Round	Pos
(China) 2000	Did not enter	
(South Africa) 2002	Did not enter	
(Canada) 2004	Did not enter	
(South Korea) 2006	Did not enter	
(New Zealand) 2007	Did not enter	
(India) 2008	Did not enter	
(Malaysia) 2009	Did not enter	
(Mexico) 2010	Did not enter	
(Taiwan) 2011	Did not enter	
(Japan) 2012	Did not enter	
(Thailand) 2013	Did not enter	
(Malaysia) 2014	Did not enter	
(Peru) 2015	Did not enter	
(Spain) 2016	Did not enter	
(Indonesia) 2017	Did not enter	
(Canada) 2018	Did not enter	
(Russia) 2019	Did not enter	
(New Zealand) 2020	Cancelled because of COVID-19 pandemic	
(China) 2021	Cancelled because of COVID-19 pandemic	
(Spain) 2022	Did not enter	
(United States) 2023	Did not enter	
(China) 2024	Did not enter	
(India) 2025	Group stage	36th of 36

=== Asian Junior Team Championships ===
==== Boys' team ====
Year	Round	Pos
1997	Did not enter	
1998	Did not enter	
1999	Did not enter	
2000	Did not enter	
2001	Did not enter	
2002	Did not enter	
2004	Did not enter	
2005	Did not enter	

==== Girls' team ====
Year	Round	Pos
1997	Did not enter	
1998	Did not enter	
1999	Did not enter	
2000	Did not enter	
2001	Did not enter	
2002	Did not enter	
2004	Did not enter	
2005	Did not enter	

==== Mixed team ====
Year	Round	Pos
2006	Group stage	
2007	Did not enter	
2008	Did not enter	
2009	Did not enter	
2010	Did not enter	
2011	Did not enter	
2012	Did not enter	
2013	Did not enter	
2014	Did not enter	
2015	Did not enter	
2016	Did not enter	
2017	Did not enter	
2018	Did not enter	
2019	Did not enter	
2023	Did not enter	
2024	TBD	
2025	TBD	

=== South Asian Junior Team Championships ===
==== Mixed team ====
Year	Round	Pos
2019	Group stage	

**Red border color indicates tournament was held on home soil.

== Staff ==
The following list shows the coaching staff for the national badminton team of Bhutan.

Name	Role
(Bhutan) Norbu Dradhul	Head coach
(Bhutan) Nidup Dorji	Assistant coach
(Bhutan) Sherab Gyaltshen	Assistant coach

== Players ==
=== Current squad ===
As of 2 January 2024

==== Men's team ====
Name	DoB/Age	Ranking of event		
Name	DoB/Age	MS	MD	XD
Anish Gurung	27 January 2000 (age 26)	622	328	–
Jimba Sangay Lhendup	21 July 2002 (age 24)	622	328	–
Ugyen Choeda	25 September 1992 (age 33)	–	–	–
Karma Chendru	28 July 1997 (age 29)	–	–	–
Gazin Wangchuk	10 June 1999 (age 27)	–	–	–
Jamyang Tenzin	27 February 2002 (age 24)	–	–	–

==== Women's team ====
Name	DoB/Age	Ranking of event		
Name	DoB/Age	WS	WD	XD
Samjana Gurung	29 June 2001 (age 25)	–	–	–
Kinley Wangmo	11 December 2002 (age 23)	–	–	–
Thinley Dema	13 January 1998 (age 28)	–	–	–
Lhachen Dema	16 May 1995 (age 31)	–	–	–
Phuntsho Dema	29 May 2003 (age 23)	–	–	–
Phuntsho Choden Thingh	12 June 1996 (age 30)	–	–	–
