= Azeem Sarwar (badminton) =

Pakistani badminton player (born 1991)

Personal information
- Born: 4 March 1991 (age 35)

Sport
- Country: Pakistan
- Sport: Badminton

Men's singles & doubles
- Highest ranking: 519 (MS 27 August 2015); 400 (MD 27 October 2016); 758 (XD 27 October 2016)
- BWF profile

Azeem Sarwar (born 4 March 1991) is a Pakistani badminton player. In 2016, he was the men's doubles champion at the All Pakistan National ranking tournament. He also the runner-up at Pakistan International tournament in the men's doubles event partnered with Muhammad Irfan Saeed Bhatti. In 2017, he and Bhatti won the men's doubles title at the Nepal Annapurna International Badminton Championship.

== Achievements ==
=== BWF International Challenge/Series ===
Men's doubles
Year	Tournament	Partner	Opponent	Score	Result
2016	Pakistan International	(Pakistan) Muhammad Irfan Saeed Bhatti	(Pakistan) Rizwan Azam (Pakistan) Sulehri Kashif Ali	14–21, 13–21	(silver) Runner-up
2017	Pakistan International	(Pakistan) Muhammad Irfan Saeed Bhatti	(Pakistan) Rizwan Azam (Pakistan) Sulehri Kashif Ali	18–21, 18–21	(silver) Runner-up

BWF International Challenge tournament
BWF International Series tournament
BWF Future Series tournament
