= Huma Javeed =

Pakistani badminton player (born 1993)

Personal information
- Born: 6 May 1993 (age 33) Pakistan

Sport
- Country: Pakistan
- Sport: Badminton
- Highest ranking: 570 (WS 27 October 2016) 416 (WD 17 March 2020)
- Current ranking: 759 (WS 16 November 2020); 416 (WD 16 November 2020)
- BWF profile
Medal record
Women's badminton
Representing Pakistan
South Asian Games
Bronze medal – third place	2019 Kathmandu-Pokhara	Women's team

Huma Javeed (born 6 May 1993) is a badminton player from Pakistan.

== Career ==
=== National ===
Javeed represents WAPDA in domestic competitions including National Championships and National Games.

2020

At the 57th National Badminton Championship held in Lahore, Pakistan, Javeed partnered with Sehra Akram in the women's doubles where they were beaten by Mahoor Shahzad (Wapda) and Palwasha Bashir (NBP) in 2 sets (21-9 and 21–8).

=== International ===
Javeed was part of the six-member Pakistani women's team which competed at the 2019 South Asian Games held in Kathmandu, Nepal.
