= Badminton at the 2006 South Asian Games =

- Venue: Sugathadasa Indoor Stadium
- Dates: 16–22 August

Badminton at the 2006 South Asian Games was held in Sugathadasa Indoor Stadium in Colombo, Sri Lanka between 16 and 22 August 2006. The badminton programme in 2006 included men's and women's singles competitions; men's, women's and mixed doubles competitions along with men's and women's team events.

== Medal summary ==
=== Medal table ===
* Host nation (Sri Lanka)

Rank	Nation	Gold	Silver	Bronze	Total
1	India (IND)	7	4	1	12
2	Sri Lanka (SRI)*	0	3	4	7
3	Pakistan (PAK)	0	0	6	6
4	Nepal (NEP)	0	0	3	3
Totals (4 entries)		7	7	14	28

=== Medalists ===
The following players who won medals at the Games.

Event	Gold	Silver	Bronze
Men's singles	Chetan Anand; India	Nikhil Kanetkar; India	Omar Zeeshan; Pakistan
Men's singles	Chetan Anand; India	Nikhil Kanetkar; India	Wajid Ali Chaudhry; Pakistan
Women's singles	Trupti Murgunde; India	B. R. Meenakshi; India	Chandrika de Silva; Sri Lanka
Women's singles	Trupti Murgunde; India	B. R. Meenakshi; India	Sumina Shrestha; Nepal
Men's doubles	India (IND); Rupesh Kumar K. T. Sanave Thomas	Sri Lanka (SRI); Thushara Edirisinghe; Duminda Jayakody	Pakistan (PAK); Muhammad Atique; Rizwan Azam
Men's doubles	India (IND); Rupesh Kumar K. T. Sanave Thomas	Sri Lanka (SRI); Thushara Edirisinghe; Duminda Jayakody	India (IND); Akshay Dewalkar; Jishnu Sanyal
Women's doubles	India (IND); Shruti Kurien; Jwala Gutta	India (IND); Aparna Balan; B. R. Meenakshi	Sri Lanka (SRI); Thilini Jayasinghe; Chandrika de Silva
Women's doubles	India (IND); Shruti Kurien; Jwala Gutta	India (IND); Aparna Balan; B. R. Meenakshi	Sri Lanka (SRI); Nadeesha Gayanthi; Rasangi Ranatunge
Mixed doubles	India (IND); Valiyaveetil Diju; Jwala Gutta	India (IND); Thomas Kurian; Aparna Balan	Sri Lanka (SRI); Thushara Edirisinghe; Chandrika de Silva
Mixed doubles	India (IND); Valiyaveetil Diju; Jwala Gutta	India (IND); Thomas Kurian; Aparna Balan	Pakistan (PAK); Waqas Ahmed; Saima Manzoor
Men's team	India (IND); Chetan Anand; Akshay Dewalkar; Valiyaveetil Diju; Nikhil Kanetkar; Rupesh Kumar K. T. Thomas Kurian; Jishnu Sanyal; Sanave Thomas	Sri Lanka (SRI); Thushara Edirisinghe; Duminda Jayakody; Dinuka Karunaratne; Niluka Karunaratne	Nepal (NEP); Ram Singh Chaudhari; Anil Kumar Lakhe; Indra Mahata; Pashupati Paneru; Balaram Thapa
Men's team	India (IND); Chetan Anand; Akshay Dewalkar; Valiyaveetil Diju; Nikhil Kanetkar; Rupesh Kumar K. T. Thomas Kurian; Jishnu Sanyal; Sanave Thomas	Sri Lanka (SRI); Thushara Edirisinghe; Duminda Jayakody; Dinuka Karunaratne; Niluka Karunaratne	Pakistan (PAK); Waqas Ahmed; Muhammad Atique; Rizwan Azam; Wajid Ali Chaudhry; Zafar Tasneem; Omar Zeeshan
Women's team	India (IND); Aparna Balan; Krishna Dekaraja; Oli Deka; Jwala Gutta; Shruti Kurien; B. R. Meenakshi; Trupti Murgunde	Sri Lanka (SRI); Nadeesha Gayanthi; Thilini Jayasinghe; Rasangi Ranatunge; Chandrika de Silva	Nepal (NEP); Samjhana Khaling; Sujana Shrestha; Sumina Shrestha; Sara Devi Tamang; Neri Thapa
Women's team	India (IND); Aparna Balan; Krishna Dekaraja; Oli Deka; Jwala Gutta; Shruti Kurien; B. R. Meenakshi; Trupti Murgunde	Sri Lanka (SRI); Nadeesha Gayanthi; Thilini Jayasinghe; Rasangi Ranatunge; Chandrika de Silva	Pakistan (PAK); Aisha Akram; Asma Butt; Uzma Butt; Saima Manzoor; Farzana Saleem

== Results ==
=== Men's singles ===
Semifinal
(India) Chetan Anand	21	16	21
(Pakistan) Omar Zeeshan	10	21	7
(Pakistan) Wajid Ali Chaudhry	10	12
(India) Nikhil Kanetkar	21	21

Final
(India) Chetan Anand	21	21
(India) Nikhil Kanetkar	14	12

=== Women's singles ===
Semifinal
(India) Trupti Murgunde	21	21
(Sri Lanka) Chandrika de Silva	11	10
(Nepal) Sumina Shrestha	9	4
(India) B. R. Meenakshi	21	21

Final
(India) Trupti Murgunde	21	21
(India) B. R. Meenakshi	5	14

=== Men's doubles ===
Semi-finals
(India) Rupesh Kumar K. T. (India) Sanave Thomas	21	21
(Pakistan) Muhammad Atique (Pakistan) Rizwan Azam	17	13
(Sri Lanka) Thushara Edirisinghe (Sri Lanka) Duminda Jayakody	21	16	21
(India) Akshay Dewalkar (India) Jishnu Sanyal	13	21	16

Final
(India) Rupesh Kumar K. T. (India) Sanave Thomas	21	21
(Sri Lanka) Thushara Edirisinghe (Sri Lanka) Duminda Jayakody	16	10

=== Women's doubles ===
Semi-finals
(India) Aparna Balan (India) B. R. Meenakshi	21	21
(Sri Lanka) Thilini Jayasinghe (Sri Lanka) Chandrika de Silva	7	14
(Sri Lanka) Nadeesha Gayanthi (Sri Lanka) Rasangi Ranatunge	10	10
(India) Shruti Kurien (India) Jwala Gutta	21	21

Final
(India) Aparna Balan (India) B. R. Meenakshi	21	21	12
(India) Shruti Kurien (India) Jwala Gutta	18	23	21

=== Mixed doubles ===
Semi-finals
(India) Valiyaveetil Diju (India) Jwala Gutta	19	21	21
(Pakistan) Waqas Ahmed (Pakistan) Saima Manzoor	21	15	17
(Sri Lanka) Thushara Edirisinghe (Sri Lanka) Chandrika de Silva	12	9
(India) Thomas Kurian (India) Aparna Balan	21	21

Final
(India) Valiyaveetil Diju (India) Jwala Gutta	21	21
(India) Thomas Kurian (India) Aparna Balan	11	13
