= Rizwan Azam =

Pakistani badminton player (born 1985)

Personal information
- Born: 2 February 1985 (age 41)
- Height: 1.88 m (6 ft 2 in)

Sport
- Country: Pakistan
- Sport: Badminton

Men's singles & doubles
- Highest ranking: 289 (MS 15 October 2009); 110 (MD 16 September 2010); 102 (XD 22 September 2016)
Medal record
Men's badminton
Representing Pakistan
South Asian Games
Bronze medal – third place	2006 Colombo	Men's doubles
Bronze medal – third place	2006 Colombo	Men's team
Bronze medal – third place	2010 Dhaka	Men's doubles
Bronze medal – third place	2016 Guwahati–Shillong	Men's doubles
Bronze medal – third place	2016 Guwahati–Shillong	Men's team

Rizwan Azam (born 2 February 1985) is a Pakistani badminton player who also play in the Australian circuit, and was the National champion in both Pakistan and Australia. Azam was the men's doubles bronze medalists at the South Asian Games in 2006, 2010 and 2016, also in the team event in 2006 and 2016. At the BWF circuit, he was the men's singles champion in Pakistan International, also won the men's doubles titles in Syria, Maldives, and Pakistan.

== Achievements ==
=== South Asian Games ===
Men's doubles
Year	Venue	Partner	Opponent	Score	Result
2006	Sugathadasa Indoor Stadium; Colombo, Sri Lanka	(Pakistan) Muhammad Atique	(India) Rupesh Kumar K. T. (India) Sanave Thomas	17–21, 13–21	Bronze
2010	Wooden-Floor Gymnasium; Dhaka, Bangladesh	(Pakistan) Sulehri Kashif Ali	(India) Rupesh Kumar K. T. (India) Sanave Thomas	14–21, 13–21	Bronze
2016	Multipurpose Hall SAI–SAG Centre; Shillong, India	(Pakistan) Sulehri Kashif Ali	(India) Pranav Chopra (India) Akshay Dewalkar	22–24, 16–21	Bronze

=== BWF International Challenge/Series ===
Men's singles
Year	Tournament	Opponent	Score	Result
2016	Pakistan International	(Pakistan) Muhammad Irfan Saeed Bhatti	21–15, 21–18	(gold) Winner

Men's doubles
Year	Tournament	Partner	Opponent	Score	Result
2007	Syria International	(Pakistan) Muhammad Atique	(Sri Lanka) Diluka Karunaratne (Sri Lanka) Dinuka Karunaratne	21–9, 21–15	(gold) Winner
2007	Pakistan International	(Pakistan) Muhammad Atique	(Pakistan) Sulehri Kashif Ali (Pakistan) Ahmad Muhammad Waqas	17–21, 18–21	(silver) Runner-up
2008	Nepal International	(Pakistan) Muhammad Atique	(India) Akshay Dewalkar (India) Valiyaveetil Diju	21–19, 10–21, 12–21	(silver) Runner-up
2008	Syria International	(Pakistan) Muhammad Atique	(Iran) Mohammadreza Kheradmandi (Iran) Ali Shahhosseini	19–21, 18–21	(silver) Runner-up
2010	Maldives International	(Pakistan) Sulehri Kashif Ali	(Sri Lanka) Dinuka Karunaratne (Sri Lanka) Niluka Karunaratne	18–21, 21–18, 21–15	(gold) Winner
2010	Syria International	(Pakistan) Sulehri Kashif Ali	(Bahrain) Ebrahim Jafar Al Sayed Jafar (Bahrain) Heri Setiawan	21–18, 21–18	(gold) Winner
2015	Waikato International	(Australia) Michael Fariman	(Australia) Matthew Chau (Australia) Sawan Serasinghe	16–21, 15–21	(silver) Runner-up
2016	Pakistan International	(Pakistan) Sulehri Kashif Ali	(Pakistan) Muhammad Irfan Saeed Bhatti (Pakistan) Azeem Sarwar	21–14, 21–13	(gold) Winner
2016	Nepal International	(Pakistan) Sulehri Kashif Ali	(India) Arjun M.R. (India) Ramchandran Shlok	18–21, 15–21	(silver) Runner-up
2017	Pakistan International	(Pakistan) Sulehri Kashif Ali	(Pakistan) Muhammad Irfan Saeed Bhatti (Pakistan) Azeem Sarwar	21–18, 21–18	(gold) Winner

BWF International Challenge tournament
BWF International Series tournament
BWF Future Series tournament
