= North Eastern Indira Gandhi Regional Institute of Health and Medical Sciences =

Medical institute in Shillong, India

Coordinates: 25.5907°N 91.9398°E

- Motto: Ad Scientia Et Vita
- Motto in English: Towards Knowledge and Life
- Type: Tertiary care hospital, Autonomous Institute
- Established: 1987; 39 years ago
- Parent institution: MoHFW
- Affiliations: National Medical Commission
- Academic affiliations: North Eastern Hill University
- Endowment: ₹565.26 crore (US$59 million) (2026–27 est.)
- Budget: ₹1,125.93 crore (US$120 million) (2024–25 est.)
- Director: Dr. Nalin Mehta
- Location: Mawdiangdiang, Shillong, Meghalaya, 793018, India
- Campus: 273 acres (110 ha); Suburban
- Language: English
- Website: www.neigrihms.gov.in

North Eastern Indira Gandhi Regional Institute of Health and Medical Sciences (NEIGRIHMS) is a medical institute of India in Shillong, Meghalaya. It is located on the outskirts of the educational hub hills City of the Northeastern India, Shillong, the "Scotland of the East". The present full-fledged tertiary care hospital facilities started at its permanent campus at Mawdiangdiang, Shillong in the year 2007. It is an autonomous Institute under the Ministry of Health and Family Welfare, Govt. of India in 1987 and declared as "Centre of excellence" by the parliament of India. The MBBS teaching programme of NEIGRIHMS started in 2008 with intake of 50 (fifty) students, followed by Post graduate courses in the following 4 subjects - Anaesthesiology, Microbiology, Obstetrics & Gynaecology and Pathology in the year 2009. Further PG courses have been started in the following subjects - Anatomy, General Medicine, General Surgery, Radiodiagnosis and Orthopaedics. The Institute also offers DM course in Cardiology. Besides, there is B. Sc Nursing and M. Sc Nursing courses (annual intake of 50 seats in B.Sc and 10 seats in M.Sc) being run by the Institute's College of Nursing.The College of Nursing started its courses from the year 2006.

The Institute was formally inaugurated and dedicated to the nation on 5 March 2010 by the chairperson of the UPA government, Smt Sonia Gandhi, the institute functioned from its present campus at Mawdiangdiang for some years before that.

NEIGRIHMS is not only an educational institute that imparts postgraduate medical training and undergraduate medical training, but also a working hospital that provides inexpensive medical care to patients. The institute is established on the lines of AIIMS New Delhi and PGIMER Chandigarh, to provide tertiary care to the people of North-East India.

The institute is named after Indira Gandhi, former Prime Minister of India.

NEIGRIHMS offers services in specialties like General Surgery, Orthopaedics, Cardiology, Ophthalmology, Otorhinolaryngology, Pediatrics, Urology, CTVS, General Medicine, Blood Bank, Pathology, Biochemistry, etc.

MD & MS Course started in initially in 4 disciplines affiliated to North Eastern Hill University (NEHU) (A central University). The approval to start the Post Graduate course in NEIGRIHMS was conveyed by the Ministry vide Office Memorandum No-U-12012/7/2008-NE dated 19 May 2008. After inspection under the Chairmanship of Dr. A. K. Aggarwal, Add. Director General, DGHS, the Ministry vide letter No.U-12012/7/2008-NE (Pt) dated 19 March 2009 permitted to start Post Graduate Courses with 2 seats, each in 4 departments namely Anaesthesiology, Pathology, Microbiology and Obstetrics & Gynaecology.

== Clinical services offered ==
The hospital complex consist of Out patient department (OPD) which provides various services to the people in an out-patient settings via different departments, and an In-Patient department (IPD) which is for patient admitted under various departments. There is availability of Intensive Care Units (ICUs), two Operating Theatre (OT) complexes as well as the Emergency Room which is available round the clock.

Various departments available in the facility for patient care are:

- Orthopedics
- General Surgery
- Radiology
- Blood Bank
- Obstetrics and Gynecology
- General Medicine
- Anesthesiology
- Cardio-thoracic and vascular surgery (CTVS)
- Cardiology
- Ophthalmology
- ENT
- Pediatrics
- Urology
- Neurosurgery
- Oncology and Oncosurgery
- Neurology
- Dermatology and STI clinic
- Psychiatry
- DOTS center with DMC
- ART center
- Physiotherapy
- Dietician

There are facilities like MRI, Ultrasound, Doppler, Echocardiography, Gastro-endoscopy etc. In the surgical discipline there are facilities like Total hip and knee Joint replacement, Arthroscopy, X-ray guided orthopaedic fracture surgery, Laparoscopic Surgeries, Bronchoscopy, and FESS. PTCA and CABG bypass procedures are available for coronary artery diseases. Closure of a congenital hole in heart (ASD/VSD/PDA) surgery are done as well. It has a blood bank with component separation facility like fresh frozen plasma, platelet concentrate etc.

== Facility for marginalized people and weaker and vulnerable section ==
The hospital offers free treatment to patients having a BPL Card from the state government. Being a central government funded hospital NIAF or Rashtryiya Arogya Nidhi scheme can offer treatment/drugs/implants etc. free of cost. JSY or Janani Suraksha Yojna offers money to all mothers delivering babies in NEIGRIHMS Hospital for mother and child care. Free vaccination according to the national immunization programme is provided in paediatric OPD. Facility of superspeciality care like Cardiology, Urology, Nephrology etc. are also available here. A Bank of Baroda branch with an atm and an India Post office is available within the premises.

== Past regular Directors ==
▪ Dr. A. K. Borooah

▪ Dr. Farukh A. Ahmed

▪ Dr. Robin Kumar Sarma

▪ Dr. M. E. Yeolekar

▪ Dr. A. G. Ahangar

▪ Dr. D. M. Thapa (2017–2020)

== Campus ==
The campus is located on a hilly terrain, on the outskirts of Shillong. There is availability of undergraduate MBBS hostels for both boys and girls, Nurses hostel, Quarters for professors and teachers along with a Guest House with 12 rooms. An indoor stadium for daily recreation and sports such as basketball, volleyball, badminton is available in addition to a tennis court and a swimming pool are also available within the campus.

A central library with a vast collection of medical books and journals along with internet connectivity, photocopy and printing facilities are available to everyone in the campus.

== Education ==
50 Students are admitted every year for the undergraduate course of MBBS from 8 north eastern states and from All India quota after qualifying NEET UG. Also doctors get admitted in various departments of the institute for postgraduate courses after qualifying NEET PG. A seat for Cardiology superspeciality is filled every year from NEET SS

B.Sc. Nursing and M.Sc. Nursing courses are also available under NEHU. Entrance exams are conducted by the institute every year.

== Medium of Teaching ==
English

== Location ==
The institute is located on a vast campus at Mawdiangdiang on the outskirts of Shillong (also called New Shillong nowadays), about 8.7 km from Shillong city and takes about 40 minutes to drive to. The best way to reach NEIGRIHMS is from the Police Bazaar through Polo Bazaar- NEEPCO Office - Demseiniong - Nongmynsong - Project Setuk HQ-NEIGRIHMS, Mawdiangdiang. The closest town is Nongmensong which is 10 minutes drive away from the institute. Cabs and other means of public transport can easily be availed from the city.

== Transport ==
City buses, Supplementary State Transport (Tata Magic) and cabs (Maruti 800 and Alto) ply at intervals from various places of Shillong to Mawdiangdiang.

== Achievements ==
The hospital was adjudged the cleanest hospital/institute (Group 'B') in India for the year 2017-2018 under Kayakalp Scheme of the Ministry of Health and Family Welfare, Government of India and was awarded the 1st prize money of ₹1,50,00,000 for it.
