= 2014 BWF World Junior Championships – Teams event =

2014 BWF World Junior Championships - Team event
Tournament details
- Dates: 7–11 April
- Edition: 16th
- Level: International
- Nations: 33
- Venue: Stadium Sultan Abdul Halim
- Location: Alor Setar, Malaysia

The Team event tournament of the 2014 BWF World Junior Championships was the sixteenth tournament of the BWF World Junior Championships. It was held from April 7–11, 2014 in Alor Setar, Malaysia. According to the Badminton World Federation (BWF) 35 teams have confirmed their participation. The winner of the tournament would have Suhandinata Cup for about a year until the next BWF World Junior Championships Team Event is held.

== Seedings ==
The seedings for teams competing in the tournament were released on March 24, 2014. It was based on aggregated points from the best players in the world junior ranking, the result of last BWF World Junior Championships team event, and also the result of last continental junior event. The tournament was divided into four groups and each group has 2 subgroups, with South Korea and China were the two top seeds, and 2 teams (Indonesia and Japan) in the seeded 3-4 were also put into the same group. another 4 teams were put in the second groups. Eight teams (seeded 9-16) were seeded into third groups and the last sixteen teams were seeded into last groups. The draw was held on the same day in Kuala Lumpur.

=== Group 1 ===
(Seeded 1-4)

1. South Korea
2. China
3. Indonesia
4. Japan

=== Group 2 ===
(Seeded 5-8)

5. Malaysia
6. Thailand
7. Chinese Taipei
8. Hong Kong

=== Group 3 ===
(Seeded 9-16)

9. Vietnam
10. Singapore
11. Denmark
12. France
13. Russia
14. India
15. Germany
16. Bulgaria

=== Group 4 ===
(Seeded 17-35)

17. Canada
18. Australia
19. Sri Lanka
20. Czech Republic
21. South Africa
22. Spain
23. Armenia
24. United States
25. Botswana
26. Philippines
27. Uzbekistan
28. England
29. Netherlands
30. ~~Afghanistan~~ (Withdrew)
31. Macau
32. Slovenia
33. Mongolia (Debut)
34. Egypt
35. ~~Zambia~~ (Withdrew)

== Group stage ==
Qualified for quarterfinals

=== Group W1 ===
Team	Pts	Pld	W	L	MF	MA
South Korea	3	3	3	0	15	0
Singapore	2	3	2	1	10	5
Botswana	1	3	1	2	5	10
Mongolia	0	3	0	3	0	15

April 7, 2014
South Korea	5-0	Botswana
April 7, 2014
Singapore	5-0	Mongolia
April 8, 2014
South Korea	5-0	Mongolia
April 8, 2014
Singapore	5-0	Botswana
April 8, 2014
South Korea	5-0	Singapore
April 8, 2014
Mongolia	0-5	Botswana

=== Group W2 ===
Team	Pts	Pld	W	L	MF	MA
Thailand	3	3	3	0	15	0
Russia	2	3	2	1	9	6
Netherlands	1	3	1	2	6	9
South Africa	0	3	0	3	0	15

April 7, 2014
Thailand	5-0	Netherlands
April 7, 2014
Russia	5-0	South Africa
April 7, 2014
Thailand	5-0	South Africa
April 7, 2014
Russia	4-1	Netherlands
April 8, 2014
Thailand	5-0	Russia
April 8, 2014
South Africa	0-5	Netherlands

=== Group X1 ===
Team	Pts	Pld	W	L	MF	MA
Indonesia	3	3	3	0	15	0
Germany	2	3	2	1	6	9
Canada	1	3	1	2	5	10
Sri Lanka	0	3	0	3	4	11

April 7, 2014
Indonesia	5-0	Sri Lanka
April 7, 2014
Germany	3-2	Canada
April 7, 2014
Indonesia	5-0	Canada
April 7, 2014
Germany	3-2	Sri Lanka
April 8, 2014
Indonesia	5-0	Germany
April 8, 2014
Canada	3-2	Sri Lanka

=== Group X2 ===
Team	Pts	Pld	W	L	MF	MA
Hong Kong	4	4	4	0	20	0
Philippines	3	4	3	1	15	5
Bulgaria	2	4	2	2	8	12
Czech Republic	1	4	1	3	6	14
Macau	0	4	0	4	1	19

April 7, 2014
Bulgaria	3-2	Czech Republic
April 7, 2014
Macau	0-5	Philippines
April 7, 2014
Hong Kong	5-0	Czech Republic
April 7, 2014
Bulgaria	0-5	Philippines
April 7, 2014
Hong Kong	5-0	Macau
April 8, 2014
Hong Kong	5-0	Philippines
April 8, 2014
Bulgaria	5-0	Macau
April 8, 2014
Hong Kong	5-0	Bulgaria
April 8, 2014
Macau	1-4	Czech Republic
April 8, 2014
Philippines	5-0	Czech Republic

=== Group Y1 ===
Team	Pts	Pld	W	L	MF	MA
Japan	3	3	3	0	15	0
Spain	2	3	2	1	7	8
France	1	3	1	2	7	8
Armenia	0	3	0	3	1	14

April 7, 2014
Japan	5-0	Spain
April 7, 2014
France	5-0	Armenia
April 7, 2014
Japan	5-0	Armenia
April 7, 2014
France	2-3	Spain
April 8, 2014
Japan	5-0	France
April 8, 2014
Armenia	1-4	Spain

=== Group Y2 ===
Team	Pts	Pld	W	L	MF	MA
Chinese Taipei	3	3	3	0	12	3
Denmark	2	3	2	1	10	5
England	0	3	1	2	8	7
Egypt	0	3	0	2	0	15

April 7, 2014
England	5-0	Egypt
April 7, 2014
Denmark	5-0	Egypt
April 7, 2014
Chinese Taipei	4-1	England
April 8, 2014
Chinese Taipei	5-0	Egypt
April 8, 2014
Denmark	3-2	England
April 8, 2014
Chinese Taipei	3-2	Denmark

=== Group Z1 ===
Team	Pts	Pld	W	L	MF	MA
China	3	3	3	0	15	0
Vietnam	2	3	2	1	10	5
United States	1	3	1	2	5	10
Slovenia	0	3	0	3	0	15

April 7, 2014
China	5-0	Slovenia
April 7, 2014
Vietnam	5-0	United States
April 8, 2014
China	5-0	United States
April 8, 2014
Vietnam	5-0	Slovenia
April 8, 2014
China	5-0	Vietnam
April 8, 2014
United States	5-0	Slovenia

=== Group Z2 ===
Team	Pts	Pld	W	L	MF	MA
Malaysia	3	3	3	0	13	2
India	2	3	2	1	10	5
Australia	1	3	1	2	7	8
Uzbekistan	0	3	0	3	0	15

April 7, 2014
India	3-2	Australia
April 7, 2014
Malaysia	5-0	Australia
April 7, 2014
Malaysia	5-0	Uzbekistan
April 8, 2014
India	5-0	Uzbekistan
April 8, 2014
Malaysia	3-2	India
April 8, 2014
Uzbekistan	0-5	Australia

== Knockout stage ==
Quarterfinals
W1	South Korea	0
W2	Thailand	3
X1	Indonesia	3
X2	Hong Kong	0
Y1	Japan	3
Y2	Chinese Taipei	2
Z1	China	3
Z2	Malaysia	1

Semifinals
W2	Thailand	2
X1	Indonesia	3
Y1	Japan	2
Z1	China	3

Final
X1	Indonesia	0
Z1	China	3

=== Final ===
Indonesia
0
Stadium Sultan Abdul Halim Court 1
11 April 2014

China
3

			1	2	3
1	(Indonesia) (China)	Muhammad Rian Ardianto / Rosyita Eka Putri Sari; Huang Kaixiang / Chen Qingchen	14; 21	21; 17	17; 21
2	(Indonesia) (China)	Jonatan Christie; Shi Yuqi	19; 21	20; 22
3	(Indonesia) (China)	Muhammad Rian Ardianto / Clinton Hendrik Kudamassa; Huang Kaixiang / Zheng Siwei	22; 20	12; 21	18; 21
4	(Indonesia) (China)	Ruselli Hartawan; He Bingjiao				not played
5	(Indonesia) (China)	Rosyita Eka Putri Sari / Apriani Rahayu; Chen Qingchen / Jia Yifan				not played

== Final team ranking ==
1. China [2]
2. Indonesia [3/4]
3. Thailand [5/8]
4. Japan [3/4]
5. South Korea [1]
6. Malaysia [5/8]
7. Chinese Taipei [5/8]
8. Hong Kong [5/8]
9. Denmark [9/16]
10. Singapore [9/16]
11. Germany [9/16]
12. Vietnam [9/16]
13. India [9/16]
14. Russia [9/16]
15. Philippines
16. Spain
17. England
18. Netherlands
19. Canada
20. United States
21. France [9/16]
22. Bulgaria [9/16]
23. Australia
24. Botswana
25. Sri Lanka
26. Slovenia
27. Egypt
28. South Africa
29. Czech Republic
30. Uzbekistan
31. Armenia
32. Mongolia
33. Macau
34. ~~Afghanistan~~ (Withdrew)
35. ~~Zambia~~ (Withdrew)
