= Magdalena Witek =

Polish badminton player (born 1994)

Personal information
- Born: 20 March 1994 (age 32) Słupsk, Poland
- Height: 1.77 m (5 ft 10 in)
- Weight: 66 kg (146 lb)

Sport
- Country: Poland
- Sport: Badminton
- Handedness: Left
- Coached by: Andrzej Sieradzki

Women's singles & doubles
- Highest ranking: 851 (WS 4 October 2012); 108 (WD 4 June 2015); 230 (XD 25 June 2015)
- BWF profile

Magdalena Witek (born 20 March 1994) is a Polish badminton player.

== Achievements ==
=== BWF International Challenge/Series ===
Women's doubles
Year	Tournament	Partner	Opponent	Score	Result
2014	Slovak Open	(Poland) Aneta Wojtkowska	(Croatia) Katarina Galenić (Netherlands) Cheryl Seinen	7–11, 9–11, 11–5, 7–11	(silver) Runner-up
2014	Norwegian International	(Poland) Aneta Wojtkowska	(Denmark) Tilde Iversen (Sweden) Emma Wengberg	13–21, 15–21	(silver) Runner-up
2017	Welsh International	(Poland) Kornelia Marczak	(Belgium) Lise Jaques (Belgium) Flore Vandenhoucke	10–21, 15–21	(silver) Runner-up

BWF International Challenge tournament
BWF International Series tournament
BWF Future Series tournament
