= 1993 South Asian Games =

VI South Asian Games ৬ষ্ঠ দক্ষিণ এশীয় গেমস
- Host city: Dhaka, Bangladesh
- Nations: 7
- Events: 11 Sports
- Opening: December 20
- Closing: December 27
- Opened by: Abdur Rahman Biswas, President of Bangladesh
- Main venue: Bangabandhu National Stadium

The 1993 South Asian Games, officially the 6th South Asian Games, took place from December 20 to December 27, 1993, in Dhaka, Bangladesh and thus in SAF games history, Dhaka became the first city to host the event for second time.

== Participating nations ==
A total of 7 countries participated in the 1993 South Asian Games.

- Bangladesh
- Bhutan
- India
- Maldives
- Nepal
- Pakistan
- Sri Lanka

== Sports ==
There were 11 official sports for the 6th SAF Games. They were:

- Athletics
- Boxing
- Football
- Judo (debut)
- Kabaddi
- Shooting
- Swimming
- Table Tennis
- Tennis
- Volleyball
- Weightlifting

== Medal tally ==
* Host nation (Bangladesh)

Rank	Nation	Gold	Silver	Bronze	Total
1	India	60	46	31	137
2	Pakistan	23	22	20	65
3	Sri Lanka	20	22	39	81
4	Bangladesh*	11	19	32	62
5	Nepal	1	6	15	22
6	Bhutan	0	0	0	0
6	Maldives	0	0	0	0
Totals (7 entries)		115	115	137	367
