= 1995 South Asian Games =

VII South Asian Games VII தெற்காசிய விளையாட்டு
- Host city: Madras, India
- Nations: 7
- Events: 14 Sports
- Opening: 18 December
- Closing: 27 December
- Opened by: Shankar Dayal Sharma, President of India
- Main venue: Jawaharlal Nehru Stadium

The 1995 South Asian Games (or 7th SAF Games) were held in Madras, India between 18 and 27 December 1995.

== Medal tally ==
* Host nation (India)

Rank	Nation	Gold	Silver	Bronze	Total
1	India*	106	60	19	185
2	Sri Lanka	16	25	53	94
3	Pakistan	10	33	36	79
4	Bangladesh	7	17	34	58
5	Nepal	4	8	16	28
6	Bhutan	0	0	2	2
7	Maldives	0	0	1	1
Totals (7 entries)		143	143	161	447

== Sports ==
- Athletics ()
- Basketball ()
- Boxing ()
- Football ()
- Field hockey () (debut)
- Judo ()
- Kabaddi ()
- Shooting ()
- Swimming
- Table tennis ()
- Tennis ()
- Volleyball ()
- Weightlifting ()
- Wrestling ()
