= 1999 South Asian Games =

8th South Asian Games
- Host city: Kathmandu, Nepal
- Nations: 7
- Events: 12 Sports
- Opening: 25 September 1999
- Closing: 4 October 1999
- Opened by: Birendra Bir Bikram Shah Dev, King of Nepal
- Main venue: Dasarath Rangasala Stadium

The 1999 South Asian Games (or 8th SAF Games) were held in Kathmandu, Nepal (for the second time) from 25 September to 4 October 1999. King Birendra Bir Bikram Shah Dev declared the games open amidst a grand ceremony.

1069 athletes of the different seven SAARC countries participated in the twelve sports.

In the final medal count, India took first position and taking the advantages of host country Nepal amazingly took second position followed by Sri Lanka, Pakistan, Bangladesh, Bhutan and Maldives. Out of 523 medals India had the most, with 102 gold, 58 silver and 37 bronze, Nepal then took 31 gold, 10 silver and 24 bronze, Sri Lanka 16 gold 42 silver and 62 bronze, Pakistan 10 gold, 36 silver and 30 bronze, Bangladesh 2 gold, 10 silver and 35 bronze, Bhutan 1 gold, 6 silver and 7 bronze, Maldives 4 bronze. None of the participant countries went back empty hand without having medals. Even Bhutan and Maldives had the benefit of medals.

== The games ==
=== Sports ===
There were 12 sports including 2 new sports, Karate and Taekwondo.

- Athletics
- Boxing
- Football
- Kabaddi
- Karate (debut)
- Shooting
- Swimming
- Table tennis
- Taekwondo (debut)
- Volleyball
- Weightlifting
- Wrestling

=== Medal table ===
A total of 523 medals comprising 162 Gold medals, 162 Silver medals and 199 Bronze medals were awarded to athletes. The host Nepal's performance was their best ever yet in South Asian Games and were placed only second to India.

* Host nation (Nepal)

Rank	Nation	Gold	Silver	Bronze	Total
1	India (IND)	102	58	37	197
2	Nepal (NEP)*	31	10	24	65
3	Sri Lanka (SRI)	16	42	62	120
4	Pakistan (PAK)	10	36	30	76
5	Bangladesh (BAN)	2	10	35	47
6	Bhutan (BHU)	1	6	7	14
7	Maldives (MDV)	0	0	4	4
Totals (7 entries)		162	162	199	523

Note: 28 Golds of Nepal came from Taekwondo and Karate. The gold medal won by Pramila Thapa in taekwondo was the first gold medal in Nepal's taekwondo history and sports council's history.
