= Logos and mascots of the South Asian Games =

The 'South Asian Games are a biennial multi-sport event held among the athletes from South Asia. The governing body of these games is South Asia Olympic Council, formed in 1983. At present, SAG are joined by eight members namely Afghanistan, Bangladesh, Bhutan, India, Maldives, Nepal, Pakistan, Sri Lanka.

== Editions ==
Year	Games	Host city	Country	Logo	Mascot
1984	I	Kathmandu	Nepal		Ratto, A red panda
1985	II	Dhaka	Bangladesh		Mishuk, a doe
1987	III	Calcutta	India		Babu, the tiger
1989	IV	Islamabad	Pakistan		Sahara, a dancing horse
1991	V	Colombo	Sri Lanka		Jagga, an elephant
1993	VI	Dhaka	Bangladesh		Admia, the Bengal tiger
1995	VII	Madras	India		Madrasi, a lion holding a torch
1999	VIII	Kathmandu	Nepal		Him Kancha, a snow leopard
2004	IX	Islamabad	Pakistan		Bholu, a Himalayan brown bear & Sassi, a Indus dolphin
2006	X	Colombo	Sri Lanka		Wali kukula, a jungle fowl
2010	XI	Dhaka	Bangladesh		Kutumb, a doel
2016	XII	Guwahati and Shillong	India		Tikhor, a rhino
2019	XIII	Kathmandu and Pokhara	Nepal		Krishnasar, the Blackbuck antelope
2026	XIV	Lahore	Pakistan		TBA

== South Asian Beach Games ==
Year	Games	Host city	Country	Logo	Mascot
2011	I	Hambantota	Sri Lanka		Salu Paaliya, one of the 12 Palis

== South Asian Winter Games ==
Year	Games	Host city	Country	Logo	Mascot
2011	I	Dehradun and Auli	India		The bharal, the Himalayan blue-sheep
