= Fencing at the South Asian Games =

- Organiser: SAOC
- Host: South Asia
- Nations participating: 7

Fencing at the South Asian Games was first introduced during the 2019 South Asian Games held in Kathmandu, Nepal.

== Medal table ==
Rank	Nation	Gold	Silver	Bronze	Total
1	India (IND)	11	5	1	17
2	Bangladesh (BAN)	1	3	7	11
3	Nepal (NEP)	0	4	6	10
4	Sri Lanka (SRI)	0	0	8	8
5	Pakistan (PAK)	0	0	2	2
Totals (5 entries)		12	12	24	48

- As of the 2019 South Asian Games
