= Maldives at the South Asian Games =

- IOC code: MDV
- NOC: Maldives Olympic Committee
- Medals Ranked 8th: Gold 1 Silver 3 Bronze 13 Total 17

South Asian Games appearances (overview)
- 1984; 1985; 1987; 1989; 1991; 1993; 1995; 1999; 2004; 2006; 2010; 2016; 2019; 2025

Maldives has participated all 13 editions of South Asian Games governed by South Asia Olympic Council. Maldives never hosted a single South Asian Games so far. At 13th South Asian Games, Maldives claimed its first ever gold. With that achievement Maldives became the last country to win a gold medal at the South Asian Games.

== Performance ==
Maldives won its first medal in 1984 Kathmandu, it came in form of bronze.

For 6 South Asian Games, Maldives failed to win a single medal.

At 1991 Colombo, Maldives was runners up by getting defeated to Pakistan in Football event and won silver medal.

At 1995 Madras, 1999 Kathmandu and 2010 Dhaka, Maldives secured 1, 4 and 2 bronze medals respectively.

From 2016 South Asian Games, Maldives increased medal count significantly with 2 silver medals from athletics and 1 bronze medal from swimming.

2019 Kathmandu/Pokhara/Janakpur was a historic for Maldives. It was the best finish on medal tally with a total of 5 medals including 4 bronze medals along with the first ever gold medal clinched for the country which came from Hassan Saaid in 100m Athletics event.

== Medal table ==
Note: Yellow box around the year indicates the best performance of all time.

Games	Rank	Gold	Silver	Bronze	Total	Ref.
(Nepal) 1984 Kathmandu	7	0	0	1	1	
(Bangladesh) 1985 Dhaka	7	0	0	0	0	
(India) 1987 Calcutta	7	0	0	0	0	
(Pakistan) 1989 Islamabad	7	0	0	0	0	
(Sri Lanka) 1991 Colombo	6	0	1	0	1	
(Bangladesh) 1993 Dhaka	6	0	0	0	0	
(India) 1995 Madras	7	0	0	1	1	
(Nepal) 1999 Kathmandu	7	0	0	4	4	
(Pakistan) 2004 Islamabad	8	0	0	0	0	
(Sri Lanka) 2006 Colombo	8	0	0	0	0	
(Bangladesh) 2010 Dhaka	8	0	0	2	2	
(India) 2016 Guwahati & Shillong	7	0	2	1	3	
(Nepal) 2019 Kathmandu, Pokhara & Janakpur	6	1	0	4	5	
(Pakistan) 2025 Lahore	Future Event					
Total	8	1	3	13	17	
