= Sri Lanka at the South Asian Games =

- IOC code: SRI
- NOC: Sri Lanka Olympic Association
- Medals Ranked 3rd: Gold 250 Silver 436 Bronze 681 Total 1,367

South Asian Games appearances (overview)
- 1984; 1985; 1987; 1989; 1991; 1993; 1995; 1999; 2004; 2006; 2010; 2016; 2019; 2025

Sri Lanka is a member of the South Asian Zone of the Olympic Council of Asia (OCA) and has participated in the South Asian Games since the beginning of the game in 1984.

Sri Lanka has participated all 13 South Asian Games governed by South Asia Olympic Council.

Sri Lanka has performed quite good since 1984 Kathmandu. Sri Lanka has been second-ranked team 4 times, third-ranked team 7 times, fourth-ranked team 2 times.

At 2019 South Asian Games, Sri Lanka had finished highest total medals count 252 including 40 Gold Medals.

== Host Games ==
Sri Lanka has hosted South Asian Games 2 times : 1991 Colombo, 2006 Colombo

== Detailed Medal Count ==
Games	Host	Rank	(gold) Gold	(silver) Silver	(bronze) Bronze	Total
1984 Kathmandu	Nepal	2	7	11	19	37
1985 Dhaka	Bangladesh	4	2	7	9	18
1987 Calcutta	India	3	4	7	23	34
1989 Islamabad	Pakistan	3	6	10	21	37
1991 Colombo	Sri Lanka	2	44	34	40	118
1993 Dhaka	Bangladesh	3	20	22	39	81
1995 Madras	India	2	16	25	53	94
1999 Kathmandu	Nepal	3	16	42	62	120
2004 Islamabad	Pakistan	3	17	32	57	106
2006 Colombo	Sri Lanka	3	37	63	78	178
2010 Dhaka	Bangladesh	4	16	35	54	105
2016 Guwahati/Shillong	India	2	25	64	98	187
2019 Kathmandu/Pokhara/Janakpur	Nepal	3	40	84	128	252
2023 Lahore	Pakistan	Future Event				
Total			250	436	681	1367
