= Bhutan at the South Asian Games =

- IOC code: BHU
- NOC: Bhutan Olympic Committee
- Medals Ranked 7th: Gold 2 Silver 23 Bronze 66 Total 91

South Asian Games appearances (overview)
- 1984; 1985; 1987; 1989; 1991; 1993; 1995; 1999; 2004; 2006; 2010; 2016; 2019; 2025

Bhutan is a member of South Asian Zone of Olympic Council Of Asia and had participated in all 13 South Asian Games since beginning.

== Detailed Medal Table ==
Games	Host	Rank	(gold) Gold	(silver) Silver	(bronze) Bronze	Total
1984 Kathmandu	Nepal	6	0	0	2	2
1985 Dhaka	Bangladesh	6	0	0	4	4
1987 Calcutta	India	6	0	1	5	6
1989 Islamabad	Pakistan	6	0	0	3	3
1991 Colombo	Sri Lanka	7	0	0	0	0
1993 Dhaka	Bangladesh	6	0	0	0	0
1995 Madras	India	6	0	0	2	2
1999 Kathmandu	Nepal	6	1	6	7	14
2004 Islamabad	Pakistan	7	1	3	2	6
2006 Colombo	Sri Lanka	7	0	3	10	13
2010 Dhaka	Bangladesh	7	0	2	3	5
2016 Guwahati/Shillong	India	8	0	1	15	16
2019 Kathmandu/Pokhara/Janakpur	Nepal	8	0	7	13	20
2027 Pakistan	Pakistan	Future Event				
Total			2	23	66	91
