= Bangladesh at the South Asian Games =

- IOC code: BAN
- NOC: Bangladesh Olympic Association
- Medals Ranked 5th: Gold 86 Silver 210 Bronze 493 Total 789

South Asian Games appearances (overview)
- 1984; 1985; 1987; 1989; 1991; 1993; 1995; 1999; 2004; 2006; 2010; 2016; 2019; 2025

Bangladesh has participated all 13 South Asian Games governed by South Asia Olympic Council.

== Hosted Games ==
Dhaka, the capital of Bangladesh hosted the South Asian Games 3 times: 1985 South Asian Games, 1993 South Asian Games, 2010 South Asian Games.

== Detailed medal table ==
Games	Host	Rank	(gold) Gold	(silver) Silver	(bronze) Bronze	Total
1984 Kathmandu	Nepal	5	2	8	13	23
1985 Dhaka	Bangladesh	3	9	17	38	64
1987 Calcutta	India	4	3	20	31	54
1989 Islamabad	Pakistan	4	1	12	24	37
1991 Colombo	Sri Lanka	4	4	8	28	40
1993 Dhaka	Bangladesh	4	11	19	32	62
1995 Madras	India	4	7	17	34	58
1999 Kathmandu	Nepal	5	2	10	35	47
2004 Islamabad	Pakistan	5	3	13	24	40
2006 Colombo	Sri Lanka	6	3	15	34	52
2010 Dhaka	Bangladesh	3	18	23	56	97
2016 Guwahati/Shillong	India	5	4	16	55	75
2019 Kathmandu/Pokhara/Janakpur	Nepal	5	19	32	89	140
2025 Lahore	Pakistan	Future Event				
Total			86	210	493	789
