= Nepal at the South Asian Games =

- IOC code: NEP
- NOC: Nepal Olympic Committee
- Medals Ranked 4th: Gold 124 Silver 186 Bronze 380 Total 690

South Asian Games appearances (overview)
- 1984; 1985; 1987; 1989; 1991; 1993; 1995; 1999; 2004; 2006; 2010; 2016; 2019; 2025

Nepal has participated all 13 South Asian Games governed by South Asia Olympic Council.

Nepal has been 2nd-ranked 2 times. Best performance by Nepal was in 2019 South Asian Games where they finished the medal tally 2nd with highest ever total medal counts of 207 including 51 gold medals.

== Host games ==
Nepal has hosted South Asian Games three times : 1984 Kathmandu, 1999 Kathmandu, 2019 Kathmandu/Pokhara/Janakpur.

== Detailed medal count ==
Games	Host	Rank	(gold) Gold	(silver) Silver	(bronze) Bronze	Total
1984 Kathmandu	Nepal	4	4	12	8	24
1985 Dhaka	Bangladesh	5	1	9	22	32
1987 Calcutta	India	5	2	7	33	42
1989 Islamabad	Pakistan	4	1	13	32	46
1991 Colombo	Sri Lanka	5	2	8	29	39
1993 Dhaka	Bangladesh	5	1	6	15	22
1995 Madras	India	5	4	8	16	28
1999 Kathmandu	Nepal	2	31	10	24	65
2004 Islamabad	Pakistan	4	7	6	20	33
2006 Colombo	Sri Lanka	4	9	15	31	55
2010 Dhaka	Bangladesh	5	8	9	19	36
2016 Guwahati/Shillong	India	6	3	23	35	61
2019 Kathmandu/Pokhara/Janakpur	Nepal	2	51	60	96	207
2023 Lahore	Pakistan	Future Event				
Total			124	186	380	690
