= Alpine skiing at the 2011 South Asian Winter Games =

Alpine skiing event

Alpine skiing at the 2011 South Asian Winter Games will be held at Auli, India. The four events will be held between January 14 and 15, 2011.

== Men's events ==
Event	Gold		Silver		Bronze	
Giant slalom	Arif Khan; India	2:21:60	Mir Nawaz; Pakistan	2:21:74	Santosh Kumar; India	2:21:75
Slalom	Arif Khan; India		Jamyang Namgial; India		Mir Nawaz; Pakistan	

== Women's events ==
Event	Gold	Silver	Bronze
Giant slalom	Ifrah Wali; Pakistan	Amina Wali; Pakistan	Unknown; India
Slalom	Preeti Dimri; India	Amina Wali; Pakistan	Vandana Devi; India
