= Pakistan at the 2011 South Asian Winter Games =

Pakistan competed in the first ever South Asian Winter Games held in Dehradun and Auli, India, from 10 to 16 January 2011. It sent a contingent of 27 officials and athletes. It participated in slalom, giant slalom, cross-country skiing, and biathlon events.

== Medals table ==
| Medal | Name | Sport | Discipline | Date |
|---|---|---|---|---|
| Gold | Ifrah Wali | Alpine skiing | Giant slalom (women) | |
| Silver | Amina Wali | Alpine skiing | Giant slalom (women) | |
| Silver | Amina Wali | Alpine skiing | Slalom (women) | |
| Silver | Mir Nawaz | Alpine skiing | Slalom (men) | |
| Bronze | Mir Nawaz | Alpine skiing | Giant slalom (men) | |

== Alpine skiing ==
- Ifrah Wali
- Amina Wali
- Mir Nawaz
- Muhammad Abbas
