= Jamyang Namgial =

Indian alpine skier (born 1985)

Personal information
- Born: 3 June 1985 (age 41) Leh, Jammu and Kashmir, India (now in Ladakh)

Skiing career
- Sport: Alpine skiing
- Disciplines: Giant slalom

Olympics
- Teams: 1 – (2010)
- Medals: 0

World Championships
- Teams: 1 – (2009)
- Medals: 0
Medal record
Men's Alpine skiing
Representing India
South Asian Winter Games
Silver medal – second place	2011 Dehradun and Auli	Slalom

Jamyang Namgial (born 3 June 1985) is an Indian skier. Namgial participated in his first Olympic event at the 2010 Winter Olympics, competing in the men's giant slalom event of Alpine skiing. He also participated in the 2007 Asian Winter Games.

Namgial served in the Ladakh Scouts regiment of the Indian Army.

== Alpine skiing results ==
All results are sourced from the International Ski Federation (FIS).

=== Olympic results ===
Year
Year	Age	Slalom	Giant; Slalom	Super-G	Downhill	Combined	Team Event
2010	24	—	81	—	—	—	—

=== World Championship results ===
Year	Age	Slalom	Giant slalom	Super-G	Downhill	Combined
2015	23	BDNF1	82	—	—	—

== See also ==
- Alpine skiing at the 2010 Winter Olympics
- 2007 Asian Winter Games
