= India at the South Asian Games =

- IOC code: IND
- NOC: Indian Olympic Association
- Medals Ranked 1st: Gold 1,263 Silver 736 Bronze 379 Total 2,378

South Asian Games appearances (overview)
- 1984; 1985; 1987; 1989; 1991; 1993; 1995; 1999; 2004; 2006; 2010; 2016; 2019; 2025

India has participated in every edition of the South Asian Games. The country has been the best performer and the table topper back-to-back at every single Games.

== Hosting history ==
India has hosted the South Asian Games three times. The 1987 edition in Calcutta was the first time the nation hosted the Games. The next hosted SAG was the 1995 edition hosted in Madras. This was followed by the 2016 edition in Guwahati and Shillong.

== Medal table ==
Games	Host	Rank	(gold) Gold	(silver) Silver	(bronze) Bronze	Total
1984 Kathmandu	Nepal	1	44	28	16	88
1985 Dhaka	Bangladesh	1	61	32	14	107
1987 Calcutta	India	1	91	45	19	155
1989 Islamabad	Pakistan	1	61	43	20	124
1991 Colombo	Sri Lanka	1	64	59	41	164
1993 Dhaka	Bangladesh	1	60	46	31	137
1995 Madras	India	1	106	60	19	185
1999 Kathmandu	Nepal	1	102	58	37	197
2004 Islamabad	Pakistan	1	103	57	32	192
2006 Colombo	Sri Lanka	1	118	69	47	234
2010 Dhaka	Bangladesh	1	90	55	30	175
2016 Guwahati–Shillong	India	1	188	92	28	308
2019 Kathmandu–Pokhara	Nepal	1	175	92	45	312
2027 Lahore	Pakistan	Upcoming event				
Total		1	1263	736	379	2378

== See also ==
- Sport in India
- India at the Olympics
- India at the Deaflympics
- India at the Paralympics
- India at the World Games
- India at the Asian Games
- India at the Asian Para Games
- India at the Commonwealth Games
- India at the Lusofonia Games
- India at the Youth Olympics
- India at the Asian Youth Games
