= Nepal at the 1984 South Asian Games =

National participation - South Asian Games

- IOC code: NEP
- NOC: Nepal Olympic Committee
- Website: https://www.nocnepal.org.np/

in Kathmandu, Nepal 17 to 23 September 1984
- Competitors: 105 in 5 sports
- Medals Ranked 4th: Gold 4 Silver 12 Bronze 8 Total 24

South Asian Games appearances (overview)
- 1984; 1985; 1987; 1989; 1991; 1993; 1995; 1999; 2004; 2006; 2010; 2016; 2019; 2025

Nepal participated in the first edition of SAG, 1984 South Asian Games at Dasarath Stadium, Kathmandu, Nepal from 17 to 23 September 1984. A total of 105 competitors representing Nepal, participated in the first South Asian Games, which Nepal hosted. It finished fourth in the medal tally with 24 medals, including 4 golds, 12 silvers and 8 bronzes.

== Medalists ==
Ashok Kumar Karki was a double medalist from Nepal in two weightlifting events. Medalists representing Nepal are as follows:

| Medal | Name | Sport |
|---|---|---|
| Gold | Baikuntha Manandhar | Athletics |
| Gold | Dal Bahadur Rana Magar | Boxing |
| Gold | Pushkar Dhoj Sahi | Boxing |
| Gold | Nepal national football team | Football |
| Silver | Arjun Pandit | Athletics |
| Silver | Amiri Yadav | Athletics |
| Silver | Prakash Tuladhar | Boxing |
| Silver | Prabin Tuladhar | Boxing |
| Silver | Uttam Shrestha | Boxing |
| Silver | Man Bahadur Shrestha | Boxing |
| Silver | Ram Awale | Boxing |
| Silver | Jagadish Pradhan | Weightlifting |
| Silver | Ashok Karki | Weightlifting |
| Silver | Ashok Karki | Weightlifting |
| Silver | Surendra Hamal | Weightlifting |
| Silver | Sunil Joshi | Weightlifting |
| Bronze | Jodha Gurung | Athletics |
| Bronze | Umesh Maskey | Boxing |
| Bronze | Jyoti Paudel | Weightlifting |
| Bronze | Shiv Bhakti | Weightlifting |
| Bronze | Sumsuddin Siddiki | Weightlifting |
| Bronze | Amrit Chirtrkar; Tulsi Gurung; Jaya Gurung; Rajman Tuladhar | Swimming (4 X 100 m Relay Free Style Men's) |
| Bronze | Ishwor Karki; Rajman Tuladhar; Shyam Gurung; Ongden Lama | Swimming (Middle Relay Men's) |
| Bronze | Sharada Lepcha; Archana Thapa; Indira Chambling; Neelam Tuladhar | Swimming (4 X 100 m Relay Free Style Women's) |

== Medals by Sports ==
Performance
| Games | Gold | Silver | Bronze | Total |
|---|---|---|---|---|
| Athletics | 1 | 2 | 1 | 4 |
| Boxing | 2 | 5 | 1 | 8 |
| Football | 1 | - | - | 1 |
| Swimming | - | - | 3 | 3 |
| Weightlifting | - | 5 | 3 | 8 |
| Total | 4 | 12 | 8 | 24 |

== See also ==
- Nepal at the South Asian Games
