= Bangladesh International =

Badminton championships

- Sport: Badminton
- Founded: 2002
- Organizing body: Bangladesh Badminton Federation
- Country: Bangladesh

The Bangladesh International is an international badminton tournament held in Dhaka, Bangladesh and organized by the Bangladesh Badminton Federation. The tournament was established in June 2002 and was part of the Asian Satellite. In 2011, the tournament was graded as the BWF International Series with the total prize money equaling US$5,000 and later in 2013, it was upgraded to the International Challenge, providing a total prize money of US$15,000. In 2019, the tournament was dedicated to Bangladesh's "Father of the Nation," Sheikh Mujibur Rahman.

== Past winners ==
Year	Men's singles	Women's singles	Men's doubles	Women's doubles	Mixed doubles	Ref
2002	(India) Arvind Bhat	(Sri Lanka) Chandrika de Silva	(India) Jaseel P. Ismail (India) Jaison Xavier	(Bangladesh) Alina Begum (Bangladesh) Konika Rani Adhikary	(Bangladesh) Mohammed Jabed Mostafa (Bangladesh) Alina Begum	
2003– 2010	No competition					
2011	(Indonesia) Dharma Alrie Guna	(Sri Lanka) Achini Ratnasiri	(India) Tarun Kona (India) Arun Vishnu	(Sri Lanka) Achini Ratnasiri (Sri Lanka) Upuli Samanthika Weerasinghe	(Vietnam) Lê Hà Anh (Vietnam) Lê Thu Huyền	
2012	No competition					
2013	(Malaysia) Yogendran Khrishnan	(Chinese Taipei) Pai Hsiao-ma	(Chinese Taipei) Liang Jui-wei (Chinese Taipei) Liao Kuan-hao	(India) Prajakta Sawant (India) Arathi Sara Sunil	(Malaysia) Muhammad Adib Haiqal Nurizwan (Malaysia) Sannatasah Saniru	
2014	(Malaysia) Lim Chi Wing	(Turkey) Neslihan Yiğit	(Malaysia) Low Juan Shen (Malaysia) Ong Yew Sin	(India) Pradnya Gadre (India) N. Sikki Reddy	(Malaysia) Tan Chee Tean (Malaysia) Shevon Jemie Lai	
2015	(India) B. Sai Praneeth	(India) Ruthvika Gadde	(India) Pranaav Chopra (India) Akshay Dewalkar	(Thailand) Chayanit Chaladchalam (Thailand) Phataimas Muenwong	(Singapore) Terry Hee (Singapore) Tan Wei Han	
2016	(India) Abhishek Yeligar	(Vietnam) Vũ Thị Trang	(India) Satwiksairaj Rankireddy (India) Chirag Shetty	(Vietnam) Nguyễn Thị Sen (Vietnam) Vũ Thị Trang	(India) Satwiksairaj Rankireddy (India) K. Maneesha	
2017	No competition					
2018	(Malaysia) Soo Teck Zhi	(Vietnam) Nguyễn Thùy Linh	(Indonesia) Leo Rolly Carnando (Indonesia) Daniel Marthin	(Malaysia) Vivian Hoo (Malaysia) Yap Cheng Wen	(Indonesia) Leo Rolly Carnando (Indonesia) Indah Cahya Sari Jamil	
2019	(India) Lakshya Sen	(Vietnam) Nguyễn Thùy Linh	(Malaysia) Chang Yee Jun (Malaysia) Tee Kai Wun	(Malaysia) Pearly Tan (Malaysia) Thinaah Muralitharan	(Malaysia) Hoo Pang Ron (Malaysia) Cheah Yee See	
2020	Cancelled (Note: This tournament, originally to be played from 25 to 29 November, was later cancelled due to the COVID-19 pandemic in Bangladesh.)					
2021	(India) Abhishek Saini	(Indonesia) Putri Kusuma Wardani	(Sri Lanka) Sachin Dias (Sri Lanka) Buwaneka Goonethilleka	(India) Mehreen Riza (India) Arathi Sara Sunil	(Sri Lanka) Sachin Dias (Sri Lanka) Kavidi Sirimannage	
2022	(India) Mithun Manjunath	(India) Aakarshi Kashyap	(Thailand) Pharanyu Kaosamaang (Thailand) Worrapol Thongsa-nga	(Thailand) Laksika Kanlaha (Thailand) Phataimas Muenwong	(Malaysia) Chen Tang Jie (Malaysia) Toh Ee Wei	
2023	Cancelled (Note: This tournament, originally to be played on 6–10 December, was later cancelled.)					
2024	(Sri Lanka) Viren Nettasinghe	(Ukraine) Polina Buhrova	(Malaysia) Lau Yi Sheng (Malaysia) Lee Yi Bo	(Thailand) Kodchaporn Chaichana (Thailand) Pannawee Polyiam	(Singapore) Terry Hee (Singapore) Jin Yujia	
2025 I	(India) Meiraba Maisnam	(United States) Ishika Jaiswal	(India) Niranjaan Nandakumar (India) Ruban Kumar	(Thailand) Phattharin Aiamvareesrisakul (Thailand) Sarisa Janpeng	(Malaysia) Datu Anif Isaac Datu Asrah (Malaysia) Clarissa San	
2025 II	(Kazakhstan) Dmitriy Panarin	(India) Tanvi Reddy Andluri	(Bangladesh) Gourab Singha (Bangladesh) Abdul Jahir Tanvir	(Thailand) Thitiwarada Buakaew (Thailand) Sarisa Janpeng	(Malaysia) Datu Anif Isaac Datu Asrah (Malaysia) Clarissa San	
2026 I						
2026 II						

== Performances by nation ==
As of the finals of the 2025 II edition

Pos	Nation	MS	WS	MD	WD	XD	Total
1	India	7	3	5	3	1	19
2	Malaysia	3	0	3	2	6	14
3	Sri Lanka	1	2	1	1	1	6
3	Thailand	0	0	1	5	0	6
5	Vietnam	0	3	0	1	1	5
6	Indonesia	1	1	1	0	1	4
7	Bangladesh	0	0	1	1	1	3
8	Chinese Taipei	0	1	1	0	0	2
8	Singapore	0	0	0	0	2	2
10	Kazakhstan	1	0	0	0	0	1
10	Turkey	0	1	0	0	0	1
10	Ukraine	0	1	0	0	0	1
10	United States	0	1	0	0	0	1
Total		13	13	13	13	13	65
