= Peshawar Golf Club =

Coordinates: 34°01′12.2″N 71°33′43.4″E

- Interactive map of Peshawar Golf Club
- Type: Golf Course
- Location: Peshawar, Khyber Pakhtunkhwa, Pakistan
- Area: Peshawar Pakistan
- Operator: Pakistan Air Force
- Open: All year

Peshawar Golf Club also called PAF Golf Course is a golf course located in Peshawar, the capital of Khyber Pakhtunkhwa province of Pakistan. It is located on Grand Trunk (GT) Road, adjacent to Pearl Continental Hotel and Radio Pakistan, Peshawar.

== Overview and history ==
The Peshawar Golf Club is a large golf course in Peshawar, Khyber Pakhtunkhwa, Islamic Republic of Pakistan. It is located in the main city centre area, bounded by the Shami Road and Grand Trunk Road. Built during the colonial days of British Raj by officers of the British garrison, the golf course is now operated by the Pakistan Air Force. The total area is 5,573 m^{2} (59,990 sq ft) and has a total of 18 holes and is part of the Frontier Golf Association. The course is frequented by elite members.

The golf course is situated close to a number of notable city landmarks, including the Bala Hissar Fort and the Khyber Pass. The Peshawar International Airport and Lady Reading Hospital are also nearby, while the five-star Pearl Continental Hotel, local WAPDA headquarters, Army Stadium and the Veterinary Research Institute and Hospital are all adjacent. Across the golf complex is the Provincial Assembly of Khyber Pakhtunkhwa and the Peshawar High Court.

== See also ==
- Qayyum Stadium
- Hayatabad Sports Complex
- Peshawar
