= Mir Nawaz =

Pakistani alpine skier

Medal record

Men's Alpine skiing

Representing Pakistan

South Asian Winter Games
Silver medal – second place	2011 Dehradun and Auli	Slalom
Bronze medal – third place	2011 Dehradun and Auli	Giant slalom

Mir Nawaz is a Pakistani alpine skier. His bronze medal in Giant slalom skiing at the 2011 South Asian Winter Games was Pakistan's first ever medal at any South Asian Winter Games.

== Career ==
Nawaz won two medals at the 2011 South Asian Winter Games held in India from 10–16 January 2011. He won a bronze in Giant slalom with a time of 2 minutes and 21.75 seconds and a silver in Slalom.

In 2013, he qualified for the slalom in the 2014 Winter Olympics held in Sochi, Russia.

In 2017, he was named to Pakistan's Asian Winter Games team.
