= Ifrah Wali =

Pakistani alpine skier (born 1995)

Medal record

Women's Alpine skiing

Representing Pakistan

South Asian Winter Games
Gold medal – first place	2011 Dehradun and Auli	Giant Slalom

Ifrah Wali (born November 29, 1995) is a Pakistani alpine skier. She made history by becoming the first winner of the Giant Slalom event at any South Asian Winter Games when she won at the inaugural games held in India. In recognition of her exceptional contributions, she was honored with the President's Pride of Performance in 2023, the highest civil award in the sports category.

== Family and background ==
Wali belongs to Ghahkoch Valley in District Ghizar, Gilgit-Baltistan. Ifrah Wali, the progeny of the Gushpur family, the former royal family of the Punial Valley district Ghizer, excelled in skiing mainly because she spent most of her childhood growing up in Rattu – a snow-capped area of Astore Valley where her father, Col. Amjad Wali, was posted in the army for nearly 11 years.

Wali completed her high school education from Army Public School, Gilgit and later graduated from Nust Business School in 2017.

== Career ==
In 2011, Wali won the Giant Slalom event at the South Asian Games in India by beating her sister, Amina and an Indian competitor to the podium.

Ifrah Wali was selected by the Pakistan Ski Federation (SFP) to train in Hintertux, Austria in FIS skiing camp for one month in Nov 2014. While training Ms. Wali met with an accident and broke the tibia and fibula of her right leg. SFP spoke person said regarding her injury, "Ifrah met the tragedy while doing training as she slipped from a slope of Hintertux glacier [in Austria], from where she was airlifted to a hospital. She is being treated at the hospital where the doctors have advised her six-week bed rest."

Wali received one gold and two bronze in Karakoram International Ski Cup 2017, Pakistan's first international skiing championship. A total of 9 countries participated in this event with participants flying in from Turkey, Ukraine, Morocco, Afghanistan, India, Tajikistan, Slovakia, Sri Lanka, and Iran.

In January 2017, Wali was named to Pakistan's 2017 Asian Winter Games team. Ifrah Wali, along with a contingent of 20 members represented Pakistan in the Asian Winter Games, Sapporo 2017. Ms. Wali received 23rd position in Giant Slalom and 25th position in Slalom.
