= Bangladesh at the 2011 South Asian Winter Games =

Flag of Bangladesh

Bangladesh competed in the first ever South Asian Winter Games in Dehradun and Auli, India. Bangladesh sent 2 athletes, and will compete in a winter sport competition for the first time. Bangladesh also sent one official.

== Speed skating ==
Men

- Imran Hossain Emon
- Smith Savio Gomez
