= Sri Lanka at the 2011 South Asian Winter Games =

Sri Lanka competed in the first ever South Asian Winter Games held in Dehradun and Auli, India from 10 January to 16 January 2011. It sent only one athlete, Anita Rollin, who won gold in snow boarding.

== Medals table ==
Medal	Name	Sport	Date
Gold	Anita Rollin	Snow Boarding	
