= Afghanistan at the South Asian Games =

- IOC code: AFG
- NOC: Afghanistan National Olympic Committee
- Medals Ranked 6th: Gold 21 Silver 28 Bronze 79 Total 128

South Asian Games appearances (overview)
- 2004; 2006; 2010; 2016

Afghanistan has participated only 4 South Asian Games out of 13 governed by South Asia Olympic Council.

Afghanistan started participating from 2004 South Asian Games but pulled out after 2016 South Asian Games.

== Detailed medal table ==
| Games | Host | Rank | (gold) Gold | (silver) Silver | (bronze) Bronze | Total |
|---|---|---|---|---|---|---|
| 2004 Islamabad | Pakistan | 6 | 1 | 3 | 28 | 32 |
| 2006 Colombo | Sri Lanka | 5 | 6 | 7 | 16 | 29 |
| 2010 Dhaka | Bangladesh | 6 | 7 | 9 | 16 | 32 |
| 2016 Guwahati/Shillong | India | 4 | 7 | 9 | 19 | 35 |
| Total | | | 21 | 28 | 79 | 128 |
