= Amina Wali =

Pakistani alpine skier

Medal record

Women's Alpine skiing

Representing Pakistan

South Asian Winter Games
Silver medal – second place	2011 Dehradun and Auli	Giant Slalom
Silver medal – second place	2011 Dehradun and Auli	Slalom

Amina Wali is a Pakistani alpine skier and a recipient of the Pride of Performance award. She remained Pakistan national champion for 15 years. In acknowledgement of her extraordinary achievements in sports, she was conferred Presidential Award of Pride of Performance in 2023. She is nominated as goodwill ambassador to Plan International organization for supporting its campaign "because I am a girl".

== Family and background ==
Amina Wali belongs to the former royal family of Punial, Ghizer. She is daughter of ski instructor and mountaineer Col (R) Raja Amjad Wali. She was born in 1993 in Abbottabad.

She started skiing at the age of 4. She is the first woman (along with her sister Ifrah Wali) to win an international medal in skiing for Pakistan. She remained national skiing champion for 15 years.

She hails from Ghizer district of Gilgit-Baltistan. She has been awarded with National High Achiever Award.

She is married and has three children. She is presently working with UNICEF as an environmentalist / Inclusion expert. She is a gold medalist of BS and M Phill Environmental Sciences.

== Career ==
=== 1997 ===
Amina learned to ski in a remote area of Rattu, Astore District of Gilgit-Baltistan. Since then she is indulged with the sport, primarily for fun and then as a semi-profession.

=== 2004 ===
In 2004, she appeared in National Skiing Championship known as 'Saadia Khan National Ski Cup' for the first time.

=== 2005–2015 ===
In 2005 Amina grabbed her first gold medal in giant slalom and a bronze medal in slalom of the National Ski Championship held at Malam Jabba of Khyber Pakhtunkhwa. Since then she is winning medals in the National Championships.

=== 2011 ===
Wali placed second in both giant slalom and slalom events at the 2011 South Asian Winter Games held in India from 10 to 16 January 2011.

=== 2013 ===
Wali competed in the International Ski Federation (FIS) races in Erzurum. She finished 16th in the Slalom event and eliminated her chance to compete at Sochi Olympics.
