= Peshawar Sports Complex =

Sport complex in Peshawar, Pakistan

- Location: Peshawar Cantonment, Peshawar, Pakistan
- Owner: Government of Khyber Pakhtunkhwa
- Operator: Directorate General of Sports Khyber Pakhtunkhwa

The Peshawar Sports Complex, also called the Qayyum Sports Complex, is a multi-sport complex in Peshawar, Khyber Pakhtunkhwa, Pakistan. Its principal outdoor venue is Qayyum Stadium, a multi-purpose stadium. The wider complex includes facilities for football, athletics, badminton, squash and combat sports. It is the biggest sports complex in Khyber Pakhtunkhwa.

== History ==
Plans for a major public stadium in Peshawar were developed during the provincial government of Abdul Qayyum Khan. At a meeting of the Olympic Stadium Committee on 19 January 1952, committee members proposed that the facility be named Qayyum Stadium. The proposal was adopted despite Qayyum Khan's objection to the use of his name.

In the 1980s, the Peshawar Stadium was transferred to Pakistan Sports Board, and work was initiated to convert in into a standard sports complex including a Gymnasium Hall, Mini Hall, Squash Courts, and Sportsmen Hostel. The scheme was approved in 1983, the construction work was initiated in 1985 and completed in 1990.

The provincial government launched renovation and beautification work at Peshawar Sports Complex in 2016. Later projects included redevelopment of the main football ground and construction of the Qamar Zaman Squash Complex.

== Facilities ==
- Qayyum Stadium
- Lala Ayub Hockey Stadium
- Lala Rafique Sports Arena
- Wadood Hall
- Qamar Zaman Squash Complex
- Adil Khan Swimming Pool
- Badminton and martial-arts gymnasium
- Multi-sport pavilion and indoor halls

== Events ==
Peshawar Sports Complex has hosted major provincial multi-sport meetings and has been a central venue for the National Games. It is one of the hosts for the 2027 South Asian Games.

== See also ==
- Hayatabad Sports Complex
- Arbab Niaz Stadium
- List of stadiums in Pakistan
