= Bilal Mehsud =

Pakistani boxer

Muhammad Bilal Mehsud
Personal information
- Nickname: Mehsud
- Nationality: Pakistani
- Born: 7 September 1995 (age 31) South Waziristan, Pakistan
- Weight: Lightweight & Super lightweight Champion

Boxing career
- Stance: Orthodox

Boxing record
- Total fights: 18
- Wins: 13
- Win by KO: 11
- Losses: 4
- Draws: 1

Muhammad Bilal Mehsud (born 7 September 1995) is a Pakistani professional boxer who is currently the Pakistan Lightweight And Super Lightweight champion.

== Early life ==
Bilal Mehsud was born on 7 September 1995 in South Waziristan, Pakistan.

== Professional boxing ==
=== Early career ===
On 30 November 2017, Bilal made his debut against Muhammad Shakir Mehmood Khan which Bilal won by knockout. In his second match, Bilal defeated Naseem Khan by knockout, then Iftikhar Ahmad. Asad Ullah and Amin Ul Haq were also defeated by Bilal Mehsud.

=== First international opponent ===
On 20 July 2019, the Pakistan super lightweight champion Bilal Mehsud faced the WBC Asia Silver Super Light Champion Giesler AP. Their match ended in a tie. However Bilal said that he knocked out Giesler twice in the fifth and sixth rounds and this was an unfair match. He wrote a letter to WBC for a rematch.

=== 2020 fights ===
On 9 February 2020, Bilal faced Hujjatullah Zulfiqar and emerged victorious. On 3 October 2020, Bilal had a rematch with Afghani boxer Amin Ul Haq, once again defeating him. Later that month, on 31 October 2020, Bilal defeated Haroon Khan by technical knockout.

==== First defeat ====
On 19 December 2020, Bilal Mehsud lost to Manzoor Shujat by decision. However, Mehsud claimed the match was unfair and provided video footage as evidence.

== Professional boxing record ==
10 fights	8 wins	1 loss
By knockout	6	0
By decision	2	1
Draws	1	

No.	Result	Record	Opponent	Type	Date	Location	Notes
10	Loss	8–1–1	(England) Manzoor Shujat	UD	19 Dec 2020	Governor House Punjab, Lahore, Pakistan	
9	Win	8-0–1	(Afghanistan) Amin Ul Haq	TKO	3 Oct 2020	Islamabad, Pakistan	
8	Win	7–0–1	(Afghanistan) Hujjatullah Zulfiqar	UD	9 Feb 2020	Qayyum Stadium, Peshawar, Pakistan	
7	Draw	6–0–1	(Indonesia) Giesler AP	TD	20 Jul 2019	(Indonesia) Waringin Sports Hall, Jayapura, Pakistan	For WBC Asia Silver Super Light title
6	Win	5–0	(Pakistan) Muhammad Asim	TKO	12 Apr 2019	Hamed Marque, Rawalpindi, Pakistan	
5	Win	5–0	(Afghanistan) Amin Ul Haq	TKO	16 Dec 2018	Cultus Ground, Haripur, Pakistan	
4	Win	4–0	(Pakistan) Asad Ullah	UD	27 Nov 2018	Kacha Khuh, Khanewal, Pakistan	
3	Win	3–0	(Afghanistan) Iftikhar Ahmad	TKO	18 Aug 2018	Qayyum Stadium, Peshawar, Pakistan	
2	Win	2–0	(Pakistan) Nazeem Khan	KO	10 Jun 2018	Islamabad, Pakistan	
1	Win	1–0	(Pakistan) Shakir Mehmood	KO	30 Nov 2017	Islamabad, Pakistan	Won Pakistan Super Light title
