= Badminton at the 2010 South Asian Games =

- Venue: Wooden-Floor Gymnasium
- Dates: 30 January–4 February

Badminton at the 2010 South Asian Games was held in Wooden-Floor Gymnasium in Dhaka, Bangladesh between 30 January and 4 February 2010. The badminton programme in 2010 included men's and women's singles competitions; men's, women's and mixed doubles competitions alongside men's and women's team events.

== Medal summary ==
=== Medal table ===
* Host nation (Bangladesh)

Rank	Nation	Gold	Silver	Bronze	Total
1	India (IND)	7	5	0	12
2	Sri Lanka (SRI)	0	2	6	8
3	Bangladesh (BAN)*	0	0	3	3
3	Pakistan (PAK)	0	0	3	3
5	Nepal (NEP)	0	0	2	2
Totals (5 entries)		7	7	14	28

=== Medalists ===
The following players who won medals at the Games.

Event	Gold	Silver	Bronze
Men's singles	Chetan Anand; India	R. M. V. Gurusaidutt; India	Dinuka Karunaratne; Sri Lanka
Men's singles	Chetan Anand; India	R. M. V. Gurusaidutt; India	Ahsan Qamar; Pakistan
Women's singles	Sayali Gokhale; India	Trupti Murgunde; India	Palwasha Bashir; Pakistan
Women's singles	Sayali Gokhale; India	Trupti Murgunde; India	Thilini Jayasinghe; Sri Lanka
Men's doubles	India (IND); Rupesh Kumar K. T. Sanave Thomas	India (IND); Chetan Anand; Valiyaveetil Diju	Sri Lanka (SRI); Rajitha Dhanayaka; Hasitha Chanaka
Men's doubles	India (IND); Rupesh Kumar K. T. Sanave Thomas	India (IND); Chetan Anand; Valiyaveetil Diju	Pakistan (PAK); Rizwan Azam; Sulehri Kashif Ali
Women's doubles	India (IND); Aparna Balan; Shruti Kurien	India (IND); P. C. Thulasi; Ashwini Ponnappa	Sri Lanka (SRI); Renu Hettiarachchige; Nadeesha Gayanthi
Women's doubles	India (IND); Aparna Balan; Shruti Kurien	India (IND); P. C. Thulasi; Ashwini Ponnappa	Sri Lanka (SRI); Achini Ratnasiri; Upuli Weerasinghe
Mixed doubles	India (IND); Valiyaveetil Diju; Ashwini Ponnappa	India (IND); Sanave Thomas; Aparna Balan	Bangladesh (BAN); Rasel Kabir Sumon; Shapla Aktar
Mixed doubles	India (IND); Valiyaveetil Diju; Ashwini Ponnappa	India (IND); Sanave Thomas; Aparna Balan	Sri Lanka (SRI); Niluka Karunaratne; Renu Hettiarachchige
Men's team	India (IND); Chetan Anand; Valiyaveetil Diju; R. M. V. Gurusaidutt; Rupesh Kumar K. T. Aditya Prakash; Sanave Thomas	Sri Lanka (SRI); Hasitha Chanaka; Rajitha Dhanayaka; Nuwan Hettiarachchi; Dinuka Karunaratne; Diluka Karunaratne; Niluka Karunaratne	Bangladesh (BAN); Jamil Ahmed Dulal; Mohammad Anamul Haque; Ahsan Habib Parash; Rasel Kabir Sumon; Md. Rais Uddin; Saif Uddin
Men's team	India (IND); Chetan Anand; Valiyaveetil Diju; R. M. V. Gurusaidutt; Rupesh Kumar K. T. Aditya Prakash; Sanave Thomas	Sri Lanka (SRI); Hasitha Chanaka; Rajitha Dhanayaka; Nuwan Hettiarachchi; Dinuka Karunaratne; Diluka Karunaratne; Niluka Karunaratne	Nepal (NEP); Sahadev Khadka; Bishal Pradhan; Kishor Rana; Bikash Shrestha; Ratnajit Tamang; Sajan Krishna Tamrakar
Women's team	India (IND); Aparna Balan; Sayali Gokhale; Shruti Kurien; Trupti Murgunde; Ashwini Ponnappa; P. C. Thulasi	Sri Lanka (SRI); Nadeesha Gayanthi; Renu Hettiarachchige; Thilini Jayasinghe; Achini Ratnasiri; Lekha Shehani; Upuli Weerasinghe	Bangladesh (BAN); Konika Rani Adhikary; Rozina Akter; Shapla Akter; Dulali Hulder; Jebunnesa Seema; Alina Sultana
Women's team	India (IND); Aparna Balan; Sayali Gokhale; Shruti Kurien; Trupti Murgunde; Ashwini Ponnappa; P. C. Thulasi	Sri Lanka (SRI); Nadeesha Gayanthi; Renu Hettiarachchige; Thilini Jayasinghe; Achini Ratnasiri; Lekha Shehani; Upuli Weerasinghe	Nepal (NEP); Punam Gurung; Sabina Panthi; Pooja Shrestha; Sujana Shrestha; Nangsal Tamang; Sara Devi Tamang

== Results ==
=== Men's singles ===
Semifinal
(India) Chetan Anand	21	21
(Sri Lanka) Dinuka Karunaratne	15	5
(Pakistan) Ahsan Qamar	15	11
(India) Gurusai Dutt	21	21

Final
(India) Chetan Anand	21	21
(India) Gurusai Dutt	16	8

=== Women's singles ===
Semifinal
(India) Sayali Gokhale	21	21
(Pakistan) Palwasha Bashir	8	3
(Sri Lanka) Thilini Jayasinghe	10	18
(India) Trupti Murgunde	21	21

Final
(India) Sayali Gokhale	21	8
(India) Trupti Murgunde	16	3^{r}

=== Men's doubles ===
Semi-finals
(India) Rupesh Kumar K. T. (India) Sanave Thomas	21	21
(Pakistan) Rizwan Azam (Pakistan) Kashif Sulehri	14	13
(Sri Lanka) Rajitha Dahanayaka (Sri Lanka) Hasitha Chanaka	12	11
(India) Chetan Anand (India) Valiyaveetil Diju	21	21

Final
(India) Rupesh Kumar K. T. (India) Sanave Thomas	21
(India) Chetan Anand (India) Valiyaveetil Diju	19^{r}

=== Women's doubles ===
Semi-finals
(India) Aparna Balan (India) Shruti Kurien	21	21
(Sri Lanka) Achini Ratnasiri (Sri Lanka) Upuli Samanthika	7	8
(Sri Lanka) Chandrika de Silva (Sri Lanka) Nadeesha Gayanthi	8	13
(India) P. C. Thulasi (India) Ashwini Ponnappa	21	21

Final
(India) Aparna Balan (India) Shruti Kurien	21	22
(India) P. C. Thulasi (India) Ashwini Ponnappa	19	20

=== Mixed doubles ===
Semi-finals
(India) Valiyaveetil Diju (India) Ashwini Ponnappa	21	21
(Bangladesh) Rasel Kabir (Bangladesh) Shapla Aktar	14	6
(Sri Lanka) Niluka Karunaratne (Sri Lanka) Chandrika de Silva	14	13
(India) Sanave Thomas (India) Aparna Balan	21	21

Final
(India) Valiyaveetil Diju (India) Ashwini Ponnappa	21	21
(India) Sanave Thomas (India) Aparna Balan	11	15
