= 2011 Asian Games =

2011 Asian Games may refer to:

- 2011 Asian Winter Games in Kazakhstan
- 2011 SEA Games, also known as the 2011 Southeast Asian Games
- 2011 South Asian Beach Games
