= Bangladesh national beach soccer team =

Men's association football team representing Bangladesh

Bangladesh
- Nickname(s): Bengal Tigers, Red and Green
- Association: Bangladesh Football Federation (BFF)
- Confederation: Asian Football Confederation (AFC)
First colours
Second colours

First international
- Maldives 3–8 Bangladesh (Hambantota, Sri Lanka; 8 October 2011)

Biggest win
- Maldives 9–10 Bangladesh (Hambantota, Sri Lanka; 10 October 2011)

Biggest defeat
- Sri Lanka 12–4 Bangladesh (Hambantota, Sri Lanka; 9 October 2011)

World Cup
- Appearances: 0

AFC Beach Soccer Asian Cup
- Appearances: 0

South Asian Beach Games
- Appearances: 1 (first in 2011)
- Best result: Champion (2011)
Medal record
Men's Beach Soccer
Representing Bangladesh
2011 South Asian Beach Games
Gold medal – first place	2011 Hambantota	Results

The Bangladesh national beach soccer team represents Bangladesh in international beach soccer competitions and is controlled by the Bangladesh Football Federation (BFF), the governing body for football in Bangladesh.

== History ==
Bangladesh national beach soccer team have participated in the inaugural season of 2011 South Asian Beach Games which was played in Hambantota, Sri Lanka and they have crowned they trophy by beating Sri Lanka 10–9 goals on 10 October 2011.

=== 2011 ===
October 8	Bangladesh	8–3	Maldives	Hambantota, Sri Lanka
9:00		Report

October 9	Bangladesh	4–12	Sri Lanka	Hambantota, Sri Lanka
8:00		Report

October 9	Bangladesh	5–1	Nepal	Hambantota, Sri Lanka
16:00		Report

==== Final match ====
October 10	Bangladesh	10–9	Sri Lanka	Hambantota, Sri Lanka
16:00		Report

== Tournament history ==
=== FIFA Beach Soccer World Cup ===
FIFA Beach Soccer World Cup record
Year	Round	Position	GP	W	L	T	NR
(Brazil) 1995	Did not qualify						
(Brazil) 1996	Did not qualify						
(Brazil) 1997	Did not qualify						
(Brazil) 1998	Did not qualify						
(Brazil) 1999	Did not qualify						
(Brazil) 2005	Did not qualify						
(Brazil) 2006	Did not qualify						
(Brazil) 2007	Did not qualify						
(France) 2008	Did not qualify						
(United Arab Emirates) 2009	Did not qualify						
(Italy) 2011	Did not qualify						
(French Polynesia) 2013	Did not qualify						
(Portugal) 2015	Did not qualify						
(The Bahamas) 2017	Did not qualify						
(Paraguay) 2019	Did not qualify						
(Russia) 2021	Did not qualify						
(United Arab Emirates) 2024	Did not qualify						
(Seychelles) 2025	Did not qualify						
Total	18/18	0 Title	0	0	0	0	0

=== Beach Soccer Intercontinental Cup ===
Beach Soccer Intercontinental Cup records
Year	Round	Position	GP	W	L	T	NR
(United Arab Emirates) 2011	Did not participate						
(United Arab Emirates) 2012	Did not participate						
(United Arab Emirates) 2013	Did not participate						
(United Arab Emirates) 2014	Did not participate						
(United Arab Emirates) 2015	Did not participate						
(United Arab Emirates) 2016	Did not participate						
(United Arab Emirates) 2017	Did not participate						
(United Arab Emirates) 2018	Did not participate						
(United Arab Emirates) 2019	Did not participate						
(United Arab Emirates) 2021	Did not participate						
(United Arab Emirates) 2022	Did not participate						
Total	0/11	0 Title	0	0	0	0	0

=== AFC Beach Soccer Asian Cup ===
AFC Beach Soccer Asian Cup records
Year	Round	Position	GP	W	L	T	NR
(United Arab Emirates) 2006	Did not participate						
(United Arab Emirates) 2007	Did not participate						
(United Arab Emirates) 2008	Did not participate						
(United Arab Emirates) 2009	Did not participate						
(Oman) 2011	Did not participate						
(Qatar) 2013	Did not participate						
(Qatar) 2015	Did not participate						
(Malaysia) 2017	Did not participate						
(Thailand) 2019	Did not participate						
(Thailand) 2021	The tournament was postponed due to COVID-19 pandemic						
(Thailand) 2023	Did not participate						
(Thailand) 2025	Did not participate						
Total	0/11	0 Title	0	0	0	0	0

=== Asian Beach Games ===
Asian Beach Games records
Year	Round	Position	GP	W	L	T	NR
(Indonesia) 2008	Did not participate						
(Oman) 2010	Did not participate						
(China) 2012	Did not participate						
(Thailand) 2014	Did not participate						
(Vietnam) 2016	Did not participate						
(China) 2026	To be determined						
Total	0/5	0 Title	0	0	0	0	0

=== South Asian Beach Games ===
South Asian Beach Games records
Year	Round	Position	GP	W	L	T	NR
(Sri Lanka) 2011	Champion	1/4	4	3	1	0	0
Total	1/1	0 Title	4	3	1	0	0
