= List of events at 2011 South Asian Beach Games =

The 2011 South Asian Beach Games will be held in Hambantota, Sri Lanka, from October 8 to October 14, 2011. A total of about 359 athletes representing 8 National Olympic Committees from South Asian countries participated in these Games. Overall, 26 events in 10 disciplines were contested.

== Medal table ==
* Host nation (Sri Lanka)

Rank	Nation	Gold	Silver	Bronze	Total
1	India (IND)	11	9	7	27
2	Sri Lanka (SRI)*	9	10	9	28
3	Pakistan (PAK)	5	2	4	11
4	Nepal (NEP)	1	2	5	8
5	Bangladesh (BAN)	1	1	1	3
6	Maldives (MDV)	0	1	2	3
7	Afghanistan (AFG)	0	1	0	1
8	Bhutan (BHU)	0	0	0	0
Totals (8 entries)		27	26	28	81

== 3-on-3 basketball ==
Event	Gold	Silver	Bronze
Men's team	India	Sri Lanka	Maldives
Women's team	India	Maldives	Sri Lanka

=== Men ===
==== Group A ====
Team	Pld	W	W+	L	GF	GA	GD	Pts
India	3	3	0	0	58	34	+25	6
Sri Lanka	3	2	0	1	52	39	+13	4
Bhutan	3	1	0	2	34	57	-23	2
Maldives	3	0	0	3	43	63	-20	0

October 9
16:00

Sri Lanka	21–7	Bhutan

Hambantota

October 9
16:30

India	19–13	Maldives

Hambantota

October 10
15:00

Bhutan	8–21	India

Hambantota

October 10
15:30

Sri Lanka	19–15	Maldives

Hambantota

October 10
17:00

Maldives	15–19	Bhutan

Hambantota

October 10
17:30

Sri Lanka	12–18	India

Hambantota

==== Bronze medal match ====
October 11
16:00

Bhutan	14–17	Maldives

Hambantota

==== Gold medal match ====
October 11
17:00

India	22–16	Sri Lanka

Hambantota

=== Women ===
==== Group A ====
Team	Pld	W	W+	L	GF	GA	GD	Pts
India	3	3	0	0	61	22	+39	6
Maldives	3	2	0	1	40	31	+8	4
Sri Lanka	3	1	0	2	26	40	-14	2
Nepal	3	0	0	3	20	43	-23	0

October 9
15:00

Sri Lanka	11–13	Maldives

Hambantota

October 9
15:30

India	21–6	Nepal

Hambantota

October 9
17:00

Nepal	6–21	Sri Lanka

Hambantota

October 9
17:30

Maldives	3–21	India

Hambantota

October 10
16:00

Nepal	8–11	Maldives

Hambantota

October 10
16:30

Sri Lanka	13–19	India

Hambantota

==== Bronze medal match ====
October 11
15:30

Sri Lanka	15–11	Nepal

Hambantota

==== Gold medal match ====
October 11
16:30

India	17–7	Maldives

Hambantota

== Beach football ==
Event	Gold	Silver	Bronze
Men's team	Bangladesh	Sri Lanka	Nepal

=== Group A ===
Team	Pld	W	W+	L	GF	GA	GD	Pts
Sri Lanka	3	3	0	0	30	10	+20	9
Bangladesh	3	2	0	1	17	16	+1	6
Nepal	3	1	0	2	8	19	-11	3
Maldives	3	0	0	3	7	20	-10	0

October 8
8:00

Sri Lanka	11 – 2	Nepal
	Report

Hambantota

October 8
9:00

Bangladesh	8 – 3	Maldives
	Report

Hambantota

October 9
8:00

Sri Lanka	12 – 4	Bangladesh
	Report

Hambantota

October 9
9:00

Maldives	3 – 5	Nepal
	Report

Hambantota

October 9
16:00

Bangladesh	5 - 1	Nepal
	Report

Hambantota

October 9
17:00

Sri Lanka	7 - 4	Maldives
	Report

Hambantota

=== Bronze medal match ===
October 10
16:00

Nepal	6 - 2	Maldives
	Report

Hambantota

=== Gold medal match ===
October 10
17:00

Sri Lanka	9 - 10	Bangladesh
	Report

Hambantota

== Beach handball ==
Event	Gold	Silver	Bronze
Men's team	Pakistan; India	Afghanistan	Not awarded

=== Group A ===
Team	Pld	W	L	D	Pts
Pakistan	4	3	0	1	7
India	4	3	0	1	7
Afghanistan	4	2	2	0	4
Sri Lanka	4	1	3	0	2
Nepal	4	0	4	0	0

Date		Score		Set 1	Set 2	Set 3
Oct 11	Sri Lanka	2–0	Nepal	21–8	14–2	
Oct 11	India	2–0	Afghanistan	12–8	14–8	
Oct 11	Pakistan	2–0	Nepal	25–9	16–5	
Oct 11	India	2–1	Sri Lanka	20–9	10–13	1–0
Oct 12	Afghanistan	0–2	Pakistan	11–25	17–18	
Oct 12	Nepal	0–2	India	5–10	4–14	
Oct 12	Pakistan	2–0	Sri Lanka	21–9	22–13	
Oct 12	Nepal	0–2	Afghanistan	14–18	6–16	
Oct 13	Sri Lanka	0–2	Afghanistan	18–23	13–18	
Oct 13	India	1–1	Pakistan	16–26	18–16	4–4

- Both India and Pakistan awarded gold

== Beach kabaddi ==
Event	Gold	Silver	Bronze
Men's team	Pakistan	India	Sri Lanka
Men's team	Pakistan	India	Nepal
Women's team	India	Sri Lanka	Bangladesh
Women's team	India	Sri Lanka	Nepal

=== Men ===
==== Group A ====
Team	Pld	W	D	L	Pts
Pakistan	3	3	0	0	6
India	3	2	0	1	2
Sri Lanka	3	1	0	2	2
Nepal	3	0	0	3	0

October 9; 8:00	Nepal	19 – 71	Sri Lanka	Hambantota

October 9; 16:00	Sri Lanka	32 – 52	Pakistan	Hambantota

October 9; 17:00	India	66 – 23	Nepal	Hambantota

October 10; 9:00	India	32 – 47	Pakistan	Hambantota

October 10; 17:00	Nepal	20 – 66	Pakistan	Hambantota

October 11; 9:45	Sri Lanka	32 – 40	India	Hambantota

==== Gold medal match ====
October 11; 17:00	Pakistan	41 – 34	India	Hambantota

=== Women ===
==== Group A ====
Team	Pld	W	D	L	Pts
India	3	3	0	0	6
Sri Lanka	3	2	0	1	2
Bangladesh	3	1	0	2	2
Nepal	3	0	0	3	0

October 9; 10:00	Nepal	34 – 71	Sri Lanka	Hambantota

October 9; 15:00	India	57 – 27	Bangladesh	Hambantota

October 10; 10:00	Sri Lanka	48 – 40	Bangladesh	Hambantota

October 10; 15:00	India	67 – 23	Nepal	Hambantota

October 11; 8:00	Sri Lanka	28 – 55	India	Hambantota

October 11; 8:45	Bangladesh	64 – 21	Nepal	Hambantota

==== Gold medal match ====
October 11; 17:00	India	57 – 28	Sri Lanka	Hambantota

== Beach netball ==
Event	Gold	Silver	Bronze
Women's team	Sri Lanka	India	Pakistan

== Beach volleyball ==
Event	Gold	Silver	Bronze
Men's pair	Wasantha Ratnapala; Jude Mahesh; Sri Lanka (SRI)	Naveen Sampath; Pubudu Kumara; Sri Lanka (SRI)	Sivabalan; Dhara; India (IND)
Women's pair	Geethika; Thaksila; Sri Lanka (SRI)	Ganga Sagari; Sujeewa Vithanage; Sri Lanka (SRI)	Hemamalini; Ragana; India (IND)

== Tent pegging ==
Event	Gold	Silver	Bronze
Individual lance	Jasvinder Singh Bhatt; India (IND)	Jasvinder Singh; India (IND)	Durga Prasad; Nepal (NEP)
Rings and peg	Durga Prasad; Nepal (NEP)	Jaswinder Singh; India (IND)	Khildhwat Khabka; Nepal (NEP)
Individual sword	Jaswinder Singh; India (IND)	Nar Singh; India (IND)	Sarath Kumara; Sri Lanka (SRI)
Lemon and peg	Krishan Yadar; India (IND)	Jasvinder Singh Bhatt; India (IND)	Sarath Kumara; Sri Lanka (SRI)
Team lance	India	Nepal	Pakistan
Lance and sword Pairs	Haroon Bandyal; Aamir Munnawar; Pakistan (PAK)	Chaudri Rashid; Shebaz Khan; Pakistan (PAK)	Nar Singh; Jaswinder Singh; India (IND)
Team sword	India	Nepal	Sri Lanka
Indian file	India	Pakistan	Sri Lanka

== Lifesaving ==
Event	Gold	Silver	Bronze
Beach sprint	R.M.K.L. Karunarathna; Sri Lanka (SRI)	M.M.P.R. Mel; Sri Lanka (SRI)	Rajesh Haldar; India (IND)
Run swim run	Sahan Rupasinghe; Sri Lanka (SRI)	Shri Pola Chowdhury; Bangladesh (BAN)	N.S. Priyasanka; Sri Lanka (SRI)
Beach relay	D.R.M.K.L. Karnarathna; N.S. Priyasanka; M.M.P.R. Mel; J.A.L.D. Fernando; Sri Lanka (SRI)	Zuber Ganchi; Demudu Chodapulli; Rajesh Haldar; Yashvant Taware; India (IND)	Dilshad; Naeen Ahmed; Mohommad Aslam; Mohomad Ashraf; Pakistan (PAK)
Board race	W.P. Lahiru Fernando; Sri Lanka (SRI)	Demudu Chodipalli; India (IND)	Naeem Ahmed; Pakistan (PAK)
Beach flag	G.H.S. Kelum; Sri Lanka (SRI)	Bhanuka Wijesundara; Sri Lanka (SRI)	Rajesh Haldar; India (IND)
Oceanman/woman	Akila Watareka; Sri Lanka (SRI)	Dilshan Samarathunga; Sri Lanka (SRI)	Amreen Malik; India (IND)

== Marathon swimming ==
Event	Gold	Silver	Bronze
Open 5 km	Mervin Roak Chen; India (IND)	Manda Divas; India (IND)	Pathum Edirishnghe; Sri Lanka (SRI)

== Windsurfing ==
Event	Gold	Silver	Bronze
Mistral One - Open Heavyweight	Sajjad Muhammad; Pakistan (PAK)	Priyantha Gunawardana; Sri Lanka (SRI)	Ram Lal; India (IND)
Mistral One - Open Lightweight	Qasim Abbas Rathore; Pakistan (PAK)	Chameera Gunawardana; Sri Lanka (SRI)	Nooman Aboobakuru; Maldives (MDV)
