= Sayali Gokhale =

Indian badminton player (born 1987)

Personal information
- Born: 1 February 1987 (age 39)

Sport
- Country: India
- Sport: Badminton

Women's singles
- Highest ranking: 54 (8 April 2010)
- BWF profile
Medal record
Women's badminton
Representing India
Uber Cup
Bronze medal – third place	2014 New Delhi	Women's team
South Asian Games
Gold medal – first place	2010 Dhaka	Women's singles
Gold medal – first place	2010 Dhaka	Women's team

Sayali Gokhale (born 1 February 1987) is a badminton player from India. She was the gold medalist at the 2010 Dhaka South Asian Games in the women's singles and team events. Gokhale claimed the Indian National Championship in 2008 and 2012.

== Achievements ==
=== South Asian Games ===
Women's singles
Year	Venue	Opponent	Score	Result
2010	Wooden-Floor Gymnasium, Dhaka, Bangladesh	(India) Trupti Murgunde	21–16, 8–3 Retired	Gold

=== BWF International Challenge/Series ===
Women's singles
Year	Tournament	Opponent	Score	Result
2011	Tata Open India International	(India) P. V. Sindhu	10–21, 22–20, 11–21	(silver) Runner-up
2009	Spanish Open	(Belgium) Lianne Tan	21–9, 21–18	(gold) Winner
2008	Syria International	(India) Sampada Sahastrabuddhe	21–11, 21–17	(gold) Winner

BWF International Challenge tournament
BWF International Series tournament
