= Abdul Wali Khan Sports Complex =

Coordinates: 34°9′26.9″N 71°46′46.9″E

- مجتمع ورزشی عبدالولی خان
- Interactive map of Abdul Wali Khan Sports Complex
- Full name: Abdul Wali Khan Sports Complex
- Location: Charsadda, Pakistan
- Owner: Government of Khyber Pakhtunkhwa
- Operator: Government of Khyber Pakhtunkhwa

Construction
- Opened: 2016

Abdul Wali Khan Sports Complex also known as Charsadda Sports Complex is a sports complex located in Charsadda, Khyber Pakhtunkhwa, in Pakistan. It is the 2nd largest sports complex in Khyber Pakhtunkhwa after Qayyum Sports Complex Peshawar. The sport complex has started functioning in 2016 and has been completed at the cost of Rs.490 million.

== History and development ==
The inauguration of construction work on Abdul Wali Khan sports complex was started in 2012 by ANP President Asfandyar Wali Khan. The sports complex started functioning in 2016. The total cost of project was Rs.490 million.

== Sporting facilities ==
Abdul Wali Khan Sports Complex currently hold sporting facilities for the following sports.

- Cricket Academy
- Football Ground
- Hockey Ground
- Swimming pool
- Indoor facilities for Badminton
- Indoor facilities for Squash
- Outdoor facilities for Tennis
- Table Tennis

== See also ==
- Qayyum Stadium
- Hayatabad Sports Complex
- Mardan Sports Complex Pakistan
- Swat Sports Complex
