= Mardan Sports Complex Pakistan =

Coordinates: 34°08′31.4″N 72°01′36.4″E

- مجتمع ورزشی مردان پاکستان
- Pakistan
- Interactive map of Mardan Sports Complex Pakistan
- Full name: Mardan Sports Complex Pakistan
- Location: Sheikh Maltoon Town Mardan, Pakistan
- Owner: Government of Khyber Pakhtunkhwa
- Operator: Government of Khyber Pakhtunkhwa

Construction
- Opened: 2006

Mardan Sports Complex is a sports complex located in Mardan in Khyber Pakhtunkhwa province of Pakistan. The complex has facilities for all major sports such as Cricket, Football, Hockey, Swimming Pool, Basketball, Volleyball, Squash Court, Indoor Female Gymnasium, Climbing Wall and Open Air Gym.

== History and development ==
Mardan Sports Complex is a multiple purpose sports complex located in Sheikh Maltoon Town Mardan. It was constructed in 2006 by Mardan district government with the help of Government of Pakistan.This sports complex was built on the cost of Rs. 334 million. Initially, facilities for cricket, football, basketball and volleyball were made available. The swimming pool facility was then built in 2011 at the cost of Rs.50 million while in 2016, the PTI led government of Khyber Pakhtunkhwa constructed an international standard hockey turf at the sports complex at the cost Rs.67.69 million.

== Sporting facilities ==
Mardan Sports Complex currently hold sporting facilities for the following sports.

- Hockey Ground
- Football Ground
- Cricket Ground
- Athletics track
- Boxing
- Swimming pool
- Indoor facilities for Badminton
- Table Tennis
- Judo, wushu and taekwondo

== See also ==
- Qayyum Stadium
- Hayatabad Sports Complex
- Abdul Wali Khan Sports Complex
- Swat Sports Complex
