= India at the 1999 South Asian Games =

- IOC code: IND
- NOC: Indian Olympic Association

in Kathmandu
- Medals Ranked 1st: Gold 102 Silver 58 Bronze 37 Total 197

South Asian Games appearances (overview)
- 1984; 1985; 1987; 1989; 1991; 1993; 1995; 1999; 2004; 2006; 2010; 2016; 2019; 2025

India competed at the 1999 South Asian Games held in Kathmandu, Nepal. In this edition of the South Asian Games, India ranked 1st with 102 gold medals and 197 in total.
