= Swat Sports Complex =

Coordinates: 34°45′53.7″N 72°21′29.2″E

- مجتمع ورزشی سوات
- Pakistan
- Interactive map of Swat Sports Complex
- Full name: Swat Sports Complex
- Location: Swat
- Owner: Pakistan Army
- Operator: Pakistan Army

Construction
- Opened: 2010

Swat Sports Complex is a sports complex located in Swat, Khyber Pakhtunkhwa province in Pakistan. The Sports Complex was formally opened on 29 November 2010.

== History and development ==
Swat Sports Complex started functioning on 29 November 2010. The sports complex was formally inaugurated by Brig Hamayun Aziz and was funded by Pakistan Army. The complex was initially open for civil servants but later the general public was also allowed membership by paying nominal fee.

== Sporting facilities ==
Swat Sports Complex currently sporting facilities for the following sports.

- Squash
- Volleyball
- Table Tennis
- Gymnastic
- Bodybuilding
- Snooker

== See also ==
- Qayyum Stadium
- Hayatabad Sports Complex
- Abdul Wali Khan Sports Complex
- Mardan Sports Complex Pakistan
