= India at the 2004 South Asian Games =

- IOC code: IND
- NOC: Indian Olympic Association

in Islamabad
- Medals Ranked 1st: Gold 103 Silver 57 Bronze 22 Total 182

South Asian Games appearances (overview)
- 1984; 1985; 1987; 1989; 1991; 1993; 1995; 1999; 2004; 2006; 2010; 2016; 2019; 2025

India competed at the 2004 South Asian Games held in Islamabad, Pakistan. In this edition of the South Asian Games, India ranked 1st with 103 gold medals and 182 in total.
