= India at the 1995 South Asian Games =

- IOC code: IND
- NOC: Indian Olympic Association

in Chennai
- Medals Ranked 1st: Gold 106 Silver 60 Bronze 19 Total 185

South Asian Games appearances (overview)
- 1984; 1985; 1987; 1989; 1991; 1993; 1995; 1999; 2004; 2006; 2010; 2016; 2019; 2025

India competed at the 1995 South Asian Games held in Madras, India. In this edition of the South Asian Games, India ranked 1st with 106 gold medals and 185 in total.
