= Alina Begum =

Bangladeshi badminton player

Alina Begum is a Bangladeshi badminton player.

== Career ==
Alina Begum won her first two national titles in Bangladesh in 1990. Alina Begum won fourteen further titles until 2001. She was champion nine times in women's singles, six times in doubles and once in mixed doubles. In 2004, Begum received a sports award for the year 2001 from the Bangladesh Sports Writers Association.
