= Konika Rani Adhikary =

Bangladeshi badminton player

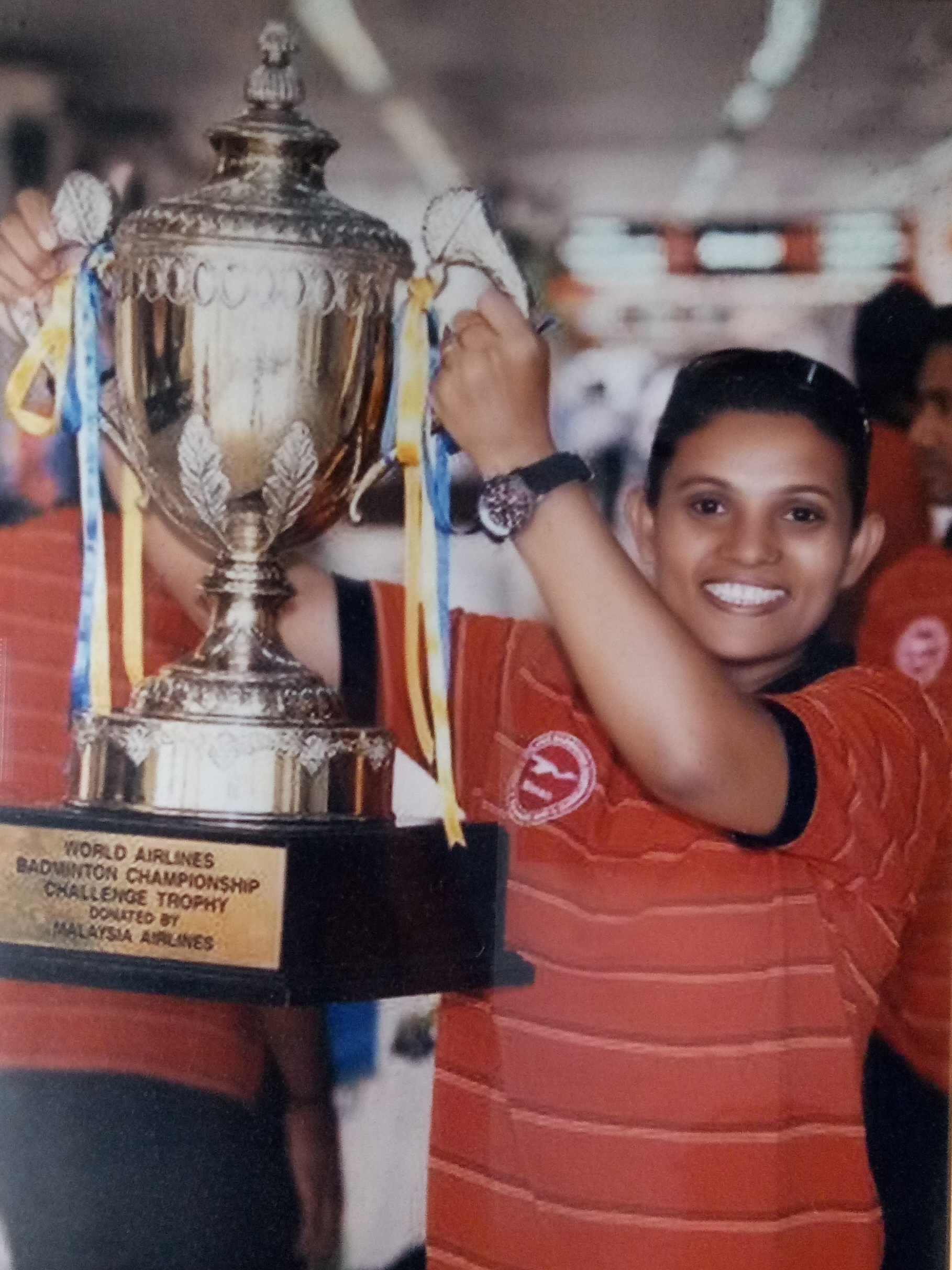

Personal information
- Birth name: রানী অধিকারী
- Country: Bangladesh
- Born: 2 December 1979 (age 45); Bangladesh
- Event: Women's singles & doubles
Medal record
Women's badminton
Representing Bangladesh
South Asian Games
Bronze medal – third place	2010 Dhaka	Women's team
- BWF profile

Konika Rani Adhikary (Bengali: রানী অধিকারী; born 2 December 1979) is a Bangladeshi badminton player and national champion. She is part of the Bangladesh National Badminton team and has represented Bangladesh in internationals tournaments.

== Biography ==
Konika Rani Adhikary won her first national title in 1996 against Sharmin Akthar Momo. She has won 15 titles in her career including seven times in mixed, six times in women's doubles and twice in singles. In 2005 she represented Bangladesh in Asian Badminton Confederation Championship. She participated in the Bajaj Discover Nepal International Series 2008 Badminton Championship in the mixed doubles event with fellow Bangladeshi Abdul Hannan. They lost to Balram Thapa and Pooja Shrestha of Nepal in the opening day of the tournament. She participated in the 11th South Asian Games but lost her match against Pakistani Tennis player Alina in January 2010. She beat Palwasha Basheer, from the Pakistan team in the 2010 South Asian Games, securing Bangladesh badminton team victory over the Pakistan national team, three to one in Bangladesh's favor. She was part of the 2010 badminton national squad of Bangladesh.

== Sporting achievements ==
Season	Event	Discipline	Place	Name
1996	Bangladeshi Championship	Women's doubles	1	Konika Rani Adhikary / Sharmin Akthar Momo
1997	Bangladeshi Championship	Mixed	1	Rasel Kabir Sumon / Konika Rani Adhikary
1998	Bangladeshi Championship	Mixed	1	Mahbubur Rob / Konika Rani Adhikary
1998	Bangladeshi Championship	Women's doubles	1	Konika Rani Adhikary / Sharmin Akthar Momo
1999	Bangladeshi Championship	Mixed	1	Rasel Kabir Sumon / Konika Rani Adhikary
2000	Bangladeshi Championship	Women's doubles	1	Konika Rani Adhikary / Sharmin Akthar Momo
2001	Bangladeshi Championship	Mixed	1	Rasel Kabir Sumon / Konika Rani Adhikary
2003	Bangladeshi Championship	Women's doubles	1	Sharmin Akthar Momo / Konika Rani Adhikary
2003	Bangladeshi Championship	Women's Single	1	Konika Rani Adhikary
2005	Bangladeshi Championship	Mixed	1	Konika Rani Adhikary / Rasel Kabir Sumon
2006	Bangladeshi Championship	Mixed	1	Konika Rani Adhikary / Rasel Kabir Sumon
2006	Bangladeshi Championship	Women's doubles	1	Konika Rani Adhikary / Shapla Akhter
2006	Bangladeshi Championship	Women's Single	1	Konika Rani Adhikary
2008	Bangladeshi Championship	Mixed	1	Konika Rani Adhikary / Rasel Kabir Sumon
2008	Bangladeshi Championship	Women's doubles	1	Konika Rani Adhikary / Jebunnesa Seema
