= Ashok Kumar Karki =

Nepalese weightlifter

Personal information
- Nationality: Nepalese
- Born: 18 February 1956 (age 69)

Sport
- Sport: Weightlifting

Ashok Kumar Karki (born 18 February 1956) is a Nepalese weightlifter. He competed in the men's bantamweight event at the 1980 Summer Olympics.
