= India at the 2010 South Asian Games =

- IOC code: IND
- NOC: Indian Olympic Association

in Dhaka
- Medals Ranked 1st: Gold 90 Silver 55 Bronze 30 Total 175

South Asian Games appearances (overview)
- 1984; 1985; 1987; 1989; 1991; 1993; 1995; 1999; 2004; 2006; 2010; 2016; 2019; 2025

India competed at the 2010 South Asian Games held in Dhaka, Bangladesh from 29 January to 8 February 2010. India ranked 1st with 90 gold medals in this edition of the South Asian Games.
