= Hayatabad Sports Complex =

Recreational facility in Peshawar, Pakistan

Coordinates: 33°58′22.0″N 71°26′29.8″E

- مجتمع ورزشی حیات آباد
- Pakistan
- Interactive map of Hayatabad Sports Complex
- Full name: Hayatabad Sports Complex
- Location: Peshawar, Khyber Pakhtunkhwa, Pakistan
- Owner: Pakistan Cricket Board
- Capacity: 36,000

Construction
- Opened: 2016; 10 years ago

Tenants
- Pakistan national cricket team (planned); Peshawar Zalmi (planned)

Hayatabad Sports Complex is a sports complex located in Hayatabad, Peshawar, the capital of Khyber Pakhtunkhwa province in Pakistan. The sports complex It is owned by the Government of Khyber Pakhtunkhwa. It was formally inaugurated after renovation in October 2016.

== History and development ==
Hayatabad Sports Complex, Peshawar was originally constructed in the early 1990s and had sporting facilities for all major sports. However, in the late 1990s, the sports facility was turned into commercial hub, private party arena, along with a marriage hall. Renovation work was started in June 2013 and completed in October 2016, at a cost of Rs.210 million. It was then formally inaugurated after renovation by PTI Chairman Imran Khan. It currently covers an area of 501.6 m^{2} (5,399 sq ft).

Peshawar's Hayatabad Cricket Stadium with a crowd capacity of over 10,000 spectators is all set to host national and international matches in upcoming months. Upgradation of the stadium has completed by National Logistics Cell (NLC) under the supervision of NESPAK and Khyber Pakhtunkhwa Sport Directorate. The stadium has been completed by the National Logistics Cell (NLC) in two years and cutting-edge facilities have been provided including the main pavilion, general stands, Pakistan's largest digital scoreboard, media boxes for both print and electronic media, firefighting, HVAC systems, security and extra-low voltage (ELV) systems, and other allied amenities etc.

== Sporting facilities ==
Hayatabad Sports Complex currently contains sporting facilities for the following sports.

- Football
- Field Hockey
- Cricket
- Swimming
- Squash
- Board Games
- Table Tennis
- Badminton
- Tennis
- Gymnasium
- Basketball
- Archery

== See also ==
- List of stadiums in Pakistan
- Arbab Niaz Stadium
- Peshawar Club Ground
- Qayyum Stadium
- Abdul Wali Khan Sports Complex
- Mardan Sports Complex Pakistan
- Swat Sports Complex
