= Qayyum Stadium =

Coordinates: 33°59′33″N 71°32′07″E

- د قیوم لوبغالی
- Pakistan
- Interactive map of Qayyum Stadium
- Full name: Qayyum Stadium
- Location: Peshawar, Pakistan
- Owner: Government of Khyber Pakhtunkhwa
- Operator: Government of Khyber Pakhtunkhwa
- Capacity: 15,000
- Surface: Grass

The Qayyum Stadium, also known as Peshawar Stadium, is a multi-purpose stadium in Peshawar, the capital of Khyber Pakhtunkhwa province in Pakistan. The sports complex is owned by the Government of Khyber Pakhtunkhwa. It has an overall capacity of 15,000 spectators. The stadium is part of the Peshawar Sports Complex which houses several facilities for all major sports including football, field hockey, squash, wrestling, boxing, badminton and swimming.

== History and development ==
Plans for a major public sports stadium in Peshawar were initiated in the early 1950s under the provincial government of Abdul Qayyum Khan. On 19 January 1952, a meeting of the Olympic Stadium Committee was held in Peshawar under Qyyum Khan presidentship to review progress on the proposed stadium. During this meeting, after the presentation of the 1949–51 report, members proposed that the new facility be named Qayyum Stadium. The proposal was unanimously approved, despite Abdul Qayyum Khan's own objection to having the stadium named after him. He nevertheless assured the committee of his cooperation in completing the project.

In the 1980s, the Peshawar Stadium was transferred to Pakistan Sports Board, and work was initiated to convert in into a standard sports complex including a Gymnasium Hall, Mini Hall, Squash Courts, and Sportsmen Hostel. The scheme was approved in 1983, the construction work was initiated in 1985 and completed in 1990.

== Hosting history ==
=== Multi-sport events ===
- National Games of Pakistan 2010
- FATA Youth Festival 2015
- National Games of Pakistan 2019

=== Athletics ===
- All Pakistan Inter-varsity Athletics Championship 2012

=== Football events ===
- 1985 Quaid-e-Azam International Tournament
- 1992 Summer Olympics Asian Qualifiers (Pakistan vs Qatar) 1991
- 2019 PFF National Challenge Cup

=== Wrestling events ===
- Bacha Khan International Wrestling for Peace Championship 2012
- Wrestling for Peace Festival 2012

== Football tournaments ==
The stadium was the venue for the 1985 Quaid-e-Azam International Tournament.

| Date | Team #1 | Res. | Team #2 | Round | Attendance |
|---|---|---|---|---|---|
| 28 April 1985 | Pakistan Greens | 0–0 | North Korea XI | Group stage | N/A |
| 28 April 1985 | Bangladesh | 1–1 | Indonesia Youth | Group stage | N/A |
| 29 April 1985 | North Korea XI | 8–1 | Nepal | Group stage | N/A |
| 29 April 1985 | Pakistan Whites | 0–2 | Indonesia Youth | Group stage | N/A |
| 30 April 1985 | Pakistan Greens | 1–0 | Nepal | Group stage | N/A |
| 30 April 1985 | Pakistan Whites | 0–3 | Bangladesh | Group stage | N/A |
| 2 May 1985 | Indonesia Youth | 0–7 | North Korea XI | Semi-finals | N/A |
| 2 May 1985 | Pakistan Greens | 1–3 | Bangladesh | Semi-finals | N/A |
| 4 May 1985 | Pakistan Greens | 1–3 | Indonesia Youth | Third-place match | N/A |
| 4 May 1985 | Bangladesh | 0–1 | North Korea XI | Final | N/A |

== See also ==
- List of stadiums in Pakistan
- Arbab Niaz Stadium
- Peshawar Club Ground
- Hayatabad Sports Complex
- Abdul Wali Khan Sports Complex
- Mardan Sports Complex Pakistan
- Swat Sports Complex
