= South Asian Games =

Multi-sport event in South Asia

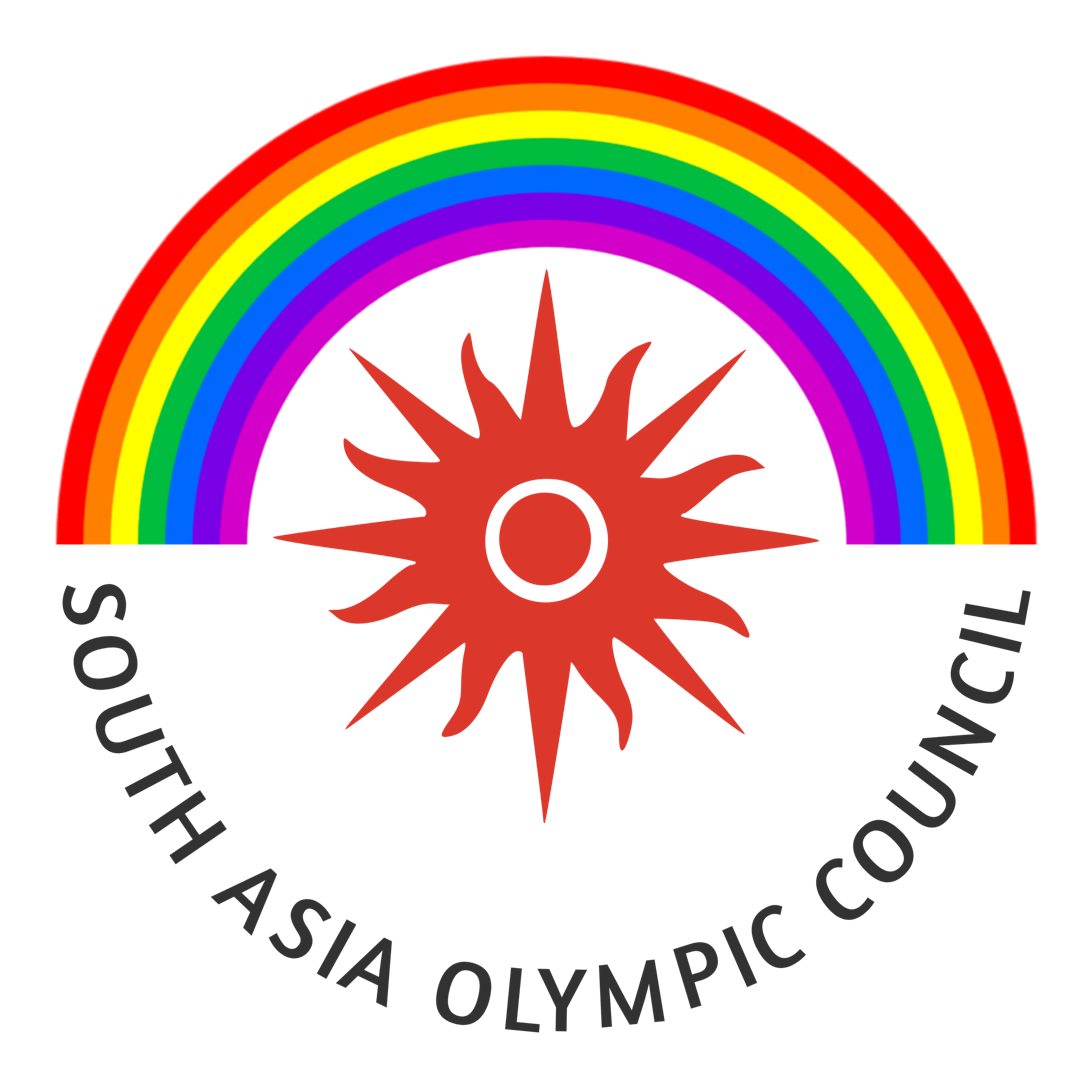
- Abbreviation: SAG
- Motto: Peace, Prosperity Progress
- Purpose: Multi-sport event for nations in South Asia
- Frequency: Every four years
- Inaugurated: 1984 South Asian Games, Kathmandu, Nepal
- Most recent: 2019 South Asian Games, Kathmandu and Pokhara, Nepal
- Next event: 2027 South Asian Games, 3 host cities, Pakistan

The South Asian Games is a quadrennial multi-sport event held among athletes from South Asia. The South Asia Olympic Council, which was formed in 1983, governs it. The Games consist of seven countries, namely Bangladesh, Bhutan, India, Maldives, Nepal, Pakistan, and Sri Lanka. Afghanistan had participated in the Games four times, but left the SAOC after participating in 2016.

The first South Asian Games were hosted by Kathmandu, Nepal in 1984. From 1984 to 1987 they were held every year except 1986, as it was a year of Commonwealth Games and Asian Games. From 1987 onwards, they have been held every two years except for some occasions. In 2004, the South Asian Sports Council decided to rename the games from the South Asian Federation Games to the South Asian Games as officials believed the word federation was diminishing the emphasis on the event and acting as a barrier to attracting spectators.

These are often known as the South Asian version of Olympic Games. The XIII South Asian Games was held at Kathmandu, Pokhara and Janakpur from 1 December to 10 December 2019.

The South Asian Games is one of five subregional Games of the Olympic Council of Asia. The others are Central Asian Games, East Asian Youth Games, Southeast Asian Games, and West Asian Games.

== Editions ==
Host cities of the South Asian Games

Edition	Year	Host Cities	Host nation	Nations	Sports	Events	Top Nation	Ref
1	1984	Kathmandu	Nepal	7	5	62	India	
2	1985	Dhaka	Bangladesh	7	7	94	India	
3	1987	Calcutta	India	7	10	116	India	
4	1989	Islamabad	Pakistan	7	10	114	India	
5	1991	Colombo	Sri Lanka	7	10	142	India	
6	1993	Dhaka	Bangladesh	7	11	115	India	
7	1995	Madras	India	7	14	143	India	
8	1999	Kathmandu	Nepal	7	12	163	India	
9	2004	Islamabad	Pakistan	8	15	170	India	
10	2006	Colombo	Sri Lanka	8	20	197	India	
11	2010	Dhaka	Bangladesh	8	23	158	India	
12	2016	Guwahati; Shillong	India	8	22	226	India	
13	2019	Kathmandu; Pokhara	Nepal	7	26	317	India	
14	2027	Islamabad; Lahore; Peshawar	Pakistan	7	37	TBD		

== List of sports ==
Following 29 sports have been competed in South Asian Games history till latest edition:

- Archery
- Athletics
- Badminton
- Baseball
- Basketball
- 3x3 basketball
- Boxing
- Canoeing
- Cricket
- Fencing
- Field hockey
- Football
- Golf
- Gymnastics
- Handball
- Judo
- Kabaddi
- Karate
- Kho kho
- Rowing
- Sailing
- Shooting
- Squash
- Swimming
- Table tennis
- Taekwondo
- Tennis
- Triathlon
- Volleyball
- Weightlifting
- Wrestling
- Wushu

== Medal table ==
Rank	NOC	Gold	Silver	Bronze	Total
1	India	1263	736	379	2378
2	Pakistan	297	421	432	1150
3	Sri Lanka	250	436	681	1367
4	Nepal	124	186	380	690
5	Bangladesh	86	210	493	789
6	Bhutan	2	23	66	91
7	Maldives	1	3	13	17
Former member ^{1}
—N/a	Afghanistan	21	28	79	128

^{1} Left SAOC and joined CAG.

- Updated through 2019 South Asian Games

== Medals by year ==
Rank	NOC	1984			1985			1987			1989			1991			1993			1995			1999			2004			2006			2010			2016			2019		
Rank	NOC	1st place, gold medalist(s)	2nd place, silver medalist(s)	3rd place, bronze medalist(s)	1st place, gold medalist(s)	2nd place, silver medalist(s)	3rd place, bronze medalist(s)	1st place, gold medalist(s)	2nd place, silver medalist(s)	3rd place, bronze medalist(s)	1st place, gold medalist(s)	2nd place, silver medalist(s)	3rd place, bronze medalist(s)	1st place, gold medalist(s)	2nd place, silver medalist(s)	3rd place, bronze medalist(s)	1st place, gold medalist(s)	2nd place, silver medalist(s)	3rd place, bronze medalist(s)	1st place, gold medalist(s)	2nd place, silver medalist(s)	3rd place, bronze medalist(s)	1st place, gold medalist(s)	2nd place, silver medalist(s)	3rd place, bronze medalist(s)	1st place, gold medalist(s)	2nd place, silver medalist(s)	3rd place, bronze medalist(s)	1st place, gold medalist(s)	2nd place, silver medalist(s)	3rd place, bronze medalist(s)	1st place, gold medalist(s)	2nd place, silver medalist(s)	3rd place, bronze medalist(s)	1st place, gold medalist(s)	2nd place, silver medalist(s)	3rd place, bronze medalist(s)	1st place, gold medalist(s)	2nd place, silver medalist(s)	3rd place, bronze medalist(s)
1	India	44	28	16	61	32	14	91	45	19	61	43	20	64	59	41	60	46	31	106	60	19	102	58	37	103	57	32	118	69	47	90	55	30	188	92	28	175	92	45
2	Pakistan	5	3	2	21	26	12	16	36	14	42	33	22	28	32	25	23	22	20	10	33	36	10	36	30	38	55	50	43	44	71	19	25	36	12	35	57	30	41	57
3	Sri Lanka	7	11	19	2	7	9	4	7	23	6	10	21	44	34	40	20	22	39	16	25	53	16	42	62	17	32	57	37	63	78	16	35	54	25	64	98	40	84	128
4	Nepal	4	12	8	1	9	22	2	7	33	1	13	32	2	8	29	1	6	15	4	8	16	31	10	24	7	6	20	9	15	31	8	9	19	3	23	35	51	60	96
5	Bangladesh	2	8	13	9	17	38	3	20	31	1	12	24	4	8	28	11	19	32	7	17	34	2	10	35	3	13	24	3	15	34	18	23	56	4	16	55	19	32	89
6	Bhutan	0	0	2	0	0	4	0	1	5	0	0	3	0	0	0	0	0	0	0	0	2	1	6	7	1	3	2	0	3	10	0	2	3	0	1	15	0	7	13
7	Maldives	0	0	1	0	0	0	0	0	0	0	0	0	0	1	0	0	0	0	0	0	1	0	0	4	0	0	0	0	0	0	0	0	2	0	2	1	1	0	4
Former Member
—N/a	Afghanistan	Not part of SAOC																								1	3	28	6	7	16	7	9	16	7	9	19	Not part of SAOC		

== Performance table ==
Country	Top Ranked	Second Ranked	Third Ranked
India	13 times	—N/a	—N/a
Pakistan	—N/a	7 times	4 times
Sri Lanka	—N/a	4 times	7 times
Nepal	—N/a	2 times	—N/a
Bangladesh	—N/a	—N/a	2 times

== Related ==
=== South Asian Beach Games ===
Edition	Year	Host city	Host nation	Top Placed Team
I	2011	Hambantota	Sri Lanka	India (IND)

=== South Asian Winter Games ===
Edition	Year	Host Cities	Host nation	Top Placed Team
I	2011	Dehradun and Auli	India	India (IND)

== See also ==
- Traditional games of South Asia

- Events of the OCA (Continental)
  - Asian Games
  - Asian Winter Games
  - Asian Youth Games
  - Asian Beach Games
  - Asian Indoor and Martial Arts Games
- Events of the OCA (Subregional)
  - Central Asian Games
  - East Asian Games (now defunct)
  - East Asian Youth Games
  - Southeast Asian Games
  - West Asian Games
- Events of the APC (Continental)
  - Asian Para Games
  - Asian Winter Para Games
  - Asian Youth Para Games
  - Asian Youth Winter Para Games
- Events of the APC (Subregional)
  - ASEAN Para Games
