= South Asia Olympic Council =

Governing body of sports in South Asia

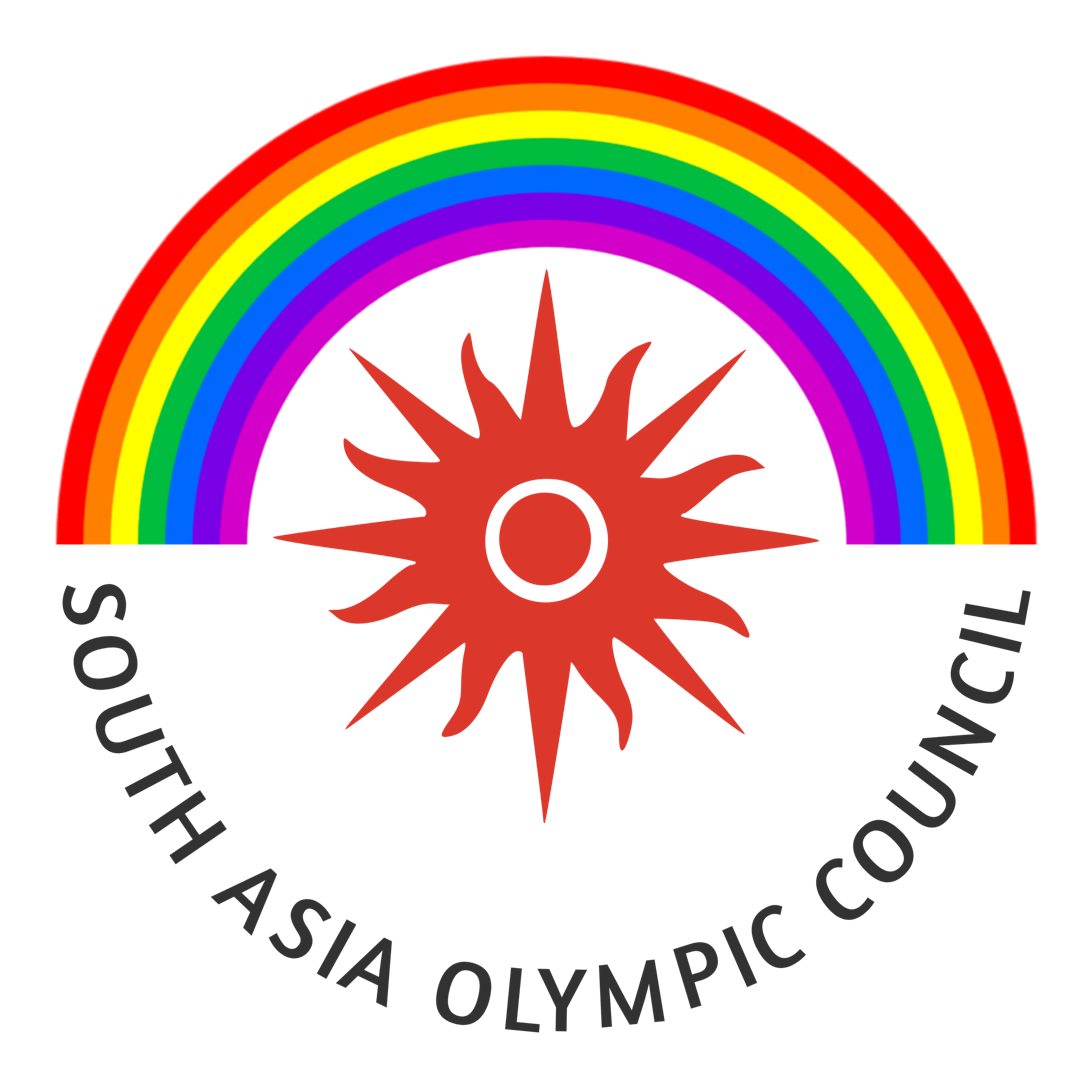
- Abbreviation: SAOC
- Formation: 1983; 43 years ago
- Type: Sports governing body
- Members: South Asia
- Official language: English
- President: Lieutenant-General Syed Arif Hasan
- Secretary General: Muhammad Khalid Mahmood
- Affiliations: Olympic Council of Asia

The South Asia Olympic Council, aka SAOC and formerly known as the South Asian Sports Federation, is the governing body of sports in South Asia. It currently has 7 National Olympic Committees members.

== History ==
South Asian Games Federation (SAGF) was formed officially in 1983. In 2004, in 32nd meeting of South Asian Sports Federation held at Islamabad (Pakistan), it was decided to rename it to its current name i.e. South Asia Olympic Council.

The SAOC headquarters is located in host city of future South Asian Games and the President of NOC hosting the SAG holds the position of SAOC President. Its current President is Lieutenant-General Syed Arif Hasan from Pakistan.

== Member nations ==
Following is the list of member countries of SAOC:

S. No.	Member
1.	Bangladesh Olympic Association
2.	Bhutan Olympic Committee
3.	(India) Indian Olympic Association
4.	Maldives Olympic Committee
5.	Nepal Olympic Committee
6.	Pakistan Olympic Association
7.	National Olympic Committee of Sri Lanka

=== Former members ===
Following is the list of former member countries of SAOC:

S. No.	Member	Joined	Left	Notes
1.	Afghanistan National Olympic Committee	2004	2016	Afghanistan joined Central Asian Games

== SAOC Presidents ==
As per the Constitution of SAOC, the President of NOC hosting the next South Asian Games is the president of SAOC.

S. No.	Name	Country	Term
1.	Sarad Chandra Shah	Nepal	1983 – 1984
2.	Lt. Gen Hussain Muhammad Ershad	Bangladesh	1984 – 1985
3.	Vidya Charan Shukla	India	1985 – 1987
4.	Syed Wajid Ali	Pakistan	1987 – 1989
5.	Data Unavailable	Sri Lanka	1989 – 1991
6.	Mushfekur Rahman	Bangladesh	1991 – 1991
7.	Abdur Rouf	Bangladesh	1991 – 1991
8.	Nurul Momen	Bangladesh	1992 – 1992
9.	Gias Kamal Chowdhury	Bangladesh	1992 – 1993
10.	Suresh Kalmadi	India	1993 – 1995
11.	Gavinda Raj Joshi	Nepal	1995 – 1998
12.	Rukma Shamsher Rana	Nepal	1998 – 1999
13.	Syed Wajid Ali	Pakistan	1999 – 2004
14.	Data Unavailable	Sri Lanka	2004 – 2006
15.	General Moeen U Ahmed	Bangladesh	2006 – 2009
16.	General Md Abdul Mubeen	Bangladesh	2009 – 2010
17.	Suresh Kalmadi	India	2010 – 2011
Acting	Vijay Kumar Malhotra	India	2011 – 2012
18.	Abhay Singh Chautala	India	2012 – 2014
19.	Narayana Ramachandran	India	2014 – 2016
20.	Jeevan Ram Shrestha	Nepal	2016 – 2019
21.	Lt. Gen Syed Arif Hasan	Pakistan	2019 – present

== Events ==
- South Asian Games
- South Asian Winter Games
- South Asian Beach Games

Competition	Edition	Top rank	Title	Runners-up	Most successful	Next edition
South Asian Games	Kathmandu and Pokhara 2019	India	13th	Nepal	India (13)	Lahore 2025
South Asian Winter Games	Dehradun and Auli 2011	India	1st	Pakistan	India (1)	
South Asian Beach Games	Hambantota 2011	India	1st	Sri Lanka	India (1)	

== See also ==
- Central Asian Games
- East Asian Games (now defunct)
- East Asian Youth Games
- South Asian Games
- Southeast Asian Games
- West Asian Games
