= Auli, India =

Auli
- Hill station
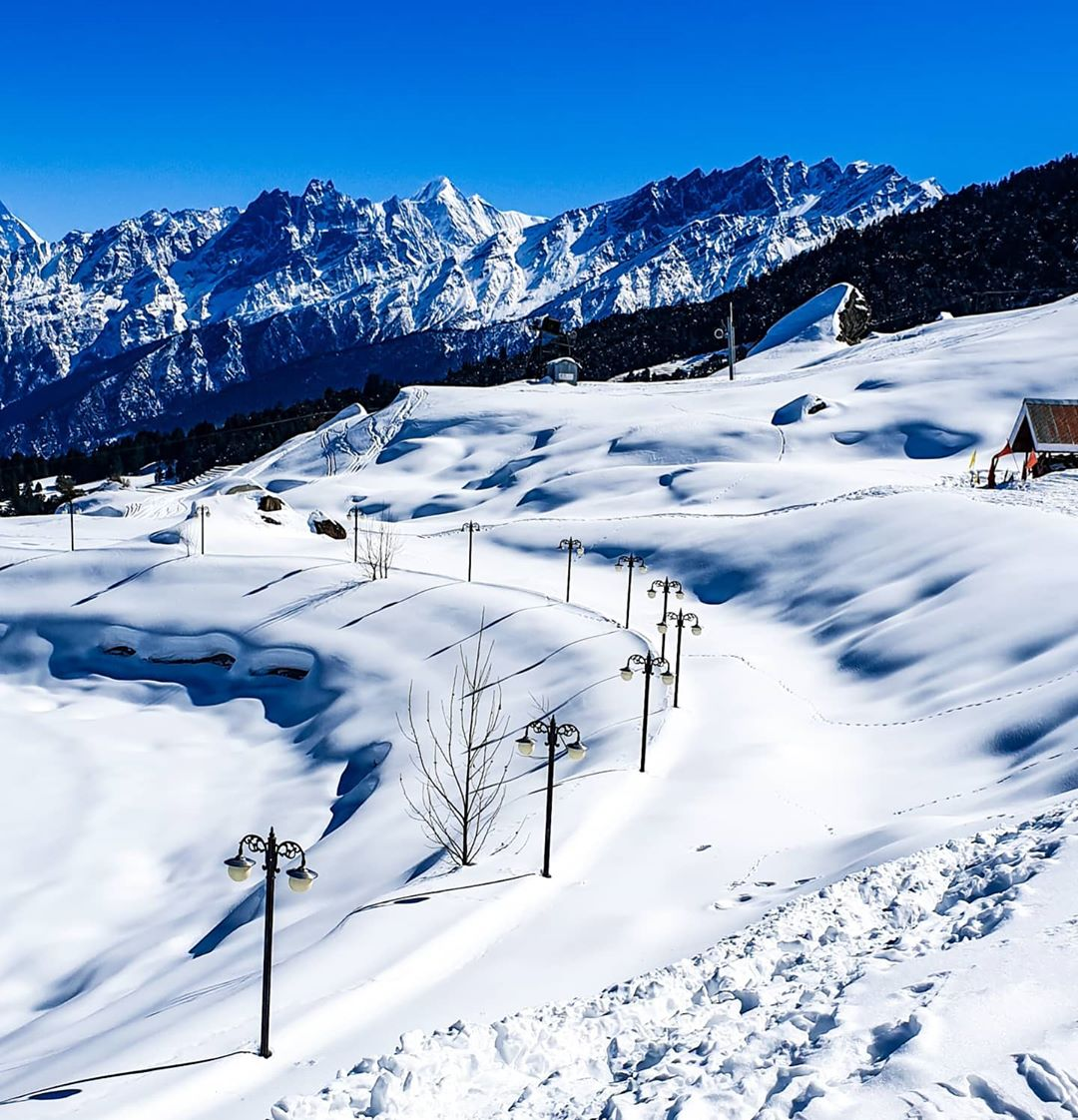
- View of Auli Hill station

- Location in Uttarakhand Auli (India)
- Coordinates: 30.52892°N 79.57026°E
- Country: India
- State: Uttarakhand
- District: Chamoli
- Elevation: 2,909 m (9,544 ft)

Language
  - Official: Hindi
  - Regional: Garhwali
- Time zone: UTC+5:30 (IST)
- Vehicle registration: UK 11
- Website: uk.gov.in

Auli is in Chamoli district in the Himalayan mountains of Uttarakhand, India. Auli, also known as Auli Bugyal, in Garhwali, which means "meadow", is located at an elevation of 2,800 metres (9,200 ft) above sea level. Between June and October, the valley has one of the highest numbers of flower species found anywhere in the world, with 520 species of high-altitude plants, 498 of which are flowering plants with significant populations of endangered species.

== History ==
This place came to light when in the 8th century, Adiguru Shri Shankaracharya established a Matha (Jyotir Math or Shri Shankaracharya Math) at Joshimath, about 6.6 km from Auli, which still exists today. After the establishment of the monastery, this place also came to be known as the "Gateway of the Himalayas". After the establishment of this math, Adi Shankaracharya Ji moved forward like Badrinath. Semi-nomadic tribes of Tibetans, Mongolians and Bhotias conducted trade and communication between Tibet ( China) and India from here. They took the help of their long haired yaks and horses to cross the snowy mountains of the Himalayas. The popular Trishul peak (23,490 feet) is the scene of an unusual expedition that took place here in 1958. It took the mountaineers almost four days to climb and about 90 minutes to ski down to the base.

== Tourism ==
Auli is a hiking and ski destination and after the creation of the state of Uttarakhand, formerly part of Uttar Pradesh, Auli was marketed as a tourist destination. It is surrounded by coniferous and oak forests, with a panoramic view of the peaks of the Himalayas. The slopes are intended for both professional skiers and novices. The Garhwal Mandal Vikas Nigam Limited (GMVNL) a state government agency which takes care of this resort, and Uttarakhand Tourism Department conduct winter sports competitions at Auli to encourage skiing in India.

== Climate ==
Cwb.

Climate data for Auli
| Month | Jan | Feb | Mar | Apr | May | Jun | Jul | Aug | Sep | Oct | Nov | Dec | Year |
|---|---|---|---|---|---|---|---|---|---|---|---|---|---|
| Mean daily maximum °C (°F) | 2.5 (36.5) | 3.4 (38.1) | 6.7 (44.1) | 10.9 (51.6) | 14.7 (58.5) | 17.2 (63.0) | 17.5 (63.5) | 17.2 (63.0) | 16.1 (61.0) | 12.8 (55.0) | 9.8 (49.6) | 6.4 (43.5) | 11.3 (52.3) |
| Mean daily minimum °C (°F) | −7.6 (18.3) | −6.4 (20.5) | −4.4 (24.1) | −0.7 (30.7) | 3.2 (37.8) | 8.2 (46.8) | 11.9 (53.4) | 11.7 (53.1) | 8.2 (46.8) | 2.4 (36.3) | −0.8 (30.6) | −4.2 (24.4) | 1.8 (35.2) |
| Average precipitation mm (inches) | 119 (4.7) | 125 (4.9) | 139 (5.5) | 70 (2.8) | 56 (2.2) | 117 (4.6) | 333 (13.1) | 312 (12.3) | 186 (7.3) | 60 (2.4) | 28 (1.1) | 55 (2.2) | 1,600 (63.1) |
Source: https://en.climate-data.org/location/275421/

== Sports ==
Auli is a major center for winter sports in India with Skii slopes. Alpine skiing and cross country skiing. Auli hosted the inaugural South Asian Winter Games in 2011. Auli also hosted Winter National Games of India. Auli is also popular for adventure sports such as Rafting, Mountain trekking etc.
