= 2011 South Asian Beach Games =

Multi-sport event in Sri Lanka

I South Asian Beach Games
- Host city: Hambantota, Sri Lanka
- Motto: "Our sun to shine on you"
- Nations: 8
- Athletes: 359
- Events: 26 in 10 Sports
- Opening: 8 October
- Closing: 14 October
- Opened by: President of Sri Lanka Mahinda Rajapaksa
- Main venue: Hambantota Beach Stadium

The 1st South Asian Beach Games was held in Hambantota, Sri Lanka between 8 and 14 October 2011. The opening ceremony was held at the Hambantota Beach Stadium, located in Hambantota district. 359 athletes from eight South Asian nations were competed.

== Host city selection ==
Sri Lankan bid for Hambantota was selected over bids of Bangladesh and the Maldives by the South Asian National Olympic Committees in a unanimous decision.

== Logo and the Mascot ==
The logo was launched on 20 January 2011 in Galle. The Mascot represents a character called "Salu Paaliya" which is one of the 12 Palis. Palis are characters which represents various dance forms. It is believed that the "Salu Paaliya" has comical actions and the power to heal which is ideal for the Beach Games as the Mascot.

== Sports ==
Marathon swimming and sailing were to be contested in Arugam Bay while the remaining sports were contested in Hambantota. However, later organizers decided to move the events closer locations, Tangalle and Tissamaharama. 26 events in 10 sports were held. Triathlon and beach bodybuilding were dropped from the program due to a lack of participants.

- 3-on-3 basketball(2)
- Beach football (1)
- Beach handball (1)
- Beach kabbadi (2)
- Beach netball (1)
- Beach Volleyball (2)
- Marathon swimming (2)
- Lifesaving (6)
- Tent pegging (8)
- Windsurfing (1)

== Participating nations ==
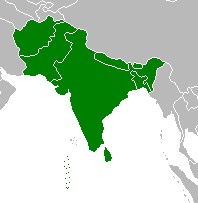
Participating nations.

A total of eight countries participated at the 2011 South Asian Beach Games.

- Afghanistan
- Bangladesh (19)
- Bhutan (4)
- India (90)
- Maldives (56)
- Nepal (36)
- Pakistan (56)
- Sri Lanka (110)

== Schedule ==
This is the schedule of events for the 2011 South Asian Beach Games.

OC	Opening ceremony	●	Event competitions	1	Event finals	CC	Closing ceremony

October	8th Sat	9th Sun	10th Mon	11th Tue	12th Wed	13th Thu	14th Fri	Events
Ceremonies	OC						CC	
3-on-3 basketball		●	●	2				2
Beach football	●	●	1					1
Beach handball				●	●	1		1
Beach kabbadi		●	●	2				2
Beach netball					●	●	1	1
Beach volleyball		●	●	●	●	2		2
Lifesaving				3	3			6
Marathon swimming			2					2
Tent pegging		2	2		2	2		8
Windsurfing		●	●	●	1			1
Total Events		2	5	7	6	5	1	26
Cumulative total		2	7	14	20	25	26	
October	8th Sat	9th Sun	10th Mon	11th Tue	12th Wed	13th Thu	14th Fri	Events

== Medal table ==
* Host nation (Sri Lanka)

Rank	Nation	Gold	Silver	Bronze	Total
1	India (IND)	11	9	7	27
2	Sri Lanka (SRI)*	9	10	9	28
3	Pakistan (PAK)	5	2	4	11
4	Nepal (NEP)	1	2	5	8
5	Bangladesh (BAN)	1	1	1	3
6	Maldives (MDV)	0	1	2	3
7	Afghanistan (AFG)	0	1	0	1
8	Bhutan (BHU)	0	0	0	0
Totals (8 entries)		27	26	28	81
