= 1984 South Asian Games =

I South Asian Games
- Stamped logo of the tournament
- Host city: Kathmandu
- Country: Nepal
- Nations: 7
- Athletes: 373
- Events: 62 Events in 5 sports
- Opening: 17 September
- Closing: 23 September
- Opened by: Birendra, King of Nepal
- Main venue: Dasarath Stadium

The 1984 South Asian Games (or 1st SAF Games) was the first edition of South Asian Games. It was held in Kathmandu, Nepal from 17 to 23 September 1984.

The number of disciplines were restricted to five only. India topped the medal tally, winning 88 medals. Half of these medals were golds. There were 28 silvers and 16 bronze medals won by India. Sri Lanka followed India by winning 7 golds, 11 silvers and 19 bronze medals whereas Pakistan got 5 golds, 3 silvers and 2 bronze medals. As the games were held for the first time, all the gold medalists created new games records which were shattered in the subsequent editions. However, the two records created in swimming remain intact till date. Bula Choudhary of India won the 100-metre freestyle event clocking 1:2:81 whereas the Indian relay team won the 4x100 metre freestyle event which continue to find place in the record books. Football was the only team game which could fit into the scheme of the games. Its gold was claimed by Nepal. Majesty King Birendra Bir Bikram Shah Dev declared the first South Asian Federation Games open amidst at colorful ceremony.

== Venue ==
Dasarath Stadium, Kathmandu hosted all events of 5 sports.

== The Games ==
=== Participating nations ===
Seven countries competed. A total of 373 athletes competed.

- Bangladesh (53 athletes)
- Bhutan (35)
- India (98)
- Maldives (24)
- Nepal (105)
- Pakistan (16)
- Sri Lanka (41)

=== Sports ===
There were 5 official sports for the 1st SAF Games. They were :

- Athletics
- Boxing
- Football
- Swimming
- Weightlifting

== Medal tally ==
* Host nation (Nepal)

Medal Tally
Rank	Nation	Gold	Silver	Bronze	Total
1	India	44	28	16	88
2	Sri Lanka	7	11	19	37
3	Pakistan	5	3	2	10
4	Nepal*	4	12	8	24
5	Bangladesh	2	8	13	23
6	Bhutan	0	0	2	2
7	Maldives	0	0	1	1
Totals (7 entries)		62	62	61	185
