= 2027 South Asian Games =

XIV South Asian Games 2027

- Host city: Islamabad; Lahore; Peshawar
- Country: Pakistan
- Organizer: South Asia Olympic Council
- Nations: 7
- Athletes: 4,200 athletes
- Events: 28 sports with 8 sports debut (38 sports)
- Opening: 3 April 2027
- Closing: 11 April 2027
- Opened by: Asif Ali Zardari
- Torch lighter: TBA
- Main venue: Jinnah Sports Stadium; Punjab Stadium; Qayyum Stadium
- Venues: Pakistan Sports Complex; Nishtar Park Sports Complex; Peshawar Sports Complex
- Website: TBA

The 2027 South Asian Games, officially the XIV South Asian Games, is an upcoming international multi-sport event sanctioned by the South Asia Olympic Council. It is scheduled to take place from 3 to 11 April 2027 in Islamabad, Lahore and Peshawar, Pakistan. Originally slated for March 2023, the Games were postponed to March 2024 and January 2026, before being rescheduled for April 2027.

This will mark the third time that Pakistan has hosted the South Asian Games following the 1989 and 2004 editions, and the first time outside of Islamabad.

== Host selection ==
In 2019, the Sri Lankan Ministry of Sports announced that Sri Lanka had bid in a partnership with the Maldives. However, Pakistan was announced as host by the South Asian Olympic Council in December 2019. On 10 December, POA President Arif Hassan received the games flag.

== Venues ==
Three different cities in Pakistan will host the competition: Islamabad, Lahore and Peshawar.

=== Islamabad ===
Venue	Sport(s)
Jinnah Sports Stadium	Athletics
Jinnah Sports Stadium	Football
Pakistan Sports Complex	Basketball
Pakistan Sports Complex	Badminton
Pakistan Sports Complex	Table Tennis
Pakistan Sports Complex	Kabaddi
Pakistan Sports Complex	Karate
Pakistan Sports Complex	Weightlifting
Pakistan Sports Complex	Wushu
PTF Tennis Complex	Tennis
The Centaurus	Billiards & Snooker
TBA	Shooting
Rawal Lake	Rowing
TBA	Triathlon
TBA	Squash

=== Lahore ===
Venue	Sport(s)
Nishtar Park Sports Complex	Wrestling
Nishtar Park Sports Complex	Taekwondo
Nishtar Park Sports Complex	Fencing
International Boxing Arena	Boxing
Gaddafi Stadium	Cricket
Punjab Stadium	Handball
Punjab Stadium	Rugby
TBA	Golf
National Hockey Stadium	Hockey
Punjab International Swimming Complex	Swimming

=== Peshawar ===
Venue	Sport(s)
Peshawar Sports Complex	Archery
Peshawar Sports Complex	Judo
Peshawar Sports Complex	Volleyball

== Background ==
It was reported that the Government of Pakistan designated around Rs 2 billion for infrastructure. In July 2020, it was announced that the federal government had set forth more than Rs 3.5 billion for the South Asian Games.

The Pakistan Olympic Association wanted to base the games in Lahore, while Gujranwala was being considered for weightlifting and wrestling competitions while Sialkot and Narowal for volleyball. Faisalabad was under consideration for handball while along with it, Gojra was under consideration for field hockey. Kasur was also one of the proposed venues. It was also reported that the POA intended to organise the football competition in Karachi, Sindh. In May 2020, Mardan, Khyber Pakhtunkhwa, expressed hosting events at a gymnasium, despite not being a host city. Syed Aqil Shah, President of the Khyber Pakhtunkhwa Olympic Association requested that the POA should include Peshawar as one of the host cities for the Games.

On 11 January 2021, Prime Minister Imran Khan gave a go-ahead signal to the Pakistan Olympic Association and the Federal Sports Ministry to host the Games. On 15 January 2021, POA President Syed Arif Hasan further said that the venues have almost been finalised and in the next meeting with the federal sports minister on 18 January in Islamabad, several other key decisions would be taken with respect to holding the Games.

On 12 July 2021, it was confirmed that some events will be shared between Faisalabad, Gujranwala, Islamabad and Sialkot. On 11 February 2022, it was announced that the government wanted the opening ceremony and closing ceremonies in Islamabad and Lahore, respectively, and for football competitions to be held in Lahore. Some sources also stated Karachi as sub host city. On 13 February 2022, the government announced plans to hold the event by March 2023 in Lahore, Faisalabad and Islamabad.

The Games were postponed to March 2024, and later January 2026, before being rescheduled for March 2027. In July 2026, KP Governor Faisal Karim Kundi publicly complained about Khyber Pakhtunkhwa being excluded from the 2027 South Asian Games. On 23 August 2026, the dates were moved to 3 to 11 April 2027, with Peshawar replacing Faisalabad as one of the host cities.

== The Games ==
=== Participating nations ===
Seven countries are expected to compete.

- Bangladesh
- Bhutan
- India
- Maldives
- Nepal
- Pakistan (H)
- Sri Lanka

=== Sports ===
Debuting sports include diving, water polo, chess, esports, lacrosse, gymnastics, cycling, equestrian, baseball and Cue sports.

- Archery
- Athletics
- Badminton
- Baseball
- Basketball
- Basketball 3x3
- Billiard
- Boxing
- Chess
- Cricket
- Cycling
- Diving
- Golf
- Fencing
- Field hockey
- Football
- Equestrian
- Esports
- Gymnastics
- Handball
- Judo
- Kabaddi
- Karate
- Lacrosse
- Rowing
- Rugby union
- Shooting
- Snooker
- Squash
- Swimming
- Table tennis
- Taekwondo
- Tennis
- Triathlon
- Volleyball
- Water polo
- Weightlifting
- Wrestling
- Wushu

== See also ==
- South Asian Games celebrated in Pakistan
  - 1989 South Asian Games – Islamabad
  - 2004 South Asian Games – Islamabad
  - 2027 South Asian Games – Islamabad, Lahore, Peshawar
- South Asian Games
- 2027 SEA Games
- 2027 BIMSTEC Games
