= 1989 South Asian Games =

IV South Asian Games
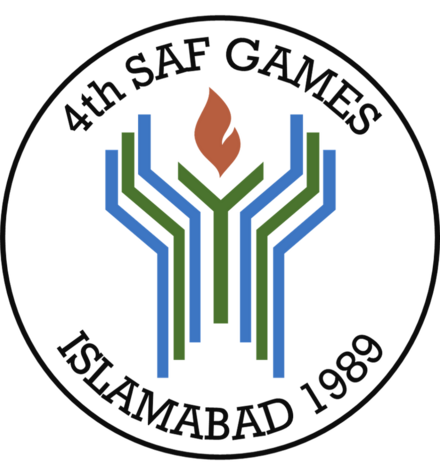
- Host city: Islamabad, Pakistan
- Nations: 7
- Events: 10 Sports
- Opening: 20 October
- Closing: 28 October
- Opened by: Ghulam Ishaq Khan, President of Pakistan
- Main venue: Jinnah Stadium
- Website: 1989 Islamabad

The 1989 South Asian Games, officially the IV South Asian Federation Games, were held in Islamabad, Pakistan from 20 October to 28 October 1989. Muhammad Ali appeared as a special guest at the closing ceremony.

== The Games ==
=== Participating nations ===
Seven countries competed.

- Bangladesh
- Bhutan
- India
- Maldives
- Nepal
- Pakistan
- Sri Lanka

=== Sports ===
Squash was introduced for the first time in 1989 games. It replaced basketball from the previous games.

- Aquatics
- Athletics
- Boxing
- Football
- Kabaddi (Circle style)
- Squash (debut)
- Swimming
- Table tennis
- Volleyball
- Weightlifting
- Wrestling

== Medal tally ==
Host nation Pakistan finished in 2nd place with a total of 97 medals (42 gold, 33 silver, and 22 bronze).

* Host nation (Pakistan)

Rank	Nation	Gold	Silver	Bronze	Total
1	India	61	43	20	124
2	Pakistan*	42	33	22	97
3	Sri Lanka	6	10	21	37
4	Nepal	1	13	32	46
5	Bangladesh	1	12	24	37
6	Bhutan	0	0	3	3
7	Maldives	0	0	0	0
Totals (7 entries)		111	111	122	344

== See also ==
- South Asian Games celebrated in Pakistan
  - 1989 South Asian Games – Islamabad
  - 2004 South Asian Games – Islamabad
  - 2027 South Asian Games – Islamabad, Lahore, Peshawar
- South Asian Games
