= 2011 South Asian Winter Games =

International multi-sport event

I South Asian Winter Games
- Host city: Dehradun and Auli, India
- Nations: 7
- Athletes: 150
- Events: 19 events in 4 sports
- Opening: 10 January 2011
- Closing: 16 January 2011
- Opened by: Pratibha Patil (President of India)
- Main venue: Dehradun (RSC Arena), Auli (GMVNL Ski Resort)

Summer

The 2011 South Asian Winter Games, officially the 1st South Asian Winter Games, were held in Dehradun and Auli, in the Himalayan state of Uttarakhand, India in January 2011. The games were conducted by the Indian Olympic Association and the Winter Games Federation of India. A grand opening and closing ceremony took place on 10 January 2011 and 16 January 2011, in Dehradun and Auli, respectively.

The Ice skating and Ice hockey events were conducted from 10 to 12 January 2011 in Dehradun while the Skiing and Snowboarding events were held from 14 to 16 January 2011 at Auli.

== Infrastructure (Games Related) ==
At Dehradun a facility has been created at Raipur Sports College. The Ice skating and Ice hockey arena has a seating capacity of 2,000 and the ice skating rink area is 60M by 30M, in which about 100 to 150 persons can skate every hour. It also has an Olympic size (50 by 25 Meters) fully air conditioned swimming pool, basketball courts and a cafeteria inside the complex. The central government had sanctioned ₹1.5 Billion for constructing this facility.

Auli is a destination for skiing and snowboarding. The skiing facility at Auli has ski slopes, artificial snow making system, water storage for artificial snow making system, chair lift system for ski sport and a residential accommodation complex. For the event, most of the works, including the ice making facility were put in place and there were 230 guest rooms that were built for the athletes and officials. The season at Auli has now been extended by creating artificial ice from a captive snow plant.

== Infrastructure (General) ==
The new Passenger Terminal Building at the Jolly Grant Airport at Dehradun is now fully operational. The installation of Night Landing System (NLS) and Instrument landing System (ILS) was completed and the lights, too, were installed on the runway to facilitate night landing. The main runway was extended by The Airports Authority of India, to 7000 ft to facilitate the landing of bigger aircraft such as the Airbus A320 and Boeing 727. The helipad at Auli was reconstructed to ensure regular chopper services from Jolly Grant Airport. These services were used to ferry athletes and officials during the event.

== Mascot ==
The official mascot for the first South Asian Winter Games was the Bharal, the Himalayan Blue-Sheep or Big-Horn (Ovis Ammon) Wild Sheep is the native of Central Asia and the Himalayas. The Bharal was chosen as the ideal mascot for these games keeping in view its agility, strength, sure-footed nature and adaptability for survival in the snow-covered high altitude areas. The male has massive wrinkled horns up to 70 inches in length which forms a spiral, while the horns of the female are much smaller. It weighs around a quintal and stands about 42 inches at the shoulder. Nanda Devi National Park in Uttarakhand is the famous abode of this brownish grey Himalayan Big-Horn called Bharal.

== Medal table ==
* Host nation (India)

Rank	Nation	Gold	Silver	Bronze	Total
1	India*	11	10	12	33
2	Pakistan	1	3	1	5
3	Sri Lanka	1	0	0	1
Totals (3 entries)		13	13	13	39

== The Games ==
=== Participating nations ===
Afghanistan did not participate.

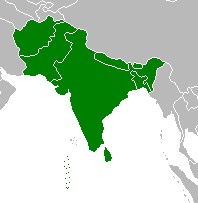
Participating nations.

- Bangladesh (2)
- Bhutan (10)
- India (95)
- Maldives (7)
- Nepal (8)
- Pakistan (22)
- Sri Lanka (1)

=== Sports ===
Four winter sports events were included in the 2011 South Asian Winter Games. Alpine skiing consisted of slalom, giant slalom and Super G with both men's and women's events. Cross-country skiing consisted of three events for men – 10 km, 15 km and a 4x10km relay, while the women's event consisted of a 3 km, 5 km and a 10 km. Snowboarding had a slalom and giant slalom with events for both men and women. Skating events included short track speed skating for men and women.

Skiing and Snowboarding events were held at the Auli GMVNL Ski Resort, Auli while the Skating and Ice Hockey events were held at Dehradun RSC Arena, Dehradun.

The figure in brackets indicates the number of events

- Alpine skiing (4)
- Cross-country skiing (5)
- Snowboarding (4)
- Short track speed skating (5)

Demonstration event

- Ice hockey (1)
- Figure skating (4) *Was scheduled to be a medal event, but only India had entered the competition, so it became a demonstration event.

== See also ==
- South Asian Games
