= 1987 South Asian Games =

III South Asian Games
- Host city: Kolkata, India
- Nations: 7
- Events: Medal sports: 10; Demonstration sport: 1
- Opening: 20 November
- Closing: 27 November
- Opened by: R. Venkataraman; President of India
- Main venue: Salt Lake Stadium

The 1987 South Asian Games, officially the 3rd South Asian Federation Games were a multi-sport event, held in Kolkata, India from 20 November to 27 November 1987. It was the largest sporting event ever to be held in Kolkata, and West Bengal as a whole. This was also the first time India hosted these Games.

The games were opened by Indian president R. Venkataraman and the Games Flame was carried by Indian runner Milkha Singh, with Leslie Claudius lighting the flame.

A total of 10 disciplines were contested in these Games. India was the major medal winner at these events, garnering approximately 43% of all the medals. Seven nations participated in these Games.

== Sports ==
Medal sports (10)

- Athletics
- Basketball (debut)
- Boxing
- Football
- Kabaddi
- Swimming
- Table tennis (debut)
- Volleyball (debut)
- Weightlifting
- Wrestling

Demonstration sport (1)

- Kho kho

== Medal tally ==
* Host nation (India)

Rank	Nation	Gold	Silver	Bronze	Total
1	India*	91	45	19	155
2	Pakistan	16	36	14	66
3	Sri Lanka	4	7	23	34
4	Bangladesh	3	20	31	54
5	Nepal	2	7	33	42
6	Bhutan	0	1	5	6
7	Maldives	0	0	0	0
Totals (7 entries)		116	116	125	357
