= 1985 South Asian Games =

II South Asian Games
- Host city: Dhaka, Bangladesh
- Nations: 7
- Athletes: –
- Events: 7 sports
- Opening: 20 December
- Closing: 26 December
- Opened by: Hussain Muhammad Ershad, President of Bangladesh
- Main venue: Bangabandhu National Stadium

The 1985 South Asian Games (or 2nd SAF Games) were held in Dhaka, Bangladesh from 20 December to 26 December 1985.

== Participating nations ==
A total of 7 countries participated in the 1985 South Asian Games.

- Bangladesh
- Bhutan
- India
- Maldives
- Nepal
- Pakistan
- Sri Lanka

== Sports ==
There were 7 official sports for the 2nd SAF Games. They were:

- Athletics
- Boxing
- Football
- Kabaddi (debut)
- Swimming
- Weightlifting
- Wrestling (debut)

Kabaddi and Wrestling were included for the first time during the 1987 games.

== Medal tally ==
* Host nation (Bangladesh)

Rank	Nation	Gold	Silver	Bronze	Total
1	India	61	32	14	107
2	Pakistan	21	26	12	59
3	Bangladesh*	9	17	38	64
4	Sri Lanka	2	7	9	18
5	Nepal	1	9	22	32
6	Bhutan	0	0	4	4
7	Maldives	0	0	0	0
Totals (7 entries)		94	91	99	284
