= 2008 European Men's Team Badminton Championships group stage =

This article lists the full results for group stage of 2008 European Men's Team Badminton Championships. The group stage was held from 12 to 14 February 2008.

== Group A ==
Pos	Team	Pld	W	L	MF	MA	MD	GF	GA	GD	PF	PA	PD	Pts	Qualification	Denmark	Scotland	Israel
1	Denmark	2	2	0	9	1	+8	18	3	+15	432	283	+149	2	Knockout stage	—	4–1	5–0
2	Scotland	2	1	1	5	5	0	12	10	+2	403	387	+16	1			—	
3	Israel	2	0	2	1	9	−8	2	19	−17	268	433	−165	0			1–4	—

Source: BWF

=== Denmark vs. Israel ===
Denmark
5
Topsportcentrum Almere, Court 8
12 February 2008, 10:00 UTC+1

Israel
0

			1	2	3
1	(Denmark) (Israel)	Joachim Persson; Misha Zilberman	21; 15	21; 7
2	(Denmark) (Israel)	Jan Ø. Jørgensen; Shai Geffen	21; 12	21; 9
3	(Denmark) (Israel)	Hans-Kristian Vittinghus; Aviv Sade	21; 7	21; 6
4	(Denmark) (Israel)	Jan Ø. Jørgensen / Joachim Fischer Nielsen; Alexander Bass / Nir Yusim	21; 11	21; 10
5	(Denmark) (Israel)	Mathias Boe / Hans-Kristian Vittinghus; Shai Geffen / Misha Zilberman	21; 10	21; 16

=== Israel vs. Scotland ===
Israel
1
Topsportcentrum Almere, Court 4
13 February 2008, 13:00 UTC+1

Scotland
4

			1	2	3
1	(Israel) (Scotland)	Misha Zilberman; Craig Goddard	21; 16	17; 21	21; 18
2	(Israel) (Scotland)	Shai Geffen; Stuart Gilliland	16; 21	15; 21
3	(Israel) (Scotland)	Alexander Bass; Gordon Thomson	13; 21	16; 21
4	(Israel) (Scotland)	Shai Geffen / Misha Zilberman; Watson Briggs / Thomas Bethell	8; 21	14; 21
5	(Israel) (Scotland)	Alexander Bass / Nir Yusim; Andrew Bowman / David Gilmour	13; 21	11; 21

=== Denmark vs. Scotland ===
Denmark
4
Topsportcentrum Almere, Court 1
14 February 2008, 13:00 UTC+1

Scotland
1

			1	2	3
1	(Denmark) (Scotland)	Joachim Persson; Craig Goddard	22; 20	19; 21	21; 13
2	(Denmark) (Scotland)	Jens Eriksen / Martin Lundgaard Hansen; Thomas Bethell / Watson Briggs	21; 13	21; 15
3	(Denmark) (Scotland)	Jan Ø. Jørgensen; Stuart Gilliland	21; 18	21; 17
4	(Denmark) (Scotland)	Mathias Boe / Joachim Fischer Nielsen; Andrew Bowman / David Gilmour	21; 7	21; 13
5	(Denmark) (Scotland)	Hans-Kristian Vittinghus; Gordon Thomson	14; 21	20; 22

== Group B ==
Pos	Team	Pld	W	L	MF	MA	MD	GF	GA	GD	PF	PA	PD	Pts	Qualification	England	Finland	Lithuania
1	England	2	2	0	9	1	+8	18	4	+14	453	291	+162	2	Knockout stage	—	5–0	4–1
2	Finland	2	1	1	4	6	−2	10	12	−2	372	390	−18	1			—	
3	Lithuania	2	0	2	2	8	−6	4	16	−12	251	395	−144	0			1–4	—

Source: BWF

=== England vs. Lithuania ===
England
4
Topsportcentrum Almere, Court 5
12 February 2008, 18:00 UTC+1

Lithuania
1

			1	2	3
1	(England) (Lithuania)	Andrew Smith; Kęstutis Navickas	18; 21	16; 21
2	(England) (Lithuania)	Rajiv Ouseph; Donatas Narvilas	21; 10	21; 11
3	(England) (Lithuania)	Aamir Ghaffar; Ramūnas Stapušaitis	21; 16	21; 7
4	(England) (Lithuania)	Anthony Clark / David Lindley; Donatas Narvilas / Kęstutis Navickas	21; 7	21; 11
5	(England) (Lithuania)	Chris Adcock / Nathan Robertson; Klaudijus Kasinskas / Ramūnas Stapušaitis	21; 4	21; 4

=== Lithuania vs. Finland ===
Lithuania
1
Topsportcentrum Almere, Court 4
13 February 2008, 14:00 UTC+1

Finland
4

			1	2	3
1	(Lithuania) (Finland)	Kęstutis Navickas; Ville Lång	21; 12	21; 13
2	(Lithuania) (Finland)	Ramūnas Stapušaitis; Markus Heikkinen	10; 21	6; 21
3	(Lithuania) (Finland)	Klaudijus Kasinskas; Antti Viitikko	10; 21	12; 21
4	(Lithuania) (Finland)	Donatas Narvilas / Kęstutis Navickas; Tuomas Palmqvist / Mikko Vikman	18; 21	18; 21
5	(Lithuania) (Finland)	Klaudijus Kasinskas / Ramūnas Stapušaitis; Ville Lång / Antti Viitikko	12; 21	11; 21

=== England vs. Finland ===
England
5
Topsportcentrum Almere, Court 1
14 February 2008, 10:00 UTC+1

Finland
0

			1	2	3
1	(England) (Finland)	Andrew Smith; Ville Lång	23; 25	21; 19	21; 11
2	(England) (Finland)	Rajiv Ouseph; Markus Heikkinen	21; 14	21; 13
3	(England) (Finland)	Aamir Ghaffar; Antti Viitikko	22; 20	17; 21	21; 16
4	(England) (Finland)	David Lindley / Anthony Clark; Tuomas Palmqvist / Mikko Vikman	21; 12	21; 13
5	(England) (Finland)	Robert Blair / Chris Adcock; Ville Lång / Antti Viitikko	21; 9	21; 6

== Group C ==
Pos	Team	Pld	W	L	MF	MA	MD	GF	GA	GD	PF	PA	PD	Pts	Qualification	Germany	Estonia	Hungary	Norway
1	Germany	3	3	0	15	0	+15	30	2	+28	667	398	+269	3	Knockout stage	—	5–0	5–0	5–0
2	Estonia	3	2	1	6	9	−3	16	19	−3	593	663	−70	2			—	3–2	3–2
3	Hungary	3	1	2	5	10	−5	11	22	−11	513	598	−85	1				—	3–2
4	Norway	3	0	3	4	11	−7	10	24	−14	537	651	−114	0					—

Source: BWF

=== Germany vs. Norway ===
Germany
5
Topsportcentrum Almere, Court 3
12 February 2008, 10:00 UTC+1

Norway
0

			1	2	3
1	(Germany) (Norway)	Björn Joppien; Steinar Klausen	21; 14	21; 16
2	(Germany) (Norway)	Sven Eric Kastens; Hallstein Oma	18; 21	21; 15	21; 10
3	(Germany) (Norway)	Tim Dettmann / Johannes Schöttler; Jonas Christensen / Erik Rundle	21; 7	21; 11
4	(Germany) (Norway)	Dieter Domke; Philip Aarhus	21; 8	21; 13
5	(Germany) (Norway)	Kristof Hopp / Ingo Kindervater; Steinar Klausen / Hallstein Oma	21; 7	21; 19

=== Estonia vs. Hungary ===
Estonia
3
Topsportcentrum Almere, Court 4
12 February 2008, 10:00 UTC+1

Hungary
2

			1	2	3
1	(Estonia) (Hungary)	Raul Must; Kristóf Horváth	22; 20	21; 11
2	(Estonia) (Hungary)	Indrek Kuuts / Meelis Maiste; Attila Kaposi / Henrik Tóth	22; 20	13; 21	21; 19
3	(Estonia) (Hungary)	Tauno Tooming; Henrik Tóth	18; 21	13; 21
4	(Estonia) (Hungary)	Rainer Kaljumäe / Ants Mängel; Kristóf Horváth / Ádám Pusztai	21; 13	21; 9
5	(Estonia) (Hungary)	Rainer Kaljumäe; Attila Kaposi	11; 21	10; 21

=== Norway vs. Hungary ===
Norway
2
Topsportcentrum Almere, Court 5
13 February 2008, 10:00 UTC+1

Hungary
3

			1	2	3
1	(Norway) (Hungary)	Steinar Klausen; Kristóf Horváth	21; 13	21; 13
2	(Norway) (Hungary)	Hallstein Oma; Henrik Tóth	11; 21	21; 11	5; 21
3	(Norway) (Hungary)	Marius Myhre; Attila Kaposi	17; 21	19; 21
4	(Norway) (Hungary)	Steinar Klausen / Hallstein Oma; Kristóf Horváth / Ádám Pusztai	21; 16	21; 13
5	(Norway) (Hungary)	Jonas Christensen / Erik Rundle; Henrik Tóth / Attila Kaposi	7; 21	10; 21

=== Germany vs. Estonia ===
Germany
5
Topsportcentrum Almere, Court 8
13 February 2008, 10:00 UTC+1

Estonia
0

			1	2	3
1	(Germany) (Estonia)	Marc Zwiebler; Raul Must	19; 21	21; 18	21; 14
2	(Germany) (Estonia)	Sven Eric Kastens; Tauno Tooming	21; 8	21; 11
3	(Germany) (Estonia)	Dieter Domke; Rainer Kaljumäe	21; 12	21; 12
4	(Germany) (Estonia)	Tim Dettmann / Johannes Schöttler; Indrek Kuuts / Meelis Maiste	21; 10	21; 13
5	(Germany) (Estonia)	Michael Fuchs / Roman Spitko; Rainer Kaljumäe / Ants Mängel	21; 19	21; 14

=== Norway vs. Estonia ===
Norway
2
Topsportcentrum Almere, Court 5
14 February 2008, 14:00 UTC+1

Estonia
3

			1	2	3
1	(Norway) (Estonia)	Steinar Klausen; Raul Must	18; 21	15; 21
2	(Norway) (Estonia)	Hallstein Oma; Tauno Tooming	18; 21	21; 5	23; 21
3	(Norway) (Estonia)	Marius Myhre; Rainer Kaljumäe	17; 21	15; 21
4	(Norway) (Estonia)	Steinar Klausen / Hallstein Oma; Rainer Kaljumäe / Ants Mängel	24; 26	21; 10	24; 22
5	(Norway) (Estonia)	Jonas Christensen / Marius Myhre; Indrek Kuuts / Meelis Maiste	14; 21	12; 21

=== Germany vs. Hungary ===
Germany
5
Topsportcentrum Almere, Court 7
14 February 2008, 18:00 UTC+1

Hungary
0

			1	2	3
1	(Germany) (Hungary)	Björn Joppien; Kristóf Horváth	21; 10	21; 13
2	(Germany) (Hungary)	Roman Spitko; Henrik Tóth	21; 14	21; 16
3	(Germany) (Hungary)	Dieter Domke; Ádám Pusztai	21; 9	21; 1
4	(Germany) (Hungary)	Michael Fuchs / Kristof Hopp; Kristóf Horváth / Henrik Tóth	21; 9	21; 13
5	(Germany) (Hungary)	Johannes Schöttler / Roman Spitko; Attila Kaposi / Ádám Pusztai	21; 11	21; 13

== Group D ==
Pos	Team	Pld	W	L	MF	MA	MD	GF	GA	GD	PF	PA	PD	Pts	Qualification	Poland	Portugal	Bulgaria	Belgium
1	Poland	3	3	0	12	3	+9	24	8	+16	635	492	+143	3	Knockout stage	—	3–2	4–1	5–0
2	Portugal	3	1	2	7	8	−1	16	17	−1	542	608	−66	1			—	3–2	2–3
3	Bulgaria	3	1	2	6	9	−3	13	18	−5	543	576	−33	1				—	3–2
4	Belgium	3	1	2	5	10	−5	12	22	−10	581	625	−44	1					—

Source: BWF

=== Poland vs. Bulgaria ===
Poland
4
Topsportcentrum Almere, Court 9
12 February 2008, 10:00 UTC+1

Bulgaria
1

			1	2	3
1	(Poland) (Bulgaria)	Przemysław Wacha; Krasimir Jankov	21; 12	21; 15
2	(Poland) (Bulgaria)	Michał Łogosz / Robert Mateusiak; Stiliyan Makarski / Vladimir Metodiev	21; 5	21; 13
3	(Poland) (Bulgaria)	Maciej Kowalik; Blagovest Kisyov	12; 21	14; 21
4	(Poland) (Bulgaria)	Adam Cwalina / Wojciech Szkudlarczyk; Konstantin Dobrev / Julian Hristov	21; 15	23; 21
5	(Poland) (Bulgaria)	Hubert Pączek; Boris Kessov	21; 18	21; 17

=== Belgium vs. Portugal ===
Belgium
3
Topsportcentrum Almere, Court 7
12 February 2008, 10:00 UTC+1

Portugal
2

			1	2	3
1	(Belgium) (Portugal)	Yuhan Tan; Marco Vasconcelos	18; 21	21; 8	21; 15
2	(Belgium) (Portugal)	Frédéric Gaspard; Alexandre Paixão	8; 21	13; 21
3	(Belgium) (Portugal)	Lionel Warnotte; Pedro Martins	20; 22	13; 21
4	(Belgium) (Portugal)	Wouter Claes / Frédéric Mawet; Alexandre Paixão / Marco Vasconcelos	21; 10	21; 12
5	(Belgium) (Portugal)	Frédéric Gaspard / Jonathan Gillis; Miguel Jardim / Pedro Martins	21; 15	18; 21	21; 6

=== Poland vs. Belgium ===
Poland
5
Topsportcentrum Almere, Court 2
13 February 2008, 10:00 UTC+1

Belgium
0

			1	2	3
1	(Poland) (Belgium)	Przemysław Wacha; Yuhan Tan	11; 21	24; 22	21; 9
2	(Poland) (Belgium)	Michał Łogosz / Robert Mateusiak; Wouter Claes / Frédéric Mawet	19; 21	21; 17	21; 9
3	(Poland) (Belgium)	Adam Cwalina; Frédéric Gaspard	21; 13	21; 17
4	(Poland) (Belgium)	Łukasz Moreń / Wojciech Szkudlarczyk; Elie Balligand / Jonathan Gillis	21; 19	19; 21	21; 9
5	(Poland) (Belgium)	Hubert Pączek; Lionel Warnotte	21; 13	21; 15

=== Bulgaria vs. Portugal ===
Bulgaria
2
Topsportcentrum Almere, Court 6
13 February 2008, 14:00 UTC+1

Portugal
3

			1	2	3
1	(Bulgaria) (Portugal)	Krasimir Jankov; Marco Vasconcelos	12; 21	15; 21
2	(Bulgaria) (Portugal)	Blagovest Kisyov; Alexandre Paixão	11; 21	17; 21
3	(Bulgaria) (Portugal)	Boris Kessov; Pedro Martins	22; 20	21; 17
4	(Bulgaria) (Portugal)	Konstantin Dobrev / Julian Hristov; Nuno Santos / Marco Vasconcelos	21; 10	21; 7
5	(Bulgaria) (Portugal)	Stiliyan Makarski / Vladimir Metodiev; Pedro Martins / Alexandre Paixão	16; 21	22; 20	18; 21

=== Poland vs. Portugal ===
Poland
3
Topsportcentrum Almere, Court 4
14 February 2008, 10:00 UTC+1

Portugal
2

			1	2	3
1	(Poland) (Portugal)	Przemysław Wacha; Marco Vasconcelos	21; 14	21; 12
2	(Poland) (Portugal)	Maciej Kowalik; Alexandre Paixão	17; 21	11; 21
3	(Poland) (Portugal)	Hubert Pączek; Pedro Martins	21; 23	21; 23
4	(Poland) (Portugal)	Adam Cwalina / Michał Łogosz; Nuno Santos / Marco Vasconcelos	21; 11	16; 8
5	(Poland) (Portugal)	Maciej Kowalik / Hubert Pączek; Pedro Martins / Alexandre Paixão	21; 9	21; 7

=== Bulgaria vs. Belgium ===
Bulgaria
3
Topsportcentrum Almere, Court 4
14 February 2008, 14:00 UTC+1

Belgium
2

			1	2	3
1	(Bulgaria) (Belgium)	Blagovest Kisyov; Yuhan Tan	8; 21	22; 24
2	(Bulgaria) (Belgium)	Stiliyan Makarski; Frédéric Gaspard	21; 18	23; 21
3	(Bulgaria) (Belgium)	Boris Kessov; Elie Balligand	21; 16	21; 15
4	(Bulgaria) (Belgium)	Stiliyan Makarski / Vladimir Metodiev; Frédéric Mawet / Wouter Claes	11; 21	20; 22
5	(Bulgaria) (Belgium)	Konstantin Dobrev / Julian Hristov; Frédéric Gaspard / Jonathan Gillis	21; 8	21; 14

== Group E ==
Pos	Team	Pld	W	L	MF	MA	MD	GF	GA	GD	PF	PA	PD	Pts	Qualification	Sweden	France	Italy	Greece
1	Sweden	3	3	0	13	2	+11	26	5	+21	615	418	+197	3	Knockout stage	—	3–2	5–0	5–0
2	France	3	2	1	12	3	+9	24	7	+17	611	440	+171	2			—	5–0	5–0
3	Italy	3	1	2	5	10	−5	11	21	−10	509	589	−80	1				—	5–0
4	Greece	3	0	3	0	15	−15	2	30	−28	377	665	−288	0					—

Source: BWF

=== Italy vs. Sweden ===
Italy
0
Topsportcentrum Almere, Court 1
12 February 2008, 14:00 UTC+1

Sweden
5

			1	2	3
1	(Italy) (Sweden)	Klaus Raffeiner; Magnus Sahlberg	19; 21	14; 21
2	(Italy) (Sweden)	Giovanni Traina; Henri Hurskainen	7; 21	15; 21
3	(Italy) (Sweden)	Giovanni Greco; Mattias Wigardt	6; 21	13; 21
4	(Italy) (Sweden)	Enrico Galeani / Rosario Maddaloni; Tim Foo / Magnus Sahlberg	12; 21	9; 21
5	(Italy) (Sweden)	Giovanni Greco / Pierluigi Musiari; Peder Nordin / Gabriel Ulldahl	21; 13	13; 21	19; 21

=== France vs. Greece ===
France
5
Topsportcentrum Almere, Court 1
12 February 2008, 18:00 UTC+1

Greece
0

			1	2	3
1	(France) (Greece)	Simon Maunoury; Georgios Charalambidis	21; 18	17; 21	21; 15
2	(France) (Greece)	Brice Leverdez; George Galvas	21; 10	21; 11
3	(France) (Greece)	Laurent Constantin / Sylvain Grosjean; Dimitris Chrisohoou / Ilias Xanthou	21; 8	21; 10
4	(France) (Greece)	Matthieu Lo Ying Ping; Dimitris Orlis	21; 11	21; 6
5	(France) (Greece)	Erwin Kehlhoffner / Svetoslav Stoyanov; Georgios Charalambidis / George Galvas	21; 9	21; 6

=== Greece vs. Sweden ===
Greece
0
Topsportcentrum Almere, Court 5
13 February 2008, 14:00 UTC+1

Sweden
5

			1	2	3
1	(Greece) (Sweden)	Georgios Charalambidis; Magnus Sahlberg	14; 21	19; 21
2	(Greece) (Sweden)	Dimitris Chrisohoou; Henri Hurskainen	14; 21	11; 21
3	(Greece) (Sweden)	Ilias Xanthou; Gabriel Ulldahl	5; 21	10; 21
4	(Greece) (Sweden)	Dimitris Chrisohoou / Dimitris Orlis; Peder Nordin / Mattias Wigardt	8; 21	5; 21
5	(Greece) (Sweden)	George Galvas / Ilias Xanthou; Henri Hurskainen / Tim Foo	10; 21	10; 21

=== France vs. Italy ===
France
5
Topsportcentrum Almere, Court 9
13 February 2008, 14:00 UTC+1

Italy
0

			1	2	3
1	(France) (Italy)	Simon Maunoury; Klaus Raffeiner	21; 17	21; 18
2	(France) (Italy)	Erwin Kehlhoffner; Giovanni Traina	21; 11	21; 10
3	(France) (Italy)	Brice Leverdez; Giovanni Greco	21; 15	21; 9
4	(France) (Italy)	Sylvain Grosjean / Svetoslav Stoyanov; Enrico Galeani / Rosario Maddaloni	21; 13	21; 15
5	(France) (Italy)	Baptiste Carême / Brice Leverdez; Giovanni Greco / Pierluigi Musiari	21; 13	21; 12

=== Greece vs. Italy ===
Greece
0
Topsportcentrum Almere, Court 6
14 February 2008, 10:00 UTC+1

Italy
5

			1	2	3
1	(Greece) (Italy)	Georgios Charalambidis; Klaus Raffeiner	11; 21	13; 21
2	(Greece) (Italy)	George Galvas; Giovanni Traina	8; 21	19; 21
3	(Greece) (Italy)	Dimitris Chrisohoou; Giovanni Greco	10; 21	13; 21
4	(Greece) (Italy)	Georgios Charalambidis / George Galvas; Enrico Galeani / Rosario Maddaloni	19; 21	16; 21
5	(Greece) (Italy)	Dimitris Chrisohoou / Ilias Xanthou; Giovanni Greco / Pierluigi Musiari	15; 21	21; 18	11; 21

=== France vs. Sweden ===
France
2
Topsportcentrum Almere, Court 9
14 February 2008, 10:00 UTC+1

Sweden
3

			1	2	3
1	(France) (Sweden)	Simon Maunoury; Magnus Sahlberg	10; 21	16; 21
2	(France) (Sweden)	Erwin Kehlhoffner; Henri Hurskainen	13; 21	13; 21
3	(France) (Sweden)	Brice Leverdez; Mattias Wigardt	22; 24	16; 21
4	(France) (Sweden)	Baptiste Carême / Erwin Kehlhoffner; Tim Foo / Gabriel Ulldahl	21; 9	21; 8
5	(France) (Sweden)	Brice Leverdez / Svetoslav Stoyanov; Henri Hurskainen / Magnus Sahlberg	21; 18	21; 18

== Group F ==
Pos	Team	Pld	W	L	MF	MA	MD	GF	GA	GD	PF	PA	PD	Pts	Qualification	Netherlands	Ukraine	Ireland	Slovakia
1	Netherlands (H)	3	3	0	14	1	+13	28	3	+25	652	464	+188	3	Knockout stage	—	5–0	5–0	5–0
2	Ukraine	3	2	1	9	6	+3	20	14	+6	627	594	+33	2			—	3–2	5–0
3	Ireland	3	1	2	5	10	−5	11	21	−10	548	594	−46	1				—	3–2
4	Slovakia	3	0	3	2	13	−11	6	27	−21	498	673	−175	0					—

Source: BWF
(H) Host

=== Netherlands vs. Slovakia ===
Netherlands
5
Topsportcentrum Almere, Court 3
12 February 2008, 14:00 UTC+1

Slovakia
0

			1	2	3
1	(Netherlands) (Slovakia)	Dicky Palyama; Michal Matejka	21; 12	21; 14
2	(Netherlands) (Slovakia)	Eric Pang; Vladimír Závada	21; 11	21; 14
3	(Netherlands) (Slovakia)	Rune Massing; Lukáš Klačanský	21; 17	21; 10
4	(Netherlands) (Slovakia)	Ruud Bosch / Koen Ridder; Vladimír Závada / Marián Smrek	21; 8	21; 18
5	(Netherlands) (Slovakia)	Jorrit de Ruiter / Jurgen Wouters; Lukáš Klačanský / Michal Matejka	21; 15	22; 20

=== Ireland vs. Ukraine ===
Ireland
2
Topsportcentrum Almere, Court 4
12 February 2008, 18:00 UTC+1

Ukraine
3

			1	2	3
1	(Republic of Ireland) (Ukraine)	Scott Evans; Vladislav Druzchenko	22; 20	17; 21	21; 19
2	(Republic of Ireland) (Ukraine)	Alexander Sim; Valeriy Atrashchenkov	10; 21	20; 22
3	(Republic of Ireland) (Ukraine)	Sam Magee; Dmitry Miznikov	13; 21	15; 21
4	(Republic of Ireland) (Ukraine)	Daniel Magee / Sam Magee; Valeriy Atrashchenkov / Dmitry Miznikov	21; 23	18; 21
5	(Republic of Ireland) (Ukraine)	Scott Evans / Matthew Gleave; Vitaly Konov / Dmytro Zavadsky				w/o

=== Netherlands vs. Ireland ===
Netherlands
5
Topsportcentrum Almere, Court 7
13 February 2008, 14:00 UTC+1

Ireland
0

			1	2	3
1	(Netherlands) (Republic of Ireland)	Dicky Palyama; Scott Evans	26; 24	21; 13
2	(Netherlands) (Republic of Ireland)	Eric Pang; Alexander Sim	21; 14	21; 7
3	(Netherlands) (Republic of Ireland)	Rune Massing; Daniel Magee	21; 7	21; 6
4	(Netherlands) (Republic of Ireland)	Ruud Bosch / Koen Ridder; Scott Evans / Sam Magee	21; 15	21; 17
5	(Netherlands) (Republic of Ireland)	Jorrit de Ruiter / Jurgen Wouters; Matthew Gleave / Daniel Magee	21; 14	21; 19

=== Slovakia vs. Ukraine ===
Slovakia
0
Topsportcentrum Almere, Court 5
13 February 2008, 18:00 UTC+1

Ukraine
5

			1	2	3
1	(Slovakia) (Ukraine)	Michal Matejka; Vladislav Druzchenko	22; 20	14; 21	9; 21
2	(Slovakia) (Ukraine)	Vladimír Závada; Dmytro Zavadsky	4; 21	18; 21
3	(Slovakia) (Ukraine)	Lukáš Klačanský; Valeriy Atrashchenkov	11; 21	21; 19	19; 21
4	(Slovakia) (Ukraine)	Vladimír Závada / Marián Smrek; Vitaly Konov / Dmytro Zavadsky	15; 21	7; 21
5	(Slovakia) (Ukraine)	Michal Matejka / Lukáš Klačanský; Valeriy Atrashchenkov / Dmitry Miznikov	15; 21	14; 21

=== Netherlands vs. Ukraine ===
Netherlands
4
Topsportcentrum Almere, Court 2
14 February 2008, 14:00 UTC+1

Ukraine
1

			1	2	3
1	(Netherlands) (Ukraine)	Dicky Palyama; Vladislav Druzchenko	26; 24	21; 19
2	(Netherlands) (Ukraine)	Eric Pang; Dmytro Zavadsky	21; 14	21; 14
3	(Netherlands) (Ukraine)	Ruud Bosch / Koen Ridder; Valeriy Atrashchenkov / Dmitry Miznikov	21; 9	21; 13
4	(Netherlands) (Ukraine)	Rune Massing; Vitaly Konov	21; 15	21; 23	21; 16
5	(Netherlands) (Ukraine)	Jorrit de Ruiter / Jurgen Wouters; Vladislav Druzchenko / Dmytro Zavadsky	17; 21	15; 21

=== Slovakia vs. Ireland ===
Slovakia
2
Topsportcentrum Almere, Court 6
14 February 2008, 14:00 UTC+1

Ireland
3

			1	2	3
1	(Slovakia) (Republic of Ireland)	Michal Matejka; Scott Evans	14; 21	12; 21
2	(Slovakia) (Republic of Ireland)	Vladimír Závada; Alexander Sim	17; 21	17; 21
3	(Slovakia) (Republic of Ireland)	Lukáš Klačanský; Daniel Magee	21; 12	21; 10
4	(Slovakia) (Republic of Ireland)	Vladimír Závada / Marián Smrek; Scott Evans / Sam Magee	11; 21	15; 21
5	(Slovakia) (Republic of Ireland)	Michal Matejka / Lukáš Klačanský; Daniel Magee / Matthew Gleave	24; 22	14; 21	24; 22

== Group G ==
Pos	Team	Pld	W	L	MF	MA	MD	GF	GA	GD	PF	PA	PD	Pts	Qualification	Russia	Spain	Iceland	Turkey
1	Russia	3	3	0	14	1	+13	29	6	+23	698	530	+168	3	Knockout stage	—	4–1	5–0	5–0
2	Spain	3	2	1	10	5	+5	22	12	+10	669	561	+108	2			—	4–1	5–0
3	Iceland	3	1	2	4	11	−7	11	24	−13	586	683	−97	1				—	3–2
4	Turkey	3	0	3	2	13	−11	6	26	−20	467	646	−179	0					—

Source: BWF

=== Turkey vs. Spain ===
Turkey
0
Topsportcentrum Almere, Court 7
12 February 2008, 14:00 UTC+1

Spain
5

			1	2	3
1	(Turkey) (Spain)	Hasan Hüseyin Durakcan; Pablo Abián	10; 21	13; 21
2	(Turkey) (Spain)	Ali Kaya; Carlos Longo	18; 21	13; 21
3	(Turkey) (Spain)	Mustafa Yalvarıcı; Nicolás Escartín	12; 21	15; 21
4	(Turkey) (Spain)	Hasan Hüseyin Durakcan / Ali Kaya; José Antonio Crespo / Rafael Fernández	13; 21	17; 21
5	(Turkey) (Spain)	Mustafa Yalvarıcı / Nuri Balkan; Nicolás Escartín / Carlos Longo	7; 21	17; 21

=== Russia vs. Iceland ===
Russia
5
Topsportcentrum Almere, Court 9
12 February 2008, 18:00 UTC+1

Iceland
0

			1	2	3
1	(Russia) (Iceland)	Stanislav Pukhov; Magnús Ingi Helgason	21; 14	21; 13
2	(Russia) (Iceland)	Ivan Sozonov; Atli Jóhannesson	21; 10	21; 6
3	(Russia) (Iceland)	Aleksandr Nikolaenko; Tryggvi Nielsen	21; 13	21; 11
4	(Russia) (Iceland)	Vitalij Durkin / Aleksandr Nikolaenko; Magnús Ingi Helgason / Helgi Jóhannesson	24; 22	16; 21	21; 16
5	(Russia) (Iceland)	Stanislav Pukhov / Ivan Sozonov; Atli Jóhannesson / Tryggvi Nielsen	21; 17	21; 15

=== Iceland vs. Spain ===
Iceland
1
Topsportcentrum Almere, Court 2
13 February 2008, 14:00 UTC+1

Spain
4

			1	2	3
1	(Iceland) (Spain)	Magnús Ingi Helgason; Pablo Abián	14; 21	13; 21
2	(Iceland) (Spain)	Tryggvi Nielsen; Carlos Longo	15; 21	17; 21
3	(Iceland) (Spain)	Helgi Jóhannesson; Nicolás Escartín	23; 21	8; 21	19; 21
4	(Iceland) (Spain)	Magnús Ingi Helgason / Helgi Jóhannesson; Pablo Abián / José Antonio Crespo	14; 21	15; 21
5	(Iceland) (Spain)	Atli Jóhannesson / Tryggvi Nielsen; Nicolás Escartín / Carlos Longo	21; 18	22; 20

=== Russia vs. Turkey ===
Russia
5
Topsportcentrum Almere, Court 1
13 February 2008, 14:00 UTC+1

Turkey
0

			1	2	3
1	(Russia) (Turkey)	Stanislav Pukhov; Hasan Hüseyin Durakcan	21; 12	21; 18
2	(Russia) (Turkey)	Ivan Sozonov; Ali Kaya	21; 13	21; 17
3	(Russia) (Turkey)	Vitalij Durkin; Mustafa Yalvarıcı	21; 16	21; 11
4	(Russia) (Turkey)	Vitalij Durkin / Aleksandr Nikolaenko; Ali Kaya / Hasan Hüseyin Durakcan	21; 7	21; 8
5	(Russia) (Turkey)	Stanislav Pukhov / Ivan Sozonov; Nuri Balkan / Mustafa Yalvarıcı	21; 10	21; 7

=== Iceland vs. Turkey ===
Iceland
3
Topsportcentrum Almere, Court 8
14 February 2008, 10:00 UTC+1

Turkey
2

			1	2	3
1	(Iceland) (Turkey)	Magnús Ingi Helgason; Hasan Hüseyin Durakcan	16; 21	20; 22
2	(Iceland) (Turkey)	Atli Jóhannesson; Ali Kaya	10; 21	17; 21
3	(Iceland) (Turkey)	Tryggvi Nielsen; Mustafa Yalvarıcı	20; 22	21; 13	21; 18
4	(Iceland) (Turkey)	Magnús Ingi Helgason / Helgi Jóhannesson; Hasan Hüseyin Durakcan / Mustafa Yalvarıcı	21; 15	17; 21	21; 9
5	(Iceland) (Turkey)	Atli Jóhannesson / Tryggvi Nielsen; Nuri Balkan / Ali Kaya	21; 19	21; 11

=== Russia vs. Spain ===
Russia
4
Topsportcentrum Almere, Court 9
14 February 2008, 18:00 UTC+1

Spain
1

			1	2	3
1	(Russia) (Spain)	Stanislav Pukhov; Pablo Abián	21; 18	23; 21
2	(Russia) (Spain)	Ivan Sozonov; Carlos Longo	14; 21	21; 11	21; 18
3	(Russia) (Spain)	Aleksandr Nikolaenko; José Antonio Crespo	12; 21	21; 12	21; 19
4	(Russia) (Spain)	Vitalij Durkin / Aleksandr Nikolaenko; Pablo Abián / Carlos Longo	21; 17	21; 16
5	(Russia) (Spain)	Stanislav Pukhov / Ivan Sozonov; José Antonio Crespo / Nicolás Escartín	21; 16	16; 21	12; 21

== Group H ==
Pos	Team	Pld	W	L	MF	MA	MD	GF	GA	GD	PF	PA	PD	Pts	Qualification	Wales	Czech Republic	Austria	Switzerland
1	Wales	3	3	0	10	5	+5	20	12	+8	596	545	+51	3	Knockout stage	—	3–2	3–2	4–1
2	Czech Republic	3	2	1	8	7	+1	18	14	+4	563	582	−19	2			—	3–2	3–2
3	Austria	3	1	2	7	8	−1	17	17	0	617	586	+31	1				—	3–2
4	Switzerland	3	0	3	5	10	−5	11	23	−12	594	657	−63	0					—

Source: BWF

=== Austria vs. Wales ===
Austria
2
Topsportcentrum Almere, Court 5
12 February 2008, 14:00 UTC+1

Wales
3

			1	2	3
1	(Austria) (Wales)	Jürgen Koch; Richard Vaughan	10; 21	13; 21
2	(Austria) (Wales)	Heimo Götschl; Raj Popat	21; 18	21; 10
3	(Austria) (Wales)	Michael Lahnsteiner; Martyn Lewis	21; 19	21; 10
4	(Austria) (Wales)	Peter Zauner / Roman Zirnwald; Matthew Hughes / Martyn Lewis	15; 21	18; 21
5	(Austria) (Wales)	Jürgen Koch / Michael Lahnsteiner; Joe Morgan / James Phillips	21; 9	19; 21	19; 21

=== Czech Republic vs. Switzerland ===
Czech Republic
3
Topsportcentrum Almere, Court 6
12 February 2008, 18:00 UTC+1

Switzerland
2

			1	2	3
1	(Czech Republic) (Switzerland)	Petr Koukal; Christian Bösiger	21; 16	24; 22
2	(Czech Republic) (Switzerland)	Jan Fröhlich; Olivier Andrey	22; 20	21; 18
3	(Czech Republic) (Switzerland)	Jan Vondra; Christoph Heiniger	21; 19	21; 9
4	(Czech Republic) (Switzerland)	Pavel Florián / Tomáš Kopřiva; Christian Bösiger / Simon Enkerli	21; 17	17; 21	18; 21
5	(Czech Republic) (Switzerland)	Jan Fröhlich / Jan Vondra; Anthony Dumartheray / Shane Razi	13; 21	13; 21

=== Switzerland vs. Wales ===
Switzerland
1
Topsportcentrum Almere, Court 8
13 February 2008, 14:00 UTC+1

Wales
4

			1	2	3
1	(Switzerland) (Wales)	Christian Bösiger; Richard Vaughan	14; 21	13; 21
2	(Switzerland) (Wales)	Olivier Andrey; Raj Popat	21; 14	21; 16
3	(Switzerland) (Wales)	Christoph Heiniger; Martyn Lewis	18; 21	15; 21
4	(Switzerland) (Wales)	Anthony Dumartheray / Shane Razi; Joe Morgan / James Phillips	20; 22	21; 16	13; 21
5	(Switzerland) (Wales)	Christian Bösiger / Simon Enkerli; Matthew Hughes / Martyn Lewis	10; 21	12; 21

=== Czech Republic vs. Austria ===
Czech Republic
3
Topsportcentrum Almere, Court 7
13 February 2008, 18:00 UTC+1

Austria
2

			1	2	3
1	(Czech Republic) (Austria)	Petr Koukal; Jürgen Koch	21; 9	9; 21	21; 16
2	(Czech Republic) (Austria)	Jan Fröhlich; Heimo Götschl	21; 15	21; 17
3	(Czech Republic) (Austria)	Jan Vondra; Michael Lahnsteiner	21; 10	21; 15
4	(Czech Republic) (Austria)	Pavel Florián / Tomáš Kopřiva; Heimo Götschl / Roman Zirnwald	21; 19	14; 21	22; 24
5	(Czech Republic) (Austria)	Petr Koukal / Jan Vondra; Jürgen Koch / Peter Zauner				w/o

=== Czech Republic vs. Wales ===
Czech Republic
2
Topsportcentrum Almere, Court 3
14 February 2008, 18:00 UTC+1

Wales
3

			1	2	3
1	(Czech Republic) (Wales)	Petr Koukal; Richard Vaughan	5; 21	16; 21
2	(Czech Republic) (Wales)	Jan Fröhlich; Martyn Lewis	21; 14	21; 19
3	(Czech Republic) (Wales)	Jan Vondra; James Phillips	21; 16	21; 14
4	(Czech Republic) (Wales)	Pavel Florián / Tomáš Kopřiva; Martyn Lewis / Joe Morgan	17; 21	17; 21
5	(Czech Republic) (Wales)	Petr Koukal / Jan Vondra; Matthew Hughes / Richard Vaughan	18; 21	11; 21

=== Switzerland vs. Austria ===
Switzerland
2
Topsportcentrum Almere, Court 2
14 February 2008, 18:00 UTC+1

Austria
3

			1	2	3
1	(Switzerland) (Austria)	Christian Bösiger; Jürgen Koch	24; 22	17; 21	21; 14
2	(Switzerland) (Austria)	Olivier Andrey; Heimo Götschl	19; 21	21; 19	21; 7
3	(Switzerland) (Austria)	Christoph Heiniger; Michael Lahnsteiner	18; 21	14; 21
4	(Switzerland) (Austria)	Christian Bösiger / Simon Enkerli; Peter Zauner / Roman Zirnwald	16; 21	15; 21
5	(Switzerland) (Austria)	Anthony Dumartheray / Shane Razi; Jürgen Koch / Michael Lahnsteiner	11; 21	14; 21
