= 2008 European Women's Team Badminton Championships group stage =

This article lists the full results for group stage of 2008 European Women's Team Badminton Championships. The group stage was held from 12 to 14 February 2008.

== Group A ==
Pos	Team	Pld	W	L	MF	MA	MD	GF	GA	GD	PF	PA	PD	Pts	Qualification	Germany	Iceland	Italy	Wales
1	Germany	3	3	0	15	0	+15	30	1	+29	649	299	+350	3	Knockout stage	—	5–0	5–0	5–0
2	Iceland	3	2	1	8	7	+1	17	15	+2	538	544	−6	2			—	3–2	5–0
3	Italy	3	1	2	5	10	−5	12	20	−8	479	583	−104	1				—	3–2
4	Wales	3	0	3	2	13	−11	4	27	−23	386	626	−240	0					—

Source: BWF

=== Italy vs. Iceland ===
Italy
2
Topsportcentrum Almere, Court 8
12 February 2008, 10:00 UTC+1

Iceland
3

			1	2	3
1	(Italy) (Iceland)	Agnese Allegrini; Ragna Ingólfsdóttir	21; 23	21; 17	14; 21
2	(Italy) (Iceland)	Ding Hui; Tinna Helgadóttir	21; 14	21; 8
3	(Italy) (Iceland)	Ira Tomio; Sara Jónsdóttir	11; 21	10; 21
4	(Italy) (Iceland)	Claudia Gruber / Ira Tomio; Katrín Atladóttir / Ragna Ingólfsdóttir	13; 21	10; 21
5	(Italy) (Iceland)	Agnese Allegrini / Ding Hui; Tinna Helgadóttir / Sara Jónsdóttir	24; 22	21; 15

=== Germany vs. Wales ===
Germany
5
Topsportcentrum Almere, Court 7
12 February 2008, 18:00 UTC+1

Wales
0

			1	2	3
1	(Germany) (Wales)	Huaiwen Xu; Caroline Harvey	21; 12	21; 8
2	(Germany) (Wales)	Janet Köhler; Vikki Jones	21; 13	21; 11
3	(Germany) (Wales)	Petra Reichel; Bethan Higginson	21; 10	21; 10
4	(Germany) (Wales)	Carina Mette / Birgit Overzier; Vikki Jones / Rachel Thomas	21; 7	21; 5
5	(Germany) (Wales)	Michaela Peiffer / Kathrin Piotrowski; Kelly Blake / Bethan Higginson	21; 5	21; 8

=== Germany vs. Italy ===
Germany
5
Topsportcentrum Almere, Court 3
13 February 2008, 18:00 UTC+1

Italy
0

			1	2	3
1	(Germany) (Italy)	Juliane Schenk; Ding Hui	21; 13	21; 8
2	(Germany) (Italy)	Karin Schnaase; Ira Tomio	21; 5	21; 10
3	(Germany) (Italy)	Petra Reichel; Claudia Gruber	21; 3	21; 6
4	(Germany) (Italy)	Carina Mette / Michaela Peiffer; Agnese Allegrini / Ding Hui	21; 17	21; 15
5	(Germany) (Italy)	Birgit Overzier / Kathrin Piotrowski; Claudia Gruber / Ira Tomio	21; 3	21; 6

=== Wales vs. Iceland ===
Wales
0
Topsportcentrum Almere, Court 1
13 February 2008, 18:00 UTC+1

Iceland
5

			1	2	3
1	(Wales) (Iceland)	Caroline Harvey; Tinna Helgadóttir	17; 21	12; 21
2	(Wales) (Iceland)	Vikki Jones; Katrín Atladóttir	13; 21	16; 21
3	(Wales) (Iceland)	Rachel Thomas; Sara Jónsdóttir	11; 21	9; 21
4	(Wales) (Iceland)	Kelly Blake / Bethan Higginson; Katrín Atladóttir / Ragna Ingólfsdóttir	14; 21	9; 21
5	(Wales) (Iceland)	Caroline Harvey / Vikki Jones; Tinna Helgadóttir / Sara Jónsdóttir	13; 21	14; 21

=== Wales vs. Italy ===
Wales
2
Topsportcentrum Almere, Court 9
14 February 2008, 14:00 UTC+1

Italy
3

			1	2	3
1	(Wales) (Italy)	Caroline Harvey; Agnese Allegrini	15; 21	14; 21
2	(Wales) (Italy)	Vikki Jones; Ding Hui	12; 21	9; 21
3	(Wales) (Italy)	Bethan Higginson; Ira Tomio	12; 21	21; 18	21; 15
4	(Wales) (Italy)	Kelly Blake / Rachel Thomas; Agnese Allegrini / Ding Hui	17; 21	6; 21
5	(Wales) (Italy)	Caroline Harvey / Vikki Jones; Ira Tomio / Claudia Gruber	21; 11	21; 15

=== Germany vs. Iceland ===
Germany
5
Topsportcentrum Almere, Court 8
14 February 2008, 14:00 UTC+1

Iceland
0

			1	2	3
1	(Germany) (Iceland)	Xu Huaiwen; Ragna Ingólfsdóttir	21; 9	21; 9
2	(Germany) (Iceland)	Janet Köhler; Tinna Helgadóttir	21; 17	21; 16
3	(Germany) (Iceland)	Karin Schnaase; Sara Jónsdóttir	19; 21	21; 11	21; 12
4	(Germany) (Iceland)	Kathrin Piotrowski / Juliane Schenk; Katrín Atladóttir / Ragna Ingólfsdóttir	21; 3	21; 8
5	(Germany) (Iceland)	Michaela Peiffer / Birgit Overzier; Tinna Helgadóttir / Sara Jónsdóttir	21; 7	21; 11

== Group B ==
Pos	Team	Pld	W	L	MF	MA	MD	GF	GA	GD	PF	PA	PD	Pts	Qualification	England	Sweden	Spain
1	England	2	2	0	10	0	+10	20	1	+19	436	286	+150	2	Knockout stage	—	5–0	5–0
2	Sweden	2	1	1	5	5	0	11	11	0	392	377	+15	1			—	5–0
3	Spain	2	0	2	0	10	−10	1	20	−19	272	437	−165	0				—

Source: BWF

=== England vs. Spain ===
England
5
Topsportcentrum Almere, Court 5
12 February 2008, 10:00 UTC+1

Spain
0

			1	2	3
1	(England) (Spain)	Tracey Hallam; Lucía Tavera	21; 7	21; 17
2	(England) (Spain)	Elizabeth Cann; Yoana Martínez	21; 8	21; 15
3	(England) (Spain)	Rachel Howard; Laura Molina	21; 12	22; 20
4	(England) (Spain)	Suzanne Rayappan / Jenny Wallwork; Yoana Martínez / Lucía Tavera	21; 9	21; 10
5	(England) (Spain)	Gail Emms / Gabby White; Sandra Chirlaque / Laura Molina	21; 10	21; 12

=== Spain vs. Sweden ===
Spain
0
Topsportcentrum Almere, Court 4
13 February 2008, 10:00 UTC+1

Sweden
5

			1	2	3
1	(Spain) (Sweden)	Lucía Tavera; Sara Persson	11; 21	9; 21
2	(Spain) (Sweden)	Yoana Martínez; Emelie Lennartsson	15; 21	21; 16	13; 21
3	(Spain) (Sweden)	Sandra Chirlaque; Jessica Carlsson	15; 21	13; 21
4	(Spain) (Sweden)	Carolina Chan / Laura Molina; Emelie Lennartsson / Emma Wengberg	16; 21	11; 21
5	(Spain) (Sweden)	Sandra Chirlaque / Lucía Tavera; Johanna Persson / Elin Bergblom	12; 21	16; 21

=== England vs. Sweden ===
England
5
Topsportcentrum Almere, Court 1
14 February 2008, 14:00 UTC+1

Sweden
0

			1	2	3
1	(England) (Sweden)	Tracey Hallam; Sara Persson	21; 16	16; 21	21; 19
2	(England) (Sweden)	Elizabeth Cann; Emelie Lennartsson	21; 8	21; 14
3	(England) (Sweden)	Jill Pittard; Elin Bergblom	22; 20	21; 16
4	(England) (Sweden)	Gail Emms / Jenny Wallwork; Jessica Carlsson / Emma Wengberg	21; 9	21; 3
5	(England) (Sweden)	Joanne Nicholas / Natalie Munt; Elin Bergblom / Johanna Persson	12; 21	22; 20	22; 20

== Group C ==
Pos	Team	Pld	W	L	MF	MA	MD	GF	GA	GD	PF	PA	PD	Pts	Qualification	France	Ukraine	Switzerland	Austria
1	France	3	2	1	11	4	+7	23	9	+14	632	488	+144	2	Knockout stage	—	4–1	2–3	5–0
2	Ukraine	3	2	1	9	6	+3	21	15	+6	666	612	+54	2			—	3–2	5–0
3	Switzerland	3	2	1	8	7	+1	19	17	+2	636	657	−21	2				—	3–2
4	Austria	3	0	3	2	13	−11	6	28	−22	509	686	−177	0					—

Source: BWF

=== France vs. Austria ===
France
5
Topsportcentrum Almere, Court 1
12 February 2008, 10:00 UTC+1

Austria
0

			1	2	3
1	(France) (Austria)	Pi Hongyan; Simone Prutsch	21; 12	21; 9
2	(France) (Austria)	Weny Rahmawati; Claudia Mayer	21; 9	21; 11
3	(France) (Austria)	Barbara Matias; Elisabeth Baldauf	21; 17	21; 9
4	(France) (Austria)	Élodie Eymard / Weny Rahmawati; Simone Prutsch / Tina Riedl	21; 11	21; 11
5	(France) (Austria)	Laura Choinet / Pi Hongyan; Elisabeth Baldauf / Claudia Mayer	21; 6	21; 18

=== Switzerland vs. Ukraine ===
Switzerland
2
Topsportcentrum Almere, Court 2
12 February 2008, 10:00 UTC+1

Ukraine
3

			1	2	3
1	(Switzerland) (Ukraine)	Huwaina Razi; Larisa Griga	12; 21	6; 21
2	(Switzerland) (Ukraine)	Monika Fischer; Elena Prus	12; 21	14; 21
3	(Switzerland) (Ukraine)	Sabrina Jaquet; Nataliia Golovkina	21; 12	19; 21	21; 14
4	(Switzerland) (Ukraine)	Jeanine Cicognini / Sanya Herzig; Larisa Griga / Olena Mashchenko	21; 16	16; 21	16; 21
5	(Switzerland) (Ukraine)	Sabrina Jaquet / Huwaina Razi; Nataliia Golovkina / Elena Prus	13; 21	21; 13	21; 15

=== Austria vs. Ukraine ===
Austria
0
Topsportcentrum Almere, Court 7
13 February 2008, 10:00 UTC+1

Ukraine
5

			1	2	3
1	(Austria) (Ukraine)	Simone Prutsch; Larisa Griga	16; 21	21; 14	10; 21
2	(Austria) (Ukraine)	Claudia Mayer; Elena Prus	11; 21	18; 21
3	(Austria) (Ukraine)	Miriam Gruber; Olena Mashchenko	17; 21	21; 23
4	(Austria) (Ukraine)	Elisabeth Baldauf / Tina Riedl; Natalia Golovkina / Elena Prus	21; 14	13; 21	10; 21
5	(Austria) (Ukraine)	Miriam Gruber / Claudia Mayer; Larisa Griga / Olena Mashchenko	15; 21	9; 21

=== France vs. Switzerland ===
France
2
Topsportcentrum Almere, Court 6
13 February 2008, 18:00 UTC+1

Switzerland
3

			1	2	3
1	(France) (Switzerland)	Pi Hongyan; Huwaina Razi	21; 9	21; 12
2	(France) (Switzerland)	Weny Rahmawati; Monika Fischer	21; 17	21; 17
3	(France) (Switzerland)	Élisa Chanteur; Sabrina Jaquet	17; 21	9; 21
4	(France) (Switzerland)	Élodie Eymard / Weny Rahmawati; Jeanine Cicognini / Sanya Herzig	18; 21	17; 21
5	(France) (Switzerland)	Laura Choinet / Pi Hongyan; Sabrina Jaquet / Huwaina Razi	21; 5	19; 21	20; 22

=== Austria vs. Switzerland ===
Austria
2
Topsportcentrum Almere, Court 7
14 February 2008, 14:00 UTC+1

Switzerland
3

			1	2	3
1	(Austria) (Switzerland)	Simone Prutsch; Jeanine Cicognini	16; 21	12; 21
2	(Austria) (Switzerland)	Claudia Mayer; Monika Fischer	16; 21	21; 17	21; 16
3	(Austria) (Switzerland)	Miriam Gruber; Sabrina Jaquet	17; 21	16; 21
4	(Austria) (Switzerland)	Miriam Gruber / Claudia Mayer; Monica Fischer / Sanya Herzig	21; 23	17; 21
5	(Austria) (Switzerland)	Elisabeth Baldauf / Tina Riedl; Sabrina Jaquet / Huwaina Razi	21; 18	15; 21	21; 15

=== France vs. Ukraine ===
France
4
Topsportcentrum Almere, Court 6
14 February 2008, 18:00 UTC+1

Ukraine
1

			1	2	3
1	(France) (Ukraine)	Pi Hongyan; Larisa Griga	21; 13	21; 8
2	(France) (Ukraine)	Weny Rahmawati; Elena Prus	21; 16	21; 17
3	(France) (Ukraine)	Élodie Eymard; Mariya Martynenko	12; 21	18; 21
4	(France) (Ukraine)	Laura Choinet / Pi Hongyan; Natalia Golovkina / Elena Prus	22; 20	17; 21	21; 16
5	(France) (Ukraine)	Élodie Eymard / Weny Rahmawati; Larisa Griga / Olena Mashchenko	22; 20	21; 15

== Group D ==
Pos	Team	Pld	W	L	MF	MA	MD	GF	GA	GD	PF	PA	PD	Pts	Qualification	Russia	Finland	Belgium	Ireland
1	Russia	3	3	0	15	0	+15	30	0	+30	631	320	+311	3	Knockout stage	—	5–0	5–0	5–0
2	Finland	3	2	1	8	7	+1	16	17	−1	591	642	−51	2			—	4–1	4–1
3	Belgium	3	1	2	5	10	−5	13	23	−10	584	711	−127	1				—	4–1
4	Ireland	3	0	3	2	13	−11	8	27	−19	559	692	−133	0					—

Source: BWF

=== Russia vs. Belgium ===
Russia
5
Topsportcentrum Almere, Court 4
12 February 2008, 14:00 UTC+1

Belgium
0

			1	2	3
1	(Russia) (Belgium)	Ella Diehl; Nathalie Descamps	21; 12	21; 6
2	(Russia) (Belgium)	Ekaterina Ananina; Lianne Tan	21; 8	21; 17
3	(Russia) (Belgium)	Valeria Sorokina / Nina Vislova; Steffi Annys / Séverine Corvilain	21; 8	21; 13
4	(Russia) (Belgium)	Tatjana Bibik; Jelske Snoeck	21; 12	21; 2
5	(Russia) (Belgium)	Ekaterina Ananina / Anastasia Russkikh; Steffi Daemen / Debbie Janssens	21; 9	21; 11

=== Ireland vs. Finland ===
Ireland
1
Topsportcentrum Almere, Court 2
12 February 2008, 14:00 UTC+1

Finland
4

			1	2	3
1	(Republic of Ireland) (Finland)	Chloe Magee; Anu Nieminen	19; 21	19; 21
2	(Republic of Ireland) (Finland)	Ruth Kilkenny; Elina Väisänen	17; 21	21; 17	19; 21
3	(Republic of Ireland) (Finland)	Sinead Chambers; Saara Hynninen	10; 21	21; 18	9; 21
4	(Republic of Ireland) (Finland)	Bing Huang / Chloe Magee; Sanni Rautala / Elina Väisänen	21; 15	21; 17
5	(Republic of Ireland) (Finland)	Erin Keery / Ruth Kilkenny; Noora Virta / Anu Nieminen	17; 21	17; 21

=== Russia vs. Ireland ===
Russia
5
Topsportcentrum Almere, Court 9
13 February 2008, 10:00 UTC+1

Ireland
0

			1	2	3
1	(Russia) (Republic of Ireland)	Ella Diehl; Chloe Magee	21; 9	21; 16
2	(Russia) (Republic of Ireland)	Tatjana Bibik; Ruth Kilkenny	21; 10	21; 6
3	(Russia) (Republic of Ireland)	Nina Vislova; Erin Keery	21; 7	21; 11
4	(Russia) (Republic of Ireland)	Valeria Sorokina / Nina Vislova; Bing Huang / Chloe Magee	21; 14	21; 16
5	(Russia) (Republic of Ireland)	Ekaterina Ananina / Anastasia Russkikh; Sinead Chambers / Erin Keery	21; 2	21; 8

=== Belgium vs. Finland ===
Belgium
1
Topsportcentrum Almere, Court 9
13 February 2008, 18:00 UTC+1

Finland
4

			1	2	3
1	(Belgium) (Finland)	Nathalie Descamps; Anu Nieminen	22; 24	15; 21
2	(Belgium) (Finland)	Lianne Tan; Elina Väisänen	21; 19	21; 13
3	(Belgium) (Finland)	Janne Elst / Jelske Snoeck; Noora Virta / Sanni Rautala	24; 22	12; 21	23; 25
4	(Belgium) (Finland)	Debbie Janssens; Saara Hynninen	17; 21	16; 21
5	(Belgium) (Finland)	Steffi Annys / Séverine Corvilain; Anu Nieminen / Elina Väisänen	20; 22	21; 11	19; 21

=== Russia vs. Finland ===
Russia
5
Topsportcentrum Almere, Court 3
14 February 2008, 14:00 UTC+1

Finland
0

			1	2	3
1	(Russia) (Finland)	Ella Diehl; Anu Nieminen	21; 13	21; 14
2	(Russia) (Finland)	Ekaterina Ananina; Elina Väisänen	21; 14	21; 15
3	(Russia) (Finland)	Tatjana Bibik; Saara Hynninen	21; 17	21; 12
4	(Russia) (Finland)	Nina Vislova / Valeria Sorokina; Anu Nieminen / Elina Väisänen	21; 9	21; 7
5	(Russia) (Finland)	Ekaterina Ananina / Anastasia Russkikh; Sanni Rautala / Noora Virta	21; 12	22; 20

=== Belgium vs. Ireland ===
Belgium
4
Topsportcentrum Almere, Court 8
14 February 2008, 18:00 UTC+1

Ireland
1

			1	2	3
1	(Belgium) (Republic of Ireland)	Nathalie Descamps; Chloe Magee	21; 18	13; 21	22; 20
2	(Belgium) (Republic of Ireland)	Lianne Tan; Ruth Kilkenny	21; 16	21; 13
3	(Belgium) (Republic of Ireland)	Steffi Daemen; Sinead Chambers	21; 19	14; 21	22; 20
4	(Belgium) (Republic of Ireland)	Janne Elst / Jelske Snoeck; Erin Keery / Ruth Kilkenny	21; 16	10; 21	21; 13
5	(Belgium) (Republic of Ireland)	Steffi Annys / Séverine Corvilain; Sinead Chambers / Chloe Magee	22; 20	17; 21	19; 21

== Group E ==
Pos	Team	Pld	W	L	MF	MA	MD	GF	GA	GD	PF	PA	PD	Pts	Qualification	Denmark	Belarus	Czech Republic	Estonia
1	Denmark	3	3	0	15	0	+15	30	3	+27	687	476	+211	3	Knockout stage	—	5–0	5–0	5–0
2	Belarus	3	2	1	9	6	+3	19	14	+5	610	565	+45	2			—	4–1	5–0
3	Czech Republic	3	1	2	4	11	−7	12	25	−13	613	716	−103	1				—	3–2
4	Estonia	3	0	3	2	13	−11	8	27	−19	533	686	−153	0					—

Source: BWF

=== Denmark vs. Estonia ===
Denmark
5
Topsportcentrum Almere, Court 9
12 February 2008, 14:00 UTC+1

Estonia
0

			1	2	3
1	(Denmark) (Estonia)	Tine Rasmussen; Kati Tolmoff	21; 14	17; 21	21; 17
2	(Denmark) (Estonia)	Camilla Sørensen; Karoliine Hõim	21; 19	21; 12
3	(Denmark) (Estonia)	Nanna Brosolat Jensen; Laura Vana	21; 10	21; 12
4	(Denmark) (Estonia)	Kamilla Rytter Juhl / Lena Frier Kristiansen; Helen Reino / Kati Tolmoff	21; 12	21; 10
5	(Denmark) (Estonia)	Christinna Pedersen / Mie Schjøtt-Kristensen; Karoliine Hõim / Laura Vana	21; 14	21; 10

=== Belarus vs. Czech Republic ===
Belarus
4
Topsportcentrum Almere, Court 6
12 February 2008, 14:00 UTC+1

Czech Republic
1

			1	2	3
1	(Belarus) (Czech Republic)	Olga Konon; Kristína Ludikova	21; 11	24; 22
2	(Belarus) (Czech Republic)	Alesia Zaitsava; Martina Benešová	22; 20	21; 5
3	(Belarus) (Czech Republic)	Vlada Chernyavskaya; Dominika Koukalová	17; 21	21; 11	21; 13
4	(Belarus) (Czech Republic)	Vlada Chernyavskaya / Olga Konon; Kristína Ludikova / Hana Procházková	21; 12	21; 19
5	(Belarus) (Czech Republic)	Maria Kizil / Alesia Zaitsava; Martina Benešová / Hana Milisová	21; 23	21; 11	19; 21

=== Denmark vs. Belarus ===
Denmark
5
Topsportcentrum Almere, Court 3
13 February 2008, 10:00 UTC+1

Belarus
0

			1	2	3
1	(Denmark) (Belarus)	Tine Rasmussen; Olga Konon	21; 16	21; 13
2	(Denmark) (Belarus)	Camilla Sørensen; Maria Kizil	21; 10	21; 13
3	(Denmark) (Belarus)	Nanna Brosolat Jensen; Alesia Zaitsava	24; 22	21; 13
4	(Denmark) (Belarus)	Kamilla Rytter Juhl / Christinna Pedersen; Vlada Chernyavskaya / Olga Konon	21; 14	21; 10
5	(Denmark) (Belarus)	Helle Nielsen / Marie Røpke; Maria Kizil / Alesia Zaitsava	22; 20	21; 3

=== Estonia vs. Czech Republic ===
Estonia
2
Topsportcentrum Almere, Court 3
13 February 2008, 14:00 UTC+1

Czech Republic
3

			1	2	3
1	(Estonia) (Czech Republic)	Kati Tolmoff; Kristína Ludikova	21; 13	21; 19
2	(Estonia) (Czech Republic)	Helen Reino; Martina Benešová	6; 21	21; 17	21; 17
3	(Estonia) (Czech Republic)	Laura Vana; Hana Procházková	21; 13	18; 21	16; 21
4	(Estonia) (Czech Republic)	Helen Reino / Kati Tolmoff; Hana Procházková / Kristína Ludikova	17; 21	12; 21
5	(Estonia) (Czech Republic)	Karoliine Hõim / Laura Vana; Martina Benešová / Hana Milisová	13; 21	12; 21

=== Denmark vs. Czech Republic ===
Denmark
5
Topsportcentrum Almere, Court 7
14 February 2008, 10:00 UTC+1

Czech Republic
0

			1	2	3
1	(Denmark) (Czech Republic)	Tine Rasmussen; Kristína Ludikova	20; 22	21; 18	21; 13
2	(Denmark) (Czech Republic)	Camilla Sørensen; Martina Benešová	22; 20	21; 13
3	(Denmark) (Czech Republic)	Helle Nielsen / Marie Røpke; Kristína Ludikova / Hana Procházková	21; 14	21; 12
4	(Denmark) (Czech Republic)	Nanna Brosolat Jensen; Dominika Koukalová	21; 18	21; 16
5	(Denmark) (Czech Republic)	Mie Schjøtt-Kristensen / Line Damkjær Kruse; Martina Benešová / Hana Milisová	21; 13	21; 11

=== Estonia vs. Belarus ===
Estonia
0
Topsportcentrum Almere, Court 5
14 February 2008, 10:00 UTC+1

Belarus
5

			1	2	3
1	(Estonia) (Belarus)	Kati Tolmoff; Olga Konon	15; 21	14; 21
2	(Estonia) (Belarus)	Karoliine Hõim; Alesia Zaitsava	13; 21	21; 15	10; 21
3	(Estonia) (Belarus)	Helen Reino; Vlada Chernyavskaya	11; 21	16; 21
4	(Estonia) (Belarus)	Karoliine Hõim / Laura Vana; Maria Kizil / Alesia Zaitsava	20; 22	14; 21
5	(Estonia) (Belarus)	Helen Reino / Kati Tolmoff; Vlada Chernyavskaya / Olga Konon	13; 21	15; 21

== Group F ==
Pos	Team	Pld	W	L	MF	MA	MD	GF	GA	GD	PF	PA	PD	Pts	Qualification	Netherlands	Poland	Portugal	Turkey
1	Netherlands (H)	3	3	0	15	0	+15	30	0	+30	632	321	+311	3	Knockout stage	—	5–0	5–0	5–0
2	Poland	3	2	1	8	7	+1	17	15	+2	576	559	+17	2			—	4–1	4–1
3	Portugal	3	1	2	5	10	−5	10	20	−10	449	574	−125	1				—	4–1
4	Turkey	3	0	3	2	13	−11	5	27	−22	458	661	−203	0					—

Source: BWF
(H) Host

=== Netherlands vs. Turkey ===
Netherlands
5
Topsportcentrum Almere, Court 3
12 February 2008, 18:00 UTC+1

Turkey
0

			1	2	3
1	(Netherlands) (Turkey)	Judith Meulendijks; Derya Çalımbay	21; 5	21; 7
2	(Netherlands) (Turkey)	Patty Stolzenbach; Öznur Çalışkan	21; 10	21; 8
3	(Netherlands) (Turkey)	Yik-Man Wong; Hatice Nurgül Sen	21; 14	21; 7
4	(Netherlands) (Turkey)	Karina de Wit / Paulien van Dooremalen; Derya Çalımbay / Nurdan Ekin	21; 12	21; 7
5	(Netherlands) (Turkey)	Eefje Muskens / Ilse Vaessen; Öznur Çalışkan / Hatice Nurgül Sen	21; 14	21; 11

=== Poland vs. Portugal ===
Poland
4
Topsportcentrum Almere, Court 2
12 February 2008, 18:00 UTC+1

Portugal
1

			1	2	3
1	(Poland) (Portugal)	Kamila Augustyn; Filipa Lamy	21; 17	21; 19
2	(Poland) (Portugal)	Agnieszka Wojtkowska; Ana Moura	21; 19	21; 13
3	(Poland) (Portugal)	Anna Narel; Telma Santos	16; 21	9; 21
4	(Poland) (Portugal)	Małgorzata Kurdelska / Agnieszka Wojtkowska; Filipa Lamy / Helena Pestana	21; 9	21; 17
5	(Poland) (Portugal)	Kamila Augustyn / Nadieżda Kostiuczyk; Ana Moura / Telma Santos	21; 7	21; 12

=== Netherlands vs. Poland ===
Netherlands
5
Topsportcentrum Almere, Court 2
13 February 2008, 18:00 UTC+1

Poland
0

			1	2	3
1	(Netherlands) (Poland)	Judith Meulendijks; Małgorzata Kurdelska	21; 6	21; 8
2	(Netherlands) (Poland)	Rachel van Cutsen; Agnieszka Wojtkowska	21; 15	21; 13
3	(Netherlands) (Poland)	Karina de Wit; Anna Narel	21; 14	21; 13
4	(Netherlands) (Poland)	Rachel van Cutsen / Paulien van Dooremalen; Kamila Augustyn / Anna Narel	21; 15	21; 15
5	(Netherlands) (Poland)	Karina de Wit / Judith Meulendijks; Małgorzata Kurdelska / Agnieszka Wojtkowska	21; 14	23; 21

=== Turkey vs. Portugal ===
Turkey
1
Topsportcentrum Almere, Court 8
13 February 2008, 18:00 UTC+1

Portugal
4

			1	2	3
1	(Turkey) (Portugal)	Derya Çalımbay; Filipa Lamy	19; 21	10; 21
2	(Turkey) (Portugal)	Öznur Çalışkan; Ana Moura	22; 24	24; 26
3	(Turkey) (Portugal)	Hatice Nurgül Sen; Telma Santos	13; 21	15; 21
4	(Turkey) (Portugal)	Derya Çalımbay / Nurdan Ekin; Filipa Lamy / Telma Santos	18; 21	8; 21
5	(Turkey) (Portugal)	Öznur Çalışkan / Hatice Nurgül Sen; Ana Moura / Helena Pestana	21; 13	21; 13

=== Netherlands vs. Portugal ===
Netherlands
5
Topsportcentrum Almere, Court 4
14 February 2008, 18:00 UTC+1

Portugal
0

			1	2	3
1	(Netherlands) (Portugal)	Judith Meulendijks; Filipa Lamy	21; 17	21; 10
2	(Netherlands) (Portugal)	Rachel van Cutsen; Ana Moura	21; 11	21; 17
3	(Netherlands) (Portugal)	Patty Stolzenbach; Helena Pestana	21; 7	21; 13
4	(Netherlands) (Portugal)	Karina de Wit / Paulien van Dooremalen; Ana Moura / Telma Santos				w/o
5	(Netherlands) (Portugal)	Eefje Muskens / Ilse Vaessen; Filipa Lamy / Helena Pestana	21; 9	21; 8

=== Turkey vs. Poland ===
Turkey
1
Topsportcentrum Almere, Court 5
14 February 2008, 18:00 UTC+1

Poland
4

			1	2	3
1	(Turkey) (Poland)	Derya Çalımbay; Kamila Augustyn	11; 21	15; 21
2	(Turkey) (Poland)	Öznur Çalışkan; Małgorzata Kurdelska	18; 21	23; 21	11; 21
3	(Turkey) (Poland)	Hatice Nurgül Sen; Anna Narel	15; 21	21; 18	21; 18
4	(Turkey) (Poland)	Derya Çalımbay / Nurdan Ekin; Kamila Augustyn / Anna Narel	19; 21	11; 21
5	(Turkey) (Poland)	Öznur Çalışkan / Hatice Nurgül Sen; Małgorzata Kurdelska / Agnieszka Wojtkowska	22; 24	5; 21

== Group G ==
Pos	Team	Pld	W	L	MF	MA	MD	GF	GA	GD	PF	PA	PD	Pts	Qualification	Scotland	Bulgaria	Slovakia	Lithuania
1	Scotland	3	3	0	14	1	+13	29	2	+27	643	402	+241	3	Knockout stage	—	4–1	5–0	5–0
2	Bulgaria	3	2	1	11	4	+7	22	10	+12	623	485	+138	2			—	5–0	5–0
3	Slovakia	3	1	2	3	12	−9	7	24	−17	457	578	−121	1				—	3–2
4	Lithuania	3	0	3	2	13	−11	5	27	−22	382	640	−258	0					—

Source: BWF

=== Slovakia vs. Scotland ===
Slovakia
0
Topsportcentrum Almere, Court 6
12 February 2008, 10:00 UTC+1

Scotland
5

			1	2	3
1	(Slovakia) (Scotland)	Eva Sládeková; Susan Hughes	11; 21	11; 21
2	(Slovakia) (Scotland)	Zuzana Orlovská; Linda Sloan	16; 21	14; 21
3	(Slovakia) (Scotland)	Kvetoslava Orlovská; Yuan Wemyss	11; 21	15; 21
4	(Slovakia) (Scotland)	Gabriela Zabavníková / Eva Sládeková; Imogen Bankier / Yuan Wemyss	12; 21	20; 22
5	(Slovakia) (Scotland)	Kvetoslava Orlovská / Zuzana Orlovská; Jillie Cooper / Linda Sloan	11; 21	13; 21

=== Bulgaria vs. Lithuania ===
Bulgaria
5
Topsportcentrum Almere, Court 8
12 February 2008, 14:00 UTC+1

Lithuania
0

			1	2	3
1	(Bulgaria) (Lithuania)	Linda Zetchiri; Akvilė Stapušaitytė	21; 19	21; 12
2	(Bulgaria) (Lithuania)	Diana Dimova; Kristina Dovydaitytė	19; 21	21; 9	21; 11
3	(Bulgaria) (Lithuania)	Gabriela Banova; Gerda Voitechovskaja	21; 11	21; 15
4	(Bulgaria) (Lithuania)	Petya Nedelcheva / Dimitria Popstoikova; Kristina Dovydaitytė / Akvilė Stapušaitytė	21; 12	21; 12
5	(Bulgaria) (Lithuania)	Maya Dobreva / Atanaska Spasova; Oksana Jaciuk / Gerda Voitechovskaja	21; 7	21; 12

=== Lithuania vs. Scotland ===
Lithuania
0
Topsportcentrum Almere, Court 6
13 February 2008, 10:00 UTC+1

Scotland
5

			1	2	3
1	(Lithuania) (Scotland)	Akvilė Stapušaitytė; Susan Hughes	14; 21	6; 21
2	(Lithuania) (Scotland)	Kristina Dovydaitytė; Linda Sloan	5; 21	12; 21
3	(Lithuania) (Scotland)	Gerda Voitechovskaja; Yuan Wemyss	9; 21	9; 21
4	(Lithuania) (Scotland)	Kristina Dovydaitytė / Akvilė Stapušaitytė; Imogen Bankier / Yuan Wemyss	7; 21	6; 21
5	(Lithuania) (Scotland)	Oksana Jaciuk / Gerda Voitechovskaja; Jillie Cooper / Susan Hughes	9; 21	10; 21

=== Bulgaria vs. Slovakia ===
Bulgaria
5
Topsportcentrum Almere, Court 1
13 February 2008, 10:00 UTC+1

Slovakia
0

			1	2	3
1	(Bulgaria) (Slovakia)	Petya Nedelcheva; Eva Sládeková	21; 8	21; 5
2	(Bulgaria) (Slovakia)	Linda Zetchiri; Zuzana Orlovská	21; 12	21; 7
3	(Bulgaria) (Slovakia)	Gabriela Banova; Kvetoslava Orlovská	21; 12	24; 26	22; 20
4	(Bulgaria) (Slovakia)	Diana Dimova / Dimitria Popstoikova; Gabriela Zabavníková / Eva Sládeková	21; 18	21; 15
5	(Bulgaria) (Slovakia)	Maya Dobreva / Atanaska Spasova; Kvetoslava Orlovská / Zuzana Orlovská	21; 11	21; 12

=== Bulgaria vs. Scotland ===
Bulgaria
1
Topsportcentrum Almere, Court 2
14 February 2008, 10:00 UTC+1

Scotland
4

			1	2	3
1	(Bulgaria) (Scotland)	Petya Nedelcheva; Susan Hughes	16; 21	15; 21
2	(Bulgaria) (Scotland)	Linda Zetchiri; Linda Sloan	15; 21	21; 23
3	(Bulgaria) (Scotland)	Gabriela Banova; Yuan Wemyss	15; 21	12; 21
4	(Bulgaria) (Scotland)	Maya Dobreva / Atanaska Spasova; Jillie Cooper / Susan Hughes	21; 8	17; 21	14; 21
5	(Bulgaria) (Scotland)	Diana Dimova / Petya Nedelcheva; Imogen Bankier / Yuan Wemyss	19; 21	18; 21

=== Lithuania vs. Slovakia ===
Lithuania
2
Topsportcentrum Almere, Court 3
14 February 2008, 10:00 UTC+1

Slovakia
3

			1	2	3
1	(Lithuania) (Slovakia)	Akvilė Stapušaitytė; Eva Sládeková	21; 19	21; 14
2	(Lithuania) (Slovakia)	Kristina Dovydaitytė; Zuzana Orlovská	14; 21	8; 21
3	(Lithuania) (Slovakia)	Gerda Voitechovskaja; Kvetoslava Orlovská	9; 21	9; 21
4	(Lithuania) (Slovakia)	Kristina Dovydaitytė / Akvilė Stapušaitytė; Kvetoslava Orlovská / Zuzana Orlovská	17; 21	21; 15	21; 6
5	(Lithuania) (Slovakia)	Oksana Jaciuk / Gerda Voitechovskaja; Gabriela Zabavníková / Eva Sládeková	4; 21	9; 21
