= 2008 European Men's Team Badminton Championships knockout stage =

This article lists the full results for knockout stage of 2008 European Men's Team Badminton Championships.

== Bracket ==
Quarter-finals
15 February 2008
Denmark	3
Sweden	0
Germany	3
Wales	0
Netherlands	2
Poland	3
Russia	0
England	3

Semi-finals
16 February 2008
Denmark	3
Germany	1
Poland	0
England	3

Final
17 February 2008
Denmark	3
England	0
Third place
17 February 2008
Germany	3
Poland	1

== Quarter-finals ==
=== Denmark vs. Sweden ===
Denmark
3
Topsportcentrum Almere, Court 1
15 February 2008, 16:00 UTC+1

Sweden
0

			1	2	3
1	(Denmark) (Sweden)	Kenneth Jonassen; Magnus Sahlberg	21; 15	17; 21	21; 7
2	(Denmark) (Sweden)	Peter Gade; Henri Hurskainen	21; 17	21; 17
3	(Denmark) (Sweden)	Mathias Boe / Joachim Fischer Nielsen; Peder Nordin / Mattias Wigardt	21; 8	21; 5
4	(Denmark) (Sweden)	Joachim Persson; Gabriel Ulldahl				not played
5	(Denmark) (Sweden)	Jens Eriksen / Martin Lundgaard Hansen; Tim Foo / Henri Hurskainen				not played

=== Germany vs. Wales ===
Germany
3
Topsportcentrum Almere, Court 4
15 February 2008, 16:00 UTC+1

Wales
0

			1	2	3
1	(Germany) (Wales)	Björn Joppien; Richard Vaughan	21; 15	17; 21	21; 16
2	(Germany) (Wales)	Marc Zwiebler; Raj Popat	21; 8			retired
3	(Germany) (Wales)	Roman Spitko; Martyn Lewis	21; 15	21; 17
4	(Germany) (Wales)	Kristof Hopp / Johannes Schöttler; Joe Morgan / James Phillips				not played
5	(Germany) (Wales)	Michael Fuchs / Roman Spitko; Matthew Hughes / Martyn Lewis				not played

=== Netherlands vs. Poland ===
Netherlands
2
Topsportcentrum Almere, Court 2
15 February 2008, 16:00 UTC+1

Poland
3

			1	2	3
1	(Netherlands) (Poland)	Dicky Palyama; Przemysław Wacha	17; 21	10; 21
2	(Netherlands) (Poland)	Eric Pang; Łukasz Moreń	21; 12	21; 17
3	(Netherlands) (Poland)	Ruud Bosch / Koen Ridder; Michał Łogosz / Robert Mateusiak	18; 21	20; 22
4	(Netherlands) (Poland)	Rune Massing; Hubert Pączek	17; 21	21; 19	21; 13
5	(Netherlands) (Poland)	Jorrit de Ruiter / Eric Pang; Adam Cwalina / Przemysław Wacha	17; 21	17; 21

=== Russia vs. England ===
Russia
0
Topsportcentrum Almere, Court 3
15 February 2008, 16:00 UTC+1

England
3

			1	2	3
1	(Russia) (England)	Stanislav Pukhov; Andrew Smith	21; 15	17; 21	12; 21
2	(Russia) (England)	Ivan Sozonov; Rajiv Ouseph	10; 21	21; 12	11; 21
3	(Russia) (England)	Vitalij Durkin; Aamir Ghaffar	20; 22	15; 21
4	(Russia) (England)	Stanislav Pukhov / Ivan Sozonov; David Lindley / Nathan Robertson				not played
5	(Russia) (England)	Vitalij Durkin / Aleksandr Nikolaenko; Robert Blair / Anthony Clark				not played

== Semi-finals ==
=== Denmark vs. Germany ===
Denmark
3
Topsportcentrum Almere, Court 1
16 February 2008, 16:00 UTC+1

Germany
1

			1	2	3
1	(Denmark) (Germany)	Kenneth Jonassen; Björn Joppien	21; 12	21; 8
2	(Denmark) (Germany)	Jens Eriksen / Martin Lundgaard Hansen; Michael Fuchs / Roman Spitko	19; 21	13; 21
3	(Denmark) (Germany)	Peter Gade; Marc Zwiebler	21; 12	15; 21	21; 16
4	(Denmark) (Germany)	Mathias Boe / Joachim Fischer Nielsen; Kristof Hopp / Johannes Schöttler	21; 17	19; 21	21; 9
5	(Denmark) (Germany)	Joachim Persson; Dieter Domke				not played

=== Poland vs. England ===
Poland
0
Topsportcentrum Almere, Court 2
16 February 2008, 16:00 UTC+1

England
3

			1	2	3
1	(Poland) (England)	Łukasz Moreń; Andrew Smith	13; 21	15; 21
2	(Poland) (England)	Adam Cwalina; Rajiv Ouseph	12; 21	12; 21
3	(Poland) (England)	Łukasz Moreń / Hubert Pączek; David Lindley / Nathan Robertson	10; 21	11; 21
4	(Poland) (England)	Maciej Kowalik; Aamir Ghaffar				not played
5	(Poland) (England)	Adam Cwalina / Wojciech Szkudlarczyk; Robert Blair / Anthony Clark				not played

== Third place play-off ==
=== Germany vs. Poland ===
Germany
3
Topsportcentrum Almere, Court 2
17 February 2008, 10:00 UTC+1

Poland
1

			1	2	3
1	(Germany) (Poland)	Björn Joppien; Przemysław Wacha	17; 21	12; 21
2	(Germany) (Poland)	Marc Zwiebler; Łukasz Moreń	21; 12	21; 18
3	(Germany) (Poland)	Roman Spitko; Hubert Pączek	21; 16	21; 13
4	(Germany) (Poland)	Kristof Hopp / Johannes Schöttler; Adam Cwalina / Przemysław Wacha	21; 14	21; 17
5	(Germany) (Poland)	Michael Fuchs / Roman Spitko; Michał Łogosz / Robert Mateusiak				not played

== Final ==
=== Denmark vs. England ===
Denmark
3
Topsportcentrum Almere, Court 1
17 February 2008, 15:00 UTC+1

England
0

			1	2	3
1	(Denmark) (England)	Kenneth Jonassen; Andrew Smith	21; 7	21; 13
2	(Denmark) (England)	Jens Eriksen / Martin Lundgaard Hansen; Robert Blair / Anthony Clark	13; 21	21; 19	21; 14
3	(Denmark) (England)	Peter Gade; Rajiv Ouseph	21; 10	21; 17
4	(Denmark) (England)	Mathias Boe / Joachim Fischer Nielsen; David Lindley / Nathan Robertson				not played
5	(Denmark) (England)	Joachim Persson; Nathan Rice				not played
