= Badminton at the 2015 European Games – Men's singles =

Badminton's men's singles at the 2015 European Games
- Venue: Baku Sports Hall
- Dates: 22–28 June
- Competitors: 32 from 32 nations

Medalists
gold medal	Pablo Abián	Spain
silver medal	Emil Holst	Denmark
bronze medal	Dieter Domke	Germany
bronze medal	Kęstutis Navickas	Lithuania

The badminton men's singles tournament at the 2015 European Games took place from 22 to 28 June.

== Competition format ==
The singles tournaments will be played with 32 participants, initially playing in eight groups of four, before the top two from each group qualify for a 16-player knock-out stage.

=== Schedule ===
All times are in AZST (UTC+05).

Start time	Session
22 June 9:00	Group stage, matchday 1
23 June 9:00	Group stage, matchday 2
24 June 9:00	Group stage, matchday 3
25 June 10:00	Round of 16
26 June 10:00	Quarter-finals
27 June 10:00	Semi-finals
28 June 12:00	Final

== Seeds ==
Seeds for all badminton events at the inaugural European Games were announced on 29 May.

1. Scott Evans (IRL)
2. Misha Zilberman (ISR)
3. Pablo Abián (ESP)
4. Eric Pang (NED)
5. Petr Koukal (CZE)
6. Luka Wraber (AUT)
7. Vladimir Malkov (RUS)
8. Emil Holst (DEN)

== Results ==
The group stage draws were held on 2 June.

=== Group stage ===
==== Group A ====
Pos	Team	Pld	W	L	GF	GA	GD	Qualification
1	Scott Evans (IRL) [1]	3	3	0	6	1	+5	Qualification to knock-out stage
2	Yuhan Tan (BEL)	3	2	1	5	2	+3	Qualification to knock-out stage
3	Gergely Krausz (HUN)	3	1	2	2	4	−2	
4	Georgios Charalambidis (GRE)	3	0	3	0	6	−6	

Source: Baku 2015

==== Group B ====
Pos	Team	Pld	W	L	GF	GA	GD	Qualification
1	Misha Zilberman (ISR) [2]	3	3	0	6	0	+6	Qualification to knock-out stage
2	Rosario Maddaloni (ITA)	3	2	1	4	2	+2	Qualification to knock-out stage
3	Kanan Rzayev (AZE)	3	1	2	2	4	−2	
4	Samuel Cali (MLT)	3	0	3	0	6	−6	

Source: Baku 2015

==== Group C ====
Pos	Team	Pld	W	L	GF	GA	GD	Qualification
1	Dieter Domke (GER)	3	2	1	4	2	+2	Qualification to knock-out stage
2	Pablo Abián (ESP) [3]	3	2	1	4	2	+2	Qualification to knock-out stage
3	Iztok Utroša (SLO)	3	1	2	2	4	−2	
4	Raul Must (EST)	3	1	2	2	4	−2	

Source: Baku 2015

==== Group D ====
Pos	Team	Pld	W	L	GF	GA	GD	Qualification
1	Kęstutis Navickas (LTU)	3	3	0	6	1	+5	Qualification to knock-out stage
2	Blagovest Kisyov (BUL)	3	2	1	5	2	+3	Qualification to knock-out stage
3	Eric Pang (NED) [4]	0	0	0	0	0	0	
4	Dmytro Zavadsky (UKR)	0	0	0	0	0	0	

Source: Baku 2015

==== Group E ====
Pos	Team	Pld	W	L	GF	GA	GD	Qualification
1	Petr Koukal (CZE) [5]	3	3	0	6	0	+6	Qualification to knock-out stage
2	Emre Vural (TUR)	3	2	1	4	3	+1	Qualification to knock-out stage
3	Mathias Bonny (SUI)	3	1	2	2	4	−2	
4	Igor Bjelan (SRB)	3	0	3	1	6	−5	

Source: Baku 2015

==== Group F ====
Pos	Team	Pld	W	L	GF	GA	GD	Qualification
1	Michał Rogalski (POL)	3	3	0	6	0	+6	Qualification to knock-out stage
2	Luka Wraber (AUT) [6]	3	2	1	4	2	+2	Qualification to knock-out stage
3	Vladzislav Kushnir (BLR)	3	1	2	2	4	−2	
4	Reinis Krauklis (LAT)	3	0	3	0	6	−6	

Source: Baku 2015

==== Group G ====
Pos	Team	Pld	W	L	GF	GA	GD	Qualification
1	Vladimir Malkov (RUS) [7]	3	3	0	6	0	+6	Qualification to knock-out stage
2	Eetu Heino (FIN)	3	2	1	4	3	+1	Qualification to knock-out stage
3	Kári Gunnarsson (ISL)	3	1	2	3	4	−1	
4	Jarolím Vicen (SVK)	3	0	3	0	6	−6	

Source: Baku 2015

==== Group H ====
Pos	Team	Pld	W	L	GF	GA	GD	Qualification
1	Emil Holst (DEN) [8]	3	3	0	6	1	+5	Qualification to knock-out stage
2	Zvonimir Đurkinjak (CRO)	3	2	1	5	3	+2	Qualification to knock-out stage
3	Lucas Corvée (FRA)	3	1	2	3	4	−1	
4	Ricardo Silva (POR)	3	0	3	0	6	−6	

Source: Baku 2015

=== Knock-out stage ===
Round of 16
1	S Evans (IRL)	21	21
B Kisyov (BUL)	6	13
8	E Holst (DEN)	21	21
R Maddaloni (ITA)	16	16
D Domke (GER)	21	21
E Heino (FIN)	17	14
5	P Koukal (CZE)	21	21
6	L Wraber (AUT)	12	16
Y Tan (BEL)	21	21
M Rogalski (POL)	11	16
E Vural (TUR)	11	13
K Navickas (LTU)	21	21
3	P Abián (ESP)	25	19	21
7	V Malkov (RUS)	23	21	15
Z Đurkinjak (CRO)	13	21	21
2	M Zilberman (ISR)	21	18	11

Quarter-finals
1	S Evans (IRL)	17	14
8	E Holst (DEN)	21	21
D Domke (GER)	21	18	21
5	P Koukal (CZE)	18	21	17
Y Tan (BEL)	14	6
K Navickas (LTU)	21	21
3	P Abián (ESP)	21	21
Z Đurkinjak (CRO)	12	13

Semi-finals
8	E Holst (DEN)	21	21
D Domke (GER)	14	15
K Navickas (LTU)	22	16	13
3	P Abián (ESP)	20	21	21

Final
8	E Holst (DEN)	12	21
3	P Abián (ESP)	21	23
