= Lithuania national badminton team =

National badminton team representing Lithuania

Lithuania
- Association: Lietuvos Badmintono Federacija (LBF)
- Confederation: BE (Europe)
- President: Algirdas Kepežinskas

BWF ranking
- Current ranking: 74 ▼2 (2 January 2024)
- Highest ranking: 29 (6 January 2015)

Sudirman Cup
- Appearances: 9 (first in 1997)
- Best result: Group stage

European Mixed Team Championships
- Appearances: 3 (first in 2009)
- Best result: Group stage

European Men's Team Championships
- Appearances: 6 (first in 2008)
- Best result: Group stage

European Women's Team Championships
- Appearances: 4 (first in 2008)
- Best result: Group stage

The Lithuania national badminton team (Lithuanian: Lietuvos nacionalinė badmintono rinktinė) represents Lithuania in international badminton team competitions. The team is managed by the Lithuanian Badminton Federation. Lithuania competed in the 1989 Sudirman Cup as part of the Soviet Union.

In the European championships, the Lithuanian men's and women's teams debuted in the 2008 European Men's and Women's Team Badminton Championships. Lithuania won its first badminton medal in the European Games when four-time national champion, Kęstutis Navickas defeated Yuhan Tan of Belgium to earn a place in the men's singles semifinal.

== Competitive record ==
=== Thomas Cup ===
| Year | Round | Pos |
|---|---|---|
| 1949 | Part of the Soviet Union | |
| 1952 | Part of the Soviet Union | |
| 1955 | Part of the Soviet Union | |
| 1958 | Part of the Soviet Union | |
| 1961 | Part of the Soviet Union | |
| 1964 | Part of the Soviet Union | |
| 1967 | Part of the Soviet Union | |
| 1970 | Part of the Soviet Union | |
| 1973 | Part of the Soviet Union | |
| 1976 | Part of the Soviet Union | |
| 1979 | Part of the Soviet Union | |
| 1982 | Part of the Soviet Union | |
| 1984 | Part of the Soviet Union | |
| 1986 | Part of the Soviet Union | |
| 1988 | Part of the Soviet Union | |
| 1990 | Part of the Soviet Union | |
| 1992 | Did not enter | |
| 1994 | Did not enter | |
| 1996 | Did not qualify | |
| 1998 | Did not enter | |
| 2000 | Did not enter | |
| 2002 | Did not enter | |
| 2004 | Did not qualify | |

Sudirman Cup

| Year | Result |
|---|---|
| 1989; 1991 | Part of Soviet Union |
| 1997 | 55th - Group 8 Promoted |
| 1999 | 43rd - Group 6 |
| 2001 | 45th - Group 6 |
| 2003 | 40th - Group 6 |
| 2005 | 34th - Group 5 |
| 2007 | 34th - Group 5 |
| 2009 | 26th - Group 4 |
| 2013 | 28th - Group 3 |
| 2019 | 27th - Group 3 |

== Participation in European Team Badminton Championships ==
Men's Team

| Year | Result |
|---|---|
| (Netherlands) 2008 | Group stage |
| (Poland) 2010 | Group stage |
| (Switzerland) 2014 | Group stage |
| (Russia) 2016 | Group stage |
| (Russia) 2018 | Group stage |
| (France) 2020 | Group stage |

Women's Team

| Year | Result |
|---|---|
| (Netherlands) 2008 | Group stage |
| (Russia) 2016 | Group stage |
| (Russia) 2018 | Group stage |
| (France) 2020 | Group stage |
| (Turkey) 2026 | Did not qualify |

Mixed Team

| Year | Result |
|---|---|
| (England) 2009 | Group stage |
| (Netherlands) 2011 | Group stage |
| (Russia) 2013 | Group stage |

== Junior competitive record ==
=== World Junior Team Championships ===
==== Suhandinata Cup ====
| Year | Result |
|---|---|
| (Spain) 2016 | Group E2 - 40th of 52 |
| (Indonesia) 2017 | Did not enter |
| (Canada) 2018 | Did not enter |
| (Russia) 2019 | Group H2 - 28th of 43 |
| (New Zealand) 2020 | Cancelled |
| (China) 2021 | Cancelled |
| (Spain) 2022 | Did not enter |
| (United States) 2023 | Group B |

=== European Junior Team Championships ===
==== Mixed team ====
| Year | Result |
|---|---|
| (Italy) 2009 | Group stage |
| (Finland) 2011 | Group stage |
| (Turkey) 2013 | Group stage |
| (Poland) 2015 | Group stage |
| (Estonia) 2018 | Group stage |
| (Finland) 2020 | Withdrew |
| (Serbia) 2022 | Group stage |

== Players ==
=== Current squad ===
As of 2 January 2024

==== Men's team ====
| Name | DoB/Age | Ranking of event | | |
| Name | DoB/Age | MS | MD | XD |
|---|---|---|---|---|
| Jonas Petkus | 23 July 2001 (age 24) | 1319 | 586 | 1284 |
| Danielius Beržanskis | 29 May 2003 (age 23) | 1325 | 586 | 561 |
| Augustas Valatka | 20 October 2003 (age 22) | - | - | - |
| Ąžuolas Barkauskas | 16 April 2004 (age 22) | - | - | - |
| Domas Paksys | 18 August 2007 (age 18) | 1735 | - | - |

==== Women's team ====
| Name | DoB/Age | Ranking of event | | |
| Name | DoB/Age | WS | WD | XD |
|---|---|---|---|---|
| Samanta Golubickaite | 14 December 2002 (age 23) | 190 | 589 | 561 |
| Vilte Paulauskaite | 7 April 2006 (age 20) | 375 | 334 | 1284 |
| Monika Sukackaite | 23 May 2006 (age 20) | 1096 | 334 | 1312 |
| Jore Kavaliauskaitė | 22 May 2009 (age 17) | 1085 | 550 | - |
| Jorūnė Šalnaitė | 6 December 2008 (age 17) | 1183 | 550 | - |
