= Lithuanian National Badminton Championships =

The Lithuanian National Badminton Championships is a tournament organized to crown the best badminton players in Lithuania. They are held since 1963. Organised by Lithuanian Badminton Federation.

== Past winners ==
Year	Men's singles	Women's singles	Men's doubles	Women's doubles	Mixed doubles
1963	Juozas Kriščiūnas	Regina Šemetaitė	Juozas Kriščiūnas; Povilas Tamošauskas	Jolanta Kazarinaitė; Aurelija Kostiuškaitė	Juozas Kriščiūnas; Jolanta Kazarinaitė
1964	Juozas Kriščiūnas	Jolanta Kazarinaitė	Juozas Kriščiūnas; Vladas Rybakovas	Jolanta Kazarinaitė; Valentina Guseva	Vladas Rybakovas; Valentina Gusva
1965	Petras Zubė	Regina Šemetaitė	Algirdas Vitkauskas; Petras Zubė	Regina Šemetaitė; Janina Laucytė	Petras Zubė; Regina Vilutytė
1966	Petras Zubė	Vida Jurevičienė	Vytas Ripinskas; Petras Zubė	Regina Grigaitė; Vale Visniauskaitė	Petras Zubė; Janina Laucytė
1967	Juozas Baltrimas	Vida Jurevičienė	Vytas Ripinskas; Petras Zubė	Vida Jurevičienė; Vale Viniauskaitė	Petras Zubė; Regina Minelgienė
1968	Juozas Baltrimas	Vida Jurevičienė	Juozas Kriščiūnas; Petras Zubė	Vida Jurevičienė; Undinė Jagelaitė	Juozas Kriščiūnas; Vida Jurevičienė
1969	Petras Zubė	Valė Viskinauskaitė	Antanas Narvilas; Regimantas Kijauskas	Regina Šemetaitė; Salvija Petronytė	Petras Zubė; Regina Minelgienė
1970	Giedrius Voroneckas	Vida Jurevičienė	Regimantas Kijauskas; Vidas Kijauskas	Vida Jurevičienė; Reina Šemetaitė	Petras Zubė; Regina Šemetaitė
1971	Petras Zubė	Vida Jurevičienė	Antanas Narvilas; Petras Zubė	Vida Jurevičienė; Undinė Jagelaitė	Petras Zubė; Regina Šemetaitė
1972	Petras Zubė	Vida Jurevičienė	Juozas Baltrimas; Alimantas Mockus	Vida Jurevičienė; Nijolė Sabaitė	Giedrius Voroneckas; Vida Jurevičienė
1973	Juozas Baltrimas	Nijolė Sabaitė	Antanas Kašuba; Petras Zubė	Danutė Staniukaitytė; Nijolė Sabaitė	Petras Zubė; Drazina Dovidavičiūtė
1974	Antanas Narvilas	Nijolė Sabaitė	Antanas Kašuba; Antanas Narvilas	Alma Tarutienė; Nijolė Sabaitė	Sigitas Jasaitis; Nijolė Sabaitė
1975	Juozas Baltrimas	Nijolė Sabaitė	Antanas Narvilas; Justinas Stankus	Genutė Baltrimaitė; Danutė Staniukaitytė	Juozas Baltrimas; Genutė Baltrimaitė
1976	Juozas Baltrimas	Nijolė Noreikaitė	Antanas Narvilas; Justinas Stankus	Virginija Cechanavičiūtė; Nijolė Noreikaitė	Juozas Baltrimas; Genutė Baltrimaitė
1977	Antanas Narvilas	Virginija Cechanavičiūtė	Antanas Narvilas; Justinas Stankus	Virginija Cechanavičiūtė; Danutė Staniukaitytė	Antanas Narvilas; Danguolė Blevaitienė
1978	Juozas Baltrimas	Virginija Cechanavičiūtė	Arturas Jaskevičius; Justinas Stankus	Virginija Cechanavičiūtė; Asta Šimbelytė	Rimas Liubartas; Virginija Cechanavičiūtė
1979	Antanas Narvilas	Virginija Cechanavičiūtė	Juozas Baltrimas; Kęstutis Dabravolskis	Virginija Cechanavičiūtė; Milda Taraskevičiūtė	Juozas Baltrimas; Genutė Baltrimaitė
1980	Arturas Jaskevičius	Milda Taraskevičiūtė	Juozas Baltrimas; Kęstutis Baltakis	Asta Šimbelytė; Milda Taraskevičiūtė	Sigitas Jasaitis; Silva Senkutė
1981	Juozas Baltrimas	Danguolė Blevaitienė	Arturas Jaskevičius; Antanas Narvilas	Danguolė Blevaitienė; Silva Senkutė	Anatas Narvilas; Danguolė Blevaitienė
1982	Juozas Baltrimas	Danguolė Blevaitienė	Juozas Baltrimas; Sigitas Jasaitis	Danguolė Blevaitienė; Silva Senkutė	Anatas Narvilas; Danguolė Blevaitienė
1983	Arūnas Petkevičius	Jūratė Markaitytė	Kęstutis Baltakis; Arūnas Petkevičius	Jūratė Markaitytė; Jūratė Lazauninkaitė	Kstutis Baltakis; Jūratė Andriuscenkaitė
1984	Arūnas Petkevičius	Jūratė Markaitytė	Kęstutis Baltakis; Arūnas Petkevičius	Jūratė Markaitytė; Edita Andriuscenkaitė	Arūnas Petkevičius; Jūratė Markaitytė
1985	Arūnas Petkevičius	Jūratė Markaitytė	Kęstutis Baltakis; Arūnas Petkevičius	Jūratė Markaitytė; Silva Senkutė	Arūnas Petkevičius; Jūratė Markaitytė
1986	Arūnas Petkevičius	Jūratė Markaitytė	Kęstutis Baltakis; Arūnas Petkevičius	Jūratė Markaitytė; Aušrinė Gebranaitė	Egidijus Jankauskas; Jūratė Markaitytė
1987	Egidijus Jankauskas	Jūratė Markaitytė	Kęstutis Baltakis; Arūnas Petkevičius	Jūratė Markaitytė; Danguolė Blevaitienė	Egidijus Jankauskas; Danguolė Blevaitienė
1988	Arūnas Petkevičius	Rasa Mikšytė	Algirdas Kepežinskas; Ovidius Česonis	Jūratė Markaitytė; Danguolė Blevaitienė	Arūnas Petkevičius; Danguolė Blevaitienė
1989	Ovidijus Cesonis	Aušrinė Gabrenaitė	Egidijus Jankauskus; Ovidius Česonis	Aušrinė Gebranaitė; Rasa Mikšytė	Egidijus Jankauskas; Aušrinė Gabrenaitė
1990	Aivaras Kvedarauskas	Rasa Mikšytė	Algirdas Kepežinskas; Ovidius Česonis	Jūratė Markaitytė; Danguolė Blevaitienė	Aivaras Kvedarauskas; Rasa Mikšytė
1991	Egidius Jankauskas	Rasa Mikšytė	Egidijus Jankauskus; Ovidius Česonis	Rasa Mikšytė; Solveiga Stasaitytė	Algirdas Kepežinskas; Rasa Mikšytė
1992	Egidius Jankauskas	Rasa Mikšytė	Aivaras Kvedarauskas; Vygandas Virzintas	Rasa Mikšytė; Solveiga Stasaitytė	Algirdas Kepežinskas; Rasa Mikšytė
1993	Edigius Jankauskas	Solveiga Stasaitytė	Edigius Jankauskas; Aivaras Kvedarauskas	Rasa Mikšytė; Solveiga Stasaitytė	Edigius Jankauskas; Solveiga Stasaitytė
1994	Aivaras Kvedarauskas	Aina Kravtienė	Aivaras Kvedarauskas; Ovidijus Zukauskas	Indre Ivanauskaitė; Rasa Mikšytė	Aivaras Kvedarauskas; Indze Ivanauskaitė
1995	Aivaras Kvedarauskas	Rasa Mikšytė	Algirdas Kepežinskas; Aivaras Kvedarauskas	Indre Ivanauskaitė; Rasa Mikšytė	Aivaras Kvedarauskas; Rasa Mikšytė
1996	Aivaras Kvedarauskas	Rasa Myksite	Aivaras Kvedarauskas; Donatas Vievesis	Indre Ivanauskaitė; Rasa Mikšytė	Aivaras Kvedarauskas; Rasa Mikšytė
1997	Aivaras Kvedarauskas	Rasa Myksite	Aivaras Kvedarauskas; Gediminas Andrikonis	Neringa Karosaitė; Aina Kravtienė	Aivaras Kvedarauskas; Rasa Mikšytė
1998	Aivaras Kvedarauskas	Neringa Karosaitė	Aivaras Kvedarauskas; Dainius Mikalauskas	Rasa Mikšytė; Jūratė Prevelienė	Aivaras Kvedarauskas; Jūratė Prevelienė
1999	Aivaras Kvedarauskas	Erika Milikauskaitė	Aivaras Kvedarauskas; Dainius Mikalauskas	Rasa Mikšytė; Jūratė Prevelienė	Aivaras Kvedarauskas; Rasa Mikšytė
2000	Aivaras Kvedarauskas	Erika Milikauskaitė	Aivaras Kvedarauskas; Donatas Vievesis	Kristina Dovidaitytė; Neringa Karosaitė	Aivaras Kvedarauskas; Jūratė Prevelienė
2001	Aivaras Kvedarauskas	Neringa Karosaitė	Aivaras Kvedarauskas; Juozas Spelveris	Kristina Dovidaitytė; Neringa Karosaitė	Aivaras Kvedarauskas; Ligita Zakauskaitė
2002	Aivaras Kvedarauskas	Erika Milikauskaitė	Aivaras Kvedarauskas; Kęstutis Navickas	Kristina Dovidaitytė; Neringa Karosaitė	Aivaras Kvedarauskas; Jūratė Prevelienė
2003	Aivaras Kvedarauskas	Ugnė Urbonaitė	Aivaras Kvedarauskas; Dainius Mikalauskas	Ugnė Urbonaitė; Kristina Dovidaitytė	Aivaras Kvedarauskas; Ugnė Urbonaitė
2004	Kęstutis Navickas	Ugnė Urbonaitė	Kęstutis Navickas; Klaudijus Kasinskis	Ugnė Urbonaitė; Akvilė Stapušaitytė	Kęstutis Navickas; Ugnė Urbonaitė
2005	Kęstutis Navickas	Ugnė Urbonaitė	Kęstutis Navickas; Klaudijus Kasinskis	Ugnė Urbonaitė; Akvilė Stapušaitytė	Donatas Narvilas; Kristina Dovidaitytė
2006	Šarūnas Bilius	Akvilė Stapušaitytė	Deividas Butkus; Klaudijus Kašinskis	Akvilė Stapušaitytė; Ligita Žukauskaitė	Donatas Narvilas; Kristina Dovidaitytė
2007	Kęstutis Navickas	Akvilė Stapušaitytė	Kęstutis Navickas; Klaudijus Kašinskis	Gerda Voitechovskaja; Kristina Dovidaitytė	Kęstutis Navickas; Indrė Starevičiūtė
2008	Kęstutis Navickas	Akvilė Stapušaitytė	Paulius Geležiūnas; Ramūnas Stapušaitis	Gerda Voitechovskaja; Kristina Dovidaitytė	Kęstutis Navickas; Akvilė Stapušaitytė
2009	Kęstutis Navickas	Akvilė Stapušaitytė	Kęstutis Navickas; Klaudijus Kašinskis	Akvilė Stapušaitytė; Ligita Žukauskaitė	Kęstutis Navickas; Akvilė Stapušaitytė
2010	Kęstutis Navickas	Akvilė Stapušaitytė	Kęstutis Navickas; Klaudijus Kašinskis	Gerda Voitechovskaja; Kristina Dovidaitytė	Donatas Narvilas; Kristina Dovydaitytė
2011	Kęstutis Navickas	Akvilė Stapušaitytė	Kęstutis Navickas; Edgaras Slušnys	Gerda Voitechovskaja; Kristina Dovidaitytė	Ramūnas Stapušaitis; Akvilė Stapušaitytė
2012	Povilas Bartušis	Akvilė Stapušaitytė	Alan Plavin; Povilas Bartušis	Gerda Voitechovskaja; Akvilė Stapušaitytė	Ramūnas Stapušaitis; Akvilė Stapušaitytė
2013	Kęstutis Navickas	Akvilė Stapušaitytė	Kęstutis Navickas; Povilas Bartušis	Vytautė Fomkinaitė; Akvilė Stapušaitytė	Kęstutis Navickas; Akvilė Stapušaitytė
2014	Kęstutis Navickas	Akvilė Stapušaitytė	Alan Plavin; Povilas Bartušis	Vytautė Fomkinaitė; Akvilė Stapušaitytė	Ramūnas Stapušaitis; Akvilė Stapušaitytė
2015	Kęstutis Navickas	Akvilė Stapušaitytė	Kęstutis Navickas; Povilas Bartušis	Ligita Žukauskaitė; Akvilė Stapušaitytė	Povilas Bartušis; Vytautė Fomkinaitė
2016	Kęstutis Navickas	Vytautė Fomkinaitė	Kęstutis Navickas; Povilas Bartušis	Rebeka Aleksevičiūtė; Gerda Voitechovskaja	Povilas Bartušis; Vytautė Fomkinaitė
2017	Kęstutis Navickas	Akvilė Stapušaitytė	Kęstutis Navickas; Povilas Bartušis	Vytautė Fomkinaitė; Akvilė Stapušaitytė	Povilas Bartušis; Vaiva Žymantaitė
2018	Povilas Bartušis	Vytautė Fomkinaitė	Kazimieras Dauskurtas; Povilas Bartušis	Vytautė Fomkinaitė; Ieva Sendžikaitė	Mark Šames; Vytautė Fomkinaitė
2019	Povilas Bartušis	Gerda Voitechovskaja	Mark Šames; Povilas Bartušis	Rebeka Aleksevičiūtė; Gerda Voitechovskaja	Povilas Bartušis; Samanta Golubickaitė
2020	Danielius Beržanskis	Samanta Golubickaitė	Danielius Beržanskis; Jonas Petkus	Rebeka Aleksevičiūtė; Gabija Mockutė	Giedrius Dima; Ieva Gaidė
2021	Mark Šames	Vytautė Fomkinaitė	Danielius Beržanskis; Jonas Petkus	Rebeka Aleksevičiūtė; Gabija Mockutė	Mark Šames; Vytautė Fomkinaitė
2022	Danielius Beržanskis	Samanta Golubickaitė	Danielius Beržanskis; Jonas Petkus	Jogailė Kelečiūtė; Monika Sukackaitė	Vilius Bagdanavičius; Samanta Golubickaitė
2023	Jonas Petkus	Samanta Golubickaitė	Danielius Beržanskis; Jonas Petkus	Samanta Golubickaitė; Vytautė Fomkinaitė	Povilas Bartušis; Viltė Paulauskaitė
2024	Jonas Petkus	Viltė Paulauskaitė	Danielius Beržanskis; Jonas Petkus	Monika Sukackaite; Viltė Paulauskaitė	Edgaras Slušnys; Vaida Slušnienė
