= 2008 European Men's and Women's Team Badminton Championships =

Tournament details
- Dates: 12-17 February 2008
- Venue: Topsportcentrum Almere
- Location: Almere, Netherlands

The 2008 European Men's and Women's Team Badminton Championships was held in Almere, the Netherlands, from February 12 to February 17, 2008, and was organised by the Badminton Europe and the Nederlandse Badminton Bond.

The tournament was double as 2008 Thomas Cup and Uber Cup qualification tournament, where the top three teams for each competitions qualified automatically.

== Medalists ==
Event	Gold	Silver	Bronze
Men's Team	Denmark	England	Germany
Women's Team	Denmark	Netherlands	Germany

== Men's team ==
=== Group stage ===
==== Group A ====
Pos	Team	Pld	W	L	MF	MA	MD	GF	GA	GD	PF	PA	PD	Pts	Qualification	Denmark	Scotland	Israel
1	Denmark	2	2	0	9	1	+8	18	3	+15	432	283	+149	2	Knockout stage	—	4–1	5–0
2	Scotland	2	1	1	5	5	0	12	10	+2	403	387	+16	1			—	
3	Israel	2	0	2	1	9	−8	2	19	−17	268	433	−165	0			1–4	—

Source: BWF

==== Group B ====
Pos	Team	Pld	W	L	MF	MA	MD	GF	GA	GD	PF	PA	PD	Pts	Qualification	England	Finland	Lithuania
1	England	2	2	0	9	1	+8	18	4	+14	453	291	+162	2	Knockout stage	—	5–0	4–1
2	Finland	2	1	1	4	6	−2	10	12	−2	372	390	−18	1			—	
3	Lithuania	2	0	2	2	8	−6	4	16	−12	251	395	−144	0			1–4	—

Source: BWF

==== Group C ====
Pos	Team	Pld	W	L	MF	MA	MD	GF	GA	GD	PF	PA	PD	Pts	Qualification	Germany	Estonia	Hungary	Norway
1	Germany	3	3	0	15	0	+15	30	2	+28	667	398	+269	3	Knockout stage	—	5–0	5–0	5–0
2	Estonia	3	2	1	6	9	−3	16	19	−3	593	663	−70	2			—	3–2	3–2
3	Hungary	3	1	2	5	10	−5	11	22	−11	513	598	−85	1				—	3–2
4	Norway	3	0	3	4	11	−7	10	24	−14	537	651	−114	0					—

Source: BWF

==== Group D ====
Pos	Team	Pld	W	L	MF	MA	MD	GF	GA	GD	PF	PA	PD	Pts	Qualification	Poland	Portugal	Bulgaria	Belgium
1	Poland	3	3	0	12	3	+9	24	8	+16	635	492	+143	3	Knockout stage	—	3–2	4–1	5–0
2	Portugal	3	1	2	7	8	−1	16	17	−1	542	608	−66	1			—	3–2	2–3
3	Bulgaria	3	1	2	6	9	−3	13	18	−5	543	576	−33	1				—	3–2
4	Belgium	3	1	2	5	10	−5	12	22	−10	581	625	−44	1					—

Source: BWF

==== Group E ====
Pos	Team	Pld	W	L	MF	MA	MD	GF	GA	GD	PF	PA	PD	Pts	Qualification	Sweden	France	Italy	Greece
1	Sweden	3	3	0	13	2	+11	26	5	+21	615	418	+197	3	Knockout stage	—	3–2	5–0	5–0
2	France	3	2	1	12	3	+9	24	7	+17	611	440	+171	2			—	5–0	5–0
3	Italy	3	1	2	5	10	−5	11	21	−10	509	589	−80	1				—	5–0
4	Greece	3	0	3	0	15	−15	2	30	−28	377	665	−288	0					—

Source: BWF

==== Group F ====
Pos	Team	Pld	W	L	MF	MA	MD	GF	GA	GD	PF	PA	PD	Pts	Qualification	Netherlands	Ukraine	Ireland	Slovakia
1	Netherlands (H)	3	3	0	14	1	+13	28	3	+25	652	464	+188	3	Knockout stage	—	5–0	5–0	5–0
2	Ukraine	3	2	1	9	6	+3	20	14	+6	627	594	+33	2			—	3–2	5–0
3	Ireland	3	1	2	5	10	−5	11	21	−10	548	594	−46	1				—	3–2
4	Slovakia	3	0	3	2	13	−11	6	27	−21	498	673	−175	0					—

Source: BWF
(H) Host

==== Group G ====
Pos	Team	Pld	W	L	MF	MA	MD	GF	GA	GD	PF	PA	PD	Pts	Qualification	Russia	Spain	Iceland	Turkey
1	Russia	3	3	0	14	1	+13	29	6	+23	698	530	+168	3	Knockout stage	—	4–1	5–0	5–0
2	Spain	3	2	1	10	5	+5	22	12	+10	669	561	+108	2			—	4–1	5–0
3	Iceland	3	1	2	4	11	−7	11	24	−13	586	683	−97	1				—	3–2
4	Turkey	3	0	3	2	13	−11	6	26	−20	467	646	−179	0					—

Source: BWF

==== Group H ====
Pos	Team	Pld	W	L	MF	MA	MD	GF	GA	GD	PF	PA	PD	Pts	Qualification	Wales	Czech Republic	Austria	Switzerland
1	Wales	3	3	0	10	5	+5	20	12	+8	596	545	+51	3	Knockout stage	—	3–2	3–2	4–1
2	Czech Republic	3	2	1	8	7	+1	18	14	+4	563	582	−19	2			—	3–2	3–2
3	Austria	3	1	2	7	8	−1	17	17	0	617	586	+31	1				—	3–2
4	Switzerland	3	0	3	5	10	−5	11	23	−12	594	657	−63	0					—

Source: BWF

=== Knockout stage ===
Quarter-finals
15 February 2008
Denmark	3
Sweden	0
Germany	3
Wales	0
Netherlands	2
Poland	3
Russia	0
England	3

Semi-finals
16 February 2008
Denmark	3
Germany	1
Poland	0
England	3

Final
17 February 2008
Denmark	3
England	0
Third place
17 February 2008
Germany	3
Poland	1

=== Final ranking ===
Pos	Team	Pld	W	L	Pts	MD	GD	PD	Final result
1st place, gold medalist(s)	Denmark	5	5	0	5	+16	+27	+264	Champions
2nd place, silver medalist(s)	England	5	4	1	4	+11	+19	+214	Runners-up
3rd place, bronze medalist(s)	Germany	6	5	1	5	+18	+34	+288	Third place
4	Poland	6	4	2	4	+5	+9	+76	Fourth place
5	Netherlands (H)	4	3	1	3	+12	+22	+179	Eliminated in quarter-finals
6	Russia	4	3	1	3	+10	+19	+141	Eliminated in quarter-finals
7	Sweden	4	3	1	3	+8	+16	+144	Eliminated in quarter-finals
8	Wales	4	3	1	3	+2	+4	+21	Eliminated in quarter-finals
9	France	3	2	1	2	+9	+17	+171	Eliminated in group stage
10	Spain	3	2	1	2	+5	+10	+108	Eliminated in group stage
11	Ukraine	3	2	1	2	+3	+6	+33	Eliminated in group stage
12	Czech Republic	3	2	1	2	+1	+4	−19	Eliminated in group stage
13	Estonia	3	2	1	2	−3	−3	−70	Eliminated in group stage
14	Scotland	2	1	1	1	0	+2	+16	Eliminated in group stage
15	Austria	3	1	2	1	−1	0	+31	Eliminated in group stage
16	Finland	2	1	1	1	−2	−2	−18	Eliminated in group stage
17	Portugal	3	1	2	1	−1	−1	−66	Eliminated in group stage
18	Bulgaria	3	1	2	1	−3	−5	−33	Eliminated in group stage
19	Belgium	3	1	2	1	−5	−10	−44	Eliminated in group stage
20	Ireland	3	1	2	1	−5	−10	−46	Eliminated in group stage
21	Italy	3	1	2	1	−5	−10	−80	Eliminated in group stage
22	Hungary	3	1	2	1	−5	−11	−85	Eliminated in group stage
23	Iceland	3	1	2	1	−7	−13	−97	Eliminated in group stage
24	Switzerland	3	0	3	0	−5	−12	−63	Eliminated in group stage
25	Lithuania	2	0	2	0	−6	−12	−144	Eliminated in group stage
26	Norway	3	0	3	0	−7	−14	−114	Eliminated in group stage
27	Israel	2	0	2	0	−8	−17	−165	Eliminated in group stage
28	Slovakia	3	0	3	0	−11	−21	−175	Eliminated in group stage
29	Turkey	3	0	3	0	−11	−20	−179	Eliminated in group stage
30	Greece	3	0	3	0	−15	−28	−288	Eliminated in group stage

== Women's team ==
=== Group stage ===
==== Group A ====
Pos	Team	Pld	W	L	MF	MA	MD	GF	GA	GD	PF	PA	PD	Pts	Qualification	Germany	Iceland	Italy	Wales
1	Germany	3	3	0	15	0	+15	30	1	+29	649	299	+350	3	Knockout stage	—	5–0	5–0	5–0
2	Iceland	3	2	1	8	7	+1	17	15	+2	538	544	−6	2			—	3–2	5–0
3	Italy	3	1	2	5	10	−5	12	20	−8	479	583	−104	1				—	3–2
4	Wales	3	0	3	2	13	−11	4	27	−23	386	626	−240	0					—

Source: BWF

==== Group B ====
Pos	Team	Pld	W	L	MF	MA	MD	GF	GA	GD	PF	PA	PD	Pts	Qualification	England	Sweden	Spain
1	England	2	2	0	10	0	+10	20	1	+19	436	286	+150	2	Knockout stage	—	5–0	5–0
2	Sweden	2	1	1	5	5	0	11	11	0	392	377	+15	1			—	5–0
3	Spain	2	0	2	0	10	−10	1	20	−19	272	437	−165	0				—

Source: BWF

==== Group C ====
Pos	Team	Pld	W	L	MF	MA	MD	GF	GA	GD	PF	PA	PD	Pts	Qualification	France	Ukraine	Switzerland	Austria
1	France	3	2	1	11	4	+7	23	9	+14	632	488	+144	2	Knockout stage	—	4–1	2–3	5–0
2	Ukraine	3	2	1	9	6	+3	21	15	+6	666	612	+54	2			—	3–2	5–0
3	Switzerland	3	2	1	8	7	+1	19	17	+2	636	657	−21	2				—	3–2
4	Austria	3	0	3	2	13	−11	6	28	−22	509	686	−177	0					—

Source: BWF

==== Group D ====
Pos	Team	Pld	W	L	MF	MA	MD	GF	GA	GD	PF	PA	PD	Pts	Qualification	Russia	Finland	Belgium	Ireland
1	Russia	3	3	0	15	0	+15	30	0	+30	631	320	+311	3	Knockout stage	—	5–0	5–0	5–0
2	Finland	3	2	1	8	7	+1	16	17	−1	591	642	−51	2			—	4–1	4–1
3	Belgium	3	1	2	5	10	−5	13	23	−10	584	711	−127	1				—	4–1
4	Ireland	3	0	3	2	13	−11	8	27	−19	559	692	−133	0					—

Source: BWF

==== Group E ====
Pos	Team	Pld	W	L	MF	MA	MD	GF	GA	GD	PF	PA	PD	Pts	Qualification	Denmark	Belarus	Czech Republic	Estonia
1	Denmark	3	3	0	15	0	+15	30	3	+27	687	476	+211	3	Knockout stage	—	5–0	5–0	5–0
2	Belarus	3	2	1	9	6	+3	19	14	+5	610	565	+45	2			—	4–1	5–0
3	Czech Republic	3	1	2	4	11	−7	12	25	−13	613	716	−103	1				—	3–2
4	Estonia	3	0	3	2	13	−11	8	27	−19	533	686	−153	0					—

Source: BWF

==== Group F ====
Pos	Team	Pld	W	L	MF	MA	MD	GF	GA	GD	PF	PA	PD	Pts	Qualification	Netherlands	Poland	Portugal	Turkey
1	Netherlands (H)	3	3	0	15	0	+15	30	0	+30	632	321	+311	3	Knockout stage	—	5–0	5–0	5–0
2	Poland	3	2	1	8	7	+1	17	15	+2	576	559	+17	2			—	4–1	4–1
3	Portugal	3	1	2	5	10	−5	10	20	−10	449	574	−125	1				—	4–1
4	Turkey	3	0	3	2	13	−11	5	27	−22	458	661	−203	0					—

Source: BWF
(H) Host

==== Group G ====
Pos	Team	Pld	W	L	MF	MA	MD	GF	GA	GD	PF	PA	PD	Pts	Qualification	Scotland	Bulgaria	Slovakia	Lithuania
1	Scotland	3	3	0	14	1	+13	29	2	+27	643	402	+241	3	Knockout stage	—	4–1	5–0	5–0
2	Bulgaria	3	2	1	11	4	+7	22	10	+12	623	485	+138	2			—	5–0	5–0
3	Slovakia	3	1	2	3	12	−9	7	24	−17	457	578	−121	1				—	3–2
4	Lithuania	3	0	3	2	13	−11	5	27	−22	382	640	−258	0					—

Source: BWF

=== Knockout stage ===
Quarter-finals
15 February 2008
Germany
BYE
Russia	0
Denmark	3
Scotland	3
France	2
England	1
Netherlands	3

Semi-finals
16 February 2008
Germany	1
Denmark	3
Scotland	0
Netherlands	3

Final
17 February 2008
Denmark	3
Netherlands	0
Third place
17 February 2008
Germany	3
Scotland	1

=== Final ranking ===
Pos	Team	Pld	W	L	Pts	MD	GD	PD	Final result
1st place, gold medalist(s)	Denmark	6	6	0	6	+23	+39	+295	Champions
2nd place, silver medalist(s)	Netherlands (H)	6	5	1	5	+17	+35	+355	Runners-up
3rd place, bronze medalist(s)	Germany	6	5	1	5	+15	+31	+358	Third place
4	Scotland	6	4	2	4	+9	+20	+167	Fourth place
5	Russia	4	3	1	3	+12	+25	+291	Eliminated in quarter-finals
6	France	4	3	1	3	+6	+11	+136	Eliminated in quarter-finals
7	England	3	2	1	2	+8	+15	+116	Eliminated in quarter-finals
9	Bulgaria	3	2	1	2	+7	+12	+138	Eliminated in group stage
10	Ukraine	3	2	1	2	+3	+6	+54	Eliminated in group stage
11	Belarus	3	2	1	2	+3	+5	+45	Eliminated in group stage
12	Poland	3	2	1	2	+1	+2	+17	Eliminated in group stage
13	Iceland	3	2	1	2	+1	+2	−6	Eliminated in group stage
14	Switzerland	3	2	1	2	+1	+2	−21	Eliminated in group stage
15	Finland	3	2	1	2	+1	−1	−51	Eliminated in group stage
16	Sweden	2	1	1	1	0	0	+15	Eliminated in group stage
17	Italy	3	1	2	1	−5	−8	−104	Eliminated in group stage
18	Czech Republic	3	1	2	1	−7	−13	−103	Eliminated in group stage
19	Portugal	3	1	2	1	−5	−10	−125	Eliminated in group stage
20	Belgium	3	1	2	1	−5	−10	−127	Eliminated in group stage
21	Slovakia	3	1	2	1	−9	−17	−121	Eliminated in group stage
22	Spain	2	0	2	0	−10	−19	−165	Eliminated in group stage
23	Ireland	3	0	3	0	−11	−19	−133	Eliminated in group stage
24	Estonia	3	0	3	0	−11	−19	−153	Eliminated in group stage
25	Austria	3	0	3	0	−11	−22	−177	Eliminated in group stage
26	Turkey	3	0	3	0	−11	−22	−203	Eliminated in group stage
27	Lithuania	3	0	3	0	−11	−22	−258	Eliminated in group stage
28	Wales	3	0	3	0	−11	−23	−240	Eliminated in group stage
