= Kęstutis Navickas =

Lithuanian badminton player (born 1984)

Personal information
- Born: January 13, 1984 (age 42) Kaunas, Lithuanian SSR, Soviet Union
- Years active: 1999 – 2017
- Height: 1.78 m (5 ft 10 in)
- Weight: 71 kg (157 lb; 11.2 st)

Sport
- Country: Lithuania
- Sport: Badminton
- Handedness: Right

Men's singles
- Highest ranking: 38 (April 21, 2011)
- BWF profile
Medal record
Men's badminton
Representing Lithuania
European Games
Bronze medal – third place	2015 Baku	Men's singles

Kęstutis Navickas (born January 13, 1984) is a badminton player from Lithuania. He competed at the 2008 Olympic Games in Beijing, China. Navickas was the bronze medalist at the 2015 Baku European Games in the men's singles event. Currently Navickas serves as Head of Coaches Council in Lithuanian Badminton Federation. His is as of March 2022 the Singles Head Coach for the French Badminton.

Navickas played in the German club TV Refrath from 2005-2006 after that he change to the team of Gifhon.

He won the Lithuanian National Badminton Championships in 2004, 2005, 2007 and 2008. He competed at the 2006 IBF World Championships and lost in the second round against Taufik Hidayat.

In 2025 Kęstutis Navickas won BEC Award for Coach of the Year.

== Achievements ==
=== European Games ===
Men's singles
Year	Venue	Opponent	Score	Result
2015	Baku Sports Hall; Baku, Azerbaijan	(Spain) Pablo Abián	22–20, 16–21, 13–21	Bronze

=== BWF International Challenge/Series ===
Men's singles
Year	Tournament	Opponent	Score	Result
2015	Lithuanian International	(Czech Republic) Adam Mendrek	20–22, 21–6, 18–21	(silver) Runner-up
2012	Bulgarian International	(Austria) David Obernosterer	22–20, 15–21, 21–13	(gold) Winner
2011	Lithuanian International	(Republic of Ireland) Scott Evans	21–17, 12–21, 21–11	(gold) Winner
2010	Bulgarian International	(Poland) Przemyslaw Wacha	14–21, 21–11, 13–21	(silver) Runner-up
2010	Canadian International	(France) Brice Leverdez	21–16, 18–21, 21–14	(gold) Winner
2008	Iran Fajr International	(Malaysia) Mohd Arif Abdul Latif	18–21, 18–21	(silver) Runner-up
2008	Uganda International	(Sri Lanka) Niluka Karunaratne	21–19, 21–13	(gold) Winner
2006	Estonian International	(Wales) Richard Vaughan	22–20, 15–21, 21–11	(gold) Winner
2006	Lithuanian International	(Spain) Pablo Abian	21–15, 21–12	(gold) Winner
2005	Latvia Riga International	(France) Simon Maunoury	7–15, 7–15	(silver) Runner-up

Mixed doubles
Year	Tournament	Partner	Opponent	Score	Result
2005	Latvia Riga International	(Poland) Kamila Augustyn	(France) Jean-Michel Lefort (Lithuania) Akvile Stapusaityte	15–10, 15–7	(gold) Winner

BWF International Challenge tournament
BWF International Series tournament
BWF Future Series tournament
