= 2008 European Women's Team Badminton Championships knockout stage =

This article lists the full results for knockout stage of 2008 European Women's Team Badminton Championships.

== Bracket ==
Quarter-finals
15 February 2008
Germany
BYE
Russia	0
Denmark	3
Scotland	3
France	2
England	1
Netherlands	3

Semi-finals
16 February 2008
Germany	1
Denmark	3
Scotland	0
Netherlands	3

Final
17 February 2008
Denmark	3
Netherlands	0
Third place
17 February 2008
Germany	3
Scotland	1

== Quarter-finals ==
=== Russia vs. Denmark ===
Russia
0
Topsportcentrum Almere, Court 3
15 February 2008, 12:00 UTC+1

Denmark
3

			1	2	3
1	(Russia) (Denmark)	Ella Diehl; Tine Rasmussen	12; 21	9; 21
2	(Russia) (Denmark)	Ekaterina Ananina; Camilla Sørensen	20; 22	21; 7	17; 21
3	(Russia) (Denmark)	Valeria Sorokina / Nina Vislova; Kamilla Rytter Juhl / Marie Røpke	16; 21	19; 21
4	(Russia) (Denmark)	Tatjana Bibik; Nanna Brosolat Jensen				not played
5	(Russia) (Denmark)	Ekaterina Ananina / Anastasia Russkikh; Helle Nielsen / Tine Rasmussen				not played

=== Scotland vs. France ===
Scotland
3
Topsportcentrum Almere, Court 4
15 February 2008, 12:00 UTC+1

France
2

			1	2	3
1	(Scotland) (France)	Susan Hughes; Pi Hongyan	21; 17	8; 21	9; 21
2	(Scotland) (France)	Linda Sloan; Weny Rahmawati	21; 13	21; 16
3	(Scotland) (France)	Yuan Wemyss; Élisa Chanteur	21; 12	21; 12
4	(Scotland) (France)	Jillie Cooper / Susan Hughes; Laura Choinet / Pi Hongyan	12; 21	19; 21
5	(Scotland) (France)	Imogen Bankier / Yuan Wemyss; Élodie Eymard / Weny Rahmawati	21; 18	21; 15

=== Netherlands vs. England ===
Netherlands
3
Topsportcentrum Almere, Court 2
15 February 2008, 12:00 UTC+1

England
1

			1	2	3
1	(Netherlands) (England)	Judith Meulendijks; Tracey Hallam	21; 9	11; 3		retired
2	(Netherlands) (England)	Rachel van Cutsen; Elizabeth Cann	21; 18	21; 14
3	(Netherlands) (England)	Judith Meulendijks / Yao Jie; Gail Emms / Jenny Wallwork	19; 21	17; 21
4	(Netherlands) (England)	Karina de Wit; Jill Pittard	21; 19	21; 13
5	(Netherlands) (England)	Rachel van Cutsen / Paulien van Dooremalen; Joanne Nicholas / Natalie Munt				not played

== Semi-finals ==
=== Germany vs. Denmark ===
Germany
1
Topsportcentrum Almere, Court 2
16 February 2008, 12:00 UTC+1

Denmark
3

			1	2	3
1	(Germany) (Denmark)	Juliane Schenk; Tine Rasmussen	21; 17	15; 21	17; 21
2	(Germany) (Denmark)	Carina Mette / Birgit Overzier; Lena Frier Kristiansen / Christinna Pedersen	21; 19	21; 15
3	(Germany) (Denmark)	Janet Köhler; Camilla Sørensen	12; 21	12; 21
4	(Germany) (Denmark)	Kathrin Piotrowski / Juliane Schenk; Kamilla Rytter Juhl / Marie Røpke	17; 21	16; 21
5	(Germany) (Denmark)	Petra Reichel; Nanna Brosolat Jensen				not played

=== Scotland vs. Netherlands ===
Scotland
0
Topsportcentrum Almere, Court 1
16 February 2008, 12:00 UTC+1

Netherlands
3

			1	2	3
1	(Scotland) (Netherlands)	Susan Hughes; Judith Meulendijks	21; 18	7; 21	16; 21
2	(Scotland) (Netherlands)	Linda Sloan; Rachel van Cutsen	6; 21	14; 21
3	(Scotland) (Netherlands)	Yuan Wemyss; Karina de Wit	18; 21	13; 21
4	(Scotland) (Netherlands)	Imogen Bankier / Yuan Wemyss; Judith Meulendijks / Yao Jie				not played
5	(Scotland) (Netherlands)	Jillie Cooper / Susan Hughes; Karina de Wit / Rachel van Cutsen				not played

== Third place play-off ==
=== Germany vs. Scotland ===
Germany
3
Topsportcentrum Almere, Court 1
17 February 2008, 10:00 UTC+1

Scotland
1

			1	2	3
1	(Germany) (Scotland)	Huaiwen Xu; Susan Hughes	12; 21	21; 18	19; 21
2	(Germany) (Scotland)	Juliane Schenk; Linda Sloan	21; 6	21; 19
3	(Germany) (Scotland)	Petra Reichel; Yuan Wemyss	21; 15	21; 16
4	(Germany) (Scotland)	Birgit Overzier / Michaela Peiffer; Jillie Cooper / Susan Hughes	21; 12	21; 17
5	(Germany) (Scotland)	Kathrin Piotrowski / Juliane Schenk; Imogen Bankier / Yuan Wemyss				not played

== Final ==
=== Denmark vs. Netherlands ===
Denmark
3
Topsportcentrum Almere, Court 1
17 February 2008, 12:30 UTC+1

Netherlands
1

			1	2	3
1	(Denmark) (Netherlands)	Tine Rasmussen; Judith Meulendijks	21; 13	21; 14
2	(Denmark) (Netherlands)	Camilla Sørensen; Rachel van Cutsen	21; 19	19; 21	21; 23
3	(Denmark) (Netherlands)	Helle Nielsen / Marie Røpke; Eefje Muskens / Yao Jie	21; 12	21; 14
4	(Denmark) (Netherlands)	Nanna Brosolat Jensen; Karina de Wit	21; 14	19; 21	21; 16
5	(Denmark) (Netherlands)	Lena Frier Kristiansen / Kamilla Rytter Juhl; Rachel van Cutsen / Paulien van Dooremalen				not played
