= Akvilė Stapušaitytė =

Lithuanian badminton player (born 1986)

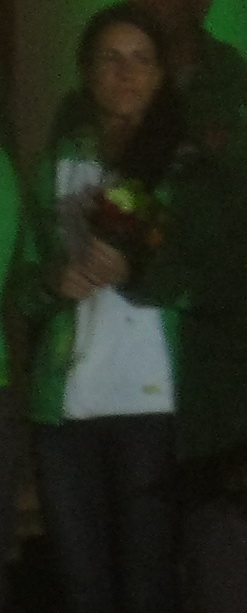
- Stapušaitytė in 2012

Personal information
- Born: 25 March 1986 (age 40) Tauragė, Lithuanian SSR, Soviet Union
- Height: 169 cm (5 ft 7 in)
- Weight: 58 kg (128 lb)

Sport
- Country: Lithuania
- Sport: Badminton
- Handedness: Right
- Coached by: Juozas Špelveris

Women's singles
- Highest ranking: 74 (28 April 2016)
- BWF profile

Akvilė Stapušaitytė (born 25 March 1986) is a Lithuanian badminton player. She was born in Tauragė.

== Career ==
Stapušaitytė won the Lithuanian National Badminton Championships in 2006–2014. Lithuania Open title winner. She attended the 2008 Summer Olympics and lost to Tine Rasmussen in the second round. She also represented Lithuania in 2012 Summer Olympics where she was eliminated after group stage.

=== Media ===
Stapušaitytė was nominated among most charming sportswomen of 2013 in Lithuania. In 2014, she was on the cover of SportIN magazine.

== Achievements ==
=== BWF International Challenge/Series ===
Women's singles
| Year | Tournament | Opponent | Score | Result |
|---|---|---|---|---|
| 2011 | Iceland International | (Iceland) Ragna Ingólfsdóttir | 18–21, 21–17, 17–21 | (silver) Runner-up |
| 2013 | Lithuanian International | (Denmark) Anne Hald Jensen | 21–18, 21–15 | (gold) Winner |
| 2014 | Iceland International | (Finland) Airi Mikkelä | 14–21, 21–18, 11–21 | (silver) Runner-up |
| 2014 | Norwegian International | (Denmark) Mia Blichfeldt | 18–21, 17–21 | (silver) Runner-up |
| 2015 | Riga International | (Russia) Anastasia Chervyakova | 26–24, 14–21, 12–21 | (silver) Runner-up |
| 2016 | Jamaica International | (Italy) Jeanine Cicognini | 16–21, 20–22 | (silver) Runner-up |
| 2017 | Hatzor International | (Russia) Anastasiia Semenova | 12–21, 8–21 | (silver) Runner-up |

Women's doubles
| Year | Tournament | Partner | Opponent | Score | Result |
|---|---|---|---|---|---|
| 2005 | Lithuanian International | (Lithuania) Kristina Dovidaitytė | (Finland) Jenny Sjölund (Finland) Elina Väisänen | 15–12, 15–7 | (gold) Winner |
| 2006 | Lithuanian International | (Latvia) Kristīne Šefere | (Russia) Anastasia Prokopenko (Russia) Elena Chernyavskaya | 10–21, 21–15, 14–21 | (silver) Runner-up |
| 2007 | Kalev International | (Poland) Anna Narel | (Spain) Lucia Tavera (Spain) Sandra Chirlaque | 20–22, 23–21, 18–21 | (silver) Runner-up |

Mixed doubles
| Year | Tournament | Partner | Opponent | Score | Result |
|---|---|---|---|---|---|
| 2005 | Estonian International | (France) Jean-Michel Lefort | (Finland) Petri Hyyryläinen (Finland) Elina Väisänen | 15–6, 17–14 | (gold) Winner |
| 2005 | Latvia Riga International | (France) Jean-Michel Lefort | (Lithuania) Kęstutis Navickas (Poland) Kamila Augustyn | 10–15, 7–15 | (silver) Runner-up |

BWF International Challenge tournament
BWF International Series tournament
BWF Future Series tournament
