= Erin Keery =

Northern Irish international badminton player

Personal information
- Nationality: British (Northern Irish)
- Born: 16 February 1988

Sport
- Sport: Badminton
- Club: Alpha BC, Lisburn
Medal record
Representing Northern Ireland
Irish Nationals
Gold medal – first place	2005	singles

Erin Keery (born 16 February 1988), is a former international badminton player from Northern Ireland who competed at the Commonwealth Games and was a singles champion of Ireland.

== Biography ==
Keery was a member of the Alpha Badminton Club of Lisburn and represented Ulster at provincial level. She represented Ireland at various age-levels won multiple age level events including two U19 titles at the East of Scotland Championships, and represented the all-Ireland team at international level.

Keery represented the 2006 Northern Irish team at the 2006 Commonwealth Games in Melbourne, Australia, where she competed in three events.

She was a singles Irish champion at the Irish National Badminton Championships, winning the title in 2005.
