= Magnus Sahlberg =

Swedish badminton player (born 1984)

Personal information
- Born: Magnus Sahlberg; 17 February 1984 (age 42) Gothenburg, Sweden
- Height: 1.80 m (5 ft 11 in)

Sport
- Country: Sweden
- Sport: Badminton
- Coached by: Johan Blom

Men's singles
- Highest ranking: 50 (9 September 2007)
- BWF profile

Magnus Sahlberg (born 17 February 1984) is a Swedish badminton player. He won the men's singles title at the National Championships in 2008, and in the men's doubles event in 2012. He also won the international level tournament at the 2006 Iceland International and 2009 Portugal International.

== Achievements ==
=== BWF International Challenge/Series ===
Men's singles
Year	Tournament	Opponent	Score	Result
2009	Hungarian International	(Germany) Dieter Domke	14–21, 10–21	(silver) Runner-up
2009	Portugal International	(Denmark) Christian Lind Thomsen	21–11, 21–16	(gold) Winner
2006	Iceland International	(Portugal) Marco Vasconcelos	21–16, 18–21, 21–11	(gold) Winner

Men's doubles
Year	Tournament	Partner	Opponent	Score	Result
2012	Turkey International	(Sweden) Mattias Wigardt	(Scotland) Robert Blair (Malaysia) Tan Bin Shen	11–21, 15–21	(silver) Runner-up

BWF International Challenge tournament
BWF International Series tournament
