= Lithuanian Badminton Federation =

Lithuanian Badminton Federation Lithuanian: Lietuvos badmintono federacija
- Sport: Badminton
- Category: National association
- Abbreviation: LBF
- Founded: 1962
- Affiliation: BWF
- Headquarters: Vilnius, Lithuania
- President: Algirdas Kepežinskas

Official website
- www.badminton.lt

Lithuanian Badminton Federation (Lithuanian: Lietuvos badmintono federacija) is a national governing body of badminton sport in Lithuania.

Federation also organising annual national Lithuanian National Badminton Championships and Lithuanian International.

== Structure ==
As of 2020:

- President: Algirdas Kepežinskas
- General Secretary: Tadas Ivanauskas
- Head of Coaches Council: Donatas Narvilas
- Head of Referees Council: Dainius Mazėtis
