= Mattias Wigardt =

Swedish badminton player (born 1986)

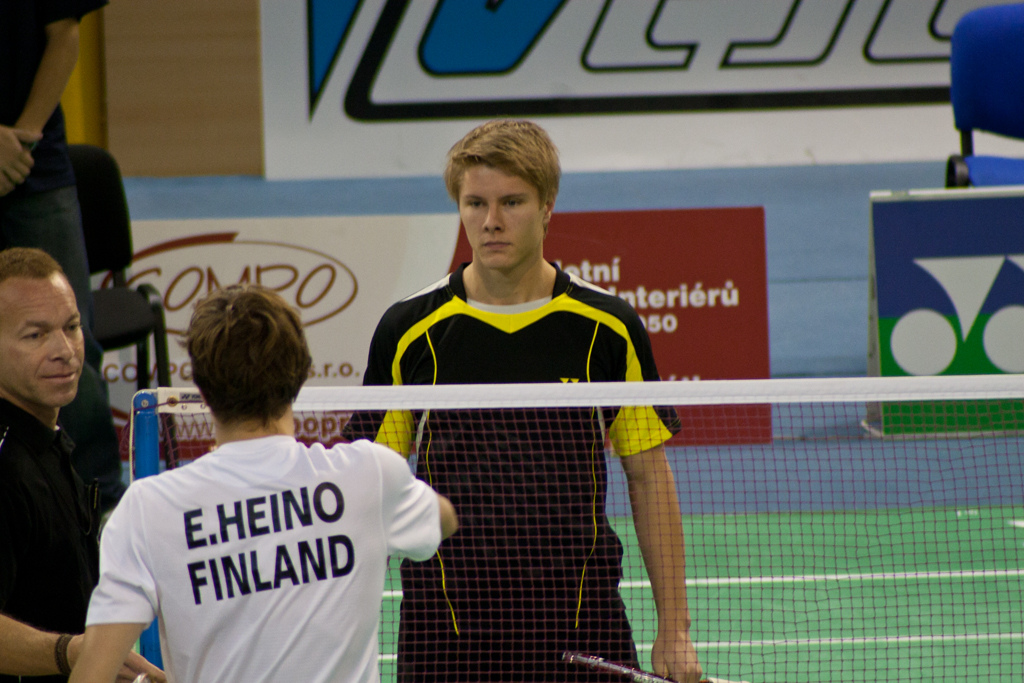
- Mattias Wigardt in Czech International 2011

Personal information
- Born: 28 June 1986 (age 40)

Sport
- Country: Sweden
- Sport: Badminton

Men's Singles & Men's Doubles
- Highest ranking: 82 (MS) 12 Nov 2009; 80 (MD) 9 Jan 2014
- BWF profile

Mattias Wigardt (born 28 June 1986) is a Swedish male badminton player.

== Achievements ==
=== BWF International Challenge/Series ===
Men's Singles

Year	Tournament	Opponent	Score	Result
2012	Irish International	(France) Maxime Michel	21-8, 21–9	(gold) Winner

Men's Doubles

Year	Tournament	Partner	Opponent	Score	Result
2012	Turkey International	(Sweden) Magnus Sahlberg	(Scotland) Robert Blair (Malaysia) Tan Bin Shen	11-21, 15–21	(silver) Runner-up

BWF International Challenge tournament
BWF International Series tournament
BWF Future Series tournament
