= 2025 Badminton Asia Mixed Team Championships =

Tournament details
- Dates: 11–16 February
- Edition: 4th
- Venue: Conson Gymnasium
- Location: Qingdao, Shandong, China

The 2025 Badminton Asia Mixed Team Championships, officially known as the Tsingtao Badminton Asia Mixed Team Championship 2025 for sponsorship reasons, was the fourth edition of the Badminton Asia Mixed Team Championships was held at the Conson Gymnasium, Qingdao, China from 11 to 16 February 2025. It was organized by Badminton Asia and hosted by the Chinese Badminton Association.

== Medalists ==
Event	Gold	Silver	Bronze
Mixed team	Indonesia; Alwi Farhan; Dejan Ferdinansyah; Muhammad Shohibul Fikri; Rahmat Hidayat; Yohanes Saut Marcellyno; Daniel Marthin; Yeremia Rambitan; Rinov Rivaldy Komang Ayu Cahya Dewi; Lisa Ayu Kusumawati; Lanny Tria Mayasari; Meilysa Trias Puspita Sari; Siti Fadia Silva Ramadhanti; Rachel Allessya Rose; Putri Kusuma Wardani	China; Chen Xujun; Gao Jiaxuan; Guo Rohan; Hu Zhe'an; Huang Di; Li Hongyi; Liu Yang; Zhu Xuanchen Bao Lijing; Chen Qingchen; Chen Yufei; Keng Shuliang; Li Huazhou; Wang Tingge; Wu Mengying; Xu Wenjing	Japan; Hiroki Midorikawa; Kenya Mitsuhashi; Hiroki Nishi; Kenta Nishimoto; Takumi Nomura; Hiroki Okamura; Yuichi Shimogami; Yushi Tanaka Arisa Igarashi; Rin Iwanaga; Tomoka Miyazaki; Kie Nakanishi; Natsu Saito; Ayako Sakuramoto; Akari Sato; Kaoru Sugiyama
Mixed team	Indonesia; Alwi Farhan; Dejan Ferdinansyah; Muhammad Shohibul Fikri; Rahmat Hidayat; Yohanes Saut Marcellyno; Daniel Marthin; Yeremia Rambitan; Rinov Rivaldy Komang Ayu Cahya Dewi; Lisa Ayu Kusumawati; Lanny Tria Mayasari; Meilysa Trias Puspita Sari; Siti Fadia Silva Ramadhanti; Rachel Allessya Rose; Putri Kusuma Wardani	China; Chen Xujun; Gao Jiaxuan; Guo Rohan; Hu Zhe'an; Huang Di; Li Hongyi; Liu Yang; Zhu Xuanchen Bao Lijing; Chen Qingchen; Chen Yufei; Keng Shuliang; Li Huazhou; Wang Tingge; Wu Mengying; Xu Wenjing	Thailand; Supak Jomkoh; Peeratchai Sukphun; Pakkapon Teeraratsakul; Panitchaphon Teeraratsakul; Chaloempon Charoenkitamorn; Ratchapol Makkasasithorn; Worrapol Thongsa-Nga; Wongsup Wongsup-in Benyapa Aimsaard; Nuntakarn Aimsaard; Pornpawee Chochuwong; Busanan Ongbamrungphan; Sapsiree Taerattanachai; Laksika Kanlaha; Nattamon Laisuan; Phataimas Muenwong

== Tournament ==
The 2025 Badminton Asia Mixed Team Championships (also known as the Tong Yun Kai Cup 2025) is the fourth edition of the Badminton Asia Mixed Team Championships, a continental badminton tournament to crown the best mixed national badminton teams in Asia. The tournament will be contested by 13 teams with Team China as the defending champions.

=== Venue ===
The tournament will be held at Conson Gymnasium in Qingdao, Shandong Province, China.

=== Seeds ===
The seeding are as follows:

1. China
2. South Korea
3. Japan
4. Indonesia

=== Draw ===
The draw took place on 17 January 2025. The group stage consisted of one four-team group and three three-team groups. The first seeded team, China, was placed in Group A, while the second seeded team, South Korea, was placed in Group D.

Group A	Group B	Group C	Group D
China; Chinese Taipei; Singapore	Indonesia; Malaysia; Hong Kong	Japan; Thailand; Kazakhstan (Note: Kazakhstan moved from Group B to Group C due to the withdrawal of Philippines.)	South Korea; India; Macau

== Group stage ==
=== Group A ===
Pos	Team	Pld	W	L	MF	MA	MD	GF	GA	GD	PF	PA	PD	Pts	Qualification
1	China (H)	2	2	0	6	4	+2	15	9	+6	454	372	+82	2	Knockout stage
2	Chinese Taipei	0	0	0	0	0	0	0	0	0	0	0	0	0	Knockout stage
3	Singapore	2	0	2	3	7	−4	7	16	−9	352	447	−95	0	

Source: BWF
(H) Host

==== China vs Singapore ====
China
3
Conson Gymnasium - Court 1
11 February 2025, 17:00 UTC+8
Report

Singapore
2

			1	2	3
1	(China) (Singapore)	Gao Jiaxuan / Wu Mengying; Terry Hee / Jin Yujia	21; 13	11; 21	18; 21
2	(China) (Singapore)	Xu Wenjing; Insyirah Khan	21; 10	21; 10
3	(China) (Singapore)	Zhu Xuanchen; Jason Teh	15; 21	15; 21
4	(China) (Singapore)	Keng Shuliang / Wang Tingge; Heng Xiao En / Li Zheng Yan	21; 9	21; 16
5	(China) (Singapore)	Huang Di / Liu Yang; Loh Kean Hean / Howin Wong	21; 10	21; 11

==== Chinese Taipei vs Singapore ====
Chinese Taipei
4
Conson Gymnasium - Court 2
12 February 2025, 17:00 UTC+8
Report

Singapore
1

			1	2	3
1	(Chinese Taipei) (Singapore)	Yang Po-hsuan / Hu Ling-fang; Terry Hee / Jin Yujia	21; 16	21; 5
2	(Chinese Taipei) (Singapore)	Hsu Wen-chi; Yeo Jia Min	18; 21	21; 19	18; 21
3	(Chinese Taipei) (Singapore)	Lin Chun-yi; Loh Kean Yew	21; 13	16; 21	21; 13
4	(Chinese Taipei) (Singapore)	Hung En-tzu / Yu Chien-hui; Heng Xiao En / Li Zheng Yan	21; 19	21; 12
5	(Chinese Taipei) (Singapore)	Chiu Hsiang-chieh / Wang Chi-lin; Wesley Koh / Junsuke Kubo	21; 11	21; 18

==== China vs Chinese Taipei ====
China
3
Conson Gymnasium - Court 1
13 February 2025, 17:00 UTC+8
Report

Chinese Taipei
2

			1	2	3
1	(China) (Chinese Taipei)	Li Hongyi / Wu Mengying; Chen Cheng-kuan / Hsu Yin-hui	21; 6	15; 21	14; 21
2	(China) (Chinese Taipei)	Chen Yufei; Huang Yu-hsun	21; 9	17; 21	21; 11
3	(China) (Chinese Taipei)	Hu Zhe'an; Lee Chia-hao	21; 18	21; 17
4	(China) (Chinese Taipei)	Keng Shuliang / Wang Tingge; Sung Shuo-yun / Yu Chien-hui	21; 14	21; 14
5	(China) (Chinese Taipei)	Chen Xujun / Guo Rohan; Lee Jhe-huei / Yang Po-hsuan	17; 21	21; 15	17; 21

=== Group B ===
Pos	Team	Pld	W	L	MF	MA	MD	GF	GA	GD	PF	PA	PD	Pts	Qualification
1	Indonesia	2	2	0	8	2	+6	18	9	+9	546	456	+90	2	Knockout stage
2	Hong Kong	2	1	1	3	7	−4	9	15	−6	408	466	−58	1	Knockout stage
3	Malaysia	2	0	2	4	6	−2	11	14	−3	450	482	−32	0	

Source: BWF

==== Indonesia vs Hong Kong ====
Indonesia
5
Conson Gymnasium - Court 2
11 February 2025, 09:30 UTC+8
Report

Hong Kong
0

			1	2	3
1	(Indonesia) (Hong Kong)	Rinov Rivaldy / Lisa Ayu Kusumawati; Lui Chun Wai / Fu Chi Yan	18; 21	21; 8	21; 19
2	(Indonesia) (Hong Kong)	Putri Kusuma Wardani; Yeung Sum Yee	21; 8	21; 15
3	(Indonesia) (Hong Kong)	Alwi Farhan; Ng Ka Long	21; 12	18; 21	21; 19
4	(Indonesia) (Hong Kong)	Lanny Tria Mayasari / Siti Fadia Silva Ramadhanti; Lui Lok Lok / Tsang Hiu Yan	21; 15	21; 17
5	(Indonesia) (Hong Kong)	Muhammad Shohibul Fikri / Daniel Marthin; Law Cheuk Him / Yeung Shing Choi	21; 19	21; 23	21; 8

==== Malaysia vs Hong Kong ====
Malaysia
2
Conson Gymnasium - Court 1
12 February 2025, 09:30 UTC+8
Report

Hong Kong
3

			1	2	3
1	(Malaysia) (Hong Kong)	Hoo Pang Ron / Cheng Su Yin; Tang Chun Man / Ng Tsz Yau	21; 17	17; 21	11; 21
2	(Malaysia) (Hong Kong)	Letshanaa Karupathevan; Saloni Samirbhai Mehta	21; 18	21; 18
3	(Malaysia) (Hong Kong)	Justin Hoh; Lee Cheuk Yiu	19; 21	16; 21
4	(Malaysia) (Hong Kong)	Go Pei Kee / Teoh Mei Xing; Yeung Nga Ting / Yeung Pui Lam	17; 21	14; 21
5	(Malaysia) (Hong Kong)	Man Wei Chong / Tee Kai Wun; Hung Kuei Chun / Lui Chun Wai	21; 13	21; 11

==== Indonesia vs Malaysia ====
Indonesia
3
Conson Gymnasium - Court 1
13 February 2025, 09:30 UTC+8
Report

Malaysia
2

			1	2	3
1	(Indonesia) (Malaysia)	Dejan Ferdinansyah / Siti Fadia Silva Ramadhanti; Goh Soon Huat / Shevon Jemie Lai	17; 21	21; 13	21; 18
2	(Indonesia) (Malaysia)	Komang Ayu Cahya Dewi; Letshanaa Karupathevan	21; 12	21; 19
3	(Indonesia) (Malaysia)	Yohanes Saut Marcellyno; Leong Jun Hao	21; 11	20; 22	12; 21
4	(Indonesia) (Malaysia)	Meilysa Trias Puspita Sari / Rachel Allessya Rose; Go Pei Kee / Teoh Mei Xing	18; 21	21; 7	21; 17
5	(Indonesia) (Malaysia)	Muhammad Shohibul Fikri / Daniel Marthin; Man Wei Chong / Tee Kai Wun	27; 25	17; 21	21; 23

=== Group C ===
Pos	Team	Pld	W	L	MF	MA	MD	GF	GA	GD	PF	PA	PD	Pts	Qualification
1	Japan	2	2	0	8	2	+6	17	5	+12	434	282	+152	2	Knockout stage
2	Thailand	2	1	1	7	3	+4	15	7	+8	422	298	+124	1	Knockout stage
3	Kazakhstan	2	0	2	0	10	−10	0	20	−20	144	420	−276	0	

Source: BWF

==== Japan vs Kazakhstan ====
Japan
5
Conson Gymnasium - Court 2
11 February 2025, 17:00 UTC+8
Report

Kazakhstan
0

			1	2	3
1	(Japan) (Kazakhstan)	Hiroki Nishi / Akari Sato; Dmitriy Panarin / Aisha Zhumabek	21; 10	21; 9
2	(Japan) (Kazakhstan)	Kaoru Sugiyama; Kamila Smagulova	21; 3	21; 7
3	(Japan) (Kazakhstan)	Kenta Nishimoto; Makhsut Tajibullayev	21; 8	21; 4
4	(Japan) (Kazakhstan)	Rin Iwanaga / Kie Nakanishi; Nargiza Rakhmetullayeva / Aisha Zhumabek	21; 5	21; 6
5	(Japan) (Kazakhstan)	Takumi Nomura / Yuichi Shimogami; Artur Niyazov / Dmitriy Panarin	21; 10	21; 8

==== Thailand vs Kazakhstan ====
Thailand
5
Conson Gymnasium - Court 1
12 February 2025, 17:00 UTC+8
Report

Kazakhstan
0

			1	2	3
1	(Thailand) (Kazakhstan)	Supak Jomkoh / Sapsiree Taerattanachai; Artur Niyazov / Kamila Smagulova	21; 3	21; 8
2	(Thailand) (Kazakhstan)	Pornpawee Chochuwong; Aisha Zhumabek	21; 7	21; 7
3	(Thailand) (Kazakhstan)	Panitchaphon Teeraratsakul; Dmitriy Panarin	21; 13	21; 12
4	(Thailand) (Kazakhstan)	Benyapa Aimsaard / Nuntakarn Aimsaard; Nargiza Rakhmetullayeva / Kamila Smagulova	21; 5	21; 9
5	(Thailand) (Kazakhstan)	Peeratchai Sukphun / Pakkapon Teeraratsakul; Artur Niyazov / Makhsut Tajibullayev	21; 6	21; 4

==== Japan vs Thailand ====
Japan
3
Conson Gymnasium - Court 2
13 February 2025, 17:00 UTC+8
Report

Thailand
2

			1	2	3
1	(Japan) (Thailand)	Hiroki Midorikawa / Natsu Saito; Supak Jomkoh / Sapsiree Taerattanachai	21; 17	13; 21	22; 24
2	(Japan) (Thailand)	Tomoka Miyazaki; Pornpawee Chochuwong	17; 21	13; 21
3	(Japan) (Thailand)	Yushi Tanaka; Panitchaphon Teeraratsakul	21; 13	21; 18
4	(Japan) (Thailand)	Arisa Igarashi / Ayako Sakuramoto; Benyapa Aimsaard / Nuntakarn Aimsaard	21; 14	21; 11
5	(Japan) (Thailand)	Kenya Mitsuhashi / Hiroki Okamura; Peeratchai Sukphun / Pakkapon Teeraratsakul	12; 21	21; 14	21; 17

=== Group D ===
Pos	Team	Pld	W	L	MF	MA	MD	GF	GA	GD	PF	PA	PD	Pts	Qualification
1	South Korea	2	2	0	8	2	+6	18	5	+13	457	329	+128	2	Knockout stage
2	India	2	1	1	7	3	+4	15	8	+7	434	357	+77	1	Knockout stage
3	Macau	2	0	2	0	10	−10	0	20	−20	215	420	−205	0	

Source: BWF

==== South Korea vs Macau ====
South Korea
5
Conson Gymnasium - Court 1
11 February 2025, 09:30 UTC+8
Report

Macau
0

			1	2	3
1	(South Korea) (Macau)	Jin Yong / Jeong Na-eun; Leong Iok Chong / Ng Weng Chi	21; 13	21; 12
2	(South Korea) (Macau)	Kim Joo-eun; Chan Hao Wai	21; 9	21; 6
3	(South Korea) (Macau)	Lee Yun-gyu; Pui Pang Fong	21; 11	21; 9
4	(South Korea) (Macau)	Kim Min-ji / Kim Yu-jung; Ieong Sam Kio / Pui Chi Wa	21; 8	21; 13
5	(South Korea) (Macau)	Ki Dong-ju / Lee Jong-min; Pui Chi Chon / Vong Kok Weng	21; 11	21; 13

==== India vs Macau ====
India
5
Conson Gymnasium - Court 2
12 February 2025, 09:30 UTC+8
Report

Macau
0

			1	2	3
1	(India) (Macau)	Sathish Karunakaran / Aadya Variyath; Leong Iok Chong / Ng Weng Chi	21; 10	21; 9
2	(India) (Macau)	Lakshya Sen; Pui Pang Fong	21; 16	21; 12
3	(India) (Macau)	Malvika Bansod; Chan Hao Wai	21; 15	21; 9
4	(India) (Macau)	Arjun M. R. / Chirag Shetty; Pui Chi Chon / Vong Kok Weng	21; 15	21; 9
5	(India) (Macau)	Treesa Jolly / Gayatri Gopichand; Ng Weng Chi / Pui Chi Wa	21; 10	21; 5

==== South Korea vs India ====
South Korea
3
Conson Gymnasium - Court 2
13 February 2025, 09:30 UTC+8
Report

India
2

			1	2	3
1	(South Korea) (India)	Ki Dong-ju / Jeong Na-eun; Dhruv Kapila / Tanisha Crasto	11; 21	21; 12	21; 15
2	(South Korea) (India)	Sim Yu-jin; Malvika Bansod	21; 9	21; 10
3	(South Korea) (India)	Cho Geon-yeop; Sathish Karunakaran	21; 17	18; 21	19; 21
4	(South Korea) (India)	Kim Min-ji / Kim Yu-jung; Treesa Jolly / Gayatri Gopichand	21; 19	16; 21	11; 21
5	(South Korea) (India)	Jin Yong / Na Sung-seung; Arjun M. R. / Satwiksairaj Rankireddy	21; 14	25; 23

== Knockout stage ==
Quarter-finals
China	3
Hong Kong	2
Japan	3
India	0
Chinese Taipei	0
Indonesia	3
Thailand	3
South Korea	2

Semi-finals
China	3
Japan	2
Indonesia	3
Thailand	1

Final
China	1
Indonesia	3

=== Quarter-finals ===
==== Thailand vs South Korea ====
Thailand
3
Conson Gymnasium - Court 1
14 February 2025, 09:30 UTC+8
Report

South Korea
2

			1	2	3
1	(Thailand) (South Korea)	Supak Jomkoh / Sapsiree Taerattanachai; Lee Jong-min / Jeong Na-eun	15; 21	16; 21
2	(Thailand) (South Korea)	Panitchaphon Teeraratsakul; Lee Yun-gyu	17; 21	21; 12	21; 11
3	(Thailand) (South Korea)	Pornpawee Chochuwong; Sim Yu-jin	21; 18	19; 21	21; 15
4	(Thailand) (South Korea)	Peeratchai Sukphun / Pakkapon Teeraratsakul; Jin Yong / Na Sung-seung	21; 18	8; 21	16; 21
5	(Thailand) (South Korea)	Benyapa Aimsaard / Nuntakarn Aimsaard; Jeong Na-eun / Lee Yeon-woo	18; 21	21; 13	23; 21

==== Japan vs India ====
Japan
3
Conson Gymnasium - Court 2
14 February 2025, 09:30 UTC+8
Report

India
0

			1	2	3
1	(Japan) (India)	Hiroki Midorikawa / Natsu Saito; Dhruv Kapila / Tanisha Crasto	21; 13	17; 21	21; 13
2	(Japan) (India)	Tomoka Miyazaki; Malvika Bansod	21; 12	21; 19
3	(Japan) (India)	Kenta Nishimoto; Prannoy H. S.	21; 14	15; 21	21; 12
4	(Japan) (India)	Arisa Igarashi / Ayako Sakuramoto; Treesa Jolly / Gayatri Gopichand				not played
5	(Japan) (India)	Takumi Nomura / Yuichi Shimogami; Satwiksairaj Rankireddy / Chirag Shetty				not played

==== China vs Hong Kong ====
China
3
Conson Gymnasium - Court 1
14 February 2025, 17:00 UTC+8
Report

Hong Kong
2

			1	2	3
1	(China) (Hong Kong)	Li Hongyi / Bao Lijing; Tang Chun Man / Ng Tsz Yau	10; 21	15; 21
2	(China) (Hong Kong)	Chen Yufei; Saloni Samirbhai Mehta	21; 7	21; 8
3	(China) (Hong Kong)	Hu Zhe'an; Lee Cheuk Yiu	17; 21	21; 7	21; 18
4	(China) (Hong Kong)	Keng Shuliang / Wang Tingge; Yeung Nga Ting / Yeung Pui Lam	21; 16	18; 21	18; 21
5	(China) (Hong Kong)	Chen Xujun / Huang Di; Law Cheuk Him / Yeung Shing Choi	21; 12	21; 15

==== Chinese Taipei vs Indonesia ====
Chinese Taipei
0
Conson Gymnasium - Court 2
14 February 2025, 17:00 UTC+8
Report

Indonesia
3

			1	2	3
1	(Chinese Taipei) (Indonesia)	Yang Po-hsuan / Hu Ling-fang; Dejan Ferdinansyah / Siti Fadia Silva Ramadhanti	21; 16	16; 21	19; 21
2	(Chinese Taipei) (Indonesia)	Lee Chia-hao; Alwi Farhan	16; 21	23; 21	11; 21
3	(Chinese Taipei) (Indonesia)	Sung Shuo-yun; Putri Kusuma Wardani	8; 21	15; 21
4	(Chinese Taipei) (Indonesia)	Liu Kuang-heng / Wang Chi-lin; Muhammad Shohibul Fikri / Daniel Marthin				not played
5	(Chinese Taipei) (Indonesia)	Hung En-tzu / Teng Chun-hsun; Lanny Tria Mayasari / Siti Fadia Silva Ramadhanti				not played

=== Semi-finals ===
==== Indonesia vs Thailand ====
Indonesia
3
Conson Gymnasium - Court 1
15 February 2025, 09:30 UTC+8
Report

Thailand
1

			1	2	3
1	(Indonesia) (Thailand)	Dejan Ferdinansyah / Siti Fadia Silva Ramadhanti; Supak Jomkoh / Sapsiree Taerattanachai	13; 21	20; 22
2	(Indonesia) (Thailand)	Alwi Farhan; Panitchaphon Teeraratsakul	21; 13	21; 18
3	(Indonesia) (Thailand)	Putri Kusuma Wardani; Busanan Ongbamrungphan	21; 10	21; 8
4	(Indonesia) (Thailand)	Muhammad Shohibul Fikri / Daniel Marthin; Peeratchai Sukphun / Pakkapon Teeraratsakul	21; 13	21; 16
5	(Indonesia) (Thailand)	Lanny Tria Mayasari / Siti Fadia Silva Ramadhanti; Benyapa Aimsaard / Nuntakarn Aimsaard				not played

==== China vs Japan ====
China
3
Conson Gymnasium - Court 1
15 February 2025, 17:00 UTC+8
Report

Japan
2

			1	2	3
1	(China) (Japan)	Gao Jiaxuan / Wu Mengying; Hiroki Midorikawa / Natsu Saito	15; 21	16; 21
2	(China) (Japan)	Xu Wenjing; Tomoka Miyazaki	21; 16	21; 17
3	(China) (Japan)	Hu Zhe'an; Yushi Tanaka	7; 21	21; 17	21; 11
4	(China) (Japan)	Chen Qingchen / Wang Tingge; Arisa Igarashi / Ayako Sakuramoto	16; 21	18; 21
5	(China) (Japan)	Chen Xujun / Huang Di; Kenya Mitsuhashi / Hiroki Okamura	20; 22	21; 17	21; 15

=== Final ===
==== China vs Indonesia ====
China
1
Conson Gymnasium - Court 1
16 February 2025, 14:00 UTC+8
Report

Indonesia
3

			1	2	3
1	(China) (Indonesia)	Gao Jiaxuan / Wu Mengying; Rinov Rivaldy / Siti Fadia Silva Ramadhanti	11; 21	13; 21
2	(China) (Indonesia)	Hu Zhe'an; Alwi Farhan	15; 21	13; 21
3	(China) (Indonesia)	Xu Wenjing; Putri Kusuma Wardani	21; 12	21; 13
4	(China) (Indonesia)	Chen Xujun / Huang Di; Muhammad Shohibul Fikri / Daniel Marthin	15; 21	9; 21
5	(China) (Indonesia)	Chen Qingchen / Keng Shuliang; Lanny Tria Mayasari / Siti Fadia Silva Ramadhanti				not played

== Final ranking ==
Pos	Team	Pld	W	L	Pts	MD	GD	PD	Final result
1st place, gold medalist(s)	Indonesia	5	5	0	5	+13	+21	+195	Champions
2nd place, silver medalist(s)	China	5	4	1	4	+2	+4	+84	Runners-up
3rd place, bronze medalist(s)	Japan	4	3	1	3	+8	+16	+187	Eliminated in semi-finals
3rd place, bronze medalist(s)	Thailand	4	2	2	2	+3	+4	+89	Eliminated in semi-finals
5	South Korea	3	2	1	2	+5	+13	+125	Eliminated in quarter-finals
6	India	3	1	2	1	+1	+3	+44	Eliminated in quarter-finals
7	Chinese Taipei	3	1	2	1	–1	–1	–21	Eliminated in quarter-finals
8	Hong Kong	3	1	2	1	–5	–8	–105	Eliminated in quarter-finals
9	Malaysia	2	0	2	0	–2	–3	–32	Eliminated in group stage
10	Singapore	2	0	2	0	−4	−9	−95	Eliminated in group stage
11	Macau	2	0	2	0	−10	−20	−205	Eliminated in group stage
12	Kazakhstan	2	0	2	0	−10	−20	−276	Eliminated in group stage
