= 2019 Badminton Asia Junior Championships – Teams event =

Badminton championship in Suzhou, China

Teams event at the 2019 Badminton Asia Junior Championships
- Venue: Suzhou Olympic Sports Centre
- Location: Suzhou, China
- Dates: 20–23 July 2019

The team tournament at the 2019 Badminton Asia Junior Championships took place from 20 to 23 July 2019 at the Suzhou Olympic Sports Centre in Suzhou, China. A total of 14 countries competed in this event.

== Seedings ==
Seeds for team events were announced on 2 July.

1. Indonesia (final)
2. China (semi-finals)
3. Thailand (champion)
4. South Korea (semi-finals)
5. India (quarter-finals)
6. Japan (quarter-finals)
7. Chinese Taipei (group stage)
8. Singapore (quarter-finals)

== Group stage ==
=== Group A ===
Pos	Team	Pld	W	L	MF	MA	MD	GF	GA	GD	PF	PA	PD	Pts	Qualification	Indonesia	Japan	Malaysia
1	Indonesia	2	2	0	9	1	+8	19	4	+15	461	338	+123	2	Advance to knockout stage	—	4–1	5–0
2	Japan	2	1	1	4	6	−2	10	14	−4	427	449	−22	1	Advance to knockout stage		—	3–2
3	Malaysia	2	0	2	2	8	−6	6	17	−11	350	451	−101	0				—

Source: TS

==== Malaysia vs Indonesia ====
Malaysia
0
Suzhou Olympic Sports Centre, Court 1
20 July 2019, 09:00 UTC+7

Indonesia
5

			1	2	3
1	(Malaysia) (Indonesia)	Ching Kai Feng / Loo Bing Kun; Leo Rolly Carnando / Daniel Marthin	16; 21	15; 21
2	(Malaysia) (Indonesia)	Tan Zhing Yi; Putri Kusuma Wardani	8; 21	13; 21
3	(Malaysia) (Indonesia)	Lee Shun Yang; Bobby Setiabudi	8; 21	21; 11	19; 21
4	(Malaysia) (Indonesia)	Low Yeen Yuan / Valeree Siow; Nita Violina Marwah / Putri Syaikah	9; 21	9; 21
5	(Malaysia) (Indonesia)	Yap Roy King / Gan Jing Err; Leo Rolly Carnando / Indah Cahya Sari Jamil	18; 21	5; 21

==== Japan vs Malaysia ====
Japan
4
Suzhou Olympic Sports Centre, Court 2
20 July 2019, 16:00 UTC+7

Malaysia
1

			1	2	3
1	(Japan) (Malaysia)	Yoshifumi Fujisawa / Kakeru Kumagai; Lwi Sheng Hao / Ooi Jhy Dar	21; 18	16; 21	21; 19
2	(Japan) (Malaysia)	Riko Gunji; Letshanaa Karupathevan	21; 9	21; 13
3	(Japan) (Malaysia)	Riku Hatano; Kok Jing Hong	18; 21	16; 21
4	(Japan) (Malaysia)	Rui Hirokami / Mizuki Otake; Go Pei Kee / Teoh Le Xuan	21; 17	21; 11
5	(Japan) (Malaysia)	Tsubasa Kawamura / Hinata Suzuki; Yap Roy King / Gan Jing Err	21; 17	19; 21	14; 21

==== Indonesia vs Japan ====
Indonesia
5
Suzhou Olympic Sports Centre, Court 3
21 July 2019, 09:00 UTC+7

Japan
0

			1	2	3
1	(Indonesia) (Japan)	Leo Rolly Carnando / Daniel Marthin; Yoshifumi Fujisawa / Kakeru Kumagai	21; 11	21; 15
2	(Indonesia) (Japan)	Putri Kusuma Wardani; Riko Gunji	21; 10	21; 17
3	(Indonesia) (Japan)	Christian Adinata; Riku Hatano	21; 13	18; 21	21; 19
4	(Indonesia) (Japan)	Nita Violina Marwah / Putri Syaikah; Rui Hirokami / Mizuki Otake	17; 21	21; 18	16; 21
5	(Indonesia) (Japan)	Leo Rolly Carnando / Indah Cahya Sari Jamil; Tsubasa Kawamura / Hinata Suzuki	21; 17	21; 14

=== Group B ===
Pos	Team	Pld	W	L	MF	MA	MD	GF	GA	GD	PF	PA	PD	Pts	Qualification	Thailand	Hong Kong	Chinese Taipei for Olympic games	Sri Lanka
1	Thailand	3	3	0	14	1	+13	29	7	+22	734	503	+231	3	Advance to knockout stage	—	5–0	4–1	5–0
2	Hong Kong	3	2	1	8	7	+1	19	16	+3	625	595	+30	2	Advance to knockout stage		—	3–2	5–0
3	Chinese Taipei	3	1	2	7	8	−1	19	18	+1	678	643	+35	1				—	4–1
4	Sri Lanka	3	0	3	1	14	−13	3	29	−26	368	664	−296	0					—

Source: TS

==== Thailand vs Sri Lanka ====
Thailand
5
Suzhou Olympic Sports Centre, Court 2
20 July 2019, 09:00 UTC+7

Sri Lanka
0

			1	2	3
1	(Thailand) (Sri Lanka)	Tanadon Punpanich / Sirawit Sothon; Chamath Dias / Chirath Illeperumachchi	21; 8	21; 11
2	(Thailand) (Sri Lanka)	Benyapa Aimsaard; Dilmi Dias	21; 7	21; 12
3	(Thailand) (Sri Lanka)	Setthanan Piyawatcharavijit; Lochana de Silva	21; 8	21; 14
4	(Thailand) (Sri Lanka)	Pornpicha Choeikeewong / Pornnicha Suwatnodom; Jananuwani Amanda / Yeheni Kuruppu	21; 11	21; 9
5	(Thailand) (Sri Lanka)	Apichasit Teerawiwiwat / Phittayaporn Chaiwan; Dumindu Abeywickrama / Panchali Adhikari	21; 9	21; 3

==== Chinese Taipei vs Hong Kong ====
Chinese Taipei
1
Suzhou Olympic Sports Centre, Court 3
20 July 2019, 09:00 UTC+7

Hong Kong
4

			1	2	3
1	(Chinese Taipei) (Hong Kong)	Yu Sheng-po / Hung En-tzu; Ko Shing Hei / Yeung Pui Lam	17; 21	14; 21
2	(Chinese Taipei) (Hong Kong)	Su Li-yang; Jason Gunawan	21; 16	17; 21	21; 13
3	(Chinese Taipei) (Hong Kong)	Wei Chun-wei / Wu Guan-xun; Ko Shing Hei / Lui Chun Wai	21; 16	17; 21	16; 21
4	(Chinese Taipei) (Hong Kong)	Tung Ciou-tong; Lo Sin Yan	21; 16	21; 18
5	(Chinese Taipei) (Hong Kong)	Jiang Pin-yue / Ting Ya-yun; Tsang Hiu Yan / Yeung Pui Lam	11; 21	15; 21

==== Thailand vs Hong Kong ====
Thailand
5
Suzhou Olympic Sports Centre, Court 1
20 July 2019, 16:00 UTC+7

Hong Kong
0

			1	2	3
1	(Thailand) (Hong Kong)	Thanawin Madee / Ratchapol Makkasasithorn; Ko Shing Hei / Lui Chun Wai	20; 22	21; 10	22; 20
2	(Thailand) (Hong Kong)	Phittayaporn Chaiwan; Saloni Samirbhai Mehta	21; 9	21; 11
3	(Thailand) (Hong Kong)	Kunlavut Vitidsarn; Jason Gunawan	21; 13	21; 11
4	(Thailand) (Hong Kong)	Benyapa Aimsaard / Peeraya Khantaruangsakul; Lui Lok Lok / Tsang Hiu Yan	21; 9	21; 14
5	(Thailand) (Hong Kong)	Kunlavut Vitidsarn / Phittayaporn Chaiwan; Lui Chun Wai / Yeung Pui Lam	19; 21	21; 16	21; 13

==== Chinese Taipei vs Sri Lanka ====
Chinese Taipei
4
Suzhou Olympic Sports Centre, Court 6
20 July 2019, 16:00 UTC+7

Sri Lanka
1

			1	2	3
1	(Chinese Taipei) (Sri Lanka)	Chen Zhi-ray / Cheng Kai-wen; Chamath Dias / Chirath Illeperumachchi	21; 11	21; 12
2	(Chinese Taipei) (Sri Lanka)	Yeo Ying Chee; Dilmi Dias	21; 19	20; 22	15; 21
3	(Chinese Taipei) (Sri Lanka)	Liao Jhuo-fu; Lochana de Silva	21; 9	21; 12
4	(Chinese Taipei) (Sri Lanka)	Chiang Yi-hsuan / Sun Yu-hsing; Jananuwani Amanda / Yeheni Kuruppu	21; 13	21; 9
5	(Chinese Taipei) (Sri Lanka)	Chiang Chien-Wei / Hung En-Tzu; Lochana de Silva / Dilmi Dias	21; 6	21; 9

==== Thailand vs Chinese Taipei ====
Thailand
4
Suzhou Olympic Sports Centre, Court 4
21 July 2019, 09:00 UTC+7

Chinese Taipei
1

			1	2	3
1	(Thailand) (Chinese Taipei)	Sirawit Sothon / Pornnicha Suwatnodom; Chiang Chien-wei / Hung En-tzu	21; 19	13; 21	21; 18
2	(Thailand) (Chinese Taipei)	Kunlavut Vitidsarn; Yu Sheng-po	21; 23	21; 11	21; 19
3	(Thailand) (Chinese Taipei)	Thanawin Madee / Ratchapol Makkasasithorn; Wei Chun-wei / Wu Guan-xun	21; 17	19; 21	20; 22
4	(Thailand) (Chinese Taipei)	Phittayaporn Chaiwan; Tung Ciou-tong	21; 10	21; 11
5	(Thailand) (Chinese Taipei)	Benyapa Aimsaard / Peeraya Khantaruangsakul; Hung En-tzu / Sun Yu-hsing	21; 16	12; 21	21; 13

==== Hong Kong vs Sri Lanka ====
Hong Kong
5
Suzhou Olympic Sports Centre, Court 5
21 July 2019, 09:00 UTC+7

Sri Lanka
0

			1	2	3
1	(Hong Kong) (Sri Lanka)	Lui Chun Wai / Leung Sze Lok; Dumindu Abeywickrama / Jananuwani Amanda	21; 4	21; 9
2	(Hong Kong) (Sri Lanka)	Ko Shing Hei; Lochana de Silva	21; 6	21; 10
3	(Hong Kong) (Sri Lanka)	Jason Gunawan / Hung Kuei Chun; Chamath Dias / Chirath Illeperumachchi	21; 11	19; 21	21; 15
4	(Hong Kong) (Sri Lanka)	Ng Tin Yan; Dilmi Dias	22; 20	21; 18
5	(Hong Kong) (Sri Lanka)	Leung Sze Lok / Yeung Pui Lam; Panchali Adhikari / Yeheni Kuruppu	21; 8	21; 11

=== Group C ===
Pos	Team	Pld	W	L	MF	MA	MD	GF	GA	GD	PF	PA	PD	Pts	Qualification	South Korea	India	Macau	Mongolia
1	South Korea	3	3	0	14	1	+13	29	4	+25	681	314	+367	3	Advance to knockout stage	—	4–1	5–0	5–0
2	India	3	2	1	11	4	+7	24	9	+15	625	419	+206	2	Advance to knockout stage		—	5–0	5–0
3	Macau	3	1	2	4	11	−7	9	22	−13	410	543	−133	1				—	4–1
4	Mongolia	3	0	3	1	14	−13	2	29	−27	201	641	−440	0					—

Source: TS

==== South Korea vs Macau ====
South Korea
5
Suzhou Olympic Sports Centre, Court 5
20 July 2019, 09:00 UTC+7

Macau
0

			1	2	3
1	(South Korea) (Macau)	Noh Min-woo / Kim Ah-young; Vong Kok Weng / Pui Chi Wa	21; 7	21; 12
2	(South Korea) (Macau)	Park Sang-yong; Ao Fei Long	21; 12	21; 4
3	(South Korea) (Macau)	Kim Ga-ram; Wong Cheng Wa	21; 3	21; 3
4	(South Korea) (Macau)	Ki Dong-ju / Kim Joon-young; Leong Iok Chong / Ng Ka Seng	21; 16	21; 13
5	(South Korea) (Macau)	Ji Young-bin / Lee Eun-ji; Pui Chi Wa / Wong Cheng Wa	21; 7	21; 8

==== India vs Mongolia ====
India
5
Suzhou Olympic Sports Centre, Court 6
20 July 2019, 09:00 UTC+7

Mongolia
0

			1	2	3
1	(India) (Mongolia)	Dingku Singh Konthoujam / Ritika Thaker; Sanchirjav Lkhaasuren / Munkhnar Lkhagvasuren	21; 8	21; 4
2	(India) (Mongolia)	Sathish Kumar Karunakaran; Sumiyasuren Enkhbat	21; 10	21; 6
3	(India) (Mongolia)	Malvika Bansod; Kherlen Darkhanbaatar	21; 2	21; 6
4	(India) (Mongolia)	Ishaan Bhatnagar / Vishnuvardhan Goud Panjala; Sumiyasuren Enkhbat / Sanchirjav Lkhaasuren	21; 9	21; 6
5	(India) (Mongolia)	Tanisha Crasto / Treesa Jolly; Kherlen Darkhanbaatar / Munkhnar Lkhagvasuren	21; 1	21; 2

==== South Korea vs Mongolia ====
South Korea
5
Suzhou Olympic Sports Centre, Court 3
20 July 2019, 16:00 UTC+7

Mongolia
0

			1	2	3
1	(South Korea) (Mongolia)	Kim So-jung / Lee Min-seo; Sumiyasuren Enkhbat / Kherlen Darkhanbaatar	21; 4	21; 3
2	(South Korea) (Mongolia)	Park Hyeon-seung; Sanchirjav Lkhaasuren	21; 3	21; 2
3	(South Korea) (Mongolia)	Chung Da-jeong; Munkhnar Lkhagvasuren	21; 2	21; 3
4	(South Korea) (Mongolia)	Jin Yong / Lee Hak-joo; Sumiyasuren Enkhbat / Sanchirjav Lkhaasuren	21; 2	21; 3
5	(South Korea) (Mongolia)	Choi Hye-jin / Lee So-yul; Kherlen Darkhanbaatar / Munkhnar Lkhagvasuren	21; 1	21; 1

==== India vs Macau ====
India
5
Suzhou Olympic Sports Centre, Court 4
20 July 2019, 16:00 UTC+7

Macau
0

			1	2	3
1	(India) (Macau)	Dingku Singh Konthoujam / Ritika Thaker; Leong Iok Chong / Wong Cheng Wa	21; 17	21; 15
2	(India) (Macau)	Meiraba Luwang Maisnam; Lee Rui Huan	21; 5	21; 7
3	(India) (Macau)	Malvika Bansod; Pui Chi Wa	21; 17	21; 7
4	(India) (Macau)	Ishaan Bhatnagar / Vishnuvardhan Goud Panjala; Ng Ka Seng / Pui Chi Chon	21; 9	21; 9
5	(India) (Macau)	Tanisha Crasto / Treesa Jolly; Pui Chi Wa / Wong Cheng Wa	21; 6	21; 12

==== South Korea vs India ====
South Korea
4
Suzhou Olympic Sports Centre, Court 2
21 July 2019, 09:00 UTC+7

India
1

			1	2	3
1	(South Korea) (India)	Ki Dong-ju / Lee Eun-ji; Dingku Singh Konthoujam / Ritika Thaker	19; 21	21; 12	21; 12
2	(South Korea) (India)	Park Hyeon-seung; Meiraba Luwang Maisnam	19; 21	21; 19	18; 21
3	(South Korea) (India)	Ki Dong-ju / Kim Joon-young; Ishaan Bhatnagar / Vishnuvardhan Goud Panjala	21; 17	21; 15
4	(South Korea) (India)	Kim Ga-ram; Malvika Bansod	21; 10	21; 8
5	(South Korea) (India)	Ji Young-bin / Lee Eun-ji; Tanisha Crasto / Treesa Jolly	21; 16	16; 21	21; 12

==== Mongolia vs Macau ====
Mongolia
1
Suzhou Olympic Sports Centre, Court 6
21 July 2019 09:00 UTC+7

Macau
4

			1	2	3
1	(Mongolia) (Macau)	Sanchirjav Lkhaasuren / Munkhnar Lkhagvasuren; Leong Iok Chong / Wong Cheng Wa	4; 21	11; 21
2	(Mongolia) (Macau)	Sumiyasuren Enkhbat; Vong Kok Weng	21; 17	13; 21	21; 15
3	(Mongolia) (Macau)	Kherlen Darkhanbaatar; Pui Chi Wa	4; 21	5; 21
4	(Mongolia) (Macau)	Sumiyasuren Enkhbat / Sanchirjav Lkhasuuren; Leong Iok Chong / Ng Ka Seng	14; 21	11; 21
5	(Mongolia) (Macau)	Kherlen Darkhanbaatar / Munkhnar Lkhagvasuren; Pui Chi Wa / Wong Cheng Wa	9; 21	10; 21

=== Group D ===
Pos	Team	Pld	W	L	MF	MA	MD	GF	GA	GD	PF	PA	PD	Pts	Qualification	People's Republic of China	Singapore	Nepal
1	China	2	2	0	10	0	+10	20	0	+20	420	149	+271	2	Advance to knockout stage	—	5–0	5–0
2	Singapore	2	1	1	5	5	0	10	10	0	313	310	+3	1	Advance to knockout stage		—	5–0
3	Nepal	2	0	2	0	10	−10	0	20	−20	146	420	−274	0				—

Source: TS

==== China vs Nepal ====
China
5
Suzhou Olympic Sports Centre, Court 4
20 July 2019, 09:00 UTC+7

Nepal
0

			1	2	3
1	(China) (Nepal)	Di Zijian / Li Yijing; Praful Maharjan / Sima Rajbanshi	21; 4	21; 3
2	(China) (Nepal)	Li Yunze; Prince Dahal	21; 8	21; 6
3	(China) (Nepal)	Dai Wang; Jessica Gurung	21; 3	21; 1
4	(China) (Nepal)	Dai Enyi / Feng Yanzhe; Prince Dahal / Praful Maharjan	21; 9	21; 5
5	(China) (Nepal)	Lin Fangling / Zhou Xinru; Jessica Gurung / Sima Rajbanshi	21; 4	21; 3

==== Singapore vs Nepal ====
Singapore
5
Suzhou Olympic Sports Centre, Court 5
20 July 2019, 16:00 UTC+7

Nepal
0

			1	2	3
1	(Singapore) (Nepal)	Darrion Michael Ng / Ong Xi Qing; Praful Maharjan / Sima Rajbanshi	21; 8	21; 6
2	(Singapore) (Nepal)	Nigel Yap; Prince Dahal	21; 11	21; 16
3	(Singapore) (Nepal)	Insyirah Khan; Jessica Gurung	21; 7	21; 9
4	(Singapore) (Nepal)	Howin Wong / Aaron Yong; Prince Dahal / Praful Maharjan	21; 9	21; 13
5	(Singapore) (Nepal)	Joey Koh / Megan Lee; Jessica Gurung / Sima Rajbanshi	21; 11	21; 10

==== China vs Singapore ====
China
5
Suzhou Olympic Sports Centre, Court 1
21 July 2019, 09:00 UTC+7

Singapore
0

			1	2	3
1	(China) (Singapore)	Di Zijian / Wang Chang; Howin Wong / Aaron Yong	21; 12	21; 15
2	(China) (Singapore)	Zhou Meng; Insyirah Khan	21; 7	21; 15
3	(China) (Singapore)	Liu Liang; Nigel Yap	21; 16	21; 10
4	(China) (Singapore)	Li Yijing / Luo Xumin; Joey Koh / Megan Lee	21; 7	21; 11
5	(China) (Singapore)	Feng Yanzhe / Lin Fangling; Aaron Yong / Insyirah Khan	21; 4	21; 6

== Knockout stage ==
Quarter-finals
22 July
Indonesia	3
India	0
22 July
South Korea	3
Singapore	0
22 July
Japan	2
Thailand	3
22 July
Hong Kong	0
China	3

Semi-finals
22 July
Indonesia	3
South Korea	1
22 July
Thailand	3
China	1

Final
23 July
Indonesia	2
Thailand	3

=== Quarter-finals ===
==== Indonesia vs India ====
Indonesia
3
Suzhou Olympic Sports Centre, Court 4
22 July 2019, 09:00 UTC+7

India
0

			1	2	3
1	(Indonesia) (India)	Leo Rolly Carnando / Indah Cahya Sari Jamil; Sathish Kumar Karunakaran / Tanisha Crasto	21; 15	21; 18
2	(Indonesia) (India)	Bobby Setiabudi; Meiraba Luwang Maisnam	21; 17	15; 21	21; 11
3	(Indonesia) (India)	Putri Kusuma Wardani; Malvika Bansod	22; 20	21; 7
4	(Indonesia) (India)	Leo Rolly Carnando / Daniel Marthin; Dingku Singh Konthoujam / Vishnuvardhan Goud Panjala				not played
5	(Indonesia) (India)	Nita Violina Marwah / Putri Syaikah; Tanisha Crasto / Treesa Jolly				not played

==== South Korea vs Singapore ====
South Korea
3
Suzhou Olympic Sports Centre, Court 2
22 July 2019, 09:00 UTC+7

Singapore
0

			1	2	3
1	(South Korea) (Singapore)	Ki Dong-ju / Kim Eun-ji; Darrion Michael Ng / Ong Xi Qing	21; 17	21; 9
2	(South Korea) (Singapore)	Park Sang-yong; Nigel Yap	21; 14	21; 15
3	(South Korea) (Singapore)	Lee So-yul; Insyirah Khan	21; 18	21; 23	21; 19
4	(South Korea) (Singapore)	Ki Dong-ju / Kim Joon-young; Howin Wong / Aaron Yong				not played
5	(South Korea) (Singapore)	Ji Young-bin / Kim Eun-ji; Joey Koh / Megan Lee				not played

==== Japan vs Thailand ====
Japan
2
Suzhou Olympic Sports Centre, Court 3
22 July 2019, 09:00 UTC+7

Thailand
3

			1	2	3
1	(Japan) (Thailand)	Riku Hatano; Kunlavut Vitidsarn	4; 21	14; 21
2	(Japan) (Thailand)	Riko Gunji; Phittayaporn Chaiwan	13; 21	15; 21
3	(Japan) (Thailand)	Yoshifumi Fujisawa / Kakeru Kumagai; Thanawin Madee / Ratchapol Makkasasithorn	21; 15	21; 17
4	(Japan) (Thailand)	Rui Hirokami / Mizuki Otake; Benyapa Aimsaard / Peeraya Khantaruangsakul	19; 21	21; 15	23; 21
5	(Japan) (Thailand)	Tsubasa Kawamura / Hinata Suzuki; Kunlavut Vitidsarn / Phittayaporn Chaiwan	13; 21	12; 21

==== Hong Kong vs China ====
Hong Kong
0
Suzhou Olympic Sports Centre, Court 1
22 July 2019, 09:00 UTC+7

China
3

			1	2	3
1	(Hong Kong) (China)	Ko Shing Hei / Yeung Pui Lam; Feng Yanzhe / Lin Fangling	8; 21	17; 21
2	(Hong Kong) (China)	Jason Gunawan; Liu Liang	13; 21	19; 21
3	(Hong Kong) (China)	Lo Sin Yan; Dai Wang	19; 21	17; 21
4	(Hong Kong) (China)	Ko Shing Hei / Lui Chun Wai; Di Zijian / Wang Chang				not played
5	(Hong Kong) (China)	Tsang Hiu Yan / Yeung Pui Lam; Li Yijing / Luo Xumin				not played

=== Semi-finals ===
==== Thailand vs China ====
Thailand
3
Suzhou Olympic Sports Centre, Court 1
22 July 2019, 16:00 UTC+7

China
1

			1	2	3
1	(Thailand) (China)	Kunlavut Vitidsarn; Li Yunze	21; 15	21; 16
2	(Thailand) (China)	Phittayaporn Chaiwan; Zhou Meng	17; 21	21; 16	21; 17
3	(Thailand) (China)	Tanadon Punpanich / Sirawit Sothon; Di Zijian / Wang Chang	10; 21	14; 21
4	(Thailand) (China)	Benyapa Aimsaard / Peeraya Khantaruangsakul; Luo Xumin / Zhou Xinru	21; 19	21; 11
5	(Thailand) (China)	Kunlavut Vitidsarn / Phittayaporn Chaiwan; Feng Yanzhe / Lin Fangling				not played

==== Indonesia vs South Korea ====
Indonesia
3
Suzhou Olympic Sports Centre, Court 2
22 July 2019, 16:00 UTC+7

South Korea
1

			1	2	3
1	(Indonesia) (South Korea)	Leo Rolly Carnando / Indah Cahya Sari Jamil; Ki Dong-ju / Lee Yeon-woo	23; 21	21; 15
2	(Indonesia) (South Korea)	Christian Adinata; Park Hyeon-seung	18; 21	21; 17	20; 22
3	(Indonesia) (South Korea)	Putri Kusuma Wardani; Kim Ga-ram	21; 14	21; 14
4	(Indonesia) (South Korea)	Nita Violina Marwah / Putri Syaikah; Ji Young-bin / Lee Eun-ji	21; 18	21; 16
5	(Indonesia) (South Korea)	Leo Rolly Carnando / Daniel Marthin; Ki Dong-ju / Kim Joon-young				not played

=== Final ===
==== Indonesia vs Thailand ====
Indonesia
2
Suzhou Olympic Sports Centre, Court 1
23 July 2019, 10:00 UTC+7

Thailand
3

			1	2	3
1	(Indonesia) (Thailand)	Leo Rolly Carnando / Daniel Marthin; Thanawin Madee / Ratchapol Makkasasithorn	21; 11	21; 14
2	(Indonesia) (Thailand)	Putri Kusuma Wardani; Phittayaporn Chaiwan	18; 21	21; 12	21; 11
3	(Indonesia) (Thailand)	Bobby Setiabudi; Kunlavut Vitidsarn	16; 21	21; 15	18; 21
4	(Indonesia) (Thailand)	Nita Violina Marwah / Putri Syaikah; Benyapa Aimsaard / Peeraya Khantaruangsakul	16; 21	21; 16	8; 21
5	(Indonesia) (Thailand)	Leo Rolly Carnando / Indah Cahya Sari Jamil; Kunlavut Vitidsarn / Phittayaporn Chaiwan	12; 21	16; 21
