= 2018 Badminton Asia Junior Championships – Teams event =

Badminton championship in Jakarta, Indonesia

Teams event at the 2018 Badminton Asia Junior Championships
- Venue: Jaya Raya Sports Hall Training Center
- Location: Jakarta, Indonesia
- Dates: 14–17 July 2018

The team tournament at the 2018 Badminton Asia Junior Championships took place from 14 to 17 July 2018 at the Jaya Raya Sports Hall Training Center in Jakarta, Indonesia. A total of 14 countries competed in this event.

== Group stage ==
=== Group A ===
Pos	Team	Pld	W	L	MF	MA	MD	GF	GA	GD	PF	PA	PD	Pts	Qualification	People's Republic of China	Malaysia	Myanmar
1	China	2	2	0	9	1	+8	19	3	+16	458	230	+228	2	Advance to knockout stage	—	4–1	5–0
2	Malaysia	2	1	1	6	4	+2	13	9	+4	407	308	+99	1	Advance to knockout stage		—	5–0
3	Myanmar	2	0	2	0	10	−10	0	20	−20	93	420	−327	0				—

Source: BadmintonCN

==== China vs Myanmar ====
China
5
Jaya Raya Sports Hall Training Center, Court 1
14 July 2018, 09:00 UTC+7

Myanmar
0

			1	2	3
1	(China) (Myanmar)	Bai Yupeng; Min Htet Kaung	21; 3	21; 6
2	(China) (Myanmar)	Zhou Meng; Khaing Thin Zar	21; 2	21; 2
3	(China) (Myanmar)	Liang Weikeng / Shang Yichen; Aung Kaung / Zwe Yan Naing	21; 5	21; 2
4	(China) (Myanmar)	Xia Yuting / Zhang Shuxian; Wai Wai / Khaing Thin Zar	21; 2	21; 3
5	(China) (Myanmar)	Guo Ruohan / Li Yijing; Min Htet Kaung / Seng Jar Nan	21; 5	21; 3

==== Malaysia vs Myanmar ====
Malaysia
5
Jaya Raya Sports Hall Training Center, Court 2
14 July 2018, 16:00 UTC+7

Myanmar
0

			1	2	3
1	(Malaysia) (Myanmar)	Chang Yee Jun / Choong Hon Jian; Aung Kaung / Zwe Yan Naing	21; 7	21; 3
2	(Malaysia) (Myanmar)	Eoon Qi Xuan; Khaing Thin Zar	21; 7	21; 6
3	(Malaysia) (Myanmar)	Ng Tze Yong; Min Htet Kaung	21; 8	21; 8
4	(Malaysia) (Myanmar)	Pearly Tan / Toh Ee Wei; Wai Wai / Khaing Thin Zar	21; 4	21; 6
5	(Malaysia) (Myanmar)	Chua Yue Chern / Eng Sin Jou; Min Htet Kaung / Seng Jar Nan	21; 4	21; 7

==== China vs Malaysia ====
China
4
Jaya Raya Sports Hall Training Center, Court 2
15 July 2018, 09:00 UTC+7

Malaysia
1

			1	2	3
1	(China) (Malaysia)	Di Zijian / Wang Chang; Chang Yee Jun / Chua Yue Chern	21; 13	21; 23	18; 21
2	(China) (Malaysia)	Wang Zhiyi; Eoon Qi Xuan	21; 14	21; 17
3	(China) (Malaysia)	Li Shifeng; Lim Chong King	21; 18	21; 14
4	(China) (Malaysia)	Xia Yuting / Zhang Shuxian; Eng Sin Jou / Yap Ling	21; 14	21; 6
5	(China) (Malaysia)	Guo Xinwa / Liu Xuanxuan; Chia Wei Jie / Toh Ee Wei	20; 22	21; 18	21; 17

=== Group B ===
Pos	Team	Pld	W	L	MF	MA	MD	GF	GA	GD	PF	PA	PD	Pts	Qualification	Thailand	Chinese Taipei for Olympic games	Hong Kong	Macau
1	Thailand	3	3	0	15	0	+15	30	2	+28	670	417	+253	3	Advance to knockout stage	—	5–0	5–0	5–0
2	Chinese Taipei	3	2	1	8	7	+1	18	14	+4	589	517	+72	2	Advance to knockout stage		—	3–2	5–0
3	Hong Kong	3	1	2	7	8	−1	15	18	−3	581	555	+26	1				—	5–0
4	Macau	3	0	3	0	15	−15	1	30	−29	292	643	−351	0					—

Source: BadmintonCN

==== Thailand vs Macau ====
Thailand
5
Jaya Raya Sports Hall Training Center, Court 2
14 July 2018, 09:00 UTC+7

Macau
0

			1	2	3
1	(Thailand) (Macau)	Thanawin Madee / Wachirawit Sothon; Che Pui Ngai / Leong Iok Chong	21; 18	21; 13
2	(Thailand) (Macau)	Phittayaporn Chaiwan; Wong Cheng Wa	21; 4	21; 5
3	(Thailand) (Macau)	Phanuwat Srimanta; Pui Pang Fong	21; 7	21; 11
4	(Thailand) (Macau)	Benyapa Aimsaard / Peeraya Khantaruangsakul; Chio Weng U / Wong Cheng Wa	21; 5	21; 6
5	(Thailand) (Macau)	Weeraphat Phakjarung / Chasinee Korepap; Lee Rui Huan / Cheong I Teng	21; 10	21; 5

==== Chinese Taipei vs Hong Kong ====
Chinese Taipei
3
Jaya Raya Sports Hall Training Center, Court 3
14 July 2018, 09:00 UTC+7

Hong Kong
2

			1	2	3
1	(Chinese Taipei) (Hong Kong)	Hsieh Yu-ying; Leung Yuet Yee	21; 13	21; 11
2	(Chinese Taipei) (Hong Kong)	Chen Shiau-cheng; Ko Shing Hei	16; 21	14; 21
3	(Chinese Taipei) (Hong Kong)	Li Zi-qing / Teng Chun-hsun; Leung Sze Lok / Yeung Pui Lam	21; 14	21; 17
4	(Chinese Taipei) (Hong Kong)	Chang Hao-chao / Lin Yu-chieh; Chow Hin Long / Lui Chun Wai	18; 21	21; 13	20; 22
5	(Chinese Taipei) (Hong Kong)	Teng Chun-hsun / Yu Sheng-po; Ko Shing Hei / Yeung Pui Lam	21; 17	21; 19

==== Thailand vs Hong Kong ====
Thailand
5
Jaya Raya Sports Hall Training Center, Court 3
14 July 2018, 16:00 UTC+7

Hong Kong
0

			1	2	3
1	(Thailand) (Hong Kong)	Ratchapol Makkasasithorn / Weeraphat Phakjarung; Chow Hin Long / Lui Chun Wai	21; 17	20; 22	21; 18
2	(Thailand) (Hong Kong)	Phittayaporn Chaiwan; Leung Yuet Yee	21; 12	21; 15
3	(Thailand) (Hong Kong)	Kunlavut Vitidsarn; Ko Shing Hei	21; 12	21; 14
4	(Thailand) (Hong Kong)	Benyapa Aimsaard / Chasinee Korepap; Lui Lok Lok / Tsang Hiu Yan	21; 18	21; 9
5	(Thailand) (Hong Kong)	Kunlavut Vitidsarn / Phittayaporn Chaiwan; Chow Hin Long / Leung Sze Lok	21; 19	21; 13

==== Chinese Taipei vs Macau ====
Chinese Taipei
5
Jaya Raya Sports Hall Training Center, Court 4
14 July 2018, 16:00 UTC+7

Macau
0

			1	2	3
1	(Chinese Taipei) (Macau)	Lin Yu-chieh / Li Zi-qing; Leong Iok Chong / Wong Cheng Wa	21; 13	21; 10
2	(Chinese Taipei) (Macau)	Yang Yang; Ao Fei Long	21; 9	21; 14
3	(Chinese Taipei) (Macau)	Wei Chun-wei / Wu Guan-xun; Che Pui Ngai / Lee Rui Huan	21; 12	21; 7
4	(Chinese Taipei) (Macau)	Tung Ciou-tong; Chio Weng U	21; 4	21; 11
5	(Chinese Taipei) (Macau)	Cheng Yu-pei / Hung En-tzu; Cheong I Teng / Wong Cheng Wa	21; 8	21; 10

==== Hong Kong vs Macau ====
Hong Kong
5
Jaya Raya Sports Hall Training Center, Court 5
15 July 2018, 09:00 UTC+7

Macau
0

			1	2	3
1	(Hong Kong) (Macau)	Lui Chun Wai / Yeung Pui Lam; Lee Rui Huan / Cheong I Teng	21; 5	21; 3
2	(Hong Kong) (Macau)	Mak Pak Ngai; Pui Pang Fong	13; 21	21; 12	21; 14
3	(Hong Kong) (Macau)	Saloni Samirbhai Mehta; Chio Weng U	21; 5	21; 11
4	(Hong Kong) (Macau)	Chow Hin Long / Lui Chun Wai; Che Pui Ngai / Leong Iok Chong	21; 16	21; 9
5	(Hong Kong) (Macau)	Leung Yuet Yee / Tsang Hiu Yan; Cheong I Teng / Chio Weng U	21; 9	21; 5

==== Thailand vs Chinese Taipei ====
Thailand
5
Jaya Raya Sports Hall Training Center, Court 4
15 July 2018, 16:00 UTC+7

Chinese Taipei
0

			1	2	3
1	(Thailand) (Chinese Taipei)	Phittayaporn Chaiwan; Lin Sih-yun	19; 21	21; 12	21; 8
2	(Thailand) (Chinese Taipei)	Kunlavut Vitidsarn; Chen Shiau-cheng	21; 17	21; 13
3	(Thailand) (Chinese Taipei)	Benyapa Aimsaard / Chasinee Korepap; Li Zi-qing / Teng Chun-hsun	22; 20	21; 18
4	(Thailand) (Chinese Taipei)	Thanawin Madee / Wachirawit Sothon; Chang Hao-chao / Lin Yu-chieh	21; 13	21; 18
5	(Thailand) (Chinese Taipei)	Kunlavut Vitidsarn / Phittayaporn Chaiwan; Teng Chun-hsun / Yu Sheng-po	21; 12	21; 12

=== Group C ===
Pos	Team	Pld	W	L	MF	MA	MD	GF	GA	GD	PF	PA	PD	Pts	Qualification	South Korea	India	Sri Lanka	Kazakhstan
1	South Korea	3	3	0	14	1	+13	28	4	+24	657	382	+275	3	Advance to knockout stage	—	4–1	5–0	5–0
2	India	3	2	1	11	4	+7	24	8	+16	614	444	+170	2	Advance to knockout stage		—	5–0	5–0
3	Sri Lanka	3	1	2	3	12	−9	6	24	−18	425	574	−149	1				—	3–2
4	Kazakhstan	3	0	3	2	13	−11	4	26	−22	318	614	−296	0					—

Source: BadmintonCN

==== South Korea vs Sri Lanka ====
South Korea
5
Jaya Raya Sports Hall Training Center, Court 4
14 July 2018, 09:00 UTC+7

Sri Lanka
0

			1	2	3
1	(South Korea) (Sri Lanka)	Choi Ji-hoon; Vikum Fernando	21; 10	21; 9
2	(South Korea) (Sri Lanka)	Kim Seong-min; Dilmi Dias	21; 9	21; 13
3	(South Korea) (Sri Lanka)	Ki Dong-ju / Shin Tae-yang; Lochana de Silva / Chamath Dias	21; 7	21; 10
4	(South Korea) (Sri Lanka)	Jang Eun-seo / Lee Jung-hyun; Dilmi Dias / Anurangi Masakorala	21; 12	21; 12
5	(South Korea) (Sri Lanka)	Wang Chan / Jeong Na-eun; Vikum Fernando / Jananuwani Amanda	21; 8	21; 12

==== India vs Kazakhstan ====
India
5
Jaya Raya Sports Hall Training Center, Court 5
14 July 2018, 09:00 UTC+7

Kazakhstan
0

			1	2	3
1	(India) (Kazakhstan)	Aakarshi Kashyap; Iya Gordeyeva	21; 5	21; 4
2	(India) (Kazakhstan)	Lakshya Sen; Dmitriy Panarin	21; 15	21; 12
3	(India) (Kazakhstan)	Simran Singhi / Ritika Thaker; Iya Gordeyeva / Aisha Zhumabek	21; 7	21; 8
4	(India) (Kazakhstan)	Manjit Singh Khwairakpam / Dingku Singh Konthoujam; Damir Abdullayev / Kemran Tajibullayev	21; 5	21; 6
5	(India) (Kazakhstan)	S. S. K. Podile / Srishti Jupudi; Dmitriy Panarin / Aisha Zhumabek	21; 7	21; 9

==== South Korea vs Kazakhstan ====
South Korea
5
Jaya Raya Sports Hall Training Center, Court 1
15 July 2018, 09:00 UTC+7

Kazakhstan
0

			1	2	3
1	(South Korea) (Kazakhstan)	Lee So-yul; Aisha Zhumabek	21; 6	21; 4
2	(South Korea) (Kazakhstan)	Park Hyeon-seung; Dmitriy Panarin	22; 20	21; 10
3	(South Korea) (Kazakhstan)	Jang Eun-seo / Lee Eun-ji; Iya Gordeyeva / Aisha Zhumabek	21; 7	21; 1
4	(South Korea) (Kazakhstan)	Ki Dong-ju / Kim Seung-hyun; Damir Abdullayev / Kemran Tajibullayev	21; 8	21; 5
5	(South Korea) (Kazakhstan)	Shin Tae-yang / Lee Jung-hyun; Dmitriy Panarin / Iya Gordeyeva	21; 14	21; 11

==== India vs Sri Lanka ====
India
5
Jaya Raya Sports Hall Training Center, Court 3
15 July 2018, 09:00 UTC+7

Sri Lanka
0

			1	2	3
1	(India) (Sri Lanka)	Manjit Singh Khwairakpam / Dingku Singh Konthoujam; Tharindu Ambegoda / Vikum Fernando	21; 10	21; 15
2	(India) (Sri Lanka)	Aakarshi Kashyap; Dilmi Dias	21; 10	21; 12
3	(India) (Sri Lanka)	Priyanshu Rajawat; Chamath Dias	21; 11	21; 14
4	(India) (Sri Lanka)	Simran Singhi / Ritika Thaker; Jananuwani Amanda / Anurangi Masakorala	21; 18	21; 15
5	(India) (Sri Lanka)	S. S. K. Podile / Srishti Jupudi; Chamath Dias / Dilmi Dias	21; 10	21; 15

==== Kazakhstan vs Sri Lanka ====
Kazakhstan
2
Jaya Raya Sports Hall Training Center, Court 2
15 July 2018, 16:00 UTC+7

Sri Lanka
3

			1	2	3
1	(Kazakhstan) (Sri Lanka)	Aisha Zhumabek; Dilmi Dias	8; 21	10; 21
2	(Kazakhstan) (Sri Lanka)	Dmitriy Panarin; Vikum Fernando	21; 11	21; 15
3	(Kazakhstan) (Sri Lanka)	Iya Gordeyeva / Aisha Zhumabek; Jananuwani Amanda / Anurangi Masakorala	15; 21	22; 24
4	(Kazakhstan) (Sri Lanka)	Damir Abdullayev / Kemran Tajibullayev; Tharindu Ambegoda / Vikum Fernando	2; 21	13; 21
5	(Kazakhstan) (Sri Lanka)	Dmitriy Panarin / Iya Gordeyeva; Chamath Dias / Dilmi Dias	21; 19	21; 19

==== South Korea vs India ====
South Korea
4
Jaya Raya Sports Hall Training Center, Court 3
15 July 2018, 16:00 UTC+7

India
1

			1	2	3
1	(South Korea) (India)	Ki Dong-ju / Shin Tae-yang; Manjit Singh Khwairakpam / Dingku Singh Konthoujam	21; 17	21; 11
2	(South Korea) (India)	Park Ga-eun; Aakarshi Kashyap	21; 23	21; 13	21; 9
3	(South Korea) (India)	Kim Hyeong-jung; Lakshya Sen	14; 21	13; 21
4	(South Korea) (India)	Jang Eun-seo / Lee Eun-ji; Simran Singhi / Ritika Thaker	21; 15	21; 9
5	(South Korea) (India)	Wang Chan / Jeong Na-eun; S. S. K. Podile / Srishti Jupudi	21; 13	18; 21	23; 21

=== Group D ===
Pos	Team	Pld	W	L	MF	MA	MD	GF	GA	GD	PF	PA	PD	Pts	Qualification	Japan	Indonesia	Singapore
1	Japan	2	2	0	8	2	+6	17	6	+11	456	392	+64	2	Advance to knockout stage	—	3–2	5–0
2	Indonesia (H)	2	1	1	7	3	+4	15	7	+8	426	361	+65	1	Advance to knockout stage		—	5–0
3	Singapore	2	0	2	0	10	−10	1	20	−19	312	441	−129	0				—

Source: BadmintonCN
(H) Host

==== Japan vs Singapore ====
Japan
5
Jaya Raya Sports Hall Training Center, Court 1
14 July 2018, 16:00 UTC+7

Singapore
0

			1	2	3
1	(Japan) (Singapore)	Hiroki Midorikawa / Natsu Saito; Zhi Rui Bernice Lim / Han Zhuo Toh	21; 19	21; 15
2	(Japan) (Singapore)	Taiki Kato; Joel Koh	21; 11	17; 21	25; 23
3	(Japan) (Singapore)	Hirari Mizui; Insyirah Khan	21; 18	21; 7
4	(Japan) (Singapore)	Hiroki Midorikawa / Hiroki Nakayama; Darrion Michael Ng / Aaron Yong	21; 14	21; 15
5	(Japan) (Singapore)	Natsu Saito / Rumi Yoshida; Insyirah Khan / Bernice Lim	21; 16	21; 17

==== Indonesia vs Singapore ====
Indonesia
5
Jaya Raya Sports Hall Training Center, Court 4
15 July 2018, 09:00 UTC+7

Singapore
0

			1	2	3
1	(Indonesia) (Singapore)	Ghifari Anandaffa Prihardika / Lisa Ayu Kusumawati; Bernice Lim / Toh Han Zhuo	21; 18	21; 12
2	(Indonesia) (Singapore)	Ikhsan Rumbay; Joel Koh	21; 13	21; 15
3	(Indonesia) (Singapore)	Putri Kusuma Wardani; Insyirah Khan	21; 14	21; 16
4	(Indonesia) (Singapore)	Rehan Naufal Kusharjanto / Pramudya Kusumawardana; Abel Tan / Toh Han Zhuo	21; 19	21; 14
5	(Indonesia) (Singapore)	Agatha Imanuela / Siti Fadia Silva Ramadhanti; Insyirah Khan / Zhi Rui Bernice Lim	21; 4	21; 11

==== Indonesia vs Japan ====
Indonesia
2
Jaya Raya Sports Hall Training Center, Court 1
15 July 2018, 16:00 UTC+7

Japan
3

			1	2	3
1	(Indonesia) (Japan)	Rehan Naufal Kusharjanto / Siti Fadia Silva Ramadhanti; Hiroki Midorikawa / Natsu Saito	13; 21	21; 12	17; 21
2	(Indonesia) (Japan)	Alberto Alvin Yulianto; Taiki Kato	20; 22	18; 21
3	(Indonesia) (Japan)	Pramudya Kusumawardana / Ghifari Anandaffa Prihardika; Hiroki Midorikawa / Hiroki Nakayama	17; 21	21; 6	23; 21
4	(Indonesia) (Japan)	Stephanie Widjaja; Hirari Mizui	16; 21	7; 21
5	(Indonesia) (Japan)	Agatha Imanuela / Siti Fadia Silva Ramadhanti; Natsu Saito / Rumi Yoshida	21; 18	22; 20

== Knockout stage ==
=== Bracket ===
Quarter-finals
16 July
China	3
Chinese Taipei	0
16 July
Thailand	1
Indonesia	3
16 July
India	1
Japan	3
16 July
Malaysia	3
South Korea	2

Semi-finals
16 July
China	3
Indonesia	1
16 July
Japan	3
Malaysia	0

Final
17 July
China	3
Japan	0

=== Quarter-finals ===
==== China vs Chinese Taipei ====
China
3
Jaya Raya Sports Hall Training Center, Court 2
16 July 2018, 09:00 UTC+7

Chinese Taipei
0

			1	2	3
1	(China) (Chinese Taipei)	Guo Xinwa / Liu Xuanxuan; Lin Yu-chieh / Li Zi-qing	21; 14	21; 14
2	(China) (Chinese Taipei)	Li Shifeng; Chen Shiau-cheng	19; 21	21; 15	21; 10
3	(China) (Chinese Taipei)	Di Zijian / Wang Chang; Wei Chun-wei / Wu Guan-xun	21; 7	21; 14
4	(China) (Chinese Taipei)	Wang Zhiyi; Lin Sih-yun				not played
5	(China) (Chinese Taipei)	Liu Xuanxuan / Xia Yuting; Li Zi-qing / Teng Chun-hsun				not played

==== Thailand vs Indonesia ====
Thailand
1
Jaya Raya Sports Hall Training Center, Court 1
16 July 2018, 09:00 UTC+7

Indonesia
3

			1	2	3
1	(Thailand) (Indonesia)	Phittayaporn Chaiwan; Putri Kusuma Wardani	16; 21	17; 21
2	(Thailand) (Indonesia)	Kunlavut Vitidsarn; Ikhsan Rumbay	21; 15	21; 15
3	(Thailand) (Indonesia)	Benyapa Aimsaard / Chasinee Korepap; Agatha Imanuela / Siti Fadia Silva Ramadhanti	17; 21	17; 21
4	(Thailand) (Indonesia)	Thanawin Madee / Wachirawit Sothon; Rehan Naufal Kusharjanto / Pramudya Kusumawardana	14; 21	23; 21	15; 21
5	(Thailand) (Indonesia)	Kunlavut Vitidsarn / Phittayaporn Chaiwan; Ghifari Anandaffa Prihardika / Siti Fadia Silva Ramadhanti				not played

==== India vs Japan ====
India
1
Jaya Raya Sports Hall Training Center, Court 3
16 July 2018, 09:00 UTC+7

Japan
3

			1	2	3
1	(India) (Japan)	S. S. K. Podile / Srishti Jupudi; Hiroki Midorikawa / Natsu Saito	8; 21	14; 21
2	(India) (Japan)	Lakshya Sen; Taiki Kato	21; 13	21; 19
3	(India) (Japan)	Vishnuvardhan Goud Panjala / S. S. K. Podile; Hiroki Midorikawa / Hiroki Nakayama	9; 21	21; 17	8; 21
4	(India) (Japan)	Aakarshi Kashyap; Hirari Mizui	9; 21	17; 21
5	(India) (Japan)	Simran Singhi / Ritika Thaker; Natsu Saito / Rumi Yoshida				not played

==== Malaysia vs South Korea ====
Malaysia
3
Jaya Raya Sports Hall Training Center, Court 4
16 July 2018, 09:00 UTC+7

South Korea
2

			1	2	3
1	(Malaysia) (South Korea)	Chia Wei Jie / Toh Ee Wei; Jeong Na Eun / Wang Chan	21; 18	21; 16
2	(Malaysia) (South Korea)	Ng Tze Yong; Choi Ji-hoon	21; 16	9; 21	21; 17
3	(Malaysia) (South Korea)	Chang Yee Jun / Chua Yue Chern; Ki Dong-ju / Shin Tae-yang	23; 21	17; 21	13; 21
4	(Malaysia) (South Korea)	Eoon Qi Xuan; Park Ga-eun	11; 21	18; 21
5	(Malaysia) (South Korea)	Pearly Tan / Toh Ee Wei; Jang Eun-seo / Lee Eun-ji	21; 18	21; 13

=== Semi-finals ===
==== China vs Indonesia ====
China
3
Jaya Raya Sports Hall Training Center, Court 4
16 July 2018, 16:00 UTC+7

Indonesia
1

			1	2	3
1	(China) (Indonesia)	Guo Xinwa / Liu Xuanxuan; Ghifari Anandaffa Prihardika / Siti Fadia Silva Ramadhanti	17; 21	21; 17	25; 23
2	(China) (Indonesia)	Bai Yupeng; Ikhsan Leonardo Imanuel Rumbay	18; 21	14; 21
3	(China) (Indonesia)	Di Zijian / Wang Chang; Rehan Naufal Kusharjanto / Pramudya Kusumawardana	21; 14	22; 20
4	(China) (Indonesia)	Wang Zhiyi; Putri Kusuma Wardani	21; 14	21; 13
5	(China) (Indonesia)	Liu Xuanxuan / Xia Yuting; Agatha Imanuela / Siti Fadia Silva Ramadhanti				not played

==== Japan vs Malaysia ====
Japan
3
Jaya Raya Sports Hall Training Center, Court 1
16 July 2018, 16:00 UTC+7

Malaysia
0

			1	2	3
1	(Japan) (Malaysia)	Hiroki Midorikawa / Natsu Saito; Chia Wei Jie / Toh Ee Wei	21; 16	21; 15
2	(Japan) (Malaysia)	Taiki Kato; Ng Tze Yong	21; 13	23; 25	24; 22
3	(Japan) (Malaysia)	Hiroki Midorikawa / Hiroki Nakayama; Yee Jun Chang / Chua Yue Chern	21; 17	21; 14
4	(Japan) (Malaysia)	Hirari Mizui; Eoon Qi Xuan				not played
5	(Japan) (Malaysia)	Natsu Saito / Rumi Yoshida; Pearly Tan / Toh Ee Wei				not played

=== Final ===
==== China vs Japan ====
China
3
Jaya Raya Sports Hall Training Center, Court 1
17 July 2018, 10:00 UTC+7

Japan
0

			1	2	3
1	(China) (Japan)	Guo Xinwa / Liu Xuanxuan; Hiroki Midorikawa / Natsu Saito	21; 19	21; 14
2	(China) (Japan)	Li Shifeng; Taiki Kato	21; 16	21; 15
3	(China) (Japan)	Di Zijian / Wang Chang; Hiroki Midorikawa / Hiroki Nakayama	20; 22	21; 9	21; 12
4	(China) (Japan)	Wang Zhiyi; Hirari Mizui				not played
5	(China) (Japan)	Liu Xuanxuan / Xia Yuting; Natsu Saito / Rumi Yoshida				not played
