= 2002 Asian Junior Badminton Championships – Girls' team =

Badminton championship in Kuala Lumpur, Malaysia

Girls' team at the 2002 Asian Junior Badminton Championships
- Venue: Kuala Lumpur Badminton Stadium
- Location: Kuala Lumpur, Malaysia
- Dates: 14–16 July 2002

The girls' team tournament at the 2002 Asian Junior Badminton Championships took place from 14 to 16 July at the Kuala Lumpur Badminton Stadium in Kuala Lumpur, Malaysia. A total of 12 countries competed in this event.

== Results ==
=== Bracket ===
Round of 16
Philippines	3
Sri Lanka	1
Malaysia	3
Chinese Taipei	0
Singapore	3
Macau	0
India	3
Hong Kong	1

Quarter-finals
China	3
Philippines	0
Japan	3
Malaysia	1
Singapore	0
South Korea	3
India	w/o
Indonesia

Semi-finals
China	3
Japan	0
South Korea	3
India	0

Final
China	3
South Korea	1

=== Final ===
China
3
Kuala Lumpur Badminton Stadium
16 July 2002

South Korea
1

			1	2	3
1	(China) (South Korea)	Zhu Lin; Seo Yoon-hee	11; 8	10; 13	2; 11
2	(China) (South Korea)	Zhu Jingjing; Lee Yun-hwa	10; 13	13; 10	11; 4
3	(China) (South Korea)	Jiang Yanjiao; Hwang Hye-youn	11; 3	11; 9
4	(China) (South Korea)	Du Jing / Rong Lu; Lee Yun-hwa / Yim Ah-young	15; 8	15; 4
5	(China) (South Korea)	Chen Lanting / Yu Yang; Hwang Hye-youn / Seo Yoon-hee				not played
