= 2007 Asian Junior Badminton Championships – Teams event =

Badminton championship in Kuala Lumpur, Malaysia

Teams event at the 2007 Asian Junior Badminton Championships
- Venue: Stadium Juara
- Location: Kuala Lumpur, Malaysia
- Dates: 15–18 July 2007

The team tournament at the 2007 Asian Junior Badminton Championships took place from 15 to 18 July 2007 at Stadium Juara in Kuala Lumpur, Malaysia. A total of 21 countries competed in this event.

== Group stage ==
=== Group A ===
Pos	Team	Pld	W	L	MF	MA	MD	GF	GA	GD	PF	PA	PD	Pts	Qualification	Malaysia	Chinese Taipei for Olympic games	North Korea
1	Malaysia (H)	2	2	0	10	0	+10	20	0	+20	424	239	+185	2	Advance to knockout stage	—	5–0	5–0
2	Chinese Taipei	2	1	1	5	5	0	10	10	0	358	322	+36	1			—	5–0
3	North Korea	2	0	2	0	10	−10	0	20	−20	199	420	−221	0				—

Source: BAM
(H) Host

=== Group B ===
Pos	Team	Pld	W	L	MF	MA	MD	GF	GA	GD	PF	PA	PD	Pts	Qualification	People's Republic of China	India	Brunei
1	China	2	2	0	10	0	+10	20	0	+20	420	169	+251	2	Advance to knockout stage	—	5–0	5–0
2	India	2	1	1	5	5	0	10	10	0	332	295	+37	1			—	5–0
3	Brunei	2	0	2	0	10	−10	0	20	−20	132	420	−288	0				—

Source: BAM

=== Group C ===
Pos	Team	Pld	W	L	MF	MA	MD	GF	GA	GD	PF	PA	PD	Pts	Qualification	Indonesia	Macau	Kazakhstan
1	Indonesia	2	2	0	10	0	+10	20	0	+20	420	171	+249	2	Advance to knockout stage	—	5–0	5–0
2	Macau	2	1	1	3	7	−4	6	14	−8	250	369	−119	1			—	3–2
3	Kazakhstan	2	0	2	2	8	−6	4	16	−12	260	390	−130	0				—

Source: BAM

=== Group D ===
Pos	Team	Pld	W	L	MF	MA	MD	GF	GA	GD	PF	PA	PD	Pts	Qualification	South Korea	Philippines	Iraq
1	South Korea	2	2	0	10	0	+10	20	0	+20	420	118	+302	2	Advance to knockout stage	—	5–0	5–0
2	Philippines	2	1	1	5	5	0	10	10	0	284	302	−18	1			—	5–0
3	Iraq	2	0	2	0	10	−10	0	20	−20	136	420	−284	0				—

Source: BAM

=== Group E ===
Pos	Team	Pld	W	L	MF	MA	MD	GF	GA	GD	PF	PA	PD	Pts	Qualification	Japan	Thailand	Bangladesh
1	Japan	2	2	0	9	1	+8	27	10	+17	428	224	+204	2	Advance to knockout stage	—	4–1	5–0
2	Thailand	2	1	1	6	4	+2	12	9	+3	377	319	+58	1			—	5–0
3	Bangladesh	2	0	2	0	10	−10	0	20	−20	162	424	−262	0				—

Source: BAM

=== Group F ===
Pos	Team	Pld	W	L	MF	MA	MD	GF	GA	GD	PF	PA	PD	Pts	Qualification	Singapore	Vietnam	Sri Lanka
1	Singapore	2	2	0	8	2	+6	17	7	+10	480	383	+97	2	Advance to knockout stage	—	3–2	5–0
2	Vietnam	2	1	1	7	3	+4	17	7	+10	469	381	+88	1			—	5–0
3	Sri Lanka	2	0	2	0	10	−10	0	20	−20	235	420	−185	0				—

Source: BAM

=== Group G ===
Pos	Team	Pld	W	L	MF	MA	MD	GF	GA	GD	PF	PA	PD	Pts	Qualification	Hong Kong	Cambodia	Jordan
1	Hong Kong	2	2	0	10	0	+10	20	0	+20	420	173	+247	2	Advance to knockout stage	—	5–0	5–0
2	Cambodia	2	1	1	4	6	−2	9	14	−5	286	367	−81	1			—	4–1
3	Jordan	2	0	2	1	9	−8	3	18	−15	234	400	−166	0				—

Source: BAM

== Knockout stage ==
=== Bracket ===
Quarter-finals
South Korea	2
Japan	3
Indonesia	3
Singapore	1
Hong Kong	0
China	3

Semi-finals
Malaysia	3
Japan	1
Indonesia	0
China	3

Final
Malaysia	3
China	0

=== Semi-finals ===
Malaysia
3
Stadium Juara
17 July 2007

Japan
1

			1	2	3
1	(Malaysia) (Japan)	Tan Wee Kiong / Woon Khe Wei; Kenichi Tago / Shizuka Uchida	19; 21	21; 11	21; 9
2	(Malaysia) (Japan)	Mohamad Arif Abdul Latif; Riichi Takeshita	21; 7	21; 19
3	(Malaysia) (Japan)	Lyddia Cheah; Shizuka Uchida	9; 21	21; 7	19; 21
4	(Malaysia) (Japan)	Ng Hui Lin / Goh Liu Ying; Yuriko Miki / Reika Kakiiwa	21; 12	21; 14
5	(Malaysia) (Japan)	Mohd Lutfi Zaim Abdul Khalid / Tan Wee Kiong; Takeshi Kamura / Keigo Sonoda				not played

China
3
Stadium Juara
17 July 2007

Indonesia
0

			1	2	3
1	(China) (Indonesia)	Chen Long; Nandang Arif	21; 15	21; 17
2	(China) (Indonesia)	Liu Jie; Maria Febe Kusumastuti	23; 21	20; 22	21; 15
3	(China) (Indonesia)	Li Tian / Wang Xiaoli; Afiat Yuris Wirawan / Richi Puspita Dili	9; 21	21; 12	21; 10
4	(China) (Indonesia)	Qiu Zihan / Zhang Nan; Aditya Arifin / Albert Saputra				not played
5	(China) (Indonesia)	Lin Shen / Xie Jing; Richi Puspita Dili / Debby Susanto				not played

=== Final ===
Malaysia
3
Stadium Juara
18 July 2007

China
0

			1	2	3
1	(Malaysia) (China)	Tan Wee Kiong / Woon Khe Wei; Li Tian / Wang Xiaoli	21; 15	21; 8
2	(Malaysia) (China)	Lyddia Cheah; Liu Jie	21; 18	21; 17
3	(Malaysia) (China)	Mohamad Arif Abdul Latif; Chen Long	21; 19	22; 20
4	(Malaysia) (China)	Ng Hui Lin / Goh Liu Ying; Lin Shen / Xie Jing				not played
5	(Malaysia) (China)	Mohd Lutfi Zaim Abdul Khalid / Tan Wee Kiong; Qiu Zihan / Zhang Nan				not played
