= 2017 Badminton Asia Junior Championships – Teams event =

Badminton championship in Jakarta, Indonesia

Teams event at the 2017 Badminton Asia Junior Championships
- Venue: Jaya Raya Sports Hall Training Center
- Location: Jakarta, Indonesia
- Dates: 22–25 July 2017

The team tournament at the 2017 Badminton Asia Junior Championships took place from 22 to 25 July 2017 at the Jaya Raya Sports Hall Training Center in Jakarta, Indonesia. A total of 18 countries competed in this event.

== Group stage ==
=== Group A ===
| Pos | Team | Pld | W | L | MF | MA | MD | GF | GA | GD | PF | PA | PD | Pts | Qualification | South Korea | People's Republic of China | India | Uzbekistan |
|---|---|---|---|---|---|---|---|---|---|---|---|---|---|---|---|---|---|---|---|
| 1 | South Korea | 3 | 3 | 0 | 11 | 4 | +7 | 24 | 11 | +13 | 688 | 516 | +172 | 3 | Advance to knockout stage | — | 3–2 | 3–2 | 5–0 |
| 2 | China | 3 | 2 | 1 | 11 | 4 | +7 | 25 | 9 | +16 | 661 | 492 | +169 | 2 | Advance to knockout stage | | — | 4–1 | 5–0 |
| 3 | India | 3 | 1 | 2 | 8 | 7 | +1 | 17 | 16 | +1 | 591 | 547 | +44 | 1 | | | | — | 5–0 |
| 4 | Uzbekistan | 3 | 0 | 3 | 0 | 15 | −15 | 0 | 30 | −30 | 245 | 630 | −385 | 0 | | | | | — |

Source: BadmintonCN

==== South Korea vs Uzbekistan ====
South Korea
5
Jaya Raya Sports Hall Training Center, Court 1
22 July 2017, 09:00 UTC+7

Uzbekistan
0

| | | | 1 | 2 | 3 |
|---|---|---|---|---|---|
| 1 | (South Korea) (Uzbekistan) | Kim Moon-jun / Lee Yu-lim; Temur Turakhonov / Shirina Shavkatova | 21; 7 | 21; 12 |
| 2 | (South Korea) (Uzbekistan) | Shin Tae-yang; Abdurasul Khadjaev | 21; 16 | 21; 6 |
| 3 | (South Korea) (Uzbekistan) | Sim Yu-jin; Sevinch Sodikova | 21; 8 | 21; 7 |
| 4 | (South Korea) (Uzbekistan) | Lee Sang-min / Na Sung-seung; Abdurasul Khadjaev / Temur Turakhonov | 21; 6 | 21; 8 |
| 5 | (South Korea) (Uzbekistan) | Kim Min-ji / Seong Ah-yeong; Shirina Shavkatova / Sevinch Sodikova | 21; 7 | 21; 4 |

==== India vs China ====
India
1
Jaya Raya Sports Hall Training Center, Court 2
22 July 2017, 09:00 UTC+7

China
4

| | | | 1 | 2 | 3 |
|---|---|---|---|---|---|
| 1 | (India) (China) | Dhruv Kapila / Mithula Umakant; Fan Qiuyue / Li Wenmei | 18; 21 | 17; 21 |
| 2 | (India) (China) | Lakshya Sen; Gao Zhengze | 20; 22 | 21; 16 | 21; 12 |
| 3 | (India) (China) | Krishna Prasad Garaga / Dhruv Kapila; Chen Sihang / Fan Qiuyue | 14; 21 | 15; 21 |
| 4 | (India) (China) | Aakarshi Kashyap; Han Yue | 7; 21 | 19; 21 |
| 5 | (India) (China) | Rutaparna Panda / Mithula Umakant; Liu Xuanxuan / Zhou Meng | 14; 21 | 13; 21 |

==== South Korea vs China ====
South Korea
3
Jaya Raya Sports Hall Training Center, Court 1
22 July 2017, 17:00 UTC+7

China
2

| | | | 1 | 2 | 3 |
|---|---|---|---|---|---|
| 1 | (South Korea) (China) | Na Sung-seung / Seong Ah-yeong; Di Zijian / Li Wenmei | 21; 10 | 17; 21 | 21; 17 |
| 2 | (South Korea) (China) | Woo Seung-hoon; Bai Yupeng | 17; 21 | 21; 7 | 21; 19 |
| 3 | (South Korea) (China) | Kang Min-hyuk / Kim Moon-jun; Chen Sihang / Fan Qiuyue | 24; 22 | 21; 18 |
| 4 | (South Korea) (China) | Park Ga-eun; Han Yue | 18; 21 | 15; 21 |
| 5 | (South Korea) (China) | Baek Ha-na / Lee Yu-lim; Li Wenmei / Liu Xuanxuan | 14; 21 | 21; 14 | 15; 21 |

==== India vs Uzbekistan ====
India
5
Jaya Raya Sports Hall Training Center, Court 2
22 July 2023, 17:00 UTC+7

Uzbekistan
0

| | | | 1 | 2 | 3 |
|---|---|---|---|---|---|
| 1 | (India) (Uzbekistan) | Swarnaraj Bora / Prashi Joshi; Abdurasul Khadjaev / Sevinch Sodikova | 21; 19 | 21; 17 |
| 2 | (India) (Uzbekistan) | Kartikey Gulshan Kumar; Temur Turakhonov | 21; 5 | 21; 10 |
| 3 | (India) (Uzbekistan) | Ashmita Chaliha; Shirina Shavkatova | 21; 5 | 21; 4 |
| 4 | (India) (Uzbekistan) | Swarnaraj Bora / Krishna Prasad Garaga; Abdurasul Khadjaev / Temur Turakhonov | 21; 5 | 21; 10 |
| 5 | (India) (Uzbekistan) | K. Ashwini Bhat / Rutaparna Panda; Shirina Shavkatova / Sevinch Sodikova | 21; 10 | 21; 12 |

==== South Korea vs India ====
South Korea
3
Jaya Raya Sports Hall Training Center, Court 1
23 July 2017, 13:00 UTC+7

India
2

| | | | 1 | 2 | 3 |
|---|---|---|---|---|---|
| 1 | (South Korea) (India) | Na Sung-seung / Seong Ah-yeong; Dhruv Kapila / Mithula Umakant | 18; 21 | 21; 8 | 21; 19 |
| 2 | (South Korea) (India) | Woo Seung-hoon; Lakshya Sen | 18; 21 | 10; 21 |
| 3 | (South Korea) (India) | Kang Min-hyuk / Kim Moon-jun; Krishna Prasad Garaga / Dhruv Kapila | 21; 9 | 18; 21 | 21; 23 |
| 4 | (South Korea) (India) | Sim Yu-jin; Aakarshi Kashyap | 21; 19 | 21; 16 |
| 5 | (South Korea) (India) | Baek Ha-na / Lee Yu-lim; Rutaparna Panda / Mithula Umakant | 21; 16 | 21; 8 |

==== China vs Uzbekistan ====
China
5
Jaya Raya Sports Hall Training Center, Court 2
23 July 2017, 13:00 UTC+7

Uzbekistan
0

| | | | 1 | 2 | 3 |
|---|---|---|---|---|---|
| 1 | (China) (Uzbekistan) | Di Zijian / Li Wenmei; Shirina Shavkatova / Temur Turakhonov | 21; 13 | 21; 10 |
| 2 | (China) (Uzbekistan) | Gao Zhengze; Abdurasul Khadjaev | 21; 3 | 21; 15 |
| 3 | (China) (Uzbekistan) | Wang Zhiyi; Sevinch Sodikova | 21; 2 | 21; 2 |
| 4 | (China) (Uzbekistan) | Chen Sihang / Fan Qiuyue; Abdurasul Khadjaev / Temur Turakhonov | 21; 5 | 21; 6 |
| 5 | (China) (Uzbekistan) | Liu Xuanxuan / Zhou Meng; Shirina Shavkatova / Sevinch Sodikova | 21; 6 | 21; 5 |

=== Group B ===
| Pos | Team | Pld | W | L | MF | MA | MD | GF | GA | GD | PF | PA | PD | Pts | Qualification | Malaysia | Singapore | Vietnam | Myanmar | Macau |
|---|---|---|---|---|---|---|---|---|---|---|---|---|---|---|---|---|---|---|---|---|
| 1 | Malaysia | 4 | 4 | 0 | 19 | 1 | +18 | 39 | 3 | +36 | 878 | 464 | +414 | 4 | Advance to knockout stage | — | 5–0 | 5–0 | 4–1 | 5–0 |
| 2 | Singapore | 4 | 3 | 1 | 13 | 7 | +6 | 26 | 18 | +8 | 773 | 732 | +41 | 3 | Advance to knockout stage | | — | 5–0 | 3–2 | 5–0 |
| 3 | Vietnam | 4 | 2 | 2 | 7 | 13 | −6 | 17 | 27 | −10 | 741 | 832 | −91 | 2 | | | | — | 3–2 | 4–1 |
| 4 | Myanmar | 4 | 1 | 3 | 8 | 12 | −4 | 17 | 25 | −8 | 613 | 758 | −145 | 1 | | | | | — | 3–2 |
| 5 | Macau | 4 | 0 | 4 | 3 | 17 | −14 | 8 | 34 | −26 | 594 | 813 | −219 | 0 | | | | | | — |

Source: BadmintonCN

==== Malaysia vs Myanmar ====
Malaysia
4
Jaya Raya Sports Hall Training Center, Court 3
22 July 2017, 09:00 UTC+7

Myanmar
1

| | | | 1 | 2 | 3 |
|---|---|---|---|---|---|
| 1 | (Malaysia) (Myanmar) | Leong Jun Hao; Arkar Phone Myat | 21; 9 | 21; 10 |
| 2 | (Malaysia) (Myanmar) | Goh Jin Wei; Thwe Tar Oo | 21; 3 | 21; 6 |
| 3 | (Malaysia) (Myanmar) | Chang Yee Jun / Ng Eng Cheong; Arkar Phone Myat / Hein Si Thu Toe | 21; 9 | 21; 9 |
| 4 | (Malaysia) (Myanmar) | Pearly Tan / Toh Ee Wei; Thwe Tar Oo / Lin Let Phyo | 21; 3 | 21; 7 |
| 5 | (Malaysia) (Myanmar) | Man Wei Chong / Tan Sueh Jeou; Aung Myo Htoo / Thet Htar Thuzar | 21; 17 | 18; 21 | 15; 21 |

==== Singapore vs Macau ====
Singapore
5
Jaya Raya Sports Hall Training Center, Court 4
22 July 2017, 09:00 UTC+7

Macau
0

| | | | 1 | 2 | 3 |
|---|---|---|---|---|---|
| 1 | (Singapore) (Macau) | Sito Jia Rong; Ao I Kuan | 21; 8 | 22; 20 |
| 2 | (Singapore) (Macau) | Joel Koh; Pui Pang Fong | 21; 17 | 21; 17 |
| 3 | (Singapore) (Macau) | Insyirah Khan / Sito Jia Rong; Ao I Kuan / Gong Xue Xin | 21; 18 | 21; 16 |
| 4 | (Singapore) (Macau) | Abel Tan / Toh Han Zhuo; Che Pui Ngai / Lam Hou Him | 21; 8 | 21; 13 |
| 5 | (Singapore) (Macau) | Bernice Lim / Royston Loh; Gong Xue Xin / Pui Pang Fong | 21; 19 | 13; 21 | 22; 20 |

==== Vietnam vs Myanmar ====
Vietnam
3
Jaya Raya Sports Hall Training Center, Court 3
22 July 2017, 13:00 UTC+7

Myanmar
2

| | | | 1 | 2 | 3 |
|---|---|---|---|---|---|
| 1 | (Vietnam) (Myanmar) | Trần Thị Phương Thúy; Thet Htar Thuzar | 19; 21 | 14; 21 |
| 2 | (Vietnam) (Myanmar) | Nguyễn Hải Đăng; Aung Myo Htoo | 21; 18 | 21; 17 |
| 3 | (Vietnam) (Myanmar) | Phạm Ngọc Bích / Trần Thị Phương Thúy; Thwe Tar Oo / Lin Let Phyo | 21; 6 | 21; 10 |
| 4 | (Vietnam) (Myanmar) | Lê Thanh Lâm / Nguyễn Xuân Mạnh; Arkar Phone Myat / Hein Si Thu Toe | 21; 15 | 21; 19 |
| 5 | (Vietnam) (Myanmar) | Vũ Minh Phúc / Phạm Ngọc Bích; Aung Myo Htoo / Thet Htar Thuzar | 11; 21 | 13; 21 |

==== Singapore vs Vietnam ====
Singapore
5
Jaya Raya Sports Hall Training Center, Court 3
22 July 2017, 17:00 UTC+7

Vietnam
0

| | | | 1 | 2 | 3 |
|---|---|---|---|---|---|
| 1 | (Singapore) (Vietnam) | Toh Han Zhuo / Insyirah Khan; Vũ Minh Phúc / Phạm Ngọc Bích | 21; 6 | 19; 21 | 21; 9 |
| 2 | (Singapore) (Vietnam) | Joel Koh; Nguyễn Hải Đăng | 21; 14 | 21; 17 |
| 3 | (Singapore) (Vietnam) | Insyirah Khan; Trần Thị Phương Thúy | 21; 8 | 21; 13 |
| 4 | (Singapore) (Vietnam) | Abel Tan / Toh Han Zhuo; Lê Thanh Lâm / Nguyễn Xuân Mạnh | 20; 22 | 21; 15 | 21; 18 |
| 5 | (Singapore) (Vietnam) | Bernice Lim / Sito Jia Rong; Phạm Ngọc Bích / Trần Thị Phương Thúy | 21; 14 | 21; 12 |

==== Malaysia vs Macau ====
Malaysia
5
Jaya Raya Sports Hall Training Center, Court 4
22 July 2017, 17:00 UTC+7

Macau
0

| | | | 1 | 2 | 3 |
|---|---|---|---|---|---|
| 1 | (Malaysia) (Macau) | Man Wei Chong / Ng Eng Cheong; Che Pui Ngai / Lam Hou Him | 21; 8 | 21; 11 |
| 2 | (Malaysia) (Macau) | Goh Jin Wei; Zou Zhuo Lin | 21; 3 | 21; 7 |
| 3 | (Malaysia) (Macau) | Sim Fong Hau; Ao Fei Long | 21; 10 | 21; 4 |
| 4 | (Malaysia) (Macau) | Tan Sueh Jeou / Toh Ee Wei; Ao I Kuan / Wong Cheng Wa | 21; 6 | 21; 13 |
| 5 | (Malaysia) (Macau) | Chang Yee Jun / Pearly Tan; Pui Pang Fong / Gong Xue Xin | 21; 12 | 21; 14 |

==== Singapore vs Myanmar ====
Singapore
3
Jaya Raya Sports Hall Training Center, Court 3
23 July 2017, 09:00 UTC+7

Myanmar
2

| | | | 1 | 2 | 3 |
|---|---|---|---|---|---|
| 1 | (Singapore) (Myanmar) | Toh Han Zhuo / Insyirah Khan; Aung Myo Htoo / Thet Htar Thuzar | 17; 21 | 14; 21 |
| 2 | (Singapore) (Myanmar) | Joel Koh; Arkar Phone Myat | 21; 12 | 21; 17 |
| 3 | (Singapore) (Myanmar) | Sito Jia Rong; Thet Htar Thuzar | 12; 21 | 15; 21 |
| 4 | (Singapore) (Myanmar) | Abel Tan / Toh Han Zhuo; Aung Myo Htoo / Arkar Phone Myat | 21; 16 | 18; 21 | 21; 12 |
| 5 | (Singapore) (Myanmar) | Insyirah Khan / Bernice Lim; Thwe Tar Oo / Lin Let Phyo | 21; 5 | 21; 9 |

==== Malaysia vs Vietnam ====
Malaysia
5
Jaya Raya Sports Hall Training Center, Court 4
23 July 2017, 09:00 UTC+7

Vietnam
0

| | | | 1 | 2 | 3 |
|---|---|---|---|---|---|
| 1 | (Malaysia) (Vietnam) | Chang Yee Jun / Pearly Tan; Nguyễn Xuân Mạnh / Phạm Ngọc Bích | 21; 10 | 24; 26 | 21; 19 |
| 2 | (Malaysia) (Vietnam) | Leong Jun Hao; Trần Quang Định | 21; 17 | 21; 12 |
| 3 | (Malaysia) (Vietnam) | Eoon Qi Xuan; Trần Thị Phương Thúy | 21; 4 | 23; 21 |
| 4 | (Malaysia) (Vietnam) | Man Wei Chong / Ng Eng Cheong; Lê Thanh Lâm / Nguyễn Hải Đăng | 21; 10 | 21; 18 |
| 5 | (Malaysia) (Vietnam) | Tan Sueh Jeou / Toh Ee Wei; Phạm Ngọc Bích / Trần Thị Phương Thúy | 21; 13 | 21; 14 |

==== Macau vs Myanmar ====
Macau
1
Jaya Raya Sports Hall Training Center, Court 3
23 July 2017, 13:00 UTC+7

Myanmar
4

| | | | 1 | 2 | 3 |
|---|---|---|---|---|---|
| 1 | (Macau) (Myanmar) | Gong Xue Xin / Pui Pang Fong; Aung Myo Htoo / Thet Htar Thuzar | 11; 21 | 14; 21 |
| 2 | (Macau) (Myanmar) | Lam Hou Him; Min Htet Kaung | 21; 5 | 21; 7 |
| 3 | (Macau) (Myanmar) | Wong Cheng Wa; Thet Htar Thuzar | 7; 21 | 9; 21 |
| 4 | (Macau) (Myanmar) | Che Pui Ngai / Pui Pang Fong; Arkar Phone Myat / Hein Si Thu Toe | 14; 21 | 12; 21 |
| 5 | (Macau) (Myanmar) | Ao I Kuan / Gong Xue Xin; Thwe Tar Oo / Lin Let Phyo | 21; 9 | 21; 6 |

==== Vietnam vs Macau ====
Vietnam
4
Jaya Raya Sports Hall Training Center, Court 3
23 July 2017, 17:00 UTC+7

Macau
1

| | | | 1 | 2 | 3 |
|---|---|---|---|---|---|
| 1 | (Vietnam) (Macau) | Trần Thị Phương Thúy; Ao I Kuan | 21; 6 | 21; 11 |
| 2 | (Vietnam) (Macau) | Lê Thanh Lâm; Pui Pang Fong | 18; 21 | 22; 24 |
| 3 | (Vietnam) (Macau) | Phạm Ngọc Bích / Trần Thị Phương Thúy; Ao I Kuan / Gong Xue Xin | 21; 15 | 21; 11 |
| 4 | (Vietnam) (Macau) | Nguyễn Hải Đăng / Vũ Minh Phúc; Che Pui Ngai / Lam Hou Him | 21; 17 | 17; 21 | 21; 18 |
| 5 | (Vietnam) (Macau) | Trần Quang Định / Phạm Ngọc Bích; Gong Xue Xin / Pui Pang Fong | 21; 15 | 21; 19 |

==== Malaysia vs Singapore ====
Malaysia
5
Jaya Raya Sports Hall Training Center, Court 4
23 July 2017, 17:00 UTC+7

Singapore
0

| | | | 1 | 2 | 3 |
|---|---|---|---|---|---|
| 1 | (Malaysia) (Singapore) | Leong Jun Hao / Man Wei Chong; Darrion Michael Ng / Howin Wong | 21; 7 | 21; 11 |
| 2 | (Malaysia) (Singapore) | Goh Jin Wei; Bernice Lim | 21; 9 | 21; 3 |
| 3 | (Malaysia) (Singapore) | Sim Fong Hau; Jethro Tan | 21; 11 | 21; 14 |
| 4 | (Malaysia) (Singapore) | Pearly Tan / Tan Sueh Jeou; Insyirah Khan / Bernice Lim | 21; 12 | 21; 11 |
| 5 | (Malaysia) (Singapore) | Ng Eng Cheong / Toh Ee Wei; Royston Loh / Sito Jia Rong | 21; 10 | 21; 9 |

=== Group C ===
| Pos | Team | Pld | W | L | MF | MA | MD | GF | GA | GD | PF | PA | PD | Pts | Qualification | Japan | Thailand | Philippines | Kazakhstan | Mongolia |
|---|---|---|---|---|---|---|---|---|---|---|---|---|---|---|---|---|---|---|---|---|
| 1 | Japan | 4 | 4 | 0 | 18 | 2 | +16 | 36 | 6 | +30 | 867 | 469 | +398 | 4 | Advance to knockout stage | — | 3–2 | 5–0 | 5–0 | 5–0 |
| 2 | Thailand | 4 | 3 | 1 | 17 | 3 | +14 | 36 | 8 | +28 | 902 | 546 | +356 | 3 | Advance to knockout stage | | — | 5–0 | 5–0 | 5–0 |
| 3 | Philippines | 4 | 2 | 2 | 8 | 12 | −4 | 18 | 24 | −6 | 668 | 653 | +15 | 2 | | | | — | 3–2 | 5–0 |
| 4 | Kazakhstan | 4 | 1 | 3 | 7 | 13 | −6 | 15 | 28 | −13 | 619 | 750 | −131 | 1 | | | | | — | 5–0 |
| 5 | Mongolia | 4 | 0 | 4 | 0 | 20 | −20 | 1 | 40 | −39 | 219 | 857 | −638 | 0 | | | | | | — |

Source: BadmintonCN

==== Thailand vs Philippines ====
Thailand
5
Jaya Raya Sports Hall Training Center, Court 5
22 July 2025, 09:00 UTC+7

Philippines
0

| | | | 1 | 2 | 3 |
|---|---|---|---|---|---|
| 1 | (Thailand) (Philippines) | Wachirawit Sothon / Natthapat Trinkajee; Arthur Salvado / Lanz Zafra | 21; 8 | 21; 9 |
| 2 | (Thailand) (Philippines) | Pattarasuda Chaiwan; Sarah Barredo | 21; 14 | 21; 8 |
| 3 | (Thailand) (Philippines) | Kunlavut Vitidsarn; Solomon Padiz Jr. | 21; 11 | 21; 11 |
| 4 | (Thailand) (Philippines) | Supissara Paewsampran / Jhenicha Sudjaipraparat; Airah Mae Nicole Albo / Alyssa Geverjuan | 16; 21 | 21; 14 | 21; 13 |
| 5 | (Thailand) (Philippines) | Phatharathorn Nipornram / Pattarasuda Chaiwan; Arthur Salvado / Mariya Sevilla | 21; 11 | 21; 13 |

==== Japan vs Mongolia ====
Japan
5
Jaya Raya Sports Hall Training Center, Court 6
22 July 2017, 09:00 UTC+7

Mongolia
0

| | | | 1 | 2 | 3 |
|---|---|---|---|---|---|
| 1 | (Japan) (Mongolia) | Takuma Obayashi / Natsu Saito; Yesun-Erdene Munkhbaatar / Gantsetseg Baatarsuren | 21; 2 | 21; 2 |
| 2 | (Japan) (Mongolia) | Kodai Naraoka; Mendbayar Batsukh | 21; 3 | 21; 5 |
| 3 | (Japan) (Mongolia) | Hirari Mizui; Kherlen Darkhanbaatar | 21; 3 | 21; 1 |
| 4 | (Japan) (Mongolia) | Mahiro Kaneko / Yunosuke Kubota; Mendbayar Batsukh / Yesun-Erdene Munkhbaatar | 21; 0 | 21; 1 |
| 5 | (Japan) (Mongolia) | Yui Suizu / Moe Yamaguchi; Gantsetseg Baatarsuren / Kherlen Darkhanbaatar | 21; 3 | 21; 2 |

==== Kazakhstan vs Philippines ====
Kazakhstan
1
Jaya Raya Sports Hall Training Center, Court 5
22 July 2017, 13:00 UTC+7

Philippines
4

| | | | 1 | 2 | 3 |
|---|---|---|---|---|---|
| 1 | (Kazakhstan) (Philippines) | Ikramzhan Yuldashev / Iya Gordeyeva; Solomon Padiz Jr. / Sarah Barredo | 4; 21 | 10; 21 |
| 2 | (Kazakhstan) (Philippines) | Dmitriy Panarin; Arthur Salvado | 21; 14 | 23; 21 |
| 3 | (Kazakhstan) (Philippines) | Aisha Zhumabek; Airah Mae Nicole Albo | 10; 21 | 9; 21 |
| 4 | (Kazakhstan) (Philippines) | Dmitriy Panarin / Ikramzhan Yuldashev; Solomon Padiz Jr. / Lanz Zafra | 21; 13 | 14; 21 | 25; 23 |
| 5 | (Kazakhstan) (Philippines) | Iya Gordeyeva / Aisha Zhumabek; Alyssa Geverjuan / Mariya Sevilla | 10; 21 | 12; 21 |

==== Japan vs Kazakhstan ====
Japan
5
Jaya Raya Sports Hall Training Center, Court 5
22 July 2017, 17:00 UTC+7

Kazakhstan
0

| | | | 1 | 2 | 3 |
|---|---|---|---|---|---|
| 1 | (Japan) (Kazakhstan) | Yunosuke Kubota / Moe Yamaguchi; Ikramzhan Yuldashev / Aisha Zhumabek | 21; 6 | 21; 12 |
| 2 | (Japan) (Kazakhstan) | Takuma Obayashi; Dmitriy Panarin | 21; 16 | 21; 17 |
| 3 | (Japan) (Kazakhstan) | Yui Suizu; Iya Gordeyeva | 21; 8 | 21; 11 |
| 4 | (Japan) (Kazakhstan) | Hiroki Midorikawa / Hiroki Nakayama; Dmitriy Panarin / Ikramzhan Yuldashev | 21; 11 | 21; 12 |
| 5 | (Japan) (Kazakhstan) | Rin Iwanaga / Natsu Saito; Iya Gordeyeva / Aisha Zhumabek | 21; 6 | 21; 4 |

==== Thailand vs Mongolia ====
Thailand
5
Jaya Raya Sports Hall Training Center, Court 6
22 July 2017, 17:00 UTC+7

Mongolia
0

| | | | 1 | 2 | 3 |
|---|---|---|---|---|---|
| 1 | (Thailand) (Mongolia) | Natthapat Trinkajee / Jhenicha Sudjaipraparat; Yesun-Erdene Munkhbaatar / Gantsetseg Baatarsuren | 21; 1 | 21; 3 |
| 2 | (Thailand) (Mongolia) | Ruttanapak Oupthong; Mendbayar Batsukh | 21; 6 | 21; 9 |
| 3 | (Thailand) (Mongolia) | Chananchida Jucharoen; Kherlen Darkhanbaatar | 21; 3 | 21; 5 |
| 4 | (Thailand) (Mongolia) | Woratat Jianpipatgun / Warit Sarapat; Mendbayar Batsukh / Yesun-Erdene Munkhbaatar | 21; 6 | 21; 9 |
| 5 | (Thailand) (Mongolia) | Benyapa Aimsaard / Nuntakarn Aimsaard; Gantsetseg Baatarsuren / Kherlen Darkhanbaatar | 21; 2 | 21; 2 |

==== Japan vs Philippines ====
Japan
5
Jaya Raya Sports Hall Training Center, Court 5
23 July 2017, 09:00 UTC+7

Philippines
0

| | | | 1 | 2 | 3 |
|---|---|---|---|---|---|
| 1 | (Japan) (Philippines) | Takuma Obayashi / Natsu Saito; Lanz Zafra / Mariya Sevilla | 21; 12 | 21; 7 |
| 2 | (Japan) (Philippines) | Kodai Naraoka; Solomon Padiz Jr. | 21; 10 | 21; 4 |
| 3 | (Japan) (Philippines) | Mahiro Kaneko / Yunosuke Kubota; Arthur Salvado / Lanz Zafra | 21; 7 | 21; 11 |
| 4 | (Japan) (Philippines) | Hirari Mizui; Sarah Barredo | 21; 16 | 21; 15 |
| 5 | (Japan) (Philippines) | Rin Iwanaga / Natsu Saito; Airah Mae Nicole Albo / Alyssa Geverjuan | 21; 10 | 21; 15 |

==== Thailand vs Kazakhstan ====
Thailand
5
Jaya Raya Sports Hall Training Center, Court 6
23 July 2017, 09:00 UTC+7

Kazakhstan
0

| | | | 1 | 2 | 3 |
|---|---|---|---|---|---|
| 1 | (Thailand) (Kazakhstan) | Ruttanapak Oupthong / Sararat Chueboca; Ikramzhan Yuldashev / Aisha Zhumabek | 21; 7 | 21; 4 |
| 2 | (Thailand) (Kazakhstan) | Saran Jamsri; Dmitriy Panarin | 21; 15 | 21; 17 |
| 3 | (Thailand) (Kazakhstan) | Chananchida Jucharoen; Iya Gordeyeva | 21; 9 | 21; 3 |
| 4 | (Thailand) (Kazakhstan) | Woratat Jianpipatgun / Warit Sarapat; Dmitriy Panarin / Ikramzhan Yuldashev | 19; 21 | 21; 12 | 21; 13 |
| 5 | (Thailand) (Kazakhstan) | Sararat Chueboca / Thunyathorn Thamnopakao; Iya Gordeyeva / Aisha Zhumabek | 21; 12 | 21; 17 |

==== Mongolia vs Philippines ====
Mongolia
0
Jaya Raya Sports Hall Training Center, Court 5
23 July 2017, 13:00 UTC+7

Philippines
5

| | | | 1 | 2 | 3 |
|---|---|---|---|---|---|
| 1 | (Mongolia) (Philippines) | Yesun-Erdene Munkhbaatar / Gantsetseg Baatarsuren; Solomon Padiz Jr. / Sarah Barredo | 3; 21 | 4; 21 |
| 2 | (Mongolia) (Philippines) | Mendbayar Batsukh; Lanz Zafra | 7; 21 | 1; 21 |
| 3 | (Mongolia) (Philippines) | Kherlen Darkhanbaatar; Mariya Sevilla | 9; 21 | 7; 21 |
| 4 | (Mongolia) (Philippines) | Mendbayar Batsukh / Yesun-Erdene Munkhbaatar; Solomon Padiz Jr. / Arthur Salvado | 9; 21 | 6; 21 |
| 5 | (Mongolia) (Philippines) | Gantsetseg Baatarsuren / Kherlen Darkhanbaatar; Airah Mae Nicole Albo / Alyssa Geverjuan | 5; 21 | 7; 21 |

==== Kazakhstan vs Mongolia ====
Kazakhstan
5
Jaya Raya Sports Hall Training Center, Court 5
23 July 2017, 17:00 UTC+7

Mongolia
0

| | | | 1 | 2 | 3 |
|---|---|---|---|---|---|
| 1 | (Kazakhstan) (Mongolia) | Ikramzhan Yuldashev / Iya Gordeyeva; Yesun-Erdene Munkhbaatar / Gantsetseg Baatarsuren | 21; 7 | 21; 2 |
| 2 | (Kazakhstan) (Mongolia) | Dmitriy Panarin; Mendbayar Batsukh | 21; 3 | 21; 5 |
| 3 | (Kazakhstan) (Mongolia) | Aisha Zhumabek; Kherlen Darkhanbaatar | 21; 7 | 17; 21 | 21; 12 |
| 4 | (Kazakhstan) (Mongolia) | Dmitriy Panarin / Ikramzhan Yuldashev; Mendbayar Batsukh / Yesun-Erdene Munkhbaatar | 21; 6 | 21; 0 |
| 5 | (Kazakhstan) (Mongolia) | Iya Gordeyeva / Aisha Zhumabek; Gantsetseg Baatarsuren / Kherlen Darkhanbaatar | 21; 19 | 21; 11 |

==== Thailand vs Japan ====
Thailand
2
Jaya Raya Sports Hall Training Center, Court 6
23 July 2017, 17:00 UTC+7

Japan
3

| | | | 1 | 2 | 3 |
|---|---|---|---|---|---|
| 1 | (Thailand) (Japan) | Natthapat Trinkajee / Jhenicha Sudjaipraparat; Takuma Obayashi / Natsu Saito | 15; 21 | 23; 21 | 16; 21 |
| 2 | (Thailand) (Japan) | Kunlavut Vitidsarn; Kodai Naraoka | 21; 13 | 21; 23 | 19; 21 |
| 3 | (Thailand) (Japan) | Wachirawit Sothon / Natthapat Trinkajee; Mahiro Kaneko / Yunosuke Kubota | 17; 21 | 18; 21 |
| 4 | (Thailand) (Japan) | Pattarasuda Chaiwan; Hirari Mizui | 21; 17 | 24; 22 |
| 5 | (Thailand) (Japan) | Benyapa Aimsaard / Nuntakarn Aimsaard; Rin Iwanaga / Natsu Saito | 21; 17 | 21; 19 |

=== Group D ===
| Pos | Team | Pld | W | L | MF | MA | MD | GF | GA | GD | PF | PA | PD | Pts | Qualification | Indonesia | Chinese Taipei for Olympic games | Hong Kong | Nepal |
|---|---|---|---|---|---|---|---|---|---|---|---|---|---|---|---|---|---|---|---|
| 1 | Indonesia (H) | 3 | 3 | 0 | 13 | 2 | +11 | 27 | 4 | +23 | 615 | 410 | +205 | 3 | Advance to knockout stage | — | 3–2 | 5–0 | 5–0 |
| 2 | Chinese Taipei | 3 | 2 | 1 | 11 | 4 | +7 | 22 | 12 | +10 | 650 | 488 | +162 | 2 | Advance to knockout stage | | — | 4–1 | 5–0 |
| 3 | Hong Kong | 3 | 1 | 2 | 6 | 9 | −3 | 15 | 18 | −3 | 575 | 545 | +30 | 1 | | | | — | 5–0 |
| 4 | Nepal | 3 | 0 | 3 | 0 | 15 | −15 | 0 | 30 | −30 | 233 | 630 | −397 | 0 | | | | | — |

Source: BadmintonCN
(H) Host

==== Indonesia vs Nepal ====
Indonesia
5
Jaya Raya Sports Hall Training Center, Court 1
22 July 2017, 13:00 UTC+7

Nepal
0

| | | | 1 | 2 | 3 |
|---|---|---|---|---|---|
| 1 | (Indonesia) (Nepal) | Gatjra Piliang Fiqihilahi Cupu; Praful Maharjan | 21; 8 | 21; 9 |
| 2 | (Indonesia) (Nepal) | Aurum Oktavia Winata; Rasila Maharjan | 21; 7 | 21; 6 |
| 3 | (Indonesia) (Nepal) | Muhammad Shohibul Fikri / Adnan Maulana; Praful Maharjan / Rukesh Maharjan | 21; 5 | 21; 4 |
| 4 | (Indonesia) (Nepal) | Jauza Fadhila Sugiarto / Ribka Sugiarto; Jessica Gurung / Rasila Maharjan | 21; 7 | 21; 5 |
| 5 | (Indonesia) (Nepal) | Rinov Rivaldy / Angelica Wiratama; Pabin Kumar Lingthen / Sunayana Mukhiya | 21; 9 | 21; 10 |

==== Chinese Taipei vs Hong Kong ====
Chinese Taipei
4
Jaya Raya Sports Hall Training Center, Court 2
22 July 2017, 13:00 UTC+7

Hong Kong
1

| | | | 1 | 2 | 3 |
|---|---|---|---|---|---|
| 1 | (Chinese Taipei) (Hong Kong) | Hsieh Yu-ying; Yeung Sum Yee | 12; 21 | 21; 15 | 21; 14 |
| 2 | (Chinese Taipei) (Hong Kong) | Lee Chia-hao; Chan Yin Chak | 18; 21 | 21; 8 | 21; 15 |
| 3 | (Chinese Taipei) (Hong Kong) | Li Zi-qing / Teng Chun-hsun; Leung Yuet Yee / Yeung Pui Lam | 21; 17 | 20; 22 | 21; 18 |
| 4 | (Chinese Taipei) (Hong Kong) | Su Li-wei / Ye Hong-wei; Ko Shing Hei / Lui Chun Wai | 21; 14 | 21; 15 |
| 5 | (Chinese Taipei) (Hong Kong) | Hung En-tzu / Lu Chen; Chan Yin Chak / Yeung Pui Lam | 11; 21 | 14; 21 |

==== Indonesia vs Hong Kong ====
Indonesia
5
Jaya Raya Sports Hall Training Center, Court 1
23 July 2017, 09:00 UTC+7

Hong Kong
0

| | | | 1 | 2 | 3 |
|---|---|---|---|---|---|
| 1 | (Indonesia) (Hong Kong) | Rinov Rivaldy / Angelica Wiratama; Lui Chun Wai / Yeung Pui Lam | 21; 10 | 21; 15 |
| 2 | (Indonesia) (Hong Kong) | Gatjra Piliang Fiqihilahi Cupu; Chan Yin Chak | 21; 14 | 21; 18 |
| 3 | (Indonesia) (Hong Kong) | Muhammad Shohibul Fikri / Adnan Maulana; Chow Hin Long / Lee Chun Lai | 21; 10 | 21; 17 |
| 4 | (Indonesia) (Hong Kong) | Gregoria Mariska Tunjung; Yeung Sum Yee | 21; 16 | 21; 12 |
| 5 | (Indonesia) (Hong Kong) | Agatha Imanuela / Siti Fadia Silva Ramadhanti; Leung Yuet Yee / Yeung Pui Lam | 21; 16 | 21; 15 |

==== Chinese Taipei vs Nepal ====
Chinese Taipei
5
Jaya Raya Sports Hall Training Center, Court 2
23 July 2017, 09:00 UTC+7

Nepal
0

| | | | 1 | 2 | 3 |
|---|---|---|---|---|---|
| 1 | (Chinese Taipei) (Nepal) | Chen Shiau-cheng; Praful Maharjan | 21; 5 | 21; 6 |
| 2 | (Chinese Taipei) (Nepal) | Huang Yin-hsuan; Rasila Maharjan | 21; 5 | 21; 7 |
| 3 | (Chinese Taipei) (Nepal) | Lu Chen / Su Po-wei; Praful Maharjan / Rukesh Maharjan | 21; 10 | 21; 6 |
| 4 | (Chinese Taipei) (Nepal) | Chang Yen-ting / Tseng Yu-chi; Jessica Gurung / Rasila Maharjan | 21; 7 | 21; 6 |
| 5 | (Chinese Taipei) (Nepal) | Lin Chun-yi / Lin Sih-yun; Pabin Kumar Lingthen / Sunayana Mukhiya | 21; 12 | 21; 7 |

==== Indonesia vs Chinese Taipei ====
Indonesia
3
Jaya Raya Sports Hall Training Center, Court 1
23 July 2017, 17:00 UTC+7

Chinese Taipei
2

| | | | 1 | 2 | 3 |
|---|---|---|---|---|---|
| 1 | (Indonesia) (Chinese Taipei) | Muhammad Shohibul Fikri / Adnan Maulana; Lu Chen / Su Li-wei | 21; 11 | 24; 22 |
| 2 | (Indonesia) (Chinese Taipei) | Gregoria Mariska Tunjung; Hung En-tzu | 21; 12 | 21; 19 |
| 3 | (Indonesia) (Chinese Taipei) | Ikhsan Rumbay; Chen Chi-ting | 21; 18 | 7; 21 | 8; 21 |
| 4 | (Indonesia) (Chinese Taipei) | Jauza Fadhila Sugiarto / Ribka Sugiarto; Li Zi-qing / Teng Chun-hsun | 19; 21 | 11; 21 |
| 5 | (Indonesia) (Chinese Taipei) | Rinov Rivaldy / Siti Fadia Silva Ramadhanti; Ye Hong-wei / Chang Yen-ting | 21; 19 | 21; 12 |

==== Hong Kong vs Nepal ====
Hong Kong
5
Jaya Raya Sports Hall Training Center, Court 2
23 July 2017, 17:00 UTC+7

Nepal
0

| | | | 1 | 2 | 3 |
|---|---|---|---|---|---|
| 1 | (Hong Kong) (Nepal) | Chow Hin Long; Praful Maharjan | 21; 8 | 21; 16 |
| 2 | (Hong Kong) (Nepal) | Wong Ching Chi; Rasila Maharjan | 21; 7 | 21; 6 |
| 3 | (Hong Kong) (Nepal) | Chan Yau Wai / Mak Pak Ngai; Praful Maharjan / Rukesh Maharjan | 21; 8 | 21; 6 |
| 4 | (Hong Kong) (Nepal) | Leung Sze Lok / Wong Hiu Ching; Jessica Gurung / Rasila Maharjan | 21; 14 | 21; 12 |
| 5 | (Hong Kong) (Nepal) | Ko Shing Hei / Yeung Sum Yee; Pabin Kumar Lingthen / Sunayana Mukhiya | 21; 7 | 21; 8 |

== Knockout stage ==
=== Bracket ===
Quarter-finals
24 July
South Korea | 3
Thailand | 1
24 July
Japan | 3
China | 0
24 July
South Korea | 1
Malaysia | 3
24 July
Singapore | 1
Indonesia | 3

Semi-finals
24 July
South Korea | 3
Japan | 1
24 July
Malaysia | 1
Indonesia | 3

Final
25 July
South Korea | 3
Indonesia | 2

=== Quarter-finals ===
==== South Korea vs Thailand ====
South Korea
3
Jaya Raya Sports Hall Training Center, Court 1
24 July 2017, 10:00 UTC+7

Thailand
1

| | | | 1 | 2 | 3 |
|---|---|---|---|---|---|---|
| 1 | (South Korea) (Thailand) | Kang Min-hyuk / Kim Moon-jun; Wachirawit Sothon / Natthapat Trinkajee | 21; 16 | 22; 20 |
| 2 | (South Korea) (Thailand) | Sim Yu-jin; Pattarasuda Chaiwan | 21; 13 | 14; 21 | 9; 21 |
| 3 | (South Korea) (Thailand) | Woo Seung-hoon; Phatharathorn Nipornram | 21; 15 | 19; 21 | 21; 15 |
| 4 | (South Korea) (Thailand) | Baek Ha-na / Lee Yu-lim; Benyapa Aimsaard / Nuntakarn Aimsaard | 21; 16 | 21; 11 |
| 5 | (South Korea) (Thailand) | Na Sung-seung / Seong Ah-yeong; Ruttanapak Oupthong / Jhenicha Sudjaipraparat | | | | not played |

==== Japan vs China ====
Japan
3
Jaya Raya Sports Hall Training Center, Court 2
24 July 2017, 10:00 UTC+7

China
0

| | | | 1 | 2 | 3 |
|---|---|---|---|---|---|---|
| 1 | (Japan) (China) | Takuma Obayashi / Natsu Saito; Di Zijian / Li Wenmei | 21; 16 | 19; 21 | 22; 20 |
| 2 | (Japan) (China) | Kodai Naraoka; Gao Zhengze | 22; 20 | 21; 6 |
| 3 | (Japan) (China) | Mahiro Kaneko / Yunosuke Kubota; Chen Sihang / Fan Qiuyue | 21; 16 | 20; 22 | 24; 22 |
| 4 | (Japan) (China) | Hirari Mizui; Han Yue | | | | not played |
| 5 | (Japan) (China) | Rin Iwanaga / Natsu Saito; Li Wenmei / Zhou Meng | | | | not played |

==== Chinese Taipei vs Malaysia ====
Chinese Taipei
1
Jaya Raya Sports Hall Training Center, Court 3
24 July 2017, 10:00 UTC+7

Malaysia
3

| | | | 1 | 2 | 3 |
|---|---|---|---|---|---|---|
| 1 | (Chinese Taipei) (Malaysia) | Lu Chen / Su Li-wei; Chang Yee Jun / Ng Eng Cheong | 21; 17 | 19; 21 | 20; 22 |
| 2 | (Chinese Taipei) (Malaysia) | Hsieh Yu-ying; Goh Jin Wei | 14; 21 | 11; 21 |
| 3 | (Chinese Taipei) (Malaysia) | Lee Chia-hao; Leong Jun Hao | 21; 12 | 21; 19 |
| 4 | (Chinese Taipei) (Malaysia) | Li Zi-qing / Teng Chun-hsun; Goh Jin Wei / Pearly Tan | 15; 21 | 19; 21 |
| 5 | (Chinese Taipei) (Malaysia) | Chang Yen-ting / Ye Hong-wei; Ng Eng Cheong / Toh Ee Wei | | | | not played |

==== Singapore vs Indonesia ====
Singapore
0
Jaya Raya Sports Hall Training Center, Court 4
24 July 2017, 10:00 UTC+7

Indonesia
3

| | | | 1 | 2 | 3 |
|---|---|---|---|---|---|---|
| 1 | (Singapore) (Indonesia) | Joel Koh; Gatjra Piliang Fiqihilahi Cupu | 21; 12 | 10; 21 | 15; 21 |
| 2 | (Singapore) (Indonesia) | Insyirah Khan; Gregoria Mariska Tunjung | 4; 21 | 14; 21 |
| 3 | (Singapore) (Indonesia) | Abel Tan / Toh Han Zhuo; Muhammad Shohibul Fikri / Adnan Maulana | 14; 21 | 16; 21 |
| 4 | (Singapore) (Indonesia) | Bernice Lim / Sito Jia Rong; Agatha Imanuela / Ribka Sugiarto |
| 5 | (Singapore) (Indonesia) | Toh Han Zhuo / Insyirah Khan; Rinov Rivaldy / Siti Fadia Silva Ramadhanti | | | | not played |

=== Semi-finals ===
==== South Korea vs Japan ====
South Korea
3
Jaya Raya Sports Hall Training Center, Court 1
24 July 2017, 16:00 UTC+7

Japan
1

| | | | 1 | 2 | 3 |
|---|---|---|---|---|---|---|
| 1 | (South Korea) (Japan) | Na Sung-seung / Seong Ah-yeong; Takuma Obayashi / Natsu Saito | 21; 13 | 21; 16 |
| 2 | (South Korea) (Japan) | Woo Seung-hoon; Kodai Naraoka | 21; 7 | 21; 19 |
| 3 | (South Korea) (Japan) | Kang Min-hyuk / Kim Moon-jun; Mahiro Kaneko / Yunosuke Kubota | 23; 21 | 15; 21 | 17; 21 |
| 4 | (South Korea) (Japan) | Park Ga-eun; Hirari Mizui | 21; 15 | 21; 13 |
| 5 | (South Korea) (Japan) | Kim Min-ji / Lee Yu-lim; Rin Iwanaga / Natsu Saito | | | | not played |

==== Malaysia vs Indonesia ====
Malaysia
1
Jaya Raya Sports Hall Training Center, Court 2
24 July 2017, 16:00 UTC+7

Indonesia
3

| | | | 1 | 2 | 3 |
|---|---|---|---|---|---|---|
| 1 | (Malaysia) (Indonesia) | Goh Jin Wei; Gregoria Mariska Tunjung | 11; 21 | 16; 17 | | retired |
| 2 | (Malaysia) (Indonesia) | Leong Jun Hao; Gatjra Piliang Fiqihilahi Cupu | 21; 17 | 21; 12 |
| 3 | (Malaysia) (Indonesia) | Goh Jin Wei / Pearly Tan; Agatha Imanuela / Siti Fadia Silva Ramadhanti | | | | w/o |
| 4 | (Malaysia) (Indonesia) | Chang Yee Jun / Man Wei Chong; Muhammad Shohibul Fikri / Adnan Maulana | 17; 21 | 15; 21 |
| 5 | (Malaysia) (Indonesia) | Ng Eng Cheong / Toh Ee Wei; Siti Fadia Silva Ramadhanti / Rinov Rivaldy | | | | not played |

=== Final ===
==== South Korea vs Indonesia ====
South Korea
3
Jaya Raya Sports Hall Training Center, Court 1
25 July 2017, 10:00 UTC+7

Indonesia
2

| | | | 1 | 2 | 3 |
|---|---|---|---|---|---|
| 1 | (South Korea) (Indonesia) | Na Sung-seung / Seong Ah-yeong; Rinov Rivaldy / Siti Fadia Silva Ramadhanti | 19; 21 | 21; 18 | 21; 23 |
| 2 | (South Korea) (Indonesia) | Woo Seung-hoon; Ikhsan Rumbay | 22; 24 | 21; 10 | 21; 8 |
| 3 | (South Korea) (Indonesia) | Kang Min-hyuk / Kim Moon-jun; Muhammad Shohibul Fikri / Adnan Maulana | 21; 18 | 19; 21 | 16; 21 |
| 4 | (South Korea) (Indonesia) | An Se-young; Gregoria Mariska Tunjung | 21; 19 | 7; 21 | 22; 20 |
| 5 | (South Korea) (Indonesia) | Kim Min-ji / Lee Yu-lim; Agatha Imanuela / Siti Fadia Silva Ramadhanti | 21; 19 | 21; 13 |
