= Tsang Hiu Yan =

Hong Kong badminton player (born 2002)

Tsang Hiu Yan 曾曉昕
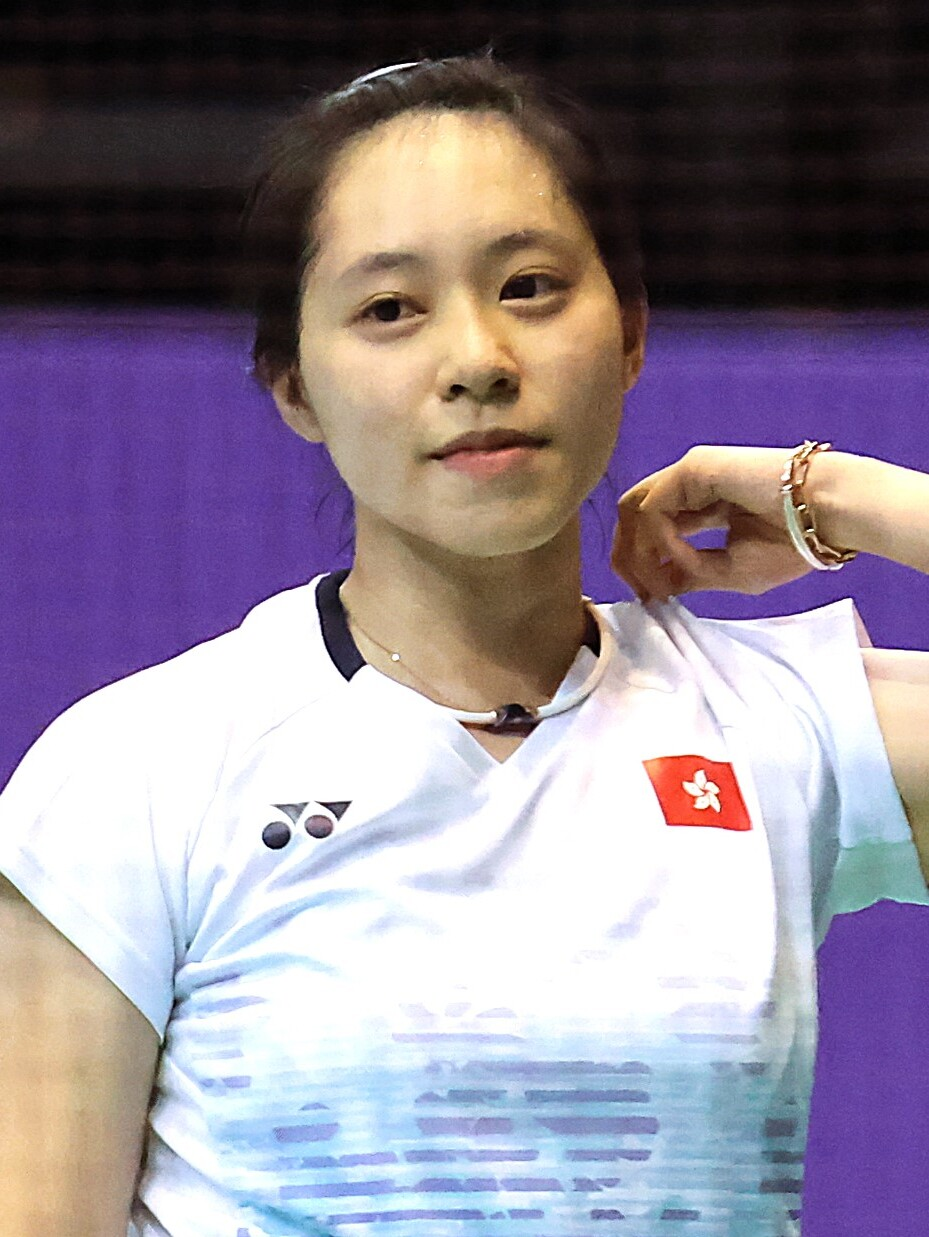
- Tsang at the 2023 Kaohsiung Masters

Personal information
- Born: 22 February 2002 (age 24) Hong Kong

Sport
- Country: Hong Kong
- Sport: Badminton

Women's & mixed doubles
- Highest ranking: 24 (WD with Lui Lok Lok, 22 September 2025); 32 (WD with Ng Tsz Yau, 21 March 2023); 98 (XD with Hung Kuei Chun, 15 April 2025)
- Current ranking: 33 (WD with Lui Lok Lok, 3 November 2026)
- BWF profile

Tsang Hiu Yan
- Traditional Chinese: 曾曉昕
- Simplified Chinese: 曾晓昕
Transcriptions
Standard Mandarin
- Hanyu Pinyin: Zēng Xiǎoxīn
Yue: Cantonese
- Jyutping: cang4 hiu2 jan1

Tsang Hiu Yan (Chinese: 曾曉昕; born 22 February 2002) is a Hong Kong badminton player.

== Career ==
In 2022, she participated in the Taipei Open and won the women's doubles title partnered with Ng Tsz Yau.

== Achievements ==
=== BWF World Tour (1 title) ===
The BWF World Tour, which was announced on 19 March 2017 and implemented in 2018, is a series of elite badminton tournaments sanctioned by the Badminton World Federation (BWF). The BWF World Tour is divided into levels of World Tour Finals, Super 1000, Super 750, Super 500, Super 300, and the BWF Tour Super 100.

Women's doubles
| Year | Tournament | Level | Partner | Opponent | Score | Result |
|---|---|---|---|---|---|---|
| 2022 | Taipei Open | Super 300 | (Hong Kong) Ng Tsz Yau | (Japan) Rui Hirokami (Japan) Yuna Kato | 21–15, 18–21, 21–19 | (gold) Winner |

=== BWF International Challenge/Series (1 title, 2 runners-up) ===
Women's doubles
| Year | Tournament | Partner | Opponent | Score | Result |
|---|---|---|---|---|---|
| 2021 | Bahrain International Series | (Hong Kong) Ng Tsz Yau | (Hong Kong) Yeung Nga Ting (Hong Kong) Yeung Pui Lam | 13–21, 18–21 | (silver) Runner-up |
| 2021 | Bahrain International Challenge | (Hong Kong) Ng Tsz Yau | (Hong Kong) Yeung Nga Ting (Hong Kong) Yeung Pui Lam | 12–21, 18–21 | (silver) Runner-up |
| 2022 | Dutch International | (Hong Kong) Ng Tsz Yau | (Hong Kong) Yeung Nga Ting (Hong Kong) Yeung Pui Lam | 22–20, 14–21, 23–21 | (gold) Winner |

BWF International Challenge tournament
BWF International Series tournament
