= 2016 Badminton Asia Junior Championships – Teams event =

Badminton championship in Bangkok, Thailand

Teams event at the 2016 Badminton Asia Junior Championships
- Venue: CPB Badminton and Sports Science Training Center
- Location: Bangkok, Thailand
- Dates: 9–12 July 2016

The team tournament at the 2016 Badminton Asia Junior Championships took place from 9 to 12 July 2016 at the CPB Badminton and Sports Science Training Center in Bangkok, Thailand. A total of 16 countries competed in this event.

== Group stage ==
=== Group A ===
Pos	Team	Pld	W	L	MF	MA	MD	GF	GA	GD	PF	PA	PD	Pts	Qualification	People's Republic of China	South Korea	Singapore	Kazakhstan
1	China	3	3	0	15	0	+15	30	3	+27	682	378	+304	3	Advance to knockout stage	—	5–0	5–0	5–0
2	South Korea	3	2	1	9	6	+3	20	12	+8	567	471	+96	2	Advance to knockout stage		—	4–1	5–0
3	Singapore	3	1	2	5	10	−5	13	21	−8	572	632	−60	1				—	4–1
4	Kazakhstan	3	0	3	1	14	−13	2	29	−27	309	649	−340	0					—

Source: BadmintonCN

==== China vs Kazakhstan ====
China
5
CPB Badminton and Sports Science Training Center, Court 1
9 July 2016, 10:00 UTC+7

Kazakhstan
0

			1	2	3
1	(China) (Kazakhstan)	Zhu Junhao / Zhou Chaomin; Ikramzhan Yuldashev / Iya Gordeyeva	21; 4	21; 7
2	(China) (Kazakhstan)	Sun Feixiang; Dmitriy Panarin	21; 13	21; 7
3	(China) (Kazakhstan)	Chen Yufei; Yelizaveta Kharchenko	21; 7	21; 7
4	(China) (Kazakhstan)	He Jiting / Tan Qiang; Dmitriy Panarin / Ikramzhan Yuldashev	21; 3	21; 7
5	(China) (Kazakhstan)	An Yu / Xu Ya; Iya Gordeyeva / Yelizaveta Kharchenko	21; 9	21; 4

==== South Korea vs Singapore ====
South Korea
4
CPB Badminton and Sports Science Training Center, Court 2
9 July 2023, 10:00 UTC+7

Singapore
1

			1	2	3
1	(South Korea) (Singapore)	Kim Won-ho / Lee Yu-lim; Andy Kwek / Crystal Wong	21; 18	21; 10
2	(South Korea) (Singapore)	Kim Moon-jun; Ryan Ng	22; 20	20; 22	14; 21
3	(South Korea) (Singapore)	Kim Ga-eun; Yeo Jia Min	21; 8	21; 12
4	(South Korea) (Singapore)	Kang Min-hyuk / Na Sung-seung; Andy Kwek / Lee Jian Liang	21; 16	21; 17
5	(South Korea) (Singapore)	Kim Ga-eun / Kim Hyang-im; Ker'sara Koh / Crystal Wong	21; 9	21; 13

==== China vs Singapore ====
China
5
CPB Badminton and Sports Science Training Center, Court 3
9 July 2016, 17:00 UTC+7

Singapore
0

			1	2	3
1	(China) (Singapore)	He Jiting / Du Yue; Andy Kwek / Crystal Wong	21; 16	21; 16
2	(China) (Singapore)	Liu Haichao; Ryan Ng	21; 19	19; 21	21; 12
3	(China) (Singapore)	Han Chengkai / Zhou Haodong; Chuang Jin Lei / Lee Jian Liang	21; 11	21; 7
4	(China) (Singapore)	Gao Fangjie; Yeo Jia Min	21; 11	14; 21	21; 18
5	(China) (Singapore)	Hu Yuxiang / Xu Ya; Ker'sara Koh / Crystal Wong	21; 17	21; 9

==== South Korea vs Kazakhstan ====
South Korea
5
CPB Badminton and Sports Science Training Center, Court 4
9 July 2016, 17:00 UTC+7

Kazakhstan
0

			1	2	3
1	(South Korea) (Kazakhstan)	Kim Won-ho / Park Ga-eun; Dmitriy Panarin / Yelizaveta Kharchenko	21; 10	21; 7
2	(South Korea) (Kazakhstan)	Byun Jung-soo; Ikramzhan Yuldashev	21; 8	21; 4
3	(South Korea) (Kazakhstan)	Baek Ha-na; Iya Gordeyeva	21; 6	21; 8
4	(South Korea) (Kazakhstan)	Lee Hak-beom / Lee Sang-min; Dmitriy Panarin / Ikramzhan Yuldashev	21; 6	22; 20
5	(South Korea) (Kazakhstan)	Kim Min-ji / Lee Ye-na; Iya Gordeyeva / Yelizaveta Kharchenko	21; 5	21; 2

==== Singapore vs Kazakhstan ====
Singapore
4
CPB Badminton and Sports Science Training Center, Court 5
10 July 2016, 10:00 UTC+7

Kazakhstan
1

			1	2	3
1	(Singapore) (Kazakhstan)	Lee Jian Liang / Ker'sara Koh; Iya Gordeyeva / Ikramzhan Yuldashev	21; 17	21; 15
2	(Singapore) (Kazakhstan)	Chuang Jin Lei; Dmitriy Panarin	21; 15	17; 21	17; 21
3	(Singapore) (Kazakhstan)	Insyirah Khan; Yelizaveta Kharchenko	21; 12	21; 6
4	(Singapore) (Kazakhstan)	Elaf Tan / Toh Han Zhuo; Dmitriy Panarin / Ikramzhan Yuldashev	26; 24	21; 15
5	(Singapore) (Kazakhstan)	Sito Jia Rong / Crystal Wong; Iya Gordeyeva / Yelizaveta Kharchenko	21; 5	21; 14

==== China vs South Korea ====
China
5
CPB Badminton and Sports Science Training Center, Court 3
10 July 2016, 17:00 UTC+7

South Korea
0

			1	2	3
1	(China) (South Korea)	Han Chengkai / Zhou Haodong; Lee Sang-min / Na Sung-seung	21; 9	21; 15
2	(China) (South Korea)	Chen Yufei; Byun Soo-in	21; 14	21; 13
3	(China) (South Korea)	Sun Feixiang; Park Chan-ik	21; 5	21; 6
4	(China) (South Korea)	Hu Yuxiang / Xu Ya; Kim Min-ji / Lee Ye-na	21; 12	19; 21	21; 16
5	(China) (South Korea)	He Jiting / Du Yue; Lee Hak-beom / Park Ga-eun	21; 12	21; 9

=== Group B ===
Pos	Team	Pld	W	L	MF	MA	MD	GF	GA	GD	PF	PA	PD	Pts	Qualification	Japan	Hong Kong	Macau	Sri Lanka
1	Japan	3	3	0	14	1	+13	28	2	+26	627	320	+307	3	Advance to knockout stage	—	4–1	5–0	5–0
2	Hong Kong	3	2	1	11	4	+7	22	8	+14	577	403	+174	2	Advance to knockout stage		—	5–0	5–0
3	Macau	3	1	2	3	12	−9	6	26	−20	403	654	−251	1				—	3–2
4	Sri Lanka	3	0	3	2	13	−11	6	26	−20	391	621	−230	0					—

Source: BadmintonCN

==== Japan vs Sri Lanka ====
Japan
5
CPB Badminton and Sports Science Training Center, Court 3
9 July 2016, 10:00 UTC+7

Sri Lanka
0

			1	2	3
1	(Japan) (Sri Lanka)	Kyohei Yamashita; Ranthushka Karunathilaka	21; 9	21; 11
2	(Japan) (Sri Lanka)	Shiori Ebihara; Dilmi Dias	21; 4	21; 5
3	(Japan) (Sri Lanka)	Mahiro Kaneko / Yunosuke Kubota; Kasun Amarasena / Ranthushka Karunathilaka	21; 5	21; 8
4	(Japan) (Sri Lanka)	Minami Kawashima / Natsumi Uesugi; Buthmi Galagamage / Thanushi Ratnayaka	21; 6	21; 8
5	(Japan) (Sri Lanka)	Natsuki Sone / Naoki Yamazawa; Kasun Amarasena / Dilmi Dias	21; 4	21; 15

==== Hong Kong vs Macau ====
Hong Kong
5
CPB Badminton and Sports Science Training Center, Court 4
9 July 2016, 10:00 UTC+7

Macau
0

			1	2	3
1	(Hong Kong) (Macau)	Leung Sze Lok / Lui Chun Wai; Che Pui Ngai / Ng Weng Chi	21; 11	24; 22
2	(Hong Kong) (Macau)	Chan Yin Chak; Pui Pang Fong	21; 5	21; 9
3	(Hong Kong) (Macau)	Chow Hin Long / Lam Wai Lok; Ao Fei Long / Lam Hou Him	21; 6	21; 16
4	(Hong Kong) (Macau)	Yeung Sum Yee; Ao I Kuan	21; 9	21; 11
5	(Hong Kong) (Macau)	Yau Mau Ying / Yeung Nga Ting; Gong Xue Xin / Ng Weng Chi	21; 16	21; 6

==== Japan vs Macau ====
Japan
5
CPB Badminton and Sports Science Training Center, Court 5
9 July 2016, 17:00 UTC+7

Macau
0

			1	2	3
1	(Japan) (Macau)	Mahiro Kaneko / Minami Kawashima; Gong Xue Xin / Pui Pang Fong	21; 9	21; 13
2	(Japan) (Macau)	Takuma Obayashi; Lam Hou Him	21; 11	21; 11
3	(Japan) (Macau)	Kyohei Yamashita / Naoki Yamazawa; Che Pui Ngai / Pui Pang Fong	21; 11	21; 7
4	(Japan) (Macau)	Asuka Takahashi; Ng Weng Chi	21; 7	21; 9
5	(Japan) (Macau)	Sayaka Hobara / Nami Matsuyama; Ao I Kuan / Gong Xue Xin	21; 6	21; 7

==== Hong Kong vs Sri Lanka ====
Hong Kong
5
CPB Badminton and Sports Science Training Center, Court 6
9 July 2016, 17:00 UTC+7

Sri Lanka
0

			1	2	3
1	(Hong Kong) (Sri Lanka)	Chan Yin Chak / Ng Tsz Yau; Madhuka Dulanjana / Buthmi Galagamage	21; 7	21; 5
2	(Hong Kong) (Sri Lanka)	Yeung Sum Yee; Dilmi Dias	21; 8	21; 9
3	(Hong Kong) (Sri Lanka)	Chan Yin Chak; Ranthushka Karunathilaka	21; 10	21; 11
4	(Hong Kong) (Sri Lanka)	Ng Tsz Yau / Yeung Nga Ting; Kavishka Gunarathne / Hasara Wijayarathne	21; 9	21; 7
5	(Hong Kong) (Sri Lanka)	Chow Hin Long / Lam Wai Lok; Kasun Amarasena / Ranthushka Karunathilaka	21; 10	21; 9

==== Macau vs Sri Lanka ====
Macau
3
CPB Badminton and Sports Science Training Center, Court 6
10 July 2016, 10:00 UTC+7

Sri Lanka
2

			1	2	3
1	(Macau) (Sri Lanka)	Che Pui Ngai / Gong Xue Xin; Kasun Amarasena / Dilmi Dias	17; 21	21; 17	21; 19
2	(Macau) (Sri Lanka)	Pui Pang Fong; Ranthushka Karunathilaka	21; 15	15; 21	21; 16
3	(Macau) (Sri Lanka)	Ao I Kuan; Dilmi Dias	11; 21	10; 21
4	(Macau) (Sri Lanka)	Che Pui Ngai / Lam Hou Him; Kasun Amarasena / Ranthushka Karunathilaka	13; 21	7; 21
5	(Macau) (Sri Lanka)	Gong Xue Xin / Ng Weng Chi; Buthmi Galagamage / Thanushi Ratnayaka	23; 21	21; 17

==== Japan vs Hong Kong ====
Japan
4
CPB Badminton and Sports Science Training Center, Court 4
10 July 2016, 17:00 UTC+7

Hong Kong
1

			1	2	3
1	(Japan) (Hong Kong)	Hiroki Okamura / Masayuki Onodera; Kwok Chun Him / Lui Chun Wai	21; 9	21; 9
2	(Japan) (Hong Kong)	Natsuki Nidaira; Yeung Sum Yee	21; 9	21; 16
3	(Japan) (Hong Kong)	Koki Watanabe; Chan Yin Chak	23; 21	21; 16
4	(Japan) (Hong Kong)	Sayaka Hobara / Nami Matsuyama; Ng Tsz Yau / Yeung Nga Ting	19; 21	18; 21
5	(Japan) (Hong Kong)	Naoki Yamazawa / Natsuki Sone; Ko Shing Hei / Yeung Pui Lam	21; 13	21; 19

=== Group C ===
Pos	Team	Pld	W	L	MF	MA	MD	GF	GA	GD	PF	PA	PD	Pts	Qualification	Indonesia	Malaysia	Chinese Taipei for Olympic games	Mongolia
1	Indonesia	3	3	0	14	1	+13	26	5	+21	633	381	+252	3	Advance to knockout stage	—	4–1	5–0	5–0
2	Malaysia	3	2	1	10	5	+5	24	9	+15	663	471	+192	2	Advance to knockout stage		—	4–1	5–0
3	Chinese Taipei	3	1	2	6	9	−3	13	19	−6	563	483	+80	1				—	5–0
4	Mongolia	3	0	3	0	15	−15	0	30	−30	106	630	−524	0					—

Source: BadmintonCN

==== Indonesia vs Mongolia ====
Indonesia
5
CPB Badminton and Sports Science Training Center, Court 5
9 July 2016, 10:00 UTC+7

Mongolia
0

			1	2	3
1	(Indonesia) (Mongolia)	Rinov Rivaldy / Vania Arianti Sukoco; Temuulen Gombodorj / Batchimeg Batnairamdal	21; 3	21; 3
2	(Indonesia) (Mongolia)	Chico Aura Dwi Wardoyo; Tuguldur Boldbaatar	21; 5	21; 6
3	(Indonesia) (Mongolia)	Gregoria Mariska Tunjung; Tegshzaya Choinkhor	21; 1	21; 1
4	(Indonesia) (Mongolia)	Calvin Kristanto / Bagas Maulana; Tuguldur Boldbaatar / Temuulen Gombodorj	21; 0	21; 0
5	(Indonesia) (Mongolia)	Mychelle Crhystine Bandaso / Serena Kani; Batchimeg Batnairamdal / Tegshzaya Choinkhor	21; 3	21; 2

==== Malaysia vs Chinese Taipei ====
Malaysia
4
CPB Badminton and Sports Science Training Center, Court 6
9 July 2016, 10:00 UTC+7

Chinese Taipei
1

			1	2	3
1	(Malaysia) (Chinese Taipei)	Chen Tang Jie / Toh Ee Wei; Liang Hua-chun / Hu Ling-fang	21; 13	21; 18
2	(Malaysia) (Chinese Taipei)	Lee Zii Jia; Lee Chia-hao	15; 21	21; 19	21; 16
3	(Malaysia) (Chinese Taipei)	Ooi Zi Heng / Soh Wooi Yik; Lu Ming-che / Yang Chun-hsien	21; 8	21; 11
4	(Malaysia) (Chinese Taipei)	Goh Jin Wei; Liang Ting-yu	21; 18	23; 21
5	(Malaysia) (Chinese Taipei)	Thinaah Muralitharan / Kisona Selvaduray; Hu Ling Fang / Lee Chih Chen	21; 15	18; 21	21; 23

==== Indonesia vs Chinese Taipei ====
Indonesia
5
CPB Badminton and Sports Science Training Center, Court 1
10 July 2016, 10:00 UTC+7

Chinese Taipei
0

			1	2	3
1	(Indonesia) (Chinese Taipei)	Amri Syahnawi / Mychelle Crhystine Bandaso; Ye Hong-wei / Hu Ling-fang	21; 16	21; 15
2	(Indonesia) (Chinese Taipei)	Ramadhani Zulkifli; Liang Hua-chun	21; 12	21; 13
3	(Indonesia) (Chinese Taipei)	Calvin Kristanto / Bagas Maulana; Lu Ming-che / Su Li-wei	21; 13	21; 19
4	(Indonesia) (Chinese Taipei)	Gregoria Mariska Tunjung; Lai I-ting	21; 18	21; 12
5	(Indonesia) (Chinese Taipei)	Apriyani Rahayu / Jauza Fadhila Sugiarto; Hu Ling-fang / Lee Chih-chen	21; 16	21; 15

==== Malaysia vs Mongolia ====
Malaysia
5
CPB Badminton and Sports Science Training Center, Court 2
10 July 2016, 10:00 UTC+7

Mongolia
0

			1	2	3
1	(Malaysia) (Mongolia)	Hoo Pang Ron / Pearly Tan; Temuulen Gombodorj / Tegshzaya Choinkhor	21; 4	21; 3
2	(Malaysia) (Mongolia)	Leong Jun Hao; Tuguldur Boldbaatar	21; 12	21; 14
3	(Malaysia) (Mongolia)	Eoon Qi Xuan; Batchimeg Batnairamdal	21; 3	21; 3
4	(Malaysia) (Mongolia)	Sim Fong Hau / Tan Jia Wei; Tuguldur Boldbaatar / Temuulen Gombodorj	21; 3	21; 5
5	(Malaysia) (Mongolia)	Toh Ee Wei / Yap Ling; Batchimeg Batnairamdal / Tegshzaya Choinkhor	21; 3	21; 4

==== Indonesia vs Malaysia ====
Indonesia
4
CPB Badminton and Sports Science Training Center, Court 5
10 July 2016, 17:00 UTC+7

Malaysia
1

			1	2	3
1	(Indonesia) (Malaysia)	Apriyani Rahayu / Rinov Rivaldy; Chen Tang Jie / Toh Ee Wei	22; 20	21; 13
2	(Indonesia) (Malaysia)	Chico Aura Dwi Wardoyo; Lee Zii Jia	10; 21	19; 21
3	(Indonesia) (Malaysia)	Gregoria Mariska Tunjung; Goh Jin Wei	18; 21	26; 24	21; 15
4	(Indonesia) (Malaysia)	Bagas Maulana / Rinov Rivaldy; Ooi Zi Heng / Soh Wooi Yik	17; 21	21; 13	21; 18
5	(Indonesia) (Malaysia)	Apriyani Rahayu / Jauza Fadhila Sugiarto; Goh Jin Wei / Thinaah Muralitharan	17; 21			retired

==== Chinese Taipei vs Mongolia ====
Chinese Taipei
5
CPB Badminton and Sports Science Training Center, Court 6
10 July 2016, 17:00 UTC+7

Mongolia
0

			1	2	3
1	(Chinese Taipei) (Mongolia)	Yang Chun-hsien / Lee Chih-chen; Temuulen Gombodorj / Tegshzaya Choinkhor	21; 1	21; 1
2	(Chinese Taipei) (Mongolia)	Liang Hua-chun; Tuguldur Boldbaatar	21; 4	21; 6
3	(Chinese Taipei) (Mongolia)	Hu Ling-fang; Batchimeg Batnairamdal	21; 2	21; 3
4	(Chinese Taipei) (Mongolia)	Su Li-wei / Ye Hong-wei; Tuguldur Boldbaatar / Temuulen Gombodorj	21; 3	21; 3
5	(Chinese Taipei) (Mongolia)	Chang Yu-hsuan / Lo Pei-tzu; Batchimeg Batnairamdal / Tegshzaya Choinkhor	21; 3	21; 2

=== Group D ===
Pos	Team	Pld	W	L	MF	MA	MD	GF	GA	GD	PF	PA	PD	Pts	Qualification	Thailand	India	Myanmar	Vietnam
1	Thailand (H)	3	3	0	14	1	+13	29	5	+24	701	440	+261	3	Advance to knockout stage	—	4–1	5–0	5–0
2	India	3	2	1	11	4	+7	25	9	+16	672	539	+133	2	Advance to knockout stage		—	5–0	5–0
3	Myanmar	3	1	2	3	12	−9	6	24	−18	376	603	−227	1				—	3–2
4	Vietnam	3	0	3	2	13	−11	4	26	−22	418	585	−167	0					—

Source: BadmintonCN
(H) Host

==== Thailand vs Vietnam ====
Thailand
5
CPB Badminton and Sports Science Training Center, Court 1
9 July 2016, 13:00 UTC+7

Vietnam
0

			1	2	3
1	(Thailand) (Vietnam)	Pakin Kuna-Anuvit / Jhenicha Sudjaipraparat; Lê Đức Phát / Phạm Thị Khánh	21; 10	21; 16
2	(Thailand) (Vietnam)	Kantaphon Wangcharoen; Đặng Quang Huy	21; 9	21; 9
3	(Thailand) (Vietnam)	Pornpawee Chochuwong; Trần Thị Phương Thúy	21; 7	21; 6
4	(Thailand) (Vietnam)	Warit Sarapat / Panachai Worasaktayanan; Đặng Quang Huy / Nguyễn Đức Giang	21; 11	21; 12
5	(Thailand) (Vietnam)	Nattamon Laisuan / Alisa Sapniti; Phạm Thị Khánh / Trần Thị Phương Thúy	21; 10	21; 13

==== India vs Myanmar ====
India
5
CPB Badminton and Sports Science Training Center, Court 2
9 July 2016, 17:00 UTC+7

Myanmar
0

			1	2	3
1	(India) (Myanmar)	Dhruv Kapila / Mithula Umakant; Aung Myo Htoo / Thet Htar Thuzar	21; 19	21; 15
2	(India) (Myanmar)	Lakshya Sen; Phone Pyae Naing	21; 14	21; 5
3	(India) (Myanmar)	Vrushali Gummadi; Thet Htar Thuzar	21; 14	21; 19
4	(India) (Myanmar)	Krishna Prasad Garaga / Dhruv Kapila; Aung Myo Htoo / Phone Pyae Naing	21; 15	21; 16
5	(India) (Myanmar)	K. Ashwini Bhat / Mithula Umakant; Dahlia / Thwe Tar Oo	21; 0	21; 9

==== Thailand vs Myanmar ====
Thailand
5
CPB Badminton and Sports Science Training Center, Court 3
10 July 2016, 10:00 UTC+7

Myanmar
0

			1	2	3
1	(Thailand) (Myanmar)	Panachai Worasaktayanan / Alisa Sapniti; Hein Si Thu Toe / Thwe Tar Oo	21; 13	21; 6
2	(Thailand) (Myanmar)	Phatharathorn Nipornram; Sai Wuu Phet	21; 15	21; 10
3	(Thailand) (Myanmar)	Lalinrat Chaiwan; Dahlia	21; 3	21; 4
4	(Thailand) (Myanmar)	Pakin Kunaanuwit / Natthapat Trinkajee; Arkar Phone Myat / Hein Si Thu Toe	21; 9	21; 8
5	(Thailand) (Myanmar)	Natchpapha Chatupornkarnchana / Sanicha Chumnibannakarn; Dahlia / Thwe Tar Oo	21; 9	21; 8

==== India vs Vietnam ====
India
5
CPB Badminton and Sports Science Training Center, Court 4
10 July 2016, 10:00 UTC+7

Vietnam
0

			1	2	3
1	(India) (Vietnam)	Dhruv Kapila / Mithula Umakant; Lê Đức Phát / Phạm Thị Khánh	21; 14	21; 16
2	(India) (Vietnam)	Vrushali Gummadi; Trần Thị Phương Thúy	21; 9	21; 6
3	(India) (Vietnam)	Lakshya Sen; Lê Đức Phát	21; 16	21; 11
4	(India) (Vietnam)	K. Ashwini Bhat / Mithula Umakant; Phạm Thị Khánh / Trần Thị Phương Thúy	21; 16	21; 14
5	(India) (Vietnam)	Krishna Prasad Garaga / Dhruv Kapila; Đặng Quang Huy / Nguyễn Đức Giang	21; 16	21; 14

==== Thailand vs India ====
Thailand
4
CPB Badminton and Sports Science Training Center, Court 1
10 July 2016, 17:00 UTC+7

India
1

			1	2	3
1	(Thailand) (India)	Pakin Kunaanuwit / Jhenicha Sudjaipraparat; Dhruv Kapila / Mithula Umakant	21; 13	22; 24	21; 14
2	(Thailand) (India)	Kantaphon Wangcharoen; Lakshya Sen	18; 21	22; 20	16; 21
3	(Thailand) (India)	Warit Sarapat / Panachai Worasaktayanan; Krishna Prasad Garaga / Dhruv Kapila	18; 21	21; 19	21; 17
4	(Thailand) (India)	Pornpawee Chochuwong; Vrushali Gummadi	21; 18	21; 18
5	(Thailand) (India)	Nattamon Laisuan / Alisa Sapniti; K. Ashwini Bhat / Mithula Umakant	17; 21	21; 11	21; 14

==== Vietnam vs Myanmar ====
Vietnam
2
CPB Badminton and Sports Science Training Center, Court 2
10 July 2016, 17:00 UTC+7

Myanmar
3

			1	2	3
1	(Vietnam) (Myanmar)	Đặng Quang Huy / Phạm Thị Khánh; Phone Pyae Naing / Thet Htar Thuzar	21; 23	19; 21
2	(Vietnam) (Myanmar)	Nguyễn Đức Giang; Aung Myo Htoo	21; 23	12; 21
3	(Vietnam) (Myanmar)	Trần Thị Phương Thúy; Thet Htar Thuzar	17; 21	9; 21
4	(Vietnam) (Myanmar)	Đặng Quang Huy / Lê Đức Phát; Aung Myo Htoo / Phone Pyae Naing	21; 12	21; 9
5	(Vietnam) (Myanmar)	Phạm Thị Khánh / Trần Thị Phương Thúy; Dahlia / Thwe Tar Oo	21; 8	21; 6

== Knockout stage ==
=== Bracket ===
Quarter-finals
11 July
China	3
Malaysia	0
11 July
Japan	3
India	0
11 July
South Korea	3
Indonesia	1
11 July
Hong Kong	1
Thailand	3

Semi-finals
11 July
China	3
Japan	0
11 July
South Korea	3
Thailand	1

Final
12 July
China	3
South Korea	1

=== Quarter-finals ===
==== China vs Malaysia ====
China
3
CPB Badminton and Sports Science Training Center, Court 1
11 July 2016, 10:00 UTC+7

Malaysia
0

			1	2	3
1	(China) (Malaysia)	He Jiting / Du Yue; Soh Wooi Yik / Thinaah Muralitharan	21; 11	21; 14
2	(China) (Malaysia)	Sun Feixiang; Lee Zii Jia	21; 13	21; 18
3	(China) (Malaysia)	Han Chengkai / Zhou Haodong; Chen Tang Jie / Hoo Pang Ron	21; 15	21; 14
4	(China) (Malaysia)	Chen Yufei; Kisona Selvaduray				not played
5	(China) (Malaysia)	Du Yue / Xu Ya; Toh Ee Wei / Yap Ling				not played

==== Japan vs India ====
Japan
3
CPB Badminton and Sports Science Training Center, Court 2
11 July 2016, 10:00 UTC+7

India
0

			1	2	3
1	(Japan) (India)	Hiroki Okamura / Masayuki Onodera; Krishna Prasad Garaga / Dhruv Kapila	21; 11	21; 12
2	(Japan) (India)	Natsuki Nidaira; Vrushali Gummadi	21; 16	21; 12
3	(Japan) (India)	Koki Watanabe; Lakshya Sen	21; 16	21; 11
4	(Japan) (India)	Sayaka Hobara / Nami Matsuyama; Mahima Aggarwal / Shikha Gautam				not played
5	(Japan) (India)	Naoki Yamazawa / Natsuki Sone; D. Chandra Kumar / Riya Mookerjee				not played

==== South Korea vs Indonesia ====
South Korea
3
CPB Badminton and Sports Science Training Center, Court 3
11 July 2016, 10:00 UTC+7

Indonesia
1

			1	2	3
1	(South Korea) (Indonesia)	Kim Won-ho / Lee Yu-lim; Amri Syahnawi / Apriyani Rahayu	21; 19	21; 16
2	(South Korea) (Indonesia)	Byun Jung-soo; Ramadhani Zulkifli	21; 11	17; 21	21; 12
3	(South Korea) (Indonesia)	Kim Ga-eun; Gregoria Mariska Tunjung	21; 17	12; 21	16; 21
4	(South Korea) (Indonesia)	Kang Min-hyuk / Kim Won-ho; Muhammad Fachrikar / Rinov Rivaldy	19; 21	21; 13	21; 16
5	(South Korea) (Indonesia)	Kim Ga-eun / Kim Hyang-im; Apriyani Rahayu / Jauza Fadhila Sugiarto				not played

==== Hong Kong vs Thailand ====
Hong Kong
1
CPB Badminton and Sports Science Training Center, Court 4
11 July 2016, 10:00 UTC+7

Thailand
3

			1	2	3
1	(Hong Kong) (Thailand)	Yeung Sum Yee; Pornpawee Chochuwong	6; 21	8; 21
2	(Hong Kong) (Thailand)	Chan Yin Chak; Phatharathorn Nipornram	17; 21	21; 17	14; 21
3	(Hong Kong) (Thailand)	Ng Tsz Yau / Yeung Nga Ting; Nattamon Laisuan / Alisa Sapniti	19; 21	21; 14	21; 14
4	(Hong Kong) (Thailand)	Chow Hin Long / Lam Wai Lok; Warit Sarapat / Panachai Worasaktayanon	19; 21	11; 21
5	(Hong Kong) (Thailand)	Chan Yin Chak / Ng Tsz Yau; Pakin Kunaanuwit / Jhenicha Sudjaipraparat				not played

=== Semi-finals ===
==== China vs Japan ====
China
3
CPB Badminton and Sports Science Training Center, Court 1
11 July 2016, 17:00 UTC+7

Japan
0

			1	2	3
1	(China) (Japan)	He Jiting / Du Yue; Hiroki Okamura / Nami Matsuyama	21; 13	21; 14
2	(China) (Japan)	Sun Feixiang; Koki Watanabe	17; 21	21; 16	21; 19
3	(China) (Japan)	Han Chengkai / Zhou Haodong; Hiroki Okamura / Masayuki Onodera	21; 17	21; 8
4	(China) (Japan)	Chen Yufei; Natsuki Nidaira				not played
5	(China) (Japan)	Du Yue / Xu Ya; Sayaka Hobara / Nami Matsuyama				not played

==== South Korea vs Thailand ====
South Korea
3
CPB Badminton and Sports Science Training Center, Court 2
11 July 2016, 17:00 UTC+7

Thailand
1

			1	2	3
1	(South Korea) (Thailand)	Kang Min-hyuk / Kim Won-ho; Warit Sarapat / Panachai Worasaktayanon	21; 17	21; 13
2	(South Korea) (Thailand)	Kim Ga-eun; Pornpawee Chochuwong	17; 21	25; 23	21; 19
3	(South Korea) (Thailand)	Kim Moon-jun; Kantaphon Wangcharoen	17; 21	20; 22
4	(South Korea) (Thailand)	Kim Ga-eun / Kim Hyang-im; Nattamon Laisuan / Alisa Sapniti	21; 12	22; 20
5	(South Korea) (Thailand)	Kim Won-ho / Lee Yu-lim; Pakin Kuna-Anuvit / Jhenicha Sudjaipraparat				not played

=== Final ===
==== China vs South Korea ====
China
3
CPB Badminton and Sports Science Training Center, Court 1
12 July 2016, 12:00 UTC+7

South Korea
1

			1	2	3
1	(China) (South Korea)	He Jiting / Du Yue; Kim Won-ho / Lee Yu-lim	21; 17	21; 19
2	(China) (South Korea)	Sun Feixiang; Byun Jung-soo	21; 8	21; 13
3	(China) (South Korea)	Han Chengkai / Zhou Haodong; Kang Min-hyuk / Kim Won-ho	22; 24	21; 12	19; 21
4	(China) (South Korea)	Chen Yufei; Kim Hyang-im	21; 13	21; 15
5	(China) (South Korea)	Du Yue / Xu Ya; Kim Ga-eun / Lee Ye-na				not played
