= 2010 Asian Junior Badminton Championships – Teams event =

Badminton championship in Kuala Lumpur, Malaysia

Teams event at the 2010 Asian Junior Badminton Championships
- Venue: Stadium Juara
- Location: Kuala Lumpur, Malaysia
- Dates: 21–24 March 2010

The team tournament at the 2010 Asian Junior Badminton Championships took place from 21 to 24 March 2010 at Stadium Juara in Kuala Lumpur, Malaysia. A total of 16 countries competed in this event.

== Group stage ==
=== Group A ===
Pos	Team	Pld	W	L	MF	MA	MD	GF	GA	GD	PF	PA	PD	Pts	Qualification	People's Republic of China	Singapore	Kazakhstan
1	China	2	2	0	10	0	+10	20	1	+19	442	207	+235	2	Advance to knockout stage	—	5–0	5–0
2	Singapore	2	1	1	5	5	0	11	11	0	363	364	−1	1			—	5–0
3	Kazakhstan	2	0	2	0	10	−10	1	20	−19	204	438	−234	0				—

Source: TS

==== China vs Kazakhstan ====
China
5
Stadium Juara, Court 1
21 March 2010, 09:00 UTC+8

Kazakhstan
0

			1	2	3
1	(China) (Kazakhstan)	Cai Ruiqing; Anton Klyam	21; 10	21; 9
2	(China) (Kazakhstan)	Suo Di; Vladlena Kharchenko	21; 6	21; 6
3	(China) (Kazakhstan)	Li Gen / Wang Tianyang; Artur Niyazov / Anton Klyam	21; 11	21; 13
4	(China) (Kazakhstan)	Bao Yixin / Ou Dongni; Romualda Volos / Ilyana Filipchuk	21; 5	21; 3
5	(China) (Kazakhstan)	Chen Zhuofu / Xia Huan; Artur Niyazov / Vladlena Kharchenko	21; 5	21; 4

==== Singapore vs Kazakhstan ====
Singapore
5
Stadium Juara, Court 1
21 March 2010, 18:00 UTC+8

Kazakhstan
0

			1	2	3
1	(Singapore) (Kazakhstan)	Koh Jia Yi / Cheong Hui Min; Anton Klyam / Vladlena Kharchenko	21; 10	18; 21	21; 17
2	(Singapore) (Kazakhstan)	Huang Chao; Artur Niyazov	21; 10	21; 8
3	(Singapore) (Kazakhstan)	Tan Wei Han; Romualda Volos	21; 8	21; 13
4	(Singapore) (Kazakhstan)	Ngo Yi Chye / Tan Kia Hwee; Niyazov Artur / Klyam Anton	21; 14	21; 16
5	(Singapore) (Kazakhstan)	Emily Chua / Noriko Goh; Vladlena Kharchenko / Romualda Volos	21; 7	21; 8

==== China vs Singapore ====
China
5
Stadium Juara, Court 1
22 March 2010, 09:00 UTC+8

Singapore
0

			1	2	3
1	(China) (Singapore)	Li Gen / Song Ziwei; Ngo Yi Chye / Tan Kia Hwee	21; 16	21; 10
2	(China) (Singapore)	Deng Xuan; Tan Wei Han	21; 12	21; 3
3	(China) (Singapore)	Huang Yuxiang; Huang Chao	21; 19	22; 24	21; 13
4	(China) (Singapore)	Tang Jinhua / Xia Huan; Emily Chua / Noriko Goh	21; 12	21; 8
5	(China) (Singapore)	Liu Cheng / Bao Yixin; Koh Jia Yi / Toh Siew Fen	21; 12	21; 6

=== Group B ===
Pos	Team	Pld	W	L	MF	MA	MD	GF	GA	GD	PF	PA	PD	Pts	Qualification	Malaysia	Hong Kong	Uzbekistan
1	Malaysia (H)	2	2	0	10	0	+10	20	2	+18	462	241	+221	2	Advance to knockout stage	—	5–0	5–0
2	Hong Kong	2	1	1	5	5	0	12	10	+2	388	318	+70	1			—	5–0
3	Uzbekistan	2	0	2	0	10	−10	0	20	−20	129	420	−291	0				—

Source: TS
(H) Host

==== Malaysia vs Uzbekistan ====
Malaysia
5
Stadium Juara, Court 2
21 March 2010, 09:00 UTC+8

Uzbekistan
0

			1	2	3
1	(Malaysia) (Uzbekistan)	Tan Wee Tat / Shevon Jemie Lai; Mansurhon Najmiddinov / Surayyo Ahmadjonova	21; 3	21; 6
2	(Malaysia) (Uzbekistan)	Zulfadli Zulkiffli; Temurbek Karimov	21; 5	21; 6
3	(Malaysia) (Uzbekistan)	Yang Li Lian; Mariya Pakina	21; 4	21; 4
4	(Malaysia) (Uzbekistan)	Nelson Heg / Teo Ee Yi; Temurbek Karimov / Mansurhon Najmiddinov	21; 5	21; 10
5	(Malaysia) (Uzbekistan)	Lai Pei Jing / Shevon Jemie Lai; Surayyo Ahmadjonova / Mariya Pakina	21; 10	21; 10

==== Hong Kong vs Uzbekistan ====
Hong Kong
5
Stadium Juara, Court 2
21 March 2010, 18:00 UTC+8

Uzbekistan
0

			1	2	3
1	(Hong Kong) (Uzbekistan)	Ng Ka Long / Yeung Yik Kei; Temurbek Karimov / Mariya Pakina	21; 17	21; 7
2	(Hong Kong) (Uzbekistan)	Lee Chun Hei; Mansurhon Najmiddinov	21; 6	21; 2
3	(Hong Kong) (Uzbekistan)	Yuen Sin Ying; Surayyo Ahmadjonova	21; 2	21; 1
4	(Hong Kong) (Uzbekistan)	Lee Chun Hei / Ng Ka Long; Temurbek Karimov / Mansurhon Najmiddinov	21; 12	21; 6
5	(Hong Kong) (Uzbekistan)	Shek Hiu Yiu / Tsang Wing Chiu; Surayyo Ahmadjonova / Mariya Pakina	21; 7	21; 6

==== Malaysia vs Hong Kong ====
Malaysia
5
Stadium Juara, Court 2
22 March 2010, 09:00 UTC+8

Hong Kong
0

			1	2	3
1	(Malaysia) (Hong Kong)	Ow Yao Han / Lai Pei Jing; Tam Chun Hei / Yuen Sin Ying	21; 6	21; 12
2	(Malaysia) (Hong Kong)	Loh Wei Sheng; Ng Ka Long	21; 18	21; 9
3	(Malaysia) (Hong Kong)	Soniia Cheah; Tsang Wing Chiu	21; 13	21; 10
4	(Malaysia) (Hong Kong)	Ow Yao Han / Yew Hong Kheng; Ng Ka Long / Lee Chun Hei	21; 16	22; 24	21; 17
5	(Malaysia) (Hong Kong)	Lai Pei Jing / Shevon Jemie Lai; Yeung Yik Kei / Shek Hiu Yiu	21; 17	20; 22	21; 14

=== Group C ===
Pos	Team	Pld	W	L	MF	MA	MD	GF	GA	GD	PF	PA	PD	Pts	Qualification	Thailand	Philippines	Sri Lanka
1	Thailand	2	2	0	10	0	+10	20	1	+19	433	275	+158	2	Advance to knockout stage	—	5–0	5–0
2	Philippines	2	1	1	3	7	−4	8	14	−6	330	409	−79	1			—	3–2
3	Sri Lanka	2	0	2	2	8	−6	5	18	−13	341	420	−79	0				—

Source: TS

==== Thailand vs Sri Lanka ====
Thailand
5
Stadium Juara, Court 3
21 March 2010, 09:00 UTC+8

Sri Lanka
0

			1	2	3
1	(Thailand) (Sri Lanka)	Inkarat Apisuk / Sapsiree Taerattanachai; Dilshan Kariyawasam / Upuli Weerasinghe	21; 11	21; 17
2	(Thailand) (Sri Lanka)	Pisit Poodchalat; Perera Rakhitha	21; 3	21; 11
3	(Thailand) (Sri Lanka)	Ratchanok Intanon; Achini Ratnasiri	21; 14	21; 9
4	(Thailand) (Sri Lanka)	Wannawat Ampunsuwan / Tinn Istiyanet; Dilshan Kariyawasam / Omal Dharmawardena	21; 12	21; 14
5	(Thailand) (Sri Lanka)	Chonthicha Kititharakul / Rassanan Phetmaneelumkha; Achini Ratnasiri / Upuli Weerasinghe	12; 21	21; 12	21; 19

==== Philippines vs Sri Lanka ====
Philippines
3
Stadium Juara, Court 3
21 March 2010, 18:00 UTC+8

Sri Lanka
2

			1	2	3
1	(Philippines) (Sri Lanka)	Malvinne Alcala; Achini Ratnasiri	21; 18	21; 9
2	(Philippines) (Sri Lanka)	Philip Joper Escueta; Omal Dharmawardena	21; 15	21; 15
3	(Philippines) (Sri Lanka)	Malvinne Alcala / Gelita Castilo; Achini Ratnasiri / Upuli Weerasinghe	21; 16	21; 15
4	(Philippines) (Sri Lanka)	Jose Nej Martinez / Niko Saquin; Dilshan Kariyawasam / Omal Dharmawardena	21; 19	10; 21	17; 21
5	(Philippines) (Sri Lanka)	Philip Joper Escueta / Gelita Castilo; Dilshan Kariyawasam / Upuli Weerasinghe	21; 7	3; 21	0; 21

==== Thailand vs Philippines ====
Thailand
5
Stadium Juara, Court 3
22 March 2010, 09:00 UTC+8

Philippines
0

			1	2	3
1	(Thailand) (Philippines)	Inkarat Apisuk / Sapsiree Taerattanachai; Niko Saquin / Nikki Therese Servando	21; 5	21; 9
2	(Thailand) (Philippines)	Pisit Poodchalat; Philip Joper Escueta	21; 15	21; 18
3	(Thailand) (Philippines)	Ratchanok Intanon; Malvinne Alcala	21; 10	21; 14
4	(Thailand) (Philippines)	Wannawat Ampunsuwan / Tinn Istiyanet; Jose Nej Martinez / Gerald Sibayan	22; 20	21; 11
5	(Thailand) (Philippines)	Maetanee Phattanaphitoon / Narissapat Lam; Malvinne Alcala / Nikki Therese Servando	21; 19	21; 11

=== Group D ===
Pos	Team	Pld	W	L	MF	MA	MD	GF	GA	GD	PF	PA	PD	Pts	Qualification	South Korea	Chinese Taipei for Olympic games	Maldives
1	South Korea	2	2	0	8	2	+6	17	4	+13	419	220	+199	2	Advance to knockout stage	—	3–2	5–0
2	Chinese Taipei	2	1	1	7	3	+4	14	7	+7	399	238	+161	1			—	5–0
3	Maldives	2	0	2	0	10	−10	0	20	−20	60	420	−360	0				—

Source: TS

==== Chinese Taipei vs Maldives ====
Chinese Taipei
5
Stadium Juara, Court 4
21 March 2010, 09:00 UTC+8

Maldives
0

			1	2	3
1	(Chinese Taipei) (Maldives)	Hung Ying-yuan / Su Hsiao-ting; Ahzam Mohamed / Haaly Aishath Lene	21; 1	21; 1
2	(Chinese Taipei) (Maldives)	Hsieh Feng-tse; Rishwan Shiyam	21; 7	21; 4
3	(Chinese Taipei) (Maldives)	Tai Tzu-ying; Moosa Aminath Shahurunaz	21; 4	21; 3
4	(Chinese Taipei) (Maldives)	Huang Po-jui / Lin Chia-yu; Ahzam Mohamed / Rishwan Shiyam	21; 1	21; 1
5	(Chinese Taipei) (Maldives)	Lee Fang-yu / Wu Yu-lun; Haaly Aishath Lene / Moosa Aminath Shahurunaz	21; 2	21; 5

==== South Korea vs Maldives ====
South Korea
5
Stadium Juara, Court 4
21 March 2010, 18:00 UTC+8

Maldives
0

			1	2	3
1	(South Korea) (Maldives)	Yoon Joo-young / Kim Chan-mi; Ahzam Mohamed / Haaly Aishath Lene	21; 2	21; 3
2	(South Korea) (Maldives)	Lee Hong-je; Rishwan Shiyam	21; 5	21; 3
3	(South Korea) (Maldives)	Kang Ga-hee; Moosa Aminath Shahurunaz	21; 2	21; 3
4	(South Korea) (Maldives)	Jin Yong-hoon / Kim Dae-sun; Ahzam Mohamed / Rishwan Shiyam	21; 3	21; 4
5	(South Korea) (Maldives)	Shin Seung-chan / Park So-young; Haaly Aishath Lene / Moosa Aminath Shahurunaz	21; 4	21; 2

==== Chinese Taipei vs South Korea ====
Chinese Taipei
2
Stadium Juara, Court 4
22 March 2010, 09:00 UTC+8

South Korea
3

			1	2	3
1	(Chinese Taipei) (South Korea)	Hung Ying-yuan / Chiang Mei-hui; Kang Ji-wook / Choi Hye-in	13; 21	14; 21
2	(Chinese Taipei) (South Korea)	Hsieh Feng-tse; Ha Young-woong	18; 21	21; 18	21; 13
3	(Chinese Taipei) (South Korea)	Huang Po-jui / Lin Chia-yu; Choi Seung-il / Kang Ji-wook	17; 21	18; 21
4	(Chinese Taipei) (South Korea)	Tai Tzu-ying; Yang Ran-sun	21; 12	21; 19
5	(Chinese Taipei) (South Korea)	Lee Fang-yu / Wu Yu-lun; Choi Hye-in / Lee So-hee	9; 21	16; 21

=== Group E ===
Pos	Team	Pld	W	L	MF	MA	MD	GF	GA	GD	PF	PA	PD	Pts	Qualification	Indonesia	Vietnam	Mongolia
1	Indonesia	2	2	0	10	0	+10	20	1	+19	436	189	+247	2	Advance to knockout stage	—	5–0	5–0
2	Vietnam	2	1	1	5	5	0	11	10	+1	360	267	+93	1			—	5–0
3	Mongolia	2	0	2	0	10	−10	0	20	−20	80	420	−340	0				—

Source: TS

==== Indonesia vs Mongolia ====
Indonesia
5
Stadium Juara, Court 5
21 March 2010, 09:00 UTC+8

Mongolia
0

			1	2	3
1	(Indonesia) (Mongolia)	Ricky Karanda Suwardi / Tiara Rosalia Nuraidah; Batdavaa Munkhbat / Khulangoo Baatar	21; 3	21; 3
2	(Indonesia) (Mongolia)	Evert Sukamta; Enkhmandakh Purevsuren	21; 9	21; 3
3	(Indonesia) (Mongolia)	Renna Suwarno; Munkhbayar Dulamsuren	21; 0	21; 1
4	(Indonesia) (Mongolia)	Jones Ralfy Jansen / Dandi Prabudita; Byambadorj Bat-Erdene / Batdavaa Munkhbat	21; 3	21; 7
5	(Indonesia) (Mongolia)	Suci Rizki Andini / Della Destiara Haris; Khulangoo Baatar / Dulamsuren Munkhbayar	21; 5	21; 5

==== Vietnam vs Mongolia ====
Vietnam
5
Stadium Juara, Court 5
21 March 2010, 18:00 UTC+8

Mongolia
0

			1	2	3
1	(Vietnam) (Mongolia)	Lương Khánh Tân / Nguyễn Thị Mai Anh; Enkhmandakh Purevsuren / Dulamsuren Munkhbayar	21; 6	21; 4
2	(Vietnam) (Mongolia)	Trần Văn Trí; Batdavaa Munkhbat	21; 7	21; 2
3	(Vietnam) (Mongolia)	Vũ Thị Trang; Khulangoo Baatar	21; 3	21; 2
4	(Vietnam) (Mongolia)	Nguyễn Khắc Tuân / Phạm Hải Nam; Enkhmandakh Purevsuren / Byambadorj Bat-Erdene	21; 6	21; 4
5	(Vietnam) (Mongolia)	Lê Thu Huyền / Phạm Như Thảo; Khulangoo Baatar / Dulamsuren Munkhbayar	21; 1	21; 6

==== Indonesia vs Vietnam ====
Indonesia
5
Stadium Juara, Court 5
22 March 2010, 09:00 UTC+8

Vietnam
0

			1	2	3
1	(Indonesia) (Vietnam)	Jones Ralfy Jansen / Dandi Prabudita; Nguyễn Khắc Tuân / Phạm Hải Nam	21; 16	21; 10
2	(Indonesia) (Vietnam)	Renna Suwarno; Vũ Thị Trang	21; 14	16; 21	21; 15
3	(Indonesia) (Vietnam)	Sugja Riyanto; Huỳnh Vinh	21; 16	21; 9
4	(Indonesia) (Vietnam)	Tiara Rosalia Nuraidah / Gebby Ristiyani Imawan; Lê Thu Huyền / Phạm Như Thảo	21; 12	21; 9
5	(Indonesia) (Vietnam)	Ricky Karanda Suwardi / Della Destiara Haris; Nguyễn Huỳnh Thông Thảo / Vũ Thị Trang	21; 17	21; 11

=== Group F ===
Pos	Team	Pld	W	L	MF	MA	MD	GF	GA	GD	PF	PA	PD	Pts	Qualification	India	Japan	Cambodia
1	India	2	2	0	8	2	+6	16	6	+10	441	250	+191	2	Advance to knockout stage	—	3–2	5–0
2	Japan	2	1	1	7	3	+4	16	6	+10	416	280	+136	1			—	5–0
3	Cambodia	2	0	2	0	10	−10	0	20	−20	93	420	−327	0				—

Source: TS

==== Japan vs Cambodia ====
Japan
5
Stadium Juara, Court 6
21 March 2010, 09:00 UTC+8

Cambodia
0

			1	2	3
1	(Japan) (Cambodia)	Tatsuya Hasegawa / Kento Horiuchi; Leng Khlaychhit / Leng Sopheaktra	21; 6	21; 7
2	(Japan) (Cambodia)	Nozomi Okuhara; Chan Dara	21; 4	21; 2
3	(Japan) (Cambodia)	Kento Momota; Sieng Kimhong	21; 7	21; 8
4	(Japan) (Cambodia)	Naoko Fukuman / Kurumi Yonao; Chan Dara / Youth Sovansamnang	21; 5	21; 3
5	(Japan) (Cambodia)	Shohei Hoshino / Naoko Fukuman; Chea Senvisoth / Youth Sovansamnang	21; 3	21; 4

==== India vs Cambodia ====
India
5
Stadium Juara, Court 6
21 March 2010, 18:00 UTC+8

Cambodia
0

			1	2	3
1	(India) (Cambodia)	Pranav Chopra / Prajakta Sawant; Leng Khlaychhit / Youth Sovansamnang	21; 8	21; 0
2	(India) (Cambodia)	B. Sai Praneeth; Leng Sopheaktra	21; 5	21; 8
3	(India) (Cambodia)	P. V. Sindhu; Chan Dara	21; 3	21; 7
4	(India) (Cambodia)	Prannoy H. S. / Pranav Chopra; Chea Senvisoth / Sieng Kimhong	21; 3	21; 6
5	(India) (Cambodia)	N. Sikki Reddy / Prajakta Sawant; Chan Dara / Youth Sovansamnang	21; 3	21; 1

==== Japan vs India ====
Japan
2
Stadium Juara, Court 6
22 March 2010, 09:00 UTC+8

India
3

			1	2	3
1	(Japan) (India)	Shohei Hoshino / Naoko Fukuman; Pranav Chopra / Prajakta Sawant	13; 21	15; 21
2	(Japan) (India)	Kento Momota; B. Sai Praneeth	14; 21	21; 19	12; 21
3	(Japan) (India)	Nozomi Okuhara; P. V. Sindhu	21; 13	21; 16
4	(Japan) (India)	Tatsuya Hasegawa / Shohei Hoshino; Pranav Chopra / B. Sai Praneeth	11; 21	23; 21	13; 21
5	(Japan) (India)	Naoko Fukuman / Kurumi Yonao; N. Sikki Reddy / Prajakta Sawant	21; 18	21; 18

== Knockout stage ==
=== Bracket ===
Quarter-finals
22 July
South Korea	0
Indonesia	3
22 July
India	1
Thailand	3

Semi-finals
23 July
China	3
Indonesia	2
23 July
Thailand	1
Malaysia	3

Final
24 July
China	3
Malaysia	2

=== Quarter-finals ===
==== South Korea vs Indonesia ====
South Korea
0
Stadium Juara, Court 1
22 March 2010, 18:00 UTC+8

Indonesia
3

			1	2	3
1	(South Korea) (Indonesia)	Kang Ji-wook / Choi Hye-in; Ricky Karanda Suwardi / Della Destiara Haris	21; 13	18; 21	16; 21
2	(South Korea) (Indonesia)	Kim Min-ki; Evert Sukamta	19; 21	14; 21
3	(South Korea) (Indonesia)	Choi Seung-il / Kang Ji-wook; Jones Ralfy Jansen / Dandi Prabudita	18; 21	12; 21
4	(South Korea) (Indonesia)	Kang Ga-hee; Renna Suwarno				not played
5	(South Korea) (Indonesia)	Choi Hye-in / Lee So-hee; Haris Della Destiara / Andini Suci Rizki				not played

==== India vs Thailand ====
India
1
Stadium Juara, Court 2
22 March 2010, 18:00 UTC+8

Thailand
3

			1	2	3
1	(India) (Thailand)	Pranav Chopra / Prajakta Sawant; Inkarat Apisuk / Sapsiree Taerattanachai	22; 20	21; 16
2	(India) (Thailand)	B. Sai Praneeth; Pisit Poodchalat	21; 18	14; 21	6; 21
3	(India) (Thailand)	N. Sikki Reddy; Ratchanok Intanon	21; 18	14; 21	7; 8	retired
4	(India) (Thailand)	Pranav Chopra / B. Sai Praneeth; Wannawat Ampunsuwan / Tinn Istiyanet				w/o
5	(India) (Thailand)	N. Sikki Reddy / Prajakta Sawant; Ratchanok Intanon / Sapsiree Taerattanachai

=== Semi-finals ===
==== China vs Indonesia ====
China
3
Stadium Juara, Court 1
23 March 2010, 09:00 UTC+8

Indonesia
2

			1	2	3
1	(China) (Indonesia)	Liu Cheng / Bao Yixin; Ricky Karanda Suwardi / Della Destiara Haris	21; 19	21; 19
2	(China) (Indonesia)	Cai Ruiqing; Evert Sukamta	16; 21	14; 21
3	(China) (Indonesia)	Li Gen / Song Ziwei; Jones Ralfy Jansen / Dandi Prabudita	18; 21	21; 14	18; 21
4	(China) (Indonesia)	Suo Di; Renna Suwarno	21; 13	21; 14
5	(China) (Indonesia)	Tang Jinhua / Xia Huan; Suci Rizki Andini / Della Destiara Haris	21; 12	21; 17

==== Thailand vs Malaysia ====
Thailand
1
Stadium Juara, Court 2
23 March 2010, 09:00 UTC+8

Malaysia
3

			1	2	3
1	(Thailand) (Malaysia)	Inkarat Apisuk / Sapsiree Taerattanachai; Ow Yao Han / Lai Pei Jing	21; 19	15; 21	17; 21
2	(Thailand) (Malaysia)	Pisit Poodchalat; Zulfadli Zulkiffli	10; 21	21; 17	19; 21
3	(Thailand) (Malaysia)	Ratchanok Intanon; Soniia Cheah	21; 17	21; 17
4	(Thailand) (Malaysia)	Wannawat Ampunsuwan / Tinn Istiyanet; Ow Yao Han / Yew Hong Kheng	9; 21	22; 20	18; 21
5	(Thailand) (Malaysia)	Ratchanok Intanon / Sapsiree Taerattanachai; Lai Pei Jing / Shevon Jemie Lai

=== Final ===
==== China vs Malaysia ====
China
3
Stadium Juara, Court 1
24 March 2010, 09:00 UTC+8

Malaysia
2

			1	2	3
1	(China) (Malaysia)	Liu Cheng / Bao Yixin; Ow Yao Han / Lai Pei Jing	21; 16	21; 17
2	(China) (Malaysia)	Huang Yuxiang; Zulkiffli Zulfadli	17; 21	12; 21
3	(China) (Malaysia)	Li Gen / Song Ziwei; Ow Yao Han / Yew Hong Kheng	8; 21	11; 21
4	(China) (Malaysia)	Suo Di; Soniia Cheah	22; 20	21; 15
5	(China) (Malaysia)	Tang Jinhua / Xia Huan; Lai Pei Jing / Shevon Jemie Lai	21; 7	21; 9
