= 2006 Asian Junior Badminton Championships – Teams event =

Badminton championship in Kuala Lumpur, Malaysia

Teams' event at the 2006 Asian Junior Badminton Championships
- Venue: Kuala Lumpur Badminton Stadium
- Location: Kuala Lumpur, Malaysia
- Dates: 3–6 July 2006

The team tournament at the 2006 Asian Junior Badminton Championships took place from 3 to 6 July 2006 at the Kuala Lumpur Badminton Stadium in Kuala Lumpur, Malaysia. A total of 20 countries competed in this event.

This was the first time the mixed team event at the Asian Junior Championships was held since the first edition in 1997. Badminton Asia (then the Badminton Asia Confederation) scrapped the boys' and girls' team events and replaced both with the mixed team event as way to give countries that are weaker in the sport to compete in the championships.

== Group stage ==
=== Group A ===
| Pos | Team | Pld | W | L | MF | MA | MD | GF | GA | GD | PF | PA | PD | Pts | Qualification | Philippines | Pakistan | Cambodia | Jordan |
|---|---|---|---|---|---|---|---|---|---|---|---|---|---|---|---|---|---|---|---|
| 1 | Philippines | 3 | 3 | 0 | 15 | 0 | +15 | 30 | 0 | +30 | 630 | 308 | +322 | 3 | Advance to knockout stage | — | 5–0 | 5–0 | 5–0 |
| 2 | Pakistan | 3 | 2 | 1 | 10 | 5 | +5 | 20 | 11 | +9 | 560 | 485 | +75 | 2 | Advance to knockout stage | | — | 5–0 | 5–0 |
| 3 | Cambodia | 3 | 1 | 2 | 3 | 12 | −9 | 7 | 24 | −17 | 441 | 610 | −169 | 1 | | | | — | 3–2 |
| 4 | Jordan | 3 | 0 | 3 | 2 | 13 | −11 | 5 | 27 | −22 | 409 | 637 | −228 | 0 | | | | | — |

Source: BAM

=== Group B ===
| Pos | Team | Pld | W | L | MF | MA | MD | GF | GA | GD | PF | PA | PD | Pts | Qualification | North Korea | Kazakhstan | Bhutan | Mongolia |
|---|---|---|---|---|---|---|---|---|---|---|---|---|---|---|---|---|---|---|---|
| 1 | North Korea | 3 | 3 | 0 | 13 | 2 | +11 | 26 | 6 | +20 | 636 | 400 | +236 | 3 | Advance to knockout stage | — | 4–1 | 4–1 | 5–0 |
| 2 | Kazakhstan | 3 | 2 | 1 | 9 | 6 | +3 | 20 | 13 | +7 | 610 | 446 | +164 | 2 | Advance to knockout stage | | — | 3–2 | 5–0 |
| 3 | Bhutan | 3 | 1 | 2 | 8 | 7 | +1 | 18 | 15 | +3 | 553 | 505 | +48 | 1 | | | | — | 5–0 |
| 4 | Mongolia | 3 | 0 | 3 | 0 | 15 | −15 | 0 | 30 | −30 | 184 | 632 | −448 | 0 | | | | | — |

Source: BAM

== Knockout stage ==
=== Bracket ===
Round of 16
1 | Malaysia | 3
A2 | Pakistan | 0
Vietnam | 0
Japan | 3
3/4 | Singapore | 0
China | 3
B2 | Kazakhstan | 1
B1 | North Korea | 3
A1 | Philippines | 0
Hong Kong | 3
India | 0
3/4 | Indonesia | 3
Chinese Taipei | 3
Sri Lanka | 0
Thailand | 0
2 | South Korea | 3

Quarter-finals
1 | Malaysia | 3
Japan | 1
China | 3
B1 | North Korea | 0
Hong Kong | 0
3/4 | Indonesia | 3
Chinese Taipei | 0
2 | South Korea | 3

Semi-finals
1 | Malaysia | 3
China | 1
3/4 | Indonesia | 1
2 | South Korea | 3

Final
1 | Malaysia | 2
2 | South Korea | 3

=== Round of 16 ===
Malaysia
3
Kuala Lumpur Badminton Stadium
3 July 2006

Pakistan
0

| | | | 1 | 2 | 3 |
|---|---|---|---|---|---|---|
| 1 | (Malaysia) (Pakistan) | Mohamad Arif Abdul Latif; Syed Ali Mehdi | 21; 9 | 21; 5 |
| 2 | (Malaysia) (Pakistan) | Lyddia Cheah; Mahrukh Isa | 21; 5 | 21; 3 |
| 3 | (Malaysia) (Pakistan) | Lim Khim Wah / Mak Hee Chun; Murad Ali / Zaran Ghazali | 21; 10 | 21; 11 |
| 4 | (Malaysia) (Pakistan) | Ho Bee Ling / Woon Khe Wei; Palwasha Bashir / Sara Khan | | | | not played |
| 5 | (Malaysia) (Pakistan) | Tan Wee Kiong / Woon Khe Wei; Murad Ali / Sara Khan | | | | not played |

Japan
3
Kuala Lumpur Badminton Stadium
3 July 2006

Vietnam
0

| | | | 1 | 2 | 3 |
|---|---|---|---|---|---|---|
| 1 | (Japan) (Vietnam) | Takuma Ueda; Nguyễn Hoàng Nam | 21; 5 | 21; 14 |
| 2 | (Japan) (Vietnam) | Megumi Taruno; Lý Trần Ngọc Bích | 21; 13 | 21; 8 |
| 3 | (Japan) (Vietnam) | Kazuki Matsumaru / Kenichi Tago; Huỳnh Trí Thịnh / Dương Bảo Đức | 21; 13 | 21; 16 |
| 4 | (Japan) (Vietnam) | Mizuki Fujii / Megumi Taruno; Nguyễn Thị Sen / Phùng Nguyễn Phương Nhi | | | | not played |
| 5 | (Japan) (Vietnam) | Kenichi Tago / Mizuki Fujii; Dương Bảo Đức / Lý Trần Ngọc Bích | | | | not played |

Singapore
0
Kuala Lumpur Badminton Stadium
3 July 2006

China
3

| | | | 1 | 2 | 3 |
|---|---|---|---|---|---|---|
| 1 | (Singapore) (China) | Xing Aiying; Wang Yihan | 13; 21 | 16; 21 |
| 2 | (Singapore) (China) | Derek Wong; Lu Qicheng | 20; 22 | 13; 21 |
| 3 | (Singapore) (China) | Thng Boon Seong / Shinta Mulia Sari; Li Tian / Ma Jin | 15; 21 | 11; 21 |
| 4 | (Singapore) (China) | Shinta Mulia Sari / Xing Aiying; Ma Jin / Wang Xiaoli | | | | not played |
| 5 | (Singapore) (China) | Jonathan Tang / Derek Wong; Hu Wenqing / Li Tian | | | | not played |

North Korea
3
Kuala Lumpur Badminton Stadium
3 July 2006

Kazakhstan
1

| | | | 1 | 2 | 3 |
|---|---|---|---|---|---|---|
| 1 | (North Korea) (Kazakhstan) | Yu Ho-chol; Anton Knol | 21; 11 | 21; 13 |
| 2 | (North Korea) (Kazakhstan) | Kim Ryon-mi; Karina Suleyeva | 21; 18 | 22; 20 |
| 3 | (North Korea) (Kazakhstan) | Kim Mi-hyang / Kim Ryon-mi; Karina Suleyeva / Romualda Volos | 10; 21 | 17; 21 |
| 4 | (North Korea) (Kazakhstan) | Ri Un-nam / Yu Ho-chol; Anton Knol / Ivan Yakubel | 21; 8 | 21; 12 |
| 5 | (North Korea) (Kazakhstan) | Ri Un-nam / Kim Mi-hyang; Ivan Yakubel / Romualda Volos | | | | not played |

Hong Kong
3
Kuala Lumpur Badminton Stadium
3 July 2006

Philippines
0

| | | | 1 | 2 | 3 |
|---|---|---|---|---|---|---|
| 1 | (Hong Kong) (Philippines) | Wong Shu Ki; Kelvin Tim Ang | 21; 14 | 21; 12 |
| 2 | (Hong Kong) (Philippines) | Chan Tsz Ka; Raquel Guerrero | 21; 11 | 21; 11 |
| 3 | (Hong Kong) (Philippines) | Lau Chi Yin / Poon Lok Yan; Michael Bryan Chan / Rachel Guerrero | 25; 23 | 21; 15 |
| 4 | (Hong Kong) (Philippines) | Lau Chi Yin / Wong Shu Ki; Kelvin Tim Ang / Michael Bryan Chan | | | | not played |
| 5 | (Hong Kong) (Philippines) | Chan Tsz Ka / Yeung Hiu Tung; Rachel Guerrero / Raquel Guerrero | | | | not played |

Indonesia
3
Kuala Lumpur Badminton Stadium
3 July 2006

India
0

| | | | 1 | 2 | 3 |
|---|---|---|---|---|---|---|
| 1 | (Indonesia) (India) | Bandar Sigit Pamungkas; Jishnu Sanyal | 21; 16 | 16; 21 | 21; 19 |
| 2 | (Indonesia) (India) | Pia Zebadiah Bernadet; Saina Nehwal | 19; 21 | 21; 16 | 21; 18 |
| 3 | (Indonesia) (India) | Fernando Kurniawan / Subakti; Akshay Dewalkar / Jishnu Sanyal | 21; 13 | 21; 16 |
| 4 | (Indonesia) (India) | Bellaetrix Manuputty / Keshya Nurvita Hanadia; Ashwini Ponnappa / Nitya Sosale | | | | not played |
| 5 | (Indonesia) (India) | Subakti / Pia Zebadiah Bernadet; Arun Vishnu / Nitya Sosale | | | | not played |

Chinese Taipei
3
Kuala Lumpur Badminton Stadium
3 July 2006

Sri Lanka
0

| | | | 1 | 2 | 3 |
|---|---|---|---|---|---|---|
| 1 | (Chinese Taipei) (Sri Lanka) | Cheng Ching-hung; Rajitha Dahanayake | 21; 10 | 21; 15 |
| 2 | (Chinese Taipei) (Sri Lanka) | Chou Yu-ting; Lakshi Ginige | 21; 4 | 21; 9 |
| 3 | (Chinese Taipei) (Sri Lanka) | Liao Min-chun / Hsieh Pei-chen; Thilan Sepalage / Subodha Dahanayake | 21; 7 | 21; 7 |
| 4 | (Chinese Taipei) (Sri Lanka) | Hsieh Pei-chen / Lee Tai-an; Lakshi Ginige / Subodha Dahanayake | | | | not played |
| 5 | (Chinese Taipei) (Sri Lanka) | Liao Min-chun / Liu Chia-hung; Chamika Manawadu / Yehan Ranasinghe | | | | not played |

South Korea
3
Kuala Lumpur Badminton Stadium
3 July 2006

Thailand
0

| | | | 1 | 2 | 3 |
|---|---|---|---|---|---|---|
| 1 | (South Korea) (Thailand) | Hong Ji-hoon; Pakkawat Vilailak | 17; 21 | 21; 16 | 21; 18 |
| 2 | (South Korea) (Thailand) | Jang Soo-young; Porntip Buranaprasertsuk | 21; 19 | 21; 13 |
| 3 | (South Korea) (Thailand) | Lee Yong-dae / Yoo Hyun-young; Nuttavut Sanlekanan / Nuttaya Sanlekanan | 21; 10 | 21; 7 |
| 4 | (South Korea) (Thailand) | Sun In-jang / Yoo Hyun-young; Porntip Buranaprasertsuk / Nuttaya Sanlekanan | | | | not played |
| 5 | (South Korea) (Thailand) | Cho Gun-woo / Lee Yong-dae; Nuttavut Sanlekanan / Pakkawat Vilailak | | | | not played |

=== Quarter-finals ===
Malaysia
3
Kuala Lumpur Badminton Stadium
4 July 2006

Japan
1

| | | | 1 | 2 | 3 |
|---|---|---|---|---|---|---|
| 1 | (Malaysia) (Japan) | Tan Wee Kiong / Woon Khe Wei; Kenichi Tago / Mizuki Fujii | 21; 19 | 16; 21 | 18; 21 |
| 2 | (Malaysia) (Japan) | Mohamad Arif Abdul Latif; Takuma Ueda | 14; 21 | 22; 20 | 21; 17 |
| 3 | (Malaysia) (Japan) | Lyddia Cheah; Megumi Taruno | 21; 14 | 22; 20 |
| 4 | (Malaysia) (Japan) | Lim Khim Wah / Mak Hee Chun; Kazuki Matsumaru / Kenichi Tago | 21; 17 | 15; 21 | 22; 20 |
| 5 | (Malaysia) (Japan) | Ho Bee Ling / Woon Khe Wei; Mizuki Fujii / Megumi Taruno | | | | not played |

China
3
Kuala Lumpur Badminton Stadium
4 July 2006

North Korea
0

| | | | 1 | 2 | 3 |
|---|---|---|---|---|---|---|
| 1 | (China) (North Korea) | Wang Yihan; Kim Ryon-mi | 21; 5 | 21; 3 |
| 2 | (China) (North Korea) | Lu Qicheng; Yu Ho-chol | 21; 8 | 21; 6 |
| 3 | (China) (North Korea) | Li Tian / Ma Jin; Ri Un-nam / Kim Mi-hyang | 21; 11 | 21; 7 |
| 4 | (China) (North Korea) | Ma Jin / Wang Xiaoli; Kim Mi-hyang / Kim Ryon-mi | | | | not played |
| 5 | (China) (North Korea) | Hu Wenqing / Li Tian; Ri Un-nam / Yu Ho-chol | | | | not played |

Indonesia
3
Kuala Lumpur Badminton Stadium
4 July 2006

Hong Kong
0

| | | | 1 | 2 | 3 |
|---|---|---|---|---|---|---|
| 1 | (Indonesia) (Hong Kong) | Wisnu Haryo Putro; Wong Shu Ki | 21; 16 | 21; 11 |
| 2 | (Indonesia) (Hong Kong) | Aprilia Yuswandari; Chan Tsz Ka | 19; 21 | 21; 14 | 21; 15 |
| 3 | (Indonesia) (Hong Kong) | Fernando Kurniawan / Subakti; Lau Chi Yin / Wong Shu Ki | 21; 16 | 21; 12 |
| 4 | (Indonesia) (Hong Kong) | Bellaetrix Manuputty / Keshya Nurvita Hanadia; Chan Tsz Ka / Yeung Hiu Tung | | | | not played |
| 5 | (Indonesia) (Hong Kong) | Subakti / Pia Zebadiah Bernadet; Lau Chi Yin / Poon Lok Yan | | | | not played |

South Korea
3
Kuala Lumpur Badminton Stadium
4 July 2006

Chinese Taipei
0

| | | | 1 | 2 | 3 |
|---|---|---|---|---|---|---|
| 1 | (South Korea) (Chinese Taipei) | Lee Yong-dae / Yoo Hyun-young; Liao Min-chun / Hsieh Pei-chen | 21; 10 | 21; 19 |
| 2 | (South Korea) (Chinese Taipei) | Choi Sang-won; Cheng Ching-hung | 15; 21 | 21; 19 | 21; 15 |
| 3 | (South Korea) (Chinese Taipei) | Kim Moon-hi; Chou Yu-ting | 21; 9 | 21; 19 |
| 4 | (South Korea) (Chinese Taipei) | Sun In-jang / Yoo Hyun-young; Hsieh Pei-chen / Lee Tai-an | | | | not played |
| 5 | (South Korea) (Chinese Taipei) | Cho Gun-woo / Lee Yong-dae; Liao Min-chun / Liu Chia-hung | | | | not played |

=== Semi-finals ===
Malaysia
3
Kuala Lumpur Badminton Stadium
5 July 2006

China
1

| | | | 1 | 2 | 3 |
|---|---|---|---|---|---|---|
| 1 | (Malaysia) (China) | Mohamad Arif Abdul Latif; Lu Qicheng | 18; 21 | 27; 25 | 14; 21 |
| 2 | (Malaysia) (China) | Lyddia Cheah; Wang Yihan | 25; 23 | 21; 17 |
| 3 | (Malaysia) (China) | Lim Khim Wah / Mak Hee Chun; Hu Wenqing / Li Tian | 21; 15 | 21; 19 |
| 4 | (Malaysia) (China) | Tan Wee Kiong / Woon Khe Wei; Li Tian / Ma Jin | 21; 15 | 19; 21 | 21; 19 |
| 5 | (Malaysia) (China) | Ho Bee Ling / Woon Khe Wei; Ma Jin / Wang Xiaoli | | | | not played |

South Korea
3
Kuala Lumpur Badminton Stadium
5 July 2006

Indonesia
1

| | | | 1 | 2 | 3 |
|---|---|---|---|---|---|---|
| 1 | (South Korea) (Indonesia) | Hong Ji-hoon; Wisnu Haryo Putro | 20; 22 | 21; 15 | 21; 14 |
| 2 | (South Korea) (Indonesia) | Kim Moon-hi; Pia Zebadiah Bernadet | 11; 21 | 21; 19 | 19; 21 |
| 3 | (South Korea) (Indonesia) | Cho Gun-woo / Lee Yong-dae; Fernando Kurniawan / Subakti | 21; 15 | 21; 8 |
| 4 | (South Korea) (Indonesia) | Lee Yong-dae / Yoo Hyun-young; Subakti / Lily Siswanti | 21; 12 | 21; 11 |
| 5 | (South Korea) (Indonesia) | Sun In-jang / Yoo Hyun-young; Bellaetrix Manuputty / Keshya Nurvita Hanadia | | | | not played |

=== Final ===
Malaysia
2
Kuala Lumpur Badminton Stadium
6 July 2006

South Korea
3

| | | | 1 | 2 | 3 |
|---|---|---|---|---|---|
| 1 | (Malaysia) (South Korea) | Mohamad Arif Abdul Latif; Hong Ji-hoon | 21; 14 | 11; 21 | 22; 20 |
| 2 | (Malaysia) (South Korea) | Lyddia Cheah; Jang Soo-young | 21; 23 | 21; 8 | 21; 13 |
| 3 | (Malaysia) (South Korea) | Lim Khim Wah / Mak Hee Chun; Cho Gun-woo / Lee Yong-dae | 11; 21 | 15; 21 |
| 4 | (Malaysia) (South Korea) | Ho Bee Ling / Woon Khe Wei; Sun In-jang / Yoo Hyun-young | 16; 21 | 16; 21 |
| 5 | (Malaysia) (South Korea) | Tan Wee Kiong / Woon Khe Wei; Lee Yong-dae / Yoo Hyun-young | 18; 21 | 12; 21 |
