= 2011 Asian Junior Badminton Championships – Teams event =

Badminton championship in Lucknow, India

Teams event at the 2011 Asian Junior Badminton Championships
- Venue: Babu Banarasi Das Indoor Stadium
- Location: Lucknow, India
- Dates: 2–5 July 2011

The team tournament at the 2011 Asian Junior Badminton Championships took place from 2 to 5 July 2011 at Babu Banarasi Das Indoor Stadium in Lucknow, India. A total of 15 countries competed in this event. Iran withdrew from the tournament.

== Group stage ==
=== Group A ===
Pos	Team	Pld	W	L	MF	MA	MD	GF	GA	GD	PF	PA	PD	Pts	Qualification	People's Republic of China	Japan	Bangladesh	United Arab Republic
1	China	3	3	0	14	1	+13	29	4	+25	666	308	+358	3	Advance to knockout stage	—	4–1	5–0	5–0
2	Japan	3	2	1	11	4	+7	24	9	+15	618	381	+237	2	Advance to knockout stage		—	5–0	5–0
3	Bangladesh	3	1	2	3	12	−9	6	24	−18	308	599	−291	1				—	3–2
4	Syria	3	0	3	2	13	−11	4	26	−22	287	591	−304	0					—

Source: BadmintonCN

==== China vs Syria ====
China
5
Babu Banarasi Das Indoor Stadium, Court 5
2 July 2011, 09:00 UTC+5:30

Syria
0

			1	2	3
1	(China) (Syria)	Chen Zhuofu / Xiong Rui; Ahmad Aljallad / Tagred Aljallad	21; 3	21; 4
2	(China) (Syria)	Guo Kai; Aram Mahmoud	21; 4	21; 9
3	(China) (Syria)	Hui Xirui; Sanaa Mahmoud	21; 9	21; 10
4	(China) (Syria)	Liu Yuchen / Zhuge Lukai; Ahmad Aljallad / Aram Mahmoud	21; 7	21; 2
5	(China) (Syria)	Huang Yaqiong / Yu Xiaohan; Tagred Aljallad / Sanaa Mahmoud	21; 2	21; 7

==== Japan vs Bangladesh ====
Japan
5
Babu Banarasi Das Indoor Stadium, Court 6
2 July 2011, 09:00 UTC+5:30

Bangladesh
0

			1	2	3
1	(Japan) (Bangladesh)	Dai Watanabe / Ayano Torii; Karim Md. Rezaul / Rehana Parvin	21; 5	21; 11
2	(Japan) (Bangladesh)	Ayako Sakuramoto; Bristy Khatun	21; 7	21; 3
3	(Japan) (Bangladesh)	Akira Koga; Hossain Mohammad Arif	21; 6	22; 20
4	(Japan) (Bangladesh)	Saori Hayakawa / Nozomi Okuhara; Bristy Khatun / Rehana Parvin	21; 7	21; 2
5	(Japan) (Bangladesh)	Takuto Inoue / Keiichiro Matsui; Hossain Mohammad Arif / Karim Md. Rezaul	21; 10	21; 12

==== China vs Bangladesh ====
China
5
Babu Banarasi Das Indoor Stadium, Court 1
2 July 2011, 16:00 UTC+5:30

Bangladesh
0

			1	2	3
1	(China) (Bangladesh)	Pei Tianyi / Ou Dongni; Karim Md. Rezaul / Bristy Khatun	21; 2	21; 4
2	(China) (Bangladesh)	Xue Song; Hossain Mohammad Arif	21; 4	21; 1
3	(China) (Bangladesh)	Zheng Yu; Rehana Parvin	21; 4	21; 6
4	(China) (Bangladesh)	Chen Zhuofu / Li Junhui; Hossain Mohammad Arif / Karim Md. Rezaul	21; 12	21; 13
5	(China) (Bangladesh)	Jia Xiao / Xiong Rui; Bristy Khatun / Rehana Parvin	21; 5	21; 3

==== Japan vs Syria ====
Japan
5
Babu Banarasi Das Indoor Stadium, Court 2
2 July 2011, 16:00 UTC+5:30

Syria
0

			1	2	3
1	(Japan) (Syria)	Takuto Inoue / Sayaka Komiyama; Ahmad Aljallad / Tagred Aljallad	21; 4	21; 3
2	(Japan) (Syria)	Kento Momota; Aram Mahmoud	21; 9	21; 8
3	(Japan) (Syria)	Nozomi Okuhara; Sanaa Mahmoud	21; 7	21; 4
4	(Japan) (Syria)	Jo Chiba / Akira Koga; Ahmad Aljallad / Aram Mahmoud	21; 5	21; 3
5	(Japan) (Syria)	Ayako Sakuramoto / Ayano Torii; Tagred Aljallad / Sanaa Mahmoud	21; 4	21; 5

==== Bangladesh vs Syria ====
Bangladesh
3
Babu Banarasi Das Indoor Stadium, Court 2
3 July 2011, 09:00 UTC+5:30

Syria
2

			1	2	3
1	(Bangladesh) (Syria)	Karim Md. Rezaul / Rehana Parvin; Ahmad Aljallad / Tagred Aljallad	23; 21	21; 10
2	(Bangladesh) (Syria)	Hossain Mohammad Arif; Aram Mahmoud	21; 18	21; 17
3	(Bangladesh) (Syria)	Bristy Khatun; Sanaa Mahmoud	7; 21	11; 21
4	(Bangladesh) (Syria)	Hossain Mohammad Arif / Karim Md. Rezaul; Ahmad Aljallad / Aram Mahmoud	21; 16	21; 12
5	(Bangladesh) (Syria)	Bristy Khatun / Rehana Parvin; Tagred Aljallad / Sanaa Mahmoud	17; 21	8; 21

==== China vs Japan ====
China
4
Babu Banarasi Das Indoor Stadium, Court 2
3 July 2011, 16:00 UTC+5:30

Japan
1

			1	2	3
1	(China) (Japan)	Pei Tianyi / Ou Dongni; Takuto Inoue / Saori Hayakawa	21; 15	21; 7
2	(China) (Japan)	Huang Yuxiang; Kento Momota	12; 21	21; 16	15; 21
3	(China) (Japan)	Chen Zhuofu / Pei Tianyi; Jo Chiba / Akira Koga	21	19; 12	21; 21
4	(China) (Japan)	Sun Yu; Nozomi Okuhara	21	11; 6	21; 21
5	(China) (Japan)	Ou Dongni / Xiong Rui; Ayako Sakuramoto / Ayano Torii	21; 17	21; 7

=== Group B ===
Pos	Team	Pld	W	L	MF	MA	MD	GF	GA	GD	PF	PA	PD	Pts	Qualification	Chinese Taipei for Olympic games	Thailand	Sri Lanka	Jordan
1	Chinese Taipei	3	3	0	11	4	+7	25	8	+17	654	416	+238	3	Advance to knockout stage	—	3–2	3–2	5–0
2	Thailand	3	2	1	11	4	+7	22	10	+12	605	418	+187	2	Advance to knockout stage		—	4–1	5–0
3	Sri Lanka	3	1	2	8	7	+1	16	15	+1	525	460	+65	1				—	5–0
4	Jordan	3	0	3	0	15	−15	0	30	−30	140	630	−490	0					—

Source: BadmintonCN

==== Thailand vs Jordan ====
Thailand
5
Babu Banarasi Das Indoor Stadium, Court 3
2 July 2011, 09:00 UTC+5:30

Jordan
0

			1	2	3
1	(Thailand) (Jordan)	Samatcha Tovannakasem / Panjarat Pransopon; Edwan Thaer / Domou Amro	21; 1	21; 5
2	(Thailand) (Jordan)	Maetenee Phattanaphitoon; Haneen Derar Al-Wedyan	21; 3	21; 4
3	(Thailand) (Jordan)	Khosit Phetpradab; Ahmad Alwaqfi	21; 9	21; 9
4	(Thailand) (Jordan)	Pacharakamol Arkornsakul / Chonthicha Kititharakul; Haneen Derar Al-Wedyan / Domou Amro	21; 2	21; 2
5	(Thailand) (Jordan)	Wannawat Ampunsuwan / Tinn Isriyanet; Ahmad Alwaqfi / Edwan Thaer	21; 4	21; 7

==== Chinese Taipei vs Sri Lanka ====
Chinese Taipei
3
Babu Banarasi Das Indoor Stadium, Court 4
2 July 2011, 09:00 UTC+5:30

Sri Lanka
2

			1	2	3
1	(Chinese Taipei) (Sri Lanka)	Lin Chia-yu / Chen Yen-hua; Chamika Karunaratne / Upuli Weerasinghe	21; 17	21; 7
2	(Chinese Taipei) (Sri Lanka)	Wang Tzu-wei; Perera Rakhitha	21; 10	21; 11
3	(Chinese Taipei) (Sri Lanka)	Tang Wan-yi; Achini Ratnasiri	14; 21	18; 21
4	(Chinese Taipei) (Sri Lanka)	Huang Po-jui / Lin Chia-yu; Chamika Karunaratne / Perera Rakhitha	21; 13	21; 18
5	(Chinese Taipei) (Sri Lanka)	Shuai Pei-ling / Wu Ti-jung; Achini Ratnasiri / Upuli Weerasinghe	20; 22	21; 9	18; 21

==== Thailand vs Sri Lanka ====
Thailand
4
Babu Banarasi Das Indoor Stadium, Court 4
2 July 2011, 16:00 UTC+5:30

Sri Lanka
1

			1	2	3
1	(Thailand) (Sri Lanka)	Wannawat Ampunsuwan / Chonthicha Kititharakul; Chamika Karunaratne / Upuli Weerasinghe	21; 5	21; 14
2	(Thailand) (Sri Lanka)	Rawinda Prajongjai; Achini Ratnasiri	13; 21	12; 21
3	(Thailand) (Sri Lanka)	Khosit Phetpradab; Omal Dharmawardena	21; 14	21; 4
4	(Thailand) (Sri Lanka)	Wannawat Ampunsuwan / Tinn Isriyanet; Chamika Karunaratne / Perera Rakhitha	22; 20	21; 14
5	(Thailand) (Sri Lanka)	Maetenee Phattanaphitoon / Panjarat Pransopon; Achini Ratnasiri / Upuli Weerasinghe	21; 19	21; 13

==== Chinese Taipei vs Jordan ====
Chinese Taipei
5
Babu Banarasi Das Indoor Stadium, Court 5
2 July 2011, 16:00 UTC+5:30

Jordan
0

			1	2	3
1	(Chinese Taipei) (Jordan)	Huang Po-jui / Chen Yen-hua; Ahmad Alwaqfi / Haneen Derar Al-Wedyan	21; 3	21; 7
2	(Chinese Taipei) (Jordan)	Tang Wan-yi; Domou Amro	21; 2	21; 9
3	(Chinese Taipei) (Jordan)	Wang Tzu-wei; Edwan Thaer	21; 6	21; 6
4	(Chinese Taipei) (Jordan)	Shuai Pei-ling / Wu Ti-jung; Haneen Derar Al-Wedyan / Domou Amro	21; 2	21; 4
5	(Chinese Taipei) (Jordan)	Huang Po-jui / Lin Chia-yu; Ahmad Alwaqfi / Edwan Thaer	21; 3	21; 3

==== Sri Lanka vs Jordan ====
Sri Lanka
5
Babu Banarasi Das Indoor Stadium, Court 5
3 July 2011, 09:00 UTC+5:30

Jordan
0

			1	2	3
1	(Sri Lanka) (Jordan)	Perera Rakhitha / Upuli Weerasinghe; Edwan Thaer / Domou Amro	21; 8	21; 3
2	(Sri Lanka) (Jordan)	Omal Dharmawardena; Ahmad Alwaqfi	21; 6	21; 9
3	(Sri Lanka) (Jordan)	Achini Ratnasiri; Haneen Derar Al-Wedyan	21; 6	21; 4
4	(Sri Lanka) (Jordan)	Chamika Karunaratne / Perera Rakhitha; Ahmad Alwaqfi / Edwan Thaer	21; 5	21; 3
5	(Sri Lanka) (Jordan)	Achini Ratnasiri / Upuli Weerasinghe; Haneen Derar Al-Wedyan / Domou Amro	21; 3	21; 2

==== Thailand vs Chinese Taipei ====
Thailand
2
Babu Banarasi Das Indoor Stadium, Court 1
3 July 2011, 16:00 UTC+5:30

Chinese Taipei
3

			1	2	3
1	(Thailand) (Chinese Taipei)	Wannawat Ampunsuwan / Tinn Isriyanet; Huang Po-jui / Lin Chia-yu	13; 21	12; 21
2	(Thailand) (Chinese Taipei)	Rawinda Prajongjai; Tang Wan-yi	11; 21	21; 10	21; 17
3	(Thailand) (Chinese Taipei)	Khosit Phetpradab; Wang Tzu-wei	17; 21	17; 21
4	(Thailand) (Chinese Taipei)	Maetenee Phattanaphitoon / Panjarat Pransopon; Shuai Pei-ling / Wu Ti-jung	14; 21	18; 21
5	(Thailand) (Chinese Taipei)	Wannawat Ampunsuwan / Chonthicha Kititharakul; Huang Po-jui / Chen Yen-hua	21; 16	15; 21	21; 16

=== Group C ===
Pos	Team	Pld	W	L	MF	MA	MD	GF	GA	GD	PF	PA	PD	Pts	Qualification	Indonesia	Hong Kong	Singapore	Nepal
1	Indonesia	3	3	0	14	1	+13	29	3	+26	658	385	+273	3	Advance to knockout stage	—	4–1	5–0	5–0
2	Hong Kong	3	2	1	9	6	+3	19	14	+5	602	524	+78	2	Advance to knockout stage		—	3–2	5–0
3	Singapore	3	1	2	7	8	−1	16	17	−1	570	532	+38	1				—	5–0
4	Nepal	3	0	3	0	15	−15	0	30	−30	241	630	−389	0					—

Source: BadmintonCN

==== Hong Kong vs Singapore ====
Hong Kong
3
Babu Banarasi Das Indoor Stadium, Court 1
2 July 2011, 09:00 UTC+5:30

Singapore
2

			1	2	3
1	(Hong Kong) (Singapore)	Tam Chun Hei; Gerald Ong	12; 21	21; 19	21; 13
2	(Hong Kong) (Singapore)	Cheung Ngan Yi; Liang Xiaoyu	16; 21	21; 13	10; 21
3	(Hong Kong) (Singapore)	Lee Chun Hei / Ng Ka Long; Alton Chew / Ngo Yi Chye	21; 19	21; 13
4	(Hong Kong) (Singapore)	Cheung Ying Mei / Yuen Sin Ying; Aisyah Latib / Tan Wei Han	18; 21	18; 21
5	(Hong Kong) (Singapore)	Ng Ka Long / Cheung Ngan Yi; Gerald Ong / Tan Wei Han	21; 14	21; 19

==== Indonesia vs Nepal ====
Indonesia
5
Babu Banarasi Das Indoor Stadium, Court 2
2 July 2011, 09:00 UTC+5:30

Nepal
0

			1	2	3
1	(Indonesia) (Nepal)	Praveen Jordan / Rangga Yave Rianto; Irfan Ansari / Ratnajit Tamang	21; 7	21; 7
2	(Indonesia) (Nepal)	Yulia Yosephine Susanto; Poonam Gurung	21; 9	21; 6
3	(Indonesia) (Nepal)	Shesar Hiren Rhustavito; Dipesh Dhami	21; 10	21; 9
4	(Indonesia) (Nepal)	Suci Rizky Andini / Tiara Rosalia Nuraidah; Amita Giri / Sichhya Shrestha	21; 4	21; 6
5	(Indonesia) (Nepal)	Lukhi Apri Nugroho / Gloria Emanuelle Widjaja; Sudeep Sedhai / Manila Shrestha	21; 3	21; 8

==== Hong Kong vs Nepal ====
Hong Kong
5
Babu Banarasi Das Indoor Stadium, Court 1
3 July 2011, 09:00 UTC+5:30

Nepal
0

			1	2	3
1	(Hong Kong) (Nepal)	Chang Tak Ching / Yuen Sin Ying; Irfan Ansari / Manila Shrestha	21; 10	21; 10
2	(Hong Kong) (Nepal)	Ng Ka Long; Dipesh Dhami	21; 10	21; 9
3	(Hong Kong) (Nepal)	Cheung Ngan Yi; Sichhya Shrestha	21; 8	21; 9
4	(Hong Kong) (Nepal)	Lee Chun Hei / Tam Chun Hei; Dipesh Dhami / Ratnajit Tamang	21; 6	21; 9
5	(Hong Kong) (Nepal)	Cheung Ying Mei / Yuen Sin Ying; Poonam Gurung / Manila Shrestha	21; 8	21; 7

==== Indonesia vs Singapore ====
Indonesia
5
Babu Banarasi Das Indoor Stadium, Court 3
3 July 2011, 09:00 UTC+5:30

Singapore
0

			1	2	3
1	(Indonesia) (Singapore)	Ronald Alexander / Selvanus Geh; Muhammad Asraf Ishak / Gerald Ong	21; 10	21; 9
2	(Indonesia) (Singapore)	Elisabeth Purwaningtyas; Liang Xiaoyu	17; 21	21; 14	21; 16
3	(Indonesia) (Singapore)	Panji Akbar Sudrajat; Ngo Yi Chye	21; 14	21; 17
4	(Indonesia) (Singapore)	Suci Rizky Andini / Tiara Rosalia Nuraidah; Aisyah Latib / Toh Siew Fen	21; 8	21; 11
5	(Indonesia) (Singapore)	Lukhi Apri Nugroho / Gloria Emanuelle Widjaja; Gerald Ong / Tan Wei Han	21; 13	21; 12

==== Indonesia vs Hong Kong ====
Indonesia
4
Babu Banarasi Das Indoor Stadium, Court 4
3 July 2011, 16:00 UTC+5:30

Hong Kong
1

			1	2	3
1	(Indonesia) (Hong Kong)	Praveen Jordan / Rangga Yave Rianto; Lee Chun Hei / Ng Ka Long	21; 14	21; 19
2	(Indonesia) (Hong Kong)	Yulia Yosephine Susanto; Cheung Ngan Yi	21; 13	21; 16
3	(Indonesia) (Hong Kong)	Shesar Hiren Rhustavito; Tam Chun Hei	15; 21	21; 13	17; 21
4	(Indonesia) (Hong Kong)	Suci Rizky Andini / Tiara Rosalia Nuraidah; Cheung Ying Mei / Yuen Sin Ying	21; 10	21; 8
5	(Indonesia) (Hong Kong)	Lukhi Apri Nugroho / Gloria Emanuelle Widjaja; Ng Ka Long / Cheung Ngan Yi	21; 17	21; 19

==== Singapore vs Nepal ====
Singapore
5
Babu Banarasi Das Indoor Stadium, Court 5
3 July 2011, 16:00 UTC+5:30

Nepal
0

			1	2	3
1	(Singapore) (Nepal)	Gerald Ong / Tan Wei Han; Irfan Ansari / Poonam Gurung	21; 11	21; 11
2	(Singapore) (Nepal)	Liang Xiaoyu; Sichhya Shrestha	21; 6	21; 3
3	(Singapore) (Nepal)	Gerald Ong; Ratnajit Tamang	18; 21	21; 13	21; 8
4	(Singapore) (Nepal)	Tan Wei Han / Toh Siew Fen; Poonam Gurung / Manila Shrestha	21; 8	21; 8
5	(Singapore) (Nepal)	Alton Chew / Muhammad Asraf Ishak; Dipesh Dhami / Ratnajit Tamang	21; 11	21; 17

=== Group D ===
Pos	Team	Pld	W	L	MF	MA	MD	GF	GA	GD	PF	PA	PD	Pts	Qualification	Malaysia	India	Vietnam	Iran
1	Malaysia	2	2	0	8	2	+6	17	6	+11	450	351	+99	2	Advance to knockout stage	—	3–2	5–0	w.o.
2	India (H)	2	1	1	7	3	+4	15	7	+8	432	345	+87	1	Advance to knockout stage		—	5–0	w.o.
3	Vietnam	2	0	2	0	10	−10	1	20	−19	251	437	−186	0				—	w.o.
4	Iran	0	0	0	0	0	0	0	0	0	0	0	0	0	Withdrew				—

Source: BadmintonCN
(H) Host

==== India vs Vietnam ====
India
5
Babu Banarasi Das Indoor Stadium, Court 3
2 July 2011, 16:00 UTC+5:30

Vietnam
0

			1	2	3
1	(India) (Vietnam)	Srikanth Kidambi / K. Maneesha; Lương Khánh Tân / Lê Thu Huyền	21; 13	21; 13
2	(India) (Vietnam)	Sameer Verma; Đỗ Tuấn Đức	21; 5	21; 11
3	(India) (Vietnam)	P. V. Sindhu; Nguyễn Thị Mai Anh	21; 8	21; 8
4	(India) (Vietnam)	Srikanth Kidambi / Hema Nagendra Babu Thandarang; Đỗ Tuấn Đức / Lương Khánh Tân	21; 18	21; 14
5	(India) (Vietnam)	K. Maneesha / P. V. Sindhu; Lê Thu Huyền / Phạm Như Thảo	21; 14	21; 18

==== Malaysia vs Iran ====
Malaysia
-
Babu Banarasi Das Indoor Stadium, Court 6
2 July 2011, 16:00 UTC+5:30

Iran
Withdrew

		1	2	3
1	(Malaysia) (Iran)
2	(Malaysia) (Iran)
3	(Malaysia) (Iran)
4	(Malaysia) (Iran)
5	(Malaysia) (Iran)

==== Malaysia vs Vietnam ====
Malaysia
5
Babu Banarasi Das Indoor Stadium, Court 4
3 July 2011, 09:00 UTC+5:30

Vietnam
0

			1	2	3
1	(Malaysia) (Vietnam)	Teo Ee Yi / Yang Li Lian; Lương Khánh Tân / Phạm Như Thảo	21; 7	21; 9
2	(Malaysia) (Vietnam)	Zulfadli Zulkiffli; Đỗ Tuấn Đức	21; 9	21; 7
3	(Malaysia) (Vietnam)	Soniia Cheah; Lê Thu Huyền	16; 21	21; 14	21; 8
4	(Malaysia) (Vietnam)	Low Juan Shen / Jagdish Singh; Đỗ Tuấn Đức / Lương Khánh Tân	21; 10	21; 14
5	(Malaysia) (Vietnam)	Chow Mei Kuan / Lee Meng Yean; Nguyễn Thị Mai Anh / Phạm Như Thảo	22; 20	21; 10

==== India vs Iran ====
India
-
Babu Banarasi Das Indoor Stadium, Court 6
3 July 2011, 09:00 UTC+5:30

Iran
Withdrew

		1	2	3
1	(India) (Iran)
2	(India) (Iran)
3	(India) (Iran)
4	(India) (Iran)
5	(India) (Iran)

==== Malaysia vs India ====
Malaysia
3
Babu Banarasi Das Indoor Stadium, Court 3
3 July 2011, 16:00 UTC+5:30

India
2

			1	2	3
1	(Malaysia) (India)	Nelson Heg / Chow Mei Kuan; Srikanth Kidambi / K. Maneesha	21; 18	19; 21	21; 17
2	(Malaysia) (India)	Nur Mohd Azriyn Ayub; Sameer Verma	10; 21	12; 21
3	(Malaysia) (India)	Soniia Cheah; P. V. Sindhu	21; 14	24; 22
4	(Malaysia) (India)	Nelson Heg / Teo Ee Yi; Srikanth Kidambi / Hema Nagendra Babu Thandarang	21; 18	21; 16
5	(Malaysia) (India)	Chow Mei Kuan / Lee Meng Yean; K. Maneesha / P. V. Sindhu	18; 21	21; 12	14; 21

==== Vietnam vs Iran ====
Vietnam
-
Babu Banarasi Das Indoor Stadium, Court 6
3 July 2011, 16:00 UTC+5:30

Iran
Withdrew

		1	2	3
1	(Vietnam) (Iran)
2	(Vietnam) (Iran)
3	(Vietnam) (Iran)
4	(Vietnam) (Iran)
5	(Vietnam) (Iran)

== Knockout stage ==
=== Bracket ===
Quarter-finals
4 July
China	3
Hong Kong	1
4 July
Chinese Taipei	0
India	3
4 July
Japan	2
Indonesia	3
4 July
Thailand	0
Malaysia	3

Semi-finals
4 July
China	3
India	1
4 July
Indonesia	1
Malaysia	3

Final
5 July
China	3
Malaysia	1

=== Quarter-finals ===
==== China vs Hong Kong ====
China
4
Babu Banarasi Das Indoor Stadium, Court 2
4 July 2011, 09:00 UTC+5:30

Hong Kong
1

			1	2	3
1	(China) (Hong Kong)	Guo Kai; Ng Ka Long	21; 19	21; 16
2	(China) (Hong Kong)	Hui Xirui; Cheung Ngan Yi	21; 18	15; 21	21; 16
3	(China) (Hong Kong)	Chen Zhuofu / Pei Tianyi; Lee Chun Hei / Tam Chun Hei	21; 13	17; 21	18; 21
4	(China) (Hong Kong)	Ou Dongni / Xiong Rui; Cheung Ying Mei / Yuen Sin Ying	21; 11	21; 16
5	(China) (Hong Kong)	Chen Zhuofu / Ou Dongni; Ng Ka Long / Cheung Ngan Yi				not played

==== Chinese Taipei vs India ====
Chinese Taipei
0
Babu Banarasi Das Indoor Stadium, Court 3
4 July 2011, 09:00 UTC+5:30

India
3

			1	2	3
1	(Chinese Taipei) (India)	Lin Chia-yu / Chen Yen-hua; Srikanth Kidambi / K. Maneesha	14; 21	17; 21
2	(Chinese Taipei) (India)	Wang Tzu-wei; Sameer Verma	14; 21	19; 21
3	(Chinese Taipei) (India)	Tang Wan-yi; P. V. Sindhu	17; 21	13; 21
4	(Chinese Taipei) (India)	Huang Po-jui / Lin Chia-yu; Srikanth Kidambi / Hema Nagendra Babu Thandarang				not played
5	(Chinese Taipei) (India)	Shuai Pei-ling / Wu Ti-jung; K. Maneesha / P. V. Sindhu				not played

==== Japan vs Indonesia ====
Japan
2
Babu Banarasi Das Indoor Stadium, Court 4
4 July 2011, 09:00 UTC+5:30

Indonesia
3

			1	2	3
1	(Japan) (Indonesia)	Takuto Inoue / Akira Koga; Praveen Jordan / Rangga Yave Rianto	18; 21	13; 21
2	(Japan) (Indonesia)	Nozomi Okuhara; Yulia Yosephine Susanto	21; 17	21; 8
3	(Japan) (Indonesia)	Kento Momota; Panji Akbar Sudrajat	21; 10	21; 11
4	(Japan) (Indonesia)	Saori Hayakawa / Nozomi Okuhara; Suci Rizky Andini / Tiara Rosalia Nuraidah	21; 15	14; 21	18; 21
5	(Japan) (Indonesia)	Dai Watanabe / Ayano Torii; Lukhi Apri Nugroho / Gloria Emanuelle Widjaja	18; 21	16; 21

==== Thailand vs Malaysia ====
Thailand
0
Babu Banarasi Das Indoor Stadium, Court 5
4 July 2011, 09:00 UTC+5:30

Malaysia
3

			1	2	3
1	(Thailand) (Malaysia)	Wannawat Ampunsuwan / Chonthicha Kititharakul; Teo Ee Yi / Chow Mei Kuan	21; 23	17; 21
2	(Thailand) (Malaysia)	Khosit Phetpradab; Zulfadli Zulkiffli	16; 21	19; 21
3	(Thailand) (Malaysia)	Wannawat Ampunsuwan / Tinn Isriyanet; Nelson Heg / Teo Ee Yi	14; 21	12; 21
4	(Thailand) (Malaysia)	Rawinda Prajongjai; Soniia Cheah				not played
5	(Thailand) (Malaysia)	Maetenee Phattanaphitoon / Panjarat Pransopon; Chow Mei Kuan / Lee Meng Yean				not played

=== Semi-finals ===
==== China vs India ====
China
3
Babu Banarasi Das Indoor Stadium, Court 4
4 July 2011, 16:00 UTC+5:30

India
0

			1	2	3
1	(China) (India)	Pei Tianyi / Ou Dongni; Srikanth Kidambi / K. Maneesha	21; 13	21; 11
2	(China) (India)	Guo Kai; Pratul Joshi	12; 21	22; 20	21; 19
3	(China) (India)	Chen Zhuofu / Pei Tianyi; B. Venkatesh / Shivam Sharma	21; 14	21; 16
4	(China) (India)	Sun Yu; Tanvi Lad				not played
5	(China) (India)	Ou Dongni / Xiong Rui; K. Maneesha / P. V. Sindhu				not played

==== Indonesia vs Malaysia ====
Indonesia
1
Babu Banarasi Das Indoor Stadium, Court 2
4 July 2011, 16:00 UTC+5:30

Malaysia
3

			1	2	3
1	(Indonesia) (Malaysia)	Lukhi Apri Nugroho / Gloria Emanuelle Widjaja; Teo Ee Yi / Chow Mei Kuan	15; 21	14; 21
2	(Indonesia) (Malaysia)	Shesar Hiren Rhustavito; Zulfadli Zulkiffli	21; 14	21; 11
3	(Indonesia) (Malaysia)	Praveen Jordan / Rangga Yave Rianto; Nelson Heg / Teo Ee Yi	16; 21	19; 21
4	(Indonesia) (Malaysia)	Elisabeth Purwaningtyas; Soniia Cheah	14; 21	11; 21
5	(Indonesia) (Malaysia)	Suci Rizky Andini / Tiara Rosalia Nuraidah; Chow Mei Kuan / Lee Meng Yean				not played

=== Final ===
==== China vs Malaysia ====
China
3
Babu Banarasi Das Indoor Stadium, Court 1
4 July 2011, 13:30 UTC+5:30

Malaysia
1

			1	2	3
1	(China) (Malaysia)	Pei Tianyi / Ou Dongni; Teo Ee Yi / Chow Mei Kuan	21; 18	21; 13
2	(China) (Malaysia)	Huang Yuxiang; Zulfadli Zulkiffli	21; 16	21; 17
3	(China) (Malaysia)	Chen Zhuofu / Pei Tianyi; Nelson Heg / Teo Ee Yi	21; 13	12; 21	29; 30
4	(China) (Malaysia)	Sun Yu; Soniia Cheah	18; 21	21; 17	21; 14
5	(China) (Malaysia)	Ou Dongni / Xiong Rui; Chow Mei Kuan / Lee Meng Yean				not played
