= 2009 Sudirman Cup =

Tournament details
- Dates: 10 – 17 May
- Edition: 11th
- Level: International
- Venue: Guangzhou Gymnasium
- Location: Guangzhou, China

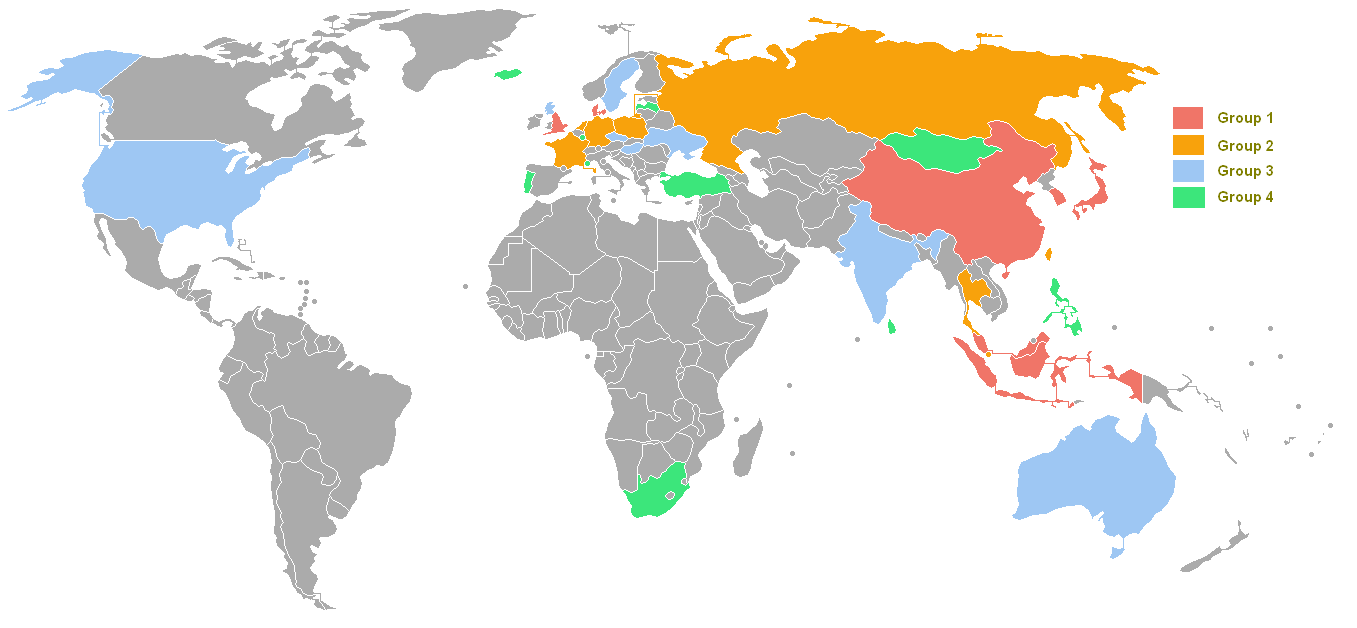
Participating countries

The 2009 Sudirman Cup (World Mixed Team Badminton Championships) was held in the Guangzhou Gymnasium in China from May 10 to May 17, 2009, having been arranged in December 2005. It was the eleventh contest.

Guangzhou has a tradition of staging badminton tournaments (The China Open was held in Guangzhou from 2005 to 2007, Thomas and Uber Cup in 2002 as well). The Sudirman Cup is part of the city's campaign of "hosting a major sporting event every year" in the run up to the 2010 Asian Games, which will be held in the same city.

China defeated Korea to win the title for the seventh time.

== Host city selection ==
Guangzhou is the only bidder for this event and later selected to host the tournament by Badminton World Federation during a council meeting in Kuala Lumpur. Denmark and India also expressed interest in hosting the event.

== Venue ==
- Guangzhou Gymnasium

== Group 1 ==
Semifinals
Relegation playoff

=== Group A ===
Team	Pts	Pld	W	L	MF	MA
South Korea	3	3	3	0	10	5
Malaysia	2	3	2	1	9	6
Denmark	1	3	1	2	6	9
Hong Kong	0	3	0	3	5	10

=== Group B ===
Team	Pts	Pld	W	L	MF	MA
China	3	3	3	0	15	0
Indonesia	2	3	2	1	8	7
England	1	3	1	2	5	10
Japan	0	3	0	3	2	13

May 10, 2009
Malaysia	2–3	South Korea
Denmark	3–2	Hong Kong
May 11, 2009
Malaysia	4–1	Hong Kong
May 12, 2009
Denmark	1–4	South Korea
May 13, 2009
South Korea	3–2	Hong Kong
May 14, 2009
Denmark	2–3	Malaysia

May 10, 2009
Indonesia	4–1	Japan
China	5–0	England
May 11, 2009
Indonesia	4–1	England
May 12, 2009
China	5–0	Japan
May 13, 2009
England	4–1	Japan
May 14, 2009
Indonesia	0–5	China

=== Play-offs ===
May 15, 2009	Denmark	3–2	England	5th/6th
	Hong Kong	1–3	Japan	7th/8th, Hong Kong is relegated to Group 2.

=== Final Stage ===
Semi-final

May 16, 2009	South Korea	3–1	Indonesia
	Malaysia	0–3	China

Final

May 17, 2009	South Korea	0–3	China

South Korea
0
Guangzhou Gymnasium, China
May 17, 2009

China
3

			1	2	3
1	(South Korea) (China)	Lee Yong-dae / Lee Hyo-jung; Zheng Bo / Yu Yang	21; 18	19; 21	16; 21
2	(South Korea) (China)	Park Sung-hwan; Lin Dan	14; 21	18; 21
3	(South Korea) (China)	Jung Jae-sung / Lee Yong-dae; Cai Yun / Fu Haifeng	14; 21	21; 17	19; 21
4	(South Korea) (China)	Hwang Hye-youn; Wang Yihan				not played
5	(South Korea) (China)	Lee Kyung-won / Lee Hyo-jung; Du Jing / Yu Yang				not played

2009 Sudirman Cup winners

China
Seventh title

== Group 2 ==
Promotion playoff
Relegation playoff

=== Group A ===
Team	Pts	Pld	W	L	MF	MA
Thailand	3	3	3	0	11	4
Chinese Taipei	2	3	2	1	9	6
Germany	1	3	1	2	8	7
France	0	3	0	3	2	13

=== Group B ===
Team	Pts	Pld	W	L	MF	MA
Russia	2	3	2	1	8	7
Singapore	2	3	2	1	9	6
Netherlands	1	3	1	2	6	9
Poland	1	3	1	2	7	8

May 10, 2009
Chinese Taipei	4–1	Germany
Thailand	4–1	France
May 12, 2009
Thailand	3–2	Germany
Chinese Taipei	4–1	France
May 13, 2009
Thailand	4–1	Chinese Taipei
Germany	5–0	France

May 11, 2009
Singapore	2–3	Russia
Poland	2–3	Netherlands
May 13, 2009
Poland	3–2	Russia
Singapore	4–1	Netherlands
May 14, 2009
Netherlands	2–3	Russia
Singapore	3–2	Poland

=== Play-offs ===
May 15, 2009	Thailand	3–0	Russia	9th/10th, Thailand is promoted to Group 1.
	Chinese Taipei	3–1	Singapore	11th/12th
	Germany	3–0	Netherlands	13th/14th
	France	0–3	Poland	15th/16th, France is relegated to Group 3.

== Group 3 ==
Promotion playoff
Relegation playoff

=== Group A ===
Team	Pts	Pld	W	L	MF	MA
Bulgaria	2	3	2	1	8	7
United States	2	3	2	1	8	7
Czech Republic	1	3	1	2	7	8
Sweden	1	3	1	2	7	8

=== Group B ===
Team	Pts	Pld	W	L	MF	MA
India	3	3	3	0	14	1
Ukraine	2	3	2	1	6	9
Scotland	1	3	1	2	7	8
Australia	0	3	0	3	3	12

May 10, 2009
United States	3–2	Czech Republic
Sweden	3–2	Bulgaria
May 11, 2009
United States	2–3	Bulgaria
Sweden	2–3	Czech Republic
May 12, 2009
Czech Republic	2–3	Bulgaria
Sweden	2–3	United States

May 11, 2009
India	4–1	Australia
Scotland	2–3	Ukraine
May 12, 2009
India	5–0	Ukraine
Scotland	5–0	Australia
May 13, 2009
India	5–0	Scotland
Ukraine	3–2	Australia

=== Play-offs ===
May 14, 2009	Bulgaria	0–3	India	17th/18th, India is promoted to Group 2
	United States	1–3	Ukraine	19th/20th
	Czech Republic	1–3	Scotland	21st/22nd
	Sweden	3–1	Australia	23rd/24th, Australia is relegated to Group 4

== Group 4 ==
Promotion playoff

=== Group A ===
Team	Pts	Pld	W	L	MF	MA
Switzerland	4	4	4	0	17	3
Philippines	3	4	3	1	14	6
South Africa	2	4	2	2	9	11
Turkey	1	4	1	3	8	12
Luxembourg	0	4	0	4	2	18

=== Group B ===
Team	Pts	Pld	W	L	MF	MA
Lithuania	3	4	3	1	14	6
Portugal	3	4	3	1	14	6
Iceland	3	4	3	1	14	6
Sri Lanka	1	4	1	3	8	12
Mongolia	0	4	0	4	0	20

May 10, 2009
South Africa	1–4	Philippines
Luxembourg	0–5	Turkey
May 11, 2009
Switzerland	4-1	Philippines
South Africa	4-1	Luxembourg
May 12, 2009
Switzerland	4–1	Turkey
Luxembourg	1–4	Philippines
May 13, 2009
Switzerland	5–0	Luxembourg
South Africa	3–2	Turkey
May 14, 2009
Switzerland	4–1	South Africa
Turkey	0–5	Philippines

May 10, 2009
Portugal	2–3	Iceland
Sri Lanka	5–0	Mongolia
May 11, 2009
Sri Lanka	1–4	Portugal
Lithuania	5–0	Mongolia
May 12, 2009
Portugal	5–0	Mongolia
Lithuania	3–2	Iceland
May 13, 2009
Sri Lanka	1–4	Iceland
Lithuania	2–3	Portugal
May 14, 2009
Iceland	5–0	Mongolia
Lithuania	4–1	Sri Lanka

=== Play-offs ===
May 15, 2009	Switzerland	3–1	Lithuania	25th/26th, Switzerland is promoted to Group 3.
	Philippines	3–2	Portugal	27th/28th
	South Africa	0–3	Iceland	29th/30th
	Turkey	1–3	Sri Lanka	31st/32nd
	Luxembourg	3–1	Mongolia	33rd/34th

== Final classification ==
Group 1
Pos	Country
1	China
2	(South Korea) Korea
3	Indonesia
3	Malaysia
5	Denmark
6	England
7	Japan
8	Hong Kong

Group 2
Pos	Country
9	Thailand
10	Russia
11	Chinese Taipei
12	Singapore
13	Germany
14	Netherlands
15	Poland
16	France

Group 3
Pos	Country
17	India
18	Bulgaria
19	Ukraine
20	United States
21	Scotland
22	Czech Republic
23	Sweden
24	Australia

Group 4
Pos	Country
25	Switzerland
26	Lithuania
27	Philippines
28	Portugal
29	Iceland
30	South Africa
31	Sri Lanka
32	Turkey
33	Luxembourg
34	Mongolia

Promoted to higher group
Relegated to lower group
