= Aram Mahmoud =

Dutch badminton player

Personal information
- Born: 15 July 1997 (age 29) Syria
- Years active: 2014–present

Sport
- Country: Syria (until 2015); Netherlands (2018–present)
- Sport: Badminton

Men's singles
- Highest ranking: 135 (18 October 2022)
- BWF profile

Aram Mahmoud (born 15 July 1997) is a Syrian-born Dutch badminton player.

He was selected as one of 29 members of the IOC Refugee Olympic Team (ROT) to compete at 2020 Tokyo Olympics, the first badminton player to participate at the Olympics as part of the ROT. He relocated to the Netherlands from Damascus, Syria in 2015 following unrest in his home country, and has since April 2018 been playing under the Dutch flag. He combines training with studying at the Johan Cruyff Academy and had previously won the Syrian men's championship in 2013 and 2014, as well as the Arab Youth Championship.

== Achievements ==
=== BWF International Challenge/Series (1 title) ===
Men's singles

Year	Tournament	Opponent	Score	Result
2019	Latvia International	(Denmark) Magnus Johannesen	21–9, 21–19	(gold) Winner

BWF International Challenge tournament
BWF International Series tournament
BWF Future Series tournament
