= Mongolia national badminton team =

National badminton team representing Mongolia

Mongolia
- Association: Mongolian Badminton Association (MBA)
- Confederation: BA (Asia)
- President: Batbold Battushig

BWF ranking
- Current ranking: 88 ▲19 (2 January 2024)
- Highest ranking: 70 (13 April 2013)

Sudirman Cup
- Appearances: 2 (first in 2005)
- Best result: Group stage

The Mongolia national badminton team (Mongolian: Монголын бадминтоны шигшээ баг) represents Mongolia in international badminton team competitions. It is controlled by the Mongolian Badminton Association (Mongolian: Монголын Бадминтоны Холбоо; Mongolian script: ᠮᠣᠩᠭᠣᠯ ᠤᠨ ᠪᠠᠳᠮᠢᠨᠲ᠋ᠣᠨ ᠤ ᠬᠣᠯᠪᠣᠭ᠎ᠠ). Although badminton is not a popular sport in the country, the Mongolian team have competed twice in the Sudirman Cup, in 2005 and 2009.

The Mongolian badminton team also competed in the now defunct East Asian Games.

== Competitive record ==
=== Thomas Cup ===
Year	Round	Pos
1949	Did not enter	
1952	Did not enter	
1955	Did not enter	
1958	Did not enter	
1961	Did not enter	
1964	Did not enter	
1967	Did not enter	
1970	Did not enter	
1973	Did not enter	
1976	Did not enter	
1979	Did not enter	
1982	Did not enter	
1984	Did not enter	
1986	Did not enter	
1988	Did not enter	
1990	Did not enter	
1992	Did not enter	
1994	Did not enter	
1996	Did not enter	
1998	Did not enter	
2000	Did not enter	
2002	Did not enter	
2004	Did not enter	
2006	Did not enter	
2008	Did not enter	
2010	Did not enter	
2012	Did not enter	
2014	Did not enter	
2016	Did not enter	
2018	Did not enter	
2020	Did not enter	
2022	Did not enter	
2024	Did not enter	
2026	TBD	
2028	TBD	
2030	TBD	

=== Uber Cup ===
Year	Round	Pos
1957	Did not enter	
1960	Did not enter	
1963	Did not enter	
1966	Did not enter	
1969	Did not enter	
1972	Did not enter	
1975	Did not enter	
1978	Did not enter	
1981	Did not enter	
1984	Did not enter	
1986	Did not enter	
1988	Did not enter	
1990	Did not enter	
1992	Did not enter	
1994	Did not enter	
1996	Did not enter	
1998	Did not enter	
2000	Did not enter	
2002	Did not enter	
2004	Did not enter	
2006	Did not enter	
2008	Did not enter	
2010	Did not enter	
2012	Did not enter	
2014	Did not enter	
2016	Did not enter	
2018	Did not enter	
2020	Did not enter	
2022	Did not enter	
2024	Did not enter	
2026	TBD	
2028	TBD	
2030	TBD	

=== Sudirman Cup ===
Year	Round	Pos
1989	Did not enter	
1991	Did not enter	
1993	Did not enter	
1995	Did not enter	
1997	Did not enter	
1999	Did not enter	
2001	Did not enter	
2003	Did not enter	
2005	Group stage	41st
2007	Did not enter	
2009	Group stage	34th
2011	Did not enter	
2013	Did not enter	
2015	Did not enter	
2017	Did not enter	
2019	Did not enter	
2021	Did not enter	
2023	Did not enter	
2025	Did not enter	
2027	TBD	
2029	TBD	

=== Asian Games ===
==== Men's team ====
Year	Round	Pos
1962	Did not enter	
1966	Did not enter	
1970	Did not enter	
1974	Did not enter	
1978	Did not enter	
1982	Did not enter	
1986	Did not enter	
1990	Did not enter	
1994	Did not enter	
1998	Did not enter	
2002	Did not enter	
2006	Did not enter	
2010	Round of 16	
2014	Did not enter	
2018	Round of 16	
2022	Round of 16	
2026	Round of 16	
2030	TBD	
2034	TBD	
2038	TBD	

==== Women's team ====
Year	Round	Pos
1962	Did not enter	
1966	Did not enter	
1970	Did not enter	
1974	Did not enter	
1978	Did not enter	
1982	Did not enter	
1986	Did not enter	
1990	Did not enter	
1994	Did not enter	
1998	Did not enter	
2002	Did not enter	
2006	Did not enter	
2010	Did not enter	
2014	Did not enter	
2018	Did not enter	
2022	Round of 16	
2026	Round of 16	
2030	TBD	
2034	TBD	
2038	TBD	

=== Asian Team Championships ===
==== Men's team ====
Year	Round	Pos
1962	Did not enter	
1965	Did not enter	
1969	Did not enter	
1971	Did not enter	
1976	Did not enter	
1983	Did not enter	
1985	Did not enter	
1987	Did not enter	
1989	Did not enter	
1993	Did not enter	
2004	Did not enter	
2006	Did not enter	
2008	Did not enter	
2010	Did not enter	
2012	Did not enter	
2016	Did not enter	
2018	Did not enter	
2020	Did not enter	
2022	Did not enter	
2024	Did not enter	
2026	TBD	
2028	TBD	
2030	TBD	

==== Women's team ====
Year	Round	Pos
2004	Did not enter	
2006	Did not enter	
2008	Did not enter	
2010	Did not enter	
2012	Did not enter	
2016	Did not enter	
2018	Did not enter	
2020	Did not enter	
2022	Did not enter	
2024	Did not enter	
2026	TBD	
2028	TBD	
2030	TBD	

==== Mixed team ====
Year	Round	Pos
2017	Did not enter	
2019	Did not enter	
2023	Did not enter	
2025	TBD	
2027	TBD	
2029	TBD	

=== East Asian Games ===
==== Men's team ====
Year	Round	Pos
1993	Did not enter	
1997	Did not enter	
2009	Quarter-finals	6th
2013	Did not enter	

==== Women's team ====
Year	Round	Pos
1993	Did not enter	
1997	Did not enter	
2009	Did not enter	
2013	Did not enter	

**Red border color indicates tournament was held on home soil.

== Junior competitive record ==
=== Suhandinata Cup ===
Year	Round	Pos
2000	Did not enter	
2002	Did not enter	
2004	Did not enter	
2006	Did not enter	
2007	Did not enter	
2008	Did not enter	
2009	Did not enter	
2010	Did not enter	
2011	Did not enter	
2012	Did not enter	
2013	Did not enter	
2014	Group stage	32nd
2015	Did not enter	
2016	Group stage	46th
2017	Group stage	43rd
2018	Group stage	39th
2019	Group stage	43rd
2022	Did not enter	
2023	Did not enter	
2024	Group stage	38th

=== Asian Junior Team Championships ===
==== Boys' team ====
Year	Round	Pos
1997	Did not enter	
1998	Did not enter	
1999	Did not enter	
2000	Did not enter	
2001	Did not enter	
2002	Did not enter	
2004	Did not enter	
2005	Did not enter	

==== Girls' team ====
Year	Round	Pos
1997	Did not enter	
1998	Did not enter	
1999	Did not enter	
2000	Did not enter	
2001	Did not enter	
2002	Did not enter	
2004	Did not enter	
2005	Did not enter	

==== Mixed team ====
Year	Round	Pos
2006	Group stage	
2007	Did not enter	
2008	Did not enter	
2009	Group stage	
2010	Group stage	
2011	Did not enter	
2012	Group stage	
2013	Did not enter	
2014	Did not enter	
2015	Group stage	
2016	Group stage	
2017	Group stage	
2018	Did not enter	
2019	Group stage	
2023	Did not enter	
2024	TBD	
2025	TBD	

**Red border color indicates tournament was held on home soil.

== Players ==
=== Current squad ===
As of 2 January 2024

==== Men's team ====
Name	DoB/Age	Ranking of event		
Name	DoB/Age	MS	MD	XD
Batdavaa Munkhbat	10 September 1995 (age 31)	314	-	-
Sumiyasuren Enkhbat	4 October 2002 (age 23)	622	-	-
Khuvituguldur Byambajav	22 April 1996 (age 30)	1057	328	-
Gerelsukh Jargalsaikhan	2 June 1996 (age 30)	1057	328	-
Yesun-Erdene Munkhbaatar	1 September 2004 (age 22)	1057	-	-

==== Women's team ====
Name	DoB/Age	Ranking of event		
Name	DoB/Age	WS	WD	XD
Ganbaatar Myagmartseren	27 March 2001 (age 25)	461	238	-
Kherlen Darkhanbaatar	4 January 2003 (age 23)	836	238	335
Altangerel Munkhtsetseg	15 June 2006 (age 20)	532	294	-
Khulangoo Baatar	21 April 1994 (age 32)	-	294	335
Munkhnar Lkhagvasuren	12 July 2003 (age 23)	836	-	-
