= Sri Lanka national badminton team =

National badminton team representing Sri Lanka

Sri Lanka
- Association: Sri Lanka Badminton Association (SLBA)
- Confederation: BA (Asia)
- President: Rohan de Silva

BWF ranking
- Current ranking: 66 ▲5 (2 January 2024)
- Highest ranking: 24 (5 October 2017)

Sudirman Cup
- Appearances: 12 (first in 1989)
- Best result: Group stage

Asian Mixed Team Championships
- Appearances: 2 (first in 2017)
- Best result: Group stage

Asian Men's Team Championships
- Appearances: 15 (first in 1962)
- Best result: Quarter-finals (1965)

Asian Women's Team Championships
- Appearances: 6 (first in 2004)
- Best result: Group stage

The Sri Lanka national badminton team (Sinhala: ශ්‍රී ලංකා ජාතික බැඩ්මින්ටන් කණ්ඩායම Shri Lanka Jathika Bædmintan Kandayama; Tamil: இலங்கை தேசிய பூப்பந்து அணி) represents Sri Lanka in international badminton team competitions. The team has had many appearances in the Sudirman Cup with its latest in the 2019 edition, but has never been qualified to the Thomas Cup and the Uber Cup.

In the South Asian Games, the Sri Lanka team has made many final appearances in both men and women's team and have achieved runners-up after losing to India.

== Competitive record ==
=== Thomas Cup ===
Year	Round	Pos
1949	Did not enter	
1952	Did not enter	
1955	Did not qualify	
1958	Did not qualify	
1961	Did not qualify	
1964	Did not qualify	
1967	Did not qualify	
1970	Did not qualify	
1973	Did not qualify	
1976	Did not qualify	
1979	Did not qualify	
1982	Did not qualify	
1984	Did not qualify	
1986	Did not qualify	
1988	Did not qualify	
1990	Did not qualify	
1992	Did not qualify	
1994	Did not qualify	
1996	Did not qualify	
1998	Did not qualify	
2000	Did not qualify	
2002	Did not qualify	
2004	Did not qualify	
2006	Did not qualify	
2008	Did not qualify	
2010	Did not qualify	
2012	Did not qualify	
2014	Did not qualify	
2016	Did not qualify	
2018	Did not enter	
2020	Did not enter	
2022	Did not enter	
2024	TBD	
2026	TBD	
2028	TBD	
2030	TBD	

=== Uber Cup ===
Year	Round	Pos
1957	Did not enter	
1960	Did not enter	
1963	Did not enter	
1966	Did not enter	
1969	Did not enter	
1972	Did not enter	
1975	Did not enter	
1978	Did not enter	
1981	Did not enter	
1984	Did not qualify	
1986	Did not qualify	
1988	Did not qualify	
1990	Did not qualify	
1992	Did not qualify	
1994	Did not qualify	
1996	Did not qualify	
1998	Did not qualify	
2000	Did not qualify	
2002	Did not qualify	
2004	Did not enter	
2006	Did not enter	
2008	Did not qualify	
2010	Did not qualify	
2012	Did not qualify	
2014	Did not qualify	
2016	Did not qualify	
2018	Did not enter	
2020	Did not enter	
2022	Did not enter	
2024	TBD	
2026	TBD	
2028	TBD	
2030	TBD	

=== Sudirman Cup ===
Year	Round	Pos
1989	Group stage	24th
1991	Did not enter	
1993	Did not enter	
1995	Did not enter	
1997	Group stage	39th
1999	Group stage	40th
2001	Did not enter	
2003	Did not enter	
2005	Group stage	39th
2007	Group stage	36th
2009	Group stage	31st
2011	Group stage	29th
2013	Group stage	27th
2015	Group stage	30th
2017	Group stage	21st
2019	Group stage	21st
2021	Did not enter	
2023	Did not enter	
2025	TBD	
2027	TBD	
2029	TBD	

=== WBF World Championships ===
==== Men's team ====
Year	Round	Pos
1979	Group stage	

==== Women's team ====
Year	Round	Pos
1979	Did not enter	

=== Commonwealth Games ===
==== Men's team ====
Year	Round	Pos
1998	Group stage	

==== Women's team ====
Year	Round	Pos
1998	Group stage	

==== Mixed team ====
Year	Round	Pos
1978	Did not enter	
1982	Did not enter	
1986	Did not enter	
1990	Did not enter	
1994	Did not enter	
2002	Did not enter	
2006	Quarter-finals	
2010	Group stage	
2014	Quarter-finals	
2018	Group stage	
2022	Quarter-finals	
2026	TBD	

=== GANEFO ===
==== Men's team ====
Year	Round	Pos
1963	Fourth place	4th
1966	Group stage	

==== Women's team ====
Year	Round	Pos
1963	Did not enter	
1966	Fourth place	4th

=== Asian Games ===
==== Men's team ====
Year	Round	Pos
1962	Did not enter	
1966	Quarter-finals	
1970	Did not enter	
1974	Did not enter	
1978	Did not enter	
1982	Did not enter	
1986	Did not enter	
1990	Did not enter	
1994	Did not enter	
1998	Did not enter	
2002	Did not enter	
2006	Did not enter	
2010	Did not enter	
2014	Did not enter	
2018	Did not enter	
2022	Did not enter	
2026	TBD	
2030	TBD	
2034	TBD	
2038	TBD	

==== Women's team ====
Year	Round	Pos
1962	Did not enter	
1966	Did not enter	
1970	Did not enter	
1974	Did not enter	
1978	Did not enter	
1982	Did not enter	
1986	Did not enter	
1990	Did not enter	
1994	Did not enter	
1998	Did not enter	
2002	Did not enter	
2006	Did not enter	
2010	Did not enter	
2014	Did not enter	
2018	Did not enter	
2022	Did not enter	
2026	TBD	
2030	TBD	
2034	TBD	
2038	TBD	

=== Asian Team Championships ===
==== Men's team ====
Year	Round	Pos
1962	Round of 16	
1965	Quarter-finals	
1969	Round of 16	
1971	Did not enter	
1976	Round of 16	
1983	Round of 16	
1985	Round of 16	
1987	Group stage	
1989	Group stage	
1993	Group stage	
2004	Group stage	
2006	Group stage	
2008	Group stage	
2010	Group stage	
2012	Group stage	
2016	Group stage	
2018	Did not enter	
2020	Did not enter	
2022	Did not enter	
2024	TBD	
2026	TBD	
2028	TBD	
2030	TBD	

==== Women's team ====
Year	Round	Pos
2004	Group stage	
2006	Group stage	
2008	Group stage	
2010	Group stage	
2012	Group stage	
2016	Group stage	
2018	Did not enter	
2020	Did not enter	
2022	Did not enter	
2024	TBD	
2026	TBD	
2028	TBD	
2030	TBD	

==== Mixed team ====
Year	Round	Pos
2017	Group stage	
2019	Group stage	
2023	Did not enter	
2025	TBD	
2027	TBD	
2029	TBD	

=== South Asian Games ===
==== Men's team ====
Year	Round	Pos
2004	Third place	3rd
2006	Runners-up	2nd
2010	Runners-up	2nd
2016	Runners-up	2nd
2019	Runners-up	2nd
2024	TBD	

==== Women's team ====
Year	Round	Pos
2004	Runners-up	2nd
2006	Runners-up	2nd
2010	Runners-up	2nd
2016	Runners-up	2nd
2019	Runners-up	2nd
2024	TBD	

=== FISU World University Games ===
==== Mixed team ====
Year	Round	Pos
2007	Did not enter	
2011	Group stage	
2013	Group stage	
2015	Group stage	
2017	Group stage	
2021	Did not enter	
2025	TBD	

=== World University Team Championships ===
==== Mixed team ====
Year	Round	Pos
2008	Did not enter	
2010	Did not enter	
2012	Group stage	
2014	Did not enter	
2016	Group stage	
2018	Group stage	

**Red border color indicates tournament was held on home soil.

== Junior competitive record ==
=== Suhandinata Cup ===
Year	Round	Pos
2000	Did not enter	
2002	Did not enter	
2004	Did not enter	
2006	Did not enter	
2007	Did not enter	
2008	Group stage	18th
2009	Group stage	20th
2010	Did not enter	
2011	Did not enter	
2012	Group stage	24th
2013	Group stage	21st
2014	Group stage	25th
2015	Did not enter	
2016	Group stage	36th
2017	Group stage	37th
2018	Group stage	16th
2019	Group stage	26th
2020	Cancelled because of COVID-19 pandemic	
2021	Cancelled because of COVID-19 pandemic	
2022	Group stage	20th
2023	Did not enter	
2024	Group stage	19th
2025	Group stage	12th of 36
2026	Group stage	25th of 47

=== Commonwealth Youth Games ===
==== Mixed team ====
Year	Round	Pos
2004	Did not enter	

=== Asian Junior Team Championships ===
==== Boys' team ====
Year	Round	Pos
1997	Round of 16	
1998	Round of 16	
1999	Round of 16	
2000	Round of 16	
2001	Did not enter	
2002	Did not enter	
2004	Round of 16	
2005	Round of 16	

==== Girls' team ====
Year	Round	Pos
1997	Quarter-finals	
1998	Quarter-finals	
1999	Round of 16	
2000	Quarter-finals	
2001	Did not enter	
2002	Round of 16	
2004	Round of 16	
2005	Round of 16	

==== Mixed team ====
Year	Round	Pos
2006	Round of 16	
2007	Round of 16	
2008	Group stage	
2009	Group stage	
2010	Group stage	
2011	Group stage	
2012	Group stage	
2013	Group stage	
2014	Group stage	
2015	Group stage	
2016	Group stage	
2017	Did not enter	
2018	Group stage	
2019	Group stage	
2023	Did not enter	
2024	Did not enter	
2025	Group stage	15th
2026	Group stage	13th

=== South Asian Junior Team Championships ===
==== Mixed team ====
Year	Round	Pos
2019	Runners-up	2nd

**Red border color indicates tournament was held on home soil.

== Players ==
=== Current squad ===
As of 2 January 2024

==== Men's team ====
Name	DoB/Age	Ranking of event		
Name	DoB/Age	MS	MD	XD
Viren Nettasinghe	8 November 1998 (age 27)	82	189	-
Dumindu Abeywickrama	5 March 2003 (age 23)	186	-	-
Rasindu Hendahewa	25 March 2002 (age 24)	270	-	-
Aashinsa Herath	12 December 2005 (age 20)	279	-	-
Chamath Dias	26 March 2001 (age 25)	1561	-	265
Buwaneka Goonethilleka	8 May 1996 (age 30)	313	189	-
Oshamika Karunarathne	16 May 2003 (age 23)	-	352	-
Thulith Palliyaguru	15 August 2002 (age 24)	-	352	-

==== Women's team ====
Name	DoB/Age	Ranking of event		
Name	DoB/Age	WS	WD	XD
Suhasni Vidanage	6 June 2003 (age 23)	-	-	-
Ranithma Liyanage	22 March 2007 (age 19)	267	-	-
Rashmi Mudalige	5 July 2006 (age 20)	333	-	-
Dasithma Jayathilaka	18 January 2007 (age 19)	990	-	-
Thilini Hendahewa	18 September 1996 (age 30)	470	-	-
Kavidi Sirimannage	27 September 1995 (age 31)	-	-	-
Natasha Gunasekera	23 May 2005 (age 21)	-	-	265
Hasara Wijayarathne	9 June 1999 (age 27)	1243	-	-

=== Previous squads ===
==== Sudirman Cup ====
- 2019
