= 2019 Sudirman Cup knockout stage =

The knockout stage of the 2019 Sudirman Cup was the final stage of the competition, following the group stage. It began on 23 May with the quarter-finals and ended on 26 May with the final match of the tournament, held at Guangxi Sports Center in Nanning, China. For Group 1, the top two teams from each group (8 in total) advanced to the final knockout stage to compete in a single-elimination tournament. Teams from group 2 and 3 (16 in total) play round robin in respective subgroup and advanced to classification round to determine the overall placings, meanwhile teams from group 4 play in a single round robin format for final placings.

== Qualified teams ==
=== Group 1 ===
Group	Winners	Runners-up
A	Japan	Thailand
B	Indonesia	Denmark
C	South Korea	Chinese Taipei
D	China	Malaysia

=== Group 2 ===
Group	Winners	Runners-up	Third place	Fourth place
A	France	Netherlands	Vietnam	United States
B	Canada	Germany	Singapore	Israel

=== Group 3 ===
Group	Winners	Runners-up	Third place	Fourth place
A	Ireland	Australia	New Zealand	Nepal
B	Sri Lanka	Switzerland	Slovakia	Lithuania

== Bracket ==
=== Group 1 ===
The draw for the quarterfinals was held after the completion of the final matches in the group stage on 22 May 2019.

Quarterfinals
23 May – Nanning
China	3
Denmark	1
23 May – Nanning
South Korea	1
Thailand	3
24 May – Nanning
Chinese Taipei	2
Indonesia	3
24 May – Nanning
Malaysia	0
Japan	3

Semifinals
25 May – Nanning
China	3
Thailand	0
25 May – Nanning
Indonesia	1
Japan	3

Final
26 May – Nanning
China	3
Japan	0

=== Group 2 ===
Thirteenth place match
France	1
Canada	3

Fifteenth place match
Netherlands	3
Germany	2

Seventeenth place match
Vietnam	0
Singapore	3

Nineteenth place match
United States	3
Israel	1

=== Group 3 ===
Twenty-first place match
Ireland	2
Sri Lanka	3

Twenty-third place match
Australia	2
Switzerland	3

Twenty-fifth place match
New Zealand	2
Slovakia	3

Twenty-seventh place match
Nepal	1
Lithuania	3

== Classification round ==
=== Twenty-seventh place match: Nepal vs Lithuania ===
Nepal
1
Guangxi Sports Centre, Court 5
24 May 2019, 18:00 UTC+8

Lithuania
3

			1	2	3
1	(Nepal) (Lithuania)	Dipesh Dhami / Amita Giri; Povilas Bartušis / Gerda Voitechovskaja	10; 21	16; 21
2	(Nepal) (Lithuania)	Nangsal Tamang; Vytaute Fomkinaite	15; 21	11; 21
3	(Nepal) (Lithuania)	Ratnajit Tamang; Mark Sames	21; 13	21; 13
4	(Nepal) (Lithuania)	Amita Giri / Nangsal Tamang; Vytaute Fomkinaite / Gerda Voitechovskaja	10; 21	8; 21
5	(Nepal) (Lithuania)	Dipesh Dhami / Ratnajit Tamang; Povilas Bartušis / Mark Sames				not played

=== Twenty-fifth place match: New Zealand vs Slovakia ===
New Zealand
2
Guangxi Sports Centre, Court 3
24 May 2019, 18:00 UTC+8

Slovakia
3

			1	2	3
1	(New Zealand) (Slovakia)	Oliver Leydon-Davis / Anona Pak; Jakub Horak / Mia Tarcalova	21; 14	21; 13
2	(New Zealand) (Slovakia)	Abhinav Manota; Milan Dratva	15; 21	17; 21
3	(New Zealand) (Slovakia)	Sally Fu; Martina Repiská	10; 21	17; 21
4	(New Zealand) (Slovakia)	Oliver Leydon-Davis / Dacmen Vong; Andrej Antoska / Juraj Vachalek	21; 13	27; 29	21; 16
5	(New Zealand) (Slovakia)	Anona Pak / Alyssa Tagle; Martina Repiská / Mia Tarcalova	21; 12	18; 21	22; 24

=== Twenty-third place match: Australia vs Switzerland ===
Australia
2
Guangxi Sports Centre, Court 4
24 May 2019, 18:00 UTC+8

Switzerland
3

			1	2	3
1	(Australia) (Switzerland)	Simon Leung / Gronya Somerville; Oliver Schaller / Céline Burkart	12; 21	10; 21
2	(Australia) (Switzerland)	Louisa Ma; Ronja Stern	22; 20	20; 22	21; 15
3	(Australia) (Switzerland)	Ashwant Gobinathan; Christian Kirchmayr	23; 25	8; 21
4	(Australia) (Switzerland)	Setyana Mapasa / Gronya Somerville; Sabrina Jaquet / Jenjira Stadelmann	21; 8	21; 14
5	(Australia) (Switzerland)	Sawan Serasinghe / Eric Vuong; Tobias Kuenzi / Oliver Schaller	21; 17	17; 21	20; 22

=== Twenty-first place match: Ireland vs Sri Lanka ===
Ireland
2
Guangxi Sports Centre, Court 2
24 May 2019, 18:00 UTC+8

Sri Lanka
3

			1	2	3
1	(Republic of Ireland) (Sri Lanka)	Sam Magee / Chloe Magee; Sachin Dias / Thilini Pramodika Hendahewa	20; 22	21; 16	21; 17
2	(Republic of Ireland) (Sri Lanka)	Nhat Nguyen; Dinuka Karunaratne	21; 12	21; 18
3	(Republic of Ireland) (Sri Lanka)	Kate Frost; Kavidi Sirimannage	12; 21	7; 21
4	(Republic of Ireland) (Sri Lanka)	Sam Magee / Nhat Nguyen; Sachin Dias / Buwaneka Goonethilleka	21; 17	16; 21	11; 21
5	(Republic of Ireland) (Sri Lanka)	Rachael Darragh / Chloe Magee; Thilini Pramodika Hendahewa / Kavidi Sirimannage	15; 21	24; 22	17; 21

=== Nineteenth place match: United States vs Israel ===
United States
3
Guangxi Sports Centre, Court 3
23 May 2019, 11:00 UTC+8

Israel
1

			1	2	3
1	(United States) (Israel)	Iris Wang; Ksenia Polikarpova	21; 11	21; 13
2	(United States) (Israel)	Timothy Lam; Misha Zilberman	15; 21	12; 21
3	(United States) (Israel)	Paula Lynn Obañana / Iris Wang; Margaret Lurie / Yuval Pugach	21; 10	21; 4
4	(United States) (Israel)	Phillip Chew / Ryan Chew; May Bar Netzer / Ariel Shainski	21; 13	21; 15
5	(United States) (Israel)	Howard Shu / Paula Lynn Obañana; Misha Zilberman / Ksenia Polikarpova				not played

=== Seventeenth place match: Vietnam vs Singapore ===
Vietnam
0
Guangxi Sports Centre, Court 2
23 May 2019, 11:00 UTC+8

Singapore
3

			1	2	3
1	(Vietnam) (Singapore)	Phạm Cao Cường / Phạm Hồng Nam; Loh Kean Hean / Toh Han Zhuo	16; 21	14; 21
2	(Vietnam) (Singapore)	Nguyễn Thùy Linh; Yeo Jia Min	8; 21	21; 18	15; 21
3	(Vietnam) (Singapore)	Nguyễn Tiến Minh; Loh Kean Yew	21; 16	18; 21	21; 23
4	(Vietnam) (Singapore)	Đinh Thị Phương Hồng / Vũ Thị Trang; Jin Yujia / Crystal Wong				not played
5	(Vietnam) (Singapore)	Phạm Hồng Nam / Phạm Như Thảo; Danny Bawa Chrisnanta / Tan Wei Han				not played

=== Fifteenth place match: Netherlands vs Germany ===
Netherlands
3
Guangxi Sports Centre, Court 1
23 May 2019, 11:00 UTC+8

Germany
2

			1	2	3
1	(Netherlands) (Germany)	Jacco Arends / Ruben Jille; Mark Lamsfuß / Marvin Emil Seidel	13; 21	14; 21
2	(Netherlands) (Germany)	Gayle Mahulette; Fabienne Deprez	18; 21	21; 18	13; 21
3	(Netherlands) (Germany)	Mark Caljouw; Alexander Roovers	21; 13	21; 9
4	(Netherlands) (Germany)	Gayle Mahulette / Cheryl Seinen; Linda Efler / Lara Käpplein	18; 21	21; 10	21; 17
5	(Netherlands) (Germany)	Robin Tabeling / Selena Piek; Marvin Emil Seidel / Isabel Herttrich	16; 21	21; 17	21; 11

=== Thirteenth place match: France vs Canada ===
France
1
Guangxi Sports Centre, Court 1
24 May 2019, 18:00 UTC+8

Canada
3

			1	2	3
1	(France) (Canada)	Thom Gicquel / Ronan Labar; Jason Ho-shue / Nyl Yakura	21; 17	21; 16
2	(France) (Canada)	Yaëlle Hoyaux; Michelle Li	7; 21	4; 21
3	(France) (Canada)	Brice Leverdez; Brian Yang	14; 21	12; 21
4	(France) (Canada)	Émilie Lefel / Anne Tran; Rachel Honderich / Kristen Tsai	11; 21	17; 21
5	(France) (Canada)	Thom Gicquel / Delphine Delrue; Joshua Hurlburt-Yu / Josephine Wu				not played

== Quarter-finals ==
=== China vs Denmark ===
China
3
Guangxi Sports Centre, Court 1
23 May 2019, 18:00 UTC+8

Denmark
1

			1	2	3
1	(China) (Denmark)	Zheng Siwei / Huang Yaqiong; Mathias Christiansen / Sara Thygesen	19; 21	21; 11	21; 13
2	(China) (Denmark)	Chen Long; Viktor Axelsen	11; 21	18; 21
3	(China) (Denmark)	Li Junhui / Liu Yuchen; Kim Astrup / Anders Skaarup Rasmussen	21; 18	21; 16
4	(China) (Denmark)	Chen Yufei; Mia Blichfeldt	21; 16	21; 17
5	(China) (Denmark)	Chen Qingchen / Jia Yifan; Maiken Fruergaard / Sara Thygesen				not played

=== South Korea vs Thailand ===
South Korea
1
Guangxi Sports Centre, Court 2
23 May 2019, 18:00 UTC+8

Thailand
3

			1	2	3
1	(South Korea) (Thailand)	Seo Seung-jae / Chae Yoo-jung; Dechapol Puavaranukroh / Sapsiree Taerattanachai	18; 21	18; 21
2	(South Korea) (Thailand)	Heo Kwang-hee; Kantaphon Wangcharoen	17; 21	17; 21
3	(South Korea) (Thailand)	Kang Min-hyuk / Kim Won-ho; Tinn Isriyanet / Kittinupong Kedren	19; 21	21; 17	21; 14
4	(South Korea) (Thailand)	An Se-young; Ratchanok Intanon	15; 21	17; 21
5	(South Korea) (Thailand)	Chang Ye-na / Kong Hee-yong; Jongkolphan Kititharakul / Sapsiree Taerattanachai				not played

=== Chinese Taipei vs Indonesia ===
Chinese Taipei
2
Guangxi Sports Centre, Court 2
24 May 2019, 11:00 UTC+8

Indonesia
3

			1	2	3
1	(Chinese Taipei) (Indonesia)	Lee Yang / Wang Chi-lin; Marcus Fernaldi Gideon / Kevin Sanjaya Sukamuljo	17; 21	17; 21
2	(Chinese Taipei) (Indonesia)	Tai Tzu-ying; Gregoria Mariska Tunjung	21; 16	21; 14
3	(Chinese Taipei) (Indonesia)	Chou Tien-chen; Jonatan Christie	21; 11	21; 13
4	(Chinese Taipei) (Indonesia)	Pai Yu-po / Wu Ti-jung; Greysia Polii / Apriyani Rahayu	13; 21	7; 21
5	(Chinese Taipei) (Indonesia)	Wang Chi-lin / Hsieh Pei-shan; Praveen Jordan / Melati Daeva Oktavianti	17; 21	15; 21

=== Malaysia vs Japan ===
Malaysia
0
Guangxi Sports Centre, Court 1
24 May 2019, 11:00 UTC+8

Japan
3

			1	2	3
1	(Malaysia) (Japan)	Ong Yew Sin / Teo Ee Yi; Takeshi Kamura / Keigo Sonoda	21; 13	24; 26	21; 23
2	(Malaysia) (Japan)	Soniia Cheah Su Ya; Nozomi Okuhara	16; 21	13; 21
3	(Malaysia) (Japan)	Lee Zii Jia; Kento Momota	18; 21	16; 21
4	(Malaysia) (Japan)	Chow Mei Kuan / Lee Meng Yean; Mayu Matsumoto / Wakana Nagahara				not played
5	(Malaysia) (Japan)	Tan Kian Meng / Lai Pei Jing; Yuta Watanabe / Arisa Higashino				not played

== Semi-finals ==
=== China vs Thailand ===
China
3
Guangxi Sports Centre, Court 1
25 May 2019, 11:00 UTC+8

Thailand
0

			1	2	3
1	(China) (Thailand)	Zheng Siwei / Huang Yaqiong; Dechapol Puavaranukroh / Sapsiree Taerattanachai	21; 18	21; 7
2	(China) (Thailand)	Shi Yuqi; Kantaphon Wangcharoen	21; 15	26; 24
3	(China) (Thailand)	Li Junhui / Liu Yuchen; Tinn Isriyanet / Kittinupong Kedren	21; 14	21; 17
4	(China) (Thailand)	Chen Yufei; Ratchanok Intanon				not played
5	(China) (Thailand)	Chen Qingchen / Jia Yifan; Puttita Supajirakul / Sapsiree Taerattanachai				not played

=== Indonesia vs Japan ===
Indonesia
1
Guangxi Sports Centre, Court 1
25 May 2019, 18:00 UTC+8

Japan
3

			1	2	3
1	(Indonesia) (Japan)	Marcus Fernaldi Gideon / Kevin Sanjaya Sukamuljo; Takeshi Kamura / Keigo Sonoda	21; 14	21; 18
2	(Indonesia) (Japan)	Gregoria Mariska Tunjung; Akane Yamaguchi	13; 21	13; 21
3	(Indonesia) (Japan)	Anthony Sinisuka Ginting; Kento Momota	17; 21	19; 21
4	(Indonesia) (Japan)	Greysia Polii / Apriyani Rahayu; Mayu Matsumoto / Wakana Nagahara	15; 21	17; 21
5	(Indonesia) (Japan)	Praveen Jordan / Melati Daeva Oktavianti; Yuta Watanabe / Arisa Higashino				not played

== Final ==
=== China vs Japan ===
China
3
Guangxi Sports Centre, Court 1
26 May 2019, 13:00 UTC+8

Japan
0

			1	2	3
1	(China) (Japan)	Li Junhui / Liu Yuchen; Hiroyuki Endo / Yuta Watanabe	21; 18	21; 10
2	(China) (Japan)	Chen Yufei; Akane Yamaguchi	17; 21	21; 16	21; 17
3	(China) (Japan)	Shi Yuqi; Kento Momota	15; 21	21; 5	21; 11
4	(China) (Japan)	Chen Qingchen / Jia Yifan; Mayu Matsumoto / Wakana Nagahara				not played
5	(China) (Japan)	Zheng Siwei / Huang Yaqiong; Yuta Watanabe / Arisa Higashino				not played
