= 2019 Sudirman Cup group stage =

The group stage of the 2019 Sudirman Cup was the first stage of the competition. It was held at Guangxi Sports Center in Nanning, China, from 19 to 22 May. For Group 1, the top two teams from each group (8 in total) advanced to the final knockout stage to compete in a single-elimination tournament. Teams from group 2 and 3 (16 in total) play round robin in respective subgroup and advanced to classification round to determine the overall placings, meanwhile teams from group 4 play in a single round robin format for final placings.

== Seeding ==
The seeding for 32 teams competing in the tournament were announced on 12 March 2019. It was based on aggregated points from the best players in the world ranking as of 5 March 2019. The tournament was divided into four groups, with twelve teams in the elite group competing for the title. Eight teams were seeded into second and third groups and four remaining teams were seeded into fourth group.

On the day of the draw, it was announced that the original list of 32 teams was pared down to 31, with Kenya withdrawing from the tournament. The 31 participating teams were divided into four groups, with Group 1 consisting of the 12 teams that will compete for the title. Group 2 and Group 3 (eight teams each) along with Group 4 (three teams) will fight for overall placings. The draw was held on 19 March 2019.

Group 1	Group 2	Group 3	Group 4
1. Japan; 2. China; 3. Indonesia; 4. Chinese Taipei; 5. South Korea; 6. Denmark; 7. Thailand; 8. India; 9. Malaysia; 10. England; 11. Hong Kong; 12. Russia	13. Netherlands; 14. Germany; 15. Canada; 16. France; 17. United States; 18. Singapore; 19. Vietnam; 20. Israel	21. Ireland; 22. Switzerland; 23. Australia; 24. Sri Lanka; 25. Slovakia; 26. New Zealand; 27. Nepal; 28. Lithuania	29. Macau; 30. Kazakhstan; 31. ~~Kenya~~; 32. Greenland

=== Group composition ===
Group 1
Group 1A	Group 1B	Group 1C	Group 1D
Japan; Thailand; Russia	Indonesia; Denmark; England	Chinese Taipei; South Korea; Hong Kong	China; India; Malaysia

Group 2		Group 3		Group 4
Group 2A	Group 2B	Group 3A	Group 3B	Group 4
Netherlands; France; United States; Vietnam	Germany; Canada; Singapore; Israel	Ireland; Australia; New Zealand; Nepal	Switzerland; Sri Lanka; Slovakia; Lithuania	Macau; Kazakhstan; Greenland

== Group 1A ==
Pos	Team	Pld	W	L	MF	MA	MD	GF	GA	GD	PF	PA	PD	Pts	Qualification
1	Japan	2	2	0	7	3	+4	15	6	+9	419	319	+100	2	Advance to Quarterfinals
2	Thailand	2	1	1	4	6	−2	9	13	−4	368	403	−35	1	Advance to Quarterfinals
3	Russia	2	0	2	4	6	−2	8	13	−5	332	397	−65	0	

Source: TS
Rules for classification: Tiebreakers

=== Japan vs Russia ===
Japan
3
Guangxi Sports Centre, Court 1
20 May 2019, 11:00 UTC+8

Russia
2

			1	2	3
1	(Japan) (Russia)	Takuro Hoki / Wakana Nagahara; Rodion Alimov / Alina Davletova	21; 10	21; 15
2	(Japan) (Russia)	Kenta Nishimoto; Vladimir Malkov	18; 21	17; 21
3	(Japan) (Russia)	Hiroyuki Endo / Yuta Watanabe; Vladimir Ivanov / Ivan Sozonov	19; 21	16; 21
4	(Japan) (Russia)	Nozomi Okuhara; Natalia Perminova	21; 6	21; 16
5	(Japan) (Russia)	Yuki Fukushima / Sayaka Hirota; Ekaterina Bolotova / Alina Davletova	21; 5	21; 16

=== Thailand vs Russia ===
Thailand
3
Guangxi Sports Centre, Court 1
21 May 2019, 18:00 UTC+8

Russia
2

			1	2	3
1	(Thailand) (Russia)	Kittinupong Kedren / Nipitphon Phuangphuapet; Vladimir Ivanov / Ivan Sozonov	11; 21	21; 19	15; 21
2	(Thailand) (Russia)	Ratchanok Intanon; Evgeniya Kosetskaya	21; 7	21; 16
3	(Thailand) (Russia)	Kantaphon Wangcharoen; Vladimir Malkov	13; 21	15; 21
4	(Thailand) (Russia)	Jongkolphan Kititharakul / Rawinda Prajongjai; Ekaterina Bolotova / Alina Davletova	21; 19	21; 14
5	(Thailand) (Russia)	Dechapol Puavaranukroh / Sapsiree Taerattanachai; Evgenij Dremin / Evgenia Dimova	21; 10	21; 11

=== Japan vs Thailand ===
Japan
4
Guangxi Sports Centre, Court 2
22 May 2019, 18:00 UTC+8

Thailand
1

			1	2	3
1	(Japan) (Thailand)	Takeshi Kamura / Keigo Sonoda; Kittinupong Kedren / Nipitphon Phuangphuapet	21; 14	21; 13
2	(Japan) (Thailand)	Akane Yamaguchi; Pornpawee Chochuwong	21; 9	14; 21	20; 22
3	(Japan) (Thailand)	Kento Momota; Sitthikom Thammasin	21; 19	21; 10
4	(Japan) (Thailand)	Misaki Matsutomo / Ayaka Takahashi; Jongkolphan Kititharakul / Rawinda Prajongjai	21; 17	21; 17
5	(Japan) (Thailand)	Yuta Watanabe / Arisa Higashino; Dechapol Puavaranukroh / Savitree Amitrapai	21; 11	21; 14

== Group 1B ==
Pos	Team	Pld	W	L	MF	MA	MD	GF	GA	GD	PF	PA	PD	Pts	Qualification
1	Indonesia	2	1	1	6	4	+2	12	8	+4	373	338	+35	1	Advance to Quarterfinals
2	Denmark	2	1	1	5	5	0	13	12	+1	467	440	+27	1	Advance to Quarterfinals
3	England	2	1	1	4	6	−2	10	15	−5	417	479	−62	1	

Source: TS
Rules for classification: Tiebreakers

=== Indonesia vs England ===
Indonesia
4
Guangxi Sports Centre, Court 1
19 May 2019, 11:00 UTC+8

England
1

			1	2	3
1	(Indonesia) (England)	Marcus Fernaldi Gideon / Kevin Sanjaya Sukamuljo; Marcus Ellis / Chris Langridge	21; 9	21; 18
2	(Indonesia) (England)	Gregoria Mariska Tunjung; Abigail Holden	21; 10	21; 13
3	(Indonesia) (England)	Anthony Sinisuka Ginting; Toby Penty	21; 9	21; 12
4	(Indonesia) (England)	Greysia Polii / Apriyani Rahayu; Chloe Birch / Lauren Smith	21; 16	21; 18
5	(Indonesia) (England)	Praveen Jordan / Melati Daeva Oktavianti; Chris Adcock / Gabby Adcock	17; 21	18; 21

=== Denmark vs England ===
Denmark
2
Guangxi Sports Centre, Court 1
20 May 2019, 18:00 UTC+8

England
3

			1	2	3
1	(Denmark) (England)	Mathias Christiansen / Sara Thygesen; Marcus Ellis / Lauren Smith	21; 15	20; 22	17; 21
2	(Denmark) (England)	Viktor Axelsen; Toby Penty	21; 11	13; 21	21; 17
3	(Denmark) (England)	Mia Blichfeldt; Chloe Birch	21; 11	18; 21	21; 12
4	(Denmark) (England)	Kim Astrup / Anders Skaarup Rasmussen; Marcus Ellis / Chris Langridge	21; 16	19; 21	19; 21
5	(Denmark) (England)	Maiken Fruergaard / Sara Thygesen; Chloe Birch / Lauren Smith	12; 21	21; 19	11; 21

=== Indonesia vs Denmark ===
Indonesia
2
Guangxi Sports Centre, Court 1
22 May 2019, 18:00 UTC+8

Denmark
3

			1	2	3
1	(Indonesia) (Denmark)	Hafiz Faizal / Gloria Emanuelle Widjaja; Mathias Christiansen / Sara Thygesen	17; 21	11; 21
2	(Indonesia) (Denmark)	Anthony Sinisuka Ginting; Viktor Axelsen	9; 21	16; 21
3	(Indonesia) (Denmark)	Mohammad Ahsan / Hendra Setiawan; Kim Astrup / Mathias Boe	22; 20	21; 14
4	(Indonesia) (Denmark)	Fitriani; Mia Blichfeldt	13; 21	19; 21
5	(Indonesia) (Denmark)	Greysia Polii / Apriyani Rahayu; Maiken Fruergaard / Sara Thygesen	21; 18	21; 13

== Group 1C ==
Pos	Team	Pld	W	L	MF	MA	MD	GF	GA	GD	PF	PA	PD	Pts	Qualification
1	South Korea	2	2	0	7	3	+4	15	7	+8	422	349	+73	2	Advance to Quarterfinals
2	Chinese Taipei	2	1	1	5	5	0	12	11	+1	415	407	+8	1	Advance to Quarterfinals
3	Hong Kong	2	0	2	3	7	−4	7	16	−9	364	445	−81	0	

Source: TS
Rules for classification: Tiebreakers

=== Chinese Taipei vs Hong Kong ===
Chinese Taipei
3
Guangxi Sports Centre, Court 2
19 May 2019, 18:00 UTC+8

Hong Kong
2

			1	2	3
1	(Chinese Taipei) (Hong Kong)	Liao Min-chun / Su Ching-heng; Yonny Chung / Tam Chun Hei	21; 14	21; 17
2	(Chinese Taipei) (Hong Kong)	Tai Tzu-ying; Cheung Ngan Yi	18; 21	21; 19	21; 8
3	(Chinese Taipei) (Hong Kong)	Chou Tien-chen; Ng Ka Long	21; 15	21; 15
4	(Chinese Taipei) (Hong Kong)	Pai Yu-po / Wu Ti-jung; Ng Wing Yung / Yeung Nga Ting	14; 21	11; 21
5	(Chinese Taipei) (Hong Kong)	Wang Chi-lin / Chang Ching-hui; Tang Chun Man / Tse Ying Suet	21; 16	16; 21	14; 21

=== South Korea vs Hong Kong ===
South Korea
4
Guangxi Sports Centre, Court 2
20 May 2019, 18:00 UTC+8

Hong Kong
1

			1	2	3
1	(South Korea) (Hong Kong)	Seo Seung-jae / Chae Yoo-jung; Tang Chun Man / Ng Tsz Yau	21; 11	21; 16
2	(South Korea) (Hong Kong)	An Se-young; Cheung Ngan Yi	21; 8	21; 12
3	(South Korea) (Hong Kong)	Heo Kwang-hee; Ng Ka Long	19; 21	21; 17	16; 21
4	(South Korea) (Hong Kong)	Kim So-yeong / Kong Hee-yong; Ng Tsz Yau / Yuen Sin Ying	21; 4	21; 12
5	(South Korea) (Hong Kong)	Kang Min-hyuk / Kim Won-ho; Or Chin Chung / Tang Chun Man	22; 20	21; 12

=== Chinese Taipei vs South Korea ===
Chinese Taipei
2
Guangxi Sports Centre, Court 2
22 May 2019, 11:00 UTC+8

South Korea
3

			1	2	3
1	(Chinese Taipei) (South Korea)	Lee Yang / Wang Chi-lin; Choi Sol-gyu / Seo Seung-jae	21; 15	21; 13
2	(Chinese Taipei) (South Korea)	Tai Tzu-ying; An Se-young	21; 14	18; 21	16; 21
3	(Chinese Taipei) (South Korea)	Chou Tien-chen; Lee Dong-keun	21; 12	21; 17
4	(Chinese Taipei) (South Korea)	Chang Ching-hui / Yang Ching-tun; Chang Ye-na / Kong Hee-yong	13; 21	15; 21
5	(Chinese Taipei) (South Korea)	Tseng Min-hao / Hsieh Pei-shan; Seo Seung-jae / Chae Yoo-jung	10; 21	18; 21

== Group 1D ==
Pos	Team	Pld	W	L	MF	MA	MD	GF	GA	GD	PF	PA	PD	Pts	Qualification
1	China	2	2	0	10	0	+10	20	3	+17	481	354	+127	2	Advance to Quarterfinals
2	Malaysia	2	1	1	3	7	−4	9	14	−5	399	452	−53	1	Advance to Quarterfinals
3	India	2	0	2	2	8	−6	5	17	−12	362	436	−74	0	

Source: TS
Rules for classification: Tiebreakers

=== China vs Malaysia ===
China
5
Guangxi Sports Centre, Court 1
19 May 2019, 18:00 UTC+8

Malaysia
0

			1	2	3
1	(China) (Malaysia)	Li Junhui / Liu Yuchen; Aaron Chia / Soh Wooi Yik	18; 21	21; 14	24; 22
2	(China) (Malaysia)	Chen Yufei; Soniia Cheah Su Ya	21; 15	21; 23	21; 14
3	(China) (Malaysia)	Shi Yuqi; Lee Zii Jia	21; 12	21; 11
4	(China) (Malaysia)	Du Yue / Li Yinhui; Vivian Hoo Kah Mun / Yap Cheng Wen	21; 18	21; 14
5	(China) (Malaysia)	Zheng Siwei / Huang Yaqiong; Tan Kian Meng / Lai Pei Jing	21; 16	21; 12

=== India vs Malaysia ===
India
2
Guangxi Sports Centre, Court 1
21 May 2019, 11:00 UTC+8

Malaysia
3

			1	2	3
1	(India) (Malaysia)	Satwiksairaj Rankireddy / Ashwini Ponnappa; Goh Soon Huat / Shevon Jemie Lai	16; 21	21; 17	24; 22
2	(India) (Malaysia)	Sameer Verma; Lee Zii Jia	13; 21	15; 21
3	(India) (Malaysia)	P. V. Sindhu; Goh Jin Wei	21; 12	21; 8
4	(India) (Malaysia)	Manu Attri / B. Sumeeth Reddy; Aaron Chia / Teo Ee Yi	20; 22	19; 21
5	(India) (Malaysia)	Ashwini Ponnappa / N. Sikki Reddy; Chow Mei Kuan / Lee Meng Yean	11; 21	19; 21

=== China vs India ===
China
5
Guangxi Sports Centre, Court 1
22 May 2019, 11:00 UTC+8

India
0

			1	2	3
1	(China) (India)	Wang Yilü / Huang Dongping; Pranav Chopra / N. Sikki Reddy	21; 5	21; 11
2	(China) (India)	Chen Long; Sameer Verma	21; 17	22; 20
3	(China) (India)	Han Chengkai / Zhou Haodong; Satwiksairaj Rankireddy / Chirag Shetty	18; 21	21; 15	21; 17
4	(China) (India)	Chen Yufei; Saina Nehwal	21; 12	21; 17
5	(China) (India)	Chen Qingchen / Jia Yifan; Ashwini Ponnappa / N. Sikki Reddy	21; 12	21; 15

== Group 2A ==
Pos	Team	Pld	W	L	MF	MA	MD	GF	GA	GD	PF	PA	PD	Pts	Qualification
1	France	3	3	0	11	4	+7	23	12	+11	677	621	+56	3	Classification round
2	Netherlands	3	2	1	10	5	+5	22	13	+9	679	607	+72	2	Classification round
3	Vietnam	3	1	2	6	9	−3	15	19	−4	606	625	−19	1	Classification round
4	United States	3	0	3	3	12	−9	8	24	−16	491	600	−109	0	Classification round

Source: TS
Rules for classification: Tiebreakers

=== Netherlands vs Vietnam ===
Netherlands
3
Guangxi Sports Centre, Court 3
19 May 2019, 11:00 UTC+8

Vietnam
2

			1	2	3
1	(Netherlands) (Vietnam)	Jacco Arends / Cheryl Seinen; Đỗ Tuấn Đức / Phạm Như Thảo	21; 23	21; 12	21; 19
2	(Netherlands) (Vietnam)	Gayle Mahulette; Nguyễn Thùy Linh	10; 21	12; 21
3	(Netherlands) (Vietnam)	Mark Caljouw; Nguyễn Tiến Minh	17; 21	13; 21
4	(Netherlands) (Vietnam)	Selena Piek / Cheryl Seinen; Đinh Thị Phương Hồng / Vũ Thị Trang	21; 17	21; 13
5	(Netherlands) (Vietnam)	Jelle Maas / Robin Tabeling; Đỗ Tuấn Đức / Phạm Hồng Nam	21; 11	21; 13

=== France vs United States ===
France
4
Guangxi Sports Centre, Court 4
19 May 2019, 11:00 UTC+8

United States
1

			1	2	3
1	(France) (United States)	Ronan Labar / Anne Tran; Vinson Chiu / Breanna Chi	21; 12	21; 12
2	(France) (United States)	Marie Batomene; Iris Wang	7; 21	8; 21
3	(France) (United States)	Thomas Rouxel; Timothy Lam	21; 13	21; 16
4	(France) (United States)	Delphine Delrue / Léa Palermo; Jennie Gai / Angela Zhang	21; 8	21; 10
5	(France) (United States)	Thom Gicquel / Ronan Labar; Phillip Chew / Ryan Chew	21; 14	21; 17

=== France vs Vietnam ===
France
4
Guangxi Sports Centre, Court 2
20 May 2019, 11:00 UTC+8

Vietnam
1

			1	2	3
1	(France) (Vietnam)	Thom Gicquel / Delphine Delrue; Đỗ Tuấn Đức / Phạm Như Thảo	21; 19	24; 26	21; 15
2	(France) (Vietnam)	Yaëlle Hoyaux; Vũ Thị Trang	13; 21	10; 21
3	(France) (Vietnam)	Brice Leverdez; Nguyễn Tiến Minh	18; 21	23; 21	21; 19
4	(France) (Vietnam)	Émilie Lefel / Anne Tran; Đinh Thị Phương Hồng / Phạm Như Thảo	21; 18	22; 20
5	(France) (Vietnam)	Thom Gicquel / Ronan Labar; Đỗ Tuấn Đức / Phạm Hồng Nam	21; 8	21; 17

=== Netherlands vs United States ===
Netherlands
5
Guangxi Sports Centre, Court 4
20 May 2019, 11:00 UTC+8

United States
0

			1	2	3
1	(Netherlands) (United States)	Robin Tabeling / Selena Piek; Howard Shu / Paula Lynn Obañana	21; 16	21; 16
2	(Netherlands) (United States)	Mark Caljouw; Vinson Chiu	21; 11	21; 10
3	(Netherlands) (United States)	Jacco Arends / Ruben Jille; Phillip Chew / Ryan Chew	21; 14	19; 21	21; 9
4	(Netherlands) (United States)	Gayle Mahulette; Jennie Gai	21; 16	21; 13
5	(Netherlands) (United States)	Selena Piek / Cheryl Seinen; Breanna Chi / Paula Lynn Obañana	21; 13	21; 18

=== United States vs Vietnam ===
United States
2
Guangxi Sports Centre, Court 2
21 May 2019, 11:00 UTC+8

Vietnam
3

			1	2	3
1	(United States) (Vietnam)	Howard Shu / Paula Lynn Obanana; Đỗ Tuấn Đức / Phạm Như Thảo	21; 9	11; 6		retired
2	(United States) (Vietnam)	Iris Wang; Nguyễn Thùy Linh	21; 14	21; 12
3	(United States) (Vietnam)	Howard Shu; Phạm Cao Cường	17; 21	12; 21
4	(United States) (Vietnam)	Breanna Chi / Paula Lynn Obañana; Đinh Thị Phương Hồng / Vũ Thị Trang	9; 21	23; 21	14; 21
5	(United States) (Vietnam)	Phillip Chew / Ryan Chew; Đỗ Tuấn Đức / Phạm Hồng Nam	14; 21	17; 21

=== Netherlands vs France ===
Netherlands
2
Guangxi Sports Centre, Court 2
21 May 2019, 18:00 UTC+8

France
3

			1	2	3
1	(Netherlands) (France)	Robin Tabeling / Selena Piek; Ronan Labar / Anne Tran	21; 19	21; 15
2	(Netherlands) (France)	Gayle Mahulette; Marie Batomene	19; 21	21; 17	18; 21
3	(Netherlands) (France)	Mark Caljouw; Brice Leverdez	21; 15	11; 21	27; 25
4	(Netherlands) (France)	Selena Piek / Cheryl Seinen; Delphine Delrue / Léa Palermo	15; 21	20; 22
5	(Netherlands) (France)	Jacco Arends / Ruben Jille; Thom Gicquel / Ronan Labar	21; 19	17; 21	19; 21

== Group 2B ==
Pos	Team	Pld	W	L	MF	MA	MD	GF	GA	GD	PF	PA	PD	Pts	Qualification
1	Canada	3	3	0	11	4	+7	22	9	+13	619	515	+104	3	Classification round
2	Germany	3	2	1	8	7	+1	18	14	+4	594	547	+47	2	Classification round
3	Singapore	3	1	2	8	7	+1	17	14	+3	592	518	+74	1	Classification round
4	Israel	3	0	3	3	12	−9	6	26	−20	441	666	−225	0	Classification round

Source: TS
Rules for classification: Tiebreakers

=== Canada vs Singapore ===
Canada
3
Guangxi Sports Centre, Court 2
19 May 2019, 11:00 UTC+8

Singapore
2

			1	2	3
1	(Canada) (Singapore)	Duncan Yao / Josephine Wu; Danny Bawa Chrisnanta / Tan Wei Han	13; 21	11; 21
2	(Canada) (Singapore)	Michelle Li; Yeo Jia Min	22; 20	21; 15
3	(Canada) (Singapore)	Brian Yang; Loh Kean Yew	18; 21	15; 21
4	(Canada) (Singapore)	Rachel Honderich / Kristen Tsai; Jin Yujia / Lim Ming Hui	21; 13	21; 10
5	(Canada) (Singapore)	Jason Ho-shue / Nyl Yakura; Danny Bawa Chrisnanta / Loh Kean Hean	21; 16	27; 25

=== Germany vs Israel ===
Germany
3
Guangxi Sports Centre, Court 3
19 May 2019, 18:00 UTC+8

Israel
2

			1	2	3
1	(Germany) (Israel)	Jones Ralfy Jansen / Peter Käsbauer; May Bar Netzer / Ariel Shainski	21; 14	21; 11
2	(Germany) (Israel)	Fabienne Deprez; Ksenia Polikarpova	17; 21	21; 14	19; 21
3	(Germany) (Israel)	Kai Schäfer; Misha Zilberman	18; 21	18; 21
4	(Germany) (Israel)	Johanna Goliszewski / Lara Käpplein; Margaret Lurie / Yuval Pugach	21; 10	21; 5
5	(Germany) (Israel)	Marvin Emil Seidel / Linda Efler; May Bar Netzer / Ksenia Polikarpova	21; 7	21; 11

=== Germany vs Singapore ===
Germany
3
Guangxi Sports Centre, Court 3
20 May 2019, 18:00 UTC+8

Singapore
2

			1	2	3
1	(Germany) (Singapore)	Mark Lamsfuß / Isabel Herttrich; Danny Bawa Chrisnanta / Tan Wei Han	21; 15	21; 15
2	(Germany) (Singapore)	Yvonne Li; Yeo Jia Min	10; 21	13; 21
3	(Germany) (Singapore)	Alexander Roovers; Loh Kean Yew	13; 21	16; 21
4	(Germany) (Singapore)	Linda Efler / Isabel Herttrich; Jin Yujia / Lim Ming Hui	21; 15	21; 18
5	(Germany) (Singapore)	Mark Lamsfuß / Marvin Emil Seidel; Loh Kean Hean / Toh Han Zhuo	21; 14	22; 20

=== Canada vs Israel ===
Canada
5
Guangxi Sports Centre, Court 4
20 May 2019, 18:00 UTC+8

Israel
0

			1	2	3
1	(Canada) (Israel)	Joshua Hurlburt-Yu / Josephine Wu; Ariel Shainski / Margaret Lurie	21; 11	21; 4
2	(Canada) (Israel)	Brittney Tam; Ksenia Polikarpova	21; 15	25; 23
3	(Canada) (Israel)	B. R. Sankeerth; May Bar Netzer	22; 20	21; 14
4	(Canada) (Israel)	Rachel Honderich / Kristen Tsai; Margaret Lurie / Yuval Pugach	21; 10	21; 7
5	(Canada) (Israel)	Jason Ho-shue / Nyl Yakura; Ariel Shainski / Misha Zilberman	21; 9	25; 23

=== Germany vs Canada ===
Germany
2
Guangxi Sports Centre, Court 3
22 May 2019, 11:00 UTC+8

Canada
3

			1	2	3
1	(Germany) (Canada)	Mark Lamsfuß / Marvin Emil Seidel; Joshua Hurlburt-Yu / Duncan Yao	21; 10	21; 16
2	(Germany) (Canada)	Yvonne Li; Michelle Li	25; 23	17; 21	5; 21
3	(Germany) (Canada)	Kai Schäfer; Jason Ho-shue	12; 21	17; 21
4	(Germany) (Canada)	Johanna Goliszewski / Lara Käpplein; Rachel Honderich / Kristen Tsai	18; 21	17; 21
5	(Germany) (Canada)	Mark Lamsfuß / Isabel Herttrich; Joshua Hurlburt-Yu / Josephine Wu	22; 20	21; 15

=== Singapore vs Israel ===
Singapore
4
Guangxi Sports Centre, Court 4
22 May 2019, 11:00 UTC+8

Israel
1

			1	2	3
1	(Singapore) (Israel)	Danny Bawa Chrisnanta / Tan Wei Han; May Bar Netzer / Yuval Pugach	21; 2	21; 7
2	(Singapore) (Israel)	Jaslyn Hooi Yue Yann; Ksenia Polikarpova	21; 17	21; 14
3	(Singapore) (Israel)	Joel Koh Jia Wei; Misha Zilberman	21; 16	13; 21	26; 28
4	(Singapore) (Israel)	Jaslyn Hooi Yue Yann / Crystal Wong; Margaret Lurie / Yuval Pugach	21; 4	21; 12
5	(Singapore) (Israel)	Loh Kean Hean / Toh Han Zhuo; May Bar Netzer / Ariel Shainski	21; 12	21; 16

== Group 3A ==
Pos	Team	Pld	W	L	MF	MA	MD	GF	GA	GD	PF	PA	PD	Pts	Qualification
1	Ireland	3	3	0	11	4	+7	24	10	+14	656	500	+156	3	Classification round
2	Australia	3	2	1	9	6	+3	19	16	+3	633	582	+51	2	Classification round
3	New Zealand	3	1	2	7	8	−1	18	19	−1	667	682	−15	1	Classification round
4	Nepal	3	0	3	3	12	−9	8	24	−16	451	643	−192	0	Classification round

Source: TS
Rules for classification: Tiebreakers

=== Ireland vs Nepal ===
Ireland
5
Guangxi Sports Centre, Court 5
19 May 2019, 11:00 UTC+8

Nepal
0

			1	2	3
1	(Republic of Ireland) (Nepal)	Sam Magee / Chloe Magee; Dipesh Dhami / Amita Giri	21; 6	21; 4
2	(Republic of Ireland) (Nepal)	Nhat Nguyen; Ratnajit Tamang	21; 12	21; 14
3	(Republic of Ireland) (Nepal)	Kate Frost; Nangsal Tamang	21; 19	21; 9
4	(Republic of Ireland) (Nepal)	Sam Magee / Nhat Nguyen; Dipesh Dhami / Ratnajit Tamang	21; 16	21; 16
5	(Republic of Ireland) (Nepal)	Rachael Darragh / Kate Frost; Amita Giri / Nangsal Tamang	21; 2	21; 5

=== Australia vs New Zealand ===
Australia
4
Guangxi Sports Centre, Court 5
19 May 2019, 18:00 UTC+8

New Zealand
1

			1	2	3
1	(Australia) (New Zealand)	Sawan Serasinghe / Setyana Mapasa; Oliver Leydon-Davis / Anona Pak	21; 15	21; 23	21; 7
2	(Australia) (New Zealand)	Louisa Ma; Sally Fu	21; 18	18; 21	21; 11
3	(Australia) (New Zealand)	Jacob Schueler; Abhinav Manota	16; 21	17; 21
4	(Australia) (New Zealand)	Setyana Mapasa / Gronya Somerville; Anona Pak / Alyssa Tagle	21; 12	21; 11
5	(Australia) (New Zealand)	Sawan Serasinghe / Eric Vuong; Oliver Leydon-Davis / Abhinav Manota	13; 21	21; 15	22; 20

=== Australia vs Nepal ===
Australia
3
Guangxi Sports Centre, Court 3
21 May 2019, 11:00 UTC+8

Nepal
2

			1	2	3
1	(Australia) (Nepal)	Simon Leung / Gronya Somerville; Dipesh Dhami / Amita Giri	21; 11	21; 12
2	(Australia) (Nepal)	Tiffany Ho; Nangsal Tamang	21; 12	18; 21	21; 18
3	(Australia) (Nepal)	Ashwant Gobinathan; Ratnajit Tamang	19; 21	14; 21
4	(Australia) (Nepal)	Tiffany Ho / Gronya Somerville; Amita Giri / Nangsal Tamang	21; 6	21; 5
5	(Australia) (Nepal)	Simon Leung / Eric Vuong; Dipesh Dhami / Ratnajit Tamang	17; 21	16; 21

=== Ireland vs New Zealand ===
Ireland
3
Guangxi Sports Centre, Court 5
21 May 2019, 11:00 UTC+8

New Zealand
2

			1	2	3
1	(Republic of Ireland) (New Zealand)	Sam Magee / Chloe Magee; Oliver Leydon-Davis / Anona Pak	17; 21	21; 19	19; 21
2	(Republic of Ireland) (New Zealand)	Kate Frost; Sally Fu	21; 17	14; 21	18; 21
3	(Republic of Ireland) (New Zealand)	Nhat Nguyen; Abhinav Manota	21; 18	13; 21	21; 9
4	(Republic of Ireland) (New Zealand)	Rachael Darragh / Chloe Magee; Sally Fu / Anona Pak	21; 12	21; 18
5	(Republic of Ireland) (New Zealand)	Sam Magee / Nhat Nguyen; Abhinav Manota / Dacmen Vong	21; 17	21; 13

=== Ireland vs Australia ===
Ireland
3
Guangxi Sports Centre, Court 5
22 May 2019, 11:00 UTC+8

Australia
2

			1	2	3
1	(Republic of Ireland) (Australia)	Sam Magee / Chloe Magee; Sawan Serasinghe / Setyana Mapasa	21; 9	12; 21	21; 11
2	(Republic of Ireland) (Australia)	Kate Frost; Louisa Ma	14; 21	16; 21
3	(Republic of Ireland) (Australia)	Nhat Nguyen; Jacob Schueler	21; 4	21; 12
4	(Republic of Ireland) (Australia)	Rachael Darragh / Chloe Magee; Setyana Mapasa / Gronya Somerville	10; 21	19; 21
5	(Republic of Ireland) (Australia)	Sam Magee / Nhat Nguyen; Sawan Serasinghe / Eric Vuong	21; 17	21; 11

=== New Zealand vs Nepal ===
New Zealand
4
Guangxi Sports Centre, Court 5
22 May 2019, 18:00 UTC+8

Nepal
1

			1	2	3
1	(New Zealand) (Nepal)	Oliver Leydon-Davis / Anona Pak; Dipesh Dhami / Amita Giri	21; 7	21; 7
2	(New Zealand) (Nepal)	Sally Fu; Nangsal Tamang	23; 21	21; 12
3	(New Zealand) (Nepal)	Edward Lau; Ratnajit Tamang	10; 21	22; 24
4	(New Zealand) (Nepal)	Alyssa Tagle / Justine Villegas; Amita Giri / Nangsal Tamang	21; 17	21; 15
5	(New Zealand) (Nepal)	Oliver Leydon-Davis / Abhinav Manota; Dipesh Dhami / Ratnajit Tamang	21; 19	21; 23	21; 13

== Group 3B ==
Pos	Team	Pld	W	L	MF	MA	MD	GF	GA	GD	PF	PA	PD	Pts	Qualification
1	Sri Lanka	3	3	0	12	3	+9	24	8	+16	634	472	+162	3	Classification round
2	Switzerland	3	2	1	11	4	+7	25	9	+16	672	533	+139	2	Classification round
3	Slovakia	3	1	2	5	10	−5	12	21	−9	538	633	−95	1	Classification round
4	Lithuania	3	0	3	2	13	−11	5	28	−23	476	682	−206	0	Classification round

Source: TS
Rules for classification: Tiebreakers

=== Switzerland vs Lithuania ===
Switzerland
4
Guangxi Sports Centre, Court 3
20 May 2019, 11:00 UTC+8

Lithuania
1

			1	2	3
1	(Switzerland) (Lithuania)	Oliver Schaller / Céline Burkart; Povilas Bartušis / Vytautė Fomkinaitė	21; 8	21; 12
2	(Switzerland) (Lithuania)	Ronja Stern; Gerda Voitechovskaja	21; 17	21; 13
3	(Switzerland) (Lithuania)	Tobias Kuenzi; Mark Sames	19; 21	21; 7	19; 21
4	(Switzerland) (Lithuania)	Sabrina Jaquet / Jenjira Stadelmann; Vytautė Fomkinaitė / Gerda Voitechovskaja	21; 6	21; 10
5	(Switzerland) (Lithuania)	Christian Kirchmayr / Oliver Schaller; Povilas Bartušis / Mark Sames	21; 11	22; 20

=== Sri Lanka vs Slovakia ===
Sri Lanka
4
Guangxi Sports Centre, Court 5
20 May 2019, 11:00 UTC+8

Slovakia
1

			1	2	3
1	(Sri Lanka) (Slovakia)	Sachin Dias / Thilini Pramodika Hendahewa; Juraj Vachálek / Mia Tarcalova	21; 11	21; 8
2	(Sri Lanka) (Slovakia)	Dilmi Dias; Martina Repiská	15; 21	16; 21
3	(Sri Lanka) (Slovakia)	Dinuka Karunaratne; Milan Dratva	21; 17	21; 14
4	(Sri Lanka) (Slovakia)	Thilini Pramodika Hendahewa / Kavidi Sirimannage; Martina Repiská / Mia Tarcalova	21; 7	21; 10
5	(Sri Lanka) (Slovakia)	Sachin Dias / Buwaneka Goonethilleka; Andrej Antoška / Jakub Horak	21; 8	21; 15

=== Sri Lanka vs Lithuania ===
Sri Lanka
5
Guangxi Sports Centre, Court 3
21 May 2019, 18:00 UTC+8

Lithuania
0

			1	2	3
1	(Sri Lanka) (Lithuania)	Sachin Dias / Thilini Pramodika Hendahewa; Povilas Bartušis / Gerda Voitechovskaja	21; 14	21; 11
2	(Sri Lanka) (Lithuania)	Dilmi Dias; Vytaute Fomkinaite	21; 17	21; 14
3	(Sri Lanka) (Lithuania)	Dinuka Karunaratne; Mark Sames	21; 8	21; 11
4	(Sri Lanka) (Lithuania)	Thilini Pramodika Hendahewa / Kavidi Sirimannage; Vytaute Fomkinaite / Gerda Voitechovskaja	21; 7	21; 16
5	(Sri Lanka) (Lithuania)	Sachin Dias / Buwaneka Goonethilleka; Povilas Bartušis / Mark Sames	21; 11	21; 11

=== Switzerland vs Slovakia ===
Switzerland
5
Guangxi Sports Centre, Court 5
21 May 2019, 18:00 UTC+8

Slovakia
0

			1	2	3
1	(Switzerland) (Slovakia)	Oliver Schaller / Céline Burkart; Jakub Horák / Mia Tarcalova	21; 4	21; 8
2	(Switzerland) (Slovakia)	Christian Kirchmayr; Milan Dratva	14; 21	21; 16	21; 18
3	(Switzerland) (Slovakia)	Sabrina Jaquet; Martina Repiská	21; 18	21; 17
4	(Switzerland) (Slovakia)	Tobias Kuenzi / Oliver Schaller; Milan Dratva / Juraj Vachálek	21; 15	21; 12
5	(Switzerland) (Slovakia)	Céline Burkart / Jenjira Stadelmann; Martina Repiská / Mia Tarcalova	21; 18	21; 15

=== Switzerland vs Sri Lanka ===
Switzerland
2
Guangxi Sports Centre, Court 3
22 May 2019, 18:00 UTC+8

Sri Lanka
3

			1	2	3
1	(Switzerland) (Sri Lanka)	Christian Kirchmayr; Dinuka Karunaratne	16; 21	14; 21
2	(Switzerland) (Sri Lanka)	Oliver Schaller / Céline Burkart; Sachin Dias / Thilini Pramodika Hendahewa	21; 18	21; 18
3	(Switzerland) (Sri Lanka)	Sabrina Jaquet; Kavidi Sirimannage	21; 15	21; 10
4	(Switzerland) (Sri Lanka)	Tobias Kuenzi / Oliver Schaller; Sachin Dias / Buwaneka Goonethilleka	22; 20	8; 21	15; 21
5	(Switzerland) (Sri Lanka)	Céline Burkart / Sabrina Jaquet; Thilini Pramodika Hendahewa / Kavidi Sirimannage	21; 16	20; 22	20; 22

=== Slovakia vs Lithuania ===
Slovakia
4
Guangxi Sports Centre, Court 4
22 May 2019, 18:00 UTC+8

Lithuania
1

			1	2	3
1	(Slovakia) (Lithuania)	Juraj Vachalek / Mia Tarcalova; Povilas Bartušis / Vytaute Fomkinaite	21; 18	19; 21	17; 21
2	(Slovakia) (Lithuania)	Martina Repiská; Gerda Voitechovskaja	21; 19	21; 9
3	(Slovakia) (Lithuania)	Milan Dratva; Mark Sames	21; 16	21; 13
4	(Slovakia) (Lithuania)	Martina Repiská / Mia Tarcalova; Vytaute Fomkinaite / Gerda Voitechovskaja	22; 20	21; 17
5	(Slovakia) (Lithuania)	Andrej Antoska / Juraj Vachalek; Povilas Bartušis / Mark Sames	17; 21	22; 20	21; 15

== Group 4 ==
Pos	Team	Pld	W	L	MF	MA	MD	GF	GA	GD	PF	PA	PD	Pts
1	Macau	2	2	0	8	2	+6	18	5	+13	456	333	+123	2
2	Kazakhstan	2	1	1	6	4	+2	13	12	+1	444	427	+17	1
3	Greenland	2	0	2	1	9	−8	5	19	−14	340	480	−140	0

Source: TS
Rules for classification: Tiebreakers

=== Macau vs Greenland ===
Macau
5
Guangxi Sports Centre, Court 4
19 May 2019, 18:00 UTC+8

Greenland
0

			1	2	3
1	(Macau) (Greenland)	Ng Chi Chong / Kuan Chi Leng; Frederik Elsner / Nina Høegh	21; 15	21; 15
2	(Macau) (Greenland)	Pui Pang Fong; Jens-Frederik Nielsen	21; 10	21; 9
3	(Macau) (Greenland)	Pui Chi Wa; Sara Lindskov Jacobsen	21; 13	21; 12
4	(Macau) (Greenland)	Lam Chi Man / Leong Kin Fai; Frederik Elsner / Jens-Frederik Nielsen	21; 14	19; 21	21; 17
5	(Macau) (Greenland)	Gong Xue Xin / Ng Weng Chi; Nina Høegh / Sara Lindskov Jacobsen	21; 12	21; 2

=== Kazakhstan vs Greenland ===
Kazakhstan
4
Guangxi Sports Centre, Court 4
21 May 2019, 11:00 UTC+8

Greenland
1

			1	2	3
1	(Kazakhstan) (Greenland)	Khaitmurat Kulmatov / Oxsana Shtelle; Toke Ketwa-Driefer / Milka Brønlund	21; 8	17; 21	21; 8
2	(Kazakhstan) (Greenland)	Dmitriy Panarin; Jens-Frederik Nielsen	21; 14	21; 14
3	(Kazakhstan) (Greenland)	Aisha Zhumabek; Sara Lindskov Jacobsen	23; 21	13; 21	18; 21
4	(Kazakhstan) (Greenland)	Artur Niyazov / Dmitriy Panarin; Frederik Elsner / Jens-Frederik Nielsen	21; 9	21; 10
5	(Kazakhstan) (Greenland)	Oxsana Shtelle / Aisha Zhumabek; Nina Høegh / Sara Lindskov Jacobsen	12; 21	21; 19	21; 13

=== Macau vs Kazakhstan ===
Macau
3
Guangxi Sports Centre, Court 4
23 May 2019, 11:00 UTC+8

Kazakhstan
2

			1	2	3
1	(Macau) (Kazakhstan)	Ng Chi Chong / Kuan Chi Leng; Khaitmurat Kulmatov / Oxsana Shtelle	21; 8	21; 15
2	(Macau) (Kazakhstan)	Pui Pang Fong; Dmitriy Panarin	21; 16	18; 21	15; 21
3	(Macau) (Kazakhstan)	Pui Chi Wa; Kamila Smagulova	21; 12	21; 17
4	(Macau) (Kazakhstan)	Lam Chi Man / Leong Kin Fai; Artur Niyazov / Dmitriy Panarin	12; 21	21; 15	14; 21
5	(Macau) (Kazakhstan)	Gong Xue Xin / Ng Weng Chi; Oxsana Shtelle / Aisha Zhumabek	21; 19	21; 7
