= Nepal Badminton Association =

Sports governing body in Nepal

- Sport: Badminton
- Jurisdiction: (Nepal) National
- Abbreviation: NBA
- Founded: 1952
- Affiliation: Badminton World Federation
- Regional affiliation: Badminton Asia
- Headquarters: Dasarath Stadium, Kathmandu
- President: Ramji Bahadur Shrestha

Official website
- www.badmintonnepal.org
- (Nepal)

Nepal Badminton Association (NBA) is the governing body of badminton in Nepal. NBA is an association registered under National Sports Council (Nepal), a sports governing body in Nepal. It was formed in 1952, organizing different tournaments and promoting Badminton in Nepal.

Nepal Badminton Association annually organizes Nepal International tournament.

Nepal Badminton Association's Player Ranking List :

== Affiliated associations ==
S.N	Province	Affiliate District Association	President
1.	Koshi Province Badminton Association	Bhojpur District Badminton Association; Dhankuta District Badminton Association; Ilam District Badminton Association; Jhapa District Badminton Association; Morang District Badminton Association; Sankhuwasabha District Badminton Association; Solukhumbu District Badminton Association; Sunsari District Badminton Association; Taplejung District Badminton Association; Khotang District Badminton Association; Terathum District Badminton Association; Panchthar District Badminton Association; Udayapur District Badminton Association	
2.	Madhesh Province Badminton Association		
3.	Bagmati Province Badminton Association	Bhaktapur District Badminton Association; Chitwan District Badminton Association; Dhading District Badminton Association; Dolakha District Badminton Association; Kathmandu District Badminton Association; Kavre District Badminton Association; Makwanpur District Badminton Association; Nuwakot District Badminton Association; Lalitpur District Badminton Association	
4.	Gandaki Province Badminton Association	Baglung District Badminton Association; Kaski District Badminton Association; Myagdi District Badminton Association; Parbat District Badminton Association; Tanahu District Badminton Association	
5.	Lumbini Province Badminton Association	Arghakhachi District Badminton Association; Banke District Badminton Association; Dang District Badminton Association; Gulmi District Badminton Association; Kapilvasthu District Badminton Association; Palpa District Badminton Association; Rupandehi District Badminton Association	
6.	Karnali Province Badminton Association	Kalikot District Badminton Association; Surkhet District Badminton Association	
7.	Sudurpashchim Province Badminton Association	Baitadi District Badminton Association; Darchula District Badminton Association; Doti District Badminton Association; Kailali District Badminton Association; Kanchanpur District Badminton Association	

== See also ==
- Nepal national badminton team
- Prince Dahal
- Pashupati Paneru
- Ratnajit Tamang
- Nangsal Tamang
