= Joyce Choong =

Malaysian-Australian badminton player (born 1995)

Joyce Choong 钟慧琪
Personal information
- Born: Joyce Choong Wai Chi; 20 December 1995 (age 30) Bukit Mertajam, Penang, Malaysia

Sport
- Country: Malaysia (2010–2018); Australia (2019–present)
- Sport: Badminton
- Handedness: Right

Women's & mixed doubles
- Highest ranking: 51 (WD 18 August 2016); 331 (XD 15 September 2011)
- BWF profile
Medal record
Women's badminton
Representing Australia
Oceania Championships
Gold medal – first place	2022 Melbourne	Women's doubles
Bronze medal – third place	2023 Auckland	Women's doubles
Oceania Mixed Team Championships
Gold medal – first place	2023 Auckland	Mixed team
Representing Malaysia
World Junior Championships
Gold medal – first place	2011 Taipei	Mixed team
Asia Junior Championships
Silver medal – second place	2011 Lucknow	Mixed team

Joyce Choong Wai Chi (born 20 December 1995) is a Malaysian-born badminton player and currently representing Australia.

== Achievements ==
=== Oceania Championships ===
Women's doubles
Year	Venue	Partner	Opponent	Score	Result
2022	Melbourne Sports and Aquatic Centre; Melbourne, Australia	(Australia) Sylvina Kurniawan	(Australia) Kaitlyn Ea (Australia) Gronya Somerville	21–19, 21–15	Gold
2023	Auckland Badminton Stadium; Auckland, New Zealand	(Australia) Gronya Somerville	(Australia) Sylvina Kurniawan (Australia) Setyana Mapasa	19–21, 11–21	Bronze

=== BWF International Challenge/Series (4 runners-up) ===
Women's doubles
Year	Tournament	Partner	Opponent	Score	Result
2015	Iran Fajr International	(Malaysia) Yap Cheng Wen	(Turkey) Özge Bayrak (Turkey) Neslihan Yiğit	19–21, 18–21	(silver) Runner-up
2015	Belgian International	(Malaysia) Yap Cheng Wen	(Denmark) Maiken Fruergaard (Denmark) Sara Thygesen	18–21, 11–21	(silver) Runner-up
2016	India International Series	(Malaysia) Lim Jee Lynn	(Malaysia) Goh Yea Ching (Malaysia) Lim Chiew Sien	6–11, 7–11, 11–6, 7–11	(silver) Runner-up
2017	Vietnam International	(Malaysia) Tee Jing Yi	(Japan) Erina Honda (Japan) Nozomi Shimizu	14–21, 21–19, 14–21	(silver) Runner-up

BWF International Challenge tournament
BWF International Series tournament
BWF Future Series tournament
