= 2022 Oceania Badminton Championships =

Tournament details
- Dates: February 18 – February 20 Cancelled (Team event); April 28 – May 1 (Individual event)
- Edition: XVI
- Venue: Melbourne Sports and Aquatic Centre
- Location: Melbourne, Australia

Champions
- Men's singles: (New Zealand) Edward Lau
- Women's singles: (Australia) Chen Hsuan-yu
- Men's doubles: (New Zealand) Abhinav Manota (New Zealand) Jack Wang
- Women's doubles: (Australia) Joyce Choong (Australia) Sylvina Kurniawan
- Mixed doubles: (Australia) Kenneth Choo (Australia) Gronya Somerville

The 2022 Oceania Badminton Championships was the continental badminton championships in Oceania sanctioned by the Badminton Oceania, and Badminton World Federation. It had been announced that most of the events in the Oceania Badminton Championships for 2022 were cancelled, including the Men's and Women's Team Championships, due to New Zealand's COVID-19 related border restrictions. However, the individual tournaments were postponed with the possibility of taking place in week 17 of the BWF tournament calendar.

This championship was organized by Badminton Victoria, and was the 16th edition of the Oceania Badminton Championships. It was held in Melbourne, Australia from 28 April to 1 May 2022.

== Venue ==
The tournament was held at the Melbourne Sports and Aquatic Centre, Melbourne, Australia.

== Medal summary ==
=== Medalists ===
Event	Gold	Silver	Bronze
Men's singles	(New Zealand) Edward Lau	(Australia) Nathan Tang	(Australia) Lin Ying Xiang
Men's singles	(New Zealand) Edward Lau	(Australia) Nathan Tang	(New Zealand) Oscar Guo
Women's singles	(Australia) Chen Hsuan-yu	(Australia) Louisa Ma	(Australia) Sydney Tjonadi
Women's singles	(Australia) Chen Hsuan-yu	(Australia) Louisa Ma	(Australia) Tiffany Ho
Men's doubles	(New Zealand) Abhinav Manota (New Zealand) Jack Wang	(Australia) Kenneth Choo (Australia) Lim Ming Chuen	(Australia) Lin Ying Xiang (Australia) Teoh Kai Chen
Men's doubles	(New Zealand) Abhinav Manota (New Zealand) Jack Wang	(Australia) Kenneth Choo (Australia) Lim Ming Chuen	(Australia) Jordan Yang (Australia) Frederick Zhao
Women's doubles	(Australia) Joyce Choong (Australia) Sylvina Kurniawan	(Australia) Kaitlyn Ea (Australia) Gronya Somerville	(Australia) Jazmine Lam (Australia) Sydney Tjonadi
Women's doubles	(Australia) Joyce Choong (Australia) Sylvina Kurniawan	(Australia) Kaitlyn Ea (Australia) Gronya Somerville	(Australia) Dania Nugroho (Australia) Catrina Tan
Mixed doubles	(Australia) Kenneth Choo (Australia) Gronya Somerville	(New Zealand) Oliver Leydon-Davis (New Zealand) Anona Pak	(Australia) Mitchell Wheller (Australia) Angela Yu
Mixed doubles	(Australia) Kenneth Choo (Australia) Gronya Somerville	(New Zealand) Oliver Leydon-Davis (New Zealand) Anona Pak	(Australia) Jordan Yang (Australia) Maureen Wijaya

=== Medal table ===
* Host nation (Australia)

Rank	Nation	Gold	Silver	Bronze	Total
1	Australia*	3	4	9	16
2	New Zealand	2	1	1	4
Totals (2 entries)		5	5	10	20

== Men's singles ==
=== Seeds ===
1. (New Zealand) Abhinav Manota (quarter-finals)
2. (Australia) Anthony Joe (third round)
3. (Australia) Pit Seng Low (second round)
4. (Australia) Jacob Schueler (quarter-finals)
5. (Australia) Adam Dolman (third round)
6. (Australia) Keith Mark Edison (second round)
7. (New Zealand) Edward Lau (champion)
8. (Australia) Jack Yu (third round)

=== Finals ===
Semi-finals
(Australia) Nathan Tang	21	23
(Australia) Lin Ying Xiang	18	21
7	(New Zealand) Edward Lau	11	21	21
(New Zealand) Oscar Guo	21	16	17

Final
(Australia) Nathan Tang	18	10
7	(New Zealand) Edward Lau	21	21

=== Top half ===
==== Section 1 ====
First Round
(Australia) E Stephen Sam	21	21
(Fiji) J Chung	6	13
(Australia) W Sayaphet	10	12
(Australia) J Lim	21	21
(Australia) N Tang	21	21
(New Zealand) A Rouse	15	12

Second Round
1	(New Zealand) A Manota	21	21
(Australia) A Jhade	12	10
(Australia) B Guo	14	9
(Australia) E Stephen Sam	21	21
5	(Australia) A Dolman	21	21
(Australia) J Lim	4	16
(Australia) D Binod
(Australia) N Tang	w	/	o

Third Round
1	(New Zealand) A Manota	21	21
(Australia) E Stephen Sam	13	7
5	(Australia) A Dolman	13	16
(Australia) N Tang	21	21

Quarter-finals
1	(New Zealand) A Manota	16	23	16
(Australia) N Tang	21	21	21

==== Section 2 ====
First Round
(Australia) O Neelam	9	17
(New Zealand) R Cheng	21	21
(Australia) Lin Y X	21	21
(New Zealand) Daxxon Vong	10	16
(New Zealand) E van der Ley	13	16
(Australia) J Yang	21	21

Second Round
3	(Australia) P S Low	14	14
(Australia) Teoh K C	21	21
(Australia) Chan J Y	10	18
(New Zealand) R Cheng	21	21
6	(Australia) K M Edison	16	14
(Australia) Lin Y X	21	21
(Australia) M L Ranasinghe	21	21
(Australia) J Yang	15	18

Third Round
(Australia) Teoh K C	10	15
(New Zealand) R Cheng	21	21
(Australia) Lin Y X	21	21
(Australia) M L Ranasinghe	12	8

Quarter-finals
(New Zealand) R Cheng	18	12
(Australia) Lin Y X	21	21

=== Bottom half ===
==== Section 3 ====
First Round
(French Polynesia) R Rossi	21	21
(Australia) C Yu	10	10
(Australia) J Lee	21	21	21
(Australia) T Ng	23	13	11
(New Zealand) A Sharma	w	/	o
(Australia) F Huang

Second Round
(French Polynesia) R Rossi	w	/	o
(Australia) K Goh
(Australia) J Lee	16	12
7	(New Zealand) E Lau	21	21
(New Zealand) A Sharma	21	21
(Australia) C Elliott	9	7
(Australia) K Richardson	21	14	19
4	(Australia) J Schueler	17	21	21

Third Round
(French Polynesia) R Rossi	21	15	4
7	(New Zealand) E Lau	12	21	21
(New Zealand) A Sharma	3	7^{r}
4	(Australia) J Schueler	21	18

Quarter-finals
7	(New Zealand) E Lau	21	21
4	(Australia) J Schueler	17	16

==== Section 4 ====
First Round
(New Zealand) J Feng	14	12
(Australia) A Selladurai	21	21
(Australia) Matt Kong	6	14
(Australia) G K Ong	21	21
(Australia) S Dhand	9	13
(New Zealand) O Guo	21	21

Second Round
(Australia) A Selladurai	21	21
(Australia) V Nguyen	10	10
(Australia) G K Ong	20	21	11
8	(Australia) J Yu	22	8	21
(New Zealand) O Guo	21	21
(Australia) F Zhao	5	8
(Australia) R Lydra	20	9
2	(Australia) A Joe	22	21

Third Round
(Australia) A Selladurai	21	21
8	(Australia) J Yu	19	16
(New Zealand) O Guo	21	21
2	(Australia) A Joe	10	16

Quarter-finals
(Australia) A Selladurai	22	11
(New Zealand) O Guo	24	21

== Women's singles ==
=== Seeds ===
1. (Australia) Chen Hsuan-yu (champion)
2. (Australia) Louisa Ma (final)
3. (Australia) Tiffany Ho (semi-finals)
4. (New Zealand) Shaunna Li (withdrew)

=== Finals ===
Semi-finals
1	(Australia) Chen Hsuan-yu	21	21
(Australia) Sydney Tjonadi	5	9
3	(Australia) Tiffany Ho	21	19	11
2	(Australia) Louisa Ma	14	21	21

Final
1	(Australia) Chen Hsuan-yu	21	21
2	(Australia) Louisa Ma	17	18

=== Top half ===
==== Section 1 ====
First Round

Second Round
1	(Australia) Chen H-y	21	21
(Australia) J Chan	4	2
(Australia) I Yan	21	21
(Australia) S Ung	8	10

Quarter-finals
1	(Australia) Chen H-y	21	21
(Australia) I Yan	14	3

==== Section 2 ====
First Round

Second Round
4	(New Zealand) S Li
(Australia) V Tjonadi	w	/	o
(Australia) S Tjonadi	21	21
(Australia) M Wijaya	15	5

Quarter-finals
(Australia) V Tjonadi	18	20
(Australia) S Tjonadi	21	22

=== Bottom half ===
==== Section 3 ====
First Round
(Fiji) S Nadan	9	7
(Australia) J Lam	21	21

Second Round
(Australia) J Lam	18	8
(Australia) S Go	21	21
(Australia) D Nugroho	10	16
3	(Australia) T Ho	21	21

Quarter-finals
(Australia) S Go	16	20
3	(Australia) T Ho	21	22

==== Section 4 ====
First Round

Second Round
(Australia) Lim Y-y	15	8
(Australia) Teoh K Q	21	21
(Australia) C Tan	15	17
2	(Australia) L Ma	21	21

Quarter-finals
(Australia) Teoh K Q	10	11
2	(Australia) L Ma	21	21

== Men's doubles ==
=== Seeds ===
1. (Australia) Lin Ying Xiang / Teoh Kai Chen (semi-finals)
2. (Australia) Vincent Nguyen / Pham Le The Hung (second round)
3. (Australia) Eric Vuong / (New Zealand) Maika Phillips (second round)
4. (New Zealand) Abhinav Manota / Jack Wang (champion)

=== Finals ===
Semi-finals
1	(Australia) Lin Ying Xiang (Australia) Teoh Kai Chen	14	13
4	(New Zealand) Abhinav Manota (New Zealand) Jack Wang	21	21
(Australia) Kenneth Choo (Australia) Lim Ming Chuen	21	21
(Australia) Jordan Yang (Australia) Frederick Zhao	5	19

Final
4	(New Zealand) Abhinav Manota (New Zealand) Jack Wang	21	23
(Australia) Kenneth Choo (Australia) Lim Ming Chuen	14	21

=== Top half ===
==== Section 1 ====
First Round
(New Zealand) R Cheng (New Zealand) J Feng	19	17
(Australia) A Gobinathan (Australia) T Ng	21	21

Second Round
1	(Australia) Lin Y X (Australia) Teoh K C	21	21
(Australia) Marc Kong (Australia) R Wang	15	15
(Australia) E Stephen Sam (Australia) M Wheller	21	17	8
(Australia) A Gobinathan (Australia) T Ng	16	21	21

Quarter-finals
1	(Australia) Lin Y X (Australia) Teoh K C	21	21
(Australia) A Gobinathan (Australia) T Ng	11	19

==== Section 2 ====
First Round
(Australia) C Elliott (Australia) R Lydra	15	9
(New Zealand) A Jeffrey (New Zealand) D Soedjasa	21	21

Second Round
4	(New Zealand) A Manota (New Zealand) J Wang	21	21
(Australia) J Lee (Australia) M L Ranasinghe	14	9
(Australia) S Dhand (Australia) O Neelam	9	13
(New Zealand) A Jeffrey (New Zealand) D Soedjasa	21	21

Quarter-finals
4	(New Zealand) A Manota (New Zealand) J Wang	21	20	21
(New Zealand) A Jeffrey (New Zealand) D Soedjasa	19	22	14

=== Bottom half ===
==== Section 3 ====
First Round
(Australia) Pham T H (Australia) R Tang	17	21	21
(New Zealand) J Curtin (New Zealand) R Tong	21	8	6
(New Zealand) Dacmen Vong (New Zealand) E Wong	21	21
(Australia) J Lim (Australia) C Yu	11	8

Second Round
(Australia) Pham T H (Australia) R Tang	19	12
(Australia) K Choo (Australia) Lim M C	21	21
(New Zealand) Dacmen Vong (New Zealand) E Wong	24	21
3	(New Zealand) M Phillips (Australia) E Vuong	22	17

Quarter-finals
(Australia) K Choo (Australia) Lim M C	21	21
(New Zealand) Dacmen Vong (New Zealand) E Wong	19	12

==== Section 4 ====
First Round
(New Zealand) A Sharma (New Zealand) Daxxon Vong	10	21	21
(Australia) K Richardson (Australia) J Yu	21	19	18

Second Round
(New Zealand) A Sharma (New Zealand) Daxxon Vong
(Fiji) J Chung (Australia) Matt Kong	w	/	o
(Australia) J Yang (Australia) F Zhao	21	21
2	(Australia) V Nguyen (Australia) Pham L T H	6	19

Quarter-finals
(Fiji) J Chung (Australia) Matt Kong	8	13
(Australia) J Yang (Australia) F Zhao	21	21

== Women's doubles ==
=== Seeds ===
1. (Australia) Joyce Choong / Sylvina Kurniawan (champion)
2. (New Zealand) Erena Calder-Hawkins / Jasmin Ng (withdrew)

=== Bracket ===
First round
(New Zealand) Angelina Ung (New Zealand) Camellia Zhou	8	21	21
(Australia) Lim Yee-yuan (Australia) Isabella Yan	21	17	15
(New Zealand) Shaunna Li (Australia) Angela Yu
(Australia) Jazmine Lam (Australia) Sydney Tjonadi	w	/	o
(Australia) Tiffany Ho (Australia) Khoo Lee Yen	21	21
(Australia) Joanna Cha (Fiji) Sristi Nadan	7	7
(Australia) Dania Nugroho (Australia) Catrina Tan	22	21
(Australia) Sydney Go (Australia) Teoh Kai Qi	20	19

Quarter-finals
1	(Australia) Joyce Choong (Australia) Sylvina Kurniawan	21	21
(New Zealand) Angelina Ung (New Zealand) Camellia Zhou	6	5
(Australia) Victoria Tjonadi (Australia) Sarah Ung	10	13
(Australia) Jazmine Lam (Australia) Sydney Tjonadi	21	21
(Australia) Tiffany Ho (Australia) Khoo Lee Yen	7	15
(Australia) Kaitlyn Ea (Australia) Gronya Somerville	21	21
(Australia) Dania Nugroho (Australia) Catrina Tan	w	/	o
2	(New Zealand) Erena Calder-Hawkins (New Zealand) Jasmin Ng

Semi-finals
1	(Australia) Joyce Choong (Australia) Sylvina Kurniawan	21	21
(Australia) Jazmine Lam (Australia) Sydney Tjonadi	5	12
(Australia) Kaitlyn Ea (Australia) Gronya Somerville	21	21
(Australia) Dania Nugroho (Australia) Catrina Tan	13	14

Final
1	(Australia) Joyce Choong (Australia) Sylvina Kurniawan	21	21
(Australia) Kaitlyn Ea (Australia) Gronya Somerville	19	15

== Mixed doubles ==
=== Seeds ===
1. (New Zealand) Oliver Leydon-Davis / Anona Pak (final)
2. (Australia) Pham Tran Hoang / Sylvina Kurniawan (second round)
3. (New Zealand) Edward Lau / Shaunna Li (withdrew)
4. (New Zealand) Ryan Tong / Janice Jiang (withdrew)

=== Finals ===
Semi-finals
1	(New Zealand) Oliver Leydon-Davis (New Zealand) Anona Pak	21	23
(Australia) Mitchell Wheller (Australia) Angela Yu	9	21
(Australia) Jordan Yang (Australia) Maureen Wijaya	10	7
(Australia) Kenneth Choo (Australia) Gronya Somerville	21	21

Final
1	(New Zealand) Oliver Leydon-Davis (New Zealand) Anona Pak	18	21	12
(Australia) Kenneth Choo (Australia) Gronya Somerville	21	19	21

=== Top half ===
==== Section 1 ====
First Round
(Australia) R Wang (Australia) Khoo L Y	16	21	21
(Australia) R Tang (Australia) M Almazan	21	18	7
(New Zealand) J Wang (New Zealand) J Villegas	21	21
(Australia) J Schueler (Australia) L Ma	16	19

Second Round
1	(New Zealand) O Leydon-Davis (New Zealand) A Pak	21	21
(Australia) R Wang (Australia) Khoo L Y	14	15
(Australia) C Yu (Australia) I Yan	7	15
(New Zealand) J Wang (New Zealand) J Villegas	21	21

Quarter-finals
1	(New Zealand) O Leydon-Davis (New Zealand) A Pak	21	21
(New Zealand) J Wang (New Zealand) J Villegas	16	12

==== Section 2 ====
First Round
(Australia) Chan J Y (Australia) S Tjonadi	21	14
(Australia) G K Ong (Australia) C Tan	23	21
(Australia) J Lim (Australia) V Tjonadi	8	5
(Australia) M Wheller (Australia) A Yu	21	21
(Australia) Lim M C (Australia) J Choong	21	21
(New Zealand) D Vong (New Zealand) A Ung	15	17

Second Round
4	(New Zealand) R Tong (New Zealand) J Jiang
(Australia) G K Ong (Australia) C Tan	w	/	o
(Australia) M Wheller (Australia) A Yu	4	21	21
(Australia) Lim M C (Australia) J Choong	21	13	14

Quarter-finals
(Australia) G K Ong (Australia) C Tan	21	10	12
(Australia) M Wheller (Australia) A Yu	11	21	21

=== Bottom half ===
==== Section 3 ====
First Round
(Fiji) J Chung (Fiji) S Nadan	4	4
(Australia) Pham L T H (Australia) J Wong	21	21
(Australia) Matthew Kong (Australia) J Chan	14	12
(New Zealand) E Wong (New Zealand) C Zhou	21	21
(Australia) J Yang (Australia) M Wijaya	16	21	21
(Australia) S Dhand (Australia) Lim Y-y	21	19	16

Second Round
(Australia) Pham L T H (Australia) J Wong	18	18
(New Zealand) E Wong (New Zealand) C Zhou	21	21
(Australia) J Yang (Australia) M Wijaya	w	/	o
3	(New Zealand) E Lau (New Zealand) S Li

Quarter-finals
(New Zealand) E Wong (New Zealand) C Zhou	19	14
(Australia) J Yang (Australia) M Wijaya	21	21

==== Section 4 ====
First Round
(Australia) A Gobinathan (Australia) K Ea	21	21
(Australia) F Zhao (Australia) J Lam	11	18
(Australia) J Lee (Australia) Teoh K Q	18	17
(New Zealand) A Jeffrey (New Zealand) E Calder-Hawkins	21	21
(Australia) K Choo (Australia) G Somerville	21	21
(New Zealand) J Curtin (New Zealand) J Ng	13	13

Second Round
(Australia) A Gobinathan (Australia) K Ea	21	21
(New Zealand) A Jeffrey (New Zealand) E Calder-Hawkins	13	11
(Australia) K Choo (Australia) G Somerville	21	21
2	(Australia) Pham T H (Australia) S Kurniawan	15	17

Quarter-finals
(Australia) A Gobinathan (Australia) K Ea	15	17
(Australia) K Choo (Australia) G Somerville	21	21
