= 2019 Sudirman Cup =

2019 world mixed team badminton championships

Tournament details
- Dates: 19–26 May
- Edition: 16th
- Level: International
- Competitors: 377 from 31 nations
- Venue: Guangxi Sports Center
- Location: Nanning, China

The 2019 Sudirman Cup (officially known as the 2019 Total BWF Sudirman Cup for sponsorship reasons) was the 16th edition of the Sudirman Cup, the biennial international badminton championship contested by the mixed national teams of the member associations of Badminton World Federation (BWF), since its inception in 1989. The tournament was played in Nanning, China, between 19 and 26 May 2019. Korea is the defending champion.

China defeated Japan 3–0 in the final to win the tournament.

== Host city selection ==
Nanning was the only bidder for this event. The bid was approved by Badminton World Federation on 18 March 2017 during a meeting in Kuala Lumpur. The city itself won the internal bidding phase by the Chinese Badminton Association, being the preferred city over Nanjing (later chosen to host 2018 BWF World Championships), Qingdao, and Wuhan.

== Seedings ==
The seedings for 32 teams competing in the tournament were announced on 12 March 2019. It was based on aggregated points from the best players in the world ranking as of 5 March 2019. The tournament was divided into four groups, with twelve teams in the elite group competing for the title. Eight teams were seeded into second and third groups and four remaining teams were seeded into fourth group.

On the day of the draw, it was announced that the original list of 32 teams was pared down to 31, with Kenya withdrawing from the tournament. The 31 participating teams were divided into four groups, with Group 1 consisting of the 12 teams that will compete for the title. Group 2 and Group 3 (eight teams each) along with Group 4 (three teams) will fight for overall placings. The draw was held on 19 March 2019.

| Rank | Team | Points | Group | Notes |
|---|---|---|---|---|
| 1 | Japan | 450447 | 1 | |
| 2 | China | 442562 | 1 | |
| 3 | Indonesia | 353008 | 1 | |
| 4 | Chinese Taipei | 331368 | 1 | |
| 5 | South Korea | 301475 | 1 | |
| 6 | Denmark | 293816 | 1 | |
| 7 | Thailand | 293118 | 1 | |
| 8 | India | 262590 | 1 | |
| 9 | Malaysia | 261018 | 1 | |
| 10 | England | 213529 | 1 | |
| 11 | Hong Kong | 205146 | 1 | |
| 12 | Russia | 182260 | 1 | |

| Rank | Team | Points | Group | Notes |
|---|---|---|---|---|
| 13 | Netherlands | 180954 | 2 | |
| 14 | Germany | 161960 | 2 | |
| 15 | Canada | 159971 | 2 | |
| 16 | France | 159030 | 2 | |
| 17 | United States | 137024 | 2 | |
| 18 | Singapore | 116740 | 2 | |
| 19 | Vietnam | 99780 | 2 | |
| 20 | Israel | 79711 | 2 | |
| 21 | Ireland | 78929 | 3 | |
| 22 | Switzerland | 68279 | 3 | |
| 23 | Australia | 60533 | 3 | |
| 24 | Sri Lanka | 45860 | 3 | |

| Rank | Team | Points | Group | Notes |
|---|---|---|---|---|
| 25 | Slovakia | 45254 | 3 | |
| 26 | New Zealand | 35709 | 3 | |
| 27 | Nepal | 27130 | 3 | |
| 28 | Lithuania | 25348 | 3 | |
| 29 | Macau | 23200 | 4 | |
| 30 | Kazakhstan | 20820 | 4 | |
| 31 | Kenya | 4770 | 4 | Withdrawn |
| 32 | Greenland | 2500 | 4 | |

=== Group composition ===
Group 1
| Group 1A | Group 1B | Group 1C | Group 1D |
|---|---|---|---|
| Japan; Thailand; Russia | Indonesia; Denmark; England | Chinese Taipei; South Korea; Hong Kong | China; India; Malaysia |

| Group 2 | | Group 3 | | Group 4 |
| Group 2A | Group 2B | Group 3A | Group 3B | Group 4 |
|---|---|---|---|---|
| Netherlands; France; United States; Vietnam | Germany; Canada; Singapore; Israel | Ireland; Australia; New Zealand; Nepal | Switzerland; Sri Lanka; Slovakia; Lithuania | Macau; Kazakhstan; Greenland |

== Tiebreakers ==
The rankings of teams in each group were determined as follows (regulations Chapter 5 Section 5.1. Article 16.3):

1. Points
2. Results between tied teams
3. Match difference
4. Game difference
5. Point difference

Teams that won 3 match first win the tie: 1 points for the winner, 0 points for the loser.

== Group stage ==
=== Group 1A ===
| Pos | Team | Pld | W | L | MF | MA | MD | GF | GA | GD | PF | PA | PD | Pts | Qualification | Japan | Thailand | Russia |
|---|---|---|---|---|---|---|---|---|---|---|---|---|---|---|---|---|---|---|
| 1 | Japan | 2 | 2 | 0 | 7 | 3 | +4 | 15 | 6 | +9 | 419 | 319 | +100 | 2 | Advance to Quarterfinals | — | 4–1 | 3–2 |
| 2 | Thailand | 2 | 1 | 1 | 4 | 6 | −2 | 9 | 13 | −4 | 368 | 403 | −35 | 1 | Advance to Quarterfinals | | — | 3–2 |
| 3 | Russia | 2 | 0 | 2 | 4 | 6 | −2 | 8 | 13 | −5 | 332 | 397 | −65 | 0 | | | | — |

Source: TS
Rules for classification: Tiebreakers

=== Group 1B ===
| Pos | Team | Pld | W | L | MF | MA | MD | GF | GA | GD | PF | PA | PD | Pts | Qualification | Indonesia | Denmark | England |
|---|---|---|---|---|---|---|---|---|---|---|---|---|---|---|---|---|---|---|
| 1 | Indonesia | 2 | 1 | 1 | 6 | 4 | +2 | 12 | 8 | +4 | 373 | 338 | +35 | 1 | Advance to Quarterfinals | — | 2–3 | 4–1 |
| 2 | Denmark | 2 | 1 | 1 | 5 | 5 | 0 | 13 | 12 | +1 | 467 | 440 | +27 | 1 | Advance to Quarterfinals | | — | 2–3 |
| 3 | England | 2 | 1 | 1 | 4 | 6 | −2 | 10 | 15 | −5 | 417 | 479 | −62 | 1 | | | | — |

Source: TS
Rules for classification: Tiebreakers

=== Group 1C ===
| Pos | Team | Pld | W | L | MF | MA | MD | GF | GA | GD | PF | PA | PD | Pts | Qualification | South Korea | Chinese Taipei for Olympic games | Hong Kong |
|---|---|---|---|---|---|---|---|---|---|---|---|---|---|---|---|---|---|---|
| 1 | South Korea | 2 | 2 | 0 | 7 | 3 | +4 | 15 | 7 | +8 | 422 | 349 | +73 | 2 | Advance to Quarterfinals | — | 3–2 | 4–1 |
| 2 | Chinese Taipei | 2 | 1 | 1 | 5 | 5 | 0 | 12 | 11 | +1 | 415 | 407 | +8 | 1 | Advance to Quarterfinals | | — | 3–2 |
| 3 | Hong Kong | 2 | 0 | 2 | 3 | 7 | −4 | 7 | 16 | −9 | 364 | 445 | −81 | 0 | | | | — |

Source: TS
Rules for classification: Tiebreakers

=== Group 1D ===
| Pos | Team | Pld | W | L | MF | MA | MD | GF | GA | GD | PF | PA | PD | Pts | Qualification | People's Republic of China | Malaysia | India |
|---|---|---|---|---|---|---|---|---|---|---|---|---|---|---|---|---|---|---|
| 1 | China | 2 | 2 | 0 | 10 | 0 | +10 | 20 | 3 | +17 | 481 | 354 | +127 | 2 | Advance to Quarterfinals | — | 5–0 | 5–0 |
| 2 | Malaysia | 2 | 1 | 1 | 3 | 7 | −4 | 9 | 14 | −5 | 399 | 452 | −53 | 1 | Advance to Quarterfinals | | — | 3–2 |
| 3 | India | 2 | 0 | 2 | 2 | 8 | −6 | 5 | 17 | −12 | 362 | 436 | −74 | 0 | | | | — |

Source: TS
Rules for classification: Tiebreakers

=== Group 2A ===
| Pos | Team | Pld | W | L | MF | MA | MD | GF | GA | GD | PF | PA | PD | Pts | Qualification | France | Netherlands | Vietnam | United States |
|---|---|---|---|---|---|---|---|---|---|---|---|---|---|---|---|---|---|---|---|
| 1 | France | 3 | 3 | 0 | 11 | 4 | +7 | 23 | 12 | +11 | 677 | 621 | +56 | 3 | Classification round | — | 3–2 | 4–1 | 4–1 |
| 2 | Netherlands | 3 | 2 | 1 | 10 | 5 | +5 | 22 | 13 | +9 | 679 | 607 | +72 | 2 | Classification round | | — | 3–2 | 5–0 |
| 3 | Vietnam | 3 | 1 | 2 | 6 | 9 | −3 | 15 | 19 | −4 | 606 | 625 | −19 | 1 | Classification round | | | — | 3–2 |
| 4 | United States | 3 | 0 | 3 | 3 | 12 | −9 | 8 | 24 | −16 | 491 | 600 | −109 | 0 | Classification round | | | | — |

Source: TS
Rules for classification: Tiebreakers

=== Group 2B ===
| Pos | Team | Pld | W | L | MF | MA | MD | GF | GA | GD | PF | PA | PD | Pts | Qualification | Canada | Germany | Singapore | Israel |
|---|---|---|---|---|---|---|---|---|---|---|---|---|---|---|---|---|---|---|---|
| 1 | Canada | 3 | 3 | 0 | 11 | 4 | +7 | 22 | 9 | +13 | 619 | 515 | +104 | 3 | Classification round | — | 3–2 | 3–2 | 5–0 |
| 2 | Germany | 3 | 2 | 1 | 8 | 7 | +1 | 18 | 14 | +4 | 594 | 547 | +47 | 2 | Classification round | | — | 3–2 | 3–2 |
| 3 | Singapore | 3 | 1 | 2 | 8 | 7 | +1 | 17 | 14 | +3 | 592 | 518 | +74 | 1 | Classification round | | | — | 4–1 |
| 4 | Israel | 3 | 0 | 3 | 3 | 12 | −9 | 6 | 26 | −20 | 441 | 666 | −225 | 0 | Classification round | | | | — |

Source: TS
Rules for classification: Tiebreakers

=== Group 3A ===
| Pos | Team | Pld | W | L | MF | MA | MD | GF | GA | GD | PF | PA | PD | Pts | Qualification | Ireland | Australia | New Zealand | Nepal |
|---|---|---|---|---|---|---|---|---|---|---|---|---|---|---|---|---|---|---|---|
| 1 | Ireland | 3 | 3 | 0 | 11 | 4 | +7 | 24 | 10 | +14 | 656 | 500 | +156 | 3 | Classification round | — | 3–2 | 3–2 | 5–0 |
| 2 | Australia | 3 | 2 | 1 | 9 | 6 | +3 | 19 | 16 | +3 | 633 | 582 | +51 | 2 | Classification round | | — | 4–1 | 3–2 |
| 3 | New Zealand | 3 | 1 | 2 | 7 | 8 | −1 | 18 | 19 | −1 | 667 | 682 | −15 | 1 | Classification round | | | — | 4–1 |
| 4 | Nepal | 3 | 0 | 3 | 3 | 12 | −9 | 8 | 24 | −16 | 451 | 643 | −192 | 0 | Classification round | | | | — |

Source: TS
Rules for classification: Tiebreakers

=== Group 3B ===
| Pos | Team | Pld | W | L | MF | MA | MD | GF | GA | GD | PF | PA | PD | Pts | Qualification | Sri Lanka | Switzerland | Slovakia | Lithuania |
|---|---|---|---|---|---|---|---|---|---|---|---|---|---|---|---|---|---|---|---|
| 1 | Sri Lanka | 3 | 3 | 0 | 12 | 3 | +9 | 24 | 8 | +16 | 634 | 472 | +162 | 3 | Classification round | — | 3–2 | 4–1 | 5–0 |
| 2 | Switzerland | 3 | 2 | 1 | 11 | 4 | +7 | 25 | 9 | +16 | 672 | 533 | +139 | 2 | Classification round | | — | 5–0 | 4–1 |
| 3 | Slovakia | 3 | 1 | 2 | 5 | 10 | −5 | 12 | 21 | −9 | 538 | 633 | −95 | 1 | Classification round | | | — | 4–1 |
| 4 | Lithuania | 3 | 0 | 3 | 2 | 13 | −11 | 5 | 28 | −23 | 476 | 682 | −206 | 0 | Classification round | | | | — |

Source: TS
Rules for classification: Tiebreakers

=== Group 4 ===
| Pos | Team | Pld | W | L | MF | MA | MD | GF | GA | GD | PF | PA | PD | Pts | Macau | Kazakhstan | Greenland |
|---|---|---|---|---|---|---|---|---|---|---|---|---|---|---|---|---|---|
| 1 | Macau | 2 | 2 | 0 | 8 | 2 | +6 | 18 | 5 | +13 | 456 | 333 | +123 | 2 | — | 3–2 | 5–0 |
| 2 | Kazakhstan | 2 | 1 | 1 | 6 | 4 | +2 | 13 | 12 | +1 | 444 | 427 | +17 | 1 | | — | 4–1 |
| 3 | Greenland | 2 | 0 | 2 | 1 | 9 | −8 | 5 | 19 | −14 | 340 | 480 | −140 | 0 | | | — |

Source: TS
Rules for classification: Tiebreakers

== Knockout stage ==
=== Classification bracket ===
| Thirteenth place match |
| France | 1 |
| Canada | 3 |

| Fifteenth place match |
| Netherlands | 3 |
| Germany | 2 |

| Seventeenth place match |
| Vietnam | 0 |
| Singapore | 3 |

| Nineteenth place match |
| United States | 3 |
| Israel | 1 |

| Twenty-first place match |
| Ireland | 2 |
| Sri Lanka | 3 |

| Twenty-third place match |
| Australia | 2 |
| Switzerland | 3 |

| Twenty-fifth place match |
| New Zealand | 2 |
| Slovakia | 3 |

| Twenty-seventh place match |
| Nepal | 1 |
| Lithuania | 3 |

=== Classification round ===
| Team 1 | Score | Team 2 |
|---|---|---|
| France | 1–3 | Canada |
| Netherlands | 3–2 | Germany |
| Vietnam | 0–3 | Singapore |
| United States | 3–1 | Israel |
| Ireland | 2–3 | Sri Lanka |
| Australia | 2–3 | Switzerland |
| New Zealand | 2–3 | Slovakia |
| Nepal | 1–3 | Lithuania |

=== Final bracket ===
The draw for the quarterfinals was held after the completion of the final matches in the group stage on 22 May 2019.

Quarterfinals
23 May – Nanning
China | 3
Denmark | 1
23 May – Nanning
South Korea | 1
Thailand | 3
24 May – Nanning
Chinese Taipei | 2
Indonesia | 3
24 May – Nanning
Malaysia | 0
Japan | 3

Semifinals
25 May – Nanning
China | 3
Thailand | 0
25 May – Nanning
Indonesia | 1
Japan | 3

Final
26 May – Nanning
China | 3
Japan | 0

=== Quarterfinals ===
| Team 1 | Score | Team 2 |
|---|---|---|
| China | 3–1 | Denmark |
| South Korea | 1–3 | Thailand |
| Chinese Taipei | 2–3 | Indonesia |
| Malaysia | 0–3 | Japan |

=== Semifinals ===
| Team 1 | Score | Team 2 |
|---|---|---|
| China | 3–0 | Thailand |
| Indonesia | 1–3 | Japan |

=== Final ===
| Team 1 | Score | Team 2 |
|---|---|---|
| China | 3–0 | Japan |

2019 Sudirman Cup champions

China
11th title

== Final ranking ==
| Pos | Team | Pld | W | L | Pts | Final result |
|---|---|---|---|---|---|---|
| 1st place, gold medalist(s) | China | 5 | 5 | 0 | 5 | Champions |
| 2nd place, silver medalist(s) | Japan | 5 | 4 | 1 | 4 | Runners-up |
| 3rd place, bronze medalist(s) | Indonesia | 4 | 2 | 2 | 2 | Eliminated in Semifinals |
| 3rd place, bronze medalist(s) | Thailand | 4 | 2 | 2 | 2 | Eliminated in Semifinals |
| 5 | South Korea | 3 | 2 | 1 | 2 | Eliminated in Quarterfinals |
| 6 | Chinese Taipei | 3 | 1 | 2 | 1 | Eliminated in Quarterfinals |
| 7 | Denmark | 3 | 1 | 2 | 1 | Eliminated in Quarterfinals |
| 8 | Malaysia | 3 | 1 | 2 | 1 | Eliminated in Quarterfinals |
| 9 | England | 2 | 1 | 1 | 1 | Eliminated in Group stage |
| 10 | Russia | 2 | 0 | 2 | 0 | Eliminated in Group stage |
| 11 | Hong Kong | 2 | 0 | 2 | 0 | Eliminated in Group stage |
| 12 | India | 2 | 0 | 2 | 0 | Eliminated in Group stage |
| 13 | Canada | 4 | 4 | 0 | 4 | Group 2 |
| 14 | France | 4 | 3 | 1 | 3 | Group 2 |
| 15 | Netherlands | 4 | 3 | 1 | 3 | Group 2 |
| 16 | Germany | 4 | 2 | 2 | 2 | Group 2 |
| 17 | Singapore | 4 | 2 | 2 | 2 | Group 2 |
| 18 | Vietnam | 4 | 1 | 3 | 1 | Group 2 |
| 19 | United States | 4 | 1 | 3 | 1 | Group 2 |
| 20 | Israel | 4 | 0 | 4 | 0 | Group 2 |
| 21 | Sri Lanka | 4 | 4 | 0 | 4 | Group 3 |
| 22 | Ireland | 4 | 3 | 1 | 3 | Group 3 |
| 23 | Switzerland | 4 | 3 | 1 | 3 | Group 3 |
| 24 | Australia | 4 | 2 | 2 | 2 | Group 3 |
| 25 | Slovakia | 4 | 2 | 2 | 2 | Group 3 |
| 26 | New Zealand | 4 | 1 | 3 | 1 | Group 3 |
| 27 | Lithuania | 4 | 1 | 3 | 1 | Group 3 |
| 28 | Nepal | 4 | 0 | 4 | 0 | Group 3 |
| 29 | Macau | 2 | 2 | 0 | 2 | Group 4 |
| 30 | Kazakhstan | 2 | 1 | 1 | 1 | Group 4 |
| 31 | Greenland | 2 | 0 | 2 | 0 | Group 4 |
