= Nepal national badminton team =

National badminton team representing Nepal

Nepal
- Association: Nepal Badminton Association (NBA)
- Confederation: BA (Asia)
- Chairman: Ramji Bahadur Shrestha

BWF ranking
- Current ranking: 81 ▲17 (2 January 2024)
- Highest ranking: 39 (7 January 2020)

Sudirman Cup
- Appearances: 2 (first in 1989)
- Best result: Group stage

Asian Men's Team Championships
- Appearances: 2 (first in 2016)
- Best result: Group stage

The Nepal national badminton team (Nepali: नेपाली राष्ट्रिय ब्याडमिन्टन टिम) represents Nepal in international badminton team competitions. The Nepalese national team is controlled by the Nepal Badminton Association, the governing body for badminton in Nepal.

Nepal competed in the Sudirman Cup in 1989. The mixed team would later compete for a second time in 2019. The men's team participated in the Badminton Asia Team Championships in 2016 and 2018. The Nepalese men's and women's team also compete in the South Asian Games.

== History ==
Badminton was introduced to Nepal in the 1950s when it was widely encouraged as a national sport by King Mahendra of Nepal whom later became the chairman of the Nepal Badminton Association in 1956. The national team was formed soon after the establishment of the Nepal Badminton Association.

The Nepali team started competing in international team tournaments in the 1980s when the men's and women's team took part in qualifying for the Thomas Cup and the Uber Cup respectively. The Nepali men's and women's team also made their Asian Games debut at the 1986 Asian Games. In 1989, the Nepali team made their mixed team debut in the inaugural 1989 Sudirman Cup. The team lost in the group stages.

In 2004, the Nepali men and women's team were sent to compete in the 9th South Asian Games and finished in 4th place. Both teams later competed for the next few Games and finished in third place.

In 2014, the national men's team reached the quarter-finals at the 2014 Asian Games but lost to the Malaysian team with a score of 0-3. The Nepali men's team debuted in the Badminton Asia Team Championships in 2016 and competed for a second time in 2018. In 2019, the national mixed team made their second appearance at the 2019 Sudirman Cup. The team lost the classification round to Lithuania and were placed 28th in the final ranking.

== Competitive record ==
=== Thomas Cup ===
Year	Result
(England) 1949	Did not enter
(Colony of Singapore) 1952	Did not enter
(Colony of Singapore) 1955	Did not enter
(Colony of Singapore) 1958	Did not enter
(Indonesia) 1961	Did not enter
(Japan) 1964	Did not enter
(Indonesia) 1967	Did not enter
(Malaysia) 1970	Did not enter
(Indonesia) 1973	Did not enter
(Thailand) 1976	Did not enter
(Indonesia) 1979	Did not enter
(England) 1982	Did not enter
(Malaysia) 1984	Did not qualify
(Indonesia) 1986	Did not qualify
(Malaysia) 1988	Did not qualify
(Japan) 1990	Did not qualify
(Malaysia) 1992	Did not qualify
(Indonesia) 1994	Did not qualify
(Hong Kong) 1996	Did not enter
(Hong Kong) 1998	Did not qualify
(Malaysia) 2000	Did not qualify
(China) 2002	Did not enter
(Indonesia) 2004	Did not qualify
(Japan) 2006	Did not qualify
(Indonesia) 2008	Did not enter
(Malaysia) 2010	Did not enter
(China) 2012	Did not enter
(India) 2014	Did not enter
(China) 2016	Did not qualify
(Thailand) 2018	Did not qualify
(Denmark) 2020	Did not enter
(Thailand) 2022	Did not enter
(China) 2024	TBD
(N/A) 2026	TBD
(N/A) 2028	TBD
(N/A) 2030	TBD

=== Uber Cup ===
Year	Result
(England) 1957	Did not enter
(United States) 1960	Did not enter
(United States) 1963	Did not enter
(New Zealand) 1966	Did not enter
(Japan) 1969	Did not enter
(Japan) 1972	Did not enter
(Indonesia) 1975	Did not enter
(New Zealand) 1978	Did not enter
(Japan) 1981	Did not enter
(Malaysia) 1984	Did not enter
(Indonesia) 1986	Did not enter
(Malaysia) 1988	Did not qualify
(Japan) 1990	Did not qualify
(Malaysia) 1992	Did not qualify
(Indonesia) 1994	Did not qualify
(Hong Kong) 1996	Did not enter
(Hong Kong) 1998	Did not enter
(Malaysia) 2000	Did not enter
(China) 2002	Did not enter
(Indonesia) 2004	Did not enter
(Japan) 2006	Did not enter
(Indonesia) 2008	Did not enter
(Malaysia) 2010	Did not enter
(China) 2012	Did not enter
(India) 2014	Did not enter
(China) 2016	Did not enter
(Thailand) 2018	Did not enter
(Denmark) 2020	Did not enter
(Thailand) 2022	Did not enter
(China) 2024	TBD
(N/A) 2026	TBD
(N/A) 2028	TBD
(N/A) 2030	TBD

=== Sudirman Cup ===
Year	Result
(Indonesia) 1989	Group 6 Relegated − 25th
(Denmark) 1991	Did not enter
(England) 1993	Did not enter
(Switzerland) 1995	Did not enter
(Scotland) 1997	Did not enter
(Denmark) 1999	Did not enter
(Spain) 2001	Did not enter
(Netherlands) 2003	Did not enter
(China) 2005	Did not enter
(Scotland) 2007	Did not enter
(China) 2009	Did not enter
(China) 2011	Did not enter
(Malaysia) 2013	Did not enter
(China) 2015	Did not enter
(Australia) 2017	Did not enter
(China) 2019	Group 3 − 28th
(Finland) 2021	Did not enter
(China) 2023	Did not enter
(China) 2025	TBD
(N/A) 2027	TBD
(N/A) 2029	TBD

=== Asian Games ===
==== Men's team ====
Year	Result
(Indonesia) 1962	Did not enter
(Thailand) 1966	Did not enter
(Thailand) 1970	Did not enter
(Iran) 1974	Did not enter
(Thailand) 1978	Did not enter
(India) 1982	Did not enter
(South Korea) 1986	Quarter-finals
(China) 1990	Did not enter
(Japan) 1994	Did not enter
(Thailand) 1998	Did not enter
(South Korea) 2002	Did not enter
(Qatar) 2006	Did not enter
(China) 2010	Did not enter
(South Korea) 2014	Quarter-finals
(Indonesia) 2018	Quarter-finals
(China) 2022	Quarter-finals
(Japan) 2026	TBD
(Qatar) 2030	TBD
(Saudi Arabia) 2034	TBD
(N/A) 2038	TBD

==== Women's team ====
Year	Result
(Indonesia) 1962	Did not enter
(Thailand) 1966	Did not enter
(Thailand) 1970	Did not enter
(Iran) 1974	Did not enter
(Thailand) 1978	Did not enter
(India) 1982	Did not enter
(South Korea) 1986	Quarter-finals
(China) 1990	Did not enter
(Japan) 1994	Did not enter
(Thailand) 1998	Did not enter
(South Korea) 2002	Did not enter
(Qatar) 2006	Did not enter
(China) 2010	Did not enter
(South Korea) 2014	Round of 16
(Indonesia) 2018	Round of 16
(China) 2022	Round of 16
(Japan) 2026	TBD
(Qatar) 2030	TBD
(Saudi Arabia) 2034	TBD
(N/A) 2038	TBD

=== Asian Team Championships ===
==== Men's team ====
Year	Result
(Malaysia) 1962	Round of 16
(India) 1965	Quarter-finals
(Philippines) 1969	Did not enter
(Indonesia) 1971	Did not enter
(India) 1976	Did not enter
(India) 1983	Did not enter
(Malaysia) 1985	Did not enter
(Indonesia) 1987	Did not enter
(China) 1989	Did not enter
(Hong Kong) 1993	Did not enter
(Malaysia) 2004	Group stage
(India) 2006	Group stage
(Vietnam) 2008	Did not enter
(Thailand) 2010	Did not enter
(Macau) 2012	Did not enter
(India) 2016	Group stage
(Malaysia) 2018	Group stage
(Philippines) 2020	Did not enter
(Malaysia) 2022	Did not enter
(United Arab Emirates) 2024	TBD
(United Arab Emirates) 2026	TBD
(N/A) 2028	TBD

==== Women's team ====
Year	Result
(Malaysia) 2004	Did not enter
(India) 2006	Did not enter
(Vietnam) 2008	Did not enter
(Thailand) 2010	Did not enter
(Macau) 2012	Did not enter
(India) 2016	Did not enter
(Malaysia) 2018	Did not enter
(Philippines) 2020	Did not enter
(Malaysia) 2022	Did not enter
(United Arab Emirates) 2024	TBD
(United Arab Emirates) 2026	TBD
(N/A) 2028	TBD

==== Mixed team ====
Year	Result
(Vietnam) 2017	Did not enter
(Hong Kong) 2019	Did not enter
(United Arab Emirates) 2023	Did not enter
(United Arab Emirates) 2025	TBD
(United Arab Emirates) 2027	TBD
(N/A) 2029	TBD

=== South Asian Games ===
==== Men's team ====
Year	Result
(Pakistan) 2004	Did not enter
(Sri Lanka) 2006	(bronze) Semi-finals
(Bangladesh) 2010	(bronze) Semi-finals
(India) 2016	Group stage
(Nepal) 2019	(bronze) Semi-finals
(Pakistan) 2024	TBD

==== Women's team ====
Year	Result
(Pakistan) 2004	Did not enter
(Sri Lanka) 2006	(bronze) Semi-finals
(Bangladesh) 2010	(bronze) Semi-finals
(India) 2016	(bronze) Semi-finals
(Nepal) 2019	(bronze) Semi-finals
(Pakistan) 2024	TBD

**Red border color indicates tournament was held on home soil.

== Junior competitive record ==
=== Suhandinata Cup ===
Year	Round	Pos
(China) 2000	Did not enter	
(South Africa) 2002	Did not enter	
(Canada) 2004	Did not enter	
(South Korea) 2006	Did not enter	
(New Zealand) 2007	Did not enter	
(India) 2008	Did not enter	
(Malaysia) 2009	Did not enter	
(Mexico) 2010	Did not enter	
(Chinese Taipei) 2011	Did not enter	
(Japan) 2012	Did not enter	
(Thailand) 2013	Did not enter	
(Malaysia) 2014	Did not enter	
(Peru) 2015	Did not enter	
(Spain) 2016	Did not enter	
(Indonesia) 2017	Group stage	42nd of 44
(Canada) 2018	Did not enter	
(Russia) 2019	Did not enter	
(New Zealand) 2020	Cancelled because of COVID-19 pandemic	
(China) 2021	Cancelled because of COVID-19 pandemic	
(Spain) 2022	Did not enter	
(United States) 2023	Did not enter	
(China) 2024	Did not enter	
(India) 2025	Group stage	31st of 36

=== Asian Junior Team Championships ===
==== Boys' team ====
Year	Result
(Philippines) 1997	Round of 32
(Malaysia) 1998	Did not enter
(Myanmar) 1999	Did not enter
(Japan) 2000	Did not enter
(Chinese Taipei) 2001	Did not enter
(Malaysia) 2002	Did not enter
(South Korea) 2004	Did not enter
(Indonesia) 2005	Did not enter

==== Girls' team ====
Year	Result
(Philippines) 1997	Did not enter
(Malaysia) 1998	Did not enter
(Myanmar) 1999	Did not enter
(Japan) 2000	Did not enter
(Chinese Taipei) 2001	Did not enter
(Malaysia) 2002	Did not enter
(South Korea) 2004	Did not enter
(Indonesia) 2005	Did not enter

==== Mixed team ====
Year	Result
(Malaysia) 2006	Did not enter
(Malaysia) 2007	Did not enter
(Malaysia) 2008	Did not enter
(Malaysia) 2009	Did not enter
(Malaysia) 2010	Did not enter
(India) 2011	Did not enter
(South Korea) 2012	Did not enter
(Malaysia) 2013	Group stage
(Chinese Taipei) 2014	Did not enter
(Thailand) 2015	Group stage
(Thailand) 2016	Did not enter
(Indonesia) 2017	Group stage
(Indonesia) 2018	Did not enter
(China) 2019	Group stage
(Indonesia) 2023	Did not enter
(N/A) 2024	TBD
(N/A) 2025	TBD

=== South Asian Junior Team Championships ===
==== Mixed team ====
Year	Result
(Maldives) 2019	(bronze) Semi-finals

**Red border color indicates tournament was held on home soil.

== Players ==
=== Current squad ===
As of 2 January 2024

==== Men's team ====
Name	DoB/Age	Ranking of event		
Name	DoB/Age	MS	MD	XD
Samyak Shakya	19 June 2004 (age 22)	192	328	973
Praful Maharjan	30 March 2001 (age 25)	484	-	-
Jivan Acharya	17 November 1999 (age 26)	-	233	335
Sunil Joshi	3 December 1999 (age 26)	622	328	-
Bishnu Katwal	13 April 1985 (age 41)	598	233	223

==== Women's team ====
Name	DoB/Age	Ranking of event		
Name	DoB/Age	WS	WD	XD
Rasila Maharjan	20 October 2005 (age 20)	218	294	973
Anu Maya Rai	24 November 1992 (age 33)	356	294	-
Nangsal Tamang	28 December 1987 (age 38)	422	294	223
Nita Lamsal	22 July 2002 (age 24)	-	294	335
Sima Rajbanshi	27 February 2003 (age 23)	-	-	-
