= Uber Cup =

International women's badminton competition

- Current season, competition or edition: 2026 Thomas & Uber Cup
- Sport: Badminton
- Founded: 1957
- No. of teams: 16
- Countries: BWF member nations
- Most recent champion: South Korea (3rd title)
- Most titles: China (16 titles)
- Website: Official website

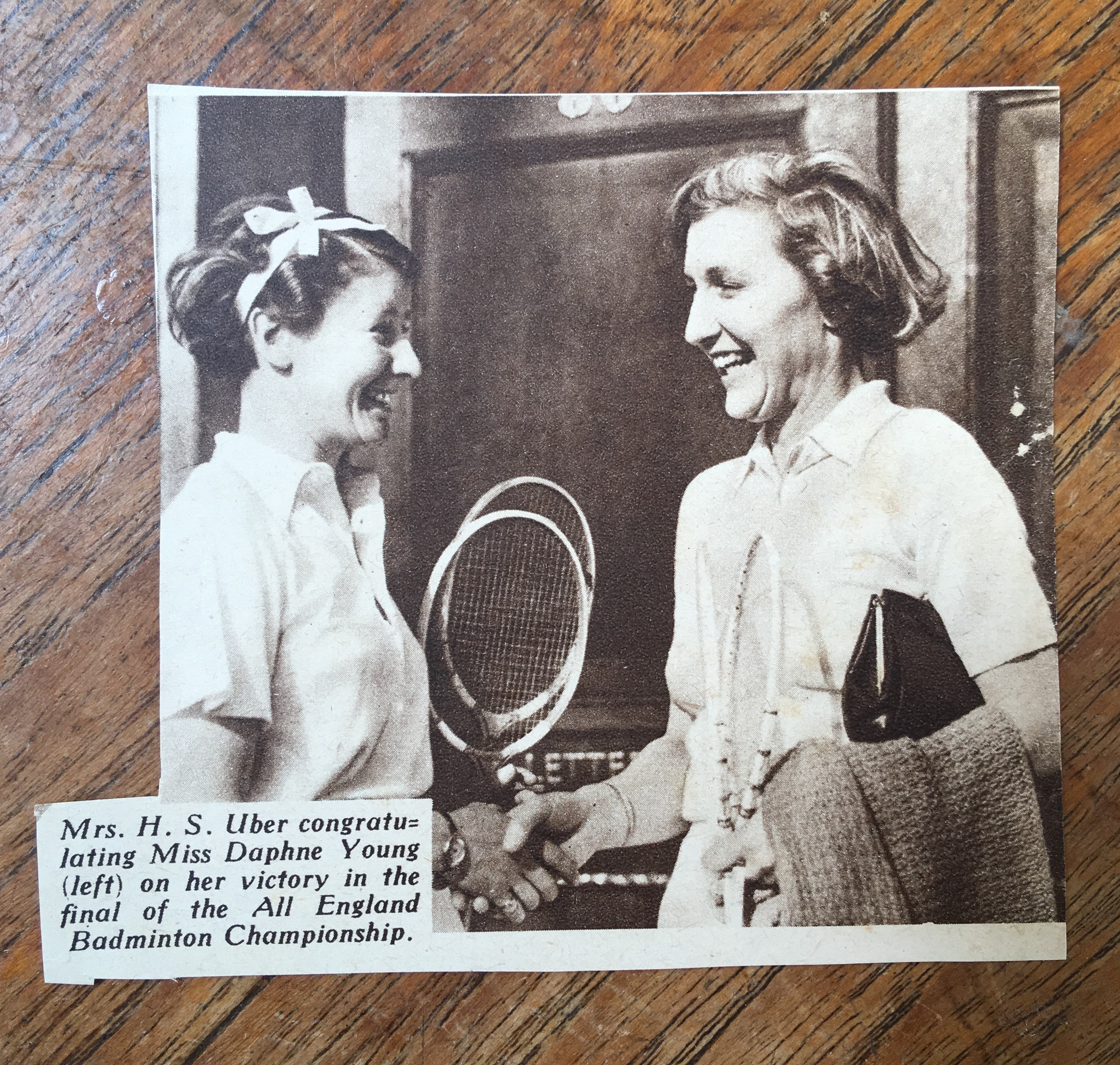
Daphne Young, winner of the All England Badminton Women's Singles Championship, being congratulated by Betty Uber, winner of the mixed doubles (with her partner, Bill White) March 1938

The Uber Cup, sometimes called the World Women's Team Championships, is a major international badminton competition contested by women's national badminton teams. First held in 1956–1957 and contested at three year intervals, it has been contested every two years since 1984 when its scheduled times and venues were merged with those of Thomas Cup, the world men's team championship. In 2007, the Badminton World Federation decided to have Thomas and Uber Cup finals separated again but the proposal was ultimately abandoned. The Uber Cup is named after a former British women's badminton player, Betty Uber, who in 1950 had the idea of hosting a women's event similar to the men's. She also made the draw for the 1956–1957 inaugural tournament, which took place at Lytham St. Annes in Lancashire, England.

The cup follows a similar format to that of the men's competition of the Thomas Cup. As of the 2024 tournament, China is the most successful team, having won 16 titles. Japan is second, having won it six times, followed by Indonesia and United States, each with three cups.

== Trophy ==
The Uber Cup trophy was officially presented at the annual general meeting in 1956, the year the first Uber Cup tournament was first held. It was made by Mappin & Webb, prominent silversmiths on Regent Street in London. The trophy is 20 inches high with a rotating globe on top of a plinth and a female player standing on top of a shuttlecock.

== Results ==
=== 1957–1981 ===
Year	Host	Final			Semi-finalists	
Year	Host	Champions	Score	Runners-up	Semi-finalists	
1957; Details	Lancashire, England	United States	6–1	Denmark	India	
1960; Details	Philadelphia, United States	United States	5–2	Denmark	New Zealand	
1963; Details	Wilmington, United States	United States	4–3	England	Indonesia	
1966; Details	Wellington, New Zealand	Japan	5–2	United States	England	
1969; Details	Tokyo, Japan	Japan	6–1	Indonesia	England	
1972; Details	Tokyo, Japan	Japan	6–1	Indonesia	Denmark	New Zealand
1975; Details	Jakarta, Indonesia	Indonesia	5–2	Japan	Canada	England
1978; Details	Auckland, New Zealand	Japan	5–2	Indonesia	Denmark	United States
1981; Details	Tokyo, Japan	Japan	6–3	Indonesia	Canada	England

=== 1984–1988 ===
Year	Host	Final			Third place tie		
Year	Host	Champions	Score	Runners-up	Third place	Score	Fourth place
1984; Details	Kuala Lumpur, Malaysia	China	5–0	England	South Korea	5–0	Denmark
1986; Details	Jakarta, Indonesia	China	3–2	Indonesia	South Korea	3–2	Japan
1988; Details	Kuala Lumpur, Malaysia	China	5–0	South Korea	Indonesia	5–0	Japan

=== 1990–present ===
Year	Host	Final			Semi-finalists	
Year	Host	Champions	Score	Runners-up	Semi-finalists	
1990; Details	Nagoya and Tokyo, Japan	China	3–2	South Korea	Indonesia	Japan
1992; Details	Kuala Lumpur, Malaysia	China	3–2	South Korea	Sweden	Indonesia
1994; Details	Jakarta, Indonesia	Indonesia	3–2	China	Sweden	South Korea
1996; Details	Hong Kong	Indonesia	4–1	China	South Korea	Denmark
1998; Details	Hong Kong SAR, China	China	4–1	Indonesia	Denmark	South Korea
2000; Details	Kuala Lumpur, Malaysia	China	3–0	Denmark	Indonesia	South Korea
2002; Details	Guangzhou, China	China	3–1	South Korea	Netherlands	Hong Kong
2004; Details	Jakarta, Indonesia	China	3–1	South Korea	Denmark	Japan
2006; Details	Sendai and Tokyo, Japan	China	3–0	Netherlands	Germany	Chinese Taipei
2008; Details	Jakarta, Indonesia	China	3–0	Indonesia	South Korea	Germany
2010; Details	Kuala Lumpur, Malaysia	South Korea	3–1	China	Japan	Indonesia
2012; Details	Wuhan, China	China	3–0	South Korea	Thailand	Japan
2014; Details	New Delhi, India	China	3–1	Japan	India	South Korea
2016; Details	Kunshan, China	China	3–1	South Korea	India	Japan
2018; Details	Bangkok, Thailand	Japan	3–0	Thailand	South Korea	China
2020; Details	Aarhus, Denmark	China	3–1	Japan	South Korea	Thailand
2022; Details	Bangkok, Thailand	South Korea	3–2	China	Japan	Thailand
2024; Details	Chengdu, China	China	3–0	Indonesia	South Korea	Japan
2026; Details	Horsens, Denmark	South Korea	3–1	China	Japan	Indonesia

== Successful national teams ==
So far, only five countries have won the Uber Cup with China the most successful team, with 16 titles, followed by Japan (six titles), Indonesia (three titles), the United States (three titles) and Korea (two titles). The Uber Cup has only spread to two continents so far: Asia and North America.

Nine teams have made it into the finals. The finalists other than the five winner countries above are Denmark, England, the Netherlands and Thailand. Sweden, Hong Kong, Germany, Chinese Taipei and India are the other fives teams which have made it into the final four.

Teams	Titles	Runners-up	Semi-finalists	Third place	Fourth place	Top 4 total
China	16 (1984, 1986, 1988, 1990, 1992, 1998, 2000, **2002**, 2004, 2006, 2008, **2012**, 2014, **2016**, 2020, **2024**)	5 (1994, 1996, 2010, 2022, 2026)	1 (2018)	—N/a	—N/a	22
Japan	6 (1966, **1969**, **1972**, 1978, **1981**, 2018)	3 (1975, 2014, 2020)	8 (**1990**, 2004, 2010, 2012, 2016, 2022, 2024, 2026)	—N/a	2 (1986, 1988)	19
Indonesia	3 (**1975**, **1994**, 1996)	8 (1969, 1972, 1978, 1981, **1986**, 1998, **2008**, 2024)	5 (1990, 1992, 2000, 2010, 2026)	1 (1988)	—N/a	17
South Korea	3 (2010, 2022, 2026)	7 (1988, 1990, 1992, 2002, 2004, 2012, 2016)	9 (1994, 1996, 1998, 2000, 2008, 2014, 2018, 2020, 2024)	2 (1984, 1986)	—N/a	21
United States	3 (1957, **1960**, **1963**)	1 (1966)	—N/a	—N/a	—N/a	4
Denmark	—N/a	3 (1957, 1960, 2000)	3 (1996, 1998, 2004)	—N/a	1 (1984)	7
England	—N/a	2 (1963, 1984)	—N/a	—N/a	—N/a	2
Thailand	—N/a	1 (**2018**)	3 (2012, 2020, **2022**)	—N/a	—N/a	4
Netherlands	—N/a	1 (2006)	1 (2002)	—N/a	—N/a	2
Sweden	—N/a	—N/a	2 (1992, 1994)	—N/a	—N/a	2
Germany	—N/a	—N/a	2 (2006, 2008)	—N/a	—N/a	2
India	—N/a	—N/a	2 (**2014**, 2016)	—N/a	—N/a	2
Hong Kong	—N/a	—N/a	1 (2002)	—N/a	—N/a	1
Chinese Taipei	—N/a	—N/a	1 (2006)	—N/a	—N/a	1

Bold text denotes team was host country.

== Team appearances at the final stages ==
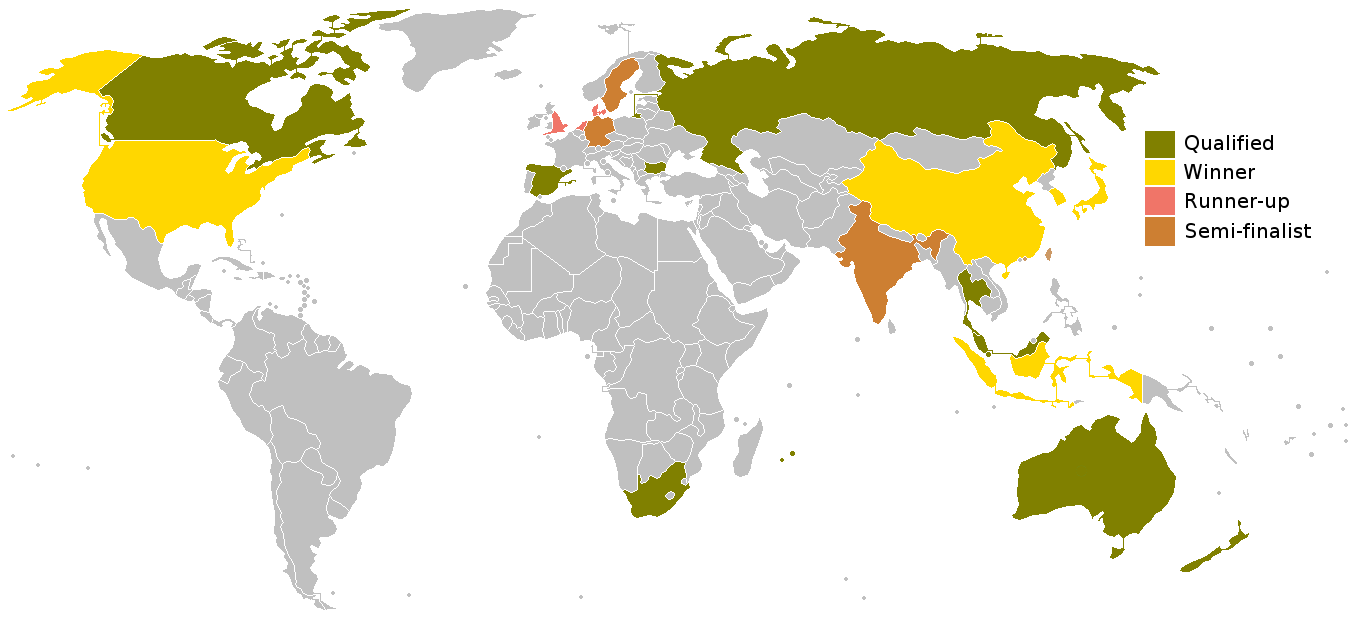
Map showing countries that qualified for the final stages of the Uber Cup

As of 2026, 32 teams have qualified in the history of the competition for the final stages of the Uber Cup. Europe are the continent with the most teams, at twelve. Asia had ten teams. Africa had four teams that qualified, followed by Oceania and Pan America with three teams each.

Below is the list of teams that have appeared in the final stage of Uber Cup as of the 2026 tournament.

Teams	Region	Appearances	Debut	Best Result
Indonesia	Asia	28	1963	Champions
Japan	Asia	28	1966	Champions
Denmark	Europe	24	1957	Runners-up
China	Asia	22	1984	Champions
South Korea	Asia	22	1984	Champions
Malaysia	Asia	16	1975	Quarter-finals
Canada	Americas	15	1960	Semi-finals
England	Europe	14	1963	Runners-up
United States	Americas	13	1957	Champions
Australia	Oceania	11	1975	Group stage
Germany	Europe	11	2002	Semi-finals
India	Asia	10	1957	Semi-finals
Thailand	Asia	10	1969	Runners-up
Netherlands	Europe	10	1988	Runners-up
Chinese Taipei	Asia	10	2004	Semi-finals
Hong Kong	Asia	9	1996	Semi-finals
New Zealand	Oceania	6	1960	Semi-finals
South Africa	Africa	6	2004	Group stage
Sweden	Europe	5	1992	Semi-finals
Russia	Europe	5	2010	Quarter-finals
Spain	Europe	4	2016	Group stage
Singapore	Asia	3	2006	Quarter-finals
France	Europe	3	2018	Group stage
Mauritius	Africa	2	2016	Group stage
Bulgaria	Europe	2	2016	Group stage
Egypt	Africa	2	2020	Group stage
Scotland	Europe	1	2020	Group stage
Tahiti	Oceania	1	2020	Group stage
Mexico	Americas	1	2024	Group stage
Uganda	Africa	1	2024	Group stage
Turkey	Europe	1	2026	Group stage
Ukraine	Europe	1	2026	Group stage
