= Abhinav Manota =

New Zealand badminton player (born 1992)

Personal information
- Born: 7 April 1992 (age 34) Jalandhar, India
- Height: 1.83 m (6 ft 0 in)

Sport
- Country: India; New Zealand (2014–present)
- Sport: Badminton
- Handedness: Right

Men's singles & men's doubles
- Highest ranking: 100 (MS 9 August 2018); 70 (MD 3 March 2020)
- Current ranking: 102 (MS); 81 (MD with Leydon-Davis) (3 May 2022)
- BWF profile
Medal record
Men's badminton
Representing New Zealand
Oceania Championships
Gold medal – first place	2018 Hamilton	Men's singles
Gold medal – first place	2020 Ballarat	Men's singles
Gold medal – first place	2020 Ballarat	Men's doubles
Gold medal – first place	2022 Melbourne	Men's doubles
Gold medal – first place	2023 Auckland	Men's singles
Bronze medal – third place	2019 Melbourne	Men's singles
Oceania Mixed Team Championships
Silver medal – second place	2019 Melbourne	Mixed team
Silver medal – second place	2023 Auckland	Mixed team
Oceania Men's Team Championships
Silver medal – second place	2018 Hamilton	Men's team
Silver medal – second place	2020 Ballarat	Men's team

Abhinav Manota (born 7 April 1992) is an Indian-born New Zealand badminton player. He won four Oceania Championships title, two in the men's singles, and two in the men's doubles.

== Personal life ==
Manota is an Indian immigrant who came to New Zealand in 2014, to study Diploma in Business and Enterprise Management from Abacus Institute of Studies. He settled in Christchurch and representing Canterbury in the New Zealand national events.

== Achievements ==
=== Oceania Championships ===
Men's singles
Year	Venue	Opponent	Score	Result
2018	Eastlink Badminton Stadium, Hamilton, New Zealand	(French Polynesia) Rémi Rossi	21–12, 21–14	Gold
2019	Melbourne Sports and Aquatic Centre, Melbourne, Australia	(French Polynesia) Rémi Rossi	10–21, 18–21	Bronze
2020	Ken Kay Badminton Stadium, Ballarat, Australia	(New Zealand) Edward Lau	21–17, 21–15	Gold
2023	Auckland Badminton Stadium, Auckland, New Zealand	(New Zealand) Edward Lau	21–12, 21–16	Gold

Men's doubles
Year	Venue	Partner	Opponent	Score	Result
2020	Ken Kay Badminton Stadium; Ballarat, Australia	(New Zealand) Oliver Leydon-Davis	(Australia) Matthew Chau (Australia) Sawan Serasinghe	18–21, 21–9, 21–14	Gold
2022	Melbourne Sports and Aquatic Centre; Melbourne, Australia	(New Zealand) Jack Wang	(Australia) Kenneth Choo (Australia) Lim Ming Chuen	21–14, 23–21	Gold

=== BWF International Challenge/Series (6 runners-up) ===
Men's singles
Year	Tournament	Opponent	Score	Result
2018	North Harbour International	(New Zealand) Oscar Guo	14–21, 10–21	(silver) Runner-up
2019	Bulgarian Open	(France) Toma Junior Popov	15–21, 10–21	(silver) Runner-up

Men's doubles
Year	Tournament	Partner	Opponent	Score	Result
2019	Dutch International	(New Zealand) Oliver Leydon-Davis	(Denmark) Daniel Lundggard (Denmark) Mathias Thyrri	16–21, 21–15, 14–21	(silver) Runner-up
2019	Hellas Open	(New Zealand) Oliver Leydon-Davis	(France) Éloi Adam (France) Julien Maio	18–21, 18–21	(silver) Runner-up
2019	Bulgarian Open	(New Zealand) Oliver Leydon-Davis	(France) Éloi Adam (France) Julien Maio	21–10, 16–21, 12–21	(silver) Runner-up

Mixed doubles
Year	Tournament	Partner	Opponent	Score	Result
2016	Waikato International	(New Zealand) Justine Villegas	(New Zealand) Kevin Dennerly-Minturn (New Zealand) Susannah Leydon-Davis	13–21, 14–21	(silver) Runner-up

BWF International Challenge tournament
BWF International Series tournament
BWF Future Series tournament
