= 1992 Thomas Cup qualification =

Tournament details
- Dates: 16 – 24 February 1992
- Location: Asian zone: Hong Kong; European zone: 's-Hertogenbosch

The qualifying process for the 1992 Thomas Cup took place from 16 to 24 February 1992 to decide the final teams which would play in the final tournament.

== Qualification process ==
The qualification process was divided into two regions, the Asian Zone and the European Zone. Seeded teams received a bye into the second round while unseeded teams competed in the first round for a place in the second round. The first two rounds were played in a round-robin format. Teams in the second round competed for a place in the knockout stages. Semi-final winners in each zone were guaranteed qualification for the final tournament to be held in Kuala Lumpur while the remaining teams competed in a third place playoff match for a place in the final tournament.

China qualified for the final tournament as defending champions while Malaysia qualified as hosts.

=== Qualified teams ===
| Country | Qualified as | Qualified on | Final appearance |
|---|---|---|---|
| Malaysia | 1992 Thomas Cup hosts | 22 October 1990 | 14th |
| China | 1990 Thomas Cup winners | 3 June 1990 | 6th |
| Indonesia | Asian Zone winners | 24 February 1992 | 14th |
| South Korea | Asian Zone runners-up | 24 February 1992 | 5th |
| Thailand | Third place in Asian Zone | 24 February 1992 | 6th |
| Denmark | European Zone winners | 24 February 1992 | 17th |
| Sweden | European Zone runners-up | 24 February 1992 | 5th |
| England | Third place in European Zone | 24 February 1992 | 6th |

== Asian Zone ==
The qualification rounds for the Asian Zone were held from 16 to 24 February at Queen Elizabeth Stadium in Hong Kong. Sixteen teams took part in qualifying for the final tournament, with Tanzania making their debut in the tournament. Nepal withdrew from the tournament.

=== First round ===
==== Group A ====
| Pos | Team | Pld | W | L | MF | MA | MD | Pts | Qualification |
|---|---|---|---|---|---|---|---|---|---|
| 1 | India | 3 | 3 | 0 | 14 | 1 | +13 | 3 | Advance to second round |
| 2 | Singapore | 3 | 2 | 1 | 11 | 5 | +6 | 2 | |
| 3 | Pakistan | 3 | 1 | 2 | 4 | 11 | −7 | 1 | |
| 4 | Philippines | 3 | 0 | 3 | 1 | 13 | −12 | 0 | |

Source: The Straits Times

India
5
Queen Elizabeth Stadium
16 February 1992

Pakistan
0

| | | Result |
|---|---|---|---|
| 1 | Rajeev Bagga | 2 – 0 | Mirza Ali Yar Beg |
| 2 | Dipankar Bhattacharjee | 2 – 0 | Mohammed Saqib Majeed |
| 3 | George Thomas | 2 – 1 | Amir Islam |
| 4 | U. Vinod Kumar; Uday Pawar | 2 – 0 | Mirza Ali Yar Beg; Mohammed Saqib Majeed |
| 5 | Rajeev Bagga; Praveen Kumar | 2 – 0 | Amir Islam; Shakeel Hayat Mir |

Singapore
5
Queen Elizabeth Stadium
16 February 1992

Philippines
0

| | | Result |
|---|---|---|---|
| 1 | Abdul Hamid Khan | 2 – 0 (15–0, 15–11) | Rocky Magnaye |
| 2 | Donald Koh | 2 – 0 (15–4, 15–6) | Antonio Mance Jr. |
| 3 | You Kok Kiong | 2 – 0 (15–10, 15–10) | Jethanan Ramnani |
| 4 | Abdul Hamid Khan; Lim Boon Leng | 2 – 0 (15–4, 15–3) | Anthony Ave; Ricardo Santos |
| 5 | Patrick Lau; Lim Hong Han | 2 – 0 (15–11, 15–10) | Jethanan Ramnani; Jacques Zialcita |

India
5
Queen Elizabeth Stadium
17 February 1992

Philippines
0

| | | Result |
|---|---|---|---|
| 1 | Rajeev Bagga | 2 – 0 | Rocky Magnaye |
| 2 | Dipankar Bhattacharjee | 2 – 0 | Antonio Mance Jr. |
| 3 | George Thomas | 2 – 0 | Jethanan Ramnani |
| 4 | U. Vinod Kumar; Uday Pawar | 2 – 0 | Anthony Ave; Ricardo Santos |
| 5 | Rajeev Bagga; Praveen Kumar | 2 – 1 | Jethanan Ramnani; Jacques Zialcita |

Singapore
5
Queen Elizabeth Stadium
17 February 1992

Pakistan
0

| | | Result |
|---|---|---|---|
| 1 | Abdul Hamid Khan | 2 – 0 (15–10, 15–9) | Mirza Ali Yar Beg |
| 2 | Donald Koh | 2 – 0 (15–10, 15–4) | Mohammed Saqib Majeed |
| 3 | You Kok Kiong | 2 – 0 (15–2, 18–13) | Amir Islam |
| 4 | Abdul Hamid Khan; Lim Boon Leng | 2 – 0 (15–9, 15–7) | Mirza Ali Yar Beg; Mohammed Saqib Majeed |
| 5 | Patrick Lau; Lim Hong Han | 2 – 0 (15–4, 15–1) | Amir Islam; Shakeel Hayat Mir |

India
4
Queen Elizabeth Stadium
18 February 1992

Singapore
1

| | | Result |
|---|---|---|---|
| 1 | Rajeev Bagga | 2 – 0 (17–16, 15–2) | Abdul Hamid Khan |
| 2 | Dipankar Bhattacharjee | 2 – 1 (15–10, 7–15, 15–8) | Donald Koh |
| 3 | Praveen Kumar | 2 – 0 (15–5, 15–2) | You Kok Kiong |
| 4 | U. Vinod Kumar; Uday Pawar | 1 – 2 (14–17, 15–5, 10–15) | Abdul Hamid Khan; Lim Boon Leng |
| 5 | Rajeev Bagga; Praveen Kumar | 2 – 0 (17–14, 15–9) | Patrick Lau; Lim Hong Han |

Pakistan
4
Queen Elizabeth Stadium
18 February 1992

Philippines
1

| | | Result |
|---|---|---|---|
| 1 | Mirza Ali Yar Beg | 2 – 0 | Rocky Magnaye |
| 2 | Mohammed Saqib Majeed | 2 – 0 | Antonio Mance Jr. |
| 3 | Amir Islam | 2 – 1 | Jethanan Ramnani |
| 4 | Mirza Ali Yar Beg; Mohammed Saqib Majeed | 2 – 0 | Anthony Ave; Ricardo Santos |
| 5 | Amir Islam; Shakeel Hayat Mir | 0 – 2 | Jethanan Ramnani; Jacques Zialcita |

==== Group B ====
| Pos | Team | Pld | W | L | MF | MA | MD | Pts | Qualification |
|---|---|---|---|---|---|---|---|---|---|
| 1 | New Zealand | 2 | 2 | 0 | 10 | 0 | +10 | 2 | Advance to second round |
| 2 | Macau | 2 | 1 | 1 | 3 | 7 | −4 | 1 | |
| 3 | Guatemala | 2 | 0 | 2 | 2 | 8 | −6 | 0 | |
| 4 | Nepal | 0 | 0 | 0 | 0 | 0 | 0 | 0 | Withdrew |

Source: The Straits Times

New Zealand
5
Queen Elizabeth Stadium
16 February 1992

Macau
0

| | | Result |
|---|---|---|---|
| 1 | Nick Hall | 2 – 0 (15–6, 15–2) | Teng Shih Ee |
| 2 | Grant Walker | 2 – 0 (15–2, 15–3) | Leong Pui Lin |
| 3 | Brent Chapman | 2 – 0 (15–1, 15–3) | Joaquim Lobo |
| 4 | Dean Galt; Kerrin Harrison | 2 – 0 (15–8, 15–4) | Iek Weng Kai; Sam Kin Chong |
| 5 | Nick Hall; Grant Walker | 2 – 0 (15–2, 15–2) | Mak Weng Heng; Sam Kai Chong |

Macau
3
Queen Elizabeth Stadium
17 February 1992

Guatemala
2

| | | Result |
|---|---|---|---|
| 1 | Sam Kai Chong | 0 – 2 | Kenneth Erichsen |
| 2 | Teng Shih Ee | 2 – 1 | Raúl Martínez |
| 3 | Joaquim Lobo | 2 – 1 | Renato Rosales |
| 4 | Iek Weng Kai; Sam Kin Chong | 1 – 2 | Kenneth Erichsen; Renato Rosales |
| 5 | Mak Weng Heng; Sam Kai Chong | 2 – 0 | Leonel Barrios; Raúl Martínez |

New Zealand
5
Queen Elizabeth Stadium
18 February 1992

Guatemala
0

| | | Result |
|---|---|---|---|
| 1 | Nick Hall | 2 – 0 | Kenneth Erichsen |
| 2 | Grant Walker | 2 – 0 | Raúl Martínez |
| 3 | Brent Chapman | 2 – 0 | Renato Rosales |
| 4 | Dean Galt; Kerrin Harrison | 2 – 0 | Kenneth Erichsen; Renato Rosales |
| 5 | Nick Hall; Grant Walker | 2 – 0 | Leonel Barrios; Raúl Martínez |

==== Group C ====
| Pos | Team | Pld | W | L | MF | MA | MD | Pts | Qualification |
|---|---|---|---|---|---|---|---|---|---|
| 1 | Hong Kong | 3 | 3 | 0 | 11 | 4 | +7 | 3 | Advance to second round |
| 2 | Australia | 3 | 2 | 1 | 11 | 4 | +7 | 2 | |
| 3 | Sri Lanka | 3 | 1 | 2 | 8 | 7 | +1 | 1 | |
| 4 | Tanzania | 3 | 0 | 3 | 0 | 15 | −15 | 0 | |

Source: The Straits Times

Hong Kong
5
Queen Elizabeth Stadium
16 February 1992

Tanzania
0

| | | Result |
|---|---|---|---|
| 1 | Chan Kin Ngai | 2 – 0 (15–1, 15–1) | Mohamed Juma |
| 2 | Wong Wai Lap | 2 – 0 (15–0, 15–0) | Mehul Joshi |
| 3 | Tse Bun | 2 – 0 (15–0, 15–0) | Nishit Sangani |
| 4 | Chow Kin Man; Ng Pak Kum | 2 – 0 (15–4, 15–2) | Mohamed Juma; Mukesh Shah |
| 5 | Chan Siu Kwong; Tse Bun | 2 – 0 (15–0, 15–5) | Mehul Joshi; Shah Nanaz |

Australia
4
Queen Elizabeth Stadium
16 February 1992

Sri Lanka
1

| | | Result |
|---|---|---|---|
| 1 | Wei Yan | 2 – 0 | Niroshan Wijekoon |
| 2 | Mark Nichols | 1 – 2 | Duminda Jayakody |
| 3 | Murray Hocking | 2 – 0 | Nishantha Jayasinghe |
| 4 | Peter Blackburn; Wei Yan | 2 – 0 | Duminda Jayakody; Niroshan Wijekoon |
| 5 | Mark Nichols; Andrew Perks | 2 – 0 | Nishantha Jayasinghe; Niranjan Wijesekera |

Hong Kong
5
Queen Elizabeth Stadium
17 February 1992

Sri Lanka
0

| | | Result |
|---|---|---|---|
| 1 | Chan Kin Ngai | 2 – 0 | Niroshan Wijekoon |
| 2 | Wong Wai Lap | 2 – 0 | Duminda Jayakody |
| 3 | Chan Wing Kit | 2 – 0 | Nishantha Jayasinghe |
| 4 | Chow Kin Man; Ng Pak Kum | 2 – 0 | Duminda Jayakody; Niroshan Wijekoon |
| 5 | Chan Siu Kwong; Tse Bun | 2 – 0 | Nishantha Jayasinghe; Niranjan Wijesekera |

Australia
5
Queen Elizabeth Stadium
17 February 1992

Tanzania
0

| | | Result |
|---|---|---|---|
| 1 | Wei Yan | 2 – 0 (15–1, 15–1) | Mohamed Juma |
| 2 | Mark Nichols | 2 – 0 (15–0, 15–3) | Shah Nanaz |
| 3 | Murray Hocking | 2 – 0 (15–1, 15–0) | Nishit Sangani |
| 4 | Mark Nichols; Andrew Perks | 2 – 0 (15–0, 15–0) | Mehul Joshi; Nishit Sangani |
| 5 | Peter Blackburn; Murray Hocking | 2 – 0 (15–1, 15–0) | Mohamed Juma; Mukesh Shah |

Hong Kong
3
Queen Elizabeth Stadium
18 February 1992

Australia
2

| | | Result |
|---|---|---|---|
| 1 | Chan Kin Ngai | 0 – 2 (9–15, 15–18) | Wei Yan |
| 2 | Wong Wai Lap | 2 – 0 (15–1, 15–3) | Mark Nichols |
| 3 | Tse Bun | 2 – 0 (15–11, 15–12) | Murray Hocking |
| 4 | Chan Siu Kwong; Ng Pak Kum | 2 – 0 (15–12, 17–16) | Peter Blackburn; Wei Yan |
| 5 | Chan Kin Ngai; Chow Kin Man | 0 – 2 (11–15, 9–15) | Mark Nichols; Andrew Perks |

Sri Lanka
5
Queen Elizabeth Stadium
18 February 1992

Tanzania
0

| | | Result |
|---|---|---|---|
| 1 | Niroshan Wijekoon | 2 – 0 | Mohamed Juma |
| 2 | Duminda Jayakody | 2 – 0 | Mehul Joshi |
| 3 | Nishantha Jayasinghe | 2 – 0 | Shah Nanaz |
| 4 | Duminda Jayakody; Niroshan Wijekoon | 2 – 0 | Mohamed Juma; Mukesh Shah |
| 5 | Nishantha Jayasinghe; Niranjan Wijesekera | 2 – 0 | Shah Nanaz; Nishit Sangani |

=== Second round ===
==== Group X ====
| Pos | Team | Pld | W | L | MF | MA | MD | Pts | Qualification |
|---|---|---|---|---|---|---|---|---|---|
| 1 | Indonesia | 3 | 3 | 0 | 15 | 0 | +15 | 3 | Advance to knockout stage |
| 2 | Chinese Taipei | 3 | 2 | 1 | 7 | 8 | −1 | 2 | Advance to knockout stage |
| 3 | Japan | 3 | 1 | 2 | 4 | 11 | −7 | 1 | |
| 4 | Hong Kong | 3 | 0 | 3 | 4 | 11 | −7 | 0 | |

Source: The Straits Times

Indonesia
5
Queen Elizabeth Stadium
19 February 1992

Chinese Taipei
0

| | | Result |
|---|---|---|---|
| 1 | Ardy Wiranata | 2 – 0 (15–2, 15–7) | Liu En-hung |
| 2 | Hermawan Susanto | 2 – 0 (15–4, 15–4) | Lin Shyua-hsin |
| 3 | Joko Suprianto | 2 – 0 (15–7, 15–6) | Lin Wei-chen |
| 4 | Rudy Gunawan; Eddy Hartono | 2 – 0 (15–9, 15–3) | Horng Shin-jeng; Horng Wen-i |
| 5 | Rexy Mainaky; Ricky Subagja | 2 – 0 (15–6, 15–5) | Liu En-hung; Yang Shih-jeng |

Japan
3
Queen Elizabeth Stadium
19 February 1992

Hong Kong
2

| | | Result |
|---|---|---|---|
| 1 | Hiroki Etō | 0 – 2 (8–15, 6–15) | Chan Kin Ngai |
| 2 | Shinji Matsuura | 1 – 2 (15–6, 13–15, 2–15) | Wong Wai Lap |
| 3 | Shuji Matsuno | 2 – 0 (15–4, 15–10) | Chan Wing Kit |
| 4 | Fumihiko Machida; Koji Miya | 2 – 0 (15–11, 15–13) | Chow Kin Man; Ng Pak Kum |
| 5 | Shuji Matsuno; Shinji Matsuura | 2 – 0 (15–4, 15–3) | Chan Siu Kwong; Tse Bun |

Indonesia
5
Queen Elizabeth Stadium
20 February 1992

Hong Kong
0

| | | Result |
|---|---|---|---|
| 1 | Alan Budikusuma | 2 – 0 (15–1, 15–7) | Tse Bun |
| 2 | Bambang Suprianto | 2 – 0 (15–2, 15–4) | Ng Liang Hua |
| 3 | Joko Suprianto | 2 – 0 (15–2, 15–2) | Chan Wing Kit |
| 4 | Rudy Gunawan; Eddy Hartono | 2 – 0 (15–7, 15–1) | Chan Siu Kwong; Wong Wai Lap |
| 5 | Rexy Mainaky; Ricky Subagja | 2 – 0 (15–3, 15–7) | Chan Kin Ngai; Ng Pak Kum |

Japan
1
Queen Elizabeth Stadium
20 February 1992

Chinese Taipei
4

| | | Result |
|---|---|---|---|
| 1 | Fumihiko Machida | 1 – 2 | Lee Mou-chou |
| 2 | Hiroki Etō | 0 – 2 | Liu En-hung |
| 3 | Shuji Matsuno | 1 – 2 | Lin Wei-chen |
| 4 | Fumihiko Machida; Koji Miya | 1 – 2 | Horng Shin-jeng; Horng Wen-i |
| 5 | Shuji Matsuno; Shinji Matsuura | 2 – 0 | Liu En-hung; Yang Shih-jeng |

Indonesia
5
Queen Elizabeth Stadium
21 February 1992

Japan
0

| | | Result |
|---|---|---|---|
| 1 | Ardy Wiranata | 2 – 0 | Fumihiko Machida |
| 2 | Alan Budikusuma | 2 – 0 | Hiroki Etō |
| 3 | Hermawan Susanto | 2 – 0 | Shuji Matsuno |
| 4 | Rudy Gunawan; Eddy Hartono | 2 – 0 | Fumihiko Machida; Koji Miya |
| 5 | Rexy Mainaky; Ricky Subagja | 2 – 0 | Shuji Matsuno; Shinji Matsuura |

Chinese Taipei
3
Queen Elizabeth Stadium
21 February 1992

Hong Kong
2

| | | Result |
|---|---|---|---|
| 1 | Lee Mou-chou | 2 – 1 | Chan Kin Ngai |
| 2 | Liu En-hung | 1 – 2 | Wong Wai Lap |
| 3 | Lin Wei-chen | 2 – 0 | Chan Wing Kit |
| 4 | Horng Shin-jeng; Horng Wen-i | 1 – 2 | Chow Kin Man; Ng Pak Kum |
| 5 | Liu En-hung; Yang Shih-jeng | 2 – 0 | Chan Siu Kwong; Tse Bun |

==== Group Y ====
| Pos | Team | Pld | W | L | MF | MA | MD | Pts | Qualification |
|---|---|---|---|---|---|---|---|---|---|
| 1 | South Korea | 3 | 3 | 0 | 13 | 2 | +11 | 3 | Advance to knockout stage |
| 2 | Thailand | 3 | 2 | 1 | 10 | 5 | +5 | 2 | Advance to knockout stage |
| 3 | India | 3 | 1 | 2 | 7 | 8 | −1 | 1 | |
| 4 | New Zealand | 3 | 0 | 3 | 0 | 15 | −15 | 0 | |

Source: The Straits Times

South Korea
5
Queen Elizabeth Stadium
19 February 1992

New Zealand
0

| | | Result |
|---|---|---|---|
| 1 | Lee Gwang-jin | 2 – 0 (15–11, 15–6) | Nick Hall |
| 2 | Kim Hak-kyun | 2 – 0 (15–4, 15–8) | Grant Walker |
| 3 | Park Sung-woo | 2 – 0 (15–1, 15–4) | Brent Chapman |
| 4 | Kim Moon-soo; Park Joo-bong | 2 – 0 (15–3, 15–8) | Dean Galt; Kerrin Harrison |
| 5 | Lee Sang-bok; Shon Jin-hwan | 2 – 0 (15–0, 15–5) | Nick Hall; Grant Walker |

Thailand
4
Queen Elizabeth Stadium
19 February 1992

India
1

| | | Result |
|---|---|---|---|
| 1 | Sompol Kukasemkij | 2 – 0 (15–6, 18–14) | Rajeev Bagga |
| 2 | Teeranun Chiangta | 0 – 2 (11–15, 13–18) | Dipankar Bhattacharjee |
| 3 | Surachai Makkasasithorn | 2 – 1 (1–15, 15–6, 15–12) | Praveen Kumar |
| 4 | Siripong Siripool; Pramote Teerawiwatana | 2 – 0 (15–1, 15–4) | U. Vinod Kumar; George Thomas |
| 5 | Sompol Kukasemkij; Sakrapee Thongsari | 2 – 0 (15–7, 18–17) | Rajeev Bagga; Uday Pawar |

Thailand
5
Queen Elizabeth Stadium
20 February 1992

New Zealand
0

| | | Result |
|---|---|---|---|
| 1 | Sompol Kukasemkij | 2 – 0 (15–4, 15–7) | Kerrin Harrison |
| 2 | Teeranun Chiangta | 2 – 1 (15–10, 11–15, 15–5) | Dean Galt |
| 3 | Surachai Makkasasithorn | 2 – 0 (15–10, 15–7) | Nick Hall |
| 4 | Siripong Siripool; Pramote Teerawiwatana | 2 – 1 (8–15, 15–10, 15–7) | Dean Galt; Kerrin Harrison |
| 5 | Sompol Kukasemkij; Sakrapee Thongsari | 2 – 0 (18–14, 15–2) | Nick Hall; Grant Walker |

South Korea
5
Queen Elizabeth Stadium
20 February 1992

India
0

| | | Result |
|---|---|---|---|
| 1 | Lee Gwang-jin | 2 – 0 | Rajeev Bagga |
| 2 | Kim Hak-kyun | 2 – 0 | Dipankar Bhattarcharjee |
| 3 | Park Sung-woo | 2 – 0 | Praveen Kumar |
| 4 | Kim Moon-soo; Park Joo-bong | 2 – 0 | U. Vinod Kumar; Uday Pawar |
| 5 | Lee Sang-bok; Shon Jin-hwan | 2 – 0 | Rajeev Bagga; Praveen Kumar |

South Korea
5
Queen Elizabeth Stadium
21 February 1992

Thailand
0

| | | Result |
|---|---|---|---|
| 1 | Lee Gwang-jin | 1 – 2 | Sompol Kukasemkij |
| 2 | Kim Hak-kyun | 2 – 0 | Teeranun Chiangta |
| 3 | Park Sung-woo | 2 – 0 | Surachai Makkasasithorn |
| 4 | Kim Moon-soo; Park Joo-bong | 2 – 0 | Siripong Siripool; Pramote Teerawiwatana |
| 5 | Lee Gwang-jin; Kim Hak-kyun | 2 – 1 | Sompol Kukasemkij; Sakrapee Thongsari |

India
5
Queen Elizabeth Stadium
21 February 1992

New Zealand
0

| | | Result |
|---|---|---|---|
| 1 | Rajeev Bagga | 2 – 1 | Kerrin Harrison |
| 2 | Dipankar Bhattarcharjee | 2 – 1 | Dean Galt |
| 3 | Praveen Kumar | 2 – 0 | Brent Chapman |
| 4 | U. Vinod Kumar; George Thomas | 2 – 1 | Dean Galt; Kerrin Harrison |
| 5 | Rajeev Bagga; Praveen Kumar | 2 – 1 | Nick Hall; Grant Walker |

=== Knockout stage ===
Semi-finals
Indonesia | 5
Thailand | 0
Chinese Taipei | 0
South Korea | 5

Final
Indonesia | 5
South Korea | 0
Third place
Thailand | 4
Chinese Taipei | 1

==== Semi-finals ====
Indonesia
5
Queen Elizabeth Stadium
23 February 1992

Thailand
0

| | | Result |
|---|---|---|---|
| 1 | Ardy Wiranata | 2 – 0 | Sompol Kukasemkij |
| 2 | Alan Budikusuma | 2 – 0 | Teeranun Chiangta |
| 3 | Hermawan Susanto | 2 – 0 | Surachai Makkasasithorn |
| 4 | Rudy Gunawan; Eddy Hartono | 2 – 0 | Siripong Siripool; Pramote Teerawiwatana |
| 5 | Rexy Mainaky; Ricky Subagja | 2 – 0 | Sompol Kukasemkij; Sakrapee Thongsari |

South Korea
5
Queen Elizabeth Stadium
23 February 1992

Chinese Taipei
0

| | | Result |
|---|---|---|---|
| 1 | Lee Gwang-jin | 2 – 1 | Lee Mou-chou |
| 2 | Kim Hak-kyun | 2 – 1 | Liu En-hung |
| 3 | Park Sung-woo | 2 – 0 | Lin Wei-chen |
| 4 | Kim Moon-soo; Park Joo-bong | 2 – 0 | Horng Shin-jeng; Horng Wen-i |
| 5 | Lee Gwang-jin; Kim Hak-kyun | 2 – 1 | Liu En-hung; Yang Shih-jeng |

==== Third place ====
Thailand
4
Queen Elizabeth Stadium
24 February 1992

Chinese Taipei
1

| | | Result |
|---|---|---|---|
| 1 | Sompol Kukasemkij | 1 – 2 (9–15, 15–8, 11–15) | Lee Mou-chou |
| 2 | Teeranun Chiangta | 2 – 0 (15–11, 15–3) | Liu En-hung |
| 3 | Surachai Makkasasithorn | 2 – 0 (15–12, 15–8) | Lin Wei-chen |
| 4 | Siripong Siripool; Pramote Teerawiwatana | 2 – 1 (15–7, 2–15, 15–5) | Horng Shin-jeng; Horng Wen-i |
| 5 | Sompol Kukasemkij; Sakrapee Thongsari | 2 – 0 (15–9, 15–3) | Liu En-hung; Yang Shih-jeng |

==== Final ====
Indonesia
5
Queen Elizabeth Stadium
24 February 1992

South Korea
0

| | | Result |
|---|---|---|---|
| 1 | Ardy Wiranata | 2 – 1 (18–17, 12–15, 15–9) | Park Sung-woo |
| 2 | Alan Budikusuma | 2 – 0 (15–3, 15–4) | Kim Yong-ho |
| 3 | Hermawan Susanto | 2 – 0 (15–2, 15–1) | Shon Jin-hwan |
| 4 | Rudy Gunawan; Eddy Hartono | 2 – 0 (18–16, 15–3) | Lee Sang-bok; Shon Jin-hwan |
| 5 | Rexy Mainaky; Ricky Subagja | 2 – 0 (15–4, 17–14) | Richard Mainaky; Icuk Sugiarto |

== European Zone ==
The European qualifying rounds were held in Maaspoort in 's-Hertogenbosch, Netherlands. South Africa made their return to the qualifying rounds since 1970 when the team was barred from international competitions following South Africa's policy on apartheid.

=== First round ===
==== Group A ====
| Pos | Team | Pld | W | L | MF | MA | MD | Pts | Qualification |
|---|---|---|---|---|---|---|---|---|---|
| 1 | Switzerland | 3 | 3 | 0 | 14 | 1 | +13 | 3 | Advance to second round |
| 2 | South Africa | 3 | 2 | 1 | 10 | 5 | +5 | 2 | |
| 3 | Spain | 3 | 1 | 2 | 3 | 12 | −9 | 1 | |
| 4 | Peru | 3 | 0 | 3 | 3 | 12 | −9 | 0 | |

Source: The Straits Times

Switzerland
5
Maaspoort
16 February 1992

Spain
0

| | | Result |
|---|---|---|---|
| 1 | Thomas Wapp | 2 – 1 (15–10, 9–15, 15–3) | David Serrano |
| 2 | Christian Nyffenegger | 2 – 0 (15–1, 15–4) | Bernardo Galmes |
| 3 | Remy Müller | 2 – 0 (15–11, 15–4) | Antonio Miranda |
| 4 | Remy Müller; Thomas Wapp | 2 – 0 (15–10, 15–3) | José Bermúdez; David Serrano |
| 5 | Lawrence Chew; Laurent Jaquenoud | 2 – 0 (15–6, 15–8) | Bernardo Galmes; Antonio Miranda |

Peru
1
Maaspoort
16 February 1992

South Africa
4

| | | Result |
|---|---|---|---|
| 1 | Gustavo Salazar | 1 – 2 | Anton Kriel |
| 2 | José Iturriaga | 1 – 2 | Alan Phillips |
| 3 | Mario Carulla | 2 – 0 | Nico Meerholz |
| 4 | Gustavo Salazar; Federico Valdez | 1 – 2 | Anton Kriel; Nico Meerholz |
| 5 | Mario Carulla; José Iturriaga | 1 – 2 | Peter Elsey; Alan Phillips |

Switzerland
5
Maaspoort
17 February 1992

Peru
0

| | | Result |
|---|---|---|---|
| 1 | Thomas Wapp | 2 – 0 | Gustavo Salazar |
| 2 | Christian Nyffenegger | 2 – 0 | José Iturriaga |
| 3 | Remy Müller | 2 – 1 | Mario Carulla |
| 4 | Remy Müller; Thomas Wapp | 2 – 1 | Gustavo Salazar; Federico Valdez |
| 5 | Lawrence Chew; Laurent Jaquenoud | 2 – 1 | Mario Carulla; José Iturriaga |

Spain
0
Maaspoort
17 February 1992

South Africa
5

| | | Result |
|---|---|---|---|
| 1 | David Serrano | 1 – 2 | Anton Kriel |
| 2 | Bernardo Galmes | 0 – 2 | Alan Phillips |
| 3 | Antonio Miranda | 0 – 2 | Nico Meerholz |
| 4 | José Bermúdez; David Serrano | 0 – 2 | Anton Kriel; Nico Meerholz |
| 5 | Bernardo Galmes; Antonio Miranda | 1 – 2 | Peter Elsey; Alan Phillips |

Switzerland
4
Maaspoort
19 February 1992

South Africa
1

| | | Result |
|---|---|---|---|
| 1 | Thomas Wapp | 2 – 0 (15–11, 15–1) | Anton Kriel |
| 2 | Christian Nyffenegger | 2 – 0 (15–6, 15–2) | Alan Phillips |
| 3 | Remy Müller | 2 – 0 (15–10, 15–12) | Nico Meerholz |
| 4 | Remy Müller; Thomas Wapp | 0 – 2 (13–15, 3–15) | Anton Kriel; Nico Meerholz |
| 5 | Lawrence Chew; Laurent Jaquenoud | 2 – 1 (7–15, 17–15, 15–3) | Peter Elsey; Alan Phillips |

Spain
3
Maaspoort
19 February 1992

Peru
2

| | | Result |
|---|---|---|---|
| 1 | David Serrano | 2 – 1 | Gustavo Salazar |
| 2 | Bernardo Galmes | 1 – 2 | José Iturriaga |
| 3 | Antonio Miranda | 1 – 2 | Mario Carulla |
| 4 | José Bermúdez; David Serrano | 2 – 1 | Gustavo Salazar; Federico Valdez |
| 5 | Bernardo Galmes; Antonio Miranda | 2 – 1 | Mario Carulla; José Iturriaga |

==== Group B ====
| Pos | Team | Pld | W | L | MF | MA | MD | Pts | Qualification |
|---|---|---|---|---|---|---|---|---|---|
| 1 | Iran | 3 | 3 | 0 | 13 | 2 | +11 | 3 | Advance to second round |
| 2 | Ireland | 3 | 2 | 1 | 12 | 3 | +9 | 2 | |
| 3 | Malta | 3 | 1 | 2 | 4 | 11 | −7 | 1 | |
| 4 | Cyprus | 3 | 0 | 3 | 1 | 14 | −13 | 0 | |

Source: The Straits Times

Ireland
5
Maaspoort
17 February 1992

Malta
0

| | | Result |
|---|---|---|---|
| 1 | Michael Watt | 2 – 0 | Kenneth Vella |
| 2 | Jim Colfor | 2 – 0 | Simon Spiteri |
| 3 | Bruce Topping | 2 – 0 | Aldo Polidano |
| 4 | Michael O'Meara; Mark Peard | 2 – 0 | Aldo Polidano; Kenneth Vella |
| 5 | Bruce Topping; Michael Watt | 2 – 0 | David Cole; Simon Spiteri |

Iran
5
Maaspoort
17 February 1992

Cyprus
0

| | | Result |
|---|---|---|---|
| 1 | Morteza Validarvi | 2 – 0 | Nicolas Pissis |
| 2 | Bahador Zakizadeh | 2 – 0 | Antonis Lazaros Lazarou |
| 3 | Mansour Shakouri | 2 – 0 | Tasos Zevlaris |
| 4 | Ali Reza Shafiee; Bahador Zakizadeh | 2 – 0 | Nicolas Pissis; Antonis Lazaros Lazarou |
| 5 | Mansour Shakouri; Morteza Validarvi | 2 – 0 | Athos Shiakallis; Tasos Zevlaris |

Ireland
5
Maaspoort
18 February 1992

Cyprus
0

| | | Result |
|---|---|---|---|
| 1 | Michael Watt | 2 – 0 | Nicolas Pissis |
| 2 | Jim Colfor | 2 – 0 | Antonis Lazaros Lazarou |
| 3 | Bruce Topping | 2 – 0 | Tasos Zevlaris |
| 4 | Michael O'Meara; Mark Peard | 2 – 0 | Antonis Lazaros Lazarou; Nicolas Pissis |
| 5 | Bruce Topping; Michael Watt | 2 – 0 | Athos Shiakallis; Tasos Zevlaris |

Iran
5
Maaspoort
18 February 1992

Malta
0

| | | Result |
|---|---|---|---|
| 1 | Morteza Validarvi | 2 – 1 | Kenneth Vella |
| 2 | Bahador Zakizadeh | 2 – 0 | Simon Spiteri |
| 3 | Mansour Shakouri | 2 – 0 | David Cole |
| 4 | Ali Reza Shafiee; Bahador Zakizadeh | 2 – 0 | Aldo Polidano; Kenneth Vella |
| 5 | Mansour Shakouri; Morteza Validarvi | 2 – 0 | David Cole; Simon Spiteri |

Ireland
2
Maaspoort
19 February 1992

Iran
3

| | | Result |
|---|---|---|---|
| 1 | Michael Watt | 1 – 2 | Morteza Validarvi |
| 2 | Jim Colfor | 1 – 2 | Bahador Zakizadeh |
| 3 | Bruce Topping | 1 – 2 | Mansour Shakouri |
| 4 | Michael O'Meara; Mark Peard | 2 – 0 | Ali Reza Shafiee; Bahador Zakizadeh |
| 5 | Bruce Topping; Michael Watt | 2 – 0 | Mansour Shakouri; Morteza Validarvi |

Malta
4
Maaspoort
19 February 1992

Cyprus
1

| | | Result |
|---|---|---|---|
| 1 | Kenneth Vella | 2 – 0 | Nicolas Pissis |
| 2 | Simon Spiteri | 1 – 2 | Antonis Lazaros Lazarou |
| 3 | David Cole | 2 – 1 | Tasos Zevlaris |
| 4 | Aldo Polidano; Kenneth Vella | 2 – 1 | Nicolas Pissis; Antonis Lazaros Lazarou |
| 5 | David Cole; Simon Spiteri | 2 – 1 | Athos Shiakallis; Tasos Zevlaris |

==== Group C ====
| Pos | Team | Pld | W | L | MF | MA | MD | Pts | Qualification |
|---|---|---|---|---|---|---|---|---|---|
| 1 | United States | 3 | 3 | 0 | 15 | 0 | +15 | 3 | Advance to second round |
| 2 | Wales | 3 | 2 | 1 | 10 | 5 | +5 | 2 | |
| 3 | Mauritius | 3 | 1 | 2 | 3 | 12 | −9 | 1 | |
| 4 | Italy | 3 | 0 | 3 | 2 | 13 | −11 | 0 | |

Source: The Straits Times

United States
5
Maaspoort
17 February 1992

Italy
0

| | | Result |
|---|---|---|---|
| 1 | Chris Jogis | 2 – 0 | Anton Klotzner |
| 2 | Thomas Reidy | 2 – 0 | Andreas Pichler |
| 3 | Benny Lee | 2 – 0 | Giorgio Bianchi |
| 4 | Benny Lee; Thomas Reidy | 2 – 0 | Anton Klotzner; Andreas Pichler |
| 5 | Chong Weng Kai; David Shaw | 2 – 0 | Christian Hinteregger; Enrico La Rosa |

Wales
5
Maaspoort
17 February 1992

Mauritius
0

| | | Result |
|---|---|---|---|
| 1 | Mark Richards | 2 – 1 | Eddy Clarisse |
| 2 | Andrew Spencer | 2 – 0 | Gilles Allet |
| 3 | Geraint Lewis | 2 – 0 | Stephan Beeharry |
| 4 | Mark Richards; Andrew Spencer | 2 – 0 | Gilles Allet; Eddy Clarisse |
| 5 | Dayle Blencowe; Geraint Lewis | 2 – 0 | Stephan Beeharry; Reaz Vawda |

United States
5
Maaspoort
18 February 1992

Mauritius
0

| | | Result |
|---|---|---|---|
| 1 | Chris Jogis | 2 – 0 | Eddy Clarisse |
| 2 | Thomas Reidy | 2 – 0 | Gilles Allet |
| 3 | Benny Lee | 2 – 0 | Stephan Beeharry |
| 4 | Benny Lee; Thomas Reidy | 2 – 0 | Gilles Allet; Eddy Clarisse |
| 5 | Chong Weng Kai; David Shaw | 2 – 0 | Stenio Poisson; Reaz Vawda |

Wales
5
Maaspoort
18 February 1992

Italy
0

| | | Result |
|---|---|---|---|
| 1 | Mark Richards | 2 – 0 | Anton Klotzner |
| 2 | Andrew Spencer | 2 – 0 | Andreas Pichler |
| 3 | Huw Bowen | 2 – 0 | Christian Hinteregger |
| 4 | Mark Richards; Andrew Spencer | 2 – 0 | Anton Klotzner; Andreas Pichler |
| 5 | Huw Bowen; Geraint Lewis | 2 – 0 | Giorgio Bianchi; Enrico La Rosa |

United States
5
Maaspoort
19 February 1992

Wales
0

| | | Result |
|---|---|---|---|
| 1 | Chris Jogis | 2 – 0 | Steven Yates |
| 2 | Chong Weng Kai | 2 – 0 | Mark Richards |
| 3 | Benny Lee | 2 – 0 | Andrew Spencer |
| 4 | Benny Lee; Thomas Reidy | 2 – 0 | Mark Richards; Andrew Spencer |
| 5 | Chong Weng Kai; David Shaw | 2 – 0 | Dayle Blencowe; Geraint Lewis |

Mauritius
3
Maaspoort
19 February 1992

Italy
2

| | | Result |
|---|---|---|---|
| 1 | Eddy Clarisse | 2 – 1 | Anton Klotzner |
| 2 | Gilles Allet | 1 – 2 | Andreas Pichler |
| 3 | Stephan Beeharry | 2 – 0 | Enrico La Rosa |
| 4 | Gilles Allet; Eddy Clarisse | 2 – 1 | Anton Klotzner; Andreas Pichler |
| 5 | Stenio Poisson; Reaz Vawda | 1 – 2 | Giorgio Bianchi; Christian Hinteregger |

==== Group D ====
| Pos | Team | Pld | W | L | MF | MA | MD | Pts | Qualification |
|---|---|---|---|---|---|---|---|---|---|
| 1 | Austria | 3 | 3 | 0 | 15 | 0 | +15 | 3 | Advance to second round |
| 2 | Jamaica | 3 | 2 | 1 | 8 | 7 | +1 | 2 | |
| 3 | Bulgaria | 3 | 1 | 2 | 7 | 8 | −1 | 1 | |
| 4 | Luxembourg | 3 | 0 | 3 | 0 | 15 | −15 | 0 | |

Source: The Straits Times

Austria
5
Maaspoort
17 February 1992

Luxembourg
0

| | | Result |
|---|---|---|---|
| 1 | Hannes Fuchs | 2 – 0 | Henry Meyer |
| 2 | Heimo Götschl | 2 – 0 | Pierre Bollig |
| 3 | Harald Koch | 2 – 0 | Marc Engelmann |
| 4 | Heinz Fischer; Jürgen Koch | 2 – 0 | Willy Groff; Roger Moes |
| 5 | Heimo Götschl; Harald Koch | 2 – 0 | Pierre Bollig; Henry Meyer |

Jamaica
3
Maaspoort
17 February 1992

Bulgaria
2

| | | Result |
|---|---|---|---|
| 1 | Robert Richards | 2 – 1 | Stojan Ivantchev |
| 2 | Paul Leyow | 0 – 2 | Ivan Ivanov |
| 3 | Garth King | 0 – 2 | Yasen Borisov |
| 4 | Garth King; Robert Richards | 2 – 1 | Yasen Borisov; Ivan Ivanov |
| 5 | Paul Leyow; Roy Paul Jr. | 2 – 1 | Boris Lalov; Stojan Ivantchev |

Austria
5
Maaspoort
18 February 1992

Bulgaria
0

| | | Result |
|---|---|---|---|
| 1 | Hannes Fuchs | 2 – 1 | Ivan Ivanov |
| 2 | Heimo Götschl | 2 – 1 | Yasen Borisov |
| 3 | Harald Koch | 2 – 1 | Svetoslav Stoyanov |
| 4 | Heinz Fischer; Jürgen Koch | 2 – 0 | Yasen Borisov; Ivan Ivanov |
| 5 | Heimo Götschl; Harald Koch | 2 – 0 | Boris Lalov; Stojan Ivantchev |

Jamaica
5
Maaspoort
18 February 1992

Luxembourg
0

| | | Result |
|---|---|---|---|
| 1 | Robert Richards | 2 – 0 | Henry Meyer |
| 2 | Garth King | 2 – 0 | Pierre Bollig |
| 3 | Roy Paul Jr. | 2 – 0 | Willy Groff |
| 4 | Robert Richards; Garth King | 2 – 0 | Pierre Bollig; Henry Meyer |
| 5 | Paul Leyow; Roy Paul Jr. | 2 – 0 | Willy Groff; Roger Moes |

Austria
5
Maaspoort
19 February 1992

Jamaica
0

| | | Result |
|---|---|---|---|
| 1 | Hannes Fuchs | 2 – 1 | Robert Richards |
| 2 | Heimo Götschl | 2 – 1 | Paul Leyow |
| 3 | Harald Koch | 2 – 1 | Garth King |
| 4 | Heinz Fischer; Jürgen Koch | 2 – 0 | Robert Richards; Garth King |
| 5 | Heimo Götschl; Harald Koch | 2 – 0 | Paul Leyow; Roy Paul Jr. |

Bulgaria
5
Maaspoort
19 February 1992

Luxembourg
0

| | | Result |
|---|---|---|---|
| 1 | Stojan Ivantchev | 2 – 0 | Henry Meyer |
| 2 | Ivan Ivanov | 2 – 0 | Pierre Bollig |
| 3 | Boris Lalov | 2 – 0 | Roger Moes |
| 4 | Yasen Borisov; Ivan Ivanov | 2 – 0 | Pierre Bollig; Henry Meyer |
| 5 | Mihail Popov; Svetoslav Stoyanov | 2 – 0 | Willy Groff; Roger Moes |

==== Group E ====
| Pos | Team | Pld | W | L | MF | MA | MD | Pts | Qualification |
|---|---|---|---|---|---|---|---|---|---|
| 1 | Norway | 3 | 3 | 0 | 14 | 1 | +13 | 3 | Advance to second round |
| 2 | Czechoslovakia | 3 | 2 | 1 | 11 | 4 | +7 | 2 | |
| 3 | Israel | 3 | 1 | 2 | 3 | 12 | −9 | 1 | |
| 4 | Hungary | 3 | 0 | 3 | 2 | 13 | −11 | 0 | |

Source: The Straits Times

Norway
5
Maaspoort
17 February 1992

Hungary
0

| | | Result |
|---|---|---|---|
| 1 | Hans Sperre Jr. | 2 – 0 (15–9, 15–10) | Attila Nagy |
| 2 | Erik Lia | 2 – 0 (15–1, 15–3) | Richárd Bánhidi |
| 3 | Arild Langnes | 2 – 0 (15–6, 15–1) | Tamás Hódos |
| 4 | Tor Egil Kristensen; Trond Wåland | 2 – 0 (15–1, 15–6) | Richárd Bánhidi; Attila Nagy |
| 5 | Arild Langnes; Erik Lia | 2 – 0 (15–9, 15–7) | Tamás Hódos; Tamás Lábodi |

Czechoslovakia
5
Maaspoort
17 February 1992

Israel
0

| | | Result |
|---|---|---|---|
| 1 | Tomasz Mendrek | 2 – 0 | Amir Moses |
| 2 | Petr Báša | 2 – 0 | Gadi Moses |
| 3 | Radek Svoboda | 2 – 0 | Danny Schneidman |
| 4 | Boris Krais; Ondřej Lubas | 2 – 0 | Amir Moses; Gadi Moses |
| 5 | Petr Báša; Tomasz Mendrek | 2 – 0 | Paz Ben-Sira; Reuven Moses |

Norway
5
Maaspoort
18 February 1992

Israel
0

| | | Result |
|---|---|---|---|
| 1 | Erik Lia | 2 – 0 (15–3, 15–0) | Gadi Moses |
| 2 | Tor Egil Kristensen | 2 – 1 (7–15, 15–8, 15–9) | Paz Ben-Sira |
| 3 | Børge Larsen | 2 – 0 (15–4, 15–2) | Danny Schneidman |
| 4 | Tor Egil Kristensen; Trond Wåland | 2 – 0 (15–7, 15–3) | Amir Moses; Gadi Moses |
| 5 | Arild Langnes; Børge Larsen | 2 – 0 (15–7, 15–6) | Danny Schneidman; Reuven Moses |

Czechoslovakia
5
Maaspoort
18 February 1992

Hungary
0

| | | Result |
|---|---|---|---|
| 1 | Tomasz Mendrek | 2 – 0 | Attila Nagy |
| 2 | Petr Báša | 2 – 0 | Richárd Bánhidi |
| 3 | Radek Svoboda | 2 – 0 | Tamás Lábodi |
| 4 | Boris Krais; Ondřej Lubas | 2 – 0 | Richárd Bánhidi; Attila Nagy |
| 5 | Petr Báša; Tomasz Mendrek | 2 – 0 | Tamás Hódos; Tamás Lábodi |

Norway
4
Maaspoort
19 February 1992

Czechoslovakia
1

| | | Result |
|---|---|---|---|
| 1 | Erik Lia | 0 – 2 (3–15, 9–15) | Tomasz Mendrek |
| 2 | Tor Egil Kristensen | 2 – 1 (15–10, 11–15, 15–7) | Petr Báša |
| 3 | Trond Wåland | 2 – 1 (9–15, 15–7, 15–5) | Radek Svoboda |
| 4 | Erik Lia; Hans Sperre Jr. | 2 – 0 (15–8, 15–3) | Boris Krais; Ondřej Lubas |
| 5 | Tor Egil Kristensen; Trond Wåland | 2 – 0 (17–15, 15–5) | Petr Báša; Tomasz Mendrek |

Hungary
2
Maaspoort
19 February 1992

Israel
3

| | | Result |
|---|---|---|---|
| 1 | Richárd Bánhidi | 1 – 2 | Amir Moses |
| 2 | Tamás Hódos | 2 – 1 | Gadi Moses |
| 3 | Tamás Lábodi | 1 – 2 | Paz Ben-Sira |
| 4 | Richárd Bánhidi; Attila Nagy | 1 – 2 | Amir Moses; Gadi Moses |
| 5 | Tamás Hódos; Tamás Lábodi | 2 – 1 | Danny Schneidman; Reuven Moses |

==== Group F ====
| Pos | Team | Pld | W | L | MF | MA | MD | Pts | Qualification |
|---|---|---|---|---|---|---|---|---|---|
| 1 | Iceland | 4 | 3 | 1 | 15 | 5 | +10 | 3 | Advance to second round |
| 2 | France | 4 | 3 | 1 | 13 | 7 | +6 | 3 | |
| 3 | Belgium | 4 | 3 | 1 | 12 | 8 | +4 | 3 | |
| 4 | Portugal | 4 | 1 | 3 | 6 | 14 | −8 | 1 | |
| 5 | Mexico | 4 | 0 | 4 | 4 | 16 | −12 | 0 | |

Source: The Straits Times

Belgium
4
Maaspoort
16 February 1992

Mexico
1

| | | Result |
|---|---|---|---|
| 1 | Pedro Vanneste | 2 – 0 | Fernando de la Torre |
| 2 | Alain de Leeuw | 2 – 0 | Luis Lópezllera |
| 3 | Jim van Bouwel | 2 – 1 | Ernesto de la Torre |
| 4 | Pedro Vanneste; Filip Vigneron | 1 – 2 | Fernando de la Torre; Luis Lópezllera |
| 5 | Alain de Leeuw; Jim van Bouwel | 2 – 0 | Bernardo Monreal; Enrique Parrales |

France
4
Maaspoort
16 February 1992

Portugal
1

| | | Result |
|---|---|---|---|
| 1 | Stéphane Renault | 2 – 0 | Ricardo Fernandes |
| 2 | Jean-Frédéric Massias | 2 – 0 | Fernando Silva |
| 3 | Christophe Jeanjean | 1 – 2 | Marco Vasconcelos |
| 4 | Franck Panel; Stéphane Renault | 2 – 1 | Ricardo Fernandes; Fernando Silva |
| 5 | Christophe Jeanjean; Jean-Frédéric Massias | 2 – 1 | Antonio Lopes; Marco Vasconcelos |

Belgium
5
Maaspoort
17 February 1992

Portugal
0

| | | Result |
|---|---|---|---|
| 1 | Pedro Vanneste | 2 – 0 | Ricardo Fernandes |
| 2 | Alain de Leeuw | 2 – 0 | Fernando Silva |
| 3 | Jim van Bouwel | 2 – 0 | Antonio Lopes |
| 4 | Pedro Vanneste; Filip Vigneron | 2 – 1 | Ricardo Fernandes; Fernando Silva |
| 5 | Alain de Leeuw; Yves de Negri | 2 – 1 | Antonio Lopes; Marco Vasconcelos |

Iceland
2
Maaspoort
17 February 1992

France
3

| | | Result |
|---|---|---|---|
| 1 | Broddi Kristjánsson | 2 – 0 (15–6, 18–14) | Franck Panel |
| 2 | Þorsteinn Páll Hængsson | 0 – 2 (8–15, 3–15) | Stéphane Renault |
| 3 | Jón Pétur Zimsen | 0 – 2 (1–15, 11–15) | Jean-Frédéric Massias |
| 4 | Árni Þór Hallgrímsson; Broddi Kristjánsson | 2 – 0 (15–8, 15–13) | Franck Panel; Stéphane Renault |
| 5 | Þorsteinn Páll Hængsson; Jón Pétur Zimsen | 1 – 2 (8–15, 15–10, 8–15) | Christophe Jeanjean; Jean-Frédéric Massias |

Iceland
5
Maaspoort
18 February 1992

Belgium
0

| | | Result |
|---|---|---|---|
| 1 | Broddi Kristjánsson | 2 – 0 | Pedro Vanneste |
| 2 | Árni Þór Hallgrímsson | 2 – 0 | Filip Vigneron |
| 3 | Jón Pétur Zimsen | 2 – 0 | Yves de Negri |
| 4 | Árni Þór Hallgrímsson; Broddi Kristjánsson | 2 – 1 | Pedro Vanneste; Filip Vigneron |
| 5 | Þorsteinn Páll Hængsson; Jón Pétur Zimsen | 2 – 1 | Alain de Leeuw; Jim van Bouwel |

Mexico
2
Maaspoort
18 February 1992

Portugal
3

| | | Result |
|---|---|---|---|
| 1 | Fernando de la Torre | 2 – 1 | Ricardo Fernandes |
| 2 | Luis Lópezllera | 1 – 2 | Fernando Silva |
| 3 | Bernardo Monreal | 1 – 2 | Hugo Rodrigues |
| 4 | Fernando de la Torre; Luis Lópezllera | 2 – 1 | Ricardo Fernandes; Fernando Silva |
| 5 | Bernardo Monreal; Enrique Parrales | 1 – 2 | Antonio Lopes; Marco Vasconcelos |

Iceland
3
Maaspoort
19 February 1992

Portugal
2

| | | Result |
|---|---|---|---|
| 1 | Broddi Kristjánsson | 2 – 0 (15–7, 15–7) | Ricardo Fernandes |
| 2 | Þorsteinn Páll Hængsson | 0 – 2 (11–15, 7–15) | Fernando Silva |
| 3 | Jón Pétur Zimsen | 0 – 2 (9–15, 6–15) | Marco Vasconcelos |
| 4 | Árni Þór Hallgrímsson; Broddi Kristjánsson | 2 – 0 (15–2, 15–4) | Ricardo Fernandes; Fernando Silva |
| 5 | Jón Pétur Zimsen; Óli Björn Zimsen | 2 – 0 (15–4, 15–3) | Antonio Lopes; Marco Vasconcelos |

Mexico
1
Maaspoort
19 February 1992

France
4

| | | Result |
|---|---|---|---|
| 1 | Fernando de la Torre | 2 – 1 | Franck Panel |
| 2 | Luis Lópezllera | 0 – 2 | Stéphane Renault |
| 3 | Eugenio Tapia | 0 – 2 | Jean-Frédéric Massias |
| 4 | Fernando de la Torre; Luis Lópezllera | 1 – 2 | Franck Panel; Stéphane Renault |
| 5 | Ernesto de la Torre; Enrique Parrales | 1 – 2 | Christophe Jeanjean; Jean-Frédéric Massias |

Iceland
5
Maaspoort
19 February 1992

Mexico
0

| | | Result |
|---|---|---|---|
| 1 | Árni Þór Hallgrímsson | 2 – 1 | Ernesto de la Torre |
| 2 | Jón Pétur Zimsen | 2 – 0 | Eugenio Tapia |
| 3 | Óli Björn Zimsen | 2 – 0 | Enrique Parrales |
| 4 | Árni Þór Hallgrímsson; Broddi Kristjánsson | 2 – 1 | Fernando de la Torre; Luis Lópezllera |
| 5 | Þorsteinn Páll Hængsson; Jón Pétur Zimsen | 2 – 1 | Bernardo Monreal; Eugenio Tapia |

Belgium
3
Maaspoort
19 February 1992

France
2

| | | Result |
|---|---|---|---|
| 1 | Pedro Vanneste | 2 – 0 | Franck Panel |
| 2 | Alain de Leeuw | 2 – 0 | Stéphane Renault |
| 3 | Jim van Bouwel | 1 – 2 | Jean-Frédéric Massias |
| 4 | Pedro Vanneste; Filip Vigneron | 2 – 1 | Franck Panel; Stéphane Renault |
| 5 | Alain de Leeuw; Yves de Negri | 1 – 2 | Christophe Jeanjean; Jean-Frédéric Massias |

=== Second round ===
==== Group W ====
| Pos | Team | Pld | W | L | MF | MA | MD | Pts | Qualification |
|---|---|---|---|---|---|---|---|---|---|
| 1 | Sweden | 3 | 3 | 0 | 15 | 0 | +15 | 3 | Advance to knockout stage |
| 2 | CIS | 3 | 2 | 1 | 10 | 5 | +5 | 2 | |
| 3 | Iceland | 3 | 1 | 2 | 3 | 12 | −9 | 1 | |
| 4 | Iran | 3 | 0 | 3 | 2 | 13 | −11 | 0 | |

Source: The Straits Times

Sweden
5
Maaspoort
20 February 1992

Iran
0

| | | Result |
|---|---|---|---|
| 1 | Jens Olsson | 2 – 0 (15–2, 15–8) | Morteza Validarvi |
| 2 | Peter Axelsson | 2 – 0 (15–12, 15–0) | Bahador Zakizadeh |
| 3 | Rickard Magnusson | 2 – 0 (15–1, 15–4) | Mansour Shakouri |
| 4 | Jan-Eric Antonsson; Stellan Österberg | 2 – 0 (15–4, 15–9) | Ali Reza Shafiee; Bahador Zakizadeh |
| 5 | Pär-Gunnar Jönsson; Mikael Rosén | 2 – 0 (15–5, 15–1) | Mansour Shakouri; Morteza Validarvi |

CIS
5
Maaspoort
20 February 1992

Iceland
0

| | | Result |
|---|---|---|---|
| 1 | Andrey Antropov | 2 – 0 (15–1, 15–5) | Broddi Kristjánsson |
| 2 | Mikhail Korshuk | 2 – 0 (15–2, 15–2) | Jón Pétur Zimsen |
| 3 | Igor Dmitriev | 2 – 0 (15–3, 15–2) | Óli Björn Zimsen |
| 4 | Andrey Antropov; Nikolai Zuyev | 2 – 0 (18–14, 15–3) | Árni Þór Hallgrímsson; Broddi Kristjánsson |
| 5 | Igor Dmitriev; Mikhail Korshuk | 2 – 0 (15–1, 18–14) | Þorsteinn Páll Hængsson; Jón Pétur Zimsen |

Sweden
5
Maaspoort
21 February 1992

Iceland
0

| | | Result |
|---|---|---|---|
| 1 | Jens Olsson | 2 – 0 (15–3, 15–5) | Broddi Kristjánsson |
| 2 | Peter Axelsson | 2 – 0 (15–11, 15–5) | Árni Þór Hallgrímsson |
| 3 | Patrik Andreasson | 2 – 0 (15–3, 15–3) | Óli Björn Zimsen |
| 4 | Jan-Eric Antonsson; Stellan Österberg | 2 – 0 (15–12, 15–9) | Árni Þór Hallgrímsson; Broddi Kristjánsson |
| 5 | Pär-Gunnar Jönsson; Mikael Rosén | 2 – 0 (15–8, 15–6) | Þorsteinn Páll Hængsson; Jón Pétur Zimsen |

CIS
5
Maaspoort
21 February 1992

Iran
0

| | | Result |
|---|---|---|---|
| 1 | Andrey Antropov | 2 – 0 (15–5, 15–10) | Morteza Validarvi |
| 2 | Mikhail Korshuk | 2 – 0 (15–10, 15–3) | Bahador Zakizadeh |
| 3 | Igor Dmitriev | 2 – 0 (15–2, 15–7) | Mansour Shakouri |
| 4 | Andrey Antropov; Nikolai Zuyev | 2 – 0 (15–4, 15–7) | Ali Reza Shafiee; Bahador Zakizadeh |
| 5 | Igor Dmitriev; Mikhail Korshuk | 2 – 0 (15–9, 15–2) | Mansour Shakouri; Morteza Validarvi |

Sweden
5
Maaspoort
22 February 1992

CIS
0

| | | Result |
|---|---|---|---|
| 1 | Jens Olsson | 2 – 1 (8–15, 18–14, 17–14) | Andrey Antropov |
| 2 | Peter Axelsson | 2 – 1 (12–15, 18–16, 15–12) | Mikhail Korshuk |
| 3 | Patrik Andreasson | 2 – 0 (15–3, 15–3) | Igor Dmitriev |
| 4 | Jan-Eric Antonsson; Stellan Österberg | 2 – 0 (15–6, 15–4) | Andrey Antropov; Nikolai Zuyev |
| 5 | Pär-Gunnar Jönsson; Mikael Rosén | 2 – 0 (15–1, 15–9) | Igor Dmitriev; Mikhail Korshuk |

Iceland
3
Maaspoort
22 February 1992

Iran
2

| | | Result |
|---|---|---|---|
| 1 | Broddi Kristjánsson | 2 – 0 (15–11, 15–8) | Morteza Validarvi |
| 2 | Jón Pétur Zimsen | 0 – 2 (12–15, 9–15) | Bahador Zakizadeh |
| 3 | Óli Björn Zimsen | 0 – 2 (11–15, 8–15) | Mansour Shakouri |
| 4 | Árni Þór Hallgrímsson; Broddi Kristjánsson | 2 – 0 (15–4, 15–11) | Ali Reza Shafiee; Bahador Zakizadeh |
| 5 | Þorsteinn Páll Hængsson; Óli Björn Zimsen | 2 – 0 (15–7, 15–2) | Mansour Shakouri; Morteza Validarvi |

==== Group X ====
| Pos | Team | Pld | W | L | MF | MA | MD | Pts | Qualification |
|---|---|---|---|---|---|---|---|---|---|
| 1 | England | 3 | 3 | 0 | 14 | 1 | +13 | 3 | Advance to knockout stage |
| 2 | Scotland | 3 | 2 | 1 | 7 | 8 | −1 | 2 | |
| 3 | Finland | 3 | 1 | 2 | 7 | 8 | −1 | 1 | |
| 4 | Norway | 3 | 0 | 3 | 2 | 13 | −11 | 0 | |

Source: The Straits Times

England
5
Maaspoort
20 February 1992

Norway
0

| | | Result |
|---|---|---|---|
| 1 | Darren Hall | 2 – 1 (10–15, 15–4, 15–7) | Erik Lia |
| 2 | Anders Nielsen | 2 – 0 (15–6, 15–5) | Arild Langnes |
| 3 | Peter Knowles | 2 – 0 (15–5, 15–6) | Børge Larsen |
| 4 | Andy Goode; Chris Hunt | 2 – 1 (8–15, 15–9, 15–10) | Hans Sperre Jr. Trond Wåland |
| 5 | Simon Archer; Nick Ponting | 2 – 0 (15–0, 15–1) | Arild Langnes; Børge Larsen |

Scotland
3
Maaspoort
20 February 1992

Finland
2

| | | Result |
|---|---|---|---|
| 1 | Kevin Scott | 0 – 2 (12–15, 5–15) | Robert Liljequist |
| 2 | Jim Mailer | 0 – 2 (12–15, 10–15) | Pontus Jäntti |
| 3 | Kenny Middlemiss | 2 – 0 (6–15, 15–13, 15–12) | Tony Tuominen |
| 4 | Alastair Gatt; Gordon Haldane | 2 – 0 (15–6, 15–13) | Robert Liljequist; Lasse Lindelöf |
| 5 | Russell Hogg; Kenny Middlemiss | 2 – 0 (15–12, 15–6) | Jyri Aalto; Tony Tuominen |

England
5
Maaspoort
21 February 1992

Finland
0

| | | Result |
|---|---|---|---|
| 1 | Darren Hall | 2 – 1 | Robert Liljequist |
| 2 | Anders Nielsen | 1 – 2 | Pontus Jäntti |
| 3 | Peter Smith | 2 – 0 | Tony Tuominen |
| 4 | Andy Goode; Chris Hunt | 2 – 0 | Robert Liljequist; Tony Tuominen |
| 5 | Simon Archer; Nick Ponting | 2 – 0 | Jyri Aalto; Lasse Lindelöf |

Scotland
4
Maaspoort
21 February 1992

Norway
1

| | | Result |
|---|---|---|---|
| 1 | Kevin Scott | 2 – 1 (9–15, 15–2, 15–12) | Hans Sperre Jr. |
| 2 | Jim Mailer | 0 – 2 (13–18, 7–15) | Erik Lia |
| 3 | Kenny Middlemiss | 2 – 0 (15–5, 15–5) | Arild Langnes |
| 4 | Russell Hogg; Kenny Middlemiss | 2 – 0 (15–8, 15–11) | Erik Lia; Hans Sperre Jr. |
| 5 | Alastair Gatt; Gordon Haldane | 2 – 1 (10–15, 15–9, 15–13) | Børge Larsen; Trond Wåland |

England
5
Maaspoort
22 February 1992

Scotland
0

| | | Result |
|---|---|---|---|
| 1 | Darren Hall | 2 – 0 (15–3, 15–8) | Kevin Scott |
| 2 | Anders Nielsen | 2 – 0 (15–5, 15–8) | Jim Mailer |
| 3 | Peter Smith | 2 – 0 (15–3, 15–0) | Alastair Gatt |
| 4 | Dave Wright; Nick Ponting | 2 – 1 (10–15, 18–15, 17–15) | Russell Hogg; Kenny Middlemiss |
| 5 | Andy Goode; Chris Hunt | 2 – 0 (15–10, 15–7) | Alastair Gatt; Gordon Haldane |

Finland
4
Maaspoort
22 February 1992

Norway
1

| | | Result |
|---|---|---|---|
| 1 | Robert Liljequist | 2 – 1 (9–15, 15–8, 15–7) | Hans Sperre Jr. |
| 2 | Pontus Jäntti | 2 – 0 (15–6, 15–5) | Erik Lia |
| 3 | Lasse Lindelöf | 2 – 0 (15–7, 15–2) | Arild Langnes |
| 4 | Jyri Aalto; Lasse Lindelöf | 0 – 2 (1–15, 7–15) | Erik Lia; Hans Sperre Jr. |
| 5 | Robert Liljequist; Tony Tuominen | 2 – 1 (10–15, 15–10, 15–1) | Børge Larsen; Trond Wåland |

==== Group Y ====
| Pos | Team | Pld | W | L | MF | MA | MD | Pts | Qualification |
|---|---|---|---|---|---|---|---|---|---|
| 1 | Netherlands | 3 | 3 | 0 | 12 | 3 | +9 | 3 | Advance to knockout stage |
| 2 | Germany | 3 | 2 | 1 | 8 | 6 | +2 | 2 | |
| 3 | United States | 3 | 1 | 2 | 7 | 9 | −2 | 1 | |
| 4 | Poland | 3 | 0 | 3 | 3 | 12 | −9 | 0 | |

Source: The Straits Times

Netherlands
3
Maaspoort
20 February 1992

United States
2

| | | Result |
|---|---|---|---|
| 1 | Chris Bruil | 2 – 0 (15–9, 15–7) | Chris Jogis |
| 2 | Jeroen van Dijk | 2 – 0 (15–8, 15–12) | Chong Weng Kai |
| 3 | Pierre Pelupessy | 2 – 0 (15–2, 15–10) | Kevin Han |
| 4 | Edwin van Dalm; Quinten van Dalm | 0 – 2 (13–18, 5–15) | Benny Lee; Thomas Reidy |
| 5 | Ron Michels; Randy Trieling | 1 – 2 (9–15, 15–10, 12–15) | Chong Weng Kai; David Shaw |

Germany
4
Maaspoort
20 February 1992

Poland
1

| | | Result |
|---|---|---|---|
| 1 | Markus Keck | 2 – 1 | Jacek Hankiewicz |
| 2 | Michael Helber | 2 – 1 | Dariusz Zięba |
| 3 | Oliver Pongratz | 2 – 0 | Piotr Mazur |
| 4 | Stefan Frey; Stephan Kuhl | 1 – 2 | Jerzy Dołhan; Jacek Hankiewicz |
| 5 | Markus Keck; Robert Neumann | 2 – 0 | Piotr Mazur; Dariusz Zięba |

Netherlands
4
Maaspoort
21 February 1992

Poland
1

| | | Result |
|---|---|---|---|
| 1 | Chris Bruil | 2 – 0 (15–4, 15–3) | Jacek Hankiewicz |
| 2 | Jeroen van Dijk | 2 – 0 (18–16, 15–12) | Dariusz Zięba |
| 3 | Pierre Pelupessy | 2 – 0 (15–3, 15–5) | Piotr Mazur |
| 4 | Edwin van Dalm; Quinten van Dalm | 0 – 2 (11–15, 6–15) | Jerzy Dołhan; Jacek Hankiewicz |
| 5 | Ron Michels; Randy Trieling | 2 – 0 (15–4, 15–1) | Piotr Mazur; Dariusz Zięba |

Germany
4
Maaspoort
21 February 1992

United States
1

| | | Result |
|---|---|---|---|
| 1 | Markus Keck | 2 – 0 | Thomas Reidy |
| 2 | Michael Helber | 2 – 0 | Benny Lee |
| 3 | Oliver Pongratz | 0 – 2 | Kevin Han |
| 4 | Stefan Frey; Stephan Kuhl | 2 – 1 | Benny Lee; Thomas Reidy |
| 5 | Markus Keck; Michael Helber | 2 – 1 | Chong Weng Kai; David Shaw |

Netherlands
5
Maaspoort
22 February 1992

Germany
0

| | | Result |
|---|---|---|---|
| 1 | Chris Bruil | 2 – 0 (15–8, 15–2) | Markus Keck |
| 2 | Jeroen van Dijk | 2 – 0 (15–7, 15–7) | Michael Helber |
| 3 | Pierre Pelupessy | 2 – 0 (15–8, 15–4) | Oliver Pongratz |
| 4 | Ron Michels; Randy Trieling | 2 – 0 (15–8, 15–12) | Stefan Frey; Stephan Kuhl |
| 5 | Chris Bruil; Pierre Pelupessy | 2 – 0 (17–15, 15–7) | Piotr Mazur; Dariusz Zięba |

United States
4
Maaspoort
22 February 1992

Poland
1

| | | Result |
|---|---|---|---|
| 1 | Chris Jogis | 2 – 0 | Jacek Hankiewicz |
| 2 | Chong Weng Kai | 2 – 0 | Dariusz Zięba |
| 3 | Kevin Han | 2 – 0 | Piotr Mazur |
| 4 | Benny Lee; Thomas Reidy | 0 – 2 | Jerzy Dołhan; Jacek Hankiewicz |
| 5 | Chong Weng Kai; David Shaw | 2 – 0 | Piotr Mazur; Dariusz Zięba |

==== Group Z ====
| Pos | Team | Pld | W | L | MF | MA | MD | Pts | Qualification |
|---|---|---|---|---|---|---|---|---|---|
| 1 | Denmark | 3 | 3 | 0 | 15 | 0 | +15 | 3 | Advance to knockout stage |
| 2 | Canada | 3 | 2 | 1 | 9 | 6 | +3 | 2 | |
| 3 | Austria | 3 | 1 | 2 | 5 | 10 | −5 | 1 | |
| 4 | Switzerland | 3 | 0 | 3 | 1 | 14 | −13 | 0 | |

Source: The Straits Times

Denmark
5
Maaspoort
20 February 1992

Austria
0

| | | Result |
|---|---|---|---|
| 1 | Poul-Erik Høyer Larsen | 2 – 0 (15–3, 15–2) | Hannes Fuchs |
| 2 | Peter Espersen | 2 – 0 (15–2, 15–3) | Heimo Götschl |
| 3 | Henrik Svarrer | 2 – 0 (15–11, 15–1) | Harald Koch |
| 4 | Jon Holst-Christensen; Thomas Lund | 2 – 0 (15–9, 15–5) | Heinz Fischer; Jürgen Koch |
| 5 | Jan Paulsen; Henrik Svarrer | 2 – 0 (15–7, 15–10) | Heimo Götschl; Harald Koch |

Canada
5
Maaspoort
20 February 1992

Switzerland
0

| | | Result |
|---|---|---|---|
| 1 | Bryan Blanshard | 2 – 1 (15–18, 15–12, 15–9) | Thomas Wapp |
| 2 | Jaimie Dawson | 2 – 0 (15–1, 15–12) | Christian Nyffenegger |
| 3 | David Humble | 2 – 0 (15–5, 15–5) | Remy Müller |
| 4 | Mike Bitten; Bryan Blanshard | 2 – 0 (15–10, 15–1) | Remy Müller; Thomas Wapp |
| 5 | David Humble; Anil Kaul | 2 – 0 (15–4, 15–9) | Lawrence Chew; Jorge Rodríguez |

Denmark
5
Maaspoort
21 February 1992

Switzerland
0

| | | Result |
|---|---|---|---|
| 1 | Poul-Erik Høyer Larsen | 2 – 0 (15–3, 15–6) | Thomas Wapp |
| 2 | Thomas Stuer-Lauridsen | 2 – 0 (15–5, 15–8) | Christian Nyffenegger |
| 3 | Peter Espersen | 2 – 0 (15–3, 15–4) | Remy Müller |
| 4 | Jon Holst-Christensen; Thomas Lund | 2 – 0 (15–4, 15–7) | Lawrence Chew; Laurent Jaquenoud |
| 5 | Jan Paulsen; Henrik Svarrer | 2 – 0 (15–2, 15–1) | Christian Nyffenegger; Jorge Rodríguez |

Canada
4
Maaspoort
21 February 1992

Austria
1

| | | Result |
|---|---|---|---|
| 1 | Bryan Blanshard | 2 – 0 | Hannes Fuchs |
| 2 | Jaimie Dawson | 2 – 0 | Heimo Götschl |
| 3 | David Humble | 2 – 0 | Harald Koch |
| 4 | Mike Bitten; Bryan Blanshard | 2 – 0 | Heinz Fischer; Jürgen Koch |
| 5 | David Humble; Anil Kaul | 1 – 2 | Heimo Götschl; Harald Koch |

Denmark
5
Maaspoort
22 February 1992

Canada
0

| | | Result |
|---|---|---|---|
| 1 | Poul-Erik Høyer Larsen | 2 – 0 | Bryan Blanshard |
| 2 | Thomas Stuer-Lauridsen | 2 – 0 | Jaimie Dawson |
| 3 | Peter Espersen | 2 – 0 | David Humble |
| 4 | Jon Holst-Christensen; Thomas Lund | 2 – 0 | Mike Bitten; Bryan Blanshard |
| 5 | Jan Paulsen; Henrik Svarrer | 2 – 0 | David Humble; Anil Kaul |

Austria
4
Maaspoort
22 February 1992

Switzerland
1

| | | Result |
|---|---|---|---|
| 1 | Hannes Fuchs | 2 – 1 | Thomas Wapp |
| 2 | Heimo Götschl | 1 – 2 | Christian Nyffenegger |
| 3 | Harald Koch | 2 – 0 | Remy Müller |
| 4 | Heinz Fischer; Jürgen Koch | 2 – 1 | Lawrence Chew; Laurent Jaquenoud |
| 5 | Heimo Götschl; Harald Koch | 2 – 1 | Christian Nyffenegger; Jorge Rodríguez |

=== Knockout stage ===
Semi-finals
Denmark | 3
Netherlands | 2
England | 1
Sweden | 4

Final
Denmark | 5
Sweden | 0
Third place
Netherlands | 1
England | 4

==== Semi-finals ====
Denmark
3
Maaspoort
23 February 1992

Netherlands
2

| | | Result |
|---|---|---|---|
| 1 | Poul-Erik Høyer Larsen | 2 – 1 (5–15, 15–11, 15–5) | Chris Bruil |
| 2 | Thomas Stuer-Lauridsen | 2 – 1 (8–15, 18–14, 15–10) | Jeroen van Dijk |
| 3 | Peter Espersen | 0 – 2 (11–15, 15–17) | Pierre Pelupessy |
| 4 | Jon Holst-Christensen; Thomas Lund | 2 – 0 (15–2, 15–3) | Edwin van Dalm; Quinten van Dalm |
| 5 | Jan Paulsen; Henrik Svarrer | 2 – 0 (15–4, 15–4) | Ron Michels; Randy Trieling |

Sweden
4
Maaspoort
23 February 1992

England
1

| | | Result |
|---|---|---|---|
| 1 | Jens Olsson | 1 – 2 (15–12, 12–15, 14–18) | Darren Hall |
| 2 | Peter Axelsson | 2 – 1 (15–9, 9–15, 18–17) | Anders Nielsen |
| 3 | Patrik Andreasson | 2 – 0 (15–10, 15–9) | Peter Knowles |
| 4 | Peter Axelsson; Pär-Gunnar Jönsson | 2 – 0 (15–4, 15–2) | Nick Ponting; Dave Wright |
| 5 | Jan-Eric Antonsson; Stellan Österberg | 2 – 1 (15–8, 12–15, 15–5) | Andy Goode; Chris Hunt |

==== Third place ====
England
4
Maaspoort
24 February 1992

Netherlands
1

| | | Result |
|---|---|---|---|
| 1 | Darren Hall | 2 – 1 (15–9, 12–15, 15–6) | Chris Bruil |
| 2 | Anders Nielsen | 0 – 2 (16–18, 2–15) | Jeroen van Dijk |
| 3 | Peter Knowles | 2 – 0 (15–10, 15–12) | Pierre Pelupessy |
| 4 | Andy Goode; Chris Hunt | 2 – 0 (15–7, 15–8) | Ron Michels; Randy Trieling |
| 5 | Simon Archer; Nick Ponting | 2 – 1 (17–15, 14–18, 15–2) | Chris Bruil; Pierre Pelupessy |

==== Final ====
Denmark
5
Maaspoort
24 February 1992

Sweden
0

| | | Result |
|---|---|---|---|
| 1 | Poul-Erik Høyer Larsen | 2 – 1 (11–15, 15–12, 15–8) | Jens Olsson |
| 2 | Thomas Stuer-Lauridsen | 2 – 0 (15–7, 15–3) | Patrik Andreasson |
| 3 | Peter Espersen | 2 – 0 (15–11, 15–10) | Rickard Magnusson |
| 4 | Thomas Lund; Henrik Svarrer | 2 – 0 (15–11, 15–7) | Peter Axelsson; Pär-Gunnar Jönsson |
| 5 | Jon Holst-Christensen; Jan Paulsen | 2 – 0 (15–4, 15–12) | Jan-Eric Antonsson; Stellan Österberg |
