= 1993 IBF World Championships – Mixed doubles =

Mixed doubles at the 1993 IBF World Championships
- Venue: National Indoor Arena
- Location: Birmingham, England
- Dates: May 31, 1993 – June 6, 1993

Medalists
gold medal	(Denmark) Thomas Lund (Sweden) Catrine Bengtsson
silver medal	Jon Holst-Christensen; Grete Mogensen	Denmark
bronze medal	Nick Ponting; Gillian Clark	England
bronze medal	Aryono Miranat; Eliza Nathanael	Indonesia

The 8th IBF World Championships (World Badminton Championships) were held in Birmingham, England in 1993. Following the results of the mixed doubles.

== Main stage ==
=== Section 1 ===
First round
(Denmark) Thomas Lund (Sweden) Catrine Bengtsson
bye
(Hong Kong) Chung Hoi Yuk (Hong Kong) Chan Siu Kwong
bye
(England) Julian Robertson (England) Julie Bradbury	w.o.
(Mozambique) Luis Antonio Timm (Mozambique) Indira Marta Nal Bhika
(Japan) Akihiro Imai (Japan) Haruko Matsuda	15	15
(Wales) David Tonks (Wales) Rachael Phipps	7	3
(Indonesia) Denny Kantono (Indonesia) Rosiana Tendean
bye
(Republic of Ireland) Michael O'Meara (Republic of Ireland) Sonya McGinn	17	2	15
(New Zealand) Dean Galt (New Zealand) Rhona Robertson	16	15	12
(Netherlands) Pierre Pelupessy (Netherlands) Monique Hoogland	15	15
(Malta) Aldo Polidano (Malta) Jo'Anne Grech	1	3
(Pakistan) Mirza Ali Yar Beg (Pakistan) Zarina Jamal	17	15
(Slovenia) Miha Vilar (Slovenia) Maja Nagode	14	12

Second round
(Denmark) Thomas Lund (Sweden) Catrine Bengtsson	15	15
(Hong Kong) Chung Hoi Yuk (Hong Kong) Chan Siu Kwong	4	4
(England) Julian Robertson (England) Julie Bradbury	15	16	15
(Japan) Akihiro Imai (Japan) Haruko Matsuda	2	18	9
(Indonesia) Denny Kantono (Indonesia) Rosiana Tendean	15	15
(Republic of Ireland) Michael O'Meara (Republic of Ireland) Sonya McGinn	3	5
(Netherlands) Pierre Pelupessy (Netherlands) Monique Hoogland	15	15
(Pakistan) Mirza Ali Yar Beg (Pakistan) Zarina Jamal	5	5

Third round
(Denmark) Thomas Lund (Sweden) Catrine Bengtsson	15	15
(England) Julian Robertson (England) Julie Bradbury	4	4
(Indonesia) Denny Kantono (Indonesia) Rosiana Tendean	15	15
(Netherlands) Pierre Pelupessy (Netherlands) Monique Hoogland	11	7

Fourth round
(Denmark) Thomas Lund (Sweden) Catrine Bengtsson	15	15
(Indonesia) Denny Kantono (Indonesia) Rosiana Tendean	7	11

=== Section 2 ===
First round
(Sweden) Peter Axelsson (England) Gillian Gowers
bye
(Mexico) Enrique Parrales (Mexico) Norma Hernandez
bye
(Canada) Bryan Blanshard (Canada) Denyse Julien	15	15
(Russia) Sergei Melnikov (Russia) Irina Yakusheva	2	4
(England) Simon Archer (England) Joanne Davies	15	15
(Australia) Mark Nichols (Australia) Rhonda Cator	12	9
(Germany) Michael Keck (Germany) Karen Neumann	15	15
(Ukraine) Valerj Strelcov (Ukraine) Natalia Melnikova	5	6
(United States) Kevin Han (United States) Ann French	15	15
(Bulgaria) Plamen Dimitrov (Bulgaria) Dimitriika Dimitrova	3	0
(Scotland) Alastair Gatt (Scotland) Aileen Travers	w.o.
(Poland) Paweł Wasilewski (Poland) Elżbieta Grzybek
(South Korea) Shon Jin-hwan (South Korea) Gil Young-ah
bye

Second round
(Sweden) Peter Axelsson (England) Gillian Gowers	w.o.
(Mexico) Enrique Parrales (Mexico) Norma Hernandez
(Canada) Bryan Blanshard (Canada) Denyse Julien	17	15
(England) Simon Archer (England) Joanne Davies	15	13
(Germany) Michael Keck (Germany) Karen Neumann	15	18
(United States) Kevin Han (United States) Ann French	1	1	4
(Scotland) Alastair Gatt (Scotland) Aileen Travers	15	15
(South Korea) Shon Jin-hwan (South Korea) Gil Young-ah	3	12

Third round
(Sweden) Peter Axelsson (England) Gillian Gowers	15	15
(Canada) Bryan Blanshard (Canada) Denyse Julien	6	7
(Germany) Michael Keck (Germany) Karen Neumann	15	15
(Scotland) Alastair Gatt (Scotland) Aileen Travers	10	10

Fourth round
(Sweden) Peter Axelsson (England) Gillian Gowers	15	15
(Germany) Michael Keck (Germany) Karen Neumann	3	7

=== Section 3 ===
First round
(England) Nick Ponting (England) Gillian Clark
bye
(Iceland) Þorsteinn Páll Hængsson (Iceland) Birna Petersen
bye
(Canada) David Humble (Canada) Caroline Thorn	15	15
(United States) Paul McAdam (United States) Andrea Andersson	10	8
(Bulgaria) D. Popov (Bulgaria) Emilia Dimitrova	15	15
(Peru) José Antonio Iturriaga (Peru) Lorena Blanco	7	4
(Denmark) Jan Paulsen (Denmark) Lotte Olsen
bye
(Belarus) Oleg Morozevich (Belarus) Tatiana Gerassimovitch	15	5	15
(Scotland) Kenny Middlemiss (Scotland) Elinor Middlemiss	11	15	6
(New Zealand) Nick Hall (New Zealand) Sheree Jefferson	w.o.
(Mexico) Bernardo Monreal (Mexico) Laura Amaya
(Czech Republic) Zdeněk Musil (Czech Republic) Markéta Koudelková	15	10	15
(Russia) Pavel Uvarov (Russia) Julia Martynenko	11	15	9

Second round
(England) Nick Ponting (England) Gillian Clark	15	15
(Iceland) Þorsteinn Páll Hængsson (Iceland) Birna Petersen	1	10
(Canada) David Humble (Canada) Caroline Thorn	15	15
(Bulgaria) D. Popov (Bulgaria) Emilia Dimitrova	3	4
(Denmark) Jan Paulsen (Denmark) Lotte Olsen	15	15
(Belarus) Oleg Morozevich (Belarus) Tatiana Gerassimovitch	6	6
(New Zealand) Nick Hall (New Zealand) Sheree Jefferson	15	15
(Czech Republic) Zdeněk Musil (Czech Republic) Markéta Koudelková	8	6

Third round
(England) Nick Ponting (England) Gillian Clark	4	15	15
(Canada) David Humble (Canada) Caroline Thorn	15	9	7
(Denmark) Jan Paulsen (Denmark) Lotte Olsen	15	15
(New Zealand) Nick Hall (New Zealand) Sheree Jefferson	2	1

Fourth round
(England) Nick Ponting (England) Gillian Clark	15	11	15
(Denmark) Jan Paulsen (Denmark) Lotte Olsen	12	15	13

=== Section 4 ===
First round
(Indonesia) Richard Mainaky (Indonesia) Erma Sulistyaningsih	w.o.
(Japan) Kazuhiro Honda (Japan) Takako Ida
(Austria) Jürgen Koch (Austria) Irina Serova	w.o.
(Poland) Robert Mateusiak (Poland) Marzena Lipińska
(Sweden) Jan-Eric Antonsson (Sweden) Astrid Crabo
bye
(France) Christophe Jeanjean (France) Sandrine Lefèvre
bye
(China) Zhao Jianhua (China) Zhu Aihua
bye
(South Korea) Jang Hye-ock (South Korea) Yoo Yong-sung	15	15
(Scotland) Bruce Flockhart (Scotland) Anne Gibson	0	1
(Australia) Peter Blackburn (Australia) Lisa Campbell	15	15	15
(Netherlands) Quinten van Dalm (Netherlands) Eline Coene	18	12	6
(Norway) Trond Waaland (Norway) Camilla Wright	4	15	15
(Wales) Dayle Blencowe (Wales) Katie Howell	1	8

Second round
(Indonesia) Richard Mainaky (Indonesia) Erma Sulistyaningsih	15	15
(Austria) Jürgen Koch (Austria) Irina Serova	5	5
(Sweden) Jan-Eric Antonsson (Sweden) Astrid Crabo	17	15
(France) Christophe Jeanjean (France) Sandrine Lefèvre	11	2
(China) Zhao Jianhua (China) Zhu Aihua	15	16	15
(South Korea) Jang Hye-ock (South Korea) Yoo Yong-sung	12	17	10
(Australia) Peter Blackburn (Australia) Lisa Campbell	15	15
(Norway) Trond Waaland (Norway) Camilla Wright	4	7

Third round
(Indonesia) Richard Mainaky (Indonesia) Erma Sulistyaningsih	15	15
(Sweden) Jan-Eric Antonsson (Sweden) Astrid Crabo	7	8
(China) Zhao Jianhua (China) Zhu Aihua	15	15
(Australia) Peter Blackburn (Australia) Lisa Campbell	10	6

Fourth round
(Indonesia) Richard Mainaky (Indonesia) Erma Sulistyaningsih	15	17
(China) Zhao Jianhua (China) Zhu Aihua	12	16

=== Section 5 ===
First round
(Denmark) Jon Holst-Christensen (Denmark) Grete Mogensen
bye
(Belarus) Vitali Shmakov (Belarus) Vlada Chernyavskaya
bye
(Australia) Murray Hocking (Australia) Michelle O'Neill	15	15
(Bulgaria) Jasen Borisov (Bulgaria) Victoria Hristova	3	7
(France) Manuel Dubrulle (France) Virginie Delvingt	15	15
(United States) Ignatius Rusli (United States) Liz Aronsohn	9	7
(Netherlands) Ron Michels (Netherlands) Erica van den Heuvel	w.o.
(Wales) Chris Rees (Wales) Hilary Tarleton
(Scotland) Gordon Haldane (Scotland) Jillian Haldane	15	15
(Slovenia) Ales Babnik (Slovenia) Mateja Slatnar	5	4
(Russia) Nikolaj Zuev (Russia) Marina Yakusheva
bye
(Canada) Anil Kaul (Canada) Si-An Deng	w.o.
(Poland) Marek Krajewski (Poland) Sylwia Rutkiewicz

Second round
(Denmark) Jon Holst-Christensen (Denmark) Grete Mogensen	15	15
(Belarus) Vitali Shmakov (Belarus) Vlada Chernyavskaya	4	5
(Australia) Murray Hocking (Australia) Michelle O'Neill	17	7	15
(France) Manuel Dubrulle (France) Virginie Delvingt	14	15	12
(Netherlands) Ron Michels (Netherlands) Erica van den Heuvel	15	15
(Scotland) Gordon Haldane (Scotland) Jillian Haldane	7	8
(Russia) Nikolaj Zuev (Russia) Marina Yakusheva	15	15
(Canada) Anil Kaul (Canada) Si-An Deng	12	5

Third round
(Denmark) Jon Holst-Christensen (Denmark) Grete Mogensen	15	15
(Australia) Murray Hocking (Australia) Michelle O'Neill	7	5
(Netherlands) Ron Michels (Netherlands) Erica van den Heuvel	18	15
(Russia) Nikolaj Zuev (Russia) Marina Yakusheva	15	4

Fourth round
(Denmark) Jon Holst-Christensen (Denmark) Grete Mogensen	15	15
(Netherlands) Ron Michels (Netherlands) Erica van den Heuvel	8	12

=== Section 6 ===
First round
(China) Chen Xingdong (China) Sun Man
bye
(Czech Republic) Daniel Gaspar (Czech Republic) Jitka Lacinová
bye
(Hong Kong) Ng Pak Kum (Hong Kong) Chan Oi Ni	15	15
(Ukraine) Sergej Repka (Ukraine) Irina Koloskova	7	6
(Switzerland) Jorge Rodríguez (Switzerland) Francine Carrel	w.o.
(Kazakhstan) Igor Dmitriev (Kazakhstan) Irina Gritsenko
(South Korea) Kim Shin-young (South Korea) Ha Tae-kwon	w.o.
(Peru) Mario Carulla (Peru) Maria Theresa Montero
(Germany) Kai Mitteldorf (Germany) Katrin Schmidt	15	15
(Hungary) Richárd Bánhidi (Hungary) Andrea Harsági	5	0
(England) Chris Hunt (England) Joanne Goode
bye
(Finland) Jari Eriksson (Finland) Susanna Kauhanen	15	15
(Bulgaria) Pjuzant Kassabian (Bulgaria) Neli Boteva	5	5

Second round
(China) Chen Xingdong (China) Sun Man	15	15
(Czech Republic) Daniel Gaspar (Czech Republic) Jitka Lacinová	5	6
(Hong Kong) Ng Pak Kum (Hong Kong) Chan Oi Ni	15	15
(Switzerland) Jorge Rodríguez (Switzerland) Francine Carrel	11	4
(South Korea) Kim Shin-young (South Korea) Ha Tae-kwon	7	15	17
(Germany) Kai Mitteldorf (Germany) Katrin Schmidt	15	5	14
(England) Chris Hunt (England) Joanne Goode	15	15
(Finland) Jari Eriksson (Finland) Susanna Kauhanen	3	2

Third round
(China) Chen Xingdong (China) Sun Man	15	15
(Hong Kong) Ng Pak Kum (Hong Kong) Chan Oi Ni	10	5
(South Korea) Kim Shin-young (South Korea) Ha Tae-kwon	18	6	15
(England) Chris Hunt (England) Joanne Goode	13	15	12

Fourth round
(China) Chen Xingdong (China) Sun Man	15	15
(South Korea) Kim Shin-young (South Korea) Ha Tae-kwon	9	6

=== Section 7 ===
First round
(Indonesia) Aryono Miranat (Indonesia) Eliza Nathanael
bye
(Germany) Stephan Kuhl (Germany) Sandra Beißel
bye
(Japan) Koji Miya (Japan) Kyoko Sasage	w.o.
(Slovenia) Mišo Mattias (Slovenia) Darja Kranjc
(Malta) Kenneth Vella (Malta) Rachel Williams	w.o.
(Mexico) Luis Lopezllera (Mexico) Ana Laura de la Torre Saavedra
(Denmark) Christian Jakobsen (Denmark) Marlene Thomsen
bye
(Bulgaria) Svetoslav Stoyanov (Bulgaria) Diana Koleva	7	15	15
(Scotland) Russell Hogg (Scotland) Jennifer Williamson	15	11	11
(Canada) Jaimie Dawson (Canada) Robbyn Hermitage	w.o.
(Poland) Damian Pławecki (Poland) Edyta Buziecka
(United States) Chong Weng Kai (United States) Linda French	17	15
(Iceland) Árni Þór Hallgrímsson (Iceland) Guðrún Júlíusdóttir	15	4

Second round
(Indonesia) Aryono Miranat (Indonesia) Eliza Nathanael	15	15
(Germany) Stephan Kuhl (Germany) Sandra Beißel	3	1
(Japan) Koji Miya (Japan) Kyoko Sasage	15	15
(Malta) Kenneth Vella (Malta) Rachel Williams	5	1
(Denmark) Christian Jakobsen (Denmark) Marlene Thomsen	15	15
(Bulgaria) Svetoslav Stoyanov (Bulgaria) Diana Koleva	1	5
(Canada) Jaimie Dawson (Canada) Robbyn Hermitage	15	15
(United States) Chong Weng Kai (United States) Linda French	5	11

Third round
(Indonesia) Aryono Miranat (Indonesia) Eliza Nathanael	15	15
(Japan) Koji Miya (Japan) Kyoko Sasage	2	10
(Denmark) Christian Jakobsen (Denmark) Marlene Thomsen	15	15
(Canada) Jaimie Dawson (Canada) Robbyn Hermitage	2	6

Fourth round
(Indonesia) Aryono Miranat (Indonesia) Eliza Nathanael	15	15
(Denmark) Christian Jakobsen (Denmark) Marlene Thomsen	13	7

=== Section 8 ===
First round
(Sweden) Pär-Gunnar Jönsson (Sweden) Maria Bengtsson
bye
(Scotland) David Gilmour (Scotland) Gillian Martin
bye
(China) Liang Qing (China) Peng Yun	w.o.
(Norway) Erik Lia (Norway) Lillian Olavesen
(Austria) Kai Abraham (Austria) Sabine Aberer	w.o.
(Nepal) Prakash Doj Rana (Nepal) Rajani Joshi Shrestha
(Australia) He Tim (Australia) Amanda Hardy	15	15
(Pakistan) Mohammed Saqib Majeed (Pakistan) Shamim Akhtar	3	0
(South Korea) Kang Kyung-jin (South Korea) Chung So-young
bye
(England) Dave Wright (England) Sara Sankey	15	15
(Poland) Jerzy Dołhan (Poland) Bożena Haracz	8	2
(New Zealand) Liao Yue Jin (New Zealand) Kerrin Harrison	w.o.
(Belgium) Pedro Vanneste (Belgium) Annemie Buyse

Second round
(Sweden) Pär-Gunnar Jönsson (Sweden) Maria Bengtsson	15	15
(Scotland) David Gilmour (Scotland) Gillian Martin	10	2
(China) Liang Qing (China) Peng Yun	15	5	15
(Austria) Kai Abraham (Austria) Sabine Aberer	7	15	12
(Australia) He Tim (Australia) Amanda Hardy	15	15
(South Korea) Kang Kyung-jin (South Korea) Chung So-young	5	12
(England) Dave Wright (England) Sara Sankey	15	15
(New Zealand) Liao Yue Jin (New Zealand) Kerrin Harrison	4	7

Third round
(Sweden) Pär-Gunnar Jönsson (Sweden) Maria Bengtsson	15	15
(China) Liang Qing (China) Peng Yun	5	11
(Australia) He Tim (Australia) Amanda Hardy	15	15
(England) Dave Wright (England) Sara Sankey	7	12

Fourth round
(Sweden) Pär-Gunnar Jönsson (Sweden) Maria Bengtsson	15	15
(Australia) He Tim (Australia) Amanda Hardy	3	11

== Final stage ==
Quarterfinals
(Denmark) Thomas Lund (Sweden) Catrine Bengtsson	15	15
(Sweden) Peter Axelsson (England) Gillian Gowers	6	6
(England) Nick Ponting (England) Gillian Clark	18	12	15
(Indonesia) Richard Mainaky (Indonesia) Erma Sulistyaningsih	17	15	11
(Denmark) Jon Holst-Christensen (Denmark) Grete Mogensen	15	15
(China) Chen Xingdong (China) Sun Man	10	6
(Indonesia) Aryono Miranat (Indonesia) Eliza Nathanael	8	15	15
(Sweden) Pär-Gunnar Jönsson (Sweden) Maria Bengtsson	15	7	6

Semifinals
(Denmark) Thomas Lund (Sweden) Catrine Bengtsson	15	18
(England) Nick Ponting (England) Gillian Clark	8	15
(Denmark) Jon Holst-Christensen (Denmark) Grete Mogensen	15	15
(Indonesia) Aryono Miranat (Indonesia) Eliza Nathanael	5	4

Final
(Denmark) Thomas Lund (Sweden) Catrine Bengtsson	10	15	15
(Denmark) Jon Holst-Christensen (Denmark) Grete Mogensen	15	6	12
