= 1993 IBF World Championships – Men's doubles =

Men's doubles at the 1993 IBF World Championships
- Venue: National Indoor Arena
- Location: Birmingham, England
- Dates: May 31, 1993 – June 6, 1993

Medalists
gold medal	Ricky Subagja; Rudy Gunawan	Indonesia
silver medal	Cheah Soon Kit; Soo Beng Kiang	Malaysia
bronze medal	Peter Axelsson; Pär-Gunnar Jönsson	Sweden
bronze medal	Chen Kang; Chen Hongyong	China

The 1993 IBF World Championships (World Badminton Championships) were held in Birmingham, England in 1993. Following the results of the men's doubles.

== Qualification ==
- (Czech Republic) Daniel Gaspar / Zdeněk Musil - (Mexico) Bernardo Monreal / Enrique Parrales: 15-8, 15-4
- (Wales) Dayle Blencowe / Geraint Lewis - (Poland) Jerzy Dołhan / Grzegorz Olchowik: w.o.
- (Austria) Peter Kreulitsch / (Republic of Ireland) Mark Peard - (Malta) David Cole / Kenneth Vella: 15-6, 15-3
- (England) Michael Adams / Chris Hunt - (Ukraine) Vladislav Druzchenko / Valerij Strelcov: 18-15, 9-15, 15-9
- (France) Manuel Dubrulle / Etienne Thobois - (Nigeria) Danjuma Fatauchi / Adewole Sanyaolu: w.o.
- (Iran) Ali Reza Shafiee / Saed Bahador Zakizadeh - (Poland) Michał Mirowski / Damian Pławecki: w.o.
- (Australia) Peter Blackburn / Mark Nichols - (Germany) Michael Keck / Uwe Ossenbrink: 15-13, 9-15, 15-3
- (Scotland) Russell Hogg / Kenny Middlemiss - (Ukraine) Leonid Pugach / Sergej Repka: w.o.
- (China) Jiang Xin / Yu Qi - (Ukraine) Leonid Pugach / Sergej Repka: 4-15, 15-7, 15-7
- (Poland) Jacek Hankiewicz / Dariusz Zięba - (Slovenia) Aleš Babnik / Miha Kosnik: 15-2, 15-4
- (Iceland) Þorsteinn Páll Hængsson / (New Zealand) Nick Hall - (India) Pullela Gopichand / George Thomas: 10-15, 15-1, 15-6
- (Japan) Fumihiko Machida / Koji Miya - (Pakistan) Mirza Ali Yar Beg / Mohammed Saqib Majeed: w.o.
- (Germany) Michael Helber / Markus Keck - (France) Christophe Jeanjean / Jean-Frederic Massias: 15-5, 15-9
- (Hong Kong) Chan Siu Kwong / Ng Pak Kum - (Malta) Martin Farrugia / Aldo Polidano: 15-2, 15-5
- (Bulgaria) Boris Kessov / (Netherlands) Quinten van Dalm - (Lithuania) Egidijus Jankauskas / Aivaras Kvedarauskas: 15-6, 15-8
- (Iceland) Árni Þór Hallgrímsson / Broddi Kristjánsson - (Iran) Hameed Nasimi / Morteza Validarvi: 15-0, 15-11
- (Norway) Erik Lia / Trond Waaland - (Belgium) Yves de Negri / Filip Vigneron: 15-10, 18-15
- (Canada) David Humble / Anil Kaul - (Kenya) Satish Narasimhan / Pritesh Shah: 15-4, 15-3

== Main stage ==
=== Section 1 ===
First round
(Indonesia) Ricky Subagja (Indonesia) Rudy Gunawan	15	15
(Portugal) Ricardo Fernandes (Portugal) Fernando Silva	4	3
(India) Ajay Kanwar (India) Vijaydeep Singh	15	15
(Czech Republic) Daniel Gaspar (Czech Republic) Zdeněk Musil	4	7
(England) Simon Archer (England) Nick Ponting	15	15
(Belarus) Mikhail Korshuk (Belarus) Vitali Shmakov	9	5
(New Zealand) Dean Galt (New Zealand) Kerrin Harrison	15	15
(Wales) Dayle Blencowe (Wales) Geraint Lewis	4	2
(Malaysia) Jalani Sidek (Malaysia) Razif Sidek	15	15
(Peru) Mario Carulla (Peru) José Antonio Iturriaga	4	3
(Canada) Mike Bitten (Canada) Bryan Blanshard	15	15
(Austria) Peter Kreulitsch (Republic of Ireland) Mark Peard	6	5
(China) Huang Zhanzhong (China) Liu Di	15	15
(Japan) Akihiro Imai (Japan) Yasumasa Tsujita	5	6
(Germany) Stephan Kuhl (Germany) Kai Mitteldorf	15	15
(Scotland) David Gilmour (Scotland) Craig Robertson	11	11

Second round
(Indonesia) Ricky Subagja (Indonesia) Rudy Gunawan	15	15
(India) Ajay Kanwar (India) Vijaydeep Singh	4	2
(England) Simon Archer (England) Nick Ponting	15	15
(New Zealand) Dean Galt (New Zealand) Kerrin Harrison	1	4
(Malaysia) Jalani Sidek (Malaysia) Razif Sidek	15	15
(Canada) Mike Bitten (Canada) Bryan Blanshard	4	8
(China) Huang Zhanzhong (China) Liu Di	15	15
(Germany) Stephan Kuhl (Germany) Kai Mitteldorf	10	8

Third round
(Indonesia) Ricky Subagja (Indonesia) Rudy Gunawan	15	15
(England) Simon Archer (England) Nick Ponting	9	3
(Malaysia) Jalani Sidek (Malaysia) Razif Sidek	10	15	15
(China) Huang Zhanzhong (China) Liu Di	15	3	7

Quarterfinals
(Indonesia) Ricky Subagja (Indonesia) Rudy Gunawan	15	5	17
(Malaysia) Jalani Sidek (Malaysia) Razif Sidek	5	15	14

=== Section 2 ===
First round
(Sweden) Peter Axelsson (Sweden) Pär-Gunnar Jönsson	15	15
(Russia) Sergei Melnikov (Russia) Evgenij Nazarenko	8	4
(Scotland) Alastair Gatt (Scotland) Gordon Haldane	15	15
(Hungary) Richárd Bánhidi (Hungary) Tamas Labodi	3	8
(England) Michael Adams (England) Chris Hunt	11	15	15
(France) Manuel Dubrulle (France) Etienne Thobois	15	12	3
(Malaysia) Yap Yee Guan (Malaysia) Yap Yee Hup	10	15	15
(Netherlands) Chris Bruil (Netherlands) Ron Michels	15	4	7
(Denmark) Jon Holst-Christensen (Denmark) Thomas Lund	w.o.
(Mozambique) Serpa Pinto Horacio (Mozambique) Luis Antonio Timm
(Slovenia) Bojan Strah (Slovenia) Miha Vilar	15	10	15
(Iran) Ali Reza Shafiee (Iran) Saed Bahador Zakizadeh	11	15	5
(South Korea) Kang Kyung-jin (South Korea) Shon Jin-hwan	15	15
(United States) Paul Mcadam (United States) Ignatius Rusli	6	3
(Australia) Peter Blackburn (Australia) Mark Nichols	13	15	15
(Republic of Ireland) Michael O'Meara (Republic of Ireland) Bruce Topping	15	11	8

Second round
(Sweden) Peter Axelsson (Sweden) Pär-Gunnar Jönsson	15	15'
(Scotland) Alastair Gatt (Scotland) Gordon Haldane	4	3
(England) Michael Adams (England) Chris Hunt	15	15
(Malaysia) Yap Yee Guan (Malaysia) Yap Yee Hup	5	11
(Denmark) Jon Holst-Christensen (Denmark) Thomas Lund	w.o.
(Slovenia) Bojan Strah (Slovenia) Miha Vilar
(South Korea) Kang Kyung-jin (South Korea) Shon Jin-hwan	15	15
(Australia) Peter Blackburn (Australia) Mark Nichols	5	1

Third round
(Sweden) Peter Axelsson (Sweden) Pär-Gunnar Jönsson	15	15
(England) Michael Adams (England) Chris Hunt	2	11
(Denmark) Jon Holst-Christensen (Denmark) Thomas Lund	15	15
(South Korea) Kang Kyung-jin (South Korea) Shon Jin-hwan	5	6

Quarterfinals
(Sweden) Peter Axelsson (Sweden) Pär-Gunnar Jönsson	15	9	15
(Denmark) Jon Holst-Christensen (Denmark) Thomas Lund	9	15	4

=== Section 3 ===
First round
(Malaysia) Cheah Soon Kit (Malaysia) Soo Beng Kiang	15	15
(Denmark) Jens Eriksen (Denmark) Christian Jakobsen	2	4
(Germany) Michael Helber (Germany) Markus Keck	w.o.
(Nigeria) Tamuno Gibson (Nigeria) Agarawu Tunde
(Japan) Fumihiko Machida (Japan) Koji Miya	15	15
(Iceland) Þorsteinn Páll Hængsson (New Zealand) Nick Hall	11	2
(Sweden) Jan-Eric Antonsson (Sweden) Mikael Rosén	15	15
(Mexico) Ernesto de la Torre Saavedra (Mexico) Luis Lopezllera	11	4
(South Korea) Ha Tae-kwon (South Korea) Yoo Yong-sung	15	15
(Poland) Jacek Hankiewicz (Poland) Dariusz Zięba	7	8
(Austria) Kai Abraham (Austria) Jürgen Koch	w.o.
-
(Russia) Andreij Antropov (Russia) Nikolaj Zuev	15	15
(Bulgaria) Nedelcho Kessov (Bulgaria) Vasilios Velkos	4	3
(China) Jiang Xin (China) Yu Qi	15	15
(Scotland) Russell Hogg (Scotland) Kenny Middlemiss	6	4

Second round
(Malaysia) Cheah Soon Kit (Malaysia) Soo Beng Kiang	15	15
(Germany) Michael Helber (Germany) Markus Keck	8	4
(Japan) Fumihiko Machida (Japan) Koji Miya	12	15	15
(Sweden) Jan-Eric Antonsson (Sweden) Mikael Rosén	15	3	9
(South Korea) Ha Tae-kwon (South Korea) Yoo Yong-sung	15	7	15
(Austria) Kai Abraham (Austria) Jürgen Koch	10	15	12
(Russia) Andreij Antropov (Russia) Nikolaj Zuev	11	17	15
(China) Jiang Xin (China) Yu Qi	15	15	4

Third round
(Malaysia) Cheah Soon Kit (Malaysia) Soo Beng Kiang	15	15
(Japan) Fumihiko Machida (Japan) Koji Miya	7	5
(South Korea) Ha Tae-kwon (South Korea) Yoo Yong-sung	5	17	15
(Russia) Andreij Antropov (Russia) Nikolaj Zuev	15	14	9

Quarterfinals
(Malaysia) Cheah Soon Kit (Malaysia) Soo Beng Kiang	15	15
(South Korea) Ha Tae-kwon (South Korea) Yoo Yong-sung	8	8

=== Section 4 ===
First round
(China) Chen Kang (China) Chen Hongyong	15	15
(United States) Chong Weng Kai (United States) Kevin Han	3	8
(Hong Kong) Chan Siu Kwong (Hong Kong) Ng Pak Kum	15	15
(Cyprus) Nicolas Pissis (Cyprus) Evandros Votsis	1	1
(Denmark) Jan Paulsen (Denmark) Michael Sogaard	15	15
(Switzerland) Christian Nyffenegger (Switzerland) Jorge Rodríguez	4	5
(England) Julian Robertson (England) Dave Wright	15	15
(Bulgaria) Boris Kessov (Netherlands) Quinten van Dalm	5	4
(Indonesia) Antonius Budi Ariantho (Indonesia) Denny Kantono	15	15
(Republic of Ireland) Graham Henderson (Wales) Steven Yates	0	3
(Canada) David Humble (Canada) Anil Kaul	15	15
(Norway) Erik Lia (Norway) Trond Waaland	12	9
(Thailand) Pramote Teerawiwatana (Thailand) Sakrapee Thongsari	15	15
(Slovakia) Juraj Brestovský (Slovakia) Igor Novak	1	2
(Iceland) Árni Þór Hallgrímsson (Iceland) Broddi Kristjánsson	18	15
(Hong Kong) He Tim (Australia) Murray Hocking	14	8

Second round
(China) Chen Kang (China) Chen Hongyong	15	15
(Hong Kong) Chan Siu Kwong (Hong Kong) Ng Pak Kum	8	9
(Denmark) Jan Paulsen (Denmark) Michael Sogaard	9	15	15
(England) Julian Robertson (England) Dave Wright	15	10	13
(Indonesia) Antonius Budi Ariantho (Indonesia) Denny Kantono	15	15
(Canada) David Humble (Canada) Anil Kaul	4	3
(Thailand) Pramote Teerawiwatana (Thailand) Sakrapee Thongsari	15	15
(Iceland) Árni Þór Hallgrímsson (Iceland) Broddi Kristjánsson	12	10

Third round
(China) Chen Kang (China) Chen Hongyong	15	18
(Denmark) Jan Paulsen (Denmark) Michael Sogaard	12	15
(Indonesia) Antonius Budi Ariantho (Indonesia) Denny Kantono	10	15	15
(Thailand) Pramote Teerawiwatana (Thailand) Sakrapee Thongsari	15	9	4

Quarterfinals
(China) Chen Kang (China) Chen Hongyong	17	16	18
(Indonesia) Antonius Budi Ariantho (Indonesia) Denny Kantono	15	18	16

== Final stage ==
Quarterfinals
(Indonesia) Ricky Subagja (Indonesia) Rudy Gunawan	15	5	17
(Malaysia) Jalani Sidek (Malaysia) Razif Sidek	5	15	14
(Sweden) Peter Axelsson (Sweden) Pär-Gunnar Jönsson	15	9	15
(Denmark) Jon Holst-Christensen (Denmark) Thomas Lund	9	15	4
(Malaysia) Cheah Soon Kit (Malaysia) Soo Beng Kiang	15	15
(South Korea) Ha Tae-kwon (South Korea) Yoo Yong-sung	8	8
(China) Chen Kang (China) Chen Hongyong	17	16	18
(Indonesia) Antonius Budi Ariantho (Indonesia) Denny Kantono	15	18	16

Semifinals
(Indonesia) Ricky Subagja (Indonesia) Rudy Gunawan	15	11	15
(Sweden) Peter Axelsson (Sweden) Pär-Gunnar Jönsson	9	15	4
(Malaysia) Cheah Soon Kit (Malaysia) Soo Beng Kiang	15	15
(China) Chen Kang (China) Chen Hongyong	6	5

Final
(Indonesia) Ricky Subagja (Indonesia) Rudy Gunawan	15	15
(Malaysia) Cheah Soon Kit (Malaysia) Soo Beng Kiang	11	3
