= Badminton at the 1992 Summer Olympics – Men's doubles =

Badminton at the Olympics

Men's doubles at the Games of the XXV Olympiad
- Venue: Pavelló de la Mar Bella
- Date: 28 July – 4 August 1992
- Competitors: 30 pairs from 21 nations

Medalists
1st place, gold medalist(s)		Kim Moon-soo; Park Joo-bong	South Korea
2nd place, silver medalist(s)		Eddy Hartono; Rudy Gunawan	Indonesia
3rd place, bronze medalist(s)		Razif Sidek; Jalani Sidek	Malaysia
3rd place, bronze medalist(s)		Li Yongbo; Tian Bingyi	China

The badminton men's singles tournament at the 1992 Summer Olympics took place from 28 July to 4 August at Pavelló de la Mar Bella. The winner of this men's doubles was the 3 times former world champion, Kim Moon-soo and Park Joo-bong of Korea.

== Results ==
=== Top half ===
First round
(South Korea) Kim Moon-soo (South Korea) Park Joo-bong
bye
(Canada) Mike Bitten (Canada) Bryan Blanshard	6	12
(China) Chen Hongyong (China) Chen Kang	15	15
(Indonesia) Rexy Mainaky (Indonesia) Ricky Subagja	15	15
(Sweden) Peter Axelsson (Sweden) Pär-Gunnar Jönsson	5	11
(United Kingdom) Nick Ponting (United Kingdom) David Wright	15	15
(Germany) Stefan Frey (Germany) Stephan Kuhl	7	9
(Malaysia) Razif Sidek (Malaysia) Jalani Sidek	15	15
(India) Vimal Kumar (India) Deepankar Bhattacharya	6	3
(New Zealand) Dean Galt (New Zealand) Kerrin Harrison	0	2
(Denmark) Jon Holst-Christensen (Denmark) Thomas Lund	15	15
(Iceland) Arni Hallgrimsson (Iceland) Broddi Kristjansson	15	6	12
(Hong Kong) Chan Siu Kwong (Hong Kong) Ng Pak Kum	12	15	15
(Japan) Shuji Matsuno (Japan) Shinji Matsuura	15	15
Anton Kriel; Nico Meerholz	4	2

Second round
(South Korea) Kim Moon-soo (South Korea) Park Joo-bong	11	15	15
(China) Chen Hongyong (China) Chen Kang	15	5	9
(Indonesia) Rexy Mainaky (Indonesia) Ricky Subagja	15	15
(United Kingdom) Nick Ponting (United Kingdom) David Wright	3	9
(Malaysia) Razif Sidek (Malaysia) Jalani Sidek	15	15
(Denmark) Jon Holst-Christensen (Denmark) Thomas Lund	12	6
(Hong Kong) Chan Siu Kwong (Hong Kong) Ng Pak Kum	16	6
(Japan) Shuji Matsuno (Japan) Shinji Matsuura	18	15

Quarterfinals
(South Korea) Kim Moon-soo (South Korea) Park Joo-bong	15	15
(Indonesia) Rexy Mainaky (Indonesia) Ricky Subagja	7	4
(Malaysia) Razif Sidek (Malaysia) Jalani Sidek	15	15
(Japan) Shuji Matsuno (Japan) Shinji Matsuura	5	4

Semifinals
(South Korea) Kim Moon-soo (South Korea) Park Joo-bong	15	15
(Malaysia) Razif Sidek (Malaysia) Jalani Sidek	11	13

=== Bottom half ===
First round
(Singapore) Hamid Khan (Singapore) Koh Leng Kang	1	5
(Denmark) Jan Paulsen (Denmark) Henrik Svarrer	15	15
(Canada) David Humble (Canada) Anil Kaul	15	15
(Austria) Hannes Fuchs (Austria) Juergen Koch	11	11
(Sweden) Jan-Eric Antonsson (Sweden) Stellan Österberg	15	5
(Thailand) Siripong Siripool (Thailand) Pramote Teerawiwatana	18	15
(Malaysia) Soo Beng Kiang (Malaysia) Cheah Soon Kit	15	15	4
(China) Li Yongbo (China) Tian Bingyi	11	18	15
(United Kingdom) Andy Goode (United Kingdom) Chris Hunt	15	9	15
(Japan) Fumihiko Machida (Japan) Koji Miya	10	15	12
(South Korea) Lee Sang-bok (South Korea) Shon Jin-hwan	15	15
(Bulgaria) Yassen Borissov (Bulgaria) Ivan Ivanov	0	1
(United States) Benny Lee (United States) Thomas Reidy	15	15
(Portugal) Ricardo Fernandes (Portugal) Fernando Silva	1	10
bye
(Indonesia) Eddy Hartono (Indonesia) Rudy Gunawan

Second round
(Denmark) Jan Paulsen (Denmark) Henrik Svarrer	15	15
(Canada) David Humble (Canada) Anil Kaul	5	4
(Thailand) Siripong Siripul (Thailand) Pramote Teerawiwatana	15	8	8
(China) Li Yongbo (China) Tian Bingyi	9	15	15
(United Kingdom) Andy Goode (United Kingdom) Chris Hunt	2	15	4
(South Korea) Lee Sang-bok (South Korea) Shon Jin-hwan	15	7	15
(United States) Benny Lee (United States) Thomas Reidy	3	6
(Indonesia) Eddy Hartono (Indonesia) Rudy Gunawan	15	15

Quarterfinals
(Denmark) Jan Paulsen (Denmark) Henrik Svarrer	11	15	14
(China) Li Yongbo (China) Tian Bingyi	15	12	17
(South Korea) Lee Sang-bok (South Korea) Shon Jin-hwan	4	15
(Indonesia) Eddy Hartono (Indonesia) Rudy Gunawan	15	18

Semifinals
(China) Li Yongbo (China) Tian Bingyi	9	8
(Indonesia) Eddy Hartono (Indonesia) Rudy Gunawan	15	15

=== Finals ===
Semifinals
(South Korea) Kim Moon-soo (South Korea) Park Joo-bong	15	15
(Malaysia) Razif Sidek (Malaysia) Jalani Sidek	11	13
(China) Li Yongbo (China) Tian Bingyi	9	8
(Indonesia) Eddy Hartono (Indonesia) Rudy Gunawan	15	15

Final
(South Korea) Kim Moon-soo (South Korea) Park Joo-bong	15	15
(Indonesia) Eddy Hartono (Indonesia) Rudy Gunawan	11	7
