= Badminton at the 1992 Summer Olympics – Men's singles =

Badminton at the Olympics

Men's singles at the Games of the XXV Olympiad
- Venue: Pavelló de la Mar Bella
- Date: 28 July – 4 August 1992
- Competitors: 56 from 32 nations

Medalists
1st place, gold medalist(s)		Alan Budikusuma	Indonesia
2nd place, silver medalist(s)		Ardy Wiranata	Indonesia
3rd place, bronze medalist(s)		Thomas Stuer-Lauridsen	Denmark
3rd place, bronze medalist(s)		Hermawan Susanto	Indonesia

The badminton men's singles tournament at the 1992 Summer Olympics took place from 28 July to 4 August at Pavelló de la Mar Bella. The men's singles resulted in the only non-Asian medallist, Thomas Stuer-Lauridsen of Denmark. 56 players from 32 nations competed in men's singles.

== Draws ==
=== First rounds ===
==== Section 1 ====
First Round
1	Zhao Jianhua (CHN)
Bye
Darren Hall (GBR)	15	15
David Humble (CAN)	6	4
Hannes Fuchs (AUT)	15	15
Niroshan Wijekoon (SRI)	9	11
Dipankar Bhattacharjee (IND)	15	15
Ivan Ivanov (BUL)	4	1
5/8	Hermawan Susanto (INA)
Bye
Robert Liljequist (FIN)	15	15
Ricardo Fernandes (POR)	3	11
Teeranun Chiangta (THA)	15	15
Broddi Kristjansson (ISL)	2	12
Chris Jogis (USA)	15	15
Dean Galt (NZL)	1	3

Second Round
1	Zhao Jianhua (CHN)	15	15
Darren Hall (GBR)	6	9
Hannes Fuchs (AUT)	15	11	11
Dipankar Bhattacharjee (IND)	8	15	15
5/8	Hermawan Susanto (INA)	15	15
Robert Liljequist (FIN)	11	3
Teeranun Chiangta (THA)	11	15	15
Chris Jogis (USA)	15	3	3

Third Round
1	Zhao Jianhua (CHN)	15	15
Dipankar Bhattacharjee (IND)	4	12
5/8	Hermawan Susanto (INA)	15	15
Teeranun Chiangta (THA)	7	8

Quarter Finals
1	Zhao Jianhua (CHN)	2	17	14
5/8	Hermawan Susanto (INA)	15	14	17

==== Section 2 ====
First Round
3/4	Ardy Wiranata (INA)
Bye
Jens Olsson (SWE)	5	15	15
Lee Gwang-jin (KOR)	15	12	5
Tomáš Mendrek (TCH)	15	15
Stéphane Renault (FRA)	5	2
Foo Kok Keong (MAS)	15	15
Hans Sperre Jr. (NOR)	11	3
5/8	Poul-Erik Høyer Larsen (DEN)
Bye
Fumihiko Machida (JPN)	9	15	15
Jacek Hankiewicz (POL)	15	13	3
Abdul Hamid Khan (SIN)	15	15
Pedro Vanneste (BEL)	11	3
Chan Kin Ngai (HKG)	15	15
Nico Meerholz (RSA)	7	4

Second Round
3/4	Ardy Wiranata (INA)	15	15
Jens Olsson (SWE)	11	6
Tomáš Mendrek (TCH)	2	3
Foo Kok Keong (MAS)	15	15
5/8	Poul-Erik Høyer Larsen (DEN)	15	15
Fumihiko Machida (JPN)	2	4
Abdul Hamid Khan (SIN)	13	3
Chan Kin Ngai (HKG)	18	15

Third Round
3/4	Ardy Wiranata (INA)	15	15
Foo Kok Keong (MAS)	4	6
5/8	Poul-Erik Høyer Larsen (DEN)	15	15
Chan Kin Ngai (HKG)	10	5

Quarter Finals
3/4	Ardy Wiranata (INA)	15	15
5/8	Poul-Erik Høyer Larsen (DEN)	10	12

==== Section 3 ====
First Round
Andrey Antropov (EUN)	15	15
Kerrin Harrison (NZL)	3	10
Peter Axelsson (SWE)	15	15
Fernando Silva (POR)	7	9
Sompol Kukasemkij (THA)	16	15	17
Anders Nielsen (GBR)	18	12	16
5/8	Alan Budikusuma (INA)	15	15
Donald Koh (SIN)	2	2
Árni Þór Hallgrímson (ISL)	15	15
Anton Kriel (RSA)	8	7
Kim Hak-kyun (KOR)	w	/	o
Thomas Reidy (USA)
Anil Kaul (CAN)	15	15
Florin Balaban (ROM)	7	4
Bye
3/4	Wu Wenkai (CHN)

Second Round
Andrey Antropov (EUN)	15	15
Peter Axelsson (SWE)	10	5
Sompol Kukasemkij (THA)	11	2
5/8	Alan Budikusuma (INA)	15	15
Árni Þór Hallgrímson (ISL)	7	14
Kim Hak-kyun (KOR)	15	18
Anil Kaul (CAN)	7	2
3/4	Wu Wenkai (CHN)	15	15

Third Round
Andrey Antropov (EUN)	4	7
5/8	Alan Budikusuma (INA)	15	15
Kim Hak-kyun (KOR)	10	15	18
3/4	Wu Wenkai (CHN)	15	7	13

Quarter Finals
5/8	Alan Budikusuma (INA)	15	15
Kim Hak-kyun (KOR)	9	4

==== Section 4 ====
First Round
Bryan Blanshard (CAN)	15	15
Benny Lee (USA)	3	1
Thomas Stuer-Lauridsen (DEN)	15	15
U. Vimal Kumar (IND)	6	6
Pontus Jäntti (FIN)	15	15
Yasen Borisov (BUL)	6	1
Bye
5/8	Liu Jun (CHN)
Wong Wai Lap (HKG)	15	15
Eddy Clarisse (MRI)	1	2
Jürgen Koch (AUT)	17	12	15
Stephan Kuhl (GER)	14	15	2
Hideaki Motoyama (JPN)	15	15
David Serrano (ESP)	9	10
Bye
2	Rashid Sidek (MAS)

Second Round
Bryan Blanshard (CAN)	7	4
Thomas Stuer-Lauridsen (DEN)	15	15
Pontus Jäntti (FIN)	13	7
5/8	Liu Jun (CHN)	15	15
Wong Wai Lap (HKG)	17	15	15
Jürgen Koch (AUT)	18	6	3
Hideaki Motoyama (JPN)	3	2
2	Rashid Sidek (MAS)	15	15

Third Round
Thomas Stuer-Lauridsen (DEN)	10	17	15
5/8	Liu Jun (CHN)	15	16	9
Wong Wai Lap (HKG)	2	3
2	Rashid Sidek (MAS)	15	15

Quarter Finals
Thomas Stuer-Lauridsen (DEN)	15	15
2	Rashid Sidek (MAS)	2	8

=== Finals ===
Quarterfinals
1	Zhao Jianhua (CHN)	2	17	14
5/8	Hermawan Susanto (INA)	15	14	17
3/4	Ardy Wiranata (INA)	15	15
5/8	Poul-Erik Høyer Larsen (DEN)	10	12
5/8	Alan Budikusuma (INA)	15	15
Kim Hak-kyun (KOR)	9	4
Thomas Stuer-Lauridsen (DEN)	15	15
2	Rashid Sidek (MAS)	2	8

Semifinals
5/8	Hermawan Susanto (INA)	15	9	9
3/4	Ardy Wiranata (INA)	10	15	15
5/8	Alan Budikusuma (INA)	18	15
Thomas Stuer-Lauridsen (DEN)	14	8

Finals
3/4	Ardy Wiranata (INA)	12	13
5/8	Alan Budikusuma (INA)	15	18
