= Florin Balaban =

Romanian badminton player (born 1968)

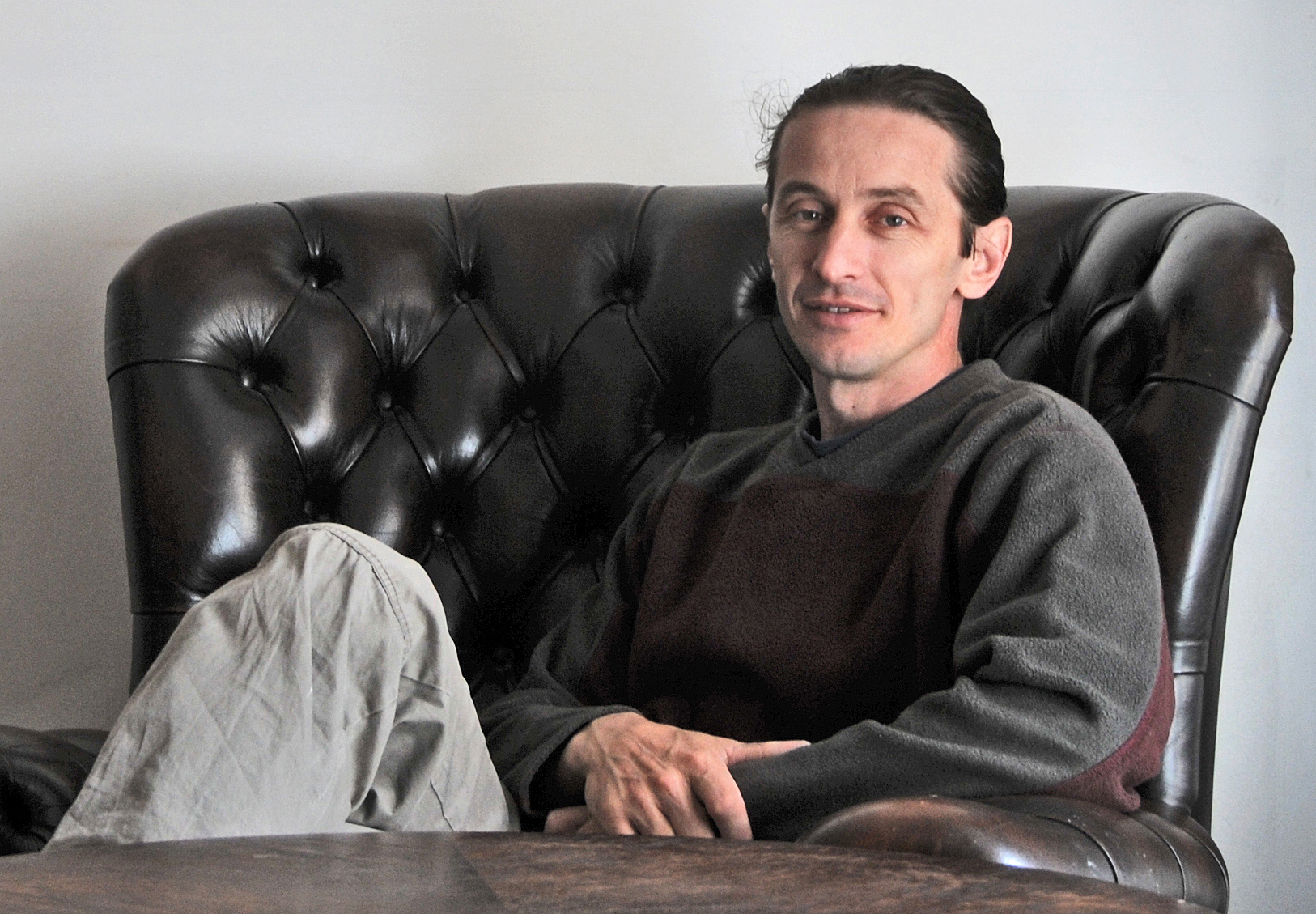
- Balaban in 2008
- Born: 16 August 1968 (age 58); Nicorești, Romania
- Citizenship: Romania; Luxembourg
- Education: Transylvania University of Braşov
- Occupations: Cartoonist, illustrator

Badminton career
- Country: Romania
- Years active: 1990–1995
- Handedness: Right
- Career record: 16 wins, 29 losses

Florin Balaban (born 16 August 1968) is a Romanian cartoonist, illustrator and former badminton player. He is the first Romanian badminton player to compete in the Olympic Games.

== Career ==
=== Badminton ===
Balaban first started his career in badminton in the 1990s. He won the national championship in men's singles two consecutive times in 1990 and 1991. He also competed in the Romanian International in 1991 where he lost in the final to Tamás Gebhard of Hungary.

In 1992, Balaban won the national men's doubles title with his partner Florentin Banu. In that same year, he competed in the men's singles tournament at the 1992 Summer Olympics. He lost in the first round to Anil Kaul of Canada.

=== Career in art ===
After Balaban retired from badminton, he started a new career in art as a cartoonist and a painter. He also moved to Luxembourg to pursue his career in art and has worked as an illustrator for Luxemburger Wort. In 2002, he was awarded the Premio Internationale Satira Politica in Forte dei Marmi, Italy.

He also founded the Caricature and Cartoon Museum in Vianden and organizes the Vianden International Caricature and Cartoon Show.

== Achievements ==
=== IBF International ===
Men's singles

| Year | Tournament | Opponent | Score | Result |
|---|---|---|---|---|
| 1991 | Romanian International | (Hungary) Tamás Gebhard | 5–15, 5–15 | (silver) Runner-up |

== Awards and accolades ==
=== Premio Internationale Satira Politica Forte dei Marmi ===
- 2002

=== World Press Cartoon ===
- 2008 – Honorable mention
- 2009 – 3rd place
