= Chan Kin Ngai =

Hong Kong badminton player (born 1968)

Chan Kin Ngai 陳健倪
Personal information
- Born: 18 November 1968 (age 57) Hong Kong
- Height: 1.70 m (5 ft 7 in)
- Weight: 58 kg (128 lb)

Sport
- Country: Hong Kong
- Sport: Badminton
- Event: Men's singles
Medal record
Men's badminton
Representing Hong Kong
Commonwealth Games
| Bronze medal – third place | 1990 Auckland | Mixed team |

Chan Kin Ngai (Chinese: 陳健倪; born 18 November 1968) is a Hong Kong former badminton player. He competed in the men's singles tournament at the 1992 Summer Olympics. Chan also won the Hong Kong Best Athlete Award in 1991.

== Career ==
In 1990, Chan was selected to represent the Hong Kong team in the 1990 Commonwealth Games. In 1991, Chan qualified for the men's singles event at the 1992 Summer Olympics when he was ranked 61st in men's singles on the world ranking.

In the 1992 Summer Olympics men's singles event, he defeated Nico Meerholz of South Africa and Abdul Hamid Khan of Singapore to reach the third round before losing to Poul-Erik Høyer Larsen of Denmark.

In 1993, Chan reached the finals of the Portugal International in both singles and doubles. In men's singles, he lost in the final to Andrey Antropov of Russia 8–15, 3–15. In men's doubles, he won his first title with Wong Wai Lap by defeating Andrey Antropov and Nikolai Zuyev of Russia.

== Achievements ==
=== IBF International ===
Men's singles

| Year | Tournament | Opponent | Score | Result |
|---|---|---|---|---|
| 1993 | Portugal International | (Russia) Andrey Antropov | 8–15, 3–15 | (silver) Runner-up |

Men's doubles

| Year | Tournament | Partner | Opponent | Score | Result |
|---|---|---|---|---|---|
| 1993 | Portugal International | (Hong Kong) Wong Wai Lap | (Russia) Andrey Antropov (Russia) Nikolai Zuyev | 10–15, 15–7, 15–11 | (gold) Winner |
