= Hideaki Motoyama =

Japanese badminton player

Personal information
- Nationality: Japanese
- Born: 25 July 1969
- Died: 29 July 2009 (aged 40)

Sport
- Sport: Badminton
- BWF profile

Hideaki Motoyama (本山 秀昭, Motoyama Hideaki)(25 July 1969 – 29 July 2009) was a Japanese badminton player. He competed in the men's singles tournament at the 1992 Summer Olympics.
