= Stéphane Renault =

French badminton player (born 1968)

Personal information
- Born: 1 March 1968 (age 58) Barfleur, France
- Height: 1.80 m (5 ft 11 in)

Sport
- Country: France
- Sport: Badminton
- Handedness: Left
- BWF profile
Medal record
Men's badminton
Representing France
Helvetia Cup
Gold medal – first place	1997 Strasbourg	Mixed team

Stéphane Renault (born 1 March 1968) is a French badminton player from Barfleur. He competed in the men's singles tournament at the 1992 Summer Olympics.

== Career ==
In 1988, Renault won his first international title at the Portugal International after defeating his compatriot, Franck Panel in the final. In 1990, he won two titles at the Israel International in men's singles and also in mixed doubles with his partner Elodie Mansuy.

In 1992, Renault competed in the men's singles tournament at the 1992 Summer Olympics. He lost in the first round to Tomasz Mendrek of Czechoslovakia.

== Achievements ==
=== IBF International ===
Men's singles

Year	Tournament	Opponent	Score	Result
1988	Portugal International	(France) Franck Panel		(gold) Winner
1990	Israel International			(gold) Winner

Mixed doubles

Year	Tournament	Partner	Opponent	Score	Result
1990	Israel International	(France) Elodie Mansuy			(gold) Winner
