= Jón Pétur Zimsen =

Icelandic politician

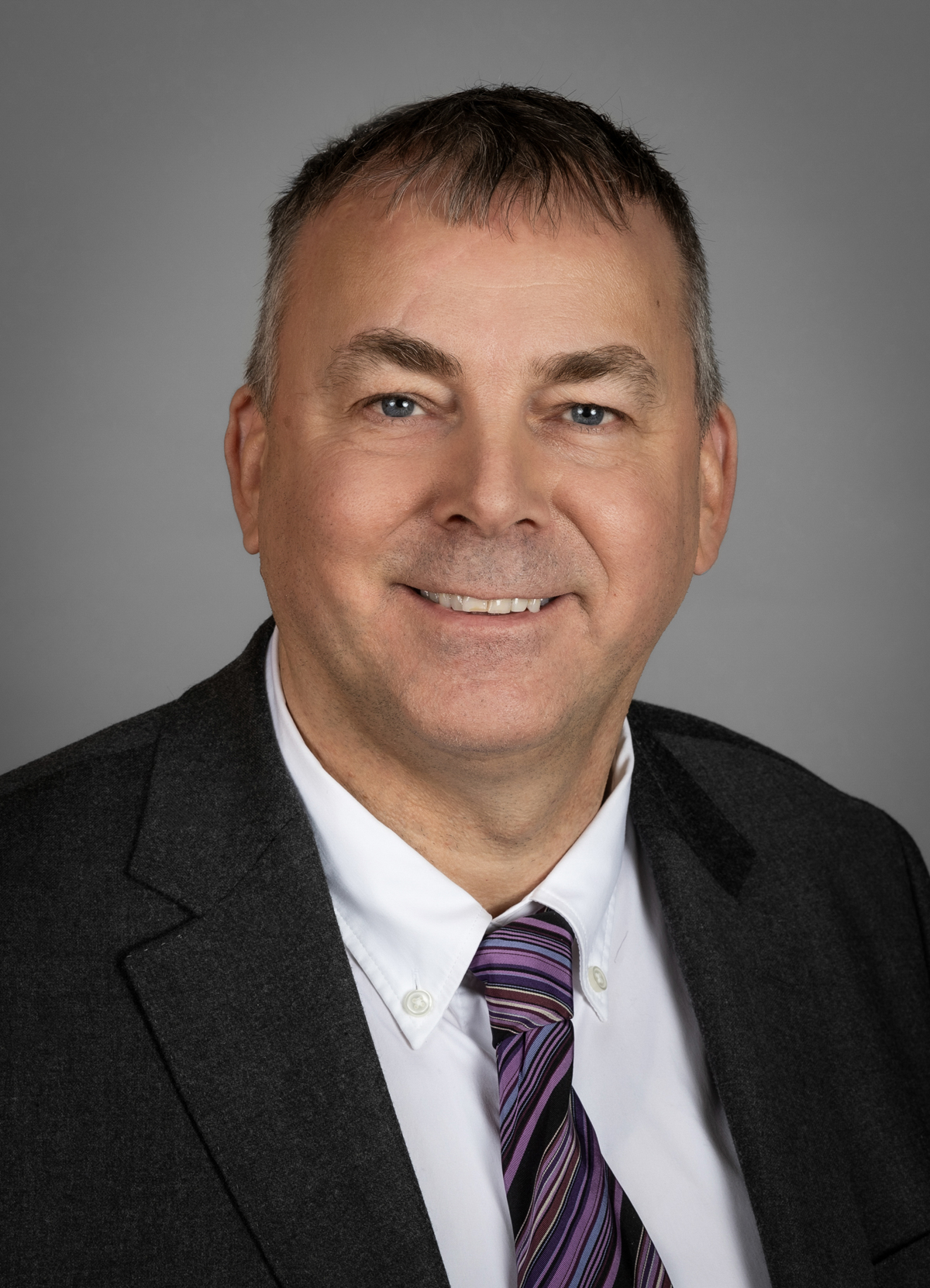

Member of the Althing
- Incumbent
- Assumed office 2024
- Constituency: Reykjavík South

Personal details
- Party: Independence
- Education: University of Iceland

Jón Pétur Zimsen is an Icelandic politician from the Independence Party. In the 2024 Icelandic parliamentary election he was elected to the Althing.

He is a graduate of the University of Iceland. He was assistant principal of Réttarholt School. In 2018 he was appointed as an assistant to Minister of Education and Culture Lilja Alfreðsdóttir.

== See also ==
- List of members of the Althing, 2024–2028
