= David Serrano (badminton) =

Spanish badminton player (born 1968)

Personal information
- Full name: David Serrano Vílchez
- Nationality: Spanish
- Born: 11 October 1968 (age 56); Granada, Spain
- Height: 180 cm (5 ft 11 in)

Sport
- Sport: Badminton

David Serrano Vílchez (Note: In this Spanish name, the first or paternal surname is Serrano and the second or maternal family name is Vílchez.) (born 11 October 1968) is a Spanish badminton player. He competed in the men's singles tournament at the 1992 Summer Olympics.
