= Nico Meerholz =

South African badminton player (born 1959)

Personal information
- Born: Nico George Meerholz; 23 October 1959 (age 67)
- Years active: 1988-2001
- Height: 1.86 m (6 ft 1 in)
- Weight: 78 kg (172 lb)

Sport
- Country: South Africa
- Sport: Badminton
- Handedness: Left

Men's singles & doubles
- Career record: 28 wins, 10 losses
- BWF profile
Medal record
Men's badminton
Representing South Africa
African Championships
Gold medal – first place	1992 Rose Hill	Men's doubles
Gold medal – first place	1994 Port Elizabeth	Men's doubles
Bronze medal – third place	1992 Rose Hill	Men's singles
Bronze medal – third place	1992 Rose Hill	Mixed doubles

Nico Meerholz (born 23 October 1959) is a South African badminton player. He competed in both men's singles and men's doubles at the 1992 Summer Olympics. He is one of the first South African players to win gold in men's doubles at the African Badminton Championships.

== Career ==
In 1992, Meerholz competed in the 1992 African Badminton Championships in all three disciplines. In men's singles, he defeated Mohamed Juma of Tanzania and entered the semi-finals. He won bronze after losing to Anton Kriel. In men's doubles, Meerholz partnered with Kriel and won gold in the event after defeating Gilles Allet and Eddy Clarisse of Mauritius in the final. In mixed doubles, Meerholz partnered with Tracey Thompson. The duo lost in the semi-finals against their compatriots.

Later that year, Meerholz competed in the Summer Olympics in Barcelona. He competed in the men's singles event but lost in the first round to Chan Kin Ngai of Hong Kong. Meerholz also competed with Anton Kriel in men's doubles. Their momentum was stopped in the first round after they lost to Shuji Matsuno and Shinji Matsuura of Japan.

In 1996, Meerholz and Kriel lost the South Africa International men's doubles final to Johan Kleingeld and Gavin Polmans. A year later, the duo won the title after defeating the same opponents they faced in the previous final.

== Achievements ==
=== African Championships ===
Men's singles
Year	Venue	Opponent	Score	Result
1992	Rose Hill, Mauritius	(South Africa) Anton Kriel	13–15, 8–15	Bronze

Men's doubles
Year	Venue	Partner	Opponent	Score	Result
1992	Rose Hill, Mauritius	(South Africa) Anton Kriel	(Mauritius) Gilles Allet (Mauritius) Eddy Clarisse	15–7, 15–1	Gold
1994	University of Port Elizabeth; Port Elizabeth, South Africa	(South Africa) Alan Phillips	(Mauritius) Stephan Beeharry (Mauritius) Eddy Clarisse		Gold

Mixed doubles
Year	Venue	Partner	Opponent	Score	Result
1992	Rose Hill, Mauritius	(South Africa) Tracey Thompson	(South Africa) Anton Kriel (South Africa) Lina Fourie	7–15, 7–15	Bronze

=== IBF International (2 titles, 3 runner-up) ===
Men's doubles
Year	Tournament	Partner	Opponent	Score	Result
1996	South Africa International	(South Africa) Anton Kriel	(South Africa) Johan Kleingeld (South Africa) Gavin Polmans	15–17, 11–15	(silver) Runner-up
1997	South Africa International	(South Africa) Anton Kriel	(South Africa) Johan Kleingeld (South Africa) Gavin Polmans	15–7, 15–10	(gold) Winner
2000	South Africa International	(South Africa) Anton Kriel	(South Africa) Johan Kleingeld (South Africa) Gavin Polmans	14–17, 15–12, 15–9	(gold) Winner

Mixed doubles
Year	Tournament	Partner	Opponent	Score	Result
1995	Botswana International	(South Africa) Tracey Thompson	(South Africa) Johan Kleingeld (South Africa) Lina Fourie	3–15, 3–15	(silver) Runner-up
1997	South Africa International	(South Africa) Tracey Thompson	(South Africa) Johan Kleingeld (South Africa) Lina Fourie	15–10, 9–15, 4–15	(silver) Runner-up
