= Wong Wai Lap =

Hong Kong badminton player (born 1969)

Wong Wai Lap 黃為立
Personal information
- Born: 16 July 1969 (age 56)
- Height: 1.79 m (5 ft 10 in)
- Weight: 67 kg (148 lb)

Sport
- Country: Hong Kong
- Sport: Badminton
- Event: Men's singles

Wong Wai Lap (born 16 July 1969) is a Hong Kong former badminton player. He competed in the men's singles tournament at the 1992 Summer Olympics.
