= Pedro Vanneste =

Belgian badminton player

Personal information
- Born: 7 December 1969 (age 56) Kortrijk, Belgium
- Years active: 1992–2003

Sport
- Country: Belgium (1992–1998); France (2003)
- Sport: Badminton
- Handedness: Right
- Retired: 2003
- Career title: 2
- BWF profile

Pedro Vanneste (born 7 December 1969) is a Belgian badminton player. He competed in the men's singles tournament at the 1992 Summer Olympics. He later represented France in 2003.

== Career ==
Vanneste competed in the men's singles tournament at the 1992 Summer Olympics. He was eliminated in the first round.

In 1995, Vanneste entered the finals of the 1995 Wimbledon International but lost to Peter Knowles in two straight games. He won his first title in men's singles at the 1996 Slovenian International after winning the final against Denis Peshehonov of Ukraine. He retained his Slovenian International title in 1997 by defeating Boris Kessov in the final. In 1998, he lost the Slovenian International final to home favorite Andrej Pohar.

He started to represent France in 2003 and competed in his last tournament at the 2003 Toulouse Open.

== Achievements ==
=== BWF International Challenge/Series ===
Men's singles
Year	Tournament	Opponent	Score	Result
1995	Wimbledon International I	(England) Peter Knowles	12–15, 5–15	(silver) Runner-up
1996	Czech International	(Sweden) Daniel Eriksson	11–15, 7–15	(silver) Runner-up
1996	Slovenian International	(Ukraine) Denis Peshehonov	15–6, 15–10	(gold) Winner
1997	Slovenian International	(Bulgaria) Boris Kessov	15–10, 4–0 retired	(gold) Winner
1998	Slovenian International	(Slovenia) Andrej Pohar	15–12, 12–15, 9–15	(silver) Runner-up

BWF International Challenge tournament
BWF International Series tournament
