= Ng Pak Kum =

Hong Kong badminton player (born 1968)

Ng Pak Kum 伍伯儉
Personal information
- Born: 8 October 1968 (age 57)
- Height: 1.76 m (5 ft 9 in)
- Weight: 63 kg (139 lb)

Sport
- Country: Hong Kong
- Sport: Badminton
- Event: Men's doubles

Ng Pak Kum (born 8 October 1968) is a Hong Kong former badminton player. He competed in the men's doubles tournament at the 1992 Summer Olympics.
