= Gordon Haldane =

Scottish international badminton player

Personal information
- Nationality: British (Scottish)
- Born: June 1970

Sport
- Sport: Badminton
- Club: Kirkcaldy

Gordon Haldane (born June 1970) is a former international badminton player from Scotland who competed at the Commonwealth Games.

== Biography ==
Haldane was born in 1970 and his younger sister Jillian Haldane was also an international player. He attended Kirkcaldy High School, studied at Edinburgh Napier University and was based in Kirkcaldy.

Haldane represented Scotland at international level, making his full debut for Scotland in 1990 as a 19-year-old. In 1992 he formed a new doubles partnership with Alastair Gatt.

Haldane represented the Scottish team at the 1994 Commonwealth Games in Victoria, Canada, where he competed in the badminton events and reached the quarter finals of the men's doubles with Bruce Flockhart.
