= Alastair Gatt =

Scottish international badminton player

Personal information
- Nationality: British (Scottish)
- Born: 3 March 1966

Sport
- Sport: Badminton
- Club: Edinburgh
Medal record
Representing Scotland
Commonwealth Games
| Bronze medal – third place | 2002 Manchester | Mixed team |
Scottish Nationals
| Gold medal – first place | 1996, 2000, 01, 03 | doubles |
Scottish Open
| Gold medal – first place | 2000 | Doubles |

Alastair Morrison Gatt (born 3 March 1966) is a former international badminton player from Scotland who competed at two Commonwealth Games.

== Biography ==
Gatt born in 1966, was from Aberdeen and was a solicitor by profession. He represented Scotland at international level and attended his first major tournament for his nation at the 1992 Thomas Cup.

In 1992 he formed a new doubles partnership with Gordon Haldane and two years later in 1994 doubled up with Russell Hogg. In 1996, he partnered up with Craig Robertson and it was this doubles team that gained success, winning their first Scottish National Badminton Championships in 1996.

Gatt subsequently represented the Scottish team at the 1998 Commonwealth Games in Kuala Lumpur, Malaysia, where he competed in the badminton events.

At the 2002 Commonwealth Games he once again partnered Craig Robertson in the doubles and won a mixed team bronze medal.

He won three more doubles titles (two with Robertson) at the National Badminton Championships in 2000, 2001 and 2003.
