= Thomas Reidy =

American badminton player (born 1968)

Personal information
- Born: November 26, 1968 (age 57) Brooklyn, New York, United States

Sport
- Country: United States
- Sport: Badminton

Thomas Reidy (born November 26, 1968) is an American former badminton player. He competed in two events at the 1992 Summer Olympics. He was the first ever American player to captured the World Grand Prix title by winning the 1995 Bulgarian Open in the men's doubles with Kevin Han. Reidy later became the high performance director of Badminton Ireland.
