= Ivan Ivanov (badminton) =

Bulgarian badminton player

Personal information
- Born: Ivan Dobrev Ivanov; 19 February 1966 (age 60) Stara Zagora, Bulgaria
- Height: 182 cm (6 ft 0 in)

Sport
- Country: Bulgaria
- Sport: Badminton
- Handedness: right handed
- Coached by: Vladimir Stojanov

Men's singles
- Highest ranking: 48

Ivan Dobrev Ivanov (Bulgarian: Иван Добрев Иванов) (born 19 February 1966) is a retired male badminton player from Bulgaria. He won two titles in men's doubles and mixed doubles at the Cyprus International in 1990.

== Career ==
In 1990, Ivanov competed in three events at the Cyprus International. He reached the men's singles final but lost to compatriot Stojan Ivantchev. He then won the men's doubles and the mixed doubles event by beating his compatriot he lost to in men's singles. Ivanov competed in badminton at the 1992 Summer Olympics in men's singles. He lost in the first round to Deepankar Bhattacharya, of India, with the scores being 15-4, 15-1.

== Achievements ==
=== IBF International ===
Men's singles

Year	Tournament	Opponent	Score	Result
1990	Cyprus International	(Bulgaria) Stojan Ivantchev	17–15, 7–15, 9–15	(silver) Runner-up

Men's doubles

Year	Tournament	Partner	Opponent	Score	Result
1990	Cyprus International	(Bulgaria) Pentcho Stojnov	(Bulgaria) Stojan Ivantchev (Cyprus) Nicolas Pissis	15–12, 15–9	(gold) Winner

Men's doubles

Year	Tournament	Partner	Opponent	Score	Result
1990	Cyprus International	(Cyprus) Diana Knekna	(Bulgaria) Stojan Ivantchev (Belgium) Anetha Stambolizska	15–5, 15–3	(gold) Winner
