= Ron Michels =

Dutch badminton player

Personal information
- Full name: Ronny Martinus Maria "Ron" Michels
- Country: Netherlands
- Born: 23 July 1965 (age 59); Tilburg, North Brabant, Netherlands
- Height: 1.8 m (5 ft 11 in)
- Handedness: Right
Medal record
Men's badminton
Representing Netherlands
European Championships
Bronze medal – third place	1992 Glasgow	Mixed doubles
Bronze medal – third place	1994 Den Bosch	Mixed doubles
Bronze medal – third place	1996 Herning	Mixed doubles
- BWF profile

Ron Michels (born 23 July 1965) is a Dutch badminton player. Michels competed in two events at the 1996 Summer Olympics.
