= Yasen Borisov =

Bulgarian badminton player (born 1970)

Personal information
- Full name: Yasen Hernaniev Borisov
- Nationality: Bulgarian
- Born: 9 May 1970 (age 54); Sofia, Bulgaria

Sport
- Sport: Badminton

Yasen Borisov (Bulgarian: Ясен Борисов; born 9 May 1970) is a Bulgarian badminton player. He competed in two events at the 1992 Summer Olympics.
