= Chan Siu Kwong =

Hong Kong badminton player (born 1966)

Chan Siu Kwong 陳兆光

Personal information
- Country: Hong Kong
- Born: 30 May 1966 (age 59)
- Height: 1.85 m (6 ft 1 in)
- Weight: 79 kg (174 lb)
Medal record
Men's badminton
Representing Hong Kong
Commonwealth Games
Bronze medal – third place	1990 Auckland	Mixed team
Bronze medal – third place	1994 Victoria	Mixed team
Asian Championships
Silver medal – second place	1992 Kuala Lumpur	Mixed doubles
East Asian Games
Bronze medal – third place	1993 Shanghai	Mixed doubles
Bronze medal – third place	1993 Shanghai	Men's team

Chan Siu Kwong (Chinese: 陳兆光; born 30 May 1966), also known as Brian Chan, is a Hong Kong former badminton player. He competed at the 1992 Summer Olympics and the 1996 Summer Olympics.
