= David Humble =

Canadian badminton player (born 1967)

Personal information
- Full name: David Gerard M. Humble
- Born: 6 March 1967 (age 59) Dumfries, Dumfries and Galloway, United Kingdom

Sport
- Country: Canada
- Sport: Badminton
- Handedness: Right
- Career record: 52 wins, 39 losses
- BWF profile
Medal record
Men's badminton
Representing Canada
Commonwealth Games
Silver medal – second place	1990 Auckland	Mixed team

David Gerard M. Humble (born 6 March 1967 in Dumfries, United Kingdom) is a retired badminton player from Canada.

Born in the United Kingdom, he later moved to Alberta and started to represent Canada in international tournaments.

== Career ==
Humble competed in badminton at the 1992 Summer Olympics in men's singles. He lost in the first round to Darren Hall, of Great Britain, 15–6, 15–4.

He was a finalist at the 1991 Irish International, where he lost 10–15, 3–15 to Jeroen van Dijk of the Netherlands. In 1995, he lost the final of the Australian International to Paul Stevenson. He then competed in the 1995 Australian International Championships. He entered the final but lost to Yifeng Shen.

== Achievements ==
=== BWF International Challenge/Series ===
Men's singles
Year	Tournament	Opponent	Score	Result
1991	Irish International	(Netherlands) Jeroen van Dijk	10–15, 3–15	(silver) Runner-up
1995	Australian International	(Australia) Paul Stevenson	5–15, 5–15	(silver) Runner-up
1995	Australian Championships	(Australia) Yifeng Shen	8–15, 15–11, 5–15	(silver) Runner-up

BWF International Challenge tournament
BWF International Series tournament
