= Anil Kaul =

Canadian badminton player (born 1964)

Personal information
- Born: 25 December 1964 (age 61) Amritsar, Punjab, India
- Height: 1.82 m (6 ft 0 in)
- Weight: 76 kg (168 lb)

Sport
- Country: Canada
- Sport: Badminton
- Handedness: Right
- BWF profile
Medal record
Men's badminton
Representing Canada
Pan American Games
Gold medal – first place	Mar del Plata 1995	Doubles

Anil Kaul (born 25 December 1964) is a retired male badminton player from Canada, who won the gold medal in the inaugural men's doubles competition at the 1995 Pan American Games. He did so alongside Iain Sydie. A resident of Victoria, Manitoba, he represented Canada at the 1992 and 1996 Summer Olympics.

Kaul assumed the presidency of Badminton Canada from 1 July 2015, after being elected by the organizations membership on 14 June, replaces Peter Golding.
