= 1996 Thomas Cup qualification =

Tournament details
- Dates: 18–25 February 1996
- Location: Asian zone: Auckland; European zone: Prague

The qualifying process for the 1996 Thomas Cup took place from 18 to 25 February 1996 to decide the final teams which would play in the final tournament.

== Qualification process ==
The qualification process was divided into two regions, the Asian Zone and the European Zone. Seeded teams received a bye into the second round while unseeded teams competed in the first round for a place in the second round. The first two rounds were played in a round-robin format. Teams in the second round competed for a place in the knockout stages. Semi-final winners in each zone were guaranteed qualification for the final tournament to be held in Hong Kong while the remaining teams competed in a third place playoff match for a place in the final tournament.

Indonesia qualified for the final tournament as defending champions while Hong Kong qualified as hosts.

=== Qualified teams ===
Country	Qualified as	Qualified on	Final appearance
Hong Kong	1996 Thomas Cup hosts	January 1996	1st
Indonesia	1994 Thomas Cup winners	21 May 1994	16th
Malaysia	Asian Zone winners	25 February 1996	16th
China	Asian Zone runners-up	25 February 1996	8th
South Korea	Third place in Asian Zone	25 February 1996	7th
Denmark	European Zone winners	25 February 1996	19th
Sweden	European Zone runners-up	25 February 1996	7th
England	Third place in European Zone	25 February 1996	7th

== Asian Zone ==
The qualification rounds for the Asian Zone were held from 18 to 25 February at Auckland Badminton Hall in Auckland, New Zealand. Twelve teams took part in qualifying for the final tournament. Argentina made their first appearance in the Thomas Cup qualifying rounds.

=== First round ===
==== Group A ====
Pos	Team	Pld	W	L	MF	MA	MD	Pts	Qualification
1	New Zealand	2	2	0	7	3	+4	2	Advance to second round
2	Sri Lanka	2	1	1	4	6	−2	1	
3	Singapore	2	0	2	4	6	−2	0	

Source: International Badminton Federation

New Zealand
4
Auckland Badminton Hall
18 February 1996

Sri Lanka
1

		Result
1	Nick Hall	2 – 0 (18–14, 15–7)	Duminda Jayakody
2	Dean Galt	1 – 2 (15–11, 17–18, 12–15)	Thushara Edirisinghe
3	Jarrod King	2 – 1 (10–15, 18–15, 15–7)	Niroshan Wijekoon
4	Dean Galt; Grant Walker	2 – 0 (15–5, 15–9)	Thushara Edirisinghe; Duminda Jayakody
5	Nick Hall; Glenn Stewart	2 – 0 (15–3, 15–10)	Palinda Halangoda; Niroshan Wijekoon

Singapore
2
Auckland Badminton Hall
19 February 1996

Sri Lanka
3

		Result
1	Tan Sian Peng	1 – 2 (18–17, 10–15, 10–15)	Duminda Jayakody
2	Abdul Hamid Khan	0 – 2 (17–18, 13–18)	Thushara Edirisinghe
3	Lim Ghim Siong	2 – 1 (15–10, 5–15, 15–12)	Niroshan Wijekoon
4	Eric Law; Desmond Tan	0 – 2 (11–15, 5–15)	Thushara Edirisinghe; Duminda Jayakody
5	Patrick Lau; Tan Sian Peng	2 – 0 (15–5, 15–3)	Palinda Halangoda; Niroshan Wijekoon

Singapore
2
Auckland Badminton Hall
20 February 1996

New Zealand
3

		Result
1	Tan Sian Peng	2 – 0 (15–9, 15–4)	Nick Hall
2	Abdul Hamid Khan	2 – 0 (15–9, 15–3)	Jarrod King
3	Lim Ghim Siong	0 – 2 (7–15, 6–15)	Glenn Stewart
4	Patrick Lau; Tan Sian Peng	0 – 2 (7–15, 5–15)	Dean Galt; Grant Walker
5	Eric Law; Desmond Tan	0 – 2 (4–15, 6–15)	Nick Hall; Glenn Stewart

==== Group B ====
Pos	Team	Pld	W	L	MF	MA	MD	Pts	Qualification
1	Australia	2	2	0	10	0	+10	2	Advance to second round
2	Macau	2	1	1	5	5	0	1	
3	Argentina	2	0	2	0	10	−10	0	

Source: International Badminton Federation

Australia
5
Auckland Badminton Hall
18 February 1996

Macau
0

		Result
1	Craig Booley	2 – 0 (15–1, 18–15)	Joaquim Lobo
2	Murray Hocking	2 – 0 (15–2, 15–7)	Sam Kai Chong
3	David Bamford	2 – 0 (15–3, 15–2)	Lam Hou Him
4	Peter Blackburn; Paul Staight	2 – 0 (15–2, 15–3)	Sam Kai Chong; Sam Kin Chong
5	Murray Hocking; Mark Nichols	2 – 0 (15–5, 15–3)	Iek Weng Kai; Joaquim Lobo

Argentina
0
Auckland Badminton Hall
19 February 1996

Macau
5

		Result
1	Jorge Meyer	1 – 2 (15–9, 7–15, 5–15)	Joaquim Lobo
2	Jaroslaw Klysz	0 – 2 (7–15, 5–15)	Sam Kai Chong
3	Jorge Possiel	0 – 2 (8–15, 8–15)	Lam Hou Him
4	Jaroslaw Klysz; Jorge Meyer	0 – 2 (5–15, 3–15)	Sam Kai Chong; Sam Kin Chong
5	Guillermo Bronstrup; Michael Garay	0 – 2 (3–15, 6–15)	Iek Weng Kai; Joaquim Lobo

Argentina
0
Auckland Badminton Hall
20 February 1996

Australia
5

		Result
1	Jorge Meyer	0 – 2 (5–15, 3–15)	Murray Hocking
2	Jaroslaw Klysz	0 – 2 (1–15, 1–15)	David Bamford
3	Jorge Possiel	0 – 2 (2–15, 0–15)	Stuart Metcalfe
4	Jaroslaw Klysz; Jorge Meyer	0 – 2 (3–15, 1–15)	Peter Blackburn; Paul Staight
5	Guillermo Bronstrup; Michael Garay	0 – 2 (5–15, 0–15)	Murray Hocking; Mark Nichols

=== Second round ===
==== Group X ====
Pos	Team	Pld	W	L	MF	MA	MD	Pts	Qualification
1	China	3	3	0	15	0	+15	3	Advance to knockout stage
2	South Korea	3	2	1	9	6	+3	2	Advance to knockout stage
3	New Zealand	3	1	2	3	12	−9	1	
4	Japan	3	0	3	3	12	−9	0	

Source: International Badminton Federation

China
5
Auckland Badminton Hall
21 February 1996

New Zealand
0

		Result
1	Dong Jiong	2 – 0 (15–5, 15–2)	Nick Hall
2	Lin Liwen	2 – 0 (15–4, 15–1)	Jarrod King
3	Yu Lizhi	2 – 0 (15–5, 15–1)	Grant Walker
4	Chen Xindong; Liu Jianjun	2 – 0 (15–8, 15–6)	Nick Hall; Glenn Stewart
5	Ge Cheng; Tao Xiaoqiang	2 – 0 (15–4, 15–11)	Dean Galt; Grant Walker

South Korea
4
Auckland Badminton Hall
21 February 1996

Japan
1

		Result
1	Park Sung-woo	2 – 0 (15–6, 15–6)	Fumihiko Machida
2	Kim Hak-kyun	2 – 0 (15–6, 15–6)	Seiichi Watanabe
3	Lee Dong-soo	0 – 2 (9–15, 1–15)	Takahiro Suka
4	Kim Dong-moon; Yoo Yong-sung	2 – 0 (15–1, 15–2)	Fumihiko Machida; Seiichi Watanabe
5	Ha Tae-kwon; Lee Dong-soo	2 – 0 (15–7, 15–5)	Norio Imai; Takahiro Suka

China
5
Auckland Badminton Hall
22 February 1996

Japan
0

		Result
1	Dong Jiong	2 – 0 (15–9, 15–10)	Fumihiko Machida
2	Sun Jun	2 – 0 (15–4, 15–6)	Seiichi Watanabe
3	Yu Lizhi	2 – 0 (15–1, 15–7)	Takahiro Suka
4	Huang Zhanzhong; Jiang Xin	2 – 0 (15–8, 15–12)	Fumihiko Machida; Seiichi Watanabe
5	Ge Cheng; Tao Xiaoqiang	2 – 0 (15–4, 15–6)	Norio Imai; Takahiro Suka

South Korea
5
Auckland Badminton Hall
22 February 1996

New Zealand
0

		Result
1	Park Sung-woo	2 – 0 (15–3, 15–7)	Nick Hall
2	Lee Gwang-jin	2 – 0 (15–3, 15–8)	Dean Galt
3	Kim Hak-kyun	2 – 0 (15–2, 15–3)	Jarrod King
4	Kim Dong-moon; Yoo Yong-sung	2 – 0 (15–7, 15–5)	Dean Galt; Grant Walker
5	Ha Tae-kwon; Lee Dong-soo	2 – 0 (15–7, 15–2)	Nick Hall; Glenn Stewart

China
5
Auckland Badminton Hall
23 February 1996

South Korea
0

		Result
1	Dong Jiong	2 – 0 (15–6, 15–2)	Kim Hak-kyun
2	Sun Jun	2 – 0 (15–4, 15–6)	Kim Dong-moon
3	Lin Liwen	2 – 0 (15–5, 15–1)	Lee Dong-soo
4	Huang Zhanzhong; Jiang Xin	2 – 0 (15–11, 15–5)	Ha Tae-kwon; Lee Gwang-jin
5	Ge Cheng; Tao Xiaoqiang	2 – 0 (15–1, 15–1)	Park Sung-woo; Yoo Yong-sung

New Zealand
3
Auckland Badminton Hall
23 February 1996

Japan
2

		Result
1	Nick Hall	2 – 0 (15–9, 15–10)	Fumihiko Machida
2	Dean Galt	0 – 2 (11–15, 9–15)	Seiichi Watanabe
3	Glenn Stewart	1 – 2 (17–15, 11–15, 14–17)	Takahiro Suka
4	Dean Galt; Grant Walker	2 – 1 (4–15, 18–17, 15–13)	Fumihiko Machida; Seiichi Watanabe
5	Nick Hall; Glenn Stewart	2 – 0 (15–7, 17–15)	Norio Imai; Takahiro Suka

==== Group Y ====
Pos	Team	Pld	W	L	MF	MA	MD	Pts	Qualification
1	Malaysia	3	3	0	15	0	+15	3	Advance to knockout stage
2	Chinese Taipei	3	2	1	6	9	−3	2	Advance to knockout stage
3	Thailand	3	1	2	7	8	−1	1	
4	Australia	3	0	3	2	13	−11	0	

Source: International Badminton Federation

Malaysia
5
Auckland Badminton Hall
21 February 1996

Chinese Taipei
0

		Result
1	Rashid Sidek	2 – 0 (15–9, 15–9)	Fung Permadi
2	Ong Ewe Hock	2 – 0 (15–12, 15–8)	Chang Jeng-shyung
3	Pang Chen	2 – 0 (15–2, 15–1)	Wu Chun-sheng
4	Cheah Soon Kit; Yap Kim Hock	2 – 0 (15–10, 15–4)	Horng Shin-jeng; Liu En-hung
5	Soo Beng Kiang; Tan Kim Her	2 – 0 (15–6, 15–1)	Lee Sung-yuan; Wu Chun-sheng

Thailand
5
Auckland Badminton Hall
21 February 1996

Australia
0

		Result
1	Kittipon Kittikul	2 – 0 (15–12, 15–8)	Craig Booley
2	Apichai Thiraratsakul	2 – 0 (15–8, 15–12)	Murray Hocking
3	Natapol Sarawan	2 – 0 (15–9, 17–14)	Stuart Metcalfe
4	Pramote Teerawiwatana; Sakrapee Thongsari	2 – 0 (15–6, 15–7)	Peter Blackburn; Paul Staight
5	Siripong Siripool; Khunakorn Sudhisodhi	2 – 0 (15–1, 15–9)	David Bamford; Mark Nichols

Malaysia
5
Auckland Badminton Hall
22 February 1996

Australia
0

		Result
1	Rashid Sidek	2 – 0 (15–1, 15–1)	Murray Hocking
2	Ong Ewe Hock	2 – 0 (15–7, 15–10)	Stuart Metcalfe
3	Pang Chen	2 – 0 (15–1, 15–1)	David Bamford
4	Cheah Soon Kit; Yap Kim Hock	2 – 0 (15–11, 15–2)	Peter Blackburn; Paul Staight
5	Soo Beng Kiang; Tan Kim Her	2 – 0 (15–9, 15–10)	Murray Hocking; Mark Nichols

Thailand
2
Auckland Badminton Hall
22 February 1996

Chinese Taipei
3

		Result
1	Kittipon Kittikul	0 – 2 (6–15, 4–15)	Fung Permadi
2	Apichai Thiraratsakul	1 – 2 (1–15, 15–9, 4–15)	Wu Chun-sheng
3	Natapol Sarawan	0 – 2 (5–15, 8–15)	Liu En-hung
4	Siripong Siripool; Khunakorn Sudhisodhi	2 – 0 (15–5, 15–2)	Lee Sung-yuan; Wu Chun-seng
5	Pramote Teerawiwatana; Sakrapee Thongsari	2 – 0 (18–14, 15–6)	Horng Shin-jeng; Liu En-hung

Malaysia
5
Auckland Badminton Hall
23 February 1996

Thailand
0

		Result
1	Rashid Sidek	2 – 0 (15–3, 15–4)	Kittipon Kittikul
2	Ong Ewe Hock	2 – 0 (15–12, 15–8)	Apichai Thiraratsakul
3	Pang Chen	2 – 0 (15–3, 15–4)	Natapol Sarawan
4	Soo Beng Kiang; Tan Kim Her	2 – 1 (2–15, 15–5, 15–13)	Siripong Siripool; Khunakorn Sudhisodhi
5	Choong Tan Fook; Lee Wan Wah	2 – 1 (15–7, 15–17, 15–6)	Kittipon Kittikul; Sakrapee Thongsari

Chinese Taipei
3
Auckland Badminton Hall
23 February 1996

Australia
2

		Result
1	Fung Permadi	2 – 0 (15–6, 15–5)	Craig Booley
2	Chang Jeng-shyung	2 – 0 (15–9, 15–12)	Stuart Metcalfe
3	Liu En-hung	2 – 0 (15–4, 15–4)	David Bamford
4	Horng Shin-jeng; Huang Chuan-chen	0 – 2 (11–15, 5–15)	Peter Blackburn; Paul Staight
5	Lee Sung-yuan; Liu En-hung	1 – 2 (15–13, 2–15, 12–15)	Murray Hocking; Mark Nichols

=== Knockout stage ===
Semi-finals
China	5
Chinese Taipei	0
South Korea	1
Malaysia	4

Final
China	2
Malaysia	3
Third place
Chinese Taipei	0
South Korea	5

==== Semi-finals ====
China
5
Auckland Badminton Hall
24 February 1996

Chinese Taipei
0

		Result
1	Dong Jiong	2 – 0 (15–1, 15–9)	Fung Permadi
2	Sun Jun	2 – 0 (15–10, 15–3)	Chang Jeng-shyung
3	Lin Liwen	2 – 0 (15–7, 15–6)	Wu Chun-sheng
4	Huang Zhanzhong; Jiang Xin	2 – 0 (15–1, 15–3)	Horng Shin-jeng; Huang Chuan-chen
5	Chen Xindong; Liu Jianjun	2 – 0 (15–3, 15–1)	Lee Sung-yuan; Wu Chun-sheng

Malaysia
4
Auckland Badminton Hall
24 February 1996

South Korea
1

		Result
1	Rashid Sidek	2 – 0 (15–12, 15–4)	Park Sung-woo
2	Ong Ewe Hock	2 – 0 (15–12, 15–4)	Lee Gwang-jin
3	Pang Chen	2 – 0 (15–2, 15–1)	Kim Hak-kyun
4	Cheah Soon Kit; Yap Kim Hock	2 – 0 (15–5, 15–13)	Ha Tae-kwon; Lee Dong-soo
5	Soo Beng Kiang; Tan Kim Her	0 – 2 (5–15, 6–15)	Kim Dong-moon; Park Joo-bong

==== Third place ====
South Korea
5
Auckland Badminton Hall
25 February 1996

Chinese Taipei
0

		Result
1	Park Sung-woo	2 – 0 (15–7, 15–4)	Fung Permadi
2	Lee Gwang-jin	2 – 1 (11–15, 15–4, 15–12)	Chang Jeng-shyung
3	Kim Hak-kyun	2 – 0 (15–9, 15–7)	Liu En-hung
4	Kim Dong-moon; Yoo Yong-sung	2 – 0 (15–7, 15–8)	Huang Chuan-chen; Lee Sung-yuan
5	Ha Tae-kwon; Park Joo-bong	2 – 0 (15–0, 15–6)	Horng Shin-jeng; Liu En-hung

==== Final ====
Malaysia
3
Auckland Badminton Hall
25 February 1996

China
2

		Result
1	Rashid Sidek	2 – 1 (10–15, 18–17, 15–3)	Dong Jiong
2	Ong Ewe Hock	1 – 2 (14–17, 15–11, 13–15)	Sun Jun
3	Pang Chen	2 – 0 (15–10, 17–14)	Yu Lizhi
4	Cheah Soon Kit; Yap Kim Hock	2 – 0 (15–6, 15–9)	Huang Zhanzhong; Jiang Xin
5	Soo Beng Kiang; Tan Kim Her	1 – 2 (13–15, 15–6, 13–15)	Ge Cheng; Tao Xiaoqiang

== European Zone ==
The European qualifying rounds were held in Průhonice Hall in Prague, Czech Republic.

=== First round ===
==== Group A ====
Pos	Team	Pld	W	L	MF	MA	MD	Pts	Qualification
1	Canada	2	2	0	10	0	+10	2	Advance to second round
2	Spain	2	1	1	3	7	−4	1	
3	South Africa	2	0	2	2	8	−6	0	
4	Suriname	0	0	0	0	0	0	0	Withdrew

Source: International Badminton Federation

South Africa
2
Průhonice Hall
18 February 1996

Spain
3

		Result
1	Johan Kleingeld	2 – 1	David Serrano
2	Nico Meerholz	1 – 2	Arturo Ruiz
3	Anton Kriel	1 – 2	José Antonio Torres
4	Johan Kleingeld; Paul Woodroffe	1 – 2	Arturo Ruiz; Ernesto García
5	Anton Kriel; Nico Meerholz	2 – 1	David Serrano; José Antonio Torres

Canada
5
Průhonice Hall
18 February 1996

Spain
0

		Result
1	Jaimie Dawson	2 – 0	David Serrano
2	Iain Sydie	2 – 0	Arturo Ruiz
3	Mike Beres	2 – 0	José Antonio Torres
4	Iain Sydie; Anil Kaul	2 – 0	Arturo Ruiz; Ernesto García
5	Brent Olynyk; Darryl Yung	2 – 0	David Serrano; José Antonio Torres

Canada
5
Průhonice Hall
19 February 1996

South Africa
0

		Result
1	Jaimie Dawson	2 – 0	Johan Kleingeld
2	Iain Sydie	2 – 0	Nico Meerholz
3	Mike Beres	2 – 0	Anton Kriel
4	Iain Sydie; Anil Kaul	2 – 0	Johan Kleingeld; Paul Woodroffe
5	Brent Olynyk; Darryl Yung	2 – 0	Anton Kriel; Nico Meerholz

==== Group B ====
Pos	Team	Pld	W	L	MF	MA	MD	Pts	Qualification
1	Switzerland	2	2	0	9	1	+8	2	Advance to second round
2	Italy	2	1	1	4	6	−2	1	
3	Israel	2	0	2	2	8	−6	0	
4	Pakistan	0	0	0	0	0	0	0	Withdrew

Source: International Badminton Federation

Switzerland
4
Průhonice Hall
18 February 1996

Italy
1

		Result
1	Thomas Wapp	2 – 0 (15–0, 15–1)	Andreas Pichler
2	Rémy Matthey de l'Etang	2 – 0 (15–7, 15–4)	Ying Liyong
3	Christian Nyffenegger	2 – 0 (15–7, 15–9)	Zhou You
4	Lawrence Chew; Thomas Wapp	2 – 0 (15–4, 15–5)	Enrico La Rosa; Christian Hinteregger
5	Christian Nyffenegger; Stephan Wapp	0 – 2 (12–15, 7–15)	Ying Liyong; Zhou You

Switzerland
5
Průhonice Hall
18 February 1996

Israel
0

		Result
1	Thomas Wapp	2 – 0 (15–7, 15–9)	Leon Pougatch
2	Rémy Matthey de l'Etang	2 – 0 (15–2, 15–11)	Eli Raymond
3	Stephan Baeriswyl	2 – 0 (15–5, 15–7)	Meni Gershon
4	Christian Nyffenegger; Stephan Wapp	2 – 1 (11–15, 15–11, 15–8)	Leon Pougatch; Eli Raymond
5	Pascal Bircher; Lawrence Chew	2 – 0 (15–7, 15–9)	Amir Moses; Reuven Moses

Italy
3
Průhonice Hall
19 February 1996

Israel
2

		Result
1	Andreas Pichler	1 – 2	Leon Pougatch
2	Ying Liyong	2 – 1	Eli Raymond
3	Zhou You	2 – 0	Meni Gershon
4	Enrico La Rosa; Christian Hinteregger	1 – 2	Leon Pougatch; Eli Raymond
5	Ying Liyong; Zhou You	2 – 0	Amir Moses; Reuven Moses

==== Group C ====
Pos	Team	Pld	W	L	MF	MA	MD	Pts	Qualification
1	Poland	3	3	0	14	1	+13	3	Advance to second round
2	France	3	2	1	11	4	+7	2	
3	Estonia	3	1	2	4	11	−7	1	
4	Brazil	3	0	3	1	14	−13	0	

Source: International Badminton Federation

Poland
5
Průhonice Hall
18 February 1996

Estonia
0

		Result
1	Dariusz Zięba	2 – 0 (15–11, 15–2)	Heiki Sorge
2	Jacek Niedźwiedzki	2 – 0 (15–4, 15–2)	Einar Veede
3	Michał Łogosz	2 – 0 (15–2, 15–3)	Meelis Maiste
4	Robert Mateusiak; Damian Pławecki	2 – 0 (15–10, 15–2)	Raul Tikk; Einar Veede
5	Michał Łogosz; Dariusz Zięba	2 – 0 (15–2, 15–6)	Meelis Maiste; Heiki Sorge

France
5
Průhonice Hall
18 February 1996

Brazil
0

		Result
1	Étienne Thobois	2 – 0	Paulo Fam
2	Bertrand Gallet	2 – 0	Leandro Santos
3	Nabil Lasmari	2 – 0	Ricardo Trevelin
4	Manuel Dubrulle; Vincent Laigle	2 – 0	Guilherme Kumasaka; Paulo von Scala
5	David Cocagne; Étienne Thobois	2 – 0	Leandro Santos; Ricardo Trevelin

Poland
4
Průhonice Hall
20 February 1996

France
1

		Result
1	Dariusz Zięba	2 – 0	Étienne Thobois
2	Jacek Niedźwiedzki	2 – 1	Bertrand Gallet
3	Michał Łogosz	1 – 2	Nabil Lasmari
4	Robert Mateusiak; Damian Pławecki	2 – 1	Manuel Dubrulle; Vincent Laigle
5	Michał Łogosz; Dariusz Zięba	2 – 1	David Cocagne; Étienne Thobois

Estonia
4
Průhonice Hall
20 February 1996

Brazil
1

		Result
1	Heiki Sorge	2 – 0	Paulo Fam
2	Einar Veede	2 – 0	Leandro Santos
3	Meelis Maiste	0 – 2	Guilherme Kumasaka
4	Raul Tikk; Einar Veede	2 – 0	Paulo Fam; Leandro Santos
5	Meelis Maiste; Heiki Sorge	2 – 0	Guilherme Kumasaka; Ricardo Trevelin

Poland
5
Průhonice Hall
21 February 1996

Brazil
0

		Result
1	Dariusz Zięba	2 – 0	Paulo Fam
2	Jacek Niedźwiedzki	2 – 0	Leandro Santos
3	Michał Łogosz	2 – 0	Guilherme Kumasaka
4	Robert Mateusiak; Damian Pławecki	2 – 0	Paulo Fam; Leandro Santos
5	Michał Łogosz; Dariusz Zięba	2 – 0	Guilherme Kumasaka; Ricardo Trevelin

France
5
Průhonice Hall
21 February 1996

Estonia
0

		Result
1	Étienne Thobois	2 – 0	Heiki Sorge
2	Bertrand Gallet	2 – 0	Kaupo Raid
3	Nabil Lasmari	2 – 1	Meelis Maiste
4	Manuel Dubrulle; Vincent Laigle	2 – 0	Raul Tikk; Einar Veede
5	David Cocagne; Étienne Thobois	2 – 0	Heiki Sorge; Meelis Maiste

==== Group D ====
Pos	Team	Pld	W	L	MF	MA	MD	Pts	Qualification
1	Germany	3	3	0	15	0	+15	3	Advance to second round
2	United States	3	2	1	10	5	+5	2	
3	Slovenia	3	1	2	5	10	−5	1	
4	Malta	3	0	3	0	15	−15	0	

Source: International Badminton Federation

Germany
5
Průhonice Hall
18 February 1996

Slovenia
0

		Result
1	Oliver Pongratz	2 – 0	Andrej Pohar
2	Detlef Poste	2 – 0	Kristian Hajnšek
3	Marek Bujak	2 – 0	Jaka Pelhan
4	Michael Helber; Michael Keck	2 – 0	Andrej Pohar; Miha Šepec
5	Stephan Kuhl; Björn Siegemund	2 – 0	Mišo Mattias; Jaka Pelhan

United States
5
Průhonice Hall
18 February 1996

Malta
0

		Result
1	Kevin Han	2 – 0 (15–1, 15–1)	Kenneth Vella
2	David Shaw	2 – 0 (15–1, 15–2)	Aldo Polidano
3	Mark Manha	2 – 0 (15–5, 15–4)	Noel Buttigieg
4	Kevin Han; Thomas Reidy	2 – 0 (15–2, 15–3)	Aldo Polidano; Kenneth Vella
5	Mike Edstrom; Chris Hales	2 – 0 (15–1, 15–4)	Edmond Abela; Simon Spiteri

Germany
5
Průhonice Hall
19 February 1996

United States
0

		Result
1	Oliver Pongratz	2 – 1 (12–15, 15–10, 15–4)	Kevin Han
2	Detlef Poste	2 – 0 (15–12, 15–6)	Thomas Reidy
3	Marek Bujak	2 – 1 (15–6, 13–15, 15–3)	David Shaw
4	Michael Helber; Michael Keck	2 – 0 (15–9, 15–6)	Kevin Han; Thomas Reidy
5	Stephan Kuhl; Björn Siegemund	2 – 0 (15–2, 15–3)	Mike Edstrom; Chris Hales

Slovenia
5
Průhonice Hall
19 February 1996

Malta
0

		Result
1	Andrej Pohar	2 – 0	Kenneth Vella
2	Kristian Hajnšek	2 – 0	Aldo Polidano
3	Jaka Pelhan	2 – 0	Noel Buttigieg
4	Andrej Pohar; Miha Šepec	2 – 0	Aldo Polidano; Kenneth Vella
5	Mišo Mattias; Jaka Pelhan	2 – 0	Edmond Abela; Simon Spiteri

Germany
5
Průhonice Hall
20 February 1996

Malta
0

		Result
1	Oliver Pongratz	2 – 0	Kenneth Vella
2	Detlef Poste	2 – 0	Aldo Polidano
3	Marek Bujak	2 – 0	Noel Buttigieg
4	Michael Helber; Michael Keck	2 – 0	Aldo Polidano; Kenneth Vella
5	Stephan Kuhl; Björn Siegemund	2 – 0	Edmond Abela; Simon Spiteri

United States
5
Průhonice Hall
20 February 1996

Slovenia
0

		Result
1	Kevin Han	2 – 0 (15–5, 15–3)	Andrej Pohar
2	David Shaw	2 – 0 (15–4, 15–9)	Kristian Hajnšek
3	Mark Manha	2 – 0 (15–10, 15–5)	Jaka Pelhan
4	Kevin Han; Thomas Reidy	2 – 0 (15–3, 15–9)	Andrej Pohar; Miha Šepec
5	Mike Edstrom; Chris Hales	2 – 1 (16–17, 15–10, 15–7)	Mišo Mattias; Jaka Pelhan

==== Group E ====
Pos	Team	Pld	W	L	MF	MA	MD	Pts	Qualification
1	Belarus	3	3	0	11	4	+7	3	Advance to second round
2	Ukraine	3	2	1	12	3	+9	2	
3	Czech Republic	3	1	2	7	8	−1	1	
4	Cyprus	3	0	3	0	15	−15	0	

Source: International Badminton Federation

Belarus
3
Průhonice Hall
18 February 1996

Ukraine
2

		Result
1	Mikhail Korshuk	2 – 1	Vladislav Druzchenko
2	Vyatcheslav Roudnitski	1 – 2	Konstantin Tatranov
3	Andrei Malioutin	1 – 2	Dmitry Miznikov
4	Mikhail Korshuk; Vitaliy Shmakov	2 – 1	Valeriy Streltsov; Konstantin Tatranov
5	Andrei Malioutin; Vyatcheslav Roudnitski	2 – 1	Vladislav Druzchenko; Dmitry Miznikov

Czech Republic
5
Průhonice Hall
18 February 1996

Cyprus
0

		Result
1	Tomasz Mendrek	2 – 0	Nicolas Pissis
2	Petr Báša	2 – 0	Tasos Zevlaris
3	Ondřej Lubas	2 – 0	Antonis Lazaros Lazarou
4	Daniel Gaspar; Petr Janda	2 – 0	Savvinos Iasonos; Evandros Votsis
5	Ondřej Lubas; Tomasz Mendrek	2 – 0	Nicolas Pissis; Tasos Zevlaris

Belarus
5
Průhonice Hall
19 February 1996

Czech Republic
0

		Result
1	Mikhail Korshuk	2 – 0	Tomasz Mendrek
2	Vyatcheslav Roudnitski	2 – 0	Petr Báša
3	Andrei Malioutin	2 – 1	Ondřej Lubas
4	Mikhail Korshuk; Vitaliy Shmakov	2 – 0	Daniel Gaspar; Petr Janda
5	Andrei Malioutin; Vyatcheslav Roudnitski	2 – 0	Ondřej Lubas; Tomasz Mendrek

Ukraine
5
Průhonice Hall
19 February 1996

Cyprus
0

		Result
1	Vladislav Druzchenko	2 – 0	Nicolas Pissis
2	Konstantin Tatranov	2 – 0	Tasos Zevlaris
3	Dmitry Miznikov	2 – 0	Antonis Lazaros Lazarou
4	Valeriy Streltsov; Konstantin Tatranov	2 – 0	Savvinos Iasonos; Evandros Votsis
5	Vladislav Druzchenko; Dmitry Miznikov	2 – 0	Nicolas Pissis; Tasos Zevlaris

Belarus
5
Průhonice Hall
20 February 1996

Cyprus
0

		Result
1	Mikhail Korshuk	2 – 0	Nicolas Pissis
2	Vyatcheslav Roudnitski	2 – 0	Tasos Zevlaris
3	Andrei Malioutin	2 – 0	Antonis Lazaros Lazarou
4	Mikhail Korshuk; Vitaliy Shmakov	2 – 0	Savvinos Iasonos; Evandros Votsis
5	Andrei Malioutin; Vyatcheslav Roudnitski	2 – 0	Nicolas Pissis; Tasos Zevlaris

Czech Republic
0
Průhonice Hall
20 February 1996

Ukraine
5

		Result
1	Tomasz Mendrek	1 – 2	Vladislav Druzchenko
2	Petr Báša	1 – 2	Konstantin Tatranov
3	Ondřej Lubas	0 – 2	Dmitry Miznikov
4	Daniel Gaspar; Petr Janda	0 – 2	Valeriy Streltsov; Konstantin Tatranov
5	Ondřej Lubas; Tomasz Mendrek	0 – 2	Vladislav Druzchenko; Dmitry Miznikov

==== Group F ====
Pos	Team	Pld	W	L	MF	MA	MD	Pts	Qualification
1	Norway	2	2	0	9	1	+8	2	Advance to second round
2	Iceland	2	1	1	5	5	0	1	
3	Mauritius	2	0	2	1	9	−8	0	
4	Nepal	0	0	0	0	0	0	0	Withdrew

Source: International Badminton Federation

Norway
5
Průhonice Hall
18 February 1996

Mauritius
0

		Result
1	Hans Sperre Jr.	2 – 1	Eddy Clarisse
2	Erik Lia	2 – 0	Stephan Beeharry
3	Børge Larsen	2 – 0	Vishal Sawaram
4	Erik Lia; Trond Wåland	2 – 0	Stephan Beeharry; Eddy Clarisse
5	Jim Ronny Andersen; Øystein Larsen	2 – 0	Gilles Allet; Geenesh Dussain

Iceland
4
Průhonice Hall
19 February 1996

Mauritius
1

		Result
1	Broddi Kristjánsson	2 – 0 (15–9, 15–7)	Eddy Clarisse
2	Tryggvi Nielsen	2 – 0 (15–8, 17–16)	Stephan Beeharry
3	Þorsteinn Páll Hængsson	1 – 2 (15–7, 11–15, 2–15)	Vishal Sawaram
4	Árni Þór Hallgrímsson; Broddi Kristjánsson	2 – 0 (15–3, 15–7)	Stephan Beeharry; Eddy Clarisse
5	Guðmundur Adolfsson; Þorsteinn Páll Hængsson	2 – 1 (15–5, 12–15, 15–7)	Gilles Allet; Geenesh Dussain

Norway
4
Průhonice Hall
20 February 1996

Iceland
1

		Result
1	Hans Sperre Jr.	2 – 0 (15–4, 15–5)	Broddi Kristjánsson
2	Erik Lia	2 – 0 (15–6, 15–11)	Tryggvi Nielsen
3	Børge Larsen	2 – 0 (15–7, 15–6)	Guðmundur Adolfsson
4	Erik Lia; Trond Wåland	0 – 2 (8–15, 9–15)	Árni Þór Hallgrímsson; Broddi Kristjánsson
5	Jim Ronny Andersen; Hans Sperre Jr.	2 – 0 (15–9, 15–4)	Þorsteinn Páll Hængsson; Tryggvi Nielsen

==== Group G ====
Pos	Team	Pld	W	L	MF	MA	MD	Pts	Qualification
1	Bulgaria	3	3	0	14	1	+13	3	Advance to second round
2	Peru	3	2	1	10	5	+5	2	
3	Jamaica	3	1	2	6	9	−3	1	
4	Kazakhstan	3	0	3	0	15	−15	0	

Source: International Badminton Federation

Bulgaria
5
Průhonice Hall
18 February 1996

Jamaica
0

		Result
1	Todor Velkov	2 – 0	Garth Walker
2	Mihail Popov	2 – 0	Roy Paul Jr.
3	Boris Kesov	2 – 0	Robert Richards
4	Mihail Popov; Svetoslav Stoyanov	2 – 0	Kingsley Ford; Paul Leyow
5	Boris Kesov; Todor Velkov	2 – 0	Roy Paul Jr. Robert Richards

Peru
5
Průhonice Hall
18 February 1996

Kazakhstan
0

		Result
1	Mario Carulla	2 – 1	Igor Dmitriev
2	José Iturriaga	2 – 0	Anton Tiajkoun
3	Gustavo Salazar	2 – 0	Konstantin Dubs
4	Mario Carulla; José Iturriaga	2 – 0	Maxim Kruglik; Anton Tiajkoun
5	Gustavo Salazar; Federico Valdez	2 – 0	Igor Dmitriev; Konstantin Dubs

Bulgaria
5
Průhonice Hall
19 February 1996

Kazakhstan
0

		Result
1	Todor Velkov	2 – 1	Igor Dmitriev
2	Mihail Popov	2 – 0	Anton Tiajkoun
3	Boris Kesov	2 – 1	Konstantin Dubs
4	Mihail Popov; Svetoslav Stoyanov	2 – 0	Maxim Kruglik; Anton Tiajkoun
5	Boris Kesov; Todor Velkov	2 – 0	Igor Dmitriev; Konstantin Dubs

Peru
5
Průhonice Hall
19 February 1996

Jamaica
0

		Result
1	Mario Carulla	2 – 0	Garth Walker
2	José Iturriaga	1 – 2	Roy Paul Jr.
3	Gustavo Salazar	2 – 1	Robert Richards
4	Mario Carulla; José Iturriaga	2 – 0	Kingsley Ford; Paul Leyow
5	Gustavo Salazar; Federico Valdez	2 – 0	Roy Paul Jr. Robert Richards

Bulgaria
4
Průhonice Hall
20 February 1996

Peru
1

		Result
1	Todor Velkov	2 – 1	Mario Carulla
2	Mihail Popov	2 – 0	José Iturriaga
3	Boris Kesov	1 – 2	Gustavo Salazar
4	Mihail Popov; Svetoslav Stoyanov	2 – 0	Mario Carulla; José Iturriaga
5	Boris Kesov; Todor Velkov	2 – 1	Gustavo Salazar; Federico Valdez

Jamaica
5
Průhonice Hall
20 February 1996

Kazakhstan
0

		Result
1	Garth Walker	2 – 0	Anton Tiajkoun
2	Roy Paul Jr.	2 – 1	Konstantin Dubs
3	Robert Richards	2 – 0	Andrey Zlatkovskiy
4	Kingsley Ford; Paul Leyow	2 – 0	Maxim Kruglik; Anton Tiajkoun
5	Roy Paul Jr. Robert Richards	2 – 1	Igor Dmitriev; Konstantin Dubs

==== Group H ====
Pos	Team	Pld	W	L	MF	MA	MD	Pts	Qualification
1	India	3	3	0	14	1	+13	3	Advance to second round
2	Portugal	3	2	1	9	6	+3	2	
3	Wales	3	1	2	7	8	−1	1	
4	Slovakia	3	0	3	0	15	−15	0	

Source: International Badminton Federation

India
5
Průhonice Hall
18 February 1996

Slovakia
0

		Result
1	Dipankar Bhattacharjee	2 – 0	Juraj Brestovský
2	Pullela Gopichand	2 – 0	Igor Novák
3	Srikant Bakshi	2 – 0	Marián Šulko
4	Jaseel P. Ismail; Vijaydeep Singh	2 – 0	Juraj Brestovský; Igor Novák
5	Pullela Gopichand; Vijay Lancy	2 – 0	Marek Navrátil; Marián Šulko

Portugal
3
Průhonice Hall
18 February 1996

Wales
2

		Result
1	Fernando Silva	1 – 2	Richard Vaughan
2	Ricardo Fernandes	2 – 1	John Leung
3	Hugo Rodrigues	1 – 2	Geraint Lewis
4	Ricardo Fernandes; Fernando Silva	2 – 0	John Leung; Richard Vaughan
5	Hugo Rodrigues; Marco Vasconcelos	2 – 0	Andrew Groves-Burke; Geraint Lewis

India
4
Průhonice Hall
19 February 1996

Portugal
1

		Result
1	Dipankar Bhattacharjee	2 – 0	Fernando Silva
2	Pullela Gopichand	2 – 1	Ricardo Fernandes
3	Srikant Bakshi	2 – 0	Hugo Rodrigues
4	Jaseel P. Ismail; Vijaydeep Singh	2 – 0	Ricardo Fernandes; Fernando Silva
5	Pullela Gopichand; Vijay Lancy	1 – 2	Hugo Rodrigues; Marco Vasconcelos

Wales
5
Průhonice Hall
19 February 1996

Slovakia
0

		Result
1	Richard Vaughan	2 – 0	Juraj Brestovský
2	John Leung	2 – 0	Igor Novák
3	Geraint Lewis	2 – 0	Marián Šulko
4	John Leung; Richard Vaughan	2 – 0	Juraj Brestovský; Igor Novák
5	Andrew Groves-Burke; Geraint Lewis	2 – 0	Marek Navrátil; Marián Šulko

India
5
Průhonice Hall
20 February 1996

Wales
0

		Result
1	Dipankar Bhattacharjee	2 – 0	Richard Vaughan
2	Pullela Gopichand	2 – 0	John Leung
3	Srikant Bakshi	2 – 0	Geraint Lewis
4	Jaseel P. Ismail; Vijaydeep Singh	2 – 0	John Leung; Richard Vaughan
5	Pullela Gopichand; Vijay Lancy	2 – 1	Andrew Groves-Burke; Geraint Lewis

Portugal
5
Průhonice Hall
20 February 1996

Slovakia
0

		Result
1	Fernando Silva	2 – 0	Juraj Brestovský
2	Ricardo Fernandes	2 – 0	Igor Novák
3	Hugo Rodrigues	2 – 0	Marián Šulko
4	Ricardo Fernandes; Fernando Silva	2 – 0	Juraj Brestovský; Igor Novák
5	Hugo Rodrigues; Marco Vasconcelos	2 – 0	Marek Navrátil; Marián Šulko

==== Group I ====
Pos	Team	Pld	W	L	MF	MA	MD	Pts	Qualification
1	Austria	3	3	0	12	3	+9	3	Advance to second round
2	Ireland	3	2	1	10	5	+5	2	
3	Guatemala (Note: Guatemala were called up to replace Iran following the withdrawal of the Iranian team.)	3	1	2	5	10	−5	1	
4	Hungary	3	0	3	3	12	−9	0	
5	Iran	0	0	0	0	0	0	0	Withdrew

Source: International Badminton Federation
Notes:

Austria
4
Průhonice Hall
18 February 1996

Guatemala
1

		Result
1	Jürgen Koch	2 – 0	Kenneth Erichsen
2	Peter Kreulitsch	2 – 0	Christian Erichsen
3	Heimo Götschl	1 – 2	Pedro Yang
4	Heimo Götschl; Hannes Fuchs	2 – 0	Kenneth Erichsen; Renato Rosales
5	Peter Kreulitsch; Christoph Radinger	2 – 0	Christian Erichsen; Pedro Yang

Ireland
4
Průhonice Hall
18 February 1996

Hungary
1

		Result
1	Bruce Topping	2 – 1 (10–15, 15–1, 15–5)	Gyula Szalai
2	Michael Watt	2 – 0 (15–9, 15–9)	Richárd Bánhidi
3	Bustari Eddie	2 – 0 (15–11, 15–8)	Zsolt Kocsis
4	Michael O'Meara; Bruce Topping	2 – 0 (15–1, 15–2)	Ákos Károlyi; Zsolt Kocsis
5	Graham Henderson; Michael Watt	1 – 2 (15–12, 13–15, 6–15)	Richárd Bánhidi; Gyula Szalai

Austria
5
Průhonice Hall
19 February 1996

Hungary
0

		Result
1	Jürgen Koch	2 – 0	Gyula Szalai
2	Peter Kreulitsch	2 – 0	Richárd Bánhidi
3	Heimo Götschl	2 – 0	Zsolt Kocsis
4	Heimo Götschl; Hannes Fuchs	2 – 0	Ákos Károlyi; Zsolt Kocsis
5	Peter Kreulitsch; Christoph Radinger	2 – 0	Richárd Bánhidi; Gyula Szalai

Ireland
5
Průhonice Hall
19 February 1996

Guatemala
0

		Result
1	Bruce Topping	1 – 2	Kenneth Erichsen
2	Michael Watt	2 – 0	Christian Erichsen
3	Bustari Eddie	2 – 1	Pedro Yang
4	Michael O'Meara; Bruce Topping	2 – 0	Kenneth Erichsen; Renato Rosales
5	Graham Henderson; Michael Watt	2 – 0	Christian Erichsen; Pedro Yang

Austria
3
Průhonice Hall
20 February 1996

Ireland
2

		Result
1	Jürgen Koch	2 – 1 (18–17, 11–15, 15–4)	Bruce Topping
2	Peter Kreulitsch	2 – 0 (15–5, 15–11)	Michael Watt
3	Heimo Götschl	2 – 0 (15–4, 15–4)	Bustari Eddie
4	Heimo Götschl; Hannes Fuchs	0 – 2 (2–15, 0–15)	Michael O'Meara; Bruce Topping
5	Jürgen Koch; Christoph Radinger	0 – 2 (11–15, 9–15)	Graham Henderson; Michael Watt

Guatemala
3
Průhonice Hall
20 February 1996

Hungary
2

		Result
1	Kenneth Erichsen	2 – 0	Gyula Szalai
2	Christian Erichsen	1 – 2	Richárd Bánhidi
3	Pedro Yang	2 – 0	Zsolt Kocsis
4	Kenneth Erichsen; Renato Rosales	2 – 1	Ákos Károlyi; Zsolt Kocsis
5	Christian Erichsen; Pedro Yang	1 – 2	Richárd Bánhidi; Gyula Szalai

==== Group J ====
Pos	Team	Pld	W	L	MF	MA	MD	Pts	Qualification
1	Scotland	3	3	0	14	1	+13	3	Advance to second round
2	Belgium	3	2	1	11	4	+7	2	
3	Lithuania	3	1	2	5	10	−5	1	
4	Armenia	3	0	3	0	15	−15	0	

Source: International Badminton Federation

Scotland
5
Průhonice Hall
18 February 1996

Lithuania
0

		Result
1	Bruce Flockhart	2 – 0	Aivaras Kvedarauskas
2	Jim Mailer	2 – 0	Dainius Lukošius
3	Craig Robertson	2 – 0	Donatas Vievesis
4	Alastair Gatt; Craig Robertson	2 – 0	Aivaras Kvedarauskas; Dainius Lukošius
5	Alan McMillan; Kenny Middlemiss	2 – 0	Donatas Narvilas; Donatas Vievesis

Belgium
4
Průhonice Hall
18 February 1996

Armenia
1

		Result
1	Pedro Vanneste	2 – 0	Arsen Khachatryan
2	Stefan de Rijcke	2 – 0	Hayk Misakyan
3	Luigi Dalli Cardillo	2 – 0	Oganes Khachatryan
4	Roel Bollen; Stefan de Rijcke	2 – 0	Hayk Misakyan; Artur Ohanyan
5	Luigi Dalli Cardillo; Pedro Vanneste	2 – 0	Arsen Khachatryan; Oganes Khachatryan

Scotland
5
Průhonice Hall
19 February 1996

Armenia
0

		Result
1	Bruce Flockhart	2 – 0	Arsen Khachatryan
2	Jim Mailer	2 – 0	Hayk Misakyan
3	Craig Robertson	2 – 0	Oganes Khachatryan
4	Alastair Gatt; Craig Robertson	2 – 0	Hayk Misakyan; Artur Ohanyan
5	Alan McMillan; Kenny Middlemiss	2 – 0	Arsen Khachatryan; Oganes Khachatryan

Belgium
5
Průhonice Hall
19 February 1996

Lithuania
0

		Result
1	Pedro Vanneste	2 – 0	Aivaras Kvedarauskas
2	Stefan de Rijcke	2 – 0	Dainius Lukošius
3	Luigi Dalli Cardillo	2 – 0	Donatas Vievesis
4	Roel Bollen; Stefan de Rijcke	2 – 0	Aivaras Kvedarauskas; Dainius Lukošius
5	Luigi Dalli Cardillo; Pedro Vanneste	2 – 0	Donatas Narvilas; Donatas Vievesis

Scotland
4
Průhonice Hall
20 February 1996

Belgium
1

		Result
1	Bruce Flockhart	1 – 2	Pedro Vanneste
2	Jim Mailer	2 – 0	Stefan de Rijcke
3	Craig Robertson	2 – 1	Luigi Dalli Cardillo
4	Alastair Gatt; Craig Robertson	2 – 0	Roel Bollen; Stefan de Rijcke
5	Alan McMillan; Kenny Middlemiss	2 – 0	Luigi Dalli Cardillo; Pedro Vanneste

Lithuania
5
Průhonice Hall
20 February 1996

Armenia
0

		Result
1	Aivaras Kvedarauskas	2 – 0	Arsen Khachatryan
2	Dainius Lukošius	2 – 0	Hayk Misakyan
3	Donatas Narvilas	2 – 0	Oganes Khachatryan
4	Aivaras Kvedarauskas; Donatas Vievesis	2 – 0	Hayk Misakyan; Artur Ohanyan
5	Dainius Lukošius; Donatas Narvilas	2 – 0	Arsen Khachatryan; Oganes Khachatryan

=== Second round ===
==== Group W ====
Pos	Team	Pld	W	L	MF	MA	MD	Pts	Qualification
1	Denmark	3	3	0	15	0	+15	3	Advance to knockout stage
2	Austria	3	1	2	7	8	−1	1	
3	Scotland	3	1	2	5	10	−5	1	
4	Bulgaria	3	1	2	3	12	−9	1	

Source: International Badminton Federation

Denmark
5
Průhonice Hall
21 February 1996

Bulgaria
0

		Result
1	Peter Rasmussen	2 – 0 (15–7, 15–12)	Todor Velkov
2	Thomas Stuer-Lauridsen	2 – 0 (15–4, 15–10)	Mihail Popov
3	Martin Lundgaard Hansen	2 – 0 (15–13, 15–3)	Boris Kesov
4	Jens Eriksen; Christian Jakobsen	2 – 0 (15–13, 15–4)	Mihail Popov; Svetoslav Stoyanov
5	Jim Laugesen; Thomas Stavngaard	2 – 0 (15–3, 15–5)	Boris Kesov; Todor Velkov

Scotland
4
Průhonice Hall
21 February 1996

Austria
1

		Result
1	Bruce Flockhart	2 – 0 (15–1, 15–5)	Hannes Fuchs
2	Jim Mailer	2 – 0 (15–6, 15–7)	Jürgen Koch
3	Craig Robertson	0 – 2 (12–15, 3–15)	Peter Kreulitsch
4	Alastair Gatt; Craig Robertson	2 – 0 (15–9, 15–4)	Hannes Fuchs; Peter Kreulitsch
5	David Gilmour; Kenny Middlemiss	2 – 1 (3–15, 15–11, 15–9)	Heimo Götschl; Jürgen Koch

Denmark
5
Průhonice Hall
22 February 1996

Austria
0

		Result
1	Poul-Erik Høyer Larsen	2 – 0 (18–15, 15–5)	Jürgen Koch
2	Peter Rasmussen	2 – 1 (8–15, 15–10, 15–3)	Peter Kreulitsch
3	Martin Lundgaard Hansen	2 – 0 (18–13, 15–10)	Heimo Götschl
4	Michael Søgaard; Henrik Svarrer	2 – 0 (15–3, 15–3)	Hannes Fuchs; Heimo Götschl
5	Jens Eriksen; Christian Jakobsen	2 – 0 (15–10, 15–3)	Peter Kreulitsch; Christoph Radinger

Scotland
2
Průhonice Hall
22 February 1996

Bulgaria
3

		Result
1	Bruce Flockhart	2 – 0	Todor Velkov
2	Jim Mailer	2 – 0	Mihail Popov
3	Craig Robertson	1 – 2	Boris Kesov
4	Alastair Gatt; Craig Robertson	1 – 2	Mihail Popov; Svetoslav Stoyanov
5	David Gilmour; Kenny Middlemiss	1 – 2	Boris Kesov; Todor Velkov

Denmark
5
Průhonice Hall
23 February 1996

Scotland
0

		Result
1	Thomas Stuer-Lauridsen	2 – 0 (15–10, 15–2)	Bruce Flockhart
2	Martin Lundgaard Hansen	2 – 0 (15–9, 15–8)	Jim Mailer
3	Jim Laugesen	2 – 0 (15–5, 15–2)	Craig Robertson
4	Michael Søgaard; Henrik Svarrer	2 – 1 (15–1, 16–17, 15–2)	Alastair Gatt; Craig Robertson
5	Jens Eriksen; Christian Jakobsen	2 – 0 (15–7, 15–8)	Alan McMillan; Kenny Middlemiss

Austria
5
Průhonice Hall
23 February 1996

Bulgaria
0

		Result
1	Hannes Fuchs	2 – 1	Todor Velkov
2	Jürgen Koch	2 – 0	Mihail Popov
3	Peter Kreulitsch	2 – 0	Boris Kesov
4	Hannes Fuchs; Heimo Götschl	2 – 1	Mihail Popov; Svetoslav Stoyanov
5	Jürgen Koch; Peter Kreulitsch	2 – 1	Boris Kesov; Todor Velkov

==== Group X ====
Pos	Team	Pld	W	L	MF	MA	MD	Pts	Qualification
1	England	3	3	0	13	2	+11	3	Advance to knockout stage
2	Finland	3	2	1	10	5	+5	2	
3	India	3	1	2	6	10	−4	1	
4	Poland	3	0	3	1	14	−13	0	

Source: International Badminton Federation

Finland
4
Průhonice Hall
21 February 1996

India
1

		Result
1	Pontus Jäntti	2 – 0 (15–3, 15–3)	Dipankar Bhattacharjee
2	Robert Liljequist	2 – 1 (15–1, 12–15, 15–12)	Pullela Gopichand
3	Jyri Aalto	2 – 0 (15–8, 15–4)	Srikant Bakshi
4	Mikael Segercrantz; Tony Tuominen	0 – 2 (13–18, 15–18)	Jaseel P. Ismail; Vijaydeep Singh
5	Lasse Lindelöf; Ilkka Nyqvist	2 – 0 (15–6, 15–13)	Pullela Gopichand; Vijay Lancy

England
5
Průhonice Hall
21 February 1996

Poland
0

		Result
1	Darren Hall	2 – 0	Dariusz Zięba
2	Peter Knowles	2 – 0	Jacek Niedźwiedzki
3	Peter Bush	2 – 1	Michał Łogosz
4	Chris Hunt; Nick Ponting	2 – 0	Robert Mateusiak; Damian Pławecki
5	Simon Archer; Nathan Robertson	2 – 0	Michał Łogosz; Dariusz Zięba

Finland
4
Průhonice Hall
22 February 1996

Poland
1

		Result
1	Pontus Jäntti	2 – 0 (15–10, 15–6)	Dariusz Zięba
2	Robert Liljequist	2 – 0 (15–10, 15–4)	Jacek Niedźwiedzki
3	Jyri Aalto	2 – 0 (15–4, 15–1)	Michał Łogosz
4	Mikael Segercrantz; Tony Tuominen	1 – 2 (15–11, 13–15, 6–15)	Robert Mateusiak; Damian Pławecki
5	Lasse Lindelöf; Ilkka Nyqvist	2 – 1 (4–15, 15–11, 15–12)	Michał Łogosz; Dariusz Zięba

England
5
Průhonice Hall
22 February 1996

India
0

		Result
1	Darren Hall	2 – 0	Dipankar Bhattacharjee
2	Peter Knowles	2 – 1	Pullela Gopichand
3	Peter Bush	2 – 1	Srikant Bakshi
4	Chris Hunt; Nick Ponting	2 – 0	Jaseel P. Ismail; Vijaydeep Singh
5	Simon Archer; Nathan Robertson	2 – 0	Pullela Gopichand; Vijay Lancy

Finland
2
Průhonice Hall
23 February 1996

England
3

		Result
1	Pontus Jäntti	1 – 2 (15–10, 11–15, 3–15)	Darren Hall
2	Robert Liljequist	2 – 0 (15–5, 15–8)	Peter Knowles
3	Jyri Aalto	2 – 0 (15–12, 18–17)	Anders Nielsen
4	Mikael Segercrantz; Tony Tuominen	0 – 2 (6–15, 2–15)	Simon Archer; Chris Hunt
5	Lasse Lindelöf; Ilkka Nyqvist	0 – 2 (5–15, 1–15)	Nick Ponting; Julian Robertson

India
5
Průhonice Hall
23 February 1996

Poland
0

		Result
1	Dipankar Bhattacharjee	2 – 1	Dariusz Zięba
2	Pullela Gopichand	2 – 0	Jacek Niedźwiedzki
3	Srikant Bakshi	2 – 0	Michał Łogosz
4	Jaseel P. Ismail; Vijaydeep Singh	2 – 0	Robert Mateusiak; Damian Pławecki
5	Pullela Gopichand; Vijay Lancy	2 – 0	Michał Łogosz; Dariusz Zięba

==== Group Y ====
Pos	Team	Pld	W	L	MF	MA	MD	Pts	Qualification
1	Netherlands	3	3	0	10	5	+5	3	Advance to knockout stage
2	Germany	3	2	1	11	4	+7	2	
3	Russia	3	1	2	8	7	+1	1	
4	Belarus	3	0	3	1	14	−13	0	

Source: International Badminton Federation

Netherlands
3
Průhonice Hall
21 February 1996

Germany
2

		Result
1	Jeroen van Dijk	1 – 2 (2–15, 15–13, 12–15)	Oliver Pongratz
2	Pierre Pelupessy	2 – 1 (12–15, 15–6, 15–5)	Detlef Poste
3	Joris van Soerland	2 – 0 (15–11, 18–17)	Marek Bujak
4	Gerben Bruijstens; Rolf Monteiro	0 – 2 (2–15, 7–15)	Michael Helber; Michael Keck
5	Ron Michels; Quinten van Dalm	2 – 1 (14–18, 15–7, 15–10)	Stephan Kuhl; Björn Siegemund

Russia
5
Průhonice Hall
21 February 1996

Belarus
0

		Result
1	Andrey Antropov	2 – 0	Mikhail Korshuk
2	Pavel Uvarov	2 – 0	Vyatcheslav Roudnitski
3	Viktor Malyutin	2 – 0	Andrei Malioutin
4	Andrey Antropov; Nikolai Zuyev	2 – 0	Mikhail Korshuk; Vitaliy Shmakov
5	Artur Khachaturyan; Sergey Melnikov	2 – 0	Andrei Malioutin; Vyatcheslav Roudnitski

Netherlands
4
Průhonice Hall
22 February 1996

Belarus
1

		Result
1	Jeroen van Dijk	2 – 0 (15–6, 15–6)	Mikhail Korshuk
2	Pierre Pelupessy	2 – 1 (12–15, 15–10, 15–10)	Vyatcheslav Roudnitski
3	Joris van Soerland	2 – 0 (15–3, 15–6)	Andrei Malioutin
4	Gerben Bruijstens; Rolf Monteiro	0 – 2 (8–15, 9–15)	Mikhail Korshuk; Vitaliy Shmakov
5	Ron Michels; Quinten van Dalm	2 – 1 (15–3, 15–7)	Stephan Kuhl; Björn Siegemund

Germany
4
Průhonice Hall
22 February 1996

Russia
1

		Result
1	Oliver Pongratz	2 – 1	Andrey Antropov
2	Detlef Poste	2 – 1	Pavel Uvarov
3	Marek Bujak	2 – 1	Viktor Malyutin
4	Michael Helber; Michael Keck	1 – 2	Andrey Antropov; Nikolai Zuyev
5	Stephan Kuhl; Björn Siegemund	2 – 1	Artur Khachaturyan; Sergey Melnikov

Netherlands
3
Průhonice Hall
23 February 1996

Russia
2

		Result
1	Jeroen van Dijk	2 – 0	Andrey Antropov
2	Pierre Pelupessy	1 – 2	Pavel Uvarov
3	Joris van Soerland	2 – 1	Viktor Malyutin
4	Gerben Bruijstens; Rolf Monteiro	0 – 2	Andrey Antropov; Nikolai Zuyev
5	Ron Michels; Quinten van Dalm	2 – 0	Artur Khachaturyan; Sergey Melnikov

Germany
5
Průhonice Hall
23 February 1996

Belarus
0

		Result
1	Oliver Pongratz	2 – 0	Mikhail Korshuk
2	Detlef Poste	2 – 0	Vyatcheslav Roudnitski
3	Marek Bujak	2 – 0	Andrei Malioutin
4	Michael Helber; Michael Keck	2 – 1	Mikhail Korshuk; Vitaliy Shmakov
5	Stephan Kuhl; Björn Siegemund	2 – 0	Andrei Malioutin; Vyatcheslav Roudnitski

==== Group Z ====
Pos	Team	Pld	W	L	MF	MA	MD	Pts	Qualification
1	Sweden	3	3	0	14	1	+13	3	Advance to knockout stage
2	Canada	3	2	1	10	5	+5	2	
3	Norway	3	1	2	5	10	−5	1	
4	Switzerland	3	0	3	1	14	−13	0	

Source: International Badminton Federation

Sweden
5
Průhonice Hall
21 February 1996

Norway
0

		Result
1	Jens Olsson	2 – 0 (18–13, 15–9)	Jim Ronny Andersen
2	Tomas Johansson	2 – 0 (15–9, 15–8)	Øystein Larsen
3	Rickard Magnusson	2 – 0 (15–4, 15–5)	Børge Larsen
4	Peter Axelsson; Pär-Gunnar Jönsson	2 – 0 (15–3, 15–5)	Erik Lia; Trond Wåland
5	Henrik Andersson; Johan Tholinsson	2 – 0 (15–7, 15–13)	Jim Ronny Andersen; Hans Sperre Jr.

Canada
5
Průhonice Hall
21 February 1996

Switzerland
0

		Result
1	Jaimie Dawson	2 – 0 (18–15, 15–2)	Thomas Wapp
2	Iain Sydie	2 – 0 (15–3, 15–4)	Rémy Matthey de l'Etang
3	Mike Beres	2 – 0 (15–11, 15–5)	Stephan Baeriswyl
4	Anil Kaul; Iain Sydie	2 – 0 (15–5, 15–3)	Christian Nyffenegger; Thomas Wapp
5	Brent Olynyk; Darryl Yung	2 – 0 (15–8, 15–10)	Pascal Bircher; Lawrence Chew

Sweden
5
Průhonice Hall
22 February 1996

Switzerland
0

		Result
1	Rickard Magnusson	2 – 0 (17–14, 15–1)	Thomas Wapp
2	Rasmus Wengberg	2 – 0 (15–10, 15–10)	Rémy Matthey de l'Etang
3	Martin Hagberg	2 – 0 (15–3, 15–8)	Stephan Baeriswyl
4	Peter Axelsson; Pär-Gunnar Jönsson	2 – 0 (15–2, 15–4)	Christian Nyffenegger; Thomas Wapp
5	Fredrik Bergström; Jens Olsson	2 – 0 (15–6, 15–10)	Pascal Bircher; Lawrence Chew

Canada
4
Průhonice Hall
22 February 1996

Norway
1

		Result
1	Jaimie Dawson	1 – 2 (15–8, 7–15, 6–15)	Hans Sperre Jr.
2	Iain Sydie	2 – 0 (15–6, 18–16)	Øystein Larsen
3	Mike Beres	2 – 0 (15–10, 17–14)	Børge Larsen
4	Anil Kaul; Iain Sydie	2 – 0 (15–11, 15–6)	Jim Ronny Andersen; Trond Wåland
5	Brent Olynyk; Darryl Yung	2 – 1 (11–15, 15–10, 15–13)	Erik Lia; Hans Sperre Jr.

Sweden
4
Průhonice Hall
23 February 1996

Canada
1

		Result
1	Jens Olsson	1 – 2	Jaimie Dawson
2	Tomas Johansson	2 – 1	Iain Sydie
3	Rickard Magnusson	2 – 1	Mike Beres
4	Peter Axelsson; Pär-Gunnar Jönsson	2 – 0	Anil Kaul; Iain Sydie
5	Henrik Andersson; Johan Tholinsson	2 – 1	Brent Olynyk; Darryl Yung

Norway
4
Průhonice Hall
23 February 1996

Switzerland
1

		Result
1	Hans Sperre Jr.	0 – 2 (12–15, 4–15)	Thomas Wapp
2	Erik Lia	2 – 0 (15–2, 15–10)	Rémy Matthey de l'Etang
3	Børge Larsen	2 – 0 (15–4, 15–2)	Stephan Baeriswyl
4	Jim Ronny Andersen; Trond Wåland	2 – 0 (15–7, 15–8)	Christian Nyffenegger; Thomas Wapp
5	Øystein Larsen; Erik Lia	2 – 1 (12–15, 15–12, 15–10)	Pascal Bircher; Lawrence Chew

=== Knockout stage ===
Semi-finals
Denmark	4
England	1
Netherlands	1
Sweden	4

Final
Denmark	4
Sweden	1
Third place
England	3
Netherlands	2

==== Semi-finals ====
Denmark
4
Průhonice Hall
24 February 1996

England
1

		Result
1	Poul-Erik Høyer Larsen	2 – 1 (17–14, 16–17, 15–8)	Darren Hall
2	Peter Rasmussen	1 – 2 (7–15, 15–6, 15–7)	Peter Knowles
3	Thomas Stuer-Lauridsen	2 – 1 (15–11, 6–15, 15–1)	Peter Bush
4	Michael Søgaard; Henrik Svarrer	2 – 0 (18–17, 15–13)	Simon Archer; Chris Hunt
5	Jens Eriksen; Christian Jakobsen	2 – 0 (15–8, 15–13)	Neil Cottrill; John Quinn

Sweden
4
Průhonice Hall
24 February 1996

Netherlands
1

		Result
1	Jens Olsson	2 – 0 (15–10, 15–7)	Jeroen van Dijk
2	Tomas Johansson	2 – 0 (15–6, 15–7)	Joris van Soerland
3	Rickard Magnusson	0 – 2 (4–15, 15–17)	Chris Bruil
4	Pär-Gunnar Jönsson; Jens Olsson	2 – 0 (15–9, 15–11)	Ron Michels; Quinten van Dalm
5	Peter Axelsson; Rickard Magnusson	2 – 0 (15–6, 15–6)	Gerben Bruijstens; Rolf Monteiro

==== Third place ====
England
3
Průhonice Hall
25 February 1996

Netherlands
2

		Result
1	Darren Hall	2 – 0 (15–12, 15–6)	Jeroen van Dijk
2	Peter Knowles	2 – 0 (15–3, 15–6)	Pierre Pelupessy
3	Peter Bush	0 – 2 (2–15, 4–15)	Chris Bruil
4	Chris Hunt; Nick Ponting	2 – 0 (15–10, 15–0)	Gerben Bruijstens; Rolf Monteiro
5	Simon Archer; Julian Robertson	0 – 2 (10–15, 16–18)	Ron Michels; Quinten van Dalm

==== Final ====
Denmark
4
Průhonice Hall
25 February 1996

Sweden
1

		Result
1	Poul-Erik Høyer Larsen	2 – 0 (15–12, 15–10)	Jens Olsson
2	Peter Rasmussen	2 – 0 (15–4, 15–5)	Tomas Johansson
3	Thomas Stuer-Lauridsen	2 – 1 (15–8, 14–17, 15–10)	Rickard Magnusson
4	Michael Søgaard; Henrik Svarrer	0 – 2 (6–15, 7–15)	Peter Axelsson; Pär-Gunnar Jönsson
5	Jim Laugesen; Thomas Stavngaard	2 – 0 (18–14, 15–12)	Henrik Andersson; Johan Tholinsson
