= 1998 Thomas Cup qualification =

Tournament details
- Dates: 14–22 February 1998
- Location: Asian zone: Manila; European zone: Sandefjord

The qualifying process for the 1998 Thomas Cup took place from 14 to 22 February 1998 to decide the final teams which would play in the final tournament.

== Qualification process ==
The qualification process was divided into two regions, the Asian Zone and the European Zone. Seeded teams received a bye into the second round while unseeded teams competed in the first round for a place in the second round. The first two rounds were played in a round-robin format. Teams in the second round competed for a place in the knockout stages. Semi-final winners in each zone were guaranteed qualification for the final tournament to be held in Hong Kong while the remaining teams competed in a third place playoff match for a place in the final tournament.

Indonesia qualified for the final tournament as defending champions while Hong Kong qualified as hosts.

=== Qualified teams ===
Country	Qualified as	Qualified on	Final appearance
Hong Kong	1998 Thomas Cup hosts	December 1996	2nd
Indonesia	1996 Thomas Cup winners	25 May 1996	17th
China	Asian Zone winners	22 February 1998	9th
Malaysia	Asian Zone runners-up	22 February 1998	17th
South Korea	Third place in Asian Zone	22 February 1998	8th
Denmark	European Zone winners	21 February 1998	20th
Netherlands	European Zone runners-up	21 February 1998	1st
Sweden	Third place in European Zone	21 February 1998	8th

== Asian Zone ==
The qualification rounds for the Asian Zone were held from 15 to 22 February at the PhilSports Arena in Manila, Philippines. Eighteen teams took part in qualifying for the final tournament.

=== First round ===
==== Group A ====
Pos	Team	Pld	W	L	MF	MA	MD	Pts	Qualification
1	Singapore	3	3	0	13	2	+11	3	Advance to second round
2	Australia	3	2	1	7	8	−1	2	
3	Philippines	3	1	2	8	7	+1	1	
4	Iran (Note: Iran were called up to replace Nigeria following the withdrawal of the Nigerian team.)	3	0	3	2	13	−11	0	
5	Argentina	0	0	0	0	0	0	0	Withdrew
6	Nigeria	0	0	0	0	0	0	0	Withdrew

Source: International Badminton Federation
Notes:

Singapore
4
PhilSports Arena
15 February 1998

Australia
1

		Result
1	Tan Sian Peng	1 – 2 (11–15, 15–2, 13–15)	Stuart Brehaut
2	Zhao Jianhua	2 – 1 (9–15, 15–8, 15–12)	Murray Hocking
3	Faris Mawardi	2 – 1 (15–9, 5–15, 15–11)	Craig Booley
4	Patrick Lau; Zhao Jianhua	2 – 1 (7–15, 15–2, 15–4)	David Bamford; Peter Blackburn
5	Faris Mawardi; Tan Sian Peng	– Walkover	Murray Hocking; Mark Nichols

Philippines
5
PhilSports Arena
15 February 1998

Iran
0

		Result
1	Melvin Llanes	2 – 0	Bahador Zakizadeh
2	Jaime Llanes	2 – 1	Morteza Validarvi
3	Kennevic Asuncion	2 – 0	Afshin Bozorgzadeh
4	Melvin Llanes; Ian Piencenaves	2 – 1	Morteza Validarvi; Bahador Zakizadeh
5	Arolas Amahit Jr. Rhamir Antonio	2 – 0	Afshin Bozorgzadeh; Ali Reza Shafiee

Singapore
4
PhilSports Arena
16 February 1998

Philippines
1

		Result
1	Tan Sian Peng	0 – 2 (14–18, 8–15)	Melvin Llanes
2	Patrick Lau	2 – 0 (18–13, 15–8)	Jaime Llanes
3	Faris Mawardi	2 – 1 (10–15, 15–11, 15–5)	Kennevic Asuncion
4	Patrick Lau; Zhao Jianhua	2 – 0 (15–4, 15–8)	Melvin Llanes; Ian Piencenaves
5	Faris Mawardi; Tan Sian Peng	2 – 0 (15–7, 15–10)	Arolas Amahit Jr. Rhamir Antonio

Australia
3
PhilSports Arena
16 February 1998

Iran
2

		Result
1	Stuart Brehaut	2 – 0	Bahador Zakizadeh
2	Craig Booley	1 – 2	Morteza Validarvi
3	David Bamford	2 – 0	Afshin Bozorgzadeh
4	Peter Blackburn; Stuart Brehaut	1 – 2	Morteza Validarvi; Bahador Zakizadeh
5	David Bamford; Mark Nichols	2 – 0	Afshin Bozorgzadeh; Ali Reza Shafiee

Singapore
5
PhilSports Arena
17 February 1998

Iran
0

		Result
1	Tan Sian Peng	2 – 0 (15–3, 17–14)	Bahador Zakizadeh
2	Patrick Lau	2 – 0 (15–7, 15–4)	Morteza Validarvi
3	Noor Izwan Paini	2 – 1 (7–15, 15–4, 15–6)	Afshin Bozorgzadeh
4	Patrick Lau; Tan Sian Peng	2 – 0 (15–4, 15–5)	Ali Reza Shafiee; Bahador Zakizadeh
5	Faris Mawardi; Tan Sian Peng	2 – 0 (15–6, 15–5)	Afshin Bozorgzadeh; Morteza Validarvi

Australia
3
PhilSports Arena
17 February 1998

Philippines
2

		Result
1	Stuart Brehaut	1 – 2 (15–1, 6–15, 14–17)	Melvin Llanes
2	Murray Hocking	1 – 1 (5–15, 3^{r}–3)	Jaime Llanes
3	Craig Booley	2 – 0 (15–10, 15–4)	Kennevic Asuncion
4	David Bamford; Peter Blackburn	2 – 0 (15–4, 18–15)	Melvin Llanes; Ian Piencenaves
5	Craig Booley; Mark Nichols	2 – 0 (15–11, 15–3)	Arolas Amahit Jr. Rhamir Antonio

==== Group B ====
Pos	Team	Pld	W	L	MF	MA	MD	Pts	Qualification
1	Thailand	3	3	0	12	3	+9	3	Advance to second round
2	India	3	2	1	11	4	+7	2	
3	New Zealand	3	1	2	7	8	−1	1	
4	Mauritius	3	0	3	0	15	−15	0	
5	Nepal	0	0	0	0	0	0	0	Withdrew

Source: International Badminton Federation

Thailand
3
PhilSports Arena
15 February 1998

India
2

		Result
1	Anuphap Theeraratsakul	0 – 2 (8–15, 7–15)	Pullela Gopichand
2	Natapol Sarawan	2 – 0 (17–14, 15–12)	Abhinn Shyam Gupta
3	Kittipon Kittikul	2 – 1 (11–15, 15–13, 15–2)	Sachin Ratti
4	Siripong Siripool; Pramote Teerawiwatana	2 – 0 (15–10, 15–7)	Jaseel P. Ismail; Vijaydeep Singh
5	Kittipon Kittikul; Khunakorn Sudhisodhi	– Walkover	Rajeev Bagga; Vinod Kumar

New Zealand
5
PhilSports Arena
15 February 1998

Mauritius
0

		Result
1	Nick Hall	2 – 0 (15–2, 15–5)	Denis Constantin
2	Geoff Bellingham	2 – 1 (15–6, 3–15, 15–5)	Eddy Clarisse
3	Dean Galt	2 – 0 (15–9, 15–4)	Stephan Beeharry
4	Dean Galt; Daniel Shirley	2 – 0 (15–9, 15–4)	Eddy Clarisse; Denis Constantin
5	Geoff Bellingham; Nick Hall	2 – 1 (15–3, 3–15, 15–3)	Stephan Beeharry; Geenesh Dussain

Thailand
5
PhilSports Arena
16 February 1998

Mauritius
0

		Result
1	Anuphap Theeraratsakul	2 – 0 (15–5, 15–1)	Denis Constantin
2	Krid Chuaynarong	2 – 0 (15–1, 15–1)	Yogesh Mahadnac
3	Natapol Sarawan	2 – 0 (15–7, 15–7)	Stephan Beeharry
4	Siripong Siripool; Pramote Teerawiwatana	2 – 0 (15–3, 15–5)	Eddy Clarisse; Denis Constantin
5	Natapol Sarawan; Khunakorn Sudhisodhi	2 – 0 (15–7, 15–2)	Stephan Beeharry; Geenesh Dussain

India
4
PhilSports Arena
16 February 1998

New Zealand
1

		Result
1	Pullela Gopichand	2 – 1	Nick Hall
2	Abhinn Shyam Gupta	1 – 2	Geoff Bellingham
3	Sachin Ratti	2 – 1	Jarrod King
4	Jaseel P. Ismail; Vijaydeep Singh	2 – 0	Dean Galt; Daniel Shirley
5	Rajeev Bagga; Vinod Kumar	2 – 1	Geoff Bellingham; Nick Hall

Thailand
4
PhilSports Arena
17 February 1998

New Zealand
1

		Result
1	Anuphap Theeraratsakul	2 – 0 (10–15, 15–6, 15–2)	Nick Hall
2	Krid Chuaynarong	0 – 2 (6–15, 10–15)	Geoff Bellingham
3	Natapol Sarawan	2 – 0 (18–15, 15–6)	Jarrod King
4	Siripong Siripool; Khunakorn Sudhisodhi	2 – 0 (15–10, 15–4)	Geoff Bellingham; Nick Hall
5	Natapol Sarawan; Pramote Teerawiwatana	2 – 0 (15–13, 15–10)	Dean Galt; Daniel Shirley

India
5
PhilSports Arena
17 February 1998

Mauritius
0

		Result
1	Pullela Gopichand	2 – 0 (15–3, 15–9)	Denis Constantin
2	Nikhil Kanetkar	2 – 0 (15–4, 15–4)	Yogesh Mahadnac
3	Sachin Ratti	2 – 0 (15–10, 15–5)	Eddy Clarisse
4	Rajeev Bagga; Vinod Kumar	2 – 1 (0–15, 15–10, 15–1)	Stephan Beeharry; Geenesh Dussain
5	Jaseel P. Ismail; Vijaydeep Singh	2 – 0 (15–8, 15–4)	Denis Constantin; Yogesh Mahadnac

==== Group C ====
Pos	Team	Pld	W	L	MF	MA	MD	Pts	Qualification
1	Canada	4	4	0	17	3	+14	4	Advance to second round
2	Sri Lanka	4	3	1	14	6	+8	3	
3	Myanmar	4	2	2	13	7	+6	2	
4	Pakistan	4	1	3	6	14	−8	1	
5	Macau	4	0	4	0	20	−20	0	

Source: International Badminton Federation

Canada
3
PhilSports Arena
15 February 1998

Myanmar
2

		Result
1	Mike Beres	0 – 2 (10–15, 8–15)	Zaw Win
2	Bobby Milroy	0 – 2 (13–15, 11–15)	Lwin Aung
3	Brian Abra	2 – 0 (15–0, 15–11)	Ni Htay Zar
4	Iain Sydie; Darryl Yung	2 – 0 (15–5, 15–5)	Lwin Aung; Zaw Win
5	Mike Beres; Bryan Moody	2 – 0 (15–2, 15–4)	Bo Bo Zaw Aung; Ni Htay Zar

Pakistan
5
PhilSports Arena
15 February 1998

Macau
0

		Result
1	Wajid Ali Chaudhary	2 – 0 (15–9, 15–12)	Joaquim Lobo
2	Tahir Ishaq	2 – 0 (15–3, 15–2)	Iong Heng Chi
3	Aleem Syed Asadullah	2 – 0 (15–0, 15–0)	Teng Shih Ee
4	Tahir Ishaq; Haroon Kaleem	2 – 0 (15–5, 15–2)	Joaquim Lobo; Leong Chak Kuan
5	Wajid Ali Chaudhary; Omar Zeeshan	2 – 0 (15–6, 15–3)	Leong Pui Lin; Lo Ka Lon

Sri Lanka
5
PhilSports Arena
15 February 1998

Macau
0

		Result
1	Thushara Edirisinghe	2 – 0	Joaquim Lobo
2	Duminda Jayakody	2 – 0	Iong Heng Chi
3	Niroshan Wijekoon	2 – 0	Leong Pui Lin
4	Thushara Edirisinghe; Palinda Halangoda	2 – 0	Joaquim Lobo; Leong Chak Kuan
5	Duminda Jayakody; Niroshan Wijekoon	2 – 0	Leong Pui Lin; Lo Ka Lon

Sri Lanka
5
PhilSports Arena
16 February 1998

Pakistan
0

		Result
1	Thushara Edirisinghe	2 – 1	Wajid Ali Chaudhary
2	Duminda Jayakody	2 – 0	Tahir Ishaq
3	Niroshan Wijekoon	2 – 0	Aleem Syed Asadullah
4	Thushara Edirisinghe; Palinda Halangoda	2 – 0	Tahir Ishaq; Haroon Kaleem
5	Duminda Jayakody; Niroshan Wijekoon	2 – 0	Wajid Ali Chaudhary; Omar Zeeshan

Canada
5
PhilSports Arena
16 February 1998

Macau
0

		Result
1	Mike Beres	2 – 0	Joaquim Lobo
2	Bobby Milroy	2 – 0	Iong Heng Chi
3	Brian Abra	2 – 0	Leong Pui Lin
4	Iain Sydie; Darryl Yung	2 – 0	Joaquim Lobo; Leong Chak Kuan
5	Mike Beres; Bryan Moody	2 – 0	Leong Pui Lin; Lo Ka Lon

Canada
5
PhilSports Arena
16 February 1998

Pakistan
0

		Result
1	Mike Beres	2 – 0 (15–1, 15–4)	Wajid Ali Chaudhary
2	Bobby Milroy	2 – 0 (15–10, 15–9)	Tahir Ishaq
3	Brian Abra	2 – 0 (15–10, 15–11)	Omar Zeeshan
4	Iain Sydie; Darryl Yung	2 – 0 (15–3, 15–4)	Tahir Ishaq; Haroon Kaleem
5	Mike Beres; Bryan Moody	2 – 0 (15–4, 15–2)	Aleem Syed Asadullah; Omar Zeeshan

Sri Lanka
3
PhilSports Arena
16 February 1998

Myanmar
2

		Result
1	Thushara Edirisinghe	1 – 2	Zaw Win
2	Duminda Jayakody	1 – 2	Lwin Aung
3	Niroshan Wijekoon	2 – 0	Ni Htay Zar
4	Thushara Edirisinghe; Palinda Halangoda	2 – 0	Lwin Aung; Zaw Win
5	Duminda Jayakody; Niroshan Wijekoon	2 – 0	Bo Bo Zaw Aung; Ni Htay Zar

Pakistan
1
PhilSports Arena
17 February 1998

Myanmar
4

		Result
1	Wajid Ali Chaudhary	1 – 2	Zaw Win
2	Tahir Ishaq	1 – 2	Lwin Aung
3	Aleem Syed Asadullah	1 – 2	Ni Htay Zar
4	Tahir Ishaq; Haroon Kaleem	0 – 2	Lwin Aung; Zaw Win
5	Wajid Ali Chaudhary; Omar Zeeshan	2 – 0	Bo Bo Zaw Aung; Ni Htay Zar

Canada
4
PhilSports Arena
17 February 1998

Sri Lanka
1

		Result
1	Mike Beres	2 – 1	Thushara Edirisinghe
2	Bobby Milroy	2 – 1	Duminda Jayakody
3	Brian Abra	1 – 2	Niroshan Wijekoon
4	Iain Sydie; Darryl Yung	2 – 0	Thushara Edirisinghe; Palinda Halangoda
5	Mike Beres; Bryan Moody	2 – 0	Duminda Jayakody; Niroshan Wijekoon

Myanmar
5
PhilSports Arena
17 February 1998

Macau
0

		Result
1	Zaw Win	2 – 0 (15–1, 15–2)	Joaquim Lobo
2	Lwin Aung	2 – 0 (15–3, 15–3)	Iong Heng Chi
3	Ni Htay Zar	2 – 0 (15–3, 15–3)	Leong Pui Lin
4	Lwin Aung; Zaw Win	2 – 0 (15–1, 15–5)	Joaquim Lobo; Leong Chak Kuan
5	Bo Bo Zaw Aung; Ni Htay Zar	2 – 0 (15–5, 15–6)	Leong Pui Lin; Lo Ka Lon

=== Second round ===
==== Group X ====
Pos	Team	Pld	W	L	MF	MA	MD	Pts	Qualification
1	China	3	3	0	14	1	+13	3	Advance to knockout stage
2	South Korea	3	2	1	9	6	+3	2	Advance to knockout stage
3	Chinese Taipei	3	1	2	7	8	−1	1	
4	Canada	3	0	3	0	15	−15	0	

Source: International Badminton Federation

China
5
PhilSports Arena
18 February 1998

Chinese Taipei
0

		Result
1	Sun Jun	2 – 0	Liu En-hung
2	Dong Jiong	2 – 0	Lee Mou-chou
3	Luo Yigang	2 – 0	Chien Yu-hsiu
4	Liu Yong; Zhang Wei	2 – 0	Chien Yu-hsiu; Horng Shin-jeng
5	Yang Ming; Zhang Jun	2 – 0	Lee Sung-yuan; Lee Wei-jen

South Korea
5
PhilSports Arena
18 February 1998

Canada
0

		Result
1	Hwang Sun-ho	2 – 0 (15–13, 15–4)	Mike Beres
2	Jang Chun-woong	2 – 1 (16–17, 15–6, 15–8)	Bobby Milroy
3	Ahn Jae-chang	2 – 0 (15–5, 15–2)	Brian Abra
4	Ha Tae-kwon; Lee Dong-soo	2 – 0 (15–5, 15–4)	Iain Sydie; Darryl Yung
5	Kim Dong-moon; Yim Bang-eun	2 – 0 (15–2, 15–7)	Mike Beres; Bryan Moody

China
5
PhilSports Arena
19 February 1998

Canada
0

		Result
1	Sun Jun	2 – 0	Mike Beres
2	Luo Yigang	2 – 0	Bobby Milroy
3	Chen Gang	2 – 0	Brian Abra
4	Liu Yong; Zhang Wei	2 – 0	Iain Sydie; Darryl Yung
5	Yang Ming; Zhang Jun	2 – 0	Mike Beres; Brian Moody

South Korea
3
PhilSports Arena
19 February 1998

Chinese Taipei
2

		Result
1	Hwang Sun-ho	1 – 2	Liu En-hung
2	Jang Chun-woong	1 – 2	Lee Mou-chou
3	Ahn Jae-chang	2 – 0	Chien Yu-hsiu
4	Lee Dong-soo; Yoo Yong-sung	2 – 0	Chien Yu-hsiu; Horng Shin-jeng
5	Ha Tae-kwon; Kim Dong-moon	2 – 0	Lee Sung-yuan; Lee Wei-jen

China
4
PhilSports Arena
20 February 1998

South Korea
1

		Result
1	Sun Jun	2 – 0 (15–10, 15–0)	Hwang Sun-ho
2	Dong Jiong	2 – 1 (15–6, 15–1)	Jang Chun-woong
3	Luo Yigang	2 – 0 (15–12, 15–4)	Jun Jong-bae
4	Liu Yong; Zhang Wei	0 – 2 (12–15, 12–15)	Ha Tae-kwon; Lee Dong-soo
5	Yang Ming; Zhang Jun	2 – 0 (15–7, 15–9)	Kim Dong-moon; Yim Bang-eun

Chinese Taipei
5
PhilSports Arena
20 February 1998

Canada
0

		Result
1	Liu En-hung	2 – 0 (15–3, 15–11)	Mike Beres
2	Lee Mou-chou	2 – 0 (15–8, 15–5)	Bobby Milroy
3	Chien Yu-hsiu	1 – 2 (15–0, 15–0)	Brian Moody
4	Chien Yu-hsiu; Horng Shin-jeng	2 – 1 (15–6, 15–11)	Bobby Milroy; Darryl Yung
5	Lee Sung-yuan; Lee Wei-jen	2 – 0 (15–9, 15–10)	Mike Beres; Brian Moody

==== Group Y ====
Pos	Team	Pld	W	L	MF	MA	MD	Pts	Qualification
1	Malaysia	3	3	0	14	1	+13	3	Advance to knockout stage
2	Japan	3	2	1	7	8	−1	2	Advance to knockout stage
3	Thailand	3	1	2	6	9	−3	1	
4	Singapore	3	0	3	3	12	−9	0	

Source: International Badminton Federation

Malaysia
5
PhilSports Arena
18 February 1998

Thailand
0

		Result
1	Ong Ewe Hock	2 – 0	Anuphap Theeraratsakul
2	Rashid Sidek	2 – 0	Krid Chuaynarong
3	Roslin Hashim	2 – 0	Natapol Sarawan
4	Cheah Soon Kit; Yap Kim Hock	2 – 0	Siripong Siripool; Pramote Teerawiwatana
5	Choong Tan Fook; Lee Wan Wah	2 – 0	Natapol Sarawan; Khunakorn Sudhisodhi

Japan
3
PhilSports Arena
18 February 1998

Singapore
2

		Result
1	Keita Masuda	2 – 1 (13–18, 15–4, 15–4)	Patrick Lau
2	Shinji Ōta	0 – 2 (5–15, 9–15)	Zhao Jianhua
3	Fumihiko Machida	2 – 0 (15–3, 15–5)	Faris Mawardi
4	Yuzo Kubota; Shinji Ōta	1 – 2 (10–15, 15–12, 12–15)	Patrick Lau; Zhao Jianhua
5	Tadashi Ōtsuka; Seiichi Watanabe	2 – 0 (15–7, 8–15, 15–9)	Faris Mawardi; Tan Sian Peng

Malaysia
5
PhilSports Arena
19 February 1998

Singapore
0

		Result
1	Yong Hock Kin	2 – 0 (15–1, 15–3)	Tan Sian Peng
2	Rashid Sidek	2 – 0 (15–1, 15–0)	Toh Wee Kai
3	Roslin Hashim	2 – 0 (15–0, 15–1)	Noor Izwan Paini
4	Cheah Soon Kit; Yap Kim Hock	2 – 0 (15–3, 15–2)	Kevin Lim; Tan Sian Peng
5	Rosman Razak; Tan Kim Her	2 – 0 (15–9, 15–0)	Patrick Lau; Faris Mawardi

Japan
2
PhilSports Arena
19 February 1998

Thailand
3

		Result
1	Keita Masuda	1 – 2	Anuphap Theeraratsakul
2	Shinji Ōta	2 – 1	Krid Chuaynarong
3	Fumihiko Machida	2 – 0	Natapol Sarawan
4	Yuzo Kubota; Shinji Ōta	0 – 2	Siripong Siripool; Pramote Teerawiwatana
5	Tadashi Ōtsuka; Seiichi Watanabe	2 – 0	Natapol Sarawan; Khunakorn Sudhisodhi

Malaysia
5
PhilSports Arena
20 February 1998

Japan
0

		Result
1	Ong Ewe Hock	2 – 0 (15–2, 15–5)	Keita Masuda
2	Rashid Sidek	2 – 0 (15–7, 15–7)	Fumihiko Machida
3	Roslin Hashim	2 – 0 (15–10, 15–6)	Yuzo Kubota
4	Rosman Razak; Tan Kim Her	2 – 0 (15–7, 15–11)	Fumihiko Machida; Keita Masuda
5	Chan Chong Ming; Jeremy Gan	2 – 0 (15–11, 15–9)	Tadashi Ōtsuka; Seiichi Watanabe

Thailand
4
PhilSports Arena
20 February 1998

Singapore
1

		Result
1	Anuphap Theeraratsakul	2 – 0 (15–10, 15–3)	Tan Sian Peng
2	Krid Chuaynarong	1 – 2 (6–15, 15–8, 8–15)	Patrick Lau
3	Natapol Sarawan	2 – 0 (17–14, 15–12)	Faris Mawardi
4	Siripong Siripool; Pramote Teerawiwatana	2 – 0 (15–5, 15–8)	Patrick Lau; Zhao Jianhua
5	Krid Chuaynarong; Khunakorn Sudhisodhi	2 – 0 (15–4, 15–5)	Kevin Lim; Faris Mawardi

=== Knockout stage ===
Semi-finals
China	5
Japan	0
South Korea	0
Malaysia	5

Final
China	4
Malaysia	1
Third place
Japan	0
South Korea	5

==== Semi-finals ====
China
5
PhilSports Arena
21 February 1998

Japan
0

		Result
1	Sun Jun	2 – 0 (15–4, 15–4)	Keita Masuda
2	Luo Yigang	2 – 0 (15–9, 15–2)	Fumihiko Machida
3	Chen Gang	2 – 0 (15–1, 17–14)	Yuzo Kubota
4	Liu Yong; Zhang Wei	2 – 0 (15–6, 15–5)	Keita Masuda; Shinji Ōta
5	Ge Cheng; Tao Xiaoqiang	2 – 0 (15–4, 15–1)	Tadashi Ōtsuka; Seiichi Watanabe

Malaysia
5
PhilSports Arena
21 February 1998

South Korea
0

		Result
1	Ong Ewe Hock	2 – 0 (15–5, 15–5)	Jang Chun-woong
2	Yong Hock Kin	2 – 0 (15–3, 15–1)	Yim Bang-eun
3	Rashid Sidek	2 – 0 (15–5, 15–2)	Jun Jong-bae
4	Cheah Soon Kit; Yap Kim Hock	2 – 0 (15–8, 15–5)	Hwang Sun-ho; Yoo Yong-sung
5	Rosman Razak; Tan Kim Her	0 – 2 (15–9, 15–1)	Jun Jong-bae; Yim Bang-eun

==== Third place ====
South Korea
5
PhilSports Arena
22 February 1998

Japan
0

		Result
1	Hwang Sun-ho	2 – 0	Keita Masuda
2	Jang Chun-woong	2 – 1	Shinji Ōta
3	Ahn Jae-chang	2 – 1	Fumihiko Machida
4	Lee Dong-soo; Yoo Yong-sung	2 – 0	Yuzo Kubota; Shinji Ōta
5	Ha Tae-kwon; Kim Dong-moon	2 – 0	Tadashi Ōtsuka; Seiichi Watanabe

==== Final ====
China
4
PhilSports Arena
22 February 1998

Malaysia
1

		Result
1	Sun Jun	2 – 0 (15–5, 15–7)	Ong Ewe Hock
2	Dong Jiong	1 – 2 (12–15, 15–9, 7–15)	Yong Hock Kin
3	Luo Yigang	2 – 0 (15–5, 15–1)	Roslin Hashim
4	Liu Yong; Zhang Wei	2 – 0 (15–11, 15–12)	Rosman Razak; Tan Kim Her
5	Yang Ming; Zhang Jun	2 – 0 (15–12, 15–2)	Chan Chong Ming; Jeremy Gan

== European Zone ==
The European qualifying rounds were held in the Slagenhallen for first round matches and in the Jotunhallen starting from the second round in Sandefjord, Norway.

=== First round ===
==== Group A ====
Pos	Team	Pld	W	L	MF	MA	MD	Pts	Qualification
1	Portugal	4	4	0	20	0	+20	4	Advance to second round
2	Italy	4	3	1	14	6	+8	3	
3	Kazakhstan	4	2	2	10	10	0	2	
4	Zambia	4	1	3	5	15	−10	1	
5	Georgia	4	0	4	1	19	−18	0	

Source: International Badminton Federation

Portugal
5
Slagenhallen
14 February 1998

Zambia
0

		Result
1	Fernando Silva	2 – 0	Mubanga Kaite
2	Marco Vasconcelos	2 – 0	Stanley Mwangulu
3	Ricardo Fernandes	2 – 0	Juma Muwowo
4	Hugo Rodrigues; Fernando Silva	2 – 0	Mubanga Kaite; Stanley Mwangulu
5	Ricardo Fernandes; Marco Vasconcelos	2 – 0	Lucio Mambwe; Juma Muwowo

Italy
5
Slagenhallen
14 February 1998

Georgia
0

		Result
1	Ying Liyong	2 – 0	Malkhaz Mjavia
2	Klaus Raffeiner	2 – 0	Tevan Donadze
3	Gianmarco La Rosa	2 – 0	Mamuka Sarjevadze
4	Klaus Raffeiner; Alexander Theiner	2 – 0	Tevan Donadze; Malkhaz Mjavia
5	Gianmarco La Rosa; Simone Vincenzi	2 – 0	Mamuka Sarjevadze; Vadim Sarkisyan

Kazakhstan
5
Slagenhallen
14 February 1998

Georgia
0

		Result
1	Maxim Kruglik	2 – 0	Malkhaz Mjavia
2	Anuar Musafirov	2 – 0	Tevan Donadze
3	Igor Dmitriev	2 – 0	Mamuka Sarjevadze
4	Igor Dmitriev; Maxim Kruglik	2 – 0	Tevan Donadze; Malkhaz Mjavia
5	Barzhas Akhmetbekov; Anuar Musafirov	2 – 0	Mamuka Sarjevadze; Vadim Sarkisyan

Portugal
5
Slagenhallen
15 February 1998

Georgia
0

		Result
1	Fernando Silva	2 – 0	Malkhaz Mjavia
2	Marco Vasconcelos	2 – 0	Tevan Donadze
3	Ricardo Fernandes	2 – 0	Mamuka Sarjevadze
4	Hugo Rodrigues; Fernando Silva	2 – 0	Tevan Donadze; Malkhaz Mjavia
5	Ricardo Fernandes; Marco Vasconcelos	2 – 0	Mamuka Sarjevadze; Vadim Sarkisyan

Kazakhstan
4
Slagenhallen
15 February 1998

Zambia
1

		Result
1	Maxim Kruglik	2 – 0	Mubanga Kaite
2	Anuar Musafirov	2 – 1	Stanley Mwangulu
3	Barzhas Akhmetbekov	2 – 1	Juma Muwowo
4	Igor Dmitriev; Maxim Kruglik	1 – 2	Mubanga Kaite; Stanley Mwangulu
5	Barzhas Akhmetbekov; Anuar Musafirov	2 – 0	Lucio Mambwe; Juma Muwowo

Portugal
5
Slagenhallen
15 February 1998

Kazakhstan
0

		Result
1	Fernando Silva	2 – 0	Maxim Kruglik
2	Marco Vasconcelos	2 – 0	Anuar Musafirov
3	Ricardo Fernandes	2 – 0	Barzhas Akhmetbekov
4	Hugo Rodrigues; Fernando Silva	2 – 0	Igor Dmitriev; Maxim Kruglik
5	Ricardo Fernandes; Marco Vasconcelos	2 – 0	Barzhas Akhmetbekov; Anuar Musafirov

Italy
5
Slagenhallen
15 February 1998

Zambia
0

		Result
1	Ying Liyong	2 – 0	Mubanga Kaite
2	Klaus Raffeiner	2 – 0	Juma Muwowo
3	Gianmarco La Rosa	2 – 0	Lucio Mambwe
4	Klaus Raffeiner; Alexander Theiner	2 – 0	Mubanga Kaite; Stanley Mwangulu
5	Gianmarco La Rosa; Simone Vincenzi	2 – 0	Lucio Mambwe; Juma Muwowo

Italy
4
Slagenhallen
16 February 1998

Kazakhstan
1

		Result
1	Ying Liyong	2 – 0	Maxim Kruglik
2	Klaus Raffeiner	2 – 0	Anuar Musafirov
3	Gianmarco La Rosa	0 – 2	Igor Dmitriev
4	Klaus Raffeiner; Alexander Theiner	2 – 1	Igor Dmitriev; Maxim Kruglik
5	Gianmarco La Rosa; Simone Vincenzi	2 – 0	Barzhas Akhmetbekov; Anuar Musafirov

Portugal
5
Slagenhallen
16 February 1998

Italy
0

		Result
1	Fernando Silva	2 – 0	Ying Liyong
2	Marco Vasconcelos	2 – 0	Klaus Raffeiner
3	Ricardo Fernandes	2 – 0	Gianmarco La Rosa
4	Hugo Rodrigues; Fernando Silva	2 – 0	Klaus Raffeiner; Alexander Theiner
5	Ricardo Fernandes; Marco Vasconcelos	2 – 0	Gianmarco La Rosa; Simone Vincenzi

Zambia
4
Slagenhallen
16 February 1998

Georgia
1

		Result
1	Mubanga Kaite	2 – 0	Malkhaz Mjavia
2	Stanley Mwangulu	2 – 0	Tevan Donadze
3	Juma Muwowo	2 – 0	Mamuka Sarjevadze
4	Mubanga Kaite; Lucio Mambwe	1 – 2	Tevan Donadze; Malkhaz Mjavia
5	Juma Muwowo; Stanley Mwangulu	2 – 0	Mamuka Sarjevadze; Vadim Sarkisyan

==== Group B ====
Pos	Team	Pld	W	L	MF	MA	MD	Pts	Qualification
1	Iceland	3	3	0	13	2	+11	3	Advance to second round
2	France	3	2	1	10	5	+5	2	
3	Slovenia	3	1	2	5	10	−5	1	
4	Latvia	3	0	3	0	15	−15	0	
5	Botswana	0	0	0	0	0	0	0	Withdrew

Source: International Badminton Federation

Iceland
5
Slagenhallen
14 February 1998

Latvia
0

		Result
1	Tryggvi Nielsen	2 – 0	Eduards Loze
2	Broddi Kristjánsson	2 – 0	Mārtiņš Kažemaks
3	Sveinn Sölvason	2 – 0	Jānis Zagorskis
4	Árni Þór Hallgrímsson; Broddi Kristjánsson	2 – 0	Mārtiņš Kažemaks; Eduards Loze
5	Njörður Ludvigsson; Tryggvi Nielsen	2 – 0	Uģis Briedis; Jānis Zagorskis

France
5
Slagenhallen
14 February 1998

Slovenia
0

		Result
1	Bertrand Gallet	2 – 1	Andrej Pohar
2	Nabil Lasmari	2 – 0	Simon Hawlina
3	Jean-Frédéric Massias	2 – 0	Aleš Babnik
4	Manuel Dubrulle; Vincent Laigle	2 – 0	Simon Hawlina; Andrej Pohar
5	Bertrand Gallet; Jean-Michel Lefort	2 – 1	Aleš Babnik; Mišo Mattias

Iceland
5
Slagenhallen
15 February 1998

Slovenia
0

		Result
1	Tryggvi Nielsen	2 – 1	Andrej Pohar
2	Broddi Kristjánsson	2 – 0	Simon Hawlina
3	Sveinn Sölvason	2 – 1	Aleš Babnik
4	Árni Þór Hallgrímsson; Broddi Kristjánsson	2 – 0	Simon Hawlina; Andrej Pohar
5	Njörður Ludvigsson; Tryggvi Nielsen	2 – 0	Aleš Babnik; Mišo Mattias

France
5
Slagenhallen
15 February 1998

Latvia
0

		Result
1	Bertrand Gallet	2 – 0	Eduards Loze
2	Nabil Lasmari	2 – 0	Mārtiņš Kažemaks
3	Jean-Frédéric Massias	2 – 0	Jānis Zagorskis
4	Manuel Dubrulle; Vincent Laigle	2 – 0	Mārtiņš Kažemaks; Eduards Loze
5	Bertrand Gallet; Jean-Michel Lefort	2 – 0	Uģis Briedis; Jānis Zagorskis

Iceland
3
Slagenhallen
16 February 1998

France
2

		Result
1	Tryggvi Nielsen	2 – 0 (15–11, 15–12)	Bertrand Gallet
2	Broddi Kristjánsson	1 – 2 (11–15, 15–11, 9–15)	Nabil Lasmari
3	Sveinn Sölvason	0 – 2 (3–15, 13–15)	Jean-Frédéric Massias
4	Árni Þór Hallgrímsson; Broddi Kristjánsson	2 – 1 (15–7, 9–15, 15–9)	Manuel Dubrulle; Vincent Laigle
5	Njörður Ludvigsson; Tryggvi Nielsen	2 – 1 (15–13, 10–15, 15–3)	Bertrand Gallet; Jean-Michel Lefort

Slovenia
5
Slagenhallen
16 February 1998

Latvia
0

		Result
1	Andrej Pohar	2 – 0	Eduards Loze
2	Simon Hawlina	2 – 0	Mārtiņš Kažemaks
3	Aleš Babnik	2 – 0	Jānis Zagorskis
4	Simon Hawlina; Andrej Pohar	2 – 0	Mārtiņš Kažemaks; Eduards Loze
5	Aleš Babnik; Mišo Mattias	2 – 0	Uģis Briedis; Jānis Zagorskis

==== Group C ====
Pos	Team	Pld	W	L	MF	MA	MD	Pts	Qualification
1	Poland	4	4	0	19	1	+18	4	Advance to second round
2	South Africa	4	3	1	14	6	+8	3	
3	Israel	4	2	2	11	9	+2	2	
4	Armenia	4	1	3	6	14	−8	1	
5	Azerbaijan	4	0	4	0	20	−20	0	

Source: International Badminton Federation

South Africa
4
Slagenhallen
14 February 1998

Armenia
1

		Result
1	Johan Kleingeld	2 – 0	Hayk Misakyan
2	Warren Parsons	2 – 0	Armen Arakelyan
3	Gavin Polmans	1 – 2	Arsen Khachatryan
4	Johan Kleingeld; Anton Kriel	2 – 0	Armen Arakelyan; Arsen Khachatryan
5	Gavin Polmans; Neale Woodroffe	2 – 0	Hayk Misakyan; Georgi Movsesyan

Poland
5
Slagenhallen
14 February 1998

Azerbaijan
0

		Result
1	Jacek Niedźwiedzki	2 – 0	Vesav Tagizadeh
2	Michał Łogosz	2 – 0	Rasul Mehdea
3	Kamil Turonek	2 – 0	Sarvan Naghiyev
4	Michał Łogosz; Damian Pławecki	2 – 0	Sarvan Naghiyev; Vesav Tagizadeh
5	Jacek Niedźwiedzki; Kamil Turonek	2 – 0	Rasul Mehdea; Javid Sadeghov

Israel
4
Slagenhallen
14 February 1998

Armenia
1

		Result
1	Paz Ben-Sira	2 – 0	Hayk Misakyan
2	Leon Pougatch	2 – 0	Armen Arakelyan
3	Yoni Azran	2 – 1	Arsen Khachatryan
4	Paz Ben-Sira; Danny Schneidman	2 – 0	Armen Arakelyan; Arsen Khachatryan
5	Leon Pougatch; Nir Yusim	2 – 0	Hayk Misakyan; Georgi Movsesyan

Poland
5
Slagenhallen
15 February 1998

Armenia
0

		Result
1	Jacek Niedźwiedzki	2 – 0	Hayk Misakyan
2	Michał Łogosz	2 – 0	Armen Arakelyan
3	Kamil Turonek	2 – 0	Georgi Movsesyan
4	Michał Łogosz; Damian Pławecki	2 – 0	Armen Arakelyan; Arsen Khachatryan
5	Jacek Niedźwiedzki; Kamil Turonek	2 – 0	Hayk Misakyan; Georgi Movsesyan

Israel
5
Slagenhallen
15 February 1998

Azerbaijan
0

		Result
1	Paz Ben-Sira	2 – 0	Vesav Tagizadeh
2	Leon Pougatch	2 – 0	Rasul Mehdea
3	Yoni Azran	2 – 0	Javid Sadeghov
4	Paz Ben-Sira; Danny Schneidman	2 – 0	Sarvan Naghiyev; Vesav Tagizadeh
5	Leon Pougatch; Nir Yusim	2 – 0	Rasul Mehdea; Javid Sadeghov

South Africa
5
Slagenhallen
15 February 1998

Azerbaijan
0

		Result
1	Johan Kleingeld	2 – 0	Vesav Tagizadeh
2	Warren Parsons	2 – 0	Rasul Mehdea
3	Neale Woodroffe	2 – 0	Sarvan Naghiyev
4	Johan Kleingeld; Anton Kriel	2 – 0	Sarvan Naghiyev; Vesav Tagizadeh
5	Gavin Polmans; Neale Woodroffe	2 – 0	Rasul Mehdea; Javid Sadeghov

Poland
5
Slagenhallen
15 February 1998

Israel
0

		Result
1	Jacek Niedźwiedzki	2 – 0	Paz Ben-Sira
2	Michał Łogosz	2 – 0	Leon Pougatch
3	Kamil Turonek	2 – 0	Yoni Azran
4	Michał Łogosz; Damian Pławecki	2 – 0	Paz Ben-Sira; Danny Schneidman
5	Jacek Niedźwiedzki; Kamil Turonek	2 – 0	Leon Pougatch; Nir Yusim

South Africa
4
Slagenhallen
15 February 1998

Israel
1

		Result
1	Johan Kleingeld	2 – 0	Paz Ben-Sira
2	Gavin Polmans	1 – 2	Leon Pougatch
3	Neale Woodroffe	2 – 0	Nir Yusim
4	Johan Kleingeld; Anton Kriel	2 – 0	Paz Ben-Sira; Danny Schneidman
5	Gavin Polmans; Neale Woodroffe	2 – 0	Leon Pougatch; Nir Yusim

Poland
4
Slagenhallen
16 February 1998

South Africa
1

		Result
1	Jacek Niedźwiedzki	2 – 0	Johan Kleingeld
2	Michał Łogosz	2 – 0	Warren Parsons
3	Kamil Turonek	2 – 0	Neale Woodroffe
4	Michał Łogosz; Damian Pławecki	2 – 0	Johan Kleingeld; Anton Kriel
5	Jacek Niedźwiedzki; Kamil Turonek	1 – 2	Gavin Polmans; Neale Woodroffe

Armenia
5
Slagenhallen
16 February 1998

Azerbaijan
0

		Result
1	Hayk Misakyan	2 – 0	Vesav Tagizadeh
2	Armen Arakelyan	2 – 0	Rasul Mehdea
3	Arsen Khachatryan	2 – 0	Sarvan Naghiyev
4	Armen Arakelyan; Hayk Misakyan	2 – 0	Sarvan Naghiyev; Vesav Tagizadeh
5	Arsen Khachatryan; Georgi Movsesyan	2 – 0	Rasul Mehdea; Javid Sadeghov

==== Group D ====
Pos	Team	Pld	W	L	MF	MA	MD	Pts	Qualification
1	United States	3	3	0	14	1	+13	3	Advance to second round
2	Belarus	3	2	1	9	6	+3	2	
3	Peru	3	1	2	7	8	−1	1	
4	Greece	3	0	3	0	15	−15	0	
5	Hungary	0	0	0	0	0	0	0	Withdrew

Source: International Badminton Federation

Belarus
5
Slagenhallen
14 February 1998

Greece
0

		Result
1	Vitaliy Shmakov	2 – 0	Christos Tsartsidis
2	Vyatcheslav Roudnitski	2 – 0	Panagiotis Pakaiser
3	Andrei Malioutin	2 – 0	Pavlos Charalambidis
4	Vyatcheslav Roudnitski; Vitaliy Shmakov	2 – 0	Panagiotis Pakaiser; Christos Tsartsidis
5	Andrei Konakh; Andrei Malioutin	2 – 0	Pavlos Charalambidis; George Galvas

United States
5
Slagenhallen
14 February 1998

Peru
0

		Result
1	Kevin Han	2 – 1	Mario Carulla
2	Ignatius Rusli	2 – 0	José Iturriaga
3	Mark Manha	2 – 1	Guillermo Cox
4	Howard Bach; Mark Manha	2 – 0	Mario Carulla; José Iturriaga
5	Kevin Han; Ignatius Rusli	2 – 0	Gustavo Salazar; Federico Valdez

United States
5
Slagenhallen
15 February 1998

Greece
0

		Result
1	Kevin Han	2 – 0	Christos Tsartsidis
2	Ignatius Rusli	2 – 0	Panagiotis Pakaiser
3	Mark Manha	2 – 0	Pavlos Charalambidis
4	Howard Bach; Mark Manha	2 – 0	Pavlos Charalambidis; Christos Tsartsidis
5	Kevin Han; Ignatius Rusli	2 – 0	Panagiotis Pakaiser; George Galvas

Belarus
5
Slagenhallen
15 February 1998

Peru
0

		Result
1	Vitaliy Shmakov	2 – 1	Mario Carulla
2	Vyatcheslav Roudnitski	1 – 2	José Iturriaga
3	Andrei Malioutin	2 – 1	Guillermo Cox
4	Vyatcheslav Roudnitski; Vitaliy Shmakov	2 – 0	Mario Carulla; José Iturriaga
5	Andrei Konakh; Andrei Malioutin	2 – 0	Guillermo Cox; Gustavo Salazar

Belarus
1
Slagenhallen
16 February 1998

United States
4

		Result
1	Vitaliy Shmakov	1 – 2	Kevin Han
2	Vyatcheslav Roudnitski	1 – 2	Ignatius Rusli
3	Andrei Malioutin	1 – 2	Mark Manha
4	Vyatcheslav Roudnitski; Vitaliy Shmakov	2 – 1	Howard Bach; Mark Manha
5	Andrei Konakh; Andrei Malioutin	1 – 2	Kevin Han; Ignatius Rusli

Peru
5
Slagenhallen
16 February 1998

Greece
0

		Result
1	Mario Carulla	2 – 0	Christos Tsartsidis
2	José Iturriaga	2 – 0	Panagiotis Pakaiser
3	Guillermo Cox	2 – 0	Pavlos Charalambidis
4	Mario Carulla; José Iturriaga	2 – 0	Pavlos Charalambidis; Christos Tsartsidis
5	Guillermo Cox; Gustavo Salazar	2 – 0	Panagiotis Pakaiser; George Galvas

==== Group E ====
Pos	Team	Pld	W	L	MF	MA	MD	Pts	Qualification
1	Finland	3	3	0	14	1	+13	3	Advance to second round
2	Czech Republic	3	2	1	10	5	+5	2	
3	Guatemala	3	1	2	6	9	−3	1	
4	Cyprus	3	0	3	0	15	−15	0	
5	Slovakia	0	0	0	0	0	0	0	Withdrew

Source: International Badminton Federation

Finland
5
Slagenhallen
14 February 1998

Cyprus
0

		Result
1	Ilkka Nyqvist	2 – 0 (15–5, 15–4)	Nicolas Pissis
2	Antti Viitikko	2 – 0 (15–3, 15–6)	Antonis Costas Lazarou
3	Lasse Lindelöf	2 – 0 (15–1, 15–2)	Tasos Zevlaris
4	Ville Kinnunen; Ilkka Nyqvist	2 – 0 (15–1, 15–1)	Antonis Costas Lazarou; Nicolas Pissis
5	Jyri Aalto; Lasse Lindelöf	2 – 0 (15–1, 15–0)	Evangelos Evangelou; Tasos Zevlaris

Czech Republic
4
Slagenhallen
14 February 1998

Guatemala
1

		Result
1	Jan Vondra	1 – 2	Kenneth Erichsen
2	Jan Fröhlich	2 – 0	Christian Erichsen
3	Ondřej Lubas	2 – 0	Pedro Yang
4	Jan Fröhlich; Jan Vondra	2 – 1	Christian Erichsen; Kenneth Erichsen
5	Petr Báša; Zdeněk Musil	2 – 0	Erick Anguiano; Pedro Yang

Finland
5
Slagenhallen
15 February 1998

Guatemala
0

		Result
1	Ilkka Nyqvist	2 – 1 (13–15, 15–6, 15–3)	Kenneth Erichsen
2	Pontus Jäntti	2 – 0 (15–8, 15–5)	Christian Erichsen
3	Lasse Lindelöf	2 – 0 (15–1, 15–5)	Pedro Yang
4	Ville Kinnunen; Ilkka Nyqvist	2 – 0 (15–5, 18–17)	Christian Erichsen; Kenneth Erichsen
5	Jyri Aalto; Antti Viitikko	2 – 0 (15–2, 15–2)	Erick Anguiano; Pedro Yang

Czech Republic
5
Slagenhallen
15 February 1998

Cyprus
0

		Result
1	Jan Vondra	2 – 0	Nicolas Pissis
2	Jan Fröhlich	2 – 0	Antonis Costas Lazarou
3	Ondřej Lubas	2 – 0	Tasos Zevlaris
4	Daniel Gaspar; Petr Báša	2 – 0	Nicolas Pissis; Tasos Zevlaris
5	Tomasz Mendrek; Zdeněk Musil	2 – 0	Evangelos Evangelou; Antonis Costas Lazarou

Finland
4
Slagenhallen
16 February 1998

Czech Republic
1

		Result
1	Pontus Jäntti	2 – 0 (15–4, 15–7)	Jan Vondra
2	Antti Viitikko	2 – 1 (8–15, 15–4, 15–6)	Jan Fröhlich
3	Lasse Lindelöf	2 – 0 (15–3, 15–0)	Ondřej Lubas
4	Ville Kinnunen; Ilkka Nyqvist	2 – 0 (15–4, 15–11)	Daniel Gaspar; Petr Báša
5	Jyri Aalto; Antti Viitikko	1 – 2 (15–9, 16–17, 12–15)	Tomasz Mendrek; Zdeněk Musil

Guatemala
5
Slagenhallen
16 February 1998

Cyprus
0

		Result
1	Kenneth Erichsen	2 – 0	Nicolas Pissis
2	Christian Erichsen	2 – 0	Antonis Costas Lazarou
3	Pedro Yang	2 – 0	Tasos Zevlaris
4	Christian Erichsen; Kenneth Erichsen	2 – 0	Antonis Costas Lazarou; Nicolas Pissis
5	Erick Anguiano; Pedro Yang	2 – 0	Evangelos Evangelou; Tasos Zevlaris

==== Group F ====
Pos	Team	Pld	W	L	MF	MA	MD	Pts	Qualification
1	Norway	3	3	0	15	0	+15	3	Advance to second round
2	Ireland	3	2	1	10	5	+5	2	
3	Estonia	3	1	2	3	12	−9	1	
4	Brazil	3	0	3	2	13	−11	0	

Source: International Badminton Federation

Norway
5
Slagenhallen
14 February 1998

Brazil
0

		Result
1	Hans Sperre Jr.	2 – 0 (15–1, 15–1)	Leandro Santos
2	Børge Larsen	2 – 0 (15–0, 15–1)	Paulo von Scala
3	Jim Ronny Andersen	2 – 0 (15–4, 15–3)	Guilherme Pardo
4	Jim Ronny Andersen; Trond Wåland	2 – 0 (15–6, 15–1)	Guilherme Kumasaka; Paulo von Scala
5	Thomas Andersen; Stian Thorsen	2 – 0 (15–9, 15–7)	Guilherme Pardo; Ricardo Trevelin

Ireland
5
Slagenhallen
14 February 1998

Estonia
0

		Result
1	Bruce Topping	2 – 0 (15–2, 15–3)	Heiki Sorge
2	Donal O'Halloran	2 – 0 (15–2, 15–6)	Erko Karing
3	Mark Topping	2 – 1 (15–1, 12–15, 15–12)	Meelis Maiste
4	Michael O'Meara; Bruce Topping	2 – 0 (15–2, 15–4)	Indrek Küüts; Meelis Maiste
5	Donal O'Halloran; Mark Topping	2 – 1 (15–2, 15–0)	Peeter Munitsõn; Heiki Sorge

Norway
5
Slagenhallen
15 February 1998

Estonia
0

		Result
1	Hans Sperre Jr.	2 – 1 (15–5, 11–15, 15–2)	Heiki Sorge
2	Børge Larsen	2 – 0 (15–1, 15–4)	Erko Karing
3	Kristian Larsen	2 – 1 (15–10, 15–17, 15–9)	Meelis Maiste
4	Thomas Andersen; Stian Thorsen	0 – 2 (15–3, 15–0)	Peeter Munitsõn; Heiki Sorge
5	Jim Ronny Andersen; Trond Wåland	2 – 0 (15–5, 15–3)	Indrek Küüts; Meelis Maiste

Ireland
5
Slagenhallen
15 February 1998

Brazil
0

		Result
1	Bruce Topping	2 – 0 (15–4, 15–4)	Leandro Santos
2	Donal O'Halloran	2 – 0 (15–1, 15–4)	Guilherme Pardo
3	Mark Topping	2 – 0 (15–7, 15–11)	Ricardo Trevelin
4	Bruce Topping; Michael O'Meara	2 – 0 (15–10, 15–4)	Guilherme Kumasaka; Paulo von Scala
5	Donal O'Halloran; Mark Topping	2 – 0 (15–1, 15–4)	Guilherme Pardo; Ricardo Trevelin

Norway
5
Slagenhallen
16 February 1998

Ireland
0

		Result
1	Hans Sperre Jr.	2 – 0 (15–10, 15–8)	Bruce Topping
2	Børge Larsen	2 – 0 (15–6, 15–8)	Donal O'Halloran
3	Jim Ronny Andersen	2 – 0 (15–4, 15–4)	Mark Topping
4	Jim Ronny Andersen; Trond Wåland	2 – 1 (15–10, 16–17, 15–2)	Bruce Topping; Michael O'Meara
5	Thomas Andersen; Hans Sperre Jr.	2 – 1 (15–9, 11–15, 15–13)	Donal O'Halloran; Mark Topping

Estonia
3
Slagenhallen
16 February 1998

Brazil
2

		Result
1	Heiki Sorge	2 – 1	Leandro Santos
2	Erko Karing	2 – 0	Paulo von Scala
3	Meelis Maiste	2 – 0	Guilherme Pardo
4	Peeter Munitsõn; Heiki Sorge	1 – 2	Guilherme Kumasaka; Paulo von Scala
5	Indrek Küüts; Meelis Maiste	1 – 2	Guilherme Pardo; Ricardo Trevelin

==== Group G ====
Pos	Team	Pld	W	L	MF	MA	MD	Pts	Qualification
1	Scotland	3	3	0	12	3	+9	3	Advance to second round
2	Wales	3	2	1	10	5	+5	2	
3	Belgium	3	1	2	8	7	+1	1	
4	Lithuania	3	0	3	0	15	−15	0	

Source: International Badminton Federation

Scotland
5
Slagenhallen
14 February 1998

Lithuania
0

		Result
1	Bruce Flockhart	2 – 0 (15–4, 15–0)	Aivaras Kvedarauskas
2	Craig Robertson	2 – 0 (15–5, 15–6)	Sergej Leonovič
3	Jim Mailer	2 – 0 (15–3, 15–6)	Dainius Mikalauskas
4	Russell Hogg; Kenny Middlemiss	2 – 0 (15–4, 15–1)	Aivaras Kvedarauskas; Sergej Leonovič
5	Alastair Gatt; David Gilmour	2 – 0 (15–0, 15–3)	Gediminas Andrikonis; Dainius Mikalauskas

Wales
3
Slagenhallen
14 February 1998

Belgium
2

		Result
1	Geraint Lewis	0 – 2	Ruud Kuijten
2	John Leung	2 – 0	Wouter Claes
3	Chris Davies	0 – 2	Frédéric Mawet
4	Chris Davies; Matthew Hughes	2 – 1	Patrick Boonen; David Vandewinkel
5	John Leung; Chris Rees	2 – 0	Ruud Kuijten; Frédéric Mawet

Scotland
4
Slagenhallen
15 February 1998

Belgium
1

		Result
1	Bruce Flockhart	2 – 1 (15–3, 8–15, 15–10)	Ruud Kuijten
2	Craig Robertson	2 – 0 (15–6, 15–4)	Wouter Claes
3	Jim Mailer	1 – 2 (5–15, 15–13, 14–17)	Frédéric Mawet
4	Russell Hogg; Kenny Middlemiss	2 – 0 (15–5, 15–4)	Patrick Boonen; David Vandewinkel
5	Alastair Gatt; David Gilmour	2 – 1 (11–15, 15–8, 18–16)	Ruud Kuijten; Frédéric Mawet

Wales
5
Slagenhallen
15 February 1998

Lithuania
0

		Result
1	Geraint Lewis	2 – 0	Aivaras Kvedarauskas
2	John Leung	2 – 0	Sergej Leonovič
3	Chris Davies	2 – 0	Dainius Mikalauskas
4	Chris Davies; Matthew Hughes	2 – 0	Aivaras Kvedarauskas; Sergej Leonovič
5	John Leung; Chris Rees	2 – 0	Gediminas Andrikonis; Dainius Mikalauskas

Scotland
3
Slagenhallen
16 February 1998

Wales
2

		Result
1	Bruce Flockhart	2 – 0 (15–2, 15–4)	Geraint Lewis
2	Craig Robertson	0 – 2 (1–15, 15–17)	John Leung
3	Jim Mailer	2 – 0 (15–9, 15–7)	Chris Davies
4	Russell Hogg; Kenny Middlemiss	2 – 0 (15–7, 15–0)	Chris Davies; Matthew Hughes
5	Alastair Gatt; David Gilmour	1 – 2 (8–15, 15–6, 16–17)	John Leung; Chris Rees

Belgium
5
Slagenhallen
16 February 1998

Lithuania
0

		Result
1	Ruud Kuijten	2 – 0	Aivaras Kvedarauskas
2	Wouter Claes	2 – 0	Sergej Leonovič
3	Frédéric Mawet	2 – 0	Dainius Mikalauskas
4	Patrick Boonen; David Vandewinkel	2 – 0	Aivaras Kvedarauskas; Sergej Leonovič
5	Ruud Kuijten; Frédéric Mawet	2 – 0	Gediminas Andrikonis; Dainius Mikalauskas

==== Group H ====
Pos	Team	Pld	W	L	MF	MA	MD	Pts	Qualification
1	Switzerland	3	3	0	11	4	+7	3	Advance to second round
2	Austria	3	2	1	12	3	+9	2	
3	Spain	3	1	2	7	8	−1	1	
4	Mexico	3	0	3	0	15	−15	0	

Source: International Badminton Federation

Austria
5
Slagenhallen
14 February 1998

Mexico
0

		Result
1	Jürgen Koch	2 – 0	Luis Lopezllera
2	Peter Kreulitsch	2 – 0	Gustavo Mere
3	Heimo Götschl	2 – 0	Luis Suárez
4	Harald Hochgatterer; Harald Koch	2 – 1	Luis Lopezllera; Bernardo Monreal
5	Heimo Götschl; Jürgen Koch	2 – 0	Erick Betancourt; Enrique Pallares

Switzerland
3
Slagenhallen
14 February 1998

Spain
2

		Result
1	Thomas Wapp	2 – 0 (15–10, 15–10)	Arturo Ruiz
2	Morten Bundgaard	2 – 0 (15–5, 15–4)	José Antonio Crespo
3	Rémy Matthey de l'Etang	1 – 2 (1–15, 15–6, 7–15)	Sergio Llopis
4	Pascal Bircher; Thomas Wapp	2 – 1 (15–11, 11–15, 17–16)	Ernesto García; Arturo Ruiz
5	Morten Bundgaard; Rémy Matthey de l'Etang	0 – 2 (11–15, 5–15)	José Antonio Crespo; Sergio Llopis

Austria
5
Slagenhallen
15 February 1998

Spain
0

		Result
1	Jürgen Koch	2 – 0	Arturo Ruiz
2	Peter Kreulitsch	2 – 0	José Antonio Crespo
3	Heimo Götschl	2 – 0	Sergio Llopis
4	Harald Hochgatterer; Harald Koch	2 – 0	Ernesto García; Arturo Ruiz
5	Heimo Götschl; Jürgen Koch	2 – 0	José Antonio Crespo; Sergio Llopis

Switzerland
5
Slagenhallen
15 February 1998

Mexico
0

		Result
1	Morten Bundgaard	2 – 0 (15–7, 15–9)	Luis Lopezllera
2	Rémy Matthey de l'Etang	2 – 0 (15–5, 15–4)	Gustavo Mere
3	Stephan Baeriswyl	2 – 0 (15–0, 15–1)	Luis Suárez
4	Morten Bundgaard; Rémy Matthey de l'Etang	2 – 1 (6–15, 15–5, 15–7)	Luis Lopezllera; Bernardo Monreal
5	Pascal Bircher; Thomas Wapp	2 – 0 (15–2, 15–0)	Erick Betancourt; Enrique Pallares

Austria
2
Slagenhallen
16 February 1998

Switzerland
3

		Result
1	Jürgen Koch	1 – 2 (17–15, 9–15, 9–15)	Thomas Wapp
2	Peter Kreulitsch	2 – 1 (18–13, 10–15, 15–10)	Morten Bundgaard
3	Heimo Götschl	2 – 0 (15–12, 15–9)	Rémy Matthey de l'Etang
4	Harald Hochgatterer; Harald Koch	0 – 2 (17–18, 7–15)	Morten Bundgaard; Rémy Matthey de l'Etang
5	Heimo Götschl; Jürgen Koch	1 – 2 (15–3, 4–15, 13–18)	Pascal Bircher; Thomas Wapp

Spain
5
Slagenhallen
16 February 1998

Mexico
0

		Result
1	Luis Lopezllera	2 – 0	Luis Lopezllera
2	José Antonio Crespo	2 – 0	Gustavo Mere
3	Sergio Llopis	2 – 0	Luis Suárez
4	Ernesto García; Arturo Ruiz	2 – 1	Luis Lopezllera; Bernardo Monreal
5	José Antonio Crespo; Sergio Llopis	2 – 0	Erick Betancourt; Enrique Pallares

=== Second round ===
==== Group W ====
Pos	Team	Pld	W	L	MF	MA	MD	Pts	Qualification
1	Denmark	3	3	0	14	1	+13	3	Advance to knockout stage
2	Russia	3	1	2	7	8	−1	1	
3	Scotland	3	1	2	6	9	−3	1	
4	Norway	3	1	2	5	10	−5	1	

Source: International Badminton Federation

Denmark
5
Jotunhallen
17 February 1998

Norway
0

		Result
1	Peter Gade	2 – 0 (15–8, 15–5)	Hans Sperre Jr.
2	Poul-Erik Høyer Larsen	2 – 0 (15–9, 15–9)	Børge Larsen
3	Martin Lundgaard Hansen	2 – 1 (9–15, 15–12, 15–8)	Jim Ronny Andersen
4	Jens Eriksen; Jesper Larsen	2 – 1 (15–3, 9–15, 15–12)	Jim Ronny Andersen; Trond Wåland
5	Martin Lundgaard Hansen; Michael Søgaard	2 – 0 (15–3, 15–10)	Thomas Andersen; Stian Thorsen

Russia
3
Jotunhallen
17 February 1998

Scotland
2

		Result
1	Stanislav Pukhov	1 – 2 (7–15, 15–9, 11–15)	Bruce Flockhart
2	Artur Khachaturyan	2 – 0 (17–16, 15–11)	Jim Mailer
3	Andrey Antropov	2 – 0 (15–11, 15–9)	David Gilmour
4	Andrey Antropov; Nikolai Zuyev	2 – 0 (15–6, 15–7)	Russell Hogg; Kenny Middlemiss
5	Artur Khachaturyan; Sergey Melnikov	0 – 2 (15–18, 8–15)	Alastair Gatt; Craig Robertson

Denmark
4
Jotunhallen
18 February 1998

Scotland
1

		Result
1	Peter Gade	2 – 0 (15–9, 15–0)	Bruce Flockhart
2	Poul-Erik Høyer Larsen	2 – 0 (15–7, 15–2)	Jim Mailer
3	Kenneth Jonassen	2 – 0 (15–6, 15–6)	David Gilmour
4	Jens Eriksen; Jesper Larsen	1 – 2 (15–8, 11–15, 15–17)	Russell Hogg; Kenny Middlemiss
5	Martin Lundgaard Hansen; Michael Søgaard	2 – 0 (15–8, 15–5)	Alastair Gatt; Craig Robertson

Russia
2
Jotunhallen
18 February 1998

Norway
3

		Result
1	Stanislav Pukhov	0 – 2 (3–15, 14–17)	Hans Sperre Jr.
2	Artur Khachaturyan	0 – 2 (5–15, 8–15)	Børge Larsen
3	Sergey Melnikov	0 – 2 (13–18, 10–15)	Jim Ronny Andersen
4	Andrey Antropov; Nikolai Zuyev	2 – 0 (15–10, 15–7)	Jim Ronny Andersen; Trond Wåland
5	Artur Khachaturyan; Sergey Melnikov	2 – 0 (15–7, 15–12)	Thomas Andersen; Stian Thorsen

Denmark
5
Jotunhallen
19 February 1998

Russia
0

		Result
1	Peter Gade	2 – 0 (15–2, 15–1)	Stanislav Pukhov
2	Poul-Erik Høyer Larsen	2 – 0 (15–0, 15–11)	Artur Khachaturyan
3	Kenneth Jonassen	2 – 0 (15–3, 15–1)	Andrey Antropov
4	Jens Eriksen; Jesper Larsen	2 – 0 (15–13, 15–2)	Artur Khachaturyan; Sergey Melnikov
5	Jon Holst-Christensen; Michael Søgaard	2 – 0 (15–9, 15–7)	Andrey Antropov; Nikolai Zuyev

Scotland
3
Jotunhallen
19 February 1998

Norway
2

		Result
1	Bruce Flockhart	2 – 0 (15–10, 15–11)	Hans Sperre Jr.
2	Jim Mailer	1 – 2 (15–5, 8–15, 0–15)	Børge Larsen
3	David Gilmour	0 – 2 (7–15, 5–15)	Jim Ronny Andersen
4	Russell Hogg; Kenny Middlemiss	2 – 0 (15–8, 15–4)	Jim Ronny Andersen; Trond Wåland
5	Alastair Gatt; Craig Robertson	2 – 0 (15–8, 15–8)	Thomas Andersen; Stian Thorsen

==== Group X ====
Pos	Team	Pld	W	L	MF	MA	MD	Pts	Qualification
1	England	3	3	0	13	2	+11	3	Advance to knockout stage
2	Germany	3	2	1	9	6	+3	2	
3	Finland	3	1	2	6	9	−3	1	
4	Switzerland	3	0	3	2	13	−11	0	

Source: International Badminton Federation

England
4
Jotunhallen
17 February 1998

Finland
1

		Result
1	Darren Hall	2 – 1 (5–15, 15–9, 15–5)	Pontus Jäntti
2	Colin Haughton	2 – 0 (15–9, 15–12)	Ilkka Nyqvist
3	Mark Constable	1 – 2 (15–9, 10–15, 2–15)	Lasse Lindelöf
4	Simon Archer; Chris Hunt	2 – 0 (15–10, 15–8)	Ville Kinnunen; Antti Viitikko
5	Julian Robertson; Nathan Robertson	2 – 0 (18–13, 18–15)	Jyri Aalto; Ilkka Nyqvist

Germany
4
Jotunhallen
17 February 1998

Switzerland
1

		Result
1	Oliver Pongratz	1 – 2 (11–15, 15–7, 11–15)	Thomas Wapp
2	Conrad Hückstädt	2 – 1 (17–14, 1–15, 15–7)	Morten Bundgaard
3	Marek Bujak	2 – 0 (15–1, 15–0)	Stephan Baeriswyl
4	Michael Helber; Björn Siegemund	2 – 0 (15–11, 15–5)	Morten Bundgaard; Rémy Matthey de l'Etang
5	Michael Keck; Christian Mohr	2 – 0 (15–13, 15–6)	Pascal Bircher; Thomas Wapp

England
5
Jotunhallen
18 February 1998

Switzerland
0

		Result
1	Darren Hall	2 – 0 (15–3, 15–2)	Thomas Wapp
2	Colin Haughton	2 – 0 (15–5, 15–11)	Rémy Matthey de l'Etang
3	Peter Bush	2 – 0 (15–6, 15–2)	Stephan Baeriswyl
4	Simon Archer; Chris Hunt	2 – 0 (15–5, 15–8)	Morten Bundgaard; Rémy Matthey de l'Etang
5	Ian Pearson; John Quinn	2 – 0 (15–1, 15–3)	Pascal Bircher; Thomas Wapp

Germany
4
Jotunhallen
18 February 1998

Finland
1

		Result
1	Conrad Hückstädt	1 – 2 (10–15, 15–1, 7–15)	Antti Viitikko
2	Oliver Pongratz	2 – 1 (10–15, 15–5, 15–9)	Pontus Jäntti
3	Marek Bujak	2 – 0 (18–16, 15–2)	Lasse Lindelöf
4	Michael Helber; Björn Siegemund	2 – 0 (15–3, 15–4)	Ville Kinnunen; Ilkka Nyqvist
5	Michael Keck; Christian Mohr	2 – 0 (15–11, 15–5)	Jyri Aalto; Lasse Lindelöf

England
4
Jotunhallen
19 February 1998

Germany
1

		Result
1	Darren Hall	2 – 0	Oliver Pongratz
2	Colin Haughton	2 – 1	Conrad Hückstädt
3	Peter Bush	1 – 2	Marek Bujak
4	Simon Archer; Chris Hunt	2 – 0	Michael Helber; Björn Siegemund
5	Ian Pearson; John Quinn	2 – 0	Michael Keck; Christian Mohr

Finland
4
Jotunhallen
19 February 1998

Switzerland
1

		Result
1	Pontus Jäntti	2 – 0 (15–0, 15–11)	Thomas Wapp
2	Ilkka Nyqvist	0 – 2 (13–15, 9–15)	Morten Bundgaard
3	Antti Viitikko	2 – 0 (18–15, 15–4)	Rémy Matthey de l'Etang
4	Ville Kinnunen; Ilkka Nyqvist	2 – 0 (15–6, 15–6)	Morten Bundgaard; Rémy Matthey de l'Etang
5	Jyri Aalto; Lasse Lindelöf	2 – 0 (15–3, 15–4)	Pascal Bircher; Thomas Wapp

==== Group Y ====
Pos	Team	Pld	W	L	MF	MA	MD	Pts	Qualification
1	Netherlands	3	3	0	11	4	+7	3	Advance to knockout stage
2	Ukraine	3	2	1	10	5	+5	2	
3	Portugal	3	1	2	6	9	−3	1	
4	Iceland	3	0	3	3	12	−9	0	

Source: International Badminton Federation

Netherlands
4
Jotunhallen
17 February 1998

Portugal
1

		Result
1	Jeroen van Dijk	2 – 1 (18–16, 9–15, 15–10)	Fernando Silva
2	Dicky Palyama	2 – 0 (15–9, 18–14)	Marco Vasconcelos
3	Gerben Bruijstens	2 – 0 (15–9, 15–6)	Ricardo Fernandes
4	Dennis Lens; Quinten van Dalm	2 – 0 (15–9, 15–10)	Hugo Rodrigues; Fernando Silva
5	Norbert van Barneveld; Jurgen van Leeuwen	1 – 2 (15–5, 3–15, 10–15)	Ricardo Fernandes; Marco Vasconcelos

Ukraine
5
Jotunhallen
17 February 1998

Iceland
0

		Result
1	Konstantin Tatranov	2 – 0	Tryggvi Nielsen
2	Vladislav Druzchenko	2 – 0	Broddi Kristjánsson
3	Dmitry Miznikov	2 – 0	Sveinn Sölvason
4	Vladislav Druzchenko; Mykhailo Mizin	2 – 0	Árni Þór Hallgrímsson; Broddi Kristjánsson
5	Dmitry Miznikov; Konstantin Tatranov	2 – 0	Njörður Ludvigsson; Tryggvi Nielsen

Netherlands
4
Jotunhallen
18 February 1998

Iceland
1

		Result
1	Jeroen van Dijk	2 – 0 (15–7, 15–10)	Tryggvi Nielsen
2	Dicky Palyama	2 – 0 (15–6, 15–8)	Sveinn Sölvason
3	Gerben Bruijstens	2 – 0 (15–11, 15–0)	Guðmundur Adolfsson
4	Dennis Lens; Quinten van Dalm	0 – 2 (15–6, 15–5)	Árni Þór Hallgrímsson; Broddi Kristjánsson
5	Norbert van Barneveld; Jurgen van Leeuwen	1 – 2 (15–11, 15–17, 10–15)	Njörður Ludvigsson; Tryggvi Nielsen

Ukraine
3
Jotunhallen
18 February 1998

Portugal
2

		Result
1	Konstantin Tatranov	1 – 2	Fernando Silva
2	Vladislav Druzchenko	2 – 1	Marco Vasconcelos
3	Dmitry Miznikov	2 – 1	Ricardo Fernandes
4	Vladislav Druzchenko; Mykhailo Mizin	2 – 1	Hugo Rodrigues; Fernando Silva
5	Dmitry Miznikov; Konstantin Tatranov	1 – 2	Ricardo Fernandes; Marco Vasconcelos

Netherlands
3
Jotunhallen
19 February 1998

Ukraine
2

		Result
1	Jeroen van Dijk	2 – 0 (15–9, 18–15)	Konstantin Tatranov
2	Dicky Palyama	0 – 2 (12–15, 9–15)	Vladislav Druzchenko
3	Gerben Bruijstens	2 – 0 (15–7, 15–11)	Dmitry Miznikov
4	Norbert van Barneveld; Jurgen van Leeuwen	1 – 2 (12–15, 15–6, 7–15)	Vladislav Druzchenko; Mykhailo Mizin
5	Dennis Lens; Quinten van Dalm	2 – 0 (15–7, 15–9)	Dmitry Miznikov; Konstantin Tatranov

Portugal
3
Jotunhallen
19 February 1998

Iceland
2

		Result
1	Fernando Silva	2 – 0 (15–10, 15–2)	Tryggvi Nielsen
2	Marco Vasconcelos	0 – 2 (1–15, 13–15)	Broddi Kristjánsson
3	Ricardo Fernandes	2 – 1 (6–15, 15–3, 15–10)	Sveinn Sölvason
4	Hugo Rodrigues; Fernando Silva	1 – 2 (14–17, 15–13, 14–15)	Árni Þór Hallgrímsson; Broddi Kristjánsson
5	Ricardo Fernandes; Marco Vasconcelos	2 – 0 (15–4, 15–11)	Njörður Ludvigsson; Tryggvi Nielsen

==== Group Z ====
Pos	Team	Pld	W	L	MF	MA	MD	Pts	Qualification
1	Sweden	3	3	0	14	1	+13	3	Advance to knockout stage
2	Bulgaria	3	2	1	7	8	−1	2	
3	United States	3	1	2	5	10	−5	1	
4	Poland	3	0	3	4	11	−7	0	

Source: International Badminton Federation

Sweden
4
Jotunhallen
17 February 1998

Poland
1

		Result
1	Rickard Magnusson	1 – 2 (12–15, 15–7, 5–15)	Jacek Niedźwiedzki
2	Henrik Bengtsson	2 – 0 (15–4, 15–5)	Michał Łogosz
3	Tomas Johansson	2 – 0 (15–10, 15–4)	Kamil Turonek
4	Peter Axelsson; Pär-Gunnar Jönsson	2 – 0 (15–7, 15–11)	Michał Łogosz; Damian Pławecki
5	Henrik Andersson; Jens Olsson	2 – 0 (15–4, 15–3)	Jacek Niedźwiedzki; Kamil Turonek

Bulgaria
3
Jotunhallen
17 February 1998

United States
2

		Result
1	Boris Kesov	0 – 2 (6–15, 2–15)	Kevin Han
2	Mihail Popov	2 – 1 (5–15, 15–10, 15–8)	Ignatius Rusli
3	Ivan Sotirov	0 – 2 (6–15, 11–15)	Mark Manha
4	Mihail Popov; Svetoslav Stoyanov	2 – 0 (15–9, 15–6)	Howard Bach; Mark Manha
5	Boris Kesov; Ivan Sotirov	2 – 1 (10–15, 15–11, 15–10)	Kevin Han; Ignatius Rusli

Sweden
5
Jotunhallen
18 February 1998

United States
0

		Result
1	Rickard Magnusson	2 – 0 (15–13, 15–10)	Kevin Han
2	Tomas Johansson	2 – 0 (15–8, 15–1)	Howard Bach
3	Daniel Eriksson	2 – 0 (15–4, 15–9)	Mark Manha
4	Peter Axelsson; Pär-Gunnar Jönsson	2 – 0 (15–12, 15–10)	Howard Bach; Mark Manha
5	Henrik Andersson; Fredrik Bergström	2 – 0 (15–3, 15–2)	Kevin Han; Ignatius Rusli

Bulgaria
4
Jotunhallen
18 February 1998

Poland
1

		Result
1	Boris Kesov	2 – 0	Jacek Niedźwiedzki
2	Mihail Popov	1 – 2	Michał Łogosz
3	Konstantin Dobrev	2 – 0	Kamil Turonek
4	Mihail Popov; Svetoslav Stoyanov	2 – 0	Michał Łogosz; Damian Pławecki
5	Boris Kesov; Ivan Sotirov	2 – 1	Jacek Niedźwiedzki; Kamil Turonek

Sweden
5
Jotunhallen
19 February 1998

Bulgaria
0

		Result
1	Rickard Magnusson	2 – 0 (15–7, 15–4)	Boris Kesov
2	Henrik Bengtsson	2 – 0 (15–6, 15–5)	Ivan Sotirov
3	Tomas Johansson	2 – 0 (15–1, 17–14)	Konstantin Dobrev
4	Peter Axelsson; Pär-Gunnar Jönsson	2 – 0 (15–7, 15–4)	Mihail Popov; Svetoslav Stoyanov
5	Henrik Andersson; Jens Olsson	2 – 0 (15–6, 15–4)	Boris Kesov; Ivan Sotirov

Poland
2
Jotunhallen
19 February 1998

United States
3

		Result
1	Jacek Niedźwiedzki	0 – 2 (13–18, 5–15)	Kevin Han
2	Michał Łogosz	2 – 1 (6–15, 15–3, 15–9)	Howard Bach
3	Kamil Turonek	0 – 2 (11–15, 3–15)	Mark Manha
4	Michał Łogosz; Damian Pławecki	2 – 0 (15–12, 15–4)	Howard Bach; Mark Manha
5	Jacek Niedźwiedzki; Kamil Turonek	0 – 2 (13–15, 15–18)	Kevin Han; Ignatius Rusli

=== Knockout stage ===
Semi-finals
Denmark	5
England	0
Netherlands	4
Sweden	1

Final
Denmark	5
Netherlands	0
Third place
England	2
Sweden	3

==== Semi-finals ====
Denmark
5
Jotunhallen
20 February 1998

England
0

		Result
1	Peter Gade	2 – 0 (15–0, 15–2)	Colin Haughton
2	Poul-Erik Høyer Larsen	2 – 0 (18–14, 15–7)	Mark Constable
3	Kenneth Jonassen	2 – 0 (15–4, 15–6)	Peter Bush
4	Jens Eriksen; Jesper Larsen	2 – 1 (7–15, 15–3, 15–6)	Chris Hunt; Nathan Robertson
5	Martin Lundgaard Hansen; Michael Søgaard	2 – 1 (17–18, 17–14, 17–14)	Ian Pearson; Julian Robertson

Sweden
1
Jotunhallen
20 February 1998

Netherlands
4

		Result
1	Rickard Magnusson	1 – 2 (15–4, 12–15, 7–15)	Jeroen van Dijk
2	Henrik Bengtsson	1 – 2 (15–6, 10–15, 13–15)	Dicky Palyama
3	Tomas Johansson	0 – 1 (16^{r}–17)	Gerben Bruijstens
4	Peter Axelsson; Pär-Gunnar Jönsson	0 – 2 (8–15, 12–15)	Dennis Lens; Quinten van Dalm
5	Henrik Andersson; Jens Olsson	2 – 0 (15–6, 15–9)	Norbert van Barneveld; Jurgen van Leeuwen

==== Third place ====
Sweden
3
Jotunhallen
21 February 1998

England
2

		Result
1	Rickard Magnusson	1 – 2 (9–15, 15–9, 6–15)	Darren Hall
2	Henrik Bengtsson	2 – 0 (15–12, 15–6)	Colin Haughton
3	Tomas Johansson	1 – 2 (5–15, 15–9, 7–15)	Peter Bush
4	Peter Axelsson; Henrik Andersson	2 – 0 (15–3, 15–13)	Simon Archer; Chris Hunt
5	Pär-Gunnar Jönsson; Jens Olsson	2 – 0 (15–8, 15–7)	Ian Pearson; Julian Robertson

==== Final ====
Denmark
5
Jotunhallen
21 February 1998

Netherlands
0

		Result
1	Poul-Erik Høyer Larsen	2 – 1 (15–4, 12–15, 15–10)	Jeroen van Dijk
2	Kenneth Jonassen	2 – 0 (15–9, 15–12)	Dicky Palyama
3	Martin Lundgaard Hansen	2 – 0 (15–12, 15–7)	Gerben Bruijstens
4	Jon-Holst Christensen; Michael Søgaard	2 – 0 (15–12, 15–6)	Dennis Lens; Quinten van Dalm
5	Jens Eriksen; Jesper Larsen	2 – 1 (15–8, 15–4)	Norbert van Barneveld; Jurgen van Leeuwen
