= Michael O'Meara =

Irish hurler

Personal information
- Born: Nenagh, County Tipperary
- Height: 6 ft 1 in (185 cm)

Sport
- Sport: Hurling
- Position: Centre-Back
Club
- Years: Club
- Toomevara
Inter-county
- Years: County
- 1991–1994: Tipperary
Inter-county titles
- Munster titles: 2
- All-Irelands: 1
- NHL: 1

Michael O'Meara (born 4 February 1969) is a former Irish sportsperson. He played hurling with his local club Toomevara and with the Tipperary senior inter-county team in the 1990s.

== Career ==
O'Meara was a non-playing substitute as Tipperary won the 1991 All-Ireland Senior Hurling Championship with victory against Kilkenny by 1–16 to 0–15 in the final. In 1993 he captained Tipperary to win the 1993 Munster Senior Hurling Championship after a 3–27 to 2–12 win against Clare at the Gaelic Grounds. In May 1994 he picked up a winners medal as Tiperary won the 1994 National League, defeating Galway by 2–14 to 0–12 in the final.

| Preceded by Colm Bonnar | Tipperary Senior Hurling Captain; 1993 | Succeeded by Michael Cleary |
