= Jarrod King =

New Zealand badminton player

Medal record

Representing New Zealand

Men's badminton

Commonwealth Games
Bronze medal – third place	1998 Kuala Lumpur	Team

Jarrod King is a male badminton competitor for New Zealand. At the 1998 Commonwealth Games he won a bronze medal in the men's team event.
