= Heiki Sorge =

Estonian badminton player and coach

Heiki Sorge (born 3 November 1974 in Tartu) is an Estonian badminton player and coach.

In 2002 he graduated from the University of Tartu in physical education.

From 1996 until 2002, he participated 4 times on European Championships. Between 1993 and 2008, he become 21-times Estonian champion in different badminton disciplines. From 1993 until 2006, he was a member of Estonian national badminton team.

Awards:

- 1993-2004: Estonian best male badminton player.
