= Jacek Niedźwiedzki (politician) =

Polish badminton player and politician

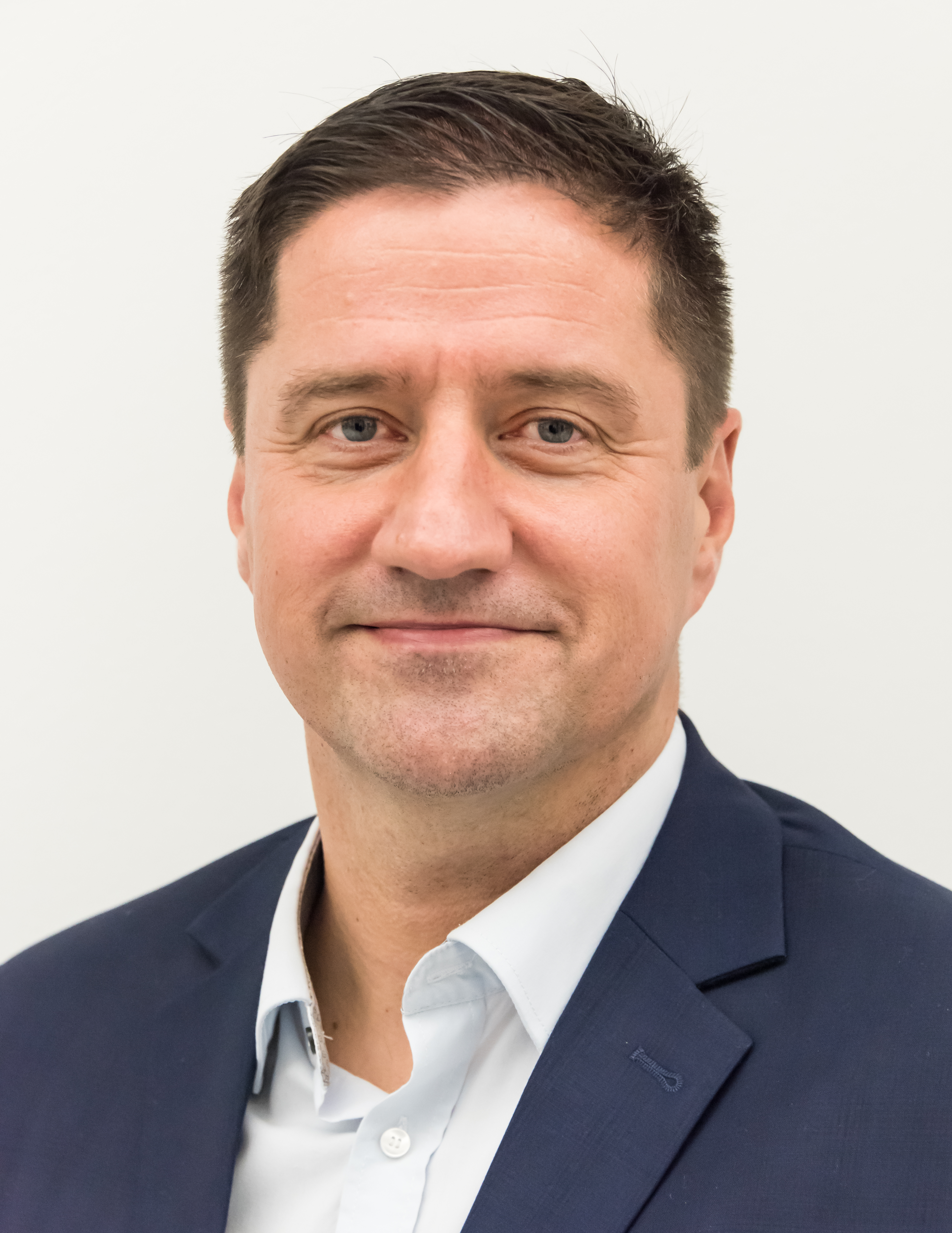
- Jacek Niedźwiedzki in 2023

Member of the Sejm
- Incumbent
- Assumed office 2023
- Constituency: 24 – Białystok

Personal details
- Born: June 13, 1975 (age 50); Suwałki, Polish People's Republic
- Political party: Civic Platform

Jacek Niedźwiedzki (born 13 June 1975) is a Polish badminton player and politician from the Civic Platform. In the 2023 Polish parliamentary election, he was elected to the Sejm from Białystok.
