= Kenneth Erichsen =

Guatemalan badminton player (born 1972)

Personal information
- Nationality: Guatemalan
- Born: 28 December 1972 (age 52)

Sport
- Sport: Badminton

Kenneth Erichsen (born 28 December 1972) is a Guatemalan badminton player. He competed in the men's singles tournament at the 1996 Summer Olympics.
