= Jim Mailer =

Scottish international badminton player

Personal information
- Nationality: British (Scottish)
- Born: 10 December 1968

Sport
- Sport: Badminton
- Club: Stirling
Medal record
Representing Scotland
Scottish Nationals
| Gold medal – first place | 1993, 96, 97 | singles |

James Mailer (born 10 December 1968) is a former international badminton player from Scotland who competed at the Commonwealth Games.

== Biography ==
Mailer born in 1968, was based in Stirling and represented Scotland at international level. He won his first title in January 1990, claiming the singles at the East of Scotland Championships.

Mailer represented the Scottish team at the 1998 Commonwealth Games in Kuala Lumpur, Malaysia, where he competed in the badminton events.

He was the three-times singles champion at the Scottish National Badminton Championships in 1993, 1996 and 1997.

He announced his retirement after the 1998 Commonwealth Games but returned in 1999.
