= 1994 Thomas Cup qualification =

Tournament details
- Dates: 20 – 27 February 1994
- Location: Asian zone: Singapore; European zone: Glasgow

The qualifying process for the 1994 Thomas Cup took place from 20 to 27 February 1994 to decide the final teams which would play in the final tournament.

== Qualification process ==
The qualification process was divided into two regions, the Asian Zone and the European Zone. Seeded teams received a bye into the second round while unseeded teams competed in the first round for a place in the second round. The first two rounds were played in a round-robin format. Teams in the second round competed for a place in the knockout stages. Semi-final winners in each zone were guaranteed qualification for the final tournament to be held in Jakarta while the remaining teams competed in a third place playoff match for a place in the final tournament.

Malaysia qualified for the final tournament as defending champions while Indonesia qualified as hosts.

=== Qualified teams ===
| Country | Qualified as | Qualified on | Final appearance |
|---|---|---|---|
| Indonesia | 1994 Thomas Cup hosts | 11 April 1993 | 15th |
| Malaysia | 1992 Thomas Cup winners | 16 May 1992 | 15th |
| China | Asian Zone winners | 27 February 1994 | 7th |
| South Korea | Asian Zone runners-up | 27 February 1994 | 6th |
| Thailand | Third place in Asian Zone | 27 February 1994 | 7th |
| Denmark | European Zone winners | 27 February 1994 | 18th |
| Sweden | European Zone runners-up | 27 February 1994 | 6th |
| Finland | Third place in European Zone | 27 February 1994 | 1st |

== Asian Zone ==
The qualification rounds for the Asian Zone were held from 20 to 27 February at Singapore Badminton Hall in Singapore. Fifteen teams took part in qualifying for the final tournament. Kazakhstan, North Korea and the Philippines withdrew from the tournament.

=== First round ===
==== Group A ====
| Pos | Team | Pld | W | L | MF | MA | MD | Pts | Qualification |
|---|---|---|---|---|---|---|---|---|---|
| 1 | Singapore | 2 | 2 | 0 | 8 | 2 | +6 | 2 | Advance to second round |
| 2 | Sri Lanka | 2 | 1 | 1 | 7 | 3 | +4 | 1 | |
| 3 | Iran | 2 | 0 | 2 | 0 | 10 | −10 | 0 | |
| 4 | Philippines | 0 | 0 | 0 | 0 | 0 | 0 | 0 | Withdrew |

Source: The Straits Times

Sri Lanka
5
Singapore Badminton Hall
20 February 1994

Iran
0

| | | Result |
|---|---|---|---|
| 1 | Duminda Jayakody | 2 – 0 (15–6, 15–11) | Morteza Validarvi |
| 2 | Thushara Edirisinghe | 2 – 0 (15–12, 15–2) | Bahador Zakizadeh |
| 3 | Udaya Weerakoon | 2 – 0 (15–12, 15–4) | Hameed Nasimi |
| 4 | Duminda Jayakody; Udaya Weerakoon | 2 – 1 (15–5, 12–15, 15–6) | Ali Reza Shafiee; Bahador Zakizadeh |
| 5 | Thushara Edirisinghe; Asanka de Silva | 2 – 0 (17–15, 15–5) | Hameed Nasimi; Morteza Validarvi |

Singapore
5
Singapore Badminton Hall
20 February 1994

Iran
0

| | | Result |
|---|---|---|---|
| 1 | John Lim | 2 – 0 (15–6, 15–5) | Morteza Validarvi |
| 2 | Donald Koh | 2 – 0 (15–9, 17–16) | Bahador Zakizadeh |
| 3 | Tan Sian Peng | 2 – 0 (15–12, 15–4) | Hameed Nasimi |
| 4 | Abdul Hamid Khan; Lim Boon Leng | 2 – 0 (15–5, 15–4) | Ali Reza Shafiee; Bahador Zakizadeh |
| 5 | Patrick Lau; Lim Hong Han | 2 – 1 (15–6, 17–18, 15–1) | Hameed Nasimi; Morteza Validarvi |

Singapore
3
Singapore Badminton Hall
21 February 1994

Sri Lanka
2

| | | Result |
|---|---|---|---|
| 1 | Abdul Hamid Khan | 1 – 2 (15–8, 5–15, 4–15) | Duminda Jayakody |
| 2 | John Lim | 0 – 2 (3–15, 9–15) | Thushara Edirisinghe |
| 3 | Donald Koh | 2 – 0 (15–5, 15–10) | Udaya Weerakoon |
| 4 | Patrick Lau; Lim Hong Han | 2 – 0 (15–8, 15–4) | Thushara Edirisinghe; Asanka de Silva |
| 5 | Abdul Hamid Khan; Lim Boon Leng | 2 – 0 (15–2, 15–6) | Duminda Jayakody; Udaya Weerakoon |

==== Group B ====
| Pos | Team | Pld | W | L | MF | MA | MD | Pts | Qualification |
|---|---|---|---|---|---|---|---|---|---|
| 1 | India | 2 | 2 | 0 | 10 | 0 | +10 | 2 | Advance to second round |
| 2 | Pakistan | 2 | 1 | 1 | 5 | 5 | 0 | 1 | |
| 3 | Mexico | 2 | 0 | 2 | 0 | 10 | −10 | 0 | |
| 4 | Kazakhstan | 0 | 0 | 0 | 0 | 0 | 0 | 0 | Withdrew |

Source: The Straits Times

India
5
Singapore Badminton Hall
20 February 1994

Mexico
0

| | | Result |
|---|---|---|---|
| 1 | Rajeev Bagga | 2 – 0 (15–12, 15–5) | Juan Carlos García |
| 2 | Srikant Bakshi | 2 – 0 (15–12, 15–5) | Luis Lópezllera |
| 3 | Dipankar Bhattacharjee | 2 – 0 (15–5, 15–2) | Fernando de la Torre |
| 4 | Jaseel P. Ismail; George Thomas | 2 – 0 (15–1, 15–1) | Fernando de la Torre; Abel Ballesteros |
| 5 | Ajay Kanwar; Vijaydeep Singh | 2 – 0 (15–0, 15–6) | Juan Carlos García; Luis Lópezllera |

Pakistan
5
Singapore Badminton Hall
20 February 1994

Mexico
0

| | | Result |
|---|---|---|---|
| 1 | Amir Islam | 2 – 0 (15–2, 15–4) | Fernando de la Torre |
| 2 | Iftikhar Hussain | 2 – 0 (17–14, 15–11) | Luis Lópezllera |
| 3 | Saqib Majeed | 2 – 0 (15–5, 15–1) | Juan Carlos García |
| 4 | Amir Islam; Tariq Mahmood | 2 – 1 (15–13, 10–15, 15–9) | Fernando de la Torre; Luis Lópezllera |
| 5 | Iftikhar Hussain; Saqib Majeed | 2 – 0 (15–2, 15–2) | Juan Carlos García; Abel Ballesteros |

India
5
Singapore Badminton Hall
21 February 1994

Pakistan
0

| | | Result |
|---|---|---|---|
| 1 | Dipankar Bhattacharjee | 2 – 0 (15–3, 15–3) | Amir Islam |
| 2 | Rajeev Bagga | 2 – 0 (15–9, 15–10) | Saqib Majeed |
| 3 | Srikant Bakshi | 2 – 0 (15–7, 15–1) | Iftikhar Hussain |
| 4 | Ajay Kanwar; Vijaydeep Singh | 2 – 0 (15–2, 15–2) | Amir Islam; Tariq Mahmood |
| 5 | Jaseel P. Ismail; George Thomas | 2 – 0 (18–15, 15–12) | Iftikhar Hussain; Saqib Majeed |

==== Group C ====
| Pos | Team | Pld | W | L | MF | MA | MD | Pts | Qualification |
|---|---|---|---|---|---|---|---|---|---|
| 1 | Australia | 3 | 3 | 0 | 15 | 0 | +15 | 3 | Advance to second round |
| 2 | Mauritius | 3 | 2 | 1 | 8 | 7 | +1 | 2 | |
| 3 | Macau | 3 | 1 | 2 | 4 | 11 | −7 | 1 | |
| 4 | Nepal | 3 | 0 | 3 | 2 | 13 | −11 | 0 | |
| 5 | North Korea | 0 | 0 | 0 | 0 | 0 | 0 | 0 | Withdrew |

Source: The Straits Times

Macau
3
Singapore Badminton Hall
20 February 1994

Nepal
2

| | | Result |
|---|---|---|---|
| 1 | Sam Kai Chong | 1 – 2 (18–17, 4–15, 7–15) | Sudip Kumar Yonjan |
| 2 | Leong Pui Lin | 2 – 0 (15–8, 15–6) | Kiran Thapa |
| 3 | Joaquim Lobo | 0 – 2 (8–15, 3–15) | Nabin Shah |
| 4 | Sam Kai Chong; Sam Kin Chong | 2 – 1 (9–15, 15–3, 15–5) | Jayant Kumar Shrestha; Sudip Kumar Yonjan |
| 5 | Iek Weng Kai; Joaquim Lobo | 2 – 1 (15–2, 12–15, 15–7) | Nabin Shah; Kiran Thapa |

Australia
5
Singapore Badminton Hall
20 February 1994

Mauritius
0

| | | Result |
|---|---|---|---|
| 1 | Paul Stevenson | 2 – 1 (9–15, 15–5, 15–4) | Eddy Clarisse |
| 2 | Murray Hocking | 2 – 0 (15–1, 15–3) | Reaz Vawda |
| 3 | Paul Staight | 2 – 0 (15–10, 15–9) | Stephan Beeharry |
| 4 | Peter Blackburn; Mark Nichols | 2 – 0 (15–1, 15–2) | Gilles Allet; Eddy Clarisse |
| 5 | Murray Hocking; Paul Stevenson | 2 – 0 (15–12, 15–4) | Stephan Beeharry; Stenio Poisson |

Australia
5
Singapore Badminton Hall
20 February 1994

Nepal
0

| | | Result |
|---|---|---|---|
| 1 | Paul Stevenson | 2 – 0 (15–4, 15–9) | Sudip Kumar Yonjan |
| 2 | Murray Hocking | 2 – 0 (15–1, 15–0) | Kiran Thapa |
| 3 | Stuart Metcalfe | 2 – 0 (15–5, 15–6) | Nabin Shah |
| 4 | Murray Hocking; Paul Stevenson | 2 – 0 (15–8, 15–3) | Jayant Kumar Shrestha; Sudip Kumar Yonjan |
| 5 | Peter Blackburn; Mark Nichols | 2 – 0 (15–5, 15–2) | Nabin Shah; Kiran Thapa |

Macau
1
Singapore Badminton Hall
20 February 1994

Mauritius
4

| | | Result |
|---|---|---|---|
| 1 | Leong Pui Lin | 2 – 1 (18–14, 6–15, 15–12) | Reaz Vawda |
| 2 | Sam Kai Chong | 0 – 2 (1–15, 1–15) | Eddy Clarisse |
| 3 | Sam Soi Meng | 0 – 2 (1–15, 2–15) | Stephan Beeharry |
| 4 | Iek Weng Kai; Joaquim Lobo | 0 – 2 (5–15, 8–15) | Gilles Allet; Eddy Clarisse |
| 5 | Sam Kai Chong; Sam Kin Chong | 0 – 2 (5–15, 16–18) | Stephan Beeharry; Stenio Poisson |

Mauritius
4
Singapore Badminton Hall
21 February 1994

Nepal
1

| | | Result |
|---|---|---|---|
| 1 | Eddy Clarisse | 2 – 0 (15–5, 15–10) | Sudip Kumar Yonjan |
| 2 | Reaz Vawda | 2 – 1 (6–15, 15–11, 15–12) | Nabin Shah |
| 3 | Stephan Beeharry | 2 – 0 (15–2, 15–1) | Jayant Kumar Shrestha |
| 4 | Gilles Allet; Eddy Clarisse | 1 – 1 (15–6, 15–17, 0^{r}–0) | Nabin Shah; Kiran Thapa |
| 5 | Stephan Beeharry; Stenio Poisson | – Walkover | Jayant Kumar Shrestha; Sudip Kumar Yonjan |

Australia
5
Singapore Badminton Hall
21 February 1994

Macau
0

| | | Result |
|---|---|---|---|
| 1 | Paul Stevenson | 2 – 0 (15–1, 15–0) | Sam Kai Chong |
| 2 | Murray Hocking | 2 – 0 (15–3, 15–0) | Leong Pui Lin |
| 3 | Paul Staight | 2 – 0 (15–3, 15–6) | Joaquim Lobo |
| 4 | Peter Blackburn; Mark Nichols | 2 – 0 (15–2, 15–1) | Joaquim Lobo; Sam Kai Chong |
| 5 | Murray Hocking; Paul Stevenson | 2 – 0 (15–2, 15–9) | Iek Weng Kai; Sam Kin Chong |

=== Second round ===
==== Group X ====
| Pos | Team | Pld | W | L | MF | MA | MD | Pts | Qualification |
|---|---|---|---|---|---|---|---|---|---|
| 1 | South Korea | 3 | 3 | 0 | 13 | 2 | +11 | 3 | Advance to knockout stage |
| 2 | Chinese Taipei | 3 | 2 | 1 | 11 | 4 | +7 | 2 | Advance to knockout stage |
| 3 | India | 3 | 1 | 2 | 6 | 9 | −3 | 1 | |
| 4 | Singapore | 3 | 0 | 3 | 1 | 14 | −13 | 0 | |

Source: The Straits Times

South Korea
5
Singapore Badminton Hall
23 February 1994

Singapore
0

| | | Result |
|---|---|---|---|
| 1 | Kim Chul-joong | 2 – 0 (15–6, 15–10) | Donald Koh |
| 2 | Park Sung-woo | 2 – 0 (15–2, 15–1) | Adrian Tay |
| 3 | Kim Hak-kyun | 2 – 0 (15–2, 15–4) | John Lim |
| 4 | Ha Tae-kwon; Yoo Yong-sung | 2 – 0 (15–3, 15–5) | Abdul Hamid Khan; Lim Boon Leng |
| 5 | Lee Gwang-jin; Lee Suk-ho | 2 – 0 (15–4, 15–2) | Patrick Lau; Yow Chong Liang |

Chinese Taipei
4
Singapore Badminton Hall
23 February 1994

India
1

| | | Result |
|---|---|---|---|
| 1 | Lin Wei-chen | 2 – 1 (15–10, 12–15, 15–13) | Dipankar Bhattacharjee |
| 2 | Liu En-hung | 2 – 0 (15–12, 15–11) | Srikant Bakshi |
| 3 | Wu Chun-sheng | 0 – 2 (9–15, 4–15) | Rajeev Bagga |
| 4 | Horng Shin-jeng; Huang Chuan-chen | 2 – 1 (15–7, 9–15, 15–5) | Jaseel P. Ismail; George Thomas |
| 5 | Liao Kuo-mao; Yang Shih-jeng | 2 – 0 (15–7, 15–4) | Ajay Kanwar; Vijaydeep Singh |

South Korea
4
Singapore Badminton Hall
24 February 1994

India
1

| | | Result |
|---|---|---|---|
| 1 | Park Sung-woo | 2 – 0 (15–10, 18–15) | Dipankar Bhattacharjee |
| 2 | Ahn Jae-chang | 2 – 0 (15–8, 15–9) | Srikant Bakshi |
| 3 | Kim Chul-joong | 1 – 2 (15–12, 14–17, 10–15) | Rajeev Bagga |
| 4 | Ha Tae-kwon; Yoo Yong-sung | 2 – 0 (15–6, 15–4) | Jaseel P. Ismail; George Thomas |
| 5 | Choi Ji-tae; Lee Suk-ho | 2 – 0 (15–10, 15–9) | Ajay Kanwar; Vijaydeep Singh |

Chinese Taipei
5
Singapore Badminton Hall
24 February 1994

Singapore
0

| | | Result |
|---|---|---|---|
| 1 | Lin Wei-chen | 2 – 1 (11–15, 15–5, 15–12) | Abdul Hamid Khan |
| 2 | Liu En-hung | 2 – 0 (15–4, 15–5) | Adrian Tay |
| 3 | Wu Chun-sheng | 2 – 0 (15–11, 15–12) | Donald Koh |
| 4 | Horng Shin-jeng; Huang Chuan-chen | 2 – 1 (15–10, 15–2) | Abdul Hamid Khan; Lim Boon Leng |
| 5 | Liao Kuo-mao; Yang Shih-jeng | 2 – 0 (15–12, 15–4) | Patrick Lau; Lim Hong Han |

India
4
Singapore Badminton Hall
25 February 1994

Singapore
1

| | | Result |
|---|---|---|---|
| 1 | Dipankar Bhattacharjee | 2 – 0 (15–4, 15–3) | John Lim |
| 2 | Srikant Bakshi | 2 – 0 (15–10, 18–13) | Donald Koh |
| 3 | Rajeev Bagga | 2 – 0 (15–7, 15–9) | Lim Boon Leng |
| 4 | Jaseel P. Ismail; George Thomas | 2 – 1 (3–15, 12–15) | Abdul Hamid Khan; Lim Boon Leng |
| 5 | Ajay Kanwar; Vijaydeep Singh | 2 – 0 (15–12, 15–6) | Patrick Lau; Lim Hong Han |

South Korea
5
Singapore Badminton Hall
25 February 1994

Chinese Taipei
0

| | | Result |
|---|---|---|---|
| 1 | Kim Hak-kyun | 2 – 0 (15–2, 15–11) | Lin Wei-chen |
| 2 | Park Sung-woo | 2 – 1 (15–8, 2–15, 15–3) | Liu En-hung |
| 3 | Ahn Jae-chang | 2 – 0 (15–9, 15–11) | Wu Chun-sheng |
| 4 | Ha Tae-kwon; Yoo Yong-sung | 2 – 1 (18–15, 8–15, 15–8) | Horng Shin-jeng; Huang Chuan-chen |
| 5 | Lee Gwang-jin; Lee Suk-ho | 2 – 0 (15–5, 15–3) | Liao Kuo-mao; Yang Shih-jeng |

==== Group Y ====
| Pos | Team | Pld | W | L | MF | MA | MD | Pts | Qualification |
|---|---|---|---|---|---|---|---|---|---|
| 1 | China | 3 | 3 | 0 | 14 | 1 | +13 | 3 | Advance to knockout stage |
| 2 | Thailand | 3 | 2 | 1 | 9 | 6 | +3 | 2 | Advance to knockout stage |
| 3 | Japan | 3 | 1 | 2 | 6 | 9 | −3 | 1 | |
| 4 | Australia | 3 | 0 | 3 | 1 | 14 | −13 | 0 | |

Source: The Straits Times

China
5
Singapore Badminton Hall
23 February 1994

Australia
0

| | | Result |
|---|---|---|---|
| 1 | Xie Yangchun | 2 – 0 (15–0, 15–7) | Paul Staight |
| 2 | Dong Jiong | 2 – 0 (15–10, 15–7) | Murray Hocking |
| 3 | Liu Jun | 2 – 0 (15–11, 15–3) | Paul Stevenson |
| 4 | Chen Hongyong; Chen Kang | 2 – 0 (15–12, 15–9) | Peter Blackburn; Mark Nichols |
| 5 | Huang Zhanzhong; Jiang Xin | 2 – 0 (15–3, 15–6) | Murray Hocking; Paul Stevenson |

Thailand
5
Singapore Badminton Hall
23 February 1994

Japan
0

| | | Result |
|---|---|---|---|
| 1 | Teeranun Chiangta | 2 – 0 (15–9, 15–1) | Shuji Matsuno |
| 2 | Sompol Kukasemkij | 2 – 0 (15–5, 15–3) | Fumihiko Machida |
| 3 | Kasemsak Chatujinda | 2 – 0 (15–13, 15–3) | Takahiro Suka |
| 4 | Pramote Teerawiwatana; Sakrapee Thongsari | 2 – 1 (11–15, 15–12, 18–16) | Takuya Katayama; Yuzo Kubota |
| 5 | Siripong Siripool; Khunakorn Sudhisodhi | 2 – 1 (15–12, 12–15, 15–10) | Fumihiko Machida; Shuji Matsuno |

China
4
Singapore Badminton Hall
24 February 1994

Japan
1

| | | Result |
|---|---|---|---|
| 1 | Liu Jun | 1 – 2 (15–3, 12–15, 9–15) | Fumihiko Machida |
| 2 | Dong Jiong | 2 – 0 (15–8, 15–7) | Takahiro Suka |
| 3 | Hu Zhilan | 2 – 0 (15–6, 15–5) | Kazuhiro Honda |
| 4 | Chen Hongyong; Chen Kang | 2 – 0 (15–11, 15–11) | Takuya Katayama; Yuzo Kubota |
| 5 | Huang Zhanzhong; Jiang Xin | 2 – 0 (15–12, 15–6) | Fumihiko Machida; Takahiro Suka |

Thailand
4
Singapore Badminton Hall
24 February 1994

Australia
1

| | | Result |
|---|---|---|---|
| 1 | Sompol Kukasemkij | 2 – 0 (15–6, 15–11) | Paul Stevenson |
| 2 | Kasemsak Chatujinda | 0 – 2 (10–15, 12–15) | Murray Hocking |
| 3 | Teeranun Chiangta | 2 – 0 (18–13, 15–8) | Paul Staight |
| 4 | Pramote Teerawiwatana; Sakrapee Thongsari | 2 – 0 (15–9, 15–7) | Peter Blackburn; Mark Nichols |
| 5 | Siripong Siripool; Khunakorn Sudhisodhi | 2 – 0 (15–2, 15–3) | Murray Hocking; Paul Stevenson |

China
5
Singapore Badminton Hall
25 February 1994

Thailand
0

| | | Result |
|---|---|---|---|
| 1 | Dong Jiong | 2 – 0 (15–4, 15–6) | Kittipon Kittikul |
| 2 | Hu Zhilan | 2 – 0 (15–5, 15–3) | Prapon Prapaitrakul |
| 3 | Xie Yangchun | 2 – 0 (15–2, 15–6) | Teeranun Chiangta |
| 4 | Chen Hongyong; Chen Kang | 2 – 0 (15–7, 15–8) | Siripong Siripool; Khunakorn Sudhisodhi |
| 5 | Huang Zhanzhong; Jiang Xin | 2 – 1 (15–5, 13–15, 15–5) | Kittipon Kittikul; Sakrapee Thongsari |

Japan
5
Singapore Badminton Hall
25 February 1994

Australia
0

| | | Result |
|---|---|---|---|
| 1 | Fumihiko Machida | 2 – 1 (12–15, 15–6, 15–1) | Paul Stevenson |
| 2 | Takahiro Suka | 2 – 0 (15–5, 15–6) | Murray Hocking |
| 3 | Kazuhiro Honda | 2 – 1 (11–15, 15–5, 15–4) | Paul Staight |
| 4 | Shuji Matsuno; Shinji Matsuura | 2 – 0 (15–6, 15–12) | Peter Blackburn; Mark Nichols |
| 5 | Takuya Katayama; Yuzo Kubota | 2 – 0 (15–8, 15–4) | Murray Hocking; Paul Staight |

=== Knockout stage ===
Semi-finals
China | 5
Chinese Taipei | 0
Thailand | 0
South Korea | 5

Final
China | 3
South Korea | 2
Third place
Thailand | 4
Chinese Taipei | 1

==== Semi-finals ====
China
5
Singapore Badminton Hall
26 February 1994

Chinese Taipei
0

| | | Result |
|---|---|---|---|
| 1 | Liu Jun | 2 – 0 (15–6, 15–7) | Lin Wei-chen |
| 2 | Dong Jiong | 2 – 0 (15–4, 15–5) | Liu En-hung |
| 3 | Xie Yangchun | 2 – 0 (15–6, 15–2) | Wu Chun-sheng |
| 4 | Chen Hongyong; Chen Kang | 2 – 0 (15–3, 15–2) | Horng Shin-jeng; Huang Chuan-chen |
| 5 | Huang Zhanzhong; Jiang Xin | 2 – 0 (15–2, 15–4) | Liao Kuo-mao; Yang Shih-jeng |

South Korea
5
Singapore Badminton Hall
26 February 1994

Thailand
0

| | | Result |
|---|---|---|---|
| 1 | Kim Hak-kyun | 2 – 0 (15–2, 15–2) | Kittipon Kittikul |
| 2 | Park Sung-woo | 2 – 0 (15–1, 15–1) | Prapon Prapaitrakul |
| 3 | Ahn Jae-chang | 2 – 0 (15–6, 15–8) | Teeranun Chiangta |
| 4 | Ha Tae-kwon; Yoo Yong-sung | 2 – 0 (15–3, 15–5) | Kasemsak Chatujinda; Khunakorn Sudhisodhi |
| 5 | Lee Gwang-jin; Lee Suk-ho | 2 – 0 (15–6, 15–10) | Teeranun Chiangta; Kittipon Kittikul |

==== Third place ====
Thailand
4
Singapore Badminton Hall
27 February 1994

Chinese Taipei
1

| | | Result |
|---|---|---|---|
| 1 | Sompol Kukasemkij | 2 – 0 (15–7, 15–9) | Lin Wei-chen |
| 2 | Kasemsak Chatujinda | 0 – 2 (5–15, 1–15) | Liu En-hung |
| 3 | Teeranun Chiangta | 2 – 1 (17–18, 15–3, 15–5) | Wu Chun-sheng |
| 4 | Pramote Teerawiwatana; Sakrapee Thongsari | 2 – 1 (15–7, 17–15) | Horng Shin-jeng; Huang Chuan-chen |
| 5 | Siripong Siripool; Khunakorn Sudhisodhi | 2 – 0 (15–11, 15–9) | Liao Kuo-mao; Yang Shih-jeng |

==== Final ====
China
3
Singapore Badminton Hall
27 February 1994

South Korea
2

| | | Result |
|---|---|---|---|
| 1 | Dong Jiong | 2 – 1 (15–10, 7–15, 15–9) | Kim Hak-kyun |
| 2 | Hu Zhilan | 0 – 2 (7–15, 10–15) | Park Sung-woo |
| 3 | Xie Yangchun | 1 – 2 (18–17, 5–15, 4–15) | Ahn Jae-chang |
| 4 | Chen Hongyong; Chen Kang | 2 – 0 (15–8, 15–10) | Ha Tae-kwon; Yoo Yong-sung |
| 5 | Huang Zhanzhong; Jiang Xin | 2 – 1 (15–5, 11–15, 15–6) | Lee Gwang-jin; Lee Suk-ho |

== European Zone ==
The European qualifying rounds were held in Kelvin Hall in Glasgow, Scotland. Botswana and Turkey withdrew from the tournament.

=== First round ===
==== Group A ====
| Pos | Team | Pld | W | L | MF | MA | MD | Pts | Qualification |
|---|---|---|---|---|---|---|---|---|---|
| 1 | Belarus | 3 | 3 | 0 | 12 | 3 | +9 | 3 | Advance to second round |
| 2 | Wales | 3 | 2 | 1 | 10 | 5 | +5 | 2 | |
| 3 | Ireland | 3 | 1 | 2 | 8 | 7 | +1 | 1 | |
| 4 | Slovenia | 3 | 0 | 3 | 0 | 15 | −15 | 0 | |

Source: Wolverhampton Express and Star

Ireland
2
Kelvin Hall
20 February 1994

Wales
3

| | | Result |
|---|---|---|---|
| 1 | Michael Watt | 2 – 0 (15–8, 15–5) | John Leung |
| 2 | Bruce Topping | 0 – 2 (16–17, 6–15) | Geraint Lewis |
| 3 | Jim Colfor | 0 – 2 (12–15, 4–15) | Chris Rees |
| 4 | Bruce Topping; Mark Topping | 2 – 0 (15–12, 15–3) | Peter Hybart; Richard Vaughan |
| 5 | Michael O'Meara; Mark Peard | 0 – 2 (9–15, 6–15) | Chris Rees; David Tonks |

Belarus
5
Kelvin Hall
20 February 1994

Slovenia
0

| | | Result |
|---|---|---|---|
| 1 | Mikhail Korshuk | 2 – 0 | Miha Košnik |
| 2 | Vitaliy Shmakov | 2 – 0 | Andrej Pohar |
| 3 | Vyatcheslav Roudnitski | 2 – 0 | Sašo Zrnec |
| 4 | Mikhail Korshuk; Vitaliy Shmakov | 2 – 0 | Jaka Pelhan; Andrej Pohar |
| 5 | Yuri Gromyko; Vyatcheslav Roudnitski | 2 – 0 | Aleš Babnik; Mišo Mattias |

Ireland
5
Kelvin Hall
21 February 1994

Slovenia
0

| | | Result |
|---|---|---|---|
| 1 | Michael Watt | 2 – 0 (15–7, 15–4) | Miha Košnik |
| 2 | Bruce Topping | 2 – 0 (15–8, 15–12) | Andrej Pohar |
| 3 | Mark Peard | 2 – 0 (15–8, 15–10) | Sašo Zrnec |
| 4 | Michael O'Meara; Mark Peard | 2 – 0 (15–3, 15–4) | Jaka Pelhan; Andrej Pohar |
| 5 | Bruce Topping; Mark Topping | 2 – 0 (15–1, 15–10) | Aleš Babnik; Mišo Mattias |

Belarus
3
Kelvin Hall
21 February 1994

Wales
2

| | | Result |
|---|---|---|---|
| 1 | Mikhail Korshuk | 2 – 1 (14–17, 15–10, 15–10) | John Leung |
| 2 | Vitaliy Shmakov | 2 – 0 (18–14, 15–12) | Geraint Lewis |
| 3 | Vyatcheslav Roudnitski | 0 – 2 (2–15, 4–15) | Chris Rees |
| 4 | Mikhail Korshuk; Vitaliy Shmakov | 2 – 1 (7–15, 15–8, 15–11) | Chris Rees; David Tonks |
| 5 | Yuri Gromyko; Vyatcheslav Roudnitski | 0 – 2 (6–15, 15–18) | Peter Hybart; Richard Vaughan |

Wales
5
Kelvin Hall
22 February 1994

Slovenia
0

| | | Result |
|---|---|---|---|
| 1 | John Leung | 2 – 0 (15–3, 15–7) | Miha Košnik |
| 2 | Geraint Lewis | 2 – 0 (15–6, 15–5) | Sašo Zrnec |
| 3 | Chris Rees | 2 – 0 (18–14, 15–3) | Jaka Pelhan |
| 4 | Peter Hybart; Richard Vaughan | 2 – 0 (15–3, 15–11) | Aleš Babnik; Mišo Mattias |
| 5 | Chris Rees; David Tonks | 2 – 0 (15–2, 15–2) | Jaka Pelhan; Andrej Pohar |

Ireland
1
Kelvin Hall
22 February 1994

Belarus
4

| | | Result |
|---|---|---|---|
| 1 | Michael Watt | 0 – 2 (5–15, 7–15) | Mikhail Korshuk |
| 2 | Bruce Topping | 0 – 2 (13–15, 7–15) | Vitaliy Shmakov |
| 3 | Jim Colfor | 0 – 2 (7–15, 4–15) | Vyatcheslav Roudnitski |
| 4 | Michael O'Meara; Mark Peard | 0 – 2 (14–17, 8–15) | Mikhail Korshuk; Vitaliy Shmakov |
| 5 | Bruce Topping; Mark Topping | 2 – 0 (15–1, 15–7) | Yuri Gromyko; Vyatcheslav Roudnitski |

==== Group B ====
| Pos | Team | Pld | W | L | MF | MA | MD | Pts | Qualification |
|---|---|---|---|---|---|---|---|---|---|
| 1 | Norway | 3 | 3 | 0 | 13 | 2 | +11 | 3 | Advance to second round |
| 2 | United States | 3 | 2 | 1 | 11 | 4 | +7 | 2 | |
| 3 | South Africa | 3 | 1 | 2 | 6 | 9 | −3 | 1 | |
| 4 | Israel | 3 | 0 | 3 | 0 | 15 | −15 | 0 | |

Source: Wolverhampton Express and Star

United States
5
Kelvin Hall
20 February 1994

Israel
0

| | | Result |
|---|---|---|---|
| 1 | Thomas Reidy | 2 – 0 (15–7, 15–4) | Amir Moses |
| 2 | Benny Lee | 2 – 0 (15–11, 15–2) | Meni Gershon |
| 3 | Kevin Han | 2 – 0 (15–12, 15–4) | Yoni Azran |
| 4 | Benny Lee; Thomas Reidy | 2 – 0 (15–4, 15–4) | Amir Moses; Reuven Moses |
| 5 | Mike Edstrom; Kevin Han | 2 – 0 (15–3, 15–7) | Yoni Azran; Meni Gershon |

Norway
5
Kelvin Hall
20 February 1994

South Africa
0

| | | Result |
|---|---|---|---|
| 1 | Hans Sperre Jr. | 2 – 0 | Anton Kriel |
| 2 | Erik Lia | 2 – 0 | Johan Kleingeld |
| 3 | Øystein Larsen | 2 – 0 | Alan Phillips |
| 4 | Hans Sperre Jr. Trond Wåland | 2 – 0 | Anton Kriel; Nico Meerholz |
| 5 | Tor Egil Kristensen; Erik Lia | 2 – 0 | Alan Phillips; David Phillips |

United States
4
Kelvin Hall
21 February 1994

South Africa
1

| | | Result |
|---|---|---|---|
| 1 | Thomas Reidy | 2 – 0 (18–15, 15–8) | Anton Kriel |
| 2 | Kevin Han | 2 – 0 (15–7, 15–4) | Johan Kleingeld |
| 3 | David Shaw | 2 – 0 (15–1, 15–7) | Alan Phillips |
| 4 | Benny Lee; Thomas Reidy | 2 – 1 (8–15, 15–8, 15–4) | Anton Kriel; Nico Meerholz |
| 5 | Mike Edstrom; Kevin Han | 1 – 2 (18–14, 6–15, 6–15) | Alan Phillips; David Phillips |

Norway
5
Kelvin Hall
21 February 1994

Israel
0

| | | Result |
|---|---|---|---|
| 1 | Hans Sperre Jr. | 2 – 0 | Amir Moses |
| 2 | Erik Lia | 2 – 0 | Meni Gershon |
| 3 | Øystein Larsen | 2 – 0 | Yoni Azran |
| 4 | Tor Egil Kristensen; Erik Lia | 2 – 0 | Amir Moses; Reuven Moses |
| 5 | Jim Ronny Andersen; Trond Wåland | 2 – 0 | Yoni Azran; Meni Gershon |

United States
2
Kelvin Hall
22 February 1994

Norway
3

| | | Result |
|---|---|---|---|
| 1 | Thomas Reidy | 0 – 2 (10–15, 1–15) | Hans Sperre Jr. |
| 2 | Kevin Han | 2 – 0 (15–8, 15–12) | Erik Lia |
| 3 | David Shaw | 1 – 2 (9–15, 15–12, 4–15) | Øystein Larsen |
| 4 | Benny Lee; Thomas Reidy | 2 – 1 (12–15, 15–13, 15–8) | Hans Sperre Jr. Trond Wåland |
| 5 | Mike Edstrom; Kevin Han | 0 – 2 (10–15, 10–15) | Tor Egil Kristensen; Erik Lia |

South Africa
5
Kelvin Hall
22 February 1994

Israel
0

| | | Result |
|---|---|---|---|
| 1 | Anton Kriel | 2 – 0 | Amir Moses |
| 2 | Johan Kleingeld | 2 – 0 | Meni Gershon |
| 3 | Alan Phillips | 2 – 0 | Yoni Azran |
| 4 | Anton Kriel; Nico Meerholz | 2 – 0 | Amir Moses; Reuven Moses |
| 5 | Alan Phillips; David Phillips | 2 – 0 | Yoni Azran; Meni Gershon |

==== Group C ====
| Pos | Team | Pld | W | L | MF | MA | MD | Pts | Qualification |
|---|---|---|---|---|---|---|---|---|---|
| 1 | Iceland | 3 | 3 | 0 | 15 | 0 | +15 | 3 | Advance to second round |
| 2 | Bulgaria | 3 | 2 | 1 | 9 | 6 | +3 | 2 | |
| 3 | Spain | 3 | 1 | 2 | 6 | 9 | −3 | 1 | |
| 4 | Barbados | 3 | 0 | 3 | 0 | 15 | −15 | 0 | |
| 5 | Botswana | 0 | 0 | 0 | 0 | 0 | 0 | 0 | Withdrew |

Source: Wolverhampton Express and Star

Iceland
5
Kelvin Hall
20 February 1994

Spain
0

| | | Result |
|---|---|---|---|
| 1 | Broddi Kristjánsson | 2 – 0 (15–7, 15–8) | David Serrano |
| 2 | Þorsteinn Páll Hængsson | 2 – 0 (15–8, 15–11) | Arturo Ruiz |
| 3 | Tryggvi Nielsen | 2 – 1 (9–15, 15–11, 15–11) | Ernesto García |
| 4 | Árni Þór Hallgrímsson; Broddi Kristjánsson | 2 – 0 (15–6, 15–11) | Ernesto García; Arturo Ruiz |
| 5 | Guðmundur Adolfsson; Þorsteinn Páll Hængsson | 2 – 0 (15–1, 15–9) | David Serrano; José Antonio Torres |

Spain
5
Kelvin Hall
20 February 1994

Barbados
0

| | | Result |
|---|---|---|---|
| 1 | Ernesto García | 2 – 0 (15–2, 15–5) | Ryan Holder |
| 2 | Arturo Ruiz | 2 – 0 (15–11, 15–9) | Brian Carter |
| 3 | David Serrano | 2 – 1 (7–15, 15–3, 15–3) | Argyle Maynard |
| 4 | Ernesto García; Arturo Ruiz | 2 – 0 (15–8, 15–8) | Brian Carter; Argyle Maynard |
| 5 | David Serrano; José Antonio Torres | 2 – 0 (15–3, 15–2) | Connel Hinds; Ryan Holder |

Iceland
5
Kelvin Hall
21 February 1994

Barbados
0

| | | Result |
|---|---|---|---|
| 1 | Þorsteinn Páll Hængsson | 2 – 0 (15–11, 15–7) | Argyle Maynard |
| 2 | Tryggvi Nielsen | 2 – 0 (15–7, 15–4) | Alan Alexander |
| 3 | Guðmundur Adolfsson | 2 – 0 (15–1, 15–1) | Brian Carter |
| 4 | Árni Þór Hallgrímsson; Broddi Kristjánsson | 2 – 0 (15–7, 15–8) | Alan Alexander; Argyle Maynard |
| 5 | Guðmundur Adolfsson; Tryggvi Nielsen | 2 – 0 (15–1, 15–0) | Connel Hinds; Ryan Holder |

Bulgaria
5
Kelvin Hall
21 February 1994

Barbados
0

| | | Result |
|---|---|---|---|
| 1 | Todor Velkov | 2 – 0 | Argyle Maynard |
| 2 | Mihail Popov | 2 – 0 | Alan Alexander |
| 3 | Boris Kesov | 2 – 0 | Brian Carter |
| 4 | Mihail Popov; Svetoslav Stoyanov | 2 – 0 | Alan Alexander; Argyle Maynard |
| 5 | Boris Kesov; Todor Velkov | 2 – 0 | Connel Hinds; Ryan Holder |

Iceland
5
Kelvin Hall
22 February 1994

Bulgaria
0

| | | Result |
|---|---|---|---|
| 1 | Broddi Kristjánsson | 2 – 0 (15–3, 15–8) | Plamen Peev |
| 2 | Þorsteinn Páll Hængsson | 2 – 0 (15–6, 15–12) | Todor Velkov |
| 3 | Tryggvi Nielsen | 2 – 0 (15–6, 15–10) | Mihail Popov |
| 4 | Árni Þór Hallgrímsson; Broddi Kristjánsson | 2 – 0 (15–5, 15–5) | Mihail Popov; Svetoslav Stoyanov |
| 5 | Guðmundur Adolfsson; Þorsteinn Páll Hængsson | 2 – 0 (17–16, 18–14) | Boris Kesov; Todor Velkov |

Bulgaria
4
Kelvin Hall
22 February 1994

Spain
1

| | | Result |
|---|---|---|---|
| 1 | Plamen Peev | 0 – 2 | David Serrano |
| 2 | Todor Velkov | 2 – 0 | Arturo Ruiz |
| 3 | Mihail Popov | 2 – 1 | Ernesto García |
| 4 | Mihail Popov; Svetoslav Stoyanov | 2 – 0 | Ernesto García; Arturo Ruiz |
| 5 | Boris Kesov; Todor Velkov | 2 – 0 | David Serrano; José Antonio Torres |

==== Group D ====
| Pos | Team | Pld | W | L | MF | MA | MD | Pts | Qualification |
|---|---|---|---|---|---|---|---|---|---|
| 1 | Austria | 3 | 3 | 0 | 15 | 0 | +15 | 3 | Advance to second round |
| 2 | France | 3 | 2 | 1 | 9 | 6 | +3 | 2 | |
| 3 | Belgium | 3 | 1 | 2 | 6 | 9 | −3 | 1 | |
| 4 | Cyprus | 3 | 0 | 3 | 0 | 15 | −15 | 0 | |
| 5 | Turkey | 0 | 0 | 0 | 0 | 0 | 0 | 0 | Withdrew |

Source: Wolverhampton Express and Star

Austria
5
Kelvin Hall
20 February 1994

Cyprus
0

| | | Result |
|---|---|---|---|
| 1 | Hannes Fuchs | 2 – 0 | Nicolas Pissis |
| 2 | Peter Kreulitsch | 2 – 0 | Tasos Zevlaris |
| 3 | Heimo Götschl | 2 – 0 | Antonis Lazarou |
| 4 | Heimo Götschl; Harald Koch | 2 – 0 | Nicolas Pissis; Tasos Zevlaris |
| 5 | Hannes Fuchs; Peter Kreulitsch | 2 – 0 | Antonis Lazarou; Evandros Votsis |

France
4
Kelvin Hall
20 February 1994

Belgium
1

| | | Result |
|---|---|---|---|
| 1 | Etienne Thobois | 1 – 2 | Pedro Vanneste |
| 2 | Jean-Frédéric Massias | 2 – 0 | Yves de Negri |
| 3 | Franck Panel | 2 – 1 | Jim van Bouwel |
| 4 | Jean-Frédéric Massias; Etienne Thobois | 2 – 1 | Yves de Negri; Filip Vigneron |
| 5 | Manuel Dubrulle; Franck Panel | 2 – 1 | Pedro Vanneste; Jim van Bouwel |

Austria
5
Kelvin Hall
21 February 1994

Belgium
0

| | | Result |
|---|---|---|---|
| 1 | Hannes Fuchs | 2 – 1 | Pedro Vanneste |
| 2 | Peter Kreulitsch | 2 – 1 | Yves de Negri |
| 3 | Heimo Götschl | 2 – 0 | Filip Vigneron |
| 4 | Heimo Götschl; Harald Koch | 2 – 0 | Yves de Negri; Filip Vigneron |
| 5 | Hannes Fuchs; Peter Kreulitsch | 2 – 0 | Jim van Bouwel; Pedro Vanneste |

France
5
Kelvin Hall
21 February 1994

Cyprus
0

| | | Result |
|---|---|---|---|
| 1 | Etienne Thobois | 2 – 0 | Nicolas Pissis |
| 2 | Jean-Frédéric Massias | 2 – 0 | Tasos Zevlaris |
| 3 | Franck Panel | 2 – 0 | Antonis Lazarou |
| 4 | Jean-Frédéric Massias; Etienne Thobois | 2 – 0 | Nicolas Pissis; Tasos Zevlaris |
| 5 | Manuel Dubrulle; Franck Panel | 2 – 0 | Antonis Lazarou; Evandros Votsis |

Austria
5
Kelvin Hall
22 February 1994

France
0

| | | Result |
|---|---|---|---|
| 1 | Hannes Fuchs | 2 – 1 | Etienne Thobois |
| 2 | Heimo Götschl | 2 – 1 | Jean-Frédéric Massias |
| 3 | Jürgen Koch | 2 – 1 | Franck Panel |
| 4 | Heimo Götschl; Harald Koch | 2 – 0 | Jean-Frédéric Massias; Etienne Thobois |
| 5 | Hannes Fuchs; Jürgen Koch | 2 – 1 | Manuel Dubrulle; Franck Panel |

Belgium
5
Kelvin Hall
22 February 1994

Cyprus
0

| | | Result |
|---|---|---|---|
| 1 | Pedro Vanneste | 2 – 0 | Nicolas Pissis |
| 2 | Yves de Negri | 2 – 0 | Tasos Zevlaris |
| 3 | Filip Vigneron | 2 – 0 | Antonis Lazarou |
| 4 | Yves de Negri; Filip Vigneron | 2 – 0 | Nicolas Pissis; Tasos Zevlaris |
| 5 | Jim van Bouwel; Pedro Vanneste | 2 – 0 | Antonis Lazarou; Evandros Votsis |

==== Group E ====
| Pos | Team | Pld | W | L | MF | MA | MD | Pts | Qualification |
|---|---|---|---|---|---|---|---|---|---|
| 1 | Poland | 3 | 3 | 0 | 14 | 1 | +13 | 3 | Advance to second round |
| 2 | Portugal | 3 | 2 | 1 | 11 | 4 | +7 | 2 | |
| 3 | Guatemala | 3 | 1 | 2 | 3 | 12 | −9 | 1 | |
| 4 | Slovakia | 3 | 0 | 3 | 2 | 13 | −11 | 0 | |

Source: Wolverhampton Express and Star

Poland
5
Kelvin Hall
21 February 1994

Guatemala
0

| | | Result |
|---|---|---|---|
| 1 | Jacek Hankiewicz | 2 – 0 | Kenneth Erichsen |
| 2 | Dariusz Zięba | 2 – 0 | Moises Altalef |
| 3 | Damian Pławecki | 2 – 1 | Raúl Martínez |
| 4 | Jacek Hankiewicz; Dariusz Zięba | 2 – 0 | Moises Altalef; Raúl Martínez |
| 5 | Robert Mateusiak; Damian Pławecki | 2 – 0 | Kenneth Erichsen; Renato Rosales |

Portugal
5
Kelvin Hall
21 February 1994

Slovakia
0

| | | Result |
|---|---|---|---|
| 1 | Ricardo Fernandes | 2 – 0 | Juraj Brestovský |
| 2 | Fernando Silva | 2 – 0 | Igor Novák |
| 3 | Antonio Lopes | 2 – 0 | Peter Púdela |
| 4 | Ricardo Fernandes; Fernando Silva | 2 – 0 | Juraj Brestovský; Igor Novák |
| 5 | Hugo Rodrigues; Marco Vasconcelos | 2 – 0 | Róbert Cyprian; Peter Púdela |

Poland
5
Kelvin Hall
22 February 1994

Slovakia
0

| | | Result |
|---|---|---|---|
| 1 | Dariusz Zięba | 2 – 0 | Juraj Brestovský |
| 2 | Damian Pławecki | 2 – 0 | Igor Novák |
| 3 | Robert Mateusiak | 2 – 0 | Peter Púdela |
| 4 | Jacek Hankiewicz; Dariusz Zięba | 2 – 0 | Juraj Brestovský; Igor Novák |
| 5 | Robert Mateusiak; Damian Pławecki | 2 – 0 | Róbert Cyprian; Peter Púdela |

Portugal
5
Kelvin Hall
22 February 1994

Guatemala
0

| | | Result |
|---|---|---|---|
| 1 | Ricardo Fernandes | 2 – 1 | Kenneth Erichsen |
| 2 | Fernando Silva | 2 – 0 | Moises Altalef |
| 3 | Antonio Lopes | 2 – 1 | Raúl Martínez |
| 4 | Ricardo Fernandes; Fernando Silva | 2 – 0 | Moises Altalef; Raúl Martínez |
| 5 | Hugo Rodrigues; Marco Vasconcelos | 2 – 0 | Kenneth Erichsen; Renato Rosales |

Poland
4
Kelvin Hall
22 February 1994

Portugal
1

| | | Result |
|---|---|---|---|
| 1 | Jacek Hankiewicz | 1 – 2 | Ricardo Fernandes |
| 2 | Dariusz Zięba | 2 – 1 | Fernando Silva |
| 3 | Robert Mateusiak | 2 – 0 | Antonio Lopes |
| 4 | Jacek Hankiewicz; Dariusz Zięba | 2 – 1 | Ricardo Fernandes; Fernando Silva |
| 5 | Robert Mateusiak; Damian Pławecki | 2 – 0 | Hugo Rodrigues; Marco Vasconcelos |

Guatemala
3
Kelvin Hall
22 February 1994

Slovakia
2

| | | Result |
|---|---|---|---|
| 1 | Kenneth Erichsen | 2 – 0 | Juraj Brestovský |
| 2 | Moises Altalef | 1 – 2 | Igor Novák |
| 3 | Raúl Martínez | 2 – 1 | Peter Púdela |
| 4 | Moises Altalef; Raúl Martínez | 2 – 0 | Róbert Cyprian; Peter Púdela |
| 5 | Kenneth Erichsen; Renato Rosales | 1 – 2 | Juraj Brestovský; Igor Novák |

==== Group F ====
| Pos | Team | Pld | W | L | MF | MA | MD | Pts | Qualification |
|---|---|---|---|---|---|---|---|---|---|
| 1 | Switzerland | 3 | 3 | 0 | 13 | 2 | +11 | 3 | Advance to second round |
| 2 | Peru | 3 | 2 | 1 | 9 | 6 | +3 | 2 | |
| 3 | Czech Republic | 3 | 1 | 2 | 8 | 7 | +1 | 1 | |
| 4 | Italy | 3 | 0 | 3 | 0 | 15 | −15 | 0 | |

Source: Wolverhampton Express and Star

Switzerland
4
Kelvin Hall
20 February 1994

Peru
1

| | | Result |
|---|---|---|---|
| 1 | Thomas Wapp | 2 – 1 | Mario Carulla |
| 2 | Rémy Matthey de l'Etang | 1 – 2 | José Iturriaga |
| 3 | Christian Nyffenegger | 2 – 1 | Gustavo Salazar |
| 4 | Christian Nyffenegger; Thomas Wapp | 2 – 1 | Mario Carulla; José Iturriaga |
| 5 | Lawrence Chew; Jorge Rodríguez | 2 – 1 | Gustavo Salazar; Federico Valdez |

Czech Republic
5
Kelvin Hall
20 February 1994

Italy
0

| | | Result |
|---|---|---|---|
| 1 | Tomasz Mendrek | 2 – 0 | Andreas Pichler |
| 2 | Ondřej Lubas | 2 – 1 | Gianmarco La Rosa |
| 3 | Petr Báša | 2 – 0 | Enrico La Rosa |
| 4 | Richard Hobzik; Tomasz Mendrek | 2 – 0 | Enrico La Rosa; Andreas Pichler |
| 5 | Boris Krais; Ondřej Lubas | 2 – 0 | Luigi Izzo; Jochen Pichler |

Switzerland
5
Kelvin Hall
21 February 1994

Italy
0

| | | Result |
|---|---|---|---|
| 1 | Thomas Wapp | 2 – 0 | Andreas Pichler |
| 2 | Rémy Matthey de l'Etang | 2 – 1 | Gianmarco La Rosa |
| 3 | Christian Nyffenegger | 2 – 0 | Enrico La Rosa |
| 4 | Christian Nyffenegger; Thomas Wapp | 2 – 0 | Enrico La Rosa; Andreas Pichler |
| 5 | Lawrence Chew; Jorge Rodríguez | 2 – 0 | Luigi Izzo; Jochen Pichler |

Czech Republic
2
Kelvin Hall
21 February 1994

Peru
3

| | | Result |
|---|---|---|---|
| 1 | Tomasz Mendrek | 1 – 2 | Mario Carulla |
| 2 | Ondřej Lubas | 1 – 2 | José Iturriaga |
| 3 | Petr Báša | 2 – 1 | Gustavo Salazar |
| 4 | Richard Hobzik; Tomasz Mendrek | 2 – 1 | Gustavo Salazar; Federico Valdez |
| 5 | Boris Krais; Ondřej Lubas | 0 – 2 | Mario Carulla; José Iturriaga |

Switzerland
4
Kelvin Hall
22 February 1994

Czech Republic
1

| | | Result |
|---|---|---|---|
| 1 | Thomas Wapp | 2 – 0 | Tomasz Mendrek |
| 2 | Rémy Matthey de l'Etang | 1 – 2 | Petr Báša |
| 3 | Christian Nyffenegger | 2 – 0 | Radek Svoboda |
| 4 | Christian Nyffenegger; Thomas Wapp | 2 – 1 | Richard Hobzik; Tomasz Mendrek |
| 5 | Lawrence Chew; Jorge Rodríguez | 2 – 0 | Boris Krais; Ondřej Lubas |

Peru
5
Kelvin Hall
22 February 1994

Italy
0

| | | Result |
|---|---|---|---|
| 1 | Mario Carulla | 2 – 0 | Andreas Pichler |
| 2 | José Iturriaga | 2 – 0 | Gianmarco La Rosa |
| 3 | Gustavo Salazar | 2 – 0 | Enrico La Rosa |
| 4 | Mario Carulla; José Iturriaga | 2 – 0 | Enrico La Rosa; Andreas Pichler |
| 5 | Gustavo Salazar; Federico Valdez | 2 – 0 | Luigi Izzo; Jochen Pichler |

=== Second round ===
==== Group W ====
| Pos | Team | Pld | W | L | MF | MA | MD | Pts | Qualification |
|---|---|---|---|---|---|---|---|---|---|
| 1 | Denmark | 3 | 3 | 0 | 15 | 0 | +15 | 3 | Advance to knockout stage |
| 2 | Russia | 3 | 2 | 1 | 9 | 6 | +3 | 2 | |
| 3 | Austria | 3 | 1 | 2 | 5 | 10 | −5 | 1 | |
| 4 | Belarus | 3 | 0 | 3 | 1 | 14 | −13 | 0 | |

Source: New Straits Times

Denmark
5
Kelvin Hall
23 February 1994

Belarus
0

| | | Result |
|---|---|---|---|
| 1 | Peter Espersen | 2 – 0 (15–12, 15–2) | Mikhail Korshuk |
| 2 | Michael Søgaard | 2 – 0 (15–1, 15–8) | Vitaliy Shmakov |
| 3 | Søren B. Nielsen | 2 – 0 (15–1, 15–2) | Vyatcheslav Roudnitski |
| 4 | Jon Holst-Christensen; Michael Søgaard | 2 – 0 (15–12, 15–0) | Mikhail Korshuk; Vitaliy Shmakov |
| 5 | Christian Jakobsen; Jim Laugesen | 2 – 0 (15–8, 15–3) | Yuri Gromyko; Vyatcheslav Roudnitski |

Russia
4
Kelvin Hall
23 February 1994

Austria
1

| | | Result |
|---|---|---|---|
| 1 | Andrey Antropov | 1 – 2 | Hannes Fuchs |
| 2 | Alexey Sidorov | 2 – 0 | Peter Kreulitsch |
| 3 | Nikolai Zuyev | 2 – 0 | Heimo Götschl |
| 4 | Andrey Antropov; Nikolai Zuyev | 2 – 0 | Heimo Götschl; Harald Koch |
| 5 | Sergey Melnikov; Alexey Sidorov | 2 – 0 | Hannes Fuchs; Peter Kreulitsch |

Denmark
5
Kelvin Hall
24 February 1994

Austria
0

| | | Result |
|---|---|---|---|
| 1 | Poul-Erik Høyer Larsen | 2 – 0 (15–9, 17–16) | Hannes Fuchs |
| 2 | Peter Espersen | 2 – 0 (15–2, 15–6) | Peter Kreulitsch |
| 3 | Søren B. Nielsen | 2 – 0 (15–4, 15–5) | Heimo Götschl |
| 4 | Jon Holst-Christensen; Michael Søgaard | 2 – 0 (15–5, 15–2) | Heimo Götschl; Harald Koch |
| 5 | Jens Eriksen; Christian Jakobsen | 2 – 0 (15–2, 15–3) | Hannes Fuchs; Peter Kreulitsch |

Russia
5
Kelvin Hall
24 February 1994

Belarus
0

| | | Result |
|---|---|---|---|
| 1 | Andrey Antropov | 2 – 0 | Mikhail Korshuk |
| 2 | Alexey Sidorov | 2 – 1 | Vitaliy Shmakov |
| 3 | Nikolai Zuyev | 2 – 0 | Vyatcheslav Roudnitski |
| 4 | Andrey Antropov; Nikolai Zuyev | 2 – 1 | Mikhail Korshuk; Vitaliy Shmakov |
| 5 | Sergey Melnikov; Alexey Sidorov | 2 – 0 | Yuri Gromyko; Vyatcheslav Roudnitski |

Denmark
5
Kelvin Hall
25 February 1994

Russia
0

| | | Result |
|---|---|---|---|
| 1 | Poul-Erik Høyer Larsen | 2 – 0 (15–9, 15–2) | Andrey Antropov |
| 2 | Peter Espersen | 2 – 0 (15–6, 15–6) | Alexey Sidorov |
| 3 | Søren B. Nielsen | 2 – 0 (15–5, 15–0) | Nikolai Zuyev |
| 4 | Jon Holst-Christensen; Michael Søgaard | 2 – 0 (15–10, 18–13) | Andrey Antropov; Nikolai Zuyev |
| 5 | Jens Eriksen; Christian Jakobsen | 2 – 0 (15–12, 15–7) | Sergey Melnikov; Alexey Sidorov |

Austria
4
Kelvin Hall
25 February 1994

Belarus
1

| | | Result |
|---|---|---|---|
| 1 | Hannes Fuchs | 2 – 1 | Mikhail Korshuk |
| 2 | Peter Kreulitsch | 1 – 2 | Vitaliy Shmakov |
| 3 | Heimo Götschl | 2 – 0 | Vyatcheslav Roudnitski |
| 4 | Heimo Götschl; Harald Koch | 2 – 0 | Mikhail Korshuk; Vitaliy Shmakov |
| 5 | Hannes Fuchs; Peter Kreulitsch | 2 – 1 | Yuri Gromyko; Vyatcheslav Roudnitski |

==== Group X ====
| Pos | Team | Pld | W | L | MF | MA | MD | Pts | Qualification |
|---|---|---|---|---|---|---|---|---|---|
| 1 | Finland | 3 | 3 | 0 | 11 | 4 | +7 | 3 | Advance to knockout stage |
| 2 | Netherlands | 3 | 2 | 1 | 11 | 4 | +7 | 2 | |
| 3 | Canada | 3 | 1 | 2 | 5 | 10 | −5 | 1 | |
| 4 | Switzerland | 3 | 0 | 3 | 3 | 12 | −9 | 0 | |

Source: New Straits Times

Netherlands
4
Kelvin Hall
23 February 1994

Switzerland
1

| | | Result |
|---|---|---|---|
| 1 | Jeroen van Dijk | 2 – 0 (15–5, 15–1) | Thomas Wapp |
| 2 | Pierre Pelupessy | 2 – 0 (15–5, 15–4) | Rémy Matthey de l'Etang |
| 3 | Ruud Kuijten | 2 – 0 (15–10, 15–9) | Christian Nyffenegger |
| 4 | Ron Michels; Quinten van Dalm | 2 – 0 (15–7, 15–3) | Christian Nyffenegger; Thomas Wapp |
| 5 | Ruud Kuijten; Joris van Soerland | 0 – 2 (10–15, 11–15) | Lawrence Chew; Jorge Rodríguez |

Canada
2
Kelvin Hall
23 February 1994

Finland
3

| | | Result |
|---|---|---|---|
| 1 | Darryl Yung | 1 – 2 | Lasse Lindelöf |
| 2 | Iain Sydie | 0 – 2 | Jyri Aalto |
| 3 | Eric Nilsson | 2 – 1 | Tony Tuominen |
| 4 | Brent Olynyk; Darryl Yung | 2 – 1 | Robert Liljequist; Tony Tuominen |
| 5 | Eric Nilsson; Iain Sydie | 0 – 2 | Lasse Lindelöf; Mikael Segercrantz |

Netherlands
2
Kelvin Hall
24 February 1994

Finland
3

| | | Result |
|---|---|---|---|
| 1 | Jeroen van Dijk | 1 – 1 (15–17, 18–17, 0^{r}–0) | Jyri Aalto |
| 2 | Pierre Pelupessy | 0 – 2 (14–17, 3–15) | Robert Liljequist |
| 3 | Ruud Kuijten | 0 – 2 (8–15, 9–15) | Tony Tuominen |
| 4 | Ron Michels; Quinten van Dalm | 2 – 0 (15–5, 15–4) | Jyri Aalto; Mikael Segercrantz |
| 5 | Ruud Kuijten; Joris van Soerland | 2 – 0 (15–7, 17–14) | Robert Liljequist; Lasse Lindelöf |

Canada
3
Kelvin Hall
24 February 1994

Switzerland
2

| | | Result |
|---|---|---|---|
| 1 | Iain Sydie | 2 – 1 (15–11, 6–15, 15–10) | Thomas Wapp |
| 2 | Darryl Yung | 1 – 2 (15–10, 9–15, 4–15) | Rémy Matthey de l'Etang |
| 3 | Eric Nilsson | 2 – 0 (15–10, 15–10) | Christian Nyffenegger |
| 4 | Brent Olynyk; Darryl Yung | 2 – 1 (10–15, 15–4, 15–12) | Christian Nyffenegger; Thomas Wapp |
| 5 | Eric Nilsson; Iain Sydie | 1 – 2 (8–15, 15–8, 7–15) | Lawrence Chew; Jorge Rodríguez |

Netherlands
5
Kelvin Hall
25 February 1994

Canada
0

| | | Result |
|---|---|---|---|
| 1 | Pierre Pelupessy | 2 – 0 (15–6, 15–2) | Darryl Yung |
| 2 | Ruud Kuijten | 2 – 0 (15–10, 15–12) | Brent Olynyk |
| 3 | Joris van Soerland | 2 – 1 (18–14, 12–15, 15–3) | Eric Nilsson |
| 4 | Ron Michels; Quinten van Dalm | 2 – 0 (15–2, 15–2) | Brent Olynyk; Darryl Yung |
| 5 | Ruud Kuijten; Joris van Soerland | 2 – 0 (15–5, 15–9) | Eric Nilsson; Iain Sydie |

Finland
5
Kelvin Hall
25 February 1994

Switzerland
0

| | | Result |
|---|---|---|---|
| 1 | Jyri Aalto | 2 – 1 (12–15, 15–7, 15–7) | Thomas Wapp |
| 2 | Robert Liljequist | 2 – 0 (15–9, 15–9) | Rémy Matthey de l'Etang |
| 3 | Lasse Lindelöf | 2 – 1 (12–15, 15–9, 15–2) | Christian Nyffenegger |
| 4 | Jyri Aalto; Tony Tuominen | 2 – 0 (17–15, 15–11) | Christian Nyffenegger; Thomas Wapp |
| 5 | Lasse Lindelöf; Mikael Segercrantz | 2 – 0 (18–14, 15–5) | Lawrence Chew; Jorge Rodríguez |

==== Group Y ====
| Pos | Team | Pld | W | L | MF | MA | MD | Pts | Qualification |
|---|---|---|---|---|---|---|---|---|---|
| 1 | England | 3 | 3 | 0 | 15 | 0 | +15 | 3 | Advance to knockout stage |
| 2 | Scotland | 3 | 2 | 1 | 9 | 6 | +3 | 2 | |
| 3 | Poland | 3 | 1 | 2 | 4 | 11 | −7 | 1 | |
| 4 | Iceland | 3 | 0 | 3 | 2 | 13 | −11 | 0 | |

Source: New Straits Times

England
5
Kelvin Hall
23 February 1994

Poland
0

| | | Result |
|---|---|---|---|
| 1 | Darren Hall | 2 – 0 (15–3, 15–2) | Jacek Hankiewicz |
| 2 | Anders Nielsen | 2 – 0 (17–14, 15–11) | Dariusz Zięba |
| 3 | Peter Knowles | 2 – 0 (15–7, 15–4) | Robert Mateusiak |
| 4 | Michael Adams; Simon Archer | 2 – 0 (15–5, 15–12) | Jacek Hankiewicz; Dariusz Zięba |
| 5 | Chris Hunt; Julian Robertson | 2 – 0 (15–7, 15–9) | Robert Mateusiak; Damian Pławecki |

Scotland
5
Kelvin Hall
23 February 1994

Iceland
0

| | | Result |
|---|---|---|---|
| 1 | David Gilmour | 2 – 0 (18–16, 15–9) | Broddi Kristjánsson |
| 2 | Bruce Flockhart | 2 – 0 (15–4, 18–16) | Þorsteinn Páll Hængsson |
| 3 | Jim Mailer | 2 – 0 (15–6, 15–5) | Tryggvi Nielsen |
| 4 | Russell Hogg; Kenny Middlemiss | 2 – 0 (18–15, 15–5) | Árni Þór Hallgrímsson; Broddi Kristjánsson |
| 5 | Alastair Gatt; Gordon Haldane | 2 – 0 (15–5, 15–6) | Guðmundur Adolfsson; Þorsteinn Páll Hængsson |

England
5
Kelvin Hall
24 February 1994

Iceland
0

| | | Result |
|---|---|---|---|
| 1 | Darren Hall | 2 – 0 (15–3, 15–4) | Árni Þór Hallgrímsson |
| 2 | Peter Knowles | 2 – 0 (15–4, 18–16) | Tryggvi Nielsen |
| 3 | Steve Butler | 2 – 0 (15–0, 15–4) | Guðmundur Adolfsson |
| 4 | Michael Adams; Simon Archer | 2 – 0 (15–10, 18–16) | Árni Þór Hallgrímsson; Broddi Kristjánsson |
| 5 | Neil Cottrill; Chris Hunt | 2 – 0 (15–4, 15–9) | Guðmundur Adolfsson; Þorsteinn Páll Hængsson |

Scotland
4
Kelvin Hall
24 February 1994

Poland
1

| | | Result |
|---|---|---|---|
| 1 | David Gilmour | 2 – 1 (9–15, 17–14, 15–11) | Jacek Hankiewicz |
| 2 | Bruce Flockhart | 1 – 1 (15–12, 5–15, 0^{r}–0) | Dariusz Zięba |
| 3 | Jim Mailer | 2 – 0 (15–3, 15–5) | Damian Pławecki |
| 4 | Russell Hogg; Kenny Middlemiss | 2 – 0 (15–11, 15–7) | Jacek Hankiewicz; Dariusz Zięba |
| 5 | Alastair Gatt; Gordon Haldane | 2 – 0 (17–14, 15–12) | Robert Mateusiak; Damian Pławecki |

England
5
Kelvin Hall
25 February 1994

Scotland
0

| | | Result |
|---|---|---|---|
| 1 | Darren Hall | 2 – 0 (15–10, 15–8) | David Gilmour |
| 2 | Anders Nielsen | 2 – 0 (15–7, 15–6) | Bruce Flockhart |
| 3 | Steve Butler | 2 – 0 (15–1, 15–3) | Jim Mailer |
| 4 | Michael Adams; Simon Archer | 2 – 1 (12–15, 18–15, 15–4) | Russell Hogg; Kenny Middlemiss |
| 5 | Chris Hunt; Julian Robertson | 2 – 0 (15–11, 15–4) | Alastair Gatt; Gordon Haldane |

Iceland
2
Kelvin Hall
25 February 1994

Poland
3

| | | Result |
|---|---|---|---|
| 1 | Broddi Kristjánsson | 1 – 2 | Jacek Hankiewicz |
| 2 | Þorsteinn Páll Hængsson | 1 – 2 | Dariusz Zięba |
| 3 | Tryggvi Nielsen | 2 – 0 | Damian Pławecki |
| 4 | Árni Þór Hallgrímsson; Broddi Kristjánsson | 0 – 2 | Jacek Hankiewicz; Dariusz Zięba |
| 5 | Guðmundur Adolfsson; Þorsteinn Páll Hængsson | 2 – 0 | Robert Mateusiak; Damian Pławecki |

==== Group Z ====
| Pos | Team | Pld | W | L | MF | MA | MD | Pts | Qualification |
|---|---|---|---|---|---|---|---|---|---|
| 1 | Sweden | 3 | 3 | 0 | 14 | 1 | +13 | 3 | Advance to knockout stage |
| 2 | Germany | 3 | 2 | 1 | 9 | 6 | +3 | 2 | |
| 3 | Norway | 3 | 1 | 2 | 4 | 11 | −7 | 1 | |
| 4 | New Zealand | 3 | 0 | 3 | 3 | 12 | −9 | 0 | |

Source: New Straits Times

Sweden
4
Kelvin Hall
23 February 1994

Norway
1

| | | Result |
|---|---|---|---|
| 1 | Jens Olsson | 2 – 0 (15–12, 15–5) | Hans Sperre Jr. |
| 2 | Tomas Johansson | 0 – 2 (10–15, 14–17) | Erik Lia |
| 3 | Patrik Andreasson | 2 – 0 (15–3, 15–2) | Øystein Larsen |
| 4 | Peter Axelsson; Pär-Gunnar Jönsson | 2 – 0 (15–9, 15–12) | Hans Sperre Jr. Trond Wåland |
| 5 | Jan-Eric Antonsson; Mikael Rosén | 2 – 0 (15–7, 15–10) | Tor Egil Kristensen; Erik Lia |

Germany
4
Kelvin Hall
23 February 1994

New Zealand
1

| | | Result |
|---|---|---|---|
| 1 | Oliver Pongratz | 2 – 0 (15–10, 15–11) | Dean Galt |
| 2 | Detlef Poste | 0 – 2 (11–15, 14–17) | Nick Hall |
| 3 | Thomas Berger | 2 – 0 (15–11, 15–12) | Grant Walker |
| 4 | Michael Keck; Stephan Kuhl | 2 – 1 (17–14, 16–17, 18–15) | Dean Galt; Nick Hall |
| 5 | Kai Mitteldorf; Uwe Ossenbrink | 2 – 0 (15–6, 15–7) | Greig Bramwell; Grant Walker |

Sweden
5
Kelvin Hall
24 February 1994

New Zealand
0

| | | Result |
|---|---|---|---|
| 1 | Jens Olsson | 2 – 0 (15–5, 15–4) | Grant Walker |
| 2 | Rickard Magnusson | 2 – 0 (15–9, 15–10) | Greig Bramwell |
| 3 | Patrik Andreasson | 2 – 0 (15–2, 15–0) | Jarrod King |
| 4 | Peter Axelsson; Pär-Gunnar Jönsson | 2 – 0 (15–3, 15–10) | Dean Galt; Nick Hall |
| 5 | Jan-Eric Antonsson; Mikael Rosén | 2 – 0 (15–4, 15–10) | Greig Bramwell; Grant Walker |

Germany
5
Kelvin Hall
24 February 1994

Norway
0

| | | Result |
|---|---|---|---|
| 1 | Oliver Pongratz | 2 – 1 (13–18, 15–7, 15–4) | Erik Lia |
| 2 | Detlef Poste | 2 – 0 (15–12, 15–1) | Tor Egil Kristensen |
| 3 | Thomas Berger | 2 – 0 (15–9, 15–12) | Øystein Larsen |
| 4 | Kai Mitteldorf; Uwe Ossenbrink | 2 – 0 (15–8, 15–6) | Erik Lia; Hans Sperre Jr. |
| 5 | Michael Helber; Markus Keck | 2 – 1 (15–2, 8–15, 17–14) | Jim Ronny Andersen; Trond Wåland |

Sweden
5
Kelvin Hall
25 February 1994

Germany
0

| | | Result |
|---|---|---|---|
| 1 | Jens Olsson | 2 – 1 (15–8, 12–15, 15–10) | Oliver Pongratz |
| 2 | Tomas Johansson | 2 – 0 (15–5, 15–3) | Detlef Poste |
| 3 | Henrik Bengtsson | 2 – 0 (17–14, 15–4) | Markus Keck |
| 4 | Peter Axelsson; Pär-Gunnar Jönsson | 2 – 0 (15–10, 15–10) | Michael Keck; Stephan Kuhl |
| 5 | Jan-Eric Antonsson; Mikael Rosén | 2 – 1 (8–15, 15–1, 15–9) | Kai Mitteldorf; Uwe Ossenbrink |

Norway
3
Kelvin Hall
25 February 1994

New Zealand
2

| | | Result |
|---|---|---|---|
| 1 | Hans Sperre Jr. | 2 – 1 | Grant Walker |
| 2 | Erik Lia | 1 – 2 | Greig Bramwell |
| 3 | Øystein Larsen | 2 – 0 | Jarrod King |
| 4 | Erik Lia; Hans Sperre Jr. | 1 – 2 | Dean Galt; Nick Hall |
| 5 | Jim Ronny Andersen; Trond Wåland | 2 – 0 | Greig Bramwell; Grant Walker |

=== Knockout stage ===
Semi-finals
Denmark | 4
Finland | 1
England | 2
Sweden | 3

Final
Denmark | 4
Sweden | 1
Third place
Finland | 3
England | 2

==== Semi-finals ====
Denmark
4
Kelvin Hall
26 February 1994

Finland
1

| | | Result |
|---|---|---|---|
| 1 | Poul-Erik Høyer Larsen | 2 – 1 (15–5, 6–15, 15–7) | Robert Liljequist |
| 2 | Michael Søgaard | 1 – 2 (14–17, 15–1, 12–15) | Lasse Lindelöf |
| 3 | Søren B. Nielsen | 2 – 0 (15–11, 17–14) | Tony Tuominen |
| 4 | Jens Eriksen; Christian Jakobsen | 2 – 0 (15–8, 15–4) | Jyri Aalto; Tony Tuominen |
| 5 | Jon Holst-Christensen; Jim Laugesen | 2 – 0 (15–3, 15–4) | Lasse Lindelöf; Mikael Segercrantz |

Sweden
3
Kelvin Hall
26 February 1994

England
2

| | | Result |
|---|---|---|---|
| 1 | Jens Olsson | 2 – 0 (15–3, 15–7) | Darren Hall |
| 2 | Tomas Johansson | 2 – 0 (15–6, 15–11) | Anders Nielsen |
| 3 | Patrik Andreasson | 1 – 2 (15–10, 11–15, 15–17) | Peter Knowles |
| 4 | Peter Axelsson; Pär-Gunnar Jönsson | 2 – 0 (15–10, 15–12) | Michael Adams; Simon Archer |
| 5 | Jan-Eric Antonsson; Mikael Rosén | 0 – 2 (11–15, 8–15) | Chris Hunt; Julian Robertson |

==== Third place ====
England
2
Kelvin Hall
27 February 1994

Finland
3

| | | Result |
|---|---|---|---|
| 1 | Anders Nielsen | 0 – 2 (8–15, 13–15) | Pontus Jäntti |
| 2 | Peter Knowles | 0 – 2 (3–15, 6–15) | Jyri Aalto |
| 3 | Steve Butler | 0 – 2 (3–15, 13–15) | Robert Liljequist |
| 4 | Michael Adams; Simon Archer | 2 – 0 (15–4, 15–5) | Pontus Jäntti; Lasse Lindelöf |
| 5 | Chris Hunt; Julian Robertson | 2 – 0 (15–5, 15–3) | Jyri Aalto; Tony Tuominen |

==== Final ====
Denmark
4
Kelvin Hall
27 February 1994

Sweden
1

| | | Result |
|---|---|---|---|
| 1 | Poul-Erik Høyer Larsen | 2 – 0 (15–13, 15–12) | Jens Olsson |
| 2 | Peter Espersen | 2 – 0 (15–13, 15–12) | Tomas Johansson |
| 3 | Søren B. Nielsen | 2 – 0 (15–5, 15–4) | Henrik Bengtsson |
| 4 | Jon Holst-Christensen; Michael Søgaard | 0 – 2 (14–17, 13–18) | Peter Axelsson; Pär-Gunnar Jönsson |
| 5 | Jens Eriksen; Christian Jakobsen | 2 – 0 (15–5, 15–10) | Jan-Eric Antonsson; Mikael Rosén |
