= 1993 IBF World Championships – Men's singles =

Badminton championships

Men's singles at the 1993 IBF World Championships
- Venue: National Indoor Arena
- Location: Birmingham, England
- Dates: May 31, 1993 – June 6, 1993

Medalists
gold medal	Joko Suprianto	Indonesia
silver medal	Hermawan Susanto	Indonesia
bronze medal	Thomas Stuer-Lauridsen	Denmark
bronze medal	Ardy Wiranata	Indonesia

The 8th IBF World Championships (World Badminton Championships) were held in Birmingham, England in 1993. Following the results of the men's singles.

== Main stage ==
=== Section 1 ===
First round
(Indonesia) Joko Suprianto	15	15
(Wales) Geraint Lewis	6	2
(New Zealand) Dean Galt	15	15
(Bulgaria) Svetoslav Stoyanov	3	3
(Netherlands) Pierre Pelupessy	15	15
(Cyprus) Nicolas Pissis	1	3
(Sweden) Patrik Andreasson	15	15
(Mexico) Fernando de la Torre	3	5
(Norway) Erik Lia	3	15	15
(Denmark) Kenneth Jonassen	15	7	10
(Scotland) Jim Mailer	15	15
(Iran) Mansour Shakoori	3	3
(Russia) Pavel Uvarov	8	15'	15'
(Hungary) Richárd Bánhidi	15'	11	5
(South Korea) Lee Gwang-jin	15	15
(Thailand) Kasemsak Chatujinda	11	4

Second round
(Indonesia) Joko Suprianto	15	15
(New Zealand) Dean Galt	2	3
(Netherlands) Pierre Pelupessy	18	15
(Sweden) Patrik Andreasson	13	3
(Norway) Erik Lia	9	15	18
(Scotland) Jim Mailer	13	13
(Russia) Pavel Uvarov	15	15
(South Korea) Lee Gwang-jin	12	11

Third round
(Indonesia) Joko Suprianto	15	15
(Netherlands) Pierre Pelupessy	4	5
(Norway) Erik Lia	10	15	15
(Russia) Pavel Uvarov	15	6	9

Fourth round
(Indonesia) Joko Suprianto	15	15
(Norway) Erik Lia	1	3

=== Section 2 ===
First round
(China) Wu Wenkai	15	15
(Germany) Michael Helber	4	2
(Pakistan) Mohammed Saqib Majeed	w.o.
(Malaysia) Yong Hock Kin
(Malaysia) Wong Wai Lap	w.o.
(Nigeria) Agarawu Tunde
(Hong Kong) He Tim	15	12	15
(Japan) Fumihiko Machida	12	15	4
(Denmark) Poul-Erik Høyer Larsen	15	15
(Iran) Ali Reza Shafiee	1	1
(Finland) Pontus Jäntti	15	15
(Czech Republic) Daniel Gaspar	5	2
(England) Peter Knowles	15	15
(Slovakia) Juraj Brestovský	0	1
(India) George Thomas	15	15
(Poland) Dariusz Karczmarczyk	9	9

Second round
(China) Wu Wenkai	15	15
(Pakistan) Mohammed Saqib Majeed	7	7
(Malaysia) Wong Wai Lap	5	18	18
(Hong Kong) He Tim	15	13	13
(Denmark) Poul-Erik Høyer Larsen	8	15	15
(Finland) Pontus Jäntti	15	6	6
(England) Peter Knowles	15	15
(India) George Thomas	7	9

Third round
(China) Wu Wenkai	15	15
(Malaysia) Wong Wai Lap	6	6
(Denmark) Poul-Erik Høyer Larsen	15	15
(England) Peter Knowles	10	3

Fourth round
(China) Wu Wenkai	15	15
(Denmark) Poul-Erik Høyer Larsen	8	6

=== Section 3 ===
First round
(Indonesia) Ardy Wiranata	15	15
(Kenya) Satish Narasimhan	2	1
(Peru) Mario Carulla	15	15
(Bulgaria) Plamen Dimitrov	2	6
(China) Pan Teng	15	15
(Switzerland) Christian Nyffenegger	7	8
(England) Peter A. Smith	15	15
(Iran) Hameed Nasimi	1	2
(South Korea) Park Sung-woo	15	15
(Scotland) Bruce Flockhart	4	7
(Austria) Jürgen Koch	15	15
(Poland) Dariusz Zięba	5	13
(Netherlands) Chris Bruil	15	15
(Denmark) Peter Espersen	8	5
(France) Etienne Thobois	15	15
(Belgium) Yves de Negri	9	7

Second round
(Indonesia) Ardy Wiranata	15	15
(Peru) Mario Carulla	4	3
(China) Pan Teng	15	15
(England) Peter A. Smith	12	3
(South Korea) Park Sung-woo	15	15
(Austria) Jürgen Koch	2	10
(Netherlands) Chris Bruil	15	15
(France) Etienne Thobois	5	6

Third round
(Indonesia) Ardy Wiranata	15	15
(China) Pan Teng	7	11
(South Korea) Park Sung-woo	12	15	15
(Netherlands) Chris Bruil	15	9	2

Fourth round
(Indonesia) Ardy Wiranata	17	15
(South Korea) Park Sung-woo	16	1

=== Section 4 ===
First round
(Chinese Taipei) Fung Permadi	15	15
(United States) Chong Weng Kai	1	4
(Mexico) Bernardo Monreal	11	15	15
(Bulgaria) Mihail Popov	15	8	2
(England) Anders Nielsen	15	15
(Iceland) Broddi Kristjánsson	10	7
(Australia) Paul Stevenson	w.o.
(Wales) John Leung
(Malaysia) Rashid Sidek	w.o.
(Kazakhstan) Igor Dmitriev
(Ukraine) Sergej Repka	15	15
(Malta) Aldo Polidano	8	0
(China) Dong Jiong	18	15
(Germany) Oliver Pongratz	14	7
(Sweden) Rikard Magnusson	18	11	15
(Japan) Yasumasa Tsujita	14	15	13

Second round
(Chinese Taipei) Fung Permadi	15	15
(Mexico) Bernardo Monreal	2	4
(England) Anders Nielsen	15	15
(Australia) Paul Stevenson	3	7
(Malaysia) Rashid Sidek	15	15
(Ukraine) Sergej Repka	3	2
(China) Dong Jiong	6	15	15
(Sweden) Rikard Magnusson	15	10	12

Third round
(Chinese Taipei) Fung Permadi	15	15
(England) Anders Nielsen	9	10
(Malaysia) Rashid Sidek	15	15
(China) Dong Jiong	11	8

Fourth round
(Chinese Taipei) Fung Permadi	15	10	15
(Malaysia) Rashid Sidek	10	15	6

=== Section 5 ===
First round
(Indonesia) Hermawan Susanto	15	15
(Poland) Jacek Hankiewicz	6	6
(Belarus) Vitali Shmakov	15	15
(Belgium) Filip Vigneron	3	0
(China) Wan Zhengwen	15	15
(Japan) Hideaki Motoyama	10	7
(India) Pullela Gopichand	15	15
(Mexico) Luis Lopezllera	7	3
(Thailand) Sompol Kukasemkij	15	15
(Finland) Jari Eriksson	3	1
(Austria) Hannes Fuchs	15	15
(Switzerland) Thomas Wapp	4	1
(England) Darren Hall	15'	15'
(Mozambique) Serpa Pinto Horacio	1	1
(Iceland) Árni Þór Hallgrímsson	15	15
(Slovakia) Igor Novak	9	5

Second round
(Indonesia) Hermawan Susanto	15	15
(Belarus) Vitali Shmakov	11	1
(China) Wan Zhengwen	18	15
(India) Pullela Gopichand	5	6
(Thailand) Sompol Kukasemkij	9	15	15
(Austria) Hannes Fuchs	5	2
(England) Darren Hall	15	15
(Iceland) Árni Þór Hallgrímsson	5	5

Third round
(Indonesia) Hermawan Susanto	15	15
(China) Wan Zhengwen	7	6
(Thailand) Sompol Kukasemkij	5	18	15
(England) Darren Hall	15	15	4

Fourth round
(Indonesia) Hermawan Susanto	15	15
(Thailand) Sompol Kukasemkij	9	6

=== Section 6 ===
First round
(Sweden) Jens Olsson	15	15
(Hong Kong) Chan Kin Ngai	12	9
(Canada) Bryan Blanshard	15	15
(Wales) Steven Yates	6	4
(South Korea) Kim Hak-kyun	15	15
(China) Xie Yangchun	10	12
(Norway) Hans Sperre jr.	w.o.
(Scotland) Craig Robertson	4	6
(Indonesia) Heryanto Arbi	w.o.
(Ukraine) Leonid Pugach
(United States) Ignatius Rusli	15	15
(Russia) Evgenij Nazarenko	3	3
(Malaysia) Ong Ewe Hock	12	15	15
(England) Peter Bush	15	5	8
(Denmark) Martin Lundgaard Hansen	w.o.
(Nigeria) Adewole Sanyaolu

Second round
(Sweden) Jens Olsson	15	15
(Canada) Bryan Blanshard	10	3
(South Korea) Kim Hak-kyun	15	15
(Norway) Hans Sperre jr.	7	10
(Indonesia) Heryanto Arbi	15	15
(United States) Ignatius Rusli	11	9
(Malaysia) Ong Ewe Hock	15	11	15
(Denmark) Martin Lundgaard Hansen	5	15	11

Third round
(Sweden) Jens Olsson	15	12	15
(South Korea) Kim Hak-kyun	1	15	7
(Indonesia) Heryanto Arbi	12	15	17
(Malaysia) Ong Ewe Hock	15	11	14

Fourth round
(Sweden) Jens Olsson	12	15	17
(Indonesia) Heryanto Arbi	15	11	14

=== Section 7 ===
First round
(Denmark) Thomas Stuer-Lauridsen	w.o.
(Belgium) Pedro Vanneste
(Peru) José Antonio Iturriaga	15	15
(Hungary) Tamas Labodi	4	11
(Finland) Robert Liljequist	15	15
(Cyprus) Evandros Votsis	2	2
(Pakistan) Mirza Ali Yar Beg	15	15
(Scotland) David Gilmour	5	3
(China) Liu Jun	15	15
(Ukraine) Vladislav Druzchenko	7	6
(Lithuania) Aivaras Kvedarauskas	15	15
(Slovenia) Gregor Berden	10	0
(Sweden) Thomas Johansson	15	15
(Portugal) Fernando Silva	1	10
(New Zealand) Kerrin Harrison	w.o.
(Poland) Mariusz Borowiec

Second round
(Denmark) Thomas Stuer-Lauridsen	15	15
(Peru) José Antonio Iturriaga	2	4
(Finland) Robert Liljequist	15	15
(Pakistan) Mirza Ali Yar Beg	4	5
(China) Liu Jun	15	15
(Lithuania) Aivaras Kvedarauskas	7	9
(Sweden) Thomas Johansson	15	15
(New Zealand) Kerrin Harrison	2	6

Third round
(Denmark) Thomas Stuer-Lauridsen	15	15
(Finland) Robert Liljequist	8	3
(China) Liu Jun	10	15	15
(Sweden) Thomas Johansson	15	8	3

Fourth round
(Denmark) Thomas Stuer-Lauridsen	15	15
(China) Liu Jun	9	3

=== Section 8 ===
First round
(Indonesia) Allan Budi Kusuma	15	15
(United States) Paul McAdam	0	3
(Germany) Detlef Poste	15	15
(Mexico) Ernesto de la Torre	5	0
(England) Steve Butler	15	15
(Netherlands) Jeroen van Dijk	5	5
(South Korea) Lee Yong-sun	15	15
(Iran) Bahador Zakizadeh	3	6
(Malaysia) Foo Kok Keong	15	15
(Grenada) Stephenson Sylvester	1	6
(Sweden) Henrik Bengtsson	15	15
(Iceland) Þorsteinn Páll Hængsson	11	3
(Russia) Andreij Antropov	15	15
(Denmark) Peter Rasmussen	8	10
(Belarus) Oleg Morozevich	w.o.
(Nepal) Prakash Doj Rana

Second round
(Indonesia) Allan Budi Kusuma	15	15
(Germany) Detlef Poste	5	10
(England) Steve Butler	15	15
(South Korea) Lee Yong-sun	7	4
(Malaysia) Foo Kok Keong	15	15
(Sweden) Henrik Bengtsson	6	6
(Russia) Andreij Antropov	15	15
(Belarus) Oleg Morozevich	5	5

Third round
(Indonesia) Allan Budi Kusuma	15	15	15
(England) Steve Butler	18	9	0
(Malaysia) Foo Kok Keong	15	15
(Russia) Andreij Antropov	6	13

Fourth round
(Indonesia) Allan Budi Kusuma	15	15
(Malaysia) Foo Kok Keong	10	8

== Final stage ==
Quarterfinals
(Indonesia) Joko Suprianto	18	15
(China) Wu Wenkai	8	5
(Indonesia) Ardy Wiranata	15	15
(Chinese Taipei) Fung Permadi	12	12
(Indonesia) Hermawan Susanto	15	15
(Sweden) Jens Olsson	9	9
(Denmark) Thomas Stuer-Lauridsen	15	15
(Indonesia) Allan Budi Kusuma	3	9

Semifinals
(Indonesia) Joko Suprianto	18	15
(Indonesia) Ardy Wiranata	14	3
(Indonesia) Hermawan Susanto	10	15	15
(Denmark) Thomas Stuer-Lauridsen	15	2	10

Finals
(Indonesia) Joko Suprianto	15	15
(Indonesia) Hermawan Susanto	5	11
