= 1995 IBF World Championships – Men's doubles =

Badminton championships

Men's doubles at the 1995 IBF World Championships
- Venue: Malley Sports Centre
- Location: Lausanne, Switzerland
- Dates: May 22, 1995 – May 28, 1995

Medalists
gold medal	Rexy Mainaky; Ricky Subagja	Indonesia
silver medal	Jon Holst-Christensen; Thomas Lund	Denmark
bronze medal	Cheah Soon Kit; Yap Kim Hock	Malaysia
bronze medal	Kim Dong-moon; Yoo Yong-sung	South Korea

The 1995 IBF World Championships (World Badminton Championships) were held in Lausanne, Switzerland, between 22 May and 28 May 1995. Following the results of the men's doubles.

== Main stage ==
=== Section 1 ===
First round
(Indonesia) Rexy Mainaky (Indonesia) Ricky Subagja
bye
(Iran) Afshin Bozorgzadeh (Iran) Ali Cheraginik
bye
(Australia) Peter Blackburn (Australia) Paul Staight	15	15
(India) Rajeev Bagga (India) Pullela Gopichand	9	9
(Portugal) Ricardo Fernandes (Portugal) Fernando Silva	15	15
(France) David Cocagne (France) Etienne Thobois	9	3
(Denmark) Michael Søgaard (Denmark) Henrik Svarrer
bye
(Iceland) Árni Þór Hallgrímsson (Iceland) Broddi Kristjánsson
bye
(South Korea) Ha Tae-kwon (South Korea) Kang Kyung-jin	15	15
(Switzerland) Rémy Matthey de l’Etang (Switzerland) Stephan Wapp	4	1
(China) Liang Qing (China) Liu Yong	w.o.
(Scotland) Russell Hogg (Scotland) Kenny Middlemiss

Second round
(Indonesia) Rexy Mainaky (Indonesia) Ricky Subagja	w.o.
(Iran) Afshin Bozorgzadeh (Iran) Ali Cheraginik
(Australia) Peter Blackburn (Australia) Paul Staight	13	15	15
(Portugal) Ricardo Fernandes (Portugal) Fernando Silva	15	7	12
(Denmark) Michael Søgaard (Denmark) Henrik Svarrer	w.o.
(Iceland) Árni Þór Hallgrímsson (Iceland) Broddi Kristjánsson
(South Korea) Ha Tae-kwon (South Korea) Kang Kyung-jin	15	15
(China) Liang Qing (China) Liu Yong	3	6

Third round
(Indonesia) Rexy Mainaky (Indonesia) Ricky Subagja	15	15
(Australia) Peter Blackburn (Australia) Paul Staight	5	11
(Denmark) Michael Søgaard (Denmark) Henrik Svarrer	15	15
(South Korea) Ha Tae-kwon (South Korea) Kang Kyung-jin	12	6

Fourth round
(Indonesia) Rexy Mainaky (Indonesia) Ricky Subagja	15	15
(Denmark) Michael Søgaard (Denmark) Henrik Svarrer	10	3

=== Section 2 ===
First round
(Sweden) Peter Axelsson (Sweden) Pär-Gunnar Jönsson
bye
(Republic of Ireland) Michael O'Meara (Republic of Ireland) Bruce Topping
bye
(Canada) Mike Beres (United States) David Shaw	w.o.
(Argentina) Alejandro Meyer (Argentina) Jorge Meyer
(Wales) John Leung (Wales) Richard Vaughan	18	15
(Bulgaria) Boris Kessov (Bulgaria) Theodoros Velkos	16	13
(Russia) Andrey Antropov (Russia) Nikolaj Zuev
bye
(Malta) Aldo Polidano (Malta) Kenneth Vella
bye
(England) Neil Cottrill (England) John Quinn	15	15
(Spain) Ernesto Garcia (Spain) Arturo Ruiz	3	9
(Chinese Taipei) Lee Sung Yuan (Chinese Taipei) Liao Wei-Chieh	15	15
(Kazakhstan) Igor Dmitriev (Kazakhstan) Anton Tiajkoun	2	2

Second round
(Sweden) Peter Axelsson (Sweden) Pär-Gunnar Jönsson	15	15
(Republic of Ireland) Michael O'Meara (Republic of Ireland) Bruce Topping	5	6
(Canada) Mike Beres (Canada) David Shaw	15	10	18
(Wales) John Leung (Wales) Richard Vaughan	11	15	17
(Russia) Andrey Antropov (Russia) Nikolaj Zuev	w.o.
(Malta) Aldo Polidano (Malta) Kenneth Vella
(England) Neil Cottrill (England) John Quinn	9	15	15
(Chinese Taipei) Lee Sung Yuan (Chinese Taipei) Liao Wei-Chieh	15	10	13

Third round
(Sweden) Peter Axelsson (Sweden) Pär-Gunnar Jönsson	15	15
(Canada) Mike Beres (Canada) David Shaw	0	3
(Russia) Andrey Antropov (Russia) Nikolaj Zuev	10	15	15
(England) Neil Cottrill (England) John Quinn	15	11	9

Fourth round
(Sweden) Peter Axelsson (Sweden) Pär-Gunnar Jönsson	15	11	15
(Russia) Andrey Antropov (Russia) Nikolaj Zuev	9	15	12

=== Section 3 ===
First round
(Malaysia) Cheah Soon Kit (Malaysia) Yap Kim Hock
bye
(China) Liu Di (China) Yang Ming
bye
(England) James Anderson (England) Ian Pearson	7	15	15
(France) Bertrand Gallet (France) Jean-Frederic Massias	15	10	9
(Austria) Heimo Götschl (Austria) Jürgen Koch	8	15	15
(Iceland) Gudmundur Adolfsson (Peru) Gustavo Salazar	15	4	4
(Thailand) Pramote Teerawiwatana (Thailand) Sakrapee Thongsari
bye
(Macau) Lo Ka Lon (Macau) Joaquim Lobo
bye
(Germany) Kai Mitteldorf (Germany) Uwe Ossenbrink	15	15
(Belgium) Luigi Dalli Cardillo (Belgium) Philippe Gennaux	11	3
(South Korea) Lee Dong-soo (South Korea) Lee Yong-sun	15	15
(Nigeria) Danjuma Fatauchi (Nigeria) Agarawu Tunde	3	12

Second round
(Malaysia) Cheah Soon Kit (Malaysia) Yap Kim Hock	15	8	15
(China) Liu Di (China) Yang Ming	7	15	9
(England) James Anderson (England) Ian Pearson	15	18
(Austria) Heimo Götschl (Austria) Jürgen Koch	7	14
(Thailand) Pramote Teerawiwatana (Thailand) Sakrapee Thongsari	15	15
(Macau) Lo Ka Lon (Macau) Joaquim Lobo	1	1
(Germany) Kai Mitteldorf (Germany) Uwe Ossenbrink	15	15
(South Korea) Lee Dong-soo (South Korea) Lee Yong-sun	10	13

Third round
(Malaysia) Cheah Soon Kit (Malaysia) Yap Kim Hock	15	15
(England) James Anderson (England) Ian Pearson	7	6
(Thailand) Pramote Teerawiwatana (Thailand) Sakrapee Thongsari	15	15
(Germany) Kai Mitteldorf (Germany) Uwe Ossenbrink	7	3

Fourth round
(Malaysia) Cheah Soon Kit (Malaysia) Yap Kim Hock	17	17
(Thailand) Pramote Teerawiwatana (Thailand) Sakrapee Thongsari	16	16

=== Section 4 ===
First round
(Indonesia) S. Antonius Budi Ariantho (Indonesia) Denny Kantono
bye
(Poland) Jacek Niedźwiedzki (Poland) Dariusz Zięba
bye
(Canada) Anil Kaul (Canada) Iain Sydie	15	12	15
(Japan) Takaaki Hayashi (Japan) Norio Imai	0	15	12
(New Zealand) Dean Galt (New Zealand) Grant Walker	15	15
(Italy) Andrea Chiappini (Italy) Andreas Pichler	3	2
(Denmark) Jens Eriksen (Denmark) Christian Jakobsen
bye
(Iran) Amir Hoshang Alboeeh (Iran) Morteza Khedmaty
bye
(Hong Kong) Chan Siu Kwong (Hong Kong) He Tim	15	15
(United States) Kevin Han (United States) Thomas Reidy	10	8
(Switzerland) Christian Nyffenegger (Switzerland) Thomas Wapp	15	15
(Slovenia) Simon Hawlina (Slovenia) Andrej Pohar	1	7

Second round
(Indonesia) S. Antonius Budi Ariantho (Indonesia) Denny Kantono	15	15
(Poland) Jacek Niedźwiedzki (Poland) Dariusz Zięba	5	6
(Canada) Anil Kaul (Canada) Iain Sydie	15	15
(New Zealand) Dean Galt (New Zealand) Grant Walker	11	11
(Denmark) Jens Eriksen (Denmark) Christian Jakobsen	w.o.
(Iran) Amir Hoshang Alboeeh (Iran) Morteza Khedmaty
(Hong Kong) Chan Siu Kwong (Hong Kong) He Tim	15	15
(Switzerland) Christian Nyffenegger (Switzerland) Thomas Wapp	10	6

Third round
(Indonesia) S. Antonius Budi Ariantho (Indonesia) Denny Kantono	15	15
(Canada) Anil Kaul (Canada) Iain Sydie	4	5
(Denmark) Jens Eriksen (Denmark) Christian Jakobsen	15	15
(Hong Kong) Chan Siu Kwong (Hong Kong) He Tim	9	5

Fourth round
(Indonesia) S. Antonius Budi Ariantho (Indonesia) Denny Kantono	15	15
(Denmark) Jens Eriksen (Denmark) Christian Jakobsen	8	2

=== Section 5 ===
First round
(Denmark) Jon Holst-Christensen (Denmark) Thomas Lund
bye
(Russia) Evgenij Kovalenko (Russia) Pavel Uvarov
bye
(Scotland) Alastair Gatt (Scotland) Craig Robertson	18	13	15
(Australia) Murray Hocking (Australia) Paul Stevenson	9	15	8
(Scotland) Bruce Flockhart (Republic of Ireland) Eugene McKenna	15	11	15
(Pakistan) Mirza Ali Yar Beg (Pakistan) Islam Amir	10	15	6
(Malaysia) Yap Yee Guan (Malaysia) Yap Yee Hup
bye
(Slovakia) Robert Cyprian (Slovakia) Peter Pudela
bye
(Belarus) Mikhail Korshuk (Belarus) Vitaliy Shmakov	15	15
(Czech Republic) Ondřej Lubas (Czech Republic) Tomasz Mendrek	1	9
(Switzerland) Lawrence Si Hock Chew (Switzerland) Jorge Rodriguez	12	15	18
(Netherlands) Ron Michels (Netherlands) Pierre Pelupessy	15	10	17

Second round
(Denmark) Jon Holst-Christensen (Denmark) Thomas Lund	15	15
(Russia) Evgenij Kovalenko (Russia) Pavel Uvarov	3	8
(Scotland) Alastair Gatt (Scotland) Craig Robertson	15	15	15
(Scotland) Bruce Flockhart (Republic of Ireland) Eugene McKenna	13	6
(Malaysia) Yap Yee Guan (Malaysia) Yap Yee Hup	w.o.
(Slovakia) Robert Cyprian (Slovakia) Peter Pudela
(Belarus) Mikhail Korshuk (Belarus) Vitaliy Shmakov	15	18
(Switzerland) Lawrence Si Hock Chew (Switzerland) Jorge Rodriguez	11	14

Third round
(Denmark) Jon Holst-Christensen (Denmark) Thomas Lund	15	15
(Scotland) Alastair Gatt (Scotland) Craig Robertson	4	1
(Malaysia) Yap Yee Guan (Malaysia) Yap Yee Hup	15	15
(Belarus) Mikhail Korshuk (Belarus) Vitaliy Shmakov	7	7

Fourth round
(Denmark) Jon Holst-Christensen (Denmark) Thomas Lund	15	13	15
(Malaysia) Yap Yee Guan (Malaysia) Yap Yee Hup	9	15	6

=== Section 6 ===
First round
(China) Huang Zhanzhong (China) Jiang Xin
bye
(Canada) Brent Olynyk (Canada) Darryl Yung
bye
(Bulgaria) Mihail Popov (Bulgaria) Svetoslav Stoyanov	15	15
(Slovenia) Ales Babnik (Slovenia) Miso Mattias	7	11
(Mauritius) Stephan Beeharry (Mauritius) Édouard Clarisse	15	15
(Lithuania) Aivaras Kvedarauskas (Lithuania) Dainius Lukosius	2	13
(Germany) Michael Helber (Germany) Michael Keck
bye
(Morocco) Abdelhadi Kella (Morocco) Boumediane Louati
bye
(Japan) Akihiro Imai (Japan) Fumihiko Machida	15	2	15
(Norway) Erik Lia (Norway) Trond Waaland	12	15	6
(New Zealand) Nick Hall (New Zealand) Glenn Stewart	15	15
(Cyprus) Antonis L. Lazarou (Cyprus) Nicolas Pissis	7	3

Second round
(China) Huang Zhanzhong (China) Jiang Xin	15	15
(Canada) Brent Olynyk (Canada) Darryl Yung	9	8
(Bulgaria) Mihail Popov (Bulgaria) Svetoslav Stoyanov	15	15
(Mauritius) Stephan Beeharry (Mauritius) Édouard Clarisse	8	4
(Germany) Michael Helber (Germany) Michael Keck	w.o.
(Morocco) Abdelhadi Kella (Morocco) Boumediane Louati
(Japan) Akihiro Imai (Japan) Fumihiko Machida	15	15	15
(New Zealand) Nick Hall (New Zealand) Glenn Stewart	10	17	12

Third round
(China) Huang Zhanzhong (China) Jiang Xin	15	15
(Bulgaria) Mihail Popov (Bulgaria) Svetoslav Stoyanov	9	2
(Germany) Michael Helber (Germany) Michael Keck	15	15
(Japan) Akihiro Imai (Japan) Fumihiko Machida	2	8

Fourth round
(China) Huang Zhanzhong (China) Jiang Xin	15	15
(Germany) Michael Helber (Germany) Michael Keck	12	8

=== Section 7 ===
First round
(South Korea) Kim Dong-moon (South Korea) Yoo Yong-sung	15	15
(Germany) Detlef Poste (Germany) Björn Siegemund	7	4
(India) Jaseel P. Ismail (India) Vijaydeep Singh	15	15
(Australia) Craig Booley (Australia) Stuart Metcalfe	10	8
(Thailand) Siripong Siripool (Thailand) Khunakorn Sudhisodhi
bye
(England) Simon Archer (England) Chris Hunt
bye
(Finland) Mikael Segercrantz (Finland) Tony Tuominen	15	15
(Sri Lanka) Duminda Jayakody (Sri Lanka) Niroshan Wijekoon	3	4
(Peru) Mario Carulla (Peru) José Antonio Iturriaga	15	15
(Mozambique) Serpa Pinto Horacio (Mozambique) Luis Antonio Timm	2	5
(Poland) Robert Mateusiak (Poland) Damian Pławecki
bye
(Nigeria) Kayode Akinsanya (Nigeria) Wasiu Ogunseye	15	15
(Brazil) Guilherme Kumasaka (Brazil) Leandro Santos	7	4

Second round
(South Korea) Kim Dong-moon (South Korea) Yoo Yong-sung	15	15
(India) Jaseel P. Ismail (India) Vijaydeep Singh	3	4
(Thailand) Siripong Siripool (Thailand) Khunakorn Sudhisodhi	10	18	15
(England) Simon Archer (England) Chris Hunt	15	17	13
(Finland) Mikael Segercrantz (Finland) Tony Tuominen	15	15
(Peru) Mario Carulla (Peru) José Antonio Iturriaga	7	7
(Poland) Robert Mateusiak (Poland) Damian Pławecki	15	15
(Nigeria) Kayode Akinsanya (Nigeria) Wasiu Ogunseye	3	5

Third round
(South Korea) Kim Dong-moon (South Korea) Yoo Yong-sung	10	15	15
(Thailand) Siripong Siripool (Thailand) Khunakorn Sudhisodhi	15	11	5
(Finland) Mikael Segercrantz (Finland) Tony Tuominen	15	15
(Poland) Robert Mateusiak (Poland) Damian Pławecki	13	7

Fourth round
(South Korea) Kim Dong-moon (South Korea) Yoo Yong-sung	15	15
(Finland) Mikael Segercrantz (Finland) Tony Tuominen	7	2

=== Section 8 ===
First round
(Indonesia) Rudy Gunawan (Indonesia) Bambang Suprianto
bye
(Slovenia) Miha Kosnik (Slovenia) Miha Sepec
bye
(Chinese Taipei) Horng Shin-Jeng (Chinese Taipei) Huang Chuan-Chen	15	15
(Belgium) Jim van Bouwel (Belgium) Filip Vigneron	5	4
(Hungary) Gyula Szalai (Hungary) György Vörös	w.o.
(Iran) Amir Hoshang Alboeeh (Iran) Morteza Khedmaty
(Malaysia) Soo Beng Kiang (Malaysia) Tan Kim Her
bye
(Italy) Christian Hinteregger (Italy) Enrico la Rosa
bye
(Ukraine) Valerij Strelcov (Ukraine) Konstantin Tatranov	15	18
(France) Manuel Dubrulle (France) Vincent Laigle	11	13
(Bulgaria) Tzvetozar Kolev (Bulgaria) Plamen Peev	15	15
(Macau) Kai Chong Sam (Macau) Kin Chong Sam	6	11

Second round
(Indonesia) Rudy Gunawan (Indonesia) Bambang Suprianto	15	15
(Slovenia) Miha Kosnik (Slovenia) Miha Sepec	3	4
(Chinese Taipei) Horng Shin-Jeng (Chinese Taipei) Huang Chuan-Chen	15	15
(Hungary) Gyula Szalai (Hungary) György Vörös	5	8
(Malaysia) Soo Beng Kiang (Malaysia) Tan Kim Her	w.o.
(Italy) Christian Hinteregger (Italy) Enrico la Rosa	4	1
(Ukraine) Valerj Strelcov (Ukraine) Konstantin Tatranov	15	15
(Bulgaria) Tzvetozar Kolev (Bulgaria) Plamen Peev	5	8

Third round
(Indonesia) Rudy Gunawan (Indonesia) Bambang Suprianto	15	15
(Chinese Taipei) Horng Shin-Jeng (Chinese Taipei) Huang Chuan-Chen	5	11
(Malaysia) Soo Beng Kiang (Malaysia) Tan Kim Her	15	15
(Ukraine) Valerij Strelcov (Ukraine) Konstantin Tatranov	9	4

Fourth round
(Indonesia) Rudy Gunawan (Indonesia) Bambang Suprianto	15	15
(Malaysia) Soo Beng Kiang (Malaysia) Tan Kim Her	4	7

== Final stage ==
Quarterfinals
(Indonesia) Rexy Mainaky (Indonesia) Ricky Subagja	18	15
(Sweden) Peter Axelsson (Sweden) Pär-Gunnar Jönsson	16	8
(Malaysia) Cheah Soon Kit (Malaysia) Yap Kim Hock	15	15
(Indonesia) S. Antonius Budi Ariantho (Indonesia) Denny Kantono	12	6
(Denmark) Jon Holst-Christensen (Denmark) Thomas Lund	17	15
(China) Huang Zhanzhong (China) Jiang Xin	14	11
(South Korea) Kim Dong-moon (South Korea) Yoo Yong-sung	15	15
(Indonesia) Rudy Gunawan (Indonesia) Bambang Suprianto	9	6

Semifinals
(Indonesia) Rexy Mainaky (Indonesia) Ricky Subagja	15	15
(Malaysia) Cheah Soon Kit (Malaysia) Yap Kim Hock	8	6
(Denmark) Jon Holst-Christensen (Denmark) Thomas Lund	15	15
(South Korea) Kim Dong-moon (South Korea) Yoo Yong-sung	12	2

Finals
(Indonesia) Rexy Mainaky (Indonesia) Ricky Subagja	15	15
(Denmark) Jon Holst-Christensen (Denmark) Thomas Lund	5	2
