= Badminton at the 1996 Summer Olympics – Men's singles =

Badminton at the Olympics

Men's singles at the Games of the XXVI Olympiad
- Venue: Georgia State University Gymnasium
- Date: 24 July – 1 August 1996
- Competitors: 49 from 31 nations

Medalists
1st place, gold medalist(s)		Poul-Erik Høyer Larsen	Denmark
2nd place, silver medalist(s)		Dong Jiong	China
3rd place, bronze medalist(s)		Rashid Sidek	Malaysia

These were the results of men's singles tournament of badminton at the 1996 Summer Olympics. The tournament was single-elimination. Matches consisted of three sets, with sets being to 15 for men's singles. The tournament was held at the Georgia State University Gymnasium.

== Seeds ==
1. Joko Suprianto (INA) (quarterfinals)
2. Poul-Erik Høyer Larsen (DEN) (gold medalist)
3. Dong Jiong (CHN) (silver medalist)
4. Heryanto Arbi (INA) (fourth place)
5. Alan Budikusuma (INA) (quarterfinals)
6. Lee Gwang-jin (KOR) (quarterfinals)
7. Park Sung-woo (KOR) (quarterfinals)
8. Rashid Sidek (MAS) (bronze medalist)

== Draw ==
=== Finals ===
Quarterfinals
1	Joko Suprianto (INA)	5	12
8	Rashid Sidek (MAS)	15	15
3	Dong Jiong (CHN)	15	15
7	Park Sung-woo (KOR)	6	6
6	Lee Gwang-jin (KOR)	0	13
4	Heryanto Arbi (INA)	15	15
5	Alan Budikusuma (INA)	5	9
2	Poul-Erik Høyer Larsen (DEN)	15	15

Semifinals
8	Rashid Sidek (MAS)	6	16
3	Dong Jiong (CHN)	15	18
4	Heryanto Arbi (INA)	11	6
2	Poul-Erik Høyer Larsen (DEN)	15	15

Finals
3	Dong Jiong (CHN)	12	10
2	Poul-Erik Høyer Larsen (DEN)	15	15
Bronze medal match
8	Rashid Sidek (MAS)	5	15	15
4	Heryanto Arbi (INA)	15	11	6

=== Section 1 ===
First round
Kenneth Erichsen (GUA)	12	15	15
Jens Olsson (SWE)	15	6	17
Peter Knowles (GBR)	2	15	15
Kevin Han (USA)	15	10	7
Jaimie Dawson (CAN)	15	15
Oscar Brandon (SUR)	5	4
Yu Lizhi (CHN)	15	12	15
Oliver Pongratz (GER)	5	15	1

Second round
1	Joko Suprianto (INA)	15	15
Pontus Jäntti (FIN)	1	5
Jens Olsson (SWE)	15	15
Peter Knowles (GBR)	11	9
5/8	Rashid Sidek (MAS)	15	15
Andrey Antropov (RUS)	11	7
Jaimie Dawson (CAN)	10	11
Yu Lizhi (CHN)	15	15

Third round
1	Joko Suprianto (INA)	15	15
Jens Olsson (SWE)	11	12
5/8	Rashid Sidek (MAS)	15	15
Yu Lizhi (CHN)	5	2

Quarterfinals
1	Joko Suprianto (INA)
5/8	Rashid Sidek (MAS)

=== Section 2 ===
First round
Kayode Akinsanya (NGR)	2	2
Thomas Stuer-Lauridsen (DEN)	15	15
Hannes Fuchs (AUT)	15	15
Julian Robertson (GBR)	2	6
Fumihiko Machida (JPN)	15	15
Stephan Beehary (MRI)	11	5
Kittipon Kittikul (THA)	15	17
Todor Velkov (BUL)	7	15

Second round
3	Dong Jiong (CHN)	15	15
Joris van Soerland (NED)	9	4
Thomas Stuer-Lauridsen (DEN)	15	15
Hannes Fuchs (AUT)	2	5
5/8	Park Sung-woo (KOR)	15	15
Chang Jeng-shyuang (TPE)	5	3
Fumihiko Machida (JPN)	15	15
Kitipon Kitikul (THA)	7	11

Third round
3	Dong Jiong (CHN)	15	18
Thomas Stuer-Lauridsen (DEN)	6	15
5/8	Park Sung-woo (KOR)	15	15
Fumihiko Machida (JPN)	5	9

Quarterfinals
3	Dong Jiong (CHN)
5/8	Park Sung-woo (KOR)

=== Section 3 ===
First round
Murray Hocking (AUS)	9	9
Iain Sydie (CAN)	15	15
Thomas Wapp (SUI)	15	10	15
Mario Carulla Schultz (PER)	8	15	11
Darren Hall (GBR)	15	15
Ron Michels (NED)	4	4
Liu En-hung (TPE)	15	15
Eddy Clarisse (MRI)	10	2
Michael Helber (GER)	15	15
Mikhail Korshuk (BLR)	12	1

Second round
Iain Sydie (CAN)	15	15
Thomas Wapp (SUI)	7	7
Darren Hall (GBR)	7	11
5/8	Lee Gwang-jin (KOR)	15	15
Liu En-Horng (TPE)	8	15	15
Michael Helber (GER)	15	0	2
Deepankar Bhattacharya (IND)	5	4
4	Heryanto Arbi (INA)	15	15

Third round
Iain Sydie (CAN)	8	12
5/8	Lee Gwang-jin (KOR)	15	15
Liu En-Horng (TPE)	0	7
4	Heryanto Arbi (INA)	15	15

Quarterfinals
5/8	Lee Gwang-jin (KOR)
4	Heryanto Arbi (INA)

=== Section 4 ===
First round
Kim Hak-kyun (KOR)
Anil Kaul (CAN)	wo
Sun Jun (CHN)	15	15
Étienne Thobois (FRA)	5	6
Pavel Uvarov (RUS)	8	10
Jeroen van Dijk (NED)	15	15
Robert Liljequist (FIN)	1	6
Ong Ewe Hock (MAS)	15	15

Second round
Kim Hak-kyun (KOR)	5	14
Sun Jun (CHN)	15	17
Tomas Johansson (SWE)	5	1
5/8	Alan Budikusuma (INA)	15	15
Jeroen van Dijk (NED)	11	10
Ong Ewe Hock (MAS)	15	15
Vladislav Druzchenko (UKR)	7	6
2	Poul-Erik Høyer Larsen (DEN)	15	15

Third round
Sun Jun (CHN)	5	6
5/8	Alan Budikusuma (INA)	15	15
Ong Ewe Hock (MAS)	14	9
2	Poul-Erik Høyer Larsen (DEN)	17	15

Quarterfinals
5/8	Alan Budikusuma (INA)
4	Poul-Erik Høyer Larsen (DEN)

== Sources ==
- Olympic Games 1996 I-Tournament Software
- The Official Report of the Centennial Olympic Games Volume Three ˗ The Competition Results (PDF). p. 110. Archived from the original (PDF) on 27 September 2007.
