= Yu Lizhi =

Chinese badminton player

Yu Lizhi 余立志
Personal information
- Born: 5 January 1969 (age 57) China
- Height: 1.80 m (5 ft 11 in)
- Weight: 70 kg (154 lb)

Sport
- Country: China
- Sport: Badminton

Yu Lizhi (born 5 January 1969) is a Chinese badminton player. He competed in the men's singles tournament at the 1996 Summer Olympics.
