= Richard Vaughan (badminton) =

Welsh badminton player

Personal information
- Nationality: British (Welsh)
- Born: 16 April 1978 (age 48) Caerphilly, Wales
- Height: 1.83 m (6 ft 0 in)
- Weight: 82 kg (181 lb; 12.9 st)

Sport
- Sport: Badminton
- Handedness: Right

Men's singles
- Highest ranking: 7 (2002)
- BWF profile
Medal record
Men's badminton
Representing Wales
Commonwealth Games
Bronze medal – third place	2002 Manchester	Men's singles
European Championships
Bronze medal – third place	2000 Glasgow	Men's singles
European Junior Championships
Silver medal – second place	1997 Nymburk	Boys' singles

Richard Vaughan (born 16 April 1978) is a former international badminton player from Wales who is a two-time Olympian, won bronze medals at Commonwealth Games and European Championships and is a twelve-times champion of Wales. From 2015 to 2021 he was the CEO for Squash Australia, and since 2023 the Vice-President and then Chief Operating Officer for the Badminton World Federation (BWF).

== Biography ==
Vaughan from Llanbradach, Caerphilly, represented the Welsh team at the 1998 Commonwealth Games in Kuala Lumpur, Malaysia, where he competed in the singles and team events.

He won a bronze medal at the 2000 European Badminton Championships, losing to Peter Gade of Denmark in the semi-final. In 2000 he made his Olympic debut at the 2000 Summer Olympics in Sydney. During the men's singles he beat world No5 Boonsak Ponsana of Thailand in the first round and Swedish No1 Rasmus Wengberg in the 2nd round, before losing to World No1 and World Champion Sun Jun of China, 13–15 13–15. He beat the World No1 Roslin Hashim of Malaysia at the 2001 Danish Open.

Vaughan represented the Welsh team again at the 2002 Commonwealth Games, winninga bronze medal. He beat world No3 Ronald Susilo of Singapore and Abhinn Shyam Gupta of India on the way to the semi-final, where he lost to Lee Tsuen Seng of Malaysia. That same year he reached his highest world ranking of number 7. In 2004 Vaughan beat the World Champion Xia Xuanze of China at the All England Super Series and attended his second Olympic Games at the 2004 Summer Olympics despite contracting a virus similar to glandular fever, which seriously impaired his preparation for the Athens Olympics. In men's singles, he defeated Marco Vasconcelos of Portugal in the first round. In the round of 16, Vaughan was defeated by Shon Seung-Mo of Korea, the eventual silver medalist.

Vaughan went to his third Commonwealth Games in 2006 and earned 86 Welsh international caps. He was the xseven-time singles champion of Wales at the Welsh National Badminton Championships.

Towards the end of his paying career in 2005 he established the Richard Vaughan Badminton Academy, based in the United Kingdom, helping establish many British and European players. In 2008, Vaughan was a member of Team Darfur, a sporting pressure group in the lead up to the 2008 Olympic Games. He worked as a Director in IT sector before becoming the Chief Executive (CEO) of Badminton Ireland between 2011 and 2015. In 2014 Vaughan joined the board of Badminton Europe and chaired the High-Performance Commission, which has oversaw the development of a European Training Centre in Denmark.

From 2015 to 2020 Vaughan was the CEO of Squash Australia, guiding Australia at the 2018 Commonwealth Games in Gold Coast. In 2019, Vaughan established the 'Friends of Squash' Parliament competition with the current Sports Minister Anika Wells and Prime Minister Anthony Albanese. and in late 2020 joined the board at Equestrian Australia as a Non-Executive Director, Chairing the Finance Committee.

== Achievements ==
=== Commonwealth Games ===
Men's singles
Year	Venue	Opponent	Score	Result
2002	Bolton Arena; Manchester, England	(Malaysia) Lee Tsuen Seng		Bronze

=== European Championships ===
Men's singles
Year	Venue	Opponent	Score	Result
2000	Kelvin Hall; Glasgow, Scotland	(Denmark) Peter Gade	3–15, 4–15	Bronze

=== European Junior Championships ===
Boys' singles
Year	Venue	Opponent	Score	Result
1997	Nymburk, Czech Republic	(Netherlands) Dicky Palyama	15–11, 11–15, 15–18	Silver

=== World Grand Prix ===
The World Badminton Grand Prix sanctioned by International Badminton Federation (IBF) since 1983.

Men's singles
Year	Tournament	Opponent	Score	Result
2000	Polish Open	(Ukraine) Vladislav Druzchenko	12–15, 12–15	(silver) Runner-up
1999	Polish Open	(Indonesia) Rio Suryana	9–15, 15–6, 12–15	(silver) Runner-up

Best Grand Prix results

- Last 16 All England 2001, 2002, 2004, 2007
- 1/4 Final Danish Grand Prix 2001
- 1/4 Final Swiss Grand Prix 2002
- 1/4 Final German Grand Prix 2002
- Semi Final Dutch Grand Prix 2000
- Semi Final US Grand Prix 2007
- Final Polish Grand Prix 2000
- Final Polish Grand Prix 2001

=== BWF International Challenge/Series ===
Men's singles
Year	Tournament	Opponent	Score	Result
2006	Canadian International			(silver) Runner-up
2006	Waikato International	(New Zealand) John Moody	21–11, 16–21, 20–22	(silver) Runner-up
2006	Victorian International	(India) Nikhil Kanetkar	22–20, 21–13	(gold) Winner
2006	Estonian International			(silver) Runner-up
2006	Mauritius International	(Italy) Klaus Raffeiner	21–11, 21–18	(gold) Winner
2006	Kenya International	(Uganda) Edwin Ekiring	21–16, 21–17	(gold) Winner
2006	South Africa International			(gold) Winner
2003	Peru International	(Netherlands) Tjitte Weistra	15–4, 15–8	(gold) Winner
2003	Giraldilla International	(Japan) Sho Sasaki	15–11, 6–15, 12–15	(silver) Runner-up
2003	Guatemala International	(Japan) Hidetaka Yamada	11–15, 15–10, 15–8	(gold) Winner
2002	South Africa International	(South Africa) Stewart Carson	7–1, 7–0, 7–0	(gold) Winner
2002	Spanish International	(Netherlands) Dicky Palyama	4–7, 1–7, 7–5	(silver) Runner-up
2001	Bulgarian International	(England) Andrew South	7–2, 5–7, 7–2	(gold) Winner
2000	Cuba International	(Finland) Jyri Aalto	15–8, 15–6	(gold) Winner
2000	Canadian International	(Finland) Jyri Aalto	12–15, 15–7, 9–15	(silver) Runner-up
2000	Welsh International	(England) Andrew South	1–7, 7–2, 7–5	(gold) Winner
2000	Dutch International	(Ukraine) Vladislav Druzchenko	15–10, 6–15, 11–15	(silver) Runner-up
2000	Croatian International	(Finland) Jyri Aalto	15–10, 15–13	(gold) Winner
1999	Welsh International	(Sweden) Rasmus Wengberg	17–16, 17–14	(gold) Winner
1999	Le Volant d'Or de Toulouse	(India) Pullela Gopichand	13–15, 15–14, 6–15	(silver) Runner-up
1999	Slovenian International	(Denmark) Kasper Ødum	15–4, 11–15, 15–9	(gold) Winner
1999	Chile International	(Canada) Bobby Milroy	15–9, 15–5	(gold) Winner
1999	Peru International	(Indonesia) Ardy Wiranata	15–7, 2–15, 9–15	(silver) Runner-up
1998	Argentina International			(gold) Winner
1998	Brazil International	(Norway) Jim Ronny Andersen	15–6, 15–8	(gold) Winner
1998	Spanish International	(Netherlands) Gerben Bruijstens	15–5, 15–1	(gold) Winner

Mixed doubles
Year	Tournament	Partner	Opponent	Score	Result
2009	Cyprus International	(Wales) Sarah Thomas	(New Zealand) Henry Tam (New Zealand) Donna Haliday	18–21, 14–21	(silver) Runner-up
2009	Banuinvest International	(Wales) Sarah Thomas	(Ukraine) Valeriy Atrashchenkov (Ukraine) Elena Prus	19–21, 12–21	(silver) Runner-up

BWF International Challenge tournament
BWF International Series tournament
