= Jacek Hankiewicz =

Polish badminton player

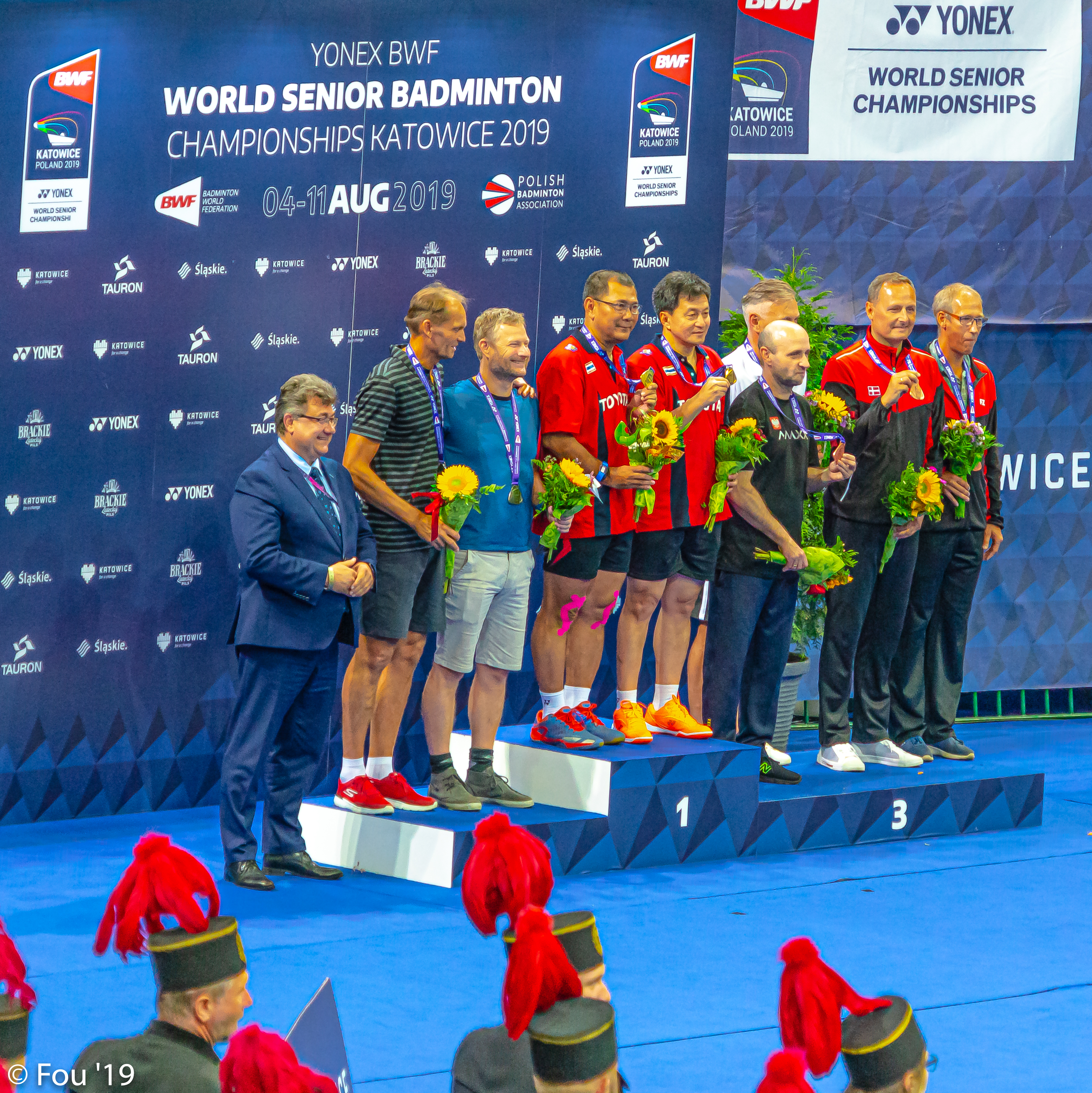

Personal information
- Born: 22 December 1965 (age 60) Krosno, Poland
- Years active: 1983–2006
- Height: 1.73 m (5 ft 8 in)
- Weight: 69 kg (152 lb)

Sport
- Country: Poland
- Sport: Badminton
- Handedness: Right

Men's singles & doubles
- Career record: 113 wins, 107 losses
- BWF profile
Medal record
Men's badminton
Representing Poland
Helvetia Cup
Gold medal – first place	1989 Budapest	Mixed team
Gold medal – first place	1991 Varna	Mixed team
Silver medal – second place	1993 Pressbaum	Mixed team

Jacek Hankiewicz (born 22 December 1965) is a Polish badminton player. He is a 4-time national champion in men's singles and a 6-time national champion in men's doubles.

After his retirement from international badminton in 2006, he became a coach of the Poland national badminton team and has produced players whom have excelled on the international stage, one of them being the former world number 1 mixed doubles pairing of Robert Mateusiak and Nadieżda Zięba.

== Career ==
In 1991, Hankiewicz partnered with Jerzy Dołhan and finished as runners-up at the Bulgaria International. In 1992, Hankiewicz made his Olympic debut when he competed in the men's singles tournament at the 1992 Summer Olympics. He was halted in the first round after losing to Fumihiko Machida in three games.

Prior to retiring from international badminton, Hankiewicz competed in the 2006 European Senior Badminton Championships where he won a gold medal in the men's singles 40+ discipline and in men's doubles with Jerzy Dołhan.

== Achievements ==
=== IBF International ===
Men's singles

Year	Tournament	Opponent	Score	Result
1987	Bulgaria International	(Denmark) Peter Busch Jensen	15–9, 15–7	(gold) Winner

Men's doubles

Year	Tournament	Partner	Opponent	Score	Result
1991	Bulgaria International	(Poland) Jerzy Dołhan	(Germany) Michael Helber (Germany) Michael Keck	10–15, 5–15	(silver) Runner-up
