= Steve Butler (badminton) =

English badminton player (born 1963)

Personal information
- Born: 27 September 1963 (age 63)

Sport
- Country: England
- Sport: Badminton
Medal record
Men's badminton
Representing England
Thomas Cup
| Bronze medal – third place | 1984 Kuala Lumpur | Men's team |
Commonwealth Games
| Gold medal – first place | 1990 Auckland | Mixed team |
European Championships
| Bronze medal – third place | 1990 Moscow | Men's singles |
| Bronze medal – third place | 1990 Moscow | Mixed team |
European Junior Championships
| Silver medal – second place | 1981 Edinburgh | Boys' singles |
| Silver medal – second place | 1981 Edinburgh | Mixed team |
| Bronze medal – third place | 1981 Edinburgh | Mixed doubles |

Stephen P. Butler, (born 27 September 1963) is a retired male badminton player and current coach from England.

== Badminton career ==
Butler represented England and won a gold medal in the team event, at the 1990 Commonwealth Games in Auckland, New Zealand. He also participated in the singles and reached the quarter finals where he lost to the eventual winner Rashid Sidek.

He won 74 caps for England between 1982 and 1994. While playing and coaching in the United States in the mid 1990s Butler won men's singles at the U.S. (closed) National Championships in 1996, five years after having won singles at the Open U.S. Championships in 1991.

== Achievements ==
=== European Championships ===
Men's singles
| Year | Venue | Opponent | Score | Result |
|---|---|---|---|---|
| 1990 | Minor Arena of the Central Lenin Stadium; Moscow, Soviet Union | (England) Darren Hall | 7–15, 8–15 | Bronze |

=== European Junior Championships ===
Boys' singles
| Year | Venue | Opponent | Score | Result |
|---|---|---|---|---|
| 1981 | Meadowbank Sports Centre; Edinburgh, Scotland | (Denmark) Michael Kjeldsen | 13–18, 6–15 | Silver |

Mixed doubles
| Year | Venue | Partner | Opponent | Score | Result |
|---|---|---|---|---|---|
| 1981 | Meadowbank Sports Centre; Edinburgh, Scotland | (England) Fiona Smith | (England) Dipak Tailor (England) Mary Leeves | 2–15, 6–15 | Bronze |

=== IBF World Grand Prix ===
The World Badminton Grand Prix was sanctioned by the International Badminton Federation (IBF) from 1983 to 2006.

Men's singles
| Year | Tournament | Opponent | Score | Result |
|---|---|---|---|---|
| 1988 | Canadian Open | (Australia) Sze Yu | 7–15, 15–10, 15–5 | (gold) Winner |
| 1991 | Canadian Open | (Soviet Union) Andrey Antropov | 17–15, 15–12 | (gold) Winner |
| 1991 | U.S. Open | (South Korea) Kim Hyung-jin | 15–6, 18–17 | (gold) Winner |
| 1993 | Scottish Open | (Denmark) Thomas Stuer-Lauridsen | 15–12, 15–10 | (gold) Winner |

=== IBF International ===
Men's singles
| Year | Tournament | Opponent | Score | Result |
|---|---|---|---|---|
| 1982 | Welsh International | (England) Andy Goode | 15–6, 15–4 | (gold) Winner |
| 1982 | Czechoslovakian International | (Soviet Union) Anatoliy Skripko | 15–11, 15–10 | (gold) Winner |
| 1982 | Bell's Open | (England) Ray Stevens | 10–15, 15–17 | (silver) Runner-up |
| 1982 | Victor Cup | (England) Kevin Jolly | walkover | (silver) Runner-up |
| 1983 | Welsh International | (England) Darren Hall | 15–11, 15–9 | (gold) Winner |
| 1992 | Polish Open | (Russia) Pavel Uvarov | 15–4, 8–15, 15–13 | (gold) Winner |
| 1992 | Norwegian International | (Finland) Robert Liljequist | 15–10, 15–5 | (gold) Winner |
| 1993 | Iceland International | (Iceland) Broddi Kristjánsson | 15–1, 15–3 | (gold) Winner |

Men's doubles
| Year | Tournament | Partner | Opponent | Score | Result |
|---|---|---|---|---|---|
| 1982 | Czechoslovakian International | (England) Nigel Tier | (Soviet Union) Anatoliy Skripko (Soviet Union) Evgeniy Dayanov | 15–2, 15–3 | (gold) Winner |

== Coaching ==
Leaving England in the mid 1990s he coached initially in New York and then in Colorado where he became the United States National coach. In 1997 he became the England national coach for the junior team and then in 2002 became the National men’s singles coach until 2005. He returned to the same role in 2015.
