= Darryl Yung =

Canadian badminton player (born 1972)

Personal information
- Country: Canada
- Born: 5 August 1972 (age 52); Victoria, British Columbia, Canada
Medal record
Men's badminton
Representing Canada
Pan American Games
Gold medal – first place	1995 Mar del Plata	Mixed doubles

Darryl Yung (born 5 August 1972) is a Canadian badminton player. He competed in two events at the 1996 Summer Olympics.

== Business career ==
In 2003, Yung founded ClearOne Badminton Centres with his first location in Richmond, BC. They have since launched additional locations in Calgary and Orlando.
