= Paul Staight =

Australian badminton player

Personal information
- Nationality: Australian
- Born: 8 December 1974 (age 51) Werribee, Victoria, Australia

Sport
- Sport: Badminton

Paul Staight (born 8 December 1974) is an Australian badminton player. He competed in the men's doubles tournament at the 1996 Summer Olympics.
