= Peter Knowles (badminton) =

British badminton player

Personal information
- Born: 28 December 1969 (age 56) Stockport, Cheshire, England
- Height: 1.77 m (5 ft 10 in)
- Weight: 77 kg (170 lb)

Sport
- Country: England
- Sport: Badminton
- Handedness: Right
- Event: Men's singles & doubles

Men's singles & doubles
- BWF profile
Medal record
Men's badminton
Representing England
Commonwealth Games
Gold medal – first place	1994 Victoria	Mixed team
Bronze medal – third place	1998 Kuala Lumpur	Men's team
European Junior Championships
Silver medal – second place	1987 Warsaw	Mixed team

Peter Knowles (born 28 December 1969) is a former English badminton player. He competed for Great Britain at the 1996 and 2000 Summer Olympics. He also represented England at the 1994 and 1998 Commonwealth Games, winning a mixed team gold in 1994, and a men's team bronze medal in 1998. Knowles who played for Kent badminton won the men's singles title at the National Championships in 1997, and has been capped 39 times for England.

== Achievements ==
=== IBF World Grand Prix ===
The World Badminton Grand Prix sanctioned by International Badminton Federation (IBF) since 1983.

Men's singles
Year	Tournament	Opponent	Score	Result
1996	Polish Open	(China) Yu Lizhi	6–15, 15–18	(silver) Runner-up
1995	Scottish Open	(Denmark) Jim Laugesen	15–11, 15–7	(gold) Winner
1993	Swiss Open	(Indonesia) Fung Permadi	11–15, 9–15	(silver) Runner-up

=== IBF International ===
Men's singles
Year	Tournament	Opponent	Score	Result
1999	Irish International	(England) Darren Hall	15–9, 15–4	(gold) Winner
1999	Italian International	(Switzerland) Salim	10–15, 1–15	(silver) Runner-up
1995	Wimbledon International	(Belgium) Pedro Vanneste	15–12, 15–5	(gold) Winner
1993	Welsh International	(England) Darren Hall	17–14, 6–15, 5–15	(silver) Runner-up
1993	Wimbledon International	(China) Sun Jun	13–15, 17–16, 8–15	(silver) Runner-up
1992	Welsh International	(England) Anders Nielsen	10–15, 10–15	(silver) Runner-up

Men's doubles
Year	Tournament	Partner	Opponent	Score	Result
1991	Iceland International	(England) Matthew Smith	(Iceland) Þorsteinn Páll Hængsson (Iceland) Ármann Þorvaldsson	15–4, 14–18, 10–15	(silver) Runner-up
