= Jyri Aalto =

Finnish badminton player (born 1969)

Personal information
- Born: 11 July 1969 (age 55); Helsinki, Finland
- Height: 1.72 m (5 ft 8 in)
- Weight: 70 kg (150 lb)

Sport
- Sport: Badminton

Jyri Tapani Aalto (born 11 July 1969) is a Finnish badminton player. He competed in the singles event at the 2000 Summer Olympics.

== Club career ==
At the 2000 Sydney International, he teamed up with Anu Wickström in a badminton match. He was ranked 30th in the world and won five points, but the second set was much closer and he eventually lost in two sets in 42 minutes.
