= Hans Sperre Jr. =

Norwegian badminton player

Personal information
- Born: 13 September 1967 (age 58) Sandefjord, Norway
- Years active: 1989–1999
- Height: 1.83 m (6 ft 0 in)

Sport
- Country: Norway
- Sport: Badminton
- Handedness: Right
- BWF profile
Medal record
Men's badminton
Representing Norway
European Junior Championships
Bronze medal – third place	1985 Pressbaum	Boys' doubles

Hans Sperre Jr. (born 13 September 1967) is a Norwegian badminton player. He competed in the men's singles tournament at the 1992 Summer Olympics. Sperre Jr. is a 16-time national champion in men's singles and has won the men's doubles title numerous times in the national championships with Jorn Myrestrand, Tor Egil Kristensen and Erik Lia.

== Career ==
Sperre Jr. followed in his father Hans Sperre's footsteps in 1986 when he won his first Norwegian title in men's singles. In April 1991, he won the Amor International with his partner Erik Lia after defeating Michael Kjeldsen and Claus Thomsen of Denmark in the final. In that same month, Sperre Jr. and Lia reached the final of the Austrian International but lost to Michael Keck and Robert Neumann of Germany in the final.

Sperre Jr. made his Olympic debut in the 1992 Summer Olympics when he competed in the men's singles tournament. He lost in the first round against Foo Kok Keong of Malaysia.

In 1993, he won the Hungarian International after defeating Vladislav Druzchenko of Ukraine in the final with a score of 15–9, 15–11.

== Achievements ==
=== European Junior Championships ===
Boys' doubles

Year	Venue	Partner	Opponent	Score	Result
1985	Pressbaum, Austria	(Norway) Jorn Myrestrand	(Denmark) Jan Paulsen (Denmark) Lars Pedersen	15–18, 10–15	Bronze

=== IBF International ===
Men's singles

Year	Tournament	Opponent	Score	Result
1993	Hungarian International	(Ukraine) Vladislav Druzchenko	15–9, 15–11	(gold) Winner

Men's doubles

Year	Tournament	Partner	Opponent	Score	Result
1991	Amor International	(Norway) Erik Lia	(Denmark) Michael Kjeldsen (Denmark) Claus Thomsen	1–15, 18–16, 15–12	(gold) Winner
1991	Austrian International	(Norway) Erik Lia	(Germany) Michael Keck (Germany) Robert Neumann	3–15, 8–15	(silver) Runner-up
