= Robert Liljequist =

Finnish badminton player

Personal information
- Nickname: Roope
- Born: 27 January 1971 (age 55) Helsinki, Finland
- Height: 1.80 m (5 ft 11 in)
- Weight: 76 kg (168 lb)

Sport
- Country: Finland
- Sport: Badminton
- Handedness: Right

Men's singles
- Career record: 93 wins, 79 losses
- BWF profile
Medal record
Men's badminton
Representing Finland
Helvetia Cup
Silver medal – second place	1989 Budapest	Mixed team

Hans Robert Liljequist (born 27 January 1971) is a retired male badminton player from Finland.

A member of the Helsingfors Badminton Club, Liljequist competed in badminton at the 1992 Summer Olympics in men's singles. He lost in the second round to Hermawan Susanto, of Indonesia, 15-11, 15-3. In the 1990s, he won 6 titles at the Finnish National Badminton Championships.

== Career ==
Liljequist competed in the 1991 Czech International. He won the men's singles final after defeating Erik Lia of Norway with a score of 15–8, 15–4. He also won the Bulgarian Open at that same year.

In 1992, Liljequist competed in badminton at the 1992 Summer Olympics in Barcelona. He lost to eventual bronze medalist Hermawan Susanto in the second round. After the 1992 Olympics, Liljequist entered the final of the Norwegian International but lost to Stephen Butler in the final.

In 1993, he competed in the Finnish Open. In the semifinals, he lost to Peter Espersen of Denmark.

In 1998, he won the Baltic International after defeating Aivaras Kvedarauskas of Lithuania in the final.

== Achievements ==
=== IBF International ===
Men's singles
Year	Tournament	Opponent	Score	Result
1991	Czech International	(Norway) Erik Lia	15–8, 15–4	(gold) Winner
1991	Bulgarian Open	(Chinese Taipei) Wei Yan	8–15, 18–14, 8–4 retired	(gold) Winner
1992	Norwegian International	(England) Stephen Butler	10–15, 5–15	(silver) Runner-up
1998	Baltic International	(Lithuania) Aivaras Kvedarauskas	15–2, 15–3	(gold) Winner
