= Mikhail Korshuk =

Belarusian badminton player

Personal information
- Nationality: Belarusian
- Born: 22 September 1969 (age 55)

Sport
- Sport: Badminton

Mikhail Korshuk (born 22 September 1969) is a Belarusian badminton player. He competed in two events at the 1996 Summer Olympics.
