= Hannes Fuchs =

Austrian badminton player

Personal information
- Born: 9 March 1972 (age 54) Linz, Austria
- Height: 1.83 m (6 ft 0 in)

Sport
- Country: Austria
- Sport: Badminton
- Handedness: Right

Men's singles and doubles
- Career record: 125 wins, 90 losses
- BWF profile
Medal record
Men's badminton
Representing Austria
Helvetia Cup
Gold medal – first place	1993 Pressbaum	Mixed team

Hannes Fuchs (born 9 March 1972) is a retired male badminton player from Austria.

== Career ==
Fuchs competed in badminton at the 1992 Summer Olympics in men's singles. He lost in the second round to Deepankar Bhattacharya, of India, 8-15, 15-11, 15-11. He also played in men's doubles with Jürgen Koch and they were beaten in the first round.

In 1993 he won the Russian Open, the Slovenian International and the Bulgarian International, and in 1994 the Bulgarian International again. He also competed at the 1996 Summer Olympics.

== Achievements ==
=== IBF International ===
Men's singles

Year	Tournament	Opponent	Score	Result
1991	Hungarian International	(South Korea) Lee Yong-sun	7–15, 6–15	(silver) Runner-up
1992	Malta International	(Czech Republic) Tomasz Mendrek	18–16, 11–15, 5–15	(silver) Runner-up
1993	Slovenian International	(Ukraine) Vladislav Druzchenko	18–15, 15–2	(gold) Winner
1993	Russian Open	(Russia) Vladislav Tikhomirov	15–6, 15–3	(gold) Winner
1994	Bulgarian Open	(Ukraine) Vladislav Druzchenko	15–11, 15–10	(gold) Winner

Men's doubles

Year	Tournament	Partner	Opponent	Score	Result
1990	Malta International	(Austria) Jürgen Koch	(Denmark) Martin Skovgaard (Denmark) Michael Søgaard	15–11, 4–15, 2–15	(silver) Runner-up
1992	Malta International	(Austria) Heimo Götschl	(Austria) Kai Abraham (Austria) Heinz Fischer	12–15, 7–15	(silver) Runner-up
