= Étienne Thobois =

French badminton player (born 1967)

Personal information
- Nationality: French
- Born: 20 September 1967 (age 57); Amiens, France

Sport
- Sport: Badminton

Étienne Thobois (born 20 September 1967) is a French badminton player. He competed in the men's singles tournament at the 1996 Summer Olympics. He serves as director general of the Paris Organising Committee for the 2024 Olympic and Paralympic Games. In April 2025, he was elected as the deputy president of Badminton World Federation at the 2025 annual general meeting of the federation in Xiamen, China.
