= Paul Stevenson (badminton) =

Australian badminton player

Personal information
- Nationality: Australian
- Born: 3 May 1966 (age 59); Bendigo, Victoria, Australia

Sport
- Sport: Badminton

Paul Stevenson (born 3 May 1966) is an Australian badminton player. He competed in the mixed doubles tournament at the 1996 Summer Olympics.
