= Pontus Jäntti =

Finnish badminton player

Personal information
- Born: Pontus Eero Jäntti; 20 December 1968 (age 57) Helsinki, Finland
- Height: 1.80 m (5 ft 11 in)

Sport
- Country: Finland
- Sport: Badminton
- Event: Men's singles

Men's singles
- BWF profile
Medal record
Men's badminton
Representing Finland
European Junior Championships
Gold medal – first place	1989 Manchester	Boys' singles

Pontus Eero Jäntti (born 20 December 1968) is a Finnish badminton player. He competed at the 1992 and the 1996 Summer Olympics.

== Achievements ==
=== European Junior Championships ===
Boys' singles

Year	Venue	Opponent	Score	Result
1987	Hali Mery, Warsaw, Poland	(Denmark) Michael Søgaard	15–5, 15–9	Gold

=== IBF World Grand Prix ===
The World Badminton Grand Prix was sanctioned by the International Badminton Federation from 1983 to 2006.

Men's singles

Year	Tournament	Opponent	Score	Result
1992	Scottish Open	(Denmark) Peter Espersen	15–9, 15–6	(gold) Winner

=== IBF International ===
Men's singles

Year	Tournament	Opponent	Score	Result
1990	Stockholm International	(Denmark) Claus Thomsen	15–11, 9–15, 15–7	(gold) Winner
1991	Amor International	(Netherlands) Chris Bruil	15–7, 15–10	(gold) Winner
1992	Amor International	(Russia) Andrey Antropov	8–15, 15–11, 15–3	(gold) Winner
1998	Scottish International	(England) Darren Hall	15–13, 15–8	(gold) Winner
