= Pavel Uvarov (badminton) =

Russian badminton player (born 1967)

Personal information
- Nationality: Russian
- Born: 22 March 1967 (age 58)

Sport
- Sport: Badminton

Pavel Uvarov (born 22 March 1967) is a Russian badminton player. He competed in the men's singles tournament at the 1996 Summer Olympics. In 1992 Uvarov started playing for Badminton club La Chaux-de-Fonds. Later Uvarov moved to Switzerland, where he became the coach of his club, leading it to the highest level of Badminton in Switzerland and winning the Swiss championship 5 times between 1998 and 2007. In 2010 Uvarov was let go from La Chaux-de-Fonds and took up a position coaching BC Neuchâtel.

Uvarov is married to his wife Maria Uvarova, who is a former European senior Badminton champion, and with whom he has two children. In 2024 their daughter Sofia was ranked 8th in Europe in under-17s Badminton.
