= Murray Hocking =

Australian badminton player (born 1971)

Murray Hocking (born 31 May 1971 in Victoria) is a badminton player from Australia. As well as representing Australia in 3 commonwealth games (2002, 1998 and 1994) he represented his country in badminton at the 1996 Olympic Games in Atlanta, making it to the round of 32.
