= Thomas Wapp =

Swiss badminton player

Personal information
- Nationality: Swiss
- Born: 29 January 1972 (age 53)
- Children: 2

Sport
- Sport: Badminton

Thomas Wapp (born 29 January 1972) is a Swiss badminton player. He competed in the singles and doubles events at the 1996 Summer Olympics. Among others, he also competed in the IBF World Championships singles event in 1991, 1993, 1995 and 1999.
