= Fumihiko Machida =

Japanese badminton player

Fumihiko Machida 町田 文彦

Personal information
- Country: Japan
- Born: 17 March 1969 (age 56); Tochigi Prefecture, Japan
- Height: 1.72 m (5 ft 8 in)
- Weight: 70 kg (154 lb)
- Handedness: Right
Medal record
Men's badminton
Representing Japan
East Asian Games
Silver medal – second place	1997 Busan	Men's singles
Bronze medal – third place	1997 Busan	Men's team

Fumihiko Machida (町田 文彦, Machida Fumihiko, born 17 March 1969) is a Japanese badminton player who competed at the 1992 and 1996 Summer Olympics. He won the national men's singles title in 1994 and 1996. He also won the national men's doubles title in 1995 with Seiichi Watanabe.

== Career ==
Machida competed in the men's singles event at the 1992 Summer Olympics where he lost the second round to eventual champion Poul-Erik Høyer Larsen. He then made his second appearance at the Olympics in 1996 where he reached the third round but lost to Park Sung-woo.

In 1997, he won a silver medal in men's singles at the 1997 Asian Games.

== Achievements ==
=== East Asian Games ===
Men's singles

Year	Venue	Opponent	Score	Result
1997	Pukyong National University Gymnasium, Busan, South Korea	(Chinese Taipei) Fung Permadi	13–18, 5–15	Silver
