= Portuguese National Badminton Championships =

The Portuguese National Badminton Championships is a tournament organized to crown the best badminton players in Portugal. The tournament started in 1956.

== Past winners ==
Year	Men's singles	Women's singles	Men's doubles	Women's doubles	Mixed doubles
1956	Jose da Silva	Lezita Chaves	Jose da Silva; Anibal Rebelo	no competition	Jose da Silva; Guida de Freitas
1957	Jose da Silva	Lezita Chaves	Alberte Fernandes; Ramiro Correia	Alzira de Sousa; Josefina Praca dos Santos	Alberto Fernandes; Lezita Chaves
1958	Joaquim Pereira	Lezita Chaves	Ramiro Cirreia; Vitor Pinto Aves	no competition	Orlando Coelmo; Lezita Chaves
1959	Ramiro Correia	Lezita Chaves	Ramiro Correia; Jorge Gomez	no competition	Ramiro Correia; Isabel Cabral
1960	Ramiro Correia	Isabel Cabral	Ramiro Correia; Jorge Gomez	no competition	Orlando Correia; Lezita Chaves
1961	no competition	no competition	Ramiro Correia; Jorge Gomez	no competition	no competition
1962	no competition	no competition	Ramiro Correia; Alegre Santos	no competition	Jorge Gomez; Isabel Cabral
1963	Alegre Santos	Isabel Cabral	Rui Damasio; Mario Mateus	Emilia Carneiro; Maria Jose Guimaraes	Jose Azevedo; Isabel Rocha
1964	Alegre Santos	Isabel Rocha	Fernando Pinto; Vitor Pinto Alves	no competition	Alegre Santos; Isabel Rocha
1965	Alegre Santos	no competition	Rui Damasio; Mario Mateus	Isabel Pinto; Isabel Rocha	Fernando Pinto; Peggy Brixhe
1966	Jose Novais	Isabel Rocha	Fernando Pinto; Vitor Da Costa	Conceicao Felizardo; Isabel Rocha	Alegre Santos; Isabel Rocha
1967	Alegre Santos	Isabel Rocha	José Bento; Marques Costa	Conceicao Felizardo; Isabel Rocha	Jose Azevedo; Isabel Rocha
1968	José Bento	Peggy Brixhe	Rui Damasio; Jose Azevedo	Peggy Brixhe; Isabel Salema	Jose Azevedo; Isabel Rocha
1969	José Bento	Peggy Brixhe	Alegre dos Santos; Monge Dias	no competition	Jose Azevedo; Isabel Rocha
1970	José Bento	Isabel Rocha	José Bento; Marques Costa	no competition	José Bento; Isabel Rocha
1971	no data	no data	José Bento; Marques Costa	Peggy Brixhe; Lavinia Pais	Pinto Alves; Peggy Brixhe
1972	José Bento	Peggy Brixhe	José Bento; Marques Costa	Isabel Rocha; Isabel Pinto	José Bento; Isabel Rocha
1973	José Bento	Isabel Rocha	José Bento; Marques Costa	Isabel Rocha; Isabel Pinto	José Bento; Isabel Rocha
1974	José Bento	Isabel Rocha	José Bento; Marques Costa	Margarida Cruz; Isabel Cruz	José Bento; Isabel Rocha
1975	José Bento	Isabel Rocha	Francisco Lemos; Guilherme Trindade	Margarida Cruz; Isabel Cruz	José Bento; Isabel Rocha
1976	Luis Quinaz	Isabel Rocha	José Bento; Marques Costa	Isabel Rocha; Ana Margarida	Guilherme Trindade; Isabel Rocha
1977	Joso Braz	Isabel Rocha	José Bento; Cristiano Dias	Helena Sousa; Serafina Brandao	Jorge Cruz; Ana Monteiro
1978	Antonio Monge	Dias Anna Monteiro	José Bento; Jorge Cruz	Margarida Cruz; Isabel Cruz	Jorge Nogueira; Teresa Lesl
1979	José Bento	Anna Monteiro	José Bento; Jorge Cruz	Ana Monteiro; Isabel Rocha	Jose Pessoa; Isabel Rocha
1980	Jose Pessoa	Margarida Cruz	José Bento; Marques da Costa	Ana Monteiro; Isabel Rocha	José Bento; Ana Monteiro
1981	Antonio Crespo	Margarida Cruz	Antonio Crespo; Jorge Cruz	Margerida Cruz; Isabel Crespo	José Bento; Ana Monteiro
1982	José Pedro	Margarida Cruz	Diamantino Pereira; Jorge Azevedo	Ana Monteiro; Catarina Batista	Jorge Cruz; Margarida Cruz
1983	Antonio Crespo	Margarida Cruz	Diamantino Pereira; Jorge Azevedo	Ana Monteiro; Catarina Batista	Jorge Cruz; Margarida Cruz
1984	Jorge Azevedo	Ana Monteiro	Diamantino Pereira; Jorge Azevedo	Ana Monteiro; Catarina Batista	José Brandão; Rosaria Cavaco
1985	José Brandão	Rosario Cavaco	Paulo Raimundo; Carlos Teixeira	Rosario Cavaco; Margarida Cruz	José Nascimento; Paula Sousa
1986	Jorge Santos	Margarida Cruz	Paulo Raimundo; José Brandão	Paula Sousa; Margarida Cruz	José Nascimento; Paula Sousa
1987	Manuel Machado	Margarida Cruz	Duarte Anjo; José Brandão	Ana Monteiro; Catarina Batista	José Nascimento; Catarina Batista
1988	Jorge Azevedo	Margarida Cruz	Jorge Azevedo; Diamantino Pereira	Filipa Nesbitt; Paula Queluz	Luis Nesbitt; Filipa Nesbitt
1989	Jorge Santos	J. Gomes	José Nascimento; Jose Sim-Sim	Jose Gomes; Zamy Gomes	José Nascimento; Dina Rodrigues
1990	Ricardo Fernandes	Alice Oliveira	Ricardo Fernandes; Marco Vasconcelos	Maria Gomes; Zamy Gomes	Jose Sim; Maria Gomes
1991	Ricardo Fernandes	Alice Oliveira	Jorge Cacao; Fernando Silva	Maria Gomes; Zamy Gomes	Fernando Silva; Sonia Lopes
1992	Fernando Silva	Helena Berimbau	Jorge Cacao; Fernando Silva	Maria Gomes; Zamy Gomes	Fernando Silva; Sonia Lopes
1993	Ricardo Fernandes	Helena Berimbau	Fernando Silva; Ricardo Fernandes	Maria Gomes; Zamy Gomes	Fernando Silva; Sonia Lopes
1994	Ricardo Fernandes	Ana Ferreira	Fernando Silva; Ricardo Fernandes	Dina Rodrigues; Helena Berimbau	Fernando Silva; Sonia Lopes
1995	Ricardo Fernandes	Helena Berimbau	Fernando Silva; Ricardo Fernandes	Ana Lopes; Sonia Lopes	Fernando Silva; Sonia Lopes
1996	Fernando Silva	Helena Berimbau	Hugo Rodrigues; Marco Vasconcelos	Filipa Lamy; Helena Bartolomeu	Hugo Rodrigues; Ana Ferreira
1997	Fernando Silva	Filipa Lamy	Fernando Silva; Hugo Rodrigues	Filipa Lamy; Helena Bartolomeu	Hugo Rodrigues; Ana Ferreira
1998	Fernando Silva	Filipa Lamy	Fernando Silva; Hugo Rodrigues	Filipa Lamy; Helena Bartolomeu	Hugo Rodrigues; Ana Ferreira
1999	Fernando Silva	Francis Pereira	Fernando Silva; Hugo Rodrigues	Filipa Lamy; Telma Santos	Hugo Rodrigues; Ana Ferreira
2000	Marco Vasconcelos	Filipa Lamy	Hugo Rodrigues; Marco Vasconcelos	Ana Ferreira; Helena Berimbau	Hugo Rodrigues; Marco Vasconcelos
2001	Marco Vasconcelos	Telma Santos	Hugo Rodrigues; Marco Vasconcelos	Filipa Lamy; Telma Santos	Hugo Rodrigues; Helena Berimbau
2002	Marco Vasconcelos	Telma Santos	Hugo Rodrigues; Marco Vasconcelos	Filipa Lamy; Telma Santos	Fernando Silva; Filipa Lamy
2003	Marco Vasconcelos	Telma Santos	Fernando Silva; Ricardo Fernandes	Telma Santos; Vânia Leça	Fernando Silva; Vânia Leça
2004	Marco Vasconcelos	Filipa Lamy	Hugo Rodrigues; Marco Vasconcelos	Telma Santos; Vânia Leça	Alexandre Paixão; Filipa Lamy
2005	Marco Vasconcelos	Telma Santos	Hugo Rodrigues; Marco Vasconcelos	Filipa Lamy; Tânia Faria	Alexandre Paixão; Filipa Lamy
2006	Alexandre Paixão	Telma Santos	Alexandre Paixão; Marco Vasconcelos	Telma Santos; Vânia Leça	Alexandre Paixão; Filipa Lamy
2007	Alexandre Paixão	Telma Santos	Fernando Silva; Hugo Rodrigues	Telma Santos; Vânia Leça	Hugo Rodrigues; Vânia Leça
2008	Fernando Silva	Telma Santos	Fernando Silva; Hugo Rodrigues	Cláudia Figueira; Dalila Belém	Hugo Rodrigues; Telma Santos
2009	Pedro Martins	Telma Santos	Alexandre Paixão; Gil Martins	Filipa Lamy; Vânia Leça	Hugo Rodrigues; Telma Santos
2010	Nuno Santos	Telma Santos	Alexandre Paixão; Gil Martins	Ana Moura; Ana Reis	Hugo Rodrigues; Telma Santos
2011	Pedro Martins	Ana Moura	Alexandre Paixão; Gil Martins	Filipa Lamy; Vânia Leça	Alexandre Paixão; Vânia Leça
2012	Pedro Martins	Telma Santos	Fernando Silva; Hugo Rodrigues	Filipa Lamy; Vânia Leça	Pedro Martins; Ana Moura
2013	Pedro Martins	Telma Santos	Fernando Silva; Hugo Rodrigues	Telma Santos; Ana Moura	Pedro Martins; Ana Moura
2014	Pedro Martins	Telma Santos	Fernando Silva; Hugo Rodrigues	Ana Moura; Sofia Setim	Fernando Silva; Daniela Conceição
2015	Pedro Martins	Sónia Gonçalves	Bruno Carvalho; Tomás Nero	Daniela Conceição; Catarina Cristina	Fernando Silva; Daniela Conceição
2016	Pedro Martins	Sónia Gonçalves	Fernando Silva; Hugo Rodrigues	Adriana F. Gonçalves; Sónia Gonçalves	Bernardo Atilano; Mariana Chang
2017	Bernardo Atilano	Helena Pestana	Bruno Carvalho; Tomás Nero	Sofia Setim; Helena Pestana	Tomás Nero; Ana Reis
2018	Bernardo Atilano	Sofia Setim	Bruno Carvalho; Tomás Nero	Adriana F. Gonçalves; Sónia Gonçalves	Bernardo Atilano; Mariana Chang
2019	Bernardo Atilano	Sónia Gonçalves	Bruno Carvalho; Tomás Nero	Joana Lopes; Mariana Chang	Bernardo Atilano; Mariana Chang
2020	Bernardo Atilano	Sónia Gonçalves	Bruno Carvalho; Tomás Nero	Adriana F. Gonçalves; Sónia Gonçalves	Bernardo Atilano; Mariana Chang
2021	Bernardo Atilano	Adriana F. Gonçalves	Bruno Carvalho; Tomás Nero	Adriana F. Gonçalves; Sónia Gonçalves	Tomás Nero; Beatriz Roberto
2022	Bernardo Atilano	Sónia Gonçalves	Bruno Carvalho; Tomás Nero	Adriana F. Gonçalves; Sónia Gonçalves	Tomás Nero; Beatriz Roberto
2023	Bernardo Atilano	Madalena Fortunato	Bruno Carvalho; Tomás Nero	Adriana Gonçalves; Sónia Gonçalves	Bernardo Atilano; Mariana Chang
2024	Tiago Berenguer	Madalena Fortunato	Gabriel Enzo Rodrigues; Diogo Glória	Adriana Gonçalves; Sónia Gonçalves	David Silva; Marta Andrade E. Sousa
2024	Diogo Glória	Madalena Fortunato	Bruno Carvalho; Tomás Nero	Mariana Afonso; Madalena Fortunato	Diogo Glória; Erica Glória
