= Badminton at the 2008 Summer Olympics – Qualification =

A total of 173 players was planned to compete in badminton at the 2008 Summer Olympics in Beijing, People's Republic of China. Of them, 16 pairs competed in each doubles events, 41 players competed in the men's singles event and 47 players competed in the women's singles event.

== Qualifying criteria ==
The main qualifying criterion was the BWF Ranking list as of May 1, 2008. It provided a total of 16 pairs in each doubles event and 38 athletes in each singles event, in the following manner:

- Rankings 1–4: Players/pairs will be taken in turn unless a NOC has already qualified 3 players/pairs.
- Rankings 5–16: Players/pairs will be taken in turn unless a NOC has already qualified 2 players/pairs.
- Rankings 17+: Players/pairs will be taken in turn unless a NOC has already qualified 1 player/pair.

Each continent was guaranteed one entry in each event. If this was not satisfied by the entry selection method described above, the highest ranking player/pair had qualified. If there was no player/pair in the rankings, the winner of the most recently contested Continental Championship was qualified.

The host nation (People's Republic of China) entered 2 players in total, but more than 2 players were permitted if they all qualified under qualifying regulations.

There were also 2 invitational places in each singles event which were allocated by the IOC Tripartite Commission.

== Summary ==
NOC	Men's Singles	Men's Doubles	Women's Singles	Women's Doubles	Mixed Doubles	Total	
NOC	Men's Singles	Men's Doubles	Women's Singles	Women's Doubles	Mixed Doubles	Quotas	Athletes
Algeria	1					1	1
Australia	1	1	1	1		4	6
Belarus			1			1	1
Bulgaria			1			1	1
Canada	1		1		1	3	4
China	3	2	3	3	2	13	19
Chinese Taipei	1		1	1		3	4
Czech Republic	1		1			2	2
Denmark	2	2	1	1	1	7	10
Egypt			1			1	1
Estonia	1		1			2	2
Finland	1		1			2	2
France	1		1			2	2
Germany	1		2		1	4	5
Great Britain	1		1	1	2	5	6
Guatemala	1					1	1
Hong Kong	1		2			3	3
Iceland			1			1	1
India	1		1			2	2
Indonesia	2	2	1	1	2	8	11
Iran	1					1	1
Ireland	1		1			2	2
Italy			1			1	1
Japan	1	2	1	2		6	10
Lithuania	1		1			2	2
Malaysia	2	2	1	1		6	9
Mauritius			1			1	1
Mexico			1			1	1
New Zealand	1				1	2	3
Nigeria			1			1	1
Peru			1			1	1
Poland	1	1	1		1	4	5
Portugal	1		1			2	2
Russia	1		1			2	2
Seychelles					1	1	2
Singapore	1		1	1	1	4	5
Slovenia			1			1	1
Slovakia			1			1	1
South Africa		1	1	1		3	5
South Korea	2	2	1	2	2	9	13
Spain	1		1			2	2
Sri Lanka			1			1	1
Sweden			1			1	1
Switzerland	1		1			2	2
Thailand	1		1		1	3	4
Uganda	1					1	1
Ukraine	1		1			2	2
United States	1	1	1	1		4	5
Vietnam	1		1			2	2
Zambia	1					1	1
Total: 50 NOCs	41	16	47	16	16	136	173

== Qualifiers ==
The color pink signifies that a player withdrew from the competition.

=== Men's singles ===
No.	Rank	Player	NOC	Note
1	1	Lin Dan	China	
2	2	Lee Chong Wei	Malaysia	
3	3	Bao Chunlai	China	
4	4	Chen Jin	China	
5	5	Kenneth Jonassen	Denmark	
6	6	Sony Dwi Kuncoro	Indonesia	
7	7	Taufik Hidayat	Indonesia	
8	8	Peter Gade	Denmark	
9	9	Boonsak Ponsana	Thailand	
10	10	Park Sung-hwan	South Korea	
11	11	Lee Hyun-il	South Korea	
12	13	Przemysław Wacha	Poland	
13	14	Wong Choong Hann	Malaysia	
14	17	Ronald Susilo	Singapore	
15	18	Shoji Sato	Japan	
16	20	Ng Wei	Hong Kong	
17	30	Marc Zwiebler	Germany	
18	31	Andrew Smith	Great Britain	
19	33	Anup Sridhar	India	
20	34	Andrew Dabeka	Canada	
21	35	Nguyễn Tiến Minh	Vietnam	
—	36	Eric Pang	Netherlands	
22	38	Petr Koukal	Czech Republic	
23	40	John Moody	New Zealand	
24	43	Scott Evans	Ireland	
25	47	Pablo Abián	Spain	
26	52	Hsieh Yu-hsing	Chinese Taipei	
27	54	Ville Lång	Finland	
28	57	Kevin Cordón	Guatemala	
29	58	Kęstutis Navickas	Lithuania	
30	59	Erwin Kehlhoffner	France	
31	60	Stanislav Pukhov	Russia	
32	64	Marco Vasconcelos	Portugal	
33	68	Raju Rai	United States	
34	69	Vladislav Druzchenko	Ukraine	
35	72	Stuart Gomez	Australia	
—	79	Jürgen Koch	Austria	
—	83	Magnus Sahlberg	Sweden	
—	84	Yuhan Tan	Belgium	
36	86	Nabil Lasmari	Algeria	
37	88	Raul Must	Estonia	
38	92	Kaveh Mehrabi	Iran	
39	95	Edwin Ekiring	Uganda	
40	99	Christian Bösiger	Switzerland	
41	129	Eli Mambwe	Zambia	WC

=== Women's singles ===
No.	Rank	Player	NOC	Note
1	1	Xie Xingfang	China	
2	2	Zhang Ning	China	
3	3	Lu Lan	China	
4	5	Wang Chen	Hong Kong	
5	6	Pi Hongyan	France	
6	7	Tine Rasmussen	Denmark	
7	8	Xu Huaiwen	Germany	
—	9	Zhou Mi	Hong Kong	
8	10	Wong Mew Choo	Malaysia	
9	11	Jun Jae-youn	South Korea	
10	12	Yip Pui Yin	Hong Kong	
11	13	Juliane Schenk	Germany	
12	14	Tracey Hallam	Great Britain	
13	15	Eriko Hirose	Japan	
14	16	Cheng Shao-chieh	Chinese Taipei	
15	17	Petya Nedelcheva	Bulgaria	
—	18	Yao Jie	Netherlands	
16	23	Anna Rice	Canada	
17	24	Maria Kristin Yulianti	Indonesia	
18	26	Larisa Griga	Ukraine	
19	27	Ella Diehl	Russia	
20	31	Saina Nehwal	India	
21	32	Sara Persson	Sweden	
22	33	Salakjit Ponsana	Thailand	
23	36	Xing Aiying	Singapore	
24	41	Anu Nieminen	Finland	
25	42	Agnese Allegrini	Italy	
26	44	Kati Tolmoff	Estonia	
27	45	Claudia Rivero	Peru	
28	47	Jeanine Cicognini	Switzerland	
—	50	Rachel Hindley	New Zealand	
29	51	Olga Konon	Belarus	
—	55	Simone Prutsch	Austria	
30	56	Ragna Ingólfsdóttir	Iceland	
31	59	Ana Moura	Portugal	
32	60	Maja Tvrdy	Slovenia	
33	65	Eva Lee	United States	
34	69	Kristína Ludíková	Czech Republic	
35	75	Lê Ngọc Nguyên Nhung	Vietnam	
36	79	Chloe Magee	Ireland	
37	81	Yoana Martínez	Spain	
38	82	Kamila Augustyn	Poland	
39	89	Grace Daniel	Nigeria	
—	95	Huang Chia-chi	Australia	
40	100	Erin Carroll	Australia	
41	102	Karen Foo Kune	Mauritius	
42	107	Thilini Jayasinghe	Sri Lanka	
43	110	Akvilė Stapušaitytė	Lithuania	
—	116	Nathalie Descamps	Belgium	
44	118	Deyanira Angulo	Mexico	
45	119	Eva Sládeková	Slovakia	
46	142	Hadia Hosny	Egypt	
47	146	Kerry-Lee Harrington	South Africa	

=== Men's doubles ===
No.	Rank	Players	NOC	Note
1	1	Markis Kido / Hendra Setiawan	Indonesia	
2	2	Fu Haifeng / Cai Yun	China	
3	3	Jung Jae-sung / Lee Yong-dae	South Korea	
4	4	Choong Tan Fook / Lee Wan Wah	Malaysia	
5	5	Koo Kien Keat / Tan Boon Heong	Malaysia	
6	7	Luluk Hadiyanto / Alvent Yulianto	Indonesia	
7	8	Lars Paaske / Jonas Rasmussen	Denmark	
8	9	Guo Zhendong / Xie Zhongbo	China	
9	10	Hwang Ji-man / Lee Jae-jin	South Korea	
10	11	Shintaro Ikeda / Shuichi Sakamoto	Japan	
11	12	Jens Eriksen / Martin Lundgaard Hansen	Denmark	
12	14	Keita Masuda / Tadashi Ohtsuka	Japan	
—	16	Albertus Susanto Njoto / Yohan Hadikusumo Wiratama	Hong Kong	
13	18	Michał Łogosz / Robert Mateusiak	Poland	
14	21	Howard Bach / Bob Malaythong	United States	
15	42	Ross Smith / Glenn Warfe	Australia	
16	55	Chris Dednam / Roelof Dednam	South Africa	

=== Women's doubles ===
No.	Rank	Players	NOC	Note
1	1	Yang Wei / Zhang Jiewen	China	
2	2	Du Jing / Yu Yang	China	
3	3	Wei Yili / Zhang Yawen	China	
4	4	Lee Hyo-jung / Lee Kyung-won	South Korea	
5	5	Cheng Wen-hsing / Chien Yu-chin	Chinese Taipei	
6	6	Gail Emms / Donna Kellogg	Great Britain	
7	7	Kumiko Ogura / Reiko Shiota	Japan	
8	8	Miyuki Maeda / Satoko Suetsuna	Japan	
9	9	Vita Marissa / Liliyana Natsir	Indonesia	
10	10	Chin Eei Hui / Wong Pei Tty	Malaysia	
11	11	Jiang Yanmei / Li Yujia	Singapore	
12	13	Lena Frier Kristiansen / Kamilla Rytter Juhl	Denmark	
13	15	Ha Jung-eun / Kim Min-jung	South Korea	
14	36	Eva Lee / Mesinee Mangkalakiri	United States	
15	49	Tania Luiz / Eugenia Tanaka	Australia	
16	79	Chantal Botts / Michelle Edwards	South Africa	

=== Mixed doubles ===
No.	Rank	Players	NOC	Note
1	1	Nova Widianto / Liliyana Natsir	Indonesia	
2	2	Zheng Bo / Gao Ling	China	
3	3	Flandy Limpele / Vita Marissa	Indonesia	
4	4	He Hanbin / Yu Yang	China	
5	6	Nathan Robertson / Gail Emms	Great Britain	
6	7	Sudket Prapakamol / Saralee Thungthongkam	Thailand	
7	8	Anthony Clark / Donna Kellogg	Great Britain	
8	9	Thomas Laybourn / Kamilla Rytter Juhl	Denmark	
9	10	Lee Yong-dae / Lee Hyo-jung	South Korea	
10	11	Han Sang-hoon / Hwang Yu-mi	South Korea	
11	12	Robert Mateusiak / Nadieżda Kostiuczyk	Poland	
12	13	Kristof Hopp / Birgit Overzier	Germany	
13	14	Hendri Kurniawan Saputra / Li Yujia	Singapore	
—	21	Howard Bach / Eva Lee	United States	
14	31	Craig Cooper / Renee Flavell	New Zealand	
15	42	Mike Beres / Valerie Loker	Canada	
16	75	Georgie Cupidon / Juliette Ah-Wan	Seychelles	
