= Nathalie Descamps =

Belgian badminton player

Personal information
- Born: 5 January 1983 (age 43) Bilzen, Belgium
- Height: 1.67 m (5 ft 6 in)

Sport
- Country: Belgium
- Sport: Badminton
- Handedness: Right

Women's & mixed doubles
- Highest ranking: 32 (XD)
- BWF profile
Medal record
Badminton
Representing Belgium
European Championships
Bronze medal – third place	Manchester 2010	Mixed doubles

Nathalie Descamps (born 5 January 1983 in Bilzen) is a right-handed badminton player from Belgium. Until 2010, she has won 17 Belgian National Badminton Championships. Descamps also won the bronze medal at the 2010 European Badminton Championships in the mixed doubles event partnered with Wouter Claes.

== Career ==
Descamps currently plays for French First Division Club LUC Badminton Lille located in Lille.

She is currently ranked on place 108 (28 September 2008) in the Women's singles world ranking. In Belgium she is ranked number 1.

Descamps was selected for the European Players Olympic Forum 2008 (EPOF). In 2008, she received an invitation from the Badminton World Federation to participate to the 2008 Beijing Olympic Games, but the Belgian Olympic Committee uses different selection criteria and decided not to withhold her selection.

During her international career, she participated in four consecutive European Championships. Her best result was a bronze medal in Mixed doubles (together with partner Wouter Claes) during the 2010 European Badminton Championships. This was the first Belgian medal ever won on a European Championship.

=== Clubs ===
Year	Club	Division	City	Country
2007–2008	LUC Badminton Lille	1st National	Lille	France
2008–2009	Webacsa	1st National	Wellen	Belgium
2009–2010	LUC Badminton Lille	1st National	Lille	France

== Achievements ==
=== European Championships ===
Mixed doubles
Year	Venue	Partner	Opponent	Score	Result
2010	Manchester Evening News Arena; Manchester, England	(Belgium) Wouter Claes	(Denmark) Thomas Laybourn (Denmark) Kamilla Rytter Juhl	8–21, 14–21	Bronze

=== BWF International Challenge/Series ===
Women's doubles
Year	Tournament	Partner	Opponent	Score	Result
2008	Czech International	(Belgium) Séverine Corvilain	(Denmark) Helle Nielsen (Denmark) Marie Røpke	14–21, 15–21	(silver) Runner-up
2008	Spanish Open	(Scotland) Jillie Cooper	(Indonesia) Shendy Puspa Irawati (Indonesia) Meiliana Jauhari	10–21, 10–21	(silver) Runner-up

Mixed doubles
Year	Tournament	Partner	Opponent	Score	Result
2010	Banuinvest International	(Belgium) Wouter Claes	(Singapore) Chayut Triyachart (Singapore) Yao Lei	13–21, 21–23	(silver) Runner-up
2009	Belgian International	(Belgium) Wouter Claes	(England) Marcus Ellis (England) Heather Olver	9–21, 23–25	(silver) Runner-up
2008	European Circuit Finals	(Belgium) Wouter Claes	(Russia) Alexander Nikolaenko (Russia) Nina Vislova	7–21, 19–21	(silver) Runner-up
2008	Spanish Open	(Belgium) Wouter Claes	(Indonesia) Rendra Wijaya (Indonesia) Meiliana Jauhari	14–21, 18–21	(silver) Runner-up
2008	Austrian International	(Belgium) Wouter Claes	(China) Zhang Yi (China) Cai Jiani	18–21, 18–21	(silver) Runner-up
2007	Irish International	(Belgium) Wouter Claes	(United States) Howard Bach (United States) Eva Lee	10–21, 13–21	(silver) Runner-up
2007	Croatian International	(Belgium) Wouter Claes	(Poland) Adam Cwalina (Poland) Małgorzata Kurdelska	21–13, 16–21, 21–13	(gold) Winner
2006	Irish International	(Belgium) Wouter Claes	(Netherlands) Ruud Bosch (Netherlands) Ginny Severien	14–21, 21–17, 21–17	(gold) Winner

BWF International Challenge tournament
BWF International Series tournament

=== National ===
- 2002: Winner Belgian National Championship women's doubles (together with partner Veerle Rakels)
- 2003: Winner Belgian National Championship women's doubles (together with partner Veerle Rakels)
- 2004: Winner Belgian National Championship women's singles
- 2005: Winner Belgian National Championship women's singles, women's doubles (together with partner Katrien Claes), and mixed doubles (together with partner Wouter Claes)
- 2006: Winner Belgian National Championship women's singles, women's doubles (together with partner Sofie Robbrecht), and mixed doubles (together with partner Wouter Claes)
- 2007: Winner Belgian National Championship women's singles, women's doubles (together with partner Sabine Devooght), and mixed doubles (together with partner Wouter Claes)
- 2008: Winner Belgian National Championship Women's singles, mixed doubles (together with partner Wouter Claes)
- 2009: Winner Belgian National Championship women's singles, mixed doubles (together with partner Wouter Claes), winner of the Belgian National Badminton League with her team Webacsa
- 2010: Winner Belgian National Championship Mixed doubles (together with partner Wouter Claes)
