= 2021 BWF World Senior Championships – 45+ =

Tournament details
- Dates: 28 November 2021 – 4 December 2021
- Edition: 10
- Level: International
- Competitors: 223 from 30 nations
- Venue: Palacio de los Deportes Carolina Marín
- Location: Huelva, Spain

Champions
- Men's singles: (Denmark) Gregers Schytt
- Women's singles: (Netherlands) Georgy van Soerland-Trouerbach
- Men's doubles: (India) K. A. Aneesh (India) Vijay Lancy Mascarenhas
- Women's doubles: (Netherlands) Marielle van der Woerdt (Netherlands) Georgy van Soerland-Trouerbach
- Mixed doubles: (Netherlands) Gerben Bruijstens (Netherlands) Georgy van Soerland-Trouerbach

These are the results of 2021 BWF World Senior Championships' 45+ events.

== Men's singles ==
1. (Portugal) Fernando Silva (fourth round)
2. (France) Christophe Lionne (fourth round)
3. (India) K. A. Aneesh (fourth round)
4. (Denmark) Carsten Loesch (quarter-finals)
5. (Austria) Reinhard Hechenberger (third round)
6. (England) Carl Jennings (quarter-finals)
7. (Denmark) Johnny Hast Hansen (fourth round)
8. (Denmark) Morten Aarup (third round)
9. (Netherlands) Stan de Lange (third round)
10. (Ukraine) Vladislav Druzchenko (withdrew)
11. (Scotland) Mark Mackay (bronze medalist)
12. (Germany) Björn Schneider (second round)
13. (Sweden) Ulf Svenson (silver medalist)
14. (France) Fabrice Bernabé (withdrew)
15. (Sweden) Mikael Nilsson (fourth round)
16. (Denmark) Gregers Schytt (gold medalist)

=== Finals ===
Quarter-finals
9/16	(Denmark) Gregers Schytt	21	21
5/8	(England) Carl Jennings	13	5
3/4	(Denmark) Carsten Loesch	14	20
(Spain) Abel Hernández	21	22
(Austria) Harald Hochgatterer	18	10
9/16	(Scotland) Mark Mackay	21	21
9/16	(Sweden) Ulf Svenson	21	21
(England) Kenton Jones	16	15

Semi-finals
9/16	(Denmark) Gregers Schytt	21	21
(Spain) Abel Hernández	14	11
9/16	(Scotland) Mark Mackay	19	17
9/16	(Sweden) Ulf Svenson	21	21

Final
9/16	(Denmark) Gregers Schytt	21	21
9/16	(Sweden) Ulf Svenson	11	10

=== Top half ===
==== Section 1 ====
First round
(India) R Khandelwal	21	21
(Chinese Taipei) Huang C-l	17	14
(Sri Lanka) R Samaratunga	13	13
(Germany) A Schacht	21	21

Second round
1	(Portugal) F Silva	21	21
(France) N Louis	8	10
(Austria) R Bauer	11	15
(India) R Khandelwal	21	21
9/16	(Denmark) G Schytt	21	21
(Ukraine) T Karpov	0	4
(Spain) S Martínez	13	14
(Germany) A Schacht	21	21

Third round
1	(Portugal) F Silva	21	21
(India) R Khandelwal	8	8
9/16	(Denmark) G Schytt	21	21
(Germany) A Schacht	11	11

Fourth round
1	(Portugal) F Silva	13	9
9/16	(Denmark) G Schytt	21	21

==== Section 2 ====
First round
(Russia) P Shorin	21	21
(Sri Lanka) N Jayamanne	7	4
(Spain) A Brao	5	12
(Germany) P Freitag	21	21
(Scotland) F McCulloch	7
(Netherlands) M Gouw	10^{r}

Second round
(Czech Republic) V Vlk	16	10
(Russia) P Shorin	21	21
9/16	(Sweden) M Nilsson	21	21
(Germany) P Freitag	7	12
(India) H Patel	12	19
(Scotland) F McCulloch	21	21

Third round
5/8	(England) C Jennings	21	21
(Russia) P Shorin	11	5
9/16	(Sweden) M Nilsson	21	21
(Scotland) F McCulloch	5	2

Fourth round
5/8	(England) C Jennings	w	/	o
9/16	(Sweden) M Nilsson

==== Section 3 ====
First round
(Spain) M Acero	8	4
(Sweden) J Hård	21	21
(Lithuania) S Stravinskas	21	21
(Sri Lanka) S Thalwattegedara	11	14

Second round
3/4	(Denmark) C Loesch	21	21
(Netherlands) R Otto	14	11
(Poland) K Walenda	19	19
(Sweden) J Hård	21	21
9/16	(Germany) B Schneider	17	20
(India) Kannan S.S	21	22
(Switzerland) S Knöpfli	21	25
(Lithuania) S Stravinskas	16	23

Third round
3/4	(Denmark) C Loesch	23	14	21
(Sweden) J Hård	21	21	18
(India) Kannan S.S	21	21
(Switzerland) S Knöpfli	8	10

Fourth round
3/4	(Denmark) C Loesch	21	18	21
(India) Kannan S.S	14	21	18

==== Section 4 ====
First round
(Russia) M Kuddus	13	21	21
(Germany) D Fischer	21	13	15
(India) D Saxena	21	21
(Ukraine) Y Repiakh	13	14

Second round
5/8	(Austria) R Hechenberger	22	21
(Sweden) R Magnusson	20	15
(Denmark) H Pøhler	21	21
(Russia) M Kuddus	3	8
9/16	(France) F Bernabé
(India) D Saxena	w	/	o

Third round
5/8	(Austria) R Hechenberger	13	9
(Denmark) H Pøhler	21	21
(India) D Saxena	15	12
(Spain) A Hernández	21	21

Fourth round
(Denmark) H Pøhler	21	20
(Spain) A Hernández	23	22

=== Bottom half ===
==== Section 5 ====
First round
(Germany) C Hofweber	11	11
(Austria) H Hochgatterer	21	21
(Finland) T Kajava	21	18	24
(India) K Madanant	9	21	22
(Portugal) M Gloria	21	21
(Luxembourg) S Schockmel	8	10

Second round
(Austria) H Hochgatterer	21	21
(Spain) R del Cueto	17	12
(Finland) T Kajava	6	17
9/16	(Netherlands) S de Lange	21	21
(Portugal) M Gloria	21	21
(Sri Lanka) Jayaweera M	13	4
(France) J Renaudeau	19	12
5/8	(Denmark) M Aarup	21	21

Third round
(Austria) H Hochgatterer	21	14	21
9/16	(Netherlands) S de Lange	18	21	18
(Portugal) M Gloria	21	21
5/8	(Denmark) M Aarup	17	11

Fourth round
(Austria) H Hochgatterer	21	10	21
(Portugal) M Gloria	17	21	12

==== Section 6 ====
First round
(Ukraine) I Bak	19	17
(Sri Lanka) S Wickramasinghe	21	21
(France) T Foulon	21	21
(England) S Baker	5	6

Second round
(Sri Lanka) S Wickramasinghe	16	11
(Denmark) K Herløv	21	21
(France) T Foulon	9	12
9/16	(Scotland) M Mackay	21	21
(Estonia) T Vallikivi	13	13
(Germany) N Denzer	21	21
(Sweden) J Melkeraaen	21	23	8
3/4	(India) K. A. Aneesh	23	21	21

Third round
(Denmark) K Herløv	4	4
9/16	(Scotland) M Mackay	21	21
(Germany) N Denzer	22	6	9
3/4	(India) K. A. Aneesh	20	21	21

Fourth round
9/16	(Scotland) M Mackay	19	21	21
3/4	(India) K. A. Aneesh	21	8	15

==== Section 7 ====
First round
(Germany) O von Kempen	21	21
(Russia) V Tarasov	13	10
(Spain) D de la Cruz	21	21
(Switzerland) C Baumgartner	19	12
(Norway) V Næss	21	13	16
(India) J Rajkumar	16	21	21

Second round
(Germany) O von Kempen	14	21	21
(Austria) A Sudarma	21	8	18
(Spain) D de la Cruz	11	10
9/16	(Sweden) U Svenson	21	21
(India) J Rajkumar	11	14
(Sri Lanka) S J de Silva	21	21
(Czech Republic) J Port	9	21	14
5/8	(Denmark) J Hast Hansen	21	12	21

Third round
(Germany) O von Kempen	10	16
9/16	(Sweden) U Svenson	21	21
(Sri Lanka) S J de Silva	10	9
5/8	(Denmark) J Hast Hansen	21	21

Fourth round
9/16	(Sweden) U Svenson	10	23	21
5/8	(Denmark) J Hast Hansen	21	21	17

==== Section 8 ====
First round
(Germany) B Schwarz	21	21
(Spain) J Gómez	11	7
(Sweden) A Hedin	21	14	21
(Belgium) J Van den Brande	18	21	12

Second round
(Germany) B Schwarz	19	14
(India) J T. Antony	21	21
(Sweden) A Hedin	10	11
(Netherlands) E-J de Keijer	21	21
(Sri Lanka) A U P J Samarakoon Miriyagodage	16	21	18
2	(France) C Lionne	21	17	21

Third round
(India) J T. Antony	21	12	16
(England) K Jones	19	21	21
(Netherlands) E-J de Keijer	15	8
2	(France) C Lionne	21	21

Fourth round
(England) K Jones	18	21	21
2	(France) C Lionne	21	7	17

== Women's singles ==
=== Seeds ===
1. (Netherlands) Georgy van Soerland-Trouebrach (gold medalist)
2. (England) Rebecca Pantaney (silver medalist)
3. (Denmark) Majken Asmussen (bronze medalist)
4. (Netherlands) Marielle van der Woedrt (third round)
5. (Spain) María Jesús Almagro (quarter-finals)
6. (Sweden) Eva Lindqvist (second round)
7. (Bulgaria) Reni Molla-Hassan (second round)
8. (Switzerland) Fränzi Striebel (quarter-finals)

=== Finals ===
Semi-finals
1	(Netherlands) Georgy van Soerland-Trouerbach	21	21
3/4	(Denmark) Majken Asmussen	11	16
(Denmark) Janne Vang Nielsen	21	10	19
2	(England) Rebecca Pantaney	16	21	21

Final
1	(Netherlands) Georgy van Soerland-Trouerbach	21	21
2	(England) Rebecca Pantaney	12	14

=== Top half ===
==== Section 1 ====
First round
(France) S Thomas	21	18	21
(Denmark) B Pedersen	14	21	14

Second round
1	(Netherlands) G van Soerland-Trouerbach	21	21
(Spain) M J Martínez	3	1
(Norway) B Sotnes	12	21
(France) S Thomas	21	23
5/8	(Switzerland) F Striebel	21	21
(Spain) E M Insua	4	5
(India) M Goel	7	12
(Germany) S Weisbarth	21	21

Third round
1	(Netherlands) G van Soerland-Trouerbach	21	21
(France) S Thomas	2	11
5/8	(Switzerland) F Striebel	21	21
(Germany) S Weisbarth	16	9

Quarter-finals
1	(Netherlands) G van Soerland-Trouerbach	21	21
5/8	(Switzerland) F Striebel	7	3

==== Section 2 ====
First round
(Spain) C Lamas	21	21
(Germany) S Pietz	12	11

Second round
3/4	(Denmark) M Asmussen	21	22
(India) P Sangani	10	20
(France) S Le Pimpec	21	21
(Spain) C Lamas	13	12
5/8	(Sweden) E Lindqvist	16	8
(Iceland) E Nielsen	21	21
(Spain) T Vazquez	21	21
(Switzerland) N Siegenthaler	6	8

Third round
3/4	(Denmark) M Asmussen	21	21
(France) S Le Pimpec	18	11
(Iceland) E Nielsen	21	21
(Spain) T Vazquez	12	10

Quarter-finals
3/4	(Denmark) M Asmussen	21	13	22
(Iceland) E Nielsen	19	21	20

=== Bottom half ===
==== Section 3 ====
First round
(Romania) A M Popa	21	21
(Spain) M Sanchez	19	7
(Germany) P Schlüter	6	15
(Denmark) J V Nielsen	21	21
(India) M Srivastava	15	11
(France) H Brétillon	21	21

Second round
(Romania) A M Popa	21	21
(India) A Maheshwari	10	2
(Denmark) J V Nielsen	21	21
5/8	(Bulgaria) R Molla-Hassan	17	5
(France) H Brétillon	21	21
(Austria) U Edelmüller	14	12
(Spain) B Martín	10	8
3/4	(Netherlands) M van der Woerdt	21	21

Third round
(Romania) A M Popa	9	7
(Denmark) J V Nielsen	21	21
(France) H Brétillon	w	/	o
3/4	(Netherlands) M van der Woerdt

Quarter-finals
(Denmark) J V Nielsen	21	21
(France) H Brétillon	15	16

==== Section 4 ====
First round
(Germany) C Paulsen	23	21
(India) U Thapa	21	14
(Spain) G Cardigonde	15	9
(Sweden) D Harfman Bromée	21	21

Second round
(Germany) C Paulsen	15	22	21
(France) S le Bourg	21	20	10
(Denmark) A-L Hansen	20	21	17
5/8	(Spain) M J Almagro	22	18	21
(Sweden) D Harfman Bromée	21	21
(India) S Misra	10	12
(Switzerland) M-C Beaudoin-Ekstrand
2	(England) R Pantaney	w	/	o

Third round
(Germany) C Paulsen	10	11
5/8	(Spain) M J Almagro	21	21
(Sweden) D Harfman Bromée	14	10
2	(England) R Pantaney	21	21

Quarter-finals
5/8	(Spain) M J Almagro	8	11
2	(England) R Pantaney	21	21

== Men's doubles ==
=== Seeds ===
1. (Sweden) Mikael Nilsson / Ulf Svenson (bronze medalist)
2. (Denmark) Morten Aarup / Carsten Loesch (quarter-finals)
3. (Chinese Taipei) Jong Yi-huang / Wu Chang-jun (second round)
4. (India) K. A. Aneesh / Vijay Lancy Mascarenhas (gold medalist)
5. (India) Joy T. Antony / Pradeep Kumar K. S. (third round)
6. (England) Carl Jennings / Mark King (quarter-finals)
7. (Estonia) Taimar Talts / Tanel Talts (third round)
8. (Denmark) Johnny Hast Hansen / (Scotland) Mark Mackay (silver medalist)

=== Finals ===
Semi-finals
1	(Sweden) Mikael Nilsson (Sweden) Ulf Svenson	20	13
3/4	(India) K. A. Aneesh (India) Vijay Lancy Mascarenhas	21	21
5/8	(Denmark) Johnny Hast Hansen (Scotland) Mark Mackay	21	21	21
(Netherlands) Gerben Bruijstens (Netherlands) Stan de Lange	9	23	12

Final
3/4	(India) K. A. Aneesh (India) Vijay Lancy Mascarenhas	21	21
5/8	(Denmark) Johnny Hast Hansen (Scotland) Mark Mackay	18	16

=== Top half ===
==== Section 1 ====
First round
(India) R Bhatia (India) S P Panemangalore	21	18	21
(Germany) N Denzer (Germany) P Freitag	16	21	19
(Spain) G Clark (Spain) M Serrano	21	17	21
SUB	(Austria) H Hochgatterer (Netherlands) R Schara	14	21	19
(Denmark) K Herløv (Denmark) G Schytt	18	18
(India) P Ekande (India) S Patil	21	21

Second round
1	(Sweden) M Nilsson (Sweden) U Svenson	21	21
(India) R Bhatia (India) S P Panemangalore	6	12
(Spain) G Clark (Spain) M Serrano	21	21
(Scotland) R Campbell (Scotland) F McCulloch	13	16
(India) P Ekande (India) S Patil	21	21
(Sri Lanka) Jayaweera M (Sri Lanka) R Sanaratunga	3	13

Third round
1	(Sweden) M Nilsson (Sweden) U Svenson	21	21
(Spain) G Clark (Spain) M Serrano	14	8
5/8	(England) C Jennings (England) M King	21	21
(India) P Ekande (India) S Patil	14	15

Quarter-finals
1	(Sweden) M Nilsson (Sweden) U Svenson	21	14	21
5/8	(England) C Jennings (England) M King	15	21	19

==== Section 2 ====
First round
(Germany) D Fischer (Germany) B Schneider	21	21
(Spain) J Campiña (Spain) F J Herrera	5	7
(Poland) R Bieganowski (Poland) K Walenda	21	21
(Russia) P Shorin (Lithuania) S Stravinskas	12	18
(Netherlands) E-J de Keijzer (Netherlands) R Otto	21	21
(Spain) J Gómez (Spain) J C Padilla	11	15

Second round
3/4	(India) K. A. Aneesh (India) V L Mascarenhas	21	19	21
(France) J Jouhanet (France) C Lionne	19	21	12
(Germany) D Fischer (Germany) B Schneider	21	21
(Poland) R Bieganowski (Poland) K Walenda	11	14
5/8	(Estonia) Tai Talts (Estonia) Tan Talts	21	21
(Austria) R Bauer (Austria) R Hechenberger	13	12
(Switzerland) C Baumgartner (Switzerland) S Knöpfli	13	9
(Netherlands) E-J de Keijzer (Netherlands) R Otto	21	21

Third round
3/4	(India) K. A. Aneesh (India) V L Mascarenhas	21	21
(Germany) D Fischer (Germany) B Schneider	14	14
5/8	(Estonia) Tai Talts (Estonia) Tan Talts	13	14
(Netherlands) E-J de Keijzer (Netherlands) R Otto	21	21

Quarter-finals
3/4	(India) K. A. Aneesh (India) V L Mascarenhas	25	21
(Netherlands) E-J de Keijzer (Netherlands) R Otto	23	13

=== Bottom half ===
==== Section 3 ====
First round
(Sri Lanka) S Pradeep (Sri Lanka) A U P J Samarakoon Miriyagodage	23	8	15
(India) A Mathur (India) R Singh	21	21	21
(Sweden) A Hedin (Sweden) R Magnusson	13	11
(Spain) A Beltran (Spain) A Hernández	21	21
(Denmark) H Pøhler (France) J Renaudeau	21	21
(Iceland) V Magnússon (France) C Vu	11	11
(Germany) A Bertko (Germany) F Heuwing	11	14
5/8	(Denmark) J Hast Hansen (Scotland) M Mackay	21	21
(India) Ravi Kiran P. R. V. K. N. (India) V V V P Vadlamudi	16	19
(Germany) A Schacht (Germany) B Schwarz	21	21
(Spain) F Alberca (Spain) A Bravo	14	16
(Ukraine) I Bak (Ukraine) Y Repiakh	21	21
(France) T Foulon (France) N Louis	14	21
(England) K Jones (England) C Spice	21	23

Second round
(India) A Mathur (India) R Singh	14	21	21
(Spain) A Beltran (Spain) A Hernández	21	17	15
(Denmark) H Pøhler (France) J Renaudeau	10	10
5/8	(Denmark) J Hast Hansen (Scotland) M Mackay	21	21
(Germany) A Schacht (Germany) B Schwarz	21	21
(Ukraine) I Bak (Ukraine) Y Repiakh	14	16
(England) K Jones (England) C Spice	21	21
3/4	(Chinese Taipei) Jong Y-h (Chinese Taipei) Wu C-j	14	19

Third round
(India) A Mathur (India) R Singh	9	7
5/8	(Denmark) J Hast Hansen (Scotland) M Mackay	21	21
(Germany) A Schacht (Germany) B Schwarz	14	15
(England) K Jones (England) C Spice	21	21

Quarter-finals
5/8	(Denmark) J Hast Hansen (Scotland) M Mackay	21	21
(England) K Jones (England) C Spice	7	8

==== Section 4 ====
First round
(Spain) G López (Spain) J C Pérez	9	12
(Norway) T Helander (Norway) V Næss	21	21
(Netherlands) G Bruijstens (Netherlands) S de Lange	21	21
(Germany) G Hofweber (Germany) O von Kempen	9	15
(Sri Lanka) N Jayamanne (Sri Lanka) S Thalwattegedara	11	10
(Estonia) A Hoop (Estonia) T Vallikivi	21	21
(Sweden) J Hård (Sweden) J Melkeraaen	21	21
(Austria) A Sudarma (Austria) E Tomes	8	9
(Spain) M Acero (Spain) S Martínez	15	14
(Switzerland) H da Costa (Portugal) M Gloria	21	21
(Sri Lanka) S J de Silva (Sri Lanka) G Kamal Jagadananda	21	21
(Russia) M Kuddus (Russia) V Tarasov	7	8

Second round
(Norway) T Helander (Norway) V Næss	9	9
(Netherlands) G Bruijstens (Netherlands) S de Lange	21	21
(Estonia) A Hoop (Estonia) T Vallikivi	8	12
5/8	(India) J T. Antony (India) P Kumar K. S.	21	21
(Sweden) J Hård (Sweden) J Melkeraaen	21	21
(Switzerland) H da Costa (Portugal) M Gloria	13	9
(Sri Lanka) S J de Silva (Sri Lanka) G Kamal Jagadananda	15	21	12
2	(Denmark) M Aarup (Denmark) C Loesch	21	12	21

Third round
(Netherlands) G Bruijstens (Netherlands) S de Lange	21	21
5/8	(India) J T. Antony (India) P Kumar K. S.	17	19
(Sweden) J Hård (Sweden) J Melkeraaen	17	16
2	(Denmark) M Aarup (Denmark) C Loesch	21	21

Quarter-finals
(Netherlands) G Bruijstens (Netherlands) S de Lange	20	21	21
2	(Denmark) M Aarup (Denmark) C Loesch	22	19	11

== Women's doubles ==
=== Seeds ===
1. (Netherlands) Marielle van der Woerdt / Georgy van Soerland-Trouerbach (gold medalists)
2. (Denmark) Majken Asmussen / (Scotland) Lynne Campbell (bronze medalists)
3. (Denmark) Janne Vang Nielsen / Birgitte Pedersen (silver medalists)
4. (England) Rebecca Pantaney / Lynne Swan (bronze medalists)

=== Finals ===
Semi-finals
1	(Netherlands) Marielle van der Woerdt (Netherlands) Georgy van Soerland-Trouerbach	21	21
3/4	(England) Rebecca Pantaney (England) Lynne Swan	9	17
3/4	(Denmark) Janne Vang Nielsen (Denmark) Birgette Pedersen	21	21
2	(Denmark) Majken Asmussen (Scotland) Lynne Campbell	14	19

Final
1	(Netherlands) Marielle van der Woerdt (Netherlands) Georgy van Soerland-Trouerbach	21	21
3/4	(Denmark) Janne Vang Nielsen (Denmark) Birgette Pedersen	16	15

=== Top half ===
==== Section 1 ====
First round
(India) S Das (India) S Sajan	21	21
(Spain) M Alarcon (Spain) M J Martínez	9	13
(Switzerland) N Siegenthaler (Switzerland) R Syed	10	10
(Germany) K Hockemeyer (Germany) C Paulsen	21	21
(Estonia) L Pettifer (Estonia) P van de Runstraat-Kärt	11	17
(Denmark) A-L Hansen (Denmark) A G. Thomsen	21	21

Second round
1	(Netherlands) M van der Woerdt (Netherlands) G van Soerland-Trouerbach	21	21
(India) S Das (India) S Sajan	5	4
(Germany) K Hockemeyer (Germany) C Paulsen	12	22	17
(Denmark) A-L Hansen (Denmark) A G. Thomsen	21	20	21

Quarter-finals
1	(Netherlands) M van der Woerdt (Netherlands) G van Soerland-Trouerbach	21	21
(Denmark) A-L Hansen (Denmark) A G. Thomsen	15	10

==== Section 2 ====
First round
(Spain) M Sanchez (Spain) T Vazquez	21	21
(Austria) U Edelmüller (Latvia) A Mētra	15	16
(France) S le Bourg (France) V Ouiste	10	17
(Germany) C Ern-Joachim (Bulgaria) R Molla-Hassan	21	21
(Denmark) L Herbst (Denmark) M Nielsen	21	21
(India) S Misra (India) U Thapa	10	10

Second round
3/4	(England) R Pantaney (England) L Swan	21	21
(Spain) M Sanchez (Spain) T Vazquez	6	9
(Germany) C Ern-Joachim (Bulgaria) R Molla-Hassan	13	21	12
(Denmark) L Herbst (Denmark) M Nielsen	21	18	21

Quarter-finals
3/4	(England) R Pantaney (England) L Swan	18	21	21
(Denmark) L Herbst (Denmark) M Nielsen	21	13	6

=== Bottom half ===
==== Section 3 ====
First round
(England) L Culyer (England) T Hutchinson	21	21
(Norway) B Sotnes (Norway) K Thomt	7	7
(India) D N Joshi (India) C Navare	21	21
(Spain) G Cardigonde (Spain) C Stewart	16	19
(Switzerland) F Striebel (Switzerland) A Treu	21	21
(India) M Goel (India) M Srivastava	8	9

Second round
(England) L Culyer (England) T Hutchinson	21	21
(India) D N Joshi (India) C Navare	11	19
(Switzerland) F Striebel (Switzerland) A Treu	17	7
3/4	(Denmark) J V Nielsen (Denmark) B Pedersen	21	21

Quarter-finals
(England) L Culyer (England) T Hutchinson	21	17	12
3/4	(Denmark) J V Nielsen (Denmark) B Pedersen	18	21	21

==== Section 4 ====
First round
(England) I Platts-Mills (England) C Wheller	8	22	10
(France) S Le Pimpec (Germany) M Meyer	21	20	21
(India) S Khanduri (India) V Subramanian	6	8
(Estonia) T Tombak (Estonia) M Velga	21	21
(France) G Brétillon (France) S Thomas	11	14
SUB	(Germany) S Weisbarth (Sweden) D Harfman Bromée	21	21

Second round
(France) S Le Pimpec (Germany) M Meyer	13	20
(Estonia) T Tombak (Estonia) M Velga	21	22
SUB	(Germany) S Weisbarth (Sweden) D Harfman Bromée	9	9
2	(Denmark) M Asmussen (Scotland) L Campbell	21	21

Quarter-finals
(Estonia) T Tombak (Estonia) M Velga	15	11
2	(Denmark) M Asmussen (Scotland) L Campbell	21	21

== Mixed doubles ==
=== Seeds ===
1. (Russia) Vadim Nazarov / Olga Kuznetsova (quarter-finals)
2. (Denmark) Morten Aarup / Lene Struwe Andersen (silver medalists)
3. (Portugal) Fernando Silva / Maria Gomes (bronze medalists)
4. (Denmark) Carsten Loesch / (England) Elizabeth Austin (quarter-finals)
5. (Netherlands) Gerben Bruijstens / Georgy van Soerland-Trouerbach (gold medalists)
6. (Denmark) Kennet Herløv / Birgitte Pedersen (quarter-finals)
7. (Sweden) Mikael Nilsson / Dora Harfman Bromée (quarter-finals)
8. (Denmark) Anders Steenkjær / Janne Vang Nielsen (bronze medalists)

=== Finals ===
Semi-finals
5/8	(Netherlands) Gerben Bruijstens (Netherlands) Georgy van Soerland-Trouerbach	21	21
3/4	(Portugal) Fernando Silva (Portugal) Maria Gomes	15	9
5/8	(Denmark) Anders Steenkjær (Denmark) Janne Vang Nielsen	12	14
2	(Denmark) Morten Aarup (Denmark) Lene Struwe Andersen	21	21

Final
5/8	(Netherlands) Gerben Bruijstens (Netherlands) Georgy van Soerland-Trouerbach	21	21
2	(Denmark) Morten Aarup (Denmark) Lene Struwe Andersen	11	12

=== Top half ===
==== Section 1 ====
First round
(Estonia) T Vallikivi (Estonia) T Tombak	10	17
(India) Parimelazhagan P. J. (India) Banu S.	21	21
(Spain) J Gómez (Spain) M Sanchez	10	17
(Denmark) H Pøhler (Denmark) M Asmussen	21	21
(Italy) M Fuda (Italy) L Woravijitchaikul	6	11
(Scotland) A McMillan (Denmark) A-L Hansen	21	21
(India) A K Sharma (India) M Srivastava	21	21
(Sweden) M Gustafsson (Sweden) E Lindqvist	12	19
(France) C Vu (France) V Ouiste	11	12
(Germany) A Bertko (Germany) S Weisbarth	21	21
(England) C Spice (England) C Wheller	21	21
(Spain) F J Castilla (Spain) C Lamas	14	14

Second round
1	(Russia) V Nazarov (Russia) O Kuznetsova	21	21
(India) Parimelazhagan P. J. (India) Banu S.	11	13
(Denmark) H Pøhler (Denmark) M Asmussen	21	21
(Scotland) A McMillan (Denmark) A-L Hansen	17	14
5/8	(Netherlands) G Bruijstens (Netherlands) G van Soerland-Trouerbach	21	21
(India) A K Sharma (India) M Srivastava	5	11
(Germany) A Bertko (Germany) S Weisbarth	21	21
(England) C Spice (England) C Wheller	7	11

Third round
1	(Russia) V Nazarov (Russia) O Kuznetsova	21	21
(Denmark) H Pøhler (Denmark) M Asmussen	12	16
5/8	(Netherlands) G Bruijstens (Netherlands) G van Soerland-Trouerbach	21	21
(Germany) A Bertko (Germany) S Weisbarth	18	15

Quarter-finals
1	(Russia) V Nazarov (Russia) O Kuznetsova	19	13
5/8	(Netherlands) G Bruijstens (Netherlands) G van Soerland-Trouerbach	21	21

==== Section 2 ====
First round
(Spain) M Acero (Spain) C Langrock	10	10
(France) J Renaudeau (France) H Brétillon	21	21
(India) M Utgikar (India) C Navare	21	21
(Germany) F Heuwing (Germany) K Hockemeyer	14	13
(Norway) T Helander (Norway) K Thomt	19	20
(England) S Baker (England) I Platts-Mills	21	22
(Germany) P Freitag (Germany) K Tröger	21	21
(Lithuania) A Kepežinskas (Lithuania) S Zinkevičienė	5	7
(Spain) J P Puertas (Spain) R Arcas	5	12
(Estonia) A Hoop (Estonia) L Pettifer	21	21

Second round
3/4	(Portugal) F Silva (Portugal) M Gomes	21	21
(France) J Renaudeau (France) H Brétillon	10	11
(India) M Utgikar (India) C Navare	15	21	21
(Austria) H Hochgatterer (Austria) U Edelmüller	21	12	12
5/8	(Denmark) K Herløv (Denmark) B Pedersen	21	21
(England) S Baker (England) I Platts-Mills	13	11
(Germany) P Freitag (Germany) K Tröger	22	21
(Estonia) A Hoop (Estonia) L Pettifer	20	15

Third round
3/4	(Portugal) F Silva (Portugal) M Gomes	21	21
(India) M Utgikar (India) C Navare	12	13
5/8	(Denmark) K Herløv (Denmark) B Pedersen	21	21
(Germany) P Freitag (Germany) K Tröger	15	11

Quarter-finals
3/4	(Portugal) F Silva (Portugal) M Gomes	21	20	21
5/8	(Denmark) K Herløv (Denmark) B Pedersen	19	22	11

=== Bottom half ===
==== Section 3 ====
First round
SUB	(Scotland) M Mackay (Germany) P Mews	21	21
(India) H Patel (India) R Mahadevia	13	8
(Germany) D Fischer (Germany) S Pietz	10	17
(Spain) A Rangil (Spain) E Sanz	21	21
(Sweden) J Melkeraaen (Sweden) A-M Wellendorph	9	14
(France) T Foulon (France) S Thomas	21	21
(Spain) F J Herrera (Spain) E Segarra	8	9
(Bulgaria) M Chavdarov (Romania) A M Popa	21	21
(France) N Louis (France) S le Bourg	14	16
(Netherlands) R Otto (Netherlands) P Landmeter	21	21
(India) D Saxena (India) A Durgpurohit	21	15	14
(Germany) O von Kempen (Germany) P Schlüter	12	21	21

Second round
SUB	(Scotland) M Mackay (Germany) P Mews	21	21
(Spain) A Rangil (Spain) E Sanz	14	12
(France) T Foulon (France) S Thomas	12	15
5/8	(Denmark) A Steenkjær (Denmark) J V Nielsen	21	21
(Bulgaria) M Chavdarov (Romania) A M Popa	14	21	18
(Netherlands) R Otto (Netherlands) P Landmeter	21	18	21
(Germany) O von Kempen (Germany) P Schlüter	21	9	12
3/4	(Denmark) C Loesch (England) E Austin	19	21	21

Third round
SUB	(Scotland) M Mackay (Germany) P Mews	21	11	16
5/8	(Denmark) A Steenkjær (Denmark) J V Nielsen	16	21	21
(Netherlands) R Otto (Netherlands) P Landmeter	15	17
3/4	(Denmark) C Loesch (England) E Austin	21	21

Quarter-finals
5/8	(Denmark) A Steenkjær (Denmark) J V Nielsen	21	21
3/4	(Denmark) C Loesch (England) E Austin	15	16

==== Section 4 ====
First round
(Estonia) Tan Talts (Estonia) P van de Runstraat-Kärt	16	12
(Netherlands) S de Lange (Netherlands) M van der Woerdt	21	21
(Netherlands) E-J de Keijzer (Norway) B Sotnes	14	21	23
(France) C Lionne (France) S Le Pimpec	21	19	21
(Scotland) R Campbell (Scotland) L Campbell	21	21
(Spain) G Clark (Spain) C Stewart	19	13
(Germany) B Schneider (Germany) C Paulseb	21	21
(Spain) A Beltran (Spain) M Llugany	11	8
(Austria) R Hechenberger (Switzerland) F Striebel	10	19
(England) K Jones (England) B Blair	21	21

Second round
(Netherlands) S de Lange (Netherlands) M van der Woerdt	21	17	21
(Netherlands) E-J de Keijzer (Norway) B Sotnes	16	21	11
(Scotland) R Campbell (Scotland) L Campbell	11	13
5/8	(Sweden) M Nilsson (Sweden) D Harfman Bromée	21	21
(Germany) B Schneider (Germany) C Paulseb	20	13
(England) K Jones (England) B Blair	22	21
(India) P Ekande (India) U Thapa	12	24	11
2	(Denmark) M Aarup (Denmark) L S Andersen	21	22	21

Third round
(Netherlands) S de Lange (Netherlands) M van der Woerdt	16	21	18
5/8	(Sweden) M Nilsson (Sweden) D Harfman Bromée	21	18	21
(England) K Jones (England) B Blair	21	18	19
2	(Denmark) M Aarup (Denmark) L S Andersen	19	21	21

Quarter-finals
5/8	(Sweden) M Nilsson (Sweden) D Harfman Bromée	17	17
2	(Denmark) M Aarup (Denmark) L S Andersen	21	21
