= Ruud Kuijten =

Belgian badminton player

Ruud Kuijten (born 7 October 1973 in Nuenen, Netherlands) is a male right-handed badminton player from Belgium. He has won several Belgian National Badminton Championships and participated for his country in Olympic Games.

== Biography ==
Born in the Netherlands, Kuijten changed his nationality later in his life to Belgian. For his new home nation, Kuijten took part in the 2000 Sydney Olympic Games.

== Career highlights ==
=== 1994 ===
- Winner Dutch National Championship Men's doubles (together with partner Joris van Soerland)

=== 1999 ===
- Winner Belgian National Championship Men's singles
- Winner Belgian National Championship Mixed doubles (together with partner Manon Albinus)
- Winner European Badminton Circuit Men's singles

=== 2000 ===
- Winner Belgian National Championship Men's singles
- Winner Belgian National Championship Mixed doubles (together with partner Manon Albinus)
- Participation Olympic Games Sydney 2000

=== 2001 ===
- Winner Belgian National Championship Men's singles

=== 2002 ===
- Winner Belgian National Championship Men's singles

=== 2003 ===
- Winner Belgian National Championship Men's singles

=== 2004 ===
- Winner Belgian National Championship Men's singles
- Winner Belgian National Championship Men's doubles (together with partner Wouter Claes)

=== 2005 ===
- Winner Belgian National Championship Men's singles
- Winner Belgian National Championship Men's doubles (together with partner Wouter Claes)
