= Belgian National Badminton Championships =

The Belgian National Badminton Championships is a tournament organized by the Belgian Badminton Federation to crown the best badminton players in Belgium. They are held since the season 1948/1949. In the initial years all five disciplines were not always played.

There is an international tournament in Belgium, the Belgian International, held since the season 1958/1959.

== Past winners ==
Year	Location	Men's singles	Women's singles	Men's doubles	Women's doubles	Mixed doubles
1948/1949		Robert Mommaerts	de Barry	L. St. Lawrence; J. B. Laidlaw	no competition	L. St. Lawrence; J. B. Laidlaw
1949/1950		Stan Joy	Nancy Penning	Stan Joy; J. B. Laidlaw	Nancy Penning; Boomer	Stan Joy; Nancy Penning
1950/1951		Stan Joy	Nancy Penning	Stan Joy; L. St. Lawrence	Nancy Joy; Nancy Penning	Stan Joy; Nancy Penning
1951/1952		Guy van Branteghem	Nancy Joy	Stan Joy; L. St. Lawrence	Nancy Joy; Nancy Penning	Stan Joy; Nancy Penning
1952/1953		Bernard Blake	Nancy Joy	B. Grouch; Guy van Branteghem	Nancy Joy; Nancy Penning	Stan Joy; Nancy Penning
1953/1954		Corky Murray	Nancy Joy	Stan Joy; L. St. Lawrence	Nancy Joy; Nancy Penning	Stan Joy; Nancy Penning
1954/1955		Guy van Branteghem	J. Boulet	Stan Joy; Bernard Blake	Nancy Joy; Nancy Penning	Stan Joy; Nancy Penning
1955/1956		Guy van Branteghem	J. Boulet	Guy van Branteghem; Jean Boulet	J. Boulet; J. Verplancke de Diepenhede	Faber; J. Boulet
1956/1957		Guy van Branteghem	J. Boulet	Guy van Branteghem; Jean Boulet	J. Boulet; Françoise Malevez	Guy van Branteghem; J. Boulet
1957/1958		Guy van Branteghem	J. Boulet	Claude Bar; Jack Stuart	J. Boulet; Françoise Malevez	Guy van Branteghem; J. Boulet
1958/1959		Guy van Branteghem	J. Boulet	Claude Bar; Jack Stuart	J. Boulet; Françoise Malevez	Guy van Branteghem; J. Boulet
1959/1960		Anton Verstoep	Bep Verstoep	Guy van Branteghem; Anton Verstoep	J. Boulet; Françoise Malevez	Anton Verstoep; Bep Verstoep
1960/1961		Anton Verstoep	Bep Verstoep	Jack Stuart; Herman Moens	Bep Verstoep; June Vander Willigen	Anton Verstoep; Bep Verstoep
1961/1962		Anton Verstoep	no competition	Guy van Branteghem; Anton Verstoep	no competition	Anton Verstoep; Bep Verstoep
1962/1963		Anton Verstoep	Bep Verstoep	Jack Stuart; Herman Moens	no competition	Herman Moens; June Vander Willigen
1963/1964		Anton Verstoep	June Vander Willigen	Roger van Meerbeek; Herman Moens	Bep Verstoep; June Vander Willigen	Herman Moens; June Vander Willigen
1964/1965		Herman Moens	Bep Verstoep	Roger van Meerbeek; Herman Moens	Bep Verstoep; June Jacques	Herman Moens; Bep Verstoep
1965/1966		Roger van Meerbeek	Bep Verstoep	Roger van Meerbeek; Herman Moens	Bep Verstoep; Gerda Moens	Herman Moens; Bep Verstoep
1966/1967		Roger van Meerbeek	June Jacques	Roger van Meerbeek; Herman Moens	June Jacques; Gerda Moens	Herman Moens; Gerda Moens
1967/1968		Herman Moens	June Jacques	Roger van Meerbeek; Herman Moens	June Jacques; Gerda Moens	Herman Moens; Gerda Moens
1968/1969		Roger van Meerbeek	June Jacques	Roger van Meerbeek; Herman Moens	June Jacques; Gerda Cairns	Herman Moens; Gerda Cairns
1969/1970		Herman Moens	no competition	Roger van Meerbeek; Herman Moens	no competition	Roger van Meerbeek; June Jacques
1970/1971		Herman Moens	June Jacques	Roger van Meerbeek; Herman Moens	June Jacques; Gerda Cairns	Herman Moens; Gerda Cairns
1971/1972		Herman Moens	Gerda Cairns	Roger van Meerbeek; Herman Moens	Anne Devillers; C. Remy	Herman Moens; Gerda Cairns
1972/1973		Daniel Gosset	June Jacques	Roger van Meerbeek; Herman Moens	June Jacques; Gerda Cairns	Herman Moens; Gerda Cairns
1973/1974		Michel Gosset	Kirsten Ballisager	Roger van Meerbeek; Herman Moens	Kirsten Ballisager; M. Raindorf	Herman Moens; Gerda Cairns
1974/1975		Michel Gosset	Kirsten Ballisager	Roger van Meerbeek; Herman Moens	Kirsten Ballisager; Françoise Kaiser	Herman Moens; Gerda Cairns
1975/1976		Daniel Gosset	Françoise Kaiser	Michel Gosset; Johannes Johari	Kirsten Ballisager; Françoise Kaiser	Herman Moens; Gerda Cairns
1976/1977		Daniel Gosset	Ruth Williams	Jean Pierre Bauduin; Benny Tan Ook Djie	Françoise Kaiser; Gerda Cairns	Herman Moens; Gerda Cairns
1977/1978		Jean Pierre Bauduin	Françoise Kaiser	Jean Pierre Bauduin; José Isasi	Ruth Williams; Maria Desy	José Isasi; Viviane Isasi
1978/1979		Jean Pierre Bauduin	FFrançoise Kaiser	Jean Pierre Bauduin; John Jaury	Nadine Vermeulen; Linda Drossaert	Dominique Kaiser; Françoise Kaiser
1979/1980		Jean Pierre Bauduin	Françoise Kaiser	Jean Pierre Bauduin; John Jaury	Ingrid Swiggers; Ingrid Rijcken	Patrick de Ruisseau; Ingrid Swiggers
1980/1981		Jean Pierre Bauduin	Ingrid Swiggers	Jean Pierre Bauduin; John Jaury	Ingrid Swiggers; Ingrid Rijcken	José Isasi; Viviane Isasi
1981/1982		Jan de Mulder	Ingrid Swiggers	Michel Bauduin; Christian Bene	Ingrid Swiggers; Ingrid Rijcken	Patrick de Ruisseau; Ingrid Swiggers
1982/1983		Jos Warmoes	Ingrid Swiggers	Jean Pierre Bauduin; Cristian Bene	Ingrid Swiggers; Marie-Christine Donnay	Jan de Mulder; Ingrid Rijcken
1983/1984		Eddy van Herbruggen	Ingrid Swiggers	Patrick de Ruisseau; Eddy van Herbruggen	Ingrid Swiggers; Greet van Haverbeke	Patrick de Ruisseau; Ingrid Swiggers
1984/1985		Jan de Mulder	Ingrid Swiggers	Jan de Mulder; Eddy van Herbruggen	Ingrid Swiggers; Linda Drossaert	Eddy van Herbruggen; Greet van Haverbeke
1985/1986		Eddy van Herbruggen	Ingrid Swiggers	Jan de Mulder; Eddy van Herbruggen	Ingrid Swiggers; Greet van Haverbeke	Yves de Negri; Nancy de Mey
1986/1987		Jan de Mulder	Ingrid Swiggers	Jan de Mulder; José Isasi	Ingrid Swiggers; Greet van Haverbeke	Eddy van Herbruggen; Greet van Haverbeke
1987/1988		Eddy van Herbruggen	Ingrid Swiggers	Jan de Mulder; Dario van Nauw	Ingrid Swiggers; Greet van Haverbeke	Filip Vigneron; Ingrid Swiggers
1988/1989		Jan de Mulder	Ingrid Swiggers	Jan de Mulder; Filip Vigneron	Ingrid Swiggers; Greet van Haverbeke	Filip Vigneron; Ingrid Swiggers
1989/1990		Eddy van Herbruggen	Isabelle Meuleman	Jan de Mulder; Filip Vigneron	Isabelle Meuleman; Marina Saubergs	Eddy van Herbruggen; Isabelle Meuleman
1990/1991		Jan de Mulder	Marie-Christine Donnay	Eddy van Herbruggen; Dario van Nauw	Ingrid Swiggers; Sabine Langenaekens	Filip Vigneron; Ingrid Swiggers
1991/1992		Pedro Vanneste	Annemie Buyse	Eddy van Herbruggen; Yves de Negri	Heidi Vrancken; Annemie Buyse	Pedro Vanneste; Annemie Buyse
1992/1993		Pedro Vanneste	Heidi Vrancken	Filip Vigneron; Yves de Negri	Ingrid Swiggers; Peggy Mampaey	Pedro Vanneste; Heidi Vrancken
1993/1994		Pedro Vanneste	Caroline Persyn	Van Bouwel; De Leeuw	Caroline Persyn; Peggy Mampaey	Pedro Vanneste; Heidi Vrancken
1994/1995		Pedro Vanneste	Peggy Mampaey	De Rijcke; Pedro Vanneste	Caroline Persyn; Peggy Mampaey	Dalli Cardillo; Peggy Mampaey
1995/1996		Pedro Vanneste	Caroline Persyn	Dalli Cardillo; Filip Vigneron	Caroline Persyn; Mallory Gosset	Pedro Vanneste; Mallory Gosset
1996/1997		Pedro Vanneste	Mallory Gosset	Pedro Vanneste; Alain Deleeuw	Mallory Gosset; Anetha Stamboliyska	David Vandewinkel; Peggy Mampaey
1997/1998		Pedro Vanneste	Mallory Gosset	Patrick Boonen; David Vandewinkel	Mallory Gosset; Manon Albinus	Wouter Claes; Manon Albinus
1998/1999		Ruud Kuijten	Peggy Mampaey	David Vandewinkel; Patrick Boonen	Peggy Mampaey; Manon Albinus	Ruud Kuijten; Manon Albinus
1999/2000		Ruud Kuijten	Peggy Mampaey	David Vandewinkel; Patrick Boonen	Peggy Mampaey; Manon Albinus	Ruud Kuijten; Manon Albinus
2000/2001		Ruud Kuijten	Hanny Setiani Juhari	Wouter Claes; Frederic Mawet	Peggy Mampaey; Manon Albinus	Wouter Claes; Manon Albinus
2001/2002		Ruud Kuijten	Elke Biesbrouck	Wouter Claes; Frederic Mawet	Veerle Rakels; Nathalie Descamps	Wouter Claes; Manon Albinus
2002/2003		Ruud Kuijten	Elke Biesbrouck	Wouter Claes; Frederic Mawet	Veerle Rakels; Nathalie Descamps	Dalli Cardillo; Veerle Rakels
2003/2004		Ruud Kuijten	Nathalie Descamps	Wouter Claes; Ruud Kuijten	Agnieszka Czerwinska; Sofie Robbrecht	Wouter Claes; Corina Herrle
2004/2005		Ruud Kuijten	Nathalie Descamps	Wouter Claes; Ruud Kuijten	Katrien Claes; Nathalie Descamps	Wouter Claes; Nathalie Descamps
2005/2006		Yuhan Tan	Nathalie Descamps	Wouter Claes; Frederic Mawet	Nathalie Descamps; Sofie Robbrecht	Wouter Claes; Nathalie Descamps
2006/2007		David Jaco	Nathalie Descamps	Wouter Claes; Frederic Mawet	Nathalie Descamps; Sabine Devooght	Wouter Claes; Nathalie Descamps
2007/2008		Yuhan Tan	Nathalie Descamps	Wouter Claes; Frederic Mawet	Severine Corvilain; Steffi Annys	Wouter Claes; Nathalie Descamps
2008/2009		Yuhan Tan	Nathalie Descamps	Wouter Claes; Frederic Mawet	Severine Corvilain; Steffi Annys	Wouter Claes; Nathalie Descamps
2009/2010	Tongeren	Yuhan Tan	Lianne Tan	Wouter Claes; Frederic Mawet	Janne Elst; Jelske Snoeck	Wouter Claes; Nathalie Descamps
2010/2011	Brussels	David Jaco	Lianne Tan	Matijs Dierickx; Freek Golinski	Steffi Annys; Severine Corvilain	Gert Poesen; Manon Albinus
2011/2012	Herentals	Yuhan Tan	Lianne Tan	Jonathan Gillis; Maxime Moreels	Nining Kustyaningsih; Lianne Tan	Frédéric Gaspard; Sabine Devooght
2012/2013	Verviers	Yuhan Tan	Lianne Tan	Matijs Dierickx; Freek Golinski	Janne Elst; Jelske Snoeck	Freek Golinski; Janne Elst
2013/2014	Dendermonde	Yuhan Tan	Lianne Tan	Matijs Dierickx; Freek Golinski	Janne Elst; Jelske Snoeck	Freek Golinski; Janne Elst
2014/2015	Herstal	Yuhan Tan	Lianne Tan	Matijs Dierickx; Freek Golinski	Steffi Annys; Flore Vandenhoucke	Nick Marcoen; Flore Vandenhoucke
2015/2016	Heist-op-den-Berg	Yuhan Tan	Lianne Tan	Matijs Dierickx; Freek Golinski	Lianne Tan; Flore Vandenhoucke	Matijs Dierickx; Steffi Annys
2017	Neufchâteau	Yuhan Tan	Lianne Tan	Matijs Dierickx; Freek Golinski	Lise Jaques; Flore Vandenhoucke	Elias Bracke; Lise Jaques
2018	Ronse	Maxime Moreels	Lianne Tan	Matijs Dierickx; Freek Golinski	Lise Jaques; Flore Vandenhoucke	Matijs Dierickx; Flore Vandenhoucke
2019	Anderlecht	Yuhan Tan	Lianne Tan	Elias Bracke; Freek Golinski	Lise Jaques; Flore Vandenhoucke	Patryk Szymoniak; Lise Jaques
2020	Houthalen-Helchteren	Marijn Put	Lianne Tan	Jordy van der Sypt; Tim van Herbruggen	Lise Jaques; Flore Vandenhoucke	Jona van Nieuwkerke; Lise Jaques
2021	Herstal	Julien Carraggi	Lianne Tan	Freek Golinski; Patryk Szymoniak	Lise Jaques; Flore Vandenhoucke	Jona van Nieuwkerke; Lise Jaques
2022	Kortrijk	Julien Carraggi	Lianne Tan	Freek Golinski; Patryk Szymoniak	Lise Jaques; Flore Vandenhoucke	Jona Van Nieuwkerke; Lise Jaques
2023	Gembloux	Elias Bracke	Clara Lassaux	Freek Golinski; Patryk Szymoniak	Lise Jaques; Lien Lammertyn	Senne Houthoofd; Lise Jaques
2024		Julien Carraggi	Clara Lassaux	Marijn Put; Dylan Rosius	Clara Lassaux; Flore Vandenhoucke	Freek Golinski; Tammi van Wonterghem
2025		Charles Fouyn	Clara Lassaux	Freek Golinski; Patryk Szymoniak	Clara Lassaux; Flore Vandenhoucke	Freek Golinski; Tammi van Wonterghem

== National Junior Champions ==
Year	Men's Singles	Women's Singles	Men's Doubles	Women's Doubles	Mixed Doubles
1987	Christian Reynders	Christine Jacobs	Christian Reynders; Peter van der Sijpt	Christine Jacobs; Nathalie Volochinoff	Sébastien Pepe; Christine Jacobs
1988	Hugues Belsack	Fabienne Rohgoot	Hugues Belsack; Laurent Koch	Anne Foblets; Anne Vandenheede	Jef Buckinckx; Heidi Vrancken
1989	Hugues Belsack	Heidi Vrancken	Jef Buckinckx; Jan Keymis	Anne Foblets; Heidi Vrancken	Hugues Belsack; Anne Foblets
1990	Philippe Gennaux	Heidi Vrancken	Stefaan de Rycke; Phillippe Gennaux	Heidi Vrancken; Van Dyck	Stephaan de Rycke; Van Dyck
1991	Stefaan de Rycke	Els Baert	Kurt Nys; Tom Raes	Els Baert; Peggy Mampaey	Thujen Pham; Sylvie Donnay
1992	Luigi Dalli Cardillo	Mirella Antico	Luigi Dalli Cardillo; Vandeninden	Els Baert; Sylvie Donnay	Luigi Dalli Cardillo; Mirella Antico
1993	Sven van Delsen	Sofie Merciny	Roel Bollen; Johan Delamper	Els Carrein; Caroline Persyn	Jan Daems; Els Carrein
1994	Wouter Claes	Caroline Persyn	Roel Boonen; Vandewinkel	Caroline Persyn; Mallory Gosset	Frédéric Mawet; Domken
1995	Frédéric Mawet	Caroline Persyn	Frédéric Mawet; Wandewinkel	Caroline Persyn; Smids	Frederic Mawet; Caroline Persyn
1996	Kristof van Landschoot	Mallory Gosset	Kristof van Landschoot; H. Willems	Katrien Claes; Ine De Clerck	Christophe Valette; Mallory Gosset
1997	Francois Delvaux	Mallory Gosset	Hans Willems van Heuckelom	Mallory Gosset; Maryse Deruyver	Gert Thone; Joke Thone
1998	Claude Libois	Katrien Claes	Benjamin Driesen; Stein Notermans	Katrien Claes; Joke Thone	Steven Delsaert; Katrien Claes
1999	Benoit Delvaux	Veerle Rakels	Tim Baeke; Steven Delsaert	Veerle Rakels; Valerie Descamps	Benjamin Driesen; Joke Thone
2000	Tim Baeke	Liesbeth Dufraing	Tim Baeke; Tim Wouters	Liesbeth Dufraing; An Soenens	Tim Baeke; An Soenens
2001	Tim Baeke	Liesbeth Dufraing	Toby Baldari; Andy Knaepen	Liesbeth Dufraing; An Soenens	Tim Baeke; An Soenens
2002	Steven Knaepen	Elke Biesbrouck	Jérôme Legrand; Lionel Warnotte	Elke Biesbrouck; Evy Descamps	Grégory Vanvlaenderen; Nathalie Descamps
2003	Lionel Warnotte	Evy Descamps	Steven Knaepen; Pieter Mertens	Evy Descamps; Annelie Tan	Lionel Warnotte; Laurence Charneux
2004	Gilles Laguesse	Sophie Laguesse	Geofrey Lamont; Karel Sioncke	Sabine Devooght; Maite Lamont	Koen Verleyen; Kelly Scoliers
2005	Yuhan Tan	Laurence Charneux	Jente Paesen; Yuhan Tan	Steffie Annys; Stefanie Bertels	Jonathan Gillis; Laurence Charneux
2006	Yuhan Tan	Stefanie Bertels	Jente Paesen; Yuhan Tan	Steffie Annys; Stefanie Bertels	Jonathan Gillis; Laurence Charneux
2007	Damien Maquet	Lianne Tan	Laurent Cuccu; Nicolas Cuccu	Jelske Snoeck; Janne Elst	Damien Maquet; Severine Corvilain
2008	Damien Maquet	Lianne Tan	Valentijn Beckers; Arno Vandenhoucke	Steffie Daemen; Debbie Janssens	Damien Maquet; Debbie Janssens
2009	Matijs Dierickx	Jelske Snoeck	Freek Golinski; Matijs Dierickx	Jelske Snoeck; Debbie Janssens	Freek Golinski; Silke Barrez
2010	Freek Golinski	Roxane Hens	Freek Golinski; Matijs Dierickx	Nele Hayen; Liesse Vandersmissen	Birger Abts; Jana Tegethoff
2011	Nathan Vervaeke	Angela Castillo	Thomas Arnalsteen; Floris Oleffe	Angela Castillo; Marie Demy	Amauray Lejoint; Justine Godfroid
2012	Marijn Put	Stéphanie van Wel	Marijn Put; Floris Oleffe	Marine Lemaire; Stéphanie van Wel	Simon Eeckhoudt; Marine Lemaire
2013	Marijn Put	Flore Vandenhoucke	Nick Marcoen; Sam van den Broeck	Ine Lancriet; Flore Vandenhoucke	Nick Marcoen; Stéphanie van Wel
2014	Stijn de Langhe	Présence Beelen	Stijn de Langhe; Flor Spanhove	Présence Beelen; Clara Lassaux	Rowan Scheurkogel; Ann Knaepen
2015	Daan Philips	Présence Beelen	Rover Jay Babatido; Lauwrence de Pauw	Présence Beelen; Ann Knaepen	Rowan Scheurkogel; Ann Knaepen
2016	Julien Carraggi	Clara Lassaux	Guillaume Bonnet; Alexandre Lallemand	Joke de Langhe; Lise Jaques	Elias Bracké; Lise Jaques
2017	Julien Carraggi	Clara Lassaux	Guillaume Bonnet; Alexandre Lallemand	Joke de Langhe; Lise Jaques	Elias Bracké; Lise Jaques
2018	Gertjan Devaere	Clara Lassaux	Quentin Bouchez; Gertjan Devaere	Joke de Langhe; Steffi van de Vel	Gertjan Devaere; Sofie van de Kerkhof
2019	Robby Bronselaer	Clara Lassaux	Robby Bronselaer; Michiel van Britsom	Clara Lassaux; Kirstin Boonen	Senne Houthoofd; Steffi van de Vel
2020	Adrien Slegers	No competition	Alexis Gius; Adrien Slegers	Kaat van Wouwe; Ine van Wouwe	Remi Leman; Ine van Wouwe
2021	No competition				
2022	Charles Fouyn	Lien Lammertyn	Iljo van Delsen; Yaro van Delsen	Lotte Geerts; Mare van Britsom	Charles Fouyn; Amber Boonen
2023	Baptiste Rolin	Karla Henry	Wolf Hoebeke; Jonah Quintens	Amber Boonen; Tammi van Wonterghem	Baptiste Rolin; Karla Henry
2024	Baptiste Rolin	Amber Boonen	Brent Stockman; Jonah Quintens	Amber Boonen; Tammi van Wonterghem	Jonah Quintens; Amber Boonen
