= 2019 BWF World Senior Championships – 45+ =

Tournament details
- Dates: 4 August 2019 – 11 August 2019
- Edition: 9
- Level: International
- Competitors: 280 from 36 nations
- Venue: Spodek
- Location: Katowice, Poland

Champions
- Men's singles: (Chinese Taipei) Liao Lien-sheng
- Women's singles: (Netherlands) Georgy van Soerland-Trouerbach
- Men's doubles: (Sweden) Mikael Nilsson (Sweden) Ulf Svensson
- Women's doubles: (Netherlands) Marielle van der Woerdt (Netherlands) Georgy van Soerland-Trouerbach
- Mixed doubles: (Russia) Vadim Nazarov (Russia) Olga Kuznetsova

These are the results of 2019 BWF World Senior Championships' 45+ events.

== Men's singles ==
=== Seeds ===
1. Carsten Loesch (quarter-finals)
2. Fernando Silva (bronze medalist)
3. Ulf Svensson (fourth round)
4. Jaison Xavier (third round)
5. Carl Jennings (quarter-finals)
6. Christophie Lionne (bronze medalist)
7. Stephan Burmeister (fourth round)
8. Kiran Vinayakrao Makode (fourth round)
9. Junichiro Nagai (third round)
10. Terje Jacobsen (third round)
11. Stan de Lange (second round)
12. Liao Lien-sheng (gold medalist)
13. Morten Aarup (fourth round)
14. Stefan Edvardsson (quarter-finals)
15. Mikael Nilsson (fourth round)
16. Henrik Wahlstrøm Hansen (second round)

=== Finals ===
Quarter-finals
1	Carsten Loesch	17	12
12	Liao Lien-sheng	21	21
Johnny Hast Hansen	17	20
6	Christophe Lionne	21	22
14	Stefan Edvardsson	16	13
Dariusz Zięba	21	21
5	Carl Jennings	12	13
2	Fernando Silva	21	21

Semi-finals
12	Liao Lien-sheng	21	13	21
6	Christophe Lionne	14	21	10
Dariusz Zięba	25	21
2	Fernando Silva	23	12

Final
12	Liao Lien-sheng	21	20	21
Dariusz Zięba	19	22	17

=== Top half ===
==== Section 1 ====
First round
P Domeniconi	13	10
L A Morcillo	21	21
A Hoop	21	21
K Zakis	19	18

Second round
1	C Loesch	21	21
Jayaweera M	9	8
E Yarovyi	5	5
L A Morcillo	21	21
15	M Nilsson	21	21
B Mørken	12	11
J Bacskai	21	21
A Hoop	16	8

Third round
1	C Loesch	21	21
L A Morcillo	6	11
15	M Nilsson	21	21
J Bacskai	3	8

Fourth round
1	C Loesch	21	21
15	M Nilsson	8	11

==== Section 2 ====
First round
V Garmus	3	10
K Walenda	21	21
K Hamaji	21	21
M Pluvinage	12	19
H Kleinert	10	19
P J. Sunderland	21	21

Second round
8	K V Makode	21	21
P Shorin	12	16
D Nelson	16	16
K Walenda	21	21
12	Liao L-s	21	21
J Miininen	5	7
K Hamaji	21	21
P J. Sunderland	19	8

Third round
8	K V Makode	18	21	21
K Walenda	21	13	17
12	Liao L-s	21	21
K Hamaji	13	17

Fourth round
8	K V Makode	13	13
12	Liao L-s	21	21

==== Section 3 ====
First round
F Herrero	14	7
P Thiele	21	21
T Kajava	21	21
E Zanin	10	12
J Hast Hansen	21	21
G Blyth	12	17

Second round
3	U Svensson	21	21
M Kuddus	6	7
N Schneider	18	10
P Thiele	21	21
9	J Nagai	21	21
G Fischer	11	19
T Kajava	10	14
J Hast Hansen	21	21

Third round
3	U Svensson	21	21
P Thiele	7	14
9	J Nagai	9	18
J Hast Hansen	21	21

Fourth round
3	U Svensson	22	18
J Hast Hansen	24	21

==== Section 4 ====
First round
K Grabek	21	16	21
V Næss	18	21	10
J Port	22	25	16
T Talts	20	27	21
A K Srivastava	21	21
M Stan	14	17

Second round
6	C Lionne	21	21
A Mokotar	10	11
S Ivan	23	11	11
K Grabek	21	21	21
11	S de Lange	4	21	13
S Gilhooly	21	18	21
T Talts	6	9
A K Srivastava	21	21

Third round
6	C Lionne	21	21
K Grabek	9	11
S Gilhooly	21	21
A K Srivastava	13	14

Fourth round
6	C Lionne	21	21
S Gilhooly	13	19

=== Bottom half ===
==== Section 5 ====
First round
V Vlk	21	15	20
M Emran	16	21	22
D Brown	21	21
R Jakobsen	14	13
A Zanders	12	11
J Uusna	21	21

Second round
M Emran	11	12
D Brown	21	21
L Calamel	21	10	6
14	S Edvardsson	19	21	21
J Uusna	15	10
V Oliinyk	21	21
D Günter	3	6
7	S Burmeister	21	21

Third round
D Brown	13	6
14	S Edvardsson	21	21
V Oliinyk	17	13
7	S Burmeister	21	21

Fourth round
14	S Edvardsson	18	21	22
7	S Burmeister	21	14	20

==== Section 6 ====
First round
S Attanyake	10	6
X R Thekkiniath	21	21
V Tarasov	21	21
R Jareño	15	8
O Milec	7	8
D Zięba	21	21

Second round
X R Thekkiniath	21	21
V Tarasov	13	3
J Hayashi	21	21
16	H W Hansen	12	12
D Zięba	21	21
M Sheach	8	2
C A Di Marco	12	3
4	J Xavier	21	21

Third round
X R Thekkiniath	21	12	21
J Hayashi	12	21	19
D Zięba	24	21
4	J Xavier	22	15

Fourth round
X R Thekkiniath	7	7
D Zięba	21	21

==== Section 7 ====
First round
S Stravinskas	11	21	21
P Socha	21	19	16
A Dadas	21	21
Kim Y-j	9	15
H Perdana	9	21
V Torbilo	21	23

Second round
S Stravinskas	19	17
A Dadas	21	21
A U P J Samarakoon Miriyagodage	14	13
13	M Aarup	21	21
V Torbilo	21	21
M Sokol	14	15
A K Sharma	15	21	18
5	C Jennings	21	18	21

Third round
A Dadas	19	10
13	M Aarup	21	21
V Torbilo	15	19
5	C Jennings	21	21

Fourth round
13	M Aarup	23	15	15
5	C Jennings	21	21	21

==== Section 8 ====
First round
R Hechenberger	21	21
I Yurov	12	14
U Briedis	21	21
T Lehtosaari	7	12
A Rangil	18	24
K Arita	21	26

Second round
R Hechenberger	9	21	21
U Briedis	21	15	15
O von Kempen	22	17	20
10	T Jacobsen	20	21	22
K Arita	21	21
J Renaudeau	15	18
J Häggman	10	13
2	F Silva	21	21

Third round
R Hechenberger	24	14	21
10	T Jacobsen	22	21	12
K Arita	17	9
2	F Silva	21	21

Fourth round
R Hechenberger	14	11
2	F Silva	21	21

== Women's singles ==
=== Seeds ===
1. Gondáné Fórián Csilla (bronze medalist)
2. Georgy van Soerland-Trouerbach (gold medalist)
3. Mirella Engelhardt (third round)
4. Marika Wippich (third round)
5. Anke Treu (second round)
6. Barbara Kulanty (quarter-finals)
7. Pernille Strøm (quarter-finals)
8. Birgitte Pedersen (third round)

=== Finals ===
Semi-finals
1	Gondáné Fórián Csilla	14	16
Shü Yuh-ling	21	21
Nami Fukui	21	13	12
2	Georgy van Soerland-Trouerbach	17	21	21

Final
Shü Yuh-ling	17	13
2	Georgy van Soerland-Trouerbach	21	21

=== Top half ===
==== Section 1 ====
First round
M Meyer	16	21	21
M Vasconcelos	21	13	13
A Svensson	21	17	21
K Thomt	12	21	16
K Kimura	17	13
M van der Woerdt	21	21

Second round
1	Gondáné Fórián C	21	21
E Młynarska	7	15
M Alajõe	16	13
M Meyer	21	21
8	B Pedersen	21	21
A Svensson	17	12
R Mahadevia	10	16
M van der Woerdt	21	21

Third round
1	Gondáné Fórián C	21	21
M Meyer	11	11
8	B Pedersen	15	10
M van der Woerdt	21	21

Quarter-finals
1	Gondáné Fórián C	21	21
M van der Woerdt	16	13

==== Section 2 ====
First round
Shü Y-l	21	21
C Rindshøj	11	9
W Taylor	21	6	21
M Taniguchi	16	21	18
D Harfmann Bromée	18	21	15
S Thomas	21	12	21

Second round
3	M Engelhardt	w	/	o
R Hassan
Z Gomes	6	6
Shü Y-l	21	21
6	B Kulanty	21	21
W Taylor	12	8
F Striebel	21	19	21
S Thomas	12	21	17

Third round
3	M Engelhardt	19	21	8
Shü Y-l	21	18	21
6	B Kulanty	21	21
F Striebel	11	12

Quarter-finals
Shü Y-l	21	21
6	B Kulanty	7	15

=== Bottom half ===
==== Section 3 ====
First round
M Gomes	21	21
D Craig	14	18
S Le Pimpec	21	21
M Jonsson	6	13
N Fukui	21	21
O Yurchenko	12	9

Second round
M Gomes	21	13	21
D Korbel	16	21	17
S Le Pimpec	21	13	14
7	P Strøm	18	21	21
N Fukui	21	21
H Torbilo	3	3
P Vanlaer	15	13
4	M Wippich	21	21

Third round
M Gomes	9	8
7	P Strøm	21	21
N Fukui	21	21
4	M Wippich	12	14

Quarter-finals
7	P Strøm	8	9
N Fukui	21	21

==== Section 4 ====
First round
A-C Ryrman	13	21
A Ueda	21	23
M Brothers	10	7
M Asmussen	21	21
A Grohmann	21	21
N Divecha	14	15

Second round
A Ueda	21	21
B Tanthammaroj	13	19
M Asmussen	21	21
5	A Treu	14	15
A Grohmann	21	21
B Wołkowycka	12	7
H Bretillon	8	7
2	G van Soerland-Trouerbach	21	21

Third round
A Ueda	21	17	21
M Asmussen	16	21	18
A Grohmann	8	19
2	G van Soerland-Trouerbach	21	21

Quarter-finals
A Ueda	17	11
2	G van Soerland-Trouerbach	21	21

== Men's doubles ==
=== Seeds ===
1. Wittaya Panomchai / Pracha Wannawichitr (bronze medalists)
2. Jaseel P. Ismail / Jaison Xavier (bronze medalists)
3. Morten Aarup / Carsten Loesch (silver medalists)
4. Mikael Nilsson / Ulf Svensson (gold medalists)
5. Oleg Grigoryev / Vadim Nazarov (quarter-finals)
6. Carl Jennings / Mark King (quarter-finals)
7. Stefan Edvardsson / Johan Häggman (quarter-finals)
8. Surender Kumar / Virender Kumar (third round)
9. Junichiro Nagai / Shigeyuki Nakamura (third round)
10. Lakshman Homer / Ajith Upendra Perera Jaya Samarakoon Miriyagodage (third round)
11. Cheng Ho-chan / Liao Lien-sheng (third round)
12. Stephan Burmeister / André Wiechmann (first round)
13. Thaweesak Koetsriphan / Naruthum Surakkhaka (third round)
14. Justin G. Andrews / Simon Gilhooly (third round)
15. Henrik Wahlstrøm Hansen / Eril Pedersen (third round)
16. Joël Renaudeau / Cyrille Vu (first round)

=== Finals ===
Semi-finals
1	Wittaya Panomchai; Pracha Wannawichitr	13	21	21
4	Mikael Nilsson; Ulf Svensson	21	16	23
3	Morten Aarup; Carsten Loesch	24	21
2	Jaseel P. Ismail; Jaison Xavier	22	18

Final
4	Mikael Nilsson; Ulf Svensson	17	21	21
3	Morten Aarup; Carsten Loesch	21	19	15

=== Top half ===
==== Section 1 ====
First round
1	W Panomchai; P Wannawichitr	21	21
D Nelson; L Nesbitt	6	6
M Galczynski; T Stopa	19	21	13
A Antipov; A Vasiliev	21	14	21
14	J G. Andrews; S Gilhooly	21	21
O Henningsson; S Thorsen	19	16
O Milec; I Novak	16	15
M Hopp; O von Kempen	21	21
8	S Kumar; V Kumar	21	21
T Kajava; J Rafols	13	11
K Arita; J Hayashi	21	21
A Kepežinskas; S Stravinskas	3	14
10	L Homer; A U P J Samarakoon Miriyagodage	21	21
SUB	B Banhsen; V Oliinyk	9	11
G Blyth; M Sheach	17	16
A Latour; F Lechalupe	21	21

Second round
1	W Panomchai; P Wannawichitr	21	21
A Antipov; A Vasiliev	8	7
14	J G. Andrews; S Gilhooly	21	21
M Hopp; O von Kempen	14	17
8	S Kumar; V Kumar	10	10
K Arita; J Hayashi	21	21
10	L Homer; A U P J Samarakoon Miriyagodage	21	21
A Latour; F Lechalupe	14	5

Third round
1	W Panomchai; P Wannawichitr	21	21
14	J G. Andrews; S Gilhooly	15	13
K Arita; J Hayashi	21	21
10	L Homer; A U P J Samarakoon Miriyagodage	13	15

Quarter-finals
1	W Panomchai; P Wannawichitr	21	16	21
K Arita; J Hayashi	19	21	15

==== Section 2 ====
First round
4	M Nilsson; U Svensson	21	21
C Hufflett; R Irvine	12	10
S de Lange; A Steenkjær	17	21	20
K V Makode; A A Pednekar	21	18	22
12	S Burmeister; A Wiechmann	21	18	19
K Hamaji; S Ogawa	17	21	21
M Arnet; P Kurz
T Helander; V Næss	w	/	o
5	O Grigoryev; V Nazarov	21	21
L A Morcillo; A Rangil	13	14
P Halsch; J Port	21	21
F Bagnard; C Barrientos	13	15
15	H W Hansen; E Pedersen	19	22	21
D Zięba; Z Zięba	21	20	11
P Salmi; I Salonen	10	15
P Ponnengattil; S Poyyathara Balan	21	21

Second round
4	M Nilsson; U Svensson	21	21
K V Makode; A A Pednekar	12	18
K Hamaji; S Ogawa	21	21
T Helander; V Næss	16	15
5	O Grigoryev; V Nazarov	21	21
P Halsch; J Port	10	10
15	H W Hansen; E Pedersen	21	21
P Ponnengattil; S Poyyathara Balan	19	13

Third round
4	M Nilsson; U Svensson	24	21
K Hamaji; S Ogawa	22	19
5	O Grigoryev; V Nazarov	21	21
15	H W Hansen; E Pedersen	10	14

Quarter-finals
4	M Nilsson; U Svensson	21	21
5	O Grigoryev; V Nazarov	19	13

=== Bottom half ===
==== Section 3 ====
First round
A Dadas; G Radecki	12	18
H Kleinert; P Thiele	21	21
F Herrero; J C Padilla	8	12
9	J Nagai; S Nakamura	21	21
L Calamel; M Pluvinage	21	21
E Cizinauskas; V Garmus	19	13
R S Rajasekharan; S Ray	12	11
7	S Edvardsson; J Häggman	21	21
D Brown; D Green	21	21
R Hechenberger; E Tomes	17	18
S Ivan; M Laznik	6	12
11	Cheng H-c; Liao L-s	21	21
S Shrestha; R Thing
E Lentochink; I Yurov	w	/	o
S Keparambath; S Retnalayam Subramanian Pullai	14	17
3	M Aarup; C Loesch	21	21

Second round
H Kleinert; P Thiele	14	14
9	J Nagai; S Nakamura	21	21
L Calamel; M Pluvinage	15	10
7	S Edvardsson; J Häggman	21	21
D Brown; D Green	9	12
11	Cheng H-c; Liao L-s	21	21
E Lentochink; I Yurov	6	11
3	M Aarup; C Loesch	21	21

Third round
9	J Nagai; S Nakamura	21	17	15
7	S Edvardsson; J Häggman	15	21	21
11	Cheng H-c; Liao L-s	8	13
3	M Aarup; C Loesch	21	21

Quarter-finals
7	S Edvardsson; J Häggman	9	15
3	M Aarup; C Loesch	21	21

==== Section 4 ====
First round
M Kuddus; P Shorin	18	23	21
N Schneider; V Torbilo	21	21	11
C Berger; T Reinemann	21	18	21
16	J Renaudeau; C Vu	12	21	8
S Mohammed Kasim; X R Thekkiniath	21	21
P Domeniconi; D Günter	9	9
R Jakobsen; B Mørken	16	11
6	C Jennings; M King	21	21
J Konupka; V Vlk	12	15
M Pieklo; A Tukendorf	21	21
P Salhoja; A Tolonen	8	7
13	T Koetsriphan; N Surakkhaka	21	21
M Blom; J Karlsson	21	21
M Eriksson; T Jacobsen	14	7
B Kasela; S Kurimai	6	11
2	J P. Ismail; J Xavier	21	21

Second round
M Kuddus; P Shorin	4	13
C Berger; T Reinemann	21	21
S Mohammed Kasim; X R Thekkiniath	24	16
6	C Jennings; M King	26	21
M Pieklo; A Tukendorf	15	12
13	T Koetsriphan; N Surakkhaka	21	21
M Blom; J Karlsson	11	14
2	J P. Ismail; J Xavier	21	21

Third round
C Berger; T Reinemann	12	11
6	C Jennings; M King	21	21
13	T Koetsriphan; N Surakkhaka	17	15
2	J P. Ismail; J Xavier	21	21

Quarter-finals
6	C Jennings; M King	9	11
2	J P. Ismail; J Xavier	21	21

== Women's doubles ==
=== Seeds ===
1. Natalia Gonchar / Olga Kuznetsova (silver medalists)
2. Christina Rindshøj / Dorte Steenberg (bronze medalists)
3. Louise Culyer / Tracy Hutchinson (quarter-finals)
4. Dorota Grzejdak / Barbara Kulanty (second round)
5. Marielle van der Woerdt / Georgy van Soerland-Trouerbach (gold medalists)
6. Mirella Engelhardt / Marika Wippich (second round)
7. Debbie Beeston-Smith / Olga Bryant (second round)
8. Janne Vang Nielsen / Birgitte Pedersen (quarter-finals)

=== Finals ===
Semi-finals
1	Natalia Gonchar; Olga Kuznetsova	21	21
Majken Asmussen; Lynne Campbell	18	12
5	Marielle van der Woerdt; Georgy van Soerland-Trouerbach	21	21
2	Christina Rindshøj; Dorte Steenberg	13	15

Final
1	Natalia Gonchar; Olga Kuznetsova	21	8	18
5	Marielle van der Woerdt; Georgy van Soerland-Trouerbach	12	21	21

=== Top half ===
==== Section 1 ====
First round
N Divecha; W Patil	13	11
A Dietz; E Vonmetz	21	21
V Crochet Sire; B Fosse	18	18
M Jonsson; A Lindgren	21	21

Second round
1	N Gonchar; O Kuznetsova	21	21
P Kaosamaang; B Tanthammaroj	8	12
Yang S-a; Yu G-s	9	11
A Dietz; E Vonmetz	21	21
8	J V Nielsen; B Pedersen	21	21
B Jaskólska; D Korbel	13	5
T Dove; C Jowett	21	12	21
M Jonsson; A Lindgren	18	21	18

Third round
1	N Gonchar; O Kuznetsova	21	21
A Dietz; E Vonmetz	10	16
8	J V Nielsen; B Pedersen	21	21
T Dove; C Jowett	9	7

Quarter-finals
1	N Gonchar; O Kuznetsova	21	21
8	J V Nielsen; B Pedersen	16	12

==== Section 2 ====
First round
I Ermiča; K Martinsone	21	21
A Lemmens; P Vanlaer	10	16
T Caldeström; M Kårström	21	15	21
T Tombak; M Velga	16	21	14
D N Joshi; C Navare	21	18	7
M Asmussen; L Campbell	14	21	21

Second round
4	D Grzejdak; B Kulanty	20	19
T Eberl; M Hukriede	22	21
H Bretillon; S Thomas	13	14
I Ermiča; K Martinsone	21	21
7	D Beeston-Smith; O Bryant	13	21	21
T Caldeström; M Kårström	21	14	23
H Torbilo; M Vasconcelos	6	2
M Asmussen; L Campbell	21	21

Third round
T Eberl; M Hukriede	21	21
I Ermiča; K Martinsone	15	14
T Caldeström; M Kårström	13	18
M Asmussen; L Campbell	21	21

Quarter-finals
T Eberl; M Hukriede	18	22
M Asmussen; L Campbell	21	24

=== Bottom half ===
==== Section 3 ====
First round
P Finger; M Meyer	21	21
K Dhanwani; R Garg	9	3
A Białasiewicz; E Młynarska	10	13
M Hanyu; A Ueda	21	21
T Gulbrandsen; H Parnemann	21	21
M Elizabeth Moban; S D P Widanalge	5	17

Second round
P Finger; M Meyer	22	21
M Alajõe; A Kanter	20	12
M Hanyu; A Ueda	12	19
5	M van der Woerdt; G van Soerland-Trouerbach	21	21
T Gulbrandsen; H Parnemann	15	9
M Gomes; Z Gomes	21	21
C Pian; N Prévot	2	2
3	L Culyer; T Hutchinson	21	21

Third round
P Finger; M Meyer	9	14
5	M van der Woerdt; G van Soerland-Trouerbach	21	21
M Gomes; Z Gomes	9	5
3	L Culyer; T Hutchinson	21	21

Quarter-finals
5	M van der Woerdt; G van Soerland-Trouerbach	21	21
3	L Culyer; T Hutchinson	13	18

==== Section 4 ====
First round
Chang J-p; Chiu F-l	21	21
S Le Pimpec; M-N Lechalupe	15	10
D Craig; A Svensson	21	17	21
L Nilsson; A-C Ryrman	16	21	16

Second round
Chang J-p; Chiu F-l	21	15	10
F Striebel; A Treu	15	21	21
M Brothers; W Taylor	18	21	21
6	M Engelhardt; M Wippich	21	17	12
D Craig; A Svensson	w	/	o
Gondáné Fórián C R Hassan
A Mynarska; B Szczecina	7	3
2	C Rindshøj; D Steenberg	21	21

Third round
F Striebel; A Treu	21	21
M Brothers; W Taylor	17	15
D Craig; A Svensson	11	7
2	C Rindshøj; D Steenberg	21	21

Quarter-finals
F Striebel; A Treu	9	9
2	C Rindshøj; D Steenberg	21	21

== Mixed doubles ==
=== Seeds ===
1. Carsten Loesch / Dorte Steenberg (bronze medalists)
2. Morten Aarup / Lene Struwe Andersen (silver medalists)
3. Stan de Lange / Georgy van Soerland-Trouerbach (third round)
4. Vadim Nazarov / Olga Kuznetsova (gold medalists)
5. Thaweesak Koetsriphan / Angela Charumilinda (quarter-finals)
6. Justin G. Andrews / Betty Blair (second round)
7. Naruthum Surakkhaka / Puangthip Kaosamaang (quarter-finals)
8. Henrik Wahlstrøm Hansen / Malene Wahlstrøm Hansen (second round)

=== Finals ===
Semi-finals
1	Carsten Loesch; Dorte Steenberg	17	22
4	Vadim Nazarov; Olga Kuznetsova	21	24
Fernando Silva; Maria Gomes	21	20	19
2	Morten Aarup; Lene Struwe Andersen	15	22	21

Final
4	Vadim Nazarov; Olga Kuznetsova	21	21
2	Morten Aarup; Lene Struwe Andersen	17	11

=== Top half ===
==== Section 1 ====
First round
P Kurz; A Treu	21	21
J Szałapski; A Białasiewicz	16	10
R Jakobsen; T Gulbrandsen	11	8
T Kuhn; D Beeston-Smith	21	21
J Häggman; T Caldeström	21	21
T Reinemann; T Gayk	18	14
A Zanders; I Ermiča	8	7
S Nakamura; R Sato	21	21
S Keparambath; M Elizabeth Moban	21	21
M V R Meka; R Bokkisam	16	19
V Torbilo; H Torbilo	10	13
C Lionne; S Le Pimpec	21	21

Second round
1	C Loesch; D Steenberg	21	21
P Kurz; A Treu	19	6
T Kuhn; D Beeston-Smith	21	21
J Häggman; T Caldeström	16	13
5	T Koetsriphan; A Charumilinda	21	21
S Nakamura; R Sato	16	17
S Keparambath; M Elizabeth Moban	25	15
C Lionne; S Le Pimpec	27	21

Third round
1	C Loesch; D Steenberg	21	21
T Kuhn; D Beeston-Smith	19	6
5	T Koetsriphan; A Charumilinda	21	21
C Lionne; S Le Pimpec	17	11

Quarter-finals
1	C Loesch; D Steenberg	21	21
5	T Koetsriphan; A Charumilinda	10	12

==== Section 2 ====
First round
D Nahrebecki; S Swoboda	12	17
S Grahn; A-C Ryrman	21	21
K Hamaji; M Hanyu	21	21
M Hopp; A Dietz	17	11
C Vu; C Pian	21	21
S Saban; P Vanlaer	19	13
A A Pednekar; N Divecha	21	21
D Nelson; M Vasconcelos	19	9
A Steenkjær; B Pedersen	21	21
T Helander; K Thomt	11	9
K Walenda; M Koba	21	21
A Hoop; A Kanter	11	9

Second round
4	V Nazarov; O Kuznetsova	24	21
S Grahn; A-C Ryrman	22	16
K Hamaji; M Hanyu	21	21
C Vu; C Pian	13	13
6	J G. Andrews; B Blair	14	18
A A Pednekar; N Divecha	21	21
A Steenkjær; B Pedersen	21	21
K Walenda; M Koba	16	17

Third round
4	V Nazarov; O Kuznetsova	21	23
K Hamaji; M Hanyu	12	21
A A Pednekar; N Divecha	21	23	11
A Steenkjær; B Pedersen	17	25	21

Quarter-finals
4	V Nazarov; O Kuznetsova	21	21
A Steenkjær; B Pedersen	16	7

=== Bottom half ===
==== Section 3 ====
First round
F Herrero; E Barbera	14	8
U Briedis; K Martinsone	21	21
P Chrzęszczyk; B Jaskólska	7	11
M Nilsson; D Harfman Bromée	21	21
J Nagai; K Kushiyama	11	19
S Gilhooly; D Miller	21	21
F Bagnard; V Crochet Sire	17	16
8	H W Hansen; M W Hansen	21	21
F Silva; M Gomes	w	/	o
S Shrestha; A Shrestha
R Hechenberger; F Striebel	21	21
D Delgado; C Delgado	7	12
A Wiechmann; E Vonmetz	21	21
Ch S R K Srinivasan	12	10

Second round
U Briedis; K Martinsone	21	17	19
M Nilsson; D Harfman Bromée	19	21	21
S Gilhooly; D Miller	21	21
8	H W Hansen; M W Hansen	14	17
F Silva; M Gomes	21	21
R Hechenberger; F Striebel	10	7
A Wiechmann; E Vonmetz	18	13
3	S de Lange; G van Soerland-Trouerbach	21	21

Third round
M Nilsson; D Harfman Bromée	21	18	22
S Gilhooly; D Miller	18	21	20
F Silva; M Gomes	21	21
3	S de Lange; G van Soerland-Trouerbach	15	7

Quarter-finals
M Nilsson; D Harfman Bromée	18	13
F Silva; M Gomes	21	21

==== Section 4 ====
First round
S M Raghav; S Rajesh Shetty	12	17
D Green; O Bryant	21	21
A Antipov; N Gonchar	21	15	21
B Mørken; H Parnemann	17	21	13
Park C-h; Yang S-a	4	7
J Renaudeau; H Bretillon	21	21
K Arita; K Kimura	23	21
S Thorsen; A Lindgren	21	14
M Pieklo; B Kulanty	21	21
M Tammik; M Alajõe	10	12
T Jacobsen; D Craig	21	11	14
M Buchfeld; H Scheier	11	21	21

Second round
D Green; O Bryant	11	21	21
A Antipov; N Gonchar	21	17	8
J Renaudeau; H Bretillon	17	21
7	N Surakkhaka; P Kaosamaang	21	23
K Arita; K Kimura	16	16
M Pieklo; B Kulanty	21	21
M Buchfeld; H Scheier	11	17
4	M Aarup; L S Andersen	21	21

Third round
D Green; O Bryant	12	13
7	N Surakkhaka; P Kaosamaang	21	21
M Pieklo; B Kulanty	16	18
2	M Aarup; L S Andersen	21	21

Quarter-finals
7	N Surakkhaka; P Kaosamaang	18	20
2	M Aarup; L S Andersen	21	22
