= Jochen Cassel =

German badminton player (born 1981)

Personal information
- Born: 9 August 1981 (age 45)
- Height: 1.78 m (5 ft 10 in)

Sport
- Country: Germany
- Sport: Badminton
- Handedness: Right
- Event: Doubles

Doubles
- BWF profile
Medal record
Men's badminton
Representing Germany
European Junior Championships
Gold medal – first place	1999 Glasgow	Mixed team

Jochen Cassel (born 9 August 1981) is a German retired badminton player affiliated with BC Bischmisheim club.

Cassel was once the best German player in his years, he and Björn Joppien were U-19 German champions in 1998 in the boys' doubles. His notable achievements were title wins in Iceland, Ireland and Mauritius, Israel and Bahrain together with his partner Thomas Tesche. He became the National Champion twice in 2007 and 2008. He completed his studies from University of Saarbrücken in Germany and currently works as a managing director of 'Joyn', a streaming service providing company.

== Achievements ==
=== IBF/BWF International ===
Men's doubles
Year	Tournament	Partner	Opponent	Score	Result
2001	Iceland International	(Germany) Ingo Kindervater	(Iceland) Helgi Jóhannesson (Iceland) Njörður Ludvigsson	0–7, 8–6, 7–4, 7–1	(gold) Winner
2003	Giraldilla International	(Germany) Joachim Tesche	(Belgium) Wouter Claes (Belgium) Frédéric Mawet	7–15, 17–14, 13–15	(silver) Runner-up
2003	South Africa International	(Germany) Joachim Tesche	(Germany) Kristof Hopp (Germany) Thomas Tesche	8–15, 12–15	(silver) Runner-up
2003	Australian International	(Germany) Joachim Tesche	(Hong Kong) Albertus Susanto Njoto (Hong Kong) Liu Kwok Wa	4–15, 9–15	(silver) Runner-up
2006	Irish International	(Germany) Thomas Tesche	(Denmark) Kasper Hendriksen (Denmark) Rasmus Bonde	21–16, 21–19	(gold) Winner
2007	Mauritius International	(Germany) Thomas Tesche	(South Africa) Chris Dednam (South Africa) Roelof Dednam	21–13, 21–14	(gold) Winner
2007	Bahrain Satellite	(Germany) Thomas Tesche	(Malaysia) Azahar Azrihanif (Malaysia) Goh Ying Jin	21–15, 21–18	(gold) Winner
2007	Croatian International	(Germany) Thomas Tesche	(Belgium) Wouter Claes (Belgium) Frédéric Mawet	21–11, 20–22, 19–21	(silver) Runner-up
2007	Hatzor International	(Germany) Thomas Tesche	(Bulgaria) Stiliyan Makarski (Bulgaria) Vladimir Metodiev	21–19, 21–13	(gold) Winner
2007	White Nights	(Germany) Thomas Tesche	(Russia) Vitalij Durkin (Russia) Alexander Nikolaenko	17–21, 15–21	(silver) Runner-up
2007	Canadian Open	(Germany) Thomas Tesche	(Canada) William Milroy (Canada) Mike Beres	17–21, 14–21	(silver) Runner-up

Mixed doubles
Year	Tournament	Partner	Opponent	Score	Result
2004	Scottish International	(Germany) Birgit Overzier	(Sweden) Fredrik Bergström (Sweden) Johanna Persson	3–15, 13–15	(silver) Runner-up
2005	Finnish International	(Germany) Birgit Overzier	(Poland) Robert Mateusiak (Poland) Nadieżda Kostiuczyk	4–15, 5–15	(silver) Runner-up
