= Ana Moura (badminton) =

Portuguese badminton player

Personal information
- Born: Ana Luisa Flôr Moura; 21 January 1986 (age 40) Funchal, Madeira, Portugal
- Height: 1.69 m (5 ft 7 in)
- Weight: 58 kg (128 lb)

Sport
- Country: Portugal
- Sport: Badminton
- Coached by: Ricardo Fernandes
- Event: Women's singles

Women's singles
- BWF profile

Ana Luisa Flôr Moura (born 21 January 1986) is a Portuguese badminton player from the Club Sports Madeira. Moura was the National Junior champion in the girls' singles and doubles event in 2004, and also in the girls' singles, doubles and mixed doubles event in 2005. At the National senior championships, she won once in the women's singles, three times in the women's doubles and two times in the mixed doubles event. In 2007, Moura won the singles title at the Iran and Algeria International tournaments, and in the doubles event at the Ecuador and Mauritius International tournaments. In the same year, she competed at the 2007 BWF World Championships in the women's singles, and was defeated in the second round by Xie Xingfang, of China, 21–2, 21–7. Moura also qualified to compete at the Beijing 2008 Summer Olympics, but she was defeated by Jeanine Cicognini of Switzerland in the first round with the score 21–9, 21–13. Ana Moura is back on court. At the season 2018/2019 she is playing at Secção de Badminton - Associação Académica de Coimbra.

== Achievements ==
=== BWF International Challenge/Series ===
Women's singles
Year	Tournament	Opponent	Score	Result
2008	Kenya International	(Spain) Yoana Martínez	19–21, 21–14, 21–19	(gold) Winner
2007	Algeria International	(United States) Shannon Pohl	21–12, 21–9	(gold) Winner
2007	Iran Fajr International	(Sri Lanka) Renu Chandrika Hettiarachchige	21–16, 15–21, 21–18	(gold) Winner

Women's doubles
Year	Tournament	Partner	Opponent	Score	Result
2007	Mauritius International	(Slovenia) Maja Tvrdy	(South Africa) Michelle Edwards (South Africa) Chantal Botts	21–16, 21–18	(gold) Winner
2007	Ecuador International	(Portugal) Filipa Lamy	(Peru) Jie Meng (Peru) Valeria Rivero	21–16, 21–11	(gold) Winner

BWF International Challenge tournament
BWF International Series tournament
BWF Future Series tournament
