= Wouter Claes =

Belgian badminton player

Personal information
- Born: 28 October 1975 (age 51) Leuven, Belgium
- Height: 1.80 m (5 ft 11 in)

Sport
- Country: Belgium
- Sport: Badminton
- Handedness: Left

Men's & mixed doubles
- Highest ranking: 21
- BWF profile
Medal record
Men's badminton
Representing Belgium
European Championships
Bronze medal – third place	Manchester 2010	Mixed doubles

Wouter Claes (born 28 October 1975) is a left-handed Belgian badminton player. He won 20 Belgian titles, 10 in the men's doubles with Frédéric Mawet and Ruud Kuijten, 10 in the mixed doubles with Manon Albinus, Corina Herrle and Nathalie Descamps. He won 20 Flemish Championships in singles, men's doubles with Nico Claes and Steven Delsaert and mixed doubles with Nathalie Descamps and Janne Elst. He won a bronze medal in the mixed doubles (together with partner Descamps) during the 2010 European Badminton Championships. This was the first Belgian medal ever won at a European Championship. During his career, he was placed 21 in world ranking.

== Achievements ==
=== European Championships ===
Mixed doubles
Year	Venue	Partner	Opponent	Score	Result
2010	Manchester Evening News Arena; Manchester, England	(Belgium) Nathalie Descamps	(Denmark) Thomas Laybourn (Denmark) Kamilla Rytter Juhl	8–21, 14–21	Bronze

=== BWF International Challenge/Series ===
Men's doubles
Year	Tournament	Partner	Opponent	Score	Result
2001	Belgian International	(Belgium) Frédéric Mawet	(Belgium) Sven van Delsen (Belgium) David Vandewinkel	15–8, 15–11	(gold) Winner
2001	Slovenian International	(Belgium) Frédéric Mawet	(Russia) Stanislav Pukhov (Russia) Nikolai Zuyev	2–7, 7–1, 5–7, 3–7	(silver) Runner-up
2003	Luxembourge Thierry Theis	(Belgium) Frédéric Mawet	(Indonesia) Dharma Gunawi (Germany) Yudianto Yong	15–12, 15–9	(gold) Winner
2003	Giraldilla International	(Belgium) Frédéric Mawet	(Germany) Jochen Cassel (Germany) Joachim Tesche	15–7, 14–17, 15–13	(gold) Winner
2003	Le Volant d'Or de Toulouse	(Belgium) Frédéric Mawet	(France) Jean-Michel Lefort (France) Arif Rasidi	12–15, 15–10, 15–3	(gold) Winner
2004	Luxembourge Thierry Theis	(Belgium) Frédéric Mawet	(Indonesia) Dharma Gunawi (Indonesia) Yoseph Phoa	15–9, 11–15, 14–17	(silver) Runner-up
2005	Spanish International	(Belgium) Frédéric Mawet	(Wales) Matthew Hughes (Wales) Martyn Lewis	11–15, 3–15	(silver) Runner-up
2006	Le Volant d'Or de Toulouse	(Belgium) Frédéric Mawet	(Russia) Vitalij Durkin (Russia) Aleksandr Nikolaenko	21–14, 16–21, 20–22	(silver) Runner-up
2007	Croatian International	(Belgium) Frédéric Mawet	(Germany) Jochen Cassel (Germany) Thomas Tesche	11–21, 22–20, 21–19	(gold) Winner
2007	Finnish International	(Belgium) Frédéric Mawet	(Germany) Tim Dettmann (Germany) Johannes Schöttler	21–16, 21–16	(gold) Winner
2007	Czech International	(Belgium) Frédéric Mawet	(Denmark) Rasmus Bonde (Denmark) Kasper Faust Henriksen	17–21, 21–18, 18–21	(silver) Runner-up
2008	Swedish International	(Belgium) Frédéric Mawet	(Denmark) Rasmus Andersen (Denmark) Peter Steffensen	12–21, 16–21	(silver) Runner-up
2008	Austrian International	(Belgium) Frédéric Mawet	(Indonesia) Fran Kurniawan (Indonesia) Rendra Wijaya	14–21, 11–21	(silver) Runner-up
2008	Le Volant d'Or de Toulouse	(Belgium) Frédéric Mawet	(England) Richard Eidestedt (England) Andrew Ellis	12–21, 12–21	(silver) Runner-up
2008	European Circuit Finals	(Belgium) Frédéric Mawet	(Germany) Kristof Hopp (Germany) Ingo Kindervater	21–16, 14–21, 16–21	(silver) Runner-up

Mixed doubles
Year	Tournament	Partner	Opponent	Score	Result
2001	Belgian International	(Denmark) Karina Sørensen	(Republic of Ireland) Bruce Topping (Republic of Ireland) Jayne Plunkett	15–7, 15–9	(gold) Winner
2006	Dutch International	(Netherlands) Paulien van Dooremalen	(Germany) Kristof Hopp (Germany) Birgit Overzier	18–21, 18–21	(silver) Runner-up
2006	Irish International	(Belgium) Nathalie Descamps	(Netherlands) Ruud Bosch (Netherlands) Ginny Severien	14–21, 21–17, 21–17	(gold) Winner
2007	Croatian International	(Belgium) Nathalie Descamps	(Poland) Adam Cwalina (Poland) Małgorzata Kurdelska	21–13, 16–21, 21–13	(gold) Winner
2007	Irish International	(Belgium) Nathalie Descamps	(United States) Howard Bach (United States) Eva Lee	10–21, 13–21	(silver) Runner-up
2008	Austrian International	(Belgium) Nathalie Descamps	(China) Zhang Yi (China) Cai Jiani	18–21, 18–21	(silver) Runner-up
2008	Spanish Open	(Belgium) Nathalie Descamps	(Indonesia) Rendra Wijaya (Indonesia) Meiliana Jauhari	14–21, 18–21	(silver) Runner-up
2008	European Circuit Finals	(Belgium) Nathalie Descamps	(Russia) Aleksandr Nikolaenko (Russia) Nina Vislova	7–21, 19–21	(silver) Runner-up
2009	Belgian International	(Belgium) Nathalie Descamps	(England) Marcus Ellis (England) Heather Olver	9–21, 23–25	(silver) Runner-up
2010	Banuinvest International	(Belgium) Nathalie Descamps	(Singapore) Chayut Triyachart (Singapore) Yao Lei	13–21, 21–23	(silver) Runner-up

BWF International Challenge tournament
BWF International Series tournament
