= Frédéric Mawet =

Belgian badminton player

Personal information
- Born: 30 July 1977 (age 49)
- Height: 1.86 m (6 ft 1 in)

Sport
- Country: Belgium
- Sport: Badminton
- Handedness: Right

Men's doubles
- Highest ranking: 52
- BWF profile

Frédéric Mawet (born 30 July 1977) is a Belgian badminton player. He won eight times national titles in the men's doubles event partnered with Wouter Claes. In 2008, he became a junior coach in Ligue Francophone Belge de Badminton (LFBB). As a coach, he also brought Yuhan and Lianne Tan to compete at the 2016 Rio Summer Olympics.

== Achievements ==
=== BWF International Challenge/Series ===
Men's doubles
Year	Tournament	Partner	Opponent	Score	Result
2001	Belgian International	(Belgium) Wouter Claes	(Belgium) Sven van Delsen (Belgium) David Vandewinkel	15–8, 15–11	(gold) Winner
2001	Slovenian International	(Belgium) Wouter Claes	(Russia) Stanislav Pukhov (Russia) Nikolai Zuyev	2–7, 7–1, 5–7, 3–7	(silver) Runner-up
2003	Luxembourge Thierry Theis	(Belgium) Wouter Claes	(Indonesia) Dharma Gunawi (Germany) Yudianto Yong	15–12, 15–9	(gold) Winner
2003	Giraldilla International	(Belgium) Wouter Claes	(Germany) Jochen Cassel (Germany) Joachim Tesche	15–7, 14–17, 15–13	(gold) Winner
2003	Le Volant d'Or de Toulouse	(Belgium) Wouter Claes	(France) Jean-Michel Lefort (France) Arif Rasidi	12–15, 15–10, 15–3	(gold) Winner
2004	Luxembourge Thierry Theis	(Belgium) Wouter Claes	(Indonesia) Dharma Gunawi (Indonesia) Yoseph Phoa	15–9, 11–15, 14–17	(silver) Runner-up
2005	Spanish International	(Belgium) Wouter Claes	(Wales) Matthew Hughes (Wales) Martyn Lewis	11–15, 3–15	(silver) Runner-up
2006	Le Volant d'Or de Toulouse	(Belgium) Wouter Claes	(Russia) Vitalij Durkin (Russia) Aleksandr Nikolaenko	21–14, 16–21, 20–22	(silver) Runner-up
2007	Croatian International	(Belgium) Wouter Claes	(Germany) Jochen Cassel (Germany) Thomas Tesche	11–21, 22–20, 21–19	(gold) Winner
2007	Finnish International	(Belgium) Wouter Claes	(Germany) Tim Dettmann (Germany) Johannes Schöttler	21–16, 21–16	(gold) Winner
2007	Czech International	(Belgium) Wouter Claes	(Denmark) Rasmus Bonde (Denmark) Kasper Faust Henriksen	17–21, 21–18, 18–21	(silver) Runner-up
2008	Swedish International	(Belgium) Wouter Claes	(Denmark) Rasmus Andersen (Denmark) Peter Steffensen	12–21, 16–21	(silver) Runner-up
2008	Austrian International	(Belgium) Wouter Claes	(Indonesia) Fran Kurniawan (Indonesia) Rendra Wijaya	14–21, 11–21	(silver) Runner-up
2008	Le Volant d'Or de Toulouse	(Belgium) Wouter Claes	(England) Richard Eidestedt (England) Andrew Ellis	12–21, 12–21	(silver) Runner-up
2008	European Circuit Finals	(Belgium) Wouter Claes	(Germany) Kristof Hopp (Germany) Ingo Kindervater	21–16, 14–21, 16–21	(silver) Runner-up

BWF International Challenge tournament
BWF International Series tournament
