= Fernando Silva (badminton) =

Portuguese badminton player

Personal information
- Nationality: Portuguese
- Born: 17 December 1972 (age 53) Peniche, Portugal
- Height: 174 cm (5 ft 9 in)

Sport
- Sport: Badminton
Medal record
Men's badminton
Representing Portugal
World Senior Championships
Bronze medal – third place	2015 Helsingborg	Men's singles
Bronze medal – third place	2019 Katowice	Men's singles
Bronze medal – third place	2019 Katowice	Mixed doubles
Bronze medal – third place	2021 Huelva	Mixed doubles

Fernando Silva (born 17 December 1972) is a Portuguese badminton player. He competed in two events at the 1992 Summer Olympics. He won 4 bronze medals at the BWF World Senior Championships.

== Career ==
After his participation in the 1992 Olympic Games, Silva partnered with Ricardo Fernandes and won the Slovenian International title in 1994. He later swapped partners with Marco Vasconcelos and won the Portugal International two consecutive times in 1997 and 1998 with Hugo Rodrigues.

== Achievements ==
=== World Senior Championships ===
Men's singles

Year	Venue	Opponent	Score	Result
2015	Helsingborg Arena, Helsingborg, Sweden	(Austria) Jürgen Koch	13–21, 12–21	Bronze
2019	Spodek, Katowice, Poland	(Poland) Dariusz Zięba	23–25, 12–21	Bronze

Mixed doubles

Year	Venue	Partner	Opponent	Score	Result
2019	Spodek, Katowice, Poland	(Portugal) Maria Gomes	(Denmark) Morten Aarup (Denmark) Lene Struwe Andersen	21–15, 20–22, 19–21	Bronze
2021	Palacio de los Deportes Carolina Marín, Huelva, Spain	(Portugal) Maria Gomes	(Netherlands) Gerben Bruijstens (Netherlands) Georgy van Soerland-Trouerbach	15–21, 9–21	Bronze

=== BWF/IBF International Challenge/Series (2 titles, 3 runners-up) ===
Men's singles
Year	Tournament	Opponent	Score	Result
1990	Spanish International	(Austria) Jürgen Koch	6–15, 10–15	(silver) Runner-up
1997	Portugal International	(Denmark) Peter Janum	9–15, 2–15	(silver) Runner-up
1997	Le Volant d'Or de Toulouse	(Switzerland) Thomas Wapp	10–15, 3–15	(silver) Runner-up

Men's doubles
Year	Tournament	Partner	Opponent	Score	Result
1994	Slovenian International	(Portugal) Ricardo Fernandes	(Switzerland) Lawrence Chew (Switzerland) Jorge Rodriguez	16–17, 17–14, 15–4	(gold) Winner
1997	Portugal International	(Portugal) Hugo Rodrigues	(Scotland) Russell Hogg (Scotland) Kenny Middlemiss	Walkover	(gold) Winner
1998	Portugal International	(Portugal) Hugo Rodrigues	(England) James Anderson (England) Ian Pearson	8–15, 11–15	(silver) Runner-up

BWF International Challenge tournament
BWF International Series tournament
BWF Future Series tournament
