= Ajay Mathur =

Indian energy official

2nd Director General of the International Solar Alliance
- In office 15 March 2021 – 15 March 2025
- Preceded by: Upendra Tripathy
- Succeeded by: Ashish Khanna

Ajay Mathur is an Indian energy sector expert who served as the 2nd Director General of the International Solar Alliance. He was formerly the Director General of The Energy and Resources Institute and the Director General of India's Bureau of Energy Efficiency. He has also been a member of the Indian Prime Minister's Council on Climate Change. He was a part of India's negotiating team at the 2015 United Nations Climate Change Conference where the Paris Agreement was signed. He is the author of the book 'Energy Efficiency Matters' along with Leher Thadani.
