= Belgian National Badminton League =

The Belgian National Badminton League, also known as Victor League (sponsored by Victor), is the top interclub competition in Belgian badminton. There are 2 national divisions organized by the Belgian Badminton Federation. All other divisions are organized per region. The competition format was restyled during the season 2007–2008.

== The competition ==
Both national divisions consist of 8 participating clubs. These participate in 7 qualification weekends. After these qualifications, the top 4 teams will play the play-offs for the title. The bottom 4 teams will compete each other in the play-downs to maintain their position in the league.

During each match, 8 confrontations are played: 1 Men's doubles, 1 Women's doubles, 2 Men's Singles, 2 Women's Singles and 2 Mixed Doubles.

== The 2010-2011 clubs ==
For this season, the 8 participating clubs are the following:

Club name	City	Last season's position
CSB Ixelles	Elsene / Ixelles	6th
Everbergse	Everberg	Promoted
Lebad	Heule	2nd
Pluimplukkers	Ghent	5th
Saive	Liège	5th
Webacsa	Wellen	3rd
W & L1	Herent	4th
W & L2	Herent	Promoted

== Past Champions ==
Year	Winner	Runner up
2005-06	CSB Ixelles	OLVE
2006-07	Dropshot	W & L
2007-08	CSB Ixelles	Webacsa
2008-09	Webacsa	W & L
2009-10	Saive	Lebad
2010-11	Saive	W & L 1
