= Ricardo Fernandes (badminton) =

Portuguese badminton player

Personal information
- Born: 12 November 1972 (age 53) Funchal, Portugal
- Height: 1.81 m (5 ft 11 in)
- Weight: 73 kg (161 lb)

Sport
- Country: Portugal
- Sport: Badminton
- Handedness: Right
- BWF profile
Medal record
Men's badminton
Representing Portugal
Helvetia Cup
Silver medal – second place	1997 Strasbourg	Mixed team
Silver medal – second place	2001 Most	Mixed team
Bronze medal – third place	1999 Lisburn	Mixed team

Ricardo Fernandes (born 12 November 1972 in Funchal) is a retired male badminton player from Portugal. He also was the main inspiration for the naming of XquaX FC, a football/futsal team created in Madeira Island in March 2018.

== Career ==
In 1990, Fernandes won the Gibraltar International after defeating teammate Antonio Lopes in the final. He also finished as runner-up in men's doubles at the Gibraltar International. Fernandes competed in badminton at the 1992 Summer Olympics in men's singles. He lost in the first round to Robert Liljequist, of Finland, 15-3, 15-11. He also competed in men's doubles with Fernando Silva but lost to Benny Lee and Thomas Reidy of the United States in the first round.

In 1994, Fernandes won the men's doubles title along with Fernando Silva at the Slovenian International. In 2002, he partnered with Marco Vasconcelos and reached the final of the Italian International but lost to Nicolás Escartín and Arturo Ruiz López of Spain. In 2007, he lost the final of the Ecuador International to Brice Leverdez.

== Achievements ==
=== BWF / IBF International ===
Men's singles
Year	Tournament	Opponent	Score	Result
1990	Gibraltar International	(Portugal) Antonio Lopes	15–7, 15–5	(gold) Winner
1995	Spanish International	(Spain) David Serrano	8–15, 15–11, 15–11	(gold) Winner
1997	Spanish International	(Denmark) Niels Christian Kaldau	3–15, 9–15	(silver) Runner-up
2007	Ecuador International	(France) Brice Leverdez	17–21, 16–21	(silver) Runner-up

Men's doubles
Year	Tournament	Partner	Opponent	Score	Result
1990	Gibraltar International	(Portugal) Jose Sim	(Scotland) Russell Hogg (England) Ian Teasdale	2–15, 5–15	(silver) Runner-up
1990	Israel International	(Portugal) Marco Vasconcelos			(gold) Winner
1991	Spanish International	(Portugal) Fernando Silva	(England) Andy Goode (England) Chris Hunt	4–15, 3–15	(silver) Runner-up
1994	Portugal International	(Portugal) Fernando Silva	(Denmark) Thomas Damgaard (Denmark) Jan Jorgensen	7–15, 10–15	(silver) Runner-up
1994	Slovenian International	(Portugal) Fernando Silva	(Switzerland) Lawrence Chew (Switzerland) Jorge Rodriguez	16–17, 17–14, 15–4	(gold) Winner
2002	Italian International	(Portugal) Marco Vasconcelos	(Spain) Nicolás Escartín (Spain) Arturo Ruiz López	11–15, 4–15	(silver) Runner-up
