= Marco Vasconcelos =

Portuguese badminton player

Personal information
- Born: November 7, 1971 (age 55) Funchal, Portugal
- Height: 171 cm (5 ft 7 in)

Sport
- Country: Portugal
- Sport: Badminton
- Handedness: Right
- Event: Men's singles and doubles

Men's singles and doubles
- BWF profile
Medal record
Men's badminton
Representing Portugal
Helvetia Cup
Bronze medal – third place	2005 Agros	Mixed team

Marco Paulo Pereira Vasconcelos (born 7 November 1971) is a male badminton player from Portugal. Vasconcelos played a big role in helping the Portuguese team to win bronze at the Helvetia Cup in 2005.

In his home country he won 15 titles at the Portuguese National Badminton Championships. Vasconcelos is currently coaching the Brazil national badminton team.

== Career ==
Vasconcelos played badminton at the 2004 Summer Olympics in men's singles, losing in the round of 32 to Richard Vaughan of Great Britain. He also competed in the men's singles at the 2000 and 2008 Olympics, falling in the round of 64 on both occasions.

== Achievements ==
=== BWF/IBF International Challenge/Series (1 title, 5 runners-up) ===
Men's singles
Year	Tournament	Opponent	Score	Result
2006	Iceland International	(Sweden) Magnus Sahlberg	16–21, 21–18, 11–21	(silver) Runner-up
2007	Fiji International	(Australia) Nicholas Kidd		(gold) Winner
2007	Australia International	(New Zealand) John Moody	16–21, 22–20	(silver) Runner-up
2007	Iceland International	(Czech Republic) Petr Koukal	17–21, 16–21	(silver) Runner-up

Men's doubles
Year	Tournament	Partner	Opponent	Score	Result
1990	Israel International	(Portugal) Ricardo Fernandes			(gold) Winner
1995	Spanish International	(Portugal) Hugo Rodrigues	(Iceland) Broddi Kristjánsson (Iceland) Árni Þór Hallgrímson		(silver) Runner-up
2004	Italian International	(Portugal) Alexandre Paixão	(Denmark) Daniel Damgaard-Pedersen (Denmark) Christopher Bruun Jensen	11–15, 14–17	(silver) Runner-up

BWF International Challenge tournament
BWF International Series tournament
BWF Future Series tournament
