= 1988 Uber Cup qualification =

Tournament details
- Dates: 23 – 28 February 1988
- Location: Asian zone: New Delhi American zone: San Jose; European zone: Amsterdam Oceania zone: Melbourne

The qualifying process for the 1988 Uber Cup took place from 23 to 28 February 1988 to decide the final teams which will play in the final tournament.

== Qualification process ==
The qualification process will be divided into four regions, the Asian Zone, the European Zone, the Oceania Zone and the Pan American Zone. Teams in their respective zone will first compete in a round-robin elimination format. The top two teams will advance to the knockout stages to compete for a place in the final tournament to be held in Kuala Lumpur.

China qualified for the final tournament as defending champions while Malaysia qualified as hosts.

=== Qualified teams ===
Country	Qualified as	Qualified on	Final appearance
Malaysia	1988 Uber Cup hosts	6 October 1987	4th
China	1986 Uber Cup winners	4 May 1986	3rd
Japan	Asian Zone winners	27 February 1988	8th
Denmark	European Zone winners	28 February 1988	7th
England	European Zone runners-up	28 February 1988	8th
Netherlands	Third place in European Zone	28 February 1988	1st
Indonesia	Oceania Zone winners	28 February 1988	10th
South Korea	American Zone winners	27 February 1988	3rd

== Asian Zone ==
The qualification rounds for the Asian Zone were held from 23 to 27 February at the Indira Gandhi Indoor Stadium in New Delhi, India. Five teams took part in qualifying for the final tournament.

=== Round robin ===
Pos	Team	Pld	W	L	MF	MA	MD	Pts	Qualification
1	Japan	4	4	0	19	1	+18	4	Final tournament
2	India	4	3	1	13	7	+6	3	
3	Thailand	4	2	2	13	7	+6	2	
4	Sri Lanka	4	1	3	5	15	−10	1	
5	Nepal	4	0	4	0	20	−20	0	

Source: The Straits Times

Thailand
5
Indira Gandhi Indoor Stadium
23 February 1988

Nepal
0

		Result
1	Darunee Lertvoralak	2 – 0 (11–0, 11–4)	Subha Shrestha
2	Piyathip Sansaniyakulvilai	2 – 0 (11–3, 11–1)	Rajani Joshi Shrestha
3	Somharuthai Jaroensiri	2 – 0 (11–0, 11–0)	Seema Rijal
4	Chen Ruizhen; Amporn Kaitpituk	2 – 0 (15–1, 15–2)	Reema Shrestha; Subha Shrestha
5	Somharuthai Jaroensiri; Ladawan Mulasartsatorn	2 – 0 (15–0, 15–1)	Rajani Joshi Shrestha; Rekha Malhotra

India
5
Indira Gandhi Indoor Stadium
23 February 1988

Sri Lanka
0

		Result
1	Madhumita Bisht	2 – 0 (11–2, 11–1)	Sriyani Deepika
2	Seema Bhandari	2 – 0 (11–1, 11–0)	Kaushalya Dissanayake
3	Archana Deodhar	2 – 0 (11–2, 11–3)	Samanthi Rodrigo
4	Madhumita Bisht; Ami Ghia	2 – 0 (15–1, 15–2)	Sriyani Deepika; Kaushalya Dissanayake
5	Mallika Barua; Sudha Padmanabhan	2 – 0 (15–2, 15–4)	Yasintha Liyanage; Samanthi Rodrigo

Japan
5
Indira Gandhi Indoor Stadium
24 February 1988

Sri Lanka
0

		Result
1	Sumiko Kitada	2 – 0 (11–3, 11–0)	Sriyani Deepika
2	Kimiko Jinnai	2 – 0 (11–2, 11–0)	Kaushalya Dissanayake
3	Yoko Koizumi	2 – 0 (11–3, 11–2)	Samanthi Rodrigo
4	Sumiko Kitada; Yoko Koizumi	2 – 0 (15–2, 15–4)	Sriyani Deepika; Kaushalya Dissanayake
5	Kimiko Jinnai; Hisako Takamine	2 – 0 (15–1, 15–1)	Yasintha Liyanage; Samanthi Rodrigo

India
5
Indira Gandhi Indoor Stadium
24 February 1988

Nepal
0

		Result
1	Madhumita Bisht	2 – 0 (11–0, 11–0)	Subha Shrestha
2	Seema Bhandari	2 – 0 (11–0, 11–0)	Reema Shrestha
3	Ami Ghia	2 – 0 (11–1, 11–4)	Rajani Joshi Shrestha
4	Madhumita Bisht; Ami Ghia	2 – 0 (15–4, 15–0)	Reema Shrestha; Subha Shrestha
5	Mallika Barua; Sudha Padmanabhan	2 – 0 (15–3, 15–1)	Rajani Joshi Shrestha; Rekha Malhotra

Thailand
2
Indira Gandhi Indoor Stadium
25 February 1988

India
3

		Result
1	Darunee Lertvoralak	0 – 2 (5–11, 3–11)	Madhumita Bisht
2	Chen Ruizhen	0 – 2 (9–11, 8–11)	Seema Bhandari
3	Somharuthai Jaroensiri	2 – 0 (11–3, 11–5)	Archana Deodhar
4	Chen Ruizhen; Amporn Kaitpituk	1 – 2 (15–11, 9–15, 7–15)	Madhumita Bisht; Ami Ghia
5	Penpan Klangthamniem; Piyathip Sansaniyakulvilai	2 – 0 (15–10, 15–5)	Mallika Barua; Sudha Padmanabhan

Sri Lanka
5
Indira Gandhi Indoor Stadium
25 February 1988

Nepal
0

		Result
1	Sriyani Deepika	2 – 0 (11–3, 11–2)	Subha Shrestha
2	Kaushalya Dissanayake	2 – 0 (11–2, 11–0)	Reema Shrestha
3	Samanthi Rodrigo	2 – 0 (11–4, 11–8)	Rajani Joshi Shrestha
4	Sriyani Deepika; Kaushalya Dissanayake	2 – 0 (15–6, 15–3)	Rajani Joshi Shrestha; Kalpana Rana Shrestha
5	Yasintha Liyanage; Samanthi Rodrigo	2 – 0 (15–3, 15–5)	Reema Shrestha; Subha Shrestha

Japan
4
Indira Gandhi Indoor Stadium
26 February 1988

Thailand
1

		Result
1	Sumiko Kitada	2 – 0 (11–1, 11–2)	Piyathip Sansaniyakulvilai
2	Kimiko Jinnai	2 – 0 (11–4, 11–6)	Chen Ruizhen
3	Kumiko Kitamoto	0 – 2 (10–12, 7–11)	Somharuthai Jaroensiri
4	Sumiko Kitada; Yoko Koizumi	2 – 0 (15–10, 15–9)	Amporn Kaitpituk; Penpan Klangthamniem
5	Kimiko Jinnai; Hisako Takamine	2 – 0 (15–6, 15–10)	Somharuthai Jaroensiri; Piyathip Sansaniyakulvilai

Japan
5
Indira Gandhi Indoor Stadium
26 February 1988

Nepal
0

		Result
1	Sumiko Kitada	2 – 0 (11–0, 11–1)	Subha Shrestha
2	Kimiko Jinnai	2 – 0 (11–1, 11–0)	Reema Shrestha
3	Yoko Koizumi	2 – 0 (11–1, 11–0)	Rajani Joshi Shrestha
4	Kimiko Jinnai; Hisako Takamine	2 – 0 (15–1, 15–0)	Reema Shrestha; Subha Shrestha
5	Hideyo Noguchi; Kumiko Kitamoto	2 – 0 (15–0, 15–2)	Rajani Joshi Shrestha; Rekha Malhotra

Japan
5
Indira Gandhi Indoor Stadium
27 February 1988

India
0

		Result
1	Sumiko Kitada	2 – 1 (8–11, 12–10, 11–4)	Madhumita Bisht
2	Kimiko Jinnai	2 – 0 (11–7, 11–2)	Seema Bhandari
3	Hideyo Noguchi	2 – 0 (11–8, 11–2)	Ami Ghia
4	Sumiko Kitada; Yoko Koizumi	2 – 0 (15–2, 15–1)	Mallika Barua; Sudha Padmanabhan
5	Kimiko Jinnai; Hisako Takamine	2 – 0 (15–7, 15–2)	Seema Bhandari; Madhumita Bisht

Thailand
5
Indira Gandhi Indoor Stadium
27 February 1988

Sri Lanka
0

		Result
1	Darunee Lertvoralak	2 – 0	Sriyani Deepika
2	Chen Ruizhen	2 – 0	Kaushalya Dissanayake
3	Somharuthai Jaroensiri	2 – 0	Samanthi Rodrigo
4	Chen Ruizhen; Amporn Kaitpituk	2 – 0	Sriyani Deepika; Kaushalya Dissanayake
5	Penpan Klangthamniem; Piyathip Sansaniyakulvilai	2 – 0	Yasintha Liyanage; Samanthi Rodrigo

== European Zone ==
The European qualifying rounds were held in Sporthallen Zuid in Amsterdam, Netherlands. Eighteen teams took part in the qualifiers with Spain making their debut in the competition.

=== Group stage ===
==== Group A ====
Pos	Team	Pld	W	L	MF	MA	MD	Pts	Qualification
1	Denmark	3	3	0	15	0	+15	3	Advance to knockout stage
2	West Germany	3	2	1	10	5	+5	2	
3	Switzerland	3	1	2	5	10	−5	1	
4	Spain	3	0	3	0	15	−15	0	

Source: The Straits Times

West Germany
5
Sporthallen Zuid
24 February 1988

Spain
0

		Result
1	Katrin Schmidt	2 – 0	Aída Rodríguez
2	Kirsten Schmieder	2 – 0	Leonor Gallardo
3	Nicole Baldewein	2 – 0	Maria Emilia Gómez
4	Katrin Schmidt; Kirsten Schmieder	2 – 0	Leonor Gallardo; Maria Emilia Gómez
5	Mechtild Hagemann; Cathrin Hoppe	2 – 0	Nuria García; Aída Rodríguez

Denmark
5
Sporthallen Zuid
24 February 1988

Switzerland
0

		Result
1	Kirsten Larsen	2 – 0	Bettina Villars
2	Pernille Nedergaard	2 – 0	Nicole Zahno
3	Charlotte Hattens	2 – 0	Charlotte Pedersen
4	Dorte Kjær; Nettie Nielsen	2 – 0	Charlotte Pedersen; Nicole Zahno
5	Grete Mogensen; Gitte Paulsen	2 – 0	Silvia Albrecht; Charlotte Pedersen

West Germany
5
Sporthallen Zuid
25 February 1988

Switzerland
0

		Result
1	Katrin Schmidt	2 – 0	Bettina Villars
2	Kirsten Schmieder	2 – 0	Nicole Zahno
3	Mechtild Hagemann	2 – 0	Charlotte Pedersen
4	Katrin Schmidt; Kirsten Schmieder	2 – 0	Charlotte Pedersen; Nicole Zahno
5	Nicole Baldewein; Cathrin Hoppe	2 – 0	Silvia Albrecht; Bettina Villars

Denmark
5
Sporthallen Zuid
25 February 1988

Spain
0

		Result
1	Kirsten Larsen	2 – 0	Aída Rodríguez
2	Christina Bostofte	2 – 0	Leonor Gallardo
3	Lisbet Stuer-Lauridsen	2 – 0	Maria Emilia Gómez
4	Dorte Kjær; Nettie Nielsen	2 – 0	Leonor Gallardo; Maria Emilia Gómez
5	Grete Mogensen; Cathrin Hoppe	2 – 0	Nuria García; Aída Rodríguez

Denmark
5
Sporthallen Zuid
26 February 1988

West Germany
0

		Result
1	Kirsten Larsen	2 – 0	Katrin Schmidt
2	Pernille Nedergaard	2 – 0	Kirsten Schmieder
3	Charlotte Hattens	2 – 0	Nicole Baldewein
4	Dorte Kjær; Nettie Nielsen	2 – 0	Katrin Schmidt; Kirsten Schmieder
5	Grete Mogensen; Gitte Paulsen	2 – 0	Mechtild Hagemann; Cathrin Hoppe

Switzerland
5
Sporthallen Zuid
26 February 1988

Spain
0

		Result
1	Bettina Villars	2 – 0	Aída Rodríguez
2	Nicole Zahno	2 – 0	Leonor Gallardo
3	Charlotte Pedersen	2 – 0	Maria Emilia Gómez
4	Charlotte Pedersen; Nicole Zahno	2 – 0	Leonor Gallardo; Maria Emilia Gómez
5	Silvia Albrecht; Bettina Villars	2 – 0	Nuria García; Aída Rodríguez

==== Group B ====
Pos	Team	Pld	W	L	MF	MA	MD	Pts	Qualification
1	Netherlands	4	4	0	19	1	+18	4	Advance to knockout stage
2	Soviet Union	4	3	1	16	4	+12	3	
3	Finland	4	2	2	7	13	−6	2	
4	Norway	4	1	3	6	14	−8	1	
5	Austria	4	0	4	2	18	−16	0	

Source: The Straits Times

Netherlands
5
Sporthallen Zuid
24 February 1988

Finland
0

		Result
1	Eline Coene	2 – 0 (11–2, 11–1)	Nina Sundberg
2	Astrid van der Knaap	2 – 0 (11–2, 11–1)	Ulrika von Pfaler
3	Monique Hoogland	2 – 0 (11–4, 11–2)	Christina von Pfaler
4	Eline Coene; Erica van Dijck	2 – 0 (15–0, 15–1)	Kristiina Tainio; Ulrika von Pfaler
5	Monique Hoogland; Astrid van der Knaap	2 – 0 (15–3, 15–8)	Marja Rydman; Christina von Pfaler

Soviet Union
5
Sporthallen Zuid
24 February 1988

Norway
0

		Result
1	Vlada Beljutina	2 – 1	Ellen Berg
2	Elena Rybkina	2 – 0	Marianne Wikdal
3	Svetlana Beliasova	2 – 0	Gry Kirsti Solberg
4	Svetlana Beliasova; Elena Rybkina	2 – 0	Kari Johansen; Marianne Wikdal
5	Vlada Beljutina; Viktoria Pron	2 – 0	Ellen Berg; Gro Storvik

Netherlands
5
Sporthallen Zuid
24 February 1988

Austria
0

		Result
1	Astrid van der Knaap	2 – 0 (11–3, 11–0)	Brigitte Lackner
2	Monique Hoogland	2 – 0 (11–2, 11–4)	Sabine Ploner
3	Erica van Dijck	2 – 0 (11–2, 11–5)	Gabriele Kumpfmüller
4	Eline Coene; Erica van Dijck	2 – 0 (15–2, 15–2)	Gabriele Kumpfmüller; Sabine Ploner
5	Maaike de Boer; Paula Rip	2 – 0 (15–1, 15–3)	Birgit Gruber; Manuela Lassinger

Soviet Union
5
Sporthallen Zuid
24 February 1988

Finland
0

		Result
1	Irina Serova	2 – 0	Nina Sundberg
2	Vlada Beljutina	2 – 0	Ulrika von Pfaler
3	Elena Rybkina	2 – 0	Christina von Pfaler
4	Svetlana Beliasova; Elena Rybkina	2 – 0	Kristiina Tainio; Ulrika von Pfaler
5	Vlada Beljutina; Viktoria Pron	2 – 0	Marja Rydman; Christina von Pfaler

Norway
2
Sporthallen Zuid
25 February 1988

Finland
3

		Result
1	Ellen Berg	0 – 2 (2–11, 4–11)	Nina Sundberg
2	Marianne Wikdal	2 – 0 (11–1, 11–4)	Kristiina Tainio
3	Gry Kirsti Solberg	0 – 2 (11–4, 11–2)	Christina von Pfaler
4	Kari Johansen; Marianne Wikdal	1 – 2 (15–18, 17–16, 5–15)	Kristiina Tainio; Ulrika von Pfaler
5	Ellen Berg; Gro Storvik	2 – 1 (13–15, 15–12, 15–9)	Nina Sundberg; Christina von Pfaler

Soviet Union
5
Sporthallen Zuid
25 February 1988

Austria
0

		Result
1	Irina Serova	2 – 0	Brigitte Lackner
2	Vlada Beljutina	2 – 0	Sabine Ploner
3	Elena Rybkina	2 – 0	Gabriele Kumpfmüller
4	Svetlana Beliasova; Elena Rybkina	2 – 0	Gabriele Kumpfmüller; Sabine Ploner
5	Vlada Beljutina; Viktoria Pron	2 – 0	Birgit Gruber; Manuela Lassinger

Netherlands
5
Sporthallen Zuid
25 February 1988

Norway
0

		Result
1	Eline Coene	2 – 0 (11–1, 11–2)	Ellen Berg
2	Astrid van der Knaap	2 – 0 (11–0, 11–3)	Gry Kirsti Solberg
3	Monique Hoogland	2 – 0 (11–0, 11–3)	Gro Storvik
4	Eline Coene; Erica van Dijck	2 – 0 (15–0, 15–2)	Kari Johansen; Marianne Wikdal
5	Monique Hoogland; Astrid van der Knaap	2 – 0 (15–1, 15–0)	Ellen Berg; Gro Storvik

Austria
1
Sporthallen Zuid
26 February 1988

Finland
4

		Result
1	Brigitte Lackner	1 – 2	Nina Sundberg
2	Sabine Ploner	0 – 2	Ulrika von Pfaler
3	Gabriele Kumpfmüller	0 – 2	Christina von Pfaler
4	Gabriele Kumpfmüller; Sabine Ploner	2 – 1	Kristiina Tainio; Ulrika von Pfaler
5	Birgit Gruber; Manuela Lassinger	0 – 2	Marja Rydman; Christina von Pfaler

Netherlands
5
Sporthallen Zuid
27 February 1988

Soviet Union
0

		Result
1	Eline Coene	2 – 0 (11–0, 11–3)	Irina Serova
2	Astrid van der Knaap	2 – 0 (11–5, 11–7)	Vlada Beljutina
3	Monique Hoogland	2 – 0 (11–8, 3–11, 8–11)	Elena Rybkina
4	Eline Coene; Erica van Dijck	2 – 0 (15–7, 15–9)	Kristiina Tainio; Ulrika von Pfaler
5	Monique Hoogland; Astrid van der Knaap	2 – 1 (15–7, 5–15, 15–13)	Vlada Beljutina; Viktoria Pron

Norway
4
Sporthallen Zuid
27 February 1988

Austria
1

		Result
1	Ellen Berg	2 – 0 (11–3, 11–5)	Brigitte Lackner
2	Marianne Wikdal	2 – 0 (11–2, 11–1)	Sabine Ploner
3	Gro Storvik	0 – 2 (4–11, 6–11)	Gabriele Kumpfmüller
4	Kari Johansen; Marianne Wikdal	2 – 1 (8–15, 15–7, 15–4)	Gabriele Kumpfmüller; Sabine Ploner
5	Ellen Berg; Gro Storvik	2 – 0 (15–7, 15–8)	Birgit Gruber; Manuela Lassinger

==== Group C ====
Pos	Team	Pld	W	L	MF	MA	MD	Pts	Qualification
1	Sweden	4	4	0	19	1	+18	4	Advance to knockout stage
2	Scotland	4	3	1	16	4	+12	3	
3	France	4	2	2	9	11	−2	2	
4	Belgium	4	1	3	6	14	−8	1	
5	Kenya	4	0	4	0	20	−20	0	

Source: The Straits Times

Sweden
5
Sporthallen Zuid
24 February 1988

Kenya
0

		Result
1	Charlotta Wihlborg	2 – 0 (11–0, 11–0)	Christine Joshi
2	Margit Borg	2 – 0 (11–0, 11–0)	Shamin Noormohamed
3	Maria Henning	2 – 0 (11–0, 11–0)	Sheetal Dhanani
4	Maria Bengtsson; Christine Magnusson	2 – 0 (15–3, 15–0)	Christine Joshi; Fatma Juma
5	Karin Eriksson; Charlotta Wihlborg	2 – 0 (15–2, 15–0)	Sheetal Dhanani; Shamin Noormohamed

Scotland
5
Sporthallen Zuid
24 February 1988

Belgium
0

		Result
1	Gillian Martin	2 – 0 (11–1, 11–3)	Marie-Christine Donnay
2	Anne Gibson	2 – 0 (11–3, 11–2)	Christine Jacobs
3	Elinor Allen	2 – 0 (11–3, 11–3)	Ingrid Rogiers
4	Elinor Allen; Jennifer Allen	2 – 0 (15–7, 15–6)	Marie-Christine Donnay; Christine Jacobs
5	Alison Fulton; Pamela Wyatt	2 – 0 (15–6, 15–7)	Fabienne Ringoot; Ingrid Rogiers

Sweden
5
Sporthallen Zuid
24 February 1988

France
0

		Result
1	Christine Magnusson	2 – 0 (11–3, 11–1)	Rosita Rios
2	Margit Borg	2 – 0 (11–0, 11–2)	Élodie Mansuy
3	Maria Henning	2 – 0 (11–0, 11–2)	Christelle Szynal
4	Maria Bengtsson; Christine Magnusson	2 – 0 (15–1, 15–7)	Élodie Mansuy; Rosita Rios
5	Lilian Johansson; Charlotta Wihlborg	2 – 0 (15–3, 15–10)	Anne Méniane; Christelle Szynal

Scotland
5
Sporthallen Zuid
24 February 1988

Kenya
0

		Result
1	Gillian Martin	2 – 0 (11–0, 11–2)	Shamin Noormohamed
2	Anne Gibson	2 – 0 (11–0, 11–0)	Fatma Juma
3	Elinor Allen	2 – 0 (11–0, 11–0)	Sheetal Dhanani
4	Elinor Allen; Jennifer Allen	2 – 0 (15–6, 15–0)	Fatma Juma; Shamin Noormohamed
5	Alison Fulton; Pamela Wyatt	– (Walkover)	Sheetal Dhanani; Christine Joshi

Belgium
5
Sporthallen Zuid
25 February 1988

Kenya
0

		Result
1	Marie-Christine Donnay	2 – 0	Shamin Noormohamed
2	Christine Jacobs	2 – 0	Fatma Juma
3	Ingrid Rogiers	2 – 0	Sheetal Dhanani
4	Marie-Christine Donnay; Christine Jacobs	2 – 0	Shamin Noormohamed; Fatma Juma
5	Fabienne Ringoot; Ingrid Rogiers	– (Walkover)	Sheetal Dhanani; Christine Joshi

Scotland
5
Sporthallen Zuid
25 February 1988

France
0

		Result
1	Gillian Martin	2 – 0 (11–1, 11–1)	Rosita Rios
2	Anne Gibson	2 – 0 (11–0, 11–5)	Élodie Mansuy
3	Jennifer Allen	2 – 0 (11–3, 11–7)	Christelle Szynal
4	Elinor Allen; Jennifer Allen	2 – 0 (15–3, 15–5)	Élodie Mansuy; Rosita Rios
5	Alison Fulton; Pamela Wyatt	2 – 0 (15–7, 15–3)	Cécilia Brun; Christelle Szynal

France
5
Sporthallen Zuid
25 February 1988

Kenya
0

		Result
1	Rosita Rios	2 – 0	Shamin Noormohamed
2	Élodie Mansuy	2 – 0	Fatma Juma
3	Christelle Szynal	2 – 0	Sheetal Dhanani
4	Élodie Mansuy; Rosita Rios	2 – 0	Shamin Noormohamed; Fatma Juma
5	Anne Méniane; Christelle Szynal	– (Walkover)	Sheetal Dhanani; Christine Joshi

Sweden
5
Sporthallen Zuid
25 February 1988

Belgium
0

		Result
1	Charlotta Wihlborg	2 – 0 (11–1, 11–2)	Marie-Christine Donnay
2	Margit Borg	2 – 0 (11–2, 11–5)	Christine Jacobs
3	Maria Henning	2 – 0 (11–1, 11–2)	Fabienne Ringoot
4	Maria Bengtsson; Christine Magnusson	2 – 0 (15–0, 15–4)	Marie-Christine Donnay; Christine Jacobs
5	Lilian Johansson; Charlotta Wihlborg	2 – 0 (15–1, 15–2)	Fabienne Ringoot; Ingrid Rogiers

Sweden
4
Sporthallen Zuid
26 February 1988

Scotland
1

		Result
1	Christine Magnusson	2 – 0 (11–3, 11–3)	Gillian Martin
2	Charlotta Wihlborg	2 – 0 (11–6, 12–10)	Anne Gibson
3	Margit Borg	1 – 2 (11–4, 4–11, 11–3)	Jennifer Allen
4	Maria Bengtsson; Christine Magnusson	2 – 1 (12–15, 15–2, 15–7)	Elinor Allen; Jennifer Allen
5	Karin Eriksson; Charlotta Wihlborg	2 – 0 (18–16, 15–9)	Alison Fulton; Pamela Wyatt

Belgium
1
Sporthallen Zuid
26 February 1988

France
4

		Result
1	Marie-Christine Donnay	1 – 2	Rosita Rios
2	Christine Jacobs	0 – 2	Élodie Mansuy
3	Ingrid Rogiers	1 – 2	Christelle Szynal
4	Marie-Christine Donnay; Christine Jacobs	2 – 1	Élodie Mansuy; Rosita Rios
5	Fabienne Ringoot; Ingrid Rogiers	1 – 2	Anne Méniane; Christelle Szynal

==== Group D ====
Pos	Team	Pld	W	L	MF	MA	MD	Pts	Qualification
1	England	3	3	0	15	0	+15	3	Advance to knockout stage
2	Ireland	3	2	1	10	5	+5	2	
3	Iceland	3	1	2	3	12	−9	1	
4	Wales	3	0	3	2	13	−11	0	

Source: The Straits Times

Ireland
5
Sporthallen Zuid
24 February 1988

Wales
0

		Result
1	Maeve Moynihan	2 – 0 (11–8, 11–4)	Cathy Vigar
2	Holly Lane	2 – 0 (11–4, 11–4)	Gail Davies
3	Ann O'Sullivan	2 – 0 (11–2, 11–2)	Sarah Doody
4	Holly Lane; Ann O'Sullivan	2 – 0 (15–8, 15–11)	Sarah Doody; Caroline Watson
5	Maeve Moynihan; Ann Stephens	2 – 0 (17–16, 15–12)	Claire Hybart; Lisa Rees

England
5
Sporthallen Zuid
24 February 1988

Iceland
0

		Result
1	Fiona Elliott	2 – 0	Þórdís Edwald
2	Helen Troke	2 – 0	Guðrún Júlíusdóttir
3	Julie Munday	2 – 0	Elisabet Þórðardóttir
4	Gillian Clark; Sara Halsall	2 – 0	Þórdís Edwald; Elisabet Þórðardóttir
5	Cheryl Johnson; Claire Palmer	2 – 0	Guðrún Júlíusdóttir; Kristín Magnúsdóttir

England
5
Sporthallen Zuid
25 February 1988

Wales
0

		Result
1	Fiona Elliott	2 – 0 (11–1, 11–3)	Cathy Vigar
2	Helen Troke	2 – 0 (11–0, 11–3)	Gail Davies
3	Julie Munday	2 – 0 (11–4, 11–0)	Claire Hybart
4	Gillian Clark; Sara Halsall	2 – 0 (15–6, 15–6)	Sarah Doody; Caroline Watson
5	Gillian Gowers; Cheryl Johnson	2 – 0 (15–1, 15–3)	Claire Hybart; Lisa Rees

Ireland
5
Sporthallen Zuid
25 February 1988

Iceland
0

		Result
1	Maeve Moynihan	2 – 0	Þórdís Edwald
2	Holly Lane	2 – 0	Guðrún Júlíusdóttir
3	Ann O'Sullivan	2 – 0	Elisabet Þórðardóttir
4	Holly Lane; Ann O'Sullivan	2 – 0	Þórdís Edwald; Elisabet Þórðardóttir
5	Maeve Moynihan; Ann Stephens	2 – 0	Guðrún Júlíusdóttir; Kristín Magnúsdóttir

England
4
Sporthallen Zuid
26 February 1988

Ireland
1

		Result
1	Fiona Elliott	2 – 0 (11–0, 11–0)	Maeve Moynihan
2	Helen Troke	2 – 0 (11–0, 11–3)	Holly Lane
3	Sally Podger	2 – 0 (11–1, 11–2)	Ann O'Sullivan
4	Gillian Clark; Gillian Gowers	2 – 0 (15–2, 15–1)	Holly Lane; Ann O'Sullivan
5	Fiona Elliott; Sara Halsall	2 – 0 (15–0, 15–3)	Maeve Moynihan; Ann Stephens

Iceland
3
Sporthallen Zuid
26 February 1988

Wales
2

		Result
1	Þórdís Edwald	2 – 1 (8–11, 11–7, 11–6)	Cathy Vigar
2	Guðrún Júlíusdóttir	2 – 0 (11–6, 11–3)	Sarah Doody
3	Elisabet Þórðardóttir	1 – 2 (11–6, 4–11, 10–12)	Gail Davies
4	Kristín Kristjánsdóttir; Kristín Magnúsdóttir	2 – 0 (15–11, 15–8)	Claire Hybart; Lisa Rees
5	Þórdís Edwald; Elisabet Þórðardóttir	0 – 2 (15–17, 4–15)	Sarah Doody; Caroline Watson

=== Knockout stage ===
Semi-finals
Denmark	4
Netherlands	1
Sweden	0
England	5

Final
Denmark	3
England	2
Third place
Netherlands	3
Sweden	2

==== Semi-finals ====
Denmark
4
Sporthallen Zuid
27 February 1988

Netherlands
1

		Result
1	Kirsten Larsen	2 – 0 (11–3, 12–10)	Eline Coene
2	Christina Bostofte	0 – 2 (6–11, 11–12)	Astrid van der Knaap
3	Charlotte Hattens	2 – 0 (11–7, 11–8)	Monique Hoogland
4	Dorte Kjær; Nettie Nielsen	2 – 0 (15–6, 15–8)	Eline Coene; Erica van Dijck
5	Grete Mogensen; Gitte Paulsen	2 – 0 (15–6, 15–9)	Monique Hoogland; Astrid van der Knaap

England
5
Sporthallen Zuid
27 February 1988

Sweden
0

		Result
1	Fiona Elliott	2 – 0 (11–7, 11–9)	Christine Magnusson
2	Helen Troke	2 – 0 (11–1, 11–2)	Charlotta Wihlborg
3	Sally Podger	2 – 1 (11–3, 7–11, 11–5)	Maria Henning
4	Gillian Clark; Gillian Gowers	2 – 0 (15–9, 15–8)	Maria Bengtsson; Christine Magnusson
5	Fiona Elliott; Sara Halsall	2 – 0 (15–2, 15–5)	Karin Eriksson; Lilian Johansson

==== Third place ====
Sweden
2
Sporthallen Zuid
28 February 1988

Netherlands
3

		Result
1	Christine Magnusson	0 – 2 (6–11, 9–12)	Eline Coene
2	Charlotta Wihlborg	0 – 2 (2–11, 7–11)	Astrid van der Knaap
3	Maria Henning	2 – 0 (11–7, 11–7)	Monique Hoogland
4	Maria Bengtsson; Christine Magnusson	2 – 1 (6–15, 17–15, 13–15)	Eline Coene; Erica van Dijck
5	Karin Eriksson; Charlotta Wihlborg	0 – 2 (14–18, 17–18)	Monique Hoogland; Astrid van der Knaap

==== Final ====
Denmark
3
Sporthallen Zuid
28 February 1988

England
2

		Result
1	Kirsten Larsen	2 – 0 (11–2, 11–1)	Fiona Elliott
2	Pernille Nedergaard	2 – 1 (11–4, 9–12, 11–4)	Helen Troke
3	Charlotte Hattens	0 – 2 (8–11, 8–11)	Sally Podger
4	Dorte Kjær; Nettie Nielsen	2 – 0 (15–10, 17–14)	Gillian Clark; Gillian Gowers
5	Grete Mogensen; Gitte Paulsen	0 – 2 (12–15, 4–15)	Fiona Elliott; Sara Halsall

== Oceania Zone ==
The qualification rounds for the Oceania Zone were held from 26 to 28 February at the Altona Hall in Melbourne, Australia. Three teams took part in qualifying for the final tournament.

=== Round robin ===
Pos	Team	Pld	W	L	MF	MA	MD	Pts	Qualification
1	Indonesia	2	2	0	10	0	+10	2	Final tournament
2	Australia	2	1	1	4	6	−2	1	
3	New Zealand	2	0	2	1	9	−8	0	

Source: The Straits Times

Indonesia
5
Altona Hall
26 February 1988

New Zealand
0

		Result
1	Elizabeth Latief	2 – 0 (11–4, 11–1)	Lynne Bignell
2	Susi Susanti	2 – 0 (11–2, 11–1)	Katrin Lockey
3	Kho Mei Hwa	2 – 0 (11–8, 11–6)	Julie Still
4	Verawaty Fadjrin; Rosiana Tendean	2 – 0 (15–3, 15–3)	Lynne Bignell; Katrin Lockey
5	Erma Sulistianingsih; Susi Susanti	2 – 0 (15–3, 15–4)	Jane Clarke; Rhona Robertson

New Zealand
1
Altona Hall
27 February 1988

Australia
4

		Result
1	Lynne Bignell	0 – 2 (5–11, 5–11)	Rhonda Cator
2	Katrin Lockey	0 – 2 (7–11, 8–11)	Lisa Bryant
3	Julie Still	0 – 2 (9–12, 3–11)	Linda Best
4	Lynne Bignell; Katrin Lockey	2 – 0 (15–9, 17–14)	Rhonda Cator; Julie McDonald
5	Jane Clarke; Rhona Robertson	1 – 2 (12–15, 18–17, 5–15)	Lisa Bryant; Tracey Small

Indonesia
5
Altona Hall
28 February 1988

Australia
0

		Result
1	Sarwendah Kusumawardhani	2 – 0 (11–6, 11–4)	Rhonda Cator
2	Susi Susanti	2 – 0 (11–3, 11–1)	Lisa Bryant
3	Kho Mei Hwa	2 – 0 (11–3, 11–2)	Linda Best
4	Verawaty Fadjrin; Rosiana Tendean	2 – 0 (15–1, 15–6)	Rhonda Cator; Julie McDonald
5	Yanti Kusmiati; Erma Sulistianingsih	2 – 0 (15–7, 15–7)	Lisa Bryant; Tracey Small

== Pan American Zone ==
The qualifying rounds for the Pan American zone were held at the San Jose Convention and Cultural Center in San Jose, United States. Five teams competed in qualifying for the final tournament.

=== Round robin ===
Pos	Team	Pld	W	L	MF	MA	MD	Pts	Qualification
1	South Korea	4	4	0	20	0	+20	4	Final tournament
2	Canada	4	3	1	14	6	+8	3	
3	Chinese Taipei	4	2	2	10	10	0	2	
4	Hong Kong	4	1	3	6	14	−8	1	
5	United States	4	0	4	0	20	−20	0	

Source: The Straits Times

South Korea
5
San Jose Convention and Cultural Center
23 February 1988

United States
0

		Result
1	Hwang Hye-young	2 – 0	Joy Kitzmiller
2	Lee Young-suk	2 – 0	Linda Safarik-Tong
3	Chung So-young	2 – 0	Liz Aronsohn
4	Chung Myung-hee; Hwang Hye-young	2 – 0	Judianne Kelly; Nina Loik
5	Cho Young-suk; Chung So-young	2 – 0	Ann French; Pam Owens

Canada
4
San Jose Convention and Cultural Center
23 February 1988

Chinese Taipei
1

		Result
1	Denyse Julien	2 – 0 (11–6, 11–4)	Feng Mei-ying
2	Claire Sharpe	2 – 0 (11–8, 11–5)	Lee Chien-mei
3	Doris Piché	2 – 0 (11–6, 11–2)	Sun Tsai-ching
4	Johanne Falardeau; Denyse Julien	2 – 0 (15–7, 15–12)	Feng Mei-ying; Lin Hui-hsu
5	Linda Cloutier; Claire Sharpe	1 – 2 (10–15, 15–6, 11–15)	Kang Chia-i; Lee Chien-mei

Canada
5
San Jose Convention and Cultural Center
24 February 1988

United States
0

		Result
1	Denyse Julien	2 – 0	Joy Kitzmiller
2	Claire Sharpe	2 – 0	Linda Safarik-Tong
3	Doris Piché	2 – 0	Liz Aronsohn
4	Johanne Falardeau; Denyse Julien	2 – 0	Judianne Kelly; Nina Loik
5	Linda Cloutier; Claire Sharpe	2 – 0	Ann French; Pam Owens

Chinese Taipei
4
San Jose Convention and Cultural Center
24 February 1988

Hong Kong
1

		Result
1	Feng Mei-ying	2 – 0	Amy Chan
2	Chu Shao-chun	1 – 2	Tong Chun Mui
3	Wu Ching-chie	2 – 0	Chan Siu Chun
4	Feng Mei-ying; Lin Hui-hsu	2 – 0	Tong Chun Mui; Wong Har Ping
5	Kang Chia-i; Lee Chien-mei	2 – 0	Amy Chan; Chan Siu Chun

South Korea
5
San Jose Convention and Cultural Center
25 February 1988

Chinese Taipei
0

		Result
1	Hwang Hye-young	2 – 0 (11–3, 11–5)	Feng Mei-ying
2	Lee Young-suk	2 – 0 (11–0, 11–1)	Chu Shao-chun
3	Chung So-young	2 – 0 (11–7, 11–8)	Wu Ching-chie
4	Chung Myung-hee; Hwang Hye-young	2 – 0 (15–4, 15–3)	Feng Mei-ying; Lin Hui-hsu
5	Cho Young-suk; Chung So-young	2 – 0 (15–6, 15–5)	Kang Chia-i; Lee Chien-mei

Hong Kong
5
San Jose Convention and Cultural Center
25 February 1988

United States
0

		Result
1	Amy Chan	2 – 0 (11–4, 11–9)	Joy Kitzmiller
2	Tong Chun Mui	2 – 0 (11–7, 11–3)	Linda Safarik-Tong
3	Chan Siu Chun	2 – 0 (11–5, 11–6)	Liz Aronsohn
4	Tong Chun Mui; Wong Har Ping	2 – 1 (12–15, 15–1, 15–11)	Judianne Kelly; Nina Loik
5	Amy Chan; Chan Siu Chun	2 – 1 (15–8, 13–15, 15–4)	Ann French; Pam Owens

South Korea
5
San Jose Convention and Cultural Center
26 February 1988

Hong Kong
0

		Result
1	Hwang Hye-young	2 – 0 (11–4, 11–1)	Amy Chan
2	Lee Young-suk	2 – 0 (11–2, 11–0)	Cheng Yin Sat
3	Chung So-young	2 – 0 (11–1, 11–3)	Chan Siu Chun
4	Chun Sung-suk; Chung Myung-hee	2 – 0 (15–4, 15–0)	Tong Chun Mui; Wong Har Ping
5	Cho Young-suk; Chung So-young	2 – 0 (15–2, 15–10)	Amy Chan; Chan Siu Chun

Chinese Taipei
5
San Jose Convention and Cultural Center
26 February 1988

United States
0

		Result
1	Feng Mei-ying	2 – 0 (11–4, 11–1)	Joy Kitzmiller
2	Wu Ching-chie	2 – 0 (11–9, 11–8)	Linda Safarik-Tong
3	Chen Yu-jen	2 – 1 (11–7, 10–12, 11–7)	Liz Aronsohn
4	Kang Chia-i; Lee Chien-mei	2 – 0 (15–3, 15–4)	Judianne Kelly; Nina Loik
5	Feng Mei-ying; Lin Hui-hsu	2 – 0 (15–7, 15–9)	Ann French; Pam Owens

South Korea
5
San Jose Convention and Cultural Center
27 February 1988

Canada
0

		Result
1	Hwang Hye-young	2 – 0 (11–4, 11–7)	Denyse Julien
2	Lee Young-suk	2 – 0 (11–7, 11–6)	Claire Sharpe
3	Chung So-young	2 – 0 (11–5, 11–4)	Doris Piché
4	Chung Myung-hee; Hwang Hye-young	2 – 0 (15–9, 15–10)	Johanne Falardeau; Claire Sharpe
5	Cho Young-suk; Chun Sung-suk	2 – 0 (15–2, 15–11)	Linda Cloutier; Denyse Julien

Canada
5
San Jose Convention and Cultural Center
27 February 1988

Hong Kong
0

		Result
1	Denyse Julien	2 – 1	Amy Chan
2	Claire Sharpe	2 – 0	Tong Chun Mui
3	Doris Piché	2 – 0	Chan Siu Chun
4	Johanne Falardeau; Denyse Julien	2 – 0	Tong Chun Mui; Wong Har Ping
5	Linda Cloutier; Claire Sharpe	2 – 0	Amy Chan; Chan Siu Chun
