= USSR National Badminton Championships =

USSR National Badminton Championships was a tournament conducted between 1963 and 1991. After the end of the Soviet Union, the majority of the former Soviet Republics started own championships like the Azerbaijani National Badminton Championships, Armenian National Badminton Championships, Georgian National Badminton Championships, Moldovan National Badminton Championships and Latvian National Badminton Championships.

== Past winners ==
Year	Men's singles	Women's singles	Men's doubles	Women's doubles	Mixed doubles
1963	Nikolaj Sokolov	Margarita Zarubo	Nikolay Peshekhonov; Anatoli Yershov	Margarita Zarubo; Tatjana Smyshlayeva	Vladimir Demin; Marina Demina
1964	Nikolaj Nikitin	Margarita Zarubo	Nikolay Peshekhonov; Anatoli Yershov	Valentina Korovkina; T. Avdyunina	Vladimir Demin; Marina Demina
1965	Konstantin Vavilov	Tatyana Novikova	Vladimir Livshitz; Juri Yermolayev	Agnija Kartzub; O. Marcheva	Nikolay Nikitin; Tatjana Smyshlayeva
1966	Konstantin Vavilov	Irina Natarova	Konstantin Vavilov; Evgenij Blitshteyn	Nina Kosyak; Tatyana Novikova	Konstantin Vavilov; Tatyana Kochetkova
1967	Konstantin Vavilov	Irina Natarova	Konstantin Vavilov; Nikolay Nikitin	Nina Kosyak; Tatyana Novikova	Konstantin Vavilov; Tatyana Kochetkova
1968	Konstantin Vavilov	Tatyana Novikova	Konstantin Vavilov; Nikolay Nikitin	Nina Kosyak; Ljudmila Markova	Viktor Shvachko; Irina Natarova
1969	Viktor Shvachko	Irina Natarova	Konstantin Vavilov; Nikolay Nikitin	Tatyana Kochetkova; T. Shmakova	Viktor Shvachko; Irina Natarova
1970	Viktor Shvachko	Irina Natarova	Konstantin Vavilov; Nikolay Peshekhonov	Irina Natarova; Gundega Grīnuma	Viktor Shvachko; Irina Natarova
1971	Viktor Shvachko	Irina Shevchenko	Konstantin Vavilov; Nikolay Peshekhonov	Irina Shevchenko; Nina Kosyak	Viktor Shvachko; Irina Shevchenko
1972	Semyon Rozin	Tatyana Kochetkova	Konstantin Vavilov; Nikolay Peshekhonov	Tatyana Kochetkova; T. Andropova	Nikolay Peshekhonov; T. Andropova
1973	Semyon Rozin	Irina Shevchenko	Konstantin Vavilov; Nikolay Peshekhonov	Ljudmila Markova; Reet Valgmaa	Konstantin Vavilov; Nataliya Damaskina
1974	Konstantin Vavilov	Ljudmila Markova	Konstantin Vavilov; Nikolay Peshekhonov	Ljudmila Markova; Reet Valgmaa	Konstantin Vavilov; Nataliya Damaskina
1975	Anatoliy Skripko	Nataliya Damaskina	Konstantin Vavilov; Nikolay Peshekhonov	Irina Shevchenko; Nadezhda Litvincheva	Nikolay Peshekhonov; Irina Shevchenko
1976	Konstantin Vavilov	Nadezhda Litvincheva	Konstantin Vavilov; Nikolay Peshekhonov	Irina Shevchenko; Nadezhda Litvincheva	Nikolay Peshekhonov; Irina Shevchenkoo
1977	Anatoliy Skripko	Alla Zvonareva	Viktor Shvachko; V. Nikiforov	Alla Prodan; Nadezhda Litvincheva	Viktor Shvachko; Nadezhda Litvincheva
1978	Anatoliy Skripko	Alla Prodan	Konstantin Vavilov; Nikolay Peshekhonov	Alla Prodan; Nadezhda Litvincheva	Viktor Shvachko; Nadezhda Litvincheva
1979	Vyacheslav Shukin	Alla Prodan	Konstantin Vavilov; Nikolay Peshekhonov	Alla Prodan; Nadezhda Litvincheva	Anatoliy Skripko; Svetlana Belyasova
1980	Anatoliy Skripko	Svetlana Belyasova	Konstantin Vavilov; Nikolay Peshekhonov	Svetlana Belyasova; N. Maksarova	Viktor Shvachko; Nadezhda Litvincheva
1981	Anatoliy Skripko	Svetlana Belyasova	Leonid Pajkin; Viktor Samarin	Svetlana Belyasova; Vard Potosyan	Viktor Shvachko; Nadezhda Litvincheva
1982	Anatoliy Skripko	Tatyana Litvinenko	Konstantin Vavilov; Nikolay Peshekhonov	Alla Prodan; Nadezhda Litvincheva	Viktor Shvachko; Nadezhda Litvincheva
1983	Vitaliy Shmakov	Tatyana Litvinenko	Radiy Bilalov; Viktor Samarin	Svetlana Belyasova; Ljudmila Suslo	Vitaliy Shmakov; Svetlana Belyasova
1984	Vitaliy Shmakov	Svetlana Belyasova	Vitaliy Shmakov; Anatoliy Skripko	Svetlana Belyasova; Vlada Beljutina	Vitaliy Shmakov; Svetlana Belyasova
1985	Vitaliy Shmakov	Tatyana Litvinenko	Andrey Antropov; Sergey Sevryukov	Tatyana Litvinenko; Viktoria Pron	Andrey Antropov; Viktoria Pron
1986	Andrey Antropov	Irina Rozhkova	Andrey Antropov; Sergey Sevryukov	Tatyana Litvinenko; Elena Rybkina	Andrey Antropov; Svetlana Belyasova
1987	Andrey Antropov	Vlada Beljutina	Andrey Antropov; Sergey Sevryukov	Svetlana Belyasova; Elena Rybkina	Andrey Antropov; Viktoria Pron
1988	Andrey Antropov	Elena Rybkina	Andrey Antropov; Sergey Sevryukov	Viktoria Pron; Tatyana Litvinenko	Vitaly Shmakov; Viktoria Pron
1989	Andrey Antropov	Elena Rybkina	Andrey Antropov; Nikolay Zuev	Elena Rybkina; Vlada Chernyavskaya	Andrey Antropov; Elena Rybkina
1990	Nikolay Zuev	Elena Rybkina	Andrey Antropov; Nikolay Zuev	Elena Rybkina; Vlada Chernyavskaya	Vitaly Shmakov; Vlada Chernyavskaya
1991	Andrey Antropov	Elena Rybkina	Andrey Antropov; Pavel Uvarov	Elena Rybkina; Tatyana Khokhlova	Vladimir Smolin; Tatyana Arefyeva
