= Victoria Evtoushenko =

Ukrainian badminton player

Personal information
- Born: Victoria Viktorovna Pron; 23 April 1965 (age 61) Dnipropetrovsk, Ukrainian SSR, Soviet Union
- Height: 1.65 m (5 ft 5 in)
- Weight: 56 kg (123 lb)

Sport
- Country: Ukraine
- Sport: Badminton
- Handedness: Right
- Event: Women's & mixed doubles

Women's & mixed doubles
- BWF profile

Victoria Viktorovna Evtoushenko (Ukrainian: Вікторія Вікторівна Євтушенко; born 23 April 1965 as Victoria Viktorovna Pron) is a Ukrainian badminton player. Evtoushenko had won seventeen times Ukrainian National Championships from 1992 to 2000. She also won five titles at the Soviet National Championships before Ukraine declare the Independence. She competed at the 1996 and 2000 Summer Olympics. Evtoushenko played in the women's and mixed doubles event at the Olympic Games, finished in 17 position in the women's doubles event in 1996 and 2000 partnered with Elena Nozdran, and in the mixed doubles event, she finished 33 in 1996 and 17 in 2000 partnered with Vladislav Druzchenko.

== Achievements ==
=== IBF World Grand Prix ===
The World Badminton Grand Prix has been sanctioned by the International Badminton Federation from 1983 to 2006.

Women's doubles
| Year | Tournament | Partner | Opponent | Score | Result |
|---|---|---|---|---|---|
| 1994 | Russian Open | (Ukraine) Elena Nozdran | (Russia) Svetlana Alferova (Russia) Marina Yakusheva | 1–15, 7–15 | (silver) Runner-up |
| 1999 | Polish Open | (Ukraine) Elena Nozdran | (Malaysia) Ang Li Peng (Malaysia) Chor Hooi Yee | 15–2, 13–15, 10–15 | (silver) Runner-up |

Mixed doubles
| Year | Tournament | Partner | Opponent | Score | Result |
|---|---|---|---|---|---|
| 1994 | Russian Open | (Ukraine) Vladislav Druzchenko | (China) Liu Yong (China) Li Qi | 12–15, 13–18 | (silver) Runner-up |
| 1995 | Bulgarian Open | (Ukraine) Vladislav Druzchenko | (Belarus) Vitali Shmakov (Belarus) Vlada Chernyavskaya | 17–15, 15–7 | (gold) Winner |
| 2000 | Polish Open | (Ukraine) Vladislav Druzchenko | (China) Chen Qiqiu (China) Chen Lin | 7–15, 8–15 | (silver) Runner-up |

=== IBF International ===
Women's singles
| Year | Tournament | Opponent | Score | Result |
|---|---|---|---|---|
| 1985 | King Mahendra Memorial | (Hong Kong) Amy Chan | 10–3, 6–11, 8–11 | (silver) Runner-up |
| 1989 | Czechoslovakian International | (East Germany) Monika Cassens | 11–2, 11–3 | (gold) Winner |
| 1991 | Austrian International | (Soviet Union) Elena Rybkina | 8–11, 1–11 | (silver) Runner-up |

Women's doubles
| Year | Tournament | Partner | Opponent | Score | Result |
|---|---|---|---|---|---|
| 1984 | Czechoslovakian International | (Soviet Union) Tatyana Litvinenko | (Denmark) Charlotte Hattens (Denmark) Lisbet Stuer-Lauridsen | 12–15, 15–13, 15–12 | (gold) Winner |
| 1984 | USSR International | (Soviet Union) Tatyana Litvinenko | (Denmark) Jeanette Jensen (Denmark) Lotte Olsen | 15–9, 15–9 | (gold) Winner |
| 1985 | King Mahendra Memorial | (Soviet Union) Vlada Beljutina | (Soviet Union) Svetlana Belyasova (Soviet Union) Elena Rybkina | 10–15, 4–15 | (silver) Runner-up |
| 1985 | USSR International | (Soviet Union) Tatyana Litvinenko | (Soviet Union) Svetlana Belyasova (Soviet Union) Elena Rybkina | 8–15, 15–9, 5–15 | (silver) Runner-up |
| 1986 | USSR International | (Soviet Union) Tatyana Litvinenko | (Soviet Union) Svetlana Belyasova (Soviet Union) Irina Rozhkova | 15–5, 13–18, 15–12 | (gold) Winner |
| 1989 | Czechoslovakian International | (Soviet Union) Tatyana Litvinenko | (East Germany) Monika Cassens (East Germany) Petra Michalowsky | 15–10, 15–12 | (gold) Winner |
| 1990 | Austrian International | (Soviet Union) Irina Serova | (Soviet Union) Vlada Chernyavskaya (Soviet Union) Elena Rybkina | 15–9, 7–15, 9–15 | (silver) Runner-up |
| 1994 | Slovak International | (Ukraine) Elena Nozdran | (Russia) Svetlana Alferova (Russia) Elena Denisova | 15–1, 15–3 | (gold) Winner |
| 1994 | Bulgarian International | (Ukraine) Elena Nozdran | (Czech Republic) Markéta Koudelková (Czech Republic) Eva Lacinová | 15–11, 15–7 | (gold) Winner |
| 1995 | Slovak International | (Ukraine) Elena Nozdran | (Kazakhstan) Ludmila Okuneva (Kazakhstan) Olesia Sholar | 15–2, 17–15 | (gold) Winner |
| 1997 | Le Volant d'Or de Toulouse | (Ukraine) Elena Nozdran | (France) Armelle Cassen (France) Tatiana Vattier | 15–3, 15–7 | (gold) Winner |
| 1998 | Le Volant d'Or de Toulouse | (Ukraine) Elena Nozdran | (Switzerland) Judith Baumeyer (Switzerland) Santi Wibowo | 15–4, 12–15, 15–6 | (gold) Winner |

Mixed doubles
| Year | Tournament | Partner | Opponent | Score | Result |
|---|---|---|---|---|---|
| 1986 | USSR International | (Soviet Union) Andrey Antropov | (Denmark) Peter Buch (Denmark) Grete Mogensen | 2–15, 15–12, 15–8 | (gold) Winner |
| 1987 | Polish International | (Soviet Union) Andrey Antropov | (Soviet Union) Sergey Sevryukov (Soviet Union) Irina Rozhkova | 15–10, 15–10 | (gold) Winner |
| 1988 | USSR International | (Soviet Union) Vitaliy Shmakov | (Sweden) Peter Axelsson (Sweden) Charlotta Wihlborg | 15–10, 18–15 | (gold) Winner |
| 1989 | Czechoslovakian International | (Soviet Union) Alexej Chumakov | (East Germany) Thomas Mundt (East Germany) Petra Michalowsky | 6–15, 1–15 | (silver) Runner-up |
| 1989 | USSR International | (Soviet Union) Nikolay Zuyev | (Soviet Union) Vitaliy Shmakov (Soviet Union) Vlada Chernyavskaya | 9–15, 8–15 | (silver) Runner-up |
| 1990 | USSR International | (Soviet Union) Vitaliy Shmakov | (Soviet Union) Mikhail Korshuk (Soviet Union) Vlada Chernyavskaya | 14–17, 6–15 | (silver) Runner-up |
| 1991 | Austrian International | (Soviet Union) Igor Dmitriev | (Poland) Jerzy Dołhan (Poland) Bożena Haracz | 15–8, 10–15, 9–15 | (silver) Runner-up |
| 1994 | Slovak International | (Ukraine) Vladislav Druzchenko | (Russia) Artur Khachaturyan (Russia) Svetlana Alferova | 5–15, 15–7, 15–9 | (gold) Winner |
| 1994 | Bulgarian International | (Ukraine) Vladislav Druzchenko | (Ukraine) Konstantin Tatranov (Ukraine) Irina Koloskova | 15–3, 15–8 | (gold) Winner |
| 1995 | Slovak International | (Ukraine) Vladislav Druzchenko | (Ukraine) Valeriy Streltsov (Ukraine) Natalja Esipenko | 17–15, 15–5 | (gold) Winner |
| 1996 | Austrian International | (Ukraine) Vladislav Druzchenko | (Netherlands) Quinten van Dalm (Netherlands) Nicole van Hooren | 15–4, 15–8 | (gold) Winner |
| 1996 | French International | (Ukraine) Vladislav Druzchenko | (Denmark) Jesper Larsen (Denmark) Majken Vange | 8–15, 17–14, 11–15 | (silver) Runner-up |
| 1997 | Le Volant d'Or de Toulouse | (Ukraine) Konstantin Tatranov | (Ukraine) Valeriy Streltsov (Ukraine) Elena Nozdran | 15–8, 9–15, 6–3 retired | (silver) Runner-up |
| 1998 | Le Volant d'Or de Toulouse | (Ukraine) Vladislav Druzchenko | (Germany) Michael Keck (Germany) Nicol Pitro | 12–15, 10–15 | (silver) Runner-up |
| 1999 | Le Volant d'Or de Toulouse | (Ukraine) Vladislav Druzchenko | (Germany) Michael Keck (Germany) Nicol Pitro | 6–15, 9–15 | (silver) Runner-up |
