= Austrian International =

Badminton competition

The Austrian International or Austrian Open in badminton is an international open held in Austria since 1965. In the initial years they took place later annually every two years, but since 1973 it has been held annually.

== Previous winners ==
Year	Men's singles	Women's singles	Men's doubles	Women's doubles	Mixed doubles	Ref
1964	(West Germany) Franz Beinvogl	(West Germany) Heidi Menacher	(England) Roger Mills (England) Mike Rawlings	(West Germany) Heidi Menacher (West Germany) Edeltraud Hefter	(West Germany) Rupert Liebl (West Germany) Heidi Menacher	
1966	(Denmark) Tom Bacher	(East Germany) Ruth Preuß	(West Germany) Franz Beinvogl (West Germany) Siegfried Betz	(Austria) Brigitte Hlinka (Austria) Lore Voit	(West Germany) Siegfried Betz (West Germany) Anke Witten	
1968	(West Germany) Siegfried Betz	(Socialist Federal Republic of Yugoslavia) Lucka Krizman	(Denmark) Tom Bacher (Denmark) Poul Petersen	(Denmark) Anne Berglund (Denmark) Bente Jeppensen	(Denmark) Tom Bacher (Denmark) Bente Jeppensen	
1970	(Austria) Hermann Fröhlich	(East Germany) Monika Thiere	(West Germany) Franz Beinvogl (West Germany) Siegfried Betz	(Austria) Ingrid Wieltschnig (Austria) Elisabeth Wieltschnig	(West Germany) Siegfried Betz (West Germany) Anke Betz	
1972	(Denmark) Poul Petersen	(Czech Republic) Alena Poboraková	(Denmark) Tom Bacher (Denmark) Poul Petersen	(Austria) Britta Kirchhofer (Austria) Elisabeth Wieltschnig	(Austria) Hermann Fröhlich (Austria) Lore König	
1973	(Socialist Federal Republic of Yugoslavia) Gregor Berden	(Socialist Federal Republic of Yugoslavia) Vita Bohinc	(Socialist Federal Republic of Yugoslavia) Gregor Berden (Socialist Federal Republic of Yugoslavia) Stane Koprivsek	(Socialist Federal Republic of Yugoslavia) Vita Bohinc (Socialist Federal Republic of Yugoslavia) Lucka Krizman	(Austria) Hermann Fröhlich (Austria) Lore König	
1974	(Socialist Federal Republic of Yugoslavia) Gregor Berden	(Czech Republic) Alena Poboraková	(West Germany) Franz Beinvogl (West Germany) Siegfried Betz	(West Germany) Anke Betz (West Germany) K. Kistler	(Austria) Hermann Fröhlich (Austria) Lore König	
1975	(Austria) Reinhold Pum	(Czech Republic) Alena Poboraková	(Socialist Federal Republic of Yugoslavia) Gregor Berden (Socialist Federal Republic of Yugoslavia) Stane Koprivsek	(West Germany) Anke Betz (West Germany) Christa Feser	(Austria) Reinhold Pum (Austria) Lore König	
1976	(Austria) Hermann Fröhlich	(Czech Republic) Tatjana Pravdová	(West Germany) Franz Beinvogl (West Germany) Franz Swoboda	(West Germany) Jutta Vogel (West Germany) Elke Weber	(Czech Republic) Konstantin Holobradý (Czech Republic) Tatjana Pravdová	
1977- 1978	No competition					
1979	(West Germany) Ulrich Rost	(Netherlands) Hanke de Kort	(West Germany) Ulrich Rost (West Germany) Bernd Wessels	(Netherlands) Hanke de Kort (Netherlands) Karin Duyvestijn	(West Germany) Bernd Wessels (West Germany) Ingrid Morsch	
1980	(West Germany) Helmut Streit	(West Germany) Gudrun Ziebold	(West Germany) Harald Klauer (West Germany) Hans Werner Niesner	(Poland) Bozena Wojtkowska (Poland) Maria Bahryj	(Austria) Ernst Stingl (Austria) Renate Dietrich	
1981	(China) Chen Changjie	(China) Chen Ruizhen	(Soviet Union) Viktor Samarin (Soviet Union) Leonid Paikin	(Poland) Bozena Wojtkowska (Poland) Ewa Rusznica	(China) Chen Changjie (China) Chen Ruizhen	
1982	(West Germany) Harald Klauer	(Wales) Angela Nelson	(Netherlands) Ivan Kristanto (Netherlands) Frank van Dongen	(Soviet Union) Alla Prodan (Soviet Union) Nadezhda Litvintscheva	(Soviet Union) Viktor Shvatschko (Soviet Union) Nadezhda Litvintscheva	
1983	(India) Syed Modi	(Chinese Taipei) Sherry Liu	(India) Partho Ganguli (India) Leroy D'Sa	(Canada) Linda Cloutier (Canada) Denyse Julien	(New Zealand) Grame Robson (New Zealand) Toni Wittaker	
1984	(India) Syed Modi	(Sweden) Lena Staxler	(Soviet Union) Vitaliy Shmakov (Soviet Union) Vyacheslav Shukin	(West Germany) Heidemarie Krickhaus (West Germany) Cathrin Hoppe	(Soviet Union) Vitaliy Shmakov (Soviet Union) Ljubov Fedotova	
1985	No competition					
1986	(Denmark) Kim Brodersen	(Bulgaria) Diana Koleva	(Denmark) Claus Thomsen (Denmark) Henrik Svarrer	(Netherlands) Paula Kloet (Soviet Union) Nataliya Zhavoronkova	(Soviet Union) Andrey Antropov (Soviet Union) Irina Rozhkova	
1987	(Denmark) Ib Frederiksen	(Netherlands) Astrid van der Knaap	(Netherlands) Pierre Pelupessy (Netherlands) Alex Meijer	(Netherlands) Monique Hoogland (Netherlands) Erica van Dijck	(Netherlands) Alex Meijer (Netherlands) Erica van Dijck	
1988	(Denmark) Claus Thomsen	(Poland) Bozena Siemieniec	(West Germany) Stephan Kuhl (West Germany) Robert Neumann	(Poland) Bozena Haracz (Poland) Bozena Siemieniec	(Poland) Jerzy Dolhan (Poland) Bozena Haracz	
1989	(Soviet Union) Andrey Antropov	(Soviet Union) Elena Rybkina	(West Germany) Ralf Rausch (West Germany) Volker Eiber	(Denmark) Charlote Madsen (Denmark) Anne Mette Bille	(Soviet Union) Andrey Antropov (Soviet Union) Elena Rybkina	
1990	(Soviet Union) Andrey Antropov	(Soviet Union) Elena Rybkina	(England) David Wright (England) Nick Ponting	(Soviet Union) Elena Rybkina (Soviet Union) Vlada Cherniavskaya	(Denmark) Christian Jacobsen (Denmark) Marlene Thomsen	
1991	(Sweden) Rikkard Magnussen	(Soviet Union) Elena Rybkina	(Germany) Michael Keck (Germany) Robert Neumann	(Soviet Union) Elena Rybkina (Soviet Union) Vlada Cherniavskaya	(Poland) Jerzy Dolhan (Poland) Bozena Haracz	
1992	(Commonwealth of Independent States) Andrey Antropov	(England) Jo Muggeridge	(England) Andy Goode (England) Chris Hunt	(Commonwealth of Independent States) Natalia Ivanova (Commonwealth of Independent States) Julia Martynenko	(England) Simon Archer (Denmark) Maria Rasmussen	
1993	(Netherlands) Chris Bruil	(Austria) Irina Serova	(England) Simon Archer (England) Nick Ponting	(Denmark) Anne Sondergaard (Denmark) Lotte Thomsen	(England) Nick Ponting (England) Joanne Wright	
1994	(Sweden) Rickard Magnusson	(Sweden) Margit Borg	(Russia) Andrey Antropov (Russia) Nikolai Zuyev	(Chinese Taipei) Shyu Yu-Ling (Chinese Taipei) Lee Ming-Hwa	(Russia) Nikolai Zuyev (Russia) Nadezhda Chervyakova	
1995	(Denmark) Henrik Bengtsson	(Chinese Taipei) Shyu Yuh-Ling	(Denmark) Janek Roos (Denmark) Allan Borch	(Chinese Taipei) Chen Li-Chin (Chinese Taipei) Tsai Hui-Min	(Germany) Björn Siegemund (Germany) Katrin Schmidt	
1996	(Denmark) Kenneth Jonassen	(Denmark) Mette Pedersen	(Denmark) Jesper Larsen (Denmark) Peder Nissen	(Denmark) Majken Vange (Denmark) Pernille Harder	(Ukraine) Vladislav Druzchenko (Ukraine) Viktoria Evtushenko	
1997	(Netherlands) Chris Bruil	(Netherlands) Judith Meulendijks	(England) Anthony Clark (England) Ian Pearson	(Germany) Karen Stechmann (Germany) Nicol Pitro	(Germany) Michael Keck (Germany) Karen Stechmann	
1998	(Austria) Jürgen Koch	(Netherlands) Carolien Glebbeek	(Scotland) Craig Robertson (Scotland) Alastair Gatt	(Scotland) Elinor Middlemiss (Scotland) Sandra Watt	(Scotland) Kenny Middlemiss (Scotland) Elinor Middlemiss	
1999	(Denmark) Niels Christian Kaldau	(Russia) Ella Karachkova	(Bulgaria) Svetoslav Stoyanov (Bulgaria) Mihail Popov	(Scotland) Kirsteen McEwan (Scotland) Sandra Watt	(Scotland) Kenny Middlemiss (Scotland) Kirsteen McEwan	
2000	(Denmark) Kasper Ødum	(Russia) Marina Yakusheva	(Denmark) Joachim Fischer Nielsen (Denmark) Janek Roos	(England) Rebecca Pantaney (England) Joanne Wright	(Sweden) Ola Molin (Sweden) Johanna Persson	
2001	(Denmark) Kenneth Jonassen	(England) Tracey Hallam	(Poland) Michał Łogosz (Poland) Robert Mateusiak	(Russia) Ella Karachkova (Russia) Anastasia Russkikh	(Denmark) Mathias Boe (Denmark) Britta Andersen	
2002	(Finland) Ilkka Nyquist	(Sweden) Sara Persson	(England) James Anderson (England) Robert Blair	(Denmark) Helle Nielsen (Denmark) Lene Mørk	(Netherlands) Dennis Lens (Sweden) Johanna Persson	
2003	(Poland) Przemysław Wacha	(Germany) Xu Huaiwen	(Poland) Michał Łogosz (Poland) Robert Mateusiak	(Russia) Ekaterina Ananina (Russia) Irina Ruslajkova	(England) Simon Archer (England) Donna Kellogg	
2004	(Poland) Przemysław Wacha	(Chinese Taipei) Cheng Shao-chieh	(Chinese Taipei) Lee Sung-Yuan (Chinese Taipei) Lin Wei-Hsiang	(Bulgaria) Petya Nedelcheva (Bulgaria) Neli Boteva	(Denmark) Jesper Thomsen (Denmark) Britta Andersen	
2005	No competition					
2006	(Denmark) Joachim Persson	(Germany) Juliane Schenk	(Austria) Jürgen Koch (Austria) Peter Zauner	(Switzerland) Cynthia Tuwankotta (Indonesia) Atu Rosalina	(Germany) Ingo Kindervater (Germany) Kathrin Piotrowski	
2007	(China) Lü Yi	(China) Zhu Jingjing	(China) Guo Zhendong (China) He Hanbin	(China) Cheng Shu (China) Zhao Yunlei	(Russia) Vitali Durkin (Russia) Valeria Sorokina	
2008	(India) Anand Pawar	(China) Zhang Xi	(Indonesia) Fran Kurniawan (Indonesia) Rendra Wijaya	(China) Cai Jiani (China) Yu Qi	(China) Zhang Yi (China) Cai Jiani	
2009	(Japan) Kazuteru Kozai	(Germany) Juliane Schenk	(Japan) Naoki Kawamae (Japan) Shoji Sato	(Japan) Shizuka Matsuo (Japan) Mami Naito	(England) Robert Adcock (England) Heather Olver	
2010	(Indonesia) Andre Kurniawan Tedjono	(Indonesia) Fransisca Ratnasari	(Indonesia) Viki Indra Okvana (Indonesia) Ardiansyah Putra	(Japan) Rie Eto (Japan) Yu Wakita	(Ukraine) Valeriy Atrashchenkov (Ukraine) Elena Prus	
2011	(Chinese Taipei) Hsu Jen-hao	(Japan) Nozomi Okuhara	(England) Anthony Clark (England) Chris Langridge	(Japan) Yuriko Miki (Japan) Koharu Yonemoto	(Hong Kong) Wong Wai Hong (Hong Kong) Chau Hoi Wah	
2012	(Poland) Przemysław Wacha	(Japan) Sayaka Takahashi	(India) Rupesh Kumar K. T. (India) Sanave Thomas	(Malaysia) Ng Hui Ern (Malaysia) Ng Hui Lin	(Hong Kong) Wong Wai Hong (Hong Kong) Chau Hoi Wah	
2013	(Japan) Kento Momota	(Japan) Yui Hashimoto	(Japan) Hiroyuki Saeki (Japan) Ryota Taohata	(Japan) Misato Aratama (Japan) Megumi Taruno	(Hong Kong) Chan Yun Lung (Hong Kong) Tse Ying Suet	
2014	(India) Sourabh Varma	(Chinese Taipei) Pai Hsiao-ma	(Chinese Taipei) Chen Hung-ling (Chinese Taipei) Lu Chia-bin	(Bulgaria) Gabriela Stoeva (Bulgaria) Stefani Stoeva	(Poland) Robert Mateusiak (Poland) Agnieszka Wojtkowska	
2015	(Hong Kong) Ng Ka Long	(Hong Kong) Cheung Ngan Yi	(Indonesia) Fajar Alfian (Indonesia) Muhammad Rian Ardianto	(Indonesia) Suci Rizky Andini (Indonesia) Maretha Dea Giovani	(Indonesia) Edi Subaktiar (Indonesia) Gloria Emanuelle Widjaja	
2016	(Denmark) Anders Antonsen	(China) Xu Wei	(England) Marcus Ellis (England) Chris Langridge	(Russia) Ekaterina Bolotova (Russia) Evgeniya Kosetskaya	(Denmark) Mathias Christiansen (Denmark) Lena Grebak	
2017	(Japan) Kanta Tsuneyama	(Scotland) Kirsty Gilmour	(Japan) Takuto Inoue (Japan) Yuki Kaneko	(Japan) Rira Kawashima (Japan) Saori Ozaki	(Denmark) Mikkel Mikkelsen (Denmark) Mai Surrow	
2018	(India) Parupalli Kashyap	(Denmark) Anna Thea Madsen	(Chinese Taipei) Lu Chen (Chinese Taipei) Ye Hong-wei	(Japan) Chisato Hoshi (Japan) Kie Nakanishi	(Russia) Evgenij Dremin (Russia) Evgenia Dimova	
2019	(Netherlands) Mark Caljouw	(China) Wang Zhiyi	(China) Guo Xinwa (China) Liu Shiwen	(China) Liu Xuanxuan (China) Xia Yuting	(Netherlands) Robin Tabeling (Netherlands) Selena Piek	
2020	(Germany) Max Weißkirchen	(Japan) Yukino Nakai	(Scotland) Alexander Dunn (Scotland) Adam Hall	(Japan) Tsukiko Yasaki (Japan) Erika Yokoyama	(Denmark) Jeppe Bay (Denmark) Sara Lundgaard	
2021	Cancelled (Note: This tournament, originally to be played from 24–27 February, was later cancelled due to COVID-19 pandemic in Austria.)					
2021	(Indonesia) Panji Ahmad Maulana	(Spain) Clara Azurmendi	(Malaysia) Junaidi Arif (Malaysia) Muhammad Haikal	(Indonesia) Ni Ketut Mahadewi Istarani (Indonesia) Serena Kani	(Malaysia) Choong Hon Jian (Malaysia) Toh Ee Wei	
2022	(Malaysia) Yeoh Seng Zoe	(Chinese Taipei) Hsu Wen-chi	(Chinese Taipei) Lin Yu-chieh (Chinese Taipei) Su Li-wei	(Chinese Taipei) Lee Chia-hsin (Chinese Taipei) Teng Chun-hsun	(Chinese Taipei) Ye Hong-wei (Chinese Taipei) Lee Chia-hsin	
2023	(Belgium) Julien Carraggi	(Chinese Taipei) Wang Yu-si	(Malaysia) Low Hang Yee (Malaysia) Ng Eng Cheong	(Chinese Taipei) Liu Chiao-yun (Chinese Taipei) Wang Yu-qiao	(England) Ethan van Leeuwen (England) Annie Lado	
2024	(Indonesia) Prahdiska Bagas Shujiwo	(Indonesia) Deswanti Hujansih Nurtertiati	(Indonesia) Daniel Edgar Marvino (Indonesia) Christopher David Wijaya	(Indonesia) Thesya Munggaran (Indonesia) Az Zahra Ditya Ramadhani	(Indonesia) Marwan Faza (Indonesia) Felisha Pasaribu	
2025	(Denmark) Magnus Johannesen	(Denmark) Amalie Schulz	(Singapore) Donovan Wee (Singapore) Howin Wong	(France) Elsa Jacob (France) Anne Tran	(Spain) Rubén García (Spain) Lucía Rodríguez	
2026	(Chinese Taipei) Yang Chieh-dan	(Canada) Rachel Chan	(Germany) Malik Bourakkadi (Germany) Kenneth Neumann	(Chinese Taipei) Hsieh Chih-ying (Chinese Taipei) Lee Yu-hsuan	(Germany) Jan Colin Völker (Germany) Emma Moszczynski	

== Performances by nation ==
As of the 2026 edition

Top Nations
Pos	Nation	MS	WS	MD	WD	XD	Total
1	Germany	6	5	10	6	8	35
2	Denmark	13	3	6	5	7.5	34.5
3	Chinese Taipei	2	6	4	5	1	18
4	Japan	3	4	3	7		17
5	England		2	8	1	4.5	15.5
6	Indonesia	3	2	4	3.5	2	14.5
6	Soviet Union	2	3	2	3.5	4	14.5
8	Austria	4	1	1	3	5	14
8	China	2	5	2	3	2	14
8	Netherlands	3	4	2	2.5	2.5	14
11	Poland	3	1	2	3	3	12
12	Russia		2	1	3	3	9
13	India	5		2			7
13	Scotland		1	2	2	2	7
13	Yugoslavia	2	2	2	1		7
16	Sweden	2	3			1.5	6.5
17	Czech Republic		4			1	5
17	Hong Kong	1	1			3	5
17	Malaysia	1		2	1	1	5
20	Bulgaria		1	1	2		4
21	Canada		1		1		2
21	CIS	1			1		2
21	East Germany		2				2
21	Spain		1			1	2
21	Ukraine					2	2
26	Belgium	1					1
26	Finland	1					1
26	France				1		1
26	New Zealand					1	1
26	Singapore			1			1
26	Wales		1				1
32	Switzerland				0.5		0.5
Total		55	55	55	55	55	275
