= Bulgarian Open (badminton) =

Badminton championship

The Bulgarian Open Championship is an annual international badminton championships held in Bulgaria since 1985, by then known as Bulgarian International. It was halted between 1996 and 1998, and in 2000. The tournament belongs to the Badminton Europe elite circuit and become the highest level badminton tournament in Bulgaria. It changed to its current name in 2017, to differentiate it from the second badminton tournament in the country which is now known as Bulgarian International Championship.

== Previous winners ==
Year	Men's singles	Women's singles	Men's doubles	Women's doubles	Mixed doubles
1985	(Austria) Heinz Fischer	(East Germany) Monika Cassens	(Austria) Heinz Fischer (Bulgaria) Jeliazko Valkov	(East Germany) Monika Cassens (East Germany) Kerstin Bohn	(East Germany) Thomas Mundt (East Germany) Monika Cassens
1986	(Austria) Heinz Fischer	(Denmark) Helle Andersen	(Denmark) Thomas Lund (Denmark) Max Gandrup	(Denmark) Susanne Pedersen (Denmark) Tanja Berg	(East Germany) Thomas Mundt (East Germany) Monika Cassens
1987	(Poland) Jacek Hankiewicz	(East Germany) Monika Cassens	(Denmark) Peter Buch Jensen (Denmark) Karsten Wolfgang	(East Germany) Monika Cassens (East Germany) Angela Michalowski	(East Germany) Kai Abraham (East Germany) Petra Michalowsky
1988	(China) Jin Feng	(China) Lin Yanfen	(China) Lin Jian (China) Fu Qiang	(China) Lin Yanfen (China) Zhang Wanling	(China) Li Jian (China) Gao Meifeng
1989	(China) Liang Zhiofang	(China) Lin Yanfen	(China) Yu Lizhi (China) Zheng Shouta	(China) Lin Yanfen (China) Zhang Wanling	(China) Chi Bing (China) Lin Yanfen
1990	(Soviet Union) Andrey Antropov	(Soviet Union) Irina Serova	(Soviet Union) Andrey Antropov (Soviet Union) Nikolai Zuyev	(Bulgaria) Diana Koleva (Denmark) Hellene Kirkegaard	(Soviet Union) Nikolai Zuyev (Soviet Union) Irina Serova
1991	(Finland) Robert Liljequist	(Soviet Union) Irina Serova	(Germany) Markus Keck (Germany) Michael Helber	(Germany) Andrea Findhammer (Germany) Anne-Katrin Seid	(Germany) Markus Keck (Germany) Anne-Katrin Seid
1992	(Commonwealth of Independent States) Anatoliy Skripko	(Bulgaria) Victoria Hristova	(Bulgaria) Svetoslav Stoyanov (Bulgaria) Mihail Popov	(Bulgaria) Neli Nedyalkova (Bulgaria) Reni Asenova	(Bulgaria) Svetoslav Stoyanov (Bulgaria) Raina Tzvetkova
1993	(Austria) Hannes Fuchs	(Austria) Irina Serova	(Belarus) Mikhail Korschuk (Belarus) Vitaliy Shmakov	(Belarus) Tatiana Gerasimovitch (Belarus) Vlada Chernyavskaya	(Belarus) Vitaliy Shmakov (Belarus) Vlada Chernyavskaya
1994	(Austria) Hannes Fuchs	(Poland) Katarzyna Krasowska	(Poland) Robert Mateusiak (Poland) Damian Pławecki	(Ukraine) Elena Nozdran (Ukraine) Victoria Evtoushenko	(Ukraine) Vladislav Druzchenko (Ukraine) Victoria Evtoushenko
1995	(England) Anders Nielsen	(Ukraine) Elena Nozdran	(United States) Thomas Reidy (United States) Kevin Han	(Bulgaria) Diana Koleva (Bulgaria) Neli Nedyalkova	(Ukraine) Vladislav Druzchenko (Ukraine) Victoria Evtoushenko
1996–1998	Not held				
1999	(Denmark) Kasper Ødum	(Ukraine) Elena Nozdran	(Germany) Joachim Tesche (Germany) Christian Mohr	(Bulgaria) Diana Koleva (Bulgaria) Neli Nedyalkova	(Ukraine) Valerij Streltsov (Ukraine) Natalia Golovkina
2000	Not held				
2001	(Wales) Richard Vaughan	(Bulgaria) Petya Nedelcheva	(England) Peter Jeffrey (England) Ian Palenthorpe	(England) Liza Parker (England) Suzanne Rayappan	(Scotland) Robert Blair (England) Natalie Munt
2002	(Russia) Stanislav Pukhov	(Russia) Elena Suchareva	(Russia) Stanislav Pukhov (Russia) Nikolai Zuyev	(Russia) Natalia Gorodnicheva (Russia) Marina Yakusheva	(Russia) Nikolai Zuyev (Russia) Marina Yakusheva
2003	(Japan) Shoji Sato	(Bulgaria) Petya Nedelcheva	(Denmark) Thomas Røjkjær Jensen (Denmark) Tommy Sørensen	(Bulgaria) Petya Nedelcheva (Bulgaria) Neli Boteva	(Ukraine) Dimitry Miznikov (Ukraine) Natalia Golovkina
2004	(England) Nathan Rice	(England) Elizabeth Cann	(Indonesia) Ruben Gordown Khosadalina (Indonesia) Aji Basuki Sindoro	(Iceland) Ragna Ingólfsdóttir (Iceland) Sara Jónsdóttir	(England) Steve Foster (England) Jenny Wallwork
2005	(Denmark) Joachim Fischer Nielsen	(Bulgaria) Petya Nedelcheva	(France) Mihail Popov (France) Svetoslav Stoyanov	(Bulgaria) Petya Nedelcheva (Bulgaria) Diana Dimova	(Bulgaria) Vladimir Metodiev (Bulgaria) Petya Nedelcheva
2006	(Russia) Sergei Ivlev	(Bulgaria) Linda Zetchiri	(Denmark) Rasmus Mangor Andersen (Denmark) Peter Steffensen	(Bulgaria) Petya Nedelcheva (Bulgaria) Diana Dimova	(Germany) Tim Dettmann (Germany) Annekatrin Lillie
2007	(Czech Republic) Jan Fröhlich	(Bulgaria) Petya Nedelcheva	(Poland) Robert Mateusiak (Poland) Michał Łogosz	(Russia) Valeria Sorokina (Russia) Nina Vislova	(Russia) Aleksandr Nikolaenko (Russia) Nina Vislova
2008	(Japan) Yuichi Ikeda	(Bulgaria) Petya Nedelcheva	(Russia) Vitalij Durkin (Russia) Aleksandr Nikolaenko	(Russia) Valeria Sorokina (Russia) Nina Vislova	(Russia) Aleksandr Nikolaenko (Russia) Nina Vislova
2009	(Denmark) Rune Ulsing	(Bulgaria) Petya Nedelcheva	(Denmark) Kasper Faust Henriksen (Denmark) Anders Kristiansen	(Bulgaria) Petya Nedelcheva (Russia) Anastasia Russkikh	(Poland) Robert Mateusiak (Poland) Nadieżda Kostiuczyk
2010	(Poland) Przemysław Wacha	(Bulgaria) Petya Nedelcheva	(England) Marcus Ellis (England) Peter Mills	(Bulgaria) Petya Nedelcheva (Russia) Anastasia Russkikh	(Russia) Evgeniy Dremin (Russia) Anastasia Russkikh
2011	(Poland) Przemysław Wacha	(Bulgaria) Linda Zetchiri	(Chinese Taipei) Liang Jui-wei (Chinese Taipei) Liao Kuan-hao	(England) Heather Olver (England) Mariana Agathangelou	(Ukraine) Valeriy Atrashchenkov (Ukraine) Anna Kobceva
2012 IC	(Lithuania) Kęstutis Navickas	(Bulgaria) Petya Nedelcheva	(Scotland) Robert Blair (Malaysia) Tan Bin Shen	(Bulgaria) Gabriela Stoeva (Bulgaria) Stefani Stoeva	(Germany) Michael Fuchs (Germany) Birgit Michels
2013 IC	(Denmark) Emil Holst	(Spain) Beatriz Corrales	(Poland) Łukasz Moreń (Poland) Wojciech Szkudlarczyk	(Bulgaria) Gabriela Stoeva (Bulgaria) Stefani Stoeva	(Scotland) Robert Blair (Scotland) Imogen Bankier
2014 IC	(Germany) Marc Zwiebler	(Spain) Beatriz Corrales	(Indonesia) Selvanus Geh (Indonesia) Kevin Sanjaya Sukamuljo	(Indonesia) Della Destiara Haris (Indonesia) Gebby Ristiyani Imawan	(Indonesia) Fran Kurniawan (Indonesia) Komala Dewi
2015 IC	(Spain) Pablo Abián	(Germany) Olga Konon	(Germany) Raphael Beck (Germany) Peter Käsbauer	(Bulgaria) Gabriela Stoeva (Bulgaria) Stefani Stoeva	(Poland) Robert Mateusiak (Poland) Nadieżda Zięba
2016 IS	(Denmark) Patrick Bjerregaard	(Spain) Clara Azurmendi	(Thailand) Pakin Kuna-anuvit (Thailand) Natthapat Trinkajee	(Turkey) Cemre Fere (Turkey) Neslihan Kılıç	(Russia) Rodion Alimov (Russia) Alina Davletova
2017 IS	(India) Lakshya Sen	(Turkey) Neslihan Yiğit	(Denmark) Mathias Thyrri (Denmark) Søren Toft Hansen	(Bulgaria) Gabriela Stoeva (Bulgaria) Stefani Stoeva	(Bulgaria) Alex Vlaar (Netherlands) Iris Tabeling
2018 IS	(France) Toma Junior Popov	(Turkey) Neslihan Yiğit	(France) Christo Popov (France) Toma Junior Popov	(Bulgaria) Gabriela Stoeva (Bulgaria) Stefani Stoeva	(Bulgaria) Alex Vlaar (Bulgaria) Mariya Mitsova
2019 IS	(France) Toma Junior Popov	(Turkey) Neslihan Yiğit	(France) Éloi Adam (France) Julien Maio	(Turkey) Bengisu Erçetin (Turkey) Nazlıcan İnci	(Canada) Joshua Hurlburt-Yu (Canada) Josephine Wu
2020 IS	Cancelled (Note: This tournament, originally to be played from 10 to 13 August, was later cancelled due to the COVID-19 pandemic in Bulgaria.)				
2021 IS	Cancelled (Note: This tournament, originally to be played from 9 to 12 August, was later cancelled due to the COVID-19 pandemic in Bulgaria.)				
2022–2024	Not held				

== Performances by nation ==
As of the 2019 edition

Pos	Nation	MS	WS	MD	WD	XD	Total
1	Bulgaria	0	11	1.5	12.5	3.5	28.5
2	Russia	2	1	2	4	5	14
3	Denmark	5	1	6	1.5	0	13.5
4	China	2	2	2	2	2	10
5	Germany	1	1	3	1	3	9
5	Poland	3	1	3	0	2	9
7	England	2	1	2	2	1.5	8.5
8	Ukraine	0	2	0	1	5	8
9	East Germany	0	2	0	2	3	7
10	Austria	4	1	0.5	0	0	5.5
11	France	2	0	3	0	0	5
11	Soviet Union	1	2	1	0	1	5
11	Turkey	0	3	0	2	0	5
14	Indonesia	0	0	2	1	1	4
14	Spain	1	3	0	0	0	4
16	Belarus	0	0	1	1	1	3
17	Japan	2	0	0	0	0	2
17	Scotland	0	0	0.5	0	1.5	2
19	Canada	0	0	0	0	1	1
19	Chinese Taipei	0	0	1	0	0	1
19	CIS	1	0	0	0	0	1
19	Czech Republic	1	0	0	0	0	1
19	Finland	1	0	0	0	0	1
19	Iceland	0	0	0	1	0	1
19	India	1	0	0	0	0	1
19	Lithuania	1	0	0	0	0	1
19	Thailand	0	0	1	0	0	1
19	United States	0	0	1	0	0	1
19	Wales	1	0	0	0	0	1
30	Malaysia	0	0	0.5	0	0	0.5
30	Netherlands	0	0	0	0	0.5	0.5
Total		31	31	31	31	31	155
