= Vladislav Druzchenko =

Ukrainian badminton player

Personal information
- Born: Владислав Георгійович Дружченко; Vladislav Georgiyovych Druzhchenko; 16 January 1973 (age 53) Dnipropetrovsk, Ukrainian SSR, Soviet Union
- Height: 1.86 m (6 ft 1 in)
- Weight: 85 kg (187 lb)

Sport
- Country: Ukraine
- Sport: Badminton
Medal record
Men's badminton
Representing Soviet Union
European Junior Championships
Gold medal – first place	1991 Budapest	Mixed team
Silver medal – second place	1991 Budapest	Boys' doubles
Bronze medal – third place	1991 Budapest	Boys' singles

Vladyslav Heorhiyovych Druzhchenko (Cyrillic: Владислав Георгійович Дружченко; born 16 January 1973) is a badminton player from Ukraine. He competed at the 1996, 2000, and 2008 Olympic Games.

== Career ==
Between 1992 and 2006, Druzhchenko won 15 Ukrainian National Badminton Championships in a row in the men's singles.

Druzchenko played the 2007 BWF World Championships in men's singles, and was defeated in the first round by Andrew Dabeka, of Canada, 16-21, 21-18, 21-16.

== Achievements ==
=== European Junior Championships ===
Boys' singles
Year	Venue	Opponent	Score	Result
1991	BMTE-Törley impozáns sportcsarnokában, Budapest, Hungary	(Netherlands) Joris van Soerland	17–18, 13–15	Bronze

Boys' doubles
Year	Venue	Partner	Opponent	Score	Result
1991	BMTE-Törley impozáns sportcsarnokában, Budapest, Hungary	(Soviet Union) Valeriy Streltsov	(Denmark) Peter Christensen (Denmark) Martin Lundgaard Hansen	7–15, 10–15	Silver

=== IBF World Grand Prix ===
The World Badminton Grand Prix has been sanctioned by the International Badminton Federation from 1983 to 2006.

Men's singles
Year	Tournament	Opponent	Score	Result
2000	Polish Open	(Wales) Richard Vaughan	15–12, 15–12	(gold) Winner
2000	German Open	(Hong Kong) Agus Hariyanto	17–15, 15–4	(gold) Winner

Mixed doubles
Year	Tournament	Partner	Opponent	Score	Result
1994	Russian Open	(Ukraine) Victoria Evtoushenko	(China) Liu Yong (China) Li Qi	12–15, 13–18	(silver) Runner-up
1995	Bulgarian Open	(Ukraine) Victoria Evtoushenko	(Belarus) Vitali Shmakov (Belarus) Vlada Chernyavskaya	17–15, 15–7	(gold) Winner
2000	Polish Open	(Ukraine) Victoria Evtoushenko	(China) Chen Qiqiu (China) Chen Lin	7–15, 8–15	(silver) Runner-up
2005	Bitburger Open	(Sweden) Johanna Persson	(New Zealand) Daniel Shirley (New Zealand) Sara Runesten-Petersen	15–11, 11–15, 15–6	(gold) Winner

=== BWF International Challenge/Series ===
Men's singles
Year	Tournament	Opponent	Score	Result
1993	Slovenian International	(Austria) Hannes Fuchs	15–18, 2–15	(silver) Runner-up
1993	Hungarian International	(Norway) Hans Sperre jr.	9–15, 11–15	(silver) Runner-up
1994	Bulgarian International	(Austria) Hannes Fuchs	11–15, 10–15	(silver) Runner-up
1994	Slovak International	(Russia) Vladislav Tikhomirov	15–10, 15–6	(gold) Winner
1995	Slovak International	(Ukraine) Valeriy Streltsov	15–4, 15–3	(gold) Winner
1998	Le Volant d'Or de Toulouse	(Ukraine) Konstantin Tatranov	12–15, 6–15	(silver) Runner-up
1999	La Chaux-de-Fonds International	(Germany) Oliver Pongratz	15–3, 15–4	(gold) Winner
1999	BMW International	(Germany) Oliver Pongratz	15–6, 9–15, 7–15	(silver) Runner-up
2000	Portugal International	(Sweden) Rikard Magnusson	9–15, 13–15	(silver) Runner-up
2000	Dutch International	(Wales) Richard Vaughan	10–15, 15–6, 15–11	(gold) Winner
2000	Russian International	(Russia) Pavel Uvarov	15–10, 15–6	(gold) Winner
2000	Le Volant d'Or de Toulouse	(China) Xie Yangchun	8–15, 16–17	(silver) Runner-up
2006	Riga International	(Spain) Pablo Abián		(silver) Runner-up
2007	Finnish International	(Denmark) Joachim Persson	14–21, 18–21	(silver) Runner-up
2007	Polish Open	(Denmark) Martin Bille Larsen	17–21, 21–19, 21–11	(gold) Winner
2008	Austrian International	(India) Anand Pawar	16–21, 15–21	(silver) Runner-up

Men's doubles
Year	Tournament	Partner	Opponent	Score	Result
1993	Slovenian International	(Ukraine) Valeriy Streltsov	(Austria) Heimo Götschl (Austria) Harald Koch	15–8, 7–15, 15–2	(gold) Winner
1993	Romanian International	(Ukraine) Valeriy Streltsov			(gold) Winner
1996	Le Volant d'Or de Toulouse	(Russia) Pavel Uvarov	(Russia) Artur Khachaturjan (Russia) Sergei Melnikov	15–13, 15–5	(gold) Winner
1999	BMW International	(Ukraine) Valeriy Streltsov	(Netherlands) Dennis Lens (Netherlands) Quinten van Dalm	9–15, 15–11, 13–15	(silver) Runner-up
2009	Kharkiv International	(Ukraine) Valeriy Atrashchenkov	(Russia) Andrey Ashmarin (Russia) Andrey Ivanov	16–21, 21–23	(silver) Runner-up
2017	Slovak Open	(Ukraine) Ivan Druzchenko	(Slovenia) Miha Ivanič (Slovenia) Andraž Krapež	21–17, 17–21, 21–14	(gold) Winner

Mixed doubles
Year	Tournament	Partner	Opponent	Score	Result
1991	Czechoslovakian International	(Soviet Union) Marina Yakusheva	(Germany) Michael Helber (Germany) Anne-Katrin Seid	15–9, 13–15, 15–4	(gold) Winner
1994	Slovak International	(Ukraine) Victoria Evtoushenko	(Russia) Artur Khachaturjan (Russia) Svetlana Alferova	15–9, 3–15, 15–10	(gold) Winner
1994	Bulgarian International	(Ukraine) Victoria Evtoushenko	(Ukraine) Konstantin Tatranov (Ukraine) Irina Koloskova	15–3, 15–8	(gold) Winner
1995	Slovak International	(Ukraine) Victoria Evtoushenko	(Ukraine) Valeriy Streltsov (Ukraine) Natalja Esipenko	17–15, 15–5	(gold) Winner
1996	Austrian International	(Ukraine) Victoria Evtoushenko	(Netherlands) Quinten van Dalm (Netherlands) Nicole van Hooren	15–4, 15–8	(gold) Winner
1996	French International	(Ukraine) Victoria Evtoushenko	(Denmark) Jesper Larsen (Denmark) Majken Vange	8–15, 17–14, 11–15	(silver) Runner-up
1997	La Chaux-de-Fonds International	(Russia) Marina Yakusheva	(England) Nathan Robertson (England) Sara Hardaker	15–9, 3–15, 15–10	(gold) Winner
1998	Le Volant d'Or de Toulouse	(Ukraine) Victoria Evtoushenko	(Germany) Michael Keck (Germany) Nicol Pitro	12–15, 10–15	(silver) Runner-up
1999	Le Volant d'Or de Toulouse	(Ukraine) Victoria Evtoushenko	(Germany) Michael Keck (Germany) Nicol Pitro	6–15, 9–15	(silver) Runner-up
2001	BMW International	(Ukraine) Elena Nozdran	(Netherlands) Chris Bruil (Netherlands) Lotte Jonathans	3–7, 7–5, 7–2, 0–7, 2–7	(silver) Runner-up
2003	Le Volant d'Or de Toulouse	(Ukraine) Elena Nozdran	(Ukraine) Dmitry Miznikov (Ukraine) Natalia Golovkina	15–6, 15–2	(gold) Winner
2004	Polish International	(Ukraine) Elena Nozdran	(China) Sun Junjie (China) Pan Pan	15–11, 15–7	(gold) Winner
2004	Finnish International	(Ukraine) Elena Nozdran	(Belarus) Andrey Konakh (Belarus) Olga Konon	15–9, 11–15, 15–17	(silver) Runner-up

BWF International Challenge tournament
BWF International Series tournament
BWF Future Series tournament
