= Czechoslovakian International =

Badminton championships

The Czechoslovakian International (also known as International Championships of the ČSSR) in badminton was an international open held in Czechoslovakia since 1972 until 1992. The tournament succeeded by Czech Open. Czechoslovak National Badminton Championships were already established in 1961.

== Winners ==
Year	Men's singles	Women's singles	Men's doubles	Women's doubles	Mixed doubles
1972	(East Germany) Edgar Michalowski	(East Germany) Monika Thiere	(West Germany) Siegfried Betz (West Germany) Franz Beinvogl	(East Germany) Monika Thiere (East Germany) Angela Michalowski	(East Germany) Roland Riese (East Germany) Monika Thiere
1973	(East Germany) Edgar Michalowski	(East Germany) Monika Thiere	(West Germany) Siegfried Betz (West Germany) Franz Beinvogl	(East Germany) Monika Thiere (East Germany) Angela Michalowski	(East Germany) Erfried Michalowsky (East Germany) Angela Michalowski
1974	(West Germany) Michael Schnaase	(East Germany) Monika Cassens	(West Germany) Siegfried Betz (West Germany) Franz Beinvogl	(East Germany) Monika Cassens (East Germany) Astrit Schreiber	(West Germany) Franz Beinvogl (West Germany) Anke Betz
1975	(East Germany) Edgar Michalowski	(East Germany) Monika Cassens	(West Germany) Gerd Kattau (West Germany) Joachim Schulz	(East Germany) Monika Cassens (East Germany) Angela Michalowski	(East Germany) Edgar Michalowski (East Germany) Monika Cassens
1976	(West Germany) Michael Schnaase	(Denmark) Inge Borgstrøm	(West Germany) Wolfgang Bochow (West Germany) Roland Maywald	(East Germany) Monika Cassens (East Germany) Angela Michalowski	(West Germany) Wolfgang Bochow (West Germany) Marieluise Zizmann
1977	(Sweden) Willy Nilsson	(Denmark) Inge Borgstrøm	(England) Michael Wilks (England) Peter Bullivant	(East Germany) Monika Cassens (East Germany) Angela Michalowski	(Netherlands) Rob Ridder (Netherlands) Marja Ridder
1978	(West Germany) Michael Schnaase	(East Germany) Monika Cassens	(England) Eddy Sutton (England) Alan Connor	(East Germany) Monika Cassens (East Germany) Angela Michalowski	(West Germany) Karl-Heinz Zwiebler (West Germany) Eva-Maria Zwiebler
1979	(Denmark) Steen Fladberg	(Denmark) Kirsten Larsen	(Denmark) Steen Fladberg (Denmark) Jens Peter Nierhoff	(England) Sally Leadbeater (England) Gillian Clark	(Denmark) Kenneth Larsen (Denmark) Charlotte Pilgaard
1980	(Denmark) Michael Kjeldsen	(Denmark) Rikke V. Sørensen	(Denmark) Jan Hammergaard-Hansen (Denmark) Jens Peter Nierhoff	(England) Kathleen Redhead (England) Gillian Clark	(East Germany) Edgar Michalowski (East Germany) Monika Cassens
1981	(Sweden) Ulf Johansson	(England) Diane Simpson	(England) Gerry Asquith (England) Duncan Bridge	(England) Diane Simpson (England) Catharine Troke	(East Germany) Edgar Michalowski (East Germany) Monika Cassens
1982	(England) Steve Butler	(England) Catharine Troke	(England) Steve Butler (England) Nigel Tier	(Soviet Union) Svetlana Belyasova (East Germany) Petra Michalowsky	(Soviet Union) Anatoliy Skripko (Soviet Union) Svetlana Belyasova
1983	(Czechoslovakia) Michal Malý	(East Germany) Monika Cassens	(Denmark) Torben Kjær (Denmark) Stephen Lunde	(East Germany) Monika Cassens (East Germany) Petra Michalowsky	(East Germany) Erfried Michalowsky (East Germany) Monika Cassens
1984	(Denmark) Kim Brodersen	(Denmark) Charlotte Hattens	(Denmark) Kim Brodersen (Denmark) Claus Thomsen	(Soviet Union) Tatyana Litvinenko (Soviet Union) Viktoria Pron	(East Germany) Erfried Michalowsky (East Germany) Petra Michalowsky
1985	(Denmark) Poul-Erik Høyer Larsen	(Denmark) Grete Mogensen	(Denmark) Poul-Erik Høyer Larsen (Denmark) Peter Buch	(Denmark) Grete Mogensen (Denmark) Hanne Adsbøl	(Denmark) Peter Buch (Denmark) Hanne Adsbøl
1986	(Soviet Union) Andrey Antropov	(Sweden) Catharina Andersson	(Czechoslovakia) Michal Malý (Czechoslovakia) Karel Lakomý	(Soviet Union) Lila Galjamova (Soviet Union) Elena Rybkina	(Soviet Union) Andrey Antropov (Soviet Union) Elena Rybkina
1987	(Czechoslovakia) Michal Malý	(Poland) Bozena Siemieniec	(Austria) Heinz Fisher (Austria) Klaus Fisher	(East Germany) Monika Cassens (East Germany) Petra Michalowsky	(East Germany) Thomas Mundt (East Germany) Monika Cassens
1988	(Austria) Klaus Fischer	(Soviet Union) Elena Rybkina	(West Germany) Stephan Kuhl (West Germany) Robert Neumann	(East Germany) Monika Cassens (East Germany) Petra Michalowsky	(East Germany) Kai Abraham (East Germany) Petra Michalowsky
1989	(Czechoslovakia) Tomasz Mendrek	(Soviet Union) Viktoria Pron	(Austria) Harald Koch (Austria) Heimo Götschl	(Soviet Union) Tatyana Litvinenko (Soviet Union) Viktoria Pron	(East Germany) Thomas Mundt (East Germany) Petra Michalowsky
1990	(Denmark) Thomas Stuer-Lauridsen	(Denmark) Camilla Martin	(Denmark) Thomas Stuer-Lauridsen (Denmark) Christian Jacobsen	(Denmark) Trine Johansson (Denmark) Marlene Thomsen	(Denmark) Christian Jacobsen (Denmark) Marlene Thomsen
1991	(Finland) Robert Liljequist	(Soviet Union) Irina Serova	(Germany) Markus Keck (Germany) Michael Helber	(Germany) Andrea Findhammer (Germany) Anne-Katrin Seid	(Soviet Union) Vladislav Druzchenko (Soviet Union) Marina Yakusheva
1992	(Czechoslovakia) Tomasz Mendrek	(Soviet Union) Irina Serova	(England) Steffan Pandya (England) Anthony Bush	(England) Tanya Groves (England) Joanne Davies	(Austria) Hans Fischer (Austria) Irina Serova
