= USSR International =

The USSR International in badminton was an international open held in the Union of Soviet Socialist Republics since 1973, and finished in 1992 with the dissolution of the Soviet Union and the establishment of the Commonwealth of Independent States (CIS), in its place.

The Russian International is the continuation of this tournament.

== Winners ==
Year	Men's singles	Women's singles	Men's doubles	Women's doubles	Mixed doubles
1973	(Germany) Wolfgang Bochow	(Denmark) Lene Køppen	(Sweden) Thomas Kihlström (Sweden) Bengt Fröman	(Denmark) Lene Køppen (Sweden) Karin Lindquist	(Denmark) Elo Hansen (Denmark) Lene Køppen
1974	No competition				
1975	(Soviet Union) Anatoliy Skripko	(Czechoslovakia) Alena Poboráková	(Soviet Union) Anatoliy Skripko (Soviet Union) Viktor Schwatschko	(Czechoslovakia) Alena Poboráková (Hungary) Éva Cserni	(Czechoslovakia) Ladislav Šrámek (Czechoslovakia) Alena Poboráková
1976	(Soviet Union) Nikolaj Nikitin	(Soviet Union) Alla Zvonareva	(Soviet Union) Anatoliy Skripko (Soviet Union) Vitaliy Shmakov	(Soviet Union) Alla Zvonareva (Soviet Union) Ljudmila Markova	(Soviet Union) Anatoliy Skripko (Soviet Union) Alla Zvonareva
1977	(Denmark) Morten Frost	(Denmark) Lonny Bostofte	(Denmark) Morten Frost (Denmark) Steen Skovgaard	(Germany) Eva-Maria Kranz (Germany) Vera Martini	(Denmark) Steen Skovgaard (Denmark) Pia Nielsen
1978	(Soviet Union) Anatoliy Skripko	(East Germany) Monika Cassens	(Soviet Union) Konstantin Wawilow (Soviet Union) Nikolay Peshekhonov	(East Germany) Monika Cassens (East Germany) Angela Michalowski	(Denmark) Mogens Neergaard (Denmark) Jette Boyer
1979	(Soviet Union) Anatoliy Skripko	(Soviet Union) Svetlana Belyasova	(Thailand) Bandid Jaiyen (Thailand) Preecha Sopajaree	(East Germany) Monika Cassens (East Germany) Angela Michalowski	(Soviet Union) Anatoliy Skripko (Soviet Union) Svetlana Belyasova
1980	No competition				
1981	(Soviet Union) Anatoliy Skripko	(Sweden) Christine Magnusson	(Denmark) Bengt Svenningsen (Denmark) Henrik Svarrer	(Sweden) Christine Magnusson (Sweden) Maria Bengtsson	(England) Duncan Bridge (England) Jill Pringle
1982	(Soviet Union) Anatoliy Skripko	(Soviet Union) Svetlana Belyasova	(Soviet Union) Vitaly Shmakov (Soviet Union) Anatoliy Skripko	(England) Wendy Massam (England) Gillian Gowers	(Soviet Union) Vitaliy Shmakov (Soviet Union) Svetlana Belyasova
1983	(Germany) Harald Klauer	(Soviet Union) Svetlana Belyasova	(Germany) Thomas Künstler (Germany) Harald Klauer	(Soviet Union) Svetlana Belyasova (Soviet Union) Ljudmila Okuneva	(Soviet Union) Vitaliy Shmakov (Soviet Union) Svetlana Belyasova
1984	(Denmark) Poul-Erik Høyer Larsen	(Soviet Union) Tatyana Litvinenko	(Sweden) Pär-Gunnar Jönsson (Sweden) Jan-Eric Antonsson	(Soviet Union) Tatyana Litvinenko (Soviet Union) Viktoria Pron	(Sweden) Ulf Persson (Sweden) Charlotta Wihlborg
1985	(India) Syed Modi	(Soviet Union) Tatyana Litvinenko	(Germany) Thomas Künstler (Germany) Stefan Frey	(Soviet Union) Svetlana Belyasova (Soviet Union) Elena Rybkina	(Soviet Union) Sergey Sevryukov (Soviet Union) Svetlana Belyasova
1986	(Denmark) Claus Thomsen	(Soviet Union) Svetlana Belyasova	(Sweden) Peter Axelsson (Sweden) Jens Olsson	(Soviet Union) Tatyana Litvinenko (Soviet Union) Viktoria Pron	(Soviet Union) Andrey Antropov (Soviet Union) Viktoria Pron
1987	(Sweden) Jens Olsson	(Soviet Union) Vlada Belyutina	(Soviet Union) Andrey Antropov (Soviet Union) Sergey Sevryukov	(Soviet Union) Svetlana Belyasova (Soviet Union) Elena Rybkina	(Denmark) Jon Holst-Christensen (Denmark) Charlotte Madsen
1988	(Soviet Union) Andrey Antropov	(Sweden) Catrine Bengtsson	(Soviet Union) Andrey Antropov (Soviet Union) Sergey Sevryukov	(Soviet Union) Elena Rybkina (Soviet Union) Irina Serova	(Soviet Union) Vitaliy Shmakov (Soviet Union) Viktoria Pron
1989	(Soviet Union) Andrey Antropov	(Soviet Union) Elena Rybkina	(Soviet Union) Andrey Antropov (Soviet Union) Sergey Sevryukov	(Soviet Union) Svetlana Belyasova (Soviet Union) Irina Serova	(Soviet Union) Vitaliy Shmakov (Soviet Union) Vlada Cherniavskaya
1990	(Soviet Union) Andrey Antropov	(Soviet Union) Elena Rybkina	(Soviet Union) Andrey Antropov (Soviet Union) Sergey Sevryukov	(Soviet Union) Elena Rybkina (Soviet Union) Vlada Cherniavskaya	(Soviet Union) Michail Korshuk (Soviet Union) Vlada Cherniavskaya
1991	(South Korea) Park Sung-woo	(Soviet Union) Elena Rybkina	(South Korea) Park Joo-bong (South Korea) Kim Moon-soo	(Soviet Union) Natalia Ivanova (Soviet Union) Julia Martinenko	(Soviet Union) Vitaliy Shmakov (Soviet Union) Vlada Cherniavskaya
1992	(Commonwealth of Independent States) Andrey Antropov	(Commonwealth of Independent States) Marina Yakusheva	(Commonwealth of Independent States) Andrey Antropov (Commonwealth of Independent States) Nikolay Zuev	(Commonwealth of Independent States) Marina Andrievskaia (Commonwealth of Independent States) Marina Yakusheva	(Commonwealth of Independent States) Nikolay Zuev (Commonwealth of Independent States) Marina Yakusheva
