= Irina Serova =

Austrian-Soviet badminton player

Personal information
- Born: 14 May 1966 (age 60) USSR
- Height: 1.6 m (5 ft 3 in)

Sport
- Country: Russia; Austria
- Sport: Badminton
- Handedness: Right
- Event: Women's singles, women's doubles and mixed doubles

Women's singles, women's doubles and mixed doubles
- BWF profile

Irina Serova (Russian: Ирина Серова; born 14 May 1966, born Irina Rozhkova, Russian: Ирина Рожкова) is an Austrian retired badminton player who initially played Badminton for Soviet Russia and later moved on to represent Austria. Serova, in her fairly long career of around 16 years won many International titles which includes in former USSR, former Czechoslovakia, Cyprus, Bulgaria, Ireland, Czechia, Malta, Hungary, Canada, Netherlands, Poland, Germany and Slovenia besides some runner-up performances in Portugal, France, England, Austria and United States. She is also a numerous time USSR national champion and Austrian national champion as well.

== Achievements ==
=== IBF World Grand Prix ===
The World Badminton Grand Prix was sanctioned by the International Badminton Federation from 1983 to 2006.

Women's singles

Year	Tournament	Opponent	Score	Result
1991	U. S. Open	(South Korea) Shim Eun-jung	8–11, 2–11	(silver) Runner-up

Mixed doubles

Year	Tournament	Partner	Opponent	Score	Result
1994	Canadian Open	(Austria) Jürgen Koch	(Denmark) Jens Eriksen (Denmark) Rikke Olsen	15–7, 15–2	(gold) Winner

=== IBF International ===
Women's singles

Year	Tournament	Opponent	Score	Result
1987	USSR International	(Soviet Union) Vlada Belyutina	–, –	(silver) Runner-up
1987	Polish International	–, –	–, –	(gold) Winner
1989	Cyprus International	(Soviet Union) Tatiana Khoroshina	11–2, 11–7	(gold) Winner
1989	USSR International	(Soviet Union) Elena Rybkina	5–11, 9–12	(silver) Runner-up
1990	USSR International	(Soviet Union) Elena Rybkina	2–11, 9–11	(silver) Runner-up
1990	Austrian International	(Soviet Union) Elena Rybkina	–, –	(silver) Runner-up
1990	Hungarian International	(South Korea) Kang Bok-seung	9–11, 11–2, 8–11	(silver) Runner-up
1990	Bulgarian International	(Germany) Katrin Schmidt	11–0, 11–0	(gold) Winner
1990 (II)	Irish International	(Germany) Katrin Schmidt	11–8, 11–7	(gold) Winner
1991	Bulgarian International	(England) Felicity Gallup	11–3, 11–0	(gold) Winner
1991	Wimbledon Open	(Soviet Union) Elena Rybkina	4–11, 12–11, 9–11	(silver) Runner-up
1991	Czechoslovakian International	(Soviet Union) Marina Yakusheva	11–5, 11–0	(gold) Winner
1992	Czechoslovakian International	(England) Alison Humby	6–11, 11–7, 11–7	(gold) Winner
1992	Malta International	(Sweden) Lotta Andersson	11–4, 11–6	(gold) Winner
1993	Austrian International	(Netherlands) Astrid van der Knaap	11–8, 11–7	(gold) Winner
1994	Czech International	(Denmark) Mette Sørensen	11–8, 11–1	(gold) Winner
1994	Portugal International	(Russia) Marina Yakusheva	11–12, 7–11	(silver) Runner-up
1994	Amor International	(Netherlands) Monique Hoogland	11–8, 11–5	(gold) Winner
1994	BMW International	–, –	–, –	(gold) Winner
1994	Slovenian International	(France) Sandra Dimbour	11–9, 11–8	(gold) Winner

Women's doubles

Year	Tournament	Partner	Opponent	Score	Result
1986	USSR International	(Soviet Union) Svetlana Belyasova	(Soviet Union) Tatyana Litvinenko (Soviet Union) Victoria Pron	–, –	(silver) Runner-up
1986	Austrian International	(Soviet Union) Klavdija Mayorova	(Netherlands) Paula Kloet (Soviet Union) Nataliya Zhavoronkova	–, –	(silver) Runner-up
1988	USSR International	(Soviet Union) Elena Rybkina	(Sweden) Karin Eriksson (Sweden) Charlotta Wihlborg	–, –	(gold) Winner
1989	Cyprus International	(Soviet Union) Tatiana Khoroshina	(Bulgaria) Diana Filipova (Bulgaria) Anetha Stambolizska	15–10, 15–10	(gold) Winner
1989	USSR International	(Soviet Union) Svetlana Belyasova	(Sweden) Astrid Crabo (Sweden) Margit Borg	17–14, 15–5	(gold) Winner
1990	Austrian International	(Soviet Union) Victoria Pron	(Soviet Union) Elena Rybkina (Soviet Union) Vlada Chernyavskaya	–, –	(silver) Runner-up

Mixed doubles

Year	Tournament	Partner	Opponent	Score	Result
1984	Austrian International	(Soviet Union) Vyatscheslav Shtshukin	(Soviet Union) Vitali Shmakov (Soviet Union) Lyubov Fedotova	11–15, 10–15	(silver) Runner-up
1986	Austrian International	(Soviet Union) Andrey Antropov	(Soviet Union) Sergey Sevryukov (Soviet Union) Klavdija Mayorova	–, –	(gold) Winner
1987	USSR International	(Soviet Union) Sergey Sevryukov	(Denmark) Jon-Holst Christensen (Denmark) Charlotte Madsen	–, –	(silver) Runner-up
1988	Polish International	(Soviet Union) Sergey Sevryukov	(South Korea) Park Joo-bong (South Korea) Chung Myung-hee	–, –	(silver) Runner-up
1989	Cyprus International	(Soviet Union) Vladimir Serov	(Soviet Union) Vladimir Smolin (Soviet Union) Tatiana Khoroshina	15–10, 15–10	(gold) Winner
1990	Bulgarian International	(Soviet Union) Nikolai Zuyev	(Poland) Jerzy Dołhan (Poland) Bożena Haracz	15–7, 15–1	(gold) Winner
1990 (II)	Irish International	(Germany) Michael Keck	(Austria) Kai Abraham (Bulgaria) Diana Koleva	15–10, 15–7	(gold) Winner
1991	USSR International	(Soviet Union) Nikolai Zuyev	(Soviet Union) Vitaliy Shmakov (Soviet Union) Vlada Chernyavskaya	15–5, 5–15, 12–15	(silver) Runner-up
1991	Wimbledon Open	(Soviet Union) Andrey Antropov	(England) Andy Goode (England) Gillian Gowers	4–15, 0–15	(silver) Runner-up
1992	Czechoslovakian International	(Austria) Heinz Fischer	(Commonwealth of Independent States) Andrey Antropov (Commonwealth of Independent States) Olga Chernyshova	15–12, 9–15, 17–14	(gold) Winner
1992	Malta International	(Malta) Kenneth Mella	(Austria) Kai Abraham (Austria) Sabine Ploner	7–15, 5–15	(silver) Runner-up
1993	Austrian International	(Austria) Heinz Fischer	(England) Nick Ponting (England) Joanne Wright	9–15, 7–15	(silver) Runner-up
1993	La Chaux-de-Fonds	(Austria) Heinz Fischer	(Netherlands) Ron Michels (Netherlands) Sonja Mellink	7–15, 9–15	(silver) Runner-up
1994	Czech International	(Austria) Jürgen Koch	(Russia) Artur Khachaturjan (Russia) Svetlana Alferova	15–5, 15–7	(gold) Winner
1994	Victor Cup	(Austria) Jürgen Koch	(Germany) Uwe Ossenbrink (Germany) Viola Rathgeber	15–2, 15–8	(gold) Winner
1995	Hungarian International	(Austria) Jürgen Koch	(England) Nathan Robertson (England) Gail Emms	15–6, 15–8	(gold) Winner
1998	Austrian International	(Austria) Jürgen Koch	(Scotland) Kenny Middlemiss (Scotland) Elinor Middlemiss	15–18, 4–15	(silver) Runner-up
