= Andrey Antropov =

Russian badminton player

Andrey Antropov Андрей Антропов
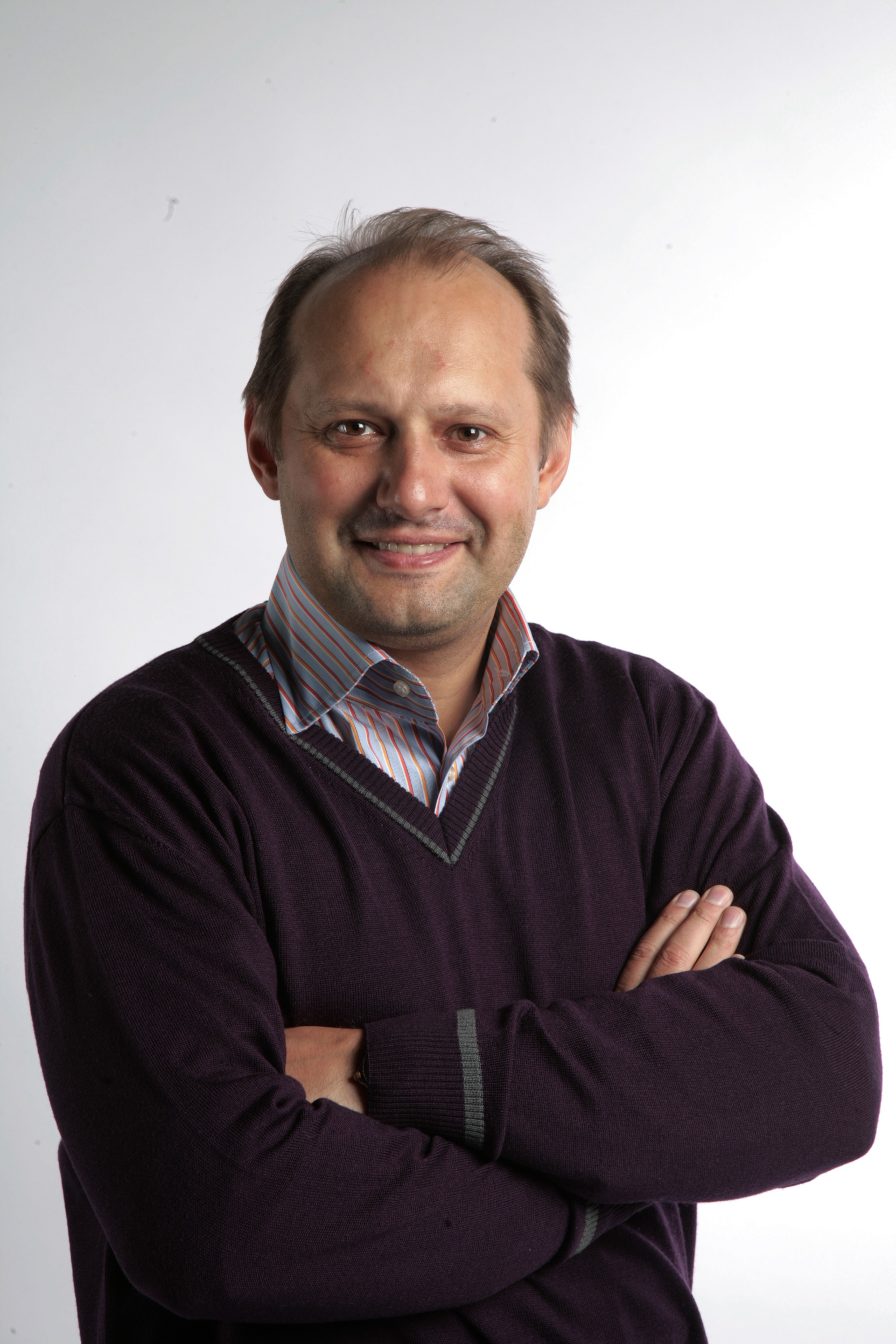

Personal information
- Born: Andrey Mikhaylovich Antropov (Андрей Михайлович Антропов); 21 June 1967 (age 59) Omsk, Russian SFSR, Soviet Union
- Height: 1.78 m (5 ft 10 in)
- Weight: 72 kg (159 lb)

Sport
- Country: Russia
- Sport: Badminton
- Handedness: Left
- BWF profile
Medal record
Men's badminton
Representing Russia
World Cup
Bronze medal – third place	1996 Jakarta	Men's doubles
European Championships
Silver medal – second place	1994 Den Bosch	Men's doubles
Representing Soviet Union
European Championships
Bronze medal – third place	1988 Kristiansand	Men's singles
European Junior Championships
Bronze medal – third place	1985 Pressbaum	Mixed doubles

Andrey Mikhaylovich Antropov (Russian: Андрей Михайлович Антропов; born 21 May 1967) is a Russian badminton player who represented the Soviet Union and Russian Federation at the European Badminton Championships and the Unified Team and Russia at the 1992 and 1996 Olympics, respectively.

Antropov competed in badminton at the 1996 Summer Olympics in men's doubles with partner Nikolai Zuyev. They were defeated by Antonius Ariantho and Denny Kantono of Indonesia (15-5, 15-1) in the quarter-finals. Antropov earned the silver medal in the men's doubles with Zuyev at the 14th European Badminton Championships in Den Bosch, Netherlands, 10–17 April 1994. He also competed in men's singles at the 1992 and 1996 Olympics.

== Achievements ==
=== World Cup ===
Men's doubles
Year	Venue	Partner	Opponent	Score	Result
1996	Istora Senayan; Jakarta, Indonesia	(Russia) Nikolai Zuyev	(Indonesia) Sigit Budiarto (Indonesia) Rexy Mainaky	15–9, 3–15, 3–15	Bronze

=== European Championships ===
Men's singles
Year	Venue	Opponent	Score	Result
1988	Badmintonsenteret; Kristiansand, Norway	(Denmark) Morten Frost	3–15, 2–15	Bronze

Men's doubles
Year	Venue	Partner	Opponent	Score	Result
1994	Maaspoort Sports and Events; Den Bosch, Netherlands	(Russia) Nikolai Zuyev	(England) Simon Archer (England) Chris Hunt	16–18, 4–15	Silver

=== European Junior Championships ===
Mixed doubles
Year	Venue	Partner	Opponent	Score	Result
1985	Sacré Coeur Cloister Hall, Pressbaum, Austria	(Soviet Union) Tatyana Volchek	(Denmark) Max Gandrup (Denmark) Charlotte Jacobsen	5–15, 5–15	Bronze

=== IBF World Grand Prix ===
The World Badminton Grand Prix was sanctioned by the International Badminton Federation from 1983 to 2006.

Men's singles
Year	Tournament	Opponent	Score	Result
1991	Canadian Open	(England) Steve Butler	15–17, 12–15	(silver) Runner-up

Men's doubles
Year	Tournament	Partner	Opponent	Score	Result
1994	Scottish Open	(Russia) Nikolai Zuyev	(Denmark) Jens Eriksen (Denmark) Christian Jakobsen	17–14, 13–15, 15–6	(gold) Winner
1995	French Open	(Russia) Nikolai Zuyev	(Indonesia) Sigit Budiarto (Indonesia) Dicky Purwotjugiono	8–15, 11–15	(silver) Runner-up
1996	Russian Open	(Russia) Nikolai Zuyev	(China) Ge Cheng (China) Tao Xiaoqiang	10–15, 17–15, 15–5	(gold) Winner

=== IBF International ===
Men's singles
Year	Tournament	Opponent	Score	Result
1985	USSR International	(India) Syed Modi	–, –	(silver) Runner-up
1986	USSR International	(Denmark) Claus Thomsen	–, –	(silver) Runner-up
1986	Czechoslovakian International	(Sweden) Patrik Andreasson	–, –	(gold) Winner
1987	USSR International	(Sweden) Jens Olsson	–, –	(silver) Runner-up
1988	USSR International	(Sweden) Jörgen Tuvesson	15–6, 15–4	(gold) Winner
1988	Hungarian International	(Austria) Klaus Fischer	15–5, 15–10	(gold) Winner
1989	Austrian International	(Denmark) Claus Thomsen	15–18, 15–10, 15–12	(gold) Winner
1989	USSR International	(Denmark) Thomas Stuer-Lauridsen	17–16, 6–15, 15–11	(gold) Winner
1989	Hungarian International	(South Korea) Phyon Hwang-min	–, –	(gold) Winner
1990	Austrian International	(Germany) Stephan Kuhl	–, –	(gold) Winner
1990	USSR International	(Soviet Union) Pavel Uvarov	15–5, 15–8	(gold) Winner
1990	Bulgarian International	(Denmark) Carsten Steenberg	15–0, 15–11	(gold) Winner
1990	Irish International	(Austria) Jürgen Koch	15–7, 15–7	(gold) Winner
1992	Amor International	(Finland) Pontus Jäntti	15–8, 11–15, 3–15	(silver) Runner-up
1992	Austrian International	(India) Rajeev Bagga	15–12, 15–0	(gold) Winner
1992	Portugal International	(Sri Lanka) Niroshan Wijekoon	15–8, 15–5	(gold) Winner
1992	Russian International	(Commonwealth of Independent States) Pavel Uvarov	15–11, 15–10	(gold) Winner
1993	Portugal International	(Hong Kong) Chan Kin Ngai	15–8, 15–3	(gold) Winner
1994	La Chaux-de-Fonds International	(Sweden) Henrik Bengtsson	15–1, 15–3	(gold) Winner
1994	Wimbledon International	(Netherlands) Joris van Soerland	15–9, 10–15, 15–7	(gold) Winner

Men's doubles
Year	Tournament	Partner	Opponent	Score	Result
1987	USSR International	(Soviet Union) Sergey Sevryukov	(Sweden) Peter Axelsson (Sweden) Jens Olsson	–, –	(gold) Winner
1988	USSR International	(Soviet Union) Sergey Sevryukov	(Sweden) Peter Axelsson (Sweden) Rikard Rönnblom	15–9, 15–3	(gold) Winner
1988	Hungarian International	(Soviet Union) Sergey Melnikov	(Poland) Jerzy Dołhan (Poland) Jacek Hankiewicz	15–0, 15–6	(gold) Winner
1989	Stockholm International	(Soviet Union) Vitaliy Shmakov	(Denmark) Max Gandrup (Denmark) Thomas Lund	6–15, 14–18	(silver) Runner-up
1989	USSR International	(Soviet Union) Sergey Sevryukov	(Denmark) Thomas Kirkegaard (Denmark) Jens Meibom	15–9, 15–6	(gold) Winner
1989	Hungarian International	(Soviet Union) Sergey Sevryukov	(South Korea) Sung Han-kuk (South Korea) Shon Jin-hwan	–, –	(silver) Runner-up
1990	USSR International	(Soviet Union) Sergey Sevryukov	(Soviet Union) Alexej Sidorov (Soviet Union) Pavel Uvarov	15–2, 15–8	(gold) Winner
1990	Bulgarian International	(Soviet Union) Nikolai Zuyev	(Soviet Union) Igor Dmitriev (Soviet Union) Mikhail Korshuk	15–7, 15–2	(gold) Winner
1990	Irish International	(Soviet Union) Sergey Melnikov	(England) Michael Brown (England) Chris Hunt	4–15, 5–15	(silver) Runner-up
1992	Portugal International	(Commonwealth of Independent States) Nikolai Zuyev	(England) Andy Goode (England) Chris Hunt	11–15, 12–15	(silver) Runner-up
1992	Russian International	(Commonwealth of Independent States) Nikolai Zuyev	(Commonwealth of Independent States) Vitaliy Shmakov (Commonwealth of Independent States) Pavel Uvarov	15–7, 15–10	(gold) Winner
1992	Irish International	(Commonwealth of Independent States) Nikolai Zuyev	(England) Chris Hunt (England) Julian Robertson	12–15, 15–10, 18–15	(gold) Winner
1993	Portugal International	(Russia) Nikolai Zuyev	(Hong Kong) Chan Kin Ngai (Hong Kong) Wong Wai Lap	15–10, 7–15, 11–15	(silver) Runner-up
1993	Amor International	(Russia) Nikolai Zuyev	(Germany) Stefan Frey (Germany) Stephan Kuhl	15–3, 15–5	(gold) Winner
1994	Austrian International	(Russia) Nikolai Zuyev	(Denmark) Thomas Damgaard (Denmark) Jan Jørgensen	15–6, 15–10	(gold) Winner
1994	Wimbledon International	(Russia) Nikolai Zuyev	(Wales) Neil Cottrill (England) John Quinn	15–12, 15–7	(gold) Winner
1994	Welsh International	(Russia) Nikolai Zuyev	(England) Nick Ponting (England) Julian Robertson	15–2, 15–6	(gold) Winner
1995	La Chaux-de-Fonds International	(Russia) Nikolai Zuyev	(Germany) Michael Helber (Germany) Michael Keck	15–11, 15–12	(gold) Winner
1995	Welsh International	(Russia) Nikolai Zuyev	(England) Julian Robertson (England) Nathan Robertson	15–8, 15–8	(gold) Winner

Mixed doubles
Year	Tournament	Partner	Opponent	Score	Result
1986	USSR International	(Soviet Union) Viktoria Pron	(Denmark) Peter Buch (Denmark) Grete Mogensen	–, –	(gold) Winner
1986	Czechoslovakian International	(Soviet Union) Elena Rybkina	(Czechoslovakia) Michal Malý (Czechoslovakia) Dana Malá	–, –	(gold) Winner
1986	Austrian International	(Soviet Union) Irina Rozhkova	(Soviet Union) Sergey Sevryukov (Soviet Union) Klavdija Mayorova	–, –	(gold) Winner
1989	Stockholm International	(Soviet Union) Elena Rybkina	(Denmark) Jon Holst-Christensen (Denmark) Dorte Kjær	7–15, 15–10, 15–6	(gold) Winner
1989	Austrian International	(Soviet Union) Elena Rybkina	(Netherlands) Ron Michels (Netherlands) Esther Villanueva	15–10, 15–6	(gold) Winner
1991	Wimbledon Open	(Soviet Union) Irina Serova	(England) Andy Goode (England) Gillian Gowers	4–15, 0–15	(silver) Runner-up
1992	Czechoslovakian International	(Commonwealth of Independent States) Olga Chernyshova	(Austria) Heinz Fischer (Austria) Irina Serova	12–15, 15–9, 14–17	(silver) Runner-up
