= Ukrainian National Badminton Championships =

The Ukrainian National Badminton Championships is a tournament organized to crown the best badminton players in Ukraine.

The tournament started in 1992 and is held every year.

== Past winners ==
Year	Men's singles	Women's singles	Men's doubles	Women's doubles	Mixed doubles
1992	Vladislav Druzchenko	Victoria Evtoushenko	Vladislav Druzchenko; Valeriy Strelcov	Victoria Evtoushenko; Tatyana Litvinenko	Vladislav Druzchenko; Victoria Evtoushenko
1993	Vladislav Druzchenko	Elena Nozdran	Vladislav Druzchenko; Valeriy Strelcov	Victoria Evtoushenko; Tatyana Litvinenko	Valeriy Strelcov; Victoria Evtoushenko
1994	Vladislav Druzchenko	Elena Nozdran	Valeriy Strelcov; Konstantin Tatranov	Victoria Evtoushenko; Elena Nozdran	Vladislav Druzchenko; Victoria Evtoushenko
1995	Vladislav Druzchenko	Elena Nozdran	Valeriy Strelcov; Konstantin Tatranov	Victoria Evtoushenko; Elena Nozdran	Vladislav Druzchenko; Victoria Evtoushenko
1996	Vladislav Druzchenko	Elena Nozdran	Valeriy Strelcov; Konstantin Tatranov	Victoria Evtoushenko; Elena Nozdran	Vladislav Druzchenko; Victoria Evtoushenko
1997	Vladislav Druzchenko	Elena Nozdran	Valeriy Strelcov; Konstantin Tatranov	Victoria Evtoushenko; Elena Nozdran	Vladislav Druzchenko; Victoria Evtoushenko
1998	Vladislav Druzchenko	Elena Nozdran	Valeriy Strelcov; Konstantin Tatranov	Victoria Evtoushenko; Elena Nozdran	Valeriy Strelcov; Elena Nozdran
1999	Vladislav Druzchenko	Elena Nozdran	Valeriy Strelcov; Konstantin Tatranov	Victoria Evtoushenko; Elena Nozdran	Vladislav Druzchenko; Victoria Evtoushenko
2000	Vladislav Druzchenko	Elena Nozdran	Dmitriy Miznikov; Dmitriy Slavgorodskiy	Natalia Golovkina; Natalia Esipenko	Vladislav Druzchenko; Victoria Evtoushenko
2001	Vladislav Druzchenko	Elena Nozdran	Vladislav Druzchenko; Konstantin Tatranov	Elena Nozdran; Irina Koloskova	Vladislav Druzchenko; Elena Nozdran
2002	Vladislav Druzchenko	Elena Nozdran	Vladislav Druzchenko; Valeriy Strelcov	Elena Nozdran; Larisa Griga	Vladislav Druzchenko; Elena Nozdran
2003	Vladislav Druzchenko	Natalia Golovkina	Vladislav Druzchenko; Micailo Mizin	Larisa Griga; Oleksandra Bardakova	Vladislav Druzchenko; Elena Nozdran
2004	Vladislav Druzchenko	Elena Nozdran	Micailo Mizin; Valeriy Strelcov	Elena Nozdran; Larisa Griga	Vladislav Druzchenko; Elena Nozdran
2005	Vladislav Druzchenko	Elena Nozdran	Vladislav Druzchenko; Micailo Mizin	Elena Nozdran; Larisa Griga	Vladislav Druzchenko; Elena Nozdran
2006	Vladislav Druzchenko	Elena Nozdran	Vladislav Druzchenko; Micailo Mizin	Elena Nozdran; Larisa Griga	Vladislav Druzchenko; Elena Nozdran
2007	Dmytro Zavadsky	Larisa Griga	Valeriy Atrashchenkov; Dmitry Miznikov	Elena Nozdran; Larisa Griga	Vladislav Druzchenko; Elena Nozdran
2008	Dmytro Zavadsky	Larisa Griga	Vladislav Druzchenko; Maxim Martynenko	Elena Prus; Larisa Griga	Dmytro Zavadsky; Mariya Diptan
2009	Dmytro Zavadsky	Mariya Diptan	Dmytro Zavadsky; Vitaliy Konov	Elena Prus; Anna Kobceva	Dmytro Zavadsky; Mariya Diptan
2010	Valeriy Atrashchenkov	Mariya Diptan	Vladislav Druzchenko; Valeriy Atrashchenkov	Elena Prus; Anna Kobceva	Dmytro Zavadsky; Mariya Diptan
2011	Dmytro Zavadsky	Larisa Griga	Vladislav Druzchenko; Valeriy Atrashchenkov	Elena Prus; Anna Kobceva	Valeriy Atrashchenkov; Elena Prus
2012	Valeriy Atrashchenkov	Marija Ulitina	Vladislav Druzchenko; Valeriy Atrashchenkov	Larisa Griga; Anna Kobceva	Vladislav Druzchenko; Natalya Voytsekh
2013	Dmytro Zavadsky	Larisa Griga	Valeriy Atrashchenkov; Eugene Pochtarev	Mariya Diptan; Yelyzaveta Zharka	Dmytro Zavadsky; Mariya Diptan
2014	Dmytro Zavadsky	Marija Ulitina	Valeriy Atrashchenkov; Gennadiy Natarov	Natalya Voytsekh; Yelyzaveta Zharka	Valeriy Atrashchenkov; Yelyzaveta Zharka
2015	Dmytro Zavadsky	Marija Ulitina	Gennadiy Natarov; Artem Pochtarev	Natalya Voytsekh; Yelyzaveta Zharka	Valeriy Atrashchenkov; Yelyzaveta Zharka
2016	Dmytro Zavadsky	Marija Ulitina	Valeriy Atrashchenkov; Dmytro Zavadsky	Natalya Voytsekh; Yelyzaveta Zharka	Valeriy Atrashchenkov; Yelyzaveta Zharka
2017	Artem Pochtarev	Marija Ulitina	Gennadiy Natarov; Artem Pochtarev	Yuliya Kazarinova; Elena Prus	Valeriy Atrashchenkov; Yelyzaveta Zharka
2018	Artem Pochtarev	Marija Ulitina	Valeriy Atrashchenkov; Artem Pochtarev	Maryna Ilyinskaya; Yelyzaveta Zharka	Valeriy Atrashchenkov; Yelyzaveta Zharka
2019	Artem Pochtarev	Marija Ulitina	Valeriy Atrashchenkov; Artem Pochtarev	Maryna Ilyinskaya; Yelyzaveta Zharka	Valeriy Atrashchenkov; Yelyzaveta Zharka
2020	Danylo Bosniuk	Marija Ulitina	Vitaly Konov; Oleksander Shmundyak	Natalya Voytsekh; Marija Ulitina	Valeriy Atrashchenkov; Valeriya Rudakova
2021	Danylo Bosniuk	Polina Buhrova	Vitaly Konov; Oleksander Shmundyak	Polina Buhrova; Yana Sobko	Danylo Bosniuk; Yevheniia Paksiutova
2022	Not held				
2023	Artem Pochtarev	Polina Buhrova	Vitaly Konov; Artem Pochtarev	Polina Buhrova; Yevheniia Kantemyr	Valeriy Atrashchenkov; Valeriya Rudakova
