= Christine Jacobs-Wagner =

American molecular biologist

Christine Jacobs-Wagner (born December 27, 1968) is an American microbial molecular biologist. She is the Dennis Cunningham Professor of Biology and Microbiology and Immunology at Stanford University. Jacobs-Wagner's research has shown that bacterial cells have a great deal of substructure, including analogs of microfilaments, and that proteins are directed by regulatory processes to locate to specific places within the bacterial cell. She was elected to the National Academy of Sciences in 2015 and has received a number of scientific awards.

== Early life and education ==
Christine Jacobs-Wagner grew up in Belgium in a town near Liege. She thought of becoming a cyclist or a badminton Olympian, but was undecided about a career through high school. Jacobs-Wagner received her BS degree in biochemistry from the University of Liege; she also received her MS in 1991 and her PhD in 1996 from the University of Liege in the field of biochemistry. She subsequently worked with Lucy Shapiro at Stanford Medical School on a fellowship from the European Molecular Biology Organization, where she studied Caulobacter, a bacterium with a flagellum on one end and a stalk on the other end, beginning her fascination with how bacterial cells can become asymmetrical. From 2004 to 2019, she taught and conducted research as a professor at Yale University.

== Academic career ==
As of 2025, Jacobs-Wagner is the Dennis Cunningham Professor of Biology and Microbiology and Immunology at Stanford University.

== Research ==
Christine Jacobs-Wagner's major breakthrough has been the discovery bacterial cells, such as those from Caulobacter, Escherichia coli, and Borrelia, program the locations of their protein components via their regulatory systems. She also discovered the protein crescentin, which forms bacterial intermediate filaments, structures once thought to occur only in eukaryotic cells. The current focus of her laboratory's work is to discover regulation of the times and places for critical components of the DNA replication and cell division processes so that proliferation control can be understood.

== Awards and recognition ==
- National Academy of Sciences (2015)
- Eli Lilly Award American Society of Microbiology (2011)
- WALS lecture National Institute of Health (2009)
- Elizabeth McCoy Lecture
- Finalist, Blatvanik Award for Young Scientists New York Academy of Sciences (2008)
- Women in Cell Biology WICB Junior and Senior Award by American Society of Cell Biology (2007)
- Pew Scholarship Award in the Biomedical Sciences PEW Charitable Trust (2003)
- Grand Prize Winner of the Young Scientist Award GE & Science (1997)

== Selected works ==
- MT Cabeen, C Jacobs-Wagner 2005 “Bacterial Cell Shape” Nature Reviews Microbiology 3 (8):601-610.
- O. Sliusarenko, J Heinritz, T Emonet, and C Jacobs-Wagner 2011 “High-throughput, suppixel precision analysis of bacterial morphogenesis and spatio-temporal dynamics.” Molecular Microbiology 80 (3):612-627.
- N Ausmees, JR Kuhn, and C Jacobs-Wagner (2003) “The bacterial cytoskeleton: an intermediate filament-like function in cell shape“ Cell 115 (6): 705-713.
- PM Llopis, AF Jackson, O Sliusarenko, I Surovtsev, J Heinritz, T Emonet...C Jacobs-Wagner (2010) “Spatial organization of the flow of genetic information in bacteria“ Nature 466 (7302):77-81.
- G Laloux and C Jacobs-Wagner (2014) “How do bacteria localize proteins to the cell pole? J Cell Science 127: 11-19. doi:10.1242/jcs.138328
- M Cabeen and C Jacobs-Wagner (2010) “The bacterial cytoskeleton” Annu Rev Genetics 44: 365-382.
