= Svetlana Zilberman =

Israeli badminton player

Svetlana Zilberman סבטלנה זילברמן
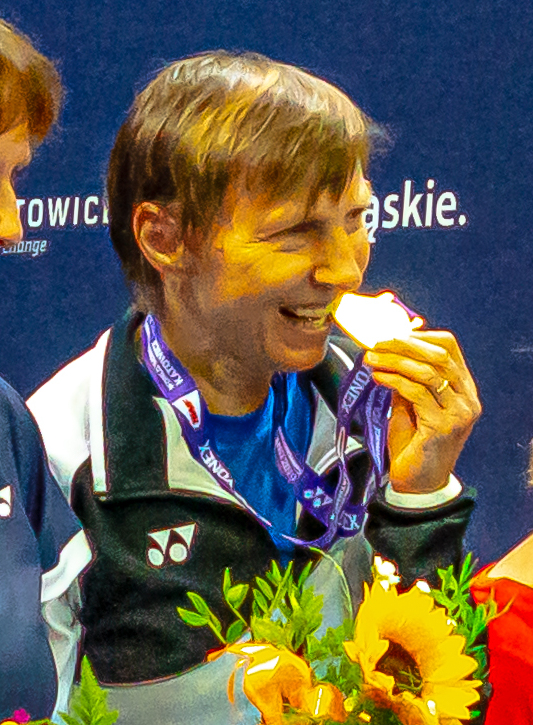
- Zilberman in 2019

Personal information
- Born: Svetlana Beliasova; 10 May 1958 (age 68) Belarus
- Height: 1.63 m (5 ft 4 in)

Sport
- Country: Israel
- Sport: Badminton
- Handedness: Right

Mixed doubles
- Highest ranking: 63 (with Misha Zilberman, 2 April 2019)
- BWF profile
Medal record
Women's badminton
Representing Soviet Union
European Championships
Bronze medal – third place	1986 Uppsala	Women's singles

Svetlana Zilberman (Hebrew: סבטלנה זילברמן; née Beliasova, born 10 May 1958) is an Israeli badminton player and coach that formerly represented the Soviet Union, then Israel. She is currently the oldest badminton player that is still active. In 1986, she won a bronze medal at the European Badminton Championships in the women's singles event. She also serves as coach of her son Olympic badminton player Misha Zilberman (along with her husband), and as coach of Israel's national badminton team

== Early life; European Championships bronze medal ==
She was born in Belarus. She began playing badminton at the age of 12, which is how she met her future husband Michael, who was her coach.

When she lived in the Soviet Union, she was one of the top European women's singles players. When she was 25 years old, she was for a time considered too old for the Soviet Union national badminton team. Nevertheless, at the USSR International she won the women's singles in 1979, 1982, 1983, and 1986, the women's doubles in 1983, 1985, 1987, and 1989, and the mixed doubles in 1979, 1982, 1983, and 1985. In 1981 she won the gold medals in the women's singles and women's doubles at the French Open. In 1982 she won the gold medals in the women's doubles and mixed doubles at the Czechoslovakian International. In 1986 she won the gold medals in the women's singles, women's doubles, and mixed doubles at the Hungarian International.

In 1986, she also won a bronze medal at the European Badminton Championships in the women's singles event.

== Israel ==
Zilberman, her husband, and their son Misha Zilberman immigrated to Israel in 1991. She and her husband run two badminton clubs in Israel, and she also serves as coach of her son Misha (along with her husband), and as coach of Israel's national badminton team. Misha describes his mother as "the most important person in my career, the inspiration for my whole life." Misha is also a badminton player, and has competed at the 2012, 2016, and 2020 Summer Olympics, and has also competed in the 2024 Summer Olympics.

After emigrating to Israel, she won the Israeli National Badminton Championships 17 times in the women's singles and doubles event, and 21 times in the mixed doubles event, as of 2016.

She won the gold medals in the 1997 Cyprus International women's singles, mixed doubles, and women's doubles, and in the 1998 Israel Open women's singles, mixed doubles, and women's doubles. At the 2003 IBF World Senior Championships in the age 40+ category, she won gold medals in the women's singles and women's doubles.

In 2009, Zilberman first played mixed doubles with her son, in the world championships; at the same time, she is his coach. Misha said that their relationship on court is "like any mixed doubles players," as they discuss how to improve and win the match, but that off the court "she is my coach, so there is no discussion."

They won the mixed doubles gold medals at the 2016 Suriname International in Paramaribo, Suriname, at the 2017 Lagos International in Lagos, Nigeria, and at the 2018 Ethiopia International in Addis Ababa, Ethiopia. At the 2019 BWF World Senior Championships in the age 60+ category, she won gold medals in the women's singles and women's doubles, and at the 2021 BWF World Senior Championships in the age 60+ category, she won the women's singles.

At the BWF World Championships 2022 in August, at the age of 64 years old Zilberman became the oldest player to win a match in competition history. She and her 33-year-old son Misha defeated Egyptian Olympians Adham Hatem Elgamal/Doha Hany. The next-youngest badminton player on the list was 38 years old.

== Achievements ==
=== European Championships ===
Women's singles
Year	Venue	Opponent	Score	Result
1986	Fyrishallen, Uppsala, Sweden	(England) Helen Troke	3–11, 7–11	Bronze

=== BWF International (3 titles, 1 runner-up) ===
Mixed doubles
Year	Tournament	Partner	Opponent	Score	Result
2016	Suriname International	(Israel) Misha Zilberman	(Trinidad and Tobago) Alistair Espinoza (Trinidad and Tobago) Solangel Guzman	21–14, 21–15	(gold) Winner
2017	Lagos International	(Israel) Misha Zilberman	(Portugal) Duarte Nuno Anjo (Portugal) Sofia Setim	20–22, 21–16, 21–7	(gold) Winner
2017	Ethiopia International	(Israel) Misha Zilberman	(Algeria) Sifeddine Larbaoui (Algeria) Linda Mazri	Walkover	(gold) Winner
2017	Zambia International	(Israel) Misha Zilberman	(Germany) Jonathan Persson (Mauritius) Kate Foo Kune	Walkover	(silver) Runner-up

BWF International Challenge tournament
BWF International Series tournament
BWF Future Series tournament

=== IBF International ===
Women's singles
Year	Tournament	Opponent	Score	Result
1979	USSR International	(Thailand) Sirisriro Patama		(gold) Winner
1981	French Open	(England) Gillian Clark		(gold) Winner
1981	USSR International	(Sweden) Christine Magnusson	11–7, 7–11, 6–11	(silver) Runner-up
1982	USSR International	(Soviet Union) Tatyana Litvinenko	11–5, 12–10	(gold) Winner
1983	USSR International	(Soviet Union) Tatyana Litvinenko	11–4, 7–11, 11–7	(gold) Winner
1984	USSR International	(Soviet Union) Tatyana Litvinenko	4–11, 11–2, 5–11	(silver) Runner-up
1985	USSR International	(Soviet Union) Tatyana Litvinenko	3–11, 9–12	(silver) Runner-up
1985	Mozambique International	(Soviet Union) Elena Rybkina	12–9, 11–8	(gold) Winner
1986	USSR International	(India) Madhumita Bisht	2–10, 8–11, 11–3	(gold) Winner
1986	Hungarian International	(Soviet Union) Vlada Belyutina	11–0, 10–12, 11–2	(gold) Winner
1989	Norwegian International	(Denmark) Camilla Martin	2–11, 3–11	(silver) Runner-up
1997	Cyprus International	(Cyprus) Diana Knekna	11–1, 11–3	(gold) Winner
1998	Israel International	(Cyprus) Diana Knekna	11–0, 11–1	(gold) Winner
1998	Amor International	(Netherlands) Judith Meulendijks	4–11, 0–11	(silver) Runner-up
2000	Cyprus International	(Bulgaria) Margarita Mladenova	8–11, 8–11	(silver) Runner-up

Women's doubles
Year	Tournament	Partner	Opponent	Score	Result
1981	French Open	(Soviet Union) Vard Poghosyan			(gold) Winner
1982	Czechoslovakian International	(East Germany) Petra Michalowsky	(East Germany) Monika Cassens (East Germany) Angela Michalowski	15–11, 16–17, 15–11	(gold) Winner
1982	USSR International	(Soviet Union) Ludmila Suslo	(England) Wendy Massam (England) Gillian Gowers	11–15, 11–15	(silver) Runner-up
1983	USSR International	(Soviet Union) Lyudmila Okuneva	(East Germany) Monika Cassens (East Germany) Petra Michalowsky	15–9, 15–5	(gold) Winner
1985	USSR International	(Soviet Union) Elena Rybkina	(Soviet Union) Tatyana Litvinenko (Soviet Union) Viktoria Pron	15–8, 9–15, 15–5	(gold) Winner
1985	Mozambique International	(Soviet Union) Elena Rybkina	(Nigeria) Bridget Ibenero (Soviet Union) Vlada Belyutina	15–0, 15–7	(gold) Winner
1986	USSR International	(Soviet Union) Irina Serova	(Soviet Union) Tatyana Litvinenko (Soviet Union) Viktoria Pron	5–15, 18–13, 12–15	(silver) Runner-up
1986	Hungarian International	(Soviet Union) Vlada Belyutina	(East Germany) Monika Cassens (East Germany) Petra Michalowsky	15–12, 15–7	(gold) Winner
1987	USSR International	(Soviet Union) Elena Rybkina	(Denmark) Charlotte Madsen (Denmark) Lisbet Stuer-Lauridsen	15–2, 17–14	(gold) Winner
1989	Norwegian International	(Soviet Union) Irina Serova	(Denmark) Camilla Martin (Denmark) Lotte Olsen	10–15, 10–15	(silver) Runner-up
1989	USSR International	(Soviet Union) Irina Serova	(Sweden) Margit Borg (Sweden) Astrid Crabo	17–14, 15–5	(gold) Winner
1997	Cyprus International	(Israel) Shirley Daniel	(Cyprus) Elena Iasonos (Cyprus) Diana Knekna	16–17, 15–4, 15–3	(gold) Winner
1998	Israel International	(Bulgaria) Diana Koleva	(Cyprus) Elena Iasonos (Cyprus) Diana Knekna	15–1, 15–2	(gold) Winner

Mixed doubles
Year	Tournament	Partner	Opponent	Score	Result
1979	USSR International	(Soviet Union) Anatoliy Skripko	(Soviet Union) Viktor Shvachko (Soviet Union) Nadezhda Litvincheva		(gold) Winner
1982	Czechoslovakian International	(Soviet Union) Anatoliy Skripko	(East Germany) Edgar Michalowski (East Germany) Monika Cassens	15–7, 15–11	(gold) Winner
1982	USSR International	(Soviet Union) Vitaliy Shmakov	(East Germany) Edgar Michalowski (East Germany) Monika Cassens	15–10, 15–11	(gold) Winner
1983	USSR International	(Soviet Union) Vitaliy Shmakov	(East Germany) Edgar Michalowski (East Germany) Monika Cassens	15–8, 15–10	(gold) Winner
1985	Mozambique International	(Soviet Union) Anatoliy Skripko	(Nigeria) Clement Ogbo (Nigeria) Dayo Oyewusi	15–1, 15–4	(gold) Winner
1985	USSR International	(Soviet Union) Sergey Sevryukov	(West Germany) Stefan Frey (West Germany) Mechtild Hagemann	15–2, 15–12	(gold) Winner
1986	Hungarian International	(Soviet Union) Vitaliy Shmakov	(East Germany) Thomas Mundt (East Germany) Monika Cassens	15–10, 15–10	(gold) Winner
1997	Cyprus International	(Israel) Leon Pougatch	(Denmark) Peter Jensen (Denmark) Karin Knudsen	3–15, 15–2, 15–13	(gold) Winner
1998	Israel International	(Israel) Leon Pougatch	(Israel) Nir Yusim (Cyprus) Diana Knekna	15–4, 15–5	(gold) Winner
2000	Cyprus International	(Israel) Leon Pougatch	(Bulgaria) Konstantin Dobrev (Bulgaria) Dobrinka Smilanova	15–4, 15–5	(gold) Winner
