= Vlada Chernyavskaya =

Belarusian badminton player (born 1966)

Personal information
- Nationality: Belarusian
- Born: 10 August 1966 (age 58)

Sport
- Sport: Badminton

Vlada Anatolyevna Chernyavskaya (Belarusian: Улада Анатольеўна Чарняўская, Russian: Влада Анатольевна Чернявская; born 10 August 1966) is a Belarusian badminton player. She competed in women's singles and mixed doubles at the 1996 Summer Olympics in Atlanta.
