= Elena Rybkina =

Russian badminton player (born 1964)

Personal information
- Born: Elena Vladimirovna Rybkina (Елена Владимировна Рыбкина); 24 April 1964 (age 62) Moscow, Soviet Union
- Height: 1.64 m (5 ft 5 in)

Sport
- Country: Russia
- Sport: Badminton
- Event: Women's singles & doubles

Women's singles & doubles
- BWF profile
Medal record
Women's badminton
Representing CIS
European Championships
Bronze medal – third place	1992 Glasgow	Women's singles

Elena Vladimirovna Rybkina (Russian: Елена Владимировна Рыбкина; born 24 April 1964) is a Russian badminton player. Rybkina competed in women's singles at the 1992 Summer Olympics in Barcelona, and in women's singles and women's doubles at the 1996 Summer Olympics in Atlanta.
