= 1992 All England Open Badminton Championships =

1992 All England Championships
Tournament details
- Dates: 11 March 1992– 15 March 1992
- Edition: 82nd
- Venue: Wembley Arena
- Location: London

The 1992 Yonex All England Open was the 82nd edition of the All England Open Badminton Championships. It was held from March 11 to March 15, 1992, in London, England.

It was a five-star tournament and the prize money was US$125,000.

== Venue ==
- Wembley Arena

== Final results ==
Category	Winners	Runners-up	Score
Men's singles	(China) Liu Jun	(China) Zhao Jianhua	15–13, 15–13
Women's singles	(China) Tang Jiuhong	(South Korea) Bang Soo-hyun	9–12, 12–10, 11–1
Men's doubles	(Indonesia) Eddy Hartono & Rudy Gunawan	(Denmark) Jan Paulsen & Henrik Svarrer	15–10, 15–12
Women's Doubles	(China) Yao Fen & Lin Yanfen	(China) Guan Weizhen & Nong Qunhua	18–14, 18–17
Mixed doubles	(Denmark) Thomas Lund & Pernille Dupont	(Denmark) Jon Holst-Christensen & Grete Mogensen	15–10, 15–1

== Men's singles ==
=== Section 1 ===
Round of 32
(China) Liu Jun	15	15
(Denmark) Kent Waede Hansen	11	1
(Indonesia) Ardy B. Wiranata	15	15
(Canada) David Humble	3	4
(Denmark) Thomas Stuer-Lauridsen	15	15
(India) Rajeev Bagga	9	5
(South Korea) Park Sung-woo	15	15
(England) Steffan Pandya	11	1
(China) Wu Wenkai	15	15
(Malaysia) Wong Tat Meng	4	12
(Indonesia) Fung Permadi	15	15
(England) Darren Hall	5	12
(South Korea) Lee Gwang-jin	7	15	15
(Finland) Pontus Jäntti	15	4	13
(Indonesia) Bambang Suprianto	15	15
(Netherlands) Jeroen van Dijk	13	5

Round of 16
(China) Liu Jun	15	15
(Indonesia) Wiranata	10	8
(Denmark) Stuer-Lauridsen	8	15	15
(South Korea) Sung-woo	15	7	5
(China) Wu Wenkai	15	15
(Indonesia) Permadi	3	2
(South Korea) Gwang-jin	15	18
(Indonesia) Suprianto	5	13

Quarter-finals
(China) Liu Jun	15	15
(Denmark) Stuer-Lauridsen	10	7
(China) Wu Wenkai	15	15
(South Korea) Gwang-jin	9	12

Semi-finals
(China) Liu Jun	12	15	15
(China) Wu Wenkai	15	2	4

=== Section 2 ===
Round of 32
(China) Zhao Jianhua	12	15	15
(Canada) Bryan Blanshard	15	10	2
(Denmark) Michael Søgaard	15	18
(Netherlands) Pierre Pelupessy	8	13
(Indonesia) Hermawan Susanto	15	15
(Denmark) Claus Thomsen	0	7
(South Korea) Ahn Jae-chang	15	9	15
(Sweden) Jens Olsson	11	15	7
(Indonesia) Alan Budikusuma	15	15
(South Korea) Kim Hak-kyun	11	9
(Finland) Robert Liljequist	15	15
(India) Deepankar Bhattacharya	8	10
(England) Anders Nielsen	8	15	15
(Indonesia) Joko Suprianto	15	8	8
(Russia) Andrey Antropov	15	15
(Japan) Hideaki Motoyama	12	6

Round of 16
(China) Jianhua	15	15
(Denmark) Søgaard	11	11
(Indonesia) Susanto	15	15
(South Korea) Ahn	4	7
(Indonesia) Kusuma	15	15
(Finland) Liljequist	2	9
(England) Nielsen	7	15	15
(Russia) Antropov	15	5	2

Quarter-finals
(China) Jianhua	5	15	15
(Indonesia) Susanto	15	4	3
(Indonesia) Kusuma	15	15
(England) Nielsen	1	11

Semi-finals
(China) Jianhua	15	15
(Indonesia) Kusuma	12	10

== Women's singles ==
=== Section 1 ===
Round of 32
(China) Tang Jiuhong	11	11
(Sweden) Catrine Bengtsson	5	5
(Netherlands) Astrid van der Knaap	11	11
(Denmark) Helle Andersen	6	4
(South Korea) Lee Heung-soon	11	3	11
(China) Liu Yuhong	6	11	1
(England) Joanne Muggeridge	11	11
(Scotland) Anne Gibson	2	8
(China) Ye Zhaoying	11	11
(England) Fiona Smith	1	5
(Indonesia) Susi Susanti	11	11
(Japan) Aiko Miyamura	7	4
(South Korea) Park Soo-yun	11	11
(England) Tanya Woodward	2	0
(Denmark) Camilla Martin	11	11
(Netherlands) Erica van den Heuvel	4	4

Round of 16
(China) Jiuhong	11	11
(Netherlands) van der Knaap	1	7
(South Korea) Heung-soon	17	11	11
(England) Muggeridge	11	4	2
(China) Zhaoying	5	11	11
(Indonesia) Susanti	11	5	5
(South Korea) Soo Yun	11	8	11
(Denmark) Martin	8	11	4

Quarter-finals
(China) Jiuhong	7	11	11
(South Korea) Heung-soon	11	3	4
(China) Zhaoying	11	11
(South Korea) Soo Yun	5	6

Semi-finals
(China) Jiuhong	12	9	11
(China) Zhaoying	10	12	1

=== Section 2 ===
Round of 32
(South Korea) Bang Soo-Hyun	11	11
(England) Tracy Dineen	5	1
(England) Julie Bradbury	11	11
(Denmark) Gitte Sommer	3	7
(Indonesia) Sarwendah Kusumawardhani	11	11
(Sweden) Astrid Crabo	5	6
(China) Liao Zhiqun	11	12
(Canada) Doris Piche	8	10
(China) Huang Hua	12	11
(South Korea) Park Jin-hyun	9	1
(Russia) Elena Rybkina	8	11	11
(Indonesia) Yuliani Sentosa	11	7	8
(Denmark) Pernille Nedergaard	11	11
(Denmark) Helene Kirkegaard	5	3
(Japan) Hisako Mizui	w/o
(Netherlands) Eline Coene	scr

Round of 16
(South Korea) Soo-Hyun	11	11
(England) Bradbury	3	7
(Indonesia) Kusumawardhani	12	10	11
(China) Liao Zhiqun	9	12	9
(China) Huang Hua	11	12
(Russia) Rybkina	8	10
(Denmark) Nedergaard	12	11
(Japan) Mizui	10	7

Quarter-finals
(South Korea) Soo-Hyun	11	11
(Indonesia) Kusumawardhani	6	1
(China) Huang Hua	11	11
(Denmark) Nedergaard	5	5

Semi-finals
(South Korea) Soo-Hyun	11	0	11
(China) Huang Hua	7	11	5
