= 1993 All England Open Badminton Championships =

1993 All England Championships
Tournament details
- Dates: 17 March 1993– 21 March 1993
- Edition: 83rd
- Venue: Wembley Arena
- Location: London

The 1993 Yonex All England Open was the 83rd edition of the All England Open Badminton Championships. It was held from March 17 to March 21, 1993, in London, England.

It was a five-star tournament and the prize money was US$125,000.

== Venue ==
- Wembley Arena

== Final results ==
Category	Winners	Runners-up	Score
Men's Singles	(Indonesia) Hariyanto Arbi	(Indonesia) Joko Suprianto	15–7, 4–15, 15–11
Women's singles	(Indonesia) Susi Susanti	(South Korea) Bang Soo-hyun	4–11, 11–4, 11–1
Men's doubles	(Denmark) Thomas Lund & Jon Holst-Christensen	(China) Chen Kang & Chen Hongyong	10–15, 15–2, 15–10
Women's doubles	(South Korea) Chung So-young & Gil Young-ah	(China) Yao Fen & Lin Yanfen	5–15, 15–4, 15–7
Mixed doubles	(Denmark) Jon Holst-Christensen & Grete Mogensen	(Denmark) Thomas Lund & (Sweden) Catrine Bengtsson	8–1, retired

== Men's singles ==
=== Section 1 ===
Round of 32
(Indonesia) Hariyanto Arbi	15	15
(China) Hu Zhilan	10	5
(England) Darren Hall	6	15	15
(Denmark) Martin Lundgaard Hansen	15	6	2
(Malaysia) Rashid Sidek	15	15
(Finland) Pontus Jäntti	10	2
(Sweden) Jens Olsson	15	15
(Denmark) Kent Waede Hansen	13	3
(Denmark) Thomas Stuer-Lauridsen	15	15
(Russia) Andrey Antropov	2	1
(Indonesia) Fung Permadi	15	15
(Sweden) Jorgen Tuvesson	10	13
(Indonesia) Ardy B. Wiranata	15	15
(China) Dong Jiong	11	6
(South Korea) Kim Hak-kyun	14	15	15
(England) Peter Knowles	17	0	10

Round of 16
(Indonesia) Arbi	15	15
(England) Hall	11	9
(Malaysia) Sidek	15	15
(Sweden) Olsson	13	3
(Denmark) Stuer-Lauridsen	15	17
(Indonesia) Permadi	4	14
(Indonesia) Wiranata	18	15
(South Korea) Hak-kyun	15	8

Quarter-finals
(Indonesia) Arbi	15	15
(Malaysia) Sidek	6	7
(Denmark) Stuer-Lauridsen	15	9	15
(Indonesia) Wiranata	4	15	3

Semi-finals
(Indonesia) Arbi	18	15
(Denmark) Stuer-Lauridsen	17	12

=== Section 2 ===
Round of 32
(Indonesia) Joko Suprianto	15	15
(England) Steve Butler	6	1
(Sweden) Patrik Andreasson	15	15	12
(Thailand) Sompol Kukasemkij	7	18	9ret
(Denmark) Poul-Erik Høyer Larsen	15	15
(Germany) Oliver Pongratz	5	8
(South Korea) Park Sung-woo	15	15
(China) Ge Cheng	6	1
(Malaysia) Foo Kok Keong	15	6	15
(England) Anders Nielsen	10	15	9
(Indonesia) Alan Budikusuma	15	15
(Netherlands) Chris Bruil	11	6
(China) Liu Jun	15	15
(India) Pullela Gopichand	1	3
(Indonesia) Hermawan Susanto	15	18
(Denmark) Peter Rasmussen	10	17

Round of 16
(Indonesia) Suprianto	15	15
(Sweden) Andreasson	2	4
(Denmark) Høyer Larsen	15	18
(South Korea) Sung-woo	8	16
(Malaysia) Keong	18	15
(Indonesia) Kusuma	14	8
(China) Liu Jun	15	15
(Indonesia) Susanto	3	5

Quarter-finals
(Indonesia) Suprianto	15	7	15
(Denmark) Høyer Larsen	8	15	6
(Malaysia) Keong	15	15
(China) Liu Jun	8	3

Semi-finals
(Indonesia) Suprianto	15	15
(Malaysia) Keong	7	11

== Women's singles ==
=== Section 1 ===
Round of 32
(Indonesia) Susi Susanti	11	11
(Canada) Denyse Julien	7	5
(Sweden) Christine Magnusson	12	12
(South Korea) Chung Eun Hwa	10	10
(England) Fiona Smith	11	11
(Denmark) Maiken Mork	2	4
(Denmark) Tanja Berg	w/o
(Thailand) Pornsawan Plungwech	scr
(China) Ye Zhaoying	11	11
(Indonesia) Yuliani Sentosa	8	4
(Indonesia) Zarinah Abdullah	11	11
(Sweden) Astrid Crabo	8	3
(South Korea) Lee Heung-soon	11	11
(England) Nicola Jordan	5	3
(Denmark) Camilla Martin	11	11
(China) Hu Ning	7	5

Round of 16
(Indonesia) Susanti	11	12
(Sweden) Magnusson	8	11
(England) Smith	15	15
(Denmark) Berg	8	8
(China) Zhaoying	11	11
(Indonesia) Abdullah	0	1
(South Korea) Heung-soon	11	11
(Denmark) Martin	6	1

Quarter-finals
(Indonesia) Susanti	11	11
(England) Smith	5	3
(China) Zhaoying	11	11
(South Korea) Heung Soon	8	5

Semi-finals
(Indonesia) Susanti	11	11
(China) Zhaoying	1	6

=== Section 2 ===
Round of 32
(South Korea) Bang Soo-hyun	11	11
(Denmark) Gitte Sommer	1	2
(Malaysia) Liu Yuhong	12	12
(England) Tracy Dineen	9	11
(Indonesia) Sarwendah Kusumawardhani	8	11	11
(Netherlands) Monique Hoogland	11	1	5
(China) Yao Yan	12	12
(Japan) Aiko Miyamura	9	10
(China) Tang Jiuhong	11	11
(Denmark) Lisbet Stuer-Lauridsen	3	4
(Indonesia) Minarti Timur	11	11
(Russia) Marina Andrievskaya	5	4
(Sweden) Lim Xiaoqing	12	11
(South Korea) Ra Kyung-min	11	5
(Thailand) Somharuthai Jaroensiri	11	11
(Germany) Heidi Dossing-Eiber	1	5

Round of 16
(South Korea) Soo-Hyun	12	11
(Malaysia) Liu Yuhong	10	4
(Indonesia) Kusumawardhani	11	11
(China) Yao Yan	3	6
(China) Jiuhong	11	11
(Indonesia) Timur	5	4
(Sweden) Lim Xiaoqing	7	11	11
(Thailand) Jaroensiri	11	4	2

Quarter-finals
(South Korea) Soo-Hyun	11	8	11
(Indonesia) Kusumawardhani	8	11	4
(China) Jiuhong	11	11
(Sweden) Lim Xiaoqing	8	2

Semi-finals
(South Korea) Soo-Hyun	11	11
(China) Jiuhong	7	8
