= 1988 European Badminton Championships =

Tournament details
- Dates: 10–16 April
- Edition: 11
- Venue: Badmintonsenteret
- Location: Kristiansand, Norway

The 11th European Badminton Championships were held in Kristiansand, Norway, between 10 and 16 April 1988, and hosted by the European Badminton Union and the Norges Badminton Forbund.

== Medalists ==
Event	Gold	Silver	Bronze
Men's singles	(England) Darren Hall	(Denmark) Morten Frost	(Soviet Union) Andrey Antropov
Men's singles	(England) Darren Hall	(Denmark) Morten Frost	(Denmark) Michael Kjeldsen
Women's singles	(Denmark) Kirsten Larsen	(Denmark) Christina Bostofte	(Netherlands) Eline Coene
Women's singles	(Denmark) Kirsten Larsen	(Denmark) Christina Bostofte	(Sweden) Christine Magnusson
Men's doubles	(Denmark) Jens Peter Nierhoff and Michael Kjeldsen	(Denmark) Steen Fladberg and Jan Paulsen	(Wales) Chris Rees and Lyndon Williams
Men's doubles	(Denmark) Jens Peter Nierhoff and Michael Kjeldsen	(Denmark) Steen Fladberg and Jan Paulsen	(Sweden) Peter Axelsson and Stefan Karlsson
Women's doubles	(Denmark) Dorte Kjær and Nettie Nielsen	(England) Julie Munday and Gillian Clark	(Sweden) Maria Bengtsson and Christine Magnusson
Women's doubles	(Denmark) Dorte Kjær and Nettie Nielsen	(England) Julie Munday and Gillian Clark	(West Germany) Katrin Schmidt and Kirsten Schmieder
Mixed doubles	(Denmark) Steen Fladberg and (England) Gillian Clark	(Netherlands) Alex Meijer and Erica van Dijck	(Denmark) Henrik Svarrer and Dorte Kjær
Mixed doubles	(Denmark) Steen Fladberg and (England) Gillian Clark	(Netherlands) Alex Meijer and Erica van Dijck	(Sweden) Jan-Eric Antonsson and Maria Bengtsson
Teams	(Denmark) Denmark; Steen Fladberg; Morten Frost; Michael Kjeldsen; Jens Peter Nierhoff; Jan Paulsen; Henrik Svarrer; Christina Bostofte; Dorte Kjær; Kirsten Larsen; Grete Mogensen; Nettie Nielsen; Gitte Paulsen	(Sweden) Sweden; Jan-Eric Antonsson; Peter Axelsson; Pär-Gunnar Jönsson; Jens Olsson; Stefan Karlsson; Catrine Bengtsson; Maria Bengtsson; Christine Magnusson	(England) England; Steve Baddeley; Martin Dew; Andy Goode; Darren Hall; Nick Yates; Gillian Clark; Fiona Elliot; Gillian Gilks; Julie Munday; Sara Sankey; Helen Troke

== Results ==
=== Semi-finals ===
Category	Winner	Runner-up	Score
Men's singles	(Denmark) Morten Frost	(Soviet Union) Andrey Antropov	15–3, 15–2
Men's singles	(England) Darren Hall	(Denmark) Michael Kjeldsen	15–6, 15–18, 15–2
Women's singles	(Denmark) Kirsten Larsen	(Netherlands) Eline Coene	11–4, 3–11, 12–11
Women's singles	(Denmark) Christina Bostofte	(Sweden) Christine Magnusson	11–5, 11–2
Men's doubles	(Denmark) Jens Peter Nierhoff (Denmark) Michael Kjeldsen	(Wales) Chris Rees (Wales) Lyndon Williams	15–8, 15–7
Men's doubles	(Denmark) Jan Paulsen (Denmark) Steen Fladberg	(Sweden) Peter Axelsson (Sweden) Stefan Karlsson	15–10, 7–15, 15–10
Women's doubles	(England) Gillian Clark (England) Julie Munday	(West Germany) Katrin Schmidt (West Germany) Kirsten Schmieder	15–8, 5–15, 15–7
Women's doubles	(Denmark) Dorte Kjær (Denmark) Nettie Nielsen	(Sweden) Christine Magnusson (Sweden) Maria Bengtsson	15–8, 15–9
Mixed doubles	(Denmark) Steen Fladberg (England) Gillian Clark	(Denmark) Henrik Svarrer (Denmark) Dorte Kjær	18–15, 15–10
Mixed doubles	(Netherlands) Alex Meijer (Netherlands) Erica van Dijck	(Sweden) Jan-Eric Antonsson (Sweden) Maria Bengtsson	10–15, 15–11, 15–10

=== Finals ===
Category	Winners	Runners-up	Score
Men's singles	(England) Darren Hall	(Denmark) Morten Frost	8–15, 15–12, 15–9
Women's singles	(Denmark) Kirsten Larsen	(Denmark) Christina Bostofte	11–8, 11–2
Men's doubles	(Denmark) Jens Peter Nierhoff (Denmark) Michael Kjeldsen	(Denmark) Jan Paulsen (Denmark) Steen Fladberg	15–9, 15–11
Women's doubles	(Denmark) Dorte Kjær (Denmark) Nettie Nielsen	(England) Gillian Clark (England) Julie Munday	15–7, 15–4
Mixed doubles	(Denmark) Steen Fladberg (England) Gillian Clark	(Netherlands) Alex Meijer (Netherlands) Erica van Dijck	17–16, 4–15, 15–10

== Medal account ==
* Host nation (Norway)

Rank	Nation	Gold	Silver	Bronze	Total
1	Denmark	4.5	3	2	9.5
2	England	1.5	1	1	3.5
3	Sweden	0	1	4	5
4	Netherlands	0	1	1	2
5	Soviet Union	0	0	1	1
5	Wales	0	0	1	1
5	West Germany	0	0	1	1
Totals (7 entries)		6	6	11	23
