= 1991 IBF World Championships – Mixed doubles =

Badminton championships

Mixed doubles at the 1991 IBF World Championships
- Venue: Brøndby Arena
- Location: Copenhagen, Denmark
- Dates: May 2, 1991 – May 8, 1991

Medalists
| gold medal | Park Joo-bong; Chung Myung-hee | South Korea |
| silver medal | Thomas Lund; Pernille Dupont | Denmark |
| bronze medal | Jon Holst-Christensen; Grete Mogensen | Denmark |
| bronze medal | Kang Kyung-jin; Shim Eun-jung | South Korea |

The 1991 IBF World Championships (World Badminton Championships) were held in Copenhagen, Denmark in 1991. Following the results of the mixed doubles.

== Main stage ==
=== Section 1 ===
First round
(South Korea) Park Joo-bong (South Korea) Chung Myung-hee | 15 | 15
(Bulgaria) Jasen Borisov (Bulgaria) Neli Boteva | 1 | 3
(Norway) Trond Waaland (Norway) Camilla Wright | 15 | 15
(Mauritius) Eddy Clarisse (Mauritius) Vandanah Seesurun | 2 | 4
(China) Liu Jianjun (China) Wu Pei | 13 | 18 | 15
(England) Dave Wright (England) Cheryl Johnson | 15 | 17 | 10
(Australia) Paul Stevenson (Australia) Rhonda Cator | 15 | 17
(Chinese Taipei) Horng Shin-Jeng (Chinese Taipei) Lee Chien-Mei | 5 | 14
(Sweden) Jan-Eric Antonsson (Sweden) Christine Gandrup | 15 | 15
(Czechoslovakia) Zdenek Musil (Czechoslovakia) Jitka Lacinová | 6 | 10
(Scotland) Kevin Scott (Scotland) Gillian Martin | 17 | 10 | 15
(Finland) Peter Serlachius (Finland) Nina Koho | 14 | 15 | 7
(Indonesia) Ricky Subagja (Indonesia) Eliza Nathanael | w.o.
(Pakistan) Mirza Ali Yar Beg (Pakistan) Ghazala Wadood
(Germany) Michael Keck (Germany) Anne-Katrin Seid | 15 | 15
(New Zealand) Glenn Stewart (New Zealand) Rhona Robertson | 2 | 8

Second round
(South Korea) Park Joo-bong (South Korea) Chung Myung-hee | 15 | 15
(Norway) Trond Waaland (Norway) Camilla Wright | 4 | 2
(China) Liu Jianjun (China) Wu Pei | 15 | 18
(Australia) Paul Stevenson (Australia) Rhonda Cator | 5 | 16
(Sweden) Jan-Eric Antonsson (Sweden) Christine Gandrup | 15 | 15
(Scotland) Kevin Scott (Scotland) Gillian Martin | 10 | 0
(Indonesia) Ricky Subagja (Indonesia) Eliza Nathanael | 15 | 10 | 17
(Germany) Michael Keck (Germany) Anne-Katrin Seid | 9 | 15 | 16

Third round
(South Korea) Park Joo-bong (South Korea) Chung Myung-hee | 15 | 15
(China) Liu Jianjun (China) Wu Pei | 3 | 2
(Sweden) Jan-Eric Antonsson (Sweden) Christine Gandrup | 15 | 15
(Indonesia) Ricky Subagja (Indonesia) Eliza Nathanael | 9 | 8

Quarterfinals
(South Korea) Park Joo-bong (South Korea) Chung Myung-hee | 15 | 15
(Sweden) Jan-Eric Antonsson (Sweden) Christine Gandrup | 5 | 7

=== Section 2 ===
First round
(Denmark) Jon Holst-Christensen (Denmark) Grete Mogensen | 15 | 15
(France) Stephane Renault (France) Elodie Mansuy | 4 | 3
(Switzerland) Hubert Müller (Belgium) Silvia Albrecht | 15 | 18
(Poland) Damian Plawecki (Poland) Sylwia Rutkiewicz | 11 | 13
(South Korea) Shon Jin-hwan (South Korea) Gil Young-ah | 15 | 15
(Scotland) Kenny Middlemiss (Scotland) Elinor Middlemiss | 4 | 2
(Thailand) Piyathip Sansaniyakulvilai (Thailand) Pramote Teerawiwatana | 18 | 15
(Austria) Harald Koch (Austria) Brigitte Langthaler | 13 | 4
(Denmark) Jan Paulsen (England) Gillian Gowers | 15 | 18
(Chinese Taipei) Lee Mou-Chou (Chinese Taipei) Feng Mei-Ying | 6 | 17
(Germany) Kai Mitteldorf (Netherlands) Sonja Mellink | 15 | 15
(New Zealand) Nick Hall (New Zealand) Sheree Jefferson | 9 | 4
(Denmark) Jesper Knudsen (Netherlands) Erica van den Heuvel | 15 | 15
(Soviet Union) Nikolaj Zuev (Soviet Union) Irina Serova | 9 | 8
(Canada) Andrew Muir (Canada) Claire Backhouse | 15 | 15
(Finland) Lasse Lindelöf (Finland) Sara Ussher | 4 | 6

Second round
(Denmark) Jon Holst-Christensen (Denmark) Grete Mogensen | 15 | 15
(Switzerland) Hubert Müller (Belgium) Silvia Albrecht | 2 | 5
(South Korea) Shon Jin-hwan (South Korea) Gil Young-ah | 15 | 15
(Thailand) Piyathip Sansaniyakulvilai (Thailand) Pramote Teerawiwatana | 10 | 10
(Denmark) Jan Paulsen (England) Gillian Gowers | 15 | 15
(Germany) Kai Mitteldorf (Netherlands) Sonja Mellink | 10 | 6
(Denmark) Jesper Knudsen (Netherlands) Erica van den Heuvel | 15 | 15
(Canada) Andrew Muir (Canada) Claire Backhouse | 1 | 7

Third round
(Denmark) Jon Holst-Christensen (Denmark) Grete Mogensen | 15 | 6 | 15
(South Korea) Shon Jin-hwan (South Korea) Gil Young-ah | 8 | 15 | 11
(Denmark) Jan Paulsen (England) Gillian Gowers | 15 | 15
(Denmark) Jesper Knudsen (Netherlands) Erica van den Heuvel | 9 | 8

Quarterfinals
(Denmark) Jon Holst-Christensen (Denmark) Grete Mogensen | 15 | 5 | 18
(Denmark) Jan Paulsen (England) Gillian Gowers | 8 | 15 | 17

=== Section 3 ===
First round
(Denmark) Thomas Lund (Denmark) Pernille Dupont
bye
(Republic of Ireland) Graham Henderson (Republic of Ireland) Jayne Plunkett | 15 | 15
(Grenada) Stephenson Sylvester (Grenada) Christine Charles | 3 | 5
(China) Lin Yanfen (China) Yu Yong | 15 | 9 | 15
(Sweden) Rikard Magnusson (Sweden) Astrid Crabo | 5 | 15 | 11
(France) Etienne Thobois (France) Sandra Dimbour | 15 | 15
(Romania) Florin Balaban (Italy) Erika Henriete Stich | 6 | 3
(South Korea) Lee Sang-bok (South Korea) Chung So-young | 15 | 15
(Greece) Pavlos Charalambidis (Scotland) Anne Gibson | 7 | 1
(England) Nick Ponting (England) Joanne Muggeridge | 15 | 15
(Hong Kong) Ng Pak Kum (Hong Kong) Chung Hoi Yuk | 10 | 9
(Denmark) Max Gandrup (England) Gillian Clark | 13 | 15 | 15
(Australia) Peter Blackburn (Australia) Lisa Campbell | 18 | 5 | 5
(Spain) David Serrano (Spain) Cristina González | 15 | 15
(Mexico) Fernando de la Torre (Mexico) Maria de la Paz | 12 | 7

Second round
(Denmark) Thomas Lund (Denmark) Pernille Dupont | 15 | 15
(Republic of Ireland) Graham Henderson (Republic of Ireland) Jayne Plunkett | 2 | 6
(China) Lin Yanfen (China) Yu Yong | 15 | 15
(France) Etienne Thobois (France) Sandra Dimbour | 1 | 9
(South Korea) Lee Sang-bok (South Korea) Chung So-young | 15 | 15
(England) Nick Ponting (England) Joanne Muggeridge | 3 | 12
(Denmark) Max Gandrup (England) Gillian Clark | 15 | 15
(Spain) David Serrano (Spain) Cristina González | 3 | 2

Third round
(Denmark) Thomas Lund (Denmark) Pernille Dupont | 14 | 18 | 15
(China) Lin Yanfen (China) Yu Yong | 17 | 8
(South Korea) Lee Sang-bok (South Korea) Chung So-young | 17 | 13 | 15
(Denmark) Max Gandrup (England) Gillian Clark | 16 | 18 | 11

Quarterfinals
(Denmark) Thomas Lund (Denmark) Pernille Dupont | 15 | 18
(South Korea) Lee Sang-bok (South Korea) Chung So-young | 6 | 14

=== Section 4 ===
First round
(South Korea) Kang Kyung-jin (South Korea) Shim Eun-jung | w.o.
(Australia) Darren McDonald (Australia) Anna Oi Chan Lao
(Denmark) Henrik Svarrer (Denmark) Marlene Thomsen | 15 | 15
(Netherlands) Alex Meijer (Netherlands) Nicole van Hooren | 9 | 5
(Thailand) Siripong Siripool (Thailand) Ladawan Mulasartsatorn | 15 | 15
(New Zealand) Dean Galt (New Zealand) Julie Still | 1 | 6
(Chinese Taipei) Kang Chia-I (Chinese Taipei) Liu En-Horng | 15 | 15
(Finland) Mika Heinonen (Finland) Ulrica von Pfaler | 3 | 8
(Sweden) Pär-Gunnar Jönsson (Sweden) Maria Bengtsson | 15 | 15
(Spain) Antonio Miranda (Spain) Esther Sanz | 2 | 4
(Soviet Union) Vitali Shmakov (Soviet Union) Vlada Tcherniavskaia | 11 | 15 | 18
(Germany) Robert Neumann (Germany) Nicole Baldewein | 13 | 14
(Canada) Anil Kaul (Canada) Si-An Deng | 18 | 15
(Iceland) Gudmundur Adolfsson (Iceland) Asa Palsdottir | 13 | 4
(England) Andy Brian Goode (England) Sara Sankey | 15 | 13 | 15
(Poland) Jerzy Dolhan (Poland) Bozena Haracz | 11 | 15 | 12

Second round
(South Korea) Kang Kyung-jin (South Korea) Shim Eun-jung | 14 | 18 | 15
(Denmark) Henrik Svarrer (Denmark) Marlene Thomsen | 17 | 13 | 2
(Thailand) Siripong Siripool (Thailand) Ladawan Mulasartsatorn | 15 | 15
(Chinese Taipei) Kang Chia-I (Chinese Taipei) Liu En-Horng | 11 | 12
(Sweden) Pär-Gunnar Jönsson (Sweden) Maria Bengtsson | 15 | 15
(Soviet Union) Vitali Shmakov (Soviet Union) Vlada Tcherniavskaia | 5 | 7
(Canada) Anil Kaul (Canada) Si-An Deng | 15 | 4 | 15
(England) Andy Brian Goode (England) Sara Sankey | 7 | 15 | 9

Third round
(South Korea) Kang Kyung-jin (South Korea) Shim Eun-jung | 15 | 15
(Thailand) Siripong Siripool (Thailand) Ladawan Mulasartsatorn | 11 | 2
(Sweden) Pär-Gunnar Jönsson (Sweden) Maria Bengtsson | 15 | 15
(Canada) Anil Kaul (Canada) Si-An Deng | 11 | 4

Quarterfinals
(South Korea) Kang Kyung-jin (South Korea) Shim Eun-jung | w.o.
(Sweden) Pär-Gunnar Jönsson (Sweden) Maria Bengtsson

== Final stage ==
Quarterfinals
(South Korea) Park Joo-bong (South Korea) Chung Myung-hee | 15 | 15
(Sweden) Jan-Eric Antonsson (Sweden) Christine Gandrup | 5 | 7
(Denmark) Jon Holst-Christensen (Denmark) Grete Mogensen | 15 | 5 | 18
(Denmark) Jan Paulsen (England) Gillian Gowers | 8 | 15 | 17
(Denmark) Thomas Lund (Denmark) Pernille Dupont | 15 | 18
(South Korea) Lee Sang-bok (South Korea) Chung So-young | 6 | 14
(South Korea) Kang Kyung-jin (South Korea) Shim Eun-jung | w.o.
(Sweden) Pär-Gunnar Jönsson (Sweden) Maria Bengtsson

Semifinals
(South Korea) Park Joo-bong (South Korea) Chung Myung-hee | 17 | 18
(Denmark) Jon Holst-Christensen (Denmark) Grete Mogensen | 15 | 16
(Denmark) Thomas Lund (Denmark) Pernille Dupont | 15 | 15 | 15
(South Korea) Kang Kyung-jin (South Korea) Shim Eun-jung | 7 | 17 | 7

Finals
(South Korea) Park Joo-bong (South Korea) Chung Myung-hee | 15 | 15 | 15
(Denmark) Thomas Lund (Denmark) Pernille Dupont | 5 | 17 | 9
