= 1989 All England Open Badminton Championships =

1989 All England Championships
Tournament details
- Dates: 15 March 1989– 19 March 1989
- Edition: 79th
- Venue: Wembley Arena
- Location: London

The 1989 Yonex All England Open Championships was the 79th edition held in 1989, at Wembley Arena, London. In the men's singles defending champion Ib Frederiksen was eliminated in the first round.

== Final results ==
Category	Winners	Runners-up	Score
Men's singles	(China) Yang Yang	(Denmark) Morten Frost	15–6, 15–7
Women's singles	(China) Li Lingwei	(Indonesia) Susi Susanti	11–8, 11–4
Men's doubles	(South Korea) Lee Sang-bok & Park Joo-bong	(Indonesia) Rudy Gunawan & Eddy Hartono	15–8, 15–7
Women's doubles	(South Korea) Chung Myung-hee & Chung So-young	(China) Sun Xiaoqing & Zhou Lei	15–7, 15–4
Mixed doubles	(South Korea) Park Joo-bong & Chung Myung-hee	(Sweden) Jan-Eric Antonsson & Maria Bengtsson	15–1, 15–9

== Men's singles ==
=== Seeds ===
1. (China) Yang Yang
2. (Denmark) Morten Frost
3. (China) Xiong Guobao - eliminated in first round
4. (Indonesia) Icuk Sugiarto
5. (Denmark) Poul-Erik Høyer Larsen
6. (Denmark) Jens Peter Nierhoff
7. (Indonesia) Eddy Kurniawan
8. (Malaysia) Foo Kok Keong - eliminated in first round

=== Section 1 ===
Round of 32
(China) Yang Yang	15	15
(Hong Kong) Yeung Yik Kei	7	6
(England) Anders Nielsen	18	18
(Denmark) Michael Kjeldsen	15	14
(Indonesia) Alan Budikusuma	15	15
(Denmark) Søren B. Nielsen	4	8
(England) Nick Yates	15	15
(Sweden) Patrik Andreasson	7	8
(Denmark) Poul-Erik Høyer Larsen	15	17
(Finland) Pontus Jäntti	8	14
(India) Vimal Kumar	12	15	15
(South Korea) Lee Kwang-jin	15	8	8
(England) Darren Hall	15	13	15
(Thailand) Sompol Kukasemkij	8	15	7
(Indonesia) Icuk Sugiarto	15	15
(Norway) Hans Sperre jr.	2	7

Round of 16
(China) Yang Yang	15	15
(England) Nielsen	10	9
(Indonesia) Kusuma	15	15
(England) Yates	5	3
(Denmark) Høyer Larsen	15	15
(India) Kumar	11	9
(England) Hall	15	3	15
(Indonesia) Sugiarto	10	15	3

Quarter-finals
(China) Yang Yang	15	15
(Indonesia) Kusuma	9	5
(Denmark) Høyer Larsen	15	17	17
(England) Hall	2	18	14

Semi-finals
(China) Yang Yang	15	18
(Denmark) Høyer Larsen	4	13

=== Section 2 ===
Round of 32
(Denmark) Morten Frost	15	15
(United States) Chris Jogis	6	1
(Denmark) Michael Søgaard	3	15	15
(England) Mike Adams	15	7	3
(Indonesia) Eddy Kurniawan	10	17	15
(England) Steve Butler	15	15	8
(China) Wu Wenkai	15	15
(Japan) Shuji Matsuno	7	12
(Indonesia) Ardy Wiranata	15	15
(South Korea) Ahn Jae-chang	5	5
(Denmark) Jens Peter Nierhoff	15	15
(Denmark) Peter Espersen	6	0
(England) Steve Baddeley	15	15
(Japan) Hiroki Etō	6	4
(Denmark) Claus Overbeck	6	15	15
(Denmark) Torben Carlsen	15	6	9

Round of 16
(Denmark) Frost	15	15
(Denmark) Søgaard	8	9
(Indonesia) Kurniawan	15	4	15
(China) Wenkai	8	15	4
(Indonesia) Wiranata	15	15
(Denmark) Nierhoff	9	4
(England) Baddeley	15	15
(Denmark) Overbeck	13	7

Quarter-finals
(Denmark) Frost	15	15
(Indonesia) Kurniawan	8	8
(Indonesia) Wiranata	15	10	15
(England) Baddeley	5	15	11

Semi-finals
(Denmark) Frost	15	15
(Indonesia) Wiranata	5	7

== Women's singles ==
=== Seeds ===
1. (China) Li Lingwei
2. (South Korea) Hwang Hye-young
3. (China) Sun Xiaoqing
4. (South Korea) Lee Young-suk
5. (China) Shang Funmei
6. (Indonesia) Susi Susanti
7. (Sweden) Christine Magnusson
8. (Denmark) Kirsten Larsen

=== Section 1 ===
Round of 32
(China) Li Lingwei	11	11
(West Germany) Katrin Schmidt	5	3
(Netherlands) Eline Coene	8	11	11
(England) Sue Louis	11	7	0
(Denmark) Kirsten Larsen	11	11
(England) Sarah Hore	2	7
(Japan) Aiko Miyamura	11	11
(India) Madhumita Bisht	5	2
(South Korea) Lee Young-suk	11	11
(Denmark) Helene Kirkegaard	5	2
(China) Zhou Lei	6	11	11
(England) Fiona Smith	11	7	8
(Denmark) Charlotte Hattens	12	11
(China) Shang Fumei	10	6
(Japan) Kimiko Jinnai	11	11
(Sweden) Charlotta Wihlborg	3	8

Round of 16
(China) Li	11	11
(Netherlands) Coene	7	7
(Denmark) Larsen	12	11
(Japan) Miyamura	9	3
(South Korea) Lee	12	11
(China) Zhou	9	7
(Denmark) Hattens	1	11	11
(Japan) Jinnai	11	5	2

Quarter-finals
(China) Li	11	11
(Denmark) Larsen	3	0
(South Korea) Lee	11	11
(Denmark) Hattens	2	2

Semi-finals
(China) Li	10	11	11
(South Korea) Lee	12	7	2

=== Section 2 ===
Round of 32
(Indonesia) Susi Susanti	3	11	11
(South Korea) Lee Jung-mi	11	3	6
(England) Julie Munday	11	11
(Japan) Takako Shinki	2	5
(Denmark) Pernille Nedergaard	11	12
(England) Joanne Muggeridge	0	9
(China) Sun Xiaoqing	11	11
(Japan) Hisako Mizui	1	1
(South Korea) Hwang Hye-young	11	11
(Hong Kong) Chan Man Wa	5	1
(England) Helen Troke	11	11
(Canada) Denyse Julien	4	1
(Netherlands) Astrid van der Knaap	11	11
(England) Sara Sankey	7	2
(Japan) Harumi Kohara	w/o
(Sweden) Christine Magnusson	scr

Round of 16
(Indonesia) Susanti	11	11
(England) Munday	4	5
(Denmark) Nedegaard	11	11
(China) Sun	4	8
(South Korea) Hwang	12	6	11
(England) Troke	10	11	7
(Netherlands) Van der Knapp	11	11
(Japan) Kohara	7	6

Quarter-finals
(Indonesia) Susanti	12	11
(Denmark) Nedegaard	9	9
(South Korea) Hwang	9	11	12
(Netherlands) van der Knapp	12	6	9

Semi-finals
(Indonesia) Susanti	3	11	11
(South Korea) Hwang	11	6	8
