= Henrik Svarrer =

Danish badminton player

Personal information
- Born: 22 June 1964 (age 62) Esbjerg, Syddanmark, Denmark
- Height: 1.78 m (5 ft 10 in)

Sport
- Country: Denmark
- Sport: Badminton
- Handedness: Left
- BWF profile
Medal record
Men's badminton
Representing Denmark
World Cup
Bronze medal – third place	1990 Bandung & Jakarta	Mixed doubles
Sudirman Cup
Bronze medal – third place	1991 Copenhagen	Mixed team
Bronze medal – third place	1995 Lausanne	Mixed team
Thomas Cup
Silver medal – second place	1996 Hong Kong	Men's team
European Championships
Gold medal – first place	1990 Moscow	Men's doubles
Silver medal – second place	1996 Herning	Men's doubles
Silver medal – second place	1992 Glasgow	Men's doubles
Bronze medal – third place	1994 Dan Bosch	Men's doubles
Bronze medal – third place	1988 Kristiansand	Mixed doubles
European Mixed Team Championships
Gold medal – first place	1988 Kristiansand	Mixed team
Gold medal – first place	1990 Moscow	Mixed team
Gold medal – first place	1996 Herning	Mixed team
Silver medal – second place	1992 Glasgow	Mixed team
Silver medal – second place	1994 Dan Bosch	Mixed team

Henrik Svarrer (born 22 June 1964) is a Danish retired badminton player. He won the men's doubles title in the 1990 European Championships.

== Career ==
Svarrer competed in badminton at the 1992 Summer Olympics in the men's doubles with Jan Paulsen. They lost in the quarter-finals to Li Yongbo and Tian Bingyi, of China, 15–11, 12–15, 17–14.

Svarrer made his second appearance at the Olympics in 1996 by competing in the men's doubles with Michael Søgaard. The duo eliminated in the second round to number 1 seed Rexy Mainaky and Ricky Subagja.

== Achievements ==
=== World Cup ===
Women's doubles
Year	Venue	Partner	Opponent	Score	Result
1990	Istora Senayan, Jakarta, Indonesia	(England) Gillian Clark	(Indonesia) Rudy Gunawan (Indonesia) Rosiana Tendean	11–15, 9–15	Bronze

=== European Championships ===
Men's doubles
Year	Venue	Partner	Opponent	Score	Result
1990	Luzhniki; Moscow, Soviet Union	(Denmark) Jan Paulsen	(Denmark) Max Gandrup (Denmark) Thomas Lund	17–16, 15–6	Gold
1992	Kelvin Hall; Glasgow, Scotland	(Denmark) Jan Paulsen	(Denmark) Jon Holst-Christensen (Denmark) Thomas Lund	9–15, 5–15	Silver
1994	Maaspoort; Den Bosch, Netherlands	(Denmark) Jim Laugesen	(Russia) Andrey Antropov (Russia) Nikolai Zuyev	11–15, 15–6, 7–15	Bronze
1996	Herning Badminton Klub; Herning, Denmark	(Denmark) Michael Søgaard	(Denmark) Jon Holst-Christensen (Denmark) Thomas Lund	15–10, 12–15, 17–18	Silver

Mixed doubles
Year	Venue	Partner	Opponent	Score	Result
1988	Badmintonsenteret; Kristiansand, Norway	(Denmark) Dorte Kjær	(Denmark) Steen Fladberg (England) Gillian Clark	15–18, 10–15	Bronze

=== IBF World Grand Prix ===
The World Badminton Grand Prix sanctioned by International Badminton Federation (IBF) from 1983 to 2006.

Men's doubles
Year	Tournament	Partner	Opponent	Score	Result
1985	Canadian Open	(Denmark) Jens Peter Nierhoff	(Scotland) Billy Gilliland (Scotland) Dan Travers	15–12, 15–11	(gold) Winner
1986	Scottish Open	(Denmark) Jesper Knudsen	(Scotland) Billy Gilliland (Scotland) Dan Travers	15–10, 15–10	(gold) Winner
1987	Carlton Inter-sport Cup	(Denmark) Jesper Knudsen	(Denmark) Mark Christiansen (Sweden) Stefan Karlsson	6–15, 10–15	(silver) Runner-up
1988	Canadian Open	(Denmark) Jens Peter Nierhoff	(China) Yang Kesen (China) Zheng Shoutai	15–9, 15–4	(gold) Winner
1988	Scottish Open	(Denmark) Claus Thomsen	(Sweden) Rikard Rönnblom (Sweden) Erik Söderberg	15–12, 15–10	(gold) Winner
1989	German Open	(Denmark) Jan Paulsen	(Denmark) Max Gandrup (Denmark) Thomas Lund	15–12, 8–15, 15–9	(gold) Winner
1989	Dutch Open	(Denmark) Jan Paulsen	(Indonesia) Rudy Gunawan (Indonesia) Eddy Hartono	11–15, 2–15	(silver) Runner-up
1991	Dutch Open	(Denmark) Jan Paulsen	(Indonesia) Rudy Gunawan (Indonesia) Eddy Hartono	2–15, 11–15	(silver) Runner-up
1992	All England Open	(Denmark) Jan Paulsen	(Indonesia) Rudy Gunawan (Indonesia) Eddy Hartono	10–15, 12–15	(silver) Runner-up
1992	Denmark Open	(Denmark) Jan Paulsen	(Denmark) Jon Holst-Christensen (Denmark) Thomas Lund	16–18, 8–15	(silver) Runner-up
1993	Denmark Open	(Denmark) Jim Laugesen	(Denmark) Jon Holst-Christensen (Denmark) Thomas Lund	5–15, 5–15	(silver) Runner-up
1993	Finnish Open	(Denmark) Christian Jakobsen	(Sweden) Jan-Eric Antonsson (Sweden) Mikael Rosén	15–7, 17–15	(gold) Winner
1994	French Open	(Denmark) Christian Jakobsen	(Indonesia) Aras Razak (Indonesia) Aman Santosa	18–16, 16–17, 12–15	(silver) Runner-up

Mixed doubles
Year	Tournament	Partner	Opponent	Score	Result
1987	Thailand Open	(Denmark) Dorte Kjær	(Denmark) Peter Buch (Denmark) Grete Mogensen	9–15, 11–15	(silver) Runner-up
1987	Carlton-Intersport-Cup	(Denmark) Dorte Kjær	(England) Andy Goode (England) Fiona Elliott	16–17, 15–9, 15–10	(gold) Winner
1988	Dutch Open	(Denmark) Dorte Kjær	(Denmark) Jesper Knudsen (Denmark) Nettie Nielsen	7–15, 11–15	(silver) Runner-up
1988	Canadian Open	(Netherlands) Erica van Dijck	(Canada) Mike Bitten (Canada) Doris Piché	15–13, 15–10	(gold) Winner
1989	Chinese Taipei Open	(Denmark) Dorte Kjær	(Denmark) Jan Paulsen (England) Gillian Gowers	15–8, 15–6	(gold) Winner
1990	Denmark Open	(Denmark) Marlene Thomsen	(Denmark) Thomas Lund (Denmark) Pernille Dupont	4–15, 10–15	(silver) Runner-up
1990	Dutch Open	(Denmark) Marlene Thomsen	(Sweden) Pär-Gunnar Jönsson (Sweden) Maria Bengtsson	15–13, 15–11	(gold) Winner
1991	Finnish Open	(Sweden) Maria Bengtsson	(Denmark) Max Gandrup (England) Gillian Clark	15–12, 15–9	(gold) Winner
1992	Chinese Taipei Open	(Denmark) Marlene Thomsen	(Sweden) Pär-Gunnar Jönsson (Sweden) Maria Bengtsson	6–15, 15–17	(silver) Runner-up

=== IBF International ===
Men's doubles
Year	Tournament	Partner	Opponent	Score	Result
1981	USSR International	(Denmark) Bent Svenningsen	(Soviet Union) Alexander Gutko (Soviet Union) Radiy Bilalov	15–5, 15–7	(gold) Winner
1986	Austrian International	(Denmark) Claus Thomsen	(Denmark) Kim Brodersen (Denmark) Jacob Thygesen	15–6, 15–3	(gold) Winner
1986	USSR International	(Denmark) Claus Thomsen	(Sweden) Peter Axelsson (Sweden) Jens Olsson	15–6, 11–15, 9–15	(silver) Runner-up
1993	Copenhagen Masters	(Denmark) Jim Laugesen	(Denmark) Jon Holst-Christensen (Denmark) Thomas Lund	3–15, 3–15	(silver) Runner-up
1994	Copenhagen Masters	(Denmark) Michael Søgaard	(Denmark) Jon Holst-Christensen (Denmark) Thomas Lund	10–15, 7–15	(silver) Runner-up
1995	Nordic Championships	(Denmark) Michael Søgaard	(Sweden) Peter Axelsson (Sweden) Pär-Gunnar Jönsson	15–9, 15–8	(gold) Winner
1995	Copenhagen Masters	(Denmark) Michael Søgaard	(England) Simon Archer (England) Chris Hunt	15–7, 15–7	(gold) Winner

Mixed doubles
Year	Tournament	Partner	Opponent	Score	Result
1981	USSR International	(Denmark) Annette Bernth	(England) Duncan Bridge (England) Jill Pringle	15–17, 3–15	(silver) Runner-up
