= 1990 European Badminton Championships =

Tournament details
- Dates: 8–14 April
- Edition: 12
- Venue: Luzhniki
- Location: Moscow, Soviet Union

The 12th European Badminton Championships were held in Moscow, Soviet Union, between 8 and 14 April 1990, and hosted by the European Badminton Union and the Sovietic Badminton Federation. There were 24 teams taking part in the mixed team event.

== Medalists ==
Event	Gold	Silver	Bronze
Men's singles	(England) Steve Baddeley	(England) Darren Hall	(England) Steve Butler
Men's singles	(England) Steve Baddeley	(England) Darren Hall	(Denmark) Poul-Erik Høyer Larsen
Women's singles	(Denmark) Pernille Nedergaard	(England) Fiona Smith	(England) Helen Troke
Women's singles	(Denmark) Pernille Nedergaard	(England) Fiona Smith	(Sweden) Christine Magnusson
Men's doubles	(Denmark) Jan Paulsen and Henrik Svarrer	(Denmark) Max Gandrup and Thomas Lund	(Sweden) Peter Axelsson and Mikael Rosén
Men's doubles	(Denmark) Jan Paulsen and Henrik Svarrer	(Denmark) Max Gandrup and Thomas Lund	(Netherlands) Alex Meijer and Pierre Pelupessy
Women's doubles	(Denmark) Dorte Kjær and Nettie Nielsen	(Netherlands) Eline Coene and Erica van Dijck	(England) Gillian Clark and Gillian Gowers
Women's doubles	(Denmark) Dorte Kjær and Nettie Nielsen	(Netherlands) Eline Coene and Erica van Dijck	(Sweden) Maria Bengtsson and Christine Magnusson
Mixed doubles	(Denmark) Jon Holst Christensen and Grete Mogensen	(Sweden) Jan-Eric Antonsson and Maria Bengtsson	(Denmark) Jan Paulsen and (England) Gillian Gowers
Mixed doubles	(Denmark) Jon Holst Christensen and Grete Mogensen	(Sweden) Jan-Eric Antonsson and Maria Bengtsson	(Denmark) Jesper Knudsen and Lotte Olsen
Teams	(Denmark) Denmark; Morten Frost; Max Gandrup; Jon Holst Christensen; Poul-Erik Høyer Larsen; Jesper Knudsen; Thomas Lund; Jan Paulsen; Henrik Svarrer; Dorte Kjær; Kirsten Larsen; Grete Mogensen; Pernille Nedergaard; Nettie Nielsen; Lotte Olsen	(Sweden) Sweden; Jan-Eric Antonsson; Peter Axelsson; Pär-Gunnar Jönsson; Jens Olsson; Mikael Rosén; Catrine Bengtsson; Maria Bengtsson; Christine Magnusson	(England) England; Steve Baddeley; Steve Butler; Darren Hall; Nick Ponting; Dave Wright; Gillian Clark; Gillian Gowers; Fiona Smith; Helen Troke

== Results ==
=== Semi-finals ===
Category	Winner	Runner-up	Score
Men's singles	(England) Darren Hall	(England) Steve Butler	15–7, 15–8
Men's singles	(England) Steve Baddeley	(Denmark) Poul-Erik Høyer Larsen	15–10, 0–15, 15–11
Women's singles	(Denmark) Pernille Nedergaard	(England) Helen Troke	11–2, 11–6
Women's singles	(England) Fiona Smith	(Sweden) Christine Magnusson	11–3, 11–1
Men's doubles	(Denmark) Max Gandrup (Denmark) Thomas Lund	(Sweden) Mikael Rosen (Sweden) Peter Axelsson	15–10, 6–15, 15–6
Men's doubles	(Denmark) Henrik Svarrer (Denmark) Jan Paulsen	(Netherlands) Alex Meijer (Netherlands) Pierre Pelupessy	15–8, 15–10
Women's doubles	(Denmark) Dorte Kjær (Denmark) Nettie Nielsen	(Sweden) Christine Magnusson (Sweden) Maria Bengtsson	13–15, 15–5, 15–3
Women's doubles	(Netherlands) Eline Coene (Netherlands) Erica van Dijck	(England) Gillian Clark (England) Gillian Gowers	15–10, 11–15, 17–15
Mixed doubles	(Sweden) Jan-Eric Antonsson (Sweden) Maria Bengtsson	(Denmark) Jesper Knudsen (Denmark) Lotte Olsen	18–13, 15–5
Mixed doubles	(Denmark) Jon-Holst Christensen (Denmark) Grete Mogensen	(Denmark) Jan Paulsen (England) Gillian Gowers	8–15, 18–14, 15–9

=== Finals ===
Category	Winners	Runners-up	Score
Men's singles	(England) Steve Baddeley	(England) Darren Hall	11–15, 15–3, 15–7
Women's singles	(Denmark) Pernille Nedergaard	(England) Fiona Smith	5–11, 12–11, 4–0 retired
Men's doubles	(Denmark) Henrik Svarrer (Denmark) Jan Paulsen	(Denmark) Max Gandrup (Denmark) Thomas Lund	17–16, 15–6
Women's doubles	(Denmark) Dorte Kjær (Denmark) Nettie Nielsen	(Netherlands) Eline Coene (Netherlands) Erica van Dijck	15–5, 15–6
Mixed doubles	(Denmark) Jon-Holst Christensen (Denmark) Grete Mogensen	(Sweden) Jan-Eric Antonsson (Sweden) Maria Bengtsson	15–7, 15–8

== Medal account ==
Pos	Country	Gold	Silver	Bronze	Total
1	Denmark	5	1	2.5	8.5
2	England	1	2	4.5	7.5
3	Sweden	0	2	3	5
4	Netherlands	0	1	1	2
