= 1994 European Badminton Championships =

Tournament details
- Dates: 10–17 April
- Edition: 14
- Location: Den Bosch, Netherlands

The 14th European Badminton Championships were held in Den Bosch, Netherlands, between 10 and 17 April 1994, and hosted by the European Badminton Union and the Nederlandse Badminton Bond.

== Medalists ==
| Event | Gold | Silver | Bronze |
|---|---|---|---|
| Men's singles | (Denmark) Poul-Erik Høyer Larsen | (Sweden) Tomas Johansson | (Sweden) Jens Olsson |
| Men's singles | (Denmark) Poul-Erik Høyer Larsen | (Sweden) Tomas Johansson | (England) Anders Nielsen |
| Women's singles | (Sweden) Lim Xiaoqing | (Sweden) Catrine Bengtsson | (Sweden) Christine Magnusson |
| Women's singles | (Sweden) Lim Xiaoqing | (Sweden) Catrine Bengtsson | (Denmark) Pernille Nedergaard |
| Men's doubles | (England) Simon Archer (England) Chris Hunt | (Russia) Andrei Antropov (Russia) Nikolai Zuyev | (Denmark) Christian Jakobsen (Denmark) Jens Eriksen |
| Men's doubles | (England) Simon Archer (England) Chris Hunt | (Russia) Andrei Antropov (Russia) Nikolai Zuyev | (Denmark) Henrik Svarrer (Denmark) Jim Laugesen |
| Women's doubles | (Sweden) Christine Magnusson (Sweden) Lim Xiaoqing | (Denmark) Lisbeth Stuer-Lauridsen (Denmark) Lotte Olsen | (England) Gillian Clark (England) Julie Bradbury |
| Women's doubles | (Sweden) Christine Magnusson (Sweden) Lim Xiaoqing | (Denmark) Lisbeth Stuer-Lauridsen (Denmark) Lotte Olsen | (Netherlands) Erica van den Heuvel (Sweden) Maria Bengtsson |
| Mixed doubles | (Denmark) Michael Søgaard (Sweden) Catrine Bengtsson | (Denmark) Christian Jakobsen (Denmark) Lotte Olsen | (Sweden) Pär-Gunnar Jönsson (Sweden) Maria Bengtsson |
| Mixed doubles | (Denmark) Michael Søgaard (Sweden) Catrine Bengtsson | (Denmark) Christian Jakobsen (Denmark) Lotte Olsen | (Netherlands) Ron Michels (Netherlands) Erica van den Heuvel |
| Teams | Sweden | Denmark | England |

== Results ==
=== Semi-finals ===
| Category | Winner | Runner-up | Score |
|---|---|---|---|
| Men's singles | (Sweden) Tomas Johansson | (England) Anders Ward Nielsen | 17–14, 15–6 |
| Men's singles | (Denmark) Poul-Erik Høyer Larsen | (Sweden) Jens Olsson | 15–9, 15–9 |
| Women's singles | (Sweden) Catrine Bengtsson | (Sweden) Christine Magnusson | 5–11, 11–0, 11–4 |
| Women's singles | (Sweden) Lim Xiaoqing | (Denmark) Pernille Nedergaard | 11–1, 6–11, 11–6 |
| Men's doubles | (England) Chris Hunt (England) Simon Archer | (Denmark) Christian Jakobsen (Denmark) Jens Eriksen | 15–12, 7–15, 15–12 |
| Men's doubles | (Russia) Andrey Antropov (Russia) Nikolai Zuyev | (Denmark) Henrik Svarrer (Denmark) Jim Laugesen | 15–11, 6–15, 15–7 |
| Women's doubles | (Denmark) Lisbet Stuer-Lauridsen (Denmark) Lotte Olsen | (Netherlands) Erica van den Heuvel (Sweden) Maria Bengtsson | 15–2, 15–8 |
| Women's doubles | (Sweden) Christine Magnusson (Sweden) Lim Xiaoqing | (England) Gillian Clark (England) Julie Bradbury | 15–11, 12–15, 18–14 |
| Mixed doubles | (Denmark) Michael Søgaard (Sweden) Catrine Bengtsson | (Sweden) Pär-Gunnar Jönsson (Sweden) Maria Bengtsson | 15–6, 15–6 |
| Mixed doubles | (Denmark) Christian Jakobsen (Denmark) Lotte Olsen | (Netherlands) Ron Michels (Netherlands) Erica van den Heuvel | 15–5, 15–2 |

=== Finals ===
| Category | Winners | Runners-up | Score |
|---|---|---|---|
| Men's singles | (Denmark) Poul-Erik Høyer Larsen | (Sweden) Tomas Johansson | 15–9, 15–5 |
| Women's singles | (Sweden) Lim Xiaoqing | (Sweden) Catrine Bengtsson | 11–5, 12–9 |
| Men's doubles | (England) Chris Hunt (England) Simon Archer | (Russia) Andrey Antropov (Russia) Nikolai Zuyev | 18–16, 15–4 |
| Women's doubles | (Sweden) Christine Magnusson (Sweden) Lim Xiaoqing | (Denmark) Lisbet Stuer-Lauridsen (Denmark) Lotte Olsen | 17–14, 15–12 |
| Mixed doubles | (Denmark) Michael Søgaard (Sweden) Catrine Bengtsson | (Denmark) Christian Jakobsen (Denmark) Lotte Olsen | 15–6, 15–9 |

== Medal account ==
| Pos | Country | Gold | Silver | Bronze | Total |
|---|---|---|---|---|---|
| 1 | Sweden | 3.5 | 2 | 3.5 | 9 |
| 2 | Denmark | 1.5 | 3 | 3 | 7.5 |
| 3 | England | 1 | 0 | 3 | 4 |
| 4 | Russia | 0 | 1 | 0 | 1 |
| 5 | Netherlands | 0 | 0 | 1.5 | 1.5 |
