= Jan Paulsen (badminton) =

Danish badminton player

Personal information
- Born: 12 February 1967 (age 59)
- Height: 1.83 m (6 ft 0 in)

Sport
- Country: Denmark
- Sport: Badminton
- Handedness: Right
- BWF profile
Medal record
Men's badminton
Representing Denmark
World Cup
Silver medal – second place	1990 Jakarta	Mixed doubles
Silver medal – second place	1992 Guangzhou	Mixed doubles
Bronze medal – third place	1987 Kuala Lumpur	Mixed doubles
Sudirman Cup
Bronze medal – third place	1989 Jakarta	Mixed team
Bronze medal – third place	1991 Copenhagen	Mixed team
Bronze medal – third place	1993 Birmingham	Mixed team
European Championships
Gold medal – first place	1990 Moscow	Men's doubles
Silver medal – second place	1988 Kristiansand	Men's doubles
Silver medal – second place	1992 Glasgow	Men's doubles
Bronze medal – third place	1990 Moscow	Mixed doubles
European Mixed Team Championships
Gold medal – first place	1988 Kristiansand	Mixed team
Gold medal – first place	1990 Moscow	Mixed team
Silver medal – second place	1992 Glasgow	Mixed team
European Junior Championships
Gold medal – first place	1985 Pressbaum	Boys' doubles
Gold medal – first place	1985 Pressbaum	Mixed doubles
Gold medal – first place	1985 Pressbaum	Mixed team
Silver medal – second place	1983 Helsinki	Mixed team
Silver medal – second place	1985 Pressbaum	Boys' singles

Jan Paulsen (born 12 February 1967) is a Danish retired badminton player.

Paulsen competed in badminton at the 1992 Summer Olympics in men's doubles with Henrik Svarrer. They lost in the quarterfinals to Li Yongbo and Tian Bingyi, of China, 15–11, 12–15, 17–14.

== Achievements ==
=== World Cup ===
Mixed doubles
Year	Venue	Partner	Opponent	Score	Result
1987	Stadium Negara, Kuala Lumpur, Malaysia	(England) Gillian Gowers	(China) Wang Pengren (China) Shi Fangjing	10–15, 7–15	Bronze
1990	Istora Senayan, Jakarta, Indonesia	(England) Gillian Gowers	(Indonesia) Rudy Gunawan (Indonesia) Rosiana Tendean	15–11, 9–15, 3–15	Silver
1992	Guangzhou Gymnasium, Guangzhou, China	(England) Gillian Gowers	(Indonesia) Rudy Gunawan (Indonesia) Rosiana Tendean	15–17, 9–15	Silver

=== European Championships ===
Men's doubles
Year	Venue	Partner	Opponent	Score	Result
1988	Badmintonsenteret, Kristiansand, Norway	(Denmark) Steen Fladberg	(Denmark) Michael Kjeldsen (Denmark) Jens Peter Nierhoff	9–15, 11–15	Silver
1990	Luzhniki; Moscow, Soviet Union	(Denmark) Henrik Svarrer	(Denmark) Max Gandrup (Denmark) Thomas Lund	17–16, 15–6	Gold
1992	Kelvin Hall; Glasgow, Scotland	(Denmark) Henrik Svarrer	(Denmark) Jon Holst-Christensen (Denmark) Thomas Lund	9–15, 5–15	Silver

Mixed doubles
Year	Venue	Partner	Opponent	Score	Result
1990	Luzhniki; Moscow, Soviet Union	(England) Gillian Gowers	(Denmark) Jon Holst-Christensen (Denmark) Grete Mogensen	15–8, 14–18, 9–15	Bronze

=== European Junior Championships ===
Boys' singles
Year	Venue	Opponent	Score	Result
1985	Pressbaum, Austria	(England) Matthew Smith	15–17, 10–15	Silver

Boys' doubles
Year	Venue	Partner	Opponent	Score	Result
1985	Pressbaum, Austria	(Denmark) Lars Pedersen	(Denmark) Johnny Borglum (Denmark) Max Gandrup	15–12, 9–15, 15–8	Gold

Mixed doubles
Year	Venue	Partner	Opponent	Score	Result
1985	Pressbaum, Austria	(Denmark) Marian Christiansen	(Denmark) Max Gandrup (Denmark) Charlotte Jacobsen	15–2, retired	Gold

=== IBF World Grand Prix ===
The World Badminton Grand Prix sanctioned by International Badminton Federation (IBF) from 1983 to 2006.

Men's doubles
Year	Tournament	Partner	Opponent	Score	Result
1988	German Open	(Denmark) Steen Fladberg	(China) Chen Hongyong (China) Chen Kang	15–8, 6–15, 18–13	(gold) Winner
1989	German Open	(Denmark) Henrik Svarrer	(Denmark) Thomas Lund (Denmark) Max Gandrup	15–12, 8–15, 15–9	(gold) Winner
1989	Dutch Open	(Denmark) Henrik Svarrer	(Indonesia) Eddy Hartono (Indonesia) Rudy Gunawan	11–15, 2–15	(silver) Runner-up
1991	Dutch Open	(Denmark) Henrik Svarrer	(Indonesia) Eddy Hartono (Indonesia) Rudy Gunawan	2–15, 11–15	(silver) Runner-up
1992	All England Open	(Denmark) Henrik Svarrer	(Indonesia) Eddy Hartono (Indonesia) Rudy Gunawan	10–15, 12–15	(silver) Runner-up
1992	Denmark Open	(Denmark) Henrik Svarrer	(Denmark) Thomas Lund (Denmark) Jon Holst-Christensen	16–18, 8–15	(silver) Runner-up

Mixed doubles
Year	Tournament	Partner	Opponent	Score	Result
1987	Indonesia Open	(England) Gillian Gowers	(China) Zhou Jincan (China) Lao Yujing	14–18, 15–9, 15–7	(gold) Winner
1989	Chinese Taipei Open	(England) Gillian Gowers	(Denmark) Henrik Svarrer (Denmark) Dorte Kjaer	8–15, 6–15	(silver) Runner-up
1989	Poona Open	(England) Gillian Gowers	(Sweden) Jan-Eric Antonsson (Sweden) Maria Bengtsson	18–15, 15–12	(gold) Winner
1989	German Open	(England) Gillian Gowers	(Indonesia) Rudy Gunawan (Indonesia) Rosiana Tendean	18–16, 15–8	(gold) Winner
1990	Malaysia Open	(England) Gillian Gowers	(South Korea) Park Joo-bong (South Korea) Chung Myung-hee	12–15, 1–15	(silver) Runner-up
1990	Singapore Open	(England) Gillian Gowers	(Sweden) Jan-Eric Antonsson (Sweden) Maria Bengtsson	15–9, 10–15, 7–15	(silver) Runner-up
1990	German Open	(England) Gillian Gowers	(Sweden) Par-Gunnar Jonsson (Sweden) Maria Bengtsson	7–15, 5–15	(silver) Runner-up
1991	German Open	(England) Gillian Gowers	(Denmark) Thomas Lund (Denmark) Pernille Dupont	12–15, 14–17	(silver) Runner-up
1992	Finnish Open	(England) Fiona Smith	(Denmark) Max Gandrup (Denmark) Marlene Thomsen	15–17, 15–8, 12–15	(silver) Runner-up

=== IBF International ===
Men's doubles
Year	Tournament	Partner	Opponent	Score	Result
1992	Nordic Championships	(Denmark) Jon Holst-Christensen	(Sweden) Peter Axelsson (Sweden) Par-Gunnar Jonsson	18–15, 15–11	(gold) Winner
