= Pernille Dupont =

Danish badminton player

Personal information
- Full name: Pernille Dupont Jensen
- Born: 6 October 1967 (age 59) Gentofte, Denmark
- Height: 1.78 m (5 ft 10 in)

Sport
- Country: Denmark
- Sport: Badminton
- Handedness: Right
- BWF profile
Medal record
Women's badminton
Representing Denmark
World Championships
Silver medal – second place	1991 Copenhagen	Mixed doubles
World Cup
Silver medal – second place	1991 Macau	Mixed doubles
Sudirman Cup
Bronze medal – third place	1991 Copenhagen	Mixed team
European Championships
Gold medal – first place	1992 Glasgow	Mixed doubles
European Mixed Team Championships
Silver medal – second place	1992 Glasgow	Mixed team

Pernille Dupont (born 6 October 1967) is a retired female badminton player from Denmark. She is formerly played for Gentofte BK and representing Denmark in the international tournament.

== Career ==
She won the silver medal at the 1991 IBF World Championships in mixed doubles with Thomas Lund. She competed in badminton at the 1992 Summer Olympics in women's doubles with Grete Mogensen. Pernille won several major honours in mixed doubles categories mostly with Thomas Lund including All England Open (1992), a European Championship Gold medal in 1992 and also a 3 times winner of World Badminton Grand Prix Finals successively from 1990 until 1992.

== Post-Career ==
She was awarded with Badminton Denmark's badge of merit from Badminton Denmark. After retiring, she worked in both Copenhagen and New York and graduated with Master of Business Administration degrees from Columbia University which landed her a job as a private banker in Goldman Sachs private wealth management She since has left the job to set up her own business in India.

== Achievements ==
=== World Championships ===
Mixed doubles
Year	Venue	Partner	Opponent	Score	Result
1991	Brøndby Arena, Copenhagen, Denmark	(Denmark) Thomas Lund	(South Korea) Park Joo-bong (South Korea) Chung Myung-hee	5–15, 17–15, 9–15	Silver

=== World Cup ===
Mixed doubles
Year	Venue	Partner	Opponent	Score	Result
1991	Macau Forum, Macau	(Denmark) Thomas Lund	(Indonesia) Rudy Gunawan (Indonesia) Rosiana Tendean	10–15, 9–15	Silver

=== European Championships ===
Mixed doubles
Year	Venue	Partner	Opponent	Score	Result
1992	Kelvin Hall; Glasgow, Scotland	(Denmark) Thomas Lund	(Denmark) Jon Holst-Christensen (Denmark) Grete Mogensen	15–4, 9–15, 15–12	Gold

=== IBF World Grand Prix (22 titles, 8 runners-up) ===
The World Badminton Grand Prix was sanctioned by the International Badminton Federation (IBF) from 1983 to 2006.

Women's doubles
Year	Tournament	Partner	Opponent	Score	Result
1989	Dutch Open	(Denmark) Grete Mogensen	(England) Gillian Clark (England) Gillian Gowers	15–11, 15–9	(gold) Winner
1990	German Open	(Denmark) Grete Mogensen	(Denmark) Dorte Kjaer (Denmark) Lotte Olsen	9–15, 14–17	(silver) Runner-up
1992	Canada Open	(Denmark) Lotte Olsen	(Canada) Denyse Julien (England) Joanne Muggeridge	15–7, 15–7	(gold) Winner

Mixed doubles
Year	Tournament	Partner	Opponent	Score	Result
1987	Denmark Open	(Denmark) Thomas Lund	(Denmark) Mark Christiansen (Sweden) Maria Bengtsson	12–15, 5–15	(silver) Runner-up
1989	Malaysia Open	(Denmark) Thomas Lund	(South Korea) Park Joo-bong (South Korea) Chung So-young	7–15, 13–15	(silver) Runner-up
1989	World Grand Prix Finals	(Denmark) Thomas Lund	(Indonesia) Eddy Hartono (Indonesia) Verawaty Fadjrin	15–12, 7–15, 6–15	(silver) Runner-up
1990	Chinese Taipei Open	(Denmark) Thomas Lund	(Sweden) Jan-Eric Antonsson (Sweden) Maria Bengtsson	15–4, 4–15, 15–10	(gold) Winner
1990	Japan Open	(Denmark) Thomas Lund	(South Korea) Park Joo-bong (South Korea) Chung Myung-hee	10–15, 12–15	(silver) Runner-up
1990	Finnish Open	(Denmark) Thomas Lund	(Denmark) Jon Holst-Christensen (Denmark) Grete Mogensen	18–14, 13–15, 15–10	(gold) Winner
1990	Denmark Open	(Denmark) Thomas Lund	(Denmark) Henrik Svarrer (Denmark) Marlene Thomsen	15–4, 15–10	(gold) Winner
1990	World Grand Prix Finals	(Denmark) Thomas Lund	(Denmark) Jon Holst-Christensen (Denmark) Grete Mogensen	12–15, 15–9, 15–8	(gold) Winner
1991	Chinese Taipei Open	(Denmark) Thomas Lund	(Sweden) Par-Gunnar Jonsson (Sweden) Maria Bengtsson	15–9, 10–15, 18–17	(gold) Winner
1991	Swedish Open	(Denmark) Thomas Lund	(Sweden) Par-Gunnar Jonsson (Sweden) Maria Bengtsson	15–7, 15–8	(gold) Winner
1991	Scottish Open	(Denmark) Thomas Lund	(Denmark) Jon Holst-Christensen (Denmark) Grete Mogensen	15–2, 9–15, 14–18	(silver) Runner-up
1991	All England Open	(Denmark) Thomas Lund	(South Korea) Park Joo-bong (South Korea) Chung Myung-hee	10–15, 15–10, 4–15	(silver) Runner-up
1991	Malaysia Open	(Denmark) Thomas Lund	(South Korea) Lee Sang-bok (South Korea) Chung So-young	11–15, 8–15	(silver) Runner-up
1991	Indonesia Open	(Denmark) Thomas Lund	(Indonesia) Aryono Miranat (Indonesia) Eliza Nathanael	15–8, 15–12	(gold) Winner
1991	Singapore Open	(Denmark) Thomas Lund	(Sweden) Par-Gunnar Jonsson (Sweden) Maria Bengtsson	15–8, 15–12	(gold) Winner
1991	German Open	(Denmark) Thomas Lund	(Denmark) Jan Paulsen (England) Gillian Gowers	15–12, 17–14	(gold) Winner
1991	Denmark Open	(Denmark) Thomas Lund	(Denmark) Jon Holst-Christensen (Denmark) Grete Mogensen	15–7, 6–15, 15–7	(gold) Winner
1991	World Grand Prix Finals	(Denmark) Thomas Lund	(South Korea) Shon Jin-Hwan (South Korea) Gil Young-ah	11–15, 15–7, 15–9	(gold) Winner
1992	Japan Open	(Denmark) Thomas Lund	(Denmark) Jon Holst-Christensen (Denmark) Grete Mogensen	15–5, 15–11	(gold) Winner
1992	Korea Open	(Denmark) Thomas Lund	(South Korea) Lee Sang-bok (South Korea) Shim Eun-jung	15–11, 15–9	(gold) Winner
1992	All England Open	(Denmark) Thomas Lund	(Denmark) Jon Holst-Christensen (Denmark) Grete Mogensen	15–10, 15–1	(gold) Winner
1992	Malaysia Open	(Denmark) Thomas Lund	(Denmark) Jon Holst-Christensen (Denmark) Lotte Olsen	15–8, 15–12	(gold) Winner
1992	Canada Open	(Denmark) Thomas Lund	(Hong Kong) Chan Siu Kwong (Hong Kong) Chung Hoi Yuk	15–7, 15–4	(gold) Winner
1992	U.S. Open	(Denmark) Thomas Lund	(Sweden) Jan-Eric Antonsson (Denmark) Lotte Olsen	15–5, 15–10	(gold) Winner
1992	German Open	(Denmark) Thomas Lund	(Sweden) Par-Gunnar Jonsson (Sweden) Maria Bengtsson	15–9, 15–12	(gold) Winner
1992	Denmark Open	(Denmark) Thomas Lund	(Denmark) Jon Holst-Christensen (Denmark) Anne-Mette van Dijk	15–10, 15–9	(gold) Winner
1992	World Grand Prix Finals	(Denmark) Thomas Lund	(Denmark) Jon Holst-Christensen (Denmark) Grete Mogensen	15–5, 15–2	(gold) Winner

=== IBF International (3 titles, 1 runner-up) ===
Women's singles
Year	Tournament	Opponent	Score	Result
1987	Portugal International	(Denmark) Lotte Olsen	7–11, 11–1, 11–6	(gold) Winner

Women's doubles
Year	Tournament	Partner	Opponent	Score	Result
1987	Portugal International	(Denmark) Lotte Olsen	(Sweden) Lillian Johannsson (Sweden) Anneli Johannsson	15–2, 15–7	(gold) Winner

Mixed doubles
Year	Tournament	Partner	Opponent	Score	Result
1987	Portugal International	(England) A. Choudhury	(Portugal) José Nascimento (Denmark) Lotte Olsen	7–15, 8–15	(silver) Runner-up
1990	Nordic Championships	(Denmark) Thomas Lund	(Denmark) Jon Holst-Christensen (Denmark) Grete Mogensen	15–8, 15–12	(gold) Winner
