= Lotte Olsen =

Danish badminton player

Personal information
- Born: Lotte Olsen; 23 November 1966 (age 59) Nyborg, Denmark
- Height: 169 cm (5 ft 7 in)
- Weight: 72 kg (159 lb)

Sport
- Country: Denmark
- Sport: Badminton
- Handedness: Right
- Highest ranking: 1 (1993)
- BWF profile
Medal record
Women's badminton
Representing Denmark
World Championships
Bronze medal – third place	1993 Birmingham	Women's doubles
World Cup
Bronze medal – third place	1994 Ho Chi Minh	Women's doubles
Sudirman Cup
Bronze medal – third place	1989 Jakarta	Mixed team
Bronze medal – third place	1993 Birmingham	Mixed team
Bronze medal – third place	1995 Lausanne	Mixed team
Uber Cup
Bronze medal – third place	1996 Hong Kong	Women's team
European Championships
Silver medal – second place	1994 Dan Bosch	Women's doubles
Silver medal – second place	1994 Dan Bosch	Mixed doubles
Bronze medal – third place	1990 Moscow	Mixed doubles
European Mixed Team Championships
Gold medal – first place	1990 Moscow	Mixed team
Silver medal – second place	1994 Dan Bosch	Mixed team
European Junior Championships
Gold medal – first place	1985 Pressbaum	Girls' doubles
Gold medal – first place	1985 Pressbaum	Mixed team
Silver medal – second place	1985 Pressbaum	Girls' singles

Lotte Olsen (born 23 November 1966) is a retired female badminton player from Denmark, who won a silver medal at the 1993 IBF World Championships and competed at the 1996 Summer Olympics. She won several international tournaments, and four Danish National Badminton Championships in women's doubles during her career.

Lotte Olsen was a leading women's doubles player from her junior year, and won the Danish under-19 championship in 1984 and 1985. She won the silver medal at the 1993 IBF World Championships in women's doubles with Lisbeth Stuer-Lauridsen. They won silver medals at the 1994 European Badminton Championships, where Olsen also won silver medals with Christian Jacobsen in mixed doubles.

Lotte is the older sister of badminton player Rikke Olsen, and together they won the 1995 Hamburg Open in women's doubles. She also competed in badminton at the 1996 Summer Olympics in women's doubles with Ann Jørgensen and in mix with Christian Jakobsen. In women's doubles, she lost in the quarter final to the runners-up from South Korea. She ended her career after the Olympics, and later received the Danish Badminton Federation badge of merit.

== Achievements ==
=== World Championships ===
Women's Doubles
Year	Venue	Partner	Opponent	Score	Result
1993	National Indoor Arena; Birmingham, England	(Denmark) Lisbet Stuer-Lauridsen	(China) Nong Qunhua (China) Zhou Lei	2–15, 13–15	Bronze

=== World Cup ===
Women's doubles
Year	Venue	Partner	Opponent	Score	Result
1994	Phan Đình Phùng Indoor Stadium; Ho Chi Minh, Vietnam	(Denmark) Lisbet Stuer-Lauridsen	(Indonesia) Finarsih (Indonesia) Lili Tampi	3–15, 5–15	Bronze

=== European Championships ===
Women's doubles
Year	Venue	Partner	Opponent	Score	Result
1994	Maaspoort; Den Bosch, Netherlands	(Denmark) Lisbet Stuer-Lauridsen	(Sweden) Lim Xiaoqing (Sweden) Christine Magnusson	14–17, 12–15	Silver

Mixed doubles
Year	Venue	Partner	Opponent	Score	Result
1990	Luzhniki Small Sports Arena; Moscow, Soviet Union	(Denmark) Jasper Knudsen	(Sweden) Jan-Eric Antonsson (Sweden) Maria Bengtsson	13–18, 5–15	Bronze
1994	Maaspoort; Den Bosch, Netherlands	(Denmark) Christian Jakobsen	(Denmark) Michael Sogaard (Sweden) Catrine Bengtsson	6–15, 9–15	Silver

=== European Junior Championships ===
Girls' singles
Year	Venue	Opponent	Score	Result
1985	Sacré Coeur Cloister Hall; Pressbaum, Austria	(Denmark) Lisbet Stuer-Lauridsen	5–11, 6–11	Silver

Girls' doubles
Year	Venue	Partner	Opponent	Score	Result
1985	Sacré Coeur Cloister Hall; Pressbaum, Austria	(Denmark) Lisbet Stuer-Lauridsen	(England) Debbie Hore (England) Sara Halsall	15–11, 9–15, 15–7	Gold

=== IBF World Grand Prix ===
The World Badminton Grand Prix sanctioned by International Badminton Federation (IBF) since 1983.

Women's doubles
Year	Tournament	Partner	Opponent	Score	Result
1989	Chinese Taipei Open	(Denmark) Dorte Kjær	(Sweden) Maria Bengtsson (Sweden) Christine Magnussen	13–15, 15–9, 6–15	(silver) Runner-up
1990	Danish Open	(Denmark) Dorte Kjær	(England) Gillian Clark (England) Gillian Gowers	15–13, 9–15, 15–11	(gold) Winner
1990	German Open	(Denmark) Dorte Kjær	(Denmark) Pernille Dupont (Denmark) Grete Mogensen	10–15, 15–2, 15–9	(gold) Winner
1992	Canada Open	(Denmark) Pernille Dupont	(Canada) Denyse Julien (England) Joanne Muggeridge	15–7, 15–7	(gold) Winner
1993	Malaysia Open	(Denmark) Lisbet Stuer-Lauridsen	(Sweden) Lim Xiaoqing (Sweden) Christine Magnusson	12–15, 14–18	(silver) Runner-up
1993	Canada Open	(Denmark) Lisbet Stuer-Lauridsen	(Sweden) Lim Xiaoqing (Sweden) Christine Magnusson	11–15, 5–15	(silver) Runner-up
1993	Denmark Open	(Denmark) Lisbet Stuer-Lauridsen	(Japan) Tokiko Hirota (Japan) Yuki Koike	15–4, 15–2	(gold) Winner
1993	Scottish Open	(Denmark) Lisbet Stuer-Lauridsen	(Denmark) Anne-Mette van Dijk (Denmark) Marlene Thomsen	11–15, 15–10, 15–7	(gold) Winner
1994	Chinese Taipei Open	(Denmark) Lisbet Stuer-Lauridsen	(Indonesia) Finarsih (Indonesia) Lili Tampi	9–15, 4–15	(silver) Runner-up
1994	Swiss Open	(Denmark) Lisbet Stuer-Lauridsen	(Denmark) Anne-Mette van Dijk (Denmark) Marlene Thomsen	15–6, 3–15, 15–4	(gold) Winner

Mixed doubles
Year	Tournament	Partner	Opponent	Score	Result
1992	Malaysia Open	(Denmark) Jon Holst-Christensen	(Denmark) Thomas Lund (Denmark) Pernille Dupont	8–15, 12–15	(silver) Runner-up
1992	U.S. Open	(Sweden) Jan-Eric Antonsson	(Denmark) Thomas Lund (Denmark) Pernille Dupont	5–15, 10–15	(silver) Runner-up
1993	Canada Open	(Denmark) Christian Jakobsen	(Denmark) Thomas Lund (Sweden) Catrine Bengtsson	2–15, 9–15	(silver) Runner-up

=== IBF International ===
Women's singles
Year	Tournament	Opponent	Score	Result
1987	Portugal International	(Denmark) Pernille Dupont	11–7, 1–11, 6–11	(silver) Runner-up

Women's doubles
Year	Tournament	Partner	Opponent	Score	Result
1984	Norwegian International	(Denmark) Marian Christiansen	(Sweden) Lillian Johannsson (Sweden) Catharina Andersson	15–13, 7–15, 18–16	(gold) Winner
1987	Portugal International	(Denmark) Pernille Dupont	(Sweden) Lillian Johannsson (Sweden) Anneli Johannsson	15–2, 15–7	(gold) Winner
1989	Norwegian International	(Denmark) Camilla Martin	(Soviet Union) Svetlana Beliasova (Soviet Union) Irina Serova	15–10, 15–10	(gold) Winner
1989	Stockholm International	(Denmark) Dorte Kjær	(Soviet Union) Elena Rybkina (Soviet Union) Vlada Tcherniavskaia	4–15, 15–6, 15–3	(gold) Winner
1990	Nordic Championships	(Denmark) Dorte Kjær	(Denmark) Nettie Nielsen (Denmark) Lisbet Stuer-Lauridsen	15–8, 15–7	(gold) Winner
1992	Nordic Championships	(Denmark) Marlene Thomsen	(Sweden) Lim Xiaoqing (Sweden) Christine Magnusson	6–15, 13–15	(silver) Runner-up
1995	Hamburg Cup	(Denmark) Rikke Olsen	(Netherlands) Eline Coene (Netherlands) Erica Van Den Heuvel	15–6, 12–15, 15–13	(gold) Winner

Mixed doubles
Year	Tournament	Partner	Opponent	Score	Result
1987	Portugal International	(Portugal) José Nascimento	(England) A. Choudhury (Denmark) Pernille Dupont	15–7, 15–8	(gold) Winner
1989	Norwegian International	(Denmark) Thomas Stuer-Lauridsen	(Denmark) Lars Pedersen (Denmark) Anne Mette Bille	15–9, 15–7	(gold) Winner
1994	Hamburg Cup	(Denmark) Christian Jakobsen	(Denmark) Thomas Lund (Denmark) Marlene Thomsen	8–15, 6–15	(silver) Runner-up
