= 1992 European Badminton Championships =

Tournament details
- Dates: 12–18 April
- Edition: 13
- Location: Glasgow, Scotland

The 13th European Badminton Championships were held in Glasgow, Scotland, between 12 and 18 April 1992, and hosted by the European Badminton Union and the BadmintonScotland.

== Medalists ==
Event	Gold	Silver	Bronze
Men's singles	(Denmark) Poul-Erik Høyer Larsen	(Denmark) Thomas Stuer Lauridsen	(Denmark) Peter Espersen
Men's singles	(Denmark) Poul-Erik Høyer Larsen	(Denmark) Thomas Stuer Lauridsen	(England) Anders Nielsen
Women's singles	(Denmark) Pernille Nedergaard	(Denmark) Camilla Martin	(Sweden) Lim Xiaoqing
Women's singles	(Denmark) Pernille Nedergaard	(Denmark) Camilla Martin	(Commonwealth of Independent States) Elena Rybkina
Men's doubles	(Denmark) Jon Holst Christensen and Thomas Lund	(Denmark) Jan Paulsen and Henrik Svarrer	(Sweden) Peter Axelsson and Pär-Gunnar Jönsson
Men's doubles	(Denmark) Jon Holst Christensen and Thomas Lund	(Denmark) Jan Paulsen and Henrik Svarrer	(Germany) Stephan Kuhl and Stefan Frey
Women's doubles	(Sweden) Lim Xiaoqing and Christine Magnusson	(Denmark) Marlene Thomsen and Lisbeth Stuer-Lauridsen	(England) Sara Sankey and Gillian Gowers
Women's doubles	(Sweden) Lim Xiaoqing and Christine Magnusson	(Denmark) Marlene Thomsen and Lisbeth Stuer-Lauridsen	(Sweden) Maria Bengtsson and Catrine Bengtsson
Mixed doubles	(Denmark) Thomas Lund and Pernille Dupont	(Denmark) Jon Holst Christensen and Grete Mogensen	(Netherlands) Ron Michels and Sonja Mellink
Mixed doubles	(Denmark) Thomas Lund and Pernille Dupont	(Denmark) Jon Holst Christensen and Grete Mogensen	(Sweden) Pär-Gunnar Jönsson and Maria Bengtsson
Teams	Sweden	Denmark	England

== Results ==
=== Semi-finals ===
Category	Winner	Runner-up	Score
Men's singles	(Denmark) Poul-Erik Høyer Larsen	(Denmark) Peter Espersen	15–7, 15–9
Men's singles	(Denmark) Thomas Stuer-Lauridsen	(England) Anders Ward Nielsen	8–15, 15–7, 15–13
Women's singles	(Denmark) Camilla Martin	(Sweden) Lim Xiaoqing	11–7, 12–10
Women's singles	(Denmark) Pernille Nedergaard	(Commonwealth of Independent States) Elena Rybkina	11–1, 11–7
Men's doubles	(Denmark) Jon-Holst Christensen (Denmark) Thomas Lund	(Sweden) Peter Axelsson (Sweden) Pär-Gunnar Jönsson	18–15, 10–15, 15–5
Men's doubles	(Denmark) Henrik Svarrer (Denmark) Jan Paulsen	(Germany) Stefan Frey (Germany) Stephan Kuhl	15–1, 15–5
Women's doubles	(Sweden) Christine Magnusson (Sweden) Lim Xiaoqing	(England) Gillian Gowers (England) Sara Sankey	15–5, 17–15
Women's doubles	(Denmark) Lisbet Stuer-Lauridsen (Denmark) Marlene Thomsen	(Sweden) Catrine Bengtsson (Sweden) Maria Bengtsson	9–15, 18–16, 15–3
Mixed doubles	(Denmark) Thomas Lund (Denmark) Pernille Dupont	(Netherlands) Ron Michels (Netherlands) Sonja Mellink	15–6, 15–8
Mixed doubles	(Denmark) Jon-Holst Christensen (Denmark) Grete Mogensen	(Sweden) Pär-Gunnar Jönsson (Sweden) Maria Bengtsson	15–6, 15–11

=== Finals ===
Category	Winners	Runners-up	Score
Men's singles	(Denmark) Poul-Erik Høyer Larsen	(Denmark) Thomas Stuer-Lauridsen	15–10, 15–10
Women's singles	(Denmark) Pernille Nedergaard	(Denmark) Camilla Martin	12–10, 6–11, 11–7
Men's doubles	(Denmark) Jon-Holst Christensen (Denmark) Thomas Lund	(Denmark) Henrik Svarrer (Denmark) Jan Paulsen	15–9, 15–5
Women's doubles	(Sweden) Christine Magnusson (Sweden) Lim Xiaoqing	(Denmark) Lisbet Stuer-Lauridsen (Denmark) Marlene Thomsen	8–15, 15–11, 15–8
Mixed doubles	(Denmark) Thomas Lund (Denmark) Pernille Dupont	(Denmark) Jon-Holst Christensen (Denmark) Grete Mogensen	15–4, 9–15, 15–12

== Medal account ==
Pos	Country	Gold	Silver	Bronze	Total
1	Denmark	4	6	1	11
2	Sweden	2	0	4	6
3	England	0	0	3	3
4	Germany	0	0	1	1
4	Netherlands	0	0	1	1
4	(Commonwealth of Independent States) CIS	0	0	1	1
