= Pernille Nedergaard =

Danish badminton player

Personal information
- Full name: Pernille Nedergaard Jessen
- Born: 5 December 1967 (age 58) Copenhagen, Denmark
- Height: 1.74 m (5 ft 9 in)

Sport
- Country: Denmark
- Sport: Badminton
- Handedness: Left
- BWF profile
Medal record
Women's badminton
Representing Denmark
Sudirman Cup
Bronze medal – third place	1989 Jakarta	Mixed team
Bronze medal – third place	1991 Copenhagen	Mixed team
Bronze medal – third place	1993 Birmingham	Mixed team
European Championships
Gold medal – first place	1990 Moscow	Women's singles
Gold medal – first place	1992 Glasgow	Women's singles
Bronze medal – third place	1994 Den Bosch	Women's singles
European Mixed Team Championships
Gold medal – first place	1990 Moscow	Mixed team
Silver medal – second place	1992 Glasgow	Mixed team
Silver medal – second place	1994 Den Bosch	Mixed team

Pernille Nedergaard (born 5 December 1967) is a retired female badminton player from Denmark.

She won the European Badminton Championships in women's singles in 1990 and 1992. She also competed in the women's singles tournament at the 1992 Summer Olympics.

Pernille retired in 2002, when she was 36 and make a small comeback for Værløse club back in 2006 in domestic league. Nowadays, she is married to Jens Glavind and had two children, working as a secretary for Peter Brixtofte, when he was the mayor of Farum.

== Achievements ==
=== European Championships ===
Women's singles
Year	Venue	Opponent	Score	Result
1990	Luzhniki Small Sports Arena; Moscow, Soviet Union	(England) Fiona Smith	5–11, 12–11, 4–0 retired	Gold
1992	Glasgow, Scotland	(Denmark) Camilla Martin	12–10, 6–11, 11–7	Gold
1994	Den Bosch, Netherlands	(Sweden) Lim Xiaoqing	1–11, 11–6, 6–11	Bronze

=== IBF World Grand Prix ===
The World Badminton Grand Prix was sanctioned by the International Badminton Federation from 1983 to 2006.

Women's singles
Year	Tournament	Opponent	Score	Result
1986	Denmark Open	(China) Zheng Yuli	4–11, 3–11	(silver) Runner-up
1988	Chinese Taipei Open	(Denmark) Kirsten Larsen	3–11, 11–6, 6–11	(silver) Runner-up
1989	Scottish Open	(Denmark) Kirsten Larsen	5–11, 1–11	(silver) Runner-up
1989	German Open	(England) Helen Troke	11–4, 8–11, 7–11	(silver) Runner-up
1990	Finnish Open	(Sweden) Christine Gandrup	12–10, 11–0	(gold) Winner
1990	Dutch Open	(Indonesia) Minarti Timur	4–11, 7–11	(silver) Runner-up
1990	German Open	(Denmark) Camilla Martin	12–9, 11–8	(gold) Winner
1991	Swedish Open	(Indonesia) Susi Susanti	2–11, 3–11	(silver) Runner-up
1991	German Open	(China) Huang Hua	1–11, 11–6, 7–11	(silver) Runner-up
1992	Finnish Open	(Russia) Elena Rybkina	11–1, 11–4	(gold) Winner
1993	Canada Open	(Denmark) Camilla Martin	5–11, 5–11	(silver) Runner-up
1993	Finnish Open	(Denmark) Camilla Martin	12–11, 11–12, 7–11	(silver) Runner-up
1994	Canada Open	(Indonesia) Meiluawati	11–6, 11–2	(gold) Winner

Mixed doubles
Year	Tournament	Partner	Opponent	Score	Result
1993	Scottish Open	(Denmark) Jon Holst-Christensen	(Denmark) Thomas Lund (Sweden) Catrine Bengtsson	2–15, 11–13	(silver) Runner-up

=== IBF International ===
Women's singles
Year	Tournament	Opponent	Score	Result
1985	French Open	(Sweden) Maria Henning	2–11, 7–11	(silver) Runner-up
1989	Stockholm International	(Soviet Union) Elena Rybkina	11–2, 11–8	(gold) Winner
1990	Nordic Championships	(Sweden) Catrine Bengtsson	11–6, 8–11, 12–10	(gold) Winner
1992	Nordic Championships	(Sweden) Christine Gandrup	11–7, 9–12, 1–11	(silver) Runner-up
1993	Hamburg Cup	(Denmark) Mette Pedersen	11–8, 11–1	(gold) Winner
1995	Hamburg Cup	(Denmark) Mette Pedersen	11–5, 11–5	(gold) Winner

Mixed doubles
Year	Tournament	Partner	Opponent	Score	Result
1985	French Open	(Denmark) B. Sørensen	(Denmark) Lars Noies (Denmark) Dorthe Lynge	9–15, 9–15	(silver) Runner-up

=== Invitation Tournament ===
Women's singles
Year	Tournament	Opponent	Score	Result
1995	Copenhagen Masters	(Denmark) Camilla Martin	2–11, 4–11	(silver) Runner-up
