= Lee Sang-bok =

South Korean badminton player

Personal information
- Born: 17 March 1968 (age 58)
- Height: 1.74 m (5 ft 9 in)

Sport
- Sport: Badminton
- Handedness: Right
- BWF profile
Medal record
Men's badminton
Representing South Korea
Sudirman Cup
Gold medal – first place	1991 Copenhagen	Mixed team
Silver medal – second place	1989 Jakarta	Mixed team
Thomas Cup
Bronze medal – third place	1992 Kuala Lumpur	Men's team
Asian Championships
Silver medal – second place	1991 Kuala Lumpur	Mixed doubles
Bronze medal – third place	1987 Semarang	Men's team

Korean name
- Hangul: 이상복
- Hanja: 李相福
- RR: I Sangbok
- MR: I Sangbok

Lee Sang-bok (Korean: 이상복; born 17 March 1968) is a retired badminton player from South Korea.

== Career ==
Lee competed in badminton at the 1992 Summer Olympics in the men's doubles with Shon Jin-hwan. They lost in quarterfinals to Rudy Gunawan and Eddy Hartono, of Indonesia, 4–15, 15–18. He was the silver medalist in the men's doubles discipline partnering Lee Gwang-jin at the 1988 Seoul Olympics when badminton was played as an exhibition sport. He also won a silver medal in 1988 Asian invitational meet with Park Joo-bong.

== Achievements ==
=== Olympic Games (Exhibition) ===
Men's doubles
Year	Venue	Partner	Opponent	Score	Result
1988	Seoul National University Gymnasium, Seoul, South Korea	(South Korea) Lee Kwang-jin	(China) Li Yongbo (China) Tian Bingyi	11–15, 7–15	Silver

=== Asian Championships ===
Mixed doubles
Year	Venue	Partner	Opponent	Score	Result
1991	Cheras Indoor Stadium, Kuala Lumpur, Malaysia	(South Korea) Chung So-young	(South Korea) Park Joo-bong (South Korea) Chung Myung-hee	7–15, 4–15	Silver

=== IBF World Grand Prix ===
The World Badminton Grand Prix sanctioned by International Badminton Federation (IBF) from 1983 to 2006.

Men's doubles
Year	Tournament	Partner	Opponent	Score	Result
1987	Canadian Open	(South Korea) Lee Deuk-choon	(Indonesia) Lius Pongoh (Indonesia) Richard Mainaky	11–15, 15–8, 15–13	(gold) Winner
1988	Hong Kong Open	(South Korea) Lee Kwang-jin	(Thailand) Sawei Chanseorasmee (Thailand) Sakrapee Thongsari	15–5, 17–14	(gold) Winner
1989	Japan Open	(South Korea) Park Joo-bong	(Sweden) Jan-Eric Antonsson (Sweden) Pär-Gunnar Jönsson	15–6, 15–5	(gold) Winner
1989	Swedish Open	(South Korea) Park Joo-bong	(China) Li Yongbo (China) Tian Bingyi	14–17, 2–15	(silver) Runner-up
1989	All England Open	(South Korea) Park Joo-bong	(Indonesia) Rudy Gunawan (Indonesia) Eddy Hartono	15–8, 15–7	(gold) Winner
1991	Hong Kong Open	(South Korea) Shon Jin-hwan	(China) Huang Zhanzhong (China) Zheng Yumin	7–15, 15–8, 15–11	(gold) Winner

Mixed Doubles
Year	Tournament	Partner	Opponent	Score	Result
1989	Japan Open	(South Korea) Chung So-young	(South Korea) Park Joo-bong (South Korea) Chung Myung-hee	3–15, 6–15	(silver) Runner-up
1991	Malaysia Open	(South Korea) Chung So-young	(Denmark) Thomas Lund (Denmark) Pernille Dupont	15–11, 15–8	(gold) Winner
1991	U.S. Open	(South Korea) Shim Eun-jung	(England) Nick Ponting (England) Gillian Gowers	18–14, 15–2	(gold) Winner
1991	Thailand Open	(South Korea) Chung So-young	(Thailand) Siripong Siripool (Thailand) Ladawan Mulasartsatorn	17–18, 15–4, 15–13	(gold) Winner
1991	Hong Kong Open	(South Korea) Shim Eun-jung	(South Korea) Shon Jin-hwan (South Korea) Gil Young-ah	17–15, 15–1	(gold) Winner
1992	Korea Open	(South Korea) Shim Eun-jung	(Denmark) Thomas Lund (Denmark) Pernille Dupont	11–15, 9–15	(silver) Runner-up
1992	Singapore Open	(South Korea) Gil Young-ah	(Sweden) Par-Gunnar Jonsson (Sweden) Maria Bengtsson	3–15, 10–15	(silver) Runner-up
1992	Hong Kong Open	(South Korea) Gil Young-ah	(Indonesia) Aryono Miranat (Indonesia) Eliza Nathanael	15–4, 15–11	(gold) Winner

=== IBF International ===
Men's Doubles
Year	Tournament	Partner	Opponent	Score	Result
1987	U.S. Open	(South Korea) Lee Deuk-choon	(Chinese Taipei) Ko Hsin-Ming (Chinese Taipei) Liao Wei-Chieh	15–2, 15–1	(gold) Winner
1988	Polish International	(South Korea) Park Joo-bong	(China) Fu Qiang (China) Li Jian	15–3, 15–9	(gold) Winner
1990	Hungarian International	(South Korea) Shon Jin-hwan	(South Korea) Ahn Jae-chang (South Korea) Lee Kwang-jin	17–14, 15–9	(gold) Winner

Mixed Doubles
Year	Tournament	Partner	Opponent	Score	Result
1990	Hungarian International	(South Korea) Hwang Hye-young	(South Korea) Shon Jin-hwan (South Korea) Park Kyung-hee	15–7, 15–9	(gold) Winner

=== Invitational tournament ===
Men's doubles
Year	Tournament	Partner	Opponent	Score	Result
1988	Asian Invitational Championships; Bandar Lampung, Indonesia	(South Korea) Park Joo-bong	(China) Zhang Qiang (China) Zhou Jincan	4–15, 6–15	Silver
