= Catrine Bengtsson =

Swedish badminton player (born 1969)

Personal information
- Born: 21 September 1969 (age 57) Gothenburg, Västra Götaland County, Sweden
- Height: 1.61 m (5 ft 3 in)

Sport
- Country: Sweden
- Sport: Badminton
- Handedness: Right
- Highest ranking: 1
- BWF profile
Medal record
Women's badminton
Representing Sweden
World Championships
Gold medal – first place	1993 Birmingham	Mixed doubles
World Cup
Gold medal – first place	1994 Ho Chi Minh	Mixed doubles
Uber Cup
Bronze medal – third place	1992 Kuala Lumpur	Women's team
Bronze medal – third place	1994 Jakarta	Women's team
European Championships
Gold medal – first place	1994 Den Bosch	Mixed doubles
Silver medal – second place	1994 Den Bosch	Women's singles
Bronze medal – third place	1992 Glasgow	Women's doubles
European Mixed Team Championships
Gold medal – first place	1992 Glasgow	Mixed team
Gold medal – first place	1994 Den Bosch	Mixed team
Silver medal – second place	1990 Moscow	Mixed team
Silver medal – second place	1996 Herning	Mixed team
European Junior Championships
Gold medal – first place	1987 Warsaw	Girls' doubles
Bronze medal – third place	1985 Pressbaum	Mixed team
Bronze medal – third place	1987 Warsaw	Girls' singles
Bronze medal – third place	1987 Warsaw	Mixed team

Catrine Bengtsson (born 21 September 1969) is a Swedish badminton player.

== Career ==
Bengtsson competed in badminton at the 1992 Summer Olympics in women's singles and women's doubles with Maria Bengtsson, and they lost in quarter-finals to Guan Weizhen and Nong Qunhua, of China, 15–4, 15–9. She also competed in the 1996 Summer Olympics in the three events: women's singles, women's doubles with Margit Borg and mixed doubles with Peter Axelsson.

In 1994, she won the European Championships in mixed doubles with Denmark's Michael Søgaard. In 1993 she claimed her biggest title, the IBF World Championship in mixed doubles with Denmark's Thomas Lund.

== Achievements ==
=== World Championships ===
Mixed doubles
Year	Venue	Partner	Opponent	Score	Result
1993	National Indoor Arena; Birmingham, England	(Denmark) Thomas Lund	(Denmark) Jon Holst-Christensen (Denmark) Grete Mogensen	10–15, 15–6, 15–12	Gold

=== World Cup ===
Mixed doubles
Year	Venue	Partner	Opponent	Score	Result
1994	Phan Đình Phùng Indoor Stadium; Ho Chi Minh City, Vietnam	(Denmark) Thomas Lund	(China) Chen Xingdong (China) Gu Jun	10–15, 15–10, 15–2	Gold

=== European Championships ===
Women's singles
Year	Venue	Opponent	Score	Result
1994	Maaspoort; Den Bosch, Netherlands	(Sweden) Lim Xiaoqing	5–11, 9–12	Silver

Women's doubles
Year	Venue	Partner	Opponent	Score	Result
1992	Kelvin Hall International Sports Arena; Glasgow, Scotland	(Sweden) Maria Bengtsson	(Denmark) Lisbet Stuer-Lauridsen (Denmark) Marlene Thomsen	15–9, 16–18, 3–15	Bronze

Mixed doubles
Year	Venue	Partner	Opponent	Score	Result
1994	Maaspoort; Den Bosch, Netherlands	(Denmark) Michael Søgaard	(Denmark) Christian Jakobsen (Denmark) Lotte Olsen	15–6, 15–9	Gold

=== European Junior Championships ===
Girls' singles
Year	Venue	Opponent	Score	Result
1987	Hali Mery; Warsaw, Poland	(Denmark) Helle Andersen	8–11, 11–4, 7–11	Bronze

Girls' doubles
Year	Venue	Partner	Opponent	Score	Result
1987	Hali Mery; Warsaw, Poland	(Sweden) Margit Borg	(England) Julie Munday (England) Tracy Dineen	15–4, 17–14	Gold

=== IBF World Grand Prix ===
The World Badminton Grand Prix was sanctioned by the International Badminton Federation from 1983 to 2006.

Women's singles
Year	Tournament	Opponent	Score	Result
1992	Swiss Open	(Netherlands) Astrid van der Knaap	11–1, 3–11, 9–11	(silver) Runner-up
1995	Scottish Open	(Canada) Doris Piché	8–11, 11–4, 11–9	(gold) Winner

Women's doubles
Year	Tournament	Partner	Opponent	Score	Result
1990	Scottish Open	(Sweden) Maria Bengtsson	(England) Gillian Clark (England) Gillian Gowers	18–16, 15–11	(gold) Winner
1991	Swedish Open	(Sweden) Maria Bengtsson	(England) Gillian Clark (Denmark) Nettie Nielsen	15–13, 9–15, 10–15	(silver) Runner-up
1991	Dutch Open	(Sweden) Maria Bengtsson	(England) Gillian Gowers (England) Sara Sankey	9–15, 16–18	(silver) Runner-up
1992	Swiss Open	(Sweden) Maria Bengtsson	(Germany) Katrin Schmidt (Germany) Kerstin Ubben	15–10, 15–10	(gold) Winner
1992	Swedish Open	(Sweden) Maria Bengtsson	(China) Lin Yanfen (China) Yao Fen	6–15, 16–17	(silver) Runner-up
1992	German Open	(Sweden) Maria Bengtsson	(Sweden) Lim Xiaoqing (Sweden) Christine Magnusson	9–15, 0–15	(silver) Runner-up
1992	Denmark Open	(Sweden) Maria Bengtsson	(Sweden) Lim Xiaoqing (Sweden) Christine Magnusson	7–15, 3–15	(silver) Runner-up
1992	Scottish Open	(Sweden) Maria Bengtsson	(Sweden) Lim Xiaoqing (Sweden) Christine Magnusson	6–15, 6–15	(silver) Runner-up
1995	Scottish Open	(Sweden) Maria Bengtsson	(England) Emma Constable (England) Sarah Hardaker	15–7, 15–5	(gold) Winner

Mixed doubles
Year	Tournament	Partner	Opponent	Score	Result
1992	Swedish Open	(Denmark) Max Gandrup	(Sweden) Pär-Gunnar Jönsson (Sweden) Maria Bengtsson	8–15, 12–15	(silver) Runner-up
1993	Japan Open	(Denmark) Thomas Lund	(Denmark) Christian Jakobsen (Denmark) Marlene Thomsen	15–6, 15–6	(gold) Winner
1993	Korea Open	(Denmark) Thomas Lund	(Denmark) Jon Holst-Christensen (Denmark) Anne Mette Bille	15–9, 12–15, 15–4	(gold) Winner
1993	Swedish Open	(Denmark) Thomas Lund	(Sweden) Peter Axelsson (England) Gillian Gowers	15–4, 15–10	(gold) Winner
1993	All England Open	(Denmark) Thomas Lund	(Denmark) Jon Holst-Christensen (Denmark) Grete Mogensen	1–8 retired	(silver) Runner-up
1993	Canadian Open	(Denmark) Thomas Lund	(Denmark) Christian Jakobsen (Denmark) Lotte Olsen	15–2, 15–9	(gold) Winner
1993	U. S. Open	(Denmark) Thomas Lund	(Denmark) Michael Søgaard (England) Gillian Gowers	15–7, 15–7	(gold) Winner
1993	Denmark Open	(Denmark) Thomas Lund	(Sweden) Jan-Eric Antonsson (Sweden) Astrid Crabo	15–4, 15–4	(gold) Winner
1993	Scottish Open	(Denmark) Thomas Lund	(Denmark) Jon Holst-Christensen (Denmark) Pernille Nedergaard	15–2, 13–11	(gold) Winner
1993	World Grand Prix Finals	(Denmark) Thomas Lund	(England) Nick Ponting (England) Gillian Clark	15–9, 15–7	(gold) Winner
1994	Japan Open	(Denmark) Jon Holst-Christensen	(Denmark) Michael Søgaard (England) Gillian Gowers	15–7, 15–9	(gold) Winner
1994	Swiss Open	(Denmark) Jon Holst-Christensen	(Sweden) Peter Axelsson (Denmark) Marlene Thomsen	13–18, 9–15	(silver) Runner-up
1996	Dutch Open	(Sweden) Peter Axelsson	(Sweden) Jan-Eric Antonsson (Sweden) Astrid Crabo	0–9, 7–9, 6–9	(silver) Runner-up

=== IBF International ===
Women's singles
Year	Tournament	Opponent	Score	Result
1988	USSR International	(Soviet Union) Vlada Chernyavskaya	11–9, 11–5	(gold) Winner
1990	Nordic Championships	(Denmark) Pernille Nedergaard	6–11, 11–8, 10–12	(silver) Runner-up
1992	Norwegian International	(Denmark) Helle Andersen	12–9, 11–7	(gold) Winner
1993	Norwegian International	(Sweden) Karin Ericsson	11–4, 11–5	(gold) Winner

Women's doubles
Year	Tournament	Partner	Opponent	Score	Result
1988	Nordic Championships	(Sweden) Maria Bengtsson	(Denmark) Dorte Kjær (Denmark) Nettie Nielsen	18–14, 4–15, 8–15	(silver) Runner-up
1993	Norwegian International	(Sweden) Kristin Evernäs	(Denmark) Helene Kirkegaard (Denmark) Rikke Olsen	Walkover	(gold) Winner
1998	Norwegian International	(Sweden) Marina Andrievskaya	(Hong Kong) Koon Wai Chee (Hong Kong) Ling Wan Ting	12–15, 15–6, 15–13	(gold) Winner
1998	Welsh International	(Sweden) Marina Andrievskaya	(England) Felicity Gallup (England) Joanne Muggeridge	15–8, 15–3	(gold) Winner

Mixed doubles
Year	Tournament	Partner	Opponent	Score	Result
1998	Welsh International	(Sweden) Henrik Andersson	(Republic of Ireland) Donal O'Halloran (Republic of Ireland) Elaine Kiely	15–2, 15–7	(gold) Winner
