= Tomas Johansson (badminton) =

Swedish badminton player

Personal information
- Born: Sven Tomas Johansson; 12 August 1969 (age 57) Västra Frölunda, Gothenburg, Sweden
- Height: 1.99 m (6 ft 6 in)
- Weight: 85 kg (187 lb)

Sport
- Country: Sweden
- Sport: Badminton
- Handedness: Right
- Event: Men's singles

Men's singles
- BWF profile
Medal record
Men's badminton
Representing Sweden
European Championships
Gold medal – first place	1994 Den Bosch	Mixed team
Silver medal – second place	1994 Den Bosch	Men's singles

Sven Tomas Johansson (born 12 August 1969) is a former Swedish badminton player. He competed at the 1996 and 2000 Summer Olympics in the men's singles event. Play for Västra Frölunda BMK, Johansson was two times men's singles National Champion in 1993 and 2000. Johansson was the men's singles silver medalist at the 1994 European Championships, also won the gold medal in the mixed team event.

== Achievements ==
=== European Championships ===
Men's singles
Year	Venue	Opponent	Score	Result
1994	Maaspoort Sports & Events; Den Bosch, Netherlands	(Denmark) Poul-Erik Høyer Larsen	9–15, 5–15	Silver

=== IBF World Grand Prix ===
The World Badminton Grand Prix sanctioned by International Badminton Federation (IBF) since 1983.

Men's singles
Year	Tournament	Opponent	Score	Result
1998	Dutch Open	(Malaysia) Roslin Hashim	12–15, 6–15	(silver) Runner-up
1996	Swiss Open	(Denmark) Poul-Erik Høyer Larsen	9–15, 17–16, 10–15	(silver) Runner-up
1995	French Open	(Indonesia) George Rimarcdi	15–10, 9–15, 4–15	(silver) Runner-up
1994	Scottish Open	(Sweden) Rikard Magnusson	17–15, 15–0	(gold) Winner

=== IBF International ===
Men's singles
Year	Tournament	Opponent	Score	Result
1995	Victor Cup	(Sweden) Rikard Magnusson	15–18, 15–3, 15–1	(gold) Winner
1994	Irish International	(Sweden) Rikard Magnusson	15–7, 11–15, 11–15	(silver) Runner-up
1993	Irish International	(England) Darren Hall	Walkover	(silver) Runner-up
1993	Norwegian International	(Sweden) Henrik Bengtsson	No match	(silver) Runner-up
1993	Uppsala International	(Sweden) Patrik Andreasson	4–15, 15–5, 15–9	(gold) Winner
1993	Austrian International	(Netherlands) Chris Bruil	10–15, 12–15	(silver) Runner-up
