= Anders Nielsen (badminton) =

British badminton player

Personal information
- Full name: Anders Ward Nielsen
- Born: 24 February 1967 Cape Town, Western Cape, South Africa
- Died: 29 July 2010 (aged 43) Cheam, Greater London, England
- Height: 173 cm (5 ft 8 in)
- Weight: 70 kg (154 lb)

Sport
- Country: England
- Sport: Badminton
Medal record
Men's badminton
Representing England
Commonwealth Games
Gold medal – first place	1994 Victoria	Mixed team
Bronze medal – third place	1994 Victoria	Men's singles
European Championships
Bronze medal – third place	1992 Glasgow	Men's singles
Bronze medal – third place	1994 Den Bosch	Men's singles
European Mixed Team Championships
Bronze medal – third place	1992 Glasgow	Mixed team
Bronze medal – third place	1994 Den Bosch	Mixed team
European Junior Championships
Silver medal – second place	1985 Pressbaum	Mixed team

Anders Ward Nielsen (24 February 1967 – 29 July 2010) was a badminton player who competed for England.

== Badminton career ==
Nielsen represented Great Britain in the 1992 Summer Olympics in Barcelona.

He represented England and won a gold medal in the mixed team and a bronze medal in the men's singles event, at the 1994 Commonwealth Games in Victoria, British Columbia, Canada.

He represented England 40 times between 1987 and 1996 and won bronze in the 1992 and 1994 European Badminton Championships. He was twice the English National champion in 1992 and 1995. He died of cancer in 2010.

== Family ==
His mother was Heather Ward, the 1958 women's doubles and 1959 women's singles All England Open Badminton Championships winner.

== Achievements ==
=== Commonwealth Games ===
Men's singles
Year	Venue	Opponent	Score	Result
1994	McKinnon Gym, University of Victoria; British Columbia, Canada	(Malaysia) Rashid Sidek	3–15, 11–15	Bronze

=== European Championships ===
Men's singles
Year	Venue	Opponent	Score	Result
1992	Kelvin Hall International Sports Arena; Glasgow, Scotland	(Denmark) Thomas Stuer-Lauridsen	15–8, 7–15, 13–15	Bronze
1994	Maaspoort; Den Bosch, Netherlands	(Sweden) Tomas Johansson	14–17, 6–15	Bronze

=== IBF World Grand Prix ===
The World Badminton Grand Prix was sanctioned by the International Badminton Federation from 1983 to 2006.

Men's singles
Year	Tournament	Opponent	Score	Result
1989	Canada Open	(England) Matthew A. Smith	15–4, 15–1	(gold) Winner
1990	Scottish Open	(Denmark) Ib Frederiksen	15–18, 7–15	(silver) Runner-up

=== IBF International ===
Men's singles
Year	Tournament	Opponent	Score	Result
1986	Welsh International	(England) Darren Hall	11–15, 1–15	(silver) Runner-up
1987	Polish International	(China) Zheng Shoutai	15–13, 15–4	(gold) Winner
1991	Portugal International	(England) Matthew A. Smith	10–15, 15–8, 15–9	(gold) Winner
1991	Wimbledon International	(Denmark) Poul-Erik Hoyer Larsen	7–15, 9–15	(silver) Runner-up
1992	La Chaux-de-Fonds International	(Canada) Bryan Blanshard	15–5, 15–9	(gold) Winner
1992	Wimbledon International	(England) Darren Hall	8–15, 12–15	(silver) Runner-up
1992	Welsh International	(England) Peter Knowles	15–10, 15–10	(gold) Winner
1995	Bulgarian International	(United States) Kevin Han	15–9, 15–4	(gold) Winner
1996	Finnish Open	(Sweden) Rikard Magnusson	6–15, 8–15	(silver) Runner-up
