= Lisbet Stuer-Lauridsen =

Danish badminton player

Personal information
- Born: 22 September 1968 (age 58) Virum, Denmark
- Height: 170 cm (5 ft 7 in)
- Weight: 71 kg (157 lb)

Sport
- Country: Denmark
- Sport: Badminton
- Handedness: Right

Women's singles and doubles
- Highest ranking: 20 (WS); 1 (WD with Lotte Olsen) (17/1/1994)
- BWF profile
Medal record
Women's badminton
Representing Denmark
World Championships
| Bronze medal – third place | 1993 Birmingham | Women's doubles |
World Cup
| Bronze medal – third place | 1994 Ho Chi Minh | Women's doubles |
Sudirman Cup
| Bronze medal – third place | 1993 Birmingham | Mixed team |
| Bronze medal – third place | 1995 Lausanne | Mixed team |
| Bronze medal – third place | 1997 Glasgow | Mixed team |
Uber Cup
| Bronze medal – third place | 1996 Hong Kong | Women's team |
European Championships
| Gold medal – first place | 1996 Herning | Women's doubles |
| Silver medal – second place | 1992 Glasgow | Women's doubles |
| Silver medal – second place | 1994 Dan Bosch | Women's doubles |
European Mixed Team Championships
| Gold medal – first place | 1996 Herning | Mixed team |
| Silver medal – second place | 1992 Glasgow | Mixed team |
| Silver medal – second place | 1994 Dan Bosch | Mixed team |
European Junior Championships
| Gold medal – first place | 1985 Pressbaum | Girls' singles |
| Gold medal – first place | 1985 Pressbaum | Girls' doubles |
| Gold medal – first place | 1985 Pressbaum | Mixed team |

Lisbet Stuer-Lauridsen (born 22 September 1968) is a Danish former professional badminton player who competed at the 1992 and 1996 Summer Olympics. She is the sister of Thomas Stuer-Lauridsen, another male badminton player for Denmark.

== Career ==
During the early 90's, Lisbet was a Denmark women badminton players in both singles and doubles. In singles the best she achieved was a semifinal appearance in Scottish Open, and a quarter final appearance in her home Grand Prix, Denmark Open. In doubles since she won one bronze each in both 1993 World Championships and 1994 World Cup with Lotte Olsen. Lisbet won the Denmark Open in 1993 and 1995, the Malaysia Open in 1996 and became the European champion with Marlene Thomsen in 1996 by beating her compatriots, Helene Kirkegaard and Rikke Olsen 6–15, 15–12, 15–10. She became the world number 1 in women's doubles with Lotte Olsen in 1994 and retired from the sport in 1997 due to prolonged injuries and wear and tear of the body due to the consistent training and travels.

== Playing style ==
Lisbet was a player who possessed strong mental and technical strength. She was a hard hitter that able to place her smash accurately and it was difficult to return.

== Personal life ==
Lisbet is a managing director in a company that specialized in pet-euthanasia. She still follows the development of the sports and had vouched for a better salaries and proper trainings being provided by Badminton Denmark.

== Major achievements ==
=== World Championships ===
Women's Doubles
| Year | Venue | Partner | Opponent | Score | Result |
|---|---|---|---|---|---|
| 1993 | National Indoor Arena; Birmingham, England | (Denmark) Lotte Olsen | (China) Nong Qunhua (China) Zhou Lei | 2–15, 13–15 | Bronze |

=== World Cup ===
Women's doubles
| Year | Venue | Partner | Opponent | Score | Result |
|---|---|---|---|---|---|
| 1994 | Phan Đình Phùng Indoor Stadium; Ho Chi Minh, Vietnam | (Denmark) Lotte Olsen | (Indonesia) Finarsih (Indonesia) Lili Tampi | 3–15, 5–15 | Bronze |

=== European Championships ===
Women's doubles
| Year | Venue | Partner | Opponent | Score | Result |
|---|---|---|---|---|---|
| 1992 | Kelvin Hall International Sports Arena; Glasgow, Scotland | (Denmark) Marlene Thomsen | (Sweden) Lim Xiaoqing (Sweden) Christine Magnusson | 15–8, 11–15, 6–15 | Silver |
| 1994 | Maaspoort; Den Bosch, Netherlands | (Denmark) Lotte Olsen | (Sweden) Lim Xiaoqing (Sweden) Christine Magnusson | 14–17, 12–15 | Silver |
| 1996 | Herning Badminton Klub; Herning, Denmark | (Denmark) Marlene Thomsen | (Denmark) Rikke Olsen (Denmark) Helene Kirkegaard | 6–15, 15–12, 15–10 | Gold |

=== European Junior Championships ===
Girls' singles
| Year | Venue | Opponent | Score | Result |
|---|---|---|---|---|
| 1985 | Sacré Coeur Cloister Hall; Pressbaum, Austria | (Denmark) Lotte Olsen | 11–5, 11–6 | Gold |

Girls' doubles
| Year | Venue | Partner | Opponent | Score | Result |
|---|---|---|---|---|---|
| 1985 | Sacré Coeur Cloister Hall; Pressbaum, Austria | (Denmark) Lotte Olsen | (England) Debbie Hore (England) Sara Halsall | 15–11, 9–15, 15–7 | Gold |

=== IBF World Grand Prix ===
The World Badminton Grand Prix was sanctioned by the International Badminton Federation (IBF) from 1983 to 2006.

Women's doubles
| Year | Tournament | Partner | Opponent | Score | Result |
|---|---|---|---|---|---|
| 1990 | Dutch Open | (Denmark) Nettie Nielsen | (Sweden) Maria Bengtsson (Sweden) Christine Magnusson | 15–9, 15–11 | (gold) Winner |
| 1991 | Scottish Open | (England) Joanne Muggeridge | (Sweden) Lim Xiaoqing (Sweden) Christine Magnusson | 0–15, 5–15 | (silver) Runner-up |
| 1992 | Finnish Open | (Denmark) Marlene Thomsen | (Russia) Natalya Ivanova (Russia) Elena Rybkina | 15–7, 15–9 | (gold) Winner |
| 1993 | Malaysia Open | (Denmark) Lotte Olsen | (Sweden) Lim Xiaoqing (Sweden) Christine Magnusson | 12–15, 14–18 | (silver) Runner-up |
| 1993 | Canada Open | (Denmark) Lotte Olsen | (Sweden) Lim Xiaoqing (Sweden) Christine Magnusson | 11–15, 5–15 | (silver) Runner-up |
| 1993 | Denmark Open | (Denmark) Lotte Olsen | (Japan) Tokiko Hirota (Japan) Yuki Koike | 15–4, 15–2 | (gold) Winner |
| 1993 | Scottish Open | (Denmark) Lotte Olsen | (Denmark) Anne-Mette van Dijk (Denmark) Marlene Thomsen | 11–15, 15–10, 15–7 | (gold) Winner |
| 1994 | Chinese Taipei Open | (Denmark) Lotte Olsen | (Indonesia) Finarsih (Indonesia) Lili Tampi | 9–15, 4–15 | (silver) Runner-up |
| 1994 | Swiss Open | (Denmark) Lotte Olsen | (Denmark) Anne-Mette van Dijk (Denmark) Marlene Thomsen | 15–6, 3–15, 15–4 | (gold) Winner |
| 1995 | Chinese Taipei Open | (England) Gillian Gowers | (Denmark) Helene Kirkegaard (Denmark) Rikke Olsen | 5–15, 5–15 | (silver) Runner-up |
| 1995 | Denmark Open | (Denmark) Marlene Thomsen | (Denmark) Helene Kirkegaard (Denmark) Rikke Olsen | 15–11, 15–11 | (gold) Winner |
| 1996 | Swiss Open | (Denmark) Marlene Thomsen | (Denmark) Helene Kirkegaard (Denmark) Rikke Olsen | 15–10, 15–10 | (gold) Winner |
| 1996 | Malaysia Open | (Denmark) Marlene Thomsen | (China) Liu Lu (China) Qian Hong | 10–15, 17–15, 17–15 | (gold) Winner |
| 1996 | Hong Kong Open | (Denmark) Marlene Thomsen | (Indonesia) Indarti Issolina (Indonesia) Deyana Lomban | 15–9, 15–12 | (gold) Winner |
| 1996 | Thailand Open | (Denmark) Marlene Thomsen | (Indonesia) Indarti Issolina (Indonesia) Deyana Lomban | 9–15, 4–15 | (silver) Runner-up |
| 1997 | German Open | (Denmark) Marlene Thomsen | (Denmark) Helene Kirkegaard (Denmark) Rikke Olsen | 15–4, 5–15, 8–15 | (silver) Runner-up |

=== IBF International ===
Women's doubles
| Year | Tournament | Partner | Opponent | Score | Result |
|---|---|---|---|---|---|
| 1990 | Nordic Championships | (Denmark) Nettie Nielsen | (Denmark) Dorte Kjær (Denmark) Lotte Olsen | 8–15, 7–15 | (silver) Runner-up |
| 1992 | Amor Tournament | (Denmark) Marlene Thomsen | (Germany) Katrin Schmidt (Germany) Kerstin Ubben | 10–15, 15–13, 15–3 | (gold) Winner |
