= Darren Hall (badminton) =

British badminton player (born 1965)

Personal information
- Born: Darren James Hall; 25 October 1965 (age 61) Walthamstow, Greater London, England
- Height: 1.83 m (6 ft 0 in)
- Weight: 73 kg (161 lb)

Sport
- Country: England
- Sport: Badminton
- Handedness: Right
- BWF profile
Medal record
Men's badminton
Representing England
World Cup
Bronze medal – third place	1996 Jakarta	Men's singles
Commonwealth Games
Gold medal – first place	1990 Auckland	Mixed team
Bronze medal – third place	1990 Auckland	Men's singles
Bronze medal – third place	1998 Kuala Lumpur	Men's singles
Bronze medal – third place	1998 Kuala Lumpur	Men's team
European Championships
Gold medal – first place	1988 Kristiansand	Men's singles
Silver medal – second place	1990 Moscow	Men's singles
European Mixed Team Championships
Bronze medal – third place	1990 Moscow	Mixed team
Bronze medal – third place	1988 Kristiansand	Mixed team
European Junior Championships
Gold medal – first place	1983 Helsinki	Mixed team
Bronze medal – third place	1983 Helsinki	Boys' doubles

Darren James Hall (born 25 October 1965) is an English retired badminton player who is generally rated as one of the best men's singles players that England has produced and holds the record of 10 National singles titles.

== Career ==
Hall won a record ten English national singles titles from 1986 until 1999. During the 1993 championships he broke the existing record of five, set in 1981 by his cousin Ray Stevens.

He is the only Englishman since the 1930s to win the prestigious Danish Open (1992) in the men's singles. He won the singles gold medal at the 1988 European Badminton Championships, defeating Morten Frost in the final.

Hall represented England in a demonstration of badminton at the 1988 Summer Olympics in Seoul, South Korea. He then competed in 1992 Summer Olympics in the men's singles. He lost in the second round to Zhao Jianhua, of China, 6–15, 9–15. In 1996, he played in the singles and doubles event. In the singles, he lost to Lee Gwang-jin of South Korea in the second round, 7–15, 11–15, and in the doubles event with Peter Knowles, they were defeated by Chinese pair Ge Cheng and Tao Xiaoqiang, 2–15, 3–15.

Hall competed at the Commonwealth Games in 1990 and 1998, and has collected a gold and three bronze medals.

== Achievements ==
=== World Cup ===
Men's singles
Year	Venue	Opponent	Score	Result
1996	Istora Senayan; Jakarta, Indonesia	(Indonesia) Jeffer Rosobin	15–9, 14–17, 9–14	Bronze

=== Commonwealth Games ===
Men's singles
Year	Venue	Opponent	Score	Result
1990	Auckland Badminton Hall; Auckland, New Zealand	(England) Steve Baddeley	Walkover	Bronze
1998	Kuala Lumpur Badminton Stadium; Kuala Lumpur, Malaysia	(Malaysia) Yong Hock Kin	7–15, 1–15	Bronze

=== European Championships ===
Men's singles
Year	Venue	Opponent	Score	Result
1988	Badmintonsenteret; Kristiansand, Norway	(Denmark) Morten Frost	8–15, 15–12, 15–9	Gold
1990	Minor Arena of the Central Lenin Stadium; Moscow, Soviet Union	(England) Steve Baddeley	15–11, 3–15, 7–15	Silver

=== European Junior Championships ===
Boys' doubles
Year	Venue	Partner	Opponent	Score	Result
1983	Helsinkian Sports Hall; Helsinki, Finland	(England) Stuart Spurling	(Denmark) Karsten Schultz (Denmark) Claus Thomsen	14–17, 8–15	Bronze

=== IBF World Grand Prix ===
The World Badminton Grand Prix was sanctioned by the International Badminton Federation from 1983 to 2006.

Men's singles
Year	Tournament	Opponent	Score	Result
1987	Dutch Open	(Denmark) Poul-Erik Høyer Larsen	4–15, 1–15	(silver) Runner-up
1987	German Open	(Denmark) Ib Frederiksen	17–16, 4–15, 15–6	(gold) Winner
1987	Hong Kong Open	(China) Xiong Guobao	15–6, 4–15, 10–15	(silver) Runner-up
1987	Denmark Open	(Denmark) Torben Carlsen	7–15, 4–15	(silver) Runner-up
1991	Scottish Open	(Sweden) Jens Olsson	11–15, 15–9, 15–1	(gold) Winner
1992	Denmark Open	(Denmark) Poul-Erik Høyer Larsen	15–11, 18–13	(gold) Winner

=== IBF International ===
Men's singles
Year	Tournament	Opponent	Score	Result
1984	Welsh International	(Denmark) Morten Frost	2–15, 6–15	(silver) Runner-up
1984	Victor Cup	(Indonesia) Lius Pongoh	6–15, 2–15	(silver) Runner-up
1985	Welsh International	(Denmark) Poul-Erik Høyer Larsen	18–16, 15–5	(gold) Winner
1986	Welsh International	(England) Anders Nielsen	15–11, 15–1	(gold) Winner
1988	Welsh International	(Wales) Chris Rees	15–5, 5–1 retired	(gold) Winner
1992	Wimbledon Open	(England) Anders Nielsen	15–8, 15–12	(gold) Winner
1993	Welsh International	(England) Peter Knowles	14–17, 15–6, 15–5	(gold) Winner
1993	Irish International	(Sweden) Tomas Johansson	Walkover	(gold) Winner
1997	Irish International	(Sweden) Daniel Eriksson	15–12, 15–4	(gold) Winner
1998	Portugal International	(Denmark) Niels Christian Kaldau	16–18, 9–15	(silver) Runner-up
1998	Scottish International	(Finland) Pontus Jäntti	13–15, 8–15	(silver) Runner-up
1998	Irish International	(England) Mark Constable	15–7, 15–11	(gold) Winner
1999	Irish International	(England) Peter Knowles	9–15, 4–15	(silver) Runner-up

Men's doubles
Year	Tournament	Partner	Opponent	Score	Result
1982	Portugal International	(England) Ray Stevens	(Scotland) Billy Gilliland (Scotland) Dan Travers	15–13, 15–8	(gold) Winner
