= Lim Xiaoqing =

Chinese badminton player (born 1967)

Lim Xiaoqing 林小青
Personal information
- Born: Sun Xiaoqing 孫小青; 15 August 1967 (age 59) China
- Height: 1.67 m (5 ft 6 in)

Sport
- Country: Sweden
- Sport: Badminton
- Handedness: Left

Women's singles & doubles
- Highest ranking: 1 (WS) (March 1995)
- BWF profile
Medal record
Women's badminton
Representing Sweden
World Cup
Gold medal – first place	1993 New Delhi	Women's doubles
Silver medal – second place	1993 New Delhi	Women's singles
Bronze medal – third place	1995 Jakarta	Women's singles
Uber Cup
Bronze medal – third place	1994 Jakarta	Women's team
Bronze medal – third place	1992 Kuala Lumpur	Women's team
European Championships
Gold medal – first place	1994 Den Bosch	Women's singles
Gold medal – first place	1994 Den Bosch	Women's doubles
Gold medal – first place	1994 Den Bosch	Mixed team
Gold medal – first place	1992 Glasgow	Women's doubles
Gold medal – first place	1992 Glasgow	Mixed team
Bronze medal – third place	1992 Glasgow	Women's singles
Representing China
World Championships
Bronze medal – third place	1989 Jakarta	Women's doubles
World Cup
Bronze medal – third place	1989 Guangzhou	Women's doubles

Lim Xiaoqing (Chinese: 林小青; born 15 August 1967 as Sun Xiaoqing; Chinese: 孫小青) is a retired badminton player originally from China who later represented Sweden. She won five European Badminton Championships, one in women's singles in 1994, two in women's doubles and mixed team events in 1992 and 1994 respectively. She achieved the women's singles titles at the prestigious 1995 All England Open, defeating Denmark's Camilla Martin in the final. She ranked as the World's number 1 in Women's Singles last March 1995.

Lim is married to retired Swedish badminton player Thomas Kihlström.

== Achievements ==
=== World Championships ===
Women's doubles
Year	Venue	Partner	Opponent	Score	Result
1989	Istora Senayan; Jakarta, Indonesia	(China) Zhou Lei	(South Korea) Chung Myung-hee (South Korea) Hwang Hye-young	15–13, 1–15, 4–15	Bronze

=== World Cup ===
Women's singles
Year	Venue	Opponent	Score	Result
1993	Indira Gandhi Arena; New Delhi, India	(Indonesia) Susi Susanti	7–11, 5–11	Silver
1995	Istora Senayan; Jakarta, Indonesia	(Indonesia) Susi Susanti	2–11, 5–11	Bronze

Women's doubles
Year	Venue	Partner	Opponent	Score	Result
1989	Guangzhou Gymnasium; Guangzhou, China	(China) Zhou Lei	(China) Lin Ying (China) Guan Weizhen	7–15, 4–15	Bronze
1993	Indira Gandhi Arena; New Delhi, India	(Sweden) Christine Magnusson	(South Korea) Chung So-young (South Korea) Gil Young-ah	15–12, 15–9	Gold

=== European Championships ===
Women's singles
Year	Venue	Opponent	Score	Result
1992	Kelvin Hall International Sports Arena; Glasgow, Scotland	(Denmark) Camilla Martin	7–11, 10–12	Bronze
1994	Maaspoort; Den Bosch, Netherlands	(Sweden) Catrine Bengtsson	11–5, 12–9	Gold

Women's doubles
Year	Venue	Partner	Opponent	Score	Result
1992	Kelvin Hall International Sports Arena; Glasgow, Scotland	(Sweden) Christine Magnusson	(Denmark) Lisbet Stuer-Lauridsen (Denmark) Marlene Thomsen	8–15, 15–11, 15–6	Gold
1994	Maaspoort; Den Bosch, Netherlands	(Sweden) Christine Magnusson	(Denmark) Lotte Olsen (Denmark) Lisbet Stuer-Lauridsen	17–14, 15–12	Gold

=== IBF World Grand Prix ===
The World Badminton Grand Prix was sanctioned by the International Badminton Federation from 1983 to 2006.

Women's singles
Year	Tournament	Opponent	Score	Result
1989	Swedish Open	(China) Li Lingwei	8–11, 3–11	(silver) Runner-up
1991	Scottish Open	(Sweden) Christine Magnusson	11–0, 11–3	(gold) Winner
1992	Swedish Open	(China) Tang Jiuhong	5–11, 4–11	(silver) Runner-up
1992	U.S. Open	(Sweden) Christine Magnusson	11–2, 11–2	(gold) Winner
1992	Dutch Open	(Indonesia) Sarwendah Kusumawardhani	4–11, 8–11	(silver) Runner-up
1992	Denmark Open	(Indonesia) Susi Susanti	3–11, 3–11	(silver) Runner-up
1992	Scottish Open	(Sweden) Christine Magnusson	11–9, 11–2	(gold) Winner
1993	Chinese Taipei Open	(Indonesia) Yuliani Santosa	11–6, 9–12, 11–5	(gold) Winner
1993	Swiss Open	(Indonesia) Yuliani Santosa	6–11, 7–11	(silver) Runner-up
1993	Malaysia Open	(Indonesia) Susi Susanti	6–11, 2–11	(silver) Runner-up
1993	U.S. Open	(Sweden) Christine Magnusson	11–5, 11–0	(gold) Winner
1994	Dutch Open	(China) Liu Yuhong	11–3, 12–9	(gold) Winner
1994	German Open	(China) Dai Yun	12–10, 11–4	(gold) Winner
1994	Denmark Open	(Denmark) Camilla Martin	5–11, 11–5, 11–12	(silver) Runner-up
1994	Thailand Open	(Indonesia) Susi Susanti	5–11, 10–12	(silver) Runner-up
1994	Hong Kong Open	(South Korea) Bang Soo-hyun	7–11, 8–11	(silver) Runner-up
1994	Scottish Open	(England) Julia Mann	11–3, 11–0	(gold) Winner
1995	Chinese Taipei Open	(Indonesia) Yuliani Santosa	11–1, 11–5	(gold) Winner
1995	Swiss Open	(Denmark) Camilla Martin	7–11, 7–11	(silver) Runner-up
1995	Swedish Open	(China) Ye Zhaoying	6–11, 6–11	(silver) Runner-up
1995	All England Open	(Denmark) Camilla Martin	11–9, 10–12, 11–7	(gold) Winner
1995	Singapore Open	(South Korea) Bang Soo-hyun	11–7, 6–11, 11–8	(gold) Winner
1995	Denmark Open	(China) Wang Chen	11–6, 11–3	(gold) Winner
1995	Thailand Open	(South Korea) Ra Kyung-min	11–4, 11–0	(gold) Winner
1995	World Grand Prix Finals	(China) Ye Zhaoying	10–12, 11–8, 8–11	(silver) Runner-up

Women's doubles
Year	Tournament	Partner	Opponent	Score	Result
1988	China Open	(China) Zhou Lei	(China) Guan Weizhen (China) Lin Ying	8–15, 4–15	(silver) Runner-up
1989	All England Open	(China) Zhou Lei	(South Korea) Chung Myung-hee (South Korea) Chung So-young	7–15, 4–15	(silver) Runner-up
1989	French Open	(China) Zhou Lei	(China) Chiu Mei Yin (China) Li Lingwei	15–9, 15–10	(gold) Winner
1989	China Open	(China) Zhou Lei	(China) Guan Weizhen (China) Lin Ying	15–12, 5–15, 4–15	(silver) Runner-up
1991	Singapore Open	(Sweden) Christine Magnusson	(South Korea) Chung Myung-hee (South Korea) Chung So-young	11–15, 3–15	(silver) Runner-up
1991	German Open	(Sweden) Christine Magnusson	(China) Lin Yanfen (China) Yao Fen	15–11, 17–15	(gold) Winner
1991	Scottish Open	(Sweden) Christine Magnusson	(England) Joanne Muggeridge (Denmark) Lisbet Stuer-Lauridsen	11–0, 11–5	(gold) Winner
1992	Malaysia Open	(Sweden) Christine Magnusson	(South Korea) Gil Young-ah (South Korea) Park Soo-yun	15–7, 15–9	(gold) Winner
1992	U.S. Open	(Sweden) Christine Magnusson	(Japan) Kimiko Jinnai (Japan) Hisako Mori	15–4, 15–9	(gold) Winner
1992	German Open	(Sweden) Christine Magnusson	(Sweden) Catrine Bengtsson (Sweden) Maria Bengtsson	15–9, 15–0	(gold) Winner
1992	Denmark Open	(Sweden) Christine Magnusson	(Sweden) Catrine Bengtsson (Sweden) Maria Bengtsson	15–7, 15–3	(gold) Winner
1992	Scottish Open	(Sweden) Christine Magnusson	(Sweden) Catrine Bengtsson (Sweden) Maria Bengtsson	15–6, 15–6	(gold) Winner
1993	Chinese Taipei Open	(Sweden) Christine Magnusson	(Japan) Tomomi Matsuo (Japan) Kyoko Sasage	18–15, 18–13	(gold) Winner
1993	Swedish Open	(Sweden) Christine Magnusson	(South Korea) Chung So-young (South Korea) Gil Young-ah	9–15, 11–15	(silver) Runner-up
1993	Malaysia Open	(Sweden) Christine Magnusson	(Denmark) Lotte Olsen (Denmark) Lisbet Stuer-Lauridsen	15–12, 18–14	(gold) Winner
1993	U.S. Open	(Sweden) Christine Magnusson	(South Korea) Chung So-young (South Korea) Gil Young-ah	5–15, 4–15	(silver) Runner-up
1993	Canadian Open	(Sweden) Christine Magnusson	(Denmark) Lotte Olsen (Denmark) Lisbet Stuer-Lauridsen	15–11, 15–5	(gold) Winner
1994	Denmark Open	(Sweden) Christine Magnusson	(Denmark) Marlene Thomsen (Denmark) Anne-Mette van Dijk	15–12, 7–15, 15–12	(gold) Winner

=== IBF International ===
Women's singles
Year	Tournament	Opponent	Score	Result
1990	Stockholm International	(Denmark) Helle Andersen	11–4, 11–5	(gold) Winner
1991	Iceland International	(Iceland) Birna Petersen	11–0, 11–0	(gold) Winner

Women's doubles
Year	Tournament	Partner	Opponent	Score	Result
1985	Polish International	(China) Shi Fangjing	(China) Luo Yun (China) Shang Fumei	15–3, 10–15, 15–7	(gold) Winner
1991	Iceland International	(Iceland) Kristín Magnúsdóttir	(Iceland) Guðrún Júlíusdóttir (Iceland) Birna Petersen	2–15, 12–15	(silver) Runner-up

Mixed doubles
Year	Tournament	Partner	Opponent	Score	Result
1985	Polish International	(China) Shu Yiong	(China) Wang Pengren (China) Shi Fangjing	7–15, 6–15	(silver) Runner-up
1991	Iceland International	(Iceland) Broddi Kristjánsson	(Iceland) Þorsteinn Páll Hængsson (Iceland) Kristín Magnúsdóttir	8–15, 18–16, 15–3	(gold) Winner

=== Nordic Championships ===
Women's singles
Year	Venue	Opponent	Score	Result
1995	Reykjavík, Iceland	(Sweden) Christine Magnusson	11–4, 11–12, 12–11	(gold) Winner

Women's doubles
Year	Venue	Partner	Opponent	Score	Result
1992	Malmö, Sweden	(Sweden) Christine Magnusson	(Denmark) Lotte Olsen (Denmark) Marlene Thomsen	15–6, 15–13	(gold) Winner

=== Invitational tournament ===
Women's doubles
Year	Tournament	Partner	Opponent	Score	Result
1988	Asian Invitational Championships; Bandar Lampung, Indonesia	(China) Zhou Lei	(South Korea) Chung Myung-hee (South Korea) Hwang Hye-young	15–11, 8–15, 5–15	Bronze
