= Grete Mogensen =

Danish badminton player

Personal information
- Born: 15 May 1963 (age 63) Skive, Midtjylland, Denmark
- Height: 1.63 m (5 ft 4 in)

Sport
- Country: Denmark
- Sport: Badminton
- Handedness: Right
- BWF profile
Medal record
Women's badminton
Representing Denmark
World Championships
Silver medal – second place	1993 Birmingham	Mixed doubles
Bronze medal – third place	1991 Copenhagen	Mixed doubles
Sudirman Cup
Bronze medal – third place	1991 Copenhagen	Mixed team
Bronze medal – third place	1993 Birmingham	Mixed team
European Championships
Gold medal – first place	1990 Moscow	Mixed doubles
Silver medal – second place	1992 Glasgow	Mixed doubles
European Mixed Team Championships
Gold medal – first place	1990 Moscow	Mixed team
Silver medal – second place	1992 Glasgow	Mixed team

Grete Mogensen (born 15 May 1963, later Grete Kragekjær) is a retired female badminton player from Denmark. She competed at the 1992 Summer Olympics.

== Career ==
She won the bronze medal at the 1991 IBF World Championships in mixed doubles with Jon Holst-Christensen. Grete Kragekjær (previously Mogensen) won the gold medal with Jon Holst-Christensen in mixed doubles at the European Championships in 1990, the same year as they became Danish Champions. In 1993 they won the All England title but lost the final in another World Championships in 1993. Grete won the Danish Championships in Women's doubles both in 1992 and 1993, and in 1991 she became Danish Champion in mixed doubles with Holst-Christensen. She played 47 matches for the Danish national team between 1983 and 1993. Due to her excellent service to the national team, she was awarded Badminton Denmark's badge of merit by Badminton Denmark.

== Achievements ==
=== World Championships ===
Mixed doubles
Year	Venue	Partner	Opponent	Score	Result
1991	Brøndby Arena, Copenhagen, Denmark	(Denmark) Jon Holst-Christensen	(South Korea) Park Joo-bong (South Korea) Chung Myung-hee	15–17, 16–18	Bronze
1993	National Indoor Arena, Birmingham, England	(Denmark) Jon-Holst Christensen	(Denmark) Thomas Lund (Sweden) Catrine Bengtsson	15–10, 6–15, 12–15	Silver

=== European Championships ===
Mixed doubles
Year	Venue	Partner	Opponent	Score	Result
1990	Luzhniki Small Sports Arena, Moscow, Soviet Union	(Denmark) Jon Holst-Christensen	(Sweden) Jan-Eric Antonsson (Sweden) Maria Bengtsson	15–7, 15–8	Gold
1992	Kelvin Hall; Glasgow, Scotland	(Denmark) Jon Holst Christensen	(Denmark) Thomas Lund (Denmark) Pernille Dupont	4–15, 15–9, 12–15	Silver

=== IBF World Grand Prix ===
The World Badminton Grand Prix was sanctioned by the International Badminton Federation (IBF) from 1983 to 2006.

Women's doubles
Year	Tournament	Partner	Opponent	Score	Result
1989	Dutch Open	(Denmark) Pernille Dupont	(England) Gillian Clark (England) Gillian Gowers	15–11, 15–9	(gold) Winner
1990	German Open	(Denmark) Pernille Dupont	(Denmark) Dorte Kjaer (Denmark) Lotte Olsen	9–15, 14–17	(silver) Runner-up

Mixed doubles
Year	Tournament	Partner	Opponent	Score	Result
1987	Scottish Open	(Denmark) Max Gandrup	(Denmark) Thomas Lund (Denmark) Gitte Paulsen	13–15, 15–9, 8–15	(silver) Runner-up
1987	Thailand Open	(Denmark) Peter Buch	(Denmark) Henrik Svarrer (Denmark) Dorte Kjaer	15–9, 15–11	(gold) Winner
1990	Finnish Open	(Denmark) Jon Holst-Christensen	(Denmark) Thomas Lund (Denmark) Pernille Dupont	14–18, 15–13, 10–15	(silver) Runner-up
1990	Swedish Open	(Denmark) Jon Holst-Christensen	(Sweden) Jan-Eric Antonsson (Sweden) Maria Bengtsson	12–15, 15–8, 9–15	(silver) Runner-up
1990	Scottish Open	(Denmark) Jon Holst-Christensen	(Denmark) Jesper Knudsen (Denmark) Nettie Nielsen	15–2, 15–13	(gold) Winner
1990	All England Open	(Denmark) Jon Holst-Christensen	(South Korea) Park Joo-bong (South Korea) Chung Myung-hee	6–15, 3–15	(silver) Runner-up
1990	Dutch Open	(Denmark) Jon Holst-Christensen	(Sweden) Par-Gunnar Jonsson (Sweden) Maria Bengtsson	11–15, 8–15	(silver) Runner-up
1990	World Grand Prix Finals	(Denmark) Jon Holst-Christensen	(Denmark) Thomas Lund (Denmark) Pernille Dupont	15–12, 9–15, 8–15	(silver) Runner-up
1991	Japan Open	(Denmark) Jon Holst-Christensen	(South Korea) Park Joo-bong (South Korea) Chung Myung-hee	7–15, 8–15	(silver) Runner-up
1991	Denmark Open	(Denmark) Jon Holst-Christensen	(Denmark) Thomas Lund (Denmark) Pernille Dupont	7–15, 15–6, 7–15	(silver) Runner-up
1991	Scottish Open	(Denmark) Jon Holst-Christensen	(Denmark) Thomas Lund (Denmark) Pernille Dupont	2–15, 15–9, 18–14	(gold) Winner
1992	Japan Open	(Denmark) Jon Holst-Christensen	(Denmark) Thomas Lund (Denmark) Pernille Dupont	5–15, 11–15	(silver) Runner-up
1992	All England Open	(Denmark) Jon Holst-Christensen	(Denmark) Thomas Lund (Denmark) Pernille Dupont	10–15, 1–15	(silver) Runner-up
1992	World Grand Prix Finals	(Denmark) Jon Holst-Christensen	(Denmark) Thomas Lund (Denmark) Pernille Dupont	5–15, 2–15	(silver) Runner-up
1993	All England Open	(Denmark) Jon Holst-Christensen	(Denmark) Thomas Lund (Sweden) Catrine Bengtsson	8–1 retired	(gold) Winner

=== IBF International ===
Mixed doubles
Year	Tournament	Partner	Opponent	Score	Result
1990	Nordic Championships	(Denmark) Jon Holst-Christensen	(Denmark) Thomas Lund (Denmark) Pernille Dupont	8–15, 12–15	(silver) Runner-up
