= Jens Olsson (badminton) =

Swedish badminton player (born 1964)

Personal information
- Born: Jens Christer Bertil Olsson; 15 December 1964 (age 61) Ödeborg, Sweden
- Height: 1.93 m (6 ft 4 in)
- Weight: 84 kg (185 lb)

Sport
- Country: Sweden
- Sport: Badminton
- Handedness: Right
- Event: Men's singles & doubles

Men's singles & doubles
- BWF profile
Medal record
Men's badminton
Representing Sweden
European Championships
Bronze medal – third place	1994 Den Bosch	Men's singles
European Mixed Team Championships
Gold medal – first place	1994 Den Bosch	Mixed team
Silver medal – second place	1990 Moscow	Mixed team
European Junior Championships
Bronze medal – third place	1983 Helsinki	Mixed team

Jens Christer Bertil Olsson (born 15 December 1964) is a Swedish retired badminton player. He competed at the 1992 Barcelona Summer Olympic Games and 1996 Atlanta Summer Olympic Games in the men's singles event.

== Achievements ==
=== European Championships ===
Men's singles
Year	Venue	Opponent	Score	Result
1994	Maaspoort; Den Bosch, Netherlands	(Denmark) Poul-Erik Høyer Larsen	9–15, 9–15	Bronze

=== IBF World Grand Prix ===
The World Badminton Grand Prix sanctioned by International Badminton Federation (IBF) from 1983 to 2006.

Men's singles
Year	Tournament	Opponent	Score	Result
1988	Swedish Open	(China) Xiong Guobao	9–15, 4–15	(silver) Runner-up
1993	Denmark Open	(Denmark) Poul-Erik Høyer Larsen	11–15, 2–15	(silver) Runner-up
1994	German Open	(Denmark) Poul-Erik Høyer Larsen	3–15, 9–15	(silver) Runner-up
1995	Swiss Open	(Indonesia) Hendrawan	15–9, 15–9	(gold) Winner
