= German National Badminton Championships =

The German National Badminton Championships is a tournament organized to crown the best badminton players in Germany.

The tournament started in 1953 in West Germany, and in 1961 in East Germany.

== Past winners ==
=== West Germany ===
Year	Men's singles	Women's singles	Men's doubles	Women's doubles	Mixed doubles	Team
1953	Hans Walbrück (1. DBC Bonn)	Ingeborg Tietze (Kieler BC 1949)	Hans Riegel / Hans Eschweiler (1. DBC Bonn)	Ingeborg Tietze / Eva Schön (Kieler BC 1949)	Heinz Koch / Hannelore Schmidt (STC Blau-Weiß Solingen)	
1954	Hans Walbrück (1. DBC Bonn)	Hannelore Schmidt (STC Blau-Weiß Solingen)	Hans Walbrück / Günter Ropertz (1. DBC Bonn)	Ingeborg Tietze (Kieler BC) / Luise Stuch-Schmitz (1. DBC Bonn)	Hans Riegel / Luise Stuch-Schmitz (1. DBC Bonn)	
1955	Günter Ropertz (1. DBC Bonn)	Hannelore Schmidt (STC Blau-Weiß Solingen)	Hans Eschweiler / Günter Ropertz (1. DBC Bonn)	Erna Wüsthoff / Irmgard Ehle (Ohligser TV)	Hans Riegel / Luise Stuch-Schmitz (1. DBC Bonn)	
1956	Günter Ropertz (1. DBC Bonn)	Hannelore Schmidt (STC Blau-Weiß Solingen)	Heinz Koch / Kurt Veller (STC Blau-Weiß Solingen)	Gisela Ellermann / Hannelore Schmidt (STC Blau-Weiß Solingen)	Heinz Koch / Hannelore Schmidt (STC Blau-Weiß Solingen)	
1957	Ralf Caspary (1. DBC Bonn)	Hannelore Schmidt (STC Blau-Weiß Solingen)	Hans Eschweiler / Günter Ropertz (1. DBC Bonn)	Gisela Ellermann / Hannelore Schmidt (STC Blau-Weiß Solingen)	Hans Eschweiler (1. DBC Bonn) / Erna Wüsthoff (Ohligser TV)	1. DBC Bonn
1958	Walter Stuch (1. DBC Bonn)	Hannelore Schmidt (STC Blau-Weiß Solingen)	Konrad Hapke / Klaus Dültgen (Merscheider TV)	Gisela Ellermann / Hannelore Schmidt (STC Blau-Weiß Solingen)	Heinz Koch / Hannelore Schmidt (STC Blau-Weiß Solingen)	STC Blau-Weiß Solingen
1959	Peter Knack (BC Biebrich)	Hannelore Schmidt (STC Blau-Weiß Solingen)	Dieter Schramm / Eckart Paatsch (BC Düsseldorf)	Annelie Hennen / Bärbel Riekermann (VfB Lübeck)	Konrad Hapke (Merscheider TV) / Gisela Ellermann (STC Blau-Weiß Solingen)	1. DBC Bonn
1960	Ralf Caspary (1. DBC Bonn)	Hannelore Schmidt (STC Blau-Weiß Solingen)	Dieter Schramm (BC Düsseldorf) / Klaus Dültgen (Merscheider TV)	Ute Melcher (BC Düsseldorf) / Irmgard Latz (Krefelder BC)	Dieter Schramm / Ute Melcher (BC Düsseldorf)	1. DBC Bonn
1961	Jens Wientapper (Hamburger FC 55)	Irmgard Latz (Krefelder BC)	Jürgen Jipp / Manfred Puck (VfB Lübeck)	Annelie Hennen / Bärbel Riekermann (VfB Lübeck)	Dieter Schramm / Ute Melcher (BC Düsseldorf)	1. DBC Bonn
1962	Kurt Jendroska (1. BSC Bottrop)	Irmgard Latz (Krefelder BC)	Klaus Dültgen / Konrad Hapke (Merscheider TV)	Hannelore Schmidt (Blau-Weiß Solingen) / Irmgard Latz (Krefelder BC)	Manfred Puck / Annegret Böhme (VfB Lübeck)	MTV München 1879
1963	Wolfgang Bochow (Blau-Gold Braunschweig)	Irmgard Latz (Krefelder BC)	Peter Birtel / Friedhelm Wulff (VfL Bochum)	Gerda Schumacher (1. DBC Bonn) / Marlies Langenbrink (Kölner FC Blau-Gold)	Günter Ledderhos / Anke Witten (MTV München 1879)	VfB Lübeck
1964	Wolfgang Bochow (Blau-Gold Braunschweig)	Irmgard Latz (Krefelder BC)	Peter Birtel / Friedhelm Wulff (VfL Bochum)	Heidi Reuß / Edeltraud Hefter (TSV Neuhausen-Nymphenburg München)	Helmut Neuz / Ingeborg Abbt-Wanek (TSG Augsburg)	MTV München 1879
1965	Franz Beinvogl (MTV München 1879)	Irmgard Latz (Krefelder BC)	Klaus-Dieter Framke / Manfred Fulle (1. Wiesbadener BC)	Irmgard Latz (Krefelder BC) / Gerda Schumacher (1. DBC Bonn)	Siegfried Betz / Anke Witten (MTV München 1879)	MTV München 1879
1966	Wolfgang Bochow (1. DBC Bonn)	Irmgard Latz (1. DBC Bonn)	Wolfgang Bochow (1. DBC Bonn) / Friedhelm Wulff (VfL Bochum)	Irmgard Latz / Gerda Schumacher (1. DBC Bonn)	Friedhelm Wulff / Margarete Burkhardt (VfL Bochum)	MTV München 1879
1967	Wolfgang Bochow (1. DBC Bonn)	Marieluise Wackerow (1. BC Beuel)	Wolfgang Bochow (1. DBC Bonn) / Friedhelm Wulff (VfL Bochum)	Marieluise Wackerow / Lore Hawig (1. BC Beuel)	Hans Dieter Emmers (Merscheider TV) / Karin Dittberner (1. BV Mülheim)	MTV München 1879
1968	Wolfgang Bochow (1. DBC Bonn)	Irmgard Latz (1. DBC Bonn)	Franz Beinvogl (MTV München 1879) / Willi Braun (VfL Wolfsburg)	Irmgard Latz / Gerda Schumacher (1. DBC Bonn)	Wolfgang Bochow / Irmgard Latz (1. DBC Bonn)	1. BV Mülheim
1969	Siegfried Betz (MTV München 1879)	Marieluise Wackerow (1. BC Beuel)	Gerd Kucki / Horst Lösche (1. BV Mülheim)	Marieluise Wackerow / Gudrun Ziebold (1. BC Beuel)	Roland Maywald (1. BC Beuel) / Karin Dittberner (1. BV Mülheim)	1. BV Mülheim
1970	Wolfgang Bochow (1. DBC Bonn)	Marieluise Wackerow (1. BC Beuel)	Siegfried Betz (MTV München 1879) / Torsten Winter (Grün-Weiß Wiesbaden)	Marieluise Wackerow / Gudrun Ziebold (1. BC Beuel)	Wolfgang Bochow / Irmgard Latz (1. DBC Bonn)	1. BV Mülheim
1971	Gerd Kucki (1. BV Mülheim)	Irmgard Latz (FC Bayer 05 Uerdingen)	Gerd Kucki / Karl-Heinz Garbers (1. BV Mülheim)	Karin Dittberner / Karin Schäfers (1. BV Mülheim)	Gerd Kucki / Karin Dittberner (1. BV Mülheim)	1. BV Mülheim
1972	Wolfgang Bochow (1. DBC Bonn)	Brigitte Steden (VfL Bochum)	Gerd Kucki / Karl-Heinz Garbers (1. BV Mülheim)	Karin Dittberner (1. BV Mülheim) / Marieluise Wackerow (1. BC Beuel)	Wolfgang Bochow (1. DBC Bonn) / Marieluise Wackerow (1. BC Beuel)	1. BV Mülheim
1973	Michael Schnaase (SC Union 08 Lüdinghausen)	Irmgard Latz (FC Bayer 05 Uerdingen)	Gerd Kucki / Karl-Heinz Garbers (1. BV Mülheim)	Brigitte Steden (VfL Bochum) / Marieluise Wackerow (1. BC Beuel)	Horst Lösche (1. BV Mülheim) / Irmgard Latz (FC Bayer 05 Uerdingen)	1. BV Mülheim
1974	Roland Maywald (1. BC Beuel)	Brigitte Steden (VfL Bochum)	Willi Braun (VfL Wolfsburg) / Roland Maywald (1. BC Beuel)	Brigitte Steden (VfL Bochum) / Marieluise Wackerow (1. BC Beuel)	Wolfgang Bochow (1. DBC Bonn) / Marieluise Wackerow (1. BC Beuel)	1. BV Mülheim
1975	Wolfgang Bochow (1. DBC Bonn)	Gudrun Ziebold (Merscheider TV)	Willi Braun (VfL Wolfsburg) / Roland Maywald (1. BC Beuel)	Brigitte Steden (VfL Bochum) / Marieluise Wackerow (1. BC Beuel)	Roland Maywald (1. BC Beuel) / Brigitte Steden (VfL Bochum)	1. BV Mülheim
1976	Michael Schnaase (SC Union 08 Lüdinghausen)	Marieluise Wackerow (1. BC Beuel)	Willi Braun (VfL Wolfsburg) / Roland Maywald (1. BC Beuel)	Eva-Maria Kranz / Marieluise Wackerow (1. BC Beuel)	Wolfgang Bochow (1. DBC Bonn) / Marieluise Wackerow (1. BC Beuel)	1. BV Mülheim
1977	Michael Schnaase (1. BV Mülheim)	Brigitte Steden (OSC Rheinhausen)	Willi Braun (VfL Wolfsburg) / Roland Maywald (1. BC Beuel)	Eva-Maria Kranz (1. BC Beuel) / Brigitte Steden (OSC Rheinhausen)	Roland Maywald (1. BC Beuel) / Brigitte Steden (OSC Rheinhausen)	1. BV Mülheim
1978	Michael Schnaase (1. BV Mülheim)	Eva-Maria Zwiebler (1. BC Beuel)	Roland Maywald / Karl-Heinz Zwiebler (1. BC Beuel)	Karin Dittberner (1. BV Mülheim) / Vera Martini (TuS Wiebelskirchen)	Roland Maywald / Marieluise Wackerow (1. BC Beuel)	1. BV Mülheim
1979	Michael Schnaase (1. BV Mülheim)	Eva-Maria Zwiebler (1. BC Beuel)	Bernd Wessels / Ulrich Rost (STC Blau-Weiß Solingen)	Eva-Maria Kranz (1. BC Beuel) / Vera Martini (TuS Wiebelskirchen)	Michael Schnaase (1. BV Mülheim) / Ingrid Thaler (VfL Wolfsburg)	1. BV Mülheim
1980	Michael Schnaase (1. BV Mülheim)	Marie-Luise Schulta (1. BV Mülheim)	Roland Maywald / Karl-Heinz Zwiebler (1. BC Beuel)	Brigitte Steden (TSV Glinde) / Elke Weber (VfL Wolfsburg)	Roland Maywald / Marieluise Wackerow (1. BC Beuel)	1. BC Beuel
1981	Michael Schnaase (1. BV Mülheim)	Kirsten Schmieder (OSC Rheinhausen)	Roland Maywald / Karl-Heinz Zwiebler (1. BC Beuel)	Brigitte Steden (TSV Glinde) / Elke Weber (VfL Wolfsburg)	Horst Lösche (1. BV Mülheim) / Vera Martini (TuS Wiebelskirchen)	1. BC Beuel
1982	Uwe Scherpen (FC Langenfeld)	Kirsten Schmieder (OSC Rheinhausen)	Thomas Künstler / Stefan Frey (TV Mainz-Zahlbach)	Brigitte Steden (TSV Glinde) / Kirsten Schmieder (OSC Rheinhausen)	Harald Klauer (1. DBC Bonn) / Ingrid Thaler (STC Blau-Weiß Solingen)	1. BC Beuel
1983	Thomas Künstler (TV Mainz-Zahlbach)	Eva-Maria Zwiebler (1. DBC Bonn)	Harald Klauer / Gerhard Treitinger (1. DBC Bonn)	Kirsten Schmieder (OSC Rheinhausen) / Petra Dieris Wierichs (FC Bayer 05 Uerdingen)	Harald Klauer (1. DBC Bonn) / Ingrid Thaler (STC Blau-Weiß Solingen)	1. DBC Bonn
1984	Thomas Künstler (TV Mainz-Zahlbach)	Heidemarie Krickhaus (STC Blau-Weiß Solingen)	Roland Maywald / Karl-Heinz Zwiebler (1. BC Beuel)	Kirsten Schmieder (OSC Rheinhausen) / Petra Dieris Wierichs (FC Bayer 05 Uerdingen)	Stefan Frey / Mechthild Hagemann (TV Mainz-Zahlbach)	OSC Rheinhausen
1985	Thomas Künstler (TV Mainz-Zahlbach)	Kirsten Schmieder (OSC Rheinhausen)	Thomas Künstler / Stefan Frey (TV Mainz-Zahlbach)	Mechthild Hagemann (TV Mainz-Zahlbach) / Cathrin Hoppe (VfL Wolfsburg)	Harald Klauer (1. DBC Bonn) / Kirsten Schmieder (OSC Rheinhausen)	TV Mainz-Zahlbach
1986	Uwe Scherpen (FC Langenfeld)	Kirsten Schmieder (OSC Rheinhausen)	Thomas Künstler / Stefan Frey (TV Mainz-Zahlbach)	Kirsten Schmieder (OSC Rheinhausen) / Katrin Schmidt (1. BC Neustadt)	Stefan Frey / Mechthild Hagemann (TV Mainz-Zahlbach)	TV Mainz-Zahlbach
1987	Guido Schänzler (TTC Brauweiler)	Katrin Schmidt (TuS Wiebelskirchen)	Guido Schänzler (TTC Brauweiler) / Ralf Rausch (FC Bayer 05 Uerdingen)	Kirsten Schmieder / Petra Dieris Wierichs (TTC Brauweiler 1948)	Volker Eiber / Katrin Schmidt (TuS Wiebelskirchen)	TV Mainz-Zahlbach
1988	Guido Schänzler (TTC Brauweiler)	Katrin Schmidt (TuS Wiebelskirchen)	Stephan Kuhl / Uwe Scherpen (FC Langenfeld)	Kirsten Schmieder (TTC Brauweiler) / Katrin Schmidt (TuS Wiebelskirchen)	Ralf Rausch / Christine Skropke (FC Bayer 05 Uerdingen)	1. DBC Bonn
1989	Guido Schänzler (TTC Brauweiler)	Katrin Schmidt (TuS Wiebelskirchen)	Harald Klauer (1. DBC Bonn) / Ralf Rausch (FC Bayer 05 Uerdingen)	Kirsten Schmieder (FC Langenfeld) / Katrin Schmidt (TuS Wiebelskirchen)	Volker Eiber / Katrin Schmidt (TuS Wiebelskirchen)	FC Langenfeld
1990	Volker Renzelmann (TTC Brauweiler)	Katrin Schmidt (TuS Wiebelskirchen)	Stephan Kuhl (FC Langenfeld) / Markus Keck (SV Fortuna Regensburg)	Nicole Baldewein (OSC Düsseldorf) / Kerstin Ubben (FC Langenfeld)	Michael Keck / Anne-Katrin Seid (SV Fortuna Regensburg)	SV Fortuna Regensburg

=== East Germany ===
Year	Men's singles	Men's doubles	Women's singles	Women's doubles	Mixed doubles	Team
1960						Aktivist Tröbitz
1961	Gottfried Seemann (Aktivist Tröbitz)	Gottfried Seemann / Gerolf Seemann (Aktivist Tröbitz)	Rita Gerschner (Traktor Hilbersdorf)	Rita Gerschner / Ruth Preuß (Traktor Hilbersdorf / Post Berlin)	Rita Gerschner / Hans Abraham (Traktor Hilbersdorf / EBT Berlin)	Post Berlin
1962	Gottfried Seemann (Aktivist Tröbitz)	Uwe Trettin / Hartmut Münch (Post Berlin)	Rita Gerschner (Aktivist Tröbitz)	Rita Gerschner / Annemarie Fritzsche (Aktivist Tröbitz)	Rita Gerschner / Erich Wilde (Aktivist Tröbitz)	Aktivist Tröbitz
1963	Gottfried Seemann (Aktivist Tröbitz)	Gottfried Seemann / Erich Wilde (Aktivist Tröbitz)	Rita Gerschner (Aktivist Tröbitz)	Rita Gerschner / Annemarie Fritzsche (Aktivist Tröbitz)	Rita Gerschner / Gottfried Seemann (Aktivist Tröbitz)	Aktivist Tröbitz
1964	Gottfried Seemann (Aktivist Tröbitz)	Gottfried Seemann / Erich Wilde (Aktivist Tröbitz)	Rita Gerschner (Aktivist Tröbitz)	Rita Gerschner / Annemarie Seemann (Aktivist Tröbitz)	Rita Gerschner / Gottfried Seemann (Aktivist Tröbitz)	Aktivist Tröbitz
1965	Gottfried Seemann (Aktivist Tröbitz)	Gottfried Seemann / Erich Wilde (Aktivist Tröbitz)	Rita Gerschner (Aktivist Tröbitz)	Rita Gerschner / Beate Herbst (Aktivist Tröbitz / HSG DHfK Leipzig)	Rita Gerschner / Gottfried Seemann (Aktivist Tröbitz)	Aktivist Tröbitz
1966	Gottfried Seemann (Aktivist Tröbitz)	Gottfried Seemann / Erich Wilde (Aktivist Tröbitz)	Rita Gerschner (Aktivist Tröbitz)	Rita Gerschner / Annemarie Seemann (Aktivist Tröbitz)	Rita Gerschner / Gottfried Seemann (Aktivist Tröbitz)	Aktivist Tröbitz
1967	Gottfried Seemann (Aktivist Tröbitz)	Gottfried Seemann / Erich Wilde (Aktivist Tröbitz)	Ruth Preuß (Einheit Kyritz)	Ruth Preuß / Beate Herbst (Einheit Kyritz / HSG DHfK Leipzig)	Rita Gerschner / Gottfried Seemann (Aktivist Tröbitz)	Aktivist Tröbitz
1968	Joachim Schimpke (Aktivist Tröbitz)	Joachim Schimpke / Klaus Katzor (Aktivist Tröbitz)	Ruth Preuß (Einheit Kyritz)	Ruth Preuß / Beate Herbst (Einheit Kyritz / HSG DHfK Leipzig)	Beate Herbst / Volker Herbst (HSG DHfK Leipzig)	Aktivist Tröbitz
1969	Edgar Michalowski (Einheit Greifswald)	Edgar Michalowski / Erfried Michalowsky (Einheit Greifswald)	Annemarie Richter (BSG Wismut Karl-Marx-Stadt)	Ruth Preuß / Beate Herbst (Einheit Kyritz / HSG DHfK Leipzig)	Karin Kattner / Eberhard Hübner (SG Gittersee)	Aktivist Tröbitz
1970	Klaus Katzor (Aktivist Tröbitz)	Klaus Katzor / Roland Riese (Aktivist Tröbitz)	Monika Thiere (Aktivist Tröbitz)	Monika Thiere / Rita Gerschner (Aktivist Tröbitz)	Rita Gerschner / Joachim Schimpke (Aktivist Tröbitz)	Aktivist Tröbitz
1971	Edgar Michalowski (Einheit Greifswald)	Klaus Katzor / Joachim Schimpke (Aktivist Tröbitz)	Monika Thiere (Aktivist Tröbitz)	Monika Thiere / Rita Gerschner (Aktivist Tröbitz)	Rita Gerschner / Joachim Schimpke (Aktivist Tröbitz)	Aktivist Tröbitz
1972	Edgar Michalowski (Einheit Greifswald)	Edgar Michalowski / Erfried Michalowsky (Einheit Greifswald)	Monika Thiere (Fortschritt Tröbitz)	Christine Zierath / Annemarie Richter (Einheit Greifswald / BSG Wismut Karl-Marx-Stadt)	Monika Thiere / Roland Riese (Fortschritt Tröbitz)	Einheit Greifswald
1973	Edgar Michalowski (Einheit Greifswald)	Edgar Michalowski / Klaus Müller (Einheit Greifswald)	Monika Thiere (Fortschritt Tröbitz)	Monika Thiere / Annemarie Richter (Fortschritt Tröbitz)	Monika Thiere / Roland Riese (Fortschritt Tröbitz)	Einheit Greifswald
1974	Edgar Michalowski (Einheit Greifswald)	Wolfgang Böttcher / Joachim Schimpke (HSG DHfK Leipzig / Fortschritt Tröbitz)	Monika Thiere (SG Gittersee)	Monika Thiere / Jutta Tietze (SG Gittersee)	Monika Thiere / Claus Cassens (SG Gittersee)	Einheit Greifswald
1975	Edgar Michalowski (Einheit Greifswald)	Edgar Michalowski / Erfried Michalowsky (Einheit Greifswald)	Monika Cassens (SG Gittersee)	Angela Michalowski / Christine Zierath (Einheit Greifswald)	Angela Michalowski / Erfried Michalowsky (Einheit Greifswald)	Einheit Greifswald
1976	Edgar Michalowski (Einheit Greifswald)	Edgar Michalowski / Erfried Michalowsky (Einheit Greifswald)	Monika Cassens (SG Gittersee)	Angela Michalowski / Christine Zierath (Einheit Greifswald)	Angela Michalowski / Erfried Michalowsky (Einheit Greifswald)	Einheit Greifswald
1977	Edgar Michalowski (Einheit Greifswald)	Edgar Michalowski / Erfried Michalowsky (Einheit Greifswald)	Monika Cassens (Lok HfV Dresden)	Angela Michalowski / Christine Zierath (Einheit Greifswald)	Angela Michalowski / Erfried Michalowsky (Einheit Greifswald)	Einheit Greifswald
1978	Joachim Schimpke (Fortschritt Tröbitz)	Edgar Michalowski / Erfried Michalowsky (Einheit Greifswald)	Monika Cassens (Lok HfV Dresden)	Monika Cassens / Astrit Schreiber (Lok HfV Dresden / Fortschritt Hohenstein-Ernstthal)	Angela Michalowski / Erfried Michalowsky (Einheit Greifswald)	Einheit Greifswald
1979	Edgar Michalowski (Einheit Greifswald)	Edgar Michalowski / Erfried Michalowsky (Einheit Greifswald)	Monika Cassens (Lok HfV Dresden)	Monika Cassens / Angela Michalowski (Lok HfV Dresden / Einheit Greifswald)	Monika Cassens / Edgar Michalowski (Lok HfV Dresden / Einheit Greifswald)	Einheit Greifswald
1980	Erfried Michalowsky (Einheit Greifswald)	Edgar Michalowski / Erfried Michalowsky (Einheit Greifswald)	Monika Cassens (Lok HfV Dresden)	Monika Cassens / Angela Michalowski (Lok HfV Dresden / Einheit Greifswald)	Monika Cassens / Edgar Michalowski (Lok HfV Dresden / Einheit Greifswald)	Einheit Greifswald
1981	Erfried Michalowsky (Einheit Greifswald)	Edgar Michalowski / Erfried Michalowsky (Einheit Greifswald)	Monika Cassens (Lok HfV Dresden)	Monika Cassens / Ilona Michalowsky (Lok HfV Dresden / Einheit Greifswald)	Monika Cassens / Edgar Michalowski (Lok HfV Dresden / Einheit Greifswald)	Einheit Greifswald
1982	Thomas Mundt (Einheit Greifswald)	Edgar Michalowski / Erfried Michalowsky (Einheit Greifswald)	Monika Cassens (Lok HfV Dresden)	Monika Cassens / Ilona Michalowsky (Lok HfV Dresden / Einheit Greifswald)	Monika Cassens / Edgar Michalowski (Lok HfV Dresden / Einheit Greifswald)	Einheit Greifswald
1983	Erfried Michalowsky (Einheit Greifswald)	Edgar Michalowski / Erfried Michalowsky (Einheit Greifswald)	Monika Cassens (Lok HfV Dresden)	Monika Cassens / Petra Michalowsky (Lok HfV Dresden / Einheit Greifswald)	Petra Michalowsky / Erfried Michalowsky (Einheit Greifswald)	Einheit Greifswald
1984	Edgar Michalowski (Einheit Greifswald)	Frank-Thomas Seyfarth / Jens Scheithauer (Fortschritt Tröbitz)	Petra Michalowsky (Einheit Greifswald)	Monika Cassens / Petra Michalowsky (Lok HfV Dresden / Einheit Greifswald)	Petra Michalowsky / Erfried Michalowsky (Einheit Greifswald)	Einheit Greifswald
1985	Thomas Mundt (Einheit Greifswald)	Edgar Michalowski / Erfried Michalowsky (Einheit Greifswald)	Monika Cassens (Lok HfV Dresden)	Monika Cassens / Petra Michalowsky (Lok HfV Dresden / Einheit Greifswald)	Petra Michalowsky / Erfried Michalowsky (Einheit Greifswald)	Einheit Greifswald
1986	Thomas Mundt (Einheit Greifswald)	Edgar Michalowski / Erfried Michalowsky (Einheit Greifswald)	Birgit Kämmer (Einheit Greifswald)	Angela Michalowski / Birgit Kämmer (Einheit Greifswald)	Petra Michalowsky / Erfried Michalowsky (Einheit Greifswald)	Einheit Greifswald
1987	Thomas Mundt (Einheit Greifswald)	Thomas Mundt / Kai Abraham (Einheit Greifswald / EBT Berlin)	Monika Cassens (Lok HfV Dresden)	Monika Cassens / Petra Michalowsky (Lok HfV Dresden / Einheit Greifswald)	Monika Cassens / Thomas Mundt (Lok HfV Dresden / Einheit Greifswald)	Einheit Greifswald
1988	Thomas Mundt (Einheit Greifswald)	Edgar Michalowski / Erfried Michalowsky (Einheit Greifswald)	Monika Cassens (Lok HfV Dresden)	Monika Cassens / Petra Michalowsky (Lok HfV Dresden / Einheit Greifswald)	Monika Cassens / Thomas Mundt (Lok HfV Dresden / Einheit Greifswald)	Einheit Greifswald
1989	Kai Abraham (EBT Berlin)	Thomas Mundt / André Wiechmann (Einheit Greifswald)	Petra Michalowsky (Einheit Greifswald)	Monika Cassens / Petra Michalowsky (Lok HfV Dresden / Einheit Greifswald)	Petra Michalowsky / Erfried Michalowsky (Einheit Greifswald)	Einheit Greifswald
1990	Thomas Mundt (Einheit Greifswald)	Thomas Mundt / André Wiechmann (Einheit Greifswald)	Petra Michalowsky (Einheit Greifswald)	Monika Cassens / Petra Michalowsky (Lok HfV Dresden / Einheit Greifswald)	Petra Michalowsky / Thomas Mundt (Einheit Greifswald)	Einheit Greifswald

=== Germany ===
Year	Men's singles	Women's singles	Men's doubles	Women's doubles	Mixed doubles	Team
1991	Henner Sudfeld (BC Eintracht Südring)	Katrin Schmidt (TuS Wiebelskirchen)	Volker Eiber; Ralf Rausch (FC Bayer 05 Uerdingen)	Nicole Baldewein (OSC Düsseldorf); Kerstin Ubben (FC Langenfeld)	Michael Keck; Anne-Katrin Seid (SV Fortuna Regensburg)	TuS Wiebelskirchen
1992	Detlef Poste (TTC Brauweiler)	Kerstin Ubben (BC Eintracht Südring Berlin)	Stephan Kuhl (BC Eintracht Südring Berlin); Stefan Frey (TV Mainz-Zahlbach)	Nicole Baldewein (OSC Düsseldorf); Kerstin Ubben (BC Eintracht Südring Berlin)	Uwe Ossenbrink; Katrin Schmidt (TuS Wiebelskirchen)	TuS Wiebelskirchen
1993	Oliver Pongratz (FC Langenfeld)	Andrea Findhammer (FC Langenfeld)	Michael Keck (Fortuna Regensburg); Uwe Ossenbrink (Wiebelskirchen)	Sandra Beißel (TTC Brauweiler); Nicole Grether (SSV Heiligenwald)	Michael Keck (Fortuna Regensburg); Karen Stechmann (FC Langenfeld)	FC Bayer 05 Uerdingen
1994	Oliver Pongratz (FC Langenfeld)	Nicole Baldewein (OSC Düsseldorf)	Uwe Ossenbrink (TuS Wiebelskirchen); Kai Mitteldorf (FC Bayer 05 Uerdingen)	Nicole Baldewein (OSC Düsseldorf); Karen Stechmann (FC Langenfeld)	Michael Keck; Karen Stechmann (FC Langenfeld)	FC Bayer 05 Uerdingen
1995	Oliver Pongratz (FC Langenfeld)	Heike Schönharting (Grün-Weiß Wiesbaden)	Michael Helber (Fortuna Regensburg); Michael Keck (SSV Heiligenwald)	Katrin Schmidt (TuS Wiebelskirchen); Kerstin Ubben (OSC Düsseldorf)	Michael Keck (SSV Heiligenwald); Karen Stechmann (FC Langenfeld)	FC Bayer 05 Uerdingen
1996	Oliver Pongratz (FC Langenfeld)	Heike Schönharting (Grün-Weiß Wiesbaden)	Michael Helber (Fortuna Regensburg); Michael Keck (SSV Heiligenwald)	Katrin Schmidt (TuS Wiebelskirchen); Kerstin Ubben (OSC Düsseldorf)	Michael Keck (SSV Heiligenwald); Karen Stechmann (FC Langenfeld)	SSV Heiligenwald
1997	Oliver Pongratz (FC Langenfeld)	Nicole Grether (SC Bayer 05 Uerdingen)	Michael Helber; Björn Siegemund (SV Fortuna Regensburg)	Katrin Schmidt (TuS Wiebelskirchen); Kerstin Ubben (VfL 93 Hamburg)	Björn Siegemund (Fortuna Regensburg); Katrin Schmidt (TuS Wiebelskirchen)	BC Eintracht Südring Berlin
1998	Oliver Pongratz (FC Langenfeld)	Katja Michalowsky (SSV Heiligenwald)	Michael Helber; Björn Siegemund (SV Fortuna Regensburg)	Karen Stechmann (FC Langenfeld); Kerstin Ubben (VfL 93 Hamburg)	Stephan Kuhl (SC Bayer 05 Uerdingen); Nicol Pitro (Fortuna Regensburg)	SC Bayer 05 Uerdingen
1999	Oliver Pongratz (Berliner SC)	Heike Schönharting (SG 1862 Anspach)	Michael Helber; Björn Siegemund (SV Fortuna Regensburg)	Nicole Grether (SC Bayer 05 Uerdingen); Karen Stechmann (FC Langenfeld)	Björn Siegemund (Fortuna Regensburg); Karen Stechmann (FC Langenfeld)	BC Eintracht Südring Berlin
2000	Björn Joppien (FC Langenfeld)	Katja Michalowsky (TuS Wiebelskirchen)	Christian Mohr (FC Langenfeld); Joachim Tesche (TuS Wiebelskirchen)	Nicol Pitro (SV Fortuna Regensburg); Anika Sietz (Grün-Weiß Wiesbaden)	Christian Mohr (FC Langenfeld); Anne Hönscheid (TTC Brauweiler)	BC Eintracht Südring Berlin
2001	Björn Joppien (FC Langenfeld)	Nicole Grether (SC Bayer 05 Uerdingen)	Thomas Tesche (1. BC Bischmisheim); Kristof Hopp (BC Eintracht Südring Berlin)	Nicole Grether (SC Bayer 05 Uerdingen); Nicol Pitro (VfB Friedrichshafen)	Björn Siegemund (SV Fortuna Regensburg); Nicol Pitro (VfB Friedrichshafen)	BC Eintracht Südring Berlin
2002	Björn Joppien (FC Langenfeld)	Petra Overzier (TTC Brauweiler)	Thomas Tesche (1. BC Bischmisheim); Kristof Hopp (BC Eintracht Südring Berlin)	Nicole Grether (SC Bayer 05 Uerdingen); Nicol Pitro (VfB Friedrichshafen)	Björn Siegemund (SV Fortuna Regensburg); Nicol Pitro (VfB Friedrichshafen)	SC Bayer 05 Uerdingen
2003	Björn Joppien (FC Langenfeld)	Petra Overzier (TTC Brauweiler)	Björn Siegemund; Ingo Kindervater (VfB Friedrichshafen)	Carina Mette (Bottroper BG); Kathrin Piotrowski (FC Langenfeld)	Kristof Hopp (SC Bayer 05 Uerdingen); Kathrin Piotrowski (FC Langenfeld)	SC Bayer 05 Uerdingen
2004	Björn Joppien (FC Langenfeld)	Xu Huaiwen (1. BC Bischmisheim)	Björn Siegemund (VfB Friedrichshafen); Ingo Kindervater (TuS Wiebelskirchen)	Juliane Schenk; Nicole Grether	Björn Siegemund (Fortuna Regensburg); Nicol Pitro (VfB Friedrichshafen)	FC Langenfeld
2005	Marc Zwiebler (1. BC Beuel)	Xu Huaiwen (1. BC Bischmisheim)	Kristof Hopp (1. BC Bischmisheim); Ingo Kindervater (TuS Wiebelskirchen)	Juliane Schenk (SC Union 08 Lüdinghausen); Nicole Grether (EBT Berlin)	Ingo Kindervater (TuS Wiebelskirchen); Kathrin Piotrowski (FC Langenfeld)	1. BC Beuel
2006	Björn Joppien (FC Langenfeld)	Xu Huaiwen (1. BC Bischmisheim)	Kristof Hopp (1. BC Bischmisheim); Ingo Kindervater (1. BC Beuel)	Juliane Schenk; Nicole Grether (SG EBT Berlin)	Ingo Kindervater (1. BC Beuel); Kathrin Piotrowski (1. BC Bischmisheim)	1. BC Bischmisheim
2007	Björn Joppien (FC Langenfeld)	Xu Huaiwen (1. BC Bischmisheim)	Michael Fuchs (1. BC Bischmisheim); Roman Spitko (TuS Wiebelskirchen)	Juliane Schenk; Nicole Grether (SG EBT Berlin)	Tim Dettmann (SG EBT Berlin); Annekatrin Lillie (BW Wittorf)	1. BC Bischmisheim
2008	Marc Zwiebler (1. BC Beuel)	Xu Huaiwen (1. BC Bischmisheim)	Michael Fuchs; Roman Spitko (1. BC Bischmisheim)	Birgit Overzier (1. BC Beuel); Carina Mette (SC Union 08 Lüdinghausen)	Ingo Kindervater (1. BC Beuel); Kathrin Piotrowski (BV Rot-Weiß Wesel)	1. BC Bischmisheim
2009	Marc Zwiebler (1. BC Beuel)	Juliane Schenk (SG EBT Berlin)	Kristof Hopp (1. BC Bischmisheim); Johannes Schöttler (SG EBT Berlin)	Sandra Marinello (1. BC Düren); Birgit Overzier (1. BC Beuel)	Michael Fuchs (1. BC Bischmisheim); Annekatrin Lillie (BW Wittorf)	1. BC Bischmisheim
2010	Marc Zwiebler (1. BC Beuel)	Juliane Schenk (SG EBT Berlin)	Kristof Hopp; Johannes Schöttler (1. BC Bischmisheim)	Sandra Marinello (1. BC Düren); Birgit Overzier (1. BC Beuel)	Ingo Kindervater (1. BC Bischmisheim); Birgit Overzier (1. BC Beuel)	1. BC Bischmisheim
2011	Marc Zwiebler (1. BC Beuel)	Juliane Schenk (SG EBT Berlin)	Ingo Kindervater; Johannes Schöttler (1. BC Bischmisheim)	Sandra Marinello (1. BC Düren); Birgit Michels (1. BC Beuel)	Michael Fuchs (1. BC Bischmisheim); Birgit Michels (1. BC Beuel)	SG EBT Berlin
2012	Marc Zwiebler (1. BC Beuel)	Olga Konon (1. BC Bischmisheim)	Ingo Kindervater (1. BC Beuel); Johannes Schöttler (1. BC Bischmisheim)	Sandra Marinello (1. BC Düren); Birgit Michels (1. BC Beuel)	Michael Fuchs (1. BC Bischmisheim); Birgit Michels (1. BC Beuel)	SG EBT Berlin
2013	Marc Zwiebler (1. BC Beuel)	Fabienne Deprez (FC Langenfeld)	Ingo Kindervater (1. BC Beuel); Johannes Schöttler (1. BC Bischmisheim)	Johanna Goliszewski (1. BV Mülheim); Birgit Michels (1. BC Beuel)	Michael Fuchs (1. BC Bischmisheim); Birgit Michels (1. BC Beuel)	SG EBT Berlin
2014	Lukas Schmidt (1. BC Bischmisheim)	Karin Schnaase (SC Union 08 Lüdinghausen)	Michael Fuchs; Johannes Schöttler (1. BC Bischmisheim)	Johanna Goliszewski (1. BV Mülheim); Birgit Michels (1. BC Beuel)	Michael Fuchs (1. BC Bischmisheim); Birgit Michels (1. BC Beuel)	SC Union 08 Lüdinghausen
2015	Marc Zwiebler (1. BC Bischmisheim)	Olga Konon (1. BC Bischmisheim)	Max Schwenger (TV Refrath); Josche Zurwonne (SC Union 08 Lüdinghausen)	Johanna Goliszewski (1. BV Mülheim); Carla Nelte (TV Refrath)	Michael Fuchs (1. BC Bischmisheim); Birgit Michels (1. BC Beuel)	1. BC Bischmisheim
2016	Marc Zwiebler (1. BC Bischmisheim)	Olga Konon (1. BC Bischmisheim)	Raphael Beck (1. BC Beuel); Peter Käsbauer (1. BC Bischmisheimn)	Johanna Goliszewski (1. BV Mülheim); Carla Nelte (TV Refrath)	Mark Lamsfuß (1. BC Wipperfeld); Isabel Herttrich (1. BC Bischmisheim)	1. BC Bischmisheim
2017	Fabian Roth (TV Refrath)	Luise Heim (1. BC Beuel)	Raphael Beck (1. BC Beuel); Peter Käsbauer (1. BC Bischmisheimn)	Isabel Herttrich (1. BC Bischmisheim); Carla Nelte (TV Refrath)	Raphael Beck (1. BC Beuel); Carla Nelte (TV Refrath)	TV Refrath
2018	Max Weißkirchen (1. BC Beuel)	Luise Heim (1. BC Beuel)	Josche Zurwonne (SC Union 08 Lüdinghausen); Jones Ralfy Jansen (1. BC Wipperfeld)	Isabel Herttrich (1. BC Bischmisheim); Carla Nelte (TV Refrath)	Peter Käsbauer (1. BC Bischmisheim); Olga Konon (1. BC Bischmisheim)	1. BC Bischmisheim
2019	Max Weißkirchen (1. BC Beuel)	Yvonne Li (SC Union 08 Lüdinghausen)	Marvin Seidel (1. BC Bischmisheim); Max Weißkirchen (1. BC Beuel)	Linda Efler (SC Union 08 Lüdinghausen); Isabel Herttrich (1. BC Bischmisheim)	Marvin Seidel (1. BC Bischmisheim); Linda Efler (SC Union 08 Lüdinghausen)	1. BC Bischmisheim
2020	Max Weißkirchen (1. BC Beuel)	Yvonne Li (SC Union 08 Lüdinghausen)	Bjarne Geiss (Blau-Weiss Wittorf); Jan Colin Völker (TV Refrath)	Linda Efler (SC Union 08 Lüdinghausen); Yvonne Li (SC Union 08 Lüdinghausen)	Jones Ralfy Jansen (1. BC Wipperfeld); Kilasu Ostermeyer (TV Refrath)	
2021	Kai Schäfer (SV Fun-Ball Dortelweil)	Yvonne Li (SC Union 08 Lüdinghausen)	Jones Ralfy Jansen (1. BC Wipperfeld); Jan Colin Völker (TV Refrath)	Linda Efler (SC Union 08 Lüdinghausen); Isabel Herttrich (1. BC Bischmisheim)	Mark Lamsfuß (1. BC Wipperfeld); Isabel Herttrich (1. BC Bischmisheim)	1. BC Bischmisheim
2022	Kai Schäfer (SV Fun-Ball Dortelweil)	Yvonne Li (SV Fun-Ball Dortelweil)	Jones Ralfy Jansen (1. BC Wipperfeld); Jan Colin Völker (TV Refrath)	Stine Küspert (1. BC Bischmisheim); Emma Moszczynski (SV Fun-Ball Dortelweil)	Bjarne Geiss (Blau-Weiss Wittorf); Emma Moszczynski (SV Fun-Ball Dortelweil)	1. BC Wipperfeld
2023	Matthias Kicklitz (Blau-Weiss Wittorf)	Yvonne Li (SV Fun-Ball Dortelweil)	Mark Lamsfuß (1. BC Wipperfeld); Marvin Seidel (1. BC Wipperfeld)	Leona Michalski (TV Refrath); Franziska Volkmann (Blau-Weiss Wittorf)	Patrick Scheiel (Blau-Weiss Wittorf); Franziska Volkmann (Blau-Weiss Wittorf)	1. BC Bischmisheim
2024	Matthias Kicklitz (Blau-Weiss Wittorf)	Yvonne Li (SV Fun-Ball Dortelweil)	Bjarne Geiss (Blau-Weiss Wittorf); Jan Colin Völker (TV Refrath)	Julia Meyer (TV Refrath); Leona Michalski (TV Refrath)	Matthias Kicklitz (Blau-Weiss Wittorf); Yvonne Li (SV Fun-Ball Dortelweil)	SV Fun-Ball Dortelweil
2025	Fabian Roth	Brid Stepper	Daniel Hess; Marvin Seidel	Leona Michalski; Thuc Phuong Nguyen	Jan Colin Völker; Franziska Volkmann	SV Fun-Ball Dortelweil
2026	Matthias Kicklitz	Yvonne Li	Jonathan Dresp; Simon Krax	Yvonne Li; Isabel Lohau	Marvin Seidel; Thuc Phuong Nguyen	
