= Hylo Open =

Annual badminton tournament in Germany

- Official website
- Founded: 1988; 38 years ago
- Editions: 39 (2026)
- Location: Saarbrücken (2026); Germany
- Venue: Saarlandhalle (2026)
- Prize money: US$500,000 (2026)

Men's
- Draw: 32S / 32D
- Current champions: Lakshya Sen (singles); Christian Faust Kjær; Rasmus Kjær (doubles)
- Most singles titles: 4 Chou Tien-chen
- Most doubles titles: 3 Michael Keck; Michael Søgaard; Mathias Boe; Carsten Mogensen

Women's
- Draw: 32S / 32D
- Current champions: P. V. Sindhu (singles); Amallia Cahaya Pratiwi; Siti Fadia Silva Ramadhanti (doubles)
- Most singles titles: 5 Huaiwen Xu
- Most doubles titles: 4 Katrin Schmidt

Mixed doubles
- Draw: 32
- Current champions: Thom Gicquel; Delphine Delrue
- Most titles (male): 5 Michael Keck
- Most titles (female): 3 Katrin Schmidt; Karen Stechmann

Super 500
- Arctic Open; Australian Open; Hong Kong Open; Hylo Open; Indonesia Masters; Japan Masters; Korea Open; Malaysia Masters; Thailand Open

Last completed
- 2026 Hylo Open

The Hylo Open, formerly known as the BMW Badminton Cup, BMW Open International, Bitburger Masters, Bitburger Open and SaarLorLux Open, is an international badminton tournament held at the Saarlandhalle in Saarbrücken, Germany, since 1988. It was sponsored by the German automobile company BMW and German pilsner beer brewery Bitburger; since 2021, it is sponsored by Saarbrücken-based eye lubrication company Hylo.

In 2018, this event was selected as part of the BWF Tour Super 100. In 2021, the tournament was upgraded to Super 500 category tournament and was renamed the Hylo Open, before being downgraded to Super 300 the next year. On 31 March 2025, the tournament was elevated back to Super 500 status for the 2025 and 2026 seasons following the Canada Open's demotion to Super 300 level.

== Previous winners ==
Year	Men's singles	Women's singles	Men's doubles	Women's doubles	Mixed doubles
1988	(Denmark) Kim Brodersen	(West Germany) Katrin Schmidt	(West Germany) Markus Keck (West Germany) Robert Neumann	(West Germany) Katrin Schmidt (West Germany) Nicole Baldewein	(West Germany) Markus Keck (West Germany) Katrin Schmidt
1989	(Denmark) Michael Søgaard	(West Germany) Katrin Schmidt	(West Germany) Stefan Frey (West Germany) Robert Neumann	(West Germany) Birgitta Lehnert (Indonesia) Monica Halim	(China) Jin Chen (West Germany) Katrin Schmidt
1990	(Denmark) Jens Peter Nierhoff	(West Germany) Katrin Schmidt	(Denmark) Jens Peter Nierhoff (Denmark) Michael Søgaard	(Germany) Heidi Krickhaus (Germany) Petra Dieris-Wierichs	(China) Jin Chen (West Germany) Katrin Schmidt
1991	(Indonesia) Yoseph Phoa	(Sweden) Margit Borg	(Germany) Michael Helber (Germany) Markus Keck	(Germany) Kerstin Weinbörnert (Germany) Karen Stechmann	(China) Jin Chen (China) Cheng Yan
1992	(Germany) Marek Bujak	(Germany) Nicole Baldewein	(Germany) Michael Keck (Germany) Uwe Ossenbrink	(Germany) Nicole Baldewein (Germany) Anne-Katrin Seid	(Germany) Michael Keck (Germany) Karen Stechmann
1993	(Indonesia) Hargiono	(Denmark) Heidi Dössing	(Indonesia) Yoseph Phoa (Indonesia) Iguh Donolego	(Germany) Katrin Schmidt (Germany) Kerstin Ubben	(Germany) Michael Keck (Germany) Karen Stechmann
1994	(Indonesia) Hargiono	(Russia) Irina Serova	(Indonesia) Dharma Gunawi (China) Li Ang	(Germany) Katrin Schmidt (Germany) Kerstin Ubben	(Germany) Michael Keck (Germany) Karen Stechmann
1995	(Indonesia) Hargiono	(Netherlands) Monique Hoogland	(Germany) Michael Helber (Germany) Michael Keck	(Germany) Katrin Schmidt (Germany) Kerstin Ubben	(Germany) Stephan Kuhl (Germany) Nicol Pitro
1996	(Denmark) Peter Gade	(Denmark) Camilla Martin	(Denmark) Jesper Larsen (Denmark) Jens Eriksen	(Denmark) Rikke Olsen (Denmark) Helene Kirkegaard	(Denmark) Jens Eriksen (Denmark) Marlene Thomsen
1997	(Netherlands) Chris Bruil	(Denmark) Tine Rasmussen	(Denmark) Martin Lundgaard Hansen (Denmark) Janek Roos	(Denmark) Tine Rasmussen (Denmark) Ann-Lou Jørgensen	(Denmark) Janek Roos (Denmark) Ann-Lou Jørgensen
1998	(Germany) Yong Yudianto	(Sweden) Karolina Ericsson	(Germany) Michael Keck (Germany) Christian Mohr	(Netherlands) Erica van den Heuvel (Netherlands) Judith Meulendijks	(Germany) Michael Keck (Germany) Nicol Pitro
1999	(Germany) Oliver Pongratz	(China) Zeng Yaqiong	(Netherlands) Quinten van Dalm (Netherlands) Dennis Lens	(Denmark) Britta Andersen (Denmark) Lene Mørk	(Netherlands) Chris Bruil (Netherlands) Erica van den Heuvel
2000	(China) Xie Yangchun	(China) Xu Huaiwen	(Denmark) Michael Søgaard (Denmark) Joachim Fischer Nielsen	(Germany) Claudia Vogelgsang (China) Xu Huaiwen	(Germany) Michael Keck (Netherlands) Erica van den Heuvel
2001	(Denmark) Niels Christian Kaldau	(China) Pi Hongyan	(Denmark) Michael Søgaard (Denmark) Michael Lamp	(Bulgaria) Neli Boteva (Ukraine) Elena Nozdran	(Netherlands) Chris Bruil (Netherlands) Lotte Bruil-Jonathans
2002	(China) Chen Gang	(France) Pi Hongyan	(England) Simon Archer (Switzerland) Flandy Limpele	(Indonesia) Mia Audina (Netherlands) Lotte Bruil-Jonathans	(England) Nathan Robertson (England) Gail Emms
2003	(Netherlands) Dicky Palyama	(Germany) Xu Huaiwen	(Poland) Michał Łogosz (Poland) Robert Mateusiak	(Germany) Nicole Grether (Germany) Juliane Schenk	(Sweden) Fredrik Bergström (Sweden) Johanna Persson
2004	(Denmark) Niels Christian Kaldau	(Germany) Xu Huaiwen	(England) Simon Archer (England) Anthony Clark	(Poland) Kamila Augustyn (Poland) Nadieżda Kostiuczyk	(Denmark) Rasmus Mangor Andersen (Denmark) Britta Andersen
2005	(Denmark) Kasper Ødum	(Germany) Xu Huaiwen	(United States) Tony Gunawan (United States) Halim Haryanto	(Germany) Nicole Grether (Germany) Juliane Schenk	(Ukraine) Vladislav Druzhchenko (Sweden) Johanna Persson
2006	(Singapore) Ronald Susilo	(Germany) Xu Huaiwen	(Poland) Michał Łogosz (Poland) Robert Mateusiak	(Singapore) Jiang Yanmei (Singapore) Li Yujia	(Poland) Robert Mateusiak (Poland) Nadieżda Kostiuczyk
2007	(China) Lü Yi	(China) Wang Yihan	(Denmark) Mathias Boe (Denmark) Carsten Mogensen	(China) Yang Wei (China) Zhang Jiewen	(Germany) Kristof Hopp (Germany) Birgit Overzier
2008	(India) Chetan Anand	(Indonesia) Maria Febe Kusumastuti	(Denmark) Mathias Boe (Denmark) Carsten Mogensen	(Denmark) Helle Nielsen (Denmark) Marie Røpke	(India) Valiyaveetil Diju (India) Jwala Gutta
2009	(Denmark) Jan Ø. Jørgensen	(Germany) Juliane Schenk	(India) Rupesh Kumar (India) Sanave Thomas	(Denmark) Helle Nielsen (Denmark) Marie Røpke	(Denmark) Mikkel Delbo Larsen (Denmark) Mie Schjøtt-Kristensen
2010	(China) Chen Long	(China) Liu Xin	(Denmark) Mathias Boe (Denmark) Carsten Mogensen	(China) Pan Pan (China) Tian Qing	(China) Zhang Nan (China) Zhao Yunlei
2011	(Denmark) Hans-Kristian Vittinghus	(China) Li Xuerui	(Thailand) Bodin Isara (Thailand) Maneepong Jongjit	(Japan) Mizuki Fujii (Japan) Reika Kakiiwa	(Malaysia) Chan Peng Soon (Malaysia) Goh Liu Ying
2012	(Chinese Taipei) Chou Tien-chen	(Germany) Juliane Schenk	(Germany) Ingo Kindervater (Germany) Johannes Schöttler	(Macau) Wang Rong (Macau) Zhang Zhibo	(Denmark) Anders Kristiansen (Denmark) Julie Houmann
2013	(Chinese Taipei) Chou Tien-chen	(Thailand) Nitchaon Jindapol	(Denmark) Mads Conrad-Petersen (Denmark) Mads Pieler Kolding	(Netherlands) Eefje Muskens (Netherlands) Selena Piek	(Germany) Michael Fuchs (Germany) Birgit Michels
2014	(Chinese Taipei) Chou Tien-chen	(China) Sun Yu	(China) Wang Yilyu (China) Zhang Wen	(China) Ou Dongni (China) Yu Xiaohan	(China) Zheng Siwei (China) Chen Qingchen
2015	(Hong Kong) Ng Ka Long	(Japan) Akane Yamaguchi	(Denmark) Mads Conrad-Petersen (Denmark) Mads Pieler Kolding	(China) Tang Yuanting (China) Yu Yang	(Poland) Robert Mateusiak (Poland) Nadieżda Zięba
2016	(China) Shi Yuqi	(China) He Bingjiao	(Malaysia) Ong Yew Sin (Malaysia) Teo Ee Yi	(China) Chen Qingchen (China) Jia Yifan	(China) Zheng Siwei (China) Chen Qingchen
2017	(Denmark) Rasmus Gemke	(Thailand) Nitchaon Jindapol	(Denmark) Kim Astrup (Denmark) Anders Skaarup Rasmussen	(Thailand) Jongkolphan Kititharakul (Thailand) Rawinda Prajongjai	(China) He Jiting (China) Du Yue
2018	(India) Subhankar Dey	(China) Cai Yanyan	(England) Marcus Ellis (England) Chris Langridge	(Bulgaria) Gabriela Stoeva (Bulgaria) Stefani Stoeva	(England) Marcus Ellis (England) Lauren Smith
2019	(India) Lakshya Sen	(China) Li Yun	(China) Di Zijian (China) Wang Chang	(China) Liu Xuanxuan (China) Xia Yuting	(China) Guo Xinwa (China) Zhang Shuxian
2020	(France) Toma Junior Popov	(Scotland) Kirsty Gilmour	(Denmark) Jeppe Bay (Denmark) Lasse Mølhede	(Bulgaria) Gabriela Stoeva (Bulgaria) Stefani Stoeva	(Denmark) Mathias Christiansen (Denmark) Alexandra Bøje
2021	(Singapore) Loh Kean Yew	(Thailand) Busanan Ongbamrungphan	(Indonesia) Marcus Fernaldi Gideon (Indonesia) Kevin Sanjaya Sukamuljo	(Japan) Chisato Hoshi (Japan) Aoi Matsuda	(Thailand) Dechapol Puavaranukroh (Thailand) Sapsiree Taerattanachai
2022	(Indonesia) Anthony Sinisuka Ginting	(China) Han Yue	(Chinese Taipei) Lu Ching-yao (Chinese Taipei) Yang Po-han	(Thailand) Benyapa Aimsaard (Thailand) Nuntakarn Aimsaard	(Indonesia) Rehan Naufal Kusharjanto (Indonesia) Lisa Ayu Kusumawati
2023	(Chinese Taipei) Chou Tien-chen	(United States) Beiwen Zhang	(China) Liu Yuchen (China) Ou Xuanyi	(China) Zhang Shuxian (China) Zheng Yu	(Hong Kong) Tang Chun Man (Hong Kong) Tse Ying Suet
2024	(France) Christo Popov	(Denmark) Mia Blichfeldt	(England) Ben Lane (England) Sean Vendy	(Chinese Taipei) Sung Shuo-yun (Chinese Taipei) Yu Chien-hui	(Denmark) Jesper Toft (Denmark) Amalie Magelund
2025	(Indonesia) Jonatan Christie	(Denmark) Mia Blichfeldt	(Chinese Taipei) Chiu Hsiang-chieh (Chinese Taipei) Wang Chi-lin	(France) Margot Lambert (France) Camille Pognante	(Denmark) Mathias Christiansen (Denmark) Alexandra Bøje
2026	(India) Lakshya Sen	(India) P. V. Sindhu	(Denmark) Christian Faust Kjær (Denmark) Rasmus Kjær	(Indonesia) Amallia Cahaya Pratiwi (Indonesia) Siti Fadia Silva Ramadhanti	(France) Thom Gicquel (France) Delphine Delrue

== Performances by nation ==
As of the 2026 edition

Pos	Nation	MS	WS	MD	WD	XD	Total
1	Denmark	10	5	13	5	8	41
2	Germany*	3	10	7	10	9.5	39.5
3	China	5	11	3.5	7.5	7	34
4	Indonesia	6	1	2.5	2	1	12.5
5	Netherlands	2	1	1	2.5	2.5	9
6	Chinese Taipei	4		2	1		7
6	India	4	1	1		1	7
6	Thailand		3	1	2	1	7
9	England			3.5		2	5.5
10	France	2	1		1	1	5
10	Poland			2	1	2	5
12	Sweden		2			1.5	3.5
13	Japan		1		2		3
13	Singapore	2			1		3
15	Bulgaria				2.5		2.5
16	Hong Kong	1				1	2
16	Malaysia			1		1	2
16	United States		1	1			2
19	Macau				1		1
19	Russia		1				1
19	Scotland		1				1
19	Ukraine				0.5	0.5	1
23	Switzerland			0.5			0.5
Total		39	39	39	39	39	195

* Host nation
