= Michael Keck =

German badminton player

Personal information
- Born: 8 February 1969 (age 57) Fürth, Bavaria, West Germany
- Height: 1.86 m (6 ft 1 in)
- Weight: 78 kg (172 lb)

Sport
- Country: Germany
- Sport: Badminton
- Handedness: Right
- Event: Men's & mixed doubles

Men's & mixed doubles
- BWF profile
Medal record
Men's badminton
Representing Germany
European Championships
Silver medal – second place	1998 Sofia	Mixed doubles
Bronze medal – third place	1996 Herning	Mixed doubles

Michael Keck (born 8 February 1969) is a German badminton player. Keck clinched nine titles at the National Championships, and won the first time in 1990. He was the bronze medallist at the 1996 European Championships, winning the mixed doubles event at the World Grand Prix tournament in the 1997 Swedish Open. Keck has collected 65 caps for Germany and competed at the 1996 and 2000 Summer Olympics. His brother Markus Keck is also a former German professional badminton player.

== Achievements ==
=== European Championships ===
Mixed doubles
Year	Venue	Partner	Opponent	Score	Result
1996	Herning Badminton Klub; Herning, Denmark	(Germany) Karen Neumann	(Denmark) Michael Søgaard (Denmark) Rikke Olsen	9–15, 10–15	Bronze
1998	Winter Sports Palace; Sofia, Bulgaria	(Netherlands) Erica van den Heuvel	(Denmark) Michael Søgaard (Denmark) Rikke Olsen	7–15, 15–6, 11–15	Silver

=== IBF World Grand Prix ===
The World Badminton Grand Prix sanctioned by International Badminton Federation (IBF) since 1983.

Men's doubles
Year	Tournament	Partner	Opponent	Score	Result
1995	Hamburg Cup	(Germany) Michael Helber	(Germany) Kai Mitteldorf (Germany) Uwe Ossenbrink	15–9, 15–8	(gold) Winner

Mixed doubles
Year	Tournament	Partner	Opponent	Score	Result
1991	Swiss Open	(Germany) Anne-Katrin Seid	(Netherlands) Ron Michels (Germany) Katrin Schmidt	11–15, 15–9, 18–16	(gold) Winner
1994	Scottish Open	(Germany) Karen Neumann	(Sweden) Jan-Eric Antonsson (Sweden) Astrid Crabo	12–15, 12–15	(silver) Runner-up
1995	French Open	(Germany) Karen Neumann	(Denmark) Thomas Stavngaard (Denmark) Anne Søndergaard	9–15, 14–17	(silver) Runner-up
1995	German Open	(Germany) Karen Neumann	(Netherlands) Ron Michels (Netherlands) Erica van den Heuvel	6–15, 15–13, 11–15	(silver) Runner-up
1997	Swedish Open	(Netherlands) Erica van den Heuvel	(Denmark) Jon Holst-Christensen (Germany) Karen Neumann	15–17, 15–12, 15–12	(gold) Winner

=== IBF International ===
Men's doubles
Year	Tournament	Partner	Opponent	Score	Result
1990	Austrian International	(Germany) Kai Mitteldorf	(England) Dave Wright (England) Nick Ponting	3–15, 11–15	(silver) Runner-up
1991	Austrian International	(Germany) Robert Neumann	(Norway) Erik Lia (Norway) Hans Sperre jr.	15–3, 15–8	(gold) Winner
1992	La Chaux-de-Fonds International	(Germany) Robert Neumann	(Germany) Detlef Poste (Germany) Volker Renzelmann	12–15, 5–15	(silver) Runner-up
1992	Austrian International	(Germany) Robert Neumann	(England) Andy Goode (England) Chris Hunt	5–15, 10–15	(silver) Runner-up
1994	La Chaux-de-Fonds International	(Germany) Stephan Kuhl	(Germany) Markus Keck (Germany) Michael Helber	15–12, 15–9	(gold) Winner
1994	New Zealand International	(Germany) Michael Helber	(Germany) Kai Mitteldorf (Germany) Oliver Pongratz	12–15, 15–5, 15–4	(gold) Winner
1995	La Chaux-de-Fonds International	(Germany) Michael Helber	(Russia) Andrey Antropov (Russia) Nikolaj Zuev	11–15, 12–15	(silver) Runner-up
1996	French Open	(Indonesia) Dharma Gunawi	(Denmark) Jesper Larsen (Denmark) Peder Nissen	15–10, 15–8	(gold) Winner
1998	German Masters	(Germany) Christian Mohr	(Germany) Stefan Frey (Germany) Kai Mitteldorf	15–9, 15–4	(gold) Winner
2001	Portugal International	(Germany) Joachim Tesche	(Germany) Thomas Hovgaard (Germany) Jesper Mikla	4–15, 15–12, 15–9	(gold) Winner

Mixed doubles
Year	Tournament	Partner	Opponent	Score	Result
1990	Irish International	(Soviet Union) Irina Serova	(Austria) Kai Abraham (Bulgaria) Diana Koleva	15–10, 15–7	(gold) Winner
1991	French Open	(Germany) Anne-Katrin Seid	(England) Andy Goode (England) Cheryl Johnson	15–12, 15–7	(gold) Winner
1991	Irish International	(Germany) Anne-Katrin Seid	(England) Nick Ponting (England) Joanne Goode	10–15, 11–15	(silver) Runner-up
1992	La Chaux-de-Fonds International	(Germany) Anne-Katrin Seid	(Poland) Jerzy Dołhan (Poland) Bożena Haracz	15–10, 15–9	(gold) Winner
1992	Welsh International	(Germany) Karen Neumann	(England) Nick Ponting (England) Joanne Goode	7–15, 16–18	(silver) Runner-up
1994	La Chaux-de-Fonds International	(Germany) Karen Neumann	(Denmark) Jesper Larsen (Sweden) Ann Sandersson	15–4, 15–5	(gold) Winner
1994	New Zealand International	(Germany) Christine Skropke	(Australia) Peter Blackburn (Australia) Rhonda Cator	8–15, 10–15	(silver) Runner-up
1995	La Chaux-de-Fonds International	(Germany) Karen Neumann	(Germany) Kai Mitteldorf (Germany) Nicol Pitro	15–8, 15–12	(gold) Winner
1995	Victor Cup	(Germany) Katrin Schmidt	(Australia) Peter Blackburn (Australia) Rhonda Cator	15–7, 15–6	(gold) Winner
1997	Austrian International	(Germany) Karen Neumann	(Netherlands) Quinten van Dalm (Netherlands) Nicole van Hooren	15–8, 15–4	(gold) Winner
1997	BMW Open	(Netherlands) Erica van den Heuvel	(Denmark) Janek Roos (Denmark) Ann-Lou Jørgensen	7–15, 7–15	(silver) Runner-up
1998	German Masters	(Netherlands) Erica van den Heuvel	(Germany) Stephan Kuhl (Germany) Nicol Pitro	15–11, 15–14	(gold) Winner
1998	Le Volant d'Or de Toulouse	(Germany) Nicol Pitro	(Ukraine) Vladislav Druzchenko (Ukraine) Victoria Evtushenko	15–12, 15–10	(gold) Winner
1999	La Chaux-de-Fonds International	(Netherlands) Erica van den Heuvel	(Belgium) Ruud Kuijten (Belgium) Manon Albinus	15–5, 15–6	(gold) Winner
1999	Australian International	(Netherlands) Erica van den Heuvel	(England) Chris Hunt (England) Gail Emms	15–9, 15–10	(gold) Winner
1999	Le Volant d'Or de Toulouse	(Germany) Nicol Pitro	(Ukraine) Vladislav Druzchenko (Ukraine) Victoria Evtushenko	15–6, 15–9	(gold) Winner
2000	BMW Open	(Netherlands) Erica van den Heuvel	(Germany) Kristof Hopp (Germany) Kathrin Piotrowski	15–7, 9–15, 15–8	(gold) Winner
