= Badminton at the 2004 Summer Olympics – Mixed doubles =

Mixed doubles at the Games of the XXVIII Olympiad
- Venue: Goudi Olympic Hall
- Date: 14 August to 19 August 2004
- Competitors: 23 from 17 nations

Medalists
| 1st place, gold medalist(s) | | Zhang Jun; Gao Ling | China |
| 2nd place, silver medalist(s) | | Nathan Robertson; Gail Emms | Great Britain |
| 3rd place, bronze medalist(s) | | Jens Eriksen; Mette Schjoldager | Denmark |

These are the results of the mixed doubles competition in badminton at the 2004 Summer Olympics in Athens.

== Seeds ==
1. Kim Dong-moon and Ra Kyung-min (KOR) (quarter-finals)
2. Zhang Jun and Gao Ling (CHN) (gold medalists)
3. Kim Yong-hyun and Lee Hyo-jung (KOR) (second round)
4. Nathan Robertson and Gail Emms (GBR) (silver medalists)
5. Sudket Prapakamol and Saralee Thungthongkam (THA) (second round)
6. Chen Qiqiu and Zhao Tingting (CHN) (quarter-finals)
7. Jonas Rasmussen and Rikke Olsen (DEN) (fourth place)
8. Nova Widianto and Vita Marissa (INA) (quarter-finals)

== Draw ==
=== Top half ===
First round
1 | Kim D-m (KOR); Ra K-m (KOR)
Bye
C Bruil (NED); L Bruil (NED)
Bye
7 | J Rasmussen (DEN); R Olsen (DEN)
Bye
D Shirley (NZL); S Petersen (NZL) | 15 | 15
P Bourret (CAN); D Julien (CAN) | 4 | 6
4 | N Robertson (GBR); G Emms (GBR)
Bye
B Siegemund (GER); N Pitro (GER) | 15 | 8 | 15
T Denney (AUS); K Wilson-Smith (AUS) | 5 | 15 | 4
6 | Chen Q (CHN); Zhao T (CHN)
Bye
N Zuyev (RUS); M Yakusheva (RUS) | 15 | 7 | 5
A Nugroho (INA); E Widiowati (INA) | 12 | 15 | 15

Second round
1 | Kim D-m (KOR); Ra K-m (KOR) | 15 | 15
C Bruil (NED); L Bruil (NED) | 4 | 6
7 | J Rasmussen (DEN); R Olsen (DEN) | 15 | 15
D Shirley (NZL); S Petersen (NZL) | 14 | 9
4 | N Robertson (GBR); G Emms (GBR) | 15 | 15
B Siegemund (GER); N Pitro (GER) | 11 | 4
6 | Chen Q (CHN); Zhao T (CHN) | 15 | 15
A Nugroho (INA); E Widiowati (INA) | 2 | 3

Quarter-finals
1 | Kim D-m (KOR); Ra K-m (KOR) | 14 | 8
7 | J Rasmussen (DEN); R Olsen (DEN) | 17 | 15
4 | N Robertson (GBR); G Emms (GBR) | 15 | 17
6 | Chen Q (CHN); Zhao T (CHN) | 8 | 15

Semi-finals
7 | J Rasmussen (DEN); R Olsen (DEN) | 6 | 12
4 | N Robertson (GBR); G Emms (GBR) | 15 | 15

=== Bottom half ===
First round
T Ohtsuka (JPN); S Yamamoto (JPN) | 15 | 7 | 13
R Blair (GBR); N Munt (GBR) | 13 | 15 | 15
Bye
8 | N Widianto (INA); V Marissa (INA)
S Stoyanov (FRA); V Wright (FRA) | 13 | 15 | 5
J Eriksen (DEN); M Schjoldager (DEN) | 15 | 2 | 15
Bye
3 | Kim Y-h (KOR); Lee H-j (KOR)
F Bergström (SWE); J Persson (SWE) | 15 | 15 | 15
M Beres (CAN); J Patrick (CAN) | 17 | 11 | 4
Bye
5 | S Prapakamol (THA); S Thungthongkam (THA)
Tsai C-h (TPE); Cheng W-h (TPE) | 15 | 15
C Dednam (RSA); A Uys (RSA) | 3 | 9
Bye
2 | Zhang J (CHN); Gao L (CHN)

Second round
R Blair (GBR); N Munt (GBR) | 8 | 12
8 | N Widianto (INA); V Marissa (INA) | 15 | 15
J Eriksen (DEN); M Schjoldager (DEN) | 6 | 15 | 15
3 | Kim Y-h (KOR); Lee H-j (KOR) | 15 | 12 | 13
F Bergström (SWE); J Persson (SWE) | 3 | 17 | 15
5 | S Prapakamol (THA); S Thungthongkam (THA) | 15 | 14 | 3
Tsai C-h (TPE); Cheng W-h (TPE) | 5 | 2
2 | Zhang J (CHN); Gao L (CHN) | 15 | 15

Quarter-finals
8 | N Widianto (INA); V Marissa (INA) | 12 | 8
J Eriksen (DEN); M Schjoldager (DEN) | 15 | 15
F Bergström (SWE); J Persson (SWE) | 3 | 1
2 | Zhang J (CHN); Gao L (CHN) | 15 | 15

Semi-finals
J Eriksen (DEN); M Schjoldager (DEN) | 9 | 5
2 | Zhang J (CHN); Gao L (CHN) | 15 | 15

=== Finals ===
Semi-finals
7 | Jonas Rasmussen (DEN); Rikke Olsen (DEN) | 6 | 12
4 | Nathan Robertson (GBR); Gail Emms (GBR) | 15 | 15
Jens Eriksen (DEN); Mette Schjoldager (DEN) | 9 | 5
2 | Zhang Jun (CHN); Gao Ling (CHN) | 15 | 15

Final
4 | Nathan Robertson (GBR); Gail Emms (GBR) | 1 | 15 | 12
2 | Zhang Jun (CHN); Gao Ling (CHN) | 15 | 12 | 15
Bronze medal match
7 | Jonas Rasmussen (DEN); Rikke Olsen (DEN) | 5 | 5
Jens Eriksen (DEN); Mette Schjoldager (DEN) | 15 | 15

The reigning champions Zhang and Gao held on to their title, but only just. They started the match in scintillating form, steamrollering their way through the first set to take a 1-0 lead.

The second set saw Robertson and Emms change to a more attacking style that saw them put out a lead of 6-1 then 10-6. Zhang was playing nervously and a line judge called one of his shots long to which he made a protest to the umpire, who did not have the authority to overrule the call. In a bizarre change of mind the line judge then corrected his call; Robertson then made his own protest to no avail and the Chinese won back the serve. They pulled back two points to make it 8-10 but after a couple more exchanges of serves the British had set point at 14-10. However they couldn't immediately capitalise on this and Zhang and Gao pulled back to 12-14 but on their next serve the Chinese hit the return long to give Robertson and Emms the set and tie the match at 1-1.

The start of the third set saw the Chinese power their way to an early 3-0 lead and after an exchange of serves the British this time got a close line call in their favour to regain the serve and register a point. Again the service changed hands a couple of times but Robertson and Emms then took a 5-3 lead and on their next set of serves extended this to 7-3 with the Chinese trying every time-wasting trick in the book. The serve changed hands a couple of more times without troubling the scorer until Zhang and Gao made a charge to re-take the lead at 8-6 at which point the teams swapped ends. This change suited the British pair and they pulled level at 8-8 and then pulled ahead at 11-8. Another flurry from the Chinese saw this see-saw game tilt in their favour to reach match point at 14-11 but a nervously played gold medal point saw Robertson keep the British in the match. They added one more point before losing their serve and giving the Chinese the chance to serve for the gold again. Emms saved the first point with a terrific backhand but on their second service the Chinese won the point to deny the British and take the set and the match 15-12.

This was the first time since the event's debut at the 1992 Summer Olympics that a non-Asian team had made it to the final.
