= Karen Neumann =

German badminton player

Personal information
- Born: Karen Stechmann; 15 September 1971 (age 55) Stade, Lower Saxony, West Germany
- Height: 1.69 m (5 ft 7 in)
- Weight: 59 kg (130 lb)

Sport
- Country: Germany
- Sport: Badminton
- Handedness: Right
- Event: Women's & mixed doubles

Women's & mixed doubles
- BWF profile
Medal record
Women's badminton
Representing Germany
European Championships
Bronze medal – third place	1996 Herning	Mixed doubles
European Junior Championships
Bronze medal – third place	1989 Manchester	Girls' doubles

Karen Neumann (born 15 September 1971; née Stechmann) is a German badminton player. She competed at the 1996 and 2000 Summer Olympics. In the national event, Neumann who played for the FC Langenfeld had won eight titles at the National Championships. Neumann was the bronze medallists at the 1996 European Championships in the mixed doubles event, and at the 1989 European Junior Championships in the girls' doubles event.

== Achievements ==
=== European Championships ===
Mixed doubles
Year	Venue	Partner	Opponent	Score	Result
1996	Herning Badminton Klub; Herning, Denmark	(Germany) Michael Keck	(Denmark) Michael Søgaard (Denmark) Rikke Olsen	9–15, 10–15	Bronze

=== European Junior Championships ===
Girls' doubles
Year	Venue	Partner	Opponent	Score	Result
1989	Armitage Centre; Manchester, England	(Germany) Kerstin Weinbörner	(Denmark) Helene Kirkegaard (Denmark) Camilla Martin	8–15, 5–15	Bronze

=== IBF World Grand Prix ===
The World Badminton Grand Prix sanctioned by International Badminton Federation (IBF) since 1983.

Mixed doubles
Year	Tournament	Partner	Opponent	Score	Result
1994	Scottish Open	(Germany) Michael Keck	(Sweden) Jan-Eric Antonsson (Sweden) Astrid Crabo	12–15, 12–15	(silver) Runner-up
1995	French Open	(Germany) Michael Keck	(Denmark) Thomas Stavngaard (Denmark) Anne Søndergaard	9–15, 14–17	(silver) Runner-up
1995	German Open	(Germany) Michael Keck	(Netherlands) Ron Michels (Netherlands) Erica van den Heuvel	6–15, 15–13, 11–15	(silver) Runner-up
1997	Swedish Open	(Denmark) Jon Holst-Christensen	(Germany) Michael Keck (Netherlands) Erica van den Heuvel	17–15, 12–15, 12–15	(silver) Runner-up

=== IBF International ===
Women's doubles
Year	Tournament	Partner	Opponent	Score	Result
1994	La Chaux-de-Fonds International	(Germany) Nicole Baldewein	(Sweden) Lotta Andersson (Sweden) Margit Borg	12–15, 3–15	(silver) Runner-up
1995	La Chaux-de-Fonds International	(Germany) Heidi Døssing-Eiber	(Sweden) Maria Bengtsson (Sweden) Margit Borg	15–8, 12–15, 2–15	(silver) Runner-up
1995	Victor Cup	(Germany) Kerstin Ubben	(Germany) Sandra Beißel (Germany) Katrin Schmidt	8–15, 15–12, 11–15	(silver) Runner-up
1996	New Zealand International	(Germany) Nicol Pitro	(New Zealand) Tammy Jenkins (New Zealand) Rhona Robertson	8–15, 9–15	(silver) Runner-up
1997	Austrian International	(Germany) Nicol Pitro	(England) Gail Emms (England) Joanne Wright	15–3, 10–15, 15–8	(gold) Winner
1998	German Masters	(Germany) Kerstin Ubben	(Germany) Nicol Pitro (Germany) Anika Sietz	18–16, 15–9	(gold) Winner
1999	Portugal International	(Germany) Nicole Grether	(England) Sara Sankey (England) Ella Miles	12–15, 12–15	(silver) Runner-up
1999	BMW Open	(Germany) Katja Michalowsky	(Denmark) Britta Andersen (Denmark) Lene Mørk	10–15, 9–15	(silver) Runner-up

Mixed doubles
Year	Tournament	Partner	Opponent	Score	Result
1992	Welsh International	(Germany) Michael Keck	(England) Nick Ponting (England) Joanne Goode	7–15, 16–18	(silver) Runner-up
1994	La Chaux-de-Fonds International	(Germany) Michael Keck	(Denmark) Jesper Larsen (Sweden) Ann Sandersson	15–4, 15–5	(gold) Winner
1995	La Chaux-de-Fonds International	(Germany) Michael Keck	(Germany) Kai Mitteldorf (Germany) Nicol Pitro	15–8, 15–12	(gold) Winner
1996	La Chaux-de-Fonds International	(Germany) Björn Siegemund	(England) James Anderson (England) Emma Constable	15–11, 15–5	(gold) Winner
1997	Austrian International	(Germany) Michael Keck	(Netherlands) Quinten van Dalm (Netherlands) Nicole van Hooren	15–8, 15–4	(gold) Winner
1999	Portugal International	(Germany) Björn Siegemund	(England) Ian Sullivan (England) Gail Emms	15–11, 12–15, 15–8	(gold) Winner
1999	BMW Open	(Germany) Björn Siegemund	(Netherlands) Chris Bruil (Netherlands) Erica van den Heuvel	15–2, 3–15, 10–15	(silver) Runner-up
2000	Croatian International	(Germany) Björn Siegemund	(Canada) Mike Beres (Canada) Kara Solmundson	1–15, 11–15	(silver) Runner-up
