= Swiss Open (badminton) =

Annual badminton tournament held in Switzerland

- Official website
- Founded: 1955; 71 years ago
- Editions: 63 (2026)
- Location: Basel (2026); Switzerland
- Venue: St. Jakobshalle (2026)
- Prize money: USD250,000 (2026)

Men's
- Draw: 32S / 32D
- Current champions: Yushi Tanaka (singles); Lee Fang-chih; Lee Fang-jen (doubles)
- Most singles titles: 3 Chen Jin; Lin Dan
- Most doubles titles: 3 Chai Biao; Hong Wei; Koo Kien Keat; Pär-Gunnar Jönsson

Women's
- Draw: 32S / 32D
- Current champions: Supanida Katethong (singles); Li Yijing; Wang Yiduo (doubles)
- Most singles titles: 6 Liselotte Blumer
- Most doubles titles: 4 June Jacques

Mixed doubles
- Draw: 32
- Current champions: Cheng Xing; Zhang Chi
- Most titles (male): 3 Kim Dong-moon
- Most titles (female): 3 Ra Kyung-min

Super 300
- Canada Open; German Open; Korea Masters; Macau Open; New Zealand Open; Orléans Masters; Spain Masters; Swiss Open; Syed Modi International; Taipei Open; Thailand Masters; U.S. Open

Last completed
- 2026 Swiss Open

The Swiss Open (French: Open de Suisse), is an annual badminton tournament held in Switzerland since 1955 and become one of the BWF Super Series tournament began 2007. In 2011 the tournament was dropped down to a Grand Prix Gold event. As of 2023, it is a BWF World Tour Super 300 event.

== Previous winners ==
Year	Men's singles	Women's singles	Men's doubles	Women's doubles	Mixed doubles
1955	(Malaysia) David E. L. Choong	(France) E. Müller	(Malaysia) David E. L. Choong (Malaysia) L. T. Lee	No competition	
1956	(Malaysia) David E. L. Choong	No competition	(Malaysia) David E. L. Choong (Malaysia) L. T. Lee	No competition	
1957	(West Germany) Günter Ropertz	(West Germany) Hannelore Schmidt	(West Germany) Günter Ropertz (West Germany) Hans Eschweiler	(West Germany) Hannelore Schmidt (West Germany) Gisela Ellermann	(West Germany) Kurt Veller (West Germany) Gisela Ellermann
1958	(West Germany) Günter Ropertz	(England) Julie Charles	(United States) Tom Heden (United States) Nish Jamgotch	No competition	(Netherlands) Bob Loo (France) Noëlle Ailloud
1959	(Denmark) Bengt Albertsen	(Thailand) Pratuang Pattabongse	(Denmark) Bengt Albertsen (Denmark) Arne Rasmussen	No competition	(Denmark) Arne Rasmussen (West Germany) Hannelore Schmidt
1960	(Denmark) Erland Kops	(Denmark) Annette Schmidt	(Denmark) Erland Kops (Denmark) Knud E. Jepsen	(West Germany) Ute Seelbach (West Germany) Irmgard Latz	(Denmark) Erland Kops (Denmark) Annette Schmidt
1961	(Denmark) Ole Mertz	(Denmark) Tonny Holst-Christensen	(Denmark) Ole Mertz (Denmark) Bjørn Holst-Christensen	No competition	(Denmark) Bjørn Holst-Christensen (Denmark) Tonny Holst-Christensen
1962– 1963	No competition				
1964	(Denmark) Tage Nielsen	(Belgium) June Vander Willigen	(Denmark) Tage Nielsen (Switzerland) Heinz Honegger	(Belgium) Bep Verstoep (Belgium) June Vander Willigen	(Belgium) Herman Moens (Belgium) Bep Verstoep
1965	(Denmark) Tage Nielsen	(Belgium) Bep Verstoep	(Denmark) Tage Nielsen (Switzerland) Heinz Honegger	(Belgium) Bep Verstoep (Belgium) June Jacques	(Switzerland) Bernard Carrel (Switzerland) Josée Bel
1966– 1968	No competition				
1969	(Switzerland) Hubert Riedo	(West Germany) Brigitte Potthoff	(Austria) Kurt Achtleitner (Austria) Karl Buchart	(West Germany) Brigitte Potthoff (Belgium) June Jacques	(Belgium) Roger Vanmeerbeek (Belgium) June Jacques
1970	(Mexico) Roy Díaz González	(Austria) Ingrid Wieltschnig	(Austria) Herman Fröhlich (Mexico) Roy Díaz González	(Austria) Ingrid Wieltschnig (Belgium) June Jacques	(Austria) Herman Fröhlich (Austria) Ingrid Wieltschnig
1971	(West Germany) Torsten Winter	(Switzerland) Josée Carrel	(West Germany) Torsten Winter (West Germany) Hugo Wilmes	(Austria) Hedwig Hurst (Austria) Vreni Schkölzinger	(West Germany) Hugo Wilmes (Switzerland) L. Ruchet
1972– 1973	No competition				
1974	(Mexico) Roy Díaz González	(South Africa) Barbara Lord	(Mexico) Ricardo Jaramillo (Mexico) Jorge Palazuelos	(South Africa) Barbara Lord (South Africa) Deirdre Tyghe	(Mexico) Roy Díaz González (South Africa) Deirdre Tyghe
1975	(Denmark) Bjarne Caspersen	(Switzerland) Liselotte Blumer	(South Africa) William Kerr (South Africa) Kenneth Parsons	(Netherlands) Tonny Pannemans (South Africa) Ann Parsons	(South Africa) Kenneth Parsons (South Africa) Ann Parsons
1976	(Denmark) Steen Fladberg	(Taiwan) Yu Yuk-geor	(Denmark) Claus Andersen (Denmark) Hans Olaf Birkholm	(Taiwan) Yu Yuk-geor (Taiwan) Lim Shour	(Denmark) Hans Olaf Birkholm (Denmark) Birthe Ratsach
1977	(Denmark) Gert Helsholt	(Switzerland) Liselotte Blumer	(Denmark) Peter Holm (Denmark) Hans Olaf Birkholm	(Netherlands) Hanke de Kort (Netherlands) Inge Rozemeijer	(Denmark) Peter Holm (Denmark) Birthe Ratsach
1978	No competition				
1979	(Taiwan) Liao Kun-fu	(Switzerland) Liselotte Blumer	(West Germany) Gerd Kattau (West Germany) Olaf Rosenow	(Denmark) Pia Nielsen (Denmark) Jette Boyer	(Denmark) Peter Holm (Denmark) Pia Nielsen
1980	(West Germany) Bernd Wessels	(Switzerland) Liselotte Blumer	(West Germany) Bernd Wessels (West Germany) Gunther Bludau	(Denmark) Lone Nielsen (Denmark) Lisbeth Lauridsen	(Denmark) Per Nygaard (Denmark) Bente Terkelsen
1981	(Netherlands) Rob Ridder	(Switzerland) Liselotte Blumer	(Denmark) Kenn H. Nielsen (Denmark) Jens Peter Nierhoff	(Denmark) Susanne Ejlertsen (Denmark) Liselotte Gøttsche	(Netherlands) Rob Ridder (Netherlands) Marjan Ridder
1982	(Czechoslovakia) Michal Malý	(Netherlands) Eline Coene	(Netherlands) Bas von Barnau Sijthoff (Netherlands) Ed Romeijn	(Netherlands) Paula Kloet (Netherlands) Grace Kakiay	(Netherlands) Guus van der Vlugt (Netherlands) Paula Kloet
1983	(Thailand) Sompol Kukasemkij	(Netherlands) Eline Coene	(Netherlands) Frank van Dongen (Netherlands) Ivan Kristanto	(Netherlands) Eline Coene (Netherlands) Jeanette van Driel	(Netherlands) Bas von Barnau Sijthoff (Netherlands) Jeanette van Driel
1984	(West Germany) Uwe Scherpen	(Switzerland) Liselotte Blumer	(West Germany) Rolf Rüsseler (West Germany) Volker Eiber	(Netherlands) Monique Hoogland (Netherlands) Erica van Dijck	(West Germany) Hans-Georg Fischedick (West Germany) Susanne Altmann
1985	(Soviet Union) Vitaliy Shmakov	(Soviet Union) Tatyana Litvinenko	(West Germany) Rolf Rüsseler (West Germany) Volker Eiber	(Soviet Union) Tatyana Litvinenko (Soviet Union) Elena Rybkina	(Soviet Union) Vitaliy Shmakov (Soviet Union) Elena Rybkina
1986	(United States) Chris Jogis	(Netherlands) Monique Hoogland	(Netherlands) Ron Michels (Netherlands) Hendrik Rozemeijer	(Netherlands) Monique Hoogland (Netherlands) Paula Kloet	(Netherlands) Alex Meijer (Netherlands) Paula Kloet
1987	(Wales) Philip Sutton	(Netherlands) Astrid van der Knaap	(Scotland) Billy Gilliland (England) Andy Goode	(West Germany) Katrin Schmidt (West Germany) Heidemarie Krickhaus	(Netherlands) Alex Meijer (Netherlands) Monique Hoogland
1988	(Malaysia) Kwan Yoke Meng	(West Germany) Christine Skropke	(Malaysia) Ong Beng Teong (Malaysia) Cheah Soon Kit	(Netherlands) Paula Rip-Kloet (Netherlands) Maaike de Boer	(West Germany) Ralf Rausch (West Germany) Christine Skropke
1989	(China) Liu Zhiheng	(China) Tang Jiuhong	(Malaysia) Ong Beng Teong (Malaysia) Cheah Soon Kit	(China) Huang Hua (China) Tang Jiuhong	(South Korea) Kim Moon-soo (South Korea) Chung So-young
1990	(West Germany) Michael Keck	(Bulgaria) Diana Koleva	(West Germany) Stefan Frey (West Germany) Stephan Kuhl	(East Germany) Monika Cassens (East Germany) Petra Michalowsky	(West Germany) Bernd Schwitzgebel (East Germany) Petra Michalowsky
1991	(Sweden) Pär-Gunnar Jönsson	(Russia) Elena Rybkina	(Sweden) Pär-Gunnar Jönsson (Sweden) Stellan Österberg	(Germany) Katrin Schmitt (Germany) Kerstin Ubben	(Germany) Michael Keck (Germany) Anne-Katrin Seid
1992	(Indonesia) Joko Suprianto	(Netherlands) Astrid van der Knaap	(Sweden) Jan-Eric Antonsson (Sweden) Stellan Osterberg	(Sweden) Maria Bengtsson (Sweden) Catrine Bengtsson	(Sweden) Mikael Rosén (Sweden) Maria Bengtsson
1993	(Indonesia) Fung Permadi	(Indonesia) Yuliani Santosa	(Sweden) Pär-Gunnar Jönsson (Sweden) Peter Axelsson	(England) Gillian Clark (England) Joanne Wright	(Sweden) Pär-Gunnar Jönsson (Sweden) Maria Bengtsson
1994	(Denmark) Thomas Stuer-Lauridsen	(Denmark) Camilla Martin	(Sweden) Pär-Gunnar Jönsson (Sweden) Peter Axelsson	(Denmark) Lotte Olsen (Denmark) Lisbet Stuer-Lauridsen	(Sweden) Peter Axelsson (Denmark) Marlene Thomsen
1995	(Sweden) Jens Olsson	(Denmark) Camilla Martin	(Denmark) Jon Holst-Christensen (Denmark) Thomas Lund	(Denmark) Helene Kirkegaard (Denmark) Rikke Olsen	(Denmark) Thomas Lund (Denmark) Marlene Thomsen
1996	(Denmark) Poul-Erik Høyer Larsen	(Denmark) Camilla Martin	(Denmark) Jon Holst-Christensen (Denmark) Thomas Lund	(Denmark) Lisbet Stuer-Lauridsen (Denmark) Marlene Thomsen	(Sweden) Jan-Eric Antonsson (Sweden) Astrid Crabo
1997	(China) Dong Jiong	(Denmark) Camilla Martin	(South Korea) Lee Dong-soo (South Korea) Yoo Yong-sung	(China) Ge Fei (China) Gu Jun	(China) Liu Yong (China) Ge Fei
1998	(Denmark) Peter Gade	(Denmark) Camilla Martin	(China) Zhang Wei (China) Zhang Jun	(China) Ge Fei (China) Gu Jun	(Denmark) Michael Søgaard (Denmark) Rikke Olsen
1999	(Chinese Taipei) Fung Permadi	(Indonesia) Cindana Hartono Kusuma	(Denmark) Jens Eriksen (Denmark) Jesper Larsen	(Denmark) Mette Sørensen (Denmark) Rikke Olsen	(England) Simon Archer (England) Joanne Goode
2000	(China) Xia Xuanze	(China) Dai Yun	(South Korea) Ha Tae-kwon (South Korea) Kim Dong-moon	(China) Qin Yiyuan (China) Gao Ling	(South Korea) Kim Dong-moon (South Korea) Ra Kyung-min
2001	(Malaysia) Roslin Hashim	(France) Pi Hongyan	(Denmark) Michael Søgaard (Denmark) Jim Laugesen	(South Korea) Ra Kyung-min (South Korea) Lee Kyung-won	(Denmark) Jens Eriksen (Denmark) Mette Schjoldager
2002	(Indonesia) Marleve Mainaky	(Netherlands) Mia Audina	(South Korea) Lee Dong-soo (South Korea) Yoo Yong-sung	(South Korea) Ra Kyung-min (South Korea) Lee Kyung-won	(South Korea) Kim Dong-moon (South Korea) Ra Kyung-min
2003	(South Korea) Lee Hyun-il	(China) Zhang Ning	(England) Flandy Limpele (England) Eng Hian	(China) Yang Wei (China) Zhang Jiewen	(Denmark) Jens Eriksen (Denmark) Mette Schjoldager
2004	(China) Lin Dan	(China) Gong Ruina	(China) Fu Haifeng (China) Cai Yun	(China) Gao Ling (China) Huang Sui	(South Korea) Kim Dong-moon (South Korea) Ra Kyung-min
2005	(Malaysia) Muhammad Hafiz Hashim	(France) Pi Hongyan	(Indonesia) Candra Wijaya (Indonesia) Sigit Budiarto	(South Korea) Lee Kyung-won (South Korea) Lee Hyo-jung	(England) Nathan Robertson (England) Gail Emms
2006	(Malaysia) Lee Chong Wei	(Germany) Huaiwen Xu	(Malaysia) Chan Chong Ming (Malaysia) Koo Kien Keat	(China) Du Jing (China) Yu Yang	(England) Nathan Robertson (England) Gail Emms
2007	(China) Chen Jin	(China) Zhang Ning	(Malaysia) Koo Kien Keat (Malaysia) Tan Boon Heong	(China) Zhao Tingting (China) Yang Wei	(South Korea) Lee Yong-dae (South Korea) Lee Hyo-jung
2008	(China) Lin Dan	(China) Xie Xingfang	(South Korea) Jung Jae-sung (South Korea) Lee Yong-dae	(China) Yang Wei (China) Zhang Jiewen	(China) He Hanbin (China) Yu Yang
2009	(Malaysia) Lee Chong Wei	(China) Wang Yihan	(Malaysia) Koo Kien Keat (Malaysia) Tan Boon Heong	(China) Du Jing (China) Yu Yang	(China) Zheng Bo (China) Ma Jin
2010	(China) Chen Jin	(China) Wang Shixian	(South Korea) Ko Sung-hyun (South Korea) Yoo Yeon-seong	(China) Tian Qing (China) Yu Yang	(South Korea) Lee Yong-dae (South Korea) Lee Hyo-jung
2011	(South Korea) Park Sung-hwan	(India) Saina Nehwal	(South Korea) Ko Sung-hyun (South Korea) Yoo Yeon-seong	(South Korea) Ha Jung-eun (South Korea) Kim Min-jung	(Denmark) Joachim Fischer Nielsen (Denmark) Christinna Pedersen
2012	(China) Chen Jin	(India) Saina Nehwal	(Japan) Naoki Kawamae (Japan) Shōji Satō	(China) Xia Huan (China) Tang Jinhua	(Indonesia) Tontowi Ahmad (Indonesia) Liliyana Natsir
2013	(China) Wang Zhengming	(China) Wang Shixian	(China) Chai Biao (China) Hong Wei	(South Korea) Jung Kyung-eun (South Korea) Kim Ha-na	(Denmark) Joachim Fischer Nielsen (Denmark) Christinna Pedersen
2014	(Denmark) Viktor Axelsen	(China) Wang Yihan	(China) Chai Biao (China) Hong Wei	(China) Bao Yixin (China) Tang Jinhua	(England) Chris Adcock (England) Gabby Adcock
2015	(India) Srikanth Kidambi	(China) Sun Yu	(China) Cai Yun (China) Lu Kai	(China) Bao Yixin (China) Tang Yuanting	(China) Lu Kai (China) Huang Yaqiong
2016	(India) Prannoy H. S.	(China) He Bingjiao	(Denmark) Kim Astrup (Denmark) Anders Skaarup Rasmussen	(Japan) Shizuka Matsuo (Japan) Mami Naito	(China) Wang Yilyu (China) Chen Qingchen
2017	(China) Lin Dan	(China) Chen Xiaoxin	(China) Chai Biao (China) Hong Wei	(China) Chen Qingchen (China) Jia Yifan	(Thailand) Dechapol Puavaranukroh (Thailand) Sapsiree Taerattanachai
2018	(India) Sameer Verma	(Japan) Sayaka Takahashi	(Denmark) Mathias Boe (Denmark) Carsten Mogensen	(Japan) Ayako Sakuramoto (Japan) Yukiko Takahata	(Germany) Mark Lamsfuß (Germany) Isabel Lohau
2019	(China) Shi Yuqi	(China) Chen Yufei	(Indonesia) Fajar Alfian (Indonesia) Muhammad Rian Ardianto	(South Korea) Chang Ye-na (South Korea) Jung Kyung-eun	(Denmark) Mathias Bay-Smidt (Denmark) Rikke Søby Hansen
2020	Cancelled (Note: This tournament, originally to be played from 17 to 22 March, was later cancelled due to COVID-19 pandemic in Switzerland.)				
2021	(Denmark) Viktor Axelsen	(Spain) Carolina Marín	(Denmark) Kim Astrup (Denmark) Anders Skaarup Rasmussen	(Malaysia) Pearly Tan (Malaysia) Thinaah Muralitharan	(France) Thom Gicquel (France) Delphine Delrue
2022	(Indonesia) Jonatan Christie	(India) P. V. Sindhu	(Indonesia) Fajar Alfian (Indonesia) Muhammad Rian Ardianto	(Bulgaria) Gabriela Stoeva (Bulgaria) Stefani Stoeva	(Germany) Mark Lamsfuß (Germany) Isabel Lohau
2023	(Japan) Koki Watanabe	(Thailand) Pornpawee Chochuwong	(India) Satwiksairaj Rankireddy (India) Chirag Shetty	(Japan) Rena Miyaura (Japan) Ayako Sakuramoto	(China) Jiang Zhenbang (China) Wei Yaxin
2024	(Chinese Taipei) Lin Chun-yi	(Spain) Carolina Marín	(England) Ben Lane (England) Sean Vendy	(Indonesia) Lanny Tria Mayasari (Indonesia) Ribka Sugiarto	(Malaysia) Goh Soon Huat (Malaysia) Shevon Jemie Lai
2025	(China) Weng Hongyang	(China) Chen Yufei	(Thailand) Kittinupong Kedren (Thailand) Dechapol Puavaranukroh	(China) Jia Yifan (China) Zhang Shuxian	(China) Feng Yanzhe (China) Wei Yaxin
2026	(Japan) Yushi Tanaka	(Thailand) Supanida Katethong	(Chinese Taipei) Lee Fang-chih (Chinese Taipei) Lee Fang-jen	(China) Li Yijing (China) Wang Yiduo	(China) Cheng Xing (China) Zhang Chi

== Performance by nations ==
As of the 2026 edition

Pos	Nation	MS	WS	MD	WD	XD	Total
1	China	12	15	6	17	8	58
2	Denmark	13	7	14	7	14	55
3	West Germany	6	3	7	3.5	4.5	24
4	Netherlands	1	6	3.5	6.5	5.5	22.5
5	South Korea	2		6	6	6	20
6	Malaysia	7		7	1	1	16
7	Switzerland	1	7	1	1	1.5	11.5
8	Indonesia	4	2	3	1	1	11
9	Sweden	2		4	1	3.5	10.5
10	England		1	2.5	1	4	8.5
11	Belgium		2		3	2	7
11	India	3	3	1			7
11	Japan	2	1	1	3		7
14	Chinese Taipei	3	1	1	1		6
14	Thailand	1	3	1		1	6
16	Germany		1		1	3	5
16	South Africa		1	1	1.5	1.5	5
18	France		3			1.5	4.5
19	Austria		1	1.5	0.5	1	4
19	Mexico	2		1.5		0.5	4
19	Soviet Union	1	1		1	1	4
22	Bulgaria		1		1		2
22	Spain		2				2
24	East Germany				1	0.5	1.5
24	United States	1		0.5			1.5
26	Czechoslovakia	1					1
26	Russia		1				1
26	Wales	1					1
29	Scotland			0.5			0.5
Total		63	62	63	58	61	307
