= Michael Helber =

German badminton player

Personal information
- Born: 4 October 1970 (age 55) Bochum, North Rhine-Westphalia, West Germany
- Height: 1.85 m (6 ft 1 in)
- Weight: 72 kg (159 lb)

Sport
- Country: Germany
- Sport: Badminton
- Handedness: Right
- Event: Men's & mixed doubles

Men's & mixed doubles
- BWF profile
Medal record
Men's badminton
Representing West Germany
European Junior Championships
Bronze medal – third place	1989 Manchester	Mixed doubles

Michael Helber (born 4 October 1970) is a German badminton player. He competed at the Summer Olympics in 1996 and 2000. Helber was the bronze medalist at the 1989 European Junior Championships in the mixed doubles event partnered with Kerstin Weinborner. Played for the Fortuna Regensburg, he had won five consecutive men's doubles title at the German National Championships partnered with Michael Keck in 1995 and 1996; and with Björn Siegemund in 1997, 1998 and 1999.

== Achievements ==
=== European Junior Championships ===
Mixed doubles

Year	Venue	Partner	Opponent	Score	Result
1989	Armitage Centre, Manchester, England	(West Germany) Kerstin Weinbörner	(Denmark) Christian Jakobsen (Denmark) Marlene Thomsen	5–15, 7–15	Bronze

=== IBF International ===
Men's doubles

Year	Tournament	Partner	Opponent	Score	Result
1997	La Chaux-de-Fonds International	(Germany) Björn Siegemund	(England) Anthony Clark (England) Ian Sullivan	15–12, 18–17	(gold) Winner
1995	Hamburg Cup	(Germany) Michael Keck	(Germany) Kai Mitteldorf (Germany) Uwe Ossenbrink	15–9, 15–8	(gold) Winner
1995	Victor Cup	(Germany) Kai Mitteldorf	(Indonesia) Dharma Gunawi (Brunei) Imay Hendra	5–15, 8–15	(silver) Runner-up
1995	La Chaux-de-Fonds International	(Germany) Michael Keck	(Russia) Andrey Antropov (Russia) Nikolaj Zuev	11–15, 12–15	(silver) Runner-up
1994	New Zealand International	(Germany) Michael Keck	(Germany) Kai Mitteldorf (Germany) Oliver Pongratz	12–15, 15–5, 15–4	(gold) Winner
1994	Victor Cup	(Germany) Markus Keck	(Chinese Taipei) Liao Wei-chieh (Chinese Taipei) Lin Shyau-hsin	13–18, 15–9, 11–15	(silver) Runner-up
1994	La Chaux-de-Fonds International	(Germany) Markus Keck	(Germany) Michael Keck (Germany) Stephan Kuhl	12–15, 9–15	(silver) Runner-up
1991	Bulgarian International	(Germany) Markus Keck	(Poland) Jerzy Dołhan (Poland) Jacek Hankiewicz	15–10, 15–5	(gold) Winner
1991	Czechoslovakian International	(Germany) Markus Keck	(Germany) Detlef Poste (Germany) Volker Renzelmann	15–5, 15–5	(gold) Winner

Mixed doubles

Year	Tournament	Partner	Opponent	Score	Result
1991	Czechoslovakian International	(Germany) Anne-Katrin Seid	(Soviet Union) Vladislav Druzchenko (Soviet Union) Marina Yakusheva	9–15, 15–13, 4–15	(silver) Runner-up
