= Stadion am Löschenhofweg =

Football stadium in Uerdingen, Krefeld, Germany

Coordinates: 51.3612°N 6.6337°E

Stadion am Löschenhofweg, also known as Stadion im Covestro Sportpark and Bayer Sportstadion, is a football stadium with an athletics facility in the Uerdingen district of Krefeld, North Rhine-Westphalia, Germany. Located within the Covestro sports park, it is owned and used by the Sportclub Krefeld 05 multi-sport club.

Adjacent to the stadium, and also within the sports park, is the Bayer Uerdingen Cricket Ground, part of Germany's national cricket performance centre, a joint venture between SC Bayer 05 Uerdingen and the German Cricket Federation.
