= Nathan Robertson =

English badminton player (born 1977)

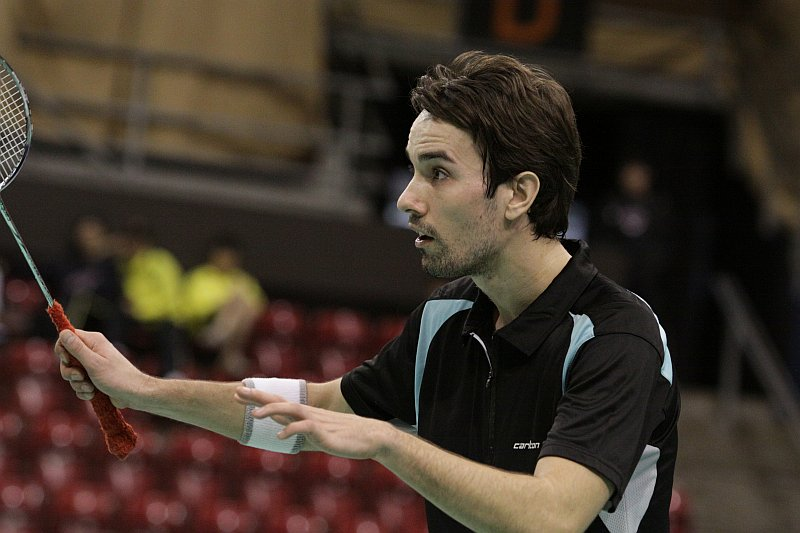

Personal information
- Born: Nathan James Robertson; 30 May 1977 (age 49) Nottingham, England
- Height: 1.88 m (6 ft 2 in)
- Weight: 82 kg (181 lb; 12.9 st)

Sport
- Country: England
- Sport: Badminton
- Handedness: Right
- Coached by: Andy Wood; Julian Robertson

Men's & mixed doubles
- Highest ranking: 1 (XD with Gail Emms); 4 (MD)
- BWF profile
Medal record
Men's badminton
Representing Great Britain
Olympic Games
Silver medal – second place	2004 Athens	Mixed doubles
Representing England
World Championships
Gold medal – first place	2006 Madrid	Mixed doubles
Bronze medal – third place	1999 Copenhagen	Men's doubles
Sudirman Cup
Bronze medal – third place	2007 Glasgow	Mixed team
Commonwealth Games
Gold medal – first place	2002 Manchester	Mixed team
Gold medal – first place	2006 Melbourne	Mixed doubles
Silver medal – second place	1998 Kuala Lumpur	Mixed doubles
Silver medal – second place	2006 Melbourne	Mixed team
Silver medal – second place	2010 Delhi	Men's doubles
Silver medal – second place	2010 Delhi	Mixed doubles
Bronze medal – third place	1998 Kuala Lumpur	Men's doubles
Bronze medal – third place	1998 Kuala Lumpur	Men's team
Bronze medal – third place	2002 Manchester	Men's doubles
Bronze medal – third place	2010 Delhi	Mixed team
European Championships
Gold medal – first place	2004 Geneva	Mixed doubles
Silver medal – second place	2002 Malmö	Men's doubles
Silver medal – second place	2002 Malmö	Mixed doubles
Silver medal – second place	2004 Geneva	Men's doubles
Bronze medal – third place	1998 Sofia	Men's doubles
Bronze medal – third place	2000 Glasgow	Men's doubles
Bronze medal – third place	2008 Herning	Mixed doubles
Bronze medal – third place	2010 Manchester	Mixed doubles
European Mixed Team Championships
Silver medal – second place	1998 Sofia	Mixed team
Silver medal – second place	2000 Glasgow	Mixed team
Silver medal – second place	2002 Malmö	Mixed team
Silver medal – second place	2008 Herning	Mixed team
Silver medal – second place	2009 Liverpool	Mixed team
Bronze medal – third place	2006 Den Bosch	Mixed team
Bronze medal – third place	2011 Amsterdam	Mixed team
European Men's Team Championships
Silver medal – second place	2008 Almere	Men's team
Bronze medal – third place	2006 Thessalonica	Men's team
Bronze medal – third place	2012 Amsterdam	Men's team
World Junior Championships
Bronze medal – third place	1994 Kuala Lumpur	Mixed doubles

Nathan James Robertson (born 30 May 1977) from Cotgrave in Nottinghamshire is a retired English badminton player who has achieved international success in both the men's events and the mixed doubles event. He was educated at Dayncourt School Specialist Sports College.

== Career ==
=== 2004 ===
Robertson best results include winning gold at the 2004 European Championships in Geneva, and a silver medal at the 2004 Olympic Games, both partnering Gail Emms in the mixed doubles. He has won six medals at the Commonwealth Games, and has won the last four men's doubles (with Anthony Clark) and the last two mixed doubles (with Gail Emms) at the English National Championships.

==== 2004 Summer Olympics ====
Robertson competed in badminton at the 2004 Summer Olympics in men's doubles with partner Anthony Clark. They defeated Patapol Ngernsrisuk and Sudket Prapakamol of Thailand in the first round, then were defeated in the round of 16 by Eng Hian and Flandy Limpele of Indonesia, who had previously represented England for a brief period.

He also competed in mixed doubles with Emms. They had a bye in the first round and defeated Björn Siegemund and Nicol Pitro of Germany in the second. In the quarterfinals, Robertson and Emms beat Chen Qiqiu and Zhao Tingting of China 15–8, 17–15 to advance to the semifinals. There, they beat Jonas Rasmussen and Rikke Olsen of Denmark 15–6, 15–12. In the final, they lost to Chinese pair Zhang Jun and Gao Ling 1–15, 15–12, 12–15 to finish with the silver medal.

=== 2005 World Championships ===
At the 2005 World Championships, Robertson and Emms began the tournament as number 1 seeds. However, after getting a bye into the second round, he received an ankle injury during practice and they were forced to withdraw.

=== 2006 ===
The 2006 Commonwealth Games brought Robertson a silver in the team event and a gold in the mixed doubles with Emms.

The same year, he won the gold medal at the 2006 World Championships together with Emms. They beat Anthony Clark and Donna Kellogg 21–15, 21–12 in the final.

=== 2008 Beijing Games ===
Robertson and Emms did well in their first match in the mixed doubles with a win over the Chinese pairing who were world number 2. The 2006 world champions took the first game 21–16 before Gao Ling and Zheng Bo hit back to win the second 21–16. The British duo found themselves 12–17 down in the decider only to show great powers of recovery to triumph 21–19. Along with his partner, Gail Emms, they lost out on a medal at the quarter final stage.

=== 2009 World Championships ===
Robertson was part of the English team forced to withdraw from the 2009 World Championships held in Hyderabad, India because of a terrorist threat.

== Racket ==
Nathan Robertson used the Carlton Fireblade Tour racket.

== Retirement ==
Nathan Robertson announced his retirement on 5 June 2012.

== Achievements ==
=== Olympic Games ===
Mixed doubles
Year	Venue	Partner	Opponent	Score	Result
2004	Goudi Olympic Hall, Athens, Greece	(United Kingdom) Gail Emms	(China) Zhang Jun (China) Gao Ling	1–15, 15–12, 12–15	Silver

=== World Championships ===
Men's doubles
Year	Venue	Partner	Opponent	Score	Result
1999	Brøndby Arena, Copenhagen, Denmark	(England) Simon Archer	(South Korea) Lee Dong-soo (South Korea) Yoo Yong-sung	11–15, 8–15	Bronze

Mixed doubles
Year	Venue	Partner	Opponent	Score	Result
2006	Palacio de Deportes de la Comunidad, Madrid, Spain	(England) Gail Emms	(England) Anthony Clark (England) Donna Kellogg	21–15, 21–12	Gold

=== Commonwealth Games ===
Men's doubles
Year	Venue	Partner	Opponent	Score	Result
1998	Kuala Lumpur Badminton Stadium, Kuala Lumpur, Malaysia	(England) Julian Robertson	(Malaysia) Cheah Soon Kit (Malaysia) Yap Kim Hock	2–15, 15–12, 8–15	Bronze
2002	Bolton Arena, Manchester, England	(England) Anthony Clark	(Malaysia) Chang Kim Wai (Malaysia) Choong Tan Fook	5–8, 3–7, 4–7	Bronze
2010	Siri Fort Sports Complex, New Delhi, India	(England) Anthony Clark	(Malaysia) Koo Kien Keat (Malaysia) Tan Boon Heong	19–21, 14–21	Silver

Mixed doubles
Year	Venue	Partner	Opponent	Score	Result
1998	Kuala Lumpur Badminton Stadium, Kuala Lumpur, Malaysia	(England) Joanne Davies	(England) Simon Archer (England) Joanne Goode	2–15, 5–15	Silver
2006	Melbourne Convention and Exhibition Centre, Melbourne, Australia	(England) Gail Emms	(New Zealand) Daniel Shirley (New Zealand) Sara Petersen	21–17, 21–10	Gold
2010	Siri Fort Sports Complex, New Delhi, India	(England) Jenny Wallwork	(Malaysia) Koo Kien Keat (Malaysia) Chin Eei Hui	20–22, 12–21	Silver

=== European Championships ===
Men's doubles
Year	Venue	Partner	Opponent	Score	Result
1998	Winter Sports Palace, Sofia, Bulgaria	(England) Julian Robertson	(Sweden) Peter Axelsson (Sweden) Pär-Gunnar Jönsson	15–10, 10–15, 10–15	Bronze
2000	Kelvin Hall International Sports Arena, Glasgow, Scotland	(England) Simon Archer	(Denmark) Jens Eriksen (Denmark) Jesper Larsen	13–15, 15–7, 3–15	Bronze
2002	Baltiska Hallen, Malmö, Sweden	(England) Anthony Clark	(Denmark) Jens Eriksen (Denmark) Martin Lundgaard Hansen	4–7, 7–1, 3–7, 7–2, 3–7	Silver
2004	Queue d’Arve Sport Center, Geneva, Switzerland	(England) Anthony Clark	(Denmark) Jens Eriksen (Denmark) Martin Lundgaard Hansen	3–15, 9–15	Silver

Mixed doubles
Year	Venue	Partner	Opponent	Score	Result
2002	Baltiska Hallen, Malmö, Sweden	(England) Gail Emms	(Denmark) Jens Eriksen (Denmark) Mette Schjoldager	5–7, 3–7, 1–7	Silver
2004	Queue d’Arve Sport Center, Geneva, Switzerland	(England) Gail Emms	(Denmark) Jonas Rasmussen (Denmark) Rikke Olsen	15–3, 8–15, 15–5	Gold
2008	Messecenter, Herning, Denmark	(England) Gail Emms	(Poland) Robert Mateusiak (Poland) Nadieżda Kostiuczyk	21–14, 10–21, 6–21	Bronze
2010	Manchester Evening News Arena, Manchester, England	(England) Jenny Wallwork	(Poland) Robert Mateusiak (Poland) Nadieżda Kostiuczyk	18–21, 21–18, 9–21	Bronze

=== World Junior Championships ===
Mixed doubles
Year	Venue	Partner	Opponent	Score	Result
1994	Kuala Lumpur Badminton Stadium, Kuala Lumpur, Malaysia	(England) Gail Emms	(China) Zhang Wei (China) Qiang Hong	14–17, 5–15	Bronze

=== BWF Superseries ===
The BWF Superseries, which was launched on 14 December 2006 and implemented in 2007, is a series of elite badminton tournaments, sanctioned by the Badminton World Federation (BWF). BWF Superseries levels are Superseries and Superseries Premier. A season of Superseries consists of twelve tournaments around the world that have been introduced since 2011. Successful players are invited to the Superseries Finals, which are held at the end of each year.

Men's doubles
Year	Tournament	Partner	Opponent	Score	Result
2009	Singapore Open	(England) Anthony Clark	(Indonesia) Markis Kido (Indonesia) Hendra Setiawan	21–12, 21–11	(gold) Winner

Mixed doubles
Year	Tournament	Partner	Opponent	Score	Result
2007	Malaysia Open	(England) Gail Emms	(China) Zheng Bo (China) Gao Ling	12–21, 21–14, 15–21	(silver) Runner-up
2007	Denmark Open	(England) Gail Emms	(China) He Hanbin (China) Yu Yang	17–21, 21–19, 17–21	(silver) Runner-up
2010	Denmark Open	(England) Jenny Wallwork	(Denmark) Thomas Laybourn (Denmark) Kamilla Rytter Juhl	12–21, 21–12, 9–21	(silver) Runner-up

BWF Super Series Finals tournament
BWF Super Series Premier tournament
BWF Super Series tournament

=== BWF Grand Prix ===
The BWF Grand Prix had two levels, the BWF Grand Prix and Grand Prix Gold. It was a series of badminton tournaments sanctioned by the Badminton World Federation (BWF) which was held from 2007 to 2017. The World Badminton Grand Prix has been sanctioned by the International Badminton Federation from 1983 to 2006.

Men's doubles
Year	Tournament	Partner	Opponent	Score	Result
1998	Polish Open	(England) Julian Robertson	(England) Ian Pearson (England) Nick Ponting	2–15, 15–8, 15–3	(gold) Winner
2004	Thailand Open	(England) Anthony Clark	(Indonesia) Luluk Hadiyanto (Indonesia) Alvent Yulianto	12–15, 6–15	(silver) Runner-up

Mixed doubles
Year	Tournament	Partner	Opponent	Score	Result
2001	Dutch Open	(England) Gail Emms	(Netherlands) Chris Bruil (Netherlands) Lotte Jonathans	7–5, 3–7, 7–3, 7–4	(gold) Winner
2001	Denmark Open	(England) Gail Emms	(Indonesia) Tri Kusharjanto (Indonesia) Emma Ermawati	5–7, 1–7, 4–7	(silver) Runner-up
2002	Malaysia Open	(England) Gail Emms	(China) Wang Wei (China) Zhang Yawen	11–9, 11–4	(gold) Winner
2002	Singapore Open	(England) Gail Emms	(South Korea) Kim Dong-moon (South Korea) Ra Kyung-min	2–11, 10–13	(silver) Runner-up
2003	Thailand Open	(England) Gail Emms	(China) Chen Qiqiu (China) Zhao Tingting	4–11, 11–8, 0–11	(silver) Runner-up
2003	Malaysia Open	(England) Gail Emms	(South Korea) Kim Dong-moon (South Korea) Ra Kyung-min	6–15, 5–15	(silver) Runner-up
2004	Thailand Open	(England) Gail Emms	(Thailand) Sudket Prapakamol (Thailand) Saralee Thungthongkam	8–15, 15–12, 15–11	(gold) Winner
2004	Denmark Open	(England) Gail Emms	(China) Chen Qiqiu (China) Zhao Tingting	4–15, 11–15	(silver) Runner-up
2005	German Open	(England) Gail Emms	(South Korea) Lee Jae-jin (South Korea) Lee Hyo-jung	12–15, 14–17	(silver) Runner-up
2005	All England Open	(England) Gail Emms	(Denmark) Thomas Laybourn (Denmark) Kamilla Rytter Juhl	15–10, 15–12	(gold) Winner
2005	Swiss Open	(England) Gail Emms	(Indonesia) Nova Widianto (Indonesia) Liliyana Natsir	17–14, 15–6	(gold) Winner
2005	Hong Kong Open	(England) Gail Emms	(China) Xie Zhongbo (China) Zhang Yawen	8–15, 5–15	(silver) Runner-up
2005	China Open	(England) Gail Emms	(South Korea) Lee Jae-jin (South Korea) Lee Hyo-jung	15–10, 15–10	(gold) Winner
2006	Swiss Open	(England) Gail Emms	(England) Robert Blair (England) Natalie Munt	14–17, 15–7, 15–2	(gold) Winner
2006	All England Open	(England) Gail Emms	(China) Zhang Jun (China) Gao Ling	15–12, 14–17, 1–15	(silver) Runner-up
2006	Singapore Open	(England) Gail Emms	(Indonesia) Nova Widianto (Indonesia) Liliyana Natsir	16–21, 22–20, 21–23	(silver) Runner-up
2011	Swiss Open	(England) Jenny Wallwork	(Denmark) Joachim Fischer Nielsen (Denmark) Christinna Pedersen	21–23, 14–21	(silver) Runner-up

BWF Grand Prix Gold tournament
BWF Grand Prix tournament

=== BWF International Challenge/Series ===
Men's doubles
Year	Tournament	Partner	Opponent	Score	Result
1995	Hungarian International	(England) Julian Robertson	(Austria) Harald Koch (Austria) Jürgen Koch	15–18, 15–7, 15–13	(gold) Winner
1995	Welsh International	(England) Julian Robertson	(Russia) Andrey Antropov (Russia) Nikolai Zuyev	8–15, 8–15	(silver) Runner-up
1996	Portugal International	(England) Steve Isaac	(England) James Anderson (England) Ian Pearson	11–15, 5–15	(silver) Runner-up
1996	La Chaux-de-Fonds International	(England) Steve Isaac	(England) James Anderson (England) Ian Pearson	12–15, 15–13, 15–17	(silver) Runner-up
1996	Norwegian International	(England) Julian Robertson	(Sweden) Henrik Andersson (Sweden) Johan Tholinsson	9–2, 9–8, 9–3	(gold) Winner
1997	Norwegian International	(England) Julian Robertson	(Sweden) Henrik Andersson (Sweden) Jens Olsson	4–9, 9–4, 9–2, 0–9, 9–4	(gold) Winner
2002	BMW Open International	(England) Anthony Clark	(England) Simon Archer (England) Flandy Limpele	5–15, 14–17	(silver) Runner-up

Mixed doubles
Year	Tournament	Partner	Opponent	Score	Result
1995	Hungarian International	(England) Gail Emms	(Austria) Jürgen Koch (Austria) Irina Serova	6–15, 8–15	(silver) Runner-up
1995	Irish International	(England) Gail Emms	(England) Julian Robertson (England) Lorraine Cole	4–15, 4–15	(silver) Runner-up
1996	Portugal International	(England) Gail Emms	(England) James Anderson (England) Emma Constable	12–15, 15–13, 18–13	(gold) Winner
1997	La Chaux-de-Fonds International	(England) Sara Hardaker	(Ukraine) Vladislav Druzchenko (Russia) Marina Yakusheva	9–15, 15–3, 10–15	(silver) Runner-up
1997	Irish International	(England) Joanne Wright	(Sweden) Henrik Andersson (Sweden) Jenny Karlsson	14–18, 15–11, 17–14	(gold) Winner
2002	BMW Open International	(England) Gail Emms	(Denmark) Mathias Boe (Denmark) Rikke Olsen	11–9, 3–11, 11–9	(gold) Winner
2012	Swedish International	(England) Jenny Wallwork	(Denmark) Mads Pieler Kolding (Denmark) Julie Houmann	21–17, 21–17	(gold) Winner
2012	Polish International	(England) Jenny Wallwork	(England) Ben Stawski (England) Lauren Smith	21–15, 21–11	(gold) Winner
2013	Canadian International	(England) Jenny Wallwork	(Canada) Toby Ng (Canada) Alex Bruce	21–9, 21–12	(gold) Winner

BWF International Challenge tournament
BWF International Series tournament
