= Gail Emms =

English badminton player (born 1977)

Gail Emms MBE
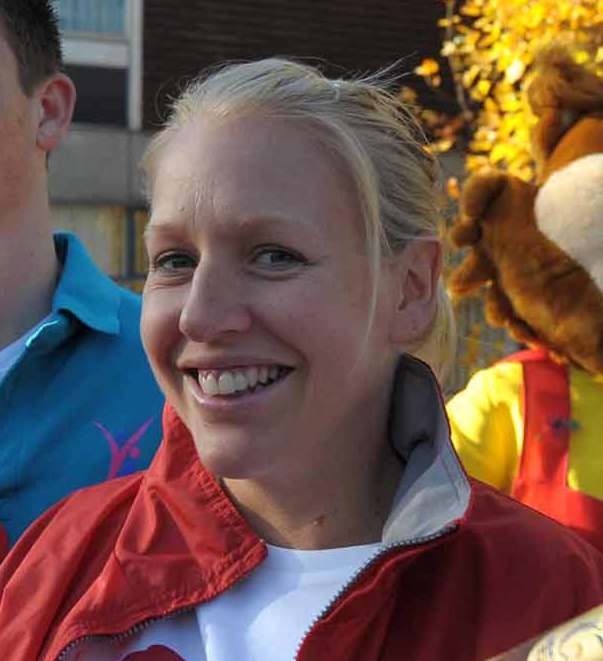
- Emms in 2009

Personal information
- Born: Gail Elizabeth Emms; 23 July 1977 (age 49) Hitchin, Hertfordshire, England
- Height: 1.63 m (5 ft 4 in)

Sport
- Country: England
- Sport: Badminton
- Handedness: Right
- Coached by: Andy Wood; Julian Robertson

Women's & mixed doubles
- Highest ranking: 1 (XD with Nathan Robertson)
- BWF profile
Medal record
Women's badminton
Representing Great Britain
Olympic Games
Silver medal – second place	2004 Athens	Mixed doubles
Representing England
World Championships
Gold medal – first place	2006 Madrid	Mixed doubles
Sudirman Cup
Bronze medal – third place	2007 Glasgow	Mixed team
Commonwealth Games
Gold medal – first place	2002 Manchester	Mixed team
Gold medal – first place	2006 Melbourne	Mixed doubles
Silver medal – second place	2006 Melbourne	Mixed team
Bronze medal – third place	2002 Manchester	Women's doubles
Bronze medal – third place	2006 Melbourne	Women's doubles
European Championships
Gold medal – first place	2004 Geneva	Mixed doubles
Gold medal – first place	2006 Den Bosch	Women's doubles
Silver medal – second place	2002 Malmö	Mixed doubles
Silver medal – second place	2008 Herning	Women's doubles
Bronze medal – third place	2008 Herning	Mixed doubles
European Mixed Team Championships
Silver medal – second place	2000 Glasgow	Mixed team
Silver medal – second place	2002 Malmö	Mixed team
Silver medal – second place	2008 Herning	Mixed team
Bronze medal – third place	2006 Den Bosch	Mixed team
European Women's Team Championships
Silver medal – second place	2006 Thessalonica	Women's team
World Junior Championships
Bronze medal – third place	1994 Kuala Lumpur	Mixed doubles
European Junior Championships
Bronze medal – third place	1995 Nitra	Girls' doubles
Bronze medal – third place	1995 Nitra	Mixed team

Gail Elizabeth Emms MBE (born 23 July 1977) is a retired English badminton player who has achieved international success in doubles tournaments. A badminton player since the age of four, Emms was first chosen to represent England in 1995 and regularly played for her country until her retirement from professional sport in 2008.

Her best results were winning gold at the 2006 World Championships in Madrid, 2004 European Championships in Geneva, and a silver medal at the 2004 Olympic Games, partnering Nathan Robertson in the mixed doubles. At the 2002 Commonwealth Games in Manchester she won a bronze medal with Joanne Goode in the women's doubles and won gold as part of the England team in the mixed team event. In the English National Championships she won the mixed doubles three times and the women's doubles twice.

== Early life and career ==
Emms and Nathan Robertson reached the semi-finals of 1994 World Junior Championships held in Kuala Lumpur. In 1998 she graduated with a BSc (Hons) in Sports Science from Kingston University. After graduating Emms became a full-time professional badminton player with the help of national lottery funded grants paid to her by UK Sport. Her father owned a building firm that collapsed in the recession of the late 1980s leading to a sudden decline in the family standard of living. Her mother, Janice Emms (née Barton), played for the unofficial England women's national football team. Her parents divorced while Emms was in her early teens.

== 2004 Athens Summer Olympics ==
Emms competed in badminton at the 2004 Summer Olympics in women's doubles with partner Donna Kellogg. They defeated Koon Wai Chee and Li Wing Mui of Hong Kong in the first round but were defeated by Zhao Tingting and Wei Yili of China in the second round.

She also competed in mixed doubles with Robertson. They had a bye in the first round and defeated Björn Siegemund and Nicol Pitro of Germany in the second. In the quarterfinals, Emms and Robertson beat Chen Qiqiu and Zhao Tingting of China 15–8, 17–15 to advance to the semifinals. There, they beat Jonas Rasmussen and Rikke Olsen of Denmark 15–6, 15–12. In the final, they lost to the Chinese pair Zhang Jun and Gao Ling 1–15, 15–12, 12–15 to finish with the silver medal.

== 2006 Commonwealth Games ==
The 2006 Commonwealth Games brought Emms a silver in the team event, a bronze in the women's doubles (with Donna Kellogg) and a gold in the mixed doubles (with Nathan Robertson). An additional gold together with Robertson followed at the 2006 IBF World Championships.

== 2008 Beijing Summer Olympics ==
Emms participated in the women's doubles with partner Donna Kellogg only to be knocked out in the first round by the Chinese pair Wei Yili and Zhang Yawen. Emms then went on to win her first match in the mixed doubles with Nathan Robertson against the Chinese world number 2 pair. Emms and Robertson won the first game 21–16 before Gao Ling and her new partner Zheng Bo hit back to win the second 21–16. The British duo found themselves 12–17 down in the decider only to recover to win 21–19. Emms and Robertson lost out on a medal at the quarter final stage against the world number 10 pair and eventual gold medalist Lee Yong-dae and Lee Hyo-jung of South Korea.

Emms retired after the 2008 Olympic Games in Beijing.

== Later career ==
After 2008 Emms started a portfolio career and has engaged in badminton coaching, motivational speaking, media activities, TV commentary and product endorsements. The latter includes work for SKODA cars and Adidas. Emms has worked as a TV presenter and commentator for the BBC, Sky and BT Sport. She has delivered talks on performance, teamwork and gender issues at events held by many prominent clients including the Ashridge Business School, Sainsbury's and the Thames Valley Police.

In 2013 she was appointed to the Badminton England coaching staff with a remit to develop young female prospects and mixed doubles pairs. But loss of financial support for badminton from UK Sport in 2017 resulted in cutbacks to the coaching programmes which impacted on Emms' position.

Emms has appeared on the sports-based panel show A Question of Sport and is a regular guest on Fighting Talk. On 6 March 2014, she appeared on Sport Relief's Top Dog with her dog Raffa, a Westie. They won their heat, and went on to win the semi-final against Jenni Falconer on 20 March and the final, where they competed against Sally Gunnell.

== Personal life ==
Emms was appointed Member of the Order of the British Empire (MBE) in the 2009 Birthday Honours for services to badminton.

She gave birth to her first child, Harry, in March 2010 and to her second child, Oliver, in May 2013. In 2015 she was living in Milton Keynes with her partner. After retiring as a badminton player in 2008 Emms has periodically suffered from depression. She has spoken about the difficulty many professional athletes have in adjusting to life after retiring from their sport while still young.

Emms is a passionate supporter of Tottenham Hotspur. She participated in the 2017 Great North Run half marathon in order to raise money for SportsAid, finishing in a time of 1 hour and 48 minutes.

== Achievements ==
=== Olympic Games ===
Mixed doubles
Year	Venue	Partner	Opponent	Score	Result
2004	Goudi Olympic Hall, Athens, Greece	(United Kingdom) Nathan Robertson	(China) Zhang Jun (China) Gao Ling	1–15, 15–12, 12–15	Silver

=== World Championships ===
Mixed doubles
Year	Venue	Partner	Opponent	Score	Result
2006	Palacio de Deportes de la Comunidad, Madrid, Spain	(England) Nathan Robertson	(England) Anthony Clark (England) Donna Kellogg	21–15, 21–12	Gold

=== Commonwealth Games ===
Women's doubles
Year	Venue	Partner	Opponent	Score	Result
2002	Bolton Arena, Manchester, England	(England) Joanne Goode	(Malaysia) Ang Li Peng (Malaysia) Lim Pek Siah	4–7, 8–6, 6–8, 4–7	Bronze
2006	Melbourne Convention and Exhibition Centre, Melbourne, Australia	(England) Donna Kellogg	(India) Trupti Murgunde (India) Saina Nehwal	21–14, 21–9	Bronze

Mixed doubles
Year	Venue	Partner	Opponent	Score	Result
2006	Melbourne Convention and Exhibition Centre, Melbourne, Australia	(England) Nathan Robertson	(New Zealand) Daniel Shirley (New Zealand) Sara Petersen	21–17, 21–10	Gold

=== European Championships ===
Women's doubles
Year	Venue	Partner	Opponent	Score	Result
2006	Maaspoort Sports and Events, Den Bosch, Netherlands	(England) Donna Kellogg	(Germany) Nicole Grether (Germany) Juliane Schenk	21–12, 21–10	Gold
2008	Messecenter, Herning, Denmark	(England) Donna Kellogg	(Denmark) Lena Frier Kristiansen (Denmark) Kamilla Rytter Juhl	18–21, 18–21	Silver

Mixed doubles
Year	Venue	Partner	Opponent	Score	Result
2002	Baltiska Hallen, Malmö, Sweden	(England) Nathan Robertson	(Denmark) Jens Eriksen (Denmark) Mette Schjoldager	5–7, 3–7, 1–7	Silver
2004	Queue d’Arve Sport Center, Geneva, Switzerland	(England) Nathan Robertson	(Denmark) Jonas Rasmussen (Denmark) Rikke Olsen	15–3, 8–15, 15–5	Gold
2008	Messecenter, Herning, Denmark	(England) Nathan Robertson	(Poland) Robert Mateusiak (Poland) Nadieżda Kostiuczyk	21–14, 10–21, 6–21	Bronze

=== World University Championships ===
Women's doubles
Year	Venue	Partner	Opponent	Score	Result
1996	Strasbourg, France	(England) Tracey Hallam	(Chinese Taipei) Chen Li-chin (Chinese Taipei) Tsai Hui-min	12–15, 17–15, 11–15	Bronze
1998	Marmara University, Istanbul, Turkey	(England) Sara Hardaker	(Chinese Taipei) Chen Li-chin (Chinese Taipei) Tsai Hui-min		Bronze

Mixed doubles
Year	Venue	Partner	Opponent	Score	Result
1996	Strasbourg, France	(England) Richard Doling	(South Korea) Kim Young-gil (South Korea) Choi Ma-ree	7–15, 15–12, 7–15	Silver
1998	Marmara University, Istanbul, Turkey	(England) Lee Clapham	(China) Liang Yongping (China) Liu Lu		Bronze

=== World Junior Championships ===
Mixed doubles
Year	Venue	Partner	Opponent	Score	Result
1994	Kuala Lumpur Badminton Stadium, Kuala Lumpur, Malaysia	(England) Nathan Robertson	(China) Zhang Wei (China) Qiang Hong	14–17, 5–15	Bronze

=== European Junior Championships ===
Girls' doubles
Year	Venue	Partner	Opponent	Score	Result
1995	Športová hala Olympia, Nitra, Slovakia	(England) Ella Miles	(Russia) Natalia Djachkova (Russia) Ella Karachkova		Bronze

=== BWF Superseries ===
The BWF Superseries, which was launched on 14 December 2006 and implemented in 2007, is a series of elite badminton tournaments, sanctioned by the Badminton World Federation (BWF). Successful players are invited to the Superseries Finals, which are held at the end of each year.

Mixed doubles
Year	Tournament	Partner	Opponent	Score	Result
2007	Malaysia Open	(England) Nathan Robertson	(China) Zheng Bo (China) Gao Ling	12–21, 21–14, 15–21	(silver) Runner-up
2007	Denmark Open	(England) Nathan Robertson	(China) He Hanbin (China) Yu Yang	17–21, 21–19, 17–21	(silver) Runner-up

BWF Super Series Finals tournament
BWF Super Series tournament

=== IBF World Grand Prix ===
The World Badminton Grand Prix has been sanctioned by the International Badminton Federation from 1983 to 2006.

Women's doubles
Year	Tournament	Partner	Opponent	Score	Result
2000	U.S. Open	(England) Joanne Wright	(England) Emma Constable (England) Suzanne Rayappan	15–7, 15–1	(gold) Winner
2002	Swiss Open	(Netherlands) Lotte Jonathans	(South Korea) Lee Kyung-won (South Korea) Ra Kyung-min	1–7, 1–7, 1–7	(silver) Runner-up
2005	Korea Open	(England) Donna Kellogg	(South Korea) Lee Hyo-jung (South Korea) Lee Kyung-won	Walkover	(silver) Runner-up
2005	Thessaloniki Grand Prix	(England) Donna Kellogg	(Malaysia) Chor Hooi Yee (Malaysia) Lim Pek Siah	17–14, 15–8	(gold) Winner
2005	Denmark Open	(England) Donna Kellogg	(Japan) Kumiko Ogura (Japan) Reiko Shiota	6–15, 9–15	(silver) Runner-up
2006	Denmark Open	(England) Donna Kellogg	(Poland) Kamila Augustyn (Poland) Nadieżda Kostiuczyk	20–22, 10–21	(silver) Runner-up

Mixed doubles
Year	Tournament	Partner	Opponent	Score	Result
2000	U.S. Open	(England) Ian Sullivan	(Denmark) Jonas Rasmussen (Denmark) Jane F. Bramsen	15–8, 11–15, 13–15	(silver) Runner-up
2000	German Open	(England) Ian Sullivan	(Denmark) Jonas Rasmussen (Denmark) Jane F. Bramsen	3–15, 15–7, 4–15	(silver) Runner-up
2001	Dutch Open	(England) Nathan Robertson	(Netherlands) Chris Bruil (Netherlands) Lotte Jonathans	7–5, 3–7, 7–3, 7–4	(gold) Winner
2001	Denmark Open	(England) Nathan Robertson	(Indonesia) Tri Kusharjanto (Indonesia) Emma Ermawati	5–7, 1–7, 4–7	(silver) Runner-up
2002	Malaysia Open	(England) Nathan Robertson	(China) Wang Wei (China) Zhang Yawen	11–9, 11–4	(gold) Winner
2002	Singapore Open	(England) Nathan Robertson	(South Korea) Kim Dong-moon (South Korea) Ra Kyung-min	2–11, 10–13	(silver) Runner-up
2003	Thailand Open	(England) Nathan Robertson	(China) Chen Qiqiu (China) Zhao Tingting	4–11, 11–8, 0–11	(silver) Runner-up
2003	Malaysia Open	(England) Nathan Robertson	(South Korea) Kim Dong-moon (South Korea) Ra Kyung-min	6–15, 5–15	(silver) Runner-up
2004	Thailand Open	(England) Nathan Robertson	(Thailand) Sudket Prapakamol (Thailand) Saralee Thungthongkam	8–15, 15–12, 15–11	(gold) Winner
2004	Denmark Open	(England) Nathan Robertson	(China) Chen Qiqiu (China) Zhao Tingting	4–15, 11–15	(silver) Runner-up
2005	German Open	(England) Nathan Robertson	(South Korea) Lee Jae-jin (South Korea) Lee Hyo-jung	12–15, 14–17	(silver) Runner-up
2005	All England Open	(England) Nathan Robertson	(Denmark) Thomas Laybourn (Denmark) Kamilla Rytter Juhl	15–10, 15–12	(gold) Winner
2005	Swiss Open	(England) Nathan Robertson	(Indonesia) Nova Widianto (Indonesia) Liliyana Natsir	17–14, 15–6	(gold) Winner
2005	Hong Kong Open	(England) Nathan Robertson	(China) Xie Zhongbo (China) Zhang Yawen	8–15, 5–15	(silver) Runner-up
2005	China Open	(England) Nathan Robertson	(South Korea) Lee Jae-jin (South Korea) Lee Hyo-jung	15–10, 15–10	(gold) Winner
2006	Swiss Open	(England) Nathan Robertson	(England) Robert Blair (England) Natalie Munt	14–17, 15–7, 15–2	(gold) Winner
2006	All England Open	(England) Nathan Robertson	(China) Zhang Jun (China) Gao Ling	15–12, 14–17, 1–15	(silver) Runner-up
2006	Singapore Open	(England) Nathan Robertson	(Indonesia) Nova Widianto (Indonesia) Liliyana Natsir	16–21, 22–20, 21–23	(silver) Runner-up

=== IBF International ===
Women's doubles
Year	Tournament	Partner	Opponent	Score	Result
1995	Welsh International	(Netherlands) Lotte Jonathans	(Russia) Elena Rybkina (Russia) Marina Yakusheva	8–15, 4–15	(silver) Runner-up
1997	Austrian International	(England) Joanne Wright	(Germany) Karen Neumann (Germany) Nicol Pitro	3–15, 15–10, 8–15	(silver) Runner-up
1997	Czech International	(England) Rebecca Pantaney	(Switzerland) Judith Baumeyer (Switzerland) Santi Wibowo	9–2, 9–5, 9–1	(gold) Winner
1997	Norwegian International	(England) Rebecca Pantaney	(Denmark) Jane F. Bramsen (Denmark) Christina Sørensen	5–9, 6–9, 2–9	(silver) Runner-up
1998	Czech International	(England) Joanne Wright	(England) Lorraine Cole (England) Tracy Dineen	7–15, 6–15	(silver) Runner-up
1998	Irish International	(England) Joanne Wright	(Republic of Ireland) Keelin Fox (Scotland) Sonya McGinn	17–16, 15–10	(gold) Winner
1999	Spanish International	(England) Joanne Davies	(Japan) Takae Masumo (Japan) Chikako Nakayama	12–15, 11–15	(silver) Runner-up
1999	Welsh International	(England) Joanne Wright	(Russia) Irina Ruslyakova (Russia) Marina Yakusheva	14–17, 14–17	(silver) Runner-up
2000	Welsh International	(England) Joanne Wright	(England) Ella Miles (England) Sara Sankey	6–8, 4–7, 8–6, –	(silver) Runner-up

Mixed doubles
Year	Tournament	Partner	Opponent	Score	Result
1995	Hungarian International	(England) Nathan Robertson	(Austria) Jürgen Koch (Austria) Irina Serova	6–15, 8–15	(silver) Runner-up
1995	Irish International	(England) Nathan Robertson	(England) Julian Robertson (England) Lorraine Cole	4–15, 4–15	(silver) Runner-up
1996	Portugal International	(England) Nathan Robertson	(England) James Anderson (England) Emma Constable	12–15, 15–13, 18–13	(gold) Winner
1996	Norwegian International	(England) Julian Robertson	(Denmark) Jonas Rasmussen (Denmark) Ann-Lou Jørgensen	9–6, 2–9, 9–5, 9–5	(gold) Winner
1997	Czech International	(England) Ian Sullivan	(Sweden) Henrik Andersson (Sweden) Johanna Persson	11–8, 9–4, 9–3	(gold) Winner
1997	Welsh International	(England) Ian Sullivan	(England) James Anderson (England) Sara Sankey	6–15, 14–17	(silver) Runner-up
1998	Czech International	(England) Ian Sullivan	(England) Anthony Clark (England) Lorraine Cole	4–15, 13–15	(silver) Runner-up
1998	Scottish International	(England) Ian Sullivan	(Denmark) Michael Lamp (Denmark) Mette Schjoldager	10–15, 15–11, 12–15	(silver) Runner-up
1999	Portugal International	(England) Ian Sullivan	(Germany) Björn Siegemund (Germany) Karen Neumann	11–15, 15–12, 8–15	(silver) Runner-up
1999	French Open	(England) Ian Sullivan	(China) Chen Gang (China) Qin Yiyuan	12–15, 12–15	(silver) Runner-up
1999	Australian International	(England) Chris Hunt	(Germany) Michael Keck (Netherlands) Erica van den Heuvel	9–15, 10–15	(silver) Runner-up
1999	Spanish International	(England) Ian Sullivan	(Sweden) Fredrik Bergström (Sweden) Jenny Karlsson	7–15, 15–13, 15–10	(gold) Winner
2000	Welsh International	(England) Anthony Clark	(Sweden) Henrik Andersson (Sweden) Johanna Persson	7–4, 7–1, 7–0	(gold) Winner
2002	BMW Open International	(England) Nathan Robertson	(Denmark) Mathias Boe (Denmark) Rikke Olsen	11–9, 3–11, 11–9	(gold) Winner

== Record against selected opponents ==
Mixed doubles results with former partner Nathan Robertson against Superseries finalists, World Championships Semi-finalists, and Olympic quarterfinalists.

- (China) Chen Qiqiu & Zhao Tingting 3–4
- (China) Zhang Jun & Gao Ling 4–4
- (China) Zheng Bo & Gao Ling 0–3
- (China) He Hanbin & Yu Yang 2–1
- (China) Xie Zhongbo & Zhang Yawen 3–3
- (Denmark) Jens Eriksen & Mette Schjoldager 1–2
- (Denmark) Joachim Fischer Nielsen & Christinna Pedersen 1–0
- (Denmark) Thomas Laybourn & Kamilla Rytter Juhl 4–3
- (Denmark) Jonas Rasmussen & Rikke Olsen 4–1
- (Denmark) Michael Søgaard & Rikke Olsen 3–1
- (England) Simon Archer & Joanne Goode 1–0
- (England) Anthony Clark & Donna Kellogg 3–1
- (Indonesia) Flandy Limpele & Vita Marissa 2–1
- (Indonesia) Nova Widianto & Vita Marissa 2–3
- (Indonesia) Nova Widianto & Liliyana Natsir 4–5
- (South Korea) Kim Dong-moon & Ra Kyung-min 0–5
- (South Korea) Lee Yong-dae & Lee Hyo-jung 1–2
- (Poland) Robert Mateusiak & Nadieżda Zięba 2–1
- (Sweden) Fredrik Bergström & Johanna Persson 1–0
- (Thailand) Sudket Prapakamol & Saralee Thungthongkam 6–2
