= Sportclub Krefeld 05 =

Sports club in Krefeld, Germany

Club logo

Sportclub Krefeld 05 (until 2024: SC Bayer 05 Uerdingen) is one of the largest sports clubs in the city of Krefeld, North Rhine-Westphalia, Germany. As of 2021, it had over 6000 members. The club emerged from the 1995 dissolution of FC Bayer 05 Uerdingen, the football department of which is now known as KFC Uerdingen 05.

In 2020, the club entered into a joint venture with the German Cricket Federation to construct Germany's national cricket performance centre, which includes the Bayer Uerdingen Cricket Ground, an international standard facility. The performance centre is located adjacent to the club's Stadion am Löschenhofweg within the Covestro sports park, in Uerdingen, a district of Krefeld.

== See also ==
- Category:Bayer 05 Uerdingen athletes (2)
