= Monika Cassens =

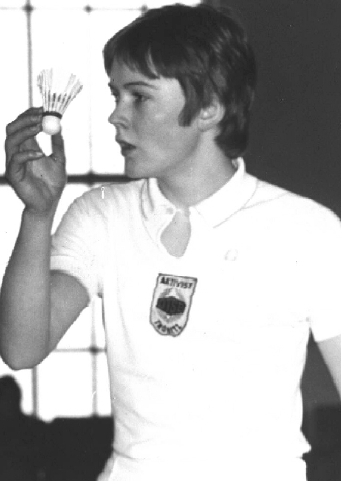

Personal information
- Born: Monika Thiere; 28 February 1953 (age 73) Prestewitz, Bezirk Cottbus, East Germany

Sport
- Country: East Germany; Germany
- Sport: Badminton
- Handedness: Left
- BWF profile
Medal record
Women's badminton
Representing East Germany
Helvetia Cup
Bronze medal – third place	1977 Leningrad	Mixed team
European Junior Championships
Bronze medal – third place	1971 Gottwaldov	Girls' singles

Monika Cassens (née Thiere, born 28 February 1953) is a German former badminton player.

She started her career in Tröbitz. For this club she won 15 national titles. After her marriage to Claus Cassens, she changed to SG Gittersee, a badminton club in Dresden. During her career she won 101 international tournaments. She won 6 Polish Open titles in a row in women's singles and women's doubles, and six titles in mixed doubles. In 1990 she won the Malta International.
