= Stefan Frey =

German badminton player

Personal information
- Country: Germany
- Born: 16 May 1959 (age 65); Worms, Rheinland-Pfalz, West Germany
- Height: 1.78 m (5 ft 10 in)
- Handedness: Right
Medal record
Men's badminton
Representing Germany
European Championships
Bronze medal – third place	1992 Glasgow	Men's doubles
- BWF profile

Stefan Frey (born 16 May 1959) is a German badminton player. Frey competed in the men's doubles tournament at the 1992 Summer Olympics.
