= Björn Siegemund =

German badminton player

Personal information
- Born: 30 September 1973 (age 53)

Sport
- Country: Germany
- Sport: Badminton
- Handedness: Right
- BWF profile

Björn Siegemund (born 30 September 1973) is a male badminton player from Germany.

He has two sons and a daughter.

== Career ==
Siegemund competed in badminton at the 2004 Summer Olympics in mixed doubles with partner Nicol Pitro. They defeated Travis Denney and Kate Wilson-Smith of Australia in the first round but lost to Nathan Robertson and Gail Emms of Great Britain in the round of 16.
