= Oliver Pongratz =

German badminton player

Personal information
- Nationality: German
- Born: 14 April 1973 (age 51); Mindelheim, West Germany

Sport
- Sport: Badminton

Oliver Pongratz (born 14 April 1973) is a German former badminton player. He competed in the men's singles tournament at the 1996 Summer Olympics.
