= Nicol Pitro =

German badminton player

Personal information
- Born: 7 October 1975 (age 50) Goslar, Niedersachsen, West Germany
- Height: 1.68 m (5 ft 6 in)

Sport
- Country: Germany
- Sport: Badminton
- Handedness: Left
- BWF profile
Medal record
Women's badminton
Representing Germany
European Championships
Bronze medal – third place	2002 Malmö	Women's doubles

Nicol Pitro (born 7 October 1975) is a female badminton player from Germany.

== Career ==
Pitro competed in badminton at the 2004 Summer Olympics in mixed doubles with partner Björn Siegemund. They defeated Travis Denney and Kate Wilson-Smith of Australia in the first round but lost to Nathan Robertson and Gail Emms of the United Kingdom in the round of 16.
