= 1998 Thomas Cup group stage =

Badminton team Tournament in Hong Kong

The 1998 Thomas Cup group stage was held at Queen Elizabeth Stadium in Hong Kong from 16 to 20 May 1998.

The group stage was first stage of the tournament where only the two highest-placing teams in each of the two groups advanced to the knockout stage.

== Draw ==
The 8 teams were drawn into two groups each containing four teams.

=== Group composition ===
Group
Group A	Group B
China; Denmark; Hong Kong (Host); Sweden	Indonesia; South Korea; Malaysia; Netherlands

== Group A ==
Pos	Team	Pld	W	L	GF	GA	GD	PF	PA	PD	Pts	Qualification
1	Denmark	3	3	0	26	9	+17	503	330	+173	3	Advance to semi-finals
2	China	3	2	1	25	10	+15	473	337	+136	2	Advance to semi-finals
3	Sweden	3	1	2	13	23	−10	345	472	−127	1	
4	Hong Kong (H)	3	0	3	6	28	−22	308	490	−182	0	

Source: The Straits Times
(H) Host

=== China vs Sweden ===
China
5
Queen Elizabeth Stadium
16 May 1998, 12:30 UTC+8

Sweden
0

			1	2	3
1	(China) (Sweden)	Sun Jun; Henrik Bengtsson	15; 7	15; 0
2	(China) (Sweden)	Liu Yong / Zhang Wei; Henrik Andersson / Peter Axelsson	15; 4	15; 9
3	(China) (Sweden)	Luo Yigang; Tomas Johansson	15; 11	15; 10
4	(China) (Sweden)	Yang Ming / Zhang Jun; Fredrik Bergström / Jens Olsson	15; 2	11; 11	15; 3
5	(China) (Sweden)	Dong Jiong; Daniel Eriksson	15; 10	12; 15	15; 10

=== Denmark vs Hong Kong ===
Denmark
4
Queen Elizabeth Stadium
16 May 1998, 18:30 UTC+8

Hong Kong
1

			1	2	3
1	(Denmark) (Hong Kong)	Peter Gade; Tam Kai Chuen	15; 2	18; 13
2	(Denmark) (Hong Kong)	Jon-Holst Christensen / Michael Sogaard; Liu Kwok Wa / Ma Che Kong	15; 10	17; 14
3	(Denmark) (Hong Kong)	Poul-Erik Hoyer Larsen; Ng Wei	15; 9	15; 7
4	(Denmark) (Hong Kong)	Jens Eriksen / Jesper Larsen; Chau Kin Man / Yau Kwun Yuen	15; 2	15; 7
5	(Denmark) (Hong Kong)	Peter Rasmussen; Liu Kwok Wa	14; 18	15; 6	10; 15

=== China vs Hong Kong ===
China
5
Queen Elizabeth Stadium
18 May 1998, 18:30 UTC+8

Hong Kong
0

			1	2	3
1	(China) (Hong Kong)	Luo Yigang; Tam Kai Chuen	15; 6	15; 4
2	(China) (Hong Kong)	Liu Yong / Yu Jinhao; Chau Kin Man / Ma Che Kong	15; 9	15; 6
3	(China) (Hong Kong)	Dong Jiong; Ng Wei	15; 9	15; 8
4	(China) (Hong Kong)	Zhang Wei / Zhang Jun; Tam Lok Tin / Yau Kwun Yuen	15; 2	15; 9
5	(China) (Hong Kong)	Chen Gang; Liu Kwok Wa	15; 0	15; 10

=== Denmark vs Sweden ===
Denmark
4
Queen Elizabeth Stadium
18 May 1998, 18:30 UTC+8

Sweden
1

			1	2	3
1	(Denmark) (Sweden)	Peter Gade; Henrik Bengtsson	15; 4	15; 5
2	(Denmark) (Sweden)	Jon-Holst Christensen / Michael Sogaard; Henrik Andersson / Fredrik Bergström	15; 3	15; 4
3	(Denmark) (Sweden)	Poul-Erik Hoyer Larsen; Tomas Johansson	15; 5	14; 17	8; 15
4	(Denmark) (Sweden)	Jim Laugesen / Thomas Stavngaard; Rikard Magnusson / Jens Olsson	15; 8	15; 7
5	(Denmark) (Sweden)	Kenneth Jonassen; Daniel Eriksson	15; 6	15; 3

=== Sweden vs Hong Kong ===
Sweden
4
Queen Elizabeth Stadium
20 May 1998, 18:30 UTC+8

Hong Kong
1

			1	2	3
1	(Sweden) (Hong Kong)	Tomas Johansson; Tam Kai Chuen	15; 8	15; 10
2	(Sweden) (Hong Kong)	Henrik Andersson / Fredrik Bergström; Liu Kwok Wa / Ma Che Kong	17; 14	11; 15	4; 15
3	(Sweden) (Hong Kong)	Rikard Magnusson; Ng Wei	9; 15	15; 4	15; 8
4	(Sweden) (Hong Kong)	Henrik Bengtsson / Jens Olsson; Yau Kwun Yuen / Chow Kin Man	15; 7	17; 16
5	(Sweden) (Hong Kong)	Daniel Eriksson; Liu Kwok Wa	13; 15	15; 9	15; 6

=== China vs Denmark ===
China
2
Queen Elizabeth Stadium
20 May 1998, 18:30 UTC+8

Denmark
3

			1	2	3
1	(China) (Denmark)	Sun Jun; Peter Gade	3; 15	16; 17
2	(China) (Denmark)	Liu Yong / Yu Jinhao; Jon-Holst Christensen / Michael Sogaard	16; 18	11; 15
3	(China) (Denmark)	Luo Yigang; Poul-Erik Hoyer Larsen	6; 15	17; 16	15; 10
4	(China) (Denmark)	Zhang Jun / Zhang Wei; Jens Eriksen / Jesper Larsen	2; 15	18; 15	17; 14
5	(China) (Denmark)	Dong Jiong; Kenneth Jonassen	6; 15	15; 2	8; 15

== Group B ==
Pos	Team	Pld	W	L	GF	GA	GD	PF	PA	PD	Pts	Qualification
1	Indonesia	3	3	0	27	5	+22	457	234	+223	3	Advance to semi-finals
2	Malaysia	3	2	1	21	11	+10	402	333	+69	2	Advance to semi-finals
3	South Korea	3	1	2	12	21	−9	327	415	−88	1	
4	Netherlands	3	0	3	4	27	−23	234	438	−204	0	

Source: The Straits Times

=== Indonesia vs Netherlands ===
Indonesia
5
Queen Elizabeth Stadium
16 May 1998, 12:30 UTC+8

Netherlands
0

			1	2	3
1	(Indonesia) (Netherlands)	Hariyanto Arbi; Jeroen van Dijk	15; 10	15; 10
2	(Indonesia) (Netherlands)	Rexy Mainaky / Ricky Subagja; Dennis Lens / Quinten van Dalm	15; 7	15; 1
3	(Indonesia) (Netherlands)	Hendrawan; Gerben Bruijstens	15; 5	15; 3
4	(Indonesia) (Netherlands)	Sigit Budiarto / Candra Wijaya; Norbert van Barneveld / Jurgen van Leeuwen	15; 5	15; 3
5	(Indonesia) (Netherlands)	Indra Wijaya; Joris van Soerland	15; 5	15; 6

=== Malaysia vs South Korea ===
Malaysia
4
Queen Elizabeth Stadium
16 May 1998, 18:30 UTC+8

South Korea
1

			1	2	3
1	(Malaysia) (South Korea)	Ong Ewe Hock; Hwang Sun-ho	15; 6	15; 10
2	(Malaysia) (South Korea)	Cheah Soon Kit / Yap Kim Hock; Lee Dong-soo / Yoo Yong-sung	14; 18	15; 8	15; 12
3	(Malaysia) (South Korea)	Yong Hock Kin; Ahn Jae-chang	15; 9	15; 7
4	(Malaysia) (South Korea)	Choong Tan Fook / Lee Wan Wah; Ha Tae-kwon / Kang Kyung-jin	5; 15	6; 15
5	(Malaysia) (South Korea)	Roslin Hashim; Kim Dong-moon	15; 13	15; 4

=== Indonesia vs South Korea ===
Indonesia
4
Queen Elizabeth Stadium
18 May 1998, 12:30 UTC+8

South Korea
1

			1	2	3
1	(Indonesia) (South Korea)	Hariyanto Arbi; Hwang Sun-ho	17; 14	15; 0
2	(Indonesia) (South Korea)	Rexy Mainaky / Ricky Subagja; Lee Dong-soo / Yoo Yong-sung	15; 9	15; 4
3	(Indonesia) (South Korea)	Marleve Mainaky; Jang Chun-woong	15; 2	15; 1
4	(Indonesia) (South Korea)	Sigit Budiarto / Candra Wijaya; Ha Tae-kwon / Kang Kyung-jin	15; 6	9; 15	15; 18
5	(Indonesia) (South Korea)	Joko Suprianto; Jun Jong-bae	15; 2	15; 1

=== Malaysia vs Netherlands ===
Malaysia
5
Queen Elizabeth Stadium
18 May 1998, 12:30 UTC+8

Netherlands
0

			1	2	3
1	(Malaysia) (Netherlands)	Ong Ewe Hock; Jeroen van Dijk	15; 3	15; 6
2	(Malaysia) (Netherlands)	Cheah Soon Kit / Yap Kim Hock; Dennis Lens / Quinten van Dalm	15; 5	15; 9
3	(Malaysia) (Netherlands)	Yong Hock Kin; Dicky Palyama	15; 6	15; 6
4	(Malaysia) (Netherlands)	Choong Tan Fook / Tan Kim Her; Norbert van Barneveld / Joris van Soerland	15; 7	15; 12
5	(Malaysia) (Netherlands)	Wong Choong Hann; Gerben Bruijstens	15; 4	15; 12

=== Indonesia vs Malaysia ===
Indonesia
4
Queen Elizabeth Stadium
20 May 1998, 12:30 UTC+8

Malaysia
1

			1	2	3
1	(Indonesia) (Malaysia)	Hendrawan; Yong Hock Kin	9; 15	15; 7	15; 2
2	(Indonesia) (Malaysia)	Rexy Mainaky / Ricky Subagja; Cheah Soon Kit / Choong Tan Fook	15; 7	15; 13
3	(Indonesia) (Malaysia)	Marleve Mainaky; Roslin Hashim	11; 15	6; 15
4	(Indonesia) (Malaysia)	Sigit Budiarto / Candra Wijaya; Lee Wan Wah / Tan Kim Her	15; 6	15; 7
5	(Indonesia) (Malaysia)	Indra Wijaya; Wong Choong Hann	15; 10	15; 10

=== South Korea vs Netherlands ===
South Korea
3
Queen Elizabeth Stadium
20 May 1998, 12:30 UTC+8

Netherlands
2

			1	2	3
1	(South Korea) (Netherlands)	Hwang Sun-ho; Jeroen van Dijk	15; 3	6; 15	5; 15
2	(South Korea) (Netherlands)	Lee Dong-soo / Yoo Yong-sung; Dennis Lens / Quinten van Dalm	15; 5	15; 9
3	(South Korea) (Netherlands)	Jang Chun-woong; Dicky Palyama	13; 15	9; 15
4	(South Korea) (Netherlands)	Ha Tae-kwon / Kang Kyung-jin; Norbert van Barneveld / Joris van Soerland	15; 6	15; 9
5	(South Korea) (Netherlands)	Ahn Jae-chang; Gerben Bruijstens	15; 7	15; 10
