= 1997 IBF World Championships – Men's doubles =

Men's doubles at the 1997 IBF World Championships
- Venue: Scotstoun Centre
- Location: Glasgow, Scotland
- Dates: May 24, 1997 – June 1, 1997

Medalists
gold medal	Candra Wijaya; Sigit Budiarto	Indonesia
silver medal	Yap Kim Hock; Cheah Soon Kit	Malaysia
bronze medal	Lee Dong-soo; Yoo Yong-sung	South Korea
bronze medal	Ricky Subagja; Rexy Mainaky	Indonesia

The 1997 IBF World Championships (Badminton) were held in Glasgow, Scotland, between 24 May and 1 June 1997. Following the results of the men's doubles.

== Main stage ==
=== Section 1 ===
Round 1
(Indonesia) Candra Wijaya (Indonesia) Sigit Budiarto	15	15
(Scotland) David Gilmour (Scotland) Gordon Haldane	6	2
(Chinese Taipei) Chien Yu-Hsun (Chinese Taipei) Huang Shih-chung	15	15
(Canada) Brian Abra (Canada) Jean Philippe Goyette	4	3
(Russia) Artur Khachaturjan (Russia) Sergei Melnikov	5	17	18
(Thailand) Siripong Siripool (Thailand) Khunakorn Sudhisodhi	15	14	14
(Finland) Lasse Lindelöf (Finland) Ilkka Nyqvist	15	15
(Switzerland) Rémy Matthey de l’Etang (Switzerland) Stephan Wapp	5	2
(Denmark) Jim Laugesen (Denmark) Thomas Stavngaard	15	15
(Belarus) Mikhail Korshuk (Belarus) Vitaliy Shmakov	8	9
(Bulgaria) Mihail Popov (Bulgaria) Svetoslav Stoyanov	15	15
(Sweden) Henrik Andersson (Sweden) Daniel Eriksson	10	8
(England) Nick Ponting (England) John Quinn	15	15
(Germany) Michael Keck (Germany) Christian Mohr	9	8
(Malaysia) Choong Tan Fook (Malaysia) Lee Wan Wah	17	15
(Portugal) Hugo Rodrigues (Portugal) Fernando Silva	15	9

Round 2
(Indonesia) Candra Wijaya (Indonesia) Sigit Budiarto	15	15
(Chinese Taipei) Chien Yu-Hsun (Chinese Taipei) Huang Shih-chung	9	2
(Russia) Artur Khachaturjan (Russia) Sergei Melnikov	18	15	15
(Finland) Lasse Lindelöf (Finland) Ilkka Nyqvist	17	18	11
(Denmark) Jim Laugesen (Denmark) Thomas Stavngaard	15	15
(Bulgaria) Mihail Popov (Bulgaria) Svetoslav Stoyanov	5	5
(England) Nick Ponting (England) John Quinn	17	15
(Malaysia) Choong Tan Fook (Malaysia) Lee Wan Wah	11	12

Round 3
(Indonesia) Candra Wijaya (Indonesia) Sigit Budiarto	15	15
(Russia) Artur Khachaturjan (Russia) Sergei Melnikov	2	8
(Denmark) Jim Laugesen (Denmark) Thomas Stavngaard	15	16	15
(England) Nick Ponting (England) John Quinn	3	18	13

Quarterfinal
(Indonesia) Candra Wijaya (Indonesia) Sigit Budiarto	18	15
(Denmark) Jim Laugesen (Denmark) Thomas Stavngaard	16	2

=== Section 2 ===
Round 1
(South Korea) Lee Dong-soo (South Korea) Yoo Yong-sung	15	15
(Scotland) Russell Hogg (Scotland) Kenny Middlemiss	6	13
(Australia) David Bamford (Australia) Peter Blackburn	15	13	15
(France) Manuel Dubrulle (France) Vincent Laigle	5	1
(China) Liu Yong (China) Zhang Wei	15	15
(Sri Lanka) Thushara Edirisinghe (Sri Lanka) Duminda Jayakody	1	7
(England) James Anderson (England) Ian Pearson	15	15
(Germany) Stephan Kuhl (Germany) Detlef Poste	9	11
(Sweden) Peter Axelsson (Sweden) Pär-Gunnar Jönsson	15	15
(Hong Kong) Chow Kin Man (Hong Kong) Ma Che Kong	8	7
(Japan) Keita Masuda (Japan) Tadashi Ohtsuka	8	15	15
(Canada) Mike Beres (Canada) Bryan Moody	15	7	6
(Indonesia) S. Antonius Budi Ariantho (Indonesia) Denny Kantono	15	15
(Chinese Taipei) Huang Chuan-Chen (Chinese Taipei) Lee Wei-Jen	6	1
(Malaysia) Chang Kim Wai (Malaysia) Cheah Soon Thoe	15	18
(Poland) Michał Łogosz (Poland) Damian Pławecki	6	16

Round 2
(South Korea) Lee Dong-soo (South Korea) Yoo Yong-sung	15	15
(Australia) David Bamford (Australia) Peter Blackburn	0	7
(China) Liu Yong (China) Zhang Wei	15	15
(England) James Anderson (England) Ian Pearson	10	3
(Sweden) Peter Axelsson (Sweden) Pär-Gunnar Jönsson	15	15
(Japan) Keita Masuda (Japan) Tadashi Ohtsuka	8	8
(Indonesia) S. Antonius Budi Ariantho (Indonesia) Denny Kantono	15	15
(Malaysia) Chang Kim Wai (Malaysia) Cheah Soon Thoe	10	9

Round 3
(South Korea) Lee Dong-soo (South Korea) Yoo Yong-sung	15	15
(China) Liu Yong (China) Zhang Wei	4	2
(Sweden) Peter Axelsson (Sweden) Pär-Gunnar Jönsson	15	15
(Indonesia) S. Antonius Budi Ariantho (Indonesia) Denny Kantono	11	13

Quarterfinal
(South Korea) Lee Dong-soo (South Korea) Yoo Yong-sung	17	17
(Sweden) Peter Axelsson (Sweden) Pär-Gunnar Jönsson	16	14

=== Section 3 ===
Round 1
(Malaysia) Yap Kim Hock (Malaysia) Cheah Soon Kit	15	15
(Scotland) Alastair Gatt (Scotland) Craig Robertson	6	8
(Japan) Norio Imai (Japan) Hiroshi Ohyama	15	17
(England) Anthony Clark (England) Ian Sullivan	8	15
(Indonesia) Tony Gunawan (Indonesia) Victo Wibowo	15	15
(China) Yang Ming (China) Zhang Jun	6	11
(Bulgaria) Boris Kessov (Bulgaria) Tzvetozar Kolev	15	15	15
(Norway) Jim Ronny Andersen (Norway) Trond Wåland	17	12	5
(Denmark) Jon Holst-Christensen (Denmark) Michael Søgaard	13	15	15
(Thailand) Kitipon Kitikul (Thailand) Pramote Teerawiwatana	15	7	12
(Iceland) Árni Þór Hallgrímsson (Iceland) Broddi Kristjánsson	15	15
(Slovenia) Simon Hawlina (Slovenia) Andrej Pohar	5	7
(Germany) Michael Helber (Germany) Björn Siegemund	15	15
(India) Jaseel P. Ismail (India) Vijaydeep Singh	9	10
(South Korea) Ha Tae-kwon (South Korea) Kang Kyung-jin	15	15
(Sweden) Fredrik Bergström (Sweden) Rasmus Wengberg	1	8

Round 2
(Malaysia) Yap Kim Hock (Malaysia) Cheah Soon Kit	15	15
(Japan) Norio Imai (Japan) Hiroshi Ohyama	5	8
(Indonesia) Tony Gunawan (Indonesia) Victo Wibowo	15	15
(Bulgaria) Boris Kessov (Bulgaria) Tzvetozar Kolev	7	4
(Denmark) Jon Holst-Christensen (Denmark) Michael Søgaard	15	15
(Iceland) Árni Þór Hallgrímsson (Iceland) Broddi Kristjánsson	10	2
(Germany) Michael Helber (Germany) Björn Siegemund	16	12
(South Korea) Ha Tae-kwon (South Korea) Kang Kyung-jin	17	8	Aufg.

Round 3
(Malaysia) Yap Kim Hock (Malaysia) Cheah Soon Kit	15	17
(Indonesia) Tony Gunawan (Indonesia) Victo Wibowo	7	15
(Denmark) Jon Holst-Christensen (Denmark) Michael Søgaard	15	15
(Germany) Michael Helber (Germany) Björn Siegemund	8	4

Quarterfinal
(Malaysia) Yap Kim Hock (Malaysia) Cheah Soon Kit	15	15
(Denmark) Jon Holst-Christensen (Denmark) Michael Søgaard	12	12

=== Section 4 ===
Round 1
(Indonesia) Ricky Subagja (Indonesia) Rexy Mainaky	18	15
(Germany) Björn Decker (Austria) Jürgen Koch	14	2
(Chinese Taipei) Lee Sung-Yuan (Chinese Taipei) Lin Wei-Hsiang	15	15
(South Korea) Kim Yong-hyun (South Korea) Yim Bang-eun	6	5
(China) Ge Cheng (China) Tao Xiaoqiang	15	15
(Chinese Taipei) Tsai Jai-Lin (Chinese Taipei) Wei Chun-Yi	6	7
(Malaysia) Chew Choon Eng (Malaysia) Rosman A. Razak	15	13	15
(Netherlands) Dennis Lens (Netherlands) Quinten van Dalm	7	18	8
(Russia) Andrey Antropov (Russia) Nikolay Zuyev	17	15
(Republic of Ireland) Donal O'Halloran (Republic of Ireland) Michael O'Meara	14	3
(Ukraine) Valeriy Strelcov (Ukraine) Konstantin Tatranov	12	15	15
(France) Bertrand Gallet (France) Sydney Lengagne	15	3	10
(Denmark) Jens Eriksen (Denmark) Jesper Larsen	17	15
(Spain) Ernesto Garcia (Spain) Arturo Ruiz	7	10
(England) Simon Archer (England) Chris Hunt	15	15
(Canada) Brent Olynyk (Canada) Iain Sydie	7	2

Round 2
(Indonesia) Ricky Subagja (Indonesia) Rexy Mainaky	15	15
(Chinese Taipei) Lee Sung-Yuan (Chinese Taipei) Lin Wei-Hsiang	10	1
(China) Ge Cheng (China) Tao Xiaoqiang	17	15
(Malaysia) Chew Choon Eng (Malaysia) Rosman A. Razak	15	12
(Russia) Andrey Antropov (Russia) Nikolay Zuyev	15	15
(Ukraine) Valeriy Strelcov (Ukraine) Konstantin Tatranov	3	7
(Denmark) Jens Eriksen (Denmark) Jesper Larsen	18	15
(England) Simon Archer (England) Chris Hunt	14	5

Round 3
(Indonesia) Ricky Subagja (Indonesia) Rexy Mainaky	15	15
(China) Ge Cheng (China) Tao Xiaoqiang	6	11
(Russia) Andrey Antropov (Russia) Nikolay Zuyev	15	18
(Denmark) Jens Eriksen (Denmark) Jesper Larsen	7	16

Quarterfinal
(Indonesia) Ricky Subagja (Indonesia) Rexy Mainaky	15	15
(Russia) Andrey Antropov (Russia) Nikolay Zuyev	10	10

== Final stage ==
Quarterfinals
1	(Indonesia) Candra Wijaya (Indonesia) Sigit Budiarto	18	15
(Denmark) Jim Laugesen (Denmark) Thomas Stavngaard	16	2
12	(South Korea) Lee Dong-soo (South Korea) Yoo Yong-sung	17	17
(Sweden) Peter Axelsson (Sweden) Pär-Gunnar Jönsson	16	14
2	(Malaysia) Yap Kim Hock (Malaysia) Cheah Soon Kit	15	15
(Denmark) Jon Holst-Christensen (Denmark) Michael Søgaard	12	12
3	(Indonesia) Ricky Subagja (Indonesia) Rexy Mainaky	15	15
(Russia) Andrey Antropov (Russia) Nikolay Zuyev	10	10

Semifinals
1	(Indonesia) Candra Wijaya (Indonesia) Sigit Budiarto	15	15
12	(South Korea) Lee Dong-soo (South Korea) Yoo Yong-sung	11	11
2	(Malaysia) Yap Kim Hock (Malaysia) Cheah Soon Kit	15	2	15
3	(Indonesia) Ricky Subagja (Indonesia) Rexy Mainaky	9	15	12

Finals
1	(Indonesia) Candra Wijaya (Indonesia) Sigit Budiarto	8	18	15
2	(Malaysia) Yap Kim Hock (Malaysia) Cheah Soon Kit	15	17	7
