= 1998 Uber Cup group stage =

Badminton team Tournament in Hong Kong

The 1998 Uber Cup group stage was held at Queen Elizabeth Stadium in Hong Kong from 15 to 19 May 1998.

The group stage was first stage of the tournament where only the two highest-placing teams in each of the two groups advanced to the knockout stage.

== Draw ==
The 8 teams will be drawn into two groups each containing four teams.

=== Group composition ===
Group
Group A	Group B
China; Denmark; Hong Kong (Host); Japan	England; Indonesia; South Korea; Netherlands

== Group A ==
Pos	Team	Pld	W	L	GF	GA	GD	PF	PA	PD	Pts	Qualification
1	China	3	3	0	29	2	+27	371	141	+230	3	Advance to semi-finals
2	Denmark	3	2	1	19	13	+6	303	281	+22	2	Advance to semi-finals
3	Japan	3	1	2	13	22	−9	293	357	−64	1	
4	Hong Kong (H)	3	0	3	5	29	−24	226	414	−188	0	

Source: The Straits Times
(H) Host

=== China vs Hong Kong ===
China
5
Queen Elizabeth Stadium
15 May 1998, 18:30 UTC+8

Hong Kong
0

			1	2	3
1	(China) (Hong Kong)	Gong Zhichao; Koon Wai Chee	11; 1	11; 2
2	(China) (Hong Kong)	Qin Yiyuan / Tang Yongshu; Koon Wai Chee / Tung Chau Man	15; 8	15; 10
3	(China) (Hong Kong)	Dai Yun; Ling Wan Ting	11; 6	11; 4
4	(China) (Hong Kong)	Liu Lu / Qiang Hong; Chan Mei Mei / Ling Wan Ting	15; 6	15; 0
5	(China) (Hong Kong)	Han Jingna; Ng Ching	11; 3	11; 1

=== Denmark vs Japan ===
Denmark
5
Queen Elizabeth Stadium
15 May 1998, 18:30 UTC+8

Japan
0

			1	2	3
1	(Denmark) (Japan)	Camilla Martin; Kanako Yonekura	12; 10	11; 12	11; 7
2	(Denmark) (Japan)	Rikke Olsen / Marlene Thomsen; Yoshiko Iwata / Haruko Matsuda	15; 6	15; 9
3	(Denmark) (Japan)	Mette Pedersen; Yasuko Mizui	11; 4	11; 6
4	(Denmark) (Japan)	Ann Jørgensen / Camilla Martin; Chihiro Ōsaka / Kanako Yonekura	15; 3	15; 8
5	(Denmark) (Japan)	Mette Sørensen; Hiroko Nagamine	11; 4	11; 1

=== China vs Japan ===
China
4
Queen Elizabeth Stadium
17 May 1998, 18:30 UTC+8

Japan
1

			1	2	3
1	(China) (Japan)	Ye Zhaoying; Kanako Yonekura	11; 5	11; 7
2	(China) (Japan)	Ge Fei / Gu Jun; Yoshiko Iwata / Haruko Matsuda	15; 2	15; 6
3	(China) (Japan)	Gong Zhichao; Yasuko Mizui	11; 4	1; 11	3; 11
4	(China) (Japan)	Liu Lu / Qiang Hong; Satomi Igawa / Hiroko Nagamine	15; 5	15; 10
5	(China) (Japan)	Han Jingna; Chihiro Ōsaka	11; 4	11; 0

=== Denmark vs Hong Kong ===
Denmark
4
Queen Elizabeth Stadium
17 May 1998, 18:30 UTC+8

Hong Kong
1

			1	2	3
1	(Denmark) (Hong Kong)	Camilla Martin; Koon Wai Chee	11; 1	11; 8
2	(Denmark) (Hong Kong)	Mette Pedersen; Ling Wan Ting	11; 6	9; 12	3; 11
3	(Denmark) (Hong Kong)	Rikke Olsen / Marlene Thomsen; Koon Wai Chee / Tung Chau Man	15; 10	15; 7
4	(Denmark) (Hong Kong)	Mette Sørensen; Ng Ching	11; 5	11; 3
5	(Denmark) (Hong Kong)	Ann Jørgensen / Majken Vange; Chan Mei Mei / Ling Wan Ting	18; 13	15; 9

=== China vs Denmark ===
China
5
Queen Elizabeth Stadium
19 May 1998, 18:30 UTC+8

Denmark
0

			1	2	3
1	(China) (Denmark)	Ye Zhaoying; Mette Pedersen	11; 2	11; 1
2	(China) (Denmark)	Ge Fei / Gu Jun; Ann Jørgensen / Majken Vange	15; 4	15; 2
3	(China) (Denmark)	Gong Zhichao; Mette Sørensen	11; 3	11; 5
4	(China) (Denmark)	Qin Yiyuan / Tang Yongshu; Pernille Harder / Helene Kirkegaard	15; 7	15; 3
5	(China) (Denmark)	Dai Yun; Anne Søndergaard	11; 2	11; 6

=== Japan vs Hong Kong ===
Japan
5
Queen Elizabeth Stadium
19 May 1998, 18:30 UTC+8

Hong Kong
0

			1	2	3
1	(Japan) (Hong Kong)	Kanako Yonekura; Koon Wai Chee	11; 7	11; 3
2	(Japan) (Hong Kong)	Yoshiko Iwata / Haruko Matsuda; Koon Wai Chee / Tung Chau Man	15; 3	15; 3
3	(Japan) (Hong Kong)	Yasuko Mizui; Ling Wan Ting	11; 7	5; 11	11; 1
4	(Japan) (Hong Kong)	Akiko Nakajima / Chihiro Ōsaka; Chan Mei Mei / Ling Wan Ting	17; 18	15; 8	17; 14
5	(Japan) (Hong Kong)	Hiroko Nagamine; Ng Ching	11; 9	8; 11	11; 5

== Group B ==
Pos	Team	Pld	W	L	GF	GA	GD	PF	PA	PD	Pts	Qualification
1	Indonesia	3	3	0	24	11	+13	389	275	+114	3	Advance to semi-finals
2	South Korea	3	2	1	24	10	+14	370	279	+91	2	Advance to semi-finals
3	England	3	1	2	12	22	−10	280	371	−91	1	
4	Netherlands	3	0	3	9	26	−17	293	407	−114	0	

Source: The Straits Times

=== Indonesia vs England ===
Indonesia
5
Queen Elizabeth Stadium
15 May 1998, 12:30 UTC+8

England
0

			1	2	3
1	(Indonesia) (England)	Susi Susanti; Julia Mann	11; 0	11; 1
2	(Indonesia) (England)	Eliza Nathanael / Zelin Resiana; Joanne Goode / Donna Kellogg	15; 10	9; 15	18; 17
3	(Indonesia) (England)	Meiluawati; Rebecca Pantaney	11; 2	11; 0
4	(Indonesia) (England)	Indarti Issolina / Deyana Lomban; Joanne Davies / Sarah Hardaker	15; 8	15; 4
5	(Indonesia) (England)	Cindana Hartono; Tracey Hallam	11; 1	11; 0

=== South Korea vs Netherlands ===
South Korea
5
Queen Elizabeth Stadium
15 May 1998, 12:30 UTC+8

Netherlands
0

			1	2	3
1	(South Korea) (Netherlands)	Kim Ji-hyun; Judith Meulendijks	12; 10	12; 10
2	(South Korea) (Netherlands)	Jang Hye-ock / Ra Kyung-min; Monique Hoogland / Erica van den Heuvel	15; 8	15; 4
3	(South Korea) (Netherlands)	Lee Joo-hyun; Brenda Beenhakker	11; 3	11; 5
4	(South Korea) (Netherlands)	Kim Mee-hyang / Kim Shin-young; Lotte Jonathans / Nicole van Hooren	10; 15	15; 1	15; 9
5	(South Korea) (Netherlands)	Lee Kyung-won; Carolien Glebbeek	11; 5	11; 5

=== Indonesia vs Netherlands ===
Indonesia
3
Queen Elizabeth Stadium
17 May 1998, 12:30 UTC+8

Netherlands
2

			1	2	3
1	(Indonesia) (Netherlands)	Mia Audina; Judith Meulendijks	11; 2	11; 7
2	(Indonesia) (Netherlands)	Deyana Lomban / Eliza Nathanael; Monique Hoogland / Erica van den Heuvel	15; 7	17; 15
3	(Indonesia) (Netherlands)	Meiluawati; Brenda Beenhakker	12; 9	5; 11	7; 11
4	(Indonesia) (Netherlands)	Finarsih / Indarti Issolina; Lotte Jonathans / Nicole van Hooren	15; 18	15; 3	9; 15
5	(Indonesia) (Netherlands)	Ellen Angelina; Lonneke Janssen	11; 2	11; 7

=== South Korea vs England ===
South Korea
4
Queen Elizabeth Stadium
17 May 1998, 12:30 UTC+8

England
1

			1	2	3
1	(South Korea) (England)	Kim Ji-hyun; Julia Mann	11; 2	11; 2
2	(South Korea) (England)	Jang Hye-ock / Ra Kyung-min; Joanne Goode / Donna Kellogg	15; 9	15; 7
3	(South Korea) (England)	Lee Joo-hyun; Tracey Hallam	11; 2	8; 11	12; 10
4	(South Korea) (England)	Chung Jae-hee / Kim Shin-young; Joanne Davies / Sarah Hardaker	14; 17	2; 15
5	(South Korea) (England)	Lee Soon-deuk; Tracy Dineen	12; 10	11; 7

=== Indonesia vs South Korea ===
Indonesia
3
Queen Elizabeth Stadium
19 May 1998, 12:30 UTC+8

South Korea
2

			1	2	3
1	(Indonesia) (South Korea)	Susi Susanti; Kim Ji-hyun	11; 2	11; 3
2	(Indonesia) (South Korea)	Eliza Nathanael / Zelin Resiana; Jang Hye-ock / Ra Kyung-min	9; 15	10; 15
3	(Indonesia) (South Korea)	Mia Audina; Lee Joo-hyun	11; 5	3; 11	11; 5
4	(Indonesia) (South Korea)	Indarti Issolina / Deyana Lomban; Kim Mee-hyang / Kim Shin-young	15; 10	7; 15	15; 7
5	(Indonesia) (South Korea)	Cindana Hartono; Lee Kyung-won	6; 11	3; 11

=== England vs Netherlands ===
England
4
Queen Elizabeth Stadium
19 May 1998, 12:30 UTC+8

Netherlands
1

			1	2	3
1	(England) (Netherlands)	Julia Mann; Judith Meulendijks	12; 11	11; 8
2	(England) (Netherlands)	Donna Kellogg; Brenda Beenhakker	3; 11	7; 11
3	(England) (Netherlands)	Joanne Davies / Sarah Hardaker; Lotte Jonathans / Nicole van Hooren	17; 16	15; 11
4	(England) (Netherlands)	Tracey Hallam; Lonneke Janssen	11; 3	3; 11	11; 7
5	(England) (Netherlands)	Joanne Goode / Donna Kellogg; Erica van den Heuvel / Monique Hoogland	15; 1	10; 15	15; 6
