= 1998 Thomas Cup knockout stage =

1998 Knockout stage of the Thomas Cup badminton team championship

The knockout stage for the 1998 Thomas Cup in Hong Kong began on 22 May 1998 with the semi-finals and ended on 24 May 1998 with the final.

== Qualified teams ==
The top two placed teams from each of the two groups qualified for this stage.

Group	Winners	Runners-up
A	Denmark	China
B	Indonesia	Malaysia

== Bracket ==
Semi-finals
Denmark	2
Malaysia	3
China	2
Indonesia	3

Final
Malaysia	2
Indonesia	3

== Semi-finals ==
=== Semi-final 1 ===
Denmark
2
Queen Elizabeth Stadium
22 May 1998, 12:30 UTC+8

Malaysia
3

			1	2	3
1	(Denmark) (Malaysia)	Peter Gade; Ong Ewe Hock	15; 7	15; 10
2	(Denmark) (Malaysia)	Jon-Holst Christensen / Michael Sogaard; Cheah Soon Kit / Choong Tan Fook	11; 15	15; 12	14; 18
3	(Denmark) (Malaysia)	Poul-Erik Hoyer-Larsen; Yong Hock Kin	11; 15	18; 14	11; 15
4	(Denmark) (Malaysia)	Jens Eriksen / Jesper Larsen; Tan Kim Her / Yap Kim Hock	17; 16	15; 12
5	(Denmark) (Malaysia)	Kenneth Jonassen; Roslin Hashim	18; 15	5; 15	8; 15

=== Semi-final 2 ===
Indonesia
3
Queen Elizabeth Stadium
22 May 1998, 19:00 UTC+8

China
2

			1	2	3
1	(Indonesia) (China)	Hariyanto Arbi; Sun Jun	18; 17	4; 15	1; 15
2	(Indonesia) (China)	Rexy Mainaky / Ricky Subagja; Liu Yong / Zhang Wei	15; 6	15; 2
3	(Indonesia) (China)	Hendrawan; Luo Yigang	15; 9	15; 4
4	(Indonesia) (China)	Sigit Budiarto / Candra Wijaya; Yang Ming / Yu Jinhao	15; 3	15; 6
5	(Indonesia) (China)	Indra Wijaya; Dong Jiong	10; 15	15; 17

== Final ==
Indonesia
3
Queen Elizabeth Stadium
24 May 1998, 19:00 UTC+8

Malaysia
2

			1	2	3
1	(Indonesia) (Malaysia)	Hariyanto Arbi; Ong Ewe Hock	14; 18	7; 15
2	(Indonesia) (Malaysia)	Rexy Mainaky / Ricky Subagja; Cheah Soon Kit / Yap Kim Hock	15; 3	18; 15
3	(Indonesia) (Malaysia)	Hendrawan; Yong Hock Kin	18; 14	10; 15	15; 5
4	(Indonesia) (Malaysia)	Sigit Budiarto / Candra Wijaya; Choong Tan Fook / Lee Wan Wah	15; 11	15; 12
5	(Indonesia) (Malaysia)	Joko Suprianto; Roslin Hashim	10; 15	15; 11	2; 15
