= JST =

JST may refer to:

- Beijing Jishuitan Hospital
- Japan Science and Technology Corporation (est. 1996)
- Japan Science and Technology Agency (est. 2003)
- Japan Standard Time
- Jesuit School of Theology of Santa Clara University
- Journal of Scientific Temper
- Johnstown–Cambria County Airport (IATA: JST, FAA LID: JST)
- Joseph Smith Translation of the Bible
- JST connector, electrical connectors manufactured by J.S.T. Mfg. Co. (Japan Solderless Terminal)
- Jubilee Sailing Trust
- Weston Jesuit School of Theology
- Joint Supervisory Team, a regulatory function of the European Central Bank for each of the national supervisors.
