= Jishuitan =

Jishuitan may refer to:

- Beijing Jishuitan Hospital, in Beijing, China
- Jishuitan station, station on Line 2 & Line 19, Beijing Subway
