= 2015 BWF World Senior Championships – 40+ =

Tournament details
- Dates: 20 September 2015 – 26 September 2015
- Edition: 7
- Level: International
- Competitors: 234 from 31 nations
- Venue: Helsingborg Arena
- Location: Helsingborg, Sweden

Champions
- Men's singles: (Denmark) Peter Rasmussen
- Women's singles: (Netherlands) Georgy Van Soerland-Trouerbach
- Men's doubles: (Indonesia) Hariyanto Arbi (Indonesia) Tri Kusharjanto
- Women's doubles: (Russia) Natalja Gonchar (Russia) Olga Kuznetsova
- Mixed doubles: (Denmark) Carsten Loesch (Denmark) Dorte Steenberg

This are the results of 2015 BWF World Senior Championships' 40+ events.

== Medalist ==
Event	Gold	Silver	Bronze
Men's singles	(Denmark) Peter Rasmussen	(Austria) Jürgen Koch	(Denmark) Gregers Schytt
Men's singles	(Denmark) Peter Rasmussen	(Austria) Jürgen Koch	(Portugal) Fernando Silva
Women's singles	(Netherlands) Georgy Van Soerland-Trouerbach	(Denmark) Pernille Strøm	(Netherlands) Marielle van der Woerdt
Women's singles	(Netherlands) Georgy Van Soerland-Trouerbach	(Denmark) Pernille Strøm	(Iceland) Elsa Nielsen
Men's doubles	(Indonesia) Hariyanto Arbi (Indonesia) Tri Kusharjanto	(Denmark) Peter Rasmussen (Denmark) Thomas Stavngaard	(Indonesia) Dharma Gunawi (Austria) Jürgen Koch
Men's doubles	(Indonesia) Hariyanto Arbi (Indonesia) Tri Kusharjanto	(Denmark) Peter Rasmussen (Denmark) Thomas Stavngaard	(England) Carl Jennings (England) Mark King
Women's doubles	(Russia) Natalja Gonchar (Russia) Olga Kuznetsova	(Hungary) Gondáné Fórián Csilla (Bulgaria) Reni Hassan	(England) Tracey Middleton (England) Joanne Muggeridge
Women's doubles	(Russia) Natalja Gonchar (Russia) Olga Kuznetsova	(Hungary) Gondáné Fórián Csilla (Bulgaria) Reni Hassan	(Germany) Michaela Hukriede (Germany) Stefanie Ruberg
Mixed doubles	(Denmark) Carsten Loesch (Denmark) Dorte Steenberg	(Sweden) Erik Sjöstedt (Sweden) Nilofar Mosavar Rahmani	(Russia) Vadim Nazarov (Russia) Olga Kuznetsova
Mixed doubles	(Denmark) Carsten Loesch (Denmark) Dorte Steenberg	(Sweden) Erik Sjöstedt (Sweden) Nilofar Mosavar Rahmani	(England) Carl Jennings (England) Joanne Muggeridge

== Men's singles ==
=== Seeds ===
1. (Denmark) Peter Rasmussen (champion, gold medal)
2. (Portugal) Fernando Silva (semifinals, bronze medal)
3. (Spain) Mario Carulla (withdrew)
4. (Denmark) Carsten Loesch (fourth round)
5. (France) Fabrice Bernabé (quarterfinals)
6. (Germany) Marc Götze (second round)
7. (Indonesia) Dharma Gunawi (quarterfinals)
8. (Denmark) Gregers Schytt (semifinals, bronze medal)
9. (Sweden) Fredrik Bohlin (fourth round)
10. (Austria) Jürgen Koch (final, silver medal)
11. (Russia) Sergey Makin (second round)
12. (England) Daniel Plant (fourth round)
13. (India) Vijay Sharma (fourth round)
14. (Japan) Tajuya Yamamoto (fourth round)
15. (Indonesia) Hendrady Perdana (second round)
16. (Germany) Andreas Schlüter (fourth round)

=== Finals ===
Quarterfinals
1	(Denmark) Peter Rasmussen	21	21
(Netherlands) Gerben Bruijstens	3	10
(Sweden) Mikael Nilsson	5	10
8	(Denmark) Gregers Schytt	21	21
5	(France) Fabrice Bernabé	18	2
10	(Austria) Jürgen Koch	21	21
7	(Indonesia) Dharma Gunawi	16	13
2	(Portugal) Fernando Silva	21	21

Semifinals
1	(Denmark) Peter Rasmussen	21	21
8	(Denmark) Gregers Schytt	16	9
10	(Austria) Jürgen Koch	21	21
2	(Portugal) Fernando Silva	13	12

Final
1	(Denmark) Peter Rasmussen	21	21
10	(Austria) Jürgen Koch	17	11

=== Top half ===
==== Section 1 ====
First Round

Second Round
1	(Denmark) P Rasmussen	21	21
(Russia) D Makarenkov	6	3
(Poland) R Śmierzchalski	13	21	21
(India) A Salvi	21	10	4
9	(Sweden) F Bohlin	21	21
(Switzerland) D S Bachmann	2	4
(Norway) G Olsen	15	11
(Czech Republic) M Koudelka	21	21

Third Round
1	(Denmark) P Rasmussen	21	21
(Poland) R Śmierzchalski	19	7
9	(Sweden) F Bohlin	21	21
(Czech Republic) M Koudelka	7	12

Fourth Round
1	(Denmark) P Rasmussen	21	21
9	(Sweden) F Bohlin	5	9

==== Section 2 ====
First Round
(Japan) G Egashira	21	23
(Chinese Taipei) Huang C-l	19	21

Second Round
6	(Germany) M Götze	19	21	24
(Austria) H Hochgatterer	21	18	26
(Netherlands) G Bruijstens	21	21
(Finland) T Lehtosaari	18	14
12	(England) D Plant	21	21
(Thailand) S Wiriyachaikeg	18	17
(France) G Barbieri	21	21
(Japan) G Egashira	15	9

Third Round
(Austria) H Hochgatterer	20	22	17
(Netherlands) G Bruijstens	22	20	21
12	(England) D Plant	21	21
(France) G Barbieri	4	6

Fourth Round
(Netherlands) G Bruijstens	21	21
12	(England) D Plant	19	18

==== Section 3 ====
First Round
(India) T Chauhan	21	16	10
(Norway) T-G Morskogen	17	21	21

Second Round
3	(Spain) M Carulla
(Germany) B Schneider	w	/	o
(Malaysia) Lee C W	2	5
(England) C Jennings	21	21
11	(Russia) S Makin	3	16
(Sweden) M Nilsson	21	21
(Switzerland) G Locher	6	8
(Norway) T-G Morskogen	21	21

Third Round
(Germany) B Schneider	11	21	18
(England) C Jennings	21	10	21
(Sweden) M Nilsson	21	15	21
(Norway) T-G Morskogen	17	21	10

Fourth Round
(England) C Jennings	12	21	19
(Sweden) M Nilsson	21	14	21

==== Section 4 ====
First Round
(Austria) T El-Dabbagh	21	21
(Finland) P Salhoja	14	9

Second Round
8	(Denmark) G Schytt	21	21
(Poland) A Cimosz	7	10
(Czech Republic) J Port	21	11	10
(France) R Didier	17	21	21
15	(Indonesia) H Perdana	7	8
(Japan) K Suzuki	21	21
(Belgium) Y H Siu	10	21	21
(Austria) T El-Dabbagh	21	16	16

Third Round
8	(Denmark) G Schytt	21	21
(France) R Didier	15	11
(Japan) K Suzuki	10	15
(Belgium) Y H Siu	21	21

Fourth Round
8	(Denmark) G Schytt	21	21
(Belgium) Y H Siu	5	8

=== Bottom half ===
==== Section 5 ====
First Round
(Thailand) N Sroidokson	18	18
(Russia) I Ivanov	21	21

Second Round
(Russia) I Ivanov	20	21	21
(Romania) D A Dehelean	22	13	11
(Nepal) S Shrestha
14	(Japan) T Yamamoto	w	/	o
(Spain) C Vidstein	10	14
(Belgium) S Verbruggen	21	21
(England) B A. Richards	12	10
5	(France) F Bernabé	21	21

Third Round
(Romania) D A Dehelean	15	21	14
14	(Japan) T Yamamoto	21	18	21
(Belgium) S Verbruggen	10	12
5	(France) F Bernabé	21	21

Fourth Round
14	(Japan) T Yamamoto	12	21	16
5	(France) F Bernabé	21	19	21

==== Section 6 ====
First Round
(Germany) R Theisinger	21	21
(Sweden) M Gustafsson	16	18

Second Round
(Germany) R Theisinger	21	21
(Poland) B Drozdowicz	10	10
(India) J Xavier	16	14
10	(Austria) J Koch	21	21
(Switzerland) P Fuchser	13	5
(Finland) J Rantanen	21	21
(Norway) T Jacobsen	7	7
4	(Denmark) C Loesch	21	21

Third Round
(Germany) R Theisinger	5	8
10	(Austria) J Koch	21	21
(Finland) J Rantanen	10	4
4	(Denmark) C Loesch	21	21

Fourth Round
10	(Austria) J Koch	21	21
4	(Denmark) C Loesch	15	12

==== Section 7 ====
First Round
(Finland) T Smolander	21	21
(Switzerland) S Votta	7	3

Second Round
(Finland) T Smolander	21	22
(Poland) K Grabek	16	20
(Austria) R Hechenberger	12	14
16	(Germany) A Schlüter	21	21
(Norway) V Næss	7	9
(Sweden) M Hagberg	21	21
(Russia) K Manuylov	6	6
7	(Indonesia) D Gunawi	21	21

Third Round
(Finland) T Smolander	18	16
16	(Germany) A Schlüter	21	21
(Sweden) M Hagberg	18	21	9
7	(Indonesia) D Gunawi	21	17	21

Fourth Round
16	(Germany) A Schlüter	11	12
7	(Indonesia) D Gunawi	21	21

==== Section 8 ====
First Round

Second Round
(England) J A. Babington	16	21	21
(Czech Republic) R Gregor	21	5	8
(Denmark) M Aarup	16	10
13	(India) V Sharma	21	21
(Spain) R Jareño	5	10
(France) D Debue	21	21
(Japan) T Matsuoka	10	17
2	(Portugal) F Silva	21	21

Third Round
(England) J A. Babington	21	21
13	(India) V Sharma	17	8
(France) D Debue	13	11
2	(Portugal) F Silva	21	21

Fourth Round
(England) J A. Babington	12	8
2	(Portugal) F Silva	21	21

== Women's singles ==
=== Seeds ===
1. (Japan) Atsuko Matsuguma (second round)
2. (Bulgaria) Reni Hassan (quarterfinals)
3. (Germany) Michaela Meyer (quarterfinals)
4. (Sweden) Nilofar Mosavar Rahmani (second round)

=== Finals ===
Semifinals
(Netherlands) Georgy Van Soerland-Trouerbach	21	21
(Netherlands) Marielle van der Woerdt	11	14
(Iceland) Elsa Nielsen	19	14
(Denmark) Pernille Strøm	21	21

Final
(Netherlands) Georgy Van Soerland-Trouerbach	21	21
(Denmark) Pernille Strøm	10	10

=== Top half ===
==== Section 1 ====
First Round
(Russia) N Gonchar	21	21
(France) S Thomas	19	11
(Germany) C Pretzsch	21	21
(Sweden) E M Lindqvist	7	12
(India) S Gadhili	4	6
(Netherlands) G Van Soerland-Trouerbach	21	21

Second Round
1	(Japan) A Matsuguma	19	10
(Russia) N Gonchar	21	21
(Germany) C Pretzsch	5	9
(Netherlands) G Van Soerland-Trouerbach	21	21

Quarterfinals
(Russia) N Gonchar	9	17
(Netherlands) G Van Soerland-Trouerbach	21	21

==== Section 2 ====
First Round
4	(Sweden) N Mosavar Rahmani	21	16	21
(Germany) M Hukriede	12	21	19
(Denmark) C Boesen	21	21
(Israel) Y Shramkova	7	5
(Netherlands) M van der Woerdt	21	21
(India) S K Nair	10	4
(France) N Martin	16	13
(Spain) M J Almagro	21	21

Second Round
4	(Sweden) N Mosavar Rahmani	13	16
(Denmark) C Boesen	21	21
(Netherlands) M van der Woerdt	18	21	21
(Spain) M J Almagro	21	9	10

Quarterfinals
(Denmark) C Boesen	13	19
(Netherlands) M van der Woerdt	21	21

=== Bottom half ===
==== Section 3 ====
First Round
(Iceland) E Nielsen	21	21
(India) D Mehta	4	2
(France) S Le Pimpec	12	17
(Sweden) M Jonsson	21	21
(Israel) H Torbilo	5	8
(Russia) E Ekaterininskaia	21	21
(Switzerland) D Fahrni	21	10	17
3	(Germany) M Meyer	15	21	21

Second Round
(Iceland) E Nielsen	21	21
(Sweden) M Jonsson	13	13
(Russia) E Ekaterininskaia	16	13
3	(Germany) M Meyer	21	21

Quarterfinals
(Iceland) E Nielsen	21	21
3	(Germany) M Meyer	10	13

==== Section 4 ====
First Round
(Denmark) P Strøm	21	21
(Sweden) U Jark	5	11
(Russia) K Menkova	21	21
(Netherlands) S Komala	14	11
(England) E Austin	21	21
(India) U S Peddisetty	14	7
(Germany) P Schlüter	17	22	7
2	(Bulgaria) R Hassan	21	20	21

Second Round
(Denmark) P Strøm	21	21
(Russia) K Menkova	12	11
(England) E Austin	15	11
2	(Bulgaria) R Hassan	21	21

Quarterfinals
(Denmark) P Strøm	21	21
2	(Bulgaria) R Hassan	7	15

== Men's doubles ==
=== Seeds ===
1. (Indonesia) Hariyanto Arbi / Tri Kusharjanto (champions, gold medal)
2. (Denmark) Peter Rasmussen / Thomas Stavngaard (final, silver medal)
3. (England) Carl Jennings / Mark King (semifinals, bronze medal)
4. (Indonesia) Dharma Gunawi / (Austria) Jürgen Koch (semifinals, bronze medal)
5. (Denmark) Jens Eriksen / Gregers Schytt (quarterfinals)
6. (Sweden) Martin Hagberg / Erik Sjöstedt (quarterfinals)
7. (Thailand) Wittaya Panomchai / Naruthum Surakkhaka (second round)
8. (Spain) Mario Carulla / (Portugal) Fernando Silva (withdrew)

=== Finals ===
Semifinals
1	(Indonesia) Hariyanto Arbi (Indonesia) Tri Kusharjanto	21	22
4	(Indonesia) Dharma Gunawi (Austria) Jürgen Koch	11	20
3	(England) Carl Jennings (England) Mark King	8	10
2	(Denmark) Peter Rasmussen (Denmark) Thomas Stavngaard	21	21

Final
1	(Indonesia) Hariyanto Arbi (Indonesia) Tri Kusharjanto	21	21
2	(Denmark) Peter Rasmussen (Denmark) Thomas Stavngaard	19	17

=== Top half ===
==== Section 1 ====
First Round
(Nepal) S Puspa (Nepal) S Shrestha
(Russia) A Antipov (Russia) A Vasilyev	w	/	o
(Finland) M Björkstén (Finland) T Smolander	24	12	21
(India) R K Gattupalli (India) M V R Meka	22	21	13
(Poland) K Gontarski (Poland) J Szałapski	22	21	19
(Norway) T Jacobsen (Norway) G Olsen	24	17	21
(Austria) T El-Dabbagh (Austria) R Hechenberger	11	13
(England) S Gilhooly (England) M Hawksworth	21	21
(Spain) E J Garcia (Spain) J C Padilla	5	13
(Sweden) M Nilsson (Sweden) J Nordgren	21	21

Second Round
1	(Indonesia) H Arbi (Indonesia) T Kusharjanto	21	21
(Russia) A Antipov (Russia) A Vasilyev	19	10
(Germany) A Schlüter (Germany) B Schneider	21	21
(Finland) M Björkstén (Finland) T Smolander	14	13
5	(Denmark) J Eriksen (Denmark) G Schytt	21	21
(Norway) T Jacobsen (Norway) G Olsen	9	6
(England) S Gilhooly (England) M Hawksworth	18	19
(Sweden) M Nilsson (Sweden) J Nordgren	21	21

Third Round
1	(Indonesia) H Arbi (Indonesia) T Kusharjanto	21	21
(Germany) A Schlüter (Germany) B Schneider	15	16
5	(Denmark) J Eriksen (Denmark) G Schytt	21	21
(Sweden) M Nilsson (Sweden) J Nordgren	14	13

Quarterfinals
1	(Indonesia) H Arbi (Indonesia) T Kusharjanto	21	18	21
5	(Denmark) J Eriksen (Denmark) G Schytt	14	21	18

==== Section 2 ====
First Round
(Thailand) N Sroidokson (Thailand) S Wiriyachaikeg	21	21
(Russia) O Nikiforov (Russia) K Skorobogatov	10	8
(Czech Republic) R Gregor (Czech Republic) M Koudelka	15	18
(France) R Didier (France) A Poitevin	21	21
(India) S Bhattacharjee (India) H K Sengupta	21	21
(Austria) H Hochgatterer (Germany) R Kleine	19	19
(Sweden) J Andersson (Sweden) U Svensson	21	21
(Poland) R Bogdanski (Poland) K Grabek	9	6
(England) J A. Babington (England) P J. Sunderland	21	21
(Japan) K Hamaji (Japan) T Yamamoto	9	15

Second Round
4	(Indonesia) D Gunawi (Austria) J Koch	21	21
(Thailand) N Sroidokson (Thailand) S Wiriyachaikeg	12	11
(Denmark) M Aarup (Denmark) C Loesch	21	21
(France) R Didier (France) A Poitevin	10	15
8	(Spain) M Carulla (Portugal) F Silva
(India) S Bhattacharjee (India) H K Sengupta	w	/	o
(Sweden) J Andersson (Sweden) U Svensson	21	13	19
(England) J A. Babington (England) P J. Sunderland	17	21	21

Third Round
4	(Indonesia) D Gunawi (Austria) J Koch	21	21
(Denmark) M Aarup (Denmark) C Loesch	14	14
(India) S Bhattacharjee (India) H K Sengupta	19	20
(England) J A. Babington (England) P J. Sunderland	22	21

Quarterfinals
4	(Indonesia) D Gunawi (Austria) J Koch	21	21
(England) J A. Babington (England) P J. Sunderland	10	15

=== Bottom half ===
==== Section 3 ====
First Round
(Germany) M Bujak (Norway) T-G Morskogen	21	21
(Norway) Ø Eepedal Larsen (Netherlands) R Otto	18	13
(India) V Rallan (India) N Singh	16	16
(Denmark) B T J Jensen (Denmark) A Steenkjær	21	21
(Switzerland) P Gaudin (Switzerland) G Locher	4	12
(Germany) M Götze (Germany) R Theisinger	21	21
(Poland) A Śmierzchalski (Poland) R Śmierzchalski	9	8
(Russia) K Manuylov (Russia) S Melnikov	21	21
(Japan) K Okubo (Japan) K Suzuki	21	21
(Sweden) J Gate (Sweden) C Wiklander	16	18

Second Round
(Germany) M Bujak (Norway) T-G Morskogen	19	13
(Denmark) B T J Jensen (Denmark) A Steenkjær	21	21
(Germany) M Götze (Germany) R Theisinger	21	13	21
7	(Thailand) W Panomchai (Thailand) N Surakkhaka	15	21	18
(Russia) K Manuylov (Russia) S Melnikov	21	21
(Finland) K Hellman (Finland) J Rantanen	10	7
(Japan) K Okubo (Japan) K Suzuki	10	9
3	(England) C Jennings (England) M King	21	21

Third Round
(Denmark) B T J Jensen (Denmark) A Steenkjær	21	18	21
(Germany) M Göze (Germany) R Theisinger	13	21	18
(Russia) K Manuylov (Russia) S Melnikov	8	13
3	(England) C Jennings (England) M King	21	21

Quarterfinals
(Denmark) B T J Jensen (Denmark) A Steenkjær	22	20
3	(England) C Jennings (England) M King	24	22

==== Section 4 ====
First Round
(Poland) B Drozdowicz (Poland) J Orzol	9	5
(India) T Chauhan (India) A Pathan	21	21
(Germany) A Wiechmann (Germany) J Zepmeisel	21	21
(Japan) G Egashira (Japan) T Matsuoka	10	17
(France) O Aymard (France) J-F Massias	10	21	21
(Russia) I Ivanov (Russia) S Makin	21	17	16
(Finland) J Jalkanen (Norway) V Næss	21	13	22
(Lithuania) S Butkus (Lithuania) A Kepežinskas	19	21	20
(England) R Bagga (England) P Mitchell	w	/	o
(China) Zhang J (China) Zhao DQ

Second Round
(India) T Chauhan (India) A Pathan	19	14
(Germany) A Wiechmann (Germany) J Zepmeisel	21	21
(France) O Aymard (France) J-F Massias	6	11
6	(Sweden) M Hagberg (Sweden) E Sjöstedt	21	21
(Finland) J Jalkanen (Norway) V Næss	21	21
(Finland) M Franssila (Finland) M Järnström	16	9
(England) R Bagga (England) P Mitchell	15	16
2	(Denmark) P Rasmussen (Denmark) T Stavngaard	21	21

Third Round
(Germany) A Wiechmann (Germany) J Zepmeisel	22	19	13
6	(Sweden) M Hagberg (Sweden) E Sjöstedt	20	21	21
(Finland) J Jalkanen (Norway) V Næss	6	13
2	(Denmark) P Rasmussen (Denmark) T Stavngaard	21	21

Quarterfinals
6	(Sweden) M Hagberg (Sweden) E Sjöstedt	18	10
2	(Denmark) P Rasmussen (Denmark) T Stavngaard	21	21

== Women's doubles ==
=== Seeds ===
1. (England) Tracey Middleton / Joanne Muggeridge (semifinals, bronze medal)
2. (Hungary) Gondáné Fórián Csilla / (Bulgaria) Reni Hassan (final, silver medal)
3. (England) Olga Bryant / Karina Bye (third round)
4. (Netherlands) Marielle van der Woerdt / Georgy Van Soerland-Trouerbach (quarterfinals)
5. (Poland) Dorota Danielak / Dorota Grzejdak (quarterfinals)
6. (Germany) Michael Hukriede / Stefanie Ruberg (semifinals, bronze medal)
7. (Denmark) Anna Larsen / Marianne Simon (quarterfinals)
8. (Denmark) Christina Rindshøj / Dorte Steenberg (second round)

=== Finals ===
Semifinals
1	(England) Tracey Middleton (England) Joanne Muggeridge	21	18	15
(Russia) Natalja Gonchar (Russia) Olga Kuznetsova	14	21	21
6	(Germany) Michaela Hukriede (Germany) Stefanie Ruberg	19	21	13
2	(Hungary) Gondáné Fórián Csilla (Bulgaria) Reni Hassan	21	17	21

Final
(Russia) Natalja Gonchar (Russia) Olga Kuznetsova	21	21
2	(Hungary) Gondáné Fórián Csilla (Bulgaria) Reni Hassan	16	15

=== Top half ===
==== Section 1 ====
First Round

Second Round
1	(England) T Middleton (England) J Muggeridge	21	21
(Sweden) E M Lindqvist (Sweden) P Stahle	7	10
(India) L Khiangte (India) V Tochhawng
(Russia) E Ekaterininskaia (Netherlands) F Selles	w	/	o
5	(Poland) D Danielak (Poland) D Grzejdak	21	21
(Israel) Y Shramkova (Israel) H Torbilo	9	14
(Norway) T Gulbrandsen (Norway) H Parnemann	11	19
(Germany) C Paulsen (Germany) P Schülter	21	21

Third Round
1	(England) T Middleton (England) J Muggeridge	21	21
(Russia) E Ekaterininskaia (Netherlands) F Selles	15	7
5	(Poland) D Danielak (Poland) D Grzejdak	21	19	21
(Germany) C Paulsen (Germany) P Schülter	15	21	13

Quarterfinals
1	(England) T Middleton (England) J Muggeridge	21	21
5	(Poland) D Danielak (Poland) D Grzejdak	14	12

==== Section 2 ====
First Round
(Sweden) U Jark (Sweden) M Jansson	7	12
(Russia) N Gonchar (Russia) O Kuznetsova	21	21

Second Round
4	(Netherlands) M van der Woerdt (Netherlands) G Van Soerland-Trouerbach	21	21
(Republic of Ireland) S Campion (Republic of Ireland) S Grehan	11	2
(England) S Foster (England) S Hall	21	21
(India) S Devgun (India) A Parmar	16	13
8	(Denmark) C Rindshøj (Denmark) D Steenberg	19	21	27
(Germany) M Meyer (Germany) C Pretzsch	21	17	25
(Switzerland) B Molyneaux (Switzerland) F Striebel	9	15
(Russia) N Gonchar (Russia) O Kuznetsova	21	21

Third Round
4	(Netherlands) M van der Woerdt (Netherlands) G Van Soerland-Trouerbach	21	21
(England) S Foster (England) S Hall	8	12
8	(Denmark) C Rindshøj (Denmark) D Steenberg	19	18
(Russia) N Gonchar (Russia) O Kuznetsova	21	21

Quarterfinals
4	(Netherlands) M van der Woerdt (Netherlands) G Van Soerland-Trouerbach	21	18	23
(Russia) N Gonchar (Russia) O Kuznetsova	14	21	25

=== Bottom half ===
==== Section 3 ====
First Round
(Denmark) H Blomsterberg (Denmark) B Pedersen	21	20	21
(Lithuania) A Gabrenaite Sundell (Lithuania) J Preveliene	13	22	14

Second Round
(Denmark) H Blomsterberg (Denmark) B Pedersen	21	21
(India) S Gadhill (India) R Sharma	15	17
(Sweden) A Lindgren (Sweden) E Widberg	8	8
6	(Germany) M Hukriede (Germany) S Ruberg	21	21
(France) H Bretillon (France) S Thomas
(Sweden) N Mosavar Rahmani (Denmark) P Strøm	w	/	o
(China) Ouyang LM (China) Tan W
3	(England) O Bryant (England) K Bye	w	/	o

Third Round
(Denmark) H Blomsterberg (Denmark) B Pedersen	17	9
6	(Germany) M Hukriede (Germany) S Ruberg	21	21
(Sweden) N Mosavar Rahmani (Denmark) P Strøm	21	21
3	(England) O Bryant (England) K Bye	16	13

Quarterfinals
6	(Germany) M Hukriede (Germany) S Ruberg	21	21
(Sweden) N Mosavar Rahmani (Denmark) P Strøm	18	18

==== Section 4 ====
First Round

Second Round
(India) K Srinivasan (India) J Tessy	17	10
(Germany) A Dietz (Germany) E Vonmetz	21	21
(Netherlands) S Komala (Netherlands) T Paap-Keijner	9	9
7	(Denmark) A Larsen (Denmark) M Simon	21	21
(Switzerland) D Fahrni (Switzerland) S Suhr	19	21	17
(Spain) M J Almagro (France) S Le Pimpec	21	16	21
(England) N Robertson (England) P Wilkes	6	13
2	(Hungary) Gondáné Fórián C (Bulgaria) R Hassan	21	21

Third Round
(Germany) A Dietz (Germany) E Vonmetz	12	13
7	(Denmark) A Larsen (Denmark) M Simon	21	21
(Spain) M J Almagro (France) S Le Pimpec	17	3
2	(Hungary) Gondáné Fórián C (Bulgaria) R Hassan	21	21

Quarterfinals
7	(Denmark) A Larsen (Denmark) M Simon	13	10
2	(Hungary) Gondáné Fórián C (Bulgaria) R Hassan	21	21

== Mixed doubles ==
=== Seeds ===
1. (England) Paul Mitchell / Karina Bye (second round)
2. (Japan) Kei Hamaji / Mie Hanyu (quarterfinals)
3. (England) Daniel Plant / Tracey Middleton (quarterfinals)
4. (Sweden) Erik Sjöstedt / Nilofar Mosavar Rahmani (final, silver medal)
5. (Denmark) Carsten Loesch / Dorte Steenberg (champions, gold medal)
6. (Germany) Jochen Zepmeisel / Tanja Eberl (second round)
7. (England) Carl Jennings / Joanne Muggeridge (semifinals, bronze medal)
8. (India) Raja Kumar Gattupalli / Usha Sree Peddisetty (second round)

=== Finals ===
Semifinals
(Russia) Vadim Nazarov (Russia) Olga Kuznetsova	19	19
4	(Sweden) Erik Sjöstedt (Sweden) Nilofar Mosavar Rahmani	21	21
5	(Denmark) Carsten Loesch (Denmark) Dorte Steenberg	13	21	21
7	(England) Carl Jennings (England) Joanne Muggeridge	21	18	18

Final
4	(Sweden) Erik Sjöstedt (Sweden) Nilofar Mosavar Rahmani	17	13
5	(Denmark) Carsten Loesch (Denmark) Dorte Steenberg	21	21

=== Top half ===
==== Section 1 ====
First Round
(Lithuania) A Kepežinskas (Lithuania) J Preveliene	6	21	15
SUB	(France) A Poitevin (France) S Le Pompec	21	15	21
(India) D S Patwardhan (India) D N Joshi	9	8
(Sweden) C Wiklander (Sweden) M Karstrom	21	21
(Norway) T-G Morskogen (Norway) B Thyness	13	9
(Denmark) M Drescher (Denmark) C Rindshøj	21	21

Second Round
1	(England) P Mitchell (England) K Bye	18	19
(Russia) V Nazarov (Russia) O Kuznetsova	21	21
(Netherlands) R Otto (Republic of Ireland) S Grehan	21	21
SUB	(France) A Poitevin (France) S Le Pompec	18	9
6	(Germany) J Zepmeisel (Germany) T Eberl	20	15
(Sweden) C Wiklander (Sweden) M Karstrom	22	21
(Poland) K Pik (Poland) E Bracha	11	10
(Denmark) M Drescher (Denmark) C Rindshøj	21	21

Third Round
(Russia) V Nazarov (Russia) O Kuznetsova	21	21
(Netherlands) R Otto (Republic of Ireland) S Grehan	14	10
(Sweden) C Wiklander (Sweden) M Karstrom	16	11
(Denmark) M Drescher (Denmark) C Rindshøj	21	21

Quarterfinals
(Russia) V Nazarov (Russia) O Kuznetsova	21	21
(Denmark) M Drescher (Denmark) C Rindshøj	15	15

==== Section 2 ====
First Round
(England) S Hulbert (England) O Bryant	21	21
(Poland) J Szałapski (Poland) A Białasiewicz	9	17
(Netherlands) A Regtien (Netherlands) M van der Woerdt	w	/	o
(China) Zhang J (China) Ouyang LM
(Norway) G Olsen (Russia) E Ekaterininskaia	12	15
(Germany) A Wiechmann (Germany) E Vonmetz	21	21

Second Round
4	(Sweden) E Sjöstedt (Sweden) N Mosavar Rahmani	w	/	o
(France) T Popov (France) R Anand-Monrocq
(Switzerland) P Fuchser (Switzerland) S Suhr	14	9
(England) S Hulbert (England) O Bryant	21	21
8	(India) R K Gattupalli (India) U S Peddisetty	11	12
(Netherlands) A Regtien (Netherlands) M van der Woerdt	21	21
(Denmark) M Aarup (Denmark) H Meincke	13	14
(Germany) A Wiechmann (Germany) E Vonmetz	21	21

Third Round
4	(Sweden) E Sjöstedt (Sweden) N Mosavar Rahmani	21	21
(England) S Hulbert (England) O Bryant	5	12
(Netherlands) A Regtien (Netherlands) M van der Woerdt	21	23	19
(Germany) A Wiechmann (Germany) E Vonmetz	19	25	21

Quarterfinals
4	(Sweden) E Sjöstedt (Sweden) N Mosavar Rahmani	21	21
(Germany) A Wiechmann (Germany) E Vonmetz	14	13

=== Bottom half ===
==== Section 3 ====
First Round
(Sweden) P J Baeza (Sweden) A Lindgren	17	11
(France) O Aymard (France) N Martin	21	21
(Austria) W Kammel (Austria) C Fischer	16	21	21
(Switzerland) G Locher (Switzerland) B Molyneaux	21	11	23
(Israel) V Torbilo (Israel) H Torbilo	11	13
(Russia) A Antipov (Russia) S Alferova	21	21

Second Round
(France) O Aymard (France) N Martin	11	17
(Germany) R Kleine (Germany) S Ruberg	21	21
(Switzerland) G Locher (Switzerland) B Molyneaux	9	8
5	(Denmark) C Loesch (Denmark) D Steenberg	21	21
(Russia) A Antipov (Russia) S Alferova	21	21
(Japan) K Suzuki (India) D Mehta	6	8
(Poland) K Gontarski (Poland) D Danielak	15	17
3	(England) D Plant (England) T Middleton	21	21

Third Round
(Germany) R Kleine (Germany) S Ruberg	12	19
5	(Denmark) C Loesch (Denmark) D Steenberg	21	21
(Russia) A Antipov (Russia) S Alferova	17	11
3	(England) D Plant (England) T Middleton	21	21

Quarterfinals
5	(Denmark) C Loesch (Denmark) D Steenberg	21	21
3	(England) D Plant (England) T Middleton	15	19

==== Section 4 ====
First Round
(France) F Bernabé (France) H Bretillon	21	21
(Russia) S Melnikov (Lithuania) A Gabrenaite Sundell	17	15
(Sweden) M Nilsson (Sweden) D Harfman Bromee	21	21
(Switzerland) E Ritter (Switzerland) D Fahrni	14	9
(Germany) B Schneider (Germany) C Paulsen	w	/	o
(China) Zhao DQ (China) Tian W

Second Round
(France) F Bernabé (France) H Bretillon	21	21
(India) S Bakshi (India) S Devgun	19	16
(Sweden) M Nilsson (Sweden) D Harfman Bromee	17	14
7	(England) C Jennings (England) J Muggeridge	21	21
(Germany) B Schneider (Germany) C Paulsen	18	19
(Russia) A Vasilyev (Russia) N Gonchar	21	21
SUB	(Denmark) H Lykke (Denmark) D K Larsen	13	12
2	(Japan) K Hamaji (Japan) M Hanyu	21	21

Third Round
(France) F Bernabé (France) H Bretillon	19	16
7	(England) C Jennings (England) J Muggeridge	21	21
(Russia) A Vasilyev (Russia) N Gonchar	19	8
2	(Japan) K Hamaji (Japan) M Hanyu	21	21

Quarterfinals
7	(England) C Jennings (England) J Muggeridge	21	21
2	(Japan) K Hamaji (Japan) M Hanyu	18	12
