= Sarah Hardaker =

English badminton player

Personal information
- Born: Sarah Louise Hardaker; 1 December 1975 (age 50) Dartford, Kent, England
- Height: 1.82 m (6 ft 0 in)
- Weight: 68 kg (150 lb)

Sport
- Country: England
- Sport: Badminton
- Event: Women's singles & doubles

Women's singles & doubles
- BWF profile
Medal record
Women's badminton
Representing England
European Junior Championships
| Bronze medal – third place | 1993 Sofia | Mixed doubles |

Sarah Louise Hardaker (born 1 December 1975) is a former English professional badminton player. She has been capped 31 times for England. Hardaker who came from Kent and attended Gravesend Grammar School for Girls between 1987 and 1994, won the mixed doubles title at the English national junior championships in 1992/93 season partnered with Lee Boosey, and also the girls' doubles event in 1993/94 season partnered with Rebecca Pantaney. She and Boosey were the bronze medallists at the 1993 European Junior Championships in Sofia, Bulgaria. Hardaker competed at the World Championships in three consecutive years in 1997 Glasgow, 1999 Copenhagen, and 2001 Seville. She represented Great Britain at the 2000 Summer Olympics in Sydney, Australia. Hardaker completing her undergraduate degree in sport science, and work at the Nuffield physiotherapist. Before joining Nuffield, she used to work for the National Health Service at Barnet & Chase hospital whilst also being the club physio for Tabard RFC in Herts.

== Achievements ==
=== European Junior Championships ===
Mixed doubles

| Year | Venue | Partner | Opponent | Score | Result |
|---|---|---|---|---|---|
| 1993 | Hristo Botev Hall, Sofia, Bulgaria | (England) Lee Boosey | (Denmark) Thomas Stavngaard (Denmark) Sara Runesten | 10–15, 6–15 | Bronze |

=== IBF World Grand Prix ===
The World Badminton Grand Prix sanctioned by International Badminton Federation (IBF) since 1983.

Women's doubles

| Year | Tournament | Partner | Opponent | Score | Result |
|---|---|---|---|---|---|
| 1995 | Scottish Open | (England) Emma Constable | (Sweden) Catrine Bengtsson (Sweden) Maria Bengtsson | 7–15, 5–15 | (silver) Runner-up |

=== IBF International ===
Women's singles

| Year | Tournament | Opponent | Score | Result |
|---|---|---|---|---|
| 1995 | Bermuda International | (Trinidad and Tobago) Debra O’Connor | 11–1, 11–6 | (gold) Winner |

Women's doubles

| Year | Tournament | Partner | Opponent | Score | Result |
|---|---|---|---|---|---|
| 2001 | Spanish International | (England) Emma Constable | (England) Ella Miles (England) Sara Sankey | 15–13, 15–12 | (gold) Winner |
| 2000 | Irish International | (England) Emma Constable | (England) Felicity Gallup (England) Joanne Muggeridge | 15–3, 12–15, 17–16 | (gold) Winner |
| 2000 | Canadian International | (England) Joanne Davies | (Japan) Naomi Murakami (Japan) Hiromi Yamada | 3–15, 17–15, 15–8 | (gold) Winner |
| 2000 | Portugal International | (England) Joanne Davies | (Denmark) Lene Mørk (Denmark) Britta Andersen | 12–15, 12–15 | (silver) Runner-up |
| 1998 | Portugal International | (England) Tracy Dineen | (England) Lorraine Cole (England) Rebecca Pantaney | 15–3, 7–15, 15–10 | (gold) Winner |
| 1997 | La Chaux-de-Fonds International | (England) Emma Constable | (Netherlands) Monique Hoogland (Netherlands) Nicole van Hooren | 12–15, 12–15 | (silver) Runner-up |
| 1996 | Welsh International | (Wales) Kelly Morgan | (Netherlands) Brenda Conijn (Netherlands) Nicole van Hooren | 15–6, 10–15, 4–15 | (silver) Runner-up |
| 1996 | La Chaux-de-Fonds International | (England) Emma Constable | (Netherlands) Brenda Conijn (Netherlands) Nicole van Hooren | 6–15, 11–15 | (silver) Runner-up |
| 1995 | Bermuda International | (England) Yvonne Fox | (United States) Linda French (United States) Erika Von Heiland | 17–15, 18–14 | (gold) Winner |
| 1994 | Hungarian International | (England) Rebecca Pantaney | (Wales) Kelly Morgan (Denmark) Anne Søndergaard | 15–8, 15–11 | (gold) Winner |

Mixed doubles

| Year | Tournament | Partner | Opponent | Score | Result |
|---|---|---|---|---|---|
| 2000 | Irish International | (England) Graham Hurrell | (Scotland) Russell Hogg (Scotland) Kirsteen McEwan | 9–15, 8–15 | (silver) Runner-up |
| 1998 | Portugal International | (England) James Anderson | (Canada) Iain Sydie (Canada) Denyse Julien | 0–15, 7–15 | (silver) Runner-up |
| 1997 | French International | (England) Peter Jeffrey | (Scotland) Kenny Middlemiss (Scotland) Elinor Middlemiss | 15–8, 15–11 | (gold) Winner |
| 1997 | La Chaux-de-Fonds International | (England) Nathan Robertson | (Ukraine) Vladislav Druzchenko (Russia) Marina Yakusheva | 9–15, 15–3, 10–15 | (silver) Runner-up |
| 1995 | Bermuda International | (England) Steve Isaac | (Peru) Mario Carulla (United States) Linda French | 15–7, 15–6 | (gold) Winner |
| 1994 | Hungarian International | (England) Ian Pearson | (Germany) Kai Mitteldorf (Germany) Nicol Pitro | 15–10, 15–4 | (gold) Winner |
| 1993 | Irish International | (England) Julian Robertson | (England) Simon Archer (England) Joanne Davies | 5–15, 10–15 | (silver) Runner-up |
