= 1993 European Junior Badminton Championships =

Badminton championships

Tournament details
- Dates: 11 – 17 April 1993
- Edition: 13th
- Venue: Hristo Botev Hall
- Location: Sofia, Bulgaria

The 1993 European Junior Badminton Championships was the 13th tournament of the European Junior Badminton Championships. It was held in Sofia, Bulgaria, in the month of April. Danish players swept all the titles home, the singles, the doubles and mixed team championships as well.

== Medalists ==
Discipline	Gold	Silver	Bronze
Boys' singles	(Denmark) Jim Laugesen	(Sweden) Rasmus Wengberg	(Sweden) Daniel Eriksson
Boys' singles	(Denmark) Jim Laugesen	(Sweden) Rasmus Wengberg	(England) Steve Isaac
Girls' singles	(Denmark) Mette Sørensen	(Russia) Marina Andrievskaya	(Denmark) Lone Sørensen
Girls' singles	(Denmark) Mette Sørensen	(Russia) Marina Andrievskaya	(Denmark) Rikke Olsen
Boys' doubles	(Denmark) Jim Laugesen (Denmark) Janek Roos	(Denmark) Thomas Søgaard (Denmark) Thomas Stavngaard	(England) Richard Doling (England) Roger Mistry
Boys' doubles	(Denmark) Jim Laugesen (Denmark) Janek Roos	(Denmark) Thomas Søgaard (Denmark) Thomas Stavngaard	(Sweden) Daniel Eriksson (Sweden) Rasmus Wengberg
Girls' doubles	(Denmark) Mette Sørensen (Denmark) Rikke Olsen	(Denmark) Lone Sørensen (Denmark) Sara Runesten	(Germany) Nicole Grether (Germany) Sandra Beißel
Girls' doubles	(Denmark) Mette Sørensen (Denmark) Rikke Olsen	(Denmark) Lone Sørensen (Denmark) Sara Runesten	(Russia) Ekaterina Karhushina (Russia) Marina Kurochkina
Mixed doubles	(Denmark) Thomas Stavngaard (Denmark) Sara Runesten	(Sweden) Johan Tholinsson (Sweden) Pernilla Carlsson	(Belgium) Rolf Monteneiro (Belgium) Manon Albinus
Mixed doubles	(Denmark) Thomas Stavngaard (Denmark) Sara Runesten	(Sweden) Johan Tholinsson (Sweden) Pernilla Carlsson	(England) Lee Boosey (England) Sara Hardaker
Mixed team	Denmark; Jim Laugesen; Janek Roos; Thomas Søgaard; Thomas Stavngaard; Rikke Olsen; Sara Runesten; Lone Sørensen; Mette Sørensen	Sweden; Daniel Eriksson; Anders Hornlund; Johan Tholinsson; Rasmus Wengberg; Pernilla Carlsson; Johanna Holgersson; Kristin Nilsson; Pernilla Petterson	Russia; Arthur Hachaturian; Evgeniy Kovalenko; Evgeniy Nazarenko; Marina Andrievskaya; Ekaterina Karhushina; Marina Kurochkina

== Results ==
=== Semi-finals ===
Category	Winner	Runner-up	Score
Boys' singles	(Sweden) Rasmus Wengberg	(England) Steve Issac	15–3, 15–3
Boys' singles	(Denmark) Jim Laugesen	(Sweden) Daniel Ericsson	15–3, 15–8
Girls' singles	(Denmark) Mette Sørensen	(Denmark) Rikke Olsen	11–0, 11–4
Girls' singles	(Russia) Marina Andrievskaya	(Denmark) Lone Sørensen	11–8, 6–11, 11–6
Boys' doubles	(Denmark) Janek Roos (Denmark) Jim Laugesen	(England) Richard Doling (England) Roger Mistry	15–8, 15–12
Boys' doubles	(Denmark) Thomas Søgaard (Denmark) Thomas Stavngaard	(Sweden) Daniel Ericsson (Sweden) Rasmus Wengberg	15–8, 10–15, 15–11
Girls' doubles	(Denmark) Mette Sørensen (Denmark) Rikke Olsen	(Germany) Nicole Grether (Germany) Sandra Beißel	15–3, 15–7
Girls' doubles	(Denmark) Lone Sørensen (Denmark) Sara Runesten	(Russia) Ekaterina Karhushina (Russia) Maria Kurochkina	15–6, 15–5
Mixed doubles	(Sweden) Johan Tholinsson (Sweden) Pernilla Carlsson	(Belgium) Rolf Monteneiro (Belgium) Manon Albinus	18–15, 4–15, 17–16
Mixed doubles	(Denmark) Thomas Stavngaard (Denmark) Sara Runesten	(England) Lee Boosey (England) Sara Hardaker	15–11, 15–6

=== Finals ===
Category	Winners	Runners-up	Score
Boys' singles	(Denmark) Jim Laugesen	(Sweden) Rasmus Wengberg	15–9, 15–10
Girls' singles	(Denmark) Mette Sørensen	(Russia) Marina Andrievskaya	11–8, 11–3
Boys' doubles	(Denmark) Janek Roos (Denmark) Jim Laugesen	(Denmark) Thomas Søgaard (Denmark) Thomas Stavngaard	15–12, 15–9
Girls' doubles	(Denmark) Mette Sørensen (Denmark) Rikke Olsen	(Denmark) Lone Sørensen (Denmark) Sara Runesten	15–10, 15–5
Mixed doubles	(Denmark) Thomas Stavngaard (Denmark) Sara Runesten	(Sweden) Johan Tholinsson (Sweden) Pernilla Carlsson	15–8, 15–8

== Medal table ==
Rank	Nation	Gold	Silver	Bronze	Total
1	Denmark (DEN)	6	2	2	10
2	Sweden (SWE)	0	3	2	5
3	Russia (RUS)	0	1	2	3
4	England (ENG)	0	0	3	3
5	Belgium (BEL)	0	0	1	1
5	Germany (GER)	0	0	1	1
Totals (6 entries)		6	6	11	23
