= Tian Wei =

Chinese surgeon and professor

- Born: February 1959 (age 67); China
- Education: Peking University; Hirosaki University
- Scientific career
- Fields: Surgery
- Workplaces: Beijing Jishuitan Hospital

Chinese name
- Traditional Chinese: 田偉
- Simplified Chinese: 田伟
Transcriptions
Standard Mandarin
- Hanyu Pinyin: Tián Wěi

Tian Wei (Chinese: 田伟; born February 1959) is a Chinese surgeon and professor and doctoral supervisor at Peking University and Tsinghua University. He is an academician of the Chinese Academy of Engineering and serves as the president and deputy party chief of Beijing Jishuitan Hospital.

== Biography ==
Tian was born in February 1959. After graduating from Peking University Health Science Center in 1983, he became a surgeon at Beijing Jishuitan Hospital. In 1989 he pursued advanced studies in Japan, earning a doctor's degree from Hirosaki University in 1994. Then He carried out postdoctoral research at the university. He returned to China in 1995 and that same year became vice-president of Beijing Jishuitan Hospital. He founded spinal surgery for the hospital and served as its director. Tian Wei, assumed his position in 2003 and served until August 2020, when he resigned.

=== Downfall ===
In mid March 2024, he has come under investigation for "serious violations of laws" by the Central Commission for Discipline Inspection (CCDI), the party's internal disciplinary body, and the National Supervisory Commission, the highest anti-corruption agency of China.

== Honours and awards ==
- October 21, 2016 Science and Technology Progress Award of the Ho Leung Ho Lee Foundation
- September 1, 2017 Honorary Fellow of the Royal College of Surgeons of Edinburgh
- January 14, 2019 Foreign Fellow of the Académie Nationale de Médecine
- November 22, 2019 Member of the Chinese Academy of Engineering (CAE)

Business positions
Preceded by ?	President of Beijing Jishuitan Hospital; 2003–2020	Succeeded by Jiang Xieyuan (蒋协远)
