= Stellan Österberg =

Swedish badminton player

Personal information
- Born: 17 January 1965 (age 61) Landvetter, Sweden
- Height: 1.80 m (5 ft 11 in)

Sport
- Country: Sweden
- Sport: Badminton
- Handedness: Right
- BWF profile
Medal record
Men's badminton
Representing Sweden
European Mixed Team Championships
Gold medal – first place	1992 Glasgow	Mixed team
European Junior Championships
Silver medal – second place	1983 Helsinki	Mixed doubles
Bronze medal – third place	1981 Edinburgh	Mixed team
Bronze medal – third place	1983 Helsinki	Boys' singles
Bronze medal – third place	1983 Helsinki	Mixed team

Stellan Österberg (born 17 January 1965) is a Swedish badminton player. He competed in the men's doubles tournament at the 1992 Summer Olympics.

== Achievements ==
=== European Junior Championships ===
Boys' singles
Year	Venue	Opponent	Score	Result
1983	Helsinkian Sports Hall; Helsinki, Finland	(Denmark) Karsten Schultz	18–15, 10–15, 11–15	Bronze

Mixed doubles
Year	Venue	Partner	Opponent	Score	Result
1983	Helsinkian Sports Hall; Helsinki, Finland	(Sweden) Christine Magnusson	(Denmark) Anders Nielsen (Denmark) Gitte Paulsen	7–15, 12–15	Silver

=== IBF World Grand Prix ===
The World Badminton Grand Prix sanctioned by International Badminton Federation (IBF) from 1983 to 2006.

Men's doubles
Year	Tournament	Partner	Opponent	Score	Result
1991	Swiss Open	(Sweden) Pär-Gunnar Jönsson	(England) Andy Goode (England) Chris Hunt	15–10, 18–14	(gold) Winner
1992	Swiss Open	(Sweden) Jan-Eric Antonsson	(Sweden) Patrik Andreasson (Sweden) Mikael Rosén	15–7, 15–7	(gold) Winner
1993	Swiss Open	(Denmark) Max Gandrup	(Sweden) Peter Axelsson (Sweden) Pär-Gunnar Jönsson	4–15, 4–15	(silver) Runner-up
1995	Scottish Open	(Denmark) Jesper Larsen	(England) Nick Ponting (England) Julian Robertson	5–15, 6–15	(silver) Runner-up

=== IBF International ===
Men's singles
Year	Tournament	Opponent	Score	Result
1987	Norwegian International	(Denmark) Michael Søgaard	8–15, 17–18	(silver) Runner-up

Men's doubles
Year	Tournament	Partner	Opponent	Score	Result
1984	USSR International	(Sweden) Ulf Persson	(Sweden) Jan-Eric Antonsson (Sweden) Pär-Gunnar Jönsson	6–15, 8–15	(silver) Runner-up
1988	Nordic Championships	(Sweden) Jan-Eric Antonsson	(Denmark) Michael Kjeldsen (Denmark) Jens Peter Nierhoff	0–15, 10–15	(silver) Runner-up
1989	Norwegian International	(Sweden) Manfred Mellqvist	(Norway) Erik Lia (Norway) Hans Sperre jr.	2–15, 15–11, 9–15	(silver) Runner-up
1991	Norwegian International	(Sweden) Jan-Eric Antonsson	(Denmark) Christian Jakobsen (Denmark) Martin Lundgaard Hansen	15–6, 15–5	(gold) Winner
1993	Uppsala International	(Denmark) Max Gandrup	(Sweden) Jan-Eric Antonsson (Sweden) Mikael Rosén	9–15, 9–15	(silver) Runner-up
1993	Norwegian International	(Sweden) Christian Ljungmark	(Denmark) Thomas Damgaard (Denmark) Jan Jørgensen	2–15, 0–15	(silver) Runner-up
1994	Norwegian International	(Sweden) Magnus Jansson	(Denmark) Jesper Larsen (United States) Thomas Reidy	15–7, 15–10	(gold) Winner
1995	Malmö International	(Denmark) Jesper Larsen	(Denmark) Janek Roos (Denmark) Thomas Stavngaard	18–16, 5–15, 7–15	(silver) Runner-up
1995	Norwegian International	(Denmark) Jesper Larsen	(Denmark) Jim Laugesen (Denmark) Thomas Stavngaard	15–11, 10–15, 12–15	(silver) Runner-up

Mixed doubles
Year	Tournament	Partner	Opponent	Score	Result
1984	Norwegian International	(Sweden) Catharina Andersson	(Denmark) Kim Brodersen (Denmark) Marian Christiansen	18–17, 6–15, 15–11	(gold) Winner
