= 1998 Thomas & Uber Cup =

Biennial international badminton team championship

1998 Thomas and Uber Cup 1998年湯姆斯盃和尤伯盃

Tournament details
- Dates: 17–24 May 1998
- Edition: 20th (Thomas Cup); 17th (Uber Cup)
- Level: International
- Nations: 8 (Thomas Cup); 8 (Uber Cup)
- Venue: Queen Elizabeth Stadium
- Location: Hong Kong
- Official website: bwfthomasubercups.com

The 1998 Thomas & Uber Cup was the 20th tournament of the Thomas Cup, and the 17th tournament of the Uber Cup, which are the major international team competitions in world badminton.

== Host city selection ==
China was originally selected as the host, with Shanghai as the competition site. IBF later moved the competition to Hong Kong due to sponsorship issues which preferred Hong Kong over Shanghai.

== Qualification ==
Hong Kong qualified automatically as hosts. Indonesia qualified as title holders of the Thomas Cup and the Uber Cup.

=== Thomas Cup ===
Means of qualification	Date	Venue	Slot	Qualified teams
Host country	11 December 1996	Hong Kong	1	Hong Kong
1996 Thomas Cup	16 – 25 May 1996	Hong Kong	1	Indonesia
European Zone	14 – 21 February 1998	Sandefjord	3	Denmark
European Zone	14 – 21 February 1998	Sandefjord	3	Netherlands
European Zone	14 – 21 February 1998	Sandefjord	3	Sweden
Asian Zone	15 – 22 February 1998	Manila	3	China
Asian Zone	15 – 22 February 1998	Manila	3	Malaysia
Asian Zone	15 – 22 February 1998	Manila	3	South Korea
Total			8	

=== Uber Cup ===
Means of qualification	Date	Venue	Slot	Qualified teams
Host country	11 December 1996	Hong Kong	1	Hong Kong
1996 Uber Cup	16 – 25 May 1996	Hong Kong	1	Indonesia
European Zone	14 – 21 February 1998	Sandefjord	3	Denmark
European Zone	14 – 21 February 1998	Sandefjord	3	England
European Zone	14 – 21 February 1998	Sandefjord	3	Netherlands
Asian Zone	15 – 22 February 1998	Manila	3	China
Asian Zone	15 – 22 February 1998	Manila	3	Japan
Asian Zone	15 – 22 February 1998	Manila	3	South Korea
Total			8	

== Medal summary ==
=== Medalists ===
Event	Gold	Silver	Bronze
Thomas Cup	Indonesia; Hariyanto Arbi; Hendrawan; Marleve Mainaky; Indra Wijaya; Joko Supriyanto; Rexy Mainaky; Ricky Subagja; Sigit Budiarto; Candra Wijaya	Malaysia; Ong Ewe Hock; Yong Hock Kin; Roslin Hashim; Wong Choong Hann; Cheah Soon Kit; Choong Tan Fook; Yap Kim Hock; Lee Wan Wah; Tan Kim Her	China; Sun Jun; Luo Yigang; Dong Jiong; Chen Gang; Liu Yong; Yu Jinhao; Zhang Jun; Zhang Wei; Yang Ming
Thomas Cup	Indonesia; Hariyanto Arbi; Hendrawan; Marleve Mainaky; Indra Wijaya; Joko Supriyanto; Rexy Mainaky; Ricky Subagja; Sigit Budiarto; Candra Wijaya	Malaysia; Ong Ewe Hock; Yong Hock Kin; Roslin Hashim; Wong Choong Hann; Cheah Soon Kit; Choong Tan Fook; Yap Kim Hock; Lee Wan Wah; Tan Kim Her	Denmark; Peter Gade; Poul-Erik Høyer Larsen; Peter Rasmussen; Kenneth Jonassen; Jon Holst-Christensen; Michael Søgaard; Jens Eriksen; Jesper Larsen; Jim Laugesen; Thomas Stavngaard
Uber Cup	China; Ye Zhaoying; Gong Zhichao; Dai Yun; Han Jingna; Ge Fei; Gu Jun; Qin Yiyuan; Tang Yongshu; Liu Lu; Qian Hong	Indonesia; Susi Susanti; Mia Audina; Meiluawati; Ellen Angelina; Cindana Hartono; Eliza Nathanael; Zelin Resiana; Indarti Issolina; Deyana Lomban; Finarsih	South Korea; Kim Ji-hyun; Lee Joo-hyun; Lee Kyung-won; Lee Soon-deuk; Jang Hye-ock; Ra Kyung-min; Kim Mee-hyang; Kim Shin-young; Chung Jae-hee
Uber Cup	China; Ye Zhaoying; Gong Zhichao; Dai Yun; Han Jingna; Ge Fei; Gu Jun; Qin Yiyuan; Tang Yongshu; Liu Lu; Qian Hong	Indonesia; Susi Susanti; Mia Audina; Meiluawati; Ellen Angelina; Cindana Hartono; Eliza Nathanael; Zelin Resiana; Indarti Issolina; Deyana Lomban; Finarsih	Denmark; Camilla Martin; Mette Pedersen; Mette Sørensen; Anne Søndergaard; Rikke Olsen; Marlene Thomsen; Ann Jørgensen; Majken Vange; Pernille Harder; Helene Kirkegaard

=== Medal table ===
* Host nation (Hong Kong)

Rank	Nation	Gold	Silver	Bronze	Total
1	Indonesia	1	1	0	2
2	China	1	0	1	2
3	Malaysia	0	1	0	1
4	Denmark	0	0	2	2
5	South Korea	0	0	1	1
Totals (5 entries)		2	2	4	8

== Thomas Cup ==
=== Group stage ===
==== Group A ====
Pos	Team	Pld	W	L	GF	GA	GD	PF	PA	PD	Pts	Qualification
1	Denmark	3	3	0	26	9	+17	503	330	+173	3	Advance to semi-finals
2	China	3	2	1	25	10	+15	473	337	+136	2	Advance to semi-finals
3	Sweden	3	1	2	13	23	−10	345	472	−127	1	
4	Hong Kong (H)	3	0	3	6	28	−22	308	490	−182	0	

Source: The Straits Times
(H) Host

16 May 1998
18:30 UTC+8

China	5–0	Sweden
Report

Queen Elizabeth Stadium, Hong Kong

16 May 1998
18:30 UTC+8

Denmark	4–1	Hong Kong
Report

Queen Elizabeth Stadium, Hong Kong

18 May 1998
18:30 UTC+8

China	5–0	Hong Kong
Report

Queen Elizabeth Stadium, Hong Kong

18 May 1998
18:30 UTC+8

Denmark	4–1	Sweden
Report

Queen Elizabeth Stadium, Hong Kong

20 May 1998
18:30 UTC+8

Sweden	4–1	Hong Kong
Report

Queen Elizabeth Stadium, Hong Kong

20 May 1998
18:30 UTC+8

China	2–3	Denmark
Report

Queen Elizabeth Stadium, Hong Kong

==== Group B ====
Pos	Team	Pld	W	L	GF	GA	GD	PF	PA	PD	Pts	Qualification
1	Indonesia	3	3	0	27	5	+22	457	234	+223	3	Advance to semi-finals
2	Malaysia	3	2	1	21	11	+10	402	333	+69	2	Advance to semi-finals
3	South Korea	3	1	2	12	21	−9	327	415	−88	1	
4	Netherlands	3	0	3	4	27	−23	234	438	−204	0	

Source: The Straits Times

16 May 1998
12:00 UTC+8

Indonesia	5–0	Netherlands
Report

Queen Elizabeth Stadium, Hong Kong

16 May 1998
12:00 UTC+8

Malaysia	4–1	South Korea
Report

Queen Elizabeth Stadium, Hong Kong

18 May 1998
12:00 UTC+8

Indonesia	4–1	South Korea
Report

Queen Elizabeth Stadium, Hong Kong

18 May 1998
12:00 UTC+8

Malaysia	5–0	Netherlands
Report

Queen Elizabeth Stadium, Hong Kong

20 May 1998
12:00 UTC+8

Indonesia	4–1	Malaysia
Report

Queen Elizabeth Stadium, Hong Kong

20 May 1998
12:00 UTC+8

South Korea	3–2	Netherlands
Report

Queen Elizabeth Stadium, Hong Kong

=== Knockout stage ===
==== Bracket ====
Semi-finals
Denmark	2
Malaysia	3
China	2
Indonesia	3

Final
Malaysia	2
Indonesia	3

==== Semi-finals ====
22 May 1998
12:30 UTC+8

Denmark	2–3	Malaysia
Report

Queen Elizabeth Stadium, Hong Kong

22 May 1998
19:00 UTC+8

Indonesia	3–2	China
Report

Queen Elizabeth Stadium, Hong Kong

==== Final ====
24 May 1998
19:00 UTC+8

Indonesia	3–2	Malaysia
Report

Queen Elizabeth Stadium, Hong Kong

1998 Thomas Cup winner

Indonesia
Eleventh title

== Uber Cup ==
=== Group stage ===
==== Group A ====
Pos	Team	Pld	W	L	GF	GA	GD	PF	PA	PD	Pts	Qualification
1	China	3	3	0	29	2	+27	371	141	+230	3	Advance to semi-finals
2	Denmark	3	2	1	19	13	+6	303	281	+22	2	Advance to semi-finals
3	Japan	3	1	2	13	22	−9	293	357	−64	1	
4	Hong Kong (H)	3	0	3	5	29	−24	226	414	−188	0	

Source: The Straits Times
(H) Host

15 May 1998
18:30 UTC+8

China	5–0	Hong Kong
Report

Queen Elizabeth Stadium, Hong Kong

15 May 1998
18:30 UTC+8

Denmark	5–0	Japan
Report

Queen Elizabeth Stadium, Hong Kong

17 May 1998
18:30 UTC+8

China	4–1	Japan
Report

Queen Elizabeth Stadium, Hong Kong

17 May 1998
18:30 UTC+8

Denmark	4–1	Hong Kong
Report

Queen Elizabeth Stadium, Hong Kong

19 May 1998
18:30 UTC+8

China	5–0	Denmark
Report

Queen Elizabeth Stadium, Hong Kong

19 May 1998
18:30 UTC+8

Japan	5–0	Hong Kong
Report

Queen Elizabeth Stadium, Hong Kong

==== Group B ====
Pos	Team	Pld	W	L	GF	GA	GD	PF	PA	PD	Pts	Qualification
1	Indonesia	3	3	0	24	11	+13	389	275	+114	3	Advance to semi-finals
2	South Korea	3	2	1	24	10	+14	370	279	+91	2	Advance to semi-finals
3	England	3	1	2	12	22	−10	280	371	−91	1	
4	Netherlands	3	0	3	9	26	−17	293	407	−114	0	

Source: The Straits Times

15 May 1998
12:30 UTC+8

Indonesia	5–0	England
Report

Queen Elizabeth Stadium, Hong Kong

15 May 1998
12:30 UTC+8

South Korea	5–0	Netherlands
Report

Queen Elizabeth Stadium, Hong Kong

17 May 1998
12:30 UTC+8

Indonesia	3–2	Netherlands
Report

Queen Elizabeth Stadium, Hong Kong

17 May 1998
12:30 UTC+8

South Korea	4–1	England
Report

Queen Elizabeth Stadium, Hong Kong

19 May 1998
12:30 UTC+8

Indonesia	3–2	South Korea
Report

Queen Elizabeth Stadium, Hong Kong

19 May 1998
12:30 UTC+8

England	5–0	Netherlands
Report

Queen Elizabeth Stadium, Hong Kong

=== Knockout stage ===
==== Bracket ====
Semi-finals
China	5
South Korea	0
Denmark	1
Indonesia	4

Final
China	4
Indonesia	1

==== Semi-finals ====
21 May 1998
12:30 UTC+8

Indonesia	4–1	Denmark
Report

Queen Elizabeth Stadium, Hong Kong

21 May 1998
19:00 UTC+8

China	5–0	South Korea
Report

Queen Elizabeth Stadium, Hong Kong

==== Final ====
23 May 1998
19:00 UTC+8

Indonesia	1–4	China
Report

Queen Elizabeth Stadium, Hong Kong

1998 Uber Cup winner

China
Sixth title
