= David Seetapun =

English logician and former investment banker

David Seetapun is an English logician and former investment banker.

== Academic Work ==
During the fall of 1990, David Seetapun was said to have "used a very interesting 0′′′- priority argument to prove that every r.e. degree 0 < a < 0′ is locally noncappable, namely (∀a) 0 < a < 0′ (∃c) a < c (∀b) b < c [a∩b = 0 => b = 0]". Seetapun received a PhD in logic from Cambridge in 1991, the topic was "Contributions to recursion theory". He went on to a post-doctoral position at Berkeley where in 1995 he published an influential article with his post-doctoral adviser Theodore Slaman applying reverse mathematics to Ramsey's theorem. He also proposed the so-called "Seetapun Enigma", a mathematical puzzle that was not solved until 2010 by Chinese undergraduate student Liu Lu.

== Banking ==
After leaving academia, he took a job for Credit Suisse, but was offered a job by Goldman Sachs. Seetapun made a reputation for himself managing a trading venture with mathematical models, and has been cited as "Goldman's top London proprietary options trader", making over $500m. He left Goldman in March 1998, when he was rehired by Credit Suisse. In 1998 his models started to fail causing a loss of his own funds as well as for the firm. He currently works at Waymo, which was formerly Google's self-driving car project.
