= 1998 Uber Cup knockout stage =

1998 Knockout stage of the Thomas Cup badminton team championship

The knockout stage for the 1998 Thomas Cup in Hong Kong began on 22 May 1998 with the semi-finals and ended on 24 May 1998 with the final.

== Qualified teams ==
The top two placed teams from each of the two groups qualified for this stage.

Group	Winners	Runners-up
A	China	Denmark
B	Indonesia	South Korea

== Bracket ==
Semi-finals
China	5
South Korea	0
Denmark	1
Indonesia	4

Final
China	4
Indonesia	1

== Semi-finals ==
=== Semi-final 1 ===
Indonesia
4
Queen Elizabeth Stadium
21 May 1998, 12:30 UTC+8

Denmark
1

			1	2	3
1	(Indonesia) (Denmark)	Susi Susanti; Camilla Martin	7; 11	11; 5	11; 4
2	(Indonesia) (Denmark)	Eliza Nathanael / Zelin Resiana; Rikke Olsen / Marlene Thomsen	15; 6	15; 9
3	(Indonesia) (Denmark)	Mia Audina; Mette Pedersen	12; 11	11; 4
4	(Indonesia) (Denmark)	Indarti Issolina / Deyana Lomban; Ann Jørgensen / Camilla Martin	6; 15	15; 8	15; 7
5	(Indonesia) (Denmark)	Ellen Angelina; Mette Sørensen	1; 11	5; 11

=== Semi-final 2 ===
China
5
Queen Elizabeth Stadium
21 May 1998, 19:00 UTC+8

South Korea
0

			1	2	3
1	(China) (South Korea)	Ye Zhaoying; Kim Ji-hyun	11; 5	11; 7
2	(China) (South Korea)	Gong Zhichao; Lee Joo-hyun	11; 4	11; 0
3	(China) (South Korea)	Dai Yun; Lee Kyung-won	11; 8	11; 8
4	(China) (South Korea)	Ge Fei / Gu Jun; Jang Hye-ock / Ra Kyung-min	15; 10	15; 8
5	(China) (South Korea)	Qin Yiyuan / Tang Yongshu; Kim Mee-hyang / Kim Shin-young	15; 1	15; 8

== Final ==
Indonesia
1
Queen Elizabeth Stadium
23 May 1998, 19:00 UTC+8

China
4

			1	2	3
1	(Indonesia) (China)	Susi Susanti; Ye Zhaoying	9; 11	12; 10	5; 11
2	(Indonesia) (China)	Indarti Isolina / Zelin Resiana; Ge Fei / Gu Jun	7; 15	1; 15
3	(Indonesia) (China)	Mia Audina; Gong Zhichao	11; 9	10; 12	4; 11
4	(Indonesia) (China)	Deyana Lomban / Eliza Nathanael; Qin Yiyuan / Tang Yongshu	5; 15	15; 11	15; 9
5	(Indonesia) (China)	Meiluawati; Dai Yun	3; 11	6; 11
