= Janek Roos =

Danish badminton player

Personal information
- Born: 6 November 1974 (age 52)
- Height: 1.97 m (6 ft 6 in)

Sport
- Country: Denmark
- Sport: Badminton
- Handedness: Right
- Event: Doubles

Doubles
- BWF profile
Medal record
Men's badminton
Representing Denmark
European Junior Championships
Gold medal – first place	1993 Sofia	Boys' doubles
Gold medal – first place	1993 Sofia	Mixed team

Janek Roos (born 6 November 1974) is a Danish retired badminton player affiliated with Kastrup-Magleby club. Besides competing in international badminton, Roos also excelled in handball.

== Achievements ==
=== European Junior Championships ===
Boys' doubles
Year	Venue	Partner	Opponent	Score	Result
1993	Hristo Botev Hall; Sofia, Bulgaria	(Denmark) Jim Laugesen	(Denmark) Thomas Søgaard (Denmark) Thomas Stavngaard	15–12, 15–9	Gold

=== IBF World Grand Prix ===
The World Badminton Grand Prix sanctioned by International Badminton Federation (IBF) since 1983.

Men's doubles
Year	Tournament	Partner	Opponent	Score	Result
1993	Polish International	(Denmark) Jim Laugesen	(Indonesia) Felix Antonius (Indonesia) Denny Kantono	1–15, 7–15	(silver) Runner-up

Mixed doubles
Year	Tournament	Partner	Opponent	Score	Result
1997	Russian Open	(Denmark) Helene Kirkegaard	(Denmark) Jon Holst-Christensen (Denmark) Ann Jørgensen	15–8, 10–15, 4–15	(silver) Runner-up
1999	German Open	(Denmark) Marlene Thomsen	(Denmark) Lars Paaske (Denmark) Jane F. Bramsen	10–15, 11–15	(silver) Runner-up

=== IBF International ===
Men's singles
Year	Tournament	Opponent	Score	Result
2005	Brazil International	(Spain) Pablo Abián	1–15, 6–15	(silver) Runner-up

Men's doubles
Year	Tournament	Partner	Opponent	Score	Result
1995	Amor International	(Denmark) Allan Borch	(Poland) Robert Mateusiak (Poland) Damian Pławecki	14–18, 15–6, 15–4	(gold) Winner
1995	Austrian International	(Denmark) Allan Borch	(Germany) Marek Bujak (Denmark) Niels Christian Kaldau	15–10, 15–9	(gold) Winner
1995	Malmö International	(Denmark) Thomas Stavngaard	(Denmark) Jesper Larsen (Sweden) Stellan Österberg	16–18, 15–5, 15–7	(gold) Winner
1995	Czech International	(Denmark) Thomas Stavngaard	(Ukraine) Konstantin Tatranov (Ukraine) Valeriy Strelcov	15–2, 15–11	(gold) Winner
1996	Amor International	(Denmark) Allan Borch	(Russia) Artur Khachaturjan (Russia) Sergei Melnikov	15–9, 12–15, 12–15	(silver) Runner-up
2000	Portugal International	(Denmark) Joachim Fischer Nielsen	(Denmark) Thomas Hovgaard (Denmark) Ove Svejstrup	12–15, 15–2,15–0	(gold) Winner
2000	Austrian International	(Denmark) Joachim Fischer Nielsen	(Austria) Harald Koch (Austria) Jürgen Koch	12–15, 15–8, 15–9	(gold) Winner
2005	Brazil International	(Canada) Philippe Bourret	(Wales) Martyn Lewis (Wales) Matthew Hughes	12–15, 10–15	(silver) Runner-up

Mixed doubles
Year	Tournament	Partner	Opponent	Score	Result
1995	Amor International	(Denmark) Charlotte Madsen	(Netherlands) Ron Michels (Netherlands) Nicole van Hooren	15–12, 15–12	(gold) Winner
1995	Austrian International	(Denmark) Mette Schjoldager	(Germany) Björn Siegemund (Germany) Katrin Schmidt	7–15, 15–11, 10–15	(silver) Runner-up
1995	Czech International	(Denmark) Pernille Harder	(Denmark) Thomas Stavngaard (Denmark) Mette Schjoldager	4–15, 15–4, 15–8	(gold) Winner
1995	Norwegian International	(Denmark) Mette Schjoldager	(Denmark) Thomas Stavngaard (Denmark) Ann-Lou Jørgensen	12–15, 8–15	(silver) Runner-up
1997	Strasbourg International	(Denmark) Rikke Broen	(France) Vincent Laigle (France) Sandrine Lefèvre	15–7, 15–4	(gold) Winner
