= Liu Lu =

Chinese researcher

- 刘路
- Born: April 2, 1989 (age 37); Dalian, Liaoning, China
- Education: Central South University
- Scientific career
- Fields: Mathematics
- Workplaces: Central South University

Chinese name
- Traditional Chinese: 劉路
- Simplified Chinese: 刘路
Transcriptions
Standard Mandarin
- Hanyu Pinyin: Liǘ Lù

Liu Lu (Chinese: 刘路; born 2 April 1989) is a Chinese researcher in the field of mathematics at Central South University in Changsha, Hunan.

When he was a 22-year-old undergraduate student, Lu proved that Ramsey theorem for infinite graphs (the case n = 2) with 2-coloring does not imply WKL_{0} over RCA_{0}, solving an open problem left by English logician David Seetapun in the 1990s (Liu (2012)).
