= Jim Laugesen =

Danish badminton player

Personal information
- Born: 10 November 1974 (age 52) Gentofte, Denmark
- Height: 1.85 m (6 ft 1 in)
- Weight: 83 kg (183 lb)

Sport
- Country: Denmark
- Sport: Badminton
- Handedness: Right
- Event: Men's singles & doubles

Men's singles & doubles
- BWF profile
Medal record
Men's badminton
Representing Denmark
Sudirman Cup
Bronze medal – third place	2001 Seville	Mixed team
Thomas Cup
Silver medal – second place	1996 Hong Kong	Men's team
Bronze medal – third place	1998 Hong Kong	Men's team
European Championships
Silver medal – second place	1994 Den Bosch	Mixed team
Bronze medal – third place	1994 Den Bosch	Men's doubles
World Junior Championships
Gold medal – first place	1992 Jakarta	Mixed doubles
European Junior Championships
Gold medal – first place	1993 Sofia	Boys' singles
Gold medal – first place	1993 Sofia	Boys' doubles
Gold medal – first place	1993 Sofia	Mixed team
Bronze medal – third place	1991 Budapest	Boys' doubles
Bronze medal – third place	1991 Budapest	Mixed team

Jim Laugesen (born 10 November 1974) is a Danish former badminton player. He was the 1992 World Junior Champion in the mixed doubles event partnered with Rikke Olsen. He competed at the 2000 Summer Olympics in Sydney, Australia partnered with Michael Søgaard reaching in to the second round. Laugesen was dismissed from the Danmarks Badminton Forbund (DBS) center in September 2004. He now works as a badminton journalist at TV 2 in Denmark, and as a badminton coach in Gentofte Badminton Klub.

== Achievements ==
=== European Championships ===
Men's doubles
Year	Venue	Partner	Opponent	Score	Result
1994	Maaspoort Sports and Events; Den Bosch, Netherlands	(Denmark) Henrik Svarrer	(Russia) Andrei Antropov (Russia) Nikolai Zuyev	11–15, 15–6, 7–15	Bronze

=== World Junior Championships ===
Mixed doubles
Year	Venue	Partner	Opponent	Score	Result
1992	Istora Senayan; Jakarta, Indonesia	(Denmark) Rikke Olsen	(South Korea) Kim Dong-moon (South Korea) Kim Shin-young	15–11, 18–17	Gold

=== European Junior Championships ===
Boys' singles
Year	Venue	Opponent	Score	Result
1993	Hristo Botev Hall; Sofia, Bulgaria	(Sweden) Rasmus Wengberg	15–9, 15–10	Gold

Boys' doubles
Year	Venue	Partner	Opponent	Score	Result
1991	BMTE-Törley impozáns sportcsarnokában Budapest, Hungary	(Denmark) Thomas Damgaard	(Soviet Union) Vladislav Druzchenko (Soviet Union) Valeriy Strelcov	16–18, 7–15	Bronze
1993	Hristo Botev Hall; Sofia, Bulgaria	(Denmark) Janek Roos	(Denmark) Thomas Søgaard (Denmark) Thomas Stavngaard	15–12, 15–9	Gold

=== IBF World Grand Prix ===
The World Badminton Grand Prix sanctioned by International Badminton Federation (IBF) since 1983.

Men's singles
Year	Tournament	Opponent	Score	Result
1995	Scottish Open	(England) Peter Knowles	11–15, 7–15	(silver) Runner-up

Men's doubles
Year	Tournament	Partner	Opponent	Score	Result
1993	Denmark Open	(Denmark) Henrik Svarrer	(Denmark) Jon Holst-Christensen (Denmark) Thomas Lund	5–15, 5–15	(silver) Runner-up
1996	Denmark Open	(Denmark) Thomas Stavngaard	(England) Simon Archer (England) Chris Hunt	17–15, 10–15, 15–7	(gold) Winner
1996	Scottish Open	(Denmark) Thomas Stavngaard	(China) Chen Wei (China) Ji Xinpeng	15–9, 15–11	(gold) Winner
1997	Russian Open	(Denmark) Thomas Stavngaard	(Denmark) Jon Holst-Christensen (Denmark) Michael Søgaard	9–15, 13–15	(silver) Runner-up
1999	Swiss Open	(Denmark) Michael Søgaard	(Denmark) Jens Eriksen (Denmark) Jesper Larsen	15–6, 12–15, 16–17	(silver) Runner-up
1999	Thailand Open	(Denmark) Michael Søgaard	(China) Chen Qiqiu (China) Yu Jinhao	11–15, 13–15	(silver) Runner-up
1999	Denmark Open	(Denmark) Michael Søgaard	(Denmark) Martin Lundgaard Hansen (Denmark) Lars Paaske	13–15, 10–15	(silver) Runner-up
2000	German Open	(Denmark) Michael Søgaard	(Denmark) Michael Lamp (Denmark) Jonas Rasmussen	16–17, 15–10, 15–7	(gold) Winner
2000	Dutch Open	(Denmark) Michael Søgaard	(Indonesia) Sigit Budiarto (Indonesia) Halim Haryanto	11–15, 4–15	(silver) Runner-up
2001	Swiss Open	(Denmark) Michael Søgaard	(Denmark) Jens Eriksen (Denmark) Jesper Larsen	4–7, 7–2, 1–7, 7–1, 7–3	(gold) Winner
2001	German Open	(Denmark) Michael Søgaard	(Denmark) Michael Lamp (Denmark) Jonas Rasmussen	7–1, 7–1, 3–7, 7–4	(gold) Winner
2001	Denmark Open	(Denmark) Michael Søgaard	(Denmark) Martin Lundgaard Hansen (Denmark) Lars Paaske	5–7, 7–3, 8–6, 3–7, 1–7	(silver) Runner-up
2002	German Open	(Denmark) Michael Søgaard	(Denmark) Lars Paaske (Denmark) Jonas Rasmussen	15–10, 9–15, 6–15	(silver) Runner-up

=== IBF International ===
Men's singles
Year	Tournament	Opponent	Score	Result
1993	Czech International	(Denmark) Jan Jørgensen	6–15, 15–6, 15–1	(gold) Winner

Men's doubles
Year	Tournament	Partner	Opponent	Score	Result
1993	Polish International	(Denmark) Janek Roos	(Indonesia) Felix Antonius (Indonesia) Denny Kantono	1–15, 7–15	(silver) Runner-up
1995	Norwegian International	(Denmark) Thomas Stavngaard	(Denmark) Jesper Larsen (Sweden) Stellan Österberg	11–15, 15–10, 15–12	(gold) Winner
1995	Irish International	(Denmark) Thomas Stavngaard	(Denmark) Jan Jørgensen (Denmark) Peder Nissen	15–11, 15–0	(gold) Winner
2003	Portugal International	(Denmark) Michael Søgaard	(Denmark) Mathias Boe (Denmark) Michael Lamp	15–7, 15–3	(gold) Winner
