= Jesper Larsen =

Danish badminton player (born 1972)

Personal information
- Born: Jesper Alsing Larsen; 29 October 1972 (age 54) Faaborg, Denmark
- Height: 1.80 m (5 ft 11 in)
- Weight: 71 kg (157 lb)

Sport
- Country: Denmark
- Sport: Badminton
- Handedness: Right
- Event: Men's & mixed doubles

Men's & mixed doubles
- BWF profile
Medal record
Men's badminton
Representing Denmark
Sudirman Cup
Silver medal – second place	1999 Copenhagen	Mixed team
Bronze medal – third place	1997 Glasgow	Mixed team
Bronze medal – third place	2001 Seville	Mixed team
Thomas Cup
Bronze medal – third place	1998 Hong Kong	Men's team
Bronze medal – third place	2000 Kuala Lumpur	Men's team
European Championships
Gold medal – first place	2000 Glasgow	Men's doubles
European Mixed Team Championships
Gold medal – first place	2000 Glasgow	Mixed team

Jesper Alsing Larsen (born 29 October 1972) is a badminton player from Denmark who affiliated with Hvidovre BK. He won the men's doubles gold medal along with partner Jens Eriksen at the 2000 European Championships. Larsen and Eriksen competed at the 2000 Summer Olympics in Sydney, Australia, and finished in the quarter-finals stage.

== Achievements ==
=== European Championships ===
Men's doubles
Year	Venue	Partner	Opponent	Score	Result
2000	Kelvin Hall International Sports Arena; Glasgow, Scotland	(Denmark) Jens Eriksen	(Sweden) Peter Axelsson (Sweden) Pär-Gunnar Jönsson	15–7, 15–6	Gold

=== IBF World Grand Prix ===
The World Badminton Grand Prix sanctioned by International Badminton Federation (IBF) from 1983 to 2006.

Men's doubles
Year	Tournament	Partner	Opponent	Score	Result
1995	Scottish Open	(Sweden) Stellan Österberg	(England) Nick Ponting (England) Julian Robertson	5–15, 6–15	(silver) Runner-up
1997	German Open	(Denmark) Jens Eriksen	(England) Simon Archer (England) Chris Hunt	15–1, 15–8	(gold) Winner
1997	Dutch Open	(Denmark) Jens Eriksen	(England) Nick Ponting (England) John Quinn	7–15, 15–8, 15–6	(gold) Winner
1997	Denmark Open	(Denmark) Jens Eriksen	(Denmark) Jon Holst-Christensen (Denmark) Michael Søgaard	17–14, 8–15, 13–18	(silver) Runner-up
1998	Hong Kong Open	(Denmark) Jens Eriksen	(Indonesia) Tony Gunawan (Indonesia) Candra Wijaya	10–15, 9–15	(silver) Runner-up
1999	Korea Open	(Denmark) Jens Eriksen	(Indonesia) Eng Hian (Indonesia) Flandy Limpele	15–6, 7–15, 9–15	(silver) Runner-up
1999	Swiss Open	(Denmark) Jens Eriksen	(Denmark) Jim Laugesen (Denmark) Michael Søgaard	15–6, 12–15, 17–16	(gold) Winner
2000	Swiss Open	(Denmark) Jens Eriksen	(South Korea) Ha Tae-kwon (South Korea) Kim Dong-moon	12–15, 2–15	(silver) Runner-up
2000	Denmark Open	(Denmark) Jens Eriksen	(Indonesia) Eng Hian (Indonesia) Flandy Limpele	13–15, 10–15	(silver) Runner-up
2001	Swiss Open	(Denmark) Jens Eriksen	(Denmark) Jim Laugesen (Denmark) Michael Søgaard	7–4, 2–7, 7–1, 1–7, 3–7	(silver) Runner-up
2001	Dutch Open	(Denmark) Jesper Christensen	(Denmark) Martin Lundgaard Hansen (Denmark) Lars Paaske	7–4, 3–7, 7–5, 4–7, 7–5	(gold) Winner
2004	German Open	(Denmark) Joachim Fischer Nielsen	(Denmark) Mathias Boe (Denmark) Carsten Mogensen	6–15, 14–17	(silver) Runner-up

=== IBF International ===
Men's doubles
Year	Tournament	Partner	Opponent	Score	Result
1994	Norwegian International	(United States) Thomas Reidy	(Sweden) Magnus Jansson (Sweden) Stellan Österberg	15–7, 15–10	(gold) Winner
1995	Malmö International	(Sweden) Stellan Österberg	(Denmark) Janek Roos (Denmark) Thomas Stavngaard	18–16, 5–15, 7–15	(silver) Runner-up
1995	Norwegian International	(Sweden) Stellan Österberg	(Denmark) Jim Laugesen (Denmark) Thomas Stavngaard	15–11, 10–15, 12–15	(silver) Runner-up
1996	Austrian International	(Denmark) Peder Nissen	(Russia) Artur Khachaturjan (Russia) Sergei Melnikov	15–12, 15–9	(gold) Winner
1996	French Open	(Denmark) Peder Nissen	(Indonesia) Dharma Gunawi (Germany) Michael Keck	10–15, 8–15	(silver) Runner-up
1996	Malmö International	(Denmark) Peder Nissen	(Sweden) Anders Hansson (Sweden) Robert Larsson	9–15, 7–15	(silver) Runner-up
2002	Scottish International	(Denmark) Jesper Christensen	(Denmark) Tommy Sørensen (Denmark) Jesper Thomsen	15–6, 15–9	(gold) Winner
2003	Iceland International	(Denmark) Joachim Fischer Nielsen	(England) David Lindley (England) Kristian Roebuck	15–8, 15–9	(gold) Winner
2004	Swedish International	(Denmark) Joachim Fischer Nielsen	(Poland) Michał Łogosz (Poland) Robert Mateusiak	15–4, 13–15, 12–15	(silver) Runner-up
2004	French International	(Denmark) Joachim Fischer Nielsen	(Malaysia) Gan Teik Chai (Malaysia) Koo Kien Keat	6–15, 15–17	(silver) Runner-up
2004	Spanish Open	(Denmark) Joachim Fischer Nielsen	(Wales) Matthew Hughes (Wales) Martyn Lewis	15–6, 15–5	(gold) Winner

Mixed doubles
Year	Tournament	Partner	Opponent	Score	Result
1994	Strasbourg International	(Sweden) Ann Sandersson			(gold) Winner
1994	La Chaux-de-Fonds International	(Sweden) Ann Sandersson	(Germany) Michael Keck (Germany) Karen Stechmann	4–15, 5–15	(silver) Runner-up
1995	Malmö International	(Sweden) Maria Bengtsson	(Denmark) Thomas Stavngaard (Denmark) Ann Jørgensen	9–15, 14–17	(silver) Runner-up
1996	French Open	(Denmark) Majken Vange	(Ukraine) Vladislav Druzchenko (Ukraine) Victoria Evtoushenko	15–8, 14–17, 15–11	(gold) Winner
1996	Malmö International	(Denmark) Majken Vange	(Sweden) Robert Larsson (Sweden) Maria Bengtsson	5–15, 11–15	(silver) Runner-up
1996	Irish International	(Denmark) Majken Vange	(Denmark) Jonas Rasmussen (Denmark) Ann-Lou Jørgensen	15–10, 8–15, 15–9	(gold) Winner
2003	Iceland International	(Denmark) Mie Nielsen	(England) Simon Archer (England) Donna Kellogg	13–15, 4–15	(silver) Runner-up
