= Beijing Jishuitan Hospital =

北京积水潭医院 Beijing Jishuitan Hospital

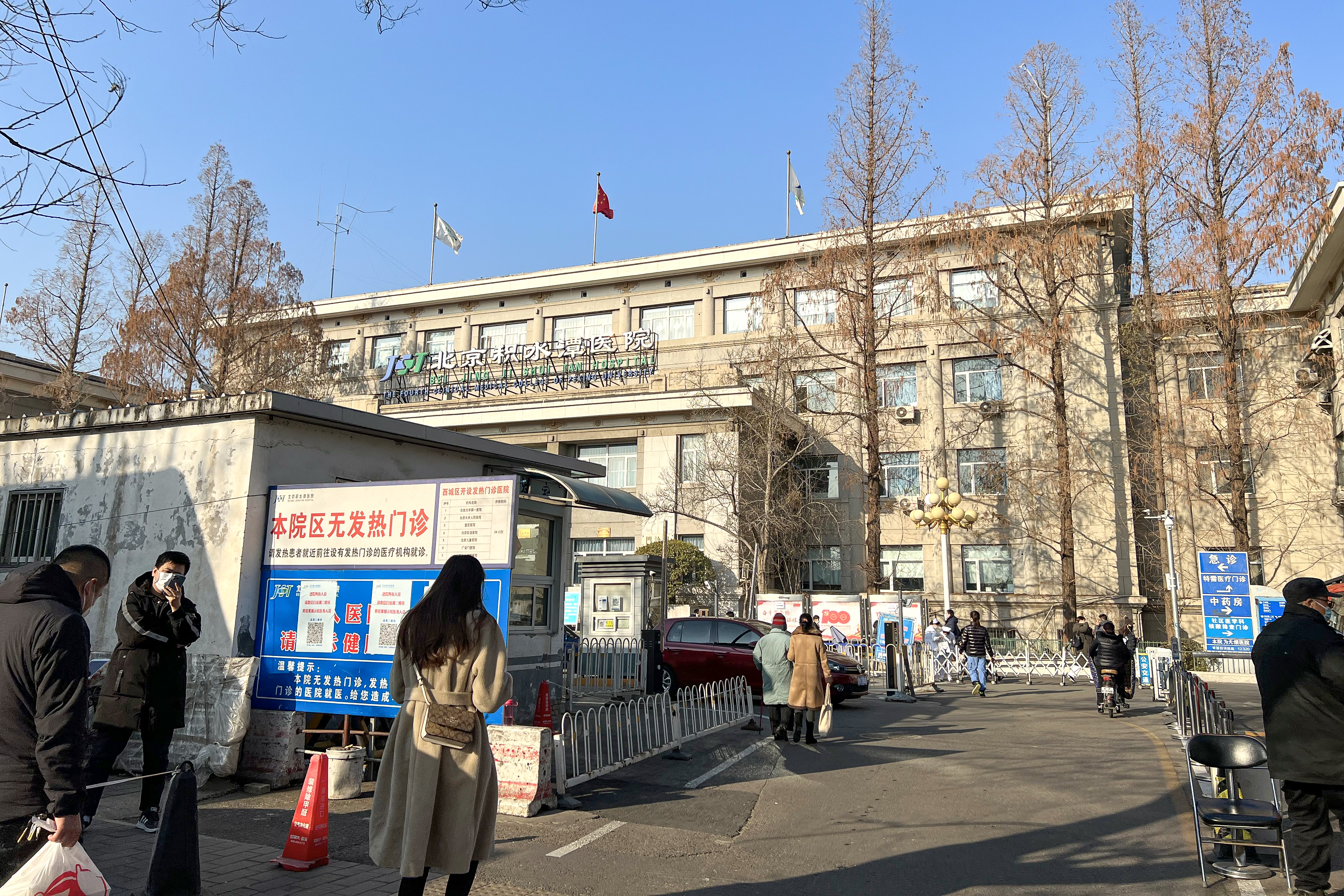

Geography
- Location: 31 Xinjiekou East Street, Xicheng District, Beijing, China
- Coordinates: 39.944519°N 116.376224°E

Organisation
- Care system: Public Hospital
- Type: Teaching, District General
- Affiliated university: Peking University Health Science Center

Services
- Emergency department: Level I trauma center
- Beds: 1000-odd

History
- Opened: 1956

Links
- Website: http://www.jst-hosp.com.cn/
- Lists: Hospitals in China

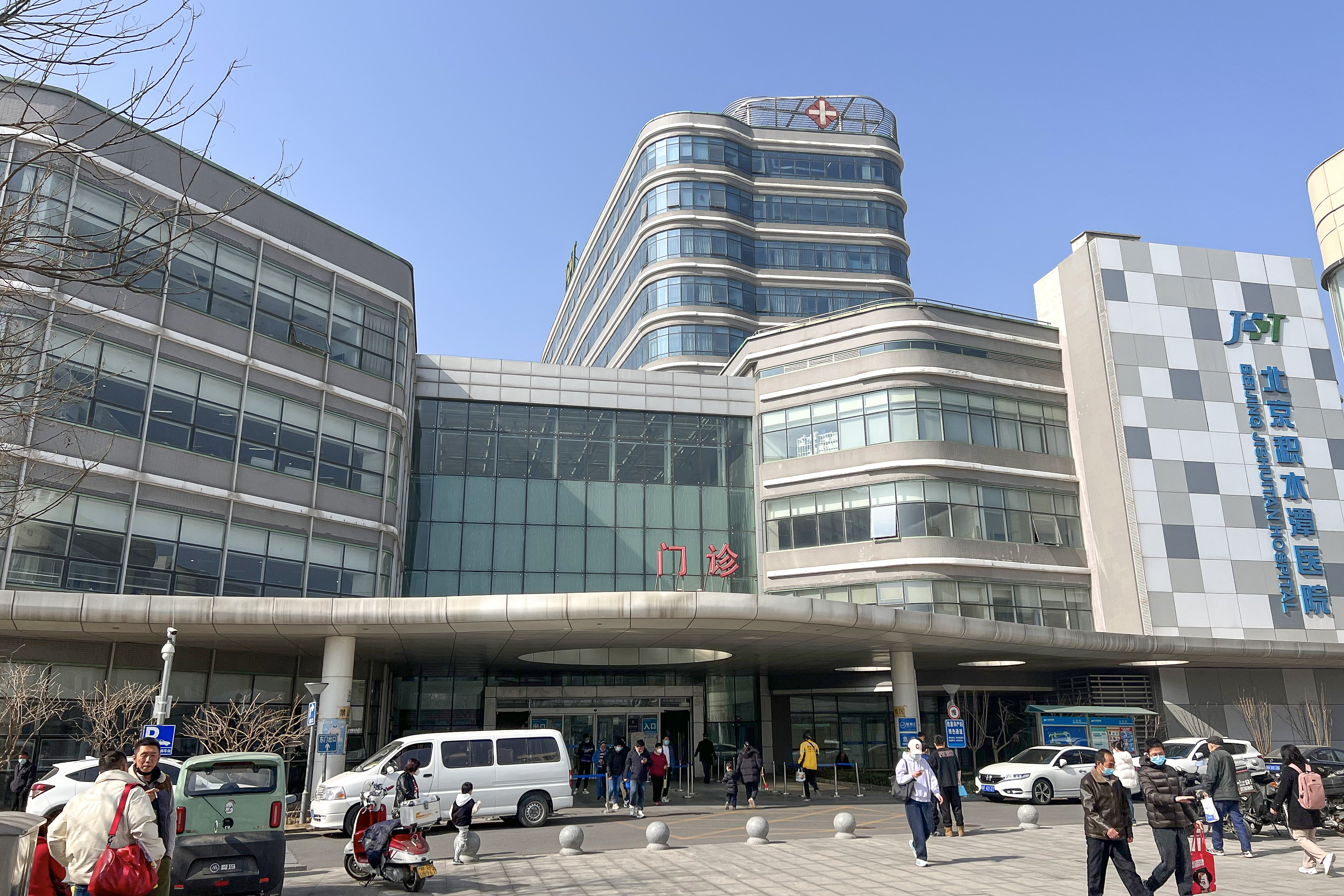
Huilongguan branch

Beijing Jishuitan Hospital (JST Hospital; simplified Chinese: 北京积水潭医院; traditional Chinese: 北京積水潭醫院) is a large public teaching hospital in Beijing, focusing mainly on orthopaedics and burn surgery. Founded in 1956, the hospital now has around 1000 beds. Its performance in medical care, teaching and researching led to it becoming the Fourth Medical College of Peking University. The hospital now has 200 doctors and 2200 other staff. The hospital has fully equipped departments of orthopaedics, spine surgery, adult joint reconstructive surgery, orthopaedic trauma, hand surgery, paediatric orthopaedics, bone tumor, sports medicines and burn surgery.

Some hospital departments, particularly orthopedics and burn surgery, are considered among the leading ones in China Special units based at the hospital include Beijing Bone and Arthropathy Research Center, Beijing Traumaotology and Orthopaedics Research Center, Beijing Hand Surgery Research Center, Beijing Burn Surgery Research Center, and Post Operative Total Joint Arthroplasty Evaluation Center. The first Orthopaedics Training Center was established on 27 April 2001.

Since its foundation, the hospital has won five state-level scientific awards.
