= Thomas Stavngaard =

Danish badminton player

Personal information
- Born: 7 September 1974 (age 52)
- Height: 1.78 m (5 ft 10 in)

Sport
- Country: Denmark
- Sport: Badminton
- Handedness: Left
- Event: Doubles

Doubles
- BWF profile
Medal record
Men's badminton
Representing Denmark
World Senior Championships
Silver medal – second place	2015 Helsingborg	Men's doubles 40+
Sudirman Cup
Bronze medal – third place	1997 Glasgow	Mixed team
Thomas Cup
Silver medal – second place	1996 Hong Kong	Men's team
Bronze medal – third place	1998 Hong Kong	Men's team
European Junior Championships
Gold medal – first place	1993 Sofia	Mixed doubles
Gold medal – first place	1993 Sofia	Mixed team
Silver medal – second place	1993 Sofia	Boys' doubles

Thomas Stavngaard (born 7 September 1974) is a Danish badminton player from Lillerød club. He is currently working as a coach for the National badminton team of Denmark.

== Achievements ==
=== World Senior Championships ===
Year	Venue	Event	Partner	Opponent	Score	Result
2015	Helsingborg Arena, Helsingborg, Sweden	Men's doubles 40+	(Denmark) Peter Rasmussen	(Indonesia) Heryanto Arbi (Indonesia) Tri Kusharjanto	19–21, 17–21	Silver

=== European Junior Championships ===
Boys' doubles
Year	Venue	Partner	Opponent	Score	Result
1993	Hristo Botev Hall; Sofia, Bulgaria	(Denmark) Thomas Søgaard	(Denmark) Janek Roos (Denmark) Jim Laugesen	12–15, 9–15	Silver

Mixed doubles
Year	Venue	Partner	Opponent	Score	Result
1993	Hristo Botev Hall; Sofia, Bulgaria	(Denmark) Sara Runesten	(Sweden) Johan Tholinsson (Sweden) Pernilla Carlsson	15–8, 15–8	Gold

=== IBF World Grand Prix ===
The World Badminton Grand Prix was sanctioned by the International Badminton Federation from 1983 to 2006.

Men's doubles
Year	Tournament	Partner	Opponent	Score	Result
1996	Denmark Open	(Denmark) Jim Laugesen	(England) Simon Archer (England) Chris Hunt	17–15, 10–15, 15–7	(gold) Winner
1996	Scottish Open	(Denmark) Jim Laugesen	(China) Chen Wei (China) Ji Xinpeng	15–9, 15–11	(gold) Winner
1997	Russian Open	(Denmark) Jim Laugesen	(Denmark) Jon Holst-Christensen (Denmark) Michael Søgaard	9–15, 13–15	(silver) Runner-up

Mixed doubles
Year	.Tournament	Partner	Opponent	Score	Result
1995	French Open	(Denmark) Anne Søndergaard	(Germany) Michael Keck (Germany) Karen Neumann	15–9, 17–14	(gold) Winner
1995	Hamburg Cup	(Denmark) Rikke Olsen	(Germany) Kai Mitteldorf (Germany) Katrin Schmidt	15–10, 17–18, 7–15	(silver) Runner-up
1996	Denmark Open	(Denmark) Ann Jørgensen	(Denmark) Michael Søgaard (Denmark) Rikke Olsen	5–15, 1–15	(silver) Runner-up

=== IBF International ===
Men's doubles
Year	Tournament	Partner	Opponent	Score	Result
1995	Malmö International	(Denmark) Janek Roos	(Denmark) Jesper Larsen (Sweden) Stellan Österberg	16–18, 15–5, 15–7	(gold) Winner
1995	Czech International	(Denmark) Janek Roos	(Ukraine) Konstantin Tatranov (Ukraine) Valerj Strelcov	15–2, 15–11	(gold) Winner
1995	Norwegian International	(Denmark) Jim Laugesen	(Denmark) Jesper Larsen (Sweden) Stellan Österberg	11–15, 15–10, 15–12	(gold) Winner
1995	Irish International	(Denmark) Jim Laugesen	(Denmark) Jan Jørgensen (Denmark) Peder Nissen	15–11, 15–0	(gold) Winner

Mixed doubles
Year	Tournament	Partner	Opponent	Score	Result
1995	Malmö International	(Denmark) Ann Jørgensen	(Denmark) Jesper Larsen (Sweden) Maria Bengtsson	15–9, 17–14	(gold) Winner
1995	Czech International	(Denmark) Mette Schjoldager	(Denmark) Janek Roos (Denmark) Pernille Harder	15–4, 4–15, 8–15	(silver) Runner-up
1995	Norwegian International	(Denmark) Ann-Lou Jørgensen	(Denmark) Janek Roos (Denmark) Mette Schjoldager	15–12, 15–8	(gold) Winner
