= 2015 BWF World Senior Championships – 35+ =

Tournament details
- Dates: 20 September 2015 – 26 September 2015
- Edition: 7
- Level: International
- Competitors: 206 from 29 nations
- Venue: Helsingborg Arena
- Location: Helsingborg, Sweden

Champions
- Men's singles: (Russia) Stanislav Pukhov
- Women's singles: (England) Rebecca Pantaney
- Men's doubles: (United States) Tony Gunawan (Indonesia) Flandy Limpele
- Women's doubles: (Japan) Kazumi Ichinohe (Japan) Noriko Sanada
- Mixed doubles: (Denmark) Tommy Sørensen (Denmark) Lisbeth T. Haagensen

This are the results of 2015 BWF World Senior Championships' 35+ events.

== Medalist ==
Event	Gold	Silver	Bronze
Men's singles	(Russia) Stanislav Pukhov	(Germany) Thorsten Hukriede	(Norway) Jim Ronny Andersen
Men's singles	(Russia) Stanislav Pukhov	(Germany) Thorsten Hukriede	(Denmark) Anders Boesen
Women's singles	(England) Rebecca Pantaney	(Japan) Mayumi Bando	(Germany) Claudia Vogelgsang
Women's singles	(England) Rebecca Pantaney	(Japan) Mayumi Bando	(Japan) Noriko Sanada
Men's doubles	(United States) Tony Gunawan (Indonesia) Flandy Limpele	(Thailand) Naruenart Chuaymak (Thailand) Apichai Thiraratsakul	(Denmark) Anders Boesen (Denmark) Andreas Borella
Men's doubles	(United States) Tony Gunawan (Indonesia) Flandy Limpele	(Thailand) Naruenart Chuaymak (Thailand) Apichai Thiraratsakul	(Netherlands) Gerben Bruijstens (Netherlands) Tjitte Weistra
Women's doubles	(Japan) Kazumi Ichinohe (Japan) Noriko Sanada	(Sweden) Sunniva Aminoff (Germany) Claudia Vogelgsang	(England) Rebecca Pantaney (England) Lynne Swan
Women's doubles	(Japan) Kazumi Ichinohe (Japan) Noriko Sanada	(Sweden) Sunniva Aminoff (Germany) Claudia Vogelgsang	(Chinese Taipei) Chen Hua-wei (Chinese Taipei) Chen Yu-fang
Mixed doubles	(Denmark) Tommy Sørensen (Denmark) Lisbeth T. Haagensen	(Germany) Thorsten Hukriede (Germany) Michaela Hukriede	(Germany) Maurice Niesner (Germany) Claudia Vogelgsang
Mixed doubles	(Denmark) Tommy Sørensen (Denmark) Lisbeth T. Haagensen	(Germany) Thorsten Hukriede (Germany) Michaela Hukriede	(Japan) Takata Eishi (Japan) Noriko Sanada

== Men's singles ==
=== Seeds ===
1. (Russia) Vadim Itckov (quarterfinals)
2. (Russia) Stanislav Pukhov (champion, gold medal)
3. (Denmark) Anders Boesen (semifinals, bronze medal)
4. (Netherlands) Tjitte Weistra (quarterfinals)
5. (France) Thomas Blondeau (third round)
6. (Germany) Thorsten Hukriede (final, silver medal)
7. (Denmark) Lars Klintrup (third round)
8. (Russia) Konstantin Myakishev (second round)
9. (Norway) Jim Ronny Andersen (semifinals, bronze medal)
10. (Thailand) Naruenart Chuaymak (quarterfinals)
11. (Switzerland) Oliver Colin (third round)
12. (Indonesia) Jeffer Rosobin (quarterfinals)
13. (England) Rohan Kapoor (third round)
14. (France) Eric Wasylyk (first round)
15. (Denmark) Andreas Borella (quarterfinals)
16. (Denmark) Morten Rasmussen (third round)

=== Finals ===
Semifinals
9	(Norway) Jim Ronny Andersen	21	22	12
6	(Germany) Thorsten Hukriede	8	24	21
3	(Denmark) Anders Boesen	16	18
2	(Russia) Stanislav Pukhov	21	21

Final
6	(Germany) Thorsten Hukriede	13	16
2	(Russia) Stanislav Pukhov	21	21

=== Top half ===
==== Section 1 ====
First Round
1	(Russia) V Itckov	21	21
(Portugal) M Gloria	10	7
(India) A Sharma	21	21
(Japan) M Masayuki	19	15
13	(England) R Kapoor	21	21
(Malaysia) Tan T H	10	9
(Netherlands) A van Gent	21	21
(Finland) A Tolonen	14	12
7	(Denmark) L Klintrup	21	21
(Poland) P Pasik	9	7
(Belgium) J Van den Brande	9	7
(Sweden) M Jansson	21	21
9	(Norway) J R Andersen	21	21
(Austria) N Schneider	1	7
(Switzerland) A Neuweiler	7	11
(France) S Bourbon	21	21

Second Round
1	(Russia) V Itckov	21	21
(India) A Sharma	17	14
13	(England) R Kapoor	21	20	21
(Netherlands) A van Gent	13	22	18
7	(Denmark) L Klintrup	11	21	21
(Sweden) M Jansson	21	8	16
9	(Norway) J R Andersen	21	21
(France) S Bourbon	11	12

Third Round
1	(Russia) V Itckov	21	21
13	(England) R Kapoor	12	16
7	(Denmark) L Klintrup	2	14
9	(Norway) J R Andersen	21	21

Quarterfinals
1	(Russia) V Itckov	3	9
9	(Norway) J R Andersen	21	21

==== Section 2 ====
First Round
4	(Netherlands) T Weistra	21	21
(Japan) N Tsutomo	15	13
(Spain) A Caballero	11	8
(Austria) W Kammel	21	21
14	(France) E Wasylyk	24	16	19
(Finland) A Koljonen	22	21	21
(England) P Troke	5	16
(Hungary) K Horváth	21	21
6	(Germany) T Hukriede	21	21
SUB	(Russia) S Igoshin	11	9
(Sweden) C Wiklander	14	9
(India) L Pannu	21	21
16	(Denmark) M Rasmussen	21	21
(Scotland) D Speirs	9	5
(Poland) K Maślanka	15	9
(Thailand) A Thiraratsakul	21	21'

Second Round
4	(Netherlands) T Weistra	21	21
(Austria) W Kammel	10	8
(Finland) A Koljonen	21	23
(Hungary) K Horváth	14	21
6	(Germany) T Hukriede	21	21
(India) L Pannu	16	16
16	(Denmark) M Rasmussen	21	21
(Thailand) A Thiraratsakul	13	15

Third Round
4	(Netherlands) T Weistra	22	21
(Finland) A Koljonen	20	19
6	(Germany) T Hukriede	9	21	21
16	(Denmark) M Rasmussen	21	19	14

Quarterfinals
4	(Netherlands) T Weistra	14	17
6	(Germany) T Hukriede	21	21

=== Bottom half ===
==== Section 3 ====
First Round
(Germany) A Schulz	17	21	23
(Sweden) F du Hane	21	17	25
(England) M Trebble	4	8
10	(Thailand) N Chuaymak	21	21
(Norway) J E Gulli	7	9
(France) X Engrand	21	21
(Austria) C Horejš-Kainrath	7	7
8	(Russia) K Myakishev	21	21
(Japan) H Yutaka	16	21	13
(Spain) J Laviña	21	18	21
(India) S Abbasi	9	13
11	(Switzerland) O Colin	21	21
(Finland) I Kokko	21	21
(Poland) J Szałapski	6	6
(Netherlands) E Tan	9	8
3	(Denmark) A Boesen	21	21

Second Round
(Sweden) F du Hane	16	8
10	(Thailand) N Chuaymak	21	21
(France) X Engrand	21	21
8	(Russia) K Myakishev	16	17
(Spain) J Laviña	13	17
11	(Switzerland) O Colin	21	21
(Finland) I Kokko	12	11
3	(Denmark) A Boesen	21	21

Third Round
10	(Thailand) N Chuaymak	21	21
(France) X Engrand	4	8
11	(Switzerland) O Colin	8	16
3	(Denmark) A Boesen	21	21

Quarterfinals
10	(Thailand) N Chuaymak	10	10
3	(Denmark) A Boesen	21	21

==== Section 4 ====
First Round
(Finland) M Nissinen	21	11	11
(Canada) É Montpetit	17	21	21
(Poland) J Orzol	1	5
12	(Indonesia) J Rosobin	21	21
(Iceland) S Strom	13	8
(Germany) A Lindner	21	21
(Portugal) P Gomes	6	20
5	(France) T Blondeau	21	22
(Netherlands) R Rouwhorst	21	21
(Japan) T Eishi	10	19
(Spain) F Herrero	10	2
15	(Denmark) A Borella	21	21
(Sweden) R Wettersten	29	24	19
(England) C Dow	30	22	21
(Austria) G Walter	2	3
2	(Russia) S Pukhov	21	21

Second Round
(Canada) É Montpetit	5	7
12	(Indonesia) J Rosobin	21	21'
(Germany) A Lindner	17	15
5	(France) T Blondeau	21	21
(Netherlands) R Rouwhorst	15	17
15	(Denmark) A Borella	21	21
(England) C Dow	3	14
2	(Russia) S Pukhov	21	21

Third Round
12	(Indonesia) J Rosobin	21	21
5	(France) T Blondeau	9	14
15	(Denmark) A Borella	17	10
2	(Russia) S Pukhov	21	21

Quarterfinals
12	(Indonesia) J Rosobin	15	15
2	(Russia) S Pukhov	21	21

== Women's singles ==
=== Seeds ===
1. (Germany) Claudia Vogelgsang (semifinals, bronze medal)
2. (England) Rebecca Pantaney (champion, gold medal)
3. (France) Aurélie Martin (third round)
4. (Japan) Noriko Sanada (semifinals, bronze medal)
5. (Denmark) Ingrid Marie Holst Olsen (second round)
6. (Sweden) Katja Wengberg (third round)
7. (Germany) Katrin Hockemeyer (second round)
8. (Japan) Kazumi Ichinohe (quarterfinals)

=== Finals ===
Semifinals
1	(Germany) Claudia Vogelgsang	11	13
(Japan) Mayumi Bando	21	21
4	(Japan) Noriko Sanada	21	17	14
2	(England) Rebecca Pantaney	19	21	21

Final
(Japan) Mayumi Bando	8	15
2	(England) Rebecca Pantaney	21	21

=== Top half ===
==== Section 1 ====
First Round
(India) D Ganapathy	17	11
(France) J Puigrenier	21	21

Second Round
1	(Germany) C Vogelgsang	21	21
(Russia) T Ianutc	3	8
(Hungary) V Molnár	19	17
(Denmark) B Kastrup	21	21
8	(Japan) K Ichinohe	21	20	21
(Sweden) A Häggman	14	22	6
(Poland) M Średnicka	11	16
(France) J Puigrenier	21	21

Third Round
1	(Germany) C Vogelgsang	21	21
(Denmark) B Kastrup	8	6
8	(Japan) K Ichinohe	21	21
(France) J Puigrenier	8	9

Quarterfinals
1	(Germany) C Vogelgsang	21	21
8	(Japan) K Ichinohe	15	8

==== Section 2 ====
First Round
(Japan) M Bando	21	21
(Sweden) L Haggman	13	13

Second Round
3	(France) A Martin	w	/	o
(Poland) M Kojder
(Canada) A Poon	21	21
(Finland) M Sorokin	12	19
5	(Denmark) I M H Olsen	19	21	15
(Germany) M Nowak	21	10	21
(India) P Joshi	10	10
(Japan) M Bando	21	21

Third Round
3	(France) A Martin	21	17
(Canada) A Poon	23	21
(Germany) M Nowak	14	9
(Japan) M Bando	21	21

Quarterfinals
(Canada) A Poon	11	14
(Japan) M Bando	21	21

=== Bottom half ===
==== Section 3 ====
First Round
(Poland) J Słomka	8	9
(France) A-G Depagne	21	21

Second Round
(France) A-G Depagne	21	21
(Russia) L Marahova	14	17
(India) U R Palit	21	18	21
7	(Germany) K Hockemeyer	15	21	16
(Switzerland) D Flepp	21	18	21
(Finland) A-M Kallio	9	21	14
(Sweden) S Fändriks Rehnström	18	10
4	(Japan) N Sanada	21	21

Third Round
(France) A-G Depagne	'21	21
(India) U R Palit	9	15
(Switzerland) D Flepp	9	3
4	(Japan) N Sanada	21	21

Quarterfinals
(France) A-G Depagne	14	11
4	(Japan) N Sanada	21	21

==== Section 4 ====
First Round
(Denmark) L T. Haagensen	21	16	8
(Norway) H Abusdal	18	21	21

Second Round
(Norway) H Abusdal	18	21	21
(Russia) N Blokhina	21	10	13
(Germany) M Haupt	17	21	17
6	(Sweden) K Wengberg	21	18	21
(Japan) K Nakashima	21	21
(Austria) U Edelmüller	9	13
(India) N B Prakash	7	12
2	(England) R Pantaney	21	21

Third Round
(Norway) H Abusdal	21	21
6	(Sweden) K Wengberg	11	16
(Japan) K Nakashima	14	13
2	(England) R Pantaney	21	21

Quarterfinals
(Norway) H Abusdal	19	16
2	(England) R Pantaney	21	21

== Men's doubles ==
=== Seeds ===
1. (United States) Tony Gunawan / (Indonesia) Flandy Limpele (champions, gold medal)
2. (France) Xavier Engrand / Jérôme Krawczyk (third round)
3. (Denmark) Anders Boesen / Andreas Borella (semifinals, bronze medal)
4. (Sweden) Fredrik du Hane / (Denmark) Lars Klintrup (second round)
5. (Russia) Andrey Degtyarev / Vadim Itckov (quarterfinals)
6. (Germany) Jan-Lennard Hay / Ingo Waltermann (third round)
7. (Japan) Honzawa Yutaka / Matsumoto Masayuki (third round)
8. (England) Daniel Plant / Philip Troke (second round)

=== Finals ===
Semifinals
1	(United States) Tony Gunawan (Indonesia) Flandy Limpele	21	21
3	(Denmark) Anders Boesen (Denmark) Andreas Borella	10	10
(Netherlands) Gerben Bruijstens (Netherlands) Tjitte Weistra	18	18
(Thailand) Naruenart Chuaymak (Thailand) Apichai Thiraratsakul	21	21

Final
1	(United States) Tony Gunawan (Indonesia) Flandy Limpele	21	21
(Thailand) Naruenart Chuaymak (Thailand) Apichai Thiraratsakul	13	9

=== Top half ===
==== Section 1 ====
First Round
(Poland) K Maślanka (Poland) Z Serwetnicki	13	17
SUB	(Germany) T Hukriede (Netherlands) E Tan	21	21
(Germany) A Schulz (Germany) H Zanssen	19	23
(France) C Bernier (France) E Wasylyk	21	25
SUB	(Sweden) F Bohlin (Sweden) M Jansson	21	21
(Austria) N Schneider (Austria) G Walter	7	3

Second Round
1	(United States) T Gunawan (Indonesia) F Limpele	21	21
(England) C Dow (England) R Kapoor	9	19
(India) J T. Antony (India) J Xavier	15	21	15
SUB	(Germany) T Hukriede (Netherlands) E Tan	21	16	21
7	(Japan) H Yutaka (Japan) M Masayuki	21	21
(France) C Bernier (France) E Wasylyk	15	13
(Denmark) K Ødum (Denmark) T Sørensen	21	21
SUB	(Sweden) F Bohlin (Sweden) M Jansson	10	10

Third Round
1	(United States) T Gunawan (Indonesia) F Limpele	21	21
SUB	(Germany) T Hukriede (Netherlands) E Tan	10	15
7	(Japan) H Yutaka (Japan) M Masayuki	13	13
(Denmark) K Ødum (Denmark) T Sørensen	21	21

Quarterfinals
1	(United States) T Gunawan (Indonesia) F Limpele	21	21
(Denmark) K Ødum (Denmark) T Sørensen	16	13

==== Section 2 ====
First Round
(Hungary) T Gebhard (Hungary) K Horváth	21	21
(India) S Bhansali (India) A K Dhagat	8	10
(Canada) É Montpetit (Canada) S Proteau	21	21
(Malaysia) Lee C W (Malaysia) Tan T H	16	12
(England) D Bates (England) M Trebble	21	21
(Spain) F Herrero (England) B A. Richards	12	14
(Netherlands) R Rouwhorst (Netherlands) A van Gent	21	21
(Spain) A Caballero (Spain) J Laaviña	10	14

Second Round
3	(Denmark) A Boesen (Denmark) A Borella	21	21
(Hungary) T Gebhard (Hungary) K Horváth	15	10
(France) T Blondeau (France) O Dieu	25	21	21
(Canada) É Montpetit (Canada) S Proteau	27	8	15
5	(Russia) A Degtyarev (Russia) V Itckov	21	21
(England) D Bates (England) M Trebble	11	7
(Iceland) I Björnsson (Iceland) S Strom	11	11
(Netherlands) R Rouwhorst (Netherlands) A van Gent	21	21

Third Round
3	(Denmark) A Boesen (Denmark) A Borella	21	21
(France) T Blondeau (France) O Dieu	14	12
5	(Russia) A Degtyarev (Russia) V Itckov	21	14	21
(Netherlands) R Rouwhorst (Netherlands) A van Gent	12	21	8

Quarterfinals
3	(Denmark) A Boesen (Denmark) A Borella	16	21	21
5	(Russia) A Degtyarev (Russia) V Itckov	21	9	11

=== Bottom half ===
==== Section 3 ====
First Round
(Japan) N Tsutomu (Japan) T Eishi	21	21
(Austria) C Horejš-Kainrath (Austria) W Kammel	9	5
(India) S Abbasi (India) S Bakshi	20	19
(Netherlands) G Bruijstens (Netherlands) T Weistra	22	21
(Sweden) R Nilsson (Sweden) T Stendahl	15	21	21
(Poland) A Cimosz (Poland) P Pasik	21	14	16
(Germany) A Lindner (Germany) M Niesner	21	21
(Russia) S Igoshin (Russia) K Myakishev	19	16

Second Round
(Japan) N Tsutomu (Japan) T Eishi	19	21	17
(Denmark) F Johannsen (Sweden) J Olsson	21	10	21
(Netherlands) G Bruijstens (Netherlands) T Weistra	21	21
8	(England) D Plant (England) P Troke	19	15
(Sweden) R Nilsson (Sweden) T Stendahl	21	21	21
(Belgium) Y H Siu (Belgium) J Van den Brande	16	23	18
(Germany) A Lindner (Germany) M Niesner	21	21
4	(Sweden) F du Hane (Denmark) L Klintrup	11	18

Third Round
(Denmark) F Johannsen (Sweden) J Olsson	23	21	13
(Netherlands) G Bruijstens (Netherlands) T Weistra	25	19	21
(Sweden) R Nilsson (Sweden) T Stendahl	8	15
(Germany) A Lindner (Germany) M Niesner	21	21

Quarterfinals
(Netherlands) G Bruijstens (Netherlands) T Weistra	21	22
(Germany) A Lindner (Germany) M Niesner	15	20

==== Section 4 ====
First Round
(Iceland) N Ludvigsson (Iceland) T Nielsen	23	15	16
(Thailand) N Chuaymak (Thailand) A Thiraratsakul	21	21	21
(Norway) J R Anderson (Norway) E Lund	21	21
(Spain) R Jareño (Spain) J Waeyenbergh	7	4
' (Denmark) E B. Kæmpegaard (Denmark) M Rasmussen	21	21
(Sweden) N Kanebäck (Sweden) R Wettersten	15	11
(Indonesia) Inoki (Indonesia) V Wibowo	21	21
(Portugal) M Gloria (Portugal) P Gomes	13	1

Second Round
(Thailand) N Chuaymak (Thailand) A Thiraratsakul	21	16	21
(India) J. B. S. Vidyadhar (India) R Singh	11	21	15
(Norway) J R Anderson (Norway) E Lund	21	20	13
6	(Germany) J-L Hay (Germany) I Waltermann	14	22	21
(Denmark) E B. Kæmpegaard (Denmark) M Rasmussen	21	13	22
(Russia) A Katkov (Russia) S Pukhov	14	21	20
(Indonesia) Inoki (Indonesia) V Wibowo	19	12
2	(France) X Engrand (France) J Krawczyk	21	21

Third Round
(Thailand) N Chuaymak (Thailand) A Thiraratsakul	21	22
6	(Germany) J-L Hay (Germany) I Waltermann	11	20
(Denmark) E B. Kæmpegaard (Denmark) M Rasmussen	21	15	21
2	(France) X Engrand (France) J Krawczyk	18	21	16

Quarterfinals
(Thailand) N Chuaymak (Thailand) A Thiraratsakul	21	22
(Denmark) E B. Kæmpegaard (Denmark) M Rasmussen	11	20

== Women's doubles ==
=== Seeds ===
1. (England) Rebecca Pantaney / Lynne Swan (semifinals, bronze medal)
2. (Japan) Kazumi Ichinohe / Noriko Sanada (champions, gold medal)
3. (Russia) Svetlana Alferova / Maria Kurochkina (second round)
4. (Sweden) Sunniva Aminoff / (Germany) Claudia Vogelgsang (final, silver medal)
5. (Chinese Taipei) Chen Hua-wei / Chen Yu-fang (semifinals, bronze medal)
6. (Germany) Manuela Nowak / Simone Weisbarth (first round)
7. (Poland) Ewelina Bracha / Małgorzata Średnicka (first round)
8. (Ukraine) Natalija Holowkina / (Russia) Tatiana Ianutc (quarterfinals)

=== Finals ===
Semifinals
1	(England) Rebecca Pantaney (England) Lynne Swan	15	21	17
4	(Sweden) Sunniva Aminoff (Germany) Claudia Vogelgsang	21	8	21
5	(Chinese Taipei) Chen Hua-wei (Chinese Taipei) Chen Yu-fang	19	16
2	(Japan) Kazumi Ichinohe (Japan) Noriko Sanada	21	21

Final
4	(Sweden) Sunniva Aminoff (Germany) Claudia Vogelgsang	18	15
2	(Japan) Kazumi Ichinohe (Japan) Noriko Sanada	21	21

=== Top half ===
==== Section 1 ====
First Round
1	(England) R Pantaney (England) L Swan	21	14	21
(Japan) M Bando (Japan) K Nakashima	14	21	12
(India) P Joshi (France) A Lele	14	13
(France) C Gomes (France) L Goulin	21	21
6	(Germany) M Nowak (Germany) S Weisbarth	18	9
(Norway) H Abusdal (Russia) N Blokhina	21	21
(Sweden) D Harfman Bromee (Sweden) P Wareechol	19	21	19
(Denmark) P S. Dalkiær (Denmark) D K Larsen	21	13	21

Second Round
1	(England) R Pantaney (England) L Swan	21	21
(France) C Gomes (France) L Goulin	16	16
(Norway) H Abusdal (Russia) N Blokhina	21	21
(Denmark) P S. Dalkiær (Denmark) D K Larsen	1	8

Quarterfinals
1	(England) R Pantaney (England) L Swan	21	21
(Norway) H Abusdal (Russia) N Blokhina	11	17

==== Section 2 ====
First Round
4	(Sweden) S Aminoff (Germany) C Vogelgsang	21	21
(India) S Kotha (India) S P Settem	7	2
(Denmark) L Haarkjær (Denmark) B Kastrup	11	10
(Germany) T Kähler (Sweden) M-L Strömgren	21	21
7	(Poland) E Bracha (Poland) M Średnicka	14	5
(Russia) L Marahova (Russia) K Menkova	21	21
(Japan) A Matsuguma (Japan) R Matsumoto	21	22
(Iceland) V Ásgeirsdóttir (Iceland) E Nielsen	16	20

Second Round
4	(Sweden) S Aminoff (Germany) C Vogelgsang	21	19	21
(Germany) T Kähler (Sweden) M-L Strömgren	12	21	13
(Russia) L Marahova (Russia) K Menkova	12	14
(Japan) A Matsuguma (Japan) R Matsumoto	21	21

Quarterfinals
4	(Sweden) S Aminoff (Germany) C Vogelgsang	21	21
(Japan) A Matsuguma (Japan) R Matsumoto	15	17

=== Bottom half ===
==== Section 3 ====
First Round
(Sweden) A Häggman (Sweden) L Haggman	21	21
(Poland) A Białasiewicz (Poland) J Słomka	12	15
(Germany) M Haupt (Germany) K Hockemeyer	6	11
5	(Chinese Taipei) Chen H-w (Chinese Taipei) Chen Y-f	21	21
(India) H Kaverappa Kodandera (India) N Nallam	7	8
(Denmark) L T. Haagensen (Denmark) H Kæmpegaard	21	21
(France) A Martin (France) J Puigrenier	14	12
3	(Russia) S Alferova (Russia) M Kurochkina	21	21

Second Round
(Sweden) A Häggman (Sweden) L Haggman	5	4
5	(Chinese Taipei) Chen H-w (Chinese Taipei) Chen Y-f	21	21
(Denmark) L T. Haagensen (Denmark) H Kæmpegaard	21	15	21
3	(Russia) S Alferova (Russia) M Kurochkina	15	21	14

Quarterfinals
5	(Chinese Taipei) Chen H-w (Chinese Taipei) Chen Y-f	21	21
(Denmark) L T. Haagensen (Denmark) H Kæmpegaard	15	18

==== Section 4 ====
First Round
(Austria) U Edelmüller (Switzerland) D Flepp	14	15
(Germany) S Menne (Germany) K Schiermeier	21	21
(India) M Gyanchandani (India) U S Peddisetty	11	1
8	(Ukraine) N Holowkina (Russia) T Ianutc	21	21
(Finland) A-M Kallio (Finland) M Sorokin	9	13
(Sweden) L Hinders (Sweden) S Fändriks Rehnström	21	21
(Denmark) C Boesen (Denmark) I M H Olsen	21	21	19
2	(Japan) K Ichinohe (Japan) N Sanada	23	16	21

Second Round
(Germany) S Menne (Germany) K Schiermeier	18	18
8	(Ukraine) N Holowkina (Russia) T Ianutc	21	21
(Sweden) L Hinders (Sweden) S Fändriks Rehnström	9	4
2	(Japan) K Ichinohe (Japan) N Sanada	21	21

Quarterfinals
8	(Ukraine) N Holowkina (Russia) T Ianutc	13	21	10
2	(Japan) K Ichinohe (Japan) N Sanada	21	15	21

== Mixed doubles ==
=== Seeds ===
1. (Germany) Maurice Niesner / Claudia Vogelgsang (semifinals, bronze medal)
2. (England) Nick Ponting / Lynne Swan (quarterfinals)
3. (Germany) Thorsten Hukriede / Michaela Hukriede (final, silver medal)
4. (Russia) Stanislav Pukhov / Maria Kurochkina (third round)
5. (Russia) Vadim Itchkov / Natalia Blokhina (third round)
6. (Japan) Matsumoto Masayuki / Rie Matsumoto (quarterfinals)
7. (Netherlands) Roy Rouwhorst / Georgy Van Soerland-Trouerbach (quarterfinals)
8. (Denmark) Tommy Sørensen / Lisbeth T. Haagensen (champions, gold medal)

=== Finals ===
Semifinals
1	(Germany) Maurice Niesner (Germany) Claudia Vogelgsang	17	10
8	(Denmark) Tommy Sørensen (Denmark) Lisbeth T. Haagensen	21	21
3	(Germany) Thorsten Hukriede (Germany) Michaela Hukriede	13	21	21
(Japan) Takata Eishi (Japan) Noriko Sanada	21	12	16

Final
8	(Denmark) Tommy Sørensen (Denmark) Lisbeth T. Haagensen	21	21
3	(Germany) Thorsten Hukriede (Germany) Michaela Hukriede	17	12

=== Top half ===
==== Section 1 ====
First Round
(Sweden) J Olsson (Sweden) S Aminoff	20	18
(Denmark) N J Maltesen (Denmark) L Haarkjær	22	21
(Netherlands) A van Gent (Finland) M Sorokin	14	12
(Canada) E Nilsson (Canada) A Poon	21	21
(Poland) P Pasik (Poland) M Kojder
(Russia) A Degtyarev (Ukraine) N Golovkina	w	/	o
(Switzerland) O Colin (Switzerland) F Striebel	w	/	o
(Russia) A Monastyrev (Russia) L Marahova

Second Round
1	(Germany) M Niesner (Germany) C Vogelgsang	21	21
(Denmark) N J Maltesen (Denmark) L Haarkjær	11	18
(Japan) H Yutaka (Japan) A Matsuguma	8	20
(Canada) E Nilsson (Canada) A Poon	21	22
7	(Netherlands) R Rouwhorst (Netherlands) G Van Soerland-Trouerbach	21	21
(Russia) A Degtyarev (Ukraine) N Golovkina	8	18
(England) D Bates (England) S Hall	14	10
(Switzerland) O Colin (Switzerland) F Striebel	21	21

Third Round
1	(Germany) M Niesner (Germany) C Vogelgsang	21	19	21
(Canada) E Nilsson (Canada) A Poon	18	21	12
7	(Netherlands) R Rouwhorst (Netherlands) G Van Soerland-Trouerbach	21	21
(Switzerland) O Colin (Switzerland) F Striebel	10	15

Quarterfinals
1	(Germany) M Niesner (Germany) C Vogelgsang	23	21
7	(Netherlands) R Rouwhorst (Netherlands) G Van Soerland-Trouerbach	21	12

==== Section 2 ====
First Round
(Japan) N Tsutomu (Japan) C Tanifuji	15	15
(Sweden) N Kanebäck (Sweden) S Fändriks Rehnström	21	21
(Norway) J E Gulli (Norway) H Parnemann	6	8
(Germany) H Zanssen (Germany) T Kähler	21	21
(France) C Bernier (France) J Puigrenier	21	21
(Poland) K Grabek (Poland) M Średnicka	11	9
(Finland) J Rantanen (Finland) A-M Kallio	12	8
(Iceland) T Nielsen (Iceland) E Nielsen	21	21
(Austria) G Walter (Greece) G Vernardou	10	11
(India) M Ponnusamy (India) N Nallam	21	21

Second Round
4	(Russia) S Pukhov (Russia) M Kurochkina	21	21
(Sweden) N Kanebäck (Sweden) S Fändriks Rehnström	11	12
(England) P Troke (England) D Dawes	24	18
(Germany) H Zanssen (Germany) T Kähler	26	21
8	(Denmark) T Sørensen (Denmark) L T. Haagensen	21	21
(France) C Bernier (France) J Puigrenier	12	15
(Iceland) T Nielsen (Iceland) E Nielsen	21	21
(India) M Ponnusamy (India) N Nallam	6	10

Third Round
4	(Russia) S Pukhov (Russia) M Kurochkina	13	15
(Germany) H Zanssen (Germany) T Kähler	21	21
8	(Denmark) T Sørensen (Denmark) L T. Haagensen	21	21
(Iceland) T Nielsen (Iceland) E Nielsen	12	9

Quarterfinals
(Germany) H Zanssen (Germany) T Kähler	8	21	12
8	(Denmark) T Sørensen (Denmark) L T. Haagensen	21	19	21

=== Bottom half ===
==== Section 3 ====
First Round
(Portugal) M Gloria (Switzerland) D Flepp	21	21
(France) J Krawczyk (France) C Gomes	9	9
(Netherlands) T Weistra (New Zealand) D Rivera	21	14	21
(Norway) J R Andersen (Norway) H Abusdal	18	21	15
(India) S Velan (India) J Tessy	16	13
(Denmark) M Rasmussen (Denmark) H Bertelsen	21	21
(Sweden) T Stendhal (Sweden) P Wareechol	13	11
(Russia) S Igoshin (Russia) T Ianutc	21	21
(England) M Trebble (England) R Pantaney	21	21
(Spain) F Herrero (India) M Gyanchandani	8	7

Second Round
(Portugal) M Gloria (Switzerland) D Flepp	13	21
(Netherlands) T Weistra (New Zealand) D Rivera	21	23
(Denmark) M Rasmussen (Denmark) H Bertelsen	15	11
6	(Japan) M Masayuki (Japan) R Matsumoto	21	21
(Russia) S Igoshin (Russia) T Ianutc	21	21
(Austria) H Hochgatterer (Austria) U Edelmüller	11	14
(England) M Trebble (England) R Pantaney	19	13
3	(Germany) T Hukriede (Germany) M Hukriede	21	21

Third Round
(Netherlands) T Weistra (New Zealand) D Rivera	21	18	16
6	(Japan) M Masayuki (Japan) R Matsumoto	16	21	21
(Russia) S Igoshin (Russia) T Ianutc	12	15
3	(Germany) T Hukriede (Germany) M Hukriede	21	21

Quarterfinals
6	(Japan) M Masayuki (Japan) R Matsumoto	14	16
3	(Germany) T Hukriede (Germany) M Hukriede	21	21

==== Section 4 ====
First Round
(Iceland) S Ström (Iceland) V Ásgeirsdóttir	11	10
(Denmark) E B. Kæmpegaard (Denmark) H Kæmpengaard	21	21
SUB	(Sweden) U Svensson (Sweden) M-L Strömgren	14	11
(Japan) T Eishi (Japan) N Sanada	21	21
(Netherlands) E Tan (Netherlands) S Komala	21	21
(Spain) J Laviña (Spain) M J Almagro	16	10
(France) E Wasylyk (France) V Saugues	21	21
(Austria) C Horejš-Kainrath (Hungary) V Molnár	6	13
(Germany) A Lindner (Germany) M Nowak	21	21
(Poland) A Cimosz (Poland) J Słomka	14	17

Second Round
(Denmark) E B. Kæmpegaard (Denmark) H Kæmpengaard	11	19
(Japan) T Eishi (Japan) N Sanada	21	21
(Netherlands) E Tan (Netherlands) S Komala	9	16
5	(Russia) V Itckov (Russia) N Blokhina	21	21
(France) E Wasylyk (France) V Saugues	21	21
(Finland) T Smolander (Finland) P Rantavuori	14	12
(Germany) A Lindner (Germany) M Nowak	16	21
2	(England) N Ponting (England) L Swan	21	23

Third Round
(Japan) T Eishi (Japan) N Sanada	15	21	21
5	(Russia) V Itckov (Russia) N Blokhina	21	14	16
(France) E Wasylyk (France) V Saugues	14	14
2	(England) N Ponting (England) L Swan	21	21

Quarterfinals
(Japan) T Eishi (Japan) N Sanada	21	21
2	(England) N Ponting (England) L Swan	17	17
