= 2015 BWF World Senior Championships =

Tournament details
- Dates: August 9, 2015 – August 15, 2015
- Edition: 7th
- Level: International
- Competitors: 1301
- Venue: Helsingborg Arena
- Location: Helsingborg, Sweden

The 2015 BWF World Senior Championships is a badminton tournament which was held from 9 to 15 August at Helsingborg Arena in Helsingborg, Sweden.

== Medal summary ==
=== Medal table ===
* Host nation (Sweden)

Rank	Nation	Gold	Silver	Bronze	Total
1	Denmark	9	5	16	30
2	England	6	9	16	31
3	Germany	5	3.5	15	23.5
4	Indonesia	3.5	1	1.5	6
5	Chinese Taipei	3.5	1	1	5.5
6	Netherlands	2.5	1	2.5	6
7	Japan	2	8	8	18
8	Thailand	2	3	0	5
9	Russia	2	1	2	5
10	United States	1.5	0	0.5	2
11	Malaysia	1	0	1	2
12	South Africa	1	0	0	1
13	Scotland	0.5	1	0	1.5
14	Hong Kong	0.5	0	0	0.5
15	Sweden*	0	1.5	2.5	4
16	Hungary	0	1.5	2	3.5
17	Canada	0	1	1.5	2.5
18	Austria	0	1	1	2
19	India	0	1	0	1
20	Bulgaria	0	0.5	0	0.5
21	Finland	0	0	2	2
21	Iceland	0	0	2	2
23	Ireland	0	0	1.5	1.5
24	Australia	0	0	1	1
24	Norway	0	0	1	1
24	Poland	0	0	1	1
24	Portugal	0	0	1	1
Totals (27 entries)		40	40	80	160

=== Medalists ===
Event	Gold	Silver	Bronze
35+
Men's singles	(Russia) Stanislav Pukhov	(Germany) Thorsten Hurkriede	(Norway) Jim Ronny Andersen
Men's singles	(Russia) Stanislav Pukhov	(Germany) Thorsten Hurkriede	(Denmark) Anders Boesen
Women's singles	(England) Rebecca Pantaney	(Japan) Mayumi Bando	(Germany) Claudia Vogelgsang
Women's singles	(England) Rebecca Pantaney	(Japan) Mayumi Bando	(Japan) Noriko Sanada
Men's doubles	(United States) Tony Gunawan (Indonesia) Flandy Limpele	(Thailand) Naruenart Chuaymak (Thailand) Apichai Thiraratsakul	(Denmark) Anders Boesen (Denmark) Andreas Borella
Men's doubles	(United States) Tony Gunawan (Indonesia) Flandy Limpele	(Thailand) Naruenart Chuaymak (Thailand) Apichai Thiraratsakul	(Netherlands) Gerben Bruijstens (Netherlands) Tjitte Weistra
Women's doubles	(Japan) Kazumi Ichinohe (Japan) Noriko Sanada	(Sweden) Sunniva Aminoff (Germany) Claudia Vogelgsang	(England) Rebecca Pantaney (England) Lynne Swan
Women's doubles	(Japan) Kazumi Ichinohe (Japan) Noriko Sanada	(Sweden) Sunniva Aminoff (Germany) Claudia Vogelgsang	(Chinese Taipei) Chen Hua-wei (Chinese Taipei) Chen Yu-fang
Mixed doubles	(Denmark) Tommy Sørensen (Denmark) Lisebeth T. Haagensen	(Germany) Thorsten Hurkiede (Germany) Michaela Hukriede	(Germany) Maurice Niesner (Germany) Claudia Vogelgsang
Mixed doubles	(Denmark) Tommy Sørensen (Denmark) Lisebeth T. Haagensen	(Germany) Thorsten Hurkiede (Germany) Michaela Hukriede	(Japan) Takata Eishi (Japan) Noriko Sanada
40+
Men's singles	(Denmark) Peter Rasmussen	(Austria) Jürgen Koch	(Denmark) Gregers Schytt
Men's singles	(Denmark) Peter Rasmussen	(Austria) Jürgen Koch	(Portugal) Fernando Silva
Women's singles	(Netherlands) Georgy Van Soerland-Trouerbach	(Denmark) Pernille Strøm	(Netherlands) Marielle van der Woerdt
Women's singles	(Netherlands) Georgy Van Soerland-Trouerbach	(Denmark) Pernille Strøm	(Iceland) Elsa Nielsen
Men's doubles	(Indonesia) Heryanto Arbi (Indonesia) Tri Kusharjanto	(Denmark) Peter Rasmussen (Denmark) Thomas Stavngaard	(Indonesia) Dharma Gunawi (Austria) Jürgen Koch
Men's doubles	(Indonesia) Heryanto Arbi (Indonesia) Tri Kusharjanto	(Denmark) Peter Rasmussen (Denmark) Thomas Stavngaard	(England) Carl Jennings (England) Mark King
Women's doubles	(Russia) Natalja Gonchar (Russia) Olga Kuznetsova	(Hungary) Gondáné Fórián Csilla (Bulgaria) Reni Hassan	(England) Tracey Middleton (England) Joanne Muggeridge
Women's doubles	(Russia) Natalja Gonchar (Russia) Olga Kuznetsova	(Hungary) Gondáné Fórián Csilla (Bulgaria) Reni Hassan	(Germany) Michaela Hukriede (Germany) Stefanie Ruberg
Mixed doubles	(Denmark) Carsten Loesch (Denmark) Dorte Steenberg	(Sweden) Erik Sjöstedt (Sweden) Nilofar Mosavar Rahmani	(Russia) Vadim Nazarov (Russia) Olga Kuznetsova
Mixed doubles	(Denmark) Carsten Loesch (Denmark) Dorte Steenberg	(Sweden) Erik Sjöstedt (Sweden) Nilofar Mosavar Rahmani	(England) Carl Jennings (England) Joanne Muggeridge
45+
Men's singles	(Chinese Taipei) Wu Chang-jun	(Chinese Taipei) Liu En-horng	(Finland) Jyri Aalto
Men's singles	(Chinese Taipei) Wu Chang-jun	(Chinese Taipei) Liu En-horng	(Hungary) Tamas Gebhard
Women's singles	(Denmark) Gitte Sommer	(Hungary) Gondáné Fórián Csilla	(Poland) Dorota Grzejdak
Women's singles	(Denmark) Gitte Sommer	(Hungary) Gondáné Fórián Csilla	(England) Betty Blair
Men's doubles	(Chinese Taipei) Liu En-horng (Chinese Taipei) Wu Chang-jun	(Russia) Oleg Grigoryev (Russia) Vadim Nazarov	(Sweden) Patrik Bjorkler (Sweden) Stefan Edvardsson
Men's doubles	(Chinese Taipei) Liu En-horng (Chinese Taipei) Wu Chang-jun	(Russia) Oleg Grigoryev (Russia) Vadim Nazarov	(Indonesia) Tri Cahyo (Indonesia) Eddy Hartono
Women's doubles	(Denmark) Anne Birgtte Nielsen (Denmark) Gitte Sommer	(Japan) Mie Hanyu (Japan) Akiko Ueda	(Denmark) Gitte Andersen (Denmark) Helle Meincke
Women's doubles	(Denmark) Anne Birgtte Nielsen (Denmark) Gitte Sommer	(Japan) Mie Hanyu (Japan) Akiko Ueda	(Japan) Kumiko Kushiyama (Japan) Chika Tanifuji
Mixed doubles	(Denmark) Bo Sorensen (Denmark) Gitte Sommer	(Denmark) Jakob Østergaard (Denmark) Lenne Struwe Andersen	(Hungary) Tamas Gebhard (Hungary) Gondáné Fórián Csilla
Mixed doubles	(Denmark) Bo Sorensen (Denmark) Gitte Sommer	(Denmark) Jakob Østergaard (Denmark) Lenne Struwe Andersen	(England) Rajeev Bagga (England) Elizabeth Austin
50+
Men's singles	(Chinese Taipei) Chang Wen-sung	(Thailand) Narong Vanichitsarakul	(Denmark) Martin Qvist Olesen
Men's singles	(Chinese Taipei) Chang Wen-sung	(Thailand) Narong Vanichitsarakul	(Iceland) Broddi Kristjansson
Women's singles	(Denmark) Lone Hagelskjær Knudsen	(Netherlands) Jeannette Van Der Werff	(England) Cathy Bargh
Women's singles	(Denmark) Lone Hagelskjær Knudsen	(Netherlands) Jeannette Van Der Werff	(Germany) Ye Wang
Men's doubles	(Thailand) Surachai Makkasasithorn (Thailand) Narong Vanichitsarakul	(Indonesia) Karyanto Tan (Indonesia) Suganyanto Hadi Wahono	(Denmark) Morten Christiensen (Denmark) Martin Qvist Olesen
Men's doubles	(Thailand) Surachai Makkasasithorn (Thailand) Narong Vanichitsarakul	(Indonesia) Karyanto Tan (Indonesia) Suganyanto Hadi Wahono	(Denmark) Jan Soelyst (Denmark) Martin Vissing
Women's doubles	(Denmark) Charlotte Dew-Hattens (Denmark) Grete Sahlertz Kragekjær	(England) Cathy Bargh (England) Kay Vickers	(Denmark) Helle Buch (Denmark) Lone Hagelskjær Knudsen
Women's doubles	(Denmark) Charlotte Dew-Hattens (Denmark) Grete Sahlertz Kragekjær	(England) Cathy Bargh (England) Kay Vickers	(Republic of Ireland) Pamela Peard (Republic of Ireland) Sian Williams
Mixed doubles	(Chinese Taipei) Chang Wen-sung (Hong Kong) Zhou Xin	(Denmark) Morten Christiensen (Denmark) Helle Sjorring	(Denmark) Jan Soelyst (Denmark) Helle Buch
Mixed doubles	(Chinese Taipei) Chang Wen-sung (Hong Kong) Zhou Xin	(Denmark) Morten Christiensen (Denmark) Helle Sjorring	(Sweden) Magnus Nytell (Netherlands) Grace Kakiay
55+
Men's singles	(Indonesia) Hastomo Arbi	(Canada) Jack Keith Priestman	(Japan) Seiji Eto
Men's singles	(Indonesia) Hastomo Arbi	(Canada) Jack Keith Priestman	(Australia) Loke Poh Wong
Women's singles	(Germany) Heidi Bender	(England) Linda Wood	(Japan) Kuniko Yamamoto
Women's singles	(Germany) Heidi Bender	(England) Linda Wood	(England) Janet Walker
Men's doubles	(Indonesia) Uun Setiawan Santoso (Indonesia) Simbarsono Sutanto	(Thailand) Triring Limsakul (Thailand) Attakorn Maensamut	(Denmark) Bo Elvers (Denmark) Thomas S. Nielsen
Men's doubles	(Indonesia) Uun Setiawan Santoso (Indonesia) Simbarsono Sutanto	(Thailand) Triring Limsakul (Thailand) Attakorn Maensamut	(Canada) Jack Keith Priestman (United States) Geoffrey Stensland
Women's doubles	(Germany) Heidi Bender (Germany) Maren Schröder	(England) Jennifer A. Cox (England) Christine M. Crossley	(Denmark) Hanne Adsboel (Denmark) Anette Vollertzen
Women's doubles	(Germany) Heidi Bender (Germany) Maren Schröder	(England) Jennifer A. Cox (England) Christine M. Crossley	(Japan) Kayoko Ueda (Japan) Kuniko Yamamoto
Mixed doubles	(Germany) Stefan Frey (Germany) Heidi Bender	(Japan) Toshiyuki Kamiya (Japan) Kuniko Yamamoto	(Denmark) Jesper Helledie (Denmark) Hanne Adsboel
Mixed doubles	(Germany) Stefan Frey (Germany) Heidi Bender	(Japan) Toshiyuki Kamiya (Japan) Kuniko Yamamoto	(England) Ian M. Purton (England) Christine M. Crossley
60+
Men's singles	(Denmark) Claus B. Andersen	(Japan) Toshio Kawaguchi	(Malaysia) Chan Wan Seong
Men's singles	(Denmark) Claus B. Andersen	(Japan) Toshio Kawaguchi	(Russia) Vladimir Koloskov
Women's singles	(England) Christine M. Crossley	(Scotland) Christine Black	(Canada) Siew Har Hong
Women's singles	(England) Christine M. Crossley	(Scotland) Christine Black	(Germany) Marie-Luise Schulta-Jansen
Men's doubles	(Thailand) Jiamsak Panitchaikul (Thailand) Surapong Suharitdumrong	(England) William Hamblett (England) Graham Holt	(Austria) Tariq Farooq (Republic of Ireland) Brian Mckee
Men's doubles	(Thailand) Jiamsak Panitchaikul (Thailand) Surapong Suharitdumrong	(England) William Hamblett (England) Graham Holt	(Denmark) Claus B. Andersen (Denmark) Jesper Helledie
Women's doubles	(Scotland) Christine Black (Netherlands) Marjan Ridder	(England) Marguerite Butt (England) Ann Hurst	(Germany) Angela Michalowsky (Germany) Marie-Luise Schulta-Jansen
Women's doubles	(Scotland) Christine Black (Netherlands) Marjan Ridder	(England) Marguerite Butt (England) Ann Hurst	(Denmark) Gitte Attle Rasmussen (Denmark) Rita Skovgaard
Mixed doubles	(Netherlands) Rob Ridder (Netherlands) Marjan Ridder	(England) Graham Holt (England) Ann Hurst	(England) Peter Emptage (England) Anne C. Bridge
Mixed doubles	(Netherlands) Rob Ridder (Netherlands) Marjan Ridder	(England) Graham Holt (England) Ann Hurst	(England) William Hamblett (England) Brenda Creasey
65+
Men's singles	(South Africa) Johan Croukamp	(Denmark) Per Dabelsteen	(Finland) Carl-Johan Nybergh
Men's singles	(South Africa) Johan Croukamp	(Denmark) Per Dabelsteen	(Germany) Gregor Bartmann
Women's singles	(United States) Rose Lei	(Japan) Yuriko Okemoto	(England) Susan Ely
Women's singles	(United States) Rose Lei	(Japan) Yuriko Okemoto	(Japan) Chizuko Oketani
Men's doubles	(England) Robert J. Bell (England) Royston V. Lord	(India) Vidya Bhashan Arora (India) Sushil Kumar Patet	(Denmark) Per Dabelsteen (Denmark) Steen Adam Kioerbo
Men's doubles	(England) Robert J. Bell (England) Royston V. Lord	(India) Vidya Bhashan Arora (India) Sushil Kumar Patet	(England) Rodney Forrest (England) Grahame L. Moscrop
Women's doubles	(Japan) Yoko Akiyama (Japan) Yasuko Kataito	(Japan) Sumiko Kaneko (Japan) Yuriko Okemoto	(England) Eileen M. Carley (England) Susan Ely
Women's doubles	(Japan) Yoko Akiyama (Japan) Yasuko Kataito	(Japan) Sumiko Kaneko (Japan) Yuriko Okemoto	(Sweden) Ewa Carlender (Sweden) Kathryn Ekengren Gartner
Mixed doubles	(England) Royston V. Lord (England) Eileen M. Carley	(England) Robert J. Bell (England) Penelope A. Shears	(Germany) Hans-Joachim Pothmann (Germany) Monika Regineri
Mixed doubles	(England) Royston V. Lord (England) Eileen M. Carley	(England) Robert J. Bell (England) Penelope A. Shears	(Germany) Dieter Prax (Germany) Brigitte Prax
70+
Men's singles	(Germany) Joachim Schimpke	(Germany) Gerd Pigola	(Germany) Hans Schumacher
Men's singles	(Germany) Joachim Schimpke	(Germany) Gerd Pigola	(Germany) Dietmar Unser
Women's singles	(Germany) Renate Gabriel	(England) Barbara Gibson	(Germany) Elvira Richter
Women's singles	(Germany) Renate Gabriel	(England) Barbara Gibson	(Japan) Satoko Nakamura
Men's doubles	(Malaysia) Ching Kon Kong (Malaysia) Loo Ah Hooi	(Japan) Akira Hirota (Japan) Shinjiro Matsuda	(Germany) Dietmar Unser (Germany) Helmut Wiegand
Men's doubles	(Malaysia) Ching Kon Kong (Malaysia) Loo Ah Hooi	(Japan) Akira Hirota (Japan) Shinjiro Matsuda	(Germany) Peter Gerth (Germany) Hans Schumacher
Women's doubles	(England) Beryl Goodall (England) Kathleen Jenner	(Japan) Satoko Nakamura (Japan) Sanae Uno	(England) Victoria Betts (England) Barbara Gibson
Women's doubles	(England) Beryl Goodall (England) Kathleen Jenner	(Japan) Satoko Nakamura (Japan) Sanae Uno	(Denmark) Kaya Garbrecht (Denmark) Grethe Steenberg
Mixed doubles	(England) Kenneth Tantum (England) Joanna Elson	(England) Roger Baldwin (England) Victoria Betts	(England) John Whalebone (England) Beryl Goodall
Mixed doubles	(England) Kenneth Tantum (England) Joanna Elson	(England) Roger Baldwin (England) Victoria Betts	(Germany) Hans Schumacher (Germany) Renate Gabriel

=== Players who won multiple medals ===
Rank	Player	1st place, gold medalist(s)	2nd place, silver medalist(s)	3rd place, bronze medalist(s)	Total
1	(Denmark) Gitte Sommer	3	0	0	3
1	(Germany) Heidi Bender	3	0	0	3
3	(Chinese Taipei) Chang Wen-sung	2	0	0	2
3	(Chinese Taipei) Wu Chang-jun	2	0	0	2
3	(England) Robert J. Bell	2	0	0	2
3	(England) Royston V. Lord	2	0	0	2
3	(Netherlands) Marjan Ridder	2	0	0	2
8	(England) Christine M. Crossley	1	1	1	3
9	(Chinese Taipei) Liu En-horng	1	1	0	2
9	(Scotland) Christine Black	1	1	0	2
9	(Thailand) Narong Vanichitsarakul	1	1	0	2
12	(Japan) Noriko Sanada	1	0	2	3
13	(Denmark) Claus B. Andersen	1	0	1	2
13	(Denmark) Lone Hagelskjær Knudsen	1	0	1	2
13	(England) Beryl Goodall	1	0	1	2
13	(England) Eileen M. Carley	1	0	1	2
13	(England) Rebecca Pantaney	1	0	1	2
13	(Russia) Olga Kuznetsova	1	0	1	2
19	(Hungary) Gondáné Fórián Csilla	0	2	1	3
20	(England) Ann Hurst	0	2	0	2
20	(England) Graham Holt	0	2	0	2
20	(Japan) Yuriko Okemoto	0	2	0	2
23	(Germany) Claudia Vogelgsang	0	1	2	3
23	(Japan) Kuniko Yamamoto	0	1	2	3
25	(Austria) Jürgen Koch	0	1	1	2
25	(Canada) Jack Keith Priestman	0	1	1	2
25	(Denmark) Morten Christiensen	0	1	1	2
25	(Denmark) Per Dabelsteen	0	1	1	2
25	(England) Barbara Gibson	0	1	1	2
25	(England) Cathy Bargh	0	1	1	2
25	(England) Victoria Betts	0	1	1	2
25	(England) William Hamblett	0	1	1	2
25	(Germany) Michaela Hukriede	0	1	1	2
25	(Japan) Satoko Nakamura	0	1	1	2
35	(Germany) Hans Schumacher	0	0	3	3
36	(Denmark) Anders Boesen	0	0	2	2
36	(Denmark) Hanne Adsboel	0	0	2	2
36	(Denmark) Jan Soelyst	0	0	2	2
36	(Denmark) Jesper Helledie	0	0	2	2
36	(Denmark) Martin Qvist Olesen	0	0	2	2
36	(England) Carl Jennings	0	0	2	2
36	(England) Joanne Muggeridge	0	0	2	2
36	(England) Susan Ely	0	0	2	2
36	(Germany) Dietmar Unser	0	0	2	2
36	(Germany) Marie-Luise Schulta-Jansen	0	0	2	2
