= Anders Boesen =

Danish badminton player

Personal information
- Born: Anders Ploug Boesen; 6 March 1976 (age 50) Copenhagen, Denmark
- Height: 1.79 m (5 ft 10 in)

Sport
- Country: Denmark
- Sport: Badminton
- Handedness: Right

Men's singles
- Highest ranking: 3
- BWF profile
Medal record
Men's badminton
Representing Denmark
World Senior Championships
Bronze medal – third place	2015 Helsingborg	Men's singles 35+
Bronze medal – third place	2015 Helsingborg	Men's doubles 35+
Sudirman Cup
Bronze medal – third place	2001 Seville	Mixed team
Thomas Cup
Bronze medal – third place	2002 Guangzhou	Men's team
European Championships
Bronze medal – third place	2002 Malmö	Men's singles
Bronze medal – third place	2004 Geneva	Men's singles
European Mixed Team Championships
Gold medal – first place	2000 Glasgow	Mixed team
Gold medal – first place	2002 Malmö	Mixed team
Gold medal – first place	2004 Geneva	Mixed team

Anders Ploug Boesen (born 6 March 1976) is a former professional badminton player from Denmark. He has represented Denmark in international tournaments such as in World Championships, Sudirman Cup, Thomas Cup and European Championships.

Anders Boesen completed his medical studies in 2006, and later finished his surgical training subspecialized in arthroscopic surgery and sports traumatology at Department of Orthopedic Surgery, Copenhagen University Hospital, Amager-Hvidovre, in 2017. He now works as a sports doctor in F.C. Copenhagen together with his brother Morten Boesen who is also a Danish former badminton player.

== Achievements ==
=== World Senior Championships ===
Year	Venue	Event	Partner	Opponent	Score	Result
2015	Helsingborg Arena, Helsingborg, Sweden	Men's singles 35+	–	(Russia) Stanislav Pukhov	16–21, 18–21	Bronze
2015	Helsingborg Arena, Helsingborg, Sweden	Men's doubles 35+	(Denmark) Andreas Borella	(United States) Tony Gunawan (Indonesia) Flandy Limpele	10–21, 10–21	Bronze

=== European Championships ===
Men's singles
Year	Venue	Opponent	Score	Result
2004	Queue d’Arve Sport Center; Geneva, Switzerland	(Denmark) Peter Gade	6–15, 2–15	Bronze
2002	Baltiska hallen Malmö, Sweden	(Denmark) Peter Rasmussen	7–5, 5–7, 7–5, 4–7, 5–7	Bronze

=== IBF World Grand Prix ===
The World Badminton Grand Prix sanctioned by International Badminton Federation (IBF) from 1983 to 2006.

Men's singles
Year	Tournament	Opponent	Score	Result
2005	Thessaloniki World Grand Prix	(Denmark) Niels Christian Kaldau	15–9, 13–15, 8–15	(silver) Runner-up
2004	Dutch Open	(Denmark) Kenneth Jonassen	6–15, 6–15	(silver) Runner-up
2003	Swiss Open	(South Korea) Lee Hyun-il	10–15, 2–15	(silver) Runner-up
2000	U.S Open	(Indonesia) Ardy Wiranata	15–10, 1–15, 5–15	(silver) Runner-up

=== IBF International ===
Men's singles
Year	Tournament	Opponent	Score	Result
2005	Belgian International	(Germany) Björn Joppien	15–3, 15–6	(gold) Winner
1995	Hungarian International	(England) Anthony Bush	15–9, 15–1	(gold) Winner
1995	Czech International	(Denmark) Thomas Søgaard	4–15, 14–17	(silver) Runner-up
