= 2023 BWF World Senior Championships – 45+ =

Tournament details
- Dates: 11 September 2023 – 17 September 2023
- Edition: 11
- Level: International
- Competitors: 169 from 30 nations
- Venue: Hwasan Indoor Stadium; Jeonju Indoor Badminton Hall
- Location: Jeonju, South Korea

Champions
- Men's singles: (Japan) Hosemari Fujimoto
- Women's singles: (Netherlands) Georgy Trouerbach
- Men's doubles: (United States) Tony Gunawan (Indonesia) Tri Kusharjanto
- Women's doubles: (Sri Lanka) Chandrika de Silva (Germany) Claudia Vogelgsang
- Mixed doubles: (Denmark) Jesper Thomsen (Iceland) Drífa Harðardóttir

These are the results of 2023 BWF World Senior Championships' 45+ events.

== Competition schedule ==
Match was played as scheduled below.

#R	Preliminary rounds	QF	Quarter-finals	SF	Semi-finals	F	Finals

H	Hwasan Indoor Stadium	J	Jeonju Indoor Badminton Hall

Date	11 Sep		12 Sep		13 Sep		14 Sep		15 Sep	16 Sep	17 Sep
Venue	H	J	H	J	H	J	H	J	H	H	H
Men's singles		1R				2R	3R		QF	SF	F
Women's singles						1R	2R		QF	SF	F
Men's doubles		1R	2R			3R	QF			SF	F
Women's doubles			1R			2R	QF			SF	F
Mixed doubles		1R				2R	3R		QF	SF	F

== Medal summary ==
=== Medal standings ===
* Host nation (South Korea)

2023 BWF World Senior Championships medal table
Rank	Nation	Gold	Silver	Bronze	Total
1	Japan	1	2	1	4
2	Netherlands	1	0	1	2
3	Sri Lanka	0.5	1	0	1.5
4	Germany	0.5	0	1	1.5
5	Denmark	0.5	0	0.5	1
6	Iceland	0.5	0	0	0.5
6	Indonesia	0.5	0	0	0.5
6	United States	0.5	0	0	0.5
9	Thailand	0	1	2	3
10	India	0	1	0	1
11	Chinese Taipei	0	0	2	2
12	England	0	0	1	1
12	Switzerland	0	0	1	1
14	Norway	0	0	0.5	0.5
Totals (14 entries)		5	5	10	20

=== Medalists ===
Event	Gold	Silver	Bronze
Men's singles	(Japan) Hosemari Fujimoto	(India) C. M. Shashidhar	(Thailand) Naruenart Chuaymak
Men's singles	(Japan) Hosemari Fujimoto	(India) C. M. Shashidhar	(Switzerland) Conrad Hückstädt
Women's singles	(Netherlands) Georgy Trouerbach	(Sri Lanka) Chandrika de Silva	(Japan) Mayumi Fukasawa
Women's singles	(Netherlands) Georgy Trouerbach	(Sri Lanka) Chandrika de Silva	(England) Rebecca Pantaney
Men's doubles	(United States) Tony Gunawan (Indonesia) Tri Kusharjanto	(Thailand) Naruenart Chuaymak (Thailand) Thaweesak Koetsriphan	(Thailand) Visava Pimsamarn (Thailand) Nuttawut Sroidokson
Men's doubles	(United States) Tony Gunawan (Indonesia) Tri Kusharjanto	(Thailand) Naruenart Chuaymak (Thailand) Thaweesak Koetsriphan	(Norway) Jim Ronny Andersen (Denmark) Jesper Thomsen
Women's doubles	(Sri Lanka) Chandrika de Silva (Germany) Claudia Vogelgsang	(Japan) Maki Jin (Japan) Mikiko Shimada	(Netherlands) Georgy Trouerbach (Netherlands) Mariëlle van der Woerdt
Women's doubles	(Sri Lanka) Chandrika de Silva (Germany) Claudia Vogelgsang	(Japan) Maki Jin (Japan) Mikiko Shimada	(Chinese Taipei) Kao Shin-li (Chinese Taipei) Shyu Yuh-ling
Mixed doubles	(Denmark) Jesper Thomsen (Iceland) Drífa Harðardóttir	(Japan) Hosemari Fujimoto (Japan) Tomoko Hinoishi	(Chinese Taipei) Feng Hung-yun (Chinese Taipei) Kao Shin-li
Mixed doubles	(Denmark) Jesper Thomsen (Iceland) Drífa Harðardóttir	(Japan) Hosemari Fujimoto (Japan) Tomoko Hinoishi	(Germany) Björn Wippich (Germany) Jessica Willems

== Men's singles ==
=== Seeds ===
1. (Thailand) Naruenart Chuaymak (semi-finals; bronze medalist)
2. (Switzerland) Conrad Hückstädt (semi-finals; bronze medalist)
3. (Japan) Hosemari Fujimoto (champion; gold medalist)
4. (England) Kenton Jones (second round)
5. (Hong Kong) Chan Tsz Kin (second round)
6. (Indonesia) Jhony Hidayat (quarter-finals)
7. (Denmark) Henrik Pøhler (third round)
8. (Germany) Björn Wippich (quarter-finals)

=== Finals ===
Semi-finals
1	(Thailand) Naruenart Chuaymak	18	11
3/4	(Japan) Hosemari Fujimoto	21	21
(India) C. M. Shashidhar	20	21	0
2	(Switzerland) Conrad Hückstädt	22	13	0^{r}

Final
3/4	(Japan) Hosemari Fujimoto	21	21
(India) C. M. Shashidhar	10	13

=== Top half ===
==== Section 1 ====
First round
(Chinese Taipei) Liu Y-h	17	21	21
(England) P Troke	21	17	14
(India) J T. Antony	21	21
(South Korea) Jo Y-i	10	5
(Sweden) M Thor	11	12
(Switzerland) J Grape	21	21
(Netherlands) R Baedi	12	8
(Germany) P Muhl	21	21
(Japan) Y Kurita	21	21
(Poland) L Wild	6	7

Second round
1	(Thailand) N Chuaymak	21	21
(Chinese Taipei) Liu Y-h	12	10
(Sri Lanka) M S Fernando	21	12	21
(India) J T. Antony	12	21	19
5/8	(Indonesia) J Hidayat	21	21
(Switzerland) J Grape	13	13
(Germany) P Muhl	21	21
(Japan) Y Kurita	16	18

Third round
1	(Thailand) N Chuaymak	21	21
(Sri Lanka) M S Fernando	9	11
5/8	(Indonesia) J Hidayat	21	17	21
(Germany) P Muhl	10	21	10

Quarter-finals
1	(Thailand) N Chuaymak	21	21
5/8	(Indonesia) J Hidayat	10	15

==== Section 2 ====
First round
(South Korea) Jeong Y-h	16	15
(Romania) B Catargiu	21	21
(Sri Lanka) S Thalwattegedara	21	21
(Spain) S Martínez	17	17
(United Arab Emirates) S Kumar	15	8
(France) J Mével	21	21
(Sweden) F Ingemansson	13	12
(India) L Yadav	21	21
(England) O Smith	18	9
(United States) A Mishra	21	21

Second round
3/4	(Japan) H Fujimoto	21	21
(Romania) B Catargiu	7	4
(Germany) M Hillbrandt	21	21
(Sri Lanka) S Thalwattegedara	18	15
5/8	(Denmark) H Pøhler	21	21
(France) J Mével	16	14
(India) L Yadav	21	21
(United States) A Mishra	15	18

Third round
3/4	(Japan) H Fujimoto	21	21
(Germany) M Hillbrandt	14	11
5/8	(Denmark) H Pøhler	21	25	18
(India) L Yadav	12	27	21

Quarter-finals
3/4	(Japan) H Fujimoto	21	21
(India) L Yadav	3	13

=== Bottom half ===
==== Section 3 ====
First round
(Chinese Taipei) Feng H-y	21	21
(Thailand) P Imkaew	17	15
(Sweden) M Bachtiar	14	21	22
(Canada) A Seaboyer	21	18	20
(South Korea) Kim Y-s	6	2
(Japan) Y Kuruma	21	21
(Sri Lanka) M Perera	8	5
(Denmark) L Klintrup	21	21
(United Arab Emirates) R Ramakrishnan	21	21
(Belgium) J Van den Brande	7	15
(India) C. M. Shashidhar	21	21
(Germany) D Fischer	5	5

Second round
(Chinese Taipei) Feng H-y	21	21
(Sweden) M Bachtiar	10	10
(Japan) Y Kuruma	21	21
5/8	(Hong Kong) Chan T K	15	8
(Denmark) L Klintrup	21	21
(United Arab Emirates) R Ramakrishnan	13	5
(India) C. M. Shashidhar	21	21
3/4	(England) K Jones	13	17

Third round
(Chinese Taipei) Feng H-y	21	21
(Japan) Y Kuruma	17	11
(Denmark) L Klintrup	18	16
(India) C. M. Shashidhar	21	21

Quarter-finals
(Chinese Taipei) Feng H-y	14	10
(India) C. M. Shashidhar	21	21

==== Section 4 ====
First round
(South Korea) Yang S-h	11	5
(India) A Kumar	21	21
(Netherlands) S Tjoa	21	21
(Sweden) K Drake	16	13
(Japan) Y Saitou	21	21
(Malaysia) V Loh	13	19
(England) A Overy	21	21
(Sri Lanka) S Wickramasinghe	11	16
(United Arab Emirates) S Choori	22	16	18
(Scotland) R Campbell	20	21	21

Second round
(India) A Kumar	26	21
(Netherlands) S Tjoa	24	18
(Japan) Y Saitou	17	16
5/8	(Germany) B Wippich	21	21
(England) A Overy	19	18
(France) P Lepage	21	21
(Scotland) R Campbell	2	4
2	(Switzerland) C Hückstädt	21	21

Third round
(India) A Kumar	10	9
5/8	(Germany) B Wippich	21	21
(France) P Lepage	5	5
2	(Switzerland) C Hückstädt	21	21

Quarter-finals
5/8	(Germany) B Wippich	12	7
2	(Switzerland) C Hückstädt	21	21

== Women's singles ==
=== Seeds ===
1. (Netherlands) Georgy Trouerbach (champion; gold medalist)
2. (England) Rebecca Pantaney (semi-finals; bronze medalist)
3. (Sri Lanka) Chandrika de Silva (final; silver medalist)
4. (Germany) Claudia Vogelgsang (second round)

=== Finals ===
Semi-finals
1	(Netherlands) Georgy Trouerbach	21	21
(Japan) Mayumi Fukasawa	16	17
3/4	(Sri Lanka) Chandrika de Silva	23	20	21
2	(England) Rebecca Pantaney	21	22	18

Final
1	(Netherlands) Georgy Trouerbach	21	21
3/4	(Sri Lanka) Chandrika de Silva	14	13

=== Top half ===
==== Section 1 ====
First round
(India) P Mehta	21	21
(South Korea) Gu I-s	3	5
(Finland) E Heikkinen	w	/	o
(Sweden) A Stenmark

Second round
1	(Netherlands) G Trouerbach	21	21
(India) P Mehta	11	17
(Japan) M Jin	21	21
(Finland) E Heikkinen	16	10

Quarter-finals
1	(Netherlands) G Trouerbach	21	21
(Japan) M Jin	9	14

==== Section 2 ====
First round
(Denmark) B Pedersen	16	13
(Japan) M Fukasawa	21	21
(Indonesia) E Tjandra	16	13
(India) Y Shaikh	21	21

Second round
3/4	(Germany) C Vogelgsang	16	16
(Japan) M Fukasawa	21	21
(England) M Rossil	8	12
(India) Y Shaikh	21	21

Quarter-finals
(Japan) M Fukasawa	22	21
(India) Y Shaikh	20	9

=== Bottom half ===
==== Section 3 ====
First round
(Germany) K Kubitza	8	15
(India) S Chakrabarty	21	21
(Switzerland) F Striebel	17	21	21
(South Korea) Bang H-j	21	18	12

Second round
(India) S Chakrabarty	21	17	18
(Japan) M Shimada	17	21	21
(Switzerland) F Striebel	8	13
3/4	(Sri Lanka) C de Silva	21	21

Quarter-finals
(Japan) M Shimada	13	19
3/4	(Sri Lanka) C de Silva	21	21

==== Section 4 ====
First round
(Chinese Taipei) Lin T-h	13	6
(Japan) S Tamura	21	21
(Germany) S Pietz	13	20
(India) B Baruah	21	22

Second round
(Japan) S Tamura	21	21
(Romania) A M Popa	16	18
(India) B Baruah	10	19
2	(England) R Pantaney	21	21

Quarter-finals
(Japan) S Tamura	14	16
2	(England) R Pantaney	21	21

== Men's doubles ==
=== Seeds ===
1. (India) Samir Abbasi / Vijay Lancy Mascarenhas (subtitued Samir Abbasi for K. A. Aneesh; second round)
2. (United States) Tony Gunawan / (Indonesia) Tri Kusharjanto (champions; gold medalists)
3. (England) Kenton Jones / Chris Spice (third round)
4. (Norway) Jim Ronny Andersen / (Denmark) Jesper Thomsen (semi-finals; bronze medalists)
5. (Scotland) Ross Campbell / Frazer Mcculloch (quarter-finals)
6. (Germany) David Fischer / Patrick Muhl (third round)
7. (Thailand) Phongthep Imkaew / Worapoj Somchariya (quarter-finals)
8. (Denmark) Lars Klintrup / (Germany) Björn Wippich (quarter-finals)

=== Finals ===
Semi-finals
(Thailand) Naruenart Chuaymak (Thailand) Thaweesak Koetsriphan	w	/	o
(Thailand) Visava Pimsamarn (Thailand) Nuttawut Sroidokson
3/4	(Norway) Jim Ronny Andersen (Denmark) Jesper Thomsen
2	(United States) Tony Gunawan (Indonesia) Tri Kusharjanto	w	/	o

Final
(Thailand) Naruenart Chuaymak (Thailand) Thaweesak Koetsriphan	14	13
2	(United States) Tony Gunawan (Indonesia) Tri Kusharjanto	21	21

=== Top half ===
==== Section 1 ====
First round

Second round
1 SUB	(India) S Abbasi (India) V L Mascarenhas	13	15
(Thailand) N Chuaymak (Thailand) T Koetsriphan	21	21
(Poland) A Grzechnik (Poland) L Wild	12	9
(South Korea) Choi G-i (South Korea) Sung H-k	21	21
5/8	(Scotland) R Campbell (Scotland) F Mcculloch	21	21
(Sri Lanka) M S Fernando (Sri Lanka) S Pradeep	19	12
(Japan) Y Kurita (Japan) K Suzuki	18	19
(United Arab Emirates) B Haryadi (United Arab Emirates) T Thomas	21	21

Third round
(Thailand) N Chuaymak (Thailand) T Koetsriphan	21	21
(South Korea) Choi G-i (South Korea) Sung H-k	10	16
5/8	(Scotland) R Campbell (Scotland) F Mcculloch	21	21
(United Arab Emirates) B Haryadi (United Arab Emirates) T Thomas	12	19

Quarter-finals
1	(Thailand) N Chuaymak (Thailand) T Koetsriphan	21	21
5/8	(Scotland) R Campbell (Scotland) F Mcculloch	9	13

==== Section 2 ====
First round
(Chinese Taipei) Chen S-c (Chinese Taipei) Huang Y-f	12	17
(India) S K Dasari (India) S V J Padala	21	21

Second round
3/4	(England) K Jones (England) C Spice	14	21	21
(United Arab Emirates) S Poyyathara (United Arab Emirates) R Ramakrishnan	21	18	16
(Thailand) V Pimsamarn (Thailand) N Sroidokson	21	21
(Sri Lanka) M Perera (Sri Lanka) S Wickramasinghe	11	7
5/8	(Germany) D Fischer (Germany) P Muhl	21	20	21
(Belgium) Y H Siu (Belgium) J Van den Brande	17	22	17
(South Korea) Kim S-y (South Korea) Park S-h	7	10
(India) S K Dasari (India) S V J Padala	21	21

Third round
3/4	(England) K Jones (England) C Spice	18	16
(Thailand) V Pimsamarn (Thailand) N Sroidokson	21	21
5/8	(Germany) D Fischer (Germany) P Muhl	11	16
(India) S K Dasari (India) S V J Padala	21	21

Quarter-finals
(Thailand) V Pimsamarn (Thailand) N Sroidokson	21	18	21
(India) S K Dasari (India) S V J Padala	10	21	14

=== Bottom half ===
==== Section 3 ====
First round
(Malaysia) Kong C K (Malaysia) Won S K	21	21
(Japan) T Otsuka (Japan) Y Saitou	15	11

Second round
(Malaysia) Kong C K (Malaysia) Won S K	21	21
(Germany) M Hillbrandt (Denmark) H Pøhler	9	14
(Sri Lanka) D Nilushana (Sri Lanka) S Thalwattegedara	10	10
5/8	(Denmark) L Klintrup (Germany) B Wippich	21	21
(South Korea) Oh J-h (South Korea) Pyo Y-d	10	10
(India) A Khedikar (India) S Mohan	21	21
(United Arab Emirates) S Choori (United Arab Emirates) M Karthikeyan	8	9
3/4	(Norway) J R Andersen (Denmark) J Thomsen	21	21

Third round
(Malaysia) Kong C K (Malaysia) Won S K	21	11	19
5/8	(Denmark) L Klintrup (Germany) B Wippich	16	21	21
(India) A Khedikar (India) S Mohan	21	10	10
3/4	(Norway) J R Andersen (Denmark) J Thomsen	18	21	21

Quarter-finals
5/8	(Denmark) L Klintrup (Germany) B Wippich	9	21	12
3/4	(Norway) J R Andersen (Denmark) J Thomsen	21	19	21

==== Section 4 ====
First round

Second round
(Japan) H Arita (Japan) Y Kuruma	21	21
(Netherlands) R Baedi (Netherlands) S Tjoa	13	18
(England) A Overy (England) O Smith	10	10
5/8	(Thailand) P Imkaew (Thailand) W Somchariya	21	21
(Romania) B Catargiu (Bulgaria) M Chavdarov	17	11
SUB	(India) M Adhyaru (India) S Velan	21	21
(South Korea) Kim W-s (South Korea) Ryu S-n	8	10
2	(United States) T Gunawan (Indonesia) T Kusharjanto	21	21

Third round
(Japan) H Arita (Japan) Y Kuruma	21	17	17
5/8	(Thailand) P Imkaew (Thailand) W Somchariya	15	21	21
SUB	(India) M Adhyaru (India) S Velan	7	9
2	(United States) T Gunawan (Indonesia) T Kusharjanto	21	21

Quarter-finals
5/8	(Thailand) P Imkaew (Thailand) W Somchariya	8	7
2	(United States) T Gunawan (Indonesia) T Kusharjanto	21	21

== Women's doubles ==
=== Seeds ===
1. (Netherlands) Georgy Trouerbach / Mariëlle van der Woerdt (semi-finals; bronze medalists)
2. (Denmark) Janne Vang Nielsen / Birgitte Pedersen (quarter-finals)
3. (England) Rebecca Pantaney / Lynne Swan (quarter-finals)
4. (Sri Lanka) Chandrika de Silva / (Germany) Claudia Vogelgsang (champions; gold medalists)

=== Finals ===
Semi-finals
1	(Netherlands) Georgy Trouerbach (Netherlands) Mariëlle van der Woerdt	17	12
3/4	(Sri Lanka) Chandrika de Silva (Germany) Claudia Vogelgsang	21	21
(Chinese Taipei) Kao Shin-li (Chinese Taipei) Shyu Yuh-ling	15	17
(Japan) Maki Jin (Japan) Mikiko Shimada	21	21

Final
3/4	(Sri Lanka) Chandrika de Silva (Germany) Claudia Vogelgsang	21	21
(Japan) Maki Jin (Japan) Mikiko Shimada	7	7

=== Top half ===
==== Section 1 ====
First round
(Denmark) M Asmussen (Denmark) D Steenberg	21	21
(India) N Bangalore (India) P Sangani	7	15

Second round
1	(Netherlands) G Trouerbach (Netherlands) M van der Woerdt	21	21
(Finland) E Heikkinen (Sweden) P Wareechol	7	15
(Japan) R Takahashi (Japan) S Tamura	16	19
(Denmark) M Asmussen (Denmark) D Steenberg	21	21

Quarter-finals
1	(Netherlands) G Trouerbach (Netherlands) M van der Woerdt	21	17	21
(Denmark) M Asmussen (Denmark) D Steenberg	15	21	12

==== Section 2 ====
First round
(South Korea) Choi K-m (South Korea) Jeong J-h	19	13
(United Arab Emirates) M Bhandari (United Arab Emirates) T M Cherian	21	21
(Chinese Taipei) Chen P-y (Chinese Taipei) Lin T-h
(Japan) M Kusanagi (Japan) N Sanada	w	/	o

Second round
3/4	(Sri Lanka) C de Silva (Germany) C Vogelgsang	21	21
(United Arab Emirates) M Bhandari (United Arab Emirates) T M Cherian	8	11
(India) S Chakrabarty (India) P Joshi	11	15
(Japan) M Kusanagi (Japan) N Sanada	21	21

Quarter-finals
3/4	(Sri Lanka) C de Silva (Germany) C Vogelgsang	21	14	21
(Japan) M Kusanagi (Japan) N Sanada	14	21	17

=== Bottom half ===
==== Section 3 ====
First round
(Indonesia) I Gunarti (Indonesia) E Tjandra	21	21
(South Korea) Kang M-j (South Korea) Kim S-j	6	11
(Japan) T Hinoishi (Japan) M Murakami	21	21
(India) B Baruah (India) Y Shaikh	12	7

Second round
(Indonesia) I Gunarti (Indonesia) E Tjandra	21	8	15
(Chinese Taipei) Kao S-l (Chinese Taipei) Shyu Y-l	11	21	21
(Japan) T Hinoishi (Japan) M Murakami	17	21	15
3/4	(England) R Pantaney (England) L Swan	21	11	21

Quarter-finals
(Chinese Taipei) Kao S-l (Chinese Taipei) Shyu Y-l	21	23
3/4	(England) R Pantaney (England) L Swan	17	21

==== Section 4 ====
First round
(Japan) M Jin (Japan) M Shimada	21	21
(Germany) K Kubitza (Germany) S Pietz	12	8
(South Korea) Lee M-y (South Korea) Um J-y	3	2
(India) S Misra (India) S Rangaiah	21	21

Second round
(Japan) M Jin (Japan) M Shimada	21	21
(Australia) M Bader (Sri Lanka) W Yahatugoda	6	4
(India) S Misra (India) S Rangaiah	7	6
2	(Denmark) J V Nielsen (Denmark) B Pedersen	21	21

Quarter-finals
(Japan) M Jin (Japan) M Shimada	10	21	21
2	(Denmark) J V Nielsen (Denmark) B Pedersen	21	15	13

== Mixed doubles ==
=== Seeds ===
1. (Denmark) Jesper Thomsen / (Iceland) Drífa Harðardóttir (; medalists)
2. (India) Samir Abbasi / Pooja Mehta (quarter-finals)
3. (Netherlands) Ronny Baedi / Georgy Trouerbach (quarter-finals)
4. (England) Mark King / Lynne Swan (third round)
5. (Chinese Taipei) Feng Hung-yun / Kao Shin-li (semi-finals; bronze medalists)
6. (Japan) Hosemari Fujimoto / Tomoko Hinoishi (; medalists)
7. (Denmark) Henrik Pøhler / Majken Asmussen (third round)
8. (England) Chris Spice / Rebecca Pantaney (quarter-finals)

=== Finals ===
Semi-finals
1	(Denmark) Jesper Thomsen (Iceland) Drífa Harðardóttir	21	21
5/8	(Chinese Taipei) Feng Hung-yun (Chinese Taipei) Kao Shin-li	18	14
5/8	(Japan) Hosemari Fujimoto (Japan) Tomoko Hinoishi	21	30
(Germany) Björn Wippich (Germany) Jessica Willems	12	29

Final
1	(Denmark) Jesper Thomsen (Iceland) Drífa Harðardóttir	21	21
5/8	(Japan) Hosemari Fujimoto (Japan) Tomoko Hinoishi	18	11

=== Top half ===
==== Section 1 ====
First round
(India) D Saxena (India) S Jethwani	21	21
(Germany) D Fischer (Germany) S Pietz	13	7

Second round
1	(Denmark) J Thomsen (Iceland) D Harðardóttir	21	21
(Japan) T Otsuka (Japan) M Murakami	17	7
(United Arab Emirates) M Karthikeyan (United Arab Emirates) M Bhandari	21	21
(Spain) S Martínez (Spain) B Martín	9	7
5/8	(England) C Spice (England) R Pantaney	21	21
(South Korea) Cheon M-s (South Korea) Kim S-o	14	6
(Thailand) T Koetsriphan (Sweden) P Wareechol	21	21
(India) D Saxena (India) S Jethwani	16	8

Third round
1	(Denmark) J Thomsen (Iceland) D Harðardóttir	21	21
(United Arab Emirates) M Karthikeyan (United Arab Emirates) M Bhandari	11	16
5/8	(England) C Spice (England) R Pantaney	21	21
(Thailand) T Koetsriphan (Sweden) P Wareechol	18	14

Quarter-finals
1	(Denmark) J Thomsen (Iceland) D Harðardóttir	21	21
5/8	(England) C Spice (England) R Pantaney	12	12

==== Section 2 ====
First round
(Austria) R Hechenberger (Switzerland) F Striebel	21	11
(Thailand) Nu Sroidokson (Thailand) Na Sroidokson	23	21

Second round
3/4	(Netherlands) R Baedi (Netherlands) G Trouerbach	21	21
(Sri Lanka) S Wickramasinghe (Sri Lanka) W Yahatugoda	11	9
(Bulgaria) M Chavdarov (Romania) A M Popa	21	13	21
(England) A Overy (England) M Rossil	11	21	23
5/8	(Chinese Taipei) Feng H-y (Chinese Taipei) Kao S-l	21	21
(Japan) K Tsutsumi (Japan) M Kasai	10	11
(India) S Velan (India) B Baruah	20	25	21
(Thailand) Nu Sroidokson (Thailand) Na Sroidokson	22	23	10

Third round
3/4	(Netherlands) R Baedi (Netherlands) G Trouerbach	21	22
(England) A Overy (England) M Rossil	9	20
5/8	(Chinese Taipei) Feng H-y (Chinese Taipei) Kao S-l	21	21
(India) S Velan (India) B Baruah	13	10

Quarter-finals
3/4	(Netherlands) R Baedi (Netherlands) G Trouerbach	15	7
5/8	(Chinese Taipei) Feng H-y (Chinese Taipei) Kao S-l	21	21

=== Bottom half ===
==== Section 3 ====
First round
(Sweden) M Lundqvist (Denmark) B Pedersen	17	18
(Indonesia) J Hidayat (Indonesia) E Tjandra	21	21
(Germany) P Muhl (Germany) K Kubitza	21	5	12
(Thailand) W Somchariya (Thailand) B Tanthammaroj	18	21	21

Second round
(Indonesia) J Hidayat (Indonesia) E Tjandra	21	24
(United Arab Emirates) B Haryadi (United Arab Emirates) T M Cherian	18	22
(Belgium) J Van den Brande (Denmark) G Mathiasen	13	15
5/8	(Japan) H Fujimoto (Japan) T Hinoishi	21	21
(Thailand) W Somchariya (Thailand) B Tanthammaroj	21	21
(South Korea) Yang S-h (South Korea) Park S-w	11	13
(India) M Adhyaru (India) S Chakrabarty	21	18	13
3/4	(England) M King (England) L Swan	19	21	21

Third round
(Indonesia) J Hidayat (Indonesia) E Tjandra	24	12
5/8	(Japan) H Fujimoto (Japan) T Hinoishi	26	21
(Thailand) W Somchariya (Thailand) B Tanthammaroj	19	21	21
3/4	(England) M King (England) L Swan	21	16	15

Quarter-finals
5/8	(Japan) H Fujimoto (Japan) T Hinoishi	21	21
(Thailand) W Somchariya (Thailand) B Tanthammaroj	16	8

==== Section 4 ====
First round
(South Korea) Seok W-c (South Korea) Yang M-r	7	5
(Japan) H Arita (Japan) R Takahashi	21	21

Second round
(Japan) H Arita (Japan) R Takahashi	20	10
(Germany) B Wippich (Germany) J Willems	22	21
(Scotland) R Campbell (Scotland) L Campbell	15	16
5/8	(Denmark) H Pøhler (Denmark) M Asmussen	21	21
(Denmark) L Klintrup (Sri Lanka) C de Silva	21	21
(Netherlands) S Tjoa (Netherlands) M van der Woerdt	14	14
(England) K Jones (England) B Blair	23	24	16
2	(India) S Abbasi (India) P Mehta	25	22	21

Third round
(Germany) B Wippich (Germany) J Willems	21	21
5/8	(Denmark) H Pøhler (Denmark) M Asmussen	12	8
(Denmark) L Klintrup (Sri Lanka) C de Silva	20	21	15
2	(India) S Abbasi (India) P Mehta	22	11	21

Quarter-finals
(Germany) B Wippich (Germany) J Willems	21	21
2	(India) S Abbasi (India) P Mehta	18	14
