= 2023 BWF World Senior Championships – 40+ =

Tournament details
- Dates: 11 September 2023 – 17 September 2023
- Edition: 11
- Level: International
- Competitors: 183 from 26 nations
- Venue: Hwasan Indoor Stadium; Jeonju Indoor Badminton Hall
- Location: Jeonju, South Korea

Champions
- Men's singles: (Chinese Taipei) Yang Chia-hao
- Women's singles: (Denmark) Gry Uhrenholt Hermansen
- Men's doubles: (Thailand) Boonsak Ponsana (Thailand) Jakrapan Thanathiratham
- Women's doubles: (Iceland) Drífa Harðardóttir (Denmark) Gry Uhrenholt Hermansen
- Mixed doubles: (Thailand) Jakrapan Thanathiratham (Thailand) Kamonwan Winyoowijak

These are the results of 2023 BWF World Senior Championships' 40+ events.

== Competition schedule ==
Match was played as scheduled below.

#R	Preliminary rounds	QF	Quarter-finals	SF	Semi-finals	F	Finals

H	Hwasan Indoor Stadium	J	Jeonju Indoor Badminton Hall

Date	11 Sep		12 Sep		13 Sep		14 Sep		15 Sep	16 Sep	17 Sep
Venue	H	J	H	J	H	J	H	J	H	H	H
Men's singles		1R	2R		3R			QF		SF	F
Women's singles					1R			2R	QF	SF	F
Men's doubles		1R	2R					3R	QF	SF	F
Women's doubles		1R			2R			QF		SF	F
Mixed doubles		1R	2R		3R				QF	SF	F

== Medal summary ==
=== Medal standings ===
* Host nation (South Korea)

2023 BWF World Senior Championships medal table
Rank	Nation	Gold	Silver	Bronze	Total
1	Thailand	2	2	0	4
2	Denmark	1.5	0	0	1.5
3	Chinese Taipei	1	1	2.5	4.5
4	Iceland	0.5	0	0	0.5
5	Japan	0	1	2	3
6	Germany	0	1	0	1
7	India	0	0	3	3
8	Norway	0	0	1	1
8	Romania	0	0	1	1
10	United States	0	0	0.5	0.5
Totals (10 entries)		5	5	10	20

=== Medalists ===
Event	Gold	Silver	Bronze
Men's singles	(Chinese Taipei) Yang Chia-hao	(Japan) Daichi Hanamoto	(Japan) Kazutaka Ninomiya
Men's singles	(Chinese Taipei) Yang Chia-hao	(Japan) Daichi Hanamoto	(Chinese Taipei) Wang Li-wei
Women's singles	(Denmark) Gry Uhrenholt Hermansen	(Thailand) Kamonwan Winyoowijak	(Chinese Taipei) Cheng Wen-hsing
Women's singles	(Denmark) Gry Uhrenholt Hermansen	(Thailand) Kamonwan Winyoowijak	(Japan) Sayaka Ueyama
Men's doubles	(Thailand) Boonsak Ponsana (Thailand) Jakrapan Thanathiratham	(Chinese Taipei) Feng Hung-yun (Chinese Taipei) Yang Chia-hao	(Romania) Robert Ciobotaru (Romania) Daniel Cojocaru
Men's doubles	(Thailand) Boonsak Ponsana (Thailand) Jakrapan Thanathiratham	(Chinese Taipei) Feng Hung-yun (Chinese Taipei) Yang Chia-hao	(India) J. B. S. Vidyadhar (India) Sanave Thomas
Women's doubles	(Iceland) Drífa Harðardóttir (Denmark) Gry Uhrenholt Hermansen	(Germany) Tiina Kähler (Germany) Jessica Willems	(Chinese Taipei) Cheng Wen-hsing (United States) Katy Li
Women's doubles	(Iceland) Drífa Harðardóttir (Denmark) Gry Uhrenholt Hermansen	(Germany) Tiina Kähler (Germany) Jessica Willems	(India) Nupura Gadgil (India) Pooja Patil
Mixed doubles	(Thailand) Jakrapan Thanathiratham (Thailand) Kamonwan Winyoowijak	(Thailand) Naruenart Chuaymak (Thailand) Thanyalak Dechprarom	(Norway) Jim Ronny Andersen (Norway) Helene Abusdal
Mixed doubles	(Thailand) Jakrapan Thanathiratham (Thailand) Kamonwan Winyoowijak	(Thailand) Naruenart Chuaymak (Thailand) Thanyalak Dechprarom	(India) Sunil Gladson Varadaraj (India) Pooja Patil

== Men's singles ==
=== Seeds ===
1. (Thailand) Boonsak Ponsana (quarter-finals)
2. (England) Andrew Aspinal (third round)
3. (France) Quentin Gallet (second round)
4. (France) Mathieu Seignez (second round)
5. (Switzerland) Jan Fröhlich (third round)
6. (Poland) Adam Kosz (third round)
7. (Finland) Jesper von Hertzen (second round)
8. (Chinese Taipei) Yang Chia-hao (champion; gold medalist)

=== Finals ===
Semi-finals
(Japan) Daichi Hanamoto	21	21
(Japan) Kazutaka Ninomiya	15	11
(Chinese Taipei) Wang Li-wei	13	12
5/8	(Chinese Taipei) Yang Chia-hao	21	21

Final
(Japan) Daichi Hanamoto	16	18
5/8	(Chinese Taipei) Yang Chia-hao	21	21

=== Top half ===
==== Section 1 ====
First round
(Czech Republic) M Šimo	21	21
(France) M Dahler	16	12
(Germany) M Prinz	21	21
(Sweden) P Eriksson	8	2
(India) A Kattapurath	21	21
(Singapore) V Chotteyandamada	10	15
(England) P Freeman	4	10
(Japan) D Hanamoto	21	21
(Hong Kong) Lau C W	21	21
(South Korea) Kook J-h	16	19

Second round
1	(Thailand) B Ponsana	21	21
(Czech Republic) M Šimo	11	10
(Chinese Taipei) Tsai L-a	12	5
(Germany) M Prinz	21	21
5/8	(Switzerland) J Fröhlich	21	21
(India) A Kattapurath	18	9
(Japan) D Hanamoto	21	21
(Hong Kong) Lau C W	6	6

Third round
1	(Thailand) B Ponsana	21	21
(Germany) M Prinz	9	17
5/8	(Switzerland) J Fröhlich	21	11	15
(Japan) D Hanamoto	19	21	21

Quarter-finals
1	(Thailand) B Ponsana	12	19
(Japan) D Hanamoto	21	21

==== Section 2 ====
First round
(United States) R K Mariappan	7	13
(India) Y Chauhan	21	21
(Denmark) S Hermansen	18	23	18
(Thailand) D Ruaenghutthakarn	21	21	21
(Hong Kong) Ng C K	21	21
(Spain) S Latorre	4	8
(Romania) B Cretu	21	19	19
(United Arab Emirates) R R Bhat	16	21	21
(South Korea) Shin H-w	3	11
(Japan) K Ninomiya	21	21

Second round
3/4	(France) Q Gallet	21	13	11
(India) Y Chauhan	12	21	21
(Chinese Taipei) Hsieh S-h	13	11
(Thailand) D Ruaenghutthakarn	21	21
5/8	(Finland) J von Hertzen	21	20	11
(Hong Kong) Ng C K	13	22	21
(United Arab Emirates) R R Bhat	17	11
(Japan) K Ninomiya	21	21

Third round
(India) Y Chauhan	15	21	21
(Thailand) D Ruaenghutthakarn	21	15	19
(Hong Kong) Ng C K	13	16
(Japan) K Ninomiya	21	21

Quarter-finals
(India) Y Chauhan	13	16
(Japan) K Ninomiya	21	21

=== Bottom half ===
==== Section 3 ====
First round
(Czech Republic) P Dubský	6	5
(England) C Spice	21	21
(Thailand) S Suwanphom	21	16	15
(Finland) H Aro	14	21	21
(South Korea) Choi Y-h	13	21	15
(Spain) D Hernansanz	21	12	21
(India) V Ojha	21	21
(Sweden) K Svensson	5	5
(Japan) K Watanabe	17	7^{r}
(Chinese Taipei) Wang L-w	21	7
(Germany) P Histel	21	21
(Romania) R Ciobotaru	18	18

Second round
(England) C Spice
(Finland) H Aro	w	/	o
(Spain) D Hernansanz	7	12
5/8	(Poland) A Kosz	21	21
(India) V Ojha	16	18
(Chinese Taipei) Wang L-w	21	21
(Germany) P Histel	21	19	21
3/4	(France) M Seignez	11	21	13

Third round
(Finland) H Aro	21	21
5/8	(Poland) A Kosz	12	13
(Chinese Taipei) Wang L-w	21	21
(Germany) P Histel	6	10

Quarter-finals
(Finland) H Aro	10	8
(Chinese Taipei) Wang L-w	21	21

==== Section 4 ====
First round
(Bulgaria) E Andreev	13	17
(France) S Coto	21	21
(United Arab Emirates) V Reyes	21	21
(South Korea) Park K-s	7	9
(Japan) M Higashi	21	21
(Thailand) K Nanakorn	7	6
(Sweden) M Tornemo	9	7
(Hong Kong) Leung W L	21	21
(Romania) G Constantinescu	22	19	21
(Switzerland) T Bless	20	21	14

Second round
(France) S Coto	9	21	21
(United Arab Emirates) V Reyes	21	16	19
(Japan) M Higashi	8	16
5/8	(Chinese Taipei) Yang C-h	21	21
(Hong Kong) Leung W L	21	23	21
(India) A Baidya	9	25	17
(Romania) G Constantinescu	10	14
2	(England) A Aspinal	21	21

Third round
(France) S Coto	8	7
5/8	(Chinese Taipei) Yang C-h	21	21
(Hong Kong) Leung W L	23	21
2	(England) A Aspinal	21	8

Quarter-finals
5/8	(Chinese Taipei) Yang C-h	21	21
(Hong Kong) Leung W L	8	8

== Women's singles ==
=== Seeds ===
1. (Poland) Dominika Guzik-Płuchowska (quarter-finals)
2. (Norway) Helene Abusdal (second round)
3. (Chinese Taipei) Cheng Wen-hsing (semi-finals; bronze medalist)
4. (Denmark) Gry Uhrenholt Hermansen (champion; gold medalist)
5. (England) Anna Kondratieva (quarter-finals)
6. (India) Himani Punia (second round)
7. (South Korea) Song Yoo-jeong (first round)
8. (Thailand) Kamonwan Winyoowijak (final; silver medalist)

=== Finals ===
Semi-finals
5/8	(Thailand) Kamonwan Winyoowijak	18	21	21
3/4	(Chinese Taipei) Cheng Wen-hsing	21	17	15
3/4	(Denmark) Gry Uhrenholt Hermansen	21	21
(Japan) Sayaka Ueyama	13	14

Final
5/8	(Thailand) Kamonwan Winyoowijak	23	13	7
3/4	(Denmark) Gry Uhrenholt Hermansen	21	21	21

=== Top half ===
==== Section 1 ====
First round
1	(Poland) D Guzik-Płuchowska	21	21
(Bulgaria) S Tarakchieva	5	2
(Japan) H Takeuchi	21	21
(Spain) S del Busto	15	8
5/8	(Thailand) K Winyoowijak	21	21
(India) M Singh	10	4
(South Korea) Jeong G-r	0	6
(United States) K Li	21	21

Second round
1	(Poland) D Guzik-Płuchowska	21	19	21
(Japan) H Takeuchi	8	21	7
5/8	(Thailand) K Winyoowijak	21	21
(United States) K Li	14	19

Quarter-finals
1	(Poland) D Guzik-Płuchowska	23	8	14
5/8	(Thailand) K Winyoowijak	21	21	21

==== Section 2 ====
First round
3/4	(Chinese Taipei) Cheng W-h	21	21
(England) C Batty	13	10
(India) B Yupu	9	17
(Germany) H Vogt	21	21
5/8	(South Korea) Song Y-j	13	14
(Thailand) P Leelasilaprasart	21	21
(Czech Republic) Z Matějková	7	10
(Japan) N Sanada	21	21

Second round
3/4	(Chinese Taipei) Cheng W-h	21	21
(Germany) H Vogt	7	9
(Thailand) P Leelasilaprasart	16	22	15
(Japan) N Sanada	21	20	21

Quarter-finals
3/4	(Chinese Taipei) Cheng W-h	21	21
(Japan) N Sanada	13	5

=== Bottom half ===
==== Section 3 ====
First round
(Spain) V Serrano	21	21
(South Korea) Jeong S-y	5	10
(Poland) M Kołaczkowska	11	10
5/8	(India) H Punia	21	21
(Sweden) W Fredriksson
(Japan) M Kasai	w	/	o
(Germany) N Rech	16	8
3/4	(Denmark) G U Hermansen	21	21

Second round
(Spain) V Serrano	21	20	23
5/8	(India) H Punia	7	22	21
(Japan) M Kasai	10	6
3/4	(Denmark) G U Hermansen	21	21

Quarter-finals
(Spain) V Serrano	10	3
3/4	(Denmark) G U Hermansen	21	21

==== Section 4 ====
First round
(South Korea) Park M-j	7	15
(Thailand) M Thongdejsri	21	21
(Spain) C Puebla	16	7
5/8	(England) A Kondratieva	21	21
(Japan) S Ueyama	21	21
(France) A Pérégrina	9	6
(India) Jayashree P. N.	4	13
2	(Norway) H Abusdal	21	21

Second round
(Thailand) M Thongdejsri	17	18
5/8	(England) A Kondratieva	21	21
(Japan) S Ueyama	21	21
2	(Norway) H Abusdal	15	10

Quarter-finals
(England) A Kondratieva	14	7
(Japan) S Ueyama	21	21

== Men's doubles ==
=== Seeds ===
1. (Thailand) Boonsak Ponsana / Jakrapan Thanathiratham (champions; gold medalists)
2. (India) J. B. S. Vidyadhar / Sanave Thomas (semi-finals; bronze medalists)
3. (England) Andrew Aspinal / Vinay Kumar (third round)
4. (England) Paul Freeman / Philip Troke (third round)
5. (Chinese Taipei) Feng Hung-yun / Yang Chia-hao (final; silver medalists)
6. (Japan) Hosemari Fujimoto / Tsuyoshi Fukui (quarter-finals)
7. (France) Quentin Gallet / Mathieu Seignez (third round)
8. (Germany) Pascal Histel / Michael Prinz (third round)

=== Finals ===
Semi-finals
1	(Thailand) Boonsak Ponsana (Thailand) Jakrapan Thanathiratham	21	21
(Romania) Robert Ciobotaru (Romania) Daniel Cojocaru	19	17
5/8	(Chinese Taipei) Feng Hung-yun (Chinese Taipei) Yang Chia-hao	18	24	21
2	(India) J. B. S. Vidyadhar (India) Sanave Thomas	21	22	16

Final
1	(Thailand) Boonsak Ponsana (Thailand) Jakrapan Thanathiratham	21	21
5/8	(Chinese Taipei) Feng Hung-yun (Chinese Taipei) Yang Chia-hao	13	19

=== Top half ===
==== Section 1 ====
First round
(Finland) H Aro (Finland) J von Hertzen	21	20	21
(Chinese Taipei) Lee Y-j (Chinese Taipei) Wu C-y	14	22	16

Second round
1	(Thailand) B Ponsana (Thailand) J Thanathiratham	21	21
(France) A Baudet (France) M Dahler	7	10
(United States) A Nair (United States) A Umrani	21	21
(South Korea) Kang J-w (South Korea) Kim S	16	12
5/8	(Japan) H Fujimoto (Japan) T Fukui	21	21
(Hong Kong) Cheung C F (Hong Kong) Fung S K	17	11
(India) Y Dayal (India) M Christopher M. P.	21	21
(Finland) H Aro (Finland) J von Hertzen	9	18

Third round
1	(Thailand) B Ponsana (Thailand) J Thanathiratham	21	21
(United States) A Nair (United States) A Umrani	17	11
5/8	(Japan) H Fujimoto (Japan) T Fukui	21	21
(India) Y Dayal (India) M Christopher M. P.	9	14

Quarter-finals
1	(Thailand) B Ponsana (Thailand) J Thanathiratham	24	21
5/8	(Japan) H Fujimoto (Japan) T Fukui	22	19

==== Section 2 ====
First round
(Bulgaria) E Andreev (Malaysia) V Loh	14	18
(Sri Lanka) G Shimal (Sri Lanka) S Sudharshan	21	21

Second round
3/4	(England) A Aspinal (England) V Kumar	21	21
(South Korea) Go T-y (South Korea) Park K-r	13	10
(Romania) R Ciobotaru (Romania) D Cojocaru	21	21
(Chinese Taipei) Lee C-y (Chinese Taipei) Yu C-h	18	15
5/8	(Germany) P Histel (Germany) M Prinz	w	/	o
(Japan) T Morinaga (Japan) K Watanabe
(India) D Dhillon (India) H Duggal	21	21
(Sri Lanka) G Shimal (Sri Lanka) S Sudharshan	10	18

Third round
3/4	(England) A Aspinal (England) V Kumar	7	16
(Romania) R Ciobotaru (Romania) D Cojocaru	21	21
5/8	(Germany) P Histel (Germany) M Prinz	19	25
(India) D Dhillon (India) H Duggal	21	27

Quarter-finals
(Romania) R Ciobotaru (Romania) D Cojocaru	21	21
(India) D Dhillon (India) H Duggal	19	11

=== Bottom half ===
==== Section 3 ====
First round
(Thailand) C Korkeatudom (Thailand) D Ruaenghutthakarn	21	21
(India) R Nimkar (India) V Ojha	13	14
(France) K-T Khamchanh-Vannouvong (France) P Lepage	9	12
(Japan) M Higashi (Japan) H Mine	21	21

Second round
(Thailand) C Korkeatudom (Thailand) D Ruaenghutthakarn	21	21
(Czech Republic) P Dubský (Czech Republic) M Šimo	7	7
(South Korea) Kim J-e (South Korea) Park K-j	7	14
5/8	(Chinese Taipei) Feng H-y (Chinese Taipei) Yang C-h	21	21
(Japan) M Higashi (Japan) H Mine	21	21
(United Arab Emirates) R R Bhat (United Arab Emirates) V Reyes	8	12
(Romania) G Constantinescu (Romania) B Cretu	10	9
3/4	(England) P Freeman (England) P Troke	21	21

Third round
(Thailand) C Korkeatudom (Thailand) D Ruaenghutthakarn	7	14
5/8	(Chinese Taipei) Feng H-y (Chinese Taipei) Yang C-h	21	21
(Japan) M Higashi (Japan) H Mine	22	21
3/4	(England) P Freeman (England) P Troke	20	10

Quarter-finals
5/8	(Chinese Taipei) Feng H-y (Chinese Taipei) Yang C-h	21	21
(Japan) M Higashi (Japan) H Mine	17	14

==== Section 4 ====
First round
(Thailand) K Nanakorn (Thailand) S Suwanphom	21	21
(Chinese Taipei) Hsieh S-h (Chinese Taipei) Tsai L-a	16	18

Second round
(Thailand) K Nanakorn (Thailand) S Suwanphom	16	11
(Japan) T Tada (Japan) R Yuki	21	21
(Spain) S Latorre (Spain) S Martínez	9	6
5/8	(France) Q Gallet (France) M Seignez	21	21
(United States) R K Mariappan (United States) A Mishra	21	19	21
(South Korea) Hong M-s (South Korea) Kim B-k	17	21	16
(Hong Kong) Leung W L (Hong Kong) Ng C K	14	16
2	(India) J. B. S. Vidyadhar (India) S Thomas	21	21

Third round
(Japan) T Tada (Japan) R Yuki	21	21
5/8	(France) Q Gallet (France) M Seignez	13	15
(United States) R K Mariappan (United States) A Mishra	11	12
2	(India) J. B. S. Vidyadhar (India) S Thomas	21	21

Quarter-finals
(Japan) T Tada (Japan) R Yuki	17	21	13
2	(India) J. B. S. Vidyadhar (India) S Thomas	21	19	21

== Women's doubles ==
=== Seeds ===
1. (Iceland) Drífa Harðardóttir / (Denmark) Gry Uhrenholt Hermansen (champion; gold medalists)
2. (India) Nupura Gadgil / Pooja Patil (semi-finals; bronze medalists)
3. (Germany) Tiina Kähler / Jessica Willems (final; silver medalists)
4. (Czech Republic) Zuzana Matějková / (Germany) Nicole Rech (second round)

=== Finals ===
Semi-finals
1	(Iceland) Drífa Harðardóttir (Denmark) Gry Uhrenholt Hermansen	21	21
(Chinese Taipei) Cheng Wen-hsing (United States) Katy Li	13	18
3/4	(Germany) Tiina Kähler (Germany) Jessica Willems	21	21
2	(India) Nupura Gadgil (India) Pooja Patil	16	15

Final
1	(Iceland) Drífa Harðardóttir (Denmark) Gry Uhrenholt Hermansen	21	21
3/4	(Germany) Tiina Kähler (Germany) Jessica Willems	12	9

=== Top half ===
==== Section 1 ====
First round
(Japan) S Nunome (Japan) S Ueyama	21	22
(Thailand) T Dechprarom (Thailand) K Winyoowijak	16	20

Second round
1	(Iceland) D Harðardóttir (Denmark) G U Hermansen	21	21
(India) H Punia (India) N Santhanam	9	3
(South Korea) Kang H-j (South Korea) Lee M-j	7	3
(Japan) S Nunome (Japan) S Ueyama	21	21

Quarter-finals
1	(Iceland) D Harðardóttir (Denmark) G U Hermansen	21	21
(Japan) S Nunome (Japan) S Ueyama	6	14

==== Section 2 ====
First round
(Chinese Taipei) Lu M-c (Chinese Taipei) Tsao T-c	21	21
(South Korea) Kim M-j (South Korea) Park M-j	13	10
(Japan) M Okamoto (Japan) H Takeuchi	12	17
(Chinese Taipei) Cheng W-h (United States) K Li	21	21

Second round
3/4	(Czech Republic) Z Matějková (Germany) N Rech	13	12
(Chinese Taipei) Lu M-c (Chinese Taipei) Tsao T-c	21	21
SUB	(India) S Jethwani (India) A Lotke	5	7
(Chinese Taipei) Cheng W-h (United States) K Li	21	21

Quarter-finals
(Chinese Taipei) Lu M-c (Chinese Taipei) Tsao T-c	12	17
(Chinese Taipei) Cheng W-h (United States) K Li	21	21

=== Bottom half ===
==== Section 3 ====
First round
(England) A Kondratieva (Switzerland) F Striebel	15	21	21
(India) R Ingalhalikar (India) S Pujari	21	19	16
(Japan) A Morio (Japan) K Takeuchi	21	21
(England) C Batty (England) M Rossil	12	6

Second round
(England) A Kondratieva (Switzerland) F Striebel	20	10
(South Korea) Kim H-r (South Korea) Kim H-h	22	21
(Japan) A Morio (Japan) K Takeuchi	16	21	12
3/4	(Germany) T Kähler (Germany) J Willems	21	16	21

Quarter-finals
(South Korea) Kim H-r (South Korea) Kim H-h	8	18
3/4	(Germany) T Kähler (Germany) J Willems	21	21

==== Section 4 ====
First round
(Spain) C Puebla (Spain) E Segarra	2	7
(Scotland) L Campbell (Poland) D Guzik-Płuchowska	21	21
(Romania) A M Popa (Bulgaria) S Tarakchieva	w	/	o
(Sweden) W Fredriksson (Sweden) A Stenmark

Second round
(Scotland) L Campbell (Poland) D Guzik-Płuchowska	16	21	21
(Japan) M Kasai (Japan) K Kimura	21	11	10
(Romania) A M Popa (Bulgaria) S Tarakchieva	15	9
2	(India) N Gadgil (India) P Patil	21	21

Quarter-finals
(Scotland) L Campbell (Poland) D Guzik-Płuchowska	17	21	11
2	(India) N Gadgil (India) P Patil	21	18	21

== Mixed doubles ==
=== Seeds ===
1. (Norway) Jim Ronny Andersen / Helene Abusdal (semi-finals; bronze medalists)
2. (India) Sunil Gladson Varadaraj / Pooja Patil (semi-finals; bronze medalists)
3. (Denmark) Søren Hermansen / Gry Uhrenholt Hermansen (quarter-finals)
4. (Germany) Pascal Histel / Tiina Kähler (quarter-finals)
5. (Japan) Tsuyoshi Fukui / Miyuki Kusanagi (second round)
6. (Chinese Taipei) Lee Ching-yu / Su Yu-pei (second round)
7. (India) Sanave Thomas / Nupura Gadgil (quarter-finals)
8. (Finland) Jesper von Hertzen / Emmi Heikkinen (third round)

=== Finals ===
Semi-finals
1	(Norway) Jim Ronny Andersen (Norway) Helene Abusdal
(Thailand) Jakrapan Thanathiratham (Thailand) Kamonwan Winyoowijak	w	/	o
(Thailand) Naruenart Chuaymak (Thailand) Thanyalak Dechprarom	14	21	21
2	(India) Sunil Gladson Varadaraj (India) Pooja Patil	21	18	18

Final
(Thailand) Jakrapan Thanathiratham (Thailand) Kamonwan Winyoowijak	17	21	21
(Thailand) Naruenart Chuaymak (Thailand) Thanyalak Dechprarom	21	17	12

=== Top half ===
==== Section 1 ====
First round
(England) P Freeman (England) K Fairey	21	21
(Spain) L A Morcillo (Spain) V Serrano	15	6
(Japan) T Morinaga (Japan) A Morio	21	21
(South Korea) Park Y-s (South Korea) Son J-h	7	7

Second round
1	(Norway) J R Andersen (Norway) H Abusdal	21	21
(Chinese Taipei) Yang C-h (Chinese Taipei) Tsao T-c	13	15
(Singapore) V Chotteyandamada (Germany) N Rech	21	16	21
(England) P Freeman (England) K Fairey	15	21	15
5/8	(India) S Thomas (India) N Gadgil	21	21
(Thailand) D Ruaenghutthakarn (Thailand) K Khampachue	12	12
(Bulgaria) E Andreev (Bulgaria) S Tarakchieva	13	7
(Japan) T Morinaga (Japan) A Morio	21	21

Third round
1	(Norway) J R Andersen (Norway) H Abusdal	21	21
(Singapore) V Chotteyandamada (Germany) N Rech	16	11
5/8	(India) S Thomas (India) N Gadgil	21	21
(Japan) T Morinaga (Japan) A Morio	15	19

Quarter-finals
1	(Norway) J R Andersen (Norway) H Abusdal	16	21	21
5/8	(India) S Thomas (India) N Gadgil	21	12	19

==== Section 2 ====
First round
(France) Q Gallet (France) A Pérégrina	21	17	21
(Japan) M Okawara (Japan) M Okamoto	18	21	18
(South Korea) Choi J-w (South Korea) Kim H-h	10	16
(Thailand) J Thanathiratham (Thailand) K Winyoowijak	21	21
(Romania) G Constantinescu (Poland) M Kołaczkowska	10	9
(India) A Sharma (India) B Sharma	21	21

Second round
3/4	(Denmark) S Hermansen (Denmark) G U Hermansen	21	21
(Spain) D Hernansanz (Spain) E Segarra	8	4
(Poland) A Kosz (England) A Kondratieva	22	13
(France) Q Gallet (France) A Pérégrina	24	21
5/8	(Chinese Taipei) Lee C-y (Chinese Taipei) Su Y-p	10	14
(Thailand) J Thanathiratham (Thailand) K Winyoowijak	21	21
(Germany) M Prinz (Germany) H Vogt	14	17
(India) A Sharma (India) B Sharma	21	21

Third round
3/4	(Denmark) S Hermansen (Denmark) G U Hermansen	16	21	21
(France) Q Gallet (France) A Pérégrina	21	13	15
(Thailand) J Thanathiratham (Thailand) K Winyoowijak	21	21
(India) A Sharma (India) B Sharma	17	7

Quarter-finals
3/4	(Denmark) S Hermansen (Denmark) G U Hermansen	12	16
(Thailand) J Thanathiratham (Thailand) K Winyoowijak	21	21

=== Bottom half ===
==== Section 3 ====
First round
(Japan) H Mine (Japan) K Takeuchi	21	21
(France) A Baudet (France) J Gazeau-Maillard	19	13
(India) A Baidya (India) U Dey	20	12
(Chinese Taipei) Yu C-h (Chinese Taipei) Weng C-y	22	21
(South Korea) Lim C-h (South Korea) Choi H-h	21	21
(Spain) S Latorre (Spain) C Puebla	9	9

Second round
(Japan) H Mine (Japan) K Takeuchi	8	10
(Thailand) N Chuaymak (Thailand) T Dechprarom	21	21
(Chinese Taipei) Yu C-h (Chinese Taipei) Weng C-y	10	6
5/8	(Finland) J von Hertzen (Finland) E Heikkinen	21	21
(South Korea) Lim C-h (South Korea) Choi H-h	21	21
(England) V Kumar (Denmark) H Mathiasen	11	9
(England) A Aspinal (Sweden) A Stenmark
3/4	(Germany) P Histel (Germany) T Kähler	w	/	o

Third round
(Thailand) N Chuaymak (Thailand) T Dechprarom	26	21	21
5/8	(Finland) J von Hertzen (Finland) E Heikkinen	28	7	19
(South Korea) Lim C-h (South Korea) Choi H-h	16	18
3/4	(Germany) P Histel (Germany) T Kähler	21	21

Quarter-finals
(Thailand) N Chuaymak (Thailand) T Dechprarom	21	21
3/4	(Germany) P Histel (Germany) T Kähler	12	18

==== Section 4 ====
First round
(France) S Coto (Czech Republic) Z Matějková	17	21	21
(Spain) Á Rangil (Spain) S del Busto	21	14	18
(Sri Lanka) G Shimal (Sri Lanka) L Punchihewa	7	10
(Thailand) C Korkeatudom (Thailand) P Leelasilaprasart	21	21

Second round
(France) S Coto (Czech Republic) Z Matějková	18	21	21
(Chinese Taipei) Yu K-c (Chinese Taipei) Lu Y-c	21	15	16
(Hong Kong) Cheung C F (Hong Kong) Chan P C	21	21
5/8	(Japan) T Fukui (Japan) M Kusanagi	17	18
(Thailand) C Korkeatudom (Thailand) P Leelasilaprasart	21	21
(South Korea) Lim H-t (South Korea) Kwon Y-m	12	12
(England) P Troke (England) C Batty	10	15
2	(India) S G Varadaraj (India) P Patil	21	21

Third round
(France) S Coto (Czech Republic) Z Matějková	8	14
(Hong Kong) Cheung C F (Hong Kong) Chan P C	21	21
(Thailand) C Korkeatudom (Thailand) P Leelasilaprasart	11	21	16
2	(India) S G Varadaraj (India) P Patil	21	12	21

Quarter-finals
(Hong Kong) Cheung C F (Hong Kong) Chan P C	10	12
2	(India) S G Varadaraj (India) P Patil	21	21
