= Tony Gunawan =

Indonesian-born American badminton player (born 1975)

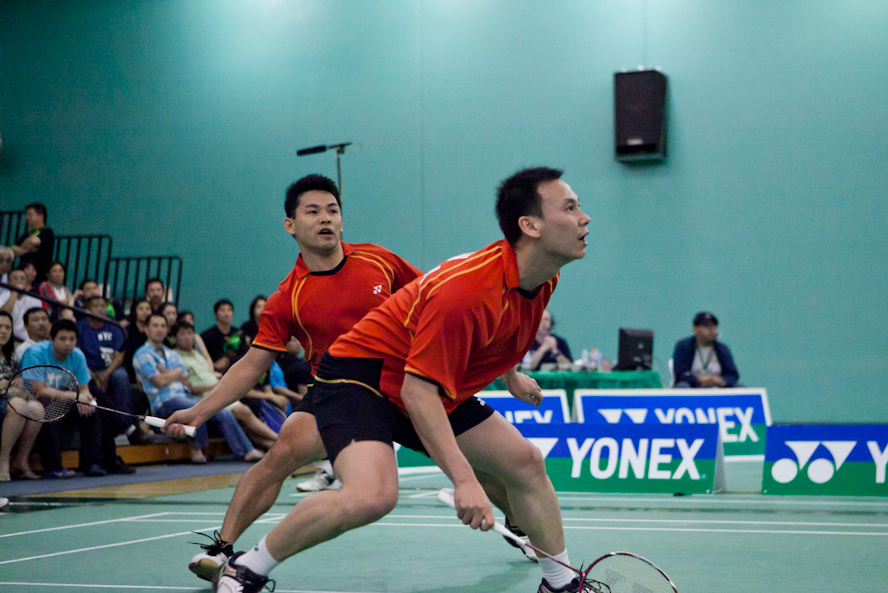
- Howard Bach (left) and Tony Gunawan (right) at the 2011 US Open

Personal information
- Born: April 9, 1975 (age 51) Surabaya, East Java, Indonesia
- Height: 1.75 m (5 ft 9 in)
- Spouse: Etty Tantri (m. 2002)

Sport
- Country: Indonesia (until 2001); United States (2001–present)
- Sport: Badminton
- Coached by: Christian Hadinata; Herry Iman Pierngadi
- Highest ranking: 1
- BWF profile
Medal record
Men's badminton
Representing United States
World Championships
Gold medal – first place	2005 Anaheim	Men's doubles
World Cup
Bronze medal – third place	2005 Yiyang	Men's doubles
World Masters Games
Gold medal – first place	2017 Auckland	Men's doubles 35+ (Note: Based on data on the official website, Tony Gunawan represented Indonesia at the 2017 World Masters Games. However, he actually moved to the United States in 2002, the data on the official website is probably wrong.)
Silver medal – second place	2017 Auckland	Men's doubles 40+
World Senior Championships
Gold medal – first place	2015 Helsingborg	Men's doubles 35+
Gold medal – first place	2023 Jeonju	Men's doubles 45+
Gold medal – first place	2025 Pattaya	Men's doubles 40+
Bronze medal – third place	2025 Pattaya	Mixed doubles 45+
Pan American Games
Gold medal – first place	2011 Guadalajara	Men's doubles
Representing Indonesia
Olympic Games
Gold medal – first place	2000 Sydney	Men's doubles
World Championships
Gold medal – first place	2001 Seville	Men's doubles
Sudirman Cup
Silver medal – second place	2001 Seville	Mixed team
Bronze medal – third place	1999 Copenhagen	Mixed team
Thomas Cup
Gold medal – first place	1998 Hong Kong	Men's team
Gold medal – first place	2000 Kuala Lumpur	Men's team
Asian Games
Gold medal – first place	1998 Bangkok	Men's team
Asian Championships
Gold medal – first place	2000 Jakarta	Men's doubles
Silver medal – second place	2001 Manila	Men's doubles
Asian Cup
Silver medal – second place	1996 Seoul	Men's doubles
Asia Cup
Gold medal – first place	1999 Ho Chi Minh	Men's team
SEA Games
Silver medal – second place	2001 Kuala Lumpur	Men's doubles
Silver medal – second place	2001 Kuala Lumpur	Men's team

Tony Gunawan (Chinese: 吳俊明; pinyin: Wu Junming; born April 9, 1975) is an Indonesian-born American former badminton player. He gained several international achievements for Indonesia and later for the United States, including an Olympic gold medal and world champion title.

== Career ==
Gunawan is a former Olympic gold medalist and world champion for Indonesia, and later a world champion for the United States. He is regarded by many, including his peers, as one of the greatest doubles players in badminton history. A superb all-court player with a particular facility in the forecourt, he won the 2000 Olympic gold medal, the 2001 IBF World Championships, and 2005 IBF World Championships with 3 different men's doubles partners.

He won the men's doubles gold medal in the 2005 World Championships from the 13th seeded position with his American partner Howard Bach. Gunawan partnered with Halim Haryanto to win the 2001 World Championships as well as the 2001 All-England Open, and with Candra Wijaya to win the 2000 Olympics in Sydney. He was a member of the world champion 2000 Indonesia Thomas Cup team, winning his match in the final against China with yet another partner, Rexy Mainaky.

Gunawan and Bach won the 2005 IBF World Championships Men's Doubles gold over Gunawan's ex-partner Wijaya and Sigit Budiarto who were also finalists in the 2003 IBF World Championships in the same event. Tony played for Indonesia from 1992 to 2001 and won numerous international titles. He has coached and played for USA since 2001. Tony is currently studying in Orange County, California and coaches at Global Badminton Academy.

== Awards ==
Award	Year	Category	Result	Ref.
United States Olympic Committee Award	2005	US Olympic Committee Team of The Year	Won	

== Achievements ==
=== Olympic Games ===
Men's doubles
Year	Venue	Partner	Opponent	Score	Result	Ref.
2000	The Dome, Sydney, Australia	(Indonesia) Candra Wijaya	(South Korea) Lee Dong-soo (South Korea) Yoo Yong-sung	15–10, 9–15, 15–7	Gold	

=== World Championships ===
Men's doubles
Year	Venue	Partner	Opponent	Score	Result	Ref.
2001	Palacio de Deportes de San Pablo; Seville, Spain	(Indonesia) Halim Haryanto	(South Korea) Ha Tae-kwon (South Korea) Kim Dong-moon	15–0, 15–13	Gold	
2005	Arrowhead Pond, Anaheim, United States	(United States) Howard Bach	(Indonesia) Sigit Budiarto (Indonesia) Candra Wijaya	15–11, 10–15, 15–11	Gold	

=== World Cup ===
Men's doubles
Year	Venue	Partner	Opponent	Score	Result	Ref.
2005	Olympic Park, Yiyang, China	(United States) Howard Bach	(Indonesia) Sigit Budiarto (Indonesia) Candra Wijaya	18–21, 9–21	Bronze	

=== World Masters Games ===
Men's doubles
Year	Age	Venue	Partner	Opponent	Score	Result	Ref.
2017	35+	Auckland Badminton Centre; Auckland, New Zealand	(Indonesia) Tri Kusharjanto	(Czech Republic) Jan Fröhlich (Denmark) Carsten Loesch	21–11, 21–17	Gold	
2017	40+	Auckland Badminton Centre; Auckland, New Zealand	(Indonesia) Effendy Widjaja	(Indonesia) Tri Kusharjanto (Indonesia) Hariyanto Arbi	20–22, 14–21	Silver	

=== World Senior Championships ===
Men's doubles
Year	Age	Venue	Partner	Opponent	Score	Result	Ref.
2015	35+	Helsingborg Arena; Helsingborg, Sweden	(Indonesia) Flandy Limpele	(Thailand) Naruenart Chuaymak (Thailand) Apichai Thiraratsakul	21–13, 21–9	Gold	
2023	45+	Hwasan Indoor Stadium; Jeonju, South Korea	(Indonesia) Tri Kusharjanto	(Thailand) Naruenart Chuaymak (Thailand) Thaweesak Koetsriphan	21–14, 21–13	Gold	
2025	40+	Eastern National Sports Training Centre; Pattaya, Thailand	(Indonesia) Hendra Setiawan	(Thailand) Boonsak Ponsana (Thailand) Jakrapan Thanathiratham	21–18, 21–16	Gold	

Mixed doubles
Year	Age	Venue	Partner	Opponent	Score	Result	Ref.
2025	45+	Eastern National Sports Training Centre; Pattaya, Thailand	(England) Rebecca Pantaney	(Japan) Hosemari Fujimoto (Japan) Fumika Hashimoto	15–21, 18–21	Bronze	

=== Pan American Games ===
Men's doubles
Year	Venue	Partner	Opponent	Score	Result	Ref.
2011	Multipurpose Gymnasium; Guadalajara, Mexico	(United States) Howard Bach	(United States) Halim Haryanto (United States) Sattawat Pongnairat	21–10, 21–14	Gold	

=== Asian Championships ===
Men's doubles
Year	Venue	Partner	Opponent	Score	Result
2000	Istora Senayan; Jakarta, Indonesia	(Indonesia) Rexy Mainaky	(Malaysia) Choong Tan Fook (Malaysia) Lee Wan Wah	15–8, 15–9	Gold
2001	PhilSports Arena, Manila, Philippines	(Indonesia) Candra Wijaya	(Indonesia) Tri Kusharjanto (Indonesia) Bambang Suprianto	15–8, 13–15, 13–15	Silver

=== Asian Cup ===
Men's doubles
Year	Venue	Partner	Opponent	Score	Result	Ref.
1996	Olympic Gymnasium No. 2 Seoul, South Korea	(Indonesia) Rudy Wijaya	(South Korea) Kim Dong-moon (South Korea) Yoo Yong-sung	10–15, 8–15	Silver	

=== SEA Games ===
Men's doubles
Year	Venue	Partner	Opponent	Score	Result	Ref.
2001	Malawati Stadium; Selangor, Malaysia	(Indonesia) Bambang Suprianto	(Indonesia) Candra Wijaya (Indonesia) Sigit Budiarto	4–15, 6–15	Silver	

=== BWF Superseries (1 title, 4 runners-up) ===
The BWF Superseries, which was launched on December 14, 2006 and implemented in 2007, is a series of elite badminton tournaments, sanctioned by the Badminton World Federation (BWF). BWF Superseries levels are Superseries and Superseries Premier. A season of Superseries consists of twelve tournaments around the world that have been introduced since 2011. Successful players are invited to the Superseries Finals, which are held at the end of each year.

Men's doubles
Year	Tournament	Partner	Opponent	Score	Result	Ref.
2007	Malaysia Open	(Indonesia) Candra Wijaya	(Malaysia) Koo Kien Keat (Malaysia) Tan Boon Heong	15–21, 18–21	(silver) Runner-up	
2007	Japan Open	(Indonesia) Candra Wijaya	(Indonesia) Luluk Hadiyanto (Indonesia) Alvent Yulianto	21–18, 21–17	(gold) Winner	
2007	Hong Kong Open	(Indonesia) Candra Wijaya	(Indonesia) Markis Kido (Indonesia) Hendra Setiawan	12–21, 21–18, 13–21	(silver) Runner-up	
2008	Indonesia Open	(Indonesia) Candra Wijaya	(Malaysia) Mohd Zakry Abdul Latif (Malaysia) Mohd Fairuzizuan Mohd Tazari	21–19, 18–21, 14–21	(silver) Runner-up	
2010	Singapore Open	(United States) Howard Bach	(Chinese Taipei) Fang Chieh-min (Chinese Taipei) Lee Sheng-mu	14–21, 15–21	(silver) Runner-up	

BWF Super Series Finals tournament
BWF Super Series Premier tournament
BWF Super Series tournament

=== IBF/BWF Grand Prix (29 titles, 8 runners-up) ===
The BWF Grand Prix had two levels, the BWF Grand Prix and Grand Prix Gold. It was a series of badminton tournaments sanctioned by the Badminton World Federation (BWF) which was held from 2007 to 2017. The World Badminton Grand Prix sanctioned by International Badminton Federation (IBF) from 1983 to 2006.

Men's doubles
Year	Tournament	Partner	Opponent	Score	Result
1995	Russian Open	(Indonesia) Rudy Wijaya	(Denmark) Thomas Lund (Denmark) Jon Holst-Christensen	8–15, 15–11, 14–17	(silver) Runner-up
1995	Denmark Open	(Indonesia) Rudy Wijaya	(Denmark) Thomas Lund (Denmark) Jon Holst-Christensen	17–16, 5–15, 6–15	(silver) Runner-up
1997	Polish Open	(Indonesia) Victo Wibowo	(Indonesia) Rudy Wijaya (Indonesia) Seng Kok Keong	15–11, 15–6	(gold) Winner
1998	Swedish Open	(Indonesia) Candra Wijaya	(China) Yang Ming (China) Zhang Jun	15–3, 15–6	(gold) Winner
1998	All England Open	(Indonesia) Candra Wijaya	(South Korea) Lee Dong-soo (South Korea) Yoo Yong-sung	10–15, 10–15	(silver) Runner-up
1998	Malaysia Open	(Indonesia) Halim Haryanto	(China) Liu Yong (China) Yu Jinhao	6–15, 15–5, 15–11	(gold) Winner
1998	Brunei Open	(Indonesia) Halim Haryanto	(Denmark) Michael Søgaard (Indonesia) Denny Kantono	15–2, 15–8	(gold) Winner
1998	Hong Kong Open	(Indonesia) Candra Wijaya	(Denmark) Jens Eriksen (Denmark) Jesper Larsen	15–10, 15–9	(gold) Winner
1998	World Grand Prix Finals	(Indonesia) Halim Haryanto	(Indonesia) Antonius Ariantho (Indonesia) Denny Kantono	11–15, 15–5, 11–15	(silver) Runner-up
1999	All England Open	(Indonesia) Candra Wijaya	(South Korea) Lee Dong-soo (South Korea) Yoo Yong-sung	15–7, 15–5	(gold) Winner
1999	Malaysia Open	(Indonesia) Candra Wijaya	(Indonesia) Eng Hian (Indonesia) Flandy Limpele	15–6, 15–11	(gold) Winner
1999	Singapore Open	(Indonesia) Candra Wijaya	(Malaysia) Choong Tan Fook (Malaysia) Lee Wan Wah	7–15, 15–14, 12–15	(silver) Runner-up
1999	Indonesia Open	(Indonesia) Candra Wijaya	(Indonesia) Rexy Mainaky (Indonesia) Ricky Subagja	12–15, 8–15	(silver) Runner-up
1999	World Grand Prix Finals	(Indonesia) Candra Wijaya	(South Korea) Ha Tae-kwon (South Korea) Kim Dong-moon	15–7, 8–15, 15–11	(gold) Winner
2000	Chinese Taipei Open	(Indonesia) Candra Wijaya	(Malaysia) Cheah Soon Kit (Malaysia) Yap Kim Hock	15–7, 15–7	(gold) Winner
2000	Japan Open	(Indonesia) Candra Wijaya	(South Korea) Lee Dong-soo (South Korea) Yoo Yong-sung	15–6, 15–7	(gold) Winner
2000	Indonesia Open	(Indonesia) Candra Wijaya	(Indonesia) Eng Hian (Indonesia) Flandy Limpele	14–17, 15–8, 15–8	(gold) Winner
2000	World Grand Prix Finals	(Indonesia) Candra Wijaya	(Indonesia) Sigit Budiarto (Indonesia) Halim Haryanto	7–5, 8–6, 7–2	(gold) Winner
2002	U.S. Open	(United States) Khan Malaythong	(United States) Howard Bach (United States) Kevin Han	11–15, 15–7, 15–7	(gold) Winner
2002	Puerto Rico Open	(United States) Khan Malaythong	(Spain) José Antonio Crespo (Spain) Sergio Llopis	15–6, 15–3	(gold) Winner
2003	U.S. Open	(United States) Khan Malaythong	(Chinese Taipei) Lee Sung-yuan (Chinese Taipei) Lin Wei-hsiang	6–15, 15–4, 15–5	(gold) Winner
2004	U.S. Open	(United States) Howard Bach	(Denmark) Mathias Boe (Denmark) Carsten Mogensen	15–5, 15–7	(gold) Winner
2004	Dutch Open	(United States) Howard Bach	(Denmark) Thomas Laybourn (Denmark) Peter Steffensen	15–8, 15–7	(gold) Winner
2005	Bitburger Open	(United States) Halim Haryanto	(Canada) Mike Beres (Canada) William Milroy	15–3, 15–6	(gold) Winner
2005	Chinese Taipei Open	(United States) Halim Haryanto	(Denmark) Mathias Boe (Denmark) Carsten Mogensen	15–13, 15–13	(gold) Winner
2006	Korea Open	(Indonesia) Candra Wijaya	(South Korea) Hwang Ji-man (South Korea) Lee Jae-jin	21–18, 21–18	(gold) Winner
2006	Indonesia Open	(Indonesia) Candra Wijaya	(Indonesia) Markis Kido (Indonesia) Hendra Setiawan	21–11, 21–16	(gold) Winner
2006	U.S. Open	(United States) Halim Haryanto	(Russia) Vitalij Durkin (Russia) Aleksandr Nikolaenko	21–10, 21–19	(gold) Winner
2006	Japan Open	(Indonesia) Candra Wijaya	(Malaysia) Koo Kien Keat (Malaysia) Tan Boon Heong	21–15, 21–14	(gold) Winner
2008	Chinese Taipei Open	(Indonesia) Candra Wijaya	(Denmark) Mathias Boe (Denmark) Carsten Mogensen	14–21, 20–22	(silver) Runner-up
2009	U.S. Open	(United States) Howard Bach	(Austria) Jürgen Koch (Austria) Peter Zauner	21–12, 21–9	(gold) Winner
2011	U.S. Open	(United States) Howard Bach	(South Korea) Ko Sung-hyun (South Korea) Lee Yong-dae	9–21, 19–21	(silver) Runner-up

Mixed doubles
Year	Tournament	Partner	Opponent	Score	Result
2002	U.S. Open	(Indonesia) Etty Tantri	(England) Simon Archer (Sweden) Marina Andrievskaya	7–11, 11–4, 11–6	(gold) Winner
2002	Puerto Rico Open	(United States) Mesinee Mangkalakiri	(Netherlands) Tjitte Weistra (Peru) Doriana Rivera	11–2, 11–3	(gold) Winner
2003	U.S. Open	(United States) Etty Tantri	(South Korea) Hwang Ji-man (South Korea) Lee Eun-woo	15–5, 15–9	(gold) Winner
2005	Chinese Taipei Open	(Chinese Taipei) Cheng Wen-hsing	(Indonesia) Devin Lahardi Fitriawan (Indonesia) Vita Marissa	17–15, 15–6	(gold) Winner
2012	U.S. Open	(Indonesia) Vita Marissa	(Japan) Kenichi Hayakawa (Japan) Misaki Matsutomo	21–13, 21–10	(gold) Winner

=== IBF/BWF International Challenge/Series (8 titles, 2 runners-up) ===
Men's singles
Year	Tournament	Opponent	Score	Result
2005	U.S. International	(Chinese Taipei) Hsieh Yu-hsing	2–15, 2–15	(silver) Runner-up

Men's doubles
Year	Tournament	Partner	Opponent	Score	Result
1997	French International	(Indonesia) Victo Wibowo	(Indonesia) Davis Efraim (Indonesia) Halim Haryanto	15–10, 15–8	(gold) Winner
2002	Southern Pan Am Classic	(United States) Khan Malaythong	(Canada) Philippe Bourret (Canada) Alexandre Tremblay	15–4, 15–4	(gold) Winner
2005	SCBA International	(United States) Howard Bach	(United States) Raju Rai (United States) Khan Malaythong	1–0 Retired	(gold) Winner
2005	U.S. International	(United States) Howard Bach	(Canada) Mike Beres (Canada) William Milroy	15–1, 15–2	(gold) Winner
2011	Peru International	(United States) Howard Bach	(Canada) Adrian Liu (Canada) Derrick Ng	21–10, 21–9	(gold) Winner
2012	Peru International	(United States) Howard Bach	(Canada) Adrian Liu (Canada) Derrick Ng	13–21, 21–13, 21–9	(gold) Winner
2017	U.S. International	(United States) Vinson Chiu	(Germany) Daniel Benz (Germany) Andreas Heinz	16–21, 21–14, 21–14	(gold) Winner

Mixed doubles
Year	Tournament	Partner	Opponent	Score	Result	Ref.
2002	USA Southern Pan Am International	(United States) Mesinee Mangkalakiri	(Canada) Philippe Bourret (Canada) Denyse Julien	11–3, 11–5	(gold) Winner	
2016	Manhattan Beach International	(United States) Mirabelle Huang	(Indonesia) David Yedija Pohan (Indonesia) Jenna Gozali	15–21, 13–21	(silver) Runner-up	

=== IBF International (1 runner-up) ===
Boys' singles
Year	Tournament	Opponent	Score	Result	Ref.
1994	German Junior	(Indonesia) Jeffer Rosobin		(silver) Runner-up	

=== Invitational tournaments ===
Men's doubles
Year	Tournament	Partner	Opponent	Score	Result	Ref.
1997	Copenhagen Masters	(Indonesia) Candra Wijaya	(England) Simon Archer (England) Chris Hunt	15–13, 15–8	(gold) Winner	
1999	Ipoh Masters	(Indonesia) Candra Wijaya	(Indonesia) Flandy Limpele (Indonesia) Eng Hian	15–11, 15–9	(gold) Winner	
2000	Copenhagen Masters	(Indonesia) Halim Haryanto	(Indonesia) Flandy Limpele (Indonesia) Eng Hian	7–8, 7–5, 4–7, 7–5, 5–7	(silver) Runner-up	
2005	Copenhagen Masters	(United States) Howard Bach	(China) Cai Yun (China) Fu Haifeng	15–12, 11–15, 15–4	(gold) Winner	

== Performance timeline ==
=== Indonesian team ===
- Senior level

Team Events	1998
Asian Games	Gold

Team Events	2000
Thomas Cup	Gold

=== Individual competitions ===
- Senior level

Event	1997	1999	2001	2003	2005	2006	2007	2009	2010	2011
BWF World Championships	R3	QF	Gold	A	Gold	A	QF	QF	R1	R1

Event	2000	2004	2008	2012
Olympics	Gold	A	A	GS
