= Jim Ronny Andersen =

Norwegian badminton player (born 1975)

Personal information
- Born: 4 May 1975 (age 51) Songdalen Municipality, Vest-Agder, Norway
- Height: 1.77 m (5 ft 10 in)
- Weight: 78 kg (172 lb)

Sport
- Country: Norway
- Sport: Badminton
- Handedness: Right
- Event: Men's singles

Men's singles
- BWF profile
Medal record
Men's badminton
Representing Norway
World Senior Championships
Bronze medal – third place	2011 Richmond	Men's singles 35+
Bronze medal – third place	2015 Helsingborg	Men's singles 35+

Jim Ronny Andersen (born 4 May 1975) is a Norwegian badminton player. He is the bronze medalists at the 2011 and 2015 World Senior Championships in the men's singles 35+ event.

== Career ==
Andersen played badminton at the 2004 Summer Olympics in men's singles, defeating Pedro Yang of Guatemala in the first round. In the round of 16, Andersen was defeated by Soni Dwi Kuncoro of Indonesia. In his home country he won 16 titles at the Norwegian National Championships.

== Achievements ==
=== World Senior Championships ===
Year	Venue	Event	Opponent	Score	Result
2011	Richmond Olympic Oval, Richmond, Canada	Men's singles 35+	(Denmark) Carsten Loesch	19–21, 14–21	Bronze
2015	Helsingborg Arena, Helsingborg, Sweden	Men's singles 35+	(Germany) Thorsten Hukriede	21–8, 22–24, 12–21	Bronze

=== IBF International ===
Men's singles

Year	Tournament	Opponent	Score	Result
1998	São Paulo International	(Wales) Richard Vaughan	6–15, 8–15	(silver) Runner-up
1999	São Paulo International	(Hong Kong) Ng Wei	11–15, 9–15	(silver) Runner-up
1999	Mexico International	(Indonesia) Ardy Wiranata	15–11, 8–15, 4–15	(silver) Runner-up
2000	Norwegian International	(Sweden) Daniel Eriksson	15–7, 13–15, 15–9	(gold) Winner
2001	Strasbourg International			(gold) Winner
2002	Slovenian International	(Austria) Jürgen Koch	6–15, 4–15	(silver) Runner-up
2004	Iceland International	(Canada) Bobby Milroy	10–15, 12–15	(silver) Runner-up
