= Tjitte Weistra =

Dutch badminton player (born 1975)

Personal information
- Born: 2 December 1975 (age 50)
- Height: 1.85 m (6 ft 1 in)

Sport
- Country: Netherlands (1975–2001); Peru (2001–2004); New Zealand (2004–2018); Australia (2019–present)
- Sport: Badminton

Men's singles & doubles
- Highest ranking: 21 (MS 2001); 160 (MD 13 September 2012); 23 (XD 2001)
- BWF profile

Tjitte Weistra (born 2 December 1975) is a badminton player from the Netherlands. He became a Peruvian badminton national coach from 2002 to 2004, then in April 2004 he moved to New Zealand as a coach in Waikato Badminton Association. He moved to Mornington, Australia in 2019, and now works as Chief Executive Officer Badminton Australia.

== Career achievements ==
Year	Tournament	Event	Result	Names
1995	Puerto Rico International	MD	Winner	Tjitte Weistra / Cosmin Ioan
1997	Scottish Open	MS	Winner	Tjitte Weistra
2000	Chile International	MS	Winner	Tjitte Weistra
2001	Puerto Rico International	XD	Winner	Tjitte Weistra / Lorena Blanco
2001	Puerto Rico International	MD	Winner	Tjitte Weistra / Cosmin Ioan
2001	Puerto Rico International	MS	Winner	Tjitte Weistra
2001	Peru International	XD	Winner	Tjitte Weistra / Doriana Rivera
2001	Peru International	MS	Winner	Tjitte Weistra
2002	Peru International	XD	Winner	Tjitte Weistra / Doriana Rivera
2002	Mexico International	XD	Winner	Tjitte Weistra / Doriana Rivera
2002	Carebaco International	XD	Winner	Tjitte Weistra / Doriana Rivera
2002	Peru International	MS	Winner	Tjitte Weistra
2002	Mexico International	MS	Winner	Tjitte Weistra
2002	Carebaco International	MS	Winner	Tjitte Weistra
