= Rebecca Pantaney =

English badminton player

Personal information
- Born: 7 October 1975 (age 50)
- Height: 157 cm (5 ft 2 in)

Sport
- Country: England
- Sport: Badminton
- Handedness: Right
- BWF profile
Medal record
Badminton
Representing England
World Senior Championships
Bronze medal – third place	2025 Pattaya	Women's doubles 45+
Bronze medal – third place	2025 Pattaya	Mixed doubles 45+
Commonwealth Games
Gold medal – first place	1998 Kuala Lumpur	Women's team

Rebecca Pantaney (born 7 October 1975) is an English badminton player. She won gold for England in the women's team event at the 1998 Commonwealth Games.

As a coach she has also traveled to the Falkland Islands where she has coached players at the Stanley Badminton Club, as well as taking them to the Island Games, the 2010 Commonwealth Games in Delhi, India, the 2014 Commonwealth Games in Glasgow, Scotland, and the 27th Brazil Badminton International Cup, in São Paulo, Brazil.

She was chosen to be one of the torchbearers for the 2012 Summer Olympics torch relay, carrying the torch across the Clifton Suspension Bridge into Bristol.

== Achievements ==
=== World Senior Championships ===
Women's doubles

Year	Age	Venue	Partner	Opponent	Score	Result	Ref
2025	45+	Eastern National Sports Training Centre, Pattaya, Thailand	(England) Lynne Swan	(Japan) Fumika Hashimoto (Japan) Akiko Nakashima	6–21, 10–21	Bronze	

Mixed doubles

Year	Age	Venue	Partner	Opponent	Score	Result	Ref
2025	45+	Eastern National Sports Training Centre, Pattaya, Thailand	(United States) Tony Gunawan	(Japan) Hosemari Fujimoto (Japan) Fumika Hashimoto	15–21, 18–21	Bronze	
