= Helsingborg Arena =

Arena in Helsingborg, Sweden

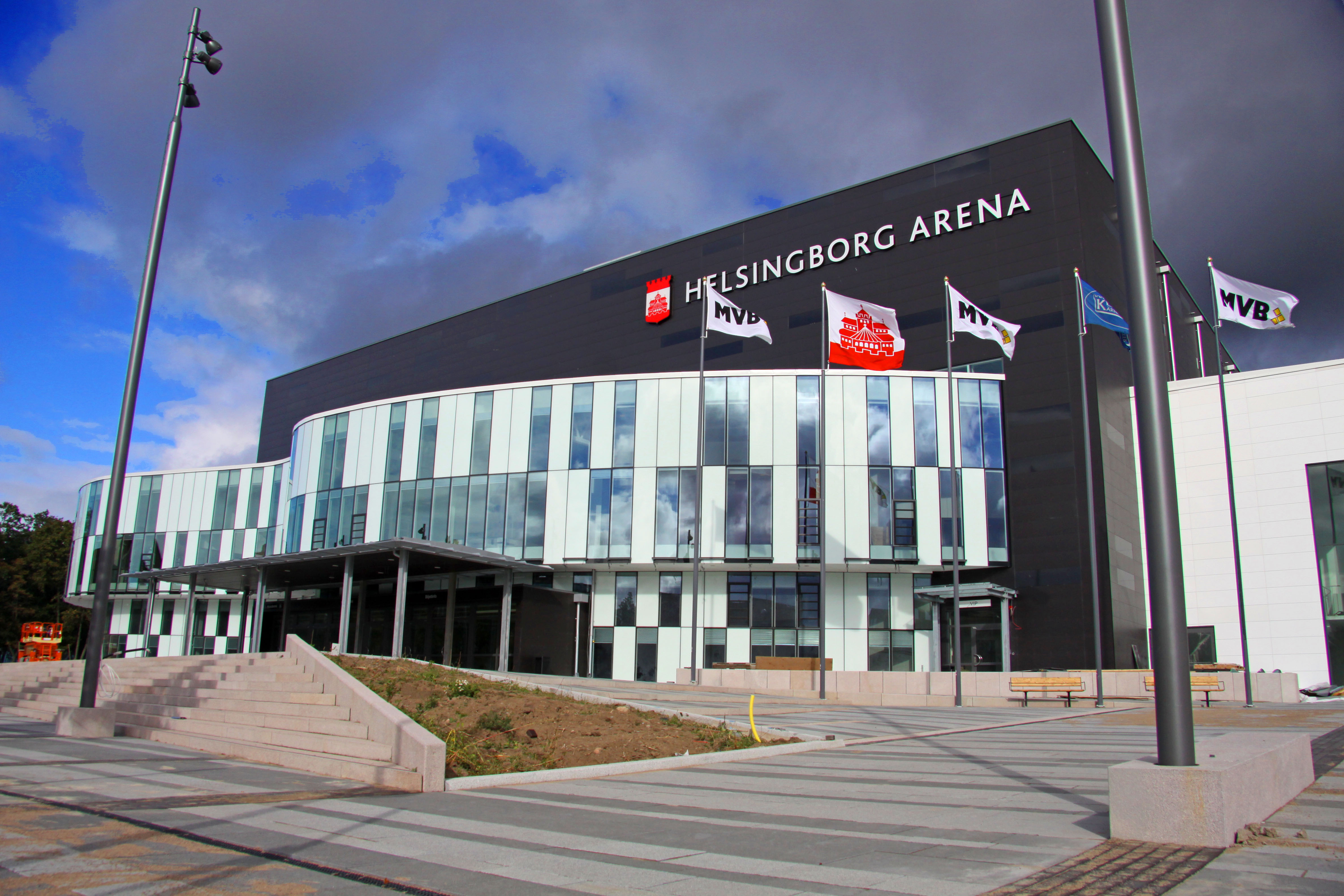
- Interactive map of Helsingborg Arena
- Location: Helsingborg, Sweden
- Coordinates: 56.0530°N 12.7043°E
- Owner: City of Helsingborg
- Capacity: 5,000 (handball); 300 (hall 2); 100 (hall 3)

Construction
- Groundbreaking: September 2010
- Opened: November 2012
- Cost: SEK 411,5; EUR € 48,5 million
- Architect: Sweco

Tenants
- OV Helsingborg HK (handball) (2012–present); FC Helsingborg (floorball) (2012–present); European Women's Handball (2016)

Helsingborg Arena is a multipurpose arena in Helsingborg, Sweden, run by and associated with the municipal companies Helsingborg Events and Idrottspark AB and Helsingborg Arena and Scen AB, respectively.

== History ==
Plans for the new arena began in 2005. It was designed by the engineering consultancy company Sweco AB. The inauguration of the arena took place on 30 November 2012. The arena was funded by the Henry and Gerda Dunker Foundation, established by the late businessman and philanthropist Henry Dunker (1870–1962).

Helsingborg Arena has a floor area of 21,000 square meters and a ceiling height of at most 15 meters. The arena holds a maximum of 5,500 spectators at concerts and 4,700 spectators at sporting events.

== See also ==
- List of indoor arenas in Sweden
