= 2025 BWF World Senior Championships – 40+ =

Tournament details
- Dates: 7 September 2025 – 14 September 2025
- Edition: 12
- Level: International
- Competitors: 269 from 31 nations
- Venue: Eastern National Sports Training Centre
- Location: Pattaya, Thailand

Champions
- Men's singles: (Malaysia) Ooi Swee Khoon
- Women's singles: (Thailand) Molthila Kitjanon
- Men's doubles: (United States) Tony Gunawan (Indonesia) Hendra Setiawan
- Women's doubles: (Iceland) Drífa Harðardóttir (Denmark) Gry Hermansen
- Mixed doubles: (Indonesia) Muhammad Muhammad (Canada) Jody Patrick

These are the results of 2025 BWF World Senior Championships' 40+ events.

== Competition schedule ==
Competition schedule was announced at 31 August 2025:

Key
| #R | #th round | QF | Quarter-finals | SF | Semi-finals | F | Final |

| Event | Sep 7 9:00 | Sep 8 9:00 | Sep 9 9:00 | Sep 10 9:00 | Sep 11 9:00 | Sep 12 10:00 | Sep 13 10:00 | Sep 14 10:00 |
|---|---|---|---|---|---|---|---|---|
| Men's singles | 1R | | 2R | 3R | 4R | QF | SF | F |
| Women's singles | | 1R | | 2R | 3R | QF | SF | F |
| Men's doubles | | 1R | | 2R | 3R | QF | SF | F |
| Women's doubles | | 1R | | 2R | 3R | QF | SF | F |
| Mixed doubles | 1R | | 2R | | 3R | QF | SF | F |

== Summary ==
=== Medal table ===
* Host nation (Thailand)

2025 BWF World Senior Championships medal table
| Rank | Nation | Gold | Silver | Bronze | Total |
|---|---|---|---|---|---|
| 1 | Thailand* | 1 | 1 | 0 | 2 |
| 2 | Indonesia | 1 | 0.5 | 1 | 2.5 |
| 3 | Malaysia | 1 | 0 | 0 | 1 |
| 4 | Canada | 0.5 | 0 | 1 | 1.5 |
| 4 | Denmark | 0.5 | 0 | 1 | 1.5 |
| 6 | Iceland | 0.5 | 0 | 0 | 0.5 |
| 6 | United States | 0.5 | 0 | 0 | 0.5 |
| 8 | Chinese Taipei | 0 | 1 | 2 | 3 |
| 9 | Japan | 0 | 1 | 0 | 1 |
| 9 | Romania | 0 | 1 | 0 | 1 |
| 11 | Sri Lanka | 0 | 0.5 | 0 | 0.5 |
| 12 | England | 0 | 0 | 1 | 1 |
| 12 | Finland | 0 | 0 | 1 | 1 |
| 12 | Hong Kong | 0 | 0 | 1 | 1 |
| 12 | India | 0 | 0 | 1 | 1 |
| 12 | Poland | 0 | 0 | 1 | 1 |
| Totals (16 entries) | | 5 | 5 | 10 | 20 |

=== Medalists ===
| Event | Gold | Silver | Bronze |
|---|---|---|---|
| Men's singles | (Malaysia) Ooi Swee Khoon | (Japan) Daichi Hanamoto | (England) Joel Gayle |
| Men's singles | (Malaysia) Ooi Swee Khoon | (Japan) Daichi Hanamoto | (Indonesia) Muhammad Muhammad |
| Women's singles | (Thailand) Molthila Kitjanon | (Chinese Taipei) Huang Chia-hsin | (Hong Kong) Fung Ying |
| Women's singles | (Thailand) Molthila Kitjanon | (Chinese Taipei) Huang Chia-hsin | (Denmark) Christina Aagaard |
| Men's doubles | (United States) Tony Gunawan (Indonesia) Hendra Setiawan | (Thailand) Boonsak Ponsana (Thailand) Jakrapan Thanathiratham | (Chinese Taipei) Chang Chih-shin (Chinese Taipei) Wang Chih-kai |
| Men's doubles | (United States) Tony Gunawan (Indonesia) Hendra Setiawan | (Thailand) Boonsak Ponsana (Thailand) Jakrapan Thanathiratham | (Poland) Michał Łogosz (Poland) Przemysław Wacha |
| Women's doubles | (Iceland) Drífa Harðardóttir^{‡} (Denmark) Gry Hermansen | (Romania) Florentina Constantinescu (Romania) Irina Popescu | (Canada) Jody Patrick (Canada) Lindsay Reynolds |
| Women's doubles | (Iceland) Drífa Harðardóttir^{‡} (Denmark) Gry Hermansen | (Romania) Florentina Constantinescu (Romania) Irina Popescu | (Chinese Taipei) Teng Tao-chun (Chinese Taipei) Tsai Hui-min |
| Mixed doubles | (Indonesia) Muhammad Muhammad (Canada) Jody Patrick^{‡} | (Indonesia) Unang Rahmat^{‡} (Sri Lanka) Nadeesha Gayanthi | (Finland) Jesper von Hertzen (Finland) Emmi Heikkinen |
| Mixed doubles | (Indonesia) Muhammad Muhammad (Canada) Jody Patrick^{‡} | (Indonesia) Unang Rahmat^{‡} (Sri Lanka) Nadeesha Gayanthi | (India) Shetty Abhinand (India) Sangeetha Mari |

== Participants ==
269 players from 31 nations competed at this edition of the championships:

Participants
| Australia (1) | Santhoshkumar Dora |
| Austria (2) | Roland Bauer ^{‡}; Nicoleta Tiron |
| Canada (3) | Arak Bhokanandh; Jody Patrick ^{‡}; Lindsay Reynolds |
| Chinese Taipei (24) | Chang Chih-shin; Chao Chun-ken; Chen Huang-cheng; Chen Ya-shan; Cheng Yu-chen; Ho Chun-hao ^{‡}; Hu Yu-ling; Huang Chia-hsin; Lan Chen-hao; Li Cho-chun; Liao Sheng-shiun; Liu Sheng-hu; Liu Shu-chih; Lu Man-ching ^{‡}; Lu Yang-ching; Teng Tao-chun; Tsai Hui-min ^{‡}; Tsao Tsai-chun ^{‡}; Tu Kai-sheng; Wang Chih-kai; Wei Wei-ming ^{‡}; Wu En-jin; Yeh Chun-nien ^{‡}; Yu Keng-chi |
| Denmark (8) | Christina Aagaard; Gry Hermansen; Søren Hermansen; Lars Klintrup ^{‡}; Casper Lund ^{‡}; Jacob Marcussen; Ulla Pedersen ^{‡}; Ove Svejstrup ^{‡} |
| England (10) | Andrew Aspinal; Suzanne Brewer; Joel Gayle; Anna Kondratieva ^{‡}; Mark Law; Paul Le Tocq; Laura Light; Alison Meijers; Neil Place ^{‡}; David Williams |
| Finland (6) | Hannu Aro; Emmi Heikkinen ^{‡}; Jarmo Raninen; Tuomas Saranen; Lauri Valli ^{‡}; Jesper von Hertzen |
| France (11) | Alan Bertolla; Marc de la Giroday; Hélène Dijoux; Quentin Gallet; Céline Heude; Anthony Martin; Aurélie Peregrina ^{‡}; Audrey Petit; David Prigent; Mathieu Seignez; Nicolas Séjournant |
| Germany (14) | Nicole Bartsch; Senja Dewes; Fabian Dietrich; Fabian Disić; Pascal Histel; Nina Kaack; Tinna Kähler ^{‡}; Tina Marke; Michael Prinz; Frank Schlosser; Ayfer Taskin; Stefan Tatar ^{‡}; Carsten Teschner; Sebastian Trautloff |
| Hong Kong (18) | Chan Pui Chi; Chan Tsz Kin ^{‡}; Cheung Chi Cheuk; Cheung Chung Fai; Vera Choy; Fung Sin Kei; Fung Ying; Kwok Sau Foon; Lam Shun Chuen; Leung Wing Tat; Li Wing Mui ^{‡}; Winnoc Lui; Mak Chi Keung; Ng Chor Kwan; Tam Kai Yeung; Wong Man Ching; Yan Chun Yu; Yu Hiu Man |
| Iceland (1) | Drífa Harðardóttir ^{‡} |
| India (22) | Shetty Abhinand; Diva Arora; Arup Baidya; Mayank Behal; Manisha Bhawatkar; Devinder Dhillon ^{‡}; Manjiri Dhoke; Hemant Duggal; Mala Gaba; Manish Gupta; Radhika Ingalhalikar; Jayan James; Aditya Kale; Antony Kattapurath; Lalduhzuali; Sangeetha Mari; Sandhya Melasheemi; Amrita Mukherjee; Pankaj Naithani; Rajesh Navaneethakrishnan; Lalramtluangi Ponty ^{‡}; ~~Aditi Rode~~ ^{w}; Devendra Thapa |
| Indonesia (9) | Effendy Djaja; Jacintha Tabalujan Herzog; Meiliana Jauhari; Hendra Joseph; Muhammad Muhammad; Unang Rahmat ^{‡}; Christovel Oswald Runkat; Hendra Setiawan; Yusuf Suwandi Sie ^{‡} |
| Japan (15) | Hirofumi Fujino; Daichi Hanamoto; Mineo Higashi; Nobuyuki Ishihara; Kazuhiro Ishikawa ^{‡}; Miyuki Kasai ^{‡}; Ayako Kawashima; Hiroshi Mine; Takanori Morinaga; Sayaka Nunome; Kenta Sakai; Satoshi Ueno; Sayaka Ueyama; Kazuto Watanabe; Motohiro Yamasaki |
| Malaysia (13) | Nik Abdullah; Nancy Clarissa; Foo Woon Lung ^{‡}; Khor Bak Kar; Law Yen Yang; Lim Chen Wet; Victor Loh ^{‡}; Moo Kok Hsiung; Ooi Swee Khoon; George Rowena; Teoh Zhen Ye; Yan Wan Leng; Yeo Gee Keing; ~~See Phui Leng~~ ^{w} |
| Mexico (2) | Jesús López ^{‡}; Juan Sañudo |
| Mongolia (1) | Dashdavaa Davaasuren |
| New Zealand (2) | Robert Batty; Alfred Wong ^{‡} |
| Norway (1) | Maren Formo |
| Poland (14) | Dominika Cygan; Andrzej Gasz; Dominika Guzik-Płuchowska ^{‡}; Adam Kosz ^{‡}; Agata Kornacka; Kamila Kowalska; Dawid Krawiec ^{‡}; Michał Łogosz ^{‡}; Magdalena Nielsen ^{‡}; Izabela Pazyna; Michał Suski ^{‡}; Przemysław Wacha; Katarzyna Wilk ^{‡}; Iwona Zakrzewska |
| Romania (4) | Robert Ciobotaru; Daniel Cojocaru ^{‡}; Florentina Constantinescu; Irina Popescu |
| Scotland (2) | Siddhartha Singh; Daniel Smith ^{‡} |
| Singapore (9) | Chew Wei Yin; Jane Chiang ^{‡}; Vivek Chotteyandamada; Charles Loh; Marcus Loo; Ng Kok Keong ^{‡}; Tan Shin Hui; Wu Run Xiang; Yap Chun Wei |
| Spain (9) | Beatriz Garcia; Jon Hernández; David Hernansanz; Sergio Latorre; Sebastián López; Luis Antonio Morcillo ^{‡}; Cristina Puebla; Silvia Rueda; Vanessa Serrano |
| Sri Lanka (12) | Priyanka Abeyrathne ^{‡}; Asanka de Silva ^{‡}; Nalin Fernando; Nadeesha Gayanthi; Aravinda Jayalath ^{‡}; Nishantha Jayamanne ^{‡}; Hasika Mahindarathe; Umanga Rathnayake; Sandamali Senanayaka; Lasantha Thilakawardana; Sahan Pradeep Withana ^{‡}; Amila Yatapana |
| Sweden (4) | Tomas Ahlgren; Tomas Lif; Cecilia Närfors; Fredrik Nilebring |
| Switzerland (5) | Thomas Bless; Jan Fröhlich; Pranav Shashank Khot; Ava Monney; Kai Waldenberger |
| Thailand (28) | Supachoke Bumrungpun; Saisamol Chattanupakorn; Krid Chuaynarong; Pornpimol Faythet; Thipwalee Jaruhirunskul; Jenrop Jenjitranont; Supanut Kantarapisan; Kannika Khampachue; Molthila Kitjanon; Patjamporn Kongukos; Thitipong Lapho; Ajjamaporn Luangsuwan; Rattasart Narong; Vasin Nilyok; Siraroj Panpachara; Chawanwit Pocharoen; Boonsak Ponsana; Salakjit Ponsana; Ittikorn Punyangam; Pusanavat Saisirivit; Mattika Samitsomboon; Baramee Tangkeerati; Keeraya Tangkeerati; Jakrapan Thanathiratham; Machima Thongdejsri; Kamonwan Winyoowijak; Peerasak Wiriyaphadungphong; Waraporn Worawong |
| Ukraine (3) | Nataliia Igronova; Vlas Isaenko; Mykola Shkliaiev |
| United Arab Emirates (11) | Abdul Abubacker; Veettikka Ali; Yasir Arafath ^{‡}; Rohith Haridas; Amritha Kuttikrishnan; Abdul Vahab Manadi; Donney Mathew ^{‡}; Arshad Pookunju; Arun Retnakaran; Vicente Reyes; Sachin Raman Seth |
| United States (5) | Tony Gunawan ^{‡}; Rajesh Mariappan; Anshuman Mishra ^{‡}; Neha Saxena; Ajit Umrani ^{‡} |
^‡ : Participant born before 1980; ^w : Withdrawn.

== Legends ==
| ^{‡} | Participant who was born before 1980. |
| ^{?} | Unknown date of birth. |
| ^{r} | Retired during the match. |

== Men's singles ==
=== Seeds ===
1. (Japan) Daichi Hanamoto (silver medalist)
2. (Chinese Taipei) Chao Chun-ken (fourth round)
3. (Finland) Hannu Aro (second round)
4. (Indonesia) Muhammad Muhammad (bronze medalist)
5. (Switzerland) Jan Fröhlich (fourth round)
6. (India) Mayank Behal (fourth round)
7. (England) Andrew Aspinal (third round)
8. (Ukraine) Mykola Shkliaiev (third round)
9. (Hong Kong) Ng Chor Kwan (third round)
10. (Germany) Michael Prinz (third round)
11. (France) Mathieu Seignez (third round)
12. (Denmark) Søren Hermansen (quarter-finals)
13. (England) Paul Le Tocq (third round)
14. (Japan) Mineo Higashi (fourth round)
15. (Germany) Pascal Histel (third round)
16. (Switzerland) Kai Waldenberger (quarter-finals)

=== Finals ===
Quarter-finals
1 | (Japan) Daichi Hanamoto | 21 | 21
9/16 | (Switzerland) Kai Waldenberger | 16 | 11
(Thailand) Jenrop Jenjitranont | 11 | 17
(England) Joel Gayle | 21 | 21
(Ukraine) Vlas Isaenko | 5 | 8
3/4 | (Indonesia) Muhammad Muhammad | 21 | 21
5/8 | (Denmark) Søren Hermansen | 15 | 13
(Malaysia) Ooi Swee Khoon | 21 | 21

Semi-finals
1 | (Japan) Daichi Hanamoto | 21 | 8
(England) Joel Gayle | 14 | 3^{r}
3/4 | (Indonesia) Muhammad Muhammad | 19 | 12
(Malaysia) Ooi Swee Khoon | 21 | 21

Final
1 | (Japan) Daichi Hanamoto | 13 | 21 | 20
(Malaysia) Ooi Swee Khoon | 21 | 15 | 22

=== Top half ===
==== Section 1 ====
First round
(Hong Kong) Leung | 21 | 21
(Finland) Raninen | 16 | 14

Second round
1 | (Japan) Hanamoto | 21 | 21
(Sweden) Lif | 7 | 12
(Germany) Teschner | 21 | 21
(Sri Lanka) Thilakawardana | 9 | 8
9/16 | (England) Le Tocq | 21 | 21
(Indonesia) Joseph | 18 | 7
(Thailand) Chuaynarong | 21 | 21
(Hong Kong) Leung | 6 | 10

Third round
1 | (Japan) Hanamoto | 21 | 21
(Germany) Teschner | 13 | 12
9/16 | (England) Le Tocq | 19 | 15
(Thailand) Chuaynarong | 21 | 21

Fourth round
1 | (Japan) Hanamoto | 21 | 21
(Thailand) Chuaynarong | 12 | 10

==== Section 2 ====
First round
(Mexico) Sañudo | 11 | 14
(Singapore) Chotteyandamada | 21 | 21

Second round
5/8 | (India) Behal | 21 | 21
(Spain) López | 8 | 13
(France) Séjournant | 21 | 12 | 13
(United Arab Emirates) Reyes | 12 | 21 | 21
9/16 | (Switzerland) Waldenberger | 21 | 21
(Malaysia) Teoh | 10 | 16
(Chinese Taipei) Li C-c | 12 | 16
(Singapore) Chotteyandamada | 21 | 21

Third round
5/8 | (India) Behal | 21 | 21
(United Arab Emirates) Reyes | 14 | 18
9/16 | (Switzerland) Waldenberger | 21 | 21
(Singapore) Chotteyandamada | 12 | 6

Fourth round
5/8 | (India) Behal | 21 | 15
9/16 | (Switzerland) Waldenberger | 23 | 21

==== Section 3 ====
First round
(United States) Mariappan | 17 | 17
(Malaysia) Lim | 21 | 21

Second round
3/4 | (Finland) Aro | 21 | 14 | 10
(Japan) Yamasaki | 15 | 21 | 21
(Thailand) Jenjitranont | 21 | 21
(United Arab Emirates) Abubacker | 6 | 10
9/16 | (France) Seignez | 16 | 22 | 21
(Switzerland) Khot | 21 | 20 | 11
(Hong Kong) Cheung | 18 | 12
(Malaysia) Lim | 21 | 21

Third round
(Japan) Yamasaki | 17 | 17
(Thailand) Jenjitranont | 21 | 21
9/16 | (France) Seignez | 13 | 22 | 11
(Malaysia) Lim | 21 | 20 | 21

Fourth round
(Thailand) Jenjitranont | 21 | 21
(Malaysia) Lim | 11 | 5

==== Section 4 ====
First round
(Chinese Taipei) Liao S-s | w | / | o
(Spain) Latorre
(England) Gayle | 21 | 21
(Sri Lanka) Yatapana | 8 | 15

Second round
5/8 | (Ukraine) Shkliaiev | 21 | 21
(Indonesia) Runkat | 5 | 17
(India) Kattapurath | 17 | 21 | 21
(Chinese Taipei) Liao S-s | 21 | 13 | 8
9/16 | (Germany) Histel | 20 | 21 | 21
(Australia) Dora | 22 | 14 | 14
(Poland) Gasz | 2 | 12
(England) Gayle | 21 | 21

Third round
5/8 | (Ukraine) Shkliaiev | 21 | 9 | 14
(India) Kattapurath | 15 | 21 | 21
9/16 | (Germany) Histel | 10 | 8
(England) Gayle | 21 | 21

Fourth round
(India) Kattapurath | 10 | 14
(England) Gayle | 21 | 21

=== Bottom half ===
==== Section 5 ====
First round
(Scotland) Singh | 13 | 17
(Ukraine) Isaenko | 21 | 21
(Thailand) Panapachara | 21 | 21
(Singapore) Wu | 13 | 19

Second round
(Ukraine) Isaenko | 21 | 15 | 21
(Switzerland) Bless | 17 | 21 | 18
(United Arab Emirates) Retnakaran | 7 | 13
9/16 | (Hong Kong) Ng | 21 | 21
(Thailand) Panapachara | 21 | 21
(Sweden) Nilebring | 15 | 5
(Malaysia) Law | 8 | 8
5/8 | (England) Aspinal | 21 | 21

Third round
(Ukraine) Isaenko | 18 | 14
9/16 | (Hong Kong) Ng | 21 | 10^{r}
(Thailand) Panapachara | 21 | 21
5/8 | (England) Aspinal | 11 | 18

Fourth round
(Ukraine) Isaenko | 21 | 21
(Thailand) Panapachara | 18 | 19

==== Section 6 ====
First round
(Sri Lanka) Mahindarathe | 19 | 5
(France) Bertolla | 21 | 21

Second round
(France) Bertolla | 21 | 21
(Spain) Hernansanz | 11 | 7
(Germany) Schlosser | 10 | 13
9/16 | (Japan) Higashi | 21 | 21
(Canada) Bhokanandh | 23 | 15
(Chinese Taipei) Tu K-s | 25 | 21
(India) Kale | 15 | 17
3/4 | (Indonesia) Muhammad | 21 | 21

Third round
(France) Bertolla | 15 | 20
9/16 | (Japan) Higashi | 21 | 22
(Chinese Taipei) Tu K-s | 10 | 10
3/4 | (Indonesia) Muhammad | 21 | 1

Fourth round
9/16 | (Japan) Higashi | 14 | 13
3/4 | (Indonesia) Muhammad | 21 | 21

==== Section 7 ====
First round
(Hong Kong) Mak | 21 | 21
(United Arab Emirates) Seth | 12 | 7

Second round
(Hong Kong) Mak | 16 | 14
(Japan) Ishihara | 21 | 21
(India) Baidya | 13 | 21 | 11
9/16 | (Denmark) Hermansen | 21 | 18 | 21
(Spain) Hernandez | 10 | 12
(New Zealand) Batty | 21 | 21
(Thailand) Narong | 16 | 9
5/8 | (Switzerland) Fröhlich | 21 | 21

Third round
(Japan) Ishihara | 19 | 21 | 15
9/16 | (Denmark) Hermansen | 21 | 16 | 21
(New Zealand) Batty | 16 | 12
5/8 | (Switzerland) Fröhlich | 21 | 21

Fourth round
9/16 | (Denmark) Hermansen | 21 | 11 | 9
5/8 | (Switzerland) Fröhlich | 16 | 21 | 8^{r}

==== Section 8 ====
First round
(Singapore) Loo | 10 | 10
(France) Gallet | 21 | 21

Second round
(France) Gallet | 9 | 22
(Malaysia) Ooi | 21 | 24
(Sweden) Ahlgren | 18 | 19
9/16 | (Germany) Prinz | 21 | 21
(Sri Lanka) Fernando | 21 | 17 | 14
(Finland) Saranen | 17 | 21 | 21
(England) Williams | 21 | 10 | 11
2 | (Chinese Taipei) Chao C-k | 18 | 21 | 21

Third round
(Malaysia) Ooi | 21 | 21
9/16 | (Germany) Prinz | 5 | 9
(Finland) Saranen | 17 | 8
2 | (Chinese Taipei) Chao C-k | 21 | 21

Fourth round
(Malaysia) Ooi | 21 | 21
2 | (Chinese Taipei) Chao C-k | 12 | 17

== Women's singles ==
=== Seeds ===
1. (Denmark) Gry Hermansen (second round)
2. (Thailand) Kamonwan Winyoowijak (second round)
3. (Japan) Sayaka Ueyama (quarter-finals)
4. (Thailand) Molthila Kitjanon (gold medalist)
5. (Sri Lanka) Nadeesha Gayanthi (third round)
6. (France) Audrey Petit (third round)
7. (Germany) Nicole Bartsch (quarter-finals)
8. (Hong Kong) Fung Ying (bronze medalist)

=== Finals ===
Semi-finals
5/8 | (Hong Kong) Fung Ying | 21 | 5 | 13
3/4 | (Thailand) Molthila Kitjanon | 17 | 21 | 21
(Denmark) Christina Aagaard | 9 | 21 | 15
(Chinese Taipei) Huang Chia-hsin | 21 | 18 | 21

Final
3/4 | (Thailand) Molthila Kitjanon | 21 | 21
(Chinese Taipei) Huang Chia-hsin | 11 | 14

=== Top half ===
==== Section 1 ====
First round
(England) Meijers | w | / | o
(India) Rode
(Poland) Kowalska | 21 | 7 | 17
(United Arab Emirates) Kuttikrishnan | 16 | 21 | 21

Second round
1 | (Denmark) Hermansen | 17 | 20
(Thailand) Faythet | 21 | 22
(Chinese Taipei) Chen Y-s | 10 | 7
(England) Meijers | 21 | 21
5/8 | (Hong Kong) Fung | 21 | 21
(Germany) Dewes | 14 | 12
(Mongolia) Davaasuren | 3 | 1
(United Arab Emirates) Kuttikrishnan | 21 | 21

Third round
(Thailand) Faythet | 21 | 21
(England) Meijers | 16 | 15
5/8 | (Hong Kong) Fung | 21 | 21
(United Arab Emirates) Kuttikrishnan | 6 | 8

Quarter-finals
(Thailand) Faythet | 21 | 16 | 14
5/8 | (Hong Kong) Fung | 15 | 21 | 21

==== Section 2 ====
First round
(Spain) Garcia | 21 | 21
(Poland) Pazyna | 18 | 14
(Sweden) Närfors | 13 | 21 | 20
(Japan) Kawashima | 21 | 16 | 22

Second round
3/4 | (Thailand) Kitjanon | 21 | 21
(Sri Lanka) Senanayaka | 2 | 0
(Singapore) Chew | 11 | 22
(Spain) Garcia | 21 | 24
5/8 | (France) Petit | 21 | 21
(India) Mukherjee | 16 | 14
(Germany) Marke | 15 | 13
(Japan) Kawashima | 21 | 21

Third round
3/4 | (Thailand) Kitjanon | 21 | 21
(Spain) Garcia | 10 | 10
5/8 | (France) Petit | 12 | 21 | 19
(Japan) Kawashima | 21 | 16 | 21

Quarter-finals
3/4 | (Thailand) Kitjanon | 21 | 21
(Japan) Kawashima | 8 | 8

=== Bottom half ===
==== Section 3 ====
First round
(Denmark) Aagaard | 19 | 21 | 21
(Poland) Cygan | 21 | 11 | 12
(Chinese Taipei) Hu Y-l | 17 | 12
(India) Melasheemi | 21 | 1
(Hong Kong) Kwok | 9 | 12
(France) Heude | 21 | 21

Second round
(Denmark) Aagaard | w | / | o
(England) Brewer
(India) Melasheemi | 14 | 21 | 16
5/8 | (Sri Lanka) Gayanthi | 21 | 19 | 21
(France) Heude | 21 | 21
(Thailand) Luangsuwan | 14 | 10
(Spain) Serrano | 9 | 11
3/4 | (Japan) Ueyama | 21 | 21

Third round
(Denmark) Aagaard | 21 | 21
5/8 | (Sri Lanka) Gayanthi | 6 | 12
(France) Heude | 22 | 14 | 19
3/4 | (Japan) Ueyama | 20 | 21 | 21

Quarter-finals
(Denmark) Aagaard | 21 | 21
3/4 | (Japan) Ueyama | 18 | 13

==== Section 4 ====
First round
(India) Gaba | 13 | 11
(United States) Saxena | 21 | 21
(Spain) Rueda | 5 | 6
(Canada) Reynolds | 21 | 21

Second round
(United States) Saxena | 14 | 20
(Switzerland) Monney | 21 | 22
(Romania) Popescu | 17 | 18
5/8 | (Germany) Bartsch | 21 | 21
(Canada) Reynolds | 22 | 21
(Norway) Formo | 20 | 3
(Chinese Taipei) Haung C-h | 21 | 0
2 | (Thailand) Winyoowijak | 19 | 0^{r}

Third round
(Switzerland) Monney | 21 | 14 | 16
5/8 | (Germany) Bartsch | 17 | 21 | 21
(Canada) Reynolds | 9 | 21 | 10
(Chinese Taipei) Haung C-h | 21 | 14 | 21

Quarter-finals
5/8 | (Germany) Bartsch | 11 | 7
(Chinese Taipei) Haung C-h | 21 | 21

== Men's doubles ==
=== Seeds ===
1. (Thailand) Boonsak Ponsana / Jakrapan Thanathiratham (silver medalist)
2. (United States) Tony Gunawan / (Indonesia) Hendra Setiawan (gold medalist)
3. (Switzerland) Jan Fröhlich / Kai Waldenberger (third round)
4. (Poland) Michał Łogosz / Przemysław Wacha (bronze medalist)
5. (Denmark) Lars Klintrup / Jacob Marcussen (first round)
6. (Japan) Mineo Higashi / Hiroshi Mine
7. (Romania) Robert Ciobotaru / Daniel Cojocaru (first round)
8. (India) Davinder Dhillon / Hemant Duggal (second round)

=== Finals ===
Semi-finals
1 | (Thailand) Boonsak Ponsana (Thailand) Jakrapan Thanathiratham | 21 | 21
(Chinese Taipei) Chang Chih-shin (Chinese Taipei) Wang Chih-kai | 8 | 11
3/4 | (Poland) Michał Łogosz^{‡} (Poland) Przemysław Wacha | 17 | 18
2 | (United States) Tony Gunawan (Indonesia) Hendra Setiawan | 21 | 21

Final
1 | (Thailand) Boonsak Ponsana (Thailand) Jakrapan Thanathiratham | 18 | 16
2 | (United States) Tony Gunawan (Indonesia) Hendra Setiawan | 21 | 21

=== Top half ===
==== Section 1 ====
First round
(United Arab Emirates) Hardias (United Arab Emirates) Seth | 21 | 21
(Malaysia) Loh^{‡} (Malaysia) Teoh | 14 | 13
(France) Prigent (France) Seignez | 19 | 18
(Germany) Teschner (Germany) Trautloff | 21 | 21
(Hong Kong) Lam (Hong Kong) Tam | 21 | 19 | 21
(Sri Lanka) Jayamanne^{‡} (Sri Lanka) Yatapana | 19 | 21 | 11
5/8 | (Romania) Ciobotaru (Romania) Cojocaru^{‡} | 21 | 10 | 9
(Sweden) Ahlgren (Finland) von Hertzen | 14 | 21 | 21
(Japan) Fujino (Japan) Sakai | 16 | 22 | 18
(Chinese Taipei) Wu E-j (Chinese Taipei) Yu K-c | 21 | 20 | 21
(Singapore) Chotteyandamada (Singapore) Loh | 21 | 12 | 12
(India) Gupta (India) Naithani | 19 | 21 | 21
(Spain) Hermansanz (Spain) López | 8 | 5
(England) Gayle (England) Law | 21 | 21

Second round
1 | (Thailand) Ponsana (Thailand) Thanathiratham | 21 | 21
(United Arab Emirates) Hardias (United Arab Emirates) Seth | 18 | 13
(Germany) Teschner (Germany) Trautloff | 16 | 11
(Hong Kong) Lam (Hong Kong) Tam | 21 | 21
(Sweden) Ahlgren (Finland) von Hertzen | 11 | 20
(Chinese Taipei) Wu E-j (Chinese Taipei) Yu K-c | 21 | 22
(India) Gupta (India) Naithani | 21 | 19 | 23
(England) Gayle (England) Law | 14 | 21 | 21

Third round
1 | (Thailand) Ponsana (Thailand) Thanathiratham | 21 | 21
(Hong Kong) Lam (Hong Kong) Tam | 14 | 15
(Chinese Taipei) Wu E-j (Chinese Taipei) Yu K-c | 22 | 14 | 13
(India) Gupta (India) Naithani | 20 | 21 | 21

Quarter-finals
1 | (Thailand) Ponsana (Thailand) Thanathiratham | 21 | 21
(India) Gupta (India) Naithani | 18 | 17

==== Section 2 ====
First round
3/4 | (Switzerland) Fröhlich (Switzerland) Waldenberger | 19 | 22 | 21
(France) Gallet (France) Martin | 21 | 20 | 16
(Finland) Aro (Finland) Saranen | 12 | 21
(United Arab Emirates) Abubacker (United Arab Emirates) Pookunju | 21 | 23
(Sweden) Lif (Sweden) Nilebring | 12 | 11
(Hong Kong) Cheung (Hong Kong) Fung | 21 | 21
(Thailand) Punyangam (Thailand) Wiriyaphadungphong | 14 | 11
(Japan) Morinaga (Japan) Watanabe | 21 | 21
5/8 | (India) Dhillon^{‡} (India) Duggal | 21 | 21
(Austria) Bauer^{‡} (France) Séjournant | 19 | 15
(Sri Lanka) Withana^{‡} (Indonesia) Rahmat^{‡} | 21 | 21
(Scotland) Singh (Scotland) Smith^{‡} | 10 | 17
(Chinese Taipei) Chang C-s (Chinese Taipei) Wang C-k | 21 | 21
(Ukraine) Isaenko (Ukraine) Shkliaiev | 11 | 12
(Germany) Schlosser (Germany) Tatar^{‡} | 16 | 13
(Malaysia) Foo^{‡} (Malaysia) Abdullah | 21 | 21

Second round
3/4 | (Switzerland) Fröhlich (Switzerland) Waldenberger | 21 | 21
(United Arab Emirates) Abubacker (United Arab Emirates) Pookunju | 4 | 18
(Hong Kong) Cheung (Hong Kong) Fung | 14 | 14
(Japan) Morinaga (Japan) Watanabe | 21 | 21
5/8 | (India) Dhillon^{‡} (India) Duggal | 15 | 12
(Sri Lanka) Withana^{‡} (Indonesia) Rahmat^{‡} | 21 | 21
(Chinese Taipei) Chang C-s (Chinese Taipei) Wang C-k | 21 | 21
(Malaysia) Foo^{‡} (Malaysia) Abdullah | 14 | 11

Third round
3/4 | (Switzerland) Fröhlich (Switzerland) Waldenberger
(Japan) Morinaga (Japan) Watanabe | w | / | o
(Sri Lanka) Withana^{‡} (Indonesia) Rahmat^{‡} | 8 | 11
(Chinese Taipei) Chang C-s (Chinese Taipei) Wang C-k | 21 | 21

Quarter-finals
(Japan) Morinaga (Japan) Watanabe | 18 | 21 | 14
(Chinese Taipei) Chang C-s (Chinese Taipei) Wang C-k | 21 | 19 | 21

=== Bottom half ===
==== Section 3 ====
First round
(Sri Lanka) de Silva^{‡} (Sri Lanka) Jayalath^{‡} | 8 | 24 | 21
(United Arab Emirates) Ali (United Arab Emirates) Arafath^{‡} | 21 | 22 | 19
(Malaysia) Khor (Malaysia) Yeo | 17 | 13
(England) Aspinal (England) Williams | 21 | 21
(France) Bertolla (France) de la Giroday | 21 | 21
(Mexico) López^{‡} (Mexico) Sañudo | 8 | 8
(Thailand) Kantarapisan (Thailand) Pocharoen | 11 | 21 | 18
5/8 | (Japan) Higashi (Japan) Mine | 21 | 15 | 21
(Chinese Taipei) Lan C-h (Chinese Taipei) Wei W-m | 19 | 15
(Singapore) Wu (Singapore) Yap | 21 | 21
(India) James (India) Navaneethakrishnan | 17 | 15
(England) Le Tocq (Denmark) Svejstrup^{‡} | 21 | 21
(Indonesia) Runkat (Indonesia) Sie^{‡} | 13 | 16
(Germany) Dietrich (Germany) Histel | 21 | 21
(Hong Kong) Mak (Hong Kong) Ng | 14 | 18
3/4 | (Poland) Łogosz^{‡} (Poland) Wacha | 21 | 21

Second round
(Sri Lanka) de Silva^{‡} (Sri Lanka) Jayalath^{‡} | 12 | 12
(England) Aspinal (England) Williams | 21 | 21
(France) Bertolla (France) de la Giroday | 21 | 18 | 10
5/8 | (Japan) Higashi (Japan) Mine | 16 | 21 | 21
(Singapore) Wu (Singapore) Yap | 13 | 6
(England) Le Tocq (Denmark) Svejstrup^{‡} | 21 | 21
(Germany) Dietrich (Germany) Histel | 10 | 12
3/4 | (Poland) Łogosz^{‡} (Poland) Wacha | 21 | 21

Third round
(England) Aspinal (England) Williams | 21 | 9 | 12
5/8 | (Japan) Higashi (Japan) Mine | 12 | 21 | 21
(England) Le Tocq (Denmark) Svejstrup^{‡} | 10 | 12
3/4 | (Poland) Łogosz^{‡} (Poland) Wacha | 21 | 21

Quarter-finals
5/8 | (Japan) Higashi (Japan) Mine | 13 | 13
3/4 | (Poland) Łogosz^{‡} (Poland) Wacha | 21 | 21

==== Section 4 ====
First round
(Chinese Taipei) Li C-c (Chinese Taipei) Yeh C-n^{‡} | 11 | 25
(Denmark) Hermansen (Poland) Kosz^{‡} | 21 | 27
(India) Behal (India) Thapa | 21 | 29 | 21
(Hong Kong) Lui (Hong Kong) Yan | 17 | 30 | 19
(United Arab Emirates) Manadi (United Arab Emirates) Reyes | 12 | 14
(Thailand) Bumrungpun (Thailand) Lapho | 21 | 21
(Japan) Hanamoto (Japan) Yamasaki | 21 | 22 | 21
5/8 | (Denmark) Klintrup^{‡} (Denmark) Marcussen | 23 | 20 | 18
(Spain) Hernández (Spain) Latorre | 13 | 11
(United States) Mariappan (United States) Mishra | 21 | 21
(Finland) Raninen (Finland) Valli | 21 | 21
(New Zealand) Batty (New Zealand) Wong | 17 | 14
(Germany) Disić (Germany) Prinz | 15 | 21 | 21
(Singapore) Loo (Singapore) Ng | 21 | 18 | 9
(Thailand) Nilyok (Thailand) Saisirivit | 17 | 13
2 | (United States) Gunawan (Indonesia) Setiawan | 21 | 21

Second round
(Denmark) Hermansen (Poland) Kosz^{‡} | 10 | 11
(India) Behal (India) Thapa | 21 | 21
(Thailand) Bumrungpun (Thailand) Lapho | 21 | 14 | 15
(Japan) Hanamoto (Japan) Yamasaki | 18 | 21 | 21
(United States) Mariappan (United States) Mishra | 10 | 19
(Finland) Raninen (Finland) Valli | 21 | 21
(Germany) Disić (Germany) Prinz | 7 | 10
2 | (United States) Gunawan (Indonesia) Setiawan | 21 | 21

Third round
(India) Behal (India) Thapa | 15 | 21 | 21
(Japan) Hanamoto (Japan) Yamasaki | 21 | 18 | 15
(Finland) Raninen (Finland) Valli | 10 | 5
2 | (United States) Gunawan (Indonesia) Setiawan | 21 | 21

Quarter-finals
(India) Behal (India) Thapa | 5 | 15
2 | (United States) Gunawan (Indonesia) Setiawan | 21 | 21

== Women's doubles ==
=== Seeds ===
1. (Iceland) Drífa Harðardóttir / (Denmark) Gry Hermansen (gold medalist)
2. (France) Hélène Dijoux / Audrey Petit (third round)
3. (India) Sangeetha Mari / Sandhya Melasheemi (second round)
4. (Hong Kong) Vera Choy / Fung Ying (third round)
5. (Romania) Florentina Constantinescu / Irina Popescu (silver medalist)
6. (Japan) Ayako Kawashima / Sayaka Nunome (third round)
7. (England) Suzanne Brewer / Alison Meijers (second round)
8. (Poland) Dominika Guzik-Płuchowska / (France) Céline Heude (quarter-finals)

=== Finals ===
Semi-finals
1 | (Iceland) Drífa Harðardóttir^{‡} (Denmark) Gry Hermansen | 21 | 21
(Canada) Jody Patrick^{‡} (Canada) Lindsay Reynolds | 11 | 12
5/8 | (Romania) Florentina Constantinescu (Romania) Irina Popescu | 21 | 21
(Chinese Taipei) Teng Tao-chun (Chinese Taipei) Tsai Hui-min | 11 | 15

Final
1 | (Iceland) Drífa Harðardóttir^{‡} (Denmark) Gry Hermansen | 21 | 22
5/8 | (Romania) Florentina Constantinescu (Romania) Irina Popescu | 15 | 20

=== Top half ===
==== Section 1 ====
First round

Second round
1 | (Iceland) Harðardóttir^{‡} (Denmark) Hermansen | 21 | 21
(Ukraine) Igronova (Austria) Tiron | 14 | 12
(Singapore) Chew (Singapore) Tan | w | / | o
(Malaysia) See (Malaysia) Yan
5/8 | (Poland) Guzik-Płuchowska^{‡} (France) Heude | 21 | 9 | 21
(Chinese Taipei) Huang C-h (Chinese Taipei) Liu S-c | 19 | 21 | 18
(India) Arora (India) Rode
(Thailand) Khampachue (Thailand) Thongdejsri | w | / | o

Third round
1 | (Iceland) Harðardóttir^{‡} (Denmark) Hermansen | 21 | 21
(Singapore) Chew (Singapore) Tan | 6 | 8
5/8 | (Poland) Guzik-Płuchowska^{‡} (France) Heude | 21 | 21
(Thailand) Khampachue (Thailand) Thongdejsri | 9 | 9

Quarter-finals
1 | (Iceland) Harðardóttir^{‡} (Denmark) Hermansen | 21 | 21
5/8 | (Poland) Guzik-Płuchowska^{‡} (France) Heude | 9 | 11

==== Section 2 ====
First round

Second round
3/4 | (India) Mari (India) Melasheemi | 16 | 21 | 20
(Canada) Patrick^{‡} (Canada) Reynolds | 21 | 17 | 22
(Thailand) Jaruhirunskul (Thailand) Kongukos | 22 | 17
(Germany) Kaack (Germany) Taskin | 24 | 21
5/8 | (Japan) Kawashima (Japan) Nunome | 21 | 21
(Spain) Rueda (Spain) Serrano | 16 | 4
(Hong Kong) Li^{‡} (Hong Kong) Wong | 21 | 21
(Poland) Kornacka (Poland) Zakrzewska | 12 | 7

Third round
(Canada) Patrick^{‡} (Canada) Reynolds | 24 | 21
(Germany) Kaack (Germany) Taskin | 22 | 14
5/8 | (Japan) Kawashima (Japan) Nunome | 5 | 20
(Hong Kong) Li^{‡} (Hong Kong) Wong | 21 | 22

Quarter-finals
(Canada) Patrick^{‡} (Canada) Reynolds | 19 | 21 | 21
(Hong Kong) Li^{‡} (Hong Kong) Wong | 21 | 13 | 8

=== Bottom half ===
==== Section 3 ====
First round
(Poland) Kowalska (England) Light | 5 | 14
(Malaysia) Clarissa (Malaysia) Rowena | 21 | 21

Second round
(Malaysia) Clarissa (Malaysia) Rowena | w | / | o
(Thailand) Chattanupakorn (Thailand) Winyoowijak
(Switzerland) Monney (Sri Lanka) Gayanthi | 14 | 18
5/8 | (Romania) Constantinescu (Romania) Popescu | 21 | 21
(Indonesia) Herzog (Indonesia) Jauhari | 21 | 21
(Sri Lanka) Abeyrathne^{‡} (Sri Lanka) Rathnayake | 10 | 5
(India) Bhawatkar (India) Dhoke | 4 | 15
3/4 | (Hong Kong) Choy (Hong Kong) Fung | 21 | 21

Third round
(Malaysia) Clarissa (Malaysia) Rowena | 8 | 9
5/8 | (Romania) Constantinescu (Romania) Popescu | 21 | 21
(Indonesia) Herzog (Indonesia) Jauhari | 22 | 16 | 21
3/4 | (Hong Kong) Choy (Hong Kong) Fung | 20 | 21 | 12

Quarter-finals
5/8 | (Romania) Constantinescu (Romania) Popescu | 21 | 21
(Indonesia) Herzog (Indonesia) Jauhari | 10 | 15

==== Section 4 ====
First round

Second round
(Germany) Marke (Sweden) Närfors | 21 | 21
(Poland) Pazyna (Poland) Wilk^{‡} | 8 | 16
(Hong Kong) Kwok (Hong Kong) Yu | 18 | 21 | 21
5/8 | (England) Brewer (England) Meijers | 21 | 19 | 19
(Chinese Taipei) Teng T-c (Chinese Taipei) Tsai H-m | 21 | 21
(India) Lalduhzuali (India) Ponty | 11 | 17
(Thailand) Luangsuwan (Thailand) Worawong | 5 | 12
2 | (France) Dijoux (France) Petit | 21 | 21

Third round
(Germany) Marke (Sweden) Närfors | 21 | 22
(Hong Kong) Kwok (Hong Kong) Yu | 12 | 20
(Chinese Taipei) Teng T-c (Chinese Taipei) Tsai H-m | 21 | 23
2 | (France) Dijoux (France) Petit | 18 | 21

Quarter-finals
(Germany) Marke (Sweden) Närfors | 12 | 14
(Chinese Taipei) Teng T-c (Chinese Taipei) Tsai H-m | 21 | 21

== Mixed doubles ==
=== Seeds ===
1. (Thailand) Jakrapan Thanathiratham / Saisamol Chattanupakorn (quarter-finals)
2. (Thailand) Ittikorn Punyangam / Kamonwan Winyoowijak (third round)
3. (Romania) Robert Ciobotaru / Florentina Constantinescu (second round)
4. (Denmark) Søren Hermansen / Gry Hermansen (second round)
5. (Hong Kong) Cheung Chung Fai / Chan Pui Chi (quarter-finals)
6. (India) Shetty Abhinand / Sangeetha Mari (bronze medalist)
7. (Germany) Pascal Histel / Tinna Kähler (third round)
8. (Finland) Jesper von Hertzen / Emmi Heikkinen (bronze medalist)

=== Finals ===
Semi-finals
(Indonesia) Muhammad Muhammad (Canada) Jody Patrick^{‡} | 21 | 21
5/8 | (Finland) Jesper von Hertzen (Finland) Emmi Heikkinen^{‡} | 12 | 10
(Indonesia) Unang Rahmat^{‡} (Sri Lanka) Nadeesha Gayanthi | 20 | 21 | 21
5/8 | (India) Shetty Abhinand (India) Sangeetha Mari | 22 | 10 | 13

Final
(Indonesia) Muhammad Muhammad (Canada) Jody Patrick^{‡} | 21 | 21
(Indonesia) Unang Rahmat^{‡} (Sri Lanka) Nadeesha Gayanthi | 18 | 11

=== Top half ===
==== Section 1 ====
First round
(Hong Kong) Fung (Hong Kong) Choy | 21 | 23
(Japan) Ishikawa^{‡} (Japan) Kasai^{‡} | 5 | 21
(Chinese Taipei) Liu S-h (Chinese Taipei) Cheng Y-c | 13 | 11
(United States) Umrani^{‡} (United States) Saxena | 21 | 21
(England) Aspinal (England) Brewer | 21 | 21
(Spain) López (Spain) Rueda | 14 | 12
(France) Gallet (France) Peregrina^{‡} | 19 | 19
(India) Behal (India) Ingalhalikar | 21 | 21
(Ukraine) Shkliaiev (Poland) Nielsen^{‡} | 17 | 8
(Indonesia) Muhammad (Canada) Patrick^{‡} | 21 | 21
(Romania) Cojocaru^{‡} (Romania) Popescu | 19 | 21 | 21
(United Arab Emirates) Reyes (United Arab Emirates) Mathew^{‡} | 21 | 13 | 10

Second round
1 | (Thailand) Thanathiratham (Thailand) Chattanupakorn | 21 | 21
(Hong Kong) Fung (Hong Kong) Choy | 13 | 9
(United States) Umrani^{‡} (United States) Saxena | 21 | 16 | 21
(England) Aspinal (England) Brewer | 14 | 21 | 11
5/8 | (Germany) Histel (Germany) Kähler^{‡} | 21 | 20 | 21
(India) Behal (India) Ingalhalikar | 11 | 22 | 19
(Indonesia) Muhammad (Canada) Patrick^{‡} | 21 | 21
(Romania) Cojocaru^{‡} (Romania) Popescu | 11 | 14

Third round
1 | (Thailand) Thanathiratham (Thailand) Chattanupakorn | 21 | 21
(United States) Umrani^{‡} (United States) Saxena | 10 | 14
5/8 | (Germany) Histel (Germany) Kähler^{‡} | 20 | 11
(Indonesia) Muhammad (Canada) Patrick^{‡} | 22 | 21

Quarter-finals
1 | (Thailand) Thanathiratham (Thailand) Chattanupakorn | 21 | 18 | 17
(Indonesia) Muhammad (Canada) Patrick^{‡} | 17 | 21 | 21

==== Section 2 ====
First round
(Indonesia) Djaja (Indonesia) Jauhari | 17 | 12
(Denmark) Lund^{‡} (Norway) Formo | 21 | 21
(Japan) Ueno (Japan) Nunome | 25 | 19 | 21
(France) de la Giroday (France) Heude | 23 | 21 | 15
(Poland) Gasz (Poland) Guzik-Płuchowska^{‡} | 21 | 21
(Germany) Trautloff (Germany) Kaack | 12 | 11
5/8 | (Finland) von Hertzen (Finland) Heikkinen^{‡} | 21 | 21
(Spain) Hernández (Spain) Serrano | 8 | 12
(Thailand) Bumrungpun (Thailand) Ponsana | 11 | 21 | 16
(Chinese Taipei) Chen H-c (Chinese Taipei) Tsao T-c^{‡} | 21 | 14 | 21
(India) Gupta (India) Gaba | 22 | 21
(Singapore) Wu (Singapore) Chew | 20 | 12
(England) Le Tocq (Denmark) Pedersen^{‡} | 14 | 21 | 15
(Hong Kong) Ng (Hong Kong) Fung | 21 | 11 | 21

Second round
3/4 | (Denmark) S. Hermansen (Denmark) G. Hermansen | 21 | 21 | 13
(Denmark) Lund^{‡} (Norway) Formo | 19 | 23 | 21
(Japan) Ueno (Japan) Nunome | 21 | 17 | 21
(Poland) Gasz (Poland) Guzik-Płuchowska^{‡} | 17 | 21 | 11
5/8 | (Finland) von Hertzen (Finland) Heikkinen^{‡} | 21 | 28
(Chinese Taipei) Chen H-c (Chinese Taipei) Tsao T-c^{‡} | 15 | 26
(India) Gupta (India) Gaba | 14 | 19
(Hong Kong) Ng (Hong Kong) Fung | 21 | 21

Third round
(Denmark) Lund^{‡} (Norway) Formo | 21 | 21
(Japan) Ueno (Japan) Nunome | 13 | 10
5/8 | (Finland) von Hertzen (Finland) Heikkinen^{‡} | w | / | o
(Hong Kong) Ng (Hong Kong) Fung

Quarter-finals
(Denmark) Lund^{‡} (Norway) Formo | 17 | 18
5/8 | (Finland) von Hertzen (Finland) Heikkinen^{‡} | 21 | 21

=== Bottom half ===
==== Section 3 ====
First round
(Poland) Krawiec^{‡} (Poland) Zakrzewska | 16 | 15
(Japan) Mine (Japan) Ueyama | 21 | 21
(India) Naithani (India) Arora | 21 | 21
(Spain) Morcillo (Spain) Garcia | 19 | 9
(France) Séjournant (France) Dijoux | 19 | 21 | 21
(Indonesia) Runkat (Indonesia) Herzog | 21 | 9 | 15
(Chinese Taipei) Ho C-h^{‡} (Chinese Taipei) Lu M-c^{‡} | 21 | 11 | 19
5/8 | (Hong Kong) Cheung (Hong Kong) Chan | 16 | 21 | 21
(England) Place^{‡} (England) Meijers | 19 | 19
(Thailand) B. Tangkeerati (Thailand) K. Tangkeerati | 21 | 21
(Germany) Prinz (Germany) Taskin | 10 | 21 | 21
(Sweden) Ahlgren (Sweden) Närfors | 21 | 19 | 16
(Indonesia) Rahmat^{‡} (Sri Lanka) Gayanthi | 21 | 21
(Malaysia) Moo (Malaysia) Yan | 16 | 18

Second round
(Japan) Mine (Japan) Ueyama | 18 | 16
(India) Naithani (India) Arora | 21 | 21
(France) Séjournant (France) Dijoux | 10 | 18
5/8 | (Hong Kong) Cheung (Hong Kong) Chan | 21 | 21
(Thailand) B. Tangkeerati (Thailand) K. Tangkeerati | 21 | 21
(Germany) Prinz (Germany) Taskin | 15 | 13
(Indonesia) Rahmat^{‡} (Sri Lanka) Gayanthi | 21 | 21
3/4 | (Romania) Ciobotaru (Romania) Constantinescu | 17 | 19

Third round
(India) Naithani (India) Arora | 21 | 17 | 22
5/8 | (Hong Kong) Cheung (Hong Kong) Chan | 19 | 21 | 24
(Thailand) B. Tangkeerati (Thailand) K. Tangkeerati | 18 | 14
(Indonesia) Rahmat^{‡} (Sri Lanka) Gayanthi | 21 | 1

Quarter-finals
5/8 | (Hong Kong) Cheung (Hong Kong) Chan | 9 | 7
(Indonesia) Rahmat^{‡} (Sri Lanka) Gayanthi | 21 | 21

==== Section 4 ====
First round
(Germany) Disić (Germany) Marke | 9 | 11
(Switzerland) Bless (Switzerland) Monney | 21 | 21
(Thailand) Saisirivit (Thailand) Samitsomboon | 21 | 21
(Poland) Suski^{‡} (Poland) Cygan | 14 | 10
(Chinese Taipei) Yu K-c (Chinese Taipei) Lu Y-c | 13 | 13
(Japan) Sakai (Japan) Kawashima | 21 | 21
(United Arab Emirates) Seth (United Arab Emirates) Kuttikrishnan | 12 | 21 | 18
5/8 | (India) Abhinand (India) Mari | 21 | 19 | 21
(Hong Kong) Chan^{‡} (Hong Kong) Wong | 21 | 21
(Austria) Bauer^{‡} (Austria) Tiron | 6 | 13
(Spain) Latorre (Spain) Puebla | 6 | 15
(England) Williams (England) Kondratieva^{‡} | 21 | 21
(Singapore) Loo (Singapore) Chiang^{‡} | 21 | 21
(Sri Lanka) Fernando (Sri Lanka) Senanayaka | 14 | 15

Second round
(Switzerland) Bless (Switzerland) Monney | 15 | 21 | 21
(Thailand) Saisirivit (Thailand) Samitsomboon | 21 | 12 | 12
(Japan) Sakai (Japan) Kawashima | 16 | 14
5/8 | (India) Abhinand (India) Mari | 21 | 21
(Hong Kong) Chan^{‡} (Hong Kong) Wong | 21 | 21
(England) Williams (England) Kondratieva^{‡} | 10 | 15
(Singapore) Loo (Singapore) Chiang^{‡}
2 | (Thailand) Punyangam (Thailand) Winyoowijak | w | / | o

Third round
(Switzerland) Bless (Switzerland) Monney | 20 | 21 | 18
5/8 | (India) Abhinand (India) Mari | 22 | 14 | 21
(Hong Kong) Chan^{‡} (Hong Kong) Wong | w | / | o
2 | (Thailand) Punyangam (Thailand) Winyoowijak

Quarter-finals
5/8 | (India) Abhinand (India) Mari | 21 | 21
(Hong Kong) Chan^{‡} (Hong Kong) Wong | 10 | 17
