= Polish National Badminton Championships =

The Polish National Badminton Championships is a tournament organized to crown the best badminton players in Poland. The tournament started in 1964.

== Past winners ==
Year	Men's singles	Women's singles	Men's doubles	Women's doubles	Mixed doubles
1964	Feliks Glapka, Poznań	Teresa Masłowska, Warsaw	Feliks Glapka; Marian Grys, Poznań	no competition	Bolesław Suterski; Stanisława Suterska, Poznań
1965	Aleksander Koczur, Kraków	Teresa Masłowska, Warsaw	Andrzej Domagała; Krzysztof Englander, Wrocław	no competition	Bolesław Suterski; Stanisława Suterska, Poznań
1966	Wiesław Świątczak, Łódź	Teresa Masłowska, Warsaw	Andrzej Domagała; Krzysztof Englander, Wrocław	no competition	Wiesław Świątczak; Irena Józefowicz, Łódź
1967	Wiesław Świątczak, Łódź	Barbara Rojewska, Olsztyn	Andrzej Domagała; Krzysztof Englander, Wrocław	no competition	Krzysztof Englander; Bożena Basińska, Wrocław
1968	Krzysztof Englander, Wrocław	Irena Karolczak, Wrocław	Jerzy Przybylski; Lech Woźny, Poznań	no competition	Krzysztof Englander; Irena Karolczak, Wrocław
1969	Andrzej Domagała, Wrocław	Teresa Masłowska, Warsaw	Andrzej Domagała; Krzysztof Englander, Wrocław	no competition	Bogusław Żołądkowski; Teresa Masłowska, Warsaw
1970	Wiesław Świątczak, Łódź	Irena Karolczak, Wrocław	Jerzy Przybylski; Lech Woźny, Poznań	no competition	Jan Makarus; Jolanta Proch, Szczecin
1971	Wiesław Świątczak, Łódź	Lidia Baczyńska, Wrocław	Andrzej Domagała; Krzysztof Englander, Wrocław	no competition	Wiesław Świątczak; Ewa Astasiewicz, Łódź
1972	Wiesław Danielski	Irena Karolczak	Wiesław Danielski; Zygmunt Skrzypczyński	Lidia Baczyńska; Irena Karolczak	Leszek Nowakowski; Hana Snochowska
1973	Andrzej Domagała	Irena Karolczak	Wiesław Danielski; Zygmunt Skrzypczyński	no competition	Sławomir Wloszczynski; Irena Karolczak
1974	Stanisław Rosko	Irena Karolczak	Ryszard Borek; Stanisław Rosko	Irena Karolczak; Hana Snochowska	Leszek Nowakowski; Hana Snochowska
1975	Zygmunt Skrzypczyński	Irena Karolczak	Andrzej Domagała; Wiesław Świątczak	Irena Karolczak; Hana Snochowska	Leslaw Markowicz; Irena Karolczak
1976	Zygmunt Skrzypczyński	Elżbieta Utecht	Krzysztof Englander; Janusz Labisko	Irena Karolczak; Wanda Czamańska	Leslaw Markowicz; Irena Karolczak
1978	Zygmunt Skrzypczyński	Elżbieta Utecht	Zygmunt Skrzypczyński; Sławomir Włoszczyński	Bożena Wojtkowska; Elżbieta Utecht	Janusz Labisko; Anna Zyśk
1979	Brunon Rduch	Elżbieta Utecht	Zygmunt Skrzypczyński; Sławomir Włoszczyński	Bożena Wojtkowska; Maria Bahryj	Zygmunt Skrzypczyński; Elżbieta Utecht
1980	Zygmunt Skrzypczyński	Bożena Wojtkowska	Zygmunt Skrzypczyński; Janusz Labisko	Bożena Wojtkowska; Ewa Rusznica	Zygmunt Skrzypczyński; Elżbieta Utecht
1981	Brunon Rduch	Bożena Wojtkowska	Brunon Rduch; Norbert Węgrzyn	Bożena Wojtkowska; Zofia Żółtańska	Jerzy Dołhan; Ewa Rusznica
1982	Stanisław Rosko	Bożena Wojtkowska	Stanisław Rosko; Kazimierz Ciurys	Bożena Wojtkowska; Ewa Rusznica	Jerzy Dołhan; Bożena Wojtkowska
1983	Stanisław Rosko	Ewa Rusznica	Jerzy Dołhan; Grzegorz Olchowik	Bożena Wojtkowska; Bożena Siemieniec	Kazimierz Ciurys; Bożena Wojtkowska
1984	Stanisław Rosko	Bożena Wojtkowska	Jerzy Dołhan; Grzegorz Olchowik	Bożena Wojtkowska; Ewa Wilman	Kazimierz Ciurys; Bożena Wojtkowska
1985	Grzegorz Olchowik	Bożena Wojtkowska	Jerzy Dołhan; Grzegorz Olchowik	Bożena Siemieniec; Zofia Żółtańska	Jerzy Dołhan; Ewa Wilman
1986	Grzegorz Olchowik	Bożena Siemieniec	Jerzy Dołhan; Grzegorz Olchowik	Bożena Siemieniec; Zofia Żółtańska	Jerzy Dołhan; Ewa Wilman
1987	Jerzy Dołhan	Bożena Haracz	Jerzy Dołhan; Grzegorz Olchowik	Bożena Haracz; Bożena Siemieniec	Jerzy Dołhan; Bożena Haracz
1988	Jerzy Dołhan	Bożena Siemieniec	Jerzy Dołhan; Grzegorz Olchowik	Bożena Haracz; Bożena Siemieniec	Jerzy Dołhan; Bożena Haracz
1989	Jacek Hankiewicz	Bożena Siemieniec	Jerzy Dołhan; Jacek Hankiewicz	Bożena Haracz; Bożena Siemieniec	Jerzy Dołhan; Bożena Haracz
1990	Jacek Hankiewicz	Beata Syta	Jerzy Dołhan; Jacek Hankiewicz	Bożena Haracz; Beata Syta	Jerzy Dołhan; Bożena Haracz
1991	Jacek Hankiewicz	Katarzyna Krasowska	Jerzy Dołhan; Jacek Hankiewicz	Bożena Haracz; Bożena Siemieniec	Jerzy Dołhan; Bożena Haracz
1992	Dariusz Zięba	Katarzyna Krasowska	Jerzy Dołhan; Jacek Hankiewicz	Bożena Haracz; Bożena Bąk	Jerzy Dołhan; Bożena Haracz
1993	Jacek Hankiewicz	Katarzyna Krasowska	Dariusz Zięba; Jacek Hankiewicz	Bożena Haracz; Bożena Bąk	Jerzy Dołhan; Bożena Haracz
1994	Dariusz Zięba	Katarzyna Krasowska	Jerzy Dołhan; Damian Pławecki	Monika Lipińska; Sylwia Rutkiewicz	Damian Pławecki; Dorota Borek
1995	Dariusz Zięba	Katarzyna Krasowska	Jerzy Dołhan; Damian Pławecki	Dorota Borek; Katarzyna Krasowska	Jerzy Dołhan; Bożena Haracz
1996	Dariusz Zięba	Katarzyna Krasowska	Dariusz Zięba; Jacek Hankiewicz	Monika Bienkowska; Katarzyna Boczek	Robert Mateusiak; Sylwia Rutkiewicz
1997	Jacek Niedźwiedzki	Katarzyna Krasowska	Jerzy Dołhan; Damian Pławecki	Dorota Borek; Katarzyna Krasowska	Damian Pławecki; Dorota Borek
1998	Jacek Niedźwiedzki	Katarzyna Krasowska	Michał Łogosz; Damian Pławecki	Bożena Haracz; Katarzyna Krasowska	Damian Pławecki; Dorota Grzejdak
1999	Przemysław Wacha	Kamila Augustyn	Michał Łogosz; Robert Mateusiak	Bożena Haracz; Joanna Szleszyńska	Robert Mateusiak; Monika Bienkowska
2000	Jacek Niedźwiedzki	Katarzyna Krasowska	Michał Łogosz; Robert Mateusiak	Bożena Haracz; Katarzyna Krasowska	Robert Mateusiak; Barbara Kulanty
2001	Jacek Niedźwiedzki	Kamila Augustyn	Michał Łogosz; Robert Mateusiak	Barbara Kulanty; Joanna Szleszyńska	Robert Mateusiak; Barbara Kulanty
2002	Przemysław Wacha	Kamila Augustyn	Michał Łogosz; Robert Mateusiak	Kamila Augustyn; Joanna Szleszyńska	Robert Mateusiak; Barbara Kulanty
2003	Jacek Niedźwiedzki	Kamila Augustyn	Michał Łogosz; Robert Mateusiak	Kamila Augustyn; Paulina Matusewicz	Robert Mateusiak; Barbara Kulanty
2004	Przemysław Wacha	Kamila Augustyn	Michał Łogosz; Robert Mateusiak	Kamila Augustyn; Nadieżda Kostiuczyk	Robert Mateusiak; Barbara Kulanty
2005	Przemysław Wacha	Kamila Augustyn	Michał Łogosz; Robert Mateusiak	Kamila Augustyn; Nadieżda Kostiuczyk	Robert Mateusiak; Barbara Kulanty
2006	Przemysław Wacha	Angelika Węgrzyn	Rafał Hawel; Przemysław Wacha	Kamila Augustyn; Nadieżda Kostiuczyk	Robert Mateusiak; Nadieżda Kostiuczyk
2007	Przemysław Wacha	Kamila Augustyn	Michał Łogosz; Robert Mateusiak	Kamila Augustyn; Nadieżda Kostiuczyk	Robert Mateusiak; Nadieżda Kostiuczyk
2008	Przemysław Wacha	Kamila Augustyn	Michał Łogosz; Robert Mateusiak	Kamila Augustyn; Nadieżda Kostiuczyk	Robert Mateusiak; Nadieżda Kostiuczyk
2009	Przemysław Wacha	Kamila Augustyn	Michał Łogosz; Robert Mateusiak	Małgorzata Kurdelska; Agnieszka Wojtkowska	Robert Mateusiak; Kamila Augustyn
2010	Przemysław Wacha	Kamila Augustyn	Michał Łogosz; Robert Mateusiak	Kamila Augustyn; Nadieżda Kostiuczyk	Robert Mateusiak; Nadieżda Kostiuczyk
2011	Przemysław Wacha	Kamila Augustyn	Michał Łogosz; Adam Cwalina	Małgorzata Kurdelska; Nadieżda Zięba	Rafał Hawel; Kamila Augustyn
2012	Przemysław Wacha	Kamila Augustyn	Robert Mateusiak; Adam Cwalina	Natalia Pocztowiak; Agnieszka Wojtkowska	Wojciech Szkudlarczyk; Agnieszka Wojtkowska
2013	Przemysław Wacha	Kamila Augustyn	Michał Łogosz; Adam Cwalina	Aneta Wojtkowska; Agnieszka Wojtkowska	Wojciech Szkudlarczyk; Agnieszka Wojtkowska
2014	Przemysław Wacha	Anna Narel	Łukasz Moreń; Wojciech Szkudlarczyk	Aneta Wojtkowska; Agnieszka Wojtkowska	Robert Mateusiak; Agnieszka Wojtkowska
2015	Mateusz Dubowski	Kamila Augustyn	Adam Cwalina; Przemysław Wacha	Aneta Wojtkowska; Agnieszka Wojtkowska	Paweł Pietryja; Aneta Wojtkowska
2016	Adrian Dziółko	Weronika Grudzina	Adam Cwalina; Przemysław Wacha	Aneta Wojtkowska; Agnieszka Wojtkowska	Robert Mateusiak; Nadieżda Zięba
2017	Mateusz Dubowski	Wiktoria Dąbczyńska	Adam Cwalina; Robert Mateusiak	Aneta Wojtkowska; Agnieszka Wojtkowska	Robert Mateusiak; Nadieżda Zięba
2018	Michał Rogalski	Kamila Augustyn	Adam Cwalina; Miłosz Bochat	Aneta Wojtkowska; Agnieszka Wojtkowska	Michał Łogosz; Kamila Augustyn
2019	Adrian Dziółko	Kamila Augustyn	Adam Cwalina; Miłosz Bochat	Aneta Wojtkowska; Agnieszka Wojtkowska	Paweł Pietryja; Agnieszka Wojtkowska
2020	Adrian Dziółko	Wiktoria Dąbczyńska	Przemysław Wacha; Michał Łogosz	Wiktoria Dąbczyńska; Aleksandra Pająk	Paweł Śmiłowski; Magdalena Świerczyńska
2021	Michał Rogalski	Zuzanna Jankowska	Przemysław Wacha; Michał Łogosz	Wiktoria Adamek; Kornelia Marczak	Paweł Śmiłowski; Wiktoria Adamek
2022	Krzysztof Jakowczuk	Zuzanna Jankowska	Miłosz Bochat; Wiktor Trecki	Dominika Kwaśnik; Kornelia Marczak	Miłosz Bochat; Magdalena Świerczyńska
2023	Dominik Kwinta	Joanna Podedworny	Miłosz Bochat; Robert Cybulski	Dominika Kwaśnik; Kornelia Marczak	Paweł Śmiłowski; Agnieszka Wojtkowska
2024	Mateusz Golas	Joanna Rudna	Miłosz Bochat; Paweł Śmiłowski	Paulina Hankiewicz; Kornelia Marczak	Paweł Śmiłowski; Magdalena Świerczyńska
2025	Dominik Kwinta	Ulyana Volskaya	Robert Cybulski; Przemysław Szydłowski	Anastasiya Khomich; Daria Zimnol	Szymon Ślepecki; Anastasiya Khomich
