= Jesper von Hertzen =

Finnish badminton player (born 1980)

Personal information
- Born: 30 June 1980 (age 46)

Sport
- Country: Finland
- Sport: Badminton
- Highest ranking: 666 (MS 17 May 2012); 101 (MD 15 October 2009; 246 (XD 15 October 2009)
- BWF profile
Medal record
Men's badminton
Representing Finland
World Senior Championships
Bronze medal – third place	2025 Pattaya	Mixed doubles 40+

Jesper von Hertzen (born 30 June 1980) is a Finnish badminton player. He was the runners-up of Estonian International tournament in the men's doubles event in 2007 and 2015.

== Achievements ==
=== World Senior Championships ===
Mixed doubles

Year	Age	Venue	Partner	Opponent	Score	Result	Ref
2025	40+	Eastern National Sports Training Centre, Pattaya, Thailand	(Finland) Emmi Heikkinen	(Indonesia) Muhammad Muhammad (Canada) Jody Patrick	12–21, 10–21	Bronze	

=== BWF International Challenge/Series ===
Men's doubles

Year	Tournament	Partner	Opponent	Score	Result
2007	Estonian International	(Finland) Iwo Zakowski	(Finland) Tuomas Nuorteva (Finland) Mikko Vikman	16–21, 13–21	(silver) Runner-up
2015	Estonian International	(Finland) Mika Köngäs	(France) Laurent Constantin (France) Matthieu Lo Ying Ping	14–21, 19–21	(silver) Runner-up

Commonwealth Youth Games tournament
BWF International Series tournament
BWF Future Series tournament
