= Huang Chia-hsin =

Taiwanese badminton player (born 1984)

Huang Chia-hsin 黃嘉欣
Personal information
- Born: 7 July 1984 (age 42) Taipei, Taiwan
- Height: 1.64 m (5 ft 5 in)

Sport
- Country: Taiwan
- Sport: Badminton
Medal record
Women's badminton
Representing Chinese Taipei
World Senior Championships
| Silver medal – second place | 2025 Pattaya | Women's singles 40+ |
Asian Junior Championships
| Silver medal – second place | 2001 Taipei | Girls' team |
| Bronze medal – third place | 1999 Yangon | Girls' team |

Huang Chia-hsin (born 7 July 1984) is a badminton player and coach from Taiwan.

== Career ==
She developed her badminton skills while attending Taipei Municipal Shezi Elementary School, Taipei Municipal Chengyuan High School, Datong High School, George Vocational High School of Taipei, and Taipei Municipal Song Shan Senior High School. Huang was among the first group of students in Song Shan Senior High School's new badminton club. A 2002 Min Sheng Bao article said, "Huang Chia-hsin is 164 cm tall, which is considered petite, but her footwork is good, and her personality is cheerful." She competed at the 2005 World Badminton Championships in Anaheim and reached the second round, losing to first seed Zhang Ning from China. Her older sister Huang Chia-chi is also a badminton player and taught her the sport. Huang was the bronze medalist at the 1999 Asian Junior Championships in the girls' team event.

A 2005 article in Min Sheng Bao about the MMOA Cup National tournament said, "The disadvantage of Huang Chia-hsin's playing is that she lacks confidence in herself." She thought she had insufficient practice despite having practiced with the national team so was unsure about "defend[ing] her title". The article noted, "In the final, Huang Chia-hsin cut the ball sharply, successfully mobilized Jian Yujin, and defended well."

== Achievements ==
=== World Senior Championships ===
Women's singles

| Year | Age | Venue | Opponent | Score | Result | Ref |
|---|---|---|---|---|---|---|
| 2025 | 35+ | Eastern National Sports Training Centre, Pattaya, Thailand | (Thailand) Molthila Kitjanon | 11–21, 14–21 | Silver | |
