= Denny Setiawan =

Indonesian badminton player (born 1980)

Personal information
- Born: 9 September 1980 (age 46) Surabaya, East Java, Indonesia

Sport
- Country: Indonesia
- Sport: Badminton
- Handedness: Right
- Event: Men's & mixed doubles

Men's & mixed doubles
- BWF profile
Medal record
Men's badminton
Representing Indonesia
Asian Junior Championships
Silver medal – second place	1997 Manila	Boys' team
Bronze medal – third place	1997 Manila	Mixed doubles
Bronze medal – third place	1998 Kuala Lumpur	Boys' team
Bronze medal – third place	1998 Kuala Lumpur	Boys' doubles
Bronze medal – third place	1998 Kuala Lumpur	Mixed doubles

Denny Setiawan (born 9 September 1980) is an Indonesian badminton player who later represented Singapore. Setiawan joined the PB Djarum club in 2006, and now works as a badminton coach. Setiawan was part of the Indonesia junior team that competed at the 1997 and 1998 Asian Junior Championships, winning a silver and four bronze medals. He had won some international senior tournament in Asian Satellite and also in Oceania, and the 2003 Waikato International tournament impressed him, by defeating the top seeds Keita Masuda and Tadashi Ohtsuka, of Japan.

== Achievements ==
=== Asian Junior Championships ===
Boys' doubles
Year	Venue	Partner	Opponent	Score	Result
1998	Kuala Lumpur Badminton Stadium, Kuala Lumpur, Malaysia	(Indonesia) Donny Prasetyo	(China) Guo Siwei (China) Jiang Shan	9–15, 8–15	Bronze

Mixed doubles
Year	Venue	Partner	Opponent	Score	Result
1997	Ninoy Aquino Stadium, Manila, Philippines	(Indonesia) Rossi Riani	(Malaysia) Chan Chong Ming (Malaysia) Lim Pek Siah	11–15, 2–15	Bronze
1998	Kuala Lumpur Badminton Stadium, Kuala Lumpur, Malaysia	(Indonesia) Puspa Devi	(China) Jiang Shan (China) Huang Sui	1–15, 2–15	Bronze

=== IBF International (6 titles, 2 runners-up) ===
Men's doubles
Year	Tournament	Partner	Opponent	Score	Result
2002	Vietnam Satellite	(Indonesia) Hendri Kurniawan Saputra	(Thailand) Sudket Prapakamol (Thailand) Jakrapan Thanathiratham	15–4, 15–11	(gold) Winner
2002	Singapore Satellite	(Indonesia) Donny Prasetyo	(Indonesia) Joko Riyadi (Indonesia) Hendra Setiawan	15–5, 15–7	(gold) Winner
2002	Smiling Fish Satellite	(Indonesia) Hendri Kurniawan Saputra	(Malaysia) Koo Kien Keat (Malaysia) Ong Soon Hock	7–2, 7–5, 7–5	(gold) Winner
2003	Smiling Fish Satellite	(Indonesia) Hendri Kurniawan Saputra	(Thailand) Patapol Ngernsrisuk (Thailand) Sudket Prapakamol	10–15, 10–15	(silver) Runner-up
2003	Waikato International	(Singapore) Hendri Kurniawan Saputra	(Japan) Keita Masuda (Japan) Tadashi Ohtsuka	15–7, 12–15, 15–3	(gold) Winner
2003	Western Australia International	(Singapore) Hendri Kurniawan Saputra	(Hong Kong) Yohan Hadikusumo Wiratama (Hong Kong) Yau Tsz Yuk	15–8, 15–9	(gold) Winner
2003	Singapore Satellite	(Singapore) Hendri Kurniawan Saputra	(Singapore) Faris Mawardi (Singapore) Nunung Wibiyanto	15–3, 15–3	(gold) Winner

Mixed doubles
Year	Tournament	Partner	Opponent	Score	Result
2004	Mauritius International	(Singapore) Frances Liu	(Singapore) Kendrick Lee (Singapore) Li Yujia	6–15, 5–15	(silver) Runner-up
