= Przemysław Wacha =

Polish badminton player

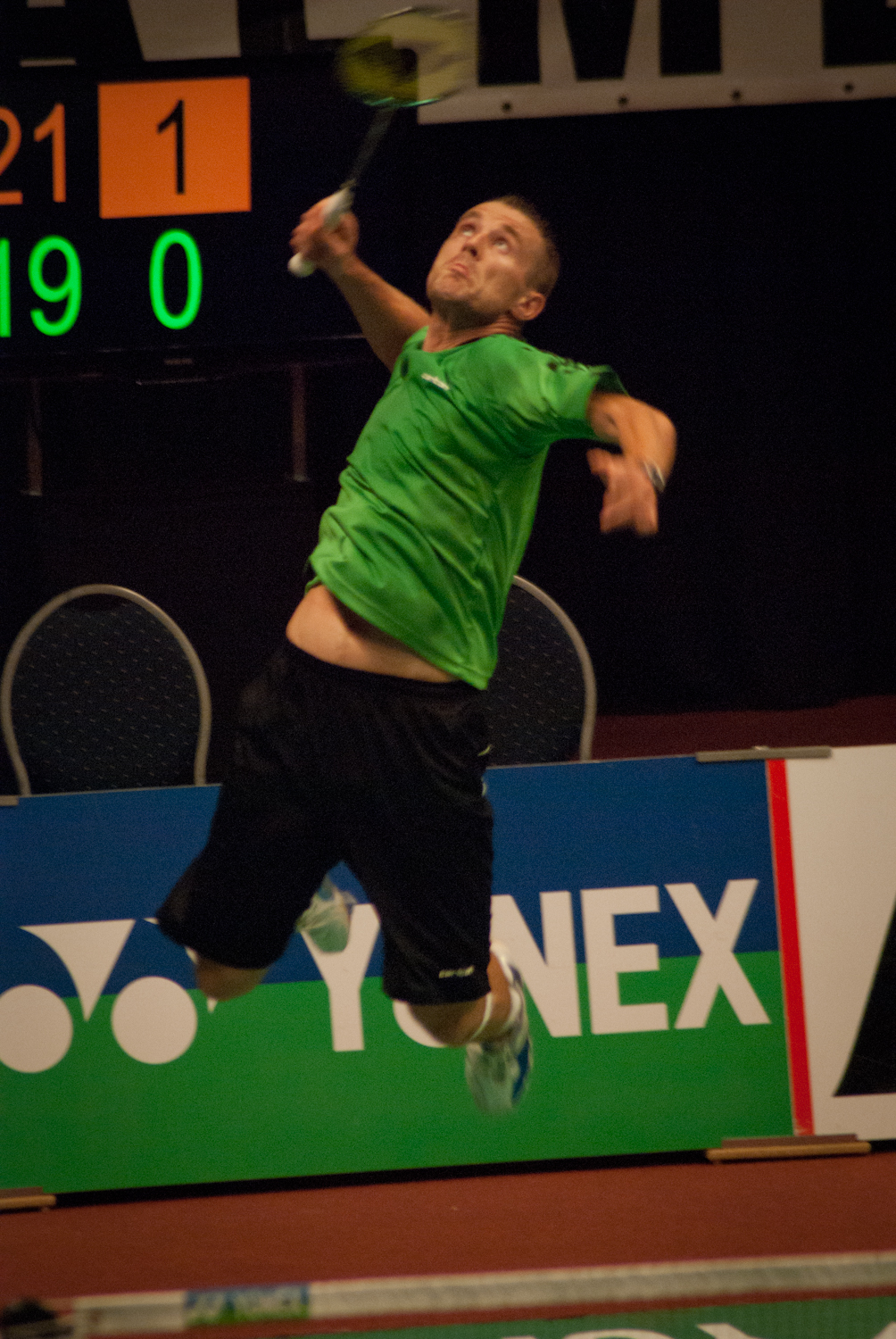

Personal information
- Born: 31 January 1981 (age 45) Głubczyce, Poland
- Height: 1.81 m (5 ft 11 in)
- Weight: 80 kg (176 lb)

Sport
- Country: Poland
- Sport: Badminton
- Handedness: Right

Men's singles & doubles
- Highest ranking: 14 (MS 19 July 2007); 19 (MD 26 February 2015)
- BWF profile
Medal record
Badminton
Representing Poland
World Senior Championships
Bronze medal – third place	2025 Pattaya	Men's doubles 40+
European Championships
Bronze medal – third place	2008 Herning	Men's singles
European Mixed Team Championships
Bronze medal – third place	2008 Herning	Mixed team
European Men's Team Championships
Silver medal – second place	2010 Warsaw	Men's team
European Junior Championships
Silver medal – second place	1999 Glasgow	Boys' doubles
Bronze medal – third place	1999 Glasgow	Boys' singles

Przemysław Wacha (Polish pronunciation: [pʂɛˈmɨswaf ˈvaxa]; born 31 January 1981) is a Polish badminton player.

== Career ==
Wacha played badminton at the 2004 Summer Olympics in men's singles, losing in the first round to Wong Choong Hann of Malaysia. He won the bronze medal at the 2008 European Badminton Championships. Wacha also played badminton at the 2008 Summer Olympics in men's singles, losing in the round of 16 to Bao Chunlai of China. At the 2012 Summer Olympics, he didn't qualify from the pool stages. From 2004 to 2010 Wacha won seven consecutive titles at the Polish National Badminton Championships. At the 2016 Rio Olympics Wacha played men's doubles with compatriot Adam Cwalina, but they didn't advance from the group stage.

== Achievements ==
=== World Senior Championships ===
Men's doubles
Year	Age	Venue	Partner	Opponent	Score	Result	Ref.
2025	40+	Eastern National Sports Training Centre; Pattaya, Thailand	(Poland) Michał Łogosz	(United States) Tony Gunawan (Indonesia) Hendra Setiawan	17–21, 18–21	Bronze	

=== European Championships ===
Men's singles
Year	Venue	Opponent	Score	Result
2008	Messecenter; Herning, Denmark	(Denmark) Joachim Persson	21–17, 9–21, 10–21	Bronze

=== European Junior Championships ===
Boys' singles
Year	Venue	Opponent	Score	Result
1999	Kelvin Hall; Glasgow, Scotland	(Germany) Björn Joppien	3–15, 16–17	Bronze

Boys' doubles
Year	Venue	Partner	Opponent	Score	Result
1999	Kelvin Hall; Glasgow, Scotland	(Poland) Piotr Żołądek	(Denmark) Mathias Boe (Denmark) Kasper Kiim Jensen	3–15, 8–15	Silver

=== BWF Grand Prix ===
The BWF Grand Prix had two levels, the Grand Prix and Grand Prix Gold. It was a series of badminton tournaments sanctioned by the Badminton World Federation (BWF) and played between 2007 and 2017.

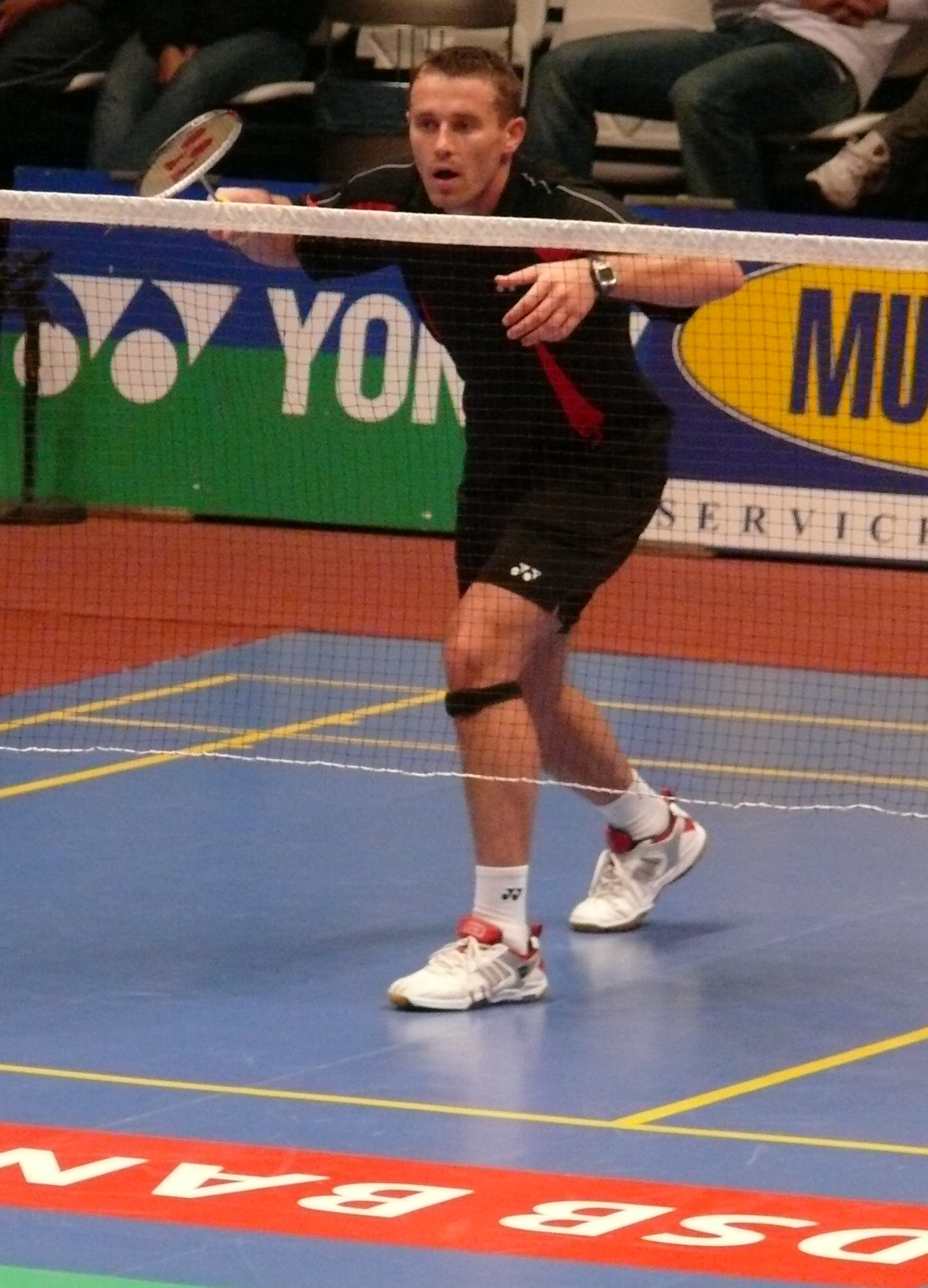
Przemysław Wacha at 2007 Dutch Open

Men's singles
Year	Tournament	Opponent	Score	Result
2007	Dutch Open	(Singapore) Kendrick Lee	22–20, 11–21, 18–21	(silver) Runner-up

Men's doubles
Year	Tournament	Partner	Opponent	Score	Result
2014	U.S. Grand Prix	(Poland) Adam Cwalina	(Japan) Taiki Shimada (Japan) Yoshinori Takeuchi	21–13, 21–6	(gold) Winner

BWF Grand Prix Gold tournament
BWF Grand Prix tournament

=== BWF International Challenge/Series ===
Men's singles
Year	Tournament	Opponent	Score	Result
2000	Slovak International	(Poland) Jacek Niedźwiedzki	15–11, 14–17, 15–10	(gold) Winner
2000	Hungarian International	(Spain) Arturo Ruiz	15–11, 15–11	(gold) Winner
2002	Polish International	(England) Aamir Ghaffar	7–5, 8–7, 7–2	(gold) Winner
2002	Croatian International	(Japan) Zhiyuan Liu	7–2, 7–3, 7–3	(gold) Winner
2002	Czech International	(England) Mark Burgess	9–15, 15–12, 15–7	(gold) Winner
2003	Austrian International	(England) Aamir Ghaffar	15–10, 15–13	(gold) Winner
2004	Austrian International	(Chinese Taipei) Chien Yu-hsiu	15–13, 11–15, 15–8	(gold) Winner
2005	Slovak International	(Finland) Ville Lång	12–15, 15–9, 15–9	(gold) Winner
2005	Polish International	(India) Arvind Bhat	15–8, 15–7	(gold) Winner
2005	Czech International	(Denmark) Martin Bille Larsen	13–15, 15–1, 15–4	(gold) Winner
2005	Scottish International	(Denmark) Kasper Ødum	9–15, 15–8, 15–2	(gold) Winner
2006	Polish International	(India) Chetan Anand	21–18, 21–12	(gold) Winner
2007	Le Volant d'Or de Toulouse	(Czech Republic) Petr Koukal	21–13, 21–17	(gold) Winner
2010	White Nights	(Russia) Ivan Sozonov	20–22, 14–21	(silver) Runner-up
2010	Kharkiv International	(Russia) Ivan Sozonov	14–21, 20–22	(silver) Runner-up
2010	Bulgarian International	(Lithuania) Kęstutis Navickas	21–14, 11–21, 21–13	(gold) Winner
2010	Italian International	(Spain) Pablo Abián	21–13, 21–16	(gold) Winner
2010	Turkey International	(Netherlands) Eric Pang	21–18, 21–17	(gold) Winner
2011	Brazil International	(Belgium) Yuhan Tan	21–14, 21–19	(gold) Winner
2011	Czech International	(Czech Republic) Petr Koukal	21–19, 21–16	(gold) Winner
2011	Bulgarian International	(Malaysia) Tan Chun Seang	21–11, 11–21, 21–11	(gold) Winner
2011	Irish International	(England) Rajiv Ouseph	15–21, 5–11 retired	(silver) Runner-up
2012	Austrian International	(Belgium) Yuhan Tan	14–21, 21–15, 21–16	(gold) Winner
2012	White Nights	(Ukraine) Dmytro Zavadsky	21–16, 15–21, 18–21	(silver) Runner-up

Men's doubles
Year	Tournament	Partner	Opponent	Score	Result
2000	Slovak International	(Poland) Piotr Żołądek	(Sweden) Per-Henrik Croona (Sweden) Marcus Janssen	15–12, 15–6	(gold) Winner
2012	Swiss International	(Poland) Adam Cwalina	(England) Chris Coles (England) Matthew Nottingham	23–21, 21–14	(gold) Winner
2013	Polish Open	(Poland) Adam Cwalina	(Japan) Yuya Komatsuzaki (Japan) Hiroki Takeuchi	21–19, 22–24, 21–17	(gold) Winner
2013	French International	(Poland) Adam Cwalina	(France) Baptiste Carême (France) Gaëtan Mittelheisser	21–18, 21–16	(gold) Winner
2013	Spanish Open	(Poland) Adam Cwalina	(Poland) Michał Łogosz (Poland) Łukasz Moreń	21–10, 18–21, 21–19	(gold) Winner
2013	Kharkiv International	(Poland) Adam Cwalina	(Denmark) Kim Astrup (Denmark) Anders Skaarup Rasmussen	22–20, 15–21, 21–12	(gold) Winner
2013	Czech International	(Poland) Adam Cwalina	(Chinese Taipei) Chen Chung-jen (Chinese Taipei) Wang Chi-lin	20–22, 22–20, 21–12	(gold) Winner
2013	Bulgarian International	(Poland) Adam Cwalina	(Poland) Łukasz Moreń (Poland) Wojciech Szkudlarczyk	16–21, 21–13, 22–24	(silver) Runner-up
2013	Irish Open	(Poland) Adam Cwalina	(Netherlands) Jacco Arends (Netherlands) Jelle Maas	21–9, 21–6	(gold) Winner
2013	Italian International	(Poland) Adam Cwalina	(Poland) Łukasz Moreń (Poland) Wojciech Szkudlarczyk	23–21, 21–17	(gold) Winner
2014	Swedish Masters	(Poland) Adam Cwalina	(Poland) Łukasz Moreń (Poland) Wojciech Szkudlarczyk	21–18, 20–22, 21–15	(gold) Winner
2014	Polish Open	(Poland) Adam Cwalina	(Russia) Nikita Khakimov (Russia) Vasily Kuznetsov	21–10, 21–11	(gold) Winner
2014	Orléans International	(Poland) Adam Cwalina	(France) Bastian Kersaudy (France) Gaëtan Mittelheisser	13–21, 21–17, 21–18	(gold) Winner
2014	Spanish Open	(Poland) Adam Cwalina	(Poland) Łukasz Moreń (Poland) Wojciech Szkudlarczyk	21–9, 15–21, 16–21	(silver) Runner-up
2014	Polish International	(Poland) Adam Cwalina	(Germany) Daniel Benz (Germany) Jones Ralfy Jansen	11–8, 6–11, 11–5, 8–11, 11–9	(gold) Winner
2014	Czech International	(Poland) Adam Cwalina	(Poland) Łukasz Moreń (Poland) Wojciech Szkudlarczyk	21–15, 21–15	(gold) Winner
2014	Irish Open	(Poland) Adam Cwalina	(Germany) Max Schwenger (Germany) Josche Zurwonne	12–21, 21–10, 21–18	(gold) Winner
2015	Swedish Masters	(Poland) Adam Cwalina	(Denmark) Kim Astrup (Denmark) Anders Skaarup Rasmussen	15–21, 11–21	(silver) Runner-up
2015	Polish Open	(Poland) Adam Cwalina	(Japan) Kenta Kazuno (Japan) Kazushi Yamada	19–21, 12–21	(silver) Runner-up
2015	Orléans International	(Poland) Adam Cwalina	(England) Matthew Nottingham (England) Harley Towler	12–21, 18–21	(silver) Runner-up
2015	Peru International	(Poland) Adam Cwalina	(France) Lucas Claerbout (France) Lucas Corvée	21–18, 21–11	(gold) Winner
2015	Spanish International	(Poland) Adam Cwalina	(Denmark) Kasper Antonsen (Denmark) Oliver Babic	21–17, 21–14	(gold) Winner
2015	Lagos International	(Poland) Adam Cwalina	(India) Manu Attri (India) B. Sumeeth Reddy	17–21, 17–21	(silver) Runner-up
2015	Kharkiv International	(Poland) Adam Cwalina	(Thailand) Bodin Isara (Thailand) Nipitphon Phuangphuapet	18–21, 13–21	(silver) Runner-up
2015	Belgian International	(Poland) Adam Cwalina	(India) Manu Attri (India) B. Sumeeth Reddy	20–22, 21–19, 20–22	(silver) Runner-up
2015	Czech Open	(Poland) Adam Cwalina	(India) Manu Attri (India) B. Sumeeth Reddy	19–21, 22–20, 21–14	(gold) Winner
2015	Welsh International	(Poland) Adam Cwalina	(England) Marcus Ellis (England) Chris Langridge	16–21, 21–16, 16–21	(silver) Runner-up
2015	Irish Open	(Poland) Adam Cwalina	(Germany) Raphael Beck (Germany) Peter Käsbauer	16–21, 18–21	(silver) Runner-up
2015	Mersin Turkey International	(Poland) Adam Cwalina	(Denmark) Kasper Antonsen (Denmark) Niclas Nøhr	16–21, 15–21	(silver) Runner-up
2016	Brazil International	(Poland) Adam Cwalina	(India) Alwin Francis (India) Tarun Kona	21–15, 21–16	(gold) Winner
2016	Finnish Open	(Poland) Adam Cwalina	(Denmark) Mathias Christiansen (Denmark) David Daugaard	23–21, 12–21, 12–21	(silver) Runner-up
2016	Peru International	(Poland) Adam Cwalina	(India) Manu Attri (India) B. Sumeeth Reddy	21–19, 18–21, 30–28	(gold) Winner
2016	Tahiti International	(Poland) Adam Cwalina	(United States) Phillip Chew (United States) Sattawat Pongnairat	9–5 retired	(gold) Winner

BWF International Challenge tournament
BWF International Series tournament
