= Jakrapan Thanathiratham =

Thai badminton player (born 1982)

Personal information
- Born: 22 February 1982 (age 44) Chiang Mai Province, Thailand
- Height: 1.74 m (5 ft 9 in)

Sport
- Country: Thailand
- Sport: Badminton
- Handedness: Right
- Event: Men's singles & doubles

Men's singles & doubles
- BWF profile
Medal record
Men's badminton
Representing Thailand
Southeast Asian Games
Bronze medal – third place	2005 Manila	Men's team
Bronze medal – third place	2001 Kuala Lumpur	Men's team
World Senior Championships
Silver medal – second place	2025 Pattaya	Men's doubles 40+
Asian Junior Championships
Bronze medal – third place	2000 Kyoto	Boys' singles

Jakrapan Thanathiratham (Thai: จักรพันธ์ ธนธีรธรรม; born 22 February 1982) is a former Thai badminton player from Chiang Mai Province. Thanathiratham was the boys' singles bronze medalist at the 2000 Asian Junior Championships in Kyoto, Japan. He trained at the RBAC badminton club.

== Achievements ==
=== World Senior Championships ===
Men's doubles

Year	Age	Venue	Partner	Opponent	Score	Result	Ref
2025	40+	Eastern National Sports Training Centre, Pattaya, Thailand	(Thailand) Boonsak Ponsana	(United States) Tony Gunawan (Indonesia) Hendra Setiawan	18–21, 16–21	Silver	

=== Asian Junior Championships ===
Boys' singles
Year	Venue	Opponent	Score	Result
2000	Nishiyama Park Gymnasium; Kyoto, Japan	(Indonesia) Sony Dwi Kuncoro	15–10, 2–15, 16–17	Bronze

=== IBF International ===
Men's singles
Year	Tournament	Opponent	Score	Result
2002	India Satellite	(India) Abhinn Shyam Gupta	4–15, 15–6, 4–15	(silver) Runner-up
2002	Vietnam Satellite	(Vietnam) Nguyễn Tiến Minh	15–5, 14–17, 15–7	(gold) Winner
2000	Smiling Fish Satellite	(Thailand) Anupap Thiraratsakul	11–15, 4–15	(silver) Runner-up

Men's doubles
Year	Tournament	Partner	Opponent	Score	Result
2002	Vietnam Satellite	(Thailand) Sudket Prapakamol	(Indonesia) Hendri Kurniawan Saputra (Indonesia) Denny Setiawan	4–15, 11–15	(silver) Runner-up
