= Nadeesha Gayanthi =

Sri Lankan badminton player

Personal information
- Full name: Nadeesha Gayanthi Murukkuwadura
- Born: 6 September 1984 (age 42) Balapitiya, Sri Lanka
- Height: 1.60 m (5 ft 3 in)
- Weight: 54 kg (119 lb)

Sport
- Country: Sri Lanka
- Sport: Badminton
- Event: Women's singles & doubles

Women's singles & doubles
- BWF profile
Medal record
Women's badminton
Representing Sri Lanka
World Senior Championships
| Silver medal – second place | 2025 Pattaya | Mixed doubles 40+ |
South Asian Games
| Silver medal – second place | 2004 Islamabad | Women's team |
| Silver medal – second place | 2006 Colombo | Women's team |
| Silver medal – second place | 2010 Dhaka | Women's team |
| Silver medal – second place | 2016 Guwahati-Shillong | Women's team |
| Bronze medal – third place | 2006 Colombo | Women's doubles |
| Bronze medal – third place | 2010 Dhaka | Women's doubles |

Nadeesha Gayanthi Murukkuwadura (born 6 September 1984) is a Sri Lankan badminton player. She was included in the national badminton team in 2006 and got the opportunity to represent Sri Lanka at the 2006 Asian Games competing in the women's singles and women's doubles events.

Nadeesha Gayanthi also participated at the 2007 BWF World Championships representing Sri Lanka and competed in the women's doubles category pairing with Thilini Jayasinghe despite being knocked out of the first round. In 2008, she partnered Chandrika de Silva and emerged victorious in the women's doubles as a part of the Sri Lankan National Badminton Championships. Nadeesha Gayanthi also appeared for Sri Lanka at the 2014 Commonwealth Games by competing in the singles and doubles events.

== Achievements ==
=== World Senior Championships ===
Mixed doubles

| Year | Age | Venue | Partner | Opponent | Score | Result | Ref |
|---|---|---|---|---|---|---|---|
| 2025 | 40+ | Eastern National Sports Training Centre, Pattaya, Thailand | (Indonesia) Unang Rahmat | (Indonesia) Muhammad Muhammad (Sri Lanka) Jody Patrick | 18–21, 11–21 | Silver | |

=== South Asian Games ===
Women's doubles
| Year | Venue | Partner | Opponent | Score | Result |
|---|---|---|---|---|---|
| 2006 | Sugathadasa Indoor Stadium; Colombo, Sri Lanka | (Sri Lanka) Rasangi Ranatunge | (India) Jwala Gutta (India) Shruti Kurien | 10–21, 10–21 | Bronze |
| 2010 | Wooden-Floor Gymnasium; Dhaka, Bangladesh | (Sri Lanka) Chandrika de Silva | (India) P. C. Thulasi (India) Ashwini Ponnappa | 8–21, 13–21 | Bronze |
