= 2025 BWF World Senior Championships =

Tournament details
- Dates: 7 – 14 September
- Edition: 12th
- Level: International
- Competitors: 1,628 from 53 nations
- Venue: Eastern National Sports Training Centre
- Location: Pattaya, Thailand
- Official website: Official website

The 2025 BWF World Senior Championships was an badminton tournament held from 7 to 14 September 2025 at Eastern National Sports Training Centre in Pattaya, Thailand. It was awarded to Auckland, New Zealand but they have withdrawn. A new bidding process was initiated by BWF in June 2024. This was the first time that Thailand held the world senior championships.

== Tournament ==
The 2025 BWF World Senior Championships was the twelfth edition of the BWF World Senior Championships, which had been held biannually since 2003. This tournament was organized by the Badminton Association of Thailand with sanction from the BWF.

=== Venue ===
This international tournament will be held at Eastern National Sports Training Centre in Pattaya, Thailand.

== Competition schedule ==
Competition schedule was announced at 31 August 2025:

Key
#R	#th round	GS	Group stage	QF	Quarter-finals	SF	Semi-finals	F	Final

Age	Event	Sep 7 9:00		Sep 8 9:00	Sep 9 9:00	Sep 10 9:00	Sep 11 9:00	Sep 12 10:00	Sep 13 10:00	Sep 14 10:00
35+	MS	1R			2R	3R	4R	QF	SF	F
35+	WS			1R		2R	3R	QF	SF	F
35+	MD			1R		2R	3R	QF	SF	F
35+	WD			1R		2R	3R	QF	SF	F
35+	XD	1R			2R		3R	QF	SF	F
40+	MS	1R			2R	3R	4R	QF	SF	F
40+	WS			1R		2R	3R	QF	SF	F
40+	MD	1R			2R		3R	QF	SF	F
40+	WD			1R		2R	3R	QF	SF	F
40+	XD	1R			2R		3R	QF	SF	F
45+	MS	1R			2R	3R	4R	QF	SF	F
45+	WS			1R		2R	3R	QF	SF	F
45+	MD	1R		2R		3R	4R	QF	SF	F
45+	WD			1R			2R	QF	SF	F
45+	XD	1R			2R		3R	QF	SF	F
50+	MS	1R		2R		3R	4R	QF	SF	F
50+	WS			1R	2R		3R	QF	SF	F
50+	MD			1R	2R		3R	QF	SF	F
50+	WD			1R		1R	3R	QF	SF	F
50+	XD	1R			2R		3R	QF	SF	F
55+	MS	1R			2R	3R	4R	QF	SF	F
55+	WS			1R		2R	3R	QF	SF	F
55+	MD			1R		2R	3R	QF	SF	F
55+	WD			1R			2R	QF	SF	F
55+	XD	1R			2R		3R	QF	SF	F
60+	MS	1R	2R	2R	3R		4R	QF	SF	F
60+	WS			1R		2R	3R	QF	SF	F
60+	MD			1R		2R	3R	QF	SF	F
60+	WD			1R			2R	QF	SF	F
60+	XD	1R			2R		3R	QF	SF	F
65+	MS	1R			2R		3R	QF	SF	F
65+	WS			1R			2R	QF	SF	F
65+	MD			1R		2R	3R	QF	SF	F
65+	WD	GS			GS		GS	QF	SF	F
65+	XD			1R			2R	QF	SF	F
70+	MS			1R		2R	3R	QF	SF	F
70+	WS	GS			GS	GS		QF	SF	F
70+	MD			1R			2R	QF	SF	F
70+	WD			GS		GS		GS	SF	F
70+	XD			1R			2R	QF	SF	F
75+	MS			1R			2R	QF	SF	F
75+	WS	GS			GS	GS		QF	SF	F
75+	MD			GS	GS		GS	QF	SF	F
75+	WD	GS				GS		GS	SF	F
75+	XD	GS		GS		GS		QF	SF	F
80+	MS	GS			GS	GS		QF	SF	F
80+	MD	GS			GS			GS	SF	F

== Participants ==
1,628 players from 53 nations competed at this edition of the championships, becomes the largest event in the World Senior Championships history:

Africa (3)

- Ghana (1)
- Réunion (1)
- South Africa (5)

Asia (17)

- Brunei (1)
- Bangladesh (1)
- Bhutan (2)
- Chinese Taipei (95)
- Hong Kong (47)
- India (193)
- Indonesia (63)
- Japan (88)
- Macau (1)
- Malaysia (68)
- Mongolia (21)
- Nepal (8)
- Singapore (44)
- South Korea (7)
- Sri Lanka (44)
- Thailand (182) (Host)
- United Arab Emirates (53)

Europe (26)

- Austria (14)
- Azerbaijan (3)
- Belgium (10)
- Bulgaria (1)
- Czech Republic (5)
- Denmark (56)
- England (103)
- Finland (28)
- France (99)
- Germany (94)
- Greece (1)
- Iceland (1)
- Ireland (5)
- Israel (2)
- Italy (3)
- Latvia (1)
- Netherlands (13)
- Norway (23)
- Poland (34)
- Romania (12)
- Scotland (12)
- Slovakia (4)
- Spain (19)
- Sweden (32)
- Switzerland (22)
- Ukraine (4)

Oceania (2)

- Australia (27)
- New Zealand (6)

Pan Am (5)

- Canada (41)
- Chile (1)
- Mexico (5)
- Trinidad and Tobago (1)
- United States (21)

=== Detailed table ===
Conf.	Nation	Entries	Players	35+					40+					45+					50+					55+					60+					65+					70+					75+					80+	
Conf.	Nation	Entries	Players	MS	WS	MD	WD	XD	MS	WS	MD	WD	XD	MS	WS	MD	WD	XD	MS	WS	MD	WD	XD	MS	WS	MD	WD	XD	MS	WS	MD	WD	XD	MS	WS	MD	WD	XD	MS	WS	MD	WD	XD	MS	WS	MD	WD	XD	MS	MD
Africa	Ghana	1	1																1																															
Africa	Réunion	2	1																	1		0.5	0.5																											
Africa	South Africa	7	5											2		1													1		0.5	0.5	0.5											1		0.5				
Asia	Brunei	1.5	1																										1		0.5																			
Asia	Bangladesh	0.5	1													0.5																																		
Asia	Bhutan	2	2																		1																													
Asia	Chinese Taipei	94	95	3	3	3.5	4	4	4	3	4	2	4	4	2	4	1	4	4	2	2	3	3	4		4	1	3	4	4	2	2	3		1			0.5	2											
Asia	Hong Kong	50.5	47	4	2	4	2	3	4	2	4	3	4	3		4		1	4		1		1	1	1	1	0.5	0.5					0.5																	
Asia	India	164.5	192	4	4	3	3	3	4	3	4	3	4	4	3	4	4	4	4	4	4	4	4	4	4	4	4	4	4	4	4	3.5	4	4	4	4	4	4	4	2	4	1	3	4	4	4	2	4		
Asia	Indonesia	62.5	63	3		3.5	0.5	1.5	3		2	1	3	3	2	3	1	2	4	1	3.5		2.5	4	1	4		1.5	2		3.5		1	2		1.5		0.5			2									
Asia	Japan	110	88	4	4	3	3	4	4	2	4	1	4	4	3	4	3	4	4	2	4	4	4	4	1	3	1	2	3	1	1		1	4	1	2	1	2	1	1	1		1	2	1	1	1	2	2	1
Asia	Macau	1.5	1	1		0.5																																												
Asia	Malaysia	62.5	68	3	1	2.5	1	1.5	4		3	1	1	2		4	1	1	4		3		2	2		1			4		3			2		1	0.5	1	4		3			3		1			1	1
Asia	Mongolia	26	21	1				1		1					3		1		4	2	1	2			3		2	4	1																					
Asia	Nepal	7	8																					1		2					1			2		1														
Asia	Singapore	53	44	2	1	2		1.5	3	1	3	1	2	4		2			4		4		1	1		1			1	2		1	1	4		3	0.5	2.5	1		1			2		0.5				
Asia	South Korea	6	7																			1		2		1		1					1																	
Asia	Sri Lanka	51	44	4	1	3		2	4	2	2.5	1.5	1.5	4	1	3.5	0.5	1	3	1	1.5	1	2.5	2		0.5	0.5		1		0.5				1			0.5	3		1.5									
Asia	Thailand (H)	157.5	182	4	4	4	2	3	4	4	5	3	5	4	4	5	4	4	4	3	5	3.5	4.5	4	3	4	4	4	4	3	5	4	4	4	3	5	3	3.5	4	1	4	1	4	1	1	2			2	1
Asia	United Arab Emirates	54.5	53	4		4	1	2	4	1	4		2	4	2	3	1	2	4		4		1	4	1	4			2		0.5																			
Europe	Austria	23	14	2		1					0.5	0.5	1	3	1	1.5	1	1	4		1.5		1		1														2		1									
Europe	Azerbaijan	3.5	3																							0.5								2		1														
Europe	Belgium	16	10											1		1			1					1	1	1	0.5	1	1		1		1	1		0.5			1		0.5		1		1		0.5			
Europe	Bulgaria	0.5	1																																						0.5									
Europe	Czech Republic	9	5		1		1							2	1	1		1.5	1		0.5																													
Europe	Denmark	82.5	56	3		1.5	2	2.5	1	2	2	0.5	2	4	2	2	1	3.5	4	4	3	2.5	4		1		1.5	2	4		2.5	0.5	3.5	4		3.5	0.5	1.5	3		1			2	2	1	1	1.5		
Europe	England	145.5	103	4	2	4	2.5	3.5	4	2	2.5	1.5	3.5	4	2	4	2	4	4	3	0.5	2	3	4	4	1	4	3	4	4	4	2.5	4	4	3	4	2	4	4	4	4	3	4	3	1	3	2.5	5	2	0.5
Europe	Finland	36	28			1		0.5	3		2.5		1	2		0.5	0.5	0.5	2	1	2	1	1	3	1	2.5		1.5	4		3.5		0.5											1		0.5				
Europe	France	123.5	99	4	4	4	4	4	4	2	3.5	1.5	3	4	3	3	2	3	4	2	4	0.5	3.5	4	4	3	3.5	4	4	3	4	3	4	4	4	3	2	4	3		1.5		1						1	0.5
Europe	Germany	136.5	93	4	4	1	4	4	4	3	4	1.5	4	4	3	3.5	3	3.5	4	3	1.5	1.5	3	4	4	4	2.5	4	4	4	2	3	4	4	4	4	2.5	4	4	1	3	1	2	3	1	1.5		1	1	0.5
Europe	Greece	1	1																						1																									
Europe	Iceland	2	1									0.5			1			0.5																																
Europe	Ireland	5	5																											1	1	1.5	1.5																	
Europe	Israel	2.5	2																									0.5			1																			
Europe	Italy	4	3																				1	1		1								1																
Europe	Latvia	1.5	1																					1		0.5																								
Europe	Netherlands	22	14											1		1		0.5	1	2		1	1				0.5	1		3		1.5	1	2		1						0.5	1	1		0.5			1	0.5
Europe	Norway	38.5	23							1			0.5	3	1	2	0.5	1	4	2	2	1.5	2	2	3		1	2						3		1			2		1								2	1
Europe	Poland	51.5	34	3	1	1.5	1	2.5	1	3	1.5	3	3.5	4	3	2	3	3	2	1	1		2		1		1		1	2	1	1	1		1			0.5												
Europe	Romania	16.5	12	1		1				1	1	1	2	4	1	1		2									1	0.5																						
Europe	Scotland	17.5	12				0.5	0.5	1		1			1		1		1	1	1	1.5	1	2	1										1		0.5		1		1		0.5								
Europe	Slovakia	4	4	1		1		1																1																										
Europe	Spain	32	19		2		1.5	2	3	3	2	1	4						2		1			2		1.5	1	1	1				1	2		1					1.5					0.5				
Europe	Sweden	56.5	32		2		1	1.5	3	1	1.5	0.5	1	3			0.5	0.5	4	2	2.5	1	3	4	1	2.5	0.5	2	4		2.5		2	2		1		0.5	3		1.5			1		0.5		0.5		
Europe	Switzerland	35.5	22	2	1	2	0.5	2	4	1	1	0.5	1	2		0.5			1		1			1	1	0.5	1	1.5	2	2	1	1	2	2		1														
Europe	Ukraine	6	4		1		0.5	0.5	2		1	0.5	0.5																																					
Oceania	Australia	32	27	4		4		1	1					2		0.5			2	1	2.5	1	0.5	3		1.5			2		1		1	3		1														
Oceania	New Zealand	8	6	1					1		1			2															1	1			1																	
Pan Am	Canada	61	41	4		2.5	1	3.5	1	1		1	0.5	3	2	2.5	1	1	3		2	1	2	3	1	1	1	2	1	2	0.5	1	2.5	3		2.5			2	2	0.5	1	2						1	
Pan Am	Chile	1	1	1																																														
Pan Am	Mexico	7	5						1		1			1					1					1		1			1																					
Pan Am	Trinidad and Tobago	1	1																1																															
Pan Am	United States	26.5	21	1		0.5		0.5	1	1	1.5		1	2				0.5	2		1.5			4		1		1	3	1	0.5		1	2		0.5														
Total (53 NOCs)		1,923	1,627	72	37	58	36	56	73	40	63	30	59	90	40	65	31	50	92	38	62	33	59	74	38	52	32	43	66	37	47	26	47	62	22	43	16	30	43	12	31	8	19	24	11	16	7	14	13	6
Conf.	Nation	Entries	Players	MS	WS	MD	WD	XD	MS	WS	MD	WD	XD	MS	WS	MD	WD	XD	MS	WS	MD	WD	XD	MS	WS	MD	WD	XD	MS	WS	MD	WD	XD	MS	WS	MD	WD	XD	MS	WS	MD	WD	XD	MS	WS	MD	WD	XD	MS	MD
Conf.	Nation	Entries	Players	35+					40+					45+					50+					55+					60+					65+					70+					75+					80+	

== Summary ==
=== Medal table ===
* Host nation (Thailand)

2025 BWF World Senior Championships medal table
Rank	Nation	Gold	Silver	Bronze	Total
1	Denmark	8	3	4	15
2	Indonesia	7.5	1.5	3.5	12.5
3	Thailand*	7	7	9	23
4	Japan	4	7	14	25
5	Scotland	2.5	0	1.5	4
6	England	2	6.5	13	21.5
7	Chinese Taipei	2	2	9	13
8	Malaysia	2	2	5	9
9	Iceland	2	0	0	2
10	Netherlands	1.5	1	4	6.5
11	Singapore	1.5	0	5	6.5
12	United States	1.5	0	1	2.5
13	South Africa	1.5	0	0	1.5
14	Sweden	1	2	3.5	6.5
15	Poland	1	1.5	1	3.5
16	Ireland	1	0	0	1
17	Canada	0.5	0	7	7.5
18	Finland	0.5	0	1	1.5
19	Germany	0	3.5	1	4.5
20	Sri Lanka	0	2.5	0	2.5
21	India	0	2	5	7
22	France	0	2	2	4
23	Australia	0	1	0	1
23	Romania	0	1	0	1
23	Switzerland	0	1	0	1
26	Belgium	0	0.5	1	1.5
27	Hong Kong	0	0	1.5	1.5
28	Czech Republic	0	0	1	1
28	Norway	0	0	1	1
Totals (29 entries)		47	47	94	188

=== Medalists ===
Event	Gold	Silver	Bronze
35+
Men's singles	(Thailand) Suppanyu Avihingsanon	(Sri Lanka) Niluka Karunaratne	(Singapore) Ashton Chen
Men's singles	(Thailand) Suppanyu Avihingsanon	(Sri Lanka) Niluka Karunaratne	(Japan) Kazunori Shiozawa
Women's singles	(Singapore) Xing Aiying	(Japan) Konomi Nomura	(Czech Republic) Martina Benešová
Women's singles	(Singapore) Xing Aiying	(Japan) Konomi Nomura	(Thailand) Piyarat Jarajapreedee
Men's doubles	(Singapore) Danny Bawa Chrisnanta (Indonesia) Fernando Kurniawan	(France) Laurent Constantin (France) Brice Leverdez	(Japan) Yuki Homma (Japan) Masakazu Mouri
Men's doubles	(Singapore) Danny Bawa Chrisnanta (Indonesia) Fernando Kurniawan	(France) Laurent Constantin (France) Brice Leverdez	(Thailand) Pattarajarin Sirikunakorn (Thailand) Thimmadee Teerakawong
Women's doubles	(Chinese Taipei) Cheng Yu-jou (Chinese Taipei) Lee Tai-an	(Japan) Saki Matsumura (Japan) Konomi Nomura	(Scotland) Jody Barral (Indonesia) Debby Susanto
Women's doubles	(Chinese Taipei) Cheng Yu-jou (Chinese Taipei) Lee Tai-an	(Japan) Saki Matsumura (Japan) Konomi Nomura	(Japan) Aya Asari (Japan) Yorika Kawata
Mixed doubles	(Indonesia) Hendra Setiawan^{‡} (Indonesia) Debby Susanto	(Thailand) Nawut Thanateeratam (Thailand) Vacharaporn Munkit	(Singapore) Danny Bawa Chrisnanta (Singapore) Xing Aiying
Mixed doubles	(Indonesia) Hendra Setiawan^{‡} (Indonesia) Debby Susanto	(Thailand) Nawut Thanateeratam (Thailand) Vacharaporn Munkit	(France) Brice Leverdez (France) Julie Leverdez
40+
Men's singles	(Malaysia) Ooi Swee Khoon	(Japan) Daichi Hanamoto	(England) Joel Gayle
Men's singles	(Malaysia) Ooi Swee Khoon	(Japan) Daichi Hanamoto	(Indonesia) Muhammad Muhammad
Women's singles	(Thailand) Molthila Kitjanon	(Chinese Taipei) Huang Chia-hsin	(Hong Kong) Fung Ying
Women's singles	(Thailand) Molthila Kitjanon	(Chinese Taipei) Huang Chia-hsin	(Denmark) Christina Aagaard
Men's doubles	(United States) Tony Gunawan (Indonesia) Hendra Setiawan	(Thailand) Boonsak Ponsana (Thailand) Jakrapan Thanathiratham	(Chinese Taipei) Chang Chih-shin (Chinese Taipei) Wang Chih-kai
Men's doubles	(United States) Tony Gunawan (Indonesia) Hendra Setiawan	(Thailand) Boonsak Ponsana (Thailand) Jakrapan Thanathiratham	(Poland) Michał Łogosz (Poland) Przemysław Wacha
Women's doubles	(Iceland) Drífa Harðardóttir^{‡} (Denmark) Gry Hermansen	(Romania) Florentina Constantinescu (Romania) Irina Popescu	(Canada) Jody Patrick (Canada) Lindsay Reynolds
Women's doubles	(Iceland) Drífa Harðardóttir^{‡} (Denmark) Gry Hermansen	(Romania) Florentina Constantinescu (Romania) Irina Popescu	(Chinese Taipei) Teng Tao-chun (Chinese Taipei) Tsai Hui-min
Mixed doubles	(Indonesia) Muhammad Muhammad (Canada) Jody Patrick^{‡}	(Indonesia) Unang Rahmat^{‡} (Sri Lanka) Nadeesha Gayanthi	(Finland) Jesper von Hertzen (Finland) Emmi Heikkinen
Mixed doubles	(Indonesia) Muhammad Muhammad (Canada) Jody Patrick^{‡}	(Indonesia) Unang Rahmat^{‡} (Sri Lanka) Nadeesha Gayanthi	(India) Shetty Abhinand (India) Sangeetha Mari
45+
Men's singles	(Denmark) Casper Lund	(Japan) Hosemari Fujimoto	(France) Eric Wasylyk
Men's singles	(Denmark) Casper Lund	(Japan) Hosemari Fujimoto	(India) Abhinn Shyam Gupta
Women's singles	(Iceland) Drífa Harðardóttir	(Poland) Dominika Guzik-Płuchowska	(Canada) Jody Patrick
Women's singles	(Iceland) Drífa Harðardóttir	(Poland) Dominika Guzik-Płuchowska	(Japan) Maki Jin
Men's doubles	(Denmark) Henrik K. Hansen (Denmark) Casper Lund	(Thailand) Phongthep Imkaew (Thailand) Worapoj Somchariya	(Japan) Hosemari Fujimoto (Japan) Masayuki Matsumoto
Men's doubles	(Denmark) Henrik K. Hansen (Denmark) Casper Lund	(Thailand) Phongthep Imkaew (Thailand) Worapoj Somchariya	(Denmark) Mads Friborg (England) Carl Jennings
Women's doubles	(Japan) Fumika Hashimoto (Japan) Akiko Nakashima	(Thailand) Thanawan Pramoolsap (Thailand) Rutjaporn Songsarn	(England) Rebecca Pantaney (England) Lynne Swan
Women's doubles	(Japan) Fumika Hashimoto (Japan) Akiko Nakashima	(Thailand) Thanawan Pramoolsap (Thailand) Rutjaporn Songsarn	(Thailand) Thitikarn Duangsiri (Thailand) Sukanya Limsunant
Mixed doubles	(Denmark) Gregers Schytt (Iceland) Drífa Harðardóttir	(Japan) Hosemari Fujimoto (Japan) Fumika Hashimoto	(Denmark) Lars Klintrup (Denmark) Leila Soon Jørgensen
Mixed doubles	(Denmark) Gregers Schytt (Iceland) Drífa Harðardóttir	(Japan) Hosemari Fujimoto (Japan) Fumika Hashimoto	(United States) Tony Gunawan (England) Rebecca Pantaney
50+
Men's singles	(Indonesia) Marleve Mainaky	(Denmark) Gregers Schytt	(England) Carl Jennings
Men's singles	(Indonesia) Marleve Mainaky	(Denmark) Gregers Schytt	(Chinese Taipei) Liao Lien Sheng
Women's singles	(Denmark) Janne Vang Nielsen	(Sri Lanka) Renu Chandrika Hettiarachchige	(Chinese Taipei) Shyu Yuh Ling
Women's singles	(Denmark) Janne Vang Nielsen	(Sri Lanka) Renu Chandrika Hettiarachchige	(India) Leena Dhapre
Men's doubles	(Indonesia) Adi Ariyadi (Indonesia) Eko Hamiseno	(Indonesia) Hariyanto Arbi (Indonesia) Marleve Mainaky	(Malaysia) Goh Cheng Huan (Malaysia) Ong Ewe Hock
Men's doubles	(Indonesia) Adi Ariyadi (Indonesia) Eko Hamiseno	(Indonesia) Hariyanto Arbi (Indonesia) Marleve Mainaky	(Malaysia) Kah Kok Cheong (Malaysia) Lum Chee Meng
Women's doubles	(Denmark) Majken Asmussen (Denmark) Dorte Steenberg	(Chinese Taipei) Kao Shin-li (Chinese Taipei) Shyu Yuh-ling	(Scotland) Lynne Campbell (Scotland) Helen Milne
Women's doubles	(Denmark) Majken Asmussen (Denmark) Dorte Steenberg	(Chinese Taipei) Kao Shin-li (Chinese Taipei) Shyu Yuh-ling	(Thailand) Anuda Boonyakiat (Thailand) Puangthip Kaosamaang
Mixed doubles	(Denmark) Carsten Loesch (Denmark) Dorte Steenberg	(England) Carl Jennings (England) Caroline Hale	(Japan) Shinichi Nishida (Japan) Mikiko Shimada
Mixed doubles	(Denmark) Carsten Loesch (Denmark) Dorte Steenberg	(England) Carl Jennings (England) Caroline Hale	(Thailand) Supakorn Wongsavit (Thailand) Boonyanuch Tanthammaroj
55+
Men's singles	(Indonesia) Made Chandra Berata	(Thailand) Karun Kasayapanant	(Sweden) Stefan Grahn
Men's singles	(Indonesia) Made Chandra Berata	(Thailand) Karun Kasayapanant	(Chinese Taipei) Wu Chang-jun
Women's singles	(England) Caroline Hale	(Germany) Tanja Eberl	(Japan) Reiko Nakamura
Women's singles	(England) Caroline Hale	(Germany) Tanja Eberl	(India) Poonam Tatwawadi
Men's doubles	(Chinese Taipei) Liu En-horng (Chinese Taipei) Tu Tung-sheng	(Thailand) Chatchai Boonmee (Thailand) Karun Kasayapanant	(Sweden) Erik Ferenius (Sweden) Stefan Grahn
Men's doubles	(Chinese Taipei) Liu En-horng (Chinese Taipei) Tu Tung-sheng	(Thailand) Chatchai Boonmee (Thailand) Karun Kasayapanant	(Thailand) Wattana Ampunsuwan (Thailand) Surasak Lawwattanathaworn
Women's doubles	(Thailand) Rojjana Boonprathump (Thailand) Peeruwan Boonyakiat	(Germany) Tanja Eberl (Netherlands) Elke Nijsse-Drews	(England) Jane Ashfold (England) Betty Blair
Women's doubles	(Thailand) Rojjana Boonprathump (Thailand) Peeruwan Boonyakiat	(Germany) Tanja Eberl (Netherlands) Elke Nijsse-Drews	(Japan) Reiko Nakamura (Japan) Ikuko Ohira
Mixed doubles	(Denmark) Bo Sorensen (Denmark) Lene Struwe Andersen	(India) B.V.S.K Lingeswara Rao (India) Suzanne Venglet	(Chinese Taipei) Liu En-horng (Hong Kong) Chan Oi Ni
Mixed doubles	(Denmark) Bo Sorensen (Denmark) Lene Struwe Andersen	(India) B.V.S.K Lingeswara Rao (India) Suzanne Venglet	(Chinese Taipei) Su Jung-li (Chinese Taipei) Kuo Hsiu-yen
60+
Men's singles	(Thailand) Narong Vanichitsarakul	(Sweden) Jan-Eric Antonsson	(Malaysia) Chang Kim Long
Men's singles	(Thailand) Narong Vanichitsarakul	(Sweden) Jan-Eric Antonsson	(Chinese Taipei) Chang Wen-sung
Women's singles	(United States) Bin Lin	(Switzerland) Bettina Villars	(Netherlands) Jeannette van der Werff
Women's singles	(United States) Bin Lin	(Switzerland) Bettina Villars	(Netherlands) Grace Kakiay
Men's doubles	(Thailand) Surachai Makkasasithorn (Thailand) Narong Vanichitsarakul	(Sweden) Nils Carlson (Sweden) Fredrik Ingemansson	(Indonesia) Bobby Ertanto (Indonesia) Eddy Hartono
Men's doubles	(Thailand) Surachai Makkasasithorn (Thailand) Narong Vanichitsarakul	(Sweden) Nils Carlson (Sweden) Fredrik Ingemansson	(Thailand) Worapoj Chantakij (Thailand) Nattapol Sanlekanun
Women's doubles	(Republic of Ireland) Pamela Peard (Republic of Ireland) Sian Williams	(France) Regine Glondu (France) Isabelle Marrie	(Netherlands) Sandra Kroon (Netherlands) Jeannette van der Werff
Women's doubles	(Republic of Ireland) Pamela Peard (Republic of Ireland) Sian Williams	(France) Regine Glondu (France) Isabelle Marrie	(Thailand) Juthatip Banjongsilp (Thailand) Chitlada Chatrungsun
Mixed doubles	(Sweden) Jan-Eric Antonsson (Denmark) Hanne Bertelsen	(Denmark) Jan Bertram Petersen (Netherlands) Jeannette van der Werff	(Chinese Taipei) Chang Wen-sung (United States) Bin Lin
Mixed doubles	(Sweden) Jan-Eric Antonsson (Denmark) Hanne Bertelsen	(Denmark) Jan Bertram Petersen (Netherlands) Jeannette van der Werff	(Chinese Taipei) Wang Shun-chen (Chinese Taipei) Sun Tsai-ching
65+
Men's singles	(Indonesia) Hastomo Arbi	(Japan) Hiroyuki Koike	(Singapore) Foo Kon Fai
Men's singles	(Indonesia) Hastomo Arbi	(Japan) Hiroyuki Koike	(Canada) Jack Keith Priestman
Women's singles	(Poland) Maria Brzeznicka	(Germany) Heidi Bender	(England) Linda Wood
Women's singles	(Poland) Maria Brzeznicka	(Germany) Heidi Bender	(Japan) Kuniko Yamamoto
Men's doubles	(Indonesia) Hastomo Arbi (Indonesia) Simbarsono Sutanto	(Australia) Garry Silvester (Australia) Loke Poh Wong	(Denmark) Joergen Jepsen (Denmark) Birger Steenberg
Men's doubles	(Indonesia) Hastomo Arbi (Indonesia) Simbarsono Sutanto	(Australia) Garry Silvester (Australia) Loke Poh Wong	(Singapore) Foo Kon Fai (Singapore) Ng Kok Seong
Women's doubles	(Japan) Hitomi Koga (Japan) Kuniko Yamamoto	(England) Susan Coulson (England) Pauline Williams	(England) Sue Sheen (England) Linda Wood
Women's doubles	(Japan) Hitomi Koga (Japan) Kuniko Yamamoto	(England) Susan Coulson (England) Pauline Williams	(Thailand) Supannee Boonchuay (Thailand) Poonsuk Wattananan
Mixed doubles	(Scotland) Dan Travers (Scotland) Christine Black	(Denmark) Birger Steenberg (Poland) Maria Brzeznicka	(Singapore) Foo Kon Fai (Singapore) Bessie Ong
Mixed doubles	(Scotland) Dan Travers (Scotland) Christine Black	(Denmark) Birger Steenberg (Poland) Maria Brzeznicka	(Germany) Rolf Rüsseler (Germany) Heidi Bender
70+
Men's singles	(Malaysia) Bruni Garip	(Denmark) Jesper Helledie	(India) Philip Bency
Men's singles	(Malaysia) Bruni Garip	(Denmark) Jesper Helledie	(Japan) Nobuyuki Aoyama
Women's singles	(Scotland) Christine Black	(India) Jessie Philip	(Canada) Siew Har Hong
Women's singles	(Scotland) Christine Black	(India) Jessie Philip	(Canada) Marcia Jackson
Men's doubles	(Thailand) Attakorn Maensamut (Thailand) Jiamsak Panitchaikul	(Thailand) Ittirak Raveejarudon (Thailand) Pongsilpa Ritipong	(Indonesia) Frits Hermanus Mainaky (Indonesia) Rudy Heryanto
Men's doubles	(Thailand) Attakorn Maensamut (Thailand) Jiamsak Panitchaikul	(Thailand) Ittirak Raveejarudon (Thailand) Pongsilpa Ritipong	(Malaysia) Chan Wan Seong (Malaysia) Bruni Garip
Women's doubles	(Scotland) Christine Black (Netherlands) Marjan Ridder	(England) Brenda Creasey (England) Janet B Williams	(Canada) Siew Har Hong (Canada) Marcia Jackson
Women's doubles	(Scotland) Christine Black (Netherlands) Marjan Ridder	(England) Brenda Creasey (England) Janet B Williams	(England) Anna Bowskill (England) Sylvia Penn
Mixed doubles	(Netherlands) Rob Ridder (Netherlands) Marjan Ridder	(England) Chris Hockey (England) Brenda Creasey	(England) Peter Emptage (England) Janet B Williams
Mixed doubles	(Netherlands) Rob Ridder (Netherlands) Marjan Ridder	(England) Chris Hockey (England) Brenda Creasey	(Canada) William Metcalfe (Canada) Marcia Jackson
75+
Men's singles	(South Africa) Johan Croukamp	(Japan) Hirohisa Toshijima	(Sweden) Stefan Ohrås
Men's singles	(South Africa) Johan Croukamp	(Japan) Hirohisa Toshijima	(Malaysia) Lim Chong Sek
Women's singles	(Japan) Kinuko Manabe	(Germany) Elvira Richter	(England) Mary Jenner
Women's singles	(Japan) Kinuko Manabe	(Germany) Elvira Richter	(Belgium) Nelly Halsberghe
Men's doubles	(South Africa) Johan Croukamp (Finland) Carl-Johan Nybergh	(England) Robert J Bell (England) Edward Hayes	(Denmark) Per Dabelsteen (Sweden) Stefan Ohrås
Men's doubles	(South Africa) Johan Croukamp (Finland) Carl-Johan Nybergh	(England) Robert J Bell (England) Edward Hayes	(Japan) Shigeru Kondo (Japan) Hiroshi Yoshida
Women's doubles	(Japan) Kinuko Manabe (Japan) Fumiko Sakuma	(Belgium) Nelly Halsberghe (England) Jan Hewett	(England) Sue Awcock (England) Sylvia Gill
Women's doubles	(Japan) Kinuko Manabe (Japan) Fumiko Sakuma	(Belgium) Nelly Halsberghe (England) Jan Hewett	(England) Vicki Betts (England) Mary Jenner
Mixed doubles	(Sweden) Stefan Ohrås (Denmark) Jena Robdrup Andreassen	(England) Robert J Bell (England) Jan Hewett	(England) Jim Garrett (England) Mary Jenner
Mixed doubles	(Sweden) Stefan Ohrås (Denmark) Jena Robdrup Andreassen	(England) Robert J Bell (England) Jan Hewett	(Japan) Hirohisa Toshijima (Japan) Fumiko Sakuma
80+
Men's singles	(England) Roger Baldwin	(Malaysia) Leong Kim Swee	(Japan) Akira Hirota
Men's singles	(England) Roger Baldwin	(Malaysia) Leong Kim Swee	(Netherlands) Karel Tokromo
Men's doubles	(Thailand) Seri Chintanaseri (Thailand) Pirachitra Surakkhaka	(Malaysia) Ching Kon Kong (Malaysia) Leong Kim Swee	(Norway) Daniel Ask (Norway) Knut Sverre Liland
Men's doubles	(Thailand) Seri Chintanaseri (Thailand) Pirachitra Surakkhaka	(Malaysia) Ching Kon Kong (Malaysia) Leong Kim Swee	(Japan) Akira Hirota (Japan) Shinjiro Matsuda
