= Jody Patrick =

Canadian badminton player (born 1978)

Personal information
- National team: Canada
- Born: June 14, 1978 (age 48) Calgary, Canada

Sport
- Country: Canada
- Sport: Badminton
- Event: Mixed doubles
- Club: Calgary Winter Club
- Partner: Mike Beres
Medal record
World Senior Championships
Gold medal – first place	2025 Pattaya	Mixed doubles 40+
Bronze medal – third place	2025 Pattaya	Women's doubles 40+
Bronze medal – third place	2025 Pattaya	Women's singles 45+
Pan American Games
Silver medal – second place	Santo Domingo 2003	Mixed doubles

Jody Patrick (born 14 June 1978) is a female badminton player from Canada.

Patrick competed in badminton at the 2004 Summer Olympics in mixed doubles with partner Mike Beres. They lost to Fredrik Bergström and Johanna Persson of Sweden in the round of 32.

== Achievements ==
=== World Senior Championships ===
Women's singles

Year	Age	Venue	Opponent	Score	Result	Ref
2025	45+	Eastern National Sports Training Centre, Pattaya, Thailand	(Iceland) Drífa Harðardóttir	Walkover	Bronze	

Women's doubles

Year	Age	Venue	Partner	Opponent	Score	Result	Ref
2025	40+	Eastern National Sports Training Centre, Pattaya, Thailand	(Canada) Lindsay Reynolds	(Iceland) Drífa Harðardóttir (Denmark) Gry Hermansen	11–21, 12–21	Bronze	

Mixed doubles

Year	Age	Venue	Partner	Opponent	Score	Result	Ref
2025	40+	Eastern National Sports Training Centre, Pattaya, Thailand	(Indonesia) Muhammad Muhammad	(Indonesia) Unang Rahmat (Sri Lanka) Nadeesha Gayanthi	21–18, 21–11	Gold	
