= Jerzy Przybylski =

Polish actor (1923–1999)

- Born: 27 April 1923; Lviv
- Died: 24 July 1999; Warsaw
- Years active: 1947–1991

Jerzy Przybylski (27 April 1923 – 24 July 1999) was a Polish actor. He made over 25 appearances in film and television. He starred in the 1986–1987 television series Zmiennicy.
