= Michał Łogosz =

Polish badminton player (born 1977)

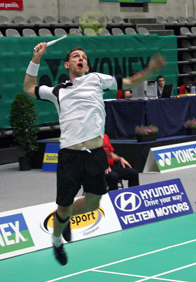

Personal information
- Born: Michał Andrzej Łogosz; 23 November 1977 (age 48) Płock, Poland
- Height: 1.90 m (6 ft 3 in)
- Weight: 80 kg (176 lb)

Sport
- Country: Poland
- Sport: Badminton
- Handedness: Right
- Coached by: Rrszard Borek
- Event: Men's doubles

Men's doubles
- BWF profile
Medal record
Men's badminton
Representing Poland
World Senior Championships
Bronze medal – third place	2025 Pattaya	Men's doubles 40+
European Championships
Bronze medal – third place	2000 Glasgow	Men's doubles
Bronze medal – third place	2002 Malmö	Men's doubles
Bronze medal – third place	2004 Geneva	Men's doubles
Bronze medal – third place	2006 Den Bosch	Men's doubles
European Mixed Team Championships
Bronze medal – third place	2008 Herning	Mixed team
European Men's Team Championships
Silver medal – second place	2010 Warsaw	Men's team

Michał Andrzej Łogosz (born 23 November 1977) is a Polish badminton player from Litpol-Malow Suwałki club. He was named best sportsman in Płock in 1995.

== Career ==
Łogosz started playing badminton when he was in primary school, and in 1992, he representing his club at the national league tournament. In 2000, he was selected to join the national team.

Łogosz competed in badminton at the 2000 Summer Olympics and in 2004 Summer Olympics, both times in men's doubles with partner Robert Mateusiak. In 2000, they defeated David Bamford and Peter Blackburn of Australia in the first round, but lost in the round of 16 to Simon Archer and Nathan Robertson of United Kingdom. In 2004, they defeated Tri Kush Aryanto and Sigit Budiarto of Indonesia in the first round, before being defeated in the round of 16 by Kim Dong-moon and Ha Tae-kwon of Korea.

Łogosz and Mateusiak won bronze medals at the European Championships in 2000, 2002, 2004 and 2006.

At the 2012 Summer Olympics, he competed with Adam Cwalina in the men's doubles, but was forced to retire from the event with an Achilles injury.

== Achievements ==
=== World Senior Championships ===
Men's doubles
Year	Age	Venue	Partner	Opponent	Score	Result	Ref.
2025	40+	Eastern National Sports Training Centre; Pattaya, Thailand	(Poland) Przemysław Wacha	(United States) Tony Gunawan (Indonesia) Hendra Setiawan	17–21, 18–21	Bronze	

=== European Championships ===
Men's doubles
Year	Venue	Partner	Opponent	Score	Result
2000	Kelvin Hall International Sports Arena; Glasgow, Scotland	(Poland) Robert Mateusiak	(Sweden) Peter Axelsson (Sweden) Pär-Gunnar Jönsson	6–15, 15–10, 11–15	Bronze
2002	Baltiska hallen Malmö, Sweden	(Poland) Robert Mateusiak	(Denmark) Jens Eriksen (Denmark) Martin Lundgaard Hansen	1–7, 6–8, 1–7	Bronze
2004	Queue d’Arve Sport Center; Geneva, Switzerland	(Poland) Robert Mateusiak	(Denmark) Jens Eriksen (Denmark) Martin Lundgaard Hansen	9–15, 15–12, 6–15	Bronze
2006	Maaspoort Sports and Events; Den Bosch, Netherlands	(Poland) Robert Mateusiak	(Denmark) Jens Eriksen (Denmark) Martin Lundgaard Hansen	19–21, 21–23	Bronze

=== BWF Grand Prix ===
The BWF Grand Prix had two levels, the Grand Prix and Grand Prix Gold. It was a series of badminton tournaments sanctioned by the Badminton World Federation (BWF) and played between 2007 and 2017. The World Badminton Grand Prix was sanctioned by the International Badminton Federation from 1983 to 2006.

Men's doubles
Year	Tournament	Partner	Opponent	Score	Result
1999	Polish Open	(Poland) Robert Mateusiak	(Hong Kong) Ma Che Kong (Hong Kong) Yau Tsz Yuk	15–13, 7–15, 15–9	(gold) Winner
2006	Bitburger Open	(Poland) Robert Mateusiak	(Indonesia) Hendra Aprida Gunawan (Indonesia) Joko Riyadi	21–13, 21–13	(gold) Winner
2011	Dutch Open	(Poland) Adam Cwalina	(Germany) Ingo Kindervater (Germany) Johannes Schöttler	21–19, 19–21, 21–14	(gold) Winner

BWF Grand Prix Gold tournament
BWF Grand Prix tournament

=== BWF International Challenge/Series/European Circuit ===
Men's doubles
Year	Tournament	Partner	Opponent	Score	Result
1997	Slovak International	(Poland) Kamil Turonek	(Austria) Harald Koch (Austria) Jürgen Koch	9–15, 5–15	(silver) Runner-up
1998	Hungarian International	(Poland) Robert Mateusiak	(Denmark) Joachim Fischer Nielsen (Denmark) Kasper Ødum	11–15, 15–8, 15–4	(gold) Winner
1999	French International	(Poland) Robert Mateusiak	(England) Anthony Clark (England) Ian Sullivan	11–15, 10–15	(silver) Runner-up
2000	Dutch International	(Poland) Robert Mateusiak	(Bulgaria) Mihail Popov (Bulgaria) Svetoslav Stoyanov	11–15, 15–9, 9–15	(silver) Runner-up
2000	Croatian International	(Poland) Robert Mateusiak	(Bulgaria) Mihail Popov (Bulgaria) Svetoslav Stoyanov	17–16, 13–15, 15–12	(gold) Winner
2000	Victorian International	(Poland) Robert Mateusiak	(China) Dong Jiong (China) Jiang Xin	15–10, 17–15	(gold) Winner
2001	Spanish International	(Poland) Robert Mateusiak	(Spain) José Antonio Crespo (Spain) Sergio Llopis	15–3, 15–10	(gold) Winner
2001	Croatian International	(Poland) Robert Mateusiak	(Germany) Kristof Hopp (Germany) Thomas Tesche	7–15, 13–15	(silver) Runner-up
2001	Austrian International	(Poland) Robert Mateusiak	(Denmark) Mathias Boe (Denmark) Thomas Hovgaard	15–13, 15–3	(gold) Winner
2002	Portugal International	(Poland) Robert Mateusiak	(England) Peter Jeffrey (England) Ian Palethorpe	8–7, 7–2, 7–3	(gold) Winner
2002	Polish International	(Poland) Robert Mateusiak	(Denmark) Jesper Thomsen (Denmark) Tommy Sørensen	1–7, 7–3, 7–3, 3–7, 7–3	(gold) Winner
2002	Slovak International	(Poland) Robert Mateusiak	(Russia) Stanislav Pukhov (Russia) Nikolai Zuyev	10–15, 15–8, 12–15	(silver) Runner-up
2003	Polish International	(Poland) Robert Mateusiak	(Sweden) Imanuel Hirschfeld (Sweden) Jörgen Olsson	11–15, 15–2, 15–1	(gold) Winner
2003	Austrian International	(Poland) Robert Mateusiak	(Russia) Stanislav Pukhov (Russia) Nikolay Zuev	15–6, 16–17, 15–11	(gold) Winner
2003	Scottish International	(Poland) Robert Mateusiak	(France) Vincent Laigle (France) Svetoslav Stoyanov	15–5, 15–3	(gold) Winner
2003	Bitburger International	(Poland) Robert Mateusiak	(France) Vincent Laigle (France) Svetoslav Stoyanov	15–5, 15–9	(gold) Winner
2004	Swedish International	(Poland) Robert Mateusiak	(Denmark) Joachim Fischer Nielsen (Denmark) Jesper Larsen	4–15, 15–13, 15–12	(gold) Winner
2004	Polish International	(Poland) Robert Mateusiak	(China) Guo Zhendong (China) Xie Zhongbo	15–8, 14–17, 14–17	(silver) Runner-up
2005	Finnish International	(Poland) Robert Mateusiak	(Sweden) Henrik Andersson (Sweden) Fredrik Bergström	6–15, 12–15	(silver) Runner-up
2005	Polish International	(Poland) Robert Mateusiak	(Wales) Matthew Hughes (Wales) Martyn Lewis	15–9, 15–7	(gold) Winner
2006	Polish International	(Poland) Robert Mateusiak	(Wales) Matthew Hughes (Wales) Martyn Lewis	21–18, 21–17	(gold) Winner
2007	Bulgarian International	(Poland) Robert Mateusiak	(France) Erwin Kehlhoffner (France) Svetoslav Stoyanov	Walkover	(gold) Winner
2008	Polish International	(Poland) Robert Mateusiak	(Poland) Adam Cwalina (Poland) Wojciech Szkudlarczyk	21–16, 21–5	(gold) Winner
2008	White Nights	(Poland) Robert Mateusiak	(Russia) Vitalij Durkin (Russia) Aleksandr Nikolaenko	21–6, 21–7	(gold) Winner
2010	White Nights	(Poland) Adam Cwalina	(Russia) Vitalij Durkin (Russia) Alexander Nikolaenko	21–19, 29–27	(gold) Winner
2010	Kharkiv International	(Poland) Adam Cwalina	(Russia) Vladimir Ivanov (Russia) Ivan Sozonov	28–26, 21–15	(gold) Winner
2010	Turkey International	(Poland) Adam Cwalina	(Russia) Vladimir Ivanov (Russia) Ivan Sozonov	12–21, 18–21	(silver) Runner-up
2011	Polish Open	(Poland) Adam Cwalina	(Russia) Vladimir Ivanov (Russia) Ivan Sozonov	21–23, 17–21	(silver) Runner-up
2011	Kharkiv International	(Poland) Adam Cwalina	(Russia) Vladimir Ivanov (Russia) Ivan Sozonov	21–19, 19–21, 16–21	(silver) Runner-up
2011	Belgian International	(Poland) Adam Cwalina	(Austria) Jürgen Koch (Austria) Peter Zauner	21–11, 21–15	(gold) Winner
2011	Brazil International	(Poland) Adam Cwalina	(Russia) Vladimir Ivanov (Russia) Ivan Sozonov	21–16, 14–21, 22–24	(silver) Runner-up
2011	Czech International	(Poland) Adam Cwalina	(Russia) Vitalij Durkin (Russia) Alexandr Nikolaenko	21–13, 21–16	(gold) Winner
2011	Norwegian International	(Poland) Adam Cwalina	(Denmark) Rasmus Bonde (Denmark) Anders Kristiansen	17–21, 18–21	(silver) Runner-up
2011	Irish International	(Poland) Adam Cwalina	(England) Marcus Ellis (England) Peter Mills	21–15, 21–15	(gold) Winner
2012	Polish Open	(Poland) Adam Cwalina	(Russia) Vladimir Ivanov (Russia) Ivan Sozonov	11–21, 13–21	(silver) Runner-up
2013	Spanish Open	(Poland) Łukasz Moreń	(Poland) Adam Cwalina (Poland) Przemysław Wacha	10–21, 21–18, 19–21	(silver) Runner-up

Mixed doubles
Year	Tournament	Partner	Opponent	Score	Result
2005	Polish International	(Poland) Kamila Augustyn	(Poland) Robert Mateusiak (Poland) Nadieżda Kostiuczyk	3–15, 6–15	(silver) Runner-up
2009	Polish International	(Poland) Olga Konon	(Poland) Adam Cwalina (Poland) Malgorzata Kurdelska	23–25, 21–11, 21–7	(gold) Winner

BWF International Challenge tournament
BWF International Series tournament
