= Sahan Pradeep Withana =

Sri Lankan politician

Hon. Sahan Pradeep Withana MP
- සහන් ප්‍රදීප් විතාන சஹான் பிரதீப் விதான

Member of the Parliament for Gampaha District
- Incumbent
- Assumed office 20 August 2020
- Majority: 97,494 Preferential Votes

Personal details
- Party: Sri Lanka Podujana Peramuna
- Other political affiliations: Sri Lanka People's Freedom Alliance

M.W.D. Sahan Pradeep Withana also known as Kadawatha Archimedes is a Sri Lankan politician and a member of the Sri Lankan parliament from Gampaha Electoral District as a member of the Sri Lanka Podujana Peramuna.
