= Mainaky =

Mainaky is a Moluccan surname. Notable people with the surname include:

- Karel Mainaky (born 1977), Indonesian badminton player
- Lyanny Alessandra Mainaky (born 1996), Indonesian badminton player
- Marleve Mainaky (born 1972), Indonesian badminton player
- Rexy Mainaky (born 1968), Indonesian badminton player
