= Lyanny Alessandra Mainaky =

Indonesian badminton player (born 1996)

Personal information
- Born: September 14, 1996 (age 30) Kyushu, Japan
- Years active: 2012–present

Sport
- Country: Indonesia
- Sport: Badminton
- Highest ranking: 41 (May 2019)

Lyanny Alessandra Mainaky (born 14 September 1996) is an Indonesian professional badminton player. The daughter of professional badminton player and Indonesian national coach Rionny Mainaky, she belongs to the second generation of the high-profile Mainaky badminton family. Her uncles Karel Mainaky, Marleve Mainaky and Rexy Mainaky have all represented their country in the sport, which is notable as badminton is one of the country's most popular and successful sports.

== Biography ==
Mainaky was born in Kyushu, Japan on September 14, 1996, into an established family of Indonesian badminton players. Mainaky's family is recognized as one of the most prominent badminton families in Indonesia, where the sport is part of the country's national identity. She is the daughter of professional badminton player and coach Rionny Mainaky and Frilly Karundeng, who was also a professional badminton player. Her uncles Karel Mainaky, Marleve Mainaky and Rexy Mainaky have all represented Indonesia in international badminton competition. Uncle Rexy Mainaky helped Indonesia win the country's Olympic gold medal as part of the men's doubles badminton at the 1996 Summer Olympics in Atlanta.

Lyanny Mainaky spent her early years in Japan where her father coached for the Japanese national badminton team. Mainaky began playing badminton in the third grade, where she was coached by her mother. Mainaky's mother claimed her daughter was slow to learn the sport, and was never pushed to play. She soon would develop a love of the sport and desire to improve. In 2007 she became her school's badminton champion, which encouraged her to pursue the sport at a higher level. Later, she was coached by Nozomi Okuhara.

=== Move to Indonesia ===
In 2011, she and her brother Yehezkiel Fritz Mainaky returned to Indonesia from Japan in an effort to represent Indonesia at international competitions. Mainaky's father Rionny Mainaky was reluctant for her to leave Japan, but agreed after seeing her desire to represent their country in sport. While still a child, her move to Indonesia was watched closely by the Indonesian badminton press, who viewed her as the "successor to the Mainaky Badminton dynasty", and as a hope for the country's weaker women's competition. Mainaky and her mother moved to Jakarta, while her father remained in Japan. Mainaky paired with her brother Yehezkiel for mixed doubles competitions. Mainaky turned professional at age 16 with a goal of appearing at the 2020 Summer Olympics in Tokyo.

=== Professional player ===
In 2014, Mainaky was the runner up at the Indonesian Junior Master's competition. The following year, she was recognized as one of the prospective young talents in Indonesia as a recruit to prepare for the 2020 Olympics.

In 2016, she played in a Badminton World Federation Super Series event for the first time when she progressed through the qualifying matches for the Singapore Open. Her appearance at the event received considerable attention in Indonesia due to her family's reputation in the sport.

In 2017, Mainaky represented Indonesia as the only women's singles player to compete at the Badminton World Championships. Mainaky would ultimately not qualify for the 2020 Olympics, with losses on the competitive circuit including the BWF World Championships, Japan Open, the Hong Kong Open, and the Fuzhou China Open.

In 2022, she appeared at the Indonesia International.

In 2023, she competed in AirBadminton for the first time, competing at the ANOC World Beach Games Asian Qualifier.

As a singles player, Mainaky's highest ranking was 41 in the world in 2019 and as a mixed doubles player she was ranked 79th. In 2021, she married Indonesian actor Joshua Otay.
