= 2023 BWF World Senior Championships =

Tournament details
- Dates: 11 – 17 September
- Edition: 11th
- Level: International
- Competitors: 1185 from 44 nations
- Venue: Hwasan Indoor Stadium; Jeonju Indoor Badminton Hall
- Location: Jeonju, South Korea
- Official website: Official website

The 2023 BWF World Senior Championships was a badminton tournament which was held from 11 to 17 September 2023 at two stadiums, Hwasan Indoor Stadium and Jeonju Indoor Badminton Hall in Jeonju, South Korea. This was the first time that South Korea held the world championships.

== Tournament ==
The 2023 BWF World Senior Championships was the eleventh edition of the BWF World Senior Championships, which had been held biannually since 2003. This tournament was organized by the Badminton Korea Association with sanction from the BWF.

=== Venue ===
This international tournament was held at two stadiums in Jeonju, South Korea:

- Hwasan Indoor Stadium, which held 2015 Korea Masters.
- Jeonju Indoor Badminton Hall, which held 2013 and 2014 Korea Masters.

== Participants ==
1185 players from 44 nations competed at this edition of the championships:

Conf.	Nation	35+					40+					45+					50+					55+					60+					65+					70+					75+					Entries	Players
Conf.	Nation	MS	WS	MD	WD	XD	MS	WS	MD	WD	XD	MS	WS	MD	WD	XD	MS	WS	MD	WD	XD	MS	WS	MD	WD	XD	MS	WS	MD	WD	XD	MS	WS	MD	WD	XD	MS	WS	MD	WD	XD	MS	WS	MD	WD	XD	Entries	Players
Africa	South Africa																									1	1										1		0.5								3.5	3
Asia	Bahrain																1				0.5											1															2.5	2
Asia	Cambodia	1		1																																											2	2
Asia	China																										1				1		2		1	0.5											5.5	3
Asia	Chinese Taipei	2	2	4	4	4	4	1	4	1.5	4	2	1	1	1	1	4		3	1	3.5	4	2	3	3	3	3	1	1.5	2	4	1	2	1	1	2											81.5	76
Asia	Hong Kong		1		1	2	3		2		1	1							1				1					1			0.5																14.5	13
Asia	India	4	4	4	4	4	4	4	4	4	4	4	4	4	4	4	3	4	4	3	4	3	4	4	4	4	4	4	4	3	4	3	3	2	2	3	4	4	3	3	2.5	4	3	2		3	157.5	173
Asia	Indonesia			1								1	1	0.5	1	1	4	2	3	0.5	1	3		2		1.5			4			1							0.5								28	30
Asia	Japan	4	4	4	4	4	4	4	3	4	4	4	4	3	4	4	3	4	3	4	4.5	4	2	3	2	4	3	1	2	1	4	1	3		3	2	4		2	1	3	2		2	1	2	128.5	113
Asia	Macau	2		1																																											3	2
Asia	Malaysia								0.5			1		1			2		1			1					2		1		0.5	3		1.5		0.5	1		1								17	14
Asia	Mongolia	2	1	1		1																																									5	3
Asia	Singapore	1		1			1				0.5								1										1		1	1		0.5		1	1										10	10
Asia	South Korea (H)	3	1	3.5	4	3	4	4	4	3	4	4	2	4	3	3	4	4	4	4	4	4	1	4	4	4	3		3	3	4	4		4	2	3	3		3	1	2			2	1	2	126.5	190
Asia	Sri Lanka	4	1	2.5	0.5	1.5			1		1	4	1	3	1	1.5	2		1	0.5	1.5	1			0.5	0.5	1	1	0.5								2		0.5								34	25
Asia	Thailand	3	2	4	3	4	4	3	3	1	4	2		3		2.5	3	2	4	3	3	4	2	4	3	4	3	1	3.5	1	4	3	1	4		3	4		4	1	3	4		2.5			112.5	111
Asia	United Arab Emirates						2		1			3		3	1	2	1		2		0.5	4	2	1			2		1			2		1													25.5	23
Europe	Austria															0.5	2		1													2		0.5		0.5											6.5	4
Europe	Belgium											1		1		0.5	2		0.5		1		1		0.5		1		0.5																		9	5
Europe	Bulgaria		1		0.5	0.5	1	1	0.5	0.5	1			0.5		0.5																					1		0.5								8.5	5
Europe	Czech Republic						2	1	1	0.5	0.5						2		1		1																										9	5
Europe	Denmark	2		1.5	0.5	1.5	1	1		0.5	1.5	2	1	1.5	2	3	2	2	1.5	2	3			0.5		0.5	2		1.5		0.5	2		1.5		0.5	1		0.5			1	1	0.5	0.5	1	44	30
Europe	England	3		1.5	0.5	1.5	3	2	2	1.5	3	4	2	2	1	4	4	2	2.5	2	3.5	4	4	2.5	3.5	4	3	4	3	3	4	4	4	3	3.5	3.5	3	2	3	2	4	1	1	2	2	4	122	81
Europe	Finland						2		1		1		1		0.5		1	2	2	1	2	4		1										1		0.5			0.5			1					21.5	16
Europe	France	2	2	1	1.5	2	4	1	3		2.5	2					4	3	2	2.5	3	1	1			1	3	2	1.5	1	3	3	1	2	1	2	2		1								61	39
Europe	Germany	1	3	0.5	2	2	2	2	1	1.5	2.5	4	3	2	1.5	3	3	3	1.5	2.5	3	4	2	2.5	1.5	3.5	4	4	1.5	1	4	4	4	4	2	3	2		1			2	1	1	0.5	1	97.5	57
Europe	Greece																	1		0.5	0.5																										2	1
Europe	Iceland									0.5						0.5																															1	1
Europe	Ireland																											1		1	0.5																2.5	2
Europe	Latvia																					1		0.5																							1.5	1
Europe	Netherlands											2	1	1	1	2		2		0.5	0.5		3		2	1.5	1	1	1		0.5	1					1		0.5								22.5	12
Europe	Norway							1			1			0.5									1		0.5	0.5						1															5.5	4
Europe	Poland	2		1.5	0.5	1.5	1	2		0.5	1	1		1								1	1		0.5	1																					15.5	8
Europe	Portugal			0.5																																											0.5	1
Europe	Romania	1		0.5		0.5	3		2	0.5	0.5	1	1	0.5		0.5																															11	8
Europe	Scotland									0.5		1		1		1	1						1	0.5	0.5	1						1	1	0.5	0.5	1											11.5	7
Europe	Spain	1		1	2	1	2	3	1	1	4	1				1	2	1	1	0.5			1																								23.5	13
Europe	Sweden	2	3	1	1.5	2	3					4			0.5	1	3		4		1.5	4		3		1.5	3		1			4		2.5			2		1								48.5	30
Europe	Switzerland	4	4	3	2	3.5	2			0.5		2	1			0.5		1		0.5	0.5	2		1		0.5	1				1	2		1													33	20
Oceania	Australia	3	1	1	0.5	1									0.5			1	0.5		0.5						1					1										1		0.5			12.5	9
Oceania	New Zealand	1															1																									1					3	3
Pan Am	Canada	1		1		0.5						1															1		1								2	1	0.5		1.5						10.5	8
Pan Am	Mexico																					1		0.5																							1.5	1
Pan Am	United States					1	1	1	2	0.5		1		0.5			3		1.5	1	1.5	3	2	1	0.5	2	1		0.5		0.5											1		0.5			26	21
Total (44 NOCs)		49	30	41	32	42	53	31	36	22	41	53	23	34	22	37	57	34	46	29	44	50	31	34	26	39	44	21	33	16	37	45	21	30	16	26	34	7	23	8	16	18	6	13	5	13	1368	1185

=== Overaged participants ===
Player	Gender	Date of birth	Singles		Doubles		Mixed	
Player	Gender	Date of birth	Event	Result	Event	Result	Event	Result
(Australia) Maryam Bader	Women	4 May 1971 (aged 51)	50+	3R	45+	2R	50+	3R
(Austria) Reinhard Hechenberger	Men	11 September 1972 (aged 50)	50+	2R	50+	1R	45+	1R
(Belgium) Honoree Rovers	Women	24 May 1966 (aged 56)	55+	1R	55+	2R	50+	3R
(Belgium) Yu Hin Siu	Men	18 November 1972 (aged 50)	50+	1R	45+	2R		
(Cambodia) Muong Setha	Men	30 June 1979 (aged 43)			35+	1R		
(China) Chen Huanqin	Women	20 September 1957 (aged 65)	65+	2R	65+	B	60+	2R
(Chinese Taipei) Chang Yi-yun	Women	5 May 1977 (aged 45)			35+	2R		
(Chinese Taipei) Chen Huang-cheng	Men	25 March 1982 (aged 40)	35+	1R				
(Chinese Taipei) Chuang Tsui-yu	Women	29 September 1964 (aged 58)					50+	1R
(Chinese Taipei) Feng Hung-yun	Men	19 April 1976 (aged 46)	45+	QF	40+	S	45+	B
(Chinese Taipei) Ho Yin-shan	Women	5 July 1956 (aged 66)			55+	1R	60+	3R
(Chinese Taipei) Lu Man-ching	Women	2 September 1976 (aged 46)			40+	QF		
(Chinese Taipei) Shyu Yuh-ling	Women	31 October 1972 (aged 50)			45+	B	50+	B
(Chinese Taipei) Su Yu-pei	Women	10 October 1976 (aged 46)					40+	2R
(Chinese Taipei) Tu Hsiu-hsia	Women	15 November 1962 (aged 60)			55+	2R	55+	2R
(Chinese Taipei) Weng Chiu-ying	Women	29 August 1967 (aged 55)			55+	1R	40+	2R
(Chinese Taipei) Yu Chen-chu	Women	24 February 1960 (aged 62)	60+	2R	60+	QF	55+	2R
(Chinese Taipei) Yu Keng-chi	Men	19 November 1980 (aged 42)			35+	1R	40+	2R
(Denmark) Dorte Steenberg	Women	19 March 1972 (aged 50)			45+	QF	50+	QF
(Denmark) Gitte Mathiasen	Women	22 November 1972 (aged 50)			50+	1R	45+	1R
(Denmark) Hanne Bertelsen	Women	17 August 1964 (aged 58)			50+	1R	55+	G
(Denmark) Helle Mathiasen	Women	17 November 1970 (aged 52)	50+	1R	50+	1R	40+	2R
(Denmark) Janne Vang Nielsen	Women	3 November 1972 (aged 50)	50+	G	45+	QF	50+	QF
(England) Betty Bartlett	Women	14 February 1951 (aged 71)	70+	G	65+	QF	70+	G
(England) Betty Blair	Women	27 August 1966 (aged 56)	55+	2R	55+	B	45+	2R
(England) Bruce Denison	Men	10 November 1962 (aged 60)	55+	1R	55+	2R	55+	2R
(England) Chris Spice	Men	27 November 1975 (aged 47)	40+	2R	45+	3R	45+	QF
(England) Desmond Britto	Men	2 July 1959 (aged 63)	50+	1R	55+	2R		
(England) Elizabeth Austin	Women	22 June 1967 (aged 55)	55+	2R	50+	2R	55+	B
(England) Gene Austin Joyner	Men	17 October 1958 (aged 64)	55+	1R	60+	2R	60+	B
(England) John Kindred	Men	25 March 1956 (aged 66)			65+	1R	60+	2R
(England) Julie Bradbury	Women	22 December 1967 (aged 55)			55+	B	50+	G
(England) Kathleen M. Spillane	Women	26 March 1953 (aged 69)			60+	1R	65+	2R
(England) Kelly Fairey	Women	20 September 1980 (aged 42)			35+	1R	40+	2R
(England) Linda Pearcy	Women	2 May 1962 (aged 60)			55+	QF	60+	3R
(England) Mair Dew	Women	31 October 1958 (aged 64)	55+	1R	60+	1R	60+	2R
(England) Mark King	Men	24 October 1971 (aged 51)			50+	B	45+	3R
(England) Monica Rossil	Women	3 August 1976 (aged 46)	45+	2R	40+	1R	45+	3R
(England) Philip Troke	Men	26 February 1977 (aged 45)	45+	1R	40+	3R	40+	2R
(England) Sara Foster	Women	4 October 1967 (aged 55)			50+	QF	50+	3R
(England) Steven Chung	Men	10 September 1957 (aged 65)	65+	1R	60+	2R		
(Finland) Carl-Johan Nybergh	Men	29 August 1947 (aged 75)	75+	G	70+	B		
(Finland) Emmi Heikkinen	Women	29 April 1977 (aged 45)	45+	2R	45+	2R	40+	3R
(Finland) Jari Eriksson	Men	27 February 1965 (aged 57)			50+	2R	50+	3R
(Finland) Juan Rafols	Men	9 October 1966 (aged 56)	55+	1R	50+	1R		
(France) Aurélie Pérégrina	Women	2 October 1978 (aged 44)	40+	1R	35+	1R	40+	3R
(France) Laurence Renon	Women	13 January 1965 (aged 57)	55+	1R	50+	1R	55+	1R
(France) Mathieu Seignez	Men	22 December 1980 (aged 42)	40+	2R	40+	3R	35+	1R
(France) Philippe Lepage	Men	9 March 1976 (aged 46)	45+	3R	40+	1R		
(France) Sébastien Coto	Men	8 January 1978 (aged 44)	40+	3R	35+	1R	40+	3R
(Germany) Annette Steger	Women	11 August 1962 (aged 60)	60+	2R	55+	1R	60+	2R
(Germany) Dieter Steger	Men	24 March 1962 (aged 60)	60+	2R	55+	1R	60+	2R
(Germany) Frank Naumann	Men	24 April 1966 (aged 56)	50+	1R	55+	1R	55+	2R
(Germany) Heike Vogt	Women	25 February 1981 (aged 41)	40+	2R	35+	2R	40+	2R
(Germany) Jana Felber	Women	1 October 1966 (aged 56)			50+	1R	55+	2R
(Germany) Jessica Willems	Women	12 February 1977 (aged 45)			40+	G	45+	B
(Germany) Klaus Buschbeck	Men	23 February 1962 (aged 60)	60+	2R	55+	2R	60+	QF
(Germany) Stefan Schrader	Men	27 October 1967 (aged 55)	55+	1R	55+	2R	50+	2R
(Hong Kong) Fung Sin Kei	Men	13 June 1981 (aged 41)			40+	2R	35+	3R
(Hong Kong) Hsu Chieh	Men	11 December 1964 (aged 58)			50+	3R		
(Hong Kong) Ng Chor Kwan	Men	8 October 1982 (aged 40)	40+	3R	40+	2R	35+	2R
(Iceland) Drífa Harðardóttir	Women	28 June 1977 (aged 45)			40+	S	45+	G
(India) Abhinand Shetty	Men	9 February 1980 (aged 42)					35+	QF
(India) Bhawna Sharma	Women	7 December 1977 (aged 45)					40+	3R
(India) Davinder Dhillon	Men	22 December 1975 (aged 47)			40+	QF		
(India) Gowramma Veeralinga	Women	21 December 1946 (aged 76)	75+	B	70+	G4	75+	G4
(India) Manjusha Sahasrabudhe	Women	22 September 1961 (aged 61)	60+	B	55+	1R	60+	QF
(India) Maran Thangavelu	Men	6 July 1967 (aged 55)					50+	2R
(India) Rajeev Sharma	Men	20 June 1967 (aged 55)	55+	G	50+	1R		
(India) Sarita Jethwani	Women	7 October 1975 (aged 47)			40+	2R	45+	2R
(India) Shylaja Rangaiah	Women	1 June 1972 (aged 50)			45+	2R		
(India) Sushil Kumar Patet	Men	27 November 1949 (aged 73)			70+	QF	65+	1R
(India) Usha Sharma	Women	13 December 1938 (aged 84)	75+	G3			75+	G3
(India) Varum Sharma	Men	23 August 1981 (aged 41)			35+	3R		
(Indonesia) Alvent Yulianto	Men	11 July 1980 (aged 42)			35+	G		
(Indonesia) Hardawan Panghegar	Men	28 February 1966 (aged 56)			50+	3R		
(Indonesia) Irene Gunarti	Women	5 September 1972 (aged 50)	50+	3R	45+	2R	50+	QF
(Indonesia) Oetomo Maslim	Men	18 September 1957 (aged 65)	65+	S	60+	2R		
(Indonesia) Tjendrawati	Women	5 December 1967 (aged 55)			50+	1R	55+	2R
(Japan) Akira Hori	Men	29 August 1946 (aged 76)	70+	2R	70+	2R	70+	G4
(Japan) Chihiro Hashio	Women	23 July 1982 (aged 40)			35+	2R		
(Japan) Hiromi Imazu	Women	6 March 1957 (aged 65)			60+	B	60+	2R
(Japan) Hosemari Fujimoto	Men	19 May 1975 (aged 47)	45+	G	40+	QF	45+	S
(Japan) Junko Amo	Women	20 February 1950 (aged 72)			65+	2R	70+	B
(Japan) Katsuhiro Suzuki	Men	21 August 1972 (aged 50)			45+	2R		
(Japan) Kazumi Kimura	Women	25 November 1972 (aged 50)	50+	S	40+	2R	50+	2R
(Japan) Kazutoshi Kawaji	Men	5 December 1957 (aged 65)	60+	3R	60+	3R		
(Japan) Makiko Okamoto	Women	2 April 1977 (aged 45)			40+	1R	40+	1R
(Japan) Miyoko Sato	Women	21 May 1956 (aged 66)			65+	QF	60+	3R
(Japan) Miyuki Kasai	Women	12 January 1975 (aged 47)	40+	2R	40+	2R	45+	2R
(Japan) Miyuki Kusanagi	Women	8 May 1977 (aged 45)			45+	QF	40+	2R
(Japan) Natsuki Akimoto	Women	30 October 1982 (aged 40)			35+	2R		
(Japan) Noriko Sanada	Women	1 August 1977 (aged 45)	40+	QF	45+	QF		
(Japan) Seiji Yamamoto	Men	25 October 1949 (aged 73)	70+	B	70+	G	65+	2R
(Japan) Shinjiro Matsuda	Men	28 November 1942 (aged 80)			75+	QF		
(Japan) Yuki Homma	Men	19 July 1982 (aged 40)			35+	S		
(Malaysia) Loh Soon Cheong	Men	25 March 1964 (aged 58)	55+	3R	50+	1R		
(Malaysia) Ong Chong Hwee	Men	30 June 1955 (aged 67)	65+	1R	60+	3R		
(Malaysia) Victor Loh	Men	13 January 1977 (aged 45)	45+	1R	40+	1R		
(Netherlands) Jeannette van der Werff	Women	13 October 1962 (aged 60)	60+	G	55+	2R	60+	S
(Netherlands) Mariëlle van der Woerdt	Women	1 June 1972 (aged 50)	50+	B	45+	B	45+	2R
(Netherlands) Uun Santosa	Men	12 December 1955 (aged 67)	65+	1R	60+	S		
(Norway) Jim Ronny Andersen	Men	4 May 1975 (aged 47)			45+	B	40+	B
(Poland) Adam Kosz	Men	19 August 1979 (aged 43)	40+	3R	35+	2R	40+	2R
(Poland) Andrzej Grzechnik	Men	29 July 1967 (aged 55)	55+	1R	45+	2R	55+	1R
(Poland) Dominika Guzik-Płuchowska	Women	15 November 1979 (aged 43)	40+	QF	40+	QF	35+	QF
(Poland) Magdalena Kołaczkowska	Women	13 September 1980 (aged 42)	40+	1R	35+	1R	40+	1R
(Portugal) José Júnior	Men	15 May 1965 (aged 57)			35+	3R		
(Romania) Aina Mihaela Popa	Women	11 October 1975 (aged 47)	45+	2R	40+	2R	45+	2R
(Scotland) Frazer Mcculloch	Men	21 December 1971 (aged 51)	50+	3R	45+	QF		
(Scotland) Lynne Campbell	Women	24 April 1973 (aged 49)			40+	QF	45+	2R
(Singapore) Foo Kon Fai	Men	1 September 1957 (aged 65)	65+	G	60+	1R	65+	B
(Singapore) Victor Sim	Men	1 July 1955 (aged 67)			65+	G	60+	3R
(Singapore) Vivek Chotteyandamada	Men	16 May 1981 (aged 41)	40+	1R	35+	3R	40+	3R
(South Africa) Johan Croukamp	Men	25 November 1948 (aged 74)	70+	QF	70+	B	55+	1R
(South Korea) An Eun-hee	Women	2 February 1979 (aged 43)			35+	1R		
(South Korea) Cheon Man-seok	Men	20 February 1972 (aged 50)	50+	1R			45+	2R
(South Korea) Choi Jae-won	Men	23 October 1979 (aged 43)			35+	2R	40+	1R
(South Korea) Choi Moon-suk	Women	5 March 1968 (aged 54)					35+	2R
(South Korea) Choi Non-i	Women	28 March 1974 (aged 48)			35+	1R		
(South Korea) Jeong Gyeong-ran	Women	19 August 1976 (aged 46)	40+	1R				
(South Korea) Kang Bok-ja	Women	7 November 1955 (aged 67)					60+	2R
(South Korea) Kang Hyun-ju	Women	1 September 1973 (aged 49)			40+	2R		
(South Korea) Kim Byeong-kwan	Men	22 July 1977 (aged 45)			40+	2R		
(South Korea) Kim Eun-sil	Women	3 January 1973 (aged 49)			35+	1R		
(South Korea) Kim Hyun-mi	Women	28 August 1974 (aged 48)			35+	1R		
(South Korea) Kim Jae-min	Men	3 October 1972 (aged 50)			35+	2R		
(South Korea) Kim Mag-rae	Women	7 July 1952 (aged 70)					65+	1R
(South Korea) Kim Seong-ok	Women	21 October 1970 (aged 52)					45+	2R
(South Korea) Kim Suk	Men	29 December 1976 (aged 46)			40+	2R		
(South Korea) Kim Won-sik	Men	17 August 1972 (aged 50)			45+	2R		
(South Korea) Kim Yong-gyu	Men	17 October 1979 (aged 43)	35+	1R				
(South Korea) Kim Young-sam	Men	27 August 1970 (aged 52)					35+	2R
(South Korea) Kim Young-seon	Men	26 November 1969 (aged 53)	45+	1R				
(South Korea) Kim Young-sook	Women	25 November 1953 (aged 69)			60+	1R		
(South Korea) King Young-chu	Men	20 July 1971 (aged 51)			35+	2R		
(South Korea) Kwon Young-hyun	Men	5 February 1941 (aged 81)			75+	G3		
(South Korea) Kyoung-lan Hemingway	Women	8 September 1966 (aged 56)			50+	1R		
(South Korea) Lee Eun-gang	Women	18 February 1962 (aged 60)			55+	1R		
(South Korea) Lee Hyun-jung	Women	29 January 1980 (aged 42)			35+	1R		
(South Korea) Lee Jong-kuk	Men	7 June 1967 (aged 55)			50+	1R		
(South Korea) Lee Mi-jung	Women	19 January 1972 (aged 50)			40+	2R		
(South Korea) Lee Mi-young	Women	15 February 1967 (aged 55)			45+	1R		
(South Korea) Lee Pan-soon	Women	15 June 1942 (aged 80)					75+	QF
(South Korea) Lee Soon-ae	Women	30 August 1962 (aged 60)			55+	1R		
(South Korea) Moon Yeong-hwa	Men	14 October 1982 (aged 40)			35+	1R	35+	2R
(South Korea) Oh Jong-hun	Men	23 November 1968 (aged 54)			45+	2R		
(South Korea) Park Myung-ja	Women	15 February 1967 (aged 55)			50+	2R		
(South Korea) Park Sang-yun	Men	24 December 1982 (aged 40)			35+	1R		
(South Korea) Park Seung-hun	Men	29 January 1972 (aged 50)			45+	2R		
(South Korea) Park Yong-bok	Men	5 September 1968 (aged 54)	35+	2R				
(South Korea) Pank Yun-gyu	Men	21 February 1966 (aged 56)					50+	1R
(South Korea) Pyo Yeong-dal	Men	30 August 1966 (aged 56)			45+	2R		
(South Korea) Ryu Sang-nam	Men	28 February 1971 (aged 51)			45+	2R		
(South Korea) Seo Jo-yeong	Women	24 July 1977 (aged 45)			35+	1R		
(South Korea) Seok Wang-chang	Men	17 September 1969 (aged 53)					45+	1R
(South Korea) Shin Dong-soo	Men	9 February 1938 (aged 84)			75+	G3	75+	QF
(South Korea) Son Jung-hee	Women	1 June 1970 (aged 52)					40+	1R
(South Korea) Won Geun-ho	Women	30 April 1947 (aged 75)					70+	G4
(South Korea) Yoon Chae-ha	Women	29 May 1980 (aged 42)			35+	1R		
(South Korea) You Chun-hee	Women	1 July 1961 (aged 61)					55+	1R
(Spain) Álvaro Rangil	Men	9 November 1970 (aged 52)	50+	1R	50+	2R	40+	1R
(Spain) Beatriz Martín	Women	15 July 1972 (aged 50)	50+	2R	50+	1R	45+	1R
(Spain) David Hernansanz	Men	30 August 1982 (aged 40)	40+	2R	35+	2R	40+	2R
(Spain) Esther Segarra	Women	13 July 1967 (aged 55)	55+	1R	40+	1R	40+	2R
(Spain) Luis Antonio Morcillo	Men	18 June 1970 (aged 52)	50+	3R	50+	2R	40+	1R
(Spain) Sandra del Busto	Women	16 April 1981 (aged 41)	40+	1R	35+	1R	40+	1R
(Spain) Santiago Martínez	Men	31 March 1974 (aged 48)	45+	1R	40+	2R	45+	2R
(Spain) Vanessa Serrano	Women	31 March 1974 (aged 48)	40+	QF	35+	1R	40+	1R
(Sri Lanka) Lakshmi Punchihewa	Women	29 June 1958 (aged 64)	60+	2R	55+	1R	40+	1R
(Sri Lanka) Rohan Fernando	Men	29 November 1952 (aged 70)	60+	2R	60+	2R		
(Sri Lanka) Sahan Pradeep	Men	11 April 1972 (aged 50)			45+	2R	50+	1R
(Sweden) Bo Christer Bertilson	Men	22 August 1953 (aged 69)	60+	1R	65+	QF		
(Sweden) Fredrik Ingemansson	Men	5 October 1964 (aged 58)	45+	1R	55+	3R	50+	2R
(Sweden) Jan-Eric Antonsson	Men	9 September 1961 (aged 61)	60+	G	60+	G	55+	G
(Sweden) Karl Svensson	Men	18 July 1970 (aged 52)	40+	1R	50+	1R	50+	2R
(Sweden) Krister Drake	Men	5 November 1969 (aged 53)	45+	1R	50+	1R		
(Sweden) Markus Thor	Men	14 September 1971 (aged 51)	45+	1R	50+	3R		
(Sweden) Mattias Lundqvist	Men	13 November 1970 (aged 52)	50+	1R	50+	3R	45+	1R
(Sweden) Michel Bachtiar	Men	20 December 1965 (aged 57)	45+	2R	55+	QF	35+	2R
(Sweden) Mikael Tornemo	Men	2 November 1970 (aged 52)	40+	1R	50+	1R		
(Sweden) Pierre Eriksson	Men	26 May 1965 (aged 57)	40+	1R	55+	QF		
(Switzerland) Franziska Striebel	Women	19 November 1973 (aged 49)	45+	2R	40+	2R	45+	1R
(Switzerland) Jan Fröhlich	Men	15 March 1980 (aged 42)	40+	3R	35+	2R		
(Switzerland) Jonas Grape	Men	16 November 1976 (aged 46)	45+	2R	35+	1R		
(Switzerland) Paul Dodd	Men	4 May 1956 (aged 66)	65+	1R	65+	2R	60+	2R
(Switzerland) Thomas Bless	Men	10 November 1982 (aged 40)	40+	1R	35+	2R	35+	1R
(Thailand) Apirat Siwapornpitak	Men	22 May 1942 (aged 80)	75+	1R	75+	B		
(Thailand) Atipong Kitjanon	Men	8 June 1979 (aged 43)					35+	QF
(Thailand) Boonyanuch Tanhammaroj	Women	4 April 1972 (aged 50)			50+	QF	45+	1R
(Thailand) Chatree Jarutawai	Men	21 March 1959 (aged 63)	50+	1R	60+	2R	50+	2R
(Thailand) Jidapa Thongpanangpan	Women	30 January 1966 (aged 56)	55+	2R	50+	1R		
(Thailand) Juan Muanwong	Women	9 April 1968 (aged 54)	50+	2R	35+	1R		
(Thailand) Juthatip Banjongsilp	Women	19 February 1960 (aged 62)			60+	B	55+	2R
(Thailand) Mongkol Gumlaitong	Men	11 January 1962 (aged 60)			55+	QF	60+	1R
(Thailand) Naruenart Chuaymak	Men	11 October 1977 (aged 45)	45+	B	45+	S	40+	S
(Thailand) Poonsul Wattananan	Women	1 September 1956 (aged 66)					60+	2R
(Thailand) Poonyaporn Thongmueang	Women	28 February 1961 (aged 61)	60+	QF	55+	2R		
(Thailand) Rungsan Thipsotikul	Men	1 January 1980 (aged 43)			35+	B		
(Thailand) Seri Chintanaseri	Men	21 April 1942 (aged 80)	75+	QF	75+	QF		
(Thailand) Somsak Poebaikul	Men	13 December 1957 (aged 65)			60+	2R	65+	QF
(Thailand) Suwanna Jarutawai	Women	2 November 1961 (aged 61)					50+	2R
(Thailand) Veeranuch Trairatnopas	Women	30 October 1966 (aged 56)	55+	1R	50+	1R		
(Thailand) Vilailak Sattayapun	Women	21 July 1965 (aged 57)			50+	QF		
(United Arab Emirates) Pavan Kumar K. V.	Men	29 January 1966 (aged 56)			50+	2R		
(United Arab Emirates) Vidya Pahlaj Manghnani	Women	9 March 1965 (aged 57)	55+	1R			50+	1R
(United States) Ajit Umrani	Men	17 May 1979 (aged 43)			40+	3R	35+	3R
(United States) Anil Nair	Men	16 August 1969 (aged 53)			40+	3R		
(United States) Anshuman Mishra	Men	5 July 1975 (aged 47)	45+	2R	40+	3R		
(United States) Deepinder Grewal	Men	8 January 1967 (aged 55)	55+	1R	50+	1R	55+	1R
(United States) Lingxiang Li	Women	29 October 1962 (aged 60)			50+	2R	55+	1R

== Medal summary ==
=== Medal standings ===
* Host nation (South Korea)

2023 BWF World Senior Championships medal table
Rank	Nation	Gold	Silver	Bronze	Total
1	England	7.5	10	9.5	27
2	Japan	7	10	16	33
3	Thailand	4	5	9.5	18.5
4	Denmark	4	0.5	8.5	13
5	Indonesia	3.5	1.5	2	7
6	Netherlands	2.5	1.5	2	6
7	Sweden	2	0	5.5	7.5
8	South Korea*	2	0	1	3
9	Germany	1.5	3.5	2	7
10	Hong Kong	1.5	1	0	2.5
11	Malaysia	1.5	0	1.5	3
12	Singapore	1.5	0	1	2.5
13	Chinese Taipei	1	6	8.5	15.5
14	India	1	2	8	11
15	Ireland	1	0	1	2
16	Finland	1	0	0.5	1.5
17	Iceland	1	0	0	1
18	Sri Lanka	0.5	1	1	2.5
19	United States	0.5	0.5	0.5	1.5
20	China	0.5	0	1.5	2
21	Scotland	0	1	2	3
22	New Zealand	0	1	1	2
23	Canada	0	0.5	2	2.5
24	Norway	0	0	1.5	1.5
25	Romania	0	0	1	1
25	Switzerland	0	0	1	1
27	Austria	0	0	0.5	0.5
27	South Africa	0	0	0.5	0.5
Totals (28 entries)		45	45	89	179

=== Medalists ===
Event	Gold	Silver	Bronze
35+
Men's singles	(Japan) Makoto Aoyama	(New Zealand) Joe Wu	(Thailand) Tawan Huansuriya
Men's singles	(Japan) Makoto Aoyama	(New Zealand) Joe Wu	(Canada) Derrick Ng
Women's singles	(Japan) Mana Yatabe	(Thailand) Benjaporn Thienrajkij	(Japan) Azusa Soga
Women's singles	(Japan) Mana Yatabe	(Thailand) Benjaporn Thienrajkij	(Sri Lanka) Nadeesha Gayanthi
Men's doubles	(Indonesia) Alvent Yulianto (Indonesia) Fran Kurniawan	(Japan) Yuki Homma (Japan) Masakazu Mouri	(Thailand) Santiphap Kaweenanthawong (Thailand) Rungsan Thipsotikul
Men's doubles	(Indonesia) Alvent Yulianto (Indonesia) Fran Kurniawan	(Japan) Yuki Homma (Japan) Masakazu Mouri	(Japan) Takahito Honbu (Japan) Futoshi Ide
Women's doubles	(Thailand) Molthila Kijanon (Thailand) Vacharaporn Munkit	(Japan) Kanako Jigami (Japan) Yuki Taruno	(Thailand) Wasamon Chokuthaikul (Thailand) Suttapa Ekworrathien
Women's doubles	(Thailand) Molthila Kijanon (Thailand) Vacharaporn Munkit	(Japan) Kanako Jigami (Japan) Yuki Taruno	(Japan) Sakie Sakai (Japan) Azusa Soga
Mixed doubles	(Thailand) Nawut Thanathiratham (Thailand) Vacharaporn Munkit	(Canada) Derrick Ng (United States) Pai Hsiao-ma	(Thailand) Chanyut Suntiparaphop (Thailand) Benjaporn Thienrajkij
Mixed doubles	(Thailand) Nawut Thanathiratham (Thailand) Vacharaporn Munkit	(Canada) Derrick Ng (United States) Pai Hsiao-ma	(India) Mohamed Rehan Raju (India) Anees Kowsar Jamaludeen
40+
Men's singles	(Chinese Taipei) Yang Chia-hao	(Japan) Daichi Hanamoto	(Japan) Kazutaka Ninomiya
Men's singles	(Chinese Taipei) Yang Chia-hao	(Japan) Daichi Hanamoto	(Chinese Taipei) Wang Li-wei
Women's singles	(Denmark) Gry Uhrenholt Hermansen	(Thailand) Kamonwan Winyoowijak	(Chinese Taipei) Cheng Wen-hsing
Women's singles	(Denmark) Gry Uhrenholt Hermansen	(Thailand) Kamonwan Winyoowijak	(Japan) Sayaka Ueyama
Men's doubles	(Thailand) Boonsak Ponsana (Thailand) Jakrapan Thanathiratham	(Chinese Taipei) Feng Hung-yun (Chinese Taipei) Yang Chia-hao	(Romania) Robert Ciobotaru (Romania) Daniel Cojocaru
Men's doubles	(Thailand) Boonsak Ponsana (Thailand) Jakrapan Thanathiratham	(Chinese Taipei) Feng Hung-yun (Chinese Taipei) Yang Chia-hao	(India) J. B. S. Vidyadhar (India) Sanave Thomas
Women's doubles	(Iceland) Drífa Harðardóttir (Denmark) Gry Uhrenholt Hermansen	(Germany) Tiina Kähler (Germany) Jessica Willems	(Chinese Taipei) Cheng Wen-hsing (United States) Katy Li
Women's doubles	(Iceland) Drífa Harðardóttir (Denmark) Gry Uhrenholt Hermansen	(Germany) Tiina Kähler (Germany) Jessica Willems	(India) Nupura Gadgil (India) Pooja Patil
Mixed doubles	(Thailand) Jakrapan Thanathiratham (Thailand) Kamonwan Winyoowijak	(Thailand) Naruenart Chuaymak (Thailand) Thanyalak Dechprarom	(Norway) Jim Ronny Andersen (Norway) Helene Abusdal
Mixed doubles	(Thailand) Jakrapan Thanathiratham (Thailand) Kamonwan Winyoowijak	(Thailand) Naruenart Chuaymak (Thailand) Thanyalak Dechprarom	(India) Sunil Gladson Varadaraj (India) Pooja Patil
45+
Men's singles	(Japan) Hosemari Fujimoto	(India) C. M. Shashidhar	(Thailand) Naruenart Chuaymak
Men's singles	(Japan) Hosemari Fujimoto	(India) C. M. Shashidhar	(Switzerland) Conrad Hückstädt
Women's singles	(Netherlands) Georgy Trouerbach	(Sri Lanka) Chandrika de Silva	(Japan) Mayumi Fukasawa
Women's singles	(Netherlands) Georgy Trouerbach	(Sri Lanka) Chandrika de Silva	(England) Rebecca Pantaney
Men's doubles	(United States) Tony Gunawan (Indonesia) Tri Kusharjanto	(Thailand) Naruenart Chuaymak (Thailand) Thaweesak Koetsriphan	(Thailand) Visava Pimsamarn (Thailand) Nuttawut Sroidokson
Men's doubles	(United States) Tony Gunawan (Indonesia) Tri Kusharjanto	(Thailand) Naruenart Chuaymak (Thailand) Thaweesak Koetsriphan	(Norway) Jim Ronny Andersen (Denmark) Jesper Thomsen
Women's doubles	(Sri Lanka) Chandrika de Silva (Germany) Claudia Vogelgsang	(Japan) Maki Jin (Japan) Mikiko Shimada	(Netherlands) Georgy Trouerbach (Netherlands) Mariëlle van der Woerdt
Women's doubles	(Sri Lanka) Chandrika de Silva (Germany) Claudia Vogelgsang	(Japan) Maki Jin (Japan) Mikiko Shimada	(Chinese Taipei) Kao Shin-li (Chinese Taipei) Shyu Yuh-ling
Mixed doubles	(Denmark) Jesper Thomsen (Iceland) Drífa Harðardóttir	(Japan) Hosemari Fujimoto (Japan) Tomoko Hinoishi	(Chinese Taipei) Feng Hung-yun (Chinese Taipei) Kao Shin-li
Mixed doubles	(Denmark) Jesper Thomsen (Iceland) Drífa Harðardóttir	(Japan) Hosemari Fujimoto (Japan) Tomoko Hinoishi	(Germany) Björn Wippich (Germany) Jessica Willems
50+
Men's singles	(Indonesia) Marleve Mainaky	(England) Carl Jennings	(England) Simon Gilhooly
Men's singles	(Indonesia) Marleve Mainaky	(England) Carl Jennings	(Denmark) Carsten Loesch
Women's singles	(Denmark) Janne Vang Nielsen	(Japan) Kazumi Kimura	(Japan) Reiko Nakamura
Women's singles	(Denmark) Janne Vang Nielsen	(Japan) Kazumi Kimura	(Netherlands) Mariëlle van der Woerdt
Men's doubles	(Indonesia) Heryanto Arbi (Indonesia) Marleve Mainaky	(Thailand) Chatchai Boonmee (Thailand) Wittaya Panomchai	(England) Carl Jennings (England) Mark King
Men's doubles	(Indonesia) Heryanto Arbi (Indonesia) Marleve Mainaky	(Thailand) Chatchai Boonmee (Thailand) Wittaya Panomchai	(Japan) Kei Hamaji (Japan) Shinichi Wakui
Women's doubles	(Japan) Sayuri Imai (Japan) Junko Numata	(Japan) Yaeko Kinoshita (Japan) Minako Sakazaki	(Japan) Reiko Nakamura (Japan) Makiko Tsujita
Women's doubles	(Japan) Sayuri Imai (Japan) Junko Numata	(Japan) Yaeko Kinoshita (Japan) Minako Sakazaki	(Japan) Naoko Onuma (Japan) Yoko Takashina
Mixed doubles	(Denmark) Carsten Loesch (England) Julie Bradbury	(England) Carl Jennings (England) Caroline Hale	(Denmark) Morten Aarup (Denmark) Lene Struwe Andersen
Mixed doubles	(Denmark) Carsten Loesch (England) Julie Bradbury	(England) Carl Jennings (England) Caroline Hale	(Chinese Taipei) Huang Chuan-chen (Chinese Taipei) Shyu Yuh-ling
55+
Men's singles	(India) Rajeev Sharma	(Chinese Taipei) Liu En-hung	(Sweden) Stefan Grahn
Men's singles	(India) Rajeev Sharma	(Chinese Taipei) Liu En-hung	(Indonesia) Joko Suprianto
Women's singles	(Hong Kong) Chan Oi Ni	(Japan) Kumiko Kushiyama	(India) Sangeeta Rajgopalan
Women's singles	(Hong Kong) Chan Oi Ni	(Japan) Kumiko Kushiyama	(Chinese Taipei) Feng Mei-ying
Men's doubles	(England) Jon Austin (England) Rajeev Bagga	(Chinese Taipei) Liu En-hung (Chinese Taipei) Tu Tung-sheng	(Thailand) Karoon Kasayapanan (Thailand) Surachai Makkasasithorn
Men's doubles	(England) Jon Austin (England) Rajeev Bagga	(Chinese Taipei) Liu En-hung (Chinese Taipei) Tu Tung-sheng	(Denmark) Henrik Lykke (Scotland) Alan McMillan
Women's doubles	(South Korea) Chung Gil-soon (South Korea) Chung So-young	(Germany) Tanja Eberl (Netherlands) Elke Nijsse-Drews	(England) Julie Bradbury (England) Debora Miller
Women's doubles	(South Korea) Chung Gil-soon (South Korea) Chung So-young	(Germany) Tanja Eberl (Netherlands) Elke Nijsse-Drews	(England) Betty Blair (Scotland) Aileen Travers
Mixed doubles	(Sweden) Jan-Eric Antonsson (Denmark) Hanne Bertelsen	(Chinese Taipei) Chou Tsai-shen (Chinese Taipei) Wang Ching-hui	(England) Jon Austin (England) Debora Miller
Mixed doubles	(Sweden) Jan-Eric Antonsson (Denmark) Hanne Bertelsen	(Chinese Taipei) Chou Tsai-shen (Chinese Taipei) Wang Ching-hui	(England) Rajeev Bagga (England) Elizabeth Austin
60+
Men's singles	(Sweden) Jan-Eric Antonsson	(Chinese Taipei) Chang Wen-sung	(Denmark) Jan Bertram Petersen
Men's singles	(Sweden) Jan-Eric Antonsson	(Chinese Taipei) Chang Wen-sung	(Chinese Taipei) Wang Shun-chen
Women's singles	(Netherlands) Jeannette van der Werff	(Hong Kong) Zhou Xin	(Republic of Ireland) Sian Williams
Women's singles	(Netherlands) Jeannette van der Werff	(Hong Kong) Zhou Xin	(India) Manjusha Sahasrabudhe
Men's doubles	(Sweden) Jan-Eric Antonsson (Denmark) Jan Bertram Petersen	(Netherlands) Uun Santosa (Indonesia) Simbarsono Sutanto	(Indonesia) Bobby Ertanto (Indonesia) Effendy Widjaja
Men's doubles	(Sweden) Jan-Eric Antonsson (Denmark) Jan Bertram Petersen	(Netherlands) Uun Santosa (Indonesia) Simbarsono Sutanto	(Sweden) Per Areskär (Denmark) Per Juul
Women's doubles	(Republic of Ireland) Pamela Peard (Republic of Ireland) Sian Williams	(England) Launa Eyles (England) Kerry Mullen	(Thailand) Juthatip Banjongsilp (Thailand) Khanittha Maensamut
Women's doubles	(Republic of Ireland) Pamela Peard (Republic of Ireland) Sian Williams	(England) Launa Eyles (England) Kerry Mullen	(Japan) Hiromi Imazu (Japan) Kayoko Ueda
Mixed doubles	(China) Xiong Guobao (Hong Kong) Zhou Xin	(Denmark) Jan Bertram Petersen (Netherlands) Jeannette van der Werff	(Chinese Taipei) Wang Shun-chen (Chinese Taipei) Shyu Shuang-yuan
Mixed doubles	(China) Xiong Guobao (Hong Kong) Zhou Xin	(Denmark) Jan Bertram Petersen (Netherlands) Jeannette van der Werff	(England) Gene Austin Joyner (England) Launa Eyles
65+
Men's singles	(Singapore) Foo Kon Fai	(Indonesia) Oetomo Maslim	(Malaysia) Ong Then Lin
Men's singles	(Singapore) Foo Kon Fai	(Indonesia) Oetomo Maslim	(Sweden) Johan Widoff
Women's singles	(Germany) Heidi Bender	(England) Christine Crossley	(Scotland) Christine Black
Women's singles	(Germany) Heidi Bender	(England) Christine Crossley	(Japan) Kuniko Yamamoto
Men's doubles	(Malaysia) Ong Then Lin (Singapore) Victor Sim	(Chinese Taipei) Yang Cheng-tsung (Chinese Taipei) Yang Chung-shun	(Austria) Tariq Farooq (Denmark) Karsten Meier
Men's doubles	(Malaysia) Ong Then Lin (Singapore) Victor Sim	(Chinese Taipei) Yang Cheng-tsung (Chinese Taipei) Yang Chung-shun	(Sweden) Cheddi Liljeström (Sweden) Björn Wigardt
Women's doubles	(Japan) Yukiko Motegi (Japan) Kuniko Yamamoto	(England) Anne C. Bridge (England) Christine Crossley	(China) Chen Huanqin (China) Yu Xiaomin
Women's doubles	(Japan) Yukiko Motegi (Japan) Kuniko Yamamoto	(England) Anne C. Bridge (England) Christine Crossley	(Germany) Heidi Bender (Germany) Marie-Luise Schulta-Jansen
Mixed doubles	(South Korea) Lee Eun-gu (South Korea) Yu Yeon	(Scotland) Dan Travers (Scotland) Christine Black	(Malaysia) Ong Then Lin (China) Yu Xiaomin
Mixed doubles	(South Korea) Lee Eun-gu (South Korea) Yu Yeon	(Scotland) Dan Travers (Scotland) Christine Black	(Singapore) Foo Kon Fai (Singapore) Bessie Ong
70+
Men's singles	(Malaysia) Bruni Garip	(Japan) Nobuyuki Aoyama	(Sweden) Stefan Ohrås
Men's singles	(Malaysia) Bruni Garip	(Japan) Nobuyuki Aoyama	(Japan) Seiji Yamamoto
Women's singles	(England) Betty Bartlett	(India) Jessie Philip	(India) Susy V. John
Women's singles	(England) Betty Bartlett	(India) Jessie Philip	(Canada) Siew Har Hong
Men's doubles	(Japan) Nobuyuki Aoyama (Japan) Seiji Yamamoto	(England) Peter Emptage (England) Graham Holt	(South Africa) Johan Croukamp (Finland) Carl-Johan Nybergh
Men's doubles	(Japan) Nobuyuki Aoyama (Japan) Seiji Yamamoto	(England) Peter Emptage (England) Graham Holt	(Sweden) Curt Ingedahl (Sweden) Stefan Ohrås
Women's doubles	(Japan) Haruko Asakoshi (Japan) Kinuko Manake	(England) Cathy Alexander (England) Sylvia Gill	(England) Anna Bowskill (England) Sylvia Penn
Women's doubles	(Japan) Haruko Asakoshi (Japan) Kinuko Manake	(England) Cathy Alexander (England) Sylvia Gill	(South Korea) Jeong Jung-hee (South Korea) Park Bok-hee
Mixed doubles	(England) Peter Emptage (England) Betty Bartlett	(England) Graham Michael Robinson (England) Cathy Alexander	(Japan) Nobuyuki Aoyama (Japan) Junko Amo
Mixed doubles	(England) Peter Emptage (England) Betty Bartlett	(England) Graham Michael Robinson (England) Cathy Alexander	(Japan) Hirohisa Toshijima (Japan) Haruko Asakoshi
75+
Men's singles	(Finland) Carl-Johan Nybergh	(England) Jim Garrett	(New Zealand) Agus Husin
Men's singles	(Finland) Carl-Johan Nybergh	(England) Jim Garrett	(Denmark) Per Dabelsteen
Women's singles	(England) Mary Jenner	(Germany) Elvira Richter	(India) Gowramma Veeralinga
Women's singles	(England) Mary Jenner	(Germany) Elvira Richter	(Denmark) Irene Sterlie
Men's doubles	(England) Michael John Cox (England) Jim Garrett	(Japan) Masaki Furuhashi (Japan) Hiroshi Yoshida	(Thailand) Pramot Khaosamang (Thailand) Apirat Siwapornpitak
Men's doubles	(England) Michael John Cox (England) Jim Garrett	(Japan) Masaki Furuhashi (Japan) Hiroshi Yoshida	(Denmark) Per Dabelsteen (Thailand) Pirachitra Surakkhaka
Women's doubles	(England) Linda Coombes (England) Jan Hewett	(Germany) Elvira Richter (Denmark) Irene Sterlie	(Japan) Hiromi Ayama (Japan) Setsuko Yano
Mixed doubles	(England) Jim Garrett (England) Mary Jenner	(England) Ian Brothers (England) Jan Hewett	(Denmark) Per Dabelsteen (Denmark) Irene Sterlie
Mixed doubles	(England) Jim Garrett (England) Mary Jenner	(England) Ian Brothers (England) Jan Hewett	(England) Kenneth Tantum (England) Sue Awcock
