= 2023 BWF World Senior Championships – 65+ =

Tournament details
- Dates: 11 September 2023 – 17 September 2023
- Edition: 11
- Level: International
- Competitors: 124 from 22 nations
- Venue: Hwasan Indoor Stadium; Jeonju Indoor Badminton Hall
- Location: Jeonju, South Korea

Champions
- Men's singles: (Singapore) Foo Kon Fai
- Women's singles: (Germany) Heidi Bender
- Men's doubles: (Malaysia) Ong Then Lin (Singapore) Victor Sim
- Women's doubles: (Japan) Yukiko Motegi (Japan) Kuniko Yamamoto
- Mixed doubles: (South Korea) Lee Eun-gu (South Korea) Yu Yeon

These are the results of 2023 BWF World Senior Championships' 65+ events.

== Competition schedule ==
Match was played as scheduled below.

#R	Preliminary rounds	QF	Quarter-finals	SF	Semi-finals	F	Finals

H	Hwasan Indoor Stadium	J	Jeonju Indoor Badminton Hall

Date	11 Sep		12 Sep		13 Sep		14 Sep		15 Sep	16 Sep	17 Sep
Venue	H	J	H	J	H	J	H	J	H	H	H
Men's singles		1R	2R		3R				QF	SF	F
Women's singles			1R		2R				QF	SF	F
Men's doubles		1R						2R	QF	SF	F
Women's doubles		1R						2R	QF	SF	F
Mixed doubles		1R			2R				QF	SF	F

== Medal summary ==
=== Medal standings ===
* Host nation (South Korea)

2023 BWF World Senior Championships medal table
Rank	Nation	Gold	Silver	Bronze	Total
1	Singapore	1.5	0	1	2.5
2	Germany	1	0	1	2
2	Japan	1	0	1	2
4	South Korea*	1	0	0	1
5	Malaysia	0.5	0	1.5	2
6	England	0	2	0	2
7	Scotland	0	1	1	2
8	Chinese Taipei	0	1	0	1
8	Indonesia	0	1	0	1
10	Sweden	0	0	2	2
11	China	0	0	1.5	1.5
12	Austria	0	0	0.5	0.5
12	Denmark	0	0	0.5	0.5
Totals (13 entries)		5	5	10	20

=== Medalists ===
Event	Gold	Silver	Bronze
Men's singles	(Singapore) Foo Kon Fai	(Indonesia) Oetomo Maslim	(Malaysia) Ong Then Lin
Men's singles	(Singapore) Foo Kon Fai	(Indonesia) Oetomo Maslim	(Sweden) Johan Widoff
Women's singles	(Germany) Heidi Bender	(England) Christine Crossley	(Scotland) Christine Black
Women's singles	(Germany) Heidi Bender	(England) Christine Crossley	(Japan) Kuniko Yamamoto
Men's doubles	(Malaysia) Ong Then Lin (Singapore) Victor Sim	(Chinese Taipei) Yang Cheng-tsung (Chinese Taipei) Yang Chung-shun	(Austria) Tariq Farooq (Denmark) Karsten Meier
Men's doubles	(Malaysia) Ong Then Lin (Singapore) Victor Sim	(Chinese Taipei) Yang Cheng-tsung (Chinese Taipei) Yang Chung-shun	(Sweden) Cheddi Liljeström (Sweden) Björn Wigardt
Women's doubles	(Japan) Yukiko Motegi (Japan) Kuniko Yamamoto	(England) Anne C. Bridge (England) Christine Crossley	(China) Chen Huanqin (China) Yu Xiaomin
Women's doubles	(Japan) Yukiko Motegi (Japan) Kuniko Yamamoto	(England) Anne C. Bridge (England) Christine Crossley	(Germany) Heidi Bender (Germany) Marie-Luise Schulta-Jansen
Mixed doubles	(South Korea) Lee Eun-gu (South Korea) Yu Yeon	(Scotland) Dan Travers (Scotland) Christine Black	(Malaysia) Ong Then Lin (China) Yu Xiaomin
Mixed doubles	(South Korea) Lee Eun-gu (South Korea) Yu Yeon	(Scotland) Dan Travers (Scotland) Christine Black	(Singapore) Foo Kon Fai (Singapore) Bessie Ong

== Men's singles ==
=== Seeds ===
1. (Denmark) Karsten Meier (third round)
2. (Sweden) Cheddi Liljeström (second round)
3. (Scotland) Dan Travers (second round)
4. (Sweden) Bengt Åberg (third round)
5. (Austria) Tariq Farooq (third round)
6. (England) George Joseph (second round)
7. (Japan) Toshio Kawaguchi (second round)
8. (France) Kaneson Sethuraman (second round)

=== Finals ===
Semi-finals
(Malaysia) Ong Then Lin	23	9	19
(Singapore) Foo Kon Fai	21	21	21
(Sweden) Johan Widoff	17	21	15
(Indonesia) Oetomo Maslim	21	19	21

Final
(Singapore) Foo Kon Fai	21	21
(Indonesia) Oetomo Maslim	8	14

=== Top half ===
==== Section 1 ====
First round
(Sweden) B Wigardt	22	18	17
(England) P Jeffreys	20	21	21
(Thailand) V Kimsunthorn	21	21
(France) P Jumeaux	14	16
(Malaysia) Ong T L	21	21
(Netherlands) U Santosa	14	15

Second round
1	(Denmark) K Meier	21	21
(South Korea) Yang S-j	3	6
(India) A Dhand	21	15	21
(England) P Jeffreys	9	21	18
5/8	(Austria) T Farooq	21	21
(Thailand) V Kimsunthorn	9	16
(Germany) D Frick	7	14
(Malaysia) Ong T L	21	21

Third round
1	(Denmark) K Meier	17	17
(India) A Dhand	21	21
5/8	(Austria) T Farooq	21	11	18
(Malaysia) Ong T L	17	21	21

Quarter-finals
(India) A Dhand	14	10
(Malaysia) Ong T L	21	21

==== Section 2 ====
First round
(England) L P Loo	22	21
(Germany) J Molodet	20	18
(South Korea) Kim S-b	4	12
(Thailand) C Suvanich	21	21
(Malaysia) Ong C H	8	5
(Singapore) Foo K F	21	21
(Bahrain) M Baig	21	21
(Switzerland) R Bützer	8	9

Second round
3/4	(Sweden) B Åberg	19	21	21
(England) L P Loo	21	15	6
(United Arab Emirates) L Kunju	21	21	21
(Thailand) C Suvanich	23	16	10
5/8	(Japan) T Kawaguchi	13	5
(Singapore) Foo K F	21	21
(France) M Chanteur	17	21	18
(Bahrain) M Baig	21	14	21

Third round
3/4	(Sweden) B Åberg	21	17	17
(United Arab Emirates) L Kunju	18	21	21
(Singapore) Foo K F	21	21
(Bahrain) M Baig	3	6

Quarter-finals
(United Arab Emirates) L Kunju	12	12
(Singapore) Foo K F	21	21

=== Bottom half ===
==== Section 3 ====
First round
(Germany) R Viermann	w	/	o
(Thailand) P Klinkhachorn
(Sweden) J Widoff	21	21
(South Korea) Kim J-c	11	3
(India) S Sharma	21	21
(Austria) I Begg	8	2
(Norway) M Aarhus	23	21	19
(Denmark) J S Nielsen	25	17	21

Second round
(Germany) R Viermann	21	22
(Chinese Taipei) Lu Y-t	14	20
(Sweden) J Widoff	21	21
5/8	(England) G Joseph	17	15
(India) S Sharma	21	17	19
(Australia) S Joe	15	21	21
(Denmark) J S Nielsen	15	11
3/4	(Scotland) D Travers	21	20^{r}

Third round
(Germany) R Viermann	12	16
(Sweden) J Widoff	21	21
(Australia) S Joe	16	19
(Denmark) J S Nielsen	21	21

Quarter-finals
(Sweden) J Widoff	21	21	21
(Denmark) J S Nielsen	13	23	16

==== Section 4 ====
First round
(England) S Chung	13	14
(India) S Mahajan	21	21
(Indonesia) O Maslim	21	21
(Switzerland) P Dodd	14	12
(Thailand) T Limsakul	21	21
(United Arab Emirates) U Singh	15	4

Second round
(India) S Mahajan	16	19
(Malaysia) Chan W S	21	21
(Indonesia) O Maslim	21	21
5/8	(France) K Sethuraman	14	19
(Thailand) T Limsakul	21	21
(South Korea) Jeon T-g	10	9
(Germany) R Rüsseler	12
2	(Sweden) C Liljeström	6^{r}

Third round
(Malaysia) Chan W S	16	8
(Indonesia) O Maslim	21	21
(Thailand) T Limsakul	19	23	21
(Germany) R Rüsseler	21	21	17

Quarter-finals
(Indonesia) O Maslim	19	22	21
(Thailand) T Limsakul	21	20	18

== Women's singles ==
=== Seeds ===
1. (Scotland) Christine Black (semi-finals; bronze medalist)
2. (England) Christine Crossley (final; silver medalist)
3. (Germany) Heidi Bender (champion; gold medalist)
4. (Germany) Marie-Luise Schulta-Jansen (second round)

=== Finals ===
Semi-finals
1	(Scotland) Christine Black	11	19
3/4	(Germany) Heidi Bender	21	21
(Japan) Kuniko Yamamoto	20	13
2	(England) Christine Crossley	22	21

Final
3/4	(Germany) Heidi Bender	15	21	21
2	(England) Christine Crossley	21	18	15

=== Top half ===
==== Section 1 ====
First round
(England) A C. Bridge	21	21
(India) N Pasricha	15	14

Second round
1	(Scotland) C Black	21	21
(Japan) S Takebayashi	7	13
(Germany) J Heimann-Feldhoff	22	18
(England) A C. Bridge	24	21

Quarter-finals
1	(Scotland) C Black	21	21
(England) A C. Bridge	10	15

==== Section 2 ====
First round
(China) Chen HQ	21	21
(Chinese Taipei) Yang Lee H-m	5	10
(India) E Pant	3	10
(England) U Heale	21	21

Second round
3/4	(Germany) H Bender	21	21
(China) Chen HQ	2	5
(France) R Mouglalis	17	12
(England) U Heale	21	21

Quarter-finals
3/4	(Germany) H Bender	21	21
(England) U Heale	8	11

=== Bottom half ===
==== Section 3 ====
First round
(Thailand) S Narasak	w	/	o
(India) S Mohan Raj
(England) A Robinson	4	8
(Chinese Taipei) Hwang H-c	21	21

Second round
(Thailand) S Narasak	5^{r}
(Japan) K Yamamoto	13
(Chinese Taipei) Hwang H-c	21	18	22
3/4	(Germany) M-L Schulta-Jansen	19	21	20

Quarter-finals
(Japan) K Yamamoto	21	21
(Chinese Taipei) Hwang H-c	9	12

==== Section 4 ====
First round
(China) Yu XM	21	21
(Germany) M Kiefer	5	11

Second round
(China) Yu XM	21	21
(India) K K Bhatta	12	6
(Japan) Y Motegi	17	22
2	(England) C Crossley	21	24

Quarter-finals
(China) Yu XM	21	18	19
2	(England) C Crossley	19	21	21

== Men's doubles ==
=== Seeds ===
1. (Austria) Tariq Farooq / (Denmark) Karsten Meier (semi-finals; bronze medalists)
2. (England) Ian Richardson / (Scotland) Dan Travers (second round)
3. (Germany) Dieter Frick / Rolf Rüsseler (second round)
4. (Sweden) Cheddi Liljeström / Björn Wigardt (semi-finals; bronze medalists)

=== Finals ===
Semi-finals
1	(Austria) Tariq Farooq (Denmark) Karsten Meier	9	13
(Malaysia) Ong Then Lin (Singapore) Victor Sim	21	21
3/4	(Sweden) Cheddi Liljeström (Sweden) Björn Wigardt	15	9
(Chinese Taipei) Yang Cheng-tsung (Chinese Taipei) Yang Chung-shun	21	21

Final
(Malaysia) Ong Then Lin (Singapore) Victor Sim	21	21
(Chinese Taipei) Yang Cheng-tsung (Chinese Taipei) Yang Chung-shun	14	9

=== Top half ===
==== Section 1 ====
First round
(India) A Dhand (India) S Sharma	21	21
(South Korea) Kim M-s (South Korea) Kim Y-b	13	14
(France) Q T Huynh (France) K Sethuraman	11	21	21
(Germany) E Keller (Germany) J Molodet	21	17	18
(Thailand) C Suvanich (Thailand) T Waranusast	21	21
(United Arab Emirates) L Kunju (United Arab Emirates) U Singh	10	13

Second round
1	(Austria) T Farooq (Denmark) K Meier	15	21	21
(India) A Dhand (India) S Sharma	21	18	15
(France) Q T Huynh (France) K Sethuraman	19	21	9
(Thailand) C Suvanich (Thailand) T Waranusast	21	19	21

Quarter-finals
1	(Austria) T Farooq (Denmark) K Meier	20	21	21
(Thailand) C Suvanich (Thailand) T Waranusast	22	17	19

==== Section 2 ====
First round
3/4	(Germany) D Frick (Germany) R Rüsseler	21	21
(India) P George (India) V K N Kuttiparmbil	9	19
(Malaysia) Chan W S (Malaysia) Tan K L	11	12
(Malaysia) Ong T L (Singapore) V Sim	21	21
(Sweden) B Åberg (Sweden) J Widoff	21	21
(England) G Joseph (England) J Kindred	18	16
(Thailand) T Limsakul (Thailand) P Vasavid	12	14
(South Korea) Kwon S-t (South Korea) Lee E-g	21	21

Second round
3/4	(Germany) D Frick (Germany) R Rüsseler	13	13
(Malaysia) Ong T L (Singapore) V Sim	21	21
(Sweden) B Åberg (Sweden) J Widoff	10	14
(South Korea) Kwon S-t (South Korea) Lee E-g	21	21

Quarter-finals
(Malaysia) Ong T L (Singapore) V Sim	21	21
(South Korea) Kwon S-t (South Korea) Lee E-g	16	17

=== Bottom half ===
==== Section 3 ====
First round
(Denmark) H Anderson (Denmark) J S Nielsen	23	21	17
(Finland) J Nyström (Finland) P von Bruun	25	17	21
(South Korea) Yang H-j (South Korea) Yang S-j	17	14
(Sweden) B C Bertilson (England) N May	21	21
(France) M Chanteur (France) P Jumeaux	16	18
(Thailand) S Aimaub (Thailand) S Chalachol	21	21
(Germany) P Grothues (Germany) N Jesse	4	11
3/4	(Sweden) C Liljeström (Sweden) B Wigardt	21	21

Second round
(Finland) J Nyström (Finland) P von Bruun	19	21	17
(Sweden) B C Bertilson (England) N May	21	16	21
(Thailand) S Aimaub (Thailand) S Chalachol	11	13
3/4	(Sweden) C Liljeström (Sweden) B Wigardt	21	21

Quarter-finals
(Sweden) B C Bertilson (England) N May	16	11
3/4	(Sweden) C Liljeström (Sweden) B Wigardt	21	21

==== Section 4 ====
First round
(South Korea) Im D-k (South Korea) Lee B-h	12	7
(Chinese Taipei) Yang C-t (Chinese Taipei) Yang C-s	21	21
(India) B S Chingshubam (India) K Singh L.
(Germany) J Reiche (Germany) R Viermann	w	/	o
(Thailand) A Maensamut (Thailand) S Pisudchaikul	21	21
(Switzerland) R Bützer (Switzerland) P Dodd	8	9
(England) P Jeffreys (England) L P Loo	4	10
2	(England) I Richardson (Scotland) D Travers	21	21

Second round
(Chinese Taipei) Yang C-t (Chinese Taipei) Yang C-s	21	21
(Germany) J Reiche (Germany) R Viermann	7	6
(Thailand) A Maensamut (Thailand) S Pisudchaikul	21	21
2	(England) I Richardson (Scotland) D Travers	10	18

Quarter-finals
(Chinese Taipei) Yang C-t (Chinese Taipei) Yang C-s	21	17	21
(Thailand) A Maensamut (Thailand) S Pisudchaikul	19	21	13

== Women's doubles ==
=== Seeds ===
1. (England) Betty Bartlett / (Scotland) Christine Black (quarter-finals)
2. (Germany) Heidi Bender / Marie-Luise Schulta-Jansen (semi-finals; bronze medalists)
3. (England) Anne C. Bridge / Christine Crossley (final; silver medalists)
4. (England) Anne Robinson / Lin Wilde (quarter-finals)

=== Finals ===
Semi-finals
(China) Chen Huanqin (China) Yu Xiaomin	12	16
(Japan) Yukiko Motegi (Japan) Kuniko Yamamoto	21	21
3/4	(England) Anne C. Bridge (England) Christine Crossley	21	21
2	(Germany) Heidi Bender (Germany) Marie-Luise Schulta-Jansen	14	18

Final
(Japan) Yukiko Motegi (Japan) Kuniko Yamamoto	21	21
3/4	(England) Anne C. Bridge (England) Christine Crossley	14	13

=== Top half ===
==== Section 1 ====
First round

Second round
1	(England) B Bartlett (Scotland) C Black	w	/	o
(Thailand) S Boonchuay (Thailand) S Narasak
(China) Chen HQ (China) Yu XM	21	21
(Germany) J Heimann-Feldhoff (Germany) M Kiefer	13	9

Quarter-finals
1	(England) B Bartlett (Scotland) C Black	11	14
(China) Chen HQ (China) Yu XM	21	21

==== Section 2 ====
First round

Second round
3/4	(England) A Robinson (England) L Wilde	21	21
SUB	(India) K K Bhatta (India) N Pasricha	15	11
(Japan) Y Motegi (Japan) K Yamamoto	21	21
(South Korea) Jung Y-s (South Korea) Sim T-p	9	15

Quarter-finals
3/4	(England) A Robinson (England) L Wilde	3	8
(Japan) Y Motegi (Japan) K Yamamoto	21	21

=== Bottom half ===
==== Section 3 ====
First round
(Chinese Taipei) Hwang H-c (Chinese Taipei) Yang Lee H-m	21	21
(India) S Shetty B. R. (India) G Johri	8	7

Second round
(Chinese Taipei) Hwang H-c (Chinese Taipei) Yang Lee H-m	16	9
(South Korea) Kwon Y-h (South Korea) Yu Y	21	21
(Japan) J Amo (Japan) K Tsuchiya	9	13
3/4	(England) A C. Bridge (England) C Crossley	21	21

Quarter-finals
(South Korea) Kwon Y-h (South Korea) Yu Y	6	17
3/4	(England) A C. Bridge (England) C Crossley	21	21

==== Section 4 ====
First round

Second round
(France) R Mouglalis (France) M Nouat	8	12
(Japan) M Sato (Japan) S Takebayashi	21	21
(England) A Baker (England) U Heale	13	9
2	(Germany) H Bender (Germany) M-L Schulta-Jansen	21	21

Quarter-finals
(Japan) M Sato (Japan) S Takebayashi	17	16
2	(Germany) H Bender (Germany) M-L Schulta-Jansen	21	21

== Mixed doubles ==
=== Seeds ===
1. (Scotland) Dan Travers / Christine Black (final; silver medalists)
2. (England) Ian Richardson / Christine Crossley (second round)
3. (Germany) Rolf Rüsseler / Marlies Kiefer (second round)
4. (Malaysia) Ong Then Lin / (China) Yu Xiaomin (semi-finals; bronze medalists)

=== Finals ===
Semi-finals
1	(Scotland) Dan Travers (Scotland) Christine Black	22	17	21
3/4	(Malaysia) Ong Then Lin (China) Yu Xiaomin	20	21	16
(Singapore) Foo Kon Fai (Singapore) Bessie Ong	20	19
(South Korea) Lee Eun-gu (South Korea) Yu Yeon	22	21

Final
1	(Scotland) Dan Travers (Scotland) Christine Black	18	17
(South Korea) Lee Eun-gu (South Korea) Yu Yeon	21	21

=== Top half ===
==== Section 1 ====
First round
(Finland) J Nyström (England) K M. Spillane	21	21
(India) S K Patet (India) P Nisha	13	13
(England) P Jeffreys (England) A Baker	7	17
(South Korea) Hong K-p (South Korea) So H-a	21	21

Second round
1	(Scotland) D Travers (Scotland) C Black	21	21
(Finland) J Nyström (England) K M. Spillane	13	12
(Chinese Taipei) Yang C-t (Chinese Taipei) Yang Lee H-m	21	21
(South Korea) Hong K-p (South Korea) So H-a	13	14

Quarter-finals
1	(Scotland) D Travers (Scotland) C Black	21	21
(Chinese Taipei) Yang C-t (Chinese Taipei) Yang Lee H-m	18	11

==== Section 2 ====
First round
(Japan) S Yamamoto (Japan) K Tsuchiya	21	21
(France) Q T Huynh (France) M Nouat	13	16
(Thailand) S Poebaikul (Thailand) S Narasak	21	21
(England) N May (England) U Heale	16	11
(India) L Rokhum (India) Z Hnamte
(Germany) P Grothues (Germany) J Heimann-Feldhoff	w	/	o

Second round
3/4	(Malaysia) Ong T L (China) Yu XM	21	21
(Japan) S Yamamoto (Japan) K Tsuchiya	6	7
(Thailand) S Poebaikul (Thailand) S Narasak	21	21
(Germany) P Grothues (Germany) J Heimann-Feldhoff	14	15

Quarter-finals
3/4	(Malaysia) Ong T L (China) Yu XM	21	21
(Thailand) S Poebaikul (Thailand) S Narasak	12	10

=== Bottom half ===
==== Section 3 ====
First round
(India) N Sakaleshpura (India) K K Bhatta	21	21
(South Korea) Lim J-c (South Korea) Kim M-r	14	7
(Chinese Taipei) Yang C-s (Chinese Taipei) Hwang H-c	16	21	13
(Singapore) Foo K F (Singapore) B Ong	21	17	21
(Austria) T Farooq (Germany) H Bender	21	21
(Thailand) T Waranusast (Thailand) R Luangpipat	13	11

Second round
(India) N Sakaleshpura (India) K K Bhatta	7	12
(Singapore) Foo K F (Singapore) B Ong	21	21
(Austria) T Farooq (Germany) H Bender	21	21
3/4	(Germany) R Rüsseler (Germany) M Kiefer	16	15

Quarter-finals
(Singapore) Foo K F (Singapore) B Ong	16	21	21
(Austria) T Farooq (Germany) H Bender	21	13	18

==== Section 4 ====
First round
(Thailand) J Panitchaikul (Thailand) S Boonchuay	19	19
(Japan) T Kawaguchi (Japan) S Takebayashi	21	21
(India) V K N Kuttiparmbil (India) S Shetty B. R.	7	15
(Denmark) K Meier (Germany) M-L Schulta-Jansen	21	21
(South Korea) Lee E-g (South Korea) Yu Y	21	21
(France) P Jumeaux (France) R Mouglalis	15	6

Second round
(Japan) T Kawaguchi (Japan) S Takebayashi	18	9
(Denmark) K Meier (Germany) M-L Schulta-Jansen	21	21
(South Korea) Lee E-g (South Korea) Yu Y	13	21	21
2	(England) I Richardson (England) C Crossley	21	17	19

Quarter-finals
(Denmark) K Meier (Germany) M-L Schulta-Jansen	12	25
(South Korea) Lee E-g (South Korea) Yu Y	21	27
