= 2023 BWF World Senior Championships – 50+ =

Tournament details
- Dates: 11 September 2023 – 17 September 2023
- Edition: 11
- Level: International
- Competitors: 207 from 27 nations
- Venue: Hwasan Indoor Stadium; Jeonju Indoor Badminton Hall
- Location: Jeonju, South Korea

Champions
- Men's singles: (Indonesia) Marleve Mainaky
- Women's singles: (Denmark) Janne Vang Nielsen
- Men's doubles: (Indonesia) Heryanto Arbi (Indonesia) Marleve Mainaky
- Women's doubles: (Japan) Sayuri Imai (Japan) Junko Numata
- Mixed doubles: (Denmark) Carsten Loesch (England) Julie Bradbury

These are the results of 2023 BWF World Senior Championships' 50+ events.

== Competition schedule ==
Match was played as scheduled below.

| #R | Preliminary rounds | QF | Quarter-finals | SF | Semi-finals | F | Finals |

| H | Hwasan Indoor Stadium | J | Jeonju Indoor Badminton Hall |

| Date | 11 Sep | | 12 Sep | | 13 Sep | | 14 Sep | | 15 Sep | 16 Sep | 17 Sep |
| Venue | H | J | H | J | H | J | H | J | H | H | H |
|---|---|---|---|---|---|---|---|---|---|---|---|
| Men's singles | | | 1R | | | 2R | 3R | | QF | SF | F |
| Women's singles | 1R | | 2R | | | | 3R | | QF | SF | F |
| Men's doubles | 1R | | 2R | | | 3R | QF | | | SF | F |
| Women's doubles | 1R | | | | | 2R | QF | | | SF | F |
| Mixed doubles | 1R | | 2R | | | | 3R | | QF | SF | F |

== Medal summary ==
=== Medal standings ===
* Host nation (South Korea)

2023 BWF World Senior Championships medal table
| Rank | Nation | Gold | Silver | Bronze | Total |
|---|---|---|---|---|---|
| 1 | Indonesia | 2 | 0 | 0 | 2 |
| 2 | Denmark | 1.5 | 0 | 2 | 3.5 |
| 3 | Japan | 1 | 2 | 4 | 7 |
| 4 | England | 0.5 | 2 | 2 | 4.5 |
| 5 | Thailand | 0 | 1 | 0 | 1 |
| 6 | Chinese Taipei | 0 | 0 | 1 | 1 |
| 6 | Netherlands | 0 | 0 | 1 | 1 |
| Totals (7 entries) | | 5 | 5 | 10 | 20 |

=== Medalists ===
| Event | Gold | Silver | Bronze |
|---|---|---|---|
| Men's singles | (Indonesia) Marleve Mainaky | (England) Carl Jennings | (England) Simon Gilhooly |
| Men's singles | (Indonesia) Marleve Mainaky | (England) Carl Jennings | (Denmark) Carsten Loesch |
| Women's singles | (Denmark) Janne Vang Nielsen | (Japan) Kazumi Kimura | (Japan) Reiko Nakamura |
| Women's singles | (Denmark) Janne Vang Nielsen | (Japan) Kazumi Kimura | (Netherlands) Mariëlle van der Woerdt |
| Men's doubles | (Indonesia) Heryanto Arbi (Indonesia) Marleve Mainaky | (Thailand) Chatchai Boonmee (Thailand) Wittaya Panomchai | (England) Carl Jennings (England) Mark King |
| Men's doubles | (Indonesia) Heryanto Arbi (Indonesia) Marleve Mainaky | (Thailand) Chatchai Boonmee (Thailand) Wittaya Panomchai | (Japan) Kei Hamaji (Japan) Shinichi Wakui |
| Women's doubles | (Japan) Sayuri Imai (Japan) Junko Numata | (Japan) Yaeko Kinoshita (Japan) Minako Sakazaki | (Japan) Reiko Nakamura (Japan) Makiko Tsujita |
| Women's doubles | (Japan) Sayuri Imai (Japan) Junko Numata | (Japan) Yaeko Kinoshita (Japan) Minako Sakazaki | (Japan) Naoko Onuma (Japan) Yoko Takashina |
| Mixed doubles | (Denmark) Carsten Loesch (England) Julie Bradbury | (England) Carl Jennings (England) Caroline Hale | (Denmark) Morten Aarup (Denmark) Lene Struwe Andersen |
| Mixed doubles | (Denmark) Carsten Loesch (England) Julie Bradbury | (England) Carl Jennings (England) Caroline Hale | (Chinese Taipei) Huang Chuan-chen (Chinese Taipei) Shyu Yuh-ling |

== Men's singles ==
=== Seeds ===
1. (Chinese Taipei) Wu Chang-jun (quarter-finals)
2. (Sweden) Ulf Svenson (quarter-finals)
3. (India) Vijay Sharma (second round)
4. (Chinese Taipei) Liao Lien-sheng (quarter-finals)
5. (England) Carl Jennings (final; silver medalist)
6. (Denmark) Carsten Loesch (semi-finals; bronze medalist)
7. (Indonesia) Marleve Mainaky (champion; gold medalist)
8. (Sweden) Stefan Edvardsson (first round)

=== Finals ===
Semi-finals
5/8 | (Indonesia) Marleve Mainaky | 21 | 21
(England) Simon Gilhooly | 9 | 9
5/8 | (England) Carl Jennings | 18 | 21 | 21
5/8 | (Denmark) Carsten Loesch | 21 | 15 | 9

Final
5/8 | (Indonesia) Marleve Mainaky | 21 | 21
5/8 | (England) Carl Jennings | 11 | 11

=== Top half ===
==== Section 1 ====
First round
(England) D Britto | 14 | 7
(Denmark) M Aarup | 21 | 21
(Belgium) Y H Siu | 21 | 21
(Austria) A Sudarma | 11 | 18
(South Korea) Kim H-j | 12 | 6
(Bahrain) J Varghese | 21 | 21
5/8 | (Indonesia) M Mainaky | 21 | 21
(Sweden) M Lundqvist | 7 | 9
(India) A Mishra
(France) M D Truong | w | / | o
(United States) C Lai | 19 | 21 | 21
(Sri Lanka) P Samaradiwakara | 21 | 19 | 8
(Germany) A Hirschmann | 21 | 19 | 13
(Malaysia) Ng W K | 12 | 21 | 21

Second round
1 | (Chinese Taipei) Wu C-j | 21 | 21
(Denmark) M Aarup | 11 | 11
(Belgium) Y H Siu | 21 | 21
(Bahrain) J Varghese | 18 | 18
5/8 | (Indonesia) M Mainaky | 21 | 21
(France) M D Truong | 8 | 4
(United States) C Lai | 16 | 5
(Malaysia) Ng W K | 21 | 21

Third round
1 | (Chinese Taipei) Wu C-j | 21 | 21
(Belgium) Y H Siu | 7 | 4
5/8 | (Indonesia) M Mainaky | 21 | 21
(Malaysia) Ng W K | 9 | 8

Quarter-finals
1 | (Chinese Taipei) Wu C-j | 13 | 9
5/8 | (Indonesia) M Mainaky | 21 | 21

==== Section 2 ====
First round
(Japan) M Takai | w | / | o
(Australia) I Long
(Chinese Taipei) Tsai C-c | 11 | 7
(Spain) L A Morcillo | 21 | 21
(United States) R Tulluri | 10 | 15
(South Korea) Song T-y | 21 | 21
5/8 | (Sweden) S Edvardsson | 21 | 9 | 8
(England) S Gilhooly | 17 | 21 | 21
(Czech Republic) L Oros | 21 | 21
(France) P Tisserant | 16 | 18
(Germany) M Anhäuser
(Scotland) F Mcculloch | w | / | o
(Indonesia) Siswanto | 21 | 21
(Thailand) C Vitayatanagorn | 9 | 6

Second round
3/4 | (India) V Sharma | 14 | 18
(Japan) M Takai | 21 | 21
(Spain) L A Morcillo | 21 | 20 | 21
(South Korea) Song T-y | 18 | 22 | 12
(England) S Gilhooly | 21 | 21
(Czech Republic) L Oros | 16 | 13
(Scotland) F Mcculloch | 21 | 21
(Indonesia) Siswanto | 13 | 15

Third round
(Japan) M Takai | 21 | 21
(Spain) L A Morcillo | 12 | 12
(England) S Gilhooly | 21 | 21
(Scotland) F Mcculloch | 9 | 6

Quarter-finals
(Japan) M Takai | 15 | 21 | 9
(England) S Gilhooly | 21 | 15 | 21

=== Bottom half ===
==== Section 3 ====
First round
(Malaysia) Goh C H | 21 | 21
(Germany) F Naumann | 12 | 8
(United Arab Emirates) Pr Kumar K. V. | 21 | 21
(Indonesia) L S Sumarlin | 14 | 10
(Sweden) M Nilsson
(Thailand) S Patamanavin | w | / | o
(Sri Lanka) M Jayaweera | 7 | 2
5/8 | (England) C Jennings | 21 | 21
(Belgium) W Huijs | 12 | 11
(India) A Ramachandran | 21 | 21
(France) P Guichard | 21 | 21
(South Korea) Cheon M-s | 9 | 4
(Japan) H Sahara | 16 | 13
(United States) G Ramireddy | 21 | 21
(Spain) Á Rangil | 9 | 12
3/4 | (Chinese Taipei) Liao L-s | 21 | 21

Second round
(Malaysia) Goh C H | 21 | 21
(United Arab Emirates) Pr Kumar K. V. | 12 | 8
(Thailand) S Patamanavin | 9 | 7
5/8 | (England) C Jennings | 21 | 21
(India) A Ramachandran | 21 | 21
(France) P Guichard | 19 | 15
(United States) G Ramireddy | 8 | 10
3/4 | (Chinese Taipei) Liao L-s | 21 | '21

Third round
(Malaysia) Goh C H | 10 | 11
5/8 | (England) C Jennings | 21 | 21
(India) A Ramachandran | 7 | 18
3/4 | (Chinese Taipei) Liao L-s | 21 | 21

Quarter-finals
5/8 | (England) C Jennings | 21 | 21
3/4 | (Chinese Taipei) Liao L-s | 12 | 8

==== Section 4 ====
First round
(Chinese Taipei) Pai F-c | 21 | 21
(South Korea) Choi S-h | 2 | 11
(Japan) H Oka | 21 | 19 | 21
(France) C-A Lagunegrand | 7 | 21 | 13
(Czech Republic) J Port | 21 | 21
(Germany) O Binus | 13 | 15
(Finland) T Kajava | 15 | 18
5/8 | (Denmark) C Loesch | 21 | 21
(England) N Gandhi | 21 | 21
(New Zealand) M Shah | 6 | 8
(Austria) R Hechenberger | 21 | 21
(Indonesia) T Soedarno | 16 | 15
(Thailand) C Jarutawai | 6 | 10
(India) A K Srivastava | 21 | 21

Second round
(Chinese Taipei) Pai F-c | w | / | o
(Japan) H Oka
(Czech Republic) J Port | 14 | 13
5/8 | (Denmark) C Loesch | 21 | 21
(England) N Gandhi | 16 | 21 | 21
(Austria) R Hechenberger | 21 | 13 | 14
(India) A K Srivastava | 14 | 21 | 19
2 | (Sweden) U Svenson | 21 | 16 | 21

Third round
(Chinese Taipei) Pai F-c | 10 | 8
5/8 | (Denmark) C Loesch | 21 | 21
(England) N Gandhi | 12 | 21 | 16
2 | (Sweden) U Svenson | 21 | 13 | 21

Quarter-finals
5/8 | (Denmark) C Loesch | 21 | 21
2 | (Sweden) U Svenson | 9 | 17

== Women's singles ==
=== Seeds ===
1. (England) Caroline Hale (third round)
2. (Denmark) Janne Vang Nielsen (champion; gold medalist)
3. (Netherlands) Mariëlle van der Woerdt (semi-finals; bronze medalist)
4. (Netherlands) Ineke Lotgering (quarter-finals)
5. (Indonesia) Irene Gunarti (third round)
6. (France) Sylviane Le Pimpec (quarter-finals)
7. (Germany) Stephanie Wigger (second round)
8. (Germany) Michaela Meyer (third round)

=== Finals ===
Semi-finals
(Japan) Reiko Nakamura | 21 | 19 | 13
(Japan) Kazumi Kimura | 16 | 21 | 21
3/4 | (Netherlands) Mariëlle van der Woerdt | 15 | 15
2 | (Denmark) Janne Vang Nielsen | 21 | 21

Final
(Japan) Kazumi Kimura | 18 | 15
2 | (Denmark) Janne Vang Nielsen | 21 | 21

=== Top half ===
==== Section 1 ====
First round

Second round
1 | (England) C Hale | 21 | 21
(France) C Muller | 9 | 6
(India) S S Panwar | 7 | 5
(Japan) R Nakamura | 21 | 21
5/8 | (Germany) S Wigger | 12 | 11
(Thailand) L Ruktapongpisal | 21 | 21
(Greece) G Vernardou | 14 | 6
(South Korea) Kim J-h | 21 | 21

Third round
1 | (England) C Hale | 15 | 20
(Japan) R Nakamura | 21 | 22
(Thailand) L Ruktapongpisal | 21 | 21
(South Korea) Kim J-h | 18 | 9

Quarter-finals
(Japan) R Nakamura | 21 | 21
(Thailand) L Ruktapongpisal | 3 | 4

==== Section 2 ====
First round
(India) S Yadav | 21 | 21
(Denmark) H Mathiasen | 14 | 11

Second round
3/4 | (Netherlands) I Lotgering | 21 | 21
(Switzerland) D Mohaupt | 9 | 12
(South Korea) Cho Y-s | 7 | 3
(Australia) M Bader | 21 | 21
5/8 | (Indonesia) I Gunarti | 21 | 21
(Finland) S Roivainen | 17 | 18
(Japan) K Kimura | 21 | 21
(India) S Yadav | 17 | 15

Third round
3/4 | (Netherlands) I Lotgering | 21 | 16 | 25
(Australia) M Bader | 19 | 21 | 23
5/8 | (Indonesia) I Gunarti | 17 | 15
(Japan) K Kimura | 21 | 21

Quarter-finals
3/4 | (Netherlands) I Lotgering | 17 | 5
(Japan) K Kimura | 21 | 21

=== Bottom half ===
==== Section 3 ====
First round
(Indonesia) Z Mir | 6 | 0^{r}
(England) J Ashfold | 21 | 0

Second round
(England) J Ashfold | 24 | 11 | 19
(India) S Gadhili | 22 | 21 | 21
(Thailand) J Muanwong | 19 | 19
5/8 | (Germany) M Meyer | 21 | 21
(Japan) M Sakazaki | 15 | 21 | 21
(South Korea) Youn S-j | 21 | 4 | 16
(France) P Phanouvong | 8 | 4
3/4 | (Netherlands) M van der Woerdt | 21 | 21

Third round
(India) S Gadhili | 15 | 21 | 21
5/8 | (Germany) M Meyer | 21 | 8 | 16
(Japan) M Sakazaki | 13 | 10
3/4 | (Netherlands) M van der Woerdt | 21 | 21

Quarter-finals
(India) S Gadhili | 15 | 19
3/4 | (Netherlands) M van der Woerdt | 21 | 21

==== Section 4 ====
First round

Second round
(South Korea) Choi M-g | 11 | 5
(India) N Divecha | 21 | 21
(Japan) M Tsujita | 21 | 19 | 17
5/8 | (France) S Le Pimpec | 14 | 21 | 21
(Spain) B Martín | 16 | 14
(Germany) B Köhler | 21 | 21
(Finland) T Helin | 11 | 10
2 | (Denmark) J V Nielsen | 21 | 21

Third round
(India) N Divecha | 22 | 17 | 9
5/8 | (France) S Le Pimpec | 20 | 21 | 21
(Germany) B Köhler | 6 | 7
2 | (Denmark) J V Nielsen | 21 | 21

Quarter-finals
5/8 | (France) S Le Pimpec | 18 | 21 | 16
2 | (Denmark) J V Nielsen | 21 | 12 | 21

== Men's doubles ==
=== Seeds ===
1. (Sweden) Mikael Nilsson / Ulf Svenson (quarter-finals)
2. (Finland) Jari Eriksson / Mika Eriksson (second round)
3. (Denmark) Morten Aarup / Carsten Loesch (quarter-finals)
4. (Sweden) Stefan Edvardsson / (Denmark) Johnny Hast Hansen (second round)
5. (England) Carl Jennings / Mark King (semi-finals; bronze medalists)
6. (Indonesia) Heryanto Arbi / Marleve Mainaky (champion; gold medalists)
7. (Thailand) Chatchai Boonmee / Wittaya Panomchai (final; silver medalists)
8. (England) Justin G. Andrews / Simon Gilhooly (quarter-finals)

=== Finals ===
Semi-finals
5/8 | (Thailand) Chatchai Boonmee (Thailand) Wittaya Panomchai | 13 | 21 | 21
5/8 | (England) Carl Jennings (England) Mark King | 21 | 11 | 19
5/8 | (Indonesia) Heryanto Arbi (Indonesia) Marleve Mainaky | 21 | 21
(Japan) Kei Hamaji (Japan) Shinichi Wakui | 13 | 14

Final
5/8 | (Thailand) Chatchai Boonmee (Thailand) Wittaya Panomchai | 19 | 16
5/8 | (Indonesia) Heryanto Arbi (Indonesia) Marleve Mainaky | 21 | 21

=== Top half ===
==== Section 1 ====
First round
(Indonesia) H Panghegar (Indonesia) Siswanto | 21 | 21
(United States) D Grewal (United States) C Lai | 6 | 15
(Finland) T Kajava (Finland) J Rafols | 11 | 18
(Japan) H Oka (Japan) H Sahara | 21 | 21
(India) B K Barman (India) Ra Sharma | 8 | 9
(South Korea) Kim Y-h (South Korea) Lee Y-s | 21 | 21

Second round
1 | (Sweden) M Nilsson (Sweden) U Svenson | 21 | 21
(Spain) L A Morcillo (Spain) Á Rangil | 11 | 10
(Chinese Taipei) Kuo H-k (Chinese Taipei) Tsai C-c | 11 | 17
(Indonesia) H Panghegar (Indonesia) Siswanto | 21 | 21
5/8 | (Thailand) C Boonmee (Thailand) W Panomchai | 21 | 21
(Japan) H Oka (Japan) H Sahara | 13 | 16
(Sri Lanka) M Gamage (Sri Lanka) P Samaradiwakara | 8 | 8
(South Korea) Kim Y-h (South Korea) Lee Y-s | 21 | 21

Third round
1 | (Sweden) M Nilsson (Sweden) U Svenson | 21 | 21
(Indonesia) H Panghegar (Indonesia) Siswanto | 17 | 14
5/8 | (Thailand) C Boonmee (Thailand) W Panomchai | 21 | 21
(South Korea) Kim Y-h (South Korea) Lee Y-s | 6 | 12

Quarter-finals
1 | (Sweden) M Nilsson (Sweden) U Svenson | 16 | 19
5/8 | (Thailand) C Boonmee (Thailand) W Panomchai | 21 | 21

==== Section 2 ====
First round
(Japan) M Chida (Japan) K Enomoto | 21 | 21
(Chinese Taipei) Cheng H-c (Chinese Taipei) Liao L-s | 11 | 12
(France) P Guichard (France) C-A Lagunegrand | 13 | 10
(India) B Ayaz (India) S Daga | 21 | 21
(South Korea) Seo I-s (South Korea) You Y-h | 14 | 8
(Thailand) P Glanrit (Thailand) P Natapinun | 21 | 21
(Belgium) W Huijs (Sweden) M Tornemo | 18 | 9
(Indonesia) J Cahyadi (Indonesia) T Soedarno | 21 | 21

Second round
3/4 | (Denmark) M Aarup (Denmark) C Loesch | 21 | 11 | 21
(Japan) M Chida (Japan) K Enomoto | 19 | 21 | 17
(United Arab Emirates) Pa Kumar K. V. (United Arab Emirates) Pr Kumar K. V. | 11 | 12
(India) B Ayaz (India) S Daga | 21 | 21
5/8 | (England) C Jennings (England) M King | 21 | 21
(Thailand) P Glanrit (Thailand) P Natapinun | 11 | 8
(Czech Republic) L Oros (Czech Republic) J Port | 13 | 14
(Indonesia) J Cahyadi (Indonesia) T Soedarno | 21 | 21

Third round
3/4 | (Denmark) M Aarup (Denmark) C Loesch | 21 | 21
(India) B Ayaz (India) S Daga | 19 | 11
5/8 | (England) C Jennings (England) M King | 21 | 21
(Indonesia) J Cahyadi (Indonesia) T Soedarno | 14 | 13

Quarter-finals
3/4 | (Denmark) M Aarup (Denmark) C Loesch | 21 | 16 | 16
5/8 | (England) C Jennings (England) M King | 18 | 21 | 21

=== Bottom half ===
==== Section 3 ====
First round
SUB | (Germany) O Binus (Germany) M Kleibel | 11 | 21 | 21
(South Korea) Kim J-g (South Korea) Park H-j | 21 | 17 | 15
(Sweden) K Drake (Sweden) K Svensson | 4 | 5
(Thailand) S Lawwattanathaworn (Thailand) P Wannawichitr | 21 | 21
(Hong Kong) Hsu C (Hong Kong) Li B | 21 | 21
(United Arab Emirates) S Keparambath (United Arab Emirates) P Saji | 14 | 16
(Singapore) Gunawan (Singapore) Ngow K W | 10 | 11
(Chinese Taipei) Huang C-c (Chinese Taipei) Wu C-j | 21 | 21

Second round
SUB | (Germany) O Binus (Germany) M Kleibel | 16 | 24 | 21
(France) S Grad (France) P Tisserant | 21 | 22 | 15
(Thailand) S Lawwattanathaworn (Thailand) P Wannawichitr | 21 | 10 | 16
5/8 | (Indonesia) H Arbi (Indonesia) M Mainaky | 12 | 21 | 21
(Hong Kong) Hsu C (Hong Kong) Li B | 21 | 21
(India) A Patel (India) H Patel | 13 | 15
(Chinese Taipei) Huang C-c (Chinese Taipei) Wu C-j | 21 | 21
3/4 | (Sweden) S Edvardsson (Denmark) J Hast Hansen | 16 | 12

Third round
SUB | (Germany) O Binus (Germany) M Kleibel | 17 | 14
5/8 | (Indonesia) H Arbi (Indonesia) M Mainaky | 21 | 21
(Hong Kong) Hsu C (Hong Kong) Li B | 16 | 12
(Chinese Taipei) Huang C-c (Chinese Taipei) Wu C-j | 21 | 21

Quarter-finals
5/8 | (Indonesia) H Arbi (Indonesia) M Mainaky | 21 | 21
(Chinese Taipei) Huang C-c (Chinese Taipei) Wu C-j | 14 | 18

==== Section 4 ====
First round
(India) S Ray (India) H K Sengupta | 21 | 21
(Austria) R Hechenberger (Austria) A Sudarma | 14 | 12
(South Korea) Lee J-k (South Korea) Park S-k | 20 | 21 | 21
(United States) R Dudani (England) N Gandhi | 22 | 11 | 23
(Japan) K Hamaji (Japan) S Wakui | 15 | 21 | 21
(Malaysia) Goh C H (Malaysia) Loh S C | 21 | 18 | 11

Second round
(India) S Ray (India) H K Sengupta | 21 | 21 | 17
(Germany) A Hirschmann (Australia) I Long | 23 | 13 | 21
(United States) R Dudani (England) N Gandhi | 21 | 8 | 11
5/8 | (England) J G. Andrews (England) S Gilhooly | 17 | 21 | 21
(Japan) K Hamaji (Japan) S Wakui | 21 | 21
(Thailand) N Surakkhaka (Thailand) C Vitayatanagorn | 17 | 9
(Sweden) M Lundqvist (Sweden) M Thor | 21 | 24
2 | (Finland) J Eriksson (Finland) M Eriksson | 19 | 22

Third round
(Germany) A Hirschmann (Australia) I Long | 15 | 12
5/8 | (England) J G. Andrews (England) S Gilhooly | 21 | 21
(Japan) K Hamaji (Japan) S Wakui | 21 | 21
(Sweden) M Lundqvist (Sweden) M Thor | 17 | 10

Quarter-finals
5/8 | (England) J G. Andrews (England) S Gilhooly | 21 | 15 | 22
(Japan) K Hamaji (Japan) S Wakui | 7 | 21 | 24

== Women's doubles ==
=== Seeds ===
1. (England) Elizabeth Austin / Caroline Hale (second round)
2. (Denmark) Lene Struwe Andersen / Hanne Bertelsen (second round)
3. (France) Sylviane Le Pimpec / Marie-Noëlle Lechalupe (first round)
4. (Netherlands) Ineke Lotgering / (Germany) Michaela Meyer (quarter-finals)

=== Finals ===
Semi-finals
(Japan) Reiko Nakamura (Japan) Makiko Tsujita | 7 | 7
(Japan) Yaeko Kinoshita (Japan) Minako Sakazaki | 21 | 21
(Japan) Sayuri Imai (Japan) Junko Numata | 17 | 22 | 21
(Japan) Naoko Onuma (Japan) Yoko Takashina | 21 | 20 | 19

Final
(Japan) Yaeko Kinoshita (Japan) Minako Sakazaki | 12 | 17
(Japan) Sayuri Imai (Japan) Junko Numata | 21 | 21

=== Top half ===
==== Section 1 ====
First round
(South Korea) K-l Hemingway (South Korea) Kim G-s | 1 | 8
(Japan) R Nakamura (Japan) M Tsujita | 21 | 21
(United States) LX Li (United States) H Wu | 21 | 21
(India) N Divecha (India) W Patil | 12 | 11
(Thailand) S Lertwisettheerakul (Thailand) V Sattayapun | 21 | 17 | 21
(Denmark) G Mathiasen (Denmark) H Mathiasen | 19 | 21 | 14

Second round
1 | (England) E Austin (England) C Hale | 21 | 15 | 18
(Japan) R Nakamura (Japan) M Tsujita | 18 | 21 | 21
(United States) LX Li (United States) H Wu | 9 | 25
(Thailand) S Lertwisettheerakul (Thailand) V Sattayapun | 21 | 27

Quarter-finals
(Japan) R Nakamura (Japan) M Tsujita | 21 | 19 | 21
(Thailand) S Lertwisettheerakul (Thailand) V Sattayapun | 7 | 21 | 11

==== Section 2 ====
First round
3/4 | (Netherlands) I Lotgering (Germany) M Meyer | 21 | 21
(Thailand) J Thongpanangpan (Thailand) V Trairatnopas | 9 | 10
(Germany) B Köhler (Germany) S Wigger | 19 | 25 | 14
(South Korea) Lim Y-l (South Korea) Park M-j | 21 | 23 | 21
(India) R Garg (India) S Shetty
(Chinese Taipei) Chen M-j (Chinese Taipei) Huang S-f | w | / | o
(Japan) Y Kinoshita (Japan) M Sakazaki | 21 | 21
(France) C Muller (France) P Phanouvong | 7 | 5

Second round
3/4 | (Netherlands) I Lotgering (Germany) M Meyer | 21 | 21
(South Korea) Lim Y-l (South Korea) Park M-j | 4 | 6
(Chinese Taipei) Chen M-j (Chinese Taipei) Huang S-f | 7 | 9
(Japan) Y Kinoshita (Japan) M Sakazaki | 21 | 21

Quarter-finals
3/4 | (Netherlands) I Lotgering (Germany) M Meyer | 11 | 5
(Japan) Y Kinoshita (Japan) M Sakazaki | 21 | 21

=== Bottom half ===
==== Section 3 ====
First round
(South Korea) Jin H-j (South Korea) Kim J-y | 3 | 3
(Thailand) P Kaosamaang (Thailand) B Tanthammaroj | 21 | 21
(India) S Gadhili (India) Ru Sharma | 21 | 21
(Switzerland) D Mohaupt (France) L Renon | 16 | 10
(Spain) B Martín (Greece) G Vernardou | 7 | 12
(Finland) T Helin (Finland) S Roivainen | 21 | 21
(Japan) S Imai (Japan) J Numata | 21 | 21
3/4 | (France) S La Pimpec (France) M-N Lechalupe | 5 | 6

Second round
(Thailand) P Kaosamaang (Thailand) B Tanthammaroj | 21 | 21
(India) S Gadhili (India) Ru Sharma | 9 | 8
(Finland) T Helin (Finland) S Roivainen | 9 | 7
(Japan) S Imai (Japan) J Numata | 21 | 21

Quarter-finals
(Thailand) P Kaosamaang (Thailand) B Tanthammaroj | 13 | 19
(Japan) S Imai (Japan) J Numata | 21 | 21

==== Section 4 ====
First round
(India) S S Panwar (India) S Yadav | 21 | 21
(South Korea) Jung S-h (South Korea) Um J-y | 12 | 2
(England) J Ashfold (England) S Foster | 21 | 21
(Sri Lanka) B Koralage (Indonesia) Tjendrawati | 7 | 14
(Japan) N Onuma (Japan) Y Takashina | 21 | 21
(Germany) J Bolduan (Germany) J Felber | 10 | 8

Second round
(India) S S Panwar (India) S Yadav | 18 | 13
(England) J Ashfold (England) S Foster | 21 | 21
(Japan) N Onuma (Japan) Y Takashina | 21 | 21
2 | (Denmark) L S Andersen (Denmark) H Bertelsen | 15 | 14

Quarter-finals
(England) J Ashfold (England) S Foster | 10 | 12
(Japan) N Onuma (Japan) Y Takashina | 21 | 21

== Mixed doubles ==
=== Seeds ===
1. (Denmark) Morten Aarup / Lene Struwe Andersen (semi-finals; bronze medalists)
2. (England) Simon Gilhooly / Sara Foster (third round)
3. (England) Carl Jennings / Caroline Hale (final; silver medalists)
4. (Denmark) Carsten Loesch / (England) Julie Bradbury (champion; gold medalists)
5. (Indonesia) Johan Cahyadi / Irene Gunarti (quarter-finals)
6. (Finland) Jari Eriksson / Sari Roivainen (third round)
7. (Denmark) Johnny Hast Hansen / Dorte Steenberg (quarter-finals)
8. (Sweden) Stefan Edvardsson / (Denmark) Janne Vang Nielsen (quarter-finals)

=== Finals ===
Semi-finals
1 | (Denmark) Morten Aarup (Denmark) Lene Struwe Andersen | 13 | 13
3/4 | (England) Carl Jennings (England) Caroline Hale | 21 | 21
3/4 | (Denmark) Carsten Loesch (England) Julie Bradbury | 21 | 27
(Chinese Taipei) Huang Chuan-chen (Chinese Taipei) Shyu Yuh-ling | 14 | 25

Final
3/4 | (England) Carl Jennings (England) Caroline Hale | 20 | 12
3/4 | (Denmark) Carsten Loesch (England) Julie Bradbury | 22 | 21

=== Top half ===
==== Section 1 ====
First round
(South Korea) Seo I-s (South Korea) Kim G-s | 14 | 14
(Sri Lanka) M Gamage (Greece) G Vernardou | 21 | 21
(Japan) K Enomoto (Japan) J Numata | 21 | 16 | 18
(Thailand) P Wannawichitr (Thailand) P Kaosamaang | 19 | 21 | 21
(India) U Varma (India) S Shetty | 15 | 14
SUB | (Chinese Taipei) Tsai C-c (Japan) K Kimura | 21 | 21

Second round
1 | (Denmark) M Aarup (Denmark) L S Andersen | 21 | 21
(Sweden) F Ingemansson (Netherlands) I Lotgering | 13 | 11
(France) P Tisserant (France) P Phanouvong | 21 | 21
(Sri Lanka) M Gamage (Greece) G Vernardou | 6 | 9
5/8 | (Sweden) S Edvardsson (Denmark) J V Nielsen | 21 | 21
(Thailand) P Wannawichitr (Thailand) P Kaosamaang | 13 | 15
(Belgium) W Huijs (Belgium) H Rovers | 17 | 21 | 21
SUB | (Chinese Taipei) Tsai C-c (Japan) K Kimura | 21 | 10 | 18

Third round
1 | (Denmark) M Aarup (Denmark) L S Andersen | 21 | 21
(France) P Tisserant (France) P Phanouvong | 13 | 8
5/8 | (Sweden) S Edvardsson (Denmark) J V Nielsen | 21 | 21
(Belgium) W Huijs (Belgium) H Rovers | 9 | 14

Quarter-finals
1 | (Denmark) M Aarup (Denmark) L S Andersen | 21 | 21 | 21
5/8 | (Sweden) S Edvardsson (Denmark) J V Nielsen | 23 | 15 | 7

==== Section 2 ====
First round
(France) P Guichard (France) S Le Pimpec | 22 | 21
(United States) C Lai (United States) D Lai | 20 | 19
(South Korea) You Y-h (South Korea) Jung S-h | 9 | 9
(Thailand) C Jarutawai (Thailand) S Jarutawai | 21 | 21
(Japan) S Wakui (Japan) Y Takashina | 20 | 21 | 21
(Bahrain) J Varghese (United Arab Emirates) V P Manghnani | 22 | 14 | 16

Second round
3/4 | (England) C Jennings (England) C Hale | 21 | 21
(Chinese Taipei) Kuo H-k (Chinese Taipei) Chen M-j | 12 | 9
(India) A Patel (India) R Garg | 21 | 15 | 21
(France) P Guichard (France) S Le Pimpec | 16 | 21 | 15
5/8 | (Finland) J Eriksson (Finland) S Roivainen | 21 | 21
(Thailand) C Jarutawai (Thailand) S Jarutawai | 11 | 7
(Germany) A Hirschmann (Germany) S Wigger | 10 | 13
(Japan) S Wakui (Japan) Y Takashina | 21 | 21

Third round
3/4 | (England) C Jennings (England) C Hale | 21 | 21
(India) A Patel (India) R Garg | 16 | 3
5/8 | (Finland) J Eriksson (Finland) S Roivainen | 21 | 9 | 9
(Japan) S Wakui (Japan) Y Takashina | 13 | 21 | 21

Quarter-finals
3/4 | (England) C Jennings (England) C Hale | 21 | 21
(Japan) S Wakui (Japan) Y Takashina | 15 | 17

=== Bottom half ===
==== Section 3 ====
First round
(Japan) K Hamaji (Japan) N Onuma | 21 | 21
(Chinese Taipei) Liu W-s (Chinese Taipei) Chuang T-y | 5 | 15
(Czech Republic) L Oros (Switzerland) D Mohaupt | 21 | 20 | 14
(Germany) S Schrader (Germany) M Meyer | 18 | 22 | 21
(Finland) T Kajava (Finland) T Helin | 18 | 17
(France) S Grad (France) M-N Lechalupe | 21 | 21

Second round
(Japan) K Hamaji (Japan) N Onuma | 23 | 22 | 22
(England) J G. Andrews (England) J Ashfold | 21 | 24 | 20
(Germany) S Schrader (Germany) M Meyer
5/8 | (Indonesia) J Cahyadi (Indonesia) I Gunarti | w | / | o
(France) S Grad (France) M-N Lechalupe | 11 | 21 | 19
(India) K V Makode (India) Ru Sharma | 21 | 13 | 21
(South Korea) Lee B-s (South Korea) Kim J-s | 2 | 3
3/4 | (Denmark) C Loesch (England) J Bradbury | 21 | 21

Third round
(Japan) K Hamaji (Japan) N Onuma | 17 | 12
5/8 | (Indonesia) J Cahyadi (Indonesia) I Gunarti | 21 | 21
(India) K V Makode (India) Ru Sharma | 8 | 7
3/4 | (Denmark) C Loesch (England) J Bradbury | 21 | 21

Quarter-finals
5/8 | (Indonesia) J Cahyadi (Indonesia) I Gunarti | 23 | 16 | 11
3/4 | (Denmark) C Loesch (England) J Bradbury | 21 | 21 | 21

==== Section 4 ====
First round
(Sri Lanka) S Pradeep (Sri Lanka) B Koralage | 13 | 14
(Sweden) K Svensson (United States) H Wu | 21 | 21
(Germany) O Binus (Germany) J Bolduan | 13 | 15
(Thailand) N Surakkhaka (Thailand) S Lertwisettheerakul | 21 | 21
(South Korea) Park Y-g (South Korea) Park M-g | 4 | 6
(Chinese Taipei) Huang C-c (Chinese Taipei) Shyu Y-l | 21 | 21

Second round
(Sweden) K Svensson (United States) H Wu | 10 | 12
(Czech Republic) J Port (Australia) M Bader | 21 | 21
(Thailand) N Surakkhaka (Thailand) S Lertwisettheerakul | 13 | 17
5/8 | (Denmark) J Hast Hansen (Denmark) D Steenberg | 21 | 21
(Chinese Taipei) Huang C-c (Chinese Taipei) Shyu Y-l | 22 | 21
(Japan) M Chida (Japan) S Imai | 20 | 16
(India) M Thangavelu (India) S Holla | 18 | 19
2 | (England) S Gilhooly (England) S Foster | 21 | 21

Third round
(Czech Republic) J Port (Australia) M Bader | 11 | 8
5/8 | (Denmark) J Hast Hansen (Denmark) D Steenberg | 21 | 21
(Chinese Taipei) Huang C-c (Chinese Taipei) Shyu Y-l | 21 | 21
2 | (England) S Gilhooly (England) S Foster | 19 | 18

Quarter-finals
5/8 | (Denmark) J Hast Hansen (Denmark) D Steenberg | 15 | 13
(Chinese Taipei) Huang C-c (Chinese Taipei) Shyu Y-l | 21 | 21
