= 2023 BWF World Senior Championships – 75+ =

Tournament details
- Dates: 11 September 2023 – 17 September 2023
- Edition: 11
- Level: International
- Competitors: 49 from 11 nations
- Venue: Hwasan Indoor Stadium; Jeonju Indoor Badminton Hall
- Location: Jeonju, South Korea

Champions
- Men's singles: (Finland) Carl-Johan Nybergh
- Women's singles: (England) Mary Jenner
- Men's doubles: (England) Michael John Cox (England) Jim Garrett
- Women's doubles: (England) Linda Coombes (England) Jan Hewett
- Mixed doubles: (England) Jim Garrett (England) Mary Jenner

These are the results of 2023 BWF World Senior Championships' 75+ events.

== Competition schedule ==
All events will be competed in round robin, except men's singles event.

#R	Preliminary rounds	GS	Group stage	QF	Quarter-finals	SF	Semi-finals	F	Finals

H	Hwasan Indoor Stadium	J	Jeonju Indoor Badminton Hall

Date	11 Sep		12 Sep		13 Sep		14 Sep		15 Sep	16 Sep	17 Sep
Venue	H	J	H	J	H	J	H	J	H	H	H
Men's singles					1R			2R	QF	SF	F
Women's singles		GS	GS		GS					SF	F
Men's doubles		GS	GS		GS			GS	QF	SF	F
Women's doubles		GS			GS			GS	GS	GS	
Mixed doubles		GS	GS		GS			GS	QF	SF	F

== Medal summary ==
=== Medal standings ===
* Host nation (South Korea)

2023 BWF World Senior Championships medal table
Rank	Nation	Gold	Silver	Bronze	Total
1	England	4	2	1	7
2	Finland	1	0	0	1
3	Germany	0	1.5	0	1.5
4	Japan	0	1	1	2
5	Denmark	0	0.5	3.5	4
6	Thailand	0	0	1.5	1.5
7	India	0	0	1	1
7	New Zealand	0	0	1	1
Totals (8 entries)		5	5	9	19

=== Medalists ===
Event	Gold	Silver	Bronze
Men's singles	(Finland) Carl-Johan Nybergh	(England) Jim Garrett	(New Zealand) Agus Husin
Men's singles	(Finland) Carl-Johan Nybergh	(England) Jim Garrett	(Denmark) Per Dabelsteen
Women's singles	(England) Mary Jenner	(Germany) Elvira Richter	(India) Gowramma Veeralinga
Women's singles	(England) Mary Jenner	(Germany) Elvira Richter	(Denmark) Irene Sterlie
Men's doubles	(England) Michael John Cox (England) Jim Garrett	(Japan) Masaki Furuhashi (Japan) Hiroshi Yoshida	(Thailand) Pramot Khaosamang (Thailand) Apirat Siwapornpitak
Men's doubles	(England) Michael John Cox (England) Jim Garrett	(Japan) Masaki Furuhashi (Japan) Hiroshi Yoshida	(Denmark) Per Dabelsteen (Thailand) Pirachitra Surakkhaka
Women's doubles	(England) Linda Coombes (England) Jan Hewett	(Germany) Elvira Richter (Denmark) Irene Sterlie	(Japan) Hiromi Ayama (Japan) Setsuko Yano
Mixed doubles	(England) Jim Garrett (England) Mary Jenner	(England) Ian Brothers (England) Jan Hewett	(Denmark) Per Dabelsteen (Denmark) Irene Sterlie
Mixed doubles	(England) Jim Garrett (England) Mary Jenner	(England) Ian Brothers (England) Jan Hewett	(England) Kenneth Tantum (England) Sue Awcock

== Men's singles ==
=== Seeds ===
1. (Thailand) Pirachitra Surakkhaka (second round)
2. (Denmark) Per Dabelsteen (; medalist)
3. (Germany) Matthias Kiefer (second round)
4. (Finland) Carl-Johan Nybergh (; medalist)

=== Bracket ===
First round
(Thailand) A Siwapornpitak	16	17
(Japan) Y Fuchida	21	21
(India) S D Kudchadker	12	5
(Thailand) P Khaosamang	21	21

Second round
1	(Thailand) P Surakkhaka	13	14
(India) J P Ramappa	21	21
(Germany) G Pflug	10	17
(New Zealand) A Husin	21	21
3/4	(Finland) C-J Nybergh	21	18	21
(England) P Chang	17	21	7
(India) M Mandayam	21	20	21
(Japan) Y Fuchida	17	21	7
(England) J Garrett	21	21
(Thailand) P Khaosamang	13	14
(Japan) A Hirota	21	21
3/4	(Germany) M Kiefer	3	5
(Australia) A Lourdes	12	13
(Thailand) S Chintanaseri	21	21
(India) R L Maroo	2	4
2	(Denmark) P Dabelsteen	21	21

Quarter-finals
(India) J P Ramappa	11	11
(New Zealand) A Husin	21	21
3/4	(Finland) C-J Nybergh	21	21
(India) M Mandayam	7	8
(England) J Garrett	21	15	21
(Japan) A Hirota	19	21	13
(Thailand) S Chintanaseri	19	8
2	(Denmark) P Dabelsteen	21	21

Semi-finals
(New Zealand) Agus Husin	5	17
3/4	(Finland) Carl-Johan Nybergh	21	21
(England) Jim Garrett	23	21
2	(Denmark) Per Dabelsteen	21	16

Final
(Finland) Carl-Johan Nybergh	21	21
(England) Jim Garrett	18	19

== Women's singles ==
=== Seeds ===
1. (England) Mary Jenner (champion; gold medalist)
2. (Germany) Elvira Richter (final; silver medalist)

=== Group A ===
Pos	Team	Pld	W	L	GF	GA	GD	PF	PA	PD	Qualification
1	(England) Mary Jenner [1]	2	2	0	4	0	+4	86	42	+44	Qualification to elimination stage
2	(Denmark) Irene Sterlie	2	1	1	2	2	0	78	63	+15	Qualification to elimination stage
3	(India) Sarada Devi Vedurlapalli	2	0	2	0	4	−4	25	84	−59	

Source: Group A – standings

Date		Score		Game 1	Game 2	Game 3	Venue
Sep 11	Mary Jenner (England)	2–0	(Denmark) Irene Sterlie	21–15	23–21		Jeonju Indoor Stadium
Sep 12	Sarada Devi Vedurlapalli (India)	0–2	(Denmark) Irene Sterlie	7–21	12–21		Hwasan Indoor Stadium
Sep 13	Mary Jenner (England)	2–0	(India) Sarada Devi Vedurlapalli	21–4	21–2		Hwasan Indoor Stadium

=== Group B ===
Pos	Team	Pld	W	L	GF	GA	GD	PF	PA	PD	Qualification
1	(Germany) Elvira Richter [2]	2	2	0	4	1	+3	103	44	+59	Qualification to elimination stage
2	(India) Gowramma Veeralinga	2	1	1	3	2	+1	81	83	−2	Qualification to elimination stage
3	(India) Usha Sharma	2	0	2	0	4	−4	27	84	−57	

Source: Group B – standings

Date		Score		Game 1	Game 2	Game 3	Venue
Sep 11	Elvira Richter (Germany)	2–0	(India) Usha Sharma	21–2	21–3		Jeonju Indoor Stadium
Sep 12	Gowramma Veeralinga (India)	2–0	(India) Usha Sharma	21–11	21–11		Hwasan Indoor Stadium
Sep 13	Elvira Richter (Germany)	2–1	(India) Gowramma Veeralinga	21–10	19–21	21–8	Hwasan Indoor Stadium

=== Elimination stage ===
Semi-finals
1	(England) Mary Jenner	21	21
(India) Gowramma Veeralinga	10	8
(Denmark) Irene Sterlie	16	20
2	(Germany) Elvira Richter	21	22

Final
1	(England) Mary Jenner	21	21
2	(Germany) Elvira Richter	14	18

== Men's doubles ==
=== Seeds ===
1. (England) Ian Brothers / Kenneth Tantum (quarter-finals)
2. (Denmark) Per Dabelsteen / (Thailand) Pirachitra Surakkhaka (semi-finals; bronze medalists)
3. (Germany) Matthias Kiefer / Gerd Pflug (group stage)
4. (Japan) Akira Hirota / Shinjiro Matsuda (quarter-finals)

=== Group stage ===
==== Group A ====
Pos	Team	Pld	W	L	GF	GA	GD	PF	PA	PD	Qualification
1	(Thailand) Pramot Khaosamang (Thailand) Apirat Siwapornpitak	2	2	0	4	1	+3	105	81	+24	Qualification to elimination stage
2	(England) Ian Brothers (England) Kenneth Tantum [1]	2	1	1	3	2	+1	93	96	−3	Qualification to elimination stage
3	(South Korea) Kwon Young-hyun (South Korea) Shin Dong-soo (H)	2	0	2	0	4	−4	63	84	−21	

Source: Group A – standings
(H) Host

Date		Score		Game 1	Game 2	Game 3	Venue
Sep 11	Ian Brothers (England); Kenneth Tantum (England)	2–0	(South Korea) Kwon Young-hyun (South Korea) Shin Dong-soo	21–17	21–6		Jeonju Indoor Stadium
Sep 12	Pramot Khaosamang (Thailand); Apirat Siwapornpitak (Thailand)	2–0	(South Korea) Kwon Young-hyun (South Korea) Shin Dong-soo	21–15	21–15		Hwasan Indoor Stadium
Sep 13	Ian Brothers (England); Kenneth Tantum (England)	1–2	(Thailand) Pramot Khaosamang (Thailand) Apirat Siwapornpitak	22–20	20–22	9–21	Hwasan Indoor Stadium

==== Group B ====
Pos	Team	Pld	W	L	GF	GA	GD	PF	PA	PD	Qualification
1	(Denmark) Per Dabelsteen (Thailand) Pirachitra Surakkhaka [2]	1	1	0	2	0	+2	42	23	+19	Qualification to elimination stage
2	(United States) Peter Chang (Australia) Anthony Lourdes	1	0	1	0	2	−2	23	42	−19	Qualification to elimination stage
3	(South Korea) Hong Sun-gi (South Korea) Sin Douk-gyun (H, Z)	0	0	0	0	0	0	0	0	0	

Source: Group B – standings
(H) Host; (Z) Retired after one match.

Date		Score		Game 1	Game 2	Game 3	Venue
Sep 11	Per Dabelsteen (Denmark); Pirachitra Surakkhaka (Thailand)	2–0	(United States) Peter Chang (Australia) Anthony Lourdes	21–13	21–10		Jeonju Indoor Stadium
Sep 13	Hong Sun-gi (South Korea); Sin Douk-gyun (South Korea)	~~2–1~~	(United States) Peter Chang (Australia) Anthony Lourdes	~~15–21~~	~~21–12~~	~~23–21~~	Hwasan Indoor Stadium
Sep 14	Per Dabelsteen (Denmark); Pirachitra Surakkhaka (Thailand)	w/o	(South Korea) Hong Sun-gi (South Korea) Sin Douk-gyun	Walkover			

==== Group C ====
Pos	Team	Pld	W	L	GF	GA	GD	PF	PA	PD	Qualification
1	(Japan) Masaki Furuhashi (Japan) Hiroshi Yoshida	2	2	0	4	0	+4	84	36	+48	Qualification to elimination stage
2	(Thailand) Seri Chintanaseri (Thailand) Kaew Thuemoun	2	1	1	2	2	0	67	60	+7	Qualification to elimination stage
3	(Germany) Matthias Kiefer (Germany) Gerd Pflug [3/4]	2	0	2	0	4	−4	29	84	−55	
4	(India) Kiran Babu Chekuru (India) Ramanaiah Gungeti (Z)	0	0	0	0	0	0	0	0	0	

Source: Group C – standings
(Z) Withdrew.

Date		Score		Game 1	Game 2	Game 3	Venue
Sep 11	Matthias Kiefer (Germany); Gerd Pflug (Germany)	0–2	(Japan) Masaki Furuhashi (Japan) Hiroshi Yoshida	6–21	5–21		Jeonju Indoor Stadium
Sep 12	Seri Chintanaseri (Thailand); Kaew Thuemoun (Thailand)	0–2	(Japan) Masaki Furuhashi (Japan) Hiroshi Yoshida	12–21	13–21		Hwasan Indoor Stadium
Sep 13	Matthias Kiefer (Germany); Gerd Pflug (Germany)	0–2	(Thailand) Seri Chintanaseri (Thailand) Kaew Thuemoun	6–21	12–21		Hwasan Indoor Stadium

==== Group D ====
Pos	Team	Pld	W	L	GF	GA	GD	PF	PA	PD	Qualification
1	(England) Michael John Cox (England) Jim Garrett	2	2	0	4	1	+3	101	75	+26	Qualification to elimination stage
2	(Japan) Akira Hirota (Japan) Shinjiro Matsuda [3/4]	2	1	1	2	2	0	71	70	+1	Qualification to elimination stage
3	(India) Satish Dhondu Kudchadker (India) Murali Mandayam	2	0	2	1	4	−3	73	100	−27	

Source: Group D – standings

Date		Score		Game 1	Game 2	Game 3	Venue
Sep 11	Akira Hirota (Japan); Shinjiro Matsuda (Japan)	0–2	(England) Michael John Cox (England) Jim Garrett	9–21	20–22		Jeonju Indoor Hall
Sep 13	Satish Dhondu Kudchadker (India); Murali Mandayam (India)	1–'2	(England) Michael John Cox (England) Jim Garrett	17–21	21–16	8–21	
Sep 14	Akira Hirota (Japan); Shinjiro Matsuda (Japan)	2–0	(India) Satish Dhondu Kudchadker (India) Murali Mandayam	21–16	21–11		

=== Elimination stage ===
Semi-finals
(Thailand) Pramot Khaosamang (Thailand) Apirat Siwapornpitak	w	/	o
(United States) Peter Chang (Australia) Anthony Lourdes
(England) Michael John Cox (England) Jim Garrett	21	21
(Japan) Akira Hirota (Japan) Shinjiro Matsuda	17	15
(Thailand) Seri Chintanaseri (Thailand) Kaew Thuemoun	19	5
(Japan) Masaki Furuhashi (Japan) Hiroshi Yoshida	21	21
1	(England) Ian Brothers (England) Kenneth Tantum	8	18
2	(Denmark) Per Dabelsteen (Thailand) Pirachitra Surakkhaka	21	21

Final
(Thailand) Pramot Khaosamang (Thailand) Apirat Siwapornpitak	17	16
(England) Michael John Cox (England) Jim Garrett	21	21
(Japan) Masaki Furuhashi (Japan) Hiroshi Yoshida	21	21
2	(Denmark) Per Dabelsteen (Thailand) Pirachitra Surakkhaka	17	15

Finals
(England) Michael John Cox (England) Jim Garrett	21	18	21
(Japan) Masaki Furuhashi (Japan) Hiroshi Yoshida	17	21	13

== Women's doubles ==
=== Seeds ===
1. (Germany) Elvira Richter / (Denmark) Irene Sterlie (silver medalists)
2. (England) Linda Coombes / Jan Hewett (gold medalists)

=== Draw ===
Pos	Team	Pld	W	L	GF	GA	GD	PF	PA	PD	
1	(England) Linda Coombes (England) Jan Hewett [2]	4	4	0	8	0	+8	169	106	+63	Gold medalist
2	(Germany) Elvira Richter (Denmark) Irene Sterlie [1]	4	2	2	5	4	+1	165	147	+18	Silver medalist
3	(Japan) Hiromi Ayama (Japan) Setsuko Yano	4	2	2	4	4	0	147	143	+4	Bronze medalist
4	(England) Sue Awcock (England) Mary Jenner	4	2	2	4	5	−1	163	171	−8	
5	(South Korea) Choi Kwang-ja (South Korea) Lee Mi-guen (H)	4	0	4	0	8	−8	91	168	−77	

Source: Draw
(H) Host

Date		Score		Game 1	Game 2	Game 3	Venue
Sep 11	Linda Coombes (England); Jan Hewett (England)	2–0	(England) Sue Awcock (England) Mary Jenner	21–9	21–19		Jeonju Indoor Hall
Sep 11	Elvira Richter (Germany); Irene Sterlie (Denmark)	2–0	(South Korea) Choi Kwang-ja (South Korea) Lee Mi-guen	21–8	21–9		Jeonju Indoor Stadium
Sep 13	Elvira Richter (Germany); Irene Sterlie (Denmark)	1–2	(England) Sue Awcock (England) Mary Jenner	21–19	19–21	19–21	Hwasan Indoor Stadium
Sep 13	Hiromi Ayama (Japan); Setsuko Yano (Japan)	2–0	(South Korea) Choi Kwang-ja (South Korea) Lee Mi-guen	21–17	21–9		Hwasan Indoor Stadium
Sep 14	Elvira Richter (Germany); Irene Sterlie (Denmark)	2–0	(Japan) Hiromi Ayama (Japan) Setsuko Yano	21–16	21–11		Jeonju Indoor Stadium
Sep 14	Linda Coombes (England); Jan Hewett (England)	2–0	(South Korea) Choi Kwang-ja (South Korea) Lee Mi-guen	21–7	21–13		Jeonju Indoor Stadium
Sep 15	Linda Coombes (England); Jan Hewett (England)	2–0	(Japan) Hiromi Ayama (Japan) Setsuko Yano	22–20	21–16		Hwasan Indoor Stadium
Sep 15	Sue Awcock (England); Mary Jenner (England)	2–0	(South Korea) Choi Kwang-ja (South Korea) Lee Mi-guen	21–10	21–18		Hwasan Indoor Stadium
Sep 16	Elvira Richter (Germany); Irene Sterlie (Denmark)	0–2	(England) Linda Coombes (England) Jan Hewett	14–21	8–21		Hwasan Indoor Stadium
Sep 16	Hiromi Ayama (Japan); Setsuko Yano (Japan)	2–0	(England) Sue Awcock (England) Mary Jenner	21–16	21–16		Hwasan Indoor Stadium

== Mixed doubles ==
=== Seeds ===
1. (Denmark) Per Dabelsteen / Irene Sterlie (semi-finals; bronze medlists)
2. (England) Ian Brothers / Jan Hewett (final; silver medlists)
3. (England) Kenneth Tantum / Sue Awcock (semi-finals; bronze medlists)
4. (England) Jim Garrett / Mary Jenner (champion; gold medlists)

=== Group stage ===
==== Group A ====
Pos	Team	Pld	W	L	GF	GA	GD	PF	PA	PD	Qualification
1	(Denmark) Per Dabelsteen (Denmark) Irene Sterlie [1]	2	2	0	4	1	+3	95	76	+19	Qualification to elimination stage
2	(England) Michael John Cox (England) Linda Coombes	2	1	1	3	2	+1	89	85	+4	Qualification to elimination stage
3	(South Korea) Jung Kook-sam (South Korea) Won Young-ae (H)	2	0	2	0	4	−4	61	84	−23	

Source: Group A – standings
(H) Host

Date		Score		Game 1	Game 2	Game 3	Venue
Sep 11	Per Dabelsteen (Denmark); Irene Sterlie (Denmark)	2–0	(South Korea) Jung Kook-sam (South Korea) Won Young-ae	21–13	21–16		Jeonju Indoor Stadium
Sep 12	Michael John Cox (England); Linda Coombes (England)	2–0	(South Korea) Jung Kook-sam (South Korea) Won Young-ae	21–14	21–18		Hwasan Indoor Stadium
Sep 13	Per Dabelsteen (Denmark); Irene Sterlie (Denmark)	2–1	(England) Michael John Cox (England) Linda Coombes	11–21	21–12	21–14	Hwasan Indoor Stadium

==== Group B ====
Pos	Team	Pld	W	L	GF	GA	GD	PF	PA	PD	Qualification
1	(England) Ian Brothers (England) Jan Hewett [2]	2	2	0	4	0	+4	84	23	+61	Qualification to elimination stage
2	(South Korea) Shin Dong-soo (South Korea) Lee Pan-soon (H)	2	1	1	2	2	0	56	63	−7	Qualification to elimination stage
3	(India) Wazir Chand Goyal (India) Usha Sharma	2	0	2	0	4	−4	30	84	−54	

Source: Group B – standings
(H) Host

Date		Score		Game 1	Game 2	Game 3	Venue
Sep 12	Ian Brothers (England); Jan Hewett (England)	2–0	(South Korea) Shin Dong-soo (South Korea) Lee Pan-soon	21–9	21–5		Hwasan Indoor Stadium
Sep 13	Wazir Chand Goyal (India); Usha Sharma (India)	0–2	(South Korea) Shin Dong-soo (South Korea) Lee Pan-soon	12–21	9–21		Hwasan Indoor Stadium
Sep 14	Ian Brothers (England); Jan Hewett (England)	2–0	(India) Wazir Chand Goyal (India) Usha Sharma	21–2	21–7		Jeonju Indoor Stadium

==== Group C ====
Pos	Team	Pld	W	L	GF	GA	GD	PF	PA	PD	Qualification
1	(England) Kenneth Tantum (England) Sue Awcock [3/4]	3	3	0	6	1	+5	145	106	+39	Qualification to elimination stage
2	(Germany) Gerd Pflug (Germany) Elvira Richter	3	2	1	4	3	+1	136	133	+3	Qualification to elimination stage
3	(Japan) Hiroshi Yoshida (Japan) Hiromi Ayama	3	1	2	4	4	0	156	137	+19	
4	(India) Satish Dhondu Kudchadker (India) Gowramma Veeralinga	3	0	3	0	6	−6	65	126	−61	

Source: Group C – standings

Date		Score		Game 1	Game 2	Game 3	Venue
Sep 11	Satish Dhondu Kudchadker (India); Gowramma Veeralinga (India)	0–2	(Japan) Hiroshi Yoshida (Japan) Hiromi Ayama	6–21	6–21		Jeonju Indoor Stadium
Sep 11	Kenneth Tantum (England); Sue Awcock (England)	2–0	(Germany) Gerd Pflug (Germany) Elvira Richter	21–16	21–14		Jeonju Indoor Stadium
Sep 12	Kenneth Tantum (England); Sue Awcock (England)	2–1	(Japan) Hiroshi Yoshida (Japan) Hiromi Ayama	19–21	21–16	21–15	Hwasan Indoor Stadium
Sep 12	Satish Dhondu Kudchadker (India); Gowramma Veeralinga (India)	0–2	(Germany) Gerd Pflug (Germany) Elvira Richter	17–21	12–21		Hwasan Indoor Stadium
Sep 13	Kenneth Tantum (England); Sue Awcock (England)	2–0	(India) Satish Dhondu Kudchadker (India) Gowramma Veeralinga	21–10	21–14		Hwasan Indoor Stadium
Sep 13	Hiroshi Yoshida (Japan); Hiromi Ayama (Japan)	0–2	(Germany) Gerd Pflug (Germany) Elvira Richter	21–19	20–22	21–23	Hwasan Indoor Stadium

==== Group D ====
Pos	Team	Pld	W	L	GF	GA	GD	PF	PA	PD	Qualification
1	(England) Jim Garrett (England) Mary Jenner [3/4]	2	2	0	4	0	+4	84	46	+38	Qualification to elimination stage
2	(India) Bhami Reddy Karri (India) Sarada Devi Vedurlapalli	2	0	2	0	4	−4	31	84	−53	Qualification to elimination stage
3	(Japan) Masaki Furuhashi (Japan) Setsuko Yano	2	1	1	2	2	0	72	57	+15	
4	(South Korea) Shin Sang-soo (South Korea) Park Ei-soon (H, Z)	0	0	0	0	0	0	0	0	0	

Source: Group D – standings
(H) Host; (Z) Withdrew.

Date		Score		Game 1	Game 2	Game 3	Venue
Sep 12	Jim Garrett (England); Mary Jenner (England)	2–0	(Japan) Masaki Furuhashi (Japan) Setsuko Yano	21–13	21–17		Hwasan Indoor Stadium
Sep 13	Bhami Reddy Karri (India); Sarada Devi Vedurlapalli (India)	0–2	(Japan) Masaki Furuhashi (Japan) Setsuko Yano	9–21	6–21		Hwasan Indoor Stadium
Sep 14	Jim Garrett (England); Mary Jenner (England)	2–0	(India) Bhami Reddy Karri (India) Sarada Devi Vedurlapalli	21–4	21–12		Jeonju Indoor Stadium

=== Elimination stage ===
Quarter-finals
1	(Denmark) Per Dabelsteen (Denmark) Irene Sterlie	21	21
(England) Michael John Cox (England) Linda Coombes	15	15
3/4	(England) Jim Garrett (England) Mary Jenner	21	21
(Germany) Gerd Pflug (Germany) Elvira Richter	14	14
(Japan) Masaki Furuhashi (Japan) Setsuko Yano	17	15
3/4	(England) Kenneth Tantum (England) Sue Awcock	21	21
(South Korea) Shin Dong-soo (South Korea) Lee Pan-soon	6	5
2	(England) Ian Brothers (England) Jan Hewett	21	21

Semi-finals
1	(Denmark) Per Dabelsteen (Denmark) Irene Sterlie	13	10
3/4	(England) Jim Garrett (England) Mary Jenner	21	21
3/4	(England) Kenneth Tantum (England) Sue Awcock	21	17	15
2	(England) Ian Brothers (England) Jan Hewett	11	21	21

Final
3/4	(England) Jim Garrett (England) Mary Jenner	20	21	21
2	(England) Ian Brothers (England) Jan Hewett	22	14	9
