= Karel Mainaky =

Indonesian badminton player

Personal information
- Born: Karel Leopold Mainaky; 9 January 1977 (age 49) Ternate, North Maluku, Indonesia
- Height: 1.65 m (5 ft 5 in)
- Weight: 64 kg (141 lb)

Sport
- Country: Indonesia
- Sport: Badminton
- Handedness: Right
- Event: Men's doubles

Men's doubles
- BWF profile

Karel Leopold Mainaky (born 9 January 1977) is an Indonesian badminton player and coach. After his professional career as a player, he became a badminton coach specialized in coaching women's doubles. He is currently the Indonesia National team women's doubles head coach since January 2025.

Karel is the youngest member of the Mainaky brothers, a badminton family of which five brothers of the seven siblings were Indonesian badminton National athletes in the 1990s. Besides Karel, the Mainaky badminton brothers consist of Richard Leonard Mainaky, Rionny Frederik Lambertus Mainaky, Rexy Ronald Mainaky and Marleve Mario Mainaky. The five figures of the Mainaky brothers have carved out many achievements in the world of badminton, not only as active players but also as badminton coaches.

== Career ==
=== Early career and Junior titles ===
Mainaky was the youngest member of a badminton loving family, and he started playing badminton himself at the age of five years old. He was educated at the Kelapa Dua high school. As an Indonesian National junior player, 1995 was his most successful international year. He won the boys' doubles event with partner Eng Hian at both the German Junior International in Bottrop, Germany and the Dutch Junior International in Haarlem, the Netherlands.

=== Senior career and home titles ===
In 1997, Mainaky reached both the men's doubles semi-finals at home with Hadi Saputra at the Indonesia International in Jakarta and also with Nova Widianto at the Indonesia Open 1997 in Surakarta, a five-star IBF Grand Prix tournament with total prize money of US$200,000. In 1998, and in 2001, Mainaky won the Jakarta International event, in 1998 with Nova Widianto and in 2001 with Davis Efraim. In 2001, Mainaky reached the semi-finals of the Indonesian Open once again in Jakarta, this time with partner Davis Efraim. It was a four-star tournament of the 2001 IBF World Grand Prix circuit and the prize money of the event was US$150,000.

=== Coaching career ===
After retiring as a player, Mainaky coached the men's club team of Unysis in Japan. From 2011, he then coached Japan's women's club team Renesas, which also competed in the 2015 Djarum Superliga in Denpasar, Bali. Under his supervision, Renesas grew into one of Japan's top badminton teams.

From 2015, he was also coaching Japan's National B team, where he was instrumental in turning women's double Rin Iwanaga and Kie Nakanishi into an elite pair and their rise in the women's doubles world ranking. Same can also be said of the Japanese couple of Rena Miyaura and Ayako Sakuramoto.

On 20 December 2024, the PBSI announced that Mainaky was appointed as the new Head Coach of Women's Doubles in Indonesia together with Nitya Krishinda Maheswari appointed as the assistant Head Coach of the Women's Doubles team.

== Achievements as player ==
=== IBF International ===
Men's doubles
| Year | Tournament | Partner | Opponent | Score | Result | Ref. |
|---|---|---|---|---|---|---|
| 1998 | Jakarta International | (Indonesia) Nova Widianto | (Indonesia) Luluk Hadiyanto (Indonesia) Aras Razak | 15–11, 11–15, 15–11 | (gold) Winner | |
| 2001 | Jakarta International | (Indonesia) Davis Efraim | (Indonesia) Ade Lukas (Indonesia) Andreas Setiawan | 13–15, 15–11, 15–12 | (gold) Winner | |
