= Marleve Mainaky =

Indonesian badminton player

Personal information
- Born: Marleve Mario Mainaky; 26 March 1972 (age 54) Ternate, North Maluku, Indonesia
- Height: 1.78 m (5 ft 10 in)
- Weight: 60 kg (132 lb)

Sport
- Country: Indonesia
- Sport: Badminton
- Handedness: Right
- Event: Men's singles

Men's singles
- BWF profile
Medal record
Men's badminton
Representing Indonesia
World Masters Games
Silver medal – second place	2025 Taipei	Men's singles 50+
World Senior Championships
Gold medal – first place	2023 Jeonju	Men's singles 50+
Gold medal – first place	2023 Jeonju	Men's doubles 50+
Gold medal – first place	2025 Pattaya	Men's singles 50+
Silver medal – second place	2025 Pattaya	Men's doubles 50+
Thomas Cup
Gold medal – first place	1998 Hong Kong	Men's team
Gold medal – first place	2000 Kuala Lumpur	Men's team
Gold medal – first place	2002 Guangzhou	Men's team
Asian Games
Silver medal – second place	2002 Busan	Men's team
Asian Championships
Silver medal – second place	1998 Bangkok	Men's singles
Bronze medal – third place	1994 Shanghai	Men's singles
Bronze medal – third place	1999 Kuala Lumpur	Men's singles
Bronze medal – third place	2000 Jakarta	Men's singles
SEA Games
Silver medal – second place	2001 Kuala Lumpur	Men's team
Bronze medal – third place	2001 Kuala Lumpur	Men's singles

Marleve Mario Mainaky (born 26 March 1972) is an Indonesian badminton player and coach. He was part of the Indonesia men's team that won the Thomas Cup in 1998, 2000, and 2002. Mainaky had collected a silver and three bronzes at the Asian Championships. He competed at the 2000 Summer Olympics in Sydney, Australia, reaching into the quarterfinals. He was the men's singles bronze medalist at the 2001 SEA Games, also helped the men's team won the silver medal at that event, and 2002 Asian Games. After he retired from the international tournament circuit, he started his career as a badminton coach. Marleve Mainaky was the fifth of seven siblings of Jantje Rudolf Mainaky and Venna Hauvelman. Five of the siblings were also professional badminton players. Five of seven children in the Mainaky family, Marleve, Richard, Rexy, Rionny and Karel, were part of the Indonesian national shuttling team in the 1990s and nowadays they still have a hand in the sport, though courtside as badminton coaches.

== Personal life ==
Marleve Mainaky is married to former player from the Indonesian National team Hellen Paokie. The couple has three children all boys.

== Achievements ==
=== World Masters Games ===
Men's singles
Year	Age	Venue	Opponent	Score	Result	Ref.
2025	50+	Taipei Gymnasium; Taipei, Taiwan	(Japan) Hosemari Fujimoto	0–2	Silver	

=== World Senior Championships ===
Men's singles
Year	Age	Venue	Opponent	Score	Result	Ref.
2023	50+	Hwasan Indoor Stadium; Jeonju, South Korea	(England) Carl Jennings	21–11, 21–11	Gold	
2025	50+	Eastern National Sports Training Centre; Pattaya, Thailand	(Denmark) Gregers Schytt	21–15, 21–15	Gold	

Men's doubles
Year	Age	Venue	Partner	Opponent	Score	Result	Ref.
2023	50+	Hwasan Indoor Stadium; Jeonju, South Korea	(Indonesia) Hariyanto Arbi	(Thailand) Chatchai Boonmee (Thailand) Wittaya Panomchai	21–19, 21–16	Gold	
2025	50+	Eastern National Sports Training Centre; Pattaya, Thailand	(Indonesia) Hariyanto Arbi	(Indonesia) Adi Ariyadi (Indonesia) Eko Hamiseno	15–21, 17–21	Silver	

=== Asian Championships ===
Men's singles
Year	Venue	Opponent	Score	Result
1994	Shanghai Gymnasium, Shanghai, China	(Malaysia) Foo Kok Keong	6–15, 7–15	Bronze
1998	Bangkok, Thailand	(China) Chen Gang	6–15, 9–15	Silver
1999	Kuala Lumpur Badminton Stadium, Kuala Lumpur, Malaysia	(Malaysia) Ong Ewe Hock	3–15, 15–5, 7–15	Bronze
2000	Istora Senayan, Jakarta, Indonesia	(Indonesia) Rony Agustinus	10–15, 5–15	Bronze

=== SEA Games ===
Men's singles
Year	Venue	Opponent	Score	Result
2001	Malawati Stadium, Selangor, Malaysia	(Malaysia) Roslin Hashim	15–13, 11–15, 7–15	Bronze

=== IBF World Grand Prix (3 titles, 4 runners-up) ===
The World Badminton Grand Prix sanctioned by International Badminton Federation (IBF) since 1983.

Men's singles
Year	Tournament	Opponent	Score	Result
1993	U.S. Open	(Indonesia) Fung Permadi	15–8, 15–8	(gold) Winner
1997	Indonesia Open	(Indonesia) Ardy Wiranata	9–15, 3–15	(silver) Runner-up
1999	Swiss Open	(Chinese Taipei) Fung Permadi	13–15, 0–15	(silver) Runner-up
1999	World Grand Prix Finals	(Denmark) Peter Gade	11–15, 3–15	(silver) Runner-up
2000	World Grand Prix Finals	(China) Xia Xuanze	4–7, 5–7, 7–2, 6–8	(silver) Runner-up
2001	Indonesia Open	(Malaysia) Lee Tsuen Seng	6–8, 7–5, 7–3, 7–3	(gold) Winner
2002	Swiss Open	(Malaysia) James Chua	2–7, 7–5, 7–3, 6–8, 7–1	(gold) Winner

=== IBF International (2 titles, 3 runners-up) ===
Men's singles
Year	Tournament	Opponent	Score	Result
1993	Polish International	(Indonesia) Lioe Tiong Ping	15–8, 12–15, 1–15	(silver) Runner-up
1993	Amor International	(Scotland) Jim Mailer	15–5, 15–3	(gold) Winner
1995	Hamburg Cup	(Indonesia) George Rimarcdi	15–9, 7–15, 12–15	(silver) Runner-up
1997	Malaysia International	(Indonesia) G. Herry	15–9, 15–5	(gold) Winner
2004	Pakistan Satellite	(Indonesia) Jeffer Rosobin	4–15, 0–4 retired	(silver) Runner-up
