= Sørensen =

Sørensen (Danish pronunciation: [ˈsɶɐ̯ˀn̩sn̩]) is a Danish-Norwegian patronymic surname meaning "son of Søren" (given name equivalent of Severin). As of 2022, it is the eighth most common surname in Denmark. Immigrants to English-speaking countries often changed the spelling to Sorensen or Sorenson in order to accommodate English orthographic rules. English-language media often similarly renders Sørensen as either Sorensen or Sorenson. A parallel form of similar origin is Severinsen.

The numbers of bearers of the surnames Sørensen and Severinsen in Denmark and Norway (2008):

	Sørensen	Severinsen	source
Denmark	102848	1075	
Norway	10382	748	

It may refer to a number of people:

== People with the same name ==
- Ole Sørensen
- Peter Sørensen

== In sports ==
- Aksel Sørensen (1891–1955), Danish gymnast
- Andreas Sørensen (born 1984), Danish footballer
- Anders Sørensen (born 1962), Danish golfer
- Arne Sørensen (1917–1977), Danish footballer and manager
- Asger Sørensen (born 1996), Danish footballer
- Bjarne Sørensen, Danish cyclist
- Chris Sørensen (born 1977), Danish footballer
- Chris Anker Sørensen (1984–2021), Danish cyclist
- Dennis Sørensen (born 1981), Danish footballer
- Egon Sørensen (1913–1981), Danish football goalkeeper
- Erling Sørensen (1920–2002), Danish footballer
- Ernst Sørensen (chess player), Danish chess player
- Finn Willy Sørensen (1941–2019), Danish football player
- Frederik Sørensen (born 1992), Danish football player
- Hans Christian Sørensen (1900–1984), Danish gymnast
- Hans Olav Sørensen (born 1942), Norwegian ski jumper
- Hans Laurids Sørensen (1901–1974), Danish gymnast
- Harry Sørensen (1892–1963), Danish gymnast
- Henning Lund-Sørensen (born 1942), retired Danish footballer
- Inge Sørensen (1924–2011), Danish swimmer
- Jacob Sørensen (born 1983), Danish footballer
- Jan Sørensen (born 1955), Danish footballer
- Jan-Derek Sørensen (born 1971), Norwegian footballer
- Jens-Kristian Sørensen (born 1987), Danish footballer
- Jesper Sørensen (born 1973), Danish footballer
- Jørgen Leschly Sørensen (1922–1999), Danish footballer
- Jørn Sørensen (born 1936), Danish footballer
- Karina Sørensen (born 1980), Danish badminton player
- Karsten Sørensen (born 1948), Danish handball player
- Kenneth Sørensen (born 1982), Danish footballer
- Lars Sørensen (swimmer) (born 1968), Danish swimmer
- Mads Bech Sørensen (born 1999), Danish footballer
- Marinus Sørensen (1898–1965), Danish track and field athlete
- Mette Sørensen (born 1975), Danish badminton player
- Nicki Sørensen (born 1975), Danish cyclist
- Niels Holst-Sørensen (1922–2023), Danish athlete
- Odd Wang Sørensen (1922–2004), Norwegian footballer
- Ole Nørskov Sørensen (born 1952), Danish handball player
- Poul Sørensen (1906–1951), Danish cyclist
- Poul Sørensen (born 1954), Danish handball player
- Rolf Sørensen (born 1965), Danish cyclist
- Søren Sørensen (1897–1965), Danish gymnast
- Thomas Sørensen (born 1976), Danish football goalkeeper
- Tommy Sørensen (born 1979), Danish badminton player

== In the arts ==
- Bent Sørensen (born 1958), Danish composer
- Birgitte Hjort Sørensen (born 1982), Danish actress
- Birte Tove Sørensen (1945–2016), birth name of Birte Tove, Danish actress and nude model
- Carl Theodor Sørensen (1893–1979), Danish landscape architect
- Sisters Heidi and Line Sørensen, members of Danish pop group S.O.A.P.
- Ingeborg Sørensen (born 1948), Norwegian model
- Per Øystein Sørensen (born 1961), musician
- Sigurd Torbjørn Sørensen (1901–1981), Norwegian artist
- Svend-Allan Sørensen (born 1975), Danish artist
- Villy Sørensen (1929–2001), Danish author

== In politics ==
- Edvard Sørensen (1893–1954), Danish politician
- Enevold Frederik Adolf Sørensen (1850–1920), Danish editor and politician
- Frode Sørensen (born 1946), Danish politician
- Hans Peter Sørensen (1886–1962), Danish politician
- Heidi Sørensen (1970–2026), Norwegian politician
- Olaf Sørensen (1892–1962), Norwegian politician
- Ronald Sørensen (born 1947), Dutch politician (Norwegian descent)

== In other media ==
- Elsa Sørensen (1934–2016), Danish model
- Jan Vang Sørensen (born c. 1960), previously named Jan Vang Hansen, Danish poker player
- Palle Sørensen (1927–2018), Danish criminal

== In military ==
- Niels Holst-Sørensen (1922–2023), commander-in-chief of the Royal Danish Air Force

== In science ==
- Bent Erik Sørensen (born 1941), Danish physicist and researcher into renewable energy
- Jørgine Stene Sørensen (1905–1997), Norwegian chemist
- Søren Sørensen (chemist) (1868–1939), Danish biochemist
- Thorvald Sørensen (1902–1973), Danish botanist

== People with Sørensen in their name ==
- Anders Sørensen Vedel (1542–1616), Danish priest and historian
- Christen Sørensen Longomontanus (1562–1647), Danish astronomer
- Peter Sørensen Vig (1854–1929), Danish-American pastor

== Severinsen ==
- Doc Severinsen (born 1927), American pop and jazz trumpeter
- Al Severinsen (1944–2015), American baseball player

== See also ==
- Sorensen
