= 2021 BWF World Senior Championships – 40+ =

Tournament details
- Dates: 28 November 2021 – 4 December 2021
- Edition: 10
- Level: International
- Nations: 24
- Venue: Palacio de los Deportes Carolina Marín
- Location: Huelva, Spain

Champions
- Men's singles: (Denmark) Casper Lund
- Women's singles: (Germany) Claudia Vogelgsang
- Men's doubles: (Denmark) Tommy Sørensen (Denmark) Jesper Thomsen
- Women's doubles: (Iceland) Drífa Harðardóttir (Iceland) Elsa Nielsen
- Mixed doubles: (Denmark) Jesper Thomsen (Iceland) Drífa Harðardóttir

These are the results of 2021 BWF World Senior Championships' 40+ events.

== Men's singles ==
1. (Switzerland) Oliver Colin (fourth round)
2. (Switzerland) Conrad Hückstädt (quarter-finals)
3. (Thailand) Naruenart Chuaymak (bronze medalist)
4. (Denmark) Morten Eilby Rasmussen (fourth round)
5. (Sweden) Marcus Jansson (fourth round)
6. (England) Alex Marritt (silver medalist)
7. (Germany) Björn Wippich (third round)
8. (Denmark) Casper Lund (gold medalist)
9. (Finland) Juuso Atrila (fourth round)
10. (India) Abhinn Shyam Gupta (quarter-finals)
11. (Indonesia) Jhony Hidayat (fourth Round)
12. (Poland) Dawid Krawiec (third round)
13. (Iceland) Tryggvi Nielsen (second round)
14. (France) Eric Wasylyk (quarter-finals)
15. (Sweden) Fredrik du Hane (withdrew)
16. (Finland) Antti Koljonen (fourth round)

=== Finals ===
Quarter-finals
9/16 | (India) Abhinn Shyam Gupta | 15 | 18
5/8 | (Denmark) Casper Lund | 21 | 21
3/4 | (Thailand) Naruenart Chuaymak | 21 | 21
9/16 | (France) Eric Wasylyk | 13 | 17
(France) Mathieu Seignez | 18 | 17
(Bulgaria) Tihomir Kirov | 21 | 21
5/8 | (England) Alex Marritt | 21 | 21
2 | (Switzerland) Conrad Hückstädt | 14 | 18

Semi-finals
5/8 | (Denmark) Casper Lund | 21 | 21
3/4 | (Thailand) Naruenart Chuaymak | 14 | 14
(Bulgaria) Tihomir Kirov | 9 | 9
5/8 | (England) Alex Marritt | 21 | 21

Final
5/8 | (Denmark) Casper Lund | 21 | 21
5/8 | (England) Alex Marritt | 19 | 17

=== Top half ===
==== Section 1 ====
First round

Second round
1 | (Switzerland) O Colin | 21 | 21
(Poland) A Szymczak | 5 | 10
(Sweden) B Sidfalk | 21 | 21
(Spain) J Romero | 14 | 4
9/16 | (India) A S Gupta | 21 | 21
(Germany) P Histel | 13 | 15
(France) B Lewis | 21 | 21
(Sri Lanka) M Perera | 10 | 5

Third round
1 | (Switzerland) O Colin | 21 | 21
(Sweden) B Sidfalk | 14 | 7
9/16 | (India) A S Gupta | 21 | 21
(France) B Lewis | 12 | 14

Fourth round
1 | (Switzerland) O Colin | 19 | 21 | 18
9/16 | (India) A S Gupta | 21 | 19 | 21

==== Section 2 ====
First round
(England) P Troke | 21 | 15 | 19
(Sweden) T Bäckström | 16 | 21 | 21

Second round
5/8 | (Denmark) C Lund | 21 | 21
(France) S Coto | 6 | 6
(Spain) F Gil | w | / | o
(Finland) T Kemppinen
9/16 | (Indonesia) J Hidayat | 21 | 21
(Portugal) G Pereira | 9 | 11
(Germany) T Kunkel | 21 | 21
(Sweden) T Bäckström | 19 | 17

Third round
5/8 | (Denmark) C Lund | 21 | 21
(Spain) F Gil | 8 | 11
9/16 | (Indonesia) J Hidayat | 19 | 21 | 21
(Germany) T Kunkel | 21 | 6 | 17

Fourth round
5/8 | (Denmark) C Lund | 21 | 21
9/16 | (Indonesia) J Hidayat | 16 | 15

==== Section 3 ====
First round
(Spain) J Martínez | w | / | o
(India) K Makwana

Second round
3/4 | (Thailand) N Chuaymak | 21 | 21
(Switzerland) A Neuweiler | 6 | 8
(France) T Lefauconnier | 21 | 21
(Latvia) V Liepkalns | 9 | 13
9/16 | (Finland) A Koljonen | 21 | 21
(Czech Republic) D Skrčený | 13 | 12
(Germany) M Hillbrandt | 21 | 16 | 21
(Spain) J Martínez | 14 | 21 | 15

Third round
3/4 | (Thailand) N Chuaymak | 21 | 21
(France) T Lefauconnier | 10 | 9
9/16 | (Finland) A Koljonen | 19 | 21 | 21
(Germany) M Hillbrandt | 21 | 11 | 5

Fourth round
3/4 | (Thailand) N Chuaymak | 21 | 21
9/16 | (Finland) A Koljonen | 7 | 9

==== Section 4 ====
First round
(England) P Freeman | 21 | 21
(Spain) F J Marta | 11 | 19

Second round
5/8 | (Sweden) M Jansson | 23 | 23 | 21
(India) K. R. Shivakumar | 25 | 21 | 8
(Sri Lanka) D de Silva | 12 | 7
(Poland) M Suski | 21 | 21
9/16 | (France) E Wasylyk | 21 | 21
(Germany) M Schwed | 9 | 5
(Netherlands) E Tan | 25 | 12 | 22
(England) P Freeman | 23 | 21 | 20

Third round
5/8 | (Sweden) M Jansson | 21 | 21
(Poland) M Suski | 14 | 13
9/16 | (France) E Wasylyk | 21 | 21
(Netherlands) E Tan | 9 | 10

Fourth round
5/8 | (Sweden) M Jansson | 19 | 14
9/16 | (France) E Wasylyk | 21 | 21

=== Bottom half ===
==== Section 5 ====
First round
(Spain) E Marco | 21 | 21
(Ukraine) M Postol | 7 | 11

Second round
(Spain) E Marco | 21 | 21
(Latvia) M Kažemaks | 15 | 16
(Italy) J Vedagiri | 11 | 9
9/16 | (Poland) D Krawiec | 21 | 21
(France) M Seignez | 21 | 21
(England) T Grandison | 7 | 12
(Switzerland) D Purushothaman | 8 | 14
5/8 | (Germany) B Wippich | 21 | 21

Third round
(Spain) E Marco | 21 | 21
9/16 | (Poland) D Krawiec | 14 | 14
(France) M Seignez | 26 | 21
5/8 | (Germany) B Wippich | 24 | 15

Fourth round
(Spain) E Marco | 10 | 16
(France) M Seignez | 21 | 21

==== Section 6 ====
First round
(England) A Overy | w | / | o
(India) N Veeraswamy

Second round
(England) A Overy | 11 | 5
(France) P-A Avallet | 21 | 21
(Bulgaria) T Kirov | w | / | o
9/16 | (Sweden) F du Hane
(Switzerland) J Scheffler | 19 | 18
(Germany) F Körber | 21 | 21
(Spain) C Fernandez | 12 | 8
3/4 | (Denmark) M E Rasmussen | 21 | 21

Third round
(France) P-A Avallet | 21 | 17 | 19
(Bulgaria) T Kirov | 17 | 21 | 21
(Germany) F Körber | 17 | 5
3/4 | (Denmark) M E Rasmussen | 21 | 21

Fourth round
(Bulgaria) T Kirov | 17 | 21 | 21
3/4 | (Denmark) M E Rasmussen | 21 | 15 | 18

==== Section 7 ====
First round
(Czech Republic) M Šimo | 21 | 21
(Portugal) P Oliveira | 3 | 5

Second round
(Czech Republic) M Šimo | 21 | 12 | 17
(Germany) F Dietrich | 16 | 21 | 21
(France) J Fuchs | 21 | 21
9/16 | (Iceland) T Nielsen | 11 | 10
(Spain) P Picazo | 8 | 12
(India) A Sharma | 21 | 21
(Sri Lanka) D Nilushana Kithbewla Arachchi | 13 | 3
5/8 | (England) A Marritt | 21 | 21

Third round
(Germany) F Dietrich | 11 | 8
(France) J Fuchs | 21 | 21
(India) A Sharma | 17 | 13
5/8 | (England) A Marritt | 21 | 21

Fourth round
(France) J Fuchs | 18 | 13
5/8 | (England) A Marritt | 21 | 21

==== Section 8 ====
First round
SUB | (France) J Vienne | 21 | 15 | 21
(Poland) B Grabowski | 15 | 21 | 6

Second round
SUB | (France) J Vienne | 21 | 19 | 16
(Germany) S F Firth | 8 | 21 | 21
(Spain) D Ramal | 13 | 10
9/16 | (Finland) J Atrila | 21 | 21
(India) R Singh | 25 | 21 | 21
(Latvia) I Kelmers | 27 | 18 | 17
(Sweden) A Muth | 5 | 5
2 | (Switzerland) C Hückstädt | 21 | 21

Third round
(Germany) S F Firth | 9 | 19
9/16 | (Finland) J Atrila | 21 | 21
(India) R Singh | 8 | 5
2 | (Switzerland) C Hückstädt | 21 | 21

Fourth round
9/16 | (Finland) J Atrila | 7 | 2
2 | (Switzerland) C Hückstädt | 21 | 21

== Women's singles ==
=== Seeds ===
1. (Germany) Claudia Vogelgsang (gold medalist)
2. (Sweden) Katja Wengberg (quarter-finals)
3. (Poland) Dominika Guzik-Płuchowska (bronze medalist)
4. (Germany) Stefanie Schmidt (bronze medalist)
5. (France) Stephanie Cloarec (silver medalist)
6. (India) Pooja Mehta (quarter-finals)
7. (Denmark) Ulla Pedersen (third round)
8. (Sweden) Cecilia Närfors (third round)

=== Finals ===
Semi-finals
1 | (Germany) Claudia Vogelgsang | 21 | 7 | 21
3/4 | (Poland) Dominika Guzik-Płuchowska | 16 | 21 | 16
3/4 | (Germany) Stefanie Schmidt | 15 | 12
5/8 | (France) Stephanie Cloarec | 21 | 21

Final
1 | (Germany) Claudia Vogelgsang | 21 | 21
5/8 | (France) Stephanie Cloarec | 12 | 14

=== Top half ===
==== Section 1 ====
First round

Second round
1 | (Germany) C Vogelgsang | 21 | 21
(Spain) R Arcas | 0 | 4
(Finland) M Ramstedt | 21 | 21
(Latvia) I Galviņa | 8 | 15
5/8 | (India) P Mehta | 21 | 21
(Sweden) L Häggman | 13 | 14
(France) S Roland | 17 | 21 | 17
(Spain) B Foj | 21 | 18 | 21

Third round
1 | (Germany) C Vogelgsang | 21 | 21
(Finland) M Ramstedt | 6 | 3
5/8 | (India) P Mehta | 21 | 21
(Spain) B Foj | 4 | 5

Quarter-finals
1 | (Germany) C Vogelgsang | 21 | 21
5/8 | (India) P Mehta | 14 | 9

==== Section 2 ====
First round
(Estonia) K Eiche | 15 | 21 | 14
(Denmark) H Kæmpegaard | 21 | 13 | 21

Second round
3/4 | (Poland) D Guzik-Płuchowska | 21 | 21
(Netherlands) S Rolobessy | 13 | 7
(Germany) K Kubitza | 8 | 12
(Spain) D Abouzeid | 21 | 21
5/8 | (Sweden) C Närfors | w | / | o
(India) F Daniel
(France) A-S Guenet | 14 | 12
(Denmark) H Kæmpegaard | 21 | 21

Third round
3/4 | (Poland) D Guzik-Płuchowska | 21 | 21
(Spain) D Abouzeid | 6 | 14
5/8 | (Sweden) C Närfors | 4^{r}
(Denmark) H Kæmpegaard | 2

Quarter-finals
3/4 | (Poland) D Guzik-Płuchowska | 21 | 21
(Denmark) H Kæmpegaard | 8 | 8

=== Bottom half ===
==== Section 3 ====
First round
(Spain) J Loriot | 13 | 18
(India) S Kampapurmath | 21 | 21

Second round
(India) S Kampapurmath | 14 | 8
(Estonia) A Linnamiagi-Elmanova | 21 | 21
(Ukraine) N Shpak | 12 | 9
5/8 | (Denmark) U Pedersen | 21 | 21
(India) Shobha A.R.
(Spain) V Serrano | w | / | o
(Sweden) N Azadi | 8 | 7
3/4 | (Germany) S Schmidt | 21 | 21

Third round
(Estonia) A Linnamiagi-Elmanova | 21 | 21
5/8 | (Denmark) U Pedersen | 9 | 15
(Spain) V Serrano | 6 | 12
3/4 | (Germany) S Schmidt | 21 | 21

Quarter-finals
(Estonia) A Linnamiagi-Elmanova | 21 | 12 | 15
3/4 | (Germany) S Schmidt | 15 | 21 | 21

==== Section 4 ====
First round

Second round
(Switzerland) R Trottmann | 19 | 2^{r}
(Poland) M Kojder | 21 | 2
(Spain) C M Martínez | 5 | 4
5/8 | (France) S Cloarec | 21 | 21
(Norway) C Aase | 21 | 16 | 18
(Germany) S Fröhlich | 11 | 21 | 21
(India) Y Puri | 6 | 12
2 | (Sweden) K Wengberg | 21 | 21

Third round
(Poland) M Kojder | 10 | 4
5/8 | (France) S Cloarec | 21 | 21
(Germany) S Fröhlich | 7 | 11
2 | (Sweden) K Wengberg | 21 | 21

Quarter-finals
5/8 | (France) S Cloarec | 18 | 21 | 21
2 | (Sweden) K Wengberg | 21 | 10 | 15

== Men's doubles ==
=== Seeds ===
1. (Denmark) Tommy Sørensen / Jesper Thomsen (gold medalists)
2. (Denmark) Esben B. Kæmpegaard / Morten Eilby Rasmussen (third round)
3. (India) Samir Abbasi / Upendra Fadnis (bronze medalists)
4. (Sweden) Marcus Jansson / Björn Sidfalk (quarter-finals)
5. (England) Mark Constable / Alex Marritt (quarter-finals)
6. (Bulgaria) Tihomir Kirov / Plamen Mihalev (quarter-finals)
7. (Germany) Florian Körber / Björn Wippich (third round)
8. (Switzerland) Oliver Colin / (France) Eric Wasylyk (third round)

=== Finals ===
Semi-finals
1 | (Denmark) Tommy Sørensen (Denmark) Jesper Thomsen | 21 | 21
3/4 | (India) Samir Abbasi (India) Upendra Fadnis | 7 | 9
(India) Abhinand K. Shetty (India) Sunil Gladson Varadaraj | 10 | 14
(India) J. B. S. Vidyadhar (India) Ajit B. Umrani | 21 | 21

Final
1 | (Denmark) Tommy Sørensen (Denmark) Jesper Thomsen | 21 | 21
(India) J. B. S. Vidyadhar (India) Ajit B. Umrani | 13 | 18

=== Top half ===
==== Section 1 ====
First round
(Bulgaria) E Andreev (Bulgaria) M Chavdarov | 8 | 15
(India) J Kohli (India) A Sharma | 21 | 21
(Latvia) M Kažemaks (Latvia) V Liepkalns | 15 | 19
(France) M Seignez (France) J Vienne | 21 | 21

Second round
1 | (Denmark) T Sørensen (Denmark) J Thomsen | 21 | 21
(Sri Lanka) D Nilushana Kithbewla Arachchi (Sri Lanka) S Wickramasinghe | 2 | 5
(Poland) D Krawiec (Poland) M Suski | 13 | 18
(India) J Kohli (India) A Sharma | 21 | 21
5/8 | (England) M Constable (England) A Marritt | 21 | 21
(Spain) I Gallardo (Spain) H Tobar | 7 | 8
(India) J Singh (India) R Singh | 20 | 11^{r}
(France) M Seignez (France) J Vienne | 22 | 16

Third round
1 | (Denmark) T Sørensen (Denmark) J Thomsen | 21 | 21
(India) J Kohli (India) A Sharma | 16 | 10
5/8 | (England) M Constable (England) A Marritt | 21 | 21
(France) M Seignez (France) J Vienne | 14 | 12

Quarter-finals
1 | (Denmark) T Sørensen (Denmark) J Thomsen | 21 | 16 | 21
5/8 | (England) M Constable (England) A Marritt | 5 | 21 | 13

==== Section 2 ====
First round
(France) P Gouva (France) R You | 21 | 21
(Spain) B Albores (Spain) F J Rey | 12 | 7
(Germany) F Dietrich (Germany) S F Firth | 21 | 23
(India) A Kakkar (India) K V Vernekar | 16 | 21

Second round
3/4 | (India) S Abbasi (India) U Fadnis | 21 | 21
(Czech Republic) J Port (Czech Republic) M Šimo | 5 | 10
(Sweden) T Bäckström (Sweden) A Muth | 21 | 21
(France) P Gouva (France) R You | 17 | 16
5/8 | (Switzerland) O Colin (France) E Wasylyk | 21 | 21
(England) D Brown (England) A Overy | 5 | 6
(Spain) M Berrocal (Spain) A Brao | 9 | 8
(Germany) F Dietrich (Germany) S F Firth | 21 | 21

Third round
3/4 | (India) S Abbasi (India) U Fadnis | 21 | 21
(Sweden) T Bäckström (Sweden) A Muth | 16 | 11
5/8 | (Switzerland) O Colin (France) E Wasylyk | 20 | 21 | 17
(Germany) F Dietrich (Germany) S F Firth | 22 | 18 | 21

Quarter-finals
3/4 | (India) S Abbasi (India) U Fadnis | 21 | 25
(Germany) F Dietrich (Germany) S F Firth | 15 | 23

=== Bottom half ===
==== Section 3 ====
First round
(Finland) J Atrila (Finland) A Koljonen | 21 | 21
(Spain) D Ramal (Spain) J A Verdú | 14 | 13
(India) A K. Shetty (India) S G Varadaraj | 21 | 21
(Czech Republic) D Skrčený (Czech Republic) V Vlk | 15 | 14

Second round
(Finland) J Atrila (Finland) A Koljonen | 21 | 13 | 22
(France) B Deléris (France) J-J Nguyen | 13 | 21 | 20
(India) K Kanji (India) S Kanji | 11 | 20
5/8 | (Bulgaria) T Kirov (Bulgaria) P Mihalev | 21 | 22
(India) A K. Shetty (India) S G Varadaraj | 21 | 21
(Spain) Á Martínez (Spain) S Martínez | 15 | 2
(England) P Freeman (England) P Troke | 9 | 22
3/4 | (Sweden) M Jansson (Sweden) B Sidfalk | 21 | 24

Third round
(Finland) J Atrila (Finland) A Koljonen | 12 | 12
5/8 | (Bulgaria) T Kirov (Bulgaria) P Mihalev | 21 | 21
(India) A K. Shetty (India) S G Varadaraj | 21 | 21
3/4 | (Sweden) M Jansson (Sweden) B Sidfalk | 11 | 12

Quarter-finals
5/8 | (Bulgaria) T Kirov (Bulgaria) P Mihalev | 11 | 13
(India) A K. Shetty (India) S G Varadaraj | 21 | 21

==== Section 4 ====
First round
(France) S Coto (France) J Fuchs | 21 | 21
(Spain) P Picazo (Spain) J D Trujillo | 10 | 7
(Spain) E Marco (Spain) F J Marta | 21 | 21
(England) T Grandison (England) K Nirmalan | 11 | 12

Second round
(France) S Coto (France) J Fuchs | 21 | 21
(Italy) T Stan (Italy) J Vedagiri | 6 | 7
(Sri Lanka) D de Silva (Sri Lanka) M Perera | 14 | 8
5/8 | (Germany) F Körber (Germany) B Wippich | 21 | 21
(Spain) E Marco (Spain) F J Marta | 10 | 11
(India) J. B. S. Vidyadhar (India) A B. Umrani | 21 | 21
(Portugal) G Pereira (Switzerland) D Purushothaman | 8 | 11
2 | (Denmark) E B. Kæmpegaard (Denmark) M E Rasmussen | 21 | 21

Third round
(France) S Coto (France) J Fuchs | 21 | 22
5/8 | (Germany) F Körber (Germany) B Wippich | 19 | 20
(India) J. B. S. Vidyadhar (India) A B. Umrani | 21 | 21
2 | (Denmark) E B. Kæmpegaard (Denmark) M E Rasmussen | 14 | 13

Quarter-finals
(France) S Coto (France) J Fuchs | 17 | 19
(India) J. B. S. Vidyadhar (India) A B. Umrani | 21 | 21

== Women's doubles ==
=== Seeds ===
1. (Iceland) Drífa Harðardóttir / Elsa Nielsen ( medalists)
2. (Germany) Claudia Vogelgsang / (Sweden) Katja Wengberg (bronze medalists)
3. (England) Mhairi Armstrong / Suzanne Brewer (bronze medalists)
4. (England) Sarah Burgess / Claire Royall (second round)

=== Finals ===
Semi-finals
1 | (Iceland) Drífa Harðardóttir (Iceland) Elsa Nielsen | 21 | 21
3/4 | (England) Mhairi Armstrong (England) Suzanne Brewer | 9 | 14
(South Korea) An Dong-sun (South Korea) Kim Eun-sil | 13 | 23 | 21
2 | (Germany) Claudia Vogelgsang (Sweden) Katja Wengberg | 21 | 21 | 18

Final
1 | (Iceland) Drífa Harðardóttir (Iceland) Elsa Nielsen | 23 | 21
(South Korea) An Dong-sun (South Korea) Kim Eun-sil | 21 | 8

=== Top half ===
==== Section 1 ====
First round
(Norway) C Aase (Sweden) N Azadi | 15 | 10
(Estonia) K Eiche (Estonia) A Linnamiagi-Elmanova | 21 | 21
(Sweden) L Häggman (Sweden) C Närfors | 21 | 21
(Spain) D Abouzeid (Spain) E Sanz | 9 | 7

Second round
1 | (Iceland) D Harðardóttir (Iceland) E Nielsen | 21 | 19 | 21
(Estonia) K Eiche (Estonia) A Linnamiagi-Elmanova | 18 | 21 | 13
(India) S Kampapurmath (India) N G Santhanam | 9 | 12
(Sweden) L Häggman (Sweden) C Närfors | 21 | 21

Quarter-finals
1 | (Iceland) D Harðardóttir (Iceland) E Nielsen | 21 | 21
(Sweden) L Häggman (Sweden) C Närfors | 7 | 7

==== Section 2 ====
First round
(Spain) M Ferreira (Spain) C Lamas | 19 | 20
(Germany) P Schlüter (Sweden) P Wareechol | 21 | 22
(Germany) K Kubitza (Germany) S Pietz | 20 | 21 | 17
(France) A-S Guenet (France) S Roland | 22 | 17 | 21
(Finland) E Heikkinen (Finland) M Ramstedt | 21 | 21
(India) P Ladon (India) Y Taw | 8 | 6

Second round
3/4 | (England) M Armstrong (England) S Brewer | 21 | 21
(Germany) P Schlüter (Sweden) P Wareechol | 14 | 14
(France) A-S Guenet (France) S Roland | 8 | 15
(Finland) E Heikkinen (Finland) M Ramstedt | 21 | 21

Quarter-finals
3/4 | (England) M Armstrong (England) S Brewer | 18 | 22 | 21
(Finland) E Heikkinen (Finland) M Ramstedt | 21 | 20 | 13

=== Bottom half ===
==== Section 3 ====
First round
(Switzerland) M-C Beaudoin-Ekstrand (Switzerland) R Trottmann
(Sweden) E Lindqvist (Netherlands) S Rolobessy | w | / | o
(Poland) D Guzik-Płuchowska (Poland) M Kojder | 21 | 21
(England) K Fairey (Denmark) U Pedersen | 18 | 14
(South Korea) An D-s (South Korea) Kim E-s | 21 | 21
(India) R Bhandari (India) H Punia Sharma | 5 | 5

Second round
(Sweden) E Lindqvist (Netherlands) S Rolobessy | 8 | 11
(Poland) D Guzik-Płuchowska (Poland) M Kojder | 21 | 21
(South Korea) An D-s (South Korea) Kim E-s | 21 | 21
3/4 | (England) S Burgess (England) C Royall | 16 | 17

Quarter-finals
(Poland) D Guzik-Płuchowska (Poland) M Kojder | 19 | 18
(South Korea) An D-s (South Korea) Kim E-s | 21 | 21

==== Section 4 ====
First round
(Latvia) I Galviņna (Ukraine) Y Nogina | 5 | 3
(Sweden) T Karlsson (Germany) J Willems | 21 | 21
(India) Y Puri (India) P Sangani | 4 | 8
(Germany) T Kähler (Germany) S Schmidt | 21 | 21
(France) S Cloarec (Ukraine) O Shutenko | 21 | 21
(Spain) J Loriot (Spain) B Martín | 5 | 3

Second round
(Sweden) T Karlsson (Germany) J Willems | 19 | 15
(Germany) T Kähler (Germany) S Schmidt | 21 | 21
(France) S Cloarec (Ukraine) O Shutenko | 21 | 14 | 9
2 | (Germany) C Vogelgsang (Sweden) K Wengberg | 17 | 21 | 21

Quarter-finals
(Germany) T Kähler (Germany) S Schmidt | 24 | 19 | 12
2 | (Germany) C Vogelgsang (Sweden) K Wengberg | 22 | 21 | 21

== Mixed doubles ==
=== Seeds ===
1. (England) Alex Marritt / Rebecca Pantaney (silver medalists)
2. (England) Mark King / Mhairi Armstrong (third round)
3. (Denmark) Esben B. Kæmpegaard / Helle Kæmpegaard (quarter-finals)
4. (Denmark) Morten Eilby Rasmussen / (Germany) Claudia Vogelgsang (bronze medalists)
5. (Sweden) Stefan Edvardsson / Katja Wengberg (third round)
6. (Germany) Björn Wippich / Jessica Willems (second round)
7. (England) Mark Constable / Lynne Swan (bronze medalists)
8. (England) Paul Freeman / Sarah Burgess (second round)

=== Finals ===
Semi-finals
1 | (England) Alex Marritt (England) Rebecca Pantaney | 21 | 21
3/4 | (Denmark) Morten Eilby Rasmussen (Germany) Claudia Vogelgsang | 14 | 16
5/8 | (England) Mark Constable (England) Lynne Swan | 11 | 9
(Denmark) Jesper Thomsen (Iceland) Drífa Harðardottír | 21 | 21

Final
1 | (England) Alex Marritt (England) Rebecca Pantaney | 19 | 10
(Denmark) Jesper Thomsen (Iceland) Drífa Harðardottír | 21 | 21

=== Top half ===
==== Section 1 ====
First round
(Switzerland) S Knöpfli (Switzerland) R Trottmann | 21 | 21
(Spain) S Martínez (Spain) B Martín | 17 | 14
SUB | (Sri Lanka) D Nilushana Kithbewla Arachchi (Finland) M Ramstedt | 13 | 21 | 10
(India) S Velan (India) B Baruah | 21 | 13 | 21
(Netherlands) E Tan (Sweden) L Häggman | 15 | 8
(Sweden) B Sidfalk (Sweden) C Närfors | 21 | 21
(France) B Deléris (France) S Ronald | 21 | 21
(Spain) I Gallardo (Spain) M J Almagro | 18 | 16

Second round
1 | (England) A Marritt (England) R Pantaney | 21 | 21
(Switzerland) S Knöpfli (Switzerland) R Trottmann | 7 | 4
(Czech Republic) M Šimo (Sweden) P Wareechol | 17 | 11
(India) S Velan (India) B Baruah | 21 | 21
5/8 | (Germany) B Wippich (Germany) J Willems | 12 | 16
(Sweden) B Sidfalk (Sweden) C Närfors | 21 | 21
(India) K Kanuji (India) S R Lamb | 17 | 19
(France) B Deléris (France) S Ronald | 21 | 21

Third round
1 | (England) A Marritt (England) R Pantaney | w | / | o
(India) S Velan (India) B Baruah
(Sweden) B Sidfalk (Sweden) C Närfors | 21 | 21
(France) B Deléris (France) S Ronald | 12 | 12

Quarter-finals
1 | (England) A Marritt (England) R Pantaney | 21 | 21
(Sweden) B Sidfalk (Sweden) C Närfors | 8 | 11

==== Section 2 ====
First round
(France) E Wasylyk (France) S Cloarec | 21 | 21
(Germany) M Schwed (Germany) S Fröhlich | 19 | 6
(Ukraine) M Postol (Ukraine) N Shpak | 21 | 16 | 11
(India) R Kaushik (India) S Kampapurmath | 14 | 21 | 21
(India) S Abbasi (India) P Mehta | 21 | 21
(Spain) G López (Spain) M J Mompó | 16 | 4
(Poland) K Walenda (Poland) D Guzik-Płuchowska | 11 | 21 | 18
(Germany) F Körber (Germany) T Kähler | 21 | 15 | 21

Second round
3/4 | (Denmark) M E Rasmussen (Germany) C Vogelgsang | 21 | 21
(France) E Wasylyk (France) S Cloarec | 12 | 13
(Spain) F Herrero (Spain) V Serrano | 20 | 8
(India) R Kaushik (India) S Kampapurmath | 22 | 21
5/8 | (England) P Freeman (England) S Burgess | 16 | 22 | 21
(India) S Abbasi (India) P Mehta | 21 | 20 | 21
(Sweden) R Magnusson (Sweden) N Azadi | 8 | 11
(Germany) F Körber (Germany) T Kähler | 21 | 21

Third round
3/4 | (Denmark) M E Rasmussen (Germany) C Vogelgsang | 21 | 21
(India) R Kaushik (India) S Kampapurmath | 10 | 12
(India) S Abbasi (India) P Mehta | 21 | 21
(Germany) F Körber (Germany) T Kähler | 16 | 16

Quarter-finals
3/4 | (Denmark) M E Rasmussen (Germany) C Vogelgsang | 21 | 21
(India) S Abbasi (India) P Mehta | 17 | 18

=== Bottom half ===
==== Section 3 ====
First round
(Netherlands) M Gouw (Netherlands) S Rolobessy | 12 | 15
(France) S Coto (Ukraine) O Shutenko | 21 | 21
(Germany) S F Firth (Germany) S Wigger | 12 | 8
(India) A B. Umrani (India) P Joshi | 21 | 21
(Spain) E Marco (Spain) B Foj | 13 | 18
(France) M Seignez (France) A-S Guenet | 21 | 21
(Estonia) T Talts (Estonia) K Eiche | 21 | 21
(Iceland) T Nielsen (Denmark) U Pedersen | 18 | 14
(Poland) D Krawiec (Poland) M Kojder | 21 | 21
(Spain) Á Martínez (Spain) G Cardigonde | 12 | 12

Second round
(France) S Coto (Ukraine) O Shutenko | 16 | 21 | 21
(India) A B. Umrani (India) P Joshi | 21 | 14 | 19
(France) M Seignez (France) A-S Guenet | 12 | 23
5/8 | (England) M Constable (England) L Swan | 21 | 25
(Estonia) T Talts (Estonia) K Eiche | 21 | 21
(Germany) N Denzer (Germany) K Kubitza | 18 | 15
(Poland) D Krawiec (Poland) M Kojder | 12 | 21 | 16
3/4 | (Denmark) E B. Kæmpegaard (Denmark) H Kæmpegaard | 21 | 18 | 21

Third round
(France) S Coto (Ukraine) O Shutenko | 20 | 19
5/8 | (England) M Constable (England) L Swan | 22 | 21
(Estonia) T Talts (Estonia) K Eiche | 24 | 19
3/4 | (Denmark) E B. Kæmpegaard (Denmark) H Kæmpegaard | 26 | 21

Quarter-finals
5/8 | (England) M Constable (England) L Swan | 21 | 21
3/4 | (Denmark) E B. Kæmpegaard (Denmark) H Kæmpegaard | 19 | 19

==== Section 4 ====
First round
(Finland) J Atrila (Finland) E Heikkinen | 15 | 17
(India) J. B. S. Vidyadhar (India) N Gadgil | 21 | 21
(Ukraine) Y Repiakh (Ukraine) Y Nogina | 21 | 21
SUB | (Switzerland) J Scheffeler (Switzerland) N Siegenthaler | 17 | 11
(Germany) F Dietrich (Germany) S Schmiodt | 13 | 9
(Denmark) J Thomsen (Iceland) D Harðardottír | 21 | 21
(Spain) F López (Spain) M J Martínez | 11 | 13
(India) A Sharma (India) B Sharma | 21 | 21

Second round
(India) J. B. S. Vidyadhar (India) N Gadgil | 21 | 21
(Spain) M Berrocal (Spain) C M Martínez | 4 | 9
(Ukraine) Y Repiakh (Ukraine) Y Nogina | 21 | 23 | 15
5/8 | (Sweden) S Edvardsson (Sweden) K Wengberg | 23 | 21 | 21
(Denmark) J Thomsen (Iceland) D Harðardottír | 21 | 21
(Norway) V Næss (Norway) C Aase | 5 | 7
(India) A Sharma (India) B Sharma | 15 | 10
2 | (England) M King (England) M Armstrong | 21 | 21

Third round
(India) J. B. S. Vidyadhar (India) N Gadgil | 15 | 21 | 21
5/8 | (Sweden) S Edvardsson (Sweden) K Wengberg | 21 | 13 | 16
(Denmark) J Thomsen (Iceland) D Harðardottír | 21 | 21
2 | (England) M King (England) M Armstrong | 12 | 5

Quarter-finals
(India) J. B. S. Vidyadhar (India) N Gadgil | 9 | 13
(Denmark) J Thomsen (Iceland) D Harðardottír | 21 | 21
