= 2019 BWF World Senior Championships – 35+ =

Tournament details
- Dates: 4 August 2019 – 11 August 2019
- Edition: 9
- Level: International
- Competitors: 207 from 30 nations
- Venue: Spodek
- Location: Katowice, Poland

Champions
- Men's singles: (Japan) Hirofumi Fujino
- Women's singles: (Thailand) Molthila Kitjanon
- Men's doubles: (Denmark) Tommy Sørensen (Denmark) Jesper Thomsen
- Women's doubles: (France) Hélène Dijoux (France) Audrey Petit
- Mixed doubles: (Denmark) Tommy Sørensen (Denmark) Lisbeth T. Haagensen

These are the results of 2019 BWF World Senior Championships' 35+ events.

== Men's singles ==
=== Seeds ===
1. (Chinese Taipei) Liu Lung-hsiang (second round)
2. (Japan) Yoshitaka Yone (second round)
3. (Denmark) Niels Christian Blittrup (second round)
4. (Germany) Hendrik Westermeyer (second round)
5. (England) Andrew Aspinal (second round)
6. (Russia) Maxim Muzhevlev (second round)
7. (England) Arak Bhokanandh (first round)
8. (Chinese Taipei) Wu Te-wei (first round)

=== Finals ===
Semifinals
(Germany) Philip Droste | 19 | 16
(Chinese Taipei) Chao Chun-ken | 21 | 21
(Japan) Hirofumi Fujino | 21 | 21
(Russia) Anatoly Petelin | 10 | 15

Final
(Chinese Taipei) Chao Chun-ken | 19 | 21 | 15
(Japan) Hirofumi Fujino | 21 | 16 | 21

=== Top half ===
==== Section 1 ====
First round
(Germany) P Droste | 21 | 21
(Austria) R Höller | 7 | 14
(England) M Burgeman | 15 | 12
(Norway) V Ramaswamy | 21 | 21
(Uganda) R Kasserenge | 11 | 11
(Finland) J Atrila | 21 | 21
(Denmark) B Banhsen | 22 | 14
(Switzerland) T Bless | 24 | 21
(Sweden) O Lundqvist | 21 | 17 | 13
(Poland) J Janaszek | 13 | 21 | 21
(Japan) M Yamasaki | 21 | 12
(France) Q Gallet | 23 | 21

Second round
1 | (Chinese Taipei) Liu L-h | 14 | 7
(Germany) P Droste | 21 | 21
(Norway) V Ramaswamy | 11 | 12
(Finland) J Atrila | 21 | 21
6 | (Russia) M Muzhevlev | 11 | 19
(Switzerland) T Bless | 21 | 21
(Poland) J Janaszek | 12 | 21 | 13
(France) Q Gallet | 21 | 15 | 21

Third round
(Germany) P Droste | 21 | 21
(Finland) J Atrila | 11 | 13
(Switzerland) T Bless | 12 | 18
(France) Q Gallet | 21 | 21

Quarterfinals
(Germany) P Droste | 15 | 21 | 21
(France) Q Gallet | 21 | 17 | 12

==== Section 2 ====
First round
(Israel) O Khutoraner | 9 | 9
(France) B Delaval | 21 | 21
(Slovakia) M Gomola | 16 | 13
(Latvia) O Koziņecs | 21 | 21
(Spain) J M Sánchez | 7 | 6
(Japan) M Higashi | 21 | 21
5 | (England) A Aspinal | 21 | 21
(Finland) S Parikka | 19 | 18
(Poland) R Kasprów | 21 | 21
(Sweden) T Bäckström | 19 | 11
(India) Y Chauhan | 21 | 21
(Germany) M Prinz | 18 | 16
(Chinese Taipei) Chao C-k | 21 | 21
(Austria) M Hofmann | 6 | 8

Second round
3 | (Denmark) N C Blittrup | 21 | 15 | 17
(France) B Delaval | 18 | 21 | 21
(Latvia) O Koziņecs | 12 | 15
(Japan) M Higashi | 21 | 21
5 | (England) A Aspinal | 21 | 17 | 9
(Poland) R Kasprów | 11 | 21 | 21
(India) Y Chauhan | 9 | 12
(Chinese Taipei) Chao C-k | 21 | 21

Third round
(France) B Delaval | 20 | 21 | 18
(Japan) M Higashi | 22 | 14 | 21
(Poland) R Kasprów | 8 | 17
(Chinese Taipei) Chao C-k | 21 | 21

Quarterfinals
(Japan) M Higashi | 14 | 15
(Chinese Taipei) Chao C-k | 21 | 21

=== Bottom half ===
==== Section 3 ====
First round
(Austria) M Ratzenböck | 17 | 13
(India) V Sharma | 21 | 21
(Japan) H Fujino | 21 | 21
(Russia) M Misura | 12 | 6
(Poland) T Lipski | 14 | 19
(Switzerland) A Neuweiler | 21 | 21
(Finland) M Väisänen | 21 | 21
8 | (Chinese Taipei) Wu T-w | 12 | 18
(Nepal) I Mehata
(England) P Freeman | w | / | o
(Estonia) M Soo | 21 | 21
(Denmark) K Herløv | 16 | 17
(Ukraine) M Shkliaiev | 20 | 12
(Sweden) D von Dahn | 22 | 21

Second round
(India) V Sharma | 15 | 9
(Japan) H Fujino | 21 | 21
(Switzerland) A Neuweiler | 18 | 22
(Finland) M Väisänen | 21 | 24
(England) P Freeman | 17 | 11
(Estonia) M Soo | 21 | 21
(Sweden) D von Dahn | 21 | 21
4 | (Germany) H Westermeyer | 9 | 19

Third round
(Japan) H Fujino | 21 | 21
(Finland) M Väisänen | 15 | 15
(Estonia) M Soo | 8 | 6
(Sweden) D von Dahn | 21 | 21

Quarterfinals
(Japan) H Fujino | 21 | 21
(Sweden) D von Dahn | 10 | 17

==== Section 4 ====
First round
(France) R Flepp | 21 | 21
(Poland) R Rykowski | 11 | 13
(India) M Rawat | 21 | 21
(Latvia) V Bajars | 13 | 9
(Slovakia) M Křenek | 18 | 22 | 21
(Denmark) C Jørgensen | 21 | 20 | 23
(Germany) P Histel | 13 | 21 | 21
7 | (England) A Bhokanandh | 21 | 16 | 12
(Finland) O Rusama | 7 | 9
(Chinese Taipei) Lin Y-c | 21 | 21
(Switzerland) D Ciardo | 21 | 21
(Austria) W Zeiml | 19 | 8
(Russia) A Petelin | 21 | 21
(Sweden) J Björkå | 14 | 13

Second round
(France) R Flepp | 14 | 10
(India) M Rawat | 21 | 21
(Denmark) C Jørgensen | 18 | 8
(Germany) P Histel | 21 | 21
(Chinese Taipei) Lin Y-c | 21 | 21
(Switzerland) D Ciardo | 14 | 19
(Russia) A Petelin | 21 | 21
2 | (Japan) Y Yone | 12 | 10

Third round
(India) M Rawat | 21 | 21
(Germany) P Histel | 19 | 19
(Chinese Taipei) Lin Y-c | 13 | 10
(Russia) A Petelin | 21 | 21

Quarterfinals
(India) M Rawat | 18 | 21 | 19
(Russia) A Petelin | 21 | 12 | 21

== Women's singles ==
=== Seeds ===
1. (France) Perrine Le Buhanic (silver medalist)
2. (Denmark) Mette K. Pedersen (third round)
3. (England) Joanna Dix (bronze medalist)
4. (Japan) Noriko Sanada (quarterfinals)
5. (India) Parul Rawat (second round)
6. (Sweden) Cecilia Närfors (third round)
7. (France) Audrey Petit (second round)
8. (Sweden) Wendy Fredriksson (third round)

=== Finals ===
Semifinals
1 | (France) Perrine Le Buhanic | 21 | 21
(Switzerland) Ava Monney | 10 | 15
3 | (England) Joanna Dix | 12 | 10
(Thailand) Molthila Kitjanon | 21 | 21

Final
1 | (France) Perrine Le Buhanic | 12 | 21 | 9
(Thailand) Molthila Kitjanon | 21 | 15 | 21

=== Top half ===
==== Section 1 ====
First round
(Poland) D Cygan | 21 | 21
(United Arab Emirates) A Kuttikrishnan | 13 | 14

Second round
1 | (France) P Le Buhanic | 21 | 21
(Germany) A Seifert | 7 | 13
(Norway) M Formo | 21 | 23 | 17
(Latvia) A Svalbe | 16 | 25 | 21
8 | (Sweden) W Fredriksson | 21 | 21
(Ukraine) Y Mahai | 14 | 15
(England) S Brewer | 16 | 12
(Poland) D Cygan | 21 | 21

Third round
1 | (France) P Le Buhanic | 21 | 21
(Latvia) A Svalbe | 10 | 15
8 | (Sweden) W Fredriksson | 13 | 17
(Poland) D Cygan | 21 | 21

Quarterfinals
1 | (France) P Le Buhanic | 21 | 21
(Poland) D Cygan | 15 | 16

==== Section 2 ====
First round
(Slovakia) S Andrejková | 8 | 9
(Germany) M Exl | 21 | 21

Second round
4 | (Japan) N Sanada | 21 | 21
(Denmark) I V Jakobsen | 11 | 14
(Sweden) J Kruseborn | 21 | 19 | 21
(France) S Férec | 15 | 21 | 18
5 | (India) P Rawat | 14 | 19
(Switzerland) A Monney | 21 | 21
(Poland) A Trzcińska | 18 | 21 | 21
(Germany) M Exl | 21 | 19 | 19

Third round
4 | (Japan) N Sanada | 22 | 21
(Sweden) J Kruseborn | 20 | 13
(Switzerland) A Monney | 21 | 21
(Poland) A Trzcińska | 8 | 10

Quarterfinals
4 | (Japan) N Sanada | 17 | 17
(Switzerland) A Monney | 21 | 21

=== Bottom half ===
==== Section 3 ====
First round
(Scotland) L Muir | 7 | 21 | 16
(Sweden) L Häggman | 21 | 16 | 21
(Finland) L Ahonen | 8 | 11
(Germany) H Vogt | 21 | 21

Second round
(Sweden) L Häggman | 11 | 9
(Japan) S Ueyama | 21 | 21
(Poland) D Guzik-Płuchowska | 21 | 21
7 | (France) A Petit | 12 | 17
(Germany) H Vogt | 21 | 14 | 21
(Italy) M T T Nguyen | 17 | 21 | 10
(India) K. I Jamir | 11 | 6
3 | (England) J Dix | 21 | 21

Third round
(Japan) S Ueyama | 21 | 14 | 15
(Poland) D Guzik-Płuchowska | 14 | 21 | 21
(Germany) H Vogt | 9 | 14
3 | (England) J Dix | 21 | 21

Quarterfinals
(Poland) D Guzik-Płuchowska | 21 | 14 | 20
3 | (England) J Dix | 14 | 21 | 22

==== Section 4 ====
First round
(Slovakia) D Egriová | 21 | 21
(Poland) A Puzio | 13 | 13

Second round
(Slovakia) D Egriová | 9 | 6
(Bulgaria) M Dobreva | 21 | 21
(India) S Melasheemi | 20 | 15
6 | (Sweden) C Närfors | 21 | 21
(Thailand) M Kitjanon | 21 | 21
(Czech Republic) S Škodová | 2 | 3
(France) Y Le Lan | 4 | 14
2 | (Denmark) M K. Pedersen | 21 | 21

Third round
(Bulgaria) M Dobreva | 21 | 21
6 | (Sweden) C Närfors | 15 | 14
(Thailand) M Kitjanon | 21 | 21
2 | (Denmark) M K. Pedersen | 9 | 12

Quarterfinals
(Bulgaria) M Dobreva | 8 | 7
(Thailand) M Kitjanon | 21 | 21

== Men's doubles ==
=== Seeds ===
1. (Germany) Thorsten Hukriede / Hendrik Westermeyer (quarterfinals)
2. (India) Joy T. Antony / Sanave Thomas (quarterfinals)
3. (Thailand) Naruenart Chuaymak / Atipong Kitjanon (quarterfinals)
4. (Chinese Taipei) Chen Chien-kuang / Tsai Ming-wei (bronze medalists)
5. (England) Paul Freeman / Philip Troke (third round)
6. (Denmark) Tommy Sørensen / Jesper Thomsen (gold medalists)
7. (France) Sébastien Coto / Marc de la Giroday (third round)
8. (Sweden) Jens Marmsten / Dennis von Dahn (bronze medalists)

=== Finals ===
Semifinals
6 | (Denmark) Tommy Sørensen (Denmark) Jesper Thomsen | 21 | 21 | 21
4 | (Chinese Taipei) Chen Chien-kuang (Chinese Taipei) Tsai Ming-wei | 15 | 23 | 7
8 | (Sweden) Jan Marmsten (Sweden) Dennis von Dahn | 10 | 23 | 16
(Denmark) Niels Christian Blittrup (Denmark) Casper Lund | 21 | 21 | 21

Final
6 | (Denmark) Tommy Sørensen (Denmark) Jesper Thomsen | 21 | 21
(Denmark) Niels Christian Blittrup (Denmark) Casper Lund | 18 | 19

=== Top half ===
==== Section 1 ====
First round
(Switzerland) D Ciardo (Switzerland) A Neuweiler | 17 | 21 | 21
(Poland) P Ogrodziński (Poland) Ł Szmel | 21 | 19 | 19
(Finland) A Koljonen (Finland) J von Hertzen | 21 | 21
(Sweden) T Bäckström (Sweden) J Björkå | 15 | 8

Second round
1 | (Germany) T Hukriede (Germany) H Westermeyer | 21 | 21
(France) T Blondeau (France) R Flepp | 10 | 12
(Austria) M Hofmann (Israel) O Khutoraner | 18 | 21 | 15
(Switzerland) D Ciardo (Switzerland) A Neuweiler | 21 | 18 | 21
6 | (Denmark) T Sørensen (Denmark) J Thomsen | 21 | 21
SUB | (Nepal) R Bastola (Nepal) S Singha | 6 | 6
(India) R Singh (India) D B Thapa | 14 | 21 | 20
(Finland) A Koljonen (Finland) J von Hertzen | 21 | 17 | 22

Third round
1 | (Germany) T Hukriede (Germany) H Westermeyer | 21 | 21
(Switzerland) D Ciardo (Switzerland) A Neuweiler | 13 | 7
6 | (Denmark) T Sørensen (Denmark) J Thomsen | 21 | 21
(Finland) A Koljonen (Finland) J von Hertzen | 16 | 7

Quarterfinals
1 | (Germany) T Hukriede (Germany) H Westermeyer | 17 | 21 | 9
6 | (Denmark) T Sørensen (Denmark) J Thomsen | 21 | 19 | 21

==== Section 2 ====
First round
(Russia) A Degtyarev (Russia) S Igoshin | 14 | 14
(India) P Bahatre (India) M Rawat | 21 | 21
(Latvia) V Bajars (Latvia) I Keiss | 21 | 21
(Slovakia) M Gomola (Slovakia) M Křenek | 13 | 19
(France) J Marache (France) K Prioul | 21 | 21
(Norway) J E Gulli (Sweden) A Persson | 8 | 8

Second round
4 | (Chinese Taipei) Chen C-k (Chinese Taipei) Tsai M-w | 21 | 21
(Austria) C Putz (Austria) M Ratzenböck | 9 | 9
(Poland) R Aleksandrowicz (Poland) T Lipski | 11 | 18
(India) P Bahatre (India) M Rawat | 21 | 21
5 | (England) P Freeman (England) P Troke | 21 | 21
(Latvia) V Bajars (Latvia) I Keiss | 14 | 18
(Sweden) T Ahlgren (Sweden) O Lundqvist | 14 | 19
(France) J Marache (France) K Prioul | 21 | 21

Third round
4 | (Chinese Taipei) Chen C-k (Chinese Taipei) Tsai M-w | 21 | 21
(India) P Bahatre (India) M Rawat | 6 | 15
5 | (England) P Freeman (England) P Troke | 11 | 17
(France) J Marache (France) K Prioul | 21 | 21

Quarterfinals
4 | (Chinese Taipei) Chen C-k (Chinese Taipei) Tsai M-w | w | / | o
(France) J Marache (France) K Prioul

=== Bottom half ===
==== Section 3 ====
First round
(India) A Agarwal (India) A Sharma | 23 | 21 | 23
(Switzerland) T Bless (Switzerland) J Scheffler | 25 | 18 | 21
(Germany) F Dietrich (Germany) B Six | 21 | 21
(Denmark) S Hansen (Denmark) C Jørgensen | 9 | 8
(England) A Aspinal (England) A Bhokanandh | 21 | 26
(Russia) M Misura (Russia) A Petelin | 12 | 24

Second round
(India) A Agarwal (India) A Sharma | 21 | 21
(Russia) M Muzhevlev (Norway) V Ramaswamy | 11 | 10
(Germany) F Dietrich (Germany) B Six | 5 | 11
8 | (Sweden) J Marmsten (Sweden) D von Dahn | 21 | 21
(England) A Aspinal (England) A Bhokanandh | 18 | 16
(Germany) F Hoffmann (England) S Tendayhabany | 21 | 21
(Poland) Z Jasiulewicz (Poland) K Turonek | 15 | 10
3 | (Thailand) N Chuaymak (Thailand) A Kitjanon | 21 | 21

Third round
(India) A Agarwal (India) A Sharma | 15 | 16
8 | (Sweden) J Marmsten (Sweden) D von Dahn | 21 | 21
(Germany) F Hoffmann (England) S Tendayhabany | 15 | 9
3 | (Thailand) N Chuaymak (Thailand) A Kitjanon | 21 | 21

Quarterfinals
8 | (Sweden) J Marmsten (Sweden) D von Dahn | 21 | 21
3 | (Thailand) N Chuaymak (Thailand) A Kitjanon | 17 | 17

==== Section 4 ====
First round
(Germany) P Droste (Germany) J Ehlert | 17 | 14
(Denmark) N C Blittrup (Denmark) C Lund | 21 | 21
(Austria) R Höller (Austria) W Zeiml | 21 | 22 | 18
(Spain) D Gomez (Spain) J M Sánchez | 18 | 24 | 21

Second round
(Denmark) N C Blittrup (Denmark) C Lund | 21 | 21
(Finland) T Kemppinen (Finland) M Väisänen | 10 | 10
(England) M Burgeman (England) H Fisher | 7 | 13
7 | (France) S Coto (France) M de la Giroday | 21 | 21
(Spain) D Gomez (Spain) J M Sánchez | 21 | 8 | 15
(Poland) M Grzywacz (Poland) M Puciato | 17 | 21 | 21
(Japan) E Betsumori (Japan) M Higashi | 15 | 21 | 12
2 | (India) J T. Antony (India) S Thoams | 21 | 17 | 21

Third round
(Denmark) N C Blittrup (Denmark) C Lund | 22 | 21
7 | (France) S Coto (France) M de la Giroday | 20 | 15
(Poland) M Grzywacz (Poland) M Puciato | 12 | 9
2 | (India) J T. Antony (India) S Thoams | 21 | 21

Quarterfinals
(Denmark) N C Blittrup (Denmark) C Lund | 21 | 25 | 21
2 | (India) J T. Antony (India) S Thoams | 17 | 27 | 15

== Women's doubles ==
=== Seeds ===
1. (Sweden) Jenny Kruseborn / Cecilia Närfors (second round)
2. (Japan) Noriko Sanada / Sayaka Ueyama (quarterfinals)
3. (France) Hélène Dijoux / Audrey Petit (gold medalists)
4. (England) Sarah Burgess / Joanna Dix (silver medalists)

=== Finals ===
Semifinals
(Denmark) Lisbeth T. Haagensen (Denmark) Helle Kæmpegaard | 21 | 17 | 18
3 | (France) Hélène Dijoux (France) Audrey Petit | 12 | 21 | 21
4 | (England) Sarah Burgess (England) Joanna Dix | 21 | 21
(Germany) Monja Ehlert (Germany) Gesa Weise | 13 | 13

Final
3 | (France) Hélène Dijoux (France) Audrey Petit | 21 | 21
4 | (England) Sarah Burgess (England) Joanna Dix | 14 | 16

=== Top half ===
==== Section 1 ====
First round
(Denmark) L T. Haagensen (Denmark) H Kæmpegaard | 21 | 18 | 21
(Switzerland) A Monney (Scotland) L Muir | 18 | 21 | 8
(India) N G Santhanam (India) D Sardesai | 21 | 25
(Poland) A Kornacka (Poland) K Olejarz | 18 | 23
(Czech Republic) S Škodová (Slovakia) K Tekeľová | 21 | 2 | 12
(France) M Le Pape (France) A Peregrina | 15 | 21 | 21

Second round
1 | (Sweden) J Kruseborn (Sweden) C Närfors | 17 | 18
(Denmark) L T. Haagensen (Denmark) H Kæmpegaard | 21 | 21
(India) N G Santhanam (India) D Sardesai | 21 | 21
(France) M Le Pape (France) A Peregrina | 18 | 17

Quarterfinals
(Denmark) L T. Haagensen (Denmark) H Kæmpegaard | 21 | 21
(India) N G Santhanam (India) D Sardesai | 16 | 16

==== Section 2 ====
First round
3 | (France) H Dijoux (France) A Petit | 21 | 21
(India) N Gadgil (India) P Patil | 11 | 13
(Germany) T Kähler (Germany) K Meyer | 21 | 21
(Denmark) T Blittrup (Norway) M Formo | 12 | 17
(Poland) D Cygan (Poland) K Polakowska | 19 | 21 | 13
(England) M Armstrong (England) S Brewer | 21 | 17 | 21
(Denmark) I V Jakobsen (Switzerland) R Spörri | 21 | 21
(Slovakia) D Egriová (Slovakia) M Fekečová | 8 | 13

Second round
3 | (France) H Dijoux (France) A Petit | 21 | 21
(Germany) T Kähler (Germany) K Meyer | 14 | 16
(England) M Armstrong (England) S Brewer | 21 | 21
(Denmark) I V Jakobsen (Switzerland) R Spörri | 10 | 12

Quarterfinals
3 | (France) H Dijoux (France) A Petit | 21 | 21
(England) M Armstrong (England) S Brewer | 7 | 12

=== Bottom half ===
==== Section 3 ====
First round
(France) M Ledoux (France) E Rairoux | 21 | 21
(Poland) O Koniuch (Poland) U Zielińska | 16 | 17
(Sweden) N Azadi (Sweden) L Häggman | 8 | 9
(India) S Melasheemi (India) A Rode | 21 | 21
(Germany) S Grätz (Germany) M Hirsch | 21 | 21
(Finland) A Hintsala (Finland) U Syrjävaara | 11 | 15
(Slovakia) S Andrejková (Slovakia) B Vincurská | 4 | 7
4 | (England) S Burgess (England) J Dix | 21 | 21

Second round
(France) M Ledoux (France) E Rairoux | 20 | 10
(India) S Melasheemi (India) A Rode | 22 | 21
(Germany) S Grätz (Germany) M Hirsch | 21 | 14 | 12
4 | (England) S Burgess (England) J Dix | 19 | 21 | 21

Quarterfinals
(India) S Melasheemi (India) A Rode | 25 | 15
4 | (England) S Burgess (England) J Dix | 27 | 21

==== Section 4 ====
First round
(Germany) M Ehlert (Germany) G Weise | 21 | 21
(France) S Férec (France) Y Le Lan | 7 | 15
(Sweden) W Fredriksson (Sweden) D Harfman Bromée | 21 | 21
(India) M Deka (India) S Pujari | 19 | 13
(Poland) M Kojder (Poland) A Trzcińska | 5 | 9
(Denmark) M K. Pedersen (Denmark) P Strøm | 21 | 21
(United Arab Emirates) A Kuttikrishnan (United Arab Emirates) D M Mathew | 8 | 8
2 | (Japan) N Sanada (Japan) S Ueyama | 21 | 21

Second round
(Germany) M Ehlert (Germany) G Weise | 21 | 21
(Sweden) W Fredriksson (Sweden) D Harfman Bromée | 10 | 16
(Denmark) M K. Pedersen (Denmark) P Strøm | 9 | 18
2 | (Japan) N Sanada (Japan) S Ueyama | 21 | 21

Quarterfinals
(Germany) M Ehlert (Germany) G Weise | 21 | 21
2 | (Japan) N Sanada (Japan) S Ueyama | 16 | 12

== Mixed doubles ==
=== Seeds ===
1. (Germany) Felix Hoffmann / Claudia Vogelgsang (third round)
2. (Denmark) Tommy Sørensen / Lisbeth T. Haagensen (gold medalists)
3. (England) Mark King / Mhairi Armstrong (bronze medalists)
4. (France) Thomas Blondeau / Hélène Dijoux (third round)
5. (Sweden) Fredrik du Hane / (England) Lynne Swan (quarterfinals)
6. (Japan) Eiji Betsumori / Noriko Sanada (second round)
7. (Denmark) Niels Christian Blittrup / Tanja Blittrup (quarterfinals)
8. (Sweden) Tomas Ahlgren / Cecilia Närfors (second round)

=== Finals ===
Semifinals
(Thailand) Atipong Kitjanon (Thailand) Molthila Kitjanon | 21 | 21
3 | (England) Mark King (England) Mhairi Armstrong | 15 | 9
(Germany) Jens Ehlert (Germany) Monja Ehlert | 13 | 11
2 | (Denmark) Tommy Sørensen (Denmark) Lisbeth T. Haagensen | 21 | 21

Final
(Thailand) Atipong Kitjanon (Thailand) Molthila Kitjanon | 11 | 21 | 15
2 | (Denmark) Tommy Sørensen (Denmark) Lisbeth T. Haagensen | 21 | 15 | 21

=== Top half ===
==== Section 1 ====
First round
(India) S G Varadaraj (India) A Rode | 21 | 21
(Denmark) S Hansen (Denmark) I V Jakobsen | 9 | 3
(Czech Republic) M Šimo (Czech Republic) S Škodová | 14 | 15
(Ukraine) M Shkliaiev (Ukraine) Y Mahai | 21 | 21
(Japan) H Fujino (Japan) S Ueyama | 21 | 21
(Poland) R Kasprów (Poland) K Polakowska | 13 | 6

Second round
1 | (Germany) F Hoffmann (Germany) C Vogelgsang | 24 | 17 | 21
(France) J Marache (France) Y Le Lan | 22 | 21 | 9
(Thailand) A Kitjanon (Thailand) M Kitjanon | 21 | 21
(India) S G Varadaraj (India) A Rode | 10 | 6
5 | (Sweden) F du Hane (England) L Swan | 21 | 21
(Ukraine) M Shkliaiev (Ukraine) Y Mahai | 15 | 11
(Switzerland) S Knöpfli (Switzerland) R Spörri | 7 | 12
(Japan) H Fujino (Japan) S Ueyama | 21 | 21

Third round
1 | (Germany) F Hoffmann (Germany) C Vogelgsang | 17 | 10
(Thailand) A Kitjanon (Thailand) M Kitjanon | 21 | 21
5 | (Sweden) F du Hane (England) L Swan | 21 | 23
(Japan) H Fujino (Japan) S Ueyama | 17 | 21

Quarterfinals
(Thailand) A Kitjanon (Thailand) M Kitjanon | 21 | 21
5 | (Sweden) F du Hane (England) L Swan | 14 | 14

==== Section 2 ====
First round
(France) M de la Giroday (France) M Le Pape | 23 | 19 | 21
(Finland) M Väisänen (Finland) A Hintsala | 21 | 21 | 19
(Slovakia) M Křenek (Slovakia) B Vincurská | 21 | 17 | 17
(Switzerland) D Ciardo (Switzerland) M-C Beaudoin Ekstrand | 18 | 21 | 21
(India) V Sharma (India) K. I Jamir | 21 | 21
(Sweden) O Henningsson (Sweden) J Kruseborn | 9 | 18

Second round
3 | (England) M King (England) M Armstrong | 21 | 21
(Germany) P Pinzer (Germany) M Exl | 9 | 17
(Russia) A Degtyarev (Sweden) L Häggman | 11 | 15
(France) M de la Giroday (France) M Le Pape | 21 | 21
7 | (Denmark) N C Blittrup (Denmark) T Blittrup | 21 | 21
(Switzerland) D Ciardo (Switzerland) M-C Beaudoin Ekstrand | 12 | 10
(Poland) R Aleksandrowicz (Poland) O Koniuch | 10 | 13
(India) V Sharma (India) K. I Jamir | 21 | 21

Third round
3 | (England) M King (England) M Armstrong | 22 | 21
(France) M de la Giroday (France) M Le Pape | 20 | 13
7 | (Denmark) N C Blittrup (Denmark) T Blittrup | 17 | 21 | 21
(India) V Sharma (India) K. I Jamir | 21 | 17 | 7

Quarterfinals
3 | (England) M King (England) M Armstrong | 21 | 21
7 | (Denmark) N C Blittrup (Denmark) T Blittrup | 18 | 16

=== Bottom half ===
==== Section 3 ====
First round
(Hong Kong) K Fung S K (Hong Kong) Choy V | 21 | 21
(Finland) O Rusama (Finland) L Ahonen | 9 | 8
(Poland) M Suski (Poland) D Cygan | 19 | 21 | 14
(Latvia) M Kažemaks (Latvia) A Svalbe | 21 | 15 | 21
(England) P Troke (England) S Burgess | 18 | 21 | 16
(Switzerland) T Bless (Switzerland) A Monney | 21 | 18 | 21
(India) A K. Shetty (India) A Lele | 21 | 21
(Italy) M Fuda (Italy) M T T Nguyen | 5 | 6

Second round
(Hong Kong) K Fung S K (Hong Kong) Choy V | 21 | 21
(Slovakia) M Gomola (Slovakia) D Egriová | 4 | 6
(Latvia) M Kažemaks (Latvia) A Svalbe | 21 | 21
8 | (Sweden) T Ahlgren (Sweden) C Närfors | 13 | 18
(Switzerland) T Bless (Switzerland) A Monney | 14 | 10
(Germany) J Ehlert (Germany) M Ehlert | 21 | 21
(India) A K. Shetty (India) A Lele | 15 | 13
4 | (France) T Blondeau (France) H Dijoux | 21 | 21

Third round
(Hong Kong) K Fung S K (Hong Kong) Choy V | 21 | 21
(Latvia) M Kažemaks (Latvia) A Svalbe | 18 | 15
(Germany) J Ehlert (Germany) M Ehlert | 18 | 21 | 21
4 | (France) T Blondeau (France) H Dijoux | 21 | 10 | 19

Quarterfinals
(Hong Kong) K Fung S K (Hong Kong) Choy V | 19 | 8^{r}
(Germany) J Ehlert (Germany) M Ehlert | 21 | 16

==== Section 4 ====
First round
(Sweden) J Björkå (Sweden) W Fredriksson | 21 | 21
(England) P J. Sunderland (England) S Brewer | 13 | 17
(France) Q Gallet (France) A Peregrina | 21 | 21
(Poland) R Walas (Poland) U Zielińska | 13 | 14
(United Arab Emirates) R B Bhat (United Arab Emirates) A Kuttikrishnan | 21 | 21
(Switzerland) A Neuweiler (Scotland) L Muir | 17 | 13

Second round
(Sweden) J Björkå (Sweden) W Fredriksson | 18 | 21 | 25
(Germany) M Prinz (Germany) G Weise | 21 | 19 | 27
(France) Q Gallet (France) A Peregrina | 21 | 15 | 21
6 | (Japan) E Betsumori (Japan) N Sanada | 19 | 21 | 18
(United Arab Emirates) R B Bhat (United Arab Emirates) A Kuttikrishnan | 12 | 10
(India) S Niddodi (India) N Gadgi | 21 | 21
(Denmark) Jespar Thomsen (Iceland) D Harðardóttir | 23 | 12
2 | (Denmark) T Sørensen (Denmark) L T. Haagensen | 25 | 21

Third round
(Germany) M Prinz (Germany) G Weise | 11 | 21 | 23
(France) Q Gallet (France) A Peregrina | 21 | 18 | 21
(India) S Niddodi (India) N Gadgi | 9 | 24 | 10
2 | (Denmark) T Sørensen (Denmark) L T. Haagensen | 21 | 22 | 21

Quarterfinals
(Germany) M Prinz (Germany) G Weise | 12 | 10
2 | (Denmark) T Sørensen (Denmark) L T. Haagensen | 21 | 21
