= Ole Sørensen =

Ole Sørensen is the name of:

- Ole Sørensen (actor), Danish actor, in upcoming film Somewhere Out There directed by Alexander Payne
- Ole Sørensen (footballer) (1937–2015), Danish footballer
- Ole Sørensen (sailor) (1883–1958), Norwegian Olympic gold medalist in 1920
- Ole Sorensen (wrestler) (born 1948), Canadian Olympic wrestler
- Ole Nørskov Sørensen (born 1952), Danish Olympic handball player

== See also ==
- Sørensen
