= 2019 BWF World Senior Championships – 75+ =

2019 BWF World Senior Championships – 75
Tournament details
- Dates: 4 August 2019 – 11 August 2019
- Edition: 9
- Level: International
- Competitors: 50 from 17 nations
- Venue: Spodek
- Location: Katowice, Poland

Champions
- Men's singles: (Thailand) Seri Chintanaseri
- Women's singles: (Germany) Renate Gabriel
- Men's doubles: (Germany) Gerd Pflug (Germany) Dietmar Unser
- Women's doubles: (England) Beryl Goodall (England) Mary Jenner
- Mixed doubles: (Germany) Hans Schumacher (Germany) Renate Gabriel

These are the results of 2019 BWF World Senior Championships' 75+ events.

== Men's singles ==
=== Seeds ===
1. (Poland) Paweł Gasz (silver medalist)
2. (Japan) Akira Hirota (bronze medalist)
3. (England) Roger Baldwin (quarterfinals)
4. (Thailand) Seri Chintanaseri (gold medalist)

=== Finals ===
Semifinals
1	(Poland) Paweł Gasz	21	21
(Germany) Matthias Kiefer	9	11
4	(Thailand) Seri Chintanaseri	22	21
2	(Japan) Akira Hirota	20	18

Final
1	(Poland) Paweł Gasz	16	21	18
4	(Thailand) Seri Chintanaseri	21	19	21

=== Top half ===
==== Section 1 ====
First Round
(India) P. C. S. Rao	7	13
(Japan) Y Sugitani	21	21
(Sweden) K-O Åkesson	9	14
(Thailand) T Kornchankul	21	21
(Germany) R Pfennig	21	21
(Finland) K Lohman	19	17

Second Round
1	(Poland) P Gasz	21	21
(Japan) Y Sugitani	14	15
(Thailand) T Kornchankul	21	21
(Germany) R Pfennig	14	11

Quarterfinals
1	(Poland) P Gasz	21	21
(Thailand) T Kornchankul	8	3

==== Section 2 ====
First Round
3	(England) R Baldwin	21	21
(France) J Devesa	5	8
(Finland) O Peitsala	15	21	21
(Poland) C Gwiazda	21	9	18
(Canada) M P A Foubister	21	21
(Scotland) L Frame	10	10
(Belarus) M Sasimovich	6	8
(Germany) M Kiefer	21	21

Second Round
3	(England) R Baldwin	21	21
(Finland) O Peitsala	10	17
(Canada) M P A Foubister	13	12
(Germany) M Kiefer	21	21

Quarterfinals
3	(England) R Baldwin	21	18	9^{r}
(Germany) M Kiefer	17	21	8

=== Bottom half ===
==== Section 3 ====
First Round
(France) F Thomas	11	18
(Finland) O Perkinen	21	21
(Slovakia) J Kozák	17	11
(Norway) K S Liland	21	21
(Germany) H Hanrath	20	21	21
(Poland) L Tukendorf	22	14	16
(India) A Christian Motilal	7	16
4	(Thailand) S Chintanaseri	21	21

Second Round
(Finland) O Perkinen	11	12
(Norway) K S Liland	21	21
(Germany) H Hanrath	18	21	9
4	(Thailand) S Chintanaseri	21	18	21

Quarterfinals
(Norway) K S Liland	21	11
4	(Thailand) S Chintanaseri	23	21

==== Section 4 ====
First Round
(Poland) J Stachowski	22	18	18
(Canada) J Lauw	20	21	21
(Sweden) D Bengtsson	21	22	16
(Germany) D Unser	16	24	21
(Denmark) H Johannesen	11	6
(Malaysia) V Menon	21	21
(Finland) J Wiberg	7	7
2	(Japan) A Hirota	21	21

Second Round
(Canada) J Lauw	12	15
(Germany) D Unser	21	21
(Malaysia) V Menon	10	21
2	(Japan) A Hirota	21	23

Quarterfinals
(Germany) D Unser	12	17
2	(Japan) A Hirota	21	21

== Women's singles ==
=== Seeds ===
1. (Germany) Renate Gabriel (gold medalist)
2. (England) Beryl Goodall (group stage)

=== Group A ===
Pos	Team	Pld	W	L	GF	GA	GD	PF	PA	PD	Qualification
1	(Germany) Renate Gabriel	2	2	0	4	0	+4	84	41	+43	Qualified to Semifinals
2	(England) Mary Jenner	2	1	1	2	2	0	69	63	+6	Qualified to Semifinals
3	(Peru) Maria Caridad Romero	2	0	2	0	4	−4	35	84	−49	

Source: TS

Date		Score		Set 1	Set 2	Set 3
Aug 5; 14:30	Renate Gabriel (Germany)	2–0	(Peru) Maria Caridad Romero	21–7	21–7	
Aug 6; 13:50	Mary Jenner (England)	2–0	(Peru) Maria Caridad Romero	21–12	21–9	
Aug 7; 19:40	Renate Gabriel (Germany)	2–0	(England) Mary Jenner	21–16	21–11	

=== Group B ===
Pos	Team	Pld	W	L	GF	GA	GD	PF	PA	PD	Qualification
1	(Germany) Renate Knötzsch	2	2	0	4	1	+3	97	61	+36	Qualified to Semifinals
2	(Finland) Wiola Renholm	2	1	1	2	2	0	60	75	−15	Qualified to Semifinals
3	(England) Beryl Goodall	2	0	2	1	4	−3	76	97	−21	

Source: TS

Date		Score		Set 1	Set 2	Set 3
Aug 5; 14:30	Beryl Goodall (England)	0–2	(Finland) Wiola Renholm	16–21	17–21	
Aug 6; 13:50	Renate Knötzsch (Germany)	2–0	(Finland) Wiola Renholm	21–10	21–8	
Aug 7; 19:40	Beryl Goodall (England)	1–2	(Germany) Renate Knötzsch	9–21	21–13	13–21

=== Finals ===
Semifinals
1	(Germany) Renate Gabriel	21	21
(Finland) Wiola Renholm	9	15
(England) Mary Jenner	10	14
(Germany) Renate Knötzsch	21	21

Final
1	(Germany) Renate Gabriel	0
(Germany) Renate Knötzsch	0^{r}

== Men's doubles ==
=== Seeds ===
1. (Japan) Akira Hirota / Shinjiro Matsuda (bronze medalists)
2. (Poland) Paweł Gasz / Leopold Tukendorf (silver medalists)

=== Group A ===
Pos	Team	Pld	W	L	GF	GA	GD	PF	PA	PD	Qualification
1	(Japan) Akira Hirota (Japan) Shinjiro Matsuda	2	2	0	4	1	+3	102	68	+34	Qualified to Quarterfinals
2	(Germany) Matthias Kiefer (Germany) Wolfram Schatz	2	1	1	3	2	+1	96	84	+12	Qualified to Quarterfinals
3	(Finland) Osmo Peirsala (Finland) Osmo Perkinen	2	0	2	0	4	−4	38	84	−46	

Source: TS

Date		Score		Set 1	Set 2	Set 3
Aug 4; 16:30	Akira Hirota (Japan); Shinjiro Matsuda (Japan)	2–0	(Finland) Osmo Peitsala (Finland) Osmo Perkinen	21–6	21–8	
Aug 5; 14:30	Matthias Kiefer (Germany); Wolfram Schatz (Germany)	2–0	(Finland) Osmo Peitsala (Finland) Osmo Perkinen	21–11	21–13	
Aug 8; 13:50	Akira Hirota (Japan); Shinjiro Matsuda (Japan)	2–1	(Germany) Matthias Kiefer (Germany) Wolfram Schatz	18–21	21–16	21–17

=== Group B ===
Pos	Team	Pld	W	L	GF	GA	GD	PF	PA	PD	Qualification
1	(Germany) Heiner Hanrath (Germany) Michael Oversberg	3	3	0	6	0	+6	126	64	+62	Qualified to Quarterfinals
2	(Norway) Knut Sverre Liland (Finland) Kai Lohman	3	2	1	4	2	+2	106	90	+16	Qualified to Quarterfinals
3	(Poland) Czesław Gwiazda (Poland) Jerzy Stachowski	3	1	2	2	5	−3	101	142	−41	
4	(Belarus) Mikalai Sasimovich (Finland) Heikki Vilske	3	0	3	1	6	−5	107	144	−37	

Source: TS

Date		Score		Set 1	Set 2	Set 3
Aug 4; 14:30	Czesław Gwiazda (Poland); Jerzy Stachowski (Poland)	2–1	(Belarus) Mikalai Sasimovich (Finland) Kai Lohman	18–21	21–19	21–18
Aug 4; 16:30	Heiner Hanrath (Germany); Michael Oversberg (Germany)	2–0	(Norway) Knut Sverre Liland (Finland) Kai Lohman	21–10	21–12	
Aug 5; 14:30	Heiner Hanrath (Germany); Michael Oversberg (Germany)	2–0	(Belarus) Mikalai Sasimovich (Finland) Heikki Vilske	21–13	21–9	
Aug 5; 14:30	Czesław Gwiazda (Poland); Jerzy Stachowski (Poland)	0–2	(Norway) Knut Sverre Liland (Finland) Kai Lohman	9–21	12–21	
Aug 8; 13:50	Heiner Hanrath (Germany); Michael Oversberg (Germany)	2–0	(Poland) Czesław Gwiazda (Poland) Jerzy Stachowski	21–8	21–12	
Aug 8; 13:50	Mikalai Sasimovich (Belarus); Heikki Vilske (Finland)	0–2	(Norway) Knut Sverre Liland (Finland) Kai Lohman	8–21	19–21	

=== Group C ===
Pos	Team	Pld	W	L	GF	GA	GD	PF	PA	PD	Qualification
1	(Germany) Gerd Pflug (Germany) Dietmar Unser	3	3	0	6	1	+5	145	103	+42	Qualified to Quarterfinals
2	(Canada) Murray Peter Anthony Foubister (Denmark) Heine Johannesen	3	1	2	4	5	−1	158	178	−20	Qualified to Quarterfinals
3	(Sweden) Knut-Olof Åkesson (England) Roger Baldwin	3	1	2	3	5	−2	123	158	−35	
4	(France) Joseph Devesa (France) François Thomas	3	1	2	3	5	−2	153	140	+13	

Source: TS

Date		Score		Set 1	Set 2	Set 3
Aug 4; 14:30	Gerd Pflug (Germany); Dietmar Unser (Germany)	2–0	(France) Joseph Devesa (France) François Thomas	21–18	21–8	
Aug 4; 16:30	Murray Peter Anthony Foubister (Canada); Heine Johannesen (Denmark)	2–1	(Sweden) Knut-Olof Åkesson (England) Roger Baldwin	24–22	14–21	21–16
Aug 5; 14:30	Gerd Pflug (Germany); Dietmar Unser (Germany)	2–0	(Sweden) Knut-Olof Åkesson (England) Roger Baldwin	21–18	21–15	
Aug 5; 14:30	Murray Peter Anthony Foubister (Canada); Heine Johannesen (Denmark)	1–2	(France) Joseph Devesa (France) François Thomas	18–21	21–16	16–21
Aug 8; 13:50	Gerd Pflug (Germany); Dietmar Unser (Germany)	2–1	(Canada) Murray Peter Anthony Foubister (Denmark) Heine Johannesen	21–9	19–21	21–14
Aug 8; 13:50	Knut-Olof Åkesson (Sweden); Roger Baldwin (England)	2–1	(France) Joseph Devesa (France) François Thomas	21–6	19–21	21–12

=== Group D ===
Pos	Team	Pld	W	L	GF	GA	GD	PF	PA	PD	Qualification
1	(Poland) Paweł Gasz (Poland) Leopold Tukendorf	2	2	0	4	1	+3	93	66	+27	Qualified to Quarterfinals
2	(Germany) Peter Gerth (Germany) Hans Schumacher	2	1	1	3	2	+1	92	76	+16	Qualified to Quarterfinals
3	(Scotland) Leslie Frame (Canada) Junior Lauw	2	0	2	0	4	−4	41	84	−43	
4	(Finland) Kai Lohman (Finland) Jorma Wiberg	0	0	0	0	0	0	0	0	0	Withdrew

Source: TS

Date		Score		Set 1	Set 2	Set 3
Aug 4; 17:00	Paweł Gasz (Poland); Leopold Tukendorf (Poland)	2–0	(Scotland) Leslie Frame (Canada) Junior Lauw	21–7	21–9	
Aug 5; 14:30	Peter Gerth (Germany); Hans Schumacher (Germany)	2–0	(Scotland) Leslie Frame (Canada) Junior Lauw	21–13	21–12	
Aug 8; 13:50	Paweł Gasz (Poland); Leopold Tukendorf (Poland)	2–1	(Germany) Peter Gerth (Germany) Hans Schumacher	9–21	21–11	21–18

=== Finals ===
Quarterfinals
1	(Japan) Akira Hirota (Japan) Shinjiro Matsuda	21	21
(Germany) Peter Gerth (Germany) Hans Schumacher	18	13
SUB	(Norway) Knut Sverre Liland (Finland) Kai Lohman	12	15
(Germany) Gerd Pflug (Germany) Dietmar Unser	21	21
(Canada) Murray Peter Anthony Foubister (Denmark) Heine Johannesen	12	13
(Germany) Heiner Hanrath (Germany) Michael Oversberg	21	21
(Germany) Matthias Kiefer (Germany) Wolfram Schatz	15	21	11
2	(Poland) Paweł Gasz (Poland) Leopold Tukendorf	21	14	21

Semifinals
1	(Japan) Akira Hirota (Japan) Shinjiro Matsuda	21	17	18
(Germany) Gerd Pflug (Germany) Dietmar Unser	11	21	21
(Germany) Heiner Hanrath (Germany) Michael Oversberg	17	21	17
2	(Poland) Paweł Gasz (Poland) Leopold Tukendorf	21	12	21

Final
(Germany) Gerd Pflug (Germany) Dietmar Unser	13	21	21
2	(Poland) Paweł Gasz (Poland) Leopold Tukendorf	21	15	14

== Women's doubles ==
=== Seed ===
1. (England) Beryl Goodall / Mary Jenner (gold medalists)

=== Draw ===
Pos	Team	Pld	W	L	GF	GA	GD	PF	PA	PD	Results
1	(England) Beryl Goodall (England) Mary Jenner	2	2	0	4	1	+3	107	82	+25	Gold medalists
2	(Germany) Renate Hoppe (Germany) Christel Klaar	2	1	1	3	2	+1	97	91	+6	Silver medalists
3	(Sweden) Lisbeth Bengtsson (Finland) Wiola Renholm	2	0	2	0	4	−4	53	84	−31	Bronze medalists

Source: TS

Date		Score		Set 1	Set 2	Set 3
Aug 9; 13:40	Beryl Goodall (England); Mary Jenner (England)	2–1	(Germany) Renate Hoppe (Germany) Christel Klaar	21–12	23–25	21–18
Aug 10; 16:20	Lisbeth Bengtsson (Sweden); Wiola Renholm (Finland)	0–2	(Germany) Renate Hoppe (Germany) Christel Klaar	12–21	14–21	
Aug 11; 15:00	Beryl Goodall (England); Mary Jenner (England)	2–0	(Sweden) Lisbeth Bengtsson (Finland) Wiola Renholm	21–12	21–15	

== Mixed doubles ==
=== Seeds ===
1. (Poland) Paweł Gasz / (England) Beryl Goodall (silver medalists)
2. (Sweden) Knut-Olof Åkesson / (England) Mary Jenner (group stage)

=== Group A ===
Pos	Team	Pld	W	L	GF	GA	GD	PF	PA	PD	Qualification
1	(Poland) Paweł Gasz (England) Beryl Goodall	3	3	0	6	1	+5	145	103	+42	Qualified to Semifinals
2	(Germany) Wolfram Schatz (Germany) Renate Knötzsch	3	2	1	4	3	+1	130	122	+8	Qualified to Semifinals
3	(Germany) Wolfgang Schuch (Germany) Renate Hoppe	3	1	2	4	4	0	136	141	−5	
4	(Denmark) Heini Johannesen (Peru) Maria Caridad Romero	3	0	3	0	6	−6	81	126	−45	

Source: TS

Date		Score		Set 1	Set 2	Set 3
Aug 4; 11:00	Wolfram Schatz (Germany); Renate Knötzsch (Germany)	2–1	(Germany) Wolfgang Schuch (Germany) Renate Hoppe	12–21	21–10	21–18
Aug 4; 13:00	Paweł Gasz (Poland); Beryl Goodall (England)	2–0	(Denmark) Heini Johannesen (Peru) Maria Caridad Romero	21–15	21–9	
Aug 5; 09:00	Paweł Gasz (Poland); Beryl Goodall (England)	2–1	(Germany) Wolfgang Schuch (Germany) Renate Hoppe	19–21	21–12	21–12
Aug 5; 09:00	Wolfram Schatz (Germany); Renate Knötzsch (Germany)	2–0	(Denmark) Heini Johannesen (Peru) Maria Caridad Romero	21–17	21–14	
Aug 6; 08:00	Paweł Gasz (Poland); Beryl Goodall (England)	2–0	(Germany) Wolfram Schatz (Germany) Renate Knötzsch	21–17	21–17	
Aug 6; 08:00	Wolfgang Schuch (Germany); Renate Hoppe (Germany)	2–0	(Denmark) Heini Johannesen (Peru) Maria Caridad Romero	21–12	21–14	

=== Group B ===
Pos	Team	Pld	W	L	GF	GA	GD	PF	PA	PD	Qualification
1	(Germany) Hans Schumacher (Germany) Renate Gabriel	4	4	0	8	0	+8	168	103	+65	Qualified to Semifinals
2	(Germany) Peter Gerth (Germany) Christel Klaar	4	3	1	6	4	+2	192	163	+29	Qualified to Semifinals
3	(Norway) Knut Sverre Liland (Sweden) Lisbeth Bengtsson	4	2	2	5	5	0	181	182	−1	
4	(Finland) Osmo Perkinen (Finland) Tuula Vilske	4	1	3	4	6	−2	170	199	−29	
5	(Sweden) Knut-Olof Åkesson (England) Mary Jenner	4	0	4	0	8	−8	104	168	−64	

Source: TS

Date		Score		Set 1	Set 2	Set 3
Aug 4; 12:30	Hans Schumacher (Germany); Renate Gabriel (Germany)	2–0	(Finland) Osmo Perkinen (Finland) Tuula Vilske	21–13	21–11	
Aug 4; 12:30	Knut-Olof Åkesson (Sweden); Mary Jenner (England)	0–2	(Norway) Knut Sverre Liland (Sweden) Lisbeth Bengtsson	7–21	19–21	
Aug 5; 09:00	Knut-Olof Åkesson (Sweden); Mary Jenner (England)	0–2	(Finland) Osmo Perkinen (Finland) Tuula Vilske	17–21	18–21	
Aug 5; 09:00	Peter Gerth (Germany); Christel Klaar (Germany)	2–1	(Norway) Knut Sverre Liland (Sweden) Lisbeth Bengtsson	17–21	21–9	21–19
Aug 6; 08:00	Knut-Olof Åkesson (Sweden); Mary Jenner (England)	0–2	(Germany) Peter Gerth (Germany) Christel Klaar	11–21	12–21	
Aug 6; 08:00	Hans Schumacher (Germany); Renate Gabriel (Germany)	2–0	(Norway) Knut Sverre Liland (Sweden) Lisbeth Bengtsson	21–16	21–15	
Aug 7; 08:00	Hans Schumacher (Germany); Renate Gabriel (Germany)	2–0	(Germany) Peter Gerth (Germany) Christel Klaar	21–14	21–14	
Aug 7; 08:00	Osmo Perkinen (Finland); Tuula Vilske (Finland)	1–2	(Norway) Knut Sverre Liland (Sweden) Lisbeth Bengtsson	21–17	18–21	16–21
Aug 8; 17:55	Knut-Olof Åkesson (Sweden); Mary Jenner (England)	0–2	(Germany) Hans Schumacher (Germany) Renate Gabriel	8–21	12–21	
Aug 8; 17:55	Peter Gerth (Germany); Christel Klaar (Germany)	2–1	(Finland) Osmo Perkinen (Finland) Tuula Vilske	24–22	18–21	21–6

=== Finals ===
Semifinals
1	(Poland) Paweł Gasz (England) Beryl Goodall	21	21
(Germany) Wolfram Schatz (Germany) Renate Knötzsch	16	16
(Germany) Peter Gerth (Germany) Christel Klaar	21	16
(Germany) Hans Schumacher (Germany) Renate Gabriel	23	21

Final
1	(Poland) Paweł Gasz (England) Beryl Goodall	21	15	16
(Germany) Hans Schumacher (Germany) Renate Gabriel	19	21	21
