= John Sorenson =

John Sorenson or John Sörenson may refer to:

- John Sörenson (1889–1976), Swedish gymnast
- John L. Sorenson (1924-2021), American professor of anthropology

== See also ==
- Sorenson (disambiguation)
