= Sorensen =

Sorensen, or Sorenson, is a surname of Danish origin. The basic derivation is "son of Søren", the Danish variety of the name Severin. The name almost exclusively comes from Danish or Norwegian emigrants named Sørensen who altered the spelling of their names when they moved to countries outside Scandinavia whose orthographies do not use the letter ø.

Notable people with this surname include:

- Albert Sorensen (born 1932), American politician
- Alfred Sorensen, Danish mystic, horticulturalist and writer who lived in Europe, India and the US
- Arne Sørensen, Danish politician and writer
- Arne Sørensen, Danish footballer and coach
- Anders Sørensen, Danish professional golfer
- Anders Sörensen, Swedish ice hockey coach
- Asger Sørensen (born 1996), Danish footballer
- Bill Sorensen, New Zealand rugby league footballer
- Carrie Sorensen, American politician
- Charles E. Sorensen, Danish-American, one of the principals of the Ford Motor Company during its first four decades
- Christian A. Sorensen (1890–1959), American politician
- Dane Sorensen, New Zealand rugby league footballer
- Daniel Sorensen, New Orleans Saints strong safety
- Edward Sorenson (1869–1939), Australian poet
- Eric Sorensen (journalist), Canadian journalist
- Eric Sorensen (politician), American politician
- Erik Sørensen, Danish footballer
- Frederik Sørensen (born 1992), Danish footballer
- Gerry Sorensen, Canadian alpine skier
- Gillian Sorensen, American member of the United Nations Foundation
- Harry Sørensen (disambiguation)
- Ib Holm Sørensen (1949–2012), Danish computer scientist
- Ingeborg Søresen (born 1948), Norwegian actress and Miss Norway 1972
- James Sorensen (born 1986), Australian actor and model
- James LeVoy Sorenson, American businessman and philanthropist
- Jen Sorensen, American cartoonist
- Jesse Sorensen, American professional wrestler
- Jonathan Sorensen, American sociologist and criminologist
- Kent Sorenson, American politician
- Kurt Sorensen, New Zealand rugby league footballer
- Kyle Sorensen, lacrosse player
- Lary Sorensen, American baseball player
- Louk Sorensen (born 1985), Irish tennis player, son of Sean Sorensen
- Marc Sorenson, American researcher on health and fitness
- Max Sorensen, Irish cricketer
- Nick Sorensen, American football player
- Poul Sørensen, multiple persons
- Rebecca Sorensen (born 1972), American skeleton racer
- Reed Sorenson, American race car driver
- Reginald Sorensen, Baron Sorensen, British politician
- Rosemary Sorensen (born 1954), Australian art critic
- Sean Sorensen (born 1955), Irish tennis player, father of Louk Sorensen
- Søren Sørensen (1868–1939), Danish chemist
- Ted Sorensen, American presidential counsel, speechwriter, and political author; husband of Gillian
- T. E. Sorenson, American farmer and politician
- Thomas Sørensen (born 1976), Danish international football goalkeeper
- Tom Sorensen, American volleyball player
- Tonny Sorensen, CEO of Von Dutch
- Tracy Sorensen (1963–2025), Australian novelist, filmmaker, and academic
- Virginia Sorensen (1912–1991), American author
- Zach Sorensen (born 1977), American baseball player

== Other uses ==
- Sorenson codec, the internal video codec used by QuickTime
- Sorenson Molecular Genealogy Foundation
