= Sorenson =

Sorenson may refer to:

- Sorensen, a surname
- Sorenson codec, digital video coder-decoder
- Sorenson Glacier, Antarctica
- Sorenson Media, an American company
