= Peter Sørensen =

Peter Sørensen may refer to:

- Peter Sørensen Vig (1854–1929), Danish American pastor, educator, and historian
- Peter Sørensen (footballer) (born 1973), Danish footballer
- Peter Sørensen (diplomat) (born 1967), Danish politician, the European Union Special Representative to Bosnia and Herzegovina
