= Marc Sorenson =

American academic

Dr. Marc Sorenson is a doctor of education with a background in health and fitness. He graduated from Brigham Young University in 1973. He and his wife, Vicki, founded and developed National Institute of Fitness in 1974. Dr. Sorenson and Vicki sold the resort to Franklin Quest (now Franklin Covey) corporation in 1994. They are currently directors of another health resort called National Institute of Health and Fitness (NIHF) in Midway, Utah.

Dr. Sorenson has published a scientific paper in the journal Dermatoendocrinology, on Vitamin D and erectile dysfunction (ED), theorizing that lack of vitamin D or sunlight could be a contributor to ED. He was also co-author of a scientific paper on vitamin D and athletics, published in Science and Medicine in Exercise and Sports, and coauthored another paper in the Journal of Sexual Medicine regarding ED, chronic periodontitis and vitamin D.

His book Megahealth was a selection of the Literary Guild, Doubleday Book Club and Doubleday Health Book Club. He has done meticulous and extensive research into hundreds of published papers on sunlight, vitamin D and health in order to write his current book, Vitamin D3 and Solar Power. The book has also been published in both the Czech Republic and Israel. He has written several other books, including an English vocabulary builder, “I Want to have words with you!”

He was also named a founding director of the Breast Cancer Natural Prevention Foundation (BCNPF).
