= Tommy Sørensen =

Danish badminton player

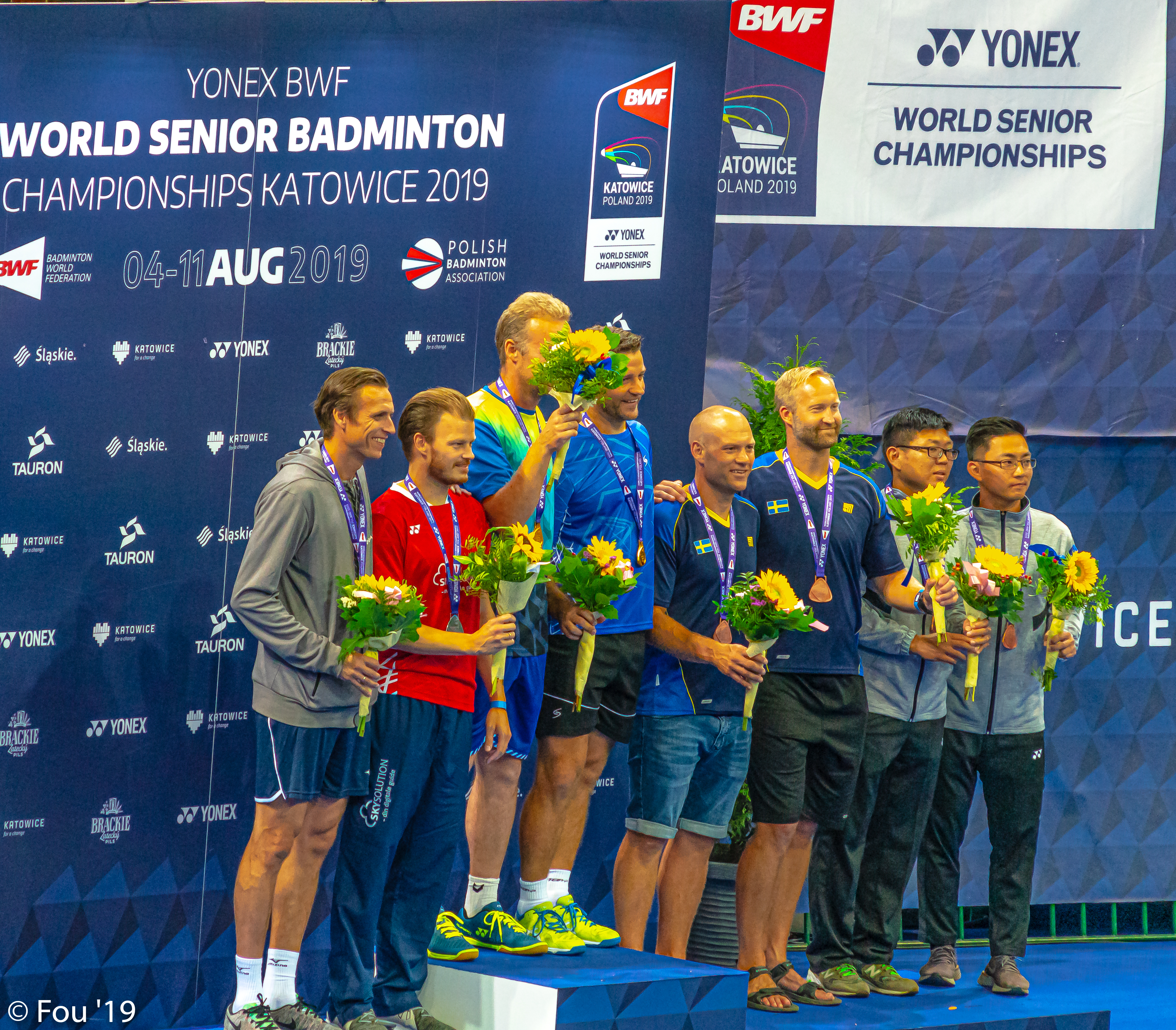
- Tommy Sørensen (middle) with gold medal

Personal information
- Born: 1 April 1979 (age 47)

Sport
- Country: Denmark
- Sport: Badminton
- Handedness: Right

Doubles
- Highest ranking: 12 (in MD with Jesper Thomsen)
- BWF profile
Medal record
Men's badminton
Representing Denmark
World Senior Championships
Gold medal – first place	2015 Helsingborg	Mixed doubles 35+
Gold medal – first place	2019 Katowice	Men's doubles 35+
Gold medal – first place	2019 Katowice	Mixed doubles 35+

Tommy Sørensen (born 1 April 1979) is a Danish badminton player from Triton Aalborg Club. Sørensen is a triple World Senior Champion, having won title in men's doubles and twice in mixed doubles events.

Sørensen started playing badminton at the age of 3 and won 2 youth titles in his teens. He was particularly successful in the year 2001 when he won titles in Scotland, Norway and Slovakia. He became World Senior Champion for the first time in 2015 by winning title in mixed doubles discipline. In 2019 he became World Champion again in mixed doubles and men's doubles categories. He currently works as a Tail Inspector in Løgstrup in daily basis and trains in the badminton club Triton in Aalborg playing in 1st division badminton for the club.

== Achievements ==
=== World Senior Championships ===
Men's doubles

Year	Venue	Event	Partner	Opponent	Score	Result
2019	Spodek, Katowice, Poland	Men's doubles 35+	(Denmark) Jesper Thomsen	(Denmark) Casper Lund (Denmark) Niels Christian Blittrup	21–18, 21–19	Gold

Mixed doubles

Year	Venue	Event	Partner	Opponent	Score	Result
2019	Spodek, Katowice, Poland	Mixed doubles 35+	(Denmark) Lisbeth T. Haagensen	(Thailand) Atipong Kitjanon (Thailand) Molthila Kitjanon	21–11, 15–21, 21–15	Gold
2015	Helsingborg Arena, Helsingborg, Sweden	Mixed doubles 35+	(Denmark) Lisbeth T. Haagensen	(Germany) Thorsten Hukriede (Germany) Michaela Hukriede	21–17, 21–12	Gold

=== IBF Grand Prix ===
The World Badminton Grand Prix has been sanctioned by the International Badminton Federation since 1983.

Men's doubles
Year	Tournament	Partner	Opponent	Score	Result
2003	Dutch Open	(Denmark) Jesper Thomsen	(Denmark) Carsten Mogensen (Denmark) Rasmus Andersen	12–15, 11–15	(silver) Runner-up

Mixed doubles
Year	Tournament	Partner	Opponent	Score	Result
2004	Dutch Open	(Denmark) Britta Andersen	(France) Svetoslav Stoyanov (France) Victoria Wright	15–8, 8–15, 8–15	(silver) Runner-up

=== IBF International ===
Men's doubles
Year	Tournament	Partner	Opponent	Score	Result
2003	Bulgarian International	(Denmark) Thomas Røjkjær Jensen	(Russia) Alexandr Shchepalkin (Russia) Evgenij Isakov	12–15, 15–4, 15–10	(gold) Winner
2003	Czech International	(Denmark) Thomas Røjkjær Jensen	(France) Manuel Dubrulle (France) Mihail Popov	10–15, 3–15	(silver) Runner-up
2002	Polish International	(Denmark) Jesper Thomsen	(Poland) Michał Łogosz (Poland) Robert Mateusiak	7–1, 3–7, 3–7, 7–3, 3–7	(silver) Runner-up
2002	Scottish International	(Denmark) Jesper Thomsen	(Denmark) Jesper Christensen (Denmark) Jesper Larsen	6–15, 9–15	(silver) Runner-up
2001	Scottish International	(Denmark) Jesper Thomsen	(Canada) Kyle Hunter (Canada) Mike Beres	7–3, 7–0, 7–0	(gold) Winner
2001	Slovak International	(Denmark) Jesper Thomsen	(Scotland) Graeme Smith (Scotland) Graham Simpson	7–2, 7–2, 7–3	(gold) Winner
1999	Norwegian International	(Denmark) Thomas Røjkjær Jensen	(South Korea) Yim Bang-eun (South Korea) Kim Yong-hyun	4–15, 9–15	(silver) Runner-up

Mixed doubles
Year	Tournament	Partner	Opponent	Score	Result
2001	Norwegian International	(Denmark) Karina Sørensen	(Sweden) Jörgen Olsson (Sweden) Frida Andreasson	2–7, 8–7, 7–5, ?, ?	(gold) Winner
