= Sigurd Torbjørn Sørensen =

Norwegian painter

- Born: 7 September 1901; Antwerp, Belgium
- Died: 1981 (aged 79–80)
- Occupation: Painter
- Spouse: Gunvor Sørensen

Sigurd Torbjørn Sørensen (1901–1981) was a Norwegian painter known for his landscapes and early portraits. He was born on September 7, 1901, in Antwerp, Belgium, and in 1914, he moved with his family to Norway, where his parents were originally from.

== Early life and education ==
Sørensen's artistic talent was evident from a young age, and his early drawings are still preserved at his school in Antwerp. He received his first art education under the tutelage of Professor Wefring, after which he enrolled in the Oslo School for Arts and Crafts. To complete his education, he became a disciple of Carl von Hanno, Leon Aurdal, and Per Krohg.

== Contribution to art ==
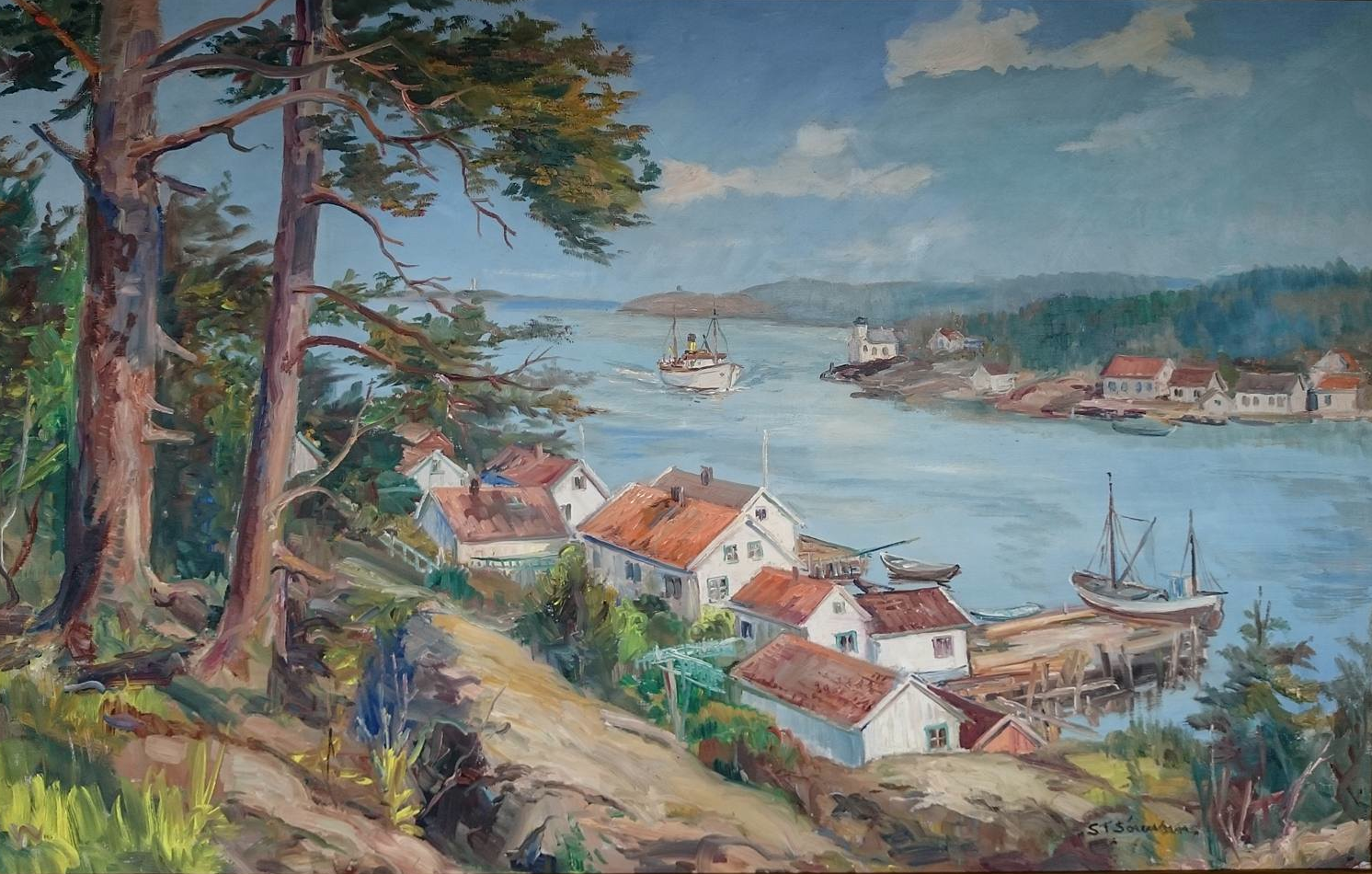
One of the Sørensen's most beautiful landscapes

Sørensen is best known for his Norwegian landscape paintings, particularly his "Forest Insides" series, which depicts streams, quiet waters, lush vegetation, and powerful trunks in a harmonious unity with the Norwegian countryside. His works were frequently exhibited at Blomqvist Art Trading in Oslo.

During Sørensen's career, Norway was experiencing a period of artistic development known as the "Golden Age" of Norwegian painting. This period, which spanned the late 19th and early 20th centuries, saw a flourishing of Norwegian artists who were exploring new techniques and styles, drawing inspiration from both the Norwegian landscape and international art movements. Sørensen's work is considered to be part of this broader trend of Norwegian artistic innovation.
