= Harry Sørensen =

Harry Sørensen may refer to:

- Harry Sorensen (basketball) (1914–1991), American professional basketball player
- Harry Sørensen (canoeist) (1946–2015), Danish sprint canoer
- Harry Sørensen (gymnast) (1892–1963), Danish gymnast
