= 2019 BWF World Senior Championships =

Tournament details
- Dates: 4–11 August
- Edition: 9th
- Level: International
- Competitors: 1436 from 55 nations
- Venue: Spodek
- Location: Katowice, Poland

The 2019 BWF World Senior Championships, officially YONEX BWF World Senior Badminton Championships Katowice 2019, was a badminton tournament which was held from 4 to 11 August 2019 at Spodek in Katowice, Poland.

== Participants ==
Conf.	Nation	35+					40+					45+					50+					55+					60+					65+					70+					75+					Entries	Players
Conf.	Nation	MS	WS	MD	WD	XD	MS	WS	MD	WD	XD	MS	WS	MD	WD	XD	MS	WS	MD	WD	XD	MS	WS	MD	WD	XD	MS	WS	MD	WD	XD	MS	WS	MD	WD	XD	MS	WS	MD	WD	XD	MS	WS	MD	WD	XD	Entries	Players
Africa	South Africa																					1			0.5	1											1		0.5								4	3
Africa	Uganda	1																																													1	1
Asia	Bahrain								1		0.5								1			1							0.5																		4	5
Asia	China																											1		0.5	0.5																2	1
Asia	Chinese Taipei	4		1						1	1	1	1	1	1		1		1			2		1		1						1															18	19
Asia	Hong Kong					1																	1		0.5	0.5	1		0.5		0.5																5	4
Asia	India	3	3	4	4	4	3	4	4	3	3	4	2	4	3	4	4	4	4	4	3	3	4	4	4	3	4	3	3	1.5	2	2	4	2	2	4	2	1	2		1	2					124.5	149
Asia	Indonesia											1							1.5		1			0.5		0.5	1							0.5													6	7
Asia	Japan	4	2	1	1	2	4	2	2	3	4	4	4	3	1	4		1		1	0.5	2		1	1	2	2	2	1	1	1.5	3	1	1	1	2	1	3	1	2	3	2		1			78	50
Asia	Malaysia																		0.5								4		2		0.5	3		2			1		1.5		0.5	1					16	12
Asia	Nepal			1			1																																								2	2
Asia	South Korea											1			1	1			1					1	1	2			1		1																10	11
Asia	Sri Lanka						3	1	4	0.5		3		1			4					1		0.5								1		0.5													18.5	18
Asia	Thailand		1	1		1	1						1	2	1	2	3		1	1		4		4		2	3	1	3	1	2	1		4		1	2		2			2					47	49
Asia	United Arab Emirates		1		1	1	3		1	1	1.5	1		3	1	1	2	1	1.5		2						3		1.5																		26.5	24
Europe	Austria	4		2.5			4	1	1.5	0.5	2	2		1.5		1.5	2		0.5			3		2		0.5	2		0.5								2		1								34	22
Europe	Azerbaijan																										1		0.5																		1.5	1
Europe	Belarus																					1		1			1															1		0.5			4.5	3
Europe	Belgium						1		0.5	0.5	1.5		1		1	0.5	2	2	1	1	2	3		1		0.5	1		1									1			0.5						22	14
Europe	Bulgaria		1						1		0.5																																				2.5	4
Europe	Croatia															0.5	1		0.5																												2	1
Europe	Czech Republic		1		0.5	1	2		2			3		2			3		0.5			4		2.5			3		1			1		1			1		0.5								29	20
Europe	Denmark	4	2	3	3	3.5	4		3		3.5	4	4	3	2.5	4	4		3	2.5	4	4	2	3.5	2	2	4		2.5		2	4		4	0.5	2	4	3	2	2	3.5	1		0.5		0.5	106	77
Europe	England	4	2	3.5	2	3.5	4	3	4	2.5	4	4	2	4	4	4	4	4	4	4	4	3	4	4	4	4	4	4	4	4	4	4	4	4	3	4	3		3.5	4	4	1	2	0.5	1	1	148.5	124
Europe	Estonia	1					1		2		1	3	1		2	2	2		1	1	2.5			1			2		1			1															24.5	18
Europe	Finland	4	1	2	1	2	4	2	3	2	4	4		3.5			4	3	4	1	3	4		4		1	1		2	1	2.5	1	1	1	1.5	1	2	1	0.5	1	2	4	1	2	0.5	1	83.5	68
Europe	France	3	4	3	4	4	4	3	4	2	4	4	3	4	4	4	4	4	4	3	4	4	4	3	4	4	4	3	3	2.5	4	3	1	2	1	3		1				2		1			122.5	105
Europe	Germany	4	3	3.5	3	4	4	4	4	4	4	4	4	4	4	4	4	4	4	3	4	4	4	4	4	3.5	4	4	4	3.5	3.5	4	4	3	3	2	4	3	4	2.5	4	4	2	4	1	4	163.5	148
Europe	Greece																	1																													1	1
Europe	Hungary										0.5		1																																		1.5	1
Europe	Iceland					0.5				1	0.5																																				2	2
Europe	Ireland																1		1.5	1	2	1	1	0.5	1	1								0.5													10.5	9
Europe	Israel	1		0.5								1	1	0.5	0.5	1												1		0.5							1		0.5								8.5	5
Europe	Italy		1			1	1		1			2															1																				7	5
Europe	Latvia	2	1	1		1	3		2			3			1	2	1		1			1																									19	13
Europe	Lithuania									1	2	2		2			1		1		0.5	2		1		1																					13.5	11
Europe	Luxembourg							1																		0.5																					1.5	2
Europe	Moldova											1										1		1					1								1										5	6
Europe	Netherlands										0.5	1	2	0.5	1	1			0.5			1	3		1.5	2.5	1					1							0.5		0.5						17.5	10
Europe	Norway	1	1	1	0.5		3	2	1	1.5	2	4	1	2.5	1	3.5	2	2	1	1	1.5	1		0.5			1					2		0.5								1		0.5		0.5	39.5	24
Europe	Poland (H)	4	4	4	4	4	4	4	4	4	4	4	4	4	4	4	4	4	4	3	4	3	2	3	2	2	4	1	4	1	3	4	1	3		1	4		1.5			4		2		0.5	125	117
Europe	Portugal						2		0.5			2	3	1	1.5	2	1				1		2		1	0.5	1	1	0.5	0.5	1																21.5	12
Europe	Romania									0.5	0.5																																				1	1
Europe	Russia	3		2.5		0.5	1	1		0.5	1	4		4	1	2	1		1		0.5	2	2			1.5	3	1	1.5	1	1.5	1	1	0.5	1	1	1		0.5		0.5						42	35
Europe	Scotland		1		0.5	0.5	2		1.5		1.5	2	1	1	1	0.5		1	0.5	1	1	1	1	1	0.5	1.5	1	1	0.5		1.5						1		0.5			1		0.5			28	18
Europe	Slovakia	2	2	1	2.5	2	4	1	2.5		3	4		3			3	3	1	1.5	3						1		0.5										0.5			1					41.5	26
Europe	Slovenia											1							0.5																												1.5	2
Europe	Spain	1		1			2				1	4		2		1	1	1	1	1		1				1							1														19	16
Europe	Sweden	4	4	3.5	3	4	4	2	4	1.5	4	4	4	4	3.5	4	4	4	4	1.5	4	4		4	1	3	4	1	3.5	1	2.5	3	2	3	1.5	4	3	2	1	1	0.5	2		0.5	0.5	1	120	89
Europe	Switzerland	3	1	2	1	3.5	4	4	2.5	2	3	3	2	1	1	2.5	3	2	2	0.5	2	3	1	1	1	1.5	3		1.5		0.5				0.5		1		0.5	0.5	1.5						61.5	39
Europe	Ukraine	1	1			1	2	1	1	1	1	2	1	0.5			1			1	1.5	2	1	2		1.5	2				1	1															26.5	20
Oceania	Australia																										1										1		0.5								2.5	2
Pan Am	Canada																					1										2	1	0.5		1.5	1		0.5		0.5	2		1			11	7
Pan Am	Peru																																										1			0.5	1.5	1
Pan Am	United States																																1			0.5											1.5	1
Total (55 NOCs)		58	37	42	31	45	74	36	57	33	59	87	43	62	41	56	67	41	53	33	51	68	32	52	29	45	68	24	45	19	35	43	22	33	15	27	37	15	25	13	22	31	6	14	3	9	1738	1435

== Medal summary ==
=== Medal table ===
* Host nation (Poland)

2019 BWF World Senior Championships medal table
Rank	Nation	Gold	Silver	Bronze	Total
1	Germany	8.5	4	14	26.5
2	England	6	5.5	18	29.5
3	Japan	5	6	10	21
4	Denmark	4	9.5	12	25.5
5	Thailand	4	2	4	10
6	Chinese Taipei	2	2	1	5
7	Netherlands	2	1	1.5	4.5
8	Sweden	1.5	0.5	3.5	5.5
9	Israel	1.5	0	0	1.5
9	South Africa	1.5	0	0	1.5
11	India	1	2	4	7
12	Russia	1	2	2	5
13	France	1	1	2	4
14	Norway	1	1	0.5	2.5
15	Indonesia	1	0	0.5	1.5
16	Hong Kong	1	0	0	1
16	Iceland	1	0	0	1
16	Malaysia	1	0	0	1
19	Scotland	0.5	2	1	3.5
20	Finland	0.5	0	1.5	2
21	Poland*	0	4.5	2	6.5
22	Canada	0	1	2	3
23	Sri Lanka	0	1	0.5	1.5
24	Switzerland	0	0	3	3
25	Portugal	0	0	2	2
26	Hungary	0	0	1	1
26	Ireland	0	0	1	1
26	Luxembourg	0	0	1	1
26	Ukraine	0	0	1	1
Totals (29 entries)		45	45	89	179

=== Medalists ===
Event	Gold	Silver	Bronze
35+
Men's singles	(Japan) Hirofumi Fujino	(Chinese Taipei) Chao Chun-ken	(Germany) Philip Droste
Men's singles	(Japan) Hirofumi Fujino	(Chinese Taipei) Chao Chun-ken	(Russia) Anatoly Petelin
Women's singles	(Thailand) Molthila Kitjanon	(France) Perrine Le Buhanic	(Switzerland) Ava Monney
Women's singles	(Thailand) Molthila Kitjanon	(France) Perrine Le Buhanic	(England) Joanna Dix
Men's doubles	(Denmark) Tommy Sørensen (Denmark) Jesper Thomsen	(Denmark) Niels Christian Blittrup (Denmark) Casper Lund	(Chinese Taipei) Chen Chien-kuang (Chinese Taipei) Tsai Ming-wei
Men's doubles	(Denmark) Tommy Sørensen (Denmark) Jesper Thomsen	(Denmark) Niels Christian Blittrup (Denmark) Casper Lund	(Sweden) Jens Marmsten (Sweden) Dennis von Dahn
Women's doubles	(France) Hélène Dijoux (France) Audrey Petit	(England) Sarah Burgess (England) Joanna Dix	(Denmark) Lisbeth T. Haagensen (Denmark) Helle Kæmpegaard
Women's doubles	(France) Hélène Dijoux (France) Audrey Petit	(England) Sarah Burgess (England) Joanna Dix	(Germany) Monja Ehlert (Germany) Gesa Weise
Mixed doubles	(Denmark) Tommy Sørensen (Denmark) Lisbeth T. Haagensen	(Thailand) Atipong Kitjanon (Thailand) Molthila Kitjanon	(England) Mark King (England) Mhairi Armstrong
Mixed doubles	(Denmark) Tommy Sørensen (Denmark) Lisbeth T. Haagensen	(Thailand) Atipong Kitjanon (Thailand) Molthila Kitjanon	(Germany) Jens Ehlert (Germany) Monja Ehlert
40+
Men's singles	(Germany) Thorsten Hukriede	(Japan) Hosemari Fujimoto	(Switzerland) Oliver Colin
Men's singles	(Germany) Thorsten Hukriede	(Japan) Hosemari Fujimoto	(Switzerland) Conrad Hückstädt
Women's singles	(Germany) Claudia Vogelgsang	(Sri Lanka) Chandrika de Silva	(Luxembourg) Elena Nozdran
Women's singles	(Germany) Claudia Vogelgsang	(Sri Lanka) Chandrika de Silva	(Japan) Rie Matsumoto
Men's doubles	(India) Ajit Haridas (India) Vijay Lancy Mascarenhas	(Denmark) Esben B. Kæmpegaard (Denmark) Morten Eilby Rasmussen	(France) Xavier Engrand (France) Jerome Krawczyk
Men's doubles	(India) Ajit Haridas (India) Vijay Lancy Mascarenhas	(Denmark) Esben B. Kæmpegaard (Denmark) Morten Eilby Rasmussen	(Denmark) Lars Klintrup (Scotland) Mark Mackay
Women's doubles	(Iceland) Erla Björg Hafsteinsdóttir (Iceland) Drífa Harðardóttir	(Norway) Helene Abusdal (Sweden) Katja Wengberg	(Germany) Simone Galla (Germany) Annette Grohmann
Women's doubles	(Iceland) Erla Björg Hafsteinsdóttir (Iceland) Drífa Harðardóttir	(Norway) Helene Abusdal (Sweden) Katja Wengberg	(Sri Lanka) Chandrika de Silva (Germany) Claudia Vogelgsang
Mixed doubles	(Japan) Hosemari Fujimoto (Japan) Rie Matsumoto	(England) Carl Jennings (England) Rebecca Pantaney	(Germany) Thorsten Hukriede (Germany) Michaela Hukriede
Mixed doubles	(Japan) Hosemari Fujimoto (Japan) Rie Matsumoto	(England) Carl Jennings (England) Rebecca Pantaney	(Japan) Masayuki Matsumoto (Japan) Nami Fukui
45+
Men's singles	(Chinese Taipei) Liao Lien-sheng	(Poland) Dariusz Zięba	(France) Christophe Lionne
Men's singles	(Chinese Taipei) Liao Lien-sheng	(Poland) Dariusz Zięba	(Portugal) Fernando Silva
Women's singles	(Netherlands) Georgy van Soerland-Trouerbach	(Chinese Taipei) Shü Yuh-ling	(Hungary) Csilla Fórián
Women's singles	(Netherlands) Georgy van Soerland-Trouerbach	(Chinese Taipei) Shü Yuh-ling	(Japan) Nami Fukui
Men's doubles	(Sweden) Mikael Nilsson (Sweden) Ulf Svensson	(Denmark) Morten Aarup (Denmark) Carsten Loesch	(Thailand) Wittaya Panomchai (Thailand) Pracha Wannawichitr
Men's doubles	(Sweden) Mikael Nilsson (Sweden) Ulf Svensson	(Denmark) Morten Aarup (Denmark) Carsten Loesch	(India) Jaseel P. Ismail (India) Jaison Xavier
Women's doubles	(Netherlands) Marielle van der Woerdt (Netherlands) Georgy van Soerland-Trouerbach	(Russia) Natalia Gonchar (Russia) Olga Kuznetsova	(Denmark) Majken Asmussen (Scotland) Lynne Campbell
Women's doubles	(Netherlands) Marielle van der Woerdt (Netherlands) Georgy van Soerland-Trouerbach	(Russia) Natalia Gonchar (Russia) Olga Kuznetsova	(Denmark) Christina Rindshøj (Denmark) Dorte Steenberg
Mixed doubles	(Russia) Vadim Nazarov (Russia) Olga Kuznetsova	(Denmark) Morten Aarup (Denmark) Lene Struwe Andersen	(Denmark) Carsten Loesch (Denmark) Dorte Steenberg
Mixed doubles	(Russia) Vadim Nazarov (Russia) Olga Kuznetsova	(Denmark) Morten Aarup (Denmark) Lene Struwe Andersen	(Portugal) Fernando Silva (Portugal) Maria Gomes
50+
Men's singles	(Chinese Taipei) Wu Chang-jun	(Poland) Jacek Hankiewicz	(India) B. V. S. K. Lingeswara Rao
Men's singles	(Chinese Taipei) Wu Chang-jun	(Poland) Jacek Hankiewicz	(Sweden) Joakim Nordgren
Women's singles	(England) Caroline Hale	(Japan) Kumiko Kushiyama	(Germany) Tanja Eberl
Women's singles	(England) Caroline Hale	(Japan) Kumiko Kushiyama	(Poland) Dorota Grzejdak
Men's doubles	(Thailand) Wattana Ampunsuwan (Thailand) Narong Vanichitsarakul	(Denmark) Peter Busch-Jensen (Denmark) Bo Sorensen	(Poland) Jerzy Dołhan (Poland) Jacek Hankiewicz
Men's doubles	(Thailand) Wattana Ampunsuwan (Thailand) Narong Vanichitsarakul	(Denmark) Peter Busch-Jensen (Denmark) Bo Sorensen	(Denmark) Jean Christensen (Denmark) Henrik Lykke
Women's doubles	(Japan) Kumiko Kushiyama (Japan) Ritsuko Sato	(England) Elizabeth Austin (England) Caroline Hale	(Sweden) Tanja Karlsson (Norway) Berit Thyness
Women's doubles	(Japan) Kumiko Kushiyama (Japan) Ritsuko Sato	(England) Elizabeth Austin (England) Caroline Hale	(Denmark) Lise Lotte Bilgrav (Denmark) Gitte Kruse
Mixed doubles	(England) Rajeev Bagga (England) Elizabeth Austin	(India) Prabhu Naik Naidu Kona (India) Suzanne Venglet	(Ukraine) Oleksandr Tsyhankov (Ukraine) Viktoriya Pron
Mixed doubles	(England) Rajeev Bagga (England) Elizabeth Austin	(India) Prabhu Naik Naidu Kona (India) Suzanne Venglet	(Denmark) Morten Christensen (Denmark) Hanne Bertelsen
55+
Men's singles	(Norway) Geir Olve Storvik	(Russia) Sergey Razuvaykin	(Denmark) Martin Qvist Olesen
Men's singles	(Norway) Geir Olve Storvik	(Russia) Sergey Razuvaykin	(Canada) Keith Priestman
Women's singles	(Hong Kong) Zhou Xin	(India) Manjusha Sudhir Sahasrabudhe	(England) Cathy Jane Bargh
Women's singles	(Hong Kong) Zhou Xin	(India) Manjusha Sudhir Sahasrabudhe	(Netherlands) Jeannette van der Werff
Men's doubles	(Thailand) Chaiwat Chaloempusitarak (Thailand) Mongkol Gumlaitong	(Denmark) Henrik Madsen (Norway) Geir Olve Storvik	(Thailand) Surachai Makkasasithorn (Thailand) Nattapol Sanlekanun
Men's doubles	(Thailand) Chaiwat Chaloempusitarak (Thailand) Mongkol Gumlaitong	(Denmark) Henrik Madsen (Norway) Geir Olve Storvik	(Thailand) Pornroj Banditpisut (Thailand) Bovornovadep Devakula
Women's doubles	(Germany) Ilona Kienitz (Germany) Petra Teichmann	(Netherlands) Sandra Kroon (Netherlands) Jeannette van der Werff	(Japan) Harumi Marui (Japan) Chizuyo Nitabaru
Women's doubles	(Germany) Ilona Kienitz (Germany) Petra Teichmann	(Netherlands) Sandra Kroon (Netherlands) Jeannette van der Werff	(Republic of Ireland) Pamela Peard (Republic of Ireland) Sian Williams
Mixed doubles	(Sweden) Magnus Nytell (Denmark) Helle Sjørring	(Germany) Jürgen Schmitz-Foster (Germany) Petra Teichmann	(Indonesia) Bobby Ertanto (Germany) Heidi Bender
Mixed doubles	(Sweden) Magnus Nytell (Denmark) Helle Sjørring	(Germany) Jürgen Schmitz-Foster (Germany) Petra Teichmann	(Denmark) Jan Bertram Petersen (Netherlands) Jeannette van der Werff
60+
Men's singles	(Indonesia) Arnold Dendeng	(Scotland) Dan Travers	(Russia) Yuri Smirnov
Men's singles	(Indonesia) Arnold Dendeng	(Scotland) Dan Travers	(Denmark) Per Juul
Women's singles	(Israel) Svetlana Zilberman	(Germany) Heidi Bender	(Japan) Kuniko Yamamoto
Women's singles	(Israel) Svetlana Zilberman	(Germany) Heidi Bender	(Japan) Sugako Morita
Men's doubles	(Denmark) Jesper Helledie (Scotland) Dan Travers	(Denmark) Per Juul (Denmark) Birger Steenberg	(Thailand) Sarit Pisudchaikul (Thailand) Chongsak Suvanich
Men's doubles	(Denmark) Jesper Helledie (Scotland) Dan Travers	(Denmark) Per Juul (Denmark) Birger Steenberg	(England) John Molyneux (England) Ian M. Purton
Women's doubles	(Germany) Heidi Bender (Israel) Svetlana Zilberman	(Japan) Sugako Morita (Japan) Kuniko Yamamoto	(England) Anne C. Bridge (England) Christina Davies
Women's doubles	(Germany) Heidi Bender (Israel) Svetlana Zilberman	(Japan) Sugako Morita (Japan) Kuniko Yamamoto	(England) Jenny Cox (England) Christine M. Crossley
Mixed doubles	(England) Ian M. Purton (England) Christine M. Crossley	(Scotland) Dan Travers (Scotland) Christine Black	(England) Roger Taylor (England) Andi Stretch
Mixed doubles	(England) Ian M. Purton (England) Christine M. Crossley	(Scotland) Dan Travers (Scotland) Christine Black	(England) Philip Ian Richardson (England) Jackie Hurst
65+
Men's singles	(Malaysia) Bruni Garip	(Japan) Seiji Yamamoto	(Canada) Henry Paynter
Men's singles	(Malaysia) Bruni Garip	(Japan) Seiji Yamamoto	(England) Graham Michael Robinson
Women's singles	(Germany) Marie-Luise Schulta-Jansen	(England) Christine M. Crossley	(England) Marguerite Butt
Women's singles	(Germany) Marie-Luise Schulta-Jansen	(England) Christine M. Crossley	(England) Betty Bartlett
Men's doubles	(Denmark) Jeppe Skov Jespen (Denmark) Per Mikkelsen	(Thailand) Jiamsak Panitchaikul (Thailand) Prapatana Vasavid	(England) Peter Emptage (England) John Gardner
Men's doubles	(Denmark) Jeppe Skov Jespen (Denmark) Per Mikkelsen	(Thailand) Jiamsak Panitchaikul (Thailand) Prapatana Vasavid	(India) Sushil Kumar Patet (India) Surendra Singh Pundir
Women's doubles	(England) Marguerite Butt (England) Brenda Creasey	(England) Betty Bartlett (England) Eileen M. Carley	(Denmark) Gitte Attle Rasmussen (Sweden) Lieselotte Wengberg
Women's doubles	(England) Marguerite Butt (England) Brenda Creasey	(England) Betty Bartlett (England) Eileen M. Carley	(England) Anna Bowskill (England) Sylvia Penn
Mixed doubles	(England) Peter Emptage (England) Betty Bartlett	(Canada) Henry Paynter (Canada) Siew Har Hong	(Denmark) Ole Krogh Mortensen (Denmark) Jette Nielsen
Mixed doubles	(England) Peter Emptage (England) Betty Bartlett	(Canada) Henry Paynter (Canada) Siew Har Hong	(England) Robert J. Bell (England) Eileen M. Carley
70+
Men's singles	(South Africa) Johan Croukamp	(Denmark) Per Dabelsteen	(India) Hubert Miranda
Men's singles	(South Africa) Johan Croukamp	(Denmark) Per Dabelsteen	(England) Jim Garrett
Women's singles	(Japan) Yuriko Okemoto	(Japan) Yasuko Kataito	(Germany) Elvira Richter
Women's singles	(Japan) Yuriko Okemoto	(Japan) Yasuko Kataito	(Japan) Sumiko Kaneko
Men's doubles	(South Africa) Johan Croukamp (Finland) Carl-Johan Nybergh	(Denmark) Knud Danielsen (Denmark) Torben Hansen	(England) Michael John Cox (England) Jim Garrett
Men's doubles	(South Africa) Johan Croukamp (Finland) Carl-Johan Nybergh	(Denmark) Knud Danielsen (Denmark) Torben Hansen	(Germany) Peter Honnen (Germany) Claus-Peter Lienig
Women's doubles	(Japan) Haruko Asakoshi (Japan) Yasuko Kataito	(Denmark) Jette Nielsen (Denmark) Irene Sterlie	(Germany) Renate Knötzsch (Germany) Monika Regineri
Women's doubles	(Japan) Haruko Asakoshi (Japan) Yasuko Kataito	(Denmark) Jette Nielsen (Denmark) Irene Sterlie	(Japan) Sumiko Kaneko (Japan) Yuriko Okemoto
Mixed doubles	(Germany) Hans-Joachim Pothmann (Germany) Monika Regineri	(Japan) Hirohisa Toshijima (Japan) Yuriko Okemoto	(Denmark) Harry Skydsgaard (Denmark) Thea Gyldenøhr
Mixed doubles	(Germany) Hans-Joachim Pothmann (Germany) Monika Regineri	(Japan) Hirohisa Toshijima (Japan) Yuriko Okemoto	(England) Ian Brothers (England) Jan Hewett
75+
Men's singles	(Thailand) Seri Chintanaseri	(Poland) Paweł Gasz	(Germany) Matthias Kiefer
Men's singles	(Thailand) Seri Chintanaseri	(Poland) Paweł Gasz	(Japan) Akira Hirota
Women's singles	(Germany) Renate Gabriel	(Germany) Renate Knötzsch	(Finland) Wiola Renholm
Women's singles	(Germany) Renate Gabriel	(Germany) Renate Knötzsch	(England) Mary Jenner
Men's doubles	(Germany) Gerd Pflug (Germany) Dietmar Unser	(Poland) Paweł Gasz (Poland) Leopold Tukendorf	(Japan) Akira Hirota (Japan) Shinjiro Matsuda
Men's doubles	(Germany) Gerd Pflug (Germany) Dietmar Unser	(Poland) Paweł Gasz (Poland) Leopold Tukendorf	(Germany) Heiner Hanrath (Germany) Michael Oversberg
Women's doubles	(England) Beryl Goodall (England) Mary Jenner	(Germany) Renate Hoppe (Germany) Christel Klaar	(Sweden) Lisbeth Bengtsson (Finland) Wiola Renholm
Mixed doubles	(Germany) Hans Schumacher (Germany) Renate Gabriel	(Poland) Paweł Gasz (England) Beryl Goodall	(Germany) Wolfram Schatz (Germany) Renate Knötzsch
Mixed doubles	(Germany) Hans Schumacher (Germany) Renate Gabriel	(Poland) Paweł Gasz (England) Beryl Goodall	(Germany) Peter Gerth (Germany) Christel Klaar
