= Ole Nørskov Sørensen =

Danish handball player (born 1952)

Ole Nørskov
Personal information
- Full name: Ole Nørskov Sørensen
- Nationality: Danish
- Born: 13 January 1952 (age 74) Aarhus, Denmark
- Height: 190 cm (75 in)

Sport
- Sport: Handball
- Position: Goalkeeper
- Current club: Retired

Senior clubs
- Years: Team
- 1971-?: AGF
- –: SAGA
- ?-1983: AGF
National team
Years	Team	Apps
–	Denmark	66

Ole Nørskov Sørensen (born 13 January 1952) is a Danish former handball player and coach who competed in the 1980 Summer Olympics.

In 1980 he finished ninth with the Danish team in the Olympic tournament. He played all six matches as goalkeeper.

At club level he played at AGF for 10 years over two periods, interrupted by a two year stayed at the Copenhagen club SAGA.

After his playing days he has had several coaching positions including AGF and the Faroe Islands national team.

== The Hummel Controversy ==
Before 1980 Handball players could decide for themselves, which shoes they wanted to use, but this changed when the Danish national team signed a sponsorship agreement with Hummel forcing the players to use their shoes. As Ole Nørskov did not believe the shoes were good enough, he refused to do so and was subsequiently removed from the national team. Afterwards, he never played a match for the Danish national team.

== Private ==
He has worked as a teacher at a primary school in Mårslet, near Aarhus. He is also an avid musician.
