= Jesper Thomsen =

Danish badminton player (born 1974)

Jesper Thomsen (born 21 October 1974) is a Danish badminton player.

== Career ==
In 2001, Jesper Thomsen won the Slovak Internationals and the Scottish Open. In 2004, he won at the Czech Internationals and the Austrian Internationals. In the same year, he won two medals at the Badminton World Federation Senior European Championships.

== Victories ==
Season	Event	Discipline	Ranking	Name
1992	German Juniors	Mixed	1st	Jesper Thomsen / Jeanette Thomsen
2001	Slovak International	Mixed	1st	Jesper Thomsen / Julie Houmann
2001	Slovak International	Men's Doubles	1st	Tommy Sørensen / Jesper Thomsen
2001	Scottish Open	Men's Doubles	1st	Tommy Sørensen / Jesper Thomsen
2003	Dutch International	Men's Doubles	2nd	Jesper Thomsen / Tommy Sørensen
2004	Czech International	Mixed	1st	Jesper Thomsen / Britta Andersen
2004	Austrian International	Mixed	1st	Jesper Thomsen / Britta Andersen
2004	Seniors European Championships 40+	Men's Singles	2nd	Jesper Thomsen
2004	Seniors European Championships 40+	Men's Doubles	2nd	Morten Christensen / Jesper Thomsen
