= List of Badminton World Cup medalists =

Badminton championships

The tables below are Badminton World Cup medalists of all events (Men's and Women's Singles, Men's and Women's Doubles and Mixed).

== Men's singles ==
| Year | Host City | Gold | Silver | Bronze |
|---|---|---|---|---|
| 1979 | Tokyo | (Indonesia) Liem Swie King | (Indonesia) Iie Sumirat | (England) Kevin Jolly |
| 1979 | Tokyo | (Indonesia) Liem Swie King | (Indonesia) Iie Sumirat | (Denmark) Flemming Delfs |
| 1980 | Kyoto | (Indonesia) Liem Swie King | (Japan) Masao Tsuchida | (India) Prakash Padukone |
| 1980 | Kyoto | (Indonesia) Liem Swie King | (Japan) Masao Tsuchida | (Denmark) Flemming Delfs |
| 1981 | Kuala Lumpur | (India) Prakash Padukone | (China) Han Jian | (China) Chen Changjie |
| 1982 | Kuala Lumpur | (Indonesia) Liem Swie King | (Malaysia) Misbun Sidek | (China) Han Jian |
| 1983 | Kuala Lumpur | (China) Han Jian | (Indonesia) Hastomo Arbi | (Indonesia) Icuk Sugiarto |
| 1983 | Kuala Lumpur | (China) Han Jian | (Indonesia) Hastomo Arbi | (Malaysia) Misbun Sidek |
| 1984 | Jakarta | (China) Han Jian | (China) Yang Yang | (Indonesia) Liem Swie King |
| 1984 | Jakarta | (China) Han Jian | (China) Yang Yang | (Indonesia) Hastomo Arbi |
| 1985 | Jakarta | (Indonesia) Icuk Sugiarto | (Denmark) Morten Frost | (Malaysia) Misbun Sidek |
| 1985 | Jakarta | (Indonesia) Icuk Sugiarto | (Denmark) Morten Frost | (China) Yang Yang |
| 1986 | Bandung & Jakarta | (Indonesia) Icuk Sugiarto | (Denmark) Morten Frost | (China) Zhao Jianhua |
| 1986 | Bandung & Jakarta | (Indonesia) Icuk Sugiarto | (Denmark) Morten Frost | (China) Yang Yang |
| 1987 | Kuala Lumpur | (China) Zhao Jianhua | (China) Yang Yang | (Indonesia) Alan Budikusuma |
| 1987 | Kuala Lumpur | (China) Zhao Jianhua | (China) Yang Yang | (China) Xiong Guobao |
| 1988 | Bangkok | (China) Yang Yang | (China) Zhao Jianhua | (Indonesia) Eddy Kurniawan |
| 1988 | Bangkok | (China) Yang Yang | (China) Zhao Jianhua | (China) Xiong Guobao |
| 1989 | Guangzhou | (China) Yang Yang | (Malaysia) Foo Kok Keong | (China) Zhao Jianhua |
| 1989 | Guangzhou | (China) Yang Yang | (Malaysia) Foo Kok Keong | (Denmark) Poul-Erik Høyer Larsen |
| 1990 | Bandung & Jakarta | (China) Wu Wenkai | (China) Zhao Jianhua | (China) Yang Yang |
| 1990 | Bandung & Jakarta | (China) Wu Wenkai | (China) Zhao Jianhua | (Indonesia) Ardy Wiranata |
| 1991 | Portuguese Macau | (Indonesia) Ardy Wiranata | (China) Zhao Jianhua | (China) Wu Wenkai |
| 1991 | Portuguese Macau | (Indonesia) Ardy Wiranata | (China) Zhao Jianhua | (China) Liu Jun |
| 1992 | Guangzhou | (Indonesia) Joko Suprianto | (Indonesia) Hermawan Susanto | (Malaysia) Foo Kok Keong |
| 1992 | Guangzhou | (Indonesia) Joko Suprianto | (Indonesia) Hermawan Susanto | (China) Zhao Jianhua |
| 1993 | New Delhi | (Indonesia) Alan Budikusuma | (Indonesia) Joko Suprianto | (Indonesia) Hermawan Susanto |
| 1993 | New Delhi | (Indonesia) Alan Budikusuma | (Indonesia) Joko Suprianto | (Malaysia) Rashid Sidek |
| 1994 | Ho Chi Minh City | (Indonesia) Hariyanto Arbi | (Denmark) Thomas Stuer-Lauridsen | (Indonesia) Ardy Wiranata |
| 1994 | Ho Chi Minh City | (Indonesia) Hariyanto Arbi | (Denmark) Thomas Stuer-Lauridsen | (Indonesia) Joko Suprianto |
| 1995 | Jakarta | (Indonesia) Joko Suprianto | (Indonesia) Alan Budikusuma | (China) Chen Gang |
| 1995 | Jakarta | (Indonesia) Joko Suprianto | (Indonesia) Alan Budikusuma | (Indonesia) Ardy Wiranata |
| 1996 | Jakarta | (China) Dong Jiong | (Indonesia) Jeffer Rosobin | (South Korea) Park Sung-woo |
| 1996 | Jakarta | (China) Dong Jiong | (Indonesia) Jeffer Rosobin | (England) Darren Hall |
| 1997 | Yogyakarta | (China) Sun Jun | (Indonesia) Joko Suprianto | (Malaysia) Ong Ewe Hock |
| 1997 | Yogyakarta | (China) Sun Jun | (Indonesia) Joko Suprianto | (Indonesia) Indra Wijaya |
| 2005 | Yiyang | (China) Lin Dan | (Thailand) Boonsak Ponsana | (China) Chen Hong |
| 2005 | Yiyang | (China) Lin Dan | (Thailand) Boonsak Ponsana | (South Korea) Shon Seung-mo |
| 2006 | Yiyang | (China) Lin Dan | (China) Chen Yu | (Indonesia) Taufik Hidayat |
| 2006 | Yiyang | (China) Lin Dan | (China) Chen Yu | (China) Chen Jin |

== Women's singles ==
| Year | Host City | Gold | Silver | Bronze |
|---|---|---|---|---|
| 1979 | Tokyo | (Denmark) Lene Køppen | (Japan) Hiroe Yuki | (Indonesia) Verawaty Wiharjo |
| 1979 | Tokyo | (Denmark) Lene Køppen | (Japan) Hiroe Yuki | (Indonesia) Ivana Lie |
| 1980 | Kyoto | (Denmark) Lene Køppen | (Japan) Hiroe Yuki | (Japan) Yoshiko Yonekura |
| 1980 | Kyoto | (Denmark) Lene Køppen | (Japan) Hiroe Yuki | (Denmark) Kirsten Larsen |
| 1981 | Kuala Lumpur | (China) Chen Ruizhen | (China) Li Lingwei | (Indonesia) Ivana Lie |
| 1982 | Kuala Lumpur | (Denmark) Lene Køppen | (Indonesia) Verawaty Fadjrin | (China) Zheng Yuli |
| 1983 | Kuala Lumpur | (China) Han Aiping | (China) Zhang Ailing | (China) Li Lingwei |
| 1983 | Kuala Lumpur | (China) Han Aiping | (China) Zhang Ailing | (Indonesia) Ivana Lie |
| 1984 | Jakarta | (China) Li Lingwei | (China) Han Aiping | (China) Qian Ping |
| 1984 | Jakarta | (China) Li Lingwei | (China) Han Aiping | (Indonesia) Ivana Lie |
| 1985 | Jakarta | (China) Li Lingwei | (Indonesia) Ivana Lie | (China) Wu Jianqiu |
| 1985 | Jakarta | (China) Li Lingwei | (Indonesia) Ivana Lie | (Denmark) Kirsten Larsen |
| 1986 | Bandung & Jakarta | (China) Li Lingwei | (China) Han Aiping | (Denmark) Kirsten Larsen |
| 1986 | Bandung & Jakarta | (China) Li Lingwei | (China) Han Aiping | (South Korea) Hwang Hye-young |
| 1987 | Kuala Lumpur | (China) Li Lingwei | (China) Han Aiping | (Indonesia) Elizabeth Latief |
| 1987 | Kuala Lumpur | (China) Li Lingwei | (China) Han Aiping | (China) Zheng Yuli |
| 1988 | Bangkok | (China) Han Aiping | (China) Li Lingwei | (South Korea) Hwang Hye-young |
| 1988 | Bangkok | (China) Han Aiping | (China) Li Lingwei | (China) Huang Hua |
| 1989 | Guangzhou | (Indonesia) Susi Susanti | (China) Han Aiping | (China) Tang Jiuhong |
| 1989 | Guangzhou | (Indonesia) Susi Susanti | (China) Han Aiping | (China) Huang Hua |
| 1990 | Bandung & Jakarta | (Indonesia) Sarwendah Kusumawardhani | (Indonesia) Susi Susanti | (China) Tang Jiuhong |
| 1990 | Bandung & Jakarta | (Indonesia) Sarwendah Kusumawardhani | (Indonesia) Susi Susanti | (China) Huang Hua |
| 1991 | Portuguese Macau | (China) Huang Hua | (Indonesia) Sarwendah Kusumawardhani | (Indonesia) Susi Susanti |
| 1991 | Portuguese Macau | (China) Huang Hua | (Indonesia) Sarwendah Kusumawardhani | (South Korea) Lee Heung-soon |
| 1992 | Guangzhou | (China) Tang Jiuhong | (China) Huang Hua | (South Korea) Lee Heung-soon |
| 1992 | Guangzhou | (China) Tang Jiuhong | (China) Huang Hua | (South Korea) Bang Soo-hyun |
| 1993 | New Delhi | (Indonesia) Susi Susanti | (Sweden) Lim Xiaoqing | (Thailand) Somharuthai Jaroensiri |
| 1993 | New Delhi | (Indonesia) Susi Susanti | (Sweden) Lim Xiaoqing | (China) Ye Zhaoying |
| 1994 | Ho Chi Minh City | (Indonesia) Susi Susanti | (South Korea) Bang Soo-hyun | (Denmark) Camilla Martin |
| 1994 | Ho Chi Minh City | (Indonesia) Susi Susanti | (South Korea) Bang Soo-hyun | (China) Ye Zhaoying |
| 1995 | Jakarta | (China) Ye Zhaoying | (Indonesia) Susi Susanti | (Indonesia) Mia Audina |
| 1995 | Jakarta | (China) Ye Zhaoying | (Indonesia) Susi Susanti | (Sweden) Lim Xiaoqing |
| 1996 | Jakarta | (Indonesia) Susi Susanti | (China) Wang Chen | (China) Ye Zhaoying |
| 1996 | Jakarta | (Indonesia) Susi Susanti | (China) Wang Chen | (Indonesia) Mia Audina |
| 1997 | Yogyakarta | (Indonesia) Susi Susanti | (China) Ye Zhaoying | (China) Gong Zhichao |
| 1997 | Yogyakarta | (Indonesia) Susi Susanti | (China) Ye Zhaoying | (Indonesia) Mia Audina |
| 2005 | Yiyang | (China) Xie Xingfang | (China) Zhang Ning | (China) Lu Lan |
| 2005 | Yiyang | (China) Xie Xingfang | (China) Zhang Ning | (Netherlands) Yao Jie |
| 2006 | Yiyang | (China) Wang Yihan | (China) Xie Xingfang | (China) Zhang Ning |
| 2006 | Yiyang | (China) Wang Yihan | (China) Xie Xingfang | (China) Jiang Yanjiao |

== Men's doubles ==
| Year | Host City | Gold | Silver | Bronze |
|---|---|---|---|---|
| 1979 | Tokyo | (Indonesia) Ade Chandra (Indonesia) Christian Hadinata | (Japan) Yoshitaka Iino (Japan) Masao Tsuchida | (England) David Eddy (England) Derek Talbot |
| 1979 | Tokyo | (Indonesia) Ade Chandra (Indonesia) Christian Hadinata | (Japan) Yoshitaka Iino (Japan) Masao Tsuchida | (Denmark) Flemming Delfs (Denmark) Steen Skovgaard |
| 1980 | Kyoto | (Indonesia) Ade Chandra (Indonesia) Christian Hadinata | (Denmark) Flemming Delfs (Denmark) Steen Skovgaard | (Japan) Nobutake Ikeda (Japan) Mikio Ozaki |
| 1980 | Kyoto | (Indonesia) Ade Chandra (Indonesia) Christian Hadinata | (Denmark) Flemming Delfs (Denmark) Steen Skovgaard | (Japan) Yoshitaka Iino (Japan) Masao Tsuchida |
| 1983 | Kuala Lumpur | (South Korea) Kim Moon-soo (South Korea) Park Joo-bong | (Indonesia) Bobby Ertanto (Indonesia) Christian Hadinata | (Malaysia) Jalani Sidek (Malaysia) Razif Sidek |
| 1983 | Kuala Lumpur | (South Korea) Kim Moon-soo (South Korea) Park Joo-bong | (Indonesia) Bobby Ertanto (Indonesia) Christian Hadinata | (Denmark) Morten Frost (Denmark) Jens Peter Nierhoff |
| 1984 | Jakarta | (Indonesia) Hariamanto Kartono (Indonesia) Liem Swie King | (China) Li Yongbo (China) Tian Bingyi | (Indonesia) Christian Hadinata (Indonesia) Hadibowo Susanto |
| 1984 | Jakarta | (Indonesia) Hariamanto Kartono (Indonesia) Liem Swie King | (China) Li Yongbo (China) Tian Bingyi | (Malaysia) Jalani Sidek (Malaysia) Razif Sidek |
| 1985 | Jakarta | (Indonesia) Hariamanto Kartono (Indonesia) Liem Swie King | (China) Li Yongbo (China) Tian Bingyi | (Malaysia) Jalani Sidek (Malaysia) Razif Sidek |
| 1985 | Jakarta | (Indonesia) Hariamanto Kartono (Indonesia) Liem Swie King | (China) Li Yongbo (China) Tian Bingyi | (Indonesia) Christian Hadinata (Indonesia) Hadibowo Susanto |
| 1986 | Bandung & Jakarta | (Indonesia) Bobby Ertanto (Indonesia) Liem Swie King | (Indonesia) Rudy Heryanto (Indonesia) Hadibowo Susanto | (South Korea) Kim Moon-soo (South Korea) Park Joo-bong |
| 1986 | Bandung & Jakarta | (Indonesia) Bobby Ertanto (Indonesia) Liem Swie King | (Indonesia) Rudy Heryanto (Indonesia) Hadibowo Susanto | (China) Zhang Qiang (China) Zhou Jincan |
| 1987 | Kuala Lumpur | (South Korea) Kim Moon-soo (South Korea) Park Joo-bong | (China) Li Yongbo (China) Tian Bingyi | (Indonesia) Eddy Hartono (Indonesia) Liem Swie King |
| 1987 | Kuala Lumpur | (South Korea) Kim Moon-soo (South Korea) Park Joo-bong | (China) Li Yongbo (China) Tian Bingyi | (Malaysia) Jalani Sidek (Malaysia) Razif Sidek |
| 1988 | Bangkok | (China) Li Yongbo (China) Tian Bingyi | (Malaysia) Jalani Sidek (Malaysia) Razif Sidek | (Indonesia) Rudy Gunawan (Indonesia) Eddy Hartono |
| 1988 | Bangkok | (China) Li Yongbo (China) Tian Bingyi | (Malaysia) Jalani Sidek (Malaysia) Razif Sidek | (Denmark) Jens Peter Nierhoff (Denmark) Michael Kjeldsen |
| 1989 | Guangzhou | (South Korea) Kim Moon-soo (South Korea) Park Joo-bong | (China) Li Yongbo (China) Tian Bingyi | (Japan) Shuji Matsuno (Japan) Shinji Matsuura |
| 1989 | Guangzhou | (South Korea) Kim Moon-soo (South Korea) Park Joo-bong | (China) Li Yongbo (China) Tian Bingyi | (Indonesia) Rudy Gunawan (Indonesia) Eddy Hartono |
| 1990 | Bandung & Jakarta | (Malaysia) Jalani Sidek (Malaysia) Razif Sidek | (Indonesia) Rudy Gunawan (Indonesia) Eddy Hartono | (China) Li Yongbo (China) Tian Bingyi |
| 1990 | Bandung & Jakarta | (Malaysia) Jalani Sidek (Malaysia) Razif Sidek | (Indonesia) Rudy Gunawan (Indonesia) Eddy Hartono | (Malaysia) Cheah Soon Kit (Malaysia) Soo Beng Kiang |
| 1991 | Portuguese Macau | (Malaysia) Jalani Sidek (Malaysia) Razif Sidek | (South Korea) Kim Moon-soo (South Korea) Park Joo-bong | (China) Chen Hongyong (China) Chen Kang |
| 1991 | Portuguese Macau | (Malaysia) Jalani Sidek (Malaysia) Razif Sidek | (South Korea) Kim Moon-soo (South Korea) Park Joo-bong | (China) Li Yongbo (China) Tian Bingyi |
| 1992 | Guangzhou | (Malaysia) Cheah Soon Kit (Malaysia) Soo Beng Kiang | (Indonesia) Rexy Mainaky (Indonesia) Ricky Subagja | (Malaysia) Yap Yee Guan (Malaysia) Yap Yee Hup |
| 1992 | Guangzhou | (Malaysia) Cheah Soon Kit (Malaysia) Soo Beng Kiang | (Indonesia) Rexy Mainaky (Indonesia) Ricky Subagja | (China) Chen Hongyong (China) Chen Kang |
| 1993 | New Delhi | (Indonesia) Rexy Mainaky (Indonesia) Ricky Subagja | (China) Chen Hongyong (China) Chen Kang | (Malaysia) Cheah Soon Kit (Malaysia) Soo Beng Kiang |
| 1993 | New Delhi | (Indonesia) Rexy Mainaky (Indonesia) Ricky Subagja | (China) Chen Hongyong (China) Chen Kang | (Sweden) Peter Axelsson (Sweden) Pär-Gunnar Jönsson |
| 1994 | Ho Chi Minh City | (Malaysia) Cheah Soon Kit (Malaysia) Soo Beng Kiang | (Indonesia) Rudy Gunawan (Indonesia) Bambang Suprianto | (Malaysia) Tan Kim Her (Malaysia) Yap Kim Hock |
| 1994 | Ho Chi Minh City | (Malaysia) Cheah Soon Kit (Malaysia) Soo Beng Kiang | (Indonesia) Rudy Gunawan (Indonesia) Bambang Suprianto | (Denmark) Thomas Lund (Denmark) Michael Søgaard |
| 1995 | Jakarta | (Indonesia) Rexy Mainaky (Indonesia) Ricky Subagja | (Thailand) Pramote Teerawiwatana (Thailand) Sakrapee Thongsari | (Malaysia) Cheah Soon Kit (Malaysia) Yap Kim Hock |
| 1995 | Jakarta | (Indonesia) Rexy Mainaky (Indonesia) Ricky Subagja | (Thailand) Pramote Teerawiwatana (Thailand) Sakrapee Thongsari | (Indonesia) Antonius Ariantho (Indonesia) Denny Kantono |
| 1996 | Jakarta | (Indonesia) Antonius Ariantho (Indonesia) Denny Kantono | (Indonesia) Sigit Budiarto (Indonesia) Rexy Mainaky | (Malaysia) Cheah Soon Kit (Malaysia) Yap Kim Hock |
| 1996 | Jakarta | (Indonesia) Antonius Ariantho (Indonesia) Denny Kantono | (Indonesia) Sigit Budiarto (Indonesia) Rexy Mainaky | (Russia) Andrey Antropov (Russia) Nikolai Zuyev |
| 1997 | Yogyakarta | (Indonesia) Rexy Mainaky (Indonesia) Ricky Subagja | (South Korea) Lee Dong-soo (South Korea) Yoo Yong-sung | (Malaysia) Choong Tan Fook (Malaysia) Lee Wan Wah |
| 1997 | Yogyakarta | (Indonesia) Rexy Mainaky (Indonesia) Ricky Subagja | (South Korea) Lee Dong-soo (South Korea) Yoo Yong-sung | (Indonesia) Sigit Budiarto (Indonesia) Candra Wijaya |
| 2005 | Yiyang | (China) Cai Yun (China) Fu Haifeng | (Indonesia) Sigit Budiarto (Indonesia) Candra Wijaya | (Denmark) Jens Eriksen (Denmark) Martin Lundgaard Hansen |
| 2005 | Yiyang | (China) Cai Yun (China) Fu Haifeng | (Indonesia) Sigit Budiarto (Indonesia) Candra Wijaya | (United States) Howard Bach (United States) Tony Gunawan |
| 2006 | Yiyang | (Indonesia) Markis Kido (Indonesia) Hendra Setiawan | (Malaysia) Robert Lin Woon Fui (Malaysia) Mohd Fairuzizuan Mohd Tazari | (China) Guo Zhendong (China) Xie Zhongbo |
| 2006 | Yiyang | (Indonesia) Markis Kido (Indonesia) Hendra Setiawan | (Malaysia) Robert Lin Woon Fui (Malaysia) Mohd Fairuzizuan Mohd Tazari | (China) Cai Yun (China) Fu Haifeng |

== Women's doubles ==
| Year | Host City | Gold | Silver | Bronze |
|---|---|---|---|---|
| 1979 | Tokyo | (Japan) Emiko Ueno (Japan) Yoshiko Yonekura | (Indonesia) Imelda Wiguna (Indonesia) Verawaty Wiharjo | (Japan) Sonoe Ōtsuka (Japan) Kazuko Sekine |
| 1979 | Tokyo | (Japan) Emiko Ueno (Japan) Yoshiko Yonekura | (Indonesia) Imelda Wiguna (Indonesia) Verawaty Wiharjo | (Japan) Mikiko Takada (Japan) Atsuko Tokuda |
| 1980 | Kyoto | (Japan) Atsuko Tokuda (Japan) Yoshiko Yonekura | (Indonesia) Imelda Wiguna (Indonesia) Verawaty Wiharjo | (England) Nora Perry (England) Jane Webster |
| 1980 | Kyoto | (Japan) Atsuko Tokuda (Japan) Yoshiko Yonekura | (Indonesia) Imelda Wiguna (Indonesia) Verawaty Wiharjo | (Japan) Saori Kondo (Japan) Mikiko Takada |
| 1983 | Kuala Lumpur | (China) Han Aiping (China) Li Lingwei | (China) Wu Jianqiu (China) Xu Rong | (South Korea) Kim Yun-ja (South Korea) Yoo Sang-hee |
| 1983 | Kuala Lumpur | (China) Han Aiping (China) Li Lingwei | (China) Wu Jianqiu (China) Xu Rong | (England) Gillian Clark (England) Gillian Gilks |
| 1984 | Jakarta | (China) Lin Ying (China) Wu Dixi | (China) Wu Jianqiu (China) Xu Rong | (England) Gillian Gilks (China) Li Lingwei |
| 1984 | Jakarta | (China) Lin Ying (China) Wu Dixi | (China) Wu Jianqiu (China) Xu Rong | (England) Gillian Clark (England) Nora Perry |
| 1985 | Jakarta | (China) Lin Ying (China) Wu Dixi | (South Korea) Kim Yun-ja (South Korea) Yoo Sang-hee | (Indonesia) Rosiana Tendean (Indonesia) Imelda Wiguna |
| 1985 | Jakarta | (China) Lin Ying (China) Wu Dixi | (South Korea) Kim Yun-ja (South Korea) Yoo Sang-hee | (China) Han Aiping (China) Li Lingwei |
| 1986 | Bandung & Jakarta | (China) Han Aiping (China) Li Lingwei | (Indonesia) Rosiana Tendean (Indonesia) Imelda Wiguna | (South Korea) Chung Myung-hee (South Korea) Hwang Hye-young |
| 1986 | Bandung & Jakarta | (China) Han Aiping (China) Li Lingwei | (Indonesia) Rosiana Tendean (Indonesia) Imelda Wiguna | (Indonesia) Verawaty Fadjrin (Indonesia) Ivana Lie |
| 1987 | Kuala Lumpur | (China) Han Aiping (China) Li Lingwei | (China) Guan Weizhen (China) Lin Ying | (Indonesia) Verawaty Fadjrin (Indonesia) Rosiana Tendean |
| 1987 | Kuala Lumpur | (China) Han Aiping (China) Li Lingwei | (China) Guan Weizhen (China) Lin Ying | (South Korea) Chung Myung-hee (South Korea) Hwang Hye-young |
| 1988 | Bangkok | (China) Guan Weizhen (China) Lin Ying | (South Korea) Chung So-young (South Korea) Kim Yun-ja | (Denmark) Dorte Kjær (Denmark) Nettie Nielsen |
| 1988 | Bangkok | (China) Guan Weizhen (China) Lin Ying | (South Korea) Chung So-young (South Korea) Kim Yun-ja | (Indonesia) Verawaty Fadjrin (Indonesia) Yanti Kusmiati |
| 1989 | Guangzhou | (China) Guan Weizhen (China) Lin Ying | (South Korea) Chung So-young (South Korea) Hwang Hye-young | (China) Sun Xiaoqing (China) Zhou Lei |
| 1989 | Guangzhou | (China) Guan Weizhen (China) Lin Ying | (South Korea) Chung So-young (South Korea) Hwang Hye-young | (Indonesia) Verawaty Fadjrin (Indonesia) Yanti Kusmiati |
| 1990 | Bandung & Jakarta | (China) Lai Caiqin (China) Yao Fen | (Indonesia) Erma Sulistianingsih (Indonesia) Rosiana Tendean | (South Korea) Chung So-young (South Korea) Hwang Hye-young |
| 1990 | Bandung & Jakarta | (China) Lai Caiqin (China) Yao Fen | (Indonesia) Erma Sulistianingsih (Indonesia) Rosiana Tendean | (Netherlands) Eline Coene (Netherlands) Erica van Dijck |
| 1991 | Portuguese Macau | (South Korea) Chung So-young (South Korea) Hwang Hye-young | (Indonesia) Erma Sulistianingsih (Indonesia) Rosiana Tendean | (England) Gillian Clark (Denmark) Nettie Nielsen |
| 1991 | Portuguese Macau | (South Korea) Chung So-young (South Korea) Hwang Hye-young | (Indonesia) Erma Sulistianingsih (Indonesia) Rosiana Tendean | (China) Lai Caiqin (China) Yao Fen |
| 1992 | Guangzhou | (China) Lin Yanfen (China) Yao Fen | (England) Gillian Gowers (England) Sara Sankey | (England) Gillian Clark (Sweden) Christine Magnusson |
| 1992 | Guangzhou | (China) Lin Yanfen (China) Yao Fen | (England) Gillian Gowers (England) Sara Sankey | (Indonesia) Erma Sulistianingsih (Indonesia) Rosiana Tendean |
| 1993 | New Delhi | (Sweden) Lim Xiaoqing (Sweden) Christine Magnusson | (South Korea) Chung So-young (South Korea) Gil Young-ah | (Indonesia) Finarsih (Indonesia) Lili Tampi |
| 1993 | New Delhi | (Sweden) Lim Xiaoqing (Sweden) Christine Magnusson | (South Korea) Chung So-young (South Korea) Gil Young-ah | (China) Lin Yanfen (China) Yao Fen |
| 1994 | Ho Chi Minh City | (Indonesia) Finarsih (Indonesia) Lili Tampi | (South Korea) Chung So-young (South Korea) Gil Young-ah | (Denmark) Lotte Olsen (Denmark) Lisbet Stuer-Lauridsen |
| 1994 | Ho Chi Minh City | (Indonesia) Finarsih (Indonesia) Lili Tampi | (South Korea) Chung So-young (South Korea) Gil Young-ah | (China) Chen Ying (China) Wu Yuhong |
| 1995 | Jakarta | (Indonesia) Eliza Nathanael (Indonesia) Zelin Resiana | (Indonesia) Finarsih (Indonesia) Lili Tampi | (Denmark) Helene Kirkegaard (Denmark) Rikke Olsen |
| 1995 | Jakarta | (Indonesia) Eliza Nathanael (Indonesia) Zelin Resiana | (Indonesia) Finarsih (Indonesia) Lili Tampi | (England) Julie Bradbury (England) Joanne Wright |
| 1996 | Jakarta | (China) Ge Fei (China) Gu Jun | (China) Qin Yiyuan (China) Tang Yongshu | (South Korea) Kim Mee-hyang (South Korea) Kim Shin-young |
| 1996 | Jakarta | (China) Ge Fei (China) Gu Jun | (China) Qin Yiyuan (China) Tang Yongshu | (Indonesia) Eliza Nathanael (Indonesia) Zelin Resiana |
| 1997 | Yogyakarta | (China) Ge Fei (China) Gu Jun | (China) Qin Yiyuan (China) Tang Yongshu | (Indonesia) Eliza Nathanael (Indonesia) Zelin Resiana |
| 1997 | Yogyakarta | (China) Ge Fei (China) Gu Jun | (China) Qin Yiyuan (China) Tang Yongshu | (Indonesia) Finarsih (Indonesia) Indarti Issolina |
| 2005 | Yiyang | (China) Yang Wei (China) Zhang Jiewen | (China) Wei Yili (China) Zhang Yawen | (China) Zhang Dan (China) Zhao Tingting |
| 2005 | Yiyang | (China) Yang Wei (China) Zhang Jiewen | (China) Wei Yili (China) Zhang Yawen | (South Korea) Ha Jung-eun (South Korea) Kim Min-jung |
| 2006 | Yiyang | (China) Gao Ling (China) Huang Sui | (China) Yang Wei (China) Zhang Jiewen | (Chinese Taipei) Cheng Wen-hsing (Chinese Taipei) Chien Yu-chin |
| 2006 | Yiyang | (China) Gao Ling (China) Huang Sui | (China) Yang Wei (China) Zhang Jiewen | (Malaysia) Chin Eei Hui (Malaysia) Wong Pei Tty |

== Mixed doubles ==
| Year | Host City | Gold | Silver | Bronze |
|---|---|---|---|---|
| 1983 | Kuala Lumpur | (England) Martin Dew (England) Gillian Gilks | (Indonesia) Christian Hadinata (Indonesia) Ivana Lie | (Denmark) Jesper Helledie (England) Sally Podger |
| 1983 | Kuala Lumpur | (England) Martin Dew (England) Gillian Gilks | (Indonesia) Christian Hadinata (Indonesia) Ivana Lie | (Sweden) Thomas Kihlström (England) Karen Chapman |
| 1984 | Jakarta | (Sweden) Thomas Kihlström (England) Nora Perry | (Indonesia) Christian Hadinata (Indonesia) Ivana Lie | (Indonesia) Hariamanto Kartono (Indonesia) Imelda Wiguna |
| 1984 | Jakarta | (Sweden) Thomas Kihlström (England) Nora Perry | (Indonesia) Christian Hadinata (Indonesia) Ivana Lie | (England) Martin Dew (England) Gillian Gilks |
| 1985 | Jakarta | (Indonesia) Christian Hadinata (Indonesia) Ivana Lie | (Denmark) Steen Fladberg (England) Nora Perry | (Denmark) Jesper Helledie (China) Lin Ying |
| 1985 | Jakarta | (Indonesia) Christian Hadinata (Indonesia) Ivana Lie | (Denmark) Steen Fladberg (England) Nora Perry | (England) Martin Dew (England) Gillian Gilks |
| 1986 | Bandung & Jakarta | (Indonesia) Eddy Hartono (Indonesia) Verawaty Fadjrin | (Denmark) Steen Fladberg (England) Gillian Clark | (Indonesia) Hafid Yusuf (Indonesia) Yanti Kusmiati |
| 1986 | Bandung & Jakarta | (Indonesia) Eddy Hartono (Indonesia) Verawaty Fadjrin | (Denmark) Steen Fladberg (England) Gillian Clark | (Sweden) Thomas Kihlström (Sweden) Christine Magnusson |
| 1987 | Kuala Lumpur | (China) Wang Pengren (China) Shi Fangjing | (Denmark) Steen Fladberg (England) Gillian Clark | (Denmark) Jan Paulsen (England) Gillian Gowers |
| 1987 | Kuala Lumpur | (China) Wang Pengren (China) Shi Fangjing | (Denmark) Steen Fladberg (England) Gillian Clark | (South Korea) Lee Deuk-choon (South Korea) Chung Myung-hee |
| 1988 | Bangkok | (China) Wang Pengren (China) Shi Fangjing | (South Korea) Park Joo-bong (South Korea) Chung Myung-hee | (England) Andy Goode (England) Gillian Gowers |
| 1988 | Bangkok | (China) Wang Pengren (China) Shi Fangjing | (South Korea) Park Joo-bong (South Korea) Chung Myung-hee | (Sweden) Jan-Eric Antonsson (Sweden) Maria Bengtsson |
| 1989 | Guangzhou | (South Korea) Park Joo-bong (South Korea) Chung Myung-hee | (South Korea) Kim Moon-soo (South Korea) Chung So-young | (Sweden) Jan-Eric Antonsson (Sweden) Maria Bengtsson |
| 1989 | Guangzhou | (South Korea) Park Joo-bong (South Korea) Chung Myung-hee | (South Korea) Kim Moon-soo (South Korea) Chung So-young | (China) Jiang Guoliang (China) Nong Qunhua |
| 1990 | Bandung & Jakarta | (Indonesia) Rudy Gunawan (Indonesia) Rosiana Tendean | (Denmark) Jan Paulsen (England) Gillian Gowers | (Denmark) Henrik Svarrer (England) Gillian Clark |
| 1990 | Bandung & Jakarta | (Indonesia) Rudy Gunawan (Indonesia) Rosiana Tendean | (Denmark) Jan Paulsen (England) Gillian Gowers | (Indonesia) Aryono Miranat (Indonesia) Erma Sulistianingsih |
| 1991 | Portuguese Macau | (Indonesia) Rudy Gunawan (Indonesia) Rosiana Tendean | (Denmark) Thomas Lund (Denmark) Pernille Dupont | (South Korea) Kim Hak-kyun (South Korea) Hwang Hye-young |
| 1991 | Portuguese Macau | (Indonesia) Rudy Gunawan (Indonesia) Rosiana Tendean | (Denmark) Thomas Lund (Denmark) Pernille Dupont | (Sweden) Pär-Gunnar Jönsson (Sweden) Maria Bengtsson |
| 1992 | Guangzhou | (Indonesia) Rudy Gunawan (Indonesia) Rosiana Tendean | (Denmark) Jan Paulsen (England) Gillian Gowers | (China) Chen Xingdong (China) Sun Man |
| 1992 | Guangzhou | (Indonesia) Rudy Gunawan (Indonesia) Rosiana Tendean | (Denmark) Jan Paulsen (England) Gillian Gowers | (Sweden) Pär-Gunnar Jönsson (Sweden) Maria Bengtsson |
| 1993 | New Delhi | (Sweden) Peter Axelsson (England) Gillian Gowers | (Indonesia) Aryono Miranat (Indonesia) Eliza Nathanael | (England) Nick Ponting (England) Gillian Clark |
| 1993 | New Delhi | (Sweden) Peter Axelsson (England) Gillian Gowers | (Indonesia) Aryono Miranat (Indonesia) Eliza Nathanael | (Sweden) Pär-Gunnar Jönsson (Sweden) Maria Bengtsson |
| 1994 | Ho Chi Minh City | (Denmark) Thomas Lund (Sweden) Catrine Bengtsson | (China) Chen Xingdong (China) Gu Jun | (Sweden) Jan-Eric Antonsson (Sweden) Astrid Crabo |
| 1994 | Ho Chi Minh City | (Denmark) Thomas Lund (Sweden) Catrine Bengtsson | (China) Chen Xingdong (China) Gu Jun | (Indonesia) Aryono Miranat (Indonesia) Rosalina Riseu |
| 1995 | Jakarta | (Indonesia) Tri Kusharjanto (Indonesia) Minarti Timur | (South Korea) Kim Dong-moon (South Korea) Kim Shin-young | (China) Jiang Xin (China) Zhang Jin |
| 1995 | Jakarta | (Indonesia) Tri Kusharjanto (Indonesia) Minarti Timur | (South Korea) Kim Dong-moon (South Korea) Kim Shin-young | (Indonesia) Flandy Limpele (Indonesia) Rosalina Riseu |
| 1996 | Jakarta | (Indonesia) Sandiarto (Indonesia) Minarti Timur | (Indonesia) Flandy Limpele (Indonesia) Rosalina Riseu | (Denmark) Michael Søgaard (Denmark) Rikke Olsen |
| 1996 | Jakarta | (Indonesia) Sandiarto (Indonesia) Minarti Timur | (Indonesia) Flandy Limpele (Indonesia) Rosalina Riseu | (China) Chen Xingdong (China) Peng Xinyong |
| 1997 | Yogyakarta | (China) Liu Yong (China) Ge Fei | (Indonesia) Tri Kusharjanto (Indonesia) Minarti Timur | (Indonesia) Flandy Limpele (Indonesia) Rosalina Riseu |
| 1997 | Yogyakarta | (China) Liu Yong (China) Ge Fei | (Indonesia) Tri Kusharjanto (Indonesia) Minarti Timur | (Indonesia) Imam Tohari (Indonesia) Emma Ermawati |
| 2005 | Yiyang | (China) Xie Zhongbo (China) Zhang Yawen | (Indonesia) Nova Widianto (Indonesia) Liliyana Natsir | (Thailand) Sudket Prapakamol (Thailand) Saralee Thungthongkam |
| 2005 | Yiyang | (China) Xie Zhongbo (China) Zhang Yawen | (Indonesia) Nova Widianto (Indonesia) Liliyana Natsir | (Denmark) Jens Eriksen (Denmark) Mette Schjoldager |
| 2006 | Yiyang | (Indonesia) Nova Widianto (Indonesia) Liliyana Natsir | (China) Xie Zhongbo (China) Zhang Yawen | (China) Zhang Jun (China) Gao Ling |
| 2006 | Yiyang | (Indonesia) Nova Widianto (Indonesia) Liliyana Natsir | (China) Xie Zhongbo (China) Zhang Yawen | (China) Zheng Bo (China) Zhao Tingting |

== See also ==
- List of BWF World Championships medalists
