= 1980 All England Open Badminton Championships =

1980 All England Championships
Tournament details
- Dates: 19 March 1980– 23 March 1980
- Edition: 70th
- Venue: Wembley Arena
- Location: London

The 1980 All England Championships was a badminton tournament held at Wembley Arena, London, England, from 19–23 March 1980. The event was sponsored by John Player.

== Final results ==
Category	Winners	Runners-up	Score
Men's singles	(India) Prakash Padukone	(Indonesia) Liem Swie King	15–3, 15–10
Women's singles	(Denmark) Lene Køppen	(Indonesia) Verawaty Wiharjo	11–2, 11–6
Men's doubles	(Indonesia) Tjun Tjun & Johan Wahjudi	(England) Ray Stevens & Mike Tredgett	10–15, 15–9, 15–10
Women's doubles	(England) Gillian Gilks & Nora Perry	(Japan) Atsuko Tokuda & Yoshiko Yonekura	11–15, 15–7, 15–6
Mixed doubles	(England) Mike Tredgett & Nora Perry	(Indonesia) Christian Hadinata & Imelda Wiguna	18–13, 15–10

== Men's singles ==
=== Seeds ===
1-2 (Denmark) Morten Frost Hansen
1-2 (Indonesia) Liem Swie King

=== Section 1 ===
Round of 32
(India) Prakash Padukone	15	15
(Malaysia) Suffian Abu Bakar	7	12
(Indonesia) Hadiyanto	15	15
(Japan) Yoshitaka Iino	2	9
(Denmark) Svend Pri	15	17	15
(Japan) Kinji Zeniya	6	18	12
(England) Paul Whetnall	15	18
(Netherlands) Rob Ridder	9	17
(Denmark) Morten Frost Hansen	17	18
(Indonesia) Hastomo Arbi	14	15
(Taiwan) Huang Chien Tong	6	15	17
(Malaysia) Saw Swee Leong	15	8	15
(Indonesia) Dhany Sartika	11	15	15
(Sweden) Sture Johnsson	15	12	11
(Japan) Hiroyuki Hasegawa	13	15	15
(Denmark) Kenneth Larsen	15	2	9

Round of 16
(India) Padukone	15	15
(Indonesia) Hadiyanto	0	10
(Denmark) Pri	15	14	15
(England) Whetnall	7	15	10
(Denmark) Frost Hansen	15	15
(Taiwan) Chien Tong	5	4
(Indonesia) Sartika	13	15	18
(Japan) Hasegawa	15	3	15

Quarter-finals
(India) Padukone	15	15
(Denmark) Pri	4	4
(Denmark) Frost Hansen	15	15
(Indonesia) Sartika	3	6

Semi-finals
(India) Padukone	15	15
(Denmark) Frost Hansen	8	10

=== Section 2 ===
Round of 32
(Indonesia) Liem Swie King	15	15
(England) David Hunt	2	2
(Denmark) Gert Helsholt	17	15
(Malaysia) Ho Khim Soon	14	11
(Sweden) Thomas Kihlström	15	15
(Denmark) Torben Nielsen	8	9
(Japan) Mikio Ozaki	15	15
(India) Sanat Misra	2	2
(Denmark) Flemming Delfs	15	15
(England) Steve Baddeley	5	11
(Malaysia) Misbun Sidek	15	15
(England) Michael Wilks	5	12
(Indonesia) Lius Pongoh	15	15
(England) Andy Goode	9	7
(Japan) Masao Tsuchida	15	15
(Denmark) Jens-Peter Nierhoff	10	7

Round of 16
(Indonesia) Swie King	15	15
(Denmark) Helsholt	9	4
(Sweden) Kihlström	15	18
(Japan) Ozaki	8	16
(Denmark) Delfs	13	15	15
(Malaysia) Sidek	15	4	4
(Indonesia) Pongoh	15	15
(Japan) Tsuchida	9	13

Quarter-finals
(Indonesia) Swie King	15	15
(Sweden) Kihlström	9	7
(Denmark) Delfs	15	15
(Indonesia) Pongoh	8	4

Semi-finals
(Indonesia) Swie King	15	15
(Denmark) Delfs	5	8

== Women's singles ==
=== Seeds ===
1-2 (Denmark) Lene Køppen
5-8 (England) Karen Bridge
(Indonesia) Verawaty Wiharjo
(Indonesia) Ivana Lie
(England) Gillian Gilks (knocked out round of 64)
(Japan) Saori Kondo
(Japan) Yoshiko Yonekura
(Japan) Hiroe Yuki

=== Section 1 ===
Round of 32
(Denmark) Lene Køppen	11	11
(West Germany) Marie-Luise Schulta-Jansen	2	0
(Guernsey) Sally Leadbeater
(Indonesia) Ivana Lie	11	11
(England) Kathleen Redhead	3	1
(Canada) Wendy Carter	12	12
(Netherlands) Marjan Ridder	10	11
(Denmark) Kirsten Larsen	11	11
(England) N Bewley	2	1
(India) Ami Ghia
(Japan) Mikiko Takada
(Japan) Saori Kondo	11	11
(England) Diane Simpson	0	1
(Australia) Julie McDonald	11	11
(Republic of Ireland) Diane Underwood	7	7

Round of 16
(Denmark) Køppen	11	11
(Guernsey) Leadbeater	1	4
(Indonesia) Ivana	9	11	11
(Canada) Carter	12	6	6
(Denmark) Larsen	11	11
(India) Ghia	7	0
(Japan) Kondo	11	11
(Australia) McDonald	7	6

Quarter-finals
(Denmark) Køppen	11	11
(Indonesia) Ivana	1	1
(Denmark) Larsen	11	11
(Japan) Kondo	5	9

Semi-finals
(Denmark) Køppen	11	11
(Denmark) Larsen	0	0

=== Section 2 ===
Round of 32
(Indonesia) Verawaty Wiharjo	11	11
(Canada) Sandra Skillings	3	0
(Netherlands) Hanke de Kort	11	11
(West Germany) Ingrid Morsch	1	5
(Japan) Hiroe Yuki	11	11
(Canada) Claire Backhouse	1	6
(England) Jane Webster	11	11
(Denmark) Lonny Bostofte	7	7
(Japan) Yoshiko Yonekura	11	11
(Indonesia) Tan Soo Gwan	2	0
(Denmark) Agnethe Juul	11	11
(Chinese Taipei) Lin Shiew-Ying	7	7
(England) Karen Bridge	12	11
(Denmark) Pia Nielsen	10	3
(Japan) Hitomi Ishida	11	11
(Netherlands) Joke van Beusekom	7	7

Round of 16
(Indonesia) Verawaty	11	11
(Netherlands) de Kort	3	5
(Japan) Yuki	11	11
(England) Webster	5	1
(Japan) Yonekura	11	11
(Denmark) Juul	1	3
(England) Bridge	11	11
(Japan) Ishida	7	7

Quarter-finals
(Indonesia) Verawaty	11	11
(Japan) Yuki	6	6
(Japan) Yonekura	6	11	11
(England) Bridge	11	0	2

Semi-finals
(Indonesia) Verawaty	11	11
(Japan) Yonekura	4	9
