= 1984 Uber Cup group stage =

Badminton team Tournament in Kuala Lumpur

The 1984 Uber Cup group stage was held at Stadium Negara in Kuala Lumpur, Malaysia, from 7 to 12 May 1984.

The group stage was first stage of the tournament where only the two highest-placing teams in each of the two groups advanced to the knockout stage.

== Draw ==
The original draw for the tournament was conducted on 4 April 1984. The 8 teams will be drawn into two groups each containing four teams.

=== Group composition ===
Group
Group A	Group B
Canada; England; South Korea; Malaysia (Host)	China; Denmark; Indonesia; Japan

== Group A ==
Pos	Team	Pld	W	L	GF	GA	GD	PF	PA	PD	Pts	Qualification
1	England	3	3	0	26	8	+18	372	249	+123	3	Advance to semi-finals
2	South Korea	3	2	1	25	8	+17	380	217	+163	2	Advance to semi-finals
3	Canada	3	1	2	9	23	−14	234	328	−94	1	
4	Malaysia	3	0	3	6	27	−21	193	385	−192	0	

Source: The Straits Times

=== England vs Canada ===
England
4
Stadium Negara
7 May 1984, 18:30 UTC+8

Canada
1

			1	2	3
1	(England) (Canada)	Helen Troke; Denyse Julien	11; 3	11; 4
2	(England) (Canada)	Karen Beckman; Sandra Skillings	1; 11	11; 8	11; 8
3	(England) (Canada)	Sally Podger; Claire Backhouse	11; 5	11; 5
4	(England) (Canada)	Gillian Clark / Gillian Gowers; Linda Cloutier / Denyse Julien	2; 5			retired
5	(England) (Canada)	Nora Perry / Jane Webster; Johanne Falardeau / Claire Backhouse	15; 5	15; 8

=== South Korea vs Malaysia ===
South Korea
5
Stadium Negara
8 May 1984, 18:30 UTC+8

Malaysia
0

			1	2	3
1	(South Korea) (Malaysia)	Yoo Sang-hee; Kok Chan Fong	11; 1	11; 2
2	(South Korea) (Malaysia)	Kim Bok-sun; Juliet Poon	11; 1	12; 10
3	(South Korea) (Malaysia)	Kim Yoon-sook; Tan Mei Chuan	11; 4	11; 3
4	(South Korea) (Malaysia)	Kim Yun-ja / Yoo Sang-hee; Juliet Poon / Tan Sui Hoon	15; 0	15; 0
5	(South Korea) (Malaysia)	Chung Myung-hee / Hwang Sun-ai; Khor Lay See / Katherine Teh	15; 5	15; 4

=== England vs Malaysia ===
England
5
Stadium Negara
9 May 1984, 18:30 UTC+8

Malaysia
0

			1	2	3
1	(England) (Malaysia)	Helen Troke; Leong Chai Lean	11; 7	11; 1
2	(England) (Malaysia)	Sally Podger; Juliet Poon	11; 1	3; 11	12; 9
3	(England) (Malaysia)	Jane Webster; Tan Mei Chuan	11; 0	11; 3
4	(England) (Malaysia)	Karen Beckman / Gillian Gilks; Juliet Poon / Tan Sui Hoon	15; 4	15; 7
5	(England) (Malaysia)	Nora Perry / Jane Webster; Leong Chai Lean / Katherine Teh	15; 9	15; 8

=== South Korea vs Canada ===
South Korea
5
Stadium Negara
10 May 1984, 18:30 UTC+8

Canada
0

			1	2	3
1	(South Korea) (Canada)	Kim Yun-ja; Sandra Skillings	11; 3	11; 4
2	(South Korea) (Canada)	Yoo Sang-hee; Sandra Stapleton	11; 3	11; 0
3	(South Korea) (Canada)	Kim Bok-sun; Gillian Calder	11; 1	11; 1
4	(South Korea) (Canada)	Kim Yun-ja / Yoo Sang-hee; Claire Backhouse / Johanne Falardeau	15; 12	15; 6
5	(South Korea) (Canada)	Chung Myung-hee / Hwang Sun-ai; Linda Cloutier / Denyse Julien	15; 6	15; 8

=== Canada vs Malaysia ===
Canada
3
Stadium Negara
11 May 1984, 18:30 UTC+8

Malaysia
2

			1	2	3
1	(Canada) (Malaysia)	Denyse Julien; Katherine Teh	8; 11	11; 6	11; 8
2	(Canada) (Malaysia)	Sandra Skillings; Leong Chai Lean	7; 11	11; 7	11; 12
3	(Canada) (Malaysia)	Claire Backhouse; Juliet Poon	3; 11	6; 11
4	(Canada) (Malaysia)	Karen Beckman / Gillian Gilks; Khaw Mooi Eng / Tan Sui Hoon	15; 11	15; 11
5	(Canada) (Malaysia)	Claire Backhouse / Johanne Falardeau; Leong Chai Lean / Katherine Teh	15; 1	15; 3

=== England vs South Korea ===
England
3
Stadium Negara
12 May 1984, 18:30 UTC+8

South Korea
2

			1	2	3
1	(England) (South Korea)	Helen Troke; Kim Yun-ja	11; 4	11; 7
2	(England) (South Korea)	Jane Webster; Kim Yoon-sook	6; 11	11; 2	2; 11
3	(England) (South Korea)	Sally Podger; Yoo Sang-hee	11; 3	11; 8
4	(England) (South Korea)	Karen Beckman / Gillian Gilks; Kim Yun-ja / Yoo Sang-hee	10; 15	15; 12	15; 18
5	(England) (South Korea)	Nora Perry / Jane Webster; Chung Myung-hee / Hwang Sun-ai	10; 15	15; 13	15; 8

== Group B ==
Pos	Team	Pld	W	L	GF	GA	GD	PF	PA	PD	Pts	Qualification
1	China	3	3	0	30	3	+27	412	203	+209	3	Advance to semi-finals
2	Denmark	3	2	1	15	20	−5	316	358	−42	2	Advance to semi-finals
3	Japan	3	1	2	13	22	−9	296	377	−81	1	
4	Indonesia	3	0	3	12	25	−13	324	410	−86	0	

Source: The Straits Times

=== China vs Indonesia ===
China
5
Stadium Negara
7 May 1984, 18:30 UTC+8

Indonesia
0

			1	2	3
1	(China) (Indonesia)	Li Lingwei; Ivana Lie	12; 10	11; 0
2	(China) (Indonesia)	Han Aiping; Ratih Kumaladewi	11; 7	11; 7
3	(China) (Indonesia)	Zhang Ailing; Elizabeth Latief	9; 12	11; 4	11; 4
4	(China) (Indonesia)	Lin Ying / Wu Dixi; Ruth Damayanti / Maria Fransisca	15; 3	15; 8
5	(China) (Indonesia)	Wu Jianqiu / Xu Rong; Imelda Kurniawan / Rosiana Tendean	8; 15	15; 4	15; 11

=== Japan vs Denmark ===
Japan
2
Stadium Negara
8 May 1984, 18:30 UTC+8

Denmark
3

			1	2	3
1	(Japan) (Denmark)	Fumiko Tōkairin; Kirsten Larsen	1; 11	11; 12
2	(Japan) (Denmark)	Sumiko Kitada; Rikke von Sørensen	1; 11	1; 11
3	(Japan) (Denmark)	Saori Kōmoto; Dorte Kjær	12; 9	8; 11	7; 11
4	(Japan) (Denmark)	Atsuko Tokuda / Yoshiko Yonekura; Liselotte Gøttsche / Grete Mogensen	15; 5	15; 9
5	(Japan) (Denmark)	Saori Kōmoto / Mikiko Takada; Birgitte Hindse / Dorte Kjær	7; 15	15; 9	6; 15

=== Japan vs Indonesia ===
Japan
3
Stadium Negara
9 May 1984, 18:30 UTC+8

Indonesia
2

			1	2	3
1	(Japan) (Indonesia)	Fumiko Tōkairin; Ivana Lie	9; 12	3; 11
2	(Japan) (Indonesia)	Sumiko Kitada; Ratih Kumaladewi	11; 1	11; 4
3	(Japan) (Indonesia)	Saori Kōmoto; Elizabeth Latief	11; 6	1; 11	12; 10
4	(Japan) (Indonesia)	Atsuko Tokuda / Yoshiko Yonekura; Ruth Damayanti / Ivana Lie	15; 5	15; 6
5	(Japan) (Indonesia)	Saori Kōmoto / Mikiko Takada; Imelda Kurniawan / Rosiana Tendean	15; 11	7; 15	8; 15

=== China vs Denmark ===
China
5
Stadium Negara
10 May 1984, 18:30 UTC+8

Denmark
0

			1	2	3
1	(China) (Denmark)	Li Lingwei; Kirsten Larsen	12; 10	11; 2
2	(China) (Denmark)	Han Aiping; Rikke von Sørensen	11; 4	11; 0
3	(China) (Denmark)	Qian Ping; Dorte Kjær	11; 6	11; 2
4	(China) (Denmark)	Wu Jianqiu / Xu Rong; Liselotte Gøttsche / Grete Mogensen	15; 8	15; 6
5	(China) (Denmark)	Lin Ying / Wu Dixi; Dorte Kjær / Kirsten Larsen	15; 0	15; 1

=== China vs Japan ===
China
5
Stadium Negara
11 May 1984, 18:30 UTC+8

Japan
0

			1	2	3
1	(China) (Japan)	Li Lingwei; Fumiko Tōkairin	11; 1	12; 9
2	(China) (Japan)	Han Aiping; Sumiko Kitada	11; 7	11; 8
3	(China) (Japan)	Zhang Ailing; Saori Kōmoto	11; 2	11; 3
4	(China) (Japan)	Lin Ying / Wu Dixi; Atsuko Tokuda / Yoshiko Yonekura	15; 8	15; 7
5	(China) (Japan)	Wu Jianqiu / Xu Rong; Saori Kōmoto / Mikiko Takada	15; 6	11; 15	18; 13

=== Indonesia vs Denmark ===
Indonesia
2
Stadium Negara
12 May 1984, 18:30 UTC+8

Denmark
3

			1	2	3
1	(Indonesia) (Denmark)	Ivana Lie; Kirsten Larsen	2; 11	8; 11
2	(Indonesia) (Denmark)	Mary Harlim; Dorte Kjær	8; 11	1; 11
3	(Indonesia) (Denmark)	Elizabeth Latief; Rikke von Sørensen	5; 11	12; 10	10; 12
4	(Indonesia) (Denmark)	Imelda Kurniawan / Rosiana Tendean; Liselotte Gøttsche / Grete Mogensen	12; 15	15; 10	15; 10
5	(Indonesia) (Denmark)	Ruth Damayanti / Maria Fransisca; Dorte Kjær / Kirsten Larsen	17; 15	12; 15	15; 6
