= 1984 Uber Cup knockout stage =

Badminton championships

The knockout stage for the 1984 Uber Cup in Kuala Lumpur, Malaysia began on 14 May 1984 with the semi-finals and ended on 17 May 1984 with the final.

== Qualified teams ==
The top two placed teams from each of the two groups qualified for this stage.

Group	Winners	Runners-up
A	England	South Korea
B	China	Denmark

== Bracket ==
Semi-finals
China	5
South Korea	0
Denmark	1
England	4

Final
China	5
England	0
Third place
South Korea	5
Denmark	0

== Semi-finals ==
=== Semi-final 1 ===
China
5
Stadium Negara
14 May 1984, 19:00 UTC+8

South Korea
0

			1	2	3
1	(China) (South Korea)	Li Lingwei; Kim Yun-ja	11; 3	11; 2
2	(China) (South Korea)	Han Aiping; Yoo Sang-hee	11; 3	11; 1
3	(China) (South Korea)	Qian Ping; Kim Yoon-sook	11; 1	11; 5
4	(China) (South Korea)	Lin Ying / Wu Dixi; Kim Yun-ja / Yoo Sang-hee	15; 5	15; 9
5	(China) (South Korea)	Wu Jianqiu / Xu Rong; Chung Myung-hee / Hwang Sun-ai	18; 13	15; 10

=== Semi-final 2 ===
England
3
Stadium Negara
15 May 1984, 19:00 UTC+8

Denmark
2

			1	2	3
1	(England) (Denmark)	Helen Troke; Kirsten Larsen	8; 11	11; 7	11; 4
2	(England) (Denmark)	Sally Podger; Rikke von Sørensen	3; 11	6; 11
3	(England) (Denmark)	Jane Webster; Dorte Kjær	7; 11	11; 5	4; 11
4	(England) (Denmark)	Karen Beckman / Gillian Gilks; Dorte Kjær / Kirsten Larsen	15; 3	15; 2
5	(England) (Denmark)	Nora Perry / Jane Webster; Liselotte Gøttsche / Grete Mogensen	15; 10	15; 2

== Third place ==
South Korea
5
Stadium Negara
16 May 1984, 19:00 UTC+8

Denmark
0

			1	2	3
1	(South Korea) (Denmark)	Kim Yun-ja; Kirsten Larsen	11; 3	7; 11	11; 2
2	(South Korea) (Denmark)	Yoo Sang-hee; Rikke von Sørensen	11; 5	11; 3
3	(South Korea) (Denmark)	Kim Yoon-sook; Dorte Kjær	11; 5	11; 6
4	(South Korea) (Denmark)	Hwang Sun-ai / Chung Myung-hee; Liselotte Gøttsche / Kirsten Larsen	15; 5	15; 5
5	(South Korea) (Denmark)	Kim Yun-ja / Yoo Sang-hee; Dorte Kjær / Grete Mogensen	15; 12	15; 1

== Final ==
China
5
Stadium Negara
17 May 1984, 19:00 UTC+8

England
0

			1	2	3
1	(China) (England)	Li Lingwei; Helen Troke	11; 2	11; 3
2	(China) (England)	Lin Ying / Wu Dixi; Gillian Gilks / Karen Beckman	15; 3	15; 12
3	(China) (England)	Han Aiping; Sally Podger	7; 11	11; 3	11; 6
4	(China) (England)	Xu Rong / Wu Jianqiu; Nora Perry / Jane Webster	15; 1	13; 18	15; 8
5	(China) (England)	Zhang Ailing; Gillian Gowers	11; 7	11; 1
