= 1984 Thomas Cup group stage =

Badminton team Tournament in Kuala Lumpur

The 1984 Thomas Cup group stage was held at Stadium Negara in Kuala Lumpur, Malaysia, from 7 to 12 May 1984.

The group stage was first stage of the tournament where only the two highest-placing teams in each of the two groups advanced to the knockout stage.

== Draw ==
The original draw for the tournament was conducted on 4 April 1984. The 8 teams will be drawn into two groups each containing four teams.

=== Group composition ===
Group
Group A	Group B
England; Indonesia; Japan; Malaysia (Host)	China; Denmark; South Korea; Sweden

== Group A ==
Pos	Team	Pld	W	L	GF	GA	GD	PF	PA	PD	Pts	Qualification
1	Indonesia	3	3	0	26	7	+19	471	292	+179	3	Advance to semi-finals
2	England	3	2	1	19	16	+3	450	435	+15	2	Advance to semi-finals
3	Malaysia	3	1	2	17	19	−2	455	441	+14	1	
4	Japan	3	0	3	6	26	−20	245	453	−208	0	

Source: The Straits Times

=== Malaysia vs Japan ===
Malaysia
5
Stadium Negara
7 May 1984, 18:30 UTC+8

Japan
0

			1	2	3
1	(Malaysia) (Japan)	Misbun Sidek; Hiroyuki Hasegawa	8; 15	15; 6	15; 10
2	(Malaysia) (Japan)	Ong Beng Teong; Shinji Matsuura	6; 15	15; 6	15; 12
3	(Malaysia) (Japan)	Razif Sidek; Hiroshi Nishiyama	15; 5	15; 3
4	(Malaysia) (Japan)	Jalani Sidek / Razif Sidek; Shuji Matsuno / Shinji Matsuura	15; 3	15; 0
5	(Malaysia) (Japan)	Misbun Sidek / Soh Goon Chup; Tetsuaki Inoue / Shōkichi Miyamori	15; 10	15; 10

=== Indonesia vs England ===
Indonesia
3
Stadium Negara
8 May 1984, 18:30 UTC+8

England
2

			1	2	3
1	(Indonesia) (England)	Liem Swie King; Steve Baddeley	15; 2	15; 7
2	(Indonesia) (England)	Hastomo Arbi; Nick Yates	15; 7	15; 8
3	(Indonesia) (England)	Icuk Sugiarto; Steve Butler	15; 12	14; 15	12; 15
4	(Indonesia) (England)	Rudy Heryanto / Hariamanto Kartono; Steve Baddeley / Martin Dew	15; 9	11; 15	9; 15
5	(Indonesia) (England)	Hadibowo / Christian Hadinata; Mike Tredgett / Dipak Tailor	15; 6	15; 9

=== England vs Japan ===
England
4
Stadium Negara
9 May 1984, 18:30 UTC+8

Japan
1

			1	2	3
1	(England) (Japan)	Steve Baddeley; Hiroyuki Hasegawa	15; 18	12; 15
2	(England) (Japan)	Nick Yates; Shinji Matsuura	15; 8	15; 2
3	(England) (Japan)	Steve Butler; Hiroshi Nishiyama	15; 3	15; 9
4	(England) (Japan)	Martin Dew / Mike Tredgett; Shuji Matsuno / Shinji Matsuura	15; 3	13; 18	15; 4
5	(England) (Japan)	Chris Dobson / Dipak Tailor; Tetsuaki Inoue / Shōkichi Miyamori	15; 9	15; 12

=== Indonesia vs Malaysia ===
Indonesia
5
Stadium Negara
10 May 1984, 18:30 UTC+8

Malaysia
0

			1	2	3
1	(Indonesia) (Malaysia)	Liem Swie King; Misbun Sidek	15; 11	15; 4
2	(Indonesia) (Malaysia)	Hastomo Arbi; Ong Beng Teong	15; 9	11; 15	15; 8
3	(Indonesia) (Malaysia)	Icuk Sugiarto; Razif Sidek	15; 4	15; 9
4	(Indonesia) (Malaysia)	Rudy Heryanto / Hariamanto Kartono; Jalani Sidek / Razif Sidek	12; 15	15; 9	15; 10
5	(Indonesia) (Malaysia)	Hadibowo / Christian Hadinata; Misbun Sidek / Soh Goon Chup	15; 13	18; 16

=== Indonesia vs Japan ===
Indonesia
4
Stadium Negara
11 May 1984, 18:30 UTC+8

Japan
1

			1	2	3
1	(Indonesia) (Japan)	Liem Swie King; Hiroyuki Hasegawa	15; 6	15; 8
2	(Indonesia) (Japan)	Hastomo Arbi; Shinji Matsuura	15; 3	15; 2
3	(Indonesia) (Japan)	Icuk Sugiarto; Hiroshi Nishiyama	15; 1	15; 3
4	(Indonesia) (Japan)	Rudy Heryanto / Hariamanto Kartono; Shuji Matsuno / Shinji Matsuura	12; 15			retired
5	(Indonesia) (Japan)	Hadibowo / Christian Hadinata; Tetsuaki Inoue / Shōkichi Miyamori	15; 7	15; 4

=== England vs Malaysia ===
England
3
Stadium Negara
12 May 1984, 18:30 UTC+8

Malaysia
2

			1	2	3
1	(England) (Malaysia)	Steve Baddeley; Misbun Sidek	15; 12	15; 11
2	(England) (Malaysia)	Nick Yates; Ong Beng Teong	15; 17	18; 17	10; 15
3	(England) (Malaysia)	Steve Butler; Razif Sidek	9; 15	15; 11	15; 12
4	(England) (Malaysia)	Steve Baddeley / Martin Dew; Jalani Sidek / Razif Sidek	9; 15	16; 18
5	(England) (Malaysia)	Andy Goode / Mike Tredgett; Misbun Sidek / Soh Goon Chup	18; 13	15; 12

== Group B ==
Pos	Team	Pld	W	L	GF	GA	GD	PF	PA	PD	Pts	Qualification
1	China	3	3	0	26	11	+15	494	367	+127	3	Advance to semi-finals
2	South Korea	3	2	1	21	16	+5	472	412	+60	2	Advance to semi-finals
3	Denmark	3	1	2	20	17	+3	452	412	+40	1	
4	Sweden	3	0	3	6	29	−23	284	511	−227	0	

Source: The Straits Times

=== Denmark vs Sweden ===
Denmark
4
Stadium Negara
7 May 1984, 18:30 UTC+8

Sweden
1

			1	2	3
1	(Denmark) (Sweden)	Morten Frost; Ulf Johansson	15; 2	15; 3
2	(Denmark) (Sweden)	Jens Peter Nierhoff; Göran Carlsson	15; 4	15; 6
3	(Denmark) (Sweden)	Steen Fladberg; Torbjörn Pettersson	16; 18	15; 7	15; 3
4	(Denmark) (Sweden)	Morten Frost / Jens Peter Nierhoff; Stefan Karlsson / Thomas Kihlström	8; 15	15; 10	11; 15
5	(Denmark) (Sweden)	Steen Fladberg / Jesper Helledie; Ulf Johansson / Lars Wengberg	15; 3	15; 11

=== China vs South Korea ===
China
4
Stadium Negara
8 May 1984, 18:30 UTC+8

South Korea
1

			1	2	3
1	(China) (South Korea)	Luan Jin; Park Joo-bong	15; 6	15; 10
2	(China) (South Korea)	Han Jian; Sung Han-kook	7; 15	15; 0	15; 6
3	(China) (South Korea)	Yang Yang; Choi Byung-hak	15; 11	15; 8
4	(China) (South Korea)	He Shangquan / Jiang Guoliang; Kim Moon-soo / Park Joo-bong	15; 10	16; 17	2; 15
5	(China) (South Korea)	Sun Zhian / Tian Bingyi; Lee Deuk-choon / Sung Han-kook	15; 12	13; 15	15; 12

=== China vs Denmark ===
China
3
Stadium Negara
9 May 1984, 18:30 UTC+8

Denmark
2

			1	2	3
1	(China) (Denmark)	Luan Jin; Morten Frost	3; 15	7; 15
2	(China) (Denmark)	Han Jian; Jens Peter Nierhoff	15; 5	15; 8
3	(China) (Denmark)	Yang Yang; Claus Andersen	15; 7	15; 3
4	(China) (Denmark)	He Shangquan / Jiang Guoliang; Steen Fladberg / Jesper Helledie	17; 14	9; 15	10; 15
5	(China) (Denmark)	Sun Zhian / Tian Bingyi; Morten Frost / Michael Kjeldsen	9; 15	15; 9	15; 6

=== South Korea vs Sweden ===
South Korea
5
Stadium Negara
10 May 1984, 18:30 UTC+8

Sweden
0

			1	2	3
1	(South Korea) (Sweden)	Park Joo-bong; Ulf Johansson	15; 5	15; 2
2	(South Korea) (Sweden)	Sung Han-kook; Göran Carlsson	11; 15	15; 1	15; 7
3	(South Korea) (Sweden)	Choi Byung-hak; Torbjörn Pettersson	17; 14	15; 6
4	(South Korea) (Sweden)	Kim Moon-soo / Park Joo-bong; Stefan Karlsson / Thomas Kihlström	15; 8	15; 7
5	(South Korea) (Sweden)	Lee Deuk-choon / Sung Han-kook; Göran Carlsson / Lars Wengberg	15; 3	17; 16

=== Denmark vs South Korea ===
Denmark
2
Stadium Negara
11 May 1984, 18:30 UTC+8

South Korea
3

			1	2	3
1	(Denmark) (South Korea)	Morten Frost; Park Joo-bong	15; 11	4; 15	15; 7
2	(Denmark) (South Korea)	Jens Peter Nierhoff; Sung Han-kook	15; 5	15; 11
3	(Denmark) (South Korea)	Steen Fladberg; Choi Byung-hak	18; 16	10; 15	11; 15
4	(Denmark) (South Korea)	Morten Frost / Jens Peter Nierhoff; Kim Moon-soo / Park Joo-bong	15; 12	10; 15	10; 15
5	(Denmark) (South Korea)	Steen Fladberg / Jesper Helledie; Lee Deuk-choon / Sung Han-kook	13; 18	4; 15

=== China vs Sweden ===
China
5
Stadium Negara
12 May 1984, 18:30 UTC+8

Sweden
0

			1	2	3
1	(China) (Sweden)	Luan Jin; Stefan Karlsson	15; 17	15; 2	15; 3
2	(China) (Sweden)	Yang Yang; Ulf Johansson	15; 11	15; 4
3	(China) (Sweden)	Chen Changjie; Torbjörn Pettersson	15; 5	15; 12
4	(China) (Sweden)	He Shangquan / Jiang Guoliang; Stefan Karlsson / Thomas Kihlström	11; 15	15; 9	15; 10
5	(China) (Sweden)	Sun Zhian / Tian Bingyi; Göran Carlsson / Lars Wengberg	15; 8	15; 7
