= Hadiyanto =

Indonesian badminton player

Personal information
- Full name: Hadiyanto Wirawan
- Born: 31 March 1955 (age 71) Pekalongan, Jawa Tengah, Indonesia

Sport
- Country: Indonesia
- Sport: Badminton
- Handedness: Right
Medal record
Men's badminton
Representing Indonesia
World Championships
Bronze medal – third place	1980 Jakarta	Men's singles
Thomas Cup
Gold medal – first place	1984 Kuala Lumpur	Men's team
Asian Games
Silver medal – second place	1982 New Delhi	Men's team

Hadiyanto Wirawan (born 31 March 1955) is an Indonesian former badminton player.

== About ==
A former national champion, Hadiyanto is best remembered for his win over top seed Prakash Padukone in 1980 World Championships in quarterfinals. Padukone was heavy favourite for the tournament but was denied by Hadiyanto in two straight games 15–11, 15–13. In the semifinals he lost to legendary Rudy Hartono and bagged the bronze medal. Hadiyanto played in the final tie of 1982 Asian Games where Indonesian team won the silver medal and was also a part of team that won the 1984 Thomas Cup, beating China in the final.

== Achievements ==
=== World Championships ===
Men's singles
Year	Venue	Opponent	Score	Result
1980	Istora Senayan, Jakarta, Indonesia	(Indonesia) Rudy Hartono	6–15, 8–15	Bronze

=== International tournaments ===
Men's singles
Year	Tournament	Opponent	Score	Result	Ref.
1979	Penang Open	(India) Prakash Padukone	7–15, 15–11, 15–2	(gold) Winner	
1979	Selangor Open	(Indonesia) Dhany Sartika	15–7, 15–9	(gold) Winner	
1979	Indian International	(India) Prakash Padukone	4–15, 12–15	(silver) Runner-up	
1981	Copenhagen Cup	(Indonesia) Lius Pongoh	10–15, 9–15	(silver) Runner-up	
1981	Carlton Open	(Indonesia) Kurniahu			
1982	Taiwan Masters	(Indonesia) Dhany Sartika	15–7, 15–5	(gold) Winner	

Men's doubles
Year	Tournament	Partner	Opponent	Score	Result	Ref.
1979	Indian International	(Indonesia) Kartono	(Malaysia) M. K. Ann (Malaysia) Soh Goon Chup	15–8, 15–10	(gold) Winner	
1979	India Open	(Indonesia) Dhany Sartika	(Indonesia) Rudy Heryanto (Indonesia) Kartono	1–15, 11–15	(silver) Runner-up	
