= 1983 All England Open Badminton Championships =

1983 All England Championships
Tournament details
- Dates: 23 March 1983– 27 March 1983
- Edition: 73rd
- Venue: Wembley Arena
- Location: London

The 1983 John Player All England Open Championships was the 73rd edition held in 1983, at Wembley Arena, London.

== Final results ==
Category	Winners	Runners-up	Score
Men's singles	(China) Luan Jin	(Denmark) Morten Frost	15:2, 12:15, 15:4
Women's singles	(China) Zhang Ailing	(China) Wu Jianqiu	11:5, 10:12, 12:9
Men's doubles	(Sweden) Stefan Karlsson & Thomas Kihlström	(England) Mike Tredgett & Martin Dew	15:10, 15:13
Women's doubles	(China) Xu Rong & Wu Jianqiu	(China) Lin Ying & Wu Dixi	15:9, 15:11
Mixed doubles	(Sweden) Thomas Kihlström & (England) Nora Perry	(Denmark) Steen Skovgaard & Anne Skovgaard	18:16, 11:15, 15:6

== Men's singles ==
=== Seeds ===
1. (Denmark) Morten Frost
2. (Indonesia) Liem Swie King - withdrew through injury
3. (Indonesia) Icuk Sugiarto
4. (China) Luan Jin
5. (Malaysia) Misbun Sidek
6. (China) Chen Changjie
7. (India) Prakash Padukone
8. (China) Li Yongbo

=== Section 1 ===
Round of 32
(China) Luan Jin	15	15
(England) Kevin Jolly	10	7
(Sweden) Gøran Carlsson	15	15
(Australia) Tariq Farooq	11	5
(Denmark) Jens Peter Nierhoff	15	7	15
(England) Darren Hall	8	15	10
(Malaysia) Misbun Sidek	18	15
(Australia) Darren Madonald	15	7
(India) Prakash Padukone	15	15
(Japan) Shokichi Miyamori	4	6
(Denmark) Michael Kjeldsen	15	15
(England) Gerry Asquith	7	9
(Denmark) Kenneth Larsen	15	15
(England) Dipak Tailor	5	10
(Thailand) Udom Luangpetcharaporn	15	15
(India) Vikram Singh	9	8

Round of 16
(China) Luan Jin	17	17
(Sweden) Carlsson	14	14
(Denmark) Nierhoff	15	5	15
(Malaysia) Sidek	9	15	10
(India) Padukone	15	15
(Denmark) Kjeldsen	3	5
(Denmark) Larsen	15	15
(Thailand) Luangpetcharaporn	3	8

Quarter-finals
(China) Luan Jin	15	15
(Denmark) Nierhoff	9	3
(India) Padukone	15	15
(Denmark) Larsen	6	8

Semi-finals
(China) Luan Jin	15	15
(India) Padukone	6	7

=== Section 2 ===
Round of 32
(Denmark) Morten Frost	15	15
(England) Steve Baddeley	5	5
(South Korea) Park Joo Bong	15	15
(England) Glen Milton	2	6
(Wales) Philip Sutton	15	15
(China) Li Yongbo	9	11
(Thailand) Sompol Kukasemkij	6	18	15
(Japan) Hiroyuki Hasegawa	15	16	4
(China) Tian Bingyi	15	15
(Indonesia) Icuk Sugiarto	8	11
(Hong Kong) Sze Yu	15	15
(Japan) Kinji Zeniya	6	8
(England) Nick Yates	15	15
(Denmark) Steen Fladberg	9	2
(China) Chen Changjie	15	15
(Denmark) Jesper Knudsen	2	5

Round of 16
(Denmark) Frost	15	15
(South Korea) Joo Bong	4	10
(Wales) Sutton	4	15	17
(Thailand) Kukasemkij	15	5	14
(China) Bingyi	15	15
(Hong Kong) Sze Yu	10	2
(England) Yates	18	15
(China) Changjie	17	10

Quarter-finals
(Denmark) Frost	15	15
(Wales) Sutton	4	3
(China) Bingyi	15	15
(England) Yates	12	2

Semi-finals
(Denmark) Frost	15	15
(China) Bingyi	9	13

== Women's singles ==
=== Seeds ===
1. (China) Zhang Ailing
2. (China) Li Lingwei
3. (China) Wu Jianqui
4. (Denmark) Lene Køppen
5. (China) Xu Rong
6. (China) Han Aiping
7. (China) Wu Dixi
8. (Denmark) Kirsten Larsen - eliminated in round of 64

=== Section 1 ===
Round of 32
(China) Zhang Ailing	11	11
(England) Sara Halsall	5	3
(England) Jane Webster	11	11	11
(Republic of Ireland) Diane Underwood	12	4	0
(China) Wu Dixi	11	11
(West Germany) Kirsten Schmieder	0	2
(Japan) Sumiko Kitada	11	11
(England) Fiona Elliott	3	0
(China) Xu Rong	11	11
(Scotland) Gillian Martin	1	4
(Canada) Johanne Falardeau	3	11	11
(Taiwan) Sherry Liu	11	1	3
(Denmark) Lene Køppen	11	11
(England) Debbie Hore	1	0
(England) Sally Podger	11	11
(England) Sue Louis	6	1

Round of 16
(China) Ailing	11	11
(England) Webster	7	4
(China) Wu Dixi	11	11
(Japan) Kitada	2	5
(China) Xu Rong	11	11
(Canada) Falardeau	3	6
(Denmark) Køppen	11	12
(England) Podger	6	11

Quarter-finals
(China) Ailing	11	11
(China) Wu Dixi	7	3
Xu Rong	11	11
Køppen	3	0

Semi-finals
(China) Ailing	12	11
(China) Xu Rong	10	4

=== Section 2 ===
Round of 32
(China) Wu Jianqiu	11	11
(England) Gillian Gowers	5	2
(Japan) Fumiko Tohkairin	11	11
(Netherlands) Marjan Ridder	2	7
(China) Han Aiping	11	11
(Scotland) Alison Fulton	2	2
(England) Helen Troke	w/o
(Denmark) Dorthe Lynge	scr
(China) Li Lingwei	w/o
(England) Gillian Clark	scr
(Denmark) Grete Morgensen	w/o
(India) Hufrish Nariman	scr
(England) Karen Beckman	11	11
(Scotland) Pamela Hamilton	7	0
(Canada) Claire Backhouse	6	11	11
(Japan) Shigemi Kawamura	11	2	3

Round of 16
(China) Jianqiu	11	11
(Japan) Tohkairin	0	6
(China) Aiping	11	11
(England) Troke	7	1
(China) Lingwei	11	11
(Denmark) Morgensen	1	2
(England) Beckman	11	11
(Canada) Backhouse	9	7

Quarter-finals
(China) Jianqiu	12	12
(China) Aiping	10	9
(China) Lingwei	11	11
(England) Beckman	2	8

Semi-finals
(China) Jianqiu	11	8	11
(China) Lingwei	8	11
