= 1984 Thomas Cup knockout stage =

Badminton championships

The knockout stage for the 1984 Thomas Cup in Kuala Lumpur, Malaysia began on 14 May 1984 with the semi-finals and ended on 18 May 1984 with the final.

== Qualified teams ==
The top two placed teams from each of the two groups qualified for this stage.

| Group | Winners | Runners-up |
|---|---|---|
| A | Indonesia | England |
| B | China | South Korea |

== Bracket ==
Semi-finals
Indonesia | 4
South Korea | 1
England | 1
China | 4

Final
Indonesia | 3
China | 2
Third place
England | 3
South Korea | 2

== Semi-finals ==
=== Semi-final 1 ===
Indonesia
4
Stadium Negara
14 May 1984, 19:00 UTC+8

South Korea
1

| | | | 1 | 2 | 3 |
|---|---|---|---|---|---|
| 1 | (Indonesia) (South Korea) | Liem Swie King; Park Joo-bong | 15; 4 | 18; 17 |
| 2 | (Indonesia) (South Korea) | Hastomo Arbi; Sung Han-kook | 15; 6 | 6; 15 | 15; 9 |
| 3 | (Indonesia) (South Korea) | Icuk Sugiarto; Choi Byung-hak | 15; 3 | 15; 6 |
| 4 | (Indonesia) (South Korea) | Rudy Heryanto / Hariamanto Kartono; Park Joo-bong / Kim Moon-soo | 14; 17 | 9; 15 |
| 5 | (Indonesia) (South Korea) | Hadibowo / Christian Hadinata; Lee Deuk-choon / Sung Han-kook | 15; 6 | 15; 5 |

=== Semi-final 2 ===
China
4
Stadium Negara
15 May 1984, 19:00 UTC+8

England
1

| | | | 1 | 2 | 3 |
|---|---|---|---|---|---|
| 1 | (China) (England) | Luan Jin; Steve Baddeley | 15; 9 | 15; 1 |
| 2 | (China) (England) | Han Jian; Andy Goode | 15; 3 | 15; 7 |
| 3 | (China) (England) | Yang Yang; Steve Butler | 15; 8 | 15; 9 |
| 4 | (China) (England) | He Shangquan / Jiang Guoliang; Martin Dew / Mike Tredgett | 15; 10 | 3; 15 | 9; 15 |
| 5 | (China) (England) | Sun Zhian / Tian Bingyi; Chris Dobson / Dipak Tailor | 15; 8 | 15; 9 |

== Third place ==
England
3
Stadium Negara
16 May 1984, 19:00 UTC+8

South Korea
2

| | | | 1 | 2 | 3 |
|---|---|---|---|---|---|
| 1 | (England) (South Korea) | Steve Baddeley; Park Joo-bong | 6; 15 | 15; 8 | 3; 15 |
| 2 | (England) (South Korea) | Steve Butler; Sung Han-kook | 16; 17 | 17; 14 | 15; 1 |
| 3 | (England) (South Korea) | Dipak Tailor; Choi Byung-hak | 11; 15 | 15; 11 | 15; 6 |
| 4 | (England) (South Korea) | Steve Baddeley / Martin Dew; Kim Moon-soo / Park Joo-bong | 10; 15 | 4; 15 |
| 5 | (England) (South Korea) | Andy Goode / Mike Tredgett; Lee Deuk-choon / Sung Han-kook | 17; 15 | 17; 14 |

== Final ==
China
2
Stadium Negara
18 May 1984, 19:00 UTC+8

Indonesia
3

| | | | 1 | 2 | 3 |
|---|---|---|---|---|---|
| 1 | (China) (Indonesia) | Luan Jin; Liem Swie King | 7; 15 | 15; 11 | 15; 10 |
| 2 | (China) (Indonesia) | Han Jian; Hastomo Arbi | 17; 14 | 6; 15 | 8; 15 |
| 3 | (China) (Indonesia) | Yang Yang; Icuk Sugiarto | 15; 9 | 15; 10 |
| 4 | (China) (Indonesia) | He Shangquan / Jiang Guoliang; Hadibowo / Christian Hadinata | 14; 18 | 10; 15 |
| 5 | (China) (Indonesia) | Sun Zhian / Tian Bingyi; Hariamanto Kartono / Liem Swie King | 14; 18 | 12; 15 |
