= 1980 IBF World Championships – Men's singles =

Badminton championships

Men's singles at the 1980 IBF World Championships
- Venue: Istora
- Location: Jakarta, Indonesia
- Dates: May 27, 1980 – June 1, 1980

Medalists
| gold medal | Rudy Hartono | Indonesia |
| silver medal | Liem Swie King | Indonesia |
| bronze medal | Hadiyanto | Indonesia |
| bronze medal | Lius Pongoh | Indonesia |

The 1980 IBF World Championships were held in Jakarta, Indonesia in 1980. Following the results of the men's singles.

== Main stage ==
=== Section 1 ===
First round
(India) Prakash Padukone
(Netherlands) Jacob van Selm
(Australia) Paul Kong
(Denmark) Steen Fladberg | 18 | 15
(Canada) Pat Tryon | 13 | 7
(Indonesia) Hadiyanto | 15 | 15
(Malaysia) Razif Sidek | 0 | 1
(Netherlands) Richard Pal | 15 | 3 | 2
(Chinese Taipei) Chung Tsung Lieh | 4 | 15 | 15
(Japan) Kinji Zeniya | 15 | 15
(Chinese Taipei) Bernd Wessels | 5 | 8
(England) Kevin Jolly | 15 | 15
(Sweden) Sture Johnsson | 6 | 7

Second round
(India) Prakash Padukone | 15 | 15
(Netherlands) Jacob van Selm | 3 | 3
(Australia) Paul Kong | 4 | 5
(Denmark) Steen Fladberg | 15 | 15
(Indonesia) Hadiyanto | 15 | 15
(Chinese Taipei) Chung Tsung Lieh | 3 | 0
(Japan) Kinji Zeniya | 15 | 2 | 15
(England) Kevin Jolly | 7 | 15 | 7

Third round
(India) Prakash Padukone | 15 | 15
(Denmark) Steen Fladberg | 11 | 5
(Indonesia) Hadiyanto | 15 | 8 | 15
(Japan) Kinji Zeniya | 7 | 15 | 3

Quarterfinals
(India) Prakash Padukone | 11 | 13
(Indonesia) Hadiyanto | 15 | 15

=== Section 2 ===
First round
3 | (Indonesia) Rudy Hartono
bye
(Malaysia) Jalani Sidek
bye
(United States) Chris Kinard | 15 | 17 | 15
(Chinese Taipei) Chen For Chuen | 17 | 16 | 2
(Socialist Federal Republic of Yugoslavia) Stane Koprivsek
(England) Ray Stevens | 15 | 15
(Canada) Paul Johnson | 10 | 6
(Sweden) Stefan Karlsson | 15 | 15
(Scotland) Dan Travers | 8 | 1
(Mexico) Roy Díaz González | 15 | 15
(India) Vikram Singh | 0 | 13
(Denmark) Flemming Delfs | 15 | 15
(Austria) Hiroyuki Hasegawa | 10 | 3

Second round
3 | (Indonesia) Rudy Hartono | 15 | 15
(Malaysia) Jalani Sidek | 9 | 2
(United States) Chris Kinard | 15 | 15
(Socialist Federal Republic of Yugoslavia) Stane Koprivsek | 8 | 1
(England) Ray Stevens | 18 | 15
(Sweden) Stefan Karlsson | 13 | 10
(Mexico) Roy Díaz González | 15 | 5 | 15
(Denmark) Flemming Delfs | 12 | 15 | 1

Third round
3 | (Indonesia) Rudy Hartono | 15 | 15
(United States) Chris Kinard | 7 | 3
(England) Ray Stevens | 15 | 15
(Mexico) Roy Díaz González | 6 | 0

Quarterfinals
3 | (Indonesia) Rudy Hartono | 15 | 15
(England) Ray Stevens | 1 | 3

=== Section 3 ===
First round
(Indonesia) Lius Pongoh | 15 | 15
(Australia) Peter Cooper | 6 | 1
(Scotland) Billy Gilliland | 15 | 15
(Mexico) Jorge Palazuelos | 11 | 2
(India) Syed Modi | 15 | 15
(Malaysia) Saw Swee Leong | 10 | 6
(Sweden) Bengt Fröman | 15 | 15
(Socialist Federal Republic of Yugoslavia) Gregor Berden | 11 | 7
(Denmark) Morten Frost
bye
(Japan) Toshihiro Tsuji
(Netherlands) Rob Ridder | 15 | 15
(Thailand) Liao Kun Fu | 11 | 3
(Canada) John Czich

Second round
(Indonesia) Lius Pongoh | 15 | 15
(Scotland) Billy Gilliland | 0 | 1
(India) Syed Modi | 15 | 15
(Sweden) Bengt Fröman | 1 | 7
(Denmark) Morten Frost | 15 | 15
(Japan) Toshihiro Tsuji | 3 | 1
(Netherlands) Rob Ridder | 15 | 15
(Canada) John Czich | 6 | 1

Third round
(Indonesia) Lius Pongoh | 15 | 15
(India) Syed Modi | 3 | 3
(Denmark) Morten Frost | 17 | 15
(Netherlands) Rob Ridder | 14 | 3

Quarterfinals
(Indonesia) Lius Pongoh | 15 | 15
(Denmark) Morten Frost | 11 | 6

=== Section 4 ===
First round
(Japan) Masao Tsuchida | 15 | 15
(Mexico) Ricardo Jaramillo | 8 | 9
(Australia) Mark Harry | 15 | 15
(Thailand) Liu Hon Jai | 4 | 10
(Sweden) Thomas Kihlström | 15 | 15
(Denmark) Svend Pri | 8 | 6
(India) Partho Ganguli | 15 | 8 | 15
(England) Steve Baddeley | 7 | 15 | 10
2 | (Indonesia) Liem Swie King
bye
(Malaysia) Misbun Sidek
bye
(New Zealand) Stephen Wilson
(Canada) James McKee

Second round
(Japan) Masao Tsuchida | 10 | 15 | 15
(Australia) Mark Harry | 15 | 9 | 8
(Sweden) Thomas Kihlström | 9 | 18 | 15
(India) Partho Ganguli | 15 | 14 | 7
2 | (Indonesia) Liem Swie King | 15 | 15 | 15
(Malaysia) Misbun Sidek | 17 | 3 | 4
(New Zealand) Stephen Wilson | 15 | 15
(Canada) James McKee | 2 | 9

Third round
(Japan) Masao Tsuchida | 15 | 15
(Sweden) Thomas Kihlström
2 | (Indonesia) Liem Swie King | 15 | 15
(New Zealand) Stephen Wilson | 1 | 2

Quarterfinals
(Japan) Masao Tsuchida | 1 | 2
2 | (Indonesia) Liem Swie King | 15 | 15

== Final stage ==
Quarterfinals
1 | (India) Prakash Padukone | 11 | 13
8 | (Indonesia) Hadiyanto | 15 | 15
4 | (Indonesia) Rudy Hartono | 15 | 15
5 | (England) Ray Stevens | 1 | 3
3 | (Indonesia) Lius Pongoh | 15 | 15
6 | (Denmark) Morten Frost | 11 | 6
2 | (Japan) Masao Tsuchida | 1 | 2
7 | (Indonesia) Liem Swie King | 15 | 15

Semifinals
(Indonesia) Hadiyanto | 6 | 8
(Indonesia) Rudy Hartono | 15 | 15
(Indonesia) Lius Pongoh | 3 | 3
(Indonesia) Liem Swie King | 15 | 15

Finals
(Indonesia) Rudy Hartono | 15 | 15
(Indonesia) Liem Swie King | 9 | 9
