= 1983 Badminton World Cup =

Badminton championships

Tournament details
- Dates: 16–21 August 1983
- Edition: 5th
- Venue: Stadium Negara
- Location: Kuala Lumpur, Malaysia

The 1983 Badminton World Cup was the fifth edition of an international tournament Badminton World Cup. The event was held in Kuala Lumpur, Malaysia from 16 August to 21 August 1983. China won titles in 3 disciplines : Both the singles events and Women's doubles. South Korea won Men's doubles while cross country pair from Denmark and England won the mixed doubles title.

== Medalists ==
Event	Gold	Silver	Bronze
Men's singles	(China) Han Jian	(Indonesia) Hastomo Arbi	(Indonesia) Icuk Sugiarto
Men's singles	(China) Han Jian	(Indonesia) Hastomo Arbi	(Malaysia) Misbun Sidek
Women's singles	(China) Han Aiping	(China) Zhang Ailing	(China) Li Lingwei
Women's singles	(China) Han Aiping	(China) Zhang Ailing	(Indonesia) Ivana Lie
Men's doubles	(South Korea) Kim Moon-soo (South Korea) Park Joo-bong	(Indonesia) Bobby Ertanto (Indonesia) Christian Hadinata	(Malaysia) Jalani Sidek (Malaysia) Razif Sidek
Men's doubles	(South Korea) Kim Moon-soo (South Korea) Park Joo-bong	(Indonesia) Bobby Ertanto (Indonesia) Christian Hadinata	(Denmark) Jens Peter Nierhoff (Denmark) Morten Frost
Women's doubles	(China) Han Aiping (China) Li Lingwei	(China) Wu Jianqiu (China) Xu Rong	(England) Gillian Clark (England) Gillian Gilks
Women's doubles	(China) Han Aiping (China) Li Lingwei	(China) Wu Jianqiu (China) Xu Rong	(South Korea) Kim Yun-ja (South Korea) Yoo Sang-hee
Mixed doubles	(England) Martin Dew (England) Gillian Gilks	(Indonesia) Christian Hadinata (Indonesia) Ivana Lie	(Denmark) Jesper Helledie (England) Sally Podger
Mixed doubles	(England) Martin Dew (England) Gillian Gilks	(Indonesia) Christian Hadinata (Indonesia) Ivana Lie	(Sweden) Thomas Kihlström (England) Karen Chapman

== Men's singles ==
=== Finals ===
Semi-finals
(China) Han Jian	15	15
(Indonesia) Icuk Sugiarto	6	5
(Indonesia) Hastomo Arbi	15	5	15
(Malaysia) Misbun Sidek	12	15	9

Final
(China) Han Jian	15	15
(Indonesia) Hastomo Arbi	4	13

== Women's singles ==
=== Finals ===
Semi-finals
(China) Li Lingwei	5	1
(China) Han Aiping	11	11
(Indonesia) Ivana Lie	7	6
(China) Zhang Ailing	11	11

Final
(China) Han Aiping	6	11	11
(China) Zhang Ailing	11	5	4

== Men's doubles ==
=== Finals ===
Semi-finals
(South Korea) Kim Moon-soo (South Korea) Park Joo-bong	10	15	15
(Malaysia) Jalani Sidek (Malaysia) Razif Sidek	15	5	7
(Indonesia) Bobby Ertanto (Indonesia) Christian Hadinata	15	4	15
(Denmark) Jens Peter Nierhoff (Denmark) Morten Frost	11	15	13

Final
(South Korea) Kim Moon-soo (South Korea) Park Joo-bong	15	15
(Indonesia) Bobby Ertanto (Indonesia) Christian Hadinata	6	11

== Women's doubles ==
=== Finals ===
Semi-finals
(England) Gillian Clark (England) Gillian Gilks	5	3
(China) Wu Jianqiu (China) Xu Rong	15	15
(South Korea) Kim Yun-ja (South Korea) Yoo Sang-hee	14	3
(China) Han Aiping (China) Li Lingwei	17	15

Final
(China) Wu Jianqiu (China) Xu Rong	15	8	5
(China) Han Aiping (China) Li Lingwei	6	15	15

== Mixed doubles ==
=== Finals ===
Semi-finals
(England) Martin Dew (England) Gillian Gilks	15	15
(Denmark) Jesper Helledie (England) Sally Podger	9	7
(Sweden) Thomas Kihlström (England) Karen Chapman	15	10	4
(Indonesia) Christian Hadinata (Indonesia) Ivana Lie	12	15	15

Final
(England) Martin Dew (England) Gillian Gilks	15	9	15
(Indonesia) Christian Hadinata (Indonesia) Ivana Lie	8	15	8
