= 1984 Badminton World Cup =

Badminton championships

Tournament details
- Dates: 18–23 September 1984
- Edition: 6th
- Total prize money: US$118,000
- Venue: Istora Senayan
- Location: Jakarta, Indonesia

The 1984 Badminton World Cup was the sixth edition of an international tournament Badminton World Cup. The event was held in Jakarta, Indonesia from 18 September to 23 September 1984. China won titles in 3 disciplines : Both the singles events and Women's doubles. Indonesia won Men's doubles while cross country pair from Sweden and England won the mixed doubles title.

== Medalists ==
Event	Gold	Silver	Bronze
Men's singles	(China) Han Jian	(China) Yang Yang	(Indonesia) Liem Swie King
Men's singles	(China) Han Jian	(China) Yang Yang	(Indonesia) Hastomo Arbi
Women's singles	(China) Li Lingwei	(China) Han Aiping	(China) Qian Ping
Women's singles	(China) Li Lingwei	(China) Han Aiping	(Indonesia) Ivana Lie
Men's doubles	(Indonesia) Hariamanto Kartono (Indonesia) Liem Swie King	(China) Li Yongbo (China) Tian Bingyi	(Malaysia) Jalani Sidek (Malaysia) Razif Sidek
Men's doubles	(Indonesia) Hariamanto Kartono (Indonesia) Liem Swie King	(China) Li Yongbo (China) Tian Bingyi	(Indonesia) Christian Hadinata (Indonesia) Hadibowo
Women's doubles	(China) Lin Ying (China) Wu Dixi	(China) Wu Jianqiu (China) Xu Rong	(England) Gillian Clark (England) Nora Perry
Women's doubles	(China) Lin Ying (China) Wu Dixi	(China) Wu Jianqiu (China) Xu Rong	(England) Gillian Gilks (China) Li Lingwei
Mixed doubles	(Sweden) Thomas Kihlström (England) Nora Perry	(Indonesia) Christian Hadinata (Indonesia) Ivana Lie	(England) Martin Dew (England) Gillian Gilks
Mixed doubles	(Sweden) Thomas Kihlström (England) Nora Perry	(Indonesia) Christian Hadinata (Indonesia) Ivana Lie	(Indonesia) Hariamanto Kartono (Indonesia) Imelda Wiguna

== Men's singles ==
=== Finals ===
Semi-finals
(China) Han Jian	17	15
(Indonesia) Liem Swie King	14	13
(China) Yang Yang	15	15
(Indonesia) Hastomo Arbi	8	8

Final
(China) Han Jian	15	15
(China) Yang Yang	12	10

== Women's singles ==
=== Finals ===
Semi-finals
(China) Li Lingwei	11	11
(China) Qian Ping	7	8
(Indonesia) Ivana Lie	11	11	7
(China) Han Aiping	12	6	11

Final
(China) Li Lingwei	10	11	11
(China) Han Aiping	12	4	7

== Men's doubles ==
=== Finals ===
Semi-finals
(China) Li Yongbo (China) Tian Bingyi	15	15
(Malaysia) Jalani Sidek (Malaysia) Razif Sidek	9	1
(Indonesia) Hariamanto Kartono (Indonesia) Liem Swie King	15	15
(Indonesia) Christian Hadinata (Indonesia) Hadibowo	13	10

Final
(China) Li Yongbo (China) Tian Bingyi	8	1
(Indonesia) Hariamanto Kartono (Indonesia) Liem Swie King	15	15

== Women's doubles ==
=== Finals ===
Semi-finals
(England) Gillian Clark (England) Nora Perry	15	9	10
(China) Wu Jianqiu (China) Xu Rong	12	15	15
(China) Lin Ying (China) Wu Dixi	15	15
(England) Gillian Gilks (China) Li Lingwei	3	7

Final
(China) Wu Jianqiu (China) Xu Rong	6	15	7
(China) Lin Ying (China) Wu Dixi	15	7	15

== Mixed doubles ==
=== Finals ===
Semi-finals
(England) Martin Dew (England) Gillian Gilks	15	3	10
(Indonesia) Christian Hadinata (Indonesia) Ivana Lie	4	15	15
(Indonesia) Hariamanto Kartono (Indonesia) Imelda Wiguna	16	7
(Sweden) Thomas Kihlström (England) Nora Perry	18	15

Final
(Indonesia) Christian Hadinata (Indonesia) Ivana Lie	18	13	8
(Sweden) Thomas Kihlström (England) Nora Perry	15	15	15
