= Lius Pongoh =

Indonesian badminton player (born 1960)

Personal information
- Born: 3 December 1960 (age 65) Jakarta, Indonesia

Sport
- Country: Indonesia
- Sport: Badminton
- Handedness: right handed
Medal record
Men's badminton
Representing Indonesia
World Championships
| Bronze medal – third place | 1980 Jakarta | Men's singles |
Thomas Cup
| Gold medal – first place | 1979 Kuala Lumpur | Men's team |
| Silver medal – second place | 1982 London | Men's team |
| Silver medal – second place | 1986 Jakarta | Men's team |
Asian Games
| Bronze medal – third place | 1986 Seoul | Men's team |

Lius Pongoh (born 3 December 1960, in Jakarta; Chinese: 劉邦高) is an Indonesian former badminton player.

== Career ==
Pongoh played singles at a world class level in the 1980s. At nineteen he was a bronze medalist at the 1980 IBF World Championships in Jakarta, losing in the semifinals to fellow countryman Liem Swie King. On the international badminton circuit Pongoh's wins included the Swedish (1981), Indonesia (1984), and Chinese Taipei (1985) Opens, the 1981 Copenhagen Cup (forerunner of the Copenhagen Masters), and the 1982 Indian Masters. He won men's doubles at the 1981 Japan Open with doubles maestro Christian Hadinata where he was also runner-up in singles to the great Rudy Hartono.

Pongoh played second singles for the Indonesian Thomas Cup (men's international) teams of 1982 and 1986, both of which suffered the narrowest of final round losses to arch-rival China. He dropped both of his matches in the '82 series final, but won his only match (under a revised best of five match format) in the '86 series.

== Achievements ==
=== World Championships ===
Men's singles
| Year | Venue | Opponent | Score | Result | Ref. |
|---|---|---|---|---|---|
| 1980 | Istora Senayan, Jakarta, Indonesia | (Indonesia) Liem Swie King | 3–15, 3–15 | Bronze | |

=== International Open Tournaments (9 titles, 8 runners-up) ===
The World Badminton Grand Prix has been sanctioned by the International Badminton Federation from 1983 to 2006.

Men's singles
| Year | Tournament | Opponent | Score | Result | Ref. |
|---|---|---|---|---|---|
| 1981 | Copenhagen Cup | (Indonesia) Hadiyanto | 15–10, 15–9 | (gold) Winner | |
| 1981 | Swedish Open | (Denmark) Morten Frost | 18–14, 15–3 | (gold) Winner | |
| 1981 | Japan Open | (Indonesia) Rudy Hartono | 9–15, 8–15 | (silver) Runner-up | |
| 1982 | India Open | (Indonesia) Icuk Sugiarto | 15–12, 15–5 | (gold) Winner | |
| 1982 | Indonesia Open | (Indonesia) Icuk Sugiarto | 9–15, 8–15 | (silver) Runner-up | |
| 1984 | Indonesia Open | (Indonesia) Hastomo Arbi | 15–5, 10–15, 15–13 | (gold) Winner | |
| 1984 | Victor Cup | (England) Darren Hall | 15–4, 15–3 | (gold) Winner | |
| 1985 | Chinese Taipei Open | (India) Prakash Padukone | 5–15, 15–9, 15–10 | (gold) Winner | |
| 1985 | Scandinavian Open | (Denmark) Morten Frost | 5–15, 8–15 | (silver) Runner-up | |
| 1988 | Indonesia Open | (Indonesia) Icuk Sugiarto | 6–15, 4–15 | (silver) Runner-up | |
| 1988 | Chinese Taipei Open | (Indonesia) Icuk Sugiarto | 8–15, 11–15 | (silver) Runner-up | |
| 1988 | US Open | (Australia) Sze Yu | 15–11, 5–15, 16–17 | (silver) Runner-up | |

Men's doubles
| Year | Tournament | Partner | Opponent | Score | Result | Ref. |
|---|---|---|---|---|---|---|
| 1981 | Japan Open | (Indonesia) Christian Hadinata | (Denmark) Flemming Delfs (India) Prakash Padukone | 15–4, 15–5 | (gold) Winner | |
| 1982 | Denmark Open | (Indonesia) Christian Hadinata | (South Korea) Park Joo-bong (South Korea) Kim Moon-soo | 9–15, 15–11, 16–18 | (silver) Runner-up | |
| 1982 | Swedish Open | (Indonesia) Christian Hadinata | (Sweden) Thomas Kihlström (Sweden) Stefan Karlsson | 15–11, 15–8 | (gold) Winner | |
| 1987 | Canadian Open | (Indonesia) Richard Mainaky | (South Korea) Lee Deuk-choon (South Korea) Lee Sang-bok | 15–11, 8–15, 13–15 | (silver) Runner-up | |
| 1988 | US Open | (Indonesia) Christian Hadinata | (Indonesia) Liem Swie King (India) Prakash Padukone | 7–15, 15–11, 15–13 | (gold) Winner | |

BWF Grand Prix tournament
