= Xu Rong (badminton) =

Chinese badminton player

Xu Rong 徐蓉
Personal information
- Born: 1958 (age 67–68) Nanjing, Jiangsu, China

Sport
- Country: China
- Sport: Badminton
- Event: Women's doubles
Medal record
Women's badminton
Representing China
World Championships
Gold medal – first place	1979 Hangzhou	Women's team
Bronze medal – third place	1979 Hangzhou	Women's singles
Bronze medal – third place	1983 Copenhagen	Women's doubles
World Cup
Silver medal – second place	1983 Kuala Lumpur	Women's doubles
Silver medal – second place	1984 Jakarta	Women's doubles
Uber Cup
Gold medal – first place	1984 Kuala Lumpur	Women's team
Asian Games
Gold medal – first place	1982 New Delhi	Women's team

Xu Rong (born around 1958), is a former badminton player from China, who ranks among the best of her time.

== Career ==
Xu Rong was one of the main Chinese players who dominated the women's game after China joined the International Badminton Federation in 1981 in both singles and doubles. She was well known for her all-rounded excellence on the court, and she won the National Championships in singles (1977). Although primarily a doubles player she was strong enough in singles to reach the final of the Denmark Open, and to win the very first Hong Kong Open in 1982. With her regular partner Wu Jianqui she won the Swedish Open in 1982 and the prestigious All-England Championships in 1983. Xu Rong was also a member of the woman's team that won the Asian Games Team Event in 1982. Xu Rong and Wu were bronze medalists at the 1983 IBF World Championships. In one of her last international appearances Xu won women's doubles at the 1985 Hong Kong Open with Han Aiping. She was the captain of the first China's world champion Uber Cup (women's international) team in 1984, and helped her team to a 5–0 victory. She retired in 1985.

== Achievements ==
=== World Championships ===
Women's singles
Year	Venue	Opponent	Score	Result
1979	Hangzhou, China	(China) Fu Chun-e	1–11, 3–11	Bronze

Women's doubles
Year	Venue	Partner	Opponent	Score	Result
1983	Brøndbyhallen, Copenhagen, Denmark	(China) Wu Jianqiu	(England) Nora Perry (England) Jane Webster	11–15, 8–15	Bronze

=== World Cup ===
Women's doubles
Year	Venue	Partner	Opponent	Score	Result
1983	Stadium Negara, Kuala Lumpur, Malaysia	(China) Wu Jianqiu	(China) Han Aiping (China) Li Lingwei	15–6, 8–15, 5–15	Silver
1984	Istora Senayan, Jakarta, Indonesia	(China) Wu Jianqiu	(China) Lin Ying (China) Wu Dixi	6–15, 15–7, 7–15	Silver

=== IBF World Grand Prix ===
The World Badminton Grand Prix sanctioned by International Badminton Federation (IBF) from 1983 to 2006.

Women's doubles
Year	Tournament	Partner	Opponent	Score	Result
1983	All England Open	(China) Wu Jianqiu	(China) Wu Dixi (China) Lin Ying	15–9, 15–11	(gold) Winner
1983	Indonesia Open	(China) Wu Jianqiu	(Indonesia) Maria Fransisca (Indonesia) Ruth Damayanti	15–11, 11–15, 3–15	(silver) Runner-up
1985	Hong Kong Open	(China) Han Aiping	(China) Wu Dixi (China) Lin Ying	15–4, 15–7	(gold) Winner

=== International tournaments ===
Women's singles
Year	Tournament	Opponent	Score	Result
1982	Denmark Open	(China) Wu Jianqiu	5–11, 0–11	(silver) Runner-up
1982	Hong Kong Open	(Denmark) Lene Koppen	11–4, 11–8	(gold) Winner

Women's doubles
Year	Tournament	Partner	Opponent	Score	Result
1982	Hong Kong Open	(China) Wu Jianqiu	(England) Jane Webster (England) Nora Perry	10–15, 13–15	(silver) Runner-up
1982	German Open	(China) Wu Jianqiu	(China) Lin Ying (China) Wu Dixi	8–15, 15–13, 9–15	(silver) Runner-up
1982	Swedish Open	(China) Wu Jianqiu	(China) Lin Ying (China) Wu Dixi	15–7, 15–12	(gold) Winner
1982	Denmark Open	(China) Wu Jianqiu	(China) Lin Ying (China) Wu Dixi	12–15, 3–15	(silver) Runner-up
