= Nora Perry (badminton) =

English badminton player (born 1954)

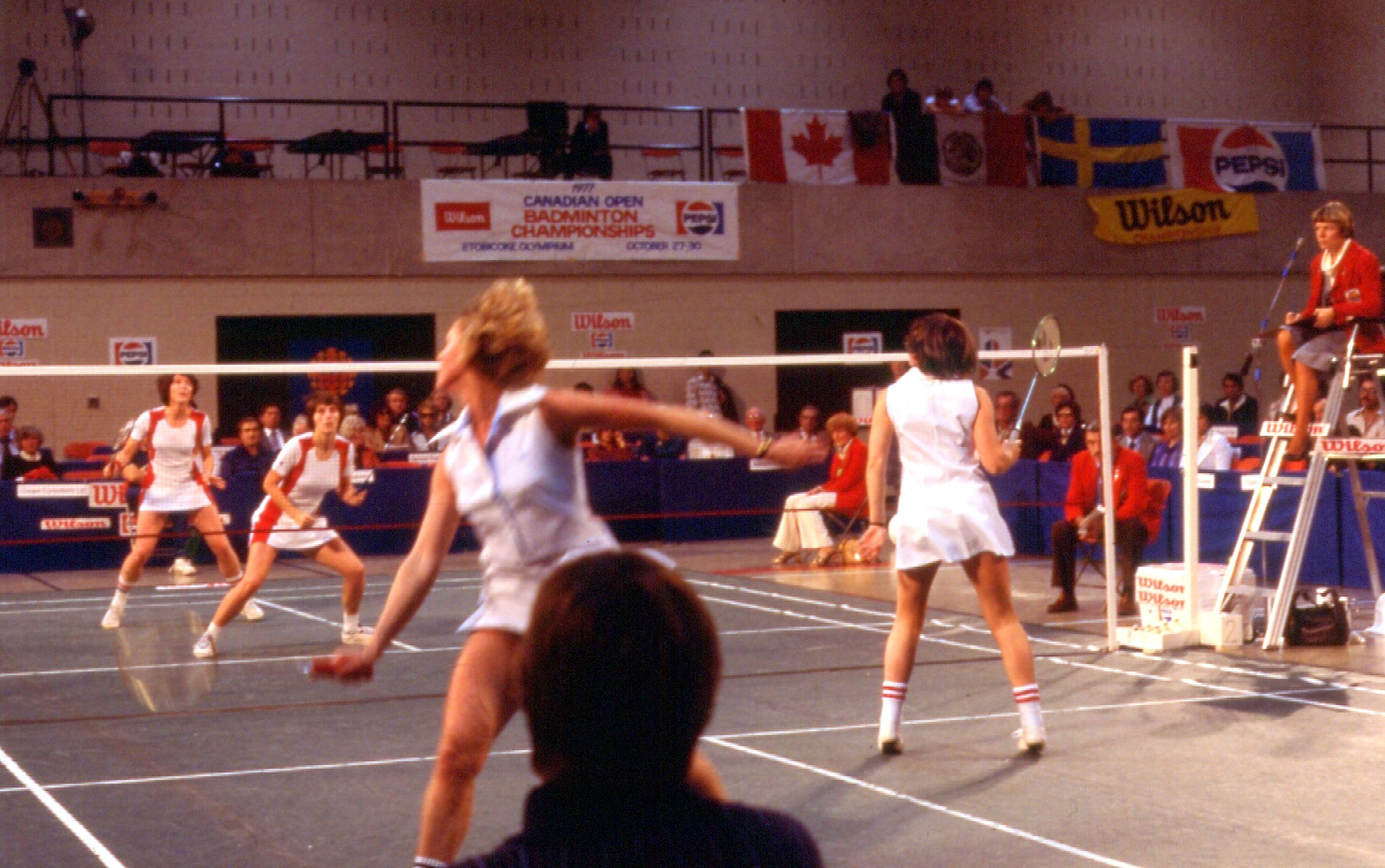

Personal information
- Born: Nora Gardner; 15 June 1954 (age 72)

Sport
- Country: England
- Sport: Badminton
Medal record
Women's badminton
Representing Great Britain
World Games
Silver medal – second place	1981 Santa Clara	Women's doubles
Silver medal – second place	1981 Santa Clara	Mixed doubles
Representing England
World Championships
Gold medal – first place	1980 Jakarta	Women's doubles
Gold medal – first place	1983 Copenhagen	Mixed doubles
Silver medal – second place	1983 Copenhagen	Women's doubles
Silver medal – second place	1980 Jakarta	Mixed doubles
Bronze medal – third place	1977 Malmö	Women's doubles
Bronze medal – third place	1977 Malmö	Mixed doubles
World Cup
Gold medal – first place	1984 Jakarta	Mixed doubles
Silver medal – second place	1985 Jakarta	Mixed doubles
Bronze medal – third place	1980 Kyoto	Women's doubles
Bronze medal – third place	1984 Jakarta	Women's doubles
Uber Cup
Silver medal – second place	1984 Kuala Lumpur	Women's team
Commonwealth Games
Gold medal – first place	1978 Edmonton	Women's doubles
Gold medal – first place	1978 Edmonton	Mixed doubles
Gold medal – first place	1978 Edmonton	Mixed team
Silver medal – second place	1974 Christchurch	Mixed doubles
European Championships
Gold medal – first place	1978 Preston	Women's doubles
Gold medal – first place	1980 Groningen	Women's doubles
Gold medal – first place	1978 Preston	Mixed doubles
Gold medal – first place	1980 Groningen	Mixed doubles
Silver medal – second place	1974 Vienna	Women's doubles
Silver medal – second place	1976 Dublin	Women's doubles
Silver medal – second place	1982 Böblingen	Women's doubles
Silver medal – second place	1982 Böblingen	Mixed doubles
Bronze medal – third place	1976 Dublin	Mixed doubles
European Mixed Team Championships
Gold medal – first place	1974 Vienna	Mixed team
Gold medal – first place	1978 Preston	Mixed team
Gold medal – first place	1982 Böblingen	Mixed team
Silver medal – second place	1976 Dublin	Mixed team
Silver medal – second place	1980 Groningen	Mixed team
European Junior Championships
Silver medal – second place	1971 Gottwaldov	Girls' doubles
Silver medal – second place	1971 Gottwaldov	Mixed doubles

Nora Perry MBE (née Gardner, born 1954) is an English badminton player noted for her anticipation, racket control, and tactical astuteness. A doubles specialist, Perry won numerous major titles, with a variety of partners, from the mid-1970s to the mid-1980s. These included six All-England mixed doubles and two All-England women's doubles championships. She won both the 1980 IBF World Championships and the 1980 European Championships in women's doubles with Jane Webster. Three years later, she won the 1983 IBF World Championships title in mixed doubles with Thomas Kihlström. Partnered with Mike Tredgett, they became the first ever world number one mixed doubles pairing in the inaugural IBF world ranking release in 1978. Generally regarded as one of the greatest female mixed doubles players in the game's history, in 1999 she was inducted into the World Badminton Hall of Fame.

== Early and personal life ==
Nora Gardner was born on 15 June 1954 in Newcastle. Since her junior career, she represented Essex in the national events. She married Joe Perry on 24 December 1976.

== Achievements ==
=== World Championships ===
Women's doubles
Year	Venue	Partner	Opponent	Score	Result
1977	Malmö Isstadion, Malmö, Sweden	(England) Margaret Lockwood	(Netherlands) Marjan Ridder (Netherlands) Joke van Beusekom	15–4, 6–15, 8–15	Bronze
1980	Istora Senayan, Jakarta, Indonesia	(England) Jane Webster	(Indonesia) Imelda Wiguna (Indonesia) Verawaty Wiharjo	15–12, 15–3	Gold
1983	Brøndby Arena, Copenhagen, Denmark	(England) Jane Webster	(China) Lin Ying (China) Wu Dixi	4–15, 12–15	Silver

Mixed doubles
Year	Venue	Partner	Opponent	Score	Result
1977	Malmö Isstadion, Malmö, Sweden	(England) Mike Tredgett	(Denmark) Steen Skovgaard (Denmark) Lene Køppen	15–17, 10–15	Bronze
1980	Istora Senayan, Jakarta, Indonesia	(England) Mike Tredgett	(Indonesia) Christian Hadinata (Indonesia) Imelda Wiguna	12–15, 4–15	Silver
1983	Brøndbyhallen, Copenhagen, Denmark	(Sweden) Thomas Kihlström	(Denmark) Steen Fladberg (Denmark) Pia Nielsen	15–1, 15–11	Gold

=== World Games ===
Women's doubles
Year	Venue	Partner	Opponent	Score	Result
1981	San Jose Civic Auditorium, California, United States	(United Kingdom) Jane Webster	(China) Liu Xia (China) Zhang Ailing	15–11, 4–15, 8–15	Silver

Mixed doubles
Year	Venue	Partner	Opponent	Score	Result
1981	San Jose Civic Auditorium, California, United States	(United Kingdom) Mike Tredgett	(Sweden) Thomas Kihlstrom (United Kingdom) Gillian Gilks	6–15, 14–18	Silver

=== World Cup ===
Women's doubles
Year	Venue	Partner	Opponent	Score	Result
1980	Kyoto, Japan	(England) Jane Webster	(Japan) Atsuko Tokuda (Japan) Yoshiko Yonekura	4–15, 17–16, 5–15	Bronze
1984	Istora Senayan, Jakarta, Indonesia	(England) Gillian Clark	(China) Wu Jianqiu (China) Xu Rong	15–12, 9–15, 10–15	Bronze

Mixed doubles
Year	Venue	Partner	Opponent	Score	Result
1984	Istora Senayan, Jakarta, Indonesia	(Sweden) Thomas Kihlström	(Indonesia) Christian Hadinata (Indonesia) Ivana Lie	15–18, 15–13, 15–8	Gold
1985	Istora Senayan, Jakarta, Indonesia	(Denmark) Steen Fladberg	(Indonesia) Christian Hadinata (Indonesia) Ivana Lie	11–15, 17–18	Silver

=== Commonwealth Games ===
Women's doubles
Year	Venue	Partner	Opponent	Score	Result
1978	Clare Drake Arena, Edmonton, Alberta, Canada	(England) Anne Statt	(Canada) Claire Backhouse (Canada) Jane Youngberg	10–15, 15–2, 15–12	Gold

Mixed doubles
Year	Venue	Partner	Opponent	Score	Result
1974	Cowles Stadium, Christchurch, New Zealand	(England) Paul Whetnall	(England) Derek Talbot (England) Gillian Gilks	walkover	Silver
1978	Clare Drake Arena, Edmonton, Alberta, Canada	(England) Mike Tredgett	(Scotland) Billy Gilliland (Scotland) Joanna Flockhart	15–7, 15–7	Gold

=== European Championships ===
Women's doubles
Year	Venue	Partner	Opponent	Score	Result
1974	Stadthalle, Vienna, Austria	(England) Susan Whetnall	(England) Margaret Beck (England) Gillian Gilks	10–15, 13–15	Silver
1976	Fitzwilliam Club, Dublin, Ireland	(England) Margaret Beck	(England) Gillian Gilks (England) Susan Whetnall	4–15, 8–15	Silver
1978	Guild Hall, Preston, England	(England) Anne Statt	(England) Jane Webster (England) Barbara Sutton	15–7, 15–7	Gold
1980	Martinihal, Groningen, Netherlands	(England) Jane Webster	(Denmark) Kirsten Larsen (Denmark) Pia Nielsen	15–8, 15–13	Gold
1982	Sporthalle, Böblingen, West Germany	(England) Jane Webster	(England) Gillian Gilks (England) Gillian Clark	3–15, 11–15	Silver

Mixed doubles
Year	Venue	Partner	Opponent	Score	Result
1976	Fitzwilliam Club, Dublin, Ireland	(England) Mike Tredgett	(Denmark) Steen Skovgaard (Denmark) Lene Køppen	15–9, 7–15, 4–15	Bronze
1978	Guild Hall, Preston, England	(England) Mike Tredgett	(Denmark) Steen Skovgaard (Denmark) Lene Køppen	15–9, 15–10	Gold
1980	Martinihal, Groningen, Netherlands	(England) Mike Tredgett	(Sweden) Lars Wengberg (Sweden) Anette Börjesson	15–0, 15–6	Gold
1982	Sporthalle, Böblingen, West Germany	(England) Mike Tredgett	(England) Martin Dew (England) Gillian Gilks	12–15, 5–15	Silver

=== European Junior Championships ===
Girls' doubles
Year	Venue	Partner	Opponent	Score	Result
1971	Zimní Stadion; Gottwaldov, Czechoslovakia	(England) Barbara Giles	(Denmark) Lene Køppen (Denmark) Anne Berglund	11–15, 7–15	Silver

Mixed doubles
Year	Venue	Partner	Opponent	Score	Result
1971	Zimní Stadion; Gottwaldov, Czechoslovakia	(England) John Stretch	(England) Peter Gardner (England) Barbara Giles	16–17, 14–18	Silver

=== IBF World Grand Prix ===
The World Badminton Grand Prix was sanctioned by International Badminton Federation (IBF) from 1983 to 2006.

Women's doubles
Year	Tournament	Partner	Opponent	Score	Result
1983	Swedish Open	(England) Jane Webster	(Japan) Shigemi Kawamura (Japan) Sumiko Kitada	15–10, 15–8	(gold) Winner
1983	Malaysia Open	(England) Jane Webster	(South Korea) Kim Yun-ja (South Korea) Yoo Sang-hee	15–11, 4–15, 7–15	(silver) Runner-up
1984	Indonesia Open	(England) Jane Webster	(China) Guan Weizhen (China) Wu Jianqiu	9–15, 18–16, 18–15	(gold) Winner
1985	Chinese Taipei Open	(England) Gillian Clark	(England) Karen Beckman (England) Gillian Gilks	10–15, 17–14, 15–0	(gold) Winner
1985	Denmark Open	(England) Gillian Gilks	(South Korea) Kim Yun-ja (South Korea) Yoo Sang-hee	7–15, 7–15	(silver) Runner-up

Mixed doubles
Year	Tournament	Partner	Opponent	Score	Result
1983	Swedish Open	(Sweden) Thomas Kihlström	(England) Dipak Tailor (England) Barbara Sutton	15–7, 15–1	(gold) Winner
1983	All England Open	(Sweden) Thomas Kihlström	(Denmark) Steen Skovgaard (England) Anne Skovgaard	18–16, 11–15, 15–6	(gold) Winner
1983	Malaysia Open	(England) Martin Dew	(Indonesia) Christian Hadinata (Indonesia) Ivana Lie	5–15, 15–10, 15–6	(gold) Winner
1984	Denmark Open	(England) Dipak Tailor	(Scotland) Billy Gilliland (Indonesia) Imelda Wiguna	Walkover	(gold) Winner
1985	Denmark Open	(England) Dipak Tailor	(England) Martin Dew (England) Gillian Gilks	15–8, 8–15, 15–10	(gold) Winner
1985	All England Open	(Scotland) Billy Gilliland	(Sweden) Thomas Kihlström (England) Gillian Clark	15–10, 15–12	(gold) Winner
1985	Canadian Open	(Scotland) Billy Gilliland	(Denmark) Jesper Helledie (Canada) Johanne Falardeau	15–6, 15–9	(gold) Winner
1986	Chinese Taipei Open	(Scotland) Billy Gilliland	(Denmark) Jesper Helledie (Netherlands) Erica van den Heuvel	15–8, 15–3	(gold) Winner
1986	Japan Open	(Scotland) Billy Gilliland	(England) Nigel Tier (England) Gillian Gowers	17–15, 15–9	(gold) Winner
1986	Poona Open	(Scotland) Billy Gilliland	(Netherlands) Rob Ridder (Netherlands) Erica van den Heuvel	15–6, 15–8	(gold) Winner
1986	Hong Kong Open	(Scotland) Billy Gilliland	(England) Andy Goode (England) Fiona Smith	15–5, 15–3	(gold) Winner
1986	English Masters	(Scotland) Billy Gilliland	(Sweden) Jan-Eric Antonsson (England) Gillian Gowers	12–15, 17–15, 17–14	(gold) Winner

=== International tournaments ===
Women's singles
Year	Tournament	Opponent	Score	Result
1972	Portugal International	(England) Barbara Giles	11–3, 11–9	(gold) Winner
1973	Scottish Open	(Scotland) Joanna Flockhart	6–11, 10–12	(silver) Runner-up
1975	Scottish Open	(Netherlands) Marjan Luesken	6–11, 5–11	(silver) Runner-up

Women's doubles
Year	Tournament	Partner	Opponent	Score	Result
1972	Portugal International	(England) Barbara Giles	(Portugal) Peggy Brixhe (Portugal) Isabel Rocha	15–15, 15–1	(gold) Winner
1973	Portugal International	(England) Barbara Giles	(England) Margaret Beck (Sweden) Eva Twedberg	16–17, 15–10, 15–9	(gold) Winner
1973	Scottish Open	(England) Barbara Giles	(South Africa) Deirdre Tyghe (Northern Ireland) Barbara Beckett	15–12, 11–15, 18–17	(gold) Winner
1975	Scotiish Open	(Netherlands) Marjan Luesken	(Scotland) Helen McIntosh (Scotland) Christine Stewart	15–2, 15–8	(gold) Winner
1975	Swedish Open	(England) Gillian Gilks	(England) Barbara Giles (England) Susan Whetnall	9–15, 15–4, 11–15	(silver) Runner-up
1975	Dutch Open	(England) Susan Whetnall	(Netherlands) Marjan Luesken (Netherlands) Joke van Beusekom	15–3, 15–5	(gold) Winner
1976	All England Open	(England) Margaret Lockwood	(England) Gillian Gilks (England) Susan Whetnall	10–15, 10–15	(silver) Runner-up
1976	Canadian Open	(England) Margaret Lockwood	(Netherlands) Marjan Ridder (Netherlands) Joke van Beusekom	17–14, 15–9	(gold) Winner
1976	Scottish Open	(England) Margaret Lockwood	(England) Gillian Gilks (England) Susan Whetnall	5–15, 2–15	(silver) Runner-up
1977	All England Open	(England) Margaret Lockwood	(Japan) Etsuko Toganoo (Japan) Emiko Ueno	15–7, 3–15, 7–15	(silver) Runner-up
1977	Canadian Open	(England) Karen Puttick	(England) Barbara Sutton (England) Jane Webster	15–8, 15–9	(gold) Winner
1978	Swedish Open	(England) Anne Statt	(England) Gillian Gilks (England) Paula Kilvington	15–9, 15–7	(gold) Winner
1978	Dutch Open	(England) Anne Statt	(Netherlands) Marjan Ridder (Netherlands) Joke van Beusekom	15–5, 15–6	(gold) Winner
1978	German Open	(England) Anne Statt	(England) Barbara Sutton (England) Jane Webster	17–15, 15–5	(gold) Winner
1979	Denmark Open	(Denmark) Anne Skovgaard	(Japan) Atsuko Tokuda (Japan) Mikiko Takada	11–15, 9–15	(silver) Runner-up
1979	Swedish Open	(Denmark) Anne Skovgaard	(Denmark) Lene Køppen (Netherlands) Joke van Beusekom	10–15, 10–15	(silver) Runner-up
1979	English Masters	(England) Jane Webster	(Japan) Atsuko Tokuda (Japan) Yoshiko Yonekura	15–2, 8–15, 15–10	(gold) Winner
1980	Canadian Open	(England) Jane Webster	(Canada) Wendy Carter (Canada) Jane Youngberg	15–2, 15–5	(gold) Winner
1980	Copenhagen Cup	(England) Gillian Gilks	(Denmark) Lene Køppen (Netherlands) Joke van Beusekom	10–15, 15–2, 15–0	(gold) Winner
1980	Welsh International	(England) Jane Webster	(England) Gillian Gilks (England) Paula Kilvington	17–14, 9–15, 11–15	(silver) Runner-up
1980	Chinese Taipei Open	(England) Jane Webster	(Denmark) Lene Køppen (Denmark) Kirsten Larsen	15–5, 15–7	(gold) Winner
1980	Denmark Open	(England) Gillian Gilks	(Japan) Atsuko Tokuda (Japan) Yoshiko Yonekura	18–15, 9–15, 15–9	(gold) Winner
1980	Bell's Open	(England) Jane Webster	(England) Gillian Gilks (England) Paula Kilvington	8–15, 6–15	(silver) Runner-up
1980	All England Open	(England) Gillian Gilks	(Japan) Atsuko Tokuda (Japan) Yoshiko Yonekura	11–15, 15–7, 15–6	(gold) Winner
1980	English Masters	(England) Jane Webster	(Japan) Atsuko Tokuda (Japan) Yoshiko Yonekura	14–18, 15–6, 12–15	(silver) Runner-up
1981	Canadian Open	(England) Jane Webster	(China) Sang Yanqing (China) Si-an Deng	18–14, 15–11	(gold) Winner
1981	Copenhagen Cup	(England) Jane Webster	(England) Gillian Gilks (England) Paula Kilvington	12–15, 8–15	(silver) Runner-up
1981	Chinese Taipei Open	(England) Jane Webster	(Chinese Taipei) Chern Yuk-jen (Chinese Taipei) Hwang Hsiu-chi	15–5, 15–6	(gold) Winner
1981	Japan Open	(England) Jane Webster	(Japan) Atsuko Tokuda (Japan) Yoshiko Yonekura	6–15, 15–7, 8–15	(silver) Runner-up
1981	Denmark Open	(England) Jane Webster	(Japan) Atsuko Tokuda (Japan) Yoshiko Yonekura	15–12, 18–15	(gold) Winner
1981	Swedish Open	(England) Sally Podger	(Japan) Kimiko Jinnai (Japan) Kazuko Takamine	15–6, 15–6	(gold) Winner
1981	All England Open	(England) Jane Webster	(England) Gillian Gilks (England) Paula Kilvington	15–8, 15–4	(gold) Winner
1981	Dutch Open	(England) Jane Webster	(England) Gillian Gilks (England) Paula Kilvington	7–15, 8–15	(silver) Runner-up
1981	India Open	(England) Jane Webster	(China) Lin Ying (China) Wu Dixi	17–14, 13–15, 17–15	(gold) Winner
1981	Scandinavian Cup	(England) Jane Webster	(China) Zhang Ailing (China) Liu Xia	15–12, 15–9	(gold) Winner
1982	Chinese Taipei Open	(England) Jane Webster	(Indonesia) Verawaty Fadjrin (Indonesia) Ruth Damyanti	15–8, 18–17	(gold) Winner
1982	Bell's Open	(England) Jane Webster	(England) Gillian Gilks (England) Catharine Troke	15–4, 15–5	(gold) Winner
1982	Japan Open	(England) Jane Webster	(Indonesia) Verawaty Fadjrin (Indonesia) Ruth Damyanti	3–15, 15–7, 15–12	(gold) Winner
1982	Hong Kong Open	(England) Jane Webster	(China) Wu Jianqiu (China) Xu Rong	15–10, 15–13	(gold) Winner
1982	Scandinavian Cup	(England) Jane Webster	(Japan) Atsuko Tokuda (Japan) Yoshiko Yonekura	11–15, 15–9, 15–4	(gold) Winner
1982	Welsh International	(England) Jane Webster	(England) Karen Chapman (England) Sally Podger	15–8, 17–14	(gold) Winner
1982	Portugal International	(England) Catharine Troke	(Sweden) Eva Stuart (England) Paula Kilvington	15–9, 15–4	(gold) Winner
1983	Chinese Taipei Open	(England) Jane Webster	(England) Gillian Clark (England) Gillian Gilks	10–15, 14–15	(silver) Runner-up
1983	Japan Open	(England) Jane Webster	(England) Gillian Clark (England) Gillian Gilks	6–15, 8–15	(silver) Runner-up
1984	English Masters	(England) Gillian Clark	(China) Lin Ying (China) Wu Dixi	5–15, 1–15	(silver) Runner-up
1984	Dutch Masters	(England) Gillian Clark	(China) Lin Ying (China) Wu Dixi	4–15, 9–15	(silver) Runner-up

Mixed doubles

Year	Tournament	Partner	Opponent	Score	Result
1972	Portugal International	(England) Eddy Sutton	(England) William Kidd (England) Barbara Giles	4–15, 15–11, 10–15	(silver) Runner-up
1973	Portugal International	(England) Elliot Stuart	(England) Ray Stevens (England) Barbara Giles	10–15, 15–14, 12–15	(silver) Runner-up
1973	All England Open	(England) Elliot Stuart	(England) Derek Talbot (England) Gillian Gilks	15–9, 13–15, 8–15	(silver) Runner-up
1973	Dutch Open	(England) Elliot Stuart	(England) Derek Talbot (England) Gillian Gilks	15–13, 6–15, 5–15	(silver) Runner-up
1974	Scottish Open	(England) Paul Whetnall	(England) Mike Tredgett (England) Margaret Boxall	15–4, 18–14	(gold) Winner
1975	Scottish Open	(England) Elliot Stuart	(Scotland) Fraser Gow (Scotland) Helen McIntosh	15–5, 12–15, 15–4	(gold) Winner
1975	All England Open	(England) Elliot Stuart	(Germany) Roland Maywald (Germany) Brigitte Steden	15–9, 15–3	(gold) Winner
1975	Swedish Open	(England) Mike Tredgett	(England) Elliot Stuart (England) Susan Whetnall	15–12, 15–6	(gold) Winner
1976	German Open	(England) Mike Tredgett	(Denmark) Steen Skovgaard (Denmark) Lene Køppen	15–9, 15–10	(gold) Winner
1976	Scottish Open	(England) Mike Tredgett	(England) Derek Talbot (England) Gillian Gilks	17–18, 9–15	(silver) Runner-up
1977	All England Open	(England) Mike Tredgett	(England) Derek Talbot (England) Gillian Gilks	9–15, 9–15	(silver) Runner-up
1977	Canadian Open	(England) David Eddy	(Denmark) Steen Skovgaard (England) Jane Webster	15–4, 15–12	(gold) Winner
1978	Dutch Open	(England) Mike Tredgett	(Scotland) Billy Gilliland (Scotland) Joanna Flockhart	15–8, 15–9	(gold) Winner
1978	Denmark Open	(England) Mike Tredgett	(Denmark) Steen Skovgaard (Denmark) Lene Køppen	9–15, 11–15	(silver) Runner-up
1978	All England Open	(England) Mike Tredgett	(Denmark) Steen Skovgaard (Denmark) Lene Køppen	15–7, 15–4	(gold) Winner
1978	Swedish Open	(England) Mike Tredgett	(Denmark) Steen Skovgaard (Denmark) Lene Køppen	15–2, 15–9	(gold) Winner
1978	German Open	(England) Mike Tredgett	(Netherlands) Rob Ridder (Netherlands) Marjan Ridder	11–15, 15–6, 10–15	(silver) Runner-up
1979	Swedish Open	(England) Mike Tredgett	(Denmark) Steen Skovgaard (Denmark) Lene Køppen	12–15, 18–17, 18–16	(gold) Winner
1979	Denmark Open	(England) Ray Stevens	(Denmark) Steen Skovgaard (Denmark) Lene Køppen	15–12, 11–15, 15–13	(gold) Winner
1979	All England Open	(England) Mike Tredgett	(Indonesia) Christian Hadinata (Indonesia) Imelda Wiguna	1–15, 17–18	(silver) Runner-up
1980	Canadian Open	(England) Mike Tredgett	(Denmark) Steen Fladberg (Canada) Johanne Falardeau	15–7, 15–9	(gold) Winner
1980	Denmark Open	(England) Mike Tredgett	(Denmark) Steen Skovgaard (Denmark) Lene Køppen	15–11, 15–8	(gold) Winner
1980	All England Open	(England) Mike Tredgett	(Indonesia) Christian Hadinata (Indonesia) Imelda Wiguna	18–13, 15–10	(gold) Winner
1980	Welsh International	(England) Mike Tredgett	(Scotland) Billy Gilliland (England) Karen Chapman	10–15, 15–11, 15–10	(gold) Winner
1981	Copenhagen Cup	(England) Mike Tredgett	(Netherlands) Rob Ridder (Netherlands) Marjan Ridder	15–12, 15–6	(gold) Winner
1981	Denmark Open	(England) Mike Tredgett	(Indonesia) Christian Hadinata (Indonesia) Imelda Wiguna	15–2, 15–2	(gold) Winner
1981	Swedish Open	(Scotland) Billy Gilliland	(England) Martin Dew (England) Gillian Clark	15–4, 18–14	(gold) Winner
1981	All England Open	(England) Mike Tredgett	(Indonesia) Christian Hadinata (Indonesia) Imelda Wiguna	10–15, 18–14, 15–10	(gold) Winner
1981	English Masters	(England) Mike Tredgett	(Denmark) Morten Frost (Denmark) Lene Køppen	15–5, 15–6	(gold) Winner
1981	Bell's Open	(Scotland) Billy Gilliland	(England) Martin Dew (England) Gillian Gilks	17–16, 15–10	(gold) Winner
1981	Canadian Open	(England) Ray Stevens	(Sweden) Thomas Kihlström (England) Gillian Gilks	15–12, 6–15, 0–15	(silver) Runner-up
1981	Dutch Open	(England) Mike Tredgett	(Sweden) Thomas Kihlström (England) Gillian Gilks	12–15, 6–15	(silver) Runner-up
1981	India Open	(England) Ray Stevens	(Scotland) Billy Gilliland (England) Karen Chapman	15–12, 15–3	(gold) Winner
1981	Scandinavian Cup	(England) Mike Tredgett	(Denmark) Steen Skovgaard (England) Jane Webster	15–12, 15–8	(gold) Winner
1982	Japan Open	(England) Mike Tredgett	(England) Martin Dew (England) Jane Webster	15–10, 15–2	(gold) Winner
1982	Denmark Open	(Sweden) Thomas Kihlström	(England) Martin Dew (England) Gillian Gilks	15–11, 15–9	(gold) Winner
1982	Victor Cup	(Sweden) Thomas Kihlström	(England) Martin Dew (England) Gillian Gilks	9–15, 15–9, 15–9	(gold) Winner
1982	Bell's Open	(England) Ray Stevens	(Scotland) Billy Gilliland (England) Gillian Gilks	11–15, 7–7 ret.	(silver) Runner-up
1982	Scandinavian Cup	(Sweden) Thomas Kihlström	(Denmark) Steen Fladberg (Denmark) Pia Nielsen	18–15, 15–12	(gold) Winner
1982	Welsh International	(England) Dipak Tailor	(England) Mike Tredgett (England) Gillian Clark	18–14, 15–11	(gold) Winner
1982	Portugal International	(England) Ray Stevens	(Scotland) Billy Gilliland (Sweden) Eva Stuart	15–9, 15–9	(gold) Winner
1983	Japan Open	(Sweden) Thomas Kihlström	(England) Martin Dew (England) Jane Webster	15–5, 15–2	(gold) Winner
1983	Denmark Open	(Sweden) Thomas Kihlström			(gold) Winner
1985	Malaysia Masters	(Denmark) Steen Fladberg	(Sweden) Thomas Kihlström (Sweden) Christine Magnusson	15–9, 15–5	(gold) Winner
1985	Malaysia Masters	(Denmark) Steen Fladberg	(England) Martin Dew (England) Gillian Gilks	17–15, 15–12	(gold) Winner
1985	Malaysia Masters	(Denmark) Steen Fladberg	(Sweden) Stefan Karlsson (Sweden) Maria Bengtsson	15–10, 9–15, 10–15	(gold) Winner
