= Hastomo Arbi =

Indonesian badminton player (born 1958)

Personal information
- Born: Ang Tjong Hauw 洪忠和; 5 August 1958 (age 68) Kudus, Central Java, Indonesia
- Height: 1.62 m (5 ft 4 in)

Sport
- Country: Indonesia
- Sport: Badminton
- Handedness: Right
- Event: Men's singles
Medal record
Men's badminton
Representing Indonesia
World Cup
Silver medal – second place	1983 Kuala Lumpur	Men's singles
Bronze medal – third place	1984 Jakarta	Men's singles
World Senior Championships
Gold medal – first place	2015 Helsingborg	Men's singles 55+
Gold medal – first place	2025 Pattaya	Men's singles 65+
Gold medal – first place	2025 Pattaya	Men's doubles 65+
Thomas Cup
Gold medal – first place	1984 Kuala Lumpur	Men's team
SEA Games
Gold medal – first place	1979 Jakarta	Men's singles
Gold medal – first place	1979 Jakarta	Men's team
Gold medal – first place	1981 Manila	Men's team
Gold medal – first place	1983 Singapore	Men's team
Silver medal – second place	1981 Manila	Men's singles
Silver medal – second place	1983 Singapore	Men's singles

Hastomo Arbi (born Ang Tjong Hauw, 5 August 1958, in Kudus, Central Java) is a retired male Chinese Indonesian badminton player who represented Indonesia.

== Career ==
He was active as an international level player from the late 1970s to the mid-1980s. He is the older brother of Hariyanto Arbi, an Indonesian player of the 1990s who won men's singles at the 1995 IBF World Championships and Eddy Hartono who was a silver men's doubles medalist at the 1992 Summer Olympics.

Arbi, who developed his game at PB Djarum, is best remembered for helping Indonesia regain the Thomas Cup (men's world team championship) from China in 1984 by upsetting China's Han Jian in the second singles match. In 1979 he won men's singles at the SEA Games.

== Achievements ==
=== World Cup ===
Men's singles
Year	Venue	Opponent	Score	Result	Ref.
1983	Stadium Negara; Kuala Lumpur, Malaysia	(China) Han Jian	4–15, 13–15	Silver	
1984	Istora Senayan; Jakarta, Indonesia	(China) Yang Yang	8–15, 8–15	Bronze	

=== World Senior Championships ===
Men's singles
Year	Age	Venue	Opponent	Score	Result	Ref.
2015	55+	Helsingborg Arena; Helsingborg, Sweden	(Canada) Jack Keith Priestman	21–11, 21–13	Gold	
2025	65+	Eastern National Sports Training Centre; Pattaya, Thailand	(Japan) Hiroyuki Koike	21–11, 21–7	Gold	

Men's doubles
Year	Age	Venue	Partner	Opponent	Score	Result	Ref.
2025	65+	Eastern National Sports Training Centre; Pattaya, Thailand	(Indonesia) Simbarsono Sutanto	(Australia) Garry Silvester (Australia) Loke Poh Wong	13–21, 21–17, 21–16	Gold	

=== SEA Games ===
Men's singles
Year	Venue	Opponent	Score	Result
1979	Gema Sumantri Hall; Jakarta, Indonesia	(Thailand) Udom Luangpetcharaporn	15–11, 15–4	Gold
1981	Manila, Philippines	(Indonesia) Liem Swie King	2–15, 7–15	Silver
1983	Singapore Badminton Hall, Singapore	(Singapore) Wong Shoon Keat	15–9, 2–15, 11–15	Silver

=== International tournaments ===
The World Badminton Grand Prix sanctioned by International Badminton Federation (IBF) from 1983 to 2006.

Men's singles
Year	Tournament	Opponent	Score	Result
1983	Malaysia Open	(Indonesia) Liem Swie King	1–15, 11–15	(silver) Runner-up
1983	Indonesia Open	(Indonesia) Liem Swie King	6–15, 1–15	(silver) Runner-up
1983	Holland Masters	(Indonesia) Icuk Sugiarto	11–15, 6–15	(silver) Runner-up
1984	Chinese Taipei Open	(Denmark) Morten Frost	11–15, 7–15	(silver) Runner-up
1984	Indonesia Open	(Indonesia) Lius Pongoh	5–15, 15–10, 13–15	(silver) Runner-up

IBF Grand Prix tournament
IBF Grand Prix Finals tournament
