= 1984 Thomas & Uber Cup =

Biennial international badminton team championship

1984 Thomas & Uber Cup Piala Thomas dan Uber 1984

Tournament details
- Dates: 7 – 18 May 1984
- Edition: 13th (Thomas Cup); 10th (Uber Cup)
- Level: International
- Nations: 8 (Thomas Cup); 8 (Uber Cup)
- Venue: Stadium Negara
- Location: Kuala Lumpur, Malaysia
- Official website: bwfthomasubercups.com

The 1984 Thomas Cup & Uber Cup was the 13th tournament of Thomas Cup and the tenth tournament of Uber Cup, the most important badminton team competitions in the world.

On 4 May 1983, the International Badminton Federation announced that both the Thomas Cup and the Uber Cup will be combined and held simultaneously starting from 1984. The International Badminton Federation also announced that the Cup qualifiers and the final tournament will be played in a best-of-5 format as opposed to the previous best-of-9 format.

Indonesia won its eighth title in the Thomas Cup, after beating China in the final round; and China won its first title in the Uber Cup, after beating England in the final.

== Host selection ==
Kuala Lumpur was named as the host on 8 March 1983 by the IBF after defending Thomas Cup champions China declined the offer to host the tournament. Stadium Negara was the venue chosen to host the tournament.

== Qualification ==
Malaysia qualified automatically for both the Thomas Cup and the Uber Cup as hosts. China and Japan qualified for the Thomas Cup and the Uber Cup respectively as trophy holders.

=== Thomas Cup ===
Means of qualification	Date	Venue	Slot	Qualified teams
Host country	8 March 1983	Kuala Lumpur	1	Malaysia
1982 Thomas Cup	10 – 21 May 1982	England	1	China
Asian Zone	20 – 25 February 1984	Hong Kong	2	Indonesia
Asian Zone	22 – 26 February 1984	New Delhi	2	South Korea
European Zone	23 – 26 February 1984	Ostend	3	Denmark
European Zone	23 – 26 February 1984	Ostend	3	England
European Zone	23 – 26 February 1984	Ostend	3	Sweden
Pan American Zone	22 – 25 February 1984	Toronto	1	Japan
Total			8	

=== Uber Cup ===
Means of qualification	Date	Venue	Slot	Qualified teams
Host country	8 March 1983	Kuala Lumpur	1	Malaysia
1981 Uber Cup	22 – 31 May 1981	Tokyo	1	Japan
Asian Zone	20 – 25 February 1984	Hong Kong	3	China
Asian Zone	22 – 26 February 1984	New Delhi	3	Indonesia
Asian Zone	22 – 26 February 1984	New Delhi	3	South Korea
European Zone	23 – 26 February 1984	Ostend	2	Denmark
European Zone	23 – 26 February 1984	Ostend	2	England
Pan American Zone	22 – 25 February 1984	Toronto	1	Canada
Total			8	

== Medal summary ==
=== Medalists ===
Event	Gold	Silver	Bronze
Thomas Cup	Indonesia	China	England
Uber Cup	China	England	South Korea

=== Medal table ===
* Host nation (Malaysia)

Rank	Nation	Gold	Silver	Bronze	Total
1	China	1	1	0	2
2	Indonesia	1	0	0	1
3	England	0	1	1	2
4	South Korea	0	0	1	1
Totals (4 entries)		2	2	2	6

== Thomas Cup ==
=== Group stage ===
==== Group A ====
Pos	Team	Pld	W	L	GF	GA	GD	PF	PA	PD	Pts	Qualification
1	Indonesia	3	3	0	26	7	+19	471	292	+179	3	Advance to semi-finals
2	England	3	2	1	19	16	+3	450	435	+15	2	Advance to semi-finals
3	Malaysia	3	1	2	17	19	−2	455	441	+14	1	
4	Japan	3	0	3	6	26	−20	245	453	−208	0	

Source: The Straits Times

7 May 1984
18:30 UTC+8

Malaysia	5–0	Japan
Report

Stadium Negara, Kuala Lumpur

8 May 1984
18:30 UTC+8

Indonesia	3–2	England
Report

Stadium Negara, Kuala Lumpur

9 May 1984
18:30 UTC+8

England	4–1	Japan
Report

Stadium Negara, Kuala Lumpur

10 May 1984
18:30 UTC+8

Indonesia	5–0	Malaysia
Report

Stadium Negara, Kuala Lumpur

11 May 1984
18:30 UTC+8

Indonesia	4–1	Japan
Report

Stadium Negara, Kuala Lumpur

12 May 1984
18:30 UTC+8

England	3–2	Malaysia
Report

Stadium Negara, Kuala Lumpur

==== Group B ====
Pos	Team	Pld	W	L	GF	GA	GD	PF	PA	PD	Pts	Qualification
1	China	3	3	0	26	11	+15	494	367	+127	3	Advance to semi-finals
2	South Korea	3	2	1	21	16	+5	472	412	+60	2	Advance to semi-finals
3	Denmark	3	1	2	20	17	+3	452	412	+40	1	
4	Sweden	3	0	3	6	29	−23	284	511	−227	0	

Source: The Straits Times

7 May 1984
18:30 UTC+8

Denmark	4–1	Sweden
Report

Stadium Negara, Kuala Lumpur

8 May 1984
18:30 UTC+8

China	4–1	South Korea
Report

Stadium Negara, Kuala Lumpur

9 May 1984
18:30 UTC+8

China	3–2	Denmark
Report

Stadium Negara, Kuala Lumpur

10 May 1984
18:30 UTC+8

South Korea	5–0	Sweden
Report

Stadium Negara, Kuala Lumpur

11 May 1984
18:30 UTC+8

Denmark	2–3	South Korea
Report

Stadium Negara, Kuala Lumpur

12 May 1984
18:30 UTC+8

China	5–0	Sweden
Report

Stadium Negara, Kuala Lumpur

=== Knockout stage ===
==== Bracket ====
Semi-finals
Indonesia	4
South Korea	1
England	1
China	4

Final
Indonesia	3
China	2
Third place
England	3
South Korea	2

==== Semi-finals ====
14 May 1984
19:00 UTC+8

Indonesia	4–1	South Korea
Report

Stadium Negara, Kuala Lumpur

15 May 1984
19:00 UTC+8

China	4–1	England
Report

Stadium Negara, Kuala Lumpur

==== Third place ====
16 May 1984
19:00 UTC+8

England	3–2	South Korea
Report

Stadium Negara, Kuala Lumpur

==== Final ====
18 May 1984
19:00 UTC+8

China	2–3	Indonesia
Report

Stadium Negara, Kuala Lumpur

1984 Thomas Cup winner

Indonesia
Eighth title

== Uber Cup ==
=== Group stage ===
==== Group A ====
Pos	Team	Pld	W	L	GF	GA	GD	PF	PA	PD	Pts	Qualification
1	England	3	3	0	26	8	+18	372	249	+123	3	Advance to semi-finals
2	South Korea	3	2	1	25	8	+17	380	217	+163	2	Advance to semi-finals
3	Canada	3	1	2	9	23	−14	234	328	−94	1	
4	Malaysia	3	0	3	6	27	−21	193	385	−192	0	

Source: The Straits Times

7 May 1984
18:30 UTC+8

England	4–1	Canada
Report

Stadium Negara, Kuala Lumpur

8 May 1984
18:30 UTC+8

South Korea	5–0	Malaysia
Report

Stadium Negara, Kuala Lumpur

9 May 1984
18:30 UTC+8

England	4–1	Malaysia
Report

Stadium Negara, Kuala Lumpur

10 May 1984
18:30 UTC+8

South Korea	5–0	Canada
Report

Stadium Negara, Kuala Lumpur

11 May 1984
18:30 UTC+8

Canada	3–2	Malaysia
Report

Stadium Negara, Kuala Lumpur

12 May 1984
18:30 UTC+8

England	3–2	South Korea
Report

Stadium Negara, Kuala Lumpur

==== Group B ====
Pos	Team	Pld	W	L	GF	GA	GD	PF	PA	PD	Pts	Qualification
1	China	3	3	0	30	3	+27	412	203	+209	3	Advance to semi-finals
2	Denmark	3	2	1	15	20	−5	316	358	−42	2	Advance to semi-finals
3	Japan	3	1	2	13	22	−9	296	377	−81	1	
4	Indonesia	3	0	3	12	25	−13	324	410	−86	0	

Source: The Straits Times

7 May 1984
18:30 UTC+8

China	5–0	Indonesia
Report

Stadium Negara, Kuala Lumpur

8 May 1984
18:30 UTC+8

Japan	2–3	Denmark
Report

Stadium Negara, Kuala Lumpur

9 May 1984
18:30 UTC+8

Japan	3–2	Indonesia
Report

Stadium Negara, Kuala Lumpur

10 May 1984
18:30 UTC+8

China	5–0	Denmark
Report

Stadium Negara, Kuala Lumpur

11 May 1984
18:30 UTC+8

China	5–0	Japan
Report

Stadium Negara, Kuala Lumpur

12 May 1984
18:30 UTC+8

Indonesia	2–3	Denmark
Report

Stadium Negara, Kuala Lumpur

=== Knockout stage ===
==== Bracket ====
Semi-finals
China	5
South Korea	0
Denmark	1
England	4

Final
China	5
England	0
Third place
South Korea	5
Denmark	0

==== Semi-finals ====
14 May 1984
19:00 UTC+8

China	5–0	South Korea
Report

Stadium Negara, Kuala Lumpur

15 May 1984
19:00 UTC+8

England	3–2	Denmark
Report

Stadium Negara, Kuala Lumpur

==== Third place ====
16 May 1984
19:00 UTC+8

South Korea	5–0	Denmark
Report

Stadium Negara, Kuala Lumpur

==== Final ====
17 May 1984
19:00 UTC+8

China	5–0	England
Report

Stadium Negara, Kuala Lumpur

1984 Uber Cup winner

China
First title
