= List of Olympic medalists in badminton =

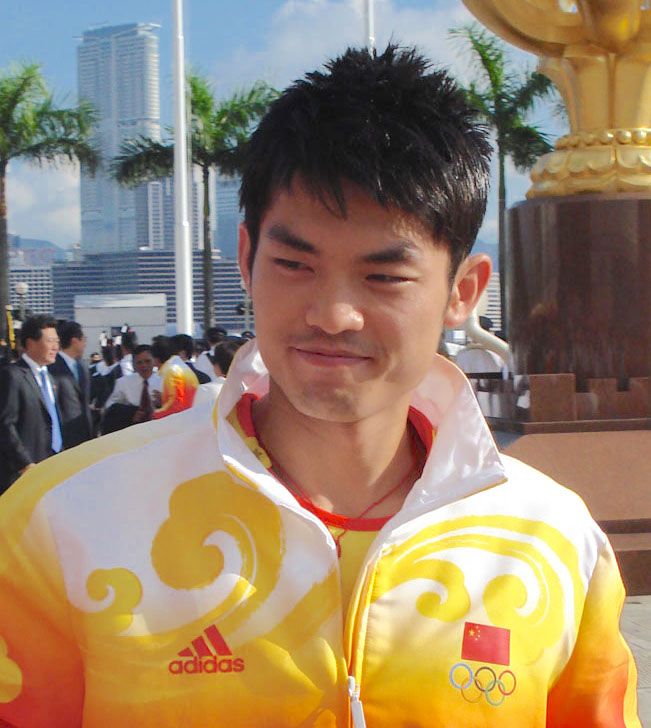
Lin Dan is the first player in mens single to win consecutive golds in the 2008 and 2012 Summer Olympics.

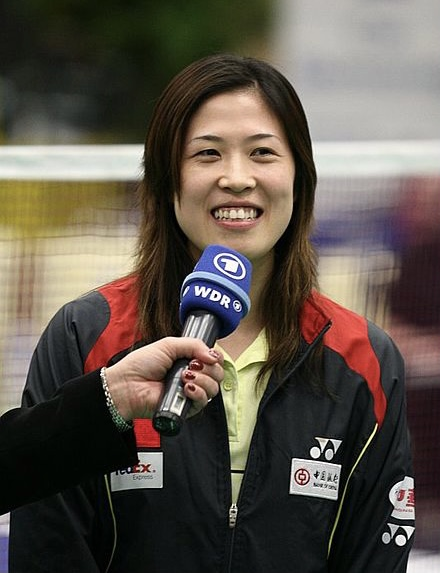
Gao Ling won a total of 4 olympic medals in badminton, with 2 being consecutive mixed doubles gold

Badminton is a sport contested at the Summer Olympic Games. Badminton was first held as a demonstration sport at the 1972 Summer Olympics, and was an exhibition sport at the 1988 Summer Olympics; the men's and women's singles and doubles have been held at every Summer Olympics since the 1992 Summer Olympics. The mixed doubles badminton tournament started in the 1996 Summer Olympics.

The Badminton World Federation (BWF) rankings are used to determine the qualification of the players for the tournament. Nations can enter a maximum of two players each in the men's and women's singles if both are ranked in the world's top 16; otherwise, one quota place until the roster of thirty-eight players has been completed. Similar regulations also apply to the players competing in the doubles, as the NOCs (National Olympic Committees) can enter a maximum of two pairs if both are ranked in the top eight, while the remaining NOCs are entitled to one until the quota of 16 highest-ranked pairs is filled. The host nation, if it has not already qualified two competitors, receives at least either two singles players or one pair.

Gao Ling is the all-time leader for the most Olympic medals in badminton, with two golds, one silver, and one bronze; Fu Haifeng (two golds, one silver), Zhang Nan, Zhao Yunlei, Viktor Axelsen and Kim Dong-moon (two golds, one bronze) each, Gil Young-ah and Chen Long (one each) and Lee Chong Wei (three silvers) are second for the most medals in badminton, each with three. Fu Haifeng, Gao Ling, Ge Fei, Gu Jun, Kim Dong-moon, Lee Yang, Lin Dan, Viktor Axelsen, Wang Chi Lin, Zhang Jun, Zhang Nan, Zhang Ning and Zhao Yunlei are the all-time leaders for the most gold medal wins, with two. In the 1992 Summer Olympics, future married couple Susi Susanti and Alan Budikusuma won Indonesia their first ever Olympic gold medals since their first Olympic participation in 1952, while brothers Jalani and Razif Sidek were the first Malaysian Olympic medalists since Malaysia first participated in the 1964 Summer Olympics. Mia Audina won her first silver in the 1996 Olympics representing Indonesia, but won her second silver in the 2004 Summer Olympics with the Netherlands, the only badminton medalist to ever win for two different countries. In the 2000 Summer Olympics, China swept the women's doubles tournament, winning all three medals, making it the only sweep in Olympic badminton history. Indonesia also did this in the 1992 Olympics men's singles tournament, but there was no bronze medal match in that Games so the medal was shared with Danish player Thomas Stuer-Lauridsen. In the 2012 Summer Olympics, China became the first country to win all five disciplines' gold medal in history, and as of 2024 the only clean sweep in the same Games. Indonesia became the second to achieve this feat, stretching from its first gold in the 1992 women's singles to 2020 women's doubles.

As of the 2024 Summer Olympics, China has been the most successful nation in badminton, winning 52 medals; 37 of them were from the women's singles and doubles and mixed doubles tournaments. Indonesia, South Korea (both 22 medals), and Malaysia (11) are the only other nations to have more than ten medals. As many as 126 medals (44 gold, 44 silver, and 48 bronze) have been awarded to 168 medalists from 13 NOCs. There were four additional bronze medal winners in the 1992 Summer Olympics because no bronze medal matches were played in any of the four tournaments.

== Men ==
=== Men's singles ===
Games	Gold	Silver	Bronze
1992 Barcelona	Alan Budikusuma; Indonesia	Ardy Wiranata; Indonesia	Thomas Stuer-Lauridsen; Denmark
1992 Barcelona	Alan Budikusuma; Indonesia	Ardy Wiranata; Indonesia	Hermawan Susanto; Indonesia
1996 Atlanta	Poul-Erik Høyer Larsen; Denmark	Dong Jiong; China	Rashid Sidek; Malaysia
2000 Sydney	Ji Xinpeng; China	Hendrawan; Indonesia	Xia Xuanze; China
2004 Athens	Taufik Hidayat; Indonesia	Shon Seung-mo; South Korea	Sony Dwi Kuncoro; Indonesia
2008 Beijing	Lin Dan; China	Lee Chong Wei; Malaysia	Chen Jin; China
2012 London	Lin Dan; China	Lee Chong Wei; Malaysia	Chen Long; China
2016 Rio de Janeiro	Chen Long; China	Lee Chong Wei; Malaysia	Viktor Axelsen; Denmark
2020 Tokyo	Viktor Axelsen; Denmark	Chen Long; China	Anthony Sinisuka Ginting; Indonesia
2024 Paris	Viktor Axelsen; Denmark	Kunlavut Vitidsarn; Thailand	Lee Zii Jia; Malaysia
2028 Los Angeles			

=== Men's doubles ===
Games	Gold	Silver	Bronze
1992 Barcelona	South Korea; Kim Moon-soo; Park Joo-bong	Indonesia; Eddy Hartono; Rudy Gunawan	China; Li Yongbo; Tian Bingyi
1992 Barcelona	South Korea; Kim Moon-soo; Park Joo-bong	Indonesia; Eddy Hartono; Rudy Gunawan	Malaysia; Razif Sidek; Jalani Sidek
1996 Atlanta	Indonesia; Rexy Mainaky; Ricky Subagja	Malaysia; Cheah Soon Kit; Yap Kim Hock	Indonesia; Antonius Ariantho; Denny Kantono
2000 Sydney	Indonesia; Tony Gunawan; Candra Wijaya	South Korea; Lee Dong-soo; Yoo Yong-sung	South Korea; Ha Tae-kwon; Kim Dong-moon
2004 Athens	South Korea; Ha Tae-kwon; Kim Dong-moon	South Korea; Lee Dong-soo; Yoo Yong-sung	Indonesia; Eng Hian; Flandy Limpele
2008 Beijing	Indonesia; Markis Kido; Hendra Setiawan	China; Cai Yun; Fu Haifeng	South Korea; Hwang Ji-man; Lee Jae-jin
2012 London	China; Cai Yun; Fu Haifeng	Denmark; Mathias Boe; Carsten Mogensen	South Korea; Jung Jae-sung; Lee Yong-dae
2016 Rio de Janeiro	China; Zhang Nan; Fu Haifeng	Malaysia; Goh V Shem; Tan Wee Kiong	Great Britain; Chris Langridge; Marcus Ellis
2020 Tokyo	Chinese Taipei; Lee Yang; Wang Chi-lin	China; Li Junhui; Liu Yuchen	Malaysia; Aaron Chia; Soh Wooi Yik
2024 Paris	Chinese Taipei; Lee Yang; Wang Chi-lin	China; Liang Weikeng; Wang Chang	Malaysia; Aaron Chia; Soh Wooi Yik
2028 Los Angeles			

== Women ==
=== Women's singles ===
Games	Gold	Silver	Bronze
1992 Barcelona	Susi Susanti; Indonesia	Bang Soo-hyun; South Korea	Huang Hua; China
1992 Barcelona	Susi Susanti; Indonesia	Bang Soo-hyun; South Korea	Tang Jiuhong; China
1996 Atlanta	Bang Soo-hyun; South Korea	Mia Audina; Indonesia	Susi Susanti; Indonesia
2000 Sydney	Gong Zhichao; China	Camilla Martin; Denmark	Ye Zhaoying; China
2004 Athens	Zhang Ning; China	Mia Audina; Netherlands	Zhou Mi; China
2008 Beijing	Zhang Ning; China	Xie Xingfang; China	Maria Kristin Yulianti; Indonesia
2012 London	Li Xuerui; China	Wang Yihan; China	Saina Nehwal; India
2016 Rio de Janeiro	Carolina Marín; Spain	P. V. Sindhu; India	Nozomi Okuhara; Japan
2020 Tokyo	Chen Yufei; China	Tai Tzu-ying; Chinese Taipei	P. V. Sindhu; India
2024 Paris	An Se-young; South Korea	He Bingjiao; China	Gregoria Mariska Tunjung; Indonesia
2028 Los Angeles			

=== Women's doubles ===
Games	Gold	Silver	Bronze
1992 Barcelona	South Korea; Chung So-young; Hwang Hye-young	China; Guan Weizhen; Nong Qunhua	South Korea; Gil Young-ah; Shim Eun-jung
1992 Barcelona	South Korea; Chung So-young; Hwang Hye-young	China; Guan Weizhen; Nong Qunhua	China; Lin Yanfen; Yao Fen
1996 Atlanta	China; Ge Fei; Gu Jun	South Korea; Gil Young-ah; Jang Hye-ock	China; Qin Yiyuan; Tang Yongshu
2000 Sydney	China; Ge Fei; Gu Jun	China; Huang Nanyan; Yang Wei	China; Gao Ling; Qin Yiyuan
2004 Athens	China; Yang Wei; Zhang Jiewen	China; Gao Ling; Huang Sui	South Korea; Lee Kyung-won; Ra Kyung-min
2008 Beijing	China; Du Jing; Yu Yang	South Korea; Lee Hyo-jung; Lee Kyung-won	China; Wei Yili; Zhang Yawen
2012 London	China; Tian Qing; Zhao Yunlei	Japan; Mizuki Fujii; Reika Kakiiwa	Russia; Valeria Sorokina; Nina Vislova
2016 Rio de Janeiro	Japan; Misaki Matsutomo; Ayaka Takahashi	Denmark; Christinna Pedersen; Kamilla Rytter Juhl	South Korea; Jung Kyung-eun; Shin Seung-chan
2020 Tokyo	Indonesia; Greysia Polii; Apriyani Rahayu	China; Chen Qingchen; Jia Yifan	South Korea; Kim So-yeong; Kong Hee-yong
2024 Paris	China; Chen Qingchen; Jia Yifan	China; Liu Shengshu; Tan Ning	Japan; Nami Matsuyama; Chiharu Shida
2028 Los Angeles			

== Mixed ==
=== Mixed doubles ===
Games	Gold	Silver	Bronze
1996 Atlanta	South Korea; Kim Dong-moon; Gil Young-ah	South Korea; Park Joo-bong; Ra Kyung-min	China; Liu Jianjun; Sun Man
2000 Sydney	China; Zhang Jun; Gao Ling	Indonesia; Tri Kusharjanto; Minarti Timur	Great Britain; Simon Archer; Joanne Goode
2004 Athens	China; Zhang Jun; Gao Ling	Great Britain; Nathan Robertson; Gail Emms	Denmark; Jens Eriksen; Mette Schjoldager
2008 Beijing	South Korea; Lee Yong-dae; Lee Hyo-jung	Indonesia; Nova Widianto; Liliyana Natsir	China; He Hanbin; Yu Yang
2012 London	China; Zhang Nan; Zhao Yunlei	China; Xu Chen; Ma Jin	Denmark; Joachim Fischer Nielsen; Christinna Pedersen
2016 Rio de Janeiro	Indonesia; Tontowi Ahmad; Liliyana Natsir	Malaysia; Chan Peng Soon; Goh Liu Ying	China; Zhang Nan; Zhao Yunlei
2020 Tokyo	China; Wang Yilyu; Huang Dongping	China; Zheng Siwei; Huang Yaqiong	Japan; Yuta Watanabe; Arisa Higashino
2024 Paris	China; Zheng Siwei; Huang Yaqiong	South Korea; Kim Won-ho; Jeong Na-eun	Japan; Yuta Watanabe; Arisa Higashino
2028 Los Angeles			

== Statistics ==
=== Olympic Medal leaders ===
Medalist	Nation	Olympics	Gold	Silver	Bronze	Total
Gao Ling	China	2000–2008	2	1	1	4
Fu Haifeng	China	2004–2016	2	1	0	3
Zhang Nan	China	2012–2016	2	0	1	3
Zhao Yunlei	China	2012–2016	2	0	1	3
Viktor Axelsen	Denmark	2016–2024	2	0	1	3
Kim Dong-moon	South Korea	1996–2004	2	0	1	3
Ge Fei	China	1996–2000	2	0	0	2
Gu Jun	China	1996–2000	2	0	0	2
Lin Dan	China	2004–2016	2	0	0	2
Zhang Jun	China	2000–2004	2	0	0	2
Zhang Ning	China	2004–2008	2	0	0	2
Lee Yang	Chinese Taipei	2020–2024	2	0	0	2
Wang Chi-lin	Chinese Taipei	2020–2024	2	0	0	2
Chen Long	China	2012–2020	1	1	1	3
Gil Young-ah	South Korea	1992–1996	1	1	1	3
Cai Yun	China	2004–2012	1	1	0	2
Chen Qingchen	China	2020–2024	1	1	0	2
Huang Yaqiong	China	2020–2024	1	1	0	2
Jia Yifan	China	2020–2024	1	1	0	2
Yang Wei	China	2000–2008	1	1	0	2
Zheng Siwei	China	2020–2024	1	1	0	2
Liliyana Natsir	Indonesia	2008–2016	1	1	0	2
Bang Soo-hyun	South Korea	1992–1996	1	1	0	2
Park Joo-bong	South Korea	1992–1996	1	1	0	2
Lee Hyo-jung	South Korea	2000–2008	1	1	0	2
Yu Yang	China	2008–2016	1	0	1	2
Susi Susanti	Indonesia	1992–1996	1	0	1	2
Ha Tae-kwon	South Korea	1996–2004	1	0	1	2
Lee Yong-dae	South Korea	2008–2016	1	0	1	2
Ji Xinpeng	China	2000	1	0	0	1
Gong Zhichao	China	2000	1	0	0	1
Zhang Jiewen	China	2004–2008	1	0	0	1
Du Jing	China	2008	1	0	0	1
Tian Qing	China	2012	1	0	0	1
Li Xuerui	China	2012–2016	1	0	0	1
Chen Yufei	China	2020–2024	1	0	0	1
Huang Dongping	China	2020–2024	1	0	0	1
Wang Yilyu	China	2020	1	0	0	1
Poul-Erik Høyer Larsen	Denmark	1992–2000	1	0	0	1
Alan Budikusuma	Indonesia	1992–1996	1	0	0	1
Ricky Subagja	Indonesia	1992–2000	1	0	0	1
Rexy Mainaky	Indonesia	1992–2000	1	0	0	1
Candra Wijaya	Indonesia	2000	1	0	0	1
Tony Gunawan	Indonesia; United States	2000, 2012	1	0	0	1
Taufik Hidayat	Indonesia	2000–2012	1	0	0	1
Markis Kido	Indonesia	2008	1	0	0	1
Hendra Setiawan	Indonesia	2008, 2016–2020	1	0	0	1
Tontowi Ahmad	Indonesia	2012–2016	1	0	0	1
Greysia Polii	Indonesia	2012–2020	1	0	0	1
Apriyani Rahayu	Indonesia	2020–2024	1	0	0	1
Misaki Matsutomo	Japan	2016	1	0	0	1
Ayaka Takahashi	Japan	2016	1	0	0	1
An Se-young	South Korea	2020–2024	1	0	0	1
Chung So-young	South Korea	1992	1	0	0	1
Hwang Hye-young	South Korea	1992	1	0	0	1
Kim Moon-soo	South Korea	1992–1996	1	0	0	1
Carolina Marín	Spain	2012–2016, 2024	1	0	0	1
Lee Chong Wei	Malaysia	2004–2016	0	3	0	3
Mia Audina	Indonesia; Netherlands	1996–2004	0	2	0	2
Yoo Yong-sung	South Korea	1996–2004	0	2	0	2
Lee Dong-soo	South Korea	2000–2004	0	2	0	2
Christinna Pedersen	Denmark	2012–2016	0	1	1	2
P. V. Sindhu	India	2016–2024	0	1	1	2
Ra Kyung-min	South Korea	1996–2004	0	1	1	2
Lee Kyung-won	South Korea	2000–2008	0	1	1	2
Guan Weizhen	China	1992	0	1	0	1
Nong Qunhua	China	1992	0	1	0	1
Dong Jiong	China	1996	0	1	0	1
He Bingjiao	China	2020–2024	0	1	0	1
Huang Nanyan	China	2000	0	1	0	1
Huang Sui	China	2004	0	1	0	1
Xie Xingfang	China	2008	0	1	0	1
Wang Yihan	China	2012–2016	0	1	0	1
Li Junhui	China	2020	0	1	0	1
Liu Yuchen	China	2020–2024	0	1	0	1
Liang Weikeng	China	2024	0	1	0	1
Liu Shengshu	China	2024	0	1	0	1
Tan Ning	China	2024	0	1	0	1
Wang Chang	China	2024	0	1	0	1
Tai Tzu-ying	Chinese Taipei	2012-2024	0	1	0	1
Camilla Martin	Denmark	1992–2004	0	1	0	1
Mathias Boe	Denmark	2012–2016	0	1	0	1
Carsten Mogensen	Denmark	2012–2016	0	1	0	1
Kamilla Rytter Juhl	Denmark	2008–2016	0	1	0	1
Nathan Robertson	Great Britain	2000–2008	0	1	0	1
Gail Emms	Great Britain	2004–2008	0	1	0	1
Ardy Wiranata	Indonesia	1992	0	1	0	1
Eddy Hartono	Indonesia	1992	0	1	0	1
Rudy Gunawan	Indonesia	1992–1996	0	1	0	1
Tri Kusharjanto	Indonesia	1996–2004	0	1	0	1
Minarti Timur	Indonesia	1996–2000	0	1	0	1
Hendrawan	Indonesia	2000	0	1	0	1
Nova Widianto	Indonesia	2004–2008	0	1	0	1
Mizuki Fujii	Japan	2012	0	1	0	1
Reika Kakiiwa	Japan	2012	0	1	0	1
Cheah Soon Kit	Malaysia	1992–2000	0	1	0	1
Yap Kim Hock	Malaysia	1996–2000	0	1	0	1
Chan Peng Soon	Malaysia	2012–2020	0	1	0	1
Goh Liu Ying	Malaysia	2012–2020	0	1	0	1
Goh V Shem	Malaysia	2016	0	1	0	1
Tan Wee Kiong	Malaysia	2016	0	1	0	1
Jang Hye-ock	South Korea	1996	0	1	0	1
Jeong Na-eun	South Korea	2024	0	1	0	1
Kim Won-ho	South Korea	2024	0	1	0	1
Shon Seung-mo	South Korea	2000–2004	0	1	0	1
Kunlavut Vitidsarn	Thailand	2024	0	1	0	1
Qin Yiyuan	China	1996–2000	0	0	2	2
Arisa Higashino	Japan	2020–2024	0	0	2	2
Yuta Watanabe	Japan	2020–2024	0	0	2	2
Aaron Chia	Malaysia	2020–2024	0	0	2	2
Soh Wooi Yik	Malaysia	2020–2024	0	0	2	2
Huang Hua	China	1992	0	0	1	1
Tang Jiuhong	China	1992	0	0	1	1
Li Yongbo	China	1992	0	0	1	1
Tian Bingyi	China	1992	0	0	1	1
Lin Yanfen	China	1992	0	0	1	1
Yao Fen	China	1992	0	0	1	1
Tang Yongshu	China	1996	0	0	1	1
Liu Jianjun	China	1996	0	0	1	1
Sun Man	China	1996	0	0	1	1
Ye Zhaoying	China	1996–2000	0	0	1	1
Xia Xuanze	China	2000	0	0	1	1
Zhou Mi	China	2004	0	0	1	1
Wei Yili	China	2004–2008	0	0	1	1
Zhang Yawen	China	2008	0	0	1	1
Chen Jin	China	2008–2012	0	0	1	1
He Hanbin	China	2008	0	0	1	1
Xu Chen	China	2012–2016	0	0	1	1
Ma Jin	China	2012–2016	0	0	1	1
Thomas Stuer-Lauridsen	Denmark	1992–1996	0	0	1	1
Jens Eriksen	Denmark	1996–2008	0	0	1	1
Mette Schjoldager	Denmark	2000–2004	0	0	1	1
Joachim Fischer Nielsen	Denmark	2012–2016	0	0	1	1
Simon Archer	Great Britain	1996–2000	0	0	1	1
Joanne Goode	Great Britain	1996–2000	0	0	1	1
Marcus Ellis	Great Britain	2016	0	0	1	1
Chris Langridge	Great Britain	2016	0	0	1	1
Saina Nehwal	India	2008–2016	0	0	1	1
Hermawan Susanto	Indonesia	1992	0	0	1	1
Antonius Ariantho	Indonesia	1996	0	0	1	1
Denny Kantono	Indonesia	1996	0	0	1	1
Flandy Limpele	Indonesia	1996–2008	0	0	1	1
Eng Hian	Indonesia	2000–2004	0	0	1	1
Sony Dwi Kuncoro	Indonesia	2004–2008	0	0	1	1
Maria Kristin Yulianti	Indonesia	2008	0	0	1	1
Anthony Sinisuka Ginting	Indonesia	2020–2024	0	0	1	1
Gregoria Mariska Tunjung	Indonesia	2020–2024	0	0	1	1
Nami Matsuyama	Japan	2024	0	0	1	1
Nozomi Okuhara	Japan	2016–2020	0	0	1	1
Chiharu Shida	Japan	2024	0	0	1	1
Lee Zii Jia	Malaysia	2020–2024	0	0	1	1
Razif Sidek	Malaysia	1992	0	0	1	1
Jalani Sidek	Malaysia	1992	0	0	1	1
Rashid Sidek	Malaysia	1992–1996	0	0	1	1
Valeria Sorokina	Russia	2012	0	0	1	1
Nina Vislova	Russia	2012	0	0	1	1
Shim Eun-jung	South Korea	1992	0	0	1	1
Hwang Ji-man	South Korea	2008	0	0	1	1
Lee Jae-jin	South Korea	2008	0	0	1	1
Jung Jae-sung	South Korea	2008–2012	0	0	1	1
Jung Kyung-eun	South Korea	2012–2016	0	0	1	1
Shin Seung-chan	South Korea	2016–2020	0	0	1	1
Kim So-yeong	South Korea	2020–2024	0	0	1	1
Kong Hee-yong	South Korea	2020–2024	0	0	1	1

== Medal table ==
As of the 2024 Olympics

Rank	Nation	Gold	Silver	Bronze	Total
1	China	22	15	15	52
2	Indonesia	8	6	8	22
3	South Korea	7	8	7	22
4	Denmark	3	3	4	10
5	Chinese Taipei	2	1	0	3
6	Japan	1	1	4	6
7	Spain	1	0	0	1
8	Malaysia	0	6	5	11
9	Great Britain	0	1	2	3
9	India	0	1	2	3
11	Netherlands	0	1	0	1
11	Thailand	0	1	0	1
13	Russia	0	0	1	1
Totals (13 entries)		44	44	48	136

== Medal distribution ==
As of the 2024 Olympics

=== Men's singles ===
Rank	Nation	Gold	Silver	Bronze	Total
1	China	4	2	3	9
2	Denmark	3	0	2	5
3	Indonesia	2	2	3	7
4	Malaysia	0	3	2	5
5	South Korea	0	1	0	1
5	Thailand	0	1	0	1
Totals (6 entries)		9	9	10	28

=== Men's doubles ===
Rank	Nation	Gold	Silver	Bronze	Total
1	Indonesia	3	1	2	6
2	China	2	3	1	6
3	South Korea	2	2	3	7
4	Chinese Taipei	2	0	0	2
5	Malaysia	0	2	3	5
6	Denmark	0	1	0	1
7	Great Britain	0	0	1	1
Totals (7 entries)		9	9	10	28

=== Women's singles ===
Rank	Nation	Gold	Silver	Bronze	Total
1	China	5	3	4	12
2	South Korea	2	1	0	3
3	Indonesia	1	1	3	5
4	Spain	1	0	0	1
5	India	0	1	2	3
6	Chinese Taipei	0	1	0	1
6	Denmark	0	1	0	1
6	Netherlands	0	1	0	1
9	Japan	0	0	1	1
Totals (9 entries)		9	9	10	28

=== Women's doubles ===
Rank	Nation	Gold	Silver	Bronze	Total
1	China	6	5	4	15
2	South Korea	1	2	4	7
3	Japan	1	1	1	3
4	Indonesia	1	0	0	1
5	Denmark	0	1	0	1
6	Russia	0	0	1	1
Totals (6 entries)		9	9	10	28

=== Mixed doubles ===
Rank	Nation	Gold	Silver	Bronze	Total
1	China	5	2	3	10
2	South Korea	2	2	0	4
3	Indonesia	1	2	0	3
4	Great Britain	0	1	1	2
5	Malaysia	0	1	0	1
6	Denmark	0	0	2	2
6	Japan	0	0	2	2
Totals (7 entries)		8	8	8	24

== Medals per year ==
As of the 2024 Olympics

Nation	72; 88	92	96	00	04	08	12	16	20	24	28	Total
China		5	4	8	5	8	8	3	6	5		52
Indonesia		5	4	3	3	3	–	1	2	1		22
South Korea		4	4	2	4	3	1	1	1	2		22
Malaysia		1	2	–	–	1	1	3	1	2		11
Denmark		1	1	1	1	–	2	2	1	1		10
Japan		–	–	–	–	–	1	2	1	2		6
Great Britain		–	–	1	1	–	–	1	–	–		3
India		–	–	–	–	–	1	1	1	–		3
Chinese Taipei		–	–	–	–	–	–	–	2	1		3
Netherlands		–	–	–	1	–	–	–	–	–		1
Russia		–	–	–	–	–	1	–	–	–		1
Spain		–	–	–	–	–	–	1	–	–		1
Thailand		–	–	–	–	–	–	–	–	1		1
Total		16	15	15	15	15	15	15	15	15		136

== See also ==
- BWF World Championships
