= Lee Wan Wah =

Malaysian badminton player

Lee Wan Wah 李万华
Personal information
- Born: 24 November 1975 (age 50) Ipoh, Perak, Malaysia
- Years active: 1994–2011
- Height: 1.83 m (6 ft 0 in)
- Weight: 85 kg (187 lb)

Sport
- Country: Malaysia
- Sport: Badminton
- Handedness: Right

Men's doubles
- Career title: 12
- Highest ranking: 1 (2004)
- BWF profile
Medal record
Representing Malaysia
Men's badminton
World Championships
Bronze medal – third place	2001 Seville	Men's doubles
Bronze medal – third place	2007 Kuala Lumpur	Men's doubles
World Cup
Bronze medal – third place	1997 Yogyakarta	Men's doubles
Thomas Cup
Silver medal – second place	1998 Hong Kong	Team
Silver medal – second place	2002 Guangzhou	Team
Bronze medal – third place	2006 Sendai/Tokyo	Team
Bronze medal – third place	2008 Jakarta	Team
Commonwealth Games
Gold medal – first place	1998 Kuala Lumpur	Men's doubles
Gold medal – first place	1998 Kuala Lumpur	Men's team
Asian Championships
Gold medal – first place	2006 Johor Bahru	Men's doubles
Gold medal – first place	2007 Johor Bahru	Men's doubles
Silver medal – second place	1997 Kuala Lumpur	Men's doubles
Silver medal – second place	2000 Jakarta	Men's doubles
Asia Cup
Silver medal – second place	1997 Jakarta	Men's team
SEA Games
Gold medal – first place	2001 Kuala Lumpur	Men's team
Gold medal – first place	2003 Ho Chi Minh	Men's doubles
Gold medal – first place	2005 Manila	Men's team
Silver medal – second place	1999 Bandar Seri Begawan	Men's team
Bronze medal – third place	1999 Bandar Seri Begawan	Men's doubles
Bronze medal – third place	2001 Kuala Lumpur	Men's doubles
Bronze medal – third place	2003 Ho Chi Minh	Men's team

Lee Wan Wah
- Traditional Chinese: 李萬華
- Simplified Chinese: 李万华
Transcriptions
Standard Mandarin
- Hanyu Pinyin: Liwànhuá
Yue: Cantonese
- Jyutping: Lei5 Maan6 Waa6
Southern Min
- Hokkien POJ: Lí Bān-hôa

Lee Wan Wah AMN (Chinese: 李萬華; Chinese: 李万华; Pe̍h-ōe-jī: Lí Bān-hôa, born 24 November 1975) is a former badminton player from Malaysia. He is currently the Japan junior team coach.

== Career overview ==
Lee made his debut in Olympic Games in 2000 Sydney. Partnered with Choong Tan Fook, they advanced to the semi-finals stage, but lost to South Korean pair Lee Dong-soo and Yoo Yong-sung in the rubber game. The duo played in the bronze medal match against another South Korean duo Ha Tae-kwon and Kim Dong-moon, but lost in straight game with the score 2–15, 8–15.

In 2004 Athens, Lee and Choong had a bye in the first round and defeated Pramote Teerawiwatana and Tesana Panvisvas of Thailand in the second. In the quarterfinals, they lost 11–15, 15–11, 15–9 to Lee Dong-soo and Yoo Yong-sung of South Korea.

In 2008, Lee participated in Jakarta for the Malaysian Thomas Cup team, being Choong's partner. Lee could not compete in the semi-final, because Choong was sick. Consequently, Malaysia was beaten by the defending champion China.

At the Beijing Olympic Games, Lee and Choong, seeded four, surprisingly lost to South Korean Lee Jae-jin and Hwang Ji-man, who captured the bronze medal.

In November 2009, Lee and Choong reached Hong Kong Open Super Series semi-final but they lost to Denmark's Lars Paaske and Jonas Rasmussen.

== Coaching ==
In October 2008, Lee left Badminton Association of Malaysia (BAM) and established a company, Pioneer Sdn Bhd, with fellow badminton players Wong Choong Hann, Chan Chong Ming, and Chew Choon Eng, to coach young badminton players in Kota Damansara and Bandar Mahkota Cheras. They hoped that the company will turn into academies for local and international players.

In 2015, Lee Wan Wah started coaching professionals Koo Kien Keat and Tan Boon Heong. Koo and Tan went to look for Lee to be their coach since they Koo and Tan left the national set up. They have a successful partnership under Lee, and Koo and Tan are doing well in tournaments.

== Achievements ==
=== World Championships ===
Men's doubles
Year	Venue	Partner	Opponent	Score	Result
2001	Palacio de Deportes de San Pablo, Seville, Spain	(Malaysia) Choong Tan Fook	(South Korea) Ha Tae-kwon (South Korea) Kim Dong-moon	7–15, 15–9, 10–15	Bronze
2007	Putra Indoor Stadium, Kuala Lumpur, Malaysia	(Malaysia) Choong Tan Fook	(Indonesia) Markis Kido (Indonesia) Hendra Setiawan	20–22, 26–28	Bronze

=== World Cup ===
Men's doubles
Year	Venue	Partner	Opponent	Score	Result
1997	Among Rogo Sports Hall, Yogyakarta, Indonesia	(Malaysia) Choong Tan Fook	(Indonesia) Rexy Mainaky (Indonesia) Ricky Subagja	12–15, 3–15	Bronze

=== Commonwealth Games ===
Men's doubles
Year	Venue	Partner	Opponent	Score	Result
1998	Kuala Lumpur Badminton Stadium, Kuala Lumpur, Malaysia	(Malaysia) Choong Tan Fook	(Malaysia) Cheah Soon Kit (Malaysia) Yap Kim Hock	15–7, 15–4	Gold

=== Asian Championships ===
Year	Venue	Partner	Opponent	Score	Result
1997	Stadium Negara, Kuala Lumpur, Malaysia	(Malaysia) Choong Tan Fook	(Indonesia) Antonius Ariantho (Indonesia) Denny Kantono	15–4, 9–15, 7–15	Silver
2000	Istora Gelora Bung Karno, Jakarta, Indonesia	(Malaysia) Choong Tan Fook	(Indonesia) Tony Gunawan (Indonesia) Rexy Mainaky	8–15, 9–15	Silver
2006	Bandaraya Stadium, Johor Bahru, Malaysia	(Malaysia) Choong Tan Fook	(Malaysia) Hoon Thien How (Malaysia) Tan Boon Heong	17–21, 21–11, 21–12	Gold
2007	Bandaraya Stadium, Johor Bahru, Malaysia	(Malaysia) Choong Tan Fook	(Malaysia) Koo Kien Keat (Malaysia) Tan Boon Heong	21–14, 11–21, 21–12	Gold

=== SEA Games ===
Men's doubles
Year	Venue	Partner	Opponent	Score	Result
1999	Hassanal Bolkiah Sports Complex, Bandar Seri Begawan, Brunei	(Malaysia) Choong Tan Fook	(Thailand) Tesana Panvisvas (Thailand) Pramote Teerawiwatana	15–12, 10–15, 12–15	Bronze
2001	Malawati Stadium, Selangor, Malaysia	(Malaysia) Wong Choong Hann	(Indonesia) Sigit Budiarto (Indonesia) Candra Wijaya	4–15, 5–15	Bronze
2003	Tan Binh Sport Center, Ho Chi Minh City, Vietnam	(Malaysia) Choong Tan Fook	(Malaysia) Chang Kim Wai (Malaysia) Chew Choon Eng	15–5, 15–6	Gold

=== BWF Superseries and Grand Prix ===
Men's doubles
Year	Tournament	Partner	Opponent	Score	Result
1996	Malaysia Open	(Malaysia) Choong Tan Fook	(Malaysia) Cheah Soon Kit (Malaysia) Yap Kim Hock	5–15, 3–15	(silver) Runner-up
1996	Vietnam Open	(Malaysia) Choong Tan Fook	(China) Liu Yong (China) Zhang Wei	15–6, 15–6	(gold) Winner
1999	Singapore Open	(Malaysia) Choong Tan Fook	(Indonesia) Tony Gunawan (Indonesia) Candra Wijaya	15–7, 14–15, 15–12	(gold) Winner
1999	Dutch Open	(Malaysia) Choong Tan Fook	(Denmark) Martin Lundgaard Hansen (Denmark) Lars Paaske	15–4, 6–15, 15–9	(gold) Winner
1999	German Open	(Malaysia) Choong Tan Fook	(Sweden) Peter Axelsson (Sweden) Pär-Gunnar Jönsson	15–9, 15–6	(gold) Winner
2002	Japan Open	(Malaysia) Choong Tan Fook	(Malaysia) Chan Chong Ming (Malaysia) Chew Choon Eng	Walkover	(silver) Runner-up
2003	Hong Kong Open	(Malaysia) Choong Tan Fook	(South Korea) Lee Dong-soo (South Korea) Yoo Yong-sung	13–15, 15–6, 6–15	(silver) Runner-up
2003	China Open	(Malaysia) Choong Tan Fook	(Denmark) Lars Paaske (Denmark) Jonas Rasmussen	12–15, 10–15	(silver) Runner-up
2004	All England Open	(Malaysia) Choong Tan Fook	(Denmark) Jens Eriksen (Denmark) Martin Lundgaard Hansen	15–9, 13–15, 3–15	(silver) Runner-up
2004	Malaysia Open	(Malaysia) Choong Tan Fook	(Indonesia) Luluk Hadiyanto (Indonesia) Alvent Yulianto	15–12, 15–7	(gold) Winner
2005	China Masters	(Malaysia) Choong Tan Fook	(China) Guo Zhendong (China) Xie Zhongbo	10–15, 4–15	(silver) Runner-up
2005	Dutch Open	(Malaysia) Choong Tan Fook	(Japan) Keita Masuda (Japan) Tadashi Ōtsuka	15–7, 15–4	(gold) Winner
2006	All England Open	(Malaysia) Choong Tan Fook	(Denmark) Jens Eriksen (Denmark) Martin Lundgaard Hansen	6–15, 17–14, 2–15	(silver) Runner-up
2006	Hong Kong Open	(Malaysia) Choong Tan Fook	(Indonesia) Markis Kido (Indonesia) Hendra Setiawan	24–22, 16–21, 20–22	(silver) Runner-up
2007	Singapore Open	(Malaysia) Choong Tan Fook	(China) Cai Yun (China) Fu Haifeng	21–16, 22–24, 18–21	(silver) Runner-up
2007	Macau Open	(Malaysia) Choong Tan Fook	(Malaysia) Koo Kien Keat (Malaysia) Tan Boon Heong	18–21, 21–17, 21–23	(silver) Runner-up
2007	French Open	(Malaysia) Choong Tan Fook	(China) Cai Yun (China) Fu Haifeng	14–21, 19–21	(silver) Runner-up
2008	Vietnam Open	(Malaysia) Choong Tan Fook	(Indonesia) Fran Kurniawan (Indonesia) Rendra Wijaya	21–14, 21–10	(gold) Winner
2009	India Open	(Malaysia) Choong Tan Fook	(Indonesia) Hendri Kurniawan Saputra (Indonesia) Hendra Wijaya	21–9, 21–11	(gold) Winner
2009	Thailand Open	(Malaysia) Choong Tan Fook	(Malaysia) Chan Peng Soon (Malaysia) Lim Khim Wah	22–20, 14–21, 11–21	(silver) Runner-up
2009	Macau Open	(Malaysia) Choong Tan Fook	(Malaysia) Koo Kien Keat (Malaysia) Tan Boon Heong	14–21, 21–17, 12–21	(silver) Runner-up

BWF Superseries tournament
Grand Prix Gold tournament
Grand Prix tournament
IBF World Grand Prix tournament

== Honour ==
- Member of the Order of the Defender of the Realm (A.M.N.) (2000).
