= 1996 Badminton World Cup =

Badminton championships

Tournament details
- Dates: 11–15 December 1996
- Edition: 18th
- Total prize money: US$185,000
- Venue: Istora Senayan
- Location: Jakarta, Indonesia

The 1996 Badminton World Cup was the eighteenth edition of an international tournament Badminton World Cup. The event was held at the Istora Senayan in Jakarta, Indonesia from 11 to 15 December 1996 with a total prize money of US$185,000. Indonesia won 3 titles, while China finished with the titles in 2 disciplines.

== Medalists ==
Event	Gold	Silver	Bronze
Men's singles	(China) Dong Jiong	(Indonesia) Jeffer Rosobin	(South Korea) Park Sung-woo
Men's singles	(China) Dong Jiong	(Indonesia) Jeffer Rosobin	(England) Darren Hall
Women's singles	(Indonesia) Susi Susanti	(China) Wang Chen	(Indonesia) Mia Audina
Women's singles	(Indonesia) Susi Susanti	(China) Wang Chen	(China) Ye Zhaoying
Men's doubles	(Indonesia) Antonius Ariantho (Indonesia) Denny Kantono	(Indonesia) Sigit Budiarto (Indonesia) Rexy Mainaky	(Malaysia) Cheah Soon Kit (Malaysia) Yap Kim Hock
Men's doubles	(Indonesia) Antonius Ariantho (Indonesia) Denny Kantono	(Indonesia) Sigit Budiarto (Indonesia) Rexy Mainaky	(Russia) Andrey Antropov (Russia) Nikolai Zuyey
Women's doubles	(China) Ge Fei (China) Gu Jun	(China) Qin Yiyuan (China) Tang Yongshu	(South Korea) Kim Mee-hyang (South Korea) Kim Shin-young
Women's doubles	(China) Ge Fei (China) Gu Jun	(China) Qin Yiyuan (China) Tang Yongshu	(Indonesia) Eliza Nathanael (Indonesia) Zelin Resiana
Mixed doubles	(Indonesia) Sandiarto (Indonesia) Minarti Timur	(Indonesia) Flandy Limpele (Indonesia) Rosalina Riseu	(Denmark) Michael Søgaard (Denmark) Rikke Olsen
Mixed doubles	(Indonesia) Sandiarto (Indonesia) Minarti Timur	(Indonesia) Flandy Limpele (Indonesia) Rosalina Riseu	(China) Chen Xingdong (China) Peng Xingyong

== Men's singles ==
=== Finals ===
Semi-finals
(China) Dong Jiong	17	15
(South Korea) Park Sung-woo	14	2
(Indonesia) Jeffer Rosobin	9	17	15
(England) Darren Hall	15	14	12

Final
(China) Dong Jiong	15	15
(Indonesia) Jeffer Rosobin	5	8

== Women's singles ==
=== Finals ===
Semi-finals
(China) Wang Chen	11	3	11
(Indonesia) Mia Audina	9	11	7
(China) Ye Zhaoying	2	11	2
(Indonesia) Susi Susanti	11	9	11

Final
(China) Wang Chen	7	4
(Indonesia) Susi Susanti	11	11

== Men's doubles ==
=== Finals ===
Semi-finals
(Indonesia) Antonius Ariantho (Indonesia) Denny Kantono	15	3	15
(Malaysia) Cheah Soon Kit (Malaysia) Yap Kim Hock	11	15	13
(Indonesia) Sigit Budiarto (Indonesia) Rexy Mainaky	9	15	15
(Russia) Andrey Antropov (Russia) Nikolai Zuyey	15	3	3

Final
(Indonesia) Antonius Ariantho (Indonesia) Denny Kantono	15	15
(Indonesia) Sigit Budiarto (Indonesia) Rexy Mainaky	8	2

== Women's doubles ==
=== Finals ===
Semi-finals
(China) Ge Fei (China) Gu Jun	15	15
(South Korea) Kim Mee-hyang (South Korea) Kim Shin-young	2	4
(China) Qin Yiyuan (China) Tang Yongshu	15	15
(Indonesia) Eliza Nathanael (Indonesia) Zelin Resiana	9	4

Final
(China) Ge Fei (China) Gu Jun	15	15
(China) Qin Yiyuan (China) Tang Yongshu	6	12

== Mixed doubles ==
=== Finals ===
Semi-finals
(Indonesia) Sandiarto (Indonesia) Minarti Timur	15	13	15
(Denmark) Michael Søgaard (Denmark) Rikke Olsen	6	15	8
(Indonesia) Flandy Limpele (Indonesia) Rosalina Riseu	15	15
(China) Chen Xingdong (China) Peng Xingyong	9	13

Final
(Indonesia) Sandiarto (Indonesia) Minarti Timur	17	15
(Indonesia) Flandy Limpele (Indonesia) Rosalina Riseu	14	7
