= Sandiarto =

Indonesian badminton player

Personal information
- Born: Sandiarto Liauw; 26 November 1973 (age 52)
- Height: 1.80 m (5 ft 11 in)

Sport
- Country: Indonesia
- Sport: Badminton
- Handedness: Right
- BWF profile
Medal record
Men's badminton
Representing Indonesia
World Cup
Gold medal – first place	1996 Jakarta	Mixed doubles
Asian Championships
Bronze medal – third place	1997 Kuala Lumpur	Mixed doubles
Bronze medal – third place	1995 Beijing	Mixed doubles
Bronze medal – third place	1994 Shanghai	Mixed doubles
Asian Cup
Bronze medal – third place	1996 Seoul	Mixed doubles

Sandiarto Liauw (born 26 November 1973) is a retired badminton player from Indonesia who specialized in doubles events. Started his career in Rejomulyo club in Semarang, Liauw was a champion at the 1996 World Cup in the mixed doubles event partnered with Minarti Timur.

Throughout his career, Liauw clinched the mixed doubles titles at the 1996 Brunei and 1997 Chinese Taipei Opens. He also collected three bronze medals at the Asian Championships in 1994, 1995 and 1997.

After retired from the international tournament, Liauw started a new career as a coach, and had been the Indonesia national women's singles coach until the end of 2006. He then moved to Canada and works as a coach in ClearOne Badminton in Richmond, British Columbia.

== Achievements ==
=== World Cup ===
Mixed doubles
Year	Venue	Partner	Opponent	Score	Result
1996	Istora Senayan; Jakarta, Indonesia	(Indonesia) Minarti Timur	(Indonesia) Flandy Limpele (Indonesia) Rosalina Riseu	17–14, 15–7	Gold

=== Asian Championships ===
Mixed doubles
Year	Venue	Partner	Opponent	Score	Result
1997	Kuala Lumpur, Malaysia	(Indonesia) Finarsih	(China) Zhang Jun (China) Liu Lu	3–15, 15–2, 4–15	Bronze
1995	Beijing, China	(Indonesia) Sri Untari	(China) Jiang Xin (China) Zhang Jin	17–14, 2–15, 2–15	Bronze
1994	Shanghai Gymnasium; Shanghai, China	(Indonesia) Sri Untari	(China) Chen Xingdong (China) Sun Man	9–15, 9–15	Bronze

=== Asian Cup ===
Mixed doubles
Year	Venue	Partner	Opponent	Score	Result
1996	Olympic Gymnasium No. 2 Seoul, South Korea	(Indonesia) Indarti Issolina	(South Korea) Kang Kyung-jin (South Korea) Kim Mee-hyang	12–15, 11–15	Bronze

=== IBF World Grand Prix ===
The World Badminton Grand Prix sanctioned by International Badminton Federation (IBF) since 1983.

Mixed doubles
Year	Tournament	Partner	Opponent	Score	Result
1997	Chinese Taipei Open	(Indonesia) Finarsih	(South Korea) Lee Dong-soo (South Korea) Park Soo-yun	15–11, 15–8	(gold) Winner
1996	Vietnam Open	(Indonesia) Finarsih	(China) Liu Yong (China) Zhang Jin	5–15, 6–15	(silver) Runner-up
1996	Brunei Open	(Indonesia) Vera Octavia	(China) Yang Ming (China) Zhou Mi	18–13, 15–2	(gold) Winner

IBF Grand Prix tournament
IBF Grand Prix Finals tournament
