= Badminton at the 1996 Summer Olympics – Men's doubles =

Badminton at the Olympics

Men's doubles at the Games of the XXVI Olympiad
- Venue: Georgia State University Gymnasium
- Date: 25 July – 1 August 1996
- Competitors: 25 pairs from 14 nations

Medalists
1st place, gold medalist(s)		Rexy Mainaky; Ricky Subagja	Indonesia
2nd place, silver medalist(s)		Cheah Soon Kit; Yap Kim Hock	Malaysia
3rd place, bronze medalist(s)		Antonius Ariantho; Denny Kantono	Indonesia

Men’s doubles badminton event at the 1996 Summer Olympics was held from 25 July to 1 August 1996. The tournament was single-elimination. Matches consisted of three sets, with sets being to 15 for men's doubles. The tournament was held at the Georgia State University Gymnasium.

== Seeds ==
1. Rexy Mainaky / Ricky Subagja (INA) (gold medalists)
2. Cheah Soon Kit / Yap Kim Hock (MAS) (silver medalists)
3. Rudy Gunawan / Bambang Suprianto (INA) (second round)
4. Antonius Ariantho / Denny Kantono (INA) (bronze medalists)

== Results ==
=== Finals ===
Semifinals
1	(Indonesia) Rexy Mainaky (Indonesia) Ricky Subagja	15	15
(Malaysia) Soo Beng Kiang (Malaysia) Tan Kim Her	3	5
4	(Indonesia) Antonius Ariantho (Indonesia) Denny Kantono	10	4
2	(Malaysia) Cheah Soon Kit (Malaysia) Yap Kim Hock	15	15

Final
1	(Indonesia) Rexy Mainaky (Indonesia) Ricky Subagja	5	15	15
2	(Malaysia) Cheah Soon Kit (Malaysia) Yap Kim Hock	15	13	12
Bronze medal match
4	(Indonesia) Antonius Ariantho (Indonesia) Denny Kantono	15	12	15
(Malaysia) Soo Beng Kiang (Malaysia) Tan Kim Her	4	15	8

=== Top half ===
First round
1	(Indonesia) Rexy Mainaky (Indonesia) Ricky Subagja
bye
(Denmark) Michael Søgaard (Denmark) Henrik Svarrer	15	12	18
(South Korea) Kim Dong-moon (South Korea) Yoo Yong-sung	11	15	15
(China) Huang Zhangzhong (China) Jiang Xin
bye
(Mauritius) Stephan Beehary (Mauritius) Eddy Clarisse	3	5
(Australia) Peter Blackburn (Australia) Paul Staight	15	15
3	(Indonesia) Rudy Gunawan (Indonesia) Bambang Suprianto
bye
(Canada) Anil Kaul (Canada) Iain Sydie	7	3
(Malaysia) Soo Beng Kiang (Malaysia) Tan Kim Her	15	15
(Thailand) Pramote Teerawiwatana (Thailand) Sakrapee Thongsari
bye
(United Kingdom) Simon Archer (United Kingdom) Chris Hunt	15	15
(Hong Kong) Chan Siu Kwong (Hong Kong) Tim He	11	12

Second round
1	(Indonesia) Rexy Mainaky (Indonesia) Ricky Subagja	15	15
(Denmark) Michael Søgaard (Denmark) Henrik Svarrer	10	7
(China) Huang Zhangzhong (China) Jiang Xin	15	15
(Australia) Peter Blackburn (Australia) Paul Straight	7	9
3	(Indonesia) Rudy Gunawan (Indonesia) Bambang Suprianto	13	15	6
(Malaysia) Soo Beng Kiang (Malaysia) Tan Kim Her	18	4	15
(Thailand) Pramote Teerawiwatana (Thailand) Sakrapee Thongsari	14	11
(United Kingdom) Simon Archer (United Kingdom) Chris Hunt	18	15

Quarterfinals
1	(Indonesia) Rexy Mainaky (Indonesia) Ricky Subagja	15	15
(China) Huang Zhangzhong (China) Jiang Xin	7	7
(Malaysia) Soo Beng Kiang (Malaysia) Tan Kim Her	15	15
(United Kingdom) Simon Archer (United Kingdom) Chris Hunt	5	12

Semifinals
1	(Indonesia) Rexy Mainaky (Indonesia) Ricky Subagja	15	15
(Malaysia) Soo Beng Kiang (Malaysia) Tan Kim Her	3	5

=== Bottom half ===
First round
(United Kingdom) Nick Ponting (United Kingdom) Julian Robertson	13	15	4
(Russia) Andrey Antropov (Russia) Nikolai Zuyev	18	7	15
(Germany) Michael Helber (Germany) Michael Keck	15	15
(Sweden) Peter Axelsson (Sweden) Pär-Gunnar Jönsson	8	13
(Canada) Jaimie Dawson (Canada) Darryl Yung	10	14
(Denmark) Jens Eriksen (Denmark) Christian Jakobsen	15	17
bye
4	(Indonesia) Antonius Ariantho (Indonesia) Denny Kantono
(South Korea) Ha Tae-kwon (South Korea) Kang Kyung-jin	15	15
(Thailand) Siripong Siripul (Thailand) Khunakorn Sudhisodhi	9	5
bye
(Denmark) Jon Holst-Christensen (Denmark) Thomas Lund
(United Kingdom) Darren Hall (United Kingdom) Peter Knowles	2	3
(China) Ge Cheng (China) Tao Xiaoqiang	15	15
bye
2	(Malaysia) Cheah Soon Kit (Malaysia) Yap Kim Hock

Second round
(Russia) Andrey Antropov (Russia) Nikolai Zuyev	15	15
(Germany) Michael Helber (Germany) Michael Keck	1	7
(Denmark) Jens Eriksen (Denmark) Christian Jakobsen	8	12
4	(Indonesia) Antonius Ariantho (Indonesia) Denny Kantono	15	15
(South Korea) Ha Tae-kwon (South Korea) Kang Kyung-jin	15	14	15
(Denmark) Jon Holst-Christensen (Denmark) Thomas Lund	11	17	11
(China) Ge Cheng (China) Tao Xiaoqiang	8	2
2	(Malaysia) Cheah Soon Kit (Malaysia) Yap Kim Hock	18	15

Quarterfinals
(Russia) Andrey Antropov (Russia) Nikolai Zuyev	5	1
4	(Indonesia) Antonius Ariantho (Indonesia) Denny Kantono	15	15
(South Korea) Ha Tae-kwon (South Korea) Kang Kyung-jin	17	8
2	(Malaysia) Cheah Soon Kit (Malaysia) Yap Kim Hock	18	15

Semifinals
4	(Indonesia) Antonius Ariantho (Indonesia) Denny Kantono	10	4
2	(Malaysia) Cheah Soon Kit (Malaysia) Yap Kim Hock	15	15

== Sources ==
- Badminton at the 1996 Atlanta Summer Games: Men's Doubles
- The Official Report of the Centennial Olympic Games Volume Three ˗ The Competition Results (PDF). p. 112. Archived from the original (PDF) on 27 September 2007.
