= Antonius Ariantho =

Indonesian badminton player

Personal information
- Born: S. Antonius Budi Ariantho; 3 October 1973 (age 53) Pekalongan, Central Java, Indonesia
- Height: 1.70 m (5 ft 7 in)
- Weight: 66 kg (146 lb)

Sport
- Country: Indonesia
- Sport: Badminton
- Handedness: Right
- Event: Men's doubles

Men's doubles
- BWF profile
Medal record
Men's badminton
Representing Indonesia
Olympic Games
Bronze medal – third place	1996 Atlanta	Men's doubles
World Cup
Gold medal – first place	1996 Jakarta	Men's doubles
Bronze medal – third place	1995 Jakarta	Men's doubles
Thomas Cup
Gold medal – first place	1996 Hong Kong	Men's team
Gold medal – first place	2000 Kuala Lumpur	Men's team
Sudirman Cup
Bronze medal – third place	1997 Glasgow	Mixed team
Asian Championships
Gold medal – first place	1997 Kuala Lumpur	Men's doubles
Bronze medal – third place	2000 Jakarta	Men's doubles
Asian Cup
Bronze medal – third place	1994 Beijing	Men's doubles
SEA Games
Gold medal – first place	1995 Chiang Mai	Men's team
Bronze medal – third place	1995 Chiang Mai	Men's doubles

S. Antonius Budi Ariantho (born 3 October 1973), also known as Antonius Ariantho or Antonius Irianto, is a retired Indonesian badminton player who specialized in men's doubles now a coach. During the 1990s he shared numerous international titles with his regular partner Denny Kantono including the French (1993); Hong Kong (1993); Denmark (1994); Thailand (1994); Chinese Taipei (1995, 1996); and Indonesia (1996) Opens; and the (now defunct) Badminton World Cup (1996) and World Badminton Grand Prix (1998) events. They were runners-up at the prestigious All-England Open in 1995, and bronze medalists at the 1996 Olympics in Atlanta. Their nickname for this famous couple was "Denny & Anton". After retiring as players, both Antonius and Denny Kantono pursued careers as badminton coaches at the PB Djarum Kudus club.

== 1996 Olympics ==
Ariantho competed in badminton at the 1996 Summer Olympics in men's doubles, with Denny Kantono, and won a bronze medal. They lost in semifinals against Cheah Soon Kit and Yap Kim Hock, of Malaysia, 15–10, 15–4, and in the bronze medal match they defeated Soo Beng Kiang and Tan Kim Her, of Malaysia, 15–4, 12–15, 15–8.

== Achievements ==
=== Olympic Games ===
Men's doubles
Year	Venue	Partner	Opponent	Score	Result
1996	GSU Sports Arena; Atlanta, United States	(Indonesia) Denny Kantono	(Malaysia) Soo Beng Kiang (Malaysia) Tan Kim Her	15–4, 12–15, 15–8	Bronze

=== World Cup ===
Men's doubles
Year	Venue	Partner	Opponent	Score	Result
1996	Jakarta, Indonesia	(Indonesia) Denny Kantono	(Indonesia) Rexy Mainaky (Indonesia) Sigit Budiarto	15–8, 15–2	Gold
1995	Jakarta, Indonesia	(Indonesia) Denny Kantono	(Thailand) Sakrapee Thongsari (Thailand) Pramote Teerawiwatana	8–15, 8–15	Bronze

=== Asian Championships ===
Men's doubles
Year	Venue	Partner	Opponent	Score	Result
2000	Jakarta, Indonesia	(Indonesia) Candra Wijaya	(Malaysia) Choong Tan Fook (Malaysia) Lee Wan Wah	12–15, 5–15	Bronze
1997	Kuala Lumpur, Malaysia	(Indonesia) Denny Kantono	(Malaysia) Choong Tan Fook (Malaysia) Lee Wan Wah	4–15, 15–9, 15–7	Gold

=== Asian Cup ===
Men's doubles
Year	Venue	Partner	Opponent	Score	Result
1994	Beijing Gymnasium; Beijing, China	(Indonesia) Denny Kantono	(Indonesia) Rexy Mainaky (Indonesia) Ricky Subagja	2–15, 7–15	Bronze

=== SEA Games ===
Men's doubles
Year	Venue	Partner	Opponent	Score	Result
1995	Gymnasium 3, 700th Anniversary Sport Complex; Chiang Mai, Thailand	(Indonesia) Denny Kantono	(Malaysia) Cheah Soon Kit (Malaysia) Yap Kim Hock	11–15, 15–6, 7–15	Bronze

=== IBF World Grand Prix ===
The World Badminton Grand Prix sanctioned by International Badminton Federation (IBF) since 1983.

Men's doubles
Year	Tournament	Partner	Opponent	Score	Result
1999	Chinese Taipei Open	(Indonesia) Denny Kantono	(Malaysia) Choong Tan Fook (Malaysia) Cheah Soon Kit	15–4, 14–17, 15–8	(gold) Winner
1998	Grand Prix Finals	(Indonesia) Denny Kantono	(Indonesia) Halim Haryanto (Indonesia) Tony Gunawan	15–11, 5–15, 15–11	(gold) Winner
1998	Japan Open	(Indonesia) Denny Kantono	(Malaysia) Yap Kim Hock (Malaysia) Cheah Soon Kit	9–15, 7–15	(silver) Runner-up
1997	Malaysia Open	(Indonesia) Denny Kantono	(Indonesia) Rexy Mainaky (Indonesia) Ricky Subagja	15–17, 12–15	(silver) Runner-up
1997	Japan Open	(Indonesia) Denny Kantono	(Indonesia) Rexy Mainaky (Indonesia) Ricky Subagja	11–15, 15–7, 7–15	(silver) Runner-up
1997	Chinese Taipei Open	(Indonesia) Denny Kantono	(Indonesia) Sigit Budiarto (Indonesia) Candra Wijaya	11–15, 2–15	(silver) Runner-up
1996	Hong Kong Open	(Indonesia) Denny Kantono	(Malaysia) Yap Kim Hock (Malaysia) Cheah Soon Kit	15–6, 15–3	(gold) Winner
1996	Indonesia Open	(Indonesia) Denny Kantono	(Indonesia) Davis Efraim (Indonesia) Halim Haryanto	15–3, 15–10	(gold) Winner
1996	Chinese Taipei Open	(Indonesia) Denny Kantono	(Sweden) Peter Axelsson (Sweden) Pär-Gunnar Jönsson	15–6, 15–7	(gold) Winner
1995	Singapore Open	(Indonesia) Denny Kantono	(Indonesia) Rexy Mainaky (Indonesia) Ricky Subagja	7–15, 16–18	(silver) Runner-up
1995	Indonesia Open	(Indonesia) Denny Kantono	(Indonesia) Bambang Suprianto (Indonesia) Rudy Gunawan	12–15, 9–15	(silver) Runner-up
1995	All England Open	(Indonesia) Denny Kantono	(Indonesia) Rexy Mainaky (Indonesia) Ricky Subagja	12–15, 18–15, 9–15	(silver) Runner-up
1995	Chinese Taipei Open	(Indonesia) Denny Kantono	(Malaysia) Yap Yee Guan (Malaysia) Yap Yee Hup	15–7, 14–18, 15–2	(gold) Winner
1994	Thailand Open	(Indonesia) Denny Kantono	(Thailand) Sakrapee Thongsari (Thailand) Pramote Teerawiwatana	12–15, 15–12, 15–10	(gold) Winner
1994	Denmark Open	(Indonesia) Denny Kantono	(Denmark) Jon Holst-Christensen (Denmark) Thomas Lund	15–8, 5–15, 15–9	(gold) Winner
1994	German Open	(Indonesia) Denny Kantono	(Denmark) Jon Holst-Christensen (Denmark) Thomas Lund	6–15, 2–15	(silver) Runner-up
1994	Dutch Open	(Indonesia) Denny Kantono	(England) Simon Archer (England) Chris Hunt	17–18, 15–5, 15–8	(gold) Winner
1993	Hong Kong Open	(Indonesia) Denny Kantono	(Thailand) Sakrapee Thongsari (Thailand) Pramote Teerawiwatana	10–15, 15–3, 17–14	(gold) Winner
1993	U.S. Open	(Indonesia) Denny Kantono	(Denmark) Jon Holst-Christensen (Denmark) Thomas Lund	7–15, 7–15	(silver) Runner-up
1993	French Open	(Indonesia) Denny Kantono	(Indonesia) Rudy Gunawan Haditono (Indonesia) Dicky Purwotsugiono	15–11, 18–16	(gold) Winner

=== IBF International ===
Men's doubles
Year	Tournament	Partner	Opponent	Score	Result
1994	Hamburg Cup	(Indonesia) Dharma Gunawi	(Indonesia) Imay Hendra (Indonesia) Dicky Purwotjugiono	15–7, 12–15, 4–15	(silver) Runner-up
