= Choong Tan Fook =

Malaysian badminton player

Choong Tan Fook 钟腾福 AMN
Personal information
- Born: 6 February 1976 (age 50) Perak, Malaysia
- Years active: 1994–2010
- Height: 1.79 m (5 ft 10 in)
- Weight: 80 kg (176 lb)
- Spouse: Zhang Jiewen (m. 2010)

Sport
- Country: Malaysia
- Sport: Badminton
- Handedness: Left

Men's doubles
- Highest ranking: 1 (2004)
Medal record
Men's badminton
Representing Malaysia
World Championships
| Bronze medal – third place | 2001 Seville | Men's doubles |
| Bronze medal – third place | 2007 Kuala Lumpur | Men's doubles |
World Cup
| Bronze medal – third place | 1997 Yogyakarta | Men's doubles |
Thomas Cup
| Silver medal – second place | 1998 Hong Kong | Team |
| Silver medal – second place | 2002 Guangzhou | Team |
| Bronze medal – third place | 2006 Sendai & Tokyo | Team |
| Bronze medal – third place | 2008 Jakarta | Team |
Commonwealth Games
| Gold medal – first place | 1998 Kuala Lumpur | Men's doubles |
| Gold medal – first place | 1998 Kuala Lumpur | Men's team |
| Gold medal – first place | 2006 Melbourne | Mixed team |
| Silver medal – second place | 2002 Manchester | Men's doubles |
| Silver medal – second place | 2006 Melbourne | Men's doubles |
Asian Games
| Bronze medal – third place | 2002 Busan | Men's team |
Asian Championships
| Gold medal – first place | 2006 Johor Bahru | Men's doubles |
| Gold medal – first place | 2007 Johor Bahru | Men's doubles |
| Silver medal – second place | 1997 Kuala Lumpur | Men's doubles |
| Silver medal – second place | 2000 Jakarta | Men's doubles |
SEA Games
| Gold medal – first place | 2001 Kuala Lumpur | Men's team |
| Gold medal – first place | 2003 Ho Chi Minh | Men's doubles |
| Gold medal – first place | 2005 Manila | Men's team |
| Silver medal – second place | 1999 Bandar Seri Begawan | Men's team |
| Bronze medal – third place | 1999 Bandar Seri Begawan | Men's doubles |
| Bronze medal – third place | 2003 Ho Chi Minh | Men's team |
| Bronze medal – third place | 2005 Manila | Men's doubles |

Choong Tan Fook
- Simplified Chinese: 钟腾福
- Traditional Chinese: 鍾騰福
Transcriptions
Standard Mandarin
- Hanyu Pinyin: Zhōng Téngfú
Yue: Cantonese
- Jyutping: Zung1 Tang4 Fuk1

Choong Tan Fook AMN (born 6 February 1976) is a Malaysian former badminton player. Choong is coaches the Hong Kong badminton team.

== Career overview ==
Choong made his debut in Olympic Games in 2000 Sydney. Partnered with Lee Wan Wah, they advance to the semi-finals stage, but lost to South Korean pair Lee Dong-soo and Yoo Yong-sung in the rubber game. The duo played in the bronze medal match against another South Korean Ha Tae-kwon and Kim Dong-moon, but lost in straight game with the score 2–15, 8–15.

In 2004 Athens, Choong and Lee had a bye in the first round and defeated Pramote Teerawiwatana and Tesana Panvisvas of Thailand in the second. In the quarter-finals, they lost to Lee Dong-soo & Yoo Yong-sung of South Korea 11–15, 15–11, 15–9.

In 2008 Beijing, Choong and Lee competed as the fourth seeded, however they lost to eventual bronze medalist from South Korea Lee Jae-jin and Hwang Ji-man in the first round with the score 22–20, 13–21, 16–21.

Choong played in the 2008 Thomas Cup series (men's world team championship) for the Malaysian team. In the quarter-final, where Malaysia faced Japan, Choong paired with Koo Kien Keat to defeat Shuichi Sakamoto and Shintaro Ikeda 21–13, 21–11. However, due to illness Choong could not take part in the semi-final showdown against defending champion China which Malaysia narrowly lost 2–3.

== Personal life ==
After a six-year relationship with China's doubles star Zhang Jiewen, Choong and Zhang were married in January 2010. The wedding reception was celebrated on 1 May 2010 in Genting Highlands. They plan to take a honeymoon in Paris, where the 2010 Badminton World Championships will be held. They have two children together.

== Achievements ==
=== World Championships ===
Men's doubles
| Year | Venue | Partner | Opponent | Score | Result |
|---|---|---|---|---|---|
| 2001 | Palacio de Deportes de San Pablo, Seville, Spain | (Malaysia) Lee Wan Wah | (South Korea) Ha Tae-kwon (South Korea) Kim Dong-moon | 7–15, 15–9, 10–15 | Bronze |
| 2007 | Putra Indoor Stadium, Kuala Lumpur, Malaysia | (Malaysia) Lee Wan Wah | (Indonesia) Markis Kido (Indonesia) Hendra Setiawan | 20–22, 26–28 | Bronze |

=== World Cup ===
Men's doubles
| Year | Venue | Partner | Opponent | Score | Result |
|---|---|---|---|---|---|
| 1997 | Among Rogo Sports Hall, Yogyakarta, Indonesia | (Malaysia) Lee Wan Wah | (Indonesia) Rexy Mainaky (Indonesia) Ricky Subagja | 12–15, 3–15 | Bronze |

=== Commonwealth Games ===
Men's doubles
| Year | Venue | Partner | Opponent | Score | Result |
|---|---|---|---|---|---|
| 1998 | Kuala Lumpur Badminton Stadium, Kuala Lumpur, Malaysia | (Malaysia) Lee Wan Wah | (Malaysia) Cheah Soon Kit (Malaysia) Yap Kim Hock | 15–7, 15–4 | Gold |
| 2002 | Bolton Arena, Manchester, England | (Malaysia) Chang Kim Wai | (Malaysia) Chan Chong Ming (Malaysia) Chew Choon Eng | 5–7, 7–4, 7–2, 5–7, 3–7 | Silver |
| 2006 | Melbourne Convention and Exhibition Centre, Melbourne, Australia | (Malaysia) Wong Choong Hann | (Malaysia) Chan Chong Ming (Malaysia) Koo Kien Keat | 13–21, 14–21 | Silver |

=== Asian Championships ===
Men's doubles
| Year | Venue | Partner | Opponent | Score | Result |
|---|---|---|---|---|---|
| 1997 | Stadium Negara, Kuala Lumpur, Malaysia | (Malaysia) Lee Wan Wah | (Indonesia) Antonius Ariantho (Indonesia) Denny Kantono | 15–4, 9–15, 7–15 | Silver |
| 2000 | Istora Gelora Bung Karno, Jakarta, Indonesia | (Malaysia) Lee Wan Wah | (Indonesia) Tony Gunawan (Indonesia) Rexy Mainaky | 8–15, 9–15 | Silver |
| 2006 | Bandaraya Stadium, Johor Bahru, Malaysia | (Malaysia) Lee Wan Wah | (Malaysia) Hoon Thien How (Malaysia) Tan Boon Heong | 17–21, 21–11, 21–12 | Gold |
| 2007 | Bandaraya Stadium, Johor Bahru, Malaysia | (Malaysia) Lee Wan Wah | (Malaysia) Koo Kien Keat (Malaysia) Tan Boon Heong | 21–14, 11–21, 21–12 | Gold |

=== SEA Games ===
Men's doubles
| Year | Venue | Partner | Opponent | Score | Result |
|---|---|---|---|---|---|
| 1999 | Hassanal Bolkiah Sports Complex, Bandar Seri Begawan, Brunei | (Malaysia) Lee Wan Wah | (Thailand) Tesana Panvisvas (Thailand) Pramote Teerawiwatana | 15–12, 10–15, 12–15 | Bronze |
| 2003 | Tan Binh Sport Center, Ho Chi Minh City, Vietnam | (Malaysia) Lee Wan Wah | (Malaysia) Chang Kim Wai (Malaysia) Chew Choon Eng | 15–5, 15–6 | Gold |
| 2005 | Philsports Arena, Manila, Philippines | (Malaysia) Wong Choong Hann | (Indonesia) Luluk Hadiyanto (Indonesia) Alvent Yulianto | 10–15, 2–15 | Bronze |

=== BWF Superseries and Grand Prix ===
Men's doubles
| Year | Tournament | Partner | Opponent | Score | Result |
|---|---|---|---|---|---|
| 1996 | Malaysia Open | (Malaysia) Lee Wan Wah | (Malaysia) Cheah Soon Kit (Malaysia) Yap Kim Hock | 5–15, 3–15 | (silver) Runner-up |
| 1996 | Vietnam Open | (Malaysia) Lee Wan Wah | (China) Liu Yong (China) Zhang Wei | 15–6, 15–6 | (gold) Winner |
| 1998 | Dutch Open | (Malaysia) Cheah Soon Kit | (Sweden) Peter Axelsson (Sweden) Pär-Gunnar Jönsson | 15–11, 15–9 | (gold) Winner |
| 1999 | Chinese Taipei Open | (Malaysia) Cheah Soon Kit | (Indonesia) Antonius Ariantho (Indonesia) Denny Kantono | 4–15, 17–14, 8–15 | (silver) Runner-up |
| 1999 | Singapore Open | (Malaysia) Lee Wan Wah | (Indonesia) Tony Gunawan (Indonesia) Candra Wijaya | 15–7, 14–15, 15–12 | (gold) Winner |
| 1999 | Dutch Open | (Malaysia) Lee Wan Wah | (Denmark) Martin Lundgaard Hansen (Denmark) Lars Paaske | 15–4, 6–15, 15–9 | (gold) Winner |
| 1999 | German Open | (Malaysia) Lee Wan Wah | (Sweden) Peter Axelsson (Sweden) Pär-Gunnar Jönsson | 15–9, 15–6 | (gold) Winner |
| 2002 | Japan Open | (Malaysia) Lee Wan Wah | (Malaysia) Chan Chong Ming (Malaysia) Chew Choon Eng | Walkover | (silver) Runner-up |
| 2002 | Malaysia Open | (Malaysia) Chang Kim Wai | (China) Chen Qiqiu (China) Liu Yong | 14–17, 3–15 | (silver) Runner-up |
| 2003 | Hong Kong Open | (Malaysia) Lee Wan Wah | (South Korea) Lee Dong-soo (South Korea) Yoo Yong-sung | 13–15, 15–6, 6–15 | (silver) Runner-up |
| 2003 | China Open | (Malaysia) Lee Wan Wah | (Denmark) Lars Paaske (Denmark) Jonas Rasmussen | 12–15, 10–15 | (silver) Runner-up |
| 2004 | All England Open | (Malaysia) Lee Wan Wah | (Denmark) Jens Eriksen (Denmark) Martin Lundgaard Hansen | 15–9, 13–15, 3–15 | (silver) Runner-up |
| 2004 | Malaysia Open | (Malaysia) Lee Wan Wah | (Indonesia) Luluk Hadiyanto (Indonesia) Alvent Yulianto | 15–12, 15–7 | (gold) Winner |
| 2004 | China Open | (Malaysia) Chew Choon Eng | (Indonesia) Sigit Budiarto (Indonesia) Candra Wijaya | Walkover | (silver) Runner-up |
| 2005 | China Masters | (Malaysia) Lee Wan Wah | (China) Guo Zhendong (China) Xie Zhongbo | 10–15, 4–15 | (silver) Runner-up |
| 2005 | Dutch Open | (Malaysia) Lee Wan Wah | (Japan) Keita Masuda (Japan) Tadashi Ohtsuka | 15–7, 15–4 | (gold) Winner |
| 2006 | All England Open | (Malaysia) Lee Wan Wah | (Denmark) Jens Eriksen (Denmark) Martin Lundgaard Hansen | 6–15, 17–14, 15–2 | (silver) Runner-up |
| 2006 | Hong Kong Open | (Malaysia) Lee Wan Wah | (Indonesia) Markis Kido (Indonesia) Hendra Setiawan | 24–22, 16–21, 20–22 | (silver) Runner-up |
| 2007 | Singapore Open | (Malaysia) Lee Wan Wah | (China) Cai Yun (China) Fu Haifeng | 21–16, 22–24, 18–21 | (silver) Runner-up |
| 2007 | Macau Open | (Malaysia) Lee Wan Wah | (Malaysia) Koo Kien Keat (Malaysia) Tan Boon Heong | 18–21, 21–17, 21–23 | (silver) Runner-up |
| 2007 | French Open | (Malaysia) Lee Wan Wah | (China) Cai Yun (China) Fu Haifeng | 14–21, 19–21 | (silver) Runner-up |
| 2008 | Vietnam Open | (Malaysia) Lee Wan Wah | (Indonesia) Fran Kurniawan (Indonesia) Rendra Wijaya | 21–14, 21–10 | (gold) Winner |
| 2009 | India Open | (Malaysia) Lee Wan Wah | (Indonesia) Hendri Kurniawan Saputra (Indonesia) Hendra Wijaya | 21–9, 21–11 | (gold) Winner |
| 2009 | Thailand Open | (Malaysia) Lee Wan Wah | (Malaysia) Chan Peng Soon (Malaysia) Lim Khim Wah | 22–20, 14–21, 11–21 | (silver) Runner-up |
| 2009 | Macau Open | (Malaysia) Lee Wan Wah | (Malaysia) Koo Kien Keat (Malaysia) Tan Boon Heong | 14–21, 21–17, 12–21 | (silver) Runner-up |

BWF Superseries tournament
Grand Prix Gold tournament
Grand Prix tournament
IBF World Grand Prix tournament

== Honour ==
- Malaysia
  - Member of the Order of the Defender of the Realm (A.M.N.) (2000)
