= 1997 Asian Badminton Championships =

Badminton championships

Tournament information
- Location: Stadium Negara, Kuala Lumpur, Malaysia
- Dates: September 3–September 7

The 1997 Asian Badminton Championships was the 16th edition of the Badminton Asia Championships. It was held in Stadium Negara, Kuala Lumpur, Malaysia, from September 3 to September 5 with total prize money of 136,000 US Dollars. At the end of competitions, China took titles from four disciplines; Both the singles and Women's & Mixed doubles, while Indonesia won Men's doubles discipline.

== Medalists ==
Event	Gold	Silver	Bronze
Men's singles	(China) Sun Jun	(Indonesia) Hendrawan	(Indonesia) Ardy Wiranata
Men's singles	(China) Sun Jun	(Indonesia) Hendrawan	(Indonesia) Hermawan Susanto
Women's singles	(China) Yao Yan	(China) Yu Hua	(Indonesia) Lidya Djaelawijaya
Women's singles	(China) Yao Yan	(China) Yu Hua	(China) Wu Huimin
Men's doubles	(Indonesia) Antonius Ariantho (Indonesia) Denny Kantono	(Malaysia) Lee Wan Wah (Malaysia) Choong Tan Fook	(Indonesia) Eng Hian (Indonesia) Hermono Yuwono
Men's doubles	(Indonesia) Antonius Ariantho (Indonesia) Denny Kantono	(Malaysia) Lee Wan Wah (Malaysia) Choong Tan Fook	(Malaysia) Chew Choon Eng (Malaysia) Lee Chee Leong
Women's doubles	(China) Liu Zhong (China) Huang Nanyan	(China) Liu Lu (China) Qian Hong	(Chinese Taipei) Chen Li-chin (Chinese Taipei) Tsai Hui-min
Women's doubles	(China) Liu Zhong (China) Huang Nanyan	(China) Liu Lu (China) Qian Hong	(Indonesia) Cynthia Tuwankotta (Indonesia) Etty Tantri
Mixed doubles	(China) Zhang Jun (China) Liu Lu	(China) Yang Ming (China) Qian Hong	(Indonesia) Sandiarto (Indonesia) Finarsih
Mixed doubles	(China) Zhang Jun (China) Liu Lu	(China) Yang Ming (China) Qian Hong	(Indonesia) Wahyu Agung (Indonesia) Rosalia Anastasia

== Medal table ==
Rank	Nation	Gold	Silver	Bronze	Total
1	China (CHN)	4	3	1	8
2	Indonesia (INA)	1	1	7	9
3	Malaysia (MAS)	0	1	1	2
4	Chinese Taipei (TPE)	0	0	1	1
Totals (4 entries)		5	5	10	20

== Final results ==
=== Men's singles ===
Semi-finals
(China) Sun Jun	15	15
(Indonesia) Hermawan Susanto	4	8
(Indonesia) Hendrawan	18	15
(Indonesia) Ardy Wiranata	15	10

Final
(China) Sun Jun	18	8	15
(Indonesia) Hendrawan	14	15	9

=== Women's singles ===
Semi-finals
(Indonesia) Lidya Djaelawijaya	7	11	8
(China) Yu Hua	11	2	11
(China) Wu Huimin	7	5
(China) Yao Yan	11	11

Final
(China) Yu Hua	11	9	5
(China) Yao Yan	2	11	11

=== Men's doubles ===
Semi-finals
(Indonesia) Antonius Ariantho (Indonesia) Denny Kantono	15	15
(Indonesia) Eng Hian (Indonesia) Hermono Yuwono	12	10
(Malaysia) Chew Choon Eng (Malaysia) Lee Chee Leong	13	12
(Malaysia) Choong Tan Fook (Malaysia) Lee Wan Wah	15	15

Final
(Indonesia) Antonius Ariantho (Indonesia) Denny Kantono	4	15	15
(Malaysia) Choong Tan Fook (Malaysia) Lee Wan Wah	15	9	7

=== Women's doubles ===
Semi-finals
(China) Liu Zhong (China) Huang Nanyan	15	15
(Chinese Taipei) Chen Li-chin (Chinese Taipei) Tsai Hui-min	7	9
(Indonesia) Cynthia Tuwankotta (Indonesia) Etty Tantri	10	9
(China) Liu Lu (China) Qian Hong	15	15

Final
(China) Liu Zhong (China) Huang Nanyan	12	17	15
(China) Liu Lu (China) Qian Hong	15	14	6

=== Mixed doubles ===
Semi-finals
(Indonesia) Sandiarto (Indonesia) Finarsih	3	15	4
(China) Zhang Jun (China) Liu Lu	15	2	15
(China) Yang Ming (China) Qian Hong	15	15
(Indonesia) Wahyu Agung (Indonesia) Rosalia Anastasia	10	11

Final
(China) Zhang Jun (China) Liu Lu	15	17
(China) Yang Ming (China) Qian Hong	12	16
