= Denny Kantono =

Indonesian badminton player (born 1970)

Personal information
- Born: 12 January 1970 (age 56) Samarinda, East Kalimantan, Indonesia
- Height: 1.82 m (6 ft 0 in)

Sport
- Country: Indonesia
- Sport: Badminton
- Handedness: Right
- Event: Men's doubles

Men's doubles
- BWF profile
Medal record
Men's badminton
Representing Indonesia
Olympic Games
Bronze medal – third place	1996 Atlanta	Men's doubles
World Cup
Gold medal – first place	1996 Jakarta	Men's doubles
Bronze medal – third place	1995 Jakarta	Men's doubles
Sudirman Cup
Silver medal – second place	1993 Birmingham	Mixed team
Bronze medal – third place	1997 Glasgow	Mixed team
Thomas Cup
Gold medal – first place	1996 Hong Kong	Men's team
Asian Championships
Gold medal – first place	1997 Kuala Lumpur	Men's doubles
Asian Cup
Bronze medal – third place	1994 Beijing	Men's doubles
SEA Games
Gold medal – first place	1993 Singapore	Men's team
Gold medal – first place	1995 Chiang Mai	Men's team
Silver medal – second place	1993 Singapore	Mixed doubles
Silver medal – second place	1995 Chiang Mai	Mixed doubles
Bronze medal – third place	1993 Singapore	Men's doubles
Bronze medal – third place	1995 Chiang Mai	Men's doubles

Denny Kantono (Chinese: 关有明; born 12 January 1970) is a retired Chinese-Indonesian badminton player who specialized in men's doubles. He shared numerous international titles with his regular partner Antonius Ariantho including the French (1993), Hong Kong (1993), Denmark (1994), Thailand (1994), Chinese Taipei (1995, 1999), and Indonesia (1996) Opens; as well as the (now defunct) Badminton World Cup (1996) and World Badminton Grand Prix (1998) events. They were runners-up at the prestigious All-England Championships in 1995 and bronze medalists at the 1996 Olympics in Atlanta.

Kantono competed in badminton at the 1996 Summer Olympics in men's doubles, with Antonius Ariantho, and won a bronze medal. They lost in semifinals against Cheah Soon Kit and Yap Kim Hock, of Malaysia, 15–10, 15–4, and in the bronze medal match they defeated Soo Beng Kiang and Tan Kim Her, of Malaysia, 15–4, 12–15, 15–8. Their nickname as a famous badminton couple was "Denny & Anton". After retiring as players, both Denny Kantono and Antonius pursued careers as badminton coaches at the PB Djarum Kudus club.

== Personal life ==
Kantono has a daughter that also a badminton athlete name Serena Kani who plays in 2015 BWF World Junior Championships in Peru.

== Achievements ==
=== Olympic Games ===
Men's doubles
Year	Venue	Partner	Opponent	Score	Result
1996	GSU Sports Arena; Atlanta, United States	(Indonesia) Antonius Ariantho	(Malaysia) Soo Beng Kiang (Malaysia) Tan Kim Her	15–4, 12–15, 15–8	Bronze

=== World Cup ===
Men's doubles
Year	Venue	Partner	Opponent	Score	Result
1995	Istora Senayan; Jakarta, Indonesia	(Indonesia) Antonius Ariantho	(Thailand) Pramote Teerawiwatana (Thailand) Sakrapee Thongsari	8–15, 8–15	Bronze
1996	Istora Senayan, Jakarta, Indonesia	(Indonesia) Antonius Ariantho	(Indonesia) Sigit Budiarto (Indonesia) Rexy Mainaky	15–8, 15–2	Gold

=== Asian Championships ===
Men's doubles
Year	Venue	Partner	Opponent	Score	Result
1997	Stadium Negara; Kuala Lumpur, Malaysia	(Indonesia) Antonius Ariantho	(Malaysia) Choong Tan Fook (Malaysia) Lee Wan Wah	4–15, 15–9, 15–7	Gold

=== Asian Cup ===
Men's doubles
Year	Venue	Partner	Opponent	Score	Result
1994	Beijing Gymnasium; Beijing, China	(Indonesia) Antonius Ariantho	(Indonesia) Rexy Mainaky (Indonesia) Ricky Subagja	2–15, 7–15	Bronze

=== SEA Games ===
Men's doubles
Year	Venue	Partner	Opponent	Score	Result
1993	Singapore Badminton Hall, Singapore	(Indonesia) Rudy Gunawan	(Malaysia) Cheah Soon Kit (Malaysia) Soo Beng Kiang	2–15, 15–12, 14–17	Bronze
1995	Gymnasium 3, 700th Anniversary Sport Complex; Chiang Mai, Thailand	(Indonesia) Antonius Ariantho	(Malaysia) Cheah Soon Kit (Malaysia) Yap Kim Hock	11–15, 15–6, 7–15	Bronze

Mixed doubles
Year	Venue	Partner	Opponent	Score	Result
1993	Singapore Badminton Hall, Singapore	(Indonesia) Minarti Timur	(Indonesia) Rudy Gunawan (Indonesia) Eliza Nathanael	6–15, 15–18	Silver
1995	Gymnasium 3, 700th Anniversary Sport Complex; Chiang Mai, Thailand	(Indonesia) Eliza Nathanael	(Indonesia) Tri Kusharjanto (Indonesia) Minarti Timur	8–15, 4–15	Silver

=== IBF World Grand Prix ===
The World Badminton Grand Prix was sanctioned by the International Badminton Federation from 1983 to 2006.

Men's doubles
Year	Tournament	Partner	Opponent	Score	Result
1993	French Open	(Indonesia) Antonius Ariantho	(Indonesia) Rudy Gunawan Haditono (Indonesia) Dicky Purwotsugiono	15–11, 18–16	(gold) Winner
1993	U.S. Open	(Indonesia) Antonius Ariantho	(Denmark) Jon Holst-Christensen (Denmark) Thomas Lund	7–15, 7–15	(silver) Runner-up
1993	Hong Kong Open	(Indonesia) Antonius Ariantho	(Thailand) Pramote Teerawiwatana (Thailand) Sakrapee Thongsari	10–15, 15–3, 17–14	(gold) Winner
1994	Japan Open	(Indonesia) Ricky Subagja	(Thailand) Pramote Teerawiwatana (Thailand) Sakrapee Thongsari	15–11, 12–15, 18–16	(gold) Winner
1994	Korea Open	(Indonesia) Ricky Subagja	(Sweden) Peter Axelsson (Sweden) Pär-Gunnar Jönsson	14–17, 7–15	(silver) Runner-up
1994	Dutch Open	(Indonesia) Antonius Ariantho	(England) Simon Archer (England) Chris Hunt	17–18, 15–5, 15–8	(gold) Winner
1994	German Open	(Indonesia) Antonius Ariantho	(Denmark) Jon Holst-Christensen (Denmark) Thomas Lund	6–15, 2–15	(silver) Runner-up
1994	Denmark Open	(Indonesia) Antonius Ariantho	(Denmark) Jon Holst-Christensen (Denmark) Thomas Lund	15–8, 5–15, 15–9	(gold) Winner
1994	Thailand Open	(Indonesia) Antonius Ariantho	(Thailand) Pramote Teerawiwatana (Thailand) Sakrapee Thongsari	12–15, 15–12, 15–10	(gold) Winner
1995	Chinese Taipei Open	(Indonesia) Antonius Ariantho	(Malaysia) Yap Yee Guan (Malaysia) Yap Yee Hup	15–7, 14–18, 15–2	(gold) Winner
1995	All England Open	(Indonesia) Antonius Ariantho	(Indonesia) Rexy Mainaky (Indonesia) Ricky Subagja	12–15, 18–15, 9–15	(silver) Runner-up
1995	Indonesia Open	(Indonesia) Antonius Ariantho	(Indonesia) Rudy Gunawan (Indonesia) Bambang Suprianto	12–15, 9–15	(silver) Runner-up
1995	Singapore Open	(Indonesia) Antonius Ariantho	(Indonesia) Rexy Mainaky (Indonesia) Ricky Subagja	7–15, 16–18	(silver) Runner-up
1996	Chinese Taipei Open	(Indonesia) Antonius Ariantho	(Sweden) Peter Axelsson (Sweden) Pär-Gunnar Jönsson	15–6, 15–7	(gold) Winner
1996	Indonesia Open	(Indonesia) Antonius Ariantho	(Indonesia) Davis Efraim (Indonesia) Halim Haryanto	15–3, 15–10	(gold) Winner
1996	Hong Kong Open	(Indonesia) Antonius Ariantho	(Malaysia) Cheah Soon Kit (Malaysia) Yap Kim Hock	15–6, 15–3	(gold) Winner
1997	Chinese Taipei Open	(Indonesia) Antonius Ariantho	(Indonesia) Sigit Budiarto (Indonesia) Candra Wijaya	11–15, 2–15	(silver) Runner-up
1997	Japan Open	(Indonesia) Antonius Ariantho	(Indonesia) Rexy Mainaky (Indonesia) Ricky Subagja	11–15, 15–7, 7–15	(silver) Runner-up
1997	Malaysia Open	(Indonesia) Antonius Ariantho	(Indonesia) Rexy Mainaky (Indonesia) Ricky Subagja	15–17, 12–15	(silver) Runner-up
1998	Japan Open	(Indonesia) Antonius Ariantho	(Malaysia) Cheah Soon Kit (Malaysia) Yap Kim Hock	9–15, 7–15	(silver) Runner-up
1998	Brunei Open	(Denmark) Michael Søgaard	(Indonesia) Halim Haryanto (Indonesia) Tony Gunawan	2–15, 8–15	(silver) Runner-up
1998	Grand Prix Finals	(Indonesia) Antonius Ariantho	(Indonesia) Halim Haryanto (Indonesia) Tony Gunawan	15–11, 5–15, 15–11	(gold) Winner
1999	Chinese Taipei Open	(Indonesia) Antonius Ariantho	(Malaysia) Cheah Soon Kit (Malaysia) Choong Tan Fook	15–4, 14–17, 15–8	(gold) Winner

Mixed doubles
Year	Tournament	Partner	Opponent	Score	Result
1992	Thailand Open	(Indonesia) Zelin Resiana	(Indonesia) Aryono Miranat (Indonesia) Eliza Nathanael	2–15, 15–2, 1–15	(silver) Runner-up
1993	Chinese Taipei Open	(Indonesia) Zelin Resiana	(England) Nick Ponting (England) Gillian Clark	Walkover	(gold) Winner

IBF Grand Prix tournament
IBF Grand Prix Finals tournament

=== IBF International ===
Men's doubles
Year	Tournament	Partner	Opponent	Score	Result
1993	Polish International	(Indonesia) Felix Antonius	(Denmark) Jim Laugesen (Denmark) Janek Roos	15–1, 15–7	(gold) Winner
