= Badminton at the 1996 Summer Olympics =

Badminton at the Games of the XXVI Olympiad
- Venue: GSU Sports Arena
- Dates: July 24 – August 1, 1996
- No. of events: 5 (2 men, 2 women, 1 mixed)
- Competitors: 192 from 37 nations

Badminton at the 1996 Summer Olympics included the four events (men's and women's singles, men's and women's doubles) as well as a new event: mixed doubles. An additional change to the tournament was the playoff game for the bronze medal rather than the awarding of two bronzes. The tournament was single-elimination. Matches consisted of three sets, with sets being to 15 except. The tournament was held at the Georgia State University gymnasium.

== Medalists ==
Event	Gold	Silver	Bronze
Men's singles	Poul-Erik Høyer Larsen; Denmark	Dong Jiong; China	Rashid Sidek; Malaysia
Men's doubles	Ricky Subagja and Rexy Mainaky (INA)	Cheah Soon Kit and Yap Kim Hock (MAS)	Denny Kantono and Antonius Ariantho (INA)
Women's singles	Bang Soo-hyun; South Korea	Mia Audina; Indonesia	Susi Susanti; Indonesia
Women's doubles	Ge Fei and Gu Jun (CHN)	Gil Young-ah and Jang Hye-ock (KOR)	Qin Yiyuan and Tang Yongshu (CHN)
Mixed doubles	Kim Dong-moon and Gil Young-ah (KOR)	Park Joo-bong and Ra Kyung-min (KOR)	Liu Jianjun and Sun Man (CHN)

== Medal table ==
Rank	Nation	Gold	Silver	Bronze	Total
1	South Korea	2	2	0	4
2	China	1	1	2	4
2	Indonesia	1	1	2	4
4	Denmark	1	0	0	1
5	Malaysia	0	1	1	2
Totals (5 entries)		5	5	5	15

== Participating nations ==
A total of 37 nations participated in this event.

- Australia (8)
- Austria (1)
- Belarus (2)
- Bulgaria (3)
- Canada (7)
- China (20)
- Denmark (16)
- Finland (2)
- France (2)
- Great Britain (11)
- Germany (6)
- Guatemala (1)
- Hong Kong (3)
- Hungary (1)
- Iceland (1)
- India (2)
- Indonesia (20)
- Japan (7)
- South Korea (17)
- Malaysia (7)
- Mauritius (4)
- Netherlands (5)
- New Zealand (2)
- Nigeria (2)
- Peru (1)
- Philippines (1)
- Poland (1)
- Russia (5)
- Singapore (1)
- Suriname (1)
- Switzerland (2)
- Sweden (10)
- Chinese Taipei (6)
- Thailand (7)
- Trinidad and Tobago (1)
- Ukraine (3)
- United States (3)

== Sources ==
- "Badminton at the 1996 Atlanta Summer Games". sports-reference.com. Archived from the original on April 17, 2020.
- "Atlanta 1996 Olympic Games". tournamentsoftware.com.
- "ATLANTA 1996 OLYMPIC GAMES". Badminton World Federation. Archived from the original on June 1, 2018.
