= Sigit Budiarto =

Indonesian badminton player (born 1975)

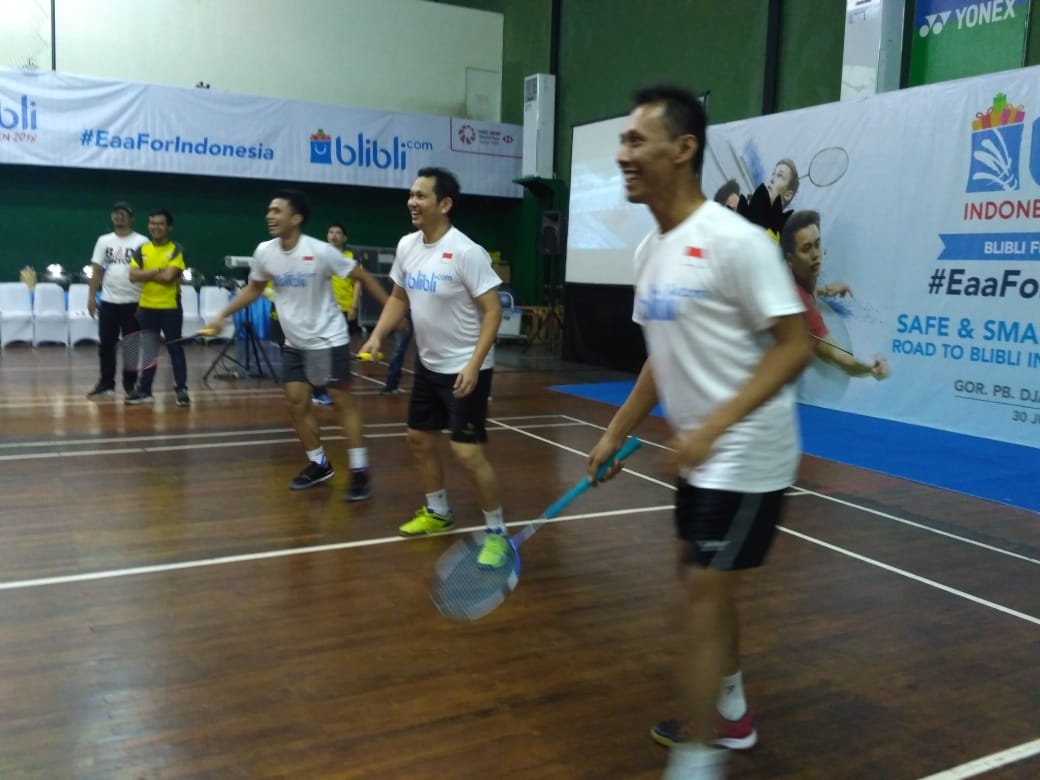

Personal information
- Born: 24 November 1975 (age 50) Yogyakarta, Indonesia

Sport
- Country: Indonesia
- Sport: Badminton
- Handedness: Right
- Coached by: Herry Iman Pierngadi

Men's doubles
- Highest ranking: 1
- BWF profile
Medal record
Men's badminton
Representing Indonesia
World Championships
| Gold medal – first place | 1997 Glasgow | Men's doubles |
| Silver medal – second place | 2005 Anaheim | Men's doubles |
| Silver medal – second place | 2003 Birmingham | Men's doubles |
World Cup
| Silver medal – second place | 2005 Yiyang | Men's doubles |
| Silver medal – second place | 1996 Jakarta | Men's doubles |
| Bronze medal – third place | 1997 Yogyakarta | Men's doubles |
Sudirman Cup
| Silver medal – second place | 2005 Beijing | Mixed team |
| Silver medal – second place | 2001 Seville | Mixed team |
| Bronze medal – third place | 2003 Eindhoven | Mixed team |
| Bronze medal – third place | 1997 Glasgow | Mixed team |
Thomas Cup
| Gold medal – first place | 2002 Guangzhou | Men's team |
| Gold medal – first place | 2000 Kuala Lumpur | Men's team |
| Gold medal – first place | 1998 Hong Kong | Men's team |
Asian Games
| Silver medal – second place | 2002 Busan | Men's team |
Asian Championships
| Gold medal – first place | 2004 Kuala Lumpur | Men's doubles |
| Silver medal – second place | 2002 Bangkok | Men's doubles |
| Bronze medal – third place | 1996 Surabaya | Men's doubles |
Asia Cup
| Gold medal – first place | 1997 Jakarta | Men's team |
| Bronze medal – third place | 2001 Singapore | Men's team |
Southeast Asian Games
| Gold medal – first place | 2001 Kuala Lumpur | Men's doubles |
| Gold medal – first place | 1997 Jakarta | Men's doubles |
| Gold medal – first place | 1997 Jakarta | Men's team |
| Silver medal – second place | 2001 Kuala Lumpur | Men's team |
World Junior Championships
| Silver medal – second place | 1992 Jakarta | Men's doubles |

Sigit Budiarto (born 24 November 1975) is a male badminton player from Indonesia noted for his reflexes and deft handling of the racket. A men's doubles specialist, he won numerous international titles between 1995 and 2005, most of them in partnership with Candra Wijaya. He was a member of Indonesia's world champion Thomas Cup (men's international) teams of 1998, 2000 and 2002. Budiarto shared the World Men's Doubles title with Wijaya in 1997 and they were runners-up in this event in 2003 and 2005. They claimed the prestigious All-England Championship in 2003. Among other titles, Budiarto has won doubles at the Asian Championships (in 2004 with Trikus Haryanto), and at the French (1995), Indonesia (1997, 2001); Malaysia (2001, 2005); China (1996, 2004, 2005); Japan (2001); and Singapore (1997, 1998, 2005, 2006) Opens.

In 1998, Budiarto received a two-year doping ban for taking the anabolic steroid nandrolone.

== Achievements ==
=== World Championships ===
Men's doubles
| Year | Venue | Partner | Opponent | Score | Result |
|---|---|---|---|---|---|
| 2005 | Arrowhead Pond, Anaheim, United States | (Indonesia) Candra Wijaya | (United States) Tony Gunawan (United States) Howard Bach | 11–15, 15–10, 11–15 | Silver |
| 2003 | National Indoor Arena, Birmingham, United Kingdom | (Indonesia) Candra Wijaya | (Denmark) Lars Paaske (Denmark) Jonas Rasmussen | 7–15, 15–13, 13–15 | Silver |
| 1997 | Scotstoun Centre, Glasgow, Scotland | (Indonesia) Candra Wijaya | (Malaysia) Yap Kim Hock (Malaysia) Cheah Soon Kit | 8–15, 18–17, 15–7 | Gold |

=== World Cup ===
Men's doubles
| Year | Venue | Partner | Opponent | Score | Result |
|---|---|---|---|---|---|
| 2005 | Yiyang, China | (Indonesia) Candra Wijaya | (China) Cai Yun (China) Fu Haifeng | 11–21, 18–21 | Silver |
| 1997 | Yogyakarta, Indonesia | (Indonesia) Candra Wijaya | (South Korea) Lee Dong-soo (South Korea) Yoo Yong-sung | 15–8, 8–15, 12–15 | Bronze |
| 1996 | Jakarta, Indonesia | (Indonesia) Rexy Mainaky | (Indonesia) Denny Kantono (Indonesia) S. Antonius Budi Ariantho | 8–15, 2–15 | Silver |

=== Asian Championships ===
Men's doubles
| Year | Venue | Partner | Opponent | Score | Result |
|---|---|---|---|---|---|
| 2004 | Kuala Lumpur Badminton Stadium; Kuala Lumpur, Malaysia | (Indonesia) Tri Kusharyanto | (Indonesia) Candra Wijaya (Indonesia) Halim Haryanto | 15–13, 15–5 | Gold |
| 2002 | Bangkok, Thailand | (Indonesia) Candra Wijaya | (South Korea) Ha Tae-kwon (South Korea) Kim Dong-moon | 6–15, 8–15 | Silver |
| 1996 | GOR Pancasila; Surabaya, Indonesia | (Indonesia) Dicky Purwotjugiono | (South Korea) Ha Tae-kwon (South Korea) Kang Kyung-jin | 5–15, 9–15 | Bronze |

=== Southeast Asian Games ===
Men's doubles
| Year | Venue | Partner | Opponent | Score | Result |
|---|---|---|---|---|---|
| 2001 | Malawati Stadium; Shah Alam, Selangor, Malaysia | (Indonesia) Candra Wijaya | (Indonesia) Tony Gunawan (Indonesia) Bambang Suprianto | 15–4, 15–6 | Gold |
| 1997 | Asia-Africa hall, Gelora Bung Karno Sports Complex; Jakarta, Indonesia | (Indonesia) Candra Wijaya | (Indonesia) Ricky Subagja (Indonesia) Rexy Mainaky | 15–4, 14–17, 15–11 | Gold |

=== World Junior Championships ===
Boys' doubles
| Year | Venue | Partner | Opponent | Score | Result |
|---|---|---|---|---|---|
| 1992 | Istora Senayan; Jakarta, Indonesia | (Indonesia) Namrih Suroto | (Indonesia) Budi Santoso (Indonesia) Kusno | 11–15, 15–12, 12–15 | Silver |

=== IBF World Grand Prix ===
The World Badminton Grand Prix sanctioned by International Badminton Federation (IBF) since 1983.

Men's doubles
| Year | Tournament | Partner | Opponent | Score | Result |
|---|---|---|---|---|---|
| 2006 | Singapore Open | (Indonesia) Flandy Limpele | (Denmark) Thomas Laybourn (Denmark) Lars Paaske | 21–8, 21–16 | (gold) Winner |
| 2005 | China Open | (Indonesia) Candra Wijaya | (Denmark) Jens Eriksen (Denmark) Martin Lundgaard Hansen | 17–16, 11–15, 15–13 | (gold) Winner |
| 2005 | Indonesia Open | (Indonesia) Candra Wijaya | (Indonesia) Markis Kido (Indonesia) Hendra Setiawan | 10–15, 15–12, 3–15 | (silver) Runner-up |
| 2005 | Malaysia Open | (Indonesia) Candra Wijaya | (China) Cai Yun (China) Fu Haifeng | 15–11, 17–14 | (gold) Winner |
| 2005 | Singapore Open | (Indonesia) Candra Wijaya | (Denmark) Mathias Boe (Denmark) Carsten Mogensen | 8–15, 15–8, 15–7 | (gold) Winner |
| 2005 | Japan Open | (Indonesia) Candra Wijaya | (Denmark) Jens Eriksen (Denmark) Martin Lundgaard Hansen | 10–15, 3–15 | (silver) Runner-up |
| 2005 | Swiss Open | (Indonesia) Candra Wijaya | (Indonesia) Flandy Limpele (Indonesia) Eng Hian | 8–15, 15–11, 15–11 | (gold) Winner |
| 2005 | Korea Open | (Indonesia) Candra Wijaya | (Denmark) Jens Eriksen (Denmark) Martin Lundgaard Hansen | 15–7, 13–15, 13–15 | (silver) Runner-up |
| 2004 | China Open | (Indonesia) Candra Wijaya | (Malaysia) Chew Choon Eng (Malaysia) Choong Tan Fook | Walkover | (gold) Winner |
| 2003 | All England Open | (Indonesia) Candra Wijaya | (South Korea) Yoo Yong-sung (South Korea) Lee Dong-soo | 15–5, 15–7 | (gold) Winner |
| 2001 | Thailand Open | (Indonesia) Luluk Hadiyanto | (Thailand) Tesana Panvisvas (Thailand) Pramote Teerawiwatana | 5–7, 7–5, 8–6 | (gold) Winner |
| 2001 | Singapore Open | (Indonesia) Candra Wijaya | (Indonesia) Tony Gunawan (Indonesia) Halim Haryanto | 7–5, 3–7, 2–7, 0–7 | (silver) Runner-up |
| 2001 | Indonesia Open | (Indonesia) Candra Wijaya | (Indonesia) Tony Gunawan (Indonesia) Halim Haryanto | 7–2, 7–3, 7–5 | (gold) Winner |
| 2001 | Malaysia Open | (Indonesia) Candra Wijaya | (Indonesia) Tony Gunawan (Indonesia) Halim Haryanto | 7–4, 4–7, 7–2, 2–7, 7–5 | (gold) Winner |
| 2001 | Japan Open | (Indonesia) Candra Wijaya | (Denmark) Lars Paaske (Denmark) Martin Lundgaard Hansen | 15–7, 15–11 | (gold) Winner |
| 2001 | All England Open | (Indonesia) Candra Wijaya | (Indonesia) Tony Gunawan (Indonesia) Halim Haryanto | 13–15, 15–7, 7–15 | (silver) Runner-up |
| 2000 | Grand Prix Finals | (Indonesia) Halim Haryanto | (Indonesia) Tony Gunawan (Indonesia) Candra Wijaya | 5–7, 6–8, 2–7 | (silver) Runner-up |
| 2000 | Dutch Open | (Indonesia) Halim Haryanto | (Denmark) Jim Laugesen (Denmark) Michael Søgaard | 15–11, 15–4 | (gold) Winner |
| 2000 | Thailand Open | (Indonesia) Halim Haryanto | (China) Zhang Jun (China) Zhang Wei | 5–15, 10–15 | (silver) Runner-up |
| 1999 | Hong Kong Open | (Indonesia) Halim Haryanto | (Malaysia) Cheah Soon Kit (Malaysia) Yap Kim Hock | 12–15, 12–15 | (silver) Runner-up |
| 1998 | Singapore Open | (Indonesia) Candra Wijaya | (Indonesia) Ricky Subagja (Indonesia) Rexy Mainaky | 15–5, 15–5 | (gold) Winner |
| 1997 | Grand Prix Finals | (Indonesia) Candra Wijaya | (Malaysia) Cheah Soon Kit (Malaysia) Yap Kim Hock | 17–15, 11–15, 15–5 | (gold) Winner |
| 1997 | Thailand Open | (Indonesia) Candra Wijaya | (South Korea) Lee Dong-soo (South Korea) Yoo Yong-sung | 9–15, 14–17 | (silver) Runner-up |
| 1997 | Singapore Open | (Indonesia) Candra Wijaya | (South Korea) Lee Dong-soo (South Korea) Yoo Yong-sung | 15–8, 15–10 | (gold) Winner |
| 1997 | Indonesia Open | (Indonesia) Candra Wijaya | (South Korea) Lee Dong-soo (South Korea) Yoo Yong-sung | 15–9, 15–10 | (gold) Winner |
| 1997 | Swiss Open | (Indonesia) Candra Wijaya | (South Korea) Lee Dong-soo (South Korea) Yoo Yong-sung | 15–5, 11–15, 4–15 | (silver) Runner-up |
| 1997 | Chinese Taipei Open | (Indonesia) Candra Wijaya | (Indonesia) Antonius Ariantho (Indonesia) Denny Kantono | 15–11, 15–2 | (gold) Winner |
| 1996 | Thailand Open | (Indonesia) Candra Wijaya | (South Korea) Ha Tae-kwon (South Korea) Kang Kyung-jin | 15–11, 10–15, 15–12 | (gold) Winner |
| 1996 | China Open | (Indonesia) Candra Wijaya | (Indonesia) Ricky Subagja (Indonesia) Rexy Mainaky | 15–12, 15–5 | (gold) Winner |
| 1996 | U.S Open | (Indonesia) Candra Wijaya | (Malaysia) Cheah Soon Kit (Malaysia) Yap Kim Hock | 18–16, 15–10 | (gold) Winner |
| 1996 | Swedish Open | (Indonesia) Dicky Purwotjugiono | (Indonesia) Candra Wijaya (Indonesia) Ade Sutrisna | 12–15, 6–15 | (silver) Runner-up |
| 1996 | Swiss Open | (Indonesia) Dicky Purwotjugiono | (Denmark) Jon Holst-Christensen (Denmark) Thomas Lund | 12–15, 13–18 | (silver) Runner-up |
| 1995 | Polish Open | (Indonesia) Dicky Purwotjugiono | (Indonesia) Hadi Sugianto (Indonesia) Seng Kok Kiong | 17–18, 10–15 | (silver) Runner-up |
| 1995 | French Open | (Indonesia) Dicky Purwotjugiono | (Russia) Andrey Antropov (Russia) Nikolai Zuyev | 15–8, 15–11 | (gold) Winner |

IBF Grand Prix tournament
IBF Grand Prix Finals tournament
