= Rexy Mainaky =

Indonesian badminton player (born 1968)

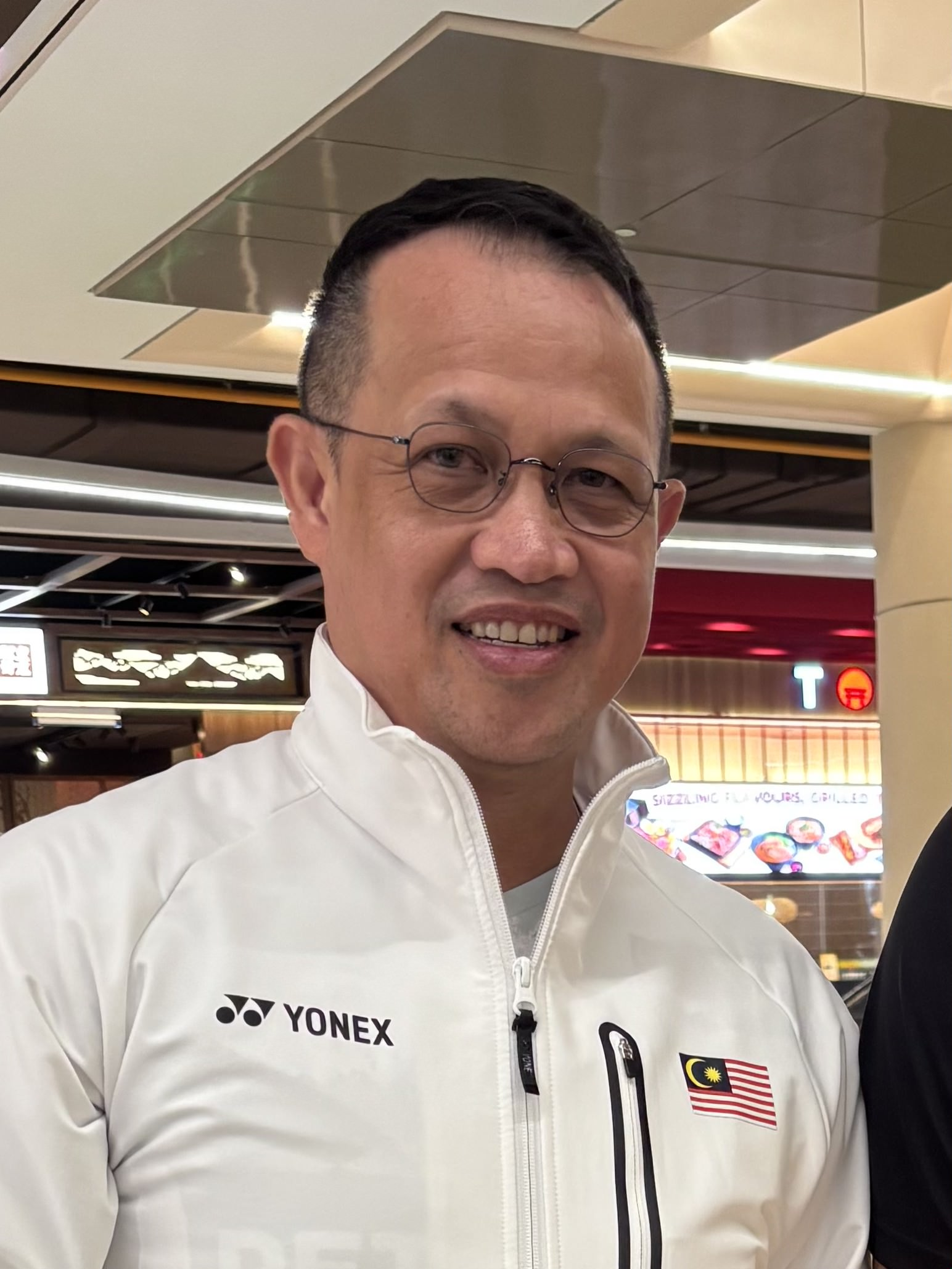
- Rexy in 2024

Personal information
- Nickname: Eky
- Born: Rexy Ronald Mainaky; 9 March 1968 (age 58) Ternate, Maluku, Indonesia
- Height: 1.73 m (5 ft 8 in)
- Weight: 70 kg (154 lb)

Sport
- Country: Indonesia
- Sport: Badminton
- Handedness: Right

Men's doubles
- Highest ranking: 1
Medal record
Men's badminton
Representing Indonesia
Olympic Games
Gold medal – first place	1996 Atlanta	Men's doubles
World Championships
Gold medal – first place	1995 Lausanne	Men's Doubles
Bronze medal – third place	1997 Glasgow	Men's Doubles
World Cup
Gold medal – first place	1993 New Delhi	Men's doubles
Gold medal – first place	1995 Jakarta	Men's doubles
Gold medal – first place	1997 Yogyakarta	Men's doubles
Silver medal – second place	1992 Guangzhou	Men's doubles
Silver medal – second place	1996 Jakarta	Men's doubles
Sudirman Cup
Silver medal – second place	1991 Copenhagen	Mixed team
Silver medal – second place	1995 Lausanne	Mixed team
Bronze medal – third place	1997 Glasgow	Mixed team
Bronze medal – third place	1999 Copenhagen	Mixed team
Thomas Cup
Gold medal – first place	1994 Jakarta	Men's team
Gold medal – first place	1996 Hong Kong	Men's team
Gold medal – first place	1998 Hong Kong	Men's team
Gold medal – first place	2000 Kuala Lumpur	Men's team
Silver medal – second place	1992 Kuala Lumpur	Men's team
Asian Games
Gold medal – first place	1994 Hiroshima	Men's doubles
Gold medal – first place	1994 Hiroshima	Men's team
Gold medal – first place	1998 Bangkok	Men's doubles
Gold medal – first place	1998 Bangkok	Men's team
Asian Championships
Gold medal – first place	1993 Hong Kong	Men's team
Gold medal – first place	2000 Jakarta	Men's doubles
Asian Cup
Gold medal – first place	1994 Beijing	Men's doubles
Silver medal – second place	1991 Jakarta	Men's doubles
SEA Games
Gold medal – first place	1993 Singapore	Men's team
Gold medal – first place	1995 Chiang Mai	Men's team
Gold medal – first place	1997 Jakarta	Men's team
Silver medal – second place	1991 Manila	Mixed doubles
Silver medal – second place	1991 Manila	Men's team
Silver medal – second place	1993 Singapore	Men's doubles
Silver medal – second place	1995 Chiang Mai	Men's doubles
Silver medal – second place	1997 Jakarta	Men's doubles
Bronze medal – third place	1991 Manila	Men's doubles
Southeast Asian Junior Championships
Gold medal – first place	1986 Singapore	Boys' singles
Gold medal – first place	1986 Singapore	Boys' doubles
Gold medal – first place	1986 Singapore	Boys' team

Rexy Ronald Mainaky (born 9 March 1968), simply known as Rexy, is an Indonesian badminton coach and former player. He was men's doubles badminton world champion who is often simply known as Rexy. He won the men's doubles Olympic gold medal in 1996 with Ricky Subagja. As of October 2021, he was appointed as the new deputy coaching director of the Badminton Association of Malaysia.

== Career ==
During the 1990s Mainaky and fellow countryman Ricky Subagja formed the most internationally successful team of the decade. Both noted for their quickness and power, Mainaky and Subagja won over thirty international titles together, including all of badminton's major championships at least once. They captured Olympic gold at Atlanta in 1996, the then biennial IBF World Championships in 1995 at Lausanne, Switzerland, and the venerable All-England Championships back to back in 1995 and 1996. A partial listing of their victories includes the China (1992), Indonesia (1993, 1994, 1998, 1999), Malaysia (1993, 1994, 1997), Korea (1995, 1996), and Denmark (1998) Opens; the World Badminton Grand Prix (1992, 1994, 1996), the Badminton World Cup (1993, 1995, 1997), and the quadrennial Asian Games (1994, 1998).

Mainaky and Subagja were bronze medalists at the 1997 IBF World Championships in Glasgow. They were eliminated in the quarterfinals at both the 1992 and 2000 Olympics. Mainaky won the 2000 Asian Badminton Championships with another Indonesian doubles maestro, Tony Gunawan. He was a member of consecutive world champion Indonesian Thomas Cup (men's international) teams in 1994, 1996, 1998, and 2000.

Five of seven children in the Mainaky family, Rexy, Richard, Marleve, Rionny and Karel, were part of the Indonesian national shuttling team in the 1990s and nowadays they still have a hand in the sport, though courtside as badminton coaches.

He is currently the doubles director of coaching of the Badminton Association of Malaysia.

== Awards and nominations ==
Award	Year	Category	Result	Ref.
Badminton World Federation Awards	2009	Badminton Hall of Fame	Honored	
Candra Wijaya International Badminton Centre Awards	2017	The best men's doubles legend with Ricky Subagja	Honored	

== Achievements ==
=== Olympic Games ===
Men's doubles
Year	Venue	Partner	Opponent	Score	Result	Ref.
1996	GSU Sports Arena, Atlanta, United States	(Indonesia) Ricky Subagja	(Malaysia) Yap Kim Hock (Malaysia) Cheah Soon Kit	5–15, 15–13, 15–12	Gold	

=== World Championships ===
Men's doubles
Year	Venue	Partner	Opponent	Score	Result
1997	Scotstoun Centre, Glasgow, Scotland	(Indonesia) Ricky Subagja	(Malaysia) Yap Kim Hock (Malaysia) Cheah Soon Kit	9–15, 15–2, 12–15	Bronze
1995	Malley Sports Centre, Lausanne, Switzerland	(Indonesia) Ricky Subagja	(Denmark) Jon Holst-Christensen (Denmark) Thomas Lund	15–5, 15–2	Gold

=== World Cup ===
Men's doubles
Year	Venue	Partner	Opponent	Score	Result
1997	Among Rogo Sports Hall, Yogyakarta, Indonesia	(Indonesia) Ricky Subagja	(South Korea) Lee Dong-soo (South Korea) Yoo Yong-sung	15–1, 10–15, 15–3	Gold
1996	Istora Senayan, Jakarta, Indonesia	(Indonesia) Sigit Budiarto	(Indonesia) Antonius Ariantho (Indonesia) Denny Kantono	8–15, 2–15	Silver
1995	Istora Senayan, Jakarta, Indonesia	(Indonesia) Ricky Subagja	(Thailand) Sakrapee Thongsari (Thailand) Pramote Teerawiwatana	15–4, 15–9	Gold
1993	Indira Gandhi Arena, New Delhi, India	(Indonesia) Ricky Subagja	(China) Chen Kang (China) Chen Hongyong	15–7, 12–15, 15–9	Gold
1992	Guangdong Gymnasium, Guangzhou, China	(Indonesia) Ricky Subagja	(Malaysia) Cheah Soon Kit (Malaysia) Soo Beng Kiang	10–15, 11–15	Silver

=== Asian Games ===
Men's doubles
Year	Venue	Partner	Opponent	Score	Result	Ref.
1994	Tsuru Memorial Gymnasium, Hiroshima, Japan	(Indonesia) Ricky Subagja	(Malaysia) Cheah Soon Kit (Malaysia) Soo Beng Kiang	15–10, 15–2	Gold	
1998	Thammasat Gymnasium 2, Bangkok, Thailand	(Indonesia) Ricky Subagja	(Thailand) Pramote Teerawiwatana (Thailand) Siripong Siripool	15–5, 15–10	Gold	

=== Asian Championships ===
Men's doubles
Year	Venue	Partner	Opponent	Score	Result
2000	Istora Senayan, Jakarta, Indonesia	(Indonesia) Tony Gunawan	(Malaysia) Choong Tan Fook (Malaysia) Lee Wan Wah	15–8, 15–9	Gold

=== Asian Cup ===
Men's doubles
Year	Venue	Partner	Opponent	Score	Result
1994	Beijing Gymnasium, Beijing, China	(Indonesia) Ricky Subagja	(Malaysia) Cheah Soon Kit (Malaysia) Soo Beng Kiang	15–8, 15–7	Gold
1991	Istora Senayan, Jakarta, Indonesia	(Indonesia) Ricky Subagja	(Malaysia) Cheah Soon Kit (Malaysia) Soo Beng Kiang	16–17, 5–15	Silver

=== SEA Games ===
Men's doubles
Year	Venue	Partner	Opponent	Score	Result
1997	Asia-Africa hall, Gelora Bung Karno Sports Complex; Jakarta, Indonesia	(Indonesia) Ricky Subagja	(Indonesia) Sigit Budiarto (Indonesia) Candra Wijaya	4–15, 17–14, 11–15	Silver
1995	Gymnasium 3, 700th Anniversary Sport Complex; Chiang Mai, Thailand	(Indonesia) Ricky Subagja	(Malaysia) Yap Kim Hock (Malaysia) Cheah Soon Kit	13–15, 9–15	Silver
1993	Singapore Badminton Hall; Singapore	(Indonesia) Ricky Subagja	(Malaysia) Cheah Soon Kit (Malaysia) Soo Beng Kiang	7–15, 15–11, 7–15	Silver
1991	Camp Crame Gymnasium; Manila, Philippines	(Indonesia) Ricky Subagja	(Malaysia) Jalani Sidek (Malaysia) Razif Sidek	6–15, 15–12, 6–15	Bronze

Mixed doubles
Year	Venue	Partner	Opponent	Score	Result
1991	Camp Crame Gymnasium; Manila, Philippines	(Indonesia) Erma Sulistianingsih	(Indonesia) Ricky Subagja (Indonesia) Rosiana Tendean	6–15, 13–15	Silver

=== IBF World Grand Prix (27 titles, 9 runners-up) ===
The World Badminton Grand Prix sanctioned by International Badminton Federation (IBF) since 1983.

Men's doubles
Year	Tournament	Partner	Opponent	Score	Result
2000	Korea Open	(Indonesia) Ricky Subagja	(South Korea) Lee Dong-soo (South Korea) Yoo Yong-sung	8–15, 15–9, 4–15	(silver) Runner-up
1999	Indonesia Open	(Indonesia) Ricky Subagja	(Indonesia) Tony Gunawan (Indonesia) Candra Wijaya	15–12, 15–8	(gold) Winner
1998	Indonesia Open	(Indonesia) Ricky Subagja	(Indonesia) Flandy Limpele (Indonesia) Eng Hian	15–5, 15–4	(gold) Winner
1998	Denmark Open	(Indonesia) Ricky Subagja	(Indonesia) Flandy Limpele (Indonesia) Eng Hian	15–11, 15–6	(gold) Winner
1998	Singapore Open	(Indonesia) Ricky Subagja	(Indonesia) Sigit Budiarto (Indonesia) Candra Wijaya	5–15, 5–15	(silver) Runner-up
1997	Vietnam Open	(Indonesia) Ricky Subagja	(South Korea) Lee Dong-soo (South Korea) Yoo Yong-sung	15–11, 15–5	(gold) Winner
1997	Malaysia Open	(Indonesia) Ricky Subagja	(Indonesia) Antonius Ariantho (Indonesia) Denny Kantono	17–15, 15–12	(gold) Winner
1997	Japan Open	(Indonesia) Ricky Subagja	(Indonesia) Antonius Ariantho (Indonesia) Denny Kantono	15–11, 7–15, 15–7	(gold) Winner
1996	World Grand Prix Finals	(Indonesia) Ricky Subagja	(Malaysia) Yap Kim Hock (Malaysia) Cheah Soon Kit	15–4, 15–9	(gold) Winner
1996	China Open	(Indonesia) Ricky Subagja	(Indonesia) Sigit Budiarto (Indonesia) Candra Wijaya	12–15, 5–15	(silver) Runner-up
1996	All England Open	(Indonesia) Ricky Subagja	(Malaysia) Yap Kim Hock (Malaysia) Cheah Soon Kit	15–6, 15–5	(gold) Winner
1996	Korea Open	(Indonesia) Ricky Subagja	(Malaysia) Yap Kim Hock (Malaysia) Cheah Soon Kit	15–5, 17–14	(gold) Winner
1996	Japan Open	(Indonesia) Ricky Subagja	(Indonesia) Rudy Gunawan (Indonesia) Bambang Suprianto	15–8, 12–15, 15–12	(gold) Winner
1995	Singapore Open	(Indonesia) Ricky Subagja	(Indonesia) Antonius Ariantho (Indonesia) Denny Kantono	15–7, 18–16	(gold) Winner
1995	All England Open	(Indonesia) Ricky Subagja	(Indonesia) Antonius Ariantho (Indonesia) Denny Kantono	15–12, 15–18, 15–8	(gold) Winner
1995	Japan Open	(Indonesia) Ricky Subagja	(Indonesia) Rudy Gunawan (Indonesia) Bambang Suprianto	15–8, 15–9	(gold) Winner
1995	Korea Open	(Indonesia) Ricky Subagja	(Denmark) Jon Holst-Christensen (Denmark) Thomas Lund	15–6, 11–15, 15–7	(gold) Winner
1994	World Grand Prix Finals	(Indonesia) Ricky Subagja	(Indonesia) Rudy Gunawan (Indonesia) Bambang Suprianto	15–10, 15–7	(gold) Winner
1994	Hong Kong Open	(Indonesia) Ricky Subagja	(Indonesia) Rudy Gunawan (Indonesia) Bambang Suprianto	15–12, 14–17, 15–7	(gold) Winner
1994	Indonesia Open	(Indonesia) Ricky Subagja	(Indonesia) Rudy Gunawan (Indonesia) Bambang Suprianto	10–15, 15–4, 18–17	(gold) Winner
1994	Singapore Open	(Indonesia) Ricky Subagja	(Denmark) Jon Holst-Christensen (Denmark) Thomas Lund	15–6, 15–8	(gold) Winner
1994	Malaysia Open	(Indonesia) Ricky Subagja	(Thailand) Sakrapee Thongsari (Thailand) Pramote Teerawiwatana	15–5, 18–16	(gold) Winner
1994	All England Open	(Indonesia) Ricky Subagja	(Indonesia) Rudy Gunawan (Indonesia) Bambang Suprianto	12–15, 12–15	(silver) Runner-up
1994	Swedish Open	(Indonesia) Ricky Subagja	(Sweden) Peter Axelsson (Sweden) Pär-Gunnar Jönsson	15–11, 15–12	(gold) Winner
1993	World Grand Prix Finals	(Indonesia) Ricky Subagja	(Indonesia) Rudy Gunawan (Indonesia) Bambang Suprianto	15–11, 10–15, 9–15	(silver) Runner-up
1993	German Open	(Indonesia) Ricky Subagja	(Denmark) Jon Holst-Christensen (Denmark) Thomas Lund	14–17, 12–15	(silver) Runner-up
1993	Indonesia Open	(Indonesia) Ricky Subagja	(Indonesia) Eddy Hartono (Indonesia) Richard Mainaky	15–13 15–10	(gold) Winner
1993	Malaysia Open	(Indonesia) Ricky Subagja	(Malaysia) Cheah Soon Kit (Malaysia) Soo Beng Kiang	15–7, 15–5	(gold) Winner
1993	Swedish Open	(Indonesia) Ricky Subagja	(Sweden) Peter Axelsson (Sweden) Pär-Gunnar Jönsson	15–12, 15–10	(gold) Winner
1992	World Grand Prix Finals	(Indonesia) Ricky Subagja	(Malaysia) Cheah Soon Kit (Malaysia) Soo Beng Kiang	15–11, 15–6	(gold) Winner
1992	Thailand Open	(Indonesia) Ricky Subagja	(China) Huang Zhanzhong (China) Zheng Yumin	15–9, 12–15, 15–11	(gold) Winner
1992	Hong Kong Open	(Indonesia) Ricky Subagja	(China) Huang Zhanzhong (China) Zheng Yumin	15–13, 15–10	(gold) Winner
1992	China Open	(Indonesia) Ricky Subagja	(Malaysia) Razif Sidek (Malaysia) Jalani Sidek	17–15, 15–11	(gold) Winner
1992	Indonesia Open	(Indonesia) Ricky Subagja	(Indonesia) Eddy Hartono (Indonesia) Rudy Gunawan	12–15, 5–15	(silver) Runner-up
1991	U.S. Open	(Indonesia) Ricky Subagja	(Malaysia) Razif Sidek (Malaysia) Jalani Sidek	13–18, 15–13, 3–15	(silver) Runner-up
1991	Canadian Open	(Indonesia) Ricky Subagja	(Malaysia) Razif Sidek (Malaysia) Jalani Sidek	11–15, 12–15	(silver) Runner-up

IBF Grand Prix tournament
IBF Grand Prix Finals tournament

=== IBF International (1 runner-up) ===
Men's doubles
Year	Tournament	Partner	Opponent	Score	Result
1992	French Open	(Indonesia) Ricky Subagja	(China) Li Yongbo (China) Tian Bingyi	16–18, 12–15	(silver) Runner-up

== Post-playing career ==
Mainaky is known amongst his peers and colleagues, and the game's fans, as a notable doubles player, alongside players such as Christian Hadinata, Tjun Tjun, Johan Wahjudi, Liem Swie King, Ricky Subagja, Tony Gunawan, Hendra Setiawan, Park Joo Bong, Kim Dong Moon, Fu Haifeng, Cai Yun, and Finn Kobbero. He has also worked as a badminton coach, alongside former player Park Joo Bong of Korea (currently head coach of Japanese badminton squad). He has participated in charity badminton exhibition through badminton, by playing in exhibitions across Asia and Europe post-competitive career. He was the coach to English badminton mixed doubles' pair Gail Emms and Nathan Robertson and coached them to win 2004 Summer Olympic silver medal, 2005 All England Open Badminton Championships and 2006 IBF World Championships titles.

Mainaky became a coach after his playing career. He coached the Malaysian National Team's Doubles department and his biggest success was bringing up Koo Kien Keat and Tan Boon Heong. He guided the pair to an Asian Games Gold Medal in Doha 2006. However, there was rumours about a fall out between Koo Kien Keat and Tan Boon Heong with Rexy as the pair requested for a change of coaches. Subsequently, he left the Badminton Association of Malaysia in 2012 after seven years and joined the Philippines Badminton Association as head coach. After about a year he left the Philippines Badminton Association and returned to his homeland Indonesia. He became Indonesia's high performance director and was basically the head of the Indonesia Badminton Team. He is currently still serving as the High performance director for Indonesia. In 2017, Mainaky left his position at Badminton Association of Indonesia (PBSI) to join Thailand Badminton Association (BAT). In 2018, Mainaky led the Thai women's team reached the Uber Cup final for the first time in their history.

== Sources ==
- (in Indonesian)

Olympic Games
Preceded by Hendrik Simangunsong	Flagbearer for Indonesia; 2000 Sydney	Succeeded by Christian Hadinata
