= Cheah Soon Kit =

Malaysian badminton player (born 1968)

Cheah Soon Kit 谢勋寁
Personal information
- Born: 9 January 1968 (age 58) Ipoh, Perak, Malaysia
- Years active: 1986–2000
- Height: 1.80 m (5 ft 11 in)
- Weight: 73 kg (161 lb)

Sport
- Country: Malaysia
- Sport: Badminton
- Handedness: Right

Men's doubles
- Highest ranking: 1 (1992)
Medal record
Men's badminton
Representing Malaysia
Olympic Games
| Silver medal – second place | 1996 Atlanta | Men's doubles |
World Championships
| Silver medal – second place | 1993 Birmingham | Men's doubles |
| Silver medal – second place | 1997 Glasgow | Men's doubles |
| Bronze medal – third place | 1995 Lausanne | Men's doubles |
World Cup
| Gold medal – first place | 1992 Guangzhou | Men's doubles |
| Gold medal – first place | 1994 Ho Chi Minh | Men's doubles |
| Bronze medal – third place | 1990 Jakarta | Men's doubles |
| Bronze medal – third place | 1993 New Delhi | Men's doubles |
| Bronze medal – third place | 1995 Jakarta | Men's doubles |
| Bronze medal – third place | 1996 Jakarta | Men's doubles |
Thomas Cup
| Gold medal – first place | 1992 Kuala Lumpur | Team |
| Silver medal – second place | 1988 Kuala Lumpur | Team |
| Silver medal – second place | 1990 Tokyo | Team |
| Silver medal – second place | 1994 Jakarta | Team |
| Silver medal – second place | 1998 Hong Kong | Team |
| Bronze medal – third place | 1986 Jakarta | Team |
Commonwealth Games
| Gold medal – first place | 1994 Victoria | Men's doubles |
| Gold medal – first place | 1998 Kuala Lumpur | Men's team |
| Silver medal – second place | 1990 Auckland | Men's doubles |
| Silver medal – second place | 1994 Victoria | Mixed team |
| Silver medal – second place | 1998 Kuala Lumpur | Men's doubles |
Asian Games
| Silver medal – second place | 1990 Beijing | Men's team |
| Silver medal – second place | 1994 Hiroshima | Men's doubles |
| Bronze medal – third place | 1994 Hiroshima | Men's team |
Asian Championships
| Gold medal – first place | 1995 Beijing | Men's doubles |
| Bronze medal – third place | 1989 Shanghai | Men's team |
| Bronze medal – third place | 1991 Kuala Lumpur | Men's doubles |
| Bronze medal – third place | 1999 Kuala Lumpur | Men's doubles |
| Bronze medal – third place | 1993 Hong Kong | Men's team |
Asian Cup
| Gold medal – first place | 1991 Jakarta | Men's doubles |
| Silver medal – second place | 1994 Beijing | Men's doubles |
| Silver medal – second place | 1995 Qingdao | Men's doubles |
Southeast Asian Games
| Gold medal – first place | 1989 Kuala Lumpur | Men's team |
| Gold medal – first place | 1991 Manila | Men's team |
| Gold medal – first place | 1993 Singapore | Men's doubles |
| Gold medal – first place | 1995 Chiang Mai | Men's doubles |
| Silver medal – second place | 1987 Jakarta | Men's team |
| Silver medal – second place | 1993 Singapore | Men's team |
| Silver medal – second place | 1995 Chiang Mai | Men's team |
| Silver medal – second place | 1997 Jakarta | Men's team |
| Bronze medal – third place | 1989 Kuala Lumpur | Mixed doubles |
| Bronze medal – third place | 1991 Manila | Men's doubles |

Cheah Soon Kit
- Traditional Chinese: 謝順吉
- Simplified Chinese: 谢顺吉
Transcriptions
Standard Mandarin
- Hanyu Pinyin: Xiè Shùnjí
Yue: Cantonese
- Jyutping: Ze6 Seon6 Gat1
Southern Min
- Hokkien POJ: Chiā Sūn-kiat

Datuk Cheah Soon Kit (Current name: Chinese: 謝勛寁; Jyutping: Ze6 Fan1 Zaam2; Pe̍h-ōe-jī: Chiā Hun-chám / Birth name: Chinese: 謝順吉; Jyutping: Ze6 Seon6 Gat1; Pe̍h-ōe-jī: Chiā Sūn-kiat) PMW KMN BSD (born 9 January 1968) is a Malaysian badminton player and coach.

== Career ==
Soon Kit was won the Olympic silver with Yap Kim Hock in Atlanta 1996. Before combining with Kim Hock, Soon Kit’s partner was Soo Beng Kiang and they won numerous international titles, including the 1992 and 1994 World Cup. He was also a vital member of the Malaysian squad that won the Thomas Cup for the first time in 25 years, in a 3-2 victory over Indonesia at the Stadium Negara in 1992.

== Coaching ==
Soon Kit was the national women’s doubles coach from 2001 to 2007. He groomed Wong Pei Tty-Chin Eei Hui into the country’s top pair. Pei Tty-Eei Hui bagged the SEA Games gold in Manila in 2005 to end a 30-year title drought. They also won the gold at the 2006 Commonwealth Games in Melbourne. After becoming the head coach for several minor badminton clubs, Soon Kit rejoined the national set-up in 2016 before heading the men’s doubles department in 2017 and was instrumental in grooming the current Malaysia No.1 Aaron Chia-Soh Wooi Yik. He left the national setup at the end of 2018.

== Achievements ==
=== Olympic Games ===
Men's doubles
| Year | Venue | Partner | Opponent | Score | Result |
|---|---|---|---|---|---|
| 1996 | GSU Sports Arena, Atlanta, United States | (Malaysia) Yap Kim Hock | (Indonesia) Rexy Mainaky (Indonesia) Ricky Subagja | 15–5, 13–15, 12–15 | Silver |

=== World Championships ===
Men's doubles
| Year | Venue | Partner | Opponent | Score | Result |
|---|---|---|---|---|---|
| 1993 | National Indoor Arena, Birmingham, England | (Malaysia) Soo Beng Kiang | (Indonesia) Rudy Gunawan (Indonesia) Ricky Subagja | 11–15, 3–15 | Silver |
| 1995 | Malley Sports Centre, Lausanne, Switzerland | (Malaysia) Yap Kim Hock | (Indonesia) Rexy Mainaky (Indonesia) Ricky Subagja | 8–15, 6–15 | Bronze |
| 1997 | Scotstoun Centre, Glasgow, Scotland | (Malaysia) Yap Kim Hock | (Indonesia) Sigit Budiarto (Indonesia) Candra Wijaya | 15–8, 17–18, 7–15 | Silver |

=== World Cup ===
Men's doubles
| Year | Venue | Partner | Opponent | Score | Result |
|---|---|---|---|---|---|
| 1990 | Istora Senayan, Jakarta, Indonesia | (Malaysia) Soo Beng Kiang | (Indonesia) Eddy Hartono (Indonesia) Rudy Gunawan | 13–18, 13–18 | Bronze |
| 1992 | Guangdong Gymnasium, Guangzhou, China | (Malaysia) Soo Beng Kiang | (Indonesia) Rexy Mainaky (Indonesia) Ricky Subagja | 15–10, 15–11 | Gold |
| 1993 | Indira Gandhi Arena, New Delhi, India | (Malaysia) Soo Beng Kiang | (Indonesia) Rexy Mainaky (Indonesia) Ricky Subagja | 9–15, 11–15 | Bronze |
| 1994 | Phan Đình Phùng Indoor Stadium, Ho Chi Minh City, Vietnam | (Malaysia) Soo Beng Kiang | (Indonesia) Rudy Gunawan (Indonesia) Bambang Suprianto | 18–13, 2–15, 17–16 | Gold |
| 1995 | Istora Senayan, Jakarta, Indonesia | (Malaysia) Yap Kim Hock | (Indonesia) Rexy Mainaky (Indonesia) Ricky Subagja | 13–18, 9–15 | Bronze |
| 1996 | Istora Senayan, Jakarta, Indonesia | (Malaysia) Yap Kim Hock | (Indonesia) Antonius Ariantho (Indonesia) Denny Kantono | 11–15, 15–3, 13–15 | Bronze |

=== Commonwealth Games ===
Men's doubles
| Year | Venue | Partner | Opponent | Score | Result |
|---|---|---|---|---|---|
| 1990 | Auckland Badminton Hall, Auckland, New Zealand | (Malaysia) Rashid Sidek | (Malaysia) Jalani Sidek (Malaysia) Razif Sidek | 8–15, 8–15 | Silver |
| 1994 | McKinnon Gym, University of Victoria, Victoria, Canada | (Malaysia) Soo Beng Kiang | (England) Simon Archer (England) Chris Hunt | 15–10, 15–9 | Gold |
| 1998 | Kuala Lumpur Badminton Stadium, Kuala Lumpur, Malaysia | (Malaysia) Yap Kim Hock | (Malaysia) Choong Tan Fook (Malaysia) Lee Wan Wah | 7–15, 4–15 | Silver |

=== Asian Games ===
Men's doubles
| Year | Venue | Partner | Opponent | Score | Result |
|---|---|---|---|---|---|
| 1994 | Tsuru Memorial Gymnasium, Hiroshima, Japan | (Malaysia) Soo Beng Kiang | (Indonesia) Rexy Mainaky (Indonesia) Ricky Subagja | 10–15, 2–15 | Silver |

=== Asian Championships ===
Men's doubles
| Year | Venue | Partner | Opponent | Score | Result |
|---|---|---|---|---|---|
| 1991 | Cheras Indoor Stadium, Kuala Lumpur, Malaysia | (Malaysia) Soo Beng Kiang | (South Korea) Park Joo-bong (South Korea) Kim Moon-soo | 7–15, 7–15 | Bronze |
| 1995 | Olympic Sports Center Gymnasium, Beijing, China | (Malaysia) Yap Kim Hock | (China) Huang Zhanzhong (China) Jiang Xin | 7–15, 15–8, 15–7 | Gold |
| 1999 | Kuala Lumpur Badminton Stadium, Kuala Lumpur, Malaysia | (Malaysia) Yap Kim Hock | (China) Zhang Jun (China) Zhang Wei | 16–17, 8–15 | Bronze |

=== Asian Cup ===
Men's doubles
| Year | Venue | Partner | Opponent | Score | Result |
|---|---|---|---|---|---|
| 1991 | Istora Senayan, Jakarta, Indonesia | (Malaysia) Soo Beng Kiang | (Indonesia) Rexy Mainaky (Indonesia) Ricky Subagja | 17–16, 15–5 | Gold |
| 1994 | Beijing Gymnasium, Beijing, China | (Malaysia) Soo Beng Kiang | (Indonesia) Rexy Mainaky (Indonesia) Ricky Subagja | 8–15, 7–15 | Silver |
| 1995 | Xinxing Gymnasium, Qingdao, China | (Malaysia) Yap Kim Hock | (China) Huang Zhanzhong (China) Jiang Xin | 10–15, 11–15 | Silver |

=== Southeast Asian Games ===
Men's doubles
| Year | Venue | Partner | Opponent | Score | Result |
|---|---|---|---|---|---|
| 1991 | Camp Crame Gymnasium, Manila, Philippines | (Malaysia) Soo Beng Kiang | (Indonesia) Rudy Gunawan (Indonesia) Eddy Hartono | 7–15, 3–15 | Bronze |
| 1993 | Singapore Badminton Hall, Singapore | (Malaysia) Soo Beng Kiang | (Indonesia) Rexy Mainaky (Indonesia) Ricky Subagja | 15–7, 11–15, 15–7 | Gold |
| 1995 | Gymnasium 3, 700th Anniversary Sport Complex; Chiang Mai, Thailand | (Malaysia) Yap Kim Hock | (Indonesia) Rexy Mainaky (Indonesia) Ricky Subagja | 15–13, 15–9 | Gold |

Mixed doubles
| Year | Venue | Partner | Opponent | Score | Result |
|---|---|---|---|---|---|
| 1989 | Stadium Negara, Kuala Lumpur, Malaysia | (Malaysia) Tan Sui Hoon | (Indonesia) Aryono Miranat (Indonesia) Minarti Timur | 14–18, 1–15 | Bronze |

=== IBF World Grand Prix ===
The World Badminton Grand Prix sanctioned by International Badminton Federation (IBF) from 1983 to 2006.

Men's doubles
| Year | Tournament | Partner | Opponent | Score | Result |
|---|---|---|---|---|---|
| 1988 | Swiss Open | (Malaysia) Ong Beng Teong | (Malaysia) Ong Ewe Chye (Malaysia) Rahman Sidek | 15–9, 15–6 | (gold) Winner |
| 1988 | Poona Open | (Malaysia) Ong Beng Teong | (Denmark) Michael Kjeldsen (Denmark) Jens Peter Nierhoff | 10–15, 15–10, 6–15 | (silver) Runner-up |
| 1989 | Swiss Open | (Malaysia) Ong Beng Teong | (China) Zhang Qiang (China) Zhou Jincan | 15–9, 5–15, 15–7 | (gold) Winner |
| 1989 | Thailand Open | (Malaysia) Razif Sidek | (South Korea) Kim Moon-soo (South Korea) Park Joo-bong | 11–15, 3–15 | (silver) Runner-up |
| 1990 | World Grand Prix Finals | (Malaysia) Soo Beng Kiang | (Indonesia) Rudy Gunawan (Indonesia) Eddy Hartono | 6–15, 8–15 | (silver) Runner-up |
| 1991 | Chinese Taipei Open | (Malaysia) Soo Beng Kiang | (Malaysia) Jalani Sidek (Malaysia) Razif Sidek | 7–15, 5–15 | (silver) Runner-up |
| 1991 | Swedish Open | (Malaysia) Soo Beng Kiang | (Denmark) Jon Holst-Christensen (Denmark) Thomas Lund | 18–14, 15–7 | (gold) Winner |
| 1991 | Thailand Open | (Malaysia) Soo Beng Kiang | (Indonesia) Rudy Gunawan (Indonesia) Eddy Hartono | 3–15, 11–15 | (silver) Runner-up |
| 1992 | Chinese Taipei Open | (Malaysia) Soo Beng Kiang | (Malaysia) Jalani Sidek (Malaysia) Tan Kim Her | 15–7, 15–4 | (gold) Winner |
| 1992 | Malaysia Open | (Malaysia) Soo Beng Kiang | (China) Chen Hongyong (China) Chen Kang | 15–12, 15–7 | (gold) Winner |
| 1992 | Canada Open | (Malaysia) Soo Beng Kiang | (South Korea) Ahn Jae-chang (South Korea) Choi Ji-tae | 15–4, 15–4 | (gold) Winner |
| 1992 | US Open | (Malaysia) Soo Beng Kiang | (Denmark) Thomas Lund (Sweden) Jens Olsson | 15–9, 15–11 | (gold) Winner |
| 1992 | World Grand Prix Finals | (Malaysia) Soo Beng Kiang | (Indonesia) Rexy Mainaky (Indonesia) Ricky Subagja | 11–15, 6–15 | (silver) Runner-up |
| 1993 | Chinese Taipei Open | (Malaysia) Soo Beng Kiang | (Indonesia) Imay Hendra (Indonesia) Bagus Setiadi | 15–3, 15–12 | (gold) Winner |
| 1993 | Malaysia Open | (Malaysia) Soo Beng Kiang | (Indonesia) Rexy Mainaky (Indonesia) Ricky Subagja | 7–15, 5–15 | (silver) Runner-up |
| 1993 | Dutch Open | (Malaysia) Soo Beng Kiang | (China) Jiang Xin (China) Yu Qi | 15–4, 17–14 | (gold) Winner |
| 1995 | Malaysia Open | (Malaysia) Yap Kim Hock | (Thailand) Pramote Teerawiwatana (Thailand) Sakrapee Thongsari | 15–5, 12–15, 5–15 | (silver) Runner-up |
| 1995 | Thailand Open | (Malaysia) Yap Kim Hock | (China) Huang Zhanzhong (China) Jiang Xin | 9–15, 11–15 | (silver) Runner-up |
| 1995 | World Grand Prix Finals | (Malaysia) Yap Kim Hock | (Indonesia) Rudy Gunawan (Indonesia) Bambang Suprianto | 13–18, 15–2, 15–12 | (gold) Winner |
| 1996 | Korea Open | (Malaysia) Yap Kim Hock | (Indonesia) Rexy Mainaky (Indonesia) Ricky Subagja | 5–15, 14–15 | (silver) Runner-up |
| 1996 | All England Open | (Malaysia) Yap Kim Hock | (Indonesia) Rexy Mainaky (Indonesia) Ricky Subagja | 6–15, 5–15 | (silver) Runner-up |
| 1996 | Malaysia Open | (Malaysia) Yap Kim Hock | (Malaysia) Choong Tan Fook (Malaysia) Lee Wan Wah | 15–5, 15–3 | (gold) Winner |
| 1996 | US Open | (Malaysia) Yap Kim Hock | (Indonesia) Sigit Budiarto (Indonesia) Candra Wijaya | 16–18, 10–15 | (silver) Runner-up |
| 1996 | Hong Kong Open | (Malaysia) Yap Kim Hock | (Indonesia) Antonius Ariantho (Indonesia) Denny Kantono | 6–15, 3–15 | (silver) Runner-up |
| 1996 | World Grand Prix Finals | (Malaysia) Yap Kim Hock | (Indonesia) Rexy Mainaky (Indonesia) Ricky Subagja | 4–15, 9–15 | (silver) Runner-up |
| 1997 | Korea Open | (Malaysia) Yap Kim Hock | (South Korea) Ha Tae-kwon (South Korea) Kang Kyung-jin | 15–4, 13–15, 5–15 | (silver) Runner-up |
| 1997 | World Grand Prix Finals | (Malaysia) Yap Kim Hock | (Indonesia) Sigit Budiarto (Indonesia) Candra Wijaya | 15–17, 15–11, 5–15 | (silver) Runner-up |
| 1998 | Japan Open | (Malaysia) Yap Kim Hock | (Indonesia) Antonius Ariantho (Indonesia) Denny Kantono | 15–9, 15–7 | (gold) Winner |
| 1998 | Dutch Open | (Malaysia) Choong Tan Fook | (Sweden) Peter Axelsson (Sweden) Pär-Gunnar Jönsson | 15–11, 15–9 | (gold) Winner |
| 1999 | Chinese Taipei Open | (Malaysia) Choong Tan Fook | (Indonesia) Antonius Ariantho (Indonesia) Denny Kantono | 4–15, 17–14, 8–15 | (silver) Runner-up |
| 1999 | Hong Kong Open | (Malaysia) Yap Kim Hock | (Indonesia) Sigit Budiarto (Indonesia) Halim Haryanto | 15–12, 15–12 | (gold) Winner |
| 2000 | Chinese Taipei Open | (Malaysia) Yap Kim Hock | (Indonesia) Tony Gunawan (Indonesia) Candra Wijaya | 7–15, 7–15 | (silver) Runner-up |

== Honours ==
- Malaysia:
  - Herald of the Order of Loyalty to the Royal Family of Malaysia (B.S.D.) (1988)
  - Officer of the Order of the Defender of the Realm (K.M.N.) (1992)
- Federal Territory:
  - Commander of the Order of the Territorial Crown (P.M.W.) – Datuk (2021)
