= Diving at the 2004 Summer Olympics – Men's 10 metre platform =

Men's 10 metre platform at the Games of the XXVIII Olympiad

Medalists
1st place, gold medalist(s)		Hu Jia	China
2nd place, silver medalist(s)		Mathew Helm	Australia
3rd place, bronze medalist(s)		Tian Liang	China

The men's 10 metre platform was one of eight diving events included in the Diving at the 2004 Summer Olympics programme.

The competition was split into three phases:

Preliminary round
27 August — Each diver performed a front dive, a back dive, a reverse dive, an inward dive, a twisting dive and an armstand dive. There were no limitations in degree of difficulty. The 18 divers with the highest total score advanced to the semi-final.
Semi-final
28 August — Each diver performed four dives out of a group consisting of a front dive, a back dive, a reverse dive, an inward dive, a twisting dive and an armstand dive. The 12 divers with the highest combined score from the semi-final and preliminary dives advanced to the final.
Final
28 August — Each diver performed a front dive, a back dive, a reverse dive, an inward dive, a twisting dive and an armstand dive, all limited in difficulty degree. The final ranking was determined by the combined score from the final and semi-final dives.

== Results ==
Rank	Diver	Nation	Preliminary		Semifinal				Final		
Rank	Diver	Nation	Points	Rank	Points	Rank	Total	Rank	Points	Rank	Total
1st place, gold medalist(s)	Hu Jia	China	463.44	6	207.30	4	670.74	4	540.78	1	748.08
2nd place, silver medalist(s)	Mathew Helm	Australia	513.06	1	209.34	2	722.40	1	521.22	2	730.56
3rd place, bronze medalist(s)	Tian Liang	China	481.47	3	209.04	3	690.51	3	520.62	3	729.66
4	Alexandre Despatie	Canada	500.55	2	209.46	1	710.01	2	498.00	4	707.46
5	Peter Waterfield	Great Britain	474.03	4	180.51	13	654.54	6	488.73	5	669.24
6	Leon Taylor	Great Britain	433.38	11	195.09	5	628.47	9	468.03	6	663.12
7	Heiko Meyer	Germany	440.85	9	184.35	8	625.20	10	462.21	7	646.56
8	Robert Newbery	Australia	461.91	7	193.98	6	655.89	5	446.67	8	640.65
9	Francesco Dell'uomo	Italy	426.12	14	184.29	9	610.41	12	444.48	9	628.77
10	Rommel Pacheco	Mexico	463.47	5	182.79	10	646.26	7	440.61	10	623.40
11	Dmitry Dobroskok	Russia	445.68	8	189.87	7	635.55	8	432.36	11	622.23
12	Juan Urán	Colombia	439.77	10	177.27	16	617.04	11	428.19	12	605.46
13	Gleb Galperin	Russia	427.68	13	179.94	14	607.62	13	did not advance		
14	Christopher Kalec	Canada	429.72	12	177.12	17	606.84	14	did not advance		
15	Choe Hyong-gil	North Korea	419.58	16	180.78	12	600.36	15	did not advance		
16	Anton Zakharov	Ukraine	420.30	15	175.77	18	596.07	16	did not advance		
17	Pak Yong-ryong	North Korea	414.33	17	181.68	11	596.01	17	did not advance		
18	Tony Adam	Germany	411.30	18	178.35	15	589.65	18	did not advance		
19	Bryan Nickson Lomas	Malaysia	407.13	19	did not advance						
20	Massimiliano Mazzucchi	Italy	405.18	20	did not advance						
21	Roman Volod'kov	Ukraine	403.59	21	did not advance						
22	Ioannis Gavriilidis	Greece	395.34	22	did not advance						
23	Caesar Garcia	United States	388.77	23	did not advance						
24	Cassius Duran	Brazil	387.75	24	did not advance						
25	José Guerra	Cuba	375.87	25	did not advance						
26	Sotirios Trakas	Greece	361.56	26	did not advance						
27	Aliaksandr Varlamau	Belarus	361.41	27	did not advance						
28	Erick Fornaris	Cuba	351.75	28	did not advance						
29	Kyle Prandi	United States	346.53	29	did not advance						
30	Andrey Mamontov	Belarus	338.55	30	did not advance						
31	Jean Romain Delaloye	Switzerland	326.82	31	did not advance						
32	Hugo Parisi	Brazil	325.08	32	did not advance						
33	András Hajnal	Hungary	305.79	33	did not advance						

== Sources ==
- "Diving Results". Athens 2004 Summer Olympics. Yahoo!.
