= Russia at the 2008 Summer Olympics =

- IOC code: RUS
- NOC: Russian Olympic Committee
- Website: www.olympic.ru (in Russian)

in Beijing
- Competitors: 455 in 23 sports
- Flag bearers: Andrei Kirilenko (opening); Andrey Silnov (closing)
- Medals Ranked 3rd: Gold 24 Silver 13 Bronze 23 Total 60

Summer Olympics appearances (overview)
- 1996; 2000; 2004; 2008; 2012; 2016; 2020–2024; 2028

Other related appearances
- Russian Empire (1900–1912); Soviet Union (1952–1988); Unified Team (1992); ROC (2020); Individual Neutral Athletes (2024)

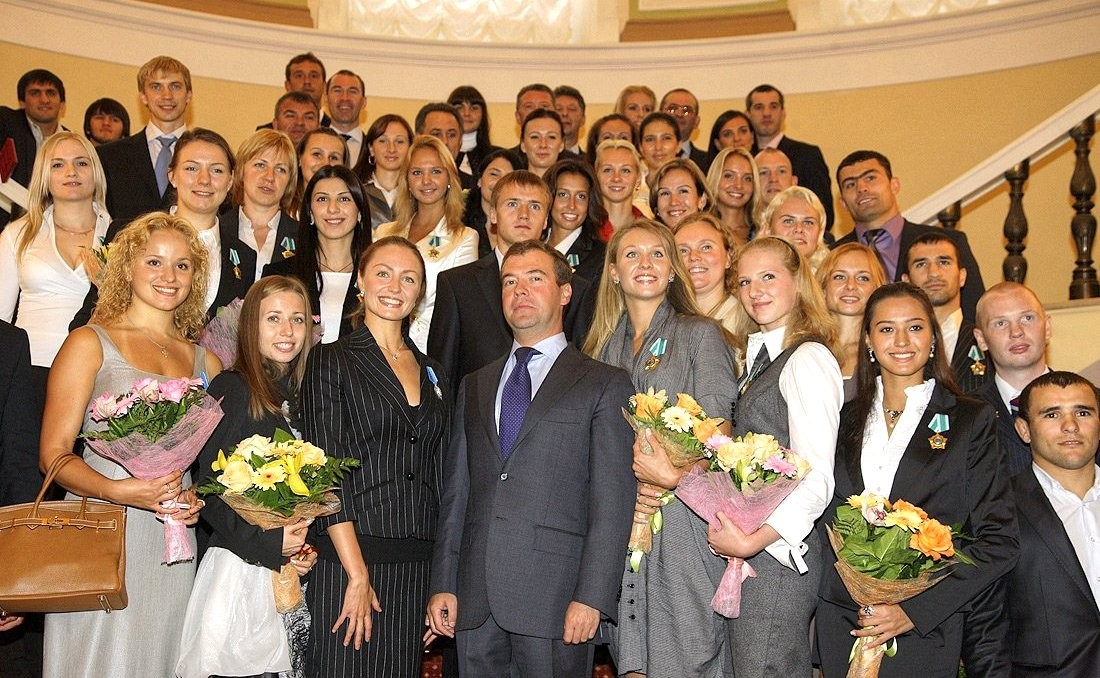
Russian president Dmitry Medvedev with Russian medallists in the Kremlin in September 2008.

The Russian Federation competed at the 2008 Summer Olympics, held in Beijing, China, represented by the Russian Olympic Committee. Russia competed in all sports except baseball, field hockey, football, softball, and taekwondo. It ranked third in the medal table by the number of gold (24) and overall (60) medals. Russia also had 14 medals stripped for doping violations, the most of any nation at the 2008 Olympics, although in terms of gold medals it got a net positive of +1 (from 23 to 24).

== Medalists ==
Medal	Name	Sport	Event
Gold	Nazyr Mankiev	Wrestling	Men's Greco-Roman 55 kg
Gold	Islambek Albiev	Wrestling	Men's Greco-Roman 60 kg
Gold	Aslanbek Khushtov	Wrestling	Men's Greco-Roman 96 kg
Gold	Valeriy Borchin	Athletics	Men's 20 km walk
Gold	Svetlana Boyko; Aida Shanayeva; Yevgeniya Lamonova; Viktoria Nikishina	Fencing	Women's team foil
Gold	Elena Dementieva	Tennis	Women's singles
Gold	Gulnara Samitova-Galkina	Athletics	Women's 3000 m steeplechase
Gold	Yelena Isinbayeva	Athletics	Women's pole vault
Gold	Mavlet Batirov	Wrestling	Men's freestyle 60 kg
Gold	Andrey Silnov	Athletics	Men's high jump
Gold	Larisa Ilchenko	Swimming	Women's 10 km open water
Gold	Anastasia Davydova; Anastasiya Yermakova	Synchronized swimming	Women's duet
Gold	Buvaisar Saitiev	Wrestling	Men's freestyle 74 kg
Gold	Olga Kaniskina	Athletics	Women's 20 km walk
Gold	Shirvani Muradov	Wrestling	Men's freestyle 96 kg
Gold	Andrey Moiseev	Modern pentathlon	Men's event
Gold	Maksim Opalev	Canoeing	Men's C-1 500 m
Gold	Anastasia Davydova; Anastasiya Yermakova; Maria Gromova; Natalia Ishchenko; Elvira Khasyanova; Olga Kuzhela; Yelena Ovchinnikova; Anna Shorina; Svetlana Romashina	Synchronized swimming	Women's team
Gold	Evgeniya Kanaeva	Gymnastics	Women's rhythmic individual all-around
Gold	Rakhim Chakhkiev	Boxing	Heavyweight
Gold	Margarita Aliychuk; Anna Gavrilenko; Tatiana Gorbunova; Yelena Posevina; Daria Shkurikhina; Natalia Zuyeva	Gymnastics	Women's rhythmic team all-around
Gold	Aleksei Tishchenko	Boxing	Lightweight
Gold	Oxana Slivenko	Weightlifting	Women's 69 kg
Gold	Bakhtiyar Akhmedov	Wrestling	Men's freestyle 120 kg
Silver	Dmitri Sautin; Yuriy Kunakov	Diving	Men's 3 m synchronized springboard
Silver	Yuliya Pakhalina; Anastasia Pozdniakova	Diving	Women's 3 m synchronized springboard
Silver	Lioubov Galkina	Shooting	Women's 10 m air rifle
Silver	Natalia Paderina	Shooting	Women's 10 m air pistol
Silver	Danila Izotov; Yevgeny Lagunov; Nikita Lobintsev; Alexander Sukhorukov; Mikhail Polischuk*	Swimming	Men's 4 × 200 m freestyle relay
Silver	Dinara Safina	Tennis	Women's singles
Silver	Alena Kartashova	Wrestling	Women's freestyle 63 kg
Silver	Yuliya Pakhalina	Diving	Women's 3 m springboard
Silver	Dmitry Klokov	Weightlifting	Men's 105 kg
Silver	Evgeny Chigishev	Weightlifting	Men's +105 kg
Silver	Yevgeny Lukyanenko	Athletics	Men's pole vault
Silver	Aleksandr Kostoglod; Sergey Ulegin	Canoeing	Men's C-2 500 m
Silver	Russia women's national handball team: Inna Suslina; Mariya Sidorova; Yana Uskova; Yekaterina Marennikova; Emilia Turey; Yelena Dmitriyeva; Anna Kareeva; Liudmila Postnova; Irina Bliznova; Yelena Polenova; Oksana Romenskaya; Natalya Shipilova; Yekaterina Andryushina; Irina Poltoratskaya	Handball	Women's tournament
Bronze	Dmitry Dobroskok; Gleb Galperin	Diving	Men's 10 m synchronized platform
Bronze	Aleksey Alipov	Shooting	Men's trap
Bronze	Arkady Vyatchanin	Swimming	Men's 100 m backstroke
Bronze	Arkady Vyatchanin	Swimming	Men's 200 m backstroke
Bronze	Vladimir Isakov	Shooting	Men's 50 m pistol
Bronze	Mikhail Kuznetsov; Dmitry Larionov	Canoeing	Men's slalom C-2
Bronze	Bair Badënov	Archery	Men's individual
Bronze	Vera Zvonareva	Tennis	Women's singles
Bronze	Anton Golotsutskov	Gymnastics	Men's floor
Bronze	Anton Golotsutskov	Gymnastics	Men's vault
Bronze	Svetlana Feofanova	Athletics	Women's pole vault
Bronze	Besik Kudukhov	Wrestling	Men's freestyle 55 kg
Bronze	Mikhail Ignatiev; Alexei Markov	Cycling	Men's madison
Bronze	Yaroslav Rybakov	Athletics	Men's high jump
Bronze	Georgy Ketoev	Wrestling	Men's freestyle 84 kg
Bronze	Denis Nizhegorodov	Athletics	Men's 50 km walk
Bronze	Georgy Balakshin	Boxing	Flyweight
Bronze	Irina Kalentieva	Cycling	Women's cross-country
Bronze	Russia women's national basketball team: Svetlana Abrosimova; Becky Hammon; Marina Karpunina; Ilona Korstin; Marina Kuzina; Yekaterina Lisina; Irina Osipova; Oxana Rakhmatulina; Tatiana Shchegoleva; Irina Sokolovskaya; Maria Stepanova; Natalia Vodopyanova	Basketball	Women's tournament
Bronze	Gleb Galperin	Diving	Men's 10 m platform
Bronze	Russia men's national volleyball team: Aleksandr Korneev; Semyon Poltavskiy; Aleksandr Kosarev; Sergey Grankin; Sergey Tetyukhin; Vadim Khamuttskikh; Yury Berezhko; Aleksey Ostapenko; Aleksandr Volkov; Aleksey Verbov; Maxim Mikhaylov; Alexey Kuleshov	Volleyball	Men's tournament
Bronze	Alexandr Kolobnev	Cycling	Men's road race
Bronze	Tatyana Petrova	Athletics	3000 m steeplechase

Sport	1st place, gold medalist(s)	2nd place, silver medalist(s)	3rd place, bronze medalist(s)	Total
Archery	0	0	1	1
Athletics	5	1	4	10
Basketball	0	0	1	1
Boxing	2	0	1	3
Canoeing	1	1	1	3
Cycling	0	0	3	3
Diving	0	3	2	5
Fencing	1	0	0	1
Gymnastics	2	0	2	4
Handball	0	1	0	1
Modern pentathlon	1	0	0	1
Shooting	0	2	2	4
Swimming	1	1	2	4
Synchronized swimming	2	0	0	2
Tennis	1	1	1	3
Volleyball	0	0	1	1
Weightlifting	1	2	0	3
Wrestling	7	1	2	10
Total	24	13	23	60

== Competitors ==
The following is the list of number of competitors participating in the Games:

Sport	Men	Women	Total
Archery	3	2	5
Athletics	44	60	104
Badminton	1	1	2
Basketball	12	12	24
Boxing	11	0	11
Canoeing	12	2	14
Cycling	15	7	22
Diving	6	4	10
Equestrian	2	3	5
Fencing	4	10	14
Gymnastics	8	16	24
Handball	14	14	28
Judo	7	6	13
Modern pentathlon	2	2	4
Rowing	6	4	10
Sailing	5	5	10
Shooting	14	8	22
Swimming	21	14	35
Synchronised swimming	0	9	9
Table tennis	3	3	6
Tennis	4	5	9
Triathlon	3	2	5
Volleyball	14	14	28
Water polo	0	13	13
Weightlifting	6	4	10
Wrestling	14	4	18
Total	231	224	455

== Archery ==
Balzhinima Tsyrempilov and Bair Badënov earned men's qualifying places for Russia at the 2007 World Outdoor Target Championships, while Natalia Erdyniyeva and Miroslava Dagbaeva earned two spots for women. Andrey Abramov placed second at the European qualifying tournament, giving Russia a third spot in the men's individual competition and allowing the nation to field a men's team.

Men

Athlete	Event	Ranking round		Round of 64	Round of 32	Round of 16	Quarterfinals	Semifinals	Final / BM	
Athlete	Event	Score	Seed	Opposition Score	Opposition Score	Opposition Score	Opposition Score	Opposition Score	Opposition Score	Rank
Andrey Abramov	Individual	660	25	Johnson (USA) (40); L 109 (25)–109 (26)	Did not advance					
Bair Badënov	Individual	658	31	Godfrey (GBR) (34); W 114–109	Champia (IND) (2); W 109–108	Lyon (CAN) (47); W 115–110	Cheng C S (MAS) (26); W 109–104	Ruban (UKR) (3); L 112 (18)–112 (20)	Serrano (MEX) (1); W 115–110	3rd place, bronze medalist(s)
Balzhinima Tsyrempilov	Individual	671	6	Pavlov (BUL) (59); W 112–102	Chen S Y (TPE) (38); W 109–101	Moriya (JPN) (22); L 110–113	Did not advance			
Andrey Abramov; Bair Badënov; Balzhinima Tsyrempilov	Team	1989	4	—N/a		Bye	China (12); L 208–217	Did not advance		

Women

Athlete	Event	Ranking round		Round of 64	Round of 32	Round of 16	Quarterfinals	Semifinals	Final / BM	
Athlete	Event	Score	Seed	Opposition Score	Opposition Score	Opposition Score	Opposition Score	Opposition Score	Opposition Score	Rank
Miroslava Dagbaeva	Individual	637	23	Puspitasari (INA) (42); W 106 (10)–106 (9)	Rendón (COL) (10); L 106–110	Did not advance				
Natalia Erdyniyeva	Individual	647	11	Dielen (SUI) (54); W 107–102	Marcinkiewicz (POL) (43); W 104–103	Zhang Jj (CHN) (27); L 98–110	Did not advance			

== Athletics ==
Russia sent a team of 106 track and field athletes, 48 men and 58 women, to these games. On 31 July 2008, Yelena Soboleva, Tatyana Tomashova, Yuliya Fomenko, Darya Pishchalnikova, and Gulfiya Khanafeyeva were provisionally suspended by IAAF for doping offenses. Nine medals won by Russians in athletics at the 2008 Olympics were later stripped due to doping violations.

Key

- Note–Ranks given for track events are within the athlete's heat only
- Q = Qualified for the next round
- q = Qualified for the next round as a fastest loser or, in field events, by position without achieving the qualifying target
- NR = National record
- N/A = Round not applicable for the event
- Bye = Athlete not required to compete in round

Men
Track & road events

Athlete	Event	Heat		Quarterfinal		Semifinal		Final	
Athlete	Event	Result	Rank	Result	Rank	Result	Rank	Result	Rank
Denis Alekseyev	400 m	~~45.52~~	DSQ	—N/a		Did not advance			
Grigoriy Andreyev	Marathon	—N/a						2:13:33	14
Dmitry Bogdanov	800 m	1:47.49	3	—N/a		Did not advance			
Valeriy Borchin	20 km walk	—N/a						1:19:01	1st place, gold medalist(s)
Evgeniy Borisov	110 m hurdles	13.90	5	Did not advance					
Yuriy Borzakovskiy	800 m	1:45.15	2 Q	—N/a		1:46.53	3	Did not advance	
Aleksandr Derevyagin	400 m hurdles	49.19	5 q	—N/a		49.23	6	Did not advance	
Maksim Dyldin	400 m	46.03	5	—N/a		Did not advance			
Sergey Ivanov	10000 m	—N/a						28:34.72	30
Sergey Kirdyapkin	50 km walk	—N/a						DNF	
Oleg Kulkov	Marathon	—N/a						2:18:11	29
Ilya Markov	20 km walk	—N/a						1:22:02	17
Ildar Minshin	3000 m steeplechase	8:26.85	6	—N/a				Did not advance	
Denis Nizhegorodov	50 km walk	—N/a						3:40:14	3rd place, bronze medalist(s)
Igor Peremota	110 m hurdles	13.59	2 Q	13.70	7	Did not advance			
Pavel Potapovich	3000 m steeplechase	8:36.29	10	—N/a				Did not advance	
Vyacheslav Shabunin	1500 m	3:42.53	11	—N/a		Did not advance			
Roman Smirnov	200 m	20.76	1 Q	20.62	6	Did not advance			
Aleksey Sokolov	Marathon	—N/a						2:15:57	21
Andrey Yepishin	100 m	10.34	2 Q	10.25	6	Did not advance			
Denis Alekseyev; Maksim Dyldin; Vladislav Frolov; Anton Kokorin	4 × 400 m relay	~~3:00.14 NR~~	~~2 Q~~	—N/a				~~2:58.06 NR~~	DSQ

Field events

Athlete	Event	Qualification		Final	
Athlete	Event	Distance	Position	Distance	Position
Danil Burkenya	Triple jump	16.69	22	Did not advance	
Kirill Ikonnikov	Hammer throw	72.33	21	Did not advance	
Alexandr Ivanov	Javelin throw	79.27	14	Did not advance	
Ilya Korotkov	Javelin throw	83.33	2 Q	83.15	7
Anton Lyuboslavskiy	Shot put	19.87	18	Did not advance	
Yevgeny Lukyanenko	Pole vault	5.65	=1 q	5.85	2nd place, silver medalist(s)
Sergey Makarov	Javelin throw	72.47	26	Did not advance	
Vladimir Malyavin	Long jump	7.35	37	Did not advance	
Igor Pavlov	Pole vault	5.65	=1 q	5.60	9
Aleksandr Petrenko	Triple jump	16.97	17	Did not advance	
Bogdan Pishchalnikov	Discus throw	64.60	6 Q	65.88	6
Yaroslav Rybakov	High jump	2.25	9 q	2.33	3rd place, bronze medalist(s)
Andrey Silnov	High jump	2.29	6 q	2.36	1st place, gold medalist(s)
Pavel Sofin	Shot put	20.29	8 Q	20.42	7
Igor Spasovkhodskiy	Triple jump	17.23	6 Q	16.79	9
Dmitry Starodubtsev	Pole vault	5.65	11 q	5.70	5
Igor Vinichenko	Hammer throw	72.05	22	Did not advance	
Vyacheslav Voronin	High jump	2.25	14	Did not advance	
Ivan Yushkov	Shot put	20.02	12 Q	~~19.67~~	DSQ

Combined events – Decathlon

Athlete	Event	100 m	LJ	SP	HJ	400 m	110H	DT	PV	JT	1500 m	Final	Rank
Aleksey Drozdov	Result	11.02	7.23	16.26	2.02	51.56	15.51	47.43	5.10	62.57	4:41.34	8154	11
Aleksey Drozdov	Points	856	869	867	822	744	789	817	941	777	672	8154	11
Aleksandr Pogorelov	Result	11.07	7.37	16.53	2.08	50.91	14.47	50.04	5.00	64.01	5:01.56	DSQ	
Aleksandr Pogorelov	Points	845	903	884	878	773	915	871	910	798	551	DSQ	
Aleksey Sysoyev	Result	11.03	6.77	15.42	2.11	50.71	DNF	DNS	—	—	—	DNF	
Aleksey Sysoyev	Points	854	760	816	906	782	0	0	—	—	—	DNF	

Women
Track & road events

Athlete	Event	Heat		Quarterfinal		Semifinal		Final	
Athlete	Event	Result	Rank	Result	Rank	Result	Rank	Result	Rank
Inga Abitova	10000 m	—N/a						~~30:37.33~~	DSQ
Anna Alminova	1500 m	4:04.66	5 q	—N/a				4:06.99	11
Tatyana Andrianova	800 m	2:00.31	2 Q	—N/a		1:58.16	3 q	2:02.63	8
Aleksandra Antonova	100 m hurdles	13.18	5	—N/a		Did not advance			
Tatyana Aryasova	10000 m	—N/a						31:45.57	19
Yekaterina Bikert	400 m hurdles	55.15	1 Q	—N/a		54.38	4 Q	54.96	6
Galina Bogomolova	Marathon	—N/a						DNF	
Yuliya Chermoshanskaya	200 m	22.98	4 Q	22.63	1 Q	22.57	5	Did not advance	
Tatyana Dektyareva	100 m hurdles	13.05	5	—N/a		Did not advance			
Aleksandra Fedoriva	200 m	23.29	4 Q	23.04	5 q	23.22	8	Did not advance	
Tatyana Firova	400 m	50.59	2 Q	—N/a		50.31	3 q	50.11	6
Yuliya Gushchina	400 m	51.18	2 Q	—N/a		50.48	1 Q	50.01	4
Tatyana Kalmykova	20 km walk	—N/a						DSQ	
Olga Kaniskina	20 km walk	—N/a						1:26:31 OR	1st place, gold medalist(s)
Anastasiya Kapachinskaya	400 m	51.32	1 Q	—N/a		50.30	2 Q	~~50.03~~	DSQ
Svetlana Klyuka	800 m	2:01.67	1 Q	—N/a		1:58.31	1 Q	1:56.94	4
Yuliya Kondakova	100 m hurdles	13.07	4	—N/a		Did not advance			
Mariya Konovalova	10000 m	—N/a						30:35.84	5
Yekaterina Kostetskaya	800 m	2:00.54	3 Q	—N/a		1:58.33	3	Did not advance	
Natalya Murinovich	100 m	11.55	5 q	11.51	7	Did not advance			
Irina Obedina	400 m hurdles	55.71	2 Q	—N/a		55.69	6	Did not advance	
Anastasiya Ott	400 m hurdles	55.34	2 Q	—N/a		54.74	6	Did not advance	
Tatyana Petrova	3000 m steeplechase	9:28.85	1 Q	—N/a				9:12.33	3rd place, bronze medalist(s)
Yevgeniya Polyakova	100 m	11.24	1 Q	11.13	2 Q	11.38	7	Did not advance	
Natalya Rusakova	100 m	11.61	5 q	11.49	6	Did not advance			
Natalya Rusakova	200 m	23.21	3 Q	23.28	6	Did not advance			
Gulnara Samitova-Galkina	5000 m	15:11.46	5 Q	—N/a				15:56.97	12
Gulnara Samitova-Galkina	3000 m steeplechase	9:15.17	1 Q	—N/a				8:58.81 WR	1st place, gold medalist(s)
Liliya Shobukhova	5000 m	14:57.77	3 Q	—N/a				15:46.62	6
Tatyana Sibileva	20 km walk	—N/a						1:28:28	11
Irina Timofeyeva	Marathon	—N/a						2:27:31	7
Yekaterina Volkova	3000 m steeplechase	~~9:23.06~~	~~3 Q~~	—N/a				~~9:07.64~~	DSQ
Yelena Zadorozhnaya	5000 m	DNF		—N/a				Did not advance	
Svetlana Zakharova	Marathon	—N/a						2:32:16	22
Yuliya Chermoshanskaya; Aleksandra Fedoriva; Yuliya Gushchina; Yevgeniya Polyakova	4 × 100 m relay	42.87	2 Q	—N/a				42.31	DSQ
Tatyana Firova; Yuliya Gushchina; Anastasiya Kapachinskaya; Lyudmila Litvinova; Yelena Migunova; Tatyana Veshkurova	4 × 400 m relay	3:23.71	1 Q	—N/a				3:18.82	DSQ

Field events

Athlete	Event	Qualification		Final	
Athlete	Event	Distance	Position	Distance	Position
Mariya Abakumova	Javelin throw	63.48	4 Q	~~70.78 NR~~	DSQ
Anna Bulgakova	Hammer throw	68.04	20	Did not advance	
Anna Chicherova	High jump	1.93	12 q	2.03	DSQ
Svetlana Feofanova	Pole vault	4.50	6 q	4.75	3rd place, bronze medalist(s)
Yuliya Golubchikova	Pole vault	4.50	10 q	4.75	4
Viktoriya Gurova	Triple jump	14.78	3 Q	14.77	7
Yelena Isinbayeva	Pole vault	4.60	1 Q	5.05 WR	1st place, gold medalist(s)
Olga Ivanova	Shot put	18.46	15 Q	18.44	9
Irina Khudoroshkina	Shot put	16.84	25	Did not advance	
Yelena Konevtseva	Hammer throw	67.83	22	Did not advance	
Tatyana Kotova	Long jump	6.57	14	Did not advance	
Tatyana Lebedeva	Long jump	6.70	4 q	7.03	DSQ
Tatyana Lebedeva	Triple jump	14.55	5 Q	15.32	DSQ
Anna Omarova	Shot put	18.74	8 Q	19.08	6
Yelena Priyma	Hammer throw	70.69	9 q	69.72	10
Anna Pyatykh	Triple jump	14.45	8 Q	14.73	8
Natalya Sadova	Discus throw	58.11	25	Did not advance	
Svetlana Saykina	Discus throw	59.48	16	Did not advance	
Svetlana Shkolina	High jump	1.93	8 q	1.93	14
Yelena Slesarenko	High jump	1.93	14 q	2.01	4
Oksana Udmurtova	Long jump	6.63	7 q	6.70	6
Mariya Yakovenko	Javelin throw	51.67	47	Did not advance	
Oksana Esipchuk	Discus throw	55.07	32	Did not advance	

Combined events – Heptathlon

Athlete	Event	100H	HJ	SP	200 m	LJ	JT	800 m	Final	Rank
Anna Bogdanova	Result	13.09	1.86	14.08	24.24	6.45	35.41	2:09.45	6465 PB	6*
Anna Bogdanova	Points	1111	1054	799	958	991	579	973	6465 PB	6*
Tatyana Chernova	Result	13.65	1.83	12.88	23.95	6.47	48.37	2:06.50	6591	DSQ
Tatyana Chernova	Points	1028	1016	719	986	997	829	1016	6591	DSQ
Olga Kurban	Result	13.77	1.77	13.84	24.34	5.97	42.85	2:13.59	6192	13*
Olga Kurban	Points	1011	941	783	948	840	722	913	6192	13*

* On 16 August 2016, the Russian women's 4 × 100 metres relay team was disqualified for doping. The Russian team members were stripped of their gold Olympic medals, as Yuliya Chermoshanskaya had her samples reanalyzed and tested positive for two prohibited substances.
The IOC requested that the IAAF modify the results, and the medals were redistributed accordingly.

== Badminton ==
Athlete	Event	Round of 64	Round of 32	Round of 16	Quarterfinal	Semifinal	Final / BM	
Athlete	Event	Opposition Score	Opposition Score	Opposition Score	Opposition Score	Opposition Score	Opposition Score	Rank
Stanislav Pukhov	Men's singles	Bye	Navickas (LTU); L 12–21, 17–21	Did not advance				
Ella Diehl	Women's singles	Nehwal (IND); L 9–21, 8–21	Did not advance					

== Basketball ==
Russia qualified both its men's and women's basketball teams for the Olympic tournament when each took first place at their respective continental tournaments (EuroBasket 2007 and EuroBasket Women 2007). Of the four tournaments since Russia began competing separately, 2008 was the second appearance of the Russian men's team and the fourth of the women's team, which took bronze in 2004.

=== Men's tournament ===
Roster

The following is the Russia roster in the men's basketball tournament of the 2008 Summer Olympics.

Russia men's national basketball team – 2008 Summer Olympics roster
Players
Coaches

Pos.	No.	Name	Age – Date of birth	Height	Club	Ctr.
F	4	Andrey Vorontsevich	21 – July 17, 1987	6 ft 8 in (2.03 m)	CSKA Moscow	(Russia)
PG	5	Jon Robert Holden	31 – August 10, 1976	6 ft 1 in (1.85 m)	CSKA Moscow	(Russia)
G	6	Sergei Bykov	25 – February 26, 1983	6 ft 3 in (1.91 m)	Dynamo Moscow	(Russia)
F	7	Andrei Kirilenko (C)	27 – February 18, 1981	6 ft 10 in (2.08 m)	Utah Jazz	(United States)
C	8	Nikita Morgunov	33 – June 29, 1975	6 ft 11 in (2.11 m)	Lokomotiv Rostov	(Russia)
PG	9	Petr Samoylenko	31 – February 7, 1977	6 ft 2 in (1.88 m)	Dynamo Moscow	(Russia)
F	10	Victor Khryapa	26 – August 3, 1982	6 ft 9 in (2.06 m)	CSKA Moscow	(Russia)
SG	11	Zakhar Pashutin	34 – May 3, 1974	6 ft 5 in (1.96 m)	Spartak Saint Petersburg	(Russia)
SF	12	Sergei Monia	25 – April 15, 1983	6 ft 8 in (2.03 m)	Dynamo Moscow	(Russia)
SG	13	Vitaly Fridzon	22 – October 14, 1985	6 ft 5 in (1.96 m)	BC Khimki	(Russia)
C	14	Aleksey Savrasenko	29 – February 28, 1979	7 ft 1 in (2.16 m)	CSKA Moscow	(Russia)
SF	15	Viktor Keirou	24 – January 31, 1984	6 ft 7 in (2.01 m)	CSKA Moscow	(Russia)

Head coach

- (Israel) David Blatt

Legend

- (C) Team captain
- Club – describes last
  club before the tournament
- Age – describes age
  on August 9, 2008

Group play

Pos	Team	Pld	W	L	PF	PA	PD	Pts	Qualification
1	Lithuania	5	4	1	425	400	+25	9 (Note: Head-to-head record: Lithuania 1–0 Argentina)	Quarterfinals
2	Argentina	5	4	1	425	361	+64	9	Quarterfinals
3	Croatia	5	3	2	399	380	+19	8 (Note: Head-to-head record: Croatia 1–0 Australia)	Quarterfinals
4	Australia	5	3	2	457	405	+52	8	Quarterfinals
5	Russia	5	1	4	387	406	−19	6	
6	Iran	5	0	5	323	464	−141	5	

Source: FIBA archive
Rules for classification: 1) points; 2) head-to-head points; 3) head-to-head goal average; 4) head-to-head number of points scored.
Notes:

10 August 2008
09:00

Report

Russia	71–49	Iran
Scoring by quarter: 24–5, 14–17, 8–16, 25–11
Pts: Holden 19; Rebs: Monia 6 Asts: Savrasenko 4		Pts: Nikkhah 16; Rebs: Haddadi 8 Asts: Kamrani 3

Wukesong Indoor Stadium, Beijing
Attendance: 11,083
Referees: Nikolaos Pitsilkas (GRE)

12 August 2008
11:15

Report

Croatia	85–78	Russia
Scoring by quarter: 16–17, 26–19, 18–15, 25–27
Pts: Popović 22; Rebs: Barać 7 Asts: Popović, Lončar 3		Pts: Kirilenko 18; Rebs: Kirilenko 6 Asts: Kirilenko, Bikov 3

Wukesong Indoor Stadium, Beijing
Attendance: 11,083
Referees: Nikolaos Zavlanos (GRE)

14 August 2008
16:45

Report

Lithuania	86–79	Russia
Scoring by quarter: 23–24, 21–17, 25–21, 17–17
Pts: Kaukėnas 20; Rebs: Kleiza 11; Asts: Jasikevičius 5		Pts: Holden 25; Rebs: Khriapa 9 Asts: Kirilenko 6

Wukesong Indoor Stadium, Beijing
Attendance: 11,083
Referees: Nikolaos Pitsilkas (GRE)

16 August 2008
11:15

Report

Russia	80–95	Australia
Scoring by quarter: 16–27, 17–22, 22–20, 25–26
Pts: Khriapa 21; Rebs: Khriapa 9 Asts: Holden 6		Pts: Bogut, Bruton 22; Rebs: Bogut 8 Asts: Bruton 6

Wukesong Indoor Stadium, Beijing
Attendance: 11,083
Referees: Carl Jungebrand (FIN)

18 August 2008
22:15

Report

Argentina	91–79	Russia
Scoring by quarter: 27–16, 18–23, 27–25, 19–15
Pts: Scola 37; Rebs: Nocioni 9 Asts: Prigioni 10		Pts: Kirilenko 23; Rebs: Kirilenko 9 Asts: Holden 5

Wukesong Indoor Stadium, Beijing
Attendance: 11,083
Referees: Nikolaos Zavlanos (GRE)

=== Women's tournament ===
Roster

The following is the Russia roster in the women's basketball tournament of the 2008 Summer Olympics.

Russia women's national basketball team – 2008 Summer Olympics roster
Players
Coaches

Pos.	No.	Name	Age – Date of birth	Height	Club	Ctr.
F/C	4	Marina Kuzina	23 – July 19, 1985	6 ft 5 in (1.96 m)	UMMC Ekaterinburg	(Russia)
PG	5	Oxana Rakhmatulina	31 – December 7, 1976	5 ft 11 in (1.8 m)	UMMC Ekaterinburg	(Russia)
F	6	Natalia Vodopyanova	27 – June 4, 1981	6 ft 3 in (1.91 m)	UMMC Ekaterinburg	(Russia)
PG	7	Becky Hammon	31 – March 11, 1977	5 ft 6 in (1.68 m)	San Antonio Silver Stars	(United States)
SG	8	Marina Karpunina	24 – March 21, 1984	5 ft 9 in (1.75 m)	Spartak Moscow Region	(Russia)
PF	9	Tatiana Shchegoleva	26 – February 9, 1982	6 ft 4 in (1.93 m)	Spartak Moscow Region	(Russia)
SG	10	Ilona Korstin	28 – May 30, 1980	6 ft 0 in (1.83 m)	CSKA Moscow	(Russia)
C	11	Maria Stepanova	29 – February 23, 1979	6 ft 8 in (2.03 m)	CSKA Moscow	(Russia)
C	12	Ekaterina Lisina	20 – October 15, 1987	6 ft 6 in (1.98 m)	CSKA Moscow	(Russia)
F	13	Irina Sokolovskaya (C)	25 – January 3, 1983	6 ft 1 in (1.85 m)	CSKA Moscow	(Russia)
G/F	14	Svetlana Abrosimova	28 – July 9, 1980	6 ft 2 in (1.88 m)	UMMC Ekaterinburg	(Russia)
F/C	15	Irina Osipova	27 – June 25, 1981	6 ft 5 in (1.96 m)	Spartak Moscow Region	(Russia)

Head coach

- (Russia) Igor Grudin

Assistant coach(es)

- (Slovakia) Natália Hejková
- (Russia) Boris Sokolovsky

Legend

- (C) Team captain
- Club – describes last
  club before the tournament
- Age – describes age
  on August 9, 2008

Group play

Pos	Team	Pld	W	L	PF	PA	PD	Pts	Qualification
1	Australia	5	5	0	424	319	+105	10	Quarterfinals
2	Russia	5	4	1	339	333	+6	9	Quarterfinals
3	Belarus	5	2	3	324	332	−8	7 (Note: Head-to-head record: Belarus 1–0 South Korea)	Quarterfinals
4	South Korea	5	2	3	327	360	−33	7	Quarterfinals
5	Latvia	5	1	4	334	387	−53	6 (Note: Head-to-head record: Latvia 1–0 Brazil)	
6	Brazil	5	1	4	337	354	−17	6	

Source: FIBA archive
Rules for classification: 1) points; 2) head-to-head points; 3) head-to-head goal average; 4) head-to-head number of points scored.
Notes:

9 August 2008
22:15

Report

Latvia	57–62	Russia
Scoring by quarter: 7–14, 24–15, 17–12, 9–21
Pts: Jansone 24; Rebs: Tamane 6, Kubliņa 6 Asts: Jēkabsone-Žogota 6		Pts: Shchegoleva 12, Korstin 12; Rebs: Shchegoleva 12; Asts: Rakhmatulina 5

Wukesong Indoor Stadium, Beijing
Attendance: 11,083
Referees: Pablo Estevez (ARG)

11 August 2008
14:30

Report

South Korea	72–77	Russia
Scoring by quarter: 15–24, 20–13, 24–21, 13–19
Pts: Choi 13; Rebs: Sin 3 Asts: Jung 6		Pts: Korstin, Shchegoleva 13; Rebs: Osipova 9 Asts: Rakhmatulina 5

Wukesong Indoor Stadium, Beijing
Attendance: 11,083
Referees: Petr Sudek (SVK)

13 August 2008
09:00

Report

Belarus	65–71	Russia
Scoring by quarter: 19–20, 8–15, 13–17, 25–19
Pts: Marchanka 16; Rebs: Leuchanka 12; Asts: Leuchanka 4		Pts: Stepanova 13; Rebs: Abrosimova 10; Asts: Korstin 2

Wukesong Indoor Stadium, Beijing
Attendance: 11,083
Referees: Eddie Rush (USA)

15 August 2008
14:30

Report

Russia	74–64	Brazil
Scoring by quarter: 21–26, 14–15, 19–15, 20–8
Pts: Shchegoleva 14; Rebs: Korstin 10; Asts: Korstin 5		Pts: Pinto 21; Rebs: Zakrzeski 5 Asts: Pinto 6

Wukesong Indoor Stadium, Beijing
Attendance: 11,083
Referees: Luigi Lamonica (ITA)

17 August 2008
11:15

Report

Australia	75–55	Russia
Scoring by quarter: 15–19, 10–18, 30–10, 20–8
Pts: Snell, Jackson 16; Rebs: Jackson 14; Asts: Harrower 7		Pts: Hammon 20; Rebs: Abrosimova, Osipova 9 Asts: Karpunina 2

Wukesong Indoor Stadium, Beijing
Attendance: 11,083
Referees: Pablo Estevez (ARG)

Quarterfinals

19 August 2008
22:15

Report

Russia	84–65	Spain
Scoring by quarter: 10–21, 22–19, 24–15, 28–10
Pts: Shchegoleva 19; Rebs: Stepanova 10; Asts: Rakhmatulina 4		Pts: Valdemoro 16; Rebs: Pascua 6 Asts: Valdemoro, Palau, Torrens 1

Wukesong Indoor Stadium, Beijing
Attendance: 11,083
Referees: Ilija Belosevic (SRB)

Semifinals

21 August 2008
20:00

Report

Russia	52–67	United States
Scoring by quarter: 16–13, 16–20, 8–15, 12–19
Pts: Stepanova 14; Rebs: Korstin 8 Asts: Six-way tie 1		Pts: Taurasi 21; Rebs: Fowles 10; Asts: Smith 3

Wukesong Indoor Stadium, Beijing
Attendance: 11,083
Referees: Cristiano Maranho (BRA)

Bronze medal match

23 August 2008
19:30

Report

(bronze) Russia	94–81	China
Scoring by quarter: 24–23, 28–16, 20–18, 22–24
Pts: Hammon 22; Rebs: Stepanova 9 Asts: Karpunina 5		Pts: Chen 26; Rebs: Bian, Sui 6 Asts: Song 7

Wukesong Indoor Stadium, Beijing
Attendance: 11,083
Referees: Scott Butler (AUS)

== Boxing ==
Russia qualified eleven boxers for the Olympic boxing tournament, the maximum possible. Russia was the only nation to qualify a boxer in each weight class. Nine boxers qualified at the World Championships. Ayrapetyan qualified at the first European qualifying tournament. Balanov filled out the Russian team, earning a welterweight spot at the second European continental qualifying tournament.

Athlete	Event	Round of 32	Round of 16	Quarterfinals	Semifinals	Final	
Athlete	Event	Opposition Result	Opposition Result	Opposition Result	Opposition Result	Opposition Result	Rank
David Ayrapetyan	Light flyweight	Chygayev (UKR); L 11–13	Did not advance				
Georgy Balakshin	Flyweight	Bye	Sarsembayev (KAZ); W 12–4	Kumar (IND); W 15–11	Laffita (CUB); L 8–9	Did not advance	3rd place, bronze medalist(s)
Sergey Vodopyanov	Bantamweight	Arroyo (PUR); W 10–5	Kumar (IND); L 9–9^{+}	Did not advance			
Albert Selimov	Featherweight	Lomachenko (UKR); L 7–14	Did not advance				
Aleksei Tishchenko	Lightweight	Nejmaoui (TUN); W 10–2	Little (AUS); W 11–3	Pérez (COL); W 13–5	Javakhyan (ARM); W 10–5	Sow (FRA); W 11–9	1st place, gold medalist(s)
Gennady Kovalev	Light welterweight	Qiong (CHN); W 15–8	Colin (MRI); W 15–4	Iglesias (CUB); L 2–5	Did not advance		
Andrey Balanov	Welterweight	Kasuto (NAM); W 8–5	Andrade (USA); L 3–14	Did not advance			
Matvey Korobov	Middleweight	Terbunja (SWE); W 18–6	Artayev (KAZ); L 7–10	Did not advance			
Artur Beterbiev	Light heavyweight	Katende (SWE); W 15–3	Zhang Xp (CHN); L 2–8	Did not advance			
Rakhim Chakhkiev	Heavyweight	—N/a	Mazaheri (IRI); W 7–3	M'Bumba (FRA); W 18–9	Acosta (CUB); W 10–5	Russo (ITA); W 4–2	1st place, gold medalist(s)
Islam Timurziev	Super heavyweight	—N/a	Price (GBR); L RSC	Did not advance			

== Canoeing ==
=== Slalom ===
Athlete	Event	Preliminary						Semifinal		Final			
Athlete	Event	Run 1	Rank	Run 2	Rank	Total	Rank	Time	Rank	Time	Rank	Total	Rank
Alexander Lipatov	Men's C-1	87.65	5	90.51	11	178.16	9 Q	94.16	10	Did not advance			
Mikhail Kuznetsov; Dmitry Larionov	Men's C-2	98.43	7	97.65	6	196.08	6 Q	98.57	4 Q	98.80	4	197.37	3rd place, bronze medalist(s)
Aleksandra Perova	Women's K-1	93.41	2	166.04	21	259.45	18	Did not advance					

=== Sprint ===
Men

Athlete	Event	Heats		Semifinals		Final	
Athlete	Event	Time	Rank	Time	Rank	Time	Rank
Viktor Melantyev	C-1 1000 m	4:03.316	5 QS	4:02.854	4	Did not advance	
Maksim Opalev	C-1 500 m	1:47.849	1 QF	Bye		1:47.140	1st place, gold medalist(s)
Anton Ryakhov	K-1 500 m	1:37.666	2 QS	1:42.968	2 Q	1:38.187	5
Anton Ryakhov	K-1 1000 m	3:38.381	4 QS	3:37.017	5	Did not advance	
Aleksandr Kostoglod; Sergey Ulegin	C-2 500 m	1:41.241	2 QF	Bye		1:41.282	2nd place, silver medalist(s)
Aleksandr Kostoglod; Sergey Ulegin	C-2 1000 m	3:41.291	3 QF	Bye		3:44.669	8
Ilya Medvedev; Yevgeny Salakhov; Anton Vasilev; Konstantin Vishnyakov	K-4 1000 m	2:59.518	4 QS	3:00.459	1 Q	3:00.654	8

Women

Athlete	Event	Heats		Semifinals		Final	
Athlete	Event	Time	Rank	Time	Rank	Time	Rank
Yuliana Salakhova	K-1 500 m	1:51.628	5 QS	1:53.603	2 Q	1:53.973	9

Qualification Legend: QS = Qualify to semi-final; QF = Qualify directly to final

== Cycling ==
=== Road ===
Alexandr Kolobnev finished fourth in the men's road race, but as Italian Davide Rebellin, who won the silver medal, was stripped of that medal for testing positive for CERA after the event, the possibility exists for Kolobnev's placing to be upgraded.

Men

Athlete	Event	Time	Rank
Vladimir Efimkin	Road race	Did not finish	
Sergei Ivanov	Road race	6:39:42	77
Vladimir Karpets	Road race	6:24:59	18
Vladimir Karpets	Time trial	1:05:52	18
Alexandr Kolobnev	Road race	6:23:49	3rd place, bronze medalist(s)
Denis Menchov	Road race	6:34:26	59
Denis Menchov	Time trial	1:06:10	20

Women

Athlete	Event	Time	Rank
Natalia Boyarskaya	Road race	3:33:45	40
Natalia Boyarskaya	Time trial	37:14.65	16
Alexandra Burchenkova	Road race	3:36:32	43
Yuliya Martisova	Road race	3:32:45	12

=== Track ===
Sprint

Athlete	Event	Qualification		Round 1	Repechage 1	Round 2	Quarterfinals	Semifinals	Final	
Athlete	Event	Time Speed (km/h)	Rank	Opposition Time Speed (km/h)	Opposition Time Speed (km/h)	Opposition Time Speed (km/h)	Opposition Time Speed (km/h)	Opposition Time Speed (km/h)	Opposition Time Speed (km/h)	Rank
Denis Dmitriev	Men's sprint	10.565; 68.149	18 Q	Hoy (GBR); L	Mulder (NED); French (AUS); L	Did not advance				
Denis Dmitriev; Sergey Kucherov; Sergey Polynskiy	Men's team sprint	45.964; 58.741	12	Did not advance						
Svetlana Grankovskaya	Women's sprint	11.544; 62.370	11	Guo S (CHN); L	Krupeckaitė (LTU); Hijgenaar (NED); L	—N/a	Did not advance		9th place final Guerra (CUB); Hijgenaar (NED); Tsukuda (JPN); W 12.192	9

Pursuit

Athlete	Event	Qualification		Semifinals		Final	
Athlete	Event	Time	Rank	Opponent Results	Rank	Opponent Results	Rank
Alexei Markov	Men's individual pursuit	4:21.498	3 Q	Tauler (ESP); 4:22.308	4 Q	Burke (GBR); 4:24.149	4
Alexander Serov	Men's individual pursuit	4:23.732	8 Q	Wiggins (GBR); 4:25.391	7	Did not advance	
Alexei Markov; Alexander Petrovskiy; Alexander Serov; Nikolay Trusov; Evgeny Kovalev	Men's team pursuit	4:06.518	8 Q	Great Britain; LAP	–	Did not advance	

Keirin

Athlete	Event	1st round	Repechage	2nd round	Finals
Athlete	Event	Rank	Rank	Rank	Rank
Denis Dmitriev	Men's keirin	6 R	3	Did not advance	
Sergey Polynskiy	Men's keirin	5 R	4	Did not advance	

Omnium

Athlete	Event	Points	Laps	Rank
Mikhail Ignatiev	Men's points race	4	0	17
Olga Slyusareva	Women's points race	8	0	8
Mikhail Ignatiev; Alexei Markov	Men's madison	6	0	3rd place, bronze medalist(s)

=== Mountain biking ===
Athlete	Event	Time	Rank
Yuri Trofimov	Men's cross-country	LAP (2 laps)	41
Vera Andreeva	Women's cross-country	LAP (2 laps)	23
Irina Kalentieva	Women's cross-country	1:46:28	3rd place, bronze medalist(s)

== Diving ==
Men

Athlete	Events	Preliminaries		Semifinals		Final	
Athlete	Events	Points	Rank	Points	Rank	Points	Rank
Aleksandr Dobroskok	3 m springboard	431.15	17 Q	412.00	17	Did not advance	
Dmitri Sautin	3 m springboard	474.85	4 Q	476.35	8 Q	512.65	4
Gleb Galperin	10 m platform	499.95	3 Q	508.95	4 Q	525.80	3rd place, bronze medalist(s)
Oleg Vikulov	10 m platform	375.40	27	Did not advance			
Yuriy Kunakov; Dmitri Sautin	3 m synchronized springboard	—N/a				421.98	2nd place, silver medalist(s)
Dmitry Dobroskok; Gleb Galperin	10 m synchronized platform	—N/a				445.26	3rd place, bronze medalist(s)

Women

Athlete	Events	Preliminaries		Semifinals		Final	
Athlete	Events	Points	Rank	Points	Rank	Points	Rank
Svetlana Filippova	3 m springboard	274.20	19	Did not advance			
Yuliya Pakhalina	3 m springboard	358.15	2 Q	383.50	2 Q	398.60	2nd place, silver medalist(s)
Natalia Goncharova	10 m platform	240.45	28	Did not advance			
Yuliya Pakhalina; Anastasia Pozdniakova	3 m synchronized springboard	—N/a				323.61	2nd place, silver medalist(s)

== Equestrian ==
=== Dressage ===
Athlete	Horse	Event	Grand Prix		Grand Prix Special		Grand Prix Freestyle		Overall	
Athlete	Horse	Event	Score	Rank	Score	Rank	Score	Rank	Score	Rank
Alexandra Korelova	Balagur	Individual	68.500	15 Q	71.400	5 Q	73.850	8	72.625	6
Tatiana Miloserdova	Wat A Feeling	Individual	61.875	37	Did not advance					

=== Eventing ===
Athlete	Horse	Event	Dressage		Cross-country			Jumping						Total	
Athlete	Horse	Event	Dressage		Cross-country			Qualifier			Final			Total	
Athlete	Horse	Event	Penalties	Rank	Penalties	Total	Rank	Penalties	Total	Rank	Penalties	Total	Rank	Penalties	Rank
Igor Atrokhov	Elkasar	Individual	65.20	64	Eliminated			Did not advance							
Valery Martyshev	Kinzhal	Individual	64.40	62	60.40	124.80	52	12.00	136.80	48	Did not advance			136.80	48

=== Show jumping ===
Athlete	Horse	Event	Qualification								Final					Total	
Athlete	Horse	Event	Round 1		Round 2			Round 3			Round A		Round B			Total	
Athlete	Horse	Event	Penalties	Rank	Penalties	Total	Rank	Penalties	Total	Rank	Penalties	Rank	Penalties	Total	Rank	Penalties	Rank
Lyubov Kochetova	Ilion Kilen	Individual	8	49	33	41	61	Did not advance								41	61

== Fencing ==
In men's team sabre, Russia lost in the semi-finals to the USA 45–44 as Stanislav Pozdnyakov failed to win a bout against the Americans; the United States had been losing to Russia 40-35, before Keeth Smart outscored Pozdnyakov 10-4 for the win. Then Russia also lost its bronze medal match. Pozdnyakov subsequently retired.

Men

Athlete	Event	Round of 64	Round of 32	Round of 16	Quarterfinal	Semifinal	Final / BM	
Athlete	Event	Opposition Score	Opposition Score	Opposition Score	Opposition Score	Opposition Score	Opposition Score	Rank
Anton Avdeev	Individual épée	Bye	Robeiri (FRA); L 11–15	Did not advance				
Nikolay Kovalev	Individual sabre	O'Connell (GBR); W 15–14	Martí (ESP); L 12–15	Did not advance				
Stanislav Pozdnyakov	Individual sabre	Bye	Lopez (FRA); L 8–15	Did not advance				
Aleksey Yakimenko	Individual sabre	Bye	Buikevich (BLR); L 9–15	Did not advance				
Nikolay Kovalev; Stanislav Pozdnyakov; Aleksey Yakimenko	Team sabre	—N/a			China; W 45–36	United States; L 44–45	Italy; L 44–45	4

Women

Athlete	Event	Round of 64	Round of 32	Round of 16	Quarterfinal	Semifinal	Final / BM	
Athlete	Event	Opposition Score	Opposition Score	Opposition Score	Opposition Score	Opposition Score	Opposition Score	Rank
Tatiana Logunova	Individual épée	—N/a	Samuelsson (SWE); L 6–15	Did not advance				
Lyubov Shutova	Individual épée	—N/a	Bye	Szász (HUN); W 15–12	Brânză (ROU); L 13–15	Did not advance		
Aida Shanayeva	Individual foil	Bye	Gruchała (POL); W 12–11	Trillini (ITA); L 3–15	Did not advance			
Yevgeniya Lamonova	Individual foil	Bye	Schache (GER); W 15–2	Mohamed (HUN); W 15–5	Granbassi (ITA); L 7–12	Did not advance		
Viktoria Nikishina	Individual foil	Bye	Hatuel (ISR); W 10–9	Granbassi (ITA); L 4–11	Did not advance			
Svetlana Boyko; Aida Shanayeva; Yevgeniya Lamonova; Viktoria Nikishina	Team foil	—N/a			Egypt; W 45–23	Italy; W 22–21	United States; W 28–21	1st place, gold medalist(s)
Yekaterina Dyachenko	Individual sabre	Bye	Hisagae (JPN); W 15–10	Khomrova (UKR); L 14–15	Did not advance			
Yelena Nechayeva	Individual sabre	Bye	Wieckowska (POL); L 12–15	Did not advance				
Sofiya Velikaya	Individual sabre	Bye	Pundyk (UKR); W 15–7	Bianco (ITA); W 15–6	Xue T (CHN); W 15–9	Jacobson (USA); L 11–15	Ward (USA); L 14–15	4
Yekaterina Dyachenko; Yekaterina Fedorkina; Yelena Nechayeva; Sofiya Velikaya	Team sabre	—N/a			Ukraine; L 34–45	Classification semi-final South Africa; W 45–13	5th place final Poland; W 45–36	5

== Gymnastics ==
=== Artistic ===
Men
Team

Athlete	Event	Qualification								Final							
Athlete	Event	Apparatus						Total	Rank	Apparatus						Total	Rank
Athlete	Event	F	PH	R	V	PB	HB	Total	Rank	F	PH	R	V	PB	HB	Total	Rank
Maksim Devyatovskiy	Team	15.300	13.300	15.375	15.825	15.425	15.125	90.350	14 Q	15.175	13.575	15.450	15.525	—N/a	14.325	—N/a	
Anton Golotsutskov	Team	15.300 Q	12.325	15.075	16.550 Q	—N/a	14.300	—N/a		15.650	—N/a		16.575	—N/a			
Sergey Khorokhordin	Team	14.975	14.800	15.075	15.725	15.875	15.350	91.800	7 Q	15.225	13.825	—N/a		15.675	14.575	—N/a	
Nikolai Kryukov	Team	—N/a	14.850	—N/a	16.200	16.175 Q	15.050	—N/a		—N/a	15.475	—N/a	16.050	16.150	—N/a		
Konstantin Pluzhnikov	Team	14.450	—N/a	14.275	—N/a	14.950	—N/a			—N/a		15.250	—N/a				
Yuri Ryazanov	Team	14.600	14.450	15.100	15.550	15.625	14.800	90.125	17*	—N/a		15.250	—N/a	15.475	15.075	—N/a	
Total	Team	60.475	57.400	60.625	64.300	63.100	60.325	366.225	3 Q	46.050	42.875	45.950	48.150	47.300	43.975	274.300	6

* Only two gymnasts per country may advance to a final.

Individual finals

Athlete	Event	Apparatus						Total	Rank
Athlete	Event	F	PH	R	V	PB	HB	Total	Rank
Maksim Devyatovskiy	All-around	15.225	15.200	15.625	15.225	15.325	15.100	91.700	6
Anton Golotsutskov	Floor	15.725	—N/a					15.725	3rd place, bronze medalist(s)
Anton Golotsutskov	Vault	—N/a			16.475	—N/a		16.475	3rd place, bronze medalist(s)
Sergey Khorokhordin	All-around	15.150	15.100	15.400	15.300	15.700	15.050	91.700	5
Nikolai Kryukov	Parallel bars	—N/a				15.150	—N/a	15.150	8

Women
Team

Athlete	Event	Qualification						Final					
Athlete	Event	Apparatus				Total	Rank	Apparatus				Total	Rank
Athlete	Event	F	V	UB	BB	Total	Rank	F	V	UB	BB	Total	Rank
Ksenia Afanasyeva	Team	15.025	15.175	14.825	15.775 Q	60.800	6*	15.075	14.925	14.375	—N/a		
Lyudmila Grebenkova	Team	—N/a			14.600	—N/a		—N/a			14.575	—N/a	
Svetlana Klyukina	Team	13.950	15.175	14.975	—N/a			—N/a	15.150	—N/a			
Ekaterina Kramarenko	Team	15.150 Q	15.150	15.500	14.625	60.425	10*	15.125	—N/a	15.575	—N/a		
Anna Pavlova	Team	15.125	15.350 Q	14.600 Q	15.825 Q	60.900	5 Q	13.850	15.200	—N/a	15.100	—N/a	
Ksenia Semyonova	Team	14.472	14.750	16.425	15.775	61.475	4 Q	—N/a		16.450	15.225	—N/a	
Total	Team	59.775	60.850	61.775	62.000	244.400	3 Q	43.350	45.425	46.950	44.900	180.625	4

* Only two gymnasts per country may advance to a final.

Individual finals

Athlete	Event	Apparatus				Total	Rank
Athlete	Event	F	V	UB	BB	Total	Rank
Ksenia Afanasyeva	Balance beam	—N/a			14.825	14.825	7
Ekaterina Kramarenko	Floor	15.025	—N/a			15.025	5
Anna Pavlova	All-around	15.050	15.275	14.525	15.975	60.825	7
Anna Pavlova	Floor	14.125	—N/a			14.125	8
Anna Pavlova	Vault	—N/a	7.812	—N/a		7.812	8
Anna Pavlova	Balance beam	—N/a			15.900	15.900	4
Ksenia Semyonova	All-around	14.775	14.850	16.475	15.925	61.925	4
Ksenia Semyonova	Uneven bars	—N/a		16.325	—N/a	16.325	6

=== Rhythmic ===
Athlete	Event	Qualification						Final					
Athlete	Event	Rope	Hoop	Clubs	Ribbon	Total	Rank	Rope	Hoop	Clubs	Ribbon	Total	Rank
Evgeniya Kanaeva	Individual	17.850	18.700	18.700	18.825	74.075	1 Q	18.850	18.850	18.950	18.850	75.500	1st place, gold medalist(s)
Olga Kapranova	Individual	18.350	18.475	18.200	17.875	72.900	2 Q	18.200	18.500	16.950	18.050	71.700	4

Athlete	Event	Qualification				Final			
Athlete	Event	5 ropes	3 hoops 2 clubs	Total	Rank	5 ropes	3 hoops 2 clubs	Total	Rank
Margarita Aliychuk; Anna Gavrilenko; Tatiana Gorbunova; Yelena Posevina; Daria Shkurikhina; Natalia Zuyeva	Team	17.000	17.700	34.700	2 Q	17.750	17.800	35.550	1st place, gold medalist(s)

=== Trampoline ===
Athlete	Event	Qualification		Final	
Athlete	Event	Score	Rank	Score	Rank
Alexander Rusakov	Men's	69.90	6 Q	38.50	7
Dmitry Ushakov	Men's	71.50	3 Q	38.80	6
Natalia Chernova	Women's	63.00	11	Did not advance	
Irina Karavayeva	Women's	66.40	2 Q	36.20	5

== Handball ==
=== Men's tournament ===
Roster

The following is the Russia roster in the men's handball tournament of the 2008 Summer Olympics.

Head coach: Vladimir Maksimov

No.	Pos.	Name	Date of birth (age)	Height	App.	Goals	Club
1	GK	Oleg Grams	20 February 1984 (aged 24)	2.01 m	33	0	(Russia) Chekhovskiye Medvedi
2	CB	Vasily Filippov	18 January 1981 (aged 27)	1.83 m	69	152	(Russia) Chekhovskiye Medvedi
6	RB	Denis Krivoshlykov	10 May 1971 (aged 37)	1.80 m	170	468	(Spain) CB Ademar León
8	P	Egor Evdokimov	9 March 1982 (aged 26)	2.03 m	69	103	(Russia) Chekhovskiye Medvedi
10	P	Alexander Chernoivanov	13 February 1979 (aged 29)	2.01 m	48	80	(Russia) Chekhovskiye Medvedi
15	LB	Alexey Rastvortsev	12 August 1978 (aged 29)	2.01 m	181	703	(Russia) Chekhovskiye Medvedi
16	GK	Alexey Kostygov	5 July 1973 (aged 35)	1.91 m	103	0	(Russia) Chekhovskiye Medvedi
17	RB	Alexey Kamanin	6 June 1978 (aged 30)	1.98 m	148	319	(Russia) Chekhovskiye Medvedi
19	LB	Samvel Aslanyan	23 February 1986 (aged 22)	1.88 m	14	15	(Russia) Chekhovskiye Medvedi
23	LW	Eduard Kokcharov	4 December 1975 (aged 32)	1.85 m	199	1023	(Slovenia) Celje Pivovarna Laško
25	RW	Dmitry Kovalev	15 May 1982 (aged 26)	1.80 m	64	131	(Russia) Chekhovskiye Medvedi
31	LW	Timur Dibirov	30 July 1983 (aged 25)	1.80 m	51	133	(Russia) Chekhovskiye Medvedi
35	RB	Konstantin Igropulo	14 April 1985 (aged 23)	1.91 m	45	182	(Russia) Chekhovskiye Medvedi
77	CB	Vitali Ivanov	3 February 1976 (aged 32)	1.93 m	180	443	(Russia) Chekhovskiye Medvedi

Group play

Team	Pld	W	D	L	GF	GA	GD	Pts	Qualification
South Korea	5	3	0	2	122	129	−7	6	Qualified for the quarterfinals
Denmark	5	2	2	1	137	131	+6	6	Qualified for the quarterfinals
Iceland	5	2	2	1	151	146	+5	6	Qualified for the quarterfinals
Russia	5	2	1	2	136	131	+5	5	Qualified for the quarterfinals
Germany	5	2	1	2	126	130	−4	5	
Egypt	5	0	2	3	127	132	−5	2	

10 August 2008; 10:45	Russia	31 – 33	Iceland	Olympic Sports Centre Gymnasium; Referees: Krstic, Ljubic (SLO)
10 August 2008; 10:45	Igropulo 9	(16–19)	Guðjónsson 12	Olympic Sports Centre Gymnasium; Referees: Krstic, Ljubic (SLO)
10 August 2008; 10:45	3× (yellow card) 6× (suspension)	Report	3× (yellow card) 3× (suspension)	Olympic Sports Centre Gymnasium; Referees: Krstic, Ljubic (SLO)

12 August 2008; 10:45	Egypt	27 – 28	Russia	Olympic Sports Centre Gymnasium; Referees: Liudowyk, Vakula (UKR)
12 August 2008; 10:45	El Ahmar 10	(14–14)	Rastvortsev 8	Olympic Sports Centre Gymnasium; Referees: Liudowyk, Vakula (UKR)
12 August 2008; 10:45	3× (yellow card) 4× (suspension)	Report	3× (yellow card) 4× (suspension)	Olympic Sports Centre Gymnasium; Referees: Liudowyk, Vakula (UKR)

14 August 2008; 19:00	Denmark	25 – 24	Russia	Olympic Sports Centre Gymnasium; Referees: Breto, Huelin (ESP)
14 August 2008; 19:00	Christiansen 6	(10–10)	Chernoivanov, Igropulo 6	Olympic Sports Centre Gymnasium; Referees: Breto, Huelin (ESP)
14 August 2008; 19:00	2× (yellow card) 3× (suspension)	Report	3× (yellow card) 4× (suspension)	Olympic Sports Centre Gymnasium; Referees: Breto, Huelin (ESP)

16 August 2008; 15:45	Russia	24 – 24	Germany	Olympic Sports Centre Gymnasium; Referees: Gjeding, Hansen (DEN)
16 August 2008; 15:45	Filippov 6	(11–10)	Kraus 6	Olympic Sports Centre Gymnasium; Referees: Gjeding, Hansen (DEN)
16 August 2008; 15:45	1× (yellow card) 6× (suspension) 1× (red card)	Report	4× (yellow card) 3× (suspension)	Olympic Sports Centre Gymnasium; Referees: Gjeding, Hansen (DEN)

18 August 2008; 14:00	Russia	29 – 22	South Korea	Olympic Sports Centre Gymnasium; Referees: Bord, Buy (FRA)
18 August 2008; 14:00	Rastvortsev 6	(17–12)	Yoon Kyung-shin 7	Olympic Sports Centre Gymnasium; Referees: Bord, Buy (FRA)
18 August 2008; 14:00	3× (yellow card) 4× (suspension)	Report	1× (yellow card) 1× (suspension)	Olympic Sports Centre Gymnasium; Referees: Bord, Buy (FRA)

Quarterfinal

20 August 2008; 12:00	France	27 – 24	Russia	Olympic Sports Centre Gymnasium; Referees: Lemme, Ullrich (GER)
20 August 2008; 12:00	Narcisse 9	(13–10)	Kokcharov 5	Olympic Sports Centre Gymnasium; Referees: Lemme, Ullrich (GER)
20 August 2008; 12:00	4× (yellow card) 2× (suspension)	Report	3× (yellow card) 2× (suspension)	Olympic Sports Centre Gymnasium; Referees: Lemme, Ullrich (GER)

Classification semifinal

22 August 2008; 12:00	Russia	28 – 27	Denmark	Beijing National Indoor Stadium; Referees: Elmoamli, Shaban Ali (EGY)
22 August 2008; 12:00	Dibirov 8	(17–14)	Christiansen 8	Beijing National Indoor Stadium; Referees: Elmoamli, Shaban Ali (EGY)
22 August 2008; 12:00	4× (yellow card) 2× (suspension)	Report	4× (yellow card) 5× (suspension) 1× (red card)	Beijing National Indoor Stadium; Referees: Elmoamli, Shaban Ali (EGY)

5th–6th place

24 August 2008; 10:15	Russia	28 – 29	Poland	Beijing National Indoor Stadium; Referees: Karbaschi, Kolahdouzan (IRI)
24 August 2008; 10:15	Kokcharov 10	(15–14)	Jurasik 6	Beijing National Indoor Stadium; Referees: Karbaschi, Kolahdouzan (IRI)
24 August 2008; 10:15	4× (yellow card) 5× (suspension)	Report	4× (yellow card) 4× (suspension)	Beijing National Indoor Stadium; Referees: Karbaschi, Kolahdouzan (IRI)

=== Women's tournament ===
Roster

The following is the Russia roster in the women's handball tournament of the 2008 Summer Olympics.

Head coach: Yevgeni Trefilov

No.	Pos.	Name	Date of birth (age)	Height	App.	Goals	Club
1	GK	Inna Suslina	5 January 1979 (aged 29)	1.83 m			(Russia) Zvezda Zvenigorod
3	CB	Irina Poltoratskaya	2 March 1979 (aged 29)	1.78 m			(Russia) Zvezda Zvenigorod
4	P	Oxana Romenskaya	6 June 1976 (aged 32)	1.91 m			(Russia) Zvezda Zvenigorod
5	LB	Lyudmila Postnova	11 August 1984 (aged 23)	1.80 m			(Russia) Lada Togliatti
6	LB	Anna Kareyeva	10 May 1977 (aged 31)	1.85 m			(Russia) Zvezda Zvenigorod
8	CB	Yekaterina Andryushina	17 August 1985 (aged 22)	1.85 m			(Russia) Zvezda Zvenigorod
9	RW	Yana Uskova	28 September 1985 (aged 22)	1.68 m			(Slovenia) Krim Ljubljana
10	LB	Yelena Polenova	20 August 1983 (aged 24)	1.98 m			(Russia) Zvezda Zvenigorod
11	LW	Emiliia Turei	6 October 1984 (aged 23)	1.74 m			(Denmark) Slagelse Dream Team
12	P	Natalia Shipilova	31 December 1979 (aged 28)	1.81 m			(Russia) Zvezda Zvenigorod
16	GK	Maria Sidorova	21 November 1979 (aged 28)	1.78 m			(Russia) Lada Togliatti
17	LW	Yekaterina Marennikova	29 April 1982 (aged 26)	1.73 m			(Russia) Lada Togliatti
19	LW	Yelena Dmitriyeva	1 July 1983 (aged 25)	1.75 m			(Russia) Zvezda Zvenigorod
24	RB	Irina Bliznova	6 October 1986 (aged 21)	1.80 m			(Russia) Lada Togliatti

Group play

Team	Pld	W	D	L	GF	GA	GD	Pts	Qualification
Russia	5	4	1	0	148	125	+23	9	Qualified for the quarterfinals
South Korea	5	3	1	1	155	127	+28	7	Qualified for the quarterfinals
Hungary	5	2	1	2	129	142	−13	5	Qualified for the quarterfinals
Sweden	5	2	0	3	123	137	−14	4	Qualified for the quarterfinals
Brazil	5	1	1	3	124	137	−13	3	
Germany	5	1	0	4	123	134	−11	2	

9 August 2008; 15:45	Russia	29 – 29	South Korea	Olympic Sports Centre Gymnasium; Referees: Gjeding, Hansen (DEN)
9 August 2008; 15:45	Marennikova 6	(16–13)	Kim On-a 7	Olympic Sports Centre Gymnasium; Referees: Gjeding, Hansen (DEN)
9 August 2008; 15:45	3× (yellow card) 5× (suspension)	Report	2× (yellow card) 2× (suspension)	Olympic Sports Centre Gymnasium; Referees: Gjeding, Hansen (DEN)

11 August 2008; 20:45	Sweden	24 – 28	Russia	Olympic Sports Centre Gymnasium; Referees: Din, Dinu (ROU)
11 August 2008; 20:45	Wiel Fredén 6	(12–14)	Turei 6	Olympic Sports Centre Gymnasium; Referees: Din, Dinu (ROU)
11 August 2008; 20:45	4× (yellow card) 4× (suspension)	Report	3× (yellow card) 4× (suspension)	Olympic Sports Centre Gymnasium; Referees: Din, Dinu (ROU)

13 August 2008; 09:00	Russia	28 – 19	Brazil	Olympic Sports Centre Gymnasium; Referees: Licis, Stolarovs (LAT)
13 August 2008; 09:00	Poltoratskaya 6	(12–10)	Nascimento 5	Olympic Sports Centre Gymnasium; Referees: Licis, Stolarovs (LAT)
13 August 2008; 09:00	2× (yellow card) 4× (suspension)	Report	3× (yellow card) 2× (suspension)	Olympic Sports Centre Gymnasium; Referees: Licis, Stolarovs (LAT)

15 August 2008; 20:45	Hungary	24 – 33	Russia	Olympic Sports Centre Gymnasium; Referees: Din, Dinu (ROU)
15 August 2008; 20:45	Görbicz 6	(15–16)	Postnova 8	Olympic Sports Centre Gymnasium; Referees: Din, Dinu (ROU)
15 August 2008; 20:45	3× (yellow card) 3× (suspension)	Report	3× (yellow card) 2× (suspension)	Olympic Sports Centre Gymnasium; Referees: Din, Dinu (ROU)

17 August 2008; 19:00	Russia	30 – 29	Germany	Olympic Sports Centre Gymnasium; Referees: Gjeding, Hansen (DEN)
17 August 2008; 19:00	Postnova 8	(16–14)	Wörz 8	Olympic Sports Centre Gymnasium; Referees: Gjeding, Hansen (DEN)
17 August 2008; 19:00	2× (yellow card) 4× (suspension)	Report	3× (yellow card) 3× (suspension)	Olympic Sports Centre Gymnasium; Referees: Gjeding, Hansen (DEN)

Quarterfinal

19 August 2008
20:15
Russia
32 – 31 (ET)
France
Olympic Sports Centre Gymnasium
Referees: Liu S, Liu F (CHN)
Bliznova 6
(12–16)
Signaté 7
4× (yellow card) 2× (suspension)
Report
4× (yellow card) 4× (suspension)

FT: 24–24 ET: 4–4, 4–3

Semifinal

21 August 2008; 20:15	Hungary	20 – 22	Russia	Beijing National Indoor Stadium; Referees: Baum, Goralczyk (POL)
21 August 2008; 20:15	Tóth 5	(9–14)	Bliznova 7	Beijing National Indoor Stadium; Referees: Baum, Goralczyk (POL)
21 August 2008; 20:15	4× (yellow card) 6× (suspension)	Report	3× (yellow card) 7× (suspension) 1× (red card)	Beijing National Indoor Stadium; Referees: Baum, Goralczyk (POL)

Gold medal game

23 August 2008; 15:45	Norway	34 – 27	Russia	Beijing National Indoor Stadium; Referees: Bord, Buy (FRA)
23 August 2008; 15:45	Riegelhuth 9	(18–13)	Bliznova 6	Beijing National Indoor Stadium; Referees: Bord, Buy (FRA)
23 August 2008; 15:45	3× (yellow card) 3× (suspension)	Report	2× (yellow card) 2× (suspension)	Beijing National Indoor Stadium; Referees: Bord, Buy (FRA)

Final rank

Silver

== Judo ==
Men

Athlete	Event	Preliminary	Round of 32	Round of 16	Quarterfinals	Semifinals	Repechage 1	Repechage 2	Repechage 3	Final / BM	
Athlete	Event	Opposition Result	Opposition Result	Opposition Result	Opposition Result	Opposition Result	Opposition Result	Opposition Result	Opposition Result	Opposition Result	Rank
Ruslan Kishmakov	−60 kg	Bye	Khousrof (YEM); W 0200–0000	Liu (CHN); W 0100–0000	Dragin (FRA); L 0000–0002	Did not advance	Bye	Yekutiel (ISR); L 0000–0001	Did not advance		
Alim Gadanov	−66 kg	Bye	Gasimov (AZE); W 0120–0101	Ungvári (HUN); W 0011–0002	Darbelet (FRA); L 0010–1010	Did not advance	Bye	Mehmedovic (CAN); W 1000–0000	Casale (ITA); W 1002–0010	Arencibia (CUB); L 0001–0010	5
Salamu Mezhidov	−73 kg	—N/a	Bilodid (UKR); L 0000–1000	Did not advance							
Alibek Bashkaev	−81 kg	Bye	Attaf (MAR); L 0001–1000	Did not advance							
Ivan Pershin	−90 kg	—N/a	Trezise (RSA); W 1000–0000	Rosati (ARG); W 1000–0000	Kazusionak (BLR); W 1010–0000	Tsirekidze (GEO); L 0000–1002	Bye			Aschwanden (SUI); L 0020–1000	5
Ruslan Gasymov	−100 kg	—N/a	Behrla (GER); L 0001–1100	Did not advance							
Tamerlan Tmenov	+100 kg	Bye	van der Geest (NED); W 0101–0000	Pan S (CHN); W 0200–0000	Ishii (JPN); L 0000–1100	Did not advance	Bye	Bianchessi (ITA); W 0010–0000	Roudaki (IRI); L 0001–1010	Did not advance	

Women

Athlete	Event	Round of 32	Round of 16	Quarterfinals	Semifinals	Repechage 1	Repechage 2	Repechage 3	Final / BM	
Athlete	Event	Opposition Result	Opposition Result	Opposition Result	Opposition Result	Opposition Result	Opposition Result	Opposition Result	Opposition Result	Rank
Lyudmila Bogdanova	−48 kg	Bye	Bermoy (CUB); L 0001–0010	Did not advance		Miranda (ECU); W 1000–0010	Baschin (GER); W 0001–0000	Hormigo (POR); W 0100–0001	Tani (JPN); L 0000–0001	5
Anna Kharitonova	−52 kg	Bye	Monteiro (POR); L 0000–0211	Did not advance						
Vera Koval	−63 kg	Willeboordse (NED); L 0010–0012	Did not advance							
Yulia Kuzina	−70 kg	Bye	Mészáros (HUN); L 0002–0010	Did not advance						
Vera Moskalyuk	−78 kg	San Miguel (ESP); L 0000–0002	Did not advance			Silva (BRA); L 0000–0021	Did not advance			
Tea Donguzashvili	+78 kg	Tong W (CHN); L 0000–1000	Did not advance			Prokof'yeva (UKR); W 0100–0000	Kim N-Y (KOR); L 0000–1000	Did not advance		

== Modern pentathlon ==
Athlete	Event	Shooting (10 m air pistol)			Fencing (épée one touch)			Swimming (200 m freestyle)			Riding (show jumping)			Running (3000 m)			Total points	Final rank
Athlete	Event	Points	Rank	MP Points	Results	Rank	MP points	Time	Rank	MP points	Penalties	Rank	MP points	Time	Rank	MP Points	Total points	Final rank
Ilia Frolov	Men's	178	22	1072	18–17	13	832	2:04.01	11	1312	372	28	828	9:04.95	2	1224	5268	20
Andrey Moiseev	Men's	186	5	1168	26–9	1	1024	2:02.55	6	1332	140	15	1060	9:48.75	27	1048	5632	1st place, gold medalist(s)
Evdokia Gretchichnikova	Women's	178	15	1072	20–15	=11	880	2:26.37	29	1164	224	32	976	10:43.65	15	1148	5240	25
Tatiana Mouratova	Women's	179	14	1084	22–13	=5	928	2:22.98	26	1208	92	19	1108	10:49.35	=18	1124	5452	12

== Rowing ==
Men

Athlete	Event	Heats		Repechage		Semifinals		Final	
Athlete	Event	Time	Rank	Time	Rank	Time	Rank	Time	Rank
Aleksandr Kornilov; Aleksey Svirin	Double sculls	6:44.46	4 R	6:23.52	1 SA/B	6:27.75	5 FB	6:49.84	11
Sergey Fedorovtsev; Nikita Morgachyov; Igor Salov; Nikolay Spinyov	Quadruple sculls	5:39.18	3 SA/B	Bye		5:59.56	5 FB	5:46.17	7

Women

Athlete	Event	Heats		Repechage		Final	
Athlete	Event	Time	Rank	Time	Rank	Time	Rank
Oksana Dorodnova; Yuliya Kalinovskaya; Yuliya Levina; Larisa Merk	Quadruple sculls	6:26.21	4 R	6:51.14	5 FB	6:28.10	7

Qualification Legend: FA=Final A (medal); FB=Final B (non-medal); FC=Final C (non-medal); FD=Final D (non-medal); FE=Final E (non-medal); FF=Final F (non-medal); SA/B=Semifinals A/B; SC/D=Semifinals C/D; SE/F=Semifinals E/F; QF=Quarterfinals; R=Repechage

== Sailing ==
Men

Athlete	Event	Race											Net points	Final rank
Athlete	Event	1	2	3	4	5	6	7	8	9	10	M*	Net points	Final rank
Alexey Tokarev	RS:X	33	31	~~35~~	32	32	27	30	31	33	30	EL	279	34
Igor Lisovenko	Laser	11	14	4	8	7	26	~~37~~	20	7	CAN	EL	93	11
Maksim Sheremetyev; Mikhail Sheremetyev	470	~~27~~	21	22	21	24	12	11	11	18	17	EL	157	20

Women

Athlete	Event	Race											Net points	Final rank
Athlete	Event	1	2	3	4	5	6	7	8	9	10	M*	Net points	Final rank
Tatiana Bazyuk	RS:X	24	23	24	19	21	20	22	21	~~25~~	24	EL	198	24
Anastasiya Chernova	Laser Radial	7	~~28~~	26	16	18	23	24	26	28	CAN	EL	168	27
Natalia Ivanova; Diana Krutskikh; Ekaterina Skudina	Yngling	3	8	12	10	~~15~~	1	6	6	CAN	CAN	12	58	6

Open

Athlete	Event	Race											Net points	Final rank
Athlete	Event	1	2	3	4	5	6	7	8	9	10	M*	Net points	Final rank
Eduard Skornyakov	Finn	~~24~~	20	17	13	8	18	12	14	CAN	CAN	EL	102	17

M = Medal race; EL = Eliminated – did not advance into the medal race; CAN = Race cancelled

== Shooting ==
Men

Athlete	Event	Qualification		Final	
Athlete	Event	Points	Rank	Points	Rank
Aleksey Alipov	Trap	121	1 Q	142 S/O 3	3rd place, bronze medalist(s)
Leonid Ekimov	10 m air pistol	582	5 Q	680.5	5
Leonid Ekimov	25 m rapid fire pistol	581	2 Q	778.2	4
Vitaly Fokeev	Double trap	130	16	Did not advance	
Pavel Gurkin	Trap	116	11	Did not advance	
Vladimir Isakov	50 m pistol	563	5 Q	659.5	3rd place, bronze medalist(s)
Artem Khadjibekov	50 m rifle prone	594	13	Did not advance	
Artem Khadjibekov	50 m rifle 3 positions	1167	14	Did not advance	
Alexei Klimov	25 m rapid fire pistol	577	8	Did not advance	
Sergei Kovalenko	50 m rifle 3 positions	1166	18	Did not advance	
Sergei Kruglov	10 m air rifle	595	5 Q	697.0	8
Vasily Mosin	Double trap	131	14	Did not advance	
Mikhail Nestruyev	10 m air pistol	575	29	Did not advance	
Mikhail Nestruyev	50 m pistol	552	24	Did not advance	
Konstantin Prikhodtchenko	10 m air rifle	595	7 Q	698.4	5
Konstantin Prikhodtchenko	50 m rifle prone	595	7 Q	699.0	5
Valeriy Shomin	Skeet	115	19	Did not advance	
Konstantin Tsuranov	Skeet	113	23	Did not advance	

Women

Athlete	Event	Qualification		Final	
Athlete	Event	Points	Rank	Points	Rank
Yuliya Alipova	25 m pistol	579	18	Did not advance	
Svetlana Demina	Skeet	66	12	Did not advance	
Olga Desyatskaya	10 m air rifle	394	18	Did not advance	
Lioubov Galkina	10 m air rifle	399	2 Q	502.1	2nd place, silver medalist(s)
Lioubov Galkina	50 m rifle 3 positions	585	8 Q	687.6	4
Tatiana Goldobina	50 m rifle 3 positions	578	18	Did not advance	
Irina Laricheva	Trap	64	9	Did not advance	
Natalia Paderina	10 m air pistol	391 OR	1 Q	489.1	2nd place, silver medalist(s)
Natalia Paderina	25 m pistol	579	19	Did not advance	
Svetlana Smirnova	10 m air pistol	383	9	Did not advance	

== Swimming ==
Men

Athlete	Event	Heat		Semifinal		Final	
Athlete	Event	Time	Rank	Time	Rank	Time	Rank
Stanislav Donets	100 m backstroke	54.18	11 Q	54.57	14	Did not advance	
Stanislav Donets	200 m backstroke	1:58.68	14 Q	1:59.87	16	Did not advance	
Evgeny Drattsev	10 km open water	—N/a				1:52:08.9	5
Vladimir Dyatchin	10 km open water	—N/a				DSQ	
Grigory Falko	200 m breaststroke	2:11.88	23	Did not advance			
Andrey Grechin	50 m freestyle	22.20	17	Did not advance			
Andrey Grechin	100 m freestyle	48.50	14 Q	48.71	14	Did not advance	
Danila Izotov	200 m freestyle	1:46.80	7 Q	1:47.24	9	Did not advance	
Dmitry Komornikov	100 m breaststroke	1:01.82	34	Did not advance			
Yevgeny Korotyshkin	100 m butterfly	52.30	24	Did not advance			
Andrey Krylov	400 m individual medley	4:14.55	13	—N/a		Did not advance	
Yevgeny Lagunov	50 m freestyle	22.30	18	Did not advance			
Yevgeny Lagunov	100 m freestyle	48.59	21	Did not advance			
Nikita Lobintsev	400 m freestyle	3:43.45	4 Q	—N/a		3:48.29	8
Nikita Lobintsev	1500 m freestyle	15:35.47	31	—N/a		Did not advance	
Yury Prilukov	400 m freestyle	3:44.82	8 Q	—N/a		3:43.97	7
Yury Prilukov	1500 m freestyle	14:41.13 EU	3 Q	—N/a		14:43.21	4
Nikolay Skvortsov	100 m butterfly	52.26	20	Did not advance			
Nikolay Skvortsov	200 m butterfly	1:55.33	6 Q	1:54.31	3 Q	1:55.14	8
Roman Sludnov	100 m breaststroke	1:00.20	7 Q	1:00.10	6 Q	59.87	6
Alexander Sukhorukov	200 m freestyle	1:47.97	19	Did not advance			
Alexander Tikhonov	200 m individual medley	2:01.21	22	Did not advance			
Alexander Tikhonov	400 m individual medley	4:16.49	16	—N/a		Did not advance	
Arkady Vyatchanin	100 m backstroke	53.64	2 Q	53.06 EU	3 Q	53.18	3rd place, bronze medalist(s)
Arkady Vyatchanin	200 m backstroke	1:56.97	4 Q	1:56.85	=8 Q	1:54.93 EU	3rd place, bronze medalist(s)
Alexey Zinovyev	200 m breaststroke	2:16.40	45	Did not advance			
Sergey Fesikov; Andrey Grechin; Andrey Kapralov; Yevgeny Lagunov	4 × 100 m freestyle relay	3:14.07	9	—N/a		Did not advance	
Danila Izotov; Yevgeny Lagunov; Nikita Lobintsev; Mikhail Polishchuk*; Alexander Sukhorukov	4 × 200 m freestyle relay	7:07.86	3 Q	—N/a		7:03.70 EU	2nd place, silver medalist(s)
Andrey Grechin; Yevgeny Korotyshkin; Yevgeny Lagunov; Nikolay Skvortsov; Roman Sludnov; Arkady Vyatchanin	4 × 100 m medley relay	3:33.59 EU	4 Q	—N/a		3:31.92 EU	4

Women

Athlete	Event	Heat		Semifinal		Final	
Athlete	Event	Time	Rank	Time	Rank	Time	Rank
Anastasia Aksenova	50 m freestyle	25.51	28	Did not advance			
Anastasia Aksenova	100 m freestyle	55.29	25	Did not advance			
Daria Belyakina	200 m freestyle	1:59.72	20	Did not advance			
Daria Belyakina	400 m freestyle	4:16.21	28	—N/a		Did not advance	
Irina Bespalova	100 m butterfly	58.92	22	Did not advance			
Yelena Bogomazova	100 m breaststroke	1:08.63	18	Did not advance			
Olga Detenyuk	200 m breaststroke	2:27.87	20	Did not advance			
Larisa Ilchenko	10 km open water	—N/a				1:59:27.7	1st place, gold medalist(s)
Svetlana Karpeeva	200 m individual medley	2:12.94	16 Q	2:13.26	13	Did not advance	
Svetlana Karpeeva	400 m individual medley	4:50.22	31	—N/a		Did not advance	
Stanislava Komarova	200 m backstroke	2:09.93	13 Q	2:10.50	14	Did not advance	
Yana Martynova	200 m butterfly	2:12.47	25	Did not advance			
Yana Martynova	400 m individual medley	4:36.25	5 Q	—N/a		4:40.04	7
Kseniya Moskvina	100 m backstroke	1:00.70	16 Q	1:01.06	14	Did not advance	
Yelena Sokolova	800 m freestyle	8:23.07	6 Q	—N/a		8:29.79	7
Natalya Sutyagina	100 m butterfly	58.32	11 Q	59.07	14	Did not advance	
Yuliya Yefimova	100 m breaststroke	1:06.08 EU	2 Q	1:07.50	5 Q	1:07.43	4
Yuliya Yefimova	200 m breaststroke	2:25.07	8 Q	2:24.00	6 Q	2:23.76	5
Anastasia Zuyeva	100 m backstroke	59.61	3 Q	59.77	4 Q	59.40	5
Anastasia Zuyeva	200 m backstroke	2:09.01	5 Q	2:09.07	8 Q	2:07.88	4
Anastasia Aksenova; Daria Belyakina; Svetlana Karpeeva; Yelena Sokolova	4 × 100 m freestyle relay	3:42.52	12	—N/a		Did not advance	
Anastasia Aksenova; Kseniya Moskvina; Natalya Sutyagina; Yuliya Yefimova; Anastasia Zuyeva	4 × 100 m medley relay	3:59.66	5 Q	—N/a		3:57.84	5

== Synchronized swimming ==
Athlete	Event	Technical routine		Free routine (preliminary)			Free routine (final)		
Athlete	Event	Points	Rank	Points	Total (technical + free)	Rank	Points	Total (technical + free)	Rank
Anastasia Davydova; Anastasiya Yermakova	Duet	49.334	1	49.500	98.834	1 Q	49.917	99.251	1st place, gold medalist(s)
Anastasia Davydova; Anastasiya Yermakova; Maria Gromova; Natalia Ishchenko; Elvira Khasyanova; Olga Kuzhela; Yelena Ovchinnikova; Anna Shorina; Svetlana Romashina	Team	49.500	1	—N/a			50.000	99.500	1st place, gold medalist(s)

== Table tennis ==
Singles

Athlete	Event	Preliminary round	Round 1	Round 2	Round 3	Round 4	Quarterfinals	Semifinals	Final / BM	
Athlete	Event	Opposition Result	Opposition Result	Opposition Result	Opposition Result	Opposition Result	Opposition Result	Opposition Result	Opposition Result	Rank
Fedor Kuzmin	Men's singles	Bye	Bobocica (ITA); L 1–4	Did not advance						
Alexey Smirnov	Men's singles	Bye		Doan (VIE); W 4–1	Kan (JPN); L 1–4	Did not advance				
Oksana Fadeyeva	Women's singles	Bye	Stefanova (ITA); L 0–4	Did not advance						
Svetlana Ganina	Women's singles	Bye	Sang Xu (AUS); L WO	Did not advance						
Irina Kotikhina	Women's singles	Bye	Miao (AUS); L 3–4	Did not advance						

Team

Athlete	Event	Group round		Semifinals	Bronze playoff 1	Bronze playoff 2	Bronze medal	Final	
Athlete	Event	Opposition Result	Rank	Opposition Result	Opposition Result	Opposition Result	Opposition Result	Opposition Result	Rank
Fedor Kuzmin; Dmitry Mazunov; Alexey Smirnov	Men's team	Group D Japan; L 0 – 3 Hong Kong; L 1 – 3 Nigeria; L 2 – 3	4	Did not advance					

== Tennis ==
Men

Athlete	Event	Round of 64	Round of 32	Round of 16	Quarterfinals	Semifinals	Final / BM	
Athlete	Event	Opposition Score	Opposition Score	Opposition Score	Opposition Score	Opposition Score	Opposition Score	Rank
Igor Andreev	Singles	Querrey (USA); W 6–4, 6–4	Llodra (FRA); W 6–4, 3–6, 6–1	Nadal (ESP); L 4–6, 2–6	Did not advance			
Nikolay Davydenko	Singles	Gulbis (LAT); W 6–4, 6–2	Mathieu (FRA); L 5–7, 3–6	Did not advance				
Dmitry Tursunov	Singles	Federer (SUI); L 4–6, 2–6	Did not advance					
Mikhail Youzhny	Singles	Vaněk (CZE); W 6–4, 6–1	Johansson (SWE); W 7–5, 6–2	Đokovic (SRB); L 6–7^{(3–7)}, 3–6	Did not advance			
Igor Andreev; Nikolay Davydenko	Doubles	—N/a	Blake / Querrey (USA); W 6–3, 6–4	Darcis / Rochus (BEL); W 7–6^{(8–6)}, 6–2	Clément / Llodra (FRA); L 2–6, 7–6^{(7–4)}, 4–6	Did not advance		
Dmitry Tursunov; Mikhail Youzhny	Doubles	—N/a	González / Massú (CHI); W 7–6^{(7–5)}, 6–4	Federer / Wawrinka (SUI); L 4–6, 3–6	Did not advance			

Women

Athlete	Event	Round of 64	Round of 32	Round of 16	Quarterfinals	Semifinals	Final / BM	
Athlete	Event	Opposition Score	Opposition Score	Opposition Score	Opposition Score	Opposition Score	Opposition Score	Rank
Elena Dementieva	Singles	K Bondarenko (UKR); W 6–1, 6–4	Arvidsson (SWE); W 6–3, 6–4	Wozniacki (DEN); W 7–6^{(7–3)}, 6–2	S Williams (USA); W 3–6, 6–4, 6–3	Zvonareva (RUS); W 6–3, 7–6^{(7–3)}	Safina (RUS); W 3–6, 7–5, 6–3	1st place, gold medalist(s)
Svetlana Kuznetsova	Singles	Li N (CHN); L 6–7^{(5–7)}, 4–6	Did not advance					
Dinara Safina	Singles	Santangelo (ITA); W 6–3, 7–6^{(7–1)}	Martínez Sánchez (ESP); W 7–6^{(7–3)}, 6–1	Zheng J (CHN); W 6–4, 6–3	Janković (SRB); W 6–2, 5–7, 6–3	Li N (CHN); W 7–6^{(7–3)}, 7–5	Dementieva (RUS); L 6–3, 5–7, 3–6	2nd place, silver medalist(s)
Vera Zvonareva	Singles	Yan Z (CHN); W 6–0, 6–2	Pe'er (ISR); W 6–3, 7–6^{(7–4)}	Schiavone (ITA); W 7–6^{(7–4)}, 6–4	Bammer (AUT); W 6–3, 3–6, 6–3	Dementieva (RUS); L 3–6, 6–7^{(7–3)}	Li N (CHN); W 6–0, 7–5	3rd place, bronze medalist(s)
Svetlana Kuznetsova; Dinara Safina	Doubles	—N/a	Santangelo / Vinci (ITA); W 6–1, 3–6, 7–5	Mirza / Rao (IND); W 6–4, 6–4	Yan Z / Zheng J (CHN); L 3–6, 7–5, 8–10	Did not advance		
Elena Vesnina; Vera Zvonareva	Doubles	—N/a	Llagostera Vives / Martínez Sánchez (ESP); W 2–6, 6–1, 6–3	Dulko / Jozami (ARG); W 6–2, 6–3	S Williams / V Williams (USA); L 4–6, 0–6	Did not advance		

== Triathlon ==
Athlete	Event	Swim (1.5 km)	Trans 1	Bike (40 km)	Trans 2	Run (10 km)	Total Time	Rank
Alexander Bryukhankov	Men's	18:10	0:30	59:08	0:33	33:01	1:51:22.59	24
Dmitry Polyanski	Men's	18:15	0:27	59:07	0:29	32:53	1:51:11.61	22
Igor Sysoyev	Men's	18:02	0:32	59:15	0:29	31:41	1:49:59.38	9
Irina Abysova	Women's	20:26	0:30	Did not finish				
Olga Zausaylova	Women's	20:58	0:30	1:26:52	0:31	39:01	2:06:24.26	36

== Volleyball ==
=== Beach ===
Athlete	Event	Preliminary round	Standing	Round of 16	Quarterfinals	Semifinals	Final / BM	
Athlete	Event	Opposition Score	Standing	Opposition Score	Opposition Score	Opposition Score	Opposition Score	Rank
Dmitri Barsuk; Igor Kolodinsky	Men's	Pool D Doppler – Gartmayer (AUT); L 1 – 2 (16–21, 21–18, 14–16); Amore – Lione (ITA); W 2 – 0 (21–17, 21–13); Araújo - Luiz (BRA); L 0 – 2 (22–24, 17–21)	3 Q	Emanuel – Ricardo (BRA); L 1 – 2 (21–18, 23–25, 12–15)	Did not advance			
Alexandra Shiryayeva; Natalya Uryadova	Women's	Pool C Barnett – Cook (AUS); L 1 – 2 (8–21, 21–19, 12–15); Ana Paula – Larissa (BRA); L 1 – 2 (21–19, 12–21, 13–15); Rtvelo – Saka (GEO); L 1 – 2 (21–10, 20–22, 12–15	4	Did not advance				

=== Indoor ===
Russia qualified both a men's team and a women's team in the indoor tournaments. The men's team won all their group games but one, thereby advancing to the final round. There, they won the quarterfinal, lost the semifinal, and won the bronze medal game. The women's team won three games and lost two, and also advanced to the final round, where they lost the quarterfinal.

==== Men's tournament ====
Roster

The following is the Russian roster in the men's volleyball tournament of the 2008 Summer Olympics.

Head Coach: Vladimir Alekno

No.	Name	Date of birth	Height	Weight	Spike	Block	2008 club
1	Aleksandr Korneev	11 September 1980	2.00 m (6 ft 7 in)	96 kg (212 lb)	348 cm (137 in)	339 cm (133 in)	(Russia) Zenit Kazan
2	Semen Poltavskiy	8 February 1981	2.05 m (6 ft 9 in)	89 kg (196 lb)	346 cm (136 in)	338 cm (133 in)	(Russia) Dynamo Moscow
3	Aleksandr Kosarev	30 September 1977	2.03 m (6 ft 8 in)	95 kg (209 lb)	339 cm (133 in)	328 cm (129 in)	(Russia) Lokomotiv-Belogorie
6	Sergey Grankin	21 January 1985	1.95 m (6 ft 5 in)	87 kg (192 lb)	351 cm (138 in)	320 cm (130 in)	(Russia) Dynamo Moscow
8	Sergey Tetyukhin	23 September 1975	1.97 m (6 ft 6 in)	89 kg (196 lb)	345 cm (136 in)	338 cm (133 in)	(Russia) Lokomotiv-Belogorie
9	Vadim Khamuttskikh (c)	26 November 1969	1.96 m (6 ft 5 in)	85 kg (187 lb)	342 cm (135 in)	331 cm (130 in)	(Russia) Lokomotiv-Belogorie
10	Yury Berezhko	27 January 1984	1.98 m (6 ft 6 in)	90 kg (200 lb)	346 cm (136 in)	338 cm (133 in)	(Russia) Dynamo Moscow
13	Aleksey Ostapenko	26 May 1986	2.08 m (6 ft 10 in)	94 kg (207 lb)	355 cm (140 in)	340 cm (130 in)	(Russia) Dynamo Moscow
15	Aleksandr Volkov	14 February 1985	2.10 m (6 ft 11 in)	90 kg (200 lb)	355 cm (140 in)	335 cm (132 in)	(Russia) Dynamo Moscow
16	Aleksey Verbov (L)	31 January 1982	1.83 m (6 ft 0 in)	77 kg (170 lb)	315 cm (124 in)	310 cm (120 in)	(Russia) Iskra Odintsovo
17	Maxim Mikhaylov	19 March 1988	2.03 m (6 ft 8 in)	85 kg (187 lb)	345 cm (136 in)	330 cm (130 in)	(Russia) Yaroslavich
18	Aleksey Kuleshov	24 February 1979	2.06 m (6 ft 9 in)	96 kg (212 lb)	353 cm (139 in)	344 cm (135 in)	(Russia) Iskra Odintsovo

Preliminary round

Pos	Team	Pld	W	L	Pts	SPW	SPL	SPR	SW	SL	SR	Qualification
1	Brazil	5	4	1	9	427	373	1.145	13	4	3.250	Quarterfinals
2	Russia	5	4	1	9	496	447	1.110	14	7	2.000	Quarterfinals
3	Poland	5	4	1	9	434	404	1.074	12	6	2.000	Quarterfinals
4	Serbia	5	2	3	7	440	439	1.002	9	10	0.900	Quarterfinals
5	Germany	5	1	4	6	418	440	0.950	6	12	0.500	
6	Egypt	5	0	5	5	267	379	0.704	0	15	0.000	

10 August 2008; 10:00	Serbia	1–3	Russia	Beijing Institute of Technology Gymnasium, Beijing; Attendance: 3,100; Referees: Bela Hobor (HUN), Osamu Sakaide (JPN)
10 August 2008; 10:00	(25–20, 21–25, 22–25, 14–25) result statistics			Beijing Institute of Technology Gymnasium, Beijing; Attendance: 3,100; Referees: Bela Hobor (HUN), Osamu Sakaide (JPN)

12 August 2008; 10:00	Russia	3–2	Germany	Beijing Institute of Technology Gymnasium, Beijing; Attendance: 3,500; Referees: Patrick Deregnaucourt (FRA), Bela Hobor (HUN)
12 August 2008; 10:00	(25–27, 25–21, 21–25, 25–23, 16–14) result statistics			Beijing Institute of Technology Gymnasium, Beijing; Attendance: 3,500; Referees: Patrick Deregnaucourt (FRA), Bela Hobor (HUN)

14 August 2008; 12:30	Brazil	1–3	Russia	Capital Indoor Stadium, Beijing; Attendance: 12,000; Referees: Victor Rodriguez (PUR), Ning Wang (CHN)
14 August 2008; 12:30	(25–22, 24–26, 29–31, 19–25) result statistics			Capital Indoor Stadium, Beijing; Attendance: 12,000; Referees: Victor Rodriguez (PUR), Ning Wang (CHN)

16 August 2008; 12:00	Russia	3–0	Egypt	Beijing Institute of Technology Gymnasium, Beijing; Attendance: 3,200; Referees: Jiang Liu (CHN), Ibrahim Al-Naama (QAT)
16 August 2008; 12:00	(25–19, 25–14, 25–18) result statistics			Beijing Institute of Technology Gymnasium, Beijing; Attendance: 3,200; Referees: Jiang Liu (CHN), Ibrahim Al-Naama (QAT)

18 August 2008; 12:30	Poland	3–2	Russia	Capital Indoor Stadium, Beijing; Attendance: 12,000; Referees: Frans Loderus (NED), Frank Leuthauser (GER)
18 August 2008; 12:30	(17–25, 26–24, 24–26, 25–23, 15–12) result statistics			Capital Indoor Stadium, Beijing; Attendance: 12,000; Referees: Frans Loderus (NED), Frank Leuthauser (GER)

Quarterfinal

20 August 2008; 10:00	Bulgaria	1–3	Russia	Capital Indoor Stadium, Beijing; Attendance: 11,500; Referees: Bela Hobor (HUN), Frans Loderus (NED)
20 August 2008; 10:00	(25–20, 16–25, 22–25, 21–25) result statistics			Capital Indoor Stadium, Beijing; Attendance: 11,500; Referees: Bela Hobor (HUN), Frans Loderus (NED)

Semifinal

22 August 2008; 12:35	United States	3–2	Russia	Capital Indoor Stadium, Beijing; Attendance: 12,500; Referees: Osamu Sakaide (JPN), Ibrahim Al-Naama (QAT)
22 August 2008; 12:35	(25–22, 25–21, 25–27, 22–25, 15–13) result statistics			Capital Indoor Stadium, Beijing; Attendance: 12,500; Referees: Osamu Sakaide (JPN), Ibrahim Al-Naama (QAT)

Bronze medal match

24 August 2008; 10:00	(bronze) Russia	3–0	Italy	Capital Indoor Stadium, Beijing; Attendance: 11,500; Referees: Frank Leuthauser (GER), Dejan Jovanovic (SRB)
24 August 2008; 10:00	(25–22, 25–19, 25–23) result statistics			Capital Indoor Stadium, Beijing; Attendance: 11,500; Referees: Frank Leuthauser (GER), Dejan Jovanovic (SRB)

==== Women's tournament ====
Roster

The following is the Russian roster in the women's volleyball tournament of the 2008 Summer Olympics.

Head Coach: (Italy) Giovanni Caprara

№	Name	Date of birth	Height	Weight	Spike	Block	2008 club
1	Maria Borodakova	8 March 1986	1.90 m (6 ft 3 in)	80 kg (180 lb)	312 cm (123 in)	308 cm (121 in)	(Russia) Dynamo Moscow
3	Natalia Alimova	9 December 1978	1.89 m (6 ft 2 in)	78 kg (172 lb)	315 cm (124 in)	308 cm (121 in)	(Russia) Leningradka
4	Olga Fateeva	4 May 1985	1.90 m (6 ft 3 in)	72 kg (159 lb)	310 cm (120 in)	303 cm (119 in)	(Russia) Zarechie Odintsovo
5	Lioubov Sokolova	4 December 1977	1.92 m (6 ft 4 in)	72 kg (159 lb)	315 cm (124 in)	307 cm (121 in)	(Russia) Zarechie Odintsovo
6	Yelena Godina	17 September 1977	1.96 m (6 ft 5 in)	72 kg (159 lb)	317 cm (125 in)	310 cm (120 in)	(Russia) Dynamo Moscow
8	Yevgeniya Estes	17 July 1975	1.92 m (6 ft 4 in)	75 kg (165 lb)	315 cm (124 in)	306 cm (120 in)	(Russia) Uralochka
11	Yekaterina Gamova	17 October 1980	2.04 m (6 ft 8 in)	80 kg (180 lb)	321 cm (126 in)	310 cm (120 in)	(Russia) Dynamo Moscow
12	Marina Sheshenina (c)	26 June 1985	1.78 m (5 ft 10 in)	62 kg (137 lb)	302 cm (119 in)	295 cm (116 in)	(Russia) Uralochka
14	Ekaterina Kabeshova (L)	5 August 1986	1.72 m (5 ft 8 in)	62 kg (137 lb)	298 cm (117 in)	290 cm (110 in)	(Russia) Leningradka
15	Aleksandra Pasynkova	14 April 1987	1.90 m (6 ft 3 in)	75 kg (165 lb)	292 cm (115 in)	287 cm (113 in)	(Russia) Uralochka
16	Yulia Merkulova	17 February 1984	2.02 m (6 ft 8 in)	75 kg (165 lb)	317 cm (125 in)	308 cm (121 in)	(Russia) Zarechie Odintsovo
18	Marina Akulova	13 December 1985	1.78 m (5 ft 10 in)	70 kg (150 lb)	303 cm (119 in)	290 cm (110 in)	(Russia) Samorodok Khabarovsk

Preliminary round

Pos	Team	Pld	W	L	Pts	SPW	SPL	SPR	SW	SL	SR	Qualification
1	Brazil	5	5	0	10	377	226	1.668	15	0	MAX	Quarterfinals
2	Italy	5	4	1	9	372	315	1.181	12	4	3.000	Quarterfinals
3	Russia	5	3	2	8	353	312	1.131	10	6	1.667	Quarterfinals
4	Serbia	5	2	3	7	343	349	0.983	6	10	0.600	Quarterfinals
5	Kazakhstan	5	1	4	6	323	404	0.800	4	13	0.308	
6	Algeria	5	0	5	5	230	392	0.587	1	15	0.067	

9 August 2008; 10:00	Italy	3–1	Russia	Beijing Institute of Technology Gymnasium; Attendance: 3,100; Referees: Frank Leuthauser (Germany), Karin Zahorcova (Czech Republic)
9 August 2008; 10:00	(25–20, 17–25, 25–16, 25–23) result statistics			Beijing Institute of Technology Gymnasium; Attendance: 3,100; Referees: Frank Leuthauser (Germany), Karin Zahorcova (Czech Republic)

11 August 2008; 14:30	Brazil	3–0	Russia	Capital Indoor Stadium; Attendance: 12,000; Referees: Osamu Sakaide (Japan), Wang Ning (China)
11 August 2008; 14:30	(25–14, 25–14, 25–16) result statistics			Capital Indoor Stadium; Attendance: 12,000; Referees: Osamu Sakaide (Japan), Wang Ning (China)

13 August 2008; 12:30	Russia	3–0	Kazakhstan	Capital Indoor Stadium; Attendance: 12,000; Referees: Liu Jiang (China), Patricia Salvatore (United States)
13 August 2008; 12:30	(25–19, 25–18, 25–11) result statistics			Capital Indoor Stadium; Attendance: 12,000; Referees: Liu Jiang (China), Patricia Salvatore (United States)

15 August 2008; 10:00	Algeria	0–3	Russia	Beijing Institute of Technology Gymnasium; Attendance: 3,500; Referees: Patricia Salvatore (United States), Osamu Sakaide (Japan)
15 August 2008; 10:00	(11–25, 19–25, 10–25) result statistics			Beijing Institute of Technology Gymnasium; Attendance: 3,500; Referees: Patricia Salvatore (United States), Osamu Sakaide (Japan)

17 August 2008; 22:00	Russia	3–0	Serbia	Capital Indoor Stadium; Attendance: 7,000; Referees: Osamu Sakaide (Japan), Karin Zahorcova (Czech Republic)
17 August 2008; 22:00	(25–21, 25–16, 25–20) result statistics			Capital Indoor Stadium; Attendance: 7,000; Referees: Osamu Sakaide (Japan), Karin Zahorcova (Czech Republic)

Quarterfinal

19 August 2008; 20:00	China	3–0	Russia	Capital Indoor Stadium; Attendance: 13,000; Referees: Humberto Salas (Mexico), Victor Manuel Rodriguez (Puerto Rico)
19 August 2008; 20:00	(25–22, 27–25, 25–19) result statistics			Capital Indoor Stadium; Attendance: 13,000; Referees: Humberto Salas (Mexico), Victor Manuel Rodriguez (Puerto Rico)

== Water polo ==
=== Women's tournament ===
Roster

The following is the Russian roster in the women's water polo tournament of the 2008 Summer Olympics.

№	Name	Pos.	Height	Weight	Date of birth	Club
1	Valentina Vorontsova	GK	1.70 m (5 ft 7 in)	65 kg (143 lb)	26 July 1982	(Russia) Kinef Kirishi
2	Natalia Shepelina	D	1.67 m (5 ft 6 in)	63 kg (139 lb)	24 February 1981	(Russia) Uralochka Zlatoust
3	Ekaterina Prokofyeva	D	1.66 m (5 ft 5 in)	63 kg (139 lb)	13 March 1991	(Russia) Yunost Volgograd
4	Sofia Konukh	CB	1.73 m (5 ft 8 in)	61 kg (134 lb)	9 March 1980	(Russia) Kinef Kirishi
5	Alena Vylegzhanina	CB	1.75 m (5 ft 9 in)	70 kg (150 lb)	14 August 1987	(Russia) Uralochka Zlatoust
6	Nadezda Glyzina	D	1.70 m (5 ft 7 in)	65 kg (143 lb)	20 May 1988	(Russia) Kinef Kirishi
7	Ekaterina Pantyulina	D	1.74 m (5 ft 9 in)	62 kg (137 lb)	6 October 1989	(Russia) Kinef Kirishi
8	Evgenia Soboleva	CB	1.78 m (5 ft 10 in)	70 kg (150 lb)	26 August 1988	(Russia) Kinef Kirishi
9	Oleksandra Karpovich	CF	1.60 m (5 ft 3 in)	55 kg (121 lb)	6 June 1986	(Russia) SKIF Moscow
10	Olga Belyaeva	CF	1.73 m (5 ft 8 in)	64 kg (141 lb)	18 March 1985	(Russia) Kinef Kirishi
11	Elena Smurova	CB	1.66 m (5 ft 5 in)	60 kg (130 lb)	18 January 1974	(Russia) Kinef Kirishi
12	Olga Turova	CF	1.75 m (5 ft 9 in)	60 kg (130 lb)	13 March 1983	(Russia) Yunost Volgograd
13	Evgeniya Protsenko	GK	1.75 m (5 ft 9 in)	64 kg (141 lb)	25 November 1983	(Russia) Uralochka Zlatoust

Head coach: Alexander Kleymenov

Group play

Team	Pld	W	D	L	GF	GA	GD	Pts	Qualification
United States	3	2	1	0	33	27	+6	5	Qualified for semifinals
Italy	3	2	1	0	28	26	+2	5	Qualified for quarterfinals
China	3	1	0	2	33	33	0	2	Qualified for quarterfinals
Russia	3	0	0	3	26	34	−8	0	Will play for places 7th–8th

All times are China Standard Time (UTC+8).

11 August 2008; 14:20	Report	Russia	8–9	Italy	Ying Tung Natatorium, Beijing; Referees: Gaetan Turcotte (CAN), Nikolaos Argyros (GRE)
11 August 2008; 14:20	Report	Score by quarters: 3–3, 2–1, 2–3, 1–2			Ying Tung Natatorium, Beijing; Referees: Gaetan Turcotte (CAN), Nikolaos Argyros (GRE)
11 August 2008; 14:20	Report	Smurova 2	Goals	Miceli 2, di Mario 2	Ying Tung Natatorium, Beijing; Referees: Gaetan Turcotte (CAN), Nikolaos Argyros (GRE)

13 August 2008; 17:00	Report	Russia	11–13	China	Ying Tung Natatorium, Beijing; Referees: Gaetan Turcotte (CAN), Torsten Bock (GER)
13 August 2008; 17:00	Report	Score by quarters: 2–3, 5–4, 3–1, 1–5			Ying Tung Natatorium, Beijing; Referees: Gaetan Turcotte (CAN), Torsten Bock (GER)
13 August 2008; 17:00	Report	Pantyulina 3, Vylegzhanina 2	Goals	Sun Yu. 4, Gao 2, Sun H. 2	Ying Tung Natatorium, Beijing; Referees: Gaetan Turcotte (CAN), Torsten Bock (GER)

15 August 2008; 14:20	Report	Russia	7–12	United States	Ying Tung Natatorium, Beijing; Referees: Jaime Moliner Molins (ESP), Ahmet Erhan Tulga (TUR)
15 August 2008; 14:20	Report	Score by quarters: 0–5, 3–2, 2–4, 2–1			Ying Tung Natatorium, Beijing; Referees: Jaime Moliner Molins (ESP), Ahmet Erhan Tulga (TUR)
15 August 2008; 14:20	Report	Konukh 2, Turova 2	Goals	Golda 3, Villa 2, Gregorka 2	Ying Tung Natatorium, Beijing; Referees: Jaime Moliner Molins (ESP), Ahmet Erhan Tulga (TUR)

Classification round (7th–8th place)

17 August 2008; 13:00	Report	Russia	12–6	Greece	Ying Tung Natatorium, Beijing; Referees: Stephen Knights (NZL), Guy Pinker (RSA)
17 August 2008; 13:00	Report	Score by quarters: 3–2, 4–1, 3–1, 2–2			Ying Tung Natatorium, Beijing; Referees: Stephen Knights (NZL), Guy Pinker (RSA)
17 August 2008; 13:00	Report	Shepelina 3, Konukh 3, Pantyulina 2, Belyaeva 2	Goals	Roumpesi 4	Ying Tung Natatorium, Beijing; Referees: Stephen Knights (NZL), Guy Pinker (RSA)

== Weightlifting ==
Men

Athlete	Event	Snatch		Clean & Jerk		Total	Rank
Athlete	Event	Result	Rank	Result	Rank	Total	Rank
Oleg Perepetchenov	−77 kg	162	5	192	9	354	5
Khadzhimurat Akkayev	−94 kg	185	1	217	4	402	DSQ
Roman Konstantinov	−94 kg	175	8	212	8	387	8
Dmitry Klokov	−105 kg	193	3	230	3	423	2nd place, silver medalist(s)
Dmitry Lapikov	−105 kg	190	5	230	2	420	DSQ
Evgeny Chigishev	+105 kg	210	1	250	2	460	2nd place, silver medalist(s)

Women

Athlete	Event	Snatch		Clean & Jerk		Total	Rank
Athlete	Event	Result	Rank	Result	Rank	Total	Rank
Marina Shainova	−58 kg	98	5	129	3	227	DSQ
Svetlana Tsarukayeva	−63 kg	~~107~~	DNF	—	—	—	DNF
Oxana Slivenko	−69 kg	115	2	140	2	255	1st place, gold medalist(s)
Nadezhda Evstyukhina	−75 kg	117	3	147	2	264	DSQ

== Wrestling ==
Key:

- VT - Victory by Fall.
- PP - Decision by Points - the loser with technical points.
- PO - Decision by Points - the loser without technical points.

Men's freestyle

Athlete	Event	Qualification	Round of 16	Quarterfinal	Semifinal	Repechage 1	Repechage 2	Final / BM	
Athlete	Event	Opposition Result	Opposition Result	Opposition Result	Opposition Result	Opposition Result	Opposition Result	Opposition Result	Rank
Besik Kudukhov	−55 kg	Bye	Naranbaatar (MGL); W 3–0 ^{PO}	Dabbaghi (IRI); W 3–0 ^{PO}	Matsunaga (JPN); L 0–5 ^{VT}	Bye		Mansurov (UZB); W 3–0 ^{PO}	3rd place, bronze medalist(s)
Mavlet Batirov	−60 kg	Huseynov (AZE); W 3–0 ^{PO}	Quintana (CUB); W 3–1 ^{PP}	Ramazanov (MKD); W 3–0 ^{PO}	Mohammadi (IRI); W 3–0 ^{PO}	Bye		Fedoryshyn (UKR); W 3–1 ^{PP}	1st place, gold medalist(s)
Irbek Farniev	−66 kg	Markosyan (ARM); W 3–1 ^{PP}	Batzorig (MGL); W 3–1 ^{PP}	Spiridonov (KAZ); L 1–3 ^{PP}	Did not advance				7
Buvaisar Saitiev	−74 kg	Cho B-K (KOR); W 3–1 ^{PP}	Gulhan (TUR); W 3–0 ^{PO}	Fundora (CUB); W 3–1 ^{PP}	Terziev (BUL); W 5–0 ^{VT}	Bye		Tigiev (UZB); W 3–1 ^{PP}	1st place, gold medalist(s)
Georgy Ketoev	−84 kg	Wang Y (CHN); W 3–1 ^{PP}	Sokhiev (UZB); W 3–1 ^{PP}	Temrezov (AZE); W 3–1 ^{PP}	Mindorashvili (GEO); L 0–5 ^{VT}	Bye		Bichinashvili (GER); W 3–1 ^{PP}	3rd place, bronze medalist(s)
Shirvani Muradov	−96 kg	Bye	Tibilov (UKR); W 3–1 ^{PP}	Koç (TUR); W 3–0 ^{PO}	Gazyumov (AZE); W 3–1 ^{PP}	Bye		Tigiyev (KAZ); W 3–0 ^{PO}	1st place, gold medalist(s)
Bakhtiyar Akhmedov	−120 kg	Boyadzhiev (BUL); W 3–0 ^{PO}	Masoumi (IRI); W 5–0 ^{VT}	Mocco (USA); W 3–1 ^{PP}	Mutalimov (KAZ); W 3–0 ^{PO}	Bye		Taymazov (UZB); L 0–3 ^{PO}	1st place, gold medalist(s)

Men's Greco-Roman

Athlete	Event	Qualification	Round of 16	Quarterfinal	Semifinal	Repechage 1	Repechage 2	Final / BM	
Athlete	Event	Opposition Result	Opposition Result	Opposition Result	Opposition Result	Opposition Result	Opposition Result	Opposition Result	Rank
Nazyr Mankiev	−55 kg	Hafizov (UZB); W 3–1 ^{PP}	Fris (SRB); W 3–0 ^{PO}	Sourian (IRI); W 3–1 ^{PP}	Park E-C (KOR); W 3–1 ^{PP}	Bye		Bayramov (AZE); W 3–1 ^{PP}	1st place, gold medalist(s)
Islambek Albiev	−60 kg	Bye	Sucu (TUR); W 3–0 ^{PO}	Monzón (CUB); W 3–0 ^{PO}	Tyumenbayev (KGZ); W 3–0 ^{PO}	Bye		Rahimov (AZE); W 3–0 ^{PO}	1st place, gold medalist(s)
Sergey Kovalenko	−66 kg	Bye	Serir (ALG); W 3–0 ^{PO}	Gergov (BUL); L 1–3 ^{PP}	Did not advance				7
Varteres Samurgashev	−74 kg	Madsen (DEN); W 3–1 ^{PP}	Abdulov (AZE); W 5–0 ^{VT}	Bácsi (HUN); L 1–3 ^{PP}	Did not advance				7
Aleksey Mishin	−84 kg	Bye	Samokhin (KAZ); W 3–1 ^{PP}	Minguzzi (ITA); L 1–3 ^{PP}	Did not advance	Bye	Noumonvi (FRA); L 1–3 ^{PP}	Did not advance	9
Aslanbek Khushtov	−96 kg	Mambetov (KAZ); W 3–0 ^{PO}	Timoncini (ITA); W 3–0 ^{PO}	Ežerskis (LTU); W 3–0 ^{PO}	Švec (CZE); W 5–0 ^{VT}	Bye		Englich (GER)} W 3–0 ^{PO}	1st place, gold medalist(s)
Khasan Baroyev	−120 kg	Bye	Hashemzadeh (IRI); W 3–0 ^{PO}	Mizgaitis (LTU); W 3–1 ^{PP}	Szczepaniak (FRA); W 3–1 ^{PP}	Bye		López (CUB); L 1–3 ^{PP}	DSQ

Women's freestyle

Athlete	Event	Qualification	Round of 16	Quarterfinal	Semifinal	Repechage 1	Repechage 2	Final / BM	
Athlete	Event	Opposition Result	Opposition Result	Opposition Result	Opposition Result	Opposition Result	Opposition Result	Opposition Result	Rank
Zamira Rakhmanova	−48 kg	Bye	Boubryemm (FRA); L 1–3 ^{PP}	Did not advance					11
Natalia Golts	−55 kg	—N/a	Komarova (AZE); W 3–0 ^{PO}	Yoshida (JPN); L 1–3 ^{PP}	Did not advance	Bye	Nerell (SWE); L 1–3 ^{PP}	Did not advance	8
Alena Kartashova	−63 kg	Bye	Shalygina (KAZ); W 3–0 ^{PO}	Vaseva (BUL); W 3–1 ^{PP}	Legrand (FRA); W 3–1 ^{PP}	Bye		Icho (JPN); L 0–3 ^{PO}	2nd place, silver medalist(s)
Elena Perepelkina	−72 kg	—N/a	Hamaguchi (JPN); L 1–3 ^{PP}	Did not advance					11

== See also ==
- Russia at the 2008 Summer Paralympics
