= Sacchin =

Sacchin may refer to:

- Christopher Sacchin (born 1983), Italian swimmer
- Sacchin, a member of Maria (Japanese band)
- A nickname for Sayoko Nanamori, a character from RahXephon
- A nickname for Satsuki Yumizuka, a character from Tsukihime
