= Mamontovas =

Mamontovas is the masculine form of a Lithuanian family name. The feminine forms are Mamontovienė (married woman) and Mamontovaitė (maiden name).

The surname corresponds to the Russian-language surname Mamontov.

It may refer to:

- Andrius Mamontovas (born 1967), Lithuanian rock musician
