= Dobroskok =

Dobroskok (Russian: Доброскок) is a gender-neutral Slavic surname. Notable people with the surname Dobroskok include:

- Aleksandr Dobroskok (born 1982), Russian diver
- Dmitry Dobroskok (born 1984), Russian diver, brother of Aleksandr
