= Diving at the 2008 Summer Olympics – Men's synchronized 10 metre platform =

Men's synchronized 10 metre platform at the Games of the XXIX Olympiad
- Venue: Beijing National Aquatics Center
- Date: 11 August

Medalists
1st place, gold medalist(s)		Lin Yue; Huo Liang	China
2nd place, silver medalist(s)		Patrick Hausding; Sascha Klein	Germany
3rd place, bronze medalist(s)		Gleb Galperin; Dmitriy Dobroskok	Russia

Men's synchronized 10 metre platform competition at the Beijing 2008 Summer Olympics was held on August 11 at the Beijing National Aquatics Center.

Like all other synchronized diving competitions at the Olympics, only one round of competition was held. Eight pairs of divers competed. Each pair performed six dives, with both divers from the pair diving at the same time.

Nine judges evaluated each dive, with two each judging the performance of the two divers (the execution judges) and five judges evaluating the synchronization of the pair (the synchronization judges). For each dive, four of the nine scores are ignored - the highest and lowest execution scores, and the highest and lowest synchronization scores. The remaining five scores are summed, multiplied by the dive's degree of difficulty, and then multiplied by 0.6 to get a final score for the dive.

== Results ==
Rank	Nation	Dives						Total
Rank	Nation	1	2	3	4	5	6	Total
1st place, gold medalist(s)	China; Lin Yue; Huo Liang	57.00	59.40	89.76	86.40	86.70	88.92	468.18
2nd place, silver medalist(s)	Germany; Patrick Hausding; Sascha Klein	52.80	54.00	86.70	71.28	88.74	96.90	450.42
3rd place, bronze medalist(s)	Russia; Gleb Galperin; Dmitriy Dobroskok	53.40	56.40	86.70	88.32	70.38	90.06	445.26
4	Australia; Mathew Helm; Robert Newbery	52.80	53.40	84.66	72.00	89.64	92.34	444.84
5	United States; David Boudia; Thomas Finchum	51.60	54.60	80.58	82.62	77.76	93.48	440.64
6	Colombia; Víctor Ortega; Juan Urán	46.80	52.80	82.62	79.68	81.18	80.58	423.66
7	Cuba; José Guerra; Erick Fornaris	49.80	48.00	79.56	71.04	75.48	85.50	409.38
8	Great Britain; Blake Aldridge; Tom Daley	52.80	50.40	72.96	75.24	77.52	79.56	408.48
