= Mamontov =

Mamontov (Russian: Мамонтов) is a Russian surname, derived from the Orthodox baptismal name Mamont, Mamant (Mammes, Greek: Μάμας, Μάμαντος). The feminine form is Mamontova.

Notable people with the surname include:

- Andrey Mamontov, Belarusian diver
- Konstantin Mamontov, anti-Bolshevik Cossack general in Russian Civil War
- Savva Mamontov, Russian industrialist, merchant, entrepreneur and patron of the arts.

== See also ==
- Asteroid 7381 Mamontov
