= Choe Hyong-gil =

North Korean diver (born 1976)

Personal information
- Native name: 최형길
- Nationality: North Korean
- Born: 11 September 1976 (age 49)
- Height: 159 cm (5 ft 3 in)
- Weight: 54 kg (119 lb)

Sport
- Sport: Diving
Medal record
Men's diving
Representing North Korea
Summer Universiade
Silver medal – second place	2001 Beijing	Synchronized platform
Silver medal – second place	2003 Daegu	Synchronised Platform

Choe Hyong-gil (Korean: 최형길; born 11 September 1976) is a former North Korean diver. He competed in the men's 10 metre platform events at the 1996, 2000 and 2004 Summer Olympics.
