= Massimiliano Mazzucchi =

Italian diver (born 1980)

Personal information
- Nationality: Italian
- Born: 2 October 1980 (age 45) Rome, Lazio, Italy
- Height: 170 cm (5 ft 7 in)
- Weight: 62 kg (137 lb)

Sport
- Sport: Diving
- Partner: Christopher Sacchin
Medal record
Men's diving
Representing Italy
Universiade
Bronze medal – third place	2003 Daegu	3 m springboard synchro

Massimiliano Mazzucchi (born 2 October 1980) is a former Italian diver. Born in Rome, he competed in the men's 10 metre platform events at the 2000 and 2004 Summer Olympics.
