= Christopher Kalec =

Canadian diver (born 1980)

Personal information
- Born: April 7, 1980 (age 44); Montreal, Quebec, Canada
- Height: 165 cm (5 ft 5 in)
- Weight: 70 kg (154 lb)

Sport
- Sport: Diving

Christopher Kalec (born April 7, 1980) is a former Canadian diver. Born in Montreal and raised in Laval, Quebec, he competed in the men's 10 metre platform events at the 2000 and 2004 Summer Olympics.
