= Marina Karpunina =

Russian basketball player

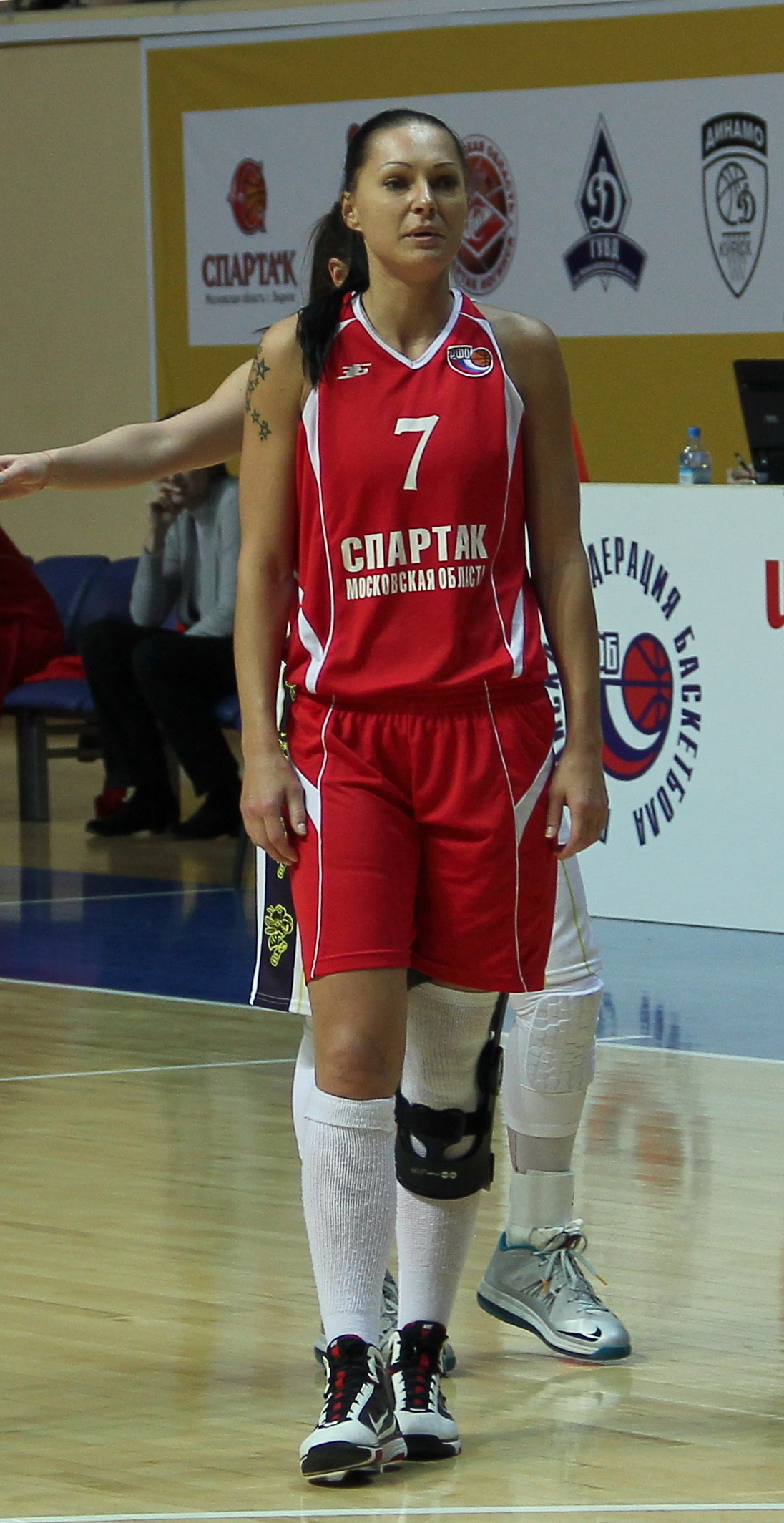
- Karpunina in 2014

Personal information
- Born: 21 March 1984 (age 42) Moscow, Russia
- Height: 178 cm (5 ft 10 in)
- Weight: 73 kg (161 lb)

Sport
- Sport: Basketball
- Club: WBC Spartak Moscow Region (2004–13); Spartak Noginsk (2013–)
Medal record
Representing Russia
Olympic Games
Bronze medal – third place	2008 Beijing	Team
World Championships
Silver medal – second place	2006 Brazil	Team
European Championships
Silver medal – second place	2005 Turkey	Team
Gold medal – first place	2007 Italy	Team
Silver medal – second place	2009 Latvia	Team

Marina Germanovna Karpunina (Russian: Марина Германовна Карпунина, born 21 March 1984) is a Russian basketball player. She was part of the Russian teams that won a bronze medal at the 2008 Olympics, as well as one gold and three silver medals at the world and European championships in 2005–2009. She was the Russian Best Young Player in 2004.
