= Pak Yong-ryong =

North Korean diver

Personal information
- Nationality: North Korean
- Born: 14 December 1980 (age 45)

Sport
- Sport: Diving
Medal record
Men's diving
Representing North Korea
Summer Universiade
Silver medal – second place	2001 Beijing	Synchronized platform
Silver medal – second place	2003 Daegu	Synchronised Platform
Bronze medal – third place	2007 Bangkok	Synchronised Platform

Pak Yong-ryong (born 14 December 1980) is a North Korean diver. He competed at the 2000 Summer Olympics and the 2004 Summer Olympics.
