= Andrey Mamontov =

Belarusian diver

Personal information
- Nationality: Belarusian
- Born: 6 August 1981 (age 44) Voronezh, Russia

Sport
- Sport: Diving
Medal record
Men's diving
Representing Belarus
European Championships
Bronze medal – third place	2002 Berlin	10 m synchro

Andrey Mamontov (born 6 August 1981) is a Belarusian diver. He competed in the men's 10 metre platform event at the 2004 Summer Olympics.
