= Christopher Sacchin =

Italian diver (born 1983)

Personal information
- Full name: Christopher Sacchin
- Nationality: Italian
- Born: 22 April 1983 (age 43) Bolzano, Italy

Sport
- Sport: Diving
- Partner: Massimiliano Mazzucchi
Medal record
Men's diving
Representing Italy
World Championships
Bronze medal – third place	2007 Melbourne	1 m springboard
European Championships
Bronze medal – third place	2006 Budapest	1 m springboard
Bronze medal – third place	2008 Eindhoven	1 m springboard
Universiade
Bronze medal – third place	2003 Daegu	3 m synchro

Christopher Sacchin (born 22 April 1983 in Bolzano) is an Italian diver.

In the 1 metre springboard event he won the bronze medals at the 2007 World Championships and the European Championships in 2006 and 2008.
