= Gleb Galperin =

Russian diver (born 1985)

Personal information
- Full name: Gleb Sergeyevich Galperin
- Born: 25 May 1985 (age 41) Moscow, Russian SFSR, Soviet Union
- Height: 1.75 m (5 ft 9 in)

Sport
- Country: Russia
- Event(s): 10 m, 10 m synchro
- Partner: Dmitriy Dobroskok
Medal record
Men's diving
Representing Russia
Olympic Games
Bronze medal – third place	2008 Beijing	10 m platform
Bronze medal – third place	2008 Beijing	10 m synchro
World Championships
Gold medal – first place	2005 Montreal	10 m synchro
Gold medal – first place	2007 Melbourne	10 m platform
Silver medal – second place	2007 Melbourne	10 m synchro
Bronze medal – third place	2005 Montreal	10 m platform
European Aquatics Championships
Gold medal – first place	2006 Budapest	10 m platform
Gold medal – first place	2006 Budapest	10 m synchro
Bronze medal – third place	2012 Eindhoven	10 m platform
European Diving Championships
Silver medal – second place	2009 Turin	3 m synchro

Gleb Sergeyevich Galperin (Глеб Серге́евич Гальпе́рин; born 25 May 1985, in Moscow) is a Russian diver. Competing in the 2008 Summer Olympics, he won a bronze medal in the men's synchronized 10 metre platform with teammate Dmitry Dobroskok, and also a bronze medal in the individual men's 10 metre platform event. He also competed in the 2004 Summer Olympics and 2012 Summer Olympics.
