= Dmitry Dobroskok =

Russian diver

Dmitriy Dobroskok
Personal information
- Full name: Dmitriy Mikhailovich Dobroskok
- Born: March 1, 1984 (age 42) Buzuluk, Russian SFSR, Soviet Union
- Height: 167 cm (5 ft 6 in)

Sport
- Country: Russia
- Event(s): 10m, 10m synchro
- Partner: Gleb Galperin
Medal record
Men's diving
Representing Russia
Olympic Games
Bronze medal – third place	2008 Beijing	10 m synchro
World Championships
Gold medal – first place	2005 Montreal	10 m synchro
Silver medal – second place	2007 Melbourne	10 m synchro
European Aquatics Championships
Gold medal – first place	2006 Budapest	10 m synchro
European Diving Championships
Silver medal – second place	2009 Turin	10 m platform

Dmitriy Mikhailovich Dobroskok (Russian: Дмитрий Михайлович Доброскок; born March 1, 1984, in Buzuluk) is a Russian diver. Competing in the 2008 Summer Olympics, he won a bronze medal in the men's synchronized 10 metre platform with teammate Gleb Galperin. He also competed in the 2004 Summer Olympics.
