= Azerbaijan at the 1996 Summer Olympics =

- IOC code: AZE
- NOC: National Olympic Committee of the Republic of Azerbaijan
- Website: www.olympic.az (in Azerbaijani and English)

in Atlanta
- Competitors: 23 (20 men, 3 women) in 9 sports
- Flag bearer: Nazim Hüseynov
- Medals Ranked 61st: Gold 0 Silver 1 Bronze 0 Total 1

Summer Olympics appearances (overview)
- 1996; 2000; 2004; 2008; 2012; 2016; 2020; 2024

Other related appearances
- Russian Empire (1900–1912); Soviet Union (1952–1988); Unified Team (1992)

Azerbaijan was represented at the 1996 Summer Olympics in Atlanta, Georgia, United States by the National Olympic Committee of the Republic of Azerbaijan.

It was the first time Azerbaijan had competed at the summer Olympics following independence from the Soviet Union.

In total, 23 athletes including 20 men and three woman represented Azerbaijan in nine different sports including athletics, boxing, diving, fencing, judo, shooting, swimming, weightlifting and wrestling.

Azerbaijan won one medal at the games after Namik Abdullayev claimed silver in the wrestling men's freestyle 52 kg.

== Competitors ==
In total, 23 athletes represented Azerbaijan at the 1996 Summer Olympics in Atlanta, Georgia, United States across nine different sports.

Sport	Men	Women	Total
Athletics	3	1	4
Boxing	2	–	2
Diving	1	0	1
Fencing	1	0	1
Judo	1	1	2
Shooting	1	1	2
Swimming	1	0	1
Weightlifting	2	–	2
Wrestling	8	–	8
Total	20	3	23

== Medalists ==
Azerbaijan won one medal at the games after Namik Abdullayev claimed silver in the wrestling men's freestyle 52 kg.

== Athletics ==
In total, four Azeri athletes participated in the athletics events – Arif Akhundov in the men's 100 m, Vasif Asadov and Aleksey Fatyanov in the men's triple jump and Elvira Cabbarova in the women's 100 m.

Track & road events

Athlete	Event	Heat		Quarterfinal		Semifinal		Final	
Athlete	Event	Result	Rank	Result	Rank	Result	Rank	Result	Rank
Arif Akhundov	Men's 100 m	11.11	7	did not advance					
Elvira Cabbarova	Women's 100 m	11.96	8	did not advance					

Field events

Athlete	Event	Qualification		Final	
Athlete	Event	Distance	Position	Distance	Position
Vasif Asadov	Men's triple jump	16.21	27	did not advance	
Aleksey Fatyanov	Men's triple jump	16.14	31	did not advance	

== Boxing ==
In total, two Azeri athletes participated in the boxing events – Ilkham Kerimov in the light heavyweight category and Adalat Mammadov in the super heavyweight category.

Athlete	Event	Round of 32	Round of 16	Quarterfinals	Semifinals	Final	
Athlete	Event	Opposition Result	Opposition Result	Opposition Result	Opposition Result	Opposition Result	Rank
Ilkham Kerimov	Light heavyweight	Ismael Kone (SWE); L 3–22	did not advance				17
Adalat Mammadov	Super heavyweight	Horáček (CZE); W RSC2	Blocus (FRA); W RSC1	Dokiwari (NGR); L RSC3	did not advance		8

== Diving ==
In total, one Azeri athlete participated in the diving events – Emin Zhabrayilov in the men's 10 m platform.

Athlete	Event	Preliminaries		Semi-finals		Final	
Athlete	Event	Points	Rank	Points	Rank	Points	Rank
Emin Zhabrayilov	10 m platform	294.93	27	did not advance			

== Fencing ==
In total, one Azeri athlete participated in the fencing events – Elxan Məmmədov in the men's individual sabre.

Athlete	Event	Round of 32	Round of 16	Quarterfinal	Semifinal	Final / BM	
Athlete	Event	Opposition Score	Opposition Score	Opposition Score	Opposition Score	Opposition Score	Rank
Elxan Məmmədov	Individual sabre	Kaliuzhniy (UKR); W 5–15	did not advance				40

== Judo ==
In total, two Azeri athletes participated in the judo events – Nazim Huseynov in the men's –60 kg category and Zulfiyya Huseynova in the women's –56 kg category.

== Shooting ==
In total, two Azeri athletes participated in the shooting events – Irada Ashumova in the women's 10 m air pistol and the women's 25 m pistol, Valeri Timokhin in the men's skeet.

== Swimming ==
In total, one Azeri athlete participated in the swimming events – Emin Guliyev in the men's 50 m freestyle.

== Weightlifting ==
In total, two Azeri athletes participated in the weightlifting events – Tofig Heydarov in the –83 kg category and Asif Malikov in the –59 kg category.

== Wrestling ==
In total, eight Azeri athletes participated in the wrestling events – Arif Abdullayev in the men's freestyle –57 kg category, Namig Abdullayev in the men's freestyle –52 kg category, Vilayet Aghayev in the men's Greco-Roman –57 kg category, Elshad Allahverdiyev in the men's freestyle –68 kg category, Magomedsalam Gadzhiev in the men's freestyle –74 kg category, Magomed Ibragimov in the men's freestyle –82 kg category, Davud Magomedov in the men's freestyle –100 kg category and Tahir Zahidov in the men's Greco-Roman –48 kg category.
