= Diving at the 1998 Asian Games =

- Venue: Thammasat Aquatic Center
- Dates: 7–10 December 1998
- Competitors: 38 from 13 nations

Diving was contested from 7 to 10 December at the 1998 Asian Games in Thammasat University Aquatic Center, Bangkok, Thailand.

== Schedule ==
P	Preliminary	S	Semifinal	F	Final

Event↓/Date →	7th Mon	8th Tue	9th Wed		10th Thu
Men's 3 m springboard			P	S	F
Men's 10 m platform	S	F			
Women's 3 m springboard	S	F			
Women's 10 m platform			S		F

== Medalists ==
=== Men ===
Event	Gold	Silver	Bronze
3 m springboard	Zhou Yilin; China	Yu Zhuocheng; China	Suchart Pichi; Thailand
10 m platform	Tian Liang; China	Huang Qiang; China	Suchart Pichi; Thailand

=== Women ===
Event	Gold	Silver	Bronze
3 m springboard	Guo Jingjing; China	Yang Lan; China	Irina Vyguzova; Kazakhstan
10 m platform	Cai Yuyan; China	Li Na; China	Choe Myong-hwa; North Korea

== Medal table ==
Rank	Nation	Gold	Silver	Bronze	Total
1	China (CHN)	4	4	0	8
2	Thailand (THA)	0	0	2	2
3	Kazakhstan (KAZ)	0	0	1	1
3	North Korea (PRK)	0	0	1	1
Totals (4 entries)		4	4	4	12

== Participating nations ==
A total of 38 athletes from 13 nations competed in diving at the 1998 Asian Games:

- China (8)
- Chinese Taipei (3)
- Hong Kong (1)
- Iran (1)
- Japan (3)
- Kazakhstan (4)
- Kuwait (2)
- North Korea (3)
- Qatar (1)
- South Korea (3)
- Sri Lanka (2)
- Tajikistan (1)
- Thailand (6)
