= Diving at the 1996 Summer Olympics – Men's 10 metre platform =

Men's 10 metre platform at the Games of the XXVI Olympiad
- Venue: Georgia Tech Aquatic Center
- Date: 1 August 1996 (qualifying round); 2 August 1996 (semifinal & final)
- Competitors: 37 from 27 nations

Medalists
| 1st place, gold medalist(s) | | Dmitri Sautin | Russia |
| 2nd place, silver medalist(s) | | Jan Hempel | Germany |
| 3rd place, bronze medalist(s) | | Xiao Hailiang | China |

The men's 10 metre platform was one of four diving events included in the Diving at the 1996 Summer Olympics programme.

The competition was split into three phases:

Preliminary round
1 August — Each diver performed a set number of dives without any limitation on the difficulty degree. The 18 divers with the highest total score advanced to the semi-final.
Semi-final
1 August — Each diver performed four dives with limitation on the difficulty degree. The 12 divers with the highest combined score from the semi-final and preliminary dives advanced to the final.
Final
2 August — Each diver performed five dives, without limitation on the difficulty degree. The final ranking was determined by the combined score from the final and semifinal dives.

== Results ==
| Rank | Diver | Nation | Preliminary | | Semi-final | | | | Final | | |
| Rank | Diver | Nation | Points | Rank | Points | Rank | Total | Rank | Points | Rank | Total |
|---|---|---|---|---|---|---|---|---|---|---|---|
| 1st place, gold medalist(s) | Dmitri Sautin | Russia | 452.82 | 1 | 194.64 | 2 | 647.46 | 1 | 497.70 | 1 | 692.34 |
| 2nd place, silver medalist(s) | Jan Hempel | Germany | 394.17 | 7 | 197.22 | 1 | 591.39 | 5 | 466.05 | 3 | 663.27 |
| 3rd place, bronze medalist(s) | Xiao Hailiang | China | 445.86 | 2 | 179.55 | 5 | 625.41 | 2 | 478.65 | 2 | 658.20 |
| 4 | Tian Liang | China | 425.73 | 3 | 185.76 | 3 | 611.49 | 3 | 462.42 | 4 | 648.18 |
| 5 | Vladimir Timoshinin | Russia | 425.43 | 4 | 169.47 | 11 | 594.90 | 4 | 459.12 | 5 | 628.59 |
| 6 | David Pichler | United States | 394.59 | 6 | 175.53 | 8 | 570.12 | 8 | 431.58 | 6 | 607.11 |
| 7 | Fernando Platas | Mexico | 392.31 | 8 | 177.90 | 6 | 570.21 | 7 | 425.13 | 7 | 603.03 |
| 8 | Michael Kühne | Germany | 375.27 | 11 | 169.11 | 12 | 544.38 | 11 | 414.87 | 8 | 583.98 |
| 9 | Patrick Jeffrey | United States | 406.74 | 5 | 174.42 | 9 | 581.16 | 6 | 385.80 | 9 | 560.22 |
| 10 | Ken Terauchi | Japan | 381.51 | 9 | 174.39 | 10 | 555.90 | 10 | 385.50 | 10 | 559.89 |
| 11 | Sergey Kudrevich | Belarus | 375.90 | 10 | 180.63 | 4 | 556.53 | 9 | 347.37 | 12 | 528.00 |
| 12 | Richard Frece | Austria | 373.41 | 12 | 148.35 | 17 | 521.76 | 12 | 355.29 | 11 | 503.64 |
| 13 | Bob Morgan | Great Britain | 343.20 | 17 | 176.64 | 7 | 519.84 | 13 | did not advance | | |
| 14 | Jimmy Sjödin | Sweden | 352.74 | 14 | 165.00 | 13 | 517.74 | 14 | did not advance | | |
| 15 | Choe Hyong-gil | North Korea | 353.40 | 13 | 163.26 | 14 | 516.66 | 15 | did not advance | | |
| 16 | Andrey Kvochinski | Belarus | 349.14 | 15 | 160.50 | 15 | 509.64 | 16 | did not advance | | |
| 17 | Damir Akhmetbekov | Kazakhstan | 346.62 | 16 | 158.58 | 16 | 505.20 | 17 | did not advance | | |
| 18 | Leon Taylor | Great Britain | 341.70 | 18 | 141.87 | 18 | 483.57 | 18 | did not advance | | |
| 19 | Keita Kaneto | Japan | 339.18 | 19 | did not advance | | | | | | |
| 20 | Roman Volod'kov | Ukraine | 335.97 | 20 | did not advance | | | | | | |
| 21 | Samat Muratov | Kazakhstan | 335.43 | 21 | did not advance | | | | | | |
| 22 | Alberto Acosta | Mexico | 322.47 | 22 | did not advance | | | | | | |
| 23 | Daniel Pavón | Spain | 312.78 | 23 | did not advance | | | | | | |
| 24 | Gabriel Chereches | Romania | 309.30 | 24 | did not advance | | | | | | |
| 25 | Dario di Fazio | Venezuela | 307.02 | 25 | did not advance | | | | | | |
| 26 | Oleh Yanchenko | Ukraine | 301.92 | 26 | did not advance | | | | | | |
| 27 | Emil Zhabrayilov | Azerbaijan | 294.93 | 27 | did not advance | | | | | | |
| 28 | Tony Lawson | Australia | 294.75 | 28 | did not advance | | | | | | |
| 29 | Suchat Pichi | Thailand | 290.64 | 29 | did not advance | | | | | | |
| 30 | Tony Iglesias | Bolivia | 290.16 | 30 | did not advance | | | | | | |
| 31 | Kwon Kyung-min | South Korea | 276.27 | 31 | did not advance | | | | | | |
| 32 | Hovhannes Avtandilyan | Armenia | 275.64 | 32 | did not advance | | | | | | |
| 33 | Ng Sui | Hong Kong | 273.30 | 33 | did not advance | | | | | | |
| 34 | Gocha Gakharia | Georgia | 256.68 | 34 | did not advance | | | | | | |
| 35 | Abdul Al-Matrouk | Kuwait | 239.79 | 35 | did not advance | | | | | | |
| 36 | Chuan Hung-ping | Chinese Taipei | 220.89 | 36 | did not advance | | | | | | |
| 37 | Vukan Vuletić | FR Yugoslavia | 187.17 | 37 | did not advance | | | | | | |

== Sources ==
- The Atlanta Committee for the Olympic Games (ACOG) (1997). The Official Report of the Centennial Olympic Games - Volume III: The Competition Results (pdf) (in English and French). Atlanta, GA: Peachtree Publishers. p. 32. ISBN 1-56145-169-X. OCLC 36994823.
