= Diving at the 1998 Asian Games – Women's 3 metre springboard =

Women's 3 metre springboard at the 1998 Asian Games
- Venue: Thammasat Aquatic Center
- Date: 7–8 December 1998
- Competitors: 12 from 8 nations

Medalists
gold medal	Guo Jingjing	China
silver medal	Yang Lan	China
bronze medal	Irina Vyguzova	Kazakhstan

The women's 3 metre springboard diving competition at the 1998 Asian Games in Bangkok was held on 7 and 8 December at Thammasat Aquatic Center.

== Schedule ==
All times are Indochina Time (UTC+07:00)

Date	Time	Event
Monday, 7 December 1998	13:00	Semifinal
Tuesday, 8 December 1998	13:00	Final

== Results ==
Rank	Athlete	SF	Final	Total
1st place, gold medalist(s)	Guo Jingjing (CHN)	230.97	316.50	547.47
2nd place, silver medalist(s)	Yang Lan (CHN)	208.71	302.13	510.84
3rd place, bronze medalist(s)	Irina Vyguzova (KAZ)	201.60	288.39	489.99
4	Ri Ok-rim (PRK)	206.43	243.42	449.85
5	Misako Yamashita (JPN)	190.14	236.58	426.72
6	Chen Ting (TPE)	187.50	222.09	409.59
7	Natalia Shlemova (TJK)	186.36	222.45	408.81
8	Natalya Popova (KAZ)	184.50	219.78	404.28
9	Sukrutai Tommaoros (THA)	190.26	209.04	399.30
10	Jidaporn Srimoung (THA)	178.65	198.06	376.71
11	Tsai Yi-san (TPE)	170.52	182.76	353.28
12	Harini Jayasekera (SRI)	158.16	122.46	280.62
