= Diving at the 1996 Summer Olympics – Women's 3 metre springboard =

Women's 3 metre springboard at the Games of the XXVI Olympiad
- Venue: Georgia Tech Aquatic Center
- Date: 30 July 1996 (qualifying round); 31 July 1996 (semi-final & final)
- Competitors: 30 from 21 nations

Medalists
1st place, gold medalist(s)		Fu Mingxia	China
2nd place, silver medalist(s)		Irina Lashko	Russia
3rd place, bronze medalist(s)		Annie Pelletier	Canada

The women's 3 metre springboard was one of four diving events included in the Diving at the 1996 Summer Olympics programme.

The competition was split into three phases:

Preliminary round
30 July — Each diver performed a set number of dives without any limitation on the difficulty degree. The 18 divers with the highest total score advanced to the semi-final.
Semi-final
30 July — Each diver performed a set number of dives without any limitation on the difficulty degree. The 12 divers with the highest combined score from the semi-final and preliminary dives advanced to the final.
Final
31 July — Each diver performed a set number of dives, without limitation on the difficulty degree. The final ranking was determined by the combined score from the final and semifinal dives.

== Results ==
Rank	Diver	Nation	Preliminary		Semifinal				Final		
Rank	Diver	Nation	Points	Rank	Points	Rank	Total	Rank	Points	Rank	Total
1st place, gold medalist(s)	Fu Mingxia	China	284.28	4	221.49	3	505.77	4	326.19	1	547.68
2nd place, silver medalist(s)	Irina Lashko	Russia	271.92	8	234.51	1	506.43	3	277.68	6	512.19
3rd place, bronze medalist(s)	Annie Pelletier	Canada	236.58	17	218.76	5	455.34	12	290.88	5	509.64
4	Melisa Moses	United States	279.75	6	211.95	6	491.70	6	296.04	3	507.99
5	Olena Zhupina	Ukraine	286.47	3	209.55	10	496.02	5	297.72	2	507.27
6	Yuki Motobuchi	Japan	262.71	11	210.00	9	472.71	11	296.04	3	506.04
7	Vera Ilina	Russia	308.88	1	230.19	2	539.07	1	263.37	10	493.56
8	Anna Lindberg	Sweden	292.02	2	220.29	4	512.31	2	269.52	9	489.81
9	Jenny Keim	United States	270.48	9	211.17	8	481.65	7	275.46	7	486.63
10	Irina Vyguzova	Kazakhstan	276.45	7	202.86	13	479.31	10	273.06	8	475.92
11	Claudia Bockner	Germany	281.31	5	200.19	15	481.50	8	255.51	11	455.70
12	Iryna Pissareva	Ukraine	269.43	10	211.23	7	480.66	9	236.79	12	448.02
13	María Alcalá	Mexico	257.01	12	193.62	16	450.63	13	did not advance		
14	Svetlana Alekseyeva	Belarus	246.27	14	200.37	14	446.64	14	did not advance		
15	Jodie Rogers	Australia	242.19	15	204.18	12	446.37	15	did not advance		
16	Simona Koch	Germany	239.91	16	204.99	11	444.90	16	did not advance		
17	Maria Elena Romero	Mexico	252.84	13	187.35	17	440.19	17	did not advance		
18	Yelena Ivanova	Kazakhstan	235.50	18	187.20	18	422.70	18	did not advance		
19	Loudy Tourky	Australia	229.11	19	did not advance						
20	Arus Gyulbudaghyan	Armenia	228.72	20	did not advance						
21	Eryn Bulmer	Canada	226.74	21	did not advance						
22	Ri Ok-rim	North Korea	219.63	22	did not advance						
23	Tan Shuping	China	212.49	23	did not advance						
24	Francesca D'Oriano	Italy	208.77	24	did not advance						
25	Orsolya Pintér	Hungary	206.52	25	did not advance						
26	Julia Cruz	Spain	205.32	26	did not advance						
27	Vivián Alberty	Puerto Rico	195.18	27	did not advance						
28	Nino Qazarashvili	Georgia	191.49	28	did not advance						
29	Nataliya Shlemova	Tajikistan	180.54	29	did not advance						
30	Daphne Hernández	Costa Rica	151.11	30	did not advance						

== Sources ==
- The Atlanta Committee for the Olympic Games (ACOG) (1997). The Official Report of the Centennial Olympic Games - Volume III: The Competition Results (pdf) (in English and French). Atlanta, GA: Peachtree Publishers. p. 31. ISBN 1-56145-169-X. OCLC 36994823.
