= Wushu at the 1997 East Asian Games =

- Dates: May 16-18, 1997
- Nations: 8

Wushu was contested by both men and women at the 1997 East Asian Games. China dominated the medals table, winning gold in four of the six events contested.

Ng Siu Ching's gold medal in women's nanquan was the last time British Hong Kong won a gold medal in international sports competition.

== Medal table ==
Rank	Nation	Gold	Silver	Bronze	Total
1	China (CHN)	4	1	1	6
2	Hong Kong (HKG)	1	1	1	3
3	Chinese Taipei (TPE)	1	1	0	2
4	Japan (JPN)	0	2	2	4
5	South Korea (KOR)	0	1	1	2
6	Macau (MAC)	0	0	1	1
Totals (6 entries)		6	6	6	18

== Medalists ==
=== Men ===
Event	Gold	Silver	Bronze
Changquan; 3-event all-around	Li Yonghu; China	Park Chan-dae; South Korea	Ng Wa Loi; Macau
Nanquan	Huang Shaoxiong; China	Lee Chun-hui; Chinese Taipei	Leung Yat Ho; Hong Kong
Taijiquan	Chan Ming-shu; Chinese Taipei	Toshiya Watanabe; Japan	Shao Yingjian; China

=== Women ===
Event	Gold	Silver	Bronze
Changquan; 3-event all-around	Chen Jing; China	Lo Nga Ching; Hong Kong	Yuri Kaminiwa; Japan
Nanquan	Ng Siu Ching; Hong Kong	Wang Kuankuan; China	Akiko Nobuhiro; Japan
Taijiquan	Liang Xiaokui; China	Yomi Akatsu; Japan	Boo Eun-kyung; South Korea
