= Diving at the 1998 Asian Games – Men's 3 metre springboard =

Men's 3 metre springboard at the 1998 Asian Games
- Venue: Thammasat Aquatic Center
- Date: 9–10 December 1998
- Competitors: 16 from 11 nations

Medalists
gold medal	Zhou Yilin	China
silver medal	Yu Zhuocheng	China
bronze medal	Suchart Pichi	Thailand

The men's 3 metre springboard diving competition at the 1998 Asian Games in Bangkok was held on 9 and 10 December at Thammasat Aquatic Center.

== Schedule ==
All times are Indochina Time (UTC+07:00)

Date	Time	Event
Wednesday, 9 December 1998	13:00	Preliminary
Wednesday, 9 December 1998	13:00	Semifinal
Thursday, 10 December 1998	13:00	Final

== Results ==
=== Preliminary ===
Rank	Athlete	Score
1	Zhou Yilin (CHN)	700.14
2	Yu Zhuocheng (CHN)	677.85
3	Suchart Pichi (THA)	636.24
4	Ken Terauchi (JPN)	582.69
5	Kwon Kyung-min (KOR)	537.99
6	Kiichiro Miyamoto (JPN)	534.39
7	Anupan Atthainsee (THA)	503.58
8	Ng Sui (HKG)	472.05
9	Alexey Gurman (KAZ)	461.01
10	Fan Ching-yao (TPE)	455.16
11	Faisal Al-Baghli (KUW)	410.07
12	Mubarak Al-Nuaimi (QAT)	379.08
13	Mahboob Mahmoud (KUW)	371.16
14	Mohammad Reza Hedayati (IRI)	327.15
15	Charith Ranatunga (SRI)	324.84
16	Cho Dae-don (KOR)	53.76

=== Final ===
Rank	Athlete	Score
1st place, gold medalist(s)	Zhou Yilin (CHN)	712.02
2nd place, silver medalist(s)	Yu Zhuocheng (CHN)	708.12
3rd place, bronze medalist(s)	Suchart Pichi (THA)	654.75
4	Ken Terauchi (JPN)	615.78
5	Kwon Kyung-min (KOR)	559.38
6	Anupan Atthainsee (THA)	536.13
7	Kiichiro Miyamoto (JPN)	536.10
8	Ng Sui (HKG)	507.09
9	Alexey Gurman (KAZ)	482.73
10	Mubarak Al-Nuaimi (QAT)	456.09
11	Fan Ching-yao (TPE)	443.10
12	Faisal Al-Baghli (KUW)	423.30
