= Diving at the 1998 Asian Games – Men's 10 metre platform =

Men's 10 metre platform at the 1998 Asian Games
- Venue: Thammasat Aquatic Center
- Date: 7–8 December 1998
- Competitors: 12 from 7 nations

Medalists
gold medal	Tian Liang	China
silver medal	Huang Qiang	China
bronze medal	Suchart Pichi	Thailand

The men's 10 metre platform diving competition at the 1998 Asian Games in Bangkok was held on 7 and 8 December at Thammasat Aquatic Center.

== Schedule ==
All times are Indochina Time (UTC+07:00)

Date	Time	Event
Monday, 7 December 1998	13:00	Semifinal
Tuesday, 8 December 1998	13:00	Final

== Results ==
Rank	Athlete	SF	Final	Total
1st place, gold medalist(s)	Tian Liang (CHN)	180.42	477.24	657.66
2nd place, silver medalist(s)	Huang Qiang (CHN)	176.76	397.26	574.02
3rd place, bronze medalist(s)	Suchart Pichi (THA)	163.86	396.03	559.89
4	Kwon Kyung-min (KOR)	155.46	398.88	554.34
5	Ken Terauchi (JPN)	173.97	373.11	547.08
6	Kiichiro Miyamoto (JPN)	157.89	370.59	528.48
7	Choe Hyong-gil (PRK)	152.67	344.97	497.64
8	Damir Akhmetbekov (KAZ)	159.54	309.75	469.29
9	Cho Dae-don (KOR)	161.01	303.21	464.22
10	Alexey Gurman (KAZ)	148.50	287.10	435.60
11	Meerit Insawang (THA)	142.20	259.05	401.25
12	Mohammad Reza Hedayati (IRI)	139.62	166.71	306.33
