= Diving at the 2000 Summer Olympics – Women's 3 metre springboard =

Women's 3 metre springboard at the Games of the XXVII Olympiad

Medalists
1st place, gold medalist(s)		Fu Mingxia	China
2nd place, silver medalist(s)		Guo Jingjing	China
3rd place, bronze medalist(s)		Dörte Lindner	Germany

The women's 3 metre springboard was one of eight diving events included in the Diving at the 2000 Summer Olympics programme.

The competition was split into three phases:

Preliminary round
27 September — Each diver performed a front dive, a back dive, a reverse dive, an inward dive and a twisting dive. There were no limitations in degree of difficulty. The 18 divers with the highest total score advanced to the semi-final.
Semi-final
27 September — Each diver performed a front dive, a back dive, a reverse dive, an inward dive and a twisting dive. The overall difficulty degree was limited to 9.5. The 12 divers with the highest combined score from the semi-final and preliminary dives advanced to the final.
Final
28 September — Each diver performed a front dive, a back dive, a reverse dive, an inward dive and a twisting dive. There were no limitations in difficulty degree. The final ranking was determined by the combined score from the final and semi-final dives.

== Results ==
Rank	Diver	Nation	Preliminary		Semifinal				Final		
Rank	Diver	Nation	Points	Rank	Points	Rank	Total	Rank	Points	Rank	Total
1st place, gold medalist(s)	Fu Mingxia	China	342.75	1	242.82	2	585.57	1	366.60	1	609.42
2nd place, silver medalist(s)	Guo Jingjing	China	332.67	2	251.22	1	583.89	2	346.59	2	597.81
3rd place, bronze medalist(s)	Dörte Lindner	Germany	309.21	4	233.82	5	543.03	5	340.53	3	574.35
4	Ioulia Pakhalina	Russia	316.08	3	236.43	4	552.51	3	333.99	4	570.42
5	Anna Lindberg	Sweden	275.34	11	233.34	6	508.68	9	325.83	5	559.17
6	Vera Ilina	Russia	305.25	5	237.81	3	543.06	4	317.34	7	555.15
7	Chantelle Michell	Australia	270.75	13	228.84	7	499.59	12	321.84	6	550.68
8	Jenny Keim	United States	285.12	9	225.90	8	511.02	8	308.28	9	534.18
9	Irina Vyguzova	Kazakhstan	303.30	6	217.47	11	520.77	6	310.86	8	528.33
10	Blythe Hartley	Canada	295.98	7	219.00	10	514.98	7	304.05	10	523.05
11	Ganna Sorokina	Ukraine	291.39	8	210.63	16	502.02	10	302.34	11	512.97
12	Michelle Davison	United States	280.26	10	219.48	9	499.74	11	291.00	12	510.48
13	Azul Almazán	Mexico	272.85	12	216.03	13	488.88	13	did not advance		
14	Olha Yefimenko	Ukraine	265.74	16	215.25	15	480.99	14	did not advance		
15	Svetlana Alekseyeva	Belarus	260.91	17	216.48	12	477.39	15	did not advance		
16	Jane Smith	Great Britain	269.22	14	207.90	17	477.12	16	did not advance		
17	Rebecca Gilmore	Australia	259.74	18	215.55	14	475.29	17	did not advance		
18	Tania Cagnotto	Italy	259.74	18	206.55	18	466.29	18	did not advance		
19	Jashia Luna	Mexico	268.44	15	196.53	19	464.97	19	did not advance		
20	Eryn Bulmer	Canada	258.93	20	did not advance						
21	Sotiria Koutsopetrou	Greece	258.81	21	did not advance						
22	Nóra Barta	Hungary	258.33	22	did not advance						
23	Sandra Ponthus	France	242.79	23	did not advance						
24	Iohana Cruz	Cuba	239.97	24	did not advance						
25	Orsolya Pintér	Hungary	239.64	25	did not advance						
26	Ri Ok-rim	North Korea	238.77	26	did not advance						
27	Angelique Rodríguez	Puerto Rico	235.47	27	did not advance						
28	Nataliya Popova	Kazakhstan	234.90	28	did not advance						
29	Chen Ting	Chinese Taipei	229.77	29	did not advance						
30	Maria Marconi	Italy	229.11	30	did not advance						
31	Karen Smith	Great Britain	224.58	31	did not advance						
32	Sheila Mae Pérez	Philippines	223.65	32	did not advance						
33	Choe Song-hui	North Korea	222.84	33	did not advance						
34	Diana Pineda	Colombia	220.68	34	did not advance						
35	Juliana Veloso	Brazil	220.62	35	did not advance						
36	Julie Danaux	France	219.87	36	did not advance						
37	Alejandra Fuentes	Venezuela	219.81	37	did not advance						
38	Catherine Maliev-Aviolat	Switzerland	204.06	38	did not advance						
39	Leong Mun Yee	Malaysia	186.51	39	did not advance						
40	Svetlana Ishkova	Argentina	185.61	40	did not advance						
41	Tsai Yi-san	Chinese Taipei	181.92	41	did not advance						
42	Eka Purnama Indah	Indonesia	178.83	42	did not advance						
43	Conny Schmalfuss	Germany	89.46	43	did not advance						

== Sources ==
- Sydney Organising Committee for the Olympic Games (SOCOG) (2001). Official Report of the XXVII Olympiad - Volume Three: Results (Diving) (pdf) (in English and French). Sydney, New South Wales: Sydney Organising Committee for the Olympic Games (SOCOG). pp. 62–73. ISBN 0-9579616-1-8. OCLC 49687523.
