= Diving at the 2000 Summer Olympics – Men's 10 metre platform =

Men's 10 metre platform at the Games of the XXVII Olympiad

Medalists
1st place, gold medalist(s)		Tian Liang	China
2nd place, silver medalist(s)		Hu Jia	China
3rd place, bronze medalist(s)		Dmitri Sautin	Russia

The men's 10 metre platform was one of eight diving events included in the Diving at the 2000 Summer Olympics programme.

The competition was split into three phases:

Preliminary round
29 September — Each diver performed a front dive, a back dive, a reverse dive, an inward dive, a twisting dive and an armstand dive. There were no limitations in degree of difficulty. The 18 divers with the highest total score advanced to the semi-final.
Semi-final
29 September — Each diver performed four dives out of a group consisting of a front dive, a back dive, a reverse dive, an inward dive, a twisting dive and an armstand dive. The 12 divers with the highest combined score from the semi-final and preliminary dives advanced to the final.
Final
30 September — Each diver performed a front dive, a back dive, a reverse dive, an inward dive, a twisting dive and an armstand dive, all limited in difficulty degree. The final ranking was determined by the combined score from the final and semi-final dives.

== Results ==
Rank	Diver	Country	Preliminary		Semifinal				Final		
Rank	Diver	Country	Points	Rank	Points	Rank	Total	Rank	Points	Rank	Total
1st place, gold medalist(s)	Tian Liang	China	503.16	1	201.45	2	704.61	1	523.08	1	724.53
2nd place, silver medalist(s)	Hu Jia	China	485.43	2	206.61	1	692.04	2	506.94	2	713.55
3rd place, bronze medalist(s)	Dmitri Sautin	Russia	471.27	3	190.92	5	662.19	3	488.34	3	679.26
4	Alexandre Despatie	Canada	436.86	8	188.28	6	625.14	8	464.07	4	652.35
5	Ken Terauchi	Japan	457.59	4	191.49	4	649.08	5	445.41	5	636.90
6	Mark Ruiz	United States	432.36	10	180.99	14	613.35	10	444.93	6	625.92
7	Igor Lukashin	Russia	432.15	11	179.94	15	612.09	11	444.57	7	624.51
8	Mathew Helm	Australia	455.37	5	198.03	3	653.40	4	420.21	11	618.24
9	David Pichler	United States	440.91	7	187.89	7	628.80	7	428.28	9	616.17
10	Robert Newbery	Australia	437.40	9	185.28	10	619.98	9	428.70	8	613.98
11	Heiko Meyer	Germany	411.36	12	179.34	16	590.70	12	420.66	10	600.00
12	Choe Hyong-gil	North Korea	448.41	6	185.52	9	633.93	6	377.46	12	562.98
13	Leon Taylor	Great Britain	399.90	16	185.91	8	585.81	13	did not advance		
14	José Guerra	Cuba	403.14	13	181.65	13	584.79	14	did not advance		
15	Jan Hempel	Germany	401.19	14	181.71	12	582.90	15	did not advance		
16	Pak Yong-ryong	North Korea	400.29	15	181.74	11	582.03	16	did not advance		
17	Christopher Kalec	Canada	388.50	17	175.02	17	563.52	17	did not advance		
18	Massimiliano Mazzucchi	Italy	386.91	18	172.80	18	559.71	18	did not advance		
19	Francisco Pérez	Mexico	381.78	19	did not advance						
20	Gilles Emptoz-Lacôte	France	377.70	20	did not advance						
21	Roman Volod'kov	Ukraine	377.04	21	did not advance						
22	Jesus Iory	Cuba	368.34	22	did not advance						
23	Oleksandr Skrypnyk	Ukraine	362.82	23	did not advance						
24	Yeoh Ken Nee	Malaysia	361.86	24	did not advance						
25	Mohamed Azreen Bahari	Malaysia	342.24	25	did not advance						
26	Emil Zhabrayilov	Azerbaijan	334.74	26	did not advance						
27	Juan Urán	Colombia	333.93	27	did not advance						
28	Cassius Duran	Brazil	331.86	28	did not advance						
29	Yu Chang-jun	South Korea	331.05	29	did not advance						
30	Gabriel Chereches	Romania	320.61	30	did not advance						
31	Aleksey Gurman	Kazakhstan	320.13	31	did not advance						
32	Jo Dae-don	South Korea	319.53	32	did not advance						
33	Peter Waterfield	Great Britain	317.31	33	did not advance						
34	András Hajnal	Hungary	316.14	34	did not advance						
35	Luis Villarroel	Venezuela	309.66	35	did not advance						
36	Rubén Santos	Spain	300.90	36	did not advance						
37	Abel Sánchez	Peru	295.14	37	did not advance						
38	Hovhannes Avtandilyan	Armenia	284.91	38	did not advance						
39	Suchat Pichi	Thailand	268.65	39	did not advance						
40	Mohamed Nasrullah	Indonesia	257.22	40	did not advance						
41	Damir Akhmetbekov	Kazakhstan	75.42	41	did not advance						
42	Eduardo Rueda	Mexico	60.30	42	did not advance						

== Sources ==
- Sydney Organising Committee for the Olympic Games (SOCOG) (2001). Official Report of the XXVII Olympiad - Volume Three: Results (Diving) (pdf) (in English and French). Sydney, New South Wales: Sydney Organising Committee for the Olympic Games (SOCOG). pp. 41–53. ISBN 0-9579616-1-8. OCLC 49687523.
