= Badminton at the 1997 East Asian Games =

Badminton tournament

1997 East Asian Games
Tournament details
- Dates: 10 – 19 May
- Edition: 2nd
- Venue: Pukyong National University Gymnasium
- Location: Busan, South Korea

Badminton at the 1997 East Asian Games was held at Busan, South Korea in the month of May. Competitions for five individual disciplines as well as for teams was conducted. Host South Korea topped with four gold medals, while China won two gold medals and Chinese Taipei's only gold medal was in the men's singles discipline.

== Medal summary ==
=== Medal table ===
* Host nation (South Korea)

Rank	Nation	Gold	Silver	Bronze	Total
1	South Korea (KOR)	4	2	2	8
2	China (CHN)	2	3	5	10
3	Chinese Taipei (TPE)	1	0	3	4
4	Japan (JPN)	0	2	4	6
Totals (4 entries)		7	7	14	28

=== Medalists ===
Discipline	Gold	Silver	Bronze
Men's singles	(Chinese Taipei) Fung Permadi	(Japan) Fumihiko Machida	(China) Chen Wei
Men's singles	(Chinese Taipei) Fung Permadi	(Japan) Fumihiko Machida	(South Korea) Jang Chun-woong
Women's singles	(South Korea) Lee Joo-hyun	(Japan) Takako Ida	(China) Sun Jian
Women's singles	(South Korea) Lee Joo-hyun	(Japan) Takako Ida	(China) Zeng Yaqiong
Men's doubles	(South Korea) Lee Dong-soo (South Korea) Yoo Yong-sung	(South Korea) Choi Ji-tae (South Korea) Kim Joong-suk	(China) Que Ning (China) Liang Yongping
Men's doubles	(South Korea) Lee Dong-soo (South Korea) Yoo Yong-sung	(South Korea) Choi Ji-tae (South Korea) Kim Joong-suk	(Japan) Takuya Katayama (Japan) Yuzo Kubota
Women's doubles	(China) Zhang Jin (China) Peng Xinyong	(China) Wang Li (China) Liu Lufang	(Chinese Taipei) Peng Ju-yu (Chinese Taipei) Chen Mei-chun
Women's doubles	(China) Zhang Jin (China) Peng Xinyong	(China) Wang Li (China) Liu Lufang	(Japan) Chikako Nakayama (Japan) Takae Masumo
Mixed doubles	(South Korea) Lee Dong-soo (South Korea) Yim Kyung-jin	(China) Yang Ming (China) Zhang Jin	(China) Hu Zhilan (China) Peng Xinyong
Mixed doubles	(South Korea) Lee Dong-soo (South Korea) Yim Kyung-jin	(China) Yang Ming (China) Zhang Jin	(South Korea) Yoo Yong-sung (South Korea) Lee Kyung-won
Men's team	South Korea; Hwang Sun-ho; Jang Chun-wong; Lee Dong-soo; Choi Ji-tae; Kim Joong-suk; Kim Hyung-joon; Yoo Yong-sung	China; Hu Zhilan; Xiao Ting; Que Ning; Yang Ming; Liang Yongping; Xia Xuanze; Chen Wei	Chinese Taipei; Chen Feng; Jang Chun-wung; Huang Shih-chung
Men's team	South Korea; Hwang Sun-ho; Jang Chun-wong; Lee Dong-soo; Choi Ji-tae; Kim Joong-suk; Kim Hyung-joon; Yoo Yong-sung	China; Hu Zhilan; Xiao Ting; Que Ning; Yang Ming; Liang Yongping; Xia Xuanze; Chen Wei	Japan; Fumihiko Machida; Yuzo Kubota; Takuya Katayama
Women's team	China; Yao Jie; Liu Lufang; Wang Li; Zhang Jin; Peng Xinyong; Sun Jian; Zeng Yaqiong	South Korea; Lee Joo-hyun; Lee Deuk-soon; Park Se-yeon; Lee So-young; Cha Yun-sook; Yim Kyung-jin; Park Jin-hyun; Lee Kyung-won	Chinese Taipei; Peng Ju-yu; Chen Mei-chun
Women's team	China; Yao Jie; Liu Lufang; Wang Li; Zhang Jin; Peng Xinyong; Sun Jian; Zeng Yaqiong	South Korea; Lee Joo-hyun; Lee Deuk-soon; Park Se-yeon; Lee So-young; Cha Yun-sook; Yim Kyung-jin; Park Jin-hyun; Lee Kyung-won	Japan; Chikako Nakayama; Takae Masumo; Takako Ida

== Final results ==
Category	Winners	Runners-up	Score
Men's singles	(Chinese Taipei) Fung Permadi	(Japan) Fumihiko Machida	18–13, 15–5
Women's singles	(South Korea) Lee Joo-hyun	(Japan) Takako Ida	11–8, 11–5
Men's doubles	(South Korea) Lee Dong-soo (South Korea) Yoo Yong-sung	(South Korea) Choi Ji-tae (South Korea) Kim Joong-suk	15–2, 15–4
Women's doubles	(China) Zhang Jin (China) Peng Xinyong	(China) Wang Li (China) Liu Lufang	15–8, 15–6
Mixed doubles	(South Korea) Lee Dong-soo (South Korea) Yim Kyung-jin	(China) Yang Ming (China) Zhang Jin	15–11, 15–6
