= Takako Ida =

Japanese badminton player

Personal information
- Born: 13 December 1972 (age 53) Saitama Prefecture, Japan
- Height: 1.60 m (5 ft 3 in)
- Weight: 57 kg (126 lb)

Sport
- Country: Japan
- Sport: Badminton
- Handedness: Right
- Event: Women's singles & doubles

Women's singles & doubles
- BWF profile
Medal record
Women's badminton
Representing Japan
Asian Games
Bronze medal – third place	1998 Bangkok	Women's team
Bronze medal – third place	1994 Hiroshima	Women's team
East Asian Games
Silver medal – second place	1997 Busan	Women's singles
Bronze medal – third place	1997 Busan	Women's team

Takako Ida (井田 貴子, Ida Takako; born 13 December 1972) is a former Japanese badminton player. Born in Saitama Prefecture, Ida graduated from Saitama High School.

== Career ==
She was part of the national women's team that competed at the 1994 and 1998 Asian Games, winning the bronze medals in both events, and also participated at the 1994, 1996 and 1998 Uber Cups. She won the women's singles title at the National Championships tournament in 1996 and 1997. Ida also competed at the 1997 East Asian Games in Busan, South Korea, clinched the women's singles silver and the women's team bronze medals. Ida who was affiliated with Sanyo Electric, took part at the Sydney 2000 Olympics in the women's singles event.

== Achievements ==
=== East Asian Games ===
Women's singles
Year	Venue	Opponent	Score	Result
1997	Busan, South Korea	(South Korea) Lee Joo-hyun	8–11, 5–11	Silver

=== IBF World Grand Prix ===
The World Badminton Grand Prix sanctioned by International Badminton Federation (IBF) since 1983.

Women's singles
Year	Tournament	Opponent	Score	Result	Ref.
2000	Polish Open	(Ukraine) Elena Nozdran	11–8, 11–3	(gold) Winner	

=== IBF International ===
Women's singles
Year	Tournament	Opponent	Score	Result	Ref.
1999	Spanish International	(France) Sandra Dimbour	11–2, 11–0	(gold) Winner	
1999	Scottish International	(China) Zeng Yaqiong	11–8, 11–1	(gold) Winner	
2000	Canadian International	(Germany) Katja Michalowsky	11–6, 13–10	(gold) Winner	
2000	Cuba International	(Finland) Anu Weckström	11–2, 11–6	(gold) Winner	
2000	French International	(China) Xu Li	11–7, 11–8	(gold) Winner	
2000	Peru International	(Republic of Ireland) Sonya McGinn	11–3, 11–3	(gold) Winner	
2000	Chile International	(Republic of Ireland) Sonya McGinn	11–6, 11–7	(gold) Winner	
