= Zeng Yaqiong =

Chinese badminton player

Zeng Yaqiong 曾雅琼
Personal information
- Born: 8 January 1976 (age 50) Xiamen, Fujian, China
- Height: 1.72 m (5 ft 8 in)

Sport
- Country: China
- Sport: Badminton
- Handedness: Right
- Event: Women's singles & doubles

Women's singles & doubles
- BWF profile
Medal record
Women's badminton
Representing China
Asian Cup
Silver medal – second place	1996 Seoul	Women's singles
East Asian Games
Gold medal – first place	1997 Busan	Women's team
Bronze medal – third place	1997 Busan	Women's singles
World Junior Championships
Silver medal – second place	1994 Kuala Lumpur	Girls' singles

Zeng Yaqiong (Chinese: 曾雅琼; pinyin: Zēng Yǎqióng; born 8 January 1976) is a Chinese retired badminton player. She was the girls' singles silver medalist at the 1994 World Junior Championships. Zeng competed at the 1997 East Asian Games in South Korea, helping the team clinch the gold medal, and won a bronze medal in the women's singles event. She left the national team at the end of 1999, and went to the United Kingdom to studying English for a year. In UK, she trained in Milton Keynes, and still competing in the international tournaments.

== Achievements ==
=== Asian Cup ===
Women's singles
Year	Venue	Opponent	Score	Result
1996	Olympic Gymnasium No. 2 Seoul, South Korea	(China) Zhang Ning	11–5, 2–11, 4–11	Silver

=== East Asian Games ===
Women's singles
Year	Venue	Opponent	Score	Result
1997	Pukyong National University Gymnasium; Busan, South Korea			Bronze

=== World Junior Championships ===
Girls' singles
Year	Venue	Opponent	Score	Result
1994	Kuala Lumpur Badminton Stadium; Kuala Lumpur, Malaysia	(China) Wang Chen	11–3, 5–11, 4–11	Silver

=== IBF World Grand Prix ===
The World Badminton Grand Prix sanctioned by International Badminton Federation (IBF) from 1983 to 2006.

Women's singles
Year	Tournament	Opponent	Score	Result
1995	Brunei Open	(China) Yao Jie	5–11, 10–12	(silver) Runner-up
1996	Vietnam Open	(China) Sun Jian	11–5, 12–9	(gold) Winner
1997	Thailand Open	(China) Wang Chen	3–11, 6–11	(silver) Runner-up
2002	Swiss Open	(Netherlands) Mia Audina	1–7, 3–7, 2–7	(silver) Runner-up

Women's doubles
Year	Tournament	Partner	Opponent	Score	Result
1996	Vietnam Open	(China) Sun Jian	(China) Peng Xinyong (China) Zhang Jin	9–15, 15–12, 8–15	(silver) Runner-up

=== IBF International ===
Women's singles
Year	Tournament	Opponent	Score	Result
1999	Scottish International	(Japan) Takako Ida	8–11, 1–11	(silver) Runner-up
1999	Italian International	(China) Han Jingna	Walkover	(gold) Winner
1999	BMW Open	(Netherlands) Judith Meulendijks	11–13, 13–12, 11–1	(gold) Winner
2002	Le Volant d'Or de Toulouse	(Denmark) Tine Høy	11–2, 11–3	(gold) Winner

Mixed doubles
Year	Tournament	Partner	Opponent	Score	Result
1999	Italian International	(England) Anthony Clark	(England) Ian Sullivan (China) Han Jingna	11–15, 7–15	(silver) Runner-up
