= Wushu at the 2001 East Asian Games =

- Dates: May 25-27, 2001

Wushu was contested by both men and women at the 2001 East Asian Games in taolu and sanshou disciplines from May 25-27, 2001.

== Medal table ==
Taolu only

Rank	Nation	Gold	Silver	Bronze	Total
1	China (CHN)	4	0	0	4
2	Hong Kong (HKG)	1	1	1	3
3	Macau (MAC)	1	0	2	3
4	Japan (JPN)	0	2	1	3
5	South Korea (KOR)	0	2	0	2
6	Chinese Taipei (TPE)	0	1	2	3
Totals (6 entries)		6	6	6	18

== Medalists ==
=== Men ===
Event	Gold	Silver	Bronze
Changquan; 3-event all-around	Yuan Xindong; China	Park Chan-dae; South Korea	Ng Wa Loi; Macau
Nanquan	Chen Shuai; China	Kim Young-jea; South Korea	Liu Chun-wei; Chinese Taipei
Taijiquan	Zou Yunjian; China	Chan Ming-shu; Chinese Taipei	Toshiya Watanabe; Japan

=== Women ===
Event	Gold	Silver	Bronze
Changquan; 3-event all-around	Han Jing; Macau	Lo Nga Ching; Hong Kong	Chong Sao Lan; Macau
Nanquan	Huang Chunni; China	Sachiko Takeda; Japan	Angie Tsang; Hong Kong
Taijiquan	Li Fai; Hong Kong	Emi Akazawa; Japan	Hsieh Chen-yi; Chinese Taipei
