= Akhundov =

Akhundov is a surname. Notable people with the surname include:

- Mirza Fatali Akhundov, writer
- Rashadat Akhundov, activist
- Suleyman Sani Akhundov, journalist, author and teacher
- Vali Akhundov, politician and scientist
- Ruhulla Akhundov, politician
- Arif Akhundov, sprinter

== Other ==
- Punik, Armenia - formerly named Akhundov
