= Wushu at the East Asian Games =

Wushu was contested at the East Asian Games from 1993 to the last edition in 2013.

== Editions ==
Games	Year	Host city	Best Nation
I	1993	(China) Shanghai	China
II	1997	(South Korea) Busan	China
III	2001	(Japan) Osaka	China
IV	2005	Macau	China
V	2009	Hong Kong	China
VI	2013	(China) Tianjin	China

== Medal table ==
Excluding 2001, 2005, and 2013 sanda.

Rank	Nation	Gold	Silver	Bronze	Total
1	China (CHN)	37	4	4	45
2	Hong Kong (HKG)	9	10	15	34
3	Macau (MAC)	8	12	16	36
4	Japan (JPN)	2	11	10	23
5	Chinese Taipei (TPE)	2	9	12	23
6	South Korea (KOR)	1	13	4	18
7	Mongolia (MGL)	0	2	4	6
Totals (7 entries)		59	61	65	185
