= Yanchenko =

Yanchenko (Ukrainian: Янченко) or Yanchanka/Jančanka (Belarusian: Янчанка) is a surname. Notable people with the surname include:

- Aleksandr Yanchenko (born 1995), Belarusian footballer
- Halyna Yanchenko (born 1988), Ukrainian politician
- Oleh Yanchenko (born 1979), Ukrainian diver
- Vasili Yanchenko (1894–1959), Russian flying ace
