= Diving at the 1998 Asian Games – Women's 10 metre platform =

Women's 10 metre platform at the 1998 Asian Games
- Venue: Thammasat Aquatic Center
- Date: 9–10 December 1998
- Competitors: 9 from 6 nations

Medalists
gold medal	Cai Yuyan	China
silver medal	Li Na	China
bronze medal	Choe Myong-hwa	North Korea

The women's 10 metre platform diving competition at the 1998 Asian Games in Bangkok was held on 9 and 10 December at Thammasat Aquatic Center.

== Schedule ==
All times are Indochina Time (UTC+07:00)

Date	Time	Event
Wednesday, 9 December 1998	13:00	Semifinal
Thursday, 10 December 1998	13:00	Final

== Results ==
Rank	Athlete	SF	Final	Total
1st place, gold medalist(s)	Cai Yuyan (CHN)	188.61	360.96	549.57
2nd place, silver medalist(s)	Li Na (CHN)	187.92	359.88	547.80
3rd place, bronze medalist(s)	Choe Myong-hwa (PRK)	174.15	325.20	499.35
4	Ri Ok-rim (PRK)	170.76	281.07	451.83
5	Sukrutai Tommaoros (THA)	162.00	253.98	415.98
6	Lee Mee-sun (KOR)	166.26	241.35	407.61
7	Natalya Popova (KAZ)	163.26	211.92	375.18
8	Misako Yamashita (JPN)	150.69	224.19	374.88
9	Sureerat Atthainsee (THA)	119.07	211.35	330.42
