= Courtney Johnson =

Courtney Johnson may refer to:

- Courtney Johnson (musician) (1939–1996), American banjo player
- Courtney Johnson (water polo) (born 1974), American water polo player

== See also ==
- Kortnei Johnson (born 1997), American sprinter
