= Chuan Hung-ping =

Taiwanese diver

Personal information
- Native name
- Traditional Chinese: 莊宏斌
- Simplified Chinese: 庄宏斌
Transcriptions
Standard Mandarin
- Hanyu Pinyin: Zhuāng Hóngbīn
- Wade–Giles: Chuang Hung-pin
Yue: Cantonese
- Jyutping: Zong1 Hung4 Ban1
- Nationality: Taiwanese
- Born: 15 April 1978 (age 47)

Sport
- Sport: Diving

Chuan Hung-ping (traditional Chinese: 莊宏斌; simplified Chinese: 庄宏斌; pinyin: Zhuāng Hóngbīn; born 15 April 1978) is a Taiwanese diver. He competed in the men's 10 metre platform event at the 1996 Summer Olympics. He placed 36th out of the 37 in the event.

Chuan competed at the 1994 World Aquatics Championships. His 31st-place finish led to his failing to qualify for the 1994 Asian Games. He received a silver medal at the Pacific Ocean Games held in Cali, Colombia, in 1995. Chuan competed in the 10-metre platform events at the 1997 East Asian Games, where he placed 10th, and at the 1997 Summer Universiade, where he ranked 21st.

== Biography ==
Chuan competed at the China Cup International Diving Competition (Chinese: 中國杯國際跳水賽) in Shanghai in 1992. Although he did not make the finals, his team's overall score won them 5th place in the team event. Chuan competed in the Asian Cup Swimming Competition (Chinese: 亞洲杯游泳賽) in Hiroshima, Japan, in 1992. For the competition, he trained at the National Sports Training Center, and his team's head coach was Hsu An-tung (Chinese: 許安東).

To prepare for the 1993 East Asian Games in Shanghai, Chuan traveled to Nanjing for training in January of that year. At the National Zhongzheng Cup Diving Competition (Chinese: 全國中正杯跳水賽) held in March 1993, Chuan represented Guoguang Laboratory School in the junior high school boy's division, winning first place in the one-metre springboard event. He competed in the World Aquatics Junior Diving Championships in London in August 1993 and placed fourth in the diving platform event. Chuan participated in the selection competition for the 1994 Asian Games in June 1994. In the first day of the competition, he placed first, scoring 579.25 points in the diving platform event. In the second and final day of the competition, he maintained his first-place finish and was chosen to compete in the selection for the Asian Games. Chuan participated in the diving competition for the 10-metre platform at the 1994 World Aquatics Championships in Rome. Having placed 31st in the preliminaries with a score of 238.11, he failed to qualify for the 1994 Asian Games. His coach, Chen Tsung-hsien (Chinese: 陳聰獻), attributed the underperformance to his lack of experience in international competitions. Chuan competed in the platform diving event at the Pacific Ocean Games in Cali, Colombia, in 1995. With a score of 499.16 points, he received a silver medal.

Chuan was chosen to compete in the 1996 Summer Olympics. On 10 July 1996, Taiwan Television aired the second episode of its special program "Olympic Night" (Chinese: 奧運之夜). Chuang, who was one of the athletes featured, demonstrated his diving prowess, performing forward somersaults, back somersaults, and handstands dives. At the Olympics, he competed in the men's 10 metre platform event, placing 36th out of 37 after scoring 220.89.

At the National Zhongzheng Cup Diving Competition (Chinese: 全國中正杯跳水賽) in October 1996, Chuan represented Chinese Culture University in the university men's division and placed first at the 10-metre platform event. Later that month, he competed in a district competition. He repeated his win from the previous year in the 10-metre platform event, scoring 488.3 points. Chuan was chosen to compete in the 1997 East Asian Games. In the 10-metre platform diving event, he finished at the bottom of the group of 10 athletes, scoring 403.68 points. At the 1997 Summer Universiade in Sicily, Italy, Chuan competed in the 10-metre platform preliminaries. With a score of 198.87 points, he placed 21st and did not progress to the next stage of the competition. Chuan competed in the District Sports Diving Competition (Chinese: 區運跳水賽) in Kaohsiung in 1997. He received a gold medal in the platform diving event, scoring 42.155 points.
