= Alberty =

Alberty is a surname, believed to have been derived from the Saxon personnel name Ethelbert, who was the former King of Kent. Notable people with the surname include:

- Eliza Bushyhead Alberty (1839–1919), Cherokee businesswoman, school administrator, and educator
- Gyula Alberty (1903–1942), Hungarian footballer
- Karl-Otto Alberty (1933–2015), German actor
- Robert A. Alberty (1921–2014), American chemist
- Vivián Alberty (born 1973), Puerto Rican diver

== See also ==
- Alberti (surname)
