= Francisco Pérez (diver) =

Mexican diver

Personal information
- Nationality: Mexican
- Born: 1 July 1976 (age 49)

Sport
- Sport: Diving

Francisco Pérez (born 1 July 1976) is a Mexican diver. He competed in the men's 10 metre platform event at the 2000 Summer Olympics.
