= Tony Lawson (diver) =

Australian diver (born 1972)

Personal information
- Nationality: Australian
- Born: 17 February 1972 (age 54) Newcastle, New South Wales, Australia

Sport
- Sport: Diving

Tony Lawson (born 17 February 1972) is an Australian diver. He competed in the men's 10 metre platform event at the 1996 Summer Olympics.
