= Dörte Lindner =

German diver

Personal information
- Nationality: German
- Born: 22 March 1974 (age 52) Rostock, Mecklenburg-Vorpommern, East Germany

Sport
- Sport: Diving
Medal record
Women's diving
Representing Germany
Olympic Games
| Bronze medal – third place | 2000 Sydney | 3 m springboard |
European Championships
| Silver medal – second place | 1995 Vienna | 1 m springboard |
| Silver medal – second place | 2000 Helsinki | 3 m springboard |
| Silver medal – second place | 2000 Helsinki | 3 m synchro |
| Bronze medal – third place | 1997 Seville | 1 m springboard |
Summer Universiade
| Bronze medal – third place | 1995 Fukuoka | 3 m springboard |

Dörte Lindner (born 22 March 1974) is a German diver who won a bronze medal at the 2000 Summer Olympics. Lindner also competed for USC and won the Pac-10 conference championships in the Women's 1m and 3m Springboard in 1998.

Lindner was born in Rostock, Mecklenburg-Vorpommern.
