= Choe Song-hui =

North Korean diver

Personal information
- Native name: 최성희
- Nationality: North Korean
- Born: 7 May 1980 (age 44)

Sport
- Sport: Diving

Choe Song-hui (born 7 May 1980) is a North Korean diver. She competed in the women's 3 metre springboard event at the 2000 Summer Olympics.
