= Yu Chang-jun =

South Korean diver

Personal information
- Nationality: South Korean
- Born: 20 July 1981 (age 43)

Sport
- Sport: Diving

Yu Chang-jun (born 20 July 1981) is a South Korean diver. He competed in the men's 10 metre platform event at the 2000 Summer Olympics.
