= South Korea at the 1993 East Asian Games =

- IOC code: KOR
- NOC: Korean Olympic Committee

in Shanghai
- Competitors: 202 in 12 sports
- Officials: 64
- Medals Ranked 3rd: Gold 23 Silver 28 Bronze 40 Total 91

East Asian Games appearances
- 1993; 1997; 2001; 2005; 2009; 2013

South Korea competed at the 1993 East Asian Games held in Shanghai, China PR from May 9, 1993 to May 18, 1993. South Korea finished third with 23 gold medals, 28 silver medals, and 40 bronze medals.

== Medal summary ==
Sport	Gold	Silver	Bronze	Total
Judo	7	4	5	16
Boxing	4	3	5	12
Weightlifting	4	3	1	8
Athletics	3	4	5	12
Swimming	2	2	10	14
Badminton	1	2	4	7
Gymnastics	1	1	5	7
Football	1	0	0	1
Rowing	0	4	2	6
Bowling	0	3	1	4
Basketball	0	2	0	2
Wushu	0	0	2	2
Totals (12 entries)	23	28	40	91
