= Andrey Kvochinsky =

Belarusian diver

Personal information
- Nationality: Belarusian
- Born: 27 November 1968 (age 56); Minsk, Belarus

Sport
- Sport: Diving

Andrey Kvochinsky (born 27 November 1968) is a Belarusian diver. He competed in the men's 10 metre platform event at the 1996 Summer Olympics.
