= Ng Sui =

Hong Kong diver (born 1980)

Personal information
- Native name
- Traditional Chinese: 吳帥
- Simplified Chinese: 吴帅
Transcriptions
Standard Mandarin
- Hanyu Pinyin: Wú Shuài
- Wade–Giles: Wu Shuai
Yue: Cantonese
- Jyutping: Ng4 Seoi3
- Nationality: Hong Konger
- Born: 28 August 1980 (age 45)

Sport
- Sport: Diving

Alex Ng Sui (traditional Chinese: 吳帥; simplified Chinese: 吴帅; born 28 August 1980) is a Hong Kong diver. He competed in the men's 10 metre platform event at the 1996 Summer Olympics. He placed 33rd out of 37 contestants.

Born in China, Ng immigrated with his family to Hong Kong in 1991. He began diving when he was seven years old and started competing two years later. He placed first in the boys 14–15 age group in the 1 metre springboard event at the 1994 Asia-Pacific aquatics competition. Ng competed in two Grand Prix competitions in New Zealand and Australia in 1997. At the 1997 East Asian Games, Ng was the lowest scorer among the eight divers. He competed for Hong Kong at the 1998 Asian Games, finishing in 8th place in the men's three-metre springboard event. Ng retired from competition in 2000 after having suffered from a spinal fracture the previous year.

== Career ==
Ng was born in China. According to Ng, his parents urged him to get involved in sports because he frequently was ill as a child. He initially took up gymnastics and later shifted to diving when he was seven years old after demonstrating skill in the sport. Two years after starting diving, he began participating in competitions. His family immigrated to Hong Kong in 1991. In China, Ng had been a diver. After moving to Hong Kong, he began committing more time to diving training once he saw and responded to a Hong Kong newspaper advertisement that promoting diving. At the 1994 Asia-Pacific aquatics competition held at the Talkatora Swimming Pool in New Delhi, Ng ranked first in the boys 14–15 age group in the 1 metre springboard event with a score of 324.75. During the Asia Pacific Age Group Championships held in 1995 in Colombo, Sri Lanka, Ng competed in the one-metre springboard event, where he received a silver medal. At the Asian Championships for diving held in Bangkok in 1996, he scored 489.03, placing seventh against 13 participants.

Ng stopped attending school in 1996 to begin preparing for the 1996 Summer Olympics. Although the Hong Kong Sports Institute gave him temporary support for training in the Olympics, he was one of four Hong Kong Olympians out of 23 not to be beneficiaries of scholarships. Ng took part in the Olympics as the youngest athlete from Hong Kong. He and swimmer Mark Kwok were the only Hong Kong Olympians who took part in the 1996 Summer Olympics opening ceremony because their teammates largely had not arrived yet. He participated in the men's 10 metre platform event. On the diving platform before he began diving, he talked and bantered with the Chinese divers Tian Liang and Xiao Hailiang. Over the course of six dives, Ng had a total score of 273.30 and did not advance past the preliminaries. Out of 37 participants, he came in 33rd. Ng's dives were on the simpler end compared to other divers. In his first dive, he had a difficulty score of 1.6 and received 31.68 points from a forward 1.5 somersault. His next dives received scores of 41.04, 54.60, 56.70, and 51.03. In his last dive, Ng got nervous after seeing the Swedish diver Jimmy Sjödin receive high scores. In his last dive did a forward 1.5 somersault containing two twists in which he received a score of only 38.25. His last dive was the last time a Hong Kong Olympian competed representing British Hong Kong in an Olympics. Before the Olympics, Ng's main training base was in China, though he had spent six years living in Hong Kong.

In 1997, Ng participated in two Grand Prix competitions in New Zealand and Australia. In the six months preceding the 1997 East Asian Games, Ng trained and participated in contests in Los Angeles. Ng was trained by Tang Kei Shan. Ng was the only Hong Kong diver selected to compete in the East Asian Games. He competed in the men's one-metre springboard at the 1997 East Asian Games, where he was the lowest scorer among all eight divers. His performance was owing to his choosing dives ranked as easier than the other competitors' instead of his performing the dives in a worse way. Whereas his competitors routinely performed dives with difficulty scores of 2.6 to 3.1, Ng's difficulty scores were at 2.2, 2.3, 2.4 twice, and 2.6 twice.

Between 1995 and 1998, Ng alternated living between the United States and mainland China. In the United States, he met up with his family who had moved there. In mainland China, he worked with members of the Shanghai diving squad. According to Ng, he trained in mainland China because "the equipment in Hong Kong is not up-to-standard, and the training time is insufficient." In 1998, Ng competed in the 1-metre and 3-metre springboard events at the Hong Kong Diving Championships in the Kowloon Park Swimming Pool. In the middle of that year, he received a silver medal at the Asia-Pacific Age Group Diving Championships. Ng was the only diver chosen to compete for Hong Kong at the 1998 Asian Games in Bangkok. In the men's three-metre springboard event, he finished in 8th place among the 12 finalists. With a score of 507.09, he had a consistent performance through scores that were between 6.5 and 7.5.

In October 1999, Ng suffered a spinal fracture. He announced in March 2000 that he would retire from diving owing to how serious his injury was so would not compete in the 2000 Summer Olympics. He said that he would become a diving coach.

== Personal life ==
In 2012, Ng had a daughter with actress Shirley Yeung. Ng and Yeung had been secondary school classmates.
