= Zhang Jin (badminton) =

Chinese badminton player

Zhang Jin 张瑾
Personal information
- Born: 9 May 1972 (age 54)
- Height: 1.69 m (5 ft 7 in)

Sport
- Country: China
- Sport: Badminton
- Handedness: Right
- Event: Women's & mixed doubles

Women's & mixed doubles
- BWF profile
Medal record
Women's badminton
Representing China
World Cup
| Bronze medal – third place | 1995 Jakarta | Mixed doubles |
Asian Championships
| Silver medal – second place | 1995 Beijing | Mixed doubles |
| Bronze medal – third place | 1995 Beijing | Women's doubles |
| Bronze medal – third place | 1994 Shanghai | Women's doubles |
Asian Cup
| Bronze medal – third place | 1996 Seoul | Women's doubles |
East Asian Games
| Gold medal – first place | 1997 Busan | Women's doubles |
| Gold medal – first place | 1997 Busan | Women's team |
| Silver medal – second place | 1997 Busan | Mixed doubles |

Zhang Jin (Chinese: 张瑾; born 9 May 1972) is a former Chinese badminton player. She was the gold medalists at the 1997 Busan East Asian Games in the women's doubles and team events, also won a silver medal in the mixed doubles.

== Achievements ==
=== World Cup ===
Mixed doubles
| Year | Venue | Partner | Opponent | Score | Result |
|---|---|---|---|---|---|
| 1995 | Istora Senayan; Jakarta, Indonesia | (China) Jiang Xin | (Indonesia) Tri Kusharjanto (Indonesia) Minarti Timur | 3–15, 10–15 | Bronze |

=== Asian Championships ===
Women's doubles
| Year | Venue | Partner | Opponent | Score | Result |
|---|---|---|---|---|---|
| 1994 | Shanghai Gymnasium; Shanghai, China | (China) Peng Xinyong | (China) Chen Ying (China) Wu Yuhong | 3–15, 9–15 | Bronze |
| 1995 | Olympic Sports Center Gymnasium; Beijing, China | (China) Peng Xinyong | (China) Qin Yiyuan (China) Tang Yongshu | 3–15, 8–15 | Bronze |

Mixed doubles
| Year | Venue | Partner | Opponent | Score | Result |
|---|---|---|---|---|---|
| 1995 | Olympic Sports Center Gymnasium; Beijing, China | (China) Jiang Xin | (China) Liu Jianjun (China) Ge Fei | 4–15, 15–12, 5–15 | Silver |

=== Asian Cup ===
Women's doubles
| Year | Venue | Partner | Opponent | Score | Result |
|---|---|---|---|---|---|
| 1996 | Olympic Gymnasium No. 2 Seoul, South Korea | (China) Gao Jian | (South Korea) Jang Hye-ock (South Korea) Chung So-young | 1–15, 3–15 | Bronze |

=== East Asian Games ===
Women's doubles
| Year | Venue | Partner | Opponent | Score | Result |
|---|---|---|---|---|---|
| 1997 | Pukyong National University Gymnasium; Busan, South Korea | (China) Peng Xinyong | (China) Liu Lufang (China) Wang Li | 15–8, 15–6 | Gold |

Mixed doubles
| Year | Venue | Partner | Opponent | Score | Result |
|---|---|---|---|---|---|
| 1997 | Pukyong National University Gymnasium; Busan, South Korea | (China) Yang Ming | (South Korea) Lee Dong-soo (South Korea) Yim Kyung-jin | 11–15, 7–15 | Silver |

=== IBF World Grand Prix ===
The World Badminton Grand Prix sanctioned by International Badminton Federation (IBF) since 1983.

Women's doubles
| Year | Tournament | Partner | Opponent | Score | Result |
|---|---|---|---|---|---|
| 1994 | Brunei Open | (China) Peng Xinyong | (England) Karen Chapman (England) Joanne Muggeridge | 15–11, 12–16, 15–5 | (gold) Winner |
| 1994 | Dutch Open | (China) Peng Xinyong | (China) Qin Yiyuan (China) Tang Yongshu | 15–4, 15–7 | (gold) Winner |
| 1994 | German Open | (China) Peng Xinyong | (Denmark) Marlene Thomsen (Denmark) Anne Mette Bille | 15–11, 15–5 | (gold) Winner |
| 1995 | Sydney Open | (China) Peng Xinyong | (Indonesia) Carmelita (Indonesia) Etty Tantri | 15–9, 12–15, 15–4 | (gold) Winner |
| 1996 | Vietnam Open | (China) Peng Xinyong | (China) Sun Jian (China) Zeng Yaqiong | 15–9, 12–15, 15–8 | (gold) Winner |

Mixed doubles
| Year | Tournament | Partner | Opponent | Score | Result |
|---|---|---|---|---|---|
| 1994 | Indonesia Open | (China) Jiang Xin | (Indonesia) Flandy Limpele (Indonesia) Dede Hasanah | 15–3, 15–11 | (gold) Winner |
| 1996 | Vietnam Open | (China) Liu Yong | (Indonesia) Sandiarto (Indonesia) Finarsih | 15–9, 18–15 | (gold) Winner |
