= Yelena Ivanova (diver) =

Kazakhstani diver

Personal information
- Nationality: Kazakhstani
- Born: 6 October 1973 (age 52)

Sport
- Sport: Diving

Yelena Ivanova (Елена Ивановна Иванова, born 6 October 1973) is a Kazakhstani former diver. She competed in the women's 3 metre springboard event at the 1996 Summer Olympics.
