= Pramote Teerawiwatana =

Thai badminton player

Personal information
- Born: 14 June 1967 Kanchanaburi Province, Thailand
- Died: 4 October 2012 (aged 45) Bangkok, Thailand
- Height: 1.74 m (5 ft 9 in)
- Weight: 65 kg (143 lb)

Sport
- Country: Thailand
- Sport: Badminton
- Handedness: Right

Men's doubles
- Highest ranking: 1
- BWF profile
Medal record
Men's badminton
Representing Thailand
World Cup
Silver medal – second place	1995 Jakarta	Men's doubles
Asian Games
Silver medal – second place	2002 Busan	Men's doubles
Silver medal – second place	1998 Bangkok	Men's doubles
Asian Championships
Bronze medal – third place	2002 Bangkok	Men's doubles
Bronze medal – third place	1999 Kuala Lumpur	Men's doubles
Bronze medal – third place	1995 Beijing	Men's doubles
Southeast Asian Games
Gold medal – first place	1999 Bandar Seri Begawan	Men's doubles
Silver medal – second place	2003 Ho Chi Minh	Men's team
Bronze medal – third place	2001 Kuala Lumpur	Men's team
Bronze medal – third place	1999 Bandar Seri Begawan	Men's team
Bronze medal – third place	1997 Jakarta	Men's doubles
Bronze medal – third place	1997 Jakarta	Men's team
Bronze medal – third place	1995 Chiang Mai	Men's doubles
Bronze medal – third place	1995 Chiang Mai	Men's team
Bronze medal – third place	1993 Singapore	Mixed doubles
Bronze medal – third place	1993 Singapore	Men's team

Pramote Teerawiwatana (Thai: ปราโมทย์ ธีระวิวัฒน์; 14 June 1967 – 4 October 2012) was a badminton player from Thailand.

== Career ==
He played in six Southeast Asian Games, won the men's doubles gold in 1999 Brunei as his best results. Teerawiwatana was two times silver medalists at the Asian Games in 1998 Bangkok and 2002 Busan. He reached a career high as World No. 2 in the men's doubles event with two different partners.

Teerawiwatana competed in four consecutives Olympic Games from 1992 to 2004 in the men's doubles event. At the 2000 Sydney, Teerawiwatana competed with Tesana Panvisvas and won the first round against Dutch pair Dennis Lens and Quinten van Dalm 15–11, 15–7. In the second round they lost to a Malaysian Choong Tan Fook and Lee Wan Wah in the rubber games 15–11, 15–17, 9–15. He again participated at the 2004 Athens with Panvisvas, where they defeated Ashley Brehaut and Travis Denney of Australia in the first round, then were defeated in the round of 16 by Choong Tan Fook and Lee Wan Wah of Malaysia.

== Achievements ==
=== World Cup ===
Men's doubles
Year	Venue	Partner	Opponent	Score	Result
1995	Jakarta, Indonesia	(Thailand) Sakrapee Thongsari	(Indonesia) Rexy Mainaky (Indonesia) Ricky Subagja	4–15, 9–15	Silver

=== Asian Games ===
Men's doubles
Year	Venue	Partner	Opponent	Score	Result
2002	Gangseo Gymnasium; Busan, South Korea	(Thailand) Tesana Panvisvas	(South Korea) Lee Dong-soo (South Korea) Yoo Yong-sung	11–15, 6–15	Silver
1998	Thammasat Gymnasium 2 Bangkok, Thailand	(Thailand) Siripong Siripool	(Indonesia) Rexy Mainaky (Indonesia) Ricky Subagja	5–15, 10–15	Silver

=== Asian Championships ===
Men's doubles
Year	Venue	Partner	Opponent	Score	Result
2002	Bangkok, Thailand	(Thailand) Tesana Panvisvas	(Indonesia) Sigit Budiarto (Indonesia) Candra Wijaya	16–17, 7–15	Bronze
1999	Kuala Lumpur, Malaysia	(Thailand) Tesana Panvisvas	(South Korea) Kim Dong-moon (South Korea) Ha Tae-kwon	11–15, 7–15	Bronze
1995	Beijing, China	(Thailand) Sakrapee Thongsari	(China) Huang Zhanzhong (China) Jiang Xin	11–15, 5–15	Bronze

=== Southeast Asian Games ===
Men's doubles
Year	Venue	Partner	Opponent	Score	Result
1999	Hassanal Bolkiah Sports Complex; Bandar Seri Begawan, Brunei	(Thailand) Tesana Panvisvas	(Indonesia) Flandy Limpele (Indonesia) Eng Hian	15–8, 8–15, 15–13	Gold
1997	Asia-Africa hall, Gelora Bung Karno Sports Complex; Jakarta, Indonesia	(Thailand) Siripong Siripool	(Thailand) Khunakorn Sudhisodhi (Thailand) Kitipon Kitikul	Walkover	Bronze
1995	Gymnasium 3, 700th Anniversary Sport Complex; Chiang Mai, Thailand	(Thailand) Sakrapee Thongsari	(Indonesia) Rexy Mainaky (Indonesia) Ricky Subagja	5–15, 1–15	Bronze

Mixed doubles
Year	Venue	Partner	Opponent	Score	Result
1993	Singapore Badminton Hall; Singapore	(Thailand) Ladawan Mulasartsatorn	(Indonesia) Rudy Gunawan (Indonesia) Eliza Nathanael	12–15, 3–15	Bronze

=== IBF World Grand Prix ===
The World Badminton Grand Prix sanctioned by International Badminton Federation (IBF) since 1983.

Men's doubles
Year	Tournament	Partner	Opponent	Score	Result
2003	Indonesia Open	(Thailand) Tesana Panvisvas	(China) Sang Yang (China) Zheng Bo	17–16, 15–17, 5–15	(silver) Runner-up
2002	China Open	(Thailand) Tesana Panvisvas	(Malaysia) Chan Chong Ming (Malaysia) Chew Choon Eng	15–8, 15–8	(gold) Winner
2001	Thailand Open	(Thailand) Tesana Panvisvas	(Indonesia) Sigit Budiarto (Indonesia) Luluk Hadiyanto	7–5, 5–7, 6–8	(silver) Runner-up
1995	Malaysia Open	(Thailand) Sakrapee Thongsari	(Malaysia) Cheah Soon Kit (Malaysia) Yap Kim Hock	5–15, 15–12, 15–5	(gold) Winner
1994	Thailand Open	(Thailand) Sakrapee Thongsari	(Indonesia) Antonius Ariantho (Indonesia) Denny Kantono	15–12, 12–15, 10–15	(silver) Runner-up
1994	Malaysia Open	(Thailand) Sakrapee Thongsari	(Indonesia) Ricky Subagja (Indonesia) Rexy Mainaky	5–15, 16–18	(silver) Runner-up
1994	Japan Open	(Thailand) Sakrapee Thongsari	(Indonesia) Ricky Subagja (Indonesia) Denny Kantono	11–15, 15–12, 16–18	(silver) Runner-up
1993	Hong Kong Open	(Thailand) Sakrapee Thongsari	(Indonesia) Antonius Ariantho (Indonesia) Denny Kantono	15–10, 3–15, 14–17	(silver) Runner-up
1993	Japan Open	(Thailand) Sakrapee Thongsari	(China) Chen Kang (China) Chen Hongyong	10–15, 10–15	(silver) Runner-up
1992	Singapore Open	(Thailand) Sakrapee Thongsari	(China) Chen Kang (China) Chen Hongyong	8–15, 6–15	(silver) Runner-up

=== IBF International ===
Men's doubles
Year	Tournament	Partner	Opponent	Score	Result
1993	Brunei Open	(Thailand) Sakrapee Thongsari	(Indonesia) Herly Djaenudin (Indonesia) Joko Mardianto	15–5, 4–15, 15–6	(gold) Winner
