= Michelle Davison =

American diver

Personal information
- Born: October 22, 1979 (age 46) Columbia, South Carolina, U.S.

Sport
- Country: United States
- Sport: Diving

Michelle Davison (born October 22, 1979) is an American diver. She was born in Columbia, South Carolina. She competed at the 2000 Summer Olympics in Sydney, in the women's 3 metre springboard.
