= Diving at the 1995 Summer Universiade =

The Diving competition in the 1995 Summer Universiade were held in Fukuoka, Japan.

== Medal overview ==
Event	Gold	Silver	Bronze
Men's 1-Meter Springboard	Zhao Xin (CHN)	Huang Wen (CHN)	Brian Earley (USA)
Men's 3-Meter Springboard	Fernando Platas (MEX)	Kevin McMahon (USA)	Zhao Xin (CHN)
Men's Platform	Cheng Wei (CHN)	Tu Bin (CHN)	Fernando Platas (MEX)
Men's Team	China (CHN)	United States (USA)	Canada (CAN)
Women's 1-Meter Springboard	Helga Lindner (GER)	Silke Krüger (GER)	Yu Xiaoling (CHN)
Women's 3-Meter Springboard	Rao Lang (CHN)	María José Alcalá (MEX)	Dörte Lindner (GER)
Women's Platform	Eileen Richetelli (USA)	Irina Vyguzova (KAZ)	Chi Meilan (CHN)
Women's Team	Germany (GER)	United States (USA)	China (CHN)

== Medal table ==
Rank	Nation	Gold	Silver	Bronze	Total
1	China (CHN)	4	2	4	10
2	Germany (GER)	2	1	1	4
3	United States (USA)	1	3	1	5
4	Mexico (MEX)	1	1	1	3
5	Kazakhstan (KAZ)	0	1	0	1
6	Canada (CAN)	0	0	1	1
Totals (6 entries)		8	8	8	24
