= Olha Yefimenko =

Ukrainian diver

Personal information
- Nationality: Ukrainian
- Born: 17 May 1978 (age 47)

Sport
- Sport: Diving

Olha Yefimenko (born 17 May 1978) is a Ukrainian diver. She competed in the women's 3 metre springboard event at the 2000 Summer Olympics.
