= Iryna Pissareva =

Ukrainian diver

Personal information
- Nationality: Ukrainian
- Born: 4 May 1974 (age 52)

Sport
- Sport: Diving
Medal record
Women's diving
European Junior Diving Championships
Representing Soviet Union
Gold medal – first place	1988 Amersfoort	3 m springboard
Silver medal – second place	1990 Frankfurt am Main	10 m platform
Representing Ukraine
Bronze medal – third place	1992 Leeds	3 m springboard
Bronze medal – third place	1992 Leeds	10 m platform

Iryna Pissareva (born 4 May 1974) is a Ukrainian diver. She competed in the women's 3 metre springboard event at the 1996 Summer Olympics.
