= Nino Qazarashvili =

Georgian diver

Personal information
- Nationality: Georgian
- Born: 4 December 1979 (age 45); Tbilisi, Georgian SSR, Soviet Union

Sport
- Sport: Diving

Nino Qazarashvili (born 4 December 1979) is a Georgian diver. She competed in the women's 3 metre springboard event at the 1996 Summer Olympics.
