= Svetlana Ishkova =

Argentine diver

Personal information
- Nationality: Argentine
- Born: 13 December 1978 (age 46)

Sport
- Sport: Diving

Svetlana Ishkova (born 13 December 1978) is an Argentine diver. She competed in the women's 3 metre springboard event at the 2000 Summer Olympics.
