= Rubén Santos =

Spanish diver

Personal information
- Nationality: Spanish
- Born: 25 September 1976 (age 49)

Sport
- Sport: Diving
Medal record
Men's diving
Representing Spain
European Championships
Silver medal – second place	1997 Seville	3 m synchro

Rubén Santos (born 25 September 1976) is a Spanish diver. He competed in the men's 10 metre platform event at the 2000 Summer Olympics.
