= Samat Muratov =

Kazakhstani diver

Personal information
- Nationality: Kazakhstani
- Born: 17 March 1976 (age 50)

Sport
- Sport: Diving

Samat Muratov (Самат Мухаметалиевич Муратов, born 17 March 1976) is a Kazakhstani diver. He competed in the men's 10 metre platform event at the 1996 Summer Olympics.
