= Eileen Richetelli =

American diver

Personal information
- Born: 31 May 1972 (age 54) Milford, Connecticut
- Home town: Milford, Connecticut
- Education: Stanford

Sport
- Country: USA
- Sport: Diving
Medal record
Women's diving
Representing the United States
Pan American Games
Gold medal – first place	1991 Havana	Platform
Summer Universiade
Gold medal – first place	1995 Fukuoka	Platform

Eileen Richetelli is a former American diver. She won a gold medal in platform diving at the 1991 Pan American Games.

== Early life ==
From Milford, Connecticut, Richetelli attended high school at Lauralton Hall, where she won four individual event diving state championships and helped lead the Crusaders to one team championship.

Richetelli attended Stanford University and was a member of the Cardinal swim and dive team. While at Stanford, she won five individual event NCAA titles, four NCAA team titles, was named an All-American, and was named NCAA Diver of the Year twice.

== International career ==
Richetelli was a member of the United States diving team from 1991-1997.

She won a gold medal in platform diving at the 1991 Pan American Games. She also received a gold medal at the 1995 Summer Universiade in Fukuoka. Richetelli was an alternate on the 1996 United States Olympic diving team.

== Personal life ==
Richetelli is a member of athletic Halls of Fame at Stanford, Lauralton Hall, and the Milford Sports Hall of Fame.
