= 1995 Badminton World Cup =

Badminton championships

Tournament details
- Dates: 14–17 September 1995
- Edition: 17th
- Total prize money: US$180,000
- Venue: Istora Senayan
- Location: Jakarta, Indonesia

The 1995 Badminton World Cup was the seventeenth edition of an international tournament Badminton World Cup. The event was held in Jakarta, Indonesia from 14 to 17 September 1995 with a total prize money of US$180,000. Indonesia won all the titles except the women's singles event, which was won by China.

== Medalists ==
Event	Gold	Silver	Bronze
Men's singles	(Indonesia) Joko Suprianto	(Indonesia) Alan Budikusuma	(China) Chen Gang
Men's singles	(Indonesia) Joko Suprianto	(Indonesia) Alan Budikusuma	(Indonesia) Ardy Wiranata
Women's singles	(China) Ye Zhaoying	(Indonesia) Susi Susanti	(Indonesia) Mia Audina
Women's singles	(China) Ye Zhaoying	(Indonesia) Susi Susanti	(Sweden) Lim Xiaoqing
Men's doubles	(Indonesia) Rexy Mainaky (Indonesia) Ricky Subagja	(Thailand) Pramote Teerawiwatana (Thailand) Sakrapee Thongsari	(Malaysia) Cheah Soon Kit (Malaysia) Yap Kim Hock
Men's doubles	(Indonesia) Rexy Mainaky (Indonesia) Ricky Subagja	(Thailand) Pramote Teerawiwatana (Thailand) Sakrapee Thongsari	(Indonesia) Antonius Ariantho (Indonesia) Denny Kantono
Women's doubles	(Indonesia) Eliza Nathanael (Indonesia) Zelin Resiana	(Indonesia) Finarsih (Indonesia) Lili Tampi	(Denmark) Helene Kirkegaard (Denmark) Rikke Olsen
Women's doubles	(Indonesia) Eliza Nathanael (Indonesia) Zelin Resiana	(Indonesia) Finarsih (Indonesia) Lili Tampi	(England) Julie Bradbury (England) Joanne Wright
Mixed doubles	(Indonesia) Trikus Heryanto (Indonesia) Minarti Timur	(South Korea) Kim Dong-moon (South Korea) Kim Shin-young	(China) Jiang Xin (China) Zhang Jin
Mixed doubles	(Indonesia) Trikus Heryanto (Indonesia) Minarti Timur	(South Korea) Kim Dong-moon (South Korea) Kim Shin-young	(Indonesia) Flandy Limpele (Indonesia) Rosalina Riseu

== Men's singles ==
=== Finals ===
Semi-finals
(Indonesia) Joko Suprianto	15	15
(China) Chen Gang	2	7
(Indonesia) Alan Budikusuma	15	15
(Indonesia) Ardy Wiranata	10	3

Final
(Indonesia) Joko Suprianto	15	11	15
(Indonesia) Alan Budikusuma	7	15	8

== Women's singles ==
=== Finals ===
Semi-finals
(China) Ye Zhaoying	11	4	11
(Indonesia) Mia Audina	6	11	7
(Sweden) Lim Xiaoqing	2	5
(Indonesia) Susi Susanti	11	11

Final
(China) Ye Zhaoying	12	2	12
(Indonesia) Susi Susanti	9	11	9

== Men's doubles ==
=== Finals ===
Semi-finals
(Indonesia) Rexy Mainaky (Indonesia) Ricky Subagja	18	15
(Malaysia) Cheah Soon Kit (Malaysia) Yap Kim Hock	13	9
(Thailand) Pramote Teerawiwatana (Thailand) Sakrapee Thongsari	15	15
(Indonesia) Antonius Ariantho (Indonesia) Denny Kantono	8	8

Final
(Indonesia) Rexy Mainaky (Indonesia) Ricky Subagja	15	15
(Thailand) Pramote Teerawiwatana (Thailand) Sakrapee Thongsari	4	9

== Women's doubles ==
=== Finals ===
Semi-finals
(Indonesia) Eliza Nathanael (Indonesia) Zelin Resiana	15	15
(Denmark) Helene Kirkegaard (Denmark) Rikke Olsen	10	9
(Indonesia) Finarsih (Indonesia) Lili Tampi	11	15	15
(England) Julie Bradbury (England) Joanne Wright	15	4	3

Final
(Indonesia) Eliza Nathanael (Indonesia) Zelin Resiana	10	15
(Indonesia) Finarsih (Indonesia) Lili Tampi	15	11^{r}

== Mixed doubles ==
=== Finals ===
Semi-finals
(South Korea) Kim Dong-moon (South Korea) Kim Shin-young	9	15	17
(Indonesia) Flandy Limpele (Indonesia) Rosalina Riseu	15	9	14
(Indonesia) Trikus Heryanto (Indonesia) Minarti Timur	15	15
(China) Jiang Xin (China) Zhang Jin	3	10

Final
(South Korea) Kim Dong-moon (South Korea) Kim Shin-young	9	18	12
(Indonesia) Trikus Heryanto (Indonesia) Minarti Timur	15	13	15
