= Mohamed Azreen Bahari =

Malaysian diver (born 1984)

Personal information
- Nationality: Malaysian
- Born: 13 June 1984 (age 41) Kuala Lumpur

Sport
- Country: Malaysia
- Sport: Diving

Mohd Azheem Bahari (born 13 June 1984) is a Malaysian diver. He competed in the men's 10 metre platform event at the 2000 Summer Olympics.
