= Badminton at the 1995 SEA Games =

Badminton tournament

1995 SEA Games
Tournament details
- Dates: 9 – 17 December
- Edition: 18th
- Venue: Gymnasium 3, 700th Anniversary Sport Complex
- Location: Chiang Mai, Mueang Chiang Mai, Chiang Mai Province, Thailand

A badminton tournament was held at the 1995 SEA Games in Chiang Mai.

== Medalists ==
Event	Gold	Silver	Bronze
Men's singles	(Indonesia) Joko Suprianto	(Indonesia) Ardy Wiranata	(Malaysia) Rashid Sidek
Men's singles	(Indonesia) Joko Suprianto	(Indonesia) Ardy Wiranata	(Malaysia) Ong Ewe Hock
Women's singles	(Indonesia) Susi Susanti	(Thailand) Somharuthai Jaroensiri	(Thailand) Pornsawan Plungwech
Women's singles	(Indonesia) Susi Susanti	(Thailand) Somharuthai Jaroensiri	(Indonesia) Lidya Djaelawijaya
Men's doubles	(Malaysia) Cheah Soon Kit (Malaysia) Yap Kim Hock	(Indonesia) Rexy Mainaky (Indonesia) Ricky Subagja	(Indonesia) Antonius Ariantho (Indonesia) Denny Kantono
Men's doubles	(Malaysia) Cheah Soon Kit (Malaysia) Yap Kim Hock	(Indonesia) Rexy Mainaky (Indonesia) Ricky Subagja	(Thailand) Pramote Teerawiwatana (Thailand) Sakrapee Thongsari
Women's doubles	(Indonesia) Finarsih (Indonesia) Lili Tampi	(Indonesia) Eliza Nathanael (Indonesia) Zelin Resiana	(Thailand) Plernta Boonyarit (Thailand) Pornsawan Plungwech
Women's doubles	(Indonesia) Finarsih (Indonesia) Lili Tampi	(Indonesia) Eliza Nathanael (Indonesia) Zelin Resiana	(Thailand) Dujfan Iangsuwanpatema (Thailand) Ruksita Sookboonmak
Mixed doubles	(Indonesia) Tri Kusharjanto (Indonesia) Minarti Timur	(Indonesia) Denny Kantono (Indonesia) Eliza Nathanael	(Thailand) Khunakorn Sudhisodhi (Thailand) Sujitra Ekmongkolpaisarn
Mixed doubles	(Indonesia) Tri Kusharjanto (Indonesia) Minarti Timur	(Indonesia) Denny Kantono (Indonesia) Eliza Nathanael	(Malaysia) Roslin Hashim (Malaysia) Chor Hooi Yee
Men's team	Indonesia; Joko Suprianto; Ardy Wiranata; Ricky Subagja; Rexy Mainaky; Antonius Ariantho; Denny Kantono; Tri Kusharjanto	Malaysia; Rashid Sidek; Ong Ewe Hock; Cheah Soon Kit; Yap Kim Hock; Roslin Hashim; Soo Beng Kiang; Tan Kim Her	Thailand; Teeranun Chiangta; Kitipon Kitikul; Siripong Siripool; Khunakorn Sudhisodhi; Pramote Teerawiwatana; Sakrapee Thongsari
Men's team	Indonesia; Joko Suprianto; Ardy Wiranata; Ricky Subagja; Rexy Mainaky; Antonius Ariantho; Denny Kantono; Tri Kusharjanto	Malaysia; Rashid Sidek; Ong Ewe Hock; Cheah Soon Kit; Yap Kim Hock; Roslin Hashim; Soo Beng Kiang; Tan Kim Her	Myanmar; Aung Kyaw; Han Ba Bahal; Maung Maung; Win Tun Htein; Zaw Tun Tun; Zaw Win
Women's team	Indonesia; Lidya Djaelawijaya; Eliza Nathanael; Finarsih; Zelin Resiana; Susi Susanti; Lili Tampi; Minarti Timur	Thailand; Plernta Boonyarit; Sujitra Ekmongkolpaisarn; Dujfan Iangsuwanpatema; Somharuthai Jaroensiri; Pornsawan Plungwech; Ruksita Sookboonmak	Malaysia; Ishwarii Boopathy; Chan Chia Fong; Chor Hooi Yee; Kuak Seok Choon; Kuak Sipok Choon; Law Pei Pei; Lim Pek Siah
Women's team	Indonesia; Lidya Djaelawijaya; Eliza Nathanael; Finarsih; Zelin Resiana; Susi Susanti; Lili Tampi; Minarti Timur	Thailand; Plernta Boonyarit; Sujitra Ekmongkolpaisarn; Dujfan Iangsuwanpatema; Somharuthai Jaroensiri; Pornsawan Plungwech; Ruksita Sookboonmak	Singapore; Zarinah Abdullah; Chin Yen Peng; Fatimah Kumin Lim; Zanetta Lee; Lim Chia Siong; Tan Wei Wun; Yong Jui Shan

== Results ==
=== Men's singles ===
Semifinal
(Indonesia) Joko Suprianto	15	15
(Malaysia) Ong Ewe Hock	7	7
(Malaysia) Rashid Sidek	11	10
(Indonesia) Ardy Wiranata	15	15

Final
(Indonesia) Joko Suprianto	15	15
(Indonesia) Ardy Wiranata	10	9

=== Women's singles ===
Semifinal
(Indonesia) Susi Susanti	11	11
(Thailand) Pornsawan Plungwech	6	2
(Thailand) Somharuthai Jaroensiri	12	12
(Indonesia) Lidya Djaelawijaya	11	10

Final
(Indonesia) Susi Susanti	11	11
(Thailand) Somharuthai Jaroensiri	4	0

=== Men's doubles ===
Semi-finals
(Indonesia) Rexy Mainaky (Indonesia) Ricky Subagja	15	15
(Thailand) Pramote Teerawiwatana (Thailand) Sakrapee Thongsari	5	1
(Indonesia) Antonius Ariantho (Indonesia) Denny Kantono	11	15	7
(Malaysia) Cheah Soon Kit (Malaysia) Yap Kim Hock	15	6	15

Final
(Indonesia) Rexy Mainaky (Indonesia) Ricky Subagja	13	9
(Malaysia) Cheah Soon Kit (Malaysia) Yap Kim Hock	15	15

=== Women's doubles ===
Semi-finals
(Indonesia) Eliza Nathanael (Indonesia) Zelin Resiana	15	15
(Thailand) Dujfan Langsuwanpatema (Thailand) Ruksita Sookboonmak	8	6
(Thailand) Plernta Boonyarit (Thailand) Pornsawan Plungwech	7	15	7
(Indonesia) Finarsih (Indonesia) Lili Tampi	15	6	15

Final
(Indonesia) Eliza Nathanael (Indonesia) Zelin Resiana	7	3
(Indonesia) Finarsih (Indonesia) Lili Tampi	15	15

=== Mixed doubles ===
Semi-finals
(Indonesia) Tri Kusharjanto (Indonesia) Minarti Timur	15	15
(Malaysia) Roslin Hashim (Malaysia) Chor Hooi Yee	1	1
(Thailand) Khunakorn Sudhisodhi (Thailand) Sujitra Ekmongkolpaisarn	8	6
(Indonesia) Denny Kantono (Indonesia) Eliza Nathanael	15	15

Final
(Indonesia) Tri Kusharjanto (Indonesia) Minarti Timur	15	15
(Indonesia) Denny Kantono (Indonesia) Eliza Nathanael	8	4

== Medal tally ==
Rank	Nation	Gold	Silver	Bronze	Total
1	Indonesia (IDN)	6	4	2	12
2	Malaysia (MYS)	1	1	4	6
3	Thailand (THA)	0	2	6	8
4	Myanmar (MYA)	0	0	1	1
4	Singapore (SIN)	0	0	1	1
Totals (5 entries)		7	7	14	28
