= Sergey Kudrevich =

Belarusian diver

Personal information
- Nationality: Belarusian
- Born: 6 August 1967 (age 57); Minsk, Belarus

Sport
- Sport: Diving

Sergey Kudrevich (born 6 August 1967) is a Belarusian diver. He competed in the men's 10 metre platform event at the 1996 Summer Olympics.

He was a performer in Cirque du Soleil's show O.
