= Sakrapee Thongsari =

Thai badminton player

Personal information
- Born: 23 June 1962 (age 64)
- Height: 1.70 m (5 ft 7 in)
- Weight: 67 kg (148 lb)

Sport
- Country: Thailand
- Sport: Badminton
- Handedness: Right

Men's doubles
- Highest ranking: 2
- BWF profile
Medal record
Men's badminton
Representing Thailand
World Cup
Silver medal – second place	1995 Jakarta	Men's doubles
Asian Championships
Bronze medal – third place	1995 Beijing	Men's doubles
Southeast Asian Games
Silver medal – second place	1987 Jakarta	Men's doubles
Bronze medal – third place	1995 Chiang Mai	Men's doubles
Bronze medal – third place	1995 Chiang Mai	Men's team
Bronze medal – third place	1993 Singapore	Men's team
Bronze medal – third place	1989 Kuala Lumpur	Men's team
Bronze medal – third place	1987 Jakarta	Men's team

Sakrapee Thongsari (Thai: ศักดิ์ระพี ทองสาริ; born 23 June 1962) is a retired Thai badminton player. He competed at the 1996 Atlanta Olympic Games in the men's doubles event with Pramote Teerawiwatana. Together with Teerawiwatana, they reached a career high as World No. 2 in the men's doubles event. Thongsari had also been a Thai national team coach.

== Achievements ==
=== World Cup ===
Men's doubles
Year	Venue	Partner	Opponent	Score	Result
1995	Jakarta, Indonesia	(Thailand) Pramote Teerawiwatana	(Indonesia) Rexy Mainaky (Indonesia) Ricky Subagja	4–15, 9–15	Silver

=== Asian Championships ===
Men's doubles
Year	Venue	Partner	Opponent	Score	Result
1995	Beijing, China	(Thailand) Pramote Teerawiwatana	(China) Huang Zhanzhong (China) Jiang Xin	11–15, 5–15	Bronze

=== Southeast Asian Games ===
Men's doubles
Year	Venue	Partner	Opponent	Score	Result
1995	Gymnasium 3, 700th Anniversary Sport Complex; Chiang Mai, Thailand	(Thailand) Pramote Teerawiwatana	(Indonesia) Rexy Mainaky (Indonesia) Ricky Subagja	5–15, 1–15	Bronze
1987	Jakarta, Indonesia	(Thailand) Sawei Chanseorasmee	(Indonesia) Liem Swie King (Indonesia) Eddy Hartono	14–17, 9–15	Silver

=== IBF World Grand Prix ===
The World Badminton Grand Prix sanctioned by International Badminton Federation (IBF) since 1983.

Men's doubles
Year	Tournament	Partner	Opponent	Score	Result
1995	Malaysia Open	(Thailand) Pramote Teerawiwatana	(Malaysia) Cheah Soon Kit (Malaysia) Yap Kim Hock	5–15, 15–12, 15–5	(gold) Winner
1994	Thailand Open	(Thailand) Pramote Teerawiwatana	(Indonesia) Antonius Ariantho (Indonesia) Denny Kantono	15–12, 12–15, 10–15	(silver) Runner-up
1994	Malaysia Open	(Thailand) Pramote Teerawiwatana	(Indonesia) Ricky Subagja (Indonesia) Rexy Mainaky	5–15, 16–18	(silver) Runner-up
1994	Japan Open	(Thailand) Pramote Teerawiwatana	(Indonesia) Ricky Subagja (Indonesia) Denny Kantono	11–15, 15–12, 16–18	(silver) Runner-up
1993	Hong Kong Open	(Thailand) Pramote Teerawiwatana	(Indonesia) Antonius Ariantho (Indonesia) Denny Kantono	15–10, 3–15, 14–17	(silver) Runner-up
1993	Japan Open	(Thailand) Pramote Teerawiwatana	(China) Chen Kang (China) Chen Hongyong	10–15, 10–15	(silver) Runner-up
1992	Singapore Open	(Thailand) Pramote Teerawiwatana	(China) Chen Kang (China) Chen Hongyong	8–15, 6–15	(silver) Runner-up
1988	Hong Kong Open	(Thailand) Sawei Chanseorasmee	(South Korea) Lee Sang-bok (South Korea) Lee Kwang-jin	5–15, 14–17	(silver) Runner-up
1988	Chinese Taipei Open	(Thailand) Sawei Chanseorasmee	(Sweden) Pär-Gunnar Jönsson (Sweden) Jan-Eric Antonsson	11–15, 15–9, 15–11	(gold) Winner
1987	German Open	(Thailand) Sawei Chanseorasmee	(England) Martin Dew (England) Dipak Tailor	15–12, 15–10	(gold) Winner

Mixed doubles
Year	Tournament	Partner	Opponent	Score	Result
1988	French Open	(Thailand) Piyathip Sansaniyakulvilai	(South Korea) Park Joo-bong (South Korea) Chung Myung-hee	6–15, 6–15	(silver) Runner-up

=== IBF International ===
Men's doubles
Year	Tournament	Partner	Opponent	Score	Result
1993	Brunei Open	(Thailand) Pramote Teerawiwatana	(Indonesia) Herly Djaenudin (Indonesia) Joko Mardianto	15–5, 4–15, 15–6	(gold) Winner
