= Sandra Ponthus =

French diver

Personal information
- Nationality: French
- Born: 29 November 1976 (age 48); Villeurbanne, France

Sport
- Sport: Diving

Sandra Ponthus (born 29 November 1976) is a French former diver. She competed in the women's 3 metre springboard event at the 2000 Summer Olympics.
