= Choe Myong-hwa =

North Korean diver

Personal information
- Native name: 최명화
- Nationality: North Korean
- Born: 11 May 1976 (age 50)

Sport
- Sport: Diving
Medal record
Representing North Korea
Asian Games
Bronze medal – third place	1998 Bangkok	10m platform

Choe Myong-hwa (born 11 February 1976) is a North Korean diver. She competed at the 1996 Summer Olympics and the 2000 Summer Olympics.
