= Chen Ting =

Taiwanese diver

Personal information
- Nationality: Taiwanese
- Born: 7 May 1983 (age 43)

Sport
- Sport: Diving

Chen Ting (traditional Chinese: 陳婷; simplified Chinese: 陈婷; pinyin: Chén Tíng; born 7 May 1983) is a Taiwanese diver. She competed in the women's 3 metre springboard event at the 2000 Summer Olympics.
