= Pyunik (village) =

Pyunik (Piunik) Փյունիկ
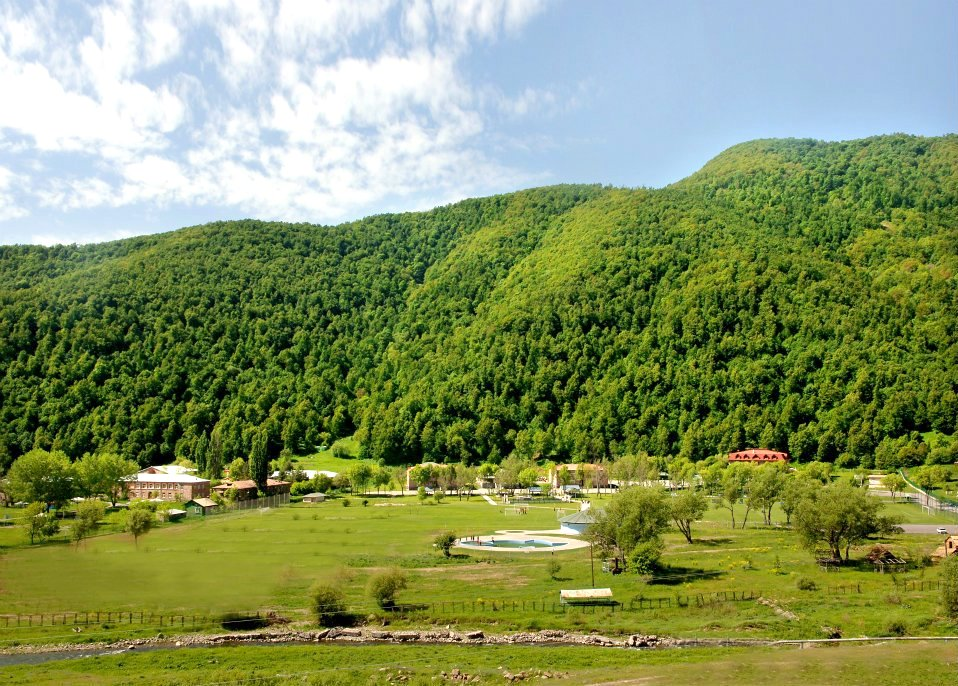

- Location within Armenia
- Coordinates: 40°36′14″N 44°36′51″E
- Country: Armenia
- Province: Kotayk
- Elevation: 1,850 m (6,070 ft)

Population (2011)
  - Total: 316
- Time zone: UTC+4 (AMT)

Pyunik or Piunik (Armenian: Փյունիկ) is a town in the Kotayk Province of Armenia. It is part of the community of Tsaghkadzor. Pyunik is a popular summer resort with several hotels and sports facilities.

== Population ==
According to Statistical Committee of Armenia, the village has a population of 316.
