= Oleh Yanchenko =

Ukrainian diver

Personal information
- Nationality: Ukrainian
- Born: 17 April 1979 (age 47)

Sport
- Sport: Diving
Medal record
Men's diving
Representing Ukraine
European Junior Diving Championships
Silver medal – second place	1994 Pardubice	10 m platform
Silver medal – second place	1995 Geneva	10 m platform

Oleh Yanchenko (born 17 April 1979) is a Ukrainian diver. He competed in the men's 10 metre platform event at the 1996 Summer Olympics.
