= South Korea at the 1997 East Asian Games =

- IOC code: KOR
- NOC: Korean Olympic Committee

in Busan
- Competitors: 296 in 15 sports
- Officials: 80
- Medals Ranked 3rd: Gold 45 Silver 38 Bronze 51 Total 134

East Asian Games appearances
- 1993; 1997; 2001; 2005; 2009; 2013

South Korea competed at the 1997 East Asian Games held in Busan, South Korea from May 10, 1997, to May 19, 1997. South Korea finished third with 45 gold medals, 38 silver medals, and 51 bronze medals.

== Medal summary ==
Sport	Gold	Silver	Bronze	Total
Wrestling	7	6	0	13
Taekwondo	7	0	1	8
Judo	6	3	6	15
Soft tennis	6	3	1	10
Athletics	4	6	8	18
Boxing	4	3	4	11
Badminton	4	2	2	8
Weightlifting	2	5	10	17
Swimming	2	4	13	19
Gymnastics	1	4	2	7
Basketball	1	1	0	2
Football	1	0	0	1
Wushu	0	1	1	2
Diving	0	0	3	3
Totals (14 entries)	45	38	51	134
