= China at the 2001 East Asian Games =

- IOC code: CHN
- NOC: Chinese Olympic Committee external link (in Chinese and English)

in Osaka
- Medals Ranked 1st: Gold 85 Silver 48 Bronze 58 Total 191

East Asian Games appearances
- 1993; 1997; 2001; 2005; 2009; 2013

China competed in the 2001 East Asian Games which were held in Osaka, Japan from May 19, 2001 to May 27, 2001.

== See also ==
- China at the Asian Games
- China at the Olympics
- Sports in China
