= Jenny Keim =

American diver

Personal information
- Full name: Jennifer L. Keim
- Born: June 17, 1978 (age 48) Miami, Florida, U.S.

Sport
- Country: United States
- Sport: Diving

Jennifer L. "Jenny" Keim (born June 17, 1978) is an American diver. She competed at the 2000 Summer Olympics in Sydney, in the women's 3 metre springboard. She was born in Miami, Florida.
