= Natalia Shlemova =

Tajikistani diver

Personal information
- Nationality: Tajikistani
- Born: 21 May 1978 (age 46)

Sport
- Sport: Diving

Natalia Shlemova (born 21 May 1978) is a Tajikistani diver. She competed in the women's 3 metre springboard event at the 1996 Summer Olympics.
