= Brunei Open (badminton) =

Badminton championships

The Brunei Open in badminton was an international tournament held in Brunei from 1992 to 1996 and in 1998.

== Past winners ==
Season	Men's singles	Women's singles	Men's doubles	Women's doubles	Mixed doubles
1992	(Indonesia) Fung Permadi	(Indonesia) Meiluawati	(Indonesia) Reony Mainaky (Indonesia) Aras Razak	(Indonesia) Rosalina Riseu (Indonesia) Lilik Sudarwati	no competition
1993	(Indonesia) Fung Permadi	(Indonesia) Silvia Anggraeni	(Thailand) Pramote Teerawiwatana (Thailand) Sakrapee Thongsari	(Indonesia) Ika Heny Nursanti (Indonesia) Lilik Sudarwati	no competition
1994	(China) Sun Jun	(China) Zhang Ning	(Indonesia) Cun Cun Haryono (Indonesia) Victo Wibowo	(China) Zhang Jin (China) Peng Xingyong	no competition
1995	(Malaysia) Rashid Sidek	(China) Yao Jie	(Indonesia) Cun Cun Haryono (Indonesia) Ade Lukas	(Indonesia) Eny Oktaviani (Indonesia) Nonong Denis Zanati	no competition
1996	(Indonesia) Dwi Aryanto	(China) Wu Huimin	(Indonesia) Cun Cun Haryono (Indonesia) Ade Lukas	(Thailand) Thitikan Duangsiri (Thailand) Pornsawan Plungwech	(Indonesia) Sandiarto (Indonesia) Vera Octavia
1998	(Indonesia) Taufik Hidayat	(China) Gong Ruina	(Indonesia) Tony Gunawan (Indonesia) Halim Haryanto	(China) Yang Wei (China) Huang Nanyan	(Denmark) Jens Eriksen (Denmark) Marlene Thomsen
