= Courtney Johnson (water polo) =

American water polo player (born 1974)

Courtney Anne Young -Johnson
Personal information
- Born: May 7, 1974 (age 52) Salt Lake City, Utah, U.S.
- Education: U. Cal Berkeley (1996); Santa Clara U. Law School (2001)
- Occupations: Law, WP Coach; Sports Administration
- Height: 162 cm (5 ft 4 in)
- Weight: 59 kg (130 lb)
- Spouse: Darren Johnson

Sport
- Sport: Water Polo
- College team: University of California Berkeley
- Club: Modesto-Stanislaus WP Club (circa 1991-1994) (Turlock, CA); Olympic Club, San Francisco (circa 1996)
- Coached by: Brent Bohlender (Modesto-Stan.); Maureen O'Toole Mendoza (Berkeley); Sandra Nitta US Nat. Team; Guy Baker (2000 Olympics)
Medal record
Women's water polo
Representing the United States
Olympic Games
Silver medal – second place	2000 Sydney	Team competition

Courtney Anne Young, (born May 7, 1974) also known by her married name Courtney Anne Johnson was an American competitive swimmer and water polo player, who competed in the 2000 Sydney Olympics where women's water polo made its debut, winning a team silver medal at the Women's water polo event. In the Spring of 2001, she received a law degree from Santa Clara University School of Law. She initially began law studies at the Duquesne University School of Law, while swimming for the Duquesne University Women's swim team in her final year of collegiate eligibility in 1996-7. In addition to practicing law, she coached swimming as an Assistant Coach at Stanford during graduate studies, and served as an executive administrator for the California Magic Soccer Club. She has served as a sports administrator for the U.S. Olympic committee and the NCAA and has more recently coached women's water polo for Pegasus Aquatics in Dallas, Texas.

== Early life ==
Courtney Young was born on May 7, 1974 in Salt Lake City, Utah. She was a 1992 graduate of Skyline High School in Mill Creek, Utah, a part of greater Salt Lake City. She competed with local age-group swimming programs from an early age before taking up water polo. At Skyline, she competed with the water polo team under Coach Steve Marsing by her Sophomore year, averaging 4000 yards swimming per workout. After being accepted with the U.S. Junior National Water Polo team as a High School Junior, she trained for a period with a league in Oregon, though she graduated Skyline.

By 1992, she competed with the Modesto-Stanislaus Water Polo Club, where she was a standout, scoring six goals in a 20-2 victory over the Navato Water Polo Club at the National Water Polo Championships for 18 and under in Portland, Oregon in mid-August 1992. The Modesto-Stanislaus team, a strong program that had won eight of the prior 9 Water Polo National Championships, won the August, 1992 national tournament defeating California's City of Commerce 10-9, with a goal scored by Johnson, earning her first team All-American honors. Johnson competed with the Modesto-Stanislaus team for around three years, where she was coached by USA Water Polo Hall of Fame Coach Brent Bohlender, who also coached the USA Water Polo Junior Women's team from 1985-1999.

== University of California Berkeley ==
A 1996 graduate, Johnson attended the University of California, Berkeley, where she was a member of Berkeley's first Varsity Women's Water Polo team from around 1993-1996. She was coached at Berkeley by soon to be Olympic teammate Maureen O'Toole Mendoza, now Maureen Purcell, who played for the Boy's Water Polo team at Wilson High School in 1976, the boy's Water Polo team at Long Beach City College, and then swam for the University of Hawaii. O'Toole coached originally at Rio Hondo College, and was part of the U.S. Women's National Water Polo Team by 1991. Berkeley Coach Maureen O'Toole competed in water polo at the 2000 Sydney Summer Olympics with Courtney.

Johnson led the Berkeley team to a second-place finish at the Collegiate National Championship Tournament, and was named the Collegiate National Championship Most Valuable Player. She was also honored as the MPSF Northern Division Player of the Year, Western Regional Most Valuable Player and NCAA First Team All-American. During her career, she was named the Daily Californian Female Athlete of the Year. Johnson was the Most Valuable Player for the California Golden Bears for three-successive years from 1994–96. In 2010 she was inducted in the University of California Hall of Fame. Johnson was inducted into the Utah Sports Hall of Fame, class of 2021.

=== International competition ===
In international competition, she competed at the 1998 World Championships in Perth, Australia and the 2001 World Championships in Fukuoka, Japan. She won a silver medal at the 1999 Pan American Games in Winnipeg, Canada.

== 2000 Sydney Olympics Silver Medal ==
Johnson represented the United States at the 2000 Sydney Olympics, winning a silver team medal in the Women's Water Polo competition. At the 2000 Olympics, and during pre-Olympic training, Johnson was coached by Guy Baker, a former three-time consecutive national champion as coach of UCLA Water Polo. Though the women's team from Italy was originally the Olympic favorite, they were not one of the six teams to compete in Sydney, as they placed only fourth at the Olympic Qualifying Tournament. The 2000 Olympic women's water polo qualifying teams were the Australians, Netherlands, Canada, the USA, Russia, and Kazakhstan. Canada and Kazakhstan were eliminated in the initial round robin matches. Australia and the United States defeated Russia (later bronze medalists) and the Netherlands, by scores of 7-6 and 6-5, respectively.

In the final match, the American Women's Water Polo team led 2-1 over Australia at half-time. With only 13 seconds remaining in tournament play, American player Brenda Villa scored to cause a tie at 3-3. In the final 1.3 seconds, Australia’s Yvette Higgins scored scored, and Australia won the gold medal over the U.S. Women's team by a score of 4-3. The women's water polo team from Russia placed third for the bronze medal.

=== Later life ===
After graduating from the University of California, Berkeley in 1996, Johnson attended law school at Duquesne University School of Law in Pittsburgh, PA. She used her final year of college eligibility to compete on the Duquesne University Swim Team during the 1996–1997 season. Johnson then transferred to Santa Clara University School of Law where she graduated in 2001. During law school, Johnson was the volunteer assistant coach at Stanford University. She was on the coaching staff for the inaugural NCAA Women's Water Polo Championship in 1999. She is currently a member of the California State Bar. As a graduate assistant she coached for three years at Stanford.

Courtney Johnson was a member of the United States Olympic Committee Athletes' Advisory Council from 2000–2008. She worked for the United States Olympic Committee AAC Executive Committee from 2004–2008. She was a member of the USOC/NCAA Joint Task Force in 2004 and a member of the USOC Governance Task Force in 2010. Johnson continues to volunteer with the USOC and serves on the United States Olympic Committee Nominating and Governance Committee. She worked in NCAA Compliance at Saint Mary's College of California for four years, and as the Executive Director of Operations for California Magic Soccer Club for two years and the Lamorinda Water Polo Club. She currently lives in Dallas, Texas with her family where she has coached water polo at Pegasus Aquatics.

== See also ==
- List of Olympic medalists in water polo (women)
