= Elvira Cabbarova =

Azerbaijani sprinter

Personal information
- Nationality: Azerbaijani
- Born: 15 November 1976 (age 48)

Sport
- Sport: Sprinting
- Event: 100 metres

Elvira Cabbarova (born 15 November 1976) is an Azerbaijani sprinter. She competed in the women's 100 metres at the 1996 Summer Olympics. Her recorded time was 11.4 seconds in the 100 metres.
