= Tsai Yi-san =

Taiwanese diver

Personal information
- Nationality: Taiwanese
- Born: 11 October 1983 (age 41)

Sport
- Sport: Diving

Tsai Yi-san (Chinese: 蔡依珊; pinyin: Cài Yīshān; born 11 October 1983) is a Taiwanese diver. She competed in the women's 3 metre springboard event at the 2000 Summer Olympics.
