= Vukan Vuletić =

Serbian diver

Personal information
- Born: January 21, 1973 (age 52)

Sport
- Sport: Diving

Vukan Vuletić (Serbian: Вукан Вулетић) (born January 21, 1973) is a Serbian diver. He competed at the 1996 Summer Olympics in Atlanta and took 37th place in men's 10 metre platform.

Vuletić is president of Čukarički Diving Club and min coach. He finished his career in 2000, after 20 years of competing.
