= South Korea at the 2001 East Asian Games =

- IOC code: KOR
- NOC: Korean Olympic Committee

in Osaka
- Competitors: 420 in 18 sports
- Medals Ranked 3rd: Gold 34 Silver 46 Bronze 32 Total 112

East Asian Games appearances
- 1993; 1997; 2001; 2005; 2009; 2013

South Korea competed at the 2001 East Asian Games held in Osaka, Japan from May 19, 2001 to May 27, 2001. South Korea finished third with 34 gold medals, 46 silver medals, and 32 bronze medals.

== Medal summary ==
=== Medal table ===
| Sport | Gold | Silver | Bronze | Total |
|---|---|---|---|---|
| Wrestling | 7 | 5 | 1 | 13 |
| Judo | 5 | 5 | 4 | 14 |
| Weightlifting | 4 | 6 | 3 | 13 |
| Boxing | 4 | 4 | 4 | 12 |
| Taekwondo | 4 | 2 | 1 | 7 |
| Bowling | 3 | 7 | 2 | 12 |
| Swimming | 2 | 3 | 7 | 12 |
| Handball | 2 | 0 | 0 | 2 |
| Soft tennis | 1 | 5 | 3 | 9 |
| Athletics | 1 | 4 | 4 | 9 |
| Gymnastics | 1 | 0 | 2 | 3 |
| Wushu | 0 | 2 | 1 | 3 |
| Basketball | 0 | 1 | 0 | 1 |
| Football | 0 | 1 | 0 | 1 |
| Volleyball | 0 | 1 | 0 | 1 |
| Totals (15 entries) | 34 | 46 | 32 | 112 |
