= Elkhan Mammadov (fencer) =

Azerbaijani fencer

Personal information
- Born: 1 August 1969 (age 56)

Sport
- Sport: Fencing

Elkhan Mammadov (Azerbaijani: Elxan Məmmədov; born 1 August 1969) is an Azerbaijani fencer. He competed in the individual sabre event at the 1996 Summer Olympics.
