= Vivián Alberty =

Puerto Rican diver

Personal information
- Nationality: Puerto Rican
- Born: 22 May 1973 (age 51); San Juan, Puerto Rico

Sport
- Sport: Diving

Vivián Alberty (born 22 May 1973) is a Puerto Rican diver. She competed in the women's 3 metre springboard event at the 1996 Summer Olympics.
