= İlham Kərimov =

Azerbaijani boxer

Personal information
- Nationality: Azerbaijani
- Born: 2 July 1976 (age 48)

Sport
- Sport: Boxing

İlham Kərimov (born 2 July 1976) is an Azerbaijani boxer. He competed in the men's light heavyweight event at the 1996 Summer Olympics.
