= 2001 East Asian Games =

International multi-sport event

III East Asian Games
- Host city: Osaka, Japan
- Nations: 9
- Athletes: 2804
- Events: 15 sports
- Opening: May 19, 2001
- Closing: May 27, 2001
- Opened by: Prince Takamado
- Torch lighter: Naoko Takahashi
- Main venue: Osaka Dome

The 3rd East Asian Games were held in Osaka, Japan from May 19 to 27, 2001. The host China and Japan each ended with 191 medals, although China's tally included 85 golds, compared to Japan's 61.

== Sports ==
The 2001 East Asian Games featured events in 15 sports, which was a new high for the competition.

- Aquatics
  - Swimming
  - Synchronized swimming
  - Diving
- Athletics (45)
- Basketball
- Bowling
- Boxing
- Football
- Gymnastics
  - Artistic gymnastics
  - Rhythmic gymnastics
- Handball
- Judo
- Soft tennis
- Taekwondo
- Volleyball
- Weightlifting
- Wrestling
- Wushu
  - Taolu
  - Sanshou

== Medal table ==
Host nation (Japan)

Rank	Nation	Gold	Silver	Bronze	Total
1	China (CHN)	85	48	58	191
2	Japan (JPN)*	61	65	65	191
3	South Korea (KOR)	34	46	32	112
4	Kazakhstan (KAZ)	13	18	26	57
5	Chinese Taipei (TPE)	6	16	31	53
6	Hong Kong (HKG)	3	1	3	7
7	Mongolia (MGL)	1	2	7	10
8	Macau (MAC)	1	0	3	4
9	Guam (GUM)	0	0	1	1
Totals (9 entries)		204	196	226	626
