= China at the 1997 East Asian Games =

- IOC code: CHN
- NOC: Chinese Olympic Committee external link (in Chinese and English)

in Busan
- Medals Ranked 1st: Gold 62 Silver 59 Bronze 64 Total 185

East Asian Games appearances
- 1993; 1997; 2001; 2005; 2009; 2013

China competed in the 1997 East Asian Games which were held in Busan, South Korea from May 10, 1997, to May 19, 1997.

== See also ==
- China at the Asian Games
- China at the Olympics
- Sports in China
