= Cho Dae-don =

South Korean diver

Personal information
- Nationality: South Korean
- Born: 8 January 1984 (age 42)

Sport
- Sport: Diving

Cho Dae-don (born 8 January 1984) is a South Korean diver. He competed in the men's 10 metre platform event at the 2000 Summer Olympics.
