= Alexey Gurman =

Kazakhstani diver

Personal information
- Nationality: Kazakhstani
- Born: 14 August 1978 (age 47)

Sport
- Sport: Diving

Alexey Gurman (Алексей Михайлович Гурман, born 14 August 1978) is a Kazakhstani diver. He competed in the men's 10 metre platform event at the 2000 Summer Olympics.
