= Arif Akhundov =

Azerbaijani sprinter (born 1972)

Arif Akhundov (born 25 July 1972) is a former Azerbaijani sprinter who competed in the men's 100m competition at the 1996 Summer Olympics. He recorded an 11.11, which was not enough to qualify for the next round past the heats.

He competed in the men's 200 metres at the 1997 World Championships in Athletics, and came third in the 200m at the Kosanov Memorial meet in Kazakhstan in May 2000.

He has been a coach for the Azerbaijani athletics team at the 2015 European Youth Summer Olympic Festival, and a middle/high school PHE teacher for the American International School of Bucharest.
