= Japan at the 1997 East Asian Games =

- IOC code: JPN
- NOC: Japanese Olympic Committee

in Busan
- Medals Ranked 2nd: Gold 47 Silver 53 Bronze 53 Total 153

East Asian Games appearances
- 1993; 1997; 2001; 2005; 2009; 2013

Japan competed at the 1997 East Asian Games held in Busan, South Korea from May 10, 1997, to May 19, 1997. The country finished second behind China with 47 gold medals, 53 silver medals, and 53 bronze medals.
