= Orsolya Pintér =

Hungarian diver

Personal information
- Nationality: Hungarian
- Born: 18 October 1975 (age 49); Budapest, Hungary

Sport
- Sport: Diving

Orsolya Pintér (born 18 October 1975) is a Hungarian diver. She competed at the 1996 Summer Olympics and the 2000 Summer Olympics.
