= Badminton at the East Asian Games =

Badminton Championships

Badminton competitions for the East Asian Games were held in the years 1993, 1997, 2009 and 2013.

== Venues ==
Yeat	Edition	Host city
1993	I	Shanghai, China
1997	II	Busan, South Korea
2009	III	Hong Kong
2013	IV	Tianjin, China

=== Locations ===
Host cities of Badminton at the East Asian Games

== Winners ==
Year	Men's singles	Women's singles	Men's doubles	Women's doubles	Mixed doubles	Men's team	Women's team
1993	(China) Liu Jun	(China) Shen Lianfeng	(China) Jiang Xin (China) Yu Qi	(South Korea) Kim Shin-young (South Korea) Shon Hye-joo	(China) Chen Xingdong (China) Sun Man	China	China
1997	(Chinese Taipei) Fung Permadi	(South Korea) Lee Joo-hyun	(South Korea) Lee Dong-soo (South Korea) Yoo Yong-sung	(China) Zhang Jin (China) Peng Xinyong	(South Korea) Lee Dong-soo (South Korea) Yim Kyung-jin	South Korea	China
2009	(South Korea) Choi Ho-jin	(Hong Kong) Yip Pui Yin	(Chinese Taipei) Hu Chung-hsien (Chinese Taipei) Tsai Chia-hsin	(Macau) Zhang Dan (Macau) Zhang Zhibo	(China) Zhang Yawen (China) Tao Jiaming	China	China
2013	(China) Du Pengyu	(China) Han Li	(Chinese Taipei) Lee Sheng-mu (Chinese Taipei) Tsai Chia-hsin	(China) Ou Dongni (China) Tang Yuanting	(China) Xu Chen (China) Ma Jin	China	China

== Medal table ==
Rank	Nation	Gold	Silver	Bronze	Total
1	China (CHN)	15	12	12	39
2	South Korea (KOR)	6	4	11	21
3	Chinese Taipei (TPE)	3	4	12	19
4	Hong Kong (HKG)	1	3	5	9
5	Macau (MAC)	1	0	0	1
6	Japan (JPN)	0	3	11	14
Totals (6 entries)		26	26	51	103
