= Damir Akhmetbekov =

Kazakhstani diver (born 1975)

Personal information
- Nationality: Kazakhstan
- Born: 4 June 1975 (age 50) Tselinograd, Kazakh SSR, Soviet Union
- Height: 1.70 m (5 ft 7 in)
- Weight: 70 kg (150 lb)

Sport
- Sport: Diving

Damir Akhmetbekov (Дамир Шамильевич Ахметбеков, born 4 June 1975) is a Kazakhstani diver. He competed in the 1996 and 2000 Summer Olympics.
