= Irina Vyguzova =

Kazakhstani diver

Personal information
- Nationality: Kazakhstani
- Born: 26 June 1974 (age 52) Alma-Ata, Kazakh SSR, Soviet Union

Sport
- Sport: Diving
Medal record
Women's diving
Representing Kazakhstan
Summer Universiade
Silver medal – second place	1995 Fukuoka	10m platform
Asian Games
Bronze medal – third place	1998 Bangkok	3m springboard

Irina Vyguzova (Ирина Владимировна Выгузова, born 26 June 1974) is a Kazakhstani diver. She competed at the 1996 Summer Olympics and the 2000 Summer Olympics.
