= Emin Cəbrayilov =

Azerbaijani diver

Emil Jabrayilov
Personal information
- Nationality: Azerbaijani
- Born: 17 January 1978 (age 47)

Sport
- Sport: Diving

Emin Cəbrayilov (born 17 January 1978) is an Azerbaijani diver. He competed at the 1996 Summer Olympics and the 2000 Summer Olympics.
