= Suchart Pichi =

Thai diver (born 1979)

Personal information
- Nationality: Thai
- Born: 28 February 1979 (age 47)

Sport
- Sport: Diving
Medal record
Representing Thailand
Asian Games
Bronze medal – third place	1998 Bangkok	3m springboard
Bronze medal – third place	1998 Bangkok	10m platform

Suchart Pichi (born 28 February 1979) is a Thai diver. He competed at the 1996 Summer Olympics, the 2000 Summer Olympics, and the 2004 Summer Olympics.
