= Ri Ok-rim =

North Korean diver

Personal information
- Nationality: North Korean
- Born: 14 January 1978 (age 48)
- Height: 5 ft 4 in (163 cm)

Sport
- Sport: Diving
- Event: 10 m platform
Medal record
Women's diving
Representing North Korea
Summer Universiade
Bronze medal – third place	2001 Beijing	10 m platform
Bronze medal – third place	2001 Beijing	Team

Ri Ok-rim (born 14 January 1978) is a North Korean diver. She competed at the 1996 Summer Olympics and the 2000 Summer Olympics.
