= 1997 East Asian Games =

International multi-sport event

II East Asian Games
- Host city: Busan, South Korea
- Nations: 9
- Athletes: 1283
- Events: 13 sports
- Opening: May 10, 1997
- Closing: May 19, 1997
- Opened by: President Kim Young-sam
- Main venue: Busan Gudeok Stadium

The 2nd East Asian Games were held in Busan, South Korea from May 10 to May 19, 1997.

Originally, the second edition of the East Asian Games was to be held in Pyongyang, North Korea, in September 1995 but an postponed. However, North Korea dropped the games due to the unstable policial situation in the Korean Peninsula.

The 1997 edition featured nine nations competing in events in 13 sports. North Korea was the only East Asian member nation which did not field a team. The Busan Gudeok Stadium was the main venue for the Games, hosting the opening and closing ceremonies, as well as the athletics and football competitions.

Rowing featured as a demonstration sport for the first time and it was later taken up at the 2005 and 2009 Games.

== Sports ==
- Aquatics
  - Swimming
- Athletics (43)
- Badminton
- Basketball
- Bowling †
- Boxing
- Football
- Gymnastics
  - Artistic gymnastics
  - Rhythmic gymnastics
- Judo
- Rowing ††
- Soft tennis
- Taekwondo
- Weightlifting
- Wrestling
- Wushu

† – Exhibition sport
†† – Demonstration sport

== Medal table ==
* Host nation (South Korea)

Rank	Nation	Gold	Silver	Bronze	Total
1	China (CHN)	62	59	64	185
2	Japan (JPN)	47	53	53	153
3	South Korea (KOR)*	45	38	51	134
4	Kazakhstan (KAZ)	24	12	22	58
5	Chinese Taipei (TPE)	8	22	19	49
6	Mongolia (MGL)	3	2	19	24
7	Hong Kong (HKG)	1	2	2	5
8	Guam (GUM)	0	0	1	1
8	Macau (MAC)	0	0	1	1
Totals (9 entries)		190	188	232	610
